= 2016 WRC2 Championship =

Rallying championship season

The 2016 FIA WRC2 Championship was the fourth season of WRC2, a rallying championship organised and governed by the Fédération Internationale de l'Automobile, ran in support of the World Rally Championship. The Championship was open to cars complying with R4, R5, and Super 2000 regulations. The Championship was composed of thirteen rallies, and drivers and teams had to nominate a maximum of seven events. The best six results counted towards the championship.

After winning in 2015 and 2014, Nasser Al-Attiyah did not participate in the 2016 season. The Qatari driver decided to focus on the 2016 Dakar Rally and on training for the 2016 Summer Olympics, in attempt to win a medal in the Men's Skeet event.

== Calendar ==
The calendar was announced in November 2015 by the FIA. The season was scheduled to expand with one rally in comparison to the 2015 championship, contested over fourteen rounds in Europe, the Americas, Oceania and Asia, but the Chinese round was ultimately cancelled.

Round	Dates	Rally name	Rally headquarters	Surface	Stages	Distance
1	21–24 January	(Monaco) Monte Carlo Rally	Gap, Hautes-Alpes, France	Mixed	16	337.59km
2	12–14 February	Rally Sweden	Karlstad, Värmland	Snow	12^{1a}	226.48km^{1b}
3	3–6 March	Rally Mexico	León, Guanajuato	Gravel	21	399.67km
4	21–24 April	Rally Argentina	Villa Carlos Paz, Córdoba	Gravel	18	364.68km
5	19–22 May	Rally de Portugal	Matosinhos, Porto	Gravel	19	368.00km
6	9–12 June	(Italy) Rally Italia Sardegna	Alghero, Sardinia	Gravel	19	324.60km
7	30 June–3 July	Rally Poland	Mikołajki, Warmia-Masuria	Gravel	21	306.10km
8	28–31 July	Rally Finland	Jyväskylä, Keski-Suomi	Gravel	24	333.99km
9	19–21 August	(Germany) Rallye Deutschland	Trier, Rhineland-Palatinate	Tarmac	18	306.80km
10	9–11 September	Rally China	Beijing, Hebei	Tarmac	Cancelled^{2}	
11	30 September–2 October	(France) Tour de Corse	Bastia, Haute-Corse	Tarmac	10	390.92km
12	13–16 October	(Spain) Rally Catalunya	Salou, Tarragona	Mixed	21	321.08km
13	28–30 October	(United Kingdom) Wales Rally GB	Deeside, Flintshire	Gravel	22	336.00km
14	18–20 November	Rally Australia	Coffs Harbour, New South Wales	Gravel	23	283.36km^{3}

Notes

- ^1 – Rally Sweden was shortened due to warm weather conditions turning frozen roads into soft, muddy gravel and making the studded tyres unsafe to use.
- ^2 – Rally China was cancelled due to weather damage caused by torrential storms and flooding in July.
- ^3 – The route of Rally Australia was shortened following concerns over dust reducing visibility in forest stages.

=== Calendar changes ===
- Rally Australia was moved from its September date to November to become the final round of the championship.
- The calendar was to be expanded to fourteen rounds in 2016, with the inclusion of the Rally of China, seventeen years after its only appearance as a round of the WRC.
- The Tour de Corse relocated its headquarters from Corte to Bastia, which features a brand-new route.

== Regulation changes ==
- The Production Cup for Drivers and Co-driver will be discontinued after 2015.

== Teams and drivers ==
Entrant	Car	Class	Tyre	Drivers	Co-drivers	Rounds
(Austria) BRR Baumschlager Rally & Rally Team	Škoda Fabia R5	R5	P	(Germany) Armin Kremer	(Germany) Pirmin Winklhofer	1, 3, 6–7, 9, 11
(France) 2C Competition	Škoda Fabia R5	R5	P	(France) Julien Maurin	(France) Benjamin Veillas	1
(France) 2C Competition	Škoda Fabia R5	R5	P	(France) Julien Maurin	(France) Olivier Ural	5–7, 9–11
(France) Sébastien Loeb Racing	Peugeot 208 T16 R5	R5	MI	(France) Quentin Giordano	(France) Thierry Salva	6–8
(France) Sébastien Loeb Racing	Peugeot 208 T16 R5	R5	MI	(France) Quentin Giordano	(France) Thomas Roux	9–10
(France) PH Sport	Citroën DS3 R5	R5	MI	(France) Quentin Giordano	(France) Valentin Sarreaud	1
(France) PH Sport	Citroën DS3 R5	R5	MI	(France) Jean-Michel Raoux	(France) Laurent Magat	1
(France) PH Sport	Citroën DS3 R5	R5	MI	(France) Pierre-Louis Loubet	(France) Vincent Landais	6–10
(Italy) Munaretto Sport	Peugeot 207 S2000	S	MI	(France) Pierre-Louis Loubet	(France) Vincent Landais	1, 5
(United Kingdom) M-Sport World Rally Team	Ford Fiesta R5	R5	MI	(United Kingdom) Elfyn Evans	(United Kingdom) Craig Parry	1–2, 4–5, 7–8, 10
(United Kingdom) M-Sport World Rally Team	Ford Fiesta R5	R5	MI	(Norway) Eyvind Brynildsen	(Sweden) Anders Fredriksson	2
(United Kingdom) M-Sport World Rally Team	Ford Fiesta R5	R5	MI	(Norway) Henning Solberg	(Austria) Ilka Minor	8
(United Kingdom) M-Sport World Rally Team	Ford Fiesta R5	R5	MI	(United Kingdom) Rhys Yates	(United Kingdom) Tom Woodburn	12
(United Kingdom) M-Sport World Rally Team	Ford Fiesta R5	R5	MI	(United Kingdom) Gus Greensmith	(Germany) Katrin Becker	12
(Romania) Napoca Rally Academy	Ford Fiesta R5	R5	P	(Italy) Simone Tempestini	(Italy) Matteo Chiarcossi	1–2
(Netherlands) Heuvel Motorsport	Mitsubishi Lancer Evo X	R4	MI	(France) Alain Foulon	(France) Bernard Ferro	1
(Netherlands) Heuvel Motorsport	Mitsubishi Lancer Evo X	R4	MI	(France) Alain Foulon	(France) Gilles Delarche	2, 7, 11–12
(Netherlands) Heuvel Motorsport	Mitsubishi Lancer Evo X	R4	MI	(Netherlands) Jim Van den Heuvel	(Netherlands) Lisette Bakker	2
(Netherlands) Heuvel Motorsport	Mitsubishi Lancer Evo X	R4	MI	(Netherlands) Jim Van den Heuvel	(Netherlands) Jac Gillis	5, 7
(Netherlands) Heuvel Motorsport	Mitsubishi Lancer Evo X	R4	MI	(Netherlands) Jim Van den Heuvel	(Germany) Josefine Beinke	9
(Netherlands) Heuvel Motorsport	Mitsubishi Lancer Evo X	R4	MI	(Netherlands) Jim Van den Heuvel	(Netherlands) Jouri Dockx	11–12
(Belgium) J-Motorsport	Citroën DS3 R5	R5	MI	(Greece) Jourdan Serderidis	(Belgium) Frédéric Miclotte	1, 9, 13
(Belgium) J-Motorsport	Citroën DS3 R5	R5	MI	(Sweden) Emil Bergkvist	(Sweden) Joakim Sjöberg	2, 5, 7–8
(Belgium) DG Sport Compétition	Citroën DS3 R5	R5	MI	(France) Quentin Gilbert	(Belgium) Renaud Jamoul	1, 5–9, 10
(France) CHL Sport Auto	Citroën DS3 R5	R5	P	(France) Yoann Bonato	(France) Denis Giraudet	1, 5–9
(France) CHL Sport Auto	Citroën DS3 R5	R5	P	(France) Yoann Bonato	(France) Benjamin Boulloud	10
(France) Peugeot Rally Academy	Peugeot 208 T16 R5	R5	MI	(Spain) José Antonio Suárez	(Spain) Cándido Carrera	1, 5–6, 9–11
(Mexico) Triviño World Rally Team	Citroën DS3 R5	R5	P	(Mexico) Ricardo Triviño	(Spain) Sergio Salom	1
(Mexico) Triviño World Rally Team	Citroën DS3 R5	R5	P	(Mexico) Ricardo Triviño	(Mexico) Marco Hernández	3
(Mexico) Triviño World Rally Team	Citroën DS3 R5	R5	P	(Mexico) Ricardo Triviño	(Spain) Mario Tomé	11
(Poland) The Ptock	Škoda Fabia R5	R5	P	(Poland) Hubert Ptaszek	(Poland) Kamil Kozdroń	1
(Poland) The Ptock	Škoda Fabia R5	R5	P	(Poland) Hubert Ptaszek	(Poland) Maciek Szczepaniak	2, 5, 7–8
(Poland) The Ptock	Ford Fiesta R5	R5	P	(Poland) Hubert Ptaszek	(Poland) Maciek Szczepaniak	10, 12
Peugeot Sport Slovakia	Peugeot 208 T16 R5	R5	P	(Poland) Hubert Ptaszek	(Poland) Maciek Szczepaniak	3–4, 6, 9, 11, 13
(Greece) Laskaris Foundation	Škoda Fabia R5	R5	P	(Greece) Lambros Athanassoulas	(Greece) Nikolaos Zakheos	1
(Czech Republic) Škoda Motorsport	Škoda Fabia R5	R5	MI	(Finland) Esapekka Lappi	(Finland) Janne Ferm	2, 6–9, 12–13
(Czech Republic) Škoda Motorsport	Škoda Fabia R5	R5	MI	(Sweden) Pontus Tidemand	(Sweden) Jonas Andersson	2, 5, 7–8, 11
(Czech Republic) Škoda Motorsport	Škoda Fabia R5	R5	MI	(Czech Republic) Jan Kopecký	(Czech Republic) Pavel Dresler	5–6, 9–12
(Poland) C-Rally	Ford Fiesta R5	R5	P	(Poland) Jarosław Kołtun	(Poland) Ireneusz Pleskot	2, 7, 12
(Poland) C-Rally	Ford Fiesta R5	R5	P	(Poland) Michał Sołowow	(Poland) Maciek Baran	2
(Italy) Motorsport Italia srl	Ford Fiesta R5	R5	P	(Italy) Max Rendina	(Italy) Emanuele Inglesi	2–3, 6
(Italy) Motorsport Italia srl	Škoda Fabia R5	R5	P	(Italy) Max Rendina	(Italy) Emanuele Inglesi	9
(United Kingdom) CA1 Sport Ltd	Ford Fiesta R5	R5	MI	(Sweden) Fredrik Åhlin	(Norway) Morten Erik Abrahamsen	2
(United Kingdom) CA1 Sport Ltd	Ford Fiesta R5	R5	MI	(Sweden) Fredrik Åhlin	(United Kingdom) Andrew Roughead	12
(United Kingdom) Drive DMACK Trophy Team	Ford Fiesta R5	R5	DM	(Estonia) Sander Pärn	(United Kingdom) James Morgan	2, 11
(United Kingdom) Drive DMACK Trophy Team	Ford Fiesta R5	R5	DM	(Estonia) Sander Pärn	(Estonia) Martin Järveoja	5
(United Kingdom) Drive DMACK Trophy Team	Ford Fiesta R5	R5	DM	(Estonia) Karl Kruuda	(Estonia) Martin Järveoja	6–8
(United Kingdom) Drive DMACK Trophy Team	Ford Fiesta R5	R5	DM	(Norway) Marius Aasen	(Norway) Veronica Engan	2, 5–8, 11–12
(United Kingdom) Drive DMACK Trophy Team	Ford Fiesta R5	R5	DM	(United Kingdom) Osian Pryce	(United Kingdom) Dale Furniss	12
(Russia) TAIF Motorsport	Ford Fiesta R5	R5	MI	(Russia) Radik Shaymiev	(Russia) Maxim Tsvetkov	2–5, 8
(Russia) TAIF Motorsport	Ford Fiesta R5	R5	DM	(Estonia) Sander Pärn	(United Kingdom) James Morgan	7
(Estonia) MM Motorsport	Ford Fiesta R5	R5	MI	(Ukraine) Oleksiy Kikireshko	(Estonia) Kuldar Sikk	2
(Finland) Printsport	Škoda Fabia R5	R5	MI	(Norway) Ole Christian Veiby	(Norway) Stig Rune Skjærmoen	2, 11–12
(Italy) Bernini Rally	Ford Fiesta R5	R5	HK	(Paraguay) Augusto Bestard	(Paraguay) Fernando Mendonca	2, 4–6
(Norway) Anders Grøndal Rally Team	Ford Fiesta R5	R5	P	(Norway) Anders Grøndal	(Sweden) Miriam Walfridsson	2
(France) Team Oreca	Škoda Fabia R5	R5	MI	(Finland) Teemu Suninen	(Finland) Mikko Markkula	5–8, 11–12
(Finland) TGS Worldwide OU	Škoda Fabia R5	R5	MI	(Finland) Teemu Suninen	(Finland) Mikko Markkula	3
(Finland) TGS Worldwide OU	Škoda Fabia R5	R5	MI	(Paraguay) Didier Arias	(Paraguay) Hector Nunes	4
(Finland) TGS Worldwide OU	Škoda Fabia S2000	S	MI	(Finland) Joonas Soilu	(Finland) Tuomo Hannonen	8
Culture & Sport Qatar Rally Team	Škoda Fabia R5	R5	MI	(Qatar) Abdulaziz Al-Kuwari	(Republic of Ireland) Killian Duffy	3–5, 9, 11–12
Culture & Sport Qatar Rally Team	Škoda Fabia R5	R5	MI	(Qatar) Khalid Al-Suwaidi	(United Kingdom) Marshall Clarke	13
Culture & Sport Qatar Rally Team	Ford Fiesta R5	R5	MI	(Qatar) Khalid Al-Suwaidi	(United Kingdom) Marshall Clarke	7, 9, 12
Culture & Sport Qatar Rally Team	Ford Fiesta R5	R5	MI	(Qatar) Khalid Al-Suwaidi	(Italy) Giovanni Bernacchini	3–5
(Netherlands) Wevers Sport	Škoda Fabia R5	R5	P	(Peru) Nicolás Fuchs	(Argentina) Fernando Mussano	3–7, 11–13
(Netherlands) Wevers Sport	Škoda Fabia R5	R5	P	(Netherlands) Bernhard ten Brinke	(Belgium) Davy Thierie	9, 11
(Netherlands) Wevers Sport	Škoda Fabia R5	R5	P	(Denmark) Kristian Poulsen	(Denmark) Ole Frederiksen	9
(Netherlands) Wevers Sport	Škoda Fabia R5	R5	P	(Netherlands) Mark van Eldik	(Netherlands) Harmen Scholtalbers	9
(Netherlands) Wevers Sport	Škoda Fabia R5	R5	P	(Netherlands) Edwin Schilt	(Netherlands) Lisette Bakker	9
(Netherlands) Wevers Sport	Škoda Fabia R5	R5	P	(United Kingdom) David Bogie	(United Kingdom) Kevin Rae	12
(Portugal) AR Vidal Racing	Škoda Fabia R5	R5	MI	(Portugal) Miguel Campos	(Portugal) Carlos Magalhães	5
(Portugal) Sports & You	Ford Fiesta R5	R5	HK	(Portugal) Diogo Salvi	(Portugal) Paulo Babo	5
(United Kingdom) Autotek Motorsport	Škoda Fabia R5	R5	DM	(Australia) Scott Pedder	(Australia) Dale Moscatt	5, 7–8
(Belgium) Icepol Racing Team	Škoda Fabia R5	R5	MI	(Belgium) Ghislain de Mevius	(Belgium) Johan Jalet	5, 9–11
(Italy) D-Max Racing	Ford Fiesta R5	R5	P	(Belgium) Cédric Cherain	(Belgium) André Leyh	5
(Spain) RMC Motorsport	Ford Fiesta R5	R5	HK	(Brazil) Ilo Dhiel	(Brazil) Eduardo da Silva	5, 7
(Spain) RMC Motorsport	Ford Fiesta R5	R5	HK	(Spain) Gustavo Sosa	(Spain) Rogelio Peñate	5, 7
(Hungary) Turán Motorsport SE	Ford Fiesta R5	R5	HK	(Hungary) Frigyes Turán	(Hungary) Gábor Zsíros	5–7, 9, 11–12
(Italy) S.A. Motorsport Italia srl	Škoda Fabia R5	R5	P	(Italy) Umberto Scandola	(Italy) Guido D'Amore	6
(Poland) Lotos Rally Team	Ford Fiesta R5	R5	P	(Poland) Kajetan Kajetanowicz	(Poland) Jarosław Baran	7
(Finland) Tommi Mäkinen Racing	Ford Fiesta R5	R5	MI	(Japan) Hiroki Arai	(Australia) Glenn MacNeall	8
(Finland) Tommi Mäkinen Racing	Ford Fiesta R5	R5	MI	(Japan) Takamoto Katsuta	(United Kingdom) Daniel Barritt	8
(Germany) Toksport World Rally Team	Ford Fiesta R5	R5	MI	(Finland) Janne Tuohino	(Finland) Markku Tuohino	8
(Germany) Škoda Auto Deutschland	Škoda Fabia R5	R5	MI	(Germany) Fabian Kreim	(Germany) Frank Christian	9
(Germany) Hyundai Motorsport N	Hyundai i20 R5	R5	MI	(Netherlands) Kevin Abbring	(United Kingdom) Sebastian Marshall	10, 12
(Czech Republic) Škoda Motorsport II	Škoda Fabia R5	R5	MI	(Sweden) Pontus Tidemand	(Sweden) Jonas Andersson	12

Icon	Class
R4	Classification within Group R
R5	Classification within Group R
S	Super 2000

== Results and standings ==
=== Season summary ===
Round	Event name	Winning driver	Winning co-driver	Winning Entry	Winning Car	Winning time	Report
1	(Monaco) Rallye Monte Carlo	(United Kingdom) Elfyn Evans	(United Kingdom) Craig Parry	(United Kingdom) M-Sport World Rally Team	Ford Fiesta R5	4:08:23.9	Report
2	Rally Sweden	(United Kingdom) Elfyn Evans	(United Kingdom) Craig Parry	(United Kingdom) M-Sport World Rally Team	Ford Fiesta R5	2:05:04.4	Report
3	Rally Mexico	(Finland) Teemu Suninen	(Finland) Mikko Markkula	(Finland) TGS Worldwide OU	Škoda Fabia R5	4:43:59.2	Report
4	Rally Argentina	(Peru) Nicolás Fuchs	(Argentina) Fernando Mussano	(Netherlands) Wevers Sport	Škoda Fabia R5	4:05:35.7	Report
5	Rally de Portugal	(Sweden) Pontus Tidemand	(Sweden) Jonas Andersson	(Czech Republic) Škoda Motorsport	Škoda Fabia R5	4:10:46.2	Report
6	(Italy) Rally Italia Sardegna	(Finland) Teemu Suninen	(Finland) Mikko Markkula	(France) Team Oreca	Škoda Fabia R5	3:44:23.2	Report
7	Rally Poland	(Finland) Teemu Suninen	(Finland) Mikko Markkula	(France) Team Oreca	Škoda Fabia R5	2:43:27.7	Report
8	Rally Finland	(Finland) Esapekka Lappi	(Finland) Janne Ferm	(Czech Republic) Škoda Motorsport	Škoda Fabia R5	2:42:59.6	Report
9	(Germany) Rallye Deutschland	(Finland) Esapekka Lappi	(Finland) Janne Ferm	(Czech Republic) Škoda Motorsport	Škoda Fabia R5	3:09:03.5	Report
10	Rally China	Rally cancelled					
11	(France) Tour de Corse	(United Kingdom) Elfyn Evans	(United Kingdom) Craig Parry	(United Kingdom) M-Sport World Rally Team	Ford Fiesta R5	4:14:22.0	Report
12	(Spain) Rally Catalunya	(Czech Republic) Jan Kopecký	(Czech Republic) Pavel Dresler	(Czech Republic) Škoda Motorsport	Škoda Fabia R5	3:22:08.7	Report
13	(United Kingdom) Wales Rally GB	(Finland) Esapekka Lappi	(Finland) Janne Ferm	(Czech Republic) Škoda Motorsport	Škoda Fabia R5	3:24:00.3	Report
14	Rally Australia	(Finland) Esapekka Lappi	(Finland) Janne Ferm	(Czech Republic) Škoda Motorsport	Škoda Fabia R5	2:53:38.0	Report

=== FIA WRC2 Championship for Drivers ===
Points are awarded to the top ten classified finishers.

Position	1st	2nd	3rd	4th	5th	6th	7th	8th	9th	10th
Points	25	18	15	12	10	8	6	4	2	1

Pos.	Driver	MON (Monaco)	SWE (Sweden)	MEX (Mexico)	ARG (Argentina)	POR (Portugal)	ITA (Italy)	POL (Poland)	FIN (Finland)	GER (Germany)	FRA (France)	ESP (Spain)	GBR (United Kingdom)	AUS (Australia)	Drops	Points
1	(Finland) Esapekka Lappi		3				9	3	1	1			1	1	2	130
2	(United Kingdom) Elfyn Evans	1	1		4	14		2	3		1				0	120
3	(Finland) Teemu Suninen			1		16	1	1	2			4	3		0	120
4	(Czech Republic) Jan Kopecký					10	2			2	2	1	4	WD	0	92
5	(Sweden) Pontus Tidemand		2			1		7	Ret			2	2		0	85
6	(Peru) Nicolás Fuchs			4	1	2	Ret	8					7	2	0	83
7	(Germany) Armin Kremer	2		5			4	Ret		3		Ret			0	55
8	(Poland) Hubert Ptaszek^{3}			2	2		WD			9		Ret		3	0	53
9	(Norway) Marius Aasen		8			3	7	Ret	6			6	5		0	51
10	(France) Pierre-Louis Loubet	WD				Ret	6	6	Ret	5	5				0	36
11	(France) Quentin Gilbert	3				Ret	10	Ret	5	Ret	6				0	34
12	(France) Yoann Bonato	5				7	WD	Ret	9	12	3				0	33
13	(Norway) Ole Christian Veiby		6									5	6		0	26
14	(France) Julien Maurin	Ret				13	5	15		Ret	4	11			0	22
15	(Qatar) Abdulaziz Al-Kuwari			Ret	3	8				10					0	20
16	(Belgium) Ghislain de Mevius					6				4	WD	12			0	20
17	(Hungary) Frigyes Turán					9	8	9		8		8	8		0	20
18	(Poland) Hubert Ptaszek^{4}	7	Ret			Ret		Ret	7		7		Ret		0	18
19	(Estonia) Karl Kruuda						3	10	Ret						0	16
20	(Australia) Scott Pedder					4		Ret	8						0	16
21	(Spain) José Antonio Suárez	6				12	Ret			7	Ret	9			0	16
22	(Netherlands) Jim Van Den Heuvel		Ret			18		13				3	13		0	15
23	(Italy) Max Redina		Ret	3			WD			Ret					0	15
24	(Qatar) Khalid Al-Suwaidi			Ret	Ret	11		11		Ret			10	4	0	13
25	(France) Quentin Giordano	4					Ret	Ret		Ret	WD				0	12
26	(Norway) Anders Grøndal		4												0	12
27	(Poland) Kajetan Kajetanowicz							4							0	12
28	(Norway) Henning Solberg								4						0	12
29	(Paraguay) Augusto Bestard		11	WD	5	15	11	12							0	10
30	(Greece) Jourdan Serderidis	Ret								12				5	0	10
31	(Poland) Jarosław Kołtun		WD					5					Ret		0	10
32	(Norway) Eyvind Brynildsen		5												0	10
33	(Portugal) Miguel Campos					5									0	10
34	(Netherlands) Bernhard ten Brinke									6		Ret			0	8
35	(Sweden) Emil Bergkvist		7			Ret		Ret	13	WD					0	6
36	(Estonia) Sander Pärn		Ret			Ret		Ret				7			0	6
37	(Greece) Lambros Athanassoulas	8													0	4
38	(Italy) Simone Tempestini	9	9												0	4
39	(United Kingdom) David Bogie												9		0	2
40	(Russia) Radik Shaymiev		10	Ret					10						0	2
41	(France) Alain Foulon	10	12					14				13	Ret		0	1
42	(Mexico) Ricardo Triviño	12		WD								10			0	1
Pos.	Driver	MON (Monaco)	SWE (Sweden)	MEX (Mexico)	ARG (Argentina)	POR (Portugal)	ITA (Italy)	POL (Poland)	FIN (Finland)	GER (Germany)	FRA (France)	ESP (Spain)	GBR (United Kingdom)	AUS (Australia)	Drops	Points

Key
Colour	Result
Gold	Winner
Silver	2nd place
Bronze	3rd place
Green	Points finish
Blue	Non-points finish
Blue	Non-classified finish (NC)
Purple	Did not finish (Ret)
Black	Excluded (EX)
Black	Disqualified (DSQ)
White	Did not start (DNS)
White	Cancelled (C)
Blank	Withdrew entry from the event (WD)

Notes

- ^3 – Points earned as Peugeot Sport Slovakia entry.
- ^4 – Points earned as The Ptock entry.

=== FIA WRC2 Championship for Co-Drivers ===
Pos.	Co-driver	MON (Monaco)	SWE (Sweden)	MEX (Mexico)	ARG (Argentina)	POR (Portugal)	ITA (Italy)	POL (Poland)	FIN (Finland)	GER (Germany)	FRA (France)	ESP (Spain)	GBR (United Kingdom)	AUS (Australia)	Drops	Points
1	(Finland) Janne Ferm		3				9	3	1	1			1	1	2	130
2	(Finland) Mikko Markkula			1		16	1	1	2			4	3		0	120
3	(United Kingdom) Craig Parry	1	1		4	14		2	3		1				0	120
4	(Czech Republic) Pavel Dresler					10	2			2	2	1	4	WD	0	92
5	(Sweden) Jonas Andersson		2			1		7	Ret			2	2		0	85
6	(Argentina) Fernando Mussano			4	1	2	Ret	8					7	2	0	83
7	(Germany) Pirmin Winklhofer	2		5			4			3		Ret			0	55
8	(Poland) Maciek Szczepaniak^{3}			2	2		WD			9		Ret		3	0	53
9	(Norway) Veronica Engan		8			3	7	Ret	6			6	5		0	51
10	(France) Vincent Landais	WD				Ret	6	6	Ret	5	5				0	36
11	(Belgium) Renaud Jamoul	3				Ret	10	Ret	5	Ret	6				0	34
12	(Norway) Stig Rune Skjærmoen		6									5	6		0	26
13	(France) Olivier Ural					13	5	15		Ret	4	11			0	22
14	(Republic of Ireland) Killian Duffy			Ret	3	8				10					0	20
15	(Belgium) Johan Jalet					6				4	WD	12			0	20
16	(Hungary) Gábor Zsíros					9	8	9		8		8	8		0	20
17	(France) Denis Giraudet	5				7	WD	Ret	9	12					0	18
18	(Estonia) Martin Järveoja					Ret	3	10	Ret						0	16
19	(Australia) Dale Moscatt					4		Ret	8						0	16
20	(Spain) Cándido Carrera	6				12	Ret			7	Ret	9			0	16
21	(Italy) Emanuele Inglesi		Ret	3			WD			Ret					0	15
22	(Netherlands) Jouri Dockx											3	12		0	15
23	(France) Benjamin Boulloud										3				0	15
24	(United Kingdom) Marshall Clarke					11		11		Ret			10	4	0	13
25	(France) Valentin Sarreaud	4													0	12
26	(Sweden) Miriam Walfridsson		4												0	12
27	(Poland) Jarosław Baran							4							0	12
28	(Austria) Ilka Minor								4						0	12
29	(Poland) Maciek Szczepaniak^{4}		Ret			Ret		Ret	7		7		Ret		0	12
30	(Paraguay) Fernando Mendonca		11	WD	5	15	11	12							0	10
31	(Belgium) Frédéric Miclotte	Ret								12				5	0	10
32	(Poland) Ireneusz Pleskot		WD					5					Ret		0	10
33	(Sweden) Anders Fredriksson		5												0	10
34	(Portugal) Carlos Magalhães					5									0	10
35	(Belgium) Davy Thierie									6		Ret			0	8
36	(Sweden) Joakim Sjöberg		7			Ret		Ret	13	WD					0	6
37	(United Kingdom) James Morgan		Ret					Ret				7			0	6
38	(Poland) Kamil Kozdroń	7													0	6
39	(Greece) Nikolaos Zakheos	8													0	4
40	(Italy) Matteo Chiarcossi	9	9												0	4
41	(United Kingdom) Kevin Rae												9		0	2
40	(Russia) Maxim Tsvetkov		10	Ret					10						0	2
42	(France) Bernard Ferro	10													0	1
43	(Spain) Mario González Tomé											10			0	1
Pos.	Co-driver	MON (Monaco)	SWE (Sweden)	MEX (Mexico)	ARG (Argentina)	POR (Portugal)	ITA (Italy)	POL (Poland)	FIN (Finland)	GER (Germany)	FRA (France)	ESP (Spain)	GBR (United Kingdom)	AUS (Australia)	Drops	Points

Key
Colour	Result
Gold	Winner
Silver	2nd place
Bronze	3rd place
Green	Points finish
Blue	Non-points finish
Blue	Non-classified finish (NC)
Purple	Did not finish (Ret)
Black	Excluded (EX)
Black	Disqualified (DSQ)
White	Did not start (DNS)
White	Cancelled (C)
Blank	Withdrew entry from the event (WD)

=== FIA WRC2 Championship for Teams ===
Pos.	Team	MON (Monaco)	SWE (Sweden)	MEX (Mexico)	ARG (Argentina)	POR (Portugal)	ITA (Italy)	POL (Poland)	FIN (Finland)	GER (Germany)	FRA (France)	ESP (Spain)	GBR (United Kingdom)	AUS (Australia)	Points
1	(Czech Republic) Škoda Motorsport		2			1	2	3	1	1	2	1	1	1	219
2	(United Kingdom) M-Sport World Rally Team	1	1		3	7		2	3		1		9		131
3	(France) Team Oreca					8	1	1	2			2	3		105
4	(United Kingdom) Drive DMACK Trophy Team		4			2	3	7	4			4	4		87
5	Peugeot Sport Slovakia			2	1		WD			6		Ret		2	69
6	(Austria) BRR Baumschlager Rally & Rally Team	2		4			4	Ret		2		Ret			60
7	Culture & Sport Qatar Rally Team		Ret	2	4	8				7			8	3	59
8	(Hungary) Turán Motorsport SE					5	5	6		5		5	6		56
9	(France) Peugeot Rally Academy	3				6	Ret			4	Ret	6			43
10	(Finland) Printsport		3									3	5		40
11	(Poland) The Ptock	4	Ret			Ret		Ret	5		3		Ret		37
12	(Finland) TGS Worldwide			1	Ret				9						27
13	(Netherlands) Wevers Sport									3		Ret	7		21
14	(Belgium) Icepol Racing Team					3						8			19
15	(Czech Republic) Škoda Motorsport II												2		18
16	(Romania) Napoca Rally Academy	6	5												18
17	(Russia) TAIF Motorsport		6	Ret				Ret	6						16
18	(Italy) Motorsport Italia s.r.l.		Ret	3			WD			Ret					15
19	(Poland) Lotos Rally Team							4							12
20	(Mexico) Triviño World Rally Team	7		WD								7			12
21	(Poland) C-Rally		WD					5					Ret		10
22	(Greece) Laskaris Foundation	5													10
23	(Germany) Toksport World Rally Team								7						6
24	(Finland) Tommi Mäkinen Racing								8						4
25	(Germany) Škoda Auto Deutschland									8					4
26	(Spain) RMC Motorsport					9		Ret							2
Pos.	Team	MON (Monaco)	SWE (Sweden)	MEX (Mexico)	ARG (Argentina)	POR (Portugal)	ITA (Italy)	POL (Poland)	FIN (Finland)	GER (Germany)	FRA (France)	ESP (Spain)	GBR (United Kingdom)	AUS (Australia)	Points

Key
Colour	Result
Gold	Winner
Silver	2nd place
Bronze	3rd place
Green	Points finish
Blue	Non-points finish
Blue	Non-classified finish (NC)
Purple	Did not finish (Ret)
Black	Excluded (EX)
Black	Disqualified (DSQ)
White	Did not start (DNS)
White	Cancelled (C)
Blank	Withdrew entry from the event (WD)
