= Sander Pärn =

Estonian rally driver

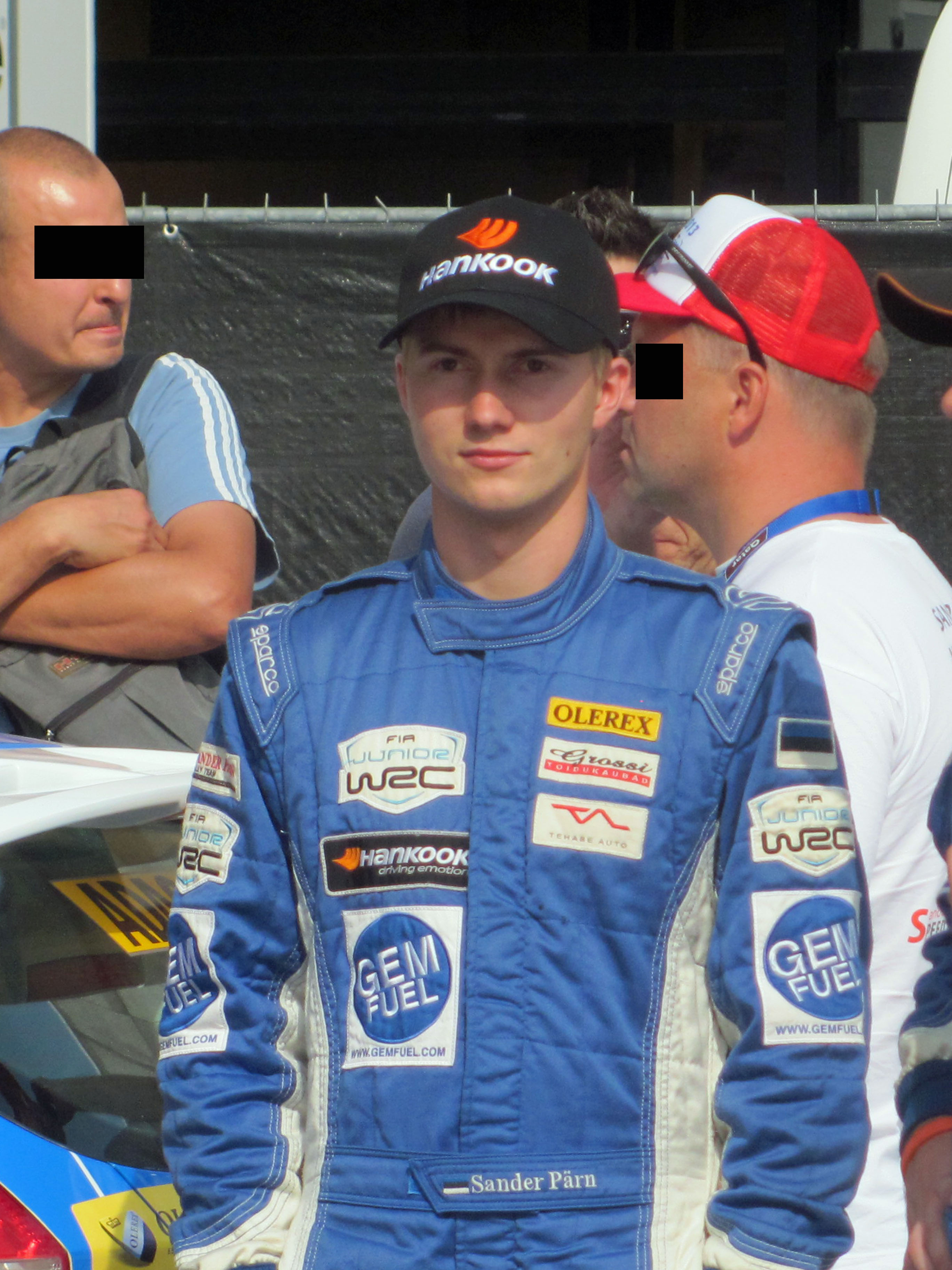
- Sander Pärn, 2013

Personal information
- Nationality: (Estonia) Estonian
- Born: 19 February 1992 (age 34)

World Rally Championship record
- Years active: 2009–2016
- Co-driver: (United Kingdom) James Morgan
- Teams: Estonian Autosport Union, Autotek-Drive Dmack
- Rallies: 24
- Championships: 0
- Rally wins: 0
- Podiums: 0
- Stage wins: 0
- Total points: 0
- First rally: 2009 Rally GB
- Last rally: 2016 Wales Rally GB
- Last updated on: 24 January 2017.

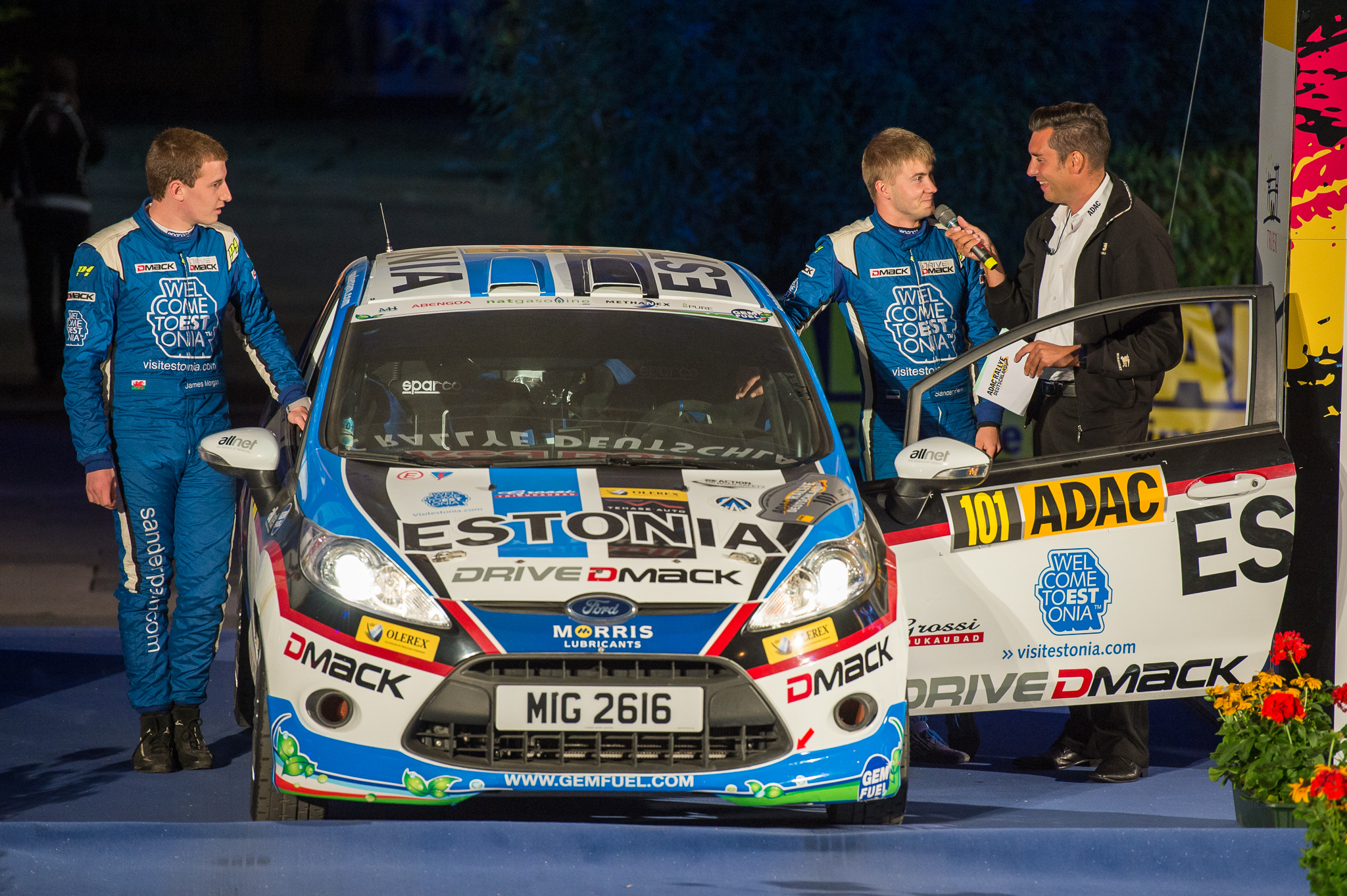
Pärn, 2014

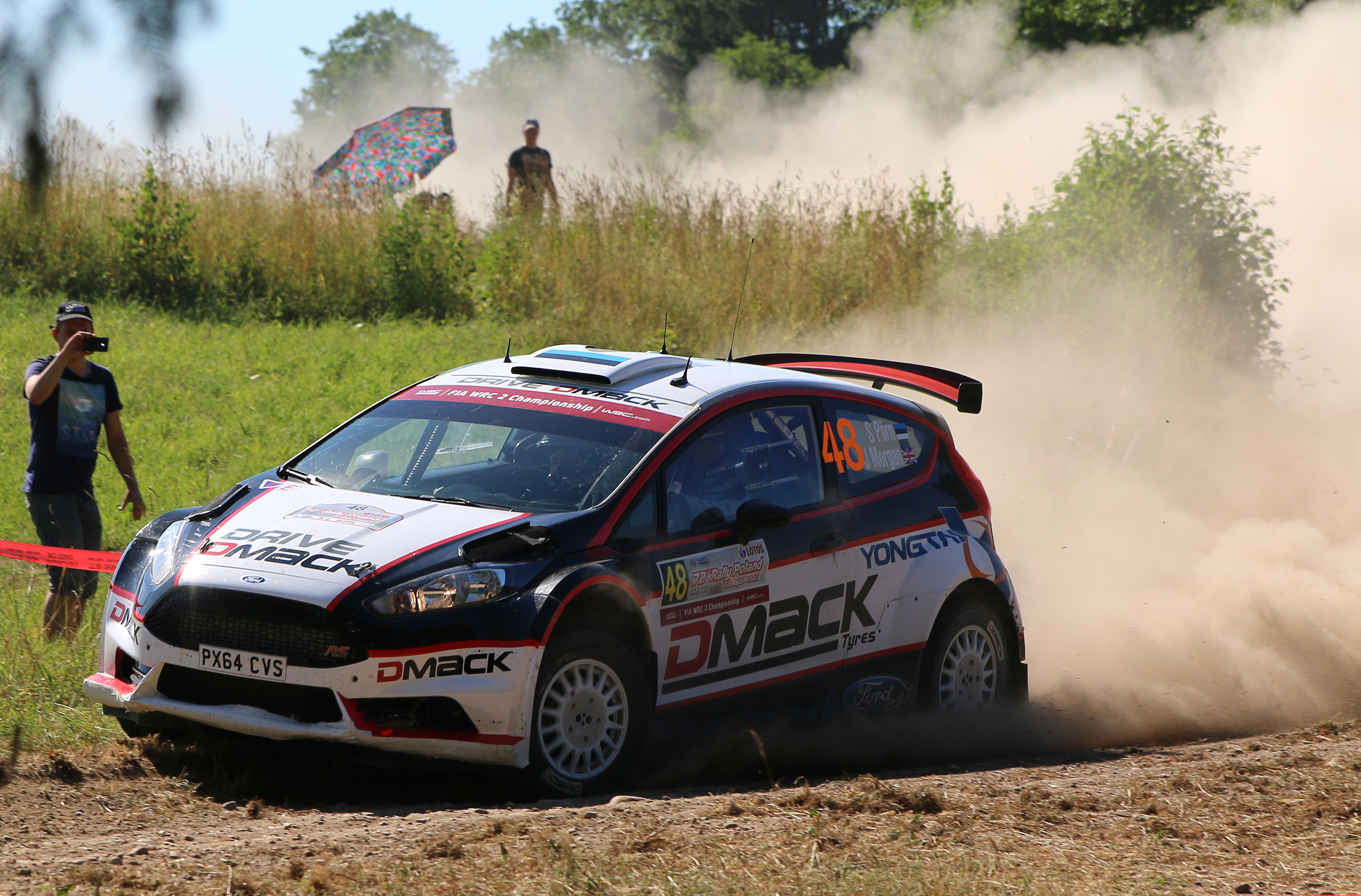
Pärn, 2015

Sander Pärn (born 19 February 1992) is a former Estonian rally driver.

== Career ==
Pärn won the Drive DMACK Cup in 2014 WRC season with Welsh co-driver, James Morgan. He was awarded 6 WRC-2 rallies with Ford Fiesta R5 for the 2015 season.

== Career results ==
=== WRC results ===
Year	Entrant	Car	1	2	3	4	5	6	7	8	9	10	11	12	13	WDC	Pts
2009	Sander Pärn	Citroën C2	IRE	NOR	CYP	POR	ARG	ITA	GRE	POL	FIN	AUS	ESP	GBR; 42		NC	0
2011	Sander Pärn	Subaru Impreza	SWE	MEX	POR	JOR	ITA	ARG	GRE	FIN; 30	GER	AUS	FRA	ESP	GBR	NC	0
2012	Sander Pärn	Subaru Impreza	MON	SWE	MEX	POR; 21	ARG	GRE	NZL	FIN; 19	GER	GBR	FRA	ITA	ESP	NC	0
2013	Sander Pärn	Ford Fiesta R2	MON	SWE	MEX	POR	ARG	GRE	ITA	FIN	GER	AUS	FRA	ESP; 20	GBR	NC	0
2014	Estonian Autosport Union	Ford Fiesta R2	MON	SWE	MEX	POR; 38	ARG	ITA	POL; 26	FIN; 16	GER; 32	AUS	FRA	ESP; 35	GBR	NC	0
2015	Drive Dmack	Ford Fiesta R5	MON	SWE	MEX	ARG	POR; 19	ITA; 29	POL; 22	FIN; 56	GER	AUS	FRA	ESP	GBR	NC	0
2016	Drive Dmack Trophy Team/ TAIF Motorsport	Ford Fiesta R5	MON	SWE; Ret	MEX	ARG	POR; Ret	ITA	POL; Ret	FIN	GER	FRA	ESP; 33	GBR; 20	AUS	NC	0

=== JWRC results ===
Year	Entrant	Car	1	2	3	4	5	6	Pos.	Points
2013	Sander Pärn	Ford Fiesta R2	POR; 8	GRE; 3	FIN; 2	GER; 6	FRA; 8	ESP; 3	3rd	68

=== Drive DMACK Cup results ===
Year	Entrant	Car	1	2	3	4	5	Pos.	Points
2014	Sander Pärn	Ford Fiesta R2	POR; 1	POL; 1	FIN; 1	GER; 2	ESP; 5	1st	120

=== WRC 2 results ===
Year	Entrant	Car	1	2	3	4	5	6	7	8	9	10	11	12	13	Pos	Points
2015	Drive Dmack	Ford Fiesta R5	MON	SWE	MEX	ARG	POR; 9	ITA	POL; 9	FIN; 12	GER	AUS	FRA	ESP	GBR	41st	4
2016	Drive Dmack Trophy Team/ TAIF Motorsport	Ford Fiesta R5	MON	SWE; Ret	MEX	ARG	POR; Ret	ITA	POL; Ret	FIN	GER	FRA	ESP; 7	GBR	AUS	36th	6
