= Drive DMACK Fiesta Trophy =

The Drive DMACK Fiesta Trophy (also known as the Drive DMACK Cup in 2014) was a complementary series to the FIA World Rally Championship (WRC) held since 2014 till 2016 WRC seasons. Drivers used the same cars produced by M-Sport - Ford Fiesta R2 and the same tyres provided by DMACK. The winner was entered in WRC-2 for DMACK World Rally Team the following season. It was created when Citroën won bid for official JWRC cars and M-Sport wanted to find use for trophy Fiestas.

== Champions ==
Year	Driver	Co-driver	Car
2014	(Estonia) Sander Pärn	(United Kingdom) James Morgan	Ford Fiesta R2
2015	(Norway) Marius Aasen	(Norway) Veronica Engan	Ford Fiesta R2T
2016	(United Kingdom) Osian Pryce	(United Kingdom) Dale Furniss	Ford Fiesta R2T

== Statistics ==
Round wins
	Driver	Total
1	(Estonia) Sander Pärn	3
2	(United Kingdom) Tom Cave	2
2	(Norway) Marius Aasen	2
2	(Finland) Max Vatanen	2
2	(United Kingdom) Osian Pryce	2
2	(United Kingdom) Jon Armstrong	2
7	(Spain) Nil Solans	1
7	(Belgium) Ghislain de Mevius	1

Stage wins
	Driver	Total
1	(United Kingdom) Tom Cave	45
2	(Finland) Max Vatanen	43
3	(United Kingdom) Osian Pryce	30
4	(Norway) Marius Aasen	28
5	(France) Quentin Gilbert	27
6	(United Kingdom) Jon Armstrong	23
7	(United Kingdom) Gus Greensmith	21
8	(Belgium) Ghislain de Mevius	20
9	(Estonia) Sander Pärn	17
10	(Spain) Yeray Lemes	16
11	(Portugal) Bernardo Sousa	16
12	(Netherlands) Mats Van Der Brand	9
13	(Spain) José Antonio Suárez	7
13	(Spain) Nil Solans	7
13	(France) Nicolas Ciamin	7
16	(Kenya) Karan Patel	4
16	(Norway) Oscar Solberg	4
16	(Poland) Jakub Brzeziński	4
19	(Australia) Brendan Reeves	2
19	(Lebanon) Nicolas Amiouni	2
19	(Netherlands) Kevin van Deijne	2
22	(Italy) Edoardo Bresolin	1

== See also ==
- FIA Rally Star
- Pirelli Star Driver
