= Max Vatanen =

Finnish rally driver

Personal information
- Nationality: (Finland) Finnish
- Born: September 26, 1990 (age 36)

World Rally Championship record
- Years active: 2014 – present
- Rallies: 18
- Championships: 0
- Rally wins: 0
- Podiums: 0
- Stage wins: 0
- Total points: 0
- First rally: 2014 Rally de Portugal

Max Vatanen (born 26 September 1990) is a Finnish rally driver. He made his WRC debut in 2014 Rally de Portugal driving a Ford Fiesta R2. His father is Ari Vatanen.

== Results ==
=== WRC results ===
Year	Entrant	Car	1	2	3	4	5	6	7	8	9	10	11	12	13	14	WDC	Points
2014	Max Vatanen	Ford Fiesta R2	MON	SWE	MEX	POR; Ret	ARG	ITA	POL; 32	FIN; 27	GER; 40	AUS	FRA	ESP; 33	GBR		-	0
2015	Max Vatanen	Ford Fiesta R2	MON; 34	SWE	MEX	ARG	POR; 29	ITA	POL; 38	FIN; 24	GER; 33	AUS	FRA	ESP; 46	GBR; 31		-	0
2016	Max Vatanen	Ford Fiesta R2	MON; 26	SWE	MEX	ARG	POR; 32	ITA	POL; 36	FIN; 32	GER; 40	CHN; C	FRA	ESP; 25	GBR	AUS	-	0
2017	Max Vatanen	Ford Fiesta R5	MON	SWE	MEX	FRA	ARG	POR; 33	ITA	POL	FIN; 17	GER	ESP; Ret	GBR	AUS		-	0
2018	Max Vatanen	Hyundai i20 R5	MON	SWE	MEX	FRA	ARG	POR; 29	ITA	FIN	GER	TUR	GBR	ESP	AUS		-	0*

=== Drive DMACK Cup results ===
Year	Entrant	Car	1	2	3	4	5	Pos.	Points
2014	Max Vatanen	Ford Fiesta R2	POR; Ret	POL; 4	FIN; 4	GER; 5	ESP; 4	4th	51
2015	Max Vatanen	Ford Fiesta R2	POR; 1	POL; 3	FIN; 3	GER; 3	ESP; 5	3rd	96
2016	Max Vatanen	Ford Fiesta R2	POR; 2	POL; 5	FIN; 1	GER; 2	ESP; 3	2nd	105
