= Marius Aasen =

Norwegian rally driver

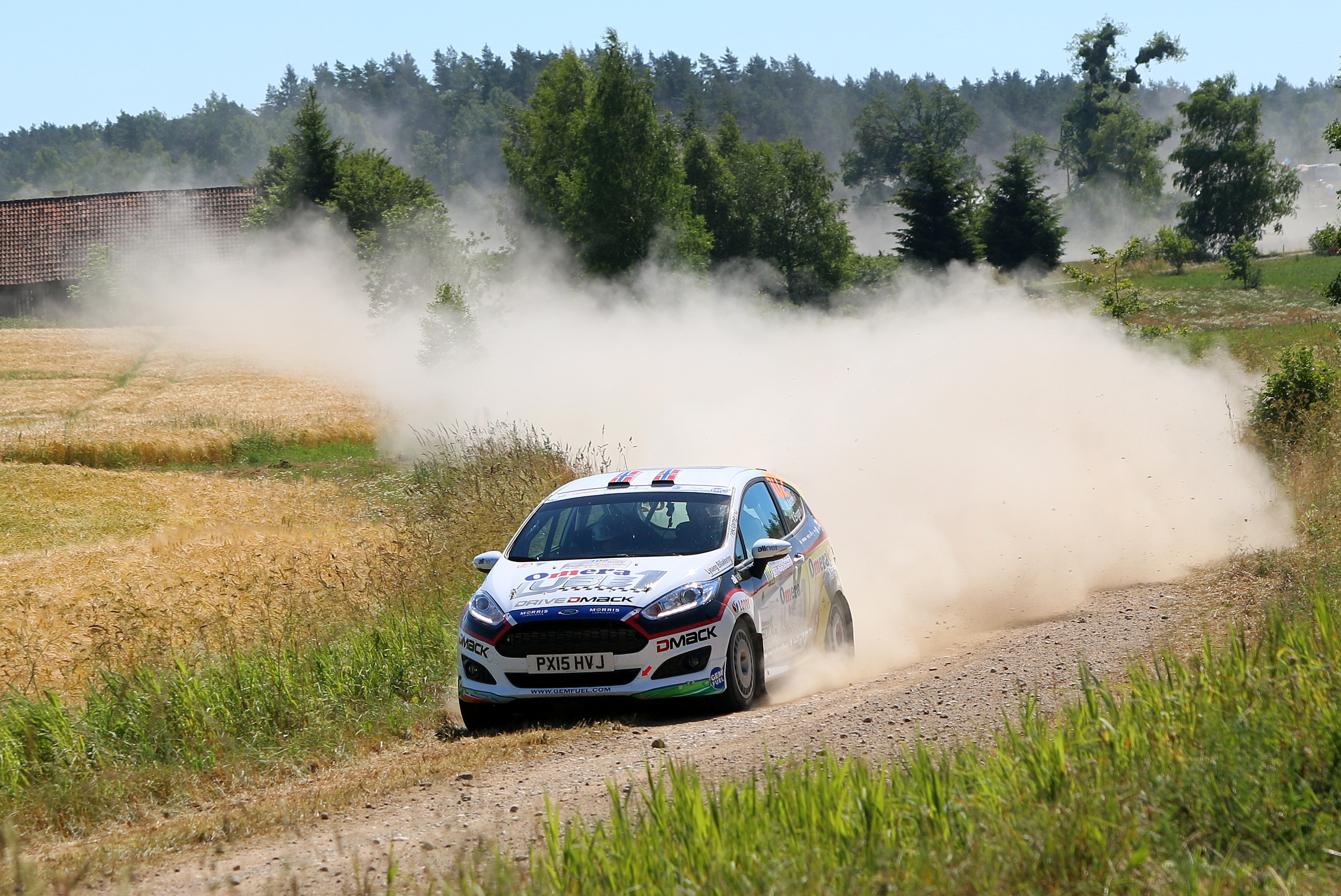

Personal information
- Nationality: Norwegian
- Born: 13 January 1992 (age 34)

World Rally Championship record
- Years active: 2010 – present
- Co-driver: Veronica Gulbæk Engan
- Teams: Drive DMACK Trophy Team
- Rallies: 24
- Championships: 0
- Rally wins: 0
- Podiums: 0
- Stage wins: 0
- Total points: 0
- First rally: 2010 Rally Sweden
- Last rally: 2017 Wales Rally GB
- Last updated on: 22 August 2018.

Marius Aasen (born 13 January 1992) is a Norwegian rally driver.

== Career results ==
=== WRC results ===
Year	Entrant	Car	1	2	3	4	5	6	7	8	9	10	11	12	13	WDC	Pts
2010	Marius Aasen	Subaru Impreza STi N14	SWE; 26	MEX	JOR	TUR	NZL	POR	BUL	FIN	GER	JPN	FRA	ESP	GBR	NC	0
2012	Marius Aasen	Ford Fiesta S2000	MON	SWE; Ret	MEX	POR	ARG	GRE	NZL	FIN	GER	GBR	FRA	ITA	ESP	NC	0
2013	Marius Aasen	Ford Fiesta R2	MON	SWE	MEX	POR	ARG	GRE; Ret	ITA	FIN	GER	AUS	FRA	ESP; 19	GBR	NC	0
2014	Marius Aasen	Ford Fiesta R2	MON	SWE	MEX	POR; 49	ARG	ITA	POL; 48	FIN; Ret	GER	AUS	FRA	ESP	GBR	NC	0
2015	Marius Aasen	Ford Fiesta R2	MON	SWE	MEX	ARG	POR; 31	ITA	POL; 31	FIN; 23	GER; 51	AUS	FRA	ESP; 26	GBR	NC	0
2016	Drive DMACK Trophy Team	Ford Fiesta R5	MON	SWE; 18	MEX	ARG	POR; 12	ITA; 18	POL; Ret	FIN; 14	GER	FRA	ESP; 30	GBR; 18	AUS	NC	0

=== SWRC results ===
Year	Entrant	Car	1	2	3	4	5	6	7	8	SWRC	Pts
2012	Marius Aasen	Ford Fiesta S2000	MON	SWE; Ret	POR	NZL	FIN	GBR	FRA	ESP	NC	0

=== JWRC results ===
Year	Entrant	Car	1	2	3	4	5	6	Pos.	Points
2013	Marius Aasen	Ford Fiesta R2	POR; 6	GRE; Ret	FIN; 5	GER; 10	FRA; 4	ESP; 2	5th	54

=== Drive DMACK Cup results ===
Year	Entrant	Car	1	2	3	4	5	Pos.	Points
2014	Marius Aasen	Ford Fiesta R2	POR; 7	POL; 8	FIN; Ret	GER	ESP	12th	0
2015	Marius Aasen	Ford Fiesta R2T	POR; 2	POL; 1	FIN; 2	GER; 5	ESP; 1	1st	132

=== WRC 2 results ===
Year	Entrant	Car	1	2	3	4	5	6	7	8	9	10	11	12	13	Pos	Points
2016	Drive DMACK Trophy Team	Ford Fiesta R5	MON	SWE; 8	MEX	ARG	POR; 3	ITA; 7	POL; Ret	FIN; 6	GER	FRA	ESP; 6	GBR; 5	AUS	9th	51
