= DMACK World Rally Team =

Rally team

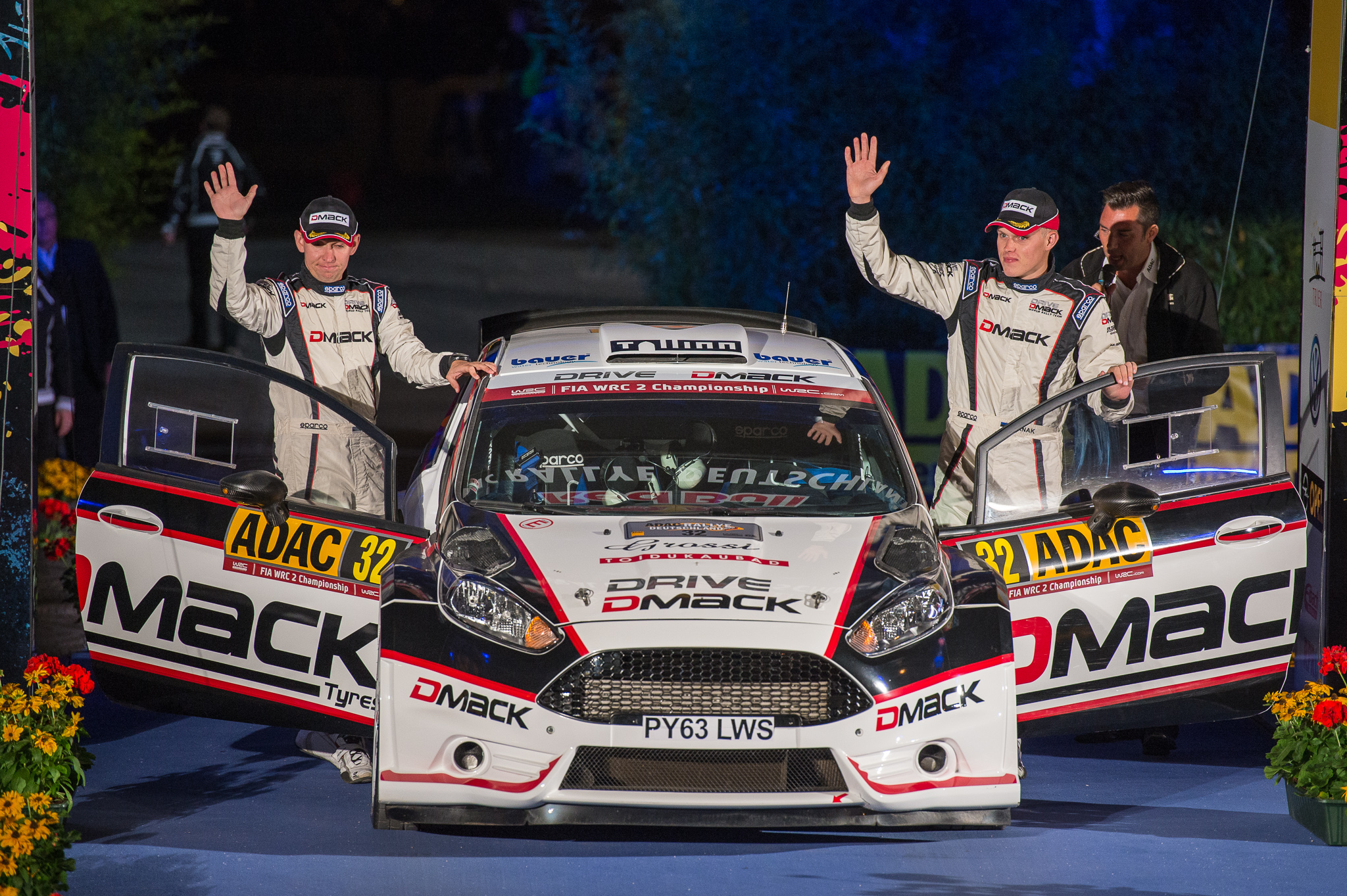
- Full name: DMACK World Rally Team
- Base: (United Kingdom) Great Britain
- Tyres: DMACK

World Rally Championship history
- Debut: 2012
- Last season: 2017
- Manufacturers' Championships: 0
- Drivers' Championships: 0
- Rally wins: 0

DMACK World Rally Team was a team that competed in the World Rally Championship since 2012 until 2017.

== History ==
Beginning with the 2011 season, DMACK began supplying tyres for the Scottish Rally Championship and the Production World Rally Championship. The company made its World Rally Championship debut at the 2011 Wales Rally GB on the car of Ott Tänak.

In 2017, DMack did not enter as a team, but M-Sport WRT driver Elfyn Evans drove with DMack tyres. He won the 2017 Wales Rally GB.

The team was disbanded by end of 2017.

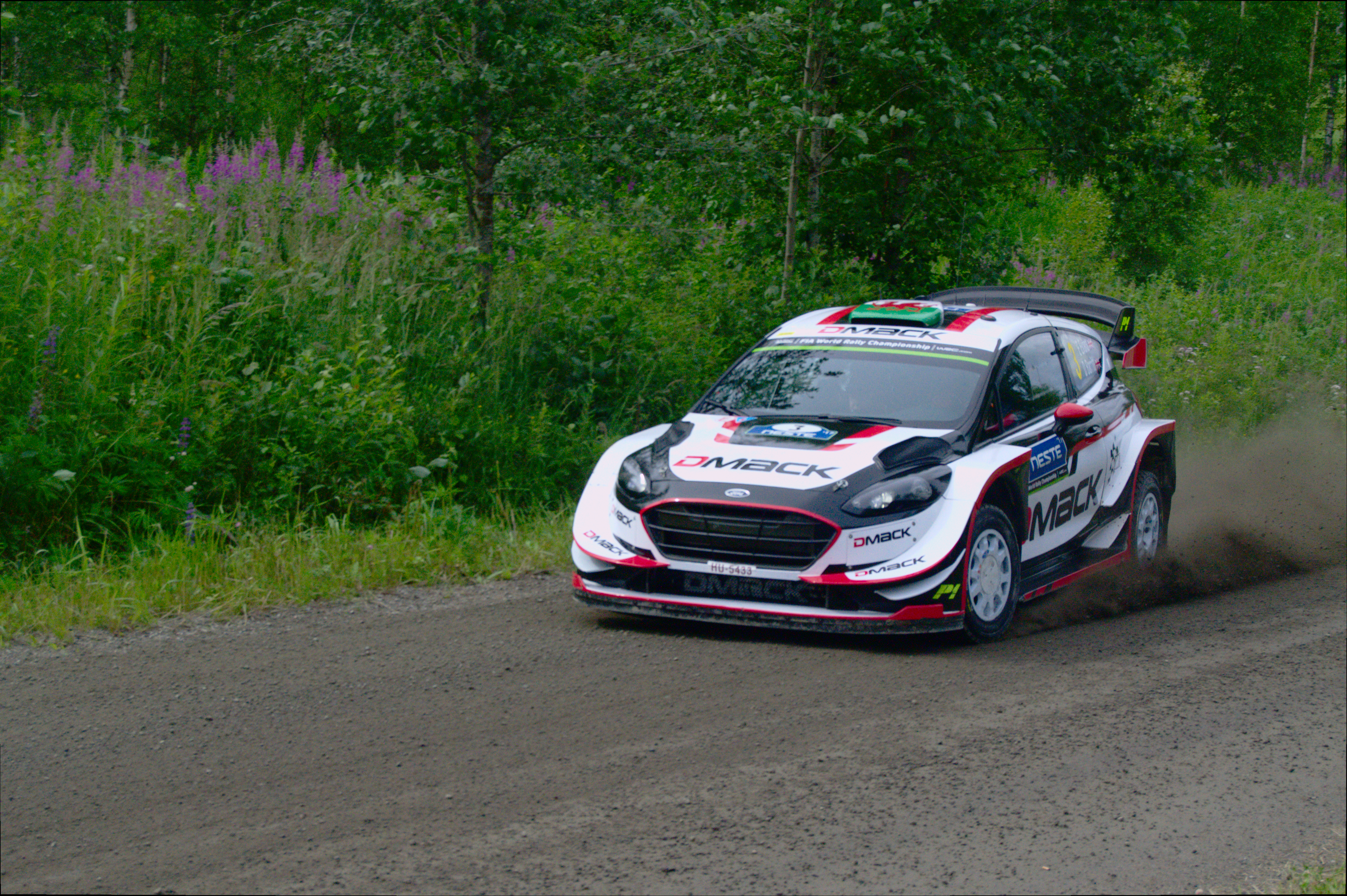
Ford Fiesta WRC of Elfyn Evans in 2017

== WRC results ==
Year	Entrant	Car	Driver	1	2	3	4	5	6	7	8	9	10	11	12	13	14	WRC	Points	Teams	Points
2012	-	Ford Fiesta RS WRC	(Finland) Jari Ketomaa	MON	SWE; Ret	MEX	POR; 9	ARG	GRE	NZL; 11	FIN; 8	GER	GBR	FRA	ITA	ESP		23rd	6	-	-
2012	-	Ford Fiesta RS WRC	(Czech Republic) Martin Prokop	MON	SWE	MEX	POR	ARG; 4	GRE	NZL	FIN	GER	GBR	FRA	ITA	ESP; 13		9th	46	-	-
2012	-	Ford Fiesta RS WRC	(Russia) Evgeny Novikov	MON	SWE	MEX	POR	ARG	GRE	NZL	FIN	GER	GBR	FRA	ITA	ESP; 10		6th	88	-	-
2013	Dmack - Autotek	Ford Fiesta R5	(Finland) Jari Ketomaa	MON	SWE	MEX	POR	ARG	GRE	ITA	FIN; 7	GER	AUS	FRA	ESP	GBR; 9		18th	8	-	-
2014	Drive Dmack	Ford Fiesta R5	(Estonia) Ott Tänak			MEX; 15		ARG; 17	ITA; 21	POL; 11	FIN; 12	GER; 10	AUS; Ret	FRA	ESP			15th	17	-	-
2014	Drive Dmack	Ford Fiesta RS WRC	(Estonia) Ott Tänak													GBR; 7		15th	17	-	-
2016	DMACK World Rally Team	Ford Fiesta RS WRC	(Estonia) Ott Tänak	MON; 7	SWE; 5	MEX; 6	ARG; 15	POR; Ret	ITA; 5	POL; 2	FIN; Ret	GER; 23	CHN; C	FRA; 10	ESP; 6	GBR; 2	AUS; 7	8th	88	6th	98

== WRC2 results ==
Year	Entrant	Car	No	Driver	1	2	3	4	5	6	7	8	9	10	11	12	13	14	WRC2	Points	Teams	Points
2013	Dmack - Autotek	Ford Fiesta RRC	47	(Norway) Eyvind Brynildsen	MON	SWE; Ret	MEX	POR	ARG	GRE	ITA								26th	13	8th	61
2013	Dmack - Autotek	Ford Fiesta R5	47	(Norway) Eyvind Brynildsen								FIN; 10	GER; Ret	AUS	FRA	ESP	GBR; 4		26th	13	8th	61
2013	Dmack - Autotek	Ford Fiesta R5	88	(Finland) Jari Ketomaa	MON	SWE	MEX	POR	ARG	GRE	ITA	FIN; 1	GER	AUS	FRA	ESP	GBR; 2		11th	43	8th	61
2014	Drive Dmack	Ford Fiesta R5		(Finland) Jari Ketomaa	MON	SWE; 2	MEX	POR; 2	ARG; 11	ITA	POL; 2	FIN; 2	GER	AUS; 2	FRA	ESP	GBR; 1		2nd	115	1st	183
2014	Drive Dmack	Ford Fiesta R5		(Estonia) Ott Tänak	MON	SWE	MEX; 4	POR	ARG; 8	ITA; 8	POL; 1	FIN; 3	GER; 2	AUS; Ret	FRA	ESP	GBR		6th	78	1st	183
2015	Drive Dmack	Ford Fiesta RRC		(Norway) Eyvind Brynildsen	MON	SWE; 2	MEX	ARG	POR	ITA	POL	FIN; Ret	GER	AUS	FRA	ESP	GBR		20th	18	3rd	113
2015	Drive Dmack	Ford Fiesta R5		(Finland) Jari Ketomaa	MON	SWE; 1	MEX; 3	ARG; 3	POR; Ret	ITA	POL; 4	FIN	GER	AUS	FRA	ESP; 12	GBR; WD		6th	67	3rd	113
2015	Drive Dmack	Ford Fiesta R5		(Peru) Nicolás Fuchs	MON	SWE	MEX	ARG; Ret	POR	ITA	POL	FIN	GER	AUS	FRA	ESP	GBR; 6		12th	46	3rd	113
2015	Drive Dmack	Ford Fiesta R5		(Estonia) Sander Pärn	MON	SWE	MEX	ARG	POR; 9	ITA	POL; 9	FIN; 12	GER	AUS	FRA	ESP	GBR		41st	4	3rd	113
2015	Drive DMACK 2	Ford Fiesta R5		(Australia) Scott Pedder	MON	SWE	MEX	ARG	POR	ITA	POL	FIN	GER	AUS; 6	FRA	ESP	GBR		18th	20	19th	15
2016	Drive Dmack	Ford Fiesta R5		(Estonia) Sander Pärn	MON	SWE; Ret	MEX	ARG	POR; Ret	ITA	POL	FIN	GER	CHN; C	FRA	ESP; 7	GBR	AUS	36th	6	4th	87
2016	Drive Dmack	Ford Fiesta R5		(Norway) Marius Aasen	MON	SWE; 8	MEX	ARG	POR; 3	ITA; 7	POL; Ret	FIN; 6	GER	CHN; C	FRA	ESP; 6	GBR; 5	AUS	9th	51	4th	87
2016	Drive Dmack	Ford Fiesta R5		(Estonia) Karl Kruuda	MON	SWE	MEX	ARG	POR	ITA; 3	POL; 10	FIN; Ret	GER	CHN; C	FRA	ESP	GBR	AUS	20th	16	4th	87
2016	Drive Dmack	Ford Fiesta R5		(United Kingdom) Osian Pryce	MON	SWE	MEX	ARG	POR	ITA	POL	FIN	GER	CHN; C	FRA	ESP	GBR; Ret	AUS	-	0	4th	87
2017	Drive DMACK Trophy Team	Ford Fiesta R5		(Finland) Max Vatanen	MON	SWE	MEX	FRA	ARG	POR; 12	ITA	POL	FIN	GER	ESP	GBR; WD	AUS		-	0	9th	31
2017	Drive DMACK Trophy Team	Ford Fiesta R5		(United Kingdom) Osian Pryce	MON	SWE	MEX	FRA	ARG	POR	ITA	POL; Ret	FIN; 4	GER	ESP	GBR	AUS		23rd	12	9th	31
2017	Drive DMACK Trophy Team	Ford Fiesta R5		(United Kingdom) Jon Armstrong	MON	SWE	MEX	FRA	ARG	POR	ITA	POL	FIN	GER; 14	ESP; 9	GBR	AUS		39th	2	9th	31

== See also ==
- M-Sport World Rally Team
