= 2013 Junior WRC Championship =

International rallying competition

The 2013 FIA Junior WRC Championship was the first season of the Junior WRC Championship, a rallying championship organised and governed by the Fédération Internationale de l'Automobile in association with M-Sport, running in support of the World Rally Championship. It replaced WRC Academy as the Junior category championship at world level.

The Junior WRC Championship was open to drivers under the age of twenty-six. All teams contested the same six events – with their best five results counting towards their final championship position – in identical Ford Fiesta R2 cars, prepared by M-Sport. Hankook supplied tyres for all competitors.

Pontus Tidemand secured the drivers' championship after winning at the Rallye de France-Alsace.

== Calendar ==
The calendar for the 2013 Junior WRC Championship consisted of six rounds, run alongside the World Rally Championship.

| Round | WRC Round | Dates | Rally name | Base | Surface |
|---|---|---|---|---|---|
| 1 | 4 | 12–13 April | Rally de Portugal | Faro, Algarve | Gravel |
| 2 | 6 | 31 May–2 June | (Greece) Acropolis Rally | Loutraki, Corinthia | Gravel |
| 3 | 8 | 1–3 August | Rally Finland | Jyväskylä, Keski-Suomi | Gravel |
| 4 | 9 | 22–25 August | (Germany) Rallye Deutschland | Trier, Rhineland-Palatinate | Tarmac |
| 5 | 11 | 3–6 October | Rallye de France Alsace | Strasbourg, Alsace | Tarmac |
| 6 | 12 | 25–27 October | (Spain) Rally de Catalunya | Salou, Tarragona | Mixed |

== Teams and drivers ==
The following teams and drivers took part in the 2013 Junior WRC Championship season:

| Team | No. | Driver | Co-driver | Rounds |
|---|---|---|---|---|
| (Estonia) Sander Pärn | 100 | (Estonia) Sander Pärn | (Estonia) Ken Järveoja | 1–6 |
| (Sweden) Pontus Tidemand | 102 | (Sweden) Pontus Tidemand | (Norway) Ola Fløene | 1–6 |
| (Slovakia) Styllex Motorsport | 103 | (Slovakia) Martin Koči | (Czech Republic) Petr Starý | 1–5 |
| (Slovakia) Styllex Motorsport | 103 | (Slovakia) Martin Koči | (Czech Republic) Lukas Kostka | 6 |
| (Finland) Andreas Amberg | 104 | (Finland) Andreas Amberg | (Finland) Mikko Lukka | 1–3 |
| (Spain) ACSM Rallye Team | 105 | (Spain) José Antonio Suárez | (Spain) Cándido Carrera | 1–6 |
| (Turkey) Castrol Ford Team Türkiye | 106 | (Turkey) Murat Bostancı | (Turkey) Onur Vatansever | 1–6 |
| (Switzerland) Michaël Burri | 107 | (Switzerland) Michaël Burri | (France) Gabin Moreau | 1–6 |
| (Finland) Niko-Pekka Nieminen | 108 | (Finland) Niko-Pekka Nieminen | (Finland) Mikael Korhonen | 1–2, 4–6 |
| (Finland) Niko-Pekka Nieminen | 108 | (Finland) Niko-Pekka Nieminen | (Finland) Ari Koponen | 3 |
| (Norway) Marius Aasen | 109 | (Norway) Marius Aasen | (Norway) Marlene Engan | 1–6 |
| (Spain) Yeray Lemes | 110 | (Spain) Yeray Lemes | (Spain) Rogelio Peñate | 1–6 |
| (Belgium) Pieter-Jan-Michiel Cracco | 111 | (Belgium) Pieter-Jan-Michiel Cracco | (Belgium) Frederic Miclotte | 4 |
| (Luxembourg) Hugo Arellano | 112 | (Luxembourg) Hugo Arellano | (Belgium) Daniel Arens | 5 |

== Rally summaries ==
| Round | Rally name | Podium finishers | | | | | Statistics | | | |
| Round | Rally name | Pos. | No. | Crew | Team | Time | Stages | Length | Starters | Finishers |
|---|---|---|---|---|---|---|---|---|---|---|
| 1 | Rally de Portugal (12–13 April) — Results and report | 1 | 102 | (Sweden) Pontus Tidemand (Norway) Ola Fløene | (Sweden) Pontus Tidemand | 3:01:23.6 | 11 | 239.09 km | 10 | 8 |
| 1 | Rally de Portugal (12–13 April) — Results and report | 2 | 105 | (Spain) José Antonio Suárez (Spain) Cándido Carrera | (Spain) ACSM Rallye Team | 3:03:50.5 | 11 | 239.09 km | 10 | 8 |
| 1 | Rally de Portugal (12–13 April) — Results and report | 3 | 110 | (Spain) Yeray Lemes (Spain) Rogelio Peñate | (Spain) Yeray Lemes | 3:04:34.3 | 11 | 239.09 km | 10 | 8 |
| 2 | (Greece) Acropolis Rally (31 May–2 June) — Results and report | 1 | 105 | (Spain) José Antonio Suárez (Spain) Cándido Carrera | (Spain) ACSM Rallye Team | 4:33:17.8 | 10 | 231.75 km | 10 | 6 |
| 2 | (Greece) Acropolis Rally (31 May–2 June) — Results and report | 2 | 102 | (Sweden) Pontus Tidemand (Norway) Ola Fløene | (Sweden) Pontus Tidemand | 4:34:22.0 | 10 | 231.75 km | 10 | 6 |
| 2 | (Greece) Acropolis Rally (31 May–2 June) — Results and report | 3 | 100 | (Estonia) Sander Pärn (Estonia) Ken Järveoja | (Estonia) Sander Pärn | 4:41:55.2 | 10 | 231.75 km | 10 | 6 |
| 3 | Rally Finland (1–3 August) — Results and report | 1 | 104 | (Finland) Andreas Amberg (Finland) Mikko Lukka | (Finland) Andreas Amberg | 2:34:51.9 | 19 | 259.11 km | 10 | 9 |
| 3 | Rally Finland (1–3 August) — Results and report | 2 | 100 | (Estonia) Sander Pärn (Estonia) Ken Järveoja | (Estonia) Sander Pärn | 2:37:16.5 | 19 | 259.11 km | 10 | 9 |
| 3 | Rally Finland (1–3 August) — Results and report | 3 | 102 | (Sweden) Pontus Tidemand (Norway) Ola Fløene | (Sweden) Pontus Tidemand | 2:37:44.4 | 19 | 259.11 km | 10 | 9 |
| 4 | (Germany) Rallye Deutschland (22–25 August) — Results and report | 1 | 102 | (Sweden) Pontus Tidemand (Norway) Ola Fløene | (Sweden) Pontus Tidemand | 3:09:26.8 | (14)^{†} 13 | (322.70 km)^{†} 281.62 km | 10 | 10 |
| 4 | (Germany) Rallye Deutschland (22–25 August) — Results and report | 2 | 107 | (Switzerland) Michaël Burri (France) Gabin Moreau | (Switzerland) Michaël Burri | 3:11:14.3 | (14)^{†} 13 | (322.70 km)^{†} 281.62 km | 10 | 10 |
| 4 | (Germany) Rallye Deutschland (22–25 August) — Results and report | 3 | 110 | (Spain) Yeray Lemes (Spain) Rogelio Peñate | (Spain) Yeray Lemes | 3:11:38.0 | (14)^{†} 13 | (322.70 km)^{†} 281.62 km | 10 | 10 |
| 5 | Rallye de France Alsace (3–6 October) — Results and report | 1 | 102 | (Sweden) Pontus Tidemand (Norway) Ola Fløene | (Sweden) Pontus Tidemand | 2:41:37.4 | 14 | 312.14 km | 10 | 9 |
| 5 | Rallye de France Alsace (3–6 October) — Results and report | 2 | 112 | (Luxembourg) Hugo Arellano (France) Gaëtan Houssin | (Luxembourg) Hugo Arellano | 2:42:19.7 | 14 | 312.14 km | 10 | 9 |
| 5 | Rallye de France Alsace (3–6 October) — Results and report | 3 | 110 | (Spain) Yeray Lemes (Spain) Rogelio Peñate | (Spain) Yeray Lemes | 2:42:48.0 | 14 | 312.14 km | 10 | 9 |
| 6 | (Spain) Rally de Catalunya (25–27 October) — Results and report | 1 | 110 | (Spain) Yeray Lemes (Spain) Rogelio Peñate | (Spain) Yeray Lemes | 4:03:59.8 | 15 | 355.92 km | 9 | 5 |
| 6 | (Spain) Rally de Catalunya (25–27 October) — Results and report | 2 | 109 | (Norway) Marius Aasen (Norway) Marlene Engan | (Norway) Marius Aasen | 4:06:14.5 | 15 | 355.92 km | 9 | 5 |
| 6 | (Spain) Rally de Catalunya (25–27 October) — Results and report | 3 | 100 | (Estonia) Sander Pärn (Estonia) Ken Järveoja | (Estonia) Sander Pärn | 4:07:18.8 | 15 | 355.92 km | 9 | 5 |

== Championship standings ==
Points are awarded to the top 10 classified finishers, and one point for winning a stage. Five best results of the season are counted towards the final score.

| Position | 1st | 2nd | 3rd | 4th | 5th | 6th | 7th | 8th | 9th | 10th | Stage win |
| Points | 25 | 18 | 15 | 12 | 10 | 8 | 6 | 4 | 2 | 1 | 1 |

=== Drivers' championship ===
| Pos. | Driver | POR (Portugal) | GRE (Greece) | FIN (Finland) | GER (Germany) | FRA (France) | ESP (Spain) | Drops | Points |
|---|---|---|---|---|---|---|---|---|---|
| 1 | (Sweden) Pontus Tidemand | 1 ^{5} | 2 ^{8} | 3 ^{6} | 1 ^{3} | 1 ^{1} | Ret ^{1} | 1 | 131 |
| 2 | (Spain) Yeray Lemes | 3 ^{2} | Ret ^{1} | 4 ^{1} | 3 ^{5} | 3 ^{7} | 1 ^{7} | 1 | 104 |
| 3 | (Estonia) Sander Pärn | 8 | 3 | 2 ^{6} | 6 | 8 | 3 ^{2} | 4 | 68 |
| 4 | (Spain) José Antonio Suárez | 2 ^{2} | 1 ^{1} | 9 | 5 ^{5} | Ret^{5} | Ret^{1} | 1 | 68 |
| 5 | (Norway) Marius Aasen | 6 ^{1} | Ret | 5 | 10 | 4 ^{1} | 2 ^{3} | 0 | 54 |
| 6 | (Slovakia) Martin Koči | 5 | 6 | 7 | 4 | 5 | 4 | 6 | 52 |
| 7 | (Switzerland) Michaël Burri | Ret | 4 | 6 | 2 | 6 | Ret | 0 | 46 |
| 8 | (Finland) Niko-Pekka Nieminen | 7 | 5 | 8 | 8 | 9 | Ret | 0 | 26 |
| 9 | (Turkey) Murat Bostancı | Ret | Ret | Ret ^{1} | 7 | 7 | 5 ^{1} | 0 | 24 |
| EX | (Finland) Andreas Amberg | 4 | Ret | 1 ^{5} | WD^{†} | | | | 0 |
| Pos. | Driver | POR (Portugal) | GRE (Greece) | FIN (Finland) | GER (Germany) | FRA (France) | ESP (Spain) | Drops | Points |

Notes

- ^{1} refers to the number of stages won, where a bonus point is awarded per stage win.
- ^{†} Driver withdrew from the event, and was excluded from the championship.

=== Co-drivers' championship ===
| Pos. | Co-driver | POR (Portugal) | GRE (Greece) | FIN (Finland) | GER (Germany) | FRA (France) | ESP (Spain) | Drops | Points |
|---|---|---|---|---|---|---|---|---|---|
| 1 | (Norway) Ola Fløene | 1 ^{5} | 2 ^{8} | 3 ^{6} | 1 ^{3} | 1 ^{1} | Ret ^{1} | 1 | 131 |
| 2 | (Spain) Rogelio Peñate | 3 ^{2} | Ret ^{1} | 4 ^{1} | 3 ^{5} | 3 ^{7} | 1 ^{7} | 1 | 104 |
| 3 | (Estonia) Ken Järveoja | 8 | 3 | 2 ^{6} | 6 | 8 | 3 ^{2} | 4 | 68 |
| 4 | (Spain) Cándido Carrera | 2 ^{2} | 1 ^{1} | 9 | 5 ^{5} | Ret^{5} | Ret^{1} | 1 | 68 |
| 5 | (Norway) Marlene Engan | 6 ^{1} | Ret | 5 | 10 | 4 ^{1} | 2 ^{3} | 0 | 54 |
| 6 | (France) Gabin Moreau | Ret | 4 | 6 | 2 | 6 | Ret | 0 | 46 |
| 7 | (Finland) Mikko Lukka | 4 | Ret | 1 ^{5} | WD | | | | 42 |
| 8 | (Czech Republic) Petr Starý | 5 | 6 | 7 | 4 | | | | 36 |
| 9 | (Turkey) Onur Vatansever | Ret | Ret | Ret ^{1} | 7 | 7 | 5 ^{1} | 0 | 24 |
| 10 | (Finland) Mikael Korhonen | 7 | 5 | | 8 | 9 | Ret | | 22 |
| 11 | (Czech Republic) Lukas Kostka | | | | | | 4 | | 12 |
| Pos. | Co-driver | POR (Portugal) | GRE (Greece) | FIN (Finland) | GER (Germany) | FRA (France) | ESP (Spain) | Drops | Points |

Notes

- ^{1} refers to the number of stages won, where a bonus point is awarded per stage win.
