= 2015 Drive DMACK Fiesta Trophy =

The 2015 Drive DMACK Fiesta Trophy was the second season of the Drive DMACK Fiesta Trophy, an auto racing championship recognized by the Fédération Internationale de l'Automobile, running in support of the World Rally Championship. It uses Ford Fiesta R2Ts.

The second title was won by Norway's Marius Aasen and Veronica Engan, his lady co-driver. Runner up for the second year in a row was Wales's Tom Cave, third was Finn Max Vatanen.

== Drivers ==
The following drivers took part in the championship.

No.	Driver	Co-driver	Rounds
101	(United Kingdom) Tom Cave	(United Kingdom) Craig Parry	All
102	(Norway) Marius Aasen	(Norway) Veronica Engan	All
103	(Finland) Max Vatanen	(France) Jacques-Julien Renucci	All
104	(Spain) Nil Solans	(Spain) Miquel Ibáñez	1-2
106	(Belgium) Ghislain de Mevius	(Belgium) Geoffrey Brion	1
106	(Belgium) Ghislain de Mevius	(Belgium) Johan Jalet	2-5
107	(Netherlands) Mats van den Brand	(Belgium) Martijn Wydaeghe	All
108	(Italy) Edoardo Bresolin	(Italy) Rudy Pollet	1-3
109	(Lebanon) Nicolas Amiouni	(Lebanon) Joseph Matar	1
110	(South Africa) Ashley Haigh-Smith	(South Africa) Damian van Ass	2
111	(Netherlands) Kevin van Deijne	(Netherlands) Harmen Scholtalbers	1-2
111	(Netherlands) Kevin van Deijne	(Netherlands) Hein Verschuuren	3-5
112	(United States) Will Hudson	(Italy) Alex Gelsomino	1-4
114	(United Kingdom) Gus Greensmith	(United Kingdom) Elliott Edmondson	All
115	(Slovenia) Tim Novak	(Slovenia) Uroš Ocvirk	4
116	(Australia) Brendan Reeves	(Australia) Rhiannon Gelsomino	5

=== FIA Drive DMACK Cup for Drivers ===
Pos.	Driver	POR (Portugal)	POL (Poland)	FIN (Finland)	DEU (Germany)	ESP (Spain)	Points
1	(Norway) Marius Aasen	2	1	2	5	1	132
2	(United Kingdom) Tom Cave	5	2	1	Ret	3	115
3	(Finland) Max Vatanen	1	3	3	3	5	96
4	(Belgium) Ghislain de Mevius	Ret	5	4	1	9	80
5	(Netherlands) Kevin van Deijne	6	6	5	6	4	53
6	(United Kingdom) Gus Greensmith	4	4	Ret	Ret	7	48
7	(Netherlands) Mats van den Brand	7	Ret	6	2	Ret	39
8	(Italy) Edoardo Bresolin	8	Ret	7		6	1
9	(United States) Will Hudson	Ret	Ret	Ret	4		-13
10	(Spain) Nil Solans	3	8				-52
11	(Lebanon) Nicolas Amiouni	9	7	Ret			-67
-	(Australia) Brendan Reeves					2	-
-	(Slovenia) Tim Novak				Ret		-
Pos.	Driver	POR (Portugal)	POL (Poland)	FIN (Finland)	DEU (Germany)	ESP (Spain)	Points

Key
Colour	Result
Gold	Winner
Silver	2nd place
Bronze	3rd place
Green	Points finish
Blue	Non-points finish
Blue	Non-classified finish (NC)
Purple	Did not finish (Ret)
Black	Excluded (EX)
Black	Disqualified (DSQ)
White	Did not start (DNS)
White	Cancelled (C)
Blank	Withdrew entry from the event (WD)
