= 2016 Tour de Corse =

Motor rally competition

2016 Tour de Corse 59ème Tour de Corse
Round 10 of the 2016 World Rally Championship
← Previous event	Next event →
- Rally base: (France) Bastia, Haute-Corse
- Dates run: 30 September 2016 – 2 October 2016
- Stages: 10 (390.92 km; 242.91 miles)
- Stage surface: Tarmac

Overall results
- Overall winner: (France) Sébastien Ogier (France) Julien Ingrassia (Germany) Volkswagen Motorsport

The 2016 Tour de Corse (formally the 59ème Tour de Corse) was the tenth round of the 2016 World Rally Championship. The race was held over four days between 30 September and 2 October 2016, and was based in Bastia, Corsica, France. Volkswagen's Sébastien Ogier won the race, his 36th win in the World Rally Championship.

== Overall standings ==
Pos.	No.	Driver	Co-driver	Team	Car	Class	Time	Difference	Points
Overall classification
1	1	(France) Sébastien Ogier	(France) Julien Ingrassia	(Germany) Volkswagen Motorsport	Volkswagen Polo R WRC	WRC	4:07:17.0		26
2	3	(Belgium) Thierry Neuville	(Belgium) Nicolas Gilsoul	(Germany) Hyundai Motorsport	Hyundai i20 WRC	WRC	4:08:03.4	+46.4	18
3	9	(Norway) Andreas Mikkelsen	(Norway) Anders Jæger	(Germany) Volkswagen Motorsport II	Volkswagen Polo R WRC	WRC	4:08:27.0	+1:10.0	17
4	2	(Finland) Jari-Matti Latvala	(Finland) Miikka Anttila	(Germany) Volkswagen Motorsport	Volkswagen Polo R WRC	WRC	4:08:52.6	+1:35.6	12
5	8	(Republic of Ireland) Craig Breen	(United Kingdom) Scott Martin	(France) Abu Dhabi Total World Rally Team	Citroën DS3 WRC	WRC	4:09:35.6	+2:18.6	10
6	20	(New Zealand) Hayden Paddon	(New Zealand) John Kennard	(Germany) Hyundai Motorsport N	Hyundai i20 WRC	WRC	4:09:53.1	+2:36.1	8
7	4	(Spain) Dani Sordo	(Spain) Marc Martí	(Germany) Hyundai Motorsport	Hyundai i20 WRC	WRC	4:10:23.9	+3:06.9	6
8	6	(France) Eric Camilli	(France) Benjamin Veillas	(United Kingdom) M-Sport World Rally Team	Ford Fiesta RS WRC	WRC	4:12:10.9	+4:53.9	4
9	5	(Norway) Mads Østberg	(Norway) Ola Fløene	(United Kingdom) M-Sport World Rally Team	Ford Fiesta RS WRC	WRC	4:12:54.7	+5:37.7	2
10	12	(Estonia) Ott Tänak	(Estonia) Raigo Mõlder	(United Kingdom) DMACK World Rally Team	Ford Fiesta RS WRC	WRC	4:13:43.6	+6:26.6	1
16	7	(United Kingdom) Kris Meeke	(Republic of Ireland) Paul Nagle	(France) Abu Dhabi Total World Rally Team	Citroën DS3 WRC	WRC	4:29:52.2	+22:35.2	3

== Special stages ==
Day	Stage	Name	Length	Winner	Car	Time	Rally leader
Leg 1 (30 Sep)	SS1	Acqua Doria - Albittreccia 1	49.72 km	(France) Sébastien Ogier	Volkswagen Polo R WRC	30:24.1	(France) Sébastien Ogier
Leg 1 (30 Sep)	SS2	Plage du Liamone - Sarrola-Carcopino 1	29.12 km	(France) Sébastien Ogier	Volkswagen Polo R WRC	18:39.6	(France) Sébastien Ogier
Leg 1 (30 Sep)	SS3	Acqua Doria - Albittreccia 2	49.72 km	(France) Sébastien Ogier	Volkswagen Polo R WRC	30:11.6	(France) Sébastien Ogier
Leg 1 (30 Sep)	SS4	Plage du Liamone - Sarrola-Carcopino 2	29.12 km	(France) Sébastien Ogier	Volkswagen Polo R WRC	18:37.5	(France) Sébastien Ogier
Leg 2 (1 Oct)	SS5	Orezza - La Porta - Valle di Rostino 1	53.72 km	(United Kingdom) Kris Meeke	Citroën DS3 WRC	35:36.5	(France) Sébastien Ogier
Leg 2 (1 Oct)	SS6	Novella - Pietralba 1	30.80 km	(France) Sébastien Ogier (Norway) Andreas Mikkelsen	Volkswagen Polo R WRC	18:26.2	(France) Sébastien Ogier
Leg 2 (1 Oct)	SS7	Orezza - La Porta - Valle di Rostino 2	53.72 km	(France) Sébastien Ogier	Volkswagen Polo R WRC	35:38.1	(France) Sébastien Ogier
Leg 2 (1 Oct)	SS8	Novella - Pietralba 2	30.80 km	(Belgium) Thierry Neuville	Hyundai i20 WRC	19:06.1	(France) Sébastien Ogier
Leg 3 (2 Oct)	SS9	Antisanti - Poggio di Nazza	53.78 km	(United Kingdom) Kris Meeke	Citroën DS3 WRC	33:11.6	(France) Sébastien Ogier
Leg 3 (2 Oct)	SS10	Porto-Vecchio - Palombaggia (Power-Stage)	10.42 km	(United Kingdom) Kris Meeke	Citroën DS3 WRC	6:09.0	(France) Sébastien Ogier
