= 2016 Rally Italia Sardegna =

Motor rally competition

2016 Rally di Sardegna 13º Rally Italia Sardegna
Round 6 of the 2016 World Rally Championship season
← Previous event	Next event →
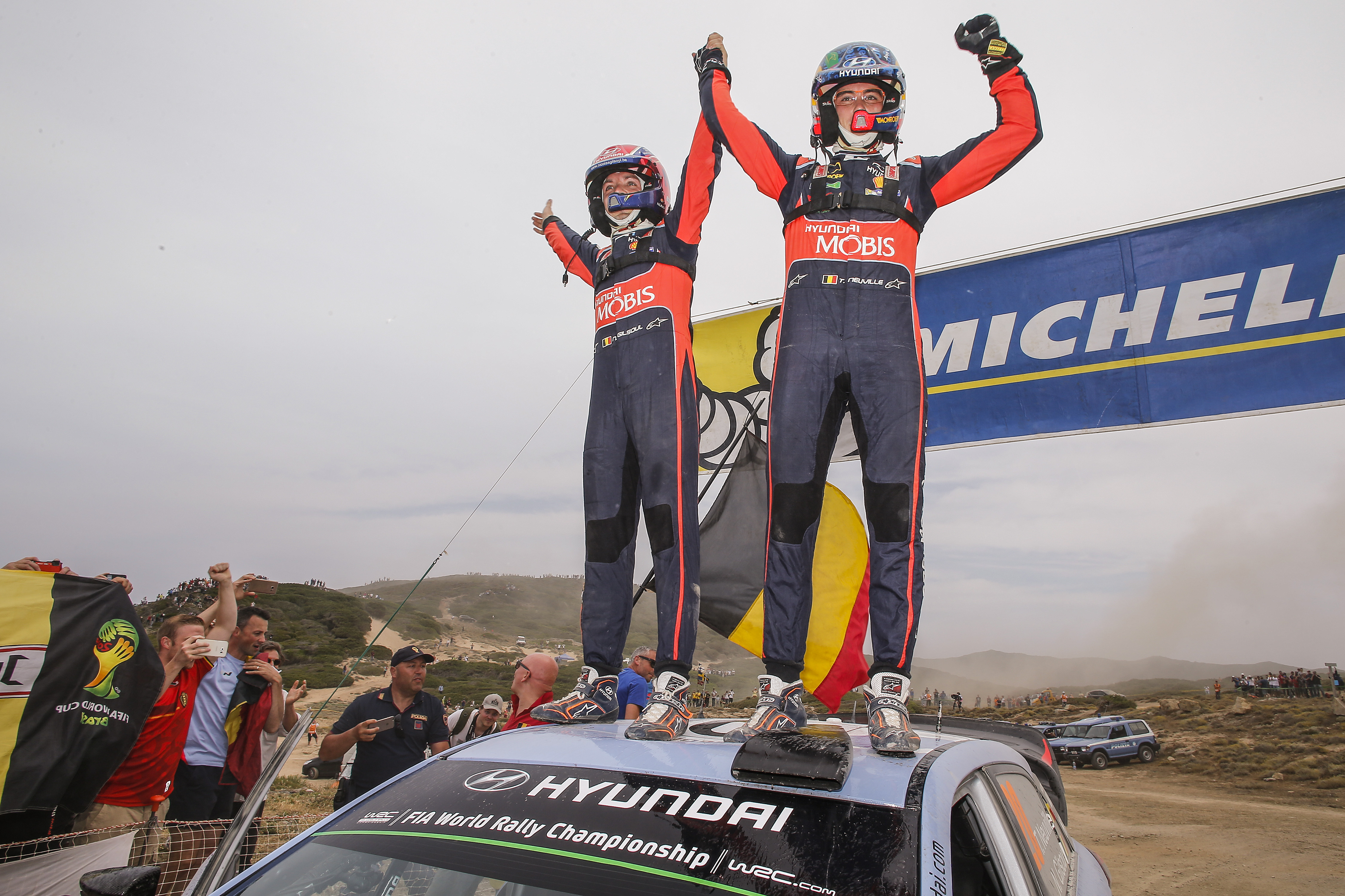
- Rally winners Neuville and Gilsoul after the final stage.
- Host country: Italy
- Rally base: Alghero, Sardinia
- Dates run: June 9 – June 12, 2016
- Stages: 19 (322.82 km; 200.59 miles)
- Stage surface: Gravel
- Overall distance: 1,290.37 km (801.80 miles)

Overall results
- Overall winner: (Belgium) Thierry Neuville (Belgium) Nicolas Gilsoul (Germany) Hyundai Motorsport N

The 2016 Rally di Sardegna (formally the 13º Rally Italia Sardegna) was the sixth round of the 2016 World Rally Championship. The race was held over four days between 9 June and 12 June 2016, and was based in Alghero, Sardinia, Italy. Hyundai's Thierry Neuville won the race, his 2nd win in the World Rally Championship.

== Overall standings ==
Pos.	No.	Driver	Co-driver	Team	Car	Class	Time	Difference	Points
Overall classification
1	20	(Belgium) Thierry Neuville	(Belgium) Nicolas Gilsoul	(Germany) Hyundai Motorsport N	Hyundai i20 WRC	WRC	3:35:25.8		25
2	2	(Finland) Jari-Matti Latvala	(Finland) Miikka Anttila	(Germany) Volkswagen Motorsport	Volkswagen Polo R WRC	WRC	3:35:50.6	+24.8	19
3	1	(France) Sébastien Ogier	(France) Julien Ingrassia	(Germany) Volkswagen Motorsport	Volkswagen Polo R WRC	WRC	3:37:03.6	+1:37.8	18
4	4	(Spain) Dani Sordo	(Spain) Marc Martí	(Germany) Hyundai Motorsport	Hyundai i20 WRC	WRC	3:38:19.8	+2:54.0	12
5	12	(Estonia) Ott Tänak	(Estonia) Raigo Mõlder	(United Kingdom) DMACK World Rally Team	Ford Fiesta RS WRC	WRC	3:40:52.2	+5:26.4	10
6	6	(France) Eric Camilli	(France) Benjamin Veillas	(United Kingdom) M-Sport World Rally Team	Ford Fiesta RS WRC	WRC	3:41:25.6	+5:59.8	8
7	16	(Norway) Henning Solberg	(Austria) Ilka Minor	(Norway) Henning Solberg	Ford Fiesta RS WRC	WRC	3:41:48.0	+6:22.2	6
8	34	(Finland) Teemu Suninen	(Finland) Mikko Markkula	(France) Team Oreca	Škoda Fabia R5	WRC-2	3:44:23.2	+8:57.4	4
9	21	(Czech Republic) Martin Prokop	(Czech Republic) Jan Tománek	(Czech Republic) Jipocar Czech National Team	Ford Fiesta RS WRC	WRC	3:44:28.7	+9:02.9	2
10	43	(Czech Republic) Jan Kopecký	(Czech Republic) Pavel Dresler	(Czech Republic) Škoda Motorsport	Škoda Fabia R5	WRC-2	3:45:12.8	+9:47.0	1
15	10	(Netherlands) Kevin Abbring	(United Kingdom) Sebastian Marshall	(Germany) Hyundai Motorsport N	Hyundai i20 WRC	WRC	3:59:06.4	+23:40.6	2

== Special stages ==
Day	Stage number	Stage name	Length	Stage winner	Car No.	Team	Time	Rally leader
9 Jun	SS1	(Italy) Ittiri Arena Show	2.00 km	(France) Sébastien Ogier (France) Julien Ingrassia	1	(Germany) Volkswagen Motorsport	2:00.4	(France) Sébastien Ogier (France) Julien Ingrassia
10 Jun	SS2	(Italy) Ardara - Ozieri 1	7.50 km	(Finland) Jari-Matti Latvala (Finland) Miikka Anttila	2	(Germany) Volkswagen Motorsport	4:06.4	(Finland) Jari-Matti Latvala (Finland) Miikka Anttila
10 Jun	SS3	(Italy) Tula 1	15.00 km	(France) Sébastien Ogier (France) Julien Ingrassia	1	(Germany) Volkswagen Motorsport	12:05.3	(France) Sébastien Ogier (France) Julien Ingrassia
10 Jun	SS4	(Italy) Castelsardo 1	14.02 km	(Belgium) Thierry Neuville (Belgium) Nicolas Gilsoul	20	(Germany) Hyundai Motorsport N	10:29.0	(Finland) Jari-Matti Latvala (Finland) Miikka Anttila
10 Jun	SS5	(Italy) Tergu - Osilo 1	14.91 km	(Belgium) Thierry Neuville (Belgium) Nicolas Gilsoul	20	(Germany) Hyundai Motorsport N	9:47.3	(Belgium) Thierry Neuville (Belgium) Nicolas Gilsoul
10 Jun	SS6	(Italy) Ardara - Ozieri 2	7.50 km	(Finland) Jari-Matti Latvala (Finland) Miikka Anttila	2	(Germany) Volkswagen Motorsport	4:01.5	(Finland) Jari-Matti Latvala (Finland) Miikka Anttila
10 Jun	SS7	(Italy) Tula 2	15.00 km	(Belgium) Thierry Neuville (Belgium) Nicolas Gilsoul	20	(Germany) Hyundai Motorsport N	11:46.3	(Belgium) Thierry Neuville (Belgium) Nicolas Gilsoul
10 Jun	SS8	(Italy) Castelsardo 2	14.02 km	(Belgium) Thierry Neuville (Belgium) Nicolas Gilsoul	20	(Germany) Hyundai Motorsport N	10:07.7	(Belgium) Thierry Neuville (Belgium) Nicolas Gilsoul
10 Jun	SS9	(Italy) Tergu - Osilo 2	14.91 km	(Belgium) Thierry Neuville (Belgium) Nicolas Gilsoul	20	(Germany) Hyundai Motorsport N	9:31.4	(Belgium) Thierry Neuville (Belgium) Nicolas Gilsoul
11 Jun	SS10	(Italy) Monti di Alà 1	22.20 km	(Netherlands) Kevin Abbring (United Kingdom) Sebastian Marshall	10	(Germany) Hyundai Motorsport N	13:34.6	(Belgium) Thierry Neuville (Belgium) Nicolas Gilsoul
11 Jun	SS11	(Italy) Coiluna - Loelle 1	22.39 km	(Estonia) Ott Tänak (Estonia) Raigo Mõlder	12	(United Kingdom) DMACK World Rally Team	14:12.0	(Belgium) Thierry Neuville (Belgium) Nicolas Gilsoul
11 Jun	SS12	(Italy) Monte Lerno 1	44.26 km	(Norway) Mads Østberg (Norway) Ola Fløene	5	(United Kingdom) M-Sport World Rally Team	29:34.7	(Belgium) Thierry Neuville (Belgium) Nicolas Gilsoul
11 Jun	SS13	(Italy) Monti di Alà 2	22.20 km	(Belgium) Thierry Neuville (Belgium) Nicolas Gilsoul	20	(Germany) Hyundai Motorsport N	13:11.2	(Belgium) Thierry Neuville (Belgium) Nicolas Gilsoul
11 Jun	SS14	(Italy) Coiluna - Loelle 2	22.39 km	(Finland) Jari-Matti Latvala (Finland) Miikka Anttila	2	(Germany) Volkswagen Motorsport	13:56.5	(Belgium) Thierry Neuville (Belgium) Nicolas Gilsoul
11 Jun	SS15	(Italy) Monte Lerno 2	44.26 km	(Belgium) Thierry Neuville (Belgium) Nicolas Gilsoul	20	(Germany) Hyundai Motorsport N	28:47.1	(Belgium) Thierry Neuville (Belgium) Nicolas Gilsoul
12 Jun	SS16	(Italy) Cala Flumini 1	14.06 km	(Belgium) Thierry Neuville (Belgium) Nicolas Gilsoul	20	(Germany) Hyundai Motorsport N	9:08.1	(Belgium) Thierry Neuville (Belgium) Nicolas Gilsoul
12 Jun	SS17	(Italy) Sassari - Argentiera 1	6.07 km	(France) Eric Camilli (France) Benjamin Veillas	6	(United Kingdom) M-Sport World Rally Team	4:57.2	(Belgium) Thierry Neuville (Belgium) Nicolas Gilsoul
12 Jun	SS18	(Italy) Cala Flumini 2	14.06 km	(Belgium) Thierry Neuville (Belgium) Nicolas Gilsoul	20	(Germany) Hyundai Motorsport N	8:53.0	(Belgium) Thierry Neuville (Belgium) Nicolas Gilsoul
12 Jun	SS19	(Italy) Sassari - Argentiera 2 (Power Stage)	6.07 km	(France) Sébastien Ogier (France) Julien Ingrassia	1	(Germany) Volkswagen Motorsport	4:50.1	(Belgium) Thierry Neuville (Belgium) Nicolas Gilsoul
