= 2016 Rally Poland =

Motor rally competition

2016 Rally Poland: 73. PZM Rajd Polski
Round 7 of the 2016 World Rally Championship
| ← Previous event | Next event → |
- Rally base: (Poland) Mikołajki
- Dates run: 30 June – 3 July 2016
- Stages: 21 (306.10 km; 190.20 miles)
- Stage surface: Gravel

Overall results
- Overall winner: (Norway) Andreas Mikkelsen (Norway) Anders Jæger (Germany) Volkswagen Motorsport II

The 2016 Rally Poland (formally the 73. PZM Rajd Polski) was the seventh round of the 2016 World Rally Championship. The event was held over four days between 30 June and 3 July 2016, and was based in Mikołajki, Poland.

Sebastian Ogier and Julien Ingrassia were the defending rally winners having won the event in the previous two seasons. Volkswagen's Andreas Mikkelsen and Anders Jæger won the rally after taking the lead in penultimate stage .It was Mikkelsen's second win in the World Rally Championship.

== Overall standings ==
| Pos. | No. | Driver | Co-driver | Team | Car | Class | Time | Difference | Points |
Overall classification
| 1 | 9 | (Norway) Andreas Mikkelsen | (Norway) Anders Jæger | (Germany) Volkswagen Motorsport II | Volkswagen Polo R WRC | WRC | 2:37:34.4 | | 25 |
| 2 | 12 | (Estonia) Ott Tänak | (Estonia) Raigo Mõlder | (United Kingdom) DMACK World Rally Team | Ford Fiesta RS WRC | WRC | 2:38:00.6 | +26.2 | 18 |
| 3 | 4 | (New Zealand) Hayden Paddon | (New Zealand) John Kennard | (Germany) Hyundai Motorsport | Hyundai i20 WRC | WRC | 2:38:02.9 | +28.5 | 15 |
| 4 | 3 | (Belgium) Thierry Neuville | (Belgium) Nicolas Gilsoul | (Germany) Hyundai Motorsport | Hyundai i20 WRC | WRC | 2:38:03.7 | +29.3 | 13 |
| 5 | 2 | (Finland) Jari-Matti Latvala | (Finland) Miikka Anttila | (Germany) Volkswagen Motorsport | Volkswagen Polo R WRC | WRC | 2:38:08.2 | +33.8 | 12 |
| 6 | 1 | (France) Sébastien Ogier | (France) Julien Ingrassia | (Germany) Volkswagen Motorsport | Volkswagen Polo R WRC | WRC | 2:38:14.7 | +40.3 | 11 |
| 7 | 8 | (Republic of Ireland) Craig Breen | (United Kingdom) Scott Martin | (France) Abu Dhabi Total World Rally Team | Citroën DS3 WRC | WRC | 2:39:35.8 | +2:01.4 | 6 |
| 8 | 5 | (Norway) Mads Østberg | (Norway) Ola Fløene | (United Kingdom) M-Sport World Rally Team | Ford Fiesta RS WRC | WRC | 2:40:39.0 | +3:04.6 | 4 |
| 9 | 7 | (France) Stéphane Lefebvre | (France) Gabin Moreau | (France) Abu Dhabi Total World Rally Team | Citroën DS3 WRC | WRC | 2:42:46.4 | +5:12.0 | 2 |
| 10 | 6 | (France) Eric Camilli | (France) Benjamin Veillas | (United Kingdom) M-Sport World Rally Team | Ford Fiesta RS WRC | WRC | 2:42:57.5 | +5:23.1 | 1 |

== Special stages ==
| Day | Stage | Name | Length | Winner | Car | Time | Rally leader |
|---|---|---|---|---|---|---|---|
| Leg 1 | SS1 | SSS Mikołajki Arena 1 | 2.50 km | (Belgium) Thierry Neuville | Hyundai i20 WRC | 1:46.2 | (Belgium) Thierry Neuville |
| Leg 1 | SS2 | Chmielewo 1 | 6.52 km | (New Zealand) Hayden Paddon | Hyundai i20 WRC | 3:15.9 | (Estonia) Ott Tänak |
| Leg 1 | SS3 | Wieliczki 1 | 17.30 km | (Norway) Andreas Mikkelsen | Volkswagen Polo R WRC | 8:58.6 | (Norway) Andreas Mikkelsen |
| Leg 1 | SS4 | Świętajno 1 | 21.14 km | (Estonia) Ott Tänak | Ford Fiesta RS WRC | 10:04.8 | (Norway) Andreas Mikkelsen |
| Leg 1 | SS5 | Stare Juchy 1 | 13.50 km | (New Zealand) Hayden Paddon | Hyundai i20 WRC | 6:45.3 | (Norway) Andreas Mikkelsen |
| Leg 1 | SS6 | Chmielewo 2 | 6.52 km | (Estonia) Ott Tänak | Ford Fiesta RS WRC | 3:10.7 | (Norway) Andreas Mikkelsen |
| Leg 1 | SS7 | Wieliczki 2 | 17.30 km | (Estonia) Ott Tänak | Ford Fiesta RS WRC | 8:50.2 | (Norway) Andreas Mikkelsen |
| Leg 1 | SS8 | Świętajno 2 | 21.14 km | (Estonia) Ott Tänak | Ford Fiesta RS WRC | 9:54.0 | (Estonia) Ott Tänak |
| Leg 1 | SS9 | Stare Juchy 2 | 13.50 km | (New Zealand) Hayden Paddon | Hyundai i20 WRC | 6:39.1 | (Estonia) Ott Tänak |
| Leg 1 | SS10 | SSS Mikołajki Arena 2 | 2.50 km | (France) Sébastien Ogier (Estonia) Ott Tänak | Volkswagen Polo R WRC; Ford Fiesta WRC | 1:46.0 | (Estonia) Ott Tänak |
| Leg 2 | SS11 | Gołdap 1 | 14.75 km | (Estonia) Ott Tänak | Ford Fiesta RS WRC | 7:26.3 | (Estonia) Ott Tänak |
| Leg 2 | SS12 | Stańczyki 1 | 25.27 km | (Estonia) Ott Tänak | Ford Fiesta RS WRC | 13:40.7 | (Estonia) Ott Tänak |
| Leg 2 | SS13 | Babki 1 | 21.02 km | (Estonia) Ott Tänak | Ford Fiesta RS WRC | 10:16.5 | (Estonia) Ott Tänak |
| Leg 2 | SS14 | Stańczyki 2 | 25.27 km | (Norway) Andreas Mikkelsen | Volkswagen Polo R WRC | 13:27.2 | (Estonia) Ott Tänak |
| Leg 2 | SS15 | Babki 2 | 21.02 km | (France) Stéphane Lefebvre | Citroën DS3 WRC | 10:04.3 | (Estonia) Ott Tänak |
| Leg 2 | SS16 | Gołdap 2 | 14.75 km | (Finland) Jari-Matti Latvala | Volkswagen Polo R WRC | 7:29.5 | (Estonia) Ott Tänak |
| Leg 2 | SS17 | SSS Mikołajki Arena 3 | 2.50 km | (Estonia) Ott Tänak | Ford Fiesta RS WRC | 1:45.4 | (Estonia) Ott Tänak |
| Leg 3 | SS18 | Baranowo 1 | 21.25 km | (Norway) Andreas Mikkelsen | Volkswagen Polo R WRC | 10:43.5 | (Estonia) Ott Tänak |
| Leg 3 | SS19 | Sady 1 | 8.55 km | (France) Sébastien Ogier | Volkswagen Polo R WRC | 4:31.2 | (Estonia) Ott Tänak |
| Leg 3 | SS20 | Baranowo 2 | 21.25 km | (Finland) Jari-Matti Latvala | Volkswagen Polo R WRC | 11:18.5 | (Norway) Andreas Mikkelsen |
| Leg 3 | SS21 | Sady 2 (Power Stage) | 8.55 km | (France) Sébastien Ogier | Volkswagen Polo R WRC | 4:47.0 | (Norway) Andreas Mikkelsen |

=== Power Stage ===
The "Power stage" was a 8.55 km (5.31 mi) stage at the end of the rally.

| Pos | Driver | Co-driver | Car | Time | Diff. | Pts |
|---|---|---|---|---|---|---|
| 1 | (France) Sébastien Ogier | (France) Julien Ingrassia | Volkswagen Polo R WRC | 4:47.0 | 0.0 | 3 |
| 2 | (Finland) Jari-Matti Latvala | (Finland) Miikka Anttila | Volkswagen Polo R WRC | 4:47.7 | +0.7 | 2 |
| 3 | (Belgium) Thierry Neuville | (Belgium) Nicolas Gilsoul | Hyundai i20 WRC | 4:48.5 | +1.5 | 1 |
