= 2016 Rally Finland =

Motor rally competition

Rally Finland 2016: 66. Neste Rally Finland
Round 8 of the 2016 World Rally Championship season
← Previous event	Next event →
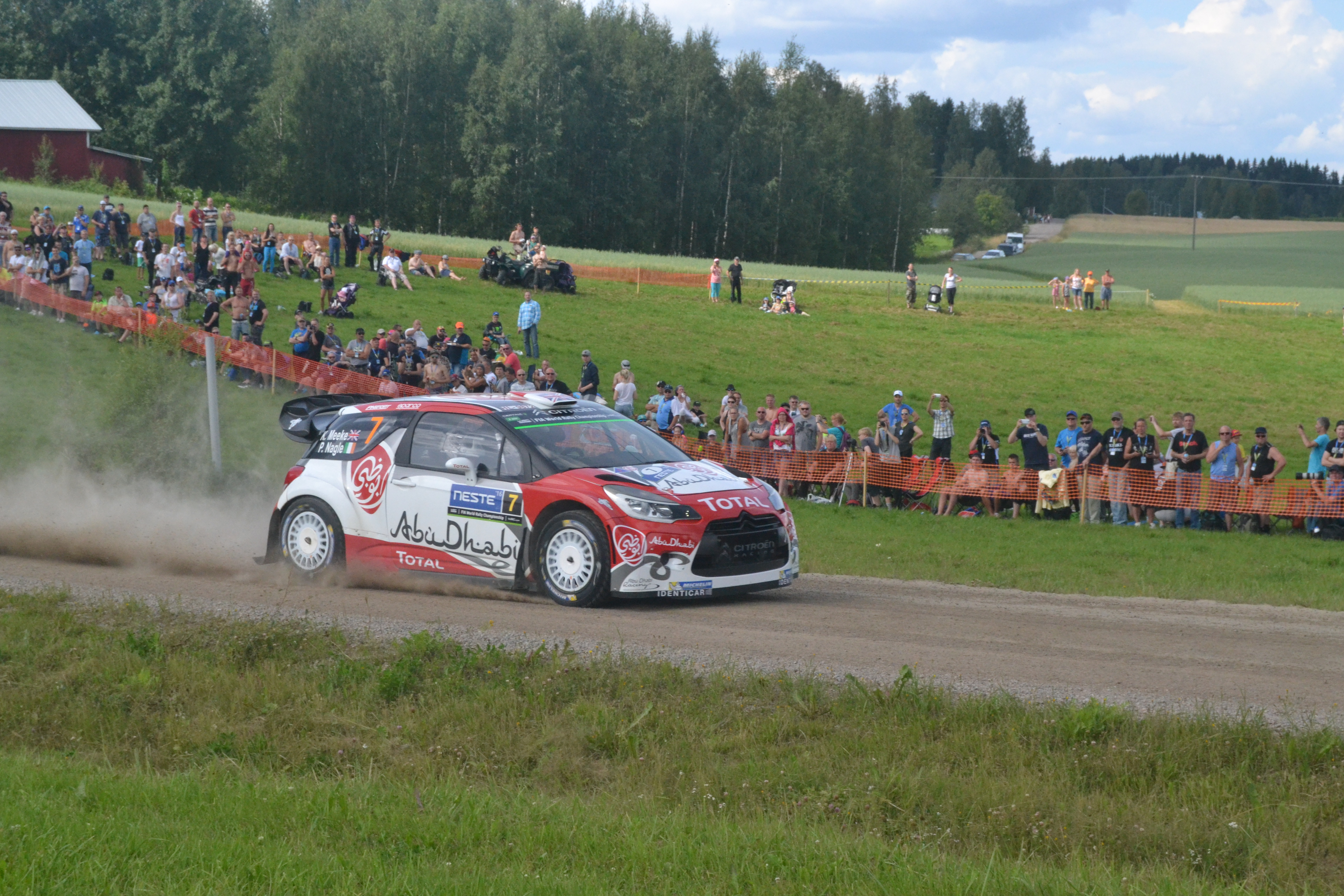
- Kris Meeke in stage 7
- Host country: Finland
- Dates run: July 28 – July 31, 2016
- Stages: 24 (333.99 km; 207.53 miles)
- Stage surface: Gravel
- Overall distance: 1,370.66 km (851.69 miles)

The 2016 Rally Finland (formally known as the 66. Neste Rally Finland) was the eighth round of the 2016 World Rally Championship season, an auto racing event for rally cars. It was held over twenty-four stages based in and around Jyväskylä in central Finland from 28 July to 31 July 2016, with competitors covering 333.99 km (207.53 mi) of competitive kilometres. It was won by Northern Irishman Kris Meeke, his second win of the season. Meeke established a new record for the fastest FIA WRC round in history - the 126.60 km/h average speed beat the previous record by 1.2 km/h.

== Entry list ==
Number	Driver	Co-Driver	Team	Car
#1	Sébastien Ogier	Julien Ingrassia	Volkswagen Motorsport	Volkswagen Polo R WRC
#2	Jari-Matti Latvala	Miikka Anttila	Volkswagen Motorsport	Volkswagen Polo R WRC
#3	Thierry Neuville	Nicolas Gilsoul	Hyundai Motorsport	Hyundai NG i20 WRC
#4	Hayden Paddon	John Kennard	Hyundai Motorsport	Hyundai NG i20 WRC
#5	Mads Østberg	Ola Fløene	M-Sport World Rally Team	Ford Fiesta RS WRC
#6	Eric Camilli	Benjamin Veillas	M-Sport World Rally Team	Ford Fiesta RS WRC
#7	Kris Meeke	Paul Nagle	Abu Dhabi Total WRT	Citroën DS3 WRC
#8	Craig Breen	Scott Martin	Abu Dhabi Total WRT	Citroën DS3 WRC
#9	Andreas Mikkelsen	Anders Jæger	Volkswagen Motorsport II	Volkswagen Polo R WRC
#12	Ott Tänak	Raigo Mõlder	DMACK World Rally Team	Ford Fiesta RS WRC
#14	Khalid Al-Qassimi	Chris Patterson	Abu Dhabi Total WRT	Citroën DS3 WRC
#15	Marcos Ligato	Ruben Garcia	Marcos Ligato	Citroën DS3 WRC
#20	Kevin Abbring	Sebastian Marshall	Hyundai Motorsport N	Hyundai NG i20 WRC
#22	Valeriy Gorban	Volodymyr Korsia	Eurolamp WRT	Mini John Cooper Works WRC
#30	Yazeed Al-Rajhi	Michael Orr	Yazeed Racing	Ford Fiesta RS WRC
#31	Elfyn Evans	Craig Parry	M-Sport World Rally Team	Ford Fiesta R5
#32	Teemu Suninen	Mikko Markkula	Team Oreca	Škoda Fabia R5
#33	Pontus Tidemand	Jonas Andersson	Škoda Motorsport	Škoda Fabia R5
#34	Marius Aasen	Veronica Gulbæk Engan	Drive DMACK Trophy Team	Ford Fiesta R5
#35	Esapekka Lappi	Janne Ferm	Škoda Motorsport	Škoda Fabia R5
#36	Quentin Gilbert	Renaud Jamoul	Quentin Gilbert	Citroën DS3 R5
#37	Lorenzo Bertelli	Simone Scattolin	FWRT s.r.l.	Ford Fiesta RS WRC
#38	Yoann Bonato	Denis Giraudet	Yoann Bonato	Citroën DS3 R5
#39	Karl Kruuda	Martin Järveoja	Drive DMACK Trophy Team	Ford Fiesta R5
#41	Scott Pedder	Dale Moscatt	Scott Pedder	Škoda Fabia R5
#43	Pierre-Louis Loubet	Vincent Landais	Pierre-Louis Loubet	Citroën DS3 R5
#44	Emil Bergkvist	Joakim Sjöberg	Emil Bergkvist	Citroën DS3 R5
#45	Radik Shaymiev	Maxim Tsvetkov	TAIF Motorsport	Ford Fiesta R5
#46	Henning Solberg	Ilka Minor-Petrasko	M-Sport World Rally Team	Ford Fiesta R5
#47	Hiroki Arai	Glenn Macneall	Tommi Mäkinen Racing	Ford Fiesta R5
#49	Joonas Soilu	Tuomo Hannonen	TGS Worldwide OU	Škoda Fabia S2000
#50	Takamoto Katsuta	Daniel Barritt	Tommi Mäkinen Racing	Ford Fiesta R5
#51	Janne Tuohino	Markku Tuohino	Toksport WRT	Ford Fiesta R5
#52	Hubert Ptaszek	Maciej Szczepaniak	The Ptock	Škoda Fabia R5
#61	Fabio Andolfi	Manuel Fenoli	ACI Team Italia	Peugeot 208 R2
#62	Damiano De Tommaso	Paolo Rocca	ACI Team Italia	Peugeot 208 R2
#63	Ole Christian Veiby	Rune Stig Skjærmoen	Printsport Oy	Citroën DS3 R3T Max
#64	Martin Koči	Lukáš Kostka	Styllex Slovak National Team	Citroën DS3 R3T Max
#65	Simone Tempestini	Giovanni Bernacchini	Simone Tempestini	Citroën DS3 R3T Max
#66	Vincent Dubert	Alexandre Coria	Vincent Dubert	Citroën DS3 R3T Max
#67	Terry Folb	Franck Floch Le	Sébastien Loeb Racing	Citroën DS3 R3T Max
#69	Juuso Nordgren	Mikael Korhonen	Juuso Nordgren	Citroën DS3 R3T Max
#70	Romain Martel	Vanessa Lemoine	Romain Martel	Citroën DS3 R3T Max
#71	Mohamed Al-Mutawaa	Stephen McAuley	Abu Dhabi Racing Team	Citroën DS3 R3T Max
#72	Andrea Crugnola	Michele Ferrara	Andrea Crugnola	Citroën DS3 R3T Max
#81	Oleksiy Tamrazov	Nicola Arena	Oleksiy Tamrazov	Ford Fiesta RS WRC
#82	Abdullah Al-Qassimi	Steve Lancaster	Abdullah Al-Qassimi	Ford Fiesta RS WRC
#83	José Alberto Nicolas	Leonardo Suaya	José Alberto Nicolas	Citroën DS3 WRC
#84	Matti Koskelo	Rami Suorsa	Matti Koskelo	Ford Fiesta RS WRC
#85	Juha Salo	Marko Salminen	Juha Salo	Peugeot 208 T16
#86	Jukka Kasi	Henri Ania	Jukka Kasi	Ford Fiesta S2000
#87	Antti Selivaara	Antti Linnaketo	Antti Selivaara	Subaru Impreza WRX STi
#88	Jouni Virtanen	Noora Saarinen	Jouni Virtanen	Ford Fiesta S2000
#89	Lars Stugemo	Kalle Lexe	Lars Stugemo	Ford Fiesta R5
#90	Jukka Metsälä	Sari Ohra-Aho	Jukka Metsälä	Škoda Fabia R5
#91	Kari Hytönen	Ada Herranen	Kari Hytönen	Škoda Fabia R5
#92	Jari Kuikka	Kimmo Halttunen	Jari Kuikka	Subaru Impreza STi
#93	Mohammed Al-Qassimi	Joseph Matar	Mohammed Al-Qassimi	Mitsubishi Lancer Evo IX
#94	Taisko Lario	Sami Ryynänen	Taisko Lario	Peugeot 208 R2
#95	Miika Hokkanen	Teemu Horkama	Miika Hokkanen	Ford Fiesta R2T
#96	Eerik Pietarinen	Juha-Pekka Jauhiainen	Eerik Pietarinen	Ford Fiesta R2T
#97	Jari Kihlman	Tomi Ikonen	Jari Kihlman	Ford Fiesta R2
#98	Jani Seppälä	Pasi Lahtinen	Jani Seppälä	Ford Fiesta R1
#99	Louise Cook	Stefan Davis	Louise Cook	Ford Fiesta R2
#100	Raimo Kaisanlahti	Jussi Kumpumäki	Raimo Kaisanlahti	Ford Fiesta R2
#101	Bernardo Sousa	Hugo Magalhães	Bernardo Sousa	Ford Fiesta R2T
#102	Max Vatanen	Maxime Vilmot	Max Vatanen	Ford Fiesta R2T
#103	Osian Pryce	Dale Furniss	Osian Pryce	Ford Fiesta R2T
#104	Gus Greensmith	Alessandro Gelsomino	Gus Greensmith	Ford Fiesta R2T
#106	Jon Armstrong	Noel O'Sullivan	Jon Armstrong	Ford Fiesta R2T
#107	Jakub Brzeziński	Jakub Gerber	Jakub Brzeziński	Ford Fiesta R2T
#109	Oscar Solberg	Patrik Barth	Oscar Solberg	Ford Fiesta R2T
#111	Nicolas Ciamin	Thibault de la Haye	Nicolas Ciamin	Ford Fiesta R2T
#112	Karan Patel	Phil Hall	Karan Patel	Ford Fiesta R2T
#113	Sami Juusonen	Jan Talso	Sami Juusonen	Suzuki Swift Sport
#114	Kohei Izuno	Osamu Yoda	Kohei Izuno	Toyota Vitz

Source: https://www.ewrc-results.com/entries/27496-neste-rally-finland-2016/

== Special stages ==
Day	Stage number	Stage name	Length	Stage winner	Car No.	Team	Time	Rally leader
28 Jul	SS1	(Finland) Harju 1	2.31 km	(Estonia) Ott Tänak (Estonia) Raigo Mölder	12	(United Kingdom) DMACK World Rally Team	1:45.9	(Estonia) Ott Tänak (Estonia) Raigo Mölder / (Norway) Andreas Mikkelsen (Norway) Anders Jaeger
28 Jul	SS1	(Finland) Harju 1	2.31 km	(Norway) Andreas Mikkelsen (Norway) Anders Jaeger	9	(Germany) Volkswagen Motorsport II	1:45.9	(Estonia) Ott Tänak (Estonia) Raigo Mölder / (Norway) Andreas Mikkelsen (Norway) Anders Jaeger
29 Jul	SS2	(Finland) Mökkiperä 1	13.84 km	(United Kingdom) Kris Meeke (Republic of Ireland) Paul Nagle	7	(France) Citroën Abu Dhabi Total World Rally Team	6:43.4	(United Kingdom) Kris Meeke (Republic of Ireland) Paul Nagle
29 Jul	SS3	(Finland) Halinen	7.07 km	(Finland) Jari-Matti Latvala (Finland) Miikka Anttila	2	(Germany) Volkswagen Motorsport	3:25.8	(United Kingdom) Kris Meeke (Republic of Ireland) Paul Nagle
29 Jul	SS4	(Finland) Jukojärvi 1	21.24 km	(Estonia) Ott Tänak (Estonia) Raigo Mölder	12	(United Kingdom) DMACK World Rally Team	9:59.9	(United Kingdom) Kris Meeke (Republic of Ireland) Paul Nagle
29 Jul	SS5	(Finland) Surkee 1	14.95 km	(United Kingdom) Kris Meeke (Republic of Ireland) Paul Nagle	7	(France) Citroën Abu Dhabi Total World Rally Team	7:54.8	(United Kingdom) Kris Meeke (Republic of Ireland) Paul Nagle
29 Jul	SS6	(Finland) Horkka 1	15.01 km	(Finland) Jari-Matti Latvala (Finland) Miikka Anttila	2	(Germany) Volkswagen Motorsport	7:01.0	(United Kingdom) Kris Meeke (Republic of Ireland) Paul Nagle
29 Jul	SS7	(Finland) Äänekoski-Valtra	7.39 km	(Estonia) Ott Tänak (Estonia) Raigo Mölder	12	(United Kingdom) DMACK World Rally Team	3:24.5	(United Kingdom) Kris Meeke (Republic of Ireland) Paul Nagle
29 Jul	SS8	(Finland) Mökkiperä 2	13.84 km	(United Kingdom) Kris Meeke (Republic of Ireland) Paul Nagle	7	(France) Citroën Abu Dhabi Total World Rally Team	6:38.2	(United Kingdom) Kris Meeke (Republic of Ireland) Paul Nagle
29 Jul	SS9	(Finland) Jukojärvi 2	21.24 km	(Estonia) Ott Tänak (Estonia) Raigo Mölder	12	(United Kingdom) DMACK World Rally Team	9:47.2	(United Kingdom) Kris Meeke (Republic of Ireland) Paul Nagle
29 Jul	SS10	(Finland) Surkee 2	14.95 km	(Finland) Jari-Matti Latvala (Finland) Miikka Anttila	2	(Germany) Volkswagen Motorsport	7:47.3	(United Kingdom) Kris Meeke (Republic of Ireland) Paul Nagle
29 Jul	SS11	(Finland) Horkka 2	15.01 km	(United Kingdom) Kris Meeke (Republic of Ireland) Paul Nagle	7	(France) Citroën Abu Dhabi Total World Rally Team	6:54.3	(United Kingdom) Kris Meeke (Republic of Ireland) Paul Nagle
29 Jul	SS12	(Finland) Harju 2	2.31 km	(Norway) Andreas Mikkelsen (Norway) Anders Jaeger	9	(Germany) Volkswagen Motorsport II	1:44.6	(United Kingdom) Kris Meeke (Republic of Ireland) Paul Nagle
30 Jul	SS13	(Finland) Ouninpohja 1	33.00 km	(United Kingdom) Kris Meeke (Republic of Ireland) Paul Nagle	7	(France) Citroën Abu Dhabi Total World Rally Team	15:06.3	(United Kingdom) Kris Meeke (Republic of Ireland) Paul Nagle
30 Jul	SS14	(Finland) Päijälä 1	23.50 km	(Estonia) Ott Tänak (Estonia) Raigo Mölder	12	(United Kingdom) DMACK World Rally Team	10:48.0	(United Kingdom) Kris Meeke (Republic of Ireland) Paul Nagle
30 Jul	SS15	(Finland) Pihlajakosku 1	14.51 km	(United Kingdom) Kris Meeke (Republic of Ireland) Paul Nagle	7	(France) Citroën Abu Dhabi Total World Rally Team	6:35.6	(United Kingdom) Kris Meeke (Republic of Ireland) Paul Nagle
30 Jul	SS16	(Finland) Saalahti 1	4.23 km	(Norway) Mads Østberg (Norway) Ola Fløene	5	(United Kingdom) M-Sport World Rally Team	2:02.8	(United Kingdom) Kris Meeke (Republic of Ireland) Paul Nagle
30 Jul	SS16	(Finland) Saalahti 1	4.23 km	(France) Sébastien Ogier (France) Julien Ingrassia	1	(Germany) Volkswagen Motorsport	2:02.8	(United Kingdom) Kris Meeke (Republic of Ireland) Paul Nagle
30 Jul	SS17	(Finland) Ouninpohja 2	33.00 km	(United Kingdom) Kris Meeke (Republic of Ireland) Paul Nagle	7	(France) Citroën Abu Dhabi Total World Rally Team	14:56.5	(United Kingdom) Kris Meeke (Republic of Ireland) Paul Nagle
30 Jul	SS18	(Finland) Päijälä 2	23.50 km	(United Kingdom) Kris Meeke (Republic of Ireland) Paul Nagle	7	(France) Citroën Abu Dhabi Total World Rally Team	10:36.5	(United Kingdom) Kris Meeke (Republic of Ireland) Paul Nagle
30 Jul	SS19	(Finland) Pihlajakoski 2	14.51 km	(France) Sébastien Ogier (France) Julien Ingrassia	1	(Germany) Volkswagen Motorsport	6:28.0	(United Kingdom) Kris Meeke (Republic of Ireland) Paul Nagle
30 Jul	SS20	(Finland) Saalahti 2	4.23 km	(France) Sébastien Ogier (France) Julien Ingrassia	1	(Germany) Volkswagen Motorsport	1:59.3	(United Kingdom) Kris Meeke (Republic of Ireland) Paul Nagle
31 Jul	SS21	(Finland) Lempää 1	6.83 km	(Estonia) Ott Tänak (Estonia) Raigo Mölder	12	(United Kingdom) DMACK World Rally Team	3:13.7	(United Kingdom) Kris Meeke (Republic of Ireland) Paul Nagle
31 Jul	SS22	(Finland) Oittila 1	10.15 km	(Belgium) Thierry Neuville (Belgium) Nicolas Gilsoul	3	(Germany) Hyundai Motorsport	4:44.7	(United Kingdom) Kris Meeke (Republic of Ireland) Paul Nagle
31 Jul	SS23	(Finland) Lempää 2	6.83 km	(Republic of Ireland) Craig Breen (United Kingdom) Scott Martin	8	(France) Citroën Abu Dhabi Total World Rally Team	3:11.2	(United Kingdom) Kris Meeke (Republic of Ireland) Paul Nagle
31 Jul	SS24	(Finland) Oitila 2 (Power Stage)	10.15 km	(Belgium) Thierry Neuville (Belgium) Nicolas Gilsoul	3	(Germany) Hyundai Motorsport	4:35.8	(United Kingdom) Kris Meeke (Republic of Ireland) Paul Nagle

=== Power Stage ===
The "Power stage" was a 10.15 km (6.31 mi) stage at the end of the rally.

Pos	Driver	Car	Time	Diff.	Pts
1	(Belgium) Thierry Neuville	Hyundai i20 WRC	4:35.8	0.0	3
2	(New Zealand) Hayden Paddon	Hyundai i20 WRC	4:36.9	+1.1	2
3	(Finland) Jari-Matti Latvala	Volkswagen Polo R WRC	4:37.3	+1.5	1
