= 2016 Rally Australia =

Motor rally competition

2016 Rally Australia: 25. Kennards Hire Rally Australia 2016
Round 13 of the 2016 World Rally Championship
← Previous event
- Rally base: (Australia) Coffs Harbour
- Dates run: 17 – 20 November 2016
- Stages: 23 (283.36 km; 176.07 miles)
- Stage surface: Gravel

Overall results
- Overall winner: (Norway) Andreas Mikkelsen (Norway) Anders Jæger (Germany) Volkswagen Motorsport II

The 2016 Rally Australia (formally the 25. Kennards Hire Rally Australia 2016) was the thirteenth and final round of the 2016 World Rally Championship. The race was held over four days between 17 November and 20 November 2016, and was based in Coffs Harbour, New South Wales, Australia. Volkswagen's Andreas Mikkelsen won the race, his third win in the World Rally Championship.

== Overall standings ==
Pos.	No.	Driver	Co-driver	Team	Car	Class	Time	Difference	Points
Overall classification
1	9	(Norway) Andreas Mikkelsen	(Norway) Anders Jæger	(Germany) Volkswagen Motorsport II	Volkswagen Polo R WRC	WRC	2:46:05.7		25
2	1	(France) Sébastien Ogier	(France) Julien Ingrassia	(Germany) Volkswagen Motorsport	Volkswagen Polo R WRC	WRC	2:46:20.6	+14.9	21
3	3	(Belgium) Thierry Neuville	(Belgium) Nicolas Gilsoul	(Germany) Hyundai Motorsport	Hyundai i20 WRC	WRC	2:47:18.3	+1:12.6	17
4	4	(New Zealand) Hayden Paddon	(New Zealand) John Kennard	(Germany) Hyundai Motorsport	Hyundai i20 WRC	WRC	2:47:32.4	+1:26.7	12
5	20	(Spain) Dani Sordo	(Spain) Marc Martí	(Germany) Hyundai Motorsport N	Hyundai i20 WRC	WRC	2:47:34.0	+1:28.3	11
6	5	(Norway) Mads Østberg	(Norway) Ola Fløene	(United Kingdom) M-Sport World Rally Team	Ford Fiesta RS WRC	WRC	2:47:47.2	+1:41.5	8
7	12	(Estonia) Ott Tänak	(Estonia) Raigo Mõlder	(United Kingdom) DMACK World Rally Team	Ford Fiesta RS WRC	WRC	2:49:10.0	+3:04.3	6
8	31	(Finland) Esapekka Lappi	(Finland) Janne Ferm	(Czech Republic) Škoda Motorsport	Škoda Fabia R5	WRC-2	2:53:38.0	+7:32.3	4
9	2	(Finland) Jari-Matti Latvala	(Finland) Miikka Anttila	(Germany) Volkswagen Motorsport	Volkswagen Polo R WRC	WRC	2:54:02.6	+7:56.9	2
10	37	(Italy) Lorenzo Bertelli	(Italy) Simone Scattolin	(Italy) FWRT s.r.l.	Ford Fiesta RS WRC	WRC	2:54:05.8	+8:00.1	1

== Special stages ==
Day	Stage	Name	Length	Winner	Car	Time	Rally leader
Leg 1	SS1	Utungun 1	7.88 km	(Norway) Andreas Mikkelsen	Volkswagen Polo R WRC	4:55.9	(Norway) Andreas Mikkelsen
Leg 1	SS2	Bakers Creek 1	16.75 km	(New Zealand) Hayden Paddon	Hyundai i20 WRC	10:05.5	(New Zealand) Hayden Paddon
Leg 1	SS3	Northbank 1	8.42 km	(Norway) Andreas Mikkelsen	Volkswagen Polo R WRC	5:49.3	(Norway) Andreas Mikkelsen
Leg 1	SS4	Newry16 1	10.49 km	(Norway) Andreas Mikkelsen	Volkswagen Polo R WRC	6:22.6	(Norway) Andreas Mikkelsen
Leg 1	SS5	Raceway SSS 1	1.37 km	(Belgium) Thierry Neuville (Norway) Andreas Mikkelsen	Hyundai i20 WRC; Volkswagen Polo R WRC	1:17.6	(Norway) Andreas Mikkelsen
Leg 1	SS6	Utungun 2	7.88 km	(Norway) Andreas Mikkelsen	Volkswagen Polo R WRC	4:50.5	(Norway) Andreas Mikkelsen
Leg 1	SS7	Bakers Creek 2	16.75 km	(Belgium) Thierry Neuville	Hyundai i20 WRC	9:48.8	(Norway) Andreas Mikkelsen
Leg 1	SS8	Northbank 2	8.42 km	(France) Sébastien Ogier	Volkswagen Polo R WRC	5:37.5	(Norway) Andreas Mikkelsen
Leg 1	SS9	Newry16 2	10.49 km	(France) Sébastien Ogier	Volkswagen Polo R WRC	6:13.8	(Norway) Andreas Mikkelsen
Leg 1	SS10	Coffs SSS 1	1.27 km	(France) Sébastien Ogier	Volkswagen Polo R WRC	1:02.4	(Norway) Andreas Mikkelsen
Leg 1	SS11	Coffs SSS 2	1.27 km	(France) Sébastien Ogier	Volkswagen Polo R WRC	1:02.0	(Norway) Andreas Mikkelsen
Leg 2	SS12	Nambucca 1	50.80 km	(New Zealand) Hayden Paddon	Hyundai i20 WRC	28:38.6	(Norway) Andreas Mikkelsen
Leg 2	SS13	Valla16 1	14.84 km	(Finland) Jari-Matti Latvala	Volkswagen Polo R WRC	8:37.1	(Norway) Andreas Mikkelsen
Leg 2	SS14	Raceway SSS 2	1.37 km	(France) Sébastien Ogier (Norway) Andreas Mikkelsen (Spain) Dani Sordo	Volkswagen Polo R WRC; Volkswagen Polo R WRC; Hyundai i20 WRC	1:16.8	(Norway) Andreas Mikkelsen
Leg 2	SS15	Nambucca 2	50.80 km	(Finland) Jari-Matti Latvala	Volkswagen Polo R WRC	28:07.0	(Norway) Andreas Mikkelsen
Leg 2	SS16	Valla16 2	14.84 km	(Belgium) Thierry Neuville	Hyundai i20 WRC	8:31.5	(Norway) Andreas Mikkelsen
Leg 2	SS17	Coffs SSS 3	1.27 km	(France) Sébastien Ogier	Volkswagen Polo R WRC	1:01.7	(Norway) Andreas Mikkelsen
Leg 2	SS18	Coffs SSS 4	1.27 km	(Norway) Andreas Mikkelsen	Volkswagen Polo R WRC	1:01.3	(Norway) Andreas Mikkelsen
Leg 3	SS19	Settles Reverse 1	6.20 km	(Norway) Andreas Mikkelsen	Volkswagen Polo R WRC	3:06.5	(Norway) Andreas Mikkelsen
Leg 3	SS20	Bucca16	31.90 km	(Norway) Andreas Mikkelsen	Volkswagen Polo R WRC	17:22.5	(Norway) Andreas Mikkelsen
Leg 3	SS21	Wedding Bells16 1	6.44 km	(Norway) Andreas Mikkelsen	Volkswagen Polo R WRC	3:40.8	(Norway) Andreas Mikkelsen
Leg 3	SS22	Settles Reverse 2	6.20 km	(France) Sébastien Ogier	Volkswagen Polo R WRC	3:05.1	(Norway) Andreas Mikkelsen
Leg 3	SS23	Wedding Bells16 2 (Power Stage)	6.44 km	(France) Sébastien Ogier	Volkswagen Polo R WRC	3:36.8	(Norway) Andreas Mikkelsen

=== Power Stage ===
The "Power stage" was a 6.44 km (4.00 mi) stage at the end of the rally.

Pos	Driver	Car	Time	Diff.	Pts
1	(France) Sébastien Ogier	Volkswagen Polo R WRC	3:36.8	0.0	3
2	(Belgium) Thierry Neuville	Hyundai i20 WRC	3:38.0	+1.2	2
3	(Spain) Dani Sordo	Hyundai i20 WRC	3:39.5	+2.7	1
