= 2016 Rally Argentina =

Fourth round of the 2016 World Rally Championship, held in Córdoba, Argentina

2016 Rally Argentina 36° YPF Rally Argentina
Round 4 of the 2016 World Rally Championship
← Previous event	Next event →
- Rally base: (Argentina) Córdoba
- Dates run: 21 – 24 April 2016
- Stages: 18 (364.68 km; 226.60 miles)
- Stage surface: Gravel

Overall results
- Overall winner: (New Zealand) Hayden Paddon (New Zealand) John Kennard (Germany) Hyundai Motorsport N

The 2016 Rally Argentina (formally the 36° YPF Rally Argentina) was the fourth round of the 2016 World Rally Championship. The race was held over four days between 21 April and 24 April 2016, and operated out of Córdoba, Argentina. Hyundai's Hayden Paddon won the race, his first win in the World Rally Championship.

== Overall standings ==
Pos.	No.	Driver	Co-driver	Team	Car	Class	Time	Difference	Points
Overall classification
1	20	(New Zealand) Hayden Paddon	(New Zealand) John Kennard	(Germany) Hyundai Motorsport N	Hyundai i20 WRC	WRC	3:40:52.9		28
2	1	(France) Sébastien Ogier	(France) Julien Ingrassia	(Germany) Volkswagen Motorsport	Volkswagen Polo R WRC	WRC	3:41:07.2	+14.3	19
3	9	(Norway) Andreas Mikkelsen	(Norway) Anders Jæger	(Germany) Volkswagen Motorsport II	Volkswagen Polo R WRC	WRC	3:41:58.1	+1:05.2	15
4	4	(Spain) Dani Sordo	(Spain) Marc Martí	(Germany) Hyundai Motorsport	Hyundai i20 WRC	WRC	3:42:10.0	+1:17.1	14
5	5	(Norway) Mads Østberg	(Norway) Ola Fløene	(United Kingdom) M-Sport World Rally Team	Ford Fiesta RS WRC	WRC	3:45:49.6	+4:56.7	10
6	3	(Belgium) Thierry Neuville	(Belgium) Nicolas Gilsoul	(Germany) Hyundai Motorsport	Hyundai i20 WRC	WRC	3:50:22.4	+9:29.5	8
7	81	(Argentina) Marcos Ligato	(Argentina) Ruben Garcia	(Argentina) Marcos Ligato	Citroën DS3 WRC	WRC	3:50:32.1	+9:39.2	6
8	6	(France) Eric Camilli	(France) Benjamin Veillas	(United Kingdom) M-Sport World Rally Team	Ford Fiesta RS WRC	WRC	3:51:08.9	+10:16.0	4
9	16	(Norway) Henning Solberg	(Austria) Ilka Minor	(Norway) Henning Solberg	Ford Fiesta RS WRC	WRC	3:51:41.4	+10:48.5	2
10	42	(Peru) Nicolás Fuchs	(Argentina) Fernando Mussano	(Peru) Nicolás Fuchs	Škoda Fabia R5	WRC-2	4:05:35.7	+24:42.8	1

== Special stages ==
Day	Stage	Name	Length	Winner	Car	Time	Rally leader
Leg 1	SS1	Super Especial Cordoba	1.50 km	(France) Sébastien Ogier (Spain) Dani Sordo	Volkswagen Polo R WRC; Hyundai i20 WRC	1:29.0	(France) Sébastien Ogier (Spain) Dani Sordo
Leg 1	SS2	Soconcho - Villa del Dique 1	24.71 km	(France) Sébastien Ogier	Volkswagen Polo R WRC	13:00.1	(France) Sébastien Ogier
Leg 1	SS3	Amboy - Santa Monica 1	20.44 km	(Finland) Jari-Matti Latvala	Volkswagen Polo R WRC	10:36.5	(France) Sébastien Ogier
Leg 1	SS4	Santa Rosa - San Agustin 1	23.85 km	(Finland) Jari-Matti Latvala	Volkswagen Polo R WRC	13:58.3	(Finland) Jari-Matti Latvala
Leg 1	SS5	Super Especial Parque Tematico 1	6.04 km	(Belgium) Thierry Neuville	Hyundai i20 WRC	4:55.9	(Finland) Jari-Matti Latvala
Leg 1	SS6	Soconcho - Villa del Dique 2	24.71 km	(New Zealand) Hayden Paddon	Hyundai i20 WRC	12:54.6	(Finland) Jari-Matti Latvala
Leg 1	SS7	Amboy - Santa Monica 2	20.44 km	(Finland) Jari-Matti Latvala	Volkswagen Polo R WRC	10:33.7	(Finland) Jari-Matti Latvala
Leg 1	SS8	Santa Rosa - San Agustin 2	23.85 km	(Finland) Jari-Matti Latvala	Volkswagen Polo R WRC	13:56.4	(Finland) Jari-Matti Latvala
Leg 1	SS9	Super Especial Parque Tematico 2	6.04 km	(France) Sébastien Ogier	Volkswagen Polo R WRC	4:55.3	(Finland) Jari-Matti Latvala
Leg 2	SS10	Villa Bustos - Tanti 1	19.71 km	(New Zealand) Hayden Paddon	Hyundai i20 WRC	9:58.3	(Finland) Jari-Matti Latvala
Leg 2	SS11	Los Gigantes - Cantere el Condor 1	38.68 km	(New Zealand) Hayden Paddon	Hyundai i20 WRC	20:34.9	(Finland) Jari-Matti Latvala
Leg 2	SS12	Boca del Arroyo - Bajo del Pungo 1	20.52 km	(Finland) Jari-Matti Latvala	Volkswagen Polo R WRC	13:32.9	(Finland) Jari-Matti Latvala
Leg 2	SS13	Villa Bustos - Tanti 2	19.71 km	(Finland) Jari-Matti Latvala	Volkswagen Polo R WRC	9:55.0	(Finland) Jari-Matti Latvala
Leg 2	SS14	Los Gigantes - Cantere el Condor 2	38.68 km	(New Zealand) Hayden Paddon	Hyundai i20 WRC	20:21.2	(New Zealand) Hayden Paddon
Leg 2	SS15	Boca del Arroyo - Bajo del Pungo 2	20.52 km	(Norway) Andreas Mikkelsen	Volkswagen Polo R WRC	13:27.1	(New Zealand) Hayden Paddon
Leg 3	SS16	El Condor - Copina 1	16.32 km	(Estonia) Ott Tänak	Ford Fiesta RS WRC	13:50.6	(New Zealand) Hayden Paddon
Leg 3	SS17	Mina Clavero - Giulio Cesare	22.64 km	(France) Sébastien Ogier	Volkswagen Polo R WRC	18:38.5	(New Zealand) Hayden Paddon
Leg 3	SS18	El Condor - Copina 2 (Power Stage)	16.32 km	(New Zealand) Hayden Paddon	Hyundai i20 WRC	13:08.0	(New Zealand) Hayden Paddon

=== Power Stage ===
The "Power stage" was a 16.32 km (10.14 mi) stage at the end of the rally.

Pos	Driver	Car	Time	Diff.	Pts
1	(New Zealand) Hayden Paddon	Hyundai i20 WRC	13:08.0	0.0	3
2	(Spain) Dani Sordo	Hyundai i20 WRC	13:19.2	+11.2	2
3	(France) Sébastien Ogier	Volkswagen Polo R WRC	13:19.7	+11.7	1
