= Pavlo Cherepin =

Ukrainian rally co-driver and film producer (born 1981)

Pavlo Cherepin Pavlo Cherepin
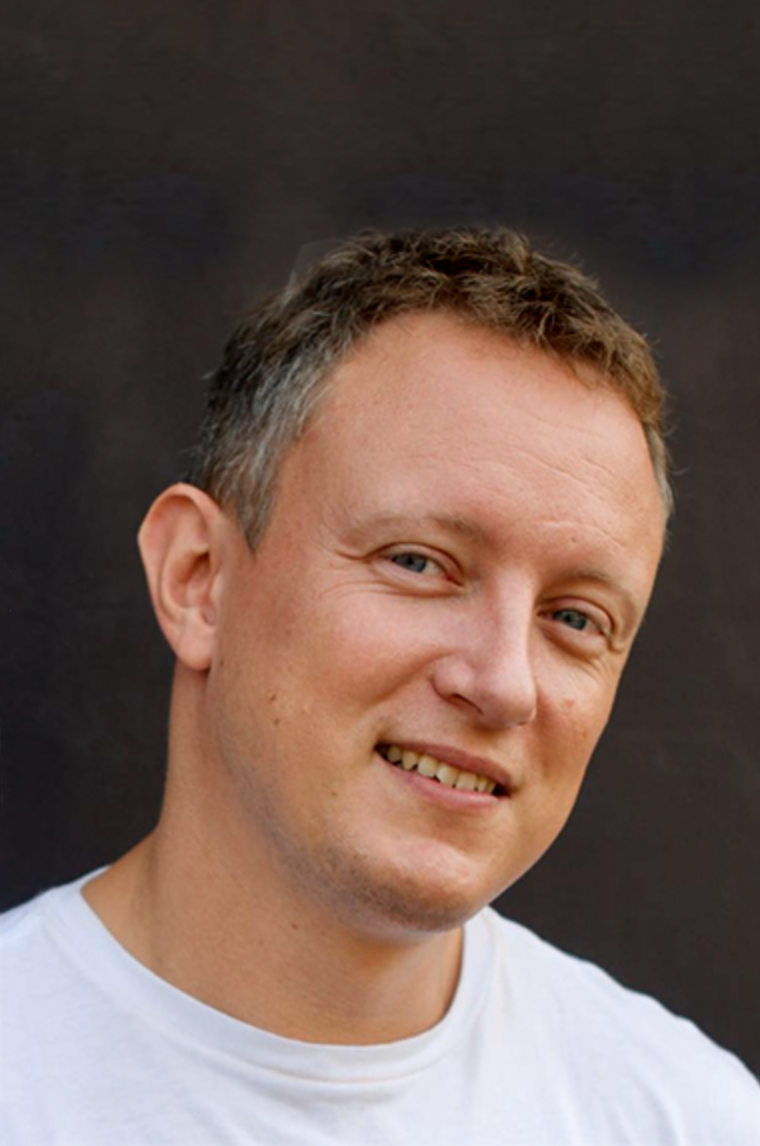

Background information
- Born: September 30, 1981 (age 45); Kyiv Ukraine
- Origin: Ukraine
- Occupations: producer, director
- Years active: as a rally driver 2007-2015

Pavlo Cherepin (Ukrainian: Павло Черепін; born September 30, 1981, in the Ukrainian SSR of the Soviet Union – in present-day Ukraine) is a Ukrainian media producer and director, co-founder of United Heroes Group (with Egor Olesov and Natalia Gordienko), rally co-driver, vice-champion of Ukraine (2010), and winner of two rounds of the World Rally Championship in WRC-2 (2014).

== Biography ==
=== Education ===
In 1998, Cherepin graduated from High School No. 57 in Kyiv with an emphasis on English language studies. In 2023, he graduated from the Institute of Foreign Philology at Taras Shevchenko National University of Kyiv.

=== Career outside motorsport ===
Combining his expertise in media production and professional sports, Cherepin is primarily known as a media manager and show-runner for sports films and shows such as "24”, "Five Finals”, "Special Atmosphere", "Line of Attack”, "Auto_Goal!”, "Supermatch” and others.

In late 2021, Cherepin and Natalia Gordienko, (who founded media brand Heroes in 2016), decided to unite forces with well-known Ukrainian film director and producer Egor Olesov to create United Heroes Group.

After the 2022 Russian invasion to Ukraine, the company was focused on creating international documentary films that highlighted various aspects of the war for a wide international audience. In particular, the films Cyberwar 2022 and Hunger, created by Heroes Docs (part of United Heroes Group) and Czech-Italian production company So What Media, have been shown on channels and platforms in Germany, Spain, Portugal, Estonia, Lithuania, Latvia, Poland, etc., and have been awarded and selected for international film festival programs. The film Inside Ukraine, created for Korean TV-channel MBC together with director Kim Yongmi, was recognized by the Hinzpeter Award jury. In 2023, United Heroes Group continued to create high-quality feature films and documentaries in partnership with well-known international producers and broadcasters.

Cherepin's career from the beginning was closely associated with the sport. From 2001 to 2007 he worked as a journalist and TV commentator, creator of the program Our football, and commentator for the UEFA Champions League, Ukrainian Premier League, UEFA European Championship and FIFA World Cup matches on Ukrainian Inter, Ukrayina, and Pershyi Natsionalnyi TV channels. In 2002, he created the project "ua-football", which became one of the leading online sports media in Ukraine.

From 2005 to 2007, Cherepin was the Marketing Director of the Professional Football League of Ukraine. Since 2008, he is a business consultant in the field of sports marketing and online media.

=== Amateur rally ===
Relationship with motorsports for Cherepin started in amateur rally. In 2007 and 2008, he took part in several rounds of the FAU Rally Cup for production vehicles, using his own Subaru Impreza as the first pilot. Cherepin's professional debut occurred at one of the most popular Ukrainian competitions, the Yalta Rally. The crew of Gennady Sanchenko and Pavlo Cherepin led the entire race distance, and, according to Pavlo, during the race they swapped the driver's and co-driver's role several times. However, it was not more than an experiment; Cherepin's serious career as a rally co-driver began three years later.

=== Professional rally ===
==== Ukrainian Rally Championship ====
Early winter 2010, when Oleksandr Saliuk and Adrian Aftanaziv stopped their collaboration, the current champion of Ukraine started looking for a new partner. In search of a navigator Saliuk occasionally performed with Oleksiy Mochanov (WRC Rally of Turkey) and Ivan Herman (Rally Bukovina), but soon started cooperation with Cherepin.

The crew's first start ended with failure: just before the finish of the Chumatskyy Shlyakh Rally, the red Mitsubishi Lancer Evo lost the pace and couldn't come back on the road. But it was the only failure of the 2010 season – after that the crew won the Mariupol, Galicia and Kyivska Rus rallies, and before the final round of the championship became the main contender for the title. Finally, Saliuk and Cherepin finished seventh at the Yalta Rally, and Saliuk won the title among the drivers. At the same time, Cherepin, who started the season from the second event, didn't collect the needed points and became only vice-champion of Ukraine among the co-drivers.

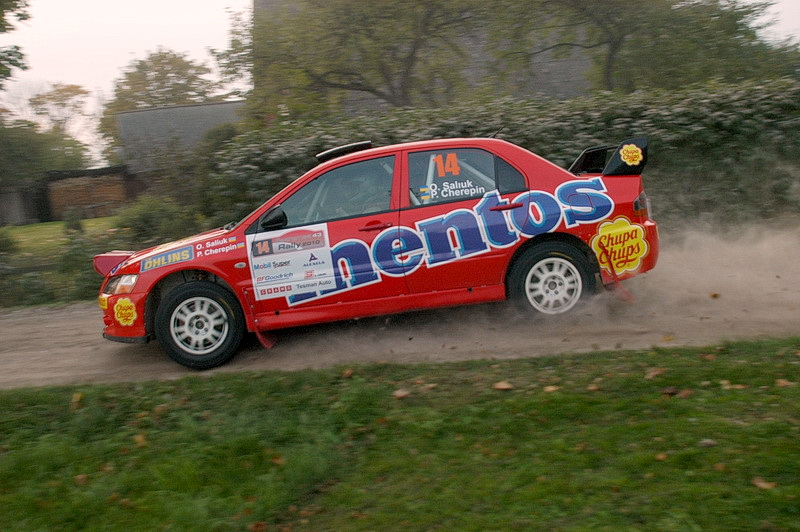
Oleksandr Saliuk Jr. and Pavlo Cherepin at the Saaremaa Rally, Estonia, 2010

The same year, the crew made its debut in foreign competitions, taking part in two rounds of the Latvian championship, as well as in the Estonian Rally Saaremaa. By the end of the Rally Latvia Saliuk and Cherepin ranked second in class N4, and it remains the best result for Ukrainian crews in Latvian rally competitions.

The next Ukrainian championship, unlike the previous one, began successfully for the crew - with a convincing victory in the Chumatskyy Shlyakh Rally. However, soon after Saliuk got a shoulder injury playing squash, so the crew passed the following two rounds of the championship. After an enforced break Saliuk and Cherepin started in the Kyivska Rus rally, but retired early. As a result, Cherepin only obtained tenth position in the final standings of the 2011 Ukrainian championship.

After that, the majority of Cherepin's starts were at foreign competitions. In Ukrainian rallies, he appeared only once - with Oleksiy Kikireshko at the 2012 Galicia rally where the crew took fourth place overall.

==== Intercontinental Rally Challenge ====
The highlight of Cherepin's career was participating in the Intercontinental Rally Challenge. Saliuk and Cherepin started in IRC twice with the best result of 7th place at Rallye Açores. But after the next race, Rally Islas Canarias, both drivers decided to stop their collaboration.

==== World Rally Championship ====
Cherepin debuted in the World Rally Championship along with Oleksandr Saliuk in 2011. As a part of Mentos Ascania Racing the crew took part in six rounds of the Production World Rally Championship in Sweden, Portugal, Finland, Australia, Spain and Wales. Only once during the season the crew didn't finish the rally, rolling over the roof several times after a failed jump in Finland. The best result was in Australia, where the Ukrainian tandem took eighth place overall and third in Production WRC.

After the break with Saliuk, Cherepin started in the WRC episodically for two years. His drivers – Oleksiy Kikireshko and Oleksiy Tamrazov – rarely achieved high results, in most cases, ending the race early. The only honorable mention for Cherepin in this period was the fourth place in the WRC2 at the Acropolis Rally with Tamrazov.

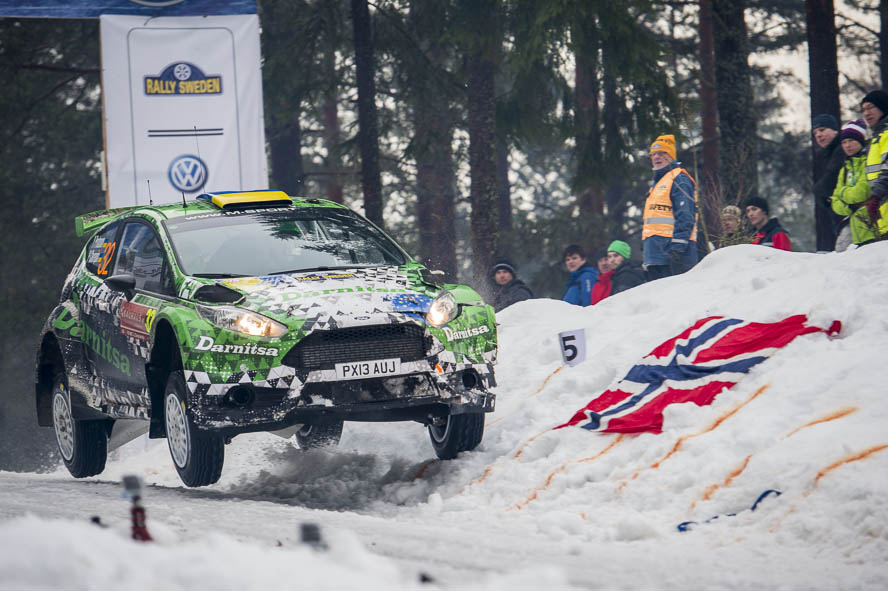
Yurii Protasov and Pavlo Cherepin, Rally Sweden, 2014

Quite different events unfolded from the beginning of 2014, when Cherepin received an invitation to become a co-driver of the talented Ukrainian driver Yuriy Protasov. At the first start in Rally Monte-Carlo, Protasov and Cherepin won in the WRC2 category. After two months, they repeated it at Rally Mexico, and in the middle of the season, the crew got the status of season favorite.

Season 2015 started for Protasov and Cherepin with a brand new car – Citroen DS3 WRC prepared by D-Max Racing. The debut race did not go the best way, and after that the crew changed their car back to a Ford Fiesta RS WRC. The second WRC round in Sweden became historic for Yuriy and Pavlo: setting the best time overall on special stage 6, they become the first Ukrainian crew able to make it.

At the next rounds of Championship in Mexico and Argentina Protasov and Cherepin returned to the Ford Fiesta RRC. Leading the WRC 2 both times, the crew managed only to finish outside the top three due to technical problems (engine overheating in Mexico and broken suspension in Argentina). Luck came back in Italy where the crew finally won the WRC 2 round with the famous Paolo Andreucci second and Jan Kopecky third. Spirited by this result, the crew became third in Finland and Germany and second in Australia, breaking their personal record with four podiums in a row.

== Filmography ==
Name of the movie/show	The year of the premiere	Brief description
“Cyberwar 2022” (documentary)	2022	The story of Ukraine and its allies' cyber and information resistance during the war against the Russian Federation. Personal stories of cyber activists and interviews with world-class cybersecurity experts, explaining in detail what the hidden layer of modern warfare looks like.
“Hunger” (documentary)	2022	A global look at Russia's use of food reserves as a weapon during a full-scale invasion of Ukraine.
“Inside Ukraine” (documentary)	2022	The view of Korean documentary filmmaker Kim Yong Mi on the events of the first months of the Russian invasion of Ukraine.
“24” (documentary)	2022	Interweaving stories of a family of sports refugees in Poland and the Ukrainia national volleyball team at the 2022 World Cup.
“Five finals” (documentary)	2022	A documentary film about the Ukrainia national football team, which was completed and shown in cinemas after the start of the full-scale invasion of Ukraine by Russia in 2022. The film reveals the story of the Ukrainian team's struggle for a place in the playoff for the 2022 World Cup qualification. After losing important points at the start, the head coach and hero of Ukrainian football, Andriy Shevchenko, left his post, and the new coach unexpectedly became Alexander Petrakov, who had never worked with adult football teams, but successfully worked with the Ukrainian youth teams, winning the U-19 World Cup. The team with a new coach has no room for error and no time for preparation or friendly matches, but they have 5 important games on their calendar, each of which has become a real final for Ukraine.
“Special atmosphere” (documentary)	2021	A documentary film revealing the details of the preparation of the Ukrainia national football team, led by Andriy Shevchenko, for EURO 2020.
“The Line of Attack” (documentary)	2021	Documentary film about the Ukrainian volleyball team and its participation in the 2021 European Championship.
“Auto_goal” (reality show)	2020-2021	An exciting entertainment show that combines two elements: football and motorsport.
“Supermatch” (TV show)	2020	The hosts travel around the world, introducing viewers to the fantastic atmosphere of the hottest football derbies.
“Scarman” (reality show)	2019 - present (3 seasons, ongoing)	Stories of scars that significantly affect self-confidence and hinder the comfortable life of the show's participants. Inspired by the stories of the heroes, the tattoo artist comes up with true artistic masterpieces, covering scars on the body and "healing" scars in the soul with the power of art.

== Career results ==
=== WRC results ===
Year	Entrant	Car	1	2	3	4	5	6	7	8	9	10	11	12	13	Pos.	Points
2011	Mentos Ascania Racing	Mitsubishi Lancer Evo IX	SWE; 32	MEX	POR; 20	JOR	ITA	ARG	GRE	FIN; Ret	GER	AUS; 8	FRA	ESP; 30	GBR; 25	24	4
2012	Mentos Ascania Racing	Mitsubishi Lancer Evo IX	MON	SWE	MEX	POR	ARG; Ret	GRE; Ret	NZL; Ret	FIN	GER	GBR	FRA	ITA	ESP	NC	0
2013	AT Rally	Ford Fiesta RS WRC	MON	SWE; 32	MEX	POR	ARG									НК	0
2013	AT Rally	Ford Fiesta RRC						GRE; 14	ITA	FIN	GER	AUS	FRA	ESP	GBR	НК	0
2014	Darnitsa Motorsport	Ford Fiesta R5	MON; 10	SWE; 15	MEX; 10	POR; 31				FIN; 43						26th	2
2014	Darnitsa Motorsport	Ford Fiesta RRC					ARG; Ret	ITA; 13	POL			AUS; 13			GBR; 20	26th	2
2014	M-Sport WRT	Ford Fiesta RS WRC									GER; 11		FRA; 16	ESP; 11		26th	2
2015	D-Max Racing	Citroën DS3 WRC	MON; 16													14th*	8*
2015	Yuriy Protasov	Ford Fiesta RS WRC		SWE; 9												14th*	8*
2015	Yuriy Protasov	Ford Fiesta RRC			MEX; 13	ARG; 13	POR	ITA; 7	POL	FIN; 13		AUS; 11		ESP	GBR	14th*	8*
2015	Yuriy Protasov	Ford Fiesta R5									GER; 15		FRA; 20			14th*	8*

* Season still in progress.

=== PWRC results ===
Year	Entrant	Car	1	2	3	4	5	6	7	8	Pos.	Points
2011	Mentos Ascania Racing	Mitsubishi Lancer Evo IX	SWE; 7	POR; 6	ARG	FIN; Ret	AUS; 3	ESP; 5	GBR; 8		8	43
2012	Mentos Ascania Racing	Mitsubishi Lancer Evo IX	MON	MEX	ARG; Ret	GRE; Ret	NZL; Ret	GER	ITA	ESP	NC	0

=== WRC 2 results ===
Year	Entrant	Car	1	2	3	4	5	6	7	8	9	10	11	12	13	Pos.	Points
2013	AT Rally	Ford Fiesta RRC	MON	SWE	MEX	POR	ARG	GRE; 4	ITA	FIN	GER	AUS	FRA	ESP	GBR	27th	12
2014	Yuriy Protasov	Ford Fiesta R5	MON; 1	SWE; 5	MEX; 1	POR; 14										4th	90
2014	Yuriy Protasov	Ford Fiesta RRC					ARG; Ret	ITA; 3	POL	FIN	GER	AUS; 3	FRA	ESP	GBR	4th	90
2015	Darnitsa Motorsport	Ford Fiesta RRC	MON	SWE	MEX; 5	ARG; 4	POR	ITA; 1	POL	FIN; 3	GER	AUS; 2	FRA	ESP; 5	GBR; 13	2nd	90

=== Podiums ===
#	Rally	Season	Class	Pos.	Co-driver	Car
1	Rally Australia	2011	PWRC	3	(Ukraine) Oleksandr Saliuk, Jr.	Mitsubishi Lancer Evo IX
2	(Monaco) Monte Carlo Rally	2014	WRC 2	1	(Ukraine) Yuriy Protasov	Ford Fiesta R5
3	Rally Mexico	2014	WRC 2	1	(Ukraine) Yuriy Protasov	Ford Fiesta R5
4	(Italy) Rally d'Italia	2014	WRC 2	3	(Ukraine) Yuriy Protasov	Ford Fiesta RRC
5	Rally Australia	2014	WRC 2	1	(Ukraine) Yuriy Protasov	Ford Fiesta RRC
6	(Italy) Rally d'Italia	2015	WRC 2	1	(Ukraine) Yuriy Protasov	Ford Fiesta RRC
7	Rally Finland	2015	WRC 2	3	(Ukraine) Yuriy Protasov	Ford Fiesta RRC
8	(Germany) Rallye Deutschland	2015	RC 2	3	(Ukraine) Yuriy Protasov	Ford Fiesta R5
9	Rally Australia	2015	WRC 2	2	(Ukraine) Yuriy Protasov	Ford Fiesta RRC

== Interesting facts ==
Cherepin is the first Ukrainian co-driver to win a single special stage in WRC overall – it happened on SS6 of the 2015 Rally Sweden.

Cherepin is the only Ukrainian co-driver who scored points in the World Rally Championship. This achievement is hard to repeat because Cherepin gained the points with two different drivers – Oleksandr Saliuk Jr. and Yuriy Protasov.
