= 2015 WRC2 Championship =

The 2015 FIA WRC2 Championship was the third season of WRC2, a rallying championship organised and governed by the Fédération Internationale de l'Automobile, running in support of the World Rally Championship. The Championship was open to cars complying with R4, R5, and Super 2000 regulations. The Championship was composed by thirteen Rallies; and Drivers and Teams must nominate a maximum of seven event. The best six results are counted towards the championship.

Nasser Al-Attiyah was the defending champion, as he won the 2014 title by just three points.

== Calendar ==
The 2015 calendar was announced at a meeting of the FIA World Motor Sport Council in Beijing in September 2014. The season maintained the same rallies as the 2014 season and was contested over thirteen rounds in Europe, the Americas and Oceania.

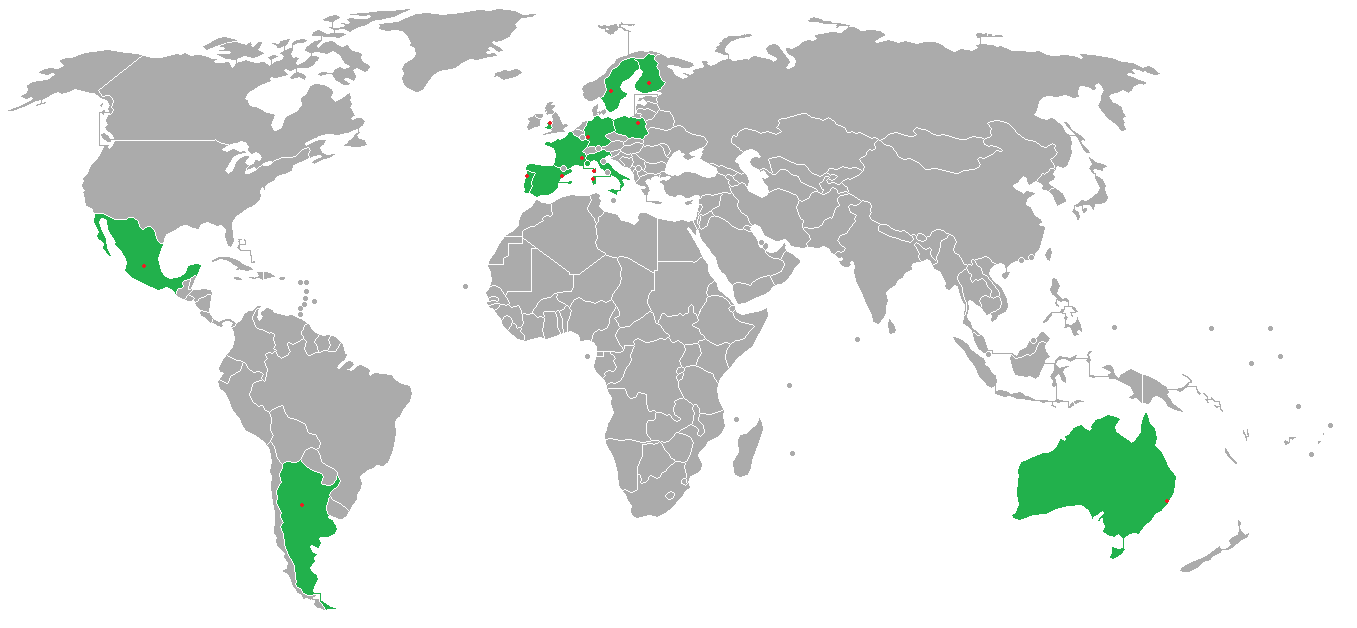
A map showing the locations of the rallies in the 2015 season

Round	Dates	Rally name	Rally headquarters	Surface
1	22–25 January	(Monaco) Monte Carlo Rally	Gap, Hautes-Alpes, France	Mixed
2	13–15 February	Rally Sweden	Hagfors, Värmland	Snow
3	6–8 March	Rally Mexico	León, Guanajuato	Gravel
4	24–26 April	Rally Argentina	Villa Carlos Paz, Córdoba	Gravel
5	22–24 May	Rally de Portugal	Matosinhos, Porto	Gravel
6	12–14 June	(Italy) Rally Italia Sardegna	Alghero, Sardinia	Gravel
7	3–5 July	Rally Poland	Mikołajki, Warmia-Masuria	Gravel
8	31 July–2 August	Rally Finland	Jyväskylä, Keski-Suomi	Gravel
9	21–23 August	(Germany) Rallye Deutschland	Trier, Rhineland-Palatinate	Tarmac
10	11–13 September	Rally Australia	Coffs Harbour, New South Wales	Gravel
11	2–4 October	(France) Tour de Corse	Ajaccio, Corse-du-Sud	Tarmac
12	23–25 October	(Spain) Rally de Catalunya	Salou, Tarragona	Mixed
13	13–15 November	(United Kingdom) Wales Rally GB	Deeside, Flintshire	Gravel

Notes:

- ^1 — The Rallies of Germany and France were provisional inclusions subject to negotiation of a new agreement between their organisers and series promoters.

=== Calendar changes ===
- The Rallye Monte Carlo adopted Rally-2 regulations, allowing retired competitors to restart the event the next day with a time penalty. Prior to 2015, the Rallye Monte Carlo was the only event being run without Rally-2 regulations.
- The Rally de Portugal and Rally Argentina swapped places in the calendar.
- The Rally of Portugal moved from its base in the town of Faro in the Algarve region—where it had been headquartered from 2007 until 2014—and relocated to the country's north, its original home prior until its removal from the calendar in 2002.
- On 6 February 2015, the Fédération Française du Sport Automobile (FFSA) announced that the Tour de Corse would replace the Rallye de France Alsace on the calendar for financial reasons.

== Regulation changes ==
- In the WRC 2 and WRC 3 Championships for Teams, only the best placed car in a team will be taken into account for points.
- A car which has not started from the start line within 20 seconds will be considered as retired and will be able to restart under Rally 2 on the subsequent day.
- The transmission of performance data or information to or from a competing car, not in relation with safety, is forbidden during special stages to help promote greater competition.

== Teams and drivers ==
Entries
	Entrant		Drivers		Co-drivers	Car	Class	Tyre	Rounds
(Spain)	ACSM Rallye Team	(Portugal)	Bernardo Sousa	(Portugal)	Hugo Magalhães	Peugeot 208 T16 R5	R5	H	5–7
(Spain)	ACSM Rallye Team	(Spain)	Nil Solans	(Spain)	Miquel Ibáñez	Peugeot 208 T16 R5	R5	H	9, 11–13
(Spain)	ACSM Rallye Team	(Andorra)	Joan Carchat	(Andorra)	Claudi Ribeiro	Mitsubishi Lancer Evo X	R4	H	5–7, 9, 11–13
(Sweden)	Fredrik Åhlin	(Sweden)	Fredrik Åhlin	(Norway)	Morten Erik Abrahamsen	Ford Fiesta R5	R5	M	2, 8, 13
(Qatar)	Nasser Al-Attiyah	(Qatar)	Nasser Al-Attiyah	(France)	Matthieu Baumel	Ford Fiesta RRC	S	M	3
(Qatar)	Nasser Al-Attiyah	(Qatar)	Nasser Al-Attiyah	(France)	Matthieu Baumel	Ford Fiesta RRC	S	P	5–7, 10
(Qatar)	Nasser Al-Attiyah	(Qatar)	Nasser Al-Attiyah	(France)	Matthieu Baumel	Škoda Fabia R5	R5	P	9, 12
(Argentina)	Juan Carlos Alonso	(Argentina)	Juan Carlos Alonso	(Argentina)	Juan Pablo Monasterolo	Ford Fiesta R5	R5	TBA	8
(Paraguay)	Didier Arias	(Paraguay)	Didier Arias	(Paraguay)	Héctor Núñez	Ford Fiesta R5	R5	D	4
(Italy)	Enrico Brazzoli	(Italy)	Enrico Brazzoli	(Italy)	Maurizio Barone	Subaru Impreza WRX STi	R4	H	5–6, 9, 12
(Austria)	BRR Baumschlager Rallye & Racing Team	(Germany)	Armin Kremer	(Germany)	Klaus Wicha	Škoda Fabia S2000	S	P	1
(Austria)	BRR Baumschlager Rallye & Racing Team	(Germany)	Armin Kremer	(Germany)	Pirmin Winklhofer	Škoda Fabia R5	R5	P	5–7, 9, 11–12
(Republic of Ireland)	Eamonn Boland	(Republic of Ireland)	Eamonn Boland	(Republic of Ireland)	Michael Morrissey	Subaru Impreza WRX STi	R4	M	1–2, 6, 9, 11
(Poland)	C-Rally	(Poland)	Jarosław Kołtun	(Poland)	Ireneusz Pleskot	Ford Fiesta R5	R5	P	2, 7, 12–13
(France)	Eric Camilli	(France)	Eric Camilli	(France)	Benjamin Veillas	Ford Fiesta R5	R5	M	1
(Republic of Ireland)	Keith Cronin	(Republic of Ireland)	Keith Cronin	(United Kingdom)	Stuart Loudon	Citroën DS3 R5	R5	M	6
(Republic of Ireland)	Keith Cronin	(United Kingdom)	Martin McCormack	(Republic of Ireland)	James O'Reilly	Škoda Fabia S2000	S	M	13
(Paraguay)	Diego Domínguez	(Paraguay)	Diego Domínguez	(Argentina)	Edgardo Galindo	Ford Fiesta R5	R5	D	4
(United Kingdom)	Drive DMACK	(Finland)	Jari Ketomaa	(Finland)	Kaj Lindström	Ford Fiesta R5	R5	D	2–5, 7–8, 12–13
(United Kingdom)	Drive DMACK	(Peru)	Nicolás Fuchs	(Argentina)	Fernando Mussano	Ford Fiesta R5	R5	D	4, 13
(United Kingdom)	Drive DMACK	(Estonia)	Sander Pärn	(United Kingdom)	James Morgan	Ford Fiesta R5	R5	D	5, 7–8
(United Kingdom)	Drive DMACK	(United Kingdom)	Peter Taylor	(United Kingdom)	Andrew Roughead	Ford Fiesta R5	R5	D	13
(United Kingdom)	Drive DMACK	(Norway)	Eyvind Brynildsen	(Sweden)	Anders Fredriksson	Ford Fiesta RRC	S	D	2, 8
(United Kingdom)	Drive DMACK 2	(Australia)	Scott Pedder	(Australia)	Dale Moscatt	Ford Fiesta R5	R5	D	10
(Italy)	E2-Tre Colli World Rally Team	(United Kingdom)	Tom Cave	(United Kingdom)	Craig Parry	Ford Fiesta R5	R5	P	13
(Ukraine)	Eurolamp World Rally Team	(Ukraine)	Valeriy Gorban	(Ukraine)	Volodymyr Korsia	Mini John Cooper Works S2000	S	P	2–3, 5–8, 13
(Ukraine)	Eurolamp World Rally Team	(Ukraine)	Oleksiy Kikireshko	(Estonia)	Kuldar Sikk	Mini John Cooper Works S2000	S	P	2
(Ukraine)	Eurolamp World Rally Team	(Russia)	Sergey Uger	(Estonia)	Sergei Larens	Mini John Cooper Works S2000	S	P	7
(Ukraine)	Eurolamp World Rally Team	(Finland)	Jussi Vainionpää	(Finland)	Mika Juntunen	Citroën DS3 R5	R5	TBA	8
(France)	Alain Foulon	(France)	Alain Foulon	(France)	Gilles Delarche	Mitsubishi Lancer Evo X	R4	M	1, 5, 7, 11–12
(France)	Alain Foulon	(France)	Alain Foulon	(Finland)	Mikko Lukka	Mitsubishi Lancer Evo X	R4	M	8
(Italy)	F.P.F. Sport s.r.l.	(Italy)	Paolo Andreucci	(Italy)	Anna Andreussi	Peugeot 208 T16 R5	R5	P	6
(Spain)	Peugeot España	(Spain)	José Antonio Suarez	(Spain)	Cándido Carrera	Peugeot 208 T16 R5	R5	M	12
(Peru)	Nicolás Fuchs	(Peru)	Nicolás Fuchs	(Argentina)	Fernando Mussano	Ford Fiesta R5	R5	D	3, 5–8
(France)	Quentin Giordano	(France)	Quentin Giordano	(France)	Valentin Sarreaud	Citroën DS3 R5	R5	M	1, 5–6
(France)	Quentin Giordano	(France)	Quentin Giordano	(France)	Valentin Sarreaud	Citroën DS3 RRC	S	M	7–9, 11–12
(Norway)	Anders Grøndal	(Norway)	Anders Grøndal	(Norway)	Roger Eilertsen	Citroën DS3 R5	R5	P	2, 5–6, 8
(Switzerland)	Jonathan Hirschi	(Switzerland)	Jonathan Hirschi	(France)	Vincent Landais	Peugeot 208 T16 R5	R5	M	1
(Switzerland)	Jonathan Hirschi	(Switzerland)	Jonathan Hirschi	(France)	Vincent Landais	Peugeot 208 T16 R5	R5	P	5, 7, 9
(Switzerland)	Jonathan Hirschi	(Switzerland)	Jonathan Hirschi	(France)	Victor Bellotto	Peugeot 208 T16 R5	R5	P	11
(South Africa)	Henk Lategan	(South Africa)	Henk Lategan	(South Africa)	Barry White	Škoda Fabia S2000	S	TBA	5
(Italy)	Gianluca Linari	(Italy)	Gianluca Linari	(Italy)	Nicola Arena	Subaru Impreza WRX STi	R4	P	2, 4, 6, 8, 10–11, 13
(Poland)	Lotto Team	(Poland)	Krzysztof Hołowczyc	(Poland)	Łukasz Kurzeja	Ford Fiesta R5	R5	TBA	7
(France)	Julien Maurin	(France)	Julien Maurin	(France)	Nicolas Klinger	Ford Fiesta RRC	S	P	1, 5–7, 9, 11–12
(Estonia)	ME3 Rally Team	(Estonia)	Karl Kruuda	(Estonia)	Martin Järveoja	Citroën DS3 R5	R5	P	5–8
(Italy)	Motorsport Italia s.r.l.	(Italy)	Max Rendina	(Italy)	Mario Pizzuti	Mitsubishi Lancer Evo X	R4	P	2–3, 5–6
(Italy)	Motorsport Italia s.r.l.	(Italy)	Max Rendina	(Italy)	Emanuele Inglesi	Mitsubishi Lancer Evo X	R4	P	7–9, 11, 13
(Italy)	Motorsport Italia s.r.l.	(Australia)	Nathan Quinn	(New Zealand)	David Calder	Mitsubishi Lancer Evo X	R4	P	10
(Italy)	Motorsport Italia s.r.l.	(Norway)	Eyvind Brynildsen	(Sweden)	Anders Fredriksson	Škoda Fabia R5	R5	P	13
(Romania)	Napoca Rally Academy	(Italy)	Simone Tempestini	(Italy)	Matteo Chiarcossi	Subaru Impreza WRX STi	R4	P	2–4, 6
(Romania)	Napoca Rally Academy	(Italy)	Marco Tempestini	(Romania)	Dorin Pulpea	Subaru Impreza WRX STi	R4	P	5, 7
(Argentina)	Geronimo Padilla	(Argentina)	Geronimo Padilla	(Argentina)	Edgardo Galindo	Ford Fiesta R5	R5	TBA	6
(Australia)	Scott Pedder	(Australia)	Scott Pedder	(Australia)	Dale Moscatt	Ford Fiesta R5	R5	D	5–8
(France)	PH Sport	(France)	Stéphane Lefebvre	(Belgium)	Stéphane Prevot	Citroën DS3 RRC	S	M	8
(France)	PH Sport	(France)	Stéphane Lefebvre	(Belgium)	Stéphane Prevot	Citroën DS3 R5	R5	M	1, 3, 5–7
(France)	PH Sport	(France)	Quentin Giordano	(France)	Valentin Sarreaud	Citroën DS3 R5	R5	M	13
(Ukraine)	Yuriy Protasov	(Ukraine)	Yuriy Protasov	(Ukraine)	Pavlo Cherepin	Ford Fiesta RRC	S	P	3–4, 6, 8, 10, 12–13
(Slovakia)	Peugeot Sport Slovakia	(Slovakia)	Martin Koči	(Czech Republic)	Lukáš Kostka	Peugeot 208 T16 R5	R5	M	5, 7–9, 12
(Poland)	Hubert Ptaszek	(Poland)	Hubert Ptaszek	(Poland)	Kamil Kozdroń	Ford Fiesta S2000	S	D	7
(Poland)	Hubert Ptaszek	(Poland)	Hubert Ptaszek	(Poland)	Kamil Kozdroń	Škoda Fabia R5	R5	D	13
(Poland)	Radoslaw Raczkowski	(Poland)	Radoslaw Raczkowski	(Poland)	Szymon Gospodarczyk	Ford Fiesta R5	R5	TBA	7
(Spain)	RMC Motorsport	(Chile)	Ramón Torres Fuentes	(Spain)	David Vazquez Liste	Ford Fiesta R5	R5	D	5–7, 12
(France)	Saintéloc Junior Team	(Republic of Ireland)	Craig Breen	(United Kingdom)	Scott Martin	Peugeot 208 T16 R5	R5	M	1, 5, 8–9, 11–13
(Greece)	Jourdan Serderidis	(Greece)	Jourdan Serderidis	(Belgium)	William Mergny	Citroën DS3 R5	R5	M	1
(Greece)	Jourdan Serderidis	(Greece)	Jourdan Serderidis	(Belgium)	Frédéric Miclotte	Citroën DS3 R5	R5	D	3, 7, 9, 11–12
(Czech Republic)	Škoda Motorsport	(Sweden)	Pontus Tidemand	(Sweden)	Emil Axelsson	Škoda Fabia R5	R5	M	5, 7–8, 11–13
(Czech Republic)	Škoda Motorsport	(Finland)	Esapekka Lappi	(Finland)	Janne Ferm	Škoda Fabia R5	R5	M	5–9, 11–12
(Czech Republic)	Škoda Motorsport	(Czech Republic)	Jan Kopecký	(Czech Republic)	Pavel Dresler	Škoda Fabia R5	R5	M	6, 9, 13
(Czech Republic)	Škoda Motorsport II	(Czech Republic)	Jan Kopecký	(Czech Republic)	Pavel Dresler	Škoda Fabia R5	R5	M	12
(Germany)	Škoda Auto Deutschland	(Germany)	Fabian Kreim	(Germany)	Frank Christian	Škoda Fabia R5	R5	M	9
(Poland)	Zbigniew Staniszewski	(Poland)	Zbigniew Staniszewski	(Poland)	Bartłomiej Boba	Peugeot 207 S2000	S	TBA	7
(Slovakia)	Styllex Slovak National Team	(Slovakia)	Martin Koči	(Czech Republic)	Lukáš Kostka	Ford Fiesta R5	R5	M	1
(Russia)	TAIF Rally Team	(Russia)	Radik Shaymiev	(Russia)	Maxim Tsvetkov	Ford Fiesta R5	R5	M	2–5, 8
(Russia)	TAIF Rally Team	(Estonia)	Mait Maarend	(Estonia)	Mihkel Kapp	Ford Fiesta R5	R5	M	12
(France)	Team ORECA	(France)	Eric Camilli	(France)	Benjamin Veillas	Ford Fiesta R5	R5	M	5–6, 8–9, 11–13
(France)	Team ORECA	(Finland)	Teemu Suninen	(Finland)	Mikko Markkula	Ford Fiesta R5	R5	M	9, 11–12
(Sweden)	Pontus Tidemand	(Sweden)	Pontus Tidemand	(Sweden)	Emil Axelsson	Ford Fiesta RRC	S	M	2
(Finland)	TGS Worldwide	(Finland)	Teemu Suninen	(Finland)	Mikko Markkula	Škoda Fabia S2000	S	TBA	7, 13
(Finland)	TGS Worldwide	(Russia)	Dmitri Biryukov	(Russia)	Evgeny Kalachev	Škoda Fabia S2000	S	TBA	9
(Italy)	Marco Vallario	(Italy)	Marco Vallario	(Italy)	Manuela Di Lorenzo	Mitsubishi Lancer Evo X	R4	D	1
(South Africa)	Barry White	(South Africa)	Henk Lategan	(South Africa)	Barry White	Škoda Fabia S2000	S	P	1
(Saudi Arabia)	Yazeed Racing	(Saudi Arabia)	Yazeed Al-Rajhi	(United Kingdom)	Michael Orr	Ford Fiesta RRC	S	M	2
(Saudi Arabia)	Yazeed Racing	(Saudi Arabia)	Yazeed Al-Rajhi	(United Kingdom)	Michael Orr	Ford Fiesta RRC	S	P	5–7, 10, 12
(Qatar)	Youth and Sports Qatar Rally Team	(Qatar)	Abdulaziz Al-Kuwari	(United Kingdom)	Marshall Clarke	Ford Fiesta RRC	S	M	3
(Qatar)	Youth and Sports Qatar Rally Team	(Qatar)	Abdulaziz Al-Kuwari	(United Kingdom)	Marshall Clarke	Ford Fiesta RRC	S	P	4–6, 10, 12–13

Icon	Class
R4	Classification within Group R
R5	Classification within Group R
S	Super 2000

== Rally summaries ==
Round	Event name	Winning driver	Winning co-driver	Winning Entry	Winning Car	Winning time	Report
1	(Monaco) Monte Carlo Rally	(France) Stéphane Lefebvre	(Belgium) Stéphane Prevot	(France) PH Sport	Citroën DS3 R5	3:49:36.7	Report
2	Rally Sweden	(Finland) Jari Ketomaa	(Finland) Kaj Lindström	(United Kingdom) Drive DMACK	Ford Fiesta R5	3:05:07.4	Report
3	Rally Mexico	(Qatar) Nasser Al-Attiyah	(France) Matthieu Baumel	(Qatar) Nasser Al-Attiyah	Ford Fiesta RRC	4:34:06.1	Report
4	Rally Argentina	(Qatar) Abdulaziz Al-Kuwari	(United Kingdom) Marshall Clarke	Youth & Sports Qatar Rally Team	Ford Fiesta RRC	3:57:47.5	Report
5	Rally de Portugal	(Qatar) Nasser Al-Attiyah	(France) Matthieu Baumel	(Qatar) Nasser Al-Attiyah	Ford Fiesta RRC	3:41:35.3	Report
6	(Italy) Rally Italia Sardegna	(Ukraine) Yuriy Protasov	(Ukraine) Pavlo Cherepin	(Ukraine) Yuriy Protasov	Ford Fiesta RRC	4:40:52.0	Report
7	Rally Poland	(Finland) Esapekka Lappi	(Finland) Janne Ferm	(Czech Republic) Škoda Motorsport	Škoda Fabia R5	2:32:02.6	Report
8	Rally Finland	(Finland) Esapekka Lappi	(Finland) Janne Ferm	(Czech Republic) Škoda Motorsport	Škoda Fabia R5	2:40:15.0	Report
9	(Germany) Rallye Deutschland	(Czech Republic) Jan Kopecký	(Czech Republic) Pavel Dresler	(Czech Republic) Škoda Motorsport	Škoda Fabia R5	3:47:18.8	Report
10	Rally Australia	(Qatar) Nasser Al-Attiyah	(France) Matthieu Baumel	(Qatar) Nasser Al-Attiyah	Ford Fiesta RRC	3:11:02.9	Report
11	(France) Tour de Corse	(France) Julien Maurin	(France) Nicolas Klinger	(France) Julien Maurin	Ford Fiesta RRC	2:46:11.3	Report
12	(Spain) Rally Catalunya	(Sweden) Pontus Tidemand	(Sweden) Emil Axelsson	(Czech Republic) Škoda Motorsport	Škoda Fabia R5	3:30:01.6	Report
13	(United Kingdom) Wales Rally GB	(Finland) Teemu Suninen	(Finland) Mikko Markkula	(Finland) TGS Worldwide	Škoda Fabia S2000	3:15:01.4	Report

== Results and standings ==
Points are awarded to the top ten classified finishers.

Position	1st	2nd	3rd	4th	5th	6th	7th	8th	9th	10th
Points	25	18	15	12	10	8	6	4	2	1

=== FIA WRC2 for Drivers ===
Pos.	Driver	MON (Monaco)	SWE (Sweden)	MEX (Mexico)	ARG (Argentina)	POR (Portugal)	ITA (Italy)	POL (Poland)	FIN (Finland)	GER (Germany)	AUS (Australia)	FRA (France)	ESP (Spain)	GBR (United Kingdom)	Drops	Points
1	(Qatar) Nasser Al-Attiyah			1		1	5	Ret		4	1		3		0	112
2	(Ukraine) Yuriy Protasov			5	4		1		3		2		5	13	0	90
3	(Finland) Esapekka Lappi					2	9	1	1	13		2	Ret		0	88
4	(Sweden) Pontus Tidemand		5			3		2	2			Ret	1	WD	0	86
5	(Qatar) Abdulaziz Al-Kuwari			4	1	6	4				3		8	4	4	84
6	(Finland) Jari Ketomaa		1	3	3	Ret		4					12	WD	0	67
7	(France) Eric Camilli	4				Ret	8		11	2		3	Ret	2	0	67
8	(Czech Republic) Jan Kopecký						3			1			2	WD	0	58
9	(Republic of Ireland) Craig Breen	2				Ret			Ret	5		4	Ret	3	0	55
10	(Finland) Teemu Suninen							6		6		5	13	1	0	51
11	(Germany) Armin Kremer	3				10	6	5		Ret		Ret	4		0	46
12	(Peru) Nicolás Fuchs			2	Ret	7	7	7	Ret					6	0	44
13	(France) Julien Maurin	Ret				4	Ret	8		10		1	15		0	42
14	(France) Stéphane Lefebvre	1		Ret		5	15	Ret	EX						0	35
15	(France) Quentin Giordano	6				Ret			Ret	3		8	Ret	7	0	33
16	(Poland) Jarosłav Koľtun		7					11					6	5	0	24
17	(Italy) Gianluca Linari		12		6		11		8		5			17	0	22
18	(Ukraine) Valeriy Gorban		3	Ret		8	10	Ret	Ret					14	0	20
19	(Australia) Scott Pedder					Ret	Ret	12	4		6				0	20
20	(Norway) Eyvind Brynildsen		2						Ret					15	0	18
21	(Paraguay) Diego Domínguez				2										0	18
22	(Italy) Paolo Andreucci						2								0	18
23	(Switzerland) Jonathan Hirschi	5				Ret	Ret			Ret		6			0	18
24	(Spain) Nil Solans									7		7	14	8	0	16
25	(Estonia) Karl Kruuda					11	Ret	3							0	15
26	(Italy) Max Rendina		14	6		Ret		15	7	14		10			0	15
27	(Saudi Arabia) Yazeed Al-Rajhi		4			Ret	Ret	DNS			Ret		Ret		0	12
28	(Australia) Nathan Quinn										4				0	12
29	(Norway) Anders Grøndal		10			Ret			5						0	11
30	(Paraguay) Didier Arias				5										0	10
31	(Sweden) Fredrik Åhlin		6						Ret					11	0	8
32	(Argentina) Juan Carlos Alonso								6						0	8
33	(France) Alain Foulon	7				16		18	9			12			0	8
34	(Italy) Simone Tempestini		9	Ret	7		17								0	8
35	(Greece) Jourdan Serderidis	Ret		7				16		15		11			0	6
36	(Chile) Ramón Torres Fuentes					15	13	14					7		0	6
37	(Andorra) Joan Carchat					Ret	16	13		9		9	Ret	9	0	6
38	(Ukraine) Oleksiy Kikireshko		8												0	4
39	(Italy) Marco Vallario	8													0	4
40	(Germany) Fabian Kreim									8					0	4
41	(Estonia) Sander Pärn					9		9	12						0	4
42	(Estonia) Mait Maarend												9		0	2
43	(Poland) Krzysztof Hołowczyc							10							0	1
44	(Finland) Jussi Vainionpää								10						0	1
45	(Slovakia) Martin Koči	Ret				Ret		19	Ret	Ret			10		0	1
46	(Italy) Max Rendina													10	0	1
Pos.	Driver	MON (Monaco)	SWE (Sweden)	MEX (Mexico)	ARG (Argentina)	POR (Portugal)	ITA (Italy)	POL (Poland)	FIN (Finland)	GER (Germany)	AUS (Australia)	FRA (France)	ESP (Spain)	GBR (United Kingdom)	Drops	Points

Key
Colour	Result
Gold	Winner
Silver	2nd place
Bronze	3rd place
Green	Points finish
Blue	Non-points finish
Blue	Non-classified finish (NC)
Purple	Did not finish (Ret)
Black	Excluded (EX)
Black	Disqualified (DSQ)
White	Did not start (DNS)
White	Cancelled (C)
Blank	Withdrew entry from the event (WD)

=== FIA WRC2 for Co-Drivers ===
Pos.	Co-driver	MON (Monaco)	SWE (Sweden)	MEX (Mexico)	ARG (Argentina)	POR (Portugal)	ITA (Italy)	POL (Poland)	FIN (Finland)	GER (Germany)	AUS (Australia)	FRA (France)	ESP (Spain)	GBR (United Kingdom)	Drops	Points
1	(France) Mathieu Baumel			1		1	5	Ret		4	1		3		0	112
2	(Ukraine) Pavlo Cherepin			5	4		1		3		2		5	13	0	90
3	(Finland) Janne Ferm					2	9	1	1	13		2	Ret		0	88
4	(Sweden) Emil Axelsson		5			3		2	2			Ret	1	WD	0	86
5	(United Kingdom) Marshall Clarke			4	1	6	4				3		8	4	4	84
6	(Finland) Kaj Lindström		1	3	3	Ret		4					12	WD	0	67
7	(France) Benjamin Veillas	4					8		11	2		3	Ret	2	0	67
8	(Czech Republic) Pavel Dresler						3			1			2	WD	0	58
9	(United Kingdom) Scott Martin	2				Ret			Ret	5		4	Ret	3	0	55
10	(Finland) Mikko Markkula							6		6		5	13	1	0	51
11	(Argentina) Fernando Mussano			2	Ret	7	7	7	Ret					6	0	44
12	(France) Nicolas Klinger	Ret				4	Ret	8		10		1	15		0	42
13	(Belgium) Stéphane Prevot	1		Ret		5	15	Ret	EX						0	35
14	(France) Valentin Sarreaud	6				Ret			Ret	3		8	Ret	7	0	33
15	(Germany) Pirmin Winklhofer					10	6	5		Ret		Ret	4		0	31
16	(Poland) Ireneusz Pleskot		7					11					6	5	0	24
17	(Italy) Nicola Arena			12	6		11		8		5			17	0	22
18	(Ukraine) Volodymyr Korsia		3	Ret		8	10	Ret	Ret					14	0	20
19	(Australia) Dale Moscatt					Ret	Ret	12	4		6				0	20
20	(Argentina) Edgardo Galindo				2		14								0	18
21	(Sweden) Anders Fredriksson		2						Ret					15	0	18
22	(Italy) Anna Andreussi						2								0	18
23	(Spain) Miquel Ibáñez									7		7	14	8	0	16
24	(Estonia) Martin Järveoja					11	Ret	3							0	15
25	(Germany) Klaus Wicha	3													0	15
26	(United Kingdom) Michael Orr		4			Ret	Ret	DNS			Ret		Ret		0	12
27	(Australia) David Calder										4				0	12
28	(Norway) Roger Eilertsen		10			Ret			5						0	11
29	(France) Vincent Landais	5				Ret		Ret		Ret					0	10
30	(Paraguay) Héctor Núñez				5										0	10
31	(Italy) Mario Pizzuti		14	6		Ret									0	8
32	(Norway) Morten Erik Abrahamsen		6						Ret					11	0	8
33	(Argentina) Juan Pablo Monasterolo								6						0	8
34	(France) Victor Bellotto											6			0	8
35	(Italy) Matteo Chiarcossi		9	Ret	7		17								0	8
36	(Italy) Emanuele Inglesi							15	7	14		10		10	0	8
37	(France) Gilles Delarche	7				16		18				12			0	6
38	(Belgium) Frédéric Miclotte			7				16		15		11			0	6
39	(Spain) David Vázquez Liste					15	13	14					7		0	6
40	(Andorra) Claudi Ribeiro					Ret	16	13		9		9	Ret	9	0	6
41	(Estonia) Kuldar Sikk		8												0	4
42	(Italy) Manuela Di Lorenzo	8													0	4
43	(Germany) Frank Christian									8					0	4
44	(United Kingdom) James Morgan					9		9	12						0	4
45	(Finland) Mikko Lukka								9						0	2
46	(Estonia) Mihkel Kapp												9		0	2
47	(Poland) Łukasz Kurzeja							10							0	1
48	(Finland) Mika Juntunen								10						0	1
49	(Czech Republic) Lukáš Kostka	Ret				Ret		19	Ret	Ret			10		0	1
Pos.	Co-driver	MON (Monaco)	SWE (Sweden)	MEX (Mexico)	ARG (Argentina)	POR (Portugal)	ITA (Italy)	POL (Poland)	FIN (Finland)	GER (Germany)	AUS (Australia)	FRA (France)	ESP (Spain)	GBR (United Kingdom)	Drops	Points

Key
Colour	Result
Gold	Winner
Silver	2nd place
Bronze	3rd place
Green	Points finish
Blue	Non-points finish
Blue	Non-classified finish (NC)
Purple	Did not finish (Ret)
Black	Excluded (EX)
Black	Disqualified (DSQ)
White	Did not start (DNS)
White	Cancelled (C)
Blank	Withdrew entry from the event (WD)

=== FIA WRC2 for Teams ===
Pos.	Team	MON (Monaco)	SWE (Sweden)	MEX (Mexico)	ARG (Argentina)	POR (Portugal)	ITA (Italy)	POL (Poland)	FIN (Finland)	GER (Germany)	AUS (Australia)	FRA (France)	ESP (Spain)	GBR (United Kingdom)	Points
1	(Czech Republic) Škoda Motorsport					1	1	1	1	1		1	1	WD	175
2	Youth and Sports Qatar Rally Team			2	1	3	3				1		6	4	118
3	(United Kingdom) Drive DMACK		1	1	2	5		3	5				9	6	113
4	(Italy) Motorsport Italia Srl		7	3		Ret		10	2	6	2	5		9	78
5	(France) Team ORECA					Ret	5		4	2		2	10	2	77
6	(Austria) BRR Baumschlager Rallye & Racing Team	3				6	3	4		Ret		Ret	3		65
7	(France) Saintéloc Junior Team	2				Ret			Ret	3		3	Ret	3	63
8	(Ukraine) Eurolamp World Rally Team		2	Ret		4	5	11	3					10	56
9	(France) PH Sport	1		Ret		2	7	Ret	EX					7	55
10	(Poland) C-Rally		4					7					4	5	40
11	(Spain) ACSM Rallye Team					Ret	8	8		4		4	11	8	36
12	(Finland) TGS Worldwide							5		Ret				1	35
13	(Romania) Napoca Rally Academy		5	Ret	3	9	10								27
14	(Estonia) ME3 Rally Team					7	Ret	2							24
15	(Spain) RMC Motorsport					10	6	9					5		21
16	(Czech Republic) Škoda Motorsport II												2		18
17	(Russia) TAIF Rally Team		6	Ret	Ret	8			Ret				7		18
18	(Saudi Arabia) Yazeed Racing		3			Ret	Ret	DNS			Ret		Ret		15
19	(United Kingdom) Drive DMACK 2										3				15
20	(Germany) Škoda Auto Deutschland									5					10
21	(Poland) Lotto Team							6							8
22	(Slovakia) Styllex Slovak National Team					Ret		12	Ret	Ret			8		4
Pos.	Team	MON (Monaco)	SWE (Sweden)	MEX (Mexico)	ARG (Argentina)	POR (Portugal)	ITA (Italy)	POL (Poland)	FIN (Finland)	GER (Germany)	AUS (Australia)	FRA (France)	ESP (Spain)	GBR (United Kingdom)	Points

Key
Colour	Result
Gold	Winner
Silver	2nd place
Bronze	3rd place
Green	Points finish
Blue	Non-points finish
Blue	Non-classified finish (NC)
Purple	Did not finish (Ret)
Black	Excluded (EX)
Black	Disqualified (DSQ)
White	Did not start (DNS)
White	Cancelled (C)
Blank	Withdrew entry from the event (WD)

=== FIA WRC2 Cup for Production Car Drivers ===
Pos.	Driver	MON (Monaco)	SWE (Sweden)	MEX (Mexico)	ARG (Argentina)	POR (Portugal)	ITA (Italy)	POL (Poland)	FIN (Finland)	GER (Germany)	AUS (Australia)	FRA (France)	ESP (Spain)	GBR (United Kingdom)	Drops	Points
1	(Italy) Gianluca Linari		2		1		1		2		2			3	0	119
2	(Andorra) Joan Carchat					Ret	3	1		1		1	Ret	1	0	115
3	(Italy) Max Rendina		4	1		Ret		2	1	4		2			0	110
4	(France) Alain Foulon	1				2		3	3			3			0	88
5	(Italy) Simone Tempestini		1	Ret	2		4								0	55
6	(Italy) Enrico Brazzoli					3	Ret			3			1		0	55
7	(Republic of Ireland) Eamonn Boland	Ret	3				2			2		WD			0	51
8	(Italy) Marco Tempestini					1									0	25
9	(Australia) Nathan Quinn										1				0	25
10	(Italy) Marco Vallario	2													0	18
11	(Italy) Max Rendina													2	0	18
Pos.	Driver	MON (Monaco)	SWE (Sweden)	MEX (Mexico)	ARG (Argentina)	POR (Portugal)	ITA (Italy)	POL (Poland)	FIN (Finland)	GER (Germany)	AUS (Australia)	FRA (France)	ESP (Spain)	GBR (United Kingdom)	Drops	Points

Key
Colour	Result
Gold	Winner
Silver	2nd place
Bronze	3rd place
Green	Points finish
Blue	Non-points finish
Blue	Non-classified finish (NC)
Purple	Did not finish (Ret)
Black	Excluded (EX)
Black	Disqualified (DSQ)
White	Did not start (DNS)
White	Cancelled (C)
Blank	Withdrew entry from the event (WD)

=== FIA WRC2 Cup for Production Car Co-Drivers ===
Pos.	Co-driver	MON (Monaco)	SWE (Sweden)	MEX (Mexico)	ARG (Argentina)	POR (Portugal)	ITA (Italy)	POL (Poland)	FIN (Finland)	GER (Germany)	AUS (Australia)	FRA (France)	ESP (Spain)	GBR (United Kingdom)	Drops	Points
1	(Italy) Nicola Arena		2		1		1		2		2			3	0	119
2	(Andorra) Claudi Ribeiro					Ret	3	1		1		1	Ret	1	0	115
3	(Italy) Emanuele Inglesi							2	1	4		2		2	0	91
4	(France) Gilles Delarche	1				2		3				3			0	73
5	(Italy) Matteo Chiarcossi		1	Ret	2		4								0	55
6	(Italy) Maurizio Barone					3	Ret			3			1		0	55
7	(Republic of Ireland) Michael Morrissey	Ret	3				2			2		WD			0	51
8	(Italy) Mario Pizzuti		4	1		Ret									0	37
9	(Romania) Dorin Pulpea					1									0	25
10	(Australia) David Calder										1				0	25
11	(Italy) Manuela Di Lorenzo	2													0	18
12	(Finland) Mikko Lukka								3						0	15
Pos.	Co-driver	MON (Monaco)	SWE (Sweden)	MEX (Mexico)	ARG (Argentina)	POR (Portugal)	ITA (Italy)	POL (Poland)	FIN (Finland)	GER (Germany)	AUS (Australia)	FRA (France)	ESP (Spain)	GBR (United Kingdom)	Points	Drops

Key
Colour	Result
Gold	Winner
Silver	2nd place
Bronze	3rd place
Green	Points finish
Blue	Non-points finish
Blue	Non-classified finish (NC)
Purple	Did not finish (Ret)
Black	Excluded (EX)
Black	Disqualified (DSQ)
White	Did not start (DNS)
White	Cancelled (C)
Blank	Withdrew entry from the event (WD)
