= Yuriy Protasov =

Ukrainian rally driver (born 1984)

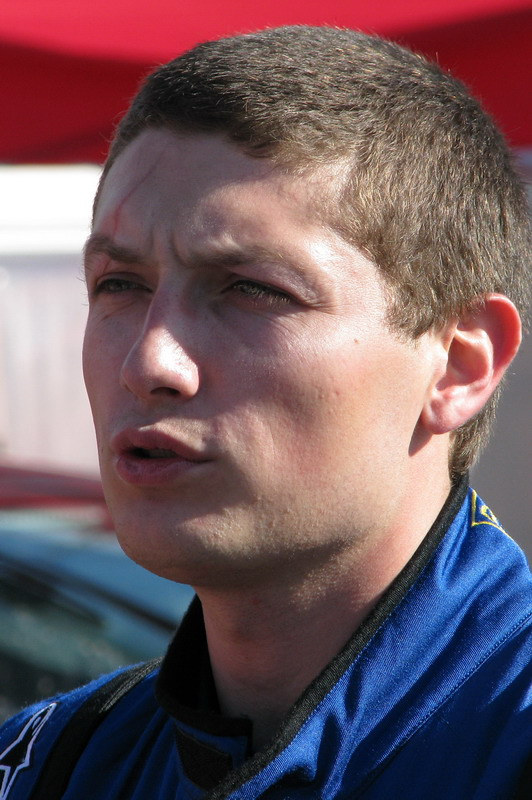
- Protasov at Rally Chernivtsi-6000

Personal information
- Nationality: Ukrainian
- Born: April 23, 1984 (age 42); Kyiv, Soviet Union (now Ukraine)

World Rally Championship record
- Years active: 2011–2015, 2018
- Teams: Darnitsa Motorsport
- Rallies: 46
- Championships: 0
- Rally wins: 0
- Podiums: 0
- Stage wins: 1
- Total points: 10
- First rally: 2011 Rally Sweden
- Last rally: 2018 Rally Sweden

Yuriy Leonidovych Protasov (Ukrainian: Юрій Леонідович Протасов; born 23 April 1984) is a rally driver from Ukraine. He won the Ukrainian Rally Championship in 2008. In 2011, Protasov contested in the Production World Rally Championship (PWRC) with the Darnitsa Motorsport driving a Mitsubishi Lancer Evo X.

== Career ==
=== Karting ===
Protasov began his motorsport career in 1994 under the guidance of his father, a famous Ukrainian driver Leonid Protasov. In the second season he won the Ukrainian Karting Championship in the class "Pioneer-A" (1995). This was followed by a similar victories in the Ukrainian Karting Championship 1996 (class "Pioneer-B"), 1997 (classes "Popular-Junior" and "ICA-Junior") and 1998 (Class "Popular-Junior"), as well as "bronze" in the Ukrainian Karting Championship in 1998 in the class "ICA-Junior."

The latest achievement of Protasov in karting was the "bronze" in the International karting race "Chaika-2001" (class «ICA»).

=== Circuit racing ===
After the end of the active performances in karting, Protasov tried his hand at circuit racing, performing in 2000 in Formula Ford serie (cars up to 1998 year). By the end of the season, he took 14th place in the overall classification of the series and won the bronze medal in its class.

In 2003, Protasov took part in the Ukrainian Circuit Championship (class A9) and took second place. A year later, he took part in a test drive of the Formula Renault 2000 Germany, but then decided to concentrate on his rallying career.

=== Rally ===
==== Ukrainian Rally Championship ====
Protasov's rallying career started in 1999 with performances as a co-driver (navigator) along with his father, Leonid Protasov. Their first race brought success to the family tandem – victory in the first round of the Ukrainian Rally Championship, rally "Stolitsa" (Lada Samara, A9 class). Starting from the next race, the crew changed Lada on Ford Escort RS 2000, but in the remaining races of the season they never again manage to finish. For some time, he switched his attention to circuit races, but in 2002 returned to the rally already as a driver. Since then, the only exception was the rally "Moldova" 2007, where Protasov was a navigator in the crew of his friend Yuri Yanovsky.

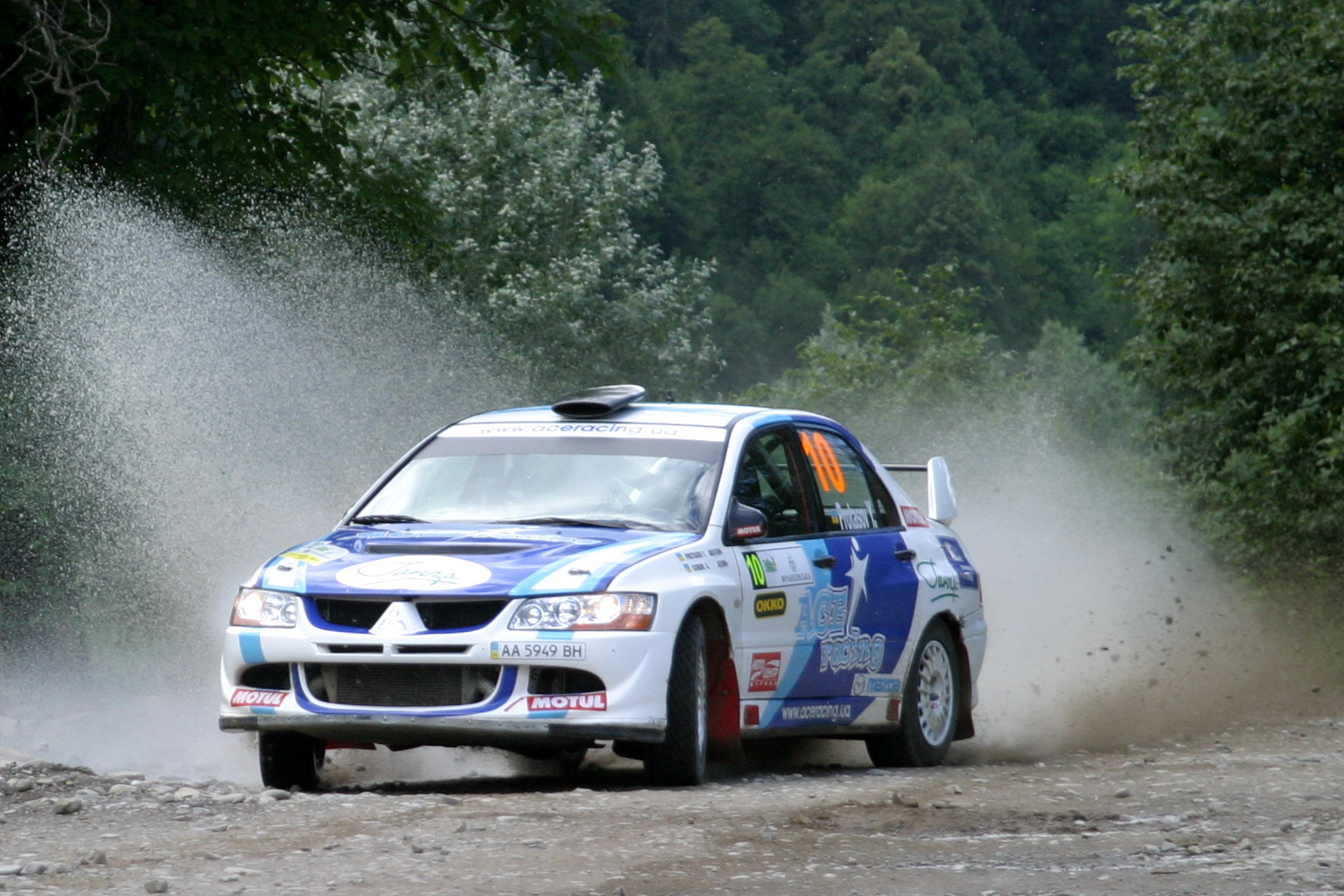
Yuriy Protasov – Alexander Gorbik, Rally Trembita 2007

First, Protasov's steps as a professional rally driver was helped by his family friend, businessman and motor sport enthusiast Taras Chernukha, who became the co-driver of the crew for the next four seasons. During this period, the crew mastered the discipline systematically changing cars. Another Lada Samara (season 2002) was again replaced by Ford Escort RS 2000 (2003), followed by Mitsubishi Lancer Evolution (2004), and finally, Subaru Impreza (2005). Exactly on this car crew achieves the greatest success in their joint career, winning the overall classification in prestigious Life Yalta Rally. In fact, it became an extreme point of joint performances of Protasov and Chernukha – at the end of 2005 Taras retired as a navigator.

In search of a new partner, Protasov referred to Alexander Skochik, and they – without much success – hold Ukrainian Rally Championship 2006. However, for the continuation of a serious career, Protasov need the more professional co-driver – and he invites Alexander Gorbik, former navigator of Yuriy's main rival, Olexandr Saliuk Jr. In a bitter struggle, Protasov firstly gained bronze medals of the Ukrainian Rally Championship in 2007, and then becomes the absolute champion of Ukraine in 2008.

At the same time, close cooperation between Protasov and Ace Racing team beggan, which later transformed into the Darnitsa Motorsport team. The squad set the extremely high goals, so after winning the national championship Protasov decreased his appearance in Ukrainian rallies. From 2009 to 2014, he started only three times at home, fully devoting all his attention to performances on the international competitions.

==== European Rally Championship ====
The next step in the Protasov's career is European Rally Championship, where he made his debut in June 2008 at a Rajd Polski. After spending a few races with the Ukrainian Kirill Nesvit and Pole Lukasz Wronski, Protasov returned to collaboration with Adrian Aftanaziv. After overcoming a series of failures and retirements from the road, the crew sought the first major international victory, winning the Greek Rally Elpa 2010. The result of the season was 51 points and tenth place in the overall classification of the European Championship.

==== World Rally Championship ====
Till 2011, Protasov – the constant participant of the World Rally Championship. The 2011 season could be called a warm up (crew Protasov – Aftanaziv spent only three races, while rising to the podium in Sweden). But in the 2012 Protasov, again co-working with Kyrylo Nesvit, involves in a serious fight for the Subaru Trophy established by the Belgian team Symtech Racing. Prize for winning the trophy, which Protasov gains, was the five rounds of the WRC 2013 on the Subaru Impreza fully paid by Symtech.

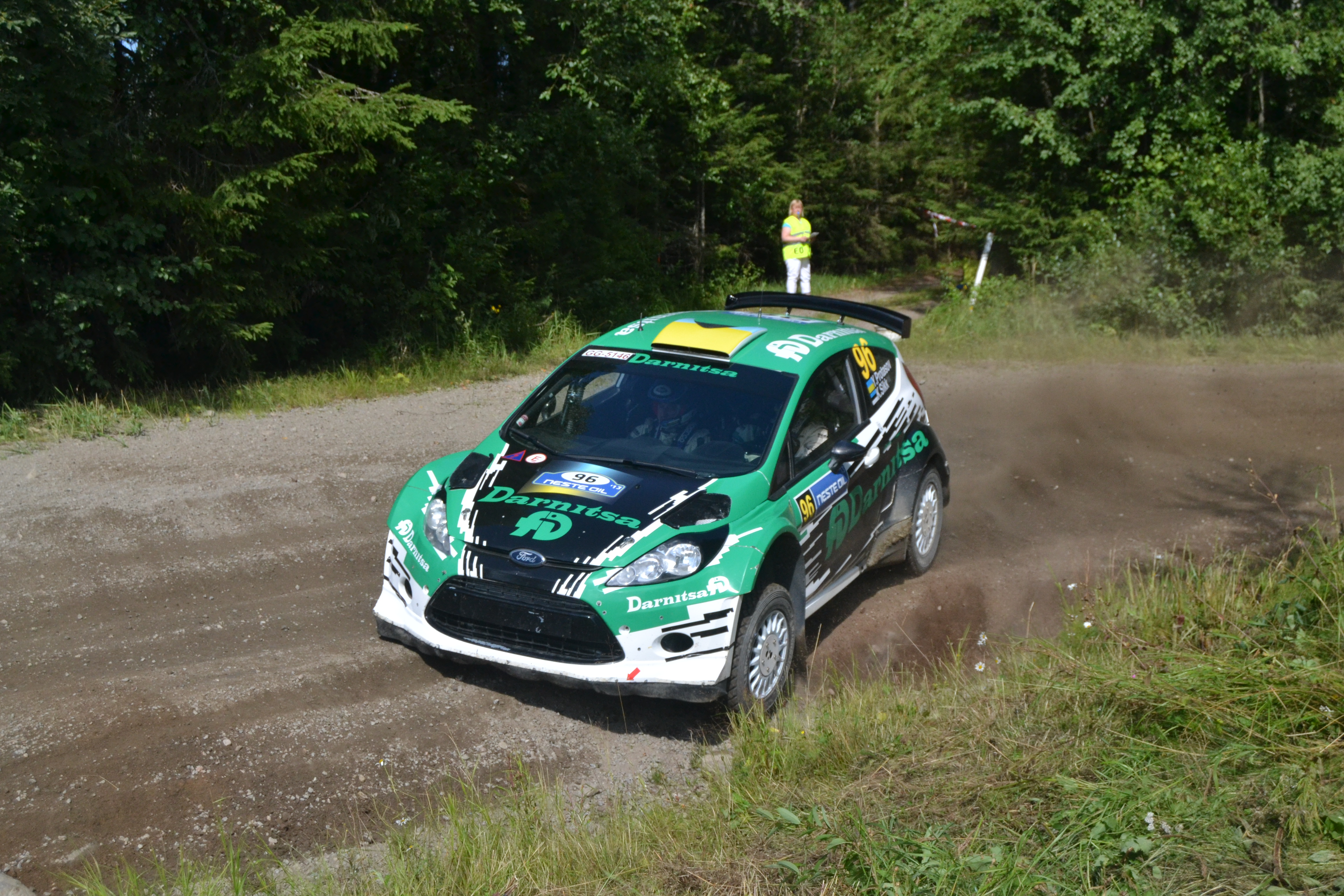
Yuriy Protasov – Kuldar Sikk, Rally Finland 2013

Obtained the gained right in the first five rounds of the championship, Protasov and his new co-driver, Estonian Kuldar Sikk, change to a more powerful cars – Ford Fiesta RRC and the Ford Fiesta R5. Smart tactics and successful strategy allow the crew to perform well in the WRC 2 and, climbing the podium in three of the seven scoring events, to win the "bronze" of the world championship.

In 2014, Protasov began with a new co-driver – now it's Ukrainian Pavlo Cherepin. Brilliant victories in the Monte Carlo Rally and the Rally Mexico, combined with confident performances in Sweden and Italy, allow the crew to get the top-three in the WRC 2 in one round until the end of the season. But at the final round in Wales two rivals, Nasser Al-Attiyah and Jari Ketomaa moved Protasov to fourth place.

The 2015 WRC season started for Protasov and Cherepin with the brand new car – Citroen DS3 WRC prepared by D-Max Racing. Their debut race was a struggle, and after that, crew changes car back to Ford Fiesta RS WRC. The second WRC round in Sweden becomes historical for Protasov: setting the best time overall on special stage 6, he became the first Ukrainian driver able to make it.

On the next rounds of Championship in Mexico and Argentina, Protasov and Cherepin returned to Ford Fiesta RRC. Both times heading the WRC 2, the crew managed only to finish outside top-three due to technical problems (engine overheating in Mexico and broken suspension in Argentina). The luck came back in Italy where the crew finally won the WRC 2 round with famous Paolo Andreucci second and Jan Kopecky third. Spirited by this result, Protasov became third in Finland and Germany and second in Australia, getting the record-breaking for him four podiums in row.

== Career results ==
=== WRC results ===
Year	Entrant	Car	1	2	3	4	5	6	7	8	9	10	11	12	13	WDC	Pts
2011	Darnitsa Motorsport	Mitsubishi Lancer Evo X	SWE; 19	MEX	POR; Ret	JOR	ITA	ARG; 19	GRE	FIN	GER	AUS	FRA	ESP	GBR	NC	0
2012	Yuriy Protasov	Subaru Impreza WRX STi	MON	SWE	MEX	POR; 19	ARG	GRE; 13	NZL		GER; 26	GBR	FRA; 41	ITA; 13	ESP; 28	NC	0
2012	Yuriy Protasov	Citroën DS3 R3T								FIN; 46						NC	0
2013	Symtech Racing	Subaru Impreza STi R4	MON; 12	SWE; 15	MEX; 18	POR; 21	ARG; 18									NC	0
2013	MM Motorsport	Ford Fiesta RRC						GRE; 12	ITA; Ret	FIN; 15						NC	0
2013	MM Motorsport	Ford Fiesta R5									GER; 12	AUS; 11	FRA	ESP; Ret	GBR; Ret	NC	0
2014	Darnitsa Motorsport	Ford Fiesta R5	MON; 10	SWE; 15	MEX; 10	POR; 31				FIN; 43						26th	2
2014	Darnitsa Motorsport	Ford Fiesta RRC					ARG; Ret	ITA; 13	POL			AUS; 13			GBR; 20	26th	2
2014	M-Sport WRT	Ford Fiesta RS WRC									GER; 11		FRA; 16	ESP; 11		26th	2
2015	D-Max Racing	Citroën DS3 WRC	MON; 16													15th	8
2015	Yuriy Protasov	Ford Fiesta RS WRC		SWE; 9												15th	8
2015	Yuriy Protasov	Ford Fiesta RRC			MEX; 13	ARG; 13	POR	ITA; 7	POL	FIN; 13		AUS; 11		ESP; 14	GBR; 36	15th	8
2015	Yuriy Protasov	Ford Fiesta R5									GER; 15		FRA; 20			15th	8
2018	Go+Cars Atlas Ward	Citroën DS3 R3T Max	MON	SWE; 32	MEX	FRA	ARG	POR	ITA	FIN	GER	TUR	GBR	ESP	AUS	NC	0

==== PWRC results ====
Year	Entrant	Car	1	2	3	4	5	6	7	Pos.	Points
2011	Darnitsa Motorsport	Mitsubishi Lancer Evo IX	SWE; 2	POR; Ret	ARG; 9	FIN; DNS	AUS	ESP	GBR	NC†	0†

† Excluded from Championship

==== WRC-2 results ====
Year	Entrant	Car	1	2	3	4	5	6	7	8	9	10	11	12	13	Pos.	Points
2013	Symtech Racing	Subaru Impreza STi R4	MON; 3	SWE; 4	MEX; 5	POR	ARG; 5									3rd	83
2013	MM Motorsport	Ford Fiesta RRC						GRE; 2	ITA; Ret	FIN	GER					3rd	83
2013	MM Motorsport	Ford Fiesta R5										AUS; 2	FRA	ESP	GBR	3rd	83
2014	Yuriy Protasov	Ford Fiesta R5	MON; 1	SWE; 5	MEX; 1	POR; 14										4th	90
2014	Yuriy Protasov	Ford Fiesta RRC					ARG; Ret	ITA; 3	POL	FIN	GER	AUS; 3	FRA	ESP	GBR	4th	90
2015	Yuriy Protasov	Ford Fiesta RRC	MON	SWE	MEX; 5	ARG; 4	POR	ITA; 1	POL	FIN; 3	GER	AUS; 2	FRA	ESP; 5	GBR; 13	2nd	90

==== WRC-3 results ====
Year	Entrant	Car	1	2	3	4	5	6	7	8	9	10	11	12	13	Pos.	Points
2018	Go+Cars Atlas Ward	Citroën DS3 R3T Max	MON	SWE; 6	MEX	FRA	ARG	POR	ITA	FIN	GER	TUR	GBR	ESP	AUS	18th	8

=== Podiums ===
#	Rally	Season	Class	Pos.	Co-driver	Car
1	Rally Sweden	2011	PWRC	2	(Ukraine) Adrian Aftanasiv	Mitsubishi Lancer Evo X
2	Rally de Portugal	2012	3	1	(Ukraine) Kyrylo Nesvit	Subaru Impreza STi
3	(Greece) Acropolis Rally	2012	3	1	(Ukraine) Kyrylo Nesvit	Subaru Impreza STi
4	(Italy) Rally d'Italia	2012	3	1	(Ukraine) Kyrylo Nesvit	Subaru Impreza STi
5	(Monaco) Monte Carlo Rally	2013	WRC 2	3	(Estonia) Kuldar Sikk	Subaru Impreza STi R4
6	Rally Mexico	2013	2	2	(Estonia) Kuldar Sikk	Subaru Impreza STi R4
7	Rally Argentina	2013	2	3	(Estonia) Kuldar Sikk	Subaru Impreza STi R4
8	(Greece) Acropolis Rally	2013	WRC 2	2	(Estonia) Kuldar Sikk	Subaru Impreza STi R4
9	Rally Australia	2013	WRC 2	2	(Estonia) Kuldar Sikk	Ford Fiesta R5
10	(Monaco) Monte Carlo Rally	2014	WRC 2	1	(Ukraine) Pavlo Cherepin	Ford Fiesta R5
11	Rally Mexico	2014	WRC 2	1	(Ukraine) Pavlo Cherepin	Ford Fiesta R5
12	(Italy) Rally d'Italia	2014	WRC 2	3	(Ukraine) Pavlo Cherepin	Ford Fiesta RRC
13	Rally Australia	2014	WRC 2	3	(Ukraine) Pavlo Cherepin	Ford Fiesta RRC
14	(Italy) Rally d'Italia	2015	WRC 2	1	(Ukraine) Pavlo Cherepin	Ford Fiesta RRC
15	Rally Finland	2015	WRC 2	3	(Ukraine) Pavlo Cherepin	Ford Fiesta RRC
16	(Germany) Rallye Deutschland	2015	RC 2	3	(Ukraine) Pavlo Cherepin	Ford Fiesta R5
17	Rally Australia	2015	WRC 2	2	(Ukraine) Pavlo Cherepin	Ford Fiesta RRC

== Interesting facts ==
Protasov is the first Ukrainian driver to have won a WRC special stage when he finished fastest on SS6 of 2015 Rally Sweden.

Three navigators of Protasov – Olexandr Gorbik, Adrian Aftanaziv and Pavlo Cherepin – started their rallying careers as the co-drivers of Protasov's main rival, Oleksandr Saliuk.
