= Nicolás Fuchs =

Peruvian rally driver (born 1982)

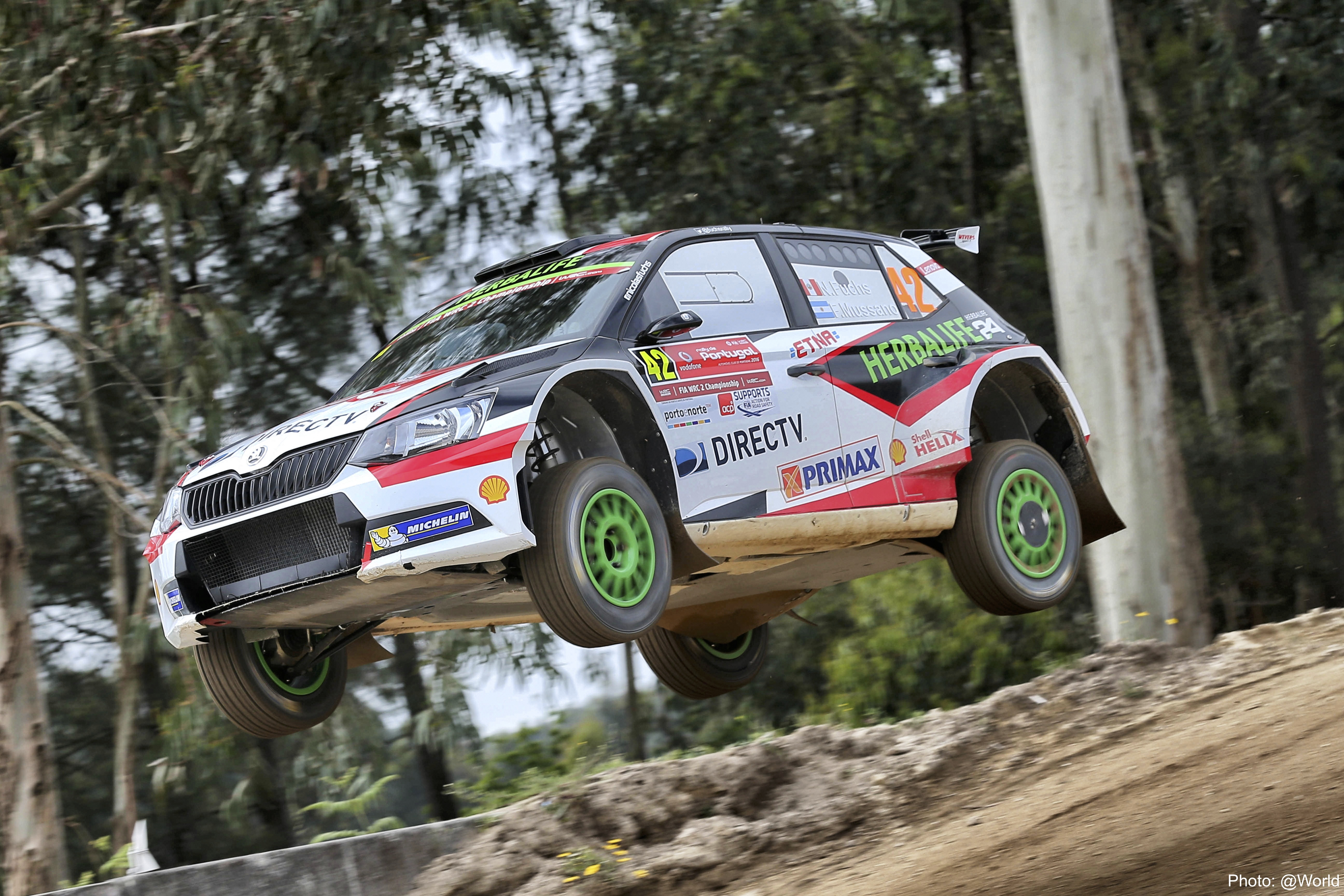
- Fuchs during the 2016 Rally Portugal.

Personal information
- Nationality: Peruvian
- Born: 10 August 1982 (age 44)

World Rally Championship record
- Years active: 2009–2016
- Rallies: 42
- Championships: 0
- Rally wins: 0
- Podiums: 0
- Stage wins: 0
- Total points: 4
- First rally: 2009 Rally Argentina
- Last rally: 2016 Rally Australia

Nicolás Fuchs Sierlecki (born 10 August 1982) is a Peruvian rally driver. A three-time winner of the Caminos del Inca Rally, he has been racing in the WRC since the 2009 season.

== Career results ==
=== WRC results ===
Year	Entrant	Car	1	2	3	4	5	6	7	8	9	10	11	12	13	WDC	Pts
2009	Barattero	Subaru Impreza STi N14	IRE	NOR	CYP	POR	ARG; 11	ITA	GRE	POL	FIN	AUS	ESP	GBR		NC	0
2010	FRT Team	Mitsubishi Lancer Evo IX	SWE	MEX; 12	JOR	TUR	NZL	POR	BUL	FIN	GER	JPN	FRA	ESP	GBR	NC	0
2011	Nicolás Fuchs	Mitsubishi Lancer Evo X	SWE; 21	MEX	POR; Ret	JOR	ITA	ARG; 12	GRE	FIN; Ret	GER	AUS	FRA	ESP; 31	GBR; 16	NC	0
2012	Nicolás Fuchs	Mitsubishi Lancer Evo IX	MON	SWE	MEX; 12	POR										NC	0
2012	Nicolás Fuchs	Mitsubishi Lancer Evo X					ARG; 13									NC	0
2012	Nicolás Fuchs	Subaru Impreza WRX STi						GRE; Ret	NZL	FIN	GER; 24	GBR	FRA	ITA; 14	ESP; 36	NC	0
2013	Nicolás Fuchs	Mitsubishi Lancer Evo X	MON	SWE; 16		POR; 15		GRE; 16	ITA; 14	FIN	GER	AUS	FRA	ESP; 18	GBR	NC	0
2013	Nicolás Fuchs	Mitsubishi Lancer Evo IX			MEX; 13		ARG; 15									NC	0
2014	Nicolás Fuchs	Ford Fiesta RRC	MON	SWE	MEX; 18		ARG; 11									NC	0
2014	Nicolás Fuchs	Ford Fiesta R5				POR; 23		ITA; Ret	POL; 17	FIN	GER	AUS	FRA	ESP; 21	GBR; 23	NC	0
2015	Nicolás Fuchs	Ford Fiesta R5	MON	SWE	MEX; 9		POR; 17	ITA; 15	POL; 20	FIN; Ret	GER	AUS	FRA	ESP		27th	2
2015	Drive Dmack	Ford Fiesta R5				ARG; Ret									GBR; 18	27th	2
2016	Wevers Sport	Škoda Fabia R5	MON	SWE	MEX; 14	ARG; 10	POR; 10	ITA; Ret	POL; 20	FIN	GER	FRA	ESP	GBR; 21	AUS; 11	24th	2

==== PWRC results ====
Year	Entrant	Car	1	2	3	4	5	6	7	8	Pos.	Pts
2011	Nicolás Fuchs	Mitsubishi Lancer Evo X	SWE; 3	POR; Ret	ARG; 4	FIN; Ret	AUS	ESP; 6	GBR; 3		5th	50
2012	Nicolás Fuchs	Mitsubishi Lancer Evo IX	MON	MEX; 2							6th	73
2012	Nicolás Fuchs	Mitsubishi Lancer Evo X			ARG; 2						6th	73
2012	Nicolás Fuchs	Subaru Impreza WRX STi				GRE; Ret	NZL	GER; 5	ITA; 1	ESP; 9	6th	73

==== WRC-2 results ====
Year	Entrant	Car	1	2	3	4	5	6	7	8	9	10	11	12	13	Pos.	Pts
2013	Nicolás Fuchs	Mitsubishi Lancer Evo X	MON	SWE; 5		POR; 4		GRE; 6	ITA; 4	FIN	GER	AUS	FRA	ESP; 5	GBR	2nd	78
2013	Nicolás Fuchs	Mitsubishi Lancer Evo IX			MEX; 2		ARG; 2									2nd	78
2014	Nicolás Fuchs	Ford Fiesta RRC	MON	SWE	MEX; 6		ARG; 2									9th	46
2014	Nicolás Fuchs	Ford Fiesta R5				POR; 12		ITA; Ret	POL; 6	FIN	GER	AUS	FRA	ESP; 5	GBR; 9	9th	46
2015	Nicolás Fuchs	Ford Fiesta R5	MON	SWE	MEX; 2		POR; 7	ITA; 7	POL; 7	FIN; Ret	GER	AUS	FRA	ESP		12th	44
2015	Drive Dmack	Ford Fiesta R5				ARG; Ret									GBR; 6	12th	44
2016	Wevers Sport	Škoda Fabia R5	MON	SWE	MEX; 4	ARG; 1	POR; 2	ITA; Ret	POL; 8	FIN	GER	FRA	ESP	GBR; 7	AUS; 2	6th	83

Sporting positions
Preceded by Ricardo Triviño	NACAM Rally Champion; 2010	Succeeded by Raúl Orlandini Griswold
