= 2014 WRC2 Championship =

The 2014 FIA WRC2 Championship was the second season of WRC2, a rallying championship organised and governed by the Fédération Internationale de l'Automobile, running in support of the World Rally Championship. The Championship was open to cars complying with R4, R5, Super 2000 and Group N regulations. The Championship is composed by thirteen Rallies, and Drivers and Teams must nominate a maximum of seven event. The best six results were counted towards the championship.

Former Formula One driver Robert Kubica did not return to defend his 2013 title as he joined the sport's premier category.

The Title went to Nasser Al-Attiyah finishing six the last event, winning the championship by three points over Jari Ketomaa (who won the event). Lorenzo Bertelli finished the championship in third position.

== Calendar ==
The 2014 calendar was announced at a meeting of the FIA World Motor Sport Council in Croatia on 27 September 2013. The 2014 championship was contested over thirteen rounds in Europe, the Americas and Oceania.

Round	Dates	Rally name	Rally headquarters	Surface
1	16–18 January	(Monaco) Monte Carlo Rally	Gap, Hautes-Alpes, France	Mixed
2	5–8 February	Rally Sweden	Hagfors, Värmland	Snow
3	6–9 March	Rally Mexico	León, Guanajuato	Gravel
4	3–6 April	Rally de Portugal	Faro, Algarve	Gravel
5	8–11 May	Rally Argentina	Villa Carlos Paz, Córdoba	Gravel
6	6–8 June	(Italy) Rally Italia Sardegna	Alghero, Sardinia	Gravel
7	27–29 June	Rally Poland	Mikołajki, Warmia-Masuria	Gravel
8	31 July–3 August	Rally Finland	Jyväskylä, Keski-Suomi	Gravel
9	22–24 August	(Germany) Rallye Deutschland	Trier, Rhineland-Palatinate	Tarmac
10	12–14 September	Rally Australia	Coffs Harbour, New South Wales	Gravel
11	3–5 October	Rallye de France Alsace	Strasbourg, Alsace	Tarmac
12	24–26 October	(Spain) Rally de Catalunya	Salou, Tarragona	Mixed
13	14–16 November	(United Kingdom) Wales Rally GB	Deeside, Flintshire	Gravel

=== Calendar changes ===
- Rally Australia and Rally New Zealand abandoned the event-sharing arrangement established in 2008 that saw each event host a round of the championship every other year. After hosting an event in 2013, Rally Australia remains on the calendar throughout 2014 and 2015 before the arrangement is due to be renegotiated.
- The Rallye Monte Carlo relocated its base from Valence in the French province of Rhône-Alpes to the town of Gap in the neighbouring province of Hautes-Alpes.
- The 2014 calendar saw the Rally of Poland return to the championship for the first time since 2009. The event also crossed the border into Lithuania for one day of competition. Its inclusion came at the expense of the Acropolis Rally, which was removed after struggling with its financial obligations to the championship. The Acropolis Rally later moved to the European Rally Championship for the 2014 season. The rallies of Brazil and China had also been considered for inclusion on the WRC calendar before the FIA approved of the Rally of Poland.

== Teams and drivers ==
Entrant	Driver	Co-driver	Car	Class	Tyre	Rounds
(United Kingdom) M-Sport World Rally Team	(Ukraine) Yuriy Protasov	(Ukraine) Pavlo Cherepin	Ford Fiesta R5	R5	MI	1–5
(United Kingdom) M-Sport World Rally Team	(Ukraine) Yuriy Protasov	(Ukraine) Pavlo Cherepin	Ford Fiesta RRC	S	MI	10
(United Kingdom) M-Sport World Rally Team	(Ukraine) Yuriy Protasov	(Ukraine) Pavlo Cherepin	Ford Fiesta RRC	S	P	6
(United Kingdom) M-Sport World Rally Team	(Peru) Nicolás Fuchs	(Argentina) Fernando Mussano	Ford Fiesta RRC	S	DM	3, 5
(United Kingdom) M-Sport World Rally Team	(Peru) Nicolás Fuchs	(Argentina) Fernando Mussano	Ford Fiesta R5	R5	DM	6–7, 12–13
(United Kingdom) M-Sport World Rally Team	(Sweden) Pontus Tidemand	(Norway) Ola Floene	Ford Fiesta R5	R5	MI	4
(United Kingdom) M-Sport World Rally Team	(Sweden) Pontus Tidemand	(Sweden) Emil Axelsson	Ford Fiesta R5	R5	MI	9
(United Kingdom) M-Sport World Rally Team	(Sweden) Pontus Tidemand	(Sweden) Patrik Barth	Ford Fiesta R5	R5	MI	11
(United Kingdom) M-Sport World Rally Team	(France) Quentin Gilbert	(Belgium) Renaud Jamoul	Ford Fiesta R5	R5	P	11
(United Kingdom) M-Sport World Rally Team	(France) Quentin Gilbert	(Belgium) Renaud Jamoul	Ford Fiesta R5	R5	DM	13
(Austria) Stohl Racing	(Germany) Armin Kremer	(Germany) Klaus Wicha	Ford Fiesta R5	R5	P	1
(Austria) Baumschlager Rallye & Racing	(Germany) Armin Kremer	(Germany) Klaus Wicha	Škoda Fabia S2000	S	P	9
(Italy) www.Rallyproject.com srl	(Italy) Max Rendina	(Italy) Mario Pizzuti	Mitsubishi Lancer Evo X	N	P	1–7, 10
(Belgium) J-Motorsport	(Greece) Jourdan Serderidis	(Belgium) Morgane Rose	Ford Fiesta R5	R5	P	1–2
(Belgium) J-Motorsport	(Greece) Jourdan Serderidis	(Belgium) Frédéric Miclotte	Ford Fiesta R5	R5	P	7
(Belgium) J-Motorsport	(Greece) Jourdan Serderidis	(Belgium) Frédéric Miclotte	Ford Fiesta R5	R5	DM	10
(Belgium) J-Motorsport	(Greece) Jourdan Serderidis	(Belgium) Frédéric Miclotte	Ford Fiesta R5	R5	MI	11–13
(France) Team 2B Yacco	(France) Julien Maurin	(France) Nicolas Klinger	Ford Fiesta RRC	S	P	1, 4
(France) Team 2B Yacco	(France) Julien Maurin	(France) Nicolas Klinger	Ford Fiesta R5	R5	P	6, 9, 12
(United Kingdom) CA1 Sport Ltd	(Republic of Ireland) Robert Barrable	(United Kingdom) Stuart Loudon	Ford Fiesta R5	R5	DM	1, 4
(United Kingdom) CA1 Sport Ltd	(Republic of Ireland) Robert Barrable	(United Kingdom) Stuart Loudon	Ford Fiesta R5	R5	MI	12
(Italy) FWRT s.r.l.	(Italy) Lorenzo Bertelli	(Italy) Mitia Dotta	Ford Fiesta R5	R5	P	1–2, 13
(Italy) FWRT s.r.l.	(Italy) Lorenzo Bertelli	(Italy) Mitia Dotta	Ford Fiesta RRC	S	P	3, 5–6, 10
(Saudi Arabia) Yazeed Racing	(Saudi Arabia) Yazeed Al-Rajhi	(United Kingdom) Michael Orr	Ford Fiesta RRC	S	MI	2, 6–8, 10
(Saudi Arabia) Yazeed Racing	(United Kingdom) Matthew Wilson	(United Kingdom) Scott Martin	Ford Fiesta RRC	S	MI	13
(United Kingdom) Drive DMACK	(Finland) Jari Ketomaa	(Finland) Kaj Lindström	Ford Fiesta R5	R5	DM	2, 4–5, 7–8, 10, 13
(United Kingdom) Drive DMACK	(Sweden) Fredrik Åhlin	(Norway) Morten Erik Abrahamsen	Ford Fiesta R5	R5	DM	2, 4
(United Kingdom) Drive DMACK	(Estonia) Ott Tänak	(Estonia) Raigo Mõlder	Ford Fiesta R5	R5	DM	3, 5–10
(United Kingdom) Drive DMACK	(France) Quentin Gilbert	(Belgium) Renaud Jamoul	Ford Fiesta R5	R5	DM	3, 5–6
(United Kingdom) Drive DMACK	(Norway) Eyvind Brynildsen	(Sweden) Anders Fredriksson	Ford Fiesta RRC	S	DM	8
(Norway) Anders Grøndal Rally Team	(Norway) Anders Grøndal	(Norway) Roger Eilertsen	Subaru Impreza WRX STi	N	P	2
(Ukraine) Eurolamp World Rally Team	(Ukraine) Valeriy Gorban	(Ukraine) Volodymyr Korsia	MINI John Cooper Works S2000	S	P	2, 12–13
(Ukraine) Eurolamp World Rally Team	(Ukraine) Valeriy Gorban	(Ukraine) Volodymyr Korsia	MINI John Cooper Works S2000	S	MI	4, 6–8
(Finland) Printsport Racing	(Estonia) Karl Kruuda	(Estonia) Martin Järveoja	Ford Fiesta S2000	S	MI	2, 4, 8, 12–13
(Hungary) Tagai Racing Technology	(Estonia) Karl Kruuda	(Estonia) Martin Järveoja	Peugeot 208 T16 R5	R5	MI	6–7
(Italy) Porto Cervo Racing Team	(Italy) Giuseppe Dettori	(Italy) Carlo Pisano	Mitsubishi Lancer Evo IX	N	DM	2, 6
(Italy) G.B. Motors	(Italy) Gianluca Linari	(Italy) Nicola Arena	Subaru Impreza WRX STi	N	P	2
(Italy) G.B. Motors	(Italy) Gianluca Linari	(Italy) Nicola Arena	Subaru Impreza WRX STi	N	DM	3, 6
(Italy) G.B. Motors	(Italy) Gianluca Linari	(Italy) Danilo Fappani	Subaru Impreza WRX STi	N	DM	5
ABR Paraguay by Astra	(Paraguay) Augusto Bestard	(Paraguay) Fernando Mendonca	Mitsubishi Lancer Evo X	N	P	3
ABR Paraguay by Astra	(Paraguay) Augusto Bestard	(Paraguay) Enrique Fratta	Mitsubishi Lancer Evo X	N	DM	5
(Qatar) Nasser Al-Attiyah	(Qatar) Nasser Al-Attiyah	(Italy) Giovanni Bernacchini	Ford Fiesta RRC	S	MI	4–6, 9, 12–13
(Spain) RMC Motorsport	(Peru) Nicolás Fuchs	(Argentina) Fernando Mussano	Ford Fiesta R5	R5	DM	4
(Spain) RMC Motorsport	(Argentina) Juan Carlos Alonso	(Argentina) Juan Pablo Monasterolo	Mitsubishi Lancer Evo X	N	DM	4, 6–8, 12
(Spain) RMC Motorsport	(Argentina) Juan Carlos Alonso	(Argentina) Juan Pablo Monasterolo	Mitsubishi Lancer Evo IX	N	DM	5
(Spain) RMC Motorsport	(Chile) Ramón Torres	(Argentina) José Díaz	Mitsubishi Lancer Evo IX	N	DM	5
(Spain) RMC Motorsport	(Chile) Ramón Torres	(Argentina) José Díaz	Mitsubishi Lancer Evo X	N	DM	6–7
(Ukraine) AT Rally Team	(Portugal) Bernardo Sousa	(Portugal) Hugo Magalhães	Ford Fiesta RRC	S	P	4, 6–7, 9, 11–13
(Ukraine) AT Rally Team	(Estonia) Martin Kangur	(Estonia) Andres Ots	Ford Fiesta S2000	S	MI	4
(Ukraine) AT Rally Team	(Estonia) Martin Kangur	(Poland) Paweł Drahan	Ford Fiesta S2000	S	MI	6
(Ukraine) AT Rally Team	(Estonia) Martin Kangur	(Estonia) Kuldar Sikk	Ford Fiesta S2000	S	MI	7, 13
(Indonesia) Bosowa Rally Team	(Indonesia) Subhan Aksa	(Italy) Nicola Arena	Ford Fiesta RRC	S	MI	4, 10
(Indonesia) Bosowa Rally Team	(United Kingdom) David Bogie	(United Kingdom) Kevin Rae	Ford Fiesta R5	R5	DM	13
(United Arab Emirates) Skydive Dubai Rally Team	(United Arab Emirates) Rashid Al Ketbi	(Germany) Karina Hepperle	Ford Fiesta R5	R5	DM	4, 6–7, 9, 12
(Germany) Puma Rally Team	(Qatar) Abdulaziz Al-Kuwari	(Republic of Ireland) Killian Duffy	Ford Fiesta RRC	S	MI	4–6
(Italy) A-Style Team	(United Kingdom) Martin McCormack	(Republic of Ireland) David Moynihan	Ford Fiesta R5	R5	HK	4, 6
(Italy) A-Style Team	(United Kingdom) Martin McCormack	(United Kingdom) Phil Clarke	Ford Fiesta R5	R5	HK	9
(Italy) A-Style Team	(United Kingdom) Martin McCormack	(United Kingdom) James Morgan	Ford Fiesta R5	R5	HK	11
(Italy) A-Style Team	(United Kingdom) Martin McCormack	(Republic of Ireland) John Higgins	Ford Fiesta S2000	S	HK	13
(Italy) Vomero Racing	(Italy) Marco Vallario	(Italy) Antonio Pascale	Mitsubishi Lancer Evo X	N	DM	4, 6, 8
Sirbb Kuwait	(Kuwait) Salah Bin Eidan	(Italy) Alex Gelsomino	Ford Fiesta R5	R5	MI	4
Sirbb Kuwait	(Kuwait) Salah Bin Eidan	(Italy) Alex Gelsomino	Ford Fiesta R5	R5	DM	6–8
(Paraguay) Saba Competicion	(Paraguay) Gustavo Saba	(Argentina) Diego Cagnotti	Škoda Fabia S2000	S	DM	5
(Argentina) Barattero Motorsport	(Paraguay) Diego Domínguez	(Argentina) Edgardo Galindo	Ford Fiesta R5	R5	DM	5
MZR Paraguay	(Paraguay) Miguel Zaldivar	(Paraguay) Fernando Mendonca	Ford Fiesta R5	R5	DM	5
MZR Paraguay	(United Kingdom) Tom Cave	(United Kingdom) Craig Parry	Ford Fiesta R5	R5	DM	13
(Belgium) Top Teams by MY Racing	(France) Sébastien Chardonnet	(France) Thibault de la Haye	Citroën DS3 R5	R5	MI	6–9, 11–12
(Estonia) Kaur Motorsport	(Estonia) Egon Kaur	(Estonia) Erik Lepikson	Ford Fiesta R5	R5	DM	6
(Poland) C-Rally	(Poland) Jarosław Kołtun	(Poland) Ireneusz Pleskot	Ford Fiesta R5	R5	MI	7, 11
(Poland) C-Rally	(Poland) Jarosław Kołtun	(Poland) Ireneusz Pleskot	Ford Fiesta R5	R5	HK	13
(Estonia) MM Motorsport	(Ukraine) Oleksiy Kikireshko	(Estonia) Kuldar Sikk	Ford Fiesta R5	R5	DM	8
(Italy) BAS Motorsport Srl	(Italy) Mario Pizzuti	(Italy) Max Rendina	Mitsubishi Lancer Evo X	N	P	8
(Italy) BAS Motorsport Srl	(Mexico) Benito Guerra	(Spain) Borja Rozada	Mitsubishi Lancer Evo X	N	MI	12
(Italy) Top Run Srl	(France) Johan Heloïse	(Italy) Roberto Mometti	Subaru Impreza WRX STi	N	P	11–12
(France) PH Sport	(France) Stéphane Lefebvre	(France) Thomas Dubois	Citroën DS3 R5	R5	MI	12
(France) PH Sport	(France) Stéphane Lefebvre	(Belgium) Stéphane Prévot	Citroën DS3 R5	R5	MI	13

Icon	Class
R4	Classification within Group R
R5	Classification within Group R
S	Super 2000
N	Group N

=== Driver changes ===
- Reigning WRC3 champion Sébastien Chardonnet moved up to the WRC-2.
- Jari Ketomaa took part in his first full season of competition, having made regular guest appearances in a variety of WRC championships for the past decade.
- Kristian Sohlberg returned to the World Rally Championship after a six-year absence. Sohlberg drove a Ford Fiesta R5 prepared by M-Sport and run by Autotek Motorsport. He last competed at World level in the now-defunct Production World Rally Championship in 2007.
- After losing his seat with the M-Sport World Rally Team in 2013, Ott Tänak alternated between contesting the WRC-2 season and competing in the WRC at rallies which are not nominated for points.

== Regulation changes ==
- All competitors registered in the Championships–WRC, WRC-2, WRC-3 and the Junior WRC—were obliged to use a colour-coded windscreen sticker to distinguish its category.
- Drivers were no longer assigned permanent numbers, except upon request.

== Rally summaries ==
Round	Rally name	Podium finishers					Statistics		
Round	Rally name	Pos.	Driver	Team	Time	Stages	Length	Starters	Finishers
1	(Monaco) Monte Carlo Rally (15–20 January) — Results and report	1	(Ukraine) Yuriy Protasov (Ukraine) Pavlo Cherepin	(United Kingdom) M-Sport World Rally Team (Ford Fiesta R5)	4:20:57.5	(15)^{1a} 14	(383,88 km)^{1b} 360,48 km	7	6
1	(Monaco) Monte Carlo Rally (15–20 January) — Results and report	2	(Italy) Lorenzo Bertelli (Italy) Mitia Dotta	(Italy) FWRT s.r.l. (Ford Fiesta R5)	4:28:47.9	(15)^{1a} 14	(383,88 km)^{1b} 360,48 km	7	6
1	(Monaco) Monte Carlo Rally (15–20 January) — Results and report	3	(Republic of Ireland) Robert Barrable (United Kingdom) Stuart Loudon	(United Kingdom) CA1 Sport Ltd (Ford Fiesta R5)	4:30:22.3	(15)^{1a} 14	(383,88 km)^{1b} 360,48 km	7	6
2	Rally Sweden (5–8 February) — Results and report	1	(Estonia) Karl Kruuda (Estonia) Martin Järveoja	(Finland) Printsport Racing (Ford Fiesta S2000)	3:14:40.2	(24); 23	(323,54 km); 312,22 km	10	8
2	Rally Sweden (5–8 February) — Results and report	2	(Finland) Jari Ketomaa (Finland) Kaj Lindström	(United Kingdom) Drive DMACK (Ford Fiesta R5)	3:14:42.5	(24); 23	(323,54 km); 312,22 km	10	8
2	Rally Sweden (5–8 February) — Results and report	3	(Sweden) Fredrik Åhlin (Norway) Morten Erik Abrahamsen	(United Kingdom) Drive DMACK (Ford Fiesta R5)	3:15:58.3	(24); 23	(323,54 km); 312,22 km	10	8
3	Rally Mexico (6–9 March) — Results and report	1	(Ukraine) Yuriy Protasov (Ukraine) Pavlo Cherepin	(United Kingdom) M-Sport World Rally Team (Ford Fiesta R5)	4:56:00.0	21	401,77 km	8	7
3	Rally Mexico (6–9 March) — Results and report	2	(Italy) Lorenzo Bertelli (Italy) Mitia Dotta	(Italy) FWRT s.r.l. (Ford Fiesta R5)	5:19:43.9	21	401,77 km	8	7
3	Rally Mexico (6–9 March) — Results and report	3	(Italy) Max Rendina (Italy) Mario Pizzuti	(Italy) www.Rallyproject.com srl (Mitsubishi Lancer Evo X)	5:19:59.8	21	401,77 km	8	7
4	Rally de Portugal (3–6 April) — Results and report	1	(Qatar) Nasser Al-Attiyah (Italy) Giovanni Bernacchini	(United Kingdom) Autotek Motorsport (Ford Fiesta RRC)	3:43:35.1	16	339,46 km	20	17
4	Rally de Portugal (3–6 April) — Results and report	2	(Finland) Jari Ketomaa (Finland) Kaj Lindström	(United Kingdom) Drive DMACK (Ford Fiesta R5)	3:43:46.7	16	339,46 km	20	17
4	Rally de Portugal (3–6 April) — Results and report	3	(Sweden) Pontus Tidemand (Norway) Ola Floene	(United Kingdom) M-Sport World Rally Team (Ford Fiesta R5)	3:45:42.1	16	339,46 km	20	17
5	Rally Argentina (8–11 May) — Results and report	1	(Qatar) Nasser Al-Attiyah (Italy) Giovanni Bernacchini	(United Kingdom) Autotek Motorsport (Ford Fiesta RRC)	5:04:35.0	14	405,10 km	16	13
5	Rally Argentina (8–11 May) — Results and report	2	(Peru) Nicolás Fuchs (Argentina) Fernando Mussano	(United Kingdom) M-Sport World Rally Team (Ford Fiesta RRC)	5:10:10.7	14	405,10 km	16	13
5	Rally Argentina (8–11 May) — Results and report	3	(Paraguay) Diego Domínguez (Argentina) Edgardo Galindo	(Argentina) Barattero Motorsport (Ford Fiesta R5)	5:10:25.5	14	405,10 km	16	13
6	(Italy) Rally Italia Sardegna (6–8 June) — Results and report	1	(Italy) Lorenzo Bertelli (Italy) Mitia Dotta	(Italy) FWRT s.r.l. (Ford Fiesta R5)	4:17:59.9	17	364,54 km	22	15
6	(Italy) Rally Italia Sardegna (6–8 June) — Results and report	2	(France) Sébastien Chardonnet (France) Thibault de la Haye	(Belgium) Top Teams by MY Racing (Citroën DS3 R5)	4:20:11.5	17	364,54 km	22	15
6	(Italy) Rally Italia Sardegna (6–8 June) — Results and report	3	(Ukraine) Yuriy Protasov (Ukraine) Pavlo Cherepin	(United Kingdom) M-Sport World Rally Team (Ford Fiesta RRC)	4:23:27.0	17	364,54 km	22	15
7	Rally Poland (27–29 June) — Results and report	1	(Estonia) Ott Tänak (Estonia) Raigo Mõlder	(United Kingdom) Drive DMACK (Ford Fiesta R5)	2:42:12.3	24	336,64 km	15	12
7	Rally Poland (27–29 June) — Results and report	2	(Finland) Jari Ketomaa (Finland) Kaj Lindström	(United Kingdom) Drive DMACK (Ford Fiesta R5)	2:43:50.5	24	336,64 km	15	12
7	Rally Poland (27–29 June) — Results and report	3	(Saudi Arabia) Yazeed Al Rajhi (United Kingdom) Michael Orr	(Saudi Arabia) Yazeed Racing (Ford Fiesta RRC)	2:46:23.5	24	336,64 km	15	12
8	Rally Finland (1–3 August) — Results and report	1	(Estonia) Karl Kruuda (Estonia) Martin Järveoja	(Finland) Printsport Racing (Ford Fiesta S2000)	3:12:07.9	26	360,94 km	10	7
8	Rally Finland (1–3 August) — Results and report	2	(Finland) Jari Ketomaa (Finland) Kaj Lindström	(United Kingdom) Drive DMACK (Ford Fiesta R5)	3:14:16.6	26	360,94 km	10	7
8	Rally Finland (1–3 August) — Results and report	3	(Estonia) Ott Tänak (Estonia) Raigo Mõlder	(United Kingdom) Drive DMACK (Ford Fiesta R5)	3:14:40.1	26	360,94 km	10	7
9	(Germany) Rallye Deutschland (22–24 August) — Results and report	1	(Sweden) Pontus Tidemand (Sweden) Emil Axelsson	(United Kingdom) M-Sport World Rally Team (Ford Fiesta R5)	3:18:55.6	18	324,31 km	9	7
9	(Germany) Rallye Deutschland (22–24 August) — Results and report	2	(Estonia) Ott Tänak (Estonia) Raigo Mõlder	(United Kingdom) Drive DMACK (Ford Fiesta R5)	3:18:57.4	18	324,31 km	9	7
9	(Germany) Rallye Deutschland (22–24 August) — Results and report	3	(Germany) Armin Kremer (Germany) Klaus Wicha	(Austria) Baumschlager Rallye & Racing (Škoda Fabia S2000)	3:20:00.8	18	324,31 km	9	7
10	Rally Australia (12–14 September) — Results and report	1	(Qatar) Nasser Al-Attiyah (Italy) Giovanni Bernacchini	(United Kingdom) Autotek Motorsport (Ford Fiesta RRC)	3:05:11.1	20	304,34 km	9	6
10	Rally Australia (12–14 September) — Results and report	2	(Finland) Jari Ketomaa (Finland) Kaj Lindström	(United Kingdom) Drive DMACK (Ford Fiesta R5)	3:07:01.5	20	304,34 km	9	6
10	Rally Australia (12–14 September) — Results and report	3	(Ukraine) Yuriy Protasov (Ukraine) Pavlo Cherepin	(United Kingdom) M-Sport World Rally Team (Ford Fiesta RRC)	3:07:48.1	20	304,34 km	9	6
11	Rallye de France Alsace (3–5 October) — Results and report	1	(France) Quentin Gilbert (Belgium) Renaud Jamoul	(United Kingdom) M-Sport World Rally Team (Ford Fiesta R5)	2:48:56.8	18	303,63 km	8	7
11	Rallye de France Alsace (3–5 October) — Results and report	2	(Portugal) Bernardo Sousa (Portugal) Hugo Magalhães	(Ukraine) AT Rally Team (Ford Fiesta RRC)	2:49:04.9	18	303,63 km	8	7
11	Rallye de France Alsace (3–5 October) — Results and report	3	(France) Sébastien Chardonnet (France) Thibault de la Haye	(Belgium) Top Teams by MY Racing (Citroën DS3 R5)	2:51:04.1	18	303,63 km	8	7
12	(Spain) Rally de Catalunya (24–26 October) — Results and report	1	(Qatar) Nasser Al-Attiyah (Italy) Giovanni Bernacchini	(United Kingdom) Autotek Motorsport (Ford Fiesta RRC)	3:59:24.4	17	372,96 km	12	8
12	(Spain) Rally de Catalunya (24–26 October) — Results and report	2	(France) Julien Maurin (France) Nicolas Klinger	(France) Team 2B Yacco (Ford Fiesta R5)	3:59:59.4	17	372,96 km	12	8
12	(Spain) Rally de Catalunya (24–26 October) — Results and report	3	(Republic of Ireland) Robert Barrable (United Kingdom) Stuart Loudon	(United Kingdom) CA1 Sport Ltd (Ford Fiesta R5)	4:03:56.9	17	372,96 km	12	8
13	(United Kingdom) Wales Rally GB (14–16 November) — Results and report	1	(Finland) Jari Ketomaa (Finland) Kaj Lindström	(United Kingdom) Drive DMACK (Ford Fiesta R5)	3:14:08.1	17	305,64 km	16	12
13	(United Kingdom) Wales Rally GB (14–16 November) — Results and report	2	(Italy) Lorenzo Bertelli (Italy) Mitia Dotta	(Italy) FWRT s.r.l. (Ford Fiesta R5)	3:15:05.5	17	305,64 km	16	12
13	(United Kingdom) Wales Rally GB (14–16 November) — Results and report	3	(United Kingdom) Matthew Wilson (United Kingdom) Scott Martin	(Saudi Arabia) Yazeed Racing (Ford Fiesta R5)	3:15:25.3	17	305,64 km	16	12

Notes:

- ^1 – The Monte Carlo Rally was shortened when a competitor stopped on Stage 14, blocking traffic and forcing organisers to abandon the stage.

== Championship standings ==
=== FIA WRC2 for Drivers ===
Points are awarded to the top 10 classified finishers.

Position	1st	2nd	3rd	4th	5th	6th	7th	8th	9th	10th
Points	25	18	15	12	10	8	6	4	2	1

Pos.	Driver	MON (Monaco)	SWE (Sweden)	MEX (Mexico)	POR (Portugal)	ARG (Argentina)	ITA (Italy)	POL (Poland)	FIN (Finland)	GER (Germany)	AUS (Australia)	FRA (France)	ESP (Spain)	GBR (United Kingdom)	Drops	Points
1	(Qatar) Nasser Al-Attiyah				1	1	Ret			5	1		1	6	0	118
2	(Finland) Jari Ketomaa		2		2	11		2	2		2			1	0	115
3	(Italy) Lorenzo Bertelli	2	6	2		4	1				4			2	8	103
4	(Ukraine) Yuriy Protasov	1	5	1	14	Ret	3				3				0	90
5	(Estonia) Karl Kruuda		1		4		4	Ret	1				7	5	0	90
6	(Estonia) Ott Tänak			4		8	8	1	3	2	Ret				0	78
7	(Sweden) Pontus Tidemand				3					1		4				52
8	(Portugal) Bernardo Sousa				5		5	5		Ret		2	Ret	Ret	0	48
9	(Peru) Nicolás Fuchs			6	12	2	Ret	6					5	9	0	46
10	(Ukraine) Valeriy Gorban		7		8		15	4	7				6	7	0	42
11	(Saudi Arabia) Yazeed Al-Rajhi		4			WD	Ret	3	4		Ret					39
12	(Republic of Ireland) Robert Barrable	3			6								3			38
13	(Italy) Max Rendina	5	WD	3	13	13	12	8			6				0	37
14	(France) Quentin Gilbert			Ret		Ret	6					1		8		37
15	(France) Sébastien Chardonnet						2	11	Ret	Ret		3	Ret			33
16	(France) Julien Maurin	Ret			Ret		Ret			4			2			30
17	(Germany) Armin Kremer	4								3						27
18	(Greece) Jourdan Serderidis	6	Ret					9			Ret	7	8	10	0	21
19	(Argentina) Juan Carlos Alonso				15	7	9	10	6				Ret			17
20	(Qatar) Abdulaziz Al-Kuwari			WD	7	5	Ret									16
21	(Poland) Jarosław Kołtun							7				5		12		16
22	(Paraguay) Diego Domínguez					3										15
23	(Sweden) Fredrik Åhlin		3		Ret											15
24	(United Kingdom) Matthew Wilson													3		15
25	(Italy) Gianluca Linari		8	5		12	11									14
26	(United Kingdom) Tom Cave													4		12
27	(Indonesia) Subhan Aksa				9						5					12
28	(Mexico) Benito Guerra												4	EX		12
29	(Norway) Eyvind Brynildsen								5							10
30	(Paraguay) Miguel Angel Zaldivar					6										8
31	(Paraguay) Augusto Bestard			7		9										8
32	(United Arab Emirates) Rashid Al Ketbi				11			Ret		6			WD			8
33	(France) Johan Heloïse											6				8
34	(Estonia) Martin Kangur				10		7	Ret						Ret		7
35	(United Kingdom) Martin McCormack				Ret		Ret			7		Ret		Ret		6
36	(Chile) Ramon Torres					10	10	12								2
Pos.	Driver	MON (Monaco)	SWE (Sweden)	MEX (Mexico)	POR (Portugal)	ARG (Argentina)	ITA (Italy)	POL (Poland)	FIN (Finland)	GER (Germany)	AUS (Australia)	FRA (France)	ESP (Spain)	GBR (United Kingdom)	Drops	Points

Key
Colour	Result
Gold	Winner
Silver	2nd place
Bronze	3rd place
Green	Points finish
Blue	Non-points finish
Blue	Non-classified finish (NC)
Purple	Did not finish (Ret)
Black	Excluded (EX)
Black	Disqualified (DSQ)
White	Did not start (DNS)
White	Cancelled (C)
Blank	Withdrew entry from the event (WD)

=== FIA WRC2 for Co-Drivers ===
Pos.	Co-driver	MON (Monaco)	SWE (Sweden)	MEX (Mexico)	POR (Portugal)	ARG (Argentina)	ITA (Italy)	POL (Poland)	FIN (Finland)	GER (Germany)	AUS (Australia)	FRA (France)	ESP (Spain)	GBR (United Kingdom)	Drops	Points
1	(Italy) Giovanni Bernacchini				1	1	Ret			5	1		1	6	0	118
2	(Finland) Kaj Lindström		2		2	11		2	2		2			1	0	115
3	(Italy) Mitia Dotta	2	6	2		4	1				4			2	8	103
4	(Ukraine) Pavlo Cherepin	1	5	1	14	Ret	3				3				0	90
5	(Estonia) Martin Järveoja		1		4		4	Ret	1				8	5	0	90
6	(Estonia) Raigo Mõlder			4		8	8	1	3	2	Ret				0	78
7	(Portugal) Hugo Magalhães				5		5	5				2	Ret	Ret		48
8	(Argentina) Fernando Mussano			6	12	2	Ret	6					5	9	0	46
9	(Ukraine) Volodymyr Korsia		7		8		12	4	7				6	7	0	42
10	(United Kingdom) Michael Orr		4			WD	Ret	3	4		Ret					39
11	(United Kingdom) Stuart Loudon	3			6								3			38
12	(Italy) Mario Pizzuti	5	WD	3	13	13	12	8			6				0	39
13	(Belgium) Renaud Jamoul					Ret	6					1		8		37
14	(France) Thibault de la Haye						2	11	Ret	Ret		3	Ret			33
15	(France) Nicolas Klinger	Ret		Ret	Ret		Ret			4			2			30
16	(Germany) Klaus Wicha	4								3						27
17	(Italy) Nicola Arena		8	5	9		11				5					26
18	(Sweden) Emil Axelsson									1						25
19	(Argentina) Juan Pablo Monasterolo				15	7	9	10	6				Ret			17
20	(Republic of Ireland) Killian Duffy			WD	7	5	Ret									16
21	(Poland) Ireneusz Pleskot							7				5		12		16
22	(Norway) Ola Floene				3											15
23	(Argentina) Edgardo Galindo					3										15
24	(Norway) Morten Erik Abrahamsen		3		Ret											15
25	(United Kingdom) Scott Martin													3		15
26	(Paraguay) Fernando Mendonca			7		6										14
27	(Belgium) Frédéric Miclotte							9			Ret	7	8	10		13
28	(United Kingdom) Craig Parry													4		12
29	(Spain) Borja Rozada												4	EX		12
30	(Sweden) Patrik Barth											4				12
31	(Sweden) Anders Fredriksson								5							10
32	(Germany) Karina Hepperle				11			Ret		6			WD			8
33	(Belgium) Morgane Rose	6	Ret													8
34	(Italy) Roberto Mometti											6				8
35	(Poland) Paweł Drahan						7	Ret								6
36	(United Kingdom) Phil Clarke									7						6
37	(Paraguay) Enrique Fratta					9										2
38	(Argentina) José Díaz					10	10	12								2
39	(Estonia) Andres Ots				10											1
Pos.	Co-driver	MON (Monaco)	SWE (Sweden)	MEX (Mexico)	POR (Portugal)	ARG (Argentina)	ITA (Italy)	POL (Poland)	FIN (Finland)	GER (Germany)	AUS (Australia)	FRA (France)	ESP (Spain)	GBR (United Kingdom)	Drops	Points

Key
Colour	Result
Gold	Winner
Silver	2nd place
Bronze	3rd place
Green	Points finish
Blue	Non-points finish
Blue	Non-classified finish (NC)
Purple	Did not finish (Ret)
Black	Excluded (EX)
Black	Disqualified (DSQ)
White	Did not start (DNS)
White	Cancelled (C)
Blank	Withdrew entry from the event (WD)

=== FIA WRC2 for Teams ===
Pos.	Team	MON (Monaco)	SWE (Sweden)	MEX (Mexico)	POR (Portugal)	ARG (Argentina)	ITA (Italy)	POL (Poland)	FIN (Finland)	GER (Germany)	AUS (Australia)	FRA (France)	ESP (Spain)	GBR (United Kingdom)	Points
1	(United Kingdom) Drive DMACK		1	3	1	6	4	1	2						183
1	(United Kingdom) Drive DMACK					4		2	1						183
2	(Italy) FWRT s.r.l.	1	3	1		1	1				1			1	165
3	(Ukraine) Eurolamp World Rally Team		4		3		7	4	4				2	4	87
4	(Italy) www.Rallyproject.com	3	WD	2	7	7	10	6			3				78
5	(Saudi Arabia) Yazeed Racing		2				Ret	3	3		Ret			2	66
6	(Belgium) Top Teams by My Racing						2	7	Ret	Ret		1	Ret		57
7	(Poland) C-Rally							5				2		5	38
8	(Germany) Puma Rally Team			WD	2	2	Ret								36
9	(United Arab Emirates) Skydive Dubai Rally Team				6		WD	Ret		1			WD		33
10	(Indonesia) Bosowa Rally Team				4						2			Ret	30
11	MZR Paraguay					3								3	30
12	(Ukraine) AT Rally Team				5		3	Ret						Ret	25
13	(Italy) BAS Motorsport Srl								Ret				1	EX	25
14	ABR Paraguay by Astra			4		5									22
15	(Austria) Stohl Racing	2													18
16	(Italy) Top Run Srl											3			15
17	Sirbb Kuwait				8		6	WD	WD						12
Pos.	Team	MON (Monaco)	SWE (Sweden)	MEX (Mexico)	POR (Portugal)	ARG (Argentina)	ITA (Italy)	POL (Poland)	FIN (Finland)	GER (Germany)	AUS (Australia)	FRA (France)	ESP (Spain)	GBR (United Kingdom)	Points

Key
Colour	Result
Gold	Winner
Silver	2nd place
Bronze	3rd place
Green	Points finish
Blue	Non-points finish
Blue	Non-classified finish (NC)
Purple	Did not finish (Ret)
Black	Excluded (EX)
Black	Disqualified (DSQ)
White	Did not start (DNS)
White	Cancelled (C)
Blank	Withdrew entry from the event (WD)

=== FIA WRC2 Cup for Production Car Drivers ===
Pos.	Driver	MON (Monaco)	SWE (Sweden)	MEX (Mexico)	POR (Portugal)	ARG (Argentina)	ITA (Italy)	POL (Poland)	FIN (Finland)	GER (Germany)	AUS (Australia)	FRA (France)	ESP (Spain)	GBR (United Kingdom)	Drops	Points
1	(Italy) Max Rendina	1	WD	1	1	5	4	1			1				10	137
2	(Argentina) Juan Carlos Alonso				2	1	1	2	1				Ret			111
3	(Italy) Gianluca Linari		1	2		4	3									70
4	(Chile) Ramon Torres					3	2	3								48
5	(Paraguay) Augusto Bestard			3		2										33
6	(Mexico) Benito Guerra												1			25
7	(France) Johan Heloïse											1				25
8	(Italy) Marco Vallario				3		WD		WD							15
Pos.	Driver	MON (Monaco)	SWE (Sweden)	MEX (Mexico)	POR (Portugal)	ARG (Argentina)	ITA (Italy)	POL (Poland)	FIN (Finland)	GER (Germany)	AUS (Australia)	FRA (France)	ESP (Spain)	GBR (United Kingdom)	Drops	Points

Key
Colour	Result
Gold	Winner
Silver	2nd place
Bronze	3rd place
Green	Points finish
Blue	Non-points finish
Blue	Non-classified finish (NC)
Purple	Did not finish (Ret)
Black	Excluded (EX)
Black	Disqualified (DSQ)
White	Did not start (DNS)
White	Cancelled (C)
Blank	Withdrew entry from the event (WD)

=== FIA WRC2 Cup for Production Car Co-Drivers ===
Pos.	Co-driver	MON (Monaco)	SWE (Sweden)	MEX (Mexico)	POR (Portugal)	ARG (Argentina)	ITA (Italy)	POL (Poland)	FIN (Finland)	GER (Germany)	AUS (Australia)	FRA (France)	ESP (Spain)	GBR (United Kingdom)	Drops	Points
1	(Italy) Mario Pizzuti	1	WD	1	1	5	4	1			1				10	137
2	(Argentina) Juan Pablo Monasterolo				2	1	1	2	1				Ret			111
3	(Italy) Nicola Arena		1	2			3									58
4	(Argentina) José Díaz					3	2	3								48
5	(Spain) Borja Rozada												1			25
6	(Italy) Roberto Mometti											1				25
7	(Paraguay) Enrique Fratta					2										18
8	(Italy) Antonio Pascale				3		WD		WD							15
9	(Paraguay) Fernando Mendonca			3												15
10	(Italy) Danilo Fappani					4										12
Pos.	Co-driver	MON (Monaco)	SWE (Sweden)	MEX (Mexico)	POR (Portugal)	ARG (Argentina)	ITA (Italy)	POL (Poland)	FIN (Finland)	GER (Germany)	AUS (Australia)	FRA (France)	ESP (Spain)	GBR (United Kingdom)	Drops	Points

Key
Colour	Result
Gold	Winner
Silver	2nd place
Bronze	3rd place
Green	Points finish
Blue	Non-points finish
Blue	Non-classified finish (NC)
Purple	Did not finish (Ret)
Black	Excluded (EX)
Black	Disqualified (DSQ)
White	Did not start (DNS)
White	Cancelled (C)
Blank	Withdrew entry from the event (WD)
