= 2011 Rally Argentina =

2011 Rally Argentina 31º Rally Argentina
Round 6 of the 2011 World Rally Championship season
← Previous event	Next event →
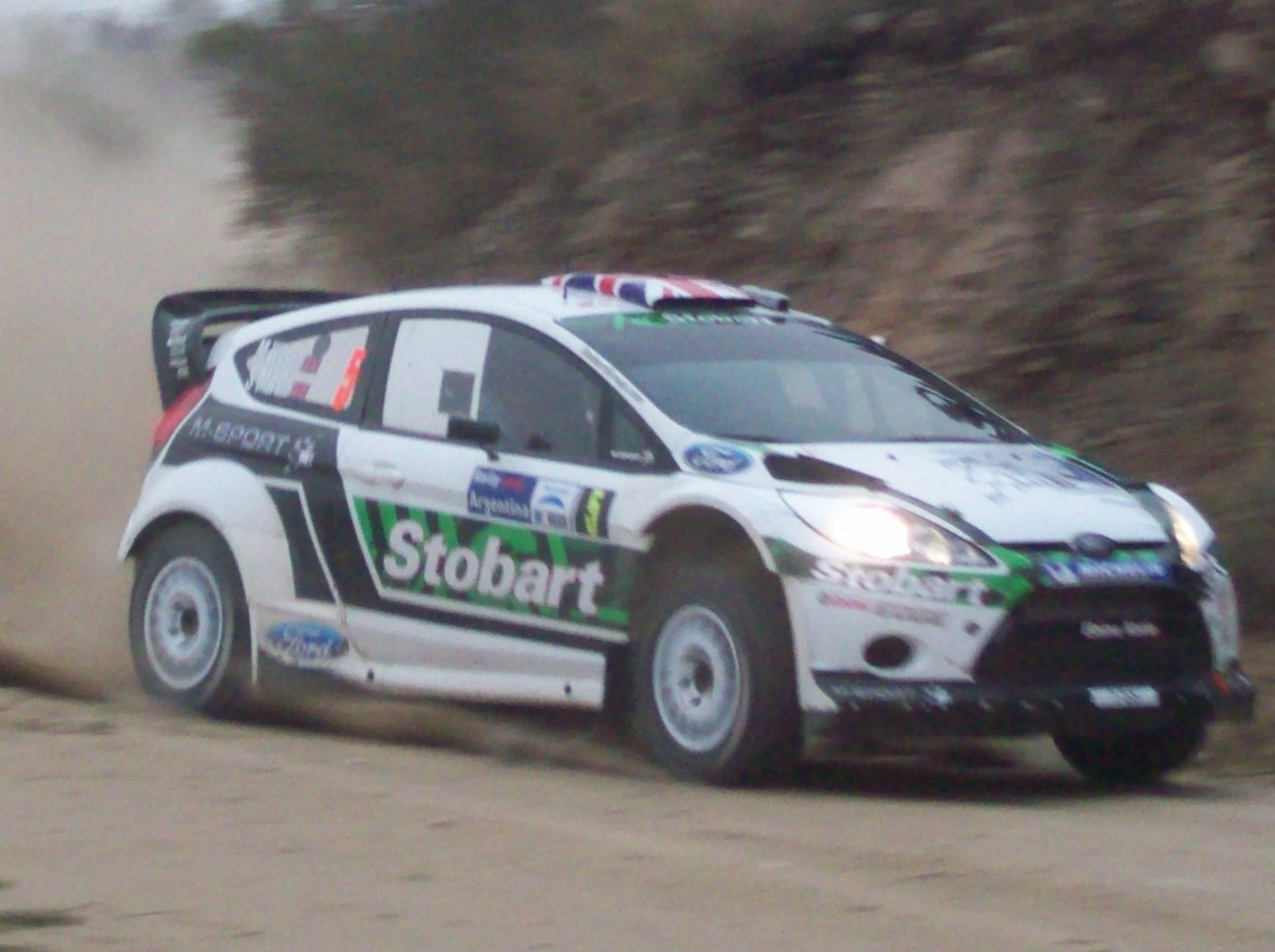
- Host country: Argentina
- Rally base: Villa Carlos Paz, Argentina
- Dates run: May 26 – 29 2011
- Stages: 19 (378.15 km; 234.97 miles)
- Stage surface: Gravel with some tarmac
- Overall distance: 1,457.08 km (905.39 miles)

Statistics
- Crews: 33 at start, 27 at finish

Overall results
- Overall winner: (France) Sébastien Loeb (France) Citroën World Rally Team

The 2011 Rally Argentina was the sixth round of the 2011 World Rally Championship season. The rally took place over 26–29 May, and was based in Villa Carlos Paz, in the province of Córdoba. The rally was also the third round of the Production World Rally Championship. Argentina returned to the WRC calendar for the first time since 2009, after the event was a part of the Intercontinental Rally Challenge in 2010.

Sébastien Loeb took his third win of the season and the 65th WRC win of his career after a come-from-behind victory over the final two days. Having run first on the road on the first day, Loeb trailed Jari-Matti Latvala by 90 seconds after day one, but six stage victories over the final two days helped to recover some of the lost time and ultimately took the rally victory on the final stage. Mikko Hirvonen was second, 2.4 seconds in arrears, with Sébastien Ogier a further 4.9 seconds back in third. Ogier had led the event into the final stage, but was driving a damaged car after a roll on an earlier stage. In the PWRC, Hayden Paddon took class victory and two points for an overall ninth place.

== Results ==
=== Event standings ===
Pos.	Driver	Co-driver	Car	Time	Difference	Points
1.	(France) Sébastien Loeb	(Monaco) Daniel Elena	Citroën DS3 WRC	4:03:56.9	0.0	26
2.	(Finland) Mikko Hirvonen	(Finland) Jarmo Lehtinen	Ford Fiesta RS WRC	4:03:59.3	2.4	20
3.	(France) Sébastien Ogier	(France) Julien Ingrassia	Citroën DS3 WRC	4:04:04.2	7.3	15
4.	(Norway) Petter Solberg	(United Kingdom) Chris Patterson	Citroën DS3 WRC	4:04:29.5	32.6	15
5.	(Norway) Mads Østberg	(Sweden) Jonas Andersson	Ford Fiesta RS WRC	4:09:13.7	5:16.8	10
6.	(Argentina) Federico Villagra	(Argentina) Jorge Pérez Companc	Ford Fiesta RS WRC	4:10:45.4	6:48.5	8
7.	(Finland) Jari-Matti Latvala	(Finland) Miikka Anttila	Ford Fiesta RS WRC	4:15:31.4	11:34.5	6
8.	(United Kingdom) Matthew Wilson	(United Kingdom) Scott Martin	Ford Fiesta RS WRC	4:17:29.6	13:32.7	4
9.	(New Zealand) Hayden Paddon	(New Zealand) John Kennard	Subaru Impreza WRX STI	4:29:40.7	25:43.8	2
10.	(Sweden) Patrik Flodin	(Sweden) Maria Andersson	Subaru Impreza WRX STI	4:37:31.1	33:34.1	1
PWRC
1. (9.)	(New Zealand) Hayden Paddon	(New Zealand) John Kennard	Subaru Impreza WRX STI	4:29:40.7	0.0	25
2. (10.)	(Sweden) Patrik Flodin	(Sweden) Maria Andersson	Subaru Impreza WRX STI	4:37:31.1	7:50.4	18
3. (11.)	(Russia) Dmitry Tagirov	(Russia) Anna Zavershinskaya	Subaru Impreza WRX STI	4:43:07.6	13:26.9	15
4. (12.)	(Peru) Nicolás Fuchs	(Argentina) Rubén Francisco García	Mitsubishi Lancer Evo IX	4:47:53.1	18:12.4	12
5. (14.)	(Czech Republic) Martin Semerád	(Czech Republic) Michal Ernst	Mitsubishi Lancer Evo X	4:51:56.5	22:15.8	10
6. (15.)	(Mexico) Benito Guerra	(Spain) Borja Rozada	Mitsubishi Lancer Evo X	4:52:57.1	23:16.4	8
7. (16.)	(Argentina) Ezequiel Campos	(Argentina) Cristian Winkler	Mitsubishi Lancer Evo IX	4:54:17.5	24:36.8	6
8. (17.)	(Italy) Gianluca Linari	(Italy) Nicola Arena	Subaru Impreza WRX STI	4:56:52.7	27:12.0	4
9. (19.)	(Ukraine) Yuriy Protasov	(Ukraine) Adrian Aftanaziv	Mitsubishi Lancer Evo X	4:57:25.5	27:44.8	2
10. (20.)	(Poland) Michał Kościuszko	(Poland) Maciek Szczepaniak	Mitsubishi Lancer Evo X	4:58:04.7	28:24.0	1

=== Special stages ===
Day	Stage	Time	Name	Length	Winner	Time	Avg. spd.	Rally leader
Leg 1 (26–27 May)	SS1	15:05	Super Especial Carlos Paz 1	3.02 km	(France) Sébastien Loeb	2:25.9	74.52 km/h	(France) Sébastien Loeb
Leg 1 (26–27 May)	SS2	9:36	El Mirador 1	18.23 km	(Finland) Jari-Matti Latvala	10:27.0	104.67 km/h	(Finland) Jari-Matti Latvala
Leg 1 (26–27 May)	SS3	10:08	Mina Clavero 1	22.67 km	(Finland) Jari-Matti Latvala	19:42.5	69.02 km/h	(Finland) Jari-Matti Latvala
Leg 1 (26–27 May)	SS4	11:01	El Condor 1	37.32 km	(Finland) Jari-Matti Latvala	23:18.9	96.04 km/h	(Finland) Jari-Matti Latvala
Leg 1 (26–27 May)	SS5	15:17	El Mirador 2	18.23 km	(Finland) Jari-Matti Latvala	10:19.0	106.03 km/h	(Finland) Jari-Matti Latvala
Leg 1 (26–27 May)	SS6	15:49	Mina Clavero 2	22.67 km	(Norway) Petter Solberg	19:21.7	70.25 km/h	(Finland) Jari-Matti Latvala
Leg 1 (26–27 May)	SS7	16:42	El Condor 2	37.32 km	(France) Sébastien Loeb	23:19.4	96.01 km/h	(Finland) Jari-Matti Latvala
Leg 2 (28 May)	SS8	8:13	Las Jarillas 1	21.57 km	(France) Sébastien Ogier	12:21.3	104.75 km/h	(Finland) Jari-Matti Latvala
Leg 2 (28 May)	SS9	9:46	Las Bajadas 1	16.57 km	(France) Sébastien Loeb	9:04.1	109.63 km/h	(Finland) Jari-Matti Latvala
Leg 2 (28 May)	SS10	10:32	Amboy 1	20.33 km	(France) Sébastien Loeb	10:38.0	114.71 km/h	(Finland) Jari-Matti Latvala
Leg 2 (28 May)	SS11	11:13	Santa Rosa 1	21.36 km	(France) Sébastien Loeb	13:06.2	97.81 km/h	(Finland) Jari-Matti Latvala
Leg 2 (28 May)	SS12	14:08	Las Jarillas 2	21.57 km	(France) Sébastien Ogier	12:21.6	104.71 km/h	(Finland) Jari-Matti Latvala
Leg 2 (28 May)	SS13	15:41	Las Bajadas 2	16.57 km	(France) Sébastien Ogier	9:00.7	110.32 km/h	(France) Sébastien Ogier
Leg 2 (28 May)	SS14	16:27	Amboy 2	20.33 km	(France) Sébastien Loeb	10:32.7	115.68 km/h	(France) Sébastien Ogier
Leg 2 (28 May)	SS15	17:08	Santa Rosa 2	21.36 km	(France) Sébastien Loeb	12:59.3	98.67 km/h	(France) Sébastien Ogier
Leg 3 (29 May)	SS16	8:09	Ascochinga	48.21 km	(France) Sébastien Loeb	35:53.7	80.59 km/h	(France) Sébastien Ogier
Leg 3 (29 May)	SS17	10:27	Cabalango 1	3.90 km	(Finland) Jari-Matti Latvala	2:22.2	98.73 km/h	(France) Sébastien Ogier
Leg 3 (29 May)	SS18	11:38	Super Especial Carlos Paz 2	3.02 km	(Norway) Petter Solberg	2:25.5	74.72 km/h	(France) Sébastien Ogier
Leg 3 (29 May)	SS19	12:10	Cabalango 2 (Power stage)	3.90 km	(Norway) Petter Solberg	2:20.1	100.21 km/h	(France) Sébastien Loeb

=== Power Stage ===
The "Power stage" was a live, televised 3.90 km (2.42 mi) stage at the end of the rally, held in Cabalango.

Pos	Driver	Time	Diff.	Avg. speed	Points
1	(Norway) Petter Solberg	2:20.1	0.0	100.21 km/h	3
2	(Finland) Mikko Hirvonen	2:20.6	+0.5	99.86 km/h	2
3	(France) Sébastien Loeb	2:20.6	+0.5	99.86 km/h	1
