= 2015 Rally Catalunya =

Twelfth round of the 2015 World Rally Championship

2015 Rally Catalunya: 51. RallyRACC Catalunya – Costa Daurada
Round 12 of the 2015 World Rally Championship season
← Previous event	Next event →
- Host country: Spain
- Rally base: Salou, Spain
- Dates run: October 22 – October 25, 2015
- Stages: 23 (331.25 km; 205.83 miles)
- Stage surface: Tarmac/Gravel

Overall results
- Overall winner: (Norway) Andreas Mikkelsen (Norway) Ola Fløene (Germany) Volkswagen Motorsport II

The 2015 Rally Catalunya (formally the 51. RallyRACC Catalunya – Costa Daurada) was the twelfth round of the 2015 World Rally Championship. The race was held over four days between 22 October and 25 October 2015, and operated out of Salou, Catalonia, Spain. Volkswagen's Andreas Mikkelsen won the race, his first win in the World Rally Championship.

== Special stages ==
Day	Stage number	Stage name	Length	Stage winner	Car No.	Team	Time	Avg. spd.	Rally leader
22 October (Tarmac)	SS1	(Spain) Barcelona	3.20 km	(France) Sébastien Ogier (France) Julien Ingrassia	1	(Germany) Volkswagen Motorsport	3:37.8	52.9 km/h	(France) Sébastien Ogier (France) Julien Ingrassia
23 October (Gravel)	SS2	(Spain) Móra d'ebre-Ascó 1	9.62 km	(Norway) Mads Østberg (Sweden) Jonas Andersson	4	(France) Citroën Total Abu Dhabi World Rally Team	5:55.6	97.4 km/h	(France) Sébastien Ogier (France) Julien Ingrassia
23 October (Gravel)	SS2	(Spain) Móra d'ebre-Ascó 1	9.62 km	(New Zealand) Hayden Paddon (New Zealand) John Kennard	20	(Germany) Hyundai Motorsport N	5:55.6	97.4 km/h	(France) Sébastien Ogier (France) Julien Ingrassia
23 October (Gravel)	SS3	(Spain) Caseres 1	12.50 km	(Poland) Robert Kubica (Poland) Maciek Szczepaniak	14	(Poland) Robert Kubica	7:25.9	100.9 km/h	(Poland) Robert Kubica (Poland) Maciek Szczepaniak
23 October (Gravel)	SS4	(Spain) Bot 1	6.50 km	(Estonia) Ott Tänak (Estonia) Raigo Mõlder	6	(United Kingdom) M-Sport World Rally Team	4:11.5	93.0 km/h	(Poland) Robert Kubica (Poland) Maciek Szczepaniak
23 October (Gravel)	SS5	(Spain) Terra Alta 1	35.68 km	(Finland) Jari-Matti Latvala (Finland) Miikka Anttila	2	(Germany) Volkswagen Motorsport	23:20.9	91.7 km/h	(France) Sébastien Ogier (France) Julien Ingrassia
23 October (Gravel)	SS6	(Spain) Móra d'ebre-Ascó 2	9.62 km	(Estonia) Ott Tänak (Estonia) Raigo Mõlder	6	(United Kingdom) M-Sport World Rally Team	5:48.5	99.4 km/h	(Finland) Jari-Matti Latvala (Finland) Miikka Anttila
23 October (Gravel)	SS6	(Spain) Móra d'ebre-Ascó 2	9.62 km	(Poland) Robert Kubica (Poland) Maciek Szczepaniak	14	(Poland) Robert Kubica	5:48.5	99.4 km/h	(Finland) Jari-Matti Latvala (Finland) Miikka Anttila
23 October (Gravel)	SS7	(Spain) Caseres 2	12.50 km	(Norway) Mads Østberg (Sweden) Jonas Andersson	4	(France) Citroën Total Abu Dhabi World Rally Team	7:18.4	102.6 km/h	(Finland) Jari-Matti Latvala (Finland) Miikka Anttila
23 October (Gravel)	SS8	(Spain) Bot 2	6.50 km	(Estonia) Ott Tänak (Estonia) Raigo Mõlder	6	(United Kingdom) M-Sport World Rally Team	4:04.4	95.7 km/h	(Finland) Jari-Matti Latvala (Finland) Miikka Anttila
23 October (Gravel)	SS9	(Spain) Terra Alta 2	35.68 km	(France) Sébastien Ogier (France) Julien Ingrassia	1	(Germany) Volkswagen Motorsport	22:49.4	93.8 km/h	(France) Sébastien Ogier (France) Julien Ingrassia
24 October (Tarmac)	SS10	(Spain) Porrera	7.43 km	(France) Sébastien Ogier (France) Julien Ingrassia	1	(Germany) Volkswagen Motorsport	5:14.9	84.9 km/h	(France) Sébastien Ogier (France) Julien Ingrassia
24 October (Tarmac)	SS11	(Spain) La Figuera 1	26.26 km	(France) Sébastien Ogier (France) Julien Ingrassia	1	(Germany) Volkswagen Motorsport	14:32.4	108.4 km/h	(France) Sébastien Ogier (France) Julien Ingrassia
24 October (Tarmac)	SS12	(Spain) Poboleda 1	10.63 km	(France) Sébastien Ogier (France) Julien Ingrassia	1	(Germany) Volkswagen Motorsport	5:36.3	113.8 km/h	(France) Sébastien Ogier (France) Julien Ingrassia
24 October (Tarmac)	SS13	(Spain) Capafonts 1	19.80 km	(Finland) Jari-Matti Latvala (Finland) Miikka Anttila	2	(Germany) Volkswagen Motorsport	10:47.2	110.1 km/h	(France) Sébastien Ogier (France) Julien Ingrassia
24 October (Tarmac)	SS14	(Spain) La Figuera 2	26.26 km	(Finland) Jari-Matti Latvala (Finland) Miikka Anttila	2	(Germany) Volkswagen Motorsport	14:36.4	107.9 km/h	(France) Sébastien Ogier (France) Julien Ingrassia
24 October (Tarmac)	SS15	(Spain) Poboleda 2	10.63 km	(France) Sébastien Ogier (France) Julien Ingrassia	1	(Germany) Volkswagen Motorsport	5:40.2	112.5 km/h	(France) Sébastien Ogier (France) Julien Ingrassia
24 October (Tarmac)	SS16	(Spain) Capafonts 2	19.80 km	(Finland) Jari-Matti Latvala (Finland) Miikka Anttila	2	(Germany) Volkswagen Motorsport	10:45:0	110.5 km/h	(France) Sébastien Ogier (France) Julien Ingrassia
24 October (Tarmac)	SS17	(Spain) Salou	2.24 km	(France) Sébastien Ogier (France) Julien Ingrassia	1	(Germany) Volkswagen Motorsport	2:33.4	52.6 km/h	(France) Sébastien Ogier (France) Julien Ingrassia
24 October (Tarmac)	SS17	(Spain) Salou	2.24 km	(Belgium) Thierry Neuville (Belgium) Nicolas Gilsoul	7	(Germany) Hyundai Motorsport	2:33.4	52.6 km/h	(France) Sébastien Ogier (France) Julien Ingrassia
25 October (Tarmac)	SS18	(Spain) Guiamets 1	6.80 km	(Norway) Andreas Mikkelsen (Norway) Ola Fløene	9	(Germany) Volkswagen Motorsport II	3:48.3	107.2 km/h	(France) Sébastien Ogier (France) Julien Ingrassia
25 October (Tarmac)	SS19	(Spain) Pratdip 1	19.30 km	(Norway) Andreas Mikkelsen (Norway) Ola Fløene	9	(Germany) Volkswagen Motorsport II	10:51.0	106.7 km/h	(France) Sébastien Ogier (France) Julien Ingrassia
25 October (Tarmac)	SS20	(Spain) Duesaigües 1	12.10 km	(Finland) Jari-Matti Latvala (Finland) Miikka Anttila	2	(Germany) Volkswagen Motorsport	7:54.2	91.9 km/h	(France) Sébastien Ogier (France) Julien Ingrassia
25 October (Tarmac)	SS21	(Spain) Guiamets 2	6.80 km	(Norway) Andreas Mikkelsen (Norway) Ola Fløene	9	(Germany) Volkswagen Motorsport II	3:47.8	107.5 km/h	(France) Sébastien Ogier (France) Julien Ingrassia
25 October (Tarmac)	SS22	(Spain) Pratdip 2	19.30 km	(Finland) Jari-Matti Latvala (Finland) Miikka Anttila	2	(Germany) Volkswagen Motorsport	10:51.1	106.7 km/h	(France) Sébastien Ogier (France) Julien Ingrassia
25 October (Tarmac)	SS23	(Spain) Duesaigües 2 (Power Stage)	12.10 km	(Norway) Andreas Mikkelsen (Norway) Ola Fløene	9	(Germany) Volkswagen Motorsport II	7:51.9	92.3 km/h	(Norway) Andreas Mikkelsen (Norway) Ola Fløene
