= Yohan Rossel =

French rally driver (born 1995)

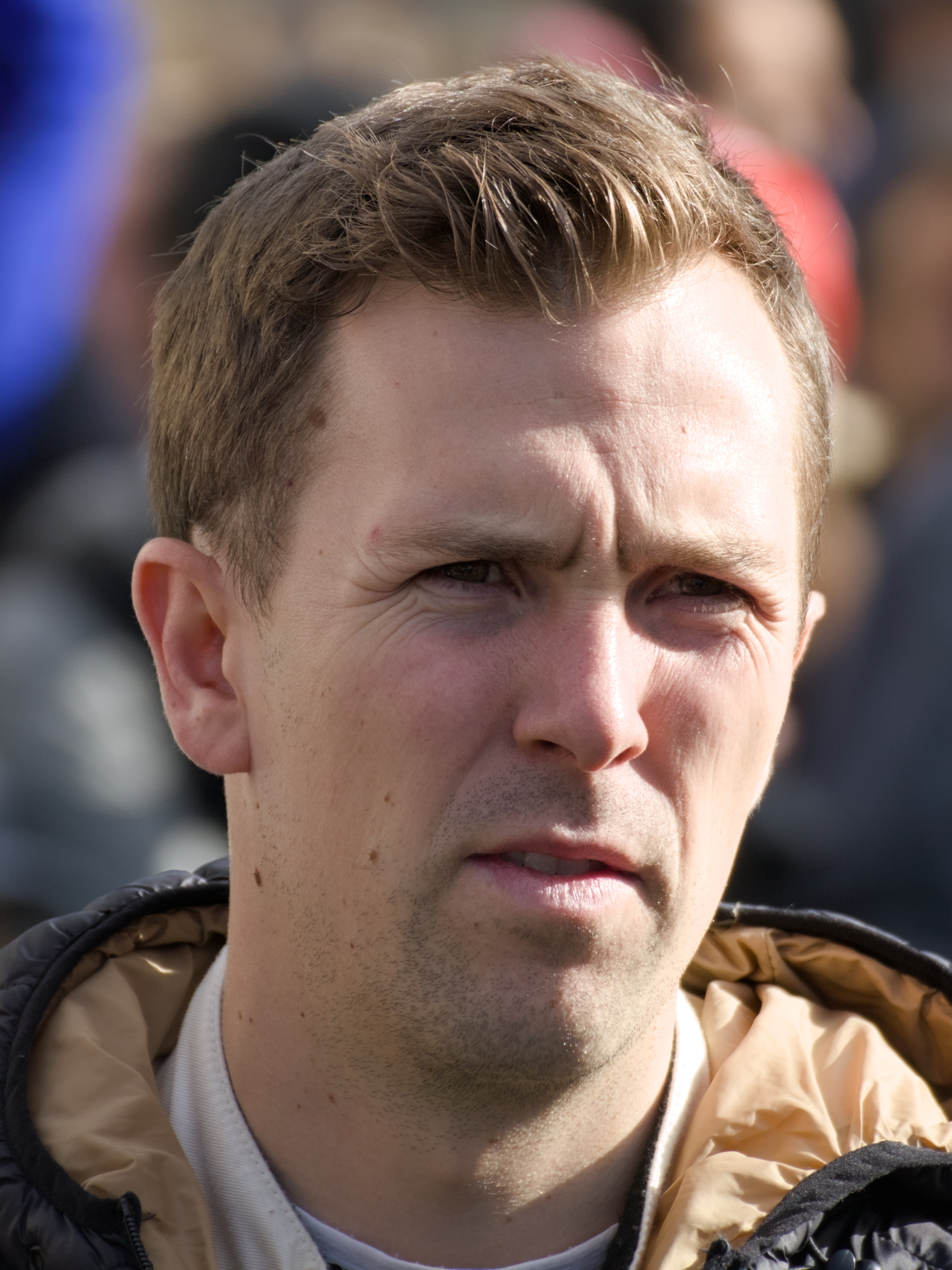
- Rossel at the 2023 Central European Rally
- Nationality: (France) French
- Full name: Yohan Richard Claude Rossel
- Born: 13 February 1995 (age 31) Nîmes, France
- Relatives: Léo Rossel (brother)
World Rally Championship record
- Years active: 2014–2017, 2019–present
- Co-driver: (France) Benoît Fulcrand (France) Alexandre Coria (France) Jacques-Julien Renucci (France) Arnaud Dunand (France) Benjamin Boulloud
- Teams: PH Sport, DG Sport Compétition, Lancia Corse HF
- Rallies: 54
- Championships: 0
- Rally wins: 0
- Podiums: 0
- Stage wins: 0
- Total points: 88
- First rally: 2014 Rallye de France-Alsace
- Last rally: 2026 Rally Chile

Yohan Richard Claude Rossel (French pronunciation: [jo.an ʁɔ.sɛl]; born 13 February 1995) is a French rally driver. In 2021, he became the driver's champion in the WRC3 category. Rossel is also the 2019 French Rally champion.Rossel is currently racing in WRC2 with the Lancia Ypsilon Rally2 HF Integrale for Lancia Corse HF, the official Lancia team. His younger brother, Léo Rossel, is also a rally driver and races in WRC2 with the Lancia Ypsilon Rally 2 HF Integrale. He has also raced in the ERC.

== Results ==
=== WRC results ===
Year	Entrant	Car	1	2	3	4	5	6	7	8	9	10	11	12	13	14	WDC	Points
2014	Rallye Jeunes FFSA	Citroën DS3 R3T	MON	SWE	MEX	POR	ARG	ITA	POL	FIN	GER	AUS	FRA; EX	ESP	GBR		NC	0
2015	Equipe de France FFSA	Citroën DS3 R3T Max	MON; 33	SWE	MEX	ARG	POR	ITA	POL	FIN	GER	AUS	FRA; 94	ESP	GBR		NC	0
2016	Equipe de France FFSA	Citroën DS3 R3T Max	MON	SWE	MEX	ARG	POR	ITA	POL	FIN	GER	CHN; C	FRA; 20	ESP	GBR; 31	AUS	NC	0
2017	Yohan Rossel	Citroën DS3 R5	MON	SWE	MEX	FRA; 10	ARG	POR; 38	ITA; 15	POL	FIN	GER; 41	ESP; WD	GBR	AUS		24th	1
2019	Yohan Rossel	Peugeot 208 R2	MON; 27	SWE	MEX	FRA	ARG	CHL	POR	ITA	FIN	GER	TUR	GBR	ESP	AUS; C	NC	0
2020	PH Sport	Citroën C3 R5	MON; 13	SWE	MEX	EST; 22	TUR	ITA; 39	MNZ; 35								NC	0
2021	Yohan Rossel	Citroën C3 R5	MON; 11	ARC	CRO; 14	POR; 14	ITA; 7	KEN	EST	BEL; 7	GRE; EX	FIN	ESP	MNZ; 11			15th	12
2022	PH Sport	Citroën C3 Rally2	MON; 13	SWE	CRO; 7	POR; 10	ITA; 18	KEN	EST	FIN	BEL; 8	GRE; Ret	NZL	ESP; 12	JPN		17th	11
2023	PH Sport	Citroën C3 Rally2	MON; 9	SWE	MEX	CRO; 8	POR; 9	ITA; 8	KEN	EST	FIN; 17	GRE; 9	CHL; 9	EUR; Ret	JPN		15th	16
2024	DG Sport Compétition	Citroën C3 Rally2	MON; 8	SWE	KEN	CRO; 9	POR; 12	ITA; 7	POL	LAT	FIN; 13	GRE; 6	CHL; 8	EUR; 26	JPN		16th	14
2025	PH Sport	Citroën C3 Rally2	MON; 8	SWE	KEN	ESP; 8	POR; 11	ITA; 33	GRE; 8	EST	FIN; 19	PAR; 8	CHL; 23	EUR	JPN	SAU	13th	16
2026	Lancia Corse HF	Lancia Ypsilon Rally2 HF Integrale	MON; 18	SWE	KEN	CRO; 4	ESP; 9	POR; 38	JPN	GRE; Ret	EST	FIN; 16	PAR; 12	CHL; 8	ITA	SAU; C	11th	24

* Season still in progress.

=== WRC-2 results ===
Year	Entrant	Car	1	2	3	4	5	6	7	8	9	10	11	12	13	14	Pos.	Points
2017	Yohan Rossel	Citroën DS3 R5	MON	SWE	MEX	FRA; 3	ARG	POR; 16	ITA; 4	POL	FIN	GER; 15	ESP; WD	GBR	AUS		14th	27
2022	PH Sport	Citroën C3 Rally2	MON; 6	SWE	CRO; 1	POR; 1	ITA; 11	KEN	EST	FIN	BEL; 3	GRE; Ret	NZL	ESP; 2	JPN		4th	98
2023	PH Sport	Citroën C3 Rally2	MON; 1	SWE	MEX	CRO; 1	POR; 4	ITA; 4	KEN	EST	FIN	GRE; 3	CHL; 4	EUR; Ret	JPN		3rd	104
2024	DG Sport Compétition	Citroën C3 Rally2	MON; 1	SWE	KEN	CRO; 2	POR; 5	ITA; 2	POL	LAT	FIN	GRE; 3	CHL; 1	EUR; 11	JPN		4th	111
2025	PH Sport	Citroën C3 Rally2	MON; 1	SWE	KEN	ESP; 1	POR; 2	ITA; 17	GRE; 3	EST	FIN	PAR; 2	CHL; 11	EUR	JPN	SAU	2nd	99
2026	Lancia Corse HF	Lancia Ypsilon Rally2 HF Integrale	MON; 9	SWE	KEN	CRO; 1	ESP; 1	POR; 18	JPN	GRE; Ret	EST	FIN	PAR; 6	CHL; 1	ITA	SAU	3rd	85

* Season still in progress.

=== WRC-3 results ===
Year	Entrant	Car	1	2	3	4	5	6	7	8	9	10	11	12	13	14	Pos.	Points
2014	Rallye Jeunes FFSA	Citroën DS3 R3T	MON	SWE	MEX	POR	ARG	ITA	POL	FIN	GER	AUS	FRA; EX	ESP	GBR		NC	0
2015	Equipe de France FFSA	Citroën DS3 R3T Max	MON; 6	SWE	MEX	ARG	POR	ITA	POL	FIN	GER	AUS	FRA; 5	ESP	GBR		19th	8
2016	Equipe de France FFSA	Citroën DS3 R3T Max	MON	SWE	MEX	ARG	POR	ITA	POL	FIN	GER	CHN; C	FRA; 2	ESP	GBR; 3	AUS	10	33
2020	PH Sport	Citroën C3 R5	MON; 4	SWE	MEX	EST; 9	TUR	ITA; 11	MNZ; 10								12th	15
2021	Yohan Rossel	Citroën C3 R5	MON; 1	ARC	CRO; 3	POR; 2	ITA; 1	KEN	EST	BEL; 1	GRE; EX	FIN	ESP	MNZ; 2			1st	130

=== JWRC results ===
Year	Entrant	Car	1	2	3	4	5	6	7	Pos.	Points
2014	Rallye Jeunes FFSA	Citroën DS3 R3T	POR	POL	FIN	GER	FRA; 5	GBR		13th	10
2015	Equipe de France FFSA	Citroën DS3 R3T Max	MON; 5	POR	POL	FIN	FRA; 3	ESP	GBR	10th	25
2016	Equipe de France FFSA	Citroën DS3 R3T Max	POR	POL	FIN	GER	FRA; 2	GBR; 3		7th	33
