= 2017 WRC3 Championship =

The 2017 FIA WRC3 Championship was the fifth season of WRC3, a rallying championship recognised by the Fédération Internationale de l'Automobile, running in support of the World Rally Championship. It was created when the Group R class of rally car was introduced in 2013.

Drivers and teams had to nominate a maximum of seven events, the best six results counted towards the championship.

Simone Tempestini did not return to defend the 2016 title as he competed in the 2017 WRC2 Championship. Nil Solans won the title with a Ford Fiesta R2T.

== Calendar ==
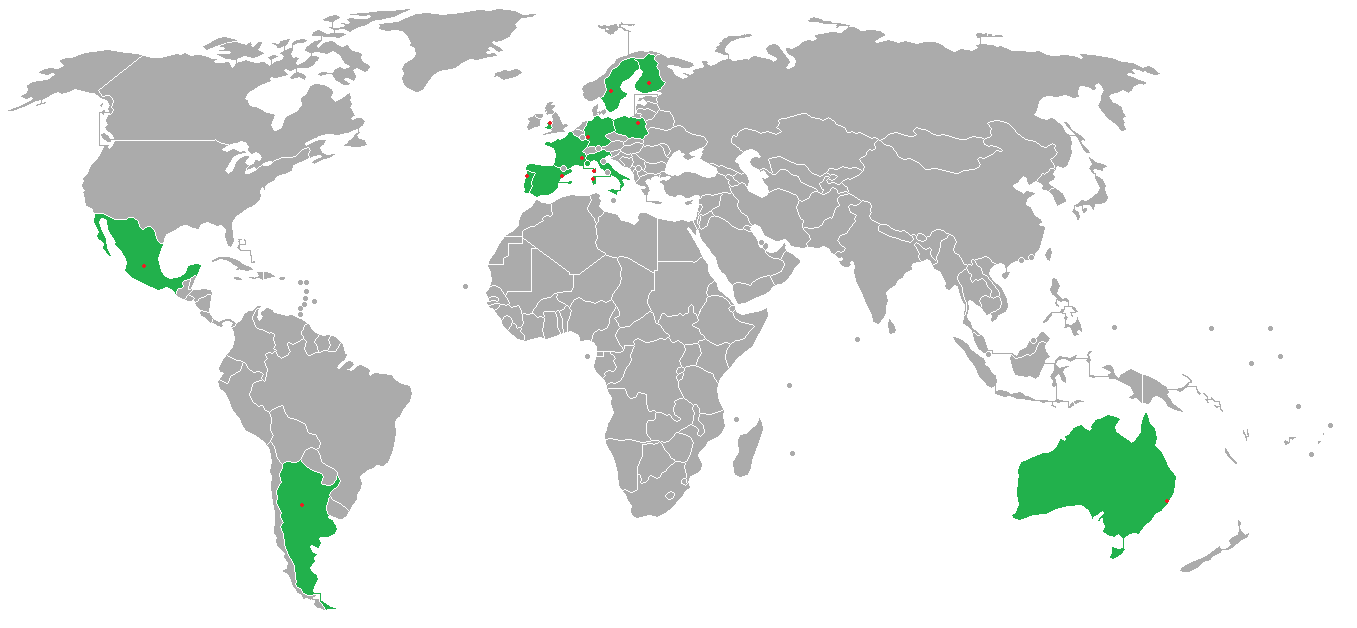
Nations that hosted a rally in 2017 are highlighted in green, with rally headquarters marked by a red dot.

The season was contested over thirteen rounds in Europe, the Americas and Oceania.

Round	Dates		Rally name	Rally headquarters	Rally details		
Round	Start	Finish	Rally name	Rally headquarters	Surface	Stages	Distance
1	19 January	22 January	(Monaco) Monte Carlo Rally	Gap, Hautes-Alpes, France	Mixed (Note: Rallye Monte Carlo was run on a tarmac and snow surface.)	15 (Note: Rallye Monte Carlo was shortened when the first stage was cancelled due to a fatal accident involving a spectator. The sixteenth stage was later cancelled owing to overcrowding of spectators.)	355.96 km
2	9 February	12 February	Rally Sweden	Torsby, Värmland	Snow	17 (Note: Rally Sweden was shortened when the second pass over the Knon stage was cancelled on the advice of the FIA as the leading drivers exceeded the maximum average stage speed of 130 km/h (80.8 mph) during the first run through the stage.)	305.83 km
3	9 March	12 March	Rally Mexico	León, Guanajuato	Gravel	17 (Note: Rally Mexico had its route shortened when a highway accident prevented the cars being transported to León in time for the start of the first stages.)	231.25 km
4	7 April	9 April	(France) Tour de Corse	Bastia, Haute-Corse	Tarmac	10	316.76 km
5	27 April	30 April	Rally Argentina	Villa Carlos Paz, Córdoba	Gravel	18	356.49 km
6	18 May	21 May	Rally de Portugal	Matosinhos, Porto	Gravel	19	349.17 km
7	8 June	11 June	(Italy) Rally Italia Sardegna	Alghero, Sardinia	Gravel	19	312.66 km
8	29 June	2 July	Rally Poland	Mikołajki, Warmia-Masuria	Gravel	22 (Note: The sixth stage of Rally Poland was cancelled after heavy rains in the region created large puddles of standing water on the stage which was subsequently deemed too dangerous.)	338.34 km
9	27 July	30 July	Rally Finland	Jyväskylä, Keski-Suomi	Gravel	25	315.62 km
10	17 August	20 August	(Germany) Rallye Deutschland	Saarbrücken, Saarland	Tarmac	21	309.17 km
11	6 October	8 October	(Spain) Rally Catalunya	Salou, Tarragona	Mixed (Note: Rally Catalunya was run on a tarmac and gravel surface.)	19	312.02 km
12	26 October	29 October	(United Kingdom) Wales Rally GB	Deeside, Flintshire	Gravel	20	306.13 km
13	17 November	19 November	Rally Australia	Coffs Harbour, New South Wales	Gravel	19 (Note: Rally Australia had its route shortened after a bridge in the Newry stage was found to be damaged, making the second pass over the stage impossible to complete. The penultimate stage, Pilbara Reverse 2, was also cancelled after heavy rain made conditions unsafe.)	287.68 km

=== Calendar changes ===
The FIA re-organised the calendar for the 2017 season to include a greater variation in surfaces between events, bringing the Tour de Corse forward from October to April. The decision was made after concerns were expressed about the 2016 calendar, which originally contained six consecutive gravel events followed by four tarmac rallies.

The Rally of China was removed from the calendar. The event had been included on the 2016 calendar before storm damage to the proposed route forced its cancellation. The round was removed from the 2017 calendar to give event organisers more time to prepare for a future bid to rejoin the calendar. Similarly, the FIA put the Rallies of Argentina and Poland on notice regarding safety concerns, threatening to rescind their World Championship status for the 2017 season unless safety standards were improved in 2016, with drivers citing a lack of safety marshalls and expressing concerns over spectators getting too close to the cars as the main areas to be addressed. Both events were subsequently included on the calendar.

The Rallies of Sweden and Germany changed their headquarters. The Rally of Sweden stayed within Värmland County, but relocated from Karlstad to Torsby. The Rally of Germany moved from Trier in Rhineland-Palatine to Saarbrücken in the neighbouring state of Saarland.

=== Route changes ===
The Rallye Monte-Carlo introduced a heavily revised itinerary, with eighty-five percent of the route used in 2016 being revised for the 2017 event, which saw the competitive distance increase from 337.59 km to 382.65 km and included the Col de Turini as part of the Power Stage. Rally Sweden adjusted its route to remove the emphasis on purpose-built stages that had filled out the event itinerary in previous years. The new route raised the average speed of the rally and introduced more competitive mileage in Hedmark County in neighbouring Norway.

Rally Mexico also featured route revisions, with the eighty-kilometre Guanajuato stage—the longest in the championship in 2016—removed from the schedule; however, the addition of new stages and further changes to existing ones meant that the overall competitive distance of the 2017 rally was only six kilometres shorter than the route used in the 2016 event. The rally started in Mexico City with a spectator-friendly stage before moving to its traditional headquarters in León. The Tour de Corse shortened its route by seventy-four kilometres, from 390.92 km in 2016 down to 316.76 km in 2017, with most of the changes coming from shortening each of the individual stages used in 2016. Rally Portugal shortened its route by twenty kilometres, reintroducing stages that had not been used for several years and reconfiguring stages from the 2016 event. Rally Poland also revised its route, introducing a series of brand-new stages close to the Russian border. The changes saw the crews compete on a wider ranges of surfaces—including tarmac and cobblestones—within individual stages, although the rally was still officially classified as a gravel surface event.

Following the cancellation of stages in Rally Sweden when the front-running cars exceeded the maximum average speed mandated by the FIA, Rally Finland was forced to revise its route to find ways of keeping the average stage speed down—with some estimates predicting that the 2017 generation of cars could exceed 140 km/h (87.0 mph)—to avoid stage cancellations. This was achieved by installing artificial chicanes into all but two of the stages, which proved to be controversial as drivers complained that they were too narrow and thus had the potential to damage cars, and were poorly-positioned with little regulatory oversight from rally organisers. With Rallye Deutschland moving to a new headquarters, the rally routed was revised. The vineyard and military proving ground stages in the Baumholder region were retained, but the final leg of the route was changed to introduce high-speed stages based on country lanes.

Rally Catalunya introduced several new and returning stages to its route, focusing on the tarmac legs of the event. Organisers of the Wales Rally GB retained the event route used in 2016, but revised the itinerary to increase its difficulty, with the route featuring earlier start times, later finishes and the reintroduction of night stages. Rally Australia underwent route revisions, introducing a new loop of stages north of the rally headquarters in Coffs Harbour. The new stages were designed to be faster and more technical than in previous events.

== Teams and drivers ==
Entrant	Car	Class	Tyre	Drivers	Co-drivers	Rounds
(France) Renault Sport Racing Team	Renault Clio RS R3T	R3	M	(Switzerland) Cédric Althaus	(Switzerland) Jessica Bayard	1
(France) Renault Sport Racing Team	Renault Clio RS R3T	R3	M	(France) Charles Martin	(France) Mathieu Duval	1
(France) Renault Sport Racing Team 2	Renault Clio RS R3T	R3	M	(Spain) Surhayen Pernía	(Spain) Rogelio Peñate	1
(France) Renault Sport Racing Team 2	Renault Clio RS R3T	R3	M	(Italy) Luca Panzani	(Italy) Federico Grilli	1
(Italy) Vieffecorse	Peugeot 208 R2	R2	D	(Italy) Enrico Brazzoli	(Italy) Maurizio Barone	1, 4, 6, 10, 12
(Italy) Vieffecorse	Peugeot 208 R2	R2	D	(Italy) Enrico Brazzoli	(Italy) Enrico Ghietti	7
(France) CHL Sport Auto	Peugeot 208 R2	R2	M	(France) Raphaël Astier	(France) Frédéric Vauclare	1, 4, 6, 8, 10–12
(United Kingdom) Relly Team GB	Ford Fiesta R2	R2	M	(United Kingdom) Louise Cook	(United Kingdom) Stefan Davis	2
(France) BPS Racing	Citroën DS3 R3T	R3	M	(France) Loïc Astier	(France) Loïc Declerck	4
(Poland) Go+Cars Atlas Ward	Citroën DS3 R3T	R3	M	(Poland) Jakub Brzeziński	(Poland) Szymon Marciniak	4
(Poland) Go+Cars Atlas Ward	Citroën DS3 R3T	R3	M	(Poland) Jakub Brzeziński	(Poland) Robert Hundla	6–9
(Mexico) Name Rua Racing	Citroën DS3 R3T	R3	M	(Mexico) Francisco Name	(Mexico) Armando Zapata	6–8
(United Kingdom) M-Sport	Ford Fiesta R2T	R2	D	(Spain) Nil Solans	(Spain) Miquel Ibáñez	4, 6–11
(United Kingdom) M-Sport	Ford Fiesta R2T	R2	D	(France) Terry Folb	(France) Christopher Guieu	4, 7–11
(United Kingdom) M-Sport	Ford Fiesta R2T	R2	D	(France) Nicolas Ciamin	(France) Thibault de la Haye	4, 6–11
(United Kingdom) M-Sport	Ford Fiesta R2T	R2	D	(Republic of Ireland) Robert Duggan	(Republic of Ireland) Gerard Conway	4
(United Kingdom) M-Sport	Ford Fiesta R2T	R2	D	(Republic of Ireland) Robert Duggan	(United Kingdom) Tom Woodburn	7–8
(United Kingdom) M-Sport	Ford Fiesta R2T	R2	D	(Belgium) William Wagner	(France) Kévin Parent	4
(United Kingdom) M-Sport	Ford Fiesta R2T	R2	D	(United States) Dillon van Way	(United Kingdom) Dai Roberts	4, 7–10
(United Kingdom) M-Sport	Ford Fiesta R2T	R2	D	(Sweden) Dennis Rådström	(Sweden) Johan Johansson	4, 7–9, 11
(United Kingdom) M-Sport	Ford Fiesta R2T	R2	D	(Bolivia) Sebastian Careaga	(Argentina) Claudio Bustos	4
(United Kingdom) M-Sport	Ford Fiesta R2T	R2	D	(Bolivia) Sebastian Careaga	(Spain) Rodrigo Sanjuan	7–10
(United Kingdom) M-Sport	Ford Fiesta R2T	R2	D	(Finland) Emil Lindholm	(Finland) Tomi Tuominen	8–9
(Germany) ADAC Sachsen	Ford Fiesta R2T	R2	D	(Germany) Julius Tannert	(Austria) Jürgen Heigl	4, 7–11
(Estonia) Cueks Racing	Ford Fiesta R2T	R2	D	(Estonia) Miko-Ove Niinemäe	(Estonia) Martin Valter	4, 7–8

Key
Icon	Class
R2	Classification within Group R
R3	Classification within Group R

== Season report ==
The season started with the Rallye Monte Carlo. In the category, there were six entries, including four by Renault Sport. The rally was won from start to end by Raphaël Astier, winning by more than nine minutes over the rest of the crews. The podium was completed by Renault's Luca Panzani and Charles Martin.

Louise Cook was the sole entrant for Rally Sweden in the category. She had to retire after losing the bumper of her car before the Colin's Crest jump during the second pass over the Vargåsen stage. She was able to re-assemble the car, but an homologation problem in the spare seat brackets, made her unable to start the final leg of the rally, leaving the category with no winner.

After there were no entries in Rally Mexico, the action continued Tour de Corse, which also featured the first round of the Junior WRC championship. Raphaël Astier lead the event from start to finish, winning the event by almost a minute and a half from Junior entrant Nil Solans. The podium was completed by local Nicolas Ciamin, who claimed to that position after a driveshaft problem prevented fellow Frenchman Terry Folb the means to finish in the podium.

== Results and standings ==
=== Season summary ===
Round	Event name	Winning driver	Winning co-driver	Winning entry	Winning car	Winning time	Report
1	(Monaco) Rallye Monte Carlo	(France) Raphaël Astier	(France) Frédéric Vauclare	(France) CHL Sport Auto	Peugeot 208 R2	4:39:55.8	Report
2	Rally Sweden	No WRC3 finishers					Report
3	Rally Mexico	No WRC3 entries					Report
4	(France) Tour de Corse	(France) Raphaël Astier	(France) Frédéric Vauclare	(France) CHL Sport Auto	Peugeot 208 R2	3:52:18.7	Report
5	Rally Argentina	No WRC3 entries					Report
6	Rally de Portugal	(Mexico) Francisco Name	(Mexico) Armando Zapata	(Mexico) Name-Rua Racing Team	Citroën DS3 R3T	4:37:20.7	Report
7	(Italy) Rally Italia Sardegna	(Spain) Nil Solans	(Spain) Miquel Ibáñez	(United Kingdom) M-Sport	Ford Fiesta R2T	4:00:07.8	Report
8	Rally Poland	(Spain) Nil Solans	(Spain) Miquel Ibáñez	(United Kingdom) M-Sport	Ford Fiesta R2T	3:17:47.0	Report
9	Rally Finland	(France) Nicolas Ciamin	(France) Thibault de la Haye	(United Kingdom) M-Sport	Ford Fiesta R2T	2:57:23.4	Report
10	(Germany) Rallye Deutschland	(Germany) Julius Tannert	(Austria) Jürgen Heigl	(Germany) ADAC Sachsen	Ford Fiesta R2T	3:30:54.4	Report
11	(Spain) Rally Catalunya	(Spain) Nil Solans	(Spain) Miquel Ibáñez	(United Kingdom) M-Sport	Ford Fiesta R2T	3:29:02.3	Report
12	(United Kingdom) Wales Rally GB	(France) Raphaël Astier	(France) Frédéric Vauclare	(France) CHL Sport Auto	Peugeot 208 R2	3:45:26.7	Report
13	Rally Australia	No WRC3 entries					Report

=== FIA WRC3 Championship for Drivers ===
Points are awarded to the top ten classified finishers.

Position	1st	2nd	3rd	4th	5th	6th	7th	8th	9th	10th
Points	25	18	15	12	10	8	6	4	2	1

Pos.	Driver	MON (Monaco)	SWE (Sweden)	MEX (Mexico)	FRA (France)	ARG (Argentina)	POR (Portugal)	ITA (Italy)	POL (Poland)	FIN (Finland)	GER (Germany)	ESP (Spain)	GBR (United Kingdom)	AUS (Australia)	Drops	Points
1	(Spain) Nil Solans				2		2	1	1	2	3	1			15	129
2	(France) Raphaël Astier	1			1		Ret		11		2	2	1		0	111
3	(France) Nicolas Ciamin				3		Ret	2	4	1	5	6			0	88
4	(Germany) Julius Tannert				5			3	6	4	1	4			0	82
5	(Sweden) Dennis Rådström				6			5	2	3		5			0	61
6	(France) Terry Folb				4			4	5	Ret	6	3			0	57
7	(Italy) Enrico Brazzoli	Ret					3	8			4		2		0	49
8	(Mexico) Francisco Name						1	DNS	8						0	29
9	(United States) Dillon Van Way				9			7	7	5	WD				0	24
10	(Italy) Luca Panzani	2													0	18
11	(Poland) Jakub Brzeziński				10		Ret	Ret	3	WD					0	16
12	(France) Charles Martin	3													0	15
13	(Republic of Ireland) Robert Duggan				7			6	WD						0	14
14	(Spain) Surhayen Pernía	4													0	12
15	(Bolivia) Sebastian Careaga				8			9	9	WD	WD				0	8
16	(Finland) Emil Lindholm								10	Ret					0	1
Pos.	Driver	MON (Monaco)	SWE (Sweden)	MEX (Mexico)	FRA (France)	ARG (Argentina)	POR (Portugal)	ITA (Italy)	POL (Poland)	FIN (Finland)	GER (Germany)	ESP (Spain)	GBR (United Kingdom)	AUS (Australia)	Drops	Points

Key
Colour	Result
Gold	Winner
Silver	2nd place
Bronze	3rd place
Green	Points finish
Blue	Non-points finish
Blue	Non-classified finish (NC)
Purple	Did not finish (Ret)
Black	Excluded (EX)
Black	Disqualified (DSQ)
White	Did not start (DNS)
White	Cancelled (C)
Blank	Withdrew entry from the event (WD)

=== FIA WRC3 Championship for Co-Drivers ===
Pos.	Co-driver	MON (Monaco)	SWE (Sweden)	MEX (Mexico)	FRA (France)	ARG (Argentina)	POR (Portugal)	ITA (Italy)	POL (Poland)	FIN (Finland)	GER (Germany)	ESP (Spain)	GBR (United Kingdom)	AUS (Australia)	Drops	Points
1	(Spain) Miquel Ibáñez				2		2	1	1	2	3	1			15	129
2	(France) Frédéric Vauclare	1			1		Ret		11		2	2	1		0	111
3	(France) Thibault de la Haye				3		Ret	2	4	1	5	6			0	88
4	(Austria) Jürgen Heigl				5			3	6	4	1	4			0	82
5	(Sweden) Johan Johansson				6			5	2	3		5			0	61
6	(France) Christopher Guieu				4			4	5	Ret	6	3			0	57
7	(Italy) Maurizio Barone	Ret					3				4		2		0	45
8	(Mexico) Armando Zapata						1	DNS	8						0	29
9	(United Kingdom) Dai Roberts				9			7	7	5	WD				0	24
10	(Italy) Federico Grilli	2													0	18
11	(Poland) Robert Hundla						Ret	Ret	3	WD					0	15
12	(France) Mathieu Duval	3													0	15
13	(Spain) Rogelio Peñate	4													0	12
14	(United Kingdom) Tom Woodburn							6	WD						0	8
15	(Republic of Ireland) Gerard Conway				7										0	6
16	(Argentina) Claudio Bustos				8										0	4
17	(Italy) Enrico Ghietti							8							0	4
18	(Spain) Rodrigo Sanjuan							9	9	WD	WD				0	4
19	(Poland) Szymon Marciniak				10										0	1
20	(Finland) Tomi Tuominen								10	Ret					0	1
Pos.	Co-driver	MON (Monaco)	SWE (Sweden)	MEX (Mexico)	FRA (France)	ARG (Argentina)	POR (Portugal)	ITA (Italy)	POL (Poland)	FIN (Finland)	GER (Germany)	ESP (Spain)	GBR (United Kingdom)	AUS (Australia)	Drops	Points

Key
Colour	Result
Gold	Winner
Silver	2nd place
Bronze	3rd place
Green	Points finish
Blue	Non-points finish
Blue	Non-classified finish (NC)
Purple	Did not finish (Ret)
Black	Excluded (EX)
Black	Disqualified (DSQ)
White	Did not start (DNS)
White	Cancelled (C)
Blank	Withdrew entry from the event (WD)

=== FIA WRC3 Championship for Teams ===
Pos.	Team	MON (Monaco)	SWE (Sweden)	MEX (Mexico)	FRA (France)	ARG (Argentina)	POR (Portugal)	ITA (Italy)	POL (Poland)	FIN (Finland)	GER (Germany)	ESP (Spain)	GBR (United Kingdom)	AUS (Australia)	Points
1	(Germany) ADAC Sachsen				1			1	2	1	1	1			143
2	(Poland) Go+Cars Atlas Ward				2		Ret	Ret	1	WD					43
3	(Mexico) Name-Rua Racing Team						1	DNS	3						40
4	(France) Renault Sport Racing Team 2	1													25
5	(France) Renault Sport Racing Team	2													18
6	(Estonia) Cueks Racing				3			Ret	WD						15
Pos.	Team	MON (Monaco)	SWE (Sweden)	MEX (Mexico)	FRA (France)	ARG (Argentina)	POR (Portugal)	ITA (Italy)	POL (Poland)	FIN (Finland)	GER (Germany)	ESP (Spain)	GBR (United Kingdom)	AUS (Australia)	Points

Key
Colour	Result
Gold	Winner
Silver	2nd place
Bronze	3rd place
Green	Points finish
Blue	Non-points finish
Blue	Non-classified finish (NC)
Purple	Did not finish (Ret)
Black	Excluded (EX)
Black	Disqualified (DSQ)
White	Did not start (DNS)
White	Cancelled (C)
Blank	Withdrew entry from the event (WD)
