= Anders Grøndal =

Norwegian rally driver (born 1984)

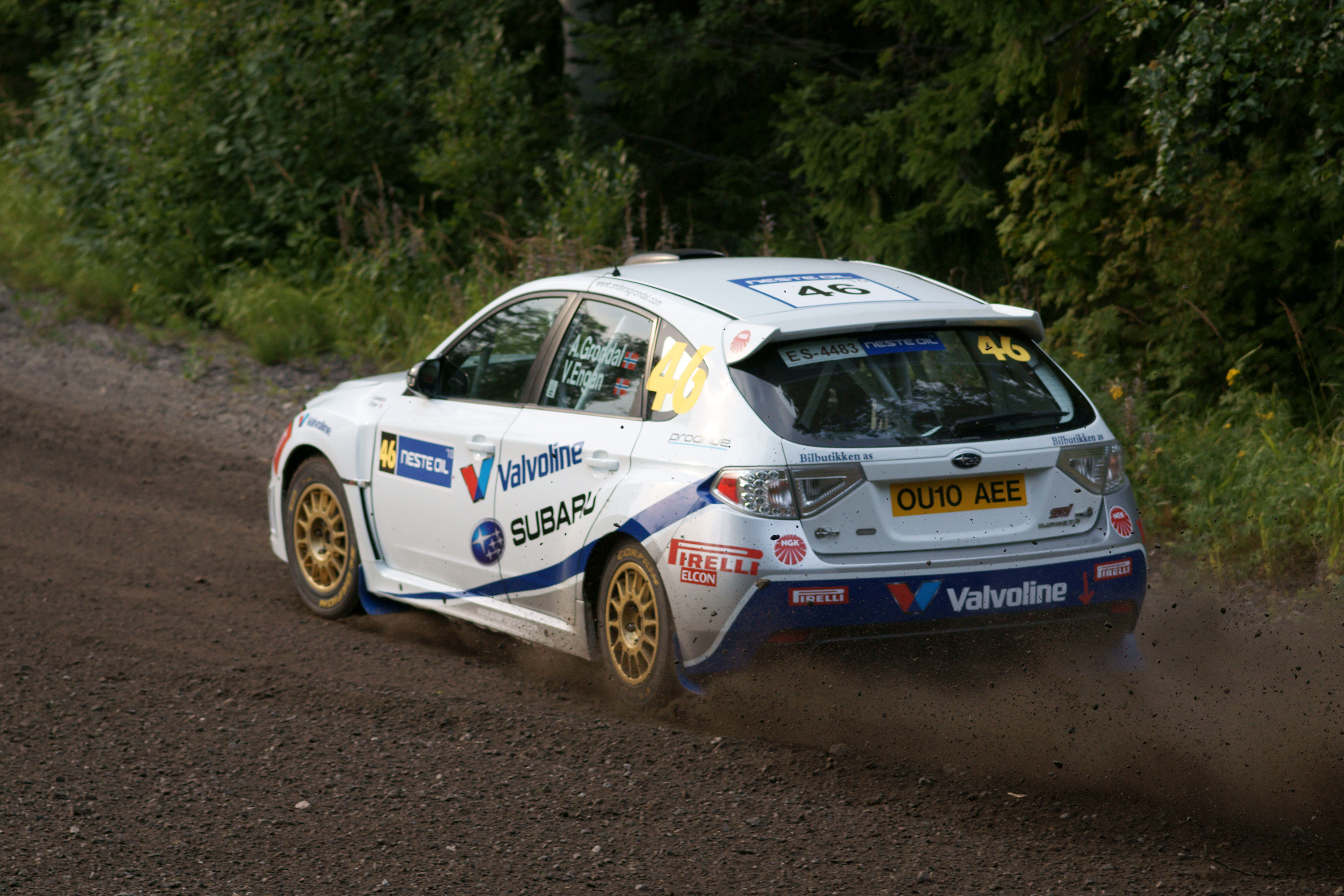

Personal information
- Nationality: (Norway) Norwegian
- Born: March 4, 1984 (age 42)

World Rally Championship record
- Years active: 2006 – present
- Co-driver: (Norway) Trond-Inge Østbye (Sweden) Maria Andersson (Norway) Veronica Gulbæk Engen (Norway) Trond Svendsen (Norway) Roger Eilertsen (Sweden) Miriam Walfridsson
- Teams: Adapta AS, Bilbutikken AS WRT
- Rallies: 19
- Championships: 0
- Rally wins: 0
- Podiums: 0
- Stage wins: 0
- Total points: 0
- First rally: 2004 Swedish Rally
- Last rally: 2017 Rally Sweden

Anders Grøndal (born 4 March 1984) is a Norwegian rally and hill climb driver. He has won at least 5 gold medals, 3 silver, and 2 bronze at the Norwegian championships. In 2019, he and co-driver Marius Fuglerud won the Rally Tron in the Ford Fiesta MK2.

Grøndal is the third generation rally driver in his family. He grew up with motorsport. His grandfather Nils Fredrik Grøndal and father Stein Grøndal were active rally and rally cross drivers. His uncle Knut Fredrik Grøndal was also a Norwegian hill climb champion.

== 2002 ==
In 2002, Grøndal and the team visited former works driver John Hauglands Rally School to see what the level was in which they could compete. After doing several tests and John Haugland recognizing the potential Grøndal had, the team decided to buy a Subaru Impreza STi and aim to reach to top of Group N within 3 years, starting in the 2003 season.

== 2003 ==
The first year of rally for Bilbutikken WRT (Subaru jr Team) with a Subaru Impreza STi built by Rune Dalsjø Rally Team. Henning Elvekrok was the team's first co-driver. Grøndal and Elvekrok won their first Group N victory in Rally Sørland 2003. During the season, Subaru Norway already had Morten Østberg in WRC as their senior team and wanted a young team in their Gr.N Subaru. Elvekrok was therefore replaced with younger co-driver Trond Inge Østbye in the middle of the season. Grøndal took his first championship points in Aurskog Høland Rally 2003. The team ended the season third in the Subaru Cup.

== 2004 ==
For the 2004 season Bilbutikken WRT (Subaru jr team in 2004) bought their first brand new Subaru Rally car from Prodrive. The N9 car proved to be much quicker than the Norwegian build 2001 car the team used in 2003. Grøndal and Trond Inge won their first overall victory in a non-championship rally called Eidskogsprinten. They also achieved their first fastest stage time in a championship round. In 2004, Grøndal and Trond Inge also did their first WRC round in Sweden.

== 2005 ==
In 2005 the team got the Subaru Impreza N11 2005 Group N car. It was the first N11 to be built and the car therefore experienced a lot of problems, so the team had to fall back to the N9 car in the beginning of the season. During the season the problems with the N11 car were fixed and Anders achieved his goal of winning a championship round in three 3 years when he won the 2005 Rally Hedemarken. In 2005 they also competed in a few hill climb races achieving a silver medal in the championship.

== 2006 ==
The team got the Subaru Impreza WRC 2004 SWRT that Petter Solberg used in Monte Carlo and Swedish rally 2005 (WT53 SRT) the car was re-registered to KF81149 when it got to Norway. The team had the best start to the season with overall win in the first Norwegian rally championship round in Mountain Rally. This was Grøndal and Inge's first overall win in the Norwegian championship! The next event was the trial event for WRC Rally Norway. A third place overall in the rally was a good result for the team. The team was in the fight for the title for most of the season, but the young team was to eager and crashed in the final rallies and ended at a disappointing 5th overall.

== 2007 ==
The 2007 season gave the team 10 total victories. And a podium finish in every other rally they finished. Overall in the Norwegian championship, Grøndal ended up third behind Mads Østberg and Thomas Schie. This was the first year Grøndal did the full hill climb season. It was a great season where Grøndal set hill records in all but one hill. Here, he won its first Norwegian championship gold medal. This was the last year Inge Østbye was co-driving for the team. He was replaced mid-season by earlier Norwegian champion for co-drivers Ragnar Engen and X jr world champion Jonas Anderson.

== 2008 ==
In the 2008 season, Grøndal crashed his Subaru Impreza WRC in a hill climb rally. The team therefore had to borrow a car from another driver, that car failed with an engine problem in Aurskog, ending all hopes for a championship title.

== 2009 ==
Grøndal wasn't very lucky in the 2009 rally season, in the first rally they had to retire on the second stage after a miscommunication with the co-driver. At the second rally, the first teams on the track were challenged by a snow blizzard, slowing them down. The 2009 rally season was ended with a 4th position overall. In the hill climb competition, the team had more luck and won all races and ended with the golden medal. Another good victory was the golden medal in the WRC tarmac cup.

== 2010 ==
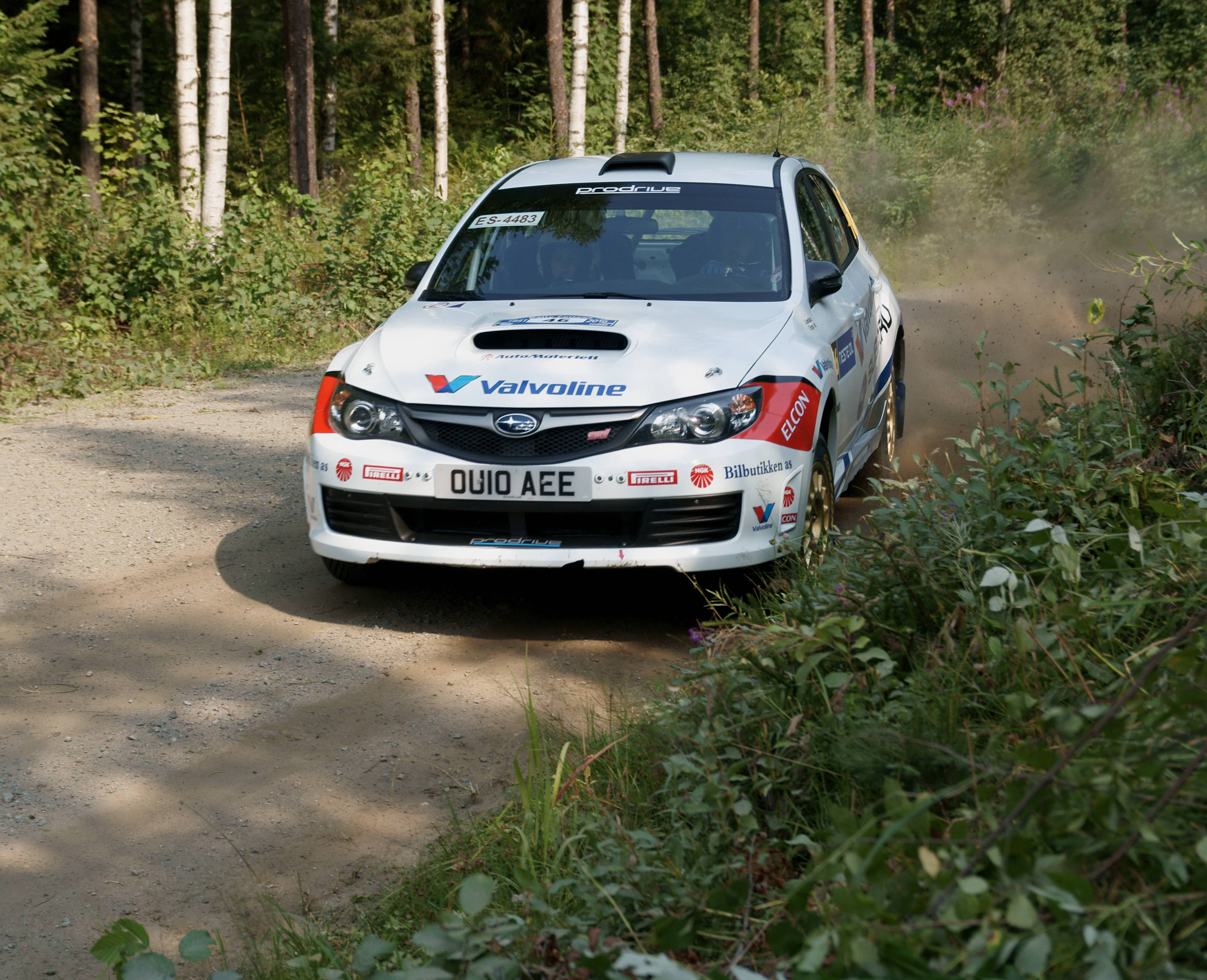
Grondal at 2010 Rally Finland with Subaru Impreza WRX STi.

During this season for Grøndal when looking at the results: Norwegian champion in Rally and Hill climb, driving 4 PWRC rounds and winning the PWRC stage on tarmac in France.

On a personal level, Grøndal was less lucky when he broke his back during the rally of Stavanger, after he recovered he was 1.5 cm shorter. This was the worst crash in Grøndal's rally career.

== 2011 ==
In this season he won all Norwegian champion hill climb events, winning all heats in every event for third year in a row and is unbeaten in 46 heats in a row. He won silver in the Norwegian Rally championship, and won three events (Sigdalsrally, Rally Hadeland and Aurskog Høland. Leading PWRC events for the first time in Sweden and Portugal. He won 8 out of 11 stages in Sweden before having to retire with engine failure.

== Career results ==
=== WRC results ===
Year	Entrant	Car	1	2	3	4	5	6	7	8	9	10	11	12	13	14	15	16	Pos.	Points
2004	Anders Grøndal	Subaru Impreza STi	MON	SWE; 31	MEX	NZL	CYP	GRE	TUR	ARG	FIN	GER	JPN	GBR	ITA	FRA	ESP	AUS	NC	0
2005	Anders Grøndal	Subaru Impreza STi	MON	SWE; Ret	MEX	NZL	ITA	CYP	TUR	GRE	ARG	FIN	GER	GBR	JPN	FRA	ESP	AUS	NC	0
2006	Anders Grøndal	Subaru Impreza WRC 04	MON	SWE; Ret	MEX	ESP	FRA	ARG	ITA	GRE	GER	FIN	JPN	CYP	TUR	AUS	NZL	GBR	NC	0
2007	Anders Grøndal	Subaru Impreza WRC 04	MON	SWE	NOR; Ret	MEX	POR	ARG	ITA	GRE	FIN	GER	NZL	ESP	FRA	JPN	IRE	GBR	NC	0
2009	Adapta AS	Subaru Impreza WRC 08	IRE	NOR; 14	CYP	POR	ARG	ITA	GRE	POL	FIN	AUS	ESP	GBR					NC	0
2010	Anders Grøndal	Subaru Impreza STi N15	SWE; 20																NC	0
2010	Anders Grøndal WRC RT	Subaru Impreza STi		MEX	JOR	TUR	NZL	POR	BUL	FIN; 24	GER	JPN	FRA; 29	ESP	GBR; 39				NC	0
2011	Bilbutikken AS WRT	Subaru Impreza STi	SWE; Ret	MEX	POR; Ret	JOR	ITA	ARG	GRE	FIN	GER	AUS	FRA	ESP	GBR				NC	0
2012	Anders Grøndal	Subaru Impreza STi	MON	SWE; 22	MEX	POR	ARG	GRE	NZL	FIN	GER	GBR	FRA	ITA	ESP				NC	0
2013	Anders Grøndal	Subaru Impreza STi N16	MON	SWE; 11	MEX	POR	ARG	GRE	ITA	FIN	GER	AUS	FRA	ESP	GBR				NC	0
2014	Anders Grøndal	Subaru Impreza STi N16	MON	SWE; Ret	MEX	POR	ARG	ITA	POL	FIN	GER	AUS	FRA	ESP	GBR				NC	0
2015	Anders Grøndal	Citroën DS3 R5	MON	SWE; 26	MEX	ARG	POR; Ret	ITA	POL	FIN; 15	GER	AUS	FRA	ESP	GBR				NC	0
2016	Anders Grøndal	Ford Fiesta R5	MON	SWE; 13	MEX	ARG	POR	ITA	POL	FIN	GER	CHN	FRA	ESP	GBR	AUS			NC	0
2017	Anders Grøndal	Ford Fiesta R5	MON	SWE; Ret	MEX	FRA	ARG	POR	ITA	POL	FIN	GER	ESP	GBR	AUS				NC	0

==== PWRC results ====
Year	Entrant	Car	1	2	3	4	5	6	7	8	9	Pos.	Points
2010	Anders Grøndal	Subaru Impreza STi N15	SWE; 2									7th	40
2010	Anders Grøndal WRC RT	Subaru Impreza STi		MEX	JOR	NZL	FIN; 4	GER	JPN	FRA; 5	GBR; 13	7th	40
2011	Bilbutikken AS WRT	Subaru Impreza STi	SWE; Ret	POR; Ret	ARG	FIN	AUS	ESP	GBR			NC	0

==== WRC-2 results ====
Year	Entrant	Car	1	2	3	4	5	6	7	8	9	10	11	12	13	Pos.	Points
2013	Anders Grøndal	Subaru Impreza STi N16	MON	SWE; 2	MEX	POR	ARG	GRE	ITA	FIN	GER	AUS	FRA	ESP	GBR	18th	18
2014	Anders Grøndal	Subaru Impreza STi N16	MON	SWE; Ret	MEX	POR	ARG	ITA	POL	FIN	GER	AUS	FRA	ESP	GBR	NC	0
2015	Anders Grøndal	Citroën DS3 R5	MON	SWE; 10	MEX	ARG	POR	ITA	POL	FIN	GER	AUS	FRA	ESP	GBR	26th*	1*

* Season still in progress.
