= 2017 Rally Sweden =

Motor rally competition

2017 Rally Sweden: 65. Rally Sweden 2017
Round 2 of the 2017 World Rally Championship
← Previous event	Next event →
- Host country: Sweden
- Rally base: (Sweden) Torsby, Värmland
- Dates run: 9 – 12 February 2017
- Stages: 17 (305.83 km; 190.03 miles)
- Stage surface: Snow

Statistics
- Crews: 41 at start, 32 at finish

Overall results
- Overall winner: (Finland) Jari-Matti Latvala (Finland) Miikka Anttila (Japan) Toyota Gazoo Racing WRT

The 2017 Rally Sweden (formally known as the Rally Sweden 2017) was a motor racing event for rally cars that was held over three days between 10 and 12 February 2017. It marked the sixty-fifth running of the Rally Sweden, and was the second round of the 2017 World Rally Championship and the WRC-2 and WRC-3 championships.

Toyota's driver Jari-Matti Latvala won the rally ahead of M-Sport drivers Ott Tänak and Sébastien Ogier who finished second and third, respectively. The win for Toyota was their first after their return to the WRC after a 17 year absence.

Latvala had inherited the lead after rally leader Thierry Neuville had crashed out on the final stage of leg 2. The Belgian had a lead of 43.3 seconds before ripping a wheel off in the second run of the Karlstad stage, promoting Latvala to first place.

Local driver Pontus Tidemand won the WRC-2 category, finishing ahead of Teemu Suninen.

== Entry list ==
Notable entrants
No.	Entrant	Class	Driver	Co-driver	Car	Tyre
1	(United Kingdom) M-Sport World Rally Team	WRC	(France) Sébastien Ogier	(France) Julien Ingrassia	Ford Fiesta WRC	M
2	(United Kingdom) M-Sport World Rally Team	WRC	(Estonia) Ott Tänak	(Estonia) Martin Järveoja	Ford Fiesta WRC	M
3	(United Kingdom) M-Sport World Rally Team	WRC	(United Kingdom) Elfyn Evans	(United Kingdom) Daniel Barritt	Ford Fiesta WRC	D
4	(South Korea) Hyundai Motorsport	WRC	(New Zealand) Hayden Paddon	(New Zealand) John Kennard	Hyundai i20 Coupe WRC	M
5	(South Korea) Hyundai Motorsport	WRC	(Belgium) Thierry Neuville	(Belgium) Nicolas Gilsoul	Hyundai i20 Coupe WRC	M
6	(South Korea) Hyundai Motorsport	WRC	(Spain) Dani Sordo	(Spain) Marc Martí	Hyundai i20 Coupe WRC	M
7	(France) Citroën Total Abu Dhabi WRT	WRC	(United Kingdom) Kris Meeke	(Republic of Ireland) Paul Nagle	Citroën C3 WRC	M
8	(France) Citroën Total Abu Dhabi WRT	WRC	(Republic of Ireland) Craig Breen	(United Kingdom) Scott Martin	Citroën C3 WRC	M
10	(Japan) Toyota Gazoo Racing WRT	WRC	(Finland) Jari-Matti Latvala	(Finland) Miikka Anttila	Toyota Yaris WRC	M
11	(Japan) Toyota Gazoo Racing WRT	WRC	(Finland) Juho Hänninen	(Finland) Kaj Lindström	Toyota Yaris WRC	M
14	(United Kingdom) M-Sport World Rally Team	WRC	(Norway) Mads Østberg	(Norway) Ola Fløene	Ford Fiesta WRC	M
15	(France) Citroën Total Abu Dhabi WRT	WRC	(France) Stéphane Lefebvre	(France) Gabin Moreau	Citroën DS3 WRC	M
16	(Ukraine) Eurolamp World Rally Team	WRC	(Ukraine) Valeriy Gorban	(Estonia) Sergei Larens	Mini John Cooper Works WRC	M
37	(Italy) FWRT	WRC	(Italy) Lorenzo Bertelli	(Italy) Simone Scattolin	Ford Fiesta RS WRC	M

Key
Icon	Class
WRC	WRC entries eligible to score manufacturer points
WRC	Major entry ineligible to score manufacturer points
WRC	Registered to score points in WRC Trophy
WRC-2	Registered to take part in WRC-2 championship
WRC-3	Registered to take part in WRC-3 championship

== Classification ==
=== Event standings ===
Pos.	No.	Driver	Co-driver	Team	Car	Class	Time	Difference	Points
Overall classification
1	10	(Finland) Jari-Matti Latvala	(Finland) Miikka Anttila	(Japan) Toyota Gazoo Racing WRT	Toyota Yaris WRC	WRC	2:36:03.6	0.0	30
2	2	(Estonia) Ott Tänak	(Estonia) Martin Järveoja	(United Kingdom) M-Sport World Rally Team	Ford Fiesta WRC	WRC	2:36:32.8	+29.2	18
3	1	(France) Sébastien Ogier	(France) Julien Ingrassia	(United Kingdom) M-Sport World Rally Team	Ford Fiesta WRC	WRC	2:37:03.1	+59.5	19
4	6	(Spain) Dani Sordo	(Spain) Marc Martí	(South Korea) Hyundai Motorsport	Hyundai i20 Coupe WRC	WRC	2:38:15.1	+2:11.5	12
5	8	(Republic of Ireland) Craig Breen	(United Kingdom) Scott Martin	(France) Citroën Total Abu Dhabi WRT	Citroën C3 WRC	WRC	2:38:54.8	+2:51.2	10
6	3	(United Kingdom) Elfyn Evans	(United Kingdom) Daniel Barritt	(United Kingdom) M-Sport World Rally Team	Ford Fiesta WRC	WRC	2:41:30.2	+5:26.6	8
7	4	(New Zealand) Hayden Paddon	(New Zealand) John Kennard	(South Korea) Hyundai Motorsport	Hyundai i20 Coupe WRC	WRC	2:41:34.8	+5:31.2	7
8	15	(France) Stéphane Lefebvre	(France) Gabin Moreau	(France) Citroën Total Abu Dhabi WRT	Citroën DS3 WRC	WRC	2:43:18.3	+7:14.7	4
9	32	(Sweden) Pontus Tidemand	(Sweden) Jonas Andersson	(Czech Republic) Škoda Motorsport	Škoda Fabia R5	WRC-2	2:45:14.7	+9:11.1	2
10	31	(Finland) Teemu Suninen	(Finland) Mikko Markkula	(United Kingdom) M-Sport World Rally Team	Ford Fiesta R5	WRC-2	2:46:06.5	+10:02.9	1
12	7	(United Kingdom) Kris Meeke	(Republic of Ireland) Paul Nagle	(France) Citroën Total Abu Dhabi WRT	Citroën C3 WRC	WRC	2:46:32.3	+10:28.7	2
13	5	(Belgium) Thierry Neuville	(Belgium) Nicolas Gilsoul	(South Korea) Hyundai Motorsport	Hyundai i20 Coupe WRC	WRC	2:47:35.1	+11:31.5	3
WRC-2 standings
1 (9.)	32	(Sweden) Pontus Tidemand	(Sweden) Jonas Andersson	(Czech Republic) Škoda Motorsport	Škoda Fabia R5	WRC-2	2:45:14.7		25
2 (10.)	31	(Finland) Teemu Suninen	(Finland) Mikko Markkula	(United Kingdom) M-Sport World Rally Team	Ford Fiesta R5	WRC-2	2:46:06.5	+51.8	18
3 (11.)	34	(Norway) Ole Christian Veiby	(Norway) Stig Rune Skjærmoen	(Finland) Printsport Oy	Škoda Fabia R5	WRC-2	2:46:22.1	+1:07.4	15
4 (14.)	40	(France) Eric Camilli	(France) Benjamin Veillas	(United Kingdom) M-Sport World Rally Team	Ford Fiesta R5	WRC-2	2:48:27.1	+3:12.4	12

=== Special stages ===
Day	Stage	Name	Length	Winner	Car	Time	Rally leader
Leg 1 (9–10 Feb)	SS1	(Sweden) Super Special Stage Karlstad 1	1.90 km	(Finland) Jari-Matti Latvala	Toyota Yaris WRC	1:34.1	(Finland) Jari-Matti Latvala
Leg 1 (9–10 Feb)	SS2	(Sweden) / (Norway) Röjden 1	18.47 km	(Belgium) Thierry Neuville	Hyundai i20 Coupe WRC	9:37.3	(Belgium) Thierry Neuville
Leg 1 (9–10 Feb)	SS3	(Norway) Hof-Finnskog 1	21.26 km	(Belgium) Thierry Neuville	Hyundai i20 Coupe WRC	10:10.3	(Belgium) Thierry Neuville
Leg 1 (9–10 Feb)	SS4	(Norway) Svullrya 1	24.88 km	(Finland) Jari-Matti Latvala	Toyota Yaris WRC	12:52.3	(Finland) Jari-Matti Latvala
Leg 1 (9–10 Feb)	SS5	(Sweden) / (Norway) Röjden 2	18.47 km	(Belgium) Thierry Neuville	Hyundai i20 Coupe WRC	9:25.7	(Belgium) Thierry Neuville
Leg 1 (9–10 Feb)	SS6	(Norway) Hof-Finnskog 2	21.26 km	(Belgium) Thierry Neuville	Hyundai i20 Coupe WRC	10:06.4	(Belgium) Thierry Neuville
Leg 1 (9–10 Feb)	SS7	(Norway) Svullrya 2	24.88 km	(Belgium) Thierry Neuville	Hyundai i20 Coupe WRC	13:04.0	(Belgium) Thierry Neuville
Leg 1 (9–10 Feb)	SS8	(Sweden) Torsby 1	16.43 km	(Estonia) Ott Tänak	Ford Fiesta WRC	9:24.8	(Belgium) Thierry Neuville
Leg 2 (11 Feb)	SS9	(Sweden) Knon 1	31.60 km	(Estonia) Ott Tänak	Ford Fiesta WRC	13:45.5	(Belgium) Thierry Neuville
Leg 2 (11 Feb)	SS10	(Sweden) Hagfors 1	15.87 km	(Estonia) Ott Tänak	Ford Fiesta WRC	8:03.0	(Belgium) Thierry Neuville
Leg 2 (11 Feb)	SS11	(Sweden) Vargåsen 1	14.27 km	(Estonia) Ott Tänak	Ford Fiesta WRC	8:20.7	(Belgium) Thierry Neuville
Leg 2 (11 Feb)	SS12	(Sweden) Knon 2	31.60 km	Stage cancelled			
Leg 2 (11 Feb)	SS13	(Sweden) Hagfors 2	15.87 km	(Finland) Jari-Matti Latvala	Toyota Yaris WRC	7:50.9	(Belgium) Thierry Neuville
Leg 2 (11 Feb)	SS14	(Sweden) Vargåsen 2	14.27 km	(Belgium) Thierry Neuville	Hyundai i20 Coupe WRC	8:07.5	(Belgium) Thierry Neuville
Leg 2 (11 Feb)	SS15	(Sweden) Super Special Stage Karlstad 2	1.90 km	(Spain) Dani Sordo	Hyundai i20 Coupe WRC	1:33.9	(Finland) Jari-Matti Latvala
Leg 3 (12 Feb)	SS16	(Sweden) Likenäs 1	21.19 km	(Finland) Jari-Matti Latvala	Toyota Yaris WRC	11:06.9	(Finland) Jari-Matti Latvala
Leg 3 (12 Feb)	SS17	(Sweden) Likenäs 2	21.19 km	(Finland) Jari-Matti Latvala	Toyota Yaris WRC	11:06.3	(Finland) Jari-Matti Latvala
Leg 3 (12 Feb)	SS18	(Sweden) Torsby 2 [Power Stage]	16.43 km	(Finland) Jari-Matti Latvala	Toyota Yaris WRC	8:51.1	(Finland) Jari-Matti Latvala

=== Power Stage ===
The Power Stage was a 16.43 km (10.2 mi) stage at the end of the rally.

Pos.	Driver	Co-driver	Car	Time	Diff.	Pts.
1	(Finland) Jari-Matti Latvala	(Finland) Miikka Anttila	Toyota Yaris WRC	8:51.1		5
2	(France) Sébastien Ogier	(France) Julien Ingrassia	Ford Fiesta WRC	8:52.3	+1.2	4
3	(Belgium) Thierry Neuville	(Belgium) Nicolas Gilsoul	Hyundai i20 Coupe WRC	8:52.6	+1.5	3
4	(United Kingdom) Kris Meeke	(Republic of Ireland) Paul Nagle	Citroën C3 WRC	8:54.1	+3.0	2
5	(New Zealand) Hayden Paddon	(New Zealand) John Kennard	Hyundai i20 Coupe WRC	8:58.8	+7.7	1

=== Championship standings after the rally ===
Drivers' Championship standings

	Pos.	Driver	Points
1	1	(Finland) Jari-Matti Latvala	48
1	2	(France) Sébastien Ogier	44
	3	(Estonia) Ott Tänak	33
	4	(Spain) Dani Sordo	25
	5	(Republic of Ireland) Craig Breen	20

Manufacturers' Championship standings

Pos.	Manufacturer	Points
1	(United Kingdom) M-Sport World Rally Team	73
2	(Japan) Toyota Gazoo Racing WRT	53
3	(South Korea) Hyundai Motorsport	40
4	(France) Citroën Total Abu Dhabi WRT	26
