= 2016 Rally Sweden =

Motor racing event in Sweden

2016 Rally Sweden: 64. Rally Sweden
Round 2 of the 2016 World Rally Championship
← Previous event	Next event →
- Host country: Sweden
- Rally base: (Sweden) Karlstad, Värmland
- Dates run: 12 – 14 February 2016
- Stages: 12 (226.48 km; 140.73 miles)
- Stage surface: Snow, ice and gravel

Statistics
- Crews: 50 at start, 38 at finish

Overall results
- Overall winner: (France) Sébastien Ogier (France) Julien Ingrassia (Germany) Volkswagen Motorsport

The 2016 Rally Sweden (formally known as the 64. Rally Sweden) was a motor racing event for rally cars that was held over three days between 12 and 14 February 2016. It marked the sixty-fourth running of the Rally Sweden, and was the second round of the 2016 World Rally Championship, WRC-2 and WRC-3 seasons.

Due to a lack of snow in the area, eight Special Stages were cancelled prior to the start of the rally, including the opening Super Special stage and all of day three stages apart from the final Power Stage. The penultimate stage, SS20, was cancelled during the event. Of the 21 scheduled stages, only 12 were run.

Defending World Champion Sébastien Ogier started won his second consecutive rally of the season and his third Rally Sweden victory.

== Entry list ==
Notable entrants
No.	Entrant	Class	Driver	Co-driver	Car	Tyre
1	(Germany) Volkswagen Motorsport	WRC	(France) Sébastien Ogier	(France) Julien Ingrassia	Volkswagen Polo R WRC	MI
2	(Germany) Volkswagen Motorsport	WRC	(Finland) Jari-Matti Latvala	(Finland) Miikka Anttila	Volkswagen Polo R WRC	MI
3	(Germany) Hyundai Motorsport	WRC	(Belgium) Thierry Neuville	(Belgium) Nicolas Gilsoul	Hyundai i20 WRC	MI
4	(Germany) Hyundai Motorsport	WRC	(New Zealand) Hayden Paddon	(New Zealand) John Kennard	Hyundai i20 WRC	MI
5	(United Kingdom) M-Sport World Rally Team	WRC	(Norway) Mads Østberg	(United Kingdom) Daniel Barritt	Ford Fiesta RS WRC	MI
6	(United Kingdom) M-Sport World Rally Team	WRC	(France) Eric Camilli	(France) Nicolas Klinger	Ford Fiesta RS WRC	MI
7	(France) Abu Dhabi Total World Rally Team	WRC	(United Kingdom) Kris Meeke	(Republic of Ireland) Paul Nagle	Citroën DS3 WRC	MI
9	(Germany) Volkswagen Motorsport II	WRC	(Norway) Andreas Mikkelsen	(Norway) Anders Jæger	Volkswagen Polo R WRC	MI
12	(United Kingdom) DMACK World Rally Team	WRC	(Estonia) Ott Tänak	(Estonia) Raigo Mõlder	Ford Fiesta RS WRC	DM
14	(France) Abu Dhabi Total World Rally Team	WRC	(United Arab Emirates) Khalid Al Qassimi	(United Kingdom) Chris Patterson	Citroën DS3 WRC	MI
15	(France) Abu Dhabi Total World Rally Team	WRC	(Republic of Ireland) Craig Breen	(United Kingdom) Scott Martin	Citroën DS3 WRC	MI
16	(Norway) Adapta Motorsport	WRC	(Norway) Henning Solberg	(Austria) Ilka Minor	Ford Fiesta RS WRC	MI
20	(Germany) Hyundai Motorsport N	WRC	(Spain) Dani Sordo	(Spain) Marc Martí	Hyundai i20 WRC	MI
30	(Saudi Arabia) Yazeed Racing	WRC	(Saudi Arabia) Yazeed Al Rahji	(United Kingdom) Michael Orr	Ford Fiesta RS WRC	P
31	(Czech Republic) Škoda Motorsport	WRC-2	(Finland) Esapekka Lappi	(Finland) Janne Ferm	Škoda Fabia R5	MI
32	(Czech Republic) Škoda Motorsport	WRC-2	(Sweden) Pontus Tidemand	(Sweden) Jonas Andersson	Škoda Fabia R5	MI
34	(United Kingdom) M-Sport World Rally Team	WRC-2	(Norway) Eyvind Brynildsen	(Sweden) Anders Fredriksen	Ford Fiesta R5	MI
35	(Italy) Motorsport Italia Srl	WRC-2	(Italy) Max Rendina	(Italy) Emanuele Inglesi	Ford Fiesta R5	P
36	(Sweden) Fredrik Åhlin	WRC-2	(Sweden) Fredrik Åhlin	(Norway) Morten Erik Abrahamsen	Ford Fiesta R5	MI
37	(Italy) FWRT s.r.l.	WRC	(Italy) Lorenzo Bertelli	(Italy) Simone Scattolin	Ford Fiesta RS WRC	P
38	(Romania) Napoca Rally Academy	WRC-2	(Italy) Simone Tempestini	(Italy) Matteo Chiarcossi	Ford Fiesta R5	P
39	(France) Alain Foulon	WRC-2	(France) Alain Foulon	(France) Gilles Delarche	Mitsubishi Lancer Evolution X	MI
40	(United Kingdom) Drive DMACK Trophy Team	WRC-2	(Estonia) Sander Pärn	(United Kingdom) James Morgan	Ford Fiesta R5	DM
42	(Poland) The Ptock	WRC-2	(Poland) Hubert Ptaszek	(Poland) Maciek Szczepaniak	Škoda Fabia R5	P
43	(Russia) TAIF Motorsport	WRC-2	(Russia) Radik Shaymiev	(Russia) Maxim Tzvetkov	Ford Fiesta R5	MI
44	(United Kingdom) M-Sport World Rally Team	WRC-2	(United Kingdom) Elfyn Evans	(United Kingdom) Craig Parry	Ford Fiesta R5	MI
45	(Finland) Printsport	WRC-2	(Norway) Ole Christian Veiby	(Norway) Stig Rune Skjærmoen	Škoda Fabia R5	MI
46	(United Kingdom) Drive DMACK Trophy Team	WRC-2	(Norway) Marius Aasen	(Norway) Veronica Engan	Ford Fiesta R5	DM
47	(Sweden) Emil Bergkvist	WRC-2	(Sweden) Emil Bergkvist	(Sweden) Joakim Sjöberg	Citroën DS3 R5	MI
49	(Paraguay) Augusto Bestard	WRC-2	(Paraguay) Augusto Bestard	(Paraguay) Fernando Mendonca	Ford Fiesta R5	HK
50	(Netherlands) Jim van den Heuvel	WRC-2	(Netherlands) Jim van den Heuvel	(Netherlands) Lisette Bakker	Mitsubishi Lancer Evo X	MI
51	(Norway) Anders Grøndal	WRC-2	(Norway) Anders Grøndal	(Sweden) Miriam Walfridsson	Ford Fiesta R5	P
61	(France) Saintéloc Junior Team	WRC-3	(France) Michel Fabre	(France) Maxime Vilmot	Citroën DS3 R3T	MI
81	(Ukraine) Eurolamp World Rally Team	WRC	(Ukraine) Valeriy Gorban	(Ukraine) Volodymyr Korsia	Mini John Cooper Works WRC	P
95	(Ukraine) Eurolamp World Rally Team	WRC	(Estonia) Mait Maarend	(Estonia) Mihkel Kapp	Mini John Cooper Works WRC	P

Icon	Class
WRC	WRC entries eligible to score manufacturer points
WRC	Major entry ineligible to score manufacturer points
WRC-2	Registered to take part in WRC-2 championship
WRC-3	Registered to take part in WRC-3 championship

== Results ==
=== Event standings ===
Pos.	No.	Driver	Co-driver	Team	Car	Class	Time	Difference	Points
Overall classification
1	1	(France) Sébastien Ogier	(France) Julien Ingrassia	(Germany) Volkswagen Motorsport	Volkswagen Polo R WRC	WRC	1:59:47.4	0.0	28
2	4	(New Zealand) Hayden Paddon	(New Zealand) John Kennard	(Germany) Hyundai Motorsport	Hyundai i20 WRC	WRC	2:00:17.2	+29.8	18
3	5	(Norway) Mads Østberg	(Norway) Ola Fløene	(United Kingdom) M-Sport World Rally Team	Ford Fiesta RS WRC	WRC	2:00:43.0	+55.6	15
4	9	(Norway) Andreas Mikkelsen	(Norway) Anders Jæger	(Germany) Volkswagen Motorsport II	Volkswagen Polo R WRC	WRC	2:00:58.2	+1:10.8	14
5	12	(Estonia) Ott Tänak	(Estonia) Raigo Mõlder	(United Kingdom) DMACK World Rally Team	Ford Fiesta RS WRC	WRC	2:01:38.1	+1:50.7	10
6	20	(Spain) Dani Sordo	(Spain) Marc Martí	(Germany) Hyundai Motorsport N	Hyundai i20 WRC	WRC	2:02:11.4	+2:24.0	8
7	16	(Norway) Henning Solberg	(Austria) Ilka Minor	(Norway) Adapta Motorsport	Ford Fiesta RS WRC	WRC	2:02:27.4	+2:40.0	6
8	15	(Republic of Ireland) Craig Breen	(United Kingdom) Scott Martin	(France) Abu Dhabi Total World Rally Team	Citroën DS3 WRC	WRC	2:02:32.0	+2:44.6	4
9	44	(United Kingdom) Elfyn Evans	(United Kingdom) Craig Parry	(United Kingdom) M-Sport World Rally Team	Ford Fiesta R5	WRC-2	2:05:04.4	+5:17.0	2
10	83	(Finland) Teemu Suninen	(Finland) Mikko Markkula	(France) Team Oreca	Škoda Fabia R5		2:05:19.0	+5:31.6	1
23	7	(United Kingdom) Kris Meeke	(Republic of Ireland) Paul Nagle	(France) Abu Dhabi Total World Rally Team	Citroën DS3 WRC	WRC	2:13:44.2	+13:56.8	1
WRC-2 standings
1 (9.)	44	(United Kingdom) Elfyn Evans	(United Kingdom) Craig Parry	(United Kingdom) M-Sport World Rally Team	Ford Fiesta R5	WRC-2	2:05:04.4	0.0	25
2 (11.)	32	(Sweden) Pontus Tidemand	(Sweden) Jonas Andersson	(Czech Republic) Škoda Motorsport	Škoda Fabia R5	WRC-2	2:05:19.1	+14.7	18
3 (12.)	31	(Finland) Esapekka Lappi	(Finland) Janne Ferm	(Czech Republic) Škoda Motorsport	Škoda Fabia R5	WRC-2	2:06:55.3	+1:50.9	15
4 (13.)	51	(Norway) Anders Grøndal	(Sweden) Miriam Walfridsson	(Norway) Anders Grøndal	Ford Fiesta R5	WRC-2	2:06:57.4	+1:53.0	12
5 (15.)	34	(Norway) Eyvind Brynildsen	(Sweden) Anders Fredriksson	(United Kingdom) M-Sport World Rally Team	Ford Fiesta R5	WRC-2	2:07:34.9	+2:30.5	10
6 (16.)	45	(Norway) Ole Christian Veiby	(Norway) Stig Rune Skjærmoen	(Finland) Printsport	Škoda Fabia R5	WRC-2	2:07:45.0	+2:40.6	8
7 (17.)	47	(Sweden) Emil Bergkvist	(Sweden) Joakim Sjöberg	(Sweden) Emil Bergkvist	Citroën DS3 R5	WRC-2	2:07:45.9	+2:41.5	6
8 (18.)	46	(Norway) Marius Aasen	(Norway) Veronica Engan	(United Kingdom) Drive DMACK Trophy Team	Ford Fiesta R5	WRC-2	2:08:07.8	+3:03.4	4
9 (20.)	38	(Italy) Simone Tempestini	(Italy) Matteo Chiarcossi	(Romania) Napoca Rally Academy	Ford Fiesta R5	WRC-2	2:09:58.9	+4:54.5	2
10 (25.)	43	(Russia) Radik Shaymiev	(Russia) Maxim Tzvetkov	(Russia) TAIF Motorsport	Ford Fiesta R5	WRC-2	2:15:56.7	+10:52.3	1
WRC-3 standings
1 (35.)	61	(France) Michel Fabre	(France) Maxime Vilmot	(France) Saintéloc Junior Team	Citroën DS3 R3T	WRC-3	2:41:39.5	0.0	25

=== Special stages ===
Day	Stage	Name	Length	Winner	Car	Time	Avg. spd.	Rally leader
Leg 1 (11 & 12 Feb)	SS1	(Sweden) Karlstad Super-Special 1	1.90 km	Stage Cancelled				
Leg 1 (11 & 12 Feb)	SS2	(Sweden) Torsby 1	16.48 km	(France) Sébastien Ogier	Volkswagen Polo R WRC	8:53.0	111,3 km/h	(France) Sébastien Ogier
Leg 1 (11 & 12 Feb)	SS3	(Sweden) / (Norway) Röjden 1	18.47 km	(France) Sébastien Ogier	Volkswagen Polo R WRC	9:32.3	116,2 km/h	(France) Sébastien Ogier
Leg 1 (11 & 12 Feb)	SS4	(Norway) Svullrya 1	24.23 km	(France) Sébastien Ogier	Volkswagen Polo R WRC	12:47.9	113,6 km/h	(France) Sébastien Ogier
Leg 1 (11 & 12 Feb)	SS5	(Norway) Kirkenær 1	7.07 km	Stage Cancelled				(France) Sébastien Ogier
Leg 1 (11 & 12 Feb)	SS6	(Norway) Kirkenær 2	7.07 km	Stage Cancelled				(France) Sébastien Ogier
Leg 1 (11 & 12 Feb)	SS7	(Norway) Svullrya 2	24.23 km	(United Kingdom) Kris Meeke	Citroën DS3 WRC	12:44.2	114,1 km/h	(France) Sébastien Ogier
Leg 1 (11 & 12 Feb)	SS8	(Sweden) / (Norway) Röjden 2	18.47 km	(New Zealand) Hayden Paddon	Hyundai i20 WRC	9:52.8	112,2 km/h	(France) Sébastien Ogier
Leg 1 (11 & 12 Feb)	SS9	(Sweden) Torsby 2	16.48 km	(New Zealand) Hayden Paddon	Hyundai i20 WRC	8:56.6	110,6 km/h	(France) Sébastien Ogier
Leg 2 (13 Feb)	SS10	(Sweden) Fredriksberg 1	18.19 km	(France) Sébastien Ogier	Volkswagen Polo R WRC	9:43.4	112,2 km/h	(France) Sébastien Ogier
Leg 2 (13 Feb)	SS11	(Sweden) Rämmen 1	22.76 km	Stage Cancelled				(France) Sébastien Ogier
Leg 2 (13 Feb)	SS12	(Sweden) Vargåsen 1	24.70 km	(Finland) Jari-Matti Latvala	Volkswagen Polo R WRC	12:56.7	114,5 km/h	(France) Sébastien Ogier
Leg 2 (13 Feb)	SS13	(Sweden) Fredriksberg 2	18.9 km	Stage Cancelled				(France) Sébastien Ogier
Leg 2 (13 Feb)	SS14	(Sweden) Rämmen 2	22.76 km	(Finland) Jari-Matti Latvala	Volkswagen Polo R WRC	11:03.2	123,5 km/h	(France) Sébastien Ogier
Leg 2 (13 Feb)	SS15	(Sweden) Hagfors Sprint	1.87 km	Stage Cancelled				(France) Sébastien Ogier
Leg 2 (13 Feb)	SS16	(Sweden) Vargåsen 2	24.70 km	(France) Sébastien Ogier	Volkswagen Polo R WRC	12:48.8	115,7 km/h	(France) Sébastien Ogier
Leg 2 (13 Feb)	SS17	(Sweden) Karlstad Super-Special 2	1.90 km	(Finland) Jari-Matti Latvala	Volkswagen Polo R WRC	1:34.9	72,1 km/h	(France) Sébastien Ogier
Leg 3 (14 Feb)	SS18	(Sweden) Lesjöfors 1	15.00 km	Stage Cancelled				(France) Sébastien Ogier
Leg 3 (14 Feb)	SS19	(Sweden) Värmullsåsen 1	15.87 km	Stage Cancelled				(France) Sébastien Ogier
Leg 3 (14 Feb)	SS20	(Sweden) Lesjöfors 2	15.00 km	Stage Cancelled				(France) Sébastien Ogier
Leg 3 (14 Feb)	SS21	(Sweden) Värmullsåsen 2 (Power stage)	15.87 km	(France) Sébastien Ogier	Volkswagen Polo R WRC	7:42.7	123,5 km/h	(France) Sébastien Ogier

=== Power Stage ===
The "Power stage" was a 15.87 km (9.86 mi) stage at the end of the rally.

Pos	Driver	Car	Time	Diff.	Pts
1	(France) Sébastien Ogier	Volkswagen Polo R WRC	7:42.7	0.0	3
2	(Norway) Andreas Mikkelsen	Volkswagen Polo R WRC	7:46.1	+3.4	2
3	(United Kingdom) Kris Meeke	Citroën DS3 WRC	7:51.7	+9.0	1

== Championship standings after the event ==
=== WRC ===
Drivers' Championship standings

Pos.	Driver	Points
1	(France) Sébastien Ogier	56
2	(Norway) Andreas Mikkelsen	33
3	(Norway) Mads Østberg	27
4	(New Zealand) Hayden Paddon	18
5	(Spain) Dani Sordo	18

Manufacturers' Championship standings

Pos.	Constructor	Points
1	(Germany) Volkswagen Motorsport	54
2	(Germany) Hyundai Motorsport	49
3	(Germany) Volkswagen Motorsport II	30
4	(United Kingdom) M-Sport World Rally Team	27
5	(United Kingdom) DMACK World Rally Team	18

=== Other ===
WRC2 Drivers' Championship standings

Pos.	Driver	Points
1	(United Kingdom) Elfyn Evans	50
2	(Germany) Armin Kremer	18
3	(Sweden) Pontus Tidemand	18
4	(France) Quentin Gilbert	15
5	(Finland) Esapekka Lappi	15

WRC3 Drivers' Championship standings

Pos.	Driver	Points
1	(France) Michel Fabre	29
2	(Norway) Ole Christian Veiby	25
3	(France) Jordan Berfa	18
4	(Italy) Fabio Andolfi	15
5	(Italy) Damiano De Tommaso	12
