= 2017 Monte Carlo Rally =

2017 race in Monaco

2017 Monte Carlo Rally 85ème Rallye Automobile Monte-Carlo
Round 1 of the 2017 World Rally Championship
Next event →
- Host country: Monaco
- Rally base: (France) Gap, Hautes-Alpes
- Dates run: 19 – 22 January 2017
- Stages: 17 (382.65 km; 237.77 miles)
- Stage surface: Tarmac and snow

Statistics
- Crews: 73 at start, 54 at finish

Overall results
- Overall winner: (France) Sébastien Ogier (France) Julien Ingrassia (United Kingdom) M-Sport World Rally Team

The 2017 Monte Carlo Rally (formally known as the 85ème Rallye Automobile Monte-Carlo) is a motor racing event for rally cars that was held over four days between 19 and 22 January 2017. It marks the eighty-fifth running of the Monte Carlo Rally, and is the first round of the 2017 World Rally Championship, WRC-2 and WRC-3 seasons.

The rally was the first round in which 2017-specification World Rally Cars compete, and will see the return of Toyota and Citroën to the championship, with the Toyota Yaris WRC and Citroën C3 WRC respectively.

== Report ==
Hayden Paddon withdrew from the rally after a fatal accident involving a spectator on the opening stage. Paddon lost control after hitting a patch of black ice, which spun him into an embankment and rolled the car. The spectator was hit after Paddon initially lost control. The stage was stopped while medical attention was sought and the car retrieved, but the spectator could not be revived. Although Paddon was eligible to re-enter the rally under Rally-2 regulations, the team chose to withdraw his car from the event.

== Entry list ==
Notable entrants
No.	Entrant	Class	Driver	Co-driver	Car	Tyre
1	(United Kingdom) M-Sport World Rally Team	WRC	(France) Sébastien Ogier	(France) Julien Ingrassia	Ford Fiesta WRC	MI
2	(United Kingdom) M-Sport World Rally Team	WRC	(Estonia) Ott Tänak	(Estonia) Martin Järveoja	Ford Fiesta WRC	MI
3	(United Kingdom) M-Sport World Rally Team	WRC	(United Kingdom) Elfyn Evans	(United Kingdom) Daniel Barritt	Ford Fiesta WRC	DM
4	(South Korea) Hyundai Motorsport	WRC	(New Zealand) Hayden Paddon	(New Zealand) John Kennard	Hyundai i20 Coupe WRC	MI
5	(South Korea) Hyundai Motorsport	WRC	(Belgium) Thierry Neuville	(Belgium) Nicolas Gilsoul	Hyundai i20 Coupe WRC	MI
6	(South Korea) Hyundai Motorsport	WRC	(Spain) Dani Sordo	(Spain) Marc Martí	Hyundai i20 Coupe WRC	MI
7	(France) Citroën Total Abu Dhabi WRT	WRC	(United Kingdom) Kris Meeke	(Republic of Ireland) Paul Nagle	Citroën C3 WRC	MI
8	(France) Citroën Total Abu Dhabi WRT	WRC	(France) Stéphane Lefebvre	(France) Gabin Moreau	Citroën C3 WRC	MI
10	(Japan) Toyota Gazoo Racing WRT	WRC	(Finland) Jari-Matti Latvala	(Finland) Miikka Anttila	Toyota Yaris WRC	MI
11	(Japan) Toyota Gazoo Racing WRT	WRC	(Finland) Juho Hänninen	(Finland) Kaj Lindström	Toyota Yaris WRC	MI
14	(France) Citroën Total Abu Dhabi WRT	WRC	(Republic of Ireland) Craig Breen	(United Kingdom) Scott Martin	Citroën DS3 WRC	MI
20	(Belgium) J-Motorsport	WRC	(Greece) Jourdan Serderidis	(Belgium) Frédéric Miclotte	Citroën DS3 WRC	MI
31	(Czech Republic) Škoda Motorsport	WRC-2	(Norway) Andreas Mikkelsen	(Norway) Anders Jæger	Škoda Fabia R5	MI
32	(Czech Republic) Škoda Motorsport	WRC-2	(Czech Republic) Jan Kopecký	(Czech Republic) Pavel Dresler	Škoda Fabia R5	MI
33	(Italy) Motorsport Italia SRL	WRC-2	(Italy) Max Rendina	(Italy) Emanuele Inglesi	Škoda Fabia R5	P
34	(Austria) BRR Baumschlager Rally & Rally Team	WRC-2	(Germany) Armin Kremer	(Germany) Pirmin Winklhofer	Škoda Fabia R5	DM
35	(Italy) D-Max Racing	WRC-2	(France) Quentin Gilbert	(Belgium) Renaud Jamoul	Ford Fiesta R5	MI
36	(France) CHL Sport Auto	WRC-2	(France) Yoann Bonato	(France) Benjamin Boulloud	Citroën DS3 R5	MI
38	(Belgium) J-Motorsport	WRC-2	(Sweden) Emil Bergkvist	(Sweden) Joakim Sjöberg	Citroën DS3 R5	MI
39	(United Kingdom) M-Sport World Rally Team	WRC-2	(France) Eric Camilli	(France) Benjamin Veillas	Ford Fiesta R5	MI
40	(Czech Republic) Gemini Clinic Rally Team	WRC-2	(France) Bryan Bouffier	(France) Denis Giraudet	Ford Fiesta R5	MI
41	(Italy) BRC	WRC-2	(Italy) Giandomenico Basso	(Italy) Simone Scattolin	Ford Fiesta R5	MI
42	(Italy) D-Max Racing	WRC-2	(Italy) Andrea Crugnola	(Italy) Michele Ferrara	Ford Fiesta R5	DM
43	(France) Sébastien Loeb Racing	WRC-2	(France) Quentin Giordano	(France) Thomas Roux	Peugeot 208 T16	MI
61	(France) Renault Sport Racing Team	WRC-3	(Switzerland) Cédric Althaus	(Switzerland) Jessica Bayard	Renault Clio RS R3T	MI
63	(France) Renault Sport Racing Team	WRC-3	(France) Charles Martin	(France) Mathieu Duval	Renault Clio RS R3T	MI
65	(France) Renault Sport Racing Team	WRC-3	(Spain) Surhayen Pernia	(Spain) Penate Rogelio	Renault Clio RS R3T	MI
67	(France) Renault Sport Racing Team	WRC-3	(Italy) Luca Panzani	(Italy) Federico Grilli	Renault Clio RS R3T	MI
69	(Italy) Vieffecorse	WRC-3	(Italy) Enrico Brazzoli	(Italy) Maurizio Barone	Peugeot 208 R2	DM
71	(France) CHL Sport Auto	WRC-3	(France) Raphael Astier	(France) Frédéric Vauclare	Peugeot 208 R2	MI

Key
Icon	Class
WRC	WRC entries eligible to score manufacturer points
WRC	Major entry ineligible to score manufacturer points
WRC	Registered to score points in WRC Trophy
WRC-2	Registered to take part in WRC-2 championship
WRC-3	Registered to take part in WRC-3 championship

== Classification ==
=== Event standings ===
Pos.	No.	Driver	Co-driver	Team	Car	Class	Time	Difference	Points
Overall classification
1	1	(France) Sébastien Ogier	(France) Julien Ingrassia	(United Kingdom) M-Sport World Rally Team	Ford Fiesta WRC	WRC	4:00:03.6		25
2	10	(Finland) Jari-Matti Latvala	(Finland) Miikka Anttila	(Japan) Toyota Gazoo Racing WRT	Toyota Yaris WRC	WRC	4:02:18.6	+2:15.0	18
3	2	(Estonia) Ott Tänak	(Estonia) Martin Järveoja	(United Kingdom) M-Sport World Rally Team	Ford Fiesta WRC	WRC	4:03:01.4	+2:57.8	15
4	6	(Spain) Dani Sordo	(Spain) Marc Martí	(South Korea) Hyundai Motorsport	Hyundai i20 Coupe WRC	WRC	4:03:39.4	+3:35.8	13
5	14	(Republic of Ireland) Craig Breen	(United Kingdom) Scott Martin	(France) Citroën Total Abu Dhabi WRT	Citroën DS3 WRC	WRC	4:03:51.4	+3:47.8	10
6	3	(United Kingdom) Elfyn Evans	(United Kingdom) Daniel Barritt	(United Kingdom) M-Sport World Rally Team	Ford Fiesta WRC	WRC	4:06:48.6	+6:45.0	10
7	31	(Norway) Andreas Mikkelsen	(Norway) Anders Jæger	(Czech Republic) Škoda Motorsport	Škoda Fabia R5	WRC-2	4:09:36.3	+9:32.7	6
8	32	(Czech Republic) Jan Kopecký	(Czech Republic) Pavel Dresler	(Czech Republic) Škoda Motorsport	Škoda Fabia R5	WRC-2	4:13:01.7	+12:32.7	4
9	8	(France) Stéphane Lefebvre	(France) Gabin Moreau	(France) Citroën Total Abu Dhabi WRT	Citroën C3 WRC	WRC	4:14:47.4	+14:43.8	6
10	40	(France) Bryan Bouffier	(France) Denis Giraudet	(Czech Republic) Gemini Clinic Rally Team	Ford Fiesta R5	WRC-2	4:16:13.0	+16:09.4	1
15	5	(Belgium) Thierry Neuville	(Belgium) Nicolas Gilsoul	(South Korea) Hyundai Motorsport	Hyundai i20 Coupe WRC	WRC	4:30:56.1	+30:52.5	5
16	11	(Finland) Juho Hänninen	(Finland) Kaj Lindström	(Japan) Toyota Gazoo Racing WRT	Toyota Yaris WRC	WRC	4:32:20.4	+32:16.8	3
WRC-2 standings
1 (7.)	31	(Norway) Andreas Mikkelsen	(Norway) Anders Jæger	(Czech Republic) Škoda Motorsport	Škoda Fabia R5	WRC-2	4:09:36.3		25
2 (8.)	32	(Czech Republic) Jan Kopecký	(Czech Republic) Pavel Dresler	(Czech Republic) Škoda Motorsport	Škoda Fabia R5	WRC-2	4:13:01.7	+3:25.4	18
3 (10.)	40	(France) Bryan Bouffier	(France) Denis Giraudet	(Czech Republic) Gemini Clinic Rally Team	Ford Fiesta R5	WRC-2	4:16:13.0	+6:36.7	15
4 (12.)	39	(France) Eric Camilli	(France) Benjamin Veillas	(United Kingdom) M-Sport World Rally Team	Ford Fiesta R5	WRC-2	4:19:32.1	+9:55.8	12
5 (13.)	35	(France) Quentin Gilbert	(Belgium) Renaud Jamoul	(Italy) D-Max Racing	Ford Fiesta R5	WRC-2	4:21:13.1	+11:36.8	10
6 (17.)	38	(Sweden) Emil Bergkvist	(Sweden) Joakim Sjöberg	(Belgium) J-Motorsport	Citroën DS3 R5	WRC-2	4:36:48.1	+27:11.8	8
7 (18.)	42	(Italy) Andrea Crugnola	(Italy) Michele Ferrara	(Italy) D-Max Racing	Ford Fiesta R5	WRC-2	4:39:47.1	+30:10.8	6
WRC-3 standings
1 (19.)	71	(France) Raphael Astier	(France) Frédéric Vauclare	(France) CHL Sport Auto	Peugeot 208 R2	WRC-3	4:39:55.8		25
2 (21.)	67	(Italy) Luca Panzani	(Italy) Federico Grilli	(France) Renault Sport Racing Team	Renault Clio RS R3T	WRC-3	4:49:18.3	+9:22.5	18
3 (23.)	63	(France) Charles Martin	(France) Mathieu Duval	(France) Renault Sport Racing Team	Renault Clio RS R3T	WRC-3	4:49:55.8	+10:00.0	15
4 (25.)	65	(Spain) Surhayen Pernia	(Spain) Penate Rogelio	(France) Renault Sport Racing Team	Renault Clio RS R3T	WRC-3	4:51:45.4	+11:49.6	12

=== Special stages ===
Day	Stage	Name	Length	Winner	Car	Time	Rally Leader
Leg 1 (19 Jan)	SS1	Entrevaux - Val de Chalvagne - Ubraye	21.25 km	Stage cancelled			
Leg 1 (19 Jan)	SS2	Bayons - Breziers 1	25.49 km	(Belgium) Thierry Neuville	Hyundai i20 Coupe WRC	15:01.1	(Belgium) Thierry Neuville
Leg 2 (20 Jan)	SS3	Agnieres en Devoluy - Le Motty 1	24.63 km	(Estonia) Ott Tänak	Ford Fiesta WRC	19:17.8	(Belgium) Thierry Neuville
Leg 2 (20 Jan)	SS4	Aspres les Corps - Chaillol 1	38.94 km	(Belgium) Thierry Neuville	Hyundai i20 Coupe WRC	25:41.9	(Belgium) Thierry Neuville
Leg 2 (20 Jan)	SS5	St-Leger-les-Mélèzes – La-Bâtie-Neuve 1	17.82 km	(Belgium) Thierry Neuville	Hyundai i20 Coupe WRC	11:22.2	(Belgium) Thierry Neuville
Leg 2 (20 Jan)	SS6	Agnières-en-Dévoluy - Le Motty 2	24.63 km	(Belgium) Thierry Neuville	Hyundai i20 Coupe WRC	18:09.6	(Belgium) Thierry Neuville
Leg 2 (20 Jan)	SS7	Aspres-lès-Corps - Chaillol 2	38.94 km	(France) Sébastien Ogier	Ford Fiesta WRC	24:17.8	(Belgium) Thierry Neuville
Leg 2 (20 Jan)	SS8	Saint-Léger-les-Mélèzes - La Bâtie-Neuve 2	17.82 km	(France) Sébastien Ogier	Ford Fiesta WRC	11:05.4	(Belgium) Thierry Neuville
Leg 3 (21 Jan)	SS9	Lardier et Valenca - Oze 1	31.17 km	(Belgium) Thierry Neuville	Hyundai i20 Coupe WRC	24:02.9	(Belgium) Thierry Neuville
Leg 3 (21 Jan)	SS10	La Batie Monsaleon - Faye 1	16.78 km	(United Kingdom) Elfyn Evans	Ford Fiesta WRC	9:15.2	(Belgium) Thierry Neuville
Leg 3 (21 Jan)	SS11	Lardier et Valenca - Oze 2	31.17 km	(France) Sébastien Ogier	Ford Fiesta WRC	22:53.0	(Belgium) Thierry Neuville
Leg 3 (21 Jan)	SS12	La Batie Monsaleon - Faye 2	16.78 km	(United Kingdom) Elfyn Evans	Ford Fiesta WRC	8:56.7	(Belgium) Thierry Neuville
Leg 3 (21 Jan)	SS13	Bayons - Breziers 2	25.49 km	(United Kingdom) Elfyn Evans	Ford Fiesta WRC	14:27.5	(France) Sébastien Ogier
Leg 4 (22 Jan)	SS14	Luceram - Col St Roch 1	5.50 km	(Spain) Dani Sordo	Hyundai i20 Coupe WRC	3:35.7	(France) Sébastien Ogier
Leg 4 (22 Jan)	SS15	La Bollene Vesubie - Peira Cava 1	21.36 km	(France) Stéphane Lefebvre	Citroën C3 WRC	13:51.1	(France) Sébastien Ogier
Leg 4 (22 Jan)	SS16	Luceram - Col St Roch 2	5.50 km	Stage cancelled			
Leg 4 (22 Jan)	SS17	La Bollene Vesubie - Peira Cava 2 [Power Stage]	21.36 km	(Belgium) Thierry Neuville	Hyundai i20 Coupe WRC	14:14.4	(France) Sébastien Ogier

=== Power Stage ===
The Power Stage was a 21.36 km (13.48 mi) stage at the end of the rally.

Pos.	Driver	Co-driver	Car	Time	Diff.	Pts.
1	(Belgium) Thierry Neuville	(Belgium) Nicolas Gilsoul	Hyundai i20 Coupe WRC	14:14.4	0.0	5
2	(France) Stéphane Lefebvre	(France) Gabin Moreau	Citroën C3 WRC	14:44.5	+30.1	4
3	(Finland) Juho Hänninen	(Finland) Kaj Lindström	Toyota Yaris WRC	15:09.4	+55.0	3
4	(United Kingdom) Elfyn Evans	(United Kingdom) Daniel Barritt	Ford Fiesta WRC	15:28.1	+1:13.7	2
5	(Spain) Dani Sordo	(Spain) Marc Martí	Hyundai i20 Coupe WRC	15:57.2	+1:42.8	1

=== Championship standings after the rally ===
Drivers' Championship standings

Pos.	Driver	Points
1	(France) Sébastien Ogier	25
2	(Finland) Jari-Matti Latvala	18
3	(Estonia) Ott Tänak	15
4	(Spain) Dani Sordo	13
5	(Republic of Ireland) Craig Breen	10

Manufacturers' Championship standings

Pos.	Manufacturer	Points
1	(United Kingdom) M-Sport World Rally Team	40
2	(Japan) Toyota Gazoo Racing WRT	24
3	(South Korea) Hyundai Motorsport	20
4	(France) Citroën Total Abu Dhabi WRT	10
