= 2016 WRC3 Championship =

The 2016 FIA WRC3 Championship was the fourth season of WRC3, a rallying championship organised and governed by the Fédération Internationale de l'Automobile, ran in support of the World Rally Championship. It was created when the Group R class of rally car was introduced in 2013. The Championship was composed of fourteen rallies, and drivers and teams had to nominate a maximum of six events. The best five results counted towards the championship.

Quentin Gilbert was the defending champion, as he won the 2015 title.

== Calendar ==
The calendar was announced in November 2015 by the FIA. The season was scheduled to expand with one rally in comparison to the 2015 championship, contested over fourteen rounds in Europe, the Americas, Oceania and Asia, but the Chinese round was ultimately cancelled.

| Round | Dates | Rally name | Rally headquarters | Surface | Stages | Distance |
|---|---|---|---|---|---|---|
| 1 | 21–24 January | (Monaco) Monte Carlo Rally | Gap, Hautes-Alpes, France | Mixed | 16 | 337.59km |
| 2 | 12–14 February | Rally Sweden | Karlstad, Värmland | Snow | 12^{1a} | 226.48km^{1b} |
| 3 | 3–6 March | Rally Mexico | León, Guanajuato | Gravel | 21 | 399.67km |
| 4 | 21–24 April | Rally Argentina | Villa Carlos Paz, Córdoba | Gravel | 18 | 364.68km |
| 5 | 19–22 May | Rally de Portugal | Matosinhos, Porto | Gravel | 19 | 368.00km |
| 6 | 9–12 June | (Italy) Rally Italia Sardegna | Alghero, Sardinia | Gravel | 19 | 324.60km |
| 7 | 30 June–3 July | Rally Poland | Mikołajki, Warmia-Masuria | Gravel | 21 | 306.10km |
| 8 | 28–31 July | Rally Finland | Jyväskylä, Keski-Suomi | Gravel | 24 | 333.99km |
| 9 | 19–21 August | (Germany) Rallye Deutschland | Trier, Rhineland-Palatinate | Tarmac | 18 | 306.80km |
| 10 | 9–11 September | Rally China | Beijing, Hebei | Tarmac | Cancelled^{2} | |
| 11 | 30 September–2 October | (France) Tour de Corse | Bastia, Haute-Corse | Tarmac | 10 | 390.92km |
| 12 | 13–16 October | (Spain) Rally Catalunya | Salou, Tarragona | Mixed | 21 | 321.08km |
| 13 | 28–30 October | (United Kingdom) Wales Rally GB | Deeside, Flintshire | Gravel | 22 | 336.00km |
| 14 | 18–20 November | Rally Australia | Coffs Harbour, New South Wales | Gravel | 23 | 283.36km^{3} |

Notes

- ^1 – Rally Sweden was shortened due to warm weather conditions turning frozen roads into soft, muddy gravel and making the studded tyres unsafe to use.
- ^2 – Rally China was cancelled due to weather damage caused by torrential storms and flooding in July.
- ^3 – The route of Rally Australia was shortened following concerns over dust reducing visibility in forest stages.

=== Calendar changes ===
- Rally Australia was moved from its September date to November to become the final round of the championship.
- The calendar was to be expanded to fourteen rounds in 2016, with the inclusion of the Rally of China, seventeen years after its only appearance as a round of the WRC.
- The Tour de Corse relocated its headquarters from Corte to Bastia, which features a brand-new route.

== Teams and drivers ==
| Entrant | Car | Class | Tyre | Drivers | Co-Drivers | Rounds |
|---|---|---|---|---|---|---|
| (Finland) Printsport | Citroën DS3 R3T | R3 | MI | (Norway) Ole Christian Veiby | (Sweden) Jonas Andersson | 1 |
| (Finland) Printsport | Citroën DS3 R3T | R3 | MI | (Norway) Ole Christian Veiby | (Norway) Stig Rune Skjærmoen | 5, 7–10 |
| (Finland) Printsport | Citroën DS3 R3T | R3 | MI | (Finland) Juuso Nordgren | (Finland) Mikael Korhonen | 8 |
| (Italy) ACI Team Italia | Peugeot 208 R2 | R2 | P | (Italy) Fabio Andolfi | (Italy) Manuel Fenoli | 1, 5–6, 8–9, 11 |
| (Italy) ACI Team Italia | Peugeot 208 R2 | R2 | P | (Italy) Damiano De Tommaso | (Italy) Massimiliano Bosi | 1 |
| (Italy) ACI Team Italia | Peugeot 208 R2 | R2 | P | (Italy) Damiano De Tommaso | (Italy) Paolo Rocca | 5–6, 8–9, 11 |
| (France) Peugeot Rally Academy | Peugeot 208 R2 | R2 | MI | (France) Jordan Berfa | (France) Damien Augustin | 1, 9–10 |
| (Slovakia) Styllex Slovak National Team | Citroën DS3 R3T | R3 | MI | (Slovakia) Martin Koči | (Czech Republic) Lukáš Kostka | 1, 5, 7–10, 12 |
| (France) Saintéloc Junior Team | Citroën DS3 R3T | R3 | MI | (France) Michel Fabre | (France) Maxime Vilmot | 1–4, 11–13 |
| (France) Saintéloc Junior Team | Citroën DS3 R3T | R3 | MI | (France) Yohan Rossel | (France) Benoît Fulcrand | 12 |
| Équipe de France FFSA | Citroën DS3 R3T | R3 | MI | (France) Yohan Rossel | (France) Benoît Fulcrand | 10 |
| Équipe de France FFSA | Citroën DS3 R3T | R3 | MI | (France) Laurent Pellier | (France) Benoit Neyret-Gigot | 10 |
| (France) LTB Motor | Peugeot 208 R2 | R2 | MI | (France) Igor Giusti | (France) Patrick Chiappe | 1 |
| (France) LTB Motor | Peugeot 208 R2 | R2 | MI | (France) Igor Giusti | (France) Gilbert Dini | 5–6, 10 |
| (France) AFC Racing | Citroën DS3 R3T | R3 | MI | (France) Vincent Dubert | (France) Sébastien Pujol | 1 |
| (France) AFC Racing | Citroën DS3 R3T | R3 | MI | (France) Vincent Dubert | (France) Alexandre Coria | 5, 7–10, 12 |
| (Italy) Vieffecorse | Peugeot 208 R2 | R2 | DM | (Italy) Enrico Brazzoli | (Italy) Maurizio Barone | 1, 5–6, 10–11 |
| (France) Renault Sport Rally Team | Renault Clio RS R3T | R3 | MI | (Switzerland) Michaël Burri | (France) Anderson Levratti | 5, 7–12 |
| (Portugal) Fernando Costa Motorsport | Renault Clio RS R3T | R3 | DM | (Portugal) Carlos Oliveira | (Portugal) José Janela | 5 |
| (France) Abu Dhabi Racing Team | Citroën DS3 R3T | R3 | MI | (United Arab Emirates) Mohamed Al-Mutawaa | (United Kingdom) Stephen McAuley | 5, 7–9 |
| (France) Abu Dhabi Racing Team | Citroën DS3 R3T | R3 | MI | (United Arab Emirates) Mohamed Al-Mutawaa | (United Kingdom) Stuart Loudon | 10, 12 |
| (France) Trajectoire Racing | Citroën DS3 R3T | R3 | MI | (France) Romain Martel | (France) Vanessa Lemoine | 5, 7–10 |
| (France) Trajectoire Racing | Citroën DS3 R3T | R3 | MI | (France) Frédéric Hauswald | (France) Maxime Vilmot | 5 |
| (Netherlands) Hans Weijs Motorsport | Citroën DS3 R3T | R3 | MI | (Namibia) Hans Thilo Himmel | (South Africa) Nicolaas Swartz | 5, 7 |
| (France) Citroën Racing | Citroën DS3 R3T | R3 | MI | (Poland) Łukasz Pieniąźek | (Poland) Przemek Mazur | 5, 7–8 |
| (Italy) Delta Rally | Citroën DS3 R3T | R3 | MI | (Italy) Andrea Crugnola | (Italy) Michele Ferrara | 5, 7–8 |
| (Romania) Napoca Rally Academy | Citroën DS3 R3T | R3 | MI | (Italy) Simone Tempestini | (Italy) Giovanni Bernacchini | 5, 7–10, 12 |
| (France) Sébastien Loeb Racing | Citroën DS3 R3T | R3 | MI | (France) Terry Folb | (France) Franck Le Floch | 5, 7–10, 12 |
| (Poland) Rally Technology | Peugeot 208 R2 | R2 | MI | (Poland) Tomasz Gryc | (Poland) Michał Kuśnierz | 7 |
| (Netherlands) Hontec Motorsport | Renault Clio RS R3T | R3 | MI | (Netherlands) Kevin van Deijne | (Netherlands) Hein Verschuuren | 9, 11 |
| (France) PH Sport | Citroën DS3 R3T | R3 | MI | (Belgium) William Wagner | (France) Antoine Paque | 10, 12 |

== Results and standings ==
=== Season summary ===
| Round | Event name | Winning driver | Winning co-driver | Winning Entry | Winning time | Report |
|---|---|---|---|---|---|---|
| 1 | (Monaco) Rallye Monte Carlo | (Norway) Ole Christian Veiby | (Sweden) Jonas Andersson | (Finland) Printsport | 4:30:42.9 | Report |
| 2 | Rally Sweden | (France) Michel Fabre | (France) Maxime Vilmot | (France) Saintéloc Junior Team | 2:41:39.5 | Report |
| 3 | Rally Mexico | (France) Michel Fabre | (France) Maxime Vilmot | (France) Saintéloc Junior Team | 5:34:30.7 | Report |
| 4 | Rally Argentina | (France) Michel Fabre | (France) Maxime Vilmot | (France) Saintéloc Junior Team | 4:53:11.0 | Report |
| 5 | Rally de Portugal | (Italy) Simone Tempestini | (Italy) Giovanni Bernacchini | (Romania) Napoca Rally Academy | 4:30:15.7 | Report |
| 6 | (Italy) Rally Italia Sardegna | (Italy) Fabio Andolfi | (Italy) Manuel Fenoli | (Italy) ACI Team Italia | 4:08:32.3 | Report |
| 7 | Rally Poland | (Italy) Simone Tempestini | (Italy) Giovanni Bernacchini | (Romania) Napoca Rally Academy | 3:04:11.3 | Report |
| 8 | Rally Finland | (Norway) Ole Christian Veiby | (Norway) Stig Rune Skjærmoen | (Finland) Printsport | 2:55:40.0 | Report |
| 9 | (Germany) Rallye Deutschland | (Italy) Simone Tempestini | (Italy) Giovanni Bernacchini | (Romania) Napoca Rally Academy | 3:21:12.4 | Report |
| 10 | Rally China | Rally cancelled | | | | |
| 11 | (France) Tour de Corse | (France) Laurent Pellier | (France) Benoit Neyret-Gigot | Équipe de France FFSA | 4:38:19.3 | Report |
| 12 | (Spain) Rally Catalunya | (Italy) Fabio Andolfi | (Italy) Manuel Fenoli | (Italy) ACI Team Italia | 3:38:33.6 | Report |
| 13 | (United Kingdom) Wales Rally GB | (Slovakia) Martin Koči | (Czech Republic) Lukáš Kostka | (Slovakia) Styllex Slovak National Team | 3:47:47.4 | Report |
| 14 | Rally Australia | (France) Michel Fabre | (France) Maxime Vilmot | (France) Saintéloc Junior Team | 2:46:05.7 | Report |

=== FIA WRC3 Championship for Drivers ===
Points are awarded to the top ten classified finishers.

| Position | 1st | 2nd | 3rd | 4th | 5th | 6th | 7th | 8th | 9th | 10th |
| Points | 25 | 18 | 15 | 12 | 10 | 8 | 6 | 4 | 2 | 1 |

| Pos. | Driver | MON (Monaco) | SWE (Sweden) | MEX (Mexico) | ARG (Argentina) | POR (Portugal) | ITA (Italy) | POL (Poland) | FIN (Finland) | GER (Germany) | FRA (France) | ESP (Spain) | GBR (United Kingdom) | AUS (Australia) | Drops | Points |
|---|---|---|---|---|---|---|---|---|---|---|---|---|---|---|---|---|
| 1 | (Italy) Simone Tempestini | | | | | 1 | | 1 | 2 | 1 | 4 | | 2 | | 0 | 123 |
| 2 | (France) Michel Fabre | 8 | 1 | 1 | 1 | | | | | | | 4 | 5 | 1 | 4 | 122 |
| 3 | (Italy) Fabio Andolfi | 3 | | | | 4 | 1 | | 9 | 4 | | 1 | | | 0 | 91 |
| 4 | (Slovakia) Martin Koči | 6 | | | | 2 | | DNS | 8 | 2 | 3 | | 1 | | 0 | 88 |
| 5 | (Norway) Ole Christian Veiby | 1 | | | | 8 | | 3 | 1 | 12 | 8 | | | | 0 | 73 |
| 6 | (Italy) Damiano De Tommaso | 4 | | | | 6 | 2 | | 6 | 6 | | 3 | | | 0 | 69 |
| 7 | (France) Vincent Dubert | 5 | | | | 5 | | 5 | 4 | 8 | 7 | | 6 | | 0 | 60 |
| 8 | (France) Terry Folb | | | | | 3 | | 2 | Ret | 3 | 6 | | | | 0 | 56 |
| 9 | (Switzerland) Michaël Burri | | | | | 7 | | 8 | | 7 | 5 | 2 | 4 | | 0 | 56 |
| 10 | (France) Yohan Rossel | | | | | | | | | | 2 | | 3 | | 0 | 33 |
| 11 | (France) Romain Martel | | | | | 10 | | 4 | 5 | 5 | Ret | | | | 0 | 33 |
| 12 | (Italy) Enrico Brazzoli | 7 | | | | 11 | 4 | | | | 9 | 5 | | | 0 | 30 |
| 13 | (France) Laurent Pellier | | | | | | | | | | 1 | | | | 0 | 25 |
| 14 | (France) Jordan Berfa | 2 | | | | | | | | 11 | Ret | | | | 0 | 18 |
| 15 | (France) Igor Giusti | 9 | | | | 13 | 3 | | | | 10 | | | | 0 | 18 |
| 16 | (Finland) Juuso Nordgren | | | | | | | | 3 | | | | | | 0 | 15 |
| 17 | (United Arab Emirates) Mohamed Al-Mutawaa | | | | | 12 | | 9 | 7 | 9 | Ret | | | | 0 | 10 |
| 18 | (Poland) Tomasz Gryc | | | | | | | 6 | | | | | | | 0 | 8 |
| 19 | (Poland) Łukasz Pieniążek | | | | | 15 | | 7 | | | | | | | 0 | 6 |
| 20 | (France) Frédéric Hauswald | | | | | 9 | | | | | | | | | 0 | 2 |
| 21 | (Netherlands) Kevin van Deijne | | | | | | | | | 10 | | WD | | | 0 | 1 |
| Pos. | Driver | MON (Monaco) | SWE (Sweden) | MEX (Mexico) | ARG (Argentina) | POR (Portugal) | ITA (Italy) | POL (Poland) | FIN (Finland) | GER (Germany) | FRA (France) | ESP (Spain) | GBR (United Kingdom) | AUS (Australia) | Drops | Points |

Key
| Colour | Result |
|---|---|
| Gold | Winner |
| Silver | 2nd place |
| Bronze | 3rd place |
| Green | Points finish |
| Blue | Non-points finish |
| Blue | Non-classified finish (NC) |
| Purple | Did not finish (Ret) |
| Black | Excluded (EX) |
| Black | Disqualified (DSQ) |
| White | Did not start (DNS) |
| White | Cancelled (C) |
| Blank | Withdrew entry from the event (WD) |

=== FIA WRC3 Championship for Co-Drivers ===
| Pos. | Co-driver | MON (Monaco) | SWE (Sweden) | MEX (Mexico) | ARG (Argentina) | POR (Portugal) | ITA (Italy) | POL (Poland) | FIN (Finland) | GER (Germany) | FRA (France) | ESP (Spain) | GBR (United Kingdom) | AUS (Australia) | Drops | Points |
|---|---|---|---|---|---|---|---|---|---|---|---|---|---|---|---|---|
| 1 | (Italy) Giovanni Bernacchini | | | | | 1 | | 1 | 2 | 1 | 4 | | 2 | | 0 | 123 |
| 2 | (France) Maxime Vilmot^{3} | 8 | 1 | 1 | 1 | | | | | | | 4 | 5 | 1 | 4 | 122 |
| 3 | (Italy) Manuel Fenoli | 3 | | | | 4 | 1 | | 9 | 4 | | 1 | | | 0 | 91 |
| 4 | (Czech Republic) Lukáš Kostka | 6 | | | | 2 | | DNS | 8 | 2 | 3 | | 1 | | 0 | 88 |
| 5 | (Italy) Paolo Rocca | | | | | 6 | 2 | | 6 | 6 | | 3 | | | 0 | 57 |
| 6 | (France) Franck Le Floch | | | | | 3 | | 2 | Ret | 3 | 6 | | | | 0 | 56 |
| 7 | (France) Anderson Levratti | | | | | 7 | | 8 | | 7 | 5 | 2 | 4 | | 0 | 56 |
| 8 | (France) Alexandre Coria | | | | | 5 | | 5 | 4 | 8 | 7 | | 6 | | 0 | 50 |
| 9 | (Norway) Stig Rune Skjærmoen | | | | | 8 | | 3 | 1 | 12 | 8 | | | | 0 | 48 |
| 10 | (France) Benoît Fulcrand | | | | | | | | | | 2 | | 3 | | 0 | 33 |
| 11 | (France) Vanessa Lemoine | | | | | 10 | | 4 | 5 | 5 | Ret | | | | 0 | 33 |
| 12 | (Italy) Maurizio Barone | 7 | | | | 11 | 4 | | | | 9 | 5 | | | 0 | 30 |
| 13 | (Sweden) Jonas Andersson | 1 | | | | | | | | | | | | | 0 | 25 |
| 14 | (France) Benoit Neyret-Gigot | | | | | | | | | | 1 | | | | 0 | 25 |
| 15 | (France) Damien Augustin | 2 | | | | | | | | 11 | Ret | | | | 0 | 18 |
| 16 | (France) Gilbert Dini | | | | | 13 | 3 | | | | 10 | | | | 0 | 16 |
| 17 | (Finland) Mikael Korhonen | | | | | | | | 3 | | | | | | 0 | 15 |
| 18 | (Italy) Massimiliano Bosi | 4 | | | | | | | | | | | | | 0 | 12 |
| 19 | (France) Sébastien Poujol | 5 | | | | | | | | | | | | | 0 | 10 |
| 20 | (United Kingdom) Stephen McAuley | | | | | 12 | | 9 | 7 | 9 | | | | | 0 | 10 |
| 21 | (Poland) Michał Kuśnierz | | | | | | | 6 | | | | | | | 0 | 8 |
| 22 | (Poland) Przemisław Mazur | | | | | 15 | | 7 | | | | | | | 0 | 6 |
| 23 | (France) Patrick Chiappe | 9 | | | | | | | | | | | | | 0 | 2 |
| 24 | (France) Maxime Vilmot^{4} | | | | | 9 | | | | | | | | | 0 | 2 |
| 25 | (Netherlands) Hein Verschuuren | | | | | | | | | 10 | | WD | | | 0 | 1 |
| Pos. | Co-driver | MON (Monaco) | SWE (Sweden) | MEX (Mexico) | ARG (Argentina) | POR (Portugal) | ITA (Italy) | POL (Poland) | FIN (Finland) | GER (Germany) | FRA (France) | ESP (Spain) | GBR (United Kingdom) | AUS (Australia) | Drops | Points |

Key
| Colour | Result |
|---|---|
| Gold | Winner |
| Silver | 2nd place |
| Bronze | 3rd place |
| Green | Points finish |
| Blue | Non-points finish |
| Blue | Non-classified finish (NC) |
| Purple | Did not finish (Ret) |
| Black | Excluded (EX) |
| Black | Disqualified (DSQ) |
| White | Did not start (DNS) |
| White | Cancelled (C) |
| Blank | Withdrew entry from the event (WD) |

Notes

- ^3 – Points earned with Michel Fabre
- ^4 – Points earned with Frédéric Hauswald

=== FIA WRC3 Championship for Teams ===
| Pos. | Team | MON (Monaco) | SWE (Sweden) | MEX (Mexico) | ARG (Argentina) | POR (Portugal) | ITA (Italy) | POL (Poland) | FIN (Finland) | GER (Germany) | FRA (France) | ESP (Spain) | GBR (United Kingdom) | AUS (Australia) | Points |
|---|---|---|---|---|---|---|---|---|---|---|---|---|---|---|---|
| 1 | (France) Saintéloc Junior Team | 4 | 1 | 1 | 1 | | | | | | | 3 | 3 | 1 | 142 |
| 2 | (Italy) Automobile Club d'Italia | 3 | | | | 3 | 1 | | 2 | 3 | | 1 | | | 113 |
| 3 | (Slovakia) Styllex Slovak National Team | | | | | 1 | | DNS | 4 | 1 | 2 | | 1 | | 105 |
| 4 | (Finland) Printsport | 1 | | | | 5 | | 2 | 1 | 7 | 5 | | | | 94 |
| 5 | (France) Renault Sport | | | | | 4 | | 4 | | 4 | 3 | 2 | 2 | | 87 |
| 6 | (France) Sébastien Loeb Racing | | | | | 2 | | 1 | Ret | 2 | 4 | | | | 73 |
| 7 | (United Arab Emirates) Abu Dhabi Racing Team | | | | | 6 | | 5 | 3 | 5 | Ret | | | | 43 |
| 8 | (France) Peugeot Rally Academy | 2 | | | | | | | | 6 | Ret | | | | 26 |
| 9 | Équipe de France FFSA | | | | | | | | | | 1 | | | | 25 |
| 10 | (Poland) RallyTechnology | | | | | | | 3 | | | | | | | 15 |
| Pos. | Team | MON (Monaco) | SWE (Sweden) | MEX (Mexico) | ARG (Argentina) | POR (Portugal) | ITA (Italy) | POL (Poland) | FIN (Finland) | GER (Germany) | FRA (France) | ESP (Spain) | GBR (United Kingdom) | AUS (Australia) | Points |

Key
| Colour | Result |
|---|---|
| Gold | Winner |
| Silver | 2nd place |
| Bronze | 3rd place |
| Green | Points finish |
| Blue | Non-points finish |
| Blue | Non-classified finish (NC) |
| Purple | Did not finish (Ret) |
| Black | Excluded (EX) |
| Black | Disqualified (DSQ) |
| White | Did not start (DNS) |
| White | Cancelled (C) |
| Blank | Withdrew entry from the event (WD) |
