= 2016 Monte Carlo Rally =

Motor rally competition

2016 Monte Carlo Rally 84ème Rallye Automobile Monte-Carlo
Round 1 of the 2016 World Rally Championship
Next event →
- Host country: Monaco
- Rally base: (France) Gap, Hautes-Alpes
- Dates run: 22 – 25 January 2016
- Stages: 16 (377.59 km; 234.62 miles)
- Stage surface: Tarmac and snow

Statistics
- Crews: 88 at start, 64 at finish

Overall results
- Overall winner: (France) Sébastien Ogier (France) Julien Ingrassia (Germany) Volkswagen Motorsport

The 2016 Monte Carlo Rally (formally known as the 84ème Rallye Automobile Monte-Carlo) was a motor racing event for rally cars that was held over four days between 21 and 24 January 2016. It marked the eighty-fourth running of the Monte Carlo Rally, and was the first round of the 2016 World Rally Championship, WRC-2 and WRC-3 seasons.

Defending World Champion Sébastien Ogier started the season with a win in Monte Carlo, his third consecutive in the principality and the 33rd of his WRC career.

== Entry list ==
Notable entrants
No.	Entrant	Class	Driver	Co-driver	Car	Tyre
1	(Germany) Volkswagen Motorsport	WRC	(France) Sébastien Ogier	(France) Julien Ingrassia	Volkswagen Polo R WRC	M
2	(Germany) Volkswagen Motorsport	WRC	(Finland) Jari-Matti Latvala	(Finland) Miikka Anttila	Volkswagen Polo R WRC	M
3	(Germany) Hyundai Motorsport	WRC	(Belgium) Thierry Neuville	(Belgium) Nicolas Gilsoul	Hyundai i20 WRC	M
4	(Germany) Hyundai Motorsport	WRC	(Spain) Dani Sordo	(Spain) Marc Martí	Hyundai i20 WRC	M
5	(United Kingdom) M-Sport World Rally Team	WRC	(Norway) Mads Østberg	(Norway) Ola Fløene	Ford Fiesta RS WRC	M
6	(United Kingdom) M-Sport World Rally Team	WRC	(France) Eric Camilli	(France) Nicolas Klinger	Ford Fiesta RS WRC	M
7	(France) Abu Dhabi Total World Rally Team	WRC	(United Kingdom) Kris Meeke	(Republic of Ireland) Paul Nagle	Citroën DS3 WRC	M
8	(France) Abu Dhabi Total World Rally Team	WRC	(France) Stéphane Lefebvre	(France) Gabin Moreau	Citroën DS3 WRC	M
9	(Germany) Volkswagen Motorsport II	WRC	(Norway) Andreas Mikkelsen	(Norway) Anders Jæger	Volkswagen Polo R WRC	M
10	(Germany) Hyundai Motorsport N	WRC	(New Zealand) Hayden Paddon	(New Zealand) John Kennard	Hyundai i20 WRC	M
12	(United Kingdom) DMACK World Rally Team	WRC	(Estonia) Ott Tänak	(Estonia) Raigo Mõlder	Ford Fiesta RS WRC	D
16	(Poland) Robert Kubica	WRC	(Poland) Robert Kubica	(Poland) Maciej Szczepaniak	Ford Fiesta RS WRC	P
17	(United Kingdom) M-Sport World Rally Team	WRC	(France) Bryan Bouffier	(France) Victor Bellotto	Ford Fiesta RS WRC	M
18	(Italy) Felice Re	WRC	(Italy) Felice Re	(Italy) Mara Bariani	Citroën DS3 WRC	P
32	(Austria) BRR Baumschlager Rallye & Racing Team	WRC-2	(Germany) Armin Kremer	(Germany) Pirmin Winklhofer	Škoda Fabia R5	P
33	(France) Julien Maurin	WRC-2	(France) Julien Maurin	(France) Benjamin Veillas	Škoda Fabia R5	P
34	(France) Quentin Giordano	WRC-2	(France) Quentin Giordano	(France) Valentin Sarreaud	Citroën DS3 R5	M
35	(United Kingdom) M-Sport World Rally Team	WRC-2	(United Kingdom) Elfyn Evans	(United Kingdom) Craig Parry	Ford Fiesta R5	M
36	(Romania) Napoca Rally Academy	WRC-2	(Italy) Simone Tempestini	(Italy) Matteo Chiarcossi	Ford Fiesta R5	P
37	(Italy) FWRT s.r.l.	WRC	(Italy) Lorenzo Bertelli	(Italy) Simone Scattolin	Ford Fiesta RS WRC	P
38	(France) Alain Foulon	WRC-2	(France) Alain Foulon	(France) Bernard Ferro	Mitsubishi Lancer Evolution X	M
39	(Greece) Jourdan Serderidis	WRC-2	(Greece) Jourdan Serderidis	(Belgium) Frédéric Miclotte	Citroën DS3 R5	M
40	(France) Quentin Gilbert	WRC-2	(France) Quentin Gilbert	(Belgium) Renaud Jamoul	Citroën DS3 R5	M
41	(France) Yoann Bonato	WRC-2	(France) Yoann Bonato	(France) Denis Giarudet	Citroën DS3 R5	P
42	(France) Peugeot Rally Academy	WRC-2	(Spain) José Antonio Suárez	(Spain) Cándido Carrera	Peugeot 208 T16 R5	M
44	(Mexico) Triviño World Rally Team	WRC-2	(Mexico) Ricardo Triviño	(Spain) Sergio Salom	Citroën DS3 R5	P
45	(France) Jean-Michel Raoux	WRC-2	(France) Jean-Michel Raoux	(France) Laurent Magat	Citroën DS3 R5	M
46	(Poland) The Ptock	WRC-2	(Poland) Hubert Ptaszek	(Poland) Kamil Kozdroń	Škoda Fabia R5	P
47	(Greece) Lasakris Foundation	WRC-2	(Greece) Lambros Athanassoulas	(Greece) Nikolaos Zakheos	Škoda Fabia R5	P
61	(Finland) Printsport	WRC-3	(Norway) Ole Christian Veiby	(Sweden) Jonas Andersson	Citroën DS3 R3T	M
62	(Italy) ACI Team Italia	WRC-3	(Italy) Fabio Andolfi	(Italy) Manuel Feloni	Peugeot 208 R2	P
63	(Italy) ACI Team Italia	WRC-3	(Italy) Damiano De Tommaso	(Italy) Massimiliano Bosi	Peueot 208 R2	P
64	(France) Peugeot Rally Academy	WRC-3	(France) Jordan Berfa	(France) Damien Augustin	Peugeot 208 R2	M
65	(Slovakia) Martin Koči	WRC-3	(Slovakia) Martin Koči	(Czech Republic) Lukáš Kostka	Citroën DS3 R3T	M
66	(France) Saintéloc Junior Team	WRC-3	(France) Michel Fabre	(France) Maxime Vilmot	Citroën DS3 R3T	M
67	(France) Igor Giusti	WRC-3	(France) Igor Giusti	(France) Patrick Chiappe	Peugeot 208 R2	M
68	(France) Vincent Dubert	WRC-3	(France) Vincent Dubert	(France) Sébastien Pujol	Citroën DS3 R3T	M
69	(Italy) Enrico Brazzoli	WRC-3	(Italy) Enrico Brazzoli	(Italy) Maurizio Barone	Peugeot 208 R2	P

Icon	Class
WRC	WRC entries eligible to score manufacturer points
WRC	Major entry ineligible to score manufacturer points
WRC-2	Registered to take part in WRC-2 championship
WRC-3	Registered to take part in WRC-3 championship

== Results ==
=== Event standings ===
Pos.	No.	Driver	Co-driver	Team	Car	Class	Time	Difference	Points
Overall classification
1	1	(France) Sébastien Ogier	(France) Julien Ingrassia	(Germany) Volkswagen Motorsport	Volkswagen Polo R WRC	WRC	3:49:53.1	0.0	28
2	9	(Norway) Andreas Mikkelsen	(Norway) Anders Jæger	(Germany) Volkswagen Motorsport II	Volkswagen Polo R WRC	WRC	3:51:47.6	+1:54.5	19
3	3	(Belgium) Thierry Neuville	(Belgium) Nicolas Gilsoul	(Germany) Hyundai Motorsport	Hyundai i20 WRC	WRC	3:53:11.0	+3:17.9	15
4	5	(Norway) Mads Østberg	(Norway) Ola Fløene	(United Kingdom) M-Sport World Rally Team	Ford Fiesta RS WRC	WRC	3:54:40.8	+4:47.7	12
5	8	(France) Stéphane Lefebvre	(France) Gabin Moreau	(France) Abu Dhabi Total World Rally Team	Citroën DS3 WRC	WRC	3:57:28.7	+7:35.6	10
6	4	(Spain) Dani Sordo	(Spain) Marc Martí	(Germany) Hyundai Motorsport	Hyundai i20 WRC	WRC	4:00:28.6	+10:35.5	10
7	12	(Estonia) Ott Tänak	(Estonia) Raigo Mõlder	(United Kingdom) DMACK World Rally Team	Ford Fiesta RS WRC	WRC	4:01:33.0	+11:39.9	6
8	35	(United Kingdom) Elfyn Evans	(United Kingdom) Craig Parry	(United Kingdom) M-Sport World Rally Team	Ford Fiesta R5	WRC-2	4:08:23.9	+18:30.8	4
9	48	(Finland) Esapekka Lappi	(Finland) Janne Ferm	(Finland) Esapekka Lappi	Skoda Fabia R5		4:10:34.1	+20:41.0	2
10	32	(Germany) Armin Kremer	(Germany) Pirmin Winklhofer	(Austria) BRR Baumschlager Rallye & Racing Team	Skoda Fabia R5	WRC-2	4:10:37.0	+20:43.9	1
WRC-2 standings
1 (8.)	35	(United Kingdom) Elfyn Evans	(United Kingdom) Craig Parry	(United Kingdom) M-Sport World Rally Team	Ford Fiesta R5	WRC-2	4:08:23.9	0.0	25
2 (10.)	32	(Germany) Armin Kremer	(Germany) Pirmin Winklhofer	(Austria) BRR Baumschlager Rallye & Racing Team	Škoda Fabia R5	WRC-2	4:10:37.0	+2:13.1	18
3 (11.)	40	(France) Quentin Gilbert	(Belgium) Renaud Jamoul	(France) Quentin Gilbert	Citron DS3 R5	WRC-2	4:10:58.1	+2:34.2	15
4 (13.)	34	(France) Quentin Giordano	(France) Valentin Sarreaud	(France) Quentin Giordano	Citron DS3 R5	WRC-2	4:14:56.5	+6:32.6	12
5 (15.)	41	(France) Yoann Bonato	(France) Denis Giraudet	(France) Yoann Bonato	Citron DS3 R5	WRC-2	4:20:09.6	+11:49.7	10
6 (17.)	42	(Spain) José Antonio Suárez	(Spain) Cándido Carrera	(France) Quentin Giordano	Peugeot 208 T16 R5	WRC-2	4:26:42.2	+18:18.3	8
7 (18.)	46	(Poland) Hubert Ptaszek	(Poland) Kamil Kozdroń	(Poland) The Ptock	Škoda Fabia R5	WRC-2	4:30:15.7	+21:51.8	6
8 (22.)	47	(Greece) Lambros Athanassoulas	(Greece) Nikolaus Zakheos	(Greece) Lasakris Foundation	Škoda Fabia R5	WRC-2	4:34:48.3	+26:24.4	4
9 (39.)	36	(Italy) Simone Tempestini	(Italy) Matteo Chiarcossi	(Romania) Napoca Rally Academy	Ford Fiesta R5	WRC-2	4:50:58.7	+42:34.8	2
10 (51.)	38	(France) Alain Foulon	(France) Bernard Ferro	(France) Alain Foulon	Mitsubishi Lancer Evo X	WRC-2	5:00:47.1	+52:23.2	1
WRC-3 standings
1 (19.)	61	(Norway) Ole Christian Feiby	(Sweden) Jonas Andersson	(Finland) Printsport	Citroën DS3 R3T	WRC-3	4:30:42.9	0.0	25
2 (21.)	64	(France) Jordan Berfa	(France) Damien Augustin	(France) Peugeot Rally Academy	Peugeot 208 R2	WRC-3	4:34:29.5	+3:46.6	18
3 (23.)	62	(Italy) Fabio Andolfi	(Italy) Manuel Fenoli	(Italy) ACI Team Italia	Peugeot 208 R2	WRC-3	4:35:12.5	+4:29.6	15
4 (24.)	63	(Italy) Damiano De Tommaso	(Italy) Massimiliano Bosi	(Italy) ACI Team Italia	Peugeot 208 R2	WRC-3	4:36:54.5	+6:11.6	12
5 (34.)	68	(France) Vincent Dubert	(France) Sébastien Pujol	(France) Vincent Dubert	Citroën DS3 R3T	WRC-3	4:46:41.6	+15:58.7	10
6 (38.)	65	(Slovakia) Martin Koči	(Czech Republic) Lukáš Kostka	(Slovakia) Martin Koči	Citroën DS3 R3T	WRC-3	4:49:14.4	+18:31.5	8
7 (45.)	69	(Italy) Enrico Brazzoli	(Italy) Maurizio Barone	(Italy) Enrico Brazzoli	Peugeot 208 R2	WRC-3	4:56:34.9	+25:52.0	6
8 (49.)	66	(France) Michel Fabre	(France) Maxime Vilmot	(France) Saintéloc Junior Team	Citroën DS3 R3T	WRC-3	5:00:24.6	+29:41.7	4
9 (56.)	51	(France) Igor Giusti	(France) Patrick Chiappe	(France) Igor Giusti	Peugeot 208 R2	WRC-3	5:06:02.2	+35:19.3	2

=== Special stages ===
Day	Stage	Name	Length	Winner	Car	Time	Rally leader
Leg 1 (21 Jan)	SS1	Entrevaux – Val de Chalvagne - Rouaine	21.25 km	(France) Sébastien Ogier	Volkswagen Polo R WRC	12:21.9	(France) Sébastien Ogier
Leg 1 (21 Jan)	SS2	Barles – Seyne	20.38 km	(United Kingdom) Kris Meeke	Citroën DS3 WRC	13:06.1	(United Kingdom) Kris Meeke
Leg 2 (22 Jan)	SS3	Corps – La Salle en Beaumont 1	14.65 km	(France) Sébastien Ogier	Volkswagen Polo R WRC	8:07.5	(United Kingdom) Kris Meeke
Leg 2 (22 Jan)	SS4	Aspres les Corps – Chauffayer 1	25.78 km	(United Kingdom) Kris Meeke	Citroën DS3 WRC	13:55.9	(United Kingdom) Kris Meeke
Leg 2 (22 Jan)	SS5	Les Costes – Chaillol 1	17.82 km	(France) Sébastien Ogier	Volkswagen Polo R WRC	9:23.6	(France) Sébastien Ogier
Leg 2 (22 Jan)	SS6	Corps – La Salle en Beaumont 2	14.65 km	(France) Sébastien Ogier	Volkswagen Polo R WRC	8:05.4	(France) Sébastien Ogier
Leg 2 (22 Jan)	SS7	Aspres les Corps – Chauffayer 2	25.78 km	(United Kingdom) Kris Meeke	Citroën DS3 WRC	14:16.9	(United Kingdom) Kris Meeke
Leg 2 (22 Jan)	SS8	Les Costes – Chaillol 2	17.82 km	(France) Sébastien Ogier	Volkswagen Polo R WRC	9:31.3	(France) Sébastien Ogier
Leg 3 (23 Jan)	SS9	Lardier et Valenca – Faye 1	51.55 km	(France) Sébastien Ogier	Volkswagen Polo R WRC	30:47.8	(France) Sébastien Ogier
Leg 3 (23 Jan)	SS10	St Léger Les Mélèzes – La Bâtie Neuve 1	17.13 km	(Norway) Andreas Mikkelsen	Volkswagen Polo R WRC	12:01.3	(France) Sébastien Ogier
Leg 3 (23 Jan)	SS11	Lardier et Valenca – Faye 2	51.55 km	(United Kingdom) Kris Meeke	Citroën DS3 WRC	30:26.6	(France) Sébastien Ogier
Leg 3 (23 Jan)	SS12	St Léger Les Mélèzes – La Bâtie Neuve 2	17.13 km	(Belgium) Thierry Neuville	Hyundai i20 WRC	11:39.6	(France) Sébastien Ogier
Leg 3 (23 Jan)	SS13	Sisteron – Thoard	36.60 km	(Belgium) Thierry Neuville	Hyundai i20 WRC	22:55.4	(France) Sébastien Ogier
Leg 4 (24 Jan)	SS14	Col de l’Orme – St Laurent 1	12.02 km	(France) Sébastien Ogier	Volkswagen Polo R WRC	8:15.0	(France) Sébastien Ogier
Leg 4 (24 Jan)	SS15	La Bollène Vésubie – Peira Cava	21.36 km	(Norway) Andreas Mikkelsen	Volkswagen Polo R WRC	14:09.2	(France) Sébastien Ogier
Leg 4 (24 Jan)	SS16	Col de l’Orme – St Laurent 2 (Power stage)	12.02 km	(France) Sébastien Ogier	Volkswagen Polo R WRC	8:09.6	(France) Sébastien Ogier

=== Power Stage ===
The "Power stage" was a 12.02 km (7.47 mi) stage at the end of the rally.

Pos	Driver	Car	Time	Diff.	Pts
1	(France) Sébastien Ogier	Volkswagen Polo R WRC	8:09.6	0.0	3
2	(Spain) Dani Sordo	Hyundai i20 WRC	8:11.0	+1.4	2
3	(Norway) Andreas Mikkelsen	Volkswagen Polo R WRC	8:15.5	+5.9	1

== Championship standings after the event ==
=== WRC ===
Drivers' Championship standings

Pos.	Driver	Points
1	(France) Sébastien Ogier	28
2	(Norway) Andreas Mikkelsen	19
3	(Belgium) Thierry Neuville	15
4	(Norway) Mads Østberg	12
5	(France) Stéphane Lefebvre	10

Manufacturers' Championship standings

Pos.	Constructor	Points
1	(Germany) Volkswagen Motorsport	25
2	(Germany) Hyundai Motorsport	25
3	(Germany) Volkswagen Motorsport II	18
4	(United Kingdom) M-Sport World Rally Team	12
5	(United Kingdom) DMACK World Team	8

=== Other ===
WRC2 Drivers' Championship standings

Pos.	Driver	Points
1	(United Kingdom) Elfyn Evans	25
2	(Germany) Armin Kremer	18
3	(France) Quentin Gilbert	15
4	(France) Quentin Giordano	12
5	(France) Yoann Bonato	10

WRC3 Drivers' Championship standings

Pos.	Driver	Points
1	(Norway) Ole Christian Veiby	25
2	(France) Jordan Berfa	18
3	(Italy) Fabio Andolfi	15
4	(Italy) Damiano De Tommaso	12
5	(France) Vincent Dubert	10
