= Marangoni =

Marangoni is an Italian surname. Notable people with the surname include:

- Alan Marangoni (born 1984), Italian cyclist
- Alessandro Marangoni (born 1979), Italian classical pianist
- Carla Marangoni (1915–2018), Italian gymnast
- Carlo Marangoni (1840–1925), Italian physicist
  - Marangoni effect
  - Marangoni number
- Claudio Marangoni (born 1954), Argentine footballer
- Fernando Marangoni (born 1980), Brazilian politician
- Giovanni Marangoni (1673–1753), Italian Roman Catholic priest and antiquarian
- Rodrigo Marangoni (born 1978), Argentine footballer
