= WRC3 =

FIA rally championship

- Category: Group Rally3
- Country: International
- Inaugural season: 2013
- Tire suppliers: P
- Drivers' champion: (Italy) Matteo Fontana
- Co-Drivers' champion: (Italy) Alessandro Arnaboldi
- Official website: www.wrc.com

The FIA WRC3 is a support championship of the World Rally Championship. The calendar consists of the same rallies and stages as the parent series and crews usually compete immediately after WRC2 entrants. Entry into WRC3 is limited to cars that are based on production models and homologated under Group Rally3 rules, although prior to 2022 Group Rally2 cars were used. There are championship titles awarded to drivers and co-drivers. The series began in 2013 and was limited to production-based cars homologated under the R1, R2 and R3 rules, until its cancellation at the end of 2018. The current format of the series began in 2020.

== History ==
From 2013 the previous Production World Rally Championship was cancelled and replaced by WRC-3. With the introduction of Group R the new WRC-3 was contested by 2WD production based cars from R1, R2 and R3 classes. Teams and drivers competing in the series were free to contest any rallies forming the World Rally Championship. They had to nominate up to six events to score points in, and their best five results from these six events counted towards their final championship points score. From 2017 this was changed to nominating seven rounds of which their six best results counted. In 2018, FIA announced that the World Rally Championship-3 was being discontinued, with all WRC championships becoming four wheel drive with the exception of Junior WRC.

The 2019 season saw the running of two championships in support of the World Rally Championship using Group Rally2 cars. These were known as WRC 2 Pro for professional crews and manufacturer teams, and WRC 2 for privateers. However, this multi-class structure was found to be too confusing, with customer drivers in WRC 2 Pro whilst manufacturer teams were unofficially supporting WRC 2 entries. The categories were renamed again and the WRC3 name was revived in 2020. Professional crews would now contest WRC2 whilst privateers would contest the WRC3 where teams were not allowed to enter. Stricter rules on entry eligibility were introduced in 2021 clarifying the line between professional and privateer.

In March 2021 the FIA announced that from the 2022 season WRC3 would be a Group Rally3 car based championship with Open and Junior category titles, also with championship titles for teams. These two categories were reduced to just one WRC3 title for Drivers and Co-Drivers in 2023 with no provision for teams.

The 2022 FIA WRC3 Junior category consisted of Junior WRC, an arrive-and-drive style format competition organized by M-Sport. Crews born on or after 1 January 1993 registered for the championship and contested up to 5 rallies as set by M-Sport using Ford Fiesta Rally3 cars provided. This category was replaced by the restored FIA Junior WRC in 2023.

== Rules ==
In 2023, WRC3 entries can be made in the name of the driver or competitor. Other than the use of Rally3 cars, there are no restrictions on entry eligibility. Crews can compete in any rally on the WRC calendar but must nominate beforehand any rally that will count towards their WRC3 championship up to a maximum of 5 rounds, with the best 4 results contributing to the championship points tally.

Since 2024, crews can nominate a maximum of 7 rounds, with the best 6 results contributing to the championship points tally.

Power Stage points also contributed during the 2021 season but were removed for the following season.

== Results ==
=== Drivers' Championship ===
Group	Year	Champion	Car	2nd place	Car	3rd place	Car
Rally3	2025	(Italy) Matteo Fontana	Ford Fiesta Rally3	(Australia) Taylor Gill	Ford Fiesta Rally3	(France) Ghjuvanni Rossi	Ford Fiesta Rally3
Rally3	2024	(Paraguay) Diego Domínguez Jr.	Ford Fiesta Rally3	(France) Mattéo Chatillon	Renault Clio Rally3	(Estonia) Romet Jürgenson	Ford Fiesta Rally3
Rally3	2023	(Finland) Roope Korhonen	Ford Fiesta Rally3	(Paraguay) Diego Domínguez Jr.	Ford Fiesta Rally3	(Canada) Jason Bailey	Ford Fiesta Rally3
Rally3	2022	(Finland) Lauri Joona	Ford Fiesta Rally3	(Czech Republic) Jan Černý	Ford Fiesta Rally3	(Finland) Sami Pajari	Ford Fiesta Rally3
Rally2	2021	(France) Yohan Rossel	Citroën C3 Rally2	(Poland) Kajetan Kajetanowicz	Škoda Fabia Rally2 evo	(Finland) Emil Lindholm	Škoda Fabia Rally2 evo
Rally2	2020	(Finland) Jari Huttunen	Hyundai i20 R5	(Bolivia) Marco Bulacia	Citroën C3 R5	(Poland) Kajetan Kajetanowicz	Škoda Fabia Rally2 evo
2wd Group R	2018	(Italy) Enrico Brazzoli	Peugeot 208 R2	(Finland) Taisko Lario	Peugeot 208 R2	(Sweden) Emil Bergkvist	Ford Fiesta R2T
2wd Group R	2017	(Spain) Nil Solans	Ford Fiesta R2T	(France) Raphaël Astier	Peugeot 208 R2	(France) Nicolas Ciamin	Ford Fiesta R2T
2wd Group R	2016	(Italy) Simone Tempestini	Citroën DS3 R3T	(France) Michel Fabre	Citroën DS3 R3T	(Italy) Fabio Andolfi	Peugeot 208 R2
2wd Group R	2015	(France) Quentin Gilbert	Citroën DS3 R3T	(Norway) Ole Christian Veiby	Citroën DS3 R3T	(Italy) Simone Tempestini	Citroën DS3 R3T
2wd Group R	2014	(France) Stéphane Lefebvre	Citroën DS3 R3T	(United Kingdom) Alastair Fisher	Citroën DS3 R3T	(Slovakia) Martin Koči	Citroën DS3 R3T
2wd Group R	2013	(France) Sébastien Chardonnet	Citroën DS3 R3T	(Republic of Ireland) Keith Cronin	Citroën DS3 R3T	(France) Quentin Gilbert	Citroën DS3 R3T

=== Co-Drivers' Championship ===
Group	Year	Champion	Car	2nd Place	Car	3rd Place	Car
Rally3	2025	(Italy) Alessandro Arnaboldi	Ford Fiesta Rally3	(Australia) Daniel Brkic	Ford Fiesta Rally3	(France) Kylian Sarmezan	Ford Fiesta Rally3
Rally3	2024	(Spain) Rogelio Peñate	Ford Fiesta Rally3	(France) Maxence Cornuau	Renault Clio Rally3	(Estonia) Siim Oja	Ford Fiesta Rally3
Rally3	2023	(Finland) Anssi Viinikka	Ford Fiesta Rally3	(Spain) Rogelio Peñate	Ford Fiesta Rally3	(Belgium) Loïc Dumont	Ford Fiesta Rally3
Rally3	2022	(Finland) Enni Mälkönen	Ford Fiesta Rally3	(Finland) Mikael Korhonen	Ford Fiesta Rally3	(Hungary) Tamás Kürti	Ford Fiesta Rally3
Rally2	2021	(Poland) Maciek Szczepaniak	Škoda Fabia Rally2 evo	(France) Alexandre Coria	Citroën C3 Rally2	(United Kingdom) Ross Whittock	Škoda Fabia Rally2 evo
Rally2	2020	(Finland) Mikko Lukka	Hyundai i20 R5	(Poland) Maciek Szczepaniak	Škoda Fabia Rally2 evo	(Republic of Ireland) Aaron Johnston	Volkswagen Polo GTI R5
2wd Group R	2018	(Italy) Luca Beltrame	Peugeot 208 R2; Citroën DS3 R3T	(Finland) Tatu Hämäläinen	Peugeot 208 R2	(Sweden) Johan Johansson	Ford Fiesta R2T
2wd Group R	2017	(Spain) Miquel Ibañez	Ford Fiesta R2T	(France) Frédéric Vauclare	Peugeot 208 R2	(France) Thibault De La Haye	Ford Fiesta R2T
2wd Group R	2016	(Italy) Giovanni Bernacchini	Citroën DS3 R3T	(France) Maxime Vilmot	Citroën DS3 R3T	(Italy) Manuel Fenoli	Peugeot 208 R2
2wd Group R	2015	(Belgium) Renaud Jamoul	Citroën DS3 R3T	(Norway) Anders Jeager	Citroën DS3 R3T	(Italy) Matteo Chiarcossi	Citroën DS3 R3T
2wd Group R	2014	(France) Thomas Dubois	Citroën DS3 R3T	(United Kingdom) Gordon Noble	Citroën DS3 R3T	(Czech Republic) Lukáš Kostka	Citroën DS3 R3T
2wd Group R	2013	(France) Thibault De La Haye	Citroën DS3 R3T	(United Kingdom) Marshall Clarke	Citroën DS3 R3T	(Belgium) Lara Vanneste	Citroën DS3 R3T

=== Teams' Championship ===
Season	Champion
2022	(Czech Republic) Jan Černý
2020–2021	Not awarded
2018	(Italy) ACI Team Italia
2017	(Germany) ADAC Sachsen
2016	(France) Saintéloc Junior Team
2015	(Finland) Printsport
2014	(Germany) ADAC Team Weser-Ems e.V.
2013	(United Kingdom) Charles Hurst Citroën Belfast
