= DMACK =

DMACK Tyres
- Company type: Private
- Industry: Design and manufacturing
- Founded: 2008; 18 years ago
- Founder: Dick Cormack
- Headquarters: Rovereto, Italy
- Area served: Worldwide
- Key people: Dick Cormack (Managing Director)
- Products: Specialty and Niche Market Tyres
- Subsidiaries: DMACK Holdings Ltd.

DMACK, the parent company of DMACK Holdings Ltd., is a Rovereto, Italy, based tyre manufacturer which started as a company based in Carlisle, United Kingdom.

== History ==
DMACK was founded in 2008 by Dick Cormack to deliver smaller tyre sizes than the ones supplied by industry giants, such as Michelin and Goodyear, specifically for the rally market.

=== Proposed UK factory ===
DMACK worked with Lehman Lee & Xu, the British government, and local authorities in its plans to build a tyre factory near Carlisle, England. The facility was scheduled to be complete by the end of 2017. It was speculated that it could bring up to 500 jobs when production is up to full scale. Its goal was to manufacture 2 million tyres a year, mostly for motorsport specialist markets. By 2019 Dick Cormack confirmed that the plans for the factory in the UK had been scrapped due to a cancelled investment deal.

=== Production move to the UK ===
By 2016 DMACK had shifted production from China to the UK after striking a deal with Cooper Tire & Rubber Company

=== Relocation to Italy ===
DMACK's UK-based company, DMACK Global, went into administration in 2019 and a second company was incorporated in Italy: DMACK SRL. It also signed a deal to use Marangoni tyre factory for producing its tyres.

== DMACK Holdings Ltd. ==
DMACK Holdings Ltd., a Wholly Foreign-Owned Enterprise, is a subsidiary corporation owned by Cormack. It was created for the purpose of assisting business in China on behalf of its parent company, DMACK. The director and sole shareholder is Robert Walker. DMACK Holdings Ltd. has become one of the leading suppliers of race car tyres in their specific market, and the corporation owns tyre production factories in China.

== Motorsport ==
Beginning with the 2011 season, DMACK began supplying tyres for the Scottish Rally Championship and the Production World Rally Championship. The company made its World Rally Championship debut at the 2011 Wales Rally GB on the car of Ott Tänak. The team was disbanded before the 2018 World Rally Championship season.
