= 2016 Rally Catalunya =

Motor rally competition

2016 Rally de España: 52. RallyRACC Catalunya – Costa Daurada 2016
Round 11 of the 2016 World Rally Championship
← Previous event	Next event →
- Rally base: (Spain) Salou
- Dates run: 13 – 16 October 2016
- Stages: 19 (321.08 km; 199.51 miles)
- Stage surface: Tarmac and gravel

Overall results
- Overall winner: (France) Sébastien Ogier (France) Julien Ingrassia (Germany) Volkswagen Motorsport

The 2016 Rally Catalunya (formally the 52. RallyRACC Catalunya – Costa Daurada) was the eleventh round of the 2016 World Rally Championship. The race was held over four days between 13 October and 16 October 2016, and was based in Salou, Catalonia, Spain. Volkswagen's Sébastien Ogier won the race, his 37th win in the World Rally Championship, securing his fourth world champion title.

== Overall standings ==
Pos.	No.	Driver	Co-driver	Team	Car	Class	Time	Difference	Points
Overall classification
1	1	(France) Sébastien Ogier	(France) Julien Ingrassia	(Germany) Volkswagen Motorsport	Volkswagen Polo R WRC	WRC	3:13:03.6		27
2	4	(Spain) Dani Sordo	(Spain) Marc Martí	(Germany) Hyundai Motorsport	Hyundai i20 WRC	WRC	3:13:19.2	+15.6	19
3	3	(Belgium) Thierry Neuville	(Belgium) Nicolas Gilsoul	(Germany) Hyundai Motorsport	Hyundai i20 WRC	WRC	3:14:18.6	+1:15.0	15
4	20	(New Zealand) Hayden Paddon	(New Zealand) John Kennard	(Germany) Hyundai Motorsport N	Hyundai i20 WRC	WRC	3:14:31.4	+1:27.8	12
5	5	(Norway) Mads Østberg	(Norway) Ola Fløene	(United Kingdom) M-Sport World Rally Team	Ford Fiesta RS WRC	WRC	3:16:28.0	+3:24.4	10
6	12	(Estonia) Ott Tänak	(Estonia) Raigo Mõlder	(United Kingdom) DMACK World Rally Team	Ford Fiesta RS WRC	WRC	3:18:28.5	+5:24.9	8
7	10	(Netherlands) Kevin Abbring	(United Kingdom) Sebastian Marshall	(Germany) Hyundai Motorsport N	Hyundai i20 WRC	WRC	3:20:34.9	+7:31.3	6
8	34	(Czech Republic) Jan Kopecký	(Czech Republic) Pavel Dresler	(Czech Republic) Škoda Motorsport	Škoda Fabia R5	WRC-2	3:22:08.7	+9:05.1	4
9	33	(Sweden) Pontus Tidemand	(Sweden) Jonas Andersson	(Czech Republic) Škoda Motorsport	Škoda Fabia R5	WRC-2	3:22:24.0	+9:20.4	2
10	8	(Republic of Ireland) Craig Breen	(United Kingdom) Scott Martin	(France) Abu Dhabi Total World Rally Team	Citroën DS3 WRC	WRC	3:23:00.7	+9:57.1	1
14	2	(Finland) Jari-Matti Latvala	(Finland) Miikka Anttila	(Germany) Volkswagen Motorsport	Volkswagen Polo R WRC	WRC	3:34:38.0	+21:34.4	3

== Special stages ==
Day	Stage	Name	Length	Winner	Car	Time	Rally leader
Leg 1	SS1	Barcelona (tarmac)	3.20 km	(Estonia) Ott Tänak	Ford Fiesta RS WRC	3:47.6	(Estonia) Ott Tänak
Leg 1	SS2	Caseres 1 (gravel)	12.50 km	(Belgium) Thierry Neuville	Hyundai i20 WRC	7:39.9	(Belgium) Thierry Neuville
Leg 1	SS3	Bot 1 (gravel)	6.50 km	(Finland) Jari-Matti Latvala	Volkswagen Polo R WRC	4:12.0	(France) Sébastien Ogier
Leg 1	SS4	Terra Alta 1 (gravel & tarmac)	38.95 km	(Finland) Jari-Matti Latvala	Volkswagen Polo R WRC	25:48.7	(France) Sébastien Ogier
Leg 1	SS5	Caseres 2 (gravel)	12.50 km	(Spain) Dani Sordo	Hyundai i20 WRC	7:57.3	(Spain) Dani Sordo
Leg 1	SS6	Bot 2 (gravel)	6.50 km	(Spain) Dani Sordo	Hyundai i20 WRC	4:06.0	(Spain) Dani Sordo
Leg 1	SS7	Terra Alta 2 (gravel & tarmac)	38.95 km	(United Kingdom) Kris Meeke	Citroën DS3 WRC	24:50.1	(Spain) Dani Sordo
Leg 2	SS8	Vilaplana (tarmac)	6.28 km	(Finland) Jari-Matti Latvala	Volkswagen Polo R WRC	4:03.4	(Spain) Dani Sordo
Leg 2	SS9	Alcover-Capafonts 1 (tarmac)	19.93 km	(Finland) Jari-Matti Latvala	Volkswagen Polo R WRC	11:05.9	(Spain) Dani Sordo
Leg 2	SS10	Querol 1 (tarmac)	21.26 km	(France) Sébastien Ogier	Volkswagen Polo R WRC	11:12.9	(Spain) Dani Sordo
Leg 2	SS11	El Montmell 1 (tarmac)	24.14 km	(France) Sébastien Ogier	Volkswagen Polo R WRC	12:27.3	(Spain) Dani Sordo
Leg 2	SS12	Alcover-Capafonts 2 (tarmac)	19.93 km	(France) Sébastien Ogier	Volkswagen Polo R WRC	11:02.0	(Spain) Dani Sordo
Leg 2	SS13	Querol 2 (tarmac)	21.26 km	(France) Sébastien Ogier	Volkswagen Polo R WRC	11:14.3	(Spain) Dani Sordo
Leg 2	SS14	El Montmell 2 (tarmac)	24.14 km	(France) Sébastien Ogier	Volkswagen Polo R WRC	12:29.3	(France) Sébastien Ogier
Leg 2	SS15	Salou (tarmac)	2.24 km	(United Kingdom) Kris Meeke	Citroën DS3 WRC	2:33.0	(France) Sébastien Ogier
Leg 3	SS16	Pratdip 1 (tarmac)	19.30 km	(France) Sébastien Ogier	Volkswagen Polo R WRC	10:58.3	(France) Sébastien Ogier
Leg 3	SS17	Duesaigües 1 (tarmac)	12.10 km	(Finland) Jari-Matti Latvala	Volkswagen Polo R WRC	8:00.4	(France) Sébastien Ogier
Leg 3	SS18	Pratdip 2 (tarmac)	19.30 km	(Finland) Jari-Matti Latvala	Volkswagen Polo R WRC	10:53.1	(France) Sébastien Ogier
Leg 3	SS19	Duesaigües 2 (tarmac) [Power Stage]	12.10 km	(Finland) Jari-Matti Latvala	Volkswagen Polo R WRC	7:55.8	(France) Sébastien Ogier

=== Power Stage ===
The "Power stage" was a 12.10 km (7.52 mi) stage at the end of the rally.

Pos	Driver	Car	Time	Diff.	Pts
1	(Finland) Jari-Matti Latvala	Volkswagen Polo R WRC	7:55.8	0.0	3
2	(France) Sébastien Ogier	Volkswagen Polo R WRC	7:57.4	+1.6	2
3	(Spain) Dani Sordo	Hyundai i20 WRC	7:59.0	+3.2	1
