= Volkswagen Polo R WRC =

Volkswagen rally car built for competition in the World Rally Championship

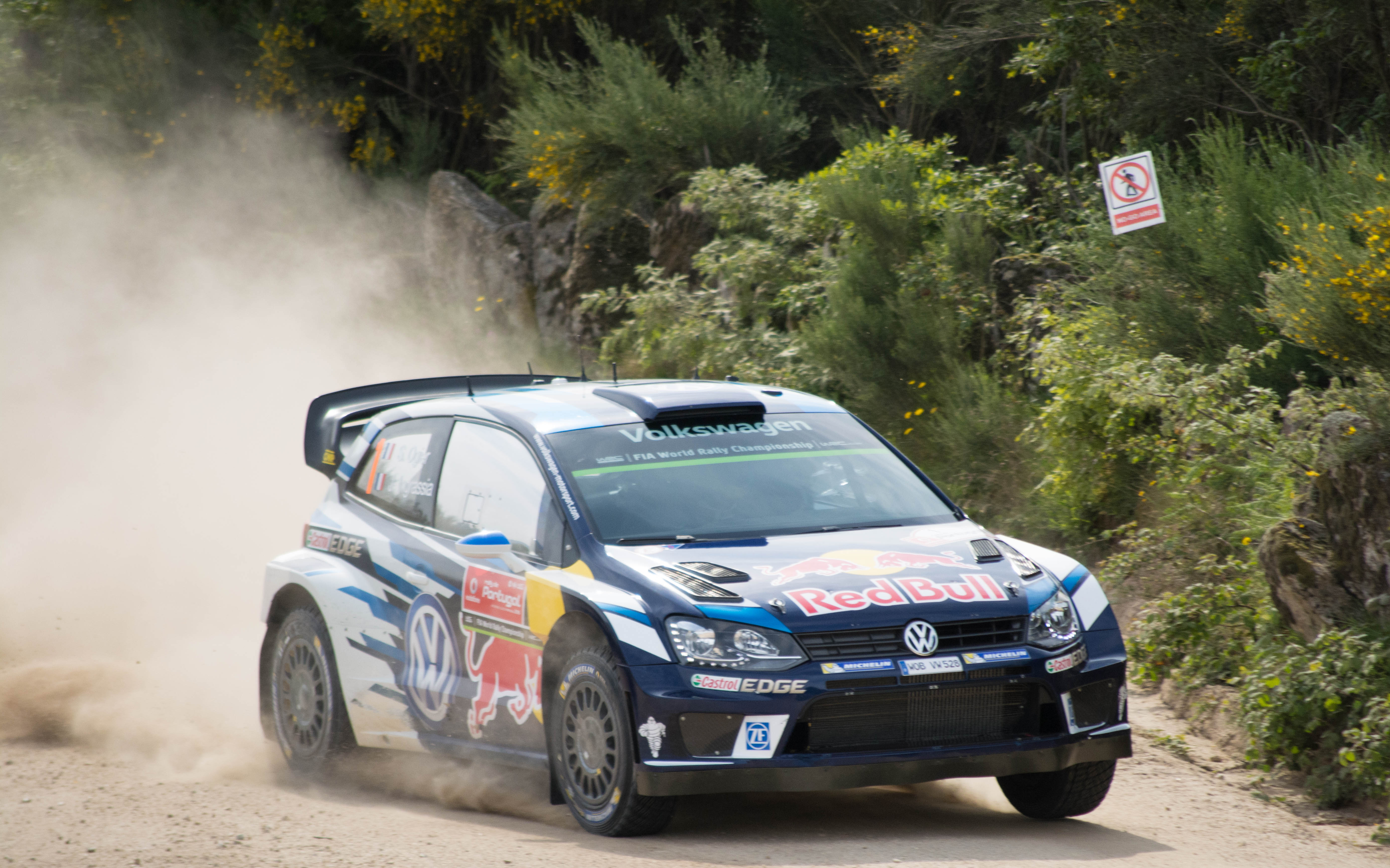
- Sébastien Ogier and co-driver Julien Ingrassia at the 2016 Rally de Portugal.
- Category: World Rally Car
- Constructor: Volkswagen Motorsport
- Designer: Heinz-Jakob Neußer (Technical Director)
- Successor: Volkswagen Polo WRC (cancelled); Volkswagen Polo GTI R5

Technical specifications
- Chassis: Reinforced body with welded, multi-point roll cage built to FIA specifications
- Suspension: MacPherson-type struts with ZF Friedrichshafen dampers
- Length: 3,976 mm (156.5 in)
- Width: 1,820 mm (72 in)
- Height: 1,356 mm (53.4 in)
- Axle track: 1,610 mm (63 in)
- Wheelbase: 2,480 mm (98 in)
- Engine: 1.6 L (98 cu in) bespoke Volkswagen straight-four engine, turbocharged with anti-lag system and 33 mm (1.3 in) air restrictor, transversally mounted
- Transmission: Bespoke Volkswagen 6-speed sequential manual transmission, transversally mounted with front and rear multi-plate limited-slip differential
- Weight: 1,200 kg (2,646 lb) before drivers or fuel
- Fuel: Customised controlled blend specified by FIA for all cars competing under World Rally Car regulations
- Lubricants: Castrol EDGE
- Tyres: Michelin competition tyres: 46 cm (18 in) for tarmac events, 38 cm (15 in) for gravel rallies

Competition history (WRC)
- Notable entrants: (Germany) Volkswagen Motorsport (Germany) Volkswagen Motorsport II
- Notable drivers: (Finland) Jari-Matti Latvala (Norway) Andreas Mikkelsen (France) Sébastien Ogier
- Debut: (Monaco) 2013 Monte Carlo Rally
- First win: 2013 Rally Sweden
- Last win: 2016 Rally Australia
- Last event: 2016 Rally Australia
Races	Wins	Podiums	Titles
52	43	87	12
- Constructors' Championships: 2013, 2014, 2015 and 2016 FIA World Rally Championship for Manufacturers
- Drivers' Championships: 2013, 2014, 2015 and 2016 FIA World Rally Championship for Drivers

The Volkswagen Polo R WRC is a World Rally Car built and operated by Volkswagen Motorsport and based on the Volkswagen Polo for use in the World Rally Championship. The car, which made its début at the start of the 2013 season, is built to the second generation of World Rally Car regulations introduced in 2011.

The Polo R WRC marks Volkswagen's second entry into the World Rally Championship as a manufacturer. Volkswagen Motorsport had previously entered the Volkswagen Golf GTI and GTI 16V in rallies between 1983 and 1988, while the company also made the Volkswagen Golf Mk3 and Mk4 available as a kit car to privateer entries during the Group A era from 1993 to 1997.

The car was extremely successful from its début, winning 43 of the 53 rallies that it entered, and scoring 37 more podiums. Sébastien Ogier won 31 rallies and four consecutive FIA World Rally Championships for Drivers between 2013 and 2016, whilst Volkswagen Motorsport secured the FIA World Rally Championship for Manufacturers in all four years. The Polo R WRC was retired from competition at the end of the 2016 season when Volkswagen withdrew from the category. A Polo built to Group R5 specifications was later commissioned for use in the World Rally Championship-2.

== Development ==
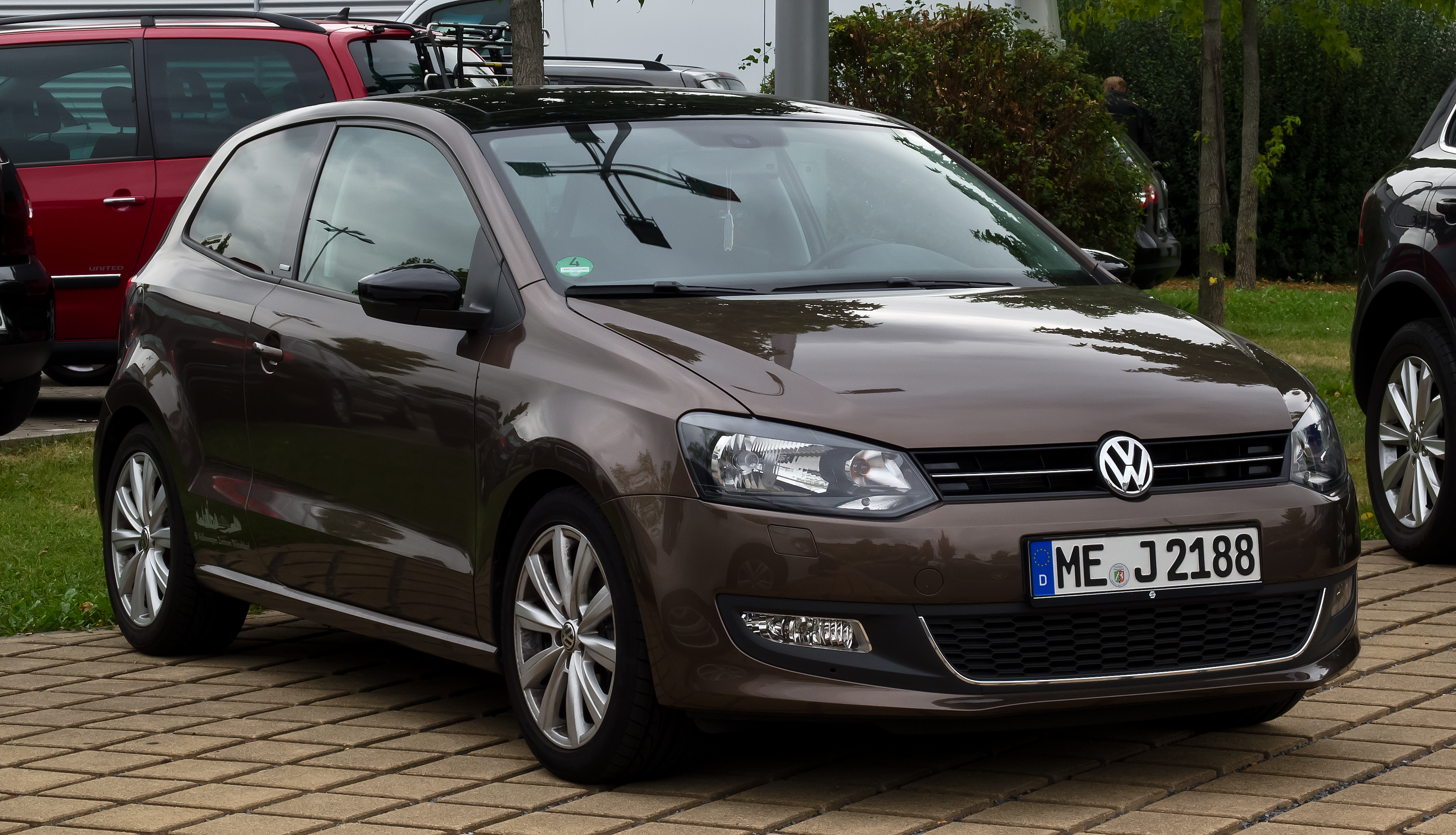

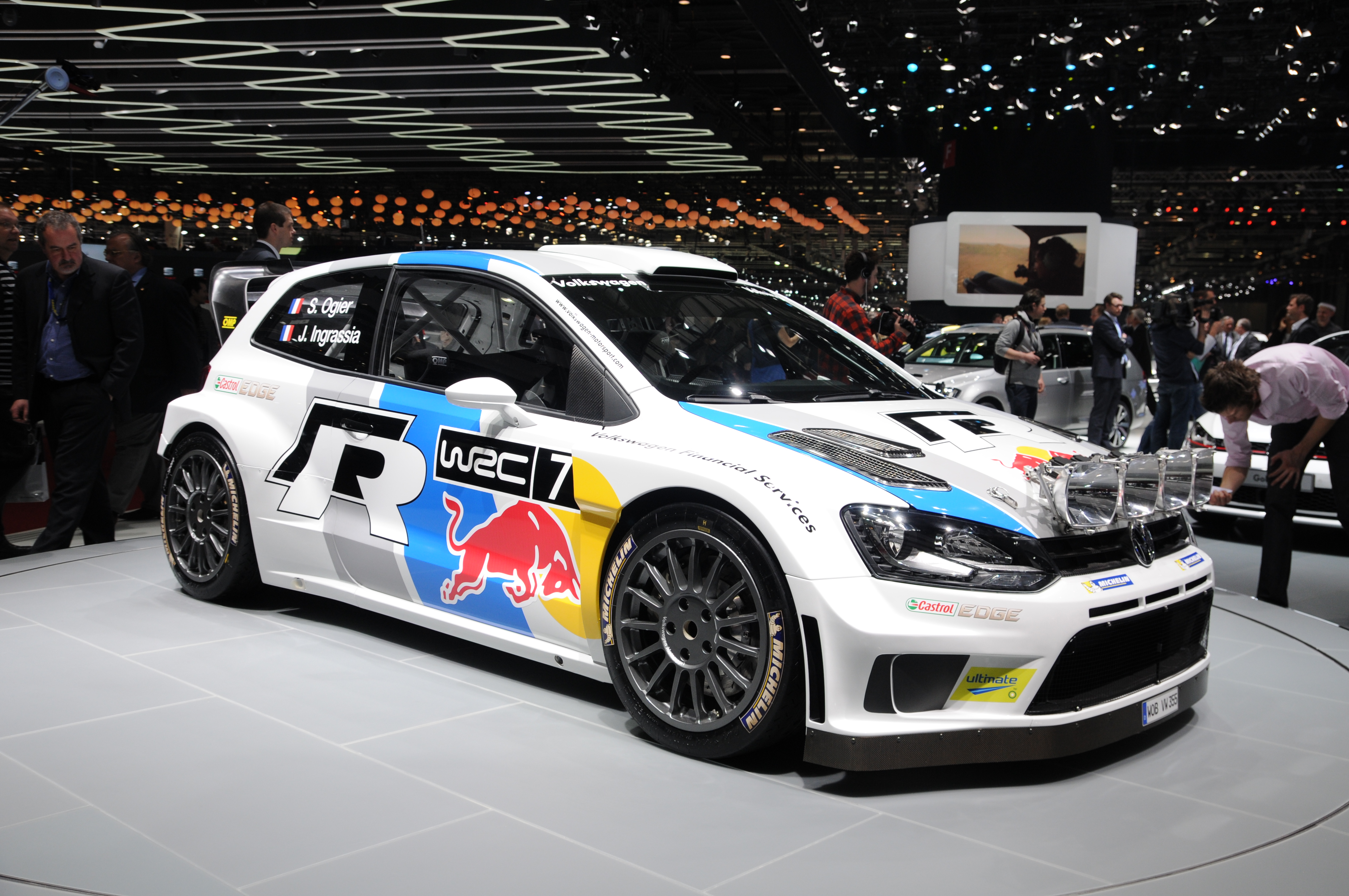
The road-going version of the Volkswagen Polo Mk5 (top) serves as the basis for the Polo R WRC (bottom).

The Polo R WRC was officially unveiled in May 2011, and spent the next eighteen months in testing, with two-time World Rally Champion Carlos Sainz, Sébastien Ogier—who was recruited to the team from the Citroën World Rally Team at the end of the 2011 season—and Volkswagen's testing and development driver Dieter Depping carrying out development in Norway, Finland, Germany, Spain and Mexico to simulate the conditions the car would encounter in competition. The testing phase was not without incident; the team signed Ford's Jari-Matti Latvala in October 2012, but his first test in Mexico was cut short when he collided with a passenger car whilst travelling on public roads between stages. No-one was seriously injured in the crash, but the car was too damaged to continue testing. Further testing also took place in Provence-Alpes-Côte d'Azur to prepare the cars for the unique snow and tarmac roads used in the Monte Carlo Rally, the first event of the 2013 season.

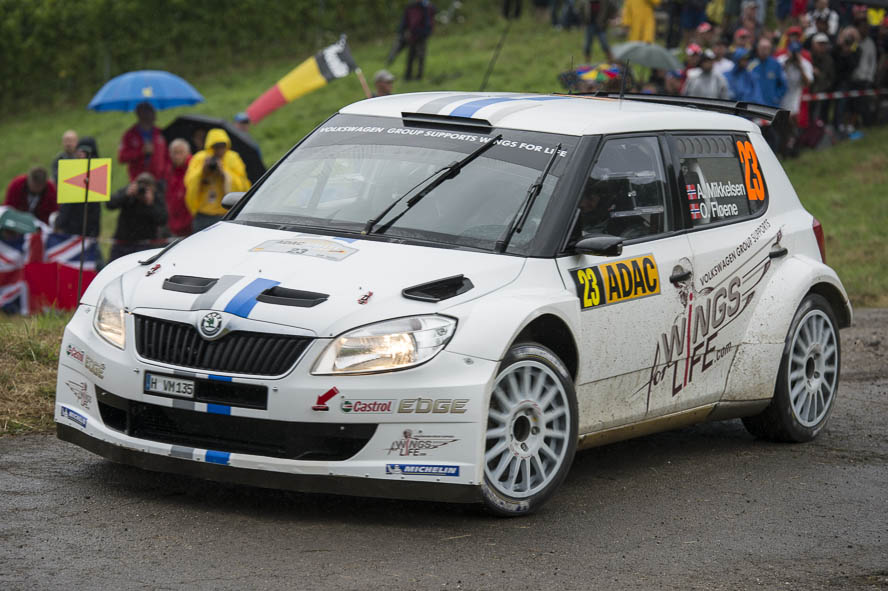
Volkswagen's preparations for their return began in 2012, entering a Škoda Fabia S2000 throughout the season to gain experience running a team.

The car was originally intended to make its debut at the 2012 Rally d'Italia in Sardegna, but these plans were abandoned in favour of continuing development, and the car was submitted to the FIA in November for homologation. Parallel to this, Volkswagen Motorsport entered two Škoda Fabias built to Super 2000 specifications in twelve rounds of the 2012 season—and a third car in the 2012 Rallye Deutschland—to develop experience in running a World Rally Championship team. As the team was not competing with a World Rally Car, they were ineligible for championship points. The final build of the Polo R WRC was formally launched in December 2012 in Monaco.

== Competition history ==
=== Début (2013) ===
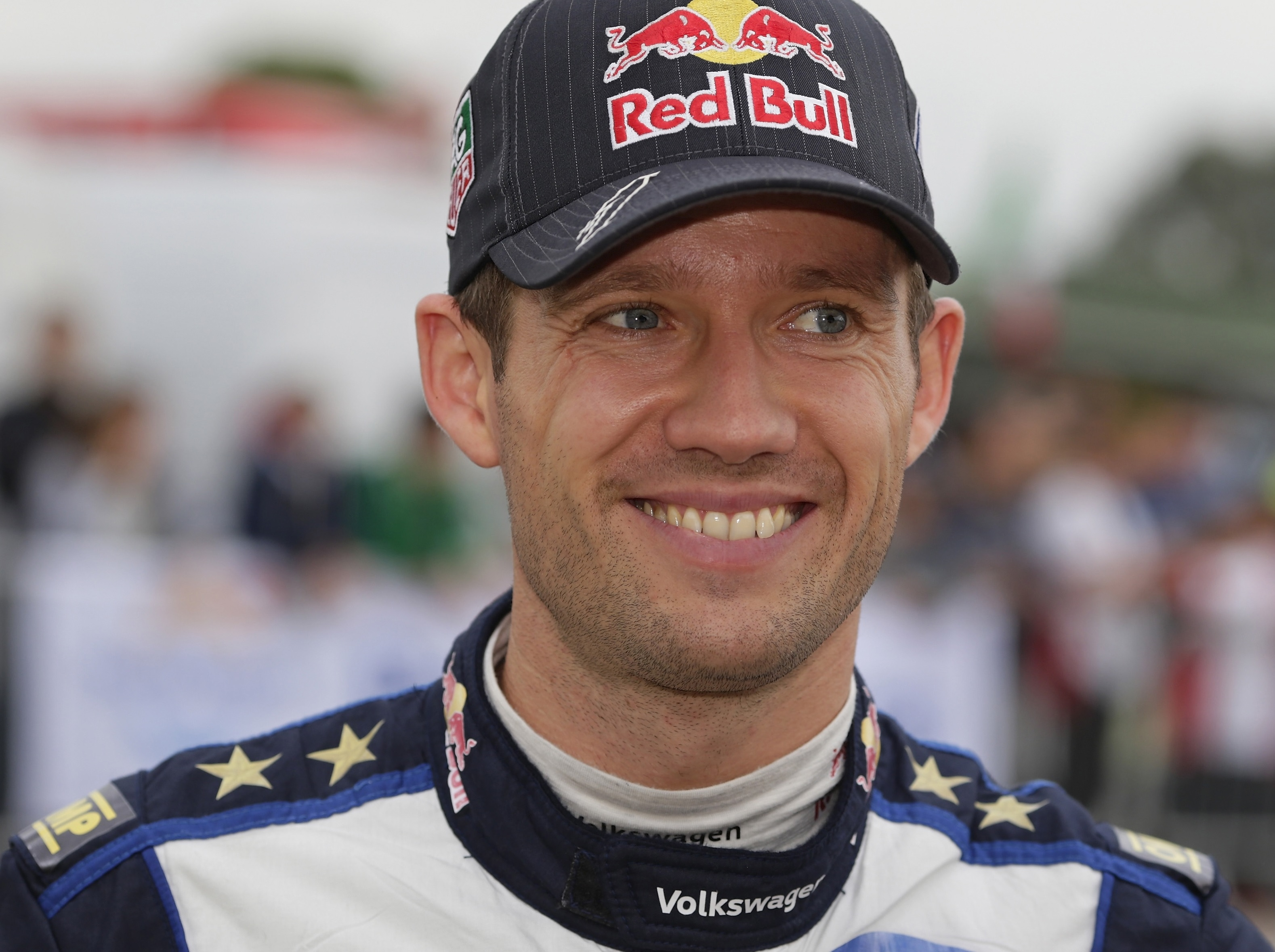
Sébastien Ogier was the first driver to join Volkswagen Motorsport.

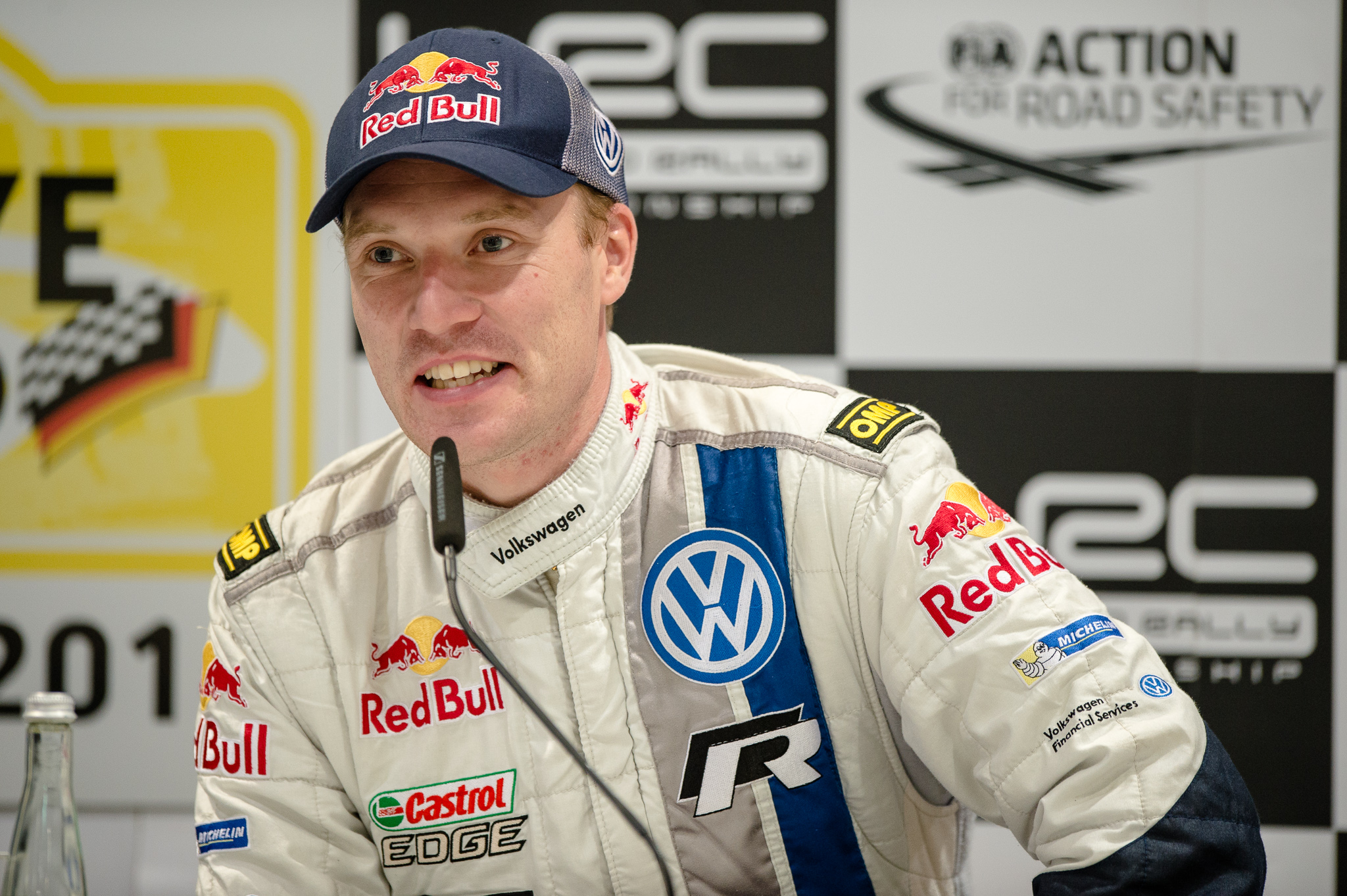
Jari-Matti Latvala left the Ford World Rally Team to drive for Volkswagen.

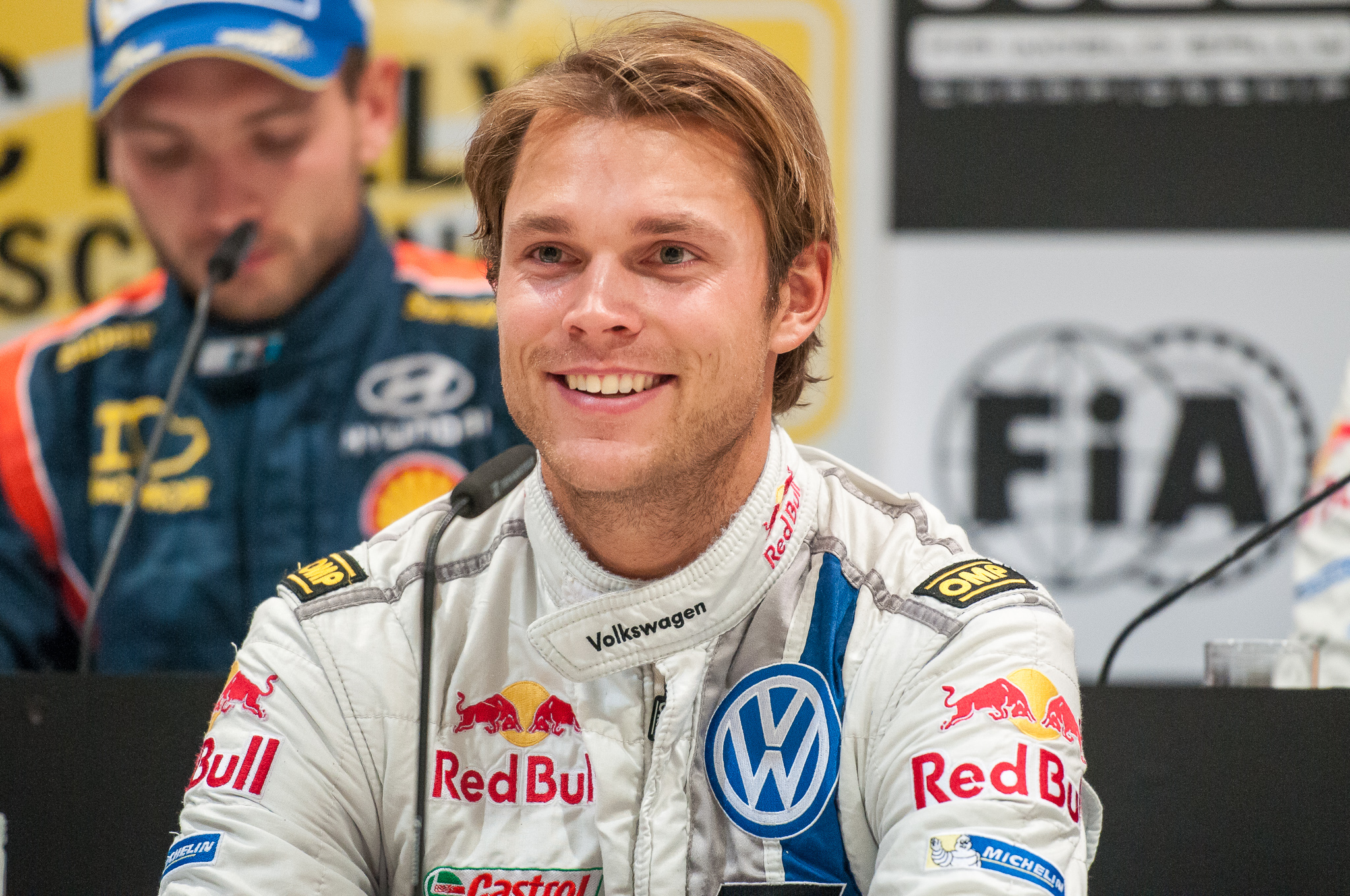
Andreas Mikkelsen was entered in a third Polo R WRC.

Two cars driven by Sébastien Ogier and Jari-Matti Latvala contested the full 2013 season of the World Rally Championship. Andreas Mikkelsen competed part-time throughout 2013 in a third car that was entered under the name "Volkswagen Motorsport II".

In its debut season, the car scored six wins in its first eight rallies. After finishing second on the Rallye Monte Carlo, Sébastien Ogier went on to win the rallies of Sweden, Mexico, and Portugal. Jari-Matti Latvala scored his first win for Volkswagen in Greece. Following concerns that the cost of moving to a new specification for the 2014 season would drive Ford and Citroën out of the category, Volkswagen successfully lobbied to keep the current car spec for another year. Ogier continued his winning streak with victories in the Rally d'Italia Sardegna, Rally Finland, and had the opportunity to secure the FIA World Rally Championship for Drivers at the Rally Deutschland. However, a mistake on the first leg forced him into retirement, and while he re-entered the following day under the Rally-2 regulations, doing so came with an automatic five-minute time penalty and Ogier finished seventeenth overall. Despite this, Ogier won the rally's power stage, and as a result, would go on to score points in every round of the championship.

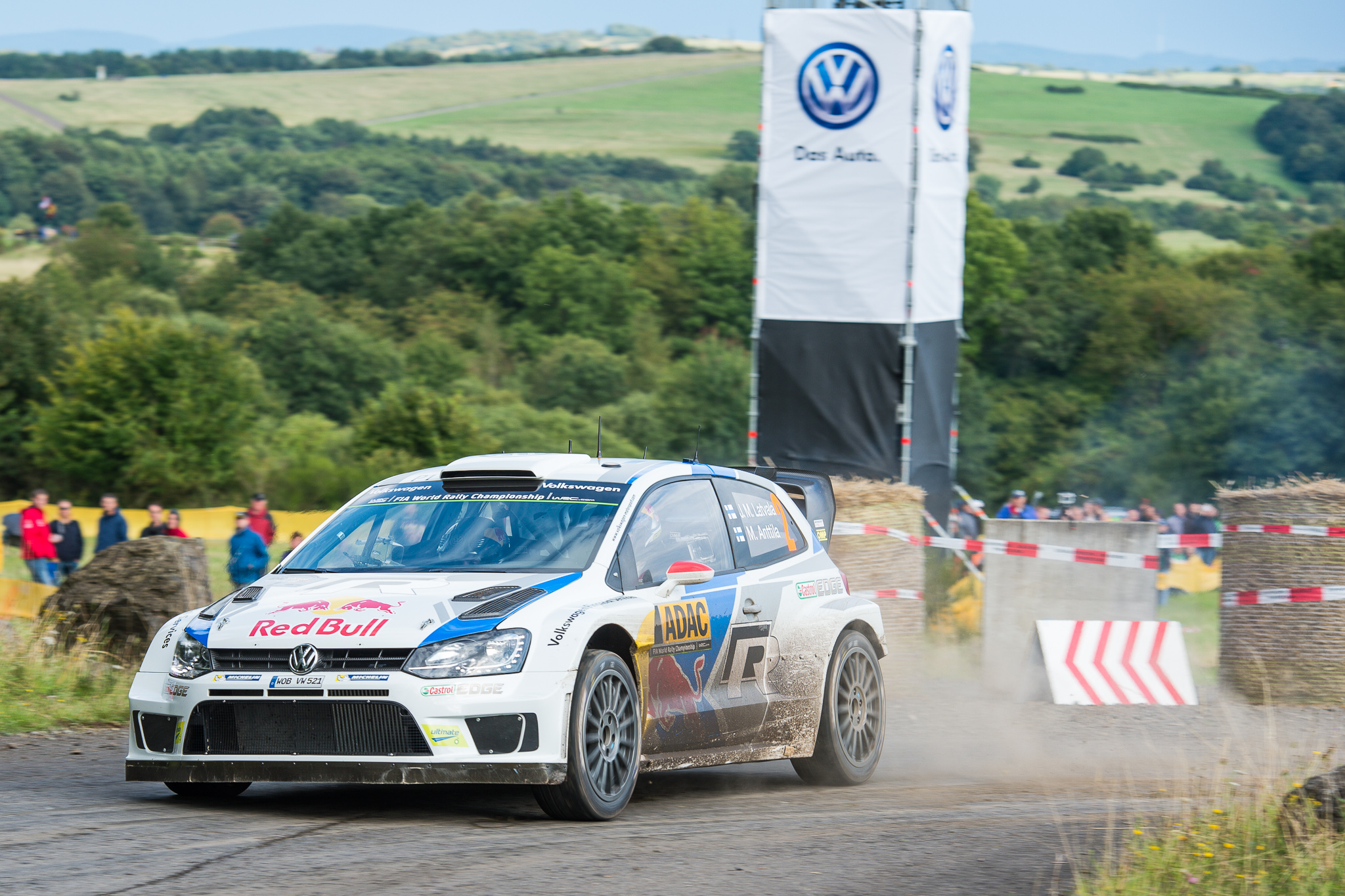
Despite regularly winning tarmac, snow and gravel events, the Polo R WRC struggled to win in its home event, the Rally of Germany.

Ogier had another opportunity to win the title in Australia, but Qatar World Rally Team driver Thierry Neuville—by this point, the only driver still in mathematical contention for the championship—finished the rally second overall, forcing the title fight to go unresolved until the next round in France. Ogier needed to out-score Neuville by just a single point to be declared the 2013 champion. He achieved this on the first stage of the rally, which in a break with tradition, was run as the event's power stage. Ogier went on to win the rally, and finished the season with two more wins in Spain, where a second-place finish for teammate Latvala was enough to secure the Manufacturers' title for Volkswagen, and Wales, where Latvala again finished second.

At the end of the season, the Polo R WRC had won ten of the thirteen rallies it entered, finished on the podium eight more times, and secured both the Drivers' and Manufacturers' championships at the first attempt. In doing so, Ogier and Volkswagen broke Sébastien Loeb and Citroën's streak of nine consecutive World Drivers' and Manufacturers' Championship titles respectively.

=== Title defence (2014) ===
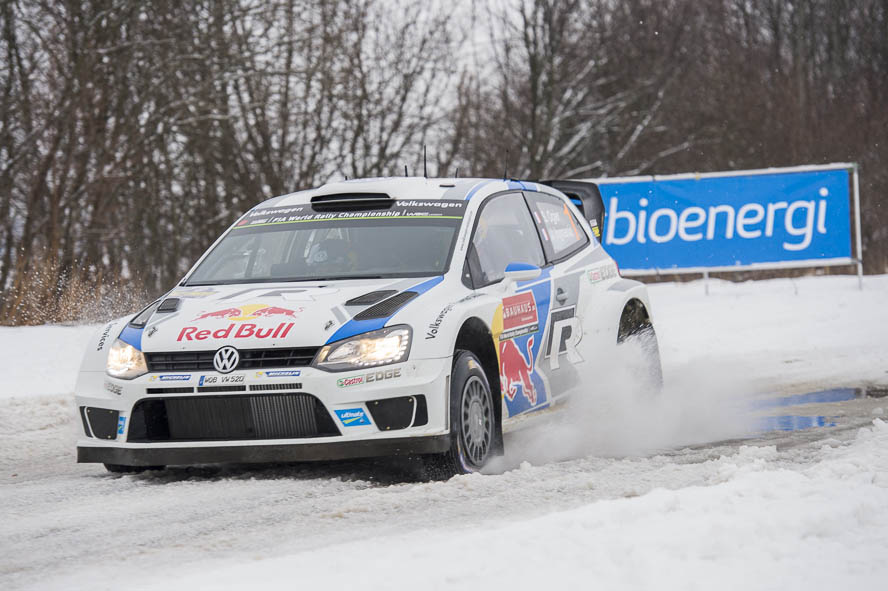
Sébastien Ogier and co-driver Julien Ingrassia at the 62nd Rally Sweden.

In anticipation of its title defence in 2014, development of the car continued through the 2013–2014 off-season, with the team introducing a series of performance updates to the car ahead of the 2014 Rallye Monte Carlo. Sébastien Ogier and Jari-Matti Latvala remained with the team, whilst Andreas Mikkelsen's programme was expanded to include all thirteen rounds of the championship, but the team did not nominate him to score manufacturer points in Australia.

The car's domination continued, winning the first six rallies of the season. Ogier overcame difficult conditions to win in Monte Carlo by over a minute, before going on to win in Mexico, Portugal, Italy, and Poland, while Jari-Matti Latvala claimed wins in Sweden, Argentina and Finland. Andreas Mikkelsen scored his first podium at the World Championship level in Sweden, followed by a second in Poland, and finishing in the points in every rally. Latvala's win in Argentina, the ninth consecutive win by the Polo R WRC, broke the previous record of eight consecutive rally victories set by the Citroën DS3 WRC in 2011.

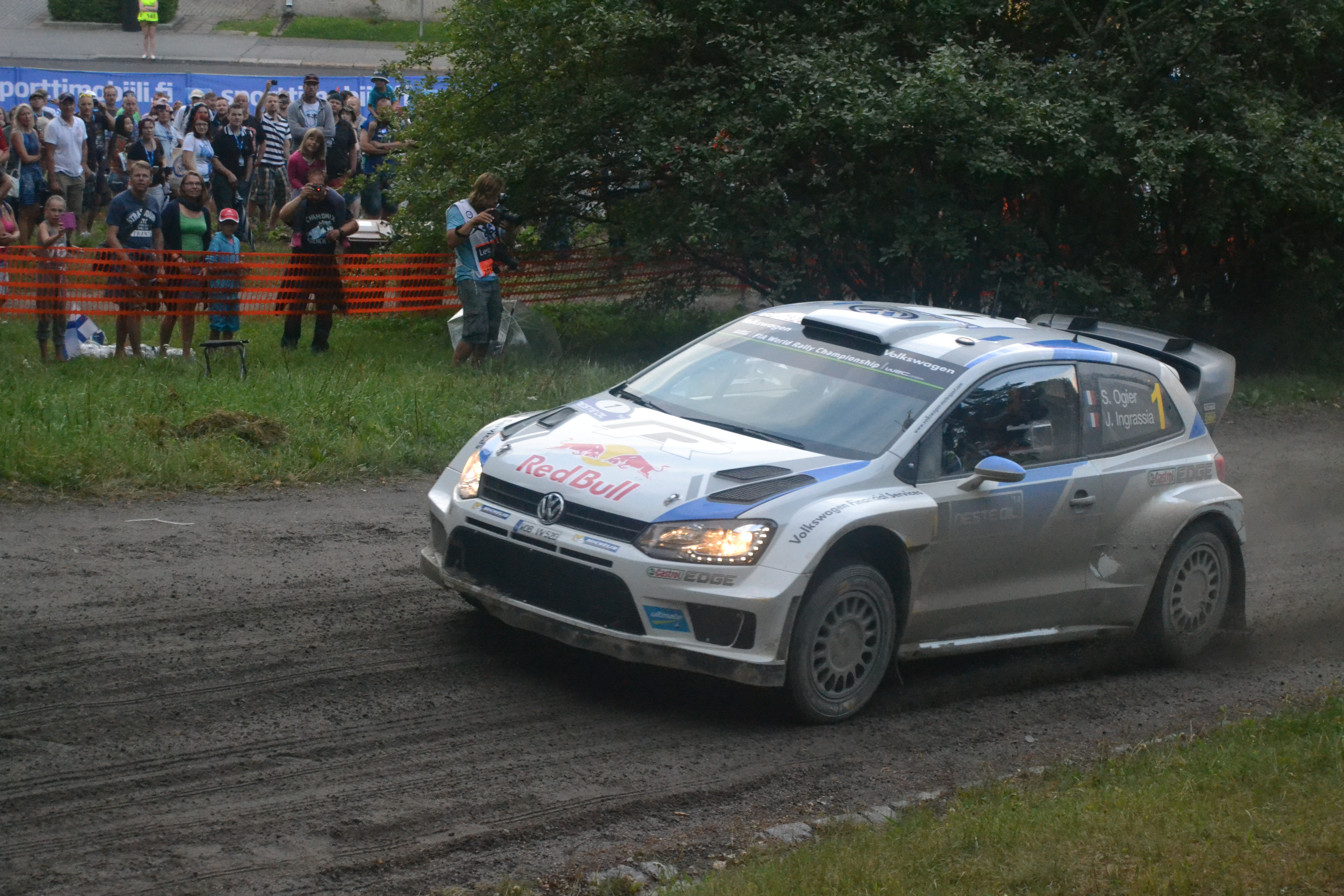
The Polo R WRC set a new record at the 64th Rally Finland, recording its twelfth consecutive win.

Ogier and Latvala had the opportunity to secure the 2014 World Championship for Manufacturers for Volkswagen in the Rally of Germany, but both of them crashed out of the event. With Mikkelsen finishing third overall—behind the Hyundai i20 WRCs of Thierry Neuville and Dani Sordo—the Polo R WRC's record-breaking run came to an end after twelve rounds. The team recovered to take a clean sweep of the podium in Australia, with Ogier winning ahead of Latvala to secure the manufacturers' title. Mikkelsen finished third overall, but was not registered to score manufacturer points.

Ogier had the opportunity to secure his second consecutive drivers' title in France, but lost nine minutes on the first day of the event with a faulty gear selector and a time penalty. Ogier was unable to recover and ultimately finished eleventh, allowing Latvala to take a full twenty-five points out of his championship lead with another win—the first of his career on tarmac—while Mikkelsen matched his career-best result of second place. Despite his problems in France, Ogier entered the penultimate round in Spain with a twenty-seven-point advantage over Latvala. Running first on the road, he was unhindered by thick dust that threatened to obscure the vision of his rivals, and he took a comfortable victory and his second consecutive World Championship. Latvala finished the event second and Mikkelsen seventh. With his second World Championship title secured, Ogier went on to win the Wales Rally GB. Latvala and Mikkelsen struggled throughout, with Latvala finishing eighth and Mikkelsen retiring.

=== Continued dominance (2015) ===
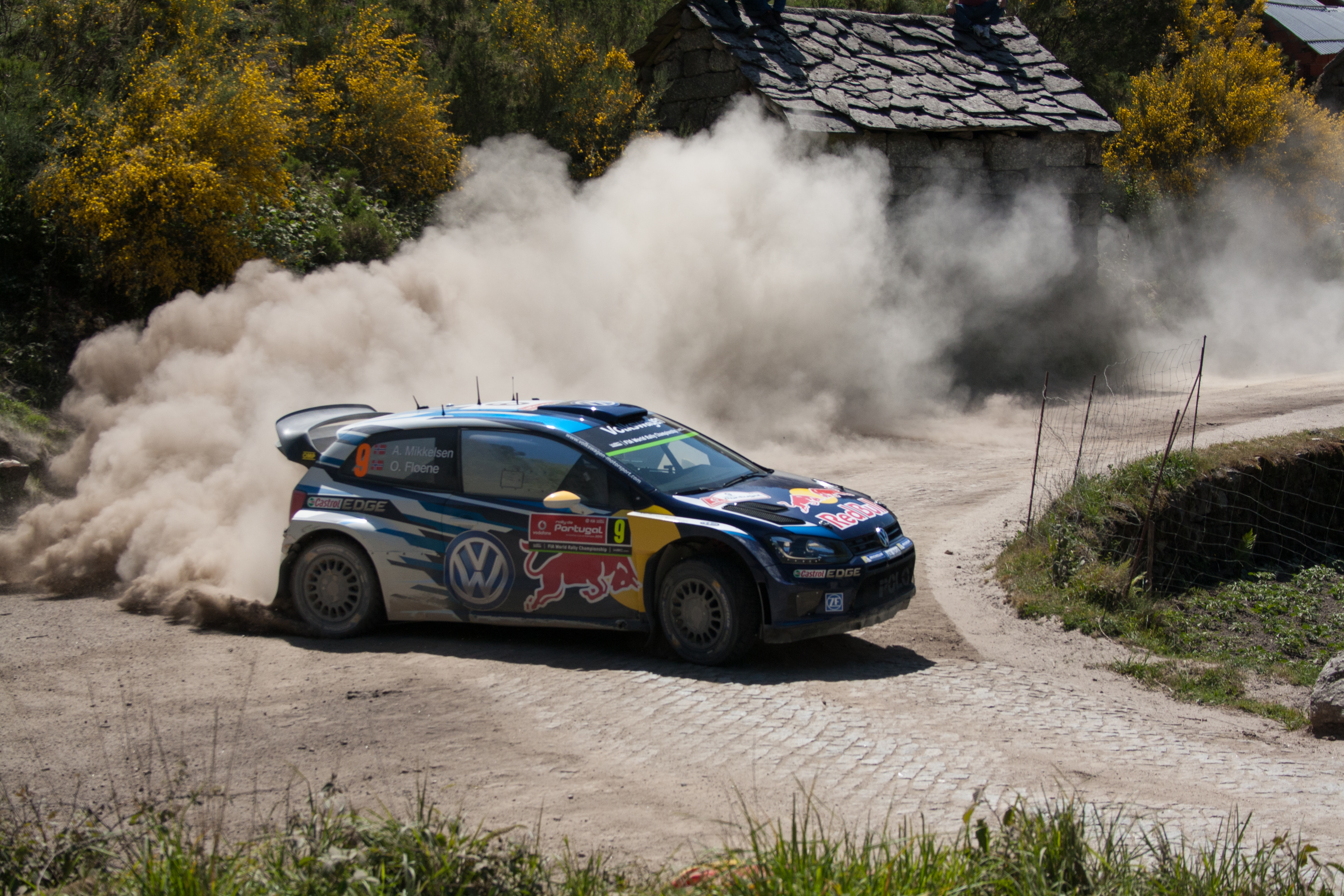
Andreas Mikkelsen and Ola Fløene driving an updated Polo R WRC at the 49º Rally de Portugal.

The second generation of the Polo R WRC was put into development in early 2014, in anticipation of a 2015 debut, with an ongoing development schedule planned to take the second generation car through to the next revision of the technical regulations in 2017. Two-time World Drivers' Champion Marcus Grönholm joined the team's expanded testing and development programme, while the team retained Ogier, Latvala and Mikkelsen as their drivers. The car was updated to include a brand-new gearbox and revised hydraulic system, a larger rear wing to generate more downforce, and substantial weight reduction, with over seventy-five percent of the car having been developed during the off-season. Ogier and Latvala contested the entire season with the updated Polo, while Mikkelsen started the season with a car built to 2014 specifications before switching to the 2015 build ahead of the Rally of Portugal.

Volkswagen Motorsport took a clean sweep of the podium positions in the season-opening Monte Carlo Rally. Ogier won after an early battle with nine-time World Champion Sébastien Loeb—whose one-off guest appearance in a Citroën DS3 WRC came to an abrupt end when he crashed out on the second leg of the event—and recorded another win in Sweden despite losing several minutes in a spin and having to reclaim the rally lead from Mikkelsen. Ogier recorded another victory in Mexico, with Mikkelsen again on the podium. Latvala scored a podium in Monte Carlo, but was forced to retire in Sweden and finished seventeenth in Mexico.

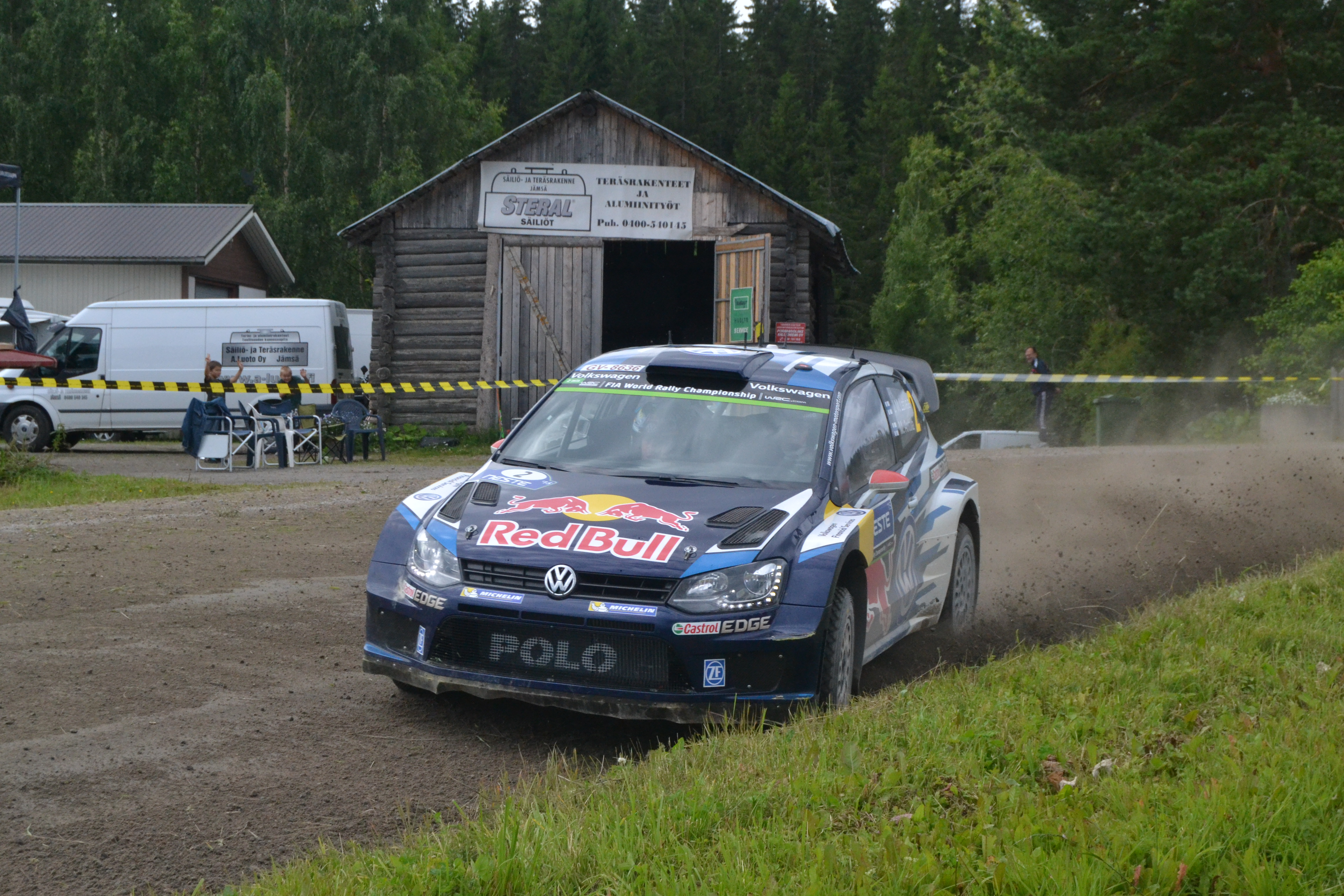
Jari-Matti Latvala and Miikka Anttila set a new record for the fastest rally in the sport's history at the 65th Rally Finland.

After enduring a difficult Rally Argentina that saw Ogier finish outside the points and both Latvala and Mikkelsen retire, Volkswagen recovered to take a clean sweep of the podium in Portugal, led by Ogier. Ogier continued his form, winning the next two events in Italy and Poland, but faced stiff competition from Hyundai's Hayden Paddon and M-Sport driver Ott Tänak. After writing his 2015 title bid off following the Rally Poland, Latvala took his second win of the season in Finland—his third on the event, matching compatriot Juha Kankkunen's record—ahead of Ogier while Mikkelsen retired. In doing so, Latvala set a new record for the fastest rally in the sport's history, averaging 125.44 km/h (77.94 mph) over the event; by comparison, the previous record set by Sébastien Loeb during the 2012 running of the event was 122.89 km/h (76.36 mph). The team secured its third one-two-three finish of the season at the next round in Germany, finally winning its home event on the third attempt, and in doing so, recorded at least one win at each individual event on the calendar. Ogier went on to win his third consecutive drivers' title at the next round in Australia, leading home Latvala and Kris Meeke, with Mikkelsen in fourth.

The championship returned to Corsica for the first time in seven years where the teams endured difficult conditions that saw several stages cancelled. Ogier suffered a gearbox problem that forced him to retire from the first leg of the rally while Latvala had to catch Elfyn Evans to secure victory. Mikkelsen was third, having recovered from early difficulties of his own, while Ogier finished seventeenth overall, and the tenth driver eligible to score manufacturer points. Mikkelsen went on to take his maiden WRC victory in Spain when Sébastien Ogier crashed on the final stage, promoting Latvala to second in the process. Ogier finished the year with his eighth win of the season in Wales, with Mikkelsen in third. Latvala crashed out on the opening leg of the rally and after restarting the next day, went on to finish fiftieth overall and was classified as the final driver (9th) eligible to score manufacturer points. Volkswagen Motorsport finished the season with twelve wins (including Mikkelsen's one) from thirteen rallies. Volkswagen Motorsport won with 183 points in front of Citroën WRT, while sister team Volkswagen Motorsport II was classified fifth in the final standings.

=== Final season (2016) ===
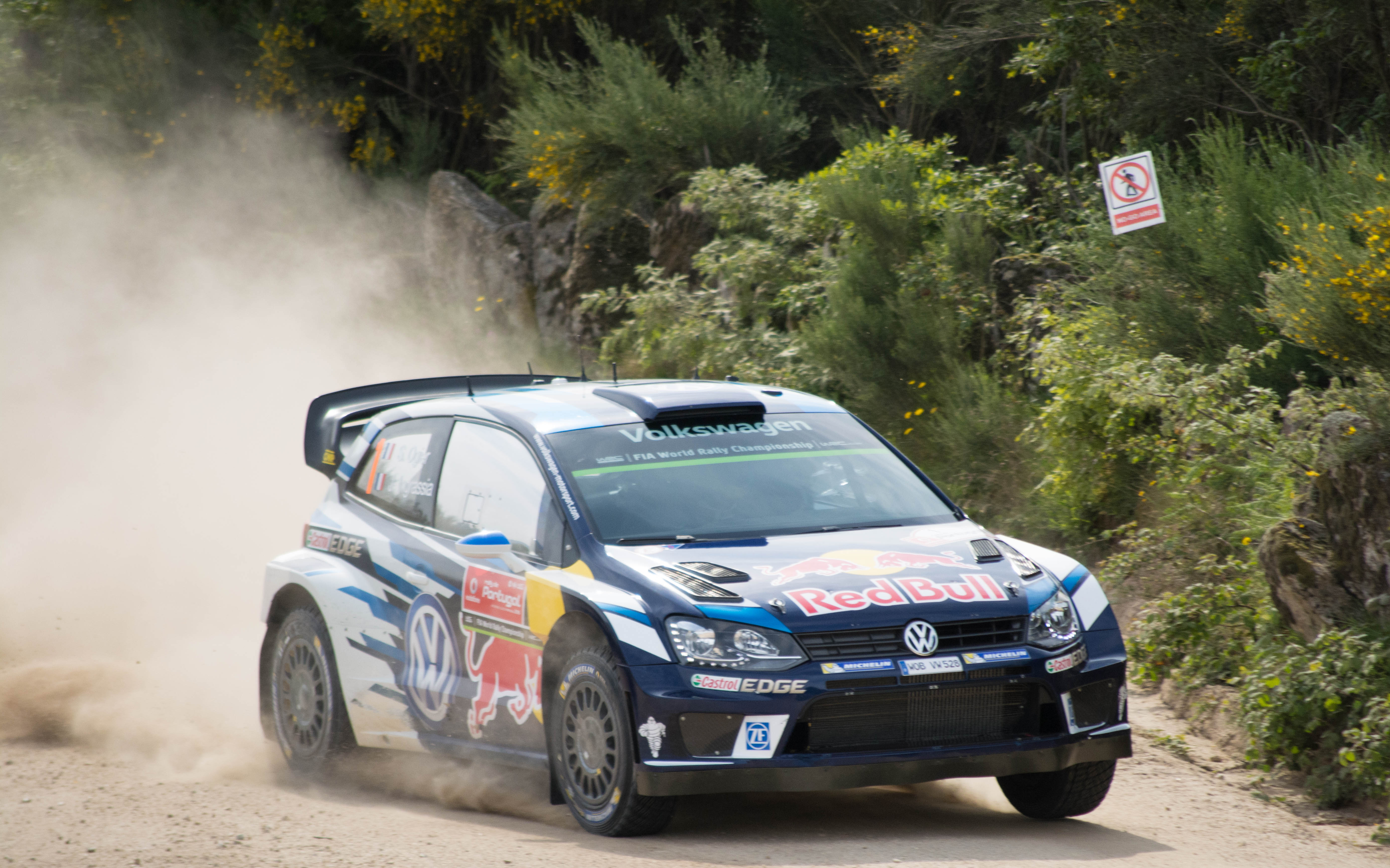
Sébastien Ogier and Julien Ingrassia during 2016 Rally de Portugal.

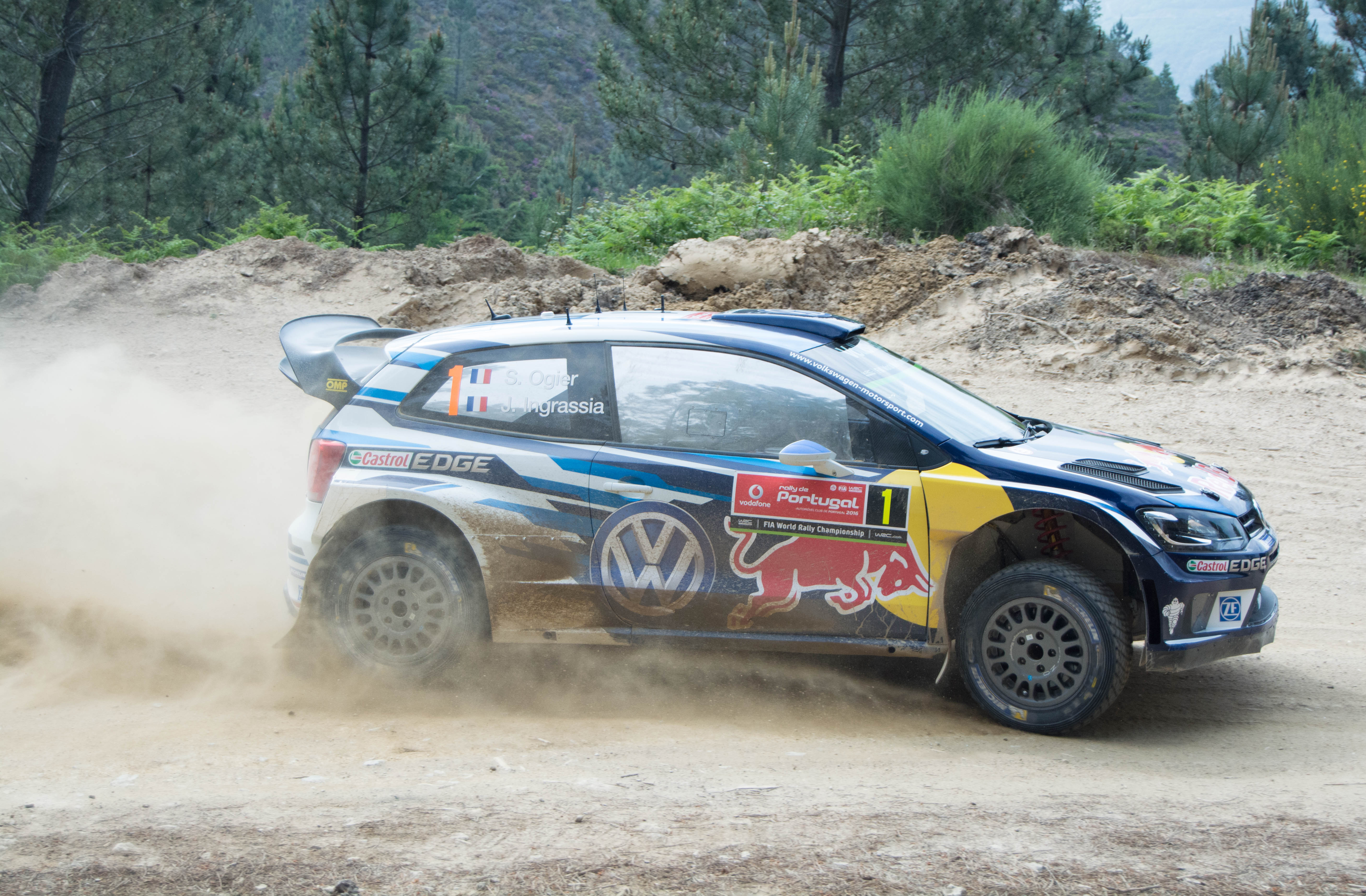
Another picture of Ogier and co-driver Ingrassia at the 50º Rally de Portugal.

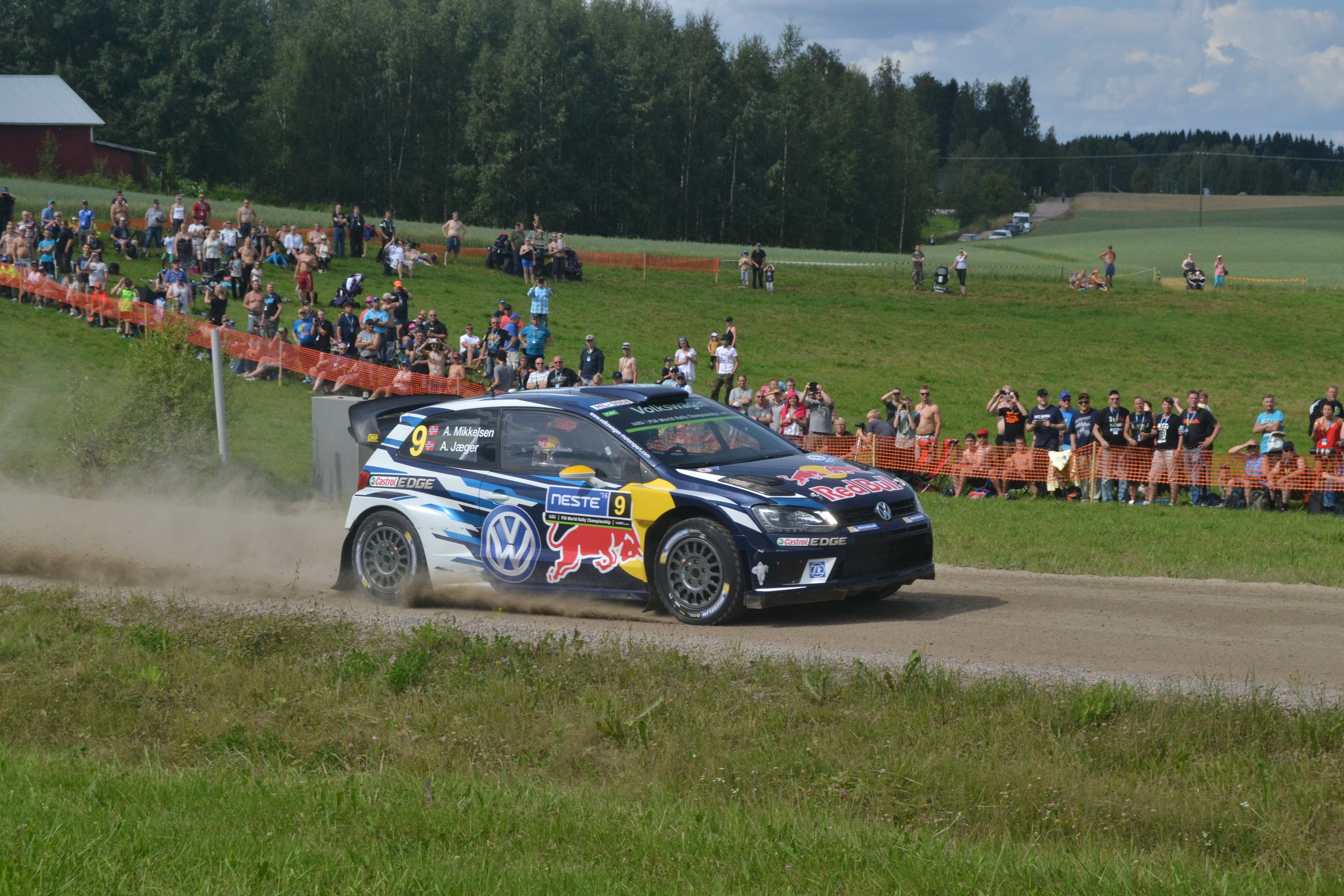
Andreas Mikkelsen and Anders Jæger took two rally wins in 2016.

Despite having made only minor changes to the car during the winter off-season, and faced with the imminent departure of team principal Jost Capito to Formula One team McLaren, Volkswagen Motorsport continued to dominate the 2016 season. Ogier won the opening two rounds in Monte Carlo and Sweden despite difficult conditions that saw several stages of the Rally Sweden route cancelled as rising temperatures saw the roads thaw out, making the studded snow tyres unusable. Latvala, however, endured a string of mechanical failures and driver errors that saw him fail to score a single point in the opening rounds. He took advantage of his road position to win Rally Mexico while Ogier finished second despite having been first on the road and sweeping loose gravel off the surface. Andreas Mikkelsen remained in the third Polo R, but changed his co-driver for the season, enlisting Anders Jæger as Ola Fløene joined Mads Østberg at M-Sport. Mikkelsen and Jæger started their season with a podium in Monte Carlo and a points finish in Sweden before retiring in Mexico.

Despite his victory in Mexico, Latvala's resurgence was short-lived as he crashed out of the lead of the next rally in Argentina when his suspension failed at high speed. His accident promoted Ogier to second and Mikkelsen to third behind Hyundai's Hayden Paddon. Latvala rejoined the rally for the final day and was classified sixteenth overall, and the ninth driver eligible to score manufacturer points. The next round in Portugal saw all three Volkswagens struggle with their setup and allow Kris Meeke to establish an early lead. Meeke went on to win the rally ahead of Mikkelsen and Ogier; however, as Meeke was not nominated to score manufacturer points, Mikkelsen and Volkswagen Motorsport II received the full twenty-five points for first place.

The Volkswagens struggled to match the pace of Hyundai's Thierry Neuville in Sardegna, where the loose surface meant that the drivers lost time road-sweeping, clearing away the top layer of the roads and allowing faster cars a cleaner line to follow. Despite this, Latvala and Ogier finished second and third behind Neuville, with Mikkelsen classified thirteenth overall after suffer mechanical issues on the final day, and received points as the eighth manufacturer car to finish. Although the event marked the third consecutive rally that had not been won by a Volkswagen, the team nevertheless retained their lead in the World Championship for Manufacturers. Mikkelsen ended the car's winless streak in Poland after taking the lead from Ott Tänak late in the rally. Latvala was unable to develop a consistent rhythm and finished fifth, while Ogier once struggled with sweeping the loose, sandy surface of the roads, and went on to finish sixth.

Latvala spearheaded the team at the next round in Finland, finishing second behind Meeke. Mikkelsen was classified seventh while Ogier was twenty-fourth overall after spinning into a ditch and losing sixteen minutes on the first day. Ogier claimed his first win since the Rally of Sweden at the next round in Germany, finishing ahead of the Hyundais of Dani Sordo and Thierry Neuville, with Mikkelsen fourth. Latvala endured a difficult rally, suffering from a terminal gearbox fault on the first stage that forced him to retire from the leg and rejoin the next day, and he went on to be classified forty-eighth over all The championship went into an extended hiatus with the cancellation of Rally China, with Volkswagen appointing Sven Smeets—former co-driver to Freddy Loix and François Duval—to replace the departing Capito ahead of the next round in Corsica.

Ogier secured another victory in Corsica, with Hyundai's Thierry Neuville finishing second ahead of Mikkelsen and Latvala in third and fourth. As the championship returned to Catalunya, Ogier and Mikkelsen remained the only drivers in mathematical contention to win the drivers' title. Mikkelsen crashed chasing rally leader Dani Sordo, leaving Ogier needing only to finish in the top two to be champion. Ogier caught Sordo at the end of the second leg of the rally and went on to win both the event and his fourth consecutive World Drivers' Championship. In doing so, Ogier became only the fourth driver—after Juha Kankkunen, Tommi Mäkinen and Sébastien Loeb—to win four championships.

The team entered the penultimate round in Great Britain with an opportunity to secure the manufacturers' championship; Hyundai, the only other team still in mathematical contention, would need to out-score Volkswagen by twenty points to take the championship to the final round in Australia. All three cars were beset by driveshaft problems on the first day of competition, effectively taking Latvala and Mikkelsen out of contention; Ogier had similar problems, but they struck late in the day, and he was largely unaffected. Ogier held off Ott Tänak to secure victory, and with it, Volkswagen's fourth manufacturer title. The final round of the season took place in Australia and saw Mikkelsen claim his third rally win ahead of Ogier and Thierry Neuville, while Latvala finished ninth overall after clipping a guardrail on the opening stage and breaking his suspension.

=== Project cancellation ===
With the sport undergoing an overhaul of the technical regulations for the 2017 season, Volkswagen developed the 2017-specification Polo WRC throughout the 2016 season, with the development phase once again carried out by Marcus Grönholm. The car, which officially became known as the Volkswagen Polo GTI WRC, was designed with a larger turbo restrictor, saw increases in the overhang of the front and rear bumpers, as well as larger door sills and a larger rear wing. The overall width of the car was increased, while 25 kg (55.1 lb) was cut from the body shell, and a centre differential was added for the first time. Despite extensive testing, the company formally cancelled the development of the car in November 2016 with their withdrawal from the sport. The cancellation was a result of the Volkswagen emissions scandal. Volkswagen later announced plans to maintain a presence in the sport, adopting a customer-oriented approach by developing a Polo rally car built to Group R5 specifications.

=== Post-WRC career ===
Although the Polo R WRC was retired from the World Rally Championship at the end of the 2016 season, Volkswagen made the car available to privateer entries on a limited basis starting in 2017. Raimund Baumschlager became the first privateer to enter a Polo R WRC, contesting rounds of the Austrian national championship.

Some of the chassis built in 2013 and 2014 were rebuilt and used by the factory-supported PSRX Volkswagen Sweden team in the FIA World Rallycross Championship; Petter Solberg's 2018 car was first used by Sébastien Ogier at the 2013 Rally Catalunya.

== Complete World Rally Championship results ==
=== WRC championship titles ===
Year	Title	Competitor	Entries	Wins	Podiums	Points
2013	FIA World Rally Championship for Drivers	(France) Sébastien Ogier	13	9	2	290
2013	FIA World Rally Championship for Co-Drivers	(France) Julien Ingrassia	13	9	2	290
2013	FIA World Rally Championship for Manufacturers	(Germany) Volkswagen Motorsport	26	10	8	425
2014	FIA World Rally Championship for Drivers	(France) Sébastien Ogier	13	8	2	267
2014	FIA World Rally Championship for Co-Drivers	(France) Julien Ingrassia	13	8	2	267
2014	FIA World Rally Championship for Manufacturers	(Germany) Volkswagen Motorsport	26	12	6	447
2015	FIA World Rally Championship for Drivers	(France) Sébastien Ogier	13	8	2	253
2015	FIA World Rally Championship for Co-Drivers	(France) Julien Ingrassia	13	8	2	253
2015	FIA World Rally Championship for Manufacturers	(Germany) Volkswagen Motorsport	26	11	6	413
2016	FIA World Rally Championship for Drivers	(France) Sébastien Ogier	14	6	5	268
2016	FIA World Rally Championship for Co-Drivers	(France) Julien Ingrassia	14	6	5	268
2016	FIA World Rally Championship for Manufacturers	(Germany) Volkswagen Motorsport	28	8	6	355

=== WRC victories ===
Year	No.	Event	Surface	Driver	Co-driver	Entrant
2013	1	Rally Sweden	Snow	(France) Sébastien Ogier	(France) Julien Ingrassia	(Germany) Volkswagen Motorsport
2013	2	(Mexico) Rally Guanajuato México	Gravel	(France) Sébastien Ogier	(France) Julien Ingrassia	(Germany) Volkswagen Motorsport
2013	3	Rally de Portugal	Gravel	(France) Sébastien Ogier	(France) Julien Ingrassia	(Germany) Volkswagen Motorsport
2013	4	(Greece) Acropolis Rally	Gravel	(Finland) Jari-Matti Latvala	(Finland) Miikka Anttila	(Germany) Volkswagen Motorsport
2013	5	(Italy) Rally Italia Sardegna	Gravel	(France) Sébastien Ogier	(France) Julien Ingrassia	(Germany) Volkswagen Motorsport
2013	6	Rally Finland	Gravel	(France) Sébastien Ogier	(France) Julien Ingrassia	(Germany) Volkswagen Motorsport
2013	7	Rally Australia	Gravel	(France) Sébastien Ogier	(France) Julien Ingrassia	(Germany) Volkswagen Motorsport
2013	8	Rallye de France-Alsace	Tarmac	(France) Sébastien Ogier	(France) Julien Ingrassia	(Germany) Volkswagen Motorsport
2013	9	(Spain) RACC Rally Catalunya de España	Mixed	(France) Sébastien Ogier	(France) Julien Ingrassia	(Germany) Volkswagen Motorsport
2013	10	(United Kingdom) Wales Rally GB	Gravel	(France) Sébastien Ogier	(France) Julien Ingrassia	(Germany) Volkswagen Motorsport
2014	11	(Monaco) Rallye Automobile Monte Carlo	Mixed	(France) Sébastien Ogier	(France) Julien Ingrassia	(Germany) Volkswagen Motorsport
2014	12	Rally Sweden	Snow	(Finland) Jari-Matti Latvala	(Finland) Miikka Anttila	(Germany) Volkswagen Motorsport
2014	13	(Mexico) Rally Guanajuato México	Gravel	(France) Sébastien Ogier	(France) Julien Ingrassia	(Germany) Volkswagen Motorsport
2014	14	Rally de Portugal	Gravel	(France) Sébastien Ogier	(France) Julien Ingrassia	(Germany) Volkswagen Motorsport
2014	15	Rally Argentina	Gravel	(Finland) Jari-Matti Latvala	(Finland) Miikka Anttila	(Germany) Volkswagen Motorsport
2014	16	(Italy) Rally Italia Sardegna	Gravel	(France) Sébastien Ogier	(France) Julien Ingrassia	(Germany) Volkswagen Motorsport
2014	17	Rally Poland	Gravel	(France) Sébastien Ogier	(France) Julien Ingrassia	(Germany) Volkswagen Motorsport
2014	18	Rally Finland	Gravel	(Finland) Jari-Matti Latvala	(Finland) Miikka Anttila	(Germany) Volkswagen Motorsport
2014	19	Rally Australia	Gravel	(France) Sébastien Ogier	(France) Julien Ingrassia	(Germany) Volkswagen Motorsport
2014	20	Rallye de France-Alsace	Tarmac	(Finland) Jari-Matti Latvala	(Finland) Miikka Anttila	(Germany) Volkswagen Motorsport
2014	21	(Spain) RACC Rally Catalunya de España	Mixed	(France) Sébastien Ogier	(France) Julien Ingrassia	(Germany) Volkswagen Motorsport
2014	22	(United Kingdom) Wales Rally GB	Gravel	(France) Sébastien Ogier	(France) Julien Ingrassia	(Germany) Volkswagen Motorsport
2015	23	(Monaco) Rallye Automobile Monte Carlo	Mixed	(France) Sébastien Ogier	(France) Julien Ingrassia	(Germany) Volkswagen Motorsport
2015	24	Rally Sweden	Snow	(France) Sébastien Ogier	(France) Julien Ingrassia	(Germany) Volkswagen Motorsport
2015	25	(Mexico) Rally Guanajuato México	Gravel	(France) Sébastien Ogier	(France) Julien Ingrassia	(Germany) Volkswagen Motorsport
2015	26	Rally de Portugal	Gravel	(Finland) Jari-Matti Latvala	(Finland) Miikka Anttila	(Germany) Volkswagen Motorsport
2015	27	(Italy) Rally Italia Sardegna	Gravel	(France) Sébastien Ogier	(France) Julien Ingrassia	(Germany) Volkswagen Motorsport
2015	28	Rally Poland	Gravel	(France) Sébastien Ogier	(France) Julien Ingrassia	(Germany) Volkswagen Motorsport
2015	29	Rally Finland	Gravel	(Finland) Jari-Matti Latvala	(Finland) Miikka Anttila	(Germany) Volkswagen Motorsport
2015	30	(Germany) ADAC Rallye Deutschland	Tarmac	(France) Sébastien Ogier	(France) Julien Ingrassia	(Germany) Volkswagen Motorsport
2015	31	Rally Australia	Gravel	(France) Sébastien Ogier	(France) Julien Ingrassia	(Germany) Volkswagen Motorsport
2015	32	(France) Tour de Corse	Tarmac	(Finland) Jari-Matti Latvala	(Finland) Miikka Anttila	(Germany) Volkswagen Motorsport
2015	33	(Spain) RACC Rally Catalunya de España	Mixed	(Norway) Andreas Mikkelsen	(Norway) Ola Fløene	(Germany) Volkswagen Motorsport II
2015	34	(United Kingdom) Wales Rally GB	Gravel	(France) Sébastien Ogier	(France) Julien Ingrassia	(Germany) Volkswagen Motorsport
2016	35	(Monaco) Rallye Automobile Monte Carlo	Mixed	(France) Sébastien Ogier	(France) Julien Ingrassia	(Germany) Volkswagen Motorsport
2016	36	Rally Sweden	Snow	(France) Sébastien Ogier	(France) Julien Ingrassia	(Germany) Volkswagen Motorsport
2016	37	(Mexico) Rally Guanajuato México	Gravel	(Finland) Jari-Matti Latvala	(Finland) Miikka Anttila	(Germany) Volkswagen Motorsport
2016	38	Rally Poland	Gravel	(Norway) Andreas Mikkelsen	(Norway) Anders Jæger	(Germany) Volkswagen Motorsport II
2016	39	(Germany) ADAC Rallye Deutschland	Tarmac	(France) Sébastien Ogier	(France) Julien Ingrassia	(Germany) Volkswagen Motorsport
2016	40	(France) Tour de Corse	Tarmac	(France) Sébastien Ogier	(France) Julien Ingrassia	(Germany) Volkswagen Motorsport
2016	41	(Spain) RACC Rally Catalunya de España	Mixed	(France) Sébastien Ogier	(France) Julien Ingrassia	(Germany) Volkswagen Motorsport
2016	42	(United Kingdom) Wales Rally GB	Gravel	(France) Sébastien Ogier	(France) Julien Ingrassia	(Germany) Volkswagen Motorsport
2016	43	Rally Australia	Gravel	(Norway) Andreas Mikkelsen	(Norway) Anders Jæger	(Germany) Volkswagen Motorsport II

=== In detail ===
(key)

Year	Entrant	Driver	Co-driver	Rounds														Points	WCM pos.
Year	Entrant	Driver	Co-driver	1	2	3	4	5	6	7	8	9	10	11	12	13	14	Points	WCM pos.
2013	(Germany) Volkswagen Motorsport	(Finland) Jari-Matti Latvala	(Finland) Miikka Anttila	MCO; Ret	SWE; 4	MEX; 10	PRT; 3	ARG; 3	GRE; 1	ITA; 3	FIN; 7	DEU; 5	AUS; 4	FRA; 3	ESP; 2	GBR; 2		425	1st
2013	(Germany) Volkswagen Motorsport	(France) Sébastien Ogier	(France) Julien Ingrassia	MCO; 2	SWE; 1	MEX; 1	PRT; 1	ARG; 2	GRE; 10	ITA; 1	FIN; 1	DEU; 10	AUS; 1	FRA; 1	ESP; 1	GBR; 1		425	1st
2013	(Germany) Volkswagen Motorsport II	(Norway) Andreas Mikkelsen	(Finland) Mikko Markkula	MCO	SWE	MEX	PRT; 5	ARG; 8	GRE; 4	ITA; Ret	FIN; NC^{‡}	DEU; WD			ESP; Ret	GBR; 5		50	7th
2013	(Germany) Volkswagen Motorsport II	(Norway) Andreas Mikkelsen	(Republic of Ireland) Paul Nagle										AUS; 6	FRA; 7				50	7th
2014	(Germany) Volkswagen Motorsport	(Finland) Jari-Matti Latvala	(Finland) Miikka Anttila	MCO; 4	SWE; 1	MEX; 2	PRT; 8	ARG; 1	ITA; 3	POL; 5	FIN; 1	DEU; Ret	AUS; 2	FRA; 1	ESP; 2	GBR; 7		447	1st
2014	(Germany) Volkswagen Motorsport	(France) Sébastien Ogier	(France) Julien Ingrassia	MCO; 1	SWE; 5	MEX; 1	PRT; 1	ARG; 2	ITA; 1	POL; 1	FIN; 2	DEU; Ret	AUS; 1	FRA; 11	ESP; 1	GBR; 1		447	1st
2014	(Germany) Volkswagen Motorsport II	(Norway) Andreas Mikkelsen	(Finland) Mikko Markkula	MCO; 6	SWE; 2	MEX; 9	PRT; 4	ARG; 4										133	5th
2014	(Germany) Volkswagen Motorsport II	(Norway) Andreas Mikkelsen	(Norway) Ola Fløene						ITA; 4	POL; 2	FIN; 4	DEU; 3	AUS; NC^{‡}	FRA; 2	ESP; 7	GBR; Ret		133	5th
2015	(Germany) Volkswagen Motorsport	(Finland) Jari-Matti Latvala	(Finland) Miikka Anttila	MCO; 2	SWE; Ret	MEX; 7	ARG; Ret	PRT; 1	ITA; 6	POL; 5	FIN; 1	DEU; 2	AUS; 2	FRA; 1	ESP; 2	GBR; 10		413	1st
2015	(Germany) Volkswagen Motorsport	(France) Sébastien Ogier	(France) Julien Ingrassia	MCO; 1	SWE; 1	MEX; 1	ARG; 8	PRT; 2	ITA; 1	POL; 1	FIN; 2	DEU; 1	AUS; 1	FRA; 10	ESP; Ret	GBR; 1		413	1st
2015	(Germany) Volkswagen Motorsport II	(Norway) Andreas Mikkelsen	(Norway) Ola Fløene	MCO; NC^{‡}	SWE; 3	MEX; NC^{‡}	ARG; Ret	PRT; 3	ITA; 10	POL; 2	FIN; Ret	DEU; 3	AUS; 4	FRA; 3	ESP; 1	GBR; 3		131	5th
2016	(Germany) Volkswagen Motorsport	(Finland) Jari-Matti Latvala	(Finland) Miikka Anttila	MCO; Ret	SWE; 8	MEX; 1	ARG; 9	PRT; 5	ITA; 2	POL; 5	FIN; 1	DEU; 8	CHN; C	FRA; 4	ESP; 8	GBR; 6	AUS; 8	355	1st
2016	(Germany) Volkswagen Motorsport	(France) Sébastien Ogier	(France) Julien Ingrassia	MCO; 1	SWE; 1	MEX; 2	ARG; 2	PRT; 2	ITA; 3	POL; 6	FIN; 7	DEU; 1	CHN; C	FRA; 1	ESP; 1	GBR; 1	AUS; 2	355	1st
2016	(Germany) Volkswagen Motorsport II	(Norway) Andreas Mikkelsen	(Norway) Anders Jæger	MCO; 2	SWE; 4	MEX; Ret	ARG; 3	PRT; 1	ITA; 8	POL; 1	FIN; 5	DEU; 4	CHN; C	FRA; 3	ESP; Ret	GBR; 9	AUS; 1	163	3rd

Notes:

- ‡ — Team ineligible to score manufacturer points.

== See also ==
- Volkswagen Motorsport
- World Rally Car
  - Citroën DS3 WRC
  - Citroën C3 WRC
  - Ford Fiesta RS WRC
  - Ford Fiesta WRC
  - Hyundai i20 WRC
  - Hyundai i20 Coupe WRC
  - Mini John Cooper Works WRC
  - Toyota Yaris WRC
- Group R
  - Volkswagen Polo GTI R5
- Super 2000
  - Škoda Fabia S2000

Awards
Preceded by Peugeot 208 T16 Pikes Peak	Autosport Awards; Rally Car of the Year; 2014–2016	Succeeded by Ford Fiesta WRC
