= 2014 Rally Australia =

Motor rally competition

2014 Coates Hire Rally Australia 23rd Rally Australia
Round 10 of the 2014 World Rally Championship season
| ← Previous event | Next event → |
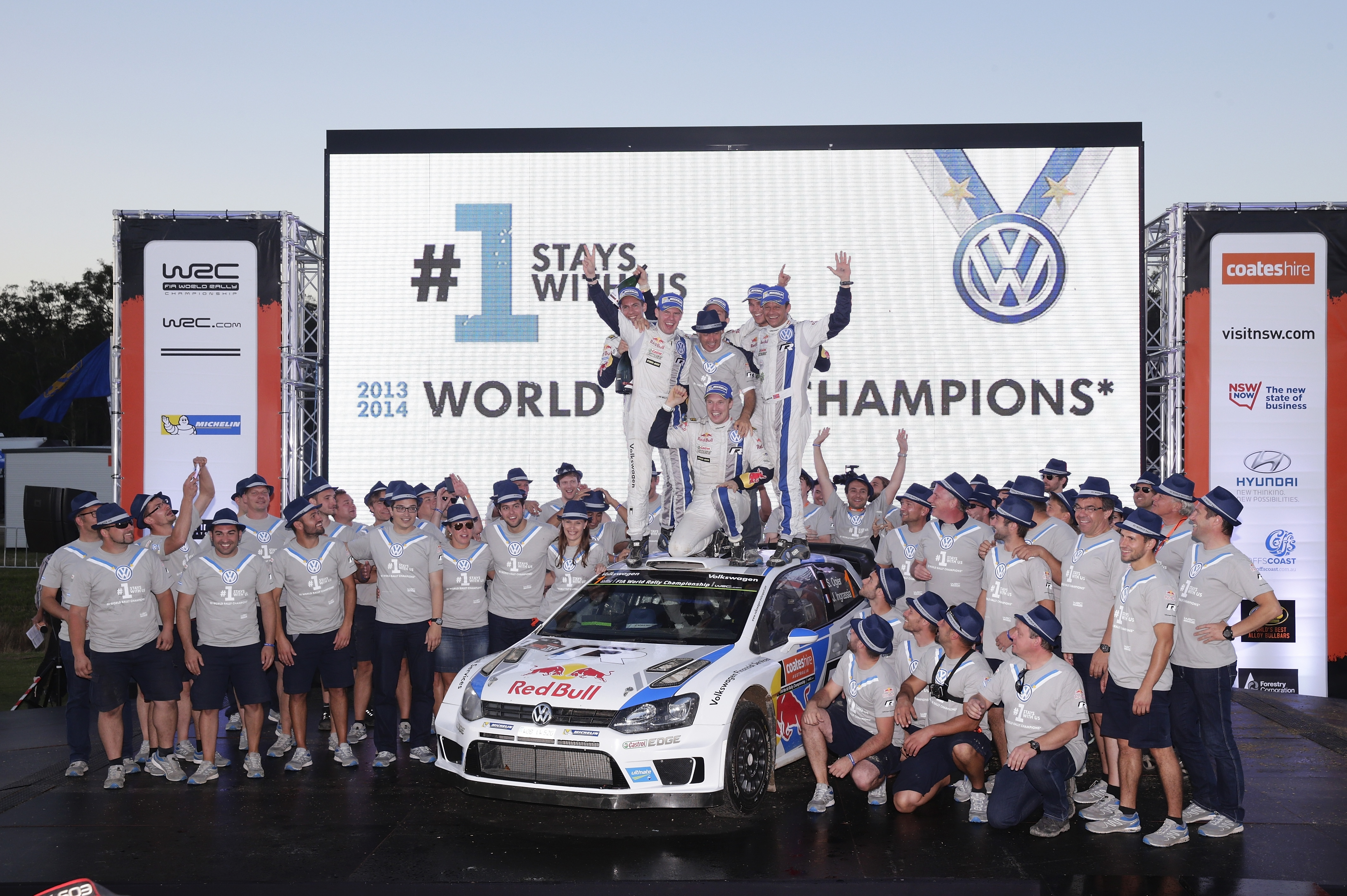
- Volkswagen Motorsport celebrates Podium
- Host country: Australia
- Rally base: Coffs Harbour, Australia
- Dates run: September 12 – September 14, 2014
- Stages: 20 (304.34 km; 189.11 miles)
- Stage surface: Gravel

Statistics
- Crews: 27 at start, 23 at finish

Overall results
- Overall winner: (France) Sébastien Ogier (France) Julien Ingrassia (Germany) Volkswagen Motorsport

The 2014 Coates Hire Rally Australia was the tenth round of the 2014 World Rally Championship season. The event was based in Coffs Harbour, New South Wales, and started on 12 September and finished on 14 September after twenty special stages, totaling 304.3 competitive kilometres.

French driver Sébastien Ogier won the Rally Australia for the second time, taking his sixth victory of the 2014 season. Volkswagen completed a podium lockout by having all three cars finishing in podium positions at the end of the rally.

== Entry list ==
Entry List
| No. | Entrant | Class | Driver | Co-driver | Car | Tyre |
|---|---|---|---|---|---|---|
| 1 | (Germany) Volkswagen Motorsport | WRC | (France) Sébastien Ogier | (France) Julien Ingrassia | Volkswagen Polo R WRC | M |
| 2 | (Germany) Volkswagen Motorsport | WRC | (Finland) Jari-Matti Latvala | (Finland) Miikka Anttila | Volkswagen Polo R WRC | M |
| 3 | (France) Citroën Total Abu Dhabi WRT | WRC | (United Kingdom) Kris Meeke | (Republic of Ireland) Paul Nagle | Citroën DS3 WRC | M |
| 4 | (France) Citroën Total Abu Dhabi WRT | WRC | (Norway) Mads Østberg | (Sweden) Jonas Andersson | Citroën DS3 WRC | M |
| 5 | (United Kingdom) M-Sport World Rally Team | WRC | (Finland) Mikko Hirvonen | (Finland) Jarmo Lehtinen | Ford Fiesta RS WRC | M |
| 6 | (United Kingdom) M-Sport World Rally Team | WRC | (United Kingdom) Elfyn Evans | (United Kingdom) Daniel Barritt | Ford Fiesta RS WRC | M |
| 7 | (Germany) Hyundai Shell World Rally Team | WRC | (Belgium) Thierry Neuville | (Belgium) Nicolas Gilsoul | Hyundai i20 WRC | M |
| 8 | (Germany) Hyundai Shell World Rally Team | WRC | (Australia) Chris Atkinson | (Belgium) Stéphane Prévot | Hyundai i20 WRC | M |
| 9 | (Germany) Volkswagen Motorsport II | WRC | (Norway) Andreas Mikkelsen | (Norway) Ola Fløene | Volkswagen Polo R WRC | M |
| 10 | (United Kingdom) RK M-Sport World Rally Team | WRC | (Poland) Robert Kubica | (Poland) Maciej Szczepaniak | Ford Fiesta RS WRC | M |
| 20 | (Germany) Hyundai Motorsport N | WRC | (New Zealand) Hayden Paddon | (New Zealand) John Kennard | Hyundai i20 WRC | M |
| 31 | (Saudi Arabia) Yazeed Racing | WRC-2 | (Saudi Arabia) Yazeed Al-Rajhi | (United Kingdom) Michael Orr | Ford Fiesta RRC | M |
| 32 | (Ukraine) Yuriy Protasov | WRC-2 | (Ukraine) Yuriy Protasov | (Ukraine) Pavlo Cherepin | Ford Fiesta RRC | M |
| 33 | (Italy) www.Rallyproject.com srl | WRC-2 | (Italy) Massimiliano Rendina | (Italy) Mario Pizzuti | Mitsubishi Lancer Evo X | P |
| 34 | (United Kingdom) Drive Dmack | WRC-2 | (Estonia) Ott Tänak | (Estonia) Raigo Mőlder | Ford Fiesta R5 | D |
| 35 | (United Kingdom) Drive DMACK | WRC-2 | (Finland) Jari Ketomaa | (Finland) Kaj Lindström | Ford Fiesta R5 | D |
| 36 | (Qatar) Nasser Al-Attiyah | WRC-2 | (Qatar) Nasser Al-Attiyah | (Italy) Giovanni Bernacchini | Ford Fiesta RRC | M |
| 37 | (Italy) FWRT s.r.l. | WRC-2 | (Italy) Lorenzo Bertelli | (Italy) Mitia Dotta | Ford Fiesta RRC | P |
| 38 | (Greece) Jourdan Serderidis | WRC-2 | (Greece) Jourdan Serderidis | (Belgium) Frédéric Miclotte | Ford Fiesta R5 | D |
| 45 | (Indonesia) Bosowa Rally Team | WRC-2 | (Indonesia) Subhan Aksa | (Italy) Nicola Arena | Ford Fiesta RRC | M |

| Icon | Class |
|---|---|
| WRC | WRC entries eligible to score manufacturer points |
| WRC | WRC entries ineligible to score manufacturer points |
| WRC-2 | Registered to take part in WRC-2 championship |

== Results ==
=== Event standings ===
| Pos. | No. | Driver | Co-driver | Team | Car | Class | Time | Difference | Points |
Overall classification
| 1 | 1 | (France) Sébastien Ogier | (France) Julien Ingrassia | (Germany) Volkswagen Motorsport | Volkswagen Polo R WRC | WRC | 2:53:18.0 | 0.0 | 27 |
| 2 | 2 | (Finland) Jari-Matti Latvala | (Finland) Miikka Anttila | (Germany) Volkswagen Motorsport | Volkswagen Polo R WRC | WRC | 2:53:24.8 | +6.8 | 21 |
| 3 | 9 | (Norway) Andreas Mikkelsen | (Norway) Ola Fløene | (Germany) Volkswagen Motorsport II | Volkswagen Polo R WRC | WRC | 2:54:36.0 | +1:18.0 | 15 |
| 4 | 3 | (United Kingdom) Kris Meeke | (Republic of Ireland) Paul Nagle | (France) Citroën Total Abu Dhabi WRT | Citroën DS3 WRC | WRC | 2:55:02.0 | +1:44.0 | 13 |
| 5 | 5 | (Finland) Mikko Hirvonen | (Finland) Jarmo Lehtinen | (United Kingdom) M-Sport World Rally Team | Ford Fiesta RS WRC | WRC | 2:55:11.6 | +1:53.6 | 10 |
| 6 | 20 | (New Zealand) Hayden Paddon | (New Zealand) John Kennard | (Germany) Hyundai Motorsport N | Hyundai i20 WRC | WRC | 2:56:14.2 | +2:56.2 | 8 |
| 7 | 7 | (Belgium) Thierry Neuville | (Belgium) Nicolas Gilsoul | (Germany) Hyundai Shell World Rally Team | Hyundai i20 WRC | WRC | 2:57:46.2 | +4:28.2 | 6 |
| 8 | 6 | (United Kingdom) Elfyn Evans | (United Kingdom) Daniel Barritt | (Germany) M-Sport World Rally Team | Ford Fiesta RS WRC | WRC | 2:58:28.0 | +5:10.0 | 4 |
| 9 | 10 | (Poland) Robert Kubica | (Poland) Maciek Szczepaniak | (United Kingdom) RK M-Sport World Rally Team | Ford Fiesta RS WRC | WRC | 2:59:57.8 | +6:39.8 | 2 |
| 10 | 8 | (Australia) Chris Atkinson | (Belgium) Stéphane Prévot | (Germany) Hyundai Shell World Rally Team | Hyundai i20 WRC | WRC | 3:02:47.4 | +9:29.4 | 1 |
WRC-2 standings
| 1 (11.) | 36 | (Qatar) Nasser Al-Attiyah | (Italy) Giovanni Bernacchini | (Qatar) Nasser Al-Attiyah | Ford Fiesta RRC | WRC-2 | 3:05:11.1 | 0.0 | 25 |
| 2 (12.) | 35 | (Finland) Jari Ketomaa | (Finland) Kaj Lindström | (United Kingdom) Drive Dmack | Ford Fiesta R5 | WRC-2 | 3:07:01.5 | +1:50.4 | 18 |
| 3 (13.) | 32 | (Ukraine) Yuriy Protasov | (Ukraine) Pavlo Cherepin | (Ukraine) Yuriy Protasov | Ford Fiesta RRC | WRC-2 | 3:07:48.1 | +2:37.0 | 15 |
| 4 (14.) | 37 | (Italy) Lorenzo Bertelli | (Italy) Mitia Dotta | (Italy) FWRT s.r.l. | Ford Fiesta RRC | WRC-2 | 3:08:14.1 | +3:03.0 | 12 |
| 5 (15.) | 45 | (Indonesia) Subhan Aksa | (Italy) Nicola Arena | (Indonesia) Bosowa Rally Team | Ford Fiesta RRC | WRC-2 | 3:11:51.3 | +6:40.2 | 10 |
| 6 (23.) | 33 | (Italy) Massimiliano Rendina | (Italy) Mario Pizzuti | (Italy) www.Rallyproject.com srl | Mitsubishi Lancer Evo X | WRC-2 | 4:16:05.9 | +1:10:54.8 | 8 |

=== Special stages ===
| Day | Stage | Name | Length | Winner | Car | Time | Rally leader |
|---|---|---|---|---|---|---|---|
| Leg 1 (12 Sep) | SS1 | Hydes Creek 1 | 10.73 km | (France) Sébastien Ogier | Volkswagen Polo R WRC | 6:26.6 | (France) Sébastien Ogier |
| Leg 1 (12 Sep) | SS2 | Bellingen 1 | 10.72 km | (United Kingdom) Kris Meeke | Citroën DS3 WRC | 6:26.2 | (France) Sébastien Ogier |
| Leg 1 (12 Sep) | SS3 | Newry 1 | 24.91 km | (United Kingdom) Kris Meeke | Citroën DS3 WRC | 14:46.1 | (United Kingdom) Kris Meeke |
| Leg 1 (12 Sep) | SS4 | Hydes Creek 2 | 10.73 km | (France) Sébastien Ogier | Volkswagen Polo R WRC | 6:19.9 | (United Kingdom) Kris Meeke |
| Leg 1 (12 Sep) | SS5 | Bellingen 2 | 10.72 km | (Finland) Jari-Matti Latvala | Volkswagen Polo R WRC | 6:15.9 | (United Kingdom) Kris Meeke |
| Leg 1 (12 Sep) | SS6 | Newry 2 | 24.91 km | (Finland) Jari-Matti Latvala | Volkswagen Polo R WRC | 14:22.7 | (United Kingdom) Kris Meeke |
| Leg 1 (12 Sep) | SS7 | SSS 1 | 1.56 km | (France) Sébastien Ogier | Volkswagen Polo R WRC | 1:37.2 | (Finland) Jari-Matti Latvala |
| Leg 1 (12 Sep) | SS8 | SSS 2 | 1.56 km | (France) Sébastien Ogier | Volkswagen Polo R WRC | 1:35.6 | (France) Sébastien Ogier |
| Leg 2 (13 Sep) | SS9 | Nambucca 1 | 48.92 km | (Finland) Jari-Matti Latvala | Volkswagen Polo R WRC | 27:01.6 | (Finland) Jari-Matti Latvala |
| Leg 2 (13 Sep) | SS10 | Valla 1 | 8.96 km | (Finland) Jari-Matti Latvala | Volkswagen Polo R WRC | 4:23.7 | (Finland) Jari-Matti Latvala |
| Leg 2 (13 Sep) | SS11 | Nambucca 2 | 48.92 km | (France) Sébastien Ogier | Volkswagen Polo R WRC | 26:39.4 | (France) Sébastien Ogier |
| Leg 2 (13 Sep) | SS12 | Valla 2 | 8.96 km | (France) Sébastien Ogier | Volkswagen Polo R WRC | 4:19.8 | (France) Sébastien Ogier |
| Leg 2 (13 Sep) | SS13 | SSS 3 | 1.56 km | (France) Sébastien Ogier | Volkswagen Polo R WRC | 1:40.8 | (France) Sébastien Ogier |
| Leg 2 (13 Sep) | SS14 | SSS 4 | 1.56 km | (France) Sébastien Ogier | Volkswagen Polo R WRC | 1:39.7 | (France) Sébastien Ogier |
| Leg 3 (14 Sep) | SS15 | Shipmans 1 | 24.72 km | (Finland) Jari-Matti Latvala | Volkswagen Polo R WRC | 12:46.9 | (France) Sébastien Ogier |
| Leg 3 (14 Sep) | SS16 | Bucca 1 | 10.86 km | (France) Sébastien Ogier | Volkswagen Polo R WRC | 6:38.2 | (France) Sébastien Ogier |
| Leg 3 (14 Sep) | SS17 | Wedding Bells 1 | 9.23 km | (United Kingdom) Kris Meeke | Citroën DS3 WRC | 5:26.0 | (France) Sébastien Ogier |
| Leg 3 (14 Sep) | SS18 | Shipmans 2 | 24.72 km | (France) Sébastien Ogier | Volkswagen Polo R WRC | 12:32.7 | (France) Sébastien Ogier |
| Leg 3 (14 Sep) | SS19 | Bucca 2 | 10.86 km | (Finland) Jari-Matti Latvala | Volkswagen Polo R WRC | 6:29.4 | (France) Sébastien Ogier |
| Leg 3 (14 Sep) | SS20 | Wedding Bells 2 (Power Stage) | 9.23 km | (Finland) Jari-Matti Latvala | Volkswagen Polo R WRC | 5:20.7 | (France) Sébastien Ogier |

=== Power Stage ===
The "Power stage" was a 9.23 km (5.74 mi) stage at the end of the rally.

| Pos | Driver | Car | Time | Diff. | Pts |
|---|---|---|---|---|---|
| 1 | (Finland) Jari-Matti Latvala | Volkswagen Polo R WRC | 5:20.7 | 0.0 | 3 |
| 2 | (France) Sébastien Ogier | Volkswagen Polo R WRC | 5:21.9 | +1.2 | 2 |
| 3 | (United Kingdom) Kris Meeke | Citroën DS3 WRC | 5:24.5 | +3.8 | 1 |

== Standings after the rally ==
=== WRC ===
Drivers' Championship standings

| Pos. | Driver | Points |
|---|---|---|
| 1 | (France) Sebastien Ogier | 214 |
| 2 | (Finland) Jari-Matti Latvala | 164 |
| 3 | (Norway) Andreas Mikkelsen | 125 |
| 4 | (Finland) Mikko Hirvonen | 83 |
| 5 | (Belgium) Thierry Neuville | 79 |

Manufacturers' Championship standings

| Pos. | Manufacturer | Points |
|---|---|---|
| 1 | (Germany) Volkswagen Motorsport | 348 |
| 2 | (France) Citroën Total Abu Dhabi WRT | 154 |
| 3 | (United Kingdom) M-Sport World Rally Team | 146 |
| 4 | (Germany) Hyundai Shell World Rally Team | 141 |
| 5 | (Germany) Volkswagen Motorsport II | 109 |

=== Other ===
WRC2 Drivers' Championship standings

| Pos. | Driver | Points |
|---|---|---|
| 1 | (Italy) Lorenzo Bertelli | 93 |
| 2 | (Ukraine) Yuriy Protasov | 90 |
| 3 | (Finland) Jari Ketomaa | 90 |
| 4 | (Qatar) Nasser Al-Attiyah | 85 |
| 5 | (Estonia) Ott Tänak | 78 |

WRC3 Drivers' Championship standings

| Pos. | Driver | Points |
|---|---|---|
| 1 | (France) Stéphane Lefebvre | 79 |
| 2 | (Germany) Christian Riedemann | 46 |
| 3 | (France) Quentin Giordano | 46 |
| 4 | (Slovakia) Martin Koči | 45 |
| 5 | (United Kingdom) Alastair Fisher | 40 |

Junior WRC Drivers' Championship standings

| Pos. | Driver | Points |
|---|---|---|
| 1 | (France) Stéphane Lefebvre | 81 |
| 2 | (Slovakia) Martin Koči | 52 |
| 3 | (France) Quentin Giordano | 49 |
| 4 | (Germany) Christian Riedemann | 46 |
| 5 | (United Kingdom) Alastair Fisher | 42 |
