= 2016 Rally Mexico =

2016 Rally Mexico: 13. Rally Guanajuato México
Round 3 of the 2016 World Rally Championship
← Previous event	Next event →
- Rally base: (Mexico) León
- Dates run: 3 – 6 March 2016
- Stages: 21 (399.67 km; 248.34 miles)
- Stage surface: Gravel

Overall results
- Overall winner: (Finland) Jari-Matti Latvala (Finland) Miikka Anttila (Germany) Volkswagen Motorsport

The 2016 Rally Mexico (formally the 13º Rally Guanajuato México) was the third round of the 2016 World Rally Championship. The race was held over four days between 3 March and 6 March 2016, and was based in León, Guanajuato, Mexico. Volkswagen's Jari-Matti Latvala won the race, his 16th win in the World Rally Championship. The 20th stage of the rally (Guanajuato) was the longest stage in the world championship for 30 years (excluding the 'competitive sections' of the Safari Rally) at 80 kilometres (50 mi) in length.

== Overall standings ==
Pos.	No.	Driver	Co-driver	Team	Car	Class	Time	Difference	Points
Overall classification
1	2	(Finland) Jari-Matti Latvala	(Finland) Miikka Anttila	(Germany) Volkswagen Motorsport	Volkswagen Polo R WRC	WRC	4:25:57.4		27
2	1	(France) Sébastien Ogier	(France) Julien Ingrassia	(Germany) Volkswagen Motorsport	Volkswagen Polo R WRC	WRC	4:27:02.4	+1:05.0	21
3	5	(Norway) Mads Østberg	(Norway) Ola Fløene	(United Kingdom) M-Sport World Rally Team	Ford Fiesta RS WRC	WRC	4:31:33.8	+5:36.4	15
4	4	(Spain) Dani Sordo	(Spain) Marc Martí	(Germany) Hyundai Motorsport	Hyundai i20 WRC	WRC	4:31:35.3	+5:37.9	12
5	20	(New Zealand) Hayden Paddon	(New Zealand) John Kennard	(Germany) Hyundai Motorsport N	Hyundai i20 WRC	WRC	4:32:20.0	+6:22.6	11
6	12	(Estonia) Ott Tänak	(Estonia) Raigo Mõlder	(United Kingdom) DMACK World Rally Team	Ford Fiesta RS WRC	WRC	4:35:56.9	+9:59.5	8
7	21	(Czech Republic) Martin Prokop	(Czech Republic) Jan Tománek	(Czech Republic) Jipocar Czech National Team	Ford Fiesta RS WRC	WRC	4:38:55.9	+12:58.5	6
8	37	(Italy) Lorenzo Bertelli	(Italy) Simone Scattolin	(Italy) FWRT s.r.l.	Ford Fiesta RS WRC	WRC	4:40:07.0	+14:09.6	4
9	32	(Finland) Teemu Suninen	(Finland) Mikko Markkula	(Finland) TGS Worldwide OU	Škoda Fabia R5	WRC-2	4:43:59.2	+18:01.8	2
10	81	(Ukraine) Valeriy Gorban	(Ukraine) Volodymyr Korsia	(Ukraine) Eurolamp World Rally Team	Mini John Cooper Works WRC	WRC	4:58:34.7	+32:37.3	1
WRC-2 standings
1 (9.)	32	(Finland) Teemu Suninen	(Finland) Mikko Markkula	(Finland) TGS Worldwide OU	Škoda Fabia R5	WRC-2	4:43:59.2		25
2 (11.)	31	(Poland) Hubert Ptaszek	(Poland) Maciej Szczepaniak	Peugeot Sport Slovakia	Peugeot 208 T16	WRC-2	5:04:10.8	+20:11.6	18
3 (12.)	33	(Italy) Max Rendina	(Italy) Emanuele Inglesi	(Italy) Motorsport Italia srl	Ford Fiesta R5	WRC-2	5:08:04.6	+24:05.4	15
4 (14.)	42	(Peru) Nicolás Fuchs	(Argentina) Fernando Mussano	(Netherlands) Wevers Sport	Škoda Fabia R5	WRC-2	5:20:54.8	+36:55.6	12
5 (19.)	32	(Germany) Armin Kremer	(Germany) Pirmin Winklhofer	(Austria) BRR Baumschlager Rallye & Racing Team	Škoda Fabia R5	WRC-2	5:52:06.0	+1:08:06.8	10
WRC-3 standings
1 (15.)	61	(France) Michel Fabre	(France) Maxime Vilmot	(France) Saintéloc Junior Team	Citroën DS3 R3T Max	WRC-3	5:34:30.7		25

== Special stages ==
Day	Stage	Name	Length	Winner	Car	Time	Rally leader
Leg 1	SS1	Street Stage Guanajuato	1.09 km	(Belgium) Thierry Neuville	Hyundai i20 WRC	0:59.1	(Belgium) Thierry Neuville
Leg 1	SS2	Super Special 1	2.30 km	(France) Sébastien Ogier	Volkswagen Polo R WRC	1:38.9	(France) Sébastien Ogier
Leg 1	SS3	Super Special 2	2.30 km	(France) Sébastien Ogier	Volkswagen Polo R WRC	1:38.1	(France) Sébastien Ogier
Leg 2	SS4	El Chocolate 1	54.21 km	(Finland) Jari-Matti Latvala	Volkswagen Polo R WRC	38:48.1	(Finland) Jari-Matti Latvala
Leg 2	SS5	Las Minas 1	15.36 km	(Finland) Jari-Matti Latvala	Volkswagen Polo R WRC	11:00.1	(Finland) Jari-Matti Latvala
Leg 2	SS6	Street Stage León 1	1.41 km	(Norway) Andreas Mikkelsen	Volkswagen Polo R WRC	1:19.0	(Finland) Jari-Matti Latvala
Leg 2	SS7	El Chocolate 2	54.21 km	(Finland) Jari-Matti Latvala	Volkswagen Polo R WRC	38:16.3	(Finland) Jari-Matti Latvala
Leg 2	SS8	Las Minas 2	15.36 km	(Finland) Jari-Matti Latvala	Volkswagen Polo R WRC	10:57.7	(Finland) Jari-Matti Latvala
Leg 2	SS9	Super Special 3	2.30 km	(Finland) Jari-Matti Latvala	Volkswagen Polo R WRC	1:39.1	(Finland) Jari-Matti Latvala
Leg 2	SS10	Super Special 4	2.30 km	(France) Sébastien Ogier (Spain) Dani Sordo	Volkswagen Polo R WRC; Hyundai i20 WRC	1:38.1	(Finland) Jari-Matti Latvala
Leg 3	SS11	Ibarrilla	30.38 km	(Finland) Jari-Matti Latvala	Volkswagen Polo R WRC	17:41.8	(Finland) Jari-Matti Latvala
Leg 3	SS12	Otates 1	42.62 km	(Finland) Jari-Matti Latvala	Volkswagen Polo R WRC	29:39.8	(Finland) Jari-Matti Latvala
Leg 3	SS13	El Brinco 1	7.15 km	(Finland) Jari-Matti Latvala	Volkswagen Polo R WRC	4:00.5	(Finland) Jari-Matti Latvala
Leg 3	SS14	Agua Zarca 1	16.47 km	(Finland) Jari-Matti Latvala	Volkswagen Polo R WRC	10:07.6	(Finland) Jari-Matti Latvala
Leg 3	SS15	Otates 2	42.62 km	(Finland) Jari-Matti Latvala	Volkswagen Polo R WRC	29:17.8	(Finland) Jari-Matti Latvala
Leg 3	SS16	El Brinco 2	7.15 km	(Finland) Jari-Matti Latvala	Volkswagen Polo R WRC	3:57.3	(Finland) Jari-Matti Latvala
Leg 3	SS17	Super Special 5	2.30 km	(Spain) Dani Sordo	Hyundai i20 WRC	1:39.2	(Finland) Jari-Matti Latvala
Leg 3	SS18	Super Special 6	2.30 km	(France) Sébastien Ogier	Volkswagen Polo R WRC	1:38.1	(Finland) Jari-Matti Latvala
Leg 3	SS19	Street Stage León 2	1.37 km	(France) Sébastien Ogier	Volkswagen Polo R WRC	1:18.6	(Finland) Jari-Matti Latvala
Leg 4	SS20	Guanajuato	80.00 km	(France) Sébastien Ogier	Volkswagen Polo R WRC	48:06.8	(Finland) Jari-Matti Latvala
Leg 4	SS21	Agua Zarca 2 (Power Stage)	16.47 km	(France) Sébastien Ogier	Volkswagen Polo R WRC	9:57.1	(Finland) Jari-Matti Latvala

=== Power Stage ===
The "Power stage" was a 16.47 km (10.23 mi) stage at the end of the rally.

Pos	Driver	Car	Time	Diff.	Pts
1	(France) Sébastien Ogier	Volkswagen Polo R WRC	9:57.1	0.0	3
2	(Finland) Jari-Matti Latvala	Volkswagen Polo R WRC	10:02.5	+5.4	2
3	(New Zealand) Hayden Paddon	Hyundai i20 WRC	10:07.5	+10.4	1
