= 2016 Wales Rally GB =

Rally car race

2016 Wales Rally GB: 72. Dayinsure Wales Rally GB 2016
Round 12 of the 2016 World Rally Championship
← Previous event	Next event →
- Rally base: (United Kingdom) Deeside
- Dates run: 27 – 30 October 2016
- Stages: 22 (330.21 km; 205.18 miles)
- Stage surface: Gravel

Overall results
- Overall winner: (France) Sébastien Ogier (France) Julien Ingrassia (Germany) Volkswagen Motorsport

The 2016 Wales Rally (formally the 72. Dayinsure Wales Rally GB) was the twelfth round of the 2016 World Rally Championship. The race was held over four days between 27 October and 30 October 2016, and was based in Deeside, United Kingdom. Volkswagen's Sébastien Ogier won the race, his 38th win in the World Rally Championship.

== Overall standings ==
Pos.	No.	Driver	Co-driver	Team	Car	Class	Time	Difference	Points
Overall classification
1	1	(France) Sébastien Ogier	(France) Julien Ingrassia	(Germany) Volkswagen Motorsport	Volkswagen Polo R WRC	WRC	3:14:30.2		25
2	12	(Estonia) Ott Tänak	(Estonia) Raigo Mõlder	(United Kingdom) DMACK World Rally Team	Ford Fiesta RS WRC	WRC	3:14:40.4	+10.2	21
3	3	(Belgium) Thierry Neuville	(Belgium) Nicolas Gilsoul	(Germany) Hyundai Motorsport	Hyundai i20 WRC	WRC	3:16:05.6	+1:35.4	16
4	20	(New Zealand) Hayden Paddon	(New Zealand) John Kennard	(Germany) Hyundai Motorsport N	Hyundai i20 WRC	WRC	3:16:25.1	+1:54.9	12
5	7	(United Kingdom) Kris Meeke	(Republic of Ireland) Paul Nagle	(France) Abu Dhabi Total World Rally Team	Citroën DS3 WRC	WRC	3:17:05.4	+2:35.2	10
6	4	(Spain) Dani Sordo	(Spain) Marc Martí	(Germany) Hyundai Motorsport	Hyundai i20 WRC	WRC	3:18:32.8	+4:02.6	8
7	2	(Finland) Jari-Matti Latvala	(Finland) Miikka Anttila	(Germany) Volkswagen Motorsport	Volkswagen Polo R WRC	WRC	3:18:58.5	+4:28.3	6
8	5	(Norway) Mads Østberg	(Norway) Ola Fløene	(United Kingdom) M-Sport World Rally Team	Ford Fiesta RS WRC	WRC	3:19:08.5	+4:38.3	4
9	14	(France) Stéphane Lefebvre	(France) Gilles De Turckheim	(France) Abu Dhabi Total World Rally Team	Citroën DS3 WRC	WRC	3:21:42.4	+7:12.2	2
10	6	(France) Eric Camilli	(France) Benjamin Veillas	(United Kingdom) M-Sport World Rally Team	Ford Fiesta RS WRC	WRC	3:22:49.5	+8:19.3	1
12	9	(Norway) Andreas Mikkelsen	(Norway) Anders Jæger	(Germany) Volkswagen Motorsport II	Volkswagen Polo R WRC	WRC	3:24:14.2	+9:44.0	2

== Special stages ==
Day	Stage	Name	Length	Winner	Car	Time	Rally leader
Leg 1	SS1	Myherin 1	31.82 km	(France) Sébastien Ogier	Volkswagen Polo R WRC	18:07.0	(France) Sébastien Ogier
Leg 1	SS2	Sweet Lamb 1	4.24 km	(France) Sébastien Ogier	Volkswagen Polo R WRC	2:49.0	(France) Sébastien Ogier
Leg 1	SS3	Hafren 1	35.14 km	(Estonia) Ott Tänak	Ford Fiesta RS WRC	20:45.4	(France) Sébastien Ogier
Leg 1	SS4	Dyfnant 1	17.91 km	(Estonia) Ott Tänak	Ford Fiesta RS WRC	10:18.9	(France) Sébastien Ogier
Leg 1	SS5	Myherin 2	31.82 km	(France) Sébastien Ogier	Volkswagen Polo R WRC	18:01.4	(France) Sébastien Ogier
Leg 1	SS6	Sweet Lamb 2	4.24 km	(France) Sébastien Ogier	Volkswagen Polo R WRC	2:53.7	(France) Sébastien Ogier
Leg 1	SS7	Hafren 2	35.14 km	(France) Sébastien Ogier	Volkswagen Polo R WRC	20:58.6	(France) Sébastien Ogier
Leg 1	SS8	Dyfnant 2	17.91 km	(Belgium) Thierry Neuville	Hyundai i20 WRC	10:32.1	(France) Sébastien Ogier
Leg 2	SS9	Pantperthog 1	9.64 km	(Estonia) Ott Tänak	Ford Fiesta RS WRC	5:47.1	(France) Sébastien Ogier
Leg 2	SS10	Dyfi 1	21.12 km	(France) Sébastien Ogier	Volkswagen Polo R WRC	12:01.2	(France) Sébastien Ogier
Leg 2	SS11	Gartheinog 1	11.34 km	(Belgium) Thierry Neuville	Hyundai i20 WRC	7:00.9	(France) Sébastien Ogier
Leg 2	SS12	Pantperthog 2	9.64 km	(Estonia) Ott Tänak	Ford Fiesta RS WRC	5:50.5	(France) Sébastien Ogier
Leg 2	SS13	Dyfi 2	21.12 km	(Estonia) Ott Tänak	Ford Fiesta RS WRC	12:12.9	(France) Sébastien Ogier
Leg 2	SS14	Gartheinog 2	11.34 km	(Estonia) Ott Tänak	Ford Fiesta RS WRC	7:07.4	(France) Sébastien Ogier
Leg 2	SS15	Aberhirnant	13.91 km	(France) Sébastien Ogier	Volkswagen Polo R WRC	7:29.3	(France) Sébastien Ogier
Leg 2	SS16	Cholmondeley Castle	1.80 km	(Norway) Andreas Mikkelsen	Volkswagen Polo R WRC	1:08.6	(France) Sébastien Ogier
Leg 3	SS17	Clocaenog 1	7.70 km	(Estonia) Ott Tänak	Ford Fiesta RS WRC	4:19.0	(France) Sébastien Ogier
Leg 3	SS18	Brenig 1	7.93 km	(Estonia) Ott Tänak	Ford Fiesta RS WRC	5:23.1	(France) Sébastien Ogier
Leg 3	SS19	Alwen 1	10.41 km	(Estonia) Ott Tänak	Ford Fiesta RS WRC	5:42.1	(France) Sébastien Ogier
Leg 3	SS20	Clocaenog 2	7.70 km	(Estonia) Ott Tänak	Ford Fiesta RS WRC	4:18.4	(France) Sébastien Ogier
Leg 3	SS21	Alwen 2	10.41 km	(Estonia) Ott Tänak	Ford Fiesta RS WRC	5:39.7	(France) Sébastien Ogier
Leg 3	SS22	Brenig 2 (Power Stage)	7.93 km	(Estonia) Ott Tänak	Ford Fiesta RS WRC	5:19.0	(France) Sébastien Ogier

=== Power Stage ===
The "Power stage" was a 7.93 km (4.93 mi) stage at the end of the rally.

Pos	Driver	Car	Time	Diff.	Pts
1	(Estonia) Ott Tänak	Ford Fiesta RS WRC	5:19.0	0.0	3
2	(Norway) Andreas Mikkelsen	Volkswagen Polo R WRC	5:20.4	+1.4	2
3	(Belgium) Thierry Neuville	Hyundai i20 WRC	5:23.5	+4.5	1
