= 2014 Rallye de France-Alsace =

Rallye de France — Alsace 2014: 5. Rallye de France-Alsace
Round 11 of the 2014 World Rally Championship season
← Previous event	Next event →
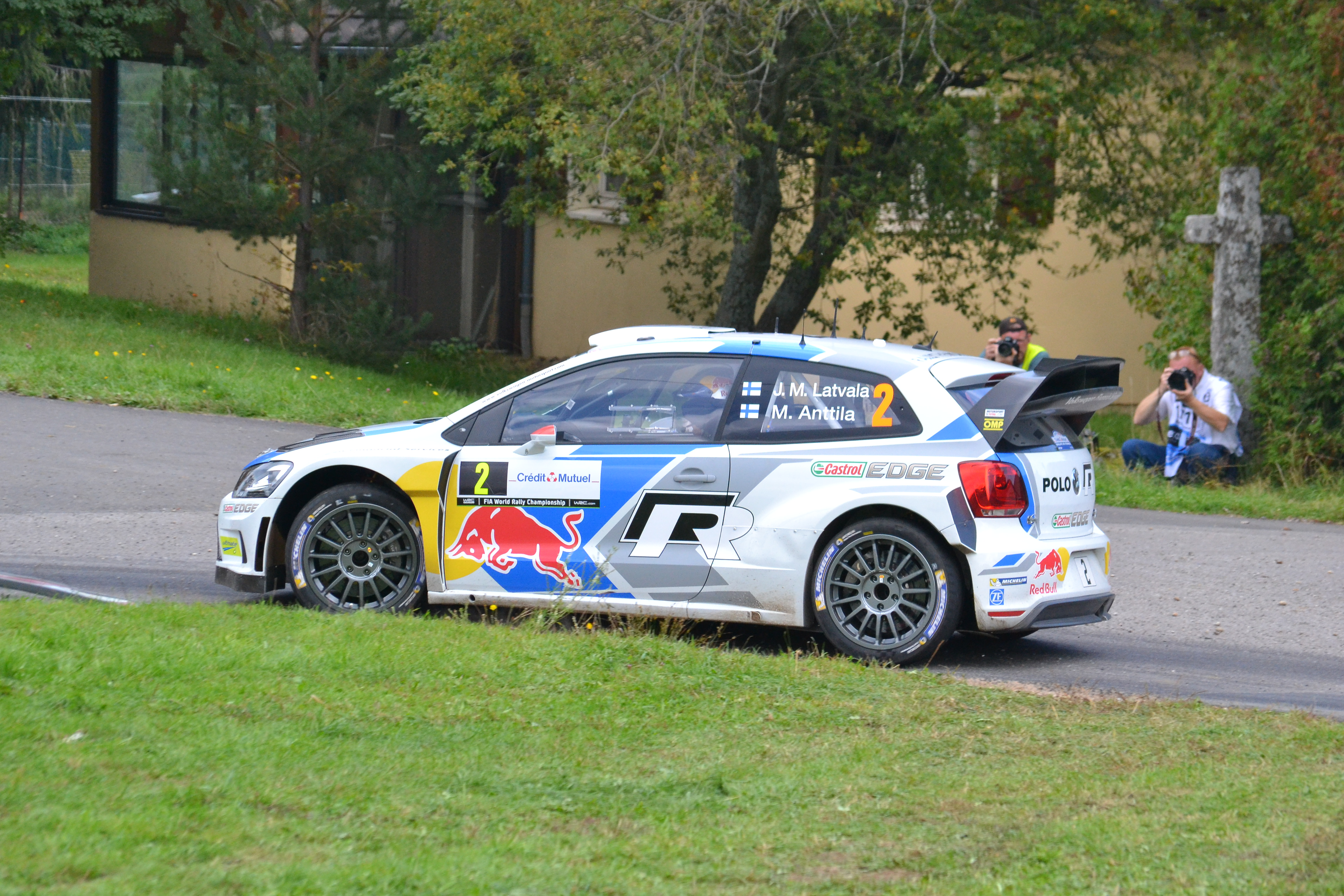
- Jari-Matti Latvala during Rally
- Host country: France
- Rally base: Strasbourg, France
- Dates run: October 3 – October 5, 2014
- Stages: 18 (303.63 km; 188.67 miles)
- Stage surface: Tarmac

Statistics
- Crews: 91 at start, 75 at finish

Overall results
- Overall winner: (Finland) Jari-Matti Latvala (Finland) Miikka Anttila (Germany) Volkswagen Motorsport

The 2014 Rallye de France — Alsace was the eleventh round of the 2014 World Rally Championship season. The event was based in Strasbourg, France, and started on 3 October and finished on 5 October after eighteen special stages, totaling 303.6 competitive kilometres.

Finnish driver Jari-Matti Latvala won the rally for the first time and in doing so became the first non-French driver to win the Strasbourg-based rally since its inception in 2010. It was Latvala's fourth and final victory of the 2014 season. There were no classified WRC-3 competitors as all those who finished were excluded for homologation irregularities. However, they were counted for in the JWRC category.

== Entry list ==
Notable entrants
No.	Entrant	Class	Driver	Co-driver	Car	Tyre
1	(Germany) Volkswagen Motorsport	WRC	(France) Sébastien Ogier	(France) Julien Ingrassia	Volkswagen Polo R WRC	MI
2	(Germany) Volkswagen Motorsport	WRC	(Finland) Jari-Matti Latvala	(Finland) Miikka Anttila	Volkswagen Polo R WRC	MI
3	(France) Citroën Total Abu Dhabi WRT	WRC	(United Kingdom) Kris Meeke	(Republic of Ireland) Paul Nagle	Citroën DS3 WRC	MI
4	(France) Citroën Total Abu Dhabi WRT	WRC	(Norway) Mads Østberg	(Sweden) Jonas Andersson	Citroën DS3 WRC	MI
5	(United Kingdom) M-Sport World Rally Team	WRC	(Finland) Mikko Hirvonen	(Finland) Jarmo Lehtinen	Ford Fiesta RS WRC	MI
6	(United Kingdom) M-Sport World Rally Team	WRC	(United Kingdom) Elfyn Evans	(United Kingdom) Daniel Barritt	Ford Fiesta RS WRC	MI
7	(Germany) Hyundai Shell World Rally Team	WRC	(Belgium) Thierry Neuville	(Belgium) Nicolas Gilsoul	Hyundai i20 WRC	MI
8	(Germany) Hyundai Shell World Rally Team	WRC	(Spain) Dani Sordo	(Spain) Marc Martí	Hyundai i20 WRC	MI
9	(Germany) Volkswagen Motorsport II	WRC	(Norway) Andreas Mikkelsen	(Norway) Ola Fløene	Volkswagen Polo R WRC	MI
10	(United Kingdom) RK M-Sport World Rally Team	WRC	(Poland) Robert Kubica	(Poland) Maciek Szczepaniak	Ford Fiesta RS WRC	MI
11	(United Kingdom) M-Sport World Rally Team	WRC	(Netherlands) Dennis Kuipers	(Belgium) Robin Buysmans	Ford Fiesta RS WRC	MI
12	(United Kingdom) M-Sport World Rally Team	WRC	(Ukraine) Yuriy Protasov	(Ukraine) Pavlo Cherepin	Ford Fiesta RS WRC	MI
20	(Germany) Hyundai Motorsport N	WRC	(France) Bryan Bouffier	(France) Xavier Panseri	Hyundai i20 WRC	MI
21	(Czech Republic) Jipocar Czech National Team	WRC	(Czech Republic) Martin Prokop	(Czech Republic) Jan Tománek	Ford Fiesta RS WRC	MI
22	(France) Julien Maurin	WRC	(France) Julien Maurin	(France) Nicolas Klinger	Ford Fiesta RS WRC	P
32	(Sweden) Pontus Tidemand	WRC-2	(Sweden) Pontus Tidemand	(Sweden) Patrik Barth	Ford Fiesta R5	MI
35	(Portugal) Bernardo Sousa	WRC-2	(Portugal) Bernardo Sousa	(Portugal) Hugo Magalhães	Ford Fiesta RRC	P
36	(Belgium) Top Teams by MY Racing	WRC-2	(France) Sébastien Chardonnet	(France) Thibault de la Haye	Citroën DS3 R5	MI
38	(Greece) Jourdan Serderidis	WRC-2	(Greece) Jourdan Serderidis	(Belgium) Frédéric Miclotte	Ford Fiesta R5	MI
39	(France) Quentin Gilbert	WRC-2	(France) Quentin Gilbert	(Belgium) Renaud Jamoul	Ford Fiesta R5	P
40	(Poland) C-Rally	WRC-2	(Poland) Jarosław Kołtun	(Poland) Ireneusz Pleskot	Ford Fiesta R5	MI
42	(Italy) Top Run Srl	WRC-2	(France) Johan Heloïse	(Italy) Roberto Mometti	Subaru Impreza WRX STi	P
49	(United Kingdom) Martin McCormack	WRC-2	(United Kingdom) Martin McCormack	(United Kingdom) James Morgan	Ford Fiesta R5	HK
52	(Italy) Simone Tempestini	WRC-3; JWRC	(Italy) Simone Tempestini	(Romania) Dorin Pulpea	Citroën DS3 R3T	MI
53	(Poland) Aron Domzala	WRC-3; JWRC	(Poland) Aron Domzala	(Poland) Szymon Gospodarczyk	Citroën DS3 R3T	MI
55	(France) Quentin Giordano	WRC-3; JWRC	(France) Quentin Giordano	(France) Valentin Sarreaud	Citroën DS3 R3T	MI
56	(Slovakia) Styllex Slovak National Team	WRC-3; JWRC	(Slovakia) Martin Koči	(Czech Republic) Lukáš Kosta	Citroën DS3 R3T	MI
57	(France) Stéphane Lefebvre	WRC-3; JWRC	(France) Stéphane Lefebvre	(France) Thomas Dubois	Citroën DS3 R3T	MI
62	(United Kingdom) Alastair Fisher	WRC-3; JWRC	(United Kingdom) Alastair Fisher	(United Kingdom) Gordon Noble	Citroën DS3 R3T	MI
63	(Austria) Wurmbrand Racing Team	WRC-3; JWRC	(Hungary) Kornél Lukács	(Hungary) Márk Mesterházi	Citroën DS3 R3T	MI
68	(France) Rallye Jeunes FFSA	WRC-3; JWRC	(France) Eric Camilli	(France) Maxime Vilmot	Citroën DS3 R3T	MI
69	(France) Frédéric Hauswald	WRC-3; JWRC	(France) Frédéric Hauswald	(France) Olivier Ural	Citroën DS3 R3T	MI
70	(France) Rallye Jeunes FFSA	WRC-3; JWRC	(France) Yohan Rossel	(France) Benoît Fulcrand	Citroën DS3 R3T	MI
71	(France) Alain Pyrame	WRC-3	(France) Alain Pyrame	(France) Vincent Varetz	Renault Clio RS R3T	P
73	(France) Armando Pereira	WRC	(France) Armando Pereira	(France) Damien Augustin	Citroën DS3 WRC	MI

Icon	Class
WRC	WRC entries eligible to score manufacturer points
WRC	Major entry ineligible to score manufacturer points
WRC-2	Registered to take part in WRC-2 championship
WRC-3	Registered to take part in WRC-3 championship
JWRC	Registered to take part in Junior World Rally championship

== Results ==
=== Event standings ===
Pos.	No.	Driver	Co-driver	Team	Car	Class	Time	Difference	Points
Overall classification
1	2	(Finland) Jari-Matti Latvala	(Finland) Miikka Anttila	(Germany) Volkswagen Motorsport	Volkswagen Polo R WRC	WRC	2:38:19.1	0.0	26
2	9	(Norway) Andreas Mikkelsen	(Norway) Ola Fløene	(Germany) Volkswagen Motorsport II	Volkswagen Polo R WRC	WRC	2:39:03.9	+44.8	18
3	3	(United Kingdom) Kris Meeke	(Republic of Ireland) Paul Nagle	(France) Citroën Total Abu Dhabi WRT	Citroën DS3 WRC	WRC	2:39:24.4	+1:05.3	15
4	8	(Spain) Dani Sordo	(Spain) Marc Martí	(Germany) Hyundai Shell World Rally Team	Hyundai i20 WRC	WRC	2:40:07.8	+1:48.7	12
5	5	(Finland) Mikko Hirvonen	(Finland) Jarmo Lehtinen	(United Kingdom) M-Sport World Rally Team	Ford Fiesta RS WRC	WRC	2:40:19.8	+2:00.7	10
6	6	(United Kingdom) Elfyn Evans	(United Kingdom) Daniel Barritt	(United Kingdom) M-Sport World Rally Team	Ford Fiesta RS WRC	WRC	2:41:19.9	+3:00.8	10
7	4	(Norway) Mads Østberg	(Sweden) Jonas Andersson	(France) Citroën Total Abu Dhabi WRT	Citroën DS3 WRC	WRC	2:41:21.6	+3:02.5	6
8	7	(Belgium) Thierry Neuville	(Belgium) Nicolas Gilsoul	(Germany) Hyundai Shell World Rally Team	Hyundai i20 WRC	WRC	2:42:27.5	+4:08.4	4
9	20	(France) Bryan Bouffier	(France) Xavier Panseri	(Germany) Hyundai Motorsport N	Hyundai i20 WRC	WRC	2:42:32.0	+4:12.9	2
10	21	(Czech Republic) Martin Prokop	(Czech Republic) Jan Tománek	(Czech Republic) Jipocar Czech National Team	Ford Fiesta RS WRC	WRC	2:44:26.6	+6:07.5	1
13	1	(France) Sébastien Ogier	(France) Julien Ingrassia	(Germany) Volkswagen Motorsport	Volkswagen Polo R WRC	WRC	2:46:55.2	+8:36.1	3
WRC-2 standings
1 (15.)	39	(France) Quentin Gilbert	(Belgium) Renaud Jamoul	(France) Quentin Gilbert	Ford Fiesta R5	WRC-2	2:48:56.8	0.0	25
2 (17.)	35	(Portugal) Bernardo Sousa	(Portugal) Hugo Magalhães	(Portugal) Bernardo Sousa	Ford Fiesta RRC	WRC-2	2:49:04.9	+8.1	18
3 (18.)	36	(France) Sébastien Chardonnet	(France) Thibault de la Haye	(Belgium) Top Teams by MY Racing	Citroën DS3 R5	WRC-2	2:51:04.1	+2:07.3	15
4 (23.)	32	(Sweden) Pontus Tidemand	(Sweden) Patrik Barth	(Sweden) Pontus Tidemand	Ford Fiesta R5	WRC-2	3:04:32.1	+15:35.3	12
5 (40.)	40	(Poland) Jarosław Kołtun	(Poland) Ireneusz Pleskot	(Poland) C-Rally	Ford Fiesta R5	WRC-2	3:18:24.1	+29:27.3	10
6 (42.)	42	(France) Johan Heloïse	(Italy) Roberto Mometti	(Italy) Top Run Srl	Subaru Impreza WRX STi	WRC-2	3:20:33.5	+31:36.7	8
7 (53.)	38	(Greece) Jourdan Serderidis	(Belgium) Frédéric Miclotte	(Greece) Jourdan Serderidis	Ford Fiesta R5	WRC-2	3:32:37.9	+43:41.1	6
JWRC standings
1	62	(United Kingdom) Alastair Fisher	(United Kingdom) Gordon Noble	(United Kingdom) Alastair Fisher	Citroën DS3 R3T	JWRC	2:57:06.5	0.0	25
2	68	(France) Eric Camilli	(France) Maxime Vilmot	(France) Rallye Jeunes FFSA	Citroën DS3 R3T	JWRC	2:57:57.4	+50.9	18
3	55	(France) Quentin Giordano	(France) Valentin Sarreaud	(France) Quentin Giordano	Citroën DS3 R3T	JWRC	2:58:27.5	+1:21.0	15
4	57	(France) Stéphane Lefebvre	(France) Thomas Dubois	(France) Stéphane Lefebvre	Citroën DS3 R3T	JWRC	2:58:48.5	+1:42.0	12
5	70	(France) Yohan Rossel	(Romania) Benoît Fulcrand	(France) Rallye Jeunes FFSA	Citroën DS3 R3T	JWRC	3:00:15.3	+3:08.8	10
6	53	(Poland) Aron Domzala	(Poland) Szymon Gospodarczyk	(Poland) Arom Domzala	Citroën DS3 R3T	JWRC	3:14:11.6	+17:05.1	8
7	57	(Slovakia) Martin Koči	(Czech Republic) Lukáš Kostka	(Slovakia) Styllex Slovak National Team	Citroën DS3 R3T	JWRC	3:14:23.3	+17:16.8	6

=== Special stages ===
Day	Stage	Name	Length	Winner	Car	Time	Rally leader
Leg 1 (3 Oct)	SS1	Col de la Charbonnière 1	11.11 km	(Finland) Jari-Matti Latvala	Volkswagen Polo R WRC	5:34.9	(Finland) Jari-Matti Latvala
Leg 1 (3 Oct)	SS2	Vosges - Pays d'Ormont 1	34.34 km	(Norway) Andreas Mikkelsen	Volkswagen Polo R WRC	18:33.5	(Norway) Andreas Mikkelsen
Leg 1 (3 Oct)	SS3	Pays de Salm 1	9.59 km	(Finland) Jari-Matti Latvala	Volkswagen Polo R WRC	4:54.6	(Finland) Jari-Matti Latvala
Leg 1 (3 Oct)	SS4	Col de la Charbonnière 2	11.11 km	(Norway) Andreas Mikkelsen	Volkswagen Polo R WRC	5:35.3	(Finland) Jari-Matti Latvala
Leg 1 (3 Oct)	SS5	Vosges - Pays d'Ormont 2	34.34 km	(Finland) Jari-Matti Latvala	Volkswagen Polo R WRC	18:31.5	(Finland) Jari-Matti Latvala
Leg 1 (3 Oct)	SS6	Pays de Salm 2	9.59 km	(Finland) Jari-Matti Latvala	Volkswagen Polo R WRC	4:53.2	(Finland) Jari-Matti Latvala
Leg 1 (3 Oct)	SS7	Strasbourg	4.67 km	(Spain) Dani Sordo (Norway) Andreas Mikkelsen	Hyundai i20 WRC; Volkswagen Polo R WRC	3:35.3	(Finland) Jari-Matti Latvala
Leg 2 (4 Oct)	SS8	Valée de Munster 1	18.90 km	(Finland) Jari-Matti Latvala	Volkswagen Polo R WRC	9:13.1	(Finland) Jari-Matti Latvala
Leg 2 (4 Oct)	SS9	Soultzeren - Le Grand Hohnack 1	19.93 km	(Finland) Jari-Matti Latvala	Volkswagen Polo R WRC	9:33.4	(Finland) Jari-Matti Latvala
Leg 2 (4 Oct)	SS10	Pays Welche - Riquewihr 1	21.49 km	(Finland) Jari-Matti Latvala	Volkswagen Polo R WRC	12:04.7	(Finland) Jari-Matti Latvala
Leg 2 (4 Oct)	SS11	Valée de Munster 2	18.90 km	(Finland) Jari-Matti Latvala	Volkswagen Polo R WRC	9:06.9	(Finland) Jari-Matti Latvala
Leg 2 (4 Oct)	SS12	Soultzeren - Le Grand Hohnack 2	19.93 km	(France) Sébastien Ogier	Volkswagen Polo R WRC	9:31.4	(Finland) Jari-Matti Latvala
Leg 2 (4 Oct)	SS13	Pays Welche - Riquewihr 2	21.49 km	(France) Sébastien Ogier	Volkswagen Polo R WRC	11:56.9	(Finland) Jari-Matti Latvala
Leg 2 (4 Oct)	SS14	Mulhouse	4.86 km	(Finland) Jari-Matti Latvala	Volkswagen Polo R WRC	3:22.8	(Finland) Jari-Matti Latvala
Leg 3 (5 Oct)	SS15	Foret de la Petite - Pierre 1	12.33 km	(Poland) Robert Kubica	Ford Fiesta RS WRC	6:10.5	(Finland) Jari-Matti Latvala
Leg 3 (5 Oct)	SS16	Foret de Saverne 1	19.36 km	(France) Sébastien Ogier	Volkswagen Polo R WRC	9:26.9	(Finland) Jari-Matti Latvala
Leg 3 (5 Oct)	SS17	Foret de la Petite - Pierre 2	12.33 km	(Norway) Mads Østberg	Citroën DS3 WRC	6:07.2	(Finland) Jari-Matti Latvala
Leg 3 (5 Oct)	SS18	Foret de Saverne 2 (Power Stage)	19.36 km	(France) Sébastien Ogier	Volkswagen Polo R WRC	9:20.8	(Finland) Jari-Matti Latvala

=== Power Stage ===
The "Power stage" was a 19.36 km (12.03 mi) stage at the end of the rally.

Pos	Driver	Car	Time	Diff.	Pts
1	(France) Sébastien Ogier	Volkswagen Polo R WRC	9:20.8	0.0	3
2	(United Kingdom) Elfyn Evans	Ford Fiesta RS WRC	9:30.3	+9.5	2
3	(Finland) Jari-Matti Latvala	Volkswagen Polo R WRC	9:33.7	+12.9	1

== Standings after the rally ==
=== WRC ===
Drivers' Championship standings

Pos.	Driver	Points
1	(France) Sebastien Ogier	217
2	(Finland) Jari-Matti Latvala	190
3	(Norway) Andreas Mikkelsen	143
4	(Finland) Mikko Hirvonen	93
5	(Belgium) Thierry Neuville	83

Manufacturers' Championship standings

Pos.	Manufacturer	Points
1	(Germany) Volkswagen Motorsport	373
2	(France) Citroën Total Abu Dhabi WRT	175
3	(United Kingdom) M-Sport World Rally Team	164
4	(Germany) Hyundai Shell World Rally Team	157
5	(Germany) Volkswagen Motorsport II	127

=== Other ===
WRC2 Drivers' Championship standings

Pos.	Driver	Points
1	(Italy) Lorenzo Bertelli	93
2	(Ukraine) Yuriy Protasov	90
3	(Finland) Jari Ketomaa	90
4	(Qatar) Nasser Al-Attiyah	85
5	(Estonia) Ott Tänak	78

WRC3 Drivers' Championship standings

Pos.	Driver	Points
1	(France) Stéphane Lefebvre	79
2	(Germany) Christian Riedemann	46
3	(France) Quentin Giordano	46
4	(Slovakia) Martin Koči	45
5	(United Kingdom) Alastair Fisher	40

Junior WRC Drivers' Championship standings

Pos.	Driver	Points
1	(France) Stéphane Lefebvre	93
2	(United Kingdom) Alastair Fisher	67
3	(France) Quentin Giordano	64
4	(Slovakia) Martin Koči	52
5	(Germany) Christian Riedemann	46
