= Quentin Gilbert =

French rally driver (born 1989)

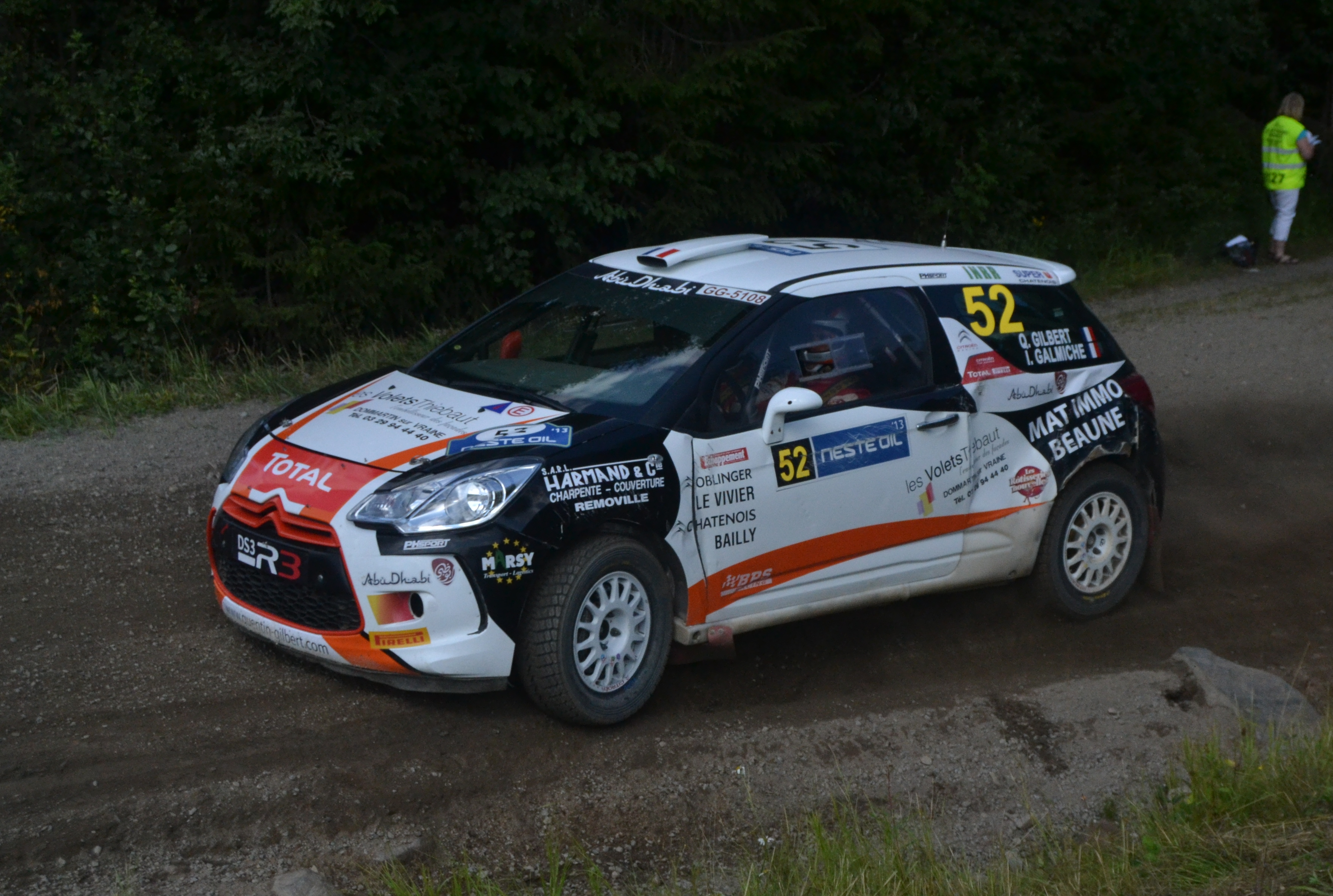
- Gilbert at 2013 Rally Finland

Personal information
- Nationality: (France) French
- Born: 29 May 1989 (age 37); Neufchâteau, Vosges, France

World Rally Championship record
- Years active: 2012–2017
- Teams: Collectif Equipe de France Rallye
- Rallies: 38
- Championships: 0
- Rally wins: 0
- Podiums: 0
- Stage wins: 0
- Total points: 0
- First rally: 2012 Rallye de France

Quentin Gilbert (born 29 May 1989) is a French rally driver. He made his WRC debut in 2012 Rallye de France driving a Citroën DS3 R3T with his co-driver Rémi Tutelaire.

In 2013, Gilbert competed in the WRC-3 championship, driving a Citroën DS3 R3T.

== Career results ==
=== WRC results ===
Year	Entrant	Car	1	2	3	4	5	6	7	8	9	10	11	12	13	14	Pos.	Points
2012	Collectif Equipe de France Rallye	Citroën DS3 R3T	MON	SWE	MEX	POR	ARG	GRE	NZL	FIN	GER	GBR	FRA; Ret	ITA	ESP		NC	0
2013	Quentin Gilbert	Citroën DS3 R3T	MON	SWE	MEX	POR; 26	ARG	GRE	ITA; 19	FIN; 33	GER; 40	AUS	FRA; 13	ESP	GBR; 16		NC	0
2014	Quentin Gilbert	Citroën DS3 R3T	MON; 39	SWE													NC	0
2014	Drive Dmack	Ford Fiesta R5			MEX; Ret		ARG; Ret	ITA; 17									NC	0
2014	Quentin Gilbert	Ford Fiesta R2				POR; Ret			POL; Ret	FIN; 21	GER; 57	AUS		ESP; 38			NC	0
2014	Quentin Gilbert	Ford Fiesta R5											FRA; 15		GBR; 21		NC	0
2015	Quentin Gilbert	Citroën DS3 R3T Max	MON; 22	SWE	MEX	ARG	POR; 22	ITA	POL; 53	FIN; 18	GER	AUS	FRA; 92	ESP; 18	GBR; 27		NC	0
2016	DGM Sport	Citroën DS3 R5	MON; 11	SWE	MEX	ARG	POR; Ret	ITA; 23	POL; Ret	FIN; 13	GER; Ret	CHN; C	FRA; 28	ESP			NC	0
2016	Abu Dhabi Total WRT	Citroën DS3 WRC													GBR; 17	AUS	NC	0
2017	Quentin Gilbert	Ford Fiesta R5	MON; 13														NC	0
2017	Quentin Gilbert	Škoda Fabia R5		SWE	MEX	FRA	ARG	POR; Ret	ITA	POL; 15	FIN; 14	GER; 13	ESP	GBR	AUS		NC	0

==== WRC-3 results ====
Year	Entrant	Car	1	2	3	4	5	6	7	8	9	10	11	12	13	Pos.	Points
2013	Quentin Gilbert	Citroën DS3 R3T	MON	SWE	MEX	POR; 3	ARG	GRE	ITA; 3	FIN; 5	GER; 5	AUS	FRA; 1	ESP	GBR	3rd	75
2014	Quentin Gilbert	Citroën DS3 R3T	MON; 1	SWE	MEX	POR	ARG	ITA	POL	FIN	GER	AUS	FRA	ESP	GBR	9th	25
2015	Quentin Gilbert	Citroën DS3 R3T Max	MON; 1	SWE	MEX	ARG	POR; 1	ITA	POL; 11	FIN; 1	GER	AUS	FRA; 3	ESP; 1	GBR; 3	1st	130

==== WRC-2 results ====
Year	Entrant	Car	1	2	3	4	5	6	7	8	9	10	11	12	13	14	Pos.	Points
2014	Drive Dmack	Ford Fiesta R5	MON	SWE	MEX; Ret	POR	ARG; Ret	ITA; 6	POL	FIN	GER	AUS					14th	37
2014	Quentin Gilbert	Ford Fiesta R5											FRA; 1	ESP	GBR; 8		14th	37
2016	DGM Sport	Citroën DS3 R5	MON; 3	SWE	MEX	ARG	POR; Ret	ITA; 10	POL; Ret	FIN; 5	GER; Ret	CHN; C	FRA; 6	ESP	GBR	AUS	11th	34
2017	Quentin Gilbert	Ford Fiesta R5	MON; 5														8th	55
2017	Quentin Gilbert	Škoda Fabia R5		SWE	MEX	FRA	ARG	POR; Ret	ITA	POL; 3	FIN; 2	GER; 4	ESP	GBR	AUS		8th	55

==== Drive DMACK Cup results ====
Year	Entrant	Car	1	2	3	4	5	Pos.	Points
2014	Quentin Gilbert	Ford Fiesta R2	POR; Ret	POL; Ret	FIN; 2	GER; 8	ESP; 7	3rd	55

==== JWRC results ====
Year	Entrant	Car	1	2	3	4	5	6	7	Pos.	Points
2015	Quentin Gilbert	Citroën DS3 R3T Max	MON; 1	POR; 1	POL; 7	FIN; 1	FRA; 1	ESP; 1	GBR; 2	1st	131

Sporting positions
Preceded by Stéphane Lefebvre	Junior World Rally; Champion; 2015	Succeeded by Simone Tempestini
Preceded by Stéphane Lefebvre	World Rally-3; Champion; 2015	Succeeded by Simone Tempestini
