= Martin Koči =

Slovak rally driver (born 1993)

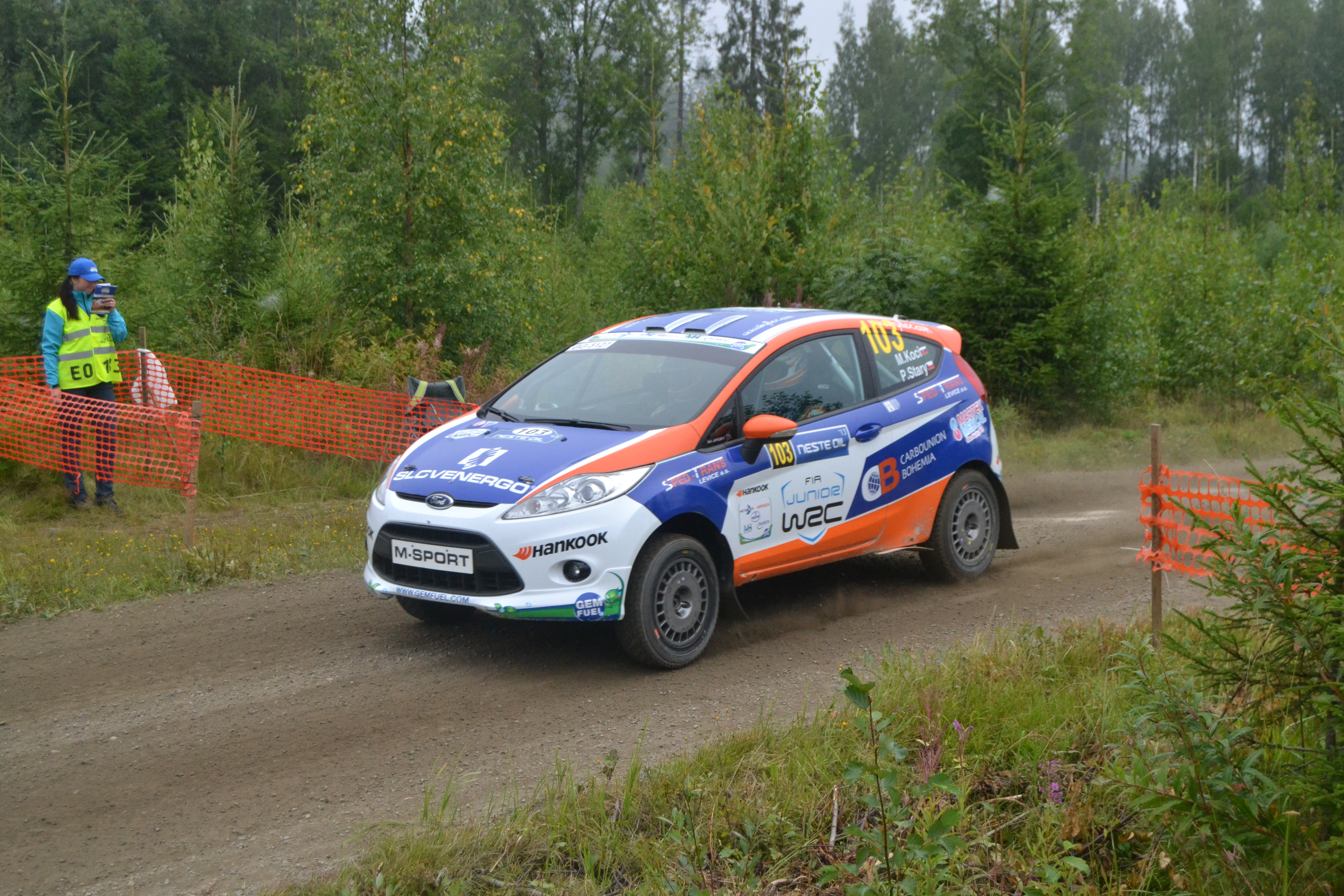
- Koči at 2013 Rally Finland

Personal information
- Nationality: (Slovakia) Slovak
- Born: April 5, 1993 (age 33)

World Rally Championship record
- Years active: 2012–2017, 2021–
- Teams: Styllex Motorsport s.r.o.
- Rallies: 33
- Championships: 0
- Rally wins: 0
- Podiums: 0
- Stage wins: 0
- Total points: 0
- First rally: 2012 Acropolis Rally

Martin Koči (born 5 April 1993) is a Slovak rally driver. He is currently racing in the JWRC.

== WRC results ==
Year	Entrant	Car	1	2	3	4	5	6	7	8	9	10	11	12	13	14	WDC	Points
2012	Martin Koči	Citroën C2 R2 Max	MON	SWE	MEX	POR	ARG	GRE; 23	NZL	FIN; Ret	GER	GBR	FRA	ITA	ESP		-	0
2013	Styllex Motorsport s.r.o.	Ford Fiesta R2	MON	SWE	MEX	POR	ARG	GRE; EX	ITA	FIN	GER	AUS	FRA	ESP; 21	GBR		NC	0
2014	Styllex Slovak National Team	Citroën DS3 R3T	MON	SWE; 20	MEX	POR; 29	ARG	ITA	POL; 25	FIN; 19	GER; Ret	AUS	FRA; EX	ESP	GBR; 28		NC	0
2015	Styllex Slovak National Team	Ford Fiesta R5	MON; Ret	SWE	MEX	ARG											NC	0
2015	Peugeot Sport Slovakia	Peugeot 208 T16 R5					POR; Ret	ITA	POL; 55	FIN; Ret	GER; Ret	AUS	FRA	ESP; 30	GBR		NC	0
2016	Styllex Slovak National Team	Citroën DS3 R3T Max	MON; 38	SWE	MEX	ARG	POR; 24	ITA	POL; DNS	FIN; 45	GER; 18	CHN; C	FRA; 21	ESP	GBR; 28	AUS	NC	0
2017	Styllex - Lracing	Škoda Fabia R5	MON	SWE	MEX	FRA; Ret	ARG	POR	ITA	POL	FIN	GER	ESP	GBR	AUS		NC	0
2021	Styllex Motorsport s.r.o.	Ford Fiesta Rally4	MON	ARC	CRO; 22	POR; 41	ITA	KEN	EST; Ret	BEL	GRE	FIN	ESP	MNZ			NC	0

=== JWRC ===
Year	Entrant	Car	1	2	3	4	5	6	Pos.	Points
2012	Styllex Motorsport s.r.o.*	Ford Fiesta R2	POR	GRE	FIN	GER; 7	FRA	ESP	-	0
2013	Styllex Motorsport s.r.o.	Ford Fiesta R2	POR; 5	GRE; 6	FIN; 7	GER; 4	FRA; 5	ESP; 4	6th	58
2014	Styllex Slovak National Team	Citroën DS3 R3T	POR; 5	POL; 4	FIN; 1	GER; Ret	FRA; 7	ESP; 2	3rd	76
2016	Styllex Slovak National Team	Citroën DS3 R3T Max	POR; 2	POL; DNS	FIN; 7	GER; 2	FRA; 3	GBR; 1	2nd	82
2021	Styllex Motorsport s.r.o.	Ford Fiesta Rally4	CRO; 4	POR; 4	EST; Ret	BEL	ESP		7th	31

*not eligible for points

==== WRC2 results ====
Year	Entrant	Car	1	2	3	4	5	6	7	8	9	10	11	12	13	Pos.	Points
2015	Styllex Slovak National Team	Ford Fiesta R5	MON; Ret	SWE	MEX	ARG										45th	1
2015	Peugeot Sport Slovakia	Peugeot 208 T16 R5					POR; Ret	ITA	POL; 19	FIN; Ret	GER; Ret	AUS	FRA	ESP; 10	GBR	45th	1
2017	Styllex - Lracing	Škoda Fabia R5	MON	SWE	MEX	FRA; Ret	ARG	POR	ITA	POL	FIN	GER	ESP	GBR	AUS	NC	0

=== IRC results ===
Year	Entrant	Car	1	2	3	4	5	6	7	8	9	10	11	12	13	WDC	Points
2011	(Slovakia) Styllex Motorsport s.r.o.	Citroën C2 R2 Max	MON	CAN	FRA	UKR	BEL	AZO	MAD	CZE; 47	HUN	ITA	SCO	CYP		-	0
2012	(Slovakia) Styllex Motorsport s.r.o.	Mitsubishi Lancer Evo IX	AZO	CAN	IRL	COR	ITA	YPR	SMR	ROM	ZLI; 17	YAL	SLI	SAN	CYP	-	0
