= Simone Tempestini =

Romanian rally driver

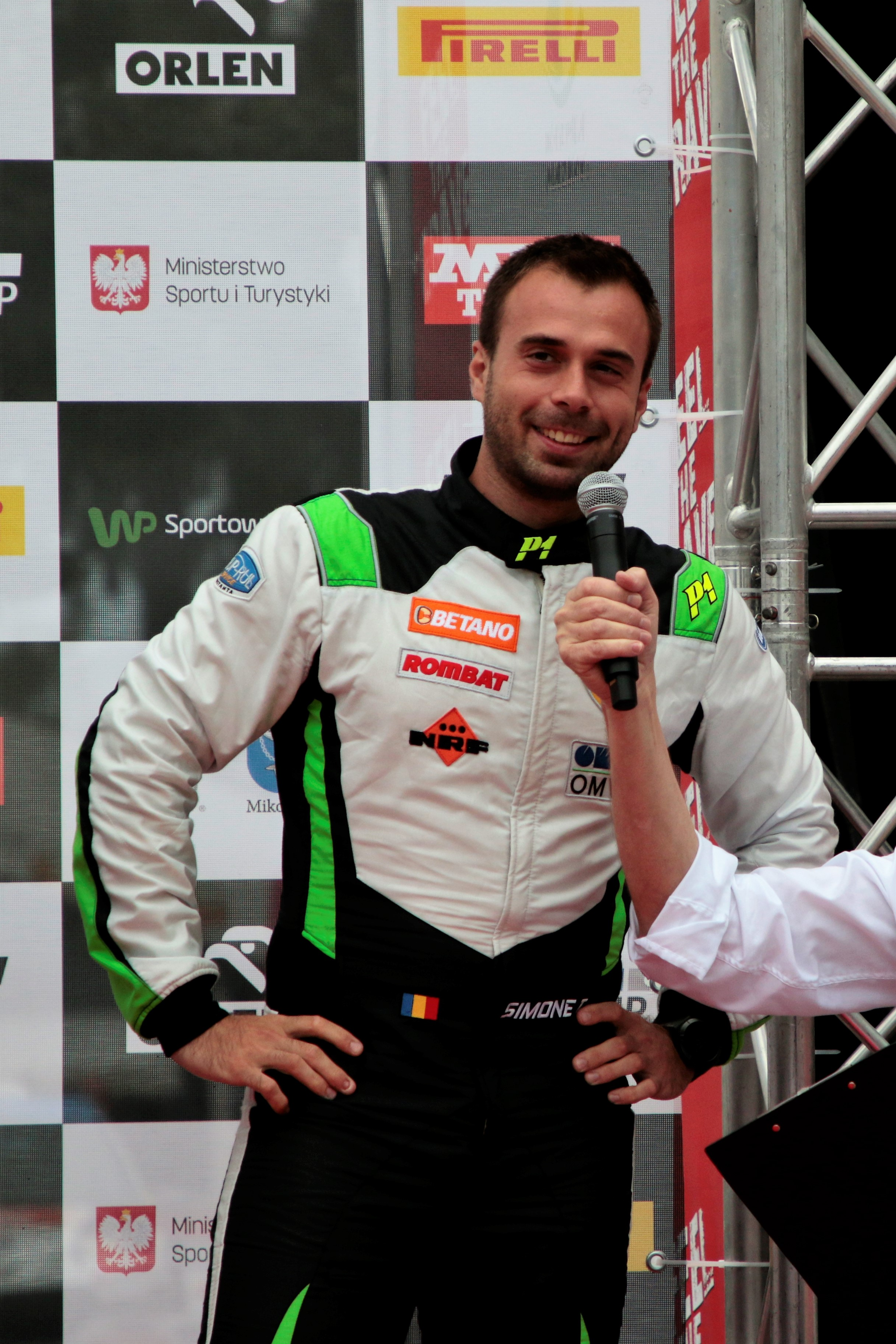
- Tempestini at the 2022 Rally Poland

Personal information
- Nationality: Romanian
- Born: August 12, 1994 (age 32); Treviso, Italy

World Rally Championship record
- Years active: 2013–present
- Co-driver: (Romania) Sergiu Itu
- Rallies: 49
- Championships: 2 (JWRC 2016 & WRC3 2016)
- Rally wins: 0
- Podiums: 0
- Stage wins: 0
- Total points: 4
- First rally: 2013 Rally Finland
- Last rally: 2019 Rally Catalunya
- Last updated on: 27.10.2019.

Simone Tempestini (born 12 August 1994) is a Romanian rally driver. He won the 2016 Junior World Rally Championship with the Romanian team Napoca Rally Academy and the Romanian Rally Championship in 2015, 2016, and 2018.

== Short biography ==
Tempestini made his competition debut in 2009. He won the 2015 and 2016 Romanian Rally Championship driving a Ford Fiesta R5 (and a Citroën DS3 R3T Max, in the last round of 2016) for the Napoca Rally Academy team, followed by another two champion titles, in 2018 and 2019.

Tempestini won both the 2016 JWRC and the WRC 3 categories of the World Rally Championship, driving for the same team. As part of his prize, he competes in the 2017 World Rally Championship-2 driving a Citroën DS3 R5.

Tempestini stated that he feels "100% Romanian" although he is the son of the Romanian-Italian driver Marco Tempestini. He has also competed in WRC with an Italian licence.

== Results ==
=== WRC results ===
Year	Entrant	Car	1	2	3	4	5	6	7	8	9	10	11	12	13	14	Pos.	Points
2013	Napoca Rally Academy	Škoda Fabia R2	MON	SWE	MEX	POR	ARG	GRE	ITA	FIN; Ret	GER	AUS	FRA	ESP			NC	0
2013	Napoca Rally Academy	Subaru Impreza STi R4													GBR; 39		NC	0
2014	Napoca Rally Academy	Citroën DS3 R3T	MON	SWE	MEX	POR; 35	ARG	ITA	POL; Ret	FIN; 38	GER; 26	AUS	FRA; Ret	ESP; 31	GBR; Ret		NC	0
2015	Napoca Rally Academy	Citroën DS3 R3T Max	MON; 27				POR; 44		POL; 26	FIN; 50	GER	AUS	FRA; 25	ESP; 21	GBR; Ret		NC	0
2015	Napoca Rally Academy	Subaru Impreza STi N14		SWE; 25	MEX; Ret	ARG; 19											NC	0
2015	Napoca Rally Academy	Mitsubishi Lancer Evo IX						ITA; 39									NC	0
2016	Napoca Rally Academy	Ford Fiesta R5	MON; 39	SWE; 20	MEX	ARG											NC	0
2016	Napoca Rally Academy	Citroën DS3 R3T Max					POR; 23	ITA	POL; 23	FIN; 20	GER; 17	CHN; C	FRA; 23	ESP	GBR; 30	AUS	NC	0
2017	Gekon Racing	Citroën DS3 R5	MON; Ret	SWE; Ret	MEX	FRA; 13	ARG	POR; 15	ITA	POL; 36	FIN; 19	GER; 15	ESP; 14	GBR; 50	AUS		NC	0
2018	Simone Tempestini	Ford Fiesta R5	MON	SWE	MEX	FRA	ARG	POR; 36									18th	4
2018	Citroën Total Rallye Team	Citroën C3 R5							ITA; Ret	FIN; 36	GER; 20						18th	4
2018	Simone Tempestini	Citroën C3 R5										TUR; 8	GBR; 15	ESP; 22	AUS		18th	4
2019	Friulmotor Rally Team	Hyundai i20 R5	MON	SWE	MEX	FRA; 47	ARG	CHL	POR; 18	ITA; 13	FIN	GER; 19	TUR	GBR	ESP; Ret	AUS; C	NC	0

=== JWRC results ===
Year	Entrant	Car	1	2	3	4	5	6	7	Pos.	Points
2014	Simone Tempestini	Citroën DS3 R3T	POR; 6	POL; Ret	FIN; 5	GER; 5	FRA; Ret	GBR; Ret		8th	28
2015	Simone Tempestini	Citroën DS3 R3T	MON; 4	POR; 6	POL; 1	FIN; 9	FRA	ESP; 3	GBR; Ret	4th	62
2016	Napoca Rally Academy	Citroën DS3 R3T	POR; 1	POL; 1	FIN; 2	GER; 1	FRA; 4	GBR; 2		1st	123

=== WRC-3 results ===
Year	Entrant	Car	1	2	3	4	5	6	7	8	9	10	11	12	13	14	Pos.	Points
2014	Simone Tempestini	Citroën DS3 R3T	MON	SWE	MEX	POR; 6	ARG	ITA	POL; Ret	FIN; 6	GER; 5	AUS	FRA; Ret	ESP	GBR; Ret		7th	26
2015	Simone Tempestini	Citroën DS3 R3T	MON; 4	SWE	MEX	ARG	POR; 7	ITA	POL; 1	FIN; 10	GER	AUS	FRA; 1	ESP; 4	GBR; Ret		3rd	81
2016	Napoca Rally Academy	Citroën DS3 R3T	MON	SWE	MEX	ARG	POR; 1	ITA	POL; 1	FIN; 2	GER; 1	CHN	FRA; 4	ESP	GBR; 2	AUS	1st	123

=== WRC-2 results ===
Year	Entrant	Car	1	2	3	4	5	6	7	8	9	10	11	12	13	14	Pos.	Points
2015	Napoca Rally Academy	Subaru Impreza WRX STi	MON	SWE; 9	MEX; Ret	ARG; 7	POR	ITA; 17	POL	FIN	GER	AUS	FRA	ESP	GBR		34th	8
2016	Napoca Rally Academy	Ford Fiesta R5	MON; 9	SWE; 9	MEX	ARG	POR	ITA	POL	FIN	GER	CHN	FRA	ESP	GBR	AUS	38th	4
2017	Gekon Racing	Citroën DS3 R5	MON	SWE	MEX	FRA; 4	ARG	POR; 3	ITA	POL; 10	FIN; 5	GER; 6	ESP; 5	GBR; 20	AUS		7th	56
2018	Simone Tempestini	Ford Fiesta R5	MON	SWE	MEX	FRA	ARG	POR; 16									15th	28
2018	Citroën Total Rallye Team	Citroën C3 R5							ITA; Ret	FIN; 9	GER; 10						15th	28
2018	Simone Tempestini	Citroën C3 R5										TUR; 2	GBR; 7	ESP; 10	AUS		15th	28
2019	Friulmotor Rally Team	Hyundai i20 R5	MON	SWE	MEX	FRA; 11	ARG	CHL	POR; 10	ITA; 3	FIN	GER; 4	TUR	GBR	ESP; Ret	AUS; C	17th	28

=== European Rally Championship results ===
Year	Entrant	Car	1	2	3	4	5	6	7	8	Pos.	Points
2017	Gekon Racing	Citroën DS3 R5	AZO	CAN	ACR	CYP	RZE	ZLÍ	RMC; 5	LIE	24th	15
2020	Tagai Racing Technology	Škoda Fabia R5	ITA; 5	LAT	PRT	HUN					19th	21
2020	Citroen Rally Team Hungary	Citroën C3 R5					ESP; 14				19th	21
2021	Delta Rally	Fabia R5 Evo	POL; Ret	LAT; 10	ITA; 7	CZE	POR				24th	21
2021	Botka Rally Team	Fabia R5 Evo						POR; Ret	HUN; WD	ESP	24th	21
2022	Keane Motorsport	Škoda Fabia Rally2 evo	POR; Ret		ESP; 8	POL; 5	LAT; 9	ITA; 6	CZE; WD	ESP	4th	79
2022	RB Motorsport	Škoda Fabia Rally2 evo		POR; 4							4th	79
2023	Simone Tempestini	Škoda Fabia Rally2 evo	POR; 11	ESP	POL; 8	LAT	SWE	ITA; 15	CZE; 10	HUN	20th	25
2024	Simone Tempestini	Škoda Fabia RS Rally2	HUN; 1	ESP	SWE; 10	EST; Ret	ITA; 4	CZE	GBR; Ret	POL; Ret	6th	59
2025	Team MRF Tyres	Škoda Fabia RS Rally2	ESP; Ret	HUN; Ret	SWE; 9	POL; 6	ITA; Ret	CZE; Ret	GBR	CRO; 10	9th	36
