= 2017 WRC2 Championship =

The 2017 FIA WRC2 Championship is the fifth season of the WRC2, a rallying championship organised and governed by the Fédération Internationale de l'Automobile, running in support of the World Rally Championship. The Championship is open to cars complying with R4, R5, and Super 2000 regulations. Esapekka Lappi did not return to defend his 2016 title as he left Škoda Motorsport for the top WRC category to become third driver of Toyota GAZOO Racing. However, Škoda Motorsport retained the title thanks to Pontus Tidemand who won the championship after Rallye Deutschland.

== Calendar ==
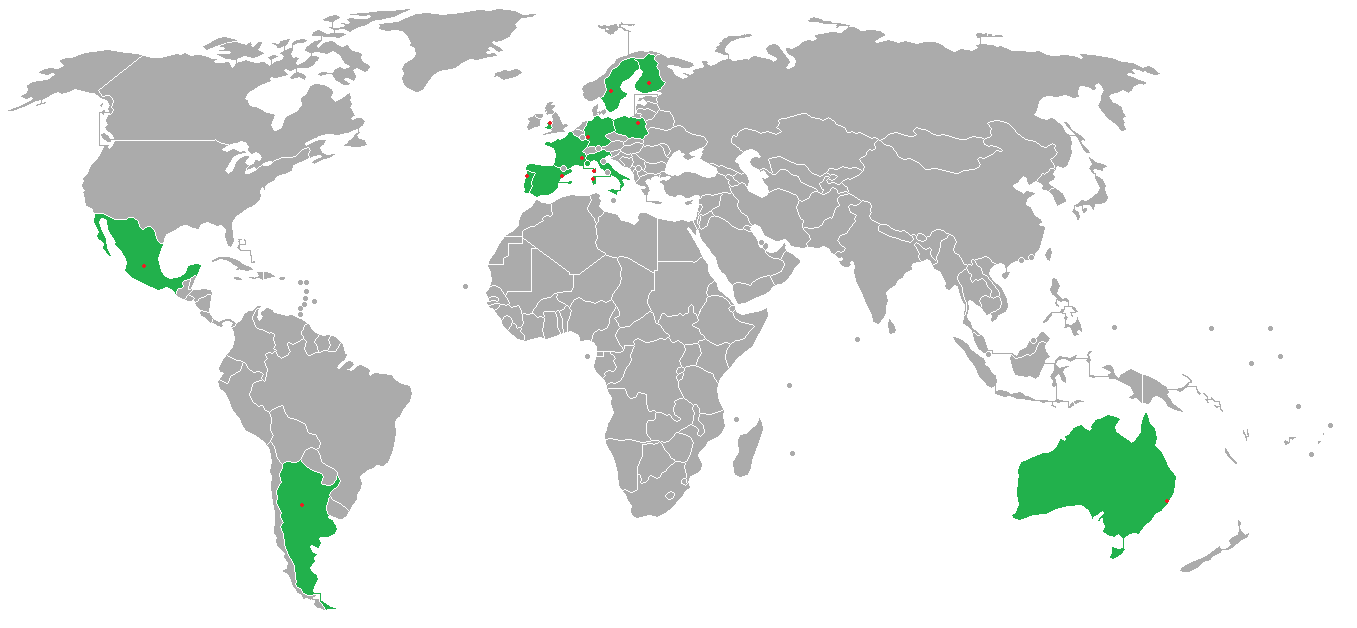
Nations that hosted a rally in 2017 are highlighted in green, with rally headquarters marked by a red dot.

The season was contested over thirteen rounds in Europe, the Americas and Oceania.

Round	Dates		Rally name	Rally headquarters	Rally details		
Round	Start	Finish	Rally name	Rally headquarters	Surface	Stages	Distance
1	19 January	22 January	(Monaco) Monte Carlo Rally	Gap, Hautes-Alpes, France	Mixed (Note: Rallye Monte Carlo was run on a tarmac and snow surface.)	15 (Note: Rallye Monte Carlo was shortened when the first stage was cancelled due to a fatal accident involving a spectator. The sixteenth stage was later cancelled owing to overcrowding of spectators.)	355.96 km
2	9 February	12 February	Rally Sweden	Torsby, Värmland	Snow	17 (Note: Rally Sweden was shortened when the second pass over the Knon stage was cancelled on the advice of the FIA as the leading drivers exceeded the maximum average stage speed of 130 km/h (80.8 mph) during the first run through the stage.)	305.83 km
3	9 March	12 March	Rally Mexico	León, Guanajuato	Gravel	17 (Note: Rally Mexico had its route shortened when a highway accident prevented the cars being transported to León in time for the start of the first stages.)	231.25 km
4	7 April	9 April	(France) Tour de Corse	Bastia, Haute-Corse	Tarmac	10	316.76 km
5	27 April	30 April	Rally Argentina	Villa Carlos Paz, Córdoba	Gravel	18	356.49 km
6	18 May	21 May	Rally de Portugal	Matosinhos, Porto	Gravel	19	349.17 km
7	8 June	11 June	(Italy) Rally Italia Sardegna	Alghero, Sardinia	Gravel	19	312.66 km
8	29 June	2 July	Rally Poland	Mikołajki, Warmia-Masuria	Gravel	22 (Note: The sixth stage of Rally Poland was cancelled after heavy rains in the region created large puddles of standing water on the stage which was subsequently deemed too dangerous.)	338.34 km
9	27 July	30 July	Rally Finland	Jyväskylä, Keski-Suomi	Gravel	25	315.62 km
10	17 August	20 August	(Germany) Rallye Deutschland	Saarbrücken, Saarland	Tarmac	21	309.17 km
11	6 October	8 October	(Spain) Rally Catalunya	Salou, Tarragona	Mixed (Note: Rally Catalunya was run on a tarmac and gravel surface.)	19	312.02 km
12	26 October	29 October	(United Kingdom) Wales Rally GB	Deeside, Flintshire	Gravel	20	306.13 km
13	17 November	19 November	Rally Australia	Coffs Harbour, New South Wales	Gravel	19 (Note: Rally Australia had its route shortened after a bridge in the Newry stage was found to be damaged, making the second pass over the stage impossible to complete. The penultimate stage, Pilbara Reverse 2, was also cancelled after heavy rain made conditions unsafe.)	287.68 km

=== Calendar changes ===
The FIA re-organised the calendar for the 2017 season to include a greater variation in surfaces between events, bringing the Tour de Corse forward from October to April. The decision was made after concerns were expressed about the 2016 calendar, which originally contained six consecutive gravel events followed by four tarmac rallies.

The Rally of China was removed from the calendar. The event had been included on the 2016 calendar before storm damage to the proposed route forced its cancellation. The round was removed from the 2017 calendar to give event organisers more time to prepare for a future bid to rejoin the calendar. Similarly, the FIA put the Rallies of Argentina and Poland on notice regarding safety concerns, threatening to rescind their World Championship status for the 2017 season unless safety standards were improved in 2016, with drivers citing a lack of safety marshalls and expressing concerns over spectators getting too close to the cars as the main areas to be addressed. Both events were subsequently included on the calendar.

The Rallies of Sweden and Germany changed their headquarters. The Rally of Sweden stayed within Värmland County, but relocated from Karlstad to Torsby. The Rally of Germany moved from Trier in Rhineland-Palatine to Saarbrücken in the neighbouring state of Saarland.

=== Route changes ===
The Rallye Monte-Carlo introduced a heavily revised itinerary, with eighty-five percent of the route used in 2016 being revised for the 2017 event, which saw the competitive distance increase from 337.59 km to 382.65 km and included the Col de Turini as part of the Power Stage. Rally Sweden adjusted its route to remove the emphasis on purpose-built stages that had filled out the event itinerary in previous years. The new route raised the average speed of the rally and introduced more competitive mileage in Hedmark County in neighbouring Norway.

Rally Mexico also featured route revisions, with the eighty-kilometre Guanajuato stage—the longest in the championship in 2016—removed from the schedule; however, the addition of new stages and further changes to existing ones meant that the overall competitive distance of the 2017 rally was only six kilometres shorter than the route used in the 2016 event. The rally started in Mexico City with a spectator-friendly stage before moving to its traditional headquarters in León. The Tour de Corse shortened its route by seventy-four kilometres, from 390.92 km in 2016 down to 316.76 km in 2017, with most of the changes coming from shortening each of the individual stages used in 2016. Rally Portugal shortened its route by twenty kilometres, reintroducing stages that had not been used for several years and reconfiguring stages from the 2016 event. Rally Poland also revised its route, introducing a series of brand-new stages close to the Russian border. The changes saw the crews compete on a wider ranges of surfaces—including tarmac and cobblestones—within individual stages, although the rally was still officially classified as a gravel surface event.

Following the cancellation of stages in Rally Sweden when the front-running cars exceeded the maximum average speed mandated by the FIA, Rally Finland was forced to revise its route to find ways of keeping the average stage speed down—with some estimates predicting that the 2017 generation of cars could exceed 140 km/h (87.0 mph)—to avoid stage cancellations. This was achieved by installing artificial chicanes into all but two of the stages, which proved to be controversial as drivers complained that they were too narrow and thus had the potential to damage cars, and were poorly-positioned with little regulatory oversight from rally organisers. With Rallye Deutschland moving to a new headquarters, the rally routed was revised. The vineyard and military proving ground stages in the Baumholder region were retained, but the final leg of the route was changed to introduce high-speed stages based on country lanes.

Rally Catalunya introduced several new and returning stages to its route, focusing on the tarmac legs of the event. Organisers of the Wales Rally GB retained the event route used in 2016, but revised the itinerary to increase its difficulty, with the route featuring earlier start times, later finishes and the reintroduction of night stages. Rally Australia underwent route revisions, introducing a new loop of stages north of the rally headquarters in Coffs Harbour. The new stages were designed to be faster and more technical than in previous events.

== Teams and drivers ==
Crews that are eligible for the WRC2 title
Entrant	Car	Class	Tyre	Drivers	Co-drivers	Rounds
(France) CHL Sport Auto	Citroën DS3 R5	R5	MI	(France) Yoann Bonato	(France) Benjamin Boulloud	1, 4, 6, 8, 10–12
(Belgium) J-Motorsport	Citroën DS3 R5	R5	MI	(Sweden) Emil Bergkvist	(Sweden) Joakim Sjöberg	1–2, 4, 6
(Belgium) J-Motorsport	Citroën DS3 R5	R5	MI	(Sweden) Emil Bergkvist	(Norway) Ola Fløene	10, 12
(United Kingdom) M-Sport World Rally Team	Ford Fiesta R5	R5	MI	(France) Eric Camilli	(France) Benjamin Veillas	1–4, 6, 10, 12
(United Kingdom) M-Sport World Rally Team	Ford Fiesta R5	R5	MI	(Finland) Teemu Suninen	(Finland) Mikko Markkula	2, 4, 6, 10–12
(United Kingdom) M-Sport World Rally Team	Ford Fiesta R5	R5	MI	(United Kingdom) Gus Greensmith	(United Kingdom) Craig Parry	2, 6, 8–12
(United Kingdom) M-Sport World Rally Team	Ford Fiesta R5	R5	MI	(France) Pierre-Louis Loubet	(France) Vincent Landais	6–7, 9–10, 12
(France) PH Sport	Citroën DS3 R5	R5	MI	(France) Pierre-Louis Loubet	(France) Vincent Landais	2, 4
(Czech Republic) Škoda Motorsport	Škoda Fabia R5	R5	MI	(Sweden) Pontus Tidemand	(Sweden) Jonas Andersson	2–3, 5–6, 10, 12
(Czech Republic) Škoda Motorsport II	Škoda Fabia R5	R5	MI	(Sweden) Pontus Tidemand	(Sweden) Jonas Andersson	8
(Italy) Motorsport Italia SRL	Škoda Fabia R5	R5	DM	(Mexico) Benito Guerra	(Spain) Borja Rozada	3, 12
(Italy) Motorsport Italia SRL	Škoda Fabia R5	R5	MI	(Mexico) Benito Guerra	(Spain) Daniel Cué	5–6, 8, 10–11
(Czech Republic) Gekon Racing	Citroën DS3 R5	R5	MI	(Romania) Simone Tempestini	(Italy) Giovanni Bernacchini	4, 6, 8–12
(Italy) ACI Team Italia	Hyundai i20 R5	R5	MI	(Italy) Fabio Andolfi	(Italy) Manuel Fenoli	4, 6–10
(Italy) ACI Team Italia	Hyundai i20 R5	R5	MI	(Italy) Fabio Andolfi	(Italy) Simone Scattolin	11–12
(Hungary) TRT Peugeot World Rally Team	Peugeot 208 T16 R5	R5	MI	(Poland) Łukasz Pieniążek	(Poland) Przemysław Mazur	4, 6–8, 10–11
(Finland) Printsport	Škoda Fabia R5	R5	MI	(Poland) Łukasz Pieniążek	(Poland) Przemysław Mazur	12

Key
Icon	Class
R4	Classification within Group R
R5	Classification within Group R
S	Super 2000

Crews that are ineligible for the WRC2 title
Entrant	Car	Class	Tyre	Drivers	Co-drivers	Rounds
(Czech Republic) Škoda Motorsport	Škoda Fabia R5	R5	MI	(Norway) Andreas Mikkelsen	(Norway) Anders Jæger	1, 4, 6
(Czech Republic) Škoda Motorsport	Škoda Fabia R5	R5	MI	(Norway) Ole Christian Veiby	(Norway) Stig Rune Skjærmoen	12
(Czech Republic) Škoda Motorsport	Škoda Fabia R5	R5	MI	(Czech Republic) Jan Kopecký	(Czech Republic) Pavel Dresler	1, 4, 10
(Czech Republic) Škoda Motorsport II	Škoda Fabia R5	R5	MI	(Czech Republic) Jan Kopecký	(Czech Republic) Pavel Dresler	7, 11
(Czech Republic) Škoda Motorsport II	Škoda Fabia R5	R5	MI	(Finland) Juuso Nordgren	(Finland) Tapio Suominen	11–12
(Finland) TGS Worldwide	Škoda Fabia R5	R5	MI	(Finland) Juuso Nordgren	(Finland) Mikael Korhonen	9
(Austria) BRR Baumschlager Rally & Rally Team	Škoda Fabia R5	R5	DM	(Germany) Armin Kremer	(Germany) Pirmin Winklhofer	1
(Austria) BRR Baumschlager Rally & Rally Team	Škoda Fabia R5	R5	MI	(Germany) Marijan Griebel	(Germany) Stefan Kopczyk	10
(Hungary) Tagai Racing Technology	Škoda Fabia R5	R5	DM	(France) Quentin Gilbert	(Belgium) Renaud Jamoul	6, 8–10
(Italy) D-Max Racing	Ford Fiesta R5	R5	MI	(France) Quentin Gilbert	(Belgium) Renaud Jamoul	1
(Italy) D-Max Racing	Ford Fiesta R5	R5	DM	(Italy) Andrea Crugnola	(Italy) Michele Ferrara	1
(Czech Republic) Gemini Clinic Rally Team	Ford Fiesta R5	R5	MI	(France) Bryan Bouffier	(France) Denis Giraudet	1, 4
(Czech Republic) Gemini Clinic Rally Team	Ford Fiesta R5	R5	MI	(United Kingdom) Rhys Yates	(United Kingdom) Alex Lee	11–12
(Italy) BRC Racing Team	Ford Fiesta R5	R5	MI	(Italy) Giandomenico Basso	(Italy) Simone Scattolin	1
(France) Sébastien Loeb Racing	Peugeot 208 T16 R5	R5	MI	(France) Quentin Giordano	(France) Thomas Roux	1
(Finland) Printsport	Škoda Fabia R5	R5	MI	(Norway) Ole Christian Veiby	(Norway) Stig Rune Skjærmoen	2, 4, 7–8
(Finland) Printsport	Škoda Fabia R5	R5	MI	(Finland) Jari Huttunen	(Finland) Antti Linnaketo	9
(Norway) Anders Grøndal Rally Team	Ford Fiesta R5	R5	P	(Norway) Anders Grøndal	(Norway) Roger Eilertsen	2
(Norway) Adapta Motorsport AS	Ford Fiesta R5	R5	P	(Norway) Eyvind Brynildsen	(Sweden) Anders Fredriksson	2
(Norway) Adapta Motorsport AS	Ford Fiesta R5	R5	DM	(Norway) Eyvind Brynildsen	(Sweden) Anders Fredriksson	12
(Norway) Adapta Motorsport AS	Škoda Fabia R5	R5	MI	(Netherlands) Bernhard ten Brinke	(Belgium) Davy Thierie	10
(Norway) Adapta Motorsport AS	Hyundai i20 R5	R5	DM	(United Kingdom) Tom Cave	(United Kingdom) James Morgan	9
(Slovakia) Styllex Motorsport	Ford Fiesta R5	R5	DM	(United Kingdom) Tom Cave	(United Kingdom) James Morgan	12
(Slovakia) Styllex Motorsport	Škoda Fabia R5	R5	MI	(Slovakia) Martin Koči	(Czech Republic) Lukáš Kostka	4
(Slovakia) Styllex Motorsport	Škoda Fabia R5	R5	MI	(Netherlands) Edwin Schilt	(Netherlands) Lisette Bakker	10
(Poland) C-Rally	Ford Fiesta R5	R5	MI	(Poland) Jarosław Koltun	(Poland) Ireneusz Pleskot	2, 8
(Poland) C-Rally	Ford Fiesta R5	R5	MI	(United Kingdom) Matthew Wilson	(United Kingdom) Stuart Loudon	12
(Russia) Russian Performance Motorsport	Ford Fiesta R5	R5	MI	(Russia) Alexey Lukyanuk	(Russia) Alexey Arnautov	2
(Finland) Tommi Mäkinen Racing	Ford Fiesta R5	R5	MI	(Japan) Takamoto Katsuta	(Finland) Marko Salminen	2, 6–7, 9, 11
(Finland) Tommi Mäkinen Racing	Ford Fiesta R5	R5	MI	(Japan) Hiroki Arai	(Australia) Glenn MacNeall	2, 6–7, 9, 11
(Poland) Orlen Team	Škoda Fabia R5	R5	MI	(Poland) Hubert Ptaszek	(Poland) Maciek Szczepaniak	3, 5–6, 8
(United Kingdom) M-Sport World Rally Team	Ford Fiesta R5	R5	MI	(Chile) Pedro Heller	(Argentina) Pablo Olmos	3, 5–6, 8, 12
(United Kingdom) M-Sport World Rally Team	Ford Fiesta R5	R5	MI	(Finland) Kalle Rovanperä	(Finland) Jonne Halttunen	12–13
(United Kingdom) M-Sport World Rally Team	Ford Fiesta R5	R5	DM	(United Kingdom) Matt Edwards	(United Kingdom) Patrick Walsh	12
(France) Saintéloc Racing	Citroën DS3 R5	R5	MI	(France) Yohan Rossel	(France) Benoît Fulcrand	4, 6–7, 10–11
(France) Easy Rally	Citroën DS3 R5	R5	MI	(France) Laurent Pellier	(France) Benoit Neyret Gigot	4
(Paraguay) Saba Competitión	Škoda Fabia R5	R5	DM	(Paraguay) Gustavo Saba	(Argentina) Fernando Mussano	5
(Paraguay) Saba Competitión	Škoda Fabia R5	R5	DM	(Argentina) Juan Carlos Alonso	(Argentina) Matias Mercadal	5
(Paraguay) Saba Competitión	Ford Fiesta R5	R5	MI	(Spain) Cristian García	(Spain) Pablo Marcos	11
(United Kingdom) Drive DMACK Trophy Team	Ford Fiesta R5	R5	DM	(Finland) Max Vatanen	(France) Jacques-Julien Renucci	6, 12
(United Kingdom) Drive DMACK Trophy Team	Ford Fiesta R5	R5	DM	(United Kingdom) Osian Pryce	(United Kingdom) Dale Furniss	8–9
(United Kingdom) Drive DMACK Trophy Team	Ford Fiesta R5	R5	DM	(United Kingdom) Jon Armstrong	(Republic of Ireland) Noel O'Sullivan	10–11
(Portugal) AR Vidal Racing	Škoda Fabia R5	R5	MI	(Portugal) Miguel Campos	(Portugal) António Costa	6
(Poland) FF-Sport	Ford Fiesta R5	R5	P	(Poland) Wojciech Chuchała	(Poland) Sebastian Rozwadowski	8
(Poland) FF-Sport	Škoda Fabia R5	R5	DM	(United Kingdom) David Bogie	(United Kingdom) Kevin Rae	12
(Estonia) Tehase Auto	Škoda Fabia R5	R5	MI	(Estonia) Raul Jeets	(Estonia) Kuldar Sikk	8–9, 12
(Italy) S.A. Motorsport Italia Srl	Škoda Fabia R5	R5	MI	(Italy) Umberto Scandola	(Italy) Michele Ferrara	9
(Germany) Toksport World Rally Team	Škoda Fabia R5	R5	DM	(Turkey) Orhan Avcioğlu	(Turkey) Burçin Korkmaz	11–12

Key
Icon	Class
R4	Classification within Group R
R5	Classification within Group R
S	Super 2000

== Regulation changes ==
=== Sporting regulations ===
- The format of the series will change to include three events nominated by the FIA that will be compulsory for all crews competing for points. This represents a change from previous years, where competitors were free to enter as many rounds of the championship as they wished, nominating individual rounds to count as their points-scoring events. The change was introduced to address concerns over the potential for an anticlimactic championship, where the championship could be resolved without the leading crews directly competing against one another. The Rallies of Portugal, Germany and Great Britain are the compulsory events for 2017.

== Season report ==
The championship started with Andreas Mikkelsen, in a one-off outing with Škoda Motorsport after losing his WRC drive because of the Volkswagen Motorsport withdrawal from the sport, winning the Rallye Automobile Monte-Carlo by more than 3 minutes from teammate Jan Kopecký. Mikkelsen won 10 out of 15 stages, and led from start to end. The podium was completed by Monte veteran and previous winner Bryan Bouffier. Eric Camilli finished fourth in his first outing with the M-Sport World Rally Team after being demoted from the team's WRC drivers line up.

Ole Christian Veiby was the early leader of the Rally Sweden, winning the first two stages of the rally, but a push by Pontus Tidemand in which he won five of the remaining six stages of the leg 1, made him the Leader of the rally, a position he would maintain for the rest of the legs. Tidemand's victory give Škoda Motorsport the second victory of the season in a row. The Podium was completed by M-Sport World Rally Team's Teemu Suninen and Veiby.

Rally Mexico was a two-way fight between Camilli and Tidemand. By the end of Leg 2, Tidemand was on top by just 2 seconds. Nevertheless, Camilli choose wet tires for the last leg, and could not match the times of Tidemand, thus the Sweden won his second rally in a row, and give Škoda Motorsport the third out of three win in the season. The podium was completed by local and former Production World Rally Champion Benito Guerra.

Andreas Mikkelsen returned to the Škoda Motorsport's team for the Tour de Corse, and dominated the event, leading from start to finish. Teemu Suninen finished second, taking the position after his teammate Eric Camilli hit trouble in the first leg. The podium was completed by local Yohan Rossel. Mikkelsen's win was his second in as many outings.

Pontus Tidemand won the Rally Argentina by more than 10 minutes from local Juan Carlos Alonso to continue Škoda Motorsport's winning streak. Tidemand found a trouble-free weekend in one of the roughest events of the year were only five WRC-2 Crews finished the event. Benito Guerra completed the podium.

Mikkelsen returned for the Rally de Portugal and looked set to take another dominant win, only to roll his car on the very last stage of the rally whilst holding a 3 minute lead. This subsequently handed Tidemand his fourth win from six rallies, with the podium being completed by Teemu Suninen and reigning Junior WRC champion Simone Tempestini.

== Results and standings ==
=== Season summary ===
Round	Event name	Winning driver	Winning co-driver	Winning entry	Winning car	Winning time	Report
1	(Monaco) Rallye Monte Carlo	(Norway) Andreas Mikkelsen	(Norway) Anders Jæger	(Czech Republic) Škoda Motorsport	Škoda Fabia R5	4:09:36.3	Report
2	Rally Sweden	(Sweden) Pontus Tidemand	(Sweden) Jonas Andersson	(Czech Republic) Škoda Motorsport	Škoda Fabia R5	2:45:14.7	Report
3	Rally Mexico	(Sweden) Pontus Tidemand	(Sweden) Jonas Andersson	(Czech Republic) Škoda Motorsport	Škoda Fabia R5	3:32:56.5	Report
4	(France) Tour de Corse	(Norway) Andreas Mikkelsen	(Norway) Anders Jæger	(Czech Republic) Škoda Motorsport	Škoda Fabia R5	3:31:04.1	Report
5	Rally Argentina	(Sweden) Pontus Tidemand	(Sweden) Jonas Andersson	(Czech Republic) Škoda Motorsport	Škoda Fabia R5	3:55:42.7	Report
6	Rally de Portugal	(Sweden) Pontus Tidemand	(Sweden) Jonas Andersson	(Czech Republic) Škoda Motorsport	Škoda Fabia R5	3:54:17.6	Report
7	(Italy) Rally Italia Sardegna	(Czech Republic) Jan Kopecký	(Czech Republic) Pavel Dresler	(Czech Republic) Škoda Motorsport II	Škoda Fabia R5	3:36:36.5	Report
8	Rally Poland	(Norway) Ole Christian Veiby	(Norway) Stig Rune Skjærmoen	(Finland) Printsport	Škoda Fabia R5	2:53:39.3	Report
9	Rally Finland	(Finland) Jari Huttunen	(Finland) Antti Linnaketo	(Finland) Printsport	Škoda Fabia R5	2:39:30.9	Report
10	(Germany) Rallye Deutschland	(France) Eric Camilli	(France) Benjamin Veillas	(United Kingdom) M-Sport World Rally Team	Ford Fiesta R5	3:08:16.0	Report
11	(Spain) Rally Catalunya	(Finland) Teemu Suninen	(Finland) Mikko Markkula	(United Kingdom) M-Sport World Rally Team	Ford Fiesta R5	3:09:43.8	Report
12	(United Kingdom) Wales Rally GB	(Sweden) Pontus Tidemand	(Sweden) Jonas Andersson	(Czech Republic) Škoda Motorsport	Škoda Fabia R5	3:07:12.2	Report
13	Rally Australia	(Finland) Kalle Rovanperä	(Finland) Jonne Halttunen	(Finland) Kalle Rovanperä	Ford Fiesta R5	3:09:01.1	Report

=== FIA WRC2 Championship for Drivers ===
Points are awarded to the top ten classified finishers.

Position	1st	2nd	3rd	4th	5th	6th	7th	8th	9th	10th
Points	25	18	15	12	10	8	6	4	2	1

Pos.	Driver	MON (Monaco)	SWE (Sweden)	MEX (Mexico)	FRA (France)	ARG (Argentina)	POR (Portugal)	ITA (Italy)	POL (Poland)	FIN (Finland)	GER (Germany)	ESP (Spain)	GBR (United Kingdom)	AUS (Australia)	Drops	Points
1	(Sweden) Pontus Tidemand		1	1		1	1		2		3		1		15	143
2	(France) Eric Camilli	4	4	2	8		7				1		2		4	91
3	(Finland) Teemu Suninen		2		2		2				7	1	13		0	85
4	(Czech Republic) Jan Kopecký	2			7			1			2	2			0	85
5	(Norway) Ole Christian Veiby		3		5			2	1	WD	DNS		16			68
6	(Mexico) Benito Guerra			3		3	11		4		9	3	WD		0	59
7	(Romania) Simone Tempestini				4		3		10	5	6	5	20		0	56
8	(France) Quentin Gilbert	5					Ret		3	2	4				0	55
9	(Norway) Andreas Mikkelsen	1			1		Ret								0	50
10	(France) Pierre-Louis Loubet		Ret		6		10	5		7	5		8		0	39
11	(United Kingdom) Gus Greensmith		5				6		7	8	Ret	13	6		0	36
12	(United Kingdom) Tom Cave									3			3		0	30
13	(Poland) Łukasz Pieniążek				10		5	6	11		12	6	9		0	29
14	(France) Yohan Rossel				3		16	4			15	WD			0	27
15	(Finland) Kalle Rovanperä												15	1	0	25
16	(Finland) Jari Huttunen									1					0	25
17	(Finland) Juuso Nordgren									9		4	5		0	24
18	(Sweden) Emil Bergkvist	6	6		9		Ret				10		Ret		0	19
19	(Argentina) Juan Carlos Alonso					2									0	18
20	(Chile) Pedro Heller			4		Ret	8		9				18		0	18
21	(Japan) Takamoto Katsuta		9				12	3		Ret		14			0	17
22	(France) Bryan Bouffier	3			Ret										0	15
23	(United Kingdom) Osian Pryce								Ret	4					0	12
24	(Paraguay) Gustavo Saba					4									0	12
25	(Portugal) Miguel Campos						4								0	12
26	(United Kingdom) David Bogie												4		0	12
27	(Poland) Hubert Ptaszek			Ret		5	9		Ret						0	12
28	(France) Yoann Bonato	Ret			Ret		15		5		13	10	11		0	11
29	(Estonia) Raul Jeets								Ret	6			12		0	8
30	(Poland) Wojciech Chuchała								6						0	8
31	(Japan) Hiroki Arai		7				Ret	Ret		Ret		Ret			0	6
32	(Italy) Andrea Crugnola	7													0	6
33	(Spain) Cristian García											7			0	6
34	(United Kingdom) Matt Edwards												7		0	6
35	(Italy) Fabio Andolfi				WD		13	Ret	8	Ret	WD	12	10		0	5
36	(Turkey) Orhan Avcioglu											8	14		0	4
37	(Norway) Eyvind Brynildsen		8										Ret		0	4
38	(Germany) Marijan Griebel										8					4
39	(United Kingdom) Jon Armstrong										14	9			0	2
40	(Poland) Jarosław Kołtun		10						Ret						0	1
41	(Italy) Umberto Scandola									10					0	1
Pos.	Driver	MON (Monaco)	SWE (Sweden)	MEX (Mexico)	FRA (France)	ARG (Argentina)	POR (Portugal)	ITA (Italy)	POL (Poland)	FIN (Finland)	GER (Germany)	ESP (Spain)	GBR (United Kingdom)	AUS (Australia)	Drops	Points

Key
Colour	Result
Gold	Winner
Silver	2nd place
Bronze	3rd place
Green	Points finish
Blue	Non-points finish
Blue	Non-classified finish (NC)
Purple	Did not finish (Ret)
Black	Excluded (EX)
Black	Disqualified (DSQ)
White	Did not start (DNS)
White	Cancelled (C)
Blank	Withdrew entry from the event (WD)

=== FIA WRC2 Championship for Co-Drivers ===
Pos.	Co-driver	MON (Monaco)	SWE (Sweden)	MEX (Mexico)	FRA (France)	ARG (Argentina)	POR (Portugal)	ITA (Italy)	POL (Poland)	FIN (Finland)	GER (Germany)	ESP (Spain)	GBR (United Kingdom)	AUS (Australia)	Drops	Points
1	(Sweden) Jonas Andersson		1	1		1	1		2		3		1		15	143
2	(France) Benjamin Veillas	4	4	2	8		7				1		2		4	91
3	(Finland) Mikko Markkula		2		2		2				7	1	13		0	85
4	(Czech Republic) Pavel Dresler	2			7			1			2	2			0	85
5	(Norway) Stig Rune Skjærmoen		3		5			2	1	WD			16		0	68
6	(Italy) Giovanni Bernacchini				4		3		10	5	6	5	20		0	56
7	(Belgium) Renaud Jamoul	5					Ret		3	2	4				0	55
8	(Norway) Anders Jæger	1			1		Ret								0	50
9	(Spain) Daniel Cué					3	11		4		9	3			0	44
10	(France) Vincent Landais		Ret		6		10	5		7	5		8		0	39
11	(United Kingdom) Craig Parry		5				6		7	8	Ret	13	6		0	36
12	(United Kingdom) James Morgan									3			3		0	30
13	(Poland) Przemysław Mazur				10		5	6	12		12	6	9		0	29
14	(France) Benoît Fulcrand				3		16	4			15	WD			0	27
15	(Finland) Jonne Halttunen												15	1	0	25
16	(Finland) Antti Linnaketo									1					0	25
17	(Finland) Tapio Suominen											4	5		0	22
18	(Argentina) Matias Mercadal					2									0	18
19	(Argentina) Pablo Olmos			4		Ret	8		9				18		0	18
20	(Sweden) Joakim Sjöberg	6	6		9		Ret								0	18
21	(Finland) Marko Salminen		9				12	3		Ret		14			0	17
22	(France) Denis Giraudet	3			Ret										0	15
23	(Spain) Borja Rozada			3									WD		0	15
24	(United Kingdom) Dale Furniss								Ret	4					0	12
25	(Argentina) Fernando Mussano					4									0	12
26	(Portugal) António Costa						4								0	12
27	(United Kingdom) Kevin Rae												4		0	12
28	(Poland) Maciej Szczepaniak			Ret		5	9		Ret						0	12
29	(France) Benjamin Boulloud	Ret			Ret		15		5		13	10	11		0	11
30	(Estonia) Kuldar Sikk								Ret	6			12		0	8
31	(Poland) Sebastian Rozwadowski								6						0	8
32	(Italy) Michele Ferrara	7								10					0	7
33	(Australia) Glenn MacNeall		7				Ret	Ret		Ret		Ret			0	6
34	(Spain) Pablo Marcos											7			0	6
35	(United Kingdom) Patrick Walsh												7		0	6
36	(Italy) Manuel Fenoli				WD		13	Ret	8	Ret	WD				0	4
37	(Turkey) Burcin Korkmaz											8	14		0	4
38	(Sweden) Anders Fredriksson		8										Ret		0	4
39	(Republic of Ireland) Noel O'Sullivan										14	9			0	2
40	(Finland) Mikael Korhonen									9					0	2
41	(Italy) Simone Scattolin											12	10		0	1
42	(Poland) Ireneusz Pleskot		10						Ret						0	1
43	(Norway) Ola Fløene										10		Ret		0	1
Pos.	Co-driver	MON (Monaco)	SWE (Sweden)	MEX (Mexico)	FRA (France)	ARG (Argentina)	POR (Portugal)	ITA (Italy)	POL (Poland)	FIN (Finland)	GER (Germany)	ESP (Spain)	GBR (United Kingdom)	AUS (Australia)	Drops	Points

Key
Colour	Result
Gold	Winner
Silver	2nd place
Bronze	3rd place
Green	Points finish
Blue	Non-points finish
Blue	Non-classified finish (NC)
Purple	Did not finish (Ret)
Black	Excluded (EX)
Black	Disqualified (DSQ)
White	Did not start (DNS)
White	Cancelled (C)
Blank	Withdrew entry from the event (WD)

=== FIA WRC2 Championship for Teams ===
Pos.	Team	MON (Monaco)	SWE (Sweden)	MEX (Mexico)	FRA (France)	ARG (Argentina)	POR (Portugal)	ITA (Italy)	POL (Poland)	FIN (Finland)	GER (Germany)	ESP (Spain)	GBR (United Kingdom)	AUS (Australia)	Points
1	(Czech Republic) Škoda Motorsport	1	1	1	1	1	1				2		1		193
2	(United Kingdom) M-Sport World Rally Team	3	2	2	2		2				1	1	2		155
3	(Finland) Printsport		3		4			2	1	1			5		105
4	(Italy) Motorsport Italia SRL	WD		3		2	6		3		5	3	WD		81
5	(Czech Republic) Gekon Racing				3		3		5	4	3	4	10		80
6	(Czech Republic) Škoda Motorsport II							1	2			2	4		73
7	(Hungary) TRT Peugeot World Rally Team				5		4	4	6		7	5			58
8	(Norway) Adapta Motorsport AS		5							2	6		Ret		36
9	(United Kingdom) Drive DMACK Trophy Team						7		Ret	3	8	7	WD		31
10	(Finland) Tommi Mäkinen Racing		4				9	3		Ret		10			30
11	(Italy) ACI Team Italia				WD		8	Ret	4	Ret	WD	9	6		26
12	(Poland) Orlen Team			Ret		3	5		Ret						25
13	(Czech Republic) Gemini Clinic Rally Team	2			Ret							8	9		24
14	(Slovakia) Styllex Motorsport				Ret						Ret		3		15
15	(Austria) BRR Baumschlager Rally & Rally Team	Ret									4				12
16	(Poland) C-Rally		6						Ret				8		12
17	(Finland) TGS Worldwide									5					10
18	(Italy) S.A. Motorsport Italia Srl									6					8
19	(Germany) Toksport World Rally Team											6			8
20	(Estonia) Tehase Auto								Ret				7		6
Pos.	Team	MON (Monaco)	SWE (Sweden)	MEX (Mexico)	FRA (France)	ARG (Argentina)	POR (Portugal)	ITA (Italy)	POL (Poland)	FIN (Finland)	GER (Germany)	ESP (Spain)	GBR (United Kingdom)	AUS (Australia)	Points

Key
Colour	Result
Gold	Winner
Silver	2nd place
Bronze	3rd place
Green	Points finish
Blue	Non-points finish
Blue	Non-classified finish (NC)
Purple	Did not finish (Ret)
Black	Excluded (EX)
Black	Disqualified (DSQ)
White	Did not start (DNS)
White	Cancelled (C)
Blank	Withdrew entry from the event (WD)
