= 2016 Junior WRC Championship =

The 2016 FIA Junior WRC Championship was the fourth season of Junior WRC, a rallying championship governed by the Fédération Internationale de l'Automobile, running in support of the World Rally Championship.

The championship was open to drivers under the age of twenty-eight. All teams contested six nominated European events, with all of their scores counting towards their final championship position. The drivers competed in identical Citroën DS3 R3Ts with the 2014 homologated MAX Kit, using Michelin tyres. The winner received a programme of six rallies in Europe in a Citroën DS3 R5, competing in the 2017 WRC2 Championship.

== Calendar ==
The final 2016 Junior WRC calendar consisted of six European events (one less than 2015), taken from the 2016 World Rally Championship.

Round	Dates		Rally name	Rally headquarters	Surface	Stages	Distance
Round	Start	Finish	Rally name	Rally headquarters	Surface	Stages	Distance
1	20 May	22 May	Rally de Portugal	Matosinhos, Porto	Gravel	19	368 km
2	1 July	3 July	Rally Poland	Mikołajki, Warmia-Masuria	Gravel	21	306.10 km
3	29 July	31 July	Rally Finland	Jyväskylä, Keski-Suomi	Gravel	24	333.99 km
4	19 August	21 August	(Germany) Rallye Deutschland	Trier, Rhineland-Palatinate	Tarmac	18	306.80 km
5	30 September	2 October	(France) Tour de Corse	Ajaccio, Corse-du-Sud	Tarmac	10	390.92 km
6	28 October	30 October	(United Kingdom) Wales Rally GB	Deeside, Flintshire	Gravel	22	336.00 km

=== Calendar changes ===
- The total number of events will be six, one less than in 2015.
- Monte Carlo Rally and Rally de Catalunya were dropped in favor of Rallye Deutschland.

== Drivers ==
The following drivers competed in the championship.

	Drivers		Co-drivers	Rounds
(United Arab Emirates)	Mohamed Al-Mutawaa	(United Kingdom)	Stephen McAuley	1–4
(United Arab Emirates)	Mohamed Al-Mutawaa	(United Kingdom)	Stuart Loudon	5–6
(Italy)	Andrea Crugnola	(Italy)	Michele Ferrara	1–4
(France)	Vincent Dubert	(France)	Alexandre Coria	All
(France)	Terry Folb	(France)	Franck Le Floch	1–5
(France)	Frédéric Hauswald	(France)	Maxime Vilmot	1
(Namibia)	Hans Thilo Himmel	(South Africa)	Nicolaas Swartz	1–2
(Slovakia)	Martin Koči	(Czech Republic)	Lukáš Kostka	All
(France)	Romain Martel	(France)	Vanessa Lemoine	1–5
(Finland)	Juuso Nordgren	(Finland)	Mikael Korhonen	3
(France)	Laurent Pellier	(France)	Benoit Neyret-Gigot	5
(Poland)	Łukasz Pieniąźek	(Poland)	Przemisław Mazur	1–3
(France)	Yohan Rossel	(France)	Benoît Fulcrand	5–6
(Italy)	Simone Tempestini	(Italy)	Giovanni Bernacchini	All
(Norway)	Ole Christian Veiby	(Norway)	Stig Rune Skjærmoen	1–5
(France)	William Wagner	(France)	Antoine Paque	5–6

== Results and standings ==
=== Season summary ===
Round	Event name	Winning driver	Winning co-driver	Winning time	Report
1	Rally de Portugal	(Italy) Simone Tempestini	(Italy) Giovanni Bernacchini	4:30:15.7	Report
2	Rally Poland	(Italy) Simone Tempestini	(Italy) Giovanni Bernacchini	3:04:11.3	Report
3	Rally Finland	(Norway) Ole Christian Veiby	(Norway) Stig Rune Skjærmoen	2:55:40.0	Report
4	(Germany) Rallye Deutschland	(Italy) Simone Tempestini	(Italy) Giovanni Bernacchini	3:21:12.4	Report
5	(France) Tour de Corse	(France) Laurent Pellier	(France) Benoit Neyret-Gigot	4:38:19.3	Report
6	(United Kingdom) Wales Rally GB	(Slovakia) Martin Koči	(Czech Republic) Lukáš Kostka	3:47:47.4	Report

=== FIA Junior WRC Championship for Drivers ===
Points are awarded to the top ten classified finishers.

Position	1st	2nd	3rd	4th	5th	6th	7th	8th	9th	10th
Points	25	18	15	12	10	8	6	4	2	1

Pos.	Driver	POR (Portugal)	POL (Poland)	FIN (Finland)	GER (Germany)	FRA (France)	GBR (United Kingdom)	Points
1	(Italy) Simone Tempestini	1	1	2	1	4	2	123
2	(Slovakia) Martin Koči	2	DNS	7	2	3	1	82
3	(France) Vincent Dubert	4	5	4	5	6	4	64
4	(Norway) Ole Christian Veiby	5	3	1	5	7		62
5	(France) Terry Folb	3	2	Ret	3	5		58
6	(France) Romain Martel	7	4	5	4	Ret		40
7	(France) Yohan Rossel					2	3	33
8	(United Arab Emirates) Mohamed Al-Mutawaa	8	7	6	6	Ret		26
9	(France) Laurent Pellier					1		25
10	(Finland) Juuso Nordgren			3				15
11	(Poland) Łukasz Pieniążek	10	6					9
12	(France) Frédéric Hauswald	6						8
13	(Italy) Andrea Crugnola	9	Ret	Ret	WD			2
Pos.	Driver	POR (Portugal)	POL (Poland)	FIN (Finland)	GER (Germany)	FRA (France)	GBR (United Kingdom)	Points

Key
Colour	Result
Gold	Winner
Silver	2nd place
Bronze	3rd place
Green	Points finish
Blue	Non-points finish
Blue	Non-classified finish (NC)
Purple	Did not finish (Ret)
Black	Excluded (EX)
Black	Disqualified (DSQ)
White	Did not start (DNS)
White	Cancelled (C)
Blank	Withdrew entry from the event (WD)

=== FIA Junior WRC Championship for Co-Drivers ===
Pos.	Co-driver	POR (Portugal)	POL (Poland)	FIN (Finland)	GER (Germany)	FRA (France)	GBR (United Kingdom)	Points
1	(Italy) Giovanni Bernacchini	1	1	2	1	4	2	123
2	(Czech Republic) Lukáš Kostka	2	DNS	7	2	3	1	82
3	(France) Alexandre Coria	4	5	4	5	6	4	64
4	(Norway) Stig Rune Skjærmoen	5	3	1	5	7		62
5	(France) Franck Le Floch	3	2	Ret	3	5		58
6	(France) Vanessa Lemoine	7	4	5	4	Ret		40
7	(France) Benoît Fulcrand					2	3	33
8	(United Kingdom) Stephen McAuley	8	7	6	6			26
9	(France) Benoit Neyret-Gigot					1		25
10	(Finland) Mikael Korhonen			3				15
11	(Poland) Przemisław Mazur	10	6					9
12	(France) Maxime Vilmot	6						8
13	(Italy) Michele Ferrara	9	Ret	Ret	WD			2
Pos.	Co-driver	POR (Portugal)	POL (Poland)	FIN (Finland)	GER (Germany)	FRA (France)	GBR (United Kingdom)	Points

Key
Colour	Result
Gold	Winner
Silver	2nd place
Bronze	3rd place
Green	Points finish
Blue	Non-points finish
Blue	Non-classified finish (NC)
Purple	Did not finish (Ret)
Black	Excluded (EX)
Black	Disqualified (DSQ)
White	Did not start (DNS)
White	Cancelled (C)
Blank	Withdrew entry from the event (WD)

=== FIA Junior WRC Championship for Nations ===
Pos.	Country	POR (Portugal)	POL (Poland)	FIN (Finland)	GER (Germany)	FRA (France)	GBR (United Kingdom)	Points
1	Italy	1	1	2	1	3	2	126
2	France	3	2	4	3	1	3	100
3	Slovakia	2	DNS	6	2	2	1	87
4	Norway	4	3	1	5	4		74
5	United Arab Emirates	5	5	5	4	Ret		42
6	Poland	6	4					20
7	Finland			3				15
Pos.	Country	POR (Portugal)	POL (Poland)	FIN (Finland)	GER (Germany)	FRA (France)	GBR (United Kingdom)	Points

Key
Colour	Result
Gold	Winner
Silver	2nd place
Bronze	3rd place
Green	Points finish
Blue	Non-points finish
Blue	Non-classified finish (NC)
Purple	Did not finish (Ret)
Black	Excluded (EX)
Black	Disqualified (DSQ)
White	Did not start (DNS)
White	Cancelled (C)
Blank	Withdrew entry from the event (WD)
