= 2015 Junior WRC Championship =

The 2015 FIA Junior WRC Championship was the third season of Junior WRC, a rallying championship governed by the Fédération Internationale de l'Automobile, running in support of the World Rally Championship.

The championship was open to drivers under the age of twenty-eight. All teams contested six nominated European events, out of seven rounds, with all of their scores counting towards their final championship position. The drivers competed in identical Citroën DS3 R3Ts with the 2014 homologated MAX Kit, using Michelin tyres. The winner received a programme of six rallies in Europe in a Citroën DS3 R5, competing in the 2016 WRC2 Championship.

== Calendar ==
The final 2015 Junior WRC calendar consisted of seven European events (up from the six used in 2014), taken from the 2015 World Rally Championship.

Rnd.	Dates		Rally name	Rally headquarters	Surface
1	22–25 January	(Monaco)	Monte Carlo Rally	Gap, Hautes-Alpes	Mixed
2	21–24 May	(Portugal)	Rally de Portugal	Matosinhos, Porto District	Gravel
3	2–5 July	(Poland)	Rally Poland	Mikołajki, Warmia-Masuria	Gravel
4	30 July – 2 August	(Finland)	Rally Finland	Jyväskylä, Keski-Suomi	Gravel
5	1–4 October	(France)	Tour de Corse	Ajaccio, Corse-du-Sud	Tarmac
6	22–25 October	(Spain)	Rally de Catalunya	Salou, Tarragona	Mixed
7	12–15 November	(United Kingdom)	Wales Rally GB	Deeside, Flintshire	Gravel

=== Calendar changes ===
- The total number of events will be seven, one higher than in 2014. Drivers still will only be able to compete on six events.
- Rallye Deutschland was dropped in favour of the Monte Carlo Rally and the Rally de Catalunya.

== Rule changes ==
- The identical Citroën DS3 R3T provided by Citroën Racing, will be equipped with a MAX Kit that was homologated in 2014.
- With the calendar elevated to seven events (up from the six of the 2014 season), drivers will have to nominate six events in which they will be able to score points.
- The winner will receive a programme of six rallies in Europe in a Citroën DS3 R5, competing in the 2016 WRC2 Championship.

== Entries ==
The following drivers competed in the championship.

Entries
No.		Drivers		Co-drivers	Rounds
51	(France)	Charlotte Dalmasso	(France)	Marine Delon	1
51	(France)	Charlotte Dalmasso	(France)	Céline Rovira	2
51	(France)	Charlotte Dalmasso	(France)	Marion Renchet	5
52	(Italy)	Simone Tempestini	(Italy)	Matteo Chiarcossi	1–4, 6–7
53	(Norway)	Ole Christian Veiby	(Norway)	Anders Jaeger	1, 4–7
53	(Norway)	Ole Christian Veiby	(Norway)	Stig Rune Skjærmoen	2
54	(Republic of Ireland)	Daniel McKenna	(Republic of Ireland)	Andrew Grennan	1–2, 4
55	(United Arab Emirates)	Mohamed Al Mutawaa	(United Kingdom)	Stephen McAuley	2–7
56	(Italy)	Alessandro Re	(Italy)	Giacomo Ciucci	1
57	(France)	Yohan Rossel	(France)	Benoit Fulcrand	1, 5
58	(France)	Terry Folb	(France)	Franck Le Floch	1–2, 4–7
59	(Hungary)	Kornél Lukács	(Hungary)	Márk Mesterházi	1–2
60	(France)	Quentin Gilbert	(Belgium)	Renaud Jamoul	All
61	(Germany)	Christian Riedemann	(Germany)	Michael Wenzel	1
62	(Finland)	Henri Haapamäki	(Finland)	Marko Salminen	2–4
63	(Switzerland)	Fedrico Della Casa	(Italy)	Domenico Pozzi	2–6
64	(United Kingdom)	Osian Pryce	(United Kingdom)	Dale Furniss	2–3, 7
65	(France)	Pierre-Louis Loubet	(France)	Victor Bellotto	2–4
65	(France)	Pierre-Louis Loubet	(France)	Vincent Landais	5–7
66	(France)	Jean-René Perry	(France)	Joshua Reibel	2–4
66	(France)	Jean-René Perry	(France)	Christopher Guieu	5
67	(Republic of Ireland)	Dean Raftery	(Republic of Ireland)	John Higgins	2
67	(Republic of Ireland)	Dean Raftery	(Republic of Ireland)	Arthur Kierans	7
68	(France)	Matthieu Margaillan	(France)	Mathilde Margaillan	2–3
68	(France)	Matthieu Margaillan	(France)	Fabrice Gordon	4
69	(Finland)	Jari Huttunen	(Finland)	Antti Linnaketo	4
70	(France)	Jordan Berfa	(France)	Damien Augustin	5
76	(France)	Jean-Philippe Martini	(France)	Ambroise Fieschi	5
78	(United Kingdom)	Chris Ingram	(France)	Gabin Moreau	7
79	(Belgium)	William Wagner	(France)	Kevin Parent	7

== Rally summaries ==
Round	Event name	Winning driver	Winning co-driver	Winning Car	Winning time	Report
1	(Monaco) Monte Carlo Rally	(France) Quentin Gilbert	(Belgium) Renaud Jamoul	Citroën DS3 R3T	4:08:32.7	Report
2	Rally de Portugal	(France) Quentin Gilbert	(Belgium) Renaud Jamoul	Citroën DS3 R3T	4:03:52.5	Report
3	Rally Poland	(Italy) Simone Tempestini	(Italy) Matteo Chiarcossi	Citroën DS3 R3T	2:47:32.3	Report
4	Rally Finland	(France) Quentin Gilbert	(Belgium) Renaud Jamoul	Citroën DS3 R3T	2:54:43.6	Report
5	(France) Tour de Corse	(France) Quentin Gilbert	(Belgium) Renaud Jamoul	Citroën DS3 R3T	3:57:01.2	Report
6	(Spain) Rally de Catalunya	(France) Quentin Gilbert	(Belgium) Renaud Jamoul	Citroën DS3 R3T	3:45:52.6	Report
7	(United Kingdom) Wales Rally GB	(Norway) Ole Christian Veiby	(Norway) Anders Jæger	Citroën DS3 R3T	3:36:38.0	Report

== Results and standings ==
Points are awarded to the top ten classified finishers.

Position	1st	2nd	3rd	4th	5th	6th	7th	8th	9th	10th
Points	25	18	15	12	10	8	6	4	2	1

=== FIA Junior WRC Championship for Drivers ===
Pos.	Driver	MON (Monaco)	POR (Portugal)	POL (Poland)	FIN (Finland)	FRA (France)	ESP (Spain)	GBR (United Kingdom)	Points
1	(France) Quentin Gilbert	1	1	7	1	1	1		131
2	(Norway) Ole Christian Veiby	3	5		3	4	7	1	83
3	(France) Terry Folb	Ret	11		4	2	2	2	66
4	(Italy) Simone Tempestini	4	6	1	9		3	Ret	62
5	(Finland) Henri Haapamäki		3	3	2				48
6	(France) Pierre-Louis Loubet		2	Ret	Ret	Ret	5	3	43
7	(France) Jean-René Perry		4	EX	5	5			32
8	(United Arab Emirates) Mohamed Al Mutawaa		Ret	6	6	Ret	4	Ret	28
9	(Switzerland) Federico Della Casa		7	5	8	Ret	6		28
10	(France) Yohan Rossel	5				3			25
11	(Germany) Christian Riedemann	2							18
12	(United Kingdom) Osian Pryce		Ret	2					18
13	(France) Matthieu Margaillan		Ret	4	Ret				12
14	(Belgium) William Wagner							4	12
15	(Italy) Alessandro Re	6							8
16	(Hungary) Kornél Lukács	7	9						8
17	(Finland) Jari Huttunen				7				6
18	(France) Charlotte Dalmasso	8	10			Ret			5
19	(Republic of Ireland) Daniel McKenna	Ret	8		Ret				4
Pos.	Driver	MON (Monaco)	POR (Portugal)	POL (Poland)	FIN (Finland)	FRA (France)	ESP (Spain)	GBR (United Kingdom)	Points

Key
Colour	Result
Gold	Winner
Silver	2nd place
Bronze	3rd place
Green	Points finish
Blue	Non-points finish
Blue	Non-classified finish (NC)
Purple	Did not finish (Ret)
Black	Excluded (EX)
Black	Disqualified (DSQ)
White	Did not start (DNS)
White	Cancelled (C)
Blank	Withdrew entry from the event (WD)

=== FIA Junior WRC Championship for Co-Drivers ===
Pos.	Co-driver	MON (Monaco)	POR (Portugal)	POL (Poland)	FIN (Finland)	FRA (France)	ESP (Spain)	GBR (United Kingdom)	Points
1	(Belgium) Renaud Jamoul	1	1	7	1	1	1		131
2	(Norway) Anders Jæger	3			3	4	7	1	73
3	(France) Franck Le Floch	Ret	11		4	2	2	2	66
4	(Italy) Matteo Chiarcossi	4	6	1	9		3	Ret	62
5	(Finland) Marko Salminen		3	3	2				48
6	(United Kingdom) Stephen McAuley		Ret	6	6		4	Ret	28
7	(Italy) Domenico Pozzi		7	5	8		6		28
8	(France) Benoît Fulcrand	5				3			25
9	(France) Vincent Landais					Ret	5	3	25
10	(France) Joshua Reibel		4	EX	5				22
11	(Germany) Michael Wenzel	2							18
12	(United Kingdom) Dale Furniss		Ret	2					18
13	(France) Victor Bellotto		2	Ret	Ret				18
14	(France) Fabrice Gordon			4	Ret				12
15	(France) Kevin Parent							4	12
16	(Norway) Stig Rune Skjærmoen		5						10
17	(France) Christopher Guieu					5			10
18	(Italy) Giacomo Ciucci	6							8
19	(Hungary) Márk Mesterházi	7	9						8
20	(Finland) Antti Linnaketo				7				6
21	(France) Marine Delon	8							4
22	(Republic of Ireland) Andrew Grennan	Ret	8		Ret				4
23	(France) Céline Rovira		10						1
Pos.	Co-driver	MON (Monaco)	POR (Portugal)	POL (Poland)	FIN (Finland)	FRA (France)	ESP (Spain)	GBR (United Kingdom)	Points

Key
Colour	Result
Gold	Winner
Silver	2nd place
Bronze	3rd place
Green	Points finish
Blue	Non-points finish
Blue	Non-classified finish (NC)
Purple	Did not finish (Ret)
Black	Excluded (EX)
Black	Disqualified (DSQ)
White	Did not start (DNS)
White	Cancelled (C)
Blank	Withdrew entry from the event (WD)

=== FIA Junior WRC Championship for Nations ===
Pos.	Country	MON (Monaco)	POR (Portugal)	POL (Poland)	FIN (Finland)	FRA (France)	ESP (Spain)	GBR (United Kingdom)	Points
1	France	1	1	4	1	1	1	2	155
2	Norway	3	3		3	2	5	1	98
3	Italy	4	4	1	6		2	Ret	75
4	Finland		2	3	2				51
5	Switzerland		5	5	5	Ret	4		42
6	United Arab Emirates		Ret	6	4	Ret	3	Ret	35
7	United Kingdom		Ret	2				Ret	18
8	Germany	2							18
9	Hungary	5	7						16
10	Belgium	WD						4	12
11	Ireland	Ret	6		Ret			Ret	8
Pos.	Country	MON (Monaco)	POR (Portugal)	POL (Poland)	FIN (Finland)	FRA (France)	ESP (Spain)	GBR (United Kingdom)	Points

Key
Colour	Result
Gold	Winner
Silver	2nd place
Bronze	3rd place
Green	Points finish
Blue	Non-points finish
Blue	Non-classified finish (NC)
Purple	Did not finish (Ret)
Black	Excluded (EX)
Black	Disqualified (DSQ)
White	Did not start (DNS)
White	Cancelled (C)
Blank	Withdrew entry from the event (WD)
