= 2017 Rally Mexico =

2017 Rally Mexico: 14. Rally Guanajuato Mexico 2017
Round 3 of the 2017 World Rally Championship
← Previous event	Next event →
- Host country: Mexico
- Rally base: (Mexico) León, Guanajuato
- Dates run: 9 – 12 March 2017
- Stages: 19 (20) (370.45 km; 230.19 miles)
- Stage surface: Gravel

Statistics
- Crews: 24 at start, 22 at finish

Overall results
- Overall winner: (United Kingdom) Kris Meeke (Republic of Ireland) Paul Nagle (France) Citroën Total Abu Dhabi WRT

The 2017 Rally Mexico (formally known as the Rally Guanajuato Mexico 2017) was a motor racing event for rally cars that was held over four days between 9 and 12 March 2017. Kris Meeke and Paul Nagle from Citroën Total Abu Dhabi WRT won the rally.

== Entry list ==
Notable entrants
No.	Entrant	Class	Driver	Co-driver	Car	Tyre
1	(United Kingdom) M-Sport World Rally Team	WRC	(France) Sébastien Ogier	(France) Julien Ingrassia	Ford Fiesta WRC	MI
2	(United Kingdom) M-Sport World Rally Team	WRC	(Estonia) Ott Tänak	(Estonia) Martin Järveoja	Ford Fiesta WRC	MI
3	(United Kingdom) M-Sport World Rally Team	WRC	(United Kingdom) Elfyn Evans	(United Kingdom) Daniel Barritt	Ford Fiesta WRC	DM
4	(South Korea) Hyundai Motorsport	WRC	(New Zealand) Hayden Paddon	(New Zealand) John Kennard	Hyundai i20 Coupe WRC	MI
5	(South Korea) Hyundai Motorsport	WRC	(Belgium) Thierry Neuville	(Belgium) Nicolas Gilsoul	Hyundai i20 Coupe WRC	MI
6	(South Korea) Hyundai Motorsport	WRC	(Spain) Dani Sordo	(Spain) Marc Martí	Hyundai i20 Coupe WRC	MI
7	(France) Citroën Total Abu Dhabi WRT	WRC	(United Kingdom) Kris Meeke	(Republic of Ireland) Paul Nagle	Citroën C3 WRC	MI
8	(France) Citroën Total Abu Dhabi WRT	WRC	(France) Stéphane Lefebvre	(France) Gabin Moreau	Citroën C3 WRC	MI
10	(Japan) Toyota Gazoo Racing WRT	WRC	(Finland) Jari-Matti Latvala	(Finland) Miikka Anttila	Toyota Yaris WRC	MI
11	(Japan) Toyota Gazoo Racing WRT	WRC	(Finland) Juho Hänninen	(Finland) Kaj Lindström	Toyota Yaris WRC	MI
37	(United Kingdom) M-Sport World Rally Team	WRC	(Italy) Lorenzo Bertelli	(Italy) Simone Scattolin	Ford Fiesta WRC	MI
12	(Ukraine) Eurolamp World Rally Team	WRC	(Ukraine) Valeriy Gorban	(Estonia) Sergei Larens	Mini John Cooper Works WRC	MI

Key
Icon	Class
WRC	WRC entries eligible to score manufacturer points
WRC	Major entry ineligible to score manufacturer points
WRC	Registered to score points in WRC Trophy
WRC-2	Registered to take part in WRC-2 championship
WRC-3	Registered to take part in WRC-3 championship

== Classification ==
=== Event standings ===
Pos.	No.	Driver	Co-driver	Team	Car	Class	Time	Difference	Points
Overall classification
1	7	(United Kingdom) Kris Meeke	(Republic of Ireland) Paul Nagle	(France) Citroën Total Abu Dhabi WRT	Citroën C3 WRC	WRC	3:22:04.6	0.0	25
2	1	(France) Sébastien Ogier	(France) Julien Ingrassia	(United Kingdom) M-Sport World Rally Team	Ford Fiesta WRC	WRC	3:22:18.4	+13.8	22
3	5	(Belgium) Thierry Neuville	(Belgium) Nicolas Gilsoul	(South Korea) Hyundai Motorsport	Hyundai i20 Coupe WRC	WRC	3:23:04.3	+59.7	20
4	2	(Estonia) Ott Tänak	(Estonia) Martin Järveoja	(United Kingdom) M-Sport World Rally Team	Ford Fiesta WRC	WRC	3:24:22.9	+2:18.3	15
5	4	(New Zealand) Hayden Paddon	(New Zealand) John Kennard	(South Korea) Hyundai Motorsport	Hyundai i20 Coupe WRC	WRC	3:25:37.5	+3:32.9	10
6	10	(Finland) Jari-Matti Latvala	(Finland) Miikka Anttila	(Japan) Toyota Gazoo Racing WRT	Toyota Yaris WRC	WRC	3:26:44.9	+4:40.3	10
7	11	(Finland) Juho Hänninen	(Finland) Kaj Lindström	(Japan) Toyota Gazoo Racing WRT	Toyota Yaris WRC	WRC	3:27:10.8	+5:06.2	6
8	6	(Spain) Dani Sordo	(Spain) Marc Martí	(South Korea) Hyundai Motorsport	Hyundai i20 Coupe WRC	WRC	3:27:27.3	+5:22.7	5
9	3	(United Kingdom) Elfyn Evans	(United Kingdom) Daniel Barritt	(United Kingdom) M-Sport World Rally Team	Ford Fiesta WRC	WRC	3:30:46.4	+8:41.8	2
10	30	(Sweden) Pontus Tidemand	(Sweden) Jonas Andersson	(Czech Republic) Škoda Motorsport	Škoda Fabia R5	WRC-2	3:32:56.5	+10:51.9	1
WRC-2 standings
1 (10.)	30	(Sweden) Pontus Tidemand	(Sweden) Jonas Andersson	(Czech Republic) Škoda Motorsport	Škoda Fabia R5	WRC-2	3:32:56.5		25
2 (11.)	31	(France) Eric Camilli	(France) Benjamin Veillas	(United Kingdom) M-Sport World Rally Team	Ford Fiesta R5	WRC-2	3:33:39.2	+42.7	18
3 (12.)	34	(Mexico) Benito Guerra Jr.	(Spain) Borja Rozada	(Italy) Motorsport Italia	Škoda Fabia R5	WRC-2	3:40:42.6	+7:46.1	15
4 (18.)	33	(Chile) Pedro Heller	(Argentina) Pablo Olmos	(Chile) Pedro Heller	Ford Fiesta R5	WRC-2	4:34:13.6	+1:01:17.1	12

=== Special stages ===
Day	Stage	Name	Length	Winner	Car	Time	Rally leader
Leg 1	SS0	Street Stage CDMX 1	1.57 km	(Finland) Juho Hänninen	Toyota Yaris WRC	1:51.1	(Finland) Juho Hänninen
Leg 1	SS1	Street Stage CDMX 2	1.57 km	(France) Sébastien Ogier	Ford Fiesta WRC	1:44.8	(Finland) Juho Hänninen
Leg 1	SS2	El Chocolate 1	54.90 km	Stage cancelled			
Leg 1	SS3	Las Minas 1	19.68 km	Stage cancelled			
Leg 1	SS4	El Chocolate 2	54.90 km	(United Kingdom) Kris Meeke	Citroën C3 WRC	39:15.6	(United Kingdom) Kris Meeke
Leg 1	SS5	Las Minas 2	19.68 km	(Belgium) Thierry Neuville	Hyundai i20 Coupe WRC	14:12.6	(United Kingdom) Kris Meeke
Leg 1	SS6	Street Stage Guanajuato	1.09 km	(Belgium) Thierry Neuville	Hyundai i20 Coupe WRC	57.3	(United Kingdom) Kris Meeke
Leg 1	SS7	SSS Autódromo de León 1	2.30 km	(United Kingdom) Kris Meeke	Citroën C3 WRC	1:40.0	(United Kingdom) Kris Meeke
Leg 1	SS8	SSS Autódromo de León 2	2.30 km	(United Kingdom) Elfyn Evans	Ford Fiesta WRC	1:38.0	(United Kingdom) Kris Meeke
Leg 2	SS9	Media Luna 1	27.42 km	(Spain) Dani Sordo	Hyundai i20 Coupe WRC	17:01.4	(United Kingdom) Kris Meeke
Leg 2	SS10	Lajas de Oro 1	38.31 km	(Spain) Dani Sordo	Hyundai i20 Coupe WRC	28:17.5	(United Kingdom) Kris Meeke
Leg 2	SS11	El Brinco 1	10.09 km	(Belgium) Thierry Neuville (United Kingdom) Kris Meeke	Hyundai i20 Coupe WRC; Citroën C3 WRC	5:27.1	(United Kingdom) Kris Meeke
Leg 2	SS12	Media Luna 2	27.42 km	(France) Sébastien Ogier	Ford Fiesta WRC	16:44.0	(United Kingdom) Kris Meeke
Leg 2	SS13	Lajas de Oro 2	38.31 km	(United Kingdom) Kris Meeke	Citroën C3 WRC	28:10.6	(United Kingdom) Kris Meeke
Leg 2	SS14	El Brinco 2	10.09 km	(Estonia) Ott Tänak	Ford Fiesta WRC	5:22.2	(United Kingdom) Kris Meeke
Leg 2	SS15	SSS Autódromo de León 3	2.30 km	(United Kingdom) Elfyn Evans	Ford Fiesta WRC	1:37.5	(United Kingdom) Kris Meeke
Leg 2	SS16	SSS Autódromo de León 4	2.30 km	(United Kingdom) Elfyn Evans	Ford Fiesta WRC	1:38.1	(United Kingdom) Kris Meeke
Leg 2	SS17	Street Stage Feria de León	1.33 km	(France) Sébastien Ogier	Ford Fiesta WRC	1:16.9	(United Kingdom) Kris Meeke
Leg 3	SS18	La Calera	32.96 km	(United Kingdom) Kris Meeke	Citroën C3 WRC	21:53.7	(United Kingdom) Kris Meeke
Leg 3	SS19	Derramadero [Power Stage]	21.94 km	(Belgium) Thierry Neuville	Hyundai i20 Coupe WRC	12:13.9	(United Kingdom) Kris Meeke

=== Power Stage ===
The Power Stage was a 21.94 km (13.6 mi) stage at the end of the rally.

Pos.	Driver	Co-driver	Car	Time	Diff.	Pts.
1	(Belgium) Thierry Neuville	(Belgium) Nicolas Gilsoul	Hyundai i20 Coupe WRC	12:13.9		5
2	(France) Sébastien Ogier	(France) Julien Ingrassia	Ford Fiesta WRC	12:14.2	+0.3	4
3	(Estonia) Ott Tänak	(Estonia) Martin Järveoja	Ford Fiesta WRC	12:17.7	+3.8	3
4	(Finland) Jari-Matti Latvala	(Finland) Miikka Anttila	Toyota Yaris WRC	12:21.9	+8.0	2
5	(Spain) Dani Sordo	(Spain) Marc Martí	Hyundai i20 Coupe WRC	12:23.7	+9.8	1

=== Championship standings after the rally ===
Drivers' Championship standings

	Pos.	Driver	Points
1	1	(France) Sébastien Ogier	66
1	2	(Finland) Jari-Matti Latvala	58
	3	(Estonia) Ott Tänak	48
	4	(Spain) Dani Sordo	30
3	5	(Belgium) Thierry Neuville	28

Manufacturers' Championship standings

Pos.	Manufacturer	Points
1	(United Kingdom) M-Sport World Rally Team	103
2	(Japan) Toyota Gazoo Racing WRT	67
3	(South Korea) Hyundai Motorsport	65
4	(France) Citroën Total Abu Dhabi WRT	55
