= 2016 Rallye Deutschland =

Motor rally competition

2016 Rallye Deutschland: 34. ADAC Rallye Deutschland
Round 9 of the 2016 World Rally Championship
← Previous event	Next event →
- Rally base: (Germany) Trier
- Dates run: 19 – 21 August 2016
- Stages: 18 (306.80 km; 190.64 miles)
- Stage surface: Tarmac

Overall results
- Overall winner: (France) Sébastien Ogier (France) Julien Ingrassia (Germany) Volkswagen Motorsport

The 2016 Rallye Deutschland (formally the 34. ADAC Rallye Deutschland) was the ninth round of the 2016 World Rally Championship. The race was held over three days between 19 August and 21 August 2016, and was based in Trier, Germany. Volkswagen's Sébastien Ogier won the race, his 35th win in the World Rally Championship.

== Overall standings ==
Pos.	No.	Driver	Co-driver	Team	Car	Class	Time	Difference	Points
Overall classification
1	1	(France) Sébastien Ogier	(France) Julien Ingrassia	(Germany) Volkswagen Motorsport	Volkswagen Polo R WRC	WRC	3:00:26.7		26
2	4	(Spain) Dani Sordo	(Spain) Marc Martí	(Germany) Hyundai Motorsport	Hyundai i20 WRC	WRC	3:00:47.0	+20.3	18
3	3	(Belgium) Thierry Neuville	(Belgium) Nicolas Gilsoul	(Germany) Hyundai Motorsport	Hyundai i20 WRC	WRC	3:00:47.1	+20.4	18
4	9	(Norway) Andreas Mikkelsen	(Norway) Anders Jæger	(Germany) Volkswagen Motorsport II	Volkswagen Polo R WRC	WRC	3:00:53.9	+27.2	12
5	20	(New Zealand) Hayden Paddon	(New Zealand) John Kennard	(Germany) Hyundai Motorsport N	Hyundai i20 WRC	WRC	3:04:01.5	+3:34.8	10
6	5	(Norway) Mads Østberg	(Norway) Ola Fløene	(United Kingdom) M-Sport World Rally Team	Ford Fiesta RS WRC	WRC	3:04:57.9	+4:31.2	8
7	32	(Finland) Esapekka Lappi	(Finland) Janne Ferm	(Czech Republic) Škoda Motorsport	Škoda Fabia R5	WRC-2	3:09:03.5	+8:36.8	6
8	83	(Sweden) Pontus Tidemand	(Sweden) Jonas Andersson	(Czech Republic) Škoda Motorsport II	Škoda Fabia R5		3:09:19.2	+8:52.5	4
9	35	(Czech Republic) Jan Kopecký	(Czech Republic) Pavel Dresler	(Czech Republic) Škoda Motorsport	Škoda Fabia R5	WRC-2	3:10:10.9	+9:44.2	2
10	31	(Germany) Armin Kremer	(Germany) Pirmin Winklhofer	(Austria) BRR Baumschlager Rallye & Racing Team	Škoda Fabia R5	WRC-2	3:10:37.3	+10:10.6	1
48	2	(Finland) Jari-Matti Latvala	(Finland) Miikka Anttila	(Germany) Volkswagen Motorsport	Volkswagen Polo R WRC	WRC	3:37:00.0	+36:33.3	2

== Special stages ==
Day	Stage	Name	Length	Winner	Car	Time	Rally leader
Leg 1 (19 Aug)	SS1	Mittelmosel 1	22.00 km	(France) Sébastien Ogier	Volkswagen Polo R WRC	13:04.8	(France) Sébastien Ogier
Leg 1 (19 Aug)	SS2	Moselland 1	23.38 km	(Belgium) Thierry Neuville	Hyundai i20 WRC	14:32.7	(Norway) Andreas Mikkelsen
Leg 1 (19 Aug)	SS3	Mittelmosel 2	22.00 km	(Norway) Andreas Mikkelsen	Volkswagen Polo R WRC	12:57.6	(Norway) Andreas Mikkelsen
Leg 1 (19 Aug)	SS4	Moselland 2	23.38 km	(France) Sébastien Ogier	Volkswagen Polo R WRC	14:17.3	(Norway) Andreas Mikkelsen
Leg 1 (19 Aug)	SS5	SSS Ollmuth	8.21 km	(France) Sébastien Ogier	Volkswagen Polo R WRC	4:40.3	(Norway) Andreas Mikkelsen
Leg 2 (20 Aug)	SS6	Freisen - Westrich 1	14.73 km	(Norway) Andreas Mikkelsen	Volkswagen Polo R WRC	9:02.3	(Norway) Andreas Mikkelsen
Leg 2 (20 Aug)	SS7	Bosenberg 1	14.45 km	(France) Sébastien Ogier	Volkswagen Polo R WRC	7:42.6	(Norway) Andreas Mikkelsen
Leg 2 (20 Aug)	SS8	SSS Arena Panzerplatte 1	2.87 km	(France) Stéphane Lefebvre	Citroën DS3 WRC	1:48.2	(France) Sébastien Ogier
Leg 2 (20 Aug)	SS9	SSS Arena Panzerplatte 2	2.87 km	(Finland) Jari-Matti Latvala	Volkswagen Polo R WRC	1:46.4	(Norway) Andreas Mikkelsen
Leg 2 (20 Aug)	SS10	Panzerplatte Lang 1	40.80 km	(France) Sébastien Ogier	Volkswagen Polo R WRC	23:09.8	(France) Sébastien Ogier
Leg 2 (20 Aug)	SS11	Freisen - Westrich 2	14.73 km	(France) Sébastien Ogier	Volkswagen Polo R WRC	9:01.1	(France) Sébastien Ogier
Leg 2 (20 Aug)	SS12	Bosenberg 2	14.45 km	(Belgium) Thierry Neuville	Hyundai i20 WRC	7:42.9	(France) Sébastien Ogier
Leg 2 (20 Aug)	SS13	SSS Arena Panzerplatte 3	2.87 km	(Belgium) Thierry Neuville	Hyundai i20 WRC	1:48.0	(France) Sébastien Ogier
Leg 2 (20 Aug)	SS14	Panzerplatte Lang 2	40.80 km	(France) Sébastien Ogier	Volkswagen Polo R WRC	23:14.0	(France) Sébastien Ogier
Leg 3 (21 Aug)	SS15	Dhrontal 1	14.79 km	(Spain) Dani Sordo	Hyundai i20 WRC	9:27.6	(France) Sébastien Ogier
Leg 3 (21 Aug)	SS16	Sauertal 1	14.84 km	(Belgium) Thierry Neuville	Hyundai i20 WRC	7:57.5	(France) Sébastien Ogier
Leg 3 (21 Aug)	SS17	Dhrontal 2	14.79 km	Stage Interrupted			(France) Sébastien Ogier
Leg 3 (21 Aug)	SS18	Sauertal 2 (Power-Stage)	14.84 km	(Belgium) Thierry Neuville	Hyundai i20 WRC	7:54.9	(France) Sébastien Ogier

=== Power Stage ===
The "Power stage" was a 14.84 km (9.22 mi) stage at the end of the rally.

Pos	Driver	Car	Time	Diff.	Pts
1	(Belgium) Thierry Neuville	Hyundai i20 WRC	7:54.9	0.0	3
2	(Finland) Jari-Matti Latvala	Volkswagen Polo R WRC	7:57.4	+2.5	2
3	(France) Sébastien Ogier	Volkswagen Polo R WRC	7:57.5	+2.6	1
