= 2017 Rally Catalunya =

Motor rally competition

2017 Rally Catalunya: 53. RallyRACC Catalunya – Costa Daurada 2017
Round 11 of the 2017 World Rally Championship
← Previous event	Next event →
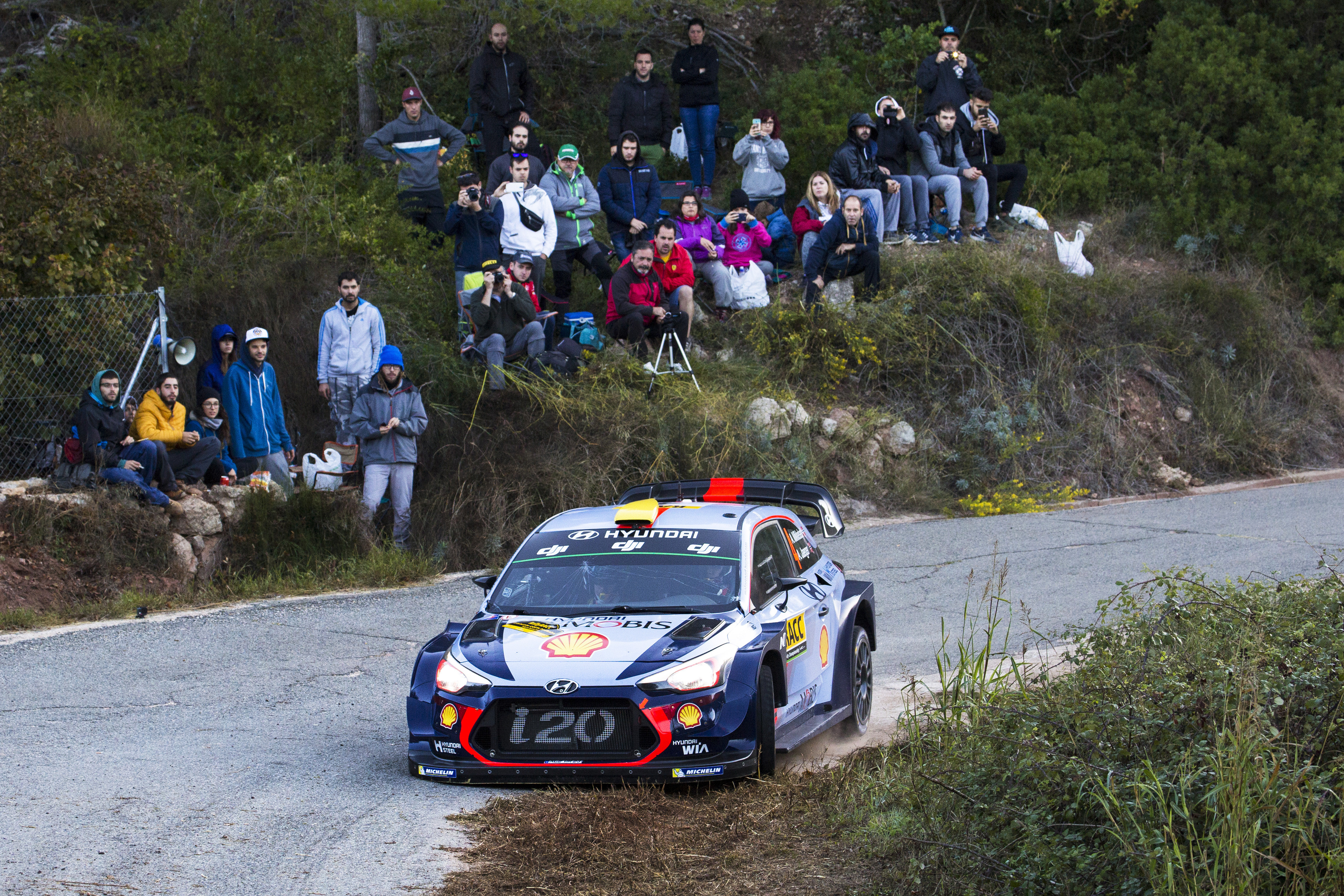
- Andreas Mikkelsen and Anders Jæger during the rally.
- Host country: Spain
- Rally base: (Spain) Salou
- Dates run: 5 – 8 October 2017
- Stages: 19 (312.02 km; 193.88 miles)
- Stage surface: Tarmac and gravel

Statistics
- Crews: 70 at start, 53 at finish

Overall results
- Overall winner: (United Kingdom) Kris Meeke (Republic of Ireland) Paul Nagle (France) Citroën Total Abu Dhabi WRT

The 2017 Rally Catalunya was the eleventh round of the 2017 World Rally Championship and was the 53rd running of the Rally de España. It was held on October 5-8, 2017 around Salou, Catalonia, Spain. The rally was won by Kris Meeke and Paul Nagle, their fifth win in the World Rally Championship and first win on tarmac.

Teemu Suninen and Mikko Markkula won the WRC-2 category, their first win of the season.

== Entry list ==
Notable entrants
No.	Entrant	Class	Driver	Co-driver	Car	Tyre
1	(United Kingdom) M-Sport World Rally Team	WRC	(France) Sébastien Ogier	(France) Julien Ingrassia	Ford Fiesta WRC	M
2	(United Kingdom) M-Sport World Rally Team	WRC	(Estonia) Ott Tänak	(Estonia) Martin Järveoja	Ford Fiesta WRC	M
3	(United Kingdom) M-Sport World Rally Team	WRC	(United Kingdom) Elfyn Evans	(United Kingdom) Daniel Barritt	Ford Fiesta WRC	D
4	(South Korea) Hyundai Motorsport	WRC	(Norway) Andreas Mikkelsen	(Norway) Anders Jæger	Hyundai i20 Coupe WRC	M
5	(South Korea) Hyundai Motorsport	WRC	(Belgium) Thierry Neuville	(Belgium) Nicolas Gilsoul	Hyundai i20 Coupe WRC	M
6	(South Korea) Hyundai Motorsport	WRC	(Spain) Dani Sordo	(Spain) Marc Martí	Hyundai i20 Coupe WRC	M
7	(France) Citroën Total Abu Dhabi WRT	WRC	(United Kingdom) Kris Meeke	(Republic of Ireland) Paul Nagle	Citroën C3 WRC	M
8	(France) Citroën Total Abu Dhabi WRT	WRC	(France) Stéphane Lefebvre	(France) Gabin Moreau	Citroën C3 WRC	M
9	(France) Citroën Total Abu Dhabi WRT	WRC	(United Arab Emirates) Khalid Al Qassimi	(United Kingdom) Chris Patterson	Citroën C3 WRC	M
10	(Japan) Toyota Gazoo Racing WRT	WRC	(Finland) Jari-Matti Latvala	(Finland) Miikka Anttila	Toyota Yaris WRC	M
11	(Japan) Toyota Gazoo Racing WRT	WRC	(Finland) Juho Hänninen	(Finland) Kaj Lindström	Toyota Yaris WRC	M
12	(Japan) Toyota Gazoo Racing WRT	WRC	(Finland) Esapekka Lappi	(Finland) Janne Ferm	Toyota Yaris WRC	M
14	(United Kingdom) M-Sport World Rally Team	WRC	(Norway) Mads Østberg	(Norway) Torstein Eriksen	Ford Fiesta WRC	M
20	(Ukraine) Eurolamp World Rally Team	WRC	(Ukraine) Valeriy Gorban	(Estonia) Sergei Larens	Mini John Cooper Works WRC	M
21	(France) Jean-Michel Raoux	WRC	(France) Jean-Michel Raoux	(France) Laurent Magat	Citroën DS3 WRC	D
22	(Greece) Jourdan Serderidis	WRC	(Greece) Jourdan Serderidis	(Belgium) Frédéric Miclotte	Citroën DS3 WRC	M

Key
Icon	Class
WRC	WRC entries eligible to score manufacturer points
WRC	Major entry ineligible to score manufacturer points
WRC	Registered to score points in WRC Trophy
WRC-2	Registered to take part in WRC-2 championship

== Classification ==
=== Event standings ===
Pos.	No.	Driver	Co-driver	Team	Car	Class	Time	Difference	Points
Overall classification
1	7	(United Kingdom) Kris Meeke	(Republic of Ireland) Paul Nagle	(France) Citroën Total Abu Dhabi WRT	Citroën C3 WRC	WRC	3:01:21.1	0.0	29
2	1	(France) Sébastien Ogier	(France) Julien Ingrassia	(United Kingdom) M-Sport World Rally Team	Ford Fiesta WRC	WRC	3:01:49.1	+28.0	21
3	2	(Estonia) Ott Tänak	(Estonia) Martin Järveoja	(United Kingdom) M-Sport World Rally Team	Ford Fiesta WRC	WRC	3:01:54.1	+33.0	17
4	11	(Finland) Juho Hänninen	(Finland) Kaj Lindström	(Japan) Toyota Gazoo Racing WRT	Toyota Yaris WRC	WRC	3:02:15.2	+54.1	13
5	14	(Norway) Mads Østberg	(Norway) Torstein Eriksen	(United Kingdom) M-Sport World Rally Team	Ford Fiesta WRC	WRC	3:03:47.3	+2:26.2	10
6	8	(France) Stéphane Lefebvre	(France) Gabin Moreau	(France) Citroën Total Abu Dhabi WRT	Citroën C3 WRC	WRC	3:04:04.1	+2:43.0	8
7	3	(United Kingdom) Elfyn Evans	(United Kingdom) Daniel Barritt	(United Kingdom) M-Sport World Rally Team	Ford Fiesta WRC	WRC	3:05:58.5	+4:37.4	6
8	32	(Finland) Teemu Suninen	(Finland) Mikko Markkula	(United Kingdom) M-Sport World Rally Team	Ford Fiesta R5	WRC-2	3:09:43.8	+8:22.7	4
9	31	(Czech Republic) Jan Kopecký	(Czech Republic) Pavel Dresler	(Czech Republic) Škoda Motorsport II	Škoda Fabia R5	WRC-2	3:10:15.6	+8:54.5	2
10	83	(Norway) Ole Christian Veiby	(Norway) Stig Rune Skjærmoen	(Finland) Printsport	Škoda Fabia R5		3:10:25.9	+9:04.8	1
15	6	(Spain) Dani Sordo	(Spain) Marc Martí	(South Korea) Hyundai Motorsport	Hyundai i20 Coupe WRC	WRC	3:15:40.4	+14:19.3	5
WRC-2 standings
1 (8.)	32	(Finland) Teemu Suninen	(Finland) Mikko Markkula	(United Kingdom) M-Sport World Rally Team	Ford Fiesta R5	WRC-2	3:09:43.8	0.0	25
2 (9.)	31	(Czech Republic) Jan Kopecký	(Czech Republic) Pavel Dresler	(Czech Republic) Škoda Motorsport II	Škoda Fabia R5	WRC-2	3:10:15.6	+31.8	18
3 (12.)	34	(Mexico) Benito Guerra	(Spain) Daniel Cué	(Italy) Motorsport Italia SRL	Škoda Fabia R5	WRC-2	3:14:22.7	+4:38.9	15

=== Special stages ===
Day	Stage	Name	Length	Winner	Car	Time	Rally Leader
Leg 1	SS1	Caseres 1 (gravel)	12.50 km	(Estonia) Ott Tänak	Ford Fiesta WRC	7:16.7	(Estonia) Ott Tänak
Leg 1	SS2	Bot 1 (gravel)	6.50 km	(United Kingdom) Kris Meeke	Citroën C3 WRC	4:04.5	(Estonia) Ott Tänak
Leg 1	SS3	Terra Alta 1 (gravel & tarmac)	38.95 km	(Norway) Andreas Mikkelsen	Hyundai i20 Coupe WRC	24:55.0	(Norway) Andreas Mikkelsen
Leg 1	SS4	Caseres 2 (gravel)	12.50 km	(Finland) Jari-Matti Latvala	Toyota Yaris WRC	7:08.1	(Norway) Mads Østberg
Leg 1	SS5	Bot 2 (gravel)	6.50 km	(United Kingdom) Kris Meeke	Citroën C3 WRC	3:57.7	(Norway) Andreas Mikkelsen
Leg 1	SS6	Terra Alta 2 (gravel & tarmac)	38.95 km	(France) Sébastien Ogier	Ford Fiesta WRC	24:18.9	(Norway) Andreas Mikkelsen
Leg 2	SS7	El Montmell 1 (tarmac)	24.40 km	(United Kingdom) Kris Meeke	Citroën C3 WRC	12:22.0	(United Kingdom) Kris Meeke
Leg 2	SS8	El Pont d'Armentera 1 (tarmac)	21.29 km	(Finland) Juho Hänninen	Toyota Yaris WRC	10:54.6	(United Kingdom) Kris Meeke
Leg 2	SS9	Savallà 1 (tarmac)	14.12 km	(Finland) Juho Hänninen	Toyota Yaris WRC	7:25.3	(United Kingdom) Kris Meeke
Leg 2	SS10	El Montmell 2 (tarmac)	24.40 km	(Belgium) Thierry Neuville	Hyundai i20 Coupe WRC	12:25.3	(United Kingdom) Kris Meeke
Leg 2	SS11	El Pont d'Armentera 2 (tarmac)	21.29 km	(France) Sébastien Ogier	Ford Fiesta WRC	10:59.6	(United Kingdom) Kris Meeke
Leg 2	SS12	Savallà 2 (tarmac)	14.12 km	(France) Sébastien Ogier	Ford Fiesta WRC	7:30.0	(United Kingdom) Kris Meeke
Leg 2	SS13	Salou (tarmac)	2.24 km	(France) Sébastien Ogier	Ford Fiesta WRC	2:33.8	(United Kingdom) Kris Meeke
Leg 3	SS14	L'Albiol 1 (tarmac)	6.28 km	(United Kingdom) Kris Meeke	Citroën C3 WRC	4:00.9	(United Kingdom) Kris Meeke
Leg 3	SS15	Riudecanyes 1 (tarmac)	16.35 km	(United Kingdom) Kris Meeke	Citroën C3 WRC	10:20.2	(United Kingdom) Kris Meeke
Leg 3	SS16	Santa Marina 1 (tarmac)	14.50 km	(United Kingdom) Kris Meeke	Citroën C3 WRC	8:09.5	(United Kingdom) Kris Meeke
Leg 3	SS17	L'Albiol 2 (tarmac)	6.28 km	(United Kingdom) Kris Meeke	Citroën C3 WRC	3:58.6	(United Kingdom) Kris Meeke
Leg 3	SS18	Riudecanyes 2 (tarmac)	16.35 km	(United Kingdom) Kris Meeke	Citroën C3 WRC	10:19.5	(United Kingdom) Kris Meeke
Leg 3	SS19	Santa Marina 2 (tarmac) [Power Stage]	14.50 km	(Spain) Dani Sordo	Hyundai i20 Coupe WRC	8:07.8	(United Kingdom) Kris Meeke

=== Power Stage ===
The Power Stage was a 14.50 km (9.0 mi) stage at the end of the rally.

Pos.	Driver	Co-driver	Car	Time	Diff.	Pts.
1	(Spain) Dani Sordo	(Spain) Marc Martí	Hyundai i20 Coupe WRC	8:07.8		5
2	(United Kingdom) Kris Meeke	(Republic of Ireland) Paul Nagle	Citroën C3 WRC	8:11.3	+3.5	4
3	(France) Sébastien Ogier	(France) Julien Ingrassia	Ford Fiesta WRC	8:12.0	+4.2	3
4	(Estonia) Ott Tänak	(Estonia) Martin Järveoja	Ford Fiesta WRC	8:12.6	+4.8	2
5	(Finland) Juho Hänninen	(Finland) Kaj Lindström	Toyota Yaris WRC	8:14.6	+6.8	1

=== Championship standings after the rally ===
Drivers' Championship standings

	Pos.	Driver	Points
	1	(France) Sébastien Ogier	198
1	2	(Estonia) Ott Tänak	161
1	3	(Belgium) Thierry Neuville	160
	4	(Finland) Jari-Matti Latvala	123
	5	(Spain) Dani Sordo	94

Manufacturers' Championship standings

Pos.	Manufacturer	Points
1	(United Kingdom) M-Sport World Rally Team	358
2	(South Korea) Hyundai Motorsport	275
3	(Japan) Toyota Gazoo Racing WRT	225
4	(France) Citroën Total Abu Dhabi WRT	198
