= 2017 Rallye Deutschland =

Motor rally competition

2017 Rallye Deutschland: 35. ADAC Rallye Deutschland 2017
Round 10 of the 2017 World Rally Championship
← Previous event	Next event →
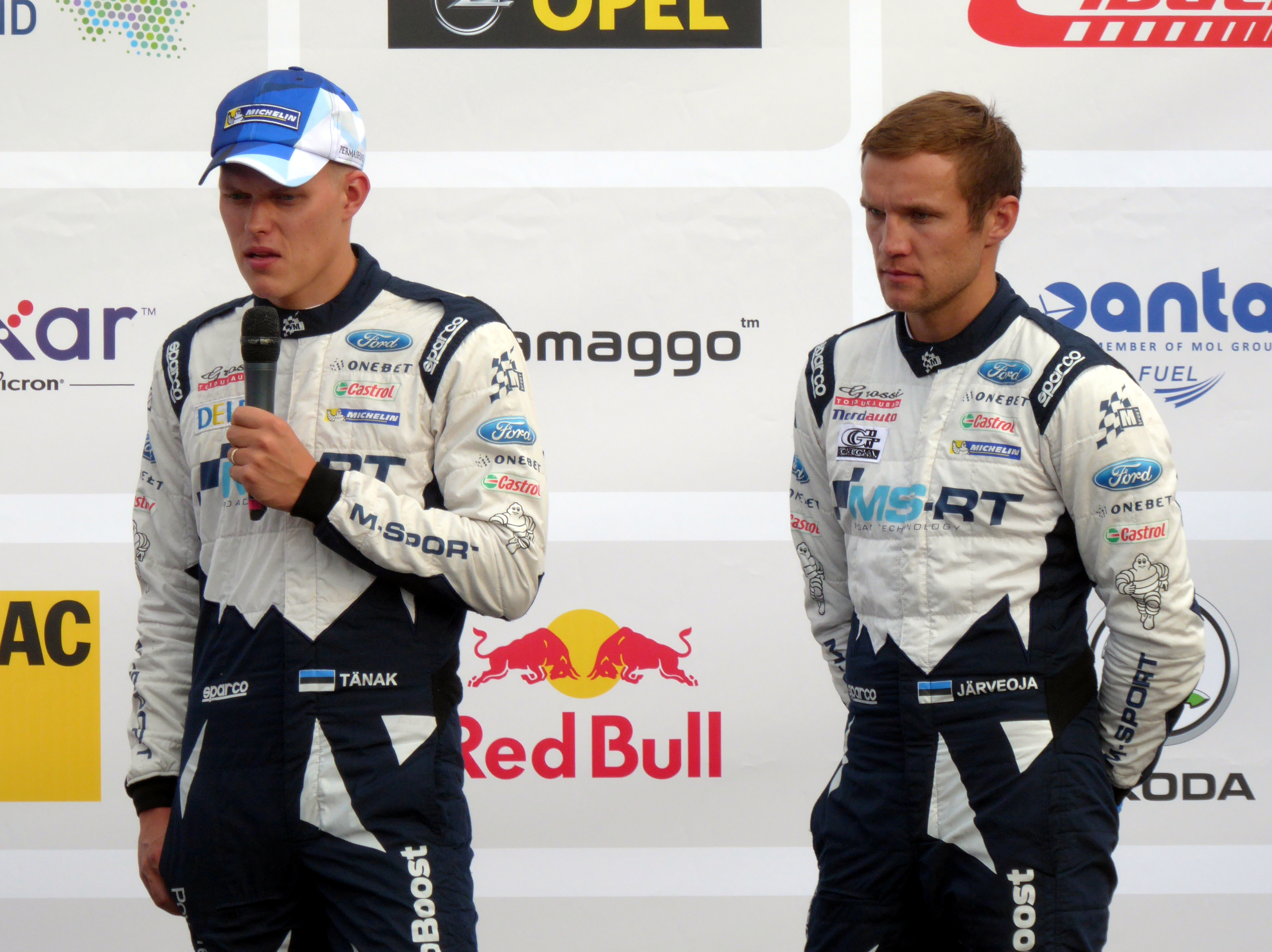
- Rally winners Tänak and Järveoja
- Host country: Germany
- Rally base: (Germany) Saarbrücken
- Dates run: 17 – 20 August 2017
- Stages: 21 (309.17 km; 192.11 miles)
- Stage surface: Tarmac

Statistics
- Crews: 62 at start, 54 at finish

Overall results
- Overall winner: (Estonia) Ott Tänak (Estonia) Martin Järveoja (United Kingdom) M-Sport World Rally Team

The 2017 Rallye Deutschland was the tenth round of the 2017 World Rally Championship and was the 35th running of the Rallye Deutschland. The rally was won by Ott Tänak and Martin Järveoja, their second win in the World Rally Championship.

Eric Camilli and Benjamin Veillas won the WRC-2 category, their first success in the series. Pontus Tidemand and Jonas Andersson finished third which was enough to secure the title, as well as the constructors' title for Škoda Motorsport, in WRC-2.

== Entry list ==
Notable entrants
No.	Entrant	Class	Driver	Co-driver	Car	Tyre
1	(United Kingdom) M-Sport World Rally Team	WRC	(France) Sébastien Ogier	(France) Julien Ingrassia	Ford Fiesta WRC	M
2	(United Kingdom) M-Sport World Rally Team	WRC	(Estonia) Ott Tänak	(Estonia) Martin Järveoja	Ford Fiesta WRC	M
3	(United Kingdom) M-Sport World Rally Team	WRC	(United Kingdom) Elfyn Evans	(United Kingdom) Daniel Barritt	Ford Fiesta WRC	D
4	(South Korea) Hyundai Motorsport	WRC	(New Zealand) Hayden Paddon	(United Kingdom) Sebastian Marshall	Hyundai i20 Coupe WRC	M
5	(South Korea) Hyundai Motorsport	WRC	(Belgium) Thierry Neuville	(Belgium) Nicolas Gilsoul	Hyundai i20 Coupe WRC	M
6	(South Korea) Hyundai Motorsport	WRC	(Spain) Dani Sordo	(Spain) Marc Martí	Hyundai i20 Coupe WRC	M
7	(France) Citroën Total Abu Dhabi WRT	WRC	(United Kingdom) Kris Meeke	(Republic of Ireland) Paul Nagle	Citroën C3 WRC	M
8	(France) Citroën Total Abu Dhabi WRT	WRC	(Republic of Ireland) Craig Breen	(United Kingdom) Scott Martin	Citroën C3 WRC	M
9	(France) Citroën Total Abu Dhabi WRT	WRC	(Norway) Andreas Mikkelsen	(Norway) Anders Jæger	Citroën C3 WRC	M
10	(Japan) Toyota Gazoo Racing WRT	WRC	(Finland) Jari-Matti Latvala	(Finland) Miikka Anttila	Toyota Yaris WRC	M
11	(Japan) Toyota Gazoo Racing WRT	WRC	(Finland) Juho Hänninen	(Finland) Kaj Lindström	Toyota Yaris WRC	M
12	(Japan) Toyota Gazoo Racing WRT	WRC	(Finland) Esapekka Lappi	(Finland) Janne Ferm	Toyota Yaris WRC	M
14	(United Kingdom) M-Sport World Rally Team	WRC	(Germany) Armin Kremer	(Germany) Pirmin Winklhofer	Ford Fiesta WRC	M
22	(France) Jean-Michel Raoux	WRC	(France) Jean-Michel Raoux	(France) Laurent Magat	Citroën DS3 WRC	D
23	(Greece) Jourdan Serderidis	WRC	(Greece) Jourdan Serderidis	(Belgium) Frédéric Miclotte	Citroën DS3 WRC	M

Key
Icon	Class
WRC	WRC entries eligible to score manufacturer points
WRC	Major entry ineligible to score manufacturer points
WRC	Registered to score points in WRC Trophy
WRC-2	Registered to take part in WRC-2 championship
WRC-3	Registered to take part in WRC-3 championship

== Classification ==
=== Event standings ===
Pos.	No.	Driver	Co-driver	Team	Car	Class	Time	Difference	Points
Overall classification
1	2	(Estonia) Ott Tänak	(Estonia) Martin Järveoja	(United Kingdom) M-Sport World Rally Team	Ford Fiesta WRC	WRC	2:57:31.7	0.0	25
2	7	(Norway) Andreas Mikkelsen	(Norway) Anders Jæger	(France) Citroën Total Abu Dhabi WRT	Citroën C3 WRC	WRC	2:57:48.1	+16.4	18
3	1	(France) Sébastien Ogier	(France) Julien Ingrassia	(United Kingdom) M-Sport World Rally Team	Ford Fiesta WRC	WRC	2:58:02.1	+30.4	17
4	11	(Finland) Juho Hänninen	(Finland) Kaj Lindström	(Japan) Toyota Gazoo Racing WRT	Toyota Yaris WRC	WRC	2:59:20.9	+1:49.2	12
5	9	(Republic of Ireland) Craig Breen	(United Kingdom) Scott Martin	(France) Citroën Total Abu Dhabi WRT	Citroën C3 WRC	WRC	2:59:33.2	+2:01.5	11
6	3	(United Kingdom) Elfyn Evans	(United Kingdom) Daniel Barritt	(United Kingdom) M-Sport World Rally Team	Ford Fiesta WRC	WRC	2:59:35.1	+2:03.4	8
7	10	(Finland) Jari-Matti Latvala	(Finland) Miikka Anttila	(Japan) Toyota Gazoo Racing WRT	Toyota Yaris WRC	WRC	3:01:29.9	+3:58.2	9
8	4	(New Zealand) Hayden Paddon	(United Kingdom) Sebastian Marshall	(South Korea) Hyundai Motorsport	Hyundai i20 Coupe WRC	WRC	3:02:04.1	+4:32.4	4
9	14	(Germany) Armin Kremer	(Germany) Pirmin Winklhofer	(United Kingdom) M-Sport World Rally Team	Ford Fiesta WRC	WRC	3:07:51.1	+10:19.4	2
10	39	(France) Eric Camilli	(France) Benjamin Veillas	(United Kingdom) M-Sport World Rally Team	Ford Fiesta R5	WRC-2	3:08:16.0	+10:44.3	1
21	12	(Finland) Esapekka Lappi	(Finland) Janne Ferm	(Japan) Toyota Gazoo Racing WRT	Toyota Yaris WRC	WRC	3:15:36.9	+18:05.2	4
34	6	(Spain) Dani Sordo	(Spain) Marc Martí	(South Korea) Hyundai Motorsport	Hyundai i20 Coupe WRC	WRC	3:32:50.7	+35:19.0	5
WRC-2 standings
1 (10.)	39	(France) Eric Camilli	(France) Benjamin Veillas	(United Kingdom) M-Sport World Rally Team	Ford Fiesta R5	WRC-2	3:08:16.0	0.0	25
2 (11.)	34	(Czech Republic) Jan Kopecký	(Czech Republic) Pavel Dresler	(Czech Republic) Škoda Motorsport	Škoda Fabia R5	WRC-2	3:09:04.1	+48.1	18
3 (12.)	32	(Sweden) Pontus Tidemand	(Sweden) Jonas Andersson	(Czech Republic) Škoda Motorsport	Škoda Fabia R5	WRC-2	3:10:06.7	+1:50.7	15

=== Special stages ===
Day	Stage	Name	Length	Winner	Car	Time	Rally Leader
Leg 1	SS1	SSS Saarbrücken	2.05 km	(Czech Republic) Jan Kopecký	Škoda Fabia R5	2:05.9	(Czech Republic) Jan Kopecký
Leg 1	SS2	SSS Wadern-Weiskirchen 1	9.27 km	(Spain) Dani Sordo	Hyundai i20 Coupe WRC	5:12.2	(Spain) Dani Sordo
Leg 1	SS3	Mittelmosel 1	22.00 km	(Estonia) Ott Tänak	Ford Fiesta WRC	13:00.3	(Estonia) Ott Tänak
Leg 1	SS4	Grafschaft 1	18.35 km	(Norway) Andreas Mikkelsen	Citroën C3 WRC	10:50.3	(Norway) Andreas Mikkelsen
Leg 1	SS5	SSS Wadern-Weiskirchen 2	9.27 km	(Belgium) Thierry Neuville	Hyundai i20 Coupe WRC	5:15.9	(Norway) Andreas Mikkelsen
Leg 1	SS6	Mittelmosel 2	22.00 km	(Estonia) Ott Tänak	Ford Fiesta WRC	13:31.5	(Norway) Andreas Mikkelsen
Leg 1	SS7	Grafschaft 2	18.35 km	(Estonia) Ott Tänak	Ford Fiesta WRC	11:15.4	(Estonia) Ott Tänak
Leg 1	SS8	SSS Wadern-Weiskirchen 3	9.27 km	(Finland) Jari-Matti Latvala	Toyota Yaris WRC	5:54.9	(Estonia) Ott Tänak
Leg 2	SS9	SSS Arena Panzerplatte 1	2.87 km	(Estonia) Ott Tänak	Ford Fiesta WRC	1:45.5	(Estonia) Ott Tänak
Leg 2	SS10	Panzerplatte 1	41.97 km	(Finland) Juho Hänninen	Toyota Yaris WRC	24:39.7	(Estonia) Ott Tänak
Leg 2	SS11	Freisen 1	14.78 km	(Estonia) Ott Tänak	Ford Fiesta WRC	8:59.9	(Estonia) Ott Tänak
Leg 2	SS12	Römerstraße 1	12.28 km	(Norway) Andreas Mikkelsen	Citroën C3 WRC	6:13.9	(Estonia) Ott Tänak
Leg 2	SS13	SSS Arena Panzerplatte 2	2.87 km	(Spain) Dani Sordo	Hyundai i20 Coupe WRC	1:43.3	(Estonia) Ott Tänak
Leg 2	SS14	SSS Arena Panzerplatte 3	2.87 km	(Spain) Dani Sordo	Hyundai i20 Coupe WRC	1:43.4	(Estonia) Ott Tänak
Leg 2	SS15	Panzerplatte 2	41.97 km	(Spain) Dani Sordo	Hyundai i20 Coupe WRC	23:52.0	(Estonia) Ott Tänak
Leg 2	SS16	Freisen 2	14.78 km	(France) Sébastien Ogier	Ford Fiesta WRC	8:44.8	(Estonia) Ott Tänak
Leg 2	SS17	Römerstraße 2	12.28 km	(Finland) Jari-Matti Latvala	Toyota Yaris WRC	6:12.0	(Estonia) Ott Tänak
Leg 3	SS18	Losheim am See 1	13.02 km	(Finland) Juho Hänninen	Toyota Yaris WRC	6:32.0	(Estonia) Ott Tänak
Leg 3	SS19	St. Wendeler Land 1	12.95 km	(Finland) Esapekka Lappi	Toyota Yaris WRC	6:22.5	(Estonia) Ott Tänak
Leg 3	SS20	Losheim am See 2	13.02 km	(Republic of Ireland) Craig Breen	Citroën C3 WRC	6:29.4	(Estonia) Ott Tänak
Leg 3	SS21	St. Wendeler Land 2 [Power Stage]	12.95 km	(Spain) Dani Sordo	Hyundai i20 Coupe WRC	6:17.3	(Estonia) Ott Tänak

=== Power Stage ===
The Power Stage was a 12.95 km (8.0 mi) stage at the end of the rally.

Pos.	Driver	Co-driver	Car	Time	Diff.	Pts.
1	(Spain) Dani Sordo	(Spain) Marc Martí	Hyundai i20 Coupe WRC	6:17.3		5
2	(Finland) Esapekka Lappi	(Finland) Janne Ferm	Toyota Yaris WRC	6:17.5	+0.2	4
3	(Finland) Jari-Matti Latvala	(Finland) Miikka Anttila	Toyota Yaris WRC	6:19.9	+2.6	3
4	(France) Sébastien Ogier	(France) Julien Ingrassia	Ford Fiesta WRC	6:20.0	+2.7	2
5	(Republic of Ireland) Craig Breen	(United Kingdom) Scott Martin	Citroën C3 WRC	6:20.2	+2.9	1

=== Championship standings after the rally ===
Drivers' Championship standings

	Pos.	Driver	Points
1	1	(France) Sébastien Ogier	177
1	2	(Belgium) Thierry Neuville	160
	3	(Estonia) Ott Tänak	144
	4	(Finland) Jari-Matti Latvala	123
	5	(Spain) Dani Sordo	89

Manufacturers' Championship standings

Pos.	Manufacturer	Points
1	(United Kingdom) M-Sport World Rally Team	325
2	(South Korea) Hyundai Motorsport	261
3	(Japan) Toyota Gazoo Racing WRT	213
4	(France) Citroën Total Abu Dhabi WRT	163
