= 2017 Rally Australia =

13th and final round of the 2017 World Rally Championship

2017 Rally Australia: 26. Kennards Hire Rally Australia 2017
Round 13 of the 2017 World Rally Championship
← Previous event
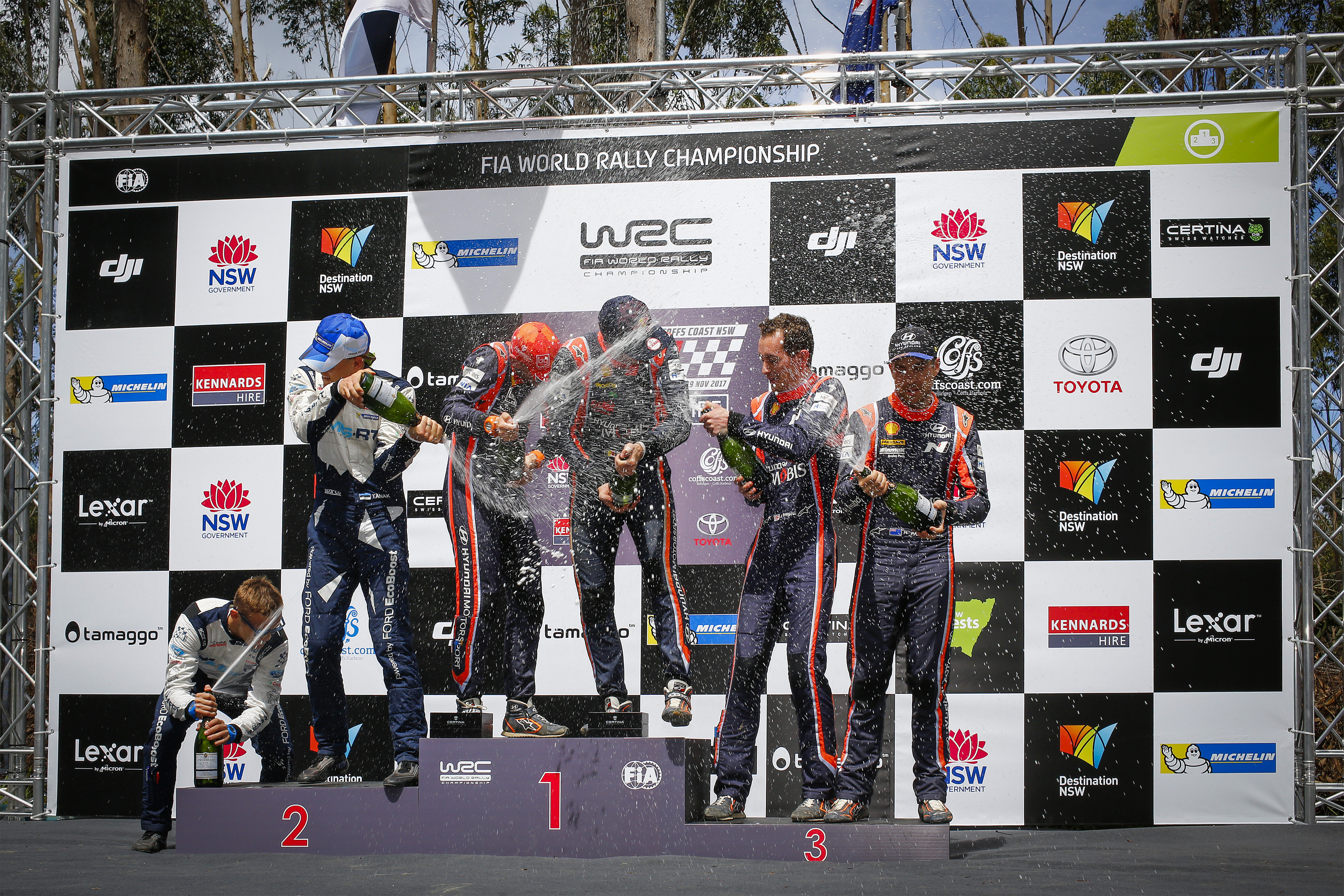
- Top 3 crews on the podium
- Host country: Australia
- Rally base: (Australia) Coffs Harbour, New South Wales
- Dates run: 17 – 19 November 2017
- Stages: 21 (318.16 km; 197.70 miles)
- Stage surface: Gravel

Statistics
- Crews: 33 at start, 25 at finish

Overall results
- Overall winner: (Belgium) Thierry Neuville (Belgium) Nicolas Gilsoul (South Korea) Hyundai Motorsport

The 2017 Rally Australia (formally the 26. Kennards Hire Rally Australia 2017) was the 13th and final round of the 2017 World Rally Championship. The rally was held over three days between 17 November and 19 November 2017, and was based in Coffs Harbour, Australia. Thierry Neuville and Nicolas Gilsoul were the rally winners.

== Entry list ==
Notable entrants
No.	Entrant	Class	Driver	Co-driver	Car	Tyre
1	(United Kingdom) M-Sport World Rally Team	WRC	(France) Sébastien Ogier	(France) Julien Ingrassia	Ford Fiesta WRC	MI
2	(United Kingdom) M-Sport World Rally Team	WRC	(Estonia) Ott Tänak	(Estonia) Martin Järveoja	Ford Fiesta WRC	MI
3	(United Kingdom) M-Sport World Rally Team	WRC	(United Kingdom) Elfyn Evans	(United Kingdom) Daniel Barritt	Ford Fiesta WRC	DM
4	(South Korea) Hyundai Motorsport	WRC	(New Zealand) Hayden Paddon	(United Kingdom) Sebastian Marshall	Hyundai i20 Coupe WRC	MI
5	(South Korea) Hyundai Motorsport	WRC	(Belgium) Thierry Neuville	(Belgium) Nicolas Gilsoul	Hyundai i20 Coupe WRC	MI
6	(South Korea) Hyundai Motorsport	WRC	(Norway) Andreas Mikkelsen	(Norway) Anders Jæger	Hyundai i20 Coupe WRC	MI
7	(France) Citroën Total Abu Dhabi WRT	WRC	(France) Stéphane Lefebvre	(France) Gabin Moreau	Citroën C3 WRC	MI
8	(France) Citroën Total Abu Dhabi WRT	WRC	(Republic of Ireland) Craig Breen	(United Kingdom) Scott Martin	Citroën C3 WRC	MI
9	(France) Citroën Total Abu Dhabi WRT	WRC	(United Kingdom) Kris Meeke	(Republic of Ireland) Paul Nagle	Citroën C3 WRC	MI
10	(Japan) Toyota Gazoo Racing WRT	WRC	(Finland) Jari-Matti Latvala	(Finland) Miikka Anttila	Toyota Yaris WRC	MI
11	(Japan) Toyota Gazoo Racing WRT	WRC	(Finland) Esapekka Lappi	(Finland) Janne Ferm	Toyota Yaris WRC	MI
21	(Greece) Jourdan Serderidis	WRC	(Greece) Jourdan Serderidis	(Belgium) Frédéric Miclotte	Citroën DS3 WRC	MI
31	(Finland) Kalle Rovanperä	WRC-2	(Finland) Kalle Rovanperä	(Finland) Jonne Halttunen	Ford Fiesta R5	MI

Key
Icon	Class
WRC	WRC entries eligible to score manufacturer points
WRC	Registered to score points in WRC Trophy
WRC-2	Registered to take part in WRC-2 championship

== Classification ==
=== Event standings ===
Pos.	No.	Driver	Co-driver	Entrant	Car	Class	Time	Difference	
Pos.	No.	Driver	Co-driver	Entrant	Car	Class	Time	to 1st	to prev.
1	5	(Belgium) Thierry Neuville	(Belgium) Nicolas Gilsoul	(South Korea) Hyundai Motorsport	Hyundai i20 Coupe WRC	**WRC**	2:35:44.8	0.0	0.0
2	2	(Estonia) Ott Tänak	(Estonia) Martin Järveoja	(United Kingdom) M-Sport World Rally Team	Ford Fiesta WRC	**WRC**	2:36:07.3	+22.5	+22.5
3	4	(New Zealand) Hayden Paddon	(United Kingdom) Sebastian Marshall	(South Korea) Hyundai Motorsport	Hyundai i20 Coupe WRC	**WRC**	2:36:43.9	+59.1	+36.6
4	1	(France) Sébastien Ogier	(France) Julien Ingrassia	(United Kingdom) M-Sport World Rally Team	Ford Fiesta WRC	**WRC**	2:38:12.5	+2:27.7	+1:28.6
5	3	(United Kingdom) Elfyn Evans	(United Kingdom) Daniel Barritt	(United Kingdom) M-Sport World Rally Team	Ford Fiesta WRC	**WRC**	2:38:50.4	+3:05.6	+37.9
6	11	(Finland) Esapekka Lappi	(Finland) Janne Ferm	(Japan) Toyota Gazoo Racing WRT	Toyota Yaris WRC	**WRC**	2:39:34.3	+3:49.5	+43.9
7	9	(United Kingdom) Kris Meeke	(Republic of Ireland) Paul Nagle	(France) Citroën Total Abu Dhabi WRT	Citroën C3 WRC	**WRC**	2:58:43.2	+22:58.4	+19:08.9
8	68	(Australia) Nathan Quinn	(Australia) Ben Searcy	(Australia) Nathan Quinn	Mitsubishi Lancer Evo IX	—N/a	3:00:48.2	+25:03.4	+2:05.0
9	61	(Australia) Richie Dalton	(Australia) John Allen	(Australia) Richie Dalton	Škoda Fabia R5	WRC-2	3:01:24.4	+25:39.6	+36.2
10	71	(Australia) Dean Herridge	(Australia) Samuel Hill	(Australia) Dean Herridge	Subaru Impreza STI	—N/a	3:05:37.1	+29:52.3	+4:12.7

=== Special stages ===
Day	Stage	Name	Length	Winner	Car	Time	Rally Leader
Leg 1	SS1	Pilbara 1	9.71 km	(Norway) Andreas Mikkelsen	Hyundai i20 Coupe WRC	5:17.2	(Norway) Andreas Mikkelsen
Leg 1	SS2	Eastbank 1	18.92 km	(Norway) Andreas Mikkelsen	Hyundai i20 Coupe WRC	9:56.3	(Norway) Andreas Mikkelsen
Leg 1	SS3	Sherwood 1	26.59 km	(Norway) Andreas Mikkelsen	Hyundai i20 Coupe WRC	12:51.1	(Norway) Andreas Mikkelsen
Leg 1	SS4	Pilbara 2	9.71 km	(Norway) Andreas Mikkelsen	Hyundai i20 Coupe WRC	5:14.0	(Norway) Andreas Mikkelsen
Leg 1	SS5	Eastbank 2	18.92 km	(Belgium) Thierry Neuville	Hyundai i20 Coupe WRC	9:48.8	(Norway) Andreas Mikkelsen
Leg 1	SS6	Sherwood 2	26.59 km	(Norway) Andreas Mikkelsen	Hyundai i20 Coupe WRC	12:38.1	(Norway) Andreas Mikkelsen
Leg 1	SS7	SSS Destination NSW 1	1.27 km	(Estonia) Ott Tänak (Belgium) Thierry Neuville	Ford Fiesta WRC; Hyundai i20 Coupe WRC	1:02.4	(Norway) Andreas Mikkelsen
Leg 1	SS8	SSS Destination NSW 2	1.27 km	(Belgium) Thierry Neuville	Hyundai i20 Coupe WRC	1:00.9	(Norway) Andreas Mikkelsen
Leg 2	SS9	Nambucca	48.89 km	(Belgium) Thierry Neuville	Hyundai i20 Coupe WRC	26:53.6	(Norway) Andreas Mikkelsen
Leg 2	SS10	Newry 1	20.86 km	(Finland) Jari-Matti Latvala	Toyota Yaris WRC	12:10.7	(Belgium) Thierry Neuville
Leg 2	SS11	SSS Raceway	1.37 km	(Estonia) Ott Tänak	Ford Fiesta WRC	1:15.3	(Belgium) Thierry Neuville
Leg 2	SS12	Welshs Creek	33.49 km	(Belgium) Thierry Neuville	Hyundai i20 Coupe WRC	17:44.8	(Belgium) Thierry Neuville
Leg 2	SS13	Argents Hill	12.33 km	(Belgium) Thierry Neuville	Hyundai i20 Coupe WRC	6:42.4	(Belgium) Thierry Neuville
Leg 2	SS14	Newry 2	20.86 km	**Stage cancelled**			
Leg 2	SS15	SSS Destination NSW 3	1.27 km	(Belgium) Thierry Neuville (Republic of Ireland) Craig Breen	Hyundai i20 Coupe WRC; Citroën C3 WRC	1:02.3	(Belgium) Thierry Neuville
Leg 2	SS16	SSS Destination NSW 4	1.27 km	(Estonia) Ott Tänak	Ford Fiesta WRC	1:01.8	(Belgium) Thierry Neuville
Leg 3	SS17	Pilbara Reverse 1	10.03 km	(United Kingdom) Elfyn Evans	Ford Fiesta WRC	5:23.1	(Belgium) Thierry Neuville
Leg 3	SS18	Bucca	31.90 km	(New Zealand) Hayden Paddon	Hyundai i20 Coupe WRC	16:57.4	(Belgium) Thierry Neuville
Leg 3	SS19	Wedding Bells 1	6.44 km	(Belgium) Thierry Neuville	Hyundai i20 Coupe WRC	3:55.5	(Belgium) Thierry Neuville
Leg 3	SS20	Pilbara Reverse 2	10.03 km	**Stage cancelled**			
Leg 3	SS21	Wedding Bells 2 [Power Stage]	6.44 km	(France) Sébastien Ogier	Ford Fiesta WRC	3:32.6	(Belgium) Thierry Neuville

=== Power Stage ===
The Power Stage was a 10.12 km (6.3 mi) stage at the end of the rally.

Pos.	Driver	Co-driver	Car	Time	Diff.	Pts.
1	(France) Sébastien Ogier	(France) Julien Ingrassia	Ford Fiesta WRC	3:32.6		5
2	(Estonia) Ott Tänak	(Estonia) Martin Järveoja	Ford Fiesta WRC	3:32.7	+0.1	4
3	(Finland) Esapekka Lappi	(Finland) Janne Ferm	Toyota Yaris WRC	3:34.3	+1.6	3
4	(Norway) Andreas Mikkelsen	(Norway) Anders Jæger	Hyundai i20 Coupe WRC	3:34.7	+2.1	2
5	(United Kingdom) Kris Meeke	(Republic of Ireland) Paul Nagle	Citroën C3 WRC	3:35.1	+2.5	1

=== Championship standings after the rally ===
- **Bold text** indicates 2017 World Champions.

Drivers' Championship standings

Pos.	Driver	Points
1	(France) **Sébastien Ogier**	232
2	(Belgium) Thierry Neuville	208
3	(Estonia) Ott Tänak	191
4	(Finland) Jari-Matti Latvala	136
5	(United Kingdom) Elfyn Evans	128

Manufacturers' Championship standings

Pos.	Manufacturer	Points
1	(United Kingdom) **M-Sport World Rally Team**	428
2	(South Korea) Hyundai Motorsport	345
3	(Japan) Toyota Gazoo Racing WRT	251
4	(France) Citroën Total Abu Dhabi WRT	218
