= 2018 Rally Argentina =

2018 Rally Argentina: 38. YPF Rally Argentina
Round 5 of 13 in the 2018 World Rally Championship
| ← Previous event | Next event → |
- Host country: Argentina
- Rally base: Villa Carlos Paz, Córdoba
- Dates run: 26 – 29 April 2018
- Start location: Villa Carlos Paz, Córdoba
- Finish location: El Cóndor, Córdoba
- Stages: 18 (358.25 km; 222.61 miles)
- Stage surface: Gravel
- Transport distance: 942.40 km (585.58 miles)
- Overall distance: 1,300.65 km (808.19 miles)

Statistics
- Crews registered: 27
- Crews: 27 at start, 19 at finish

Overall results
- Overall winner: (Estonia) Ott Tänak (Estonia) Martin Järveoja (Japan) Toyota Gazoo Racing WRT; 3:43:28.9
- Power Stage winner: (Belgium) Thierry Neuville (Belgium) Nicolas Gilsoul (South Korea) Hyundai Shell Mobis WRT

Support category results
- WRC-2 winner: (Sweden) Pontus Tidemand (Sweden) Jonas Andersson (Czech Republic) Škoda Motorsport; 3:55:44.7
- WRC-3 winner: no WRC-3 entries

The 2018 Rally Argentina (formally known as the YPF Rally Argentina 2018) was a motor racing event for rally cars that was held over four days between 26 and 29 April 2018. It marked the thirty-eighth running of Rally Argentina, and was the fifth round of the 2018 World Rally Championship and its support categories, the WRC-2 and WRC-3 championships. The event was based in Villa Carlos Paz in Córdoba Province and consisted of eighteen special stages totalling 358.25 km (222.61 mi) competitive kilometres.

Thierry Neuville and Nicolas Gilsoul were the defending rally winners. Ott Tänak and Martin Järveoja won the rally. Their team, Toyota Gazoo Racing WRT, were the manufacturers' winners, while the Škoda Motorsport crew of Pontus Tidemand and Jonas Andersson won the World Rally Championship-2 category in a Škoda Fabia R5.

== Background ==
=== Championship standings prior to the event ===
Sébastien Ogier and Julien Ingrassia entered the round with a seventeen-point lead in the World Championships for Drivers and Co-drivers. In the World Championship for Manufacturers, Hyundai Shell Mobis WRT held a four-point lead over M-Sport Ford WRT.

=== Entry list ===
The following crews were entered into the rally. The event was open to crews competing in the World Rally Championship, World Rally Championship-2, and the World Rally Championship-3. The final entry list consisted of twelve World Rally Car entries and ten crews entered in the World Rally Championship-2. There were no entries for the World Rally Championship-3.

| No. | Entrant | Driver | Co-Driver | Car | Tyre |
|---|---|---|---|---|---|
World Rally Car entries
| 1 | (United Kingdom) M-Sport Ford WRT | (France) Sébastien Ogier | (France) Julien Ingrassia | Ford Fiesta WRC | M |
| 2 | (United Kingdom) M-Sport Ford WRT | (United Kingdom) Elfyn Evans | (United Kingdom) Daniel Barritt | Ford Fiesta WRC | M |
| 3 | (United Kingdom) M-Sport Ford WRT | (Finland) Teemu Suninen | (Finland) Mikko Markkula | Ford Fiesta WRC | M |
| 4 | (South Korea) Hyundai Shell Mobis WRT | (Norway) Andreas Mikkelsen | (Norway) Anders Jæger-Synnevaag | Hyundai i20 Coupe WRC | M |
| 5 | (South Korea) Hyundai Shell Mobis WRT | (Belgium) Thierry Neuville | (Belgium) Nicolas Gilsoul | Hyundai i20 Coupe WRC | M |
| 6 | (South Korea) Hyundai Shell Mobis WRT | (Spain) Dani Sordo | (Spain) Carlos del Barrio | Hyundai i20 Coupe WRC | M |
| 7 | (Japan) Toyota Gazoo Racing WRT | (Finland) Jari-Matti Latvala | (Finland) Miikka Anttila | Toyota Yaris WRC | M |
| 8 | (Japan) Toyota Gazoo Racing WRT | (Estonia) Ott Tänak | (Estonia) Martin Järveoja | Toyota Yaris WRC | M |
| 9 | (Japan) Toyota Gazoo Racing WRT | (Finland) Esapekka Lappi | (Finland) Janne Ferm | Toyota Yaris WRC | M |
| 10 | (France) Citroën Total Abu Dhabi WRT | (United Kingdom) Kris Meeke | (Republic of Ireland) Paul Nagle | Citroën C3 WRC | M |
| 11 | (France) Citroën Total Abu Dhabi WRT | (Republic of Ireland) Craig Breen | (United Kingdom) Scott Martin | Citroën C3 WRC | M |
| 12 | (France) Citroën Total Abu Dhabi WRT | (United Arab Emirates) Khalid Al-Qassimi | (United Kingdom) Chris Patterson | Citroën C3 WRC | M |
World Rally Championship-2 entries
| 31 | (Czech Republic) Škoda Motorsport | (Sweden) Pontus Tidemand | (Sweden) Jonas Andersson | Škoda Fabia R5 | M |
| 32 | (United Kingdom) Gus Greensmith | (United Kingdom) Gus Greensmith | (United Kingdom) Craig Parry | Ford Fiesta R5 | M |
| 33 | (Chile) Pedro Heller | (Chile) Pedro Heller | (Argentina) Pablo Olmos | Ford Fiesta R5 | M |
| 34 | (Bolivia) Marco Bulacia Wilkinson | (Bolivia) Marco Bulacia Wilkinson | (Argentina) Fernando Mussano | Ford Fiesta R5 | M |
| 35 | (Czech Republic) Škoda Motorsport | (Finland) Kalle Rovanperä | (Finland) Jonne Halttunen | Škoda Fabia R5 | M |
| 36 | (Spain) Nil Solans | (Spain) Nil Solans | (Spain) Miquel Ibañez | Ford Fiesta R5 | D |
| 37 | (Paraguay) Gustavo Saba | (Paraguay) Gustavo Saba | (Argentina) Marcelo der Ohannesian | Škoda Fabia R5 | D |
| 38 | (Paraguay) Diego Domínguez | (Paraguay) Diego Domínguez | (Argentina) Edgardo Galindo | Hyundai i20 R5 | D |
| 39 | (Paraguay) Tiago Weiler | (Paraguay) Tiago Weiler | (Argentina) Fabian Cretu | Škoda Fabia R5 | D |
| 40 | (United Kingdom) M-Sport Ford WRT | (Chile) Alberto Heller | (Argentina) José Diaz | Ford Fiesta R5 | M |
Other major entries
| 81 | (Netherlands) Wevers Sport (Note: Car owned and run by Wevers Sport, entered independently.) | (Norway) Ole Christian Veiby | (Norway) Stig Rune Skjærmoen | Škoda Fabia R5 | M |

== Report ==
=== Pre-event ===
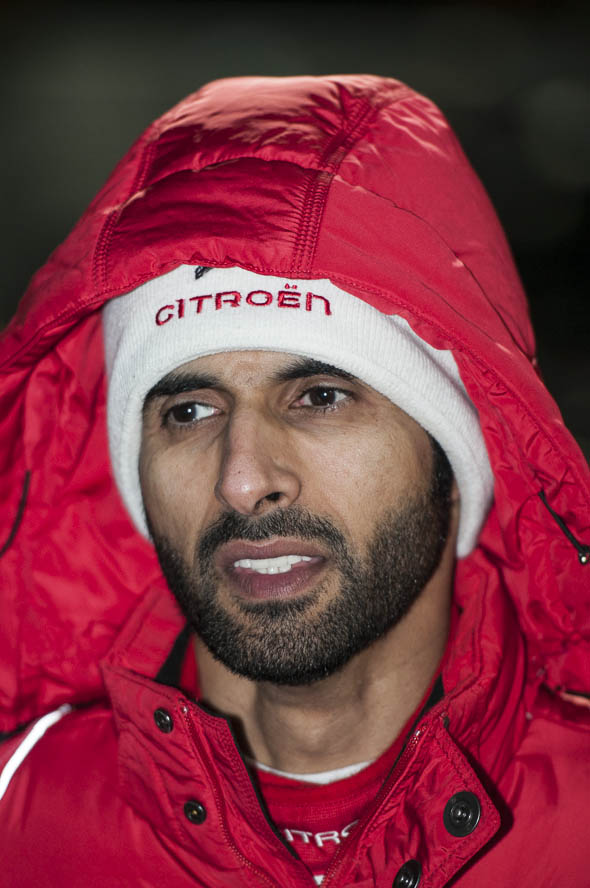
Khalid Al-Qassimi drove Citroën's third car in the rally.

Citroën expanded its operations to include a third entry. Craig Breen and Scott Martin returned to drive one car, having given up their seats in Mexico and Corsica to make way for Sébastien Loeb and Daniel Elena. Khalid Al-Qassimi and Chris Patterson are making their first appearance of the season, driving Citroën's third car.

Teemu Suninen and Mikko Markkula returned to drive M-Sport Ford's third entry. Suninen and Markkula had been replaced by tarmac specialists Bryan Bouffier and Xavier Panseri in Tour de Corse. Daniel Barritt also returned as Elfyn Evans' co-driver after being forced to miss the Tour de Corse to recover from a concussion sustained in an accident in Rally Mexico.

=== Thursday ===
Defending rally winner Thierry Neuville edged Ott Tänak's Toyota Yaris by 0.3 second over the mixed surface roads in the town centre. Championship leader Sébastien Ogier was a further 0.1 second back in third in a Fiesta. Andreas Mikkelsen was half a second off the pace, despite twice understeering through roundabouts. From fifth to ninth were Kris Meeke, Esapekka Lappi, Teemu Suninen, Dani Sordo, the Shakedown winner Jari-Matti Latvala. Elfyn Evans, who originally finished eleventh, climbed up to tenth after Craig Breen received a 10-second penalty for checking out late at the time control.

=== Friday ===
Although Ott Tänak got a half-spin in the second stage, he managed to gain a significant lead in subsequent stages, winning five of six special stages which earned him a 22.7-second lead over Kris Meeke, much to the astonishment of his rivals. Thierry Neuville ended the day at the third place, margined his teammate Dani Sordo by less than one second, while defending world champion Sébastien Ogier was a further 6.9 seconds behind. Craig Breen was seventh on the board, 41.2 seconds off the lead. Early leader Andreas Mikkelsen got a puncture in SS6, relegating him to seventh place, along with Esapekka Lappi who also suffered from two punctures. The Finn was in the thick of the podium battle but plunged to eighth. Elfyn Evans was ninth, the Welshman frustrated by his lack of pace, with Fiesta teammate Teemu Suninen completed the leaderboard. Jari-Matti Latvala was forced to retire from the rally after his Yaris' front right suspension and engine's oiling system sustained significant damage.

=== Saturday ===
Ott Tänak was almost unbeatable in the rally. He set another five fastest stage times out of seven. His lead is now up to 46.5 seconds overall. Thierry Neuville and Dani Sordo, who gained the podium place after Kris Meeke suffered a puncture and dropped to eighth, were the only two drivers to snatch stage victories from the Yaris diver. They were separated by 21.7 seconds. Defending world champion Sébastien Ogier and Andreas Mikkelsen climbed up to fourth and fifth overall respectively, followed by Esapekka Lappi, another 29.1 seconds behind. Elfyn Evans was seventh in another Fiesta, nearly three minutes off the lead. Teammate Teemu Suninen and WRC 2 leader Kalle Rovanperä finished in the top ten. Craig Breen rolled his C3 out of sixth, which damaged his roll cage. He was forced to retire.

=== Sunday ===
Ott Tänak dominated the rally and took his first rally victory of the season and first for his team, Toyota Gazoo Racing WRT. Thierry Neuville finished second with five Power Stage points, while his teammate Dani Sordo completed the podium. Defending world champion Sébastien Ogier finished fourth overall, margined Andreas Mikkelsen by just four seconds. Teammate Elfyn Evans finished sixth in another Fiesta, over three minutes off the lead. Kris Meeke finished at the seventh place after Saturday's puncture. Esapekka Lappi, Teemu Suninen and WRC 2 winner Pontus Tidemand, who recapture the position of category leader after Kalle Rovanperä rolled out in second to last stage, completed the leaderboard.

== Classification ==
=== Top ten finishers ===
The following crews finished the rally in each class's top ten. (Note: Only crews contesting the World Rally Championship, World Rally Championship-2 and World Rally Championship-3 are listed.)

| Position | | No. | Driver | Co-driver | Entrant | Car | Time | Difference | Points | |
| Event | Class | No. | Driver | Co-driver | Entrant | Car | Time | Difference | Class | Stage |
|---|---|---|---|---|---|---|---|---|---|---|
Overall classification
| 1 | 1 | 8 | (Estonia) Ott Tänak | (Estonia) Martin Järveoja | (Japan) Toyota Gazoo Racing WRT | Toyota Yaris WRC | 3:43:28.9 | 0.0 | 25 | 2 |
| 2 | 2 | 5 | (Belgium) Thierry Neuville | (Belgium) Nicolas Gilsoul | (South Korea) Hyundai Shell Mobis WRT | Hyundai i20 Coupe WRC | 3:44:06.6 | +37.7 | 18 | 5 |
| 3 | 3 | 6 | (Spain) Dani Sordo | (Spain) Carlos del Barrio | (South Korea) Hyundai Shell Mobis WRT | Hyundai i20 Coupe WRC | 3:44:44.6 | +1:15.7 | 15 | 0 |
| 4 | 4 | 1 | (France) Sébastien Ogier | (France) Julien Ingrassia | (United Kingdom) M-Sport Ford WRT | Ford Fiesta WRC | 3:45:27.5 | +1:58.6 | 12 | 4 |
| 5 | 5 | 4 | (Norway) Andreas Mikkelsen | (Norway) Anders Jæger-Synnevaag | (South Korea) Hyundai Shell Mobis WRT | Hyundai i20 Coupe WRC | 3:45:31.5 | +2:02.6 | 10 | 3 |
| 6 | 6 | 2 | (United Kingdom) Elfyn Evans | (United Kingdom) Daniel Barritt | (United Kingdom) M-Sport Ford WRT | Ford Fiesta WRC | 3:46:35.2 | +3:06.3 | 8 | 0 |
| 7 | 7 | 10 | (United Kingdom) Kris Meeke | (Republic of Ireland) Paul Nagle | (France) Citroën Total Abu Dhabi WRT | Citroën C3 WRC | 3:46:54.6 | +3:25.7 | 6 | 1 |
| 8 | 8 | 9 | (Finland) Esapekka Lappi | (Finland) Janne Ferm | (Japan) Toyota Gazoo Racing WRT | Toyota Yaris WRC | 3:48:01.5 | +4:32.6 | 4 | 0 |
| 9 | 9 | 3 | (Finland) Teemu Suninen | (Finland) Mikko Markkula | (United Kingdom) M-Sport Ford WRT | Ford Fiesta WRC | 3:49:07.5 | +5:38.6 | 2 | 0 |
| 10 | 10 | 31 | (Sweden) Pontus Tidemand | (Sweden) Jonas Andersson | (Czech Republic) Škoda Motorsport | Škoda Fabia R5 | 3:55:44.7 | +12:15.8 | 1 | 0 |
World Rally Championship-2
| 10 | 1 | 31 | (Sweden) Pontus Tidemand | (Sweden) Jonas Andersson | (Czech Republic) Škoda Motorsport | Škoda Fabia R5 | 3:55:44.7 | 0.0 | 25 | — |
| 12 | 2 | 32 | (United Kingdom) Gus Greensmith | (United Kingdom) Craig Parry | (United Kingdom) Gus Greensmith | Ford Fiesta R5 | 4:03:23.8 | +7:39.1 | 18 | — |
| 15 | 3 | 33 | (Chile) Pedro Heller | (Argentina) Pablo Almos | (Chile) Pedro Heller | Ford Fiesta R5 | 4:04:47.6 | +9:02.9 | 15 | — |
| 16 | 4 | 38 | (Paraguay) Diego Domínguez | (Argentina) Edgardo Galindo | (Paraguay) Diego Domínguez | Hyundai i20 R5 | 4:11:34.3 | +15:49.6 | 12 | — |
| 18 | 5 | 36 | (Spain) Nil Solans | (Spain) Miquel Ibáñez | (Spain) Nil Solans | Ford Fiesta R5 | 4:33:28.6 | +37:43.9 | 10 | — |

=== Other notable finishers ===
The following notable crews finished the rally outside top ten.

| Position | | No. | Driver | Co-driver | Entrant | Car | Class | Time | Points |
| Event | Class | No. | Driver | Co-driver | Entrant | Car | Class | Time | Stage |
|---|---|---|---|---|---|---|---|---|---|
| 14 | 14 | 12 | (United Arab Emirates) Khalid Al-Qassimi | (United Kingdom) Chris Patterson | (France) Citroën Total Abu Dhabi WRT | Citroën C3 WRC | WRC | 4:04:47.2 | 0 |

=== Special stages ===
Overall classification
| Day | Stage | Name | Length | Winner | Car | Time | Class leader |
| 26 April | — | Villa Carlos Paz [Shakedown] | 4.25 km | (Finland) Jari-Matti Latvala | Toyota Yaris WRC | 2:31.5 | —N/a |
| 26 April | SS1 | SSS Villa Carlos Paz | 1.9 km | (Belgium) Thierry Neuville | Hyundai i20 Coupe WRC | 1:54.4 | (Belgium) Thierry Neuville |
| 27 April | SS2 | Las Bajadas / Villa del Dique 1 | 16.65 km | (France) Sébastien Ogier | Ford Fiesta WRC | 8:55.7 | (France) Sébastien Ogier |
| 27 April | SS3 | Amboy / Yacanto 1 | 33.58 km | (Estonia) Ott Tänak | Toyota Yaris WRC | 19:19.9 | (Norway) Andreas Mikkelsen |
| 27 April | SS4 | Santa Rosa / San Agustín 1 | 23.85 km | (Estonia) Ott Tänak | Toyota Yaris WRC | 13:42.6 | (Norway) Andreas Mikkelsen |
| 27 April | SS5 | SSS Fernet Branca 1 | 6.04 km | (Spain) Dani Sordo | Hyundai i20 Coupe WRC | 4:42.0 | (Estonia) Ott Tänak |
| 27 April | SS6 | Las Bajadas / Villa del Dique 2 | 16.65 km | (Estonia) Ott Tänak | Toyota Yaris WRC | 8:43.4 | (Estonia) Ott Tänak |
| 27 April | SS7 | Amboy / Yacanto 2 | 33.58 km | (Estonia) Ott Tänak | Toyota Yaris WRC | 19:18.7 | (Estonia) Ott Tänak |
| 27 April | SS8 | Santa Rosa - San Agustín 2 | 23.85 km | (Estonia) Ott Tänak | Toyota Yaris WRC | 13:35.0 | (Estonia) Ott Tänak |
| 28 April | SS9 | Tanti - Mataderos 1 | 13.92 km | (Estonia) Ott Tänak | Toyota Yaris WRC | 9:00.1 | (Estonia) Ott Tänak |
| 28 April | SS10 | Los Gigantes - Cuchilla Nevada 1 | 16.02 km | (Estonia) Ott Tänak | Toyota Yaris WRC | 8:16.7 | (Estonia) Ott Tänak |
| 28 April | SS11 | Cuchilla Nevada - Rio Pintos 1 | 40.48 km | (Estonia) Ott Tänak | Toyota Yaris WRC | 24:31.0 | (Estonia) Ott Tänak |
| 28 April | SS12 | SSS Fernet Branca 2 | 6.04 km | (Belgium) Thierry Neuville | Hyundai i20 Coupe WRC | 4:40.8 | (Estonia) Ott Tänak |
| 28 April | SS13 | Tanti - Mataderos 2 | 13.92 km | (Estonia) Ott Tänak | Toyota Yaris WRC | 8:59.9 | (Estonia) Ott Tänak |
| 28 April | SS14 | Los Gigantes - Cuchilla Nevada 2 | 16.02 km | (Estonia) Ott Tänak | Toyota Yaris WRC | 8:15.5 | (Estonia) Ott Tänak |
| 28 April | SS15 | Cuchilla Nevada - Rio Pintos 2 | 40.48 km | (Spain) Dani Sordo | Hyundai i20 Coupe WRC | 24:03.0 | (Estonia) Ott Tänak |
| 29 April | SS16 | Copina - El Condor | 16.43 km | (Norway) Andreas Mikkelsen | Hyundai i20 Coupe WRC | 13:09.5 | (Estonia) Ott Tänak |
| 29 April | SS17 | Giulio Cesare - Mina Clavero | 22.41 km | (Belgium) Thierry Neuville | Hyundai i20 Coupe WRC | 18:31.3 | (Estonia) Ott Tänak |
| 29 April | SS18 | El Cóndor [Power stage] | 16.43 km | (Belgium) Thierry Neuville | Hyundai i20 Coupe WRC | 13:00.8 | (Estonia) Ott Tänak |
World Rally Championship-2
| 26 April | — | Villa Carlos Paz [Shakedown] | 4.25 km | (Finland) Kalle Rovanperä | Škoda Fabia R5 | 2:41.3 | —N/a |
| 26 April | SS1 | SSS Villa Carlos Paz | 1.9 km | (Finland) Kalle Rovanperä | Škoda Fabia R5 | 1:57.5 | (Finland) Kalle Rovanperä |
| 27 April | SS2 | Las Bajadas / Villa del Dique 1 | 16.65 km | (Sweden) Pontus Tidemand | Škoda Fabia R5 | 9:54.8 | (Sweden) Pontus Tidemand |
| 27 April | SS3 | Amboy / Yacanto 1 | 33.58 km | (Finland) Kalle Rovanperä | Škoda Fabia R5 | 20:42.9 | (Sweden) Pontus Tidemand |
| 27 April | SS4 | Santa Rosa / San Agustín 1 | 23.85 km | (Finland) Kalle Rovanperä | Škoda Fabia R5 | 14:29.1 | (Sweden) Pontus Tidemand |
| 27 April | SS5 | SSS Fernet Branca 1 | 6.04 km | (Finland) Kalle Rovanperä | Škoda Fabia R5 | 4:46.8 | (Sweden) Pontus Tidemand |
| 27 April | SS6 | Las Bajadas / Villa del Dique 2 | 16.65 km | (Sweden) Pontus Tidemand | Škoda Fabia R5 | 9:24.8 | (Sweden) Pontus Tidemand |
| 27 April | SS7 | Amboy / Yacanto 2 | 33.58 km | (Finland) Kalle Rovanperä | Škoda Fabia R5 | 20:29.1 | (Sweden) Pontus Tidemand |
| 27 April | SS8 | Santa Rosa - San Agustín 2 | 23.85 km | (Sweden) Pontus Tidemand | Škoda Fabia R5 | 14:19.3 | (Sweden) Pontus Tidemand |
| 28 April | SS9 | Tanti - Mataderos 1 | 13.92 km | (Finland) Kalle Rovanperä | Škoda Fabia R5 | 9:25.1 | (Sweden) Pontus Tidemand |
| 28 April | SS10 | Los Gigantes - Cuchilla Nevada 1 | 16.02 km | (Finland) Kalle Rovanperä | Škoda Fabia R5 | 8:49.5 | (Sweden) Pontus Tidemand |
| 28 April | SS11 | Cuchilla Nevada - Rio Pintos 1 | 40.48 km | (Finland) Kalle Rovanperä | Škoda Fabia R5 | 26:09.5 | (Finland) Kalle Rovanperä |
| 28 April | SS12 | SSS Fernet Branca 2 | 6.04 km | (Finland) Kalle Rovanperä | Škoda Fabia R5 | 4:48.1 | (Finland) Kalle Rovanperä |
| 28 April | SS13 | Tanti - Mataderos 2 | 13.92 km | (Finland) Kalle Rovanperä | Škoda Fabia R5 | 9:20.2 | (Finland) Kalle Rovanperä |
| 28 April | SS14 | Los Gigantes - Cuchilla Nevada 2 | 16.02 km | (Finland) Kalle Rovanperä | Škoda Fabia R5 | 8:43.6 | (Finland) Kalle Rovanperä |
| 28 April | SS15 | Cuchilla Nevada - Rio Pintos 2 | 40.48 km | (Sweden) Pontus Tidemand | Škoda Fabia R5 | 25:20.0 | (Finland) Kalle Rovanperä |
| 29 April | SS16 | Copina - El Condor | 16.43 km | (Sweden) Pontus Tidemand | Škoda Fabia R5 | 13:29.8 | (Finland) Kalle Rovanperä |
| 29 April | SS17 | Giulio Cesare - Mina Clavero | 22.41 km | (Sweden) Pontus Tidemand | Škoda Fabia R5 | 18:45.6 | (Sweden) Pontus Tidemand |
| 29 April | SS18 | El Cóndor | 16.43 km | (Sweden) Pontus Tidemand | Škoda Fabia R5 | 13:42.0 | (Sweden) Pontus Tidemand |

=== Power stage ===
The Power stage was a 16.43 km stage at the end of the rally. Additional World Championship points were awarded to the five fastest crews.

| Pos. | Driver | Co-driver | Car | Time | Diff. | Pts. |
|---|---|---|---|---|---|---|
| 1 | (Belgium) Thierry Neuville | (Belgium) Nicolas Gilsoul | Hyundai i20 Coupe WRC | 13:00.8 | 0.0 | 5 |
| 2 | (France) Sébastien Ogier | (France) Julien Ingrassia | Ford Fiesta WRC | 13:01.3 | +0.5 | 4 |
| 3 | (Norway) Andreas Mikkelsen | (Norway) Anders Jæger-Synnevaag | Hyundai i20 Coupe WRC | 13:01.5 | +0.7 | 3 |
| 4 | (Estonia) Ott Tänak | (Estonia) Martin Järveoja | Toyota Yaris WRC | 13:04.0 | +3.2 | 2 |
| 5 | (United Kingdom) Kris Meeke | (Republic of Ireland) Paul Nagle | Citroën C3 WRC | 13:04.5 | +3.7 | 1 |

=== Penalties ===
The following notable crews were given time penalty during the rally.

| Stage | No. | Driver | Co-driver | Entrant | Car | Class | Reason | Penalty |
|---|---|---|---|---|---|---|---|---|
| SS1 | 11 | (Republic of Ireland) Craig Breen | (United Kingdom) Scott Martin | (France) Citroën Total Abu Dhabi WRT | Citroën C3 WRC | WRC | 1 minute late | 0:10 |
| SS7 | 34 | (Bolivia) Marco Bulacia Wilkinson | (Argentina) Fernando Mussano | (Bolivia) Marco Bulacia Wilkinson | Ford Fiesta R5 | WRC-2 | 20 minutes late | 3:20 |
| SS13 | 38 | (Paraguay) Diego Domínguez | (Argentina) Edgardo Galindo | (Paraguay) Diego Domínguez | Hyundai i20 R5 | WRC-2 | 5 minutes late | 0:50 |

=== Retirements ===
The following notable crews retired from the event. Under Rally2 regulations, they were eligible to re-enter the event starting from the next leg. Crews that re-entered were given an additional time penalty.

| Stage | No. | Driver | Co-driver | Entrant | Car | Class | Cause | Re-entry |
|---|---|---|---|---|---|---|---|---|
| SS1 | 36 | (Spain) Nil Solans | (Spain) Miquel Ibañez | (Spain) Nil Solans | Ford Fiesta R5 | WRC-2 | Mechanical | Yes |
| SS3 | 7 | (Finland) Jari-Matti Latvala | (Finland) Miikka Anttila | (Japan) Toyota Gazoo Racing WRT | Toyota Yaris WRC | WRC | Suspension | No |
| SS3 | 39 | (Paraguay) Tiago Weiler | (Argentina) Fabian Cretu | (Paraguay) Tiago Weiler | Škoda Fabia R5 | WRC-2 | Accident | No |
| SS6 | 40 | (Chile) Alberto Heller | (Argentina) José Diaz | (United Kingdom) M-Sport Ford WRT | Ford Fiesta R5 | WRC-2 | Accident | No |
| SS8 | 37 | (Paraguay) Gustavo Saba | (Argentina) Marcelo der Ohannesian | (Paraguay) Gustavo Saba | Škoda Fabia R5 | WRC-2 | Mechanical | Yes |
| SS9 | 34 | (Bolivia) Marco Bulacia Wilkinson | (Argentina) Fernando Mussano | (Bolivia) Marco Bulacia Wilkinson | Ford Fiesta R5 | WRC-2 | Accident | No |
| SS12 | 11 | (Republic of Ireland) Craig Breen | (United Kingdom) Scott Martin | (France) Citroën Total Abu Dhabi WRT | Citroën C3 WRC | WRC | Accident | No |
| SS17 | 35 | (Finland) Kalle Rovanperä | (Finland) Jonne Halttunen | (Czech Republic) Škoda Motorsport | Škoda Fabia R5 | WRC-2 | Accident | No |
| SS18 | 37 | (Paraguay) Gustavo Saba | (Argentina) Marcelo der Ohannesian | (Paraguay) Gustavo Saba | Škoda Fabia R5 | WRC-2 | Accident | No |

=== Championship standings after the rally ===
==== Drivers' championships ====
World Rally Championship
| | Pos. | Driver | Points |
| | 1 | (France) Sébastien Ogier | 100 |
| | 2 | (Belgium) Thierry Neuville | 90 |
| | 3 | (Estonia) Ott Tänak | 72 |
| | 4 | (Norway) Andreas Mikkelsen | 54 |
| 3 | 5 | (Spain) Dani Sordo | 45 |
World Rally Championship-2
| | Pos. | Driver | Points |
| 1 | 1 | (Sweden) Pontus Tidemand | 68 |
| 1 | 2 | (Czech Republic) Jan Kopecký | 50 |
| 3 | 3 | (United Kingdom) Gus Greensmith | 36 |
| 6 | 4 | (Chile) Pedro Heller | 30 |
| 2 | 5 | (Japan) Takamoto Katsuta | 29 |
World Rally Championship-3
| | Pos. | Driver | Points |
| | 1 | (France) Jean-Baptiste Franceschi | 37 |
| | 2 | (Sweden) Denis Rådström | 37 |
| | 3 | (Sweden) Emil Bergkvist | 33 |
| | 4 | (France) Terry Folb | 28 |
| | 5 | (Italy) Enrico Brazzoli | 25 |

==== Co-Drivers' championships ====
World Rally Championship
| | Pos. | Co-Driver | Points |
| | 1 | (France) Julien Ingrassia | 100 |
| | 2 | (Belgium) Nicolas Gilsoul | 90 |
| | 3 | (Estonia) Martin Järveoja | 72 |
| | 4 | (Norway) Anders Jæger-Synnevaag | 54 |
| 3 | 5 | (Spain) Carlos del Barrio | 45 |
World Rally Championship-2
| | Pos. | Co-Driver | Points |
| 1 | 1 | (Sweden) Jonas Andersson | 68 |
| 1 | 2 | (Czech Republic) Pavel Dresler | 50 |
| 3 | 3 | (United Kingdom) Craig Parry | 36 |
| 6 | 4 | (Argentina) Pablo Olmos | 30 |
| 2 | 5 | (Finland) Marko Salminen | 29 |
World Rally Championship-3
| | Pos. | Co-Driver | Points |
| | 1 | (France) Romain Courbon | 37 |
| | 2 | (Sweden) Johan Johansson | 37 |
| | 3 | (Norway) Ola Fløene | 33 |
| | 4 | (France) Christopher Guieu | 28 |
| | 5 | (Italy) Luca Beltrame | 25 |

==== Manufacturers' and teams' championships ====
World Rally Championship
| | Pos. | Manufacturer | Points |
| | 1 | (South Korea) Hyundai Shell Mobis WRT | 144 |
| | 2 | (United Kingdom) M-Sport Ford WRT | 129 |
| | 3 | (Japan) Toyota Gazoo Racing WRT | 124 |
| | 4 | (France) Citroën Total Abu Dhabi WRT | 93 |
World Rally Championship-2
| | Pos. | Team | Points |
| 1 | 1 | (Czech Republic) Škoda Motorsport | 68 |
| 1 | 2 | (Czech Republic) Škoda Motorsport II | 50 |
| | 3 | (Finland) Tommi Mäkinen Racing | 35 |
| | 4 | (South Korea) Hyundai Motorsport | 30 |
| | 5 | (Finland) Printsport | 25 |
World Rally Championship-3
| | Pos. | Team | Points |
| | 1 | (Estonia) OT Racing | 37 |
| | 2 | (Germany) ADAC Sachsen | 37 |
| | 3 | (Italy) ACI Team Italia | 33 |
| | 4 | (Poland) Go+Cars Atlas Ward | 18 |
| | 5 | (Turkey) Castrol Ford Team Turkiye | 15 |

== Notes ==
| Previous rally: 2018 Tour de Corse | 2018 FIA World Rally Championship | Next rally: 2018 Rally de Portugal |
| Previous rally: 2017 Rally Argentina | 2018 Rally Argentina | Next rally: 2019 Rally Argentina |
