= Gus Greensmith =

British rally driver (born 1996)

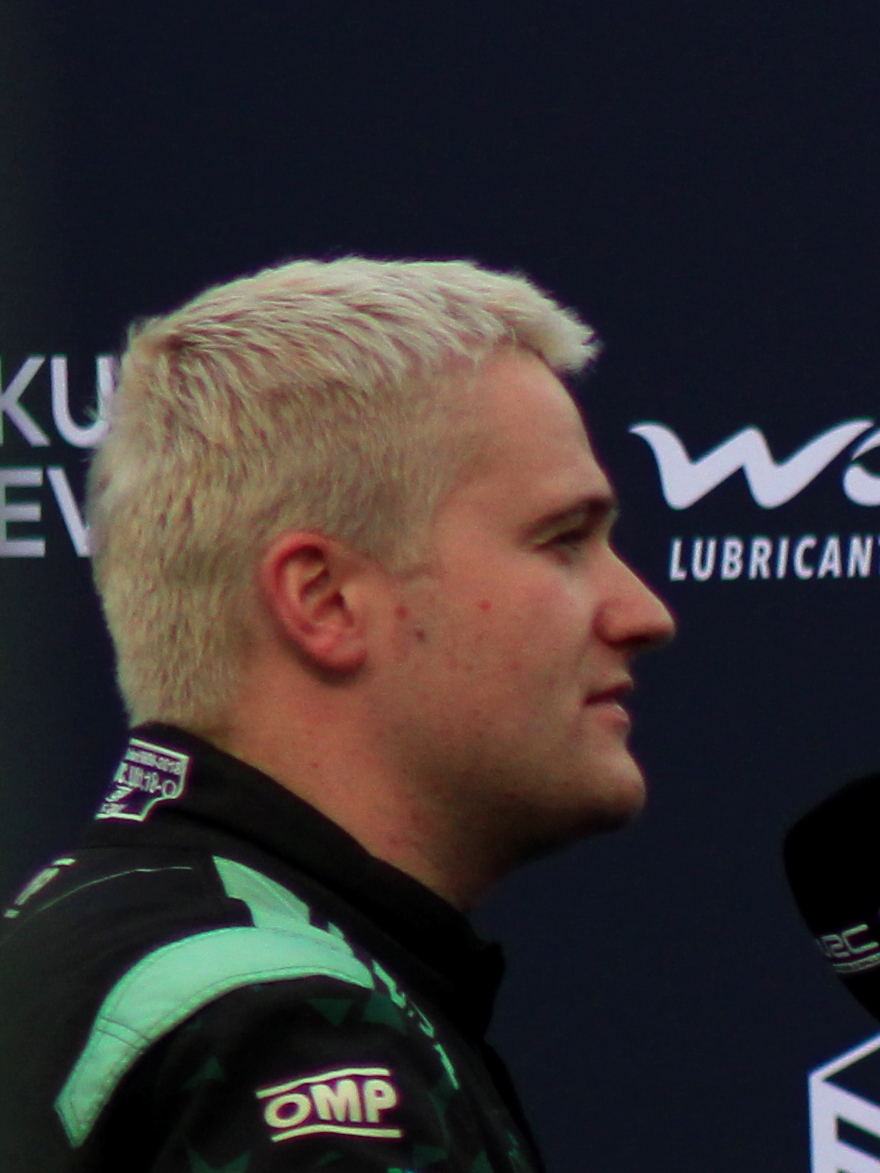
- Gus Greensmith at the 2023 Central European Rally

Personal information
- Nationality: (United Kingdom) British
- Full name: Fergus Greensmith
- Born: 26 December 1996 (age 29); Manchester, England

World Rally Championship record
- Years active: 2014–present
- Co-driver: (United Kingdom) Carl Williamson (United Kingdom) Elliott Edmondson (Italy) Alex Gelsomino (Germany) Katrin Becker (United Kingdom) Craig Parry (United Kingdom) Stuart Loudon (Republic of Ireland) Chris Patterson (Sweden) Jonas Andersson
- Teams: M-Sport, Toksport WRT
- Rallies: 100
- Championships: 0
- Rally wins: 0
- Podiums: 0
- Stage wins: 2
- Total points: 191
- First rally: 2014 Wales Rally GB
- Last rally: 2026 Safari Rally
- Last updated on: 12 April 2026.

Fergus "Gus" Greensmith (born 26 December 1996) is a British rally driver.

== Rally career ==
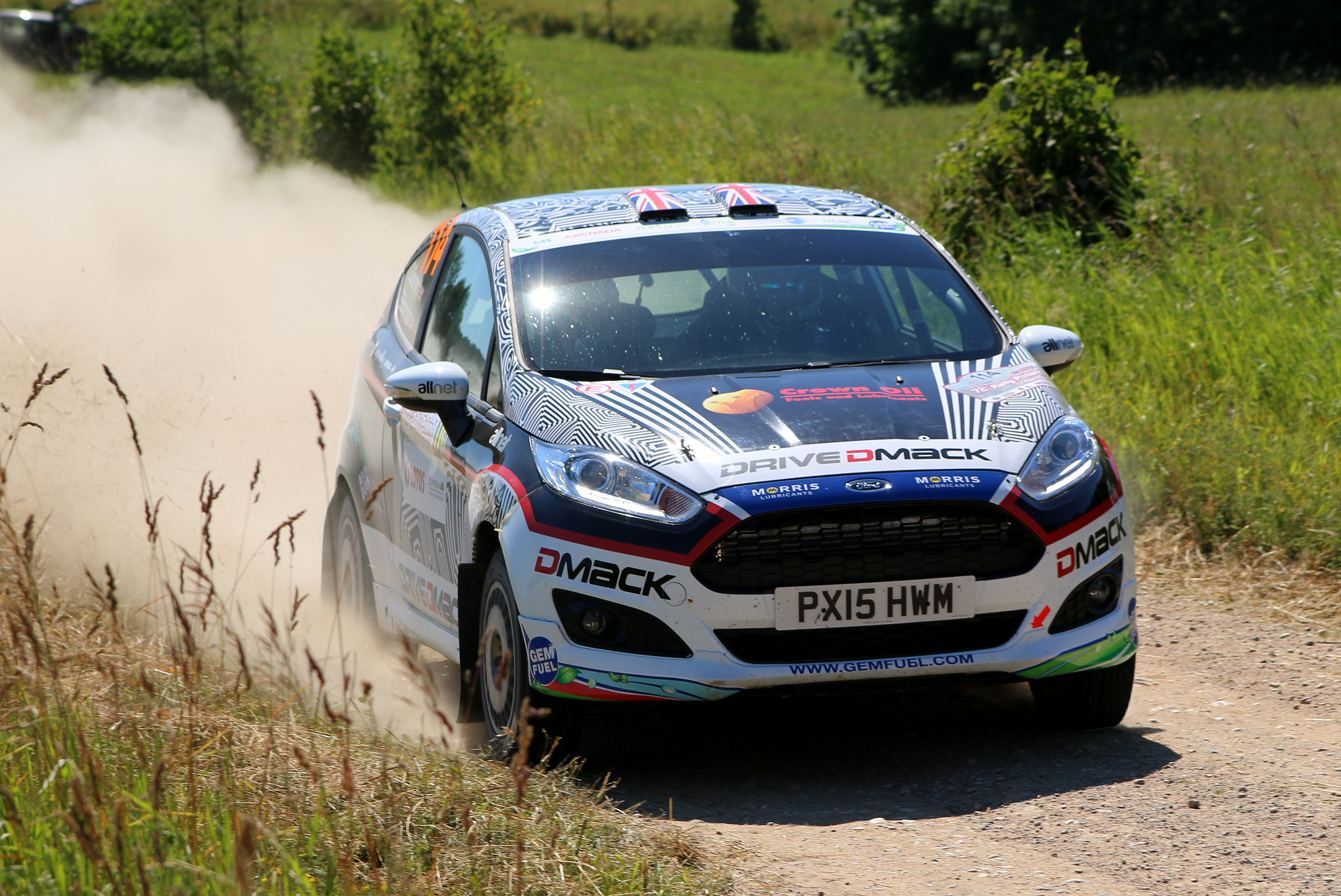
Greensmith driving a Ford Fiesta R2T at 2015 Rally Poland

Greensmith's family owns fuel and lubricants distributor Crown Oil. He was a former youth goalkeeper for Manchester City F.C. and karter before moving into the ranks of rally driving.

As a karter who went to school in Manchester, Greensmith appeared in the CIK-FIA U18 World Karting Championship in 2012, racing alongside Charles Leclerc, Ben Barnicoat and Joey Mawson among others.

In 2014, Greensmith won the British Junior Rally Championship on a Ford Fiesta R1, and debuted at the Wales Rally GB on a Ford Fiesta R2.

In 2015, Greensmith entered the Drive DMACK Fiesta Trophy, where he finished sixth. He also entered five WRC rounds on a Ford Fiesta R2T.

At the 2016 Wales Rally GB, Greensmith drove a M-Sport Ford Fiesta R5.

Greensmith competed full-time in the 2017 World Rally Championship-2 on an M-Sport Ford Fiesta R5, finishing 11th in the overall standings.

In the 2018 World Rally Championship-2, Greensmith scored four podiums and placed fourth in points. In the 2018 Rally Mexico, Greensmith finished ninth and scored World Rally Championship points for the first time.

In 2019, Greensmith claimed two wins and six podiums on a Ford Fiesta R5, ranking third in the WRC-2 standings. He also entered three rounds with an M-Sport Ford Fiesta WRC, finishing ninth in Germany.

Greensmith became an M-Sport Ford factory driver for the 2020 World Rally Championship. He had a best finish of fifth at Turkey, and finished 11th in points.

In 2021, Greensmith had a best result of fourth at the Safari Rally, and was ninth in the overall table.

Greensmith earned his first WRC stage victory at the 2022 Monte Carlo Rally. He scored points in five out of 13 races, and was tenth in the WRC drivers standings.

== Media ==
In 2015, Greensmith teamed up with Idris Elba in a documentary series that Elba was filming for Discovery TV and drove him in a Ford Fiesta.

== Personal life ==
In 2025, Greensmith married his Finnish wife, Jessica Malin, in her hometown of Jyväskylä.

== Career results ==
=== WRC results ===
| Year | Entrant | Car | 1 | 2 | 3 | 4 | 5 | 6 | 7 | 8 | 9 | 10 | 11 | 12 | 13 | 14 | Pos. | Points |
|---|---|---|---|---|---|---|---|---|---|---|---|---|---|---|---|---|---|---|
| 2014 | Gus Greensmith | Ford Fiesta R2 | MON | SWE | MEX | POR | ARG | ITA | POL | FIN | GER | AUS | FRA | ESP | GBR; 42 | | NC | 0 |
| 2015 | Gus Greensmith | Ford Fiesta R2T | MON | SWE | MEX | ARG | POR; 36 | ITA | POL; 40 | FIN; Ret | GER; Ret | AUS | FRA | ESP; 57 | GBR; 55 | | NC | 0 |
| 2016 | Gus Greensmith | Ford Fiesta R2 | MON | SWE | MEX | ARG | POR; Ret | ITA | POL; 35 | FIN; Ret | GER; 63 | CHN; C | FRA | ESP; 24 | | | NC | 0 |
| 2016 | M-Sport World Rally Team | Ford Fiesta R5 | | | | | | | | | | | | | GBR; 34 | AUS | NC | 0 |
| 2017 | MSRT | Ford Fiesta R5 | MON | SWE; 16 | MEX | FRA | ARG | POR; 20 | ITA | POL; 22 | FIN; 32 | GER; Ret | ESP; 45 | GBR; 17 | AUS | | NC | 0 |
| 2018 | Gus Greensmith | Ford Fiesta R2T | MON; Ret | SWE | | | | | | | | | | | | | 23rd | 2 |
| 2018 | M-Sport World Rally Team | Ford Fiesta R5 | | | MEX; 9 | FRA; 13 | ARG; 12 | POR; 18 | ITA | FIN; 13 | GER; Ret | TUR; Ret | GBR; 11 | ESP | AUS | | 23rd | 2 |
| 2019 | M-Sport Ford WRT | Ford Fiesta R5 | MON; 7 | SWE; 19 | MEX | FRA | ARG; 15 | CHL; 12 | | ITA; 42 | | | | | | | 15th | 9 |
| 2019 | M-Sport Ford WRT | Ford Fiesta WRC | | | | | | | POR; Ret | | FIN; Ret | GER; 9 | | | | | 15th | 9 |
| 2019 | M-Sport Ford WRT | Ford Fiesta R5 Mk. II | | | | | | | | | | | TUR; 10 | GBR; 33 | ESP; 15 | AUS; C | 15th | 9 |
| 2020 | M-Sport Ford WRT | Ford Fiesta WRC | MON; 63 | SWE | MEX; 9 | EST; 8 | TUR; 5 | ITA; 25 | MNZ; Ret | | | | | | | | 11th | 16 |
| 2021 | M-Sport Ford WRT | Ford Fiesta WRC | MON; 8 | ARC; 9 | CRO; 7 | POR; 5 | ITA; 26 | KEN; 4 | EST; 32 | BEL; 47 | GRE; 5 | FIN; 6 | ESP; 6 | MNZ; 8 | | | 9th | 64 |
| 2022 | M-Sport Ford WRT | Ford Puma Rally1 | MON; 5 | SWE; 5 | CRO; 15 | POR; 19 | ITA; 7 | KEN; 14 | EST; Ret | FIN; 7 | BEL; 19 | GRE; 29 | NZL; Ret | ESP; Ret | JPN; 6 | | 10th | 44 |
| 2023 | Toksport WRT 2 | Škoda Fabia RS Rally2 | MON | SWE | MEX; 6 | CRO; 14 | POR; 6 | ITA; Ret | KEN | EST; Ret | FIN; Ret | GRE; 8 | CHL; 7 | EUR; 14 | JPN | | 13th | 26 |
| 2024 | Toksport WRT | Škoda Fabia RS Rally2 | MON | SWE | KEN; 6 | CRO; 11 | POR; Ret | ITA | POL; 17 | LAT; 13 | FIN; Ret | GRE; Ret | CHL; 10 | EUR; 12 | JPN; 10 | | 18th | 8 |
| 2025 | Gus Greensmith | Škoda Fabia RS Rally2 | MON; 12 | SWE | KEN; 6 | ESP | POR; 12 | ITA | GRE; 7 | EST | FIN; 18 | PAR; 27 | CHL; 26 | EUR | JPN; Ret | SAU; 12 | 14th | 14 |
| 2026 | Gus Greensmith | Toyota GR Yaris Rally2 | MON | SWE | KEN; 6 | CRO | ESP | POR; 22 | JPN | GRE; 37 | EST; 20 | FIN; Ret | PAR; 8 | CHL; 10 | ITA; 10 | | 15th | 14 |

* Season still in progress.

=== Drive DMACK Cup results ===
| Year | Entrant | Car | 1 | 2 | 3 | 4 | 5 | Pos. | Points |
|---|---|---|---|---|---|---|---|---|---|
| 2015 | Gus Greensmith | Ford Fiesta R2T | POR; 4 | POL; 4 | FIN; Ret | GER; Ret | ESP; 7 | 6th | 48 |
| 2016 | Gus Greensmith | Ford Fiesta R2T | POR; Ret | POL; 4 | FIN; Ret | GER; 6 | ESP; 2 | 4th | 52 |

=== WRC-2 results ===
| Year | Entrant | Car | 1 | 2 | 3 | 4 | 5 | 6 | 7 | 8 | 9 | 10 | 11 | 12 | 13 | 14 | Pos | Points |
|---|---|---|---|---|---|---|---|---|---|---|---|---|---|---|---|---|---|---|
| 2016 | M-Sport World Rally Team | Ford Fiesta R5 | MON | SWE | MEX | ARG | POR | ITA | POL | FIN | GER | CHN; C | FRA | ESP | GBR; 12 | AUS | NC | 0 |
| 2017 | MSRT | Ford Fiesta R5 | MON | SWE; 5 | MEX | FRA | ARG | POR; 6 | ITA | POL; 7 | FIN; 8 | GER; Ret | ESP; 13 | GBR; 6 | AUS | | 11th | 36 |
| 2018 | MSRT | Ford Fiesta R5 | MON | SWE | MEX; 2 | FRA | ARG; 2 | POR; 8 | ITA | FIN; 3 | GER; Ret | TUR; Ret | GBR; 3 | ESP | AUS | | 4th | 70 |
| 2023 | Toksport WRT 2 | Škoda Fabia RS Rally2 | MON | SWE | MEX; 1 | CRO; 6 | POR; 1 | ITA; Ret | KEN | EST | FIN; Ret | GRE; 2 | CHL; 2 | EUR; 4 | JPN | | 2nd | 111 |
| 2024 | Toksport WRT | Škoda Fabia RS Rally2 | MON | SWE | KEN; 1 | CRO | POR; Ret | ITA | POL; 9 | LAT | FIN; Ret | GRE; Ret | CHL; 3 | EUR | JPN; 4 | | 7th | 54 |
| 2025 | Gus Greensmith | Škoda Fabia RS Rally2 | MON | SWE | KEN; 1 | ESP | POR; 3 | ITA | GRE; 2 | EST | FIN | PAR; 15 | CHL; 13 | EUR | JPN; Ret | SAU; 1 | 4th | 82 |
| 2026 | Gus Greensmith | Toyota GR Yaris Rally2 | MON | SWE | KEN; 2 | CRO | ESP | POR; 10 | JPN | GRE; 19 | EST; NC | FIN; NC | PAR; 2 | CHL; 3 | ITA; 3 | | 6th | 65 |

* Season still in progress.

=== WRC-2 Pro results ===
| Year | Entrant | Car | 1 | 2 | 3 | 4 | 5 | 6 | 7 | 8 | 9 | 10 | 11 | 12 | 13 | 14 | Pos. | Points |
|---|---|---|---|---|---|---|---|---|---|---|---|---|---|---|---|---|---|---|
| 2019 | M-Sport Ford WRT | Ford Fiesta R5 | MON; 1 | SWE; 3 | MEX | FRA | ARG; 2 | CHL; 3 | POR | ITA; 4 | | | | | | | 3rd | 137 |
| 2019 | M-Sport Ford WRT | Ford Fiesta R5 Mk. II | | | | | | | | | FIN; WD | GER | TUR; 1 | GBR; 3 | ESP; 4 | AUS; C | 3rd | 137 |
