= 2019 Rally Argentina =

39th edition of Rally Argentina

2019 Rally Argentina: 39. XION Rally Argentina
Round 5 of 14 in the 2019 World Rally Championship
← Previous event	Next event →
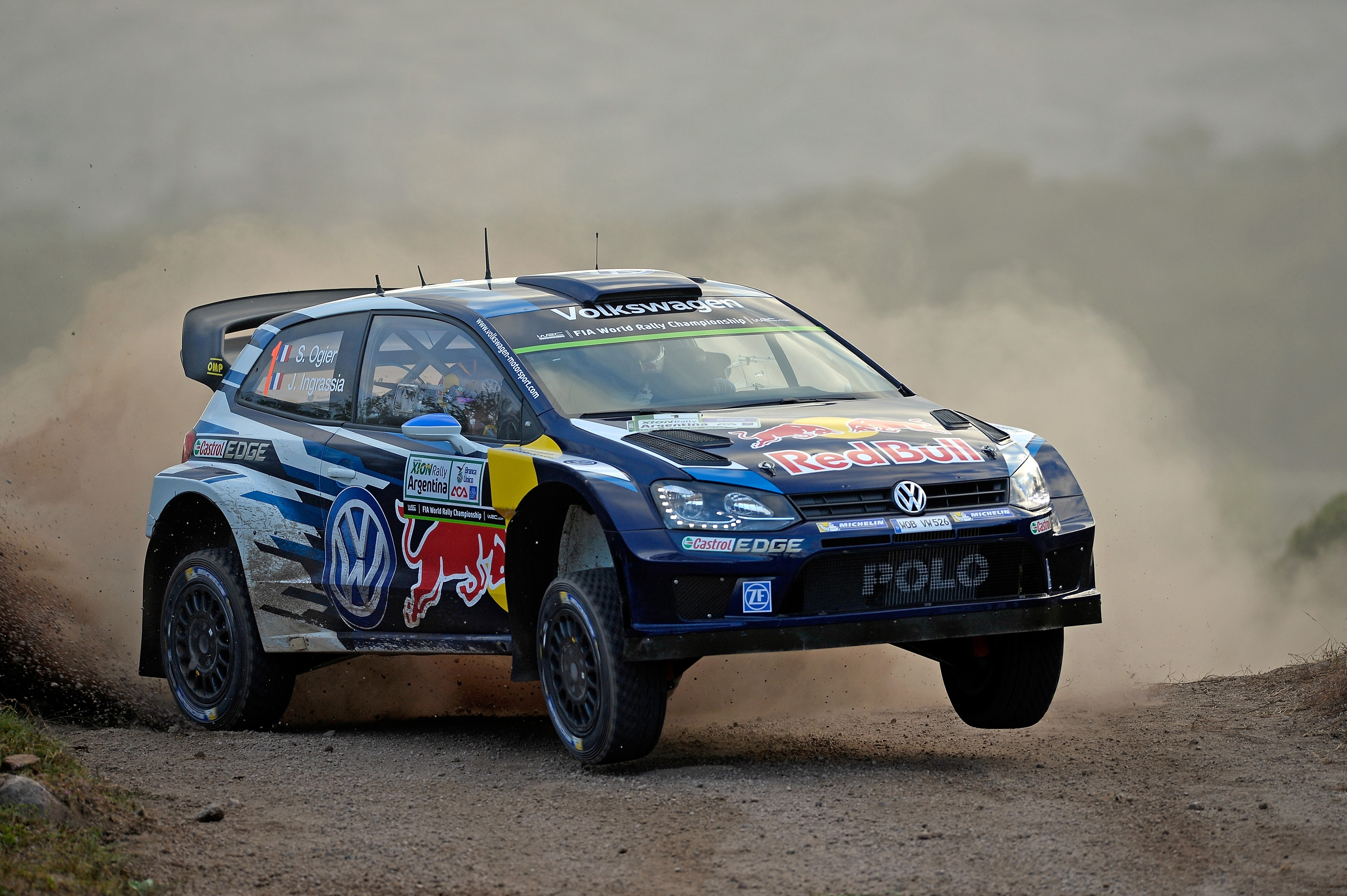
- Rally Argentina features with vast pampas plains, rugged mountains and softer lakeland landscapes.
- Host country: Argentina
- Rally base: Villa Carlos Paz, Córdoba
- Dates run: 25 – 28 April 2019
- Start location: Villa Carlos Paz, Córdoba
- Finish location: El Cóndor, Córdoba
- Stages: 18 (347.50 km; 215.93 miles)
- Stage surface: Gravel
- Transport distance: 952.88 km (592.09 miles)
- Overall distance: 1,300.38 km (808.02 miles)

Statistics
- Crews registered: 27
- Crews: 25 at start, 21 at finish

Overall results
- Overall winner: (Belgium) Thierry Neuville (Belgium) Nicolas Gilsoul (South Korea) Hyundai Shell Mobis WRT; 3:20:54.6
- Power Stage winner: (France) Sébastien Ogier (France) Julien Ingrassia (France) Citroën Total WRT

Support category results
- WRC-2 winner: (Chile) Pedro Heller (Spain) Marc Martí (Chile) Pedro Heller; 3:41:09.1

The 2019 Rally Argentina (also known as the XION Rally Argentina 2019) was a motor racing event for rally cars that held over four days between 25 and 28 April 2019. It marked the thirty-ninth running of Rally Argentina, and was the fifth round of the 2019 World Rally Championship, World Rally Championship-2 and the newly created WRC-2 Pro class. The 2019 event was based in Villa Carlos Paz in Córdoba Province and consisted of eighteen special stages totalling 347.50 km (215.93 mi) competitive kilometres.

Ott Tänak and Martin Järveoja were the defending rally winners. Their team, Toyota Gazoo Racing WRT, were the manufacturers' winners. Pontus Tidemand and Jonas Andersson were the defending winners in the World Rally Championship-2 category, but they did not participate in the event.

Thierry Neuville and Nicolas Gilsoul won the rally for the second time in their career. Their team, Hyundai Shell Mobis WRT, were the manufacturers' winners. The Citroën Total crew of Mads Østberg and Torstein Eriksen won the WRC-2 Pro category, finishing first in the combined WRC-2 category, while the crew of Pedro Heller and Marc Martí won the wider WRC-2 class. Østberg's win marked the first World Championship victory for the R5-spec Citroën C3.

== Background ==
=== Championship standings prior to the event ===
Thierry Neuville and Nicolas Gilsoul led both the drivers' and co-drivers' championships by two-points ahead of six-time world champions Sébastien Ogier and Julien Ingrassia. Ott Tänak and Martin Järveoja were third, a further three points behind. In the World Rally Championship for Manufacturers, Hyundai Shell Mobis WRT held a twelve-point lead over Citroën Total WRT.

In the World Rally Championship-2 Pro standings, Łukasz Pieniążek and Kamil Heller held a twenty-two-point lead ahead of Gus Greensmith and Elliott Edmondson in the drivers' and co-drivers' standings respectively. Kalle Rovanperä and Jonne Halttunen were third, four points further back. In the manufacturers' championship, M-Sport Ford WRT lead Škoda Motorsport by sixty-six points, with Citroën Total eleven points further behind in third.

In the World Rally Championship-2 standings, Ole Christian Veiby and Jonas Andersson led the drivers' and co-drivers' standings by twelve points respectively. Nikolay Gryazin and Yaroslav Fedorov were second, following by Yoann Bonato and Benjamin Boulloud in third.

=== Entry list ===
The following crews entered into the rally. The event was open to crews competing in the World Rally Championship, World Rally Championship-2, WRC-2 Pro and privateer entries not registered to score points in any championship. A total of twenty-seven entries were received, with ten crews entered with World Rally Cars and nine entered the World Rally Championship-2. Three crews were nominated to score points in the Pro class.

No.	Driver	Co-Driver	Entrant	Car	Tyre
World Rally Car entries
1	(France) Sébastien Ogier	(France) Julien Ingrassia	(France) Citroën Total WRT	Citroën C3 WRC	MI
3	(Finland) Teemu Suninen	(Finland) Marko Salminen	(United Kingdom) M-Sport Ford WRT	Ford Fiesta WRC	MI
4	(Finland) Esapekka Lappi	(Finland) Janne Ferm	(France) Citroën Total WRT	Citroën C3 WRC	MI
5	(United Kingdom) Kris Meeke	(United Kingdom) Sebastian Marshall	(Japan) Toyota Gazoo Racing WRT	Toyota Yaris WRC	MI
6	(Spain) Dani Sordo	(Spain) Carlos del Barrio	(South Korea) Hyundai Shell Mobis WRT	Hyundai i20 Coupe WRC	MI
8	(Estonia) Ott Tänak	(Estonia) Martin Järveoja	(Japan) Toyota Gazoo Racing WRT	Toyota Yaris WRC	MI
10	(Finland) Jari-Matti Latvala	(Finland) Miikka Anttila	(Japan) Toyota Gazoo Racing WRT	Toyota Yaris WRC	MI
11	(Belgium) Thierry Neuville	(Belgium) Nicolas Gilsoul	(South Korea) Hyundai Shell Mobis WRT	Hyundai i20 Coupe WRC	MI
33	(United Kingdom) Elfyn Evans	(United Kingdom) Scott Martin	(United Kingdom) M-Sport Ford WRT	Ford Fiesta WRC	MI
89	(Norway) Andreas Mikkelsen	(Norway) Anders Jæger-Amland	(South Korea) Hyundai Shell Mobis WRT	Hyundai i20 Coupe WRC	MI
World Rally Championship-2 Pro entries
21	(United Kingdom) Gus Greensmith	(United Kingdom) Elliott Edmondson	(United Kingdom) M-Sport Ford WRT	Ford Fiesta R5	MI
22	(Norway) Mads Østberg	(Norway) Torstein Eriksen	(France) Citroën Total	Citroën C3 R5	MI
23	(Bolivia) Marco Bulacia Wilkinson	(Argentina) Fabian Cretu	(Czech Republic) Škoda Motorsport (Note: Entry run by VIALCO Racing.)	Škoda Fabia R5	MI
World Rally Championship-2 entries
41	(Mexico) Benito Guerra	(Mexico) Jaime Zapata	(Mexico) Benito Guerra (Note: Entry operated by Race Seven.)	Škoda Fabia R5	MI
42	(Chile) Alberto Heller	(Argentina) José Díaz	(Chile) Alberto Heller	Ford Fiesta R5	MI
43	(Poland) Kajetan Kajetanowicz	(Poland) Maciej Szczepaniak	(Poland) Kajetan Kajetanowicz (Note: Entry operated by Lotos Dynamic Rally Team.)	Volkswagen Polo GTI R5	P
44	(Japan) Takamoto Katsuta	(United Kingdom) Daniel Barritt	(Japan) Takamoto Katsuta (Note: Entry operated by Tommi Mäkinen Racing.)	Ford Fiesta R5	P
45	(Chile) Pedro Heller	(Spain) Marc Martí	(Chile) Pedro Heller	Ford Fiesta R5	MI
46	(Brazil) Paulo Nobre	(Brazil) Gabriel Morales	(Brazil) Paulo Nobre (Note: Entry operated by Palmerinha Rally.)	Škoda Fabia R5	P

=== Route ===
No major changes are made to the route this year apart from some slight length-reductions to selected stages.

==== Itinerary ====
All dates and times are ART (UTC-3).

Date	Time	No.	Stage name	Distance
25 April	10:00	—	Villa Carlos Paz [Shakedown]	4.25 km
Leg 1 — 147.82 km
25 April	19:08	SS1	SSS Villa Carlos Paz	1.90 km
26 April	8:08	SS2	Las Bajadas / Villa del Dique 1	16.65 km
26 April	8:55	SS3	Amboy / Yacanto 1	29.85 km
26 April	10:08	SS4	Santa Rosa / San Agustin 1	23.44 km
26 April	12:03	SS5	SSS Parque Tematico 1	6.04 km
26 April	14:51	SS6	Las Bajadas / Villa del Dique 2	16.65 km
26 April	15:38	SS7	Amboy / Yacanto 2	29.85 km
26 April	16:51	SS8	Santa Rosa / San Agustin 2	23.44 km
Leg 2 — 146.52 km
27 April	7:47	SS9	Tanti — Mataderos 1	13.92 km
27 April	8:38	SS10	Mataderos — Cuchilla Nevada 1	22.67 km
27 April	9:25	SS11	Cuchilla Nevada — Characato 1	33.65 km
27 April	11:26	SS12	SSS Parque Tematico 2	6.04 km
27 April	13:17	SS13	Tanti — Mataderos 2	13.92 km
27 April	14:08	SS14	Mataderos — Cuchilla Nevada 2	22.67 km
27 April	14:55	SS15	Cuchilla Nevada — Characato 2	33.65 km
Leg 3 — 53.16 km
28 April	9:08	SS16	Copina — El Cóndor (Note: SS16 and S18 are the same stage, but are known by different stage names.)	16.43 km
28 April	10:31	SS17	Mina Clavero — Giulio Cesare	20.30 km
28 April	12:18	SS18	El Cóndor [Power Stage]	16.43 km

== Report ==
=== World Rally Cars ===
Normally, the road cleaner has to endure the insufficient grip, but this year in Argentina was different — persistent rain over the previous forty-eight hours meant the road was muddy and difficult to drive through for the crews who started down the road order. As a result, championship leader Thierry Neuville grabbed the lead as defending rally winner Ott Tänak lost valuable time with a broken drive shaft. The only casualty of the day was Esapekka Lappi, who was crashed out in the final stage of Friday and forced to retire from the rally.

Coming to the second leg, the battle for the victory was extremely intense until Tänak stopped his Yaris due to an alternator failure in the afternoon loop. Another casualty of the leg was Elfyn Evans, who rolled his Fiesta heavily after smashed a huge rock. As a result, the Welshman was forced to retire from the weekend. Defending world champion Sébastien Ogier lost power steering in the morning loop, while Kris Meeke lost his brakes. Following the drivers ahead suffered issues, Andreas Mikkelsen charged himself to second overall after the oil-leak issue fixed. Eventually, the Hyundai duos managed to bring their team a 1–2 finish. Ogier completed the podium as Meeke receive a ten-second penalty for deviating from the correct route in Saturday morning's speed test.

==== Classification ====
Position		No.	Driver	Co-driver	Entrant	Car	Time	Difference	Points	
Event	Class	No.	Driver	Co-driver	Entrant	Car	Time	Difference	Event	Stage
1	1	11	Thierry Neuville	Nicolas Gilsoul	Hyundai Shell Mobis WRT	Hyundai i20 Coupe WRC	3:20:54.6	0.0	25	3
2	2	89	Andreas Mikkelsen	Anders Jæger-Amland	Hyundai Shell Mobis WRT	Hyundai i20 Coupe WRC	3:21:43.0	+48.4	18	0
3	3	1	Sébastien Ogier	Julien Ingrassia	Citroën Total WRT	Citroën C3 WRC	3:21:59.4	+1:04.8	15	5
4	4	5	Kris Meeke	Sebastian Marshall	Toyota Gazoo Racing WRT	Toyota Yaris WRC	3:22:00.8	+1:06.2	12	0
5	5	10	Jari-Matti Latvala	Miikka Anttila	Toyota Gazoo Racing WRT	Toyota Yaris WRC	3:22:15.7	+1:21.1	10	4
6	6	6	Dani Sordo	Carlos del Barrio	Hyundai Shell Mobis WRT	Hyundai i20 Coupe WRC	3:22:21.3	+1:26.7	8	2
7	7	3	Teemu Suninen	Marko Salminen	M-Sport Ford WRT	Ford Fiesta WRC	3:25:51.9	+4:57.3	6	0
8	8	8	Ott Tänak	Martin Järveoja	Toyota Gazoo Racing WRT	Toyota Yaris WRC	3:35:19.4	+14:24.8	4	1
Retired SS10		33	Elfyn Evans	Scott Martin	M-Sport Ford WRT	Ford Fiesta WRC	Accident		0	0
Retired SS8		4	Esapekka Lappi	Janne Ferm	Citroën Total WRT	Citroën C3 WRC	Accident		0	0

==== Special stages ====
Date	No.	Stage name	Distance	Winners	Car	Time	Class leaders
25 April	—	Villa Carlos Paz [Shakedown]	4.25 km	Tänak / Järveoja	Toyota Yaris WRC	2:34.9	—N/a
25 April	SS1	SSS Villa Carlos Paz	1.90 km	Tänak / Järveoja	Toyota Yaris WRC	1:58.6	Tänak / Järveoja
26 April	SS2	Las Bajadas / Villa del Dique 1	16.65 km	Meeke / Marshall	Toyota Yaris WRC	9:19.1	Tänak / Järveoja
26 April	SS3	Amboy / Yacanto 1	29.85 km	Stage cancelled (Note: SS3 cancelled due to the weather.)			
26 April	SS4	Santa Rosa / San Agustin 1	23.44 km	Neuville / Gilsoul	Hyundai i20 Coupe WRC	14:05.5	Meeke / Marshall
26 April	SS5	SSS Parque Tematico 1	6.04 km	Mikkelsen / Jæger-Amland	Hyundai i20 Coupe WRC	4:45.4	Meeke / Marshall
26 April	SS6	Las Bajadas / Villa del Dique 2	16.65 km	Tänak / Järveoja	Toyota Yaris WRC	9:09.7	Meeke / Marshall
26 April	SS7	Amboy / Yacanto 2	29.85 km	Tänak / Järveoja	Toyota Yaris WRC	17:38.5	Tänak / Järveoja
26 April	SS8	Santa Rosa / San Agustin 2	23.44 km	Neuville / Gilsoul	Hyundai i20 Coupe WRC	13:47.6	Neuville / Gilsoul
27 April	SS9	Tanti — Mataderos 1	13.92 km	Neuville / Gilsoul	Hyundai i20 Coupe WRC	9:08.1	Neuville / Gilsoul
27 April	SS10	Mataderos — Cuchilla Nevada 1	22.67 km	Tänak / Järveoja	Toyota Yaris WRC	11:56.1	Neuville / Gilsoul
27 April	SS11	Cuchilla Nevada — Characato 1	33.65 km	Tänak / Järveoja	Toyota Yaris WRC	19:45.8	Neuville / Gilsoul
27 April	SS12	SSS Parque Tematico 2	6.04 km	Mikkelsen / Jæger-Amland	Hyundai i20 Coupe WRC	4:41.3	Neuville / Gilsoul
27 April	SS13	Tanti — Mataderos 2	13.92 km	Ogier / Ingrassia	Citroën C3 WRC	8:59.9	Neuville / Gilsoul
27 April	SS14	Mataderos — Cuchilla Nevada 2	22.67 km	Ogier / Ingrassia	Citroën C3 WRC	11:44.4	Neuville / Gilsoul
27 April	SS15	Cuchilla Nevada — Characato 2	33.65 km	Mikkelsen / Jæger-Amland	Hyundai i20 Coupe WRC	19:34.5	Neuville / Gilsoul
28 April	SS16	Copina — El Cóndor	16.43 km	Meeke / Marshall	Toyota Yaris WRC	13:08.2	Neuville / Gilsoul
28 April	SS17	Mina Clavero — Giulio Cesare	20.30 km	Neuville / Gilsoul	Hyundai i20 Coupe WRC	17:02.6	Neuville / Gilsoul
28 April	SS18	El Cóndor [Power Stage]	16.43 km	Ogier / Ingrassia	Citroën C3 WRC	13:02.1	Neuville / Gilsoul

==== Championship standings ====
Pos.	Drivers' championships			Co-drivers' championships			Manufacturers' championships		
Pos.	Move	Driver	Points	Move	Co-driver	Points	Move	Manufacturer	Points
1		Thierry Neuville	110		Nicolas Gilsoul	110		Hyundai Shell Mobis WRT	157
2		Sébastien Ogier	100		Julien Ingrassia	100	1	Toyota Gazoo Racing WRT	120
3		Ott Tänak	82		Martin Järveoja	82	1	Citroën Total WRT	117
4	1	Kris Meeke	54	1	Sebastian Marshall	54		M-Sport Ford WRT	78
5	1	Elfyn Evans	43	1	Scott Martin	43			

=== World Rally Championship-2 Pro ===
Mads Østberg comfortably led the rally despite a puncture, over four minutes ahead of eighteen-year-old driver Marco Bulacia Wilkinson, who won all three afternoon stages. Gus Greensmith failed to complete the first leg with a broken front suspension. In the end, Østberg comfortably won his second victory of the season, following by Greensmith, who re-join the rally on Saturday. Bulacia Wilkinson rolled his Fabia at the opening stage, which forced to retire from the rally in leg two.

==== Classification ====
Position		No.	Driver	Co-driver	Entrant	Car	Time	Difference	Points	
Event	Class	No.	Driver	Co-driver	Entrant	Car	Time	Difference	Class	Event
9	1	22	Mads Østberg	Torstein Eriksen	Citroën Total	Citroën C3 R5	3:35:23.1	0.0	**25**	**2**
15	2	21	Gus Greensmith	Elliott Edmondson	M-Sport Ford WRT	Ford Fiesta R5	3:56:25.4	+21:02.3	**18**	**0**
Retired SS9		23	Marco Bulacia Wilkinson	Fabian Cretu	Škoda Motorsport	Škoda Fabia R5	Rolled		**0**	**0**

==== Special stages ====
Results in bold denote first in the RC2 class, the class which both the WRC-2 Pro and WRC-2 championships run to.

Date	No.	Stage name	Distance	Winners	Car	Time	Class leaders
25 April	—	Villa Carlos Paz [Shakedown]	4.25 km	**Østberg / Eriksen**	Citroën C3 R5	2:47.0	—N/a
25 April	SS1	SSS Villa Carlos Paz	1.90 km	Greensmith / Edmondson	Ford Fiesta R5	2:03.2	Greensmith / Edmondson
26 April	SS2	Las Bajadas / Villa del Dique 1	16.65 km	**Østberg / Eriksen**	Citroën C3 R5	9:57.9	Østberg / Eriksen
26 April	SS3	Amboy / Yacanto 1	29.85 km	Stage cancelled			
26 April	SS4	Santa Rosa / San Agustin 1	23.44 km	**Østberg / Eriksen**	Citroën C3 R5	15:09.2	Østberg / Eriksen
26 April	SS5	SSS Parque Tematico 1	6.04 km	**Østberg / Eriksen**	Citroën C3 R5	4:58.8	Østberg / Eriksen
26 April	SS6	Las Bajadas / Villa del Dique 2	16.65 km	**Bulacia Wilkinson / Cretu**	Škoda Fabia R5	9:56.6	Østberg / Eriksen
26 April	SS7	Amboy / Yacanto 2	29.85 km	**Bulacia Wilkinson / Cretu**	Škoda Fabia R5	19:28.1	Østberg / Eriksen
26 April	SS8	Santa Rosa / San Agustin 2	23.44 km	**Bulacia Wilkinson / Cretu**	Škoda Fabia R5	15:16.7	Østberg / Eriksen
27 April	SS9	Tanti — Mataderos 1	13.92 km	**Østberg / Eriksen**	Citroën C3 R5	9:38.4	Østberg / Eriksen
27 April	SS10	Mataderos — Cuchilla Nevada 1	22.67 km	**Østberg / Eriksen**	Citroën C3 R5	12:50.2	Østberg / Eriksen
27 April	SS11	Cuchilla Nevada — Characato 1	33.65 km	**Østberg / Eriksen**	Citroën C3 R5	21:24.3	Østberg / Eriksen
27 April	SS12	SSS Parque Tematico 2	6.04 km	**Østberg / Eriksen**	Citroën C3 R5	4:52.9	Østberg / Eriksen
27 April	SS13	Tanti — Mataderos 2	13.92 km	**Østberg / Eriksen**	Citroën C3 R5	9:33.8	Østberg / Eriksen
27 April	SS14	Mataderos — Cuchilla Nevada 2	22.67 km	**Greensmith / Edmondson**	Ford Fiesta R5	12:38.4	Østberg / Eriksen
27 April	SS15	Cuchilla Nevada — Characato 2	33.65 km	**Greensmith / Edmondson**	Ford Fiesta R5	20:52.8	Østberg / Eriksen
28 April	SS16	Copina — El Cóndor	16.43 km	**Greensmith / Edmondson**	Ford Fiesta R5	13:54.0	Østberg / Eriksen
28 April	SS17	Mina Clavero — Giulio Cesare	20.30 km	**Østberg / Eriksen**	Citroën C3 R5	17:59.8	Østberg / Eriksen
28 April	SS18	El Cóndor	16.43 km	**Østberg / Eriksen**	Citroën C3 R5	13:47.6	Østberg / Eriksen

==== Championship standings ====
Pos.	Drivers' championships			Co-drivers' championships			Manufacturers' championships		
Pos.	Move	Driver	Points	Move	Co-driver	Points	Move	Manufacturer	Points
1		Łukasz Pieniążek	62		Kamil Heller	62		M-Sport Ford WRT	120
2		Gus Greensmith	58		Elliott Edmondson	58	1	Citroën Total	50
3	1	Mads Østberg	50	1	Torstein Eriksen	50	1	Škoda Motorsport	36
4	1	Kalle Rovanperä	36	1	Jonne Halttunen	36			
5		Eerik Pietarinen	0		Juhana Raitanen	0			

=== World Rally Championship-2 ===
The first leg produced four different leaders in progress. Takamoto Katsuta was the first leader, but a puncture and broken wheel rim deposited his Fiesta into a ditch; Kajetan Kajetanowicz was the second leader, but he broke his rear suspension after landing heavily over a jump; Alberto Heller was the third leader, but he stopped in the penultimate test when his Fiesta's engine auxiliary belt broke. Eventually, the fourth leader Pedro Heller topped the category by almost six minutes after a day of attrition. Having a trouble-free Saturday, Pedro took the victory after overcame a big scare that the car stopped less than one kilometer from the finish of the iconic El Condór special stage.

==== Classification ====
Position		No.	Driver	Co-driver	Entrant	Car	Time	Difference	Points	
Event	Class	No.	Driver	Co-driver	Entrant	Car	Time	Difference	Class	Event
10	1	45	Pedro Heller	Marc Martí	Pedro Heller	Ford Fiesta R5	3:41:09.1	0.0	25	1
12	2	41	Benito Guerra	Jaime Zapata	Benito Guerra	Škoda Fabia R5	3:50:43.9	+9:34.8	18	0
13	3	46	Paulo Nobre	Gabriel Morales	Paulo Nobre	Škoda Fabia R5	3:52:20.1	+11:11.0	15	0
14	4	42	Alberto Heller	José Díaz	Alberto Heller	Ford Fiesta R5	3:55:15.1	+14:06.0	12	0
16	5	44	Takamoto Katsuta	Daniel Barritt	Takamoto Katsuta	Ford Fiesta R5	3:59:20.7	+18:11.6	10	0
Retired SS5		43	Kajetan Kajetanowicz	Maciej Szczepaniak	Kajetan Kajetanowicz	Ford Fiesta R5	Suspension		0	0

==== Special stages ====
Results in bold denote first in the RC2 class, the class which both the WRC-2 Pro and WRC-2 championships run to.

Date	No.	Stage name	Distance	Winners	Car	Time	Class leaders
25 April	—	Villa Carlos Paz [Shakedown]	4.25 km	A. Heller / Díaz	Ford Fiesta R5	2:48.9	—N/a
25 April	SS1	SSS Villa Carlos Paz	1.90 km	**Katsuta / Barritt**	Ford Fiesta R5	2:02.4	Katsuta / Barritt
26 April	SS2	Las Bajadas / Villa del Dique 1	16.65 km	Kajetanowicz / Szczepaniak	Volkswagen Polo GTI R5	10:19.8	Kajetanowicz / Szczepaniak
26 April	SS3	Amboy / Yacanto 1	29.85 km	Stage cancelled			
26 April	SS4	Santa Rosa / San Agustin 1	23.44 km	Katsuta / Barritt	Ford Fiesta R5	15:41.5	Katsuta / Barritt
26 April	SS5	SSS Parque Tematico 1	6.04 km	A. Heller / Díaz	Ford Fiesta R5	5:06.5	Katsuta / Barritt
26 April	SS6	Las Bajadas / Villa del Dique 2	16.65 km	P. Heller / Martí	Ford Fiesta R5	10:10.8	A. Heller / Díaz
26 April	SS7	Amboy / Yacanto 2	29.85 km	Katsuta / Barritt	Ford Fiesta R5	19:52.7	Katsuta / Barritt
26 April	SS8	Santa Rosa / San Agustin 2	23.44 km	P. Heller / Martí	Ford Fiesta R5	15:38.4	P. Heller / Martí
27 April	SS9	Tanti — Mataderos 1	13.92 km	Stage interrupted (Note: Marco Bulacia Wilkinson and Fabian Cretu rolled their Škoda Fabia R5, which caused that the test was halted for the following competitors. As a consequence, WRC-2 category crews were received 9:54.0 to their times, while private crews were given 13:20.0.)			
27 April	SS10	Mataderos — Cuchilla Nevada 1	22.67 km	Guerra / Zapata	Škoda Fabia R5	13:03.3	P. Heller / Martí
27 April	SS11	Cuchilla Nevada — Characato 1	33.65 km	P. Heller / Martí	Ford Fiesta R5	21:50.0	P. Heller / Martí
27 April	SS12	SSS Parque Tematico 2	6.04 km	Guerra / Zapata	Škoda Fabia R5	4:57.0	P. Heller / Martí
27 April	SS13	Tanti — Mataderos 2	13.92 km	Katsuta / Barritt	Ford Fiesta R5	9:43.0	P. Heller / Martí
27 April	SS14	Mataderos — Cuchilla Nevada 2	22.67 km	Katsuta / Barritt	Ford Fiesta R5	12:44.6	P. Heller / Martí
27 April	SS15	Cuchilla Nevada — Characato 2	33.65 km	A. Heller / Díaz	Ford Fiesta R5	21:08.6	P. Heller / Martí
28 April	SS16	Copina — El Cóndor	16.43 km	Katsuta / Barritt	Ford Fiesta R5	14:08.4	P. Heller / Martí
28 April	SS17	Mina Clavero — Giulio Cesare	20.30 km	P. Heller / Martí	Ford Fiesta R5	18:10.1	P. Heller / Martí
28 April	SS18	El Cóndor	16.43 km	Katsuta / Barritt	Ford Fiesta R5	14:06.2	P. Heller / Martí

==== Championship standings ====
Pos.	Drivers' championships			Co-drivers' championships		
Pos.	Move	Driver	Points	Move	Co-driver	Points
1	3	Benito Guerra	43	3	Jaime Zapata	43
2	1	Ole Christian Veiby	40	1	Jonas Andersson	40
3	1	Nikolay Gryazin	28	1	Yaroslav Fedorov	28
4	7	Alberto Heller	27	7	José Díaz	27
5	2	Yoann Bonato	25	2	Benjamin Boulloud	25

== Notes ==
Previous rally: 2019 Tour de Corse	2019 FIA World Rally Championship	Next rally: 2019 Rally Chile
Previous rally: 2018 Rally Argentina	2019 Rally Argentina	Next rally: 2021 Rally Argentina; 2020 edition cancelled
