= Nicolas Gilsoul =

Belgian rally co-driver (born 1982)

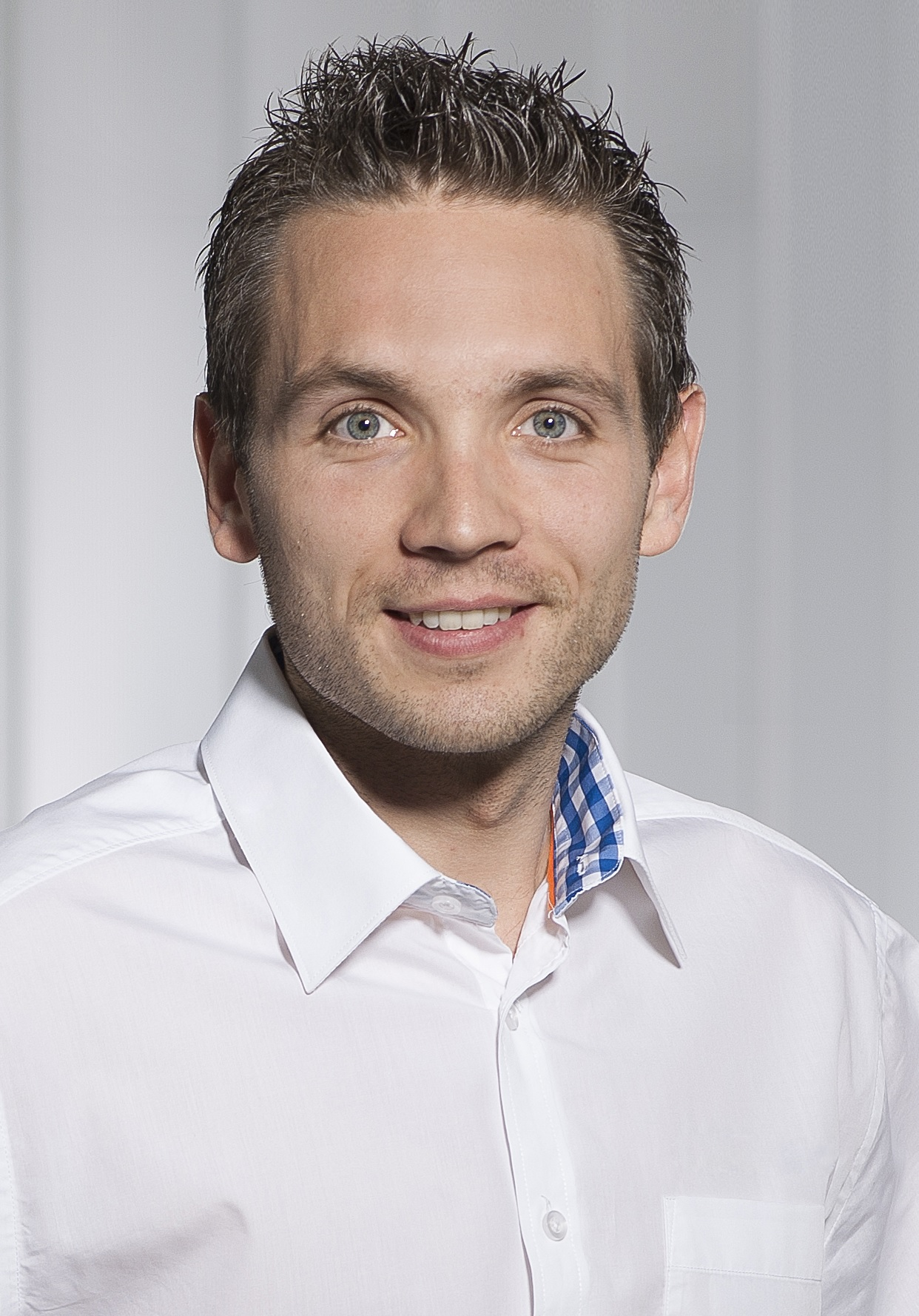
- Nicolas Gilsoul, 2013

Personal information
- Nationality: (Belgium) Belgian
- Full name: Nicolas Yves Elis Gilsoul
- Born: 5 February 1982 (age 44); Chênée, Belgium

World Rally Championship record
- Years active: 2007–2008, 2012–2020, 2022–2023
- Driver: (Belgium) Luc Dewinter (Belgium) Bernard Munster (Belgium) Thierry Neuville (Belgium) Gino Bux (France) Pierre-Louis Loubet
- Teams: Citroën Junior, Qatar, Hyundai
- Rallies: 125
- Championships: 0
- Rally wins: 13
- Podiums: 43
- Stage wins: 245
- First rally: 2007 Monte Carlo Rally
- First win: 2014 Rallye Deutschland
- Last win: 2020 Monte Carlo Rally
- Last rally: 2023 Rally Chile

Nicolas Yves Elis Gilsoul (born 5 February 1982) is a Belgian rally co-driver. He is the former co-driver for Thierry Neuville and the current co-driver for Pierre-Louis Loubet.

== Career ==
After competing in regional events from 2000, Gilsoul made his international debut in 2003 when co-driving with Bruno Thiry. He made his debut in the World Rally Championship in 2007.

Gilsoul started working with Thierry Neuville in 2011 and competed in the 2011 Intercontinental Rally Challenge. In 2012, Gilsoul co-drove for Neuville in the World Rally Championship. The pair went on to drive for the Qatar World Rally Team in 2013 and they were a surprise runners-up in the championship after seven podiums from 13 events. Gilsoul and Neuville made the switch to the newly created rally team Hyundai Motorsport in 2014. He won his first rally in the WRC that year, winning the 2014 Rallye Deutschland, famously after rolling their World Rally Car at the pre-event shakedown.

Gilsoul continued co-driving for Neuville in Hyundai Motorsport and went on to win a further 12 events together. They were runners-up in the championship between 2016 and 2019.

In 2021, right before the season start in the 2021 Monte Carlo Rally, it was announced that Neuville and Gilsoul had stopped their co-operation. Gilsoul was eventually replaced by Martijn Wydaeghe as Neuville's co-driver.

Gilsoul made a return to the co-driving seat in April that year, now for French privateer Paul-Antoine Santoni at the Italian Rally championship round in Rallye Sanremo.

In 2023, Gilsoul returned to the World Rally Championship co-driving for Pierre-Louis Loubet for the M-Sport Ford World Rally Team.

== WRC victories ==
#	Event	Season	Driver	Car
1	(Germany) 32. ADAC Rallye Deutschland	2014	(Belgium) Thierry Neuville	Hyundai i20 WRC
2	(Italy) 13º Rally d'Italia Sardegna	2016	(Belgium) Thierry Neuville	Hyundai i20 WRC
3	60ème Tour de Corse – Rallye de France	2017	(Belgium) Thierry Neuville	Hyundai i20 Coupe WRC
4	37° Rally Argentina	2017	(Belgium) Thierry Neuville	Hyundai i20 Coupe WRC
5	74th Rally Poland	2017	(Belgium) Thierry Neuville	Hyundai i20 Coupe WRC
6	26th Rally Australia	2017	(Belgium) Thierry Neuville	Hyundai i20 Coupe WRC
7	66th Rally Sweden	2018	(Belgium) Thierry Neuville	Hyundai i20 Coupe WRC
8	52° Rally de Portugal	2018	(Belgium) Thierry Neuville	Hyundai i20 Coupe WRC
9	(Italy) 15º Rally d'Italia Sardegna	2018	(Belgium) Thierry Neuville	Hyundai i20 Coupe WRC
10	62ème Tour de Corse – Rallye de France	2019	(Belgium) Thierry Neuville	Hyundai i20 Coupe WRC
11	39° Rally Argentina	2019	(Belgium) Thierry Neuville	Hyundai i20 Coupe WRC
12	(Spain) 55º RallyRACC Catalunya – Costa Daurada	2019	(Belgium) Thierry Neuville	Hyundai i20 Coupe WRC
13	(Monaco) 88ème Rallye Automobile Monte-Carlo	2020	(Belgium) Thierry Neuville	Hyundai i20 Coupe WRC

== Career results ==
=== WRC results ===
Year	Entrant	Car	1	2	3	4	5	6	7	8	9	10	11	12	13	14	15	16	WDC	Points
2007	Luc Dewinter	Mitsubishi Lancer Evolution IX	MON; 28	SWE	NOR	MEX	POR	ARG	ITA	GRE	FIN	GER	NZL	ESP	FRA	JPN	IRE	GBR	NC	0
2008	Bernard Munster	Subaru Impreza STi N14	MON	SWE; 30	MEX	ARG	JOR	ITA	GRE	TUR	FIN	GER	NZL	ESP	FRA	JPN	GBR		NC	0
2012	Citroën Junior World Rally Team	Citroën DS3 WRC	MON; Ret	SWE; 12	MEX; 13	POR; 8	ARG; 5	GRE; 6		FIN; 16	GER; 12	GBR; 7	FRA; 4		ESP; 12				7th	53
2012	Qatar World Rally Team	Citroën DS3 WRC							NZL; 5					ITA; 18					7th	53
2013	Qatar World Rally Team	Ford Fiesta RS WRC	MON; Ret	SWE; 5	MEX; 3	POR; 17	ARG; 5	GRE; 3	ITA; 2	FIN; 2	GER; 2	AUS; 2	FRA; 4	ESP; 4	GBR; 3				2nd	176
2014	Hyundai Shell World Rally Team	Hyundai i20 WRC	MON; Ret	SWE; 28	MEX; 3	POR; 7	ARG; 5	ITA; 16	POL; 3	FIN; Ret	GER; 1	AUS; 7	FRA; 8	ESP; 6	GBR; 4				6th	105
2015	Hyundai Motorsport	Hyundai i20 WRC	MON; 5	SWE; 2	MEX; 8	ARG; Ret	POR; 38	ITA; 3	POL; 6	FIN; 4	GER; 5	AUS; 7	FRA; 23	ESP; 8					6th	90
2015	Hyundai Motorsport N	Hyundai i20 WRC													GBR; Ret				6th	90
2016	Hyundai Motorsport	Hyundai i20 WRC	MON; 3	SWE; 14	MEX; Ret	ARG; 6			POL; 4	FIN; 4	GER; 3	CHN; C	FRA; 2	ESP; 3	GBR; 3	AUS; 3			2nd	160
2016	Hyundai Motorsport N	Hyundai i20 WRC					POR; 29	ITA; 1											2nd	160
2017	Hyundai Motorsport	Hyundai i20 Coupe WRC	MON; 15	SWE; 13	MEX; 3	FRA; 1	ARG; 1	POR; 2	ITA; 3	POL; 1	FIN; 6	GER; 44	ESP; Ret	GBR; 2	AUS; 1				2nd	208
2018	Hyundai Shell Mobis WRT	Hyundai i20 Coupe WRC	MON; 5	SWE; 1	MEX; 6	FRA; 3	ARG; 2	POR; 1	ITA; 1	FIN; 9	GER; 2	TUR; 16	GBR; 5	ESP; 4	AUS; Ret				2nd	201
2019	Hyundai Shell Mobis WRT	Hyundai i20 Coupe WRC	MON; 2	SWE; 3	MEX; 4	FRA; 1	ARG; 1	CHL; Ret	POR; 2	ITA; 6	FIN; 6	GER; 4	TUR; 8	GBR; 2	ESP; 1	AUS; C			2nd	227
2020	Hyundai Shell Mobis WRT	Hyundai i20 Coupe WRC	MON; 1	SWE; 6	MEX; 16	EST; Ret	TUR; 2	ITA; 2	MNZ; Ret										4th	87
2022	East Belgian Racing Team	Škoda Fabia Rally2 evo	MON	SWE	CRO	POR	ITA	KEN	EST	FIN	BEL; 13	GRE	NZL	ESP	JPN				NC	0
2023	M-Sport Ford WRT	Ford Puma Rally1	MON; Ret	SWE; 6	MEX; 27	CRO; 7	POR; 32	ITA; Ret	KEN; 7	EST; 6	FIN; 45	GRE; Ret	CHL; Ret	EUR	JAP				12th	28
