= Teemu Suninen =

Finnish rally driver (born 1994)

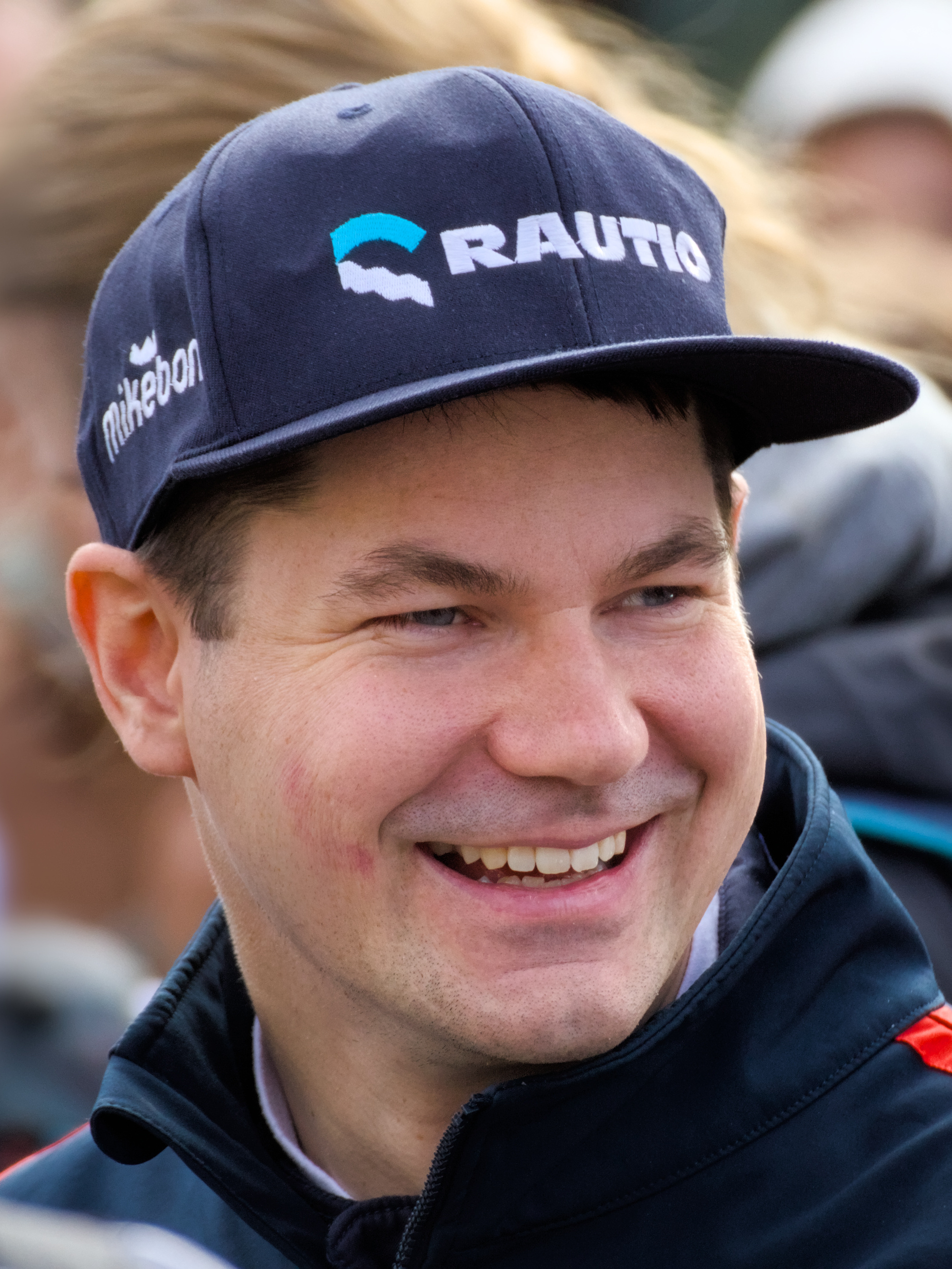
- Suninen at the 2023 Central European Rally

Personal information
- Nationality: (Finland) Finnish
- Full name: Teemu Dani Kristian Suninen
- Born: 1 February 1994 (age 32); Tuusula, Finland

World Rally Championship record
- Years active: 2014–Present
- Co-driver: (Finland) Juha-Pekka Jauhiainen (Finland) Mikko Markkula (Finland) Marko Salminen (Finland) Jarmo Lehtinen (Finland) Janni Hussi
- Teams: Oreca, M-Sport, Hyundai
- Rallies: 80
- Championships: 0
- Rally wins: 0
- Podiums: 3
- Stage wins: 15
- Total points: 304
- First rally: 2014 Rally Finland
- Last rally: 2026 Rally Sweden

FIA European Rallycross Championship
- Years active: 2012
- Car number: 83
- Former teams: SET Promotion
- Starts: 5
- Wins: 1
- Podiums: 3
- Best finish: 8th in 2012 (Super1600)

Teemu Dani Kristian Suninen (Finnish pronunciation: [ˈt̪e̞ːmu ˈsunine̞n]; born 1 February 1994) is a Finnish rally driver. He has competed in the top class in the World Rally Championship (WRC) with M-Sport Ford from 2017 to 2021 and with Hyundai in 2021 and 2023. Suninen won the 2026 European Rally Championship (ERC).

== Rally career ==
Suninen won the WRC-3 class in the 2014 Rally Finland and 2015 Rally Italia Sardegna driving a Citroën DS3 R3T, and won the WRC-2 class in the 2015 Wales Rally GB driving a Škoda Fabia S2000.

Suninen competed full-time at the 2016 World Rally Championship-2 with a Škoda Fabia R5. He won at Mexico with TGS Worldwide, and at Italy and Poland with Oreca, finishing third in the drivers' championship behind Esapekka Lappi and Elfyn Evans.

For the 2017 World Rally Championship-2, Suninen joined M-Sport to drive a Ford Fiesta R5. He scored a win at Spain and three runner-up finishes, ranking third in points behind Pontus Tidemand and Eric Camilli.

Suninen would do a double program with M-Sport in 2018, entering some races with a Ford Fiesta WRC and the rest with a Ford Fiesta R5.

== Racing record ==
=== WRC results ===
Year	Entrant	Car	1	2	3	4	5	6	7	8	9	10	11	12	13	14	Pos.	Points
2014	AKK Sports Team Finland	Citroën DS3 R3T	MON	SWE	MEX	POR	ARG	ITA	POL	FIN; 17	GER	AUS	FRA	ESP	GBR		NC	0
2015	Team Oreca	Citroën DS3 R3T	MON	SWE	MEX	ARG	POR; Ret	ITA; 34		FIN; 54							NC	0
2015	TGS Worldwide	Škoda Fabia S2000							POL; 19						GBR; 11		NC	0
2015	Team Oreca	Ford Fiesta R5									GER; 19	AUS	FRA; 18	ESP; 37			NC	0
2016	Team Oreca	Škoda Fabia R5	MON; 12	SWE; 10		ARG	POR; 46	ITA; 8	POL; 11	FIN; 10	GER; 56	CHN; C	FRA; 15	ESP; 28	GBR; 14	AUS	18th	8
2016	TGS Worldwide	Škoda Fabia R5			MEX; 9												18th	8
2017	M-Sport WRT	Ford Fiesta R5	MON	SWE; 10	MEX	FRA; 8	ARG	POR; 12	ITA			GER; 16	ESP; 8	GBR; 31	AUS		14th	29
2017	M-Sport WRT	Ford Fiesta WRC								POL; 6	FIN; 4						14th	29
2018	M-Sport Ford WRT	Ford Fiesta R5	MON; 18														11th	54
2018	M-Sport Ford WRT	Ford Fiesta WRC		SWE; 8	MEX; 12	FRA	ARG; 9	POR; 3	ITA; 10	FIN; 6	GER; 5	TUR; 4	GBR; Ret	ESP; 11	AUS; Ret		11th	54
2019	M-Sport Ford WRT	Ford Fiesta WRC	MON; 11	SWE; 23	MEX; Ret	FRA; 5	ARG; 7	CHL; 5	POR; 4	ITA; 2	FIN; 8	GER; 29	TUR; 4	GBR; Ret	ESP; 7	AUS; C	9th	89
2020	M-Sport Ford WRT	Ford Fiesta WRC	MON; 8	SWE; 8	MEX; 3	EST; 6	TUR; Ret	ITA; 5	MNZ; Ret								7th	44
2021	M-Sport Ford WRT	Ford Fiesta WRC	MON; Ret	ARC; 8			ITA; 31		EST; 6								11th	29
2021	M-Sport Ford WRT	Ford Fiesta R5 Mk. II			CRO; 10	POR; 8		KEN; WD		BEL; Ret	GRE; WD						11th	29
2021	Movisport	Volkswagen Polo GTI R5										FIN; 8					11th	29
2021	Hyundai Motorsport N	Hyundai i20 N Rally2											ESP; 11				11th	29
2021	Hyundai Shell Mobis WRT	Hyundai i20 Coupe WRC												MNZ; 6			11th	29
2022	Hyundai Motorsport N	Hyundai i20 N Rally2	MON	SWE	CRO	POR; Ret	ITA; 38	KEN	EST; 9	FIN; DSQ	BEL	GRE; 17	NZL	ESP; 11	JPN; 8		20th	9
2023	Hyundai Motorsport N	Hyundai i20 N Rally2	MON	SWE; 15	MEX	CRO	POR; 10	ITA; 6	KEN								9th	42
2023	Hyundai Shell Mobis WRT	Hyundai i20 N Rally1								EST; 5	FIN; 4	GRE	CHL; Ret	EUR; 6	JPN		9th	42
2026	Teemu Suninen	Toyota GR Yaris Rally2	MON	SWE; 11	KEN	CRO	ESP	POR; 10	JPN	GRE	EST; 11	FIN; 10	PAR	CHL	ITA; 13		28th	2

* Season still in progress.

=== WRC-2 results ===
Year	Entrant	Car	1	2	3	4	5	6	7	8	9	10	11	12	13	14	Pos.	Points
2015	TGS Worldwide	Škoda Fabia S2000	MON	SWE	MEX	ARG	POR	ITA	POL; 6	FIN					GBR; 1		10th	51
2015	Team Oreca	Ford Fiesta R5									GER; 6	AUS	FRA; 5	ESP; 13			10th	51
2016	TGS Worldwide	Škoda Fabia R5	MON	SWE	MEX; 1	ARG											3rd	120
2016	Team Oreca	Škoda Fabia R5					POR; 16	ITA; 1	POL; 1	FIN; 2	GER	CHN; C	FRA	ESP; 4	GBR; 3	AUS	3rd	120
2017	M-Sport	Ford Fiesta R5	MON	SWE; 2	MEX	FRA; 2	ARG	POR; 2	ITA	POL	FIN	GER; 7	ESP; 1	GBR; 13	AUS		3rd	85
2018	M-Sport Ford WRT	Ford Fiesta R5	MON; 3	SWE	MEX	FRA	ARG	POR	ITA	FIN	GER	TUR	GBR	ESP	AUS		25th	15
2021	M-Sport Ford WRT	Ford Fiesta R5 Mk. II	MON	ARC	CRO; 2	POR; 2	ITA	KEN; WD	EST	BEL; Ret	GRE; WD						5th	93
2021	Movisport	Volkswagen Polo GTI R5										FIN; 1					5th	93
2021	Hyundai Motorsport N	Hyundai i20 N Rally2											ESP; 2	MNZ			5th	93
2022	Hyundai Motorsport N	Hyundai i20 N Rally2	MON	SWE	CRO	POR; Ret	ITA; 25	KEN	EST; 2	FIN; DSQ	BEL	GRE; 10	NZL	ESP; 1	JPN; 2		6th	68
2023	Hyundai Motorsport N	Hyundai i20 N Rally2	MON	SWE; 6	MEX	CRO	POR; 5	ITA; 2	KEN	EST	FIN	GRE	CHL	EUR	JPN		10th	36
2026	Teemu Suninen	Toyota GR Yaris Rally2	MON	SWE; 2	KEN	CRO	ESP	POR; 1	JPN	GRE	EST; 2	FIN; 2	PAR	CHL	ITA; 6		4th	84

* Season still in progress.

=== WRC-3 results ===
Year	Entrant	Car	1	2	3	4	5	6	7	8	9	10	11	12	13	Pos.	Points
2014	AKK Sports Team Finland	Citroën DS3 R3T	MON	SWE	MEX	POR	ARG	ITA	POL	FIN; 1	GER	AUS	FRA	ESP	GBR	8th	25
2015	Team Oreca	Citroën DS3 R3T	MON	SWE	MEX	ARG	POR; Ret	ITA; 1	POL	FIN; 11	GER	AUS	FRA	ESP	GBR	9th	25

=== Complete FIA European Rallycross Championship results ===
==== JRX Cup ====
Year	Entrant	Car	1	2	3	4	5	ERX	Points
2012	SET Promotion	JRX Renault Clio	SWE; 3	BEL	NED	FIN	GER	6th	15

==== Super1600 ====
Year	Entrant	Car	1	2	3	4	5	6	7	8	9	10	ERX	Points
2012	SET Promotion	Renault Clio	GBR	FRA	AUT	HUN	NOR	SWE	BEL; 6	NED; 5	FIN; 2	GER; 1	8th	60
