= 2018 Rally Mexico =

Motor rally competition

2018 Rally Mexico: 15. Rally Guanajuato Mexico
Round 3 of 13 in the 2018 World Rally Championship
← Previous event	Next event →
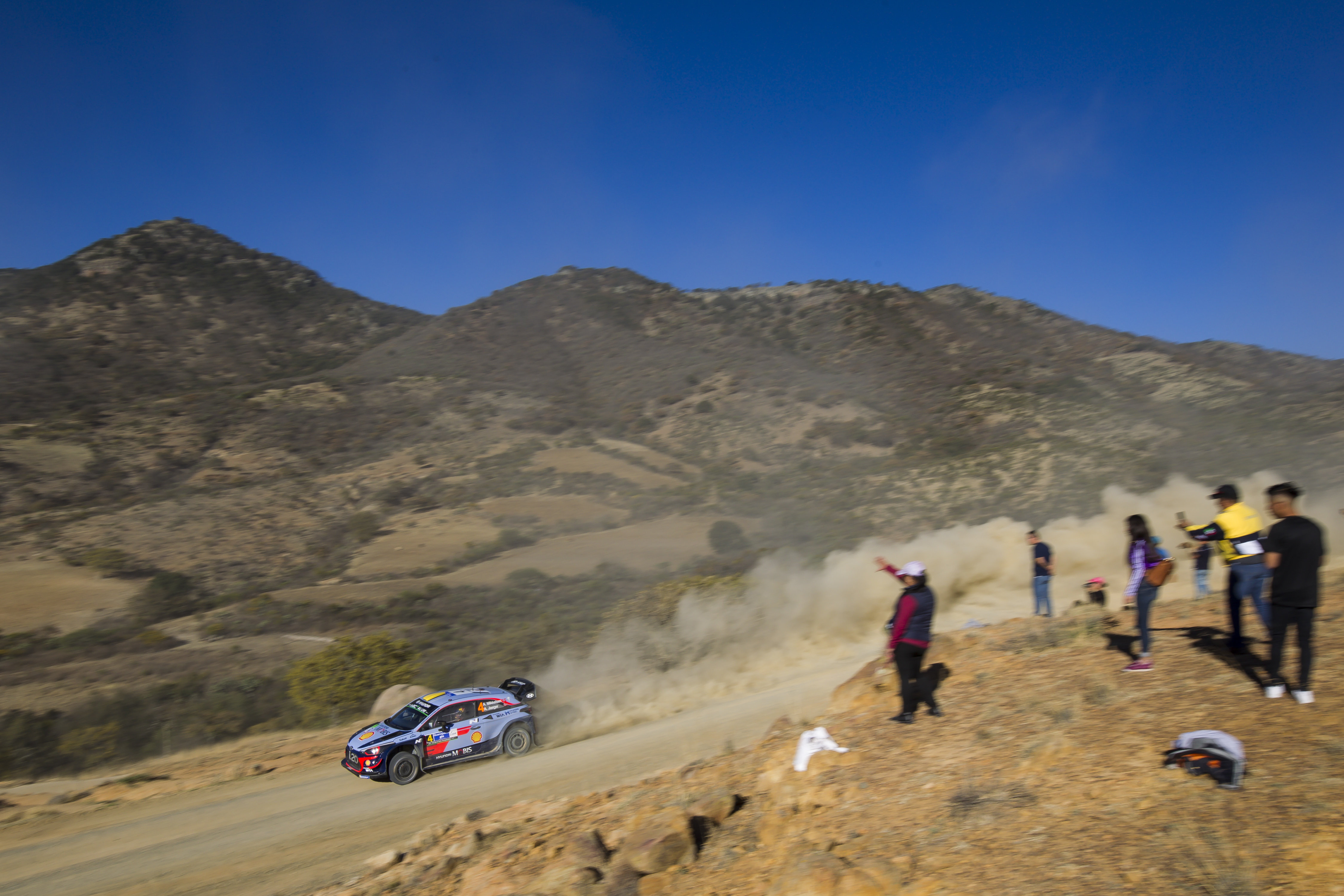
- Andreas Mikkelsen and Anders Jæger-Synnevaag during the event.
- Host country: Mexico
- Rally base: León, Guanajuato
- Dates run: 8 – 11 March 2018
- Start location: Street Stage GTO, Guanajuato
- Finish location: Las Minas, Guanajuato
- Stages: 22 (344.49 km; 214.06 miles)
- Stage surface: Gravel
- Transport distance: 1,055.88 km (656.09 miles)
- Overall distance: 1,400.37 km (870.15 miles)

Statistics
- Crews registered: 31
- Crews: 29 at start, 21 at finish

Overall results
- Overall winner: (France) Sébastien Ogier (France) Julien Ingrassia (United Kingdom) M-Sport Ford WRT; 3:54:08.0
- Power Stage winner: (Estonia) Ott Tänak (Estonia) Martin Järveoja (Japan) Toyota Gazoo Racing WRT

Support category results
- WRC-2 winner: (Sweden) Pontus Tidemand (Sweden) Jonas Andersson (Czech Republic) Škoda Motorsport; 4:04:32.7
- WRC-3 winner: no classified finishers

The 2018 Rally Mexico (formally known as the Rally Guanajuato Mexico 2018) was a motor racing event for rally cars that was held over four days between 8 and 11 March 2018. It marked the fifteenth running of Rally Mexico, and was the third round of the 2018 World Rally Championship and its support categories, the WRC-2 and WRC-3 championships. The event was based in the town of León in Guanajuato, and was contested over twenty-two special stages totalling a competitive distance of 344.49 km (214.06 mi).

Kris Meeke and Paul Nagle were the defending rally winners. Sébastien Ogier and Julien Ingrassia were the rally winners. Their team, M-Sport Ford WRT, were the manufacturers' winners. The Škoda Motorsport crew of Pontus Tidemand and Jonas Andersson won the World Rally Championship-2 category in a Škoda Fabia R5. In the World Rally Championship-3, there were no classified finishers.

== Background ==
=== Championship standings prior to the event ===
Thierry Neuville and Nicolas Gilsoul entered the round with a ten-point lead in the World Championship for Drivers and Co-drivers. In the World Championship for Manufacturers, Hyundai Shell Mobis WRT held a one-point lead over Toyota Gazoo Racing WRT.

=== Entry list ===
The following crews were entered into the rally. The event was open to crews competing in the World Rally Championship, World Rally Championship-2, and the World Rally Championship-3. The final entry list consisted of eleven World Rally Cars, seven World Rally Championship-2 entries, and one World Rally Championship-3 entry.

No.	Entrant	Driver	Co-Driver	Car	Tyre
World Rally Car entries
1	(United Kingdom) M-Sport Ford WRT	(France) Sébastien Ogier	(France) Julien Ingrassia	Ford Fiesta WRC	M
2	(United Kingdom) M-Sport Ford WRT	(United Kingdom) Elfyn Evans	(United Kingdom) Daniel Barritt	Ford Fiesta WRC	M
3	(United Kingdom) M-Sport Ford WRT	(Finland) Teemu Suninen	(Finland) Mikko Markkula	Ford Fiesta WRC	M
4	(South Korea) Hyundai Shell Mobis WRT	(Norway) Andreas Mikkelsen	(Norway) Anders Jæger-Synnevaag	Hyundai i20 Coupe WRC	M
5	(South Korea) Hyundai Shell Mobis WRT	(Belgium) Thierry Neuville	(Belgium) Nicolas Gilsoul	Hyundai i20 Coupe WRC	M
6	(South Korea) Hyundai Shell Mobis WRT	(Spain) Dani Sordo	(Spain) Carlos del Barrio	Hyundai i20 Coupe WRC	M
7	(Japan) Toyota Gazoo Racing WRT	(Finland) Jari-Matti Latvala	(Finland) Miikka Anttila	Toyota Yaris WRC	M
8	(Japan) Toyota Gazoo Racing WRT	(Estonia) Ott Tänak	(Estonia) Martin Järveoja	Toyota Yaris WRC	M
9	(Japan) Toyota Gazoo Racing WRT	(Finland) Esapekka Lappi	(Finland) Janne Ferm	Toyota Yaris WRC	M
10	(France) Citroën Total Abu Dhabi WRT	(United Kingdom) Kris Meeke	(Republic of Ireland) Paul Nagle	Citroën C3 WRC	M
11	(France) Citroën Total Abu Dhabi WRT	(France) Sébastien Loeb	(Monaco) Daniel Elena	Citroën C3 WRC	M
World Rally Championship-2 entries
31	(Czech Republic) Škoda Motorsport	(Sweden) Pontus Tidemand	(Sweden) Jonas Andersson	Škoda Fabia R5	M
32	(South Korea) Hyundai Motorsport	(Finland) Jari Huttunen	(Finland) Antti Linnaketo	Hyundai i20 R5	M
33	(Czech Republic) Škoda Motorsport	(Finland) Kalle Rovanperä	(Finland) Jonne Halttunen	Škoda Fabia R5	M
35	(Bolivia) Marco Bulacia Wilkinson	(Bolivia) Marco Bulacia Wilkinson	(Argentina) Fernando Mussano	Ford Fiesta R5	M
36	(Spain) Nil Solans	(Spain) Nil Solans	(Spain) Miquel Ibañez Sotos	Ford Fiesta R5	D
37	(Italy) Motorsport Italia	(Mexico) Benito Guerra (Note: Benito Guerra did not start due to his car being destroyed by a fire in testing prior to the rally.)	(Spain) Borja Rozada	Škoda Fabia R5	P
38	(United Kingdom) Gus Greensmith	(United Kingdom) Gus Greensmith	(United Kingdom) Craig Parry	Ford Fiesta R5	M
39	(Chile) Pedro Heller	(Chile) Pedro Heller	(Argentina) Pablo Olmos	Ford Fiesta R5	M
World Rally Championship-3 entries
61	(United Kingdom) Tom Williams	(United Kingdom) Tom Williams	(United Kingdom) Phil Hall	Ford Fiesta R2T	P

=== Route ===
After starting in Mexico City in 2017, 2018 Rally Mexico returned to its traditional start in Guanajuato. The route featured minor changes and included a new Power Stage.

== Report ==
=== Pre-event ===
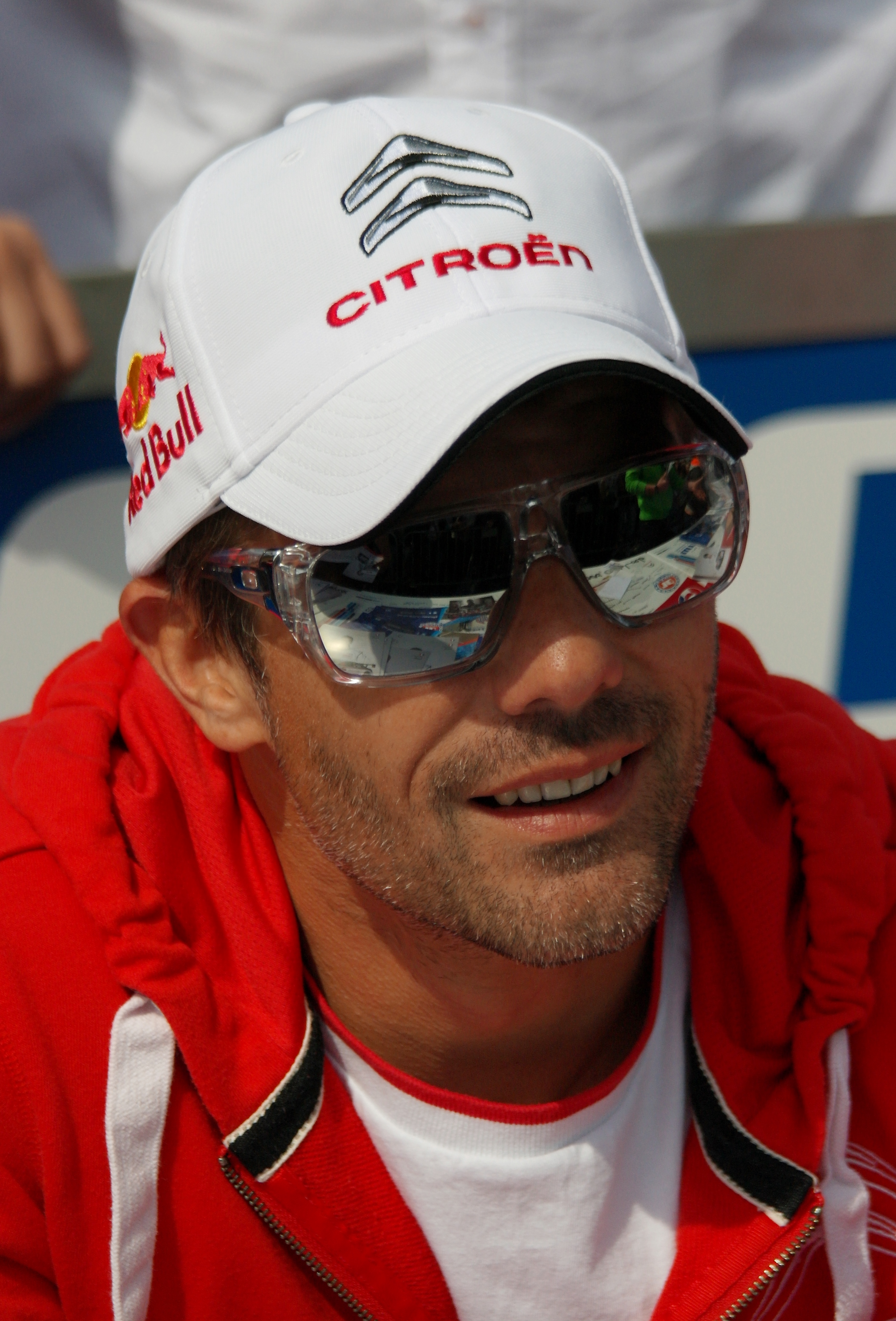
Nine-time World Champion Sébastien Loeb returned to the World Rally Championship in this rally.

The event marks the return of nine-time world champion Sébastien Loeb and is his first rally since the 2015 Monte Carlo Rally.

=== Thursday ===
Thursday saw Thierry Neuville topped his Hyundai i20 after Kris Meeke took the shakedown. Ott Tänak was second on the timesheets, 1.9 seconds slower than the championship leader's storming run. Defending world champion Sébastien Ogier was third, 2 seconds off the lead. Toyota teammates, Jari-Matti Latvala and Esapekka Lappi, and Norwegian Andreas Mikkelsen completed the top six. Last year winner Meeke was seventh overall, followed by Dani Sordo and Elfyn Evans. Nine-time world champion Sébastien Loeb finished his first special stage after 2015 with tenth position.

=== Friday ===
Dani Sordo, who targeted himself for a podium finish, led nine-time world champion Sébastien Loeb by 7.2 seconds after two days. Both drivers benefited from low start positions in the sweltering mountain speed tests above León. Ott Tänak, 11 seconds off the pace in third, drove around overheating problems in his Toyota Yaris, ahead of last year winner Kris Meeke. Defending world champion Sébastien Ogier limited his losses from second in the start order in fifth place, despite a spin. Norwegian Andreas Mikkelsen was sixth, only 1.5 seconds behind the Frenchman. It was a nightmare catastrophe for championship leader Thierry Neuville. The road opener fared worst in the conditions and lost more than 20 seconds due to a fuel pressure problem and a power steering issue in his i20. He placed seventh overall when Jari-Matti Latvala retired with alternator problems before SS9. Elfyn Evans retired from the rally because of rolling out though he managed to reach the finish line, while teammate Teemu Suninen and Esapekka Lappi retired from the day due to hitting a barrier and crashing respectively. WRC 2 leader Pontus Tidemand, Gus Greensmith and Pedro Heller completed the top ten.

=== Saturday ===
Nine-time world champion Sébastien Loeb took an early lead from Dani Sordo, who finished third after the day, until he suffered a front left puncture. The 44-year-old Frenchman conceded almost two and a half minutes when he stopped to change the wheel after hitting a stone in his Citroën C3 and plunged to fifth, while defending world champion Sébastien Ogier took over the lead position with four consecutive stage wins in the afternoon. Teammate Kris Meeke was over half a minute off the pace, second place overall. Ott Tänak's overnight third vanished in the opening stage. The Estonian limped through the second half with a turbo boost problem in his Toyota Yaris and retired soon after, which made Andreas Mikkelsen and championship leader Thierry Neuville climb up to fourth and sixth respectively. WRC 2 leader Pontus Tidemand was seventh, ahead of category second Gus Greensmith. Jari-Matti Latvala returned to the rally after the previous day's alternator-induced retirement. The Toyota leader finished ninth, while Chile's Pedro Heller completed the leaderboard.

=== Sunday ===
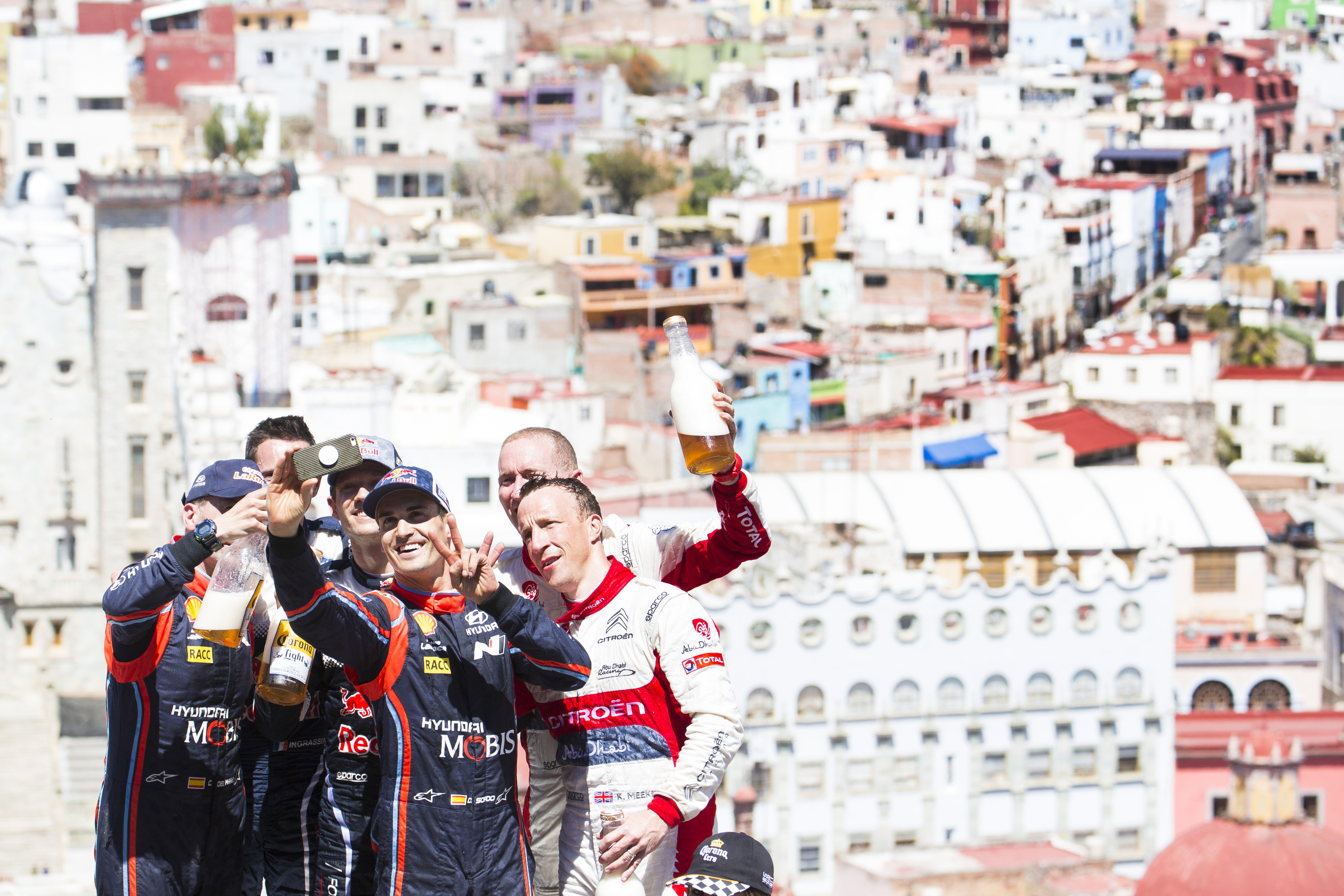
Top three crews were in the self-timer on the podium.

Sébastien Ogier sealed his forty-second career victory, despite receiving a 10-second penalty for cutting a chicane. By virtue this win, he recaptured the position of championship leader from Thierry Neuville, who had a terrible weekend and finished sixth overall. Kris Meeke lost second place to Friday leader Dani Sordo after a half roll this morning. Andreas Mikkelsen finished fourth, a further 19.2 seconds behind, after struggling with his i20's handling throughout. Nine-time champion Sébastien Loeb was fifth and took an extra point at the Power Stage. WRC 2 winner Pontus Tidemand finished seventh ahead of Jari-Matti Latvala, who fought back onto the leaderboard after retiring his Toyota Yaris on Friday with alternator problems. WRC 2 drivers Gus Greensmith and Pedro Heller completed the top ten. Ott Tänak finished fourteenth overall, but he took full five points from the Power Stage.

== Classification ==
=== Top ten finishers ===
The following crews finished the rally in each class's top ten. (Note: Only crews contesting the World Rally Championship, World Rally Championship-2 and World Rally Championship-3 are listed.)

Position		No.	Driver	Co-driver	Entrant	Car	Time	Difference	Points	
Event	Class	No.	Driver	Co-driver	Entrant	Car	Time	Difference	Class	Stage
Overall classification
1	1	1	(France) Sébastien Ogier	(France) Julien Ingrassia	(United Kingdom) M-Sport Ford WRT	Ford Fiesta WRC	3:54:08.0	0.0	25	0
2	2	6	(Spain) Dani Sordo	(Spain) Carlos del Barrio	(South Korea) Hyundai Shell Mobis WRT	Hyundai i20 Coupe WRC	3:55:11.6	+1:03.6	18	0
3	3	10	(United Kingdom) Kris Meeke	(Republic of Ireland) Paul Nagle	(France) Citroën Total Abu Dhabi WRT	Citroën C3 WRC	3:55:27.2	+1:19.2	15	0
4	4	4	(Norway) Andreas Mikkelsen	(Norway) Anders Jæger-Synnevaag	(South Korea) Hyundai Shell Mobis WRT	Hyundai i20 Coupe WRC	3:55:46.4	+1:38.4	12	2
5	5	11	(France) Sébastien Loeb	(Monaco) Daniel Elena	(France) Citroën Total Abu Dhabi WRT	Citroën C3 WRC	3:56:32.6	+2:24.6	10	1
6	6	5	(Belgium) Thierry Neuville	(Belgium) Nicolas Gilsoul	(South Korea) Hyundai Shell Mobis WRT	Hyundai i20 Coupe WRC	4:03:11.0	+9:03.0	8	3
7	7	31	(Sweden) Pontus Tidemand	(Sweden) Jonas Andersson	(Czech Republic) Škoda Motorsport	Škoda Fabia R5	4:04:32.7	+10:24.7	6	0
8	8	7	(Finland) Jari-Matti Latvala	(Finland) Miikka Anttila	(Japan) Toyota Gazoo Racing WRT	Toyota Yaris WRC	4:04:32.7	+15:37.1	4	4
9	9	38	(United Kingdom) Gus Greensmith	(United Kingdom) Craig Parry	(United Kingdom) Gus Greensmith	Ford Fiesta R5	4:11:17.3	+17:09.3	2	0
10	10	39	(Chile) Pedro Heller	(Argentina) Pablo Olmos	(Chile) Pedro Heller	Ford Fiesta R5	4:18:26.1	+24:18.1	1	0
World Rally Championship-2
7	1	31	(Sweden) Pontus Tidemand	(Sweden) Jonas Andersson	(Czech Republic) Škoda Motorsport	Škoda Fabia R5	4:04:32.7	0.0	25	—
9	2	38	(United Kingdom) Gus Greensmith	(United Kingdom) Craig Parry	(United Kingdom) Gus Greensmith	Ford Fiesta R5	4:11:17.3	+6:44.6	18	—
10	3	39	(Chile) Pedro Heller	(Argentina) Pablo Olmos	(Chile) Pedro Heller	Ford Fiesta R5	4:18:26.1	+13:53.4	15	—
13	4	35	(Bolivia) Marco Bulacia Wilkinson	(Argentina) Fernando Mussano	(Bolivia) Marco Bulacia Wilkinson	Ford Fiesta R5	4:27:18.6	+22:45.9	12	—
15	5	33	(Finland) Kalle Rovanperä	(Finland) Jonne Halttunen	(Czech Republic) Škoda Motorsport	Škoda Fabia R5	5:07:26.8	+1:02:54.1	10	—
18	6	32	(Finland) Jari Huttunen	(Finland) Antti Linnaketo	(South Korea) Hyundai Motorsport	Hyundai i20 R5	5:24:46.5	+1:20:13.8	8	—
21	7	36	(Spain) Nil Solans	(Spain) Miquel Ibañez Sotos	(Spain) Nil Solans	Ford Fiesta R5	5:52:32.8	+1:48:00.1	6	—
World Rally Championship-3
No classified finishers

=== Other notable finishers ===
The following notable crews finished the rally outside top ten.

Position		No.	Driver	Co-driver	Entrant	Car	Class	Time	Points
Event	Class	No.	Driver	Co-driver	Entrant	Car	Class	Time	Stage
11	11	9	(Finland) Esapekka Lappi	(Finland) Janne Ferm	(Japan) Toyota Gazoo Racing WRT	Toyota Yaris WRC	WRC	4:25:05.8	0
12	12	3	(Finland) Teemu Suninen	(Finland) Mikko Markkula	(United Kingdom) M-Sport Ford WRT	Ford Fiesta WRC	WRC	4:27:14.3	0
14	14	8	(Estonia) Ott Tänak	(Estonia) Martin Järveoja	(Japan) Toyota Gazoo Racing WRT	Toyota Yaris WRC	WRC	4:56:50.8	5

=== Special stages ===
Overall classification
Day	Stage	Name	Length	Winner	Car	Time	Class leader
8 March	—	Llano Grande [Shakedown]	5.31 km	(United Kingdom) Kris Meeke	Citroën C3 WRC	3:41.0	—N/a
8 March	SS1	Street Stage GTO	2.53 km	(Belgium) Thierry Neuville	Hyundai i20 Coupe WRC	2:06.7	(Belgium) Thierry Neuville
9 March	SS2	Duarte - Derramadero 1	26.05 km	(United Kingdom) Kris Meeke	Citroën C3 WRC	17:08.9	(United Kingdom) Kris Meeke
9 March	SS3	El Chocolate 1	31.44 km	(Spain) Dani Sordo	Hyundai i20 Coupe WRC	24:05.6	(Spain) Dani Sordo
9 March	SS4	Ortega 1	17.23 km	(Spain) Dani Sordo	Hyundai i20 Coupe WRC	9:33.2	(Spain) Dani Sordo
9 March	SS5	Street Stage Léon 1	1.11 km	(Finland) Teemu Suninen	Ford Fiesta WRC	1:03.7	(Spain) Dani Sordo
9 March	SS6	Duarte - Derramadero 2	26.05 km	(United Kingdom) Kris Meeke	Citroën C3 WRC	16:56.7	(Spain) Dani Sordo
9 March	SS7	El Chocolate 2	31.44 km	(France) Sébastien Loeb	Citroën C3 WRC	23:54.2	(Spain) Dani Sordo
9 March	SS8	Ortega 2	17.23 km	(Estonia) Ott Tänak (France) Sébastien Loeb	Toyota Yaris WRC; Citroën C3 WRC	9:24.8	(Spain) Dani Sordo
9 March	SS9	SSS Autodromo de Léon 1	2.3 km	(Estonia) Ott Tänak	Toyota Yaris WRC	1:37.8	(Spain) Dani Sordo
9 March	SS10	SSS Autodromo de Léon 2	2.3 km	(France) Sébastien Ogier (Estonia) Ott Tänak	Ford Fiesta WRC; Toyota Yaris WRC	1:37.3	(Spain) Dani Sordo
10 March
10 March	SS11	Guanajuatito 1	30.97 km	(France) Sébastien Loeb	Citroën C3 WRC	20:35.6	(France) Sébastien Loeb
10 March	SS12	Otates 1	26.37 km	(United Kingdom) Kris Meeke	Citroën C3 WRC	20:26.9	(France) Sébastien Loeb
10 March	SS13	El Brinco 1	9.98 km	(France) Sébastien Ogier	Ford Fiesta WRC	5:29.2	(France) Sébastien Loeb
10 March	SS14	Guanajuatito 2	30.97 km	(France) Sébastien Ogier	Ford Fiesta WRC	20:10.1	(France) Sébastien Ogier
10 March	SS15	Otates 2	26.37 km	(France) Sébastien Ogier	Ford Fiesta WRC	20:05.1	(France) Sébastien Ogier
10 March	SS16	El Brinco 2	9.98 km	(France) Sébastien Ogier	Ford Fiesta WRC	5:24.6	(France) Sébastien Ogier
10 March	SS17	SSS Autodromo de Léon 3	2.3 km	(Spain) Dani Sordo (United Kingdom) Kris Meeke	Hyundai i20 Coupe WRC; Citroën C3 WRC	1:38.0	(France) Sébastien Ogier
10 March	SS18	SSS Autodromo de Léon 4	2.3 km	(United Kingdom) Kris Meeke	Citroën C3 WRC	1:36.6	(France) Sébastien Ogier
10 March	SS19	Street Stage Léon 2	1.11 km	(Norway) Andreas Mikkelsen	Hyundai i20 Coupe WRC	1:02.7	(France) Sébastien Ogier
11 March							(France) Sébastien Ogier
11 March	SS20	Alfaro	24.32 km	(Finland) Jari-Matti Latvala	Toyota Yaris WRC	15:23.7	(France) Sébastien Ogier
11 March	SS21	Las Minas 1	11.07 km	(Estonia) Ott Tänak	Toyota Yaris WRC	6:42.9	(France) Sébastien Ogier
11 March	SS22	Las Minas 2 [Power stage]	11.07 km	(Estonia) Ott Tänak	Toyota Yaris WRC	6:33.1	(France) Sébastien Ogier
World Rally Championship-2
8 March	—	Llano Grande [Shakedown]	5.31 km	(Finland) Kalle Rovanperä	Škoda Fabia R5	3:51.9	—N/a
8 March	SS1	Street Stage GTO	2.53 km	(Sweden) Pontus Tidemand	Škoda Fabia R5	2:11.6	(Sweden) Pontus Tidemand
9 March	SS2	Duarte - Derramadero 1	26.05 km	(Sweden) Pontus Tidemand	Škoda Fabia R5	17:52.9	(Sweden) Pontus Tidemand
9 March	SS3	El Chocolate 1	31.44 km	(Sweden) Pontus Tidemand	Škoda Fabia R5	25:10.4	(Sweden) Pontus Tidemand
9 March	SS4	Ortega 1	17.23 km	(Sweden) Pontus Tidemand	Škoda Fabia R5	10:09.2	(Sweden) Pontus Tidemand
9 March	SS5	Street Stage Leon 1	1.11 km	(Sweden) Pontus Tidemand	Škoda Fabia R5	1:05.5	(Sweden) Pontus Tidemand
9 March	SS6	Duarte - Derramadero 2	26.05 km	(Sweden) Pontus Tidemand	Škoda Fabia R5	17:55.3	(Sweden) Pontus Tidemand
9 March	SS7	El Chocolate 2	31.44 km	(Sweden) Pontus Tidemand	Škoda Fabia R5	25:08.6	(Sweden) Pontus Tidemand
9 March	SS8	Ortega 2	17.23 km	(Sweden) Pontus Tidemand	Škoda Fabia R5	10:01.6	(Sweden) Pontus Tidemand
9 March	SS9	SSS Autodromo de Léon 1	2.3 km	(Sweden) Pontus Tidemand	Škoda Fabia R5	1:43.3	(Sweden) Pontus Tidemand
9 March	SS10	SSS Autodromo de Léon 2	2.3 km	(Sweden) Pontus Tidemand	Škoda Fabia R5	1:42.6	(Sweden) Pontus Tidemand
10 March							(Sweden) Pontus Tidemand
10 March	SS11	Guanajuatito 1	30.97 km	(Finland) Kalle Rovanperä	Škoda Fabia R5	21:27.7	(Sweden) Pontus Tidemand
10 March	SS12	Otates 1	26.37 km	(Sweden) Pontus Tidemand	Škoda Fabia R5	21:12.6	(Sweden) Pontus Tidemand
10 March	SS13	El Brinco 1	9.98 km	(Sweden) Pontus Tidemand	Škoda Fabia R5	5:46.4	(Sweden) Pontus Tidemand
10 March	SS14	Guanajuatito 2	30.97 km	(Finland) Kalle Rovanperä	Škoda Fabia R5	21:13.9	(Sweden) Pontus Tidemand
10 March	SS15	Otates 2	26.37 km	(Finland) Kalle Rovanperä	Škoda Fabia R5	21:03.2	(Sweden) Pontus Tidemand
10 March	SS16	El Brinco 2	9.98 km	(Sweden) Pontus Tidemand	Škoda Fabia R5	5:44.1	(Sweden) Pontus Tidemand
10 March	SS17	SSS Autodromo de Léon 3	2.3 km	(Sweden) Pontus Tidemand	Škoda Fabia R5	1:41.9	(Sweden) Pontus Tidemand
10 March	SS18	SSS Autodromo de Léon 4	2.3 km	(Sweden) Pontus Tidemand	Škoda Fabia R5	1:41.6	(Sweden) Pontus Tidemand
10 March	SS19	Street Stage Léon 2	1.11 km	(Finland) Kalle Rovanperä	Škoda Fabia R5	1:05.1	(Sweden) Pontus Tidemand
11 March							(Sweden) Pontus Tidemand
11 March	SS20	Alfaro	24.32 km	(Sweden) Pontus Tidemand	Škoda Fabia R5	16:05.1	(Sweden) Pontus Tidemand
11 March	SS21	Las Minas 1	11.07 km	(Sweden) Pontus Tidemand	Škoda Fabia R5	7:03.6	(Sweden) Pontus Tidemand
11 March	SS22	Las Minas 2	11.07 km	(Finland) Kalle Rovanperä	Škoda Fabia R5	6:52.3	(Sweden) Pontus Tidemand
World Rally Championship-3
8 March	—	Llano Grande [Shakedown]	5.31 km	(United Kingdom) Tom Williams	Ford Fiesta R2T	5:19.5	—N/a
8 March	SS1	Street Stage GTO	2.53 km	(United Kingdom) Tom Williams	Ford Fiesta R2T	2:38.6	(United Kingdom) Tom Williams
9 March	SS2	Duarte - Derramadero 1	26.05 km	(United Kingdom) Tom Williams	Ford Fiesta R2T	22:47.6	(United Kingdom) Tom Williams
9 March	SS3	El Chocolate 1	31.44 km	(United Kingdom) Tom Williams	Ford Fiesta R2T	30:36.7	(United Kingdom) Tom Williams
9 March	SS4	Ortega 1	17.23 km	(United Kingdom) Tom Williams	Ford Fiesta R2T	12:21.2	(United Kingdom) Tom Williams
9 March	SS5	Street Stage Leon 1	1.11 km	(United Kingdom) Tom Williams	Ford Fiesta R2T	1:17.8	(United Kingdom) Tom Williams
9 March	SS6	Duarte - Derramadero 2	26.05 km	(United Kingdom) Tom Williams	Ford Fiesta R2T	29:47.6	(United Kingdom) Tom Williams
9 March	SS7	El Chocolate 2	31.44 km	(United Kingdom) Tom Williams	Ford Fiesta R2T	37:36.7	(United Kingdom) Tom Williams
9 March	SS8	Ortega 2	17.23 km	(United Kingdom) Tom Williams	Ford Fiesta R2T	19:21.2	(United Kingdom) Tom Williams
9 March	SS9	SSS Autodromo de Léon 1	2.3 km	(United Kingdom) Tom Williams	Ford Fiesta R2T	9:12.4	(United Kingdom) Tom Williams
9 March	SS10	SSS Autodromo de Léon 2	2.3 km	(United Kingdom) Tom Williams	Ford Fiesta R2T	9:03.8	(United Kingdom) Tom Williams
10 March							(United Kingdom) Tom Williams
10 March	SS11	Guanajuatito 1	30.97 km	(United Kingdom) Tom Williams	Ford Fiesta R2T	26:16.9	(United Kingdom) Tom Williams
10 March	SS12	Otates 1	26.37 km	(United Kingdom) Tom Williams	Ford Fiesta R2T	25:26.1	(United Kingdom) Tom Williams
10 March	SS13	El Brinco 1	9.98 km	(United Kingdom) Tom Williams	Ford Fiesta R2T	7:06.4	(United Kingdom) Tom Williams
10 March	SS14	Guanajuatito 2	30.97 km	(United Kingdom) Tom Williams	Ford Fiesta R2T	26:26.9	(United Kingdom) Tom Williams
10 March	SS15	Otates 2	26.37 km	(United Kingdom) Tom Williams	Ford Fiesta R2T	25:29.4	(United Kingdom) Tom Williams
10 March	SS16	El Brinco 2	9.98 km	(United Kingdom) Tom Williams	Ford Fiesta R2T	6:56.2	(United Kingdom) Tom Williams
10 March	SS17	SSS Autodromo de Léon 3	2.3 km	(United Kingdom) Tom Williams	Ford Fiesta R2T	2:02.5	(United Kingdom) Tom Williams
10 March	SS18	SSS Autodromo de Léon 4	2.3 km	(United Kingdom) Tom Williams	Ford Fiesta R2T	2:01.1	(United Kingdom) Tom Williams
10 March	SS19	Street Stage Léon 2	1.11 km	(United Kingdom) Tom Williams	Ford Fiesta R2T	2:41.2	(United Kingdom) Tom Williams
11 March							(United Kingdom) Tom Williams
11 March	SS20	Alfaro	24.32 km	(United Kingdom) Tom Williams	Ford Fiesta R2T	21:26.2	(United Kingdom) Tom Williams
11 March	SS21	Las Minas 1	11.07 km	(United Kingdom) Tom Williams	Ford Fiesta R2T	35:35.1	(United Kingdom) Tom Williams
11 March	SS22	Las Minas 2	11.07 km	No stage-winner		—N/a	No leader

=== Power stage ===
The Power stage was an 11.07 km stage at the end of the rally. Additional World Championship points were awarded to the five fastest crews.

Pos.	Driver	Co-driver	Car	Time	Diff.	Pts.
1	(Estonia) Ott Tänak	(Estonia) Martin Järveoja	Toyota Yaris WRC	6:33.1	0.0	5
2 (Note: Sebastien Ogier originally finished the Power Stage in second place, but received a 10-second penalty for cutting a chicane.)	(Finland) Jari-Matti Latvala	(Finland) Miikka Anttila	Toyota Yaris WRC	6:34.4	+1.3	4
3	(Belgium) Thierry Neuville	(Belgium) Nicolas Gilsoul	Hyundai i20 Coupe WRC	6:34.5	+1.4	3
4	(Norway) Andreas Mikkelsen	(Norway) Anders Jæger-Synnevaag	Hyundai i20 Coupe WRC	6:36.0	+2.9	2
5	(France) Sébastien Loeb	(Monaco) Daniel Elena	Citroën C3 WRC	6:38.9	+5.8	1

=== Penalties ===
The following notable crews were given time penalty during the rally.

Stage	No.	Driver	Co-driver	Entrant	Car	Class	Reason	Penalty
SS13	35	(Bolivia) Marco Bulacia Wilkinson	(Argentina) Fernando Mussano	(Bolivia) Marco Bulacia Wilkinson	Ford Fiesta R5	WRC-2	6 minutes late	1:00
SS22	1	(France) Sébastien Ogier	(France) Julien Ingrassia	(United Kingdom) M-Sport Ford WRT	Ford Fiesta WRC	WRC	Cutting a chicane	0:10
SS22	5	(Belgium) Thierry Neuville	(Belgium) Nicolas Gilsoul	(South Korea) Hyundai Shell Mobis WRT	Hyundai i20 Coupe WRC	WRC	25 minutes late	4:10
SS22	8	(Estonia) Ott Tänak	(Estonia) Martin Järveoja	(Japan) Toyota Gazoo Racing WRT	Toyota Yaris WRC	WRC	27 minutes late	4:30

=== Retirements ===
The following notable crews retired from the event. Under Rally2 regulations, they were eligible to re-enter the event starting from the next leg. Crews that re-entered were given an additional time penalty.

Stage	No.	Driver	Co-driver	Entrant	Car	Class	Cause	Re-entry
SS2	33	(Finland) Kalle Rovanperä	(Finland) Jonne Halttunen	(Czech Republic) Škoda Motorsport	Škoda Fabia R5	WRC-2	Mechanical	Yes
SS2	36	(Spain) Nil Solans	(Spain) Miquel Ibañez Sotos	(Spain) Nil Solans	Ford Fiesta R5	WRC-2	Mechanical	Yes
SS5	2	(United Kingdom) Elfyn Evans	(United Kingdom) Daniel Barritt	(United Kingdom) M-Sport Ford WRT	Ford Fiesta WRC	WRC	Accident	No
SS6	32	(Finland) Jari Huttunen	(Finland) Antti Linnaketo	(South Korea) Hyundai Motorsport	Hyundai i20 R5	WRC-2	Mechanical	Yes
SS6	61	(United Kingdom) Tom Williams	(United Kingdom) Phil Hall	(United Kingdom) Tom Williams	Ford Fiesta R2T	WRC-3	Mechanical	Yes
SS7	9	(Finland) Esapekka Lappi	(Finland) Janne Ferm	(Japan) Toyota Gazoo Racing WRT	Toyota Yaris WRC	WRC	Off-road	Yes
SS7	3	(Finland) Teemu Suninen	(Finland) Mikko Markkula	(United Kingdom) M-Sport Ford WRT	Ford Fiesta WRC	WRC	Suspension	Yes
SS8	7	(Finland) Jari-Matti Latvala	(Finland) Miikka Anttila	(Japan) Toyota Gazoo Racing WRT	Toyota Yaris WRC	WRC	Alternator	Yes
SS12	8	(Estonia) Ott Tänak	(Estonia) Martin Järveoja	(Japan) Toyota Gazoo Racing WRT	Toyota Yaris WRC	WRC	Engine	Yes
SS14	32	(Finland) Jari Huttunen	(Finland) Antti Linnaketo	(South Korea) Hyundai Motorsport	Hyundai i20 R5	WRC-2	Mechanical	Yes
SS14	36	(Spain) Nil Solans	(Spain) Miquel Ibañez Sotos	(Spain) Nil Solans	Ford Fiesta R5	WRC-2	Mechanical	Yes
SS19	61	(United Kingdom) Tom Williams	(United Kingdom) Phil Hall	(United Kingdom) Tom Williams	Ford Fiesta R2T	WRC-3	Mechanical	Yes
SS22	61	(United Kingdom) Tom Williams	(United Kingdom) Phil Hall	(United Kingdom) Tom Williams	Ford Fiesta R2T	WRC-3	Mechanical	No

=== Championship standings after the rally ===
==== Drivers' championships ====
World Rally Championship
	Pos.	Driver	Points
1	1	(France) Sébastien Ogier	56
1	2	(Belgium) Thierry Neuville	52
3	3	(Norway) Andreas Mikkelsen	35
4	4	(United Kingdom) Kris Meeke	32
2	5	(Finland) Jari-Matti Latvala	31
World Rally Championship-2
	Pos.	Driver	Points
3	1	(Sweden) Pontus Tidemand	43
1	2	(Czech Republic) Jan Kopecký	25
1	3	(Japan) Takamoto Katsuta	25
1	4	(Italy) Eddie Sciessere	18
	5	(United Kingdom) Gus Greensmith	18
World Rally Championship-3
	Pos.	Driver	Points
	1	(Italy) Enrico Brazzoli	25
	2	(Sweden) Denis Rådström	25
	3	(Finland) Taisko Lario	19
	4	(Belgium) Amaury Molle	18
	5	(Sweden) Emil Bergkvist	18

==== Co-Drivers' championships ====
World Rally Championship
	Pos.	Co-Driver	Points
1	1	(France) Julien Ingrassia	56
1	2	(Belgium) Nicolas Gilsoul	52
3	3	(Norway) Anders Jæger-Synnevaag	35
4	4	(Republic of Ireland) Paul Nagle	32
2	5	(Finland) Miikka Anttila	31
World Rally Championship-2
	Pos.	Co-Driver	Points
3	1	(Sweden) Jonas Andersson	43
1	2	(Czech Republic) Pavel Dresler	25
1	3	(Finland) Marko Salminen	25
1	4	(Italy) Flavio Zanella	18
	5	(United Kingdom) Craig Parry	18
World Rally Championship-3
	Pos.	Co-Driver	Points
	1	(Italy) Luca Beltrame	25
	2	(Sweden) Johan Johansson	25
	3	(Finland) Tatu Hämäläinen	19
	4	(Belgium) Renaud Herman	18
	5	(Norway) Ola Fløene	18

==== Manufacturers' and teams' championships ====
World Rally Championship
	Pos.	Manufacturer	Points
	1	(South Korea) Hyundai Shell Mobis WRT	84
2	2	(United Kingdom) M-Sport Ford WRT	72
	3	(France) Citroën Total Abu Dhabi WRT	71
2	4	(Japan) Toyota Gazoo Racing WRT	67
World Rally Championship-2
	Pos.	Team	Points
3	1	(Czech Republic) Škoda Motorsport	43
4	2	(South Korea) Hyundai Motorsport	30
2	3	(Czech Republic) Škoda Motorsport II	25
2	4	(Finland) Tommi Mäkinen Racing	25
2	5	(United Kingdom) M-Sport Ford WRT	18
World Rally Championship-3
	Pos.	Team	Points
	1	(Germany) ADAC Sachsen	25
	2	(Poland) Go+Cars Atlas Ward	18
	3	(Italy) ACI Team Italia	15
	4	(Estonia) OT Racing	12

== Notes ==
Previous rally: 2018 Rally Sweden	2018 FIA World Rally Championship	Next rally: 2018 Tour de Corse
Previous rally: 2017 Rally Mexico	2018 Rally Mexico	Next rally: 2019 Rally Mexico
