= Aaron Johnston (co-driver) =

British-Irish rally co-driver (born 1995)

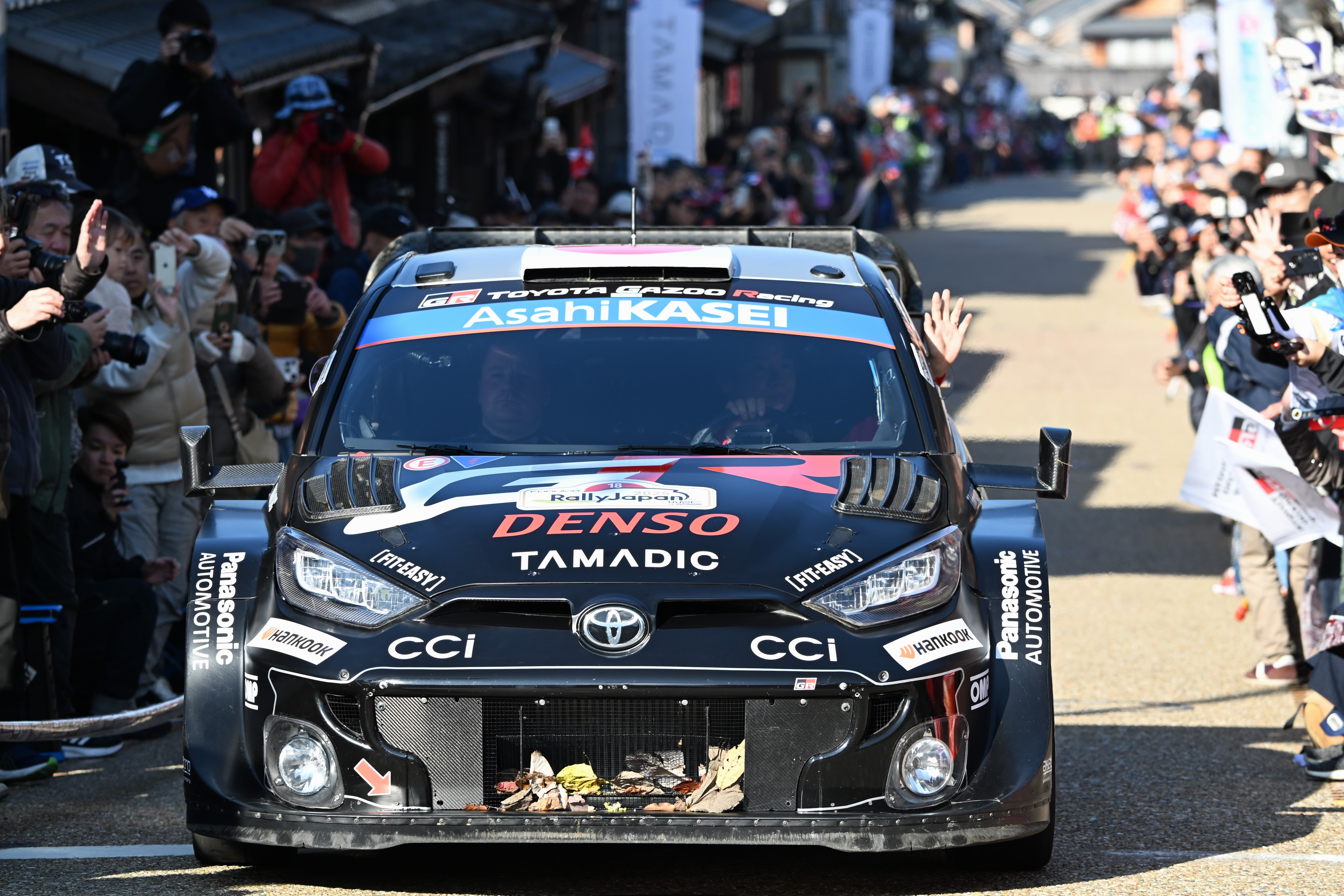
- Johnston at the 2025 Rally Japan

Personal information
- Nationality: (United Kingdom) British (Republic of Ireland) Irish
- Full name: Aaron Robert Johnston
- Born: 2 February 1995 (age 31); Omagh, Northern Ireland

World Rally Championship record
- Years active: 2019–present
- Driver: (Sweden) Oliver Solberg (Japan) Takamoto Katsuta
- Rallies: 57
- Championships: 0
- Rally wins: 2
- Podiums: 5
- Stage wins: 45
- Total points: 384
- First rally: 2019 Wales Rally GB
- First win: 2026 Safari Rally
- Last win: 2026 Croatia Rally
- Last rally: 2026 Rally Italia Sardegna

Aaron Robert Johnston (born 2 February 1995) is a British-Irish rally co-driver. He is currently partnered with Takamoto Katsuta for Toyota Gazoo Racing WRT in the World Rally Championship.

== Rally career ==
Johnston's rally career began at the age of sixteen. At the 2019 Wales Rally GB, he made his WRC debut by co-driving with Oliver Solberg in a Volkswagen Polo GTI R5 in the WRC-2 category. Both Johnston and Solberg were signed by Hyundai Motorsport to compete for the 2021 World Rally Championship-2.

On 16 September 2021, Johnston and Solberg announce their split after three years of collaboration. Just five days later on 21 September, Johnston announced he would partner Japanese driver Takamoto Katsuta for the 2021 Rally Finland, replacing the injured Daniel Barrit.

== Rally victories ==
=== ERC victories ===
#	Event	Season	Driver	Car
1	(Latvia) 7th Rally Liepāja	2019	(Sweden) Oliver Solberg	Volkswagen Polo GTI R5
2	(Latvia) 8th Rally Liepāja	2020	(Sweden) Oliver Solberg	Volkswagen Polo GTI R5

== Rally record ==
=== WRC results ===
Year	Entrant	Car	1	2	3	4	5	6	7	8	9	10	11	12	13	14	WDC	Points
2019	Oliver Solberg	Volkswagen Polo GTI R5	MON	SWE	MEX	FRA	ARG	CHL	POR	ITA	FIN	GER	TUR	GBR; Ret	ESP	AUS; C	NC	0
2020	Oliver Solberg	Volkswagen Polo GTI R5	MON; 25		MEX; Ret	EST; 9	TUR										17th	8
2020	Oliver Solberg	Škoda Fabia R5 Evo		SWE; 17				ITA; 18	MNZ; 7								17th	8
2021	Hyundai Motorsport N	Hyundai i20 R5	MON; Ret		CRO	POR; 11			EST; Ret								17th	12
2021	Hyundai Motorsport N	Hyundai i20 N Rally2								BEL; Ret	GRE; Ret						17th	12
2021	Hyundai 2C Competition	Hyundai i20 Coupe WRC		ARC; WD			ITA; WD	KEN; Ret									17th	12
2021	Toyota Gazoo Racing WRT	Toyota Yaris WRC										FIN; 37	ESP; 40	MNZ; 7			17th	12
2022	Toyota Gazoo Racing WRT NG	Toyota GR Yaris Rally1	MON; 8	SWE; 4	CRO; 6	POR; 4	ITA; 6	KEN; 3	EST; 5	FIN; 6	BEL; 5	GRE; 6	NZL; Ret	ESP; 7	JPN; 3		5th	122
2023	Toyota Gazoo Racing WRT	Toyota GR Yaris Rally1	MON; 6	SWE; Ret	MEX; 23	CRO; 6	POR; 33	ITA; 40	KEN; 4	EST; 7	FIN; 3	GRE; 6	CHL; 5	EUR; 5	JPN; 5		7th	101
2024	Toyota Gazoo Racing WRT	Toyota GR Yaris Rally1	MON; 7	SWE; 45	KEN; 2	CRO; 5	POR; 29	ITA; 35	POL; 8	LAT; 6	FIN; 41	GRE; 30	CHL; WD	EUR; 4	JPN; 4		6th	116
2025	Toyota Gazoo Racing WRT	Toyota GR Yaris Rally1	MON; Ret	SWE; 2	KEN; Ret	ESP; 4	POR; 5	ITA; 5	GRE; 30	EST; Ret	FIN; 2	PAR; 16	CHL; 7	EUR; 4	JPN; Ret	SAU; 5	6th	122
2026	Toyota Gazoo Racing WRT	Toyota GR Yaris Rally1	MON; 7	SWE; 2	KEN; 1	CRO; 1	ESP; 4	POR; 5	JPN; 4	GRE; 3	EST; 10	FIN; 6	PAR; Ret	CHL; 36	ITA; 6		6th	175

* Season still in progress.

=== WRC-2 results ===
Year	Entrant	Car	1	2	3	4	5	6	7	8	9	10	11	12	13	14	WDC	Points
2019	Oliver Solberg	Volkswagen Polo GTI R5	MON	SWE	MEX	FRA	ARG	CHL	POR	ITA	FIN	GER	TUR	GBR; Ret	ESP	AUS; C	NC	0
2021	Hyundai Motorsport N	Hyundai i20 R5	MON; WD	ARC	CRO	POR; 5	ITA	KEN	EST; Ret								23rd	10
2021	Hyundai Motorsport N	Hyundai i20 N Rally2								BEL; Ret	GRE; Ret	FIN	ESP	MNZ			23rd	10

=== WRC-3 results ===
Year	Entrant	Car	1	2	3	4	5	6	7	WDC	Points
2020	Oliver Solberg	Škoda Fabia R5 Evo	MON	SWE; 5			TUR	ITA; 6	MNZ; 2	4th	61
2020	Oliver Solberg	Volkswagen Polo GTI R5			MEX; Ret	EST; 1				4th	61

=== ERC results ===
Year	Entrant	Car	1	2	3	4	5	6	7	8	WDC	Points
2019	Sports Racing Technologies	Volkswagen Polo GTI R5	PRT	ESP	LAT; 1	POL	ITA	CZE	CYP	HUN	6th	39
2020	Oliver Solberg	Volkswagen Polo GTI R5	ITA; 3	LAT; 1	PRT; 23		ESP; 4				2nd	112
2020	Oliver Solberg	Škoda Fabia R5 Evo				HUN; 4					2nd	112
