= 2020 Rally Estonia =

10th edition of Rally Estonia

2020 Rally Estonia: 10. Rally Estonia
Round 4 of 7 in the 2020 World Rally Championship
← Previous event	Next event →
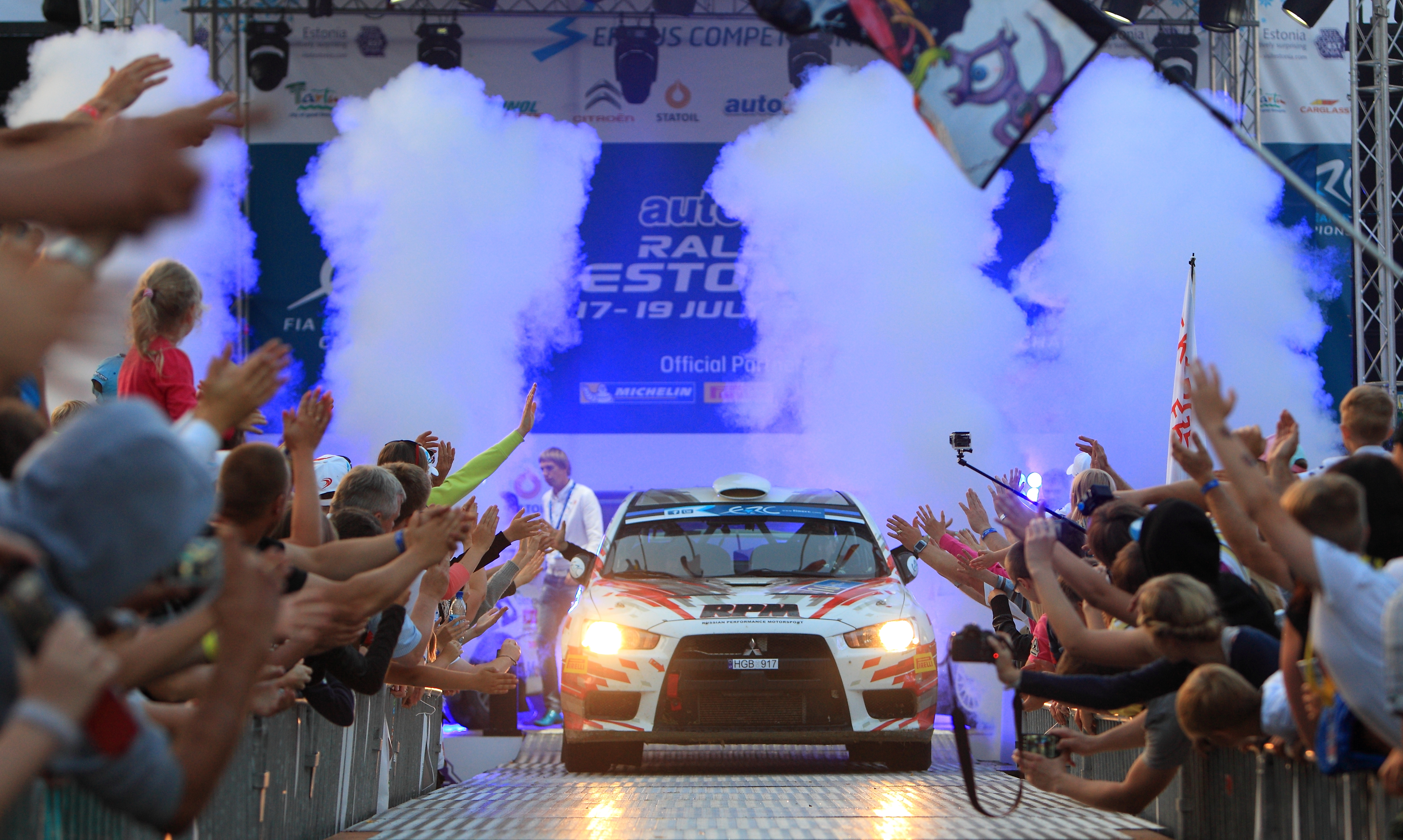
- Estonia became the thirty-third nation to hold a World Rally Championship event.
- Host country: Estonia
- Rally base: Tartu, Tartu County
- Dates run: 4 – 6 September 2020
- Start location: Tartu, Tartu County
- Finish location: Kambja, Tartu County
- Stages: 17 (232.64 km; 144.56 miles)
- Stage surface: Gravel
- Transport distance: 639.25 km (397.21 miles)
- Overall distance: 871.89 km (541.77 miles)

Statistics
- Crews registered: 60
- Crews: 59 at start, 44 at finish

Overall results
- Overall winner: (Estonia) Ott Tänak (Estonia) Martin Järveoja (South Korea) Hyundai Shell Mobis WRT; 1:59:53.6
- Power Stage winner: (Finland) Kalle Rovanperä (Finland) Jonne Halttunen (Japan) Toyota Gazoo Racing WRT; 10:12.4

Support category results
- WRC-2 winner: (Norway) Mads Østberg (Norway) Torstein Eriksen (France) PH-Sport; 2:08:10.9
- WRC-3 winner: (Sweden) Oliver Solberg (Republic of Ireland) Aaron Johnston; 2:07:32.2
- J-WRC winner: (Latvia) Mārtiņš Sesks (Latvia) Renārs Francis (Latvia) LMT Autosporta Akadēmija; 2:21:20.5

The 2020 Rally Estonia (also known as the Rally Estonia 2020) was a motor racing event for rally cars that was held over three days between 4 and 6 September 2020. It marked the tenth running of Rally Estonia and was the fourth round of the 2020 World Rally Championship, World Rally Championship-2 and World Rally Championship-3. The 2020 event was based in the town of Tartu in Tartu County and consisted of seventeen special stages. The rally covered a total competitive distance of 232.64 km (144.56 mi).

The rally marked the return of the FIA World Rally Championship after a half-year hiatus by the COVID-19 pandemic and was the 600th event since the championship was founded back to 1973.

Ott Tänak and Martin Järveoja were the overall winners of the rally, winning their home event for the third straight year. Their team, Hyundai Shell Mobis WRT, were the manufacturers' winners. Mads Østberg and Torstein Eriksen were the winners in the WRC-2 category, while Oliver Solberg and Aaron Johnston won the WRC-3 class. In the junior championship, the Latvian crew of Mārtiņš Sesks and Renārs Francis won the event.

== Background ==
=== Championship standings prior to the event ===
Six-time world champions Sébastien Ogier and Julien Ingrassia entered the round with an eight-point lead over Elfyn Evans and Scott Martin. Thierry Neuville and Nicolas Gilsoul were third, a further twelve points behind. In the World Rally Championship for Manufacturers, Toyota Gazoo Racing WRT held a twenty-one-point lead over defending manufacturers' champions Hyundai Shell Mobis WRT, following by M-Sport Ford WRT.

In the World Rally Championship-2 standings, Mads Østberg and Torstein Eriksen held a nine-point lead ahead of Nikolay Gryazin and Yaroslav Fedorov in the drivers' and co-drivers' standings respectively, with Pontus Tidemand and Patrick Barth in third. In the manufacturer' championship, Hyundai Motorsport N led M-Sport Ford WRT by twenty-two points. PH-Sport sit in third, a slender two points behind.

In the World Rally Championship-3 standings, the crew of Eric Camilli and François-Xavier Buresi, Jari Huttunen and Mikko Lukka, and Marco Bulacia Wilkinson and Giovanni Bernacchini all held twenty-five points in the standings.

In the junior championship, Tom Kristensson and Joakim Sjöberg led Mārtiņš Sesks and Renars Francis by nine points. Ken Torn and Kauri Pannas were third, a slender four points further back. In the Nations' championships, Sweden held a seven-point lead over Latvia, with Estonia in third.

=== Schedule changes and event inclusion ===
Following the impact of the COVID-19 pandemic on the championship, a number of events were cancelled or postponed indefinitely for health and safety grounds, with Rally Mexico abridged to give time for crews to head home due to lockdowns being implemented across the world. It was then announced on 2 July 2020 that the season would return with an updated calendar, with Rally Estonia hosting the resuming round between 4 and 6 September. The country became the thirty-third nation to stage a championship round in the WRC.

=== Entry list ===
The following crews entered into the rally. The event was open to crews competing in the World Rally Championship, its support categories, the World Rally Championship-2, World Rally Championship-3, and Junior World Rally Championship and privateer entries that were not registered to score points in any championship. Sixty entries were received, with thirteen crews entered in World Rally Cars, six Group R5 cars entered in the World Rally Championship-2, twenty-two in the World Rally Championship-3. A further twelve crews were entered in the Junior World Rally Championship in Ford Fiesta R2s.

No.	Driver	Co-Driver	Entrant	Car	Tyre
World Rally Championship entries
3	(Finland) Teemu Suninen	(Finland) Jarmo Lehtinen	(United Kingdom) M-Sport Ford WRT	Ford Fiesta WRC	MI
4	(Finland) Esapekka Lappi	(Finland) Janne Ferm	(United Kingdom) M-Sport Ford WRT	Ford Fiesta WRC	MI
7	(France) Pierre-Louis Loubet	(France) Vincent Landais	(France) Hyundai 2C Competition	Hyundai i20 Coupe WRC	MI
8	(Estonia) Ott Tänak	(Estonia) Martin Järveoja	(South Korea) Hyundai Shell Mobis WRT	Hyundai i20 Coupe WRC	MI
11	(Belgium) Thierry Neuville	(Belgium) Nicolas Gilsoul	(South Korea) Hyundai Shell Mobis WRT	Hyundai i20 Coupe WRC	MI
17	(France) Sébastien Ogier	(France) Julien Ingrassia	(Japan) Toyota Gazoo Racing WRT	Toyota Yaris WRC	MI
18	(Japan) Takamoto Katsuta	(United Kingdom) Daniel Barritt	(Japan) Toyota Gazoo Racing WRT	Toyota Yaris WRC	MI
33	(United Kingdom) Elfyn Evans	(United Kingdom) Scott Martin	(Japan) Toyota Gazoo Racing WRT	Toyota Yaris WRC	MI
42	(Republic of Ireland) Craig Breen	(Republic of Ireland) Paul Nagle	(South Korea) Hyundai Shell Mobis WRT	Hyundai i20 Coupe WRC	MI
44	(United Kingdom) Gus Greensmith	(United Kingdom) Elliott Edmondson	(United Kingdom) M-Sport Ford WRT	Ford Fiesta WRC	MI
64	(Estonia) Georg Gross	(Estonia) Raigo Mõlder	(Estonia) OT Racing	Ford Fiesta WRC	MI
65	(Finland) Kimmo Kurkela	(Finland) Reeta Hämäläinen	(Finland) JanPro	Ford Fiesta WRC	MI
69	(Finland) Kalle Rovanperä	(Finland) Jonne Halttunen	(Japan) Toyota Gazoo Racing WRT	Toyota Yaris WRC	MI
World Rally Championship-2 entries
21	(Norway) Mads Østberg	(Norway) Torstein Eriksen	(France) PH-Sport (Note: Entry supported by Citroën World Rally Team.)	Citroën C3 R5	MI
22	(Russia) Nikolay Gryazin	(Russia) Konstantin Aleksandrov	(South Korea) Hyundai Motorsport N (Note: Entry prepared by RedGrey Rally Team.)	Hyundai NG i20 R5	P
23	(Sweden) Pontus Tidemand	(Sweden) Patrik Barth	(Germany) Toksport WRT	Škoda Fabia R5 Evo	P
24	(Norway) Ole Christian Veiby	(Sweden) Jonas Andersson	(South Korea) Hyundai Motorsport N	Hyundai NG i20 R5	P
25	(France) Adrien Fourmaux	(Belgium) Renaud Jamoul	(United Kingdom) M-Sport Ford WRT	Ford Fiesta R5 Mk. II	MI
26	(Norway) Eyvind Brynildsen	(Austria) Ilka Minor	(Germany) Toksport WRT	Škoda Fabia R5 Evo	P
World Rally Championship-3 entries
27	(Finland) Jari Huttunen	(Finland) Mikko Lukka	(Finland) Jari Huttunen (Note: Entry operated by Hyundai Poland Racing.)	Hyundai NG i20 R5	MI
28	(Bolivia) Marco Bulacia Wilkinson	(Argentina) Marcelo Der Ohannesian	(Bolivia) Marco Bulacia Wilkinson (Note: Entry operated by VIALCO Racing.)	Citroën C3 R5	P
29	(France) Nicolas Ciamin	(France) Yannick Roche	(France) Nicolas Ciamin (Note: Entry operated by DG Sport.)	Citroën C3 R5	MI
30	(Chile) Emilio Fernández	(Argentina) Ruben Garcia	(Chile) Emilio Fernández (Note: Entry operated by Toksport WRT.)	Škoda Fabia R5 Evo	MI
31	(France) Yohan Rossel	(France) Benoit Fulcrand	(France) PH-Sport	Citroën C3 R5	MI
32	(Finland) Eerik Pietarinen	(Finland) Antti Linnaketo	(Finland) Eerik Pietarinen (Note: Entry operated by TGS Worldwide.)	Škoda Fabia R5	P
34	(Poland) Kajetan Kajetanowicz	(Poland) Maciej Szczepaniak	(Poland) Kajetan Kajetanowicz (Note: Entry operated by Lotos Dynamic World Rally Team.)	Škoda Fabia R5 Evo	P
35	(Sweden) Oliver Solberg	(Republic of Ireland) Aaron Johnston	(Sweden) Oliver Solberg (Note: Entry operated by Solberg World Rally.)	Volkswagen Polo GTI R5	P
36	(Luxembourg) Grégoire Munster	(Belgium) Louis Louka	(Luxembourg) Grégoire Munster	Hyundai i20 R5	P
37	(Estonia) Raul Jeets	(Estonia) Andrus Toom	(Estonia) Raul Jeets	Škoda Fabia R5 Evo	MI
38	(Estonia) Roland Poom	(Estonia) Erik Lepikson	(Estonia) Roland Poom	Ford Fiesta R5 Mk. II	P
39	(Estonia) Karl Kruuda	(Australia) Dale Moscatt	(Estonia) Karl Kruuda	Volkswagen Polo GTI R5	P
40	(Estonia) Rainer Aus	(Estonia) Simo Koskinen	(Estonia) Rainer Aus	Škoda Fabia R5	P
41	(Estonia) Egon Kaur	(Estonia) Silver Simm	(Estonia) Kaur Motorsport	Škoda Fabia R5 Evo	P
43	(Estonia) Priit Koik	(Estonia) Alari-Uku Heldna	(Estonia) Priit Koik	Ford Fiesta R5	P
45	(Estonia) Georg Linnamäe	(Ukraine) Volodymyr Korsia	(Estonia) Georg Linnamäe	Volkswagen Polo GTI R5	P
46	(Estonia) Gustav Kruuda	(Estonia) Ken Järveoja	(Estonia) Gustav Kruuda	Volkswagen Polo GTI R5	P
47	(Spain) Jan Solans	(Spain) Mauro Barreiro	(Spain) Jan Solans	Ford Fiesta R5 Mk. II	P
48	(Russia) Radik Shaymiev	(Russia) Alexey Arnautov	(Russia) Radik Shaymiev	Ford Fiesta R5 Mk. II	P
49	(Poland) Jarosław Koltun	(Poland) Ireneusz Pleskot	(Poland) Jarosław Koltun	Ford Fiesta R5 Mk. II	P
50	(United States) Sean Johnston	(United States) Alex Kihurani	(France) Saintéloc Junior Team	Citroën C3 R5	P
51	(Saudi Arabia) Rakan Al-Rashed	(Portugal) Hugo Magalhães	(Saudi Arabia) Rakan Al-Rashed	Volkswagen Polo GTI R5	P
Junior World Rally Championship entries
52	(Sweden) Tom Kristensson	(Sweden) Joakim Sjöberg	(Sweden) Tom Kristensson Motorsport	Ford Fiesta R2	P
53	(Latvia) Mārtiņš Sesks	(Latvia) Renars Francis	(Latvia) LMT Autosporta Akadēmija	Ford Fiesta R2	P
54	(Estonia) Ken Torn	(Estonia) Kauri Pannas	(Estonia) Estonian Autosport Junior Team	Ford Fiesta R2	P
55	(Finland) Sami Pajari	(Finland) Marko Salminen	(Finland) Team Flying Finn	Ford Fiesta R2	P
56	(Romania) Raul Baidu	(Romania) Gabriel Lazar	(Romania) Raul Baidu	Ford Fiesta R2	P
57	(Paraguay) Fabrizio Zaldívar	(Argentina) Fernando Mussano	(Paraguay) Fabrizio Zaldívar	Ford Fiesta R2	P
58	(United Kingdom) Ruairi Bell	(United Kingdom) Matthew Edwards	(United Kingdom) Ruairi Bell	Ford Fiesta R2	P
59	(Sweden) Pontus Lönnström	(Sweden) Stefan Gustavsson	(Sweden) Pontus Lönnström	Ford Fiesta R2	P
60	(Italy) Marco Pollara	(Italy) Maurizio Messina	(Italy) Marco Pollara	Ford Fiesta R2	P
61	(Italy) Fabio Andolfi	(Italy) Stefano Savoia	(Italy) Fabio Andolfi	Ford Fiesta R2	P
62	(Italy) Enrico Oldrati	(Italy) Elia De Guio	(Italy) Enrico Oldrati	Ford Fiesta R2	P
63	(Estonia) Robert Virves	(Estonia) Sander Pruul	(Estonia) Estonian Autosport Junior Team	Ford Fiesta R2	P

=== Route ===
The rally features a short format schedule, which lasts only three days. This leads to the change of road order rules—Saturday's first loop would start as championship order, while the second loop would revert to the standard reversed order, which usually comes into effect on the second leg.

==== Itinerary ====
All dates and times are EEST (UTC+3).

Date	Time	No.	Stage name	Distance
4 September	09:01	—	Abissaare [Shakedown]	5.51 km
Leg 1 — 1.28 km
4 September	19:08	SS1	Tartu	1.28 km
Leg 2 — 146.40 km
5 September	07:40	SS2	Prangli 1	20.23 km
5 September	08:21	SS3	Kanepi 1	16.89 km
5 September	09:08	SS4	Otepää 1	9.60 km
5 September	10:00	SS5	Mäeküla 1	14.76 km
5 September	11:19	SS6	Elva 1	11.72 km
5 September	14:37	SS7	Prangli 2	20.23 km
5 September	15:18	SS8	Kanepi 2	16.89 km
5 September	16:08	SS9	Otepää 2	9.60 km
5 September	17:00	SS10	Mäeküla 2	14.76 km
5 September	18:19	SS11	Elva 2	11.72 km
Leg 3 — 84.96 km
6 September	07:35	SS12	Arula 1	6.97 km
6 September	08:09	SS13	Kaagvere 1	15.46 km
6 September	09:08	SS14	Kambja 1	20.05 km
6 September	10:49	SS15	Arula 2	6.97 km
6 September	11:28	SS16	Kaagvere 2	15.46 km
6 September	13:18	SS17	Kambja 2 [Power Stage]	20.05 km

== Report ==
=== World Rally Cars ===
Local heroes Ott Tänak and Martin Järveoja led almost the entire rally to win their home event. Kalle Rovanperä and Jonne Halttunen received a one-minute time penalty for illegally removing the radiator blanking plate. Thierry Neuville and Nicolas Gilsoul retired from Saturday afternoon after they damaged their rear-right suspension. The Belgian crew's rally was further compromised as they suffered an electrical issue in the penultimate Power Stage. Takamoto Katsuta and Daniel Barritt crashed out on Sunday, while Pierre-Louis Loubet and Vincent Landais retired from their top-tier debut when they broke their steering.

==== Classification ====
Position		No.	Driver	Co-driver	Entrant	Car	Time	Difference	Points	
Event	Class	No.	Driver	Co-driver	Entrant	Car	Time	Difference	Event	Stage
1	1	8	Ott Tänak	Martin Järveoja	Hyundai Shell Mobis WRT	Hyundai i20 Coupe WRC	1:59:53.6	0.0	25	3
2	2	42	Craig Breen	Paul Nagle	Hyundai Shell Mobis WRT	Hyundai i20 Coupe WRC	2:00:15.8	+22.2	18	1
3	3	17	Sébastien Ogier	Julien Ingrassia	Toyota Gazoo Racing WRT	Toyota Yaris WRC	2:00:20.5	+26.9	15	2
4	4	33	Elfyn Evans	Scott Martin	Toyota Gazoo Racing WRT	Toyota Yaris WRC	2:00:35.5	+41.9	12	4
5	5	69	Kalle Rovanperä	Jonne Halttunen	Toyota Gazoo Racing WRT	Toyota Yaris WRC	2:01:12.3	+1:18.7	10	5
6	6	3	Teemu Suninen	Jarmo Lehtinen	M-Sport Ford WRT	Ford Fiesta WRC	2:02:33.2	+2:39.6	8	0
7	7	4	Esapekka Lappi	Janne Ferm	M-Sport Ford WRT	Ford Fiesta WRC	2:02:45.6	+2:52.0	6	0
8	8	44	Gus Greensmith	Elliott Edmondson	M-Sport Ford WRT	Ford Fiesta WRC	2:04:47.4	+4:53.8	4	0
25	9	65	Kimmo Kurkela	Reeta Hämäläinen	JanPro	Ford Fiesta WRC	2:15:35.7	+15:42.1	0	0
Retired SS17		11	Thierry Neuville	Nicolas Gilsoul	Hyundai Shell Mobis WRT	Hyundai i20 Coupe WRC	Electrical		0	0
Retired SS13		7	Pierre-Louis Loubet	Vincent Landais	Hyundai 2C Competition	Hyundai i20 Coupe WRC	Steering		0	0
Retired SS13		18	Takamoto Katsuta	Daniel Barritt	Toyota Gazoo Racing WRT	Toyota Yaris WRC	Rolled		0	0
Retired SS2		64	Georg Gross	Raigo Mõlder	OT Racing	Ford Fiesta WRC	Accident		0	0

==== Special stages ====
Date	No.	Stage name	Distance	Winners	Car	Time	Class leaders
4 September	—	Abissaare [Shakedown]	5.51 km	Tänak / Järveoja	Hyundai i20 Coupe WRC	2:56.8	—N/a
4 September	SS1	Tartu	1.28 km	Lappi / Ferm; Ogier / Ingrassia	Ford Fiesta WRC; Toyota Yaris WRC	1:17.0	Lappi / Ferm; Ogier / Ingrassia
5 September	SS2	Prangli 1	20.23 km	Rovanperä / Halttunen	Toyota Yaris WRC	9:52.1	Rovanperä / Halttunen
5 September	SS3	Kanepi 1	16.89 km	Tänak / Järveoja	Hyundai i20 Coupe WRC	8:16.6	Tänak / Järveoja
5 September	SS4	Otepää 1	9.60 km	Tänak / Järveoja	Hyundai i20 Coupe WRC	5:04.5	Tänak / Järveoja
5 September	SS5	Mäeküla 1	14.76 km	Ogier / Ingrassia	Toyota Yaris WRC	7:46.2	Tänak / Järveoja
5 September	SS6	Elva 1	11.72 km	Neuville / Gilsoul	Hyundai i20 Coupe WRC	6:05.1	Tänak / Järveoja
5 September	SS7	Prangli 2	20.23 km	Ogier / Ingrassia	Toyota Yaris WRC	9:45.3	Tänak / Järveoja
5 September	SS8	Kanepi 2	16.89 km	Tänak / Järveoja	Hyundai i20 Coupe WRC	8:10.6	Tänak / Järveoja
5 September	SS9	Otepää 2	9.60 km	Breen / Nagle	Hyundai i20 Coupe WRC	5:00.4	Tänak / Järveoja
5 September	SS10	Mäeküla 2	14.76 km	Breen / Nagle	Hyundai i20 Coupe WRC	7:40.1	Tänak / Järveoja
5 September	SS11	Elva 2	11.72 km	Rovanperä / Halttunen	Toyota Yaris WRC	5:58.0	Tänak / Järveoja
6 September	SS12	Arula 1	6.97 km	Evans / Martin	Toyota Yaris WRC	3:15.3	Tänak / Järveoja
6 September	SS13	Kaagvere 1	15.46 km	Rovanperä / Halttunen	Toyota Yaris WRC	8:42.5	Tänak / Järveoja
6 September	SS14	Kambja 1	20.05 km	Ogier / Ingrassia	Toyota Yaris WRC	10:26.9	Tänak / Järveoja
6 September	SS15	Arula 2	6.97 km	Ogier / Ingrassia	Toyota Yaris WRC	3:14.7	Tänak / Järveoja
6 September	SS16	Kaagvere 2	15.46 km	Rovanperä / Halttunen	Toyota Yaris WRC	8:34.1	Tänak / Järveoja
6 September	SS17	Kambja 2 [Power Stage]	20.05 km	Rovanperä / Halttunen	Toyota Yaris WRC	10:12.4	Tänak / Järveoja

==== Championship standings ====
Pos.	Drivers' championships			Co-drivers' championships			Manufacturers' championships		
Pos.	Move	Driver	Points	Move	Co-driver	Points	Move	Manufacturer	Points
1		Sébastien Ogier	79		Julien Ingrassia	79		Toyota Gazoo Racing WRT	137
2		Elfyn Evans	70		Scott Martin	70		Hyundai Shell Mobis WRT	132
3	2	Ott Tänak	66	2	Martin Järveoja	66		M-Sport Ford WRT	83
4		Kalle Rovanperä	55		Jonne Halttunen	55			
5	2	Thierry Neuville	42	2	Nicolas Gilsoul	42			

=== World Rally Championship-2 ===
Mads Østberg and Torstein Eriksen dominated the class after a puncture. Early leaders Ole Christian Veiby and Jonas Andersson retired from Saturday when they hit a radiator issue. Things went from bad to worse when they rolled their Hyundai in the final stage after the restart. Teammate Nikolay Gryazin and Konstantin Aleksandrov could've finished second, but a puncture dropped them three minutes and tumbled to fifth.

==== Classification ====
Position		No.	Driver	Co-driver	Entrant	Car	Time	Difference	Points	
Event	Class	No.	Driver	Co-driver	Entrant	Car	Time	Difference	Class	Event
10	1	21	Mads Østberg	Torstein Eriksen	PH-Sport	Citroën C3 R5	2:08:10.9	0.0	25	1
13	2	25	Adrien Fourmaux	Renaud Jamoul	M-Sport Ford WRT	Ford Fiesta R5 Mk. II	2:09:39.3	+1:28.4	18	0
15	3	23	Pontus Tidemand	Patrick Barth	Toksport WRT	Škoda Fabia R5 Evo	2:11:01.0	+2:50.1	15	0
16	4	26	Eyvind Brynildsen	Ilka Minor	Toksport WRT	Škoda Fabia R5 Evo	2:11:03.1	+2:52.2	12	0
19	5	22	Nikolay Gryazin	Konstantin Aleksandrov	Hyundai Motorsport N	Hyundai NG i20 R5	1:20:03.7	+4:10.6	8	0
Retired SS16		24	Ole Christian Veiby	Jonas Andersson	Hyundai Motorsport N	Hyundai NG i20 R5	Rolled		0	0

==== Special stages ====
Date	No.	Stage name	Distance	Winners	Car	Time	Class leaders
4 September	—	Abissaare [Shakedown]	5.51 km	Østberg / Eriksen	Citroën C3 R5	3:09.4	—N/a
4 September	SS1	Tartu	1.28 km	Østberg / Eriksen	Citroën C3 R5	1:18.2	Østberg / Eriksen
5 September	SS2	Prangli 1	20.23 km	Veiby / Andersson	Hyundai NG i20 R5	10:31.8	Veiby / Andersson
5 September	SS3	Kanepi 1	16.89 km	Østberg / Eriksen	Citroën C3 R5	8:55.1	Østberg / Eriksen
5 September	SS4	Otepää 1	9.60 km	Gryazin / Aleksandrov	Hyundai NG i20 R5	5:29.8	Fourmaux / Jamoul
5 September	SS5	Mäeküla 1	14.76 km	Østberg / Eriksen	Citroën C3 R5	8:16.2	Fourmaux / Jamoul
5 September	SS6	Elva 1	11.72 km	Østberg / Eriksen	Citroën C3 R5	6:28.7	Østberg / Eriksen
5 September	SS7	Prangli 2	20.23 km	Østberg / Eriksen	Citroën C3 R5	10:27.3	Østberg / Eriksen
5 September	SS8	Kanepi 2	16.89 km	Østberg / Eriksen	Citroën C3 R5	8:46.4	Østberg / Eriksen
5 September	SS9	Otepää 2	9.60 km	Østberg / Eriksen	Citroën C3 R5	5:21.1	Østberg / Eriksen
5 September	SS10	Mäeküla 2	14.76 km	Østberg / Eriksen	Citroën C3 R5	8:13.2	Østberg / Eriksen
5 September	SS11	Elva 2	11.72 km	Østberg / Eriksen	Citroën C3 R5	6:22.2	Østberg / Eriksen
6 September	SS12	Arula 1	6.97 km	Østberg / Eriksen	Citroën C3 R5	3:31.1	Østberg / Eriksen
6 September	SS13	Kaagvere 1	15.46 km	Østberg / Eriksen	Citroën C3 R5	9:13.5	Østberg / Eriksen
6 September	SS14	Kambja 1	20.05 km	Østberg / Eriksen	Citroën C3 R5	11:10.4	Østberg / Eriksen
6 September	SS15	Arula 2	6.97 km	Østberg / Eriksen	Citroën C3 R5	3:28.9	Østberg / Eriksen
6 September	SS16	Kaagvere 2	15.46 km	Østberg / Eriksen	Citroën C3 R5	9:09.3	Østberg / Eriksen
6 September	SS17	Kambja 2	20.05 km	Østberg / Eriksen	Citroën C3 R5	11:02.9	Østberg / Eriksen

==== Championship standings ====
Pos.	Drivers' championships			Co-drivers' championships			Manufacturers' championships		
Pos.	Move	Driver	Points	Move	Co-driver	Points	Move	Manufacturer	Points
1		Mads Østberg	75		Torstein Eriksen	75		Hyundai Motorsport N	84
2	1	Pontus Tidemand	55	1	Patrick Barth	55	1	PH-Sport	75
3	1	Nikolay Gryazin	51	2	Renaud Jamoul	48	1	M-Sport Ford WRT	70
4	1	Adrien Fourmaux	48	2	Yaroslav Fedorov	41		Toksport WRT	67
5	1	Ole Christian Veiby	33	1	Jonas Andersson	33			

=== World Rally Championship-3 ===
Oliver Solberg and Aaron Johnston overcame two punctures to lead the class on Saturday, and easily won the class. Major retirements were Kajetan Kajetanowicz and Maciej Szczepaniak, Gustav Kruuda and Ken Järveoja, and Raul Jeets and Andrus Toom. All three crews were forced to retire as they rolled their cars.

==== Classification ====
Position		No.	Driver	Co-driver	Entrant	Car	Time	Difference	Points	
Event	Class	No.	Driver	Co-driver	Entrant	Car	Time	Difference	Class	Event
9	1	35	Oliver Solberg	Aaron Johnston	Oliver Solberg	Volkswagen Polo GTI R5	2:07:32.2	0.0	25	2
11	2	27	Jari Huttunen	Mikko Lukka	Jari Huttunen	Hyundai NG i20 R5	2:08:31.2	+59.0	18	0
12	3	41	Egon Kaur	Silver Simm	Kaur Motorsport	Škoda Fabia R5 Evo	2:09:20.0	+1:47.8	15	0
14	4	28	Marco Bulacia Wilkinson	Marcelo Der Ohannesian	Marco Bulacia Wilkinson	Citroën C3 R5	2:10:08.8	+2:36.6	12	0
17	5	39	Karl Kruuda	Dale Moscatt	Karl Kruuda	Volkswagen Polo GTI R5	2:11:37.1	+4:04.9	10	0
18	6	29	Nicolas Ciamin	Yannick Roche	Nicolas Ciamin	Citroën C3 R5	2:11:44.9	+4:12.7	8	0
20	7	40	Rainer Aus	Simo Koskinen	Rainer Aus	Škoda Fabia R5	2:12:16.7	+4:44.5	6	0
21	8	50	Sean Johnston	Alex Kihurani	Saintéloc Junior Team	Citroën C3 R5	2:12:24.8	+4:52.6	4	0
22	9	31	Yohan Rossel	Benoit Fulcrand	PH Sport	Citroën C3 R5	2:12:36.2	+5:04.0	2	0
23	10	43	Priit Koik	Alari-Uku Heldna	Priit Koik	Ford Fiesta R5	2:13:56.9	+6:24.7	1	0
24	11	36	Grégoire Munster	Louis Louka	Grégoire Munster	Hyundai i20 R5	2:14:15.9	+6:43.7	0	0
26	12	47	Jan Solans	Mauro Barreiro	Jan Solans	Ford Fiesta R5 Mk. II	2:16:03.1	+8:30.9	0	0
27	13	49	Jarosław Koltun	Ireneusz Pleskot	Jarosław Koltun	Ford Fiesta R5 Mk. II	2:21:05.7	+13:33.5	0	0
31	14	48	Radik Shaymiev	Alexey Arnautov	Radik Shaymiev	Ford Fiesta R5 Mk. II	2:24:09.0	+16:36.8	0	0
34	15	38	Roland Poom	Erik Lepikson	Roland Poom	Ford Fiesta R5 Mk. II	2:27:09.1	+19:36.9	0	0
39	16	32	Eerik Pietarinen	Antti Linnaketo	Eerik Pietarinen	Škoda Fabia R5	2:42:30.6	+34:58.4	0	0
42	17	45	Georg Linnamäe	Volodymyr Korsia	Georg Linnamäe	Volkswagen Polo GTI R5	2:59:51.8	+52:19.6	0	0
43	18	51	Rakan Al-Rashed	Hugo Magalhães	Rakan Al-Rashed	Volkswagen Polo GTI R5	3:44:14.8	+1:36:41.6	0	0
Retired SS17		34	Kajetan Kajetanowicz	Maciej Szczepaniak	Kajetan Kajetanowicz	Škoda Fabia R5 Evo	Rolled		0	0
Retired SS16		46	Gustav Kruuda	Ken Järveoja	Gustav Kruuda	Volkswagen Polo GTI R5	Rolled		0	0
Retired SS13		37	Raul Jeets	Andrus Toom	Raul Jeets	Škoda Fabia R5 Evo	Rolled		0	0
Retired SS3		30	Emilio Fernández	Ruben Garcia	Emilio Fernández	Škoda Fabia R5 Evo	Mechanical		0	0

==== Special stages ====
Date	No.	Stage name	Distance	Winners	Car	Time	Class leaders
4 September	—	Abissaare [Shakedown]	5.51 km	Huttunen / Lukka	Hyundai NG i20 R5	3:10.1	—N/a
4 September	SS1	Tartu	1.28 km	Huttunen / Lukka	Hyundai NG i20 R5	1:18.5	Huttunen / Lukka
5 September	SS2	Prangli 1	20.23 km	Kaur / Simm	Škoda Fabia R5 Evo	10:29.2	Kaur / Simm
5 September	SS3	Kanepi 1	16.89 km	Kajetanowicz / Szczepaniak	Škoda Fabia R5 Evo	8:51.9	Kaur / Simm
5 September	SS4	Otepää 1	9.60 km	Solberg / Johnston	Volkswagen Polo GTI R5	5:21.4	Solberg / Johnston
5 September	SS5	Mäeküla 1	14.76 km	Solberg / Johnston	Volkswagen Polo GTI R5	8:15.1	Solberg / Johnston
5 September	SS6	Elva 1	11.72 km	Solberg / Johnston	Volkswagen Polo GTI R5	6:26.8	Solberg / Johnston
5 September	SS7	Prangli 2	20.23 km	Solberg / Johnston	Volkswagen Polo GTI R5	10:27.0	Solberg / Johnston
5 September	SS8	Kanepi 2	16.89 km	Kaur / Simm	Škoda Fabia R5 Evo	8:47.3	Solberg / Johnston
5 September	SS9	Otepää 2	9.60 km	Solberg / Johnston	Volkswagen Polo GTI R5	5:19.3	Solberg / Johnston
5 September	SS10	Mäeküla 2	14.76 km	Solberg / Johnston	Volkswagen Polo GTI R5	8:17.4	Solberg / Johnston
5 September	SS11	Elva 2	11.72 km	Huttunen / Lukka	Hyundai NG i20 R5	6:23.5	Solberg / Johnston
6 September	SS12	Arula 1	6.97 km	Solberg / Johnston	Volkswagen Polo GTI R5	3:29.1	Solberg / Johnston
6 September	SS13	Kaagvere 1	15.46 km	Huttunen / Lukka	Hyundai NG i20 R5	9:07.3	Solberg / Johnston
6 September	SS14	Kambja 1	20.05 km	Solberg / Johnston	Volkswagen Polo GTI R5	11:04.5	Solberg / Johnston
6 September	SS15	Arula 2	6.97 km	Kajetanowicz / Szczepaniak	Škoda Fabia R5 Evo	3:27.7	Solberg / Johnston
6 September	SS16	Kaagvere 2	15.46 km	Huttunen / Lukka	Hyundai NG i20 R5	9:03.7	Solberg / Johnston
6 September	SS17	Kambja 2	20.05 km	Solberg / Johnston	Volkswagen Polo GTI R5	11:00.2	Solberg / Johnston

==== Championship standings ====
Pos.	Drivers' championships			Co-drivers' championships		
Pos.	Move	Driver	Points	Move	Co-driver	Points
1	1	Jari Huttunen	43	1	Mikko Lukka	43
2	1	Marco Bulacia Wilkinson	37	12	Aaron Johnston	35
3	11	Oliver Solberg	35	1	Yannick Roche	26
4		Nicolas Ciamin	26	1	Giovanni Bernacchini	25
5	4	Eric Camilli	25	4	François-Xavier Buresi	25

=== Junior World Rally Championship ===
Despite the fact that Robert Virves and Sander Pruul failed to win a stage, consistent pace helped the local crew to the junior class. However, the local crew suffered a puncture on Sunday, which handed the victory to the Latvian crew of Mārtiņš Sesks and Renars Francis.

==== Classification ====
Position		No.	Driver	Co-driver	Entrant	Car	Time	Difference	Points	
Event	Class	No.	Driver	Co-driver	Entrant	Car	Time	Difference	Class	Stage
28	1	53	Mārtiņš Sesks	Renars Francis	LMT Autosporta Akadēmija	Ford Fiesta R2	2:21:20.5	0.0	25	3
29	2	55	Sami Pajari	Marko Salminen	Team Flying Finn	Ford Fiesta R2	2:21:35.2	+14.7	18	8
30	3	63	Robert Virves	Sander Pruul	Estonian Autosport Junior Team	Ford Fiesta R2	2:21:58.3	+37.8	15	2
33	4	58	Ruairi Bell	Matthew Edwards	Ruairi Bell	Ford Fiesta R2	2:26:33.2	+5:12.7	12	0
35	5	60	Marco Pollara	Maurizio Messina	Marco Pollara	Ford Fiesta R2	2:28:24.4	+7:03.9	10	0
37	6	57	Fabrizio Zaldívar	Fernando Mussano	Fabrizio Zaldívar	Ford Fiesta R2	2:30:50.3	+9:29.8	8	0
38	7	62	Enrico Oldrati	Elia De Guio	Enrico Oldrati	Ford Fiesta R2	2:32:05.2	+10:44.7	6	0
44	8	56	Raul Baidu	Gabriel Lazar	Raul Baidu	Ford Fiesta R2	3:46:06.5	+1:24:46.0	4	0
Retired SS15		59	Pontus Lönnström	Stefan Gustavsson	Pontus Lönnström	Ford Fiesta R2	Accident		0	0
Retired SS13		54	Ken Torn	Kauri Pannas	Estonian Autosport Junior Team	Ford Fiesta R2	Mechanical		0	3
Retired SS4		61	Fabio Andolfi	Stefano Savoia	Fabio Andolfi	Ford Fiesta R2	Mechanical		0	0
Retired SS3		52	Tom Kristensson	Joakim Sjöberg	Tom Kristensson Motorsport	Ford Fiesta R2	Crank shaft		0	1

==== Special stages ====
Date	No.	Stage name	Distance	Winners	Car	Time	Class leaders
4 September	—	Abissaare [Shakedown]	5.51 km	Pajari / Salminen	Ford Fiesta R2	3:31.7	—N/a
4 September	SS1	Tartu	1.28 km	Pajari / Salminen	Ford Fiesta R2	1:24.3	Pajari / Salminen
5 September	SS2	Prangli 1	20.23 km	Kristensson / Sjöberg	Ford Fiesta R2	11:26.8	Kristensson / Sjöberg
5 September	SS3	Kanepi 1	16.89 km	Sesks / Francis	Ford Fiesta R2	9:48.6	Sesks / Francis
5 September	SS4	Otepää 1	9.60 km	Torn / Pannas	Ford Fiesta R2	5:52.9	Virves / Pruul
5 September	SS5	Mäeküla 1	14.76 km	Torn / Pannas	Ford Fiesta R2	9:09.0	Virves / Pruul
5 September	SS6	Elva 1	11.72 km	Torn / Pannas	Ford Fiesta R2	6:56.6	Virves / Pruul
5 September	SS7	Prangli 2	20.23 km	Sesks / Francis	Ford Fiesta R2	11:27.5	Virves / Pruul
5 September	SS8	Kanepi 2	16.89 km	Pajari / Salminen	Ford Fiesta R2	9:46.7	Virves / Pruul
5 September	SS9	Otepää 2	9.60 km	Pajari / Salminen	Ford Fiesta R2	5:55.3	Virves / Pruul
5 September	SS10	Mäeküla 2	14.76 km	Pajari / Salminen	Ford Fiesta R2	9:12.7	Virves / Pruul
5 September	SS11	Elva 2	11.72 km	Pajari / Salminen	Ford Fiesta R2	7:04.3	Virves / Pruul
6 September	SS12	Arula 1	6.97 km	Sesks / Francis	Ford Fiesta R2	3:52.5	Virves / Pruul
6 September	SS13	Kaagvere 1	15.46 km	Pajari / Salminen	Ford Fiesta R2	10:03.6	Virves / Pruul
6 September	SS14	Kambja 1	20.05 km	Pajari / Salminen	Ford Fiesta R2	12:20.6	Sesks / Francis
6 September	SS15	Arula 2	6.97 km	Pajari / Salminen	Ford Fiesta R2	3:51.2	Sesks / Francis
6 September	SS16	Kaagvere 2	15.46 km	Virves / Pruul	Ford Fiesta R2	9:59.3	Sesks / Francis
6 September	SS17	Kambja 2	20.05 km	Virves / Pruul	Ford Fiesta R2	12:10.4	Sesks / Francis

==== Championship standings ====
Pos.	Drivers' championships			Co-drivers' championships			Nations' championships		
Pos.	Move	Driver	Points	Move	Co-driver	Points	Move	Country	Points
1	1	Mārtiņš Sesks	47	1	Renars Francis	47	1	Latvia	43
2	2	Sami Pajari	39	2	Marko Salminen	39	2	Finland	30
3	2	Tom Kristensson	29	2	Joakim Sjöberg	29		Estonia	30
4	1	Ken Torn	18	1	Kauri Pannas	18	3	Sweden	25
5	2	Ruairi Bell	18		Sander Pruul	17	2	United Kingdom	18

== Notes ==
Previous rally: 2020 Rally Mexico; Several rallies called off	2020 FIA World Rally Championship	Next rally: 2020 Rally Turkey
Previous rally: 2019 Rally Estonia	2020 Rally Estonia	Next rally: 2021 Rally Estonia
