= 2020 Rally Turkey =

13th edition of Rally Turkey

2020 Rally Turkey: 13. Marmaris Rally Turkey
Round 5 of 7 in the 2020 World Rally Championship
← Previous event	Next event →
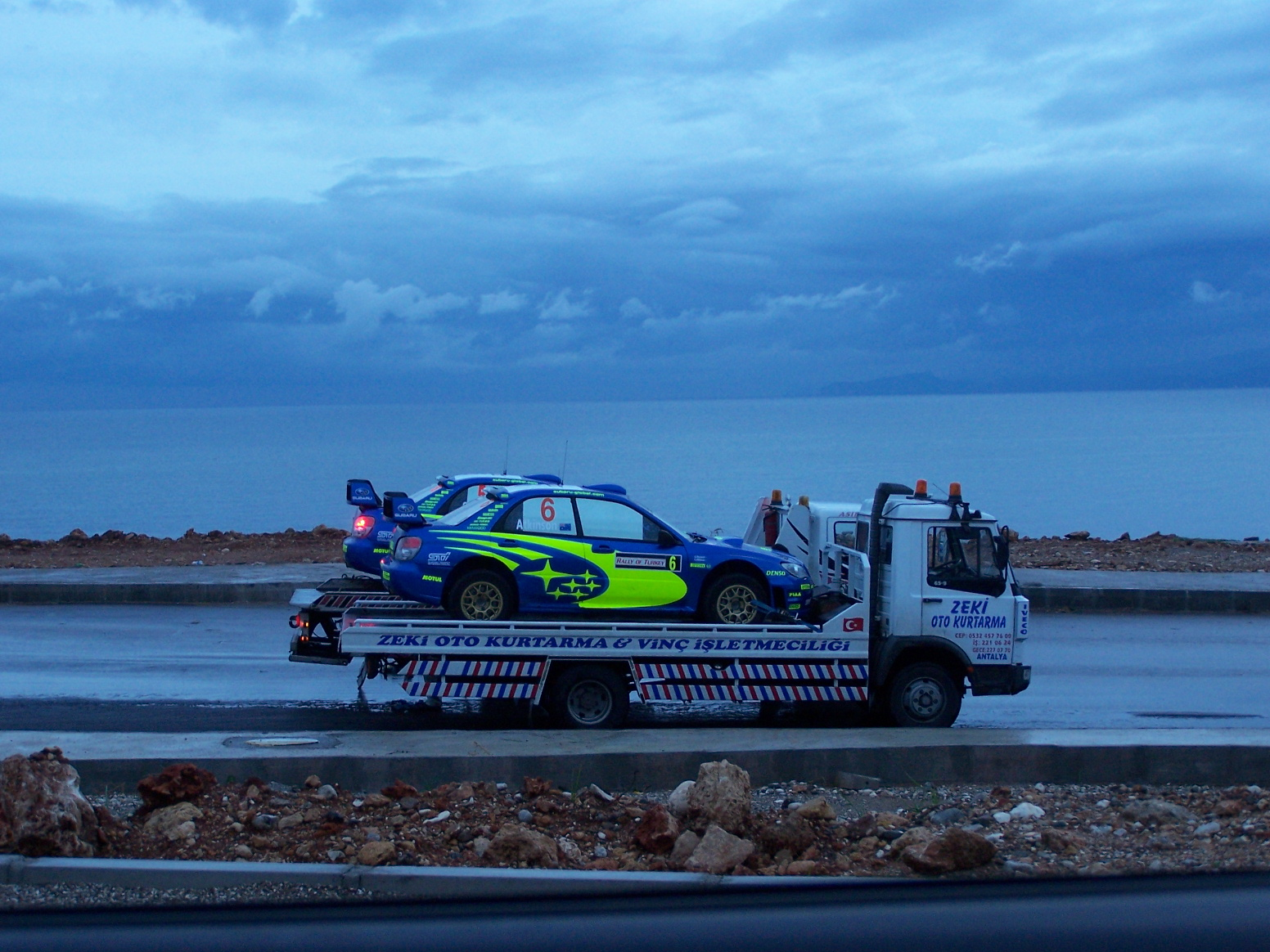
- Rally Turkey had moved forward by a week, which facilitated the opportunity for additional rounds as many rallies were cancelled due to the COVID-19 pandemic.
- Host country: Turkey
- Rally base: Marmaris, Muğla
- Dates run: 18 – 20 September 2020
- Start location: İçmeler, Muğla
- Finish location: Marmaris, Muğla
- Stages: 12 (223.00 km; 138.57 miles)
- Stage surface: Gravel
- Transport distance: 484.81 km (301.25 miles)
- Overall distance: 707.81 km (439.81 miles)

Statistics
- Crews registered: 26
- Crews: 24 at start, 18 at finish

Overall results
- Overall winner: (United Kingdom) Elfyn Evans (United Kingdom) Scott Martin (Japan) Toyota Gazoo Racing WRT; 2:43:02.7
- Power Stage winner: (Belgium) Thierry Neuville (Belgium) Nicolas Gilsoul (South Korea) Hyundai Shell Mobis WRT; 4:20.4

Support category results
- WRC-2 winner: (Sweden) Pontus Tidemand (Sweden) Patrik Barth (Germany) Toksport WRT; 2:56:02.4
- WRC-3 winner: (Poland) Kajetan Kajetanowicz (Poland) Maciej Szczepaniak; 2:55:38.2

The 2020 Rally Turkey (also known as Marmaris Rally Turkey 2020) was a motor racing event for rally cars that held between 18 and 20 September 2020. It marked the thirteenth running of Rally Turkey and was the fifth round of the 2020 World Rally Championship, World Rally Championship-2 and World Rally Championship-3. The 2020 event was based in Marmaris in Muğla Province, and was contested over twelve special stages with a total competitive distance of 223.00 km (138.57 mi).

Sébastien Ogier and Julien Ingrassia were the defending rally winners. Citroën World Rally Team, the team they drove for in 2019, were the reigning manufacturers' winners, but they did not defending their title after parent company Citroën withdrew from the sport. Gus Greensmith and Elliott Edmondson were the defending winners in the World Rally Championship-2 category, but they did not defend their titles as they were promoted to the sport's top tier by M-Sport Ford World Rally Team. (Note: The championship was known as the World Rally Championship-2 Pro in 2019.) In the World Rally Championship-3 category, Kajetan Kajetanowicz and Maciej Szczepaniak were the reigning rally winners. (Note: The championship was known as the World Rally Championship-2 in 2019.)

Elfyn Evans and Scott Martin were the overall winners of the rally, recording a second win of the season. Their team, Toyota Gazoo Racing WRT, were the manufacturers' winners. The Toksport WRT crew of Pontus Tidemand and Patrik Barth won the WRC-2 category. Kajetan Kajetanowicz and Maciej Szczepaniak successfully defended their tiles in the WRC-3 category.

== Background ==
=== Championship standings prior to the event ===
Six-time world champions Sébastien Ogier and Julien Ingrassia entered the round with a nine-point lead over Elfyn Evans and Scott Martin. Reigning world champions Ott Tänak and Martin Järveoja were third, a further four points behind. In the World Rally Championship for Manufacturers, Toyota Gazoo Racing WRT held a five-point lead over defending manufacturers' champions Hyundai Shell Mobis WRT, following by M-Sport Ford WRT.

In the World Rally Championship-2 standings, Mads Østberg and Torstein Eriksen held a twenty-point lead ahead of Pontus Tidemand and Patrick Barth in the drivers' and co-drivers' standings respectively, with Nikolay Gryazin and Renaud Jamoul in third. In the manufacturer' championship, Hyundai Motorsport N led PH-Sport by nine points. M-Sport Ford WRT sit in third, a slender five points behind.

In the World Rally Championship-3 standings, the crew of Jari Huttunen and Mikko Lukka led both drivers' and co-drivers' championships by six and eight points over Marco Bulacia Wilkinson and Aaron Johnston respectively. Oliver Solberg was third in the drivers' standings, while Yannick Roche held third in the co-drivers' standings.

=== Entry list ===
The following crews entered into the rally. The event was open to crews competing in the World Rally Championship, its support categories, the World Rally Championship-2, World Rally Championship-3 and privateer entries that were not registered to score points in any championship. Twenty-six entries were received, with ten crews entered in World Rally Cars, three Group R5 cars entered in the World Rally Championship-2 and twelve in the World Rally Championship-3.

No.	Driver	Co-Driver	Entrant	Car	Tyre
World Rally Championship entries
3	(Finland) Teemu Suninen	(Finland) Jarmo Lehtinen	(United Kingdom) M-Sport Ford WRT	Ford Fiesta WRC	MI
4	(Finland) Esapekka Lappi	(Finland) Janne Ferm	(United Kingdom) M-Sport Ford WRT	Ford Fiesta WRC	MI
7	(France) Pierre-Louis Loubet	(France) Vincent Landais	(France) Hyundai 2C Competition	Hyundai i20 Coupe WRC	MI
8	(Estonia) Ott Tänak	(Estonia) Martin Järveoja	(South Korea) Hyundai Shell Mobis WRT	Hyundai i20 Coupe WRC	MI
9	(France) Sébastien Loeb	(Monaco) Daniel Elena	(South Korea) Hyundai Shell Mobis WRT	Hyundai i20 Coupe WRC	MI
11	(Belgium) Thierry Neuville	(Belgium) Nicolas Gilsoul	(South Korea) Hyundai Shell Mobis WRT	Hyundai i20 Coupe WRC	MI
17	(France) Sébastien Ogier	(France) Julien Ingrassia	(Japan) Toyota Gazoo Racing WRT	Toyota Yaris WRC	MI
33	(United Kingdom) Elfyn Evans	(United Kingdom) Scott Martin	(Japan) Toyota Gazoo Racing WRT	Toyota Yaris WRC	MI
44	(United Kingdom) Gus Greensmith	(United Kingdom) Elliott Edmondson	(United Kingdom) M-Sport Ford WRT	Ford Fiesta WRC	MI
69	(Finland) Kalle Rovanperä	(Finland) Jonne Halttunen	(Japan) Toyota Gazoo Racing WRT	Toyota Yaris WRC	MI
World Rally Championship-2 entries
21	(Sweden) Pontus Tidemand	(Sweden) Patrik Barth	(Germany) Toksport WRT	Škoda Fabia R5 Evo	P
22	(France) Adrien Fourmaux	(Belgium) Renaud Jamoul	(United Kingdom) M-Sport Ford WRT	Ford Fiesta R5 Mk. II	MI
23	(Norway) Eyvind Brynildsen	(Austria) Ilka Minor	(Germany) Toksport WRT	Škoda Fabia R5 Evo	P
World Rally Championship-3 entries
24	(Bolivia) Marco Bulacia Wilkinson	(Argentina) Marcelo Der Ohannesian	(Bolivia) Marco Bulacia Wilkinson	Citroën C3 R5	P
25	(Chile) Emilio Fernández	(Argentina) Ruben Garcia	(Chile) Emilio Fernández	Škoda Fabia R5 Evo	MI
26	(Poland) Kajetan Kajetanowicz	(Poland) Maciej Szczepaniak	(Poland) Kajetan Kajetanowicz	Škoda Fabia R5 Evo	P
27	(Brazil) Paulo Nobre	(Brazil) Gabriel Morales	(Brazil) Paulo Nobre	Škoda Fabia R5	—N/a
28	(Turkey) Yağiz Avci	(Turkey) Onur Vatansever	(Turkey) Yağiz Avci	Citroën C3 R5	P
29	(Turkey) Burak Cukurova	(Turkey) Burak Akcay	(Turkey) Burak Cukurova	Škoda Fabia R5	P
30	(Turkey) Uğur Soylu	(Turkey) Mehmet Köleoğlu	(Turkey) Uğur Soylu	Škoda Fabia R5	P
31	(Chile) Alberto Heller	(Spain) Marc Martí	(Chile) Alberto Heller	Ford Fiesta R5 Mk. II	MI
32	(Spain) Jan Solans	(Spain) Mauro Barreiro	(Spain) Jan Solans	Ford Fiesta R5 Mk. II	P
34	(United States) Sean Johnston	(United States) Alex Kihurani	(France) Saintéloc Junior Team	Citroën C3 R5	P
35	(Portugal) Diogo Salvi	(Portugal) Hugo Magalhães	(Portugal) Diogo Salvi	Škoda Fabia R5	—N/a
36	(Italy) "Pedro" (Note: Pseudonym of Massimo Pedretti.)	(Italy) Emmanuele Baldaccini	(Italy) "Pedro"	Ford Fiesta R5 Mk. II	P

=== Route ===
==== Itinerary ====
All dates and times are TRT (UTC+3).

Date	Time	No.	Stage name	Distance
18 September	09:01	—	Asparan [Shakedown]	4.70 km
Leg 1 — 25.22 km
18 September	17:08	SS1	İçmeler	13.90 km
18 September	18:21	SS2	Gökçe	11.32 km
Leg 2 — 107.38 km
19 September	08:50	SS3	Yeşilbelde 1	31.79 km
19 September	10:08	SS4	Datça 1	8.75 km
19 September	11:06	SS5	Kızlan 1	13.15 km
19 September	14:50	SS6	Yeşilbelde 2	31.79 km
19 September	16:08	SS7	Datça 2	8.75 km
19 September	17:06	SS8	Kızlan 2	13.15 km
Leg 3 — 90.40 km
20 September	07:30	SS9	Çetibeli 1	38.15 km
20 September	09:08	SS10	Marmaris 1	7.05 km
20 September	11:20	SS11	Çetibeli 2	38.15 km
20 September	13:18	SS12	Marmaris 2 [Power Stage]	7.05 km

== Report ==
=== World Rally Cars ===
Sebastien Loeb and Daniel Elena held the lead going onto Saturday. At the age of forty-six, Loeb became the oldest driver to lead a WRC event. Ott Tänak and Martin Järveoja retired Friday when their Hyundai speared off the road because of a steering issue. Sebastien Ogier and Julien Ingrassia took over the lead on Saturday morning, but they dropped their lead to Thierry Neuville and Nicolas Gilsoul in the afternoon loop due to a puncture and hydraulics issue. Sunday's first pass through the Çetibeli stage saw tyre dramas, which saw five crews suffering punctures, including the crew of Neuville and Gilsoul, Loeb and Elena, Ogier and Ingrassia, Kalle Rovanperä and Jonne Halttunen, and Esapekka Lappi and Janne Ferm, with two more crews retired from the rally. Ogier and Ingrassia then retired from the rally when their engine was on fire. Eventually, the rally was won by Elfyn Evans and Scott Martin.

==== Classification ====
Position		No.	Driver	Co-driver	Entrant	Car	Time	Difference	Points	
Event	Class	No.	Driver	Co-driver	Entrant	Car	Time	Difference	Event	Stage
1	1	33	Elfyn Evans	Scott Martin	Toyota Gazoo Racing WRT	Toyota Yaris WRC	2:43:02.7	0.0	25	2
2	2	11	Thierry Neuville	Nicolas Gilsoul	Hyundai Shell Mobis WRT	Hyundai i20 Coupe WRC	2:43:37.9	+35.2	18	5
3	3	9	Sébastien Loeb	Daniel Elena	Hyundai Shell Mobis WRT	Hyundai i20 Coupe WRC	2:44:02.1	+59.4	15	1
4	4	69	Kalle Rovanperä	Jonne Halttunen	Toyota Gazoo Racing WRT	Toyota Yaris WRC	2:45:38.6	+2:35.9	12	3
5	5	44	Gus Greensmith	Elliott Edmondson	M-Sport Ford WRT	Ford Fiesta WRC	2:47:11.0	+4:08.3	10	0
6	6	4	Esapekka Lappi	Janne Ferm	M-Sport Ford WRT	Ford Fiesta WRC	2:48:38.9	+5:36.2	8	0
17	7	8	Ott Tänak	Martin Järveoja	Hyundai Shell Mobis WRT	Hyundai i20 Coupe WRC	3:56:46.0	+1:13:43.3	0	4
Retired SS11		17	Sebastien Ogier	Julien Ingrassia	Toyota Gazoo Racing WRT	Toyota Yaris WRC	Engine		0	0
Retired SS9		3	Teemu Suninen	Jarmo Lehtinen	M-Sport Ford WRT	Ford Fiesta WRC	Lost wheel		0	0
Retired SS9		7	Pierre-Louis Loubet	Vincent Landais	Hyundai 2C Competition	Hyundai i20 Coupe WRC	Mechanical		0	0

==== Special stages ====
Date	No.	Stage name	Distance	Winners	Car	Time	Class leaders
18 September	—	Asparan [Shakedown]	4.70 km	Neuville / Gilsoul	Hyundai i20 Coupe WRC	3:23.4	—N/a
18 September	SS1	İçmeler	13.90 km	Neuville / Gilsoul	Hyundai i20 Coupe WRC	10:13.1	Neuville / Gilsoul
18 September	SS2	Gökçe	11.32 km	Ogier / Ingrassia	Toyota Yaris WRC	8:34.0	Loeb / Elena
19 September	SS3	Yeşilbelde 1	31.79 km	Ogier / Ingrassia	Toyota Yaris WRC	24:54.2	Ogier / Ingrassia
19 September	SS4	Datça 1	8.75 km	Ogier / Ingrassia	Toyota Yaris WRC	6:53.9	Ogier / Ingrassia
19 September	SS5	Kızlan 1	13.15 km	Neuville / Gilsoul	Hyundai i20 Coupe WRC	7:10.7	Ogier / Ingrassia
19 September	SS6	Yeşilbelde 2	31.79 km	Neuville / Gilsoul	Hyundai i20 Coupe WRC	24:41.6	Neuville / Gilsoul
19 September	SS7	Datça 2	8.75 km	Neuville / Gilsoul	Hyundai i20 Coupe WRC	6:52.7	Neuville / Gilsoul
19 September	SS8	Kızlan 2	13.15 km	Loeb / Elena	Hyundai i20 Coupe WRC	7:09.4	Neuville / Gilsoul
20 September	SS9	Çetibeli 1	38.15 km	Evans / Martin	Toyota Yaris WRC	28:38.9	Evans / Martin
20 September	SS10	Marmaris 1	7.05 km	Neuville / Gilsoul	Hyundai i20 Coupe WRC	4:25.5	Evans / Martin
20 September	SS11	Çetibeli 2	38.15 km	Neuville / Gilsoul	Hyundai i20 Coupe WRC	27:46.0	Evans / Martin
20 September	SS12	Marmaris 2 [Power Stage]	7.05 km	Neuville / Gilsoul	Hyundai i20 Coupe WRC	4:20.4	Evans / Martin

==== Championship standings ====
Pos.	Drivers' championships			Co-drivers' championships			Manufacturers' championships		
Pos.	Move	Driver	Points	Move	Co-driver	Points	Move	Manufacturer	Points
1	1	Elfyn Evans	97	1	Scott Martin	97		Toyota Gazoo Racing WRT	174
2	1	Sébastien Ogier	79	1	Julien Ingrassia	79		Hyundai Shell Mobis WRT	165
3		Ott Tänak	70		Martin Järveoja	70		M-Sport Ford WRT	101
4		Kalle Rovanperä	70		Jonne Halttunen	70			
5		Thierry Neuville	65		Nicolas Gilsoul	65			

=== World Rally Championship-2 ===
Adrien Fourmaux and Renaud Jamoul claimed back-to-back stage wins to lead the class on Friday, but a rear-left puncture in Saturday afternoon cost them the lead. Pontus Tidemand and Patrick Barth took over the lead and won the class.

==== Classification ====
Position		No.	Driver	Co-driver	Entrant	Car	Time	Difference	Points	
Event	Class	No.	Driver	Co-driver	Entrant	Car	Time	Difference	Class	Event
8	1	21	Pontus Tidemand	Patrick Barth	Toksport WRT	Škoda Fabia R5 Evo	2:56:02.4	0.0	25	4
10	2	22	Adrien Fourmaux	Renaud Jamoul	M-Sport Ford WRT	Ford Fiesta R5 Mk. II	2:57:45.3	+1:42.9	18	1
18	3	23	Eyvind Brynildsen	Ilka Minor	Toksport WRT	Škoda Fabia R5 Evo	4:04:27.1	+1:08:24.7	15	0

==== Special stages ====
Date	No.	Stage name	Distance	Winners	Car	Time	Class leaders
18 September	—	Asparan [Shakedown]	4.70 km	Brynildsen / Minor	Škoda Fabia R5 Evo	3:47.1	—N/a
18 September	SS1	İçmeler	13.90 km	Fourmaux / Jamoul	Ford Fiesta R5 Mk. II	10:56.1	Fourmaux / Jamoul
18 September	SS2	Gökçe	11.32 km	Fourmaux / Jamoul	Ford Fiesta R5 Mk. II	9:01.0	Fourmaux / Jamoul
19 September	SS3	Yeşilbelde 1	31.79 km	Fourmaux / Jamoul	Ford Fiesta R5 Mk. II	26:36.2	Fourmaux / Jamoul
19 September	SS4	Datça 1	8.75 km	Tidemand / Barth	Škoda Fabia R5 Evo	7:14.9	Fourmaux / Jamoul
19 September	SS5	Kızlan 1	13.15 km	Tidemand / Barth	Škoda Fabia R5 Evo	7:37.1	Fourmaux / Jamoul
19 September	SS6	Yeşilbelde 2	31.79 km	Tidemand / Barth	Škoda Fabia R5 Evo	26:29.4	Tidemand / Barth
19 September	SS7	Datça 2	8.75 km	Tidemand / Barth	Škoda Fabia R5 Evo	7:14.1	Tidemand / Barth
19 September	SS8	Kızlan 2	13.15 km	Fourmaux / Jamoul	Ford Fiesta R5 Mk. II	7:41.8	Tidemand / Barth
20 September	SS9	Çetibeli 1	38.15 km	Fourmaux / Jamoul	Ford Fiesta R5 Mk. II	31:03.5	Tidemand / Barth
20 September	SS10	Marmaris 1	7.05 km	Tidemand / Barth	Škoda Fabia R5 Evo	4:43.8	Tidemand / Barth
20 September	SS11	Çetibeli 2	38.15 km	Fourmaux / Jamoul	Ford Fiesta R5 Mk. II	30:55.4	Tidemand / Barth
20 September	SS12	Marmaris 2	7.05 km	Tidemand / Barth	Škoda Fabia R5 Evo	4:38.1	Tidemand / Barth

==== Championship standings ====
Pos.	Drivers' championships			Co-drivers' championships			Manufacturers' championships		
Pos.	Move	Driver	Points	Move	Co-driver	Points	Move	Manufacturer	Points
1	1	Pontus Tidemand	80	1	Patrick Barth	80	3	Toksport WRT	107
2	1	Mads Østberg	75	1	Torstein Eriksen	75	1	M-Sport Ford WRT	88
3	1	Adrien Fourmaux	66		Renaud Jamoul	66	2	Hyundai Motorsport N	84
4	1	Nikolay Gryazin	51		Yaroslav Fedorov	41	2	PH-Sport	75
5		Ole Christian Veiby	33		Jonas Andersson	33			

=== World Rally Championship-3 ===
Marco Bulacia Wilkinson and Marcelo Der Ohannesian led the class through Friday. Sean Johnston and Alex Kihurani retired from the rally when their Citroën caught fire. Kajetan Kajetanowicz and Maciej Szczepaniak set some blistering times, opening a huge gap to comfortably win the rally.

==== Classification ====
Position		No.	Driver	Co-driver	Entrant	Car	Time	Difference	Points	
Event	Class	No.	Driver	Co-driver	Entrant	Car	Time	Difference	Class	Event
7	1	26	Kajetan Kajetanowicz	Maciej Szczepaniak	Kajetan Kajetanowicz	Škoda Fabia R5 Evo	2:55:38.2	0.0	25	6
9	2	24	Marco Bulacia Wilkinson	Marcelo Der Ohannesian	Marco Bulacia Wilkinson	Citroën C3 R5	2:57:49.1	+2:10.9	18	2
11	3	28	Yağiz Avci	Onur Vatansever	Yağiz Avci	Citroën C3 R5	3:02:53.8	+7:15.6	15	0
12	4	31	Alberto Heller	Marc Martí	Alberto Heller	Ford Fiesta R5 Mk. II	3:05:06.1	+9:27.9	12	0
13	5	29	Burak Cukurova	Burak Akcay	Burak Cukurova	Škoda Fabia R5	3:07:50.1	+12:11.9	10	0
14	6	32	Jan Solans	Mauro Barreiro	Jan Solans	Ford Fiesta R5 Mk. II	3:14:18.2	+18:40.0	8	0
15	7	25	Emilio Fernández	Ruben Garcia	Emilio Fernández	Škoda Fabia R5 Evo	3:16:55.2	+21:17.0	6	0
16	8	36	"Pedro"	Emmanuele Baldaccini	"Pedro"	Ford Fiesta R5 Mk. II	3:18:33.2	+22:55.0	4	0
Retired SS12		30	Uğur Soylu	Mehmet Köleoğlu	Uğur Soylu	Škoda Fabia R5	Mechanical		0	0
Retired SS2		34	Sean Johnston	Alex Kihurani	Saintéloc Junior Team	Citroën C3 R5	Fire		0	0
Did not start		27	Paulo Nobre	Gabriel Morales	Paulo Nobre	Škoda Fabia R5	Withdrawn		0	0
Did not start		35	Diogo Salvi	Hugo Magalhães	Diogo Salvi	Škoda Fabia R5	Withdrawn		0	0

==== Special stages ====
Date	No.	Stage name	Distance	Winners	Car	Time	Class leaders
18 September	—	Asparan [Shakedown]	4.70 km	Bulacia Wilkinson / Der Ohannesian	Citroën C3 R5	3:49.8	—N/a
18 September	SS1	İçmeler	13.90 km	Bulacia Wilkinson / Der Ohannesian	Citroën C3 R5	10:54.5	Bulacia Wilkinson / Der Ohannesian
18 September	SS2	Gökçe	11.32 km	Bulacia Wilkinson / Der Ohannesian	Citroën C3 R5	9:03.7	Bulacia Wilkinson / Der Ohannesian
19 September	SS3	Yeşilbelde 1	31.79 km	Kajetanowicz / Szczepaniak	Škoda Fabia R5 Evo	26:30.6	Kajetanowicz / Szczepaniak
19 September	SS4	Datça 1	8.75 km	Kajetanowicz / Szczepaniak	Škoda Fabia R5 Evo	7:09.7	Kajetanowicz / Szczepaniak
19 September	SS5	Kızlan 1	13.15 km	Bulacia Wilkinson / Der Ohannesian	Citroën C3 R5	7:39.6	Kajetanowicz / Szczepaniak
19 September	SS6	Yeşilbelde 2	31.79 km	Kajetanowicz / Szczepaniak	Škoda Fabia R5 Evo	26:16.1	Kajetanowicz / Szczepaniak
19 September	SS7	Datça 2	8.75 km	Kajetanowicz / Szczepaniak	Škoda Fabia R5 Evo	7:17.7	Kajetanowicz / Szczepaniak
19 September	SS8	Kızlan 2	13.15 km	Bulacia Wilkinson / Der Ohannesian	Citroën C3 R5	7:38.1	Kajetanowicz / Szczepaniak
20 September	SS9	Çetibeli 1	38.15 km	Solans / Barreiro	Ford Fiesta R5 Mk. II	31:04.4	Kajetanowicz / Szczepaniak
20 September	SS10	Marmaris 1	7.05 km	Kajetanowicz / Szczepaniak	Škoda Fabia R5 Evo	4:44.8	Kajetanowicz / Szczepaniak
20 September	SS11	Çetibeli 2	38.15 km	Kajetanowicz / Szczepaniak	Škoda Fabia R5 Evo	31:30.5	Kajetanowicz / Szczepaniak
20 September	SS12	Marmaris 2	7.05 km	Bulacia Wilkinson / Der Ohannesian	Citroën C3 R5	4:42.2	Kajetanowicz / Szczepaniak

==== Championship standings ====
Pos.	Drivers' championships			Co-drivers' championships		
Pos.	Move	Driver	Points	Move	Co-driver	Points
1	1	Marco Bulacia Wilkinson	55		Mikko Lukka	43
2	1	Jari Huttunen	43	11	Maciek Szczepaniak	37
3	11	Kajetan Kajetanowicz	37	1	Aaron Johnston	35
4	1	Oliver Solberg	35	9	Marcelo Der Ohannesian	30
5	1	Nicolas Ciamin	26	5	Marc Martí	27

== Notes ==
Previous rally: 2020 Rally Estonia	2020 FIA World Rally Championship	Next rally: 2020 Rally Italia Sardegna
Previous rally: 2019 Rally Turkey	2020 Rally Turkey	Next rally: TBD
