= 2020 Rally Italia Sardegna =

17th edition of Rally Italia Sardegna

2020 Rally Italia Sardegna: 17. Rally Italia Sardegna 2020
Round 6 of 7 in the 2020 World Rally Championship
← Previous event	Next event →
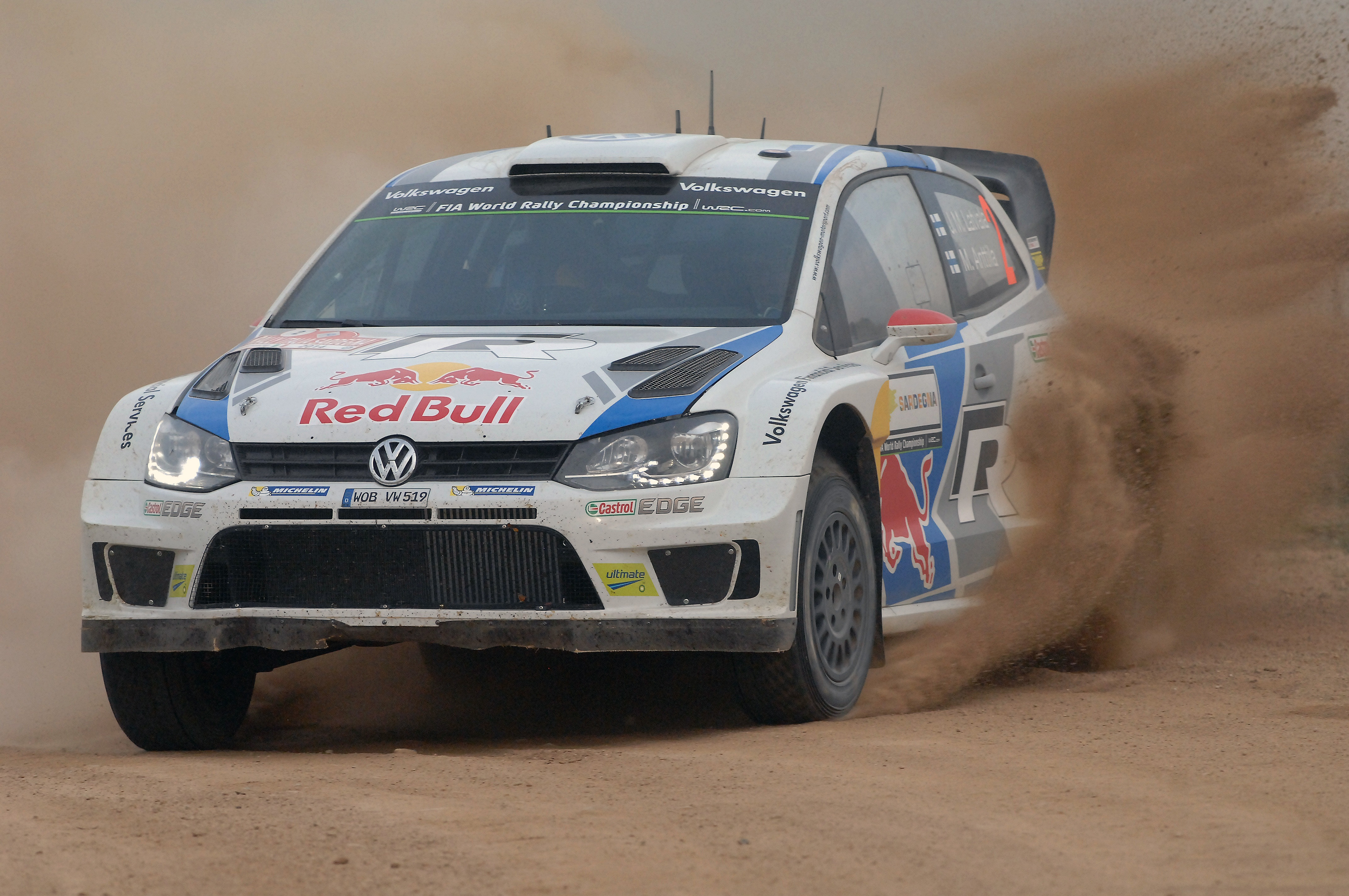
- Fast but narrow roads leave no room for error in Sardegna.
- Host country: Italy
- Rally base: Alghero, Sardinia
- Dates run: 8 – 11 October 2020
- Start location: Olbia, Sassari
- Finish location: Sassari, Sassari
- Stages: 16 (238.84 km; 148.41 miles)
- Stage surface: Gravel
- Transport distance: 960.31 km (596.71 miles)
- Overall distance: 1,199.15 km (745.12 miles)

Statistics
- Crews registered: 64
- Crews: 62 at start, 50 at finish

Overall results
- Overall winner: (Spain) Dani Sordo (Spain) Carlos del Barrio (South Korea) Hyundai Shell Mobis WRT; 2:41:37.5
- Power Stage winner: (Estonia) Ott Tänak (Estonia) Martin Järveoja (South Korea) Hyundai Shell Mobis WRT; 4:45.7

Support category results
- WRC-2 winner: (Sweden) Pontus Tidemand (Sweden) Patrik Barth (Germany) Toksport WRT; 2:51:58.4
- WRC-3 winner: (Finland) Jari Huttunen (Finland) Mikko Lukka; 2:50:19.2
- J-WRC winner: (Sweden) Tom Kristensson (Sweden) Joakim Sjöberg (Sweden) Tom Kristensson Motorsport; 3:07:49.1

The 2020 Rally Italia Sardegna (also known as the Rally Italia Sardegna 2020) was a motor racing event for rally cars that was scheduled to be held over four days between 4 and 7 June 2020, but had to be postponed due to the COVID-19 pandemic. The event was reset to hold between 8 and 11 October 2020 following the cancellation of 2020 Rallye Deutschland. It marked the seventeenth running of Rally Italia Sardegna and was the seventh round of the 2020 World Rally Championship, World Rally Championship-2 and World Rally Championship-3. It was also set to be the third round of the Junior World Rally Championship. The 2020 event was based in Alghero in Sardinia and consisted of sixteen special stages. The rally covered a total competitive distance of 238.84 km (148.41 mi).

Dani Sordo and Carlos del Barrio were the defending rally winners. Their team, Hyundai Shell Mobis WRT, were the manufacturers' winners. Kalle Rovanperä and Jonne Halttunen were the defending winners in the World Rally Championship-2 category, (Note: The championship was known as the World Rally Championship-2 Pro in 2019.) but they would not defend their titles as they were promoted to the higher class. In the World Rally Championship-3 category, Pierre-Louis Loubet and Vincent Landais were the reigning rally winners, (Note: The championship was known as the World Rally Championship-2 in 2019.) but they would not defend their titles neither as they were promoted to the sport's top category. Jan Solans and Mauro Barreiro were the defending winners in the Junior World Rally Championship.

Sordo and del Barrio successfully defended their titles, winning their third career victory. Their team, Hyundai Shell Mobis WRT, were the manufacturers' winners. Pontus Tidemand and Patrick Barth were the winners in the WRC-2 category. Jari Huttunen and Mikko Lukka were the winners in the WRC-3 category. Tom Kristensson and Henrik Appelskog won the junior class.

== Background ==
=== Championship standings prior to the event ===
Elfyn Evans and Scott Martin entered the round with an eighteen-point lead over six-time world champions Sébastien Ogier and Julien Ingrassia. Reigning world champions Ott Tänak and Martin Järveoja were third, a further nine points behind. In the World Rally Championship for Manufacturers, Toyota Gazoo Racing WRT held a nine-point lead over defending manufacturers' champions Hyundai Shell Mobis WRT, following by M-Sport Ford WRT.

In the World Rally Championship-2 standings, Pontus Tidemand and Patrick Barth held a five-point lead ahead of Mads Østberg and Torstein Eriksen in the drivers' and co-drivers' standings respectively, with Adrien Fourmaux and Renaud Jamoul in third. In the manufacturer' championship, Toksport WRT led M-Sport Ford WRT by nineteen points. Hyundai Motorsport N sat in third, a slender four points behind.

In the World Rally Championship-3 standings, Marco Bulacia Wilkinson led Jari Huttunen by twelve points in the drivers' standing, with Kajetan Kajetanowicz in third. The co-drivers' standing was led by Mikko Lukka. Maciek Szczepaniak and Aaron Johnston held second and third respectively.

In the junior championship, Mārtiņš Sesks and Renars Francis led Sami Pajari and Marko Salminen by eight points. Tom Kristensson and Joakim Sjöberg were third, eleven points further back. In the Nations' championships, Latvia held a thirteen-point lead over Finland, with Estonia in third.

=== Entry list ===
The following crews entered into the rally. The event was open to crews competing in the World Rally Championship, its support categories, the World Rally Championship-2, World Rally Championship-3, and Junior World Rally Championship and privateer entries that were not registered to score points in any championship. Sixty-four entries were received, with thirteen crews entered in World Rally Cars, six Group R5 cars entered in the World Rally Championship-2 and fifteen in the World Rally Championship-3. A further eight crews were entered in the Junior World Rally Championship in Ford Fiesta R2s.

No.	Driver	Co-Driver	Entrant	Car	Tyre
World Rally Championship entries
3	(Finland) Teemu Suninen	(Finland) Jarmo Lehtinen	(United Kingdom) M-Sport Ford WRT	Ford Fiesta WRC	MI
4	(Finland) Esapekka Lappi	(Finland) Janne Ferm	(United Kingdom) M-Sport Ford WRT	Ford Fiesta WRC	MI
6	(Spain) Dani Sordo	(Spain) Carlos del Barrio	(South Korea) Hyundai Shell Mobis WRT	Hyundai i20 Coupe WRC	MI
7	(France) Pierre-Louis Loubet	(France) Vincent Landais	(France) Hyundai 2C Competition	Hyundai i20 Coupe WRC	MI
8	(Estonia) Ott Tänak	(Estonia) Martin Järveoja	(South Korea) Hyundai Shell Mobis WRT	Hyundai i20 Coupe WRC	MI
11	(Belgium) Thierry Neuville	(Belgium) Nicolas Gilsoul	(South Korea) Hyundai Shell Mobis WRT	Hyundai i20 Coupe WRC	MI
17	(France) Sébastien Ogier	(France) Julien Ingrassia	(Japan) Toyota Gazoo Racing WRT	Toyota Yaris WRC	MI
18	(Japan) Takamoto Katsuta	(United Kingdom) Daniel Barritt	(Japan) Toyota Gazoo Racing WRT	Toyota Yaris WRC	MI
21	(Norway) Petter Solberg	(Norway) Andreas Mikkelsen	(France) Saintéloc Junior Team	Citroën C3 WRC	P
22	(Czech Republic) Martin Prokop	(Czech Republic) Zdeněk Jůrka	(Czech Republic) MP-Sports	Ford Fiesta RS WRC	MI
33	(United Kingdom) Elfyn Evans	(United Kingdom) Scott Martin	(Japan) Toyota Gazoo Racing WRT	Toyota Yaris WRC	MI
44	(United Kingdom) Gus Greensmith	(United Kingdom) Elliott Edmondson	(United Kingdom) M-Sport Ford WRT	Ford Fiesta WRC	MI
69	(Finland) Kalle Rovanperä	(Finland) Jonne Halttunen	(Japan) Toyota Gazoo Racing WRT	Toyota Yaris WRC	MI
World Rally Championship-2 entries
23	(Sweden) Pontus Tidemand	(Sweden) Patrik Barth	(Germany) Toksport WRT	Škoda Fabia R5 Evo	P
24	(Norway) Mads Østberg	(Norway) Torstein Eriksen	(France) PH-Sport	Citroën C3 R5	MI
25	(France) Adrien Fourmaux	(Belgium) Renaud Jamoul	(United Kingdom) M-Sport Ford WRT	Ford Fiesta R5 Mk. II	MI
26	(Russia) Nikolay Gryazin	(Russia) Konstantin Aleksandrov	(South Korea) Hyundai Motorsport N	Hyundai NG i20 R5	P
27	(Norway) Ole Christian Veiby	(Sweden) Jonas Andersson	(South Korea) Hyundai Motorsport N	Hyundai NG i20 R5	P
28	(Norway) Eyvind Brynildsen	(Austria) Ilka Minor	(Germany) Toksport WRT	Škoda Fabia R5 Evo	P
World Rally Championship-3 entries
29	(Bolivia) Marco Bulacia Wilkinson	(Argentina) Marcelo Der Ohannesian	(Bolivia) Marco Bulacia Wilkinson	Citroën C3 R5	P
30	(Finland) Jari Huttunen	(Finland) Mikko Lukka	(Finland) Jari Huttunen	Hyundai NG i20 R5	MI
31	(Poland) Kajetan Kajetanowicz	(Poland) Maciej Szczepaniak	(Poland) Kajetan Kajetanowicz	Škoda Fabia R5 Evo	P
32	(Sweden) Oliver Solberg	(Republic of Ireland) Aaron Johnston	(Sweden) Oliver Solberg	Škoda Fabia R5 Evo	P
34	(France) Nicolas Ciamin	(France) Yannick Roche	(France) Nicolas Ciamin	Citroën C3 R5	MI
35	(France) Eric Camilli	(France) François-Xavier Buresi	(France) Eric Camilli	Citroën C3 R5	MI
36	(Chile) Emilio Fernández	(Argentina) Ruben Garcia	(Chile) Emilio Fernández	Škoda Fabia R5 Evo	P
37	(France) Yohan Rossel	(France) Benoît Fulcrand	(France) PH-Sport	Citroën C3 R5	MI
38	(Chile) Alberto Heller	(Spain) Marc Martí	(Chile) Alberto Heller	Ford Fiesta R5 Mk. II	MI
39	(Spain) Jan Solans	(Spain) Mauro Barreiro	(Spain) Jan Solans	Ford Fiesta R5 Mk. II	P
40	(Italy) Umberto Scandola	(Italy) Guido D'Amore	(Italy) Umberto Scandola	Hyundai NG i20 R5	MI
41	(Italy) "Pedro" (Note: Pseudonym of Massimo Pedretti.)	(Italy) Emmanuele Baldaccini	(Italy) "Pedro"	Ford Fiesta R5 Mk. II	P
42	(United States) Sean Johnston	(United States) Alexander Kihurani	(France) Saintéloc Junior Team	Citroën C3 R5	P
45	(Italy) Alberto Battistolli	(Italy) Simone Scattolin	(Italy) Alberto Battistolli	Škoda Fabia R5 Evo	P
46	(Italy) Luciano Cobbe	(Italy) Fabio Turco	(Italy) Luciano Cobbe	Škoda Fabia R5 Evo	P
Junior World Rally Championship entries
47	(Latvia) Mārtiņš Sesks	(Latvia) Renars Francis	(Latvia) LMT Autosporta Akadēmija	Ford Fiesta R2	P
48	(Finland) Sami Pajari	(Finland) Marko Salminen	(Finland) Team Flying Finn	Ford Fiesta R2	P
49	(Sweden) Tom Kristensson	(Sweden) Joakim Sjöberg	(Sweden) Tom Kristensson Motorsport	Ford Fiesta R2	P
50	(United Kingdom) Ruairi Bell	(United Kingdom) Darren Garrod	(United Kingdom) Ruairi Bell	Ford Fiesta R2	P
51	(Paraguay) Fabrizio Zaldívar	(Argentina) Fernando Mussano	(Paraguay) Fabrizio Zaldívar	Ford Fiesta R2	P
52	(Italy) Marco Pollara	(Italy) Maurizio Messina	(Italy) Marco Pollara	Ford Fiesta R2	P
53	(Italy) Enrico Oldrati	(Italy) Elia De Guio	(Italy) Enrico Oldrati	Ford Fiesta R2	P
54	(Italy) Fabio Andolfi	(Italy) Stefano Savoia	(Italy) Fabio Andolfi	Ford Fiesta R2	P
Other Major Entries
43	(Brazil) Ulysses Bertholdo	(Brazil) Gabriel Morales	(Italy) Motorsport Italia	Škoda Fabia R5	P
56	(Germany) Armin Kremer	(Germany) Ella Kremer	(Germany) Armin Kremer	Volkswagen Polo GTI R5	P

=== Route ===
==== Itinerary ====
All dates and times are CEST (UTC+2).

Date	Time	No.	Stage name	Distance
8 October	12:01	—	Olmedo [Shakedown]	3.96 km
Leg 1 — 95.25 km
9 October	07:50	SS1	Tempio Pausania 1	12.08 km
9 October	08:44	SS2	Erula — Tula 1	21.78 km
9 October	10:40	SS3	Tempio Pausania 2	12.08 km
9 October	11:34	SS4	Erula — Tula 2	21.78 km
9 October	16:14	SS5	Sedini — Castelsardo 1	14.72 km
9 October	16:59	SS6	Tergu — Osilo 1	12.81 km
Leg 2 — 101.69 km
10 October	07:37	SS7	Monte Lerno 1	22.08 km
10 October	08:38	SS8	Coiluna — Loelle 1	15.00 km
10 October	10:07	SS9	Monte Lerno 2	22.08 km
10 October	11:08	SS10	Coiluna — Loelle 2	15.00 km
10 October	16:08	SS11	Sedini — Castelsardo 2	14.72 km
10 October	17:02	SS12	Tergu — Osilo 2	12.81 km
Leg 3 — 41.90 km
11 October	08:15	SS13	Cala Flumini 1	14.06 km
11 October	09:08	SS14	Sassari — Argentiera 1	6.89 km
11 October	11:10	SS15	Cala Flumini 2	14.06 km
11 October	12:18	SS16	Sassari — Argentiera 2 [Power Stage]	6.89 km

== Report ==
=== World Rally Cars ===
Dani Sordo and Carlos del Barrio were the crew who set the benchmark, while a suspension issue created a back foot for Ott Tänak and Martin Järveoja. Kalle Rovanperä and Jonne Halttunen retired from the rally when they crashed out in the morning loop of the second leg. Sordo and del Barrio eventually won the rally for the second straight year. There was an epic battle for the runner-up spot between the crew of Thierry Neuville and Nicolas Gilsoul and Sebastien Ogier and Julien Ingrassia, with Neuville and Gilsoul ultimately came out on top.

==== Classification ====
Position		No.	Driver	Co-driver	Entrant	Car	Time	Difference	Points	
Event	Class	No.	Driver	Co-driver	Entrant	Car	Time	Difference	Event	Stage
1	1	6	Dani Sordo	Carlos del Barrio	Hyundai Shell Mobis WRT	Hyundai i20 Coupe WRC	2:41:37.5	0.0	25	1
2	2	11	Thierry Neuville	Nicolas Gilsoul	Hyundai Shell Mobis WRT	Hyundai i20 Coupe WRC	2:41:42.6	+5.1	18	4
3	3	17	Sebastien Ogier	Julien Ingrassia	Toyota Gazoo Racing WRT	Toyota Yaris WRC	2:41:42.6	+6.1	15	3
4	4	33	Elfyn Evans	Scott Martin	Toyota Gazoo Racing WRT	Toyota Yaris WRC	2:42:39.8	+1:02.3	12	2
5	5	3	Teemu Suninen	Jarmo Lehtinen	M-Sport Ford WRT	Ford Fiesta WRC	2:43:11.4	+1:33.9	10	0
6	6	8	Ott Tänak	Martin Järveoja	Hyundai Shell Mobis WRT	Hyundai i20 Coupe WRC	2:44:05.0	+2:27.5	8	5
7	7	7	Pierre-Louis Loubet	Vincent Landais	Hyundai 2C Competition	Hyundai i20 Coupe WRC	2:46:21.3	+4:43.8	6	0
15	8	22	Martin Prokop	Zdeněk Jůrka	MP-Sports	Ford Fiesta RS WRC	2:54:22.3	+12:44.8	0	0
25	9	44	Gus Greensmith	Elliott Edmondson	M-Sport Ford WRT	Ford Fiesta WRC	3:14:44.6	+33:07.1	0	0
Excluded		21	Petter Solberg	Andreas Mikkelsen	Saintéloc Junior Team	Citroën C3 WRC	Shakedown and Power Stage only		0	0
Retired SS14		18	Takamoto Katsuta	Daniel Barritt	Toyota Gazoo Racing WRT	Toyota Yaris WRC	Rolled		0	0
Retired SS8		69	Kalle Rovanperä	Jonne Halttunen	Toyota Gazoo Racing WRT	Toyota Yaris WRC	Accident		0	0
Retired SS2		4	Esapekka Lappi	Janne Ferm	M-Sport Ford WRT	Ford Fiesta WRC	Engine		0	0

==== Special stages ====
Date	No.	Stage name	Distance	Winners	Car	Time	Class leaders
8 October	—	Olmedo [Shakedown]	3.96 km	Evans / Martin; Tänak / Järveoja	Toyota Yaris WRC; Hyundai i20 Coupe WRC	2:13.6	—N/a
9 October	SS1	Tempio Pausania 1	12.08 km	Suninen / Lehtinen	Ford Fiesta WRC	9:59.8	Suninen / Lehtinen
9 October	SS2	Erula — Tula 1	21.78 km	Sordo / del Barrio	Hyundai i20 Coupe WRC	16:50.0	Suninen / Lehtinen
9 October	SS3	Tempio Pausania 2	12.08 km	Evans / Martin	Toyota Yaris WRC	9:49.0	Suninen / Lehtinen
9 October	SS4	Erula — Tula 2	21.78 km	Sordo / del Barrio	Hyundai i20 Coupe WRC	16:33.1	Sordo / del Barrio
9 October	SS5	Sedini — Castelsardo 1	14.72 km	Sordo / del Barrio	Hyundai i20 Coupe WRC	10:56.7	Sordo / del Barrio
9 October	SS6	Tergu — Osilo 1	12.81 km	Sordo / del Barrio	Hyundai i20 Coupe WRC	8:16.5	Sordo / del Barrio
10 October	SS7	Monte Lerno 1	22.08 km	Ogier / Ingrassia	Toyota Yaris WRC	12:46.9	Sordo / del Barrio
10 October	SS8	Coiluna — Loelle 1	15.00 km	Sordo / del Barrio	Hyundai i20 Coupe WRC	8:52.5	Sordo / del Barrio
10 October	SS9	Monte Lerno 2	22.08 km	Ogier / Ingrassia	Toyota Yaris WRC	12:29.6	Sordo / del Barrio
10 October	SS10	Coiluna — Loelle 2	15.00 km	Neuville / Gilsoul	Hyundai i20 Coupe WRC	8:42.9	Sordo / del Barrio
10 October	SS11	Sedini — Castelsardo 2	14.72 km	Ogier / Ingrassia	Toyota Yaris WRC	10:39.3	Sordo / del Barrio
10 October	SS12	Tergu — Osilo 2	12.81 km	Ogier / Ingrassia	Toyota Yaris WRC	8:03.4	Sordo / del Barrio
11 October	SS13	Cala Flumini 1	14.06 km	Ogier / Ingrassia	Toyota Yaris WRC	8:35.5	Sordo / del Barrio
11 October	SS14	Sassari — Argentiera 1	6.89 km	Neuville / Gilsoul	Hyundai i20 Coupe WRC	4:51.3	Sordo / del Barrio
11 October	SS15	Cala Flumini 2	14.06 km	Ogier / Ingrassia	Toyota Yaris WRC	8:23.2	Sordo / del Barrio
11 October	SS16	Sassari — Argentiera 2 [Power Stage]	6.89 km	Tänak / Järveoja	Hyundai i20 Coupe WRC	4:45.7	Sordo / del Barrio

==== Championship standings ====
Pos.	Drivers' championships			Co-drivers' championships			Manufacturers' championships		
Pos.	Move	Driver	Points	Move	Co-driver	Points	Move	Manufacturer	Points
1		Elfyn Evans	111		Scott Martin	111	1	Hyundai Shell Mobis WRT	208
2		Sébastien Ogier	97		Julien Ingrassia	97	1	Toyota Gazoo Racing WRT	201
3	2	Thierry Neuville	87	2	Nicolas Gilsoul	87		M-Sport Ford WRT	117
4	1	Ott Tänak	83	1	Martin Järveoja	83		Hyundai 2C Competition	8
5	1	Kalle Rovanperä	70	1	Jonne Halttunen	70			

=== World Rally Championship-2 ===
A trouble-free run assured championship leaders Pontus Tidemand and Patrik Barth to win the rally. Adrien Fourmaux and Renaud Jamoul were pushing hard to catch the lead until they suffered a mechanical issue.

==== Classification ====
Position		No.	Driver	Co-driver	Entrant	Car	Time	Difference	Points	
Event	Class	No.	Driver	Co-driver	Entrant	Car	Time	Difference	Class	Event
10	1	23	Pontus Tidemand	Patrik Barth	Toksport WRT	Škoda Fabia R5 Evo	2:51:58.4	0.0	25	1
12	2	27	Ole Christian Veiby	Jonas Andersson	Hyundai Motorsport N	Hyundai NG i20 R5	2:52:27.2	+28.8	18	0
13	3	28	Eyvind Brynildsen	Ilka Minor	Toksport WRT	Škoda Fabia R5 Evo	2:52:48.1	+49.7	15	0
14	4	24	Mads Østberg	Torstein Eriksen	PH-Sport	Citroën C3 R5	2:54:06.7	+2:08.3	12	0
Retired SS13		26	Nikolay Gryazin	Konstantin Aleksandrov	Hyundai Motorsport N	Hyundai NG i20 R5	Radiator		0	0
Retired SS9		25	Adrien Fourmaux	Renaud Jamoul	M-Sport Ford WRT	Ford Fiesta R5 Mk. II	Mechanical		0	0

==== Special stages ====
Date	No.	Stage name	Distance	Winners	Car	Time	Class leaders
8 October	—	Olmedo [Shakedown]	3.96 km	Østberg / Eriksen	Citroën C3 R5	2:20.8	—N/a
9 October	SS1	Tempio Pausania 1	12.08 km	Fourmaux / Jamoul	Ford Fiesta R5 Mk. II	10:24.3	Fourmaux / Jamoul
9 October	SS2	Erula — Tula 1	21.78 km	Veiby / Andersson	Hyundai NG i20 R5	17:31.5	Veiby / Andersson
9 October	SS3	Tempio Pausania 2	12.08 km	Fourmaux / Jamoul	Ford Fiesta R5 Mk. II	10:15.8	Fourmaux / Jamoul
9 October	SS4	Erula — Tula 2	21.78 km	Veiby / Andersson	Hyundai NG i20 R5	17:22.0	Fourmaux / Jamoul
9 October	SS5	Sedini — Castelsardo 1	14.72 km	Østberg / Eriksen	Citroën C3 R5	11:16.5	Tidemand / Barth
9 October	SS6	Tergu — Osilo 1	12.81 km	Fourmaux / Jamoul	Ford Fiesta R5 Mk. II	8:30.8	Tidemand / Barth
10 October	SS7	Monte Lerno 1	22.08 km	Østberg / Eriksen	Citroën C3 R5	13:27.0	Tidemand / Barth
10 October	SS8	Coiluna — Loelle 1	15.00 km	Østberg / Eriksen	Citroën C3 R5	9:16.2	Tidemand / Barth
10 October	SS9	Monte Lerno 2	22.08 km	Østberg / Eriksen	Citroën C3 R5	13:04.7	Tidemand / Barth
10 October	SS10	Coiluna — Loelle 2	15.00 km	Østberg / Eriksen	Citroën C3 R5	9:08.3	Tidemand / Barth
10 October	SS11	Sedini — Castelsardo 2	14.72 km	Østberg / Eriksen	Citroën C3 R5	11:02.3	Tidemand / Barth
10 October	SS12	Tergu — Osilo 2	12.81 km	Østberg / Eriksen	Citroën C3 R5	8:22.9	Tidemand / Barth
11 October	SS13	Cala Flumini 1	14.06 km	Østberg / Eriksen	Citroën C3 R5	9:06.2	Tidemand / Barth
11 October	SS14	Sassari — Argentiera 1	6.89 km	Østberg / Eriksen	Citroën C3 R5	5:07.1	Tidemand / Barth
11 October	SS15	Cala Flumini 2	14.06 km	Østberg / Eriksen	Citroën C3 R5	8:53.1	Tidemand / Barth
11 October	SS16	Sassari — Argentiera 2	6.89 km	Østberg / Eriksen	Citroën C3 R5	5:05.6	Tidemand / Barth

==== Championship standings ====
Pos.	Drivers' championships			Co-drivers' championships			Manufacturers' championships		
Pos.	Move	Driver	Points	Move	Co-driver	Points	Move	Manufacturer	Points
1		Pontus Tidemand	105		Patrick Barth	105		Toksport WRT	147
2		Mads Østberg	87		Torstein Eriksen	87	1	Hyundai Motorsport N	102
3		Adrien Fourmaux	66		Renaud Jamoul	66	1	M-Sport Ford WRT	88
4	1	Ole Christian Veiby	51	1	Jonas Andersson	51		PH-Sport	87
5	1	Nikolay Gryazin	51	1	Yaroslav Fedorov	41			

=== World Rally Championship-3 ===
Oliver Solberg and Aaron Johnston led the class after the first leg. However, they picked up a puncture on Saturday morning, which dropped them back to third. Despite reclaiming the lead after SS11, they went off the road during the final stage of the day, handing the lead back to Jari Huttunen and Mikko Lukka. Huttunen and Lukka's lead was threatened by Kajetan Kajetanowicz and Maciej Szczepaniak until the Polish crew picked up a puncture during the second to last stage.

==== Classification ====
Position		No.	Driver	Co-driver	Entrant	Car	Time	Difference	Points	
Event	Class	No.	Driver	Co-driver	Entrant	Car	Time	Difference	Class	Event
8	1	30	Jari Huttunen	Mikko Lukka	Jari Huttunen	Hyundai NG i20 R5	2:50:19.2	0.0	25	4
9	2	31	Kajetan Kajetanowicz	Maciej Szczepaniak	Kajetan Kajetanowicz	Škoda Fabia R5 Evo	2:51:40.4	+1:21.2	18	2
11	3	29	Marco Bulacia Wilkinson	Marcelo Der Ohannesian	Marco Bulacia Wilkinson	Citroën C3 R5	2:52:26.7	+2:07.5	15	0
16	4	40	Umberto Scandola	Guido D'Amore	Umberto Scandola	Hyundai NG i20 R5	2:56:04.5	+5:45.3	12	0
17	5	38	Alberto Heller	Marc Martí	Alberto Heller	Ford Fiesta R5 Mk. II	2:59:55.5	+9:36.3	10	0
18	6	32	Oliver Solberg	Aaron Johnston	Oliver Solberg	Škoda Fabia R5 Evo	3:00:34.2	+10:15.0	8	0
21	7	45	Alberto Battistolli	Simone Scattolin	Alberto Battistolli	Škoda Fabia R5 Evo	3:05:26.7	+15:07.5	6	0
35	8	46	Luciano Cobbe	Fabio Turco	Luciano Cobbe	Škoda Fabia R5 Evo	3:38:08.5	+47:49.3	4	0
36	9	34	Nicolas Ciamin	Yannick Roche	Nicolas Ciamin	Citroën C3 R5	3:41:22.3	+51:03.1	2	0
38	10	36	Emilio Fernández	Ruben Garcia	Emilio Fernández	Škoda Fabia R5 Evo	3:46:42.4	+56:23.2	1	0
39	11	37	Yohan Rossel	Benoît Fulcrand	PH-Sport	Citroën C3 R5	3:49:18.4	+58:59.2	0	0
Retired SS15		42	Sean Johnston	Alexander Kihurani	Saintéloc Junior Team	Citroën C3 R5	Accident		0	0
Retired SS10		39	Jan Solans	Mauro Barreiro	Jan Solans	Ford Fiesta R5 Mk. II	Mechanical		0	0
Retired SS9		41	"Pedro"	Emmanuele Baldaccini	"Pedro"	Ford Fiesta R5 Mk. II	Accident		0	0
Retired SS7		35	Eric Camilli	François-Xavier Buresi	Eric Camilli	Citroën C3 R5	Mechanical		0	0

==== Special stages ====
Date	No.	Stage name	Distance	Winners	Car	Time	Class leaders
8 October	—	Olmedo [Shakedown]	3.96 km	Scandola / D'Amore	Hyundai NG i20 R5	2:22.0	—N/a
9 October	SS1	Tempio Pausania 1	12.08 km	Solberg / Johnston	Škoda Fabia R5 Evo	10:16.6	Solberg / Johnston
9 October	SS2	Erula — Tula 1	21.78 km	Rossel / Fulcrand	Citroën C3 R5	17:38.0	Solberg / Johnston
9 October	SS3	Tempio Pausania 2	12.08 km	Huttunen / Lukka	Hyundai NG i20 R5	10:07.2	Solberg / Johnston
9 October	SS4	Erula — Tula 2	21.78 km	Rossel / Fulcrand	Citroën C3 R5	17:24.0	Solberg / Johnston
9 October	SS5	Sedini — Castelsardo 1	14.72 km	Rossel / Fulcrand	Citroën C3 R5	11:14.1	Solberg / Johnston
9 October	SS6	Tergu — Osilo 1	12.81 km	Ciamin / Roche	Citroën C3 R5	8:25.4	Solberg / Johnston
10 October	SS7	Monte Lerno 1	22.08 km	Solberg / Johnston	Škoda Fabia R5 Evo	13:30.3	Solberg / Johnston
10 October	SS8	Coiluna — Loelle 1	15.00 km	Kajetanowicz / Szczepaniak	Škoda Fabia R5 Evo	9:24.3	Solberg / Johnston
10 October	SS9	Monte Lerno 2	22.08 km	Kajetanowicz / Szczepaniak	Škoda Fabia R5 Evo	13:20.2	Huttunen / Lukka
10 October	SS10	Coiluna — Loelle 2	15.00 km	Solberg / Johnston	Škoda Fabia R5 Evo	9:04.9	Huttunen / Lukka
10 October	SS11	Sedini — Castelsardo 2	14.72 km	Solberg / Johnston	Škoda Fabia R5 Evo	10:57.7	Solberg / Johnston
10 October	SS12	Tergu — Osilo 2	12.81 km	Bulacia Wilkinson / Der Ohannesian	Citroën C3 R5	8:22.3	Huttunen / Lukka
11 October	SS13	Cala Flumini 1	14.06 km	Rossel / Fulcrand	Citroën C3 R5	9:13.9	Huttunen / Lukka
11 October	SS14	Sassari — Argentiera 1	6.89 km	Kajetanowicz / Szczepaniak	Škoda Fabia R5 Evo	5:12.0	Huttunen / Lukka
11 October	SS15	Cala Flumini 2	14.06 km	Huttunen / Lukka	Hyundai NG i20 R5	8:54.7	Huttunen / Lukka
11 October	SS16	Sassari — Argentiera 2	6.89 km	Solberg / Johnston	Škoda Fabia R5 Evo	5:07.9	Huttunen / Lukka

==== Championship standings ====
Pos.	Drivers' championships			Co-drivers' championships		
Pos.	Move	Driver	Points	Move	Co-driver	Points
1		Marco Bulacia Wilkinson	70		Mikko Lukka	68
2		Jari Huttunen	68		Maciek Szczepaniak	55
3		Kajetan Kajetanowicz	55	1	Marcelo Der Ohannesian	45
4		Oliver Solberg	43	1	Aaron Johnston	43
5		Nicolas Ciamin	28		Marc Martí	37

=== Junior World Rally Championship ===
Steered out of dramas, Tom Kristensson and Joakim Sjöberg held a comfortable lead going onto Saturday. The Swedish crew stayed cool on Saturday, holding a huge gap of over eight minutes onto Sunday. Eventually, they won the rally to close the gap to championship leaders.

==== Classification ====
Position		No.	Driver	Co-driver	Entrant	Car	Time	Difference	Points	
Event	Class	No.	Driver	Co-driver	Entrant	Car	Time	Difference	Class	Stage
22	1	49	Tom Kristensson	Joakim Sjöberg	Tom Kristensson Motorsport	Ford Fiesta R2	3:07:49.1	0.0	25	4
27	2	51	Fabrizio Zaldívar	Fernando Mussano	Fabrizio Zaldívar	Ford Fiesta R2	3:19:14.5	+11:25.4	18	0
34	3	47	Mārtiņš Sesks	Renars Francis	LMT Autosporta Akadēmija	Ford Fiesta R2	3:37:45.3	+29:56.2	15	6
37	4	53	Enrico Oldrati	Elia De Guio	Enrico Oldrati	Ford Fiesta R2	3:44:50.2	+37:01.1	12	0
44	5	48	Sami Pajari	Marko Salminen	Team Flying Finn	Ford Fiesta R2	4:06:03.8	+58:14.7	10	5
47	6	52	Marco Pollara	Maurizio Messina	Marco Pollara	Ford Fiesta R2	4:24:39.5	+1:16:50.4	8	0
Retired SS16		50	Ruairi Bell	Darren Garrod	Ruairi Bell	Ford Fiesta R2	Mechanical		0	0
Did not start		54	Fabio Andolfi	Stefano Savoia	Fabio Andolfi	Ford Fiesta R2	Illness		0	0

==== Special stages ====
Date	No.	Stage name	Distance	Winners	Car	Time	Class leaders
8 October	—	Olmedo [Shakedown]	3.96 km	Sesks / Francis	Ford Fiesta R2	2:38.9	—N/a
9 October	SS1	Tempio Pausania 1	12.08 km	Kristensson / Sjöberg	Ford Fiesta R2	10:59.3	Kristensson / Sjöberg
9 October	SS2	Erula — Tula 1	21.78 km	Sesks / Francis	Ford Fiesta R2	19:16.7	Kristensson / Sjöberg
9 October	SS3	Tempio Pausania 2	12.08 km	Kristensson / Sjöberg	Ford Fiesta R2	11:01.4	Kristensson / Sjöberg
9 October	SS4	Erula — Tula 2	21.78 km	Pajari / Salminen	Ford Fiesta R2	19:21.9	Kristensson / Sjöberg
9 October	SS5	Sedini — Castelsardo 1	14.72 km	Kristensson / Sjöberg	Ford Fiesta R2	12:43.1	Kristensson / Sjöberg
9 October	SS6	Tergu — Osilo 1	12.81 km	Pajari / Salminen	Ford Fiesta R2	9:19.5	Kristensson / Sjöberg
10 October	SS7	Monte Lerno 1	22.08 km	Sesks / Francis	Ford Fiesta R2	14:39.3	Kristensson / Sjöberg
10 October	SS8	Coiluna — Loelle 1	15.00 km	Sesks / Francis	Ford Fiesta R2	10:14.7	Kristensson / Sjöberg
10 October	SS9	Monte Lerno 2	22.08 km	Sesks / Francis	Ford Fiesta R2	14:31.3	Kristensson / Sjöberg
10 October	SS10	Coiluna — Loelle 2	15.00 km	Kristensson / Sjöberg	Ford Fiesta R2	10:03.3	Kristensson / Sjöberg
10 October	SS11	Sedini — Castelsardo 2	14.72 km	Sesks / Francis	Ford Fiesta R2	12:24.1	Kristensson / Sjöberg
10 October	SS12	Tergu — Osilo 2	12.81 km	Sesks / Francis	Ford Fiesta R2	9:13.3	Kristensson / Sjöberg
11 October	SS13	Cala Flumini 1	14.06 km	Pajari / Salminen	Ford Fiesta R2	9:57.6	Kristensson / Sjöberg
11 October	SS14	Sassari — Argentiera 1	6.89 km	Pajari / Salminen	Ford Fiesta R2	5:38.2	Kristensson / Sjöberg
11 October	SS15	Cala Flumini 2	14.06 km	Pajari / Salminen	Ford Fiesta R2	9:57.6	Kristensson / Sjöberg
11 October	SS16	Sassari — Argentiera 2	6.89 km	Pajari / Salminen	Ford Fiesta R2	5:32.9	Kristensson / Sjöberg

==== Championship standings ====
Pos.	Drivers' championships			Co-drivers' championships			Nations' championships		
Pos.	Move	Driver	Points	Move	Co-driver	Points	Move	Country	Points
1		Mārtiņš Sesks	68		Renars Francis	68		Latvia	58
2	1	Tom Kristensson	58	1	Joakim Sjöberg	58	2	Sweden	50
3	1	Sami Pajari	55	1	Marko Salminen	55	1	Finland	40
4	4	Fabrizio Zaldívar	34	3	Fernando Mussano	34	3	Paraguay	34
5	4	Marco Pollara	19	4	Maurizio Messina	19	2	Estonia	30

== Notes ==
Previous rally: 2020 Rally Turkey	2020 FIA World Rally Championship	Next rally: 2020 Rally Monza
Previous rally: 2019 Rally Italia Sardegna	2020 Rally Italia Sardegna	Next rally: 2021 Rally Italia Sardegna
