= Hyundai i20 R5 =

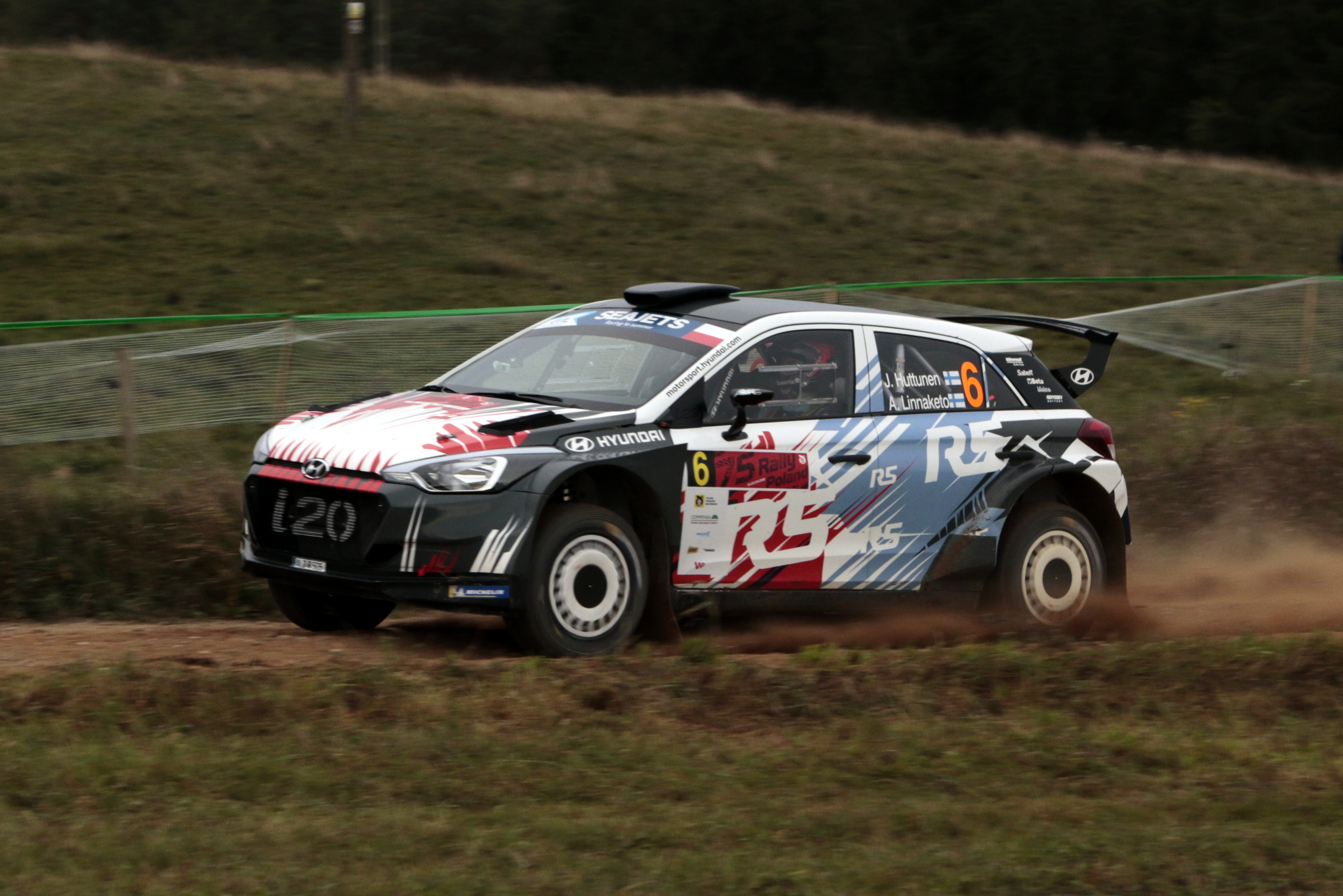
- Jari Huttunen and Antti Linnaketo driving an i20 R5 at the 2018 Rally Poland

Overview
- Manufacturer: Hyundai Motorsport
- Model years: 2016–present

Body and chassis
- Class: R5
- Layout: 4-wheel drive
- Platform: Hyundai i20
- Related: Hyundai i20 Coupe WRC

Powertrain
- Engine: Hyundai T-GDI 1.6 L (98 cu in) 4-cylinder, 16-valve
- Power output: 280 hp (209 kW; 284 PS)
- Transmission: 5-speed sequential manual

Dimensions
- Curb weight: 1,230 kg (2,711.7 lb)

Chronology
- Successor: Hyundai i20 N Rally2

The Hyundai i20 R5 is a rally car built by Hyundai Motorsport and based upon the Hyundai i20 road car. It is built to R5 regulations. The i20 R5 made its competitive début at the 2016 Tour de Corse, where it was driven by Kevin Abbring and Sebastian Marshall. The car currently competes in the World Rally Championship-2 and the European Rally Championship where it is entered by Hyundai's factory team and various privateers. Its successor, the Hyundai i20 N Rally2, was introduced in 2021.

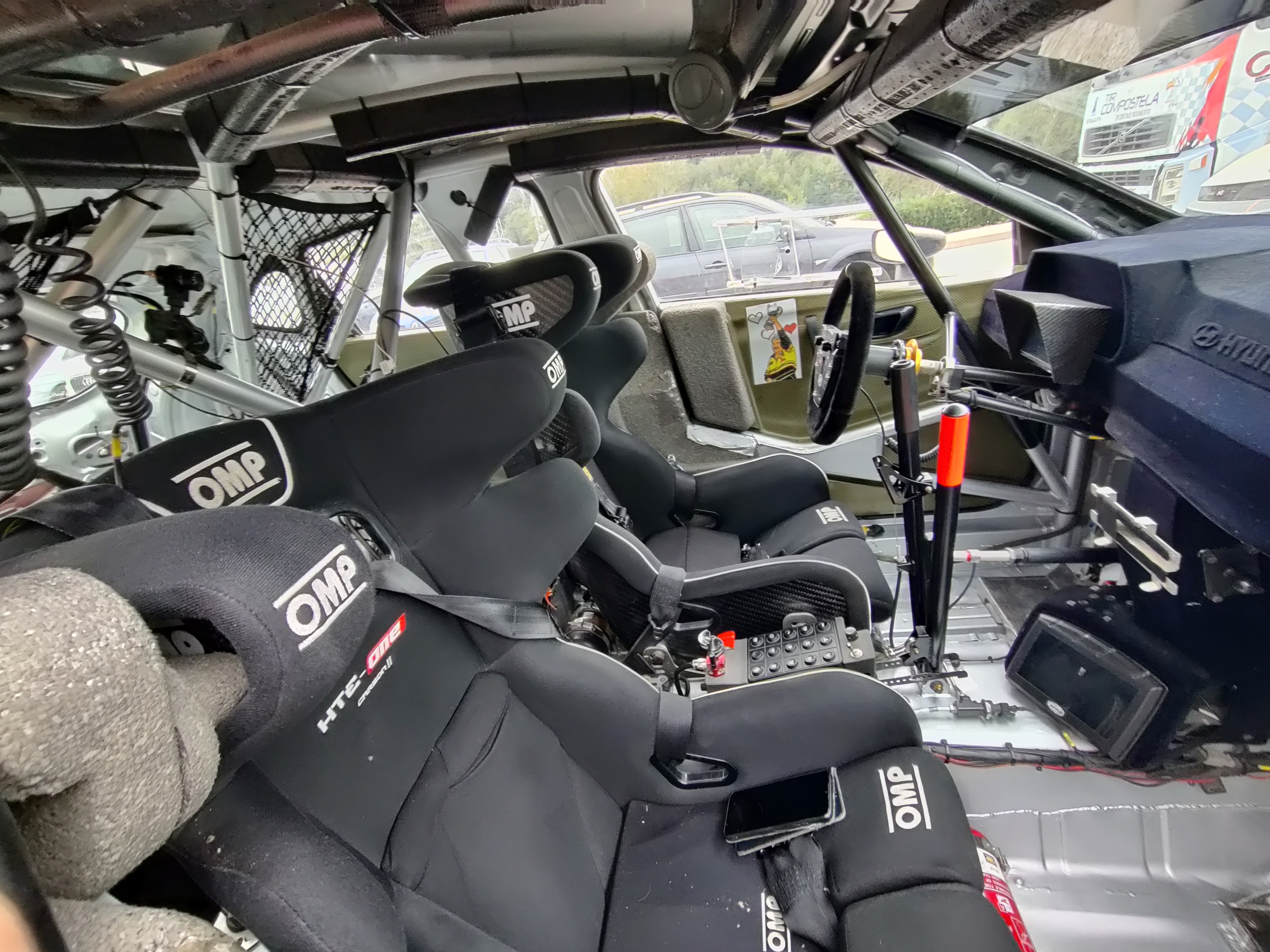
Inside Iván Ares car

== Results ==
=== World Rally Championship-2 victories ===
No.	Event	Year	Driver	Co-driver
1	(Italy) 2021 Rally Italia Sardegna	2021	(Finland) Jari Huttunen	(Finland) Mikko Lukka

=== World Rally Championship-3 victories ===
No.	Event	Year	Driver	Co-driver
1	2020 Rally Sweden	2020	(Finland) Jari Huttunen	(Finland) Mikko Lukka
2	(Italy) 2020 Rally Italia Sardegna	2020	(Finland) Jari Huttunen	(Finland) Mikko Lukka

== See also ==
- Hyundai i20 Coupe WRC
- Group R
  - Citroën C3 R5
  - Ford Fiesta R5
  - Škoda Fabia R5
  - Volkswagen Polo GTI R5
