= 2C Compétition =

French rally team

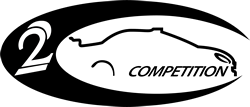
- Base: Thiers, France
- Team principal(s): Florent Peronnet
- Drivers: (France) Pierre-Louis Loubet; (Spain) Nil Solans; (Sweden) Oliver Solberg; (Norway) Ole Christian Veiby
- Chassis: Hyundai i20 Coupe WRC
- Tyres: Pirelli

World Rally Championship history
- Debut: 2020
- Manufacturers' Championships: 0
- Drivers' Championships: 0
- Rally wins: 0

2C Compétition is a French rally team based in Thiers, Puy-de-Dôme, France. It is owned by the company SARL 2 C and was founded in 2009.

== Competition history ==
The team were responsible for running the Škoda Fabia R5 cars that propelled Pierre-Louis Loubet and Vincent Landais to WRC2 championship title wins in 2019.

The team entered the World Rally Championship for Manufacturers in 2020 and 2021 using a Hyundai i20 Coupe WRC. WRC regulations at the time insisted the name of the manufacturer had to be included in the name of the team entry, thus the team competed as Hyundai 2C Compétition. It's also likely Hyundai supported the entry as drivers Loubet and Ole Christian Veiby were part of their junior driver programme.

In 2022, the team competed in the American Rally Association national championship with Ken Block driving its Hyundai i20 Coupe WRC. To assist with logistics they opened a base in Indianapolis, Indiana.

In 2023, 2C Compétition partnered with Hyundai to contest as the manufacturer's WRC2 entry using their Hyundai i20 N Rally2 cars. Reports suggested they had ambitions to contest the WRC using Rally1 cars but the decision 'was not in their hands'.

== Rally results ==
=== WRC results ===
Year	Driver	Rounds												Points	WCM
Year	Driver	1	2	3	4	5	6	7	8	9	10	11	12	Points	WCM
2020	(France) Pierre-Louis Loubet	MON	SWE	MEX	EST; Ret	TUR; Ret	ITA; 7	MNZ						8	4th
2020	(Norway) Ole Christian Veiby	MON	SWE	MEX	EST	TUR	ITA	MNZ; Ret						8	4th
2021	(France) Pierre-Louis Loubet	MON; 16	ARC; 39	CRO; 29	POR; Ret	ITA; Ret	KEN; WD	EST; 7	BEL; 68	GRE; Ret	FIN	ESP; WD	MNZ	68	4th
2021	(Sweden) Oliver Solberg	MON	ARC; 7	CRO	POR	ITA; WD	KEN; Ret	EST	BEL	GRE	FIN	ESP; 7	MNZ; 5	68	4th
2021	(Spain) Nil Solans	MON	ARC	CRO	POR	ITA	KEN	EST	BEL	GRE	FIN	ESP; 8	MNZ	68	4th
