= Hyundai i20 Coupe WRC =

Hyundai World Rally Car

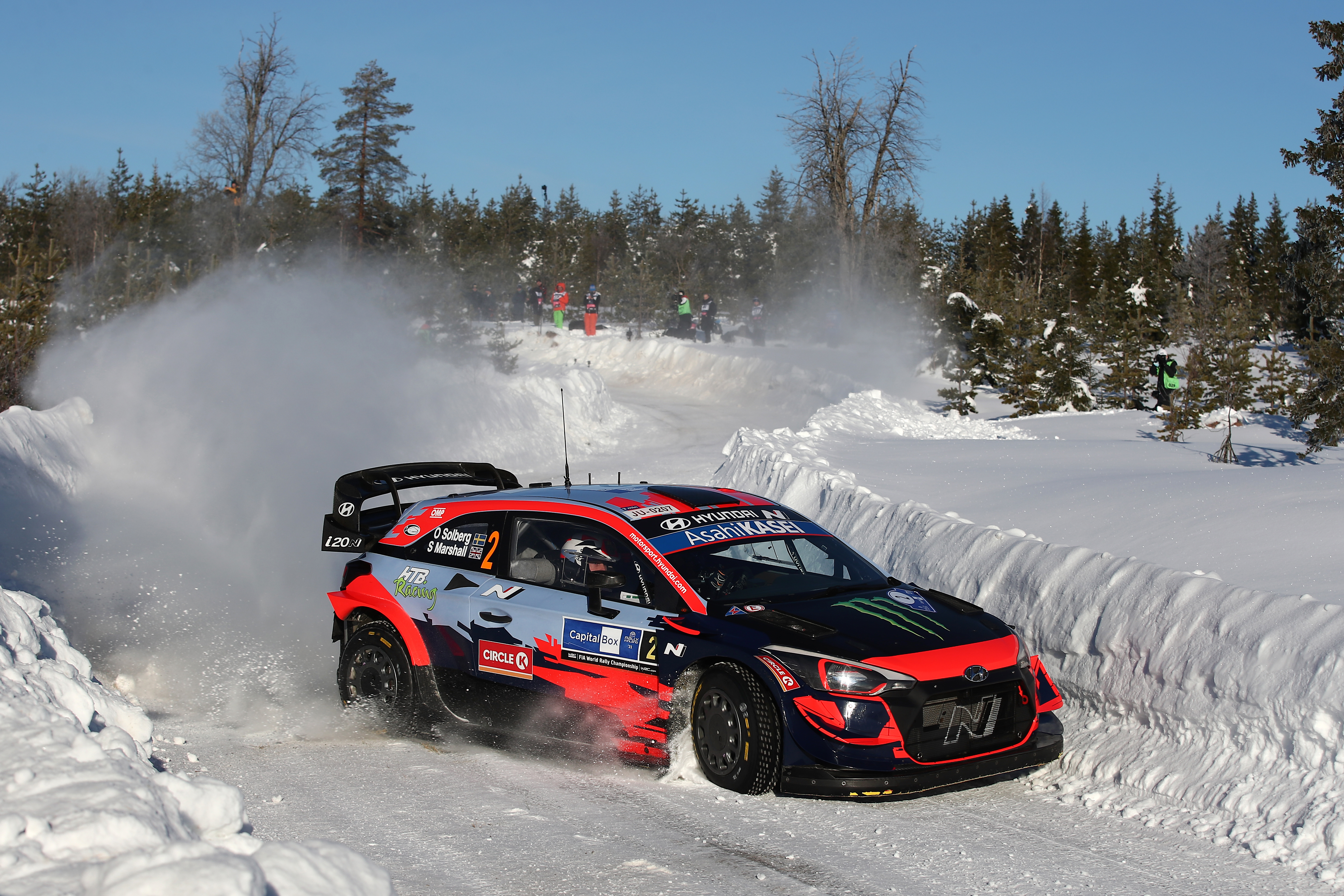
- The No. 2 i20 Coupe WRC during the 2021 Arctic Rally.
- Category: World Rally Car
- Constructor: Hyundai
- Designer: Bertrand Vallat
- Predecessor: Hyundai i20 WRC
- Successor: Hyundai i20 N Rally1

Technical specifications
- Suspension: MacPherson
- Length: 4,100 mm
- Width: 1,875 mm
- Axle track: 1,665 mm
- Wheelbase: 2,570 mm
- Engine: Bespoke Hyundai Motorsport Global Race Engine 1,600 cc (97.6 cu in) I4 turbo direct injection
- Transmission: Sequential gearbox, six forward gears and one reverse with paddle shift Four-wheel drive Hydraulic in centre, mechanical with ramps in front and rear differential
- Weight: 1,190 kg
- Fuel: Panta
- Lubricants: Shell Helix Ultra
- Brakes: Ventilated Brembo disc brakes (370mm on tarmac, 300mm on gravel). Air-cooled 4 piston callipers.
- Tyres: Michelin (2017-2020) later Pirelli P Zero (for tarmac), Cinturato (for wet tarmac), Sottozero (for ice/snow) and Scorpion (for gravel, clay and rest of dirt-type surfaces) (2021)
- Clutch: Cerametallic twin-disk

Competition history (WRC)
- Notable entrants: (South Korea) Hyundai Motorsport; (France) Hyundai 2C Competition
- Notable drivers: (Republic of Ireland) Craig Breen (France) Sébastien Loeb (France) Pierre-Louis Loubet (Norway) Andreas Mikkelsen (Belgium) Thierry Neuville (New Zealand) Hayden Paddon (Spain) Dani Sordo (Sweden) Oliver Solberg (Estonia) Ott Tänak
- Debut: (Monaco) 2017 Monte Carlo Rally
- First win: (France) 2017 Tour de Corse
- Last win: (Spain) 2021 Rally Catalunya
- Last event: (Italy) 2021 Rally Monza
Races	Wins	Podiums	Titles
58	17	62	2
- Constructors' Championships: 2 (2019, 2020)

The Hyundai i20 Coupe WRC (originally known as the Hyundai New Generation i20 WRC) is a World Rally Car built by Hyundai for use in the World Rally Championship starting in 2017. It is based on the Hyundai i20 subcompact car, and is the successor to the Hyundai i20 WRC used between 2014 and 2015.

Three i20 Coupe WRCs were entered for the 2017 season, where they were driven by Thierry Neuville, Hayden Paddon and Dani Sordo. Later in the season they also signed Andreas Mikkelsen. Neuville scored four wins and eight podiums, finishing runner-up behind Ogier, who switched to M-Sport.

All four drivers continued in the 2018 season. Neuville won three races and claimed six podiums, but was again outscored by Ogier.

== World Rally Championship results ==
=== Championship titles ===
Year	Title	Competitor	Entries	Wins	Podiums	Points
2019	FIA World Rally Championship for Manufacturers	(South Korea) Hyundai Motorsport	39	4	13	380
2020	FIA World Rally Championship for Manufacturers	(South Korea) Hyundai Motorsport	21	3	11	241

=== WRC victories ===
Year	No.	Event	Surface	Driver	Co-driver	Entrant
2017	1	(France) 2017 Tour de Corse	Tarmac	(Belgium) Thierry Neuville	(Belgium) Nicolas Gilsoul	(South Korea) Hyundai Motorsport
2017	2	2017 Rally Argentina	Gravel	(Belgium) Thierry Neuville	(Belgium) Nicolas Gilsoul	(South Korea) Hyundai Motorsport
2017	3	2017 Rally Poland	Gravel	(Belgium) Thierry Neuville	(Belgium) Nicolas Gilsoul	(South Korea) Hyundai Motorsport
2017	4	2017 Rally Australia	Gravel	(Belgium) Thierry Neuville	(Belgium) Nicolas Gilsoul	(South Korea) Hyundai Motorsport
2018	5	2018 Rally Sweden	Snow	(Belgium) Thierry Neuville	(Belgium) Nicolas Gilsoul	(South Korea) Hyundai Motorsport
2018	6	2018 Rally de Portugal	Gravel	(Belgium) Thierry Neuville	(Belgium) Nicolas Gilsoul	(South Korea) Hyundai Motorsport
2018	7	(Italy) 2018 Rally Italia Sardegna	Gravel	(Belgium) Thierry Neuville	(Belgium) Nicolas Gilsoul	(South Korea) Hyundai Motorsport
2019	8	(France) 2019 Tour de Corse	Tarmac	(Belgium) Thierry Neuville	(Belgium) Nicolas Gilsoul	(South Korea) Hyundai Motorsport
2019	9	2019 Rally Argentina	Gravel	(Belgium) Thierry Neuville	(Belgium) Nicolas Gilsoul	(South Korea) Hyundai Motorsport
2019	10	(Italy) 2019 Rally Italia Sardegna	Gravel	(Spain) Dani Sordo	(Spain) Carlos del Barrio	(South Korea) Hyundai Motorsport
2019	11	(Spain) 2019 Rally Catalunya	Mixed	(Belgium) Thierry Neuville	(Belgium) Nicolas Gilsoul	(South Korea) Hyundai Motorsport
2020	12	(Monaco) 2020 Monte Carlo Rally	Mixed	(Belgium) Thierry Neuville	(Belgium) Nicolas Gilsoul	(South Korea) Hyundai Motorsport
2020	13	2020 Rally Estonia	Gravel	(Estonia) Ott Tänak	(Estonia) Martin Järveoja	(South Korea) Hyundai Motorsport
2020	14	(Italy) 2020 Rally Italia Sardegna	Gravel	(Spain) Dani Sordo	(Spain) Carlos del Barrio	(South Korea) Hyundai Motorsport
2021	15	(Finland) 2021 Arctic Rally	Snow	(Estonia) Ott Tänak	(Estonia) Martin Järveoja	(South Korea) Hyundai Motorsport
2021	16	(Belgium) 2021 Ypres Rally	Tarmac	(Belgium) Thierry Neuville	(Belgium) Martijn Wydaeghe	(South Korea) Hyundai Motorsport
2021	17	(Spain) 2021 Rally Catalunya	Tarmac	(Belgium) Thierry Neuville	(Belgium) Martijn Wydaeghe	(South Korea) Hyundai Motorsport

=== Complete World Rally Championship results ===
Year	Entrant	Driver	Rounds														Points	WCM pos.
Year	Entrant	Driver	1	2	3	4	5	6	7	8	9	10	11	12	13	14	Points	WCM pos.
2017	(South Korea) Hyundai Motorsport	(Belgium) Thierry Neuville	MON; 15	SWE; 13	MEX; 3	FRA; 1	ARG; 1	POR; 2	ITA; 3	POL; 1	FIN; 6	GER; 44	ESP; Ret	GBR; 2	AUS; 1		345	2nd
2017	(South Korea) Hyundai Motorsport	(Spain) Dani Sordo	MON; 4	SWE; 4	MEX; 8	FRA; 3	ARG; 8	POR; 3	ITA; 12	POL; 4	FIN; 9	GER; 34	ESP; 15	GBR; 10	AUS		345	2nd
2017	(South Korea) Hyundai Motorsport	(New Zealand) Hayden Paddon	MON; Ret	SWE; 7	MEX; 5	FRA; 6	ARG; 6	POR; Ret	ITA; Ret	POL; 2	FIN; Ret	GER; 8	ESP	GBR; 8	AUS; 3		345	2nd
2017	(South Korea) Hyundai Motorsport	(Norway) Andreas Mikkelsen	MON	SWE	MEX	FRA	ARG	POR	ITA	POL	FIN	GER	ESP; 18	GBR; 4	AUS; 11		345	2nd
2018	(South Korea) Hyundai Shell Mobis WRT	(Belgium) Thierry Neuville	MON; 5	SWE; 1	MEX; 6	FRA; 3	ARG; 2	POR; 1	ITA; 1	FIN; 9	GER; 2	TUR; 16	GBR; 5	ESP; 4	AUS; Ret		341	2nd
2018	(South Korea) Hyundai Shell Mobis WRT	(Norway) Andreas Mikkelsen	MON; 13	SWE; 3	MEX; 4	FRA; 7	ARG; 5	POR; 16	ITA; 18	FIN; 10	GER; 6	TUR; 5	GBR; 6	ESP; 10	AUS; 11		341	2nd
2018	(South Korea) Hyundai Shell Mobis WRT	(Spain) Dani Sordo	MON; Ret	SWE	MEX; 2	FRA; 4	ARG; 3	POR; 4	ITA	FIN	GER; Ret	TUR	GBR	ESP; 5	AUS		341	2nd
2018	(South Korea) Hyundai Shell Mobis WRT	(New Zealand) Hayden Paddon	MON	SWE; 5	MEX	FRA	ARG	POR; Ret	ITA; 4	FIN; 4	GER	TUR; 3	GBR; 7	ESP	AUS; 2		341	2nd
2019	(South Korea) Hyundai Shell Mobis WRT	(Belgium) Thierry Neuville	MON; 2	SWE; 3	MEX; 4	FRA; 1	ARG; 1	CHL; Ret	POR; 2	ITA; 6	FIN; 6	GER; 4	TUR; 8	GBR; 2	ESP; 1	AUS; C	380	1st
2019	(South Korea) Hyundai Shell Mobis WRT	(Norway) Andreas Mikkelsen	MON; Ret	SWE; 4	MEX; Ret	FRA	ARG; 2	CHL; 7	POR	ITA; 3	FIN; 4	GER; 6	TUR; 3	GBR; 6	ESP	AUS; C	380	1st
2019	(South Korea) Hyundai Shell Mobis WRT	(France) Sébastien Loeb	MON; 4	SWE; 7	MEX	FRA; 8	ARG	CHL; 3	POR; Ret	ITA	FIN	GER	TUR	GBR	ESP; 4	AUS; C	380	1st
2019	(South Korea) Hyundai Shell Mobis WRT	(Spain) Dani Sordo	MON	SWE	MEX; 9	FRA; 4	ARG; 6	CHL	POR; 23	ITA; 1	FIN	GER; 5	TUR; 5	GBR	ESP; 3	AUS; C	380	1st
2019	(South Korea) Hyundai Shell Mobis WRT	(Republic of Ireland) Craig Breen	MON	SWE	MEX	FRA	ARG	CHL	POR	ITA	FIN; 7	GER	TUR	GBR; 8	ESP	AUS; C	380	1st
2020	(South Korea) Hyundai Shell Mobis WRT	(Estonia) Ott Tänak	MON; Ret	SWE; 2	MEX; 2	EST; 1	TUR; 17	ITA; 6	MNZ; 2								241	1st
2020	(South Korea) Hyundai Shell Mobis WRT	(Belgium) Thierry Neuville	MON; 1	SWE; 6	MEX; 16	EST; Ret	TUR; 2	ITA; 2	MNZ; Ret								241	1st
2020	(South Korea) Hyundai Shell Mobis WRT	(France) Sébastien Loeb	MON; 6	SWE	MEX	EST	TUR; 3	ITA	MNZ								241	1st
2020	(South Korea) Hyundai Shell Mobis WRT	(Republic of Ireland) Craig Breen	MON	SWE; 7	MEX	EST; 2	TUR	ITA	MNZ								241	1st
2020	(South Korea) Hyundai Shell Mobis WRT	(Spain) Dani Sordo	MON	SWE	MEX; Ret	EST	TUR	ITA; 1	MNZ; 3								241	1st
2020	(France) Hyundai 2C Competition	(France) Pierre-Louis Loubet	MON	SWE	MEX	EST; Ret	TUR; Ret	ITA; 7									8	4th
2020	(France) Hyundai 2C Competition	(Norway) Ole Christian Veiby							MNZ; Ret								8	4th
2021	(South Korea) Hyundai Shell Mobis WRT	(Estonia) Ott Tänak	MON; Ret	ARC; 1	CRO; 4	POR; 21	ITA; 24	KEN; 3	EST; 31	BEL; 6	GRE; 2	FIN; 2	ESP; Ret	MNZ			462	2nd
2021	(South Korea) Hyundai Shell Mobis WRT	(Belgium) Thierry Neuville	MON; 3	ARC; 3	CRO; 3	POR; 36	ITA; 3	KEN; Ret	EST; 3	BEL; 1	GRE; 8	FIN; Ret	ESP; 1	MNZ; 4			462	2nd
2021	(South Korea) Hyundai Shell Mobis WRT	(Spain) Dani Sordo	MON; 5	ARC	CRO	POR; 2	ITA; 17	KEN; 12	EST	BEL	GRE; 4	FIN	ESP; 3	MNZ; 3			462	2nd
2021	(South Korea) Hyundai Shell Mobis WRT	(Republic of Ireland) Craig Breen	MON	ARC; 4	CRO; 8	POR	ITA	KEN	EST; 2	BEL; 2	GRE	FIN; 3	ESP	MNZ			462	2nd
2021	(South Korea) Hyundai Shell Mobis WRT	(Finland) Teemu Suninen	MON	ARC	CRO	POR	ITA	KEN	EST	BEL	GRE	FIN	ESP	MNZ; 6			462	2nd
2021	(France) Hyundai 2C Competition	(France) Pierre-Louis Loubet	MON; 16	ARC; 39	CRO; 29	POR; Ret	ITA; Ret	KEN; WD	EST; 7	BEL; 68	GRE; Ret	FIN		MNZ			68	4th
2021	(France) Hyundai 2C Competition	(Spain) Nil Solans											ESP; 8				68	4th
2021	(France) Hyundai 2C Competition	(Sweden) Oliver Solberg	MON	ARC; 7	CRO	POR	ITA; WD	KEN; Ret	EST	BEL	GRE	FIN	ESP; 7	MNZ; 5			68	4th

== See also ==
- World Rally Car
  - Citroën DS3 WRC
  - Citroën C3 WRC
  - Ford Fiesta WRC
  - Ford Fiesta RS WRC
  - Hyundai i20 WRC
  - Mini John Cooper Works WRC
  - Toyota Yaris WRC
  - Volkswagen Polo R WRC
