= Takamoto Katsuta =

Japanese rally driver (born 1993)

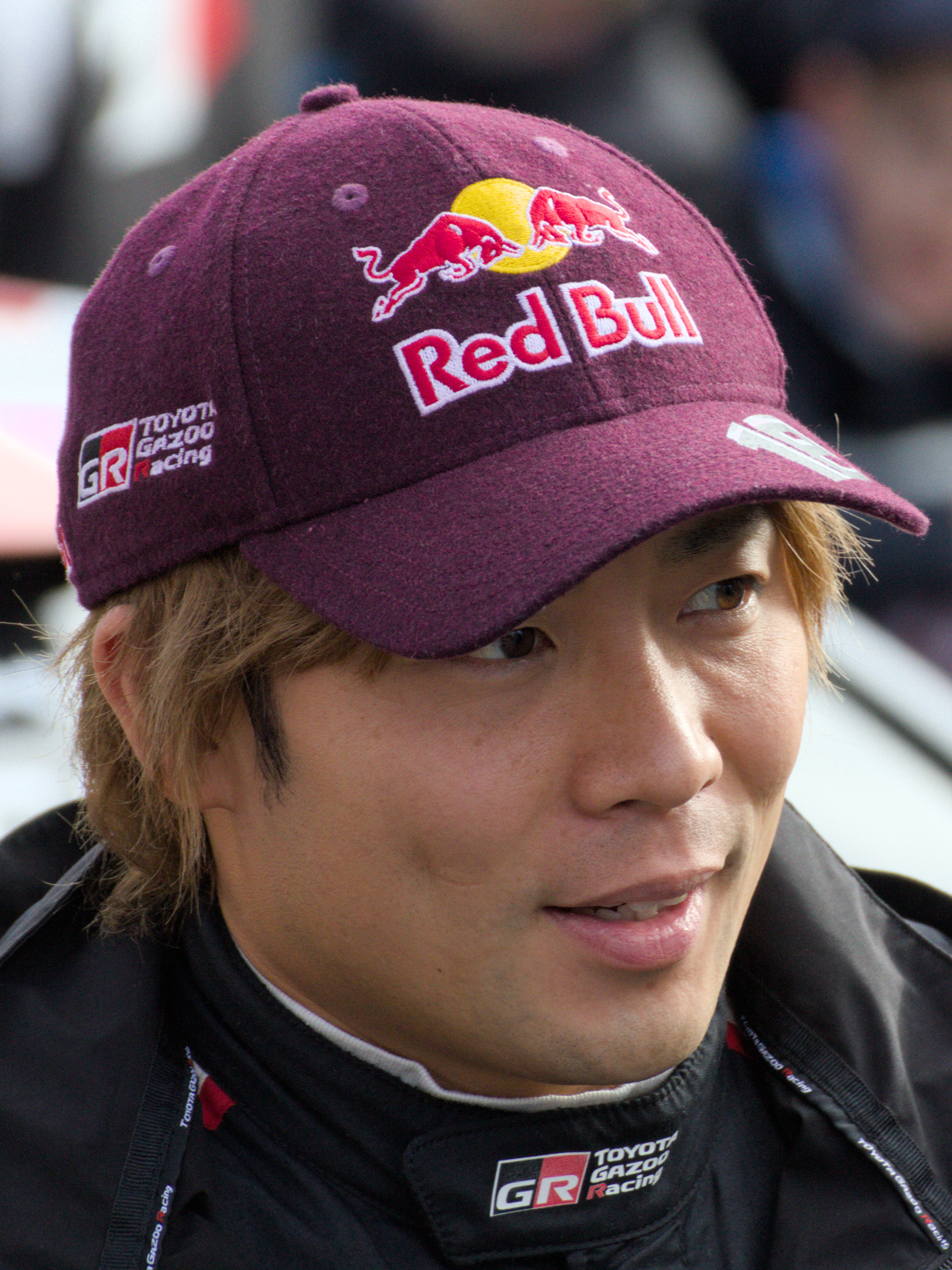
- Katsuta at the 2023 Central European Rally

Personal information
- Nationality: (Japan) Japanese
- Born: 17 March 1993 (age 33); Nagakute, Aichi, Japan

World Rally Championship record
- Years active: 2016–present
- Co-driver: (United Kingdom) Daniel Barritt (Finland) Marko Salminen (United Kingdom) Keaton Williams (Republic of Ireland) Aaron Johnston (Republic of Ireland) James Fulton
- Teams: Toyota Gazoo Racing WRT
- Rallies: 91
- Championships: 0
- Rally wins: 2
- Podiums: 10
- Stage wins: 55
- Total points: 553
- First rally: 2016 Rally Finland
- First win: 2026 Safari Rally
- Last win: 2026 Croatia Rally
- Last rally: 2026 Rally Italia Sardegna

Takamoto "Taka" Katsuta (勝田貴元, Katsuta Takamoto, born 17 March 1993) is a Japanese rally driver who currently competes in the World Rally Championship for Toyota Gazoo Racing WRT with co-driver Aaron Johnston. Katsuta rose to prominence after taking a surprise victory in the WRC-2 class at the 2018 Rally Sweden. He achieved his first World Rally Championship podium in the 2021 Safari Rally, finishing in second place. He scored his first World Rally Championship rally win in the 2026 Safari Rally.

== Early career ==
Born and raised in Nagakute, Katsuta began karting at the age of 12. Following intermediate success in this category, he began racing in the Formula Challenge Japan series in 2010, and eventually claimed the championship title over Ryō Hirakawa in 2011, aged 18.

=== 2012–2014: Years in Formula 3 ===
Seeing the successes Katsuta had in Formula Challenge Japan, the TOM'S team hired him to be one of their drivers for the Japanese Formula 3 Championship in 2012, racing in the National class. He finished third in this category overall, and was eventually promoted to full championship driver for 2013. Katsuta experienced great success in 2013, winning two races and finishing second in the overall championship, beating drivers from the likes of Katsumasa Chiyo and future member of the McLaren Young Driver Programme, Nobuharu Matsushita. The following season, 2014, would be Katsuta's last in Formula 3. He ended up under-performing, finishing fourth in the standings with another two victories.

=== Taking an interest in rallying ===
During his final year of Japanese Formula 3, Katsuta began rallying at the local level. He began with a Toyota GT86 in the JN-5 class of the Japan Rally Championship (a series his father, Norihiko, has won eight times). In his second event, the Rally Highland Masters, Katsuta won his class, finishing tenth overall. His eventual goal was to be picked up by Toyota's development driver program. His performances in Japan attracted the attention of four-time World Rally Champion and future Toyota Gazoo Racing WRT team boss Tommi Mäkinen, who signed him onto Toyota's program alongside Hiroki Arai.

== Rallying career ==
=== 2015–2016: Early years with Mäkinen ===
At the start of his campaign with Mäkinen and Toyota, Katsuta would participate in selected rallies while practicing full-time in Finland, under Mäkinen's supervision. Katsuta's first rallies with Tommi Mäkinen Racing were in local Finnish and Latvian events, driving a Subaru Impreza WRX. Beginning in 2016, Katsuta would be rallying with a very experienced co-driver, Daniel Barritt. Katsuta experienced intermediate success in local Finnish rallies, before being supplied with a Ford Fiesta R5 for the Rally Estonia, his first major long-distance rally in FIA-homologated four-wheel drive machinery. This was also his first start in the European Rally Championship. He failed to finish the event after crashing in the second leg. Despite this, Mäkinen promoted Katsuta and Hiroki Arai to their first World Rally Championship start at Finland, rallying in the WRC-2 Class. Katsuta would finish 12th in class, sixteen minutes behind the class winner.

=== 2017: Full-time WRC program ===
Beginning in 2017, Katsuta would be participating in a full-season World Rally Championship program in the WRC-2 category, alongside Hiroki Arai. He would also be rallying in local rallies outside of Finland. He partnered Marko Salminen for this season. Successes for the two drivers were few and far between, but Katsuta would make a name for himself upon taking a class podium at the Rally Italia Sardegna.

=== 2018: Victory and increased support from Toyota ===
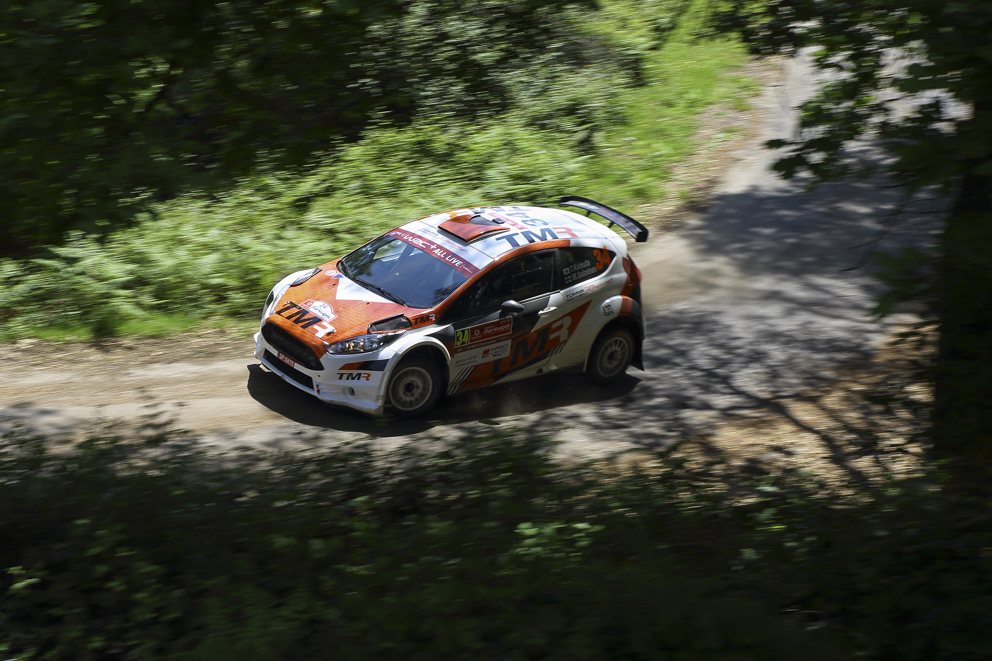
Katsuta driving a Ford Fiesta R5 at 2018 Rally de Portugal.

After his breakout onto the international scene in 2017, Katsuta would begin to enjoy more successes in 2018. He began with a third-place overall finish at the Arctic Lapland Rally, one of the biggest local rallies in Finland. Then at the Rally Sweden, after winning 10 of the 19 special stages, Katsuta won the World Rally Championship-2 class, finishing 11th overall. He won by just 4.5 seconds from Škoda factory driver and then-reigning WRC-2 champion Pontus Tidemand. After this surprise success, Katsuta and team-mate Hiroki Arai continued to rally in the European WRC events, albeit without reaching the level of success achieved at Sweden.

=== 2019: World Rally Car debut ===
Towards the end of the 2018 season, Toyota announced their intentions to eventually run Katsuta in a World Rally Car potentially by 2020. He spent 2019 competing in the WRC-2 class with Tommi Mäkinen Racing. After two seasons with Elfyn Evans, Daniel Barritt returned to be Katsuta's co-driver. Katsuta's first outing with a Toyota Yaris WRC was at the SM-Itäralli, a round of the Finnish championship, in which he would impress with a victory. Katsuta managed to win WRC-2 in Chile, but he also did not finish three rallies in his campaign and eventually finished the season in eighth. His first WRC outing with the Yaris WRC was at Rallye Deutschland, where he enjoyed a trouble-free drive to finish tenth. He got another top class chance in Catalunya, but suffered a transmission problem on Saturday, which resulted in over 50 minutes loss in stage times and penalty for late start.

=== 2020: Part-time WRC campaign ===
In 2020, Katsuta stepped up to WRC to contest all European rounds of the season. He started the season with ninth in Monte Carlo and seventh in Sweden. He then showed promising pace in both Estonia and Sardegna, but crashed out on both occasions. He also crashed on the first stage of Rally Monza, but later returned and won the Power Stage, effectively taking his first WRC stage win. Katsuta finished the season in 13th, with 13 points to his name.

=== 2021: First full season in WRC ===
Katsuta stepped up to a full-time campaign with Toyota in 2021. He finished 6th on the first three events in Monte Carlo, Arctic and Croatia and then fourth in both Portugal and Sardegna. The highlight of his season was the Safari Rally, where he avoided all the drama and finished second overall, only behind teammate Sébastien Ogier, leading a WRC rally for the first time on stages 14 and 15 following Thierry Neuville’s retirement. He retired early in Estonia after his co-driver Barritt suffered a back injury on stage 4. Keaton Williams replaced Barritt from Ypres onwards, but withdrew from Acropolis for family reasons, with Oliver Solberg’s co-driver Aaron Johnston becoming Katsuta’s new full-time co-driver from Finland on. Katsuta crashed in Belgium, Finland and Catalunya, but returned to the points with seventh in the season finale in Monza. He placed seventh overall with 78 points.

== Racing record ==
=== Circuit racing career summary ===
Season	Series	Team	Races	Wins	Poles	F/Laps	Podiums	Points	Position
2010	Formula Challenge Japan	Luck	11	0	0	0	1	8	8th
2011	Formula Challenge Japan	LUCK FTRS	13	5	0	5	9	78	1st
2012	Japanese Formula 3 Championship	Petronas Team TOM'S	15	0	0	0	0	3	9th
2013	Japanese Formula 3 Championship	Petronas Team TOM'S	14	2	1	2	10	80	2nd
2014	Japanese Formula 3 Championship	Petronas Team TOM'S	15	2	1	3	10	80	4th

=== WRC victories ===
#	Event	Season	Co-driver	Car
1	(Kenya) 74th Safari Rally	2026	(Republic of Ireland) Aaron Johnston	Toyota GR Yaris Rally1
2	50th Croatia Rally	2026	(Republic of Ireland) Aaron Johnston	Toyota GR Yaris Rally1

=== Complete World Rally Championship Results ===
Year	Entrant	Car	1	2	3	4	5	6	7	8	9	10	11	12	13	14	Pos.	Points
2016	Tommi Mäkinen Racing	Ford Fiesta R5	MON	SWE	MEX	ARG	POR	ITA	POL	FIN; 27	GER	CHN; C	FRA	ESP	GBR	AUS	NC	0
2017	Tommi Mäkinen Racing	Ford Fiesta R5	MON	SWE; 22	MEX	FRA	ARG	POR; 36	ITA; 14	POL	FIN; Ret	GER	ESP; 51	GBR	AUS		NC	0
2018	Tommi Mäkinen Racing	Ford Fiesta R5	MON	SWE; 11	MEX	FRA; 35	ARG	POR; 26	ITA; Ret	FIN; Ret	GER	TUR	GBR	ESP; 24	AUS		NC	0
2019	Tommi Mäkinen Racing	Ford Fiesta R5	MON; 13	SWE; Ret	MEX	FRA; 14	ARG; 16	CHL; 14	POR; 21	ITA; Ret							25th	1
2019	Tommi Mäkinen Racing	Ford Fiesta R5 Mk. II									FIN; Ret		TUR	GBR; 14		AUS; C	25th	1
2019	Tommi Mäkinen Racing	Toyota Yaris WRC										GER; 10			ESP; 39		25th	1
2020	Toyota Gazoo Racing WRT	Toyota Yaris WRC	MON; 7	SWE; 9	MEX	EST; Ret	TUR	ITA; Ret	MNZ; 20								13th	13
2021	Toyota Gazoo Racing WRT	Toyota Yaris WRC	MON; 6	ARC; 6	CRO; 6	POR; 4	ITA; 4	KEN; 2	EST; Ret	BEL; Ret	GRE; WD	FIN; 37	ESP; 40	MNZ; 7			7th	78
2022	Toyota Gazoo Racing WRT NG	Toyota GR Yaris Rally1	MON; 8	SWE; 4	CRO; 6	POR; 4	ITA; 6	KEN; 3	EST; 5	FIN; 6	BEL; 5	GRE; 6	NZL; Ret	ESP; 7	JPN; 3		5th	122
2023	Toyota Gazoo Racing WRT	Toyota GR Yaris Rally1	MON; 6	SWE; Ret	MEX; 23	CRO; 6	POR; 33	ITA; 40	KEN; 4	EST; 7	FIN; 3	GRE; 6	CHL; 5	EUR; 5	JPN; 5		7th	101
2024	Toyota Gazoo Racing WRT	Toyota GR Yaris Rally1	MON; 7	SWE; 45	KEN; 2	CRO; 5	POR; 29	ITA; 35	POL; 8	LAT; 6	FIN; 41	GRE; 30	CHL; WD	EUR; 4	JPN; 4		6th	116
2025	Toyota Gazoo Racing WRT	Toyota GR Yaris Rally1	MON; Ret	SWE; 2	KEN; Ret	ESP; 4	POR; 5	ITA; 5	GRE; 30	EST; Ret	FIN; 2	PAR; 16	CHL; 7	EUR; 4	JPN; Ret	SAU; 5	6th	122
2026	Toyota Gazoo Racing WRT	Toyota GR Yaris Rally1	MON; 7	SWE; 2	KEN; 1	CRO; 1	ESP; 4	POR; 5	JPN; 4	GRE; 3	EST; 10	FIN; 6	PAR; Ret	CHL; 36	ITA; 6		6th	175

* Season still in progress.

=== Complete World Rally Championship-2 Results ===
Year	Entrant	Car	1	2	3	4	5	6	7	8	9	10	11	12	13	14	Pos.	Points
2016	Tommi Mäkinen Racing	Ford Fiesta R5	MON	SWE	MEX	ARG	POR	ITA	POL	FIN; 12	GER	CHN; C	FRA	ESP	GBR	AUS	NC	0
2017	Tommi Mäkinen Racing	Ford Fiesta R5	MON	SWE; 9	MEX	FRA	ARG	POR; 14	ITA; 3	POL	FIN; Ret	GER	ESP; 14	GBR	AUS		21st	17
2018	Tommi Mäkinen Racing	Ford Fiesta R5	MON	SWE; 1	MEX	FRA; 8	ARG	POR; 13	ITA; Ret	FIN; Ret	GER	TUR	GBR	ESP; 12	AUS		14th	29
2019	Tommi Mäkinen Racing	Ford Fiesta R5	MON	SWE; Ret	MEX	FRA; 4	ARG; 5	CHL; 1	POR; 13	ITA; Ret							8th	47
2019	Tommi Mäkinen Racing	Ford Fiesta R5 Mk. II									FIN; Ret	GER	TUR	GBR	ESP	AUS; C	8th	47
