= Sebastian Marshall =

British rally co-driver (born 1988)

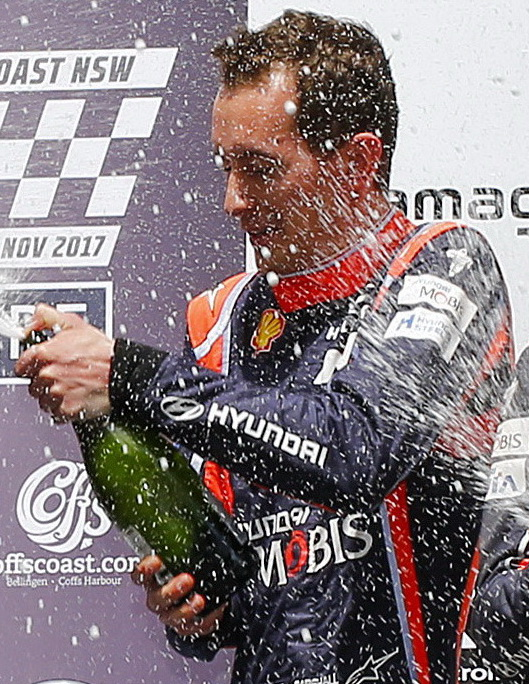
- Sebastian Marshall in 2017

Personal information
- Nationality: (United Kingdom) British
- Born: 29 May 1988 (age 38); Royal Tunbridge Wells, Kent, England

World Rally Championship record
- Years active: 2008, 2010–2019, 2021
- Driver: (United Kingdom) Richard Moore (United Kingdom) Harry Hunt (Australia) Molly Taylor (United Kingdom) Elfyn Evans (Netherlands) Kevin Abbring (New Zealand) Hayden Paddon (United Kingdom) Kris Meeke (Sweden) Oliver Solberg
- Teams: Hyundai Motorsport; Toyota Gazoo Racing WRT
- Rallies: 64
- Championships: 0
- Rally wins: 0
- Podiums: 5
- Stage wins: 34
- First rally: 2008 Rallye Deutschland
- Last rally: 2021 Rally Finland

Sebastian Marshall (born 29 May 1988) is a British rally co-driver.

== Rally career ==
Marshall began his rally career in 2005, co-driving for several drivers. In the 2008 Rallye Deutschland, he made his WRC debut, where he partnered Richard Moore in a Ford Fiesta ST.

In January 2015, it was announced Marshall would be co-driving for Kevin Abbring for Hyundai Motorsport in the World Rally Championship. While their main focus would be the development of the new Hyundai i20 WRC, Abbring and Marshall were also entered on selected WRC events later in the year.

In the 2017 Rally de Portugal, Marshal; replaced Hayden Paddon's then veteran co-driver John Kennard, who was retired from professional career in the previous round. Marshall scored his first podium in Poland, and later in Australia, the crew achieved their second podium finish of the season.

In 2018, the crew was confirmed by the South Korean team to drive the third Hyundai i20 Coupe WRC on some selected rallies.

On 4 December 2018, Marshall was confirmed by Toyota for co-driving for Kris Meeke in 2019.

== Results ==
=== WRC results ===
Year	Entrant	Car	1	2	3	4	5	6	7	8	9	10	11	12	13	14	15	WDC	Points
2008	Richard Moore	Ford Fiesta ST	MON	SWE	MEX	ARG	JOR	ITA	GRE	TUR	FIN	GER; 53	NZL	ESP	FRA	JPN	GBR	NC	0
2010	Harry Hunt Motorsport	Ford Fiesta R2	SWE; 43	MEX	JOR	TUR; 18	NZL	POR; 51	BUL; Ret	FIN; Ret	GER; Ret	JPN	FRA; 39	ESP; 27	GBR; 34			NC	0
2011	Molly Taylor	Ford Fiesta R2	SWE	MEX	POR	JOR	ITA	ARG	GRE	FIN; 65	GER; Ret	AUS	FRA; 34	ESP	GBR; 35			NC	0
2012	Molly Taylor	Citroën DS3 R3T	MON	SWE	MEX	POR	ARG	GRE	NZL	FIN; Ret	GER	GBR; 20	FRA	ITA				NC	0
2012	Elfyn Evans	Ford Fiesta R2														ESP; Ret		NC	0
2013	Molly Taylor	Citroën DS3 R3T	MON	SWE	MEX	POR	ARG	GRE	ITA	FIN	GER	AUS	FRA	ESP	GBR; 23			NC	0
2014	Molly Taylor	Citroën DS3 R3T	MON	SWE	MEX	POR	ARG	ITA	POL; 45	FIN; 35	GER	AUS		ESP	GBR; 32			NC	0
2014	Peugeot Rally Academy	Peugeot 208 T16											FRA; 14					NC	0
2015	Hyundai Motorsport N	Hyundai i20 WRC	MON	SWE; 11	MEX	ARG	POR	ITA	POL; 15	FIN	GER; 11	AUS	FRA; Ret	ESP	GBR			NC	0
2016	Hyundai Motorsport N	Hyundai i20 WRC	MON	SWE	MEX	ARG	POR; Ret	ITA; 15	POL	FIN; 9	GER	CHN; C		ESP; 7		AUS		16th	10
2016	Hyundai Motorsport N	Hyundai i20 R5											FRA; Ret		GBR; Ret			16th	10
2017	Hyundai Motorsport	Hyundai i20 Coupe WRC	MON	SWE	MEX	FRA	ARG	POR; Ret	ITA; Ret	POL; 2	FIN; Ret	GER; 8	ESP	GBR; 8	AUS; 3			12th	41
2018	Hyundai Shell Mobis WRT	Hyundai i20 Coupe WRC	MON	SWE; 5	MEX	FRA	ARG	POR; Ret	ITA; 4	FIN; 4	GER	TUR; 3	GBR; 7	ESP	AUS; 2			7th	73
2019	Toyota Gazoo Racing WRT	Toyota Yaris WRC	MON; 6	SWE; 6	MEX; 5	FRA; 9	ARG; 4	CHL; 10	POR; Ret	ITA; 8	FIN; Ret	GER; 2	TUR; 7	GBR; 4	ESP; 29	AUS; C		6th	98
2021	Hyundai 2C Competition	Hyundai i20 Coupe WRC	MON	ARC; 7	CRO	POR	ITA	KEN										21st	6
2021	M-Sport Poland	Ford Fiesta Rally3							EST; Ret	BEL	GRE; Ret	FIN; 20	ESP	MNZ				21st	6

* Season still in progress.
