= Anders Jæger =

Norwegian rally co-driver (born 1989)

Anders Jæger-Amland
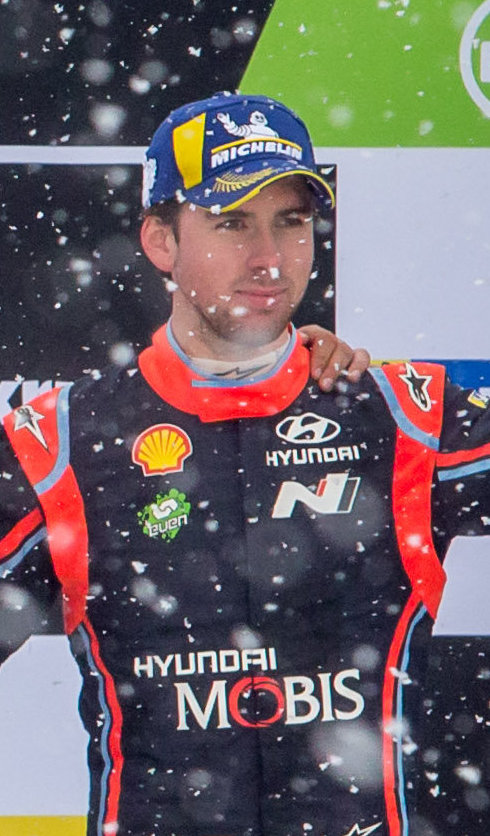
- Anders Jæger-Amland in 2018

Personal information
- Nationality: (Norway) Norwegian
- Born: 29 July 1989 (age 37); Oslo, Norway

World Rally Championship record
- Years active: 2014–2020
- Driver: (Norway) Ole Christian Veiby (Norway) Andreas Mikkelsen
- Teams: Volkswagen, Škoda, Citroën, Hyundai
- Rallies: 55
- Championships: 0
- Rally wins: 2
- Podiums: 11
- Stage wins: 68
- First rally: 2014 Rally Catalunya
- First win: 2016 Rally Poland
- Last win: 2016 Rally Australia
- Last rally: 2020 Rally Monza

Anders Jæger-Amland (né Jæger-Synnevaag; born 29 July 1989) is a rallying co-driver from Norway. He has been the co-driver of Andreas Mikkelsen since 2016.

== Career ==
In 2015, Jæger-Amland competed in WRC-3 and JWRC, with Ole Christian Veiby. In 2016, he became Mikkelsen's new co-driver at Volkswagen and they won two rallies in their first season together, finishing third in the championship.

They moved to Škoda Motorsport in the WRC-2 for their 2017 campaign, as Volkswagen works team departed the WRC in 2017. Mikkelsen and Jæger-Amland joined Citroën for the 2017 Rally d'Italia replacing Stéphane Lefebvre and Gabin Moreau. They would also make appearances for the French team in Poland and Germany. Jæger-Amland joined Hyundai Motorsport with Mikkelsen in 2017, signing a deal which would keep them at the team until the end of 2019.

== WRC victories ==
#	Event	Season	Driver	Car
1	73rd Rally Poland	2016	(Norway) Andreas Mikkelsen	Volkswagen Polo R WRC
2	25th Rally Australia	2016	(Norway) Andreas Mikkelsen	Volkswagen Polo R WRC

== Career results ==
=== Complete WRC results ===
Year	Entrant	Car	1	2	3	4	5	6	7	8	9	10	11	12	13	14	Pos.	Points
2014	Ole Christian Veiby	Citroën DS3 R3T	MON	SWE	MEX	POR	ARG	ITA	POL	FIN	GER	AUS	FRA	ESP; Ret	GBR; 34		NC	0
2015	Printsport	Citroën DS3 R3T	MON; 25	SWE; 21	MEX	ARG	POR; 35	ITA	POL	FIN; 22	GER	AUS	FRA; 95	ESP; 48	GBR; 23		NC	0
2016	Volkswagen Motorsport II	Volkswagen Polo R WRC	MON; 2	SWE; 4	MEX; Ret	ARG; 3	POR; 2	ITA; 13	POL; 1	FIN; 7	GER; 4	CHN; C	FRA; 3	ESP; Ret	GBR; 12	AUS; 1	3rd	154
2017	Škoda Motorsport	Škoda Fabia R5	MON; 7	SWE	MEX	FRA; 7	ARG	POR; Ret									12th	54
2017	Citroën Total Abu Dhabi WRT	Citroën C3 WRC							ITA; 8	POL; 9	FIN	GER; 2					12th	54
2017	Hyundai Motorsport	Hyundai i20 Coupe WRC											ESP; 18	GBR; 4	AUS; 11		12th	54
2018	Hyundai Shell Mobis WRT	Hyundai i20 Coupe WRC	MON; 13	SWE; 3	MEX; 4	FRA; 7	ARG; 5	POR; 16	ITA; 18	FIN; 10	GER; 6	TUR; 5	GBR; 6	ESP; 10	AUS; 11		6th	84
2019	Hyundai Shell Mobis WRT	Hyundai i20 Coupe WRC	MON; Ret	SWE; 4	MEX; Ret	FRA	ARG; 2	CHL; 7	POR	ITA; 3	FIN; 4	GER; 6	TUR; 3	GBR; 6	ESP	AUS; C	4th	102
2020	Andreas Mikkelsen	Škoda Fabia R5 Evo	MON	SWE	MEX	EST	TUR	ITA	MNZ; 6								15th	8
