= 2019 Rally Chile =

1st edition of Rally Chile

2019 Rally Chile: 1. Copec Rally Chile
Round 6 of 14 in the 2019 World Rally Championship
← Previous event	Next event →
- Host country: Chile
- Rally base: Concepción, Biobío
- Dates run: 9 – 12 May 2019
- Start location: El Pinar, Concepción Province
- Finish location: Villa Verde, Concepción Province
- Stages: 16 (304.81 km; 189.40 miles)
- Stage surface: Gravel
- Transport distance: 940.87 km (584.63 miles)
- Overall distance: 1,245.68 km (774.03 miles)

Statistics
- Crews registered: 63
- Crews: 55 at start, 35 at finish

Overall results
- Overall winner: (Estonia) Ott Tänak (Estonia) Martin Järveoja (Japan) Toyota Gazoo Racing WRT; 3:15:53.8
- Power Stage winner: (Estonia) Ott Tänak (Estonia) Martin Järveoja (Japan) Toyota Gazoo Racing WRT

Support category results
- WRC-2 winner: (Japan) Takamoto Katsuta (United Kingdom) Daniel Barritt (Japan) Takamoto Katsuta; 3:29:26.7

The 2019 Rally Chile (also known as the Copec Rally Chile 2019) was a motor racing event for rally cars that was held over four days between 9 and 12 May 2019. It marked the first running of Rally Chile, and was the sixth round of the 2019 World Rally Championship, World Rally Championship-2 and the newly created WRC-2 Pro class. The 2019 event was based in Talcahuano of Concepción Province in Bío Bío Region and consists of sixteen special stages totalling 304.81 km (189.40 mi) competitive kilometres.

Ott Tänak and Martin Järveoja won the first edition of Rally Chile. Their team, Toyota Gazoo Racing WRT, were the manufacturers' winners. The Škoda Motorsport crew of Kalle Rovanperä and Jonne Halttunen took the victory in the WRC-2 Pro category, finishing first in the combined WRC-2 category, while Takamoto Katsuta and Daniel Barritt won the wider WRC-2 class.

== Background ==
=== Championship standings prior to the event ===
Thierry Neuville and Nicolas Gilsoul led both the drivers' and co-drivers' championships with a ten-point lead over six-time world champions Sébastien Ogier and Julien Ingrassia. Ott Tänak and Martin Järveoja were third, a further eighteen points behind. In the World Rally Championship for Manufacturers, Hyundai Shell Mobis WRT held a thirty-seven-point lead over Toyota Gazoo Racing WRT.

In the World Rally Championship-2 Pro standings, Łukasz Pieniążek and Kamil Heller held a four-point lead ahead of Gus Greensmith and Elliott Edmondson in the drivers' and co-drivers' standings respectively. Mads Østberg and Torstein Eriksen were third, eight points further back. In the manufacturers' championship, M-Sport Ford WRT led Citroën Total by seventy points, with Škoda Motorsport fourteen points further behind in third.

In the World Rally Championship-2 standings, Benito Guerra and Jaime Zapata led the drivers' and co-drivers' standings by three points respectively. Ole Christian Veiby and Jonas Andersson were second, following by Nikolay Gryazin and Yaroslav Fedorov in third.

=== Entry list ===
The following crews entered into the rally. The event was open to crews competing in the World Rally Championship, World Rally Championship-2, WRC-2 Pro and privateer entries not registered to score points in any championship. A total of sixty-three entries were received, with eleven crews entered with World Rally Cars and twenty-three entered the World Rally Championship-2. Four crews were nominated to score points in the Pro class.

No.	Driver	Co-Driver	Entrant	Car	Tyre
World Rally Car entries
1	(France) Sébastien Ogier	(France) Julien Ingrassia	(France) Citroën Total WRT	Citroën C3 WRC	MI
3	(Finland) Teemu Suninen	(Finland) Marko Salminen	(United Kingdom) M-Sport Ford WRT	Ford Fiesta WRC	MI
4	(Finland) Esapekka Lappi	(Finland) Janne Ferm	(France) Citroën Total WRT	Citroën C3 WRC	MI
5	(United Kingdom) Kris Meeke	(United Kingdom) Sebastian Marshall	(Japan) Toyota Gazoo Racing WRT	Toyota Yaris WRC	MI
8	(Estonia) Ott Tänak	(Estonia) Martin Järveoja	(Japan) Toyota Gazoo Racing WRT	Toyota Yaris WRC	MI
10	(Finland) Jari-Matti Latvala	(Finland) Miikka Anttila	(Japan) Toyota Gazoo Racing WRT	Toyota Yaris WRC	MI
11	(Belgium) Thierry Neuville	(Belgium) Nicolas Gilsoul	(South Korea) Hyundai Shell Mobis WRT	Hyundai i20 Coupe WRC	MI
19	(France) Sébastien Loeb	(Monaco) Daniel Elena	(South Korea) Hyundai Shell Mobis WRT	Hyundai i20 Coupe WRC	MI
33	(United Kingdom) Elfyn Evans	(United Kingdom) Scott Martin	(United Kingdom) M-Sport Ford WRT	Ford Fiesta WRC	MI
37	(Italy) Lorenzo Bertelli	(Italy) Simone Scattolin	(United Kingdom) M-Sport Ford WRT	Ford Fiesta WRC	MI
89	(Norway) Andreas Mikkelsen	(Norway) Anders Jæger-Amland	(South Korea) Hyundai Shell Mobis WRT	Hyundai i20 Coupe WRC	MI
World Rally Championship-2 Pro entries
21	(United Kingdom) Gus Greensmith	(United Kingdom) Elliott Edmondson	(United Kingdom) M-Sport Ford WRT	Ford Fiesta R5	MI
22	(Finland) Kalle Rovanperä	(Finland) Jonne Halttunen	(Czech Republic) Škoda Motorsport (Note: Entry run in conjunction with Toksport World Rally Team.)	Škoda Fabia R5	MI
23	(Norway) Mads Østberg	(Norway) Torstein Eriksen	(France) Citroën Total (Note: Entry run in conjunction with DG Sport.)	Citroën C3 R5	MI
24	(Bolivia) Marco Bulacia Wilkinson	(Argentina) Fabian Cretu	(Czech Republic) Škoda Motorsport (Note: Entry operated by VIALCO Racing.)	Škoda Fabia R5	MI
World Rally Championship-2 entries
41	(Mexico) Benito Guerra	(Mexico) Jaime Zapata	(Mexico) Benito Guerra (Note: Entry operated by Race Seven.)	Škoda Fabia R5	MI
42	(Chile) Alberto Heller	(Argentina) José Díaz	(Chile) Alberto Heller (Note: Entry operated by Joker Team.)	Ford Fiesta R5	MI
43	(Poland) Kajetan Kajetanowicz	(Poland) Maciej Szczepaniak	(Poland) Kajetan Kajetanowicz (Note: Entry operated by Lotos Dynamic Rally Team.)	Volkswagen Polo GTI R5	P
44	(Japan) Takamoto Katsuta	(United Kingdom) Daniel Barritt	(Japan) Takamoto Katsuta (Note: Entry operated by Tommi Mäkinen Racing.)	Ford Fiesta R5	P
45	(Chile) Pedro Heller	(Spain) Marc Martí	(Chile) Pedro Heller	Ford Fiesta R5	MI
46	(Brazil) Paulo Nobre	(Brazil) Gabriel Morales	(Brazil) Paulo Nobre (Note: Entry operated by Palmeirinha Rally.)	Škoda Fabia R5	P
47	(Chile) Emilio Fernández	(Chile) Emilio Fernández	(Chile) Joaquin Riquelme	Škoda Fabia R5	MI
48	(Chile) Benjamin Israel	(Argentina) Marcelo Der Ohannesian	(Chile) Benjamin Israel (Note: Entry operated by Monster Procircuit.)	Citroën C3 R5	MI
49	(Chile) Vicente Israel	(Argentina) Matias Ramos	(Chile) Vicente Israel	Citroën C3 R5	MI
50	(Chile) Samuel Israel	(Argentina) Nicolas Garcia	(Chile) Samuel Israel	Citroën C3 R5	MI
51	(Chile) Jorge Martínez Fontena	(Argentina) Alberto Alvarez	(Chile) Jorge Martínez Fontena	Škoda Fabia R5	MI
52	(Argentina) Alejandro Cancio	(Argentina) Santiago Garcia	(Argentina) Alejandro Cancio	Škoda Fabia R5	MI
53	(Chile) Cristóbal Vidaurre	(Argentina) Ruben Garcia	(Chile) Cristóbal Vidaurre	Škoda Fabia R5	MI
54	(Chile) Felipe Rossi	(Argentina) Luis Ernesto Allende	(Chile) Felipe Rossi	Ford Fiesta R5	MI
55	(Chile) Francisco Lopez	(Chile) Nicolas Levalle	(Chile) Francisco Lopez	Peugeot 208 T16	MI
56	(Chile) Germán Lyon	(Argentina) Ignacio Uez Ahumada	(Chile) Germán Lyon	Peugeot 208 T16	MI
57	(Peru) Eduardo Castro	(Peru) Julio Echazu	(Peru) Eduardo Castro	Citroën C3 R5	MI
58	(Argentina) Martin Scuncio	(Chile) Javiera Roman	(Argentina) Martin Scuncio	Hyundai i20 R5	MI
59	(Chile) Tomas Etcheverry	(Chile) Sebastian Vera	(Chile) Tomas Etcheverry	Hyundai i20 R5	MI

=== Route ===
Chile has never previously hosted its own WRC round, so every stage is brand new.

==== Itinerary ====
All dates and times are CLT (UTC-3).

Date	Time	No.	Stage name	Distance
9 May	11:00	—	Talcahuano [Shakedown]	6.45 km
Leg 1 — 142.38 km
10 May	8:00	SS1	El Pinar	17.11 km
10 May	9:33	SS2	El Puma 1	30.72 km
10 May	10:46	SS3	Espigado 1	22.26 km
10 May	15:14	SS4	El Puma 2	30.72 km
10 May	16:27	SS5	Espigado 2	22.26 km
10 May	18:30	SS6	Concepcion — Bicentenario	2.20 km
Leg 2 — 121.16 km
11 May	8:08	SS7	Rio Lia 1	24.90 km
11 May	9:08	SS8	Maria Las Cruces 1	23.09 km
11 May	10:20	SS9	Pelun 1	16.59 km
11 May	14:08	SS10	Rio Lia 2	24.90 km
11 May	15:08	SS11	Maria Las Cruces 2	23.09 km
11 May	16:20	SS12	Pelun 2	16.59 km
Leg 3 — 62.16 km
12 May	8:08	SS13	Bio Bio 1	14.41 km
12 May	10:31	SS14	Lircay	18.06 km
12 May	10:20	SS15	San Nicolàs	15.28 km
12 May	12:18	SS16	Bio Bio 2 [Power Stage]	14.41 km

== Report ==
=== World Rally Cars ===
The second stage of the brand new event was interrupted due to the safety reason, which affected Thierry Neuville, who was first on the road. As a result, the Belgian was awarded a notional time. In the afternoon loop, Ott Tänak stormed away and held a 22.4-second lead into Saturday.

The second leg was quite dramatic. Kris Meeke rolled his Yaris in the opening stage of the day. He managed to carry on, but valuable time has been lost, which dropped him down to tenth overall at the end of the day. One stage later, championship leader Neuville crashed violently after a right-hand blind crest, badly damaging his i20. Luckily, the Belgian and his co-driver Nicolas Gilsoul were fine, but they were unable to continue the rally. The battle for the final podium was on fire until Jari-Matti Latvala hit a rock in the final test and broke his Toyota's driveshaft, which elevated nine-time world champion Sébastien Loeb to third, just 5.1 seconds off defending world champion Sébastien Ogier, who was half a minute behind rally leader Tänak. Eventually, Tänak took the rally victory, following by Ogier, who managed to keep Loeb behind, in second.

==== Classification ====
Position		No.	Driver	Co-driver	Entrant	Car	Time	Difference	Points	
Event	Class	No.	Driver	Co-driver	Entrant	Car	Time	Difference	Event	Stage
1	1	8	Ott Tänak	Martin Järveoja	Toyota Gazoo Racing WRT	Toyota Yaris WRC	3:15:53.8	0.0	25	5
2	2	1	Sébastien Ogier	Julien Ingrassia	Citroën Total WRT	Citroën C3 WRC	3:16:16.9	+23.1	18	4
3	3	19	Sébastien Loeb	Daniel Elena	Hyundai Shell Mobis WRT	Hyundai i20 Coupe WRC	3:16:24.0	+30.2	15	2
4	4	33	Elfyn Evans	Scott Martin	M-Sport Ford WRT	Ford Fiesta WRC	3:17:30.5	+1:36.7	12	0
5	5	3	Teemu Suninen	Marko Salminen	M-Sport Ford WRT	Ford Fiesta WRC	3:19:09.4	+3:15.6	10	0
6	6	4	Esapekka Lappi	Janne Ferm	Citroën Total WRT	Citroën C3 WRC	3:19:39.2	+3:45.4	8	0
7	7	89	Andreas Mikkelsen	Anders Jæger-Amland	Hyundai Shell Mobis WRT	Hyundai i20 Coupe WRC	3:20:32.8	+4:39.0	6	0
10	8	5	Kris Meeke	Sebastian Marshall	Toyota Gazoo Racing WRT	Toyota Yaris WRC	3:24:27.2	+8:33.4	1	1
11	9	10	Jari-Matti Latvala	Miikka Anttila	Toyota Gazoo Racing WRT	Toyota Yaris WRC	3:26:53.0	+10:59.2	0	3
Retired SS8		11	Thierry Neuville	Nicolas Gilsoul	Hyundai Shell Mobis WRT	Hyundai i20 Coupe WRC	Rolled		0	0

==== Special stages ====
Date	No.	Stage name	Distance	Winners	Car	Time	Class leaders
9 May	—	Pinares [Shakedown]	6.45 km	Mikkelsen / Jæger-Amland	Hyundai i20 Coupe WRC	4:46.4	—N/a
10 May	SS1	El Pinar	17.11 km	Meeke / Marshall; Latvala / Anttila	Toyota Yaris WRC; Toyota Yaris WRC	11:35.9	Meeke / Marshall; Latvala / Anttila
10 May	SS2	El Puma 1	30.72 km	Tänak / Järveoja	Toyota Yaris WRC	21:10.4	Tänak / Järveoja
10 May	SS3	Espigado 1	22.26 km	Neuville / Gilsoul	Hyundai i20 Coupe WRC	14:23.7	Tänak / Järveoja
10 May	SS4	El Puma 2	30.72 km	Tänak / Järveoja	Toyota Yaris WRC	20:46.0	Tänak / Järveoja
10 May	SS5	Espigado 2	22.26 km	Tänak / Järveoja	Toyota Yaris WRC	14:03.4	Tänak / Järveoja
10 May	SS6	Concepcion — Bicentenario	2.20 km	Loeb / Elena	Hyundai i20 Coupe WRC	2:06.9	Tänak / Järveoja
11 May	SS7	Rio Lia 1	24.90 km	Neuville / Gilsoul	Hyundai i20 Coupe WRC	13:55.1	Tänak / Järveoja
11 May	SS8	Maria Las Cruces 1	23.09 km	Loeb / Elena	Hyundai i20 Coupe WRC	14:28.3	Tänak / Järveoja
11 May	SS9	Pelun 1	16.59 km	Tänak / Järveoja	Toyota Yaris WRC	10:09.8	Tänak / Järveoja
11 May	SS10	Rio Lia 2	24.90 km	Ogier / Ingrassia	Citroën C3 WRC	13:45.1	Tänak / Järveoja
11 May	SS11	Maria Las Cruces 2	23.09 km	Tänak / Järveoja	Toyota Yaris WRC	14:14.7	Tänak / Järveoja
11 May	SS12	Pelun 2	16.59 km	Loeb / Elena	Hyundai i20 Coupe WRC	10:00.6	Tänak / Järveoja
12 May	SS13	Bio Bio 1	14.41 km	Meeke / Marshall	Toyota Yaris WRC	8:14.5	Tänak / Järveoja
12 May	SS14	Lircay	18.06 km	Ogier / Ingrassia	Citroën C3 WRC	10:13.5	Tänak / Järveoja
12 May	SS15	San Nicolàs	15.28 km	Loeb / Elena	Hyundai i20 Coupe WRC	8:08.6	Tänak / Järveoja
12 May	SS16	Bio Bio 2 [Power Stage]	14.41 km	Tänak / Järveoja	Toyota Yaris WRC	7:57.3	Tänak / Järveoja

==== Championship standings ====
Pos.	Drivers' championships			Co-drivers' championships			Manufacturers' championships		
Pos.	Move	Driver	Points	Move	Co-driver	Points	Move	Manufacturer	Points
1	1	Sébastien Ogier	122	1	Julien Ingrassia	122		Hyundai Shell Mobis WRT	178
2	1	Ott Tänak	112	1	Martin Järveoja	112		Toyota Gazoo Racing WRT	149
3	2	Thierry Neuville	110	2	Nicolas Gilsoul	110		Citroën Total WRT	143
4		Kris Meeke	56		Sebastian Marshall	56		M-Sport Ford WRT	100
5		Elfyn Evans	55		Scott Martin	55			

=== World Rally Championship-2 Pro ===
Kalle Rovanperä led in the Pro category with a slender 2.4-second advantage after an intense battle with Mads Østberg. The eighteen-year-old Finn extended his lead over Østberg as the Norwegian lost 30 seconds when fluid leaked out of the rear brakes of his C3 R5. Eventually, Rovanperä successfully took his first Pro victory of the season.

==== Special stages ====
Results in bold denote first in the RC2 class, the class which both the WRC-2 Pro and WRC-2 championships run to.

Date	No.	Stage name	Distance	Winners	Car	Time	Class leaders
9 May	—	Talcahuano [Shakedown]	6.45 km	Rovanperä / Halttunen	Škoda Fabia R5	4:59.6	—N/a
10 May	SS1	El Pinar	17.11 km	**Østberg / Eriksen**	Citroën C3 R5	12:03.0	Østberg / Eriksen
10 May	SS2	El Puma 1	30.72 km	**Østberg / Eriksen**	Citroën C3 R5	22:11.7	Østberg / Eriksen
10 May	SS3	Espigado 1	22.26 km	**Østberg / Eriksen**	Citroën C3 R5	15:08.3	Østberg / Eriksen
10 May	SS4	El Puma 2	30.72 km	**Rovanperä / Halttunen**	Škoda Fabia R5	21:32.5	Rovanperä / Halttunen
10 May	SS5	Espigado 2	22.26 km	**Rovanperä / Halttunen**	Škoda Fabia R5	14:47.5	Rovanperä / Halttunen
10 May	SS6	Concepcion — Bicentenario	2.20 km	**Østberg / Eriksen**	Citroën C3 R5	2:12.8	Rovanperä / Halttunen
11 May	SS7	Rio Lia 1	24.90 km	**Rovanperä / Halttunen**	Škoda Fabia R5	14:24.7	Rovanperä / Halttunen
11 May	SS8	Maria Las Cruces 1	23.09 km	Stage interrupted (Note: The stage was interrupted following Thierry Neuville and Nicolas Gilsoul's accident. As a result, WRC-2 Pro crews were given 15:00.0 to their times; WRC-2 crews were given 15:15.0; private crews received 16:15.0.)			
11 May	SS9	Pelun 1	16.59 km	**Østberg / Eriksen**	Citroën C3 R5	10:36.6	Rovanperä / Halttunen
11 May	SS10	Rio Lia 2	24.90 km	**Østberg / Eriksen**	Citroën C3 R5	14:05.1	Rovanperä / Halttunen
11 May	SS11	Maria Las Cruces 2	23.09 km	**Østberg / Eriksen**	Citroën C3 R5	14:46.1	Rovanperä / Halttunen
11 May	SS12	Pelun 2	16.59 km	**Rovanperä / Halttunen**	Škoda Fabia R5	10:32.5	Rovanperä / Halttunen
12 May	SS13	Bio Bio 1	14.41 km	**Østberg / Eriksen**	Citroën C3 R5	8:37.2	Rovanperä / Halttunen
12 May	SS14	Lircay	18.06 km	**Østberg / Eriksen**	Citroën C3 R5	10:39.5	Rovanperä / Halttunen
12 May	SS15	San Nicolàs	15.28 km	**Østberg / Eriksen**	Citroën C3 R5	8:30.9	Rovanperä / Halttunen
12 May	SS16	Bio Bio 2	14.41 km	**Østberg / Eriksen**	Citroën C3 R5	8:21.4	Rovanperä / Halttunen

==== Classification ====
Position		No.	Driver	Co-driver	Entrant	Car	Time	Difference	Points	
Event	Class	No.	Driver	Co-driver	Entrant	Car	Time	Difference	Class	Event
8	1	22	Kalle Rovanperä	Jonne Halttunen	Škoda Motorsport	Škoda Fabia R5	3:23:46.3	0.0	**25**	**4**
9	2	23	Mads Østberg	Torstein Eriksen	Citroën Total	Citroën C3 R5	3:24:09.9	+23.6	**18**	**2**
12	3	21	Gus Greensmith	Elliott Edmondson	M-Sport Ford WRT	Ford Fiesta R5	3:27:35.3	+3:49.0	**15**	**0**
15	4	24	Marco Bulacia Wilkinson	Fabian Cretu	Škoda Motorsport	Škoda Fabia R5	3:29:28.6	+5:42.3	**12**	**0**

==== Championship standings ====
Pos.	Drivers' championships			Co-drivers' championships			Manufacturers' championships		
Pos.	Move	Driver	Points	Move	Co-driver	Points	Move	Manufacturer	Points
1	1	Gus Greensmith	73	1	Elliott Edmondson	73		M-Sport Ford WRT	135
2	1	Mads Østberg	68	1	Torstein Eriksen	68	1	Škoda Motorsport	73
3	2	Łukasz Pieniążek	62	2	Kamil Heller	62	1	Citroën Total	68
4	1	Kalle Rovanperä	61	1	Jonne Halttunen	61			
5		Marco Bulacia Wilkinson	12		Fabian Cretu	12			

=== World Rally Championship-2 ===
Three-time European Rally Champion Kajetan Kajetanowicz was initially entered for the event, but due to the mechanical issues in Rally Argentina, he and his team withdrew from Chile.

Local hero Alberto Heller was comfortable in the lead, but his brother Pedro Heller had to retire from the day as he rolled his Fiesta in the opening stage. However, Alberto was surpassed by Takamoto Katsuta in final stage of the second leg. Worse still, the Chilean rolled his Ford Fiesta into retirement in the second to last stage. Eventually, Katsuta brought car home to take his first victory of the season.

==== Classification ====
Position		No.	Driver	Co-driver	Entrant	Car	Time	Difference	Points	
Event	Class	No.	Driver	Co-driver	Entrant	Car	Time	Difference	Class	Event
14	1	44	Takamoto Katsuta	Daniel Barritt	Takamoto Katsuta	Ford Fiesta R5	3:29:26.7	0.0	25	0
16	2	41	Benito Guerra	Jaime Zapata	Benito Guerra	Škoda Fabia R5	3:32:32.8	+3:06.1	18	0
17	3	52	Alejandro Cancio	Santiago Garcia	Alejandro Cancio	Škoda Fabia R5	3:34:33.9	+5:07.2	15	0
18	4	53	Cristóbal Vidaurre	Ruben Garcia	Cristóbal Vidaurre	Škoda Fabia R5	3:34:54.0	+5:27.3	12	0
19	5	50	Samuel Israel	Nicolas Garcia	Samuel Israel	Citroën C3 R5	3:36:04.4	+6:37.7	10	0
20	6	49	Vicente Israel	Matias Ramos	Vicente Israel	Citroën C3 R5	3:37:17.9	+7:51.2	8	0
21	7	46	Paulo Nobre	Gabriel Morales	Paulo Nobre	Škoda Fabia R5	3:44:57.2	+15:30.3	6	0
22	8	57	Eduardo Castro	Julio Echazu	Eduardo Castro	Citroën C3 R5	3:48:01.7	+18:35.0	4	0
23	9	55	Francisco Lopez	Nicolas Levalle	Francisco Lopez	Peugeot 208 T16	3:56:42.0	+27:15.3	2	0
28	10	45	Pedro Heller	Marc Martí	Pedro Heller	Ford Fiesta R5	4:15:21.7	+45:55.0	1	0
30	11	51	Jorge Martínez Fontena	Alberto Alvarez	Jorge Martínez Fontena	Škoda Fabia R5	4:19:58.3	+50:31.6	0	0
34	12	54	Felipe Rossi	Luis Ernesto Allende	Felipe Rossi	Ford Fiesta R5	4:31:24.8	+1:01:58.1	0	0
Retired SS15		58	Martin Scuncio	Javiera Roman	Martin Scuncio	Hyundai i20 R5	Mechanical		0	0
Retired SS14		59	Tomas Etcheverry	Sebastian Vera	Tomas Etcheverry	Hyundai i20 R5	Mechanical		0	0
Retired SS13		56	Germán Lyon	Ignacio Uez Ahumada	Germán Lyon	Peugeot 208 T16	Mechanical		0	0
Retired SS2		47	Emilio Fernández	Joaquin Riquelme	Emilio Fernández	Škoda Fabia R5	Accident		0	0
Retired SS2		48	Benjamin Israel	Marcelo Der Ohannesian	Benjamin Israel	Citroën C3 R5	Mechanical		0	0
Did not start		43	Kajetan Kajetanowicz	Maciej Szczepaniak	Kajetan Kajetanowicz	Volkswagen Polo GTI R5	Withdrawn		0	0

==== Special stages ====
Results in bold denote first in the RC2 class, the class which both the WRC-2 Pro and WRC-2 championships run to.

Date	No.	Stage name	Distance	Winners	Car	Time	Class leaders
9 May	—	Talcahuano [Shakedown]	6.45 km	**Fontena / Alvarez**	Škoda Fabia R5	4:59.3	—N/a
10 May	SS1	El Pinar	17.11 km	Katsuta / Barritt	Ford Fiesta R5	12:30.4	Katsuta / Barritt
10 May	SS2	El Puma 1	30.72 km	A. Heller / Díaz	Ford Fiesta R5	22:40.3	A. Heller / Díaz
10 May	SS3	Espigado 1	22.26 km	Katsuta / Barritt	Ford Fiesta R5	15:46.0	A. Heller / Díaz
10 May	SS4	El Puma 2	30.72 km	A. Heller / Díaz	Ford Fiesta R5	22:23.9	A. Heller / Díaz
10 May	SS5	Espigado 2	22.26 km	A. Heller / Díaz	Ford Fiesta R5	15:24.4	A. Heller / Díaz
10 May	SS6	Concepcion — Bicentenario	2.20 km	Katsuta / Barritt	Ford Fiesta R5	2:15.5	A. Heller / Díaz
11 May	SS7	Rio Lia 1	24.90 km	Katsuta / Barritt	Ford Fiesta R5	14:34.3	A. Heller / Díaz
11 May	SS8	Maria Las Cruces 1	23.09 km	Stage interrupted			
11 May	SS9	Pelun 1	16.59 km	Martínez Fontena / Alvarez	Škoda Fabia R5	10:33.4	A. Heller / Díaz
11 May	SS10	Rio Lia 2	24.90 km	A. Heller / Díaz	Ford Fiesta R5	14:20.2	A. Heller / Díaz
11 May	SS11	Maria Las Cruces 2	23.09 km	Katsuta / Barritt	Ford Fiesta R5	15:01.7	A. Heller / Díaz
11 May	SS12	Pelun 2	16.59 km	Katsuta / Barritt	Ford Fiesta R5	10:47.2	Katsuta / Barritt
12 May	SS13	Bio Bio 1	14.41 km	Katsuta / Barritt	Ford Fiesta R5	8:46.8	Katsuta / Barritt
12 May	SS14	Lircay	18.06 km	Martínez Fontena / Alvarez	Škoda Fabia R5	11:03.7	Katsuta / Barritt
12 May	SS15	San Nicolàs	15.28 km	Martínez Fontena / Alvarez	Škoda Fabia R5	8:44.3	Katsuta / Barritt
12 May	SS16	Bio Bio 2	14.41 km	Martínez Fontena / Alvarez	Škoda Fabia R5	8:31.3	Katsuta / Barritt

==== Championship standings ====
Pos.	Drivers' championships			Co-drivers' championships		
Pos.	Move	Driver	Points	Move	Co-driver	Points
1		Benito Guerra	61		Jaime Zapata	61
2	7	Takamoto Katsuta	47	7	Daniel Barritt	47
3	1	Ole Christian Veiby	40	1	Jonas Andersson	40
4	1	Nikolay Gryazin	28	1	Yaroslav Fedorov	28
5	1	Alberto Heller	27	1	José Díaz	27

== Notes ==
Previous rally: 2019 Rally Argentina	2019 FIA World Rally Championship	Next rally: 2019 Rally de Portugal
Previous rally: none	2019 Rally Chile	Next rally: 2023 Rally Chile; 2020 and 2021 editions cancelled
