= Ford Fiesta WRC =

Ford World Rally Car

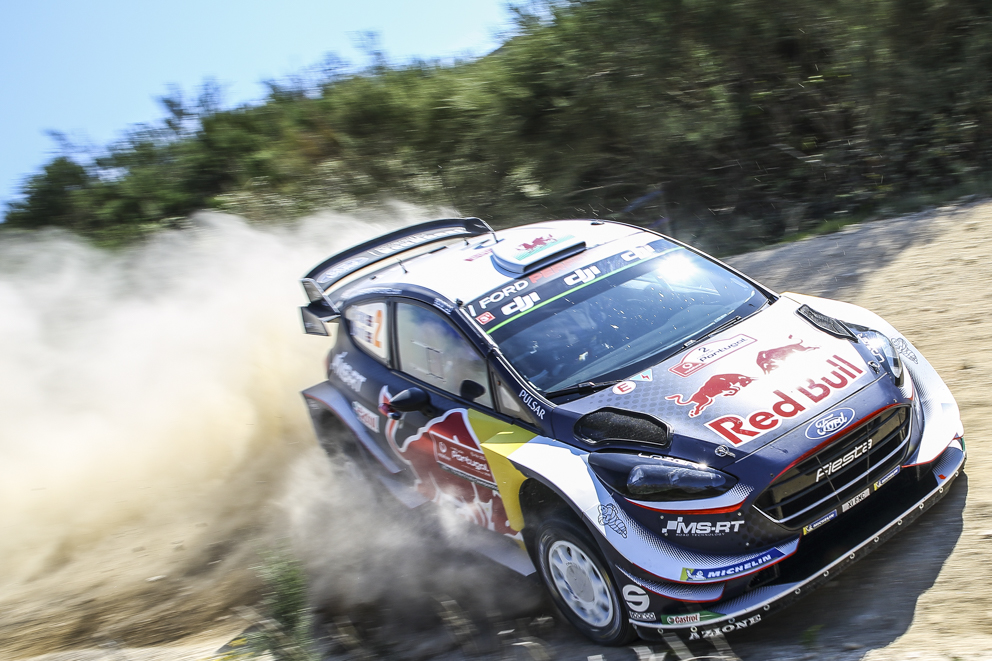
- The No. 2 Fiesta WRC during the 2018 Rally de Portugal.
- Category: World Rally Car
- Constructor: M-Sport
- Designer: Christian Loriaux
- Predecessor: Ford Fiesta RS WRC
- Successor: Ford Puma Rally1

Technical specifications
- Suspension: MacPherson struts with Reiger adjustable dampers
- Length: 4,130 mm
- Width: 1,875 mm
- Wheelbase: 2,493 mm
- Engine: Ford EcoBoost 1,596 cc (97.4 cu in) I4 turbo direct injection
- Transmission: Six-speed sequential gearbox developed by M-Sport and Ricardo with hydraulic shift Four-wheel drive Mechanical front and rear differentials with active centre differential
- Weight: 1,190 kg
- Brakes: Gravel: 300mm Brembo ventilated discs with Brembo four- piston monoblock calipers; Asphalt: 370mm/355mm Brembo ventilated discs with Brembo four-piston monoblock calipers
- Tyres: Michelin (2017–2018); DMACK (2017)
- Clutch: Multi disc clutch developed by M-Sport and AP Racing

Competition history (WRC)
- Notable entrants: (United Kingdom) M-Sport Ford WRT
- Notable drivers: (France) Bryan Bouffier; (United Kingdom) Elfyn Evans; (France) Sébastien Ogier; (Finland) Teemu Suninen; (Estonia) Ott Tänak; (Sweden) Pontus Tidemand
- Debut: (Monaco) 2017 Monte Carlo Rally
- First win: (Monaco) 2017 Monte Carlo Rally
- Last win: (United Kingdom) 2018 Wales Rally GB
- Last event: (Italy) 2021 Rally Monza
| Races | Wins | Podiums | Titles |
|---|---|---|---|
| 58 | 9 | 32 | 5 |
- Constructors' Championships: 1 (2017)
- Drivers' Championships: 2 (2017, 2018)

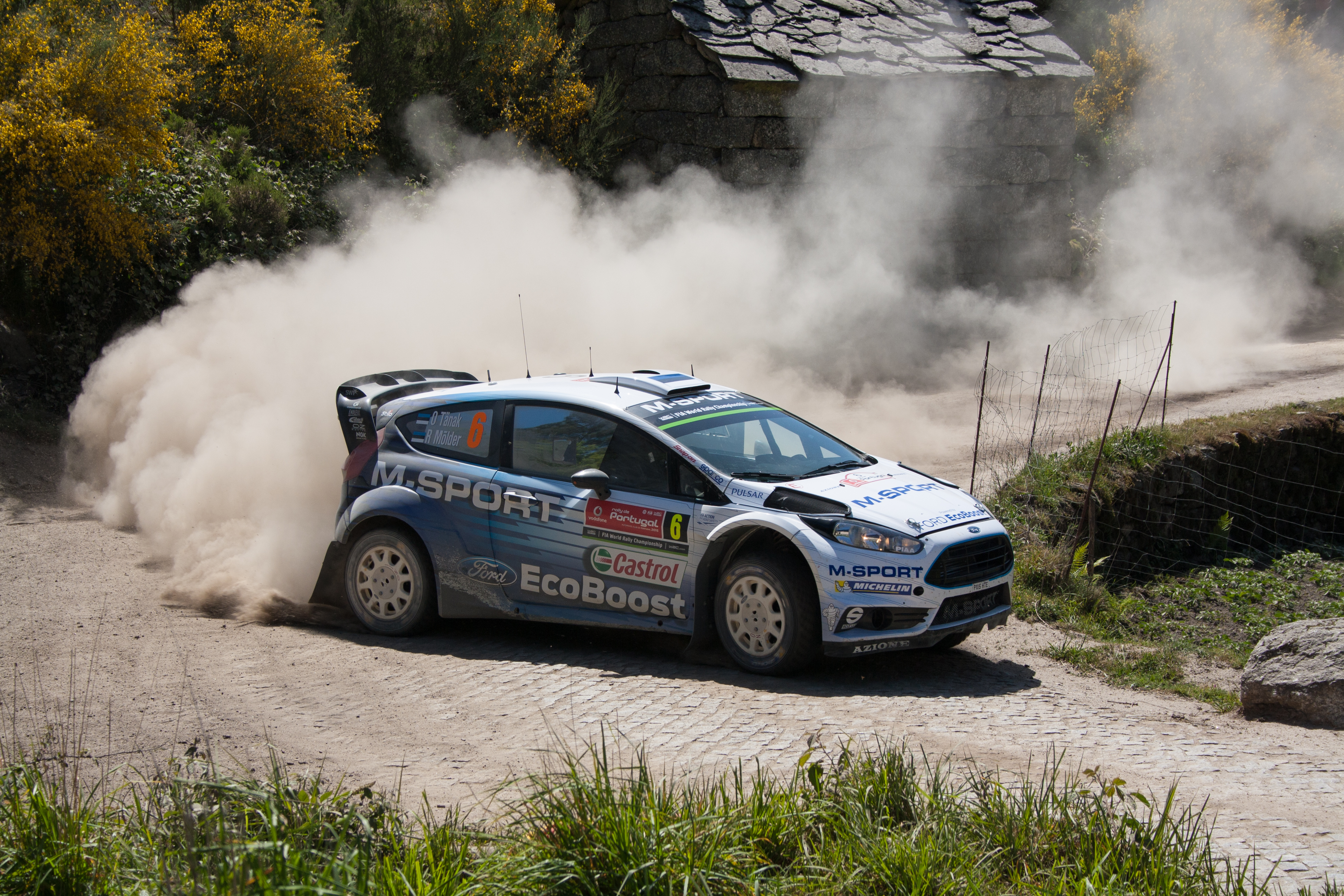

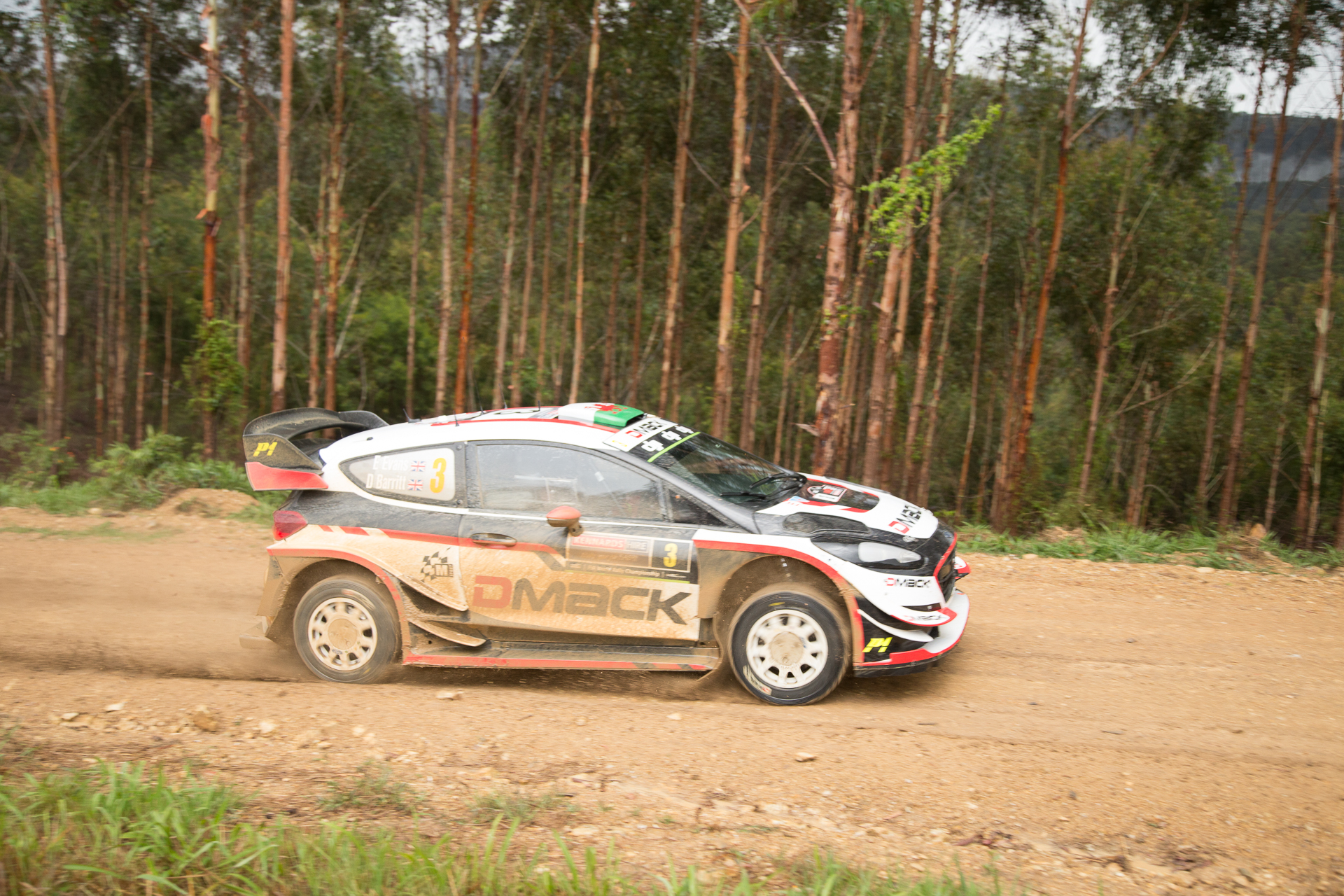
Comparison between the Fiesta RS WRC (top) and the Fiesta WRC (bottom) showing the larger front splitter, rear wing and the addition of aerodynamic devices on the Fiesta WRC.

The Ford Fiesta WRC is a World Rally Car built by the M-Sport World Rally Team for use in the World Rally Championship starting in 2017. (Note: Ford registered as a manufacturer in 2018. M-Sport continued to build and operate the cars under the name "M-Sport Ford World Rally Team".) It is based upon the 2017 Ford Fiesta road car, and replaced the Ford Fiesta RS WRC, which competed between 2011 and 2016. It was built to the fourth generation of World Rally Car regulations that were introduced in 2017.

The Fiesta WRC was successful from its début, winning the 2017 Monte Carlo Rally, first round it entered. The car took five wins in its first season, with two for Sébastien Ogier and Julien Ingrassia, two for Ott Tänak and Martin Järveoja, and one for Elfyn Evans and Daniel Barritt. Ogier and Ingrassia went on to win the World Championships for Drivers and Co-Drivers, their fifth titles. M-Sport won the World Championship for Manufacturers, their first title since 2007.

== World Rally Championship results ==
=== Championship titles ===
| Year | Title | Competitor | Entries | Wins | Podiums | Points |
|---|---|---|---|---|---|---|
| 2017 | FIA World Rally Championship for Drivers | (France) Sébastien Ogier | 13 | 2 | 9 | 232 |
| 2017 | FIA World Rally Championship for Co-Drivers | (France) Julien Ingrassia | 13 | 2 | 9 | 232 |
| 2017 | FIA World Rally Championship for Manufacturers | (United Kingdom) M-Sport World Rally Team | 39 | 5 | 19 | 428 |
| 2018 | FIA World Rally Championship for Drivers | (France) Sébastien Ogier | 13 | 4 | 6 | 219 |
| 2018 | FIA World Rally Championship for Co-Drivers | (France) Julien Ingrassia | 13 | 4 | 6 | 219 |

=== Rally victories ===
| Year | No. | Event | Surface | Driver | Co-driver | Entrant |
|---|---|---|---|---|---|---|
| 2017 | 1 | (Monaco) Rallye Automobile Monte Carlo | Mixed | (France) Sébastien Ogier | (France) Julien Ingrassia | (United Kingdom) M-Sport World Rally Team |
| 2017 | 2 | Rally de Portugal | Gravel | (France) Sébastien Ogier | (France) Julien Ingrassia | (United Kingdom) M-Sport World Rally Team |
| 2017 | 3 | (Italy) Rally Italia Sardegna | Gravel | (Estonia) Ott Tänak | (Estonia) Martin Järveoja | (United Kingdom) M-Sport World Rally Team |
| 2017 | 4 | (Germany) ADAC Rallye Deutschland | Tarmac | (Estonia) Ott Tänak | (Estonia) Martin Järveoja | (United Kingdom) M-Sport World Rally Team |
| 2017 | 5 | (United Kingdom) Wales Rally GB | Gravel | (United Kingdom) Elfyn Evans | (United Kingdom) Daniel Barritt | (United Kingdom) M-Sport World Rally Team |
| 2018 | 6 | (Monaco) Rallye Automobile Monte Carlo | Mixed | (France) Sébastien Ogier | (France) Julien Ingrassia | (United Kingdom) M-Sport Ford World Rally Team |
| 2018 | 7 | Rally Mexico | Gravel | (France) Sébastien Ogier | (France) Julien Ingrassia | (United Kingdom) M-Sport Ford World Rally Team |
| 2018 | 8 | (France) Tour de Corse | Tarmac | (France) Sébastien Ogier | (France) Julien Ingrassia | (United Kingdom) M-Sport Ford World Rally Team |
| 2018 | 9 | (United Kingdom) Wales Rally GB | Gravel | (France) Sébastien Ogier | (France) Julien Ingrassia | (United Kingdom) M-Sport Ford World Rally Team |

== WRC results ==
| Year | Entrant | Driver | Rounds | | | | | | | | | | | | | | Points | WCM pos. |
| Year | Entrant | Driver | 1 | 2 | 3 | 4 | 5 | 6 | 7 | 8 | 9 | 10 | 11 | 12 | 13 | 14 | Points | WCM pos. |
|---|---|---|---|---|---|---|---|---|---|---|---|---|---|---|---|---|---|---|
| 2017 | (United Kingdom) M-Sport WRT | (France) Sébastien Ogier | MON; 1 | SWE; 3 | MEX; 2 | FRA; 2 | ARG; 4 | POR; 1 | ITA; 5 | POL; 3 | FIN; Ret | GER; 3 | ESP; 2 | GBR; 3 | AUS; 4 | | 428 | 1st |
| 2017 | (United Kingdom) M-Sport WRT | (Estonia) Ott Tänak | MON; 3 | SWE; 2 | MEX; 4 | FRA; 11 | ARG; 3 | POR; 4 | ITA; 1 | POL; Ret | FIN; 7 | GER; 1 | ESP; 3 | GBR; 6 | AUS; 2 | | 428 | 1st |
| 2017 | (United Kingdom) M-Sport WRT | (United Kingdom) Elfyn Evans | MON; 6 | SWE; 6 | MEX; 9 | FRA; 21 | ARG; 2 | POR; 6 | ITA; Ret | POL; 8 | FIN; 2 | GER; 6 | ESP; 7 | GBR; 1 | AUS; 5 | | 428 | 1st |
| 2017 | (United Kingdom) M-Sport WRT | (Norway) Mads Østberg | MON | SWE; 15 | MEX | FRA | ARG; 9 | POR; 8 | ITA; 7 | POL; 7 | FIN; 10 | GER; 5 | ESP | GBR; 38 | AUS | | – | – |
| 2017 | (United Kingdom) M-Sport WRT | (Germany) Armin Kremer | MON | SWE | MEX | FRA | ARG | POR | ITA | POL | FIN | GER; 9 | ESP | GBR | AUS | | – | – |
| 2017 | (United Kingdom) M-Sport WRT | (Finland) Teemu Suninen | MON | SWE | MEX | FRA | ARG | POR | ITA | POL; 6 | FIN; 4 | GER | ESP | GBR | AUS | | – | – |
| 2017 | (United Kingdom) M-Sport WRT | (Italy) Lorenzo Bertelli | MON | SWE | MEX; 16 | FRA | ARG; Ret | POR | ITA | POL | FIN | GER | ESP | GBR | AUS | | – | – |
| 2018 | (United Kingdom) M-Sport Ford WRT | (France) Sébastien Ogier | MON; 1 | SWE; 10 | MEX; 1 | FRA; 1 | ARG; 4 | POR; Ret | ITA; 2 | FIN; 5 | GER; 4 | TUR; 10 | GBR; 1 | ESP; 2 | AUS; 5 | | 324 | 3rd |
| 2018 | (United Kingdom) M-Sport Ford WRT | (United Kingdom) Elfyn Evans | MON; 6 | SWE; 14 | MEX; Ret | FRA; 5 | ARG; 6 | POR; 2 | ITA; 14 | FIN; 7 | GER; 25 | TUR; 12 | GBR; 20 | ESP; 3 | AUS; 6 | | 324 | 3rd |
| 2018 | (United Kingdom) M-Sport Ford WRT | (Finland) Teemu Suninen | MON | SWE; 8 | MEX; 12 | FRA | ARG; 9 | POR; 3 | ITA; 10 | FIN; 6 | GER; 5 | TUR; 4 | GBR; Ret | ESP; 11 | AUS; Ret | | 324 | 3rd |
| 2018 | (United Kingdom) M-Sport Ford WRT | (France) Bryan Bouffier | MON; 8 | SWE | MEX | FRA; Ret | ARG | POR | ITA | FIN | GER | TUR | GBR | ESP | AUS | | 324 | 3rd |
| 2018 | (United Kingdom) M-Sport Ford WRT | (Greece) Jourdan Serderidis | MON | SWE | MEX | FRA | ARG | POR | ITA | FIN | GER; 18 | TUR | GBR | ESP | AUS; 10 | | – | – |
| 2018 | (Norway) Henning Solberg | (Norway) Henning Solberg | MON | SWE; 19 | MEX | FRA | ARG | POR | ITA | FIN | GER | TUR | GBR | ESP | AUS | | – | – |
| 2018 | (United States) Hoonigan Racing | (United States) Ken Block | MON | SWE | MEX | FRA | ARG | POR | ITA | FIN | GER | TUR | GBR | ESP; Ret | AUS | | – | – |
| 2019 | (United Kingdom) M-Sport Ford WRT | (United Kingdom) Elfyn Evans | MON; Ret | SWE; 5 | MEX; 3 | FRA; 3 | ARG; Ret | CHL; 4 | POR; 5 | ITA; 4 | FIN; WD | GER | TUR; WD | GBR; 5 | ESP; 6 | AUS; C | 218 | 4th |
| 2019 | (United Kingdom) M-Sport Ford WRT | (Finland) Teemu Suninen | MON; 11 | SWE; 23 | MEX; Ret | FRA; 5 | ARG; 7 | CHL; 5 | POR; 4 | ITA; 2 | FIN; 8 | GER; 29 | TUR; 4 | GBR; Ret | ESP; 7 | AUS; C | 218 | 4th |
| 2019 | (United Kingdom) M-Sport Ford WRT | (Sweden) Pontus Tidemand | MON; 20 | SWE; 8 | MEX | FRA | ARG | CHL | POR | ITA | FIN | GER | TUR; 9 | GBR; 7 | ESP | AUS; C | 218 | 4th |
| 2019 | (United Kingdom) M-Sport Ford WRT | (United Kingdom) Gus Greensmith | MON | SWE | MEX | FRA | ARG | CHL | POR; Ret | ITA | FIN; Ret | GER; 9 | TUR | GBR | ESP | AUS; C | 218 | 4th |
| 2019 | (United Kingdom) M-Sport Ford WRT | (New Zealand) Hayden Paddon | MON | SWE | MEX | FRA | ARG | CHL | POR | ITA | FIN; WD | GER | TUR | GBR | ESP | AUS; C | 218 | 4th |
| 2019 | (United Kingdom) M-Sport Ford WRT | (Italy) Lorenzo Bertelli | MON | SWE; 20 | MEX | FRA | ARG | CHL; 13 | POR | ITA | FIN | GER | TUR | GBR | ESP | AUS; C | – | – |
| 2019 | (Finland) Janne Tuohino | (Finland) Janne Tuohino | MON | SWE; 10 | MEX | FRA | ARG | CHL | POR | ITA | FIN | GER | TUR | GBR | ESP | AUS; C | – | – |
| 2019 | (Finland) JanPro | (Finland) Jouni Virtanen | MON | SWE | MEX | FRA | ARG | CHL | POR | ITA | FIN; 19 | GER | TUR | GBR | ESP | AUS; C | – | – |
| 2020 | (United Kingdom) M-Sport Ford WRT | (Finland) Teemu Suninen | MON; 8 | SWE; 8 | MEX; 3 | EST; 6 | TUR; Ret | ITA; 5 | MNZ; Ret | | | | | | | | 129 | 3rd |
| 2020 | (United Kingdom) M-Sport Ford WRT | (Finland) Esapekka Lappi | MON; 4 | SWE; 5 | MEX; Ret | EST; 7 | TUR; 6 | ITA; Ret | MNZ; 4 | | | | | | | | 129 | 3rd |
| 2020 | (United Kingdom) M-Sport Ford WRT | (United Kingdom) Gus Greensmith | MON; 63 | SWE | MEX; 9 | EST; 8 | TUR; 5 | ITA; 25 | MNZ; Ret | | | | | | | | 129 | 3rd |
| 2020 | (United Kingdom) M-Sport Ford WRT | (Lithuania) Deividas Jocius | MON; 17 | SWE; WD | MEX; WD | EST | TUR | ITA | MNZ | | | | | | | | – | – |
| 2020 | (Finland) JanPro | (Finland) Kimmo Kurkela | MON | SWE | MEX | EST; 25 | TUR | ITA | MNZ | | | | | | | | – | – |
| 2020 | (Estonia) OT Racing | (Estonia) Georg Gross | MON | SWE | MEX | EST; Ret | TUR | ITA | MNZ | | | | | | | | – | – |
| 2021 | (United Kingdom) M-Sport Ford WRT | (United Kingdom) Gus Greensmith | MON; 8 | ARC; 9 | CRO; 7 | POR; 5 | ITA; 26 | KEN; 4 | EST; 32 | BEL; 47 | GRE; 5 | FIN; 6 | ESP; 6 | MNZ; 8 | | | 199 | 3rd |
| 2021 | (United Kingdom) M-Sport Ford WRT | (Finland) Teemu Suninen | MON; Ret | ARC; 8 | CRO | POR | ITA; 31 | KEN | EST; 6 | BEL | GRE | FIN | ESP | MNZ | | | 199 | 3rd |
| 2021 | (United Kingdom) M-Sport Ford WRT | (France) Adrien Fourmaux | MON | ARC | CRO; 5 | POR; 6 | ITA | KEN; 5 | EST | BEL; Ret | GRE; 7 | FIN; 7 | ESP; 16 | MNZ; 55 | | | 199 | 3rd |
| 2021 | (United Kingdom) M-Sport Ford WRT | (Italy) Lorenzo Bertelli | MON | ARC; 51 | CRO | POR | ITA | KEN; 11 | EST | BEL | GRE | FIN | ESP | MNZ | | | – | – |
| 2021 | (Finland) JanPro | (Finland) Janne Tuohino | MON | ARC; Ret | CRO | POR | ITA | KEN | EST | BEL | GRE | FIN | ESP | MNZ | | | – | – |

* Season still in progress.

== See also ==
- World Rally Car
  - Citroën DS3 WRC
  - Citroën C3 WRC
  - Ford Fiesta RS WRC
  - Hyundai i20 WRC
  - Hyundai i20 Coupe WRC
  - Mini John Cooper Works WRC
  - Toyota Yaris WRC
  - Volkswagen Polo R WRC
- Ford Fiesta R5

== Notes ==
Awards
| Preceded by Volkswagen Polo R WRC | Autosport Awards; Rally Car of the Year; 2017–2018 | Succeeded by Toyota Yaris WRC |
