= Toyota Yaris WRC =

Toyota World Rally Car

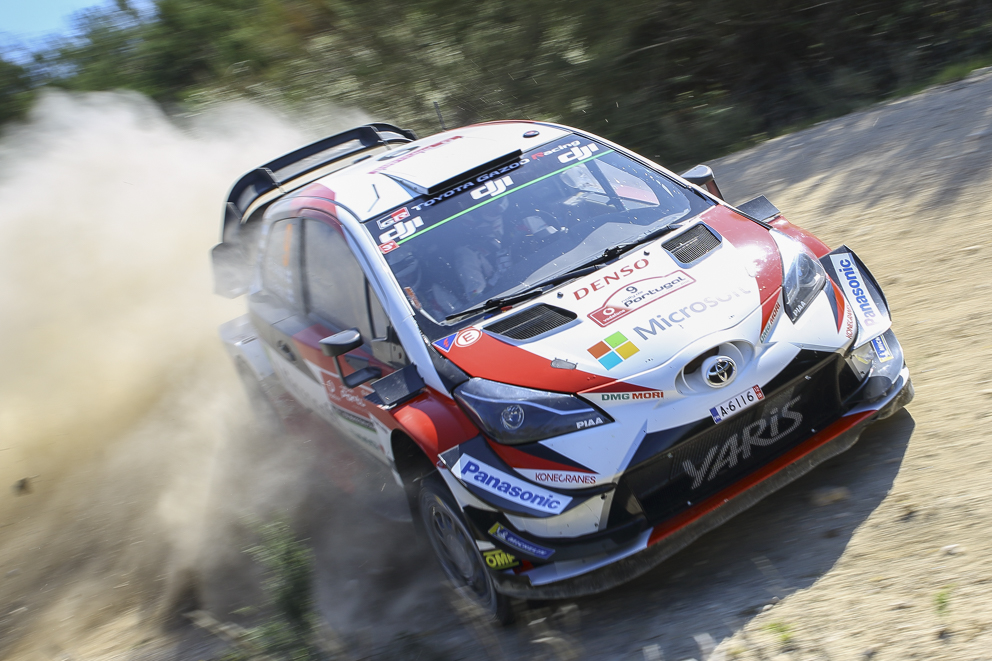
- The No. 9 Yaris WRC of Esapekka Lappi during the 2018 Rally de Portugal
- Category: World Rally Car
- Constructor: Toyota
- Designers: Michael Zotos (technical director); Tom Fowler (chief engineer); Simon Carrier (chief designer); Mikko Ruoho (chief of electronics)
- Predecessor: Toyota Corolla WRC (1997–1999)
- Successor: Toyota GR Yaris Rally1

Technical specifications
- Suspension: MacPherson
- Length: 4,085 mm
- Width: 1,875 mm
- Wheelbase: 2,511 mm
- Engine: Toyota GI4A 1.6 L (98 cu in) I4, 16-valve turbocharged
- Transmission: 6-speed hydraulic shift all wheel drive active centre and mechanical front and rear differentials
- Weight: 1,190 kg
- Fuel: Panta later Total (official fuel supplier of WRC)
- Lubricants: Mobil 1
- Brakes: 300mm gravel / 370mm asphalt
- Tyres: 2017–2020: Michelin; 2021: Pirelli P Zero (dry tarmac); Pirelli Cinturato (wet tarmac); Pirelli Sottozero (ice/snow); Pirelli Scorpion (dirt)
- Clutch: Double plate

Competition history (WRC)
- Notable entrants: (Japan) Toyota Gazoo Racing WRT
- Notable drivers: (Finland) Juho Hänninen; (Finland) Esapekka Lappi; (Finland) Jari-Matti Latvala; (Finland) Kalle Rovanperä; (Finland) Marcus Grönholm; (Finland) Mikko Hirvonen; (Finland) Valtteri Bottas; (Finland) Juha Kankkunen; (Finland) Tommi Mäkinen; (United Kingdom) Kris Meeke; (United Kingdom) Elfyn Evans; (Estonia) Ott Tänak; (France) Sébastien Ogier; (Japan) Takamoto Katsuta
- Debut: (Monaco) 2017 Monte Carlo Rally
- First win: 2017 Rally Sweden
- Last win: (Italy) 2021 Rally Monza
- Last event: (Italy) 2021 Rally Monza
Races	Wins	Podiums	Titles
58	26	59	8
- Constructors' Championships: 2 (2018, 2021)
- Drivers' Championships: 3 (2019, 2020, 2021)

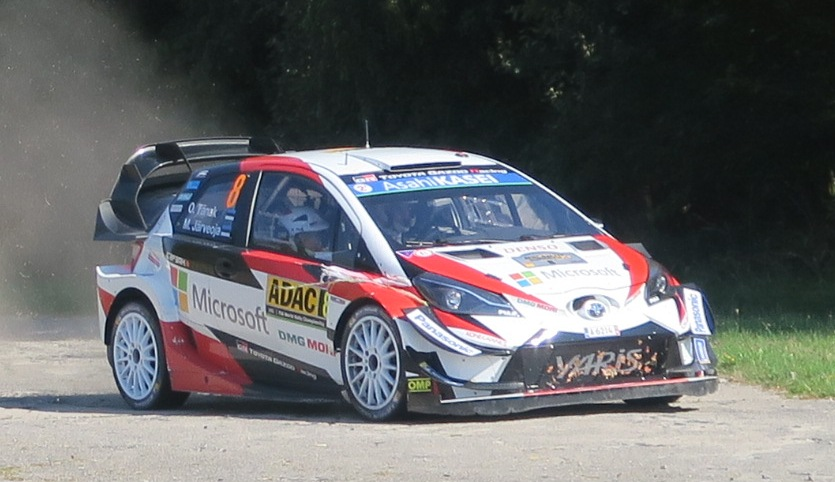
Ott Tänak and Martin Järveoja driving a Yaris WRC at the 2018 Rallye Deutschland

The Toyota Yaris WRC is a World Rally Car designed by Toyota Gazoo Racing WRT to compete in the World Rally Championship. The car is based on the Vitz-based XP130 Toyota Yaris, and is the first car Toyota have competed with in the WRC since withdrawing from the championship at the end of the 1999 season to focus on their Le Mans Prototype and Formula One programmes. The car was driven by Sébastien Ogier, Elfyn Evans, Ott Tänak, Kalle Rovanperä and Takamoto Katsuta.

The car entered its testing and development phase in March 2014, ahead of its début in the 2017 season. Development and operation of the cars would be overseen by four-time World Drivers' Champion Tommi Mäkinen, and entered under the banner of Toyota Gazoo Racing WRT. The car made its first public appearance in May 2016 during testing in Palokka-Puuppola, with Mäkinen and Juho Hänninen driving. The Toyota Gazoo Racing three car team of Toyota Yaris WRCs won the 2018 manufacturers' championship, followed in 2019 by the team's Ott Tänak and Martin Järveoja winning the 2019 drivers' and co-drivers' championships, the 2020 drivers' (Ogier) and co-drivers' (Julien Ingrassia) championships, and a sweep of the 2021 manufacturers', drivers' (Ogier) and co-drivers' (Ingrassia) championships.

A successor known as the Toyota GR Yaris WRC, based on the 2020 GR Yaris road car, was due to be introduced in 2021 but was later decided against in favour of sticking with the existing rally car. The Yaris WRC's true successor, the Toyota GR Yaris Rally1, would not be racing until the year after.

== World Rally Championship results ==
=== Championship titles ===
Year	Title	Competitor	Entries	Wins	Podiums	Points
2018	FIA World Rally Championship for Manufacturers	(Japan) Toyota Gazoo Racing WRT	39	5	14	368
2019	FIA World Rally Championship for Drivers	(Estonia) Ott Tänak	13	6	9	263
2019	FIA World Rally Championship for Co-Drivers	(Estonia) Martin Järveoja	13	6	9	263
2020	FIA World Rally Championship for Drivers	(France) Sébastien Ogier	7	2	5	122
2020	FIA World Rally Championship for Co-Drivers	(France) Julien Ingrassia	7	2	5	122
2021	FIA World Rally Championship for Manufacturers	(Japan) Toyota Gazoo Racing WRT	36	9	18	520
2021	FIA World Rally Championship for Drivers	(France) Sébastien Ogier	12	5	7	230
2021	FIA World Rally Championship for Co-Drivers	(France) Julien Ingrassia	12	5	7	230

=== WRC victories ===
Year	No.	Event	Surface	Driver	Co-driver	Entrant
2017	1	2017 Rally Sweden	Snow	(Finland) Jari-Matti Latvala	(Finland) Miikka Anttila	(Japan) Toyota Gazoo Racing WRT
2017	2	2017 Rally Finland	Gravel	(Finland) Esapekka Lappi	(Finland) Janne Ferm	(Japan) Toyota Gazoo Racing WRT
2018	3	2018 Rally Argentina	Gravel	(Estonia) Ott Tänak	(Estonia) Martin Järveoja	(Japan) Toyota Gazoo Racing WRT
2018	4	2018 Rally Finland	Gravel	(Estonia) Ott Tänak	(Estonia) Martin Järveoja	(Japan) Toyota Gazoo Racing WRT
2018	5	(Germany) 2018 Rallye Deutschland	Tarmac	(Estonia) Ott Tänak	(Estonia) Martin Järveoja	(Japan) Toyota Gazoo Racing WRT
2018	6	2018 Rally Turkey	Gravel	(Estonia) Ott Tänak	(Estonia) Martin Järveoja	(Japan) Toyota Gazoo Racing WRT
2018	7	2018 Rally Australia	Gravel	(Finland) Jari-Matti Latvala	(Finland) Miikka Anttila	(Japan) Toyota Gazoo Racing WRT
2019	8	2019 Rally Sweden	Snow	(Estonia) Ott Tänak	(Estonia) Martin Järveoja	(Japan) Toyota Gazoo Racing WRT
2019	9	2019 Rally Chile	Gravel	(Estonia) Ott Tänak	(Estonia) Martin Järveoja	(Japan) Toyota Gazoo Racing WRT
2019	10	2019 Rally de Portugal	Gravel	(Estonia) Ott Tänak	(Estonia) Martin Järveoja	(Japan) Toyota Gazoo Racing WRT
2019	11	2019 Rally Finland	Gravel	(Estonia) Ott Tänak	(Estonia) Martin Järveoja	(Japan) Toyota Gazoo Racing WRT
2019	12	(Germany) 2019 Rallye Deutschland	Tarmac	(Estonia) Ott Tänak	(Estonia) Martin Järveoja	(Japan) Toyota Gazoo Racing WRT
2019	13	(United Kingdom) 2019 Wales Rally GB	Gravel	(Estonia) Ott Tänak	(Estonia) Martin Järveoja	(Japan) Toyota Gazoo Racing WRT
2020	14	2020 Rally Sweden	Snow	(United Kingdom) Elfyn Evans	(United Kingdom) Scott Martin	(Japan) Toyota Gazoo Racing WRT
2020	15	2020 Rally Mexico	Gravel	(France) Sébastien Ogier	(France) Julien Ingrassia	(Japan) Toyota Gazoo Racing WRT
2020	16	2020 Rally Turkey	Gravel	(United Kingdom) Elfyn Evans	(United Kingdom) Scott Martin	(Japan) Toyota Gazoo Racing WRT
2020	17	(Italy) 2020 Rally Monza	Tarmac	(France) Sébastien Ogier	(France) Julien Ingrassia	(Japan) Toyota Gazoo Racing WRT
2021	18	(Monaco) 2021 Monte Carlo Rally	Mixed	(France) Sébastien Ogier	(France) Julien Ingrassia	(Japan) Toyota Gazoo Racing WRT
2021	19	2021 Croatia Rally	Tarmac	(France) Sébastien Ogier	(France) Julien Ingrassia	(Japan) Toyota Gazoo Racing WRT
2021	20	2021 Rally de Portugal	Gravel	(United Kingdom) Elfyn Evans	(United Kingdom) Scott Martin	(Japan) Toyota Gazoo Racing WRT
2021	21	(Italy) 2021 Rally Italia Sardegna	Gravel	(France) Sébastien Ogier	(France) Julien Ingrassia	(Japan) Toyota Gazoo Racing WRT
2021	22	(Kenya) 2021 Safari Rally	Gravel	(France) Sébastien Ogier	(France) Julien Ingrassia	(Japan) Toyota Gazoo Racing WRT
2021	23	2021 Rally Estonia	Gravel	(Finland) Kalle Rovanperä	(Finland) Jonne Halttunen	(Japan) Toyota Gazoo Racing WRT
2021	24	(Greece) 2021 Acropolis Rally	Gravel	(Finland) Kalle Rovanperä	(Finland) Jonne Halttunen	(Japan) Toyota Gazoo Racing WRT
2021	25	2021 Rally Finland	Gravel	(United Kingdom) Elfyn Evans	(United Kingdom) Scott Martin	(Japan) Toyota Gazoo Racing WRT
2021	26	(Italy) 2021 Rally Monza	Tarmac	(France) Sébastien Ogier	(France) Julien Ingrassia	(Japan) Toyota Gazoo Racing WRT

== WRC results ==
Year	Entrant	Driver	Rounds														Points	WCM pos.
Year	Entrant	Driver	1	2	3	4	5	6	7	8	9	10	11	12	13	14	Points	WCM pos.
2017	(Japan) Toyota Gazoo Racing WRT	(Finland) Jari-Matti Latvala	MON; 2	SWE; 1	MEX; 6	FRA; 4	ARG; 5	POR; 9	ITA; 2	POL; 20	FIN; 21	GER; 7	ESP; Ret	GBR; 5	AUS; Ret		251	3rd
2017	(Japan) Toyota Gazoo Racing WRT	(Finland) Juho Hänninen	MON; 16	SWE; 23	MEX; 7	FRA; Ret	ARG; 7	POR; 7	ITA; 6	POL; 10	FIN; 3	GER; 4	ESP; 4	GBR; Ret	AUS		251	3rd
2017	(Japan) Toyota Gazoo Racing WRT	(Finland) Esapekka Lappi	MON	SWE	MEX	FRA	ARG	POR; 10	ITA; 4	POL; Ret	FIN; 1	GER; 21	ESP; Ret	GBR; 9	AUS; 6		251	3rd
2018	(Japan) Toyota Gazoo Racing WRT	(Estonia) Ott Tänak	MON; 2	SWE; 9	MEX; 14	FRA; 2	ARG; 1	POR; Ret	ITA; 9	FIN; 1	GER; 1	TUR; 1	GBR; 19	ESP; 6	AUS; Ret		368	1st
2018	(Japan) Toyota Gazoo Racing WRT	(Finland) Jari-Matti Latvala	MON; 3	SWE; 7	MEX; 8	FRA; Ret	ARG; Ret	POR; 24	ITA; 7	FIN; 3	GER; Ret	TUR; 2	GBR; 2	ESP; 8	AUS; 1		368	1st
2018	(Japan) Toyota Gazoo Racing WRT	(Finland) Esapekka Lappi	MON; 7	SWE; 4	MEX; 11	FRA; 6	ARG; 8	POR; 5	ITA; 3	FIN; Ret	GER; 3	TUR; Ret	GBR; 3	ESP; 7	AUS; 4		368	1st
2019	(Japan) Toyota Gazoo Racing WRT	(Estonia) Ott Tänak	MON; 3	SWE; 1	MEX; 2	FRA; 6	ARG; 8	CHL; 1	POR; 1	ITA; 5	FIN; 1	GER; 1	TUR; 16	GBR; 1	ESP; 2	AUS; C	362	2nd
2019	(Japan) Toyota Gazoo Racing WRT	(Finland) Jari-Matti Latvala	MON; 5	SWE; 21	MEX; 8	FRA; 10	ARG; 5	CHL; 11	POR; 7	ITA; 19	FIN; 3	GER; 3	TUR; 6	GBR; Ret	ESP; 5	AUS; C	362	2nd
2019	(Japan) Toyota Gazoo Racing WRT	(United Kingdom) Kris Meeke	MON; 6	SWE; 6	MEX; 5	FRA; 9	ARG; 4	CHL; 10	POR; Ret	ITA; 8	FIN; Ret	GER; 2	TUR; 7	GBR; 4	ESP; 29	AUS; C	362	2nd
2019	(Finland) GRX Team	(Finland) Marcus Grönholm	MON	SWE; 38	MEX	FRA	ARG	CHL	POR	ITA	FIN	GER	TUR	GBR	ESP	AUS; C	–	–
2019	(Finland) Tommi Mäkinen Racing	(Finland) Juho Hänninen	MON	SWE	MEX	FRA	ARG	CHL	POR	ITA; Ret	FIN						–	–
2019	(Finland) Tommi Mäkinen Racing	(Japan) Takamoto Katsuta										GER; 10	TUR	GBR	ESP; 39	AUS; C	–	–
2020	(Japan) Toyota Gazoo Racing WRT	(France) Sébastien Ogier	MON; 2	SWE; 4	MEX; 1	EST; 3	TUR; Ret	ITA; 3	MNZ; 1								236	2nd
2020	(Japan) Toyota Gazoo Racing WRT	(United Kingdom) Elfyn Evans	MON; 3	SWE; 1	MEX; 4	EST; 4	TUR; 1	ITA; 4	MNZ; 29								236	2nd
2020	(Japan) Toyota Gazoo Racing WRT	(Finland) Kalle Rovanperä	MON; 5	SWE; 3	MEX; 5	EST; 5	TUR; 4	ITA; Ret	MNZ; 5								236	2nd
2020	(Japan) Toyota Gazoo Racing WRT	(Japan) Takamoto Katsuta	MON; 7	SWE; 9	MEX	EST; Ret	TUR	ITA; Ret	MNZ; 20								–	–
2020	(Finland) Latvala Motorsport	(Finland) Jari-Matti Latvala	MON	SWE; Ret	MEX	EST	TUR	ITA	MNZ								–	–
2021	(Japan) Toyota Gazoo Racing WRT	(France) Sébastien Ogier	MON; 1	ARC; 20	CRO; 1	POR; 3	ITA; 1	KEN; 1	EST; 4	BEL; 5	GRE; 3	FIN; 5	ESP; 4	MNZ; 1			520	1st
2021	(Japan) Toyota Gazoo Racing WRT	(United Kingdom) Elfyn Evans	MON; 2	ARC; 5	CRO; 2	POR; 1	ITA; 2	KEN; 10	EST; 5	BEL; 4	GRE; 6	FIN; 1	ESP; 2	MNZ; 2			520	1st
2021	(Japan) Toyota Gazoo Racing WRT	(Finland) Kalle Rovanperä	MON; 4	ARC; 2	CRO; Ret	POR; 22	ITA; 25	KEN; 6	EST; 1	BEL; 3	GRE; 1	FIN; 34	ESP; 5	MNZ; 9			520	1st
2021	(Japan) Toyota Gazoo Racing WRT	(Japan) Takamoto Katsuta	MON; 6	ARC; 6	CRO; 6	POR; 4	ITA; 4	KEN; 2	EST; Ret	BEL; Ret	GRE; WD	FIN; 37	ESP; 40	MNZ; 7			–	–
2021	(Finland) RTE-Motorsport	(Finland) Esapekka Lappi	MON	ARC	CRO	POR	ITA	KEN	EST	BEL	GRE	FIN; 4	ESP	MNZ			–	–

* Season still in progress.

== See also ==
- World Rally Car
  - Citroën DS3 WRC
  - Citroën C3 WRC
  - Ford Fiesta RS WRC
  - Ford Fiesta WRC
  - Hyundai i20 WRC
  - Hyundai i20 Coupe WRC
  - Mini John Cooper Works WRC
  - Volkswagen Polo R WRC

Awards
Preceded by Ford Fiesta WRC	Autosport Awards; Rally Car of the Year; 2019–2021	Succeeded by Toyota GR Yaris Rally1
