= 2017 Rally Italia Sardegna =

Motor rally competition

2017 Rally d'Italia Sardegna 14° Rally Italia Sardegna 2017
Round 7 of the 2017 World Rally Championship
← Previous event	Next event →
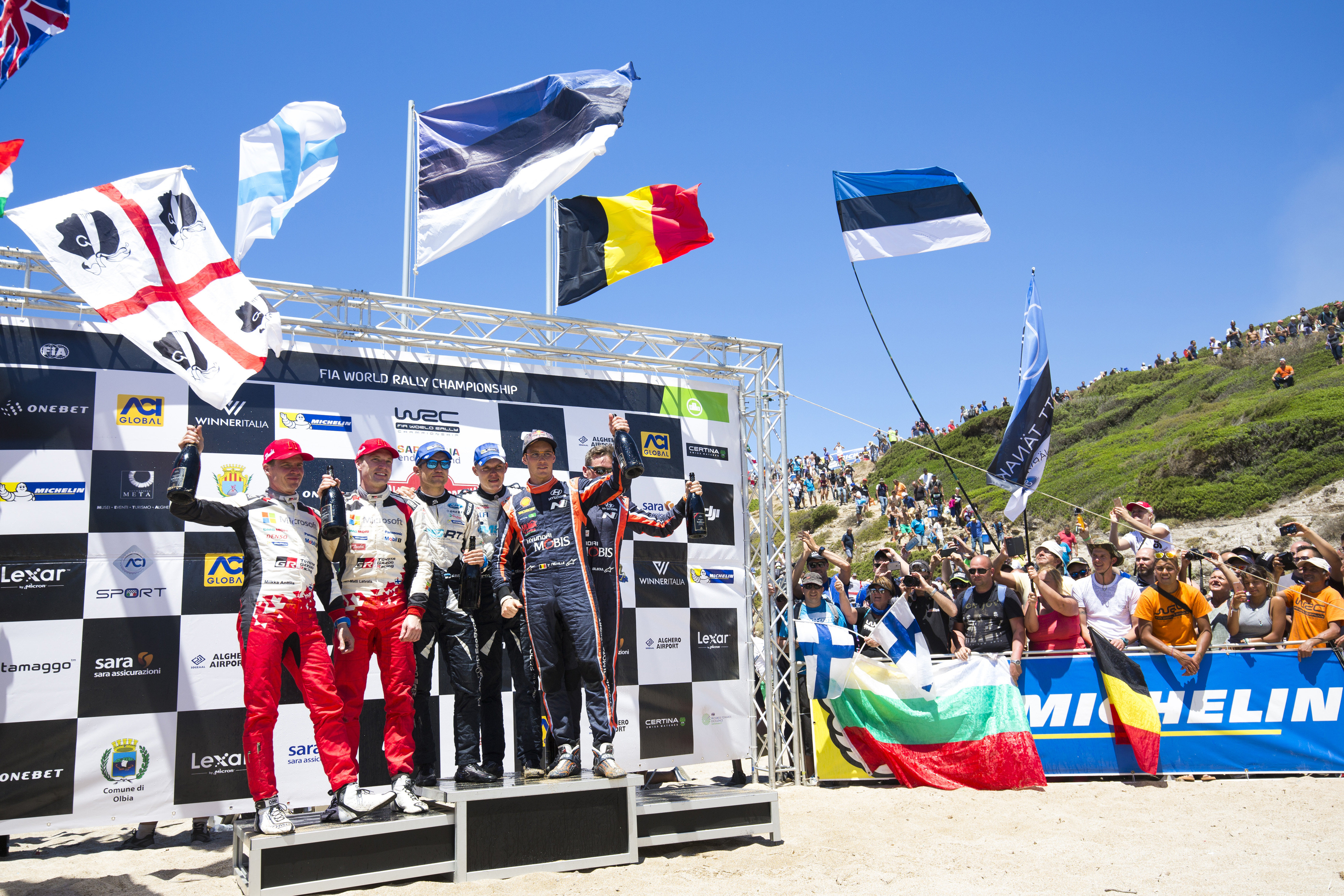
- Rally podium
- Host country: Italy
- Rally base: (Italy) Alghero
- Dates run: 8 – 11 June 2017
- Stages: 19 (312.66 km; 194.28 miles)
- Stage surface: Gravel

Statistics
- Crews: 53 at start, 41 at finish

Overall results
- Overall winner: (Estonia) Ott Tänak (Estonia) Martin Järveoja (United Kingdom) M-Sport World Rally Team

The 2017 Rally Italia Sardegna was the seventh round of the 2017 World Rally Championship and was the 14th running of the Rally d'Italia Sardegna. It was won by Ott Tänak and co-driver Martin Järveoja which was their first win in the WRC. Jari-Matti Latvala and Miikka Anttila finished second, with Thierry Neuville and Nicolas Gilsoul finished in third position.

Championship leaders Sébastien Ogier and Julien Ingrassia, Tänak and Järveoja's teammates at M-Sport, finished fifth, helping the team extend their lead in the championship for manufacturers.

Jan Kopecký and his co-driver Pavel Dresler won the WRC-2 category.

== Entry list ==
Notable entrants
No.	Entrant	Class	Driver	Co-driver	Car	Tyre
1	(United Kingdom) M-Sport World Rally Team	WRC	(France) Sébastien Ogier	(France) Julien Ingrassia	Ford Fiesta WRC	M
2	(United Kingdom) M-Sport World Rally Team	WRC	(Estonia) Ott Tänak	(Estonia) Martin Järveoja	Ford Fiesta WRC	M
3	(United Kingdom) M-Sport World Rally Team	WRC	(United Kingdom) Elfyn Evans	(United Kingdom) Daniel Barritt	Ford Fiesta WRC	D
4	(South Korea) Hyundai Motorsport	WRC	(New Zealand) Hayden Paddon	(United Kingdom) Sebastian Marshall	Hyundai i20 Coupe WRC	M
5	(South Korea) Hyundai Motorsport	WRC	(Belgium) Thierry Neuville	(Belgium) Nicolas Gilsoul	Hyundai i20 Coupe WRC	M
6	(South Korea) Hyundai Motorsport	WRC	(Spain) Dani Sordo	(Spain) Marc Martí	Hyundai i20 Coupe WRC	M
7	(France) Citroën Total Abu Dhabi WRT	WRC	(United Kingdom) Kris Meeke	(Republic of Ireland) Paul Nagle	Citroën C3 WRC	M
8	(France) Citroën Total Abu Dhabi WRT	WRC	(Republic of Ireland) Craig Breen	(United Kingdom) Scott Martin	Citroën C3 WRC	M
9	(France) Citroën Total Abu Dhabi WRT	WRC	(Norway) Andreas Mikkelsen	(Norway) Anders Jæger	Citroën C3 WRC	M
10	(Japan) Toyota Gazoo Racing WRT	WRC	(Finland) Jari-Matti Latvala	(Finland) Miikka Anttila	Toyota Yaris WRC	M
11	(Japan) Toyota Gazoo Racing WRT	WRC	(Finland) Juho Hänninen	(Finland) Kaj Lindström	Toyota Yaris WRC	M
12	(Japan) Toyota Gazoo Racing WRT	WRC	(Finland) Esapekka Lappi	(Finland) Janne Ferm	Toyota Yaris WRC	M
14	(United Kingdom) M-Sport World Rally Team	WRC	(Norway) Mads Østberg	(Norway) Ola Fløene	Ford Fiesta WRC	M
20	(Saudi Arabia) Yazeed Racing	WRC	(Saudi Arabia) Yazeed Al Rajhi	(United Kingdom) Michael Orr	Ford Fiesta RS WRC	M
21	(Czech Republic) OneBet Jipocar World Rally Team	WRC	(Czech Republic) Martin Prokop	(Czech Republic) Jan Tománek	Ford Fiesta RS WRC	D
22	(France) Jean-Michel Raoux	WRC	(France) Jean-Michel Raoux	(France) Laurent Magat	Citroën DS3 WRC	D

Key
Icon	Class
WRC	WRC entries eligible to score manufacturer points
WRC	Major entry ineligible to score manufacturer points
WRC	Registered to score points in WRC Trophy
WRC-2	Registered to take part in WRC-2 championship
WRC-3	Registered to take part in WRC-3 championship

== Classification ==
=== Event standings ===
Pos.	No.	Driver	Co-driver	Team	Car	Class	Time	Difference	Points
1	2	(Estonia) Ott Tänak	(Estonia) Martin Järveoja	(United Kingdom) M-Sport World Rally Team	Ford Fiesta WRC	WRC	3:25:15.1	0.0	25
2	10	(Finland) Jari-Matti Latvala	(Finland) Miikka Anttila	(Japan) Toyota Gazoo Racing WRT	Toyota Yaris WRC	WRC	3:25:27.4	+12.3	19
3	5	(Belgium) Thierry Neuville	(Belgium) Nicolas Gilsoul	(South Korea) Hyundai Motorsport	Hyundai i20 Coupe WRC	WRC	3:26:22.8	+1:07.7	17
4	12	(Finland) Esapekka Lappi	(Finland) Janne Ferm	(Japan) Toyota Gazoo Racing WRT	Toyota Yaris WRC	WRC	3:27:28.0	+2:12.9	17
5	1	(France) Sébastien Ogier	(France) Julien Ingrassia	(United Kingdom) M-Sport World Rally Team	Ford Fiesta WRC	WRC	3:28:40.4	+3:25.3	13
6	11	(Finland) Juho Hänninen	(Finland) Kaj Lindström	(Japan) Toyota Gazoo Racing WRT	Toyota Yaris WRC	WRC	3:28:53.6	+3:38.5	8
7	14	(Norway) Mads Østberg	(Norway) Ola Fløene	(United Kingdom) M-Sport World Rally Team	Ford Fiesta WRC	WRC	3:31:46.9	+6:31.8	6
8	9	(Norway) Andreas Mikkelsen	(Norway) Anders Jæger	(France) Citroën Total Abu Dhabi WRT	Citroën C3 WRC	WRC	3:33:22.9	+8:07.8	4
9	81	(France) Eric Camilli	(France) Benjamin Veillas	(United Kingdom) M-Sport World Rally Team	Ford Fiesta R5		3:36:30.9	+11:15.8	2
10	34	(Czech Republic) Jan Kopecký	(Czech Republic) Pavel Dresler	(Czech Republic) Škoda Motorsport II	Škoda Fabia R5	WRC-2	3:36:36.5	+11:21.4	1
12	6	(Spain) Dani Sordo	(Spain) Marc Martí	(South Korea) Hyundai Motorsport	Hyundai i20 Coupe WRC	WRC	3:42:17.9	+17:02.8	4

=== Special stages ===
Day	Stage	Name	Length	Winner	Car	Time	Rally Leader
Leg 1 (8 June)	SS1	Ittiri Arena Show	2.00 km	(Belgium) Thierry Neuville	Hyundai i20 Coupe WRC	2:01.8	(Belgium) Thierry Neuville
Leg 2 (9 June)	SS2	Terranova 1	14.54 km	(United Kingdom) Kris Meeke	Citroën C3 WRC	10:14.1	(United Kingdom) Kris Meeke
Leg 2 (9 June)	SS3	Monte Olia 1	19.05 km	(Finland) Juho Hänninen	Toyota Yaris WRC	13:25.8	(Finland) Juho Hänninen
Leg 2 (9 June)	SS4	Tula 1	15.00 km	(Spain) Dani Sordo	Hyundai i20 Coupe WRC	11:51.2	(United Kingdom) Kris Meeke
Leg 2 (9 June)	SS5	Tergu - Osilo 1	14.14 km	(Finland) Esapekka Lappi	Toyota Yaris WRC	9:06.3	(New Zealand) Hayden Paddon
Leg 2 (9 June)	SS6	Terranova 2	14.54 km	(Finland) Esapekka Lappi	Toyota Yaris WRC	9:59.5	(New Zealand) Hayden Paddon
Leg 2 (9 June)	SS7	Monte Olia 2	19.05 km	(Finland) Esapekka Lappi	Toyota Yaris WRC	13:04.9	(New Zealand) Hayden Paddon
Leg 2 (9 June)	SS8	Tula 2	15.00 km	(Spain) Dani Sordo	Hyundai i20 Coupe WRC	11:38.5	(New Zealand) Hayden Paddon
Leg 2 (9 June)	SS9	Tergu - Osilo 2	14.14 km	(Spain) Dani Sordo	Hyundai i20 Coupe WRC	8:53.2	(New Zealand) Hayden Paddon
Leg 3 (10 June)	SS10	Coiluna - Loelle 1	14.95 km	(New Zealand) Hayden Paddon	Hyundai i20 Coupe WRC	8:00.8	(New Zealand) Hayden Paddon
Leg 3 (10 June)	SS11	Monti di Ala' 1	28.52 km	(Belgium) Thierry Neuville	Hyundai i20 Coupe WRC	17:02.8	(New Zealand) Hayden Paddon
Leg 3 (10 June)	SS12	Monte Lerno 1	28.11 km	(Estonia) Ott Tänak	Ford Fiesta WRC	17:54.5	(New Zealand) Hayden Paddon
Leg 3 (10 June)	SS13	Coiluna - Loelle 2	14.95 km	(Estonia) Ott Tänak	Ford Fiesta WRC	7:52.0	(Estonia) Ott Tänak
Leg 3 (10 June)	SS14	Monti di Ala' 2	28.52 km	(Estonia) Ott Tänak	Ford Fiesta WRC	16:48.1	(Estonia) Ott Tänak
Leg 3 (10 June)	SS15	Monte Lerno 2	28.11 km	(Finland) Esapekka Lappi	Toyota Yaris WRC	17:35.8	(Estonia) Ott Tänak
Leg 4 (11 June)	SS16	Cala Flumini 1	14.06 km	(New Zealand) Hayden Paddon	Hyundai i20 Coupe WRC	8:58.3	(Estonia) Ott Tänak
Leg 4 (11 June)	SS17	Sassari - Argentiera 1	6.96 km	(Spain) Dani Sordo	Hyundai i20 Coupe WRC	5:10.0	(Estonia) Ott Tänak
Leg 4 (11 June)	SS18	Cala Flumini 2	14.06 km	(Finland) Esapekka Lappi	Toyota Yaris WRC	8:46.9	(Estonia) Ott Tänak
Leg 4 (11 June)	SS19	Sassari - Argentiera 2 [Power Stage]	6.96 km	(Finland) Esapekka Lappi	Toyota Yaris WRC	5:10.5	(Estonia) Ott Tänak

=== Power Stage ===
The Power Stage was a 6.96 km (4.3 mi) stage at the end of the rally.

Pos.	Driver	Co-driver	Car	Time	Diff.	Pts.
1	(Finland) Esapekka Lappi	(Finland) Janne Ferm	Toyota Yaris WRC	5:10.5		5
2	(Spain) Dani Sordo	(Spain) Marc Martí	Hyundai i20 Coupe WRC	5:10.9	+0.4	4
3	(France) Sébastien Ogier	(France) Julien Ingrassia	Ford Fiesta WRC	5:11.8	+1.3	3
4	(Belgium) Thierry Neuville	(Belgium) Nicolas Gilsoul	Hyundai i20 Coupe WRC	5:12.4	+1.9	2
5	(Finland) Jari-Matti Latvala	(Finland) Miikka Anttila	Toyota Yaris WRC	5:12.8	+2.3	1

=== Championship standings after the rally ===
Drivers' Championship standings

	Pos.	Driver	Points
	1	(France) Sébastien Ogier	141
	2	(Belgium) Thierry Neuville	123
1	3	(Estonia) Ott Tänak	108
1	4	(Finland) Jari-Matti Latvala	107
	5	(Spain) Dani Sordo	70

Manufacturers' Championship standings

Pos.	Manufacturer	Points
1	(United Kingdom) M-Sport World Rally Team	234
2	(South Korea) Hyundai Motorsport	194
3	(Japan) Toyota Gazoo Racing WRT	143
4	(France) Citroën Total Abu Dhabi WRT	97
