= 2017 Wales Rally GB =

Rally car race

2017 Wales Rally GB: 73. Dayinsure Wales Rally GB 2017
Round 12 of the 2017 World Rally Championship
← Previous event	Next event →
- Host country: United Kingdom
- Rally base: (Wales) Deeside
- Dates run: 26 – 29 October 2017
- Stages: 21 (304.36 km; 189.12 miles)
- Stage surface: Gravel

Statistics
- Crews: 75 at start, 65 at finish

Overall results
- Overall winner: (United Kingdom) Elfyn Evans (United Kingdom) Daniel Barritt (United Kingdom) M-Sport World Rally Team

The 2017 Wales Rally (formally the 73. Dayinsure Wales Rally GB) was the 12th round of the 2017 World Rally Championship. The rally was being held over four days between 26 October and 29 October 2017, and was based in Deeside, United Kingdom. Britons Elfyn Evans and Daniel Barritt won the rally on their home soil, which marked their first success in the WRC.

Sébastien Ogier and Julien Ingrassia finished the rally in third position which was enough to seal the drivers' title. M-Sport secured their first manufacturers' championship as a private team and its first since winning with Ford in 2007.

== Entry list ==
Notable entrants
No.	Entrant	Class	Driver	Co-driver	Car	Tyre
1	(United Kingdom) M-Sport World Rally Team	WRC	(France) Sébastien Ogier	(France) Julien Ingrassia	Ford Fiesta WRC	M
2	(United Kingdom) M-Sport World Rally Team	WRC	(Estonia) Ott Tänak	(Estonia) Martin Järveoja	Ford Fiesta WRC	M
3	(United Kingdom) M-Sport World Rally Team	WRC	(United Kingdom) Elfyn Evans	(United Kingdom) Daniel Barritt	Ford Fiesta WRC	D
4	(South Korea) Hyundai Motorsport	WRC	(New Zealand) Hayden Paddon	(United Kingdom) Sebastian Marshall	Hyundai i20 Coupe WRC	M
5	(South Korea) Hyundai Motorsport	WRC	(Belgium) Thierry Neuville	(Belgium) Nicolas Gilsoul	Hyundai i20 Coupe WRC	M
6	(South Korea) Hyundai Motorsport	WRC	(Norway) Andreas Mikkelsen	(Norway) Anders Jæger	Hyundai i20 Coupe WRC	M
7	(France) Citroën Total Abu Dhabi WRT	WRC	(United Arab Emirates) Khalid Al Qassimi	(United Kingdom) Chris Patterson	Citroën C3 WRC	M
8	(France) Citroën Total Abu Dhabi WRT	WRC	(Republic of Ireland) Craig Breen	(United Kingdom) Scott Martin	Citroën C3 WRC	M
9	(France) Citroën Total Abu Dhabi WRT	WRC	(United Kingdom) Kris Meeke	(Republic of Ireland) Paul Nagle	Citroën C3 WRC	M
10	(Japan) Toyota Gazoo Racing WRT	WRC	(Finland) Jari-Matti Latvala	(Finland) Miikka Anttila	Toyota Yaris WRC	M
11	(Japan) Toyota Gazoo Racing WRT	WRC	(Finland) Juho Hänninen	(Finland) Kaj Lindström	Toyota Yaris WRC	M
12	(Japan) Toyota Gazoo Racing WRT	WRC	(Finland) Esapekka Lappi	(Finland) Janne Ferm	Toyota Yaris WRC	M
16	(South Korea) Hyundai Motorsport	WRC	(Spain) Dani Sordo	(Spain) Marc Martí	Hyundai i20 Coupe WRC	M
20	(Saudi Arabia) Yazeed Racing	WRC	(Saudi Arabia) Yazeed Al-Rajhi	(United Kingdom) Michael Orr	Ford Fiesta RS WRC	M
86	(United Kingdom) Charles Payne	WRC	(United Kingdom) Charles Payne	(United Kingdom) Carl Williamson	Ford Fiesta RS WRC	P

Key
Icon	Class
WRC	WRC entries eligible to score manufacturer points
WRC	Major entry ineligible to score manufacturer points
WRC	Registered to score points in WRC Trophy
WRC-2	Registered to take part in WRC-2 championship
WRC-3	Registered to take part in WRC-3 championship

== Classification ==
=== Event standings ===
Pos.	No.	Driver	Co-driver	Team	Car	Class	Time	Difference	Points
Overall classification
1	3	(United Kingdom) Elfyn Evans	(United Kingdom) Daniel Barritt	(United Kingdom) M-Sport World Rally Team	Ford Fiesta WRC	WRC	2:57:00.6	0.0	25
2	5	(Belgium) Thierry Neuville	(Belgium) Nicolas Gilsoul	(South Korea) Hyundai Motorsport	Hyundai i20 Coupe WRC	WRC	2:57:37.9	+37.3	23
3	1	(France) Sébastien Ogier	(France) Julien Ingrassia	(United Kingdom) M-Sport World Rally Team	Ford Fiesta WRC	WRC	2:57:45.8	+45.2	17
4	6	(Norway) Andreas Mikkelsen	(Norway) Anders Jæger	(South Korea) Hyundai Motorsport	Hyundai i20 Coupe WRC	WRC	2:57:50.4	+49.8	13
5	10	(Finland) Jari-Matti Latvala	(Finland) Miikka Anttila	(Japan) Toyota Gazoo Racing WRT	Toyota Yaris WRC	WRC	2:57:50.9	+50.3	13
6	2	(Estonia) Ott Tänak	(Estonia) Martin Järveoja	(United Kingdom) M-Sport World Rally Team	Ford Fiesta WRC	WRC	2:58:02.9	+1:02.3	8
7	9	(United Kingdom) Kris Meeke	(Republic of Ireland) Paul Nagle	(France) Citroën Total Abu Dhabi WRT	Citroën C3 WRC	WRC	2:58:21.1	+1:20.5	10
8	4	(New Zealand) Hayden Paddon	(United Kingdom) Sebastian Marshall	(South Korea) Hyundai Motorsport	Hyundai i20 Coupe WRC	WRC	2:59:16.9	+2:16.3	4
9	12	(Finland) Esapekka Lappi	(Finland) Janne Ferm	(Japan) Toyota Gazoo Racing WRT	Toyota Yaris WRC	WRC	2:59:47.1	+2:46.5	2
10	16	(Spain) Dani Sordo	(Spain) Marc Martí	(South Korea) Hyundai Motorsport	Hyundai i20 Coupe WRC	WRC	3:00:51.1	+3:50.5	1
WRC-2 standings
1 (11.)	31	(Sweden) Pontus Tidemand	(Sweden) Jonas Andersson	(Czech Republic) Škoda Motorsport	Škoda Fabia R5	WRC-2	3:07:12.2	0.0	25
2 (12.)	32	(France) Eric Camilli	(France) Benjamin Veillas	(United Kingdom) M-Sport World Rally Team	Ford Fiesta R5	WRC-2	3:09:06.6	+1:54.4	18
3 (13.)	41	(United Kingdom) Tom Cave	(United Kingdom) James Morgan	(Slovakia) Styllex Motorsport	Ford Fiesta R5	WRC-2	3:09:15.5	+2:03.3	15

=== Special stages ===
Day	Stage	Name	Length	Winner	Car	Time	Rally Leader
Leg 1	SS1	Visit Conwy Tir Prince	1.49 km	(France) Sébastien Ogier	Ford Fiesta WRC	1:09.7	(France) Sébastien Ogier
Leg 1	SS2	Myherin 1	20.28 km	(United Kingdom) Elfyn Evans	Ford Fiesta WRC	11:01.6	(United Kingdom) Elfyn Evans
Leg 1	SS3	Sweet Lamb 1	4.24 km	(Estonia) Ott Tänak	Ford Fiesta WRC	2:44.4	(United Kingdom) Elfyn Evans
Leg 1	SS4	Hafren 1	35.14 km	(United Kingdom) Elfyn Evans	Ford Fiesta WRC	20:25.3	(United Kingdom) Elfyn Evans
Leg 1	SS5	Myherin 2	20.28 km	(United Kingdom) Elfyn Evans	Ford Fiesta WRC	10:52.3	(United Kingdom) Elfyn Evans
Leg 1	SS6	Sweet Lamb 2	4.24 km	(France) Sébastien Ogier	Ford Fiesta WRC	2:41.6	(United Kingdom) Elfyn Evans
Leg 1	SS7	Hafren 2	35.14 km	(Belgium) Thierry Neuville	Hyundai i20 Coupe WRC	20:22.3	(United Kingdom) Elfyn Evans
Leg 2	SS8	Aberhirnant 1	13.91 km	(United Kingdom) Elfyn Evans	Ford Fiesta WRC	7:30.2	(United Kingdom) Elfyn Evans
Leg 2	SS9	Dyfnant 1	17.91 km	(United Kingdom) Elfyn Evans	Ford Fiesta WRC	10:15.5	(United Kingdom) Elfyn Evans
Leg 2	SS10	Gartheiniog 1	12.61 km	(United Kingdom) Elfyn Evans	Ford Fiesta WRC	7:30.5	(United Kingdom) Elfyn Evans
Leg 2	SS11	Dyfi 1	25.86 km	(United Kingdom) Elfyn Evans	Ford Fiesta WRC	15:02.6	(United Kingdom) Elfyn Evans
Leg 2	SS12	Gartheiniog 2	12.61 km	(United Kingdom) Elfyn Evans	Ford Fiesta WRC	7:35.1	(United Kingdom) Elfyn Evans
Leg 2	SS13	Dyfi 2	25.86 km	(Belgium) Thierry Neuville	Hyundai i20 Coupe WRC	15:21.2	(United Kingdom) Elfyn Evans
Leg 2	SS14	Cholmondeley Castle	1.80 km	(Belgium) Thierry Neuville	Hyundai i20 Coupe WRC	1:07.5	(United Kingdom) Elfyn Evans
Leg 2	SS15	Aberhirnant 2	13.91 km	(Finland) Jari-Matti Latvala	Toyota Yaris WRC	7:58.0	(United Kingdom) Elfyn Evans
Leg 2	SS16	Dyfnant 2	17.91 km	(United Kingdom) Elfyn Evans	Ford Fiesta WRC	10:26.1	(United Kingdom) Elfyn Evans
Leg 3	SS17	Alwen 1	10.41 km	(Estonia) Ott Tänak	Ford Fiesta WRC	5:32.2	(United Kingdom) Elfyn Evans
Leg 3	SS18	Brenig 1	6.43 km	(Norway) Andreas Mikkelsen	Hyundai i20 Coupe WRC	4:04.0	(United Kingdom) Elfyn Evans
Leg 3	SS19	Gwydir	7.49 km	(Belgium) Thierry Neuville (Finland) Jari-Matti Latvala	Hyundai i20 Coupe WRC; Toyota Yaris WRC	4:51.1	(United Kingdom) Elfyn Evans
Leg 3	SS20	Alwen 2	10.41 km	(Norway) Andreas Mikkelsen	Hyundai i20 Coupe WRC	5:34.5	(United Kingdom) Elfyn Evans
Leg 3	SS21	Brenig 2 [Power Stage]	6.43 km	(Belgium) Thierry Neuville	Hyundai i20 Coupe WRC	4:01.2	(United Kingdom) Elfyn Evans

=== Power Stage ===
The Power Stage was a 6.43 km (4.0 mi) stage at the end of the rally.

Pos.	Driver	Co-driver	Car	Time	Diff.	Pts.
1	(Belgium) Thierry Neuville	(Belgium) Nicolas Gilsoul	Hyundai i20 Coupe WRC	4:01.2		5
2	(United Kingdom) Kris Meeke	(Republic of Ireland) Paul Nagle	Citroën C3 WRC	4:02.7	+1.5	4
3	(Finland) Jari-Matti Latvala	(Finland) Miikka Anttila	Toyota Yaris WRC	4:02.8	+1.6	3
4	(France) Sébastien Ogier	(France) Julien Ingrassia	Ford Fiesta WRC	4:03.1	+1.9	2
5	(Norway) Andreas Mikkelsen	(Norway) Anders Jæger	Hyundai i20 Coupe WRC	4:03.2	+2.0	1

=== Championship standings after the rally ===
- **Bold text** indicates 2017 World Champions.

Drivers' Championship standings

	Pos.	Driver	Points
	1	(France) **Sébastien Ogier**	215
1	2	(Belgium) Thierry Neuville	183
1	3	(Estonia) Ott Tänak	169
	4	(Finland) Jari-Matti Latvala	136
1	5	(United Kingdom) Elfyn Evans	118

Manufacturers' Championship standings

Pos.	Manufacturer	Points
1	(United Kingdom) **M-Sport World Rally Team**	398
2	(South Korea) Hyundai Motorsport	305
3	(Japan) Toyota Gazoo Racing WRT	241
4	(France) Citroën Total Abu Dhabi WRT	210
