= 2017 Rally Poland =

Motor rally competition

2017 Rally Poland 74th Rally Poland 2017
Round 8 of the 2017 World Rally Championship
← Previous event	Next event →
- Host country: Poland
- Rally base: (Poland) Mikołajki
- Dates run: 29 June – 2 July 2017
- Stages: 22 (318.74 km; 198.06 miles)
- Stage surface: Gravel

Statistics
- Crews: 49 at start, 40 at finish

Overall results
- Overall winner: (Belgium) Thierry Neuville (Belgium) Nicolas Gilsoul (South Korea) Hyundai Motorsport

The 2017 Rally Poland was the eighth round of the 2017 World Rally Championship and was the 74th running of the Rally Poland. Thierry Neuville and Nicolas Gilsoul won the rally.

Ole Christian Veiby won the WRC-2 category for the first time, with WRC-2 championship leader Pontus Tidemand finishing second.

== Entry list ==
Notable entrants
No.	Entrant	Class	Driver	Co-driver	Car	Tyre
1	(United Kingdom) M-Sport World Rally Team	WRC	(France) Sébastien Ogier	(France) Julien Ingrassia	Ford Fiesta WRC	M
2	(United Kingdom) M-Sport World Rally Team	WRC	(Estonia) Ott Tänak	(Estonia) Martin Järveoja	Ford Fiesta WRC	M
3	(United Kingdom) M-Sport World Rally Team	WRC	(United Kingdom) Elfyn Evans	(United Kingdom) Daniel Barritt	Ford Fiesta WRC	D
4	(South Korea) Hyundai Motorsport	WRC	(New Zealand) Hayden Paddon	(United Kingdom) Sebastian Marshall	Hyundai i20 Coupe WRC	M
5	(South Korea) Hyundai Motorsport	WRC	(Belgium) Thierry Neuville	(Belgium) Nicolas Gilsoul	Hyundai i20 Coupe WRC	M
6	(South Korea) Hyundai Motorsport	WRC	(Spain) Dani Sordo	(Spain) Marc Martí	Hyundai i20 Coupe WRC	M
7	(France) Citroën Total Abu Dhabi WRT	WRC	(Norway) Andreas Mikkelsen	(Norway) Anders Jæger	Citroën C3 WRC	M
8	(France) Citroën Total Abu Dhabi WRT	WRC	(Republic of Ireland) Craig Breen	(United Kingdom) Scott Martin	Citroën C3 WRC	M
9	(France) Citroën Total Abu Dhabi WRT	WRC	(France) Stéphane Lefebvre	(France) Gabin Moreau	Citroën C3 WRC	M
10	(Japan) Toyota Gazoo Racing WRT	WRC	(Finland) Jari-Matti Latvala	(Finland) Miikka Anttila	Toyota Yaris WRC	M
11	(Japan) Toyota Gazoo Racing WRT	WRC	(Finland) Juho Hänninen	(Finland) Kaj Lindström	Toyota Yaris WRC	M
12	(Japan) Toyota Gazoo Racing WRT	WRC	(Finland) Esapekka Lappi	(Finland) Janne Ferm	Toyota Yaris WRC	M
14	(United Kingdom) M-Sport World Rally Team	WRC	(Norway) Mads Østberg	(Norway) Ola Fløene	Ford Fiesta WRC	M
15	(United Kingdom) M-Sport World Rally Team	WRC	(Finland) Teemu Suninen	(Finland) Mikko Markkula	Ford Fiesta WRC	M
21	(Ukraine) Eurolamp World Rally Team	WRC	(Ukraine) Valeriy Gorban	(Estonia) Sergei Larens	Mini John Cooper Works WRC	M
22	(Greece) Jourdan Serderidis	WRC	(Greece) Jourdan Serderidis	(Belgium) Lara Vanneste	Citroën DS3 WRC	M
23	(France) Jean-Michel Raoux	WRC	(France) Jean-Michel Raoux	(France) Laurent Magat	Citroën DS3 WRC	D
31	(Czech Republic) Škoda Motorsport II	WRC-2	(Sweden) Pontus Tidemand	(Sweden) Jonas Andersson	Škoda Fabia R5	M
32	(Italy) Motorsport Italia srl	WRC-2	(Mexico) Benito Guerra Jr.	(Spain) Daniel Cué	Škoda Fabia R5	D
33	(Czech Republic) Gekon Racing	WRC-2	(Romania) Simone Tempestini	(Italy) Giovanni Bernacchini	Citroën DS3 R5	M
34	(Finland) Printsport	WRC-2	(Norway) Ole Christian Veiby	(Norway) Stig Rune Skjærmoen	Škoda Fabia R5	M
35	(United Kingdom) Gus Greensmith	WRC-2	(United Kingdom) Gus Greensmith	(United Kingdom) Craig Parry	Ford Fiesta R5	M
36	(Chile) Pedro Heller	WRC-2	(Chile) Pedro Heller	(Argentina) Pablo Olmos	Ford Fiesta R5	M
38	(Poland) Orlen Team	WRC-2	(Poland) Hubert Ptaszek	(Poland) Maciej Szczepaniak	Škoda Fabia R5	M
39	(Hungary) TRT Peugeot World Rally Team	WRC-2	(Poland) Łukasz Pieniążek	(Poland) Przemysław Mazur	Peugeot 208 T16 R5	M
40	(France) Quentin Gilbert	WRC-2	(France) Quentin Gilbert	(Belgium) Renaud Jamoul	Škoda Fabia R5	D
41	(Poland) C-Rally	WRC-2	(Poland) Jarosław Koltun	(Poland) Ireneusz Pleskot	Ford Fiesta R5	M
42	(Poland) Wojciech Chuchala	WRC-2	(Poland) Wojciech Chuchala	(Poland) Sebastian Rozwadowski	Ford Fiesta R5	P
43	(Italy) ACI Team Italia	WRC-2	(Italy) Fabio Andolfi	(Italy) Manuel Fenoli	Hyundai i20 R5	M
44	(France) Yoann Bonato	WRC-2	(France) Yoann Bonato	(France) Benjamin Boulloud	Citroën DS3 R5	M
45	(Estonia) Tehase Auto	WRC-2	(Estonia) Raul Jeets	(Estonia) Kuldar Sikk	Škoda Fabia R5	M
46	(United Kingdom) Drive DMACK Trophy Team	WRC-2	(United Kingdom) Osian Pryce	(United Kingdom) Dale Furniss	Ford Fiesta R5	D
61	(France) Raphaël Astier	WRC-3	(France) Raphaël Astier	(France) Frédéric Vauclare	Peugeot 208 R2	M
62	(Mexico) Name Rua Racing	WRC-3	(Mexico) Pancho Name	(Mexico) Armando Zapata	Citroën DS3 R3T	M
63	(Poland) Go+Cars Atlas Ward	WRC-3	(Poland) Jakub Brzeziński	(Poland) Robert Hundla	Citroën DS3 R3T	M
71	(Spain) Nil Solans	WRC-3; JWRC	(Spain) Nil Solans	(Spain) Miquel Ibáñez	Ford Fiesta R2	D
72	(France) Terry Folb	WRC-3; JWRC	(France) Terry Folb	(France) Christopher Guieu	Ford Fiesta R2	D
73	(Germany) ADAC Sachsen	WRC-3; JWRC	(Germany) Julius Tannert	(Austria) Jürgen Heigl	Ford Fiesta R2	D
74	(France) Nicolas Ciamin	WRC-3; JWRC	(France) Nicolas Ciamin	(France) Thibault de la Haye	Ford Fiesta R2	D
75	(Republic of Ireland) Robert Duggan	WRC-3; JWRC	(Republic of Ireland) Robert Duggan	(United Kingdom) Tom Woodburn	Ford Fiesta R2	D
76	(Estonia) Cueks Racing	WRC-3; JWRC	(Estonia) Miko-Ove Niinemäe	(Estonia) Martin Valter	Ford Fiesta R2	D
77	(United States) Dillon Van Way	WRC-3; JWRC	(United States) Dillon Van Way	(United Kingdom) Dai Roberts	Ford Fiesta R2	D
78	(Sweden) Dennis Rådström	WRC-3; JWRC	(Sweden) Dennis Rådström	(Sweden) Johan Johansson	Ford Fiesta R2	D
79	(Bolivia) Sebastian Careaga	WRC-3; JWRC	(Bolivia) Sebastian Careaga	(Spain) Rodrigo Sanjuan	Ford Fiesta R2	D
80	(Finland) Emil Lindholm	WRC-3; JWRC	(Finland) Emil Lindholm	(Finland) Tomi Tuominen	Ford Fiesta R2	D
91	(United Kingdom) M-Sport World Rally Team		(France) Eric Camilli	(France) Benjamin Veillas	Ford Fiesta R5	M
92	(France) Pierre-Louis Loubet		(France) Pierre-Louis Loubet	(France) Vincent Landais	Ford Fiesta R5	M
93	(Lithuania) Jonas Pipiras		(Lithuania) Jonas Pipiras	(Lithuania) Aisvydas Paliukenas	Ford Fiesta R2	M
94	(France) Alain Foulon		(France) Alain Foulon	(France) Gilles Delarche	Mitsubishi Lancer Evo X	M

Key
Icon	Class
WRC	WRC entries eligible to score manufacturer points
WRC	Major entry ineligible to score manufacturer points
WRC	Registered to score points in WRC Trophy
WRC-2	Registered to take part in WRC-2 championship
WRC-3	Registered to take part in WRC-3 championship
JWRC	Registered to take part in Junior World Rally championship

== Classification ==
=== Event standings ===
Pos.	No.	Driver	Co-driver	Team	Car	Class	Time	Difference	Points
Overall classification
1	5	(Belgium) Thierry Neuville	(Belgium) Nicolas Gilsoul	(South Korea) Hyundai Motorsport	Hyundai i20 Coupe WRC	WRC	2:40:46.1	0.0	26
2	4	(New Zealand) Hayden Paddon	(United Kingdom) Sebastian Marshall	(South Korea) Hyundai Motorsport	Hyundai i20 Coupe WRC	WRC	2:42:10.0	+1:23.9	18
3	1	(France) Sébastien Ogier	(France) Julien Ingrassia	(United Kingdom) M-Sport World Rally Team	Ford Fiesta WRC	WRC	2:43:06.9	+2:20.8	19
4	6	(Spain) Dani Sordo	(Spain) Marc Martí	(South Korea) Hyundai Motorsport	Hyundai i20 Coupe WRC	WRC	2:43:33.5	+2:47.4	12
5	9	(France) Stéphane Lefebvre	(France) Gabin Moreau	(France) Citroën Total Abu Dhabi WRT	Citroën C3 WRC	WRC	2:43:57.9	+3:11.8	12
6	15	(Finland) Teemu Suninen	(Finland) Mikko Markkula	(United Kingdom) M-Sport World Rally Team	Ford Fiesta WRC	WRC	2:44:02.9	+3:16.8	8
7	14	(Norway) Mads Østberg	(Norway) Ola Fløene	(United Kingdom) M-Sport World Rally Team	Ford Fiesta WRC	WRC	2:44:25.7	+3:39.6	6
8	3	(United Kingdom) Elfyn Evans	(United Kingdom) Daniel Barritt	(United Kingdom) M-Sport World Rally Team	Ford Fiesta WRC	WRC	2:45:25.2	+4:39.1	4
9	7	(Norway) Andreas Mikkelsen	(Norway) Anders Jæger	(France) Citroën Total Abu Dhabi WRT	Citroën C3 WRC	WRC	2:45:29.6	+4:43.5	5
10	11	(Finland) Juho Hänninen	(Finland) Kaj Lindström	(Japan) Toyota Gazoo Racing WRT	Toyota Yaris WRC	WRC	2:45:39.8	+4:53.7	1
20	10	(Finland) Jari-Matti Latvala	(Finland) Miikka Anttila	(Japan) Toyota Gazoo Racing WRT	Toyota Yaris WRC	WRC	3:08:47.1	+28:01.0	5
WRC-2 standings
1 (12.)	34	(Norway) Ole Christian Veiby	(Norway) Stig Rune Skjærmoen	(Finland) Printsport	Škoda Fabia R5	WRC-2	2:53:39.3		25
2 (13.)	31	(Sweden) Pontus Tidemand	(Sweden) Jonas Andersson	(Czech Republic) Škoda Motorsport II	Škoda Fabia R5	WRC-2	2:54:12.2	+32.9	18
3 (15.)	40	(France) Quentin Gilbert	(France) Renaud Jamoul	(France) Quentin Gilbert	Škoda Fabia R5	WRC-2	2:57:59.6	+4:20.3	15
4 (17.)	32	(Mexico) Benito Guerra Jr.	(Spain) Daniel Cué	(Italy) Motorsport Italia srl	Škoda Fabia R5	WRC-2	3:00:44.2	+7:04.9	12
5 (18.)	44	(France) Yoann Bonato	(France) Benjamin Boulloud	(France) Yoann Bonato	Citroën DS3 R5	WRC-2	3:01:02.2	+7:22.9	10
6 (19.)	42	(Poland) Wojciech Chuchała	(Poland) Sebastian Rozwadowski	(Poland) Wojciech Chuchała	Ford Fiesta R5	WRC-2	3:01:56.2	+8:16.9	8
7 (22.)	35	(United Kingdom) Gus Greensmith	(United Kingdom) Craig Parry	(United Kingdom) Gus Greensmith	Ford Fiesta R5	WRC-2	3:15:38.3	+21:59.0	6
8 (23.)	43	(Italy) Fabio Andolfi	(Italy) Manuel Fenoli	(Italy) ACI Team Italia	Hyundai i20 R5	WRC-2	3:15:58.2	+22:18.9	4
9 (32.)	36	(Chile) Pedro Heller	(Argentina) Pablo Olmos	(Chile) Pedro Heller	Ford Fiesta R5	WRC-2	3:29:50.0	+36:10.7	2
10 (36.)	33	(Romania) Simone Tempestini	(Italy) Giovanni Bernacchini	(Czech Republic) Gekon Racing	Citroën DS3 R5	WRC-2	3:52:33.7	+58:54.4	1

=== Special stages ===
Day	Stage	Name	Length	Winner	Car	Time	Rally Leader
Leg 1	SS1	SSS Mikołajki Arena 1	2.50 km	(United Kingdom) Elfyn Evans	Ford Fiesta WRC	1:44.4	(United Kingdom) Elfyn Evans
Leg 1	SS2	Chmielewo 1	6.52 km	(Belgium) Thierry Neuville	Hyundai i20 Coupe WRC	3:22.9	(Belgium) Thierry Neuville
Leg 1	SS3	Wieliczki 1	15.05 km	(Finland) Jari-Matti Latvala	Toyota Yaris WRC	7:33.0	(Finland) Jari-Matti Latvala
Leg 1	SS4	Świętajno 1	19.60 km	(Finland) Jari-Matti Latvala	Toyota Yaris WRC	9:47.3	(Finland) Jari-Matti Latvala
Leg 1	SS5	Stare Juchy 1	14.14 km	(Belgium) Thierry Neuville	Hyundai i20 Coupe WRC	6:54.8	(Finland) Jari-Matti Latvala
Leg 1	SS6	Chmielewo 2	6.52 km	Stage cancelled			
Leg 1	SS7	Wieliczki 2	15.05 km	(Finland) Teemu Suninen	Ford Fiesta WRC	7:47.9	(Finland) Jari-Matti Latvala
Leg 1	SS8	Świętajno 2	19.60 km	(Belgium) Thierry Neuville	Hyundai i20 Coupe WRC	10:03.3	(Estonia) Ott Tänak
Leg 1	SS9	Stare Juchy 2	13.50 km	(Belgium) Thierry Neuville	Hyundai i20 Coupe WRC	7:07.4	(Belgium) Thierry Neuville
Leg 1	SS10	SSS Mikołajki Arena 2	2.50 km	(United Kingdom) Elfyn Evans	Ford Fiesta WRC	1:44.3	(Belgium) Thierry Neuville
Leg 2	SS11	Baranowo 1	15.55 km	(Finland) Jari-Matti Latvala	Toyota Yaris WRC	8:02.2	(Belgium) Thierry Neuville
Leg 2	SS12	Pozezdrze 1	21.24 km	(Estonia) Ott Tänak	Ford Fiesta WRC	10:39.8	(Estonia) Ott Tänak
Leg 2	SS13	Gołdap 1	14.75 km	(New Zealand) Hayden Paddon	Hyundai i20 Coupe WRC	7:24.1	(Estonia) Ott Tänak
Leg 2	SS14	Kruklanki 1	19.58 km	(Belgium) Thierry Neuville	Hyundai i20 Coupe WRC	10:08.5	(Belgium) Thierry Neuville
Leg 2	SS15	Baranowo 2	15.55 km	(Belgium) Thierry Neuville	Hyundai i20 Coupe WRC	7:47.9	(Belgium) Thierry Neuville
Leg 2	SS16	Pozezdrze 2	21.24 km	(New Zealand) Hayden Paddon	Hyundai i20 Coupe WRC	10:23.4	(Estonia) Ott Tänak
Leg 2	SS17	Gołdap 2	14.75 km	(New Zealand) Hayden Paddon	Hyundai i20 Coupe WRC	7:20.8	(Estonia) Ott Tänak
Leg 2	SS18	Kruklanki 2	19.58 km	(Belgium) Thierry Neuville	Hyundai i20 Coupe WRC	10:02.1	(Belgium) Thierry Neuville
Leg 2	SS19	SSS Mikołajki Arena 3	2.50 km	(United Kingdom) Elfyn Evans	Ford Fiesta WRC	1:44.4	(Belgium) Thierry Neuville
Leg 3	SS20	Orzysz 1	11.15 km	(Estonia) Ott Tänak	Ford Fiesta WRC	6:10.3	(Estonia) Ott Tänak
Leg 3	SS21	Paprotki 1	18.68 km	(Belgium) Thierry Neuville	Hyundai i20 Coupe WRC	8:58.1	(Belgium) Thierry Neuville
Leg 3	SS22	Orzysz 2	11.15 km	(Belgium) Thierry Neuville	Hyundai i20 Coupe WRC	6:02.6	(Belgium) Thierry Neuville
Leg 3	SS23	Paprotki 2 [Power Stage]	18.68 km	(Finland) Jari-Matti Latvala	Toyota Yaris WRC	8:57.5	(Belgium) Thierry Neuville

=== Power Stage ===
The Power Stage was a 18.68 km (11.6 mi) stage at the end of the rally.

Pos.	Driver	Co-driver	Car	Time	Diff.	Pts.
1	(Finland) Jari-Matti Latvala	(Finland) Miikka Anttila	Toyota Yaris WRC	8:57.5		5
2	(France) Sébastien Ogier	(France) Julien Ingrassia	Ford Fiesta WRC	9:02.4	+4.9	4
3	(Norway) Andreas Mikkelsen	(Norway) Anders Jæger	Citroën C3 WRC	9:02.8	+5.3	3
4	(France) Stéphane Lefebvre	(France) Gabin Moreau	Citroën C3 WRC	9:03.8	+6.3	2
5	(Belgium) Thierry Neuville	(Belgium) Nicolas Gilsoul	Hyundai i20 Coupe WRC	9:03.9	+6.4	1

=== Championship standings after the rally ===
Drivers' Championship standings

	Pos.	Driver	Points
	1	(France) Sébastien Ogier	160
	2	(Belgium) Thierry Neuville	149
1	3	(Finland) Jari-Matti Latvala	112
1	4	(Estonia) Ott Tänak	108
	5	(Spain) Dani Sordo	82

Manufacturers' Championship standings

Pos.	Manufacturer	Points
1	(United Kingdom) M-Sport World Rally Team	259
2	(South Korea) Hyundai Motorsport	237
3	(Japan) Toyota Gazoo Racing WRT	153
4	(France) Citroën Total Abu Dhabi WRT	117
