= Paul Nagle =

Irish rally co-driver (born 1978)

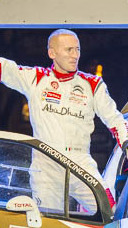

Personal information
- Nationality: (Republic of Ireland) Irish
- Born: 29 August 1978 (age 48); Killarney, Ireland

World Rally Championship record
- Years active: 2004, 2006–2009, 2011–2020
- Driver: (Republic of Ireland) Donie O'Sullivan (Republic of Ireland) Gareth MacHale (United Kingdom) Kris Meeke (United Kingdom) Barry Clark (Republic of Ireland) Craig Breen (Norway) Andreas Mikkelsen
- Teams: Munchi's Ford, Stobart Ford, Mini, Volkswagen, Citroën, Hyundai
- Rallies: 102
- Championships: 0
- Rally wins: 5
- Podiums: 18
- Stage wins: 94
- First rally: 2004 Rally Catalunya
- First win: 2015 Rally Argentina
- Last win: 2017 Rally Catalunya
- Last rally: 2022 Rally Catalunya

Paul Nagle (born 29 August 1978) is an Irish rally co-driver. Drivers with whom he has teamed include Kris Meeke, Gareth MacHale and Craig Breen.

== Career ==
Nagle was exposed to rallying from an early age, his father was an organiser for several rally events in Ireland including the Killarney Historic Rally.

Following his rally debut in 1997, Nagle's big break came in 2001 when he became the Peugeot Super Cup champion co-driver, gaining experience of competing in the UK and France in the process. He scored a fine sixth overall alongside Gareth MacHale in Mexico 2006 but a heavy crash in Sardinia the following season curtailed their WRC campaign.

Nagle has co-driven for Kris Meeke since 2009, but without a full-time WRC programme, he kept up his WRC experience by partnering other drivers including Craig Breen in 2012 and Andreas Mikkelsen in 2013. For 2014, Nagle and Meeke would be reunited for a full season at Citroën. After 2018, he was replaced by Sebastian Marshall.

== Rally victories ==
=== WRC victories ===
#	Event	Season	Driver	Car
1	35th Rally Argentina	2015	(United Kingdom) Kris Meeke	Citroën DS3 WRC
2	50º Rally de Portugal	2016	(United Kingdom) Kris Meeke	Citroën DS3 WRC
3	66th Rally Finland	2016	(United Kingdom) Kris Meeke	Citroën DS3 WRC
4	(Mexico) 31º Rally Guanajuato México	2017	(United Kingdom) Kris Meeke	Citroën C3 WRC
5	(Spain) 53º Rally RACC Catalunya – Costa Daurada	2017	(United Kingdom) Kris Meeke	Citroën C3 WRC

=== IRC victories ===
#	Event	Season	Driver	Car
1	(Brazil) 29. Rally Internacional de Curitiba	2009	(United Kingdom) Kris Meeke	Peugeot 207 S2000
2	(Portugal) 44. SATA Rallye Açores	2009	(United Kingdom) Kris Meeke	Peugeot 207 S2000
3	45. Belgium Ypres Westhoek Rally	2009	(United Kingdom) Kris Meeke	Peugeot 207 S2000
4	(Italy) 51° Rallye Sanremo	2009	(United Kingdom) Kris Meeke	Peugeot 207 S2000
5	(Brazil) 30. Rally Internacional de Curitiba	2010	(United Kingdom) Kris Meeke	Peugeot 207 S2000

== Rally results ==
=== WRC results ===
Year	Entrant	Car	1	2	3	4	5	6	7	8	9	10	11	12	13	14	15	16	WDC	Points
2004	Donie O'Sullivan	Ford Focus RS WRC 01	MON	SWE	MEX	NZL	CYP	GRE	TUR	ARG	FIN	GER	JPN	GBR	ITA	FRA	ESP; 20	AUS	NC	0
2006	Gareth MacHale	Ford Focus RS WRC 04	MON; 16	SWE	MEX; 6	ESP; Ret	FRA	ARG; 11	ITA; 11	GRE	GER; 10	FIN	JPN; Ret	CYP	TUR	AUS	NZL		22nd	3
2006	Gareth MacHale	Ford Focus RS WRC 03																GBR; Ret	22nd	3
2007	Gareth MacHale	Ford Focus RS WRC 03	MON; 11	SWE	NOR														NC	0
2007	Gareth MacHale	Ford Focus RS WRC 06				MEX; Ret	POR; 13	ARG	ITA; Ret	GRE	FIN	GER	NZL	ESP	FRA	JPN			NC	0
2007	Kris Meeke	Subaru Impreza WRC															IRE; Ret	GBR	NC	0
2008	Munchi's Ford World Rally Team	Ford Focus RS WRC 07	MON	SWE	MEX	ARG	JOR	ITA	GRE	TUR; 10	FIN	GER	NZL						NC	0
2008	Stobart VK Ford Rally Team	Ford Focus RS WRC 07													FRA; 10	JPN	GBR; 10		NC	0
2008	Interspeed Racing Team	Renault Clio R3												ESP; Ret					NC	0
2009	Gareth MacHale	Ford Focus RS WRC 04	IRE; Ret	NOR	CYP	POR	ARG	ITA	GRE	POL	FIN	AUS	ESP	GBR					NC	0
2011	Mini WRC Team	Mini John Cooper Works WRC	SWE	MEX	POR	JOR	ITA; Ret	ARG	GRE	FIN; Ret	GER; Ret	AUS	FRA; Ret	ESP; 5	GBR; 4				11th	25
2012	Craig Breen	Ford Fiesta S2000	MON; 14	SWE; 16	MEX	POR; Ret	ARG	GRE	NZL	FIN; Ret	GER	GBR; 13	FRA; 17	ITA	ESP; 6				18th	8
2013	Volkswagen Motorsport II	Volkswagen Polo R WRC	MON	SWE	MEX	POR	ARG	GRE	ITA	FIN	GER	AUS; 7	FRA; 7	ESP	GBR				13th	14
2014	Citroën Total Abu Dhabi WRT	Citroën DS3 WRC	MON; 3	SWE; 10	MEX; Ret	POR; Ret	ARG; 3	ITA; 18	POL; 7	FIN; 3	GER; Ret	AUS; 4	FRA; 3	ESP; 19	GBR; 6				7th	92
2015	Citroën Total Abu Dhabi WRT	Citroën DS3 WRC	MON; 10	SWE; 7	MEX; 16	ARG; 1	POR; 4	ITA; 24	POL; 7	FIN; 17	GER; 12	AUS; 3	FRA; 4	ESP; 5	GBR; 2				5th	112
2016	Abu Dhabi Total WRT	Citroën DS3 WRC	MON; Ret	SWE; 23	MEX	ARG	POR; 1	ITA	POL	FIN; 1	GER	CHN; C	FRA; 16	ESP; Ret	GBR; 5	AUS			9th	64
2017	Citroën Total Abu Dhabi WRT	Citroën C3 WRC	MON; Ret	SWE; 12	MEX; 1	FRA; Ret	ARG; Ret	POR; 18	ITA; Ret	POL	FIN; 8	GER; Ret	ESP; 1	GBR; 7	AUS; 7				7th	77
2018	Citroën Total Abu Dhabi WRT	Citroën C3 WRC	MON; 4	SWE; Ret	MEX; 3	FRA; 9	ARG; 7	POR; Ret	ITA; WD	FIN	GER	TUR	GBR	ESP	AUS				14th	43
2019	Hyundai Shell Mobis WRT	Hyundai i20 Coupe WRC	MON	SWE	MEX	FRA	ARG	CHL	POR	ITA	FIN; 7	GER	TUR	GBR; 8	ESP	AUS; C			15th	10
2020	Hyundai Shell Mobis WRT	Hyundai i20 Coupe WRC	MON	SWE; 7	MEX	EST; 2	TUR	ITA	MNZ										9th	25
2021	Hyundai Shell Mobis WRT	Hyundai i20 Coupe WRC	MON	ARC; 4	CRO; 8	POR	ITA	KEN	EST; 2	BEL; 2	GRE	FIN; 3	ESP	MNZ					6th	76
2022	M-Sport Ford WRT	Ford Puma Rally1	MON; 3	SWE; 36	CRO; 4	POR; 8	ITA; 2	KEN; 6	EST; 30	FIN; 32	BEL; 63	GRE; 5	NZL; 19	ESP; 9	JPN				7th	79
