= Citroën DS3 WRC =

Rally car

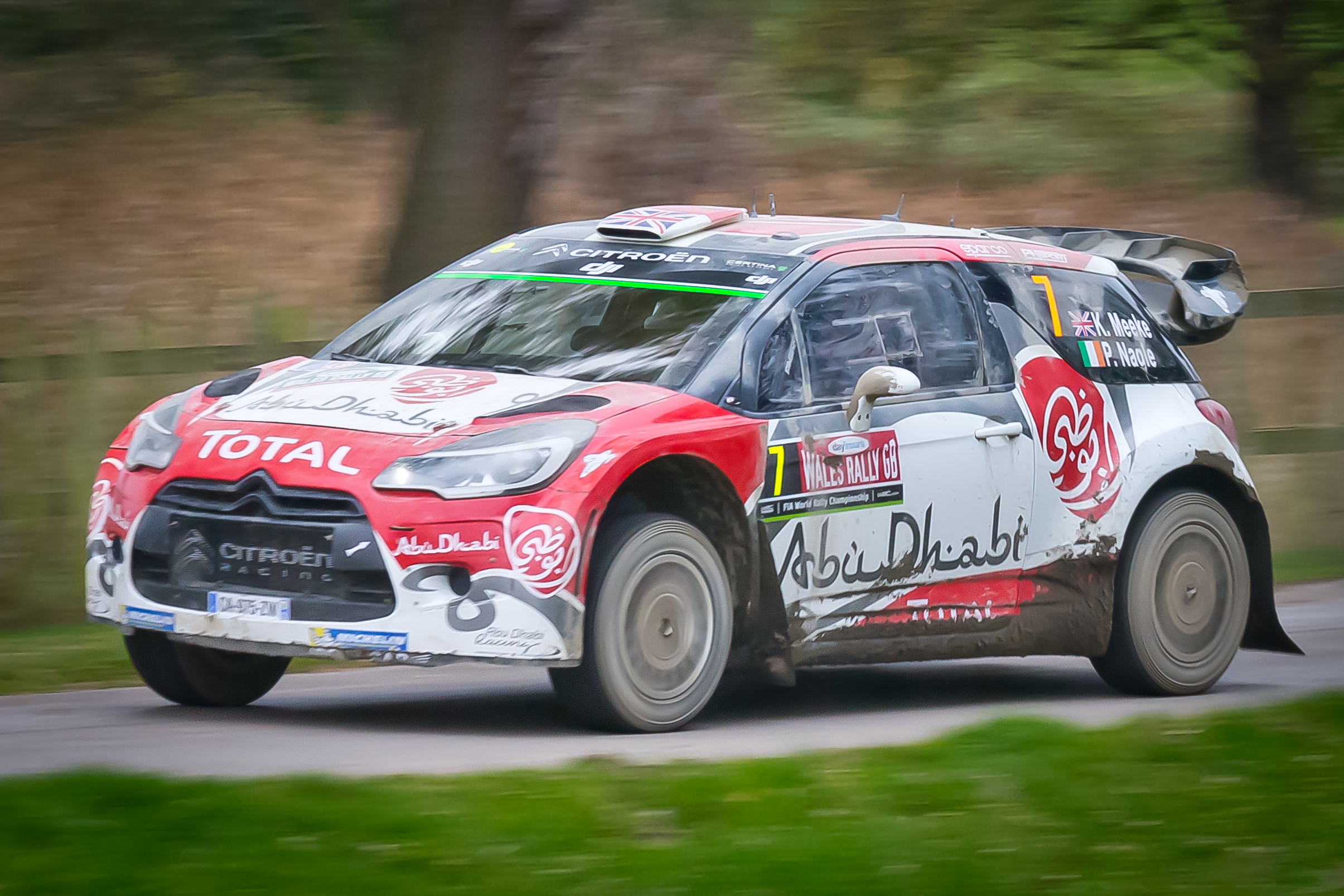
- Category: World Rally Car
- Constructor: Citroën Racing
- Designer: Xavier Mestelan-Pinon
- Predecessor: Citroën C4 WRC
- Successor: Citroën C3 WRC

Technical specifications
- Chassis: Reinforced body with welded, multi-point roll cage
- Suspension: MacPherson type
- Length: 3,948 mm (155.4 in)
- Width: 1,820 mm (71.7 in)
- Axle track: 1,618 mm (63.7 in)
- Wheelbase: 2,461 mm (96.9 in)
- Engine: Custom-built Citroën 1,598 cc (97.5 cu in) I4 turbocharged transversal
- Transmission: Sadev 6-speed sequential manual transmission Front and rear mechanical auto-locking differentials
- Power: 300 brake horsepower (220 kW) @ 6,000 rpm 350 newton-metres (260 lbf⋅ft) @ 3250 rpm
- Weight: 1,200 kg (2,645.5 lb)
- Fuel: Total
- Tyres: Michelin

Competition history (WRC)
- Notable entrants: (France) Citroën Total World Rally Team (France) Citroën Junior Team (Norway) Petter Solberg World Rally Team; Qatar World Rally Team
- Notable drivers: (United Kingdom) Kris Meeke (Norway) Mads Østberg (United Arab Emirates) Khalid Al Qassimi (France) Sébastien Loeb (Finland) Mikko Hirvonen (Spain) Dani Sordo (France) Sébastien Ogier (Finland) Kimi Räikkönen (Norway) Petter Solberg (Belgium) Thierry Neuville
- Debut: 2011 Rally Sweden
- First win: 2011 Rally Mexico
- Last win: 2016 Rally Finland
Wins	Titles
26	6
- Constructors' Championships: 2 (2011, 2012)
- Drivers' Championships: 2 (2011, 2012)

The Citroën DS3 WRC is the World Rally Car built for the Citroën World Rally Team by Citroën Racing for use from the 2011 World Rally Championship season. It is based upon the Citroën DS3 road car, and replaced the highly successful Citroën C4 WRC. It was built to the new World Rally Car regulations for 2011, which were based upon the existing Super 2000 regulations, but is powered by a turbocharged 1.6-litre engine rather than the normally aspirated 2-litre engine found in Super 2000 cars.

Development work on the car was carried out during 2010 by Citroën drivers Sébastien Loeb, Dani Sordo, Sébastien Ogier and test driver Philippe Bugalski, as well as sister Peugeot drivers Kris Meeke and Stéphane Sarrazin.

The engine has been specifically developed for this car (older regulations required that the engine be based on an existing mass-produced engine's cylinder block and head gasket). It officially develops 220 kW (300 hp) at 6,000 rpm and 350 N⋅m (36 kgf⋅m) at 3,250 rpm.

In October 2012, Citroën announced the DS3 RRC intended for use in the championships below that of the WRC: WRC-2 (formerly S-WRC), European Rally Championship (ERC), Middle East Rally Championship (MERC), some national championships and so on. Visually and internally, the two models (DS3 WRC and RRC) are different since the regulations are more restrictive on the RRC. For example, the WRC 1.6-litre turbocharged direct-injection engine has been slightly modified dropping the power from 220 kW (300 hp) to 205 kW (275 hp), visually the bumper intakes are smaller and the rear spoiler complies with the S2000 standards. The other significant change concerns the brakes in tarmac configuration: the diameter of the discs has been reduced from 355 to 350 mm and the water-cooling system has been removed.

At the 2016 Rally Finland, Kris Meeke established a new record for the fastest FIA WRC round in history, with a 126.60 km/h average speed.

== World Rally Championship results ==
=== WRC championship titles ===
Year	Title	Competitor	Entries	Wins	Podiums	Points
2011	FIA World Rally Championship for Drivers	(France) Sébastien Loeb	13	5	9	222
2011	FIA World Rally Championship for Co-Drivers	(Monaco) Daniel Elena	13	5	9	222
2011	FIA World Rally Championship for Manufacturers	(France) Citroën Total World Rally Team	26	10	18	403
2012	FIA World Rally Championship for Drivers	(France) Sébastien Loeb	13	9	10	270
2012	FIA World Rally Championship for Co-Drivers	(Monaco) Daniel Elena	13	9	10	270
2012	FIA World Rally Championship for Manufacturers	(France) Citroën Total World Rally Team	26	10	20	453

=== WRC victories ===
No.	Event	Season	Surface	Driver	Co-driver	Entrant
1	(Mexico) 2011 Rally México	2011	Gravel	(France) Sébastien Loeb	(Monaco) Daniel Elena	(France) Citroën Total World Rally Team
2	2011 Rally de Portugal	2011	Gravel	(France) Sébastien Ogier	(France) Julien Ingrassia	(France) Citroën Total World Rally Team
3	2011 Jordan Rally	2011	Gravel	(France) Sébastien Ogier	(France) Julien Ingrassia	(France) Citroën Total World Rally Team
4	(Italy) 2011 Rally Italia Sardegna	2011	Gravel	(France) Sébastien Loeb	(Monaco) Daniel Elena	(France) Citroën Total World Rally Team
5	2011 Rally Argentina	2011	Gravel	(France) Sébastien Loeb	(Monaco) Daniel Elena	(France) Citroën Total World Rally Team
6	(Greece) 2011 Acropolis Rally	2011	Gravel	(France) Sébastien Ogier	(France) Julien Ingrassia	(France) Citroën Total World Rally Team
7	2011 Rally Finland	2011	Gravel	(France) Sébastien Loeb	(Monaco) Daniel Elena	(France) Citroën Total World Rally Team
8	(Germany) 2011 Rallye Deutschland	2011	Tarmac	(France) Sébastien Ogier	(France) Julien Ingrassia	(France) Citroën Total World Rally Team
9	2011 Rallye de France	2011	Tarmac	(France) Sébastien Ogier	(France) Julien Ingrassia	(France) Citroën Total World Rally Team
10	(Spain) 2011 Rally Catalunya	2011	Tarmac/gravel	(France) Sébastien Loeb	(Monaco) Daniel Elena	(France) Citroën Total World Rally Team
11	(Monaco) 2012 Monte Carlo Rally	2012	Tarmac/snow	(France) Sébastien Loeb	(Monaco) Daniel Elena	(France) Citroën Total World Rally Team
12	(Mexico) 2012 Rally México	2012	Gravel	(France) Sébastien Loeb	(Monaco) Daniel Elena	(France) Citroën Total World Rally Team
13	2012 Rally Argentina	2012	Gravel	(France) Sébastien Loeb	(Monaco) Daniel Elena	(France) Citroën Total World Rally Team
14	(Greece) 2012 Acropolis Rally	2012	Gravel	(France) Sébastien Loeb	(Monaco) Daniel Elena	(France) Citroën Total World Rally Team
15	2012 Rally New Zealand	2012	Gravel	(France) Sébastien Loeb	(Monaco) Daniel Elena	(France) Citroën Total World Rally Team
16	2012 Rally Finland	2012	Gravel	(France) Sébastien Loeb	(Monaco) Daniel Elena	(France) Citroën Total World Rally Team
17	(Germany) 2012 Rallye Deutschland	2012	Tarmac	(France) Sébastien Loeb	(Monaco) Daniel Elena	(France) Citroën Total World Rally Team
18	2012 Rallye de France	2012	Tarmac	(France) Sébastien Loeb	(Monaco) Daniel Elena	(France) Citroën Total World Rally Team
19	(Italy) 2012 Rally Italia Sardegna	2012	Gravel	(Finland) Mikko Hirvonen	(Finland) Jarmo Lehtinen	(France) Citroën Total World Rally Team
20	(Spain) 2012 Rally Catalunya	2012	Tarmac/gravel	(France) Sébastien Loeb	(Monaco) Daniel Elena	(France) Citroën Total World Rally Team
21	(Monaco) 2013 Monte Carlo Rally	2013	Tarmac/snow	(France) Sébastien Loeb	(Monaco) Daniel Elena	(France) Citroën Total Abu Dhabi World Rally Team
22	2013 Rally Argentina	2013	Gravel	(France) Sébastien Loeb	(Monaco) Daniel Elena	(France) Citroën Total Abu Dhabi World Rally Team
23	(Germany) 2013 Rallye Deutschland	2013	Tarmac	(Spain) Dani Sordo	(Spain) Carlos del Barrio	(France) Citroën Total Abu Dhabi World Rally Team
24	2015 Rally Argentina	2015	Gravel	(United Kingdom) Kris Meeke	(Republic of Ireland) Paul Nagle	(France) Citroën Total Abu Dhabi World Rally Team
25	2016 Rally de Portugal	2016	Gravel	(United Kingdom) Kris Meeke	(Republic of Ireland) Paul Nagle	(France) Abu Dhabi Total World Rally Team
26	2016 Rally Finland	2016	Gravel	(United Kingdom) Kris Meeke	(Republic of Ireland) Paul Nagle	(France) Abu Dhabi Total World Rally Team

=== Complete WRC results ===
Year	Entrant	Driver	Rounds														Points	WCM pos.
Year	Entrant	Driver	1	2	3	4	5	6	7	8	9	10	11	12	13	14	Points	WCM pos.
2011	(France) Citroën Total World Rally Team	(France) Sébastien Loeb	SWE; 6	MEX; 1	POR; 2	JOR; 3	ITA; 1	ARG; 1	GRE; 2	FIN; 1	GER; 2	AUS; 10	FRA; Ret	ESP; 1	GBR; Ret		425	1st
2011	(France) Citroën Total World Rally Team	(France) Sébastien Ogier	SWE; 4	MEX; Ret	POR; 1	JOR; 1	ITA; 4	ARG; 3	GRE; 1	FIN; 3	GER; 1	AUS; 11	FRA; 1	ESP; Ret	GBR; 11		425	1st
2011	(Finland) ICE 1 Racing	(Finland) Kimi Räikkönen	SWE; 8	MEX	POR; 7	JOR; 6	ITA	ARG	GRE; 7	FIN; 9	GER; 6	AUS; WD	FRA; Ret	ESP; Ret	GBR; Ret		48	EX
2011	(Norway) Petter Solberg World Rally Team	(Norway) Petter Solberg	SWE; 5	MEX; 4	POR; 6	JOR; Ret	ITA; 3	ARG; 4	GRE; 4	FIN; 5	GER; 5	AUS; 3	FRA; EX	ESP; Ret	GBR; Ret		98	4th
2011	(Netherlands) Van Merksteijn Motorsport	(Netherlands) Peter van Merksteijn Jr.	SWE	MEX	POR; 22	JOR; Ret	ITA; Ret	ARG; Ret	GRE; Ret	FIN	GER; 9	AUS; 13	FRA; Ret	ESP; 17	GBR; Ret		16	9th
2011	(Netherlands) Van Merksteijn Motorsport	(Netherlands) Peter van Merksteijn Sr.	SWE	MEX	POR	JOR	ITA; Ret	ARG	GRE; Ret	FIN	GER	AUS	FRA	ESP	GBR		16	9th
2011	(France) Citroën Racing Technologies	(Russia) Evgeny Novikov	SWE	MEX	POR	JOR	ITA	ARG	GRE	FIN	GER	AUS	FRA	ESP; 7	GBR		–	–
2012	(France) Citroën Total World Rally Team	(France) Sébastien Loeb	MON; 1	SWE; 6	MEX; 1	POR; Ret	ARG; 1	GRE; 1	NZL; 1	FIN; 1	GER; 1	GBR; 2	FRA; 1	ITA; Ret	ESP; 1		453	1st
2012	(France) Citroën Total World Rally Team	(Finland) Mikko Hirvonen	MON; 4	SWE; 2	MEX; 2	POR; EX	ARG; 2	GRE; 2	NZL; 2	FIN; 2	GER; 3	GBR; 5	FRA; 3	ITA; 1	ESP; 3		453	1st
2012	(France) Citroën Junior World Rally Team	(Belgium) Thierry Neuville	MON; Ret	SWE; 12	MEX; 13	POR; 8	ARG; 5	GRE; 6	NZL	FIN; 16	GER; 12	GBR; 7	FRA; 4	ITA	ESP; 12		72	5th
2012	Qatar World Rally Team	(Qatar) Nasser Al-Attiyah	MON	SWE; 21	MEX; 6	POR; 4	ARG; 9	GRE; Ret	NZL	FIN	GER; 8	GBR; 10	FRA; Ret	ITA	ESP		71	6th
2012	Qatar World Rally Team	(Belgium) Thierry Neuville	MON	SWE	MEX	POR	ARG	GRE	NZL; 5	FIN	GER	GBR	FRA	ITA; 18	ESP		71	6th
2012	Qatar World Rally Team	(Australia) Chris Atkinson	MON	SWE	MEX	POR	ARG	GRE	NZL	FIN; 39	GER	GBR	FRA	ITA	ESP		71	6th
2012	Qatar World Rally Team	(Netherlands) Hans Weijs, Jr.	MON	SWE	MEX	POR	ARG	GRE	NZL	FIN	GER	GBR	FRA	ITA	ESP; Ret		71	6th
2012	(Netherlands) Van Merksteijn Motorsport	(Netherlands) Peter van Merksteijn Sr.	MON; Ret	SWE	MEX	POR	ARG	GRE	NZL	FIN	GER	GBR	FRA	ITA	ESP		–	–
2012	(Netherlands) Van Merksteijn Motorsport	(Netherlands) Peter van Merksteijn Jr.	MON	SWE; 19	MEX	POR; 10	ARG	GRE	NZL	FIN	GER; Ret	GBR	FRA	ITA	ESP		–	–
2012	Collectif Equipe de France Rallye	(France) Sébastien Chardonnet	MON	SWE	MEX	POR	ARG	GRE	NZL	FIN	GER	GBR	FRA; 10	ITA	ESP		–	–
2012	(France) PH Sport	(Italy) Luca Pedersoli	MON	SWE	MEX	POR	ARG	GRE	NZL	FIN	GER	GBR	FRA	ITA; 10	ESP		–	–
2013	(France) Citroën Total Abu Dhabi World Rally Team	(France) Sébastien Loeb	MON; 1	SWE; 2	MEX	POR	ARG; 1	GRE	ITA	FIN	GER	AUS	FRA; Ret	ESP	GBR		280	2nd
2013	(France) Citroën Total Abu Dhabi World Rally Team	(Finland) Mikko Hirvonen	MON; 4	SWE; 17	MEX; 2	POR; 2	ARG; 6	GRE; 8	ITA; Ret	FIN; 4	GER; 3	AUS; 3	FRA; 6	ESP; 3	GBR; Ret		280	2nd
2013	(France) Citroën Total Abu Dhabi World Rally Team	(Spain) Dani Sordo	MON	SWE	MEX; 4	POR; 12	ARG	GRE; 2	ITA; 4	FIN; 5	GER; 1	AUS	FRA	ESP; Ret	GBR; 7		280	2nd
2013	(France) Citroën Total Abu Dhabi World Rally Team	(United Kingdom) Kris Meeke	MON	SWE	MEX	POR	ARG	GRE	ITA	FIN	GER	AUS; Ret	FRA	ESP	GBR		280	2nd
2013	(France) Abu Dhabi Citroën Total World Rally Team	(Spain) Dani Sordo	MON; 3	SWE	MEX	POR	ARG; 9	GRE	ITA	FIN	GER	AUS	FRA; 2	ESP	GBR		63	6th
2013	(France) Abu Dhabi Citroën Total World Rally Team	(United Arab Emirates) Khalid Al Qassimi	MON	SWE; Ret	MEX	POR; 9	ARG	GRE; Ret	ITA; 10	FIN	GER; 11	AUS; 9	FRA	ESP; 11	GBR		63	6th
2013	(France) Abu Dhabi Citroën Total World Rally Team	(Australia) Chris Atkinson	MON	SWE	MEX; 6	POR	ARG	GRE	ITA	FIN	GER	AUS	FRA	ESP	GBR		63	6th
2013	(France) Abu Dhabi Citroën Total World Rally Team	(United Kingdom) Kris Meeke	MON	SWE	MEX	POR	ARG	GRE	ITA	FIN; Ret	GER	AUS	FRA	ESP	GBR		63	6th
2013	(France) Abu Dhabi Citroën Total World Rally Team	(Poland) Robert Kubica	MON	SWE	MEX	POR	ARG	GRE	ITA	FIN	GER	AUS	FRA	ESP	GBR; Ret		63	6th
2013	(France) Abu Dhabi Citroën Total World Rally Team	(Spain) Dani Sordo	MON	SWE; Ret	MEX	POR	ARG	GRE	ITA	FIN	GER	AUS	FRA	ESP	GBR		–	–
2013	(France) PH Sport	(France) Bryan Bouffier	MON; 5	SWE	MEX	POR	ARG	GRE	ITA	FIN	GER	AUS	FRA	ESP	GBR		–	–
2013	(France) PH Sport	(Mexico) Benito Guerra	MON	SWE	MEX; 8	POR	ARG	GRE	ITA	FIN	GER	AUS	FRA	ESP	GBR		–	–
2013	(France) PH Sport	(Czech Republic) Tomáš Kostka	MON	SWE	MEX	POR	ARG	GRE	ITA	FIN	GER	AUS	FRA; Ret	ESP	GBR		–	–
2014	(France) Citroën Total Abu Dhabi World Rally Team	(United Kingdom) Kris Meeke	MON; 3	SWE; 10	MEX; Ret	POR; Ret	ARG; 3	ITA; 18	POL; 7	FIN; 3	GER; Ret	AUS; 4	FRA; 3	ESP; 19	GBR; 6		210	2nd
2014	(France) Citroën Total Abu Dhabi World Rally Team	(Norway) Mads Østberg	MON; 4	SWE; 3	MEX; 9	POR; 3	ARG; Ret	ITA; 2	POL; Ret	FIN; Ret	GER; 6	AUS; 16	FRA; 7	ESP; 4	GBR; 3		210	2nd
2014	(France) Citroën Total Abu Dhabi World Rally Team	(United Arab Emirates) Khalid Al Qassimi	MON	SWE; 16	MEX	POR; 13	ARG	ITA; 10	POL	FIN	GER	AUS	FRA	ESP; 15	GBR		–	–
2014	(France) Armando Pereira	(France) Armando Pereira	MON	SWE	MEX	POR	ARG	ITA	POL	FIN	GER	AUS	FRA; Ret	ESP	GBR		–	–
2015	(France) Citroën Total Abu Dhabi World Rally Team	(United Kingdom) Kris Meeke	MON; 10	SWE; 7	MEX; 16	ARG; 1	POR; 4	ITA; 24	POL; 7	FIN; 17	GER; 12	AUS; 3	FRA; 4	ESP; 5	GBR; 2		230	2nd
2015	(France) Citroën Total Abu Dhabi World Rally Team	(France) Sébastien Loeb	MON; 8	SWE	MEX	ARG	POR	ITA	POL	FIN	GER	AUS	FRA	ESP	GBR		230	2nd
2015	(France) Citroën Total Abu Dhabi World Rally Team	(Norway) Mads Østberg	MON	SWE; 10	MEX; 2	ARG; 2	POR; 7	ITA; 5	POL; 9	FIN; 3	GER; 7	AUS; WD	FRA; 6	ESP; 4	GBR; 7		230	2nd
2015	(France) Citroën Total Abu Dhabi World Rally Team	(France) Stéphane Lefebvre	MON	SWE	MEX	ARG	POR	ITA	POL	FIN	GER	AUS; 13	FRA	ESP	GBR		230	2nd
2015	(France) Citroën Total Abu Dhabi World Rally Team	(Norway) Mads Østberg	MON; 4	SWE	MEX	ARG	POR	ITA	POL	FIN	GER	AUS	FRA	ESP	GBR		–	–
2015	(France) Citroën Total Abu Dhabi World Rally Team	(United Arab Emirates) Khalid Al Qassimi	MON	SWE	MEX	ARG; 6	POR; 24	ITA; 10	POL	FIN; 16	GER	AUS	FRA	ESP; 15	GBR		–	–
2015	(France) Citroën Total Abu Dhabi World Rally Team	(France) Stéphane Lefebvre	MON	SWE	MEX	ARG	POR	ITA	POL	FIN	GER; 10	AUS	FRA; 11	ESP	GBR; 8		–	–
2015	(France) PH Sport	(France) Sébastien Chardonnet	MON; 47	SWE	MEX	ARG	POR	ITA	POL	FIN	GER	AUS	FRA	ESP	GBR		–	–
2015	(France) PH Sport	(France) Stéphane Lefebvre	MON	SWE	MEX	ARG	POR	ITA	POL	FIN	GER	AUS	FRA	ESP; 50	GBR		–	–
2015	(Italy) D-Max Racing	(Ukraine) Yuriy Protasov	MON; 16	SWE	MEX	ARG	POR	ITA	POL	FIN	GER	AUS	FRA	ESP	GBR		–	–
2016	(France) Abu Dhabi Total World Rally Team	(United Kingdom) Kris Meeke	MON; Ret	SWE; 23	MEX	ARG	POR; 1	ITA	POL	FIN; 1	GER	CHN; C	FRA; 16	ESP; Ret	GBR; 5	AUS	–	–
2016	(France) Abu Dhabi Total World Rally Team	(France) Stéphane Lefebvre	MON; 5	SWE	MEX	ARG	POR; 35	ITA	POL; 9	FIN	GER; Ret	CHN; C	FRA	ESP	GBR; 9	AUS	–	–
2016	(France) Abu Dhabi Total World Rally Team	(Republic of Ireland) Craig Breen	MON	SWE; 8	MEX	ARG	POR	ITA	POL; 7	FIN; 3	GER	CHN; C	FRA; 5	ESP; 10	GBR; Ret	AUS	–	–
2016	(France) Abu Dhabi Total World Rally Team	(United Arab Emirates) Khalid Al Qassimi	MON	SWE; 19	MEX	ARG	POR; 26	ITA	POL	FIN; 16	GER	CHN; C	FRA	ESP; 12	GBR	AUS	–	–
2016	(France) Abu Dhabi Total World Rally Team	(Argentina) Marcos Ligato	MON	SWE	MEX	ARG; 7	POR	ITA	POL	FIN; 44	GER	CHN; C	FRA	ESP	GBR	AUS	–	–
2016	(France) Abu Dhabi Total World Rally Team	(Argentina) José Alberto Nicolas	MON	SWE	MEX	ARG; 18	POR	ITA	POL	FIN; Ret	GER	CHN; C	FRA	ESP	GBR	AUS	–	–
2016	(France) Abu Dhabi Total World Rally Team	(France) Quentin Gilbert	MON	SWE	MEX	ARG	POR	ITA	POL	FIN	GER	CHN; C	FRA	ESP	GBR; 17	AUS	–	–
2016	(Italy) D-Max Racing	(Italy) Felice Re	MON; 20	SWE	MEX	ARG	POR	ITA	POL	FIN	GER	CHN; C	FRA	ESP	GBR	AUS	–	–

== See also ==
- Citroën C3 WRC
- Ford Fiesta RS WRC
- Ford Fiesta WRC
- Hyundai i20 WRC
- Hyundai i20 Coupe WRC
- Mini John Cooper Works WRC
- Toyota Yaris WRC
- Volkswagen Polo R WRC

Awards
Preceded by Mini John Cooper Works WRC	Autosport Awards; Rally Car of the Year; 2012	Succeeded by Peugeot 208 T16 Pikes Peak
