= 2015 Rally México =

Rally car racing event held in Guanajuato, Mexico

2015 Rally México 29º Rally Guanajuato México
Round 3 of 13 of the 2015 World Rally Championship
| ← Previous event | Next event → |
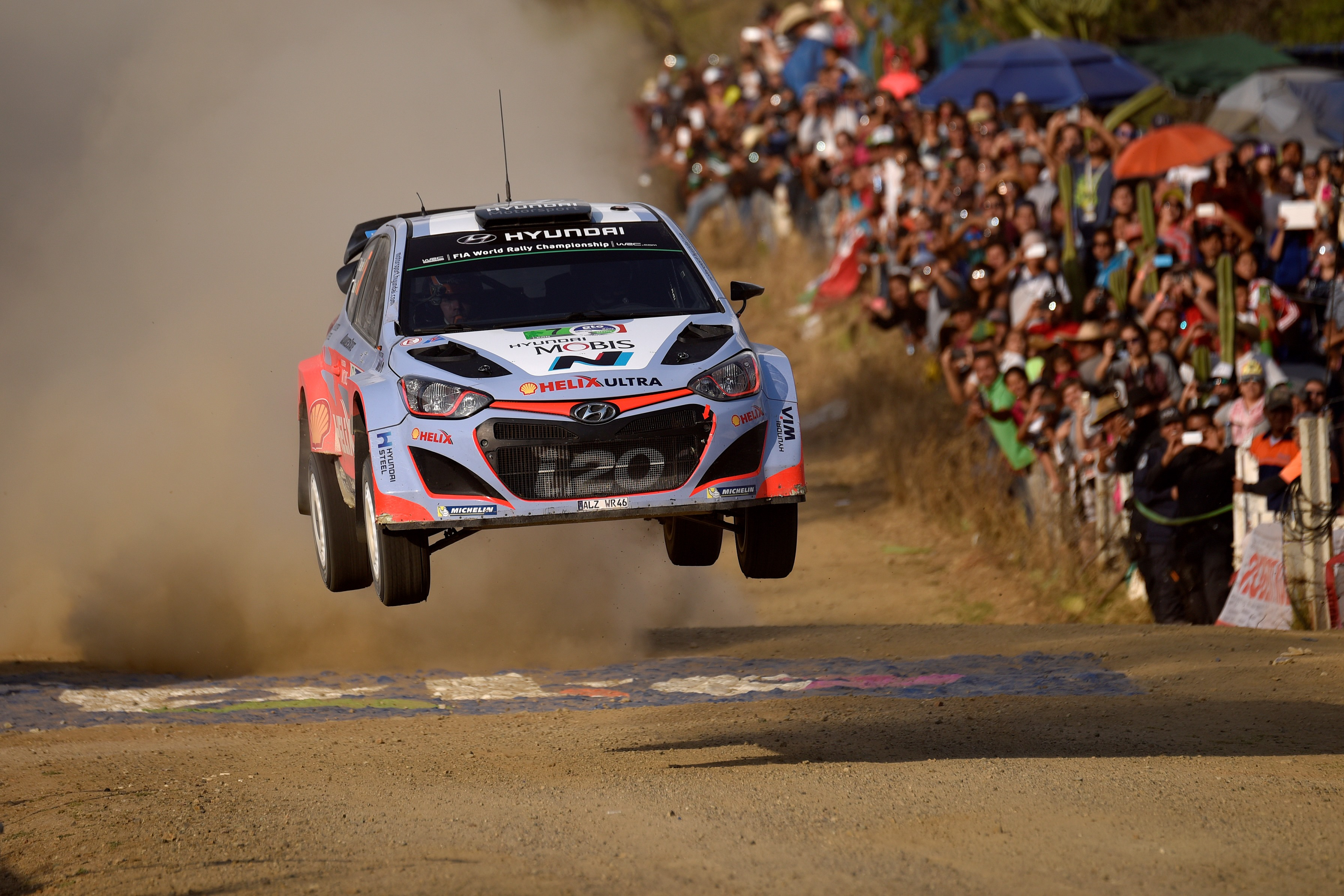
- Host country: Mexico
- Rally base: León
- Dates run: 5 – 8 March 2015
- Stages: 21 (394.21 km; 244.95 miles)
- Stage surface: Gravel

Statistics
- Crews: 30 at start, 23 at finish

Overall results
- Overall winner: (France) Sébastien Ogier (France) Julien Ingrassia (Germany) Volkswagen Motorsport

The 2015 Rally Guanajuato México was a motor racing event for rally cars that was held over four days between 5 and 8 March 2015. It marked the twenty-ninth running of the Rally Mexico, and was the third round of the 2015 World Rally Championship and WRC-2 seasons.

For the third year in succession, Volkswagen Motorsport driver Sébastien Ogier won the rally, taking his fifth consecutive WRC win in the process. Ogier finished almost a minute-and-a-half clear of his closest competitor, Citroën World Rally Team's Mads Østberg. The podium was completed by Ogier's team-mate Andreas Mikkelsen, who finished 6.3 seconds in arrears of Østberg. Nasser Al-Attiyah was the winner of the WRC-2 class, finishing almost eight minutes clear of anyone else, while also finishing in seventh place overall. Nicolás Fuchs (ninth overall) and Jari Ketomaa (tenth overall) completed the podium.

During the third stage of the rally, Los Mexicanos, Ott Tänak crashed his car into a lake, but he and co-driver Raigo Mõlder were able to extract themselves from the car prior to it submerging. The car was recovered from the lake, in anticipation for the car to be repaired by the M-Sport World Rally Team. The team attempted to repair the car, dubbed the TiTänak – a portmanteau of the RMS Titanic passenger liner, that sank in 1912, and Tänak's name – for the second day, but he was unable to start. He returned for Sunday's stages, finishing 22nd overall and scoring a manufacturers' championship point.

== Entry list ==
Notable entrants
| No. | Entrant | Class | Driver | Co-driver | Car | Tyre |
|---|---|---|---|---|---|---|
| 1 | (Germany) Volkswagen Motorsport | WRC | (France) Sébastien Ogier | (France) Julien Ingrassia | Volkswagen Polo R WRC | MI |
| 2 | (Germany) Volkswagen Motorsport | WRC | (Finland) Jari-Matti Latvala | (Finland) Miikka Anttila | Volkswagen Polo R WRC | MI |
| 3 | (France) Citroën Total Abu Dhabi WRT | WRC | (United Kingdom) Kris Meeke | (Republic of Ireland) Paul Nagle | Citroën DS3 WRC | MI |
| 4 | (France) Citroën Total Abu Dhabi WRT | WRC | (Norway) Mads Østberg | (Sweden) Jonas Andersson | Citroën DS3 WRC | MI |
| 5 | (United Kingdom) M-Sport Ltd | WRC | (United Kingdom) Elfyn Evans | (United Kingdom) Daniel Barritt | Ford Fiesta RS WRC | MI |
| 6 | (United Kingdom) M-Sport Ltd | WRC | (Estonia) Ott Tänak | (Estonia) Raigo Mőlder | Ford Fiesta RS WRC | MI |
| 7 | (Germany) Hyundai Motorsport | WRC | (Belgium) Thierry Neuville | (Belgium) Nicolas Gilsoul | Hyundai i20 WRC | MI |
| 8 | (Germany) Hyundai Motorsport | WRC | (Spain) Dani Sordo | (Spain) Marc Martí | Hyundai i20 WRC | MI |
| 9 | (Germany) Volkswagen Motorsport II | WRC | (Norway) Andreas Mikkelsen | (Norway) Ola Fløene | Volkswagen Polo R WRC | MI |
| 20 | (Germany) Hyundai Motorsport N | WRC | (New Zealand) Hayden Paddon | (New Zealand) John Kennard | Hyundai i20 WRC | MI |
| 21 | (Czech Republic) Jipocar Czech National Team | WRC | (Czech Republic) Martin Prokop | (Czech Republic) Michal Ernst | Ford Fiesta RS WRC | P |
| 23 | (Mexico) Benito Guerra, Jr. | WRC | (Mexico) Benito Guerra, Jr. | (Mexico) Borja Rozada | Ford Fiesta RS WRC | P |
| 24 | (Poland) Robert Kubica | WRC | (Poland) Robert Kubica | (Poland) Maciek Szczepaniak | Ford Fiesta RS WRC | P |
| 32 | (France) PH Sport | WRC-2 | (France) Stéphane Lefebvre | (Belgium) Stéphane Prévot | Citroën DS3 R5 | MI |
| 33 | (Italy) Motorsport Italia Srl | WRC-2 | (Italy) Massimiliano Rendina | (Italy) Mario Pizzuti | Mitsubishi Lancer Evolution X | P |
| 35 | (Greece) Jourdan Serderidis | WRC-2 | (Greece) Jourdan Serderidis | (Belgium) Frédéric Miclotte | Citroën DS3 R5 | DM |
| 36 | Youth & Sports Qatar Rally Team | WRC-2 | (Qatar) Abdulaziz Al-Kuwari | (United Kingdom) Marshall Clarke | Ford Fiesta RRC | MI |
| 37 | (Italy) FWRT s.r.l. | WRC | (Italy) Lorenzo Bertelli | (Italy) Giovanni Bernacchini | Ford Fiesta RS WRC | P |
| 38 | (Ukraine) Yuriy Protasov | WRC-2 | (Ukraine) Yuriy Protasov | (Ukraine) Pavlo Cherepin | Ford Fiesta RRC | P |
| 39 | (Qatar) Nasser Al-Attiyah | WRC-2 | (Qatar) Nasser Al-Attiyah | (France) Matthieu Baumel | Ford Fiesta WRC | MI |
| 40 | (United Kingdom) Drive DMACK | WRC-2 | (Finland) Jari Ketomaa | (Finland) Kaj Lindström | Ford Fiesta R5 | DM |
| 41 | (Peru) Nicolás Fuchs | WRC-2 | (Peru) Nicolás Fuchs | (Argentina) Fernando Mussano | Ford Fiesta R5 | DM |
| 42 | (Ukraine) Eurolamp World Rally Team | WRC-2 | (Ukraine) Valeriy Gorban | (Ukraine) Volodymyr Korsia | Mini John Cooper Works S2000 | P |
| 43 | (Russia) TAIF Rally Team | WRC-2 | (Russia) Radik Shaymiev | (Russia) Maxim Tsvetkov | Ford Fiesta R5 | MI |
| 51 | (Romania) Napoca Rally Academy | WRC-2 | (Italy) Simone Tempestini | (Italy) Matteo Chiarcossi | Subaru Impreza WRX STi | P |

| Icon | Class |
|---|---|
| WRC | WRC entries eligible to score manufacturer points |
| WRC | Major entry ineligible to score manufacturer points |
| WRC-2 | Registered to take part in WRC-2 championship |

== Results ==
=== Event standings ===
| Pos. | No. | Driver | Co-driver | Team | Car | Class | Time | Difference | Points |
Overall classification
| 1 | 1 | (France) Sébastien Ogier | (France) Julien Ingrassia | (Germany) Volkswagen Motorsport | Volkswagen Polo R WRC | WRC | 4:19:13.4 | 0.00 | 28 |
| 2 | 4 | (Norway) Mads Østberg | (Sweden) Jonas Andersson | (France) Citroën Total Abu Dhabi WRT | Citroën DS3 WRC | WRC | 4:20:32.2 | +1:18.8 | 18 |
| 3 | 9 | (Norway) Andreas Mikkelsen | (Norway) Ola Fløene | (Germany) Volkswagen Motorsport II | Volkswagen Polo R WRC | WRC | 4:20:38.5 | +1:25.1 | 17 |
| 4 | 5 | (United Kingdom) Elfyn Evans | (United Kingdom) Daniel Barritt | (United Kingdom) M-Sport World Rally Team | Ford Fiesta RS WRC | WRC | 4:22:53.6 | +3:40.2 | 12 |
| 5 | 8 | (Spain) Dani Sordo | (Spain) Marc Martí | (Germany) Hyundai Motorsport | Hyundai i20 WRC | WRC | 4:24:15.2 | +5:01.8 | 10 |
| 6 | 21 | (Czech Republic) Martin Prokop | (Czech Republic) Jan Tománek | (Czech Republic) Jipocar Czech National Team | Ford Fiesta RS WRC | WRC | 4:25:49.5 | +6:36.1 | 8 |
| 7 | 39 | (Qatar) Nasser Al-Attiyah | (France) Matthieu Baumel | (Qatar) Nasser Al-Attiyah | Ford Fiesta RRC | WRC-2 | 4:34:06.1 | +14:52.7 | 6 |
| 8 | 7 | (Belgium) Thierry Neuville | (Belgium) Nicolas Gilsoul | (Germany) Hyundai Motorsport | Hyundai i20 WRC | WRC | 4:41:56.7 | +22:43.3 | 5 |
| 9 | 41 | (Peru) Nicolás Fuchs | (Argentina) Fernando Mussano | (Peru) Nicolás Fuchs | Ford Fiesta R5 | WRC-2 | 4:42:02.4 | +22:49.0 | 2 |
| 10 | 40 | (Finland) Jari Ketomaa | (Finland) Kaj Lindström | (United Kingdom) Drive DMACK | Ford Fiesta R5 | WRC-2 | 4:42:23.6 | +23:10.2 | 1 |
WRC-2 standings
| 1 (7.) | 39 | (Qatar) Nasser Al-Attiyah | (France) Matthieu Baumel | (Qatar) Nasser Al-Attiyah | Ford Fiesta RRC | WRC-2 | 4:34:06.1 | 0.0 | 25 |
| 2 (9.) | 41 | (Peru) Nicolás Fuchs | (Argentina) Fernando Mussano | (Peru) Nicolás Fuchs | Ford Fiesta R5 | WRC-2 | 4:42:02.4 | +7:56.3 | 18 |
| 3 (10.) | 40 | (Finland) Jari Ketomaa | (Finland) Kaj Lindström | (United Kingdom) Drive DMACK | Ford Fiesta R5 | WRC-2 | 4:42:23.6 | +8:17.5 | 15 |
| 4 (11.) | 36 | (Qatar) Abdulaziz Al-Kuwari | (United Kingdom) Marshall Clarke | Youth & Sports Qatar Rally Team | Fod Fiesta RRC | WRC-2 | 4:42:58.2 | +8:52.1 | 12 |
| 5 (13.) | 38 | (Ukraine) Yuriy Protasov | (Ukraine) Pavlo Cherepin | (Ukraine) Yuriy Protasov | Ford Fiesta RRC | WRC-2 | 4:52:44.2 | +18:38.1 | 10 |
| 6 (14.) | 33 | (Italy) Massimiliano Rendina | (Italy) Mario Pizzuti | (Italy) Motorsport Italia Srl | Mitsubishi Lancer Evolution X | WRC-2 | 4:57:19.9 | +23:13.8 | 8 |
| 7 (19.) | 35 | (Greece) Jourdan Serderidis | (Belgium) Frédéric Miclotte | (Greece) Jourdan Serderidis | Citroën DS3 R5 | WRC-2 | 5:17:21.8 | +43:15.7 | 6 |

== Championship standings after the race ==
=== WRC ===
Drivers' Championship standings

| Pos. | Driver | Points |
|---|---|---|
| 1 | (France) Sébastien Ogier | 81 |
| 2 | (Norway) Andreas Mikkelsen | 47 |
| 3 | (Belgium) Thierry Neuville | 35 |
| 4 | (Norway) Mads Østberg | 32 |
| 5 | (United Kingdom) Elfyn Evans | 26 |

Manufacturers' Championship standings

| Pos. | Constructor | Points |
|---|---|---|
| 1 | (Germany) Volkswagen Motorsport | 99 |
| 2 | (Germany) Hyundai Motorsport | 75 |
| 3 | (United Kingdom) M-Sport World Rally Team | 48 |
| 4 | (France) Citroën Total Abu Dhabi WRT | 42 |
| 5 | (Czech Republic) Jipocar Czech National Team | 20 |

=== Other ===
WRC2 Drivers' Championship standings

| Pos. | Driver | Points |
|---|---|---|
| 1 | (Finland) Jari Ketomaa | 40 |
| 2 | (France) Stéphane Lefebvre | 25 |
| 3 | (Qatar) Nasser Al-Attiyah | 25 |
| 4 | (Republic of Ireland) Craig Breen | 18 |
| 5 | (Norway) Eyvind Brynildsen | 18 |

WRC3 Drivers' Championship standings

| Pos. | Driver | Points |
|---|---|---|
| 1 | (Norway) Ole Christian Veiby | 40 |
| 2 | (France) Quentin Gilbert | 25 |
| 3 | (Germany) Christian Riedemann | 18 |
| 4 | (Italy) Simone Tempestini | 12 |
| 5 | (France) Stéphane Consani | 10 |

JWRC Drivers' Championship standings

| Pos. | Driver | Points |
|---|---|---|
| 1 | (France) Quentin Gilbert | 25 |
| 2 | (Germany) Christian Riedemann | 18 |
| 3 | (Norway) Ole Christian Veiby | 15 |
| 4 | (Italy) Simone Tempestini | 12 |
| 5 | (France) Yohan Rossel | 10 |
