= 2015 Rally Sweden =

Motor racing event for rally cars

2015 Rally Sweden 63rd Rally Sweden
Round 2 of 13 of the 2015 World Rally Championship
← Previous event	Next event →
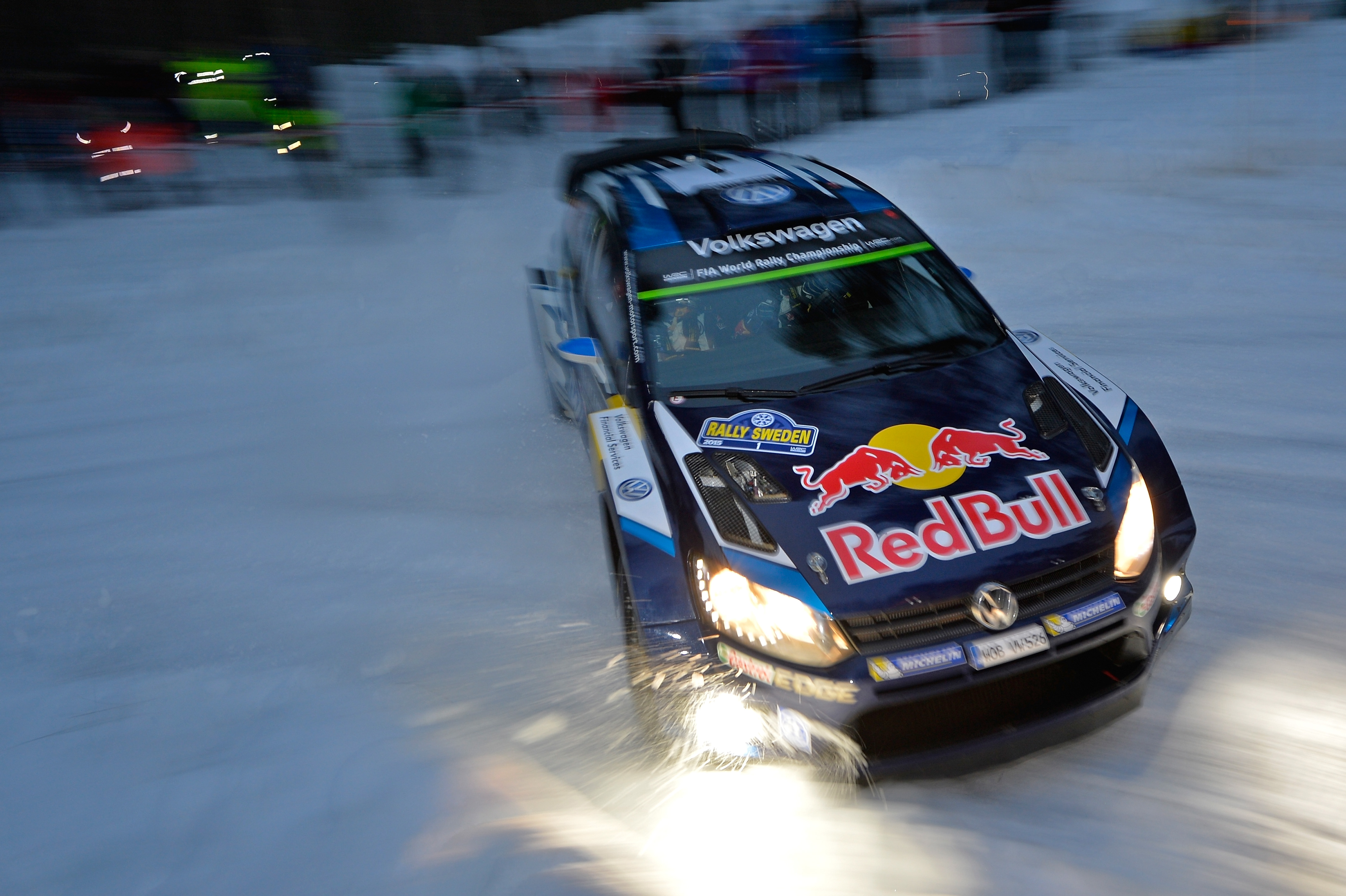
- Host country: Sweden
- Rally base: Hagfors, Värmland County
- Dates run: 12 – 15 February 2015
- Stages: 21 (308.00 km; 191.38 miles)
- Stage surface: Snow

Statistics
- Crews: 54 at start, 40 at finish

Overall results
- Overall winner: (France) Sébastien Ogier (France) Julien Ingrassia (Germany) Volkswagen Motorsport

The 2015 Rally Sweden was a motor racing event for rally cars that was held over four days between 12 and 15 February 2015. It marked the sixty-third running of the Rally Sweden, and was the second round of the 2015 World Rally Championship, WRC-2 and WRC-3 seasons.

Sébastien Ogier won the rally on the last stage to extend his lead in the drivers' championship. The rally started with Pontus Tidemand, competing in a WRC-2 Ford Fiesta RRC, winning the Thursday night super special stage in Karlstad. Ogier took the lead on Friday's opening stage, with teammate Jari-Matti Latvala chasing him for the lead. Volkswagen's third driver, Andreas Mikkelsen gained the lead on the ninth stage, after Ogier and Latvala both hit snow banks, dropping to 4th and 23rd respectively. Mikkelsen kept the lead until Saturday's final stage, where Hyundai's Thierry Neuville took the lead after fitting new tyres for the stage; Mikkelsen and Ogier were both in contention however, at deficits of 1.5 and 9.6 seconds respectively. Mikkelsen regained the lead on Sunday's opening stage, and held a three-second lead over Ogier ahead of the final stage, Värmullsåsen, which was also the event's power stage, offering additional drivers' championship points.

Running in reverse order to their rally positions, Ogier bested Neuville's time for the stage – ultimately, the stage's fastest time – and just after he completed the stage, Mikkelsen hit a snow bank and lost 40 seconds to fall behind Neuville in the standings as well. Ott Tänak finished fourth to record his best WRC result since 2012, while Hayden Paddon recorded his best WRC finish – replacing the injured Dani Sordo – in fifth position. Next in the order was British duo Elfyn Evans and Kris Meeke, Martin Prokop finished eighth ahead of Yuriy protasov, who took his first WRC stage win, on the Kirkenær stage. Completing the championship points was Mads Østberg, who was in position for a podium spot, until he hit a snow bank on the eleventh stage. He also scored an extra point by finishing third on the power stage. After the last stage, Volkswagen Motorsport decided to retire Latvala's car – he had managed to recover up the order to 12th place – due to a rules loophole in relation to the following event, Rally México.

== Entry list ==
No.	Driver	Co-driver	Entrant	Car	Cl.	Eligibility
1	(France) Sébastien Ogier	(France) Julien Ingrassia	(Germany) Volkswagen Motorsport	Volkswagen Polo R WRC	RC1	M
2	(Finland) Jari-Matti Latvala	(Finland) Miikka Anttila	(Germany) Volkswagen Motorsport	Volkswagen Polo R WRC	RC1	M
3	(United Kingdom) Kris Meeke	(Republic of Ireland) Paul Nagle	(France) Citroën Total Abu Dhabi World Rally Team	Citroën DS3 WRC	RC1	M
4	(Norway) Mads Østberg	(Sweden) Jonas Andersson	(France) Citroën Total Abu Dhabi World Rally Team	Citroën DS3 WRC	RC1	M
5	(United Kingdom) Elfyn Evans	(United Kingdom) Daniel Barritt	(United Kingdom) M-Sport World Rally Team	Ford Fiesta RS WRC	RC1	M
6	(Estonia) Ott Tänak	(Estonia) Raigo Mõlder	(United Kingdom) M-Sport World Rally Team	Ford Fiesta RS WRC	RC1	M
7	(Belgium) Thierry Neuville	(Belgium) Nicolas Gilsoul	(Germany) Hyundai Motorsport	Hyundai i20 WRC	RC1	M
8	(New Zealand) Hayden Paddon	(New Zealand) John Kennard	(Germany) Hyundai Motorsport	Hyundai i20 WRC	RC1	M
9	(Norway) Andreas Mikkelsen	(Norway) Ola Fløene	(Germany) Volkswagen Motorsport II	Volkswagen Polo R WRC	RC1	T
14	(Norway) Henning Solberg	(Austria) Ilka Minor	(Norway) Adapta Motorsport AS	Ford Fiesta RS WRC	RC1	
16	(Poland) Robert Kubica	(Poland) Maciej Szczepaniak	(Poland) Robert Kubica	Ford Fiesta RS WRC	RC1	
17	(Ukraine) Yuriy Protasov	(Ukraine) Pavlo Cherepin	(United Kingdom) M-Sport World Rally Team	Ford Fiesta RS WRC	RC1	
18	(Poland) Michał Sołowow	(Poland) Maciej Baran	(Poland) Synthos Cersanit Rally Team	Ford Fiesta RS WRC	RC1	
20	(Netherlands) Kevin Abbring	(United Kingdom) Sebastian Marshall	(Germany) Hyundai Motorsport N	Hyundai i20 WRC	RC1	T
21	(Czech Republic) Martin Prokop	(Czech Republic) Jan Tománek	(Czech Republic) Jipocar Czech National Team	Ford Fiesta RS WRC	RC1	T
31	(Saudi Arabia) Yazeed Al-Rajhi	(United Kingdom) Michael Orr	(Saudi Arabia) Yazeed Racing	Ford Fiesta RRC	RC2	WRC-2
32	(France) Stéphane Lefebvre	(Belgium) Stéphane Prévot	(France) PH Sport	Citroën DS3 R5	RC2	
33	(Italy) Max Rendina	(Italy) Mario Pizzuti	(Italy) Motorsport Italia s.r.l.	Mitsubishi Lancer Evolution X	RC2	WRC-2
36	(Sweden) Fredrik Åhlin	(Norway) Morten Erik Abrahamsen	(Sweden) Fredrik Åhlin	Ford Fiesta R5	RC2	WRC-2
37	(Italy) Lorenzo Bertelli	(Italy) Giovanni Bernacchini	(Italy) FWRT s.r.l.	Ford Fiesta RS WRC	RC1	T
38	(Norway) Anders Grøndal	(Norway) Roger Eilertsen	(Norway) Anders Grøndal	Citroën DS3 R5	RC2	WRC-2
39	(Sweden) Pontus Tidemand	(Sweden) Emil Axelsson	(Sweden) Pontus Tidemand	Ford Fiesta RRC	RC2	WRC-2
40	(Finland) Jari Ketomaa	(Finland) Kaj Lindström	(United Kingdom) Drive DMACK	Ford Fiesta R5	RC2	WRC-2
41	(Ukraine) Valeriy Gorban	(Ukraine) Volodymyr Korsia	(Ukraine) Eurolamp World Rally Team	Mini John Cooper Works S2000	RC2	WRC-2
42	(Ukraine) Oleksiy Kikireshko	(Estonia) Kuldar Sikk	(Ukraine) Eurolamp World Rally Team	Mini John Cooper Works S2000	RC2	WRC-2
43	(Russia) Radik Shaymiev	(Russia) Maxim Tsvetkov	(Russia) TAIF Rally Team	Ford Fiesta R5	RC2	WRC-2
44	(Poland) Jarosław Kołtun	(Poland) Ireneusz Pleskot	(Poland) C-Rally	Ford Fiesta R5	RC2	WRC-2
45	(Italy) Gianluca Linari	(Italy) Nicola Arena	(Italy) Gianluca Linari	Subaru Impreza WRX STi	RC2	WRC-2
53	(Norway) Ole Christian Veiby	(Norway) Anders Jæger	(Finland) Printsport	Citroën DS3 R3T	RC3	WRC-3
71	(Norway) Eyvind Brynildsen	(Sweden) Anders Fredriksson	(United Kingdom) Drive DMACK	Ford Fiesta RRC	RC2	WRC-2
72	(Sweden) Robin Friberg	(Sweden) Stefan Gustavsson	(Sweden) Robin Friberg	Citroën DS3 R5	RC2	
74	(Norway) Frank Tore Larsen	(Norway) Torstein Eriksen	(Norway) Frank Tore Larsen	Ford Fiesta R5	RC2	
75	(Sweden) Thomas Thunström	(Sweden) Jörgen Lindahl	(Sweden) Thomas Thunström	Citroën DS3 R5	RC2	

== Results ==
=== Event standings ===
Pos.	No.	Driver	Co-driver	Team	Car	Class	Time	Difference	Points
Overall classification
1	1	(France) Sébastien Ogier	(France) Julien Ingrassia	(Germany) Volkswagen Motorsport	Volkswagen Polo R WRC	WRC	2:55:30.5	0.0	28
2	7	(Belgium) Thierry Neuville	(Belgium) Nicolas Gilsoul	(Germany) Hyundai Motorsport	Hyundai i20 WRC	WRC	2:55:36.9	+6.4	20
3	9	(Norway) Andreas Mikkelsen	(Norway) Ola Fløene	(Germany) Volkswagen Motorsport II	Volkswagen Polo R WRC	WRC	2:56:10.3	+39.8	15
4	6	(Estonia) Ott Tänak	(Estonia) Raigo Mőlder	(United Kingdom) M-Sport World Rally Team	Ford Fiesta RS WRC	WRC	2:57:56.5	+2:26.0	12
5	8	(New Zealand) Hayden Paddon	(New Zealand) John Kennard	(Germany) Hyundai Motorsport	Hyundai i20 WRC	WRC	2:59:02.0	+3:31.5	10
6	5	(United Kingdom) Elfyn Evans	(United Kingdom) Daniel Barritt	(United Kingdom) M-Sport World Rally Team	Ford Fiesta RS WRC	WRC	2:59:23.5	+3:53.0	8
7	3	(United Kingdom) Kris Meeke	(Republic of Ireland) Paul Nagle	(France) Citroën Total Abu Dhabi WRT	Citroën DS3 WRC	WRC	2:59:36.3	+4:05.8	6
8	21	(Czech Republic) Martin Prokop	(Czech Republic) Jan Tománek	(Czech Republic) Jipocar Czech National Team	Ford Fiesta RS WRC	WRC	2:59:56.5	+4:26.0	4
9	17	(Ukraine) Yuriy Protasov	(Ukraine) Pavlo Cherepin	(United Kingdom) M-Sport World Rally Team	Ford Fiesta RS WRC	WRC	3:01:02.7	+5:32.2	2
10	4	(Norway) Mads Østberg	(Sweden) Jonas Andersson	(France) Citroën Total Abu Dhabi WRT	Citroën DS3 WRC	WRC	3:02:21.4	+6:50.9	2
WRC-2 standings
1 (13.)	40	(Finland) Jari Ketomaa	(Finland) Kaj Lindström	(United Kingdom) Drive DMACK	Ford Fiesta R5	WRC-2	3:05:07.4	0.0	25
2 (14.)	71	(Norway) Eyvind Brynildsen	(Sweden) Anders Fredriksson	(United Kingdom) Drive DMACK	Ford Fiesta RRC	WRC-2	3:04:40.0	+32.6	18
3 (15.)	41	(Ukraine) Valeriy Gorban	(Ukraine) Volodymyr Korsia	(Ukraine) Eurolamp World Rally Team	Mini John Cooper Works S2000	WRC-2	3:08:34.8	+3:27.4	15
4 (16.)	31	(Saudi Arabia) Yazeed Al-Rajhi	(United Kingdom) Michael Orr	(Saudi Arabia) Yazeed Racing	Ford Fiesta RRC	WRC-2	3:08:47.6	+2:40.2	12
5 (17.)	39	(Sweden) Pontus Tidemand	(Sweden) Emil Axelsson	(Sweden) Pontus Tidemand	Ford Fiesta RRC	WRC-2	3:08:50.9	+3:43.5	10
6 (18.)	36	(Sweden) Fredrik Åhlin	(Norway) Morten Erik Abrahamsen	(Sweden) Fredrik Åhlin	Ford Fiesta R5	WRC-2	3:09:42.0	+4:34.6	8
7 (23.)	44	(Poland) Jaroslaw Koltun	(Poland) Ireneusz Pleskot	(Poland) C-Rally	Ford Fiesta R5	WRC-2	3:17:26.5	+12:19.1	6
8 (24.)	42	(Ukraine) Oleksiy Kikireshko	(Estonia) Kuldar Sikk	(Ukraine) Eurolamp World Rally Team	Mini John Cooper Works S2000	WRC-2	3:19:33.1	+14:25.7	4
9 (25.)	81	(Italy) Simone Tempestini	(Italy) Matteo Chiarcossi	(Romania) Napoca Rally Academy	Subaru Impreza WRX STi	WRC-2	3:23:58.0	+18:50.6	2
10 (26.)	38	(Norway) Anders Grøndal	(Norway) Roger Eilertsen	(Norway) Anders Grøndal	Citroën DS3 R5	WRC-2	3:26:54.4	+21:47.0	1
WRC-3 standings
1 (21.)	53	(Norway) Ole Christian Veiby	(Norway) Anders Jæger	(Finland) Printsport	Citroën DS3 R3T	WRC-3	3:16:03.5	0.0	25

== Special stages ==
Day	Stage number	Stage name	Length	Stage winner	Car No.	Team	Time	Avg. spd.	Rally leader
12 Feb	SS1	(Sweden) Karlstad Super-Special 1	1.90 km	(Sweden) Pontus Tidemand (Sweden) Emil Axelsson	39	(Sweden) Pontus Tidemand	1:32.1	74.27 km/h	(Sweden) Pontus Tidemand (Sweden) Emil Axelsson
13 Feb	SS2	(Sweden) Torsby 1	14.76 km	(France) Sébastien Ogier (France) Julien Ingrassia	1	(Germany) Volkswagen Motorsport	8:36.6	102.86 km/h	(France) Sébastien Ogier (France) Julien Ingrassia
13 Feb	SS3	(Sweden) / Röjden 1^{1}; (Norway) / Röjden 1^{1}	18.73 km	(France) Sébastien Ogier (France) Julien Ingrassia	1	(Germany) Volkswagen Motorsport	9:59.4	112.49 km/h	(France) Sébastien Ogier (France) Julien Ingrassia
13 Feb	SS4	(Norway) Finnskogen 1	20.76 km	(Finland) Jari-Matti Latvala (Finland) Miikka Anttila	2	(Germany) Volkswagen Motorsport	11:03.1	112.71 km/h	(France) Sébastien Ogier (France) Julien Ingrassia
13 Feb	SS5	(Norway) Kirkenær 1	7.07 km	(France) Sébastien Ogier (France) Julien Ingrassia	1	(Germany) Volkswagen Motorsport	5:26.7	77.91 km/h	(France) Sébastien Ogier (France) Julien Ingrassia
13 Feb	SS6	(Norway) Kirkenær 2	7.07 km	(Ukraine) Yuriy Protasov (Ukraine) Pavlo Cherepin	17	(United Kingdom) M-Sport World Rally Team	5:34.4	76.11 km/h	(France) Sébastien Ogier (France) Julien Ingrassia
13 Feb	SS7	(Norway) Finnskogen 2	20.76 km	(Finland) Jari-Matti Latvala (Finland) Miikka Anttila	2	(Germany) Volkswagen Motorsport	11:04.3	112.50 km/h	(France) Sébastien Ogier (France) Julien Ingrassia
13 Feb	SS8	(Sweden) / Röjden 2^{1}; (Norway) / Röjden 2^{1}	18.73 km	(Norway) Andreas Mikkelsen (Norway) Ola Fløene	9	(Germany) Volkswagen Motorsport II	10:01.1	112.17 km/h	(France) Sébastien Ogier (France) Julien Ingrassia
13 Feb	SS9	(Sweden) Torsby 2	14.76 km	(Belgium) Thierry Neuville (Belgium) Nicolas Gilsoul	7	(Germany) Hyundai Motorsport	8:40.4	102.11 km/h	(Norway) Andreas Mikkelsen (Norway) Ola Fløene
13 Feb	SS10	(Sweden) Karlstad Super-Special 2	1.90 km	(France) Sébastien Ogier (France) Julien Ingrassia	1	(Germany) Volkswagen Motorsport	1:34.5	72.38 km/h	(Norway) Andreas Mikkelsen (Norway) Ola Fløene
15 Feb	SS11	(Sweden) Fredriksberg 1	18.15 km	(Norway) Andreas Mikkelsen (Norway) Ola Fløene	9	(Germany) Volkswagen Motorsport II	10:33.9	103.08 km/h	(Norway) Andreas Mikkelsen (Norway) Ola Fløene
15 Feb	SS12	(Sweden) Rämmen 1	22.76 km	(France) Sébastien Ogier (France) Julien Ingrassia	1	(Germany) Volkswagen Motorsport	11:36.5	117.64 km/h	(Norway) Andreas Mikkelsen (Norway) Ola Fløene
15 Feb	SS13	(Sweden) Hagfors Sprint 1	1.87 km	(France) Sébastien Ogier (France) Julien Ingrassia	1	(Germany) Volkswagen Motorsport	1:51.2	60.54 km/h	(Norway) Andreas Mikkelsen (Norway) Ola Fløene
15 Feb	SS14	(Sweden) Vargåsen 1	24.63 km	(France) Sébastien Ogier (France) Julien Ingrassia	1	(Germany) Volkswagen Motorsport	13:34.1	108.92 km/h	(Norway) Andreas Mikkelsen (Norway) Ola Fløene
15 Feb	SS15	(Sweden) Fredriksberg 2	18.15 km	(Belgium) Thierry Neuville (Belgium) Nicolas Gilsoul	7	(Germany) Hyundai Motorsport	10:27.6	104.11 km/h	(Norway) Andreas Mikkelsen (Norway) Ola Fløene
15 Feb	SS16	(Sweden) Rämmen 2	22.76 km	(United Kingdom) Kris Meeke (Republic of Ireland) Paul Nagle	3	(France) Citroën Total Abu Dhabi World Rally Team	11:38.5	117.30 km/h	(Norway) Andreas Mikkelsen (Norway) Ola Fløene
15 Feb	SS17	(Sweden) Hagfors Sprint 1	1.87 km	(Poland) Robert Kubica (Poland) Maciek Szczepaniak	16	(Poland) Robert Kubica	1:57.1	57.49 km/h	(Norway) Andreas Mikkelsen (Norway) Ola Fløene
15 Feb	SS18	(Sweden) Vargåsen 2	24.63 km	(Belgium) Thierry Neuville (Belgium) Nicolas Gilsoul	7	(Germany) Hyundai Motorsport	13:24.4	110.23 km/h	(Belgium) Thierry Neuville (Belgium) Nicolas Gilsoul
15 Feb	SS19	(Sweden) Lesjöfors	15.00 km	(France) Sébastien Ogier (France) Julien Ingrassia	1	(Germany) Volkswagen Motorsport	9:05.8	98.94 km/h	(Norway) Andreas Mikkelsen (Norway) Ola Fløene
15 Feb	SS20	(Sweden) Värmullsåsen 1	15.87 km	(Finland) Jari-Matti Latvala (Finland) Miikka Anttila	2	(Germany) Volkswagen Motorsport	8:14.1	115.63 km/h	(Norway) Andreas Mikkelsen (Norway) Ola Fløene
15 Feb	SS21	(Sweden) Värmullsåsen 2 (Power stage)	15.87 km	(France) Sébastien Ogier (France) Julien Ingrassia	1	(Germany) Volkswagen Motorsport	8:05.6	117.65 km/h	(France) Sébastien Ogier (France) Julien Ingrassia

Notes:

- ^1 — The Röjden stage started in Sweden and finished in Norway after crossing the Sweden-Norway border.

=== Power Stage ===
The "Power stage" was the second running of the 15.87 km (9.86 mi) Värmullsåsen stage at the end of the rally, which awarded championship points to the fastest three drivers through the stage.

Pos.	Driver	Car	Time	Diff.	Pts
1	(France) Sébastien Ogier	Volkswagen Polo R WRC	8:05.6	0.0	3
2	(Belgium) Thierry Neuville	Hyundai i20 WRC	8:10.4	+4.8	2
3	(Norway) Mads Østberg	Citroën DS3 WRC	8:15.5	+9.9	1
