= 2015 Rally de Portugal =

Fifth round of the 2015 World Rally Championship season

2015 Rally de Portugal 49º Rally de Portugal
Round 5 of the 2015 World Rally Championship season
← Previous event	Next event →
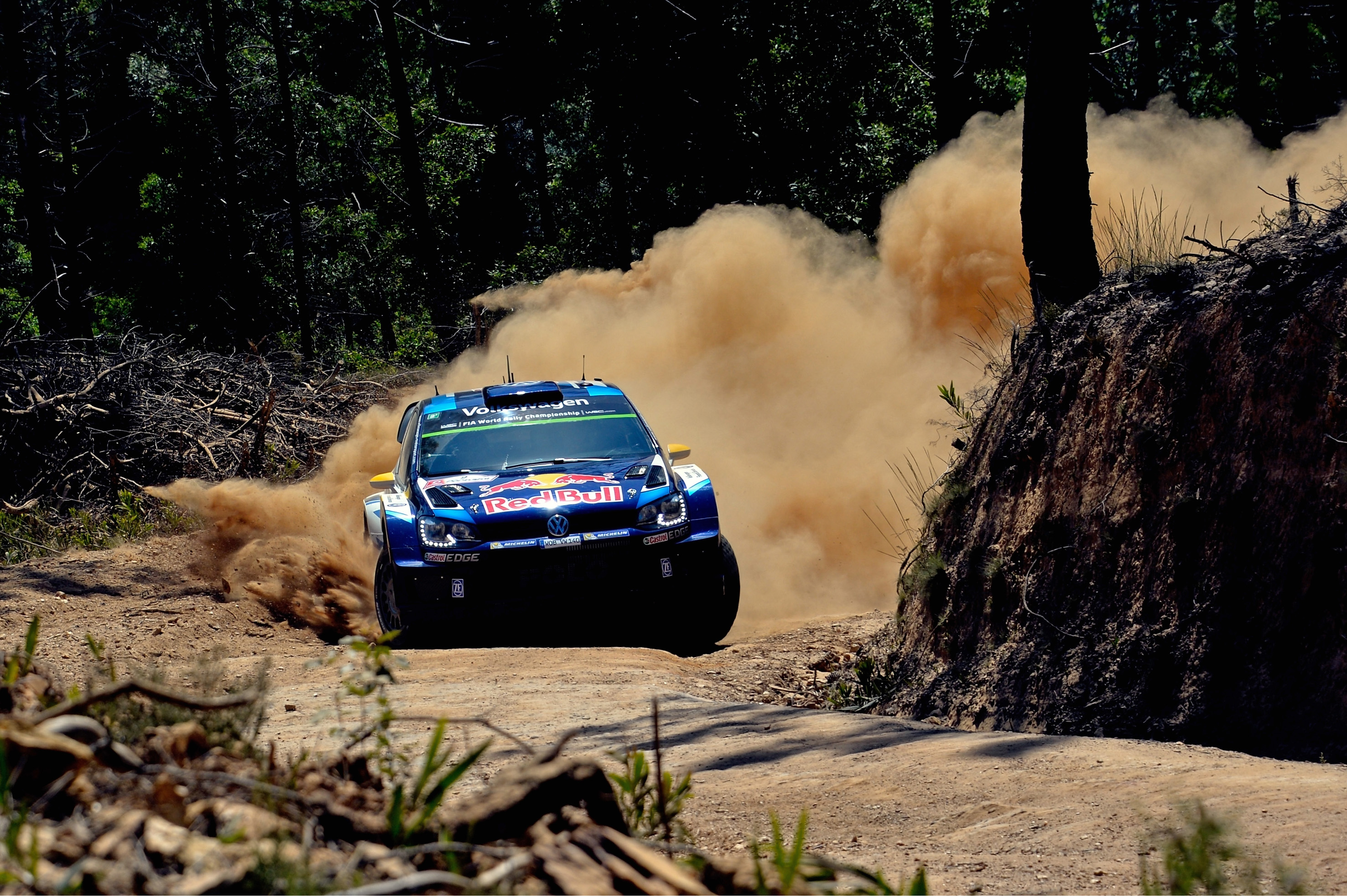
- Host country: Portugal
- Rally base: Matosinhos, Portugal
- Dates run: 21 – 24 May 2015
- Stages: 16 (351.71 km; 218.54 miles)
- Stage surface: Gravel
- Overall distance: 1,529.43 km (950.34 miles)

Statistics
- Crews: 94 at start, 64 at finish

Overall results
- Overall winner: (Finland) Jari-Matti Latvala (Finland) Miikka Anttila (Germany) Volkswagen Motorsport

The 2015 Rally de Portugal was the fifth round of the 2015 World Rally Championship season. For the first time since 2001, the Rally de Portugal returned to the north of Portugal, returning to the stage sections that earned the rally the world's best award 6 times, and large crowds lined the stages.

Jari-Matti Latvala won the Rally de Portugal for the first time, taking his first victory of the 2015 season.

== Entry list ==
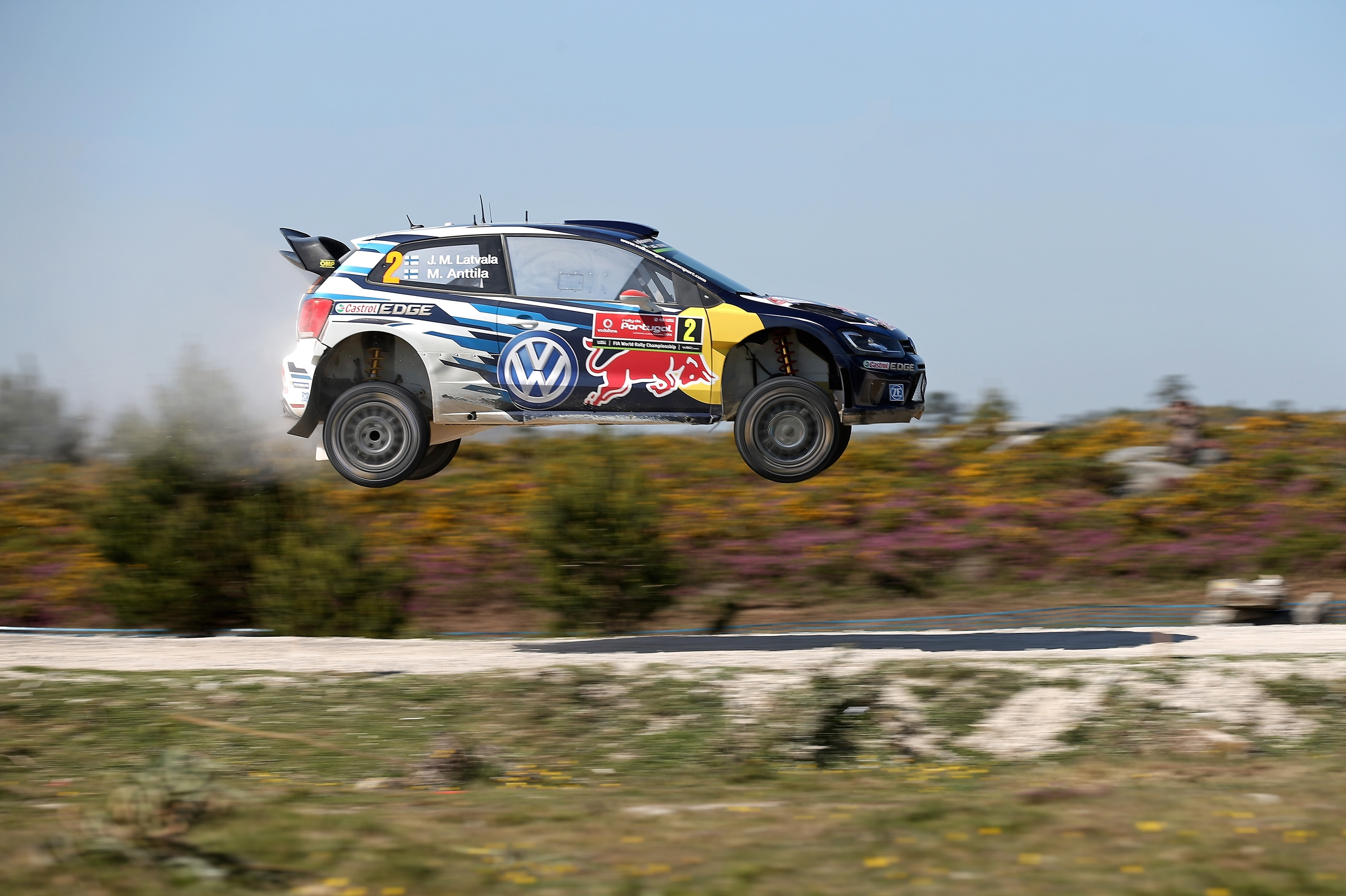
Jari-Matti Latvala at 2015 Rally de Portugal

Notable entrants
No.	Entrant	Class	Driver	Co-driver	Car	Tyre
1	(Germany) Volkswagen Motorsport	WRC	(France) Sébastien Ogier	(France) Julien Ingrassia	Volkswagen Polo R WRC	MI
2	(Germany) Volkswagen Motorsport	WRC	(Finland) Jari-Matti Latvala	(Finland) Miikka Anttila	Volkswagen Polo R WRC	MI
3	(France) Citroën Total Abu Dhabi WRT	WRC	(United Kingdom) Kris Meeke	(Republic of Ireland) Paul Nagle	Citroën DS3 WRC	MI
4	(France) Citroën Total Abu Dhabi WRT	WRC	(Norway) Mads Østberg	(Sweden) Jonas Andersson	Citroën DS3 WRC	MI
5	(United Kingdom) M-Sport Ltd	WRC	(United Kingdom) Elfyn Evans	(United Kingdom) Daniel Barritt	Ford Fiesta RS WRC	MI
6	(United Kingdom) M-Sport Ltd	WRC	(Estonia) Ott Tänak	(Estonia) Raigo Mőlder	Ford Fiesta RS WRC	MI
7	(Germany) Hyundai Motorsport	WRC	(Belgium) Thierry Neuville	(Belgium) Nicolas Gilsoul	Hyundai i20 WRC	MI
8	(Germany) Hyundai Motorsport	WRC	(Spain) Dani Sordo	(Spain) Marc Martí	Hyundai i20 WRC	MI
9	(Germany) Volkswagen Motorsport II	WRC	(Norway) Andreas Mikkelsen	(Norway) Ola Fløene	Volkswagen Polo R WRC	MI
12	(France) Citroën Total Abu Dhabi WRT	WRC	(United Arab Emirates) Khalid Al Qassimi	(United Kingdom) Chris Patterson	Citroën DS3 WRC	MI
14	(Poland) RK World Rally Team	WRC	(Poland) Robert Kubica	(Poland) Maciej Szczepaniak	Ford Fiesta RS WRC	MI
16	(Norway) Henning Solberg	WRC	(Norway) Henning Solberg	(Austria) Ilka Minor	Ford Fiesta RS WRC	MI
20	(Germany) Hyundai Motorsport N	WRC	(New Zealand) Hayden Paddon	(New Zealand) John Kennard	Hyundai i20 WRC	MI
21	(Czech Republic) Jipocar Czech National Team	WRC	(Czech Republic) Martin Prokop	(Czech Republic) Michal Ernst	Ford Fiesta RS WRC	P
31	(Saudi Arabia) Yazeed Racing	WRC-2	(Saudi Arabia) Yazeed Al-Rajhi	(United Kingdom) Michael Orr	Ford Fiesta RRC	MI
32	(France) PH Sport	WRC-2	(France) Stéphane Lefebvre	(Belgium) Stéphane Prévot	Citroën DS3 R5	MI
33	(Italy) www.Rallyproject.com srl	WRC-2	(Italy) Massimiliano Rendina	(Italy) Mario Pizzuti	Mitsubishi Lancer Evolution X	P
34	(France) Quentin Giordano	WRC-2	(France) Quentin Giordano	(France) Valentin Sarreaud	Citroën DS3 R5	MI
36	(Estonia) Karl Kruuda	WRC-2	(Estonia) Karl Kruuda	(Estonia) Martin Järveoja	Citroën DS3 R5	MI
37	(Italy) FWRT s.r.l.	WRC	(Italy) Lorenzo Bertelli	(Italy) Giovanni Bernacchini	Ford Fiesta RS WRC	P
38	(Italy) Enrico Brazzoli	WRC-2	(Italy) Enrico Brazzoli	(Italy) Maurizio Barone	Subaru Impreza WRX STi	HK
39	(France) Saintéloc Junior Team	WRC-2	(Republic of Ireland) Craig Breen	(United Kingdom) Scott Martin	Peugeot 208 T16 R5	MI
40	(United Kingdom) Drive Dmack	WRC-2	(Finland) Jari Ketomaa	(Finland) Kaj Lindström	Ford Fiesta R5	DM
41	(United Kingdom) Drive Dmack	WRC-2	(Peru) Nicolás Fuchs	(Argentina) Fernando Mussano	Ford Fiesta R5	DM
42	(Qatar) Nasser Al-Attiyah	WRC-2	(Qatar) Nasser Al-Attiyah	(France) Matthieu Baumel	Ford Fiesta RRC	MI
45	(Russia) TAIF Rally Team	WRC-2	(Russia) Radik Shaymiev	(Russia) Maxim Tsvetkov	Ford Fiesta R5	MI
45	(Italy) Gianluca Linari	WRC-2	(Italy) Gianluca Linari	(Italy) Nicola Arena	Subaru Impreza STi N15	P
51	(Romania) Napoca Rally Academy	WRC-2	(Italy) Simone Tempestini	(Italy) Matteo Chiarcossi	Subaru Impreza STi N14	P
52	(Paraguay) Diego Domínguez	WRC-2	(Paraguay) Diego Domínguez	(Argentina) Edgardo Galindo	Ford Fiesta R5	DM
54	(Paraguay) Didier Arias	WRC-2	(Paraguay) Didier Arias	(Paraguay) Héctor Núñez	Ford Fiesta R5	DM
75	Youth & Sports Qatar Rally Team	WRC-2	(Qatar) Abdulaziz Al-Kuwari	(United Kingdom) Marshall Clarke	Ford Fiesta RRC	MI

Icon	Class
WRC	WRC entries eligible to score manufacturer points
WRC	WRC entries ineligible to score manufacturer points
WRC-2	Registered to take part in WRC-2 championship

== Report ==
The race began with the return of the mythical super special stage at Lousada rallycross track, with 15,000 spectators attending. As in the shakedown, Andreas Mikkelsen was the fastest, followed by Sébastien Ogier and Jari-Matti Latvala. Robert Kubica took the all-new Ford Fiesta RS WRC – as premiered by M-Sport – to 4th place.

On the second day of the event, the rally moved to the Minho Province, with the section of Caminha proving to be quite hard, causing several dropouts and mechanical breakdowns. Ogier, as championship leader, was first into the stages and suffered a flat tyre on the second stage and finished the day in 2nd overall. At the end of the fifth stage, Latvala was the leader by 11.1 seconds ahead of Kris Meeke, with Mikkelsen 16 seconds down in third. Dani Sordo, winner of the first stage of the day, was only 5th.

On Saturday, Ogier regained some time, winning all three afternoon stages and finished the day in 2nd place, 9.5 seconds behind the leader, Latvala. Meeke won two of the stages and was 3rd, 20 seconds behind Latvala. Mikkelsen – the day's other stage winner – was fourth, trailing Meeke by 1.1 seconds. Elfyn Evans retired after the day's first stage with electrical problems in his Ford Fiesta RS WRC, while Tanak and Sordo – already at more than a minute behind the lead – were out of the fight for a podium finish. Neuville overturned and Ostberg suffered engine problems in his Citroën.

On Sunday, three stages remained; two runs of the Fafe stage – the second being the power stage – with one pass through the Vieira do Minho. On the first pass of Fafe, and the benefit of a better road position, Ogier gained 1.7 seconds on Latvala. Latvala recovered the time loss and increased the advantage to 10.4 seconds, while Mikkelsen moved ahead of Meeke into a podium position. In the decisive power-stage, Ogier recovered 2.2 seconds on Latvala, and as a result, Latvala won the event by 8.2 seconds.

== Results ==
=== Event standings (top-10) ===
Pos.	No.	Driver	Co-driver	Team	Car	Class	Time	Difference	Points
Overall classification
1	2	(Finland) Jari-Matti Latvala	(Finland) Miikka Anttila	(Germany) Volkswagen Motorsport	Volkswagen Polo R WRC	WRC	3:30:35.3		28
2	1	(France) Sébastien Ogier	(France) Julien Ingrassia	(Germany) Volkswagen Motorsport	Volkswagen Polo R WRC	WRC	3:30:43.5	+8.2	21
3	9	(Norway) Andreas Mikkelsen	(Finland) Mikko Markkula	(Germany) Volkswagen Motorsport II	Volkswagen Polo R WRC	WRC	3:31:03.9	+28.6	16
4	3	(United Kingdom) Kris Meeke	(Republic of Ireland) Paul Nagle	(France) Citroën Total Abu Dhabi WRT	Citroën DS3 WRC	WRC	3:31:24.0	+48.7	12
5	6	(Estonia) Ott Tänak	(Estonia) Raigo Mõlder	(United Kingdom) M-Sport World Rally Team	Ford Fiesta RS WRC	WRC	3:32:32.1	+1:56.8	10
6	8	(Spain) Dani Sordo	(Spain) Marc Martí	(Germany) Hyundai Motorsport	Hyundai i20 WRC	WRC	3:33:03.2	+2:27.9	8
7	4	(Norway) Mads Østberg	(Sweden) Jonas Andersson	(France) Citroën Total Abu Dhabi WRT	Citroën DS3 WRC	WRC	3:33:07.5	+2:32.2	6
8	20	(New Zealand) Hayden Paddon	(New Zealand) John Kennard	(Germany) Hyundai Shell World Rally Team	Hyundai i20 WRC	WRC	3:33:29.6	+2:54.3	4
9	14	(Poland) Robert Kubica	(Poland) Maciej Szczepaniak	(United Kingdom) RK M-Sport World Rally Team	Ford Fiesta RS WRC	WRC	3:35:14.4	+4:39.1	2
10	21	(Czech Republic) Martin Prokop	(Czech Republic) Jan Tománek	(Czech Republic) Jipocar Czech National Team	Ford Fiesta RS WRC	WRC	3:38:06.5	+7:31.2	1

=== Special stages ===
Day	Stage	Name	Length	Winner	Car	Time	Rally leader
Leg 1 (21–22 May)	SS1	SSS Lousada	3.36 km	(Norway) Andreas Mikkelsen	Volkswagen Polo R WRC	2:41.1	(Norway) Andreas Mikkelsen
Leg 1 (21–22 May)	SS2	Ponte de Lima 1	27.53 km	(Spain) Dani Sordo	Hyundai i20 WRC	19:41.5	(Spain) Dani Sordo
Leg 1 (21–22 May)	SS3	Caminha 1	18.05 km	(Norway) Mads Østberg	Citroën DS3 WRC	10:48.9	(Norway) Andreas Mikkelsen
Leg 1 (21–22 May)	SS4	Viana do Castelo 1	18.73 km	(Finland) Jari-Matti Latvala	Volkswagen Polo R WRC	11:38.3	(Finland) Jari-Matti Latvala
Leg 1 (21–22 May)	SS5	Ponte de Lima 2	27.53 km	Stage cancelled			(Finland) Jari-Matti Latvala
Leg 1 (21–22 May)	SS6	Caminha 2	18.05 km	(France) Sébastien Ogier	Volkswagen Polo R WRC	10:49.6	(Finland) Jari-Matti Latvala
Leg 1 (21–22 May)	SS7	Viana do Castelo 2	18.73 km	(Finland) Jari-Matti Latvala	Volkswagen Polo R WRC	11:30.1	(Finland) Jari-Matti Latvala
Leg 2 (23 May)	SS8	Baião 1	18.57 km	(Norway) Andreas Mikkelsen	Volkswagen Polo R WRC	11:48.3	(Finland) Jari-Matti Latvala
Leg 2 (23 May)	SS9	Marão 1	26.30 km	(United Kingdom) Kris Meeke	Citroën DS3 WRC	17:11.1	(Finland) Jari-Matti Latvala
Leg 2 (23 May)	SS10	Fridão 1	37.67 km	(United Kingdom) Kris Meeke	Citroën DS3 WRC	25:40.5	(Finland) Jari-Matti Latvala
Leg 2 (23 May)	SS11	Baião 2	18.57 km	(France) Sébastien Ogier	Volkswagen Polo R WRC	11:43.0	(Finland) Jari-Matti Latvala
Leg 2 (23 May)	SS12	Marão 2	26.30 km	(France) Sébastien Ogier	Volkswagen Polo R WRC	16:58.7	(Finland) Jari-Matti Latvala
Leg 2 (23 May)	SS13	Fridão 2	37.67 km	(France) Sébastien Ogier	Volkswagen Polo R WRC	25:17.9	(Finland) Jari-Matti Latvala
Leg 3 (24 May)	SS14	Fafe 1	11.15 km	(France) Sébastien Ogier	Volkswagen Polo R WRC	6:49.8	(Finland) Jari-Matti Latvala
Leg 3 (24 May)	SS15	Vieira do Minho	32.35 km	(Finland) Jari-Matti Latvala	Volkswagen Polo R WRC	20:38.7	(Finland) Jari-Matti Latvala
Leg 3 (24 May)	SS16	Fafe 2 (Power Stage)	11.15 km	(France) Sébastien Ogier	Volkswagen Polo R WRC	6:43.0	(Finland) Jari-Matti Latvala

=== Power Stage ===
The "Power stage" was a 11.15 km (6.93 mi) stage at the end of the rally.

Pos	Driver	Car	Time	Diff.	Pts
1	(France) Sébastien Ogier	Volkswagen Polo R WRC	6:43.0	0.0	3
2	(Finland) Jari-Matti Latvala	Volkswagen Polo R WRC	6:45.2	+2.2	2
3	(Norway) Andreas Mikkelsen	Volkswagen Polo R WRC	6:47.0	+4.0	1
