= 2013 Rally Argentina =

Car rally

2013 Rally Argentina 33rd Philips Rally Argentina
Round 5 of the 2013 World Rally Championship season
← Previous event	Next event →
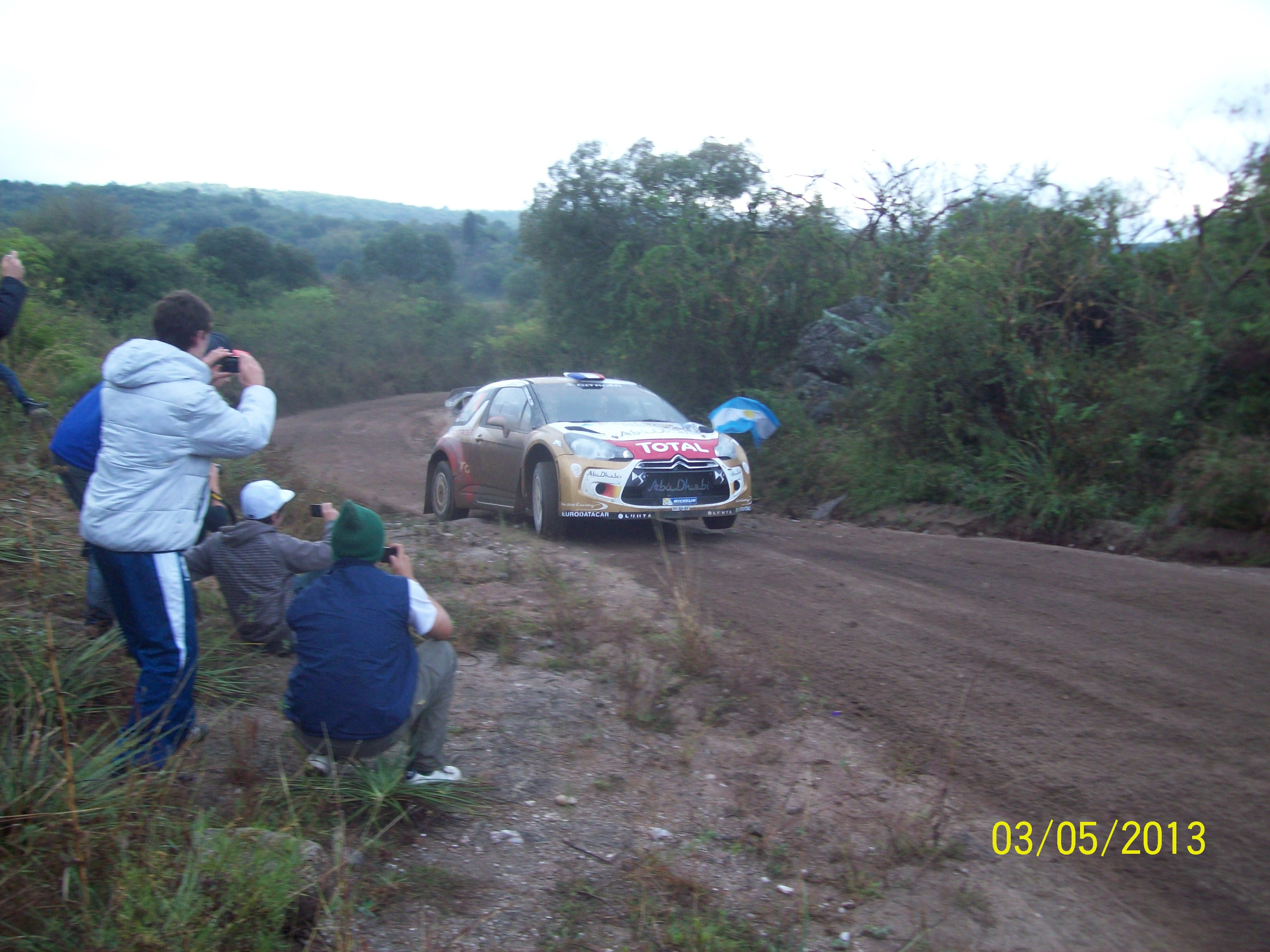
- Sébastien Loeb during Rally
- Host country: Argentina
- Rally base: Villa Carlos Paz, Córdoba, Argentina
- Dates run: May 1 – May 4, 2013
- Stages: 14 (407.64 km; 253.30 miles)
- Stage surface: Gravel

Statistics
- Crews: 32 at start, 24 at finish

Overall results
- Overall winner: (France) Sébastien Loeb (France) Citroën Total Abu Dhabi World Rally Team

2013 Rally Argentina (officially: 33rd Philips Rally Argentina) was the fifth rally in the 2013 World Rally Championship hold between 1 and 4 May. It had 14 special stages totalling 407.64 competitive kilometres. 24 out of 32 racer finished the rally successfully.

== Report ==
After missing the rallies of Mexico and Portugal to compete in the FIA Grand Touring Series, Sébastien Loeb marked his return to rallying with first place in the Rally Argentina. Sébastien Ogier took the lead early on, but made a mistake whilst driving in heavy fog. He lost forty seconds, allowing Loeb to seize the advantage. Jari-Matti Latvala and Mikko Hirvonen fought over the final podium position until Hirvonen's Citroën DS3 WRC developed an electrical problem. Latvala could not afford to rest, as he found himself fighting with Evgeny Novikov. A late charge on the final day—including the fastest time on the power stage—was enough for Latvala to secure third place and his first podium in Argentina. Hirvonen recovered to finish sixth overall, finishing third on the power stage to score an additional World Championship point.

== Entry list ==
Thirteen World Rally Cars were entered into the event, as were eight entries in the WRC-2 championship for cars built to Group N and Super 2000 regulations.

Notable entrants
No.	Entrant	Class	Driver	Co-driver	Car	Tyre
1	(France) Citroën Total Abu Dhabi WRT	WRC	(France) Sébastien Loeb	(Monaco) Daniel Elena	Citroën DS3 WRC	M
2	(France) Citroën Total Abu Dhabi WRT	WRC	(Finland) Mikko Hirvonen	(Finland) Jarmo Lehtinen	Citroën DS3 WRC	M
4	(United Kingdom) Qatar M-Sport WRT	WRC	(Norway) Mads Østberg	(Sweden) Jonas Andersson	Ford Fiesta RS WRC	M
5	(United Kingdom) Qatar M-Sport WRT	WRC	(Russia) Evgeny Novikov	(Austria) Ilka Minor	Ford Fiesta RS WRC	M
7	(Germany) Volkswagen Motorsport	WRC	(Finland) Jari-Matti Latvala	(Finland) Miikka Anttila	Volkswagen Polo R WRC	M
8	(Germany) Volkswagen Motorsport	WRC	(France) Sébastien Ogier	(France) Julien Ingrassia	Volkswagen Polo R WRC	M
9	(Germany) Volkswagen Motorsport II	WRC	(Norway) Andreas Mikkelsen	(Finland) Mikko Markkula	Volkswagen Polo R WRC	M
10	(France) Abu Dhabi Citroën Total WRT	WRC	(Spain) Dani Sordo	(Spain) Carlos del Barrio	Citroën DS3 WRC	M
11	(United Kingdom) Qatar World Rally Team	WRC	(Belgium) Thierry Neuville	(Belgium) Nicolas Gilsoul	Ford Fiesta RS WRC	M
12	(Italy) Lotos Team WRC	WRC	(Poland) Michał Kościuszko	(Poland) Maciej Szczepaniak	Mini John Cooper Works WRC	D
21	(Czech Republic) Jipocar Czech National Team	WRC	(Czech Republic) Martin Prokop	(Czech Republic) Michal Ernst	Ford Fiesta RS WRC	D
22	(Austria) Stohl Racing	WRC	(Brazil) Daniel Oliveira	(Portugal) Carlos Margalhaes	Ford Fiesta RS WRC	M
23	(United Kingdom) Qatar World Rally Team	WRC	(Argentina) Gabriel Pozzo	(Portugal) Daniel Stillo	Ford Fiesta RS WRC	M
33	(Austria) Stohl Racing	WRC-2	(Germany) Armin Kremer	(Germany) Kaus Wicha	Subaru Impreza WRX STi	M
34	(Belgium) Symtech Racing	WRC-2	(Ukraine) Yuriy Protasov	(Estonia) Kuldar Sikk	Subaru Impreza STi R4	M
37	(Italy) Lorenzo Bertelli	WRC-2	(Italy) Lorenzo Bertelli	(Italy) Lorenzo Granai	Subaru Impreza WRX STi N15	M
38	(Mexico) Moto Club Igualda	WRC-2	(Mexico) Ricardo Triviño	(Spain) Alex Haro	Mitsubishi Lancer Evo IX	M
41	(Peru) Nicolàs Fuchs	WRC-2	(Peru) Nicolàs Fuchs	(Argentina) Fernando Mussano	Mitsubishi Lancer Evolution IX	D
48	Seashore Qatar Rally Team	WRC-2	(Qatar) Abdulaziz Al-Kuwari	(Republic of Ireland) Killian Duffy	Ford Fiesta RRC	M
72	(Argentina) Juan Carlos Alonso	WRC-2	(Argentina) Juan Carlos Alonso	(Argentina) Juan Pablo Monasterolo	Mitsubishi Lancer Evo IX	D
77	(Italy) Top Run SRL	WRC-2	(Argentina) Marcos Ligato	(Argentina) Rubén García	Subaru Impreza WRX STi	M

Icon	Class
WRC	WRC entries eligible to score manufacturer points
WRC	Major entry ineligible to score manufacturer points
WRC-2	Registered to take part in WRC-2 championship
WRC-3	Registered to take part in WRC-3 championship
J-WRC	Registered to take part in Junior WRC championship

== Special stages ==
Day	Stage	Name	Length	Winner	No.	Team	Time	Avg. spd.	Rally leader
1. (1 May)	1.	Super Especial	6.04 km	(France) Sébastien Ogier (France) Julien Ingrassia	8	(Germany) Volkswagen Motorsport	4:42.1	77.1 km/h	(France) Sébastien Ogier (France) Julien Ingrassia
2. (2 May)	2.	Sta. Catalina / La Pampa 1	27.09 km	(France) Sébastien Ogier (France) Julien Ingrassia	8	(Germany) Volkswagen Motorsport	18:20.1	88.7 km/h	(France) Sébastien Ogier (France) Julien Ingrassia
2. (2 May)	3.	Ascochinga / Agua de Oro 1	51.88 km	(Finland) Mikko Hirvonen (Finland) Jarmo Lehtinen	2	(France) Citroën Total Abu Dhabi WRT	37:55.1	82.1 km/h	(France) Sébastien Ogier (France) Julien Ingrassia
2. (2 May)	4.	Sta. Catalina / La Pampa 2	27.09 km	(France) Sébastien Ogier (France) Julien Ingrassia	8	(Germany) Volkswagen Motorsport	18:01.5	90.2 km/h	(France) Sébastien Ogier (France) Julien Ingrassia
2. (2 May)	5.	Ascochinga / Agua de Oro 2	51.88 km	(France) Sébastien Ogier (France) Julien Ingrassia	8	(Germany) Volkswagen Motorsport	38:08.6	81.6 km/h	(France) Sébastien Ogier (France) Julien Ingrassia
3. (3 May)	6.	Santa Rosa - Villa del Dique 1	40.69 km	(France) Sébastien Ogier (France) Julien Ingrassia	8	(Germany) Volkswagen Motorsport	22:28.5	108.6 km/h	(France) Sébastien Ogier (France) Julien Ingrassia
3. (3 May)	7.	Amboy - Yacanto 1	39.16 km	(Norway) Mads Østberg (Sweden) Jonas Andersson	4	(United Kingdom) Qatar M-Sport WRT	22:57.3	102.4 km/h	(France) Sébastien Loeb (Monaco) Daniel Elena
3. (3 May)	8.	Santa Rosa - Villa del Dique 2	40.69 km	(France) Sébastien Loeb (Monaco) Daniel Elena	1	(France) Citroën Total Abu Dhabi WRT	21:58.6	111.1 km/h	(France) Sébastien Loeb (Monaco) Daniel Elena
3. (3 May)	9.	Amboy - Yacanto 2	39.16 km	(France) Sébastien Loeb (Monaco) Daniel Elena	1	(France) Citroën Total Abu Dhabi WRT	22:28.3	104.6 km/h	(France) Sébastien Loeb (Monaco) Daniel Elena
3. (3 May)	10.	Super Especial	6.04 km	(Finland) Jari-Matti Latvala (Finland) Miikka Anttila	7	(Germany) Volkswagen Motorsport	4:49.4	75.1 km/h	(France) Sébastien Loeb (Monaco) Daniel Elena
4. (4 May)	11.	Mina Clavero - Giulio Cesare 1	22.64 km	(Finland) Jari-Matti Latvala (Finland) Miikka Anttila	7	(Germany) Volkswagen Motorsport	18:36.4	73.0 km/h	(France) Sébastien Loeb (Monaco) Daniel Elena
4. (4 May)	12.	El Condor - Copina	16.32 km	(Finland) Jari-Matti Latvala (Finland) Miikka Anttila	7	(Germany) Volkswagen Motorsport	13:02.2	75.1 km/h	(France) Sébastien Loeb (Monaco) Daniel Elena
4. (4 May)	13.	Mina Clavero - Giulio Cesare 2	22.64 km	(Finland) Jari-Matti Latvala (Finland) Miikka Anttila	7	(Germany) Volkswagen Motorsport	18:14.3	74.5 km/h	(France) Sébastien Loeb (Monaco) Daniel Elena
4. (4 May)	14.	El Condor (Power Stage)	16.32 km	(Finland) Jari-Matti Latvala (Finland) Miikka Anttila	7	(Germany) Volkswagen Motorsport	12:57.2	75.6 km/h	(France) Sébastien Loeb (Monaco) Daniel Elena

=== Power Stage ===
Position	Racer	Time	Difference	Average speed	Point
1	(Finland) Jari-Matti Latvala	12:57.2	0.0	75.6 km/h	3
2	(France) Sébastien Ogier	12:58.6	+1.4	75.5 km/h	2
3	(Finland) Mikko Hirvonen	12:59.7	+2.5	75.4 km/h	1

== Result ==
Pos.	No.	Racer	Navigator	Team	Car	Championship	Time	Difference	Point
1	1	(France) Sébastien Loeb	(Monaco) Daniel Elena	(France) Citroën Total Abu Dhabi WRT	Citroën DS3 WRC	WRC	4:35:56.7	0.0	25
2	8	(France) Sébastien Ogier	(France) Julien Ingrassia	(Germany) Volkswagen Motorsport	Volkswagen Polo R WRC	WRC	4:36:51.7	+55.0	20
3	7	(Finland) Jari-Matti Latvala	(Finland) Miikka Anttila	(Germany) Volkswagen Motorsport	Volkswagen Polo R WRC	WRC	4:37:57.5	+2:00.8	18
4	5	(Russia) Evgeny Novikov	(Austria) Ilka Minor	(United Kingdom) Qatar M-Sport WRT	Ford Fiesta RS WRC	WRC	4:38:33.4	+2:36.7	12
5	11	(Belgium) Thierry Neuville	(Belgium) Nicolas Gilsoul	(United Kingdom) Qatar World Rally Team	Ford Fiesta RS WRC	WRC	4:40:37.2	+4:40.5	10
6	2	(Finland) Mikko Hirvonen	(Finland) Jarmo Lehtinen	(France) Citroën Total Abu Dhabi WRT	Citroën DS3 WRC	WRC	4:42:20.6	+6:23.9	9
7	4	(Norway) Mads Østberg	(Sweden) Jonas Andersson	(United Kingdom) Qatar M-Sport WRT	Ford Fiesta RS WRC	WRC	4:46:58.9	+11:02.2	6
8	9	(Norway) Andreas Mikkelsen	(Finland) Mikko Markkula	(Germany) Volkswagen Motorsport	Volkswagen Polo R WRC	WRC	4:49:18.8	+13:22.1	4
9	10	(Spain) Dani Sordo	(Spain) Carlos del Barrio	(France) Abu Dhabi Citroën Total WRT	Citroën DS3 WRC	WRC	4:49:19.0	+13:22.3	2
10	21	(Czech Republic) Martin Prokop	(Czech Republic) Michal Ernst	(Czech Republic) Jipocar Czech National Team	Ford Fiesta RS WRC	WRC	4:50:04.3	+14:07.6	1
WRC-2
1 (13.)	48	(Qatar) Abdulaziz Al-Kuwari	(Republic of Ireland) Killian Duffy	Seashore Qatar Rally Team	Ford Fiesta RRC	WRC-2	5:08:27.1	0.0	25
2 (15.)	41	(Peru) Nicolás Fuchs	(Argentina) Fernando Mussano	(Peru) Nicolás Fuchs	Mitsubishi Lancer Evolution IX	WRC-2	5:21:34.0	+13:06.9	18
3 (16.)	77	(Argentina) Marcos Ligato	(Argentina) Rubén García	(Italy) Top Run SRL	Subaru Impreza WRX STi	WRC-2	5:31:39.0	+23:11.9	15
4 (17.)	72	(Argentina) Juan Carlos Alonso	(Argentina) Juan Pablo Monasterolo	(Argentina) Juan Carlos Alonso	Mitsubishi Lancer Evo X	WRC-2	5:37:49.8	+29:22.7	12
5 (18.)	34	(Ukraine) Yuriy Protasov	(Estonia) Kuldar Sikk	(Belgium) Symtech Racing	Subaru Impreza STi R4	WRC-2	5:40:26.6	+31:59.5	10
6 (19.)	38	(Mexico) Ricardo Triviño	(Spain) Alex Haro	(Mexico) Moto Club Igualda	Mitsubishi Lancer Evo IX	WRC-2	5:40:44.7	+32:17.6	8
