= 2013 Rally México =

2013 Rally México 27° Rally Guanajuato México
Round 3 of 13 of the 2013 World Rally Championship
← Previous event	Next event →
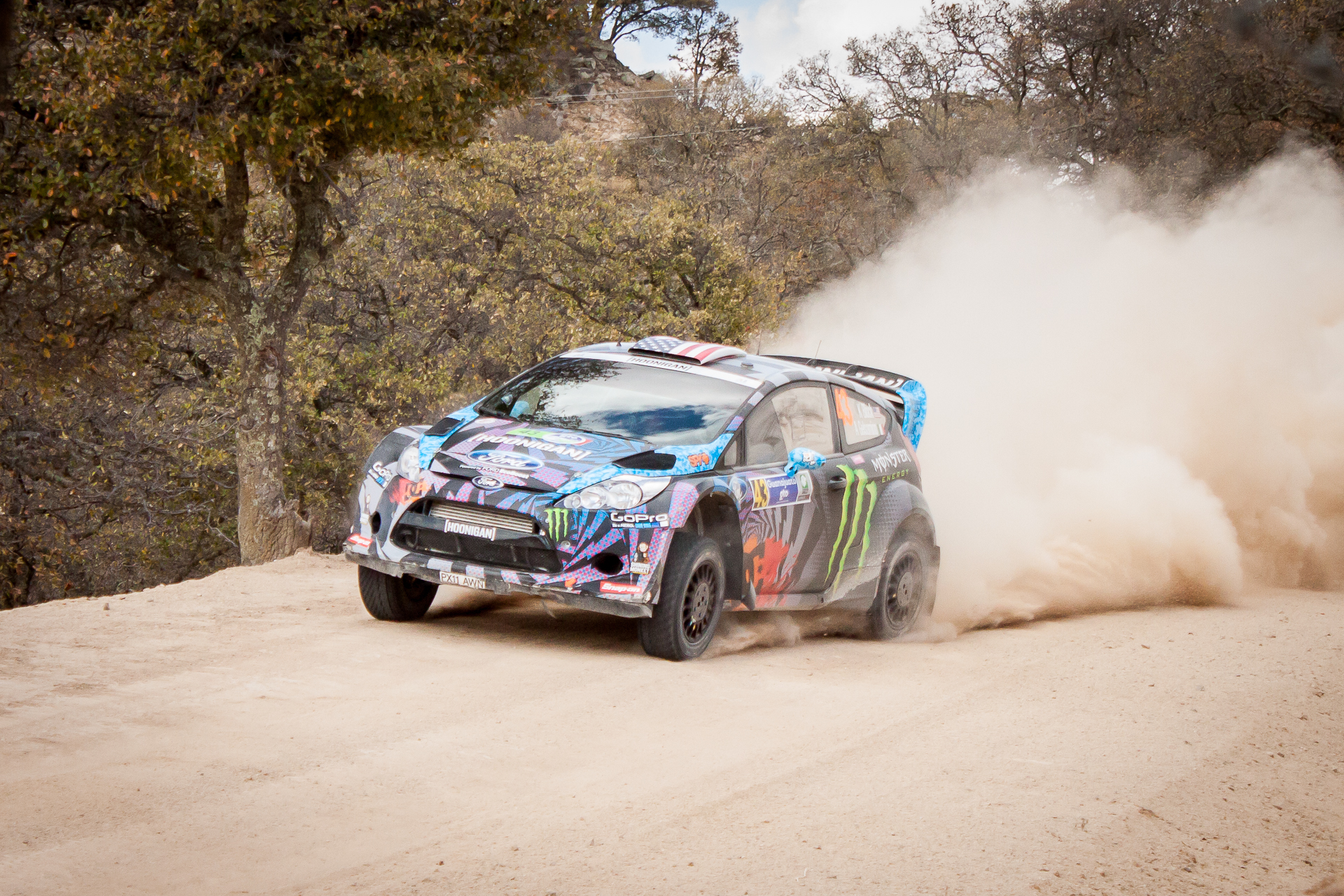
- Host country: Mexico
- Rally base: (Mexico) León
- Dates run: 7 – 10 March 2013
- Stages: 23 (394.88 km; 245.37 miles)
- Stage surface: Gravel

Statistics
- Crews: 25 at start, 20 at finish

Overall results
- Overall winner: (France) Sébastien Ogier (France) Julien Ingrassia (Germany) Volkswagen Motorsport

The 2013 Rally Guanajuato México was a motor racing event for rally cars that was held over four days between 7 and 10 March, which marked the 27th running of the Rally México. The rally was based in the town of León, Guanajuato. The rally itself was contested over 23 special stages, covering a total of 394.88 km (245.37 mi) in competitive stages.

The rally was the third round of the 2013 World Rally Championship season, and marked the fortieth anniversary of the World Rally Championship. Thirteen World Rally Car crews were entered in the event. It was the first WRC event since the 2006 Rally GB where reigning World Rally Champion Sébastien Loeb has not featured on the entry list as he elected not to enter Rally México as part of his four-race 'retirement' season. Loeb has won every Rally México since 2006. Since there is no previous Rally Mexico winner competing in the 2013 event, it is guaranteed that there will be a new winner.

== Entry list ==
Thirteen World Rally Cars were entered into the event, as were six entries in the newly formed WRC-2 championship for cars built to Group N and Super 2000 regulations. There were no WRC-3 entries.

Notable entrants
No.	Entrant	Class	Driver	Co-driver	Car	Tyre
2	(France) Citroën Total Abu Dhabi WRT	WRC	(Finland) Mikko Hirvonen	(Finland) Jarmo Lehtinen	Citroën DS3 WRC	MI
3	(France) Citroën Total Abu Dhabi WRT	WRC	(Spain) Dani Sordo	(Spain) Carlos del Barrio	Citroën DS3 WRC	MI
4	(United Kingdom) Qatar M-Sport WRT	WRC	(Norway) Mads Østberg	(Sweden) Jonas Andersson	Ford Fiesta RS WRC	MI
5	(United Kingdom) Qatar M-Sport WRT	WRC	(Russia) Evgeny Novikov	(Austria) Ilka Minor	Ford Fiesta RS WRC	MI
6	(United Kingdom) Qatar World Rally Team	WRC	(Qatar) Nasser Al-Attiyah	(Italy) Giovanni Bernacchini	Ford Fiesta RS WRC	MI
7	(Germany) Volkswagen Motorsport	WRC	(Finland) Jari-Matti Latvala	(Finland) Miikka Anttila	Volkswagen Polo R WRC	MI
8	(Germany) Volkswagen Motorsport	WRC	(France) Sébastien Ogier	(France) Julien Ingrassia	Volkswagen Polo R WRC	MI
10	(France) Abu Dhabi Citroën Total WRT	WRC	(Australia) Chris Atkinson	(Belgium) Stéphane Prévot	Citroën DS3 WRC	MI
11	(United Kingdom) Qatar World Rally Team	WRC	(Belgium) Thierry Neuville	(Belgium) Nicolas Gilsoul	Ford Fiesta RS WRC	MI
12	(Italy) Lotos Team WRC	WRC	(Poland) Michał Kościuszko	(Poland) Maciej Szczepaniak	Mini John Cooper Works WRC	DM
14	(Mexico) Benito Guerra, Jr.	WRC	(Mexico) Benito Guerra, Jr.	(Spain) Borja Rozada	Citroën DS3 WRC	MI
21	(Czech Republic) Jipocar Czech National Team	WRC	(Czech Republic) Martin Prokop	(Czech Republic) Michal Ernst	Ford Fiesta RS WRC	DM
33	(Austria) Stohl Racing	WRC-2	(Germany) Armin Kremer	(Germany) Klaus Wicha	Subaru Impreza WRX STi	MI
34	(Belgium) Symtech Racing	WRC-2	(Ukraine) Yuriy Protasov	(Estonia) Kuldar Sikk	Subaru Impreza STi R4	MI
37	(Italy) Lorenzo Bertelli	WRC-2	(Italy) Lorenzo Bertelli	(Italy) Lorenzo Granai	Subaru Impreza WRX STi	MI
38	(Mexico) Moto Club Igualda	WRC-2	(Mexico) Ricardo Triviño	(Spain) Àlex Haro	Mitsubishi Lancer Evolution X	MI
41	(Peru) Nicolàs Fuchs	WRC-2	(Peru) Nicolàs Fuchs	(Argentina) Fernando Mussano	Mitsubishi Lancer Evolution X	DM
43	(United States) Hoonigan Racing Division	WRC	(United States) Ken Block	(Italy) Alex Gelsomino	Ford Fiesta RS WRC	MI
48	Seashore Qatar Rally Team	WRC-2	(Qatar) Abdulaziz Al-Kuwari	(Republic of Ireland) Killian Duffy	Ford Fiesta RRC	MI

Icon	Class
WRC	WRC entries eligible to score manufacturer points
WRC	Major entry ineligible to score manufacturer points
WRC-2	Registered to take part in WRC-2 championship

== Results ==
=== Event standings ===
Pos.	No.	Driver	Co-driver	Team	Car	Class	Time	Difference	Points
Overall classification
1	8	(France) Sébastien Ogier	(France) Julien Ingrassia	(Germany) Volkswagen Motorsport	Volkswagen Polo R WRC	WRC	4:30:31.2	0.0	28
2	2	(Finland) Mikko Hirvonen	(Finland) Jarmo Lehtinen	(France) Citroën Total Abu Dhabi WRT	Citroën DS3 WRC	WRC	4:33:58.0	+3:26.8	18
3	11	(Belgium) Thierry Neuville	(Belgium) Nicolas Gilsoul	(United Kingdom) Qatar World Rally Team	Ford Fiesta RS WRC	WRC	4:34:50.8	+4:19.6	15
4	3	(Spain) Dani Sordo	(Spain) Carlos del Barrio	(France) Citroën Total Abu Dhabi WRT	Citroën DS3 WRC	WRC	4:36:33.7	+6:02.5	12
5	6	(Qatar) Nasser Al-Attiyah	(Italy) Giovanni Bernacchini	(United Kingdom) Qatar World Rally Team	Ford Fiesta RS WRC	WRC	4:39:01.6	+8:30.4	10
6	10	(Australia) Chris Atkinson	(Belgium) Stéphane Prévot	(France) Abu Dhabi Citroën Total WRT	Citroën DS3 WRC	WRC	4:41:55.0	+11:23.8	8
7	43	(United States) Ken Block	(Italy) Alex Gelsomino	(United States) Hoonigan Racing Division	Ford Fiesta RS WRC	WRC	4:42:15.3	+11:44.1	6
8	14	(Mexico) Benito Guerra, Jr.	(Spain) Borja Rozada	(Mexico) Benito Guerra, Jr.	Citroën DS3 WRC	WRC	4:43:12.3	+12:41.1	4
9	21	(Czech Republic) Martin Prokop	(Czech Republic) Michal Ernst	(Czech Republic) Jipocar Czech National Team	Ford Fiesta RS WRC	WRC	4:44:56.0	+14:24.8	2
10	5	(Russia) Evgeny Novikov	(Austria) Ilka Minor	(United Kingdom) Qatar M-Sport WRT	Ford Fiesta RS WRC	WRC	4:47:42.3	+17:11.1	1
11	4	(Norway) Mads Østberg	(Sweden) Jonas Andersson	(United Kingdom) Qatar M-Sport WRT	Ford Fiesta RS WRC	WRC	4:57:07.4	+26:36.2	2
16	7	(Finland) Jari-Matti Latvala	(Finland) Miikka Anttila	(Germany) Volkswagen Motorsport	Volkswagen Polo R WRC	WRC	5:25:20.3	+54:49.1	1
WRC-2 standings
1 (12.)	48	(Qatar) Abdulaziz Al-Kuwari	(Republic of Ireland) Killian Duffy	Seashore Qatar Rally Team	Ford Fiesta RRC	WRC-2	5:01:10.3	0.0	25
2 (13.)	41	(Peru) Nicolás Fuchs	(Argentina) Fernando Mussano	(Peru) Nicolás Fuchs	Mitsubishi Lancer Evolution IX	WRC-2	5:10:25.7	+9:15.4	18
3 (14.)	38	(Mexico) Ricardo Triviño	(Spain) Àlex Haro	(Mexico) Moto Club Igualda	Mitsubishi Lancer Evolution X	WRC-2	5:18:44.5	+17:34.2	15
4 (17.)	33	(Germany) Armin Kremer	(Germany) Klaus Wicha	(Austria) Stohl Racing	Subaru Impreza WRX STi	WRC-2	5:49:13.1	+48:02.8	12
5 (18.)	34	(Ukraine) Yuriy Protasov	(Estonia) Kuldar Sikk	(Belgium) Symtech Racing	Subaru Impreza STi R4	WRC-2	5:57:12.3	+56:02.0	10

=== Special stages ===
Day	Stage number	Stage name	Length	Stage winner	Car No.	Team	Time	Avg. spd.	Rally leader
Leg 1 (7–8 Mar)	SS1	Monster Street Stage Guanajuato	1.05 km	(Belgium) Thierry Neuville (Belgium) Nicolas Gilsoul	11	(United Kingdom) Qatar World Rally Team	0:53.7	70.39 km/h	(Belgium) Thierry Neuville (Belgium) Nicolas Gilsoul
Leg 1 (7–8 Mar)	SS2	Parque Bicentenario	2.60 km	(France) Sébastien Ogier (France) Julien Ingrassia	8	(Germany) Volkswagen Motorsport	2:25.3	64.42 km/h	(France) Sébastien Ogier (France) Julien Ingrassia
Leg 1 (7–8 Mar)	SS3	El Cubilete 1	21.91 km	(France) Sébastien Ogier (France) Julien Ingrassia	8	(Germany) Volkswagen Motorsport	12:50.7	102.34 km/h	(France) Sébastien Ogier (France) Julien Ingrassia
Leg 1 (7–8 Mar)	SS4	Las Minas 1	15.31 km	(Norway) Mads Østberg (Sweden) Jonas Andersson	4	(United Kingdom) Qatar M-Sport WRT	11:18.4	81.24 km/h	(Norway) Mads Østberg (Sweden) Jonas Andersson
Leg 1 (7–8 Mar)	SS5	Los Mexicanos 1	9.76 km	(Norway) Mads Østberg (Sweden) Jonas Andersson	4	(United Kingdom) Qatar M-Sport WRT	7:44.0	75.72 km/h	(Norway) Mads Østberg (Sweden) Jonas Andersson
Leg 1 (7–8 Mar)	SS6	El Chocolate 1	30.57 km	(France) Sébastien Ogier (France) Julien Ingrassia	8	(Germany) Volkswagen Motorsport	23:28.8	78.11 km/h	(France) Sébastien Ogier (France) Julien Ingrassia
Leg 1 (7–8 Mar)	SS7	Street Stage León 1	1.23 km	(France) Sébastien Ogier (France) Julien Ingrassia	8	(Germany) Volkswagen Motorsport	1:15.6	58.57 km/h	(France) Sébastien Ogier (France) Julien Ingrassia
Leg 1 (7–8 Mar)	SS8	El Cubilete 2	21.91 km	(France) Sébastien Ogier (France) Julien Ingrassia	8	(Germany) Volkswagen Motorsport	12:43.9	103.25 km/h	(France) Sébastien Ogier (France) Julien Ingrassia
Leg 1 (7–8 Mar)	SS9	Las Minas 2	15.31 km	(Norway) Mads Østberg (Sweden) Jonas Andersson	4	(United Kingdom) Qatar M-Sport WRT	11:07.5	82.57 km/h	(France) Sébastien Ogier (France) Julien Ingrassia
Leg 1 (7–8 Mar)	SS10	Los Mexicanos 2	9.76 km	(Norway) Mads Østberg (Sweden) Jonas Andersson	4	(United Kingdom) Qatar M-Sport WRT	7:37.6	76.78 km/h	(France) Sébastien Ogier (France) Julien Ingrassia
Leg 1 (7–8 Mar)	SS11	El Chocolate 2	30.57 km	(France) Sébastien Ogier (France) Julien Ingrassia	8	(Germany) Volkswagen Motorsport	22:54.6	80.06 km/h	(France) Sébastien Ogier (France) Julien Ingrassia
Leg 1 (7–8 Mar)	SS12	Super Special 1	2.21 km	(France) Sébastien Ogier (France) Julien Ingrassia	8	(Germany) Volkswagen Motorsport	1:37.7	81.43 km/h	(France) Sébastien Ogier (France) Julien Ingrassia
Leg 1 (7–8 Mar)	SS13	Super Special 2	2.21 km	(France) Sébastien Ogier (France) Julien Ingrassia	8	(Germany) Volkswagen Motorsport	1:35.5	83.30 km/h	(France) Sébastien Ogier (France) Julien Ingrassia
Leg 2 (9 Mar)	SS14	Ibarrilla 1	30.04 km	(France) Sébastien Ogier (France) Julien Ingrassia	8	(Germany) Volkswagen Motorsport	17:49.8	101.09 km/h	(France) Sébastien Ogier (France) Julien Ingrassia
Leg 2 (9 Mar)	SS15	Otates 1	42.17 km	(France) Sébastien Ogier (France) Julien Ingrassia	8	(Germany) Volkswagen Motorsport	30:21.4	83.35 km/h	(France) Sébastien Ogier (France) Julien Ingrassia
Leg 2 (9 Mar)	SS16	Street Stage León 2	1.23 km	(Finland) Mikko Hirvonen (Finland) Jarmo Lehtinen	2	(France) Citroën Total Abu Dhabi WRT	1:15.8	58.42 km/h	(France) Sébastien Ogier (France) Julien Ingrassia
Leg 2 (9 Mar)	SS17	Ibarrilla 2	30.04 km	(France) Sébastien Ogier (France) Julien Ingrassia	8	(Germany) Volkswagen Motorsport	17:40.3	101.99 km/h	(France) Sébastien Ogier (France) Julien Ingrassia
Leg 2 (9 Mar)	SS18	Otates 2	42.17 km	(France) Sébastien Ogier (France) Julien Ingrassia	8	(Germany) Volkswagen Motorsport	29:55.4	84.56 km/h	(France) Sébastien Ogier (France) Julien Ingrassia
Leg 2 (9 Mar)	SS19	Super Special 3	2.21 km	(France) Sébastien Ogier (France) Julien Ingrassia	8	(Germany) Volkswagen Motorsport	1:37.4	81.68 km/h	(France) Sébastien Ogier (France) Julien Ingrassia
Leg 2 (9 Mar)	SS20	Super Special 4	2.21 km	(France) Sébastien Ogier (France) Julien Ingrassia	8	(Germany) Volkswagen Motorsport	1:35.0	83.75 km/h	(France) Sébastien Ogier (France) Julien Ingrassia
Leg 3 (10 Mar)	SS21	Guanajuatito	54.85 km	(Finland) Mikko Hirvonen (Finland) Jarmo Lehtinen	2	(France) Citroën Total Abu Dhabi WRT	35:58.4	91.48 km/h	(France) Sébastien Ogier (France) Julien Ingrassia
Leg 3 (10 Mar)	SS22	Derramadero (Power stage)	21.14 km	(France) Sébastien Ogier (France) Julien Ingrassia	8	(Germany) Volkswagen Motorsport	13:00.5	97.51 km/h	(France) Sébastien Ogier (France) Julien Ingrassia
Leg 3 (10 Mar)	SS23	Super Special 5	4.42 km	(Spain) Dani Sordo (Spain) Carlos del Barrio	3	(France) Citroën Total Abu Dhabi WRT	3:10.0	83.75 km/h	(France) Sébastien Ogier (France) Julien Ingrassia

=== Notable retirements ===
Stage	No.	Driver	Co-driver	Team	Car	Class	Cause
SS13	37	(Italy) Lorenzo Bertelli	(Italy) Lorenzo Granai	(Italy) Lorenzo Bertelli	Subaru Impreza WRX STi	WRC-2	Fuel tank
SS21	12	(Poland) Michał Kościuszko	(Poland) Maciej Szczepaniak	(Italy) Lotos Team WRC	Mini John Cooper Works WRC	WRC	Engine
