= 2013 Acropolis Rally =

2013 Acropolis Rally 59th Acropolis Rally
Round 6 of the 2013 World Rally Championship season
| ← Previous event | Next event → |
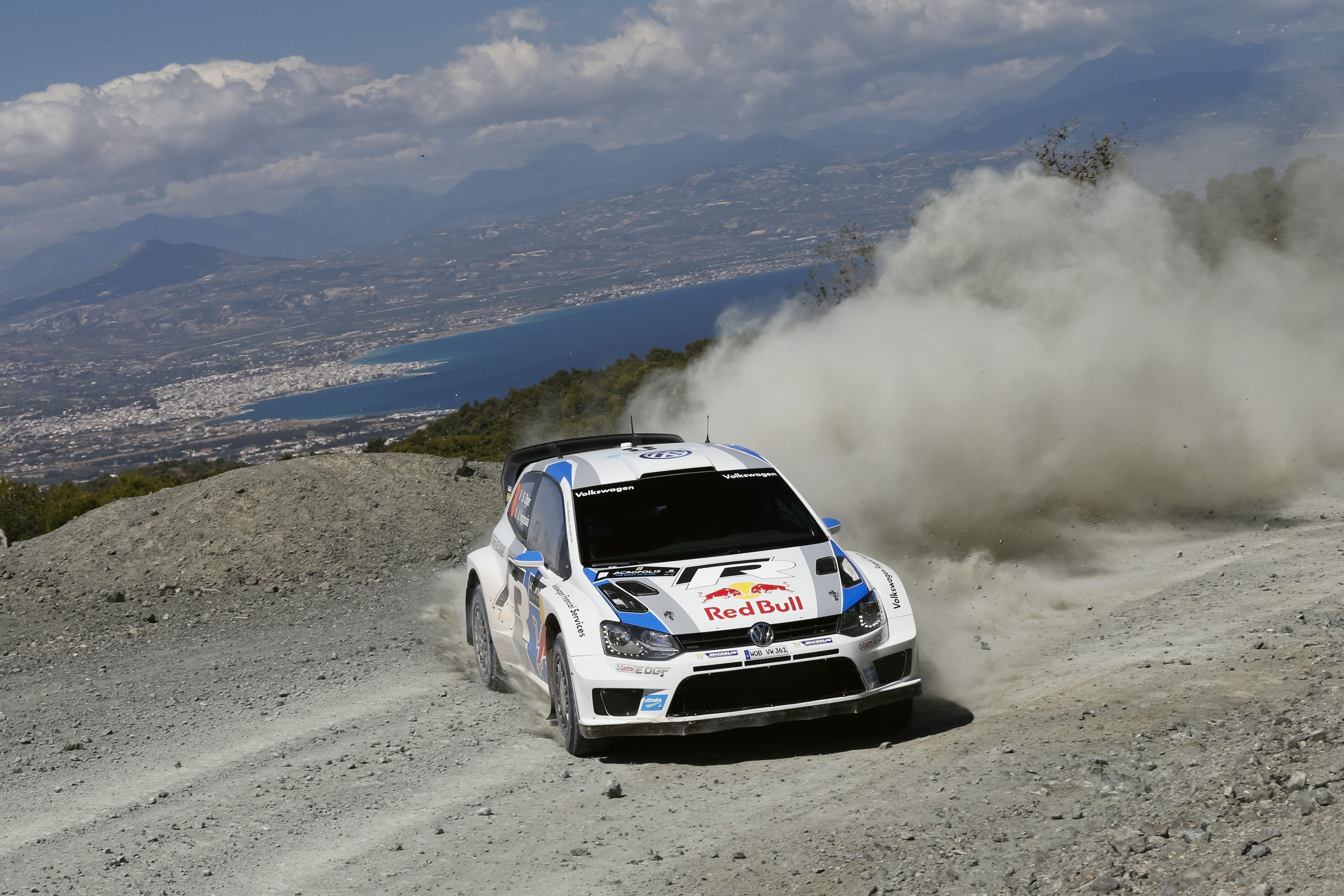
- Sébastien Ogier during Rally
- Host country: Greece
- Rally base: Loutraki, Corinthia
- Dates run: May 31 – June 2, 2013
- Stages: 14 (306.53 km; 190.47 miles)
- Stage surface: Gravel

Statistics
- Crews: 46 at start, 29 (+ 6 J-WRC) at finish

Overall results
- Overall winner: (Finland) Jari-Matti Latvala (Germany) Volkswagen Motorsport

The 2013 Acropolis Rally was the sixth round of the 2013 World Rally Championship season. The event was based in Loutraki, Corinthia, and started on 31 May and was concluded on 2 June after fourteen special stages, totaling 306 competitive kilometres.

== Report ==
Jari-Matti Latvala took his first win of the 2013 season, and his first win for Volkswagen on the Acropolis Rally. The opening forty-seven kilometre stage proved to be difficult, claiming three high-profile victims in Sébastien Ogier, Mads Østberg and Mikko Hirvonen in short order, and Evgeny Novikov emerged as the surprise early leader, building up a thirty-second advantage at the end of the first leg. The Russian's lead was short-lived, as he developed a puncture early in the second leg and was forced to limp back to the service park. Latvala took control of the rally while Andreas Mikkelsen in the third factory-supported Polo R began to work his way up through the points-paying positions. He ultimately missed out on a podium finish of his own, as Dani Sordo and Thierry Neuville each took their second podium finish of the season with second and third place respectively. Latvala's result was briefly challenged by Citroën, who believed his car was in violation of the technical regulations, but the protest was dismissed and Latvala's result was confirmed, allowing him to secure second place in the drivers' championship standings behind team-mate Ogier.

== Entry list ==
Eleven World Rally Cars were entered into the event, as were sixteen WRC-2 entries and tend for the JWRC.

Notable entrants
| No. | Entrant | Class | Driver | Co-driver | Car | Tyre |
|---|---|---|---|---|---|---|
| 2 | (France) Citroën Total Abu Dhabi WRT | WRC | (Finland) Mikko Hirvonen | (Finland) Jarmo Lehtinen | Citroën DS3 WRC | MI |
| 3 | (France) Citroën Total Abu Dhabi WRT | WRC | (Spain) Dani Sordo | (Spain) Carlos del Barrio | Citroën DS3 WRC | MI |
| 4 | (United Kingdom) Qatar M-Sport WRT | WRC | (Norway) Mads Østberg | (Sweden) Jonas Andersson | Ford Fiesta RS WRC | MI |
| 5 | (United Kingdom) Qatar M-Sport WRT | WRC | (Russia) Evgeny Novikov | (Austria) Ilka Minor | Ford Fiesta RS WRC | MI |
| 6 | (United Kingdom) Qatar World Rally Team | WRC | (Qatar) Nasser Al-Attiyah | (Italy) Giovanni Bernacchini | Ford Fiesta RS WRC | MI |
| 7 | (Germany) Volkswagen Motorsport | WRC | (Finland) Jari-Matti Latvala | (Finland) Miikka Anttila | Volkswagen Polo R WRC | MI |
| 8 | (Germany) Volkswagen Motorsport | WRC | (France) Sébastien Ogier | (France) Julien Ingrassia | Volkswagen Polo R WRC | MI |
| 9 | (Germany) Volkswagen Motorsport II | WRC | (Norway) Andreas Mikkelsen | (Finland) Mikko Markkula | Volkswagen Polo R WRC | MI |
| 10 | (France) Abu Dhabi Citroën Total WRT | WRC | (United Arab Emirates) Khalid Al Qassimi | (United Kingdom) Scott Martin | Citroën DS3 WRC | MI |
| 11 | (United Kingdom) Qatar World Rally Team | WRC | (Belgium) Thierry Neuville | (Belgium) Nicolas Gilsoul | Ford Fiesta RS WRC | MI |
| 21 | (Czech Republic) Jipocar Czech National Team | WRC | (Czech Republic) Martin Prokop | (Czech Republic) Michal Ernst | Ford Fiesta RS WRC | DM |
| 36 | (United Arab Emirates) Skydive Dubai Rally Team | WRC-2 | (United Arab Emirates) Rashid al Ketbi | (Germany) Karina Hepperle | Škoda Fabia S2000 | DM |
| 37 | (Italy) Lorenzo Bertelli | WRC-2 | (Italy) Lorenzo Bertelli | (Italy) Mitia Dotta | Ford Fiesta RRC | MI |
| 38 | (Mexico) Moto Club Igualda | WRC-2 | (Mexico) Ricardo Triviño | (Spain) Alex Haro | Mitsubishi Lancer Evo IX | MI |
| 40 | (Kazakhstan) Arman Smailov | WRC-2 | (Kazakhstan) Arman Smailov | (Russia) Andrei Rusov | Subaru Impreza WRX STi | MI |
| 41 | (Peru) Nicolàs Fuchs | WRC-2 | (Peru) Nicolàs Fuchs | (Argentina) Fernando Mussano | Mitsubishi Lancer Evolution X | DM |
| 45 | (Spain) Alexander Villanueva | WRC-2 | (Spain) Alexander Villanueva | (Spain) Oscar Sanchez | Mitsubishi Lancer Evo X | MI |
| 46 | (Italy) Marco Vallario | WRC-2 | (Italy) Marco Vallario | (Italy) Antonio Pascale | Mitsubishi Lancer Evo X | DM |
| 48 | Seashore Qatar Rally Team | WRC-2 | (Qatar) Abdulaziz Al-Kuwari | (Republic of Ireland) Killian Duffy | Ford Fiesta RRC | MI |
| 49 | (Ukraine) Mentos Ascania Racing | WRC-2 | (Ukraine) Oleksiy Kikireshko | (Estonia) Sergei Larens | Mini John Cooper Works S2000 | P |
| 50 | (Ukraine) Mentos Ascania Racing | WRC-2 | (Ukraine) Valeriy Gorban | (Ukraine) Volodymir Korsia | Mini John Cooper Works S2000 | P |
| 71 | (Jordan) Motortune Racing | WRC-2 | (Jordan) Ala'a Rasheed | (Lebanon) Joseph Matar | Ford Fiesta RRC | MI |
| 72 | (Argentina) Juan Carlos Alonso | WRC-2 | (Argentina) Juan Carlos Alonso | (Argentina) Juan Pablo Monasterolo | Mitsubishi Lancer Evo X | DM |
| 74 | (Poland) Robert Kubica | WRC-2 | (Poland) Robert Kubica | (Poland) Maciek Baran | Citroën DS3 RRC | MI |
| 76 | (Indonesia) Bosowa Rally Team | WRC-2 | (Indonesia) Subhan Aksa | (Italy) Nicola Arena | Ford Fiesta RRC | MI |
| 82 | (Estonia) MM Motorsport | WRC-2 | (Ukraine) Yuriy Protasov | (Estonia) Kuldar Sikk | Ford Fiesta RRC | MI |
| 83 | (Ukraine) Oleksiy Tamrazov | WRC-2 | (Ukraine) Oleksiy Tamrazov | (Ukraine) Pavlo Cherepin | Ford Fiesta RRC | MI |
| 100 | (Estonia) Sander Pärn | J-WRC | (Estonia) Sander Pärn | (Estonia) Ken Järveoja | Ford Fiesta R2 | HK |
| 102 | (Sweden) Pontus Tidemand | J-WRC | (Sweden) Pontus Tidemand | (Norway) Ola Fløene | Ford Fiesta R2 | HK |
| 103 | (Slovakia) Styllex Motorsport | J-WRC | (Slovakia) Martin Koči | (Czech Republic) Petr Starý | Ford Fiesta R2 | HK |
| 104 | (Finland) Andreas Amberg | J-WRC | (Finland) Andreas Amberg | (Finland) Mikko Lukka | Ford Fiesta R2 | HK |
| 105 | (Spain) ACSM Rallye Team | J-WRC | (Spain) José Antonio Suárez | (Spain) Cándido Carrera | Ford Fiesta R2 | HK |
| 106 | (Turkey) Castrol Ford Team Türkiye | J-WRC | (Turkey) Murat Bostancı | (Turkey) Onur Vatansever | Ford Fiesta R2 | HK |
| 107 | (Switzerland) Michaël Burri | J-WRC | (Switzerland) Michaël Burri | (France) Gabin Moreau | Ford Fiesta R2 | HK |
| 108 | (Finland) Niko-Pekka Nieminen | J-WRC | (Finland) Niko-Pekka Nieminen | (Finland) Mikael Korhonen | Ford Fiesta R2 | HK |
| 109 | (Norway) Marius Aasen | J-WRC | (Norway) Marius Aasen | (Norway) Marlene Engan | Ford Fiesta R2 | HK |
| 110 | (Spain) Yeray Lemes | J-WRC | (Spain) Yeray Lemes | (Spain) Rogelio Peñate | Ford Fiesta R2 | HK |

| Icon | Class |
|---|---|
| WRC | WRC entries eligible to score manufacturer points |
| WRC | Major entry ineligible to score manufacturer points |
| WRC-2 | Registered to take part in WRC-2 championship |
| WRC-3 | Registered to take part in WRC-3 championship |
| J-WRC | Registered to take part in Junior WRC championship |

== Results ==
=== Event standings ===
| Pos. | Driver | Co-driver | Car | Time | Difference | Points |
Overall Classification
| 1. | (Finland) Jari-Matti Latvala | (Finland) Miikka Anttila | Volkswagen Polo R WRC | 3:31:01.2 | 0.0 | 25 |
| 2. | (Spain) Dani Sordo | (Spain) Carlos del Barrio | Citroën DS3 WRC | 3:32:51.2 | +1:50.0 | 18 |
| 3. | (Belgium) Thierry Neuville | (Belgium) Nicolas Gilsou | Ford Fiesta RS WRC | 3:33:15.3 | +2:14.1 | 15 |
| 4. | (Norway) Andreas Mikkelsen | (Finland) Mikko Markkula | Volkswagen Polo R WRC | 3:34:56.3 | +3:55.1 | 13 |
| 5. | (Qatar) Nasser Al-Attiyah | (Italy) Giovanni Bernacchini | Ford Fiesta RS WRC | 3:35:13.8 | +4:12.6 | 10 |
| 6. | (Norway) Mads Østberg | (Sweden) Jonas Andersson | Ford Fiesta RS WRC | 3:36:49.9 | +5:48.7 | 8 |
| 7. | (Czech Republic) Martin Prokop | (Czech Republic) Michal Ernst | Ford Fiesta RS WRC | 3:38:23.6 | +7:22.4 | 6 |
| 8. | (Finland) Mikko Hirvonen | (Finland) Jarno Lehtinen | Citroën DS3 WRC | 3:38:57.8 | +7:56.6 | 4 |
| 9. | (Russia) Evgeny Novikov | (Austria) Ilka Minor | Ford Fiesta RS WRC | 3:39:13.0 | +8:11.8 | 4 |
| 10. | (France) Sébastien Ogier | (France) Julien Ingrassia | Volkswagen Polo R WRC | 3:41:11.5 | +10:10.3 | 4 |
WRC-2
| 1. (11.) | (Poland) Robert Kubica | (Poland) Maciek Baran | Citroën DS3 RRC | 3:46:20.3 | 0:00.0 | 25 |
| 2. (12.) | (Ukraine) Yuriy Protasov | (Estonia) Kuldar Sikk | Ford Fiesta RRC | 3:47:50.1 | +1:29.8 | 18 |
| 3. (13.) | (Qatar) Abdulaziz Al-Kuwari | (Republic of Ireland) Killian Duffy | Ford Fiesta RRC | 3:48:33.6 | +2:13.3 | 15 |
| 4. (14.) | (Ukraine) Oleksiy Tamrazov | (Ukraine) Pavlo Cherepin | Ford Fiesta RRC | 3:54:03.9 | +7:43.6 | 12 |
| 5. (15.) | (United Arab Emirates) Rashid al Ketbi | (Germany) Karina Hepperle | Škoda Fabia S2000 | 4:05:11.8 | +18:51.5 | 10 |
| 6. (16.) | (Peru) Nicolàs Fuchs | (Argentina) Fernando Mussano | Mitsubishi Lancer Evolution X | 4:07:26.7 | +21:06.4 | 8 |
| 7. (17.) | (Kazakhstan) Arman Smailov | (Russia) Andrei Rusov | Subaru Impreza WRX STi | 4:08:46.1 | +22:25.8 | 6 |
| 8. (18.) | (Ukraine) Valeriy Gorban | (Ukraine) Volodymir Korsia | Mini John Cooper Works S2000 | 4:12:23.1 | +26:02.8 | 4 |
| 9. (19.) | (Ukraine) Oleksiy Kikireshko | (Estonia) Sergei Larens | Mini John Cooper Works S2000 | 4:16:28.2 | +30:07.9 | 2 |
| 10. (20.) | (Argentina) Juan Carlos Alonso | (Argentina) Juan Pablo Monasterolo | Mitsubishi Lancer Evo X | 4:18:51.2 | +32:30.9 | 1 |
Junior WRC
| 1. | (Spain) José Antonio Suárez | (Spain) Cándido Carrera | Ford Fiesta R2 | 4:33:17.8 | 0.0 | 26 |
| 2. | (Sweden) Pontus Tidemand | (Norway) Ola Fløene | Ford Fiesta R2 | 4:34:22.0 | +1:04.2 | 26 |
| 3. | (Estonia) Sander Pärn | (Estonia) Ken Järveoja | Ford Fiesta R2 | 4:41:55.2 | +8:37.4 | 15 |
| 4. | (Switzerland) Michael Burri | (France) Gabin Moreau | Ford Fiesta R2 | 4:49:21.4 | +16:03.6 | 12 |
| 5. | (Finland) Niko-Pekka Nieminen | (Finland) Mikael Korhonen | Ford Fiesta R2 | 4:51:51.2 | +18:33.4 | 10 |
| 6. | (Slovakia) Martin Koči | (Czech Republic) Petr Starý | Ford Fiesta R2 | 4:53:21.7 | +20:03.9 | 9 |
| Ret. | (Spain) Yeray Lemes | (Spain) Rogelio Peñate | Ford Fiesta R2 | - | - | 1 |
