= 2013 WRC3 Championship =

The 2013 FIA WRC3 Championship was the first season of WRC3, a rallying championship organised and governed by the Fédération Internationale de l'Automobile, running in support of the World Rally Championship. It was created when the Group R class of rally car was introduced in 2013.

Unlike its predecessor, the Production Car World Rally Championship, the WRC3 Championship does not have a fixed calendar. Instead, teams and drivers competing in the series are free to contest any of thirteen rallies that form the 2013 World Rally Championship. They must nominate up to six events to score points in, and their best five results from these six events will count towards their final championship points score. The World Rally Championship is open to two-wheel drive cars complying with R1, R2 and R3 regulations.

Also in WRC3, the Citroën Top Driver was established. Within the WRC3, the drivers race in identical Citroën DS3 R3T cars, with the winner receiving the opportunity to race in the Citroën DS3 R5, in the 2014 season.

Sébastien Chardonnet clinched the Drivers' Championship at the Rallye de France-Alsace.

== Teams and drivers ==
The following teams and drivers will take part in the 2013 WRC3 season:

| Team | Car | Tyre | No. | Driver | Co-driver | Class | Rounds |
|---|---|---|---|---|---|---|---|
| (Belgium) MY Racing | Citroën DS3 R3T | M | 51 | (France) Sébastien Chardonnet | (France) Thibault de la Haye | R3T | 1 |
| (Belgium) MY Racing | Citroën DS3 R3T | P | 51 | (France) Sébastien Chardonnet | (France) Thibault de la Haye | R3T | 4, 7–9, 11, 13 |
| (France) PH Sport | Citroën DS3 R3T | P | 52 | (France) Quentin Gilbert | (France) Isabelle Galmiche | R3T | 4, 7–9 |
| (France) PH Sport | Citroën DS3 R3T | P | 52 | (France) Quentin Gilbert | (Belgium) Renaud Jamoul | R3T | 11, 13 |
| (France) Saintéloc Racing | Citroën DS3 R3T | P | 53 | (France) Renaud Poutot | (France) Ludovic Viragh | R3T | 1 |
| (France) Saintéloc Racing | Citroën DS3 R3T | P | 53 | (United Kingdom) Alastair Fisher | (United Kingdom) Gordon Noble | R3T | 4, 7–8 |
| (France) Saintéloc Racing | Citroën DS3 R3T | P | 53 | (France) Jean-Mathieu Leandri | (France) Maxime Vilmot | R3T | 13 |
| (France) Saintéloc Racing | Citroën DS3 R3T | P | 61 | (Italy) Simone Campedelli | (Italy) Matteo Chiarcossi | R3T | 4 |
| (France) Saintéloc Racing | Citroën DS3 R3T | P | 61 | (Italy) Simone Campedelli | (Italy) Danilo Fappani | R3T | 7–9 |
| (Italy) Citroën Procar | Citroën DS3 R3T | P | 56 | (Switzerland) Francesco Parli | (Italy) Tania Canton | R3T | 4, 7 |
| (Italy) Delta Rally | Citroën DS3 R3T | P | 57 | (Switzerland) Federico della Casa | (Switzerland) Marco Menchini | R3T | 4, 7–9 |
| (Italy) Delta Rally | Citroën DS3 R3T | P | 59 | (France) Bryan Bouffier | (France) Xavier Panseri | R3T | 4, 7–8, 13 |
| (Italy) Delta Rally | Citroën DS3 R3T | P | 62 | (France) Stéphane Consani | (France) Maxime Vilmot | R3T | 7 |
| (Italy) Delta Rally | Citroën DS3 R3T | P | 62 | (France) Stéphane Consani | (France) Benjamin Veillas | R3T | 8 |
| (Italy) Delta Rally | Citroën DS3 R3T | P | 62 | (France) Stéphane Consani | (France) Jack Boyere | R3T | 11 |
| (Germany) ADAC Team Weser-Ems | Citroën DS3 R3T | P | 58 | (Germany) Christian Riedemann | (Belgium) Lara Vanneste | R3T | 4, 7–9, 11 |
| (Germany) ADAC Team Weser-Ems | Citroën DS3 R3T | P | 58 | (Finland) Jukka Korhonen | (Finland) Marko Salminen | R3T | 13 |
| (United Kingdom) Charles Hurst Citroën Belfast | Citroën DS3 R3T | P | 60 | (Republic of Ireland) Keith Cronin | (United Kingdom) Marshall Clarke | R3T | 4, 7–9, 11, 13 |
| (Finland) Printsport Racing | Citroën DS3 R3T | P | 63 | (Finland) Jussi Vainionpää | (Finland) Mika Juntunen | R3T | 8 |
| (France) Abu Dhabi Racing | Citroën DS3 R3T | P | 64 | (United Arab Emirates) Mohamed Al Mutawaa | (United Kingdom) Stephen McAuley | R3T | 9, 12 |
| (France) Abu Dhabi Racing | Citroën DS3 R3T | P | 67 | (United Arab Emirates) Mohamed Al Sahlawi | (United Kingdom) Allan Harryman | R3T | 12 |
| (Spain) Autogomas Cantabria | Citroën DS3 R3T | P | 65 | (Spain) Enrique García Ojeda | (Spain) Borja Odriozola | R3T | 11–12 |

| Icon | Class |
|---|---|
| R1 | Classification within Group R^{‡} |
| R2 | Classification within Group R^{‡} |
| R3 | Classification within Group R^{‡} |

Notes:

- ^‡ — Additional letters refer to the specific designation of a car within each class under Group R rules.

=== Driver changes ===
- After contesting the Rallye Monte Carlo in the WRC class, Bryan Bouffier entered the WRC3 series.
- Sébastien Chardonnet will enter a Citroën DS3 built to R3T specifications and run with the support of the Citroën World Rally Team. Chardonnet had previously contested the 2012 Rallye de France — Alsace in a WRC-spec DS3.
- Three-time British Rally Champion Keith Cronin entered a Citroën DS3 R3T at selected events.

== Rally summaries ==
| Round | Rally name | Podium finishers | | | | | | Statistics | | |
| Round | Rally name | Pos. | No. | Driver | Entrant | Time | Stages | Length | Starters | Finishers |
|---|---|---|---|---|---|---|---|---|---|---|
| 1 | (Monaco) Monte Carlo Rally (15–20 January) — Results and report | 1 | 51 | (France) Sébastien Chardonnet (France) Thibault de la Haye | (Belgium) MY Racing (Citroën DS3 R3T) | 6:04:28.2 | (18)^{†} 16 | (478.42 km)^{†} 436.02 km | 2 | 1 |
| 1 | (Monaco) Monte Carlo Rally (15–20 January) — Results and report | — | 53 | (France) Renaud Poutot (France) Ludovic Viragh | (France) Saintéloc Racing (Citroën DS3 R3T) | DNF | (18)^{†} 16 | (478.42 km)^{†} 436.02 km | 2 | 1 |
| 1 | (Monaco) Monte Carlo Rally (15–20 January) — Results and report | — | 52 | (France) Quentin Gilbert (France) Isabelle Galmiche | (France) PH Sport (Citroën DS3 R3T) | Withdrawn | (18)^{†} 16 | (478.42 km)^{†} 436.02 km | 2 | 1 |
| 2 | Rally Sweden (8–10 February) — Results and report | No WRC3 entries | | | | | 22 | 297.78 km | —N/a | —N/a |
| 3 | Rally Mexico (8–10 March) — Results and report | No WRC3 entries | | | | | 23 | 396.82 km | —N/a | —N/a |
| 4 | Rally de Portugal (12–14 April) — Results and report | 1 | 59 | (France) Bryan Bouffier (France) Xavier Panseri | (Italy) Delta Rally (Citroën DS3 R3T) | 4:38:52.5 | 15 | 386.73 km | 9 | 6 |
| 4 | Rally de Portugal (12–14 April) — Results and report | 2 | 51 | (France) Sébastien Chardonnet (France) Thibault de la Haye | (Belgium) MY Racing (Citroën DS3 R3T) | 4:48:59.1 | 15 | 386.73 km | 9 | 6 |
| 4 | Rally de Portugal (12–14 April) — Results and report | 3 | 52 | (France) Quentin Gilbert (France) Isabelle Galmiche | (France) PH Sport (Citroën DS3 R3T) | 5:04:43.8 | 15 | 386.73 km | 9 | 6 |
| 5 | Rally Argentina (3–5 May) — Results and report | No WRC3 entries | | | | | 14 | 407.64 km | —N/a | —N/a |
| 6 | (Greece) Acropolis Rally (31 May–2 June) — Results and report | No WRC3 entries | | | | | 14 | 306.53 km | —N/a | —N/a |
| 7 | (Italy) Rally Italia Sardegna (21–23 June) — Results and report | 1 | 58 | (Germany) Christian Riedemann (Belgium) Lara Vanneste | (Germany) ADAC Team Weser Ems (Citroën DS3 R3T) | 3:52:39.9 | 16 | 304.50 km | 10 | 9 |
| 7 | (Italy) Rally Italia Sardegna (21–23 June) — Results and report | 2 | 60 | (Republic of Ireland) Keith Cronin (United Kingdom) Marshall Clarke | (United Kingdom) Charles Hurst Citroën Belfast (Citroën DS3 R3T) | 3:57:45.3 | 16 | 304.50 km | 10 | 9 |
| 7 | (Italy) Rally Italia Sardegna (21–23 June) — Results and report | 3 | 52 | (France) Quentin Gilbert (France) Isabelle Galmiche | (France) PH Sport (Citroën DS3 R3T) | 4:01:59.2 | 16 | 304.50 km | 10 | 9 |
| 8 | Rally Finland (1–3 August) — Results and report | 1 | 60 | (Republic of Ireland) Keith Cronin (United Kingdom) Marshall Clarke | (United Kingdom) Charles Hurst Citroën Belfast (Citroën DS3 R3T) | 3:06:35.4 | 23 | 324.21 km | 9 | 6 |
| 8 | Rally Finland (1–3 August) — Results and report | 2 | 51 | (France) Sébastien Chardonnet (France) Thibault de la Haye | (Belgium) MY Racing (Citroën DS3 R3T) | 3:07:49.9 | 23 | 324.21 km | 9 | 6 |
| 8 | Rally Finland (1–3 August) — Results and report | 3 | 63 | (Finland) Jussi Vainionpää (Finland) Mika Juntunen | (Finland) Printsport Racing (Citroën DS3 R3T) | 3:09:18.5 | 23 | 324.21 km | 9 | 6 |
| 9 | (Germany) Rallye Deutschland (23–25 August) — Results and report | 1 | 51 | (France) Sébastien Chardonnet (France) Thibault de la Haye | (Belgium) MY Racing (Citroën DS3 R3T) | 3:39:32.6 | (16)^{†} 15 | (371.86 km)^{†} 330.78 km | 7 | 5 |
| 9 | (Germany) Rallye Deutschland (23–25 August) — Results and report | 2 | 60 | (Republic of Ireland) Keith Cronin (United Kingdom) Marshall Clarke | (United Kingdom) Charles Hurst Citroën Belfast (Citroën DS3 R3T) | 3:41:56.9 | (16)^{†} 15 | (371.86 km)^{†} 330.78 km | 7 | 5 |
| 9 | (Germany) Rallye Deutschland (23–25 August) — Results and report | 3 | 58 | (Germany) Christian Riedemann (Belgium) Lara Vanneste | (Germany) ADAC Team Weser Ems (Citroën DS3 R3T) | 4:02:20.3 | (16)^{†} 15 | (371.86 km)^{†} 330.78 km | 7 | 5 |
| 10 | Rally Australia (13–15 September) — Results and report | No WRC3 entries | | | | | 22 | 352.36 km | —N/a | —N/a |
| 11 | Rallye de France Alsace (4–7 October) — Results and report | 1 | 52 | (France) Quentin Gilbert (France) Isabelle Galmiche | (France) PH Sport (Citroën DS3 R3T) | 3:12:51.2 | 22 | 312.14 km | 6 | 4 |
| 11 | Rallye de France Alsace (4–7 October) — Results and report | 2 | 51 | (France) Sébastien Chardonnet (France) Thibault de la Haye | (Belgium) MY Racing (Citroën DS3 R3T) | 3:13:45.1 | 22 | 312.14 km | 6 | 4 |
| 11 | Rallye de France Alsace (4–7 October) — Results and report | 3 | 60 | (Republic of Ireland) Keith Cronin (United Kingdom) Marshall Clarke | (United Kingdom) Charles Hurst Citroën Belfast (Citroën DS3 R3T) | 3:15:23.8 | 22 | 312.14 km | 6 | 4 |
| 12 | (Spain) Rally Catalunya (25–27 October) — Results and report | 1 | 65 | (Spain) Enrique García Ojeda (Spain) Borja Odriozola | (Spain) Autogomas Cantabria (Citroën DS3 R3T) | 3:57:11.8 | 15 | 355.92 km | 3 | 3 |
| 12 | (Spain) Rally Catalunya (25–27 October) — Results and report | 2 | 64 | (United Arab Emirates) Mohamed Al Mutawaa (United Kingdom) Stephen McAuley | (France) Abu Dhabi Racing (Citroën DS3 R3T) | 4:14:07.1 | 15 | 355.92 km | 3 | 3 |
| 12 | (Spain) Rally Catalunya (25–27 October) — Results and report | 3 | 67 | (United Arab Emirates) Mohamed Al Sahlawi (United Kingdom) Allan Harryman | (France) Abu Dhabi Racing (Citroën DS3 R3T) | 4:27:34.8 | 15 | 355.92 km | 3 | 3 |
| 13 | (United Kingdom) Wales Rally GB (15–17 November) — Results and report | 1 | 58 | (Finland) Jukka Korhonen (Finland) Marko Salminen | (Germany) ADAC Team Weser Ems; Citroën DS3 R3T | 3:48:32.7 | 22 | 311.15 km | 4 | 2 |
| 13 | (United Kingdom) Wales Rally GB (15–17 November) — Results and report | 2 | 60 | (Republic of Ireland) Keith Cronin (United Kingdom) Marshall Clarke | (United Kingdom) Charles Hurst Citroën Belfast (Citroën DS3 R3T) | 3:56:14.3 | 22 | 311.15 km | 4 | 2 |
| 13 | (United Kingdom) Wales Rally GB (15–17 November) — Results and report | 3 | 59 | (France) Bryan Bouffier (France) Xavier Panseri | (Italy) Delta Rally (Citroën DS3 R3T) | DNF | 22 | 311.15 km | 4 | 2 |

== Championship standings ==
=== Drivers' championship ===
Points are awarded to the top 10 classified finishers.

| Position | 1st | 2nd | 3rd | 4th | 5th | 6th | 7th | 8th | 9th | 10th |
| Points | 25 | 18 | 15 | 12 | 10 | 8 | 6 | 4 | 2 | 1 |

| Pos. | Driver | MON (Monaco) | SWE (Sweden) | MEX (Mexico) | POR (Portugal) | ARG (Argentina) | GRE (Greece) | ITA (Italy) | FIN (Finland) | GER (Germany) | AUS (Australia) | FRA (France) | ESP (Spain) | GBR (United Kingdom) | Drops | Points |
|---|---|---|---|---|---|---|---|---|---|---|---|---|---|---|---|---|
| 1 | (France) Sébastien Chardonnet | 1 | | | 2 | | | 4 | 2 | 1 | | 2 | | | 12 | 104 |
| 2 | (Republic of Ireland) Keith Cronin | | | | 5 | | | 2 | 1 | 2 | | 3 | | 2 | 10 | 94 |
| 3 | (France) Quentin Gilbert | WD | | | 3 | | | 3 | 5 | 5 | | 1 | | | | 75 |
| 4 | (Germany) Christian Riedemann | | | | Ret | | | 1 | Ret | 3 | | 4 | | | | 52 |
| 5 | (United Arab Emirates) Mohamed Al Mutawaa | | | | | | | | | 4 | | | 2 | | | 30 |
| 6 | (France) Bryan Bouffier | | | | 1 | | | 8 | WD | | | | | Ret | | 29 |
| 7 | (Spain) Enrique García Ojeda | | | | | | | | | | | Ret | 1 | | | 25 |
| 8 | (Finland) Jukka Korhonen | | | | | | | | | | | | | 1 | | 25 |
| 9 | (Italy) Simone Campedelli | | | | 6 | | | Ret | 4 | Ret | | | | | | 20 |
| 10 | (Finland) Jussi Vainionpää | | | | | | | | 3 | | | | | | | 15 |
| 11 | (United Arab Emirates) Mohamed Al Sahlawi | | | | | | | | | | | | 3 | | | 15 |
| 12 | (United Kingdom) Alastair Fisher | | | | 4 | | | 9 | Ret | WD | | | | | | 14 |
| 13 | (Switzerland) Federico della Casa | | | | Ret | | | 5 | Ret | Ret | | | | | | 10 |
| 14 | (Switzerland) Francesco Parli | | | | Ret | | | 7 | WD | | | | | | | 6 |
| EX | (France) Stéphane Consani | | | | | | | 6 | 6 | | | WD† | | | | 0† |
| Pos. | Driver | MON (Monaco) | SWE (Sweden) | MEX (Mexico) | POR (Portugal) | ARG (Argentina) | GRE (Greece) | ITA (Italy) | FIN (Finland) | GER (Germany) | AUS (Australia) | FRA (France) | ESP (Spain) | GBR (United Kingdom) | Drops | Points |

Key
| Colour | Result |
|---|---|
| Gold | Winner |
| Silver | 2nd place |
| Bronze | 3rd place |
| Green | Points finish |
| Blue | Non-points finish |
| Blue | Non-classified finish (NC) |
| Purple | Did not finish (Ret) |
| Black | Excluded (EX) |
| Black | Disqualified (DSQ) |
| White | Did not start (DNS) |
| White | Cancelled (C) |
| Blank | Withdrew entry from the event (WD) |

- † – Stéphane Consani admitted illegally recceing a Rallye de France-Alsace stage on the month of October. This action result on the rally stewards having his points withdrawn and was suspended from the final two rounds of the season.

=== Co-Drivers' Championship ===
| Pos. | Driver | MON (Monaco) | SWE (Sweden) | MEX (Mexico) | POR (Portugal) | ARG (Argentina) | GRE (Greece) | ITA (Italy) | FIN (Finland) | GER (Germany) | AUS (Australia) | FRA (France) | ESP (Spain) | GBR (United Kingdom) | Drops | Points |
|---|---|---|---|---|---|---|---|---|---|---|---|---|---|---|---|---|
| 1 | (France) Thibault de la Haye | 1 | | | 2 | | | 4 | 2 | 1 | | 2 | | | 12 | 104 |
| 2 | (United Kingdom) Marshall Clarke | | | | 5 | | | 2 | 1 | 2 | | 3 | | 2 | 10 | 94 |
| 3 | (Belgium) Lara Vanneste | | | | Ret | | | 1 | Ret | 3 | | 4 | | | | 52 |
| 4 | (France) Isabelle Galmiche | WD | | | 3 | | | 3 | 5 | 5 | | | | | | 50 |
| 5 | (United Kingdom) Stephen McAuley | | | | | | | | | 4 | | | 2 | | | 30 |
| 6 | (France) Xavier Panseri | | | | 1 | | | 8 | | | | | | Ret | | 29 |
| 7 | (Belgium) Jamoul Renaud | | | | | | | | | | | 1 | | | | 25 |
| 8 | (Spain) Borja Odriozola | | | | | | | | | | | Ret | 1 | | | 25 |
| 9 | (Finland) Marko Salminen | | | | | | | | | | | | | 1 | | 25 |
| 10 | (France) Maxime Vilmot | | | | | | | 6 | 6 | | | | | Ret | | 16 |
| 11 | (Finland) Mika Juntunen | | | | | | | | 3 | | | | | | | 15 |
| 12 | (United Kingdom) Allan Harryman | | | | | | | | | | | | 3 | | | 15 |
| 13 | (United Kingdom) Gordon Noble | | | | 4 | | | 9 | Ret | WD | | | | | | 14 |
| 14 | (Italy) Danilo Fappani | | | | | | | Ret | 4 | Ret | | | | | | 12 |
| 15 | (Switzerland) Marco Menchini | | | | Ret | | | 5 | Ret | Ret | | | | | | 10 |
| 16 | (Italy) Matteo Chiarcossi | | | | 6 | | | | | | | | | | | 8 |
| 17 | (Italy) Tania Canton | | | | Ret | | | 7 | WD | | | | | | | 6 |
| Pos. | Driver | MON (Monaco) | SWE (Sweden) | MEX (Mexico) | POR (Portugal) | ARG (Argentina) | GRE (Greece) | ITA (Italy) | FIN (Finland) | GER (Germany) | AUS (Australia) | FRA (France) | ESP (Spain) | GBR (United Kingdom) | Drops | Points |

Key
| Colour | Result |
|---|---|
| Gold | Winner |
| Silver | 2nd place |
| Bronze | 3rd place |
| Green | Points finish |
| Blue | Non-points finish |
| Blue | Non-classified finish (NC) |
| Purple | Did not finish (Ret) |
| Black | Excluded (EX) |
| Black | Disqualified (DSQ) |
| White | Did not start (DNS) |
| White | Cancelled (C) |
| Blank | Withdrew entry from the event (WD) |

=== Teams' Championship ===
| Pos. | Team | No. | MON (Monaco) | SWE (Sweden) | MEX (Mexico) | POR (Portugal) | ARG (Argentina) | GRE (Greece) | ITA (Italy) | FIN (Finland) | GER (Germany) | AUS (Australia) | FRA (France) | ESP (Spain) | GBR (United Kingdom) | Drops | Points |
|---|---|---|---|---|---|---|---|---|---|---|---|---|---|---|---|---|---|
| 1 | (United Kingdom) Charles Hurst Citroën Belfast | 60 | | | | 2 | | | 2 | 1 | 1 | | 1 | | 2 | 18 | 111 |
| 2 | (Germany) ADAC Team Weser-Ems | 58 | | | | Ret | | | 1 | Ret | 2 | | 2 | | 1 | 0 | 86 |
| 3 | (France) Saintéloc Racing | 53 | Ret | | | 1 | | | 3 | Ret | WD | | | | Ret | 0 | 73 |
| 3 | (France) Saintéloc Racing | 61 | | | | 3 | | | Ret | 2 | Ret | | | | | 0 | 73 |
| 4 | (Spain) Autogomas Cantabria | 65 | | | | | | | | | | | Ret | 1 | | | 25 |
| Pos. | Team | No. | MON (Monaco) | SWE (Sweden) | MEX (Mexico) | POR (Portugal) | ARG (Argentina) | GRE (Greece) | ITA (Italy) | FIN (Finland) | GER (Germany) | AUS (Australia) | FRA (France) | ESP (Spain) | GBR (United Kingdom) | Drops | Points |
