= 2013 Rally de Portugal =

Car rally

2013 Rally Portugal 47º Rally de Portugal
Round 4 of the 2013 World Rally Championship season
← Previous event	Next event →
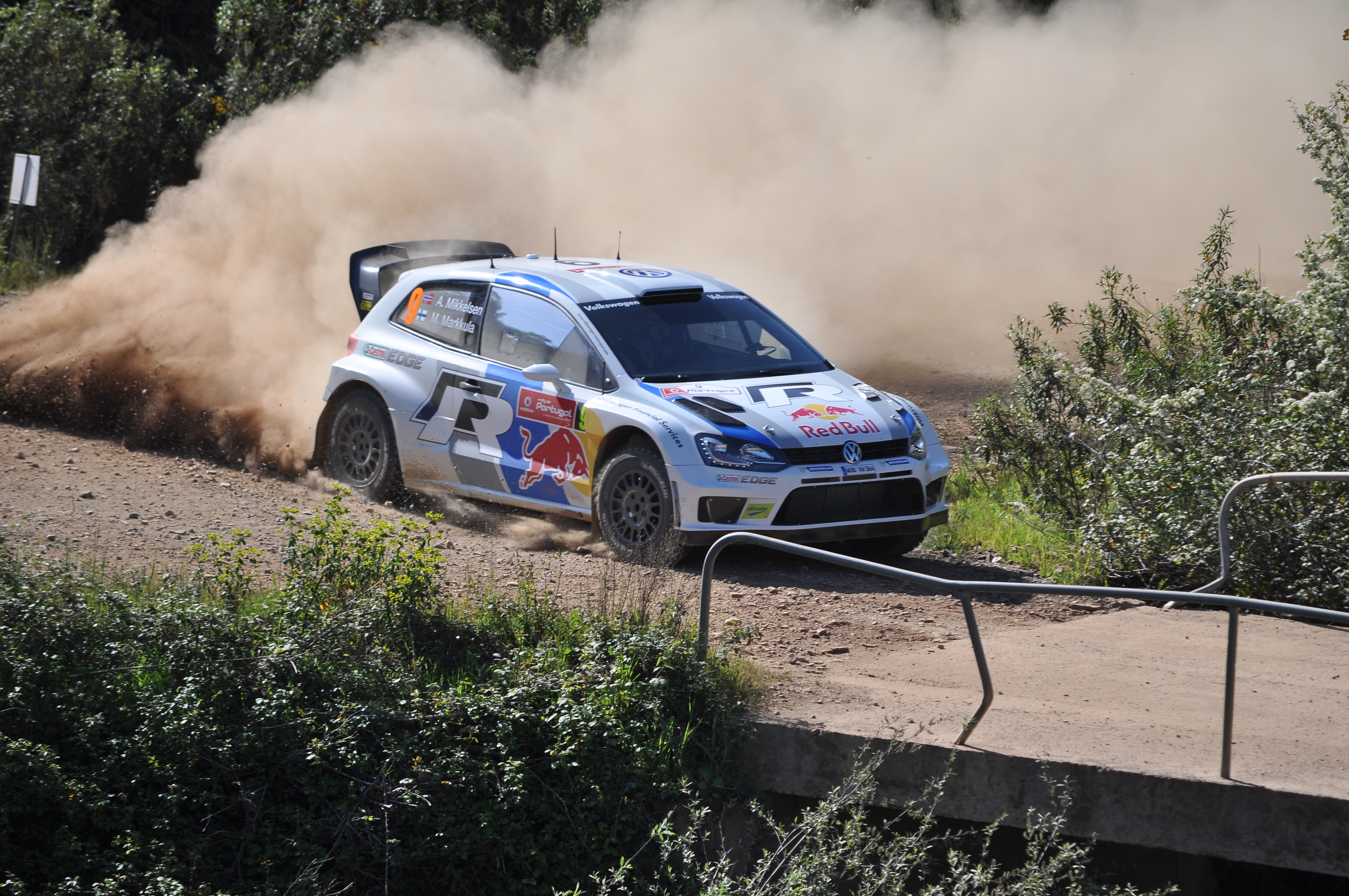
- Andreas Mikkelsen during Rally
- Host country: Portugal
- Rally base: Faro, Portugal
- Dates run: April 11 – April 14, 2013
- Stages: 15 (386.73 km; 240.30 miles)
- Stage surface: Gravel
- Overall distance: 163,092 km (101,341 miles)

Statistics
- Crews: 70 at start, 38 (+ 8 J-WRC) at finish

Overall results
- Overall winner: (France) Sébastien Ogier (Germany) Volkswagen Motorsport

The 2013 Rally de Portugal was the fourth round of the 2013 World Rally Championship season. The event was based in Faro, Portugal, and started on 11 April and was concluded on 14 April after fifteen special stages, totaling 387 competitive kilometres, including a street stage in Lisbon on 12 April.

== Report ==
=== Before the rally ===
The rally was preceded by the "Fafe Rally Sprint", a single-stage exhibition event run over the famous Fafe stages in the country's north which was won by Citroën Total Abu Dhabi WRT driver Dani Sordo. Dani Sordo won the rally's qualifying stage (5 km) and elected to run thirteenth (last WRC) on the road as a result. His strategy was followed by all competitors, resulting in an inverted starting order for the rally's first day.

== Entry list ==
Thirteen World Rally Cars were entered into the event, as were twenty entries in the newly formed WRC-2 championship for cars built to Group N and Super 2000 regulations and nine WRC-3 entries. There was also ten entries in the debut of the Junior WRC.

Notable entrants
No.	Entrant	Class	Driver	Co-driver	Car	Tyre
2	(France) Citroën Total Abu Dhabi WRT	WRC	(Finland) Mikko Hirvonen	(Finland) Jarmo Lehtinen	Citroën DS3 WRC	M
3	(France) Citroën Total Abu Dhabi WRT	WRC	(Spain) Dani Sordo	(Spain) Carlos del Barrio	Citroën DS3 WRC	M
4	(United Kingdom) Qatar M-Sport WRT	WRC	(Norway) Mads Østberg	(Sweden) Jonas Andersson	Ford Fiesta RS WRC	M
5	(United Kingdom) Qatar M-Sport WRT	WRC	(Russia) Evgeny Novikov	(Austria) Ilka Minor	Ford Fiesta RS WRC	M
6	(United Kingdom) Qatar World Rally Team	WRC	(Qatar) Nasser Al-Attiyah	(Italy) Giovanni Bernacchini	Ford Fiesta RS WRC	M
7	(Germany) Volkswagen Motorsport	WRC	(Finland) Jari-Matti Latvala	(Finland) Miikka Anttila	Volkswagen Polo R WRC	M
8	(Germany) Volkswagen Motorsport	WRC	(France) Sébastien Ogier	(France) Julien Ingrassia	Volkswagen Polo R WRC	M
9	(Germany) Volkswagen Motorsport II	WRC	(Norway) Andreas Mikkelsen	(Finland) Mikko Markkula	Volkswagen Polo R WRC	M
10	(France) Abu Dhabi Citroën Total WRT	WRC	(United Arab Emirates) Khalid Al Qassimi	(United Kingdom) Scott Martin	Citroën DS3 WRC	M
11	(United Kingdom) Qatar World Rally Team	WRC	(Belgium) Thierry Neuville	(Belgium) Nicolas Gilsoul	Ford Fiesta RS WRC	M
12	(Italy) Lotos Team WRC	WRC	(Poland) Michał Kościuszko	(Poland) Maciej Szczepaniak	Mini John Cooper Works WRC	D
15	(United Kingdom) Qatar World Rally Team	WRC	(Netherlands) Dennis Kuipers	(Belgium) Robin Buysmans	Ford Fiesta RS WRC	M
21	(Czech Republic) Jipocar Czech National Team	WRC	(Czech Republic) Martin Prokop	(Czech Republic) Michal Ernst	Ford Fiesta RS WRC	D
31	(Czech Republic) Škoda Motorsport	WRC-2	(Finland) Esapekka Lappi	(Finland) Janne Ferm	Škoda Fabia S2000	M
32	(Germany) Škoda Auto Deutschland	WRC-2	(Germany) Sepp Wiegand	(Germany) Frank Christian	Škoda Fabia S2000	M
36	(United Arab Emirates) Skydive Dubai Rally Team	WRC-2	(United Arab Emirates) Rashid al Ketbi	(Germany) Karina Hepperle	Škoda Fabia S2000	D
37	(Italy) Lorenzo Bertelli	WRC-2	(Italy) Lorenzo Bertelli	(Italy) Lorenzo Granai	Subaru Impreza WRX STi	M
40	(Kazakhstan) Arman Smailov	WRC-2	(Kazakhstan) Arman Smailov	(Russia) Andrei Rusov	Subaru Impreza WRX STi	M
41	(Peru) Nicolàs Fuchs	WRC-2	(Peru) Nicolàs Fuchs	(Argentina) Fernando Mussano	Mitsubishi Lancer Evolution X	D
45	(Spain) Alexander Villanueva	WRC-2	(Spain) Alexander Villanueva	(Spain) Oscar Sanchez	Mitsubishi Lancer Evo X	M
46	(Italy) Marco Vallario	WRC-2	(Italy) Marco Vallario	(Italy) Antonio Pascale	Mitsubishi Lancer Evo X	D
48	Seashore Qatar Rally Team	WRC-2	(Qatar) Abdulaziz Al-Kuwari	(Republic of Ireland) Killian Duffy	Ford Fiesta RRC	M
49	(Ukraine) Mentos Ascania Racing	WRC-2	(Ukraine) Oleksiy Kikireshko	(Estonia) Sergei Larens	Mini John Cooper Works S2000	P
50	(Ukraine) Mentos Ascania Racing	WRC-2	(Ukraine) Valeriy Gorban	(Ukraine) Volodymir Korsia	Mini John Cooper Works S2000	P
51	(France) Sébastien Chardonnet	WRC-3	(France) Sébastien Chardonnet	(France) Thibault de la Haye	Citroën DS3 R3T	M
52	(France) Quentin Gilbert	WRC-3	(France) Quentin Gilbert	(France) Isabelle Galmiche	Citroën DS3 R3T	P
53	(France) Saintéloc Racing	WRC-3	(United Kingdom) Alastair Fisher	(United Kingdom) Gordon Noble	Citroën DS3 R3T	P
56	(Switzerland) Francesco Parli	WRC-3	(Switzerland) Francesco Parli	(Italy) Tania Canton	Citroën DS3 R3T	P
57	(Switzerland) Federico Della Casa	WRC-3	(Switzerland) Federico Della Casa	(Switzerland) Marco Menchini	Citroën DS3 R3T	P
58	(Germany) ADAC Team Weser-Ems	WRC-3	(Germany) Christian Riedemann	(Belgium) Lara Vanneste	Citroën DS3 R3T	P
59	(France) Bryan Bouffier	WRC-3	(France) Bryan Bouffier	(France) Xavier Panseri	Citroën DS3 R3T	P
60	(United Kingdom) Charles Hurst Citroën Belfast	WRC-3	(Republic of Ireland) Keith Cronin	(United Kingdom) Marshall Clarke	Citroën DS3 R3T	P
61	(France) Saintéloc Racing	WRC-3	(Italy) Simone Campedelli	(Italy) Matteo Chiarcossi	Citroën DS3 R3T	P
71	(Jordan) Motortune Racing	WRC-2	(Jordan) Ala'a Rasheed	(Lebanon) Joseph Matar	Ford Fiesta RRC	M
72	(Argentina) Juan Carlos Alonso	WRC-2	(Argentina) Juan Carlos Alonso	(Argentina) Juan Pablo Monasterolo	Mitsubishi Lancer Evo X	D
73	(Russia) Nikita Kondrakhin	WRC-2	(Russia) Nikita Kondrakhin	(Italy) Danilo Fappani	Škoda Fabia S2000	M
74	(Poland) Robert Kubica	WRC-2	(Poland) Robert Kubica	(Poland) Maciek Baran	Citroën DS3 RRC	M
75	(United Kingdom) Qatar M-Sport World Rally Team	WRC-2	(United Kingdom) Elfyn Evans	(United Kingdom) Daniel Barritt	Ford Fiesta RRC	M
76	(Indonesia) Bosowa Rally Team	WRC-2	(Indonesia) Subhan Aksa	(Italy) Nicola Arena	Ford Fiesta RRC	M
77	(Italy) Top Run SRL	WRC-2	(Argentina) Marcos Ligato	(Argentina) Rubén García	Subaru Impreza WRX STi	M
78	(Italy) E2 Tre Colli World Rally Team	WRC-2	(Italy) Edoardo Bresolin	(Italy) Rudy Pollet	Ford Fiesta RRC	M
79	(Republic of Ireland) Robert Barrable	WRC-2	(Republic of Ireland) Robert Barrable	(United Kingdom) Stuart Loudon	Ford Fiesta S2000	D
100	(Estonia) Sander Pärn	J-WRC	(Estonia) Sander Pärn	(Estonia) Ken Järveoja	Ford Fiesta R2	H
102	(Sweden) Pontus Tidemand	J-WRC	(Sweden) Pontus Tidemand	(Norway) Ola Fløene	Ford Fiesta R2	H
103	(Slovakia) Styllex Motorsport	J-WRC	(Slovakia) Martin Koči	(Czech Republic) Petr Starý	Ford Fiesta R2	H
104	(Finland) Andreas Amberg	J-WRC	(Finland) Andreas Amberg	(Finland) Mikko Lukka	Ford Fiesta R2	H
105	(Spain) ACSM Rallye Team	J-WRC	(Spain) José Antonio Suárez	(Spain) Cándido Carrera	Ford Fiesta R2	H
106	(Turkey) Castrol Ford Team Türkiye	J-WRC	(Turkey) Murat Bostancı	(Turkey) Onur Vatansever	Ford Fiesta R2	H
107	(Switzerland) Michaël Burri	J-WRC	(Switzerland) Michaël Burri	(France) Gabin Moreau	Ford Fiesta R2	H
108	(Finland) Niko-Pekka Nieminen	J-WRC	(Finland) Niko-Pekka Nieminen	(Finland) Mikael Korhonen	Ford Fiesta R2	H
109	(Norway) Marius Aasen	J-WRC	(Norway) Marius Aasen	(Norway) Marlene Engan	Ford Fiesta R2	H
110	(Spain) Yeray Lemes	J-WRC	(Spain) Yeray Lemes	(Spain) Rogelio Peñate	Ford Fiesta R2	H

Icon	Class
WRC	WRC entries eligible to score manufacturer points
WRC	Major entry ineligible to score manufacturer points
WRC-2	Registered to take part in WRC-2 championship
WRC-3	Registered to take part in WRC-3 championship
J-WRC	Registered to take part in Junior WRC championship

== Results ==
=== Event standings ===
Pos.	Driver	Co-driver	Car	Time	Difference	Points
Overall Classification
1.	(France) Sébastien Ogier	(France) Julien Ingrassia	Volkswagen Polo R WRC	4:07:38.7	0.0	28
2.	(Finland) Mikko Hirvonen	(Finland) Jarmo Lehtinen	Citroën DS3 WRC	4:08:36.9	58.2	18
3.	(Finland) Jari-Matti Latvala	(Finland) Miikka Anttila	Volkswagen Polo R WRC	4:11:43.2	4:04.5	16
4.	(Russia) Evgeny Novikov	(Austria) Ilka Minor	Ford Fiesta RS WRC	4:13:06.4	5:27.7	12
5.	(Qatar) Nasser Al-Attiyah	(Italy) Giovanni Bernacchini	Ford Fiesta RS WRC	4:15:22.2	7:43.5	10
6.	(Norway) Andreas Mikkelsen	(Finland) Mikko Markkula	Volkswagen Polo R WRC	4:17:18.5	9:39.8	8
7.	(Czech Republic) Martin Prokop	(Czech Republic) Michal Ernst	Ford Fiesta RS WRC	4:22:42.9	15:04.2	6
8.	(Norway) Mads Østberg	(Sweden) Jonas Andersson	Ford Fiesta RS WRC	4:23:22.3	15:43.6	6
9.	(United Arab Emirates) Khalid Al Qassimi	(United Kingdom) Scott Martin	Citroën DS3 WRC	4:23:35.6	15:56.9	2
10. (1. WRC-2)	(Finland) Esapekka Lappi	(Finland) Janne Ferm	Škoda Fabia S2000	4:23:59.7	16:21.0	1
WRC-2
1. (10.)	(Finland) Esapekka Lappi	(Finland) Janne Ferm	Škoda Fabia S2000	4:23:59.7	0:00.0	25
2. (11.)	(Republic of Ireland) Robert Barrable	(United Kingdom) Stuart Loudon	Ford Fiesta S2000	4:35:36.2	11:36.5	18
3. (14.)	(Germany) Sepp Wiegand	(Germany) Frank Christian	Škoda Fabia S2000	4:39:02.8	15:03.1	15
4. (15.)	(Peru) Nicolàs Fuchs	(Argentina) Fernando Mussano	Mitsubishi Lancer Evolution X	4:43:25.5	19:25.8	12
5. (16.)	(Qatar) Abdulaziz Al-Kuwari	(Republic of Ireland) Killian Duffy	Ford Fiesta RRC	4:45:33.1	21:33.4	10
6. (19.)	(Poland) Robert Kubica	(Poland) Maciek Baran	Citroën DS3 RRC	4:47:10.9	23:11.2	8
7. (22.)	(Italy) Edoardo Bresolin	(Italy) Rudy Pollet	Ford Fiesta RRC	4:50:36.1	26:36.4	6
8. (23.)	(United Kingdom) Elfyn Evans	(United Kingdom) Daniel Barritt	Ford Fiesta RRC	4:53:11.1	29:11.4	4
9. (24.)	(Argentina) Juan Carlos Alonso	(Argentina) Juan Pablo Monasterolo	Mitsubishi Lancer Evo X	4:55:24.3	31:24.6	2
10. (25.)	(Kazakhstan) Arman Smailov	(Russia) Andrei Rusov	Subaru Impreza WRX STi	4:58:52.5	34:52.8	1
WRC-3
1. (13.)	(France) Bryan Bouffier	(France) Xavier Panseri	Citroën DS3 R3T	4:38:52.5	0:00.0	25
2. (20.)	(France) Sébastien Chardonnet	(France) Thibault de la Haye	Citroën DS3 R3T	4:48:59.1	10:06.6	18
3. (26.)	(France) Quentin Gilbert	(France) Isabelle Galmiche	Citroën DS3 R3T	5:04:43.8	25:51.3	15
4. (28.)	(United Kingdom) Alastair Fisher	(United Kingdom) Gordon Noble	Citroën DS3 R3T	5:04:43.8	25:51.3	12
5. (31.)	(Republic of Ireland) Keith Cronin	(United Kingdom) Marshall Clarke	Citroën DS3 R3T	5:04:43.8	25:51.3	10
6. (32.)	(Italy) Simone Campedelli	(Italy) Matteo Chiarcossi	Citroën DS3 R3T	5:04:43.8	25:51.3	8
Junior WRC^{†}
1.	(Sweden) Pontus Tidemand	(Norway) Ola Fløene	Ford Fiesta R2	3:01:23.6	0.0	30
2.	(Spain) José Antonio Suárez	(Spain) Cándido Carrera	Ford Fiesta R2	3:03:50.5	2:26.9	20
3.	(Spain) Yeray Lemes	(Spain) Rogelio Peñate	Ford Fiesta R2	3:04:34.3	3:10.7	17
4.	(Finland) Andreas Amberg	(Finland) Mikko Lukka	Ford Fiesta R2	3:06:51.5	5:27.9	12
5.	(Slovakia) Martin Koči	(Czech Republic) Petr Starý	Ford Fiesta R2	3:07:21.5	5:57.9	10
6.	(Norway) Marius Aasen	(Norway) Marlene Engan	Ford Fiesta R2	3:11:10.1	9:46.5	9
7.	(Finland) Niko-Pekka Nieminen	(Finland) Mikael Korhonen	Ford Fiesta R2	3:12:46.6	11:23.0	6
8.	(Estonia) Sander Pärn	(Estonia) Ken Järveoja	Ford Fiesta R2	3:34:32.1	33:08.5	4

^† – The Junior WRC features only the first 11 stages of the rally.

=== Special stages ===
Day	Stage	Name	Length	Winner	Time	Rally leader
Leg 1 (12 Abr)	SS1	Mu 1	20.32 km	(France) Sébastien Ogier	12:36.4	(France) Sébastien Ogier
Leg 1 (12 Abr)	SS2	Ourique 1	18.32 km	(Norway) Mads Østberg	10:42.7	(Norway) Mads Østberg
Leg 1 (12 Abr)	SS3	Mu 2	20.32 km	(Spain) Dani Sordo	12:31.4	(France) Sébastien Ogier
Leg 1 (12 Abr)	SS4	Ourique 2	18.32 km	(Spain) Dani Sordo	10:36.1	(France) Sébastien Ogier
Leg 1 (12 Abr)	SS5	SSS Lisboa	3,27 km	(Finland) Mikko Hirvonen	2:53.6	(France) Sébastien Ogier
Leg 2 (13 Abr)	SS6	Santana da Serra 1	31.12 km	(Finland) Jari-Matti Latvala	22:13.2	(France) Sébastien Ogier
Leg 2 (13 Abr)	SS7	Vascão 1	25.37 km	(Finland) Jari-Matti Latvala	16:14.9	(France) Sébastien Ogier
Leg 2 (13 Abr)	SS8	Loulé 1	22.78 km	(France) Sébastien Ogier	15:23.4	(France) Sébastien Ogier
Leg 2 (13 Abr)	SS9	Santana da Serra 2	31.12 km	(France) Sébastien Ogier	22:02.7	(France) Sébastien Ogier
Leg 2 (13 Abr)	SS10	Vascão 2	25.37 km	(France) Sébastien Ogier	16:08.2	(France) Sébastien Ogier
Leg 2 (13 Abr)	SS11	Loulé 2	22.78 km	(France) Sébastien Ogier	15:18.4	(France) Sébastien Ogier
Leg 3 (14 Abr)	SS12	Silves 1	21.52 km	(Norway) Mads Østberg	12:05.0	(France) Sébastien Ogier
Leg 3 (14 Abr)	SS13	Almodôvar 1	52.30 km	(Norway) Mads Østberg	33:05.2	(France) Sébastien Ogier
Leg 3 (14 Abr)	SS14	Silves 2	21.52 km	(Norway) Mads Østberg	11:56.1	(France) Sébastien Ogier
Leg 3 (14 Abr)	SS15	Almodôvar 2 (Power Stage)	52.30 km	(France) Sébastien Ogier	32:39.7	(France) Sébastien Ogier

=== Power Stage ===
The "Power stage" was a 5,230 km (3,250 mi) stage at the end of the rally.

Pos	Driver	Time	Diff.	Points
1	(France) Sébastien Ogier	32:39.7	0.000	3
2	(Norway) Mads Østberg	32:43.0	+3.3	2
3	(Finland) Jari-Matti Latvala	32:44.5	+4.9	1

=== Notable retirements ===
Stage	No.	Driver	Co-driver	Team	Car	Class	Cause
SS3	4	(Norway) Mads Østberg	(Sweden) Jonas Andersson	(United Kingdom) Qatar M-Sport WRT	Ford Fiesta RS WRC	WRC	Crash

== Championship standings after the event ==
=== FIA World Rally Championship for Drivers ===
Points are awarded to the top 10 classified finishers.

Position	1st	2nd	3rd	4th	5th	6th	7th	8th	9th	10th
Points	25	18	15	12	10	8	6	4	2	1

Pos.	Driver	MON (Monaco)	SWE (Sweden)	MEX (Mexico)	POR (Portugal)	ARG (Argentina)	GRE (Greece)	ITA (Italy)	FIN (Finland)	GER (Germany)	AUS (Australia)	FRA (France)	ESP (Spain)	GBR (United Kingdom)	Points
1	(France) Sébastien Ogier	2	1^{1}	1^{1}	1^{1}										102
2	(Finland) Mikko Hirvonen	4	17	2	2										48
3	(France) Sébastien Loeb	1	2												43
4	(Norway) Mads Østberg	6	3^{3}	11^{2}	8^{2}										32
5	(Finland) Jari-Matti Latvala	Ret	4^{2}	16^{3}	3^{3}										31
6	(Spain) Dani Sordo	3	Ret	4	12										27
7	(Belgium) Thierry Neuville	Ret	5	3	18										25
8	(Qatar) Nasser Al-Attiyah			5	5										20
9	(Czech Republic) Martin Prokop	7	7	9	7										20
10	(Russia) Evgeny Novikov	Ret	9	10	4										15
11	(France) Bryan Bouffier	5			13										10
12	(Finland) Juho Hänninen	Ret	6												8
13	(Australia) Chris Atkinson			6											8
14	(Norway) Andreas Mikkelsen				6										8
15	(United States) Ken Block			7											6
16	(Germany) Sepp Wiegand	8	13		14										4
17	(Norway) Henning Solberg		8												4
18	(Mexico) Benito Guerra		WD	8											4
19	(Switzerland) Olivier Burri	9													2
20	(United Arab Emirates) Khalid Al Qassimi		Ret		9										2
21	(Poland) Michał Kościuszko	10	14	Ret	Ret										1
22	(Saudi Arabia) Yazeed Al-Rajhi		10		WD										1
23	(Finland) Esapekka Lappi	Ret			10										1
Pos.	Driver	MON (Monaco)	SWE (Sweden)	MEX (Mexico)	POR (Portugal)	ARG (Argentina)	GRE (Greece)	ITA (Italy)	FIN (Finland)	GER (Germany)	AUS (Australia)	FRA (France)	ESP (Spain)	GBR (United Kingdom)	Points

Key
Colour	Result
Gold	Winner
Silver	2nd place
Bronze	3rd place
Green	Points finish
Blue	Non-points finish
Blue	Non-classified finish (NC)
Purple	Did not finish (Ret)
Black	Excluded (EX)
Black	Disqualified (DSQ)
White	Did not start (DNS)
White	Cancelled (C)
Blank	Withdrew entry from the event (WD)

Notes:
^{1 2 3} – Indicate position on Power Stage

=== FIA World Rally Championship for Manufacturers ===
Pos.	Manufacturer	No.	MON (Monaco)	SWE (Sweden)	MEX (Mexico)	POR (Portugal)	ARG (Argentina)	GRE (Greece)	ITA (Italy)	FIN (Finland)	GER (Germany)	AUS (Australia)	FRA (France)	ESP (Spain)	GBR (United Kingdom)	Points
1	(Germany) Volkswagen Motorsport	7	Ret	4	10	3										121
1	(Germany) Volkswagen Motorsport	8	2	1	1	1										121
2	(France) Citroën Total Abu Dhabi World Rally Team	1	1	2												107
2	(France) Citroën Total Abu Dhabi World Rally Team	2	4	9	2	2										107
2	(France) Citroën Total Abu Dhabi World Rally Team	3			4	9										107
3	(United Kingdom) Qatar M-Sport World Rally Team (Note: Following Ford's withdrawal from the category as a manufacturer team, the FIA recognised Qatar M-Sport as the de facto manufacturer team, subjecting them to the same rules as other manufacturer teams.)	4	5	3	9	7										55
3	(United Kingdom) Qatar M-Sport World Rally Team	5	Ret	7	8	4										55
4	(United Kingdom) Qatar World Rally Team	6	Ret		5											36
4	(United Kingdom) Qatar World Rally Team	11	Ret	5	3	10										36
5	(France) Abu Dhabi Citroën Total World Rally Team	10	3	Ret	6	8										27
6	(Czech Republic) Jipocar Czech National Team	21		6	7	6										22
7	(Italy) Lotos Team WRC (Note: Although Lotos Team WRC is recognised by the FIA as a manufacturer team, only their best eight results from thirteen rallies will be counted towards the team's final points tally.)	12	6	8	Ret	Ret										12
8	(Germany) Volkswagen Motorsport II	9				5										10
Pos.	Manufacturer	No.	MON (Monaco)	SWE (Sweden)	MEX (Mexico)	POR (Portugal)	ARG (Argentina)	GRE (Greece)	ITA (Italy)	FIN (Finland)	GER (Germany)	AUS (Australia)	FRA (France)	ESP (Spain)	GBR (United Kingdom)	Points

Key
Colour	Result
Gold	Winner
Silver	2nd place
Bronze	3rd place
Green	Points finish
Blue	Non-points finish
Blue	Non-classified finish (NC)
Purple	Did not finish (Ret)
Black	Excluded (EX)
Black	Disqualified (DSQ)
White	Did not start (DNS)
White	Cancelled (C)
Blank	Withdrew entry from the event (WD)

=== WRC2 Drivers' championship ===
Position	1st	2nd	3rd	4th	5th	6th	7th	8th	9th	10th
Points	25	18	15	12	10	8	6	4	2	1

Pos.	Driver	MON (Monaco)	SWE (Sweden)	MEX (Mexico)	POR (Portugal)	ARG (Argentina)	GRE (Greece)	ITA (Italy)	FIN (Finland)	GER (Germany)	AUS (Australia)	FRA (France)	ESP (Spain)	GBR (United Kingdom)	Points
1	(Germany) Sepp Wiegand	1	3		3										55
2	(Peru) Nicolás Fuchs		5	2	4										40
3	(Ukraine) Yuriy Protasov	3	4	5											37
4	(Qatar) Abdulaziz Al-Kuwari			1	5										35
5	(Mexico) Ricardo Triviño	5	7	3											31
6	(Germany) Armin Kremer	2		4											30
7	(Saudi Arabia) Yazeed Al-Rajhi		1												25
8	(Finland) Esapekka Lappi	Ret			1										25
9	(Norway) Anders Grøndal		2												18
10	(Republic of Ireland) Robert Barrable				2										18
12	(United Arab Emirates) Rashid al Ketbi	4	8		Ret										16
13	(Kazakhstan) Arman Smailov		6		10										9
14	(Poland) Robert Kubica				6										8
15	(Italy) Edoardo Bresolin				7										6
16	(United Kingdom) Elfyn Evans				8										4
17	(Spain) Alexander Villanueva		9		Ret										2
18	(Argentina) Juan Carlos Alonso				9										2
19	(Czech Republic) Martin Hudec		10												1
Pos.	Driver	MON (Monaco)	SWE (Sweden)	MEX (Mexico)	POR (Portugal)	ARG (Argentina)	GRE (Greece)	ITA (Italy)	FIN (Finland)	GER (Germany)	AUS (Australia)	FRA (France)	ESP (Spain)	GBR (United Kingdom)	Points

Key
Colour	Result
Gold	Winner
Silver	2nd place
Bronze	3rd place
Green	Points finish
Blue	Non-points finish
Blue	Non-classified finish (NC)
Purple	Did not finish (Ret)
Black	Excluded (EX)
Black	Disqualified (DSQ)
White	Did not start (DNS)
White	Cancelled (C)
Blank	Withdrew entry from the event (WD)

=== WRC3 Drivers' Championship ===
Position	1st	2nd	3rd	4th	5th	6th	7th	8th	9th	10th
Points	25	18	15	12	10	8	6	4	2	1

Pos.	Driver	MON (Monaco)	SWE (Sweden)	MEX (Mexico)	POR (Portugal)	ARG (Argentina)	GRE (Greece)	ITA (Italy)	FIN (Finland)	GER (Germany)	AUS (Australia)	FRA (France)	ESP (Spain)	GBR (United Kingdom)	Points
1	(France) Sébastien Chardonnet	1			2										43
2	(France) Bryan Bouffier				1										25
3	(France) Quentin Gilbert	WD			3										15
4	(United Kingdom) Alastair Fisher				4										12
5	(Republic of Ireland) Keith Cronin				5										10
6	(Italy) Simone Campedelli				6										8
—	(France) Renaud Poutot	Ret													0
Pos.	Driver	MON (Monaco)	SWE (Sweden)	MEX (Mexico)	POR (Portugal)	ARG (Argentina)	GRE (Greece)	ITA (Italy)	FIN (Finland)	GER (Germany)	AUS (Australia)	FRA (France)	ESP (Spain)	GBR (United Kingdom)	Points

Key
Colour	Result
Gold	Winner
Silver	2nd place
Bronze	3rd place
Green	Points finish
Blue	Non-points finish
Blue	Non-classified finish (NC)
Purple	Did not finish (Ret)
Black	Excluded (EX)
Black	Disqualified (DSQ)
White	Did not start (DNS)
White	Cancelled (C)
Blank	Withdrew entry from the event (WD)

=== Junior WRC Drivers' Championship ===
Points are awarded to the top 10 classified finishers, and one point for winning a stage. Five best results of the season are counted towards the final score.

Position	1st	2nd	3rd	4th	5th	6th	7th	8th	9th	10th	Stage win
Points	25	18	15	12	10	8	6	4	2	1	1

=== Drivers' championship ===
Pos.	Driver	POR (Portugal)	GRE (Greece)	FIN (Finland)	GER (Germany)	FRA (France)	ESP (Spain)	Points
1	(Sweden) Pontus Tidemand	1 ^{5}						30
2	(Spain) José Antonio Suárez	2 ^{2}						20
3	(Spain) Yeray Lemes	3 ^{2}						17
4	(Finland) Andreas Amberg	4						12
5	(Slovakia) Martin Koči	5						10
6	(Norway) Marius Aasen	6 ^{1}						9
7	(Finland) Niko-Pekka Nieminen	7						6
8	(Estonia) Sander Pärn	8						4
NC	(Turkey) Murat Bostancı	Ret						0
NC	(Switzerland) Michaël Burri	Ret						0
Pos.	Driver	POR (Portugal)	GRE (Greece)	FIN (Finland)	GER (Germany)	FRA (France)	ESP (Spain)	Points

Notes

- ^{1} refers to the number of stages won, where a bonus point is awarded per stage win.

=== Co-drivers' championship ===
Pos.	Co-driver	POR (Portugal)	GRE (Greece)	FIN (Finland)	GER (Germany)	FRA (France)	ESP (Spain)	Points
1	(Norway) Ola Fløene	1 ^{5}						30
2	(Spain) Cándido Carrera	2 ^{2}						20
3	(Spain) Rogelio Peñate	3 ^{2}						17
4	(Finland) Mikko Lukka	4						12
5	(Czech Republic) Petr Starý	5						10
6	(Norway) Marlene Engan	6 ^{1}						9
7	(Finland) Mikael Korhonen	7						6
8	(Estonia) Ken Järveoja	8						4
NC	(France) Gabin Moreau	Ret						0
NC	(Turkey) Onur Vatansever	Ret						0
Pos.	Co-driver	POR (Portugal)	GRE (Greece)	FIN (Finland)	GER (Germany)	FRA (France)	ESP (Spain)	Points

Notes

- ^{1} refers to the number of stages won, where a bonus point is awarded per stage win.
