= Cándido Carrera =

Spanish rally co-driver

Personal information
- Nationality: Spanish
- Full name: Cándido Carrera Estévez

World Rally Championship record
- Years active: 2010–2016, 2018–2019, 2021–present
- Driver: Dani Sordo
- Teams: Hyundai Motorsport
- Rallies: 41
- Championships: 0
- Rally wins: 0
- Podiums: 5
- Stage wins: 12
- First rally: 2010 Rally Catalunya

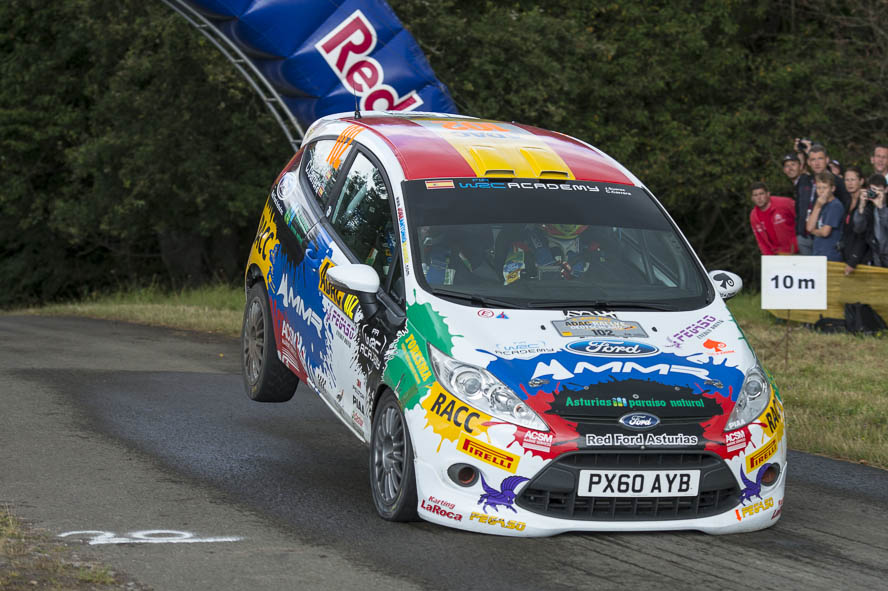
2012 rallye deutschland

Cándido Carrera Estévez is a Spanish rallying co-driver. He is set to partner with Dani Sordo for Hyundai Motorsport in the World Rally Championship category.

== Rally career ==
Carrera made his WRC debut at the 2010 Rally Catalunya. In July 2021, three-time rally winner Dani Sordo announced Carrera as his new co-driver, replacing compatriot Borja Rozada.

== Rally results ==
=== WRC results ===
| Year | Entrant | Car | 1 | 2 | 3 | 4 | 5 | 6 | 7 | 8 | 9 | 10 | 11 | 12 | 13 | 14 | WDC | Points |
|---|---|---|---|---|---|---|---|---|---|---|---|---|---|---|---|---|---|---|
| 2010 | José Antonio Suárez | Ford Fiesta R2 | SWE | MEX | JOR | TUR | NZL | POR | BUL | FIN | GER | JPN | FRA | ESP; Ret | GBR | | NC | 0 |
| 2011 | José Antonio Suárez | Ford Fiesta R2 | SWE | MEX | POR; Ret | JOR | ITA; Ret | ARG | GRE | FIN; NC | GER; NC | AUS | FRA; NC | | GBR; NC | | NC | 0 |
| 2011 | Nicolás Fuchs | Mitsubishi Lancer Evo X | | | | | | | | | | | | ESP; 31 | | | NC | 0 |
| 2012 | José Antonio Suárez | Ford Fiesta R2 | MON | SWE | MEX | POR | ARG | GRE; NC | NZL | FIN; NC | GER; NC | GBR | FRA; Ret | ITA | ESP; Ret | | NC | 0 |
| 2013 | ACSM Rallye Team | Ford Fiesta R2 | MON | SWE | MEX | POR; NC | ARG | GRE; EX | ITA | FIN; NC | GER; NC | AUS | FRA; Ret | ESP; Ret | GBR | | NC | 0 |
| 2014 | Pepe López | Ford Fiesta R2 | MON | SWE | MEX | POR | ARG | ITA | POL; Ret | FIN; 53 | GER | AUS | FRA | ESP; 29 | GBR | | NC | 0 |
| 2015 | José Antonio Suárez | Peugeot 208 T16 | MON | SWE | MEX | ARG | POR | ITA | POL | FIN | GER | AUS | FRA | ESP; 56 | GBR | | NC | 0 |
| 2016 | Peugeot Rally Academy | Peugeot 208 T16 | MON; 17 | SWE | MEX | ARG | POR; 21 | ITA; Ret | POL | FIN | GER; 14 | CHN; C | FRA; Ret | ESP; 37 | GBR; 27 | AUS | NC | 0 |
| 2018 | José Antonio Suárez | Hyundai i20 R5 | MON | SWE | MEX | FRA | ARG | POR | ITA | FIN | GER; Ret | TUR | GBR | ESP; Ret | AUS | | NC | 0 |
| 2019 | Club Race | Peugeot 208 R2 | MON | SWE | MEX | FRA | ARG | CHL | POR | ITA | FIN | GER | TUR | GBR | ESP; 30 | AUS; C | NC | 0 |
| 2021 | Hyundai Shell Mobis WRT | Hyundai i20 Coupe WRC | MON | ARC | CRO | POR | ITA | KEN | EST | BEL | GRE; 4 | FIN | ESP; 3 | MNZ; 3 | | | 9th | 50 |
| 2022 | Hyundai Shell Mobis WRT | Hyundai i20 N Rally1 | MON | SWE | CRO | POR; 3 | ITA; 3 | KEN | EST | FIN | BEL | GRE; 3 | NZL | ESP; 5 | JPN; Ret | | 8th | 59 |
| 2023 | Hyundai Shell Mobis WRT | Hyundai i20 N Rally1 | MON; 7 | SWE | MEX; 5 | CRO | POR; 2 | ITA; Ret | KEN; 5 | EST | FIN | GRE; 3 | CHL | EUR | JPN; Ret | | 8th | 63 |
| 2024 | Hyundai Shell Mobis WRT | Hyundai i20 N Rally1 | MON | SWE | KEN | CRO | POR; 5 | ITA; 3 | POL | LAT | FIN | GRE; 2 | CHL | EUR | JPN | | 9th | 44 |
| 2025 | Team Hyundai Portugal | Hyundai i20 N Rally2 | MON | SWE | KEN | ESP | POR; Ret | ITA | GRE | EST | FIN | PAR | CHL | EUR | JPN | | NC | 0 |
| 2025 | M-Sport Ford WRT | Ford Puma Rally1 | | | | | | | | | | | | | | SAU; 15 | NC | 0 |
| 2026 | Hyundai Shell Mobis WRT | Hyundai i20 N Rally1 | MON | SWE | KEN | CRO | ESP; 7 | POR; 8 | JPN | GRE; Ret | EST | FIN | PAR | CHL | ITA | SAU; C | 17th | 10 |

* Season still in progress.
