= 2013 Rally Finland =

Motor rally competition

2013 Rally Finland 63rd Neste Oil Rally Finland
Round 8 of the 2013 World Rally Championship
| ← Previous event | Next event → |
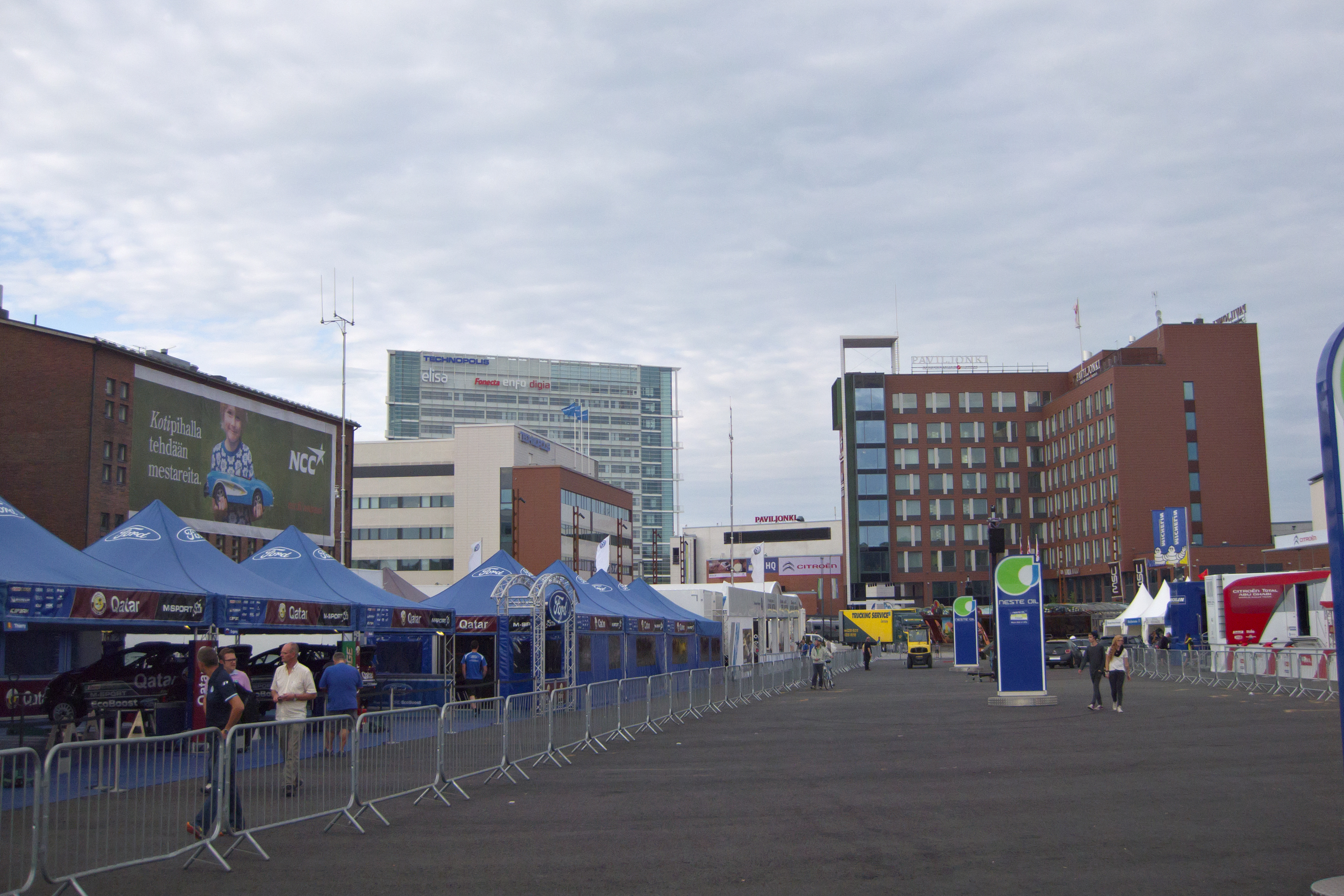
- Preparations for the rally at the service park on 30 July 2013.
- Host country: Finland
- Rally base: Jyväskylä, Keski-Suomi
- Dates run: 31 July – 3 August 2013
- Stages: 23 (324.21 km; 201.45 miles)
- Stage surface: Gravel
- Overall distance: 1,580.02 km (981.78 miles)

Overall results
- Overall winner: (France) Sébastien Ogier (France) Julien Ingrassia (Germany) Volkswagen Motorsport

The 63rd Neste Oil Rally Finland was the eighth round of the 2013 World Rally Championship season and was held between 31 July and 3 August 2013. The rally is based in Jyväskylä.

The rally was also the eighth round of both WRC-2 and WRC-3 championships, and the third round of the JWRC championship.

== Itinerary ==
The route of the rally features 23 stages with 324.21 kilometres of competitive distance.

Itinerary of the Rally
| Time (UTC+3) | Stage number | Stage name | Length |
Qualifying — Wednesday 31 July
| 16:00 | P1 & P2 | Ruuhimäki (Free Practice, 90 mins) | 4.62 km |
| 19:00 | P1 & P2 | Ruuhimäki (Qualifying) | 4.62 km |
| 19:45 | P3 | Ruuhimäki (Shakedown, 135 mins) | 4.62 km |
Leg 1 — Thursday 1 August
| 11:15 | | Start — Paviljonki, Jyväskylä | —N/a |
| 12:15 | SS1 | Himos 1 | 4.45 km |
| 13:40 | SS2 | Torittu 1 | 8.30 km |
| 15:18 | SS3 | Koukunmaa | 13.68 km |
| 17:34 | SS4 | Torittu 2 | 8.30 km |
| 19:00 | SS5 | Himos 2 | 8.72 km |
| 20:30 | SS6 | SSS Killeri 1 | 2.06 km |
| 21:10 | | Service A — Paviljonki, Jyväskylä | 45 mins |
Leg 2 — Friday 2 August
| 8:30 | | Service B — Paviljonki, Jyväskylä | 15 mins |
| 9:48 | SS7 | Jukojärvi 1 | 21.90 km |
| 10:56 | SS8 | Palsankylä 1 | 13.92 km |
| 11:41 | SS9 | Mökkiperä 1 | 13.74 km |
| 12:44 | SS10 | Lankamaa 1 | 23.66 km |
| 14:03 | | Service C — Paviljonki, Jyväskylä | 30 mins |
| 15:36 | SS11 | Jukojärvi 2 | 21.90 km |
| 16:44 | SS12 | Palsankylä 2 | 13.92 km |
| 17:29 | SS13 | Mökkiperä 2 | 13.74 km |
| 18:32 | SS14 | Lankamaa 2 | 23.66 km |
| 20:30 | SS15 | SSS Killeri 2 | 2.06 km |
| 21:10 | | Service D — Paviljonki, Jyväskylä | 45 mins |
Leg 3 — Saturday 3 August
| 7:30 | | Service E — Paviljonki, Jyväskylä | 15 mins |
| 8:26 | SS16 | Surkee 1 | 14.95 km |
| 9:24 | SS17 | Leustu 1 | 9.65 km |
| 10:32 | SS18 | Ouninpohja 1 | 33.01 km |
| 11:50 | SS19 | Painaa 1 | 7.49 km |
| 12:53 | | Service F — Paviljonki, Jyväskylä | 30 mins |
| 14:04 | SS20 | Surkee 2 | 14.95 km |
| 15:02 | SS21 | Leustu 2 | 9.65 km |
| 16:10 | SS22 | Ouninpohja 2 | 33.01 km |
| 17:40 | SS23 | Painaa 2 (Power stage) | 7.49 km |
| 18:33 | | Service G — Paviljonki, Jyväskylä | 10 mins |
| 18:43 | | Finish — Paviljonki, Jyväskylä | —N/a |

== Entry list ==
The entry list of the rally had overall 101 entries which was the biggest number in World Rally Championship since 2011 Rally Finland. 14 of the entries were World Rally Cars, 21 of them were competing in WRC-2, 11 in WRC-3 and 10 in Junior WRC.

On the Thursday morning a total of 96 cars started the rally. Entries withdrawn are marked with a grey background.

| Car no. | Driver | Co-driver | Car | Class | Entrant | Priority | Eligibility |
|---|---|---|---|---|---|---|---|
| 2 | (Finland) Mikko Hirvonen | (Finland) Jarmo Lehtinen | Citroën DS3 WRC | WRC | (France) Citroën Total Abu Dhabi World Rally Team | 1 | Manuf. |
| 3 | (Spain) Dani Sordo | (Spain) Carlos del Barrio | Citroën DS3 WRC | WRC | (France) Citroën Total Abu Dhabi World Rally Team | 1 | Manuf. |
| 4 | (Norway) Mads Østberg | (Sweden) Jonas Andersson | Ford Fiesta RS WRC | WRC | (United Kingdom) Qatar M-Sport World Rally Team | 1 | Manuf. |
| 5 | (Russia) Evgeny Novikov | (Austria) Ilka Minor | Ford Fiesta RS WRC | WRC | (United Kingdom) Qatar M-Sport World Rally Team | 1 | Manuf. |
| 7 | (Finland) Jari-Matti Latvala | (Finland) Miikka Anttila | Volkswagen Polo R WRC | WRC | (Germany) Volkswagen Motorsport | 1 | Manuf. |
| 8 | (France) Sébastien Ogier | (France) Julien Ingrassia | Volkswagen Polo R WRC | WRC | (Germany) Volkswagen Motorsport | 1 | Manuf. |
| 9 | (Norway) Andreas Mikkelsen | (Finland) Mikko Markkula | Volkswagen Polo R WRC | WRC | (Germany) Volkswagen Motorsport II | 1 | |
| 10 | (United Kingdom) Kris Meeke | (United Kingdom) Chris Patterson | Citroën DS3 WRC | WRC | (United Arab Emirates) Abu Dhabi Citroën Total World Rally Team | 1 | Manuf. |
| 11 | (Belgium) Thierry Neuville | (Belgium) Nicolas Gilsoul | Ford Fiesta RS WRC | WRC | Qatar World Rally Team | 1 | Manuf. |
| 21 | (Czech Republic) Martin Prokop | (Czech Republic) Michal Ernst | Ford Fiesta RS WRC | WRC | (Czech Republic) Jipocar Czech National Team | 1 | Manuf. |
| 22 | (Finland) Jarkko Nikara | (Finland) Jarkko Kalliolepo | Mini John Cooper Works WRC | WRC | Driver | 1 | |
| 23 | (Sweden) Per-Gunnar Andersson | (Sweden) Emil Axelsson | Ford Fiesta RS WRC | WRC | Driver | 1 | |
| 24 | (Finland) Juho Hänninen | (Finland) Tomi Tuominen | Ford Fiesta RS WRC | WRC | Driver | 1 | |
| 25 | (Finland) Riku Tahko | (Finland) Markus Soininen | Mini John Cooper Works WRC | WRC | Driver | 2 | |
| 35 | (Saudi Arabia) Yazeed Al-Rajhi | (United Kingdom) Michael Orr | Ford Fiesta RRC | 2 | (Saudi Arabia) Yazeed Racing | 3 | WRC-2 |
| 36 | (United Arab Emirates) Rashid Al-Ketbi | (Germany) Karina Hepperle | Subaru Impreza WRX STi | 3 | (United Arab Emirates) Skydive Dubai Rally Team | | |
| 37 | (Italy) Lorenzo Bertelli | (Italy) Mitia Dotta | Ford Fiesta RRC | 2 | Driver | | |
| 40 | (Kazakhstan) Arman Smailov | (Russia) Andrey Rusov | Subaru Impreza WRX STi | 3 | Driver | 3 | WRC-2 |
| 43 | (Czech Republic) Martin Hudec | (Czech Republic) Jakub Kotál | Mitsubishi Lancer Evolution IX | 3 | (Czech Republic) Semerád Rally Team | 3 | WRC-2 |
| 45 | (Spain) Alexander Villanueva | (Spain) Óscar Sánchez | Mitsubishi Lancer Evolution X | 3 | Driver | 3 | WRC-2 |
| 47 | (Norway) Eyvind Brynildsen | (Sweden) Maria Andersson | Ford Fiesta R5 | 2 | (United Kingdom) DMack-Autotek | 3 | WRC-2 |
| 49 | (Ukraine) Oleksiy Kikireshko | (Ukraine) Andriy Nikolaiev | Mini John Cooper Works RRC | 2 | (Ukraine) Mentos Ascania Racing | 3 | WRC-2 |
| 50 | (Ukraine) Valeriy Gorban | (Ukraine) Volodymyr Korsya | Mini John Cooper Works RRC | 2 | (Ukraine) Mentos Ascania Racing | 3 | WRC-2 |
| 51 | (France) Sébastien Chardonnet | (France) Thibault de la Haye | Citroën DS3 R3T | 5 | Driver | 3 | WRC-3 |
| 52 | (France) Quentin Gilbert | (France) Isabelle Galmiche | Citroën DS3 R3T | 5 | Driver | 3 | WRC-3 |
| 53 | (United Kingdom) Alastair Fisher | (United Kingdom) Gordon Noble | Citroën DS3 R3T | 5 | (France) Saintéloc Racing | 3 | WRC-3 |
| 56 | (Switzerland) Francesco Parli | (Italy) Tania Canton | Citroën DS3 R3T | 5 | Driver | 3 | WRC-3 |
| 57 | (Switzerland) Federico della Casa | (Switzerland) Marco Menchini | Citroën DS3 R3T | 5 | Driver | 3 | WRC-3 |
| 58 | (Germany) Christian Riedemann | (Belgium) Lara Vanneste | Citroën DS3 R3T | 5 | (Germany) ADAC Team Weser-Ems | 3 | WRC-3 |
| 59 | (France) Bryan Bouffier | (France) Xavier Panseri | Citroën DS3 R3T | 5 | Driver | 3 | WRC-3 |
| 60 | (Republic of Ireland) Keith Cronin | (United Kingdom) Marshall Clarke | Citroën DS3 R3T | 5 | (United Kingdom) Charles Hurst Citroën Belfast | 3 | WRC-3 |
| 61 | (Italy) Simone Campedelli | (Italy) Danilo Fappani | Citroën DS3 R3T | 5 | (France) Saintéloc Racing | 3 | WRC-3 |
| 62 | (France) Stéphane Consani | (France) Maxime Vilmot | Citroën DS3 R3T | 5 | Driver | 3 | WRC-3 |
| 63 | (Finland) Jussi Vainionpää | (Finland) Mika Juntunen | Citroën DS3 R3T | 5 | Driver | 3 | WRC-3 |
| 72 | (Argentina) Juan Carlos Alonso | (Argentina) Juan Pablo Monasterolo | Mitsubishi Lancer Evolution X | 3 | Driver | 3 | WRC-2 |
| 74 | (Poland) Robert Kubica | (Poland) Maciej Baran | Citroën DS3 RRC | 2 | Driver | 3 | WRC-2 |
| 75 | (United Kingdom) Elfyn Evans | (United Kingdom) Daniel Barritt | Ford Fiesta R5 | 2 | (United Kingdom) Qatar M-Sport World Rally Team | 3 | WRC-2 |
| 78 | (Italy) Edoardo Bresolin | (Italy) Rudy Pollet | Ford Fiesta RRC | 2 | (Italy) E2 Tre Colli World Rally Team | 3 | WRC-2 |
| 79 | (Republic of Ireland) Robert Barrable | (United Kingdom) Stuart Loudon | Ford Fiesta R5 | 2 | Driver | 3 | WRC-2 |
| 82 | (Estonia) Karl Kruuda | (Estonia) Martin Järveoja | Ford Fiesta R5 | 2 | (Estonia) MM Motorsport | 3 | WRC-2 |
| 83 | (Ukraine) Oleksiy Tamrazov | (Ukraine) Pavlo Cherepin | Ford Fiesta S2000 | 2 | Driver | 3 | WRC-2 |
| 84 | (New Zealand) Hayden Paddon | (New Zealand) John Kennard | Škoda Fabia S2000 | 2 | Driver | 3 | WRC-2 |
| 85 | (Finland) Juha Salo | (Finland) Marko Salminen | Subaru Impreza WRX STi R4 | 2 | (Finland) Hannu's Rally Team | 3 | WRC-2 |
| 86 | (Venezuela) Carlos García | (Mexico) Víctor Pérez | Mitsubishi Lancer Evolution X | 3 | Driver | 3 | WRC-2 |
| 87 | (Venezuela) Jose Alexander Gelvez | (Mexico) Gabriel Marín Jr | Mitsubishi Lancer Evolution X | 3 | Driver | 3 | WRC-2 |
| 88 | (Finland) Jari Ketomaa | (Finland) Marko Sallinen | Ford Fiesta R5 | 2 | (United Kingdom) DMack-Autotek | 3 | WRC-2 |
| 89 | (Finland) Mikko Lehessaari | (Finland) Lassi Hartikainen | Subaru Impreza WRX STi R4 | 2 | (Finland) Hannu's Rally Team | 3 | WRC-2 |
| 90 | (Finland) Esapekka Lappi | (Finland) Janne Ferm | Škoda Fabia S2000 | 2 | Driver | 3 | WRC-2 |
| 92 | (Finland) Mikko Pajunen | (Finland) Janne Perälä | Ford Fiesta S2000 | 2 | Driver | | |
| 93 | (Russia) Alexey Lukyanuk | (Russia) Alexey Arnautov | Mitsubishi Lancer Evolution X | 3 | Driver | | |
| 94 | (Finland) Kari Hämäläinen | (Finland) Risto Pietiläinen | Ford Fiesta S2000 | 2 | Driver | | |
| 95 | (Latvia) Vasily Gryazin | (Russia) Dmitry Chumak | Ford Fiesta S2000 | 2 | (Latvia) Sports Racing Technologies | | |
| 96 | (Ukraine) Yuriy Protasov | (Estonia) Kuldar Sikk | Ford Fiesta RRC | 2 | Driver | | |
| 97 | (Russia) Radik Shaymiev | (Russia) Maxim Tsvetkov | Peugeot 207 S2000 | 2 | Driver | | |
| 98 | (Finland) Matias Kauppinen | (Finland) Jonne Halttunen | Subaru Impreza WRX STi | 3 | Driver | | |
| 99 | (Netherlands) Kees Burger | (Finland) Miika Teiskonen | Subaru Impreza WRX STi R4 | 2 | Driver | | |
| 100 | (Estonia) Sander Pärn | (Estonia) Ken Järveoja | Ford Fiesta R2 | 6 | Driver | | J-WRC |
| 102 | (Sweden) Pontus Tidemand | (Norway) Ola Fløene | Ford Fiesta R2 | 6 | Driver | | J-WRC |
| 103 | (Slovakia) Martin Koči | (Czech Republic) Petr Starý | Ford Fiesta R2 | 6 | (Slovakia) Styllex Motorsport | | J-WRC |
| 104 | (Finland) Andreas Amberg | (Finland) Mikko Lukka | Ford Fiesta R2 | 6 | Driver | | J-WRC |
| 105 | (Spain) José Antonio Suárez | (Spain) Cándido Carrera | Ford Fiesta R2 | 6 | (Spain) ACSM Rallye Team | | J-WRC |
| 106 | (Turkey) Murat Bostancı | (Turkey) Onur Vatansever | Ford Fiesta R2 | 6 | (Turkey) Castrol Ford Team Türkiye | | J-WRC |
| 107 | (Switzerland) Michaël Burri | (France) Gabin Moreau | Ford Fiesta R2 | 6 | Driver | | J-WRC |
| 108 | (Finland) Niko-Pekka Nieminen | (Finland) Ari Koponen | Ford Fiesta R2 | 6 | Driver | | J-WRC |
| 109 | (Norway) Marius Aasen | (Norway) Marlene Engan | Ford Fiesta R2 | 6 | Driver | | J-WRC |
| 110 | (Spain) Yeray Lemes | (Spain) Rogelio Peñate | Ford Fiesta R2 | 6 | Driver | | J-WRC |
| 111 | (Ukraine) Yuriy Kochmar | (Ukraine) Sergiy Koval | Mitsubishi Lancer Evolution X | 3 | Driver | | |
| 112 | (Finland) Jouni Virtanen | (Finland) Reeta Hämäläinen | Mitsubishi Lancer Evolution X R4 | 2 | Driver | | |
| 113 | (Estonia) Mait Maarend | (Estonia) Mihkel Kapp | Mitsubishi Lancer Evolution X | 3 | Driver | | |
| 114 | (Russia) Igor Bulantsev | (Russia) Alexey Kurnosov | Mitsubishi Lancer Evolution X | 3 | Driver | | |
| 115 | (Finland) Mika Myllylä | (Finland) Juha Laaksonen | Mitsubishi Lancer Evolution IX | 3 | Driver | | |
| 116 | (Ukraine) Taras Kravchenko | (Ukraine) Yuriy Kuzminov | Mitsubishi Lancer Evolution IX | 3 | Driver | | |
| 117 | (Ukraine) Yukhym Vazheyevskyi | (Ukraine) Oleksandr Gorbik | Subaru Impreza WRX STi | 3 | Driver | | |
| 118 | (Finland) Ilkka Kariste | (Finland) Mikael Lindberg | Subaru Impreza WRX STi | 3 | Driver | | |
| 119 | (Finland) Timo Partanen | (Finland) Mika Tynkkynen | Subaru Impreza WRX STi | 3 | Driver | | |
| 120 | (Finland) Jaro Kinnunen | (Finland) Mikael Korhonen | Peugeot 208 R2 | 6 | Driver | | |
| 121 | (Finland) Samuli Vuorisalo | (Finland) Eetu-Pekka Hellsten | Ford Fiesta R2 | 6 | Driver | | |
| 122 | (Finland) Tomi Vilenius | (Finland) Jari Tarvainen | Renault Clio R3 | 5 | Driver | | |
| 123 | (Finland) Juho Annala | (Finland) Tuukka Shemeikka | Citroën C2 R2 | 6 | Driver | | |
| 124 | (Finland) Henri Haapamäki | (Finland) Juha Lummaa | Citroën C2 R2 | 6 | Driver | | |
| 125 | (Finland) Joose Kojo | (Finland) Sami Taskinen | Citroën C2 R2 | 6 | Driver | | |
| 126 | (Russia) Sergey Bakulin | (Russia) Borislav Demchinskiy | Honda Civic Type R R3 | 5 | Co-driver | | |
| 127 | (Russia) Dmitry Voronov | (Russia) Dan Shchemel | Honda Civic Type R R3 | 5 | Driver | | |
| 128 | (Finland) Miikka Vuokila | (Finland) Harri Kervinen | Honda Civic Type R | 8 | Driver | | |
| 129 | (Finland) Jaakko Lavio | (Finland) Veikko Kanninen | Honda Civic Type R | 8 | Driver | | |
| 130 | (Finland) Tomi Leivo | (Finland) Teemu Horkama | Ford Fiesta R2 | 6 | Co-driver | | |
| 131 | (Finland) Christoffer Dahlström | (Finland) Rami Suorsa | Ford Fiesta R2 | 6 | Driver | | |
| 132 | (Finland) Kalle Mäkinen | (Finland) Juha Ruti | Honda Civic Type R | 8 | Co-driver | | |
| 133 | (Finland) Eerik Pietarinen | (Finland) Hannu Pietarinen | Ford Fiesta R2 | 6 | Co-driver | | |
| 134 | (Finland) Juha-Pekka Perämäki | (Finland) Kimmo Nevanpää | Honda Civic Type R | 8 | Driver | | |
| 135 | (Finland) Jari Kuikka | (Finland) Janne Pitkänen | Honda Civic Type R | 8 | Driver | | |
| 136 | (Finland) Esa Kettula | (Finland) Jarno Manner | Honda Civic Type R | 8 | Co-driver | | |
| 137 | (Estonia) Kristen Kelement | (Estonia) Timo Kasesalu | Citroën C2 R2 | 6 | Driver | | |
| 138 | (Finland) Kari Hytönen | (Finland) Ada Herranen | Ford Fiesta R2 | 6 | Driver | | |
| 139 | (Estonia) Kenneth Sepp | (Estonia) Raul Markus | Citroën C2 R2 | 6 | Driver | | |
| 140 | (Italy) Simone Tempestini | (Romania) Dorin Pulpea | Škoda Fabia R2 | 6 | Driver | | |
| 141 | (Italy) Fabrizio Gini | (Italy) Gabriele Lunardi | Subaru Impreza WRX STi | 3 | Driver | | |
| 142 | (Italy) Fabrizio de Sanctis | (Italy) “Ingmar” | Mitsubishi Lancer Evolution IX | 3 | Driver | | |
| 143 | (France) David Julia | (France) Ludovic Aubertin | Peugeot 206 RC | 5 | Driver | | |
| 144 | (Finland) Sami Juusonen | (Finland) Jan Talso | Suzuki Swift Sport | 9 | Driver | | |
| 145 | (Finland) Raimo Kaisanlahti | (Finland) Jussi Kumpumäki | Ford Fiesta R1 | 9 | Driver | | |

| Icon | Class |
|---|---|
| Manuf. | WRC entries eligible to score manufacturer points |
| WRC-2 | Registered to take part in WRC-2 championship |
| WRC-3 | Registered to take part in WRC-3 championship |
| J-WRC | Registered to take part in Junior WRC championship |
