= Lorenzo Bertelli =

Italian rally driver and businessman

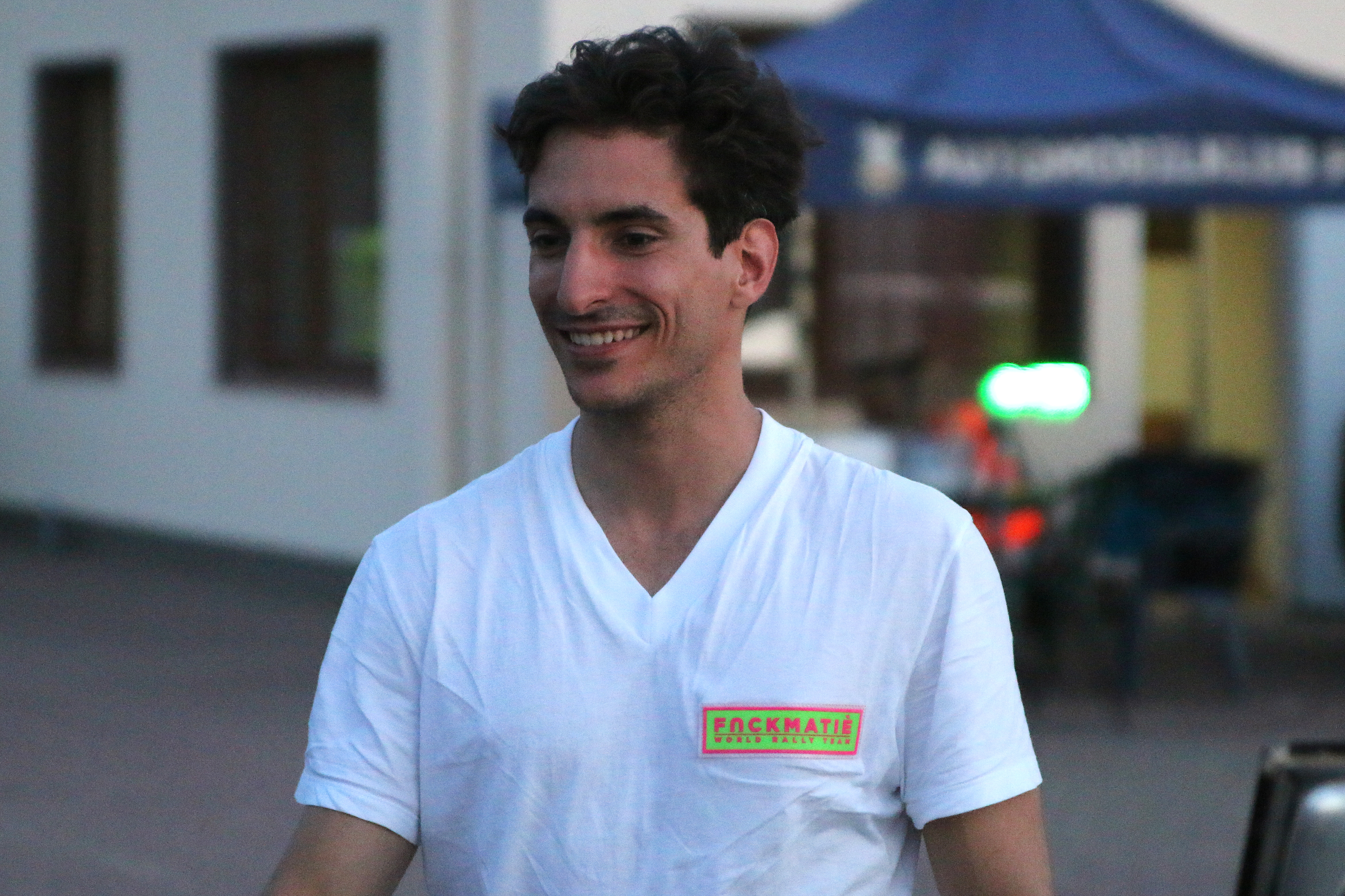
- Lorenzo Bertelli competing at the 2015 Rally Poland.

Personal information
- Nationality: (Italy) Italian
- Born: 10 May 1988 (age 38)

World Rally Championship record
- Years active: 2011–2017, 2019, 2021-present
- Teams: FWRT s.r.l.
- Rallies: 63
- Championships: 0
- Rally wins: 0
- Podiums: 0
- Stage wins: 0
- Total points: 15
- First rally: 2011 Rally d'Italia Sardegna
- Last rally: 2026 Rally Sweden

Lorenzo Bertelli (born 10 May 1988) is an Italian businessman in the fashion industry and a rally driver. He is the son of Prada majority owners, fashion designer Miuccia Prada and her husband, the businessman Patrizio Bertelli.

== Biography ==
=== Racing career ===
In rallying, Bertelli occasionally competes as a privateer in the World Rally Championship and made his series debut during the 2011 season at the Rally d'Italia Sardegna.

In May 2013, Bertelli took the wheel of the Ford Fiesta RRC, with which he secured his first victory in the WRC-2 at the 2014 Rally Sardegna and four further podiums on his way to third in the championship.

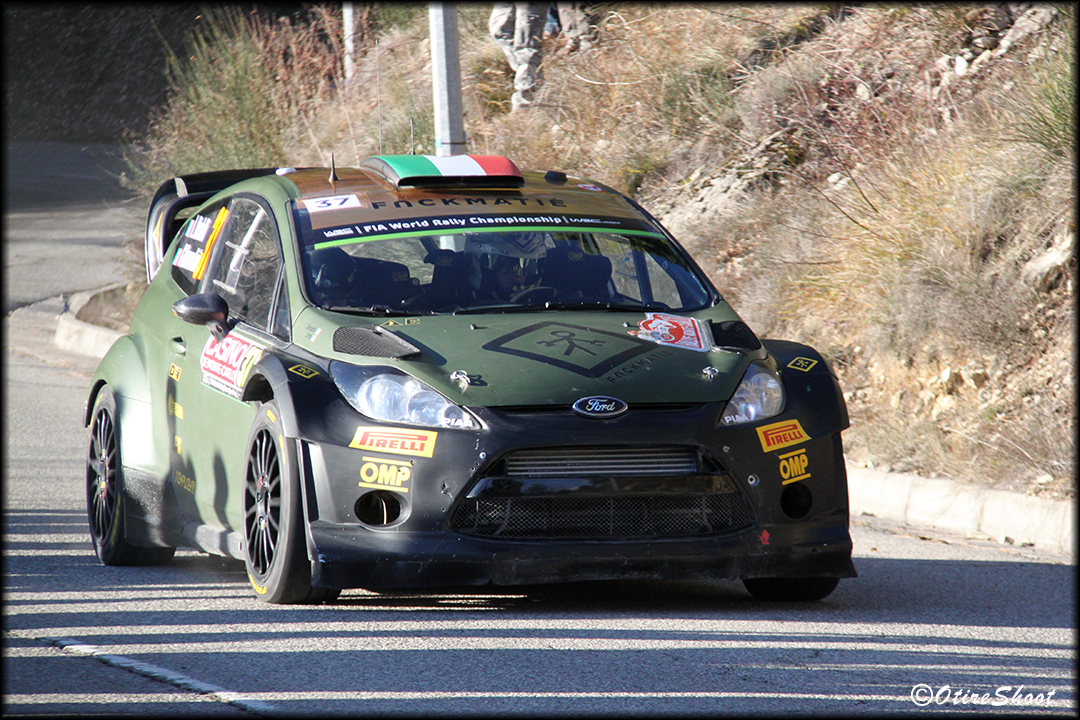
Bertelli competing in the 2015 Monte Carlo Rally.

In 2015, Bertelli made his debut in the WRC proper. He was involved in a crash in Portugal that resulted in him criticising the organisers over their safety protocols; claims that were rebuked by the WRC Commission.

During the 2016 season, Bertelli competed again in the WRC World Championship, finishing 22nd overall with five points earned, in Mexico and Australia. In 2017, he competed in the Rally Sweden with an old Fiesta RS WRC, retiring, and switched to the new Fiesta WRC in the Rally Mexico, finishing 16th. He also competed in the Rally Argentina, retiring due to gearbox problems. In 2018, he did not compete in the World Championship.

In 2019, Bertelli returned to the WRC in the Fiesta WRC of the M-Sport Ford WRT team, finishing the Rally Sweden in 20th position and the Rally Chile in 13th position. He then skipped 2020 to return in 2021, still with the M-Sport Fiesta. He competed in the Arctic Rally Finland finishing only 51st and the Safari Rally Kenya finishing 11th.

In 2022, Bertelli competed in the Rally New Zealand with the new Ford Puma Rally1 of M-Sport, finishing in seventh position, his best result ever, earning six points and finishing 25th in the championship.

=== Business career ===
Bertelli has been an executive director of Prada since May 2021, having previously held roles at the company as Head of Digital Communication, Group Marketing Director and Head of Corporate Social Responsibility.

== Career results ==
=== WRC results ===
Year	Entrant	Car	1	2	3	4	5	6	7	8	9	10	11	12	13	14	Pos.	Points
2011	Lorenzo Bertelli	Mitsubishi Lancer Evo IX	SWE	MEX	POR	JOR	ITA; 26	ARG	GRE	FIN	GER	AUS	FRA	ESP; 26	GBR; 20		NC	0
2012	Lorenzo Bertelli	Mitsubishi Lancer Evo IX	MON; Ret	SWE	MEX		ARG; 23										NC	0
2012	Lorenzo Bertelli	Subaru Impreza STi N15				POR; Ret		GRE; 24	NZL; Ret	FIN	GER			ITA; Ret	ESP; 29		NC	0
2012	Lorenzo Bertelli	Subaru Impreza STi										GBR; 22	FRA				NC	0
2013	Lorenzo Bertelli	Subaru Impreza STi N15	MON; Ret	SWE; 20	MEX; Ret	POR; Ret	ARG; Ret										NC	0
2013	Lorenzo Bertelli	Ford Fiesta RRC						GRE; Ret	ITA; 12	FIN; Ret	GER	AUS	FRA				NC	0
2013	Lorenzo Bertelli	Ford Fiesta R5												ESP; Ret	GBR; 38		NC	0
2014	FWRT s.r.l.	Ford Fiesta R5	MON; 12	SWE; 18		POR; 30				FIN; Ret	GER; 50			ESP; Ret	GBR; 12		23rd	2
2014	Lorenzo Bertelli	Ford Fiesta RRC			MEX; 13												23rd	2
2014	FWRT s.r.l.	Ford Fiesta RRC					ARG; 13	ITA; 9	POL			AUS; 14	FRA				23rd	2
2015	FWRT s.r.l.	Ford Fiesta RS WRC	MON; 68	SWE; Ret	MEX; Ret	ARG; 18	POR; Ret	ITA; Ret	POL; 16	FIN; 10	GER; DNS	AUS; 18	FRA; Ret	ESP; Ret	GBR; 10		29th	2
2016	FWRT s.r.l.	Ford Fiesta RS WRC	MON; Ret	SWE; Ret	MEX; 8	ARG; 13	POR; WD	ITA; Ret	POL; 12	FIN; Ret	GER; WD	CHN; C	FRA; 17	ESP; 11	GBR; 15	AUS; 10	22nd	5
2017	FWRT s.r.l.	Ford Fiesta RS WRC	MON	SWE; Ret													NC	0
2017	M-Sport	Ford Fiesta WRC			MEX; 16	FRA	ARG; Ret	POR	ITA	POL	FIN	GER	ESP	GBR	AUS		NC	0
2018	FWRT s.r.l.	Ford Fiesta WRC	MON	SWE; WD	MEX	FRA	ARG	POR	ITA	FIN	GER	TUR	GBR	ESP	AUS		NC	0
2019	M-Sport Ford WRT	Ford Fiesta WRC	MON	SWE; 20	MEX	FRA	ARG	CHL; 13	POR	ITA	FIN	GER	TUR	GBR	ESP	AUS; C	NC	0
2021	M-Sport Ford WRT	Ford Fiesta WRC	MON	ARC; 51	CRO	POR	ITA	KEN; 11	EST	BEL	GRE	FIN	ESP	MNZ			NC	0
2022	M-Sport Ford WRT	Ford Puma Rally1	MON	SWE; WD	CRO	POR	ITA	KEN	EST	FIN	BEL	GRE	NZL; 7	ESP	JPN		25th	6
2023	Toyota Gazoo Racing WRT	Toyota GR Yaris Rally1	MON	SWE; 14	MEX	CRO	POR	ITA	KEN	EST	FIN	GRE	CHL	EUR	JPN		NC	0
2024	Toyota Gazoo Racing WRT	Toyota GR Yaris Rally1	MON	SWE; 10	KEN	CRO	POR	ITA	POL	LAT	FIN	GRE	CHL	EUR	JPN		NC	0
2025	Toyota Gazoo Racing WRT	Toyota GR Yaris Rally1	MON	SWE; WD	KEN	ESP	POR	ITA	GRE	EST	FIN	PAR	CHL	EUR	JPN	SAU	NC*	0*

* Season still in progress.

=== PWRC results ===
Year	Entrant	Car	1	2	3	4	5	6	7	8	Pos.	Points
2012	Lorenzo Bertelli	Mitsubishi Lancer Evo IX	MON; Ret	MEX	ARG; 8						10th	24
2012	Lorenzo Bertelli	Subaru Impreza STi N15				GRE; 5	NZL; Ret	GER	ITA; Ret	ESP; 5	10th	24

=== WRC-2 results ===
Year	Entrant	Car	1	2	3	4	5	6	7	8	9	10	11	12	13	Pos.	Points
2013	Lorenzo Bertelli	Subaru Impreza STi N15	MON; Ret	SWE	MEX; Ret	POR	ARG; Ret									21st	15
2013	Lorenzo Bertelli	Ford Fiesta RRC						GRE; Ret	ITA; 3	FIN	GER	AUS	FRA			21st	15
2013	Lorenzo Bertelli	Ford Fiesta R5												ESP; Ret	GBR; 11	21st	15
2014	FWRT s.r.l.	Ford Fiesta R5	MON; 2	SWE; 6											GBR; 2	3rd	103
2014	Lorenzo Bertelli	Ford Fiesta RRC			MEX; 2	POR										3rd	103
2014	FWRT s.r.l.	Ford Fiesta RRC					ARG; 4	ITA; 1	POL	FIN	GER	AUS; 4	FRA	ESP		3rd	103

=== WRC-Trophy results ===
Year	Entrant	Car	1	2	3	4	5	6	7	8	9	10	11	12	13	Pos.	Points
2017	FWRT s.r.l.	Ford Fiesta RS WRC	MON	SWE; Ret	MEX	FRA	ARG	POR	ITA	POL	FIN	GER	ESP	GBR	AUS	NC	0
