= Sébastien Chardonnet =

French rally driver (born 1988)

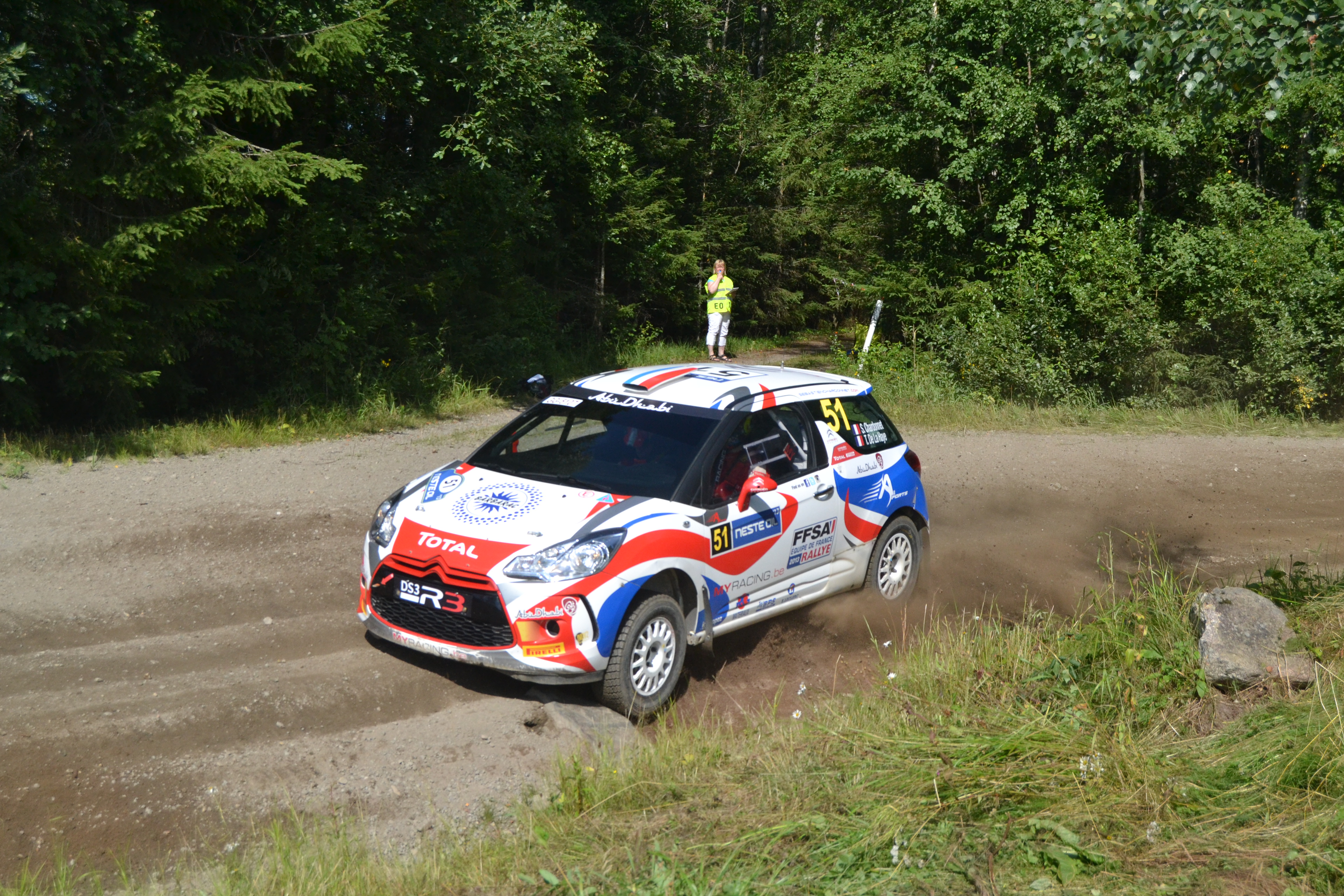
- Chardonnet at 2013 Rally Finland

Personal information
- Nationality: (France) French
- Full name: Sébastien Georges Frédéric Chardonnet
- Born: 17 October 1988 (age 38)

World Rally Championship record
- Years active: 2012–2015
- Teams: Collectif Equipe de France Rallye
- Rallies: 22
- Championships: 0
- Rally wins: 0
- Podiums: 0
- Stage wins: 0
- Total points: 1
- First rally: 2012 Monte Carlo Rally
- Last rally: 2015 Monte Carlo Rally

Sébastien Georges Frédéric Chardonnet (born 17 October 1988) is a French rally driver. He made his WRC debut in 2012 Monte Carlo Rally in Renault Clio R3 with his co-driver Thibault de la Haye. Chardonnet scored his first championship point in 2012 Rallye de France by finishing tenth overall driving Citroën DS3 WRC.

Chardonnet started his career in karting at the age of 11, promoting to single-seaters such as Formula Renault before switching to rallying, in 2009. His grandfather was André 'Doudou' Chardonnet, a former circuit racer and rally driver himself. André Chardonnet was also an established Lancia importer in France, who owned a very successful privateer rally team. Frenchman Bernard Darniche won Tour de Corse in 1979 and 1981 at the wheel of a Team Chardonnet entered Lancia Stratos, famously painted 'bleu de France'.

In 2011, Chardonnet was about to make his World Rally Championship debut driving Ford Fiesta R2 in WRC Academy that season. Eventually he had to withdraw from the series before the first rally, due to sponsorship difficulties.

In 2012, Chardonnet made his first WRC appearance with a WRC car, at 2012 Rallye de France. He finished tenth overall with a Citroën DS3 WRC.

In 2013, Chardonnet competed in the WRC-3 championship, driving a Citroën DS3 R3T supported by Citroën's official WRC team. He won the championship by a ten-point-margin to Keith Cronin. Chardonnet won two events in the season and finished three times in second place.

== Career results ==
=== WRC results ===
Year	Entrant	Car	1	2	3	4	5	6	7	8	9	10	11	12	13	Pos.	Points
2012	Sébastien Chardonnet	Renault Clio R3	MON; 19	SWE	MEX											30th	1
2012	Sébastien Chardonnet	Citroën DS3 R3T				POR; 25	ARG	GRE; 28	NZL	FIN; 33	GER; 15	GBR; 19				30th	1
2012	Collectif Equipe de France Rallye	Citroën DS3 WRC											FRA; 10	ITA	ESP	30th	1
2013	Sébastien Chardonnet	Citroën DS3 R3T	MON; 13	SWE	MEX	POR; 20	ARG	GRE	ITA; 21	FIN; 23	GER; 15	AUS	FRA; 14	ESP	GBR; 20	NC	0
2014	Sébastien Chardonnet	Citroën DS3 R3T	MON; 11	SWE	MEX	POR	ARG									NC	0
2014	Top Teams by MY Racing	Citroën DS3 R5						ITA; 11	POL; 43	FIN; Ret	GER; Ret	AUS	FRA; 18	ESP; Ret	GBR	NC	0
2015	Sébastien Chardonnet	Citroën DS3 WRC	MON; 47	SWE	MEX	ARG	POR	ITA	POL	FIN	GER	AUS	FRA	ESP	GBR	NC	0

==== WRC 3 results ====
Year	Entrant	Car	1	2	3	4	5	6	7	8	9	10	11	12	13	Pos.	Points
2013	Sébastien Chardonnet	Citroën DS3 R3T	MON; 1	SWE	MEX	POR; 2	ARG	GRE	ITA; 4	FIN; 2	GER; 1	AUS	FRA; 2	ESP	GBR	1st	104

==== WRC-2 results ====
Year	Entrant	Car	1	2	3	4	5	6	7	8	9	10	11	12	13	WRC-2	Points
2014	Top Teams by MY Racing	Citroën DS3 R5	MON	SWE	MEX	POR	ARG	ITA; 2	POL; 11	FIN; Ret	GER; Ret	AUS	FRA; 3	ESP; Ret	GBR	15th	33
