= Isabelle Galmiche =

French rally co-driver (born 1971)

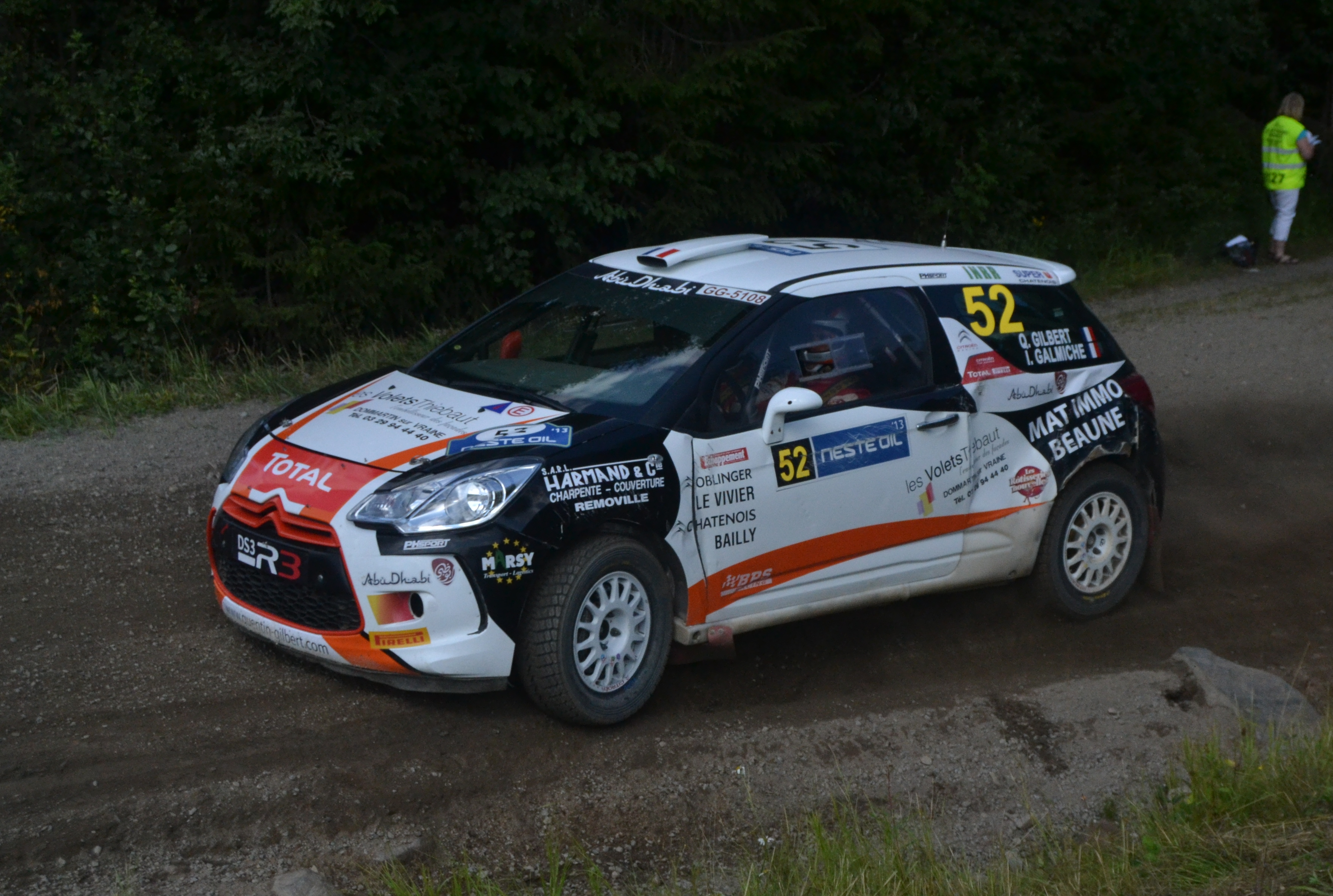

Personal information
- Nationality: (France) French
- Born: November 19, 1971 (age 55)

World Rally Championship record
- Years active: 2007, 2013, 2017, 2022–present
- Teams: M-Sport Ford
- Rallies: 10
- Championships: 0
- Rally wins: 1
- Podiums: 1
- Stage wins: 14
- First rally: 2007 Rally de Portugal
- First win: 2022 Monte Carlo Rally
- Last win: 2022 Monte Carlo Rally

Isabelle Galmiche (Gal-MEE-sh; born 19 November 1971) is a French rally co-driver and mathematics teacher. As of January 2022, she is the co-driver for nine-time World Rally Champion Sébastien Loeb, driving for M-Sport Ford in the World Rally Championship.

== Rally career ==
Galmiche and Loeb won the 90th Rally Monte Carlo on January 23, 2022, becoming the oldest driver and first female co-driver, respectively, to win a WRC rally. Galmiche became the first woman co-driver to win a WRC event since Fabrizia Pons in 1997. She has been Loeb's co-driver on tests, deputising for his former co-driver Daniel Elena on a part-time basis, since 2012.

== Rally victories ==
=== WRC victories ===
#	Event	Season	Driver	Car	Ref.
1	(Monaco) 90ème Rallye Automobile Monte-Carlo	2022	(France) Sébastien Loeb	Ford Puma Rally1	

== World Rally Championship results ==
Year	Entrant	Car	1	2	3	4	5	6	7	8	9	10	11	12	13	14	15	16	WDC	Points
2007	Dominique Rebout	Citroën C2 R2	MON	SWE	NOR	MEX	POR; 43	ARG	ITA	GRE	FIN	GER	NZL	ESP	FRA	JPN	IRE	GBR	NC	0
2013	Quentin Gilbert	Citroën DS3 R3T	MON	SWE	MEX	POR; 26	ARG	GRE	ITA; 19	FIN; 33	GER; 40	AUS	FRA	ESP	GBR				NC	0
2017	Jean-Michel Raoux	Citroën DS3 WRC	MON	SWE	MEX	FRA	ARG	POR	ITA	POL	FIN	GER; 24	ESP	GBR	AUS				NC	0
2022	M-Sport Ford WRT	Ford Puma Rally1	MON; 1	SWE	CRO	POR; Ret	ITA	KEN; 8	EST	FIN	BEL	GRE; Ret	NZL	ESP	JPN				12th	35
