= 2013 Rally Italia Sardegna =

Seventh round of the 2013 World Rally Championship season

2013 Rally Italia Sardegna Rally Italia Sardegna 2013
Round 7 of the 2013 World Rally Championship season
← Previous event	Next event →
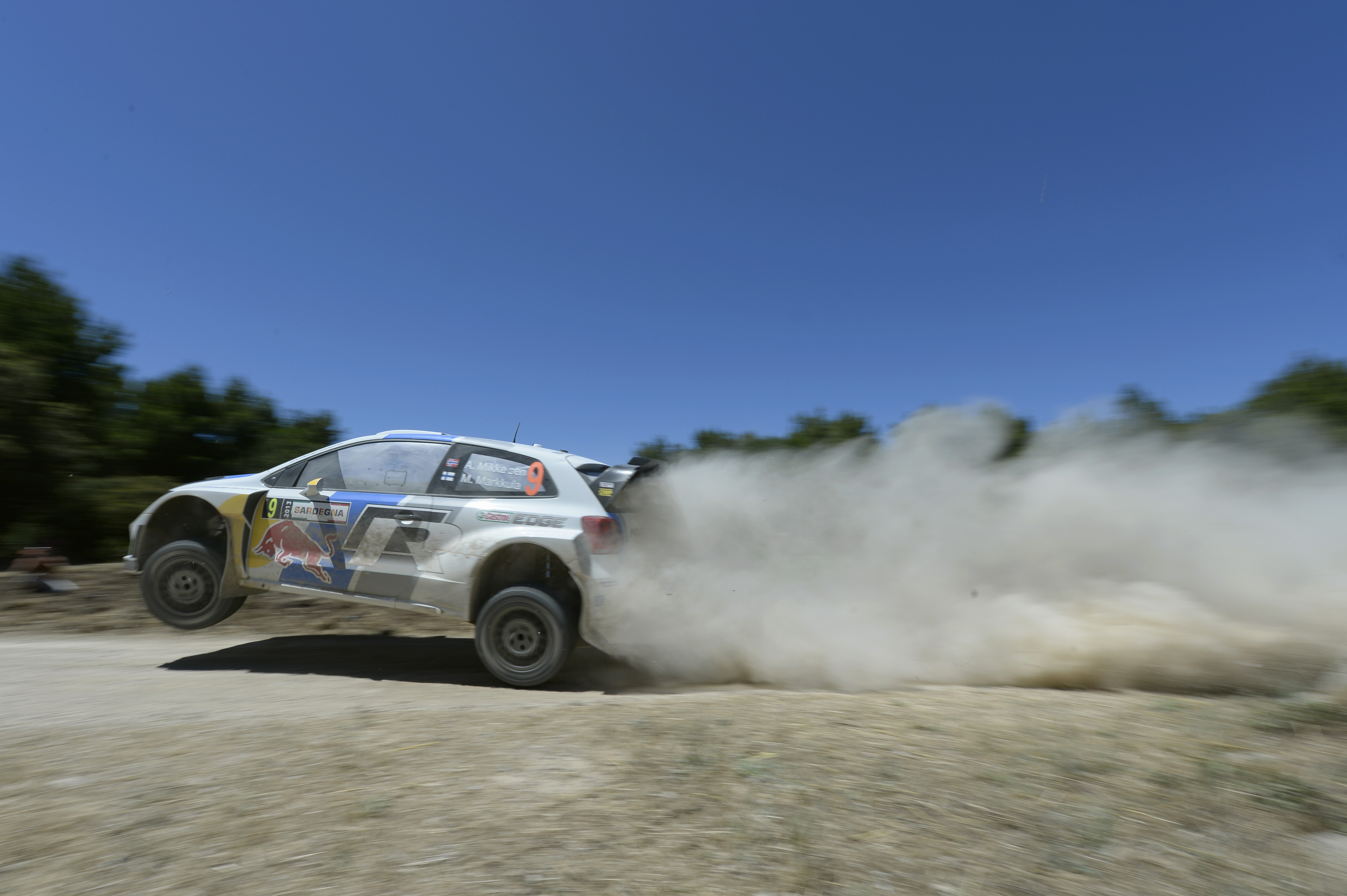
- Andreas Mikkelsen during Rally
- Host country: Italy
- Rally base: Olbia, Gallura
- Dates run: June 21 – June 23, 2013
- Stages: 23 (304.21 km; 189.03 miles)
- Stage surface: Gravel

Statistics
- Crews: 56 at start, 41 at finish

Overall results
- Overall winner: (France) Sébastien Ogier (Germany) Volkswagen Motorsport

The 2013 Rally Italia Sardegna was the seventh round of the 2013 World Rally Championship season. The event was based in Olbia, Gallura, and started on 21 June and was concluded on 23 June after twenty-three special stages, totaling 304.21 competitive kilometers.

== Report ==
Sébastien Ogier held the lead of the rally from start to finish; with three stage wins on the first day, Ogier held a lead of 46.6 seconds over Mikko Hirvonen, who battled for second with Thierry Neuville, with a difference of only 3.1 seconds at the end of the day. Both Qatar M-Sport World Rally Team drivers, Mads Østberg and Evgeny Novikov retired. On the second day, Hirvonen started with a stage win, but on the next stage went wide and got stuck into a ditch, leaving second place to Neuville. Ogier's teammate, Jari-Matti Latvala recovered from 12th position after a puncture on stage one, to finish third. Dani Sordo was the best Citroën finisher in fourth, ahead of Martin Prokop in fifth, while Elfyn Evans finished sixth on his début in a World Rally Car. Michał Kościuszko got his best result of the year in seventh, ahead of Østberg – recovering from his accident – to finish eighth via Rally-2. Robert Kubica got his first championship points by finishing ninth and Khalid Al Qassimi completed the top ten finishers.

== Entry list ==
Thirteen World Rally Cars were entered into the event, as were Thirteen WRC-2 entries and Ten WRC-3 entries.

Notable entrants
No.	Entrant	Class	Driver	Co-driver	Car	Tyre
2	(France) Citroën Total Abu Dhabi WRT	WRC	(Finland) Mikko Hirvonen	(Finland) Jarmo Lehtinen	Citroën DS3 WRC	MI
3	(France) Citroën Total Abu Dhabi WRT	WRC	(Spain) Dani Sordo	(Spain) Carlos del Barrio	Citroën DS3 WRC	MI
4	(United Kingdom) Qatar M-Sport WRT	WRC	(Norway) Mads Østberg	(Sweden) Jonas Andersson	Ford Fiesta RS WRC	MI
5	(United Kingdom) Qatar M-Sport WRT	WRC	(Russia) Evgeny Novikov	(Austria) Ilka Minor	Ford Fiesta RS WRC	MI
6	(United Kingdom) Qatar World Rally Team	WRC	(United Kingdom) Elfyn Evans	(Italy) Giovanni Bernacchini	Ford Fiesta RS WRC	MI
7	(Germany) Volkswagen Motorsport	WRC	(Finland) Jari-Matti Latvala	(Finland) Miikka Anttila	Volkswagen Polo R WRC	MI
8	(Germany) Volkswagen Motorsport	WRC	(France) Sébastien Ogier	(France) Julien Ingrassia	Volkswagen Polo R WRC	MI
9	(Germany) Volkswagen Motorsport II	WRC	(Norway) Andreas Mikkelsen	(Finland) Mikko Markkula	Volkswagen Polo R WRC	MI
10	(France) Abu Dhabi Citroën Total WRT	WRC	(United Arab Emirates) Khalid Al Qassimi	(United Kingdom) Scott Martin	Citroën DS3 WRC	MI
11	(United Kingdom) Qatar World Rally Team	WRC	(Belgium) Thierry Neuville	(Belgium) Nicolas Gilsoul	Ford Fiesta RS WRC	MI
12	(Poland) Lotos Team WRC	WRC	(Poland) Michal Kościuszko	(Poland) Maciej Szczepaniak	Ford Fiesta RS WRC	MI
21	(Czech Republic) Jipocar Czech National Team	WRC	(Czech Republic) Martin Prokop	(Czech Republic) Michal Ernst	Ford Fiesta RS WRC	MI
22	(Ukraine) AT Rally Team	WRC	(Sweden) Per-Gunnar Andersson	(Sweden) Emil Axelsson	Ford Fiesta RS WRC	MI
32	(Germany) Škoda Auto Deutschland	WRC-2	(Germany) Sepp Wiegand	(Germany) Frank Christian	Škoda Fabia S2000	MI
33	(Austria) Stohl Racing	WRC-2	(Germany) Armin Kremer	(Germany) Klaus Wicha	Subaru Impreza WRX STi	MI
37	(Italy) Lorenzo Bertelli	WRC-2	(Italy) Lorenzo Bertelli	(Italy) Mitia Dotta	Ford Fiesta RRC	MI
40	(Kazakhstan) Arman Smailov	WRC-2	(Kazakhstan) Arman Smailov	(Russia) Andrei Rusov	Subaru Impreza WRX STi	MI
41	(Peru) Nicolás Fuchs	WRC-2	(Peru) Nicolás Fuchs	(Argentina) Fernando Mussano	Mitsubishi Lancer Evo X	DM
46	(Italy) Marco Vallario	WRC-2	(Italy) Marco Vallario	(Italy) Antonio Pascale	Mitsubishi Lancer Evo X	DM
48	Seashore Qatar Rally Team	WRC-2	(Qatar) Abdulaziz Al-Kuwari	(Republic of Ireland) Killian Duffy	Ford Fiesta RRC	MI
49	(Ukraine) Mentos Ascania Racing	WRC-2	(Ukraine) Oleksiy Kikireshko	(Estonia) Sergei Larens	Mini John Cooper Works S2000	MI
50	(Ukraine) Mentos Ascania Racing	WRC-2	(Ukraine) Valeriy Gorban	(Ukraine) Volodymir Korsia	Mini John Cooper Works S2000	MI
51	(France) Sébastien Chardonnet	WRC-3	(France) Sébastien Chardonnet	(France) Thibault de la Haye	Citroën DS3 R3T	P
52	(France) Quentin Gilbert	WRC-3	(France) Quentin Gilbert	(France) Isabelle Galmiche	Citroën DS3 R3T	P
53	(France) Saintéloc Racing	WRC-3	(United Kingdom) Alastair Fisher	(United Kingdom) Gordon Noble	Citroën DS3 R3T	P
56	(Switzerland) Francesco Parli	WRC-3	(Switzerland) Francesco Parli	(Italy) Tania Canton	Citroën DS3 R3T	P
57	(Switzerland) Federico Della Casa	WRC-3	(Switzerland) Federico Della Casa	(Switzerland) Marco Menchini	Citroën DS3 R3T	P
58	(Germany) ADAC Team Weser-Ems	WRC-3	(Germany) Christian Riedemann	(Belgium) Lara Vanneste	Citroën DS3 R3T	P
59	(France) Bryan Bouffier	WRC-3	(France) Bryan Bouffier	(France) Xavier Panseri	Citroën DS3 R3T	P
60	(United Kingdom) Charles Hurst Citroën Belfast	WRC-3	(Republic of Ireland) Keith Cronin	(United Kingdom) Marshall Clarke	Citroën DS3 R3T	P
61	(France) Saintéloc Racing	WRC-3	(Italy) Simone Campedelli	(Italy) Danilo Fappani	Citroën DS3 R3T	P
62	(France) Stéphane Consani	WRC-3	(France) Stéphane Consani	(France) Maxime Vilmot	Citroën DS3 R3T	P
71	(Jordan) Motortune Racing	WRC-2	(Jordan) Ala'a Rasheed	(Lebanon) Joseph Matar	Ford Fiesta RRC	DM
72	(Argentina) Juan Carlos Alonso	WRC-2	(Argentina) Juan Carlos Alonso	(Argentina) Juan Pablo Monasterolo	Mitsubishi Lancer Evo X	DM
74	(Poland) Robert Kubica	WRC-2	(Poland) Robert Kubica	(Poland) Maciek Baran	Citroën DS3 RRC	MI
82	(Estonia) MM Motorsport	WRC-2	(Ukraine) Yuriy Protasov	(Estonia) Kuldar Sikk	Ford Fiesta RRC	MI

Icon	Class
WRC	WRC entries eligible to score manufacturer points
WRC	Major entry ineligible to score manufacturer points
WRC-2	Registered to take part in WRC-2 championship
WRC-3	Registered to take part in WRC-3 championship
J-WRC	Registered to take part in Junior WRC championship

== Event Standing ==
Pos.	Driver	Co-driver	Car	Time	Difference	Points
Overall Classification
1.	(France) Sébastien Ogier	(France) Julien Ingrassia	Volkswagen Polo R WRC	3:22:57.9	0.0	28
2.	(Belgium) Thierry Neuville	(Belgium) Nicolas Gilsoul	Ford Fiesta RS WRC	3:24:14.7	+1:16.8	20
3.	(Finland) Jari-Matti Latvala	(Finland) Miikka Anttila	Volkswagen Polo R WRC	3:24:45.9	+1:48.0	16
4.	(Spain) Dani Sordo	(Spain) Carlos del Barrio	Citroën DS3 WRC	3:26:17.1	+3:19.2	12
5.	(Czech Republic) Martin Prokop	(Czech Republic) Michal Ernst	Ford Fiesta RS WRC	3:31:32.0	+8:34.1	10
6.	(United Kingdom) Elfyn Evans	(Italy) Giovanni Bernacchini	Ford Fiesta RS WRC	3:34:49.7	+11:51.8	8
7.	(Poland) Michal Kościuszko	(Poland) Maciej Szczepaniak	Ford Fiesta RS WRC	3:34:50.6	+11:52.7	6
8.	(Norway) Mads Østberg	(Sweden) Jonas Andersson	Ford Fiesta RS WRC	3:36:19.4	+13:21.5	4
9. (1. WRC-2)	(Poland) Robert Kubica	(Poland) Maciek Baran	Citroën DS3 RRC	3:39:45.5	+16:47.6	2
10.	(United Arab Emirates) Khalid Al Qassimi	(United Kingdom) Scott Martin	Citroën DS3 WRC	3:40:17.8	+17:19.9	1
WRC-2
1. (9.)	(Poland) Robert Kubica	(Poland) Maciek Baran	Citroën DS3 RRC	3:39:45.5	0.0	25
2. (11.)	(Qatar) Abdulaziz Al-Kuwari	(Republic of Ireland) Killian Duffy	Ford Fiesta RRC	3:44:02.5	+4:17.0	18
3. (12.)	(Italy) Lorenzo Bertelli	(Italy) Mitia Dotta	Ford Fiesta RRC	3:46:04.0	+6:18.5	15
4. (14.)	(Peru) Nicolás Fuchs	(Argentina) Fernando Mussano	Mitsubishi Lancer Evo X	3:48:33.4	+8:47.9	12
5. (15.)	(Germany) Armin Kremer	(Germany) Klaus Wicha	Subaru Impreza WRX STi	3:50:26.5	+10:41.0	10
6. (23.)	(Argentina) Juan Carlos Alonso	(Argentina) Juan Pablo Monasterolo	Mitsubishi Lancer Evo X	4:06:49.9	+27:04.4	8
7. (28.)	(Jordan) Ala'a Rasheed	(Lebanon) Joseph Matar	Ford Fiesta RRC	4:16:37.3	+36:51.8	6
8. (30.)	(Italy) Marco Vallario	(Italy) Antonio Pascale	Mitsubishi Lancer Evo X	4:23:33.8	+43:48.3	4
WRC-3
1. (16.)	(Germany) Christian Riedemann	(Belgium) Lara Vanneste	Citroën DS3 R3T	3:52:39.9	0.0	25
2. (17.)	(Republic of Ireland) Keith Cronin	(United Kingdom) Marshall Clarke	Citroën DS3 R3T	3:57:45.3	+5:05.4	18
3. (19.)	(France) Quentin Gilbert	(France) Isabelle Galmiche	Citroën DS3 R3T	4:01:59.2	+9:19.3	15
4. (21.)	(France) Sébastien Chardonnet	(France) Thibault de la Haye	Citroën DS3 R3T	4:04:17.5	+11:37.6	12
5. (25.)	(Switzerland) Federico Della Casa	(Switzerland) Marco Menchini	Citroën DS3 R3T	4:08:14.0	+15:34.1	10
6. (27.)	(France) Stéphane Consani	(France) Maxime Vilmot	Citroën DS3 R3T	4:13:53.5	+21:13.6	8
7. (29.)	(Switzerland) Francesco Parli	(Italy) Tania Canton	Citroën DS3 R3T	4:18:52.2	+26:12.3	6
8. (31.)	(France) Bryan Bouffier	(France) Xavier Panseri	Citroën DS3 R3T	4:24:54.4	+32:14.5	4
9. (33.)	(United Kingdom) Alastair Fisher	(United Kingdom) Gordon Noble	Citroën DS3 R3T	4:33:54.9	+41:15.0	2
