= 2013 Rallye Deutschland =

Motor rally competition

2013 Rallye Deutschland 31st ADAC Rallye Deutschland
Round 9 of 13 in the 2013 World Rally Championship
← Previous event	Next event →
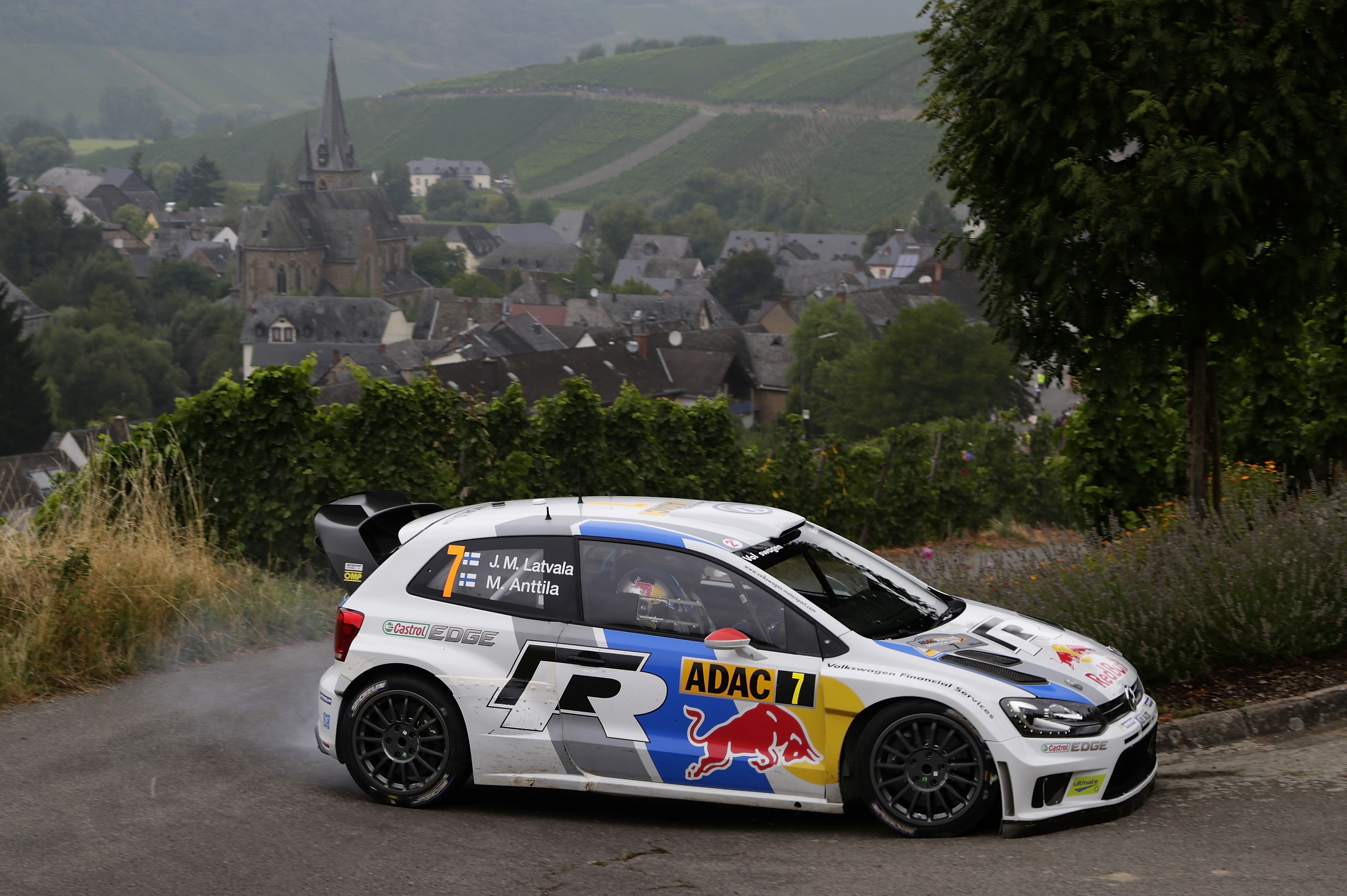
- Host country: Germany
- Rally base: Trier
- Dates run: August 22 – 25, 2013
- Stages: 16 (371.86 km; 231.06 miles)
- Stage surface: Asphalt

Statistics
- Crews: 76 at start, 52 at finish

Overall results
- Overall winner: (Spain) Dani Sordo (Spain) Carlos del Barrio (France) Citroën Total Abu Dhabi WRT; 3:15:19.4
- Power Stage winner: (France) Sébastien Ogier (France) Julien Ingrassia (Germany) Volkswagen Motorsport

The 31st ADAC Rallye Deutschland was the ninth round of the 2013 World Rally Championship, held from 22 to 25 August, 2013. Dani Sordo emerged victorious in his first ever WRC victory.

== Results ==
=== Event standings ===
Pos.	No.	Driver	Co-Driver	Team	Car	Class	Time	Difference	Points
Overall classification
1	3	(Spain) Dani Sordo	(Spain) Carlos del Barrio	(France) Citroën Total Abu Dhabi WRT	Citroën DS3 WRC	WRC	3:15:19.4	0.0	27
2	11	(Belgium) Thierry Neuville	(Belgium) Nicolas Gilsoul	(United Kingdom) Qatar World Rally Team	Ford Fiesta RS WRC	WRC	3:16:12.4	+53.0	18
3	2	(Finland) Mikko Hirvonen	(Finland) Jarmo Lehtinen	(France) Citroën Total Abu Dhabi WRT	Citroën DS3 WRC	WRC	3:17:55.5	+2:36.1	15
4	21	(Czech Republic) Martin Prokop	(Czech Republic) Michal Ernst	(Czech Republic) Jipocar Czech National Team	Ford Fiesta RS WRC	WRC	3:23:20.2	+8:00.8	12
5	74	(Poland) Robert Kubica	(Poland) Maciej Baran	(France) PH-Sport	Citroën DS3 RRC	WRC-2	3:24:20.7	+9:01.3	10
6	75	(United Kingdom) Elfyn Evans	(United Kingdom) Daniel Barritt	(United Kingdom) Qatar M-Sport World Rally Team	Ford Fiesta R5	WRC-2	3:24:33.6	+9:14.2	8
7	7	(Finland) Jari-Matti Latvala	(Finland) Miikka Anttila	(Germany) Volkswagen Motorsport	Volkswagen Polo R WRC	WRC	3:25:14.4	+9:55.0	7
8	84	(New Zealand) Hayden Paddon	(New Zealand) John Kennard	(Austria) BRR Team	Škoda Fabia S2000	WRC-2	3:28:20.6	+13:01.2	4
9	4	(Norway) Mads Østberg	(Sweden) Jonas Andersson	(United Kingdom) Qatar M-Sport World Rally Team	Ford Fiesta RS WRC	WRC	3:38:47.5	+13:28.1	2
10	5	(Russia) Evgeniy Novikov	(Austria) Ilka Minor-Petrasko	(United Kingdom) Qatar M-Sport World Rally Team	Ford Fiesta RS WRC	WRC	3:30:37.3	+15:17.9	1
WRC-2 standings
1 (5.)	74	(Poland) Robert Kubica	(Poland) Maciej Baran	(France) PH-Sport	Citroën DS3 RRC	WRC-2	3:24:20.7	0.0	25
2 (6.)	75	(United Kingdom) Elfyn Evans	(United Kingdom) Daniel Barrit	(United Kingdom) Qatar M-Sport World Rally Team	Ford Fiesta R5	WRC-2	3:24:33.6	+12.9	18
3 (8.)	84	(New Zealand) Hayden Paddon	(New Zealand) John Kennard	(Austria) BRR Team	Škoda Fabia S2000	WRC-2	3:28:20.6	+3:59.9	15
4 (14.)	32	(Germany) Sepp Wiegand	(Germany) Franz Christian	(Germany) Škoda Auto Deutschland	Škoda Fabia S2000	WRC-2	3:38:22.1	+14:01.4	12
5 (18.)	82	(Estonia) Karl Kruuda	(Estonia) Martin Järveoja	(Estonia) Markko Märtin	Ford Fiesta R5	WRC-2	3:42:43.3	+18:22.6	10
6 (19.)	36	(United Arab Emirates) Rashid al-Ketbi	(Germany) Karina Hepperle	(United Arab Emirates) Skydive Dubai Rally Team	Ford Fiesta R5	WRC-2	3:44:11.7	+19:51.0	8
7 (32.)	38	(Mexico) Ricardo Triviño	(Spain) Alex Haro	(Mexico) Moto Club Igualda	Subaru Impreza WRX STi	WRC-2	4:08:43.5	+44:22.8	6
8 (34.)	36	(Italy) Marco Vallario	(Italy) Antonio Pascale	(Italy) Vomero Racing	Mitsubishi Lancer Evo X	WRC-2	4:09:11.6	+44:50.9	4
9 (35.)	86	(Venezuela) Carlos Garcia Fessman	(Portugal) Hugo Magalhães	Ralliart Italy	Mitsubishi Lancer Evo X	WRC-2	4:09:31.5	+45.10.8	2
WRC-3 standings
1 (15.)	51	(France) Sébastien Chardonnet	(France) Thibault de la Haye	(Belgium) MY Racing	Citroën DS3 R3T	WRC-3	3:39:26.6	0.0	25
2 (16.)	60	(Republic of Ireland) Keith Cronin	(United Kingdom) Marshall Clarke	(United Kingdom) Charles Hurst Citroën Belfast	Citroën DS3 R3T	WRC-3	3:41:56.9	+2:24.3	18
3 (26.)	58	(Germany) Christian Riedemann	(Belgium) Lara Vanneste	(Germany) ADAC Team Wesser-Ems	Citroën DS3 R3T	WRC-3	4:02:20.3	+22:47.7	15
4 (29.)	64	(United Arab Emirates) Mohamed al-Mutawaa	(United Kingdom) Stephen McAuley	(France) Abu Dhabi Racing	Citroën DS3 R3T	WRC-3	4:04:43.1	+25:10.5	12
5 (40.)	52	(France) Quentin Gilbert	(France) Isabelle Galmiche	(France) PH Sport	Citroën DS3 R3T	WRC-3	4:20:47.8	+41:15.2	10
JWRC standings^{†}
1	102	(Sweden) Pontus Tidemand	(Norway) Ola Fløene	(Sweden) Pontus Tidemand	Ford Fiesta R2	JWRC	3:09:26.8	0.0	28
2	107	(Switzerland) Michaël Burri	(France) Gabin Moreau	(Switzerland) Michaël Burri	Ford Fiesta R2	JWRC	3:11:14.3	+1:47.5	18
3	110	(Spain) Yeray Lemes	(Spain) Rogelio Peñate	(Spain) Yeray Lemes	Ford Fiesta R2	JWRC	3:11:38.0	+2:11.2	20
4	103	(Slovakia) Martin Koči	(Czech Republic) Petr Starý	(Slovakia) Styllex Motorsport	Ford Fiesta R2	JWRC	3:12:24.3	+2:57.5	12
5	105	(Spain) José Antonio Suárez	(Spain) Cándido Carrera	(Spain) ACSM Rallye Team	Ford Fiesta R2	JWRC	3:13:58.4	+4:31.6	15
6	100	(Estonia) Sander Pärn	(Estonia) Ken Järveoja	(Estonia) Sander Pärn	Ford Fiesta R2	JWRC	3:16:31.9	+7:05.1	8
7	106	(Turkey) Murat Bostancı	(Turkey) Onur Vatansever	(Turkey) Castrol Ford Team Türkiye	Ford Fiesta R2	JWRC	3:21:25.7	+11:58.9	6
8	108	(Finland) Niko-Pekka Nieminen	(Finland) Mikael Korhonen	(Finland) Niko-Pekka Nieminen	Ford Fiesta R2	JWRC	3:21:48.9	+12:22.1	4
9	111	(Belgium) Pieter-Jan-Michiel Cracco	(Belgium) Frédéric Miclotte	(Belgium) Pieter-Jan-Michiel Cracco	Ford Fiesta R2	JWRC	3:27:25.8	+17:59.0	2
10	109	(Norway) Marius Aasen	(Norway) Marlene Engan	(Norway) Marius Aasen	Ford Fiesta R2	JWRC	3:49:03.1	+39:36.3	1

^† - The Junior WRC contests only the first 14 stages of the rally.

=== Special Stages ===
Day	Stage	Name	Length	Winner	Car	Time	Rally Leader
Leg 1 (22 August)	SS1	Blankenheim	23.54 km	(France) Sébastien Ogier	Volkswagen Polo R WRC	12:09.8	(France) Sébastien Ogier
Leg 1 (22 August)	SS2	Sauertal	14.10 km	(France) Sébastien Ogier	Volkswagen Polo R WRC	7:23.4	(France) Sébastien Ogier
Leg 2 (23 August)	SS3	Mittelmosel 1	22.95 km	(Belgium) Thierry Neuville	Ford Fiesta RS WRC	13:33.9	(Finland) Jari-Matti Latvala
Leg 2 (23 August)	SS4	Moselland 1	22.79 km	(Belgium) Thierry Neuville	Ford Fiesta RS WRC	14:10.9	(Finland) Jari-Matti Latvala
Leg 2 (23 August)	SS5	Grafschaft 1	19.94 km	(Belgium) Thierry Neuville	Ford Fiesta RS WRC	11:44.3	(Finland) Jari-Matti Latvala
Leg 2 (23 August)	SS6	Mittelmosel 2	22.95 km	(Belgium) Thierry Neuville	Ford Fiesta RS WRC	13:20.1	(Finland) Jari-Matti Latvala
Leg 2 (23 August)	SS7	Moselland 2	22.79 km	(Finland) Jari-Matti Latvala	Volkswagen Polo R WRC	13:57.9	(Finland) Jari-Matti Latvala
Leg 2 (23 August)	SS8	Grafschaft 2	19.94 km	(Finland) Jari-Matti Latvala	Volkswagen Polo R WRC	11:33.1	(Finland) Jari-Matti Latvala
Leg 3 (24 August)	SS9	Stein & Wein 1	26.54 km	(France) Sébastien Ogier	Volkswagen Polo R WRC	14:54.9	(Finland) Jari-Matti Latvala
Leg 3 (24 August)	SS10	Peterburg 1	9.23 km	(Spain) Dani Sordo	Citroën DS3 WRC	5:08.9	(Finland) Jari-Matti Latvala
Leg 3 (24 August)	SS11	Arena Panzerplatte 1	41.08 km	(France) Sébastien Ogier	Volkswagen Polo R WRC	23:33.8	(Finland) Jari-Matti Latvala
Leg 3 (24 August)	SS12	Stein & Wein 2	26.54 km	(France) Sébastien Ogier	Volkswagen Polo R WRC	15:51.8	(Belgium) Thierry Neuville
Leg 3 (24 August)	SS13	Peterburg 2	9.23 km	(Spain) Dani Sordo	Citroën DS3 WRC	5:29.8	(Spain) Dani Sordo
Leg 3 (24 August)	SS14	Arena Panzerplatte 2	41.08 km	Stage Cancelled			
Leg 4 (25 August)	SS15	Dhrontal 1	24.58 km	(Spain) Dani Sordo	Citroën DS3 WRC	15:49.1	(Spain) Dani Sordo
Leg 4 (25 August)	SS16	Dhrontal 2	24.58 km	(France) Sébastien Ogier	Volkswagen Polo R WRC	15:37.9	(Spain) Dani Sordo

=== Power Stage ===
The "Power Stage" was a 24.58 km (15.27 mi) stage at the end of the rally.

Pos.	Driver	Car	Time	Diff.	Pts.
1	(France) Sébastien Ogier	Volkswagen Polo R WRC	15:37.9	0.0	3
2	(Spain) Dani Sordo	Citroën DS3 WRC	15:41.8	+3.9	2
3	(Finland) Jari-Matti Latvala	Volkswagen Polo R WRC	15:49.5	+11.6	1

=== Standings after the rally ===
Drivers' Championship standings

Pos.	Driver	Points
1	(France) Sébastien Ogier	181
2	(Belgium) Thierry Neuville	109
3	(Finland) Jari-Matti Latvala	97
4	(Spain) Dani Sordo	96
5	(Finland) Mikko Hirvonen	88

Manufacturers' Championship standings

Pos.	Manufacturer	Points
1	(Germany) Volkswagen Motorsport	262
2	(France) Citroën Total Abu Dhabi WRT	236
3	(United Kingdom) Qatar World Rally Team	127
4	(United Kingdom) Qatar M-Sport World Rally Team	126
5	(Czech Republic) Jipocar Czech National Team	51

=== Other ===
WRC-2 Drivers' Championship standings

Pos.	Driver	Points
1	(Poland) Robert Kubica	101
2	(Qatar) Abdulaziz Al-Kuwari	93
3	(Peru) Nicolás Fuchs	78
4	(Germany) Sepp Wiegand	67
5	(Ukraine) Yuriy Protasov	65

WRC-3 Drivers' Championship standings

Pos.	Driver	Points
1	(France) Sébastien Chardonnet	98
2	(Republic of Ireland) Keith Cronin	71
3	(France) Quentin Gilbert	50
4	(Germany) Christian Riedemann	40
5	(France) Bryan Bouffier	29

JWRC Drivers' Championship standings

Pos.	Driver	Points
1	(Sweden) Pontus Tidemand	105
2	(Spain) José Antonio Suárez	63
3	(Estonia) Sander Pärn	51
4	(Spain) Yeray Lemes	51
5	(Switzerland) Michaël Burri	38
