= Arman Smailov =

Personal information
- Nationality: Kazakh
- Born: August 26, 1981 (age 45); Almaty, Kazakhstan

World Rally Championship record
- Years active: 2010, 2013
- Teams: Tommi Mäkinen Racing
- Rallies: 7
- Championships: 0
- Rally wins: 0
- Podiums: 0
- Stage wins: 0
- Total points: 0
- First rally: 2010 Rally Finland
- Last rally: 2013 Rally Australia

Arman Smailov (Kazakh: Арман Смаилов, Arman Smaılov; born 26 August 1981) is a rally driver from Kazakhstan. Making his WRC debut at the 2010 Rally Finland made Smailov the first WRC driver from independent Kazakhstan. He has set many Kazakh records in the World Rally Championship in the process.

In 2013, he drove in the 2013 WRC-2 season in a Subaru Impreza STi, and recorded a best finish of 4th in Australia, winning the Production Class. This made him the first Kazakh winner.
