= Marco Menchini =

Italian bobsledder (born 1968)

Personal information
- Nationality: Italian
- Born: 20 November 1968 (age 56); Aosta, Italy

Sport
- Sport: Bobsleigh

Marco Menchini (born 20 November 1968) is an Italian bobsledder. He competed in the four man event at the 1998 Winter Olympics.
