= Michał Kościuszko =

Polish rally driver (born 1985)

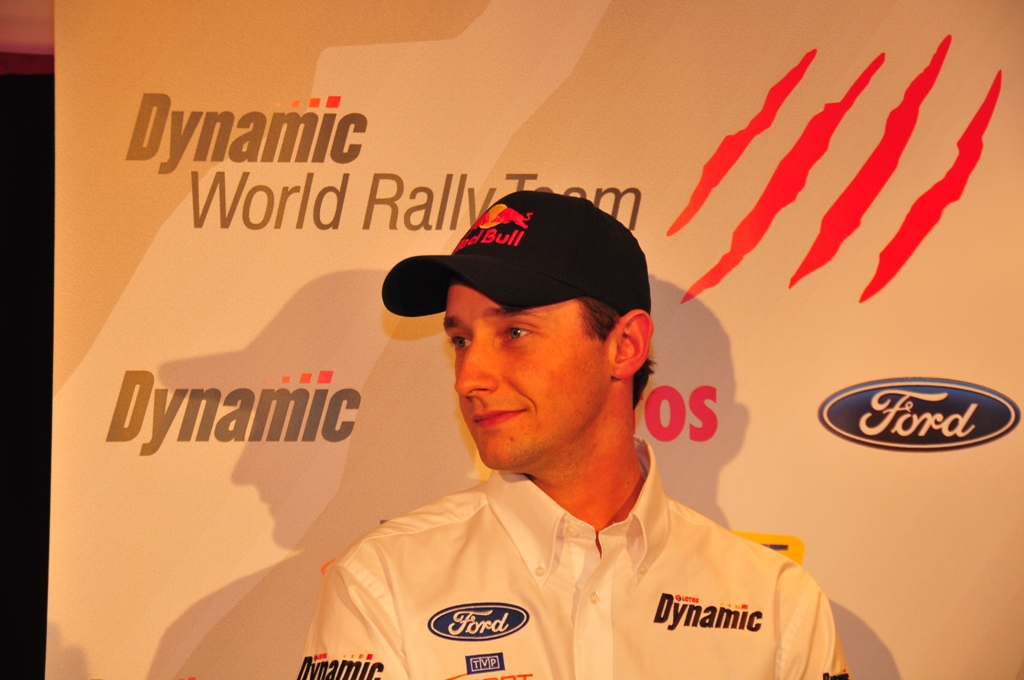
- Kościuszko in 2010

Personal information
- Nationality: (Poland) Polish
- Full name: Michał Jan Kościuszko
- Born: 20 April 1985 (age 41)

World Rally Championship record
- Years active: 2006–2013
- Co-driver: (Poland) Jarosław Baran (Poland) Maciej Szczepaniak
- Teams: Suzuki, Dynamic
- Rallies: 52
- Championships: 0
- Rally wins: 0
- Podiums: 0
- Stage wins: 0
- Total points: 13
- First rally: 2006 Swedish Rally
- Last rally: 2013 Rallye Deutschland

Michał Jan Kościuszko (born 20 April 1985 in Kraków) is a Polish rally driver who currently competes in the Production World Rally Championship (PWRC). He has previously won rounds of the Junior World Rally Championship (JWRC) and has competed in the Super 2000 World Rally Championship (SWRC).

== Career ==
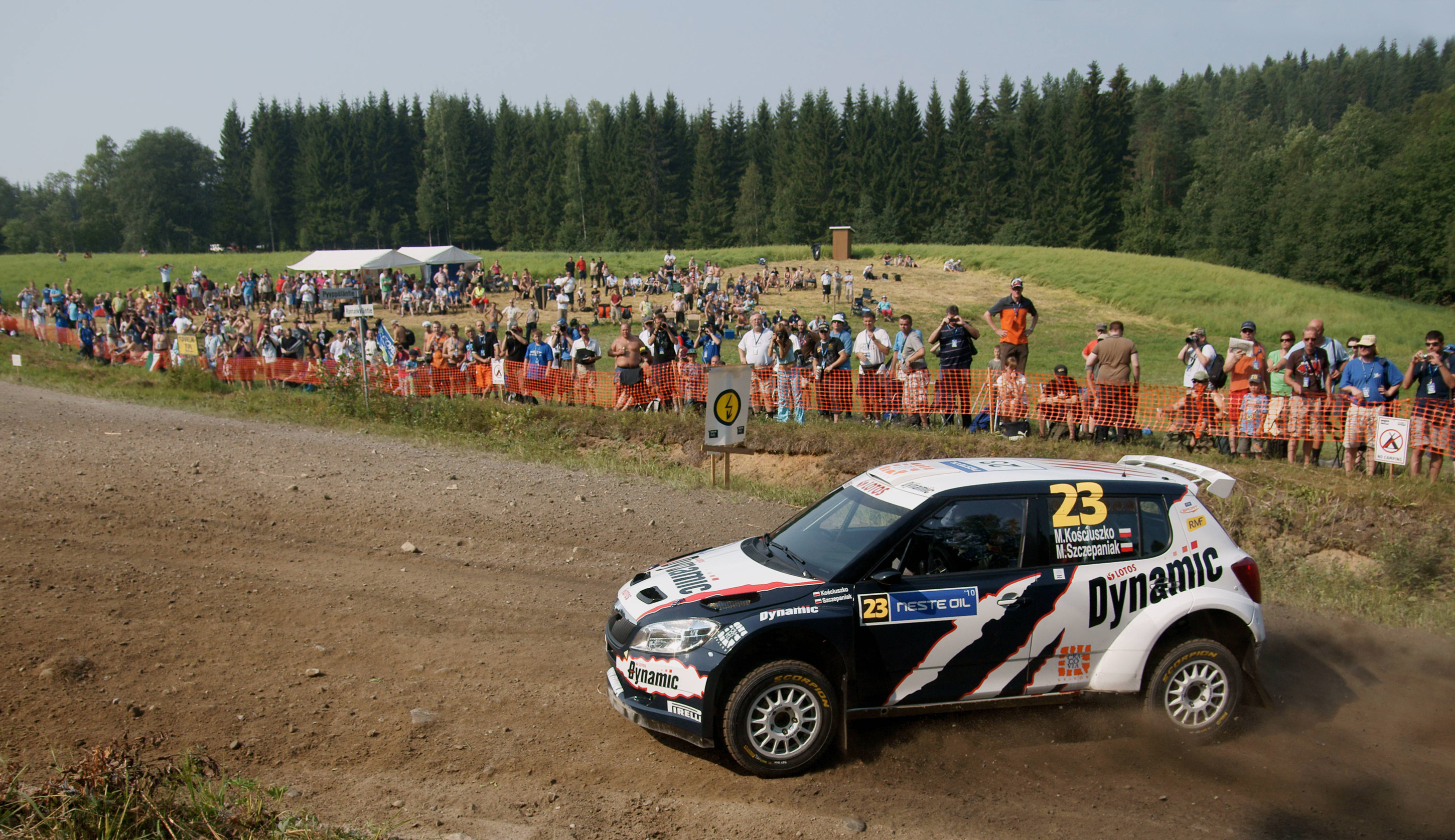
Kościuszko on Rally Finland in 2010.

Kościuszko began his motorsport career as a 15-year-old in karting. At 17, he switched to rallying. In 2006, he began competing in the JWRC in a Suzuki Ignis S1600. In 2007, he switched to a Renault Clio S1600, finishing third in the category on Rally Finland. He returned to Suzuki for the final round of the season in a Swift S1600 and continued using the model in 2008. He finished third in the JWRC category and tenth overall on the 2008 Rally Mexico, before winning the next round in Sardinia. He finished the season in fifth in the standings. He continued with Suzuki in 2009, winning in Portugal and Argentina and finishing runner-up overall.

In 2010, Kościuszko made the move to the SWRC, starting the season in a Ford Fiesta S2000. After a podium on the opening round in Mexico he switched to a Skoda Fabia S2000 from his third round of the season in Portugal, where he finished third. He scored a further podium in France on his way to fifth in the final standings. For 2011, he switched to the PWRC, driving a Mitsubishi Lancer Evo X.

== WRC results ==
Year	Entrant	Car	1	2	3	4	5	6	7	8	9	10	11	12	13	14	15	16	WDC	Points
2006	Michał Kościuszko	Suzuki Ignis S1600	MON	SWE; 37	MEX	ESP; 24	FRA	ARG	ITA; 32	GRE; 28	GER; 46	FIN; Ret	JPN	CYP	TUR; 27	AUS	NZL	GBR	NC	0
2007	Michał Kościuszko	Renault Clio S1600	MON	SWE	NOR	MEX	POR; Ret	ARG	ITA; 44	GRE	FIN; 22	GER; Ret	NZL	ESP; Ret					NC	0
2007	Michał Kościuszko	Suzuki Swift S1600													FRA; 28	JPN	IRE		NC	0
2007	Michał Kościuszko	Abarth Grande Punto S2000																GBR; 20	NC	0
2008	Michał Kościuszko	Suzuki Swift S1600	MON	SWE	MEX; 10	ARG	JOR; Ret	ITA; 15	GRE	TUR	FIN; 22	GER	NZL	ESP; 30	FRA; Ret	JPN	GBR		NC	0
2009	Michał Kościuszko	Suzuki Swift S1600	IRE	NOR	CYP; 17	POR; 13	ARG; 14	ITA; 13	GRE	POL; Ret	FIN; 18	AUS	ESP	GBR					NC	0
2010	Dynamic WRT	Ford Fiesta S2000	SWE	MEX; 20	JOR; Ret	TUR	NZL												NC	0
2010	Dynamic WRT	Škoda Fabia S2000						POR; 13	BUL	FIN; 16	GER; 28	JPN	FRA; 14	ESP	GBR; 15				NC	0
2011	Lotos Dynamic Rally Team	Mitsubishi Lancer Evo X	SWE	MEX	POR; 24	JOR	ITA	ARG; 20	GRE	FIN; 25	GER	AUS; 7	FRA	ESP; 22	GBR; 16				21st	6
2012	Lotos Dynamic Rally Team	Mitsubishi Lancer Evo X	MON; 30	SWE	MEX; 14	POR	ARG; Ret	GRE	NZL	FIN	GER; 13	GBR	FRA	ITA; 21	ESP; 31				NC	0
2013	Lotos Team WRC	Mini John Cooper Works WRC	MON; 10	SWE; 14	MEX; Ret	POR; Ret	ARG; Ret	GRE; WD											19th	7
2013	Lotos Team WRC	Ford Fiesta RS WRC							ITA; 7	FIN	GER; Ret	AUS	FRA	ESP	GBR				19th	7

=== JWRC results ===
Year	Entrant	Car	1	2	3	4	5	6	7	8	9	JWRC	Points
2006	Michał Kościuszko	Suzuki Ignis S1600	SWE; 8	ESP; 5	FRA	ARG	ITA; 10	GER; 11	FIN; Ret	TUR; 10	GBR	19th	5
2007	Michał Kościuszko	Renault Clio S1600	NOR	POR; Ret	ITA; 12	FIN; 3	GER; Ret	ESP; Ret				11th	6
2007	Michał Kościuszko	Suzuki Swift S1600							FRA; 9			11th	6
2008	Michał Kościuszko	Suzuki Swift S1600	MEX; 3	JOR; Ret	ITA; 1	FIN; 3	GER	ESP; 9	FRA; Ret			5th	22
2009	Michał Kościuszko	Suzuki Swift S1600	IRE	CYP; 2	POR; 1	ARG; 1	ITA; 2	POL; Ret	FIN; 3	ESP		2nd	42

=== SWRC results ===
Year	Entrant	Car	1	2	3	4	5	6	7	8	9	10	SWRC	Points
2010	Dynamic WRT	Ford Fiesta S2000	SWE	MEX; 3	JOR; Ret	NZL							5th	73
2010	Dynamic WRT	Škoda Fabia S2000					POR; 3	FIN; 5	GER; 6	JPN	FRA; 3	GBR; 5	5th	73

=== PWRC results ===
Year	Entrant	Car	1	2	3	4	5	6	7	8	PWRC	Points
2011	Lotos Dynamic Rally Team	Mitsubishi Lancer Evo X	SWE	POR; 7	ARG; 10	FIN; 5	AUS; 2	ESP; 2	GBR; 3		3rd	68
2012	Lotos Dynamic Rally Team	Mitsubishi Lancer Evo X	MON; 1	MEX; 3	ARG; Ret	GRE	NZL	GER; 1	ITA; 6	ESP; 6	4th	81
