= Lotos Team WRC =

World Rally Championship manufacturer team

- Full name: Lotos Team WRC
- Team principal(s): (Italy) Bruno di Pianto
- Drivers: (Poland) Michał Kościuszko
- Co-drivers: (Poland) Maciej Szczepaniak
- Chassis: Mini John Cooper Works WRC; Ford Fiesta WRC
- Tyres: Michelin

World Rally Championship history
- Debut: 2013
- Manufacturers' Championships: 0
- Drivers' Championships: 0
- Rally wins: 0

The Lotos Team WRC is a Polish motor racing team that made its debut in the World Rally Championship at the 2013 Rallye Monte Carlo.

== Competition history ==
=== 2013 season ===
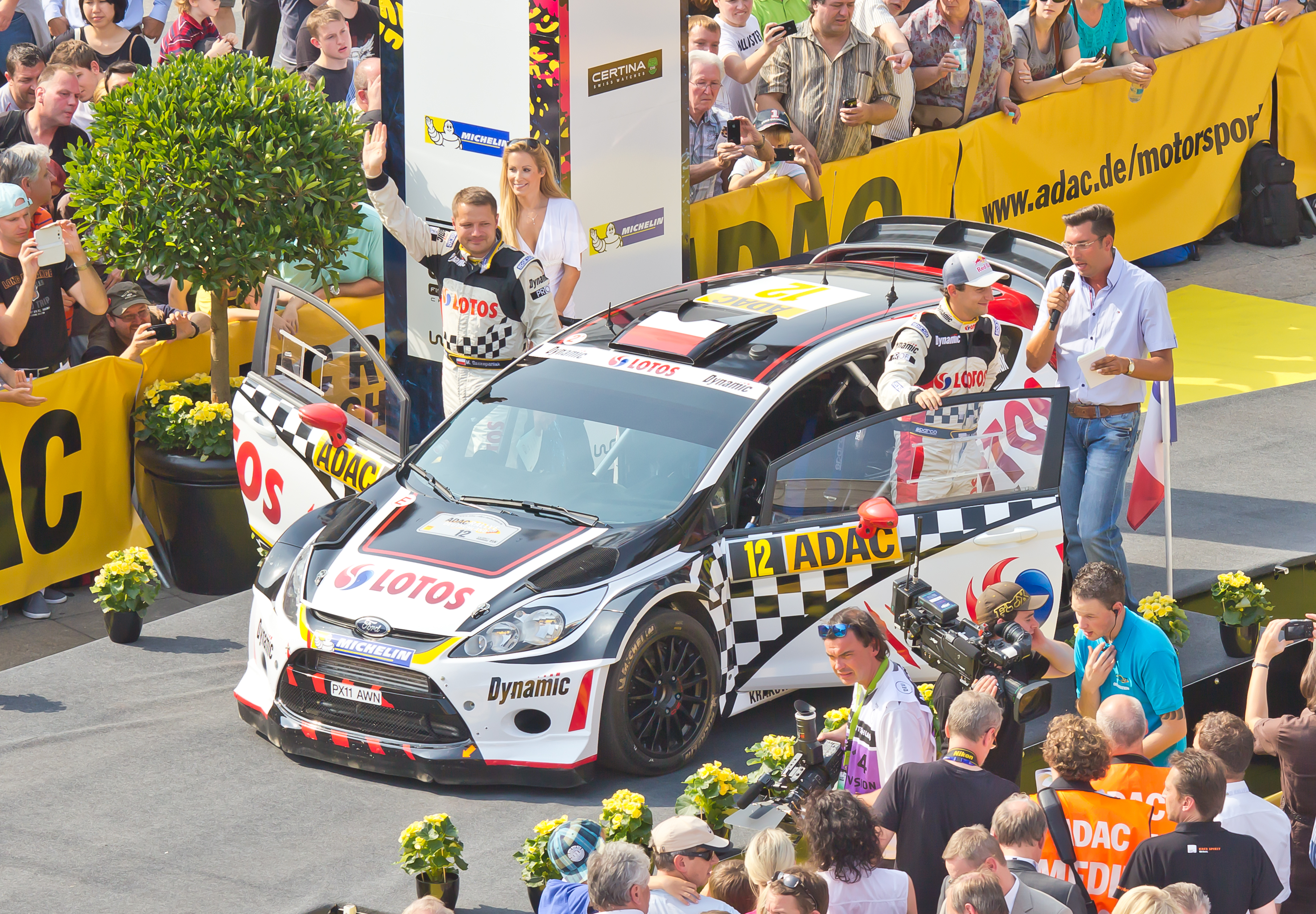
Lotos Team WRC: Michał Kościuszko and Maciej Szczepaniak in Cologne, August 2013

The team was formed by Motorsport Italia team manager Bruno di Pianto from the remains of the WRC Team Mini Portugal (which closed at the end of the 2012 season) with the support of Polish oil conglomerate Grupa Lotos. The team was scheduled to contest the 2013 season with a Mini John Cooper Works WRC driven by Polish driver and 2012 Production Car World Championship runner-up Michał Kościuszko. However, the team abandoned the Mini John Cooper Works WRC halfway through the season and withdrew their entry from the Acropolis Rally to focus on changing to the Ford Fiesta RS WRC, making their debut with the new car at the Rally d'Italia in Sardinia.

Although the team was recognised by the Fédération Internationale de l'Automobile as a manufacturer team for the 2013 season, only the team's best eight results from thirteen rallies will be counted towards the team's final points tally. Ultimately, the team only contested seven rounds of the championship; after competing in Sardinia, Kościuszko skipped Rally Finland before returning for Rallye Deutschland in what would be his final appearance during the 2013 season.

The team finished the season in eighth and last place, with twenty points and a best finish of seventh place in the Rally d'Italia.

== Complete WRC results ==
Year	Car	Driver Co-driver	Rounds													WDC	Points	WMC	Points
Year	Car	Driver Co-driver	1	2	3	4	5	6	7	8	9	10	11	12	13	WDC	Points	WMC	Points
2013	Mini John Cooper Works WRC	(Poland) Michał Kościuszko (Poland) Maciej Szczepaniak	MON; 10	SWE; 14	MEX; Ret	POR; Ret	ARG; Ret	GRE; WD								18th	7	8th	20^{1}
2013	Ford Fiesta RS WRC	(Poland) Michał Kościuszko (Poland) Maciej Szczepaniak							ITA; 7	FIN	GER; Ret	AUS	FRA	ESP	GBR	18th	7	8th	20^{1}

Notes:

- ^1 — Although the team is recognised by the FIA as a manufacturer team, only the best eight results from thirteen rallies were counted towards the team's final points tally.
