= Qatar World Rally Team =

World Rally Championship manufacturer team

- Full name: Qatar World Rally Team
- Base: (United Kingdom) Cumbria, England
- Team principal(s): Malcolm Wilson
- Drivers: (Norway) Mads Ostberg (Qatar) Nasser Al-Attiyah (Finland) Juho Hänninen (Belgium) Thierry Neuville
- Co-drivers: (Sweden) Jonas Andersson (Italy) Giovanni Bernacchini (Finland) Tomi Tuominen (Belgium) Nicolas Gilsoul
- Chassis: Citroën DS3 WRC (2012); Ford Fiesta RS WRC (2013)
- Tyres: Michelin

World Rally Championship history
- Debut: 2012 Rally Sweden
- Last event: 2013 Rally Argentina
- Manufacturers' Championships: 0
- Drivers' Championships: 0
- Rally wins: 0

The Qatar World Rally Team is a Qatari World Rally Championship team, based in Cumbria, England.

== History ==
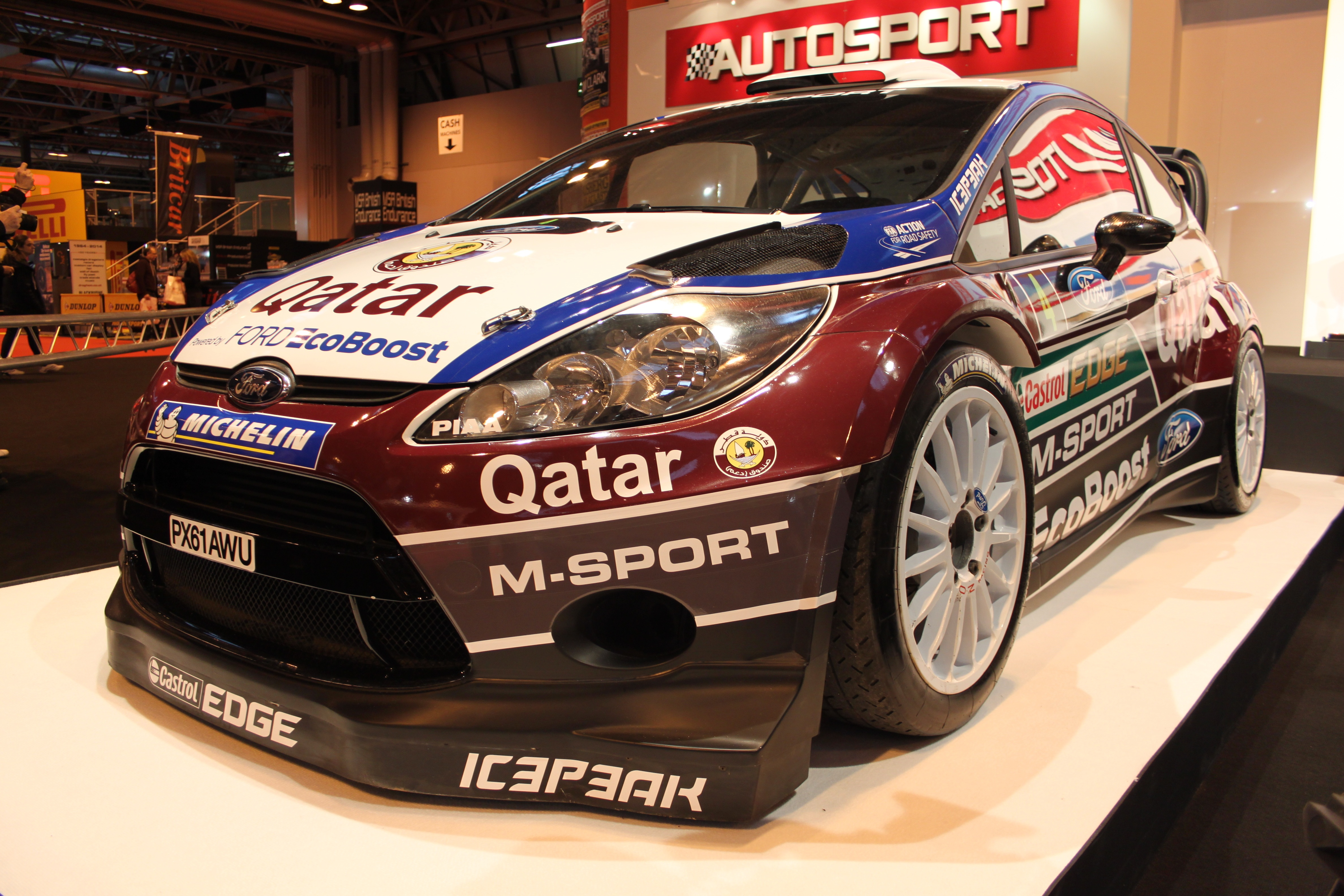
Qatar Ford Fiesta RS WRC at the 2013 Autosport Show

They made their debut at the 2012 Rally of Sweden, entering a single Citroën DS3 WRC for Nasser Al-Attiyah and co-driver Giovanni Bernacchini. Al-Attiyah was unable to contest the full season, owing to his qualification for the 2012 Summer Olympics, and the car was variously driven by Chris Atkinson in Finland, Thierry Neuville in New Zealand and Italy, and Hans Weijs, Jr. in Spain.

On 26 November 2012, British based M-Sport announced a new partnership with the State of Qatar and that Mads Østberg and Nasser Al-Attiyah would be driving Ford Fiesta RS WRCs for the 2013 season. The team expanded to include a third and a fourth car, submitting entries for Juho Hänninen and Thierry Neuville.

== WRC results ==
Year	Car	No.	Driver	1	2	3	4	5	6	7	8	9	10	11	12	13	WDC	Points	WCC	Points
2012	Citroën DS3 WRC	7	(Qatar) Nasser Al-Attiyah	MON	SWE; 21	MEX; 6	POR; 4	ARG; 9	GRE; Ret			GER; 8	GBR; 10	FRA; Ret			12th	28	6th	71
2012	Citroën DS3 WRC	7	(Belgium) Thierry Neuville							NZL; 5					ITA; 18		7th	53	6th	71
2012	Citroën DS3 WRC	7	(Australia) Chris Atkinson								FIN; 39						13th	28	6th	71
2012	Citroën DS3 WRC	7	(Netherlands) Hans Weijs													ESP; Ret	-	0	6th	71
2013	Ford Fiesta RS WRC	6	(Finland) Juho Hänninen	MON; Ret													15th	8	4th	184
2013	Ford Fiesta RS WRC	6	(United Kingdom) Matthew Wilson		SWE; 27												-	0	4th	184
2013	Ford Fiesta RS WRC	6	(Qatar) Nasser Al-Attiyah			MEX; 5	POR; 5	ARG	GRE; 5			GER; 13	AUS	FRA	ESP; Ret	GBR; WD	11th	30	4th	184
2013	Ford Fiesta RS WRC	6	(United Kingdom) Elfyn Evans							ITA; 6	FIN						-	0	4th	184
2013	Ford Fiesta RS WRC	11	(Belgium) Thierry Neuville	MON; Ret	SWE; 5	MEX; 3	POR; 17	ARG; 5	GRE; 3	ITA; 2	FIN; 2	GER; 2	AUS; 2	FRA; 4	ESP; 4	GBR; 3	2nd	176	4th	184
2013	Ford Fiesta RS WRC	15	(Finland) Juho Hänninen		SWE; 6	MEX											15th	8	4th	184
2013	Ford Fiesta RS WRC	15	(Netherlands) Dennis Kuipers	MON			POR; Ret	ARG	GRE	ITA	FIN	GER	AUS	FRA	ESP	GBR	-	0	4th	184
2013	Ford Fiesta RS WRC	23	(Argentina) Gabriel Pozzo	MON	SWE	MEX	POR	ARG; 11	GRE	ITA	FIN	GER	AUS	FRA	ESP	GBR	-	0	4th	184

== See also ==
- Ford World Rally Team
- Citroën World Rally Team
- Citroën Junior Team
