= Tomi Tuominen =

Finnish rally co-driver (born 1971)

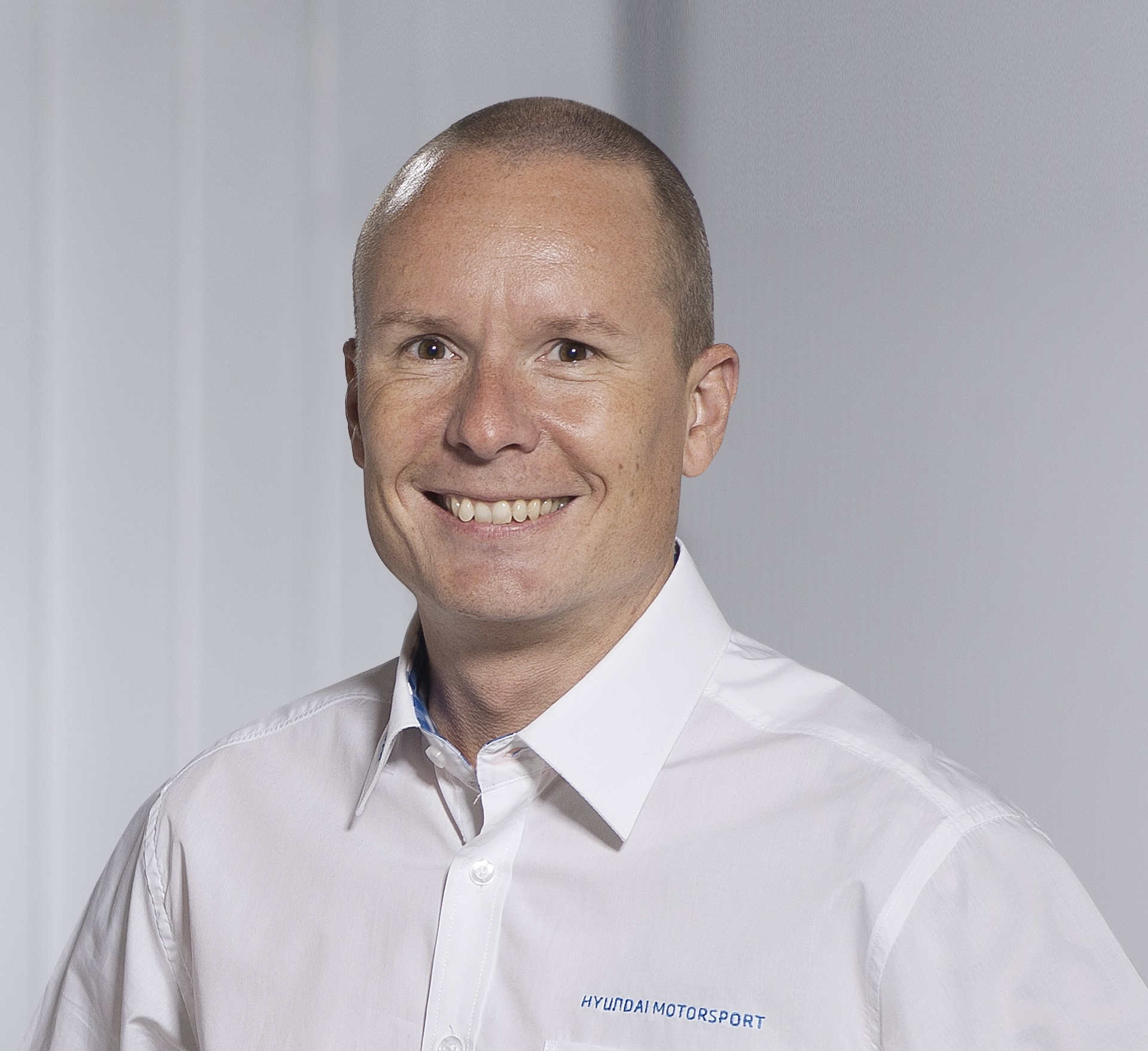
- Tomi Tuominen in 2013.

Personal information
- Nationality: (Finland) Finnish
- Born: 8 November 1971 (age 55)

World Rally Championship record
- Years active: 1999–2000, 2004–2008, 2013–2015, 2017, 2019
- Driver: (Finland) Esa Saarenpää (Finland) Jouko Puhakka (Finland) Sebastian Lindholm (Finland) Kristian Sohlberg (Finland) Toni Gardemeister (Finland) Juho Hänninen (Finland) Emil Lindholm
- Teams: Peugeot, Suzuki, Qatar, Hyundai
- Rallies: 34
- Championships: 0
- Rally wins: 0
- Podiums: 0
- First rally: 1999 Rally Finland
- Last rally: 2019 Rally Italia Sardegna

Tomi Tuominen (born 8 November 1971) is a Finnish former rally co-driver. Past drivers include Toni Gardemeister and Juho Hänninen.
