= 2013 World Rally Championship =

41st season of the World Rally Championship

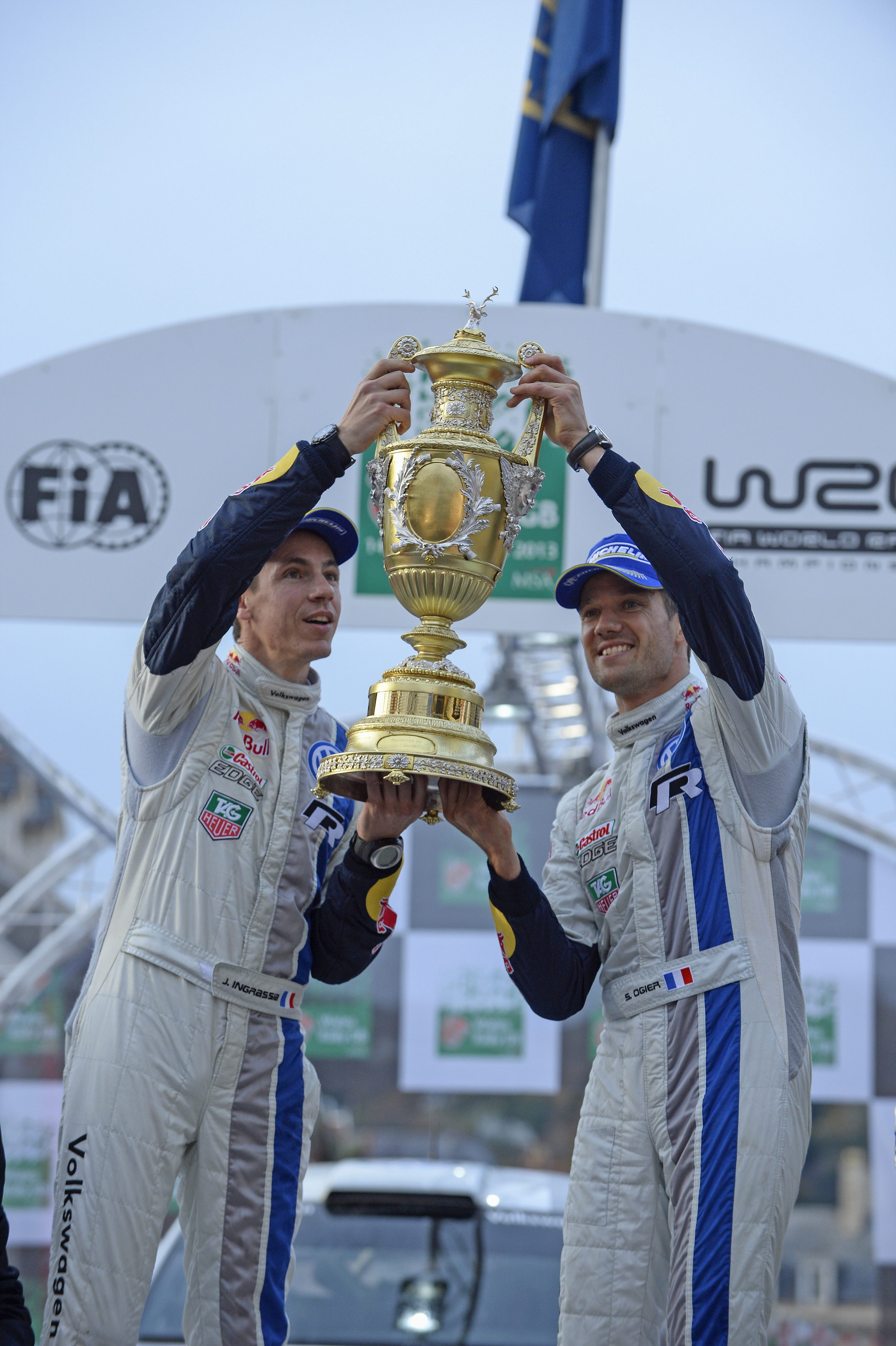
Sébastien Ogier (right) and Julien Ingrassia pictured in Wales Rally GB, won their first Drivers' Championship and Co-Drivers' Championship titles.

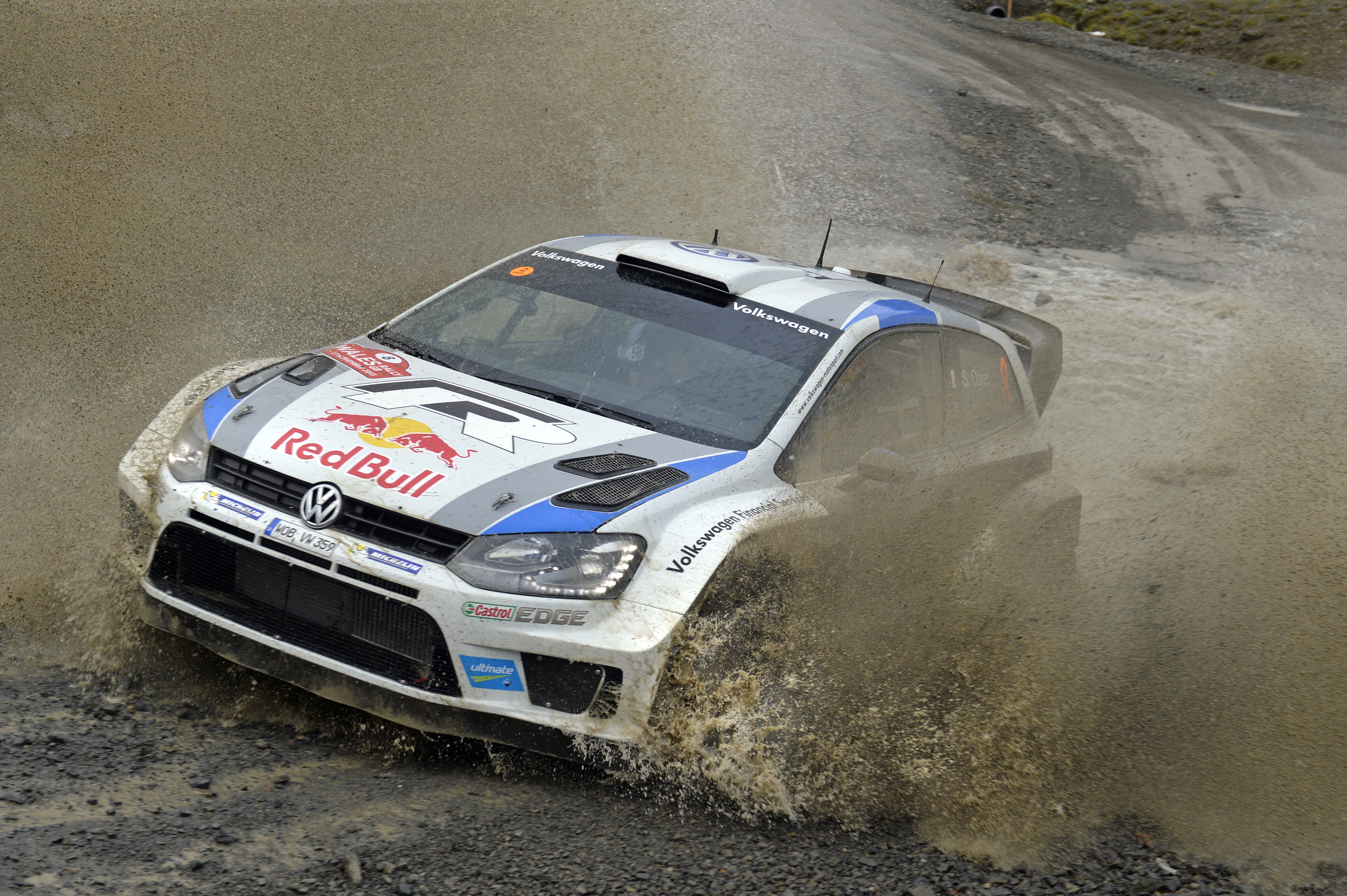
Volkswagen Polo R WRC, the car entered by the Volkswagen Motorsport, who became the World Constructors' Champions in their debuting season.

The 2013 FIA World Rally Championship was the 41st season of the World Rally Championship, a rallying championship recognised by the Fédération Internationale de l'Automobile as the highest class of international rallying. The season was run over 13 rallies, starting with the Rallye Monte Carlo on 16 January, and finishing with the Wales Rally of Great Britain on 17 November. Volkswagen entered the series as a constructor with the Polo R WRC, while Ford and Mini ended their factory support for the Fiesta RS WRC and John Cooper Works WRC respectively, though both continued to make their cars available to customer teams.

The 2013 season also marked the first appearances of the Super 2000 and Group N replacement category, Group R. As part of this introduction, the support series – Super 2000, Group N Production Cars and the World Rally Championship Academy – were restructured, with the Super 2000, four-wheel-drive Group R and Group N categories reorganised as the FIA WRC2 Championship, two-wheel-drive Group R categories becoming FIA WRC3 Championship, and the WRC Academy becoming the FIA Junior WRC Championship. An FIA Production Car Cup will also be awarded to a registered entrant in WRC-2 who is driving a Group N car.

Sébastien Loeb started the season as the defending World Champion after securing his ninth consecutive title in 2012. However, Loeb did not return to contest the full 2013 season. Citroën were the defending Constructors' Champions. Both Loeb and Citroën secured their titles at the 2012 Rallye de France Alsace.

Volkswagen Motorsport driver Sébastien Ogier won the Drivers' Championship at the Rallye de France Alsace, after Qatar World Rally Team driver Thierry Neuville failed to score maximum points on the rally-opening power stage. Neuville finished runner-up in the championship, ahead of Ogier's teammate, Jari-Matti Latvala. In the Manufacturers' Championship, Volkswagen Motorsport won the Championship at the Rally de España as Ogier and Latvala finished in the top two placings. Abu Dhabi Citroën Total World Rally Team finished second with Qatar M-Sport World Rally Team in third.

== Calendar ==
The 2013 calendar was announced at a meeting of the FIA World Motor Sport Council in Singapore on 28 September 2012. The 2013 championship was contested over thirteen rounds in Europe, the Americas and Oceania.

Round	Dates	Rally name	Base	Surface
1	16–19 January	(Monaco) Monte Carlo Rally	Valence, Rhône-Alpes	Mixed
2	7–10 February	Rally Sweden	Hagfors, Värmland	Snow
3	8–10 March	Rally Mexico	León, Guanajuato	Gravel
4	11–14 April	Rally de Portugal	Faro, Algarve	Gravel
5	3–5 May	Rally Argentina	Villa Carlos Paz, Córdoba	Gravel
6	31 May – 2 June	(Greece) Acropolis Rally	Loutraki, Corinthia	Gravel
7	21–23 June	(Italy) Rally Italia Sardegna	Olbia, Gallura	Gravel
8	1–4 August	Rally Finland	Jyväskylä, Keski-Suomi	Gravel
9	23–25 August	(Germany) Rallye Deutschland	Trier, Rhineland-Palatinate	Tarmac
10	13–15 September	Rally Australia	Coffs Harbour, New South Wales	Gravel
11	4–6 October	Rallye de France Alsace	Strasbourg, Alsace	Tarmac
12	25–27 October	(Spain) Rally Catalunya	Salou, Tarragona	Mixed
13	14–17 November	(United Kingdom) Wales Rally GB	Deeside, Flintshire	Gravel

=== Calendar and event changes ===
- The route of the Acropolis Rally was heavily revised; where the 2012 event was run over 409 km (254 mi), the 2013 rally route was cut back to just 190 km (120 mi), held over two days of competition.
- Rally Australia is scheduled to return to the calendar, replacing the Rally New Zealand as part of the event-sharing agreement established between the two events in 2008. The route for the event was adjusted from that used in 2011, with existing stages variously merged and trimmed down to make way for new stages and create a compact route that was as long as possible.
- The route of the Rallye Deutschland was changed for 2013, with the start moving from Trier to Cologne. The first leg of the event included a series of brand-new stages between the two cities that formed the first leg of the event before the competitors arrive in Trier, which served as the base for the rally.
- Rally de Catalunya, which had been the final event of 2012, was moved back to the final weekend of October to become the penultimate event of the season. The rally will feature a revised route for 2013, with the introduction of night stages and a more even split between tarmac and gravel roads than in previous years.
- The Rally Italia Sardegna was brought forward, from October to June.
- The Wales Rally GB will return to its traditional end-of-season date, having been brought forward to September for the 2012 season in a failed bid to promote tourism in the region. The event was relocated from Cardiff to Deeside in the County of Flintshire. This move enabled event organisers to introduce a brand-new route for the 2013 event, the rally run through the regions of Snowdonia and Denbighshire. More than half the stages will either be brand-new or returning after an absence of over twenty years, and will include a return to Gwydyr, a stage which has not featured in the route since the 1960s.
- The Rally Mexico featured a heavily revised route, which saw the introduction of several brand-new stages and the reconfiguration of older ones.
- The route of Rally Sweden crossed over the Norwegian border to include stages previously used in Rally Norway.

== Signed teams and drivers ==
=== World Rally Championship ===
The following teams and drivers are scheduled to compete in the World Rally Championship during the 2013 season:

World Rally Car entries eligible to score manufacturer points
Manufacturer	Car	Team	Tyre	No.	Drivers	Co-drivers	Rounds
Citroën	Citroën DS3 WRC	(France) Citroën Total Abu Dhabi World Rally Team	M	1	(France) Sébastien Loeb	(Monaco) Daniel Elena	1–2, 5, 11
Citroën	Citroën DS3 WRC	(France) Citroën Total Abu Dhabi World Rally Team	M	2	(Finland) Mikko Hirvonen	(Finland) Jarmo Lehtinen	All
Citroën	Citroën DS3 WRC	(France) Citroën Total Abu Dhabi World Rally Team	M	3	(Spain) Dani Sordo	(Spain) Carlos del Barrio	3–4, 6–9, 12–13
Citroën	Citroën DS3 WRC	(France) Citroën Total Abu Dhabi World Rally Team	M	3	(United Kingdom) Kris Meeke	(United Kingdom) Chris Patterson	10
Citroën	Citroën DS3 WRC	(France) Abu Dhabi Citroën Total World Rally Team	M	10	(Spain) Dani Sordo	(Spain) Carlos del Barrio	1, 5, 11
Citroën	Citroën DS3 WRC	(France) Abu Dhabi Citroën Total World Rally Team	M	10	(United Arab Emirates) Khalid Al Qassimi	(United Kingdom) Scott Martin	2, 4, 6–7, 9–10, 12
Citroën	Citroën DS3 WRC	(France) Abu Dhabi Citroën Total World Rally Team	M	10	(Australia) Chris Atkinson	(Belgium) Stéphane Prévot	3
Citroën	Citroën DS3 WRC	(France) Abu Dhabi Citroën Total World Rally Team	M	10	(United Kingdom) Kris Meeke	(United Kingdom) Chris Patterson	8
Citroën	Citroën DS3 WRC	(France) Abu Dhabi Citroën Total World Rally Team	M	10	(Poland) Robert Kubica	(Italy) Michele Ferrara	13
Ford	Ford Fiesta RS WRC	(United Kingdom) Qatar M-Sport World Rally Team	M	4	(Norway) Mads Østberg	(Sweden) Jonas Andersson	All
Ford	Ford Fiesta RS WRC	(United Kingdom) Qatar M-Sport World Rally Team	M	5	(Russia) Evgenij Novikov	(Austria) Ilka Minor	All
Ford	Ford Fiesta RS WRC	(United Kingdom) Qatar World Rally Team	M	6	(Finland) Juho Hänninen	(Finland) Tomi Tuominen	1
Ford	Ford Fiesta RS WRC	(United Kingdom) Qatar World Rally Team	M	6	(Qatar) Nasser Al-Attiyah	(Italy) Giovanni Bernacchini	3, 6, 9, 12
Ford	Ford Fiesta RS WRC	(United Kingdom) Qatar World Rally Team	M	11	(Belgium) Thierry Neuville	(Belgium) Nicolas Gilsoul	All
Ford	Ford Fiesta RS WRC	(United Kingdom) Lotos Team WRC	M	12	(Poland) Michał Kościuszko	(Poland) Maciek Szczepaniak	7, 9
Ford	Ford Fiesta RS WRC	(Czech Republic) Jipocar Czech National Team	D	21	(Czech Republic) Martin Prokop	(Czech Republic) Michal Ernst	2–4
Ford	Ford Fiesta RS WRC	(Czech Republic) Jipocar Czech National Team	M	21	(Czech Republic) Martin Prokop	(Czech Republic) Michal Ernst	5–9, 11–13
Volkswagen	Volkswagen Polo R WRC	(Germany) Volkswagen Motorsport	M	7	(Finland) Jari-Matti Latvala	(Finland) Miikka Anttila	All
Volkswagen	Volkswagen Polo R WRC	(Germany) Volkswagen Motorsport	M	8	(France) Sébastien Ogier	(France) Julien Ingrassia	All
Volkswagen	Volkswagen Polo R WRC	(Germany) Volkswagen Motorsport II	M	9	(Norway) Andreas Mikkelsen	(Finland) Mikko Markkula	4–7, 12–13
Volkswagen	Volkswagen Polo R WRC	(Germany) Volkswagen Motorsport II	M	9	(Norway) Andreas Mikkelsen	(Republic of Ireland) Paul Nagle	10–11
Mini	Mini John Cooper Works WRC	(Italy) Lotos Team WRC	D	12	(Poland) Michał Kościuszko	(Poland) Maciek Szczepaniak	1–5

World Rally Car entries ineligible to score manufacturer points
Manufacturer	Car	Team	Tyre	Drivers	Co-drivers	Rounds
Citroën	Citroën DS3 WRC	(France) Abu Dhabi Citroën Total World Rally Team	M	(Spain) Dani Sordo	(Spain) Carlos del Barrio	2
Citroën	Citroën DS3 WRC	(France) PH Sport	M	(France) Bryan Bouffier	(France) Xavier Panseri	1
Citroën	Citroën DS3 WRC	(France) PH Sport	M	(Mexico) Benito Guerra	(Spain) Borja Rozada	3
Citroën	Citroën DS3 WRC	(France) PH Sport	M	(Czech Republic) Tomáš Kostka	(United Kingdom) Chris Patterson	11
Ford	Ford Fiesta RS WRC	(United Kingdom) Qatar World Rally Team	M	(Finland) Juho Hänninen	(Finland) Tomi Tuominen	2
Ford	Ford Fiesta RS WRC	(United Kingdom) Qatar World Rally Team	M	(United Kingdom) Matthew Wilson	(Italy) Giovanni Bernacchini	2
Ford	Ford Fiesta RS WRC	(United Kingdom) Qatar World Rally Team	M	(Qatar) Nasser Al-Attiyah	(Italy) Giovanni Bernacchini	4
Ford	Ford Fiesta RS WRC	(United Kingdom) Qatar World Rally Team	M	(United Kingdom) Elfyn Evans	(Italy) Giovanni Bernacchini	7
Ford	Ford Fiesta RS WRC	(United Kingdom) Qatar World Rally Team	M	(Netherlands) Dennis Kuipers	(Belgium) Robin Buysmans	4
Ford	Ford Fiesta RS WRC	(United Kingdom) Qatar World Rally Team	M	(Argentina) Gabriel Pozzo	(Argentina) Daniel Stillo	5
Ford	Ford Fiesta RS WRC	(United Kingdom) Qatar M-Sport World Rally Team	M	(New Zealand) Hayden Paddon	(New Zealand) John Kennard	12
Ford	Ford Fiesta RS WRC	(United Kingdom) Qatar M-Sport World Rally Team	M	(Poland) Michał Sołowow	(United Kingdom) Chris Patterson	13
Ford	Ford Fiesta RS WRC	(United Kingdom) M-Sport	M	(Norway) Henning Solberg	(Sweden) Emil Axelsson	2
Ford	Ford Fiesta RS WRC	(United Kingdom) M-Sport	M	(Finland) Juho Hänninen	(Finland) Tomi Tuominen	8
Ford	Ford Fiesta RS WRC	(United Kingdom) M-Sport	M	(France) Romain Dumas	(France) Denis Giraudet	11
Ford	Ford Fiesta RS WRC	(Czech Republic) Jipocar Czech National Team	D	(Czech Republic) Martin Prokop	(Czech Republic) Michal Ernst	1
Ford	Ford Fiesta RS WRC	(France) Team Emap Yacco	M	(France) Julien Maurin	(France) Nicolas Klinger	1
Ford	Ford Fiesta RS WRC	(United Kingdom) Autotek Motorsport	D	(Finland) Jari Ketomaa	(Finland) Kaj Lindström	2
Ford	Ford Fiesta RS WRC	(Norway) Even Management	M	(Sweden) Pontus Tidemand	(Norway) Ola Fløene	2
Ford	Ford Fiesta RS WRC	(Norway) Even Management	M	(Sweden) Hasse Gustafsson	(Sweden) Mikael Johansson	2
Ford	Ford Fiesta RS WRC	(Ukraine) AT Rally Team	M	(Ukraine) Oleksiy Tamrazov	(Ukraine) Pavlo Cherepin	2
Ford	Ford Fiesta RS WRC	(Ukraine) AT Rally Team	M	(Sweden) Per-Gunnar Andersson	(Sweden) Emil Axelsson	7–9
Ford	Ford Fiesta RS WRC	(United States) Hoonigan Racing Division	M	(United States) Ken Block	(Italy) Alex Gelsomino	3
Ford	Ford Fiesta RS WRC	(Austria) Stohl Racing	M	(Brazil) Daniel Oliveira	(Portugal) Carlos Magalhães	5
Ford	Ford Fiesta RS WRC	(France) BDS Racing	M	(France) Lionel Baud	(France) Alex Chioso	11
Ford	Ford Fiesta RS WRC	Seashore Qatar Rally Team	M	(Qatar) Abdulaziz Al-Kuwari	(Republic of Ireland) Killian Duffy	12
Mini	Mini John Cooper Works WRC	(United Kingdom) Prodrive WRC Team	M	(Finland) Jarkko Nikara	(Finland) Jarkko Kalliolepo	2, 8
Mini	Mini John Cooper Works WRC	(Finland) ST Motors Oy	M	(Finland) Riku Tahko	(Finland) Markus Soininen	8
Mini	Mini John Cooper Works WRC	(Italy) Motorsport Italia	D	(Australia) Nathan Quinn	(Australia) Glenn MacNeall	10
Volkswagen	Volkswagen Polo R WRC	(Germany) Volkswagen Motorsport II	M	(Norway) Andreas Mikkelsen	(Finland) Mikko Markkula	8

==== Team changes ====
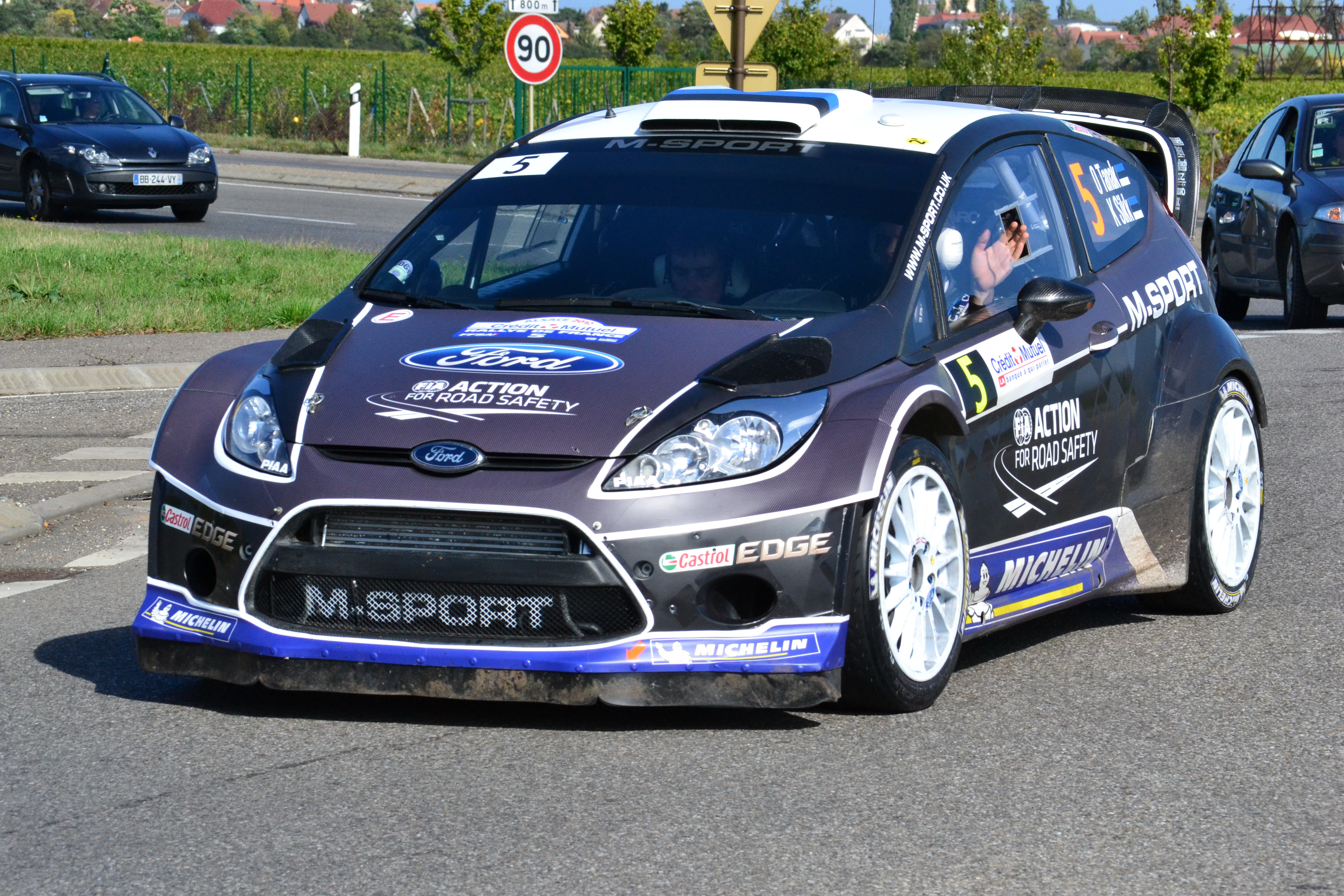

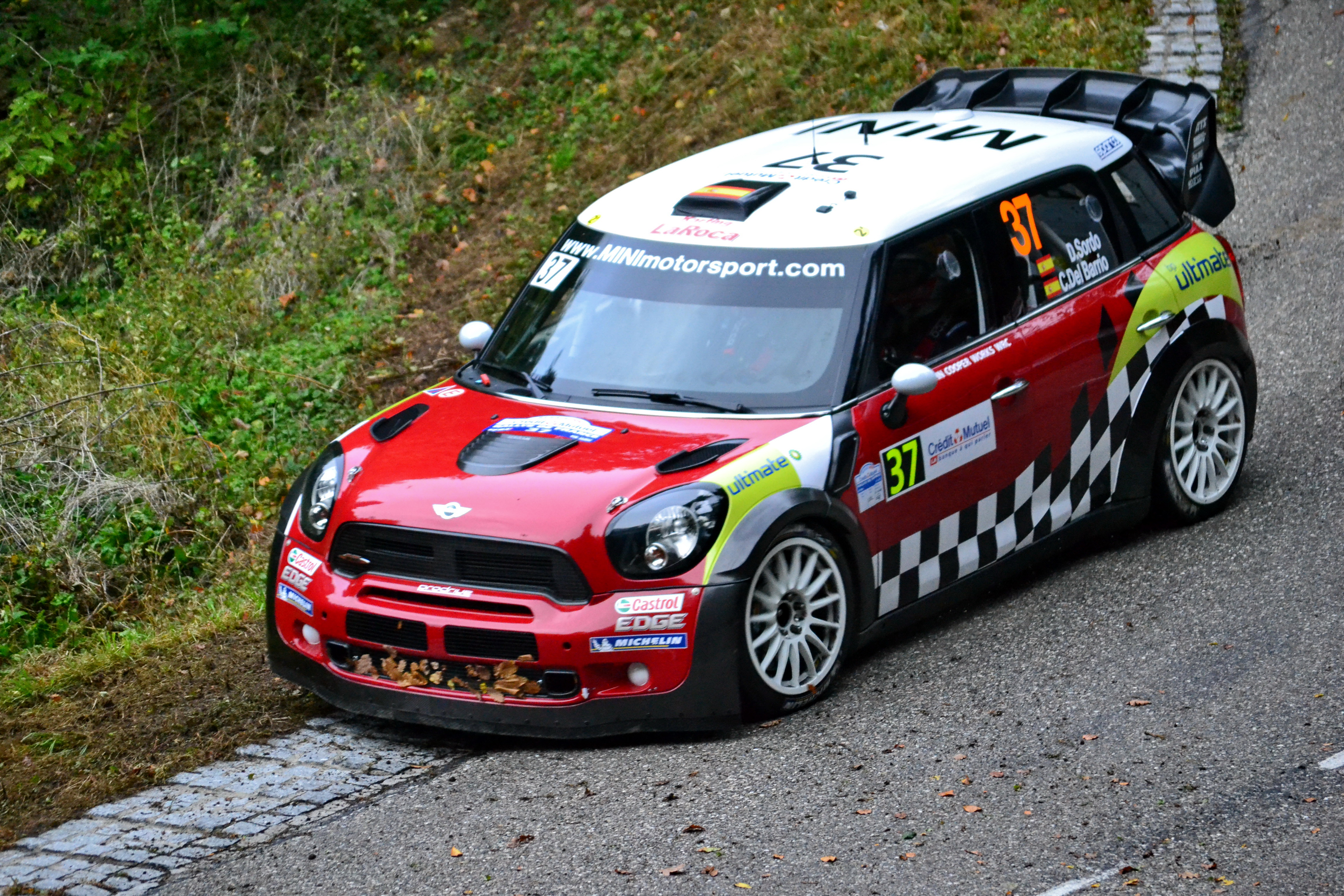
Ford and Mini have ended their support programmes for the Fiesta RS (top) and John Cooper Works (bottom) WRC cars.

- Citroën will expand its works team, the Citroën Total Abu Dhabi World Rally Team, to become a three-car operation, with the team's third car to be run part-time. The Abu Dhabi Citroën Total World Rally Team will run two additional cars as a satellite team of the works outfit which is eligible to score manufacturers' points independently of the works team.
- Ford will no longer provide manufacturer support to its teams in 2013. The M-Sport Ford World Rally Team will still operate as a WRC team and be eligible to score World Championship points, with the team having acquired backing from Qatar to run three cars. Like Citroën, M-Sport's entries were structured into two teams that are able to score points independently of one another; in the absence of a Ford factory team, the Qatar M-Sport World Rally Team became the de facto lead team, and the Qatar World Rally Team was set up as a satellite operation.
- Hyundai will return to the series in 2014 as a manufacturer after an eleven-year absence. The company has announced plans to compete with the i20 WRC at selected events in 2013, ahead of a full championship campaign in 2014. Hyundai had previously competed in the WRC from 2000 to 2003 with the Accent WRC.
- In October 2012, Mini formally terminated their factory-supported WRC programme, but stated that as the John Cooper Works WRC had met the FIA's homologation requirements for World Rally Cars, they would make the car available to customer teams who wished to compete with it. Prodrive announced their intentions to continue campaigning with cars, but Team Mini Portugal, Palmeirinha Rally and the Armindo Araújo World Rally Team were closed down.
- Following the closure of Team Mini Portugal, several members of Motorsport Italia—the organisation that prepared and managed the Team Mini Portugal entries in 2012—formed a new team with the backing of Polish oil conglomerate Grupa Lotos, to be known as Lotos Team WRC. The team later switched to competing with a Ford Fiesta RS WRC.
- Volkswagen will enter the championship as a manufacturer team, entering two Polo R WRCs for a full-season campaign – to be headed by Sébastien Ogier and co-driver Julien Ingrassia – who contested the 2012 season with a Škoda Fabia S2000.

==== Driver changes ====
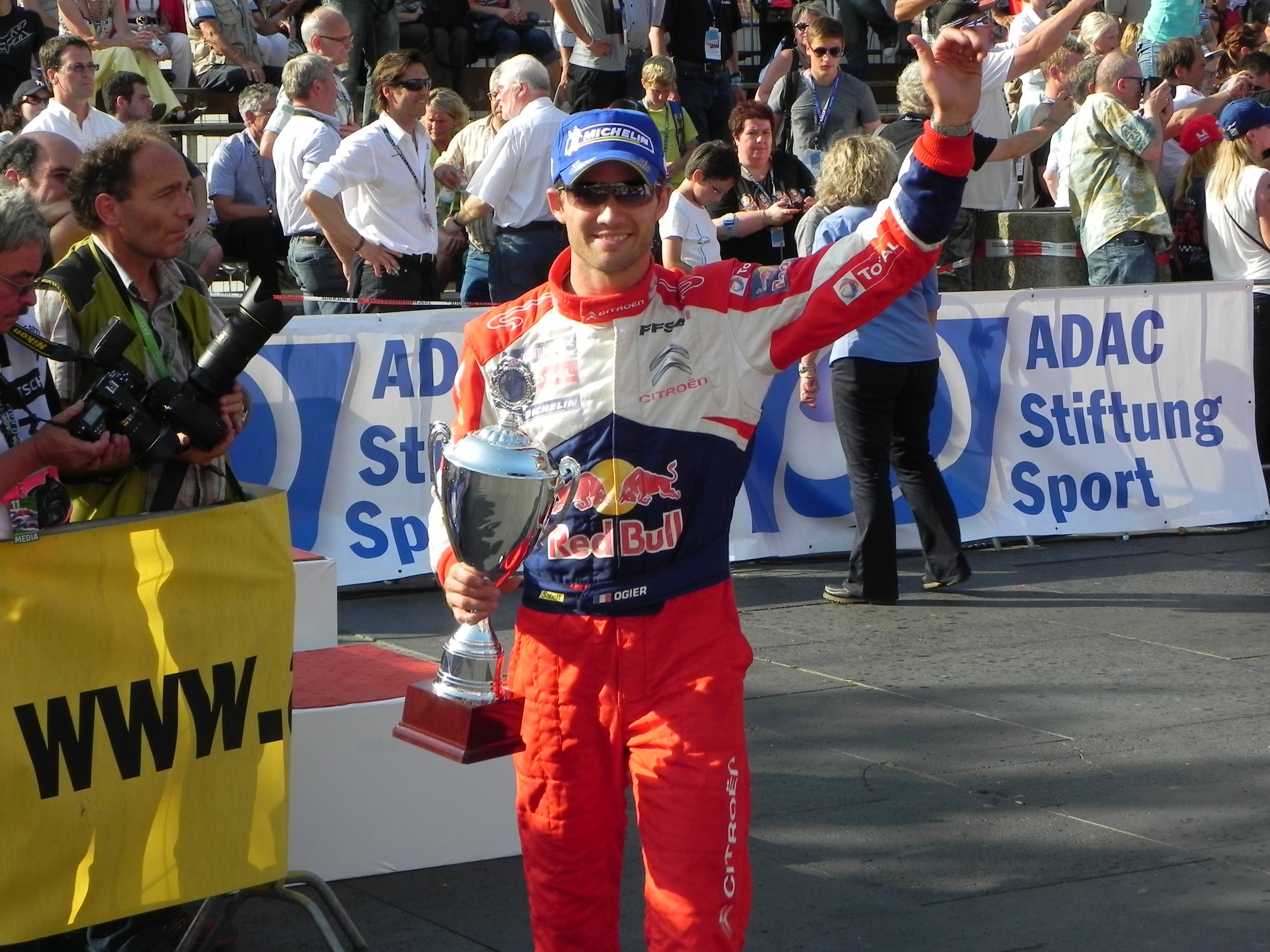
Sébastien Ogier – seen here at the 2011 Rallye Deutschland – will lead Volkswagen's foray into the World Rally Championship.

- Chris Atkinson, who made several guest appearances with a variety of teams in 2012, will drive for the Abu Dhabi Citroën team at events where Dani Sordo will drive for sister team Citroën Abu Dhabi.
- Nasser Al-Attiyah, who contested the 2012 season with Citroën will switch to Ford for 2013, driving for Qatar M-Sport, where he will compete in selected events on the 2013 calendar.
- Khalid Al Qassimi will return to the World Rally Championship in 2013, after spending 2012 on sabbatical. Having spent most of his competitive career at the WRC level driving for Ford, Al Qassimi will switch to Citroën for the 2013 season, driving a DS3 prepared by Citroën Racing.
- Bryan Bouffier, who won the 2011 Rallye Monte Carlo, will make his debut in a WRC-spec car at the Rallye Monte Carlo driving a privately entered Citroën DS3 WRC.
- 2012 Production Car Champion Benito Guerra will make his debut in a WRC-spec car at the Rally Sweden.
- Juho Hänninen will return to the WRC after a four-year absence, driving a Ford Fiesta prepared by M-Sport at selected events on the 2013 calendar. In the time since his last appearance at the WRC level in 2007, Hänninen won the 2010 Intercontinental Rally Challenge, 2011 Super 2000 World Rally Championship and 2012 European Rally Championship titles.
- Michał Kościuszko will make his World Rally Car debut, driving a Mini John Cooper Works WRC prepared by Italian entrant Lotos Team WRC. Kościuszko later moved to M-Sport.
- Jari-Matti Latvala will partner Sébastien Ogier driving for Volkswagen. Latvala described Ford's decision to end its works programme as the key factor that influenced his decision to change teams.
- At the 2012 Paris Motor Show, nine-time World Champion Sébastien Loeb announced that he would only compete at selected events during the 2013 season, confirming his entry in the Rallye Monte Carlo, but revealing that he had "no fixed plans" for the remainder of the season. At Citroën's formal team launch, Loeb confirmed that his programme for the 2013 season would consist of just four events, and later announced that he would venture out into other motorsport categories, including the FIA GT Series and the Pikes Peak International Hill Climb.
- Andreas Mikkelsen will compete part-time in a Volkswagen Polo R WRC, joining the championship at the Rally of Portugal.
- Thierry Neuville will move from Citroën's junior team to Qatar M-Sport. Prior to his move to M-Sport, Citroën had planned to offer Neuville a place in their factory team, driving in Sébastien Loeb's place at the nine rounds Loeb will not appear at in 2013.
- Evgenij Novikov was promoted from M-Sport's satellite team to the de facto manufacturer team.
- Mads Østberg will leave the Adapta World Rally Team to join Qatar M-Sport.
- Henning Solberg will return to the WRC with a privately entered Ford Fiesta after missing most of the 2012 season when his team, the Go Fast Energy World Rally Team withdrew after two rounds.
- Petter Solberg, the 2003 World Drivers' Champion, announced that he would not participate in the 2013 season after he was unable to secure a drive.
- Dani Sordo will return to Citroën World Rally Team after two years developing the Mini John Cooper Works WRC with the Prodrive WRC Team. Sordo will be nominated to score manufacturer points in events where Sébastien Loeb is not competing.
- Ott Tänak lost his seat with M-Sport.
- Matthew Wilson will return to the World Rally Championship, making a guest appearance at the Rally Sweden after Nasser Al-Attiyah fell ill before the event. Wilson last competed in the 2012 Wales Rally GB, after being forced to miss most of the 2012 season due to injury.

== Changes ==
=== Class changes ===
The 2013 season will see the introduction of a new rally category, Group R. No new cars will be homologated under the Group A and Group N regulations for production cars, and will instead be reclassified under Group R before being phased out of competition. With the introduction of Group R, the rules for the feeder categories re-written in a bid to boost entries:

- In the WRC Championship, entries registered as manufacturers must enter all thirteen rounds of the championship with a minimum of two cars. These teams may score drivers' and manufacturers' championship points at every round they enter.
- Major entries that are registered as WRC teams but not as manufacturers must take part in at least seven events – including at least one outside Europe – with a one or two-car team. These teams are eligible to score manufacturers' points if the cars entered meet the homologation of those cars that are entered by teams registered as manufacturers.
- In the WRC-2 Championship – open to R5, R4, Super 2000 and N4 cars – teams must contest at least seven events, with their best six results from the first seven events they enter being counted towards their final points tally. There will be no penalty for missing rounds.
- In the WRC-3 Championship – open to two-wheel-drive cars conforming to the FIA's R1, R2 and R3 technical regulations – teams must contest at least six events, with their best five results from the first seven events they enter being counted towards their final points tally. There will be no penalty for missing rounds.
- The Junior WRC Championship will be open to drivers under the age of twenty-six. All teams will contest the same six events—the Rallies of Portugal, Greece, Finland, Germany, France and Catalunya—with their five best results counting towards their final score.

=== Organisational structure ===
After the collapse of promoter North One Sport and parent company Convers Sports Initiatives in early 2012, and being forced to arrange event coverage on an event-by-event basis for most of the 2012 season, the World Rally Championship sought out a new promoter for 2013 in Red Bull House Media.

At the end of the 2012 season, the FIA elected not to renew their contract with British firm Stage One Technology to provide timing services for stages. They were replaced by Spanish outfit Sistemas Integrales de Telecomunicacion.

== Rally summaries ==
=== Round 1 — Monte Carlo Rally ===
Round	Rally name	Podium finishers					Statistics			
Round	Rally name	Pos.	No.	Driver	Team	Time	Stages	Length	Starters	Finishers
1	(Monaco) Monte Carlo Rally (15–20 January) — Results and report	1	1	(France) Sébastien Loeb (Monaco) Daniel Elena	(France) Citroën Total Abu Dhabi WRT (Citroën DS3 WRC)	5:18:57.2	(18)^{†} 16	(478.42 km)^{†} 436.02 km	73	45
1	(Monaco) Monte Carlo Rally (15–20 January) — Results and report	2	8	(France) Sébastien Ogier (France) Julien Ingrassia	(Germany) Volkswagen Motorsport (Volkswagen Polo R WRC)	5:20:37.1	(18)^{†} 16	(478.42 km)^{†} 436.02 km	73	45
1	(Monaco) Monte Carlo Rally (15–20 January) — Results and report	3	10	(Spain) Dani Sordo (Spain) Carlos del Barrio	(France) Abu Dhabi Citroën Total WRT (Citroën DS3 WRC)	5:22:46.2	(18)^{†} 16	(478.42 km)^{†} 436.02 km	73	45

The opening event of the season was run in difficult conditions, with heavy snowfalls recorded the length of the route. In his final appearance at the Monte Carlo Rally, Sébastien Loeb secured a record seventh victory on the event, winning by over a minute and a half. The World Champion took the lead during the first day and quickly established a one-minute margin to his former teammate, Sébastien Ogier. Ogier went on to finish second in the Volkswagen Polo R WRC's debut, having set the fastest time on the opening stage of the rally. Teammate Jari-Matti Latvala was less-fortunate, sliding off the road on the fourth leg of the rally and retiring. Despite beating Loeb's times on several stages, Ogier was quoted as saying he had no intention of challenging Loeb's lead as it was "never a part of the plan", whilst team principal Jost Capito stated that it was more important for the team to secure a strong result than it was to challenge for outright victory. Nevertheless, some observers admitted that Loeb was untouchable, regardless Ogier's motivation. Dani Sordo secured third place after spending most of the rally trading place with Qatar M-Sport's Evgeny Novikov until the Russian crashed out of the event on the Col de Turini. The event was ultimately cut short when rally organisers cancelled the final two stages in the face of overwhelming spectator numbers that blocked access to the stages. As a result, no points were offered for the Power stage.

=== Round 2 — Rally Sweden ===
Round	Rally name	Podium finishers					Statistics			
Round	Rally name	Pos.	No.	Driver	Team	Time	Stages	Length	Starters	Finishers
2	Rally Sweden (8–10 February) — Results and report	1	8	(France) Sébastien Ogier (France) Julien Ingrassia	(Germany) Volkswagen Motorsport (Volkswagen Polo R WRC)	3:11:41.9	22	297.78 km	43	35
2	Rally Sweden (8–10 February) — Results and report	2	1	(France) Sébastien Loeb (Monaco) Daniel Elena	(France) Citroën Total Abu Dhabi WRT (Citroën DS3 WRC)	3:12:23.7	22	297.78 km	43	35
2	Rally Sweden (8–10 February) — Results and report	3	4	(Norway) Mads Østberg (Sweden) Jonas Andersson	(United Kingdom) Qatar M-Sport WRT (Ford Fiesta RS WRC)	3:13:06.4	22	297.78 km	43	35

Sébastien Ogier secured the Volkswagen Polo R WRC's maiden victory in Sweden, winning the rally by forty seconds ahead of Sébastien Loeb. Ogier took the lead of the rally early on the first day, and steadily built up a thirty-second lead over the rest of the field. After struggling with a poor set-up early in the rally, Sébastien Loeb steadily began to recover, and eventually launched a final assault as the rally crossed over the border into Norway. Loeb successfully took ten seconds away from Ogier as he won three consecutive stages until made a mistake on the penultimate stage and hit a snowbank, at which point he decided to back off. Ogier and teammate Jari-Matti Latvala went on to set the two fastest times on the Power Stage, with the three bonus World Championship points giving Ogier the lead in World Drivers' Championship. Mads Østberg completed the podium, narrowly beating Latvala. Mikko Hirvonen lost twenty minutes in an accident on the first day and ultimately went on to finish seventeenth, whilst Evgeny Novikov rolled on the final day and fell from fifth to ninth overall.

=== Round 3 — Rally Mexico ===
Round	Rally name	Podium finishers					Statistics			
Round	Rally name	Pos.	No.	Driver	Team	Time	Stages	Length	Starters	Finishers
3	Rally Mexico (8–10 March) — Results and report	1	8	(France) Sébastien Ogier (France) Julien Ingrassia	(Germany) Volkswagen Motorsport (Volkswagen Polo R WRC)	4:30:31.2	23	396.82 km	25	20
3	Rally Mexico (8–10 March) — Results and report	2	2	(Finland) Mikko Hirvonen (Finland) Jarmo Lehtinen	(France) Citroën Total Abu Dhabi WRT (Citroën DS3 WRC)	4:33:58.0	23	396.82 km	25	20
3	Rally Mexico (8–10 March) — Results and report	3	11	(Belgium) Thierry Neuville (Belgium) Nicolas Gilsoul	(United Kingdom) Qatar World Rally Team (Ford Fiesta RS WRC)	4:34:50.8	23	396.82 km	25	20

With Sébastien Loeb contesting just four events in 2013, the Rally of Mexico became the first rally since the 1992 Rallye Côte d'Ivoire to start without a World Champion driver taking part. The first leg of the rally was marked by a three-way battle, with Thierry Neuville, Sébastien Ogier and Mads Østberg all holding the lead of the rally. As Ogier gradually established a lead over Østberg as Neuville fell behind until a mechanical issue forced Østberg into a premature retirement. Østberg was able to re-enter the rally the next day under "Rally 2" regulations, but the accompanying five-minute penalty put him out of contention and Mikko Hirvonen emerged as Ogier's closest challenger; Østberg ultimately finished eleventh, but scored two bonus world championship points on the Power Stage. Ogier went on to win his second rally in succession by three and a half minutes, with Hirvonen second and Neuville completing the podium. Dani Sordo—driving for the Citroën works team in Loeb's absence—was fourth, while Nasser al-Attiyah, Chris Atkinson and Ken Block all marked their return to the WRC with fifth, sixth and seventh place respectively.

=== Round 4 — Rally de Portugal ===
Round	Rally name	Podium finishers					Statistics			
Round	Rally name	Pos.	No.	Driver	Team	Time	Stages	Length	Starters	Finishers
4	Rally de Portugal (11–14 April) — Results and report	1	8	(France) Sébastien Ogier (France) Julien Ingrassia	(Germany) Volkswagen Motorsport (Volkswagen Polo R WRC)	4:07:38.7	15	386.73 km	70	38
4	Rally de Portugal (11–14 April) — Results and report	2	2	(Finland) Mikko Hirvonen (Finland) Jarmo Lehtinen	(France) Citroën Total Abu Dhabi WRT (Citroën DS3 WRC)	4:08:36.9	15	386.73 km	70	38
4	Rally de Portugal (11–14 April) — Results and report	3	7	(Finland) Jari-Matti Latvala (Finland) Miikka Anttila	(Germany) Volkswagen Motorsport (Volkswagen Polo R WRC)	4:11:43.2	15	386.73 km	70	38

Sébastien Ogier took his third consecutive win in Portugal. Mads Østberg took an early lead, but rolled his Ford Fiesta RS WRC when he mis-heard a pace note on the first day, and he was forced to retire. Dani Sordo emerged as Ogier's next challenger, but his bid to win the rally came to an abrupt end when he was similarly forced to retire after crashing. Ogier and teammate Jari-Matti Latvala built up a lead over third-placed Mikko Hirvonen until disaster struck the two Volkswagen Polo R WRCs on the final day. Ogier lost thirty seconds on a single stage with a mechanical problem, whilst the same fate befell Latvala, who subsequently lost second place to Hirvonen. The Volkswagens recovered quickly, and Ogier went on to win the power stage and the rally, but the damage had been done and Latvala finished three minutes behind Hirvonen. Evgeny Novikov recovered from a slow start to his season to finish fourth, the highest-placed Ford driver, with Nasser Al-Attiyah in fifth and Andreas Mikkelsen sixth in the third Volkswagen. Østberg re-entered the rally after his roll and went on to finish eighth, picking up two extra World Championship points on the power stage.

=== Round 5 — Rally Argentina ===
Round	Rally name	Podium finishers					Statistics			
Round	Rally name	Pos.	No.	Driver	Team	Time	Stages	Length	Starters	Finishers
5	Rally Argentina (3–5 May) — Results and report	1	1	(France) Sébastien Loeb (Monaco) Daniel Elena	(France) Citroën Total Abu Dhabi WRT (Citroën DS3 WRC)	4:35:56.7	14	407.64 km	32	24
5	Rally Argentina (3–5 May) — Results and report	2	8	(France) Sébastien Ogier (France) Julien Ingrassia	(Germany) Volkswagen Motorsport (Volkswagen Polo R WRC)	4:36:51.7	14	407.64 km	32	24
5	Rally Argentina (3–5 May) — Results and report	3	7	(Finland) Jari-Matti Latvala (Finland) Miikka Anttila	(Germany) Volkswagen Motorsport (Volkswagen Polo R WRC)	4:37:57.5	14	407.64 km	32	24

After missing the rallies of Mexico and Portugal to compete in the FIA Grand Touring Series, Sébastien Loeb marked his return to rallying with first place in the Rally Argentina. Sébastien Ogier took the lead early on, but made a mistake whilst driving in heavy fog. He lost forty seconds, allowing Loeb to seize the advantage. Jari-Matti Latvala and Mikko Hirvonen fought over the final podium position until Hirvonen's Citroën DS3 WRC developed an electrical problem. Latvala could not afford to rest, as he found himself fighting with Evgeny Novikov. A late charge on the final day—including the fastest time on the power stage—was enough for Latvala to secure third place and his first podium in Argentina. Hirvonen recovered to finish sixth overall, finishing third on the power stage to score an additional World Championship point.

=== Round 6 — Acropolis Rally ===
Round	Rally name	Podium finishers					Statistics			
Round	Rally name	Pos.	No.	Driver	Team	Time	Stages	Length	Starters	Finishers
6	(Greece) Acropolis Rally (31 May – 2 June) — Results and report	1	7	(Finland) Jari-Matti Latvala (Finland) Miikka Anttila	(Germany) Volkswagen Motorsport (Volkswagen Polo R WRC)	3:31:01.2	14	306.53 km	49	38
6	(Greece) Acropolis Rally (31 May – 2 June) — Results and report	2	3	(Spain) Dani Sordo (Spain) Carlos del Barrio	(France) Citroën Total Abu Dhabi WRT (Citroën DS3 WRC)	3:32:51.2	14	306.53 km	49	38
6	(Greece) Acropolis Rally (31 May – 2 June) — Results and report	3	11	(Belgium) Thierry Neuville (Belgium) Nicolas Gilsoul	(United Kingdom) Qatar World Rally Team (Ford Fiesta RS WRC)	3:33:15.3	14	306.53 km	49	38

Jari-Matti Latvala took his first win of the 2013 season, and his first win for Volkswagen on the Acropolis Rally. The opening forty-seven kilometre stage proved to be difficult, claiming three high-profile victims in Sébastien Ogier, Mads Østberg and Mikko Hirvonen in short order, and Evgeny Novikov emerged as the surprise early leader, building up a thirty-second advantage at the end of the first leg. The Russian's lead was short-lived, as he developed a puncture early in the second leg and was forced to limp back to the service park. Latvala took control of the rally while Andreas Mikkelsen in the third factory-supported Polo R began to work his way up through the points-paying positions. He ultimately missed out on a podium finish of his own, as Dani Sordo and Thierry Neuville each took their second podium finish of the season with second and third place respectively. Latvala's result was briefly challenged by Citroën, who believed his car was in violation of the technical regulations, but the protest was dismissed and Latvala's result was confirmed, allowing him to secure second place in the drivers' championship standings behind teammate Ogier.

=== Round 7 — Rally Italia Sardegna ===
Round	Rally name	Podium finishers					Statistics			
Round	Rally name	Pos.	No.	Driver	Team	Time	Stages	Length	Starters	Finishers
7	(Italy) Rally Italia Sardegna (21–23 June) — Results and report	1	8	(France) Sébastien Ogier (France) Julien Ingrassia	(Germany) Volkswagen Motorsport (Volkswagen Polo R WRC)	3:22:57.9	23	304.21 km	56	41
7	(Italy) Rally Italia Sardegna (21–23 June) — Results and report	2	11	(Belgium) Thierry Neuville (Belgium) Nicolas Gilsoul	(United Kingdom) Qatar World Rally Team (Ford Fiesta RS WRC)	3:24:14.7	23	304.21 km	56	41
7	(Italy) Rally Italia Sardegna (21–23 June) — Results and report	3	7	(Finland) Jari-Matti Latvala (Finland) Miikka Anttila	(Germany) Volkswagen Motorsport (Volkswagen Polo R WRC)	3:24:45.9	23	304.21 km	56	41

Sébastien Ogier held the lead of the rally from start to finish; with three stage wins on the first day, Ogier held a lead of 46.6 seconds over Mikko Hirvonen, who battled for second with Thierry Neuville, with a difference of only 3.1 seconds at the end of the day. Both Qatar M-Sport World Rally Team drivers, Mads Østberg and Evgeny Novikov retired. On the second day, Hirvonen started with a stage win, but on the next stage went wide and got stuck into a ditch, leaving second place to Neuville. Ogier's teammate, Jari-Matti Latvala recovered from 12th position after a puncture on stage one, to finish third. Dani Sordo was the best Citroën finisher in fourth, ahead of Martin Prokop in fifth, while Elfyn Evans finished sixth on his début in a World Rally Car. Michał Kościuszko got his best result of the year in seventh, ahead of Østberg – recovering from his accident – to finish eighth via Rally-2. Robert Kubica got his first championship points by finishing ninth and Khalid Al Qassimi completed the top ten finishers.

=== Round 8 — Rally Finland ===
Round	Rally name	Podium finishers					Statistics			
Round	Rally name	Pos.	No.	Driver	Team	Time	Stages	Length	Starters	Finishers
8	Rally Finland (2–4 August) — Results and report	1	8	(France) Sébastien Ogier (France) Julien Ingrassia	(Germany) Volkswagen Motorsport (Volkswagen Polo R WRC)	2:43:10.4	23	324.21 km	97	70
8	Rally Finland (2–4 August) — Results and report	2	11	(Belgium) Thierry Neuville (Belgium) Nicolas Gilsoul	(United Kingdom) Qatar World Rally Team (Ford Fiesta RS WRC)	2:43:47.0	23	324.21 km	97	70
8	Rally Finland (2–4 August) — Results and report	3	4	(Norway) Mads Østberg (Sweden) Jonas Andersson	(United Kingdom) Qatar M-Sport WRT (Ford Fiesta RS WRC)	2:44:08.0	23	324.21 km	97	70

Sébastien Ogier won the rally to become the fifth non-Scandinavian driver to win the rally. Rally Finland started with a four-way fight between Volkswagen Motorsport's Ogier, Citroën Total Abu Dhabi WRT's Mikko Hirvonen, Qatar M-Sport WRT's Mads Østberg and Qatar World Rally Team's Thierry Neuville. Ogier won the first stage, but Neuville won the second one to become the leader jointly with Hirvonen. Ogier set the fastest time for the third stage, and joined Neuville at the front. Hirvonen fought back on the very next stage, and returned to the joint lead with Neuville. The next stage saw heavy rain and a complicated Hirvonen lost sixteen seconds to be back in the fight. Østberg won the stage, but Neuville became the outright leader. Jari-Matti Latvala hit a rock on the second stage and had to retire for the day. The second day started with a swap of the leading position between M-Sport's Neuville and Østberg. But on the second loop, both hit trouble and Ogier become the leader by over 30 seconds. Kris Meeke lost nearly 25 seconds behind Evgeny Novikov, but Meeke was attributed his afternoon time for both passes through the stage, and finished the day in fifth. The final day saw the podium finishers remain as the previous evening, after second placed Neuville won the battle with Østberg, when the latter went off to avoid a rock. Hirvonen finished fourth, with teammate Dani Sordo finishing fifth after Meeke rolled his Citroën DS3 WRC. Novikov recovered to finish sixth, with local Jari Ketomaa in seventh in his Ford Fiesta R5. The top ten finishers were completed by Per-Gunnar Andersson, Robert Kubica – scoring again with the Citroën DS3 RRC – and Andreas Mikkelsen.

=== Round 9 — Rallye Deutschland ===
Round	Rally name	Podium finishers					Statistics			
Round	Rally name	Pos.	No.	Driver	Team	Time	Stages	Length	Starters	Finishers
9	(Germany) Rallye Deutschland (23–25 August) — Results and report	1	3	(Spain) Dani Sordo (Spain) Carlos del Barrio	(France) Citroën Total Abu Dhabi WRT (Citroën DS3 WRC)	3:15:19.4	(16)^{†} 15	(371.86 km)^{†} 330.78 km	76	52
9	(Germany) Rallye Deutschland (23–25 August) — Results and report	2	11	(Belgium) Thierry Neuville (Belgium) Nicolas Gilsoul	(United Kingdom) Qatar World Rally Team (Ford Fiesta RS WRC)	3:16:12.4	(16)^{†} 15	(371.86 km)^{†} 330.78 km	76	52
9	(Germany) Rallye Deutschland (23–25 August) — Results and report	3	2	(Finland) Mikko Hirvonen (Finland) Jarmo Lehtinen	(France) Citroën Total Abu Dhabi WRT (Citroën DS3 WRC)	3:17:55.5	(16)^{†} 15	(371.86 km)^{†} 330.78 km	76	52

Dani Sordo won his first ever WRC event at the all-tarmac Rallye Deutschland after fighting back from fourth place. The first day finished with Volkswagen Motorsport's Sébastien Ogier and Jari-Matti Latvala in first and second, with Thierry Neuville in third. The second day of competition started with leader Ogier off the road after missing a braking point. This handed the lead to teammate Latvala, who fought to maintain this position from Neuville. Neuville won the first three stages of the day, but Latvala went on to win three stages from the second loop. Latvala lost the lead after an accident on stage 12, on a stage where Neuville and Mads Østberg also went off the road. Neuville took the lead, but lost it on the next stage to Citroën Total Abu Dhabi WRT's Sordo. Day 3 finished with Sordo leading by only 0.8 seconds. In the final day of competition, Sordo retained the lead after Neuville went off in the very last stage and settled with second position and Mikko Hirvonen completed the podium. Martin Prokop and WRC-2 frontrunners Robert Kubica and Elfyn Evans got their best results with fourth, fifth and sixth respectively. Latvala went on to finish seventh, with Hayden Paddon in eighth with a Škoda Fabia S2000. Teammates Østberg and Evgeny Novikov completed the top ten finishers.

=== Round 10 — Rally Australia ===
Round	Rally name	Podium finishers					Statistics			
Round	Rally name	Pos.	No.	Driver	Team	Time	Stages	Length	Starters	Finishers
10	Rally Australia (13–15 September) — Results and report	1	8	(France) Sébastien Ogier (France) Julien Ingrassia	(Germany) Volkswagen Motorsport (Volkswagen Polo R WRC)	3:19:55.0	23	396.82 km (246.57 mi)	29	23
10	Rally Australia (13–15 September) — Results and report	2	11	(Belgium) Thierry Neuville (Belgium) Nicolas Gilsoul	(United Kingdom) Qatar World Rally Team (Ford Fiesta RS WRC)	3:21:27.1	23	396.82 km (246.57 mi)	29	23
10	Rally Australia (13–15 September) — Results and report	3	2	(Finland) Mikko Hirvonen (Finland) Jarmo Lehtinen	(France) Citroën Total Abu Dhabi WRT (Citroën DS3 WRC)	3:21:57.1	23	396.82 km (246.57 mi)	29	23

Sébastien Ogier won the last non-European rally of the year. Volkswagen Motorsport II's Andreas Mikkelsen started leading the event with temporary co-driver Paul Nagle before losing the lead to championship leader Ogier, who won eight stages on the day. Early leader Mikkelsen finished the day in seventh position. On the second day, Ogier kept his stage-winning streak, to extend the lead to 45.9 seconds from Mikko Hirvonen. Kris Meeke went off the road in the third stage of the day. In the final day of competition, Ogier almost claimed the championship, but lost the opportunity when Hirvonen got a puncture on the final stage of the rally, to lose second place to Thierry Neuville; his fourth consecutive second place. After his puncture, Hirvonen finished third, ahead of Jari-Matti Latvala, Mads Østberg, Mikkelsen, Evgeny Novikov, local Nathan Quinn, Khalid Al Qassimi and Abdulaziz Al-Kuwari.

=== Round 11 — Rallye de France Alsace ===
Round	Rally name	Podium finishers					Statistics			
Round	Rally name	Pos.	No.	Driver	Team	Time	Stages	Length	Starters	Finishers
11	Rallye de France Alsace (4–7 October) — Results and report	1	8	(France) Sébastien Ogier (France) Julien Ingrassia	(Germany) Volkswagen Motorsport (Volkswagen Polo R WRC)	2:53:07.6	23	396.82 km (246.57 mi)	82	51
11	Rallye de France Alsace (4–7 October) — Results and report	2	3	(Spain) Dani Sordo (Spain) Carlos del Barrio	(France) Abu Dhabi Citroën WRT (Citroën DS3 WRC)	2:53:19.8	23	396.82 km (246.57 mi)	82	51
11	Rallye de France Alsace (4–7 October) — Results and report	3	7	(Finland) Jari-Matti Latvala (Finland) Miikka Anttila	(Germany) Volkswagen Motorsport (Volkswagen Polo R WRC)	2:53:27.1	23	396.82 km (246.57 mi)	82	51

Sébastien Ogier clinched the title after Thierry Neuville failed to win the opening stage of the event, which was denoted as the Power Stage. After struggling through the first day, Ogier took the lead on the final day of the rally. Neuville finished the first day in the lead, but lost it after a puncture on stage 11, and eventually finished fourth. Dani Sordo finished second, after battling for the lead from most of the rally, with Jari-Matti Latvala completing the podium in third overall. Evgeny Novikov finished fifth ahead of Mikko Hirvonen, Andreas Mikkelsen and Mads Østberg. WRC-2 frontrunner Robert Kubica scored more championship points with ninth, with sportscar racer Romain Dumas completing the points in tenth, in a one-off drive. Nine-time World Champion Sébastien Loeb failed to finish his last appearance in the championship after his car slid wide on stage 15 and rolled into a ditch.

=== Round 12 — Rally Catalunya ===
Round	Rally name	Podium finishers					Statistics			
Round	Rally name	Pos.	No.	Driver	Team	Time	Stages	Length	Starters	Finishers
12	(Spain) Rally Catalunya (25–27 October) — Results and report	1	8	(France) Sébastien Ogier (France) Julien Ingrassia	(Germany) Volkswagen Motorsport (Volkswagen Polo R WRC)	3:33:21.2	23	396.82 km (246.57 mi)	82	40
12	(Spain) Rally Catalunya (25–27 October) — Results and report	2	7	(Finland) Jari-Matti Latvala (Finland) Miikka Anttila	(Germany) Volkswagen Motorsport (Volkswagen Polo R WRC)	3:33:54.1	23	396.82 km (246.57 mi)	82	40
12	(Spain) Rally Catalunya (25–27 October) — Results and report	3	2	(Finland) Mikko Hirvonen (Finland) Jarmo Lehtinen	(France) Citroën Total Abu Dhabi WRT (Citroën DS3 WRC)	3:34:34.9	23	396.82 km (246.57 mi)	82	40

The Mixed event saw the first rally of Sébastien Ogier as a World Champion. Ogier started the event in the best way, winning all the night stages of the first day. Teammate Jari-Matti Latvala got the second place from local Dani Sordo on the last stage. On the second day of tarmac stages, Ogier lost the lead to Latvala after a puncture, promoting Sordo and Thierry Neuville to second and third respectively. The last day of competition, on gravel, saw Ogier fight back from sixth to become the rally leader. Latvala finished second. This one-two finish for Volkswagen Motorsport enabled the team to win the Manufacturers' Championship. Mikko Hirvonen finished third after teammate Sordo retired with a broken suspension. M-Sport's trio of Neuville, Evgeny Novikov and Mads Østberg finished fourth, fifth and sixth respectively, followed by Martin Prokop and Hayden Paddon in seventh and eighth. In ninth was Robert Kubica, to clinch the WRC2 title, ahead of rival Abdulaziz Al-Kuwari.

=== Round 13 — Wales Rally GB ===
Round	Rally name	Podium finishers					Statistics			
Round	Rally name	Pos.	No.	Driver	Team	Time	Stages	Length	Starters	Finishers
13	(United Kingdom) Wales Rally GB (15–17 November) — Results and report	1	8	(France) Sébastien Ogier (France) Julien Ingrassia	(Germany) Volkswagen Motorsport (Volkswagen Polo R WRC)	3:03:36.7	23	396.82 km (246.57 mi)	56	43
13	(United Kingdom) Wales Rally GB (15–17 November) — Results and report	2	7	(Finland) Jari-Matti Latvala (Finland) Miikka Anttila	(Germany) Volkswagen Motorsport (Volkswagen Polo R WRC)	3:03:58.5	23	396.82 km (246.57 mi)	56	43
13	(United Kingdom) Wales Rally GB (15–17 November) — Results and report	3	11	(Belgium) Thierry Neuville (Belgium) Nicolas Gilsoul	(United Kingdom) Qatar World Rally Team (Ford Fiesta RS WRC)	3:05:01.2	23	396.82 km (246.57 mi)	56	43

Sébastien Ogier won the last event of the season to round up a year with nine wins. Ogier led the event from start to finish, with teammate Jari-Matti Latvala and Thierry Neuville completing the podium after taking their final positions on stage 6. Robert Kubica, who was making his début in a Citroën DS3 WRC, rolled his car on the first stage of the second day of competition. Kubica later rejoined on the third day, only to roll out again on stage 11. Day four saw the end of a three-way battle for third in favour of Neuville between him, Mads Østberg and Andreas Mikkelsen, who finished fourth and fifth respectively. Martin Prokop finished sixth, with Dani Sordo in seventh after taking a five-minute penalty for a breach of the chassis regulations. The top ten finishers were completed by WRC2 drivers Elfyn Evans, Jari Ketomaa and Mark Higgins, all driving Ford Fiesta R5 cars.

Notes:

- ^† — Rally was shortened after stages were cancelled.

== Results and standings ==
=== FIA World Rally Championship for Drivers ===
Points are awarded to the top 10 classified finishers. There are also 3 bonus points awarded for Power Stage wins, 2 for second place and 1 for third.

Position	1st	2nd	3rd	4th	5th	6th	7th	8th	9th	10th
Points	25	18	15	12	10	8	6	4	2	1

Pos.	Driver	MON (Monaco)	SWE (Sweden)	MEX (Mexico)	POR (Portugal)	ARG (Argentina)	GRE (Greece)	ITA (Italy)	FIN (Finland)	GER (Germany)	AUS (Australia)	FRA (France)	ESP (Spain)	GBR (United Kingdom)	Points
1	(France) Sébastien Ogier	2	1^{1}	1^{1}	1^{1}	2^{2}	10^{1}	1^{1}	1^{2}	17^{1}	1^{1}	1^{3}	1^{2}	1	290
2	(Belgium) Thierry Neuville	Ret	5	3	17	5	3	2^{2}	2^{1}	2	2^{2}	4^{2}	4^{1}	3^{1}	176
3	(Finland) Jari-Matti Latvala	Ret	4^{2}	16^{3}	3^{3}	3^{1}	1	3^{3}	17^{3}	7^{3}	4	3	2^{3}	2	162
4	(Finland) Mikko Hirvonen	4	17	2	2	6^{3}	8	Ret	4	3	3	6	3	Ret	126
5	(Spain) Dani Sordo	3	Ret	4	12	9	2	4	5	1^{2}		2^{1}	Ret	7	123
6	(Norway) Mads Østberg	6	3^{3}	11^{2}	8^{2}	7	6	8	3	9	5	8	6	4^{3}	102
7	(Russia) Evgeny Novikov	Ret	9	10	4	4	9^{2}	Ret	6	10	7^{3}	5	5	19^{2}	69
8	(France) Sébastien Loeb	1	2			1						Ret			68
9	(Czech Republic) Martin Prokop	7	7	9	7	10	7	5	Ret	4		Ret	7	6	63
10	(Norway) Andreas Mikkelsen				6	8	4^{3}	Ret	10	WD	6	7	Ret	5	50
11	(Qatar) Nasser Al-Attiyah			5	5		5			13			Ret	WD	30
12	(United Kingdom) Elfyn Evans				23			6	Ret	6		11	Ret	8	20
13	(Poland) Robert Kubica				19		11	9	9	5		9	9	Ret	18
14	(France) Bryan Bouffier	5			13			31	WD					Ret	10
15	(Finland) Juho Hänninen	Ret	6		WD				32						8
16	(Australia) Chris Atkinson			6											8
17	(Finland) Jari Ketomaa		Ret						7					9	8
18	(New Zealand) Hayden Paddon								11	8	17		8		8
19	(Poland) Michał Kościuszko	10	14	Ret	Ret	Ret	WD	7		Ret					7
20	(United States) Ken Block			7											6
21	(United Arab Emirates) Khalid Al Qassimi		Ret		9		Ret	10		11	9		11		5
22	(Germany) Sepp Wiegand	8	13		14			Ret		14			Ret	WD	4
23	(Sweden) Per-Gunnar Andersson		WD		Ret			13	8	Ret					4
24	(Mexico) Benito Guerra		WD	8									14	WD	4
25	(Norway) Henning Solberg		8												4
26	(Australia) Nathan Quinn										8				4
27	(Switzerland) Olivier Burri	9													2
28	(Qatar) Abdulaziz Al-Kuwari			12	16	13	13	11			10		10	WD	2
29	(Saudi Arabia) Yazeed Al-Rajhi		10		WD				12		12		12	18	1
30	(Finland) Esapekka Lappi	Ret			10				31						1
31	(France) Romain Dumas											10			1
32	(United Kingdom) Mark Higgins													10	1
Pos.	Driver	MON (Monaco)	SWE (Sweden)	MEX (Mexico)	POR (Portugal)	ARG (Argentina)	GRE (Greece)	ITA (Italy)	FIN (Finland)	GER (Germany)	AUS (Australia)	FRA (France)	ESP (Spain)	GBR (United Kingdom)	Points

Key
Colour	Result
Gold	Winner
Silver	2nd place
Bronze	3rd place
Green	Points finish
Blue	Non-points finish
Blue	Non-classified finish (NC)
Purple	Did not finish (Ret)
Black	Excluded (EX)
Black	Disqualified (DSQ)
White	Did not start (DNS)
White	Cancelled (C)
Blank	Withdrew entry from the event (WD)

Notes:
^{1 2 3} – Indicate position on Power Stage

=== FIA World Rally Championship for Co-Drivers ===
Pos.	Co-Driver	MON (Monaco)	SWE (Sweden)	MEX (Mexico)	POR (Portugal)	ARG (Argentina)	GRE (Greece)	ITA (Italy)	FIN (Finland)	GER (Germany)	AUS (Australia)	FRA (France)	ESP (Spain)	GBR (United Kingdom)	Points
1	(France) Julien Ingrassia	2	1^{1}	1^{1}	1^{1}	2^{2}	10^{1}	1^{1}	1^{2}	17^{1}	1^{1}	1^{3}	1^{3}	1	290
2	(Belgium) Nicolas Gilsoul	Ret	5	3	17	5	3	2^{2}	2^{1}	2	2^{2}	4^{2}	4^{1}	3^{1}	176
3	(Finland) Miikka Anttila	Ret	4^{2}	16^{3}	3^{3}	3^{1}	1	3^{3}	17^{3}	7^{3}	4	3	2^{2}	2	162
4	(Finland) Jarmo Lehtinen	4	17	2	2	6^{3}	8	Ret	4	3	3	6	3	Ret	126
5	(Spain) Carlos del Barrio	3	Ret	4	12	9	2	4	5	1^{2}		2^{1}	Ret	7	123
6	(Sweden) Jonas Andersson	6	3^{3}	11^{2}	8^{2}	7	6	8	3	9	5	8	6	4^{2}	102
7	(Austria) Ilka Minor	Ret	9	10	4	4	9^{2}	Ret	6	10	7^{1}	5	5	19^{2}	69
8	(Monaco) Daniel Elena	1	2			1						Ret			68
9	(Czech Republic) Michal Ernst	7	7	9	7	10	7	5	Ret	4		Ret	7	6	63
10	(Italy) Giovanni Bernacchini		27	5	5		5	6	13				Ret	WD	38
11	(Finland) Mikko Markkula				6	8	4^{3}	Ret	10	WD			Ret	5	36
12	(Poland) Maciej Baran				19		11	9	9	5		9	9		18
13	(Republic of Ireland) Paul Nagle										6	7			14
14	(United Kingdom) Daniel Barritt				32				Ret	6		11	Ret	8	12
15	(France) Xavier Panseri	5			13			31	WD					Ret	10
16	(Finland) Tomi Tuominen	Ret	6		WD				32						8
17	(Belgium) Stephane Prévot			6											8
18	(Sweden) Emil Axelsson		8		Ret			13	8	Ret					8
19	(New Zealand) John Kennard								11	8	17		8		8
20	(Poland) Maciej Szczepaniak	10	14	Ret	Ret	Ret	WD	7		Ret					7
21	(Italy) Alex Gelsomino			7											6
22	(Finland) Marko Sallinen								7						6
23	(United Kingdom) Scott Martin		Ret		9		Ret	10		11	9		11		5
24	(Germany) Frank Christian	8	13		14			Ret		14			Ret		4
25	(Spain) Borja Rozada		WD	8									14		4
26	(Australia) Glenn MacNeall										8				4
27	(France) Guillaume Duval	9										17			2
28	(Republic of Ireland) Killian Duffy			12	16	13	13	11			10		10	WD	2
29	(Finland) Tapio Suominen													9	1
30	(United Kingdom) Michael Orr		10		WD				12		13		12	18	1
31	(Finland) Janne Ferm	Ret			10				31						1
32	(France) Denis Giraudet											10		11	1
33	(United Kingdom) Carl Williamson													10	1
Pos.	Co-Driver	MON (Monaco)	SWE (Sweden)	MEX (Mexico)	POR (Portugal)	ARG (Argentina)	GRE (Greece)	ITA (Italy)	FIN (Finland)	GER (Germany)	AUS (Australia)	FRA (France)	ESP (Spain)	GBR (United Kingdom)	Points

Key
Colour	Result
Gold	Winner
Silver	2nd place
Bronze	3rd place
Green	Points finish
Blue	Non-points finish
Blue	Non-classified finish (NC)
Purple	Did not finish (Ret)
Black	Excluded (EX)
Black	Disqualified (DSQ)
White	Did not start (DNS)
White	Cancelled (C)
Blank	Withdrew entry from the event (WD)

Notes:
^{1 2 3} – Indicate position on Power Stage

=== FIA World Rally Championship for Manufacturers ===
Pos.	Manufacturer	No.	MON (Monaco)	SWE (Sweden)	MEX (Mexico)	POR (Portugal)	ARG (Argentina)	GRE (Greece)	ITA (Italy)	FIN (Finland)	GER (Germany)	AUS (Australia)	FRA (France)	ESP (Spain)	GBR (United Kingdom)	Points
1	(Germany) Volkswagen Motorsport	7	Ret	4	10	3	3	1	3	7	5	4	3	2	2	425
1	(Germany) Volkswagen Motorsport	8	2	1	1	1	2	10	1	1	10	1	1	1	1	425
2	(France) Citroën Total Abu Dhabi World Rally Team	1	1	2			1						Ret			280
2	(France) Citroën Total Abu Dhabi World Rally Team	2	4	9	2	2	6	8	Ret	4	3	3	6	3	Ret	280
2	(France) Citroën Total Abu Dhabi World Rally Team	3			4	9		2	4	5	1	Ret		Ret	7	280
3	(United Kingdom) Qatar M-Sport World Rally Team (Note: Following Ford's withdrawal from the category as a manufacturer team, the FIA recognised Qatar M-Sport as the de facto manufacturer team, subjecting them to the same rules as other manufacturer teams.)	4	5	3	9	7	7	6	7	3	6	5	8	6	4	190
3	(United Kingdom) Qatar M-Sport World Rally Team	5	Ret	7	8	4	4	9	Ret	6	7	7	5	5	8	190
4	(United Kingdom) Qatar World Rally Team	6	Ret		5			5			9			Ret	WD	184
4	(United Kingdom) Qatar World Rally Team	11	Ret	5	3	10	5	3	2	2	2	2	4	4	3	184
5	(Czech Republic) Jipocar Czech National Team	21		6	7	6	10	7	5	Ret	4		Ret	7	6	65
6	(France) Abu Dhabi Citroën Total World Rally Team	10	3	Ret	6	8	9	Ret	8	Ret	8	8	2	8	Ret	63
7	(Germany) Volkswagen Motorsport II	9				5	8	4	Ret		WD	6	7	Ret	5	50
8	(Italy) / (Poland) Lotos Team WRC (Note: Although Lotos Team WRC is recognised by the FIA as a manufacturer team, only their best eight results from thirteen rallies will be counted towards the team's final points tally.)	12	6	8	Ret	Ret	Ret	WD	6		Ret					20
Pos.	Manufacturer	No.	MON (Monaco)	SWE (Sweden)	MEX (Mexico)	POR (Portugal)	ARG (Argentina)	GRE (Greece)	ITA (Italy)	FIN (Finland)	GER (Germany)	AUS (Australia)	FRA (France)	ESP (Spain)	GBR (United Kingdom)	Points

Key
Colour	Result
Gold	Winner
Silver	2nd place
Bronze	3rd place
Green	Points finish
Blue	Non-points finish
Blue	Non-classified finish (NC)
Purple	Did not finish (Ret)
Black	Excluded (EX)
Black	Disqualified (DSQ)
White	Did not start (DNS)
White	Cancelled (C)
Blank	Withdrew entry from the event (WD)
