= 2013 Rallye de France-Alsace =

Motor rally competition

2013 Rallye de France-Alsace 4th Rallye de France-Alsace
Round 11 of 13 in the 2013 World Rally Championship
← Previous event	Next event →
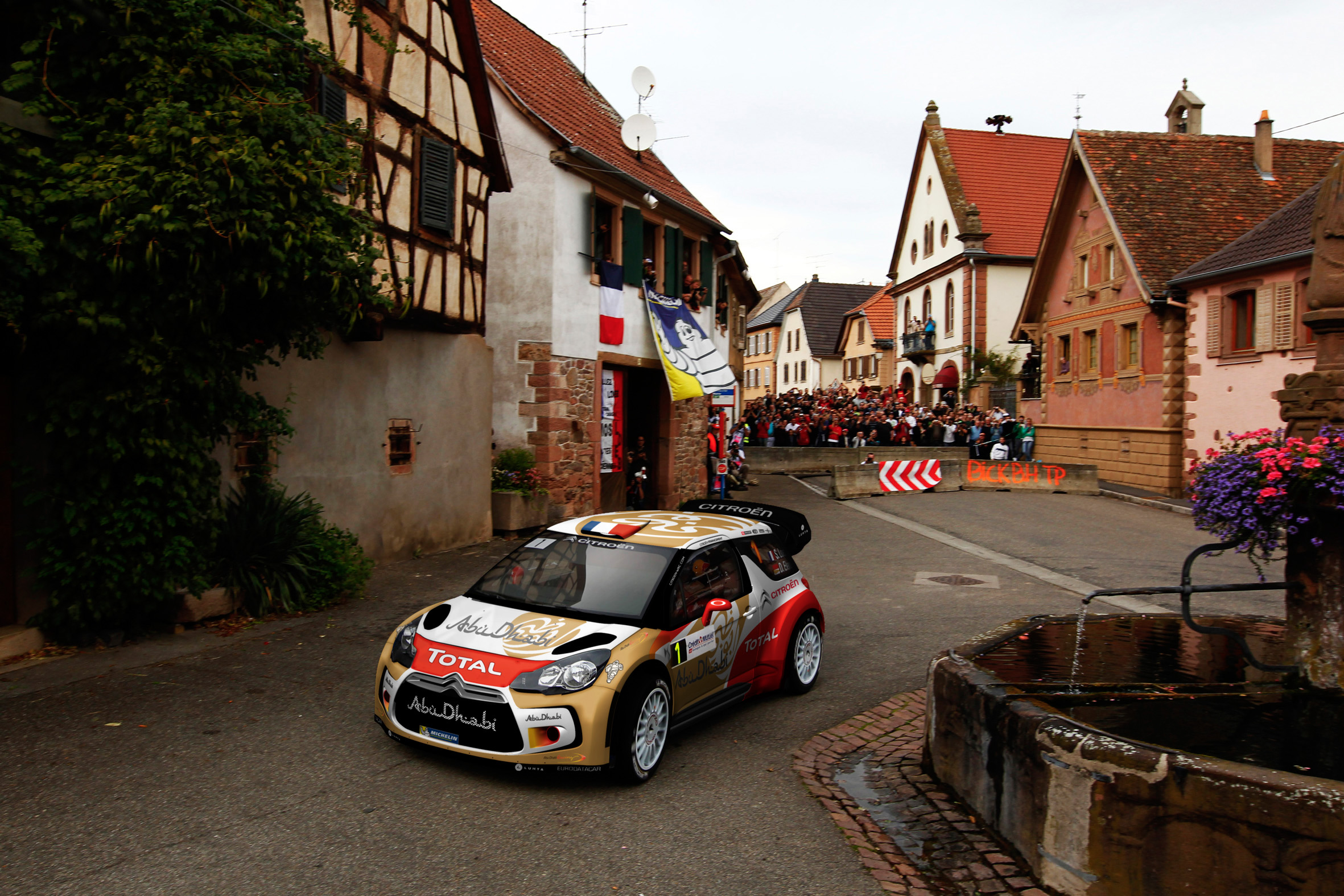
- Host country: France
- Rally base: Strasbourg
- Dates run: October 3 – 6, 2013
- Stages: 20 (312.14 km; 193.95 miles)
- Stage surface: Asphalt

Statistics
- Crews: 82 at start, 49 at finish

Overall results
- Overall winner: (France) Sébastien Ogier (France) Julien Ingrassia (Germany) Volkswagen Motorsport; 2:53:07.6
- Power Stage winner: (Spain) Dani Sordo (Spain) Carlos del Barrio (France) Abu Dhabi Citroën Total WRT

The 4th Rallye de France Alsace was the eleventh round of the 2013 World Rally Championship, held from 3 to 6 October, 2013. Sébastien Ogier once again won the rally.

== Results ==
=== Event standings ===
Pos.	No.	Driver	Co-Driver	Team	Car	Class	Time	Difference	Points
Overall classification
1	8	(France) Sébastien Ogier	(France) Julien Ingrassia	(Germany) Volkswagen Motorsport	Volkswagen Polo R WRC	WRC	2:53:07.6	0.0	26
2	10	(Spain) Dani Sordo	(Spain) Carlos del Barrio	(France) Abu Dhabi Citroën Total WRT	Citroën DS3 WRC	WRC	2:25:19.8	+12.2	21
3	7	(Finland) Jari-Matti Latvala	(Finland) Miikka Anttila	(Germany) Volkswagen Motorsport	Volkswagen Polo R WRC	WRC	2:53:27.1	+19.5	15
4	11	(Belgium) Thierry Neuville	(Belgium) Nicolas Gilsoul	(United Kingdom) Qatar World Rally Team	Ford Fiesta RS WRC	WRC	2:54:21.7	+1:14.1	14
5	5	(Russia) Evgeny Novikov	(Austria) Ilka Minor-Petrasko	(United Kingdom) Qatar M-Sport World Rally Team	Ford Fiesta RS WRC	WRC	2:56:18.5	+3:10.9	10
6	2	(Finland) Mikko Hirvonen	(Finland) Jarmo Lehtinen	(France) Citroën Total Abu Dhabi WRT	Citroën DS3 WRC	WRC	2:56:45.3	+3:37.7	8
7	9	(Norway) Andreas Mikkelsen	(Republic of Ireland) Paul Nagle	(Germany) Volkswagen Motorsport II	Volkswagen Polo R WRC	WRC	2:57:11.8	+4:04.2	6
8	4	(Norway) Mads Østberg	(Sweden) Jonas Andersson	(United Kingdom) Qatar M-Sport World Rally Team	Ford Fiesta RS WRC	WRC	2:57:42.8	+4:35.2	4
9	74	(Poland) Robert Kubica	(Poland) Maciej Baran	(France) PH Sport	Citroën DS3 RRC	WRC-2	3:02:39.0	+9:31.4	2
10	22	(France) Romain Dumas	(France) Denis Giraudet	(United Kingdom) M-Sport	Ford Fiesta RS WRC	WRC	3:05:03.4	+11:55.8	1
WRC-2 standings
1 (9.)	74	(Poland) Robert Kubica	(Poland) Maciej Baran	(France) PH Sport	Citroën DS3 RRC	WRC-2	3:02:39.0	0.0	25
2 (11.)	75	(United Kingdom) Elfyn Evans	(United Kingdom) Daniel Barritt	(United Kingdom) Qatar M-Sport World Rally Team	Ford Fiesta R5	WRC-2	3:06:42.9	+4:03.9	18
3 (19.)	36	(United Arab Emirates) Rashid Al-Ketbi	(Germany) Karina Hepperle	(United Arab Emirates) Skydive Dubai Rally Team	Ford Fiesta R5	WRC-2	3:21:49.6	+19:10.6	15
4 (26.)	79	(Republic of Ireland) Robert Barrable	(United Kingdom) Stuart Loudon	(United Kingdom) CA1 Sport Ltd	Ford Fiesta R5	WRC-2	3:32:46.0	+30:07.0	12
5 (27.)	38	(Mexico) Ricardo Triviño	(Spain) Alex Haro	(Mexico) Moto Club Igualda	Subaru Impreza WRX STi	WRC-2	3:33:38.6	+30:59.6	10
6 (34.)	91	(Venezuela) Alejandro Lombardo	(Ecuador) Adolfo Espinoza	(Italy) Ralliart Italia	Mitsubishi Lancer Evo X	WRC-2	3:38:42.6	+36:03.6	8
7 (36.)	71	(Jordan) Ala'a Rasheed	(Lebanon) Joseph Matar	(Lebanon) Motortune Racing	Ford Fiesta R5	WRC-2	3:43:01.6	+40:22.6	6
8 (37.)	43	(Czech Republic) Martin Hudec	(Czech Republic) Jakub Kotál	(Czech Republic) Martin Semerád	Mitsubishi Lancer Evo IX	WRC-2	3:43:38.8	+40:59.8	4
WRC-3 standings
1 (13.)	52	(France) Quentin Gilbert	(Belgium) Renaud Jamoul	(France) PH Sport	Citroën DS3 R3T	WRC-3	3:12:51.2	0.0	25
2 (14.)	51	(France) Sébastien Chardonnet	(France) Thibault de la Haye	(Belgium) MY Racing	Citroën DS3 R3T	WRC-3	3:13:45.1	+53.9	18
3 (15.)	60	(Republic of Ireland) Keith Cronin	(United Kingdom) Marshall Clarke	(United Kingdom) Charles Hurst Citroën Belfast	Citroën DS3 R3T	WRC-3	3:15:23.8	+2:32.6	15
4 (16.)	58	(Germany) Christian Riedemann	(Belgium) Lara Vanneste	(Germany) ADAC Team Wesser-Ems	Citroën DS3 R3T	WRC-3	3:16:49.3	+3:58.1	12
JWRC standings^{†}
1	102	(Sweden) Pontus Tidemand	(Norway) Ola Fløene	(Sweden) Pontus Tidemand	Ford Fiesta R2	JWRC	2:41:37.4	0.0	26
2	112	(Luxembourg) Hugo Arellano	(France) Gaëtan Houssin	(Luxembourg) Hugo Arellano	Ford Fiesta R2	JWRC	2:42:19.7	+42.3	18
3	110	(Spain) Yeray Lemes	(Spain) Rogelio Peñate	(Spain) Yeray Lemes	Ford Fiesta R2	JWRC	2:42:48.0	+1:10.6	22
4	109	(Norway) Marius Aasen	(Norway) Marlene Engan	(Norway) Marius Aasen	Ford Fiesta R2	JWRC	2:42:53.2	+1:15.8	13
5	103	(Slovakia) Martin Koči	(Czech Republic) Lucáš Kostka	(Slovakia) Styllex Motorsport	Ford Fiesta R2	JWRC	2:43:31.6	+1:54.2	10
6	107	(Switzerland) Michaël Burri	(France) Gabin Moreau	(Switzerland) Michaël Burri	Ford Fiesta R2	JWRC	2:44:08.8	+2:31.4	8
7	106	(Turkey) Murat Bostancı	(Turkey) Onur Vatansever	(Turkey) Castrol Ford Team Türkiye	Ford Fiesta R2	JWRC	2:45:43.7	+4:06.3	6
8	100	(Estonia) Sander Pärn	(Estonia) Ken Järveoeja	(Estonia) Sander Pärn	Ford Fiesta R2	JWRC	2:46:15.7	+4:38.3	4
9	108	(Finland) Niko-Pekka Nieminen	(Finland) Mikael Korhonen	(Finland) Niko-Pekka Nieminen	Ford Fiesta R2	JWRC	2:48:16.6	+6:39.2	2

^† - The Junior WRC contests only the first 14 stages of the rally.

=== Special Stages ===
Day	Stage	Name	Length	Winner	Car	Time	Rally Leader
Leg 1 (3-4 October)	SS1	Strasbourg Power Stage	4.55 km	(Spain) Dani Sordo	Citroën DS3 WRC	3:20.8	(Spain) Dani Sordo
Leg 1 (3-4 October)	SS2	Klevener 1	10.66 km	(France) Sébastien Loeb	Citroën DS3 WRC	6:00.0	(Spain) Dani Sordo
Leg 1 (3-4 October)	SS3	Massif des Grands Crus 1	13.04 km	(France) Sébastien Loeb	Citroën DS3 WRC	7:46.6	(Spain) Dani Sordo
Leg 1 (3-4 October)	SS4	Vosges - Pays d'Ormont 1	34.34 km	(France) Sébastien Loeb	Citroën DS3 WRC	19:08.7	(France) Sébastien Loeb
Leg 1 (3-4 October)	SS5	Klevener 2	10.66 km	(Belgium) Thierry Neuville	Ford Fiesta RS WRC	6:02.8	(France) Sébastien Loeb
Leg 1 (3-4 October)	SS6	Massif des Grands Crus 2	13.04 km	(Belgium) Thierry Neuville	Ford Fiesta RS WRC	7:53.4	(Belgium) Thierry Neuville
Leg 1 (3-4 October)	SS7	Vosges - Pays d'Ormont 2	34.34 km	(Belgium) Thierry Neuville	Ford Fiesta RS WRC	18:36.6	(Belgium) Thierry Neuville
Leg 2 (5 October)	SS8	Hohlandsbourg - Firstplan 1	28.48 km	(France) Sébastien Ogier	Volkswagen Polo R WRC	14:37.7	(Belgium) Thierry Neuville
Leg 2 (5 October)	SS9	Vallée de Munster 1	16.73 km	(France) Sébastien Ogier	Volkswagen Polo R WRC	8:27.4	(Belgium) Thierry Neuville
Leg 2 (5 October)	SS10	Soultzeren - Pays Welche 1	19.93 km	(France) Sébastien Loeb	Citroën DS3 WRC	9:47.2	(Belgium) Thierry Neuville
Leg 2 (5 October)	SS11	Hohlandsbourg - Firstplan 2	28.48 km	(France) Sébastien Ogier	Volkswagen Polo R WRC	14:41.5	(Spain) Dani Sordo
Leg 2 (5 October)	SS12	Vallée de Munster	16.73 km	(France) Sébastien Ogier	Volkswagen Polo R WRC	8:31.3	(Spain) Dani Sordo
Leg 2 (5 October)	SS13	Soultzeren - Pays Welche 2	19.93 km	(Belgium) Thierry Neuville	Ford Fiesta RS WRC	9:49.4	(Spain) Dani Sordo
Leg 2 (5 October)	SS14	Mulhouse	4.65 km	(France) Sébastien Ogier	Volkswagen Polo R WRC	3:35.6	(Finland) Jari-Matti Latvala
Leg 3 (6 October)	SS15	Vignoble de Cleebourg 1	14.60 km	(France) Sébastien Ogier	Volkswagen Polo R WRC	8:23.7	(France) Sébastien Ogier
Leg 3 (6 October)	SS16	Bischwiller - Gries 1	7.95 km	(France) Sébastien Ogier	Volkswagen Polo R WRC	4:16.3	(France) Sébastien Ogier
Leg 3 (6 October)	SS17	Haguenau 1	5.74 km	(France) Sébastien Ogier	Volkswagen Polo R WRC	4:18.5	(France) Sébastien Ogier
Leg 3 (6 October)	SS18	Vignoble de Cleebourg 2	14.60 km	(Spain) Dani Sordo	Citroën DS3 WRC	8:36.7	(France) Sébastien Ogier
Leg 3 (6 October)	SS19	Bischwiller - Gries 2	7.95 km	(Finland) Jari-Matti Latvala	Volkswagen Polo R WRC	4:13.3	(France) Sébastien Ogier
Leg 3 (6 October)	SS20	Haguenau 2	5.74 km	(Belgium) Thierry Neuville	Ford Fiesta RS WRC	4:10.8	(France) Sébastien Ogier

=== Power Stage ===
The "Power Stage" was a 4.55 km (2.87 mi) stage at the beginning of the rally.

Pos.	Driver	Car	Time	Diff.	Pts.
1	(Spain) Dani Sordo	Citroën DS3 WRC	3:20.8	0.0	3
2	(Belgium) Thierry Neuville	Ford Fiesta RS WRC	3:21.5	+0.7	2
3	(France) Sébastien Ogier	Volkswagen Polo R WRC	3:21.6	+0.8	1

=== Standings after the rally ===
Drivers' Championship standings

Pos.	Driver	Points
1	(France) Sebastien Ogier	235
2	(Belgium) Thierry Neuville	143
3	(Finland) Jari-Matti Latvala	124
4	(Spain) Dani Sordo	117
5	(Finland) Mikko Hirvonen	111

Manufacturers' Championship standings

Pos.	Manufacturer	Points
1	(Germany) Volkswagen Motorsport	339
2	(France) Citroën Total Abu Dhabi WRT	259
3	(United Kingdom) Qatar M-Sport World Rally Team	156
4	(United Kingdom) Qatar World Rally Team	151
5	(France) Abu Dhabi Citroën Total WRT	62

=== Other ===
WRC-2 Drivers' Championship standings

Pos.	Driver	Points
1	(Poland) Robert Kubica	126
2	(Qatar) Abdulaziz Al-Kuwari	118
3	(Ukraine) Yuriy Protasov	83
4	(Peru) Nicolás Fuchs	78
5	(Germany) Sepp Wiegand	67

WRC-3 Drivers' Championship standings

Pos.	Driver	Points
1	(France) Sébastien Chardonnet	116
2	(Republic of Ireland) Keith Cronin	86
3	(France) Quentin Gilbert	75
4	(Germany) Christian Riedemann	52
5	(France) Bryan Bouffier	29

JWRC Drivers' Championship standings

Pos.	Driver	Points
1	(Sweden) Pontus Tidemand	131
2	(Spain) Yeray Lemes	73
3	(Spain) José Antonio Suárez	68
4	(Estonia) Sander Pärn	55
5	(Switzerland) Michaël Burri	46
=	(Slovakia) Martin Koči	46
