= 2013 Rally Catalunya =

Motor rally competition

2013 Rally Catalunya: 49. RallyRACC Catalunya - Costa Daurada 2013
Round 12 of 13 in the 2013 World Rally Championship
← Previous event	Next event →
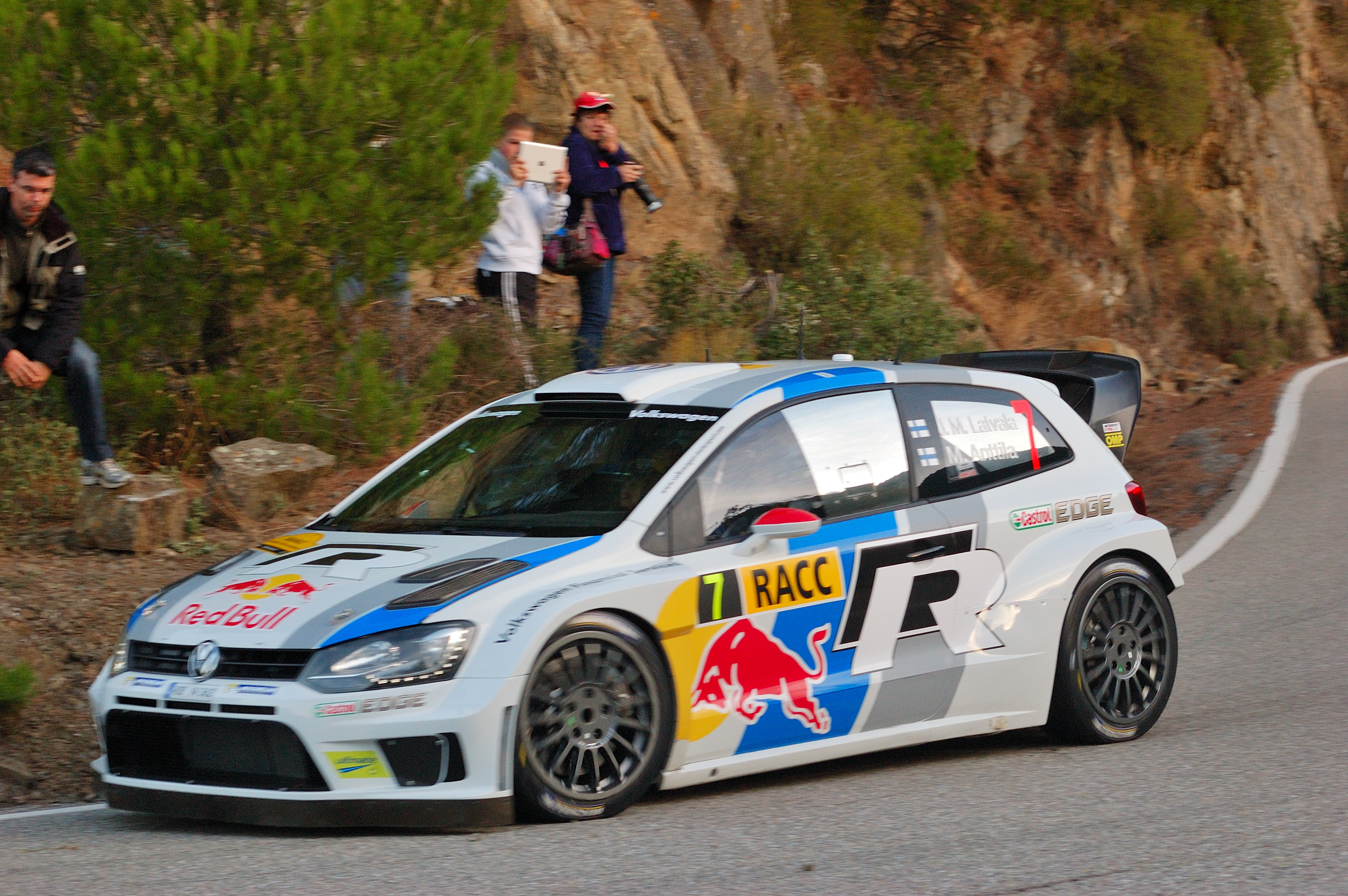
- Host country: Spain
- Rally base: Salou
- Dates run: October 24 – 27, 2013
- Stages: 15 (355.92 km; 221.16 miles)
- Stage surface: Asphalt and gravel

Statistics
- Crews: 59 at start, 40 at finish

Overall results
- Overall winner: (France) Sébastien Ogier (France) Julien Ingrassia (Germany) Volkswagen Motorsport
- Power Stage winner: (Belgium) Thierry Neuville (Belgium) Nicolas Gilsoul (United Kingdom) Qatar World Rally Team

The 49th Rally Catalunya was the twelfth and penultimate round of the 2013 World Rally Championship, held from 24 to 27 October 2013 around Salou, Catalonia, Spain. Sébastien Ogier won the rally, his eighth victory of the season.

== Results ==
=== Event standings ===
Pos.	No.	Driver	Co-Driver	Team	Car	Class	Time	Difference	Points
Overall classification
1	8	(France) Sébastien Ogier	(France) Julien Ingrassia	(Germany) Volkswagen Motorsport	Volkswagen Polo R WRC	WRC	3:33:21.2	0.0	27
2	7	(Finland) Jari-Matti Latvala	(Finland) Miikka Anttila	(Germany) Volkswagen Motorsport	Volkswagen Polo R WRC	WRC	3:33:54.1	+32.9	19
3	2	(Finland) Mikko Hirvonen	(Finland) Jarmo Lehtinen	(France) Citroën Total Abu Dhabi WRT	Citroën DS3 WRC	WRC	3:34:34.9	+1:13.7	15
4	11	(Belgium) Thierry Neuville	(Belgium) Nicolas Gilsoul	(United Kingdom) Qatar World Rally Team	Ford Fiesta RS WRC	WRC	3:34:55.1	+1:33.9	15
5	5	(Russia) Evgeny Novikov	(Austria) Ilka Minor-Petrasko	(United Kingdom) Qatar M-Sport World Rally Team	Ford Fiesta RS WRC	WRC	3:35:22.2	+2:01.0	10
6	4	(Norway) Mads Østberg	(Sweden) Jonas Andersson	(United Kingdom) Qatar M-Sport World Rally Team	Ford Fiesta RS WRC	WRC	3:35:47.2	+2:26.0	8
7	21	(Czech Republic) Martin Prokop	(Czech Republic) Michal Ernst	(Czech Republic) Jipocar Czech National Team	Ford Fiesta RS WRC	WRC	3:38:17.0	+4:55.8	6
8	22	(New Zealand) Hayden Paddon	(New Zealand) John Kennard	(United Kingdom) Qatar M-Sport World Rally Team	Ford Fiesta RS WRC	WRC	3:40:16.9	+6:55.7	4
9	74	(Poland) Robert Kubica	(Poland) Maciej Baran	(France) PH Sport	Citroën DS3 RRC	WRC-2	3:44:35.3	+11:14.1	2
10	23	(Qatar) Abdulaziz Al-Kuwari	(Republic of Ireland) Killian Duffy	Seashore Qatar Rally Team	Ford Fiesta RS WRC	WRC	3:46:48.0	+13:26.8	1

=== Special Stages ===
Day	Stage	Name	Length	Winner	Car	Time	Rally Leader
Leg 1 (25 October) Asphalt	SS1	Querol	21.26 km	(France) Sébastien Ogier	Volkswagen Polo R WRC	11:23.6	(France) Sébastien Ogier
Leg 1 (25 October) Asphalt	SS2	Montmell	24.14 km	(France) Sébastien Ogier	Volkswagen Polo R WRC	12:40.4	(France) Sébastien Ogier
Leg 1 (25 October) Asphalt	SS3	Riudecanyes 1	16.35 km	(France) Sébastien Ogier	Volkswagen Polo R WRC	10:35.9	(France) Sébastien Ogier
Leg 2 (26 October) Asphalt	SS4	Riudecanyes 2	16.35 km	(Finland) Jari-Matti Latvala (Spain) Dani Sordo	Volkswagen Polo R WRC; Citroën DS3 WRC	10:26.2	(France) Sébastien Ogier
Leg 2 (26 October) Asphalt	SS5	El Priorat 1	42.04 km	(Spain) Dani Sordo	Citroën DS3 WRC	23:22.4	(France) Sébastien Ogier
Leg 2 (26 October) Asphalt	SS6	Colldejou 1	26.48 km	(Finland) Jari-Matti Latvala	Volkswagen Polo R WRC	15:35.0	(Finland) Jari-Matti Latvala (Spain) Dani Sordo
Leg 2 (26 October) Asphalt	SS7	El Priorat 2	42.04 km	(France) Sébastien Ogier	Volkswagen Polo R WRC	23:35.4	(Finland) Jari-Matti Latvala
Leg 2 (26 October) Asphalt	SS8	Colldejou 2 (Power Stage)	26.48 km	(Belgium) Thierry Neuville	Ford Fiesta RS WRC	15:36.8	(Finland) Jari-Matti Latvala
Leg 2 (26 October) Asphalt	SS9	Salou	2.24 km	(Finland) Jari-Matti Latvala	Volkswagen Polo R WRC	2:36.3	(Finland) Jari-Matti Latvala
Leg 3 (27 October) Gravel	SS10	Gandesa 1	7.00 km	(Norway) Andreas Mikkelsen	Volkswagen Polo R WRC	4:31.0	(Finland) Jari-Matti Latvala
Leg 3 (27 October) Gravel	SS11	Pesells 1	26.59 km	(Norway) Andreas Mikkelsen	Volkswagen Polo R WRC	15:30.9	(Finland) Jari-Matti Latvala
Leg 3 (27 October) Gravel	SS12	Terra Alta 1	35.68 km	(France) Sébastien Ogier	Volkswagen Polo R WRC	23:34.3	(Finland) Jari-Matti Latvala
Leg 3 (27 October) Gravel	SS13	Gandesa 2	7.00 km	(France) Sébastien Ogier	Volkswagen Polo R WRC	4:25.1	(Finland) Jari-Matti Latvala
Leg 3 (27 October) Gravel	SS14	Pesells 2	26.59 km	(France) Sébastien Ogier	Volkswagen Polo R WRC	14:59.6	(France) Sébastien Ogier
Leg 3 (27 October) Gravel	SS15	Terra Alta 2	35.68 km	(France) Sébastien Ogier	Volkswagen Polo R WRC	23:11.6	(France) Sébastien Ogier

=== Power Stage ===
The "Power Stage" was a 26.48 km (16.45 mi) stage during the second leg of the rally.

Pos.	Driver	Car	Time	Diff.	Pts.
1	(Belgium) Thierry Neuville	Ford Fiesta RS WRC	15:36.8	0.0	3
2	(France) Sébastien Ogier	Volkswagen Polo R WRC	15:39.6	+2.8	2
3	(Finland) Jari-Matti Latvala	Volkswagen Polo R WRC	15:40.0	+3.2	1

=== Standings after the rally ===
Drivers' Championship standings

Pos.	Driver	Points
1	(France) Sebastien Ogier	265
2	(Belgium) Thierry Neuville	158
3	(Finland) Jari-Matti Latvala	144
4	(Finland) Mikko Hirvonen	126
5	(Spain) Dani Sordo	117

Manufacturers' Championship standings

Pos.	Manufacturer	Points
1	(Germany) Volkswagen Motorsport	382
2	(France) Citroën Total Abu Dhabi WRT	274
3	(United Kingdom) Qatar M-Sport World Rally Team	174
4	(United Kingdom) Qatar World Rally Team	163
5	(France) Abu Dhabi Citroën Total WRT	63
