= 2013 Wales Rally GB =

Rally car race

2013 Wales Rally GB 69th Wales Rally GB
Round 13 of the 2013 World Rally Championship
← Previous event
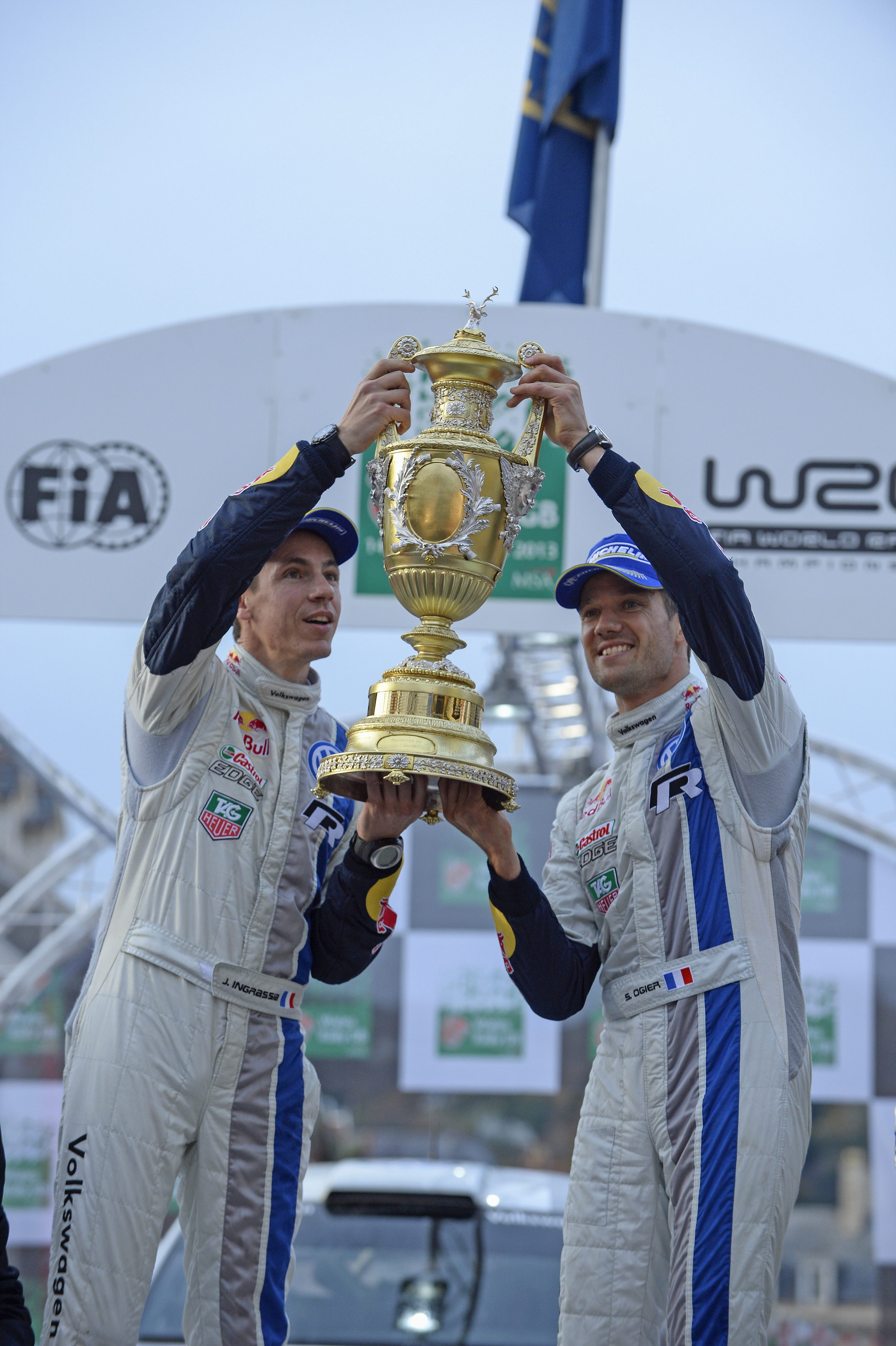
- Sébastien Ogier & Julien Ingrassia after the rally win
- Host country: United Kingdom
- Rally base: Llandudno, Wales
- Dates run: 14 – 17 November 2013
- Stages: 22 (311.15 km; 193.34 miles)
- Stage surface: Gravel

Statistics
- Crews: 44 at finish

Overall results
- Overall winner: (France) Sébastien Ogier (Germany) Volkswagen Motorsport

The 69th Wales Rally GB was the thirteenth and final round of the 2013 World Rally Championship season and was held between 14 and 17 November 2013. This was the year the base of the rally moved from south to north Wales.

2013 World Rally Champion Sébastien Ogier took his first Wales Rally GB victory alongside Julien Ingrassia in the VW Polo R WRC. Previous winner Jari-Matti Latvala finished 2nd, also in a VW Polo WRC whilst Belgian Thierry Neuville finished off the podium. Local Welshman Elfyn Evans won the WRC2 category, French driver Quentin Gilbert won class 5 in the Citroen DS3 R3 and teenager Chris Ingram took the class 6 victory.

Conwy Castle was the start and Llandudno the finish point for the rally, while the service area was based in Deeside for the first time. New stages in North Wales were used such as Gwydyr and Chirk Castle.

== Results ==
=== Event standings ===
Pos.	Driver	Co-driver	Car	Time	Difference
Overall
1.	(France) Sébastien Ogier	(France) Julien Ingrassia	Volkswagen Polo R WRC	3:03:36.7	
2.	(Finland) Jari-Matti Latvala	(Finland) Miikka Anttila	Volkswagen Polo R WRC	3:03:58.5	21.8
3.	(Belgium) Thierry Neuville	(Belgium) Nicolas Gilsoul	Ford Fiesta RS WRC	3:05:01.2	1:24.5
4.	(Norway) Mads Østberg	(Sweden) Jonas Andersson	Ford Fiesta RS WRC	3:05:24.9	1:48.2
5.	(Norway) Andreas Mikkelsen	(Finland) Mikko Markkula	Volkswagen Polo R WRC	3:05:40.1	2:03.4
6.	(Czech Republic) Martin Prokop	(Czech Republic) Michal Ernst	Ford Fiesta RS WRC	3:11:14.2	7:37.5
7.	(Spain) Dani Sordo	(Spain) Carlos del Barrio	Citroën DS3 WRC	3:12:03.6	8:26.9
8.	(United Kingdom) Elfyn Evans	(United Kingdom) Daniel Barritt	Ford Fiesta R5	3:14:49.8	11:13.1
9.	(Finland) Jari Ketomaa	(Finland) Tapio Suominen	Ford Fiesta R5	3:15.52.9	12:16.2
10.	(United Kingdom) Mark Higgins	(United Kingdom) Carl Williamson	Ford Fiesta R5	3:16:57.7	13:21.0
WRC-2
1.	(United Kingdom) Elfyn Evans	(United Kingdom) Daniel Barritt	Ford Fiesta R5	3:14:49.8	
2.	(Finland) Jari Ketomaa	(Finland) Tapio Suominen	Ford Fiesta R5	3:15.52.9	1:03.1
3.	(United Kingdom) Mark Higgins	(United Kingdom) Carl Williamson	Ford Fiesta R5	3:16:57.7	2:07.9
4.	(Norway) Eyvind Brynildsen	(France) Denis Giraudet	Ford Fiesta R5	3:19:36.5	4:46.7
5.	(United Kingdom) Tom Cave	(United Kingdom) Ieuan Thomas	Ford Fiesta R5	3:21:58.0	7:08.2
WRC-3
1.	(Finland) Jukka Korhonen	(Finland) Marko Salminen	Citroën DS3 R3T	3:48:32.7	
2.	(Republic of Ireland) Keith Cronin	(United Kingdom) Marshall Clarke	Citroën DS3 R3T	3:56:14.3	7:41.6

=== Special Stages ===
Leg	Stage	Time	Name	Length	Winner	Time	Avg. spd.
Leg 1 (14 Nov)	SS1	19:05	Gwydyr	6.95 km	(France) Sébastien Ogier	4:31.1	88.4 km/h
Leg 1 (14 Nov)	SS2	19:38	Penmachno	9.28 km	(France) Sébastien Ogier	5:18.9	104.8 km/h
Leg 1 (14 Nov)	SS3	20:42	Clocaenog 1	7.52 km	(Belgium) Thierry Neuville	4:25.9	101.8 km/h
Leg 2 (15 Nov)	SS4	06:30	Hafren 1	32.14 km	(France) Sébastien Ogier	18:41.0	103.2 km/h
Leg 2 (15 Nov)	SS5	10:20	Sweet Lamb 1	4.26 km	(Spain) Dani Sordo	2:54.7	87.8 km/h
Leg 2 (15 Nov)	SS6	10:37	Myherin 1	32.13 km	(Finland) Jari-Matti Latvala	18:16.0	105.5 km/h
Leg 2 (15 Nov)	SS7	13:43	Hafren 2	32.14 km	(France) Sébastien Ogier	18:57.8	101.7 km/h
Leg 2 (15 Nov)	SS8	14:26	Sweet Lamb 2	4.26 km	(France) Sébastien Ogier	2:56.8	86.7 km/h
Leg 2 (15 Nov)	SS9	13:43	Myherin 2	32.13 km	(France) Sébastien Ogier	18:27.6	104.4 km/h
Leg 3 (16 Nov)	SS10	06:00	Gartheiniog 1	14.58 km	(Norway) Andreas Mikkelsen	8:46.5	99.7 km/h
Leg 3 (16 Nov)	SS11	08:29	Dyfi 1	21.9 km	(Norway) Andreas Mikkelsen	12:51.1	102.2km/h
Leg 3 (16 Nov)	SS12	10:33	Gartheiniog 2	14.58 km	(Finland) Jari-Matti Latvala	8:47.8	99.4 km/h
Leg 3 (16 Nov)	SS13	11:02	Dyfi 2	21.9 km	(Finland) Jari-Matti Latvala	12:54.5	101.8 km/h
Leg 3 (16 Nov)	SS14	12:45	Dyfnant 1	21.34 km	(Finland) Jari-Matti Latvala	12:21.1	103.7 km/h
Leg 3 (16 Nov)	SS15	14:22	Chirk Castle 1	2.06 km	(Spain) Dani Sordo	1:31.3	81.2 km/h
Leg 3 (16 Nov)	SS16	14:34	Chirk Castle 2	2.06 km	(Belgium) Thierry Neuville	1:34.2	78.7 km/h
Leg 4 (17 Nov)	SS17	06:30	Dyfnant 2	21.34 km	(France) Sébastien Ogier	12:22.8	103.4 km/h
Leg 4 (17 Nov)	SS18	09:56	Penllyn	14.12 km	(Norway) Mads Østberg	7:15.1	116.8 km/h
Leg 4 (17 Nov)	SS19	11:06	Clocaenog 2 (Power Stage)	7.52 km	(Belgium) Thierry Neuville	4:18.0	104.9 km/h
Leg 4 (17 Nov)	SS20	12:03	Kinmel Park 1	2.18 km	(France) Sébastien Ogier	1:33.2	84.2 km/h
Leg 4 (17 Nov)	SS21	12:11	Kinmel Park 2	2.18 km	(France) Sébastien Ogier	1:32.0	85.3 km/h
Leg 4 (17 Nov)	SS22	13:01	Great Orme	4.58 km	(Finland) Jari-Matti Latvala	2:38.5	104.0 km/h

=== Power Stage ===
The "Power Stage" was a 7.52 km stage, SS19.

Pos	Driver	Car	Time	Diff.	Pts.
1	(Belgium) Thierry Neuville	Ford Fiesta RS WRC	4:18.0	0.0	3
2	(Russia) Evgeniy Novikov	Ford Fiesta RS WRC	4:18.5	+0.5	2
3	(Norway) Mads Østberg	Ford Fiesta RS WRC	4:18.5	+0.5	1

Previous event: 2013 Rally Catalunya	FIA World Rally Championship, 2013 season	Next event: —
Previous year: 2012 Wales Rally GB	Wales Rally GB	Next year: 2014 Wales Rally GB
