= Mattias Therman =

Finnish businessman and rally driver (born 1974)

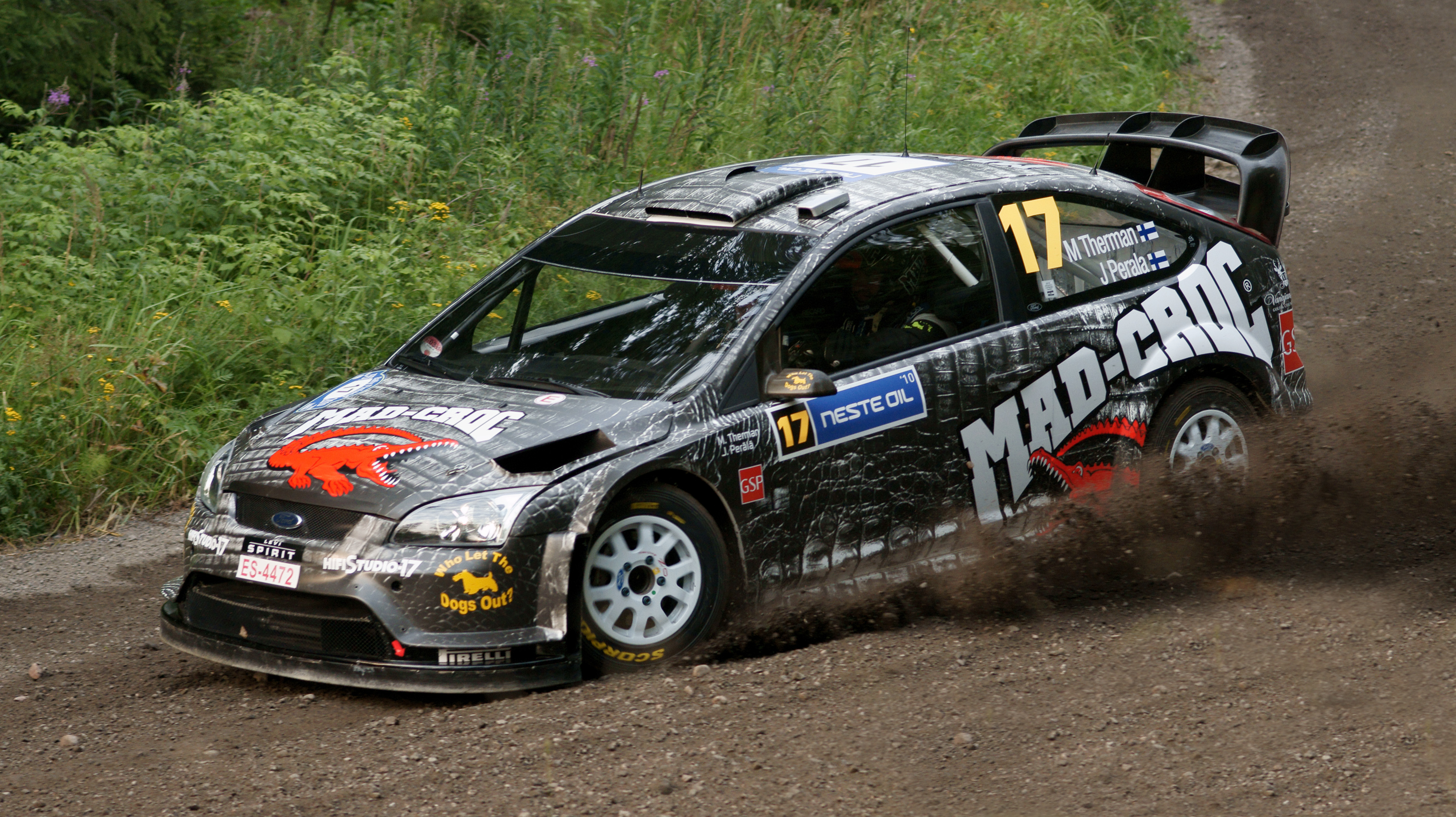

Personal information
- Nationality: (Finland) Finnish

World Rally Championship record
- Years active: 2008-2012
- Co-driver: (Finland) Janne Perala (Finland) Jarkko Kalliolepo
- Teams: Matthias Therman; Munchi's Ford World Rally Team; Stobart M-Sport Ford Rally Team
- Rallies: 9
- First rally: 2008 Rally GB
- Last rally: 2012 Rally Finland

Mattias Kristoffer Therman (born 10 April 1974) is a Finnish businessman and rally driver. He was an owner of Hartwall beverage company and in 2008 he earned more capital gains (over 28 million €) than anyone else in Finland.

== Rally career ==
Therman's rallying career began as a co-driver in 2007. In 2008 he began driving in his first events in his native Finland, and competed in Wales Rally GB at the end of the year, finishing 25th overall. In 2009 he established Team Therminator, and competed on Rally Finland, entered under the Munchi's Ford World Rally Team banner in a Ford Focus RS WRC 08, finishing 15th overall.

In December 2009 it was announced that Marcus Grönholm would return to the World Rally Championship on the 2010 Rally Sweden driving a Focus WRC for Team Therminator alongside Therman. Nearer the event the pair were brought under the Stobart Ford World Rally Team banner, with Gronholm registered to score manufacturer points for the squad. Gronholm and Therman finished 21st and 24th respectively. For Rally Finland Juha Kankkunen will join Therman racing under the Stobart banner.

== WRC results ==
Year	Entrant	Car	1	2	3	4	5	6	7	8	9	10	11	12	13	14	15	WDC	Points
2008	Matthias Therman	Mitsubishi Lancer Evolution IX	MON	SWE	MEX	ARG	JOR	ITA	GRE	TUR	FIN	GER	NZL	ESP	FRA	JPN	GBR; 25	NC	0
2009	Munchi's Ford World Rally Team	Ford Focus RS WRC 08	IRE	NOR	CYP	POR	ARG	ITA	GRE	POL	FIN; 15	AUS	ESP					NC	0
2009	Matthias Therman	Mitsubishi Lancer Evolution X												GBR; 18				NC	0
2010	Stobart M-Sport Ford Rally Team	Ford Focus RS WRC 08	SWE; 24	MEX	JOR	TUR	NZL	POR	BUL	FIN; 14								NC	0
2010	Matthias Therman	Mitsubishi Lancer Evolution X									GER	JPN	FRA	ESP	GBR; Ret			NC	0
2011	Matthias Therman	Mini John Cooper Works WRC	SWE	MEX	POR	JOR	ITA	ARG	GRE	FIN; 62	GER	AUS	FRA	ESP				NC	0
2011	Matthias Therman	Mitsubishi Lancer Evo X R4													GBR; Ret			NC	0
2012	Mattias Therman	Ford Fiesta S2000	MON	SWE	MEX	POR	ARG	GRE	NZL	FIN; Ret	GER	GBR	FRA	ITA	ESP			NC	0
