= Esapekka Lappi =

Finnish former rally driver (born 1991)

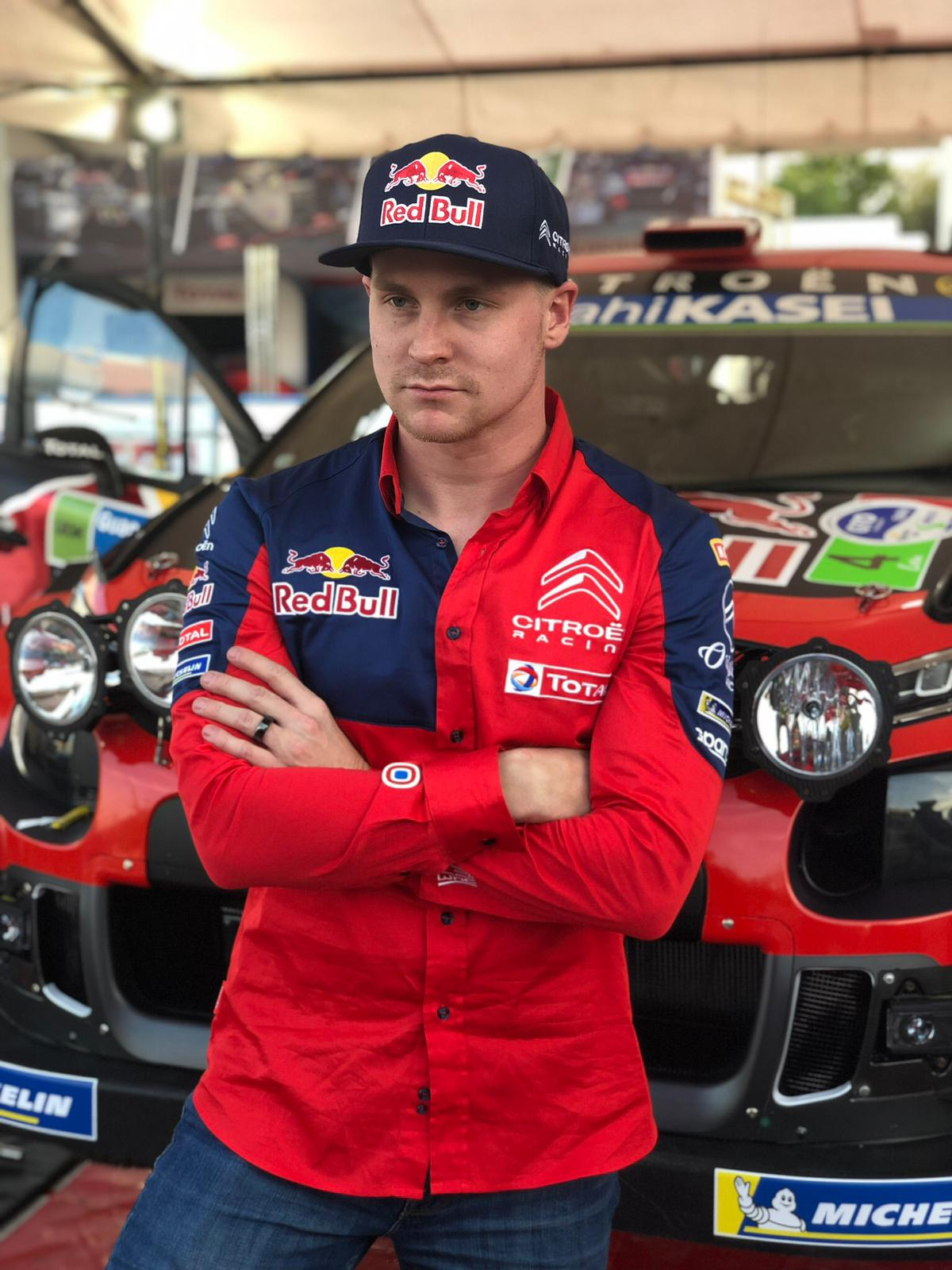
- Lappi at the 2019 Rally Mexico

Personal information
- Nationality: (Finland) Finnish
- Full name: Esapekka Eemeli Lappi
- Born: 17 January 1991 (age 35); Pieksämäki, Finland

World Rally Championship record
- Years active: 2011–2013, 2015–2024, 2026
- Co-driver: (Finland) Janne Ferm (Finland) Enni Mälkönen
- Teams: Škoda, Toyota, Citroën, M-Sport, Hyundai
- Rallies: 90
- Championships: 0
- Rally wins: 2
- Podiums: 15
- Stage wins: 77
- Total points: 570
- First rally: 2011 Rally Finland
- First win: 2017 Rally Finland
- Last win: 2024 Rally Sweden

Esapekka Eemeli Lappi (Finnish pronunciation: [ˈesɑˌpekːɑ ˈlɑpːi]; born 17 January 1991) is a Finnish former rally driver. He is the 2014 European Rally Champion and the 2016 WRC-2 Champion. Lappi is also three-time Finnish Rally Champion winning it in 2012, 2025 and 2026. He drove lately for Hyundai Motorsport in 2026. In 2024, he won his second ever event in Rally Sweden, which broke the record for the longest gap between wins in terms of time and number of rallies (81 rallies), with his debut win coming from his home event in 2017 Rally Finland. Lappi announced his retirement from professional rallying after the 2026 season.

== Career ==
=== 2012 ===
Lappi won the 2012 Finnish Rally Championship with Ford Fiesta S2000 winning all the 7 rounds of the championship with his co-driver Janne Ferm.

In October, Lappi was signed by Škoda Motorsport. Lappi won his first rally with the team in 2012 Rally Poland which was part of European Rally Championship, driving a Škoda Fabia S2000.

=== Škoda Motorsport (2013–2016) ===
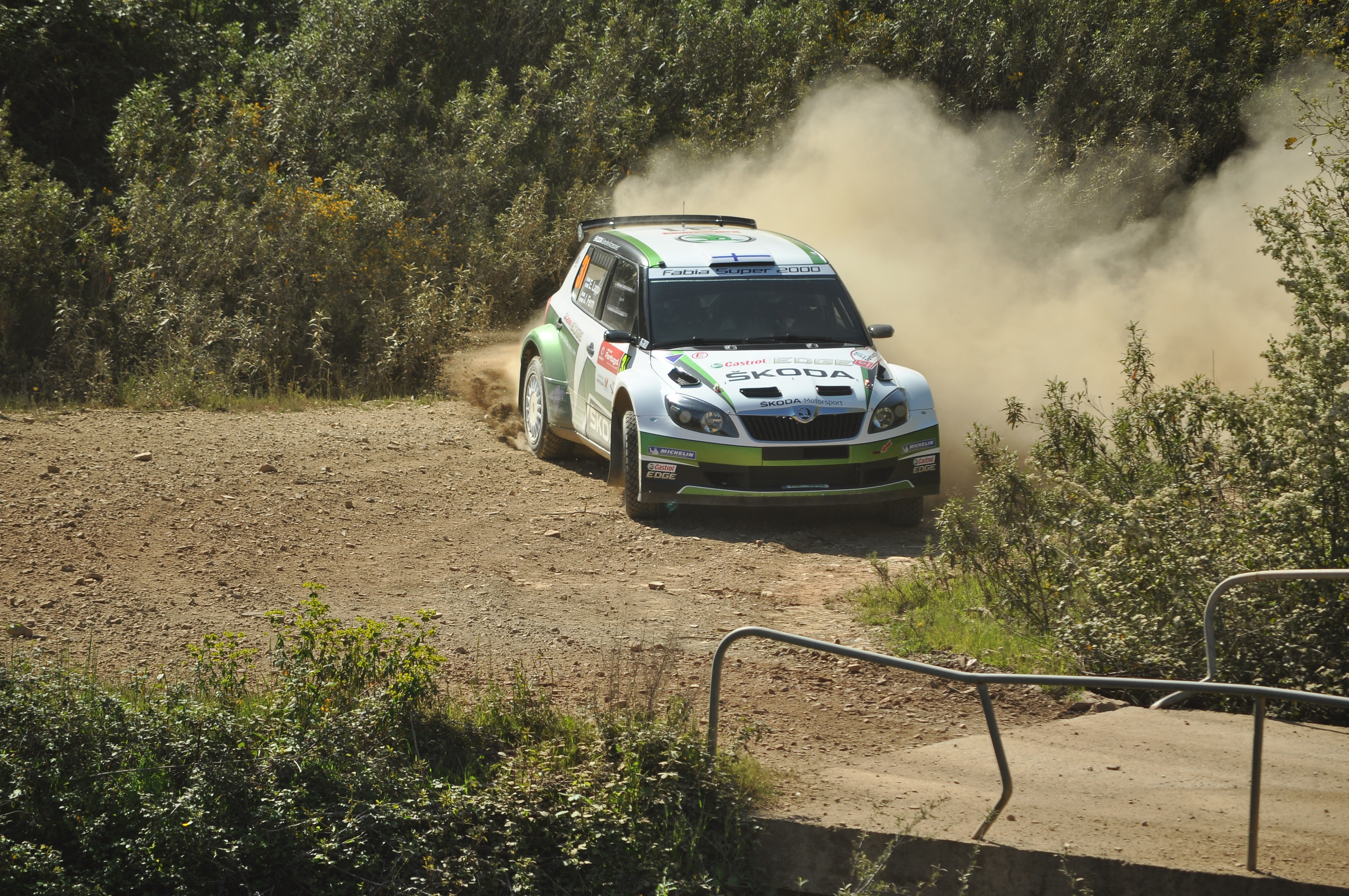
Lappi at 2013 Rally de Portugal.

In 2013, Lappi competed full season in Asia-Pacific Rally Championship with Team MRF's Škoda Fabia S2000, and selected events in both WRC-2 and ERC with Škoda Motorsport. In APRC, Lappi won three out of six events and finished the season runner-up to his team-mate Gaurav Gill.

In ERC, Lappi competed in three tarmac rallies, winning the last of them Rallye International du Valais in Switzerland. He finished the season fifth in the final standings.

In WRC-2, Lappi also raced in three rallies, winning Rally de Portugal where he also scored his maiden WRC-point finishing 10th overall.

Lappi won the 2014 European Rally Championship title with victories in Latvia, Northern Ireland and Switzerland.

Lappi continued competing with Škoda Motorsport driving their new challenger Fabia R5 in WRC-2 championship. He scored two wins in Poland and Finland on his way to finish the season in third place behind Nasser Al-Attiyah and Yuriy Protasov. Lappi also scored his career-best WRC result finishing eighth in Rally Finland.

Lappi won the 2016 World Rally Championship-2 with the Škoda Fabia R5 after winning in Finland, Germany, Wales and Australia.

=== Toyota (2017–2018) ===
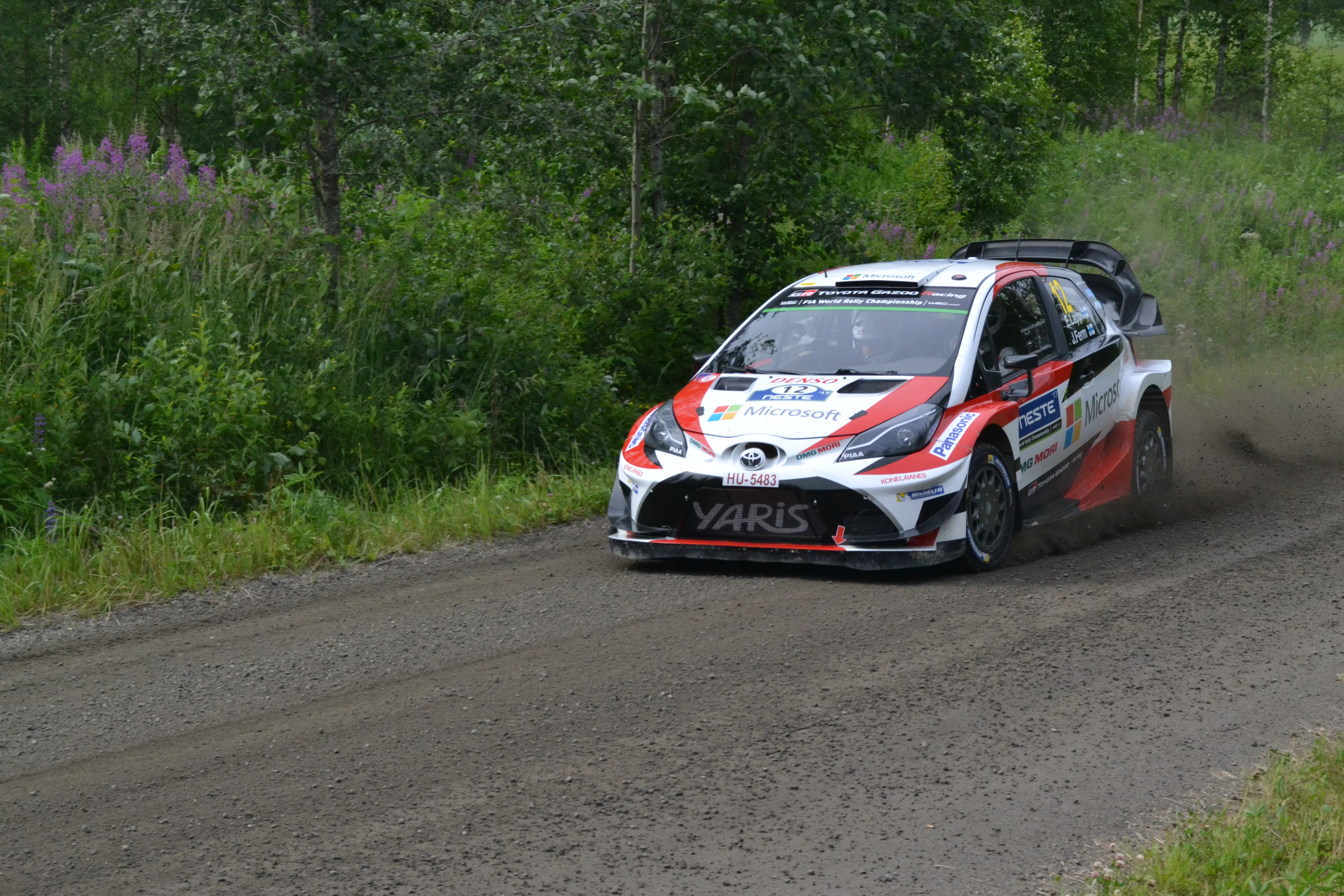
Lappi during Rally Finland 2017, his first WRC victory.

Lappi was signed by Toyota Gazoo Racing to drive a Toyota Yaris WRC in the 2017 World Rally Championship. On his second event with the team, the 2017 Rally d'Italia, he won his first ever stage in the WRC, along with five more stage wins. He eventually finished fourth. In just his fourth World Rally Car start, at his home event of Rally Finland, Lappi took his first WRC victory. In October 2018, Toyota announced that Lappi would leave the team at the end of the 2018 championship.

=== Citroën (2019) ===
Lappi joined Citroën for the 2019 season, partnering with multiple champion Sébastien Ogier. With the Citroën C3 WRC, Lappi finished the season in tenth place after a difficult year with many retirements. He scored three podiums for the French team, by finishing second in Sweden, Finland and Turkey. After the season, Citroën announced they would depart from the World Rally Championship in 2020 after Ogier moved to Lappi's old team, Toyota, leaving Lappi to find a seat elsewhere.

=== M-Sport (2020) ===
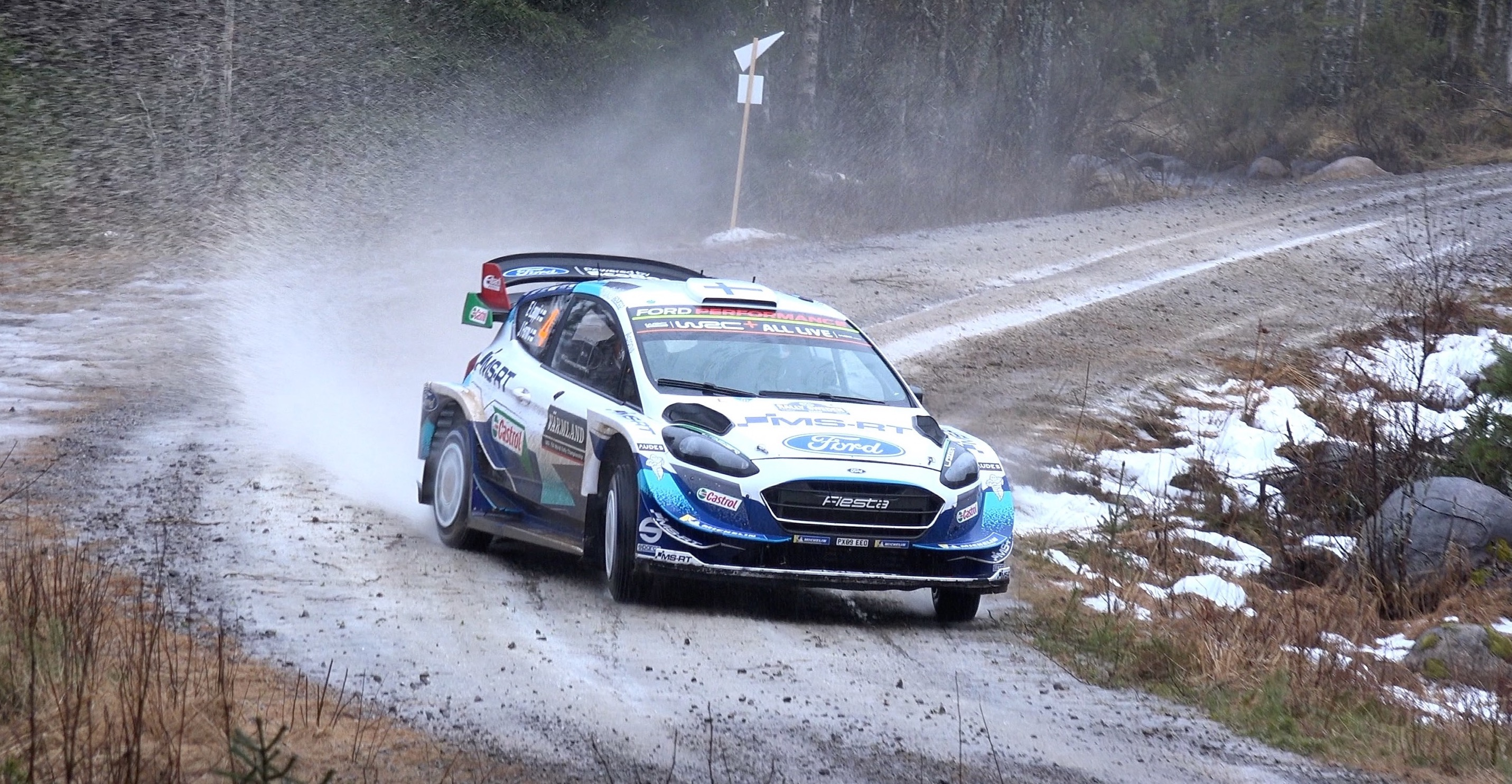
Lappi at 2020 Rally Sweden.

After Citroën's exit in 2019, Lappi signed for M-Sport to drive the whole season in a Ford Fiesta WRC alongside his compatriot Teemu Suninen.

=== Movisport and RTE-Motorsport WRC 2 (2021) ===
In 2021, Lappi drove a Volkswagen Polo GTI for Movistar (rounds 2, 4) and a Toyota Yaris WRC for RTE-Motorsport (round 10) in the WRC 2 championship alongside longtime co-driver Janne Ferm. Of the three rounds he entered, Lappi won two and finished fourth in the third, ending the season in 12th place on points.

=== Toyota (2022) ===
Lappi returned to Toyota Gazoo Racing for the 2022 season in the new hybrid Toyota GR Yaris Rally1, joining drivers Kalle Rovanperä, Elfyn Evans, and Takamoto Katsuta. With co-driver Janne Ferm, Lappi shares the third Toyota car with Sébastien Ogier and his co-driver Benjamin Veillas.

=== Hyundai (2023-2024) ===
At the end of the 2022 season, Lappi signed to Hyundai Motorsport for the 2023 season, meaning he had now driven on behalf of all three major manufacturers in the WRC. Driving a Hyundai i20 N Rally1, he was signed alongside Craig Breen, and now drove alongside Thierry Neuville, Dani Sordo, and Teemu Suninen. The 2023 season was also Lappi's first full-time contract since 2020, with the change to Hyundai being based on the Finn's desire for more regular driving in the championship. Lappi would go on to place in sixth in his maiden Hyundai season, ahead of Takamoto Katsuta and behind Sébastien Ogier. He would podium four different times over the course of the season, placing third at Croatia, Portugal, and Estonia, and placing in second at Sardinia.

Lappi would re-sign with Hyundai again for the 2024 season, although this time on a part-time status and only competing on selected events. It was at Rally Sweden that Lappi earned his second WRC win, placing ahead of Elfyn Evans who finished in second place.

=== 2025 ===
In January 2025, Lappi announced that he would compete in the Finnish Rally Championship's SM1 class with co-driver Enni Mälkönen after his long-term co-driver Janne Ferm retired in 2024. He would go on to take the championship by winning five events in a row.

=== Return to Hyundai (2026) ===
In December 2025, Hyundai announced that Lappi would contest the 2026 WRC season with Mälkönen for the team in a partial campaign, sharing the third car with Hayden Paddon and Dani Sordo. The crew participated in five rounds and finished fourth overall at the Safari Rally. In addition, Lappi and Mälkönen also continued competing the Finnish Rally Championship and successfully defended the title in the penultimate round at Kitee.

In September 2026, Lappi announced his decision to retire from rallying after Championship's last round at Porvoo, citing family reasons.

== Personal life ==
Lappi married his long-time partner Pinja Mökkönen in April 2025. The couple has three children and reside in their hometown Pieksämäki.

Lappi is gluten intolerant. The Citroën service park chef prepares gluten-free dishes for him. One of his sponsors is Moilas, a Finnish producer of gluten-free foods.

== WRC victories ==
#	Event	Season	Co-driver	Car
1	67th Rally Finland	2017	(Finland) Janne Ferm	Toyota Yaris WRC
2	Rally Sweden	2024	(Finland) Janne Ferm	Hyundai i20 N Rally1

== Career results ==
=== WRC results ===
Year	Entrant	Car	1	2	3	4	5	6	7	8	9	10	11	12	13	14	Pos.	Points
2011	Printsport	Citroën C2 R2	SWE	MEX	POR	JOR	ITA	ARG	GRE	FIN; 32	GER	AUS	FRA	ESP	GBR		NC	0
2012	Printsport	Ford Fiesta S2000	MON	SWE	MEX	POR	ARG	GRE	NZL	FIN; 25							NC	0
2012	Esapekka Lappi	Citroën C2 R2									GER; Ret	GBR	FRA	ITA	ESP		NC	0
2013	Škoda Motorsport	Škoda Fabia S2000	MON; Ret	SWE	MEX	POR; 10	ARG	GRE	ITA								30th	1
2013	Esapekka Lappi	Škoda Fabia S2000								FIN; 31	GER	AUS	FRA	ESP	GBR		30th	1
2015	Škoda Motorsport	Škoda Fabia R5	MON	SWE	MEX	ARG	POR; 12	ITA; 17	POL; 12	FIN; 8	GER; 42	AUS	FRA; 14	ESP; Ret	GBR		20th	4
2016	Esapekka Lappi	Škoda Fabia R5	MON; 9														12th	16
2016	Škoda Motorsport	Škoda Fabia R5		SWE; 12	MEX	ARG	POR	ITA; 21	POL; 14	FIN; 8	GER; 7	CHN; C	FRA	ESP	GBR; 11	AUS; 8	12th	16
2017	Toyota Gazoo Racing WRT	Toyota Yaris WRC	MON	SWE	MEX	FRA	ARG	POR; 10	ITA; 4	POL; Ret	FIN; 1	GER; 21	ESP; Ret	GBR; 9	AUS; 6		11th	62
2018	Toyota Gazoo Racing WRT	Toyota Yaris WRC	MON; 7	SWE; 4	MEX; 11	FRA; 6	ARG; 8	POR; 5	ITA; 3	FIN; Ret	GER; 3	TUR; Ret	GBR; 3	ESP; 7	AUS; 4		5th	126
2019	Citroën Total WRT	Citroën C3 WRC	MON; Ret	SWE; 2	MEX; 13	FRA; 7	ARG; Ret	CHL; 6	POR; Ret	ITA; 7	FIN; 2	GER; 8	TUR; 2	GBR; 27	ESP; Ret	AUS; C	10th	83
2020	M-Sport Ford WRT	Ford Fiesta WRC	MON; 4	SWE; 5	MEX; Ret	EST; 7	TUR; 6	ITA; Ret	MNZ; 4								6th	52
2021	Movisport	Volkswagen Polo GTI R5	MON	ARC; 10	CRO	POR; 7	ITA	KEN	EST	BEL	GRE						12th	22
2021	RTE-Motorsport	Toyota Yaris WRC										FIN; 4	ESP	MNZ			12th	22
2022	Toyota Gazoo Racing WRT	Toyota GR Yaris Rally1	MON	SWE; 3	CRO; 49	POR	ITA; 44	KEN	EST; 6	FIN; 3	BEL; 3	GRE; 22	NZL	ESP	JPN		9th	58
2023	Hyundai Shell Mobis WRT	Hyundai i20 N Rally1	MON; 8	SWE; 7	MEX; Ret	CRO; 3	POR; 3	ITA; 2	KEN; 12	EST; 3	FIN; Ret	GRE; 5	CHL; Ret	EUR; Ret	JPN; 4		6th	113
2024	Hyundai Shell Mobis WRT	Hyundai i20 N Rally1	MON	SWE; 1	KEN; 12	CRO	POR	ITA	POL	LAT; Ret	FIN; 43	GRE	CHL; Ret	EUR	JPN		12th	33
2026	Hyundai Shell Mobis WRT	Hyundai i20 N Rally1	MON	SWE; 6	KEN; 4	CRO	ESP	POR	JPN	GRE	EST; 8	FIN	PAR; Ret	CHL; 6	ITA	SAU; C	10th	33

=== SWRC results ===
Year	Entrant	Car	1	2	3	4	5	6	7	8	Pos.	Points
2012	Printsport	Ford Fiesta S2000	MON	SWE	POR	NZL	FIN; 5	GBR	FRA	ESP	12th	10

=== WRC-2 results ===
Year	Entrant	Car	1	2	3	4	5	6	7	8	9	10	11	12	13	14	Pos.	Points
2013	Škoda Motorsport	Škoda Fabia S2000	MON; Ret	SWE	MEX	POR; 1	ARG	GRE	ITA								16th	25
2013	Esapekka Lappi	Škoda Fabia S2000								FIN; 11	GER	AUS	FRA	ESP	GBR		16th	25
2015	Škoda Motorsport	Škoda Fabia R5	MON	SWE	MEX	ARG	POR; 2	ITA; 9	POL; 1	FIN; 1	GER; 13	AUS	FRA; 2	ESP; Ret	GBR		3rd	88
2016	Škoda Motorsport	Škoda Fabia R5	MON	SWE; 3	MEX	ARG	POR	ITA; 9	POL; 3	FIN; 1	GER; 1	CHN; C	FRA	ESP	GBR; 1	AUS; 1	1st	130
2021	Movisport	Volkswagen Polo GTI R5	MON	ARC; 1	CRO	POR; 1	ITA	KEN	EST	BEL	GRE	FIN	ESP	MNZ			7th	59

=== ERC results ===
Year	Entrant	Car	1	2	3	4	5	6	7	8	9	10	11	12	Pos.	Points
2012	Škoda Motorsport	Škoda Fabia S2000	AUT	ITA	CRO	BUL	BEL	TUR	POR	CZE	ESP	POL; 1	SUI		—	39
2013	Škoda Motorsport	Škoda Fabia S2000	JÄN	LIE	CAN	AZO	COR	YPR	ROM	ZLÍ; Ret	POL	CRO	SAN; 2	VAL; 1	5th	64
2014	Škoda Motorsport	Škoda Fabia S2000	JÄN	LIE; 1	ACR; 4	IRE; 1	AZO	YPR; Ret	EST; 5	CZE; Ret	CYP	VAL; 1	COR; Ret		1st	162

=== APRC results ===
Year	Entrant	Car	1	2	3	4	5	6	Pos.	Points
2013	Team MRF	Škoda Fabia S2000	NZL; 1	NCL; Ret	AUS; 1	MYS; Ret	JPN; Ret	CHN; 1	2nd	117

Sporting positions
Preceded by Jan Kopecký	European Rally Champion; 2014	Succeeded by Kajetan Kajetanowicz
Preceded by Nasser Al-Attiyah	World Rally Championship-2 Champion; 2016	Succeeded by Pontus Tidemand
