= 2012 Rally Finland =

Motor rally competition

2012 Rally Finland 62nd Neste Oil Rally Finland
Round 8 of the 2012 World Rally Championship
| ← Previous event | Next event → |
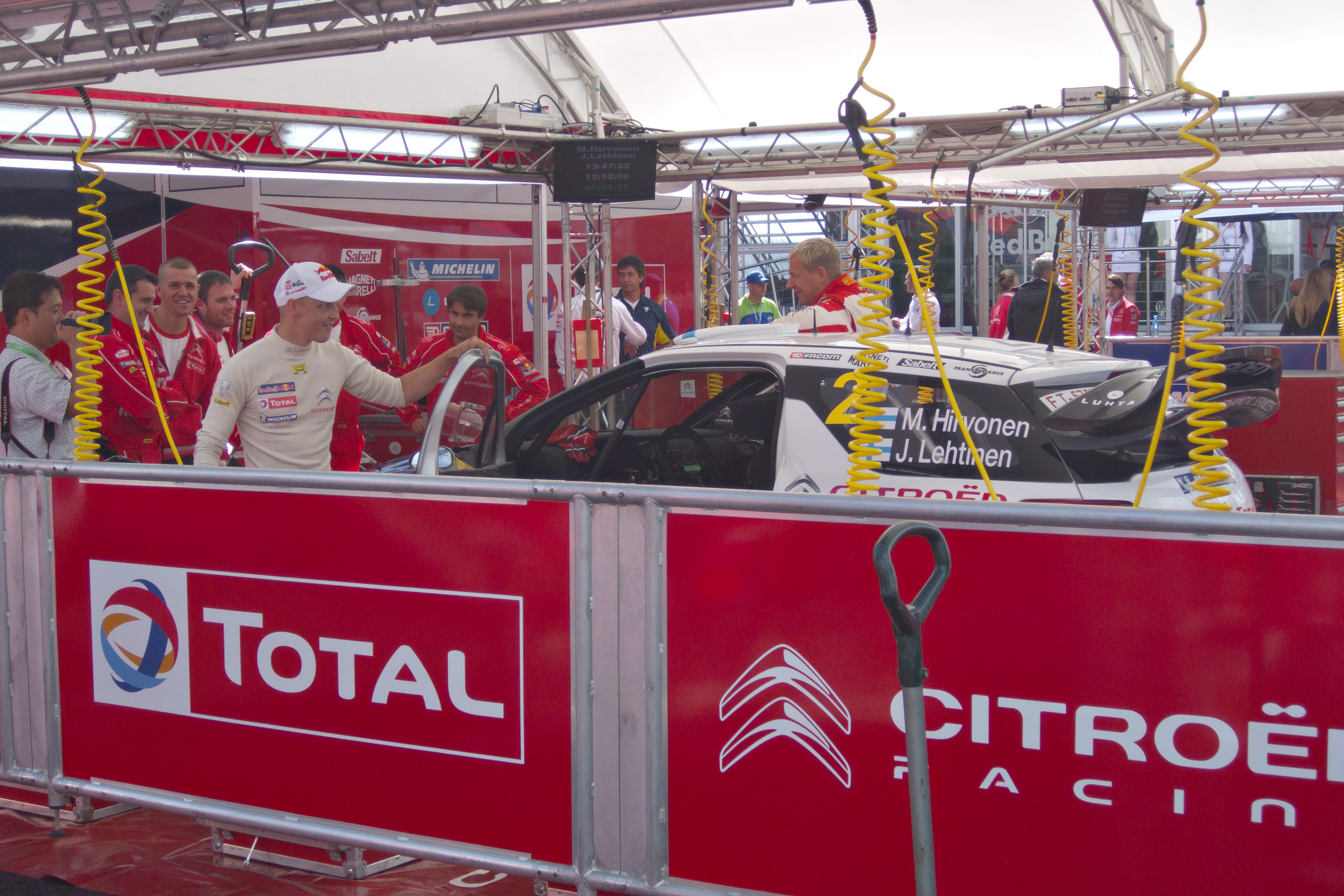
- Mikko Hirvonen joking with his co-driver Jarmo Lehtinen before the start of the rally.
- Host country: Finland
- Rally base: Jyväskylä
- Dates run: 2 – 4 August 2012
- Stages: 18 (303.52 km; 188.60 miles)
- Stage surface: Gravel
- Overall distance: 1,625.69 km (1,010.16 miles)

Statistics
- Crews: 81 at start, 53 at finish

Overall results
- Overall winner: (France) Sébastien Loeb (France) Citroën Total World Rally Team

The 62nd Neste Oil Rally Finland was the eighth round of the 2012 World Rally Championship season and was held between 2 and 4 August 2012. In a similar manner to the previous year, the rally was based in Jyväskylä with a super special stage held at Jokimaa, Lahti.

The rally was also the fifth round of the Super 2000 World Rally Championship and the third round of the WRC Academy.

== Entry list ==
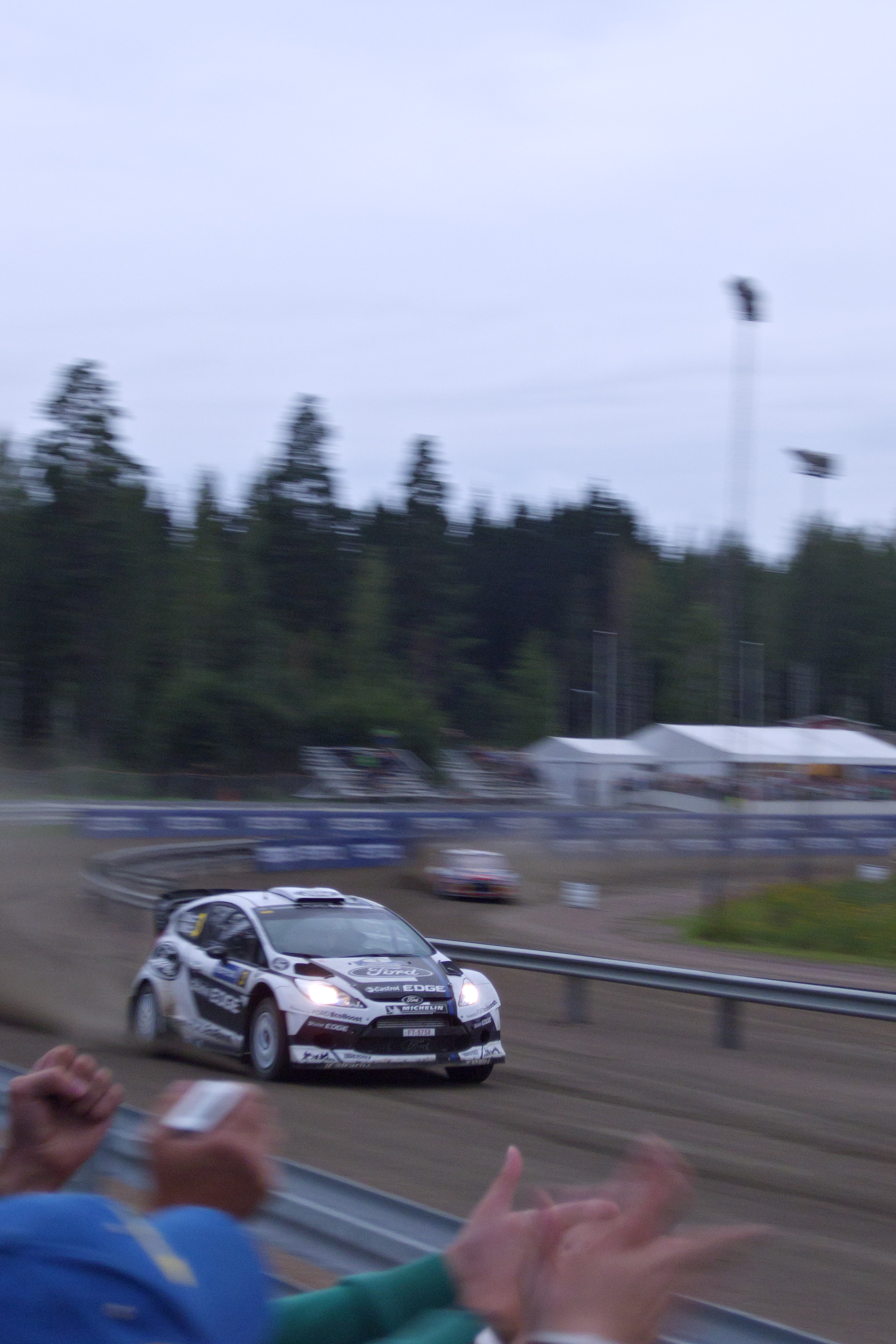
Jari-Matti Latvala going against Sébastien Loeb at SS12 SSS Killeri.

The entry list saw a total of 86 entries, 81 of which started.

- Note: The bolded entrants were eligible to score points for Manufactures' championship.

| No. | Driver | Co-driver | Car | Entrant | Class | Priority | Championship |
|---|---|---|---|---|---|---|---|
| 1 | (France) Sébastien Loeb | (Monaco) Daniel Elena | Citroën DS3 WRC | (France) **Citroën Total World Rally Team** | WRC | 1 | |
| 2 | (Finland) Mikko Hirvonen | (Finland) Jarmo Lehtinen | Citroën DS3 WRC | (France) **Citroën Total World Rally Team** | WRC | 1 | |
| 3 | (Finland) Jari-Matti Latvala | (Finland) Miikka Anttila | Ford Fiesta RS WRC | (United Kingdom) **Ford World Rally Team** | WRC | 1 | |
| 4 | (Norway) Petter Solberg | (United Kingdom) Chris Patterson | Ford Fiesta RS WRC | (United Kingdom) **Ford World Rally Team** | WRC | 1 | |
| 5 | (Estonia) Ott Tänak | (Estonia) Kuldar Sikk | Ford Fiesta RS WRC | (United Kingdom) **M-Sport Ford World Rally Team** | WRC | 1 | |
| 6 | (Russia) Evgeny Novikov | (France) Denis Giraudet | Ford Fiesta RS WRC | (United Kingdom) **M-Sport Ford World Rally Team** | WRC | 1 | |
| 7 | (Australia) Chris Atkinson | (Belgium) Stéphane Prévot | Citroën DS3 WRC | **Qatar World Rally Team** | WRC | 1 | |
| 8 | (Belgium) Thierry Neuville | (Belgium) Nicolas Gilsoul | Citroën DS3 WRC | (France) **Citroën Junior World Rally Team** | WRC | 1 | |
| 10 | (Norway) Mads Østberg | (Sweden) Jonas Andersson | Ford Fiesta RS WRC | (Norway) **Adapta World Rally Team** | WRC | 1 | |
| 12 | (Portugal) Armindo Araújo | (Portugal) Miguel Ramalho | Mini John Cooper Works WRC | WRC Team Mini Portugal | WRC | 1 | |
| 14 | (Brazil) Paulo Nobre | (Brazil) Edu Paula | Mini John Cooper Works WRC | WRC Team Mini Portugal | WRC | 1 | |
| 15 | (Czech Republic) Martin Prokop | (Czech Republic) Zdeněk Hrůza | Ford Fiesta RS WRC | (Czech Republic) Czech Ford National Team | WRC | 1 | |
| WD | (Norway) Henning Solberg | (Austria) Ilka Minor | Ford Fiesta RS WRC | | WRC | 1 | |
| 17 | (Finland) Jari Ketomaa | (Finland) Mika Stenberg | Ford Fiesta RS WRC | | WRC | 1 | |
| 18 | (Finland) Matti Rantanen | (Finland) Mikko Lukka | Ford Fiesta RS WRC | | WRC | 1 | |
| 19 | (Finland) Sebastian Lindholm | (Finland) Timo Hantunen | Ford Fiesta RS WRC | | WRC | 2 | |
| 20 | (France) Sébastien Ogier | (France) Julien Ingrassia | Škoda Fabia S2000 | (Germany) Volkswagen Motorsport | 2 | | |
| 21 | (Norway) Andreas Mikkelsen | (Norway) Ola Fløene | Škoda Fabia S2000 | (Germany) Volkswagen Motorsport | 2 | | |
| 31 | (New Zealand) Hayden Paddon | (New Zealand) John Kennard | Škoda Fabia S2000 | | 2 | 3 | SWRC |
| 32 | (Republic of Ireland) Craig Breen | (Republic of Ireland) Paul Nagle | Ford Fiesta S2000 | | 2 | 3 | SWRC |
| 33 | (Sweden) Per-Gunnar Andersson | (Sweden) Emil Axelsson | Proton Satria Neo S2000 | (Malaysia) Proton Motorsports | 2 | 3 | SWRC |
| 34 | (Finland) Juha Salo | (Finland) Marko Salminen | Proton Satria Neo S2000 | (Malaysia) Proton Motorsports | 2 | 3 | SWRC |
| 35 | (Poland) Maciej Oleksowicz | (Poland) Andrzej Obrebowski | Ford Fiesta S2000 | | 2 | 3 | SWRC |
| 36 | (Saudi Arabia) Yazeed Al-Rajhi | (United Kingdom) Michael Orr | Ford Fiesta RRC | (Saudi Arabia) Yazeed Racing | 2 | 3 | SWRC |
| 43 | (United States) Ken Block | (Italy) Alex Gelsomino | Ford Fiesta RS WRC | (United States) Monster World Rally Team | WRC | 1 | |
| 49 | (Finland) Esapekka Lappi | (Finland) Janne Ferm | Ford Fiesta S2000 | (Finland) Printsport | 2 | 3 | SWRC |
| WD | (Finland) Mikko Pajunen | (Finland) Kaj Lindström | Subaru Impreza WRX STI R4 | | 2 | 3 | SWRC |
| 51 | (Finland) Jarkko Nikara | (Finland) Petri Nikara | Mitsubishi Lancer Evolution IX | | 3 | | |
| 52 | (Finland) Jukka Ketomäki | (Finland) Kai Risberg | Mitsubishi Lancer Evolution X | | 3 | | |
| 53 | (Finland) Riku Tahko | (Finland) Markus Soininen | Mini John Cooper Works WRC | | WRC | 2 | |
| 54 | (Estonia) Karl Kruuda | (Estonia) Martin Järveoja | Ford Fiesta S2000 | | 2 | | |
| 55 | (Estonia) Sander Pärn | (Estonia) Ken Järveoja | Subaru Impreza WRX STI | | 3 | | |
| 56 | (Finland) Mattias Therman | (Finland) Jarkko Kalliolepo | Ford Fiesta S2000 | | 2 | | |
| 57 | (Finland) Kari Hämäläinen | (Finland) Risto Pietiläinen | Ford Fiesta S2000 | | 2 | | |
| 58 | (Finland) Tuomas Skantz | (Finland) Jani Rauhala | Mitsubishi Lancer Evolution X | | 3 | | |
| 59 | (Russia) Radik Shaymiev | (Russia) Maxim Tsvetkov | Peugeot 207 S2000 | | 2 | | |
| 60 | (Italy) Edoardo Bresolin | (Italy) Rudy Pollet | Ford Fiesta RRC | | 2 | | |
| 61 | (Poland) Krzysztof Oleksowicz | (Poland) Krzysztof Geborys | Subaru Impreza WRX STI R4 | | 2 | | |
| 62 | (Ukraine) Oleksiy Tamrazov | (Italy) Nicola Arena | Ford Fiesta S2000 | | 2 | | |
| 63 | (Finland) Matias Kauppinen | (Finland) Jonne Halttunen | Subaru Impreza WRX STI | | 3 | | |
| 64 | (Netherlands) Kees Burger | (Finland) Miika Teiskonen | Subaru Impreza WRX STI | | 3 | | |
| 65 | (Finland) Jukka Korhonen | (Finland) Mikael Korhonen | Ford Fiesta R2 | (Finland) Printsport | 6 | | |
| 66 | (Finland) Andreas Amberg | (Finland) Matti Heikkinen | Ford Fiesta R2 | | 6 | | |
| 67 | (Norway) Frank Tore Larsen | (Norway) Torstein Eriksen | Ford Fiesta R2 | | 6 | | |
| 68 | (Finland) Kristian Yritys | (Finland) Janne Siirilä | Renault Clio R3 | | 5 | | |
| WD | (Finland) Juho Annala | (Finland) Tuukka Shemeikka | Citroën C2 R2 | | 6 | | |
| 70 | (France) Vincent Dubert | (France) Valentin Sarreaud | Citroën DS3 R3T | | 5 | | |
| 71 | (Finland) Tomi Weurlander | (Finland) Pasi Nurmi | Subaru Impreza WRX STI | | 3 | | |
| 72 | (Finland) Jouni Virtanen | (Finland) Petteri Luostarinen | Subaru Impreza WRX STI | | 3 | | |
| 73 | (Finland) Ari Saxberg | (Finland) Pekka Leppälä | Mitsubishi Lancer Evolution X | | 3 | | |
| 74 | (Finland) Pasi Matsi | (Finland) Hannu Lamminen | Renault Clio R3 | | 5 | | |
| 75 | (Ukraine) Yuriy Protasov | (Ukraine) Kyrylo Nesvit | Citroën DS3 R3T | | 5 | | |
| 76 | (Finland) Niko-Pekka Nieminen | (Finland) Pasi Haataja | Ford Fiesta R2 | | 6 | | |
| 77 | (Finland) Petri Itkonen | (Estonia) Janno Older | Citroën C2 R2 | | 6 | | |
| 78 | (Finland) Sami Sarjula | (Finland) Teemu Horkama | Ford Fiesta R2 | | 6 | | |
| 79 | (Slovakia) Martin Koči | (Czech Republic) Lukáš Zámečník | Citroën C2 R2 | | 6 | | |
| 80 | (Finland) Niko Veikkanen | (Finland) Joni-Petteri Virtanen | Honda Civic Type R | | 8 | | |
| 81 | (Ukraine) Yukhym Vazheyevskyy | (Ukraine) Yevgen Kochkovyy | Citroën DS3 R3T | | 5 | | |
| 82 | (Australia) Molly Taylor | (United Kingdom) Sebastian Marshall | Citroën DS3 R3T | (Italy) United Rally Management | 5 | | |
| 83 | (Finland) Kristian Kiviniemi | (Finland) Asko Sairanen | Citroën C2 R2 | | 6 | | |
| 84 | (Finland) Kari Hytönen | (Finland) Ada Herranen | Ford Fiesta R2 | | 6 | | |
| 85 | (Finland) Ilkka Kariste | (Finland) Mikael Lindberg | Ford Fiesta ST | | 8 | | |
| 86 | (Italy) Fabrizio de Sanctis | (Italy) “Bombolino” | Mitsubishi Lancer Evolution IX | | 3 | | |
| 87 | (France) Lilian Vialle | (France) Patrice Roissac | Renault Clio R3 | | 5 | | |
| 88 | (Italy) Massimiliano Settembrini | (Italy) Corrado Bonato | Citroën DS3 R3T | | 5 | | |
| 89 | (Spain) Nil Solans | (Spain) Miquel Angel Ibañez | Ford Fiesta R2 | | 6 | | |
| 90 | (France) Marc Amourette | (France) Gwenola Marie | Citroën DS3 R3T | | 5 | | |
| 91 | (France) Sebastien Chardonnet | (France) Thibault de la Hayhe | Citroën DS3 R3T | | 5 | | |
| WD | (Switzerland) Federico Della Casa | (Italy) Marco Menchini | Citroën DS3 R3T | | 5 | | |
| WD | (Finland) Raimo Kaisanlahti | (Finland) Mikko Kaikkonen | Ford Fiesta R2 | | 6 | | |
| 94 | (Finland) Simo-Petteri Tuunanen | (Finland) Mika Heinonen | Citroën Saxo VTS | | 9 | | |
| 95 | (Finland) Ilkka Pastila | (Finland) Pasi Riihiaho | Citroën Saxo VTS | | 9 | | |
| 96 | (France) Eddy Brisson | (France) Kévin Masson | Suzuki Swift | | 9 | | |
| 97 | (Belgium) Renaud Bronkart | (Luxembourg) Martine Victor | Toyota Yaris | | 10 | | |
| 98 | (Finland) Joonas Lindroos | (Finland) Pasi Kilpeläinen | Citroën C2 R2 | | 6 | | |
| 101 | (United States) Christopher Duplessis | (United States) Alexander Kihurani | Ford Fiesta R2 | | 6 | | WRC Academy |
| 102 | (Spain) José Antonio Suárez | (Spain) Cándido Carrera | Ford Fiesta R2 | | 6 | | WRC Academy |
| 103 | (United Kingdom) Alastair Fisher | (United Kingdom) Daniel Barritt | Ford Fiesta R2 | | 6 | | WRC Academy |
| 105 | (Sweden) Pontus Tidemand | (Norway) Stig Rune Skjærmoen | Ford Fiesta R2 | | 6 | | WRC Academy |
| 106 | (Australia) Brendan Reeves | (Australia) Rhianon Smyth | Ford Fiesta R2 | | 6 | | WRC Academy |
| 107 | (Netherlands) Timo van der Marel | (Netherlands) Erwin Berkhof | Ford Fiesta R2 | (Netherlands) KNAF Talent First | 6 | | WRC Academy |
| 108 | (United Kingdom) John MacCrone | (United Kingdom) Stuart Loudon | Ford Fiesta R2 | | 6 | | WRC Academy |
| 109 | (United Kingdom) Elfyn Evans | (United Kingdom) Philip Pugh | Ford Fiesta R2 | | 6 | | WRC Academy |
| 111 | (Portugal) João Silva | (Portugal) Hugo Magalhães | Ford Fiesta R2 | | 6 | | WRC Academy |
| 113 | (South Africa) Ashley Haigh-Smith | (United Kingdom) Craig Parry | Ford Fiesta R2 | | 6 | | WRC Academy |
| 114 | (Sweden) Fredrik Åhlin | (Norway) Morten Erik Abrahamsen | Ford Fiesta R2 | | 6 | | WRC Academy |

== Report ==
Sébastien Loeb won the Rally Finland for the third time in his career. He led the rally from start to finish and was fastest in nine stages.

== Results ==
=== Event standings ===
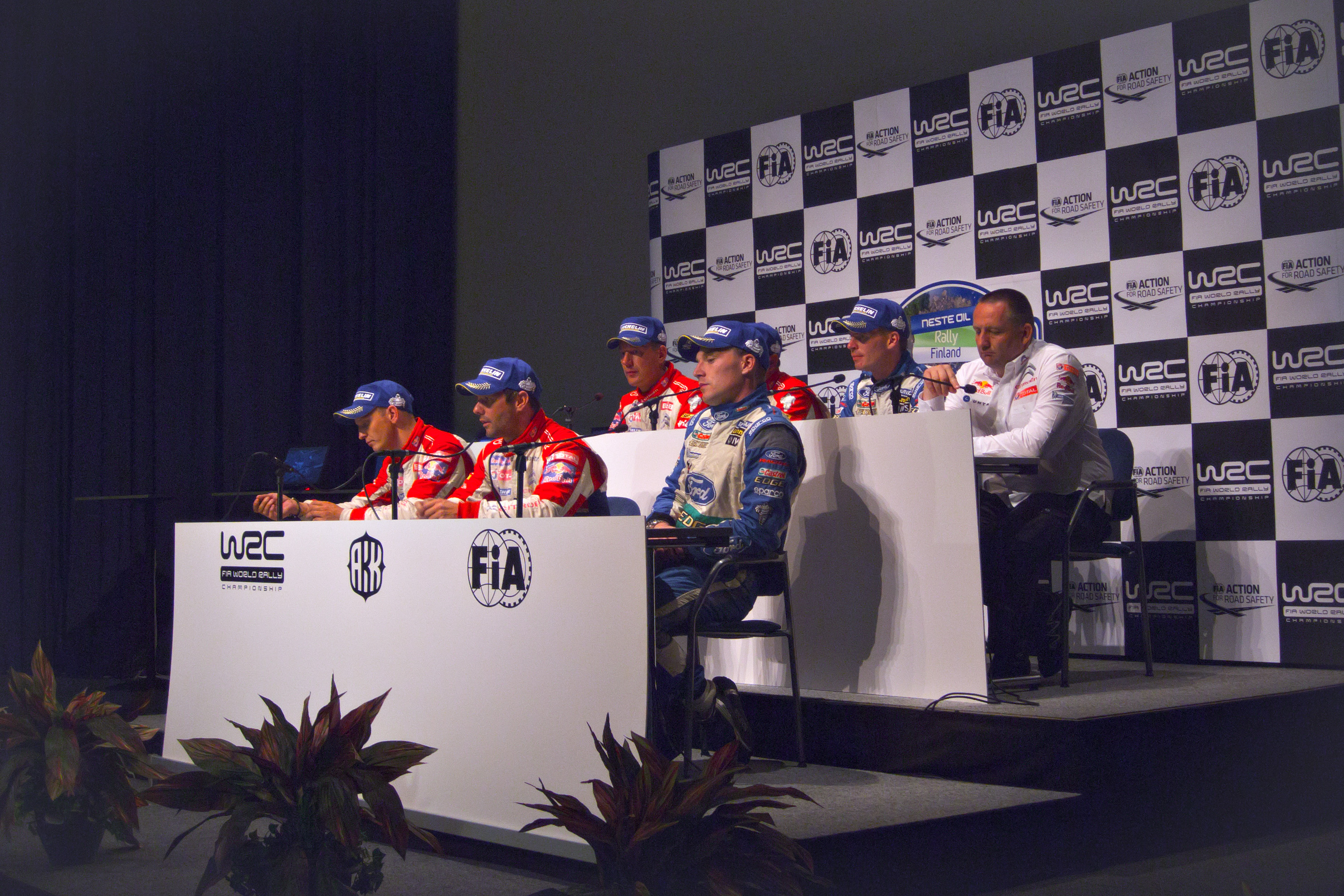
The top three crews at the post-event press conference.

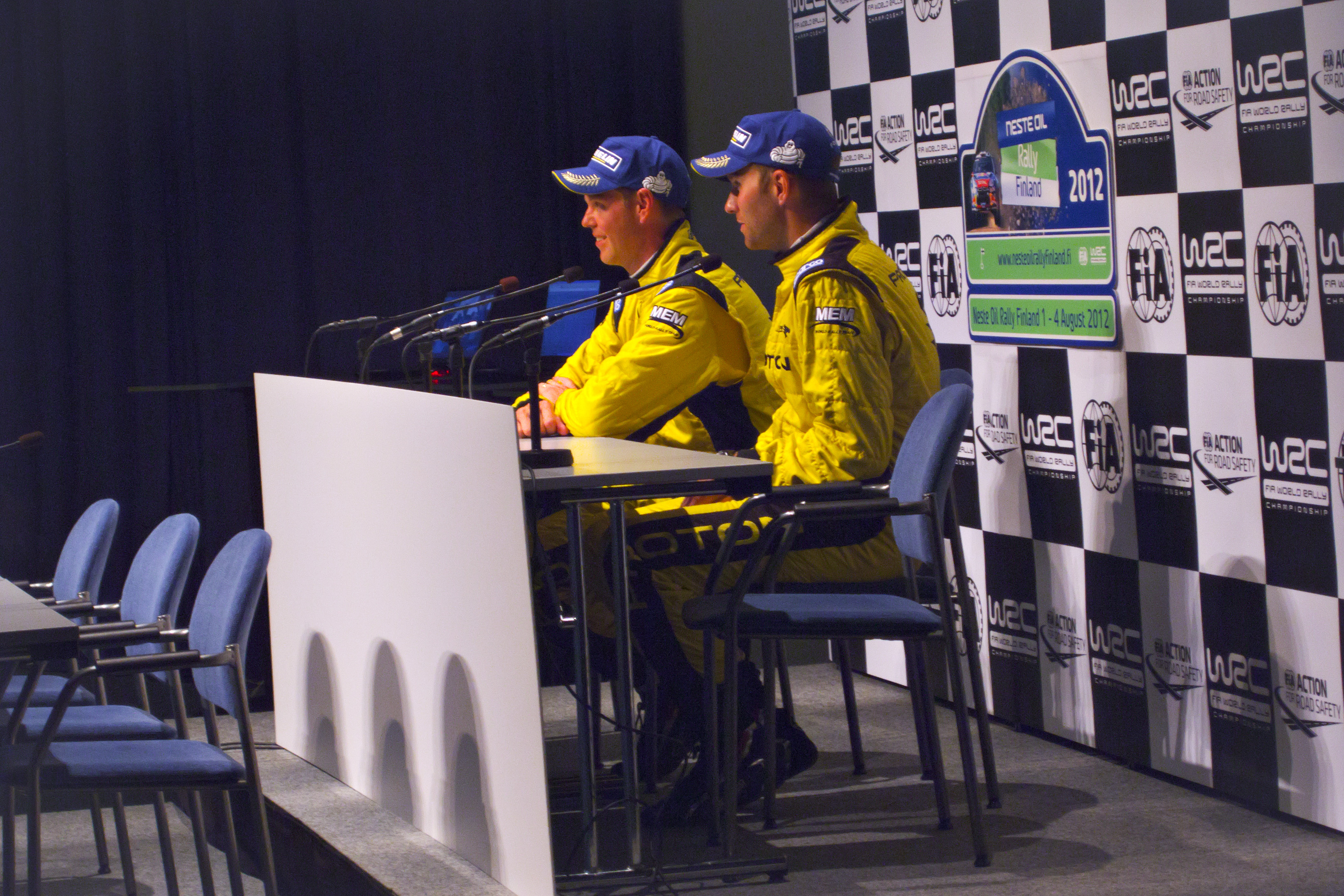
Per-Gunnar Andersson and Emil Axelsson at the post-event press conference.

| Pos. | No. | Driver | Co-driver | Car | Class | Time | Difference | Points |
Overall
| 1 | 1 | (France) Sébastien Loeb | (Monaco) Daniel Elena | Citroën DS3 WRC | WRC | 2:28:11.4 | 0.0 | 26 |
| 2 | 2 | (Finland) Mikko Hirvonen | (Finland) Jarmo Lehtinen | Citroën DS3 WRC | WRC | 2:28:17.5 | 6.1 | 21 |
| 3 | 3 | (Finland) Jari-Matti Latvala | (Finland) Miikka Anttila | Ford Fiesta RS WRC | WRC | 2:28:46.4 | 35.0 | 15 |
| 4 | 4 | (Norway) Petter Solberg | (United Kingdom) Chris Patterson | Ford Fiesta RS WRC | WRC | 2:29:07.5 | 56.1 | 14 |
| 5 | 10 | (Norway) Mads Østberg | (Sweden) Jonas Andersson | Ford Fiesta RS WRC | WRC | 2:30:43.5 | 2:32.1 | 10 |
| 6 | 5 | (Estonia) Ott Tänak | (Estonia) Kuldar Sikk | Ford Fiesta RS WRC | WRC | 2:30:59.0 | 2:47.6 | 8 |
| 7 | 18 | (Finland) Matti Rantanen | (Finland) Mikko Lukka | Ford Fiesta RS WRC | WRC | 2:33:03.1 | 4:51.7 | 6 |
| 8 | 17 | (Finland) Jari Ketomaa | (Finland) Mika Stenberg | Ford Fiesta RS WRC | WRC | 2:34:13.3 | 6:01.9 | 4 |
| 9 | 15 | (Czech Republic) Martin Prokop | (Czech Republic) Zdeněk Hrůza | Ford Fiesta RS WRC | WRC | 2:34:15.7 | 6:04.3 | 2 |
| 10 | 20 | (France) Sébastien Ogier | (France) Julien Ingrassia | Škoda Fabia S2000 | 2 | 2:36:57.4 | 8:46.0 | 1 |
| 11 | 33 | (Sweden) Per-Gunnar Andersson | (Sweden) Emil Axelsson | Proton Satria Neo S2000 | 2 | 2:39:01.2 | 10:49.8 | 0 |
| 12 | 54 | (Estonia) Karl Kruuda | (Estonia) Martin Järveoja | Ford Fiesta S2000 | 2 | 2:39:20.3 | 11:08.9 | 0 |
| 13 | 51 | (Finland) Jarkko Nikara | (Finland) Petri Nikara | Mitsubishi Lancer Evolution IX | 3 | 2:40:43.6 | 12:32.2 | 0 |
| 14 | 19 | (Finland) Sebastian Lindholm | (Finland) Timo Hantunen | Ford Fiesta RS WRC | WRC | 2:40:46.4 | 12:35.0 | 0 |
| 15 | 12 | (Portugal) Armindo Araújo | (Portugal) Miguel Ramalho | Mini John Cooper Works WRC | WRC | 2:40:55.1 | 12:43.7 | 0 |
| 16 | 8 | (Belgium) Thierry Neuville | (Belgium) Nicolas Gilsoul | Citroën DS3 WRC | WRC | 2:41:50.6 | 13:39.2 | 0 |
| 17 | 36 | (Saudi Arabia) Yazeed Al-Rajhi | (United Kingdom) Michael Orr | Ford Fiesta RRC | 2 | 2:42:19.0 | 14:07.6 | 0 |
| 18 | 34 | (Finland) Juha Salo | (Finland) Marko Salminen | Proton Satria Neo S2000 | 2 | 2:44:47.9 | 16:36.5 | 0 |
| 19 | 55 | (Estonia) Sander Pärn | (Estonia) Ken Järveoja | Subaru Impreza WRX STI | 3 | 2:45:15.8 | 17:04.4 | 0 |
| 20 | 60 | (Italy) Edoardo Bresolin | (Italy) Rudy Pollet | Ford Fiesta RRC | 2 | 2:46:38.3 | 18:26.9 | 0 |
| 21 | 59 | (Russia) Radik Shaymiev | (Russia) Maxim Tsvetkov | Peugeot 207 S2000 | 2 | 2:50:15.8 | 22:04.4 | 0 |
| 22 | 98 | (Finland) Joonas Lindroos | (Finland) Pasi Kilpeläinen | Citroën C2 R2 | 6 | 2:50:27.9 | 22:16.5 | 0 |
| 23 | 35 | (Poland) Maciej Oleksowicz | (Poland) Andrzej Obrebowski | Ford Fiesta S2000 | 2 | 2:50:34.6 | 22:23.2 | 0 |
| 24 | 63 | (Finland) Matias Kauppinen | (Finland) Jonne Halttunen | Subaru Impreza WRX STI | 3 | 2:51:18.6 | 23:07.2 | 0 |
| 25 | 49 | (Finland) Esapekka Lappi | (Finland) Janne Ferm | Ford Fiesta S2000 | 2 | 2:51:19.0 | 23:07.6 | 0 |
| 26 | 66 | (Finland) Andreas Amberg | (Finland) Matti Heikkinen | Ford Fiesta R2 | 6 | 2:52:10.5 | 23:59.1 | 0 |
| 27 | 21 | (Norway) Andreas Mikkelsen | (Norway) Ola Fløene | Škoda Fabia S2000 | 2 | 2:53:13.9 | 25:02.5 | 0 |
| 28 | 57 | (Finland) Kari Hämäläinen | (Finland) Risto Pietiläinen | Ford Fiesta S2000 | 2 | 2:53:37.4 | 25:26.0 | 0 |
| 29 | 64 | (Netherlands) Kees Burger | (Finland) Miika Teiskonen | Subaru Impreza WRX STI | 3 | 2:55:49.4 | 27:38.0 | 0 |
| 30 | 65 | (Finland) Jukka Korhonen | (Finland) Mikael Korhonen | Ford Fiesta R2 | 6 | 2:56:15.5 | 28:04.1 | 0 |
| 31 | 62 | (Ukraine) Oleksiy Tamrazov | (Italy) Nicola Arena | Ford Fiesta S2000 | 2 | 2:57:11.3 | 28:59.9 | 0 |
| 32 | 67 | (Norway) Frank Tore Larsen | (Norway) Torstein Eriksen | Ford Fiesta R2 | 6 | 2:57:18.2 | 29:06.8 | 0 |
| 33 | 91 | (France) Sebastien Chardonnet | (France) Thibault de la Hayhe | Citroën DS3 R3T | 5 | 2:58:58.5 | 30:47.1 | 0 |
| 34 | 70 | (France) Vincent Dubert | (France) Valentin Sarreaud | Citroën DS3 R3T | 5 | 3:01:08.0 | 32:56.6 | 0 |
| 35 | 90 | (France) Marc Amourette | (France) Gwenola Marie | Citroën DS3 R3T | 5 | 3:01:37.9 | 33:26.5 | 0 |
| 36 | 6 | (Russia) Evgeny Novikov | (France) Denis Giraudet | Ford Fiesta RS WRC | WRC | 3:02:58.5 | 34:47.1 | 0 |
| 37 | 76 | (Finland) Niko-Pekka Nieminen | (Finland) Pasi Haataja | Ford Fiesta R2 | 6 | 3:03:22.2 | 35:10.8 | 0 |
| 38 | 14 | (Brazil) Paulo Nobre | (Brazil) Edu Paula | Mini John Cooper Works WRC | WRC | 3:04:40.0 | 36:28.6 | 0 |
| 39 | 7 | (Australia) Chris Atkinson | (Belgium) Stéphane Prévot | Citroën DS3 WRC | WRC | 3:05:29.0 | 37:17.6 | 0 |
| 40 | 72 | (Finland) Jouni Virtanen | (Finland) Petteri Luostarinen | Subaru Impreza WRX STI | 3 | 3:07:00.0 | 38:48.6 | 0 |
| 41 | 89 | (Spain) Nil Solans | (Spain) Miquel Angel Ibañez | Ford Fiesta R2 | 6 | 3:09:02.1 | 40:50.7 | 0 |
| 42 | 73 | (Finland) Ari Saxberg | (Finland) Pekka Leppälä | Mitsubishi Lancer Evolution X | 3 | 3:09:49.2 | 41:37.8 | 0 |
| 43 | 77 | (Finland) Petri Itkonen | (Estonia) Janno Older | Citroën C2 R2 | 6 | 3:13:35.0 | 45:23.6 | 0 |
| 44 | 87 | (France) Lilian Vialle | (France) Patrice Roissac | Renault Clio R3 | 5 | 3:15:42.3 | 47:30.9 | 0 |
| 45 | 88 | (Italy) Massimiliano Settembrini | (Italy) Corrado Bonato | Citroën DS3 R3T | 5 | 3:21:59.3 | 53:47.9 | 0 |
| 46 | 75 | (Ukraine) Yuriy Protasov | (Ukraine) Kyrylo Nesvit | Citroën DS3 R3T | 5 | 3:24:42.3 | 56:30.9 | 0 |
| 47 | 94 | (Finland) Simo-Petteri Tuunanen | (Finland) Mika Heinonen | Citroën Saxo VTS | 9 | 3:27:25.3 | 59:13.9 | 0 |
| 48 | 83 | (Finland) Kristian Kiviniemi | (Finland) Asko Sairanen | Citroën C2 R2 | 6 | 3:29:16.2 | 1:01:04.8 | 0 |
| 49 | 95 | (Finland) Ilkka Pastila | (Finland) Pasi Riihiaho | Citroën Saxo VTS | 9 | 3:34:50.1 | 1:06:38.7 | 0 |
| 50 | 86 | (Italy) Fabrizio de Sanctis | (Italy) “Bombolino” | Mitsubishi Lancer Evolution IX | 3 | 3:34:52.1 | 1:06:40.7 | 0 |
| 51 | 61 | (Poland) Krzysztof Oleksowicz | (Poland) Krzysztof Geborys | Subaru Impreza WRX STI R4 | 2 | 3:39:45.8 | 1:11:34.4 | 0 |
| 52 | 74 | (Finland) Pasi Matsi | (Finland) Hannu Lamminen | Renault Clio R3 | 5 | 3:49:37.3 | 1:21:25.9 | 0 |
| 53 | 97 | (Belgium) Renaud Bronkart | (Luxembourg) Martine Victor | Toyota Yaris | 10 | 3:59:13.7 | 1:31:02.3 | 0 |
| Ret | 31 | (New Zealand) Hayden Paddon | (New Zealand) John Kennard | Škoda Fabia S2000 | 2 | Mechanical | | – |
| Ret | 32 | (Republic of Ireland) Craig Breen | (Republic of Ireland) Paul Nagle | Ford Fiesta S2000 | 2 | Accident | | – |
| Ret | 43 | (United States) Ken Block | (Italy) Alex Gelsomino | Ford Fiesta RS WRC | WRC | Mechanical | | – |
| Ret | 52 | (Finland) Jukka Ketomäki | (Finland) Kai Risberg | Mitsubishi Lancer Evolution X | 3 | Mechanical | | – |
| Ret | 53 | (Finland) Riku Tahko | (Finland) Markus Soininen | Mini John Cooper Works WRC | WRC | Accident | | – |
| Ret | 56 | (Finland) Mattias Therman | (Finland) Jarkko Kalliolepo | Ford Fiesta S2000 | 2 | Mechanical | | – |
| Ret | 58 | (Finland) Tuomas Skantz | (Finland) Jani Rauhala | Mitsubishi Lancer Evolution X | 3 | Mechanical | | – |
| Ret | 68 | (Finland) Kristian Yritys | (Finland) Janne Siirilä | Renault Clio R3 | 5 | Mechanical | | – |
| Ret | 71 | (Finland) Tomi Weurlander | (Finland) Pasi Nurmi | Subaru Impreza WRX STI | 3 | Mechanical | | – |
| Ret | 78 | (Finland) Sami Sarjula | (Finland) Teemu Horkama | Ford Fiesta R2 | 6 | Accident | | – |
| Ret | 79 | (Slovakia) Martin Koči | (Czech Republic) Lukáš Zámečník | Citroën C2 R2 | 6 | Accident | | – |
| Ret | 80 | (Finland) Niko Veikkanen | (Finland) Joni-Petteri Virtanen | Honda Civic Type R | 8 | Mechanical | | – |
| Ret | 81 | (Ukraine) Yukhym Vazheyevskyy | (Ukraine) Yevgen Kochkovyy | Citroën DS3 R3T | 5 | Accident | | – |
| Ret | 82 | (Australia) Molly Taylor | (United Kingdom) Sebastian Marshall | Citroën DS3 R3T | 5 | Mechanical | | – |
| Ret | 84 | (Finland) Kari Hytönen | (Finland) Ada Herranen | Ford Fiesta R2 | 6 | Mechanical | | – |
| Ret | 85 | (Finland) Ilkka Kariste | (Finland) Mikael Lindberg | Ford Fiesta ST | 8 | Mechanical | | – |
| Ret | 96 | (France) Eddy Brisson | (France) Kévin Masson | Suzuki Swift | 9 | Mechanical | | – |
| Ret | 101 | (United States) Christopher Duplessis | (United States) Alexander Kihurani | Ford Fiesta R2 | 6 | Academy^{†} | | – |
| Ret | 102 | (Spain) José Antonio Suárez | (Spain) Cándido Carrera | Ford Fiesta R2 | 6 | Academy^{†} | | – |
| Ret | 103 | (United Kingdom) Alastair Fisher | (United Kingdom) Daniel Barritt | Ford Fiesta R2 | 6 | Academy^{†} | | – |
| Ret | 105 | (Sweden) Pontus Tidemand | (Norway) Stig Rune Skjærmoen | Ford Fiesta R2 | 6 | Academy^{†} | | – |
| Ret | 106 | (Australia) Brendan Reeves | (Australia) Rhianon Smyth | Ford Fiesta R2 | 6 | Academy^{†} | | – |
| Ret | 107 | (Netherlands) Timo van der Marel | (Netherlands) Erwin Berkhof | Ford Fiesta R2 | 6 | Accident | | – |
| Ret | 108 | (United Kingdom) John MacCrone | (United Kingdom) Stuart Loudon | Ford Fiesta R2 | 6 | Academy^{†} | | – |
| Ret | 109 | (United Kingdom) Elfyn Evans | (United Kingdom) Philip Pugh | Ford Fiesta R2 | 6 | Academy^{†} | | – |
| Ret | 111 | (Portugal) João Silva | (Portugal) Hugo Magalhães | Ford Fiesta R2 | 6 | Academy^{†} | | – |
| Ret | 113 | (South Africa) Ashley Haigh-Smith | (United Kingdom) Craig Parry | Ford Fiesta R2 | 6 | Academy^{†} | | – |
| Ret | 114 | (Sweden) Fredrik Åhlin | (Norway) Morten Erik Abrahamsen | Ford Fiesta R2 | 6 | Accident | | – |
SWRC
| 1 (11) | 33 | (Sweden) Per-Gunnar Andersson | (Sweden) Emil Axelsson | Proton Satria Neo S2000 | 2 | 2:39:01.2 | 0.0 | 25 |
| 2 (17) | 36 | (Saudi Arabia) Yazeed Al-Rajhi | (United Kingdom) Michael Orr | Ford Fiesta RRC | 2 | 2:42:19.0 | 3:17.8 | 18 |
| 3 (18) | 34 | (Finland) Juha Salo | (Finland) Marko Salminen | Proton Satria Neo S2000 | 2 | 2:44:47.9 | 5:46.7 | 15 |
| 4 (23) | 35 | (Poland) Maciej Oleksowicz | (Poland) Andrzej Obrebowski | Ford Fiesta S2000 | 2 | 2:50:34.6 | 11:33.4 | 12 |
| 5 (25) | 49 | (Finland) Esapekka Lappi | (Finland) Janne Ferm | Ford Fiesta S2000 | 2 | 2:51:19.0 | 12:17.8 | 10 |
| Ret | 31 | (New Zealand) Hayden Paddon | (New Zealand) John Kennard | Škoda Fabia S2000 | 2 | Mechanical | | – |
| Ret | 32 | (Republic of Ireland) Craig Breen | (Republic of Ireland) Paul Nagle | Ford Fiesta S2000 | 2 | Accident | | – |
WRC Academy^{†}
| 1 | 109 | (United Kingdom) Elfyn Evans | (United Kingdom) Philip Pugh | Ford Fiesta R2 | 6 | 2:34:07.7 | 0.0 | 32 |
| 2 | 105 | (Sweden) Pontus Tidemand | (Norway) Stig Rune Skjærmoen | Ford Fiesta R2 | 6 | 2:35:03.0 | 55.3 | 24 |
| 3 | 106 | (Australia) Brendan Reeves | (Australia) Rhianon Smyth | Ford Fiesta R2 | 6 | 2:35:35.1 | 1:27.4 | 17 |
| 4 | 102 | (Spain) José Antonio Suárez | (Spain) Cándido Carrera | Ford Fiesta R2 | 6 | 2:36:22.5 | 2:14.8 | 13 |
| 5 | 108 | (United Kingdom) John MacCrone | (United Kingdom) Stuart Loudon | Ford Fiesta R2 | 6 | 2:37:09.7 | 3:02.0 | 10 |
| 6 | 101 | (United States) Christopher Duplessis | (United States) Alexander Kihurani | Ford Fiesta R2 | 6 | 2:41:26.2 | 7:18.5 | 8 |
| 7 | 111 | (Portugal) João Silva | (Portugal) Hugo Magalhães | Ford Fiesta R2 | 6 | 2:47:45.7 | 13:38.0 | 6 |
| 8 | 113 | (South Africa) Ashley Haigh-Smith | (United Kingdom) Craig Parry | Ford Fiesta R2 | 6 | 3:04:09.2 | 30:01.5 | 4 |
| 9 | 103 | (United Kingdom) Alastair Fisher | (United Kingdom) Daniel Barritt | Ford Fiesta R2 | 6 | 3:14:16.6 | 40:08.9 | 3 |
| Ret | 107 | (Netherlands) Timo van der Marel | (Netherlands) Erwin Berkhof | Ford Fiesta R2 | 6 | Accident | | – |
| Ret | 114 | (Sweden) Fredrik Åhlin | (Norway) Morten Erik Abrahamsen | Ford Fiesta R2 | 6 | Accident | | – |

- Note: ^† – The WRC Academy featured all but the last stage of the rally, and therefore the academy drivers weren't able to finish the rally.

=== Special Stages ===
All dates and times are EEST (UTC+3).

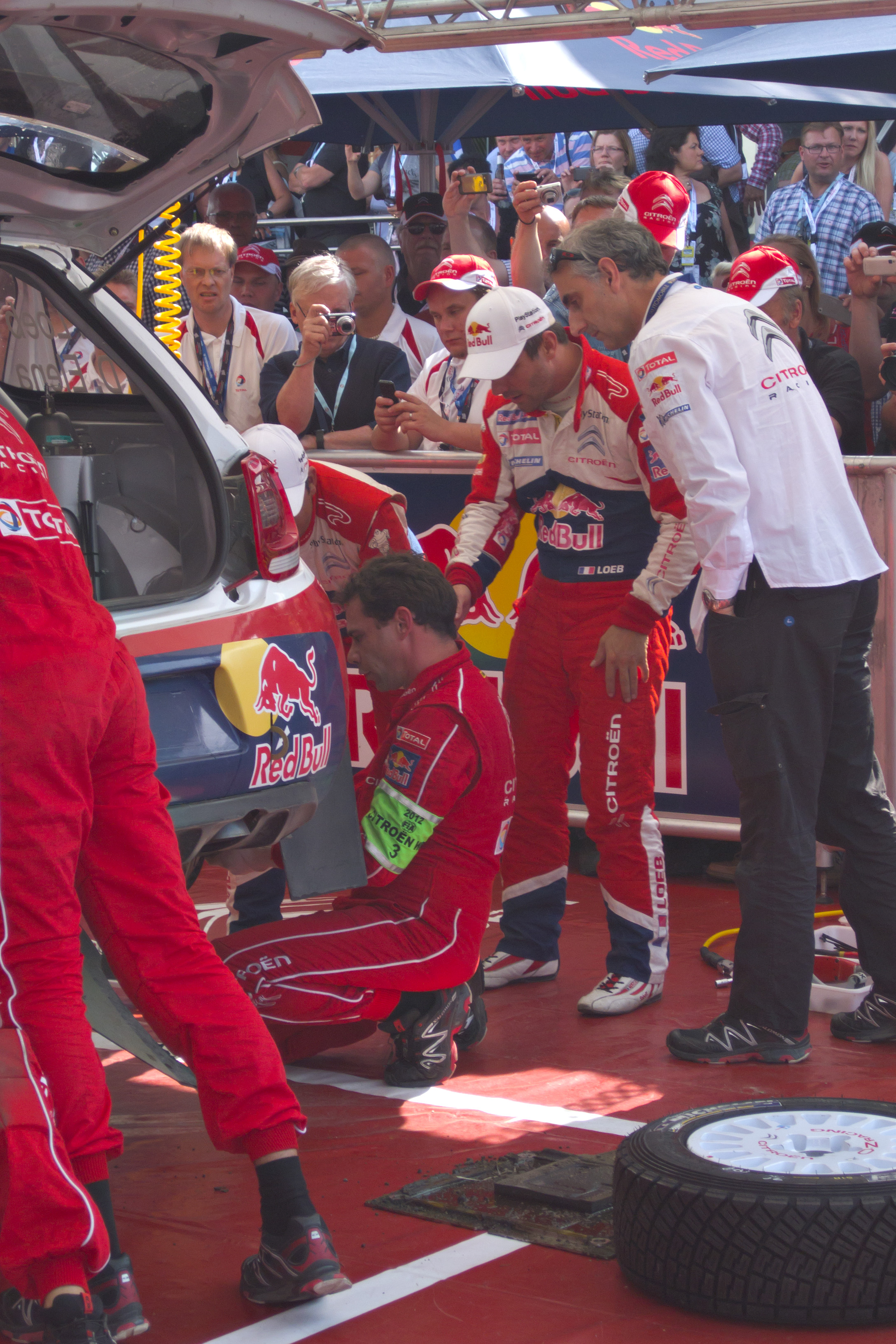
Sebastien Loeb checks his rear suspension after SS8.

| Leg | Day | Stage | Time | Name | Length | Winner | Time | Avg. spd. | Rally leader |
|---|---|---|---|---|---|---|---|---|---|
| Leg 1 | Day 1 (2 Aug) | SS1 | 17:23 | Koukunmaa | 13.68 km | (France) Sébastien Loeb | 6:59.8 | 117.31 km/h | (France) Sébastien Loeb |
| Leg 1 | Day 1 (2 Aug) | SS2 | 19:00 | SSS Jokimaa | 2.00 km | (Norway) Petter Solberg | 1:32.5 | 77.84 km/h | (France) Sébastien Loeb |
| Leg 1 | Day 1 (2 Aug) | SS3 | 20:50 | Mynnilä | 14.22 km | (France) Sébastien Loeb | 6:34.7 | 129.70 km/h | (France) Sébastien Loeb |
| Leg 1 | Day 2 (3 Aug) | SS4 | 7:42 | Urria | 12.75 km | (France) Sébastien Loeb | 5:59.5 | 127.68 km/h | (France) Sébastien Loeb |
| Leg 1 | Day 2 (3 Aug) | SS5 | 8:39 | Jukojärvi | 22.29 km | (Finland) Mikko Hirvonen | 10:34.0 | 126.57 km/h | (France) Sébastien Loeb |
| Leg 1 | Day 2 (3 Aug) | SS6 | 11:28 | Mökkiperä 1 | 11.38 km | (Finland) Mikko Hirvonen | 5:29.6 | 124.30 km/h | (France) Sébastien Loeb |
| Leg 1 | Day 2 (3 Aug) | SS7 | 12:14 | Palsankylä 1 | 13.92 km | (France) Sébastien Loeb | 7:06.8 | 117.41 km/h | (France) Sébastien Loeb |
| Leg 1 | Day 2 (3 Aug) | SS8 | 13:32 | Lankamaa 1 | 23.06 km | (Finland) Mikko Hirvonen | 11:11.4 | 123.65 km/h | (France) Sébastien Loeb |
| Leg 1 | Day 2 (3 Aug) | SS9 | 16:08 | Mökkiperä 2 | 11.38 km | (Finland) Mikko Hirvonen | 5:26.8 | 125.36 km/h | (France) Sébastien Loeb |
| Leg 1 | Day 2 (3 Aug) | SS10 | 16:54 | Palsankylä 2 | 13.92 km | (France) Sébastien Loeb | 7:01.7 | 118.83 km/h | (France) Sébastien Loeb |
| Leg 1 | Day 2 (3 Aug) | SS11 | 18:12 | Lankamaa 2 | 23.06 km | (Norway) Petter Solberg | 11:03.2 | 125.17 km/h | (France) Sébastien Loeb |
| Leg 1 | Day 2 (3 Aug) | SS12 | 20:00 | SSS Killeri | 2.06 km | (France) Sébastien Loeb | 1:22.8 | 89.57 km/h | (France) Sébastien Loeb |
| Leg 2 | Day 3 (4 Aug) | SS13 | 7:56 | Surkee 1 | 14.95 km | (France) Sébastien Loeb | 8:05.7 | 110.81 km/h | (France) Sébastien Loeb |
| Leg 2 | Day 3 (4 Aug) | SS14 | 8:54 | Leustu 1 | 21.94 km | (Finland) Mikko Hirvonen | 10:25.8 | 126.21 km/h | (France) Sébastien Loeb |
| Leg 2 | Day 3 (4 Aug) | SS15 | 11:18 | Surkee 2 | 14.95 km | (France) Sébastien Loeb | 8:00.3 | 112.05 km/h | (France) Sébastien Loeb |
| Leg 2 | Day 3 (4 Aug) | SS16 | 12:16 | Leustu 2 | 21.94 km | (France) Sébastien Loeb (Finland) Jari-Matti Latvala | 10:20.2 | 127.35 km/h | (France) Sébastien Loeb |
| Leg 2 | Day 3 (4 Aug) | SS17 | 15:37 | Ouninpohja 1 | 33.01 km | (Finland) Mikko Hirvonen | 15:26.9 | 128.21 km/h | (France) Sébastien Loeb |
| Leg 2 | Day 3 (4 Aug) | SS18 | 18:00 | Ouninpohja 2 (Power stage) | 33.01 km | (Finland) Mikko Hirvonen | 15:17.3 | 129.55 km/h | (France) Sébastien Loeb |

=== Power stage ===
The Power stage was a legendary Rally Finland stage, 33.01 km long Ouninpohja. The three fastest crews of this stage were awarded by drivers' championship points.

| Pos. | No. | Driver | Co-driver | Car | Class | Time | Difference | Avg. spd. | Points |
|---|---|---|---|---|---|---|---|---|---|
| 1 | 2 | (Finland) Mikko Hirvonen | (Finland) Jarmo Lehtinen | Citroën DS3 WRC | WRC | 15:17.350 | 0.000 | 129.543 km/h | 3 |
| 2 | 4 | (Norway) Petter Solberg | (United Kingdom) Chris Patterson | Ford Fiesta RS WRC | WRC | 15:17.983 | 0.633 | 129.453 km/h | 2 |
| 3 | 1 | (France) Sébastien Loeb | (Monaco) Daniel Elena | Citroën DS3 WRC | WRC | 15:18.427 | 1.077 | 129.391 km/h | 1 |

== Championship standings after Rally Finland ==
Drivers' championship standings

| | Pos. | Driver | Points |
|---|---|---|---|
| | 1 | (France) Sébastien Loeb | 171 |
| | 2 | (Finland) Mikko Hirvonen | 128 |
| | 3 | (Norway) Petter Solberg | 104 |
| | 4 | (Norway) Mads Østberg | 90 |
| 1 | 5 | (Finland) Jari-Matti Latvala | 69 |

Manufacturers' championship standings

| Pos. | Manufacturer | Points |
|---|---|---|
| 1 | (France) Citroën Total World Rally Team | 280 |
| 2 | (United Kingdom) Ford World Rally Team | 171 |
| 3 | (United Kingdom) M-Sport Ford World Rally Team | 115 |
| 4 | Qatar World Rally Team | 49 |
| 5 | (France) Citroën Junior World Rally Team | 48 |

SWRC Drivers' championship standings

| | Pos. | Driver | Points |
|---|---|---|---|
| 2 | 1 | (Sweden) Per-Gunnar Andersson | 68 |
| 1 | 2 | (New Zealand) Hayden Paddon | 62 |
| 1 | 3 | (Poland) Maciej Oleksowicz | 53 |
| 2 | 4 | (Republic of Ireland) Craig Breen | 43 |
| | 5 | (Saudi Arabia) Yazeed Al-Rajhi | 40 |

WRC Academy Drivers' championship standings

| | Pos. | Driver | Points |
|---|---|---|---|
| 1 | 1 | (United Kingdom) Elfyn Evans | 70 |
| 1 | 2 | (Australia) Brendan Reeves | 52 |
| 2 | 3 | (United Kingdom) Alastair Fisher | 49 |
| 2 | 4 | (Sweden) Pontus Tidemand | 41 |
| 1 | 5 | (Spain) José Antonio Suárez | 34 |

- Note: Only the top five positions are included in all sets of standings.
