= 2012 Rallye de France =

Car race in Strasbourg, france

2012 Rallye de France Rallye de France – Alsace 2012
Round 11 of the 2012 World Rally Championship
← Previous event	Next event →
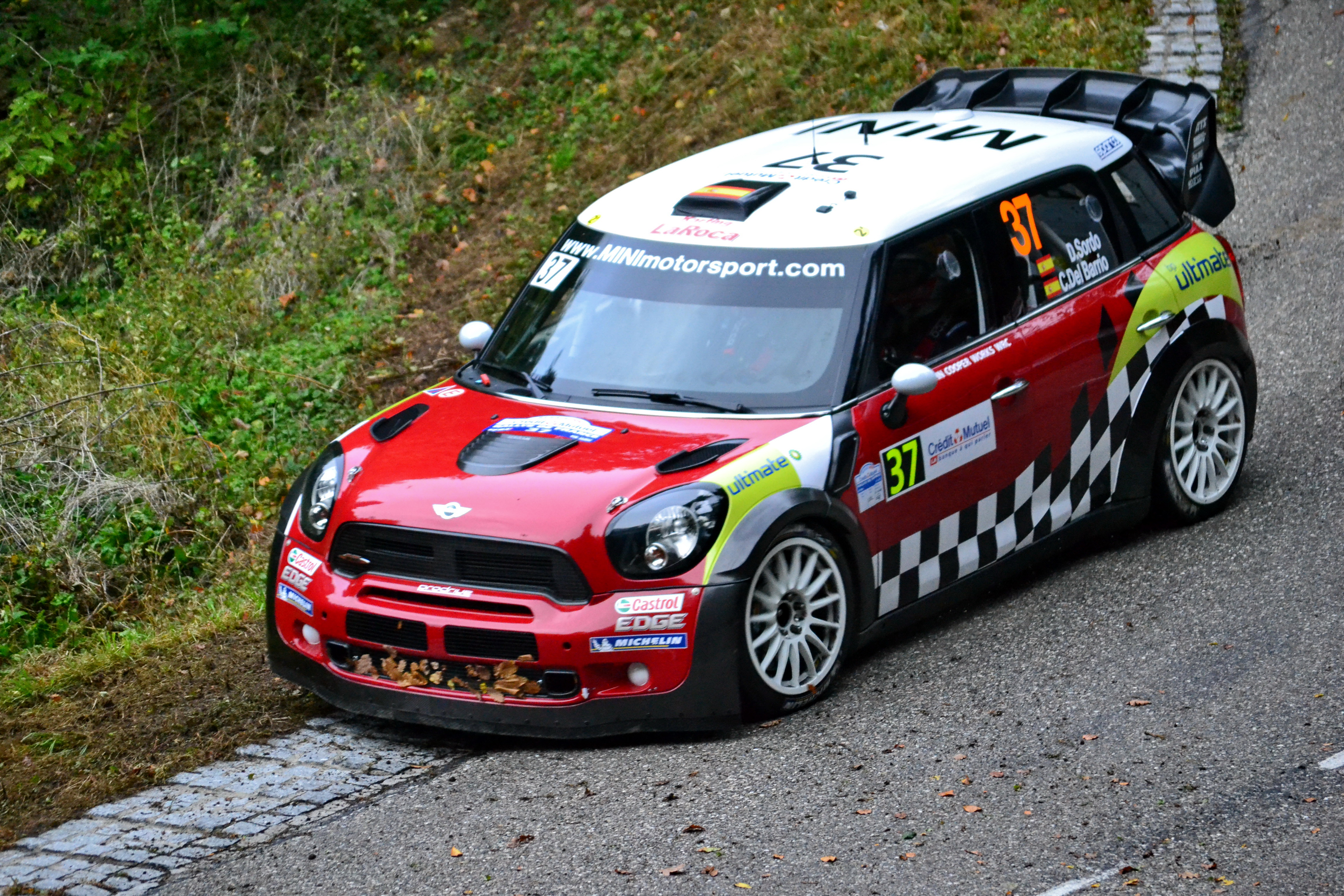
- Dani Sordo during Rally
- Host country: France
- Rally base: Strasbourg, Alsace
- Dates run: 4 – 7 October 2012
- Stages: 22 (404.14 km; 251.12 miles)
- Stage surface: Tarmac
- Overall distance: 1,404.89 km (872.96 miles)

Statistics
- Crews: 71 at start, 45 at finish

Overall results
- Overall winner: (France) Sébastien Loeb (France) Citroën World Rally Team

The 2012 Rallye de France – Alsace was the eleventh round of the 2012 World Rally Championship season. The rally took place over 4–7 October, and was based in Strasbourg, the capital city of the Alsace region of France. The rally was also the seventh round of the Super 2000 World Rally Championship, and the fifth round of the WRC Academy.

Victor Sébastien Loeb retained his driver champion title in this rally, and the third place of his teammate Mikko Hirvonen allowed Citroën to retain the manufacturer title as well, making this rally a repeat of the 2010 event.

== Results ==
=== Event standings ===
Pos.	Driver	Co-driver	Car	Time	Difference	Points
Overall
1.	(France) Sébastien Loeb	(Monaco) Daniel Elena	Citroën DS3 WRC	3:32:53.0	0.0	25
2.	(Finland) Jari-Matti Latvala	(Finland) Miikka Anttila	Ford Fiesta RS WRC	3:33:08.5	15.5	18
3.	(Finland) Mikko Hirvonen	(Finland) Jarmo Lehtinen	Citroën DS3 WRC	3:33:37.1	44.1	15
4.	(Belgium) Thierry Neuville	(Belgium) Nicolas Gilsoul	Citroën DS3 WRC	3:34:00.3	1:07.3	14
5.	(Norway) Mads Østberg	(Sweden) Jonas Andersson	Ford Fiesta RS WRC	3:34:09.4	1:16.4	11
6.	(Estonia) Ott Tänak	(Estonia) Kuldar Sikk	Ford Fiesta RS WRC	3:35.20.9	2:27.9	11
7.	(Russia) Evgeny Novikov	(Austria) Ilka Minor	Ford Fiesta RS WRC	3:38:44.6	5:51.6	6
8.	(Australia) Chris Atkinson	(Australia) Glenn MacNeall	Mini John Cooper Works WRC	3:39:35.4	6:42.4	4
9.	(Czech Republic) Martin Prokop	(Czech Republic) Zdeněk Hrůza	Ford Fiesta RS WRC	3:41:39.8	8:46.8	2
10.	(France) Sébastien Chardonnet	(France) Thibault de la Haye	Citroën DS3 WRC	3:41:52.7	8:59.7	1
SWRC
1. (17.)	(Republic of Ireland) Craig Breen	(Republic of Ireland) Paul Nagle	Ford Fiesta S2000	3:50:11.3	0.0	25
2. (18.)	(Saudi Arabia) Yazeed Al-Rajhi	(United Kingdom) Michael Orr	Ford Fiesta RRC	3:50:48.9	37.6	18
3. (24.)	(Sweden) Per-Gunnar Andersson	(Sweden) Emil Axelsson	Proton Satria Neo S2000	4:07:44.1	17:32.5	15
4. (30.)	(Austria) Andreas Aigner	(Germany) Detlef Ruf	Proton Satria Neo S2000	4:10:26.6	20:15.3	12
WRC Academy^{†}
1.	(United Kingdom) Elfyn Evans	(United Kingdom) Philip Pugh	Ford Fiesta R2	3:20:42.6	0.0	28
2.	(Spain) José Antonio Suárez	(Spain) Cándido Carrera	Ford Fiesta R2	3:21:25.1	42.5	22
3.	(United Kingdom) John MacCrone	(United Kingdom) Stuart Loudon	Ford Fiesta R2	3:22:18.0	1:35.4	17
4.	(Australia) Brendan Reeves	(Australia) Rhianon Smyth	Ford Fiesta R2	3:23:49.1	3:06.5	13
5.	(Sweden) Fredrik Åhlin	(Norway) Morten Erik Abrahamsen	Ford Fiesta R2	3:24:18.9	3:36.3	11
6.	(Sweden) Pontus Tidemand	(Norway) Stig Rune Skjærmoen	Ford Fiesta R2	3:27:57.7	7:15.1	10
7.	(Netherlands) Timo van der Marel	(Netherlands) Erwin Berkhof	Ford Fiesta R2	3:35:09.8	14:27.2	6

- Note: ^† – The WRC Academy featured the two first legs of the rally.

=== Special stages ===
All dates and times are CEST (UTC+2).

Leg	Stage	Time	Name	Length	Winner	Time	Avg. spd.	Rally leader
Leg 1 (4 Oct/5 Oct)	SS1	16:30	SSS Strasbourg	3.63 km	(Belgium) Thierry Neuville	2:44.7	79.34 km/h	(Belgium) Thierry Neuville
Leg 1 (4 Oct/5 Oct)	SS2	9:23	Hohlandsbourg – Firstplan 1	28.67 km	(France) Sébastien Loeb	14:36.1	117.81 km/h	(France) Sébastien Loeb
Leg 1 (4 Oct/5 Oct)	SS3	10:06	Vallée de Munster 1	22.16 km	(France) Sébastien Loeb	11:18.8	117.53 km/h	(France) Sébastien Loeb
Leg 1 (4 Oct/5 Oct)	SS4	11:22	Soultzeren – Pays Welche 1	19.93 km	(Finland) Jari-Matti Latvala	9:49.2	121.77 km/h	(France) Sébastien Loeb
Leg 1 (4 Oct/5 Oct)	SS5	13:56	Hohlandsbourg – Firstplan 2	28.67 km	(France) Sébastien Loeb	14:28.9	118.78 km/h	(France) Sébastien Loeb
Leg 1 (4 Oct/5 Oct)	SS6	14:39	Vallée de Munster 2	22.16 km	(Finland) Jari-Matti Latvala	11:07.0	119.60 km/h	(France) Sébastien Loeb
Leg 1 (4 Oct/5 Oct)	SS7	15:55	Soultzeren – Pays Welche 2	19.93 km	(France) Sébastien Loeb	9:44.6	122.73 km/h	(France) Sébastien Loeb
Leg 1 (4 Oct/5 Oct)	SS8	18:35	SSS Mulhouse	4.65 km	(Finland) Jari-Matti Latvala	3:37.7	76.89 km/h	(France) Sébastien Loeb
Leg 2 (6 Oct)	SS9	8:38	Massif des Grands Crus – Ungersberg 1	18.16 km	(France) Sébastien Loeb	10:58.0	99.36 km/h	(France) Sébastien Loeb
Leg 2 (6 Oct)	SS10	9:36	Pays d'Ormont 1	43.45 km	(France) Sébastien Loeb	23:20.0	111.73 km/h	(France) Sébastien Loeb
Leg 2 (6 Oct)	SS11	10:47	Pays de la Haute Bruche 1	24.04 km	(Finland) Jari-Matti Latvala	11:13.1	128.58 km/h	(France) Sébastien Loeb
Leg 2 (6 Oct)	SS12	11:45	Klevener 1	10.75 km	Stage cancelled			(France) Sébastien Loeb
Leg 2 (6 Oct)	SS13	14:38	Massif des Grands Crus – Ungersberg 2	18.16 km	(Finland) Mikko Hirvonen (Finland) Jari-Matti Latvala	10:53.8	99.99 km/h	(France) Sébastien Loeb
Leg 2 (6 Oct)	SS14	15:36	Pays d'Ormont 2	43.45 km	(France) Sébastien Loeb	23:09.9	112.54 km/h	(France) Sébastien Loeb
Leg 2 (6 Oct)	SS15	16:47	Pays de la Haute Bruche 2	24.04 km	(France) Sébastien Loeb	11:10.8	129.02 km/h	(France) Sébastien Loeb
Leg 2 (6 Oct)	SS16	17:45	Klevener 2	10.75 km	(Finland) Jari-Matti Latvala	6:08.4	105.05 km/h	(France) Sébastien Loeb
Leg 3 (7 Oct)	SS17	9:23	Vignoble de Cleebourg 1	17.08 km	(Belgium) Thierry Neuville	10:11.7	100.52 km/h	(France) Sébastien Loeb
Leg 3 (7 Oct)	SS18	10:46	Bischwiller – Gries 1	7.95 km	(Belgium) Thierry Neuville	4:19.2	110.42 km/h	(France) Sébastien Loeb
Leg 3 (7 Oct)	SS19	11:16	SSS Haguenau 1	5.74 km	(Belgium) Thierry Neuville	4:16.2	80.66 km/h	(France) Sébastien Loeb
Leg 3 (7 Oct)	SS20	12:44	Vignoble de Cleebourg 2 (Power stage)	17.08 km	(Estonia) Ott Tänak	10:24.0	98.54 km/h	(France) Sébastien Loeb
Leg 3 (7 Oct)	SS21	14:07	Bischwiller – Gries 2	7.95 km	(Belgium) Thierry Neuville	4:16.8	111.45 km/h	(France) Sébastien Loeb
Leg 3 (7 Oct)	SS22	14:37	SSS Haguenau 2	5.74 km	(Belgium) Thierry Neuville	4:03.7	84.79 km/h	(France) Sébastien Loeb

=== Power stage ===
The Power stage was a 17.08 km stage run through the Vignoble de Cleebourg. The three fastest crews through this stage were awarded by drivers' championship points. Ott Tänak was the fastest driver through the stage, earning three additional championship points. Thierry Neuville was second, while Mads Østberg finished third.

Pos.	No.	Driver	Co-driver	Car	Class	Time	Difference	Avg. spd.	Points
1	5	(Estonia) Ott Tänak	(Estonia) Kuldar Sikk	Ford Fiesta RS WRC	WRC	10:24.0	0.000	98.32 km/h	3
2	8	(Belgium) Thierry Neuville	(Belgium) Nicolas Gilsoul	Citroën DS3 WRC	WRC	10:24.9	0.9	98.23 km/h	2
3	10	(Norway) Mads Østberg	(Sweden) Jonas Andersson	Ford Fiesta RS WRC	WRC	10:25.8	1.8	98.15 km/h	1
