= Ford Fiesta S2000 =

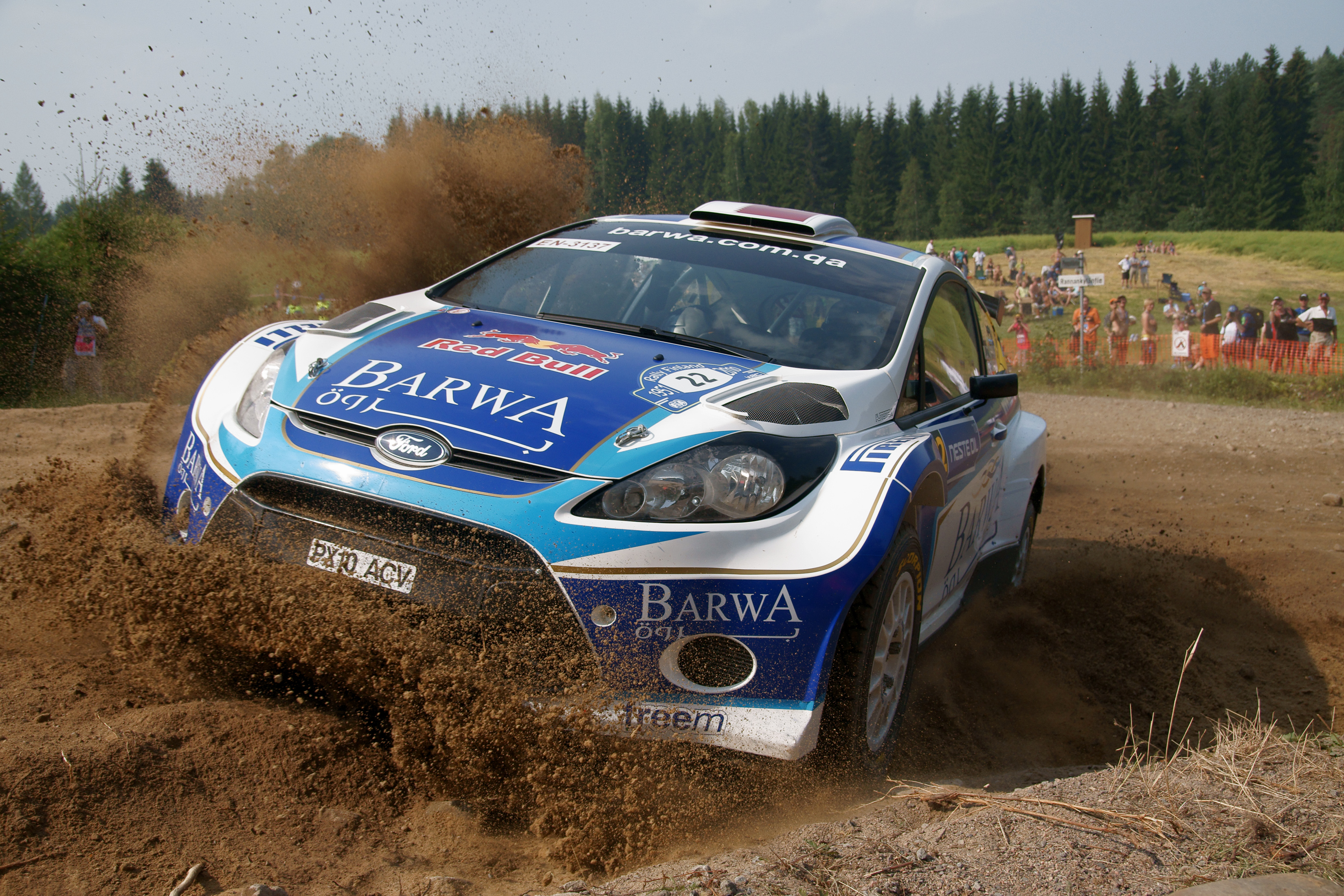
- Nasser Al-Attiyah at 2010 Rally Finland

Overview
- Manufacturer: Ford Europe/M-Sport
- Production: 2009–
- Assembly: Cockermouth, United Kingdom
- Designer: Christian Loriaux

Body and chassis
- Class: Super 2000
- Layout: 4-wheel drive

Powertrain
- Engine: 2.0 L (122 cu in) 4-cylinder, 16-valve
- Transmission: M-Sport/X-trac six-speed sequential gearbox with AP clutch

Dimensions
- Wheelbase: 2,489 mm (98.0 in)
- Length: 3,958 mm (155.8 in)
- Width: 1,820 mm (72 in)
- Kerb weight: 1,200 kg (2,646 lb)

The Ford Fiesta S2000 is a Super 2000 rally car built by M-Sport. It is based upon the Ford Fiesta road car. It made its racing debut at the 78th Rallye Monte Carlo in 2010, with factory team M-Sport and drivers Mikko Hirvonen and Julien Maurin. Hirvonen won the rally.

== SWRC/WRC-2 Victories ==
| No. | Event | Season | Driver | Co-driver |
|---|---|---|---|---|
| 1 | (Mexico) 2010 Rally México | 2010 | (Spain) Xavier Pons | (Spain) Alex Haro |
| 2 | 2010 Jordan Rally | 2010 | (Spain) Xavier Pons | (Spain) Alex Haro |
| 3 | 2010 Rally New Zealand | 2010 | (Finland) Jari Ketomaa | (Finland) Mika Stenberg |
| 4 | 2010 Rally de Portugal | 2010 | (Finland) Jari Ketomaa | (Finland) Mika Stenberg |
| 5 | 2010 Rally Japan | 2010 | (Finland) Jari Ketomaa | (Finland) Mika Stenberg |
| 6 | (Mexico) 2011 Rally México | 2011 | (Czech Republic) Martin Prokop | (Czech Republic) Jan Tománek |
| 7 | 2011 Jordan Rally | 2011 | (Portugal) Bernardo Sousa | (Portugal) António Costa |
| 8 | (Italy) 2011 Rally Italia Sardegna | 2011 | (Estonia) Ott Tänak | (Estonia) Kuldar Sikk |
| 9 | (Germany) 2011 Rallye Deutschland | 2011 | (Estonia) Ott Tänak | (Estonia) Kuldar Sikk |
| 10 | 2011 Rallye de France-Alsace | 2011 | (Estonia) Ott Tänak | (Estonia) Kuldar Sikk |
| 11 | (Monaco) 2012 Monte Carlo Rally | 2012 | (Republic of Ireland) Craig Breen | (United Kingdom) Gareth Roberts |
| 12 | (United Kingdom) 2012 Wales Rally GB | 2012 | (Republic of Ireland) Craig Breen | (Republic of Ireland) Paul Nagle |
| 13 | 2012 Rallye de France-Alsace | 2012 | (Republic of Ireland) Craig Breen | (Republic of Ireland) Paul Nagle |
| 14 | (Spain) 2012 Rally Catalunya | 2012 | (Republic of Ireland) Craig Breen | (Republic of Ireland) Paul Nagle |
| 15 | 2014 Rally Sweden | 2014 | (Estonia) Karl Kruuda | (Estonia) Martin Järveoja |
| 16 | 2014 Rally Finland | 2014 | (Estonia) Karl Kruuda | (Estonia) Martin Järveoja |

== IRC Victories ==
| No. | Event | Season | Driver | Co-driver |
|---|---|---|---|---|
| 1 | (Monaco) 2010 Monte Carlo Rally | 2010 | (Finland) Mikko Hirvonen | (Finland) Jarmo Lehtinen |
| 2 | 2010 Cyprus Rally | 2010 | (Qatar) Nasser Al-Attiyah | (Italy) Giovanni Bernacchini |
| 3 | (Ukraine) 2012 Prime Yalta Rally | 2012 | (Turkey) Yağız Avcı | (Turkey) Bahadır Gücenmez |

== Gallery ==
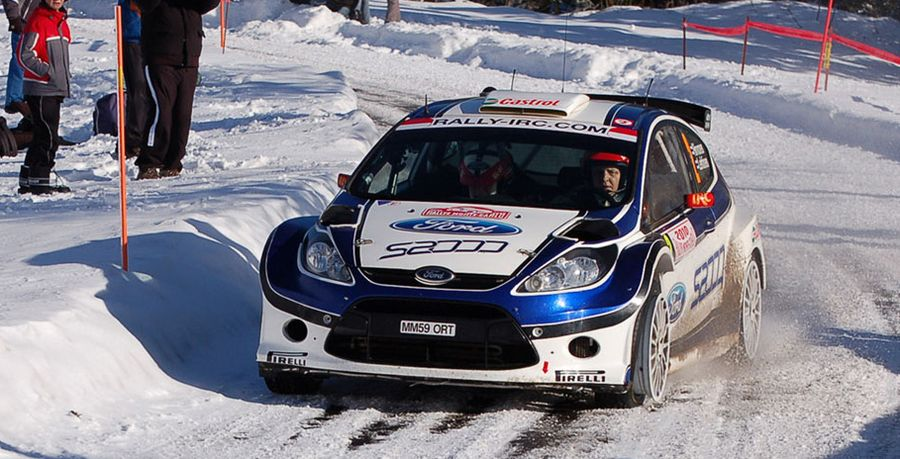
Mikko Hirvonen at 2010 Monte Carlo Rally

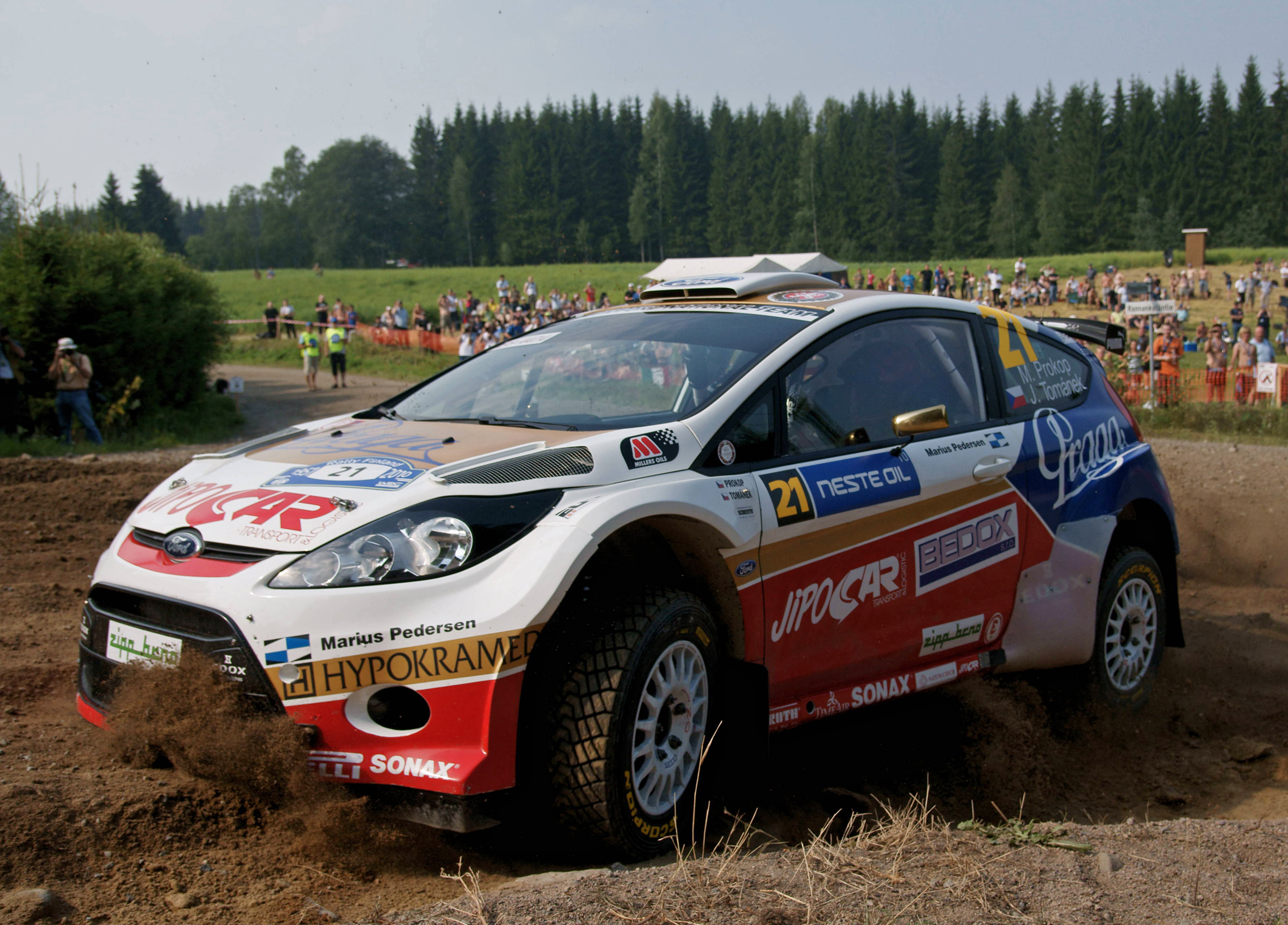
Martin Prokop at 2010 Rally Finland

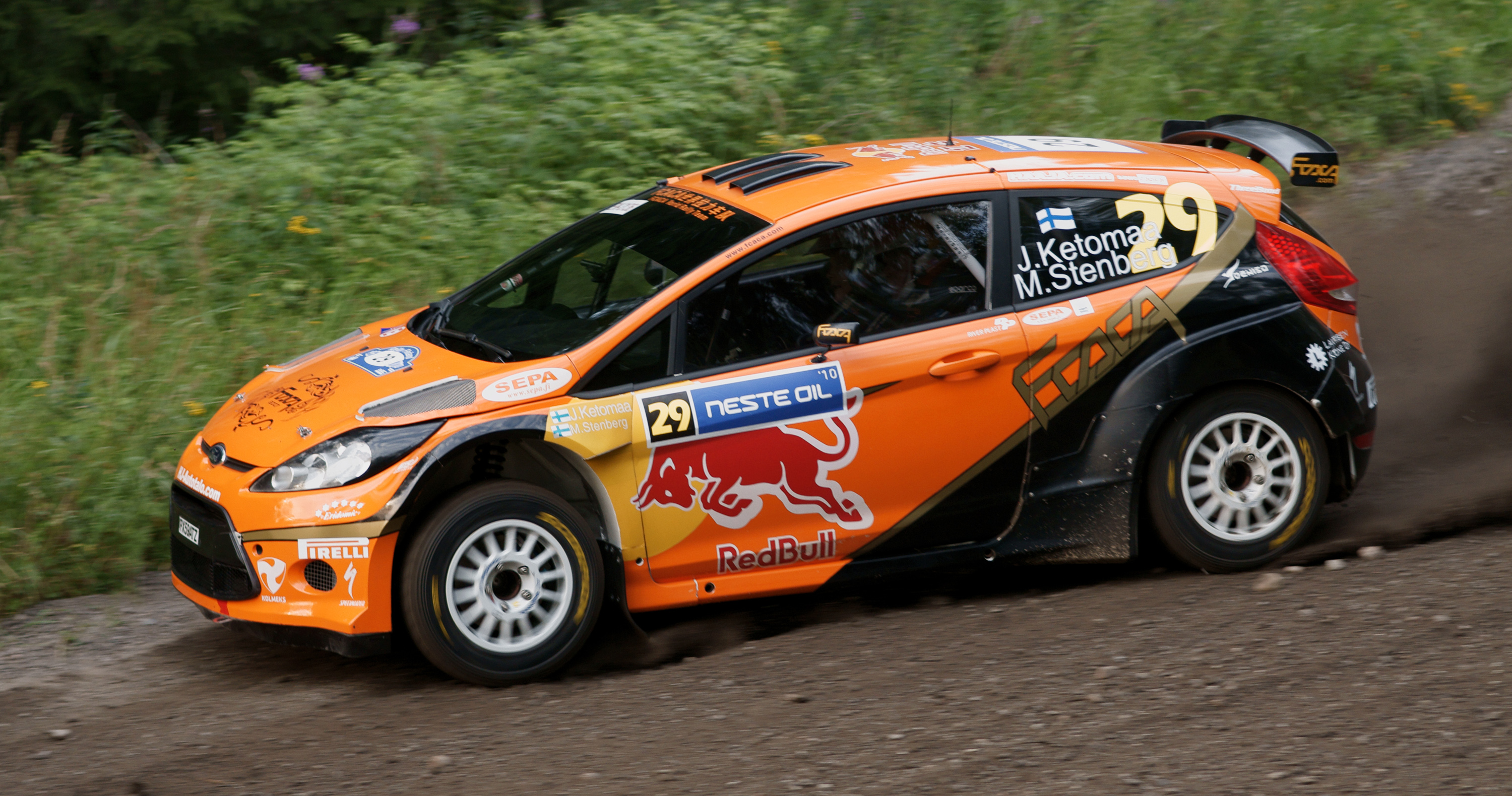
Jari Ketomaa at 2010 Rally Finland

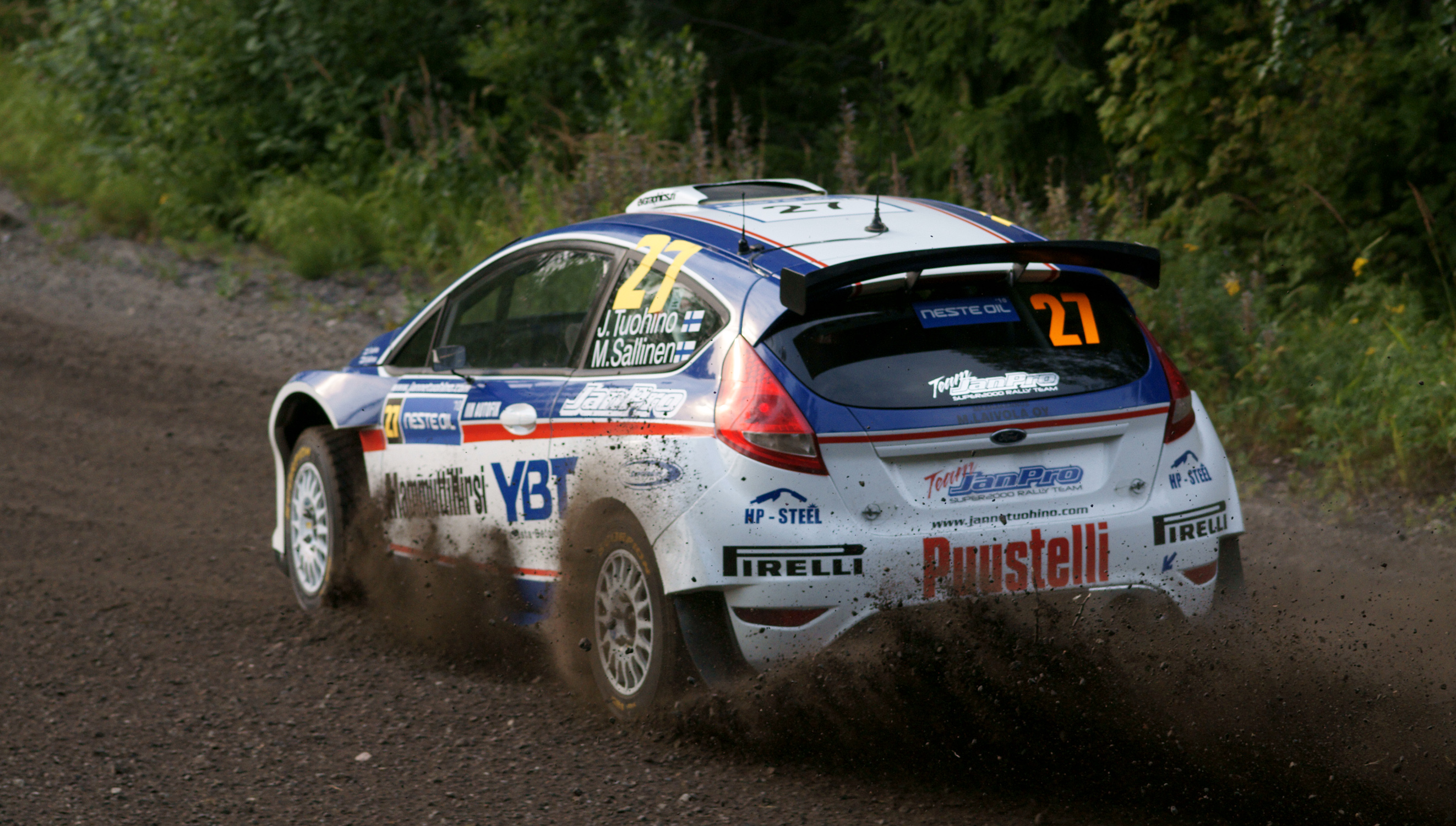
Janne Tuohino at 2010 Rally Finland

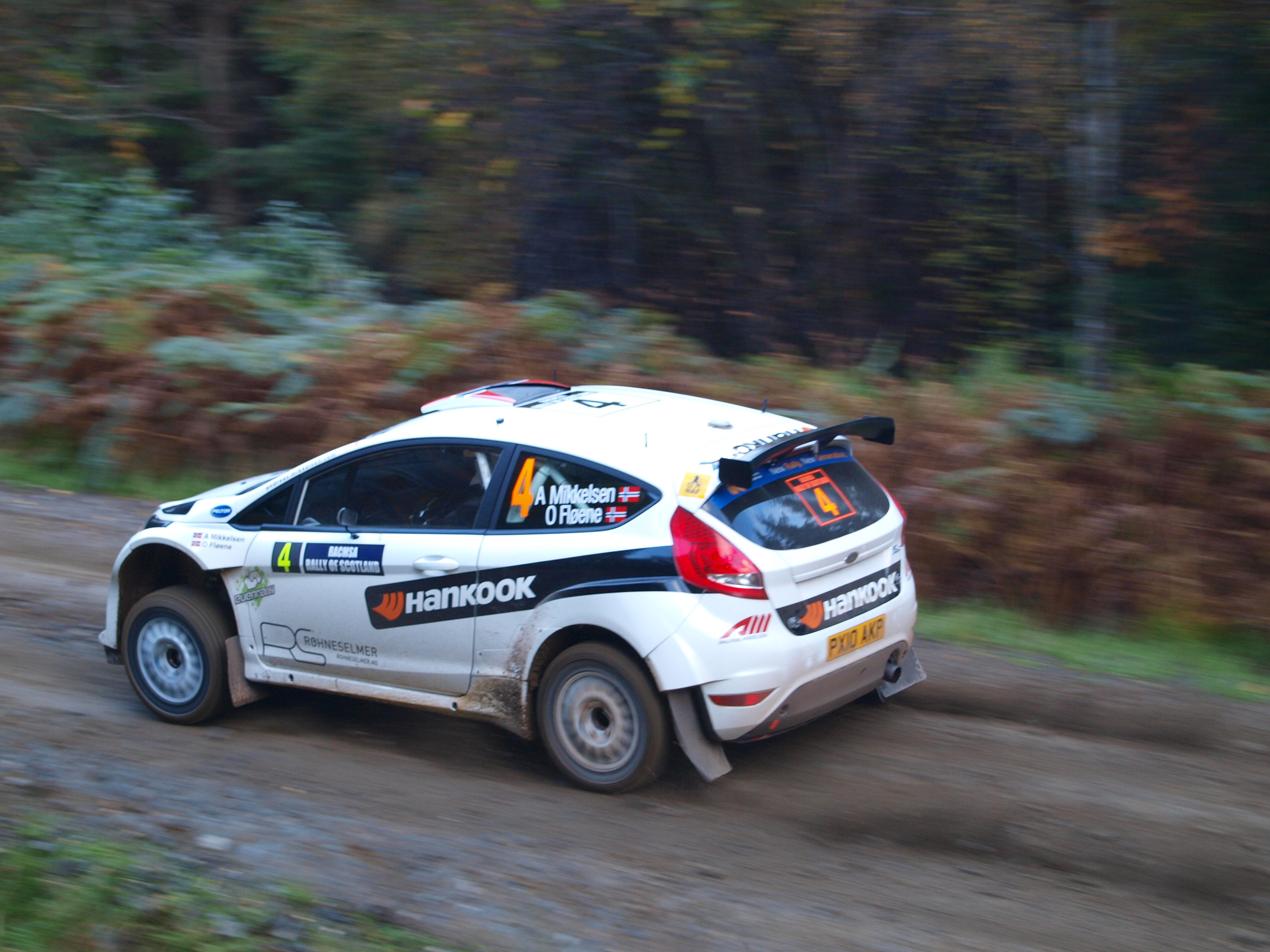
Andreas Mikkelsen at 2010 Rally Scotland

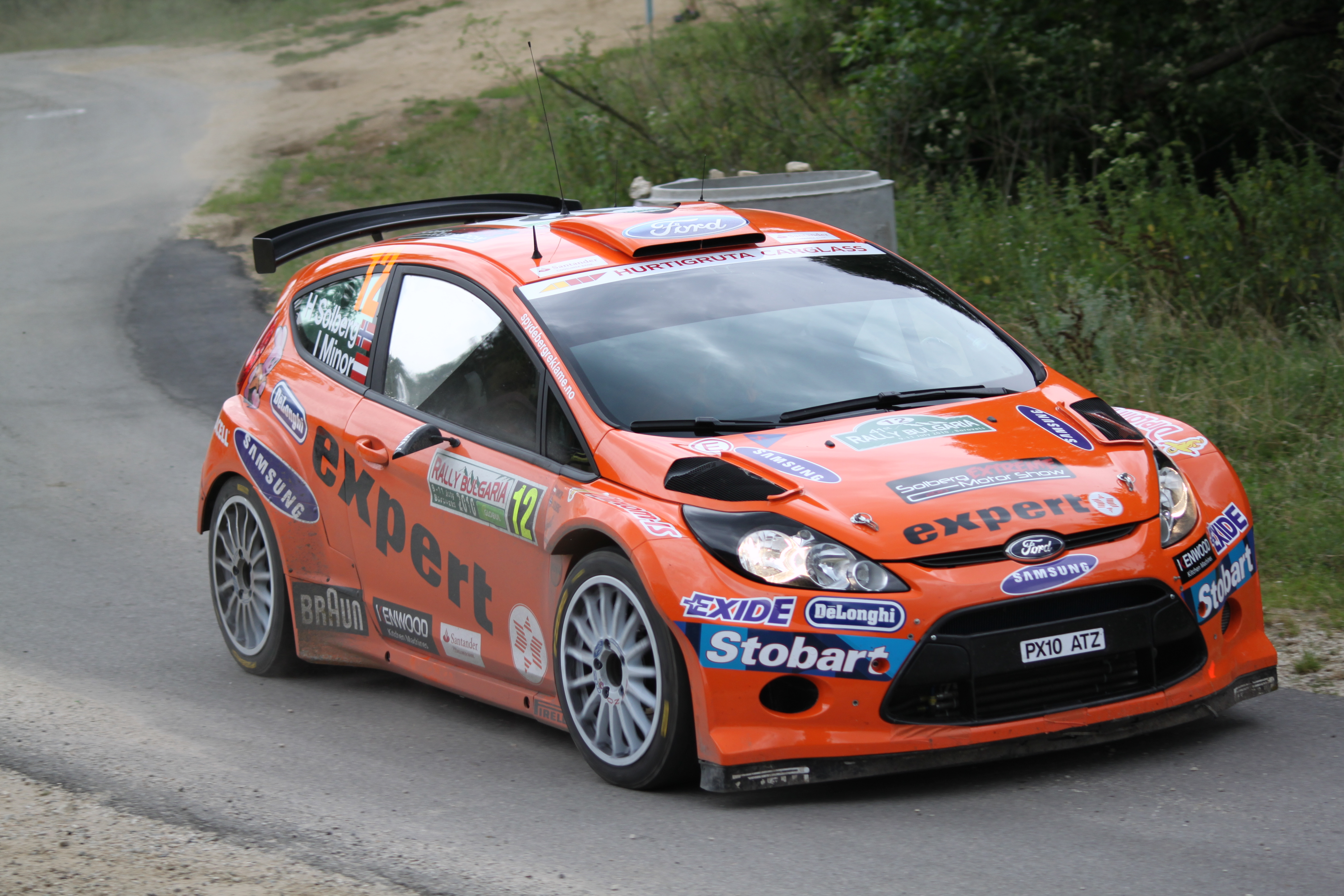
Henning Solberg at 2010 Rally Bulgaria

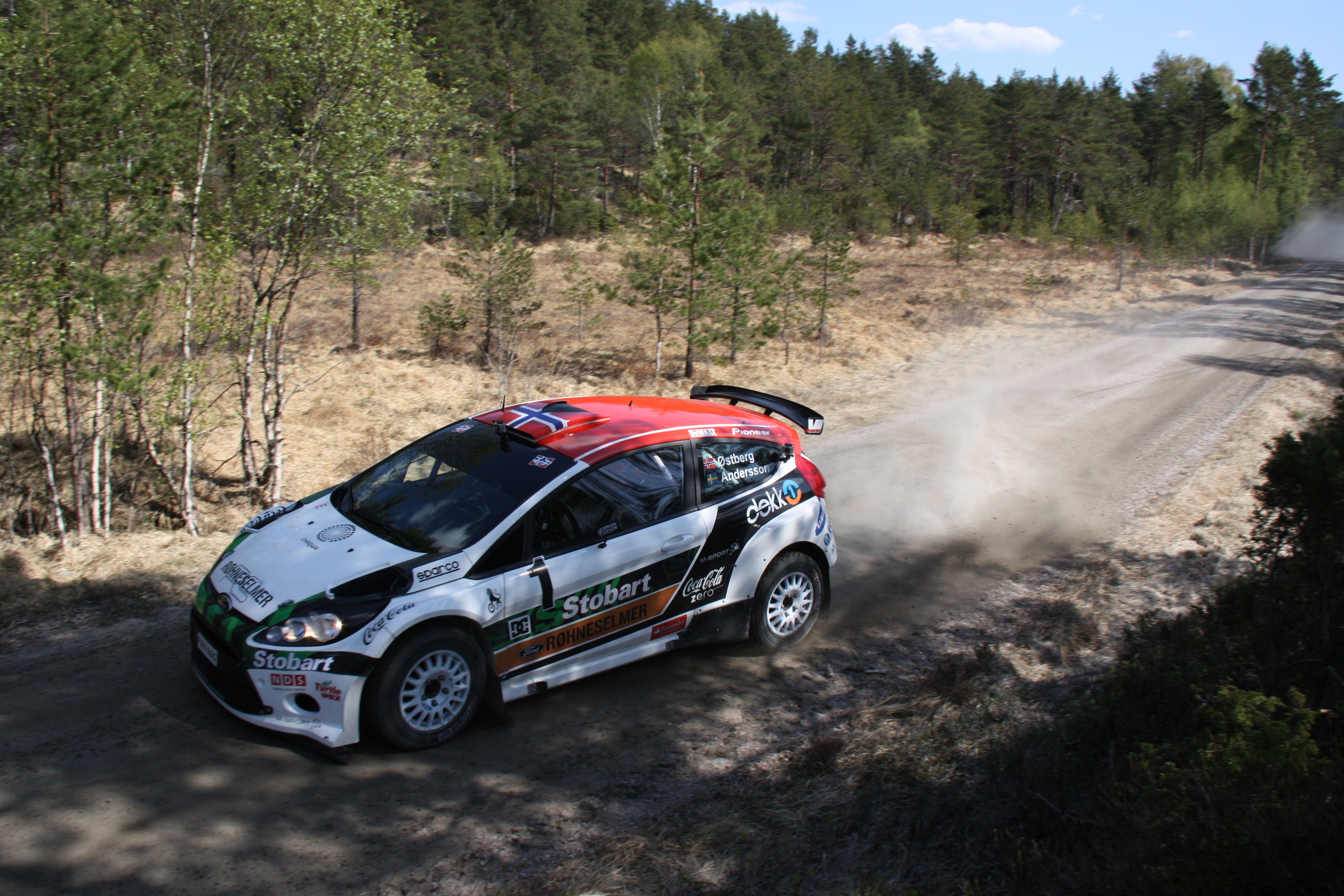
Mads Østberg at 2011 Rally Sørland

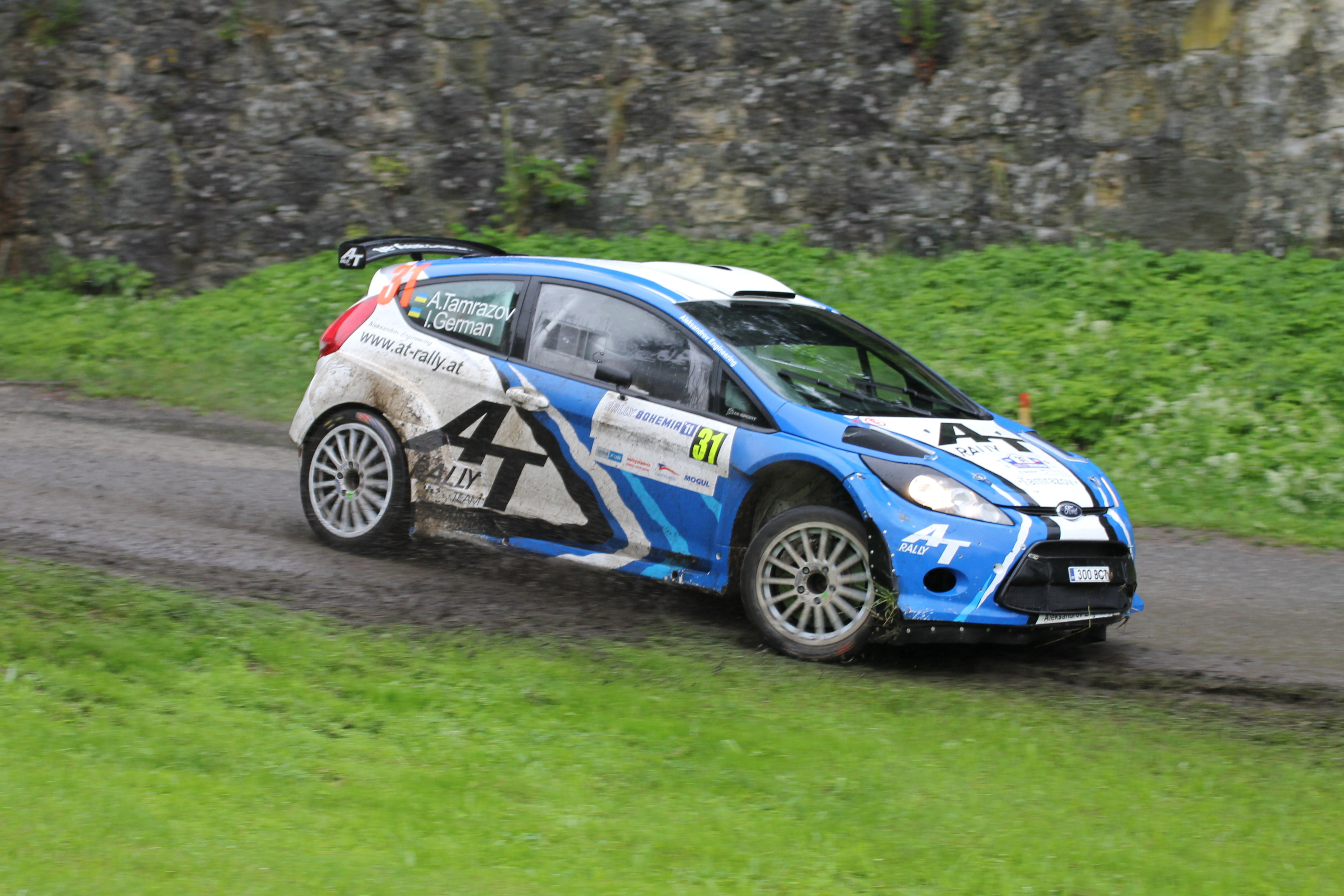
Oleksiy Tamrazov at 2011 Rally Bohemia
