= Reeta Hämäläinen =

Finnish rally co-driver (born 1988)

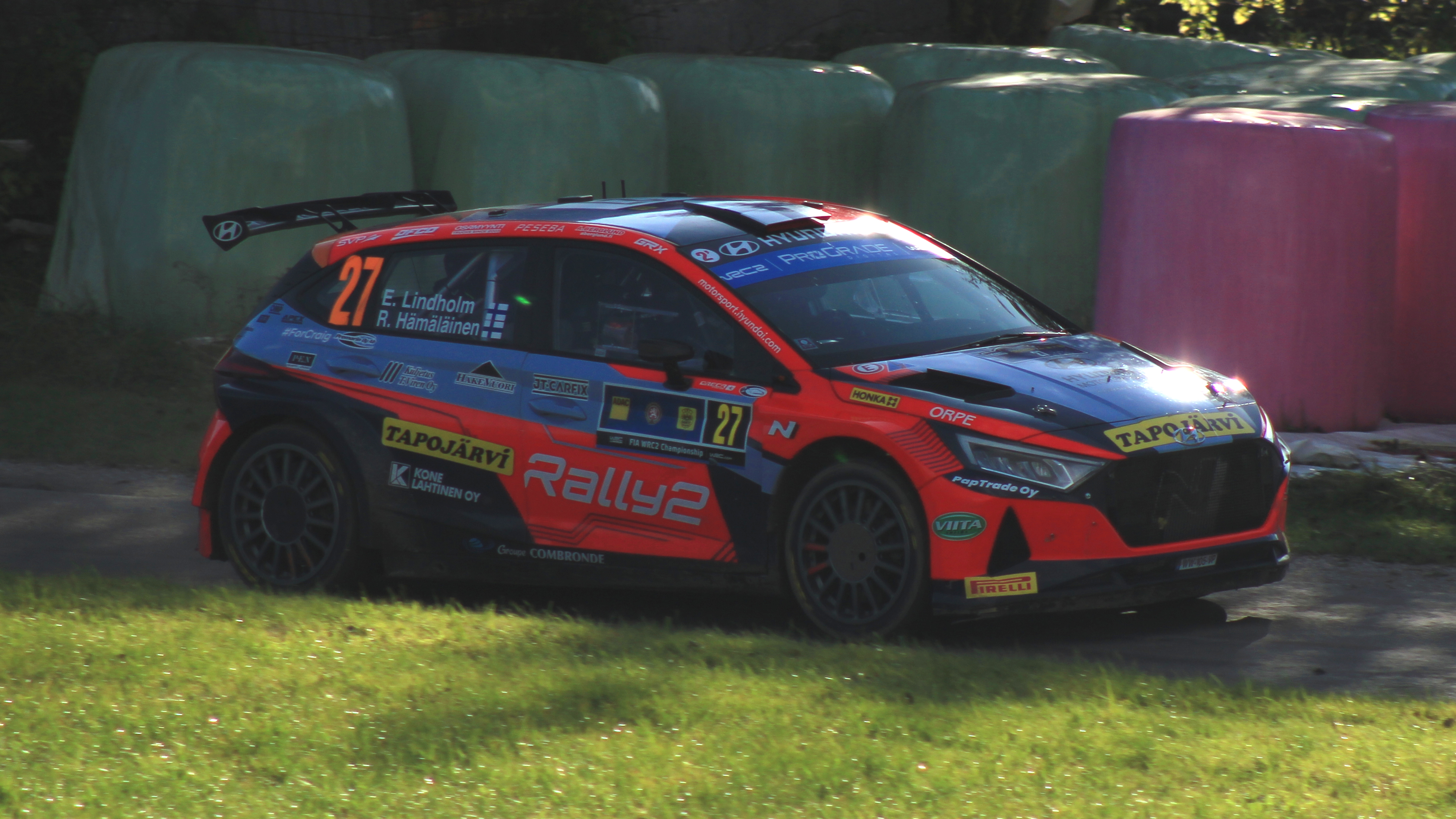

Personal information
- Nationality: (Finland) Finnish
- Born: 14 May 1988 (age 38)

World Rally Championship record
- Years active: 2013–2015, 2017–2018, 2020–2025
- Driver: (Finland) Jouni Virtanen (Finland) Mikko Lehessaari (Finland) Janne Tuohino (Finland) Kimmo Kurkela (Finland) Emil Lindholm
- Teams: Hyundai Motorsport
- Rallies: 38
- Championships: 0
- Rally wins: 0
- Podiums: 0
- Stage wins: 0
- First rally: 2013 Rally Finland
- Last rally: 2025 Rally Chile

Reeta Hämäläinen (born 14 May 1988) is a Finnish rallying co-driver. She is partnered with Emil Lindholm for Hyundai Motorsport in the WRC-2 category.

== Career ==
Hämäläinen began rallying competition in 2009 and made her WRC debut at the 2013 Rally Finland. In 2021, she started to navigate with Emil Lindholm in the WRC-2 championship, and they won the category in 2022. They were signed by Hyundai Motorsport in 2023.

== Rally results ==
=== WRC results ===
Year	Entrant	Car	1	2	3	4	5	6	7	8	9	10	11	12	13	14	Pos.	Points
2013	Jouni Virtanen	Mitsubishi Lancer Evo X	MON	SWE	MEX	POR	ARG	GRE	ITA	FIN; 57	GER	AUS	FRA	ESP	GBR		NC	0
2014	Jouni Virtanen	Ford Fiesta S2000	MON	SWE	MEX	POR	ARG	ITA	POL	FIN; 24	GER	AUS	FRA	ESP	GBR		NC	0
2015	Jouni Virtanen	Ford Fiesta S2000	MON	SWE	MEX	ARG	POR	ITA	POL	FIN; 32	GER	AUS	FRA	ESP	GBR		NC	0
2017	Hannu's Rally Team	Škoda Fabia R5	MON	SWE	MEX	FRA	ARG	POR	ITA	POL	FIN; Ret	GER	ESP	GBR	AUS		NC	0
2018	Toksport WRT	Škoda Fabia R5	MON	SWE; 16	MEX	FRA	ARG	POR	ITA	FIN	GER	TUR	GBR	ESP	AUS		NC	0
2020	JanPro	Ford Fiesta WRC	MON	SWE	MEX	EST; 25	TUR	ITA	MNZ								NC	0
2021	JanPro	Ford Fiesta WRC	MON	ARC; Ret	CRO												38th	1
2021	Emil Lindholm	Škoda Fabia Rally2 evo				POR; 27	ITA; Ret	KEN	EST; Ret	BEL	GRE; 14	FIN; 10	ESP; 12	MNZ			38th	1
2022	Toksport WRT 2	Škoda Fabia Rally2 evo	MON	SWE; 32	CRO; 9	POR	ITA	KEN	EST; 10	FIN; 8	BEL	GRE; 7	NZL	ESP; 14			15th	16
2022	Toksport WRT	Škoda Fabia Rally2 evo													JPN; 9		15th	16
2023	Toksport WRT	Škoda Fabia RS Rally2	MON	SWE; 16		CRO; 11	POR	ITA; Ret	KEN								21st	6
2023	Toksport WRT 2	Škoda Fabia Rally2 evo			MEX; 7												21st	6
2023	Hyundai Motorsport N	Hyundai i20 N Rally2								EST; 11	FIN; 20	GRE	CHL; Ret	EUR; Ret	JPN		21st	6
2024	Emil Lindholm	Hyundai i20 N Rally2	MON	SWE; 12	KEN	CRO; 18	POR	ITA; 46	POL	LAT; Ret	FIN; 55	GRE	CHL	EUR	JPN		NC	0
2025	Toksport WRT	Škoda Fabia RS Rally2	MON	SWE	KEN	ESP; 14	POR	ITA; Ret	GRE; 13	EST	FIN; 15	PAR	CHL; Ret	EUR	JPN	SAU	NC	0
2026	Toksport WRT	Škoda Fabia RS Rally2	MON	SWE	KEN	CRO; 10	ESP; 17	POR	JPN; 13	GRE	EST; 13	FIN; Ret	PAR	CHL	ITA; 24	SAU; C	32nd	1

=== WRC-2 results ===
Year	Entrant	Car	1	2	3	4	5	6	7	8	9	10	11	12	13	14	Pos.	Points
2018	Toksport WRT	Škoda Fabia R5	MON	SWE; 5	MEX	FRA	ARG	POR	ITA	FIN	GER	TUR	GBR	ESP	AUS		35th	10
2022	Toksport WRT 2	Škoda Fabia Rally2 evo	MON	SWE; 14	CRO; 3	POR	ITA	KEN	EST; 3	FIN; 1	BEL	GRE; 1	NZL	ESP; 4			1st	116
2022	Toksport WRT	Škoda Fabia Rally2 evo													JPN; 3		1st	116
2023	Toksport WRT	Škoda Fabia RS Rally2	MON	SWE; 7		CRO; 3	POR	ITA; Ret	KEN								9th	62
2023	Toksport WRT 2	Škoda Fabia Rally2 evo			MEX; 2												9th	62
2023	Hyundai Motorsport N	Hyundai i20 N Rally2								EST; 3	FIN; 13	GRE	CHL; Ret	EUR; Ret	JPN		9th	62
2024	Emil Lindholm	Hyundai i20 N Rally2	MON	SWE; 7	KEN	CRO; 8	POR	ITA; 24	POL	LAT; Ret	FIN; 20	GRE	CHL	EUR	JPN		29th	10
2025	Toksport WRT	Škoda Fabia RS Rally2	MON	SWE	KEN	ESP; 6	POR	ITA; Ret	GRE; 7	EST	FIN; 4	PAR	CHL; Ret	EUR	JPN	SAU	17th	26
2026	Toksport WRT	Škoda Fabia RS Rally2	MON	SWE	KEN	CRO; 7	ESP; 8	POR	JPN; 4	GRE	EST; 4	FIN; Ret	PAR	CHL	ITA; 13	SAU; C	14th	34

=== WRC-3 results ===
Year	Entrant	Car	1	2	3	4	5	6	7	8	9	10	11	12	Pos.	Points
2021	Emil Lindholm	Škoda Fabia Rally2 evo	MON	ARC	CRO	POR; 10	ITA; Ret	KEN	EST; Ret	BEL	GRE; 3	FIN; 1	ESP; 1 (Note: Emil Lindholm competed as the driver, but was identified as the co-driver on official documents. Therefore the points achieved by Lindholm are counted in the 2021 WRC-3 Co-drivers' standings.)	MNZ	5th	53
