= 2022 WRC2 Championship =

Motorsport championship

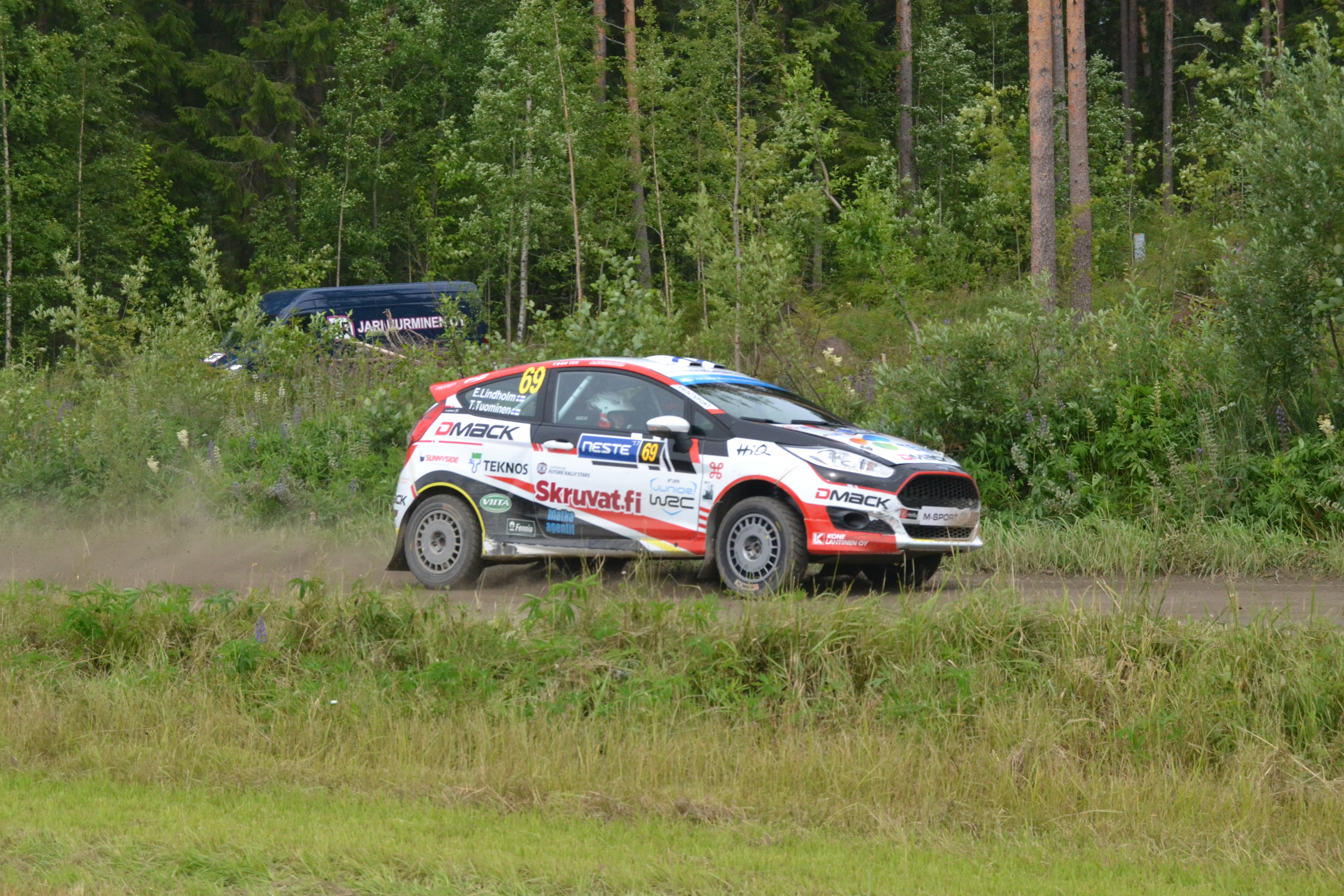
Emil Lindholm is the 2022 WRC-2 drivers' champion.

The 2022 FIA WRC2 Championship was the tenth season of WRC2, a rallying championship for organised and governed by the Fédération Internationale de l'Automobile as the second-highest tier of international rallying. The category was open to cars entered by teams and complying with Group Rally2. The championship began in January 2022 with the Rallye Monte-Carlo and concluded in November 2022 with Rally Japan, and ran in support of the 2022 World Rally Championship.

Andreas Mikkelsen and Torstein Eriksen were the defending 2021 drivers' and co-drivers' champions. Movisport were the defending teams' champions.

Emil Lindholm and Reeta Hämäläinen became 2022 WRC2 drivers' and co-drivers' champions, while Toksport WRT won the teams' championship.

== Calendar ==
A map showing the locations of the rallies of the 2022 championship. Event headquarters are marked with black dots.

The 2022 season was contested over thirteen rounds across Europe, Africa, Oceania, and Asia.

Round	Start date	Finish date	Rally	Rally headquarters	Surface	Stages	Distance	Ref.
1	20 January	23 January	(Monaco) Rallye Automobile Monte Carlo	Monte Carlo, Monaco	Mixed (Note: The Monte Carlo Rally is run on a tarmac and snow surface.)	17	296.03 km	
2	24 February	27 February	Rally Sweden	Umeå, Västerbotten County	Snow	17	264.81 km	
3	21 April	24 April	Croatia Rally	Zagreb	Tarmac	20	291.84 km	
4	19 May	22 May	Rally de Portugal	Matosinhos, Porto	Gravel	21	338.34 km	
5	2 June	5 June	(Italy) Rally Italia Sardegna	Alghero, Sardinia	Gravel	21	307.91 km	
6	23 June	26 June	Safari Rally Kenya	Nairobi	Gravel	19	363.44 km	
7	14 July	17 July	Rally Estonia	Tartu, Tartu County	Gravel	24	314.26 km	
8	4 August	7 August	Rally Finland	Jyväskylä, Central Finland	Gravel	22	322.61 km	
9	18 August	21 August	Ypres Rally Belgium	Ypres, West Flanders	Tarmac	20	281.58 km	
10	8 September	11 September	Acropolis Rally Greece	Lamia, Central Greece	Gravel	16	303.30 km	
11	29 September	2 October	Rally New Zealand	Auckland, North Island	Gravel	17	279.80 km	
12	20 October	23 October	(Spain) RACC Rally Catalunya de España	Salou, Catalonia	Tarmac	19	293.77 km	
13	10 November	13 November	Rally Japan	Toyota, Chūbu region	Tarmac	19	283.27 km	

=== Location changes ===
The headquarters of the Monte Carlo Rally moved from Gap, Hautes-Alpes to Monaco alone. The rally was previously headquartered solely in Monaco in 2006. Rally Sweden returned to the championship after a one-year absence. Because of a lack of snow, the organisers moved the rally headquarters for the first time in WRC history. It relocated from Torsby, Värmland northwards to Umeå in Västerbotten County. The rally was initially scheduled to cover 303.74 km (188.7 mi) in nineteen special stages, but it was reduced to seventeen in a total of 264.81 km (164.5 mi) due to reindeer movements. Rally Italia Sardegna relocated its rally base back to Alghero following a one-off headquarter in Olbia for the 2021 event.

=== Calendar changes ===
Rally New Zealand returned to the championship for the first time since 2012. The rally had also secured a spot in the calendar in 2020, but the event was not held in response to the COVID-19 pandemic. Rally Japan took the final spot in the calendar. It was scheduled as the final round in 2020 and 2021, before being called off due to the COVID-19 pandemic. Rally Mexico had contracts to hold the WRC event in 2022 and 2023, but the rally was not included on the calendar. A national event was held in the bid of a 2023 return. Rally Chile found itself in a similar situation to Mexico as their contract with WRC Promoter GmbH lasted till 2022. Chile had previously hosted the event in 2019. Rally GB was bidding for a 2022 return as the event was planned to hold in Northern Ireland, but the proposal was ultimately failed.

== Entries ==
The following teams and crews were officially entered into the 2022 WRC2:

Crews entered by or via teams
Entrant	Car	Driver		Co-driver		Rounds
Entrant	Car	Driver name	Category	Co-driver name	Category	Rounds
(Estonia) ALM Motorsport	Volkswagen Polo GTI R5	(Estonia) Georg Linnamäe	Junior	(United Kingdom) James Morgan		2–5, 8, 10, 12
(Estonia) ALM Motorsport	Volkswagen Polo GTI R5	(Estonia) Georg Linnamäe	Junior	(United Kingdom) Craig Drew		7
(South Korea) Hyundai Motorsport N	Hyundai i20 N Rally2	(Sweden) Oliver Solberg		(United Kingdom) Elliott Edmondson		4
(South Korea) Hyundai Motorsport N	Hyundai i20 N Rally2	(Finland) Teemu Suninen		(Finland) Mikko Markkula		4–5, 7–8, 10, 12–13
(South Korea) Hyundai Motorsport N	Hyundai i20 N Rally2	(Paraguay) Fabrizio Zaldivar	Junior	(Spain) Carlos Del Barrio		4–5
(South Korea) Hyundai Motorsport N	Hyundai i20 N Rally2	(Paraguay) Fabrizio Zaldivar	Junior	(Argentina) Marcelo Der Ohannesian		7–8, 10, 12–13
(United Kingdom) M-Sport Ford WRT	Ford Fiesta Rally2	(Sweden) Mattias Adielsson		(Sweden) David Arhusiander		2
(United Kingdom) M-Sport Ford WRT	Ford Fiesta Rally2	(Finland) Jari Huttunen		(Finland) Mikko Lukka		2–3, 5, 7, 9, 12
(United Kingdom) M-Sport Ford WRT	Ford Fiesta Rally2	(Australia) Luke Anear		(United Kingdom) Allan Harryman		12
(France) PH Sport	Citroën C3 Rally2	(France) Yohan Rossel		(France) Benjamin Boulloud		1
(France) PH Sport	Citroën C3 Rally2	(France) Yohan Rossel		(France) Valentin Sarreaud		3–5, 9–10
(France) PH Sport	Citroën C3 Rally2	(France) Yohan Rossel		(France) Arnaud Dunand		12
(France) Saintéloc Junior Team	Citroën C3 Rally2	(France) Eric Camilli		(France) Yannick Roche		1
(France) Saintéloc Junior Team	Citroën C3 Rally2	(France) Eric Camilli		(France) Thibault de la Haye		3–5
(France) Saintéloc Junior Team	Citroën C3 Rally2	(United States) Sean Johnston		(United States) Alexander Kihurani		1, 3–4, 6–7, 13
(France) Saintéloc Junior Team	Citroën C3 Rally2	(Germany) Armin Kremer	Masters	(Germany) Ella Kremer		11
(Germany) Toksport WRT	Škoda Fabia Rally2 evo	(Bolivia) Marco Bulacia	Junior	(Argentina) Marcelo Der Ohannesian		1–2, 4–5
(Germany) Toksport WRT	Škoda Fabia Rally2 evo	(Bolivia) Marco Bulacia	Junior	(Spain) Diego Vallejo		7, 9
(Germany) Toksport WRT	Škoda Fabia Rally2 evo	(Norway) Eyvind Brynildsen		(Norway) Roger Eilertsen		10
(Germany) Toksport WRT	Škoda Fabia Rally2 evo	(Norway) Andreas Mikkelsen		(Norway) Torstein Eriksen		1–2, 4–5, 7, 9–10
(Germany) Toksport WRT	Škoda Fabia Rally2 evo	(Finland) Emil Lindholm	Junior	(Finland) Reeta Hämäläinen		13
(Germany) Toksport WRT	Škoda Fabia Rally2 evo	(Finland) Sami Pajari	Junior	(Finland) Enni Mälkönen		13
(Germany) Toksport WRT 2	Škoda Fabia Rally2 evo	Nikolay Gryazin (Note: Nikolay Gryazin is a Russian national, but competed as a neutral member of the Russian Automobile Federation (RAF), after the Court of Arbitration for Sport upheld a ban on Russia competing at World Championships. The ban was implemented by the World Anti-Doping Agency in response to state-sponsored doping of Russian athletes. In its International Sporting Code, the FIA adheres to decisions and rulings on doping made by the agency and court.)	Junior	Konstantin Aleksandrov (Note: Konstantin Aleksandrov is a Russian national, but competed as a neutral member of the Russian Automobile Federation (RAF), after the Court of Arbitration for Sport upheld a ban on Russia competing at World Championships. The ban was implemented by the World Anti-Doping Agency in response to state-sponsored doping of Russian athletes. In its International Sporting Code, the FIA adheres to decisions and rulings on doping made by the agency and court.)		1–2
(Germany) Toksport WRT 2	Škoda Fabia Rally2 evo	Nikolay Gryazin (Note: Nikolay Gryazin is a Russian national, but competes as an Authorised Neutral Athlete in accordance with recommendations made by the International Olympic Committee, following a decision by the FIA to ban all connections with Russia following the Russian invasion of Ukraine.)	Junior	Konstantin Aleksandrov (Note: Konstantin Aleksandrov is a Russian national, but competes as an Authorised Neutral Athlete in accordance with recommendations made by the International Olympic Committee, following a decision by the FIA to ban all connections with Russia following the Russian invasion of Ukraine.)		3, 5, 7–8, 10, 12
(Germany) Toksport WRT 2	Škoda Fabia Rally2 evo	(Finland) Emil Lindholm	Junior	(Finland) Reeta Hämäläinen		2–3, 7–8, 10, 12
(Germany) Toksport WRT 2	Škoda Fabia Rally2 evo	(Bolivia) Bruno Bulacia	Junior	(Brazil) Gabriel Morales		13
(Germany) Toksport WRT 2	Škoda Fabia Rally2 evo	(Italy) Mauro Miele	Masters	(Italy) Luca Beltrame		13
(Czech Republic) Yacco ACCR Team	Ford Fiesta Rally2	(Czech Republic) Erik Cais	Junior	(Czech Republic) Petr Těšínský		1, 3–5
(Czech Republic) Yacco ACCR Team	Volkswagen Polo GTI R5	(France) Pierre Ragues		(France) Julien Pesenti		1, 3

Private entries
Manufacturer	Car	Driver		Co-driver		Rounds
Manufacturer	Car	Driver name	Category	Co-driver name	Category	Rounds
Citroën	C3 Rally2	(Japan) Toshi Arai	Masters	(Japan) Naoya Tanaka		13
Citroën	C3 Rally2	(Spain) Alejandro Cachón	Junior	(Spain) Alejandro López Fernández	Junior	12
Citroën	C3 Rally2	(Portugal) Paulo Caldeira		(Portugal) Ana Gonçalves		4
Citroën	C3 Rally2	(France) Patrick Déjean		(France) Yannick Jammes		12
Citroën	C3 Rally2	(Portugal) José Pedro Fontes		(Portugal) Inês Ponte		4
Citroën	C3 Rally2	(Japan) Satoshi Imai		(Japan) Shizuka Takehara		13
Citroën	C3 Rally2	(Greece) Chrysostomos Karellis		(Greece) Leonidas Machairas		10
Citroën	C3 Rally2	(France) Stéphane Lefebvre		(France) Andy Malfoy		1, (Note: Entrant was ' DG Sport Compétition' for round 1) 3–4, 9
Citroën	C3 Rally2	(France) Jonathan Rieu		(France) Jules Escartefigue		10
Citroën	C3 Rally2	(Spain) Jan Solans	Junior	(Spain) Rodrigo Sanjuan		4–5, 12
Citroën	C3 Rally2	(Belgium) Davy Vanneste		(Belgium) Kris D'alleine		9
Citroën	C3 Rally2	(Spain) Alexander Villanueva	Masters	(Spain) Rodrigo Sanjuan		2
Ford	Fiesta R5	(France) Patrick Déjean		(France) Yannick Jammes		4
Ford	Fiesta R5	(Portugal) Ricardo Filipe		(Portugal) Fernando Almeida		4
Ford	Fiesta R5	(Zambia) Leroy Gomes		(Zambia) Urshlla Gomes		6
Ford	Fiesta R5	(Kenya) Karan Patel		(Kenya) Tauseef Khan		6
Ford	Fiesta R5	(Greece) Georgios Vasilakis	Masters	(Greece) Konstantinos Soukoulis		10
Ford	Fiesta R5	(Netherlands) Henk Vossen	Masters	(Netherlands) Hans van Goor	Masters	3, 9
Ford	Fiesta R5	(Netherlands) Henk Vossen	Masters	(Netherlands) Radboud van Hoek	Masters	12
Ford	Fiesta Rally2	(Sweden) Per-Gunnar Andersson		(Sweden) Anders Fredriksson		2
Ford	Fiesta Rally2	(Australia) Luke Anear		(Australia) Andrew Sarandis		5, 7, 11
Ford	Fiesta Rally2	(Australia) Luke Anear		(United Kingdom) Stuart Loudon		13
Ford	Fiesta Rally2	(New Zealand) Todd Bawden	Masters	(New Zealand) Paul Burborough	Masters	11
Ford	Fiesta Rally2	(Republic of Ireland) Eamonn Boland	Masters	(Republic of Ireland) Michael Joseph Morrissey	Masters	1–2, 9, 12–13
Ford	Fiesta Rally2	(Poland) Jarosław Kołtun		(Poland) Ireneusz Pleskot		2
Ford	Fiesta Rally2	(Estonia) Priit Koik		(Estonia) Kristo Tamm		7
Ford	Fiesta Rally2	(Czech Republic) Martin Prokop		(Czech Republic) Michal Ernst		4–5, 8, 10
Ford	Fiesta Rally2	(Czech Republic) Martin Prokop		(Czech Republic) Zdeněk Jůrka		6
Hyundai	i20 R5	(France) Laurent Battut	Masters	(Belgium) Eric Gressens	Masters	4–5
Hyundai	i20 R5	(Kenya) Piero Canobbio		(Italy) Fabrizia Pons		6
Hyundai	i20 R5	(Portugal) Lucas Simões	Junior	(Portugal) Nuno Almeida		4
Hyundai	i20 N Rally2	(Greece) Lambros Athanasoulas		(Greece) Nikolaos Zakchaios		10
Hyundai	i20 N Rally2	(Switzerland) Olivier Burri	Masters	(France) Anderson Levratti		9
Hyundai	i20 N Rally2	(Belgium) Pieter Jan Michiel Cracco	Junior	(Belgium) Jasper Vermeulen	Junior	9
Hyundai	i20 N Rally2	(Spain) Pepe López	Junior	(Spain) Borja Rozada		12
Hyundai	i20 N Rally2	(Portugal) Bruno Magalhães		(Portugal) Carlos Magalhães		4
Hyundai	i20 N Rally2	(Republic of Ireland) Josh McErlean	Junior	(Republic of Ireland) James Fulton	Junior	2, 4–5, 7–9, 12
Hyundai	i20 N Rally2	(Portugal) Pedro Meireles		(Portugal) Pedro Alves		4
Hyundai	i20 N Rally2	(Luxembourg) Grégoire Munster	Junior	(Belgium) Louis Louka	Junior	1, 3, 9–10, 12–13
Hyundai	i20 N Rally2	(New Zealand) Hayden Paddon		(New Zealand) John Kennard		7–8, 11
Hyundai	i20 N Rally2	(France) Frédéric Rosati	Masters	(France) Philippe Marchetto	Masters	1
Hyundai	i20 N Rally2	(France) Frédéric Rosati	Masters	(Belgium) Stéphane Prévot	Masters	2, 4–5
Hyundai	i20 N Rally2	(France) Frédéric Rosati	Masters	(France) Loris Pascaud		10, 13
Hyundai	i20 N Rally2	(Republic of Ireland) Paul Rowley		(Republic of Ireland) Andy Hayes		4
Hyundai	i20 N Rally2	(Spain) Nil Solans	Junior	(Spain) Axel Coronado Jiménez		12
Hyundai	i20 N Rally2	(Greece) Emmanouil Stefanis		(Greece) Konstantinos Stefanis		10
Hyundai	i20 N Rally2	(Finland) Riku Tahko		(Finland) Sami Ryynänen		8
Hyundai	i20 N Rally2	(Portugal) Ricardo Teodósio		(Portugal) José Teixeira		4
Škoda	Fabia R5	(Kenya) Raajpal Bharij		(Kenya) Jasneil Ghataure		6
Škoda	Fabia R5	(Portugal) Manuel Castro		(Portugal) Ricardo Cunha		4
Škoda	Fabia R5	(Italy) Carlo Covi	Masters	(Italy) Michela Lorigiola	Masters	1, 3, 10
Škoda	Fabia R5	(Italy) Carlo Covi	Masters	(Italy) Andrea Budoia		5
Škoda	Fabia R5	(India) Gaurav Gill		(Brazil) Gabriel Morales		6, 8, 10
Škoda	Fabia R5	(New Zealand) Kingsley Jones	Masters	(New Zealand) Waverley Jones		11
Škoda	Fabia R5	(Finland) Heikki Kovalainen		(Japan) Sae Kitagawa		13
Škoda	Fabia R5	(Italy) Filippo Marchino		(Italy) Roberto Briani		3
Škoda	Fabia R5	(Italy) Filippo Marchino		(Italy) Pietro Elia Ometto		12
Škoda	Fabia R5	(Brazil) Paulo Nobre	Masters	(Brazil) Gabriel Morales		3–4
Škoda	Fabia R5	(Sweden) Joakim Roman	Masters	(Sweden) Jörgen Fornander	Masters	2
Škoda	Fabia R5	(Portugal) Diogo Salvi	Masters	(Portugal) Miguel Ramalho	Masters	4
Škoda	Fabia R5	(Portugal) Diogo Salvi	Masters	(Portugal) Hugo Magalhães		10
Škoda	Fabia R5	(Greece) Dionysios Spanos		(Greece) Sotirios Gotovos		10
Škoda	Fabia R5	(New Zealand) Shane Van Gisbergen		(Australia) Glen Weston		11
Škoda	Fabia R5	(Japan) Osamu Fukunaga	Masters	(Japan) Misako Saida		13
Škoda	Fabia Rally2 evo	(Japan) Osamu Fukunaga	Masters	(Japan) Misako Saida		3, 9
Škoda	Fabia Rally2 evo	(Oman) Hamed Al-Wahaibi	Masters	(Austria) Ilka Minor		10
Škoda	Fabia Rally2 evo	(Portugal) Pedro Almeida	Junior	(Portugal) Mário Castro		4
Škoda	Fabia Rally2 evo	(Portugal) Armindo Araújo		(Portugal) Luís Ramalho		4
Škoda	Fabia Rally2 evo	(Italy) Fabrizio Arengi	Masters	(Italy) Massimiliano Bosi		1, 3–4, 10, 12
Škoda	Fabia Rally2 evo	(Finland) Teemu Asunmaa		(Finland) Ville Mannisenmäki		8
Škoda	Fabia Rally2 evo	(Australia) Harry Bates	Junior	(Australia) John McCarthy		11
Škoda	Fabia Rally2 evo	(Belgium) Sébastien Bedoret	Junior	(France) François Gilbert		9
Škoda	Fabia Rally2 evo	(Italy) Pablo Biolghini		(Italy) Stefano Pudda		5
Škoda	Fabia Rally2 evo	(Bolivia) Bruno Bulacia	Junior	(Spain) Marc Martí		2, 4–5, 7, 10
Škoda	Fabia Rally2 evo	(Bolivia) Bruno Bulacia	Junior	(Spain) Carlos del Barrio		12
Škoda	Fabia Rally2 evo	(Peru) Eduardo Castro		(Argentina) Fernando Mussano		10
Škoda	Fabia Rally2 evo	(Greece) Efthymios Chalkias		(Greece) Andreas Vigkos		10
Škoda	Fabia Rally2 evo	(Poland) Daniel Chwist		(Poland) Kamil Heller		5, 12
Škoda	Fabia Rally2 evo	(Portugal) Miguel Correia		(Portugal) Jorge Carvalho		4
Škoda	Fabia Rally2 evo	(Spain) Miguel Diaz Aboitiz	Masters	(Spain) Jordi Hereu		4–5, 9–12
Škoda	Fabia Rally2 evo	(Chile) Emilio Fernández		(Spain) Axel Coronado		4–5, 7
Škoda	Fabia Rally2 evo	(Mexico) Benito Guerra		(Spain) Daniel Cué		3
Škoda	Fabia Rally2 evo	(Mexico) Benito Guerra		(Spain) Sara Fernandez		4
Škoda	Fabia Rally2 evo	(Finland) Mikko Heikkilä	Junior	(Finland) Samu Vaaleri	Junior	3, 8, 12
Škoda	Fabia Rally2 evo	(New Zealand) Raana Horan		(New Zealand) Michael Connor		11
Škoda	Fabia Rally2 evo	(New Zealand) Ben Hunt		(New Zealand) Tony Rawstorn		11
Škoda	Fabia Rally2 evo	(United Kingdom) Chris Ingram	Junior	(United Kingdom) Ross Whittock		1
Škoda	Fabia Rally2 evo	(United Kingdom) Chris Ingram	Junior	(United Kingdom) Craig Drew		3–5, 9–10
Škoda	Fabia Rally2 evo	(Estonia) Gregor Jeets	Junior	(Estonia) Timo Taniel		7
Škoda	Fabia Rally2 evo	(Sweden) Jörgen Jonasson		(Sweden) Nicklas Jonasson		2
Škoda	Fabia Rally2 evo	(Poland) Kajetan Kajetanowicz		(Poland) Maciek Szczepaniak		3–4, 6–7, 11–13
Škoda	Fabia Rally2 evo	(Greece) Georgios Kechagias		(Greece) Dimitrios Sainis		10
Škoda	Fabia Rally2 evo	(Austria) Johannes Keferböck		(Austria) Ilka Minor		1, 3, 12
Škoda	Fabia Rally2 evo	(Germany) Armin Kremer	Masters	(Germany) Timo Gottschalk		3–4, 9, 10
Škoda	Fabia Rally2 evo	(Germany) Armin Kremer	Masters	(Germany) Ella Kremer		5, 12
Škoda	Fabia Rally2 evo	(Belgium) Freddy Loix	Masters	(Belgium) Pieter Tsjoen		1, 5, 8–9
Škoda	Fabia Rally2 evo	(Poland) Mikołaj Marczyk	Junior	(Poland) Szymon Gospodarczyk		3–5, 7–8, 12
Škoda	Fabia Rally2 evo	(Chile) Jorge Martínez		(Argentina) Alberto Álvarez Nicholson		10
Škoda	Fabia Rally2 evo	(Italy) Mauro Miele	Masters	(Italy) Luca Beltrame		1–3, 5, 7, 10, 12
Škoda	Fabia Rally2 evo	(Italy) Maurizio Morato		(Italy) Enrico Gallinaro		1
Škoda	Fabia Rally2 evo	(Slovenia) Aljoša Novak	Junior	(Slovenia) Uroš Ocvirk		3
Škoda	Fabia Rally2 evo	(Italy) Enrico Oldrati	Junior	(Italy) Elia De Guio	Junior	2
Škoda	Fabia Rally2 evo	(Finland) Sami Pajari	Junior	(Finland) Enni Mälkönen		5, 8, 12
Škoda	Fabia Rally2 evo	(Italy) Silvano Patera		(Italy) Danilo Fappani		5
Škoda	Fabia Rally2 evo	(Spain) Eduard Pons Suñe		(Spain) Alberto Chamorro		5, 12
Škoda	Fabia Rally2 evo	(Croatia) Niko Pulić	Masters	(Croatia) Aleksandra Kovačić		3
Škoda	Fabia Rally2 evo	(Hungary) János Puskádi		(Hungary) Barnabás Gódor		10
Škoda	Fabia Rally2 evo	(Kenya) Amaanraj Rai	Junior	(United Kingdom) Gurdeep Panesar		6
Škoda	Fabia Rally2 evo	(Belgium) Niels Reynvoet		(Belgium) Diederik Pattyn		9
Škoda	Fabia Rally2 evo	(Italy) Simone Romagna		(Italy) Luca Addondi		5
Škoda	Fabia Rally2 evo	(Greece) Panagiotis Roustemis	Junior	(Greece) Christos Bakloris		10
Škoda	Fabia Rally2 evo	(Greece) Jourdan Serderidis	Masters	(Belgium) Frédéric Miclotte		5
Škoda	Fabia Rally2 evo	(United Kingdom) Neil Simpson		(United Kingdom) Michael Gibson		3, 9
Škoda	Fabia Rally2 evo	(Italy) Francesco Tali	Masters	(Italy) Cristina Caldart		5
Škoda	Fabia Rally2 evo	(Portugal) Francisco Teixeira	Masters	(Portugal) João Serôdio		4
Škoda	Fabia Rally2 evo	(Greece) Vasileios Velanis		(Greece) Ioannis Velanis		10
Škoda	Fabia Rally2 evo	(Spain) Alexander Villanueva	Masters	(Spain) José Murado		4
Škoda	Fabia Rally2 evo	(Kenya) Aakif Virani		(Kenya) Azhar Bhatti		6
Volkswagen	Polo GTI R5	(Saudi Arabia) Rakan Al-Rashed		(Portugal) Hugo Magalhães		2, 4–5, 12
Volkswagen	Polo GTI R5	(Switzerland) Olivier Burri	Masters	(France) Anderson Levratti		1, 3
Volkswagen	Polo GTI R5	(Estonia) Egon Kaur		(Estonia) Silver Simm		2, 7–8
Volkswagen	Polo GTI R5	(New Zealand) Andy Martin	Masters	(New Zealand) Matt Hayward		11
Volkswagen	Polo GTI R5	(Finland) Eerik Pietarinen	Junior	(Finland) Antti Linnaketo		2, 4–5, 8
Volkswagen	Polo GTI R5	(France) Jean-Michel Raoux	Masters	(France) Laurent Magat	Masters	1, 4–5, 10, 12–13
Volkswagen	Polo GTI R5	(France) Stéphane Sarrazin		(France) Jacques-Julien Renucci		12
Volkswagen	Polo GTI R5	(Poland) Michał Sołowow	Masters	(Poland) Maciek Baran		2
Volkswagen	Polo GTI R5	(Cyprus) Alexandros Tsouloftas		(United Kingdom) Ross Whittock		10
Volkswagen	Polo GTI R5	(Norway) Ole Christian Veiby		(Norway) Stig Rune Skjærmoen		2
Volkswagen	Polo GTI R5	(Belgium) Vincent Verschueren		(Belgium) Filip Cuvelier		9

== Regulation changes ==
=== Sporting Regulations ===
The following titles were contested within the WRC2 category in 2022:

- Open Championship for Drivers
- Open Championship for Co-Drivers
- Championship for Teams
- Junior Championship for Drivers
- Junior Championship for Co-Drivers
- Masters Cup for Drivers
- Masters Cup for Co-Drivers

In a change to 2021 rules, drivers could enter the Open and Junior championships independently instead of having to enter through a team. Teams wishing to compete in the championship for teams followed the same rules. For WRC2 Junior championships, drivers must have been born on or after 1 January 1992 with no extra registration necessary. Juniors must not have previously won WRC2 or WRC3, or ever been nominated to score points in the WRC Manufacturers' Championship. The Masters Cup will run alongside the open championship for drivers born on or before 1 January 1972 and who have registered to compete in the cup.

For the Open and Junior Driver and Co-Driver championships, points will be considered from the best 6 of 7 rounds entered. For Teams and the Masters Cup, points from the best 5 of 6 rallies entered in Europe will count, plus bonus points from a seventh round entered outside Europe.

== Results and standings ==
=== Season summary ===
Round	Event	Winning driver	Winning co-driver	Winning entrant	Winning time	Report	Ref.
1	(Monaco) Rallye Automobile Monte Carlo	(Norway) Andreas Mikkelsen	(Norway) Torstein Eriksen	(Germany) Toksport WRT	3:12:06.6	Report	
2	Rally Sweden	(Norway) Andreas Mikkelsen	(Norway) Torstein Eriksen	(Germany) Toksport WRT	2:17:56.0	Report	
3	Croatia Rally	(France) Yohan Rossel	(France) Valentin Sarreaud	(France) PH-Sport	2:58:22.5	Report	
4	Rally de Portugal	(France) Yohan Rossel	(France) Valentin Sarreaud	(France) PH-Sport	3:58:08.1	Report	
5	(Italy) Rally Italia Sardegna	Nikolay Gryazin	Konstantin Aleksandrov	(Germany) Toksport WRT 2	3:18:36.8	Report	
6	Safari Rally Kenya	(Poland) Kajetan Kajetanowicz	(Poland) Maciej Szczepaniak	(Poland) Kajetan Kajetanowicz	4:16:02.5	Report	
7	Rally Estonia	(Norway) Andreas Mikkelsen	(Norway) Torstein Eriksen	(Germany) Toksport WRT	3:05:30.8	Report	
8	Rally Finland	(Finland) Emil Lindholm	(Finland) Reeta Hämäläinen	(Germany) Toksport WRT 2	2:33:43.6	Report	
9	Ypres Rally Belgium	(France) Stéphane Lefebvre	(France) Andy Malfoy	(France) Stéphane Lefebvre	2:35:39.6	Report	
10	Acropolis Rally Greece	(Finland) Emil Lindholm	(Finland) Reeta Hämäläinen	(Germany) Toksport WRT 2	3:42:38.6	Report	
11	Rally New Zealand	(New Zealand) Hayden Paddon	(New Zealand) John Kennard	(New Zealand) Hayden Paddon	2:58:05.1	Report	
12	(Spain) RACC Rally Catalunya de España	(Finland) Teemu Suninen	(Finland) Mikko Markkula	(South Korea) Hyundai Motorsport N	2:54:29.6	Report	
13	Rally Japan	(Luxembourg) Grégoire Munster	(Belgium) Louis Louka	(Luxembourg) Grégoire Munster	2:51:43.1	Report	

=== Scoring system ===
Points are awarded to the top ten classified finishers in each event. Power Stage points are also awarded in the drivers' and co-drivers' championships, with three points awarded to the first-place finisher on the stage, two to second place, and one to third. A team has to enter two cars to score points in an event. Drivers and teams must nominate a scoring rally when they enter the event and the best six scores from seven nominated rallies will count towards the final classification. Registered drivers are able to enter additional rallies with Priority 2 status without scoring points.

Position	1st	2nd	3rd	4th	5th	6th	7th	8th	9th	10th
Points	25	18	15	12	10	8	6	4	2	1

=== FIA WRC2 Open Championship for Drivers ===
Pos.	Driver	MON (Monaco)	SWE (Sweden)	CRO (Croatia)	POR (Portugal)	ITA (Italy)	KEN (Kenya)	EST (Estonia)	FIN (Finland)	BEL (Belgium)	GRC (Greece)	NZL (New Zealand)	ESP (Spain)	JPN (Japan)	Points
1	(Finland) Emil Lindholm		14^{1}	3^{1}				3^{3}	1^{2}		1		4^{1}	3	116
2	(Norway) Andreas Mikkelsen	1^{3}	1		Ret	Ret		1^{1}		2^{1}	7^{1}				109
3	(Poland) Kajetan Kajetanowicz			2	2^{2}		1^{1}	5				2^{2}	6	Ret	104
4	(France) Yohan Rossel	6^{1}		1	1	11^{2}				3^{2}	Ret		2		98
5	Nikolay Gryazin	3	Ret	4	NC	1		WD	DNS	NC	2		3		85
6	(Finland) Teemu Suninen				Ret	25		2^{2}	DSQ		10^{2}		1	2^{2}	68
7	(United Kingdom) Chris Ingram	7		5	3	4^{3}				4	Ret				56
8	(Finland) Jari Huttunen		3	18		3^{1}		4		Ret			5		55
9	(Luxembourg) Grégoire Munster	5^{2}		25^{3}						5	Ret		12	1	48
10	(New Zealand) Hayden Paddon							Ret	3			1^{1}			43
11	(United States) Sean Johnston	4		11	Ret		2^{2}	10						6	41
12	(France) Stéphane Lefebvre	Ret		6^{2}	WD					1^{3}					36
13	(Estonia) Egon Kaur		4					12	2						30
14	(Finland) Sami Pajari					5			10^{1}				7	5	30
15	(Finland) Eerik Pietarinen		6^{3}		17	6			5^{3}						28
16	(Poland) Mikołaj Marczyk			9	4	8		15	6				10		27
17	(Paraguay) Fabrizio Zaldivar				14	22		9	7		5		8	14^{3}	23
18	(Czech Republic) Erik Cais	2		8	20	Ret									22
19	(Spain) Jan Solans				21^{3}	2							9		21
20	(Norway) Ole Christian Veiby		2												18
21	(Estonia) Georg Linnamäe		5^{2}	21	Ret	Ret		7		NC	12		13		18
22	(Kenya) Amanraaj Rai						3^{3}								16
23	(Cyprus) Alexandros Tsouloftas										3^{3}				16
24	(New Zealand) Shane van Gisbergen											3^{3}			16
25	(Czech Republic) Martin Prokop				7	9	Ret		8		8				16
26	(Germany) Armin Kremer			12	Ret	DNS				8	11	5	16		14
27	(Chile) Emilio Fernández				24	7		6							14
28	(Italy) Mauro Miele	8	10	14		Ret		13					17	7^{1}	14
29	(Kenya) Aakif Virani						4								12
30	(Finland) Teemu Asunmaa								4						12
31	(Norway) Eyvind Brynildsen										4				12
32	(Australia) Harry Bates											4			12
33	(Finland) Heikki Kovalainen													4	12
34	(Portugal) Armindo Araújo				5										10
35	(Portugal) Ricardo Teodósio				6										8
36	(India) Gaurav Gill						Ret		32		6				8
37	(Belgium) Vincent Verschueren									6					8
38	(New Zealand) Todd Bawden											6			8
39	(Australia) Luke Anear					21		14				7	26	10	7
40	(France) Eric Camilli	Ret		7	Ret	WD									6
41	(Sweden) Jörgen Jonasson		7												6
42	(Belgium) Sébastien Bedoret									7					6
43	(Belgium) Freddy Loix	10				10			9	9					6
44	(France) Jean-Michel Raoux	12			8	14					16		19	15	4
45	(Republic of Ireland) Josh McErlean		13		19	20		8	13	Ret			11		4
46	(Poland) Michał Sołowow		8												4
47	(New Zealand) Ben Hunt											8			4
48	(Japan) Osamu Fukunaga			26						18				8	4
49	(Sweden) Oliver Solberg				25^{1}										3
50	(France) Frédéric Rosati	15	Ret		9	Ret					Ret			13	2
51	(Switzerland) Olivier Burri	9		15						14					2
52	(Bolivia) Bruno Bulacia		9		22	Ret		Ret			22		21	11	2
53	(Greece) Lambros Athanassoulas										9				2
54	(New Zealand) Andy Martin											9			2
55	(Republic of Ireland) Eamonn Boland	13	16							15			23	9	2
56	(Spain) Pepe López												15^{2}		2
57	(Saudi Arabia) Rakan Al-Rashed		Ret		10	12							29		1
58	(Finland) Mikko Heikkilä			10					12				14		1
59	(Spain) Miguel Díaz-Aboitiz				12	24				17	20	10	27		1
60	(Belgium) Davy Vanneste									10					1
61	(Spain) Alejandro Cachón												24^{3}		1
Pos.	Driver	MON (Monaco)	SWE (Sweden)	CRO (Croatia)	POR (Portugal)	ITA (Italy)	KEN (Kenya)	EST (Estonia)	FIN (Finland)	BEL (Belgium)	GRC (Greece)	NZL (New Zealand)	ESP (Spain)	JPN (Japan)	Points

Key
Colour	Result
Gold	Winner
Silver	2nd place
Bronze	3rd place
Green	Points finish
Blue	Non-points finish
Blue	Non-classified finish (NC)
Purple	Did not finish (Ret)
Black	Excluded (EX)
Black	Disqualified (DSQ)
White	Did not start (DNS)
White	Cancelled (C)
Blank	Withdrew entry from the event (WD)

Notes:
^{1 2 3} – Power Stage position

=== FIA WRC2 Open Championship for Co-Drivers ===
Pos.	Co-Driver	MON (Monaco)	SWE (Sweden)	CRO (Croatia)	POR (Portugal)	ITA (Italy)	KEN (Kenya)	EST (Estonia)	FIN (Finland)	BEL (Belgium)	GRC (Greece)	NZL (New Zealand)	ESP (Spain)	JPN (Japan)	Points
1	(Finland) Reeta Hämäläinen		14^{1}	3^{1}				3^{3}	1^{2}		1		4^{1}	3	116
2	(Norway) Torstein Eriksen	1^{3}	1		Ret	Ret		1^{1}		2^{1}	7^{1}				109
3	(Poland) Maciek Szczepaniak			2	2^{2}		1^{1}	5				2^{2}	6	Ret	104
4	Konstantin Aleksandrov	3	Ret	4	NC	1		WD	DNS	NC	2		3		85
5	(France) Valentin Sarreaud			1	1	11^{2}				3^{2}	Ret				69
6	(Finland) Mikko Markkula				Ret	25		2^{2}	DSQ		10^{2}		1	2^{2}	68
7	(United Kingdom) Craig Drew			5	3	4^{3}		7		4	Ret				56
8	(Finland) Mikko Lukka		3	18		3^{1}		4		Ret			5		55
9	(Belgium) Louis Louka	5^{2}		25^{3}						5	Ret		11	1	48
10	(New Zealand) John Kennard							Ret	3			1^{1}			43
11	(United States) Alex Kihurani	4		11	Ret		2^{2}	10						6	41
12	(France) Andy Malfoy	Ret		6^{2}	WD					1^{3}					36
13	(Estonia) Silver Simm		4					12	2						30
14	(Finland) Enni Mälkönen					5			10^{1}				7	5	30
15	(Poland) Szymon Gospodarczyk			9	4	8		15	6				9		28
16	(Finland) Antti Linnaketo		6^{3}		17	6			5^{3}						28
17	(Spain) Rodrigo Sanjuan				21^{3}	2							8		23
18	(Czech Republic) Petr Těšínský	2		8	20	Ret									22
19	(United Kingdom) Ross Whittock	7									3^{3}				22
20	(Argentina) Marcelo Der Ohannesian	Ret	15		Ret	19		9	7		5			14^{3}	19
21	(Norway) Stig Rune Skjærmoen		2												18
22	(France) Arnaud Dunand												2		18
23	(United Kingdom) Gurdeep Panesar						3^{3}								16
24	(Australia) Glen Waston											3^{3}			16
25	(Czech Republic) Michal Ernst				7	9			8		8				16
26	(Spain) Axel Coronado				24	7		6							14
27	(Italy) Luca Beltrame	8	10	14		Ret		13					16	7^{1}	14
28	(Kenya) Azhar Bhatti						4								12
29	(Finland) Ville Mannisenmäki								4						12
30	(Norway) Roger Eilertsen										4				12
31	(Australia) John McCarthy											4			12
32	(Japan) Sae Kitagawa													4	12
33	(United Kingdom) James Morgan		5^{2}	21	Ret	Ret					12		12		12
34	(France) Benjamin Boulloud	6^{1}													11
35	(Portugal) Luís Ramalho				5										10
36	(Germany) Ella Kremer					DNS						5	15		10
37	(Brazil) Gabriel Morales				WD		Ret		31		6			11	8
38	(Portugal) José Teixeira				6										8
39	(Belgium) Filip Cuvelier									6					8
40	(New Zealand) Paul Burborough											6			8
41	(Sweden) Nicklas Jonasson		7												6
42	(France) Thibault de la Haye			7	Ret	WD									6
43	(Australia) Andrew Sarandis					21		14				7			6
44	(France) François Gilbert									7					6
45	(Belgium) Pieter Tsjoen	10				10			9	9					6
46	(Republic of Ireland) James Fulton		13		19	20		8	13	Ret			10		5
47	(France) Laurent Magat	12			8	14					16		18	15	4
48	(Poland) Maciek Baran		8												4
49	(Germany) Timo Gottschalk			12	Ret					8	11				4
50	(New Zealand) Tony Rawstorn											8			4
51	(Japan) Misako Saida			26						18				8	4
52	(United Kingdom) Elliott Edmondson				25^{1}										3
53	(France) Anderson Levratti	9		15						14					2
54	(Belgium) Stéphane Prévot		Ret		9	Ret									2
55	(Spain) Marc Martí		9		22	Ret		Ret			22				2
56	(Greece) Nikolaos Zakheos										9				2
57	(New Zealand) Matt Hayward											9			2
58	(Republic of Ireland) Michael Joseph Morrissey	13	16							15			23	9	2
59	(Spain) Borja Rozada												14^{2}		2
60	(Portugal) Hugo Magalhães		Ret		10	12					19		28		1
61	(Finland) Samu Vaaleri			10					12				13		1
62	(Spain) Jordi Hereu				12	24				17	20	10	26		1
63	(Belgium) Kris D'alleine									10					1
64	(United Kingdom) Stuart Loudon													10	1
65	(Spain) Alejandro López Fernández												23^{3}		1
Pos.	Co-Driver	MON (Monaco)	SWE (Sweden)	CRO (Croatia)	POR (Portugal)	ITA (Italy)	KEN (Kenya)	EST (Estonia)	FIN (Finland)	BEL (Belgium)	GRC (Greece)	NZL (New Zealand)	ESP (Spain)	JPN (Japan)	Points

Key
Colour	Result
Gold	Winner
Silver	2nd place
Bronze	3rd place
Green	Points finish
Blue	Non-points finish
Blue	Non-classified finish (NC)
Purple	Did not finish (Ret)
Black	Excluded (EX)
Black	Disqualified (DSQ)
White	Did not start (DNS)
White	Cancelled (C)
Blank	Withdrew entry from the event (WD)

Notes:
^{1 2 3} – Power Stage position

=== FIA WRC2 Championship-2 for Teams ===
Pos.	Team	MON (Monaco)	SWE (Sweden)	CRO (Croatia)	POR (Portugal)	ITA (Italy)	KEN (Kenya)	EST (Estonia)	FIN (Finland)	BEL (Belgium)	GRC (Greece)	NZL (New Zealand)	ESP (Spain)	JPN (Japan)	Total Points	Classified Points
1	(Germany) Toksport WRT	1	1		Ret	1		1		1				2	188	188
1	(Germany) Toksport WRT	Ret	4		Ret	Ret		Ret		2				3	188	188
2	(South Korea) Hyundai Motorsport N				1	2		2	1		3		1	1	211	186
2	(South Korea) Hyundai Motorsport N				Ret	3		3	DSQ		4		5	6	211	186
3	(Germany) Toksport WRT 2		3	1				NC	NC		1		2	4	156	156
3	(Germany) Toksport WRT 2		Ret	2				WD	DNS		2		3	5	156	156
4	(Czech Republic) Yacco ACCR Team	2		4											50	50
4	(Czech Republic) Yacco ACCR Team	4		6											50	50
5	(France) Saintéloc Junior Team	3		3	Ret										40	40
5	(France) Saintéloc Junior Team	Ret		5	Ret										40	40
6	(United Kingdom) M-Sport Ford WRT		2										4		38	38
6	(United Kingdom) M-Sport Ford WRT		Ret										6		38	38
Pos.	Team	MON (Monaco)	SWE (Sweden)	CRO (Croatia)	POR (Portugal)	ITA (Italy)	KEN (Kenya)	EST (Estonia)	FIN (Finland)	BEL (Belgium)	GRC (Greece)	NZL (New Zealand)	ESP (Spain)	JPN (Japan)	Total Points	Classified Points

Key
Colour	Result
Gold	Winner
Silver	2nd place
Bronze	3rd place
Green	Points finish
Blue	Non-points finish
Blue	Non-classified finish (NC)
Purple	Did not finish (Ret)
Black	Excluded (EX)
Black	Disqualified (DSQ)
White	Did not start (DNS)
White	Cancelled (C)
Blank	Withdrew entry from the event (WD)

Notes:
^{1 2 3} – Power Stage position

=== FIA WRC2 Junior Championship for Drivers ===
Pos.	Driver	MON (Monaco)	SWE (Sweden)	CRO (Croatia)	POR (Portugal)	ITA (Italy)	KEN (Kenya)	EST (Estonia)	FIN (Finland)	BEL (Belgium)	GRC (Greece)	NZL (New Zealand)	ESP (Spain)	JPN (Japan)	Points
1	(Finland) Emil Lindholm		6	1				1	1		1		2	2	136
2	Nikolay Gryazin	2	Ret	2	NC	1		WD	DNS		2		1		104
3	(United Kingdom) Chris Ingram	4		3	1	3				1	Ret				92
4	(Paraguay) Fabrizio Zaldivar				3	9		4	4		3		4	5	76
5	(Poland) Mikołaj Marczyk			5	2	6		6	3				6		67
6	(Luxembourg) Grégoire Munster	3		9						2	Ret		8	1	64
7	(Estonia) Georg Linnamäe		1	8	Ret	Ret		2			4		9		61
8	(Finland) Eerik Pietarinen		2		4	5			2						58
9	(Finland) Sami Pajari					4			5				3	3	52
10	(Republic of Ireland) Josh McErlean		5		5	8		3	7	Ret			7		51
11	(Czech Republic) Erik Cais	1		4	6	Ret									45
12	(Bolivia) Bruno Bulacia		3		8	Ret		Ret			5		12	4	41
13	(Spain) Jan Solans				7	2							5		34
14	(Kenya) Amaanraj Rai						1								25
15	(Australia) Harry Bates											1			25
16	(Bolivia) Marco Bulacia	Ret	7		Ret	7		Ret		4	WD				24
17	(Finland) Mikko Heikkilä			6					6				10		17
18	(Belgium) Sébastien Bedoret									3					15
19	(Italy) Enrico Oldrati		4												12
20	(Estonia) Gregor Jeets							5							10
21	(Slovenia) Aljoša Novak			7											6
Pos.	Driver	MON (Monaco)	SWE (Sweden)	CRO (Croatia)	POR (Portugal)	ITA (Italy)	KEN (Kenya)	EST (Estonia)	FIN (Finland)	BEL (Belgium)	GRC (Greece)	NZL (New Zealand)	ESP (Spain)	JPN (Japan)	Points

Key
Colour	Result
Gold	Winner
Silver	2nd place
Bronze	3rd place
Green	Points finish
Blue	Non-points finish
Blue	Non-classified finish (NC)
Purple	Did not finish (Ret)
Black	Excluded (EX)
Black	Disqualified (DSQ)
White	Did not start (DNS)
White	Cancelled (C)
Blank	Withdrew entry from the event (WD)

=== FIA WRC2 Junior Championship for Co-Drivers ===
Pos.	Driver	MON (Monaco)	SWE (Sweden)	CRO (Croatia)	POR (Portugal)	ITA (Italy)	KEN (Kenya)	EST (Estonia)	FIN (Finland)	BEL (Belgium)	GRC (Greece)	NZL (New Zealand)	ESP (Spain)	JPN (Japan)	Points
1	(Republic of Ireland) James Fulton		2		1	1		1	2	Ret			1		136
2	(Belgium) Louis Louka	1		2						1	Ret		2	1	109
3	(Finland) Samu Vaaleri			1					1				3		65
4	(Italy) Elia De Guio		1												25
5	(Spain) Alejandro López Fernández												4		12
Pos.	Driver	MON (Monaco)	SWE (Sweden)	CRO (Croatia)	POR (Portugal)	ITA (Italy)	KEN (Kenya)	EST (Estonia)	FIN (Finland)	BEL (Belgium)	GRC (Greece)	NZL (New Zealand)	ESP (Spain)	JPN (Japan)	Points

Key
Colour	Result
Gold	Winner
Silver	2nd place
Bronze	3rd place
Green	Points finish
Blue	Non-points finish
Blue	Non-classified finish (NC)
Purple	Did not finish (Ret)
Black	Excluded (EX)
Black	Disqualified (DSQ)
White	Did not start (DNS)
White	Cancelled (C)
Blank	Withdrew entry from the event (WD)

=== FIA WRC2 Masters Cup for Drivers ===
Pos.	Driver	MON (Monaco)	SWE (Sweden)	CRO (Croatia)	POR (Portugal)	ITA (Italy)	KEN (Kenya)	EST (Estonia)	FIN (Finland)	BEL (Belgium)	GRC (Greece)	NZL (New Zealand)	ESP (Spain)	JPN (Japan)	Points
1	(Italy) Mauro Miele	1	2	2		Ret		1					2	1	129
2	(Germany) Armin Kremer			1	Ret	DNS				1	1	1	1		125
3	(France) Jean-Michel Raoux	4			1	3					2		3	5	95
4	(Belgium) Freddy Loix	3				1			1	2					83
5	(Republic of Ireland) Eamonn Boland	5	4							4			5	3	59
6	(Spain) Miguel Diaz Aboitiz				4	7				6	5	4	7		56
7	(Italy) Fabrizio Arengi	6		5	5						3		6		51
8	(Switzerland) Olivier Burri	2		3						3					48
9	(France) Frédéric Rosati	7	Ret		2	Ret					Ret			4	36
10	(Japan) Osamu Fukunaga			7						7				2	30
11	(Poland) Michał Sołowow		1												25
12	(Spain) Eduard Pons Suñe					4							4		24
13	(Netherlands) Henk Vossen			6						5			8		22
14	(Italy) Carlo Covi	8		8		8					5				22
15	(Greece) Jourdan Serderidis					2									18
15	(New Zealand) Todd Bawden											2			18
16	(France) Laurent Battut				3	Ret									15
17	(Sweden) Joakim Roman		3												15
18	(New Zealand) Andy Martin											3			15
20	(Croatia) Niko Pulić			4											12
21	(Portugal) Diogo Salvi										4				12
22	(Italy) Silvano Patera					5									10
23	(Portugal) Francisco Teixeira				6										8
24	(Italy) Francesco Tali					6									8
25	(Spain) Alexander Villanueva		Ret		7										6
26	(Greece) Georgios Vasilakis										7				6
Pos.	Driver	MON (Monaco)	SWE (Sweden)	CRO (Croatia)	POR (Portugal)	ITA (Italy)	KEN (Kenya)	EST (Estonia)	FIN (Finland)	BEL (Belgium)	GRC (Greece)	NZL (New Zealand)	ESP (Spain)	JPN (Japan)	Points

Key
Colour	Result
Gold	Winner
Silver	2nd place
Bronze	3rd place
Green	Points finish
Blue	Non-points finish
Blue	Non-classified finish (NC)
Purple	Did not finish (Ret)
Black	Excluded (EX)
Black	Disqualified (DSQ)
White	Did not start (DNS)
White	Cancelled (C)
Blank	Withdrew entry from the event (WD)

=== FIA WRC2 Masters Cup for Co-Drivers ===
Pos.	Driver	MON (Monaco)	SWE (Sweden)	CRO (Croatia)	POR (Portugal)	ITA (Italy)	KEN (Kenya)	EST (Estonia)	FIN (Finland)	BEL (Belgium)	GRC (Greece)	NZL (New Zealand)	ESP (Spain)	JPN (Japan)	Points
1	(France) Laurent Magat	1			1	1					1		1	2	143
2	(Republic of Ireland) Michael Joseph Morrissey	2	2							1				1	86
3	(Italy) Michela Lorigiola	4		2							2				48
4	(Netherlands) Hans van Goor			1						2					43
5	(Sweden) Jörgen Fornander		1												25
6	(New Zealand) Paul Burborough											1			25
7	(Belgium) Stéphane Prévot		Ret		2	Ret									18
8	(Italy) Danilo Fappani					2									18
9	(France) Philippe Marchetto	3													15
10	(Belgium) Eric Gressens				3	Ret									15
11	(Netherlands) Radboud van Hoek												3		15
Pos.	Driver	MON (Monaco)	SWE (Sweden)	CRO (Croatia)	POR (Portugal)	ITA (Italy)	KEN (Kenya)	EST (Estonia)	FIN (Finland)	BEL (Belgium)	GRC (Greece)	NZL (New Zealand)	ESP (Spain)	JPN (Japan)	Points

Key
Colour	Result
Gold	Winner
Silver	2nd place
Bronze	3rd place
Green	Points finish
Blue	Non-points finish
Blue	Non-classified finish (NC)
Purple	Did not finish (Ret)
Black	Excluded (EX)
Black	Disqualified (DSQ)
White	Did not start (DNS)
White	Cancelled (C)
Blank	Withdrew entry from the event (WD)
