= 2022 Rally Japan =

7th edition of Rally Japan

2022 Rally Japan FORUM8 Rally Japan 2022
Round 13 of 13 in the 2022 World Rally Championship
← Previous event
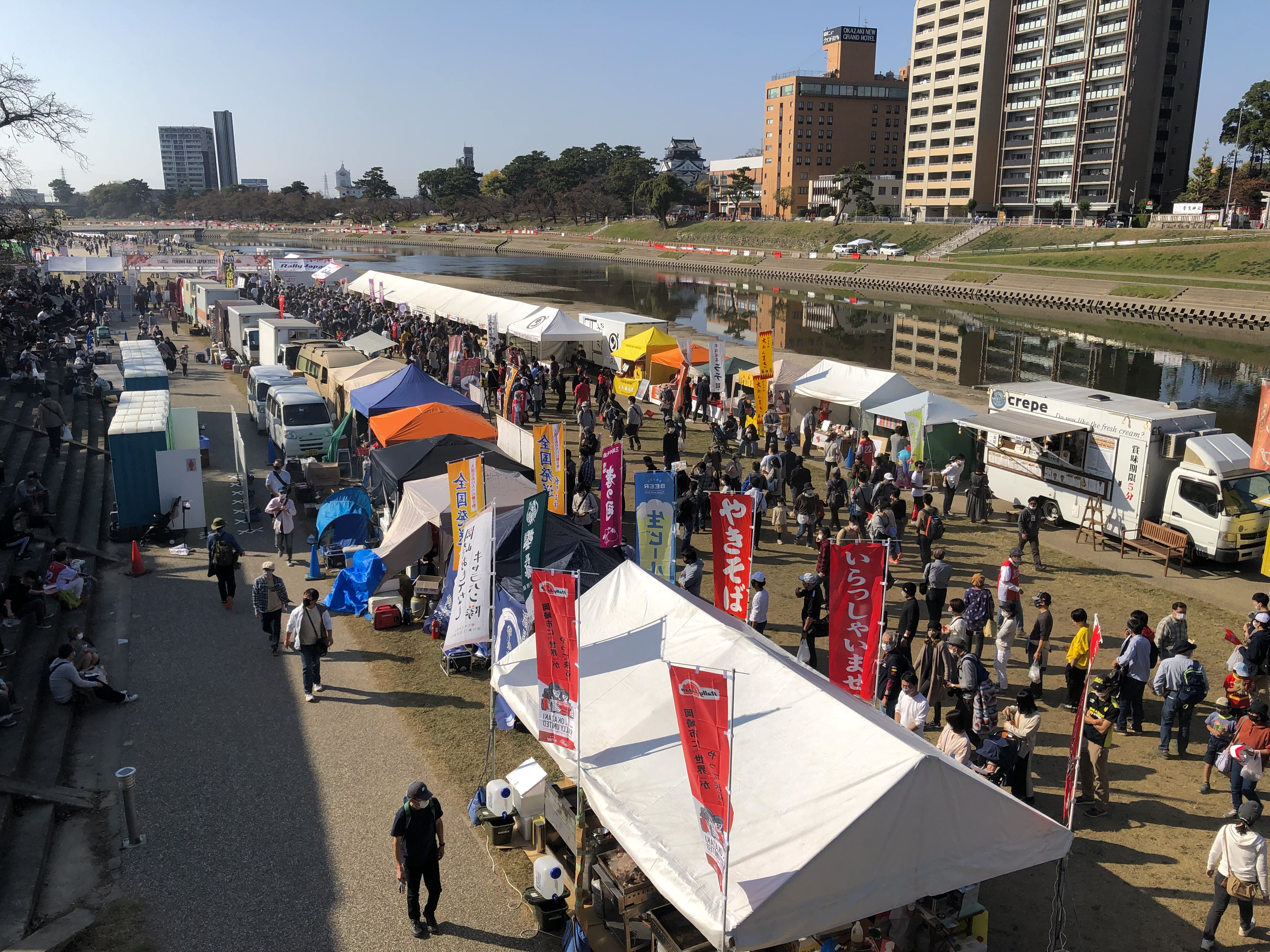
- Rally Japan returned to the calendar after 2010.
- Host country: Japan
- Rally base: Toyota, Aichi, Chūbu region
- Dates run: 10 – 13 November 2022
- Start location: Toyota, Aichi, Chūbu region
- Finish location: Ena, Gifu, Chūbu region
- Stages: 19 (283.27 km; 176.02 miles)
- Stage surface: Tarmac
- Transport distance: 681.98 km (423.76 miles)
- Overall distance: 965.25 km (599.78 miles)

Statistics
- Crews registered: 38
- Crews: 36 at start, 32 at finish

Overall results
- Overall winner: (Belgium) Thierry Neuville (Belgium) Martijn Wydaeghe (South Korea) Hyundai Shell Mobis WRT; 2:43:52.3
- Power Stage winner: (Republic of Ireland) Craig Breen (Republic of Ireland) James Fulton (United Kingdom) M-Sport Ford WRT; 5:20.5

Support category results
- WRC-2 winner: (Luxembourg) Grégoire Munster (Belgium) Louis Louka; 2:51:43.1
- WRC-3 winner: No classified finishers.

The 2022 Rally Japan (also known as the FORUM8 Rally Japan 2022) was a motor racing event for rally cars held over four days between 10 and 13 November 2022. It marked the seventh running of the Rally Japan. The event was the final round of the 2022 World Rally Championship, World Rally Championship-2 and World Rally Championship-3. The 2022 event was based in Nagoya in Chūbu Region and was contested over nineteen special stages covering a total competitive distance of 283.27 km (176.02 mi).

Sébastien Ogier and Julien Ingrassia are the defending rally winners. However, Ingrassia would not defend his title as he retired from the sport at the end of 2021 season. Citroën Total World Rally Team, the team they drove for in 2010, when the Rally Japan held a World Rally Championship event last time, are the defending manufacturers' winners, but they would not be defending their titles after parent company Citroën withdrew from the sport.

Thierry Neuville and Martijn Wydaeghe won their second rally of the season. Their team, Hyundai Shell Mobis WRT, were the manufacturer's winners. Grégoire Munster and Louis Louka won the World Rally Championship-2 category, while Emil Lindholm and Reeta Hämäläinen clinched the WRC-2 titles.

== Background ==
=== Entry list ===
The following crews were entered into the rally. The event was open to crews competing in the World Rally Championship, its support categories, the World Rally Championship-2 and World Rally Championship-3, and privateer entries that are not registered to score points in any championship. Eleven were entered under Rally1 regulations, as are seventeen Rally2 crews in the World Rally Championship-2.

Rally1 entries competing in the World Rally Championship
| No. | Driver | Co-Driver | Entrant | Car | Championship eligibility | Tyre |
|---|---|---|---|---|---|---|
| 1 | (France) Sébastien Ogier | (France) Vincent Landais | (Japan) Toyota Gazoo Racing WRT | Toyota GR Yaris Rally1 | Driver, Co-driver, Manufacturer | P |
| 6 | (Spain) Dani Sordo | (Spain) Cándido Carrera | (South Korea) Hyundai Shell Mobis WRT | Hyundai i20 N Rally1 | Driver, Co-driver, Manufacturer | P |
| 8 | (Estonia) Ott Tänak | (Estonia) Martin Järveoja | (South Korea) Hyundai Shell Mobis WRT | Hyundai i20 N Rally1 | Driver, Co-driver, Manufacturer | P |
| 9 | (Greece) Jourdan Serderidis | (Belgium) Frédéric Miclotte | (United Kingdom) M-Sport Ford WRT | Ford Puma Rally1 | Driver, Co-driver | —N/a |
| 11 | (Belgium) Thierry Neuville | (Belgium) Martijn Wydaeghe | (South Korea) Hyundai Shell Mobis WRT | Hyundai i20 N Rally1 | Driver, Co-driver, Manufacturer | P |
| 16 | (France) Adrien Fourmaux | (France) Alexandre Coria | (United Kingdom) M-Sport Ford WRT | Ford Puma Rally1 | Driver, Co-driver, Manufacturer | —N/a |
| 18 | (Japan) Takamoto Katsuta | (Republic of Ireland) Aaron Johnston | (Japan) Toyota Gazoo Racing WRT NG | Toyota GR Yaris Rally1 | Driver, Co-driver, Manufacturer/Team | P |
| 33 | (United Kingdom) Elfyn Evans | (United Kingdom) Scott Martin | (Japan) Toyota Gazoo Racing WRT | Toyota GR Yaris Rally1 | Driver, Co-driver, Manufacturer | P |
| 42 | (Republic of Ireland) Craig Breen | (Republic of Ireland) James Fulton | (United Kingdom) M-Sport Ford WRT | Ford Puma Rally1 | Driver, Co-driver, Manufacturer | P |
| 44 | (United Kingdom) Gus Greensmith | (Sweden) Jonas Andersson | (United Kingdom) M-Sport Ford WRT | Ford Puma Rally1 | Driver, Co-driver, Manufacturer | P |
| 69 | (Finland) Kalle Rovanperä | (Finland) Jonne Halttunen | (Japan) Toyota Gazoo Racing WRT | Toyota GR Yaris Rally1 | Driver, Co-driver, Manufacturer | P |

Rally2 entries competing in the World Rally Championship-2
| No. | Driver | Co-Driver | Entrant | Car | Championship eligibility | Tyre |
|---|---|---|---|---|---|---|
| 20 | (Poland) Kajetan Kajetanowicz | (Poland) Maciej Szczepaniak | (Poland) Kajetan Kajetanowicz | Škoda Fabia Rally2 evo | Driver, Co-driver | P |
| 21 | (Finland) Emil Lindholm | (Finland) Reeta Hämäläinen | (Germany) Toksport WRT | Škoda Fabia Rally2 evo | Junior Driver, Co-driver, Team | P |
| 22 | (Finland) Teemu Suninen | (Finland) Mikko Markkula | (South Korea) Hyundai Motorsport N | Hyundai i20 N Rally2 | Driver, Co-driver, Team | P |
| 23 | (Finland) Sami Pajari | (Finland) Enni Mälkönen | (Germany) Toksport WRT | Škoda Fabia Rally2 evo | Junior Driver, Co-driver, Team | P |
| 24 | (Luxembourg) Grégoire Munster | (Belgium) Louis Louka | (Luxembourg) Grégoire Munster | Hyundai i20 N Rally2 | Junior Driver, Junior Co-driver | P |
| 25 | (Bolivia) Bruno Bulacia | (Brazil) Gabriel Morales | (Germany) Toksport WRT 2 | Škoda Fabia Rally2 evo | Junior Driver, Co-driver, Team | P |
| 26 | (United States) Sean Johnston | (United States) Alexander Kihurani | (France) Saintéloc Junior Team | Citroën C3 Rally2 | Driver, Co-driver | P |
| 27 | (Paraguay) Fabrizio Zaldivar | (Italy) Marcelo Der Ohannesian | (South Korea) Hyundai Motorsport N | Hyundai i20 N Rally2 | Junior Driver, Co-driver, Team | P |
| 28 | (Italy) Mauro Miele | (Italy) Luca Beltrame | (Germany) Toksport WRT 2 | Škoda Fabia Rally2 evo | Masters Driver, Co-driver, Team | P |
| 29 | (Finland) Heikki Kovalainen | (Japan) Sae Kitagawa | (Finland) Heikki Kovalainen | Škoda Fabia R5 | Driver, Co-driver | P |
| 30 | (Japan) Osamu Fukunaga | (Japan) Misako Saida | (Japan) Osamu Fukunaga | Škoda Fabia R5 | Masters Driver, Co-driver | P |
| 31 | (Japan) Toshi Arai | (Japan) Naoya Tanaka | (Japan) Toshi Arai | Citroën C3 Rally2 | Masters Driver, Co-driver | P |
| 32 | (Australia) Luke Anear | (United Kingdom) Stuart Loudon | (Australia) Luke Anear | Ford Fiesta Rally2 | Driver, Co-driver | P |
| 34 | (France) Jean-Michel Raoux | (France) Laurent Magat | (France) Jean-Michel Raoux | Volkswagen Polo GTI R5 | Masters Driver, Masters Co-driver | P |
| 35 | (Republic of Ireland) Eamonn Boland | (Republic of Ireland) Michael Joseph Morrissey | (Republic of Ireland) Eamonn Boland | Ford Fiesta Rally2 | Masters Driver, Masters Co-driver | P |
| 36 | (France) Frédéric Rosati | (France) Patrick Chiappe | (France) Frédéric Rosati | Hyundai i20 N Rally2 | Masters Driver, Co-driver | P |
| 37 | (Japan) Satoshi Imai | (Japan) Shizuka Takehara | (Japan) Satoshi Imai | Citroën C3 Rally2 | Driver, Co-driver | P |

Other major entries
| No. | Driver | Co-Driver | Entrant | Car | Tyre |
|---|---|---|---|---|---|
| 40 | (Japan) Hiroki Arai | (Austria) Ilka Minor | Ahead Japan Racing Team | Peugeot 208 Rally4 | P |

=== Itinerary ===
All dates and times are JST (UTC+9).

| Date | Time | No. | Stage name | Distance |
|---|---|---|---|---|
| 10 November | 9:01 | — | Kuragaike Park Reverse [Shakedown] | 2.80 km |
| 10 November | 17:38 | SS1 | Kuragaike Park | 2.75 km |
| 11 November | 7:02 | SS2 | Isegami's Tunnel 1 | 23.29 km |
| 11 November | 8:00 | SS3 | Inabu Dam 1 | 19.38 km |
| 11 November | 8:58 | SS4 | Shitara Town R 1 | 22.44 km |
| 11 November | 13:31 | SS5 | Isegami's Tunnel 2 | 23.29 km |
| 11 November | 14:29 | SS6 | Inabu Dam 2 | 19.38 km |
| 11 November | 15:27 | SS7 | Shitara Town R 2 | 22.44 km |
| 12 November | 7:07 | SS8 | Nukata Forest 1 | 20.56 km |
| 12 November | 8:08 | SS9 | Lake Mikawako 1 | 14.74 km |
| 12 November | 9:03 | SS10 | Shinshiro City | 7.08 km |
| 12 November | 12:37 | SS11 | Nukata Forest 2 | 20.56 km |
| 12 November | 13:38 | SS12 | Lake Mikawako 2 | 14.74 km |
| 12 November | 15:36 | SS13 | Okazaki City SSS 1 | 1.40 km |
| 12 November | 15:49 | SS14 | Okazaki City SSS 2 | 1.40 km |
| 13 November | 8:08 | SS15 | Asahi Kougen 1 | 7.52 km |
| 13 November | 9:12 | SS16 | Ena City 1 | 21.59 km |
| 13 November | 10:10 | SS17 | Nenoue Plateau | 11.60 km |
| 13 November | 11:48 | SS18 | Ena City 2 | 21.59 km |
| 13 November | 14:18 | SS19 | Asahi Kougen 2 [Power Stage] | 7.52 km |

== Report ==
=== WRC Rally1 ===
==== Classification ====
| Position | | No. | Driver | Co-driver | Entrant | Car | Time | Difference | Points | |
| Event | Class | No. | Driver | Co-driver | Entrant | Car | Time | Difference | Event | Stage |
|---|---|---|---|---|---|---|---|---|---|---|
| 1 | 1 | 11 | Thierry Neuville | Martijn Wydaeghe | Hyundai Shell Mobis WRT | Hyundai i20 N Rally1 | 2:43:52.3 | 0.0 | 25 | 2 |
| 2 | 2 | 8 | Ott Tänak | Martin Järveoja | Hyundai Shell Mobis WRT | Hyundai i20 N Rally1 | 2:45:03.4 | +1:11.1 | 18 | 0 |
| 3 | 3 | 18 | Takamoto Katsuta | Aaron Johnston | Toyota Gazoo Racing WRT NG | Toyota GR Yaris Rally1 | 2:46:03.6 | +2:11.3 | 15 | 0 |
| 4 | 4 | 1 | Sébastien Ogier | Vincent Landais | Toyota Gazoo Racing WRT | Toyota GR Yaris Rally1 | 2:46:15.9 | +2:23.6 | 12 | 0 |
| 5 | 5 | 33 | Elfyn Evans | Scott Martin | Toyota Gazoo Racing WRT | Toyota GR Yaris Rally1 | 2:47:57.4 | +4:05.1 | 10 | 0 |
| 6 | 6 | 44 | Gus Greensmith | Jonas Andersson | M-Sport Ford WRT | Ford Puma Rally1 | 2:47:59.7 | +4:07.4 | 8 | 0 |
| 12 | 7 | 69 | Kalle Rovanperä | Jonne Halttunen | Toyota Gazoo Racing WRT | Toyota GR Yaris Rally1 | 2:54:33.1 | +10:40.8 | 0 | 0 |
| 24 | 8 | 42 | Craig Breen | James Fulton | M-Sport Ford WRT | Ford Puma Rally1 | 3:17:14.5 | +33:22.2 | 0 | 5 |
| Retired SS2 | | 6 | Dani Sordo | Cándido Carrera | Hyundai Shell Mobis WRT | Hyundai i20 N Rally1 | Fire | | 0 | 0 |
| Did not start | | 9 | Jourdan Serderidis | Frédéric Miclotte | M-Sport Ford WRT | Ford Puma Rally1 | Withdrawn | | 0 | 0 |
| Did not start | | 16 | Adrien Fourmaux | Alexandre Coria | M-Sport Ford WRT | Ford Puma Rally1 | Withdrawn | | 0 | 0 |

==== Special stages ====
| Stage | Winners | Car | Time | Class leaders |
|---|---|---|---|---|
| SD | Neuville / Wydaeghe | Hyundai i20 N Rally1 | 2:04.6 | —N/a |
| SS1 | Ogier / Landais | Toyota GR Yaris Rally1 | 2:07.0 | Ogier / Landais |
| SS2 | Rovanperä / Halttunen | Toyota GR Yaris Rally1 | 17:44.6 | Rovanperä / Halttunen |
| SS3 | Stage cancelled | | | |
| SS4 | Evans / Martin | Toyota GR Yaris Rally1 | 14:23.3 | Evans / Martin; Neuville / Wydaeghe |
| SS5 | Evans / Martin | Toyota GR Yaris Rally1 | 10:38.0 | Evans / Martin |
| SS6 | Rovanperä / Halttunen | Toyota GR Yaris Rally1 | 12:18.9 | Evans / Martin |
| SS7 | Stage cancelled | | | |
| SS8 | Evans / Martin | Toyota GR Yaris Rally1 | 14:17.1 | Evans / Martin |
| SS9 | Ogier / Landais | Toyota GR Yaris Rally1 | 10:26.5 | Evans / Martin |
| SS10 | Tänak / Järveoja | Hyundai i20 N Rally1 | 3:31.5 | Evans / Martin |
| SS11 | Ogier / Landais | Toyota GR Yaris Rally1 | 14:06.9 | Evans / Martin |
| SS12 | Ogier / Landais | Toyota GR Yaris Rally1 | 10:18.2 | Neuville / Wydaeghe |
| SS13 | Stage cancelled | | | |
| SS14 | Neuville / Wydaeghe | Hyundai i20 N Rally1 | 1:18.8 | Neuville / Wydaeghe |
| SS15 | Evans / Martin | Toyota GR Yaris Rally1 | 4:49.5 | Neuville / Wydaeghe |
| SS16 | Neuville / Wydaeghe | Hyundai i20 N Rally1 | 15:38.7 | Neuville / Wydaeghe |
| SS17 | Ogier / Landais | Toyota GR Yaris Rally1 | 7:45.1 | Neuville / Wydaeghe |
| SS18 | Breen / Fulton | Ford Puma Rally1 | 17:42.1 | Neuville / Wydaeghe |
| SS19 | Breen / Fulton | Ford Puma Rally1 | 5:20.5 | Neuville / Wydaeghe |

==== Championship standings ====
- **Bold text** indicates 2022 World Champions.

| Pos. | Drivers' championships | | | Co-drivers' championships | | | Manufacturers' championships | | |
| Pos. | Move | Driver | Points | Move | Co-driver | Points | Move | Manufacturer | Points |
|---|---|---|---|---|---|---|---|---|---|
| 1 | | **Kalle Rovanperä** | 255 | | **Jonne Halttunen** | 255 | | **Toyota Gazoo Racing WRT** | 525 |
| 2 | | Ott Tänak | 205 | | Martin Järveoja | 205 | | Hyundai Shell Mobis WRT | 455 |
| 3 | | Thierry Neuville | 193 | | Martijn Wydaeghe | 193 | | M-Sport Ford WRT | 257 |
| 4 | | Elfyn Evans | 134 | | Scott Martin | 134 | | Toyota Gazoo Racing WRT NG | 138 |
| 5 | | Takamoto Katsuta | 122 | | Aaron Johnston | 122 | | | |

=== WRC-2 Rally2 ===
==== Classification ====
| Position | | No. | Driver | Co-driver | Entrant | Car | Time | Difference | Points | | |
| Event | Class | No. | Driver | Co-driver | Entrant | Car | Time | Difference | Class | Stage | Event |
|---|---|---|---|---|---|---|---|---|---|---|---|
| 7 | 1 | 24 | Grégoire Munster | Louis Louka | Grégoire Munster | Hyundai i20 N Rally2 | 2:51:43.1 | 0.0 | 25 | 0 | 6 |
| 8 | 2 | 22 | Teemu Suninen | Mikko Markkula | Hyundai Motorsport N | Hyundai i20 N Rally2 | 2:52:04.7 | +21.6 | 18 | 2 | 4+3 |
| 9 | 3 | 21 | Emil Lindholm | Reeta Hämäläinen | Toksport WRT | Škoda Fabia Rally2 evo | 2:52:17.9 | +34.8 | 15 | 0 | 2 |
| 10 | 4 | 29 | Heikki Kovalainen | Sae Kitagawa | Heikki Kovalainen | Škoda Fabia R5 | 2:52:52.1 | +1:09.0 | 12 | 0 | 1 |
| 11 | 5 | 23 | Sami Pajari | Enni Mälkönen | Toksport WRT | Škoda Fabia Rally2 evo | 2:52:53.1 | +1:10.0 | 10 | 0 | 0 |
| 13 | 6 | 26 | Sean Johnston | Alexander Kihurani | Saintéloc Junior Team | Citroën C3 Rally2 | 2:54:45.8 | +3:02.7 | 8 | 0 | 0 |
| 14 | 7 | 28 | Mauro Miele | Luca Beltrame | Toksport WRT 2 | Škoda Fabia Rally2 evo | 2:56:25.8 | +4:42.7 | 6 | 3 | 0+4 |
| 16 | 8 | 30 | Osamu Fukunaga | Misako Saida | Osamu Fukunaga | Škoda Fabia R5 | 3:01:55.5 | +10:42.4 | 4 | 0 | 0 |
| 17 | 9 | 35 | Eamonn Boland | Michael Joseph Morrissey | Eamonn Boland | Ford Fiesta Rally2 | 3:02:34.3 | +10:51.2 | 2 | 0 | 0 |
| 18 | 10 | 32 | Luke Anear | Stuart Loudon | Luke Anear | Ford Fiesta Rally2 | 3:05:19.4 | +13:36.3 | 1 | 0 | 0 |
| 19 | 11 | 25 | Bruno Bulacia | Gabriel Morales | Toksport WRT 2 | Škoda Fabia Rally2 evo | 3:05:58.2 | +14:15.1 | 0 | 0 | 0 |
| 22 | 12 | 37 | Satoshi Imai | Shizuka Takehara | Satoshi Imai | Citroën C3 Rally2 | 3:15:22.6 | +23:39.5 | 0 | 0 | 0 |
| 25 | 13 | 36 | Frédéric Rosati | Patrick Chiappe | Frédéric Rosati | Hyundai i20 N Rally2 | 3:19:43.1 | +28:00.0 | 0 | 0 | 0 |
| 29 | 14 | 27 | Fabrizio Zaldivar | Marcelo Der Ohannesian | Hyundai Motorsport N | Hyundai i20 N Rally2 | 3:44:44.5 | +53:01.4 | 0 | 1 | 0+1 |
| 32 | 15 | 34 | Jean-Michel Raoux | Laurent Magat | Jean-Michel Raoux | Volkswagen Polo GTI R5 | 3:55:34.7 | +1:03:51.6 | 0 | 0 | 0 |
| Retired SS2 | | 20 | Kajetan Kajetanowicz | Maciej Szczepaniak | Kajetan Kajetanowicz | Škoda Fabia Rally2 evo | Crash | | 0 | 0 | 0 |
| Retired SS1 | | 31 | Toshi Arai | Naoya Tanaka | Toshi Arai | Citroën C3 Rally2 | Crash | | 0 | 0 | 0 |

==== Special stages ====
| Stage | Open Championship | | | | Junior Championship | | | | Masters Cup | | | |
| Stage | Winners | Car | Time | Class leaders | Winners | Car | Time | Class leaders | Winners | Car | Time | Class leaders |
|---|---|---|---|---|---|---|---|---|---|---|---|---|
| SD | Lindholm / Hämäläinen | Škoda Fabia Rally2 evo | 2:09.0 | —N/a | Lindholm / Hämäläinen | Škoda Fabia Rally2 evo | 2:09.0 | —N/a | Miele / Beltrame | Škoda Fabia Rally2 evo | 2:14.4 | —N/a |
| SS1 | Lindholm / Hämäläinen; Pajari / Mälkönen | Škoda Fabia Rally2 evo Škoda Fabia Rally2 evo | 2:11.0 | Lindholm / Hämäläinen; Pajari / Mälkönen | Lindholm / Hämäläinen; Pajari / Mälkönen | Škoda Fabia Rally2 evo Škoda Fabia Rally2 evo | 2:11.0 | Lindholm / Hämäläinen; Pajari / Mälkönen | Miele / Beltrame | Škoda Fabia Rally2 evo | 2:20.0 | Miele / Beltrame |
| SS2 | Lindholm / Hämäläinen | Škoda Fabia Rally2 evo | 18:08.6 | Lindholm / Hämäläinen | Lindholm / Hämäläinen | Škoda Fabia Rally2 evo | 18:08.6 | Lindholm / Hämäläinen | Stage interrupted | | | |
| SS3 | Stage cancelled | | | | | | | | | | | |
| SS4 | Pajari / Mälkönen | Škoda Fabia Rally2 evo | 15:08.6 | Lindholm / Hämäläinen | Pajari / Mälkönen | Škoda Fabia Rally2 evo | 15:08.6 | Lindholm / Hämäläinen | Stage interrupted | | | |
| SS5 | Lindholm / Hämäläinen | Škoda Fabia Rally2 evo | 11:08.6 | Lindholm / Hämäläinen | Lindholm / Hämäläinen | Škoda Fabia Rally2 evo | 11:08.6 | Lindholm / Hämäläinen | Miele / Beltrame | Škoda Fabia Rally2 evo | 11:46.6 | Miele / Beltrame |
| SS6 | Suninen / Markkula | Hyundai i20 N Rally2 | 12:50.2 | Pajari / Mälkönen | Pajari / Mälkönen | Škoda Fabia Rally2 evo | 12:51.4 | Pajari / Mälkönen | Miele / Beltrame | Škoda Fabia Rally2 evo | 13:29.3 | Miele / Beltrame |
| SS7 | Stage cancelled | | | | | | | | | | | |
| SS8 | Lindholm / Hämäläinen | Škoda Fabia Rally2 evo | 14:58.2 | Lindholm / Hämäläinen | Lindholm / Hämäläinen | Škoda Fabia Rally2 evo | 14:58.2 | Lindholm / Hämäläinen | Miele / Beltrame | Škoda Fabia Rally2 evo | 15:37.6 | Miele / Beltrame |
| SS9 | Lindholm / Hämäläinen | Škoda Fabia Rally2 evo | 10:53.2 | Lindholm / Hämäläinen | Lindholm / Hämäläinen | Škoda Fabia Rally2 evo | 10:53.2 | Lindholm / Hämäläinen | Miele / Beltrame | Škoda Fabia Rally2 evo | 11:28.4 | Miele / Beltrame |
| SS10 | Lindholm / Hämäläinen | Škoda Fabia Rally2 evo | 3:44.2 | Lindholm / Hämäläinen | Lindholm / Hämäläinen | Škoda Fabia Rally2 evo | 3:44.2 | Lindholm / Hämäläinen | Miele / Beltrame | Škoda Fabia Rally2 evo | 3:56.3 | Miele / Beltrame |
| SS11 | Lindholm / Hämäläinen | Škoda Fabia Rally2 evo | 14:41.4 | Lindholm / Hämäläinen | Lindholm / Hämäläinen | Škoda Fabia Rally2 evo | 14:41.4 | Lindholm / Hämäläinen | Miele / Beltrame | Škoda Fabia Rally2 evo | 15:35.7 | Miele / Beltrame |
| SS12 | Suninen / Markkula | Hyundai i20 N Rally2 | 10:45.5 | Lindholm / Hämäläinen | Munster / Louka | Hyundai i20 N Rally2 | 10:51.9 | Lindholm / Hämäläinen | Miele / Beltrame | Škoda Fabia Rally2 evo | 11:19.7 | Miele / Beltrame |
| SS13 | Stage cancelled | | | | | | | | | | | |
| SS14 | Suninen / Markkula | Hyundai i20 N Rally2 | 1:20.8 | Lindholm / Hämäläinen | Pajari / Mälkönen | Škoda Fabia Rally2 evo | 1:22.1 | Lindholm / Hämäläinen | Miele / Beltrame | Škoda Fabia Rally2 evo | 1:28.2 | Miele / Beltrame |
| SS15 | Pajari / Mälkönen | Škoda Fabia Rally2 evo | 5:07.8 | Lindholm / Hämäläinen | Pajari / Mälkönen | Škoda Fabia Rally2 evo | 5:07.8 | Lindholm / Hämäläinen | Miele / Beltrame | Škoda Fabia Rally2 evo | 5:19.5 | Miele / Beltrame |
| SS16 | Pajari / Mälkönen | Škoda Fabia Rally2 evo | 16:23.6 | Lindholm / Hämäläinen | Pajari / Mälkönen | Škoda Fabia Rally2 evo | 16:23.6 | Lindholm / Hämäläinen | Rosati / Chiappe | Hyundai i20 N Rally2 | 17:20.3 | Miele / Beltrame |
| SS17 | Suninen / Markkula | Hyundai i20 N Rally2 | 8:13.9 | Lindholm / Hämäläinen | Pajari / Mälkönen | Škoda Fabia Rally2 evo | 8:15.3 | Lindholm / Hämäläinen | Miele / Beltrame | Škoda Fabia Rally2 evo | 8:28.1 | Miele / Beltrame |
| SS18 | Munster / Louka | Hyundai i20 N Rally2 | 18:28.4 | Munster / Louka | Munster / Louka | Hyundai i20 N Rally2 | 18:28.4 | Munster / Louka | Miele / Beltrame | Škoda Fabia Rally2 evo | 18:52.7 | Miele / Beltrame |
| SS19 | Miele / Beltrame | Škoda Fabia Rally2 evo | 5:32.3 | Munster / Louka | Munster / Louka | Hyundai i20 N Rally2 | 5:49.6 | Munster / Louka | Miele / Beltrame | Škoda Fabia Rally2 evo | 5:32.3 | Miele / Beltrame |

==== Championship standings ====
- **Bold text** indicates 2022 World Champions.

| Pos. | Open Drivers' championships | | | Open Co-drivers' championships | | | Teams' championships | | | Junior Drivers' championships | | | Junior Co-drivers' championships | | | Driver Masters' championships | | | Co-driver Masters' championships | | |
| Pos. | Move | Driver | Points | Move | Co-driver | Points | Move | Manufacturer | Points | Move | Manufacturer | Points | Move | Driver | Points | Move | Driver | Points | Move | Driver | Points |
|---|---|---|---|---|---|---|---|---|---|---|---|---|---|---|---|---|---|---|---|---|---|
| 1 | 1 | **Emil Lindholm** | 116 | 1 | **Reeta Hämäläinen** | 116 | 1 | **Toksport WRT** | 188 | | **Emil Lindholm** | 144 | | **James Fulton** | 136 | 1 | **Mauro Miele** | 129 | | **Laurent Magat** | 143 |
| 2 | 1 | Andreas Mikkelsen | 109 | 1 | Torstein Eriksen | 109 | 1 | Hyundai Motorsport N | 186 | | Nikolay Gryazin | 104 | | Louis Louka | 111 | 1 | Armin Kremer | 125 | | Michael Joseph Morrissey | 86 |
| 3 | | Kajetan Kajetanowicz | 104 | | Maciej Szczepaniak | 104 | | Toksport WRT 2 | 156 | | Chris Ingram | 92 | | Samu Vaaleri | 65 | | Jean-Michel Raoux | 95 | | Michela Lorigiola | 48 |
| 4 | | Yohan Rossel | 98 | | Konstantin Aleksandrov | 85 | | Yaco ACCR Team | 50 | | Fabrizio Zaldivar | 78 | | Elia De Guio | 25 | | Freddy Loix | 83 | | Hans van Goor | 43 |
| 5 | | Nikolay Gryazin | 85 | | Valentin Sarreaud | 69 | | Saintéloc Junior Team | 40 | | Mikołaj Marczyk | 67 | | Alejandro López Fernández | 12 | 3 | Eamonn Boland | 59 | | Jörgen Fornander | 25 |

=== WRC-3 Rally3 ===
No Rally3 crews entered the round.

==== Championship standings ====
- **Bold text** indicates 2022 World Champions.

| Pos. | Open Drivers' championships | | | Open Co-drivers' championships | | |
| Pos. | Move | Driver | Points | Move | Co-driver | Points |
|---|---|---|---|---|---|---|
| 1 | | **Lauri Joona** | 111 | | **Enni Mälkönen** | 87 |
| 2 | | Jan Černý | 104 | | Mikael Korhonen | 86 |
| 3 | | Sami Pajari | 87 | | Tamás Kürti | 73 |
| 4 | | Zoltán László | 73 | | Liam Regan | 63 |
| 5 | | William Creighton | 63 | | Manuel Fenoli | 48 |

| Previous rally: 2022 Rally Catalunya | 2022 FIA World Rally Championship | Next rally: 2023 Monte Carlo Rally (2023) |
| Previous rally: 2010 Rally Japan; 2020 and 2021 editions cancelled | 2022 Rally Japan | Next rally: 2023 Rally Japan |
