= 2022 Rally Finland =

Motor rally competition

2022 Rally Finland Secto Rally Finland 2022
Round 8 of 13 in the 2022 World Rally Championship
← Previous event	Next event →
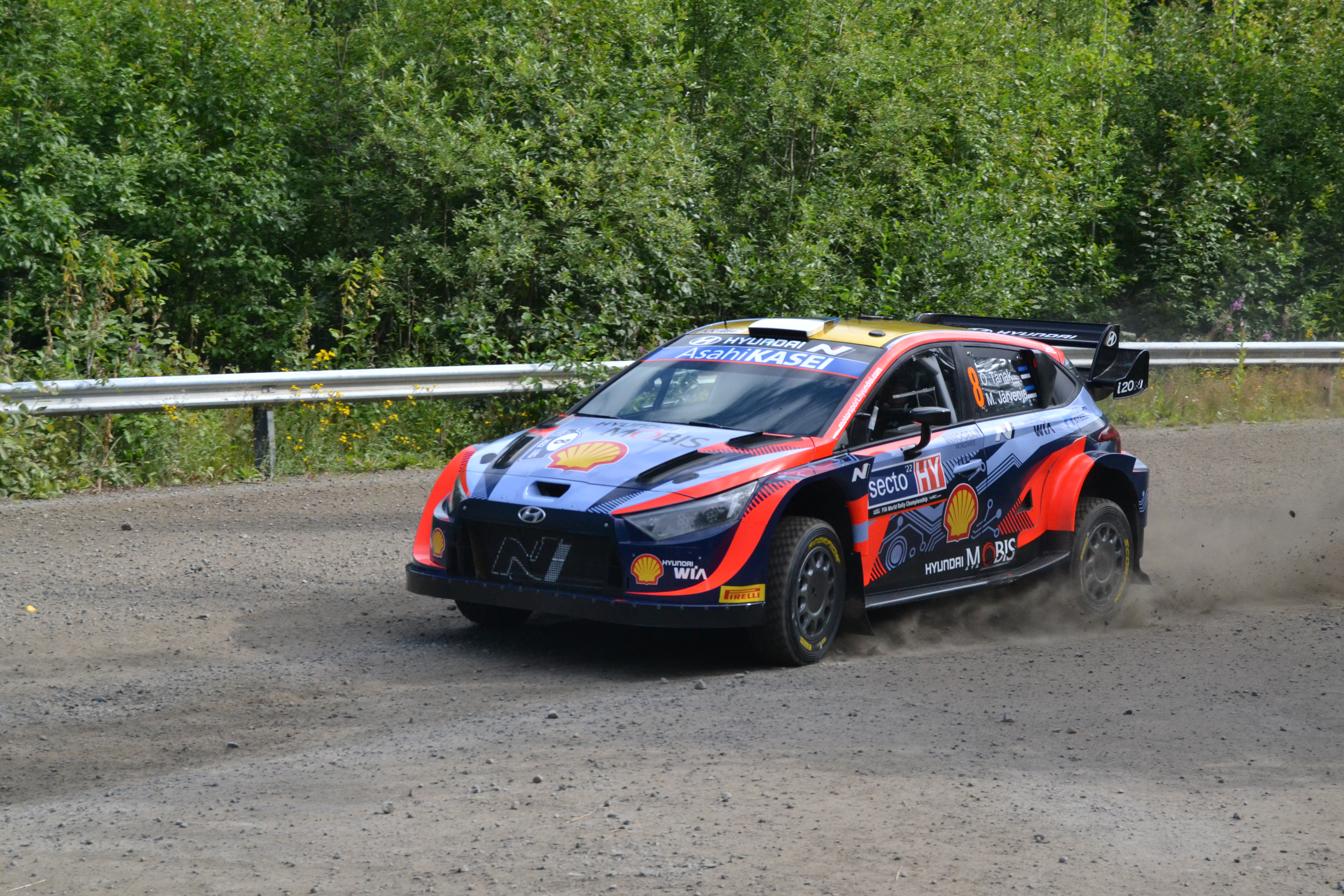
- Rally Finland has the fastest average speed of any event on the calendar.
- Host country: Finland
- Rally base: Jyväskylä, Central Finland
- Dates run: 4 – 7 August 2022
- Start location: Jyväskylä, Central Finland
- Finish location: Ruuhimäki, Toivakka
- Stages: 22 (322.61 km; 200.46 miles)
- Stage surface: Gravel
- Transport distance: 1,104.86 km (686.53 miles)
- Overall distance: 1,427.47 km (886.99 miles)

Statistics
- Crews registered: 45
- Crews: 43 at start, 34 at finish
- Cancellation: SS5 cancelled due to safety concern.

Overall results
- Overall winner: (Estonia) Ott Tänak (Estonia) Martin Järveoja (South Korea) Hyundai Shell Mobis WRT; 2:24:04.6
- Power Stage winner: (Finland) Kalle Rovanperä (Finland) Jonne Halttunen (Japan) Toyota Gazoo Racing WRT; 5:17.1

Support category results
- WRC-2 winner: (Finland) Emil Lindholm (Finland) Reeta Hämäläinen (Germany) Toksport WRT 2; 2:33:43.6
- WRC-3 winner: (Finland) Lauri Joona (Finland) Tuukka Shemeikka; 2:42:52.5

The 2022 Rally Finland (also known as the Secto Rally Finland 2022) was a motor racing event for rally cars that was held over four days between 4 and 7 August 2022. It marked the seventy-first running of the Rally Finland. The event was the eighth round of the 2022 World Rally Championship, World Rally Championship-2 and World Rally Championship-3. The 2022 event was based in Jyväskylä in Central Finland and was contested over twenty-two special stages covering a total competitive distance of 322.61 km (200.46 mi).

Elfyn Evans and Scott Martin were the defending rally winners. Their team, Toyota Gazoo Racing WRT, were the defending manufacturers' winners. Teemu Suninen and Mikko Markkula were the defending rally winners in the WRC-2 category. Emil Lindholm and Reeta Hämäläinen were the defending rally winners in the WRC-3 category.

Ott Tänak and Martin Järveoja were the overall winners, securing their second win of the season. Their team, Hyundai Shell Mobis WRT, claimed their first ever Rally Finland victory. Emil Lindholm and Reeta Hämäläinen won the World Rally Championship-2 category after Teemu Suninen and Mikko Markkula were disqualified due to the front bumper of their Hyundai was found underweight. Lauri Joona and Tuukka Shemeikka won the World Rally Championship-3 category.

== Background ==
=== Entry list ===
The following crews entered into the rally. The event was opened to crews competing in the World Rally Championship, its support categories, the World Rally Championship-2 and World Rally Championship-3, and privateer entries that were not registered to score points in any championship. Twelve entered under Rally1 regulations, as were seventeen Rally2 crews in the World Rally Championship-2 and five Rally3 crews in the World Rally Championship-3.

Rally1 entries competing in the World Rally Championship
No.	Driver	Co-Driver	Entrant	Car	Championship eligibility	Tyre
2	(Sweden) Oliver Solberg	(United Kingdom) Elliott Edmondson	(South Korea) Hyundai Shell Mobis WRT	Hyundai i20 N Rally1	Driver, Co-driver, Manufacturer	P
4	(Finland) Esapekka Lappi	(Finland) Janne Ferm	(Japan) Toyota Gazoo Racing WRT	Toyota GR Yaris Rally1	Driver, Co-driver, Manufacturer	P
7	(France) Pierre-Louis Loubet	(France) Vincent Landais	(United Kingdom) M-Sport Ford WRT	Ford Puma Rally1	Driver, Co-driver	P
8	(Estonia) Ott Tänak	(Estonia) Martin Järveoja	(South Korea) Hyundai Shell Mobis WRT	Hyundai i20 N Rally1	Driver, Co-driver, Manufacturer	P
11	(Belgium) Thierry Neuville	(Belgium) Martijn Wydaeghe	(South Korea) Hyundai Shell Mobis WRT	Hyundai i20 N Rally1	Driver, Co-driver, Manufacturer	P
16	(France) Adrien Fourmaux	(France) Alexandre Coria	(United Kingdom) M-Sport Ford WRT	Ford Puma Rally1	Driver, Co-driver, Manufacturer	P
18	(Japan) Takamoto Katsuta	(Republic of Ireland) Aaron Johnston	(Japan) Toyota Gazoo Racing WRT NG	Toyota GR Yaris Rally1	Driver, Co-driver, Manufacturer/Team	P
33	(United Kingdom) Elfyn Evans	(United Kingdom) Scott Martin	(Japan) Toyota Gazoo Racing WRT	Toyota GR Yaris Rally1	Driver, Co-driver, Manufacturer	P
42	(Republic of Ireland) Craig Breen	(Republic of Ireland) Paul Nagle	(United Kingdom) M-Sport Ford WRT	Ford Puma Rally1	Driver, Co-driver, Manufacturer	P
44	(United Kingdom) Gus Greensmith	(Sweden) Jonas Andersson	(United Kingdom) M-Sport Ford WRT	Ford Puma Rally1	Driver, Co-driver, Manufacturer	P
68	(Finland) Jari Huttunen	(Finland) Mikko Lukka	(United Kingdom) M-Sport Ford WRT	Ford Puma Rally1	Driver, Co-driver	P
69	(Finland) Kalle Rovanperä	(Finland) Jonne Halttunen	(Japan) Toyota Gazoo Racing WRT	Toyota GR Yaris Rally1	Driver, Co-driver, Manufacturer	P

Rally2 entries competing in the World Rally Championship-2
No.	Driver	Co-Driver	Entrant	Car	Championship eligibility	Tyre
20	(Finland) Emil Lindholm	(Finland) Reeta Hämäläinen	(Germany) Toksport WRT 2	Škoda Fabia Rally2 evo	Junior Driver, Co-driver, Team	P
21	(Finland) Teemu Suninen	(Finland) Mikko Markkula	(South Korea) Hyundai Motorsport N	Hyundai i20 N Rally2	Driver, Co-driver, Team	P
22	(Estonia) Egon Kaur	(Estonia) Silver Simm	(Estonia) Egon Kaur	Volkswagen Polo GTI R5	Driver, Co-driver	P
23	(Finland) Teemu Asunmaa	(Finland) Ville Mannisenmäki	(Finland) Teemu Asunmaa	Škoda Fabia Rally2 evo	Driver, Co-driver	P
24	(Finland) Mikko Heikkilä	(Finland) Samu Vaaleri	(Finland) Mikko Heikkilä	Škoda Fabia Rally2 evo	Junior Driver, Junior Co-driver	P
25	(New Zealand) Hayden Paddon	(New Zealand) John Kennard	(New Zealand) Hayden Paddon	Hyundai i20 N Rally2	Driver, Co-driver	P
26	Nikolay Gryazin (Note: Nikolay Gryazin is Russian, but he competes as a neutral competitor using the ANA flag as Russian national emblems were banned by the association due to the Russian invasion of Ukraine.)	Konstantin Aleksandrov (Note: Konstantin Aleksandrov is Russian, but he competes as a neutral competitor using the ANA flag as Russian national emblems were banned by the association due to the Russian invasion of Ukraine.)	(Germany) Toksport WRT 2	Škoda Fabia Rally2 evo	Junior Driver, Co-driver, Team	P
27	(Finland) Sami Pajari	(Finland) Enni Mälkönen	(Finland) Sami Pajari	Škoda Fabia Rally2 evo	Junior Driver, Co-driver	P
28	(Finland) Eerik Pietarinen	(Finland) Antti Linnaketo	(Finland) Eerik Pietarinen	Volkswagen Polo GTI R5	Junior Driver, Co-driver	P
29	(Poland) Mikołaj Marczyk	(Poland) Szymon Gospodarczyk	(Poland) Mikołaj Marczyk	Škoda Fabia Rally2 evo	Junior Driver, Co-driver	P
30	(Estonia) Georg Linnamäe	(United Kingdom) James Morgan	(Estonia) ALM Motorsport	Volkswagen Polo GTI R5	Junior Driver, Co-driver	—N/a
31	(Czech Republic) Martin Prokop	(Czech Republic) Michal Ernst	(Czech Republic) Martin Prokop	Ford Fiesta Rally2	Driver, Co-driver	P
32	(India) Gaurav Gill	(Brazil) Gabriel Morales	(India) Gaurav Gill	Škoda Fabia R5	Driver, Co-driver	P
34	(Paraguay) Fabrizio Zaldivar	(Argentina) Marcelo Der Ohannesian	(South Korea) Hyundai Motorsport N	Hyundai i20 N Rally2	Junior Driver, Co-driver, Team	P
35	(Republic of Ireland) Josh McErlean	(Republic of Ireland) James Fulton	(Republic of Ireland) Josh McErlean	Hyundai i20 N Rally2	Junior Driver, Co-driver	P
36	(Finland) Riku Tahko	(Finland) Sami Ryynänen	(Finland) Riku Tahko	Hyundai i20 N Rally2	Driver, Co-driver	P
37	(Belgium) Freddy Loix	(Belgium) Pieter Tsjoen	(Belgium) Freddy Loix	Škoda Fabia Rally2 evo	Masters Driver, Co-driver	P

Rally3 entries competing in the World Rally Championship-3
No.	Driver	Co-Driver	Entrant	Car	Championship eligibility	Tyre
38	(Finland) Lauri Joona	(Finland) Tuukka Shemeikka	(Finland) Lauri Joona	Ford Fiesta Rally3	Open	P
39	(Czech Republic) Jan Černý	(Czech Republic) Jan Tománek	(Czech Republic) Jan Černý	Ford Fiesta Rally3	Open	P
40	(Finland) Toni Herranen	(Finland) Sebastian Virtanen	(Finland) Toni Herranen	Ford Fiesta Rally3	Open	P
41	(Finland) Tommi Heino	(Finland) Patric Öhman	(Finland) Tommi Heino	Ford Fiesta Rally3	Open	P
43	(Finland) Henri Timonen	(Finland) Jussi Kärpijoki	(Finland) Henri Timonen	Ford Fiesta Rally3	Open	P

=== Itinerary ===
All dates and times are EEST (UTC+3).

Date	Time	No.	Stage name	Distance
4 August	9:01	—	Rannankylä [Shakedown]	4.48 km
4 August	19:08	SS1	Harju 1	3.48 km
5 August	8:00	SS2	Laukaa 1	11.75 km
5 August	8:55	SS3	Lankamaa 1	21.69 km
5 August	12:15	SS4	Laukaa 2	11.75 km
5 August	13:10	SS5	Lankamaa 2	21.69 km
5 August	14:30	SS6	Harju 2	2.01 km
5 August	17:00	SS7	Ässämäki 1	12.31 km
5 August	17:53	SS8	Sahloinen-Moksi 1	15.70 km
5 August	19:13	SS9	Ässämäki 2	12.31 km
5 August	20:06	SS10	Sahloinen-Moksi 2	15.70 km
6 August	8:08	SS11	Päijälä 1	20.19 km
6 August	9:08	SS12	Rapsula 1	20.56 km
6 August	10:08	SS13	Patajoki 1	13.75 km
6 August	11:08	SS14	Vekkula 1	20.65 km
6 August	15:38	SS15	Päijälä 2	20.19 km
6 August	16:38	SS16	Rapsula 2	20.56 km
6 August	17:38	SS17	Patajoki 2	13.75 km
6 August	18:38	SS18	Vekkula 2	20.65 km
7 August	8:23	SS19	Oittila 1	10.84 km
7 August	9:38	SS20	Ruuhimäki 1	11.12 km
7 August	11:01	SS21	Oittila 2	10.84 km
7 August	13:18	SS22	Ruuhimäki 2 [Power Stage]	11.12 km

== Report ==
=== WRC Rally1 ===
==== Classification ====
Position		No.	Driver	Co-driver	Entrant	Car	Time	Difference	Points	
Event	Class	No.	Driver	Co-driver	Entrant	Car	Time	Difference	Event	Stage
1	1	8	Ott Tänak	Martin Järveoja	Hyundai Shell Mobis WRT	Hyundai i20 N Rally1	2:24:04.6	0.0	25	2
2	2	69	Kalle Rovanperä	Jonne Halttunen	Toyota Gazoo Racing WRT	Toyota GR Yaris Rally1	2:24:11.4	+6.8	18	5
3	3	4	Esapekka Lappi	Janne Ferm	Toyota Gazoo Racing WRT	Toyota GR Yaris Rally1	2:25:25.3	+1:20.7	15	0
4	4	33	Elfyn Evans	Scott Martin	Toyota Gazoo Racing WRT	Toyota GR Yaris Rally1	2:25:42.2	+1:37.6	12	3
5	5	11	Thierry Neuville	Martijn Wydaeghe	Hyundai Shell Mobis WRT	Hyundai i20 N Rally1	2:26:22.6	+2:18.0	10	1
6	6	18	Takamoto Katsuta	Aaron Johnston	Toyota Gazoo Racing WRT NG	Toyota GR Yaris Rally1	2:27:13.6	+3:09.0	8	0
7	7	44	Gus Greensmith	Jonas Andersson	M-Sport Ford WRT	Ford Puma Rally1	2:28:01.6	+3:57.0	6	0
9	8	68	Jari Huttunen	Mikko Lukka	M-Sport Ford WRT	Ford Puma Rally1	2:34:36.2	+10:31.6	2	0
18	9	16	Adrien Fourmaux	Alexandre Coria	M-Sport Ford WRT	Ford Puma Rally1	2:47:02.5	+22:57.9	0	0
32	10	42	Craig Breen	Paul Nagle	M-Sport Ford WRT	Ford Puma Rally1	3:35:00.5	+1:10:55.9	0	4
Retired SS22		7	Pierre-Louis Loubet	Vincent Landais	M-Sport Ford WRT	Ford Puma Rally1	Electrical		0	0
Retired SS2		2	Oliver Solberg	Elliott Edmondson	Hyundai Shell Mobis WRT	Hyundai i20 N Rally1	Rolled		0	0

==== Special stages ====
Stage	Winners	Car	Time	Class leaders
SD	Rovanperä / Halttunen	Toyota GR Yaris Rally1	1:56.1	—N/a
SS1	Neuville / Wydaeghe	Hyundai i20 N Rally1	2:41.7	Neuville / Wydaeghe
SS2	Tänak / Järveoja	Hyundai i20 N Rally1	5:24.6	Tänak / Järveoja
SS3	Lappi / Ferm	Toyota GR Yaris Rally1	9:59.0	Tänak / Järveoja
SS4	Tänak / Järveoja	Hyundai i20 N Rally1	5:19.9	Tänak / Järveoja
SS5	Stage cancelled			
SS6	Katsuta / Johnston	Toyota GR Yaris Rally1	1:33.5	Tänak / Järveoja
SS7	Tänak / Järveoja	Hyundai i20 N Rally1	5:42.5	Tänak / Järveoja
SS8	Lappi / Ferm	Toyota GR Yaris Rally1	7:10.4	Tänak / Järveoja
SS9	Lappi / Ferm	Toyota GR Yaris Rally1	5:37.6	Tänak / Järveoja
SS10	Lappi / Ferm	Toyota GR Yaris Rally1	7:05.9	Tänak / Järveoja
SS11	Evans / Martin	Toyota GR Yaris Rally1	9:38.1	Tänak / Järveoja
SS12	Rovanperä / Halttunen	Toyota GR Yaris Rally1	9:57.6	Tänak / Järveoja
SS13	Rovanperä / Halttunen	Toyota GR Yaris Rally1	6:34.2	Tänak / Järveoja
SS14	Tänak / Järveoja	Hyundai i20 N Rally1	10:12.6	Tänak / Järveoja
SS15	Rovanperä / Halttunen	Toyota GR Yaris Rally1	9:27.9	Tänak / Järveoja
SS16	Rovanperä / Halttunen	Toyota GR Yaris Rally1	9:35.8	Tänak / Järveoja
SS17	Tänak / Järveoja; Rovanperä / Halttunen	Hyundai i20 N Rally1; Toyota GR Yaris Rally1	6:25.2	Tänak / Järveoja
SS18	Rovanperä / Halttunen	Toyota GR Yaris Rally1	9:56.8	Tänak / Järveoja
SS19	Tänak / Järveoja	Hyundai i20 N Rally1	5:19.5	Tänak / Järveoja
SS20	Tänak / Järveoja; Rovanperä / Halttunen	Hyundai i20 N Rally1; Toyota GR Yaris Rally1	5:22.9	Tänak / Järveoja
SS21	Rovanperä / Halttunen	Toyota GR Yaris Rally1	5:17.6	Tänak / Järveoja
SS22	Rovanperä / Halttunen	Toyota GR Yaris Rally1	5:17.1	Tänak / Järveoja

==== Championship standings ====
Pos.	Drivers' championships			Co-drivers' championships			Manufacturers' championships		
Pos.	Move	Driver	Points	Move	Co-driver	Points	Move	Manufacturer	Points
1		Kalle Rovanperä	198		Jonne Halttunen	198		Toyota Gazoo Racing WRT	339
2	2	Ott Tänak	104	2	Martin Järveoja	104		Hyundai Shell Mobis WRT	251
3	1	Thierry Neuville	103	1	Martijn Wydaeghe	103		M-Sport Ford WRT	174
4	1	Elfyn Evans	94	1	Scott Martin	94		Toyota Gazoo Racing WRT NG	89
5		Takamoto Katsuta	81		Aaron Johnston	81			

=== WRC-2 Rally2 ===
==== Classification ====
Position		No.	Driver	Co-driver	Entrant	Car	Time	Difference	Points		
Event	Class	No.	Driver	Co-driver	Entrant	Car	Time	Difference	Class	Stage	Event
8	1	20	Emil Lindholm	Reeta Hämäläinen	Toksport WRT 2	Škoda Fabia Rally2 evo	2:33:43.6	0.0	25	2	4
10	2	22	Egon Kaur	Silver Simm	Egon Kaur	Volkswagen Polo GTI R5	2:35:36.7	+1:53.1	18	0	1
11	3	25	Hayden Paddon	John Kennard	Hayden Paddon	Hyundai i20 N Rally2	2:35:47.3	+2:03.7	15	0	0
12	4	23	Teemu Asunmaa	Ville Mannisenmäki	Teemu Asunmaa	Škoda Fabia Rally2 evo	2:38:11.8	+4:28.2	12	0	0
13	5	28	Eerik Pietarinen	Antti Linnaketo	Eerik Pietarinen	Volkswagen Polo GTI R5	2:38:39.6	+4:56.0	10	1	0
14	6	29	Mikołaj Marczyk	Szymon Gospodarczyk	Mikołaj Marczyk	Škoda Fabia Rally2 evo	2:39:21.5	+5:37.9	8	0	0
15	7	34	Fabrizio Zaldivar	Marcelo Der Ohannesian	Hyundai Motorsport N	Hyundai i20 N Rally2	2:39:54.4	+6:10.8	6	0	0
17	8	31	Martin Prokop	Michal Ernst	Martin Prokop	Ford Fiesta Rally2	2:43:41.2	+9:57.6	4	0	0
20	9	37	Freddy Loix	Pieter Tsjoen	Freddy Loix	Škoda Fabia Rally2 evo	2:50:41.8	+16:58.2	2	0	0
21	10	27	Sami Pajari	Enni Mälkönen	Sami Pajari	Škoda Fabia Rally2 evo	2:54:20.0	+20:36.4	1	3	0
31	11	32	Gaurav Gill	Gabriel Morales	Gaurav Gill	Škoda Fabia R5	3:25:23.7	+51:40.1	0	0	0
33	12	24	Mikko Heikkilä	Samu Vaaleri	Mikko Heikkilä	Škoda Fabia Rally2 evo	3:46:06.3	+1:12:22.7	0	0	0
34	13	35	Josh McErlean	James Fulton	Josh McErlean	Hyundai i20 N Rally2	4:20:29.5	+1:46:45.9	0	0	0
Disqualified		21	Teemu Suninen	Mikko Markkula	Hyundai Motorsport N	Hyundai i20 N Rally2	Front bumper underweight		0	0	0
Retired SS15		36	Riku Tahko	Sami Ryynänen	Riku Tahko	Hyundai i20 N Rally2	Mechanical		0	0	0
Did not start		26	Nikolay Gryazin	Konstantin Aleksandrov	Toksport WRT 2	Škoda Fabia Rally2 evo	Crash		0	0	0
Did not start		30	Georg Linnamäe	James Morgan	ALM Motorsport	Volkswagen Polo GTI R5	Withdrawn		0	0	0

==== Special stages ====
Stage	Open Championship				Junior Championship				Masters Cup			
Stage	Winners	Car	Time	Class leaders	Winners	Car	Time	Class leaders	Winners	Car	Time	Class leaders
SD	Suninen / Markkula	Hyundai i20 N Rally2	2:05.8	—N/a	Zaldivar / Der Ohannesian	Hyundai i20 N Rally2	2:06.3	—N/a	Loix / Tsjoen	Škoda Fabia Rally2 evo	2:15.2	—N/a
SS1	Marczyk / Gospodarczyk	Škoda Fabia Rally2 evo	2:50.5	Marczyk / Gospodarczyk	Marczyk / Gospodarczyk	Škoda Fabia Rally2 evo	2:50.5	Marczyk / Gospodarczyk	Loix / Tsjoen	Škoda Fabia Rally2 evo	2:56.8	Loix / Tsjoen
SS2	Suninen / Markkula	Hyundai i20 N Rally2	5:40.9	Suninen / Markkula	Lindholm / Hämäläinen	Škoda Fabia Rally2 evo	5:44.1	Lindholm / Hämäläinen	Loix / Tsjoen	Škoda Fabia Rally2 evo	6:08.5	Loix / Tsjoen
SS3	Suninen / Markkula	Hyundai i20 N Rally2	10:31.5	Suninen / Markkula	Heikkilä / Vaaleri	Škoda Fabia Rally2 evo	10:32.4	Heikkilä / Vaaleri	Loix / Tsjoen	Škoda Fabia Rally2 evo	16:03.4	Loix / Tsjoen
SS4	Suninen / Markkula	Hyundai i20 N Rally2	5:37.1	Suninen / Markkula	Pajari / Mälkönen	Škoda Fabia Rally2 evo	5:38.8	Heikkilä / Vaaleri	Loix / Tsjoen	Škoda Fabia Rally2 evo	5:59.5	Loix / Tsjoen
SS5	Stage cancelled											
SS6	Lindholm / Hämäläinen	Škoda Fabia Rally2 evo	1:37.5	Suninen / Markkula	Lindholm / Hämäläinen	Škoda Fabia Rally2 evo	1:37.5	Lindholm / Hämäläinen	Loix / Tsjoen	Škoda Fabia Rally2 evo	1:41.6	Loix / Tsjoen
SS7	Suninen / Markkula	Hyundai i20 N Rally2	6:06.0	Suninen / Markkula	Heikkilä / Vaaleri	Škoda Fabia Rally2 evo	6:06.1	Heikkilä / Vaaleri	Loix / Tsjoen	Škoda Fabia Rally2 evo	6:45.0	Loix / Tsjoen
SS8	Suninen / Markkula	Hyundai i20 N Rally2	7:40.2	Suninen / Markkula	Pietarinen / Linnaketo	Volkswagen Polo GTI R5	7:40.9	Heikkilä / Vaaleri	Loix / Tsjoen	Škoda Fabia Rally2 evo	8:27.6	Loix / Tsjoen
SS9	Suninen / Markkula	Hyundai i20 N Rally2	6:01.3	Suninen / Markkula	Pajari / Mälkönen	Škoda Fabia Rally2 evo	6:03.3	Heikkilä / Vaaleri	Loix / Tsjoen	Škoda Fabia Rally2 evo	6:30.7	Loix / Tsjoen
SS10	Suninen / Markkula	Hyundai i20 N Rally2	7:34.4	Suninen / Markkula	Lindholm / Hämäläinen	Škoda Fabia Rally2 evo	7:35.6	Lindholm / Hämäläinen	Loix / Tsjoen	Škoda Fabia Rally2 evo	8:05.4	Loix / Tsjoen
SS11	Lindholm / Hämäläinen	Škoda Fabia Rally2 evo	10:19.0	Suninen / Markkula	Lindholm / Hämäläinen	Škoda Fabia Rally2 evo	10:19.0	Lindholm / Hämäläinen	Loix / Tsjoen	Škoda Fabia Rally2 evo	11:42.8	Loix / Tsjoen
SS12	Lindholm / Hämäläinen	Škoda Fabia Rally2 evo	10:37.3	Suninen / Markkula	Lindholm / Hämäläinen	Škoda Fabia Rally2 evo	10:37.3	Lindholm / Hämäläinen	Loix / Tsjoen	Škoda Fabia Rally2 evo	11:33.0	Loix / Tsjoen
SS13	Lindholm / Hämäläinen	Škoda Fabia Rally2 evo	7:05.7	Suninen / Markkula	Lindholm / Hämäläinen	Škoda Fabia Rally2 evo	7:05.7	Lindholm / Hämäläinen	Loix / Tsjoen	Škoda Fabia Rally2 evo	7:40.6	Loix / Tsjoen
SS14	Lindholm / Hämäläinen	Škoda Fabia Rally2 evo	10:51.3	Suninen / Markkula	Lindholm / Hämäläinen	Škoda Fabia Rally2 evo	10:51.3	Lindholm / Hämäläinen	Loix / Tsjoen	Škoda Fabia Rally2 evo	11:33.3	Loix / Tsjoen
SS15	Suninen / Markkula	Hyundai i20 N Rally2	10:06.3	Suninen / Markkula	Lindholm / Hämäläinen	Škoda Fabia Rally2 evo	10:06.9	Lindholm / Hämäläinen	Loix / Tsjoen	Škoda Fabia Rally2 evo	10:51.7	Loix / Tsjoen
SS16	Suninen / Markkula	Hyundai i20 N Rally2	10:15.2	Suninen / Markkula	Lindholm / Hämäläinen	Škoda Fabia Rally2 evo	10:16.6	Lindholm / Hämäläinen	Loix / Tsjoen	Škoda Fabia Rally2 evo	11:01.8	Loix / Tsjoen
SS17	Suninen / Markkula	Hyundai i20 N Rally2	6:52.7	Suninen / Markkula	Lindholm / Hämäläinen	Škoda Fabia Rally2 evo	6:54.8	Lindholm / Hämäläinen	Loix / Tsjoen	Škoda Fabia Rally2 evo	7:26.8	Loix / Tsjoen
SS18	Suninen / Markkula	Hyundai i20 N Rally2	10:38.5	Suninen / Markkula	Lindholm / Hämäläinen	Škoda Fabia Rally2 evo	10:39.4	Lindholm / Hämäläinen	Loix / Tsjoen	Škoda Fabia Rally2 evo	11:20.3	Loix / Tsjoen
SS19	Suninen / Markkula	Hyundai i20 N Rally2	5:43.6	Suninen / Markkula	Lindholm / Hämäläinen	Škoda Fabia Rally2 evo	5:44.0	Lindholm / Hämäläinen	Loix / Tsjoen	Škoda Fabia Rally2 evo	6:19.3	Loix / Tsjoen
SS20	Heikkilä / Vaaleri	Škoda Fabia Rally2 evo	5:45.2	Suninen / Markkula	Heikkilä / Vaaleri	Škoda Fabia Rally2 evo	5:45.2	Lindholm / Hämäläinen	Loix / Tsjoen	Škoda Fabia Rally2 evo	6:17.8	Loix / Tsjoen
SS21	Lindholm / Hämäläinen	Škoda Fabia Rally2 evo	5:38.4	Suninen / Markkula	Lindholm / Hämäläinen	Škoda Fabia Rally2 evo	5:38.4	Lindholm / Hämäläinen	Loix / Tsjoen	Škoda Fabia Rally2 evo	6:07.9	Loix / Tsjoen
SS22	Pajari / Mälkönen	Škoda Fabia Rally2 evo	5:40.8	Suninen / Markkula	Pajari / Mälkönen	Škoda Fabia Rally2 evo	5:40.8	Lindholm / Hämäläinen	Loix / Tsjoen	Škoda Fabia Rally2 evo	6:08.0	Loix / Tsjoen

==== Championship standings ====
Pos.	Open Drivers' championships			Open Co-drivers' championships			Teams' championships			Junior Drivers' championships			Junior Co-drivers' championships			Driver Masters' championships			Co-driver Masters' championships		
Pos.	Move	Driver	Points	Move	Co-driver	Points	Move	Manufacturer	Points	Move	Manufacturer	Points	Move	Driver	Points	Move	Driver	Points	Move	Driver	Points
1		Andreas Mikkelsen	79		Torstein Eriksen	79	1	Hyundai Motorsport N	116	2	Emil Lindholm	83		James Fulton	111		Mauro Miele	86		Laurent Magat	75
2		Kajetan Kajetanowicz	76		Maciej Szczepaniak	76	1	Toksport WRT	112	1	Chris Ingram	67	2	Samu Vaaleri	50	1	Freddy Loix	65		Michael Joseph Morrissey	36
3	4	Emil Lindholm	64	4	Reeta Hämäläinen	64		Toksport WRT 2	58	1	Nikolay Gryazin	61	1	Louis Louka	43	1	Jean-Michel Raoux	52		Michela Lorigiola	30
4	1	Yohan Rossel	63	1	Valentin Sarreaud	52		Yaco ACCR Team	50	2	Mikołaj Marczyk	59	1	Elia De Guio	25		Olivier Burri	33		Jörgen Fornander	25
5	1	Nikolay Gryazin	52	1	Konstantin Aleksandrov	52		Saintéloc Junior Team	40	2	Eerik Pietarinen	58					Fabrizio Arengi	28		Hans van Goor	25

=== WRC-3 Rally3 ===
==== Classification ====
Position		No.	Driver	Co-driver	Entrant	Car	Time	Difference	Points
Event	Class	No.	Driver	Co-driver	Entrant	Car	Time	Difference	Open
16	1	38	Lauri Joona	Tuukka Shemeikka	Lauri Joona	Ford Fiesta Rally3	2:42:52.5	0.0	25
19	2	39	Jan Černý	Jan Tománek	Jan Černý	Ford Fiesta Rally3	2:47:16.3	+4:23.8	18
27	3	43	Henri Timonen	Jussi Kärpijoki	Henri Timonen	Ford Fiesta Rally3	3:01:13.7	+18:21.2	15
28	4	40	Toni Herranen	Sebastian Virtanen	Toni Herranen	Ford Fiesta Rally3	3:01:58.0	+19:05.5	12
Retired SS3		41	Tommi Heino	Patric Öhman	Tommi Heino	Ford Fiesta Rally3	Crash		0

==== Special stages ====
Stage	Open Championship			
Stage	Winners	Car	Time	Class leaders
SD	Joona / Shemeikka	Ford Fiesta Rally3	2:12.9	—N/a
SS1	Joona / Shemeikka	Ford Fiesta Rally3	3:04.6	Joona / Shemeikka
SS2	Joona / Shemeikka	Ford Fiesta Rally3	6:04.7	Joona / Shemeikka
SS3	Joona / Shemeikka	Ford Fiesta Rally3	11:10.7	Joona / Shemeikka
SS4	Joona / Shemeikka	Ford Fiesta Rally3	5:58.6	Joona / Shemeikka
SS5	Stage cancelled			
SS6	Černý / Tománek	Ford Fiesta Rally3	1:44.7	Joona / Shemeikka
SS7	Joona / Shemeikka	Ford Fiesta Rally3	6:28.6	Joona / Shemeikka
SS8	Joona / Shemeikka	Ford Fiesta Rally3	8:03.4	Joona / Shemeikka
SS9	Joona / Shemeikka	Ford Fiesta Rally3	6:22.4	Joona / Shemeikka
SS10	Joona / Shemeikka	Ford Fiesta Rally3	8:00.5	Joona / Shemeikka
SS11	Joona / Shemeikka	Ford Fiesta Rally3	11:10.3	Joona / Shemeikka
SS12	Joona / Shemeikka	Ford Fiesta Rally3	11:13.2	Joona / Shemeikka
SS13	Joona / Shemeikka	Ford Fiesta Rally3	7:30.6	Joona / Shemeikka
SS14	Joona / Shemeikka	Ford Fiesta Rally3	11:25.5	Joona / Shemeikka
SS15	Joona / Shemeikka	Ford Fiesta Rally3	10:44.8	Joona / Shemeikka
SS16	Joona / Shemeikka	Ford Fiesta Rally3	10:55.9	Joona / Shemeikka
SS17	Joona / Shemeikka	Ford Fiesta Rally3	7:23.3	Joona / Shemeikka
SS18	Joona / Shemeikka	Ford Fiesta Rally3	11:19.7	Joona / Shemeikka
SS19	Joona / Shemeikka	Ford Fiesta Rally3	6:04.3	Joona / Shemeikka
SS20	Joona / Shemeikka	Ford Fiesta Rally3	6:04.1	Joona / Shemeikka
SS21	Joona / Shemeikka	Ford Fiesta Rally3	6:00.6	Joona / Shemeikka
SS22	Joona / Shemeikka	Ford Fiesta Rally3	6:01.9	Joona / Shemeikka

==== Championship standings ====
Pos.	Open Drivers' championships			Open Co-drivers' championships		
Pos.	Move	Driver	Points	Move	Co-driver	Points
1		Sami Pajari	87		Enni Mälkönen	87
2		Lauri Joona	86		Mikael Korhonen	61
3	2	Jan Černý	61		Liam Regan	45
4	1	McRae Kimathi	57		Tamás Kürti	43
5	1	William Creighton	45		Mwangi Kioni	42

== Notes ==
Previous rally: 2022 Rally Estonia	2022 FIA World Rally Championship	Next rally: 2022 Ypres Rally
Previous rally: 2021 Rally Finland	2022 Rally Finland	Next rally: 2023 Rally Finland
