= Hyundai i20 N Rally2 =

Hyundai Rally2 rally car

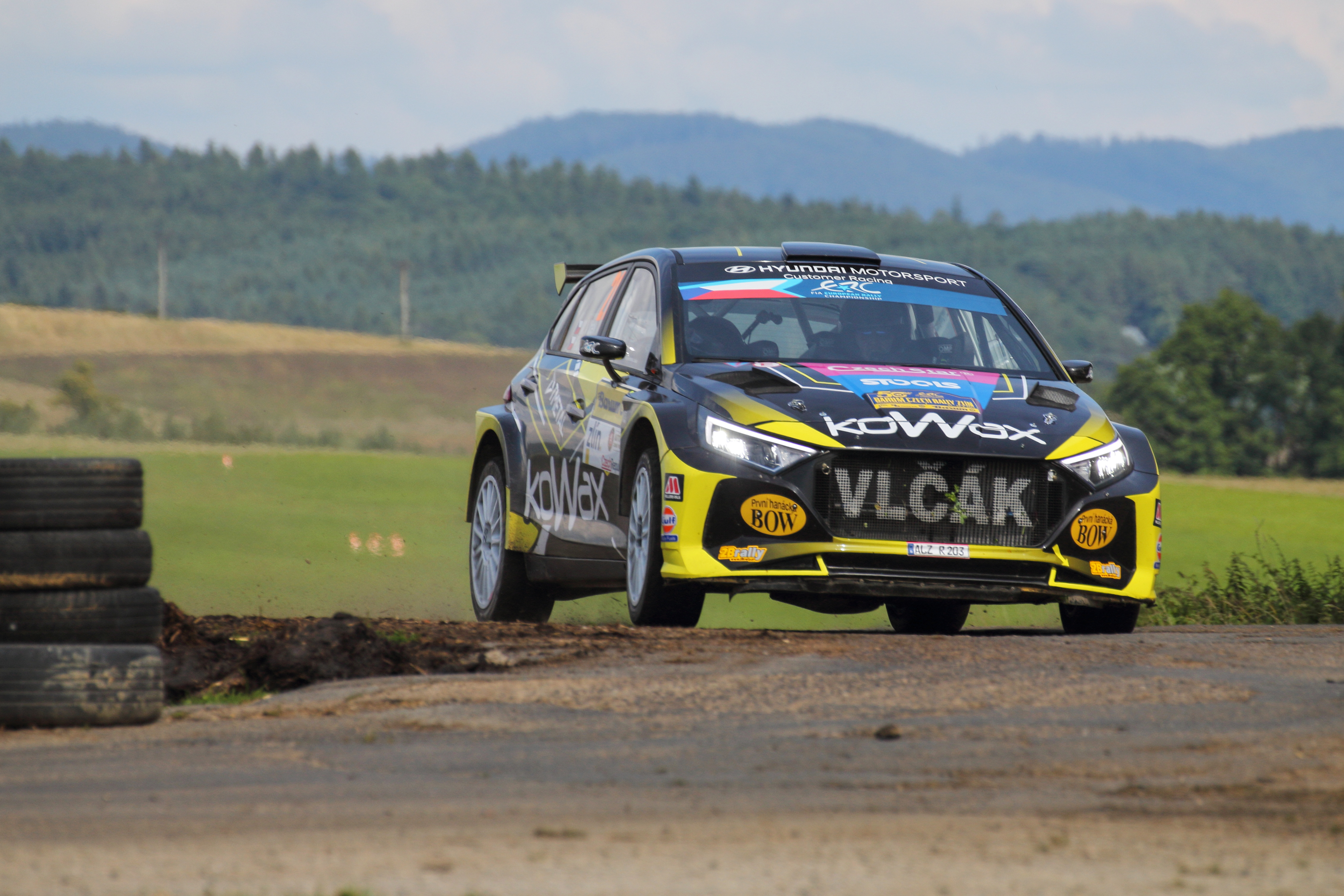
- ERC debut of Hyundai i20 N Rally2
- Category: Group Rally2
- Constructor: Hyundai Motorsport
- Predecessor: Hyundai i20 R5

Technical specifications
- Length: 4,040 mm (159.1 in)
- Width: 1,820 mm (71.7 in)
- Axle track: 1,810 mm (71.3 in)
- Wheelbase: 2,560 mm (100.8 in)
- Engine: 1.6 litre direct injection 1.6 L (98 cu in) 4-cylinder, 16-valve turbocharged
- Transmission: 5-speed sequential 4-wheel drive
- Weight: 1,210 kg (2,667.6 lb)

Competition history
- Notable entrants: Hyundai Motorsport N
- Debut: (Belgium) 2021 Ypres Rally

The Hyundai i20 N Rally2 is a rally car developed and built by Hyundai Motorsport to Group Rally2 specifications. It is based upon the Hyundai i20 N road car and is the successor to Hyundai i20 R5.

== Competition history ==
The car was debuted at the 2021 Ypres Rally. Despite a victory in its competing category from Jari Huttunen and Mikko Lukka, both of the entered crews underwent power steering issue. Oliver Solberg and Aaron Johnston suffered more electrical issue, retiring the rally from the lead.

== Rally victories ==
=== World Rally Championship-2 ===
Year	No.	Event	Surface	Driver	Co-driver
2021	1	(Belgium) 2021 Ypres Rally	Tarmac	(Finland) Jari Huttunen	(Finland) Mikko Lukka
2022	2	2022 Rally New Zealand	Gravel	(New Zealand) Hayden Paddon	(New Zealand) John Kennard
2022	3	(Spain) 2022 Rally Catalunya	Tarmac	(Finland) Teemu Suninen	(Finland) Mikko Markkula
2022	4	2022 Rally Japan	Tarmac	(Luxembourg) Grégoire Munster	(Belgium) Louis Louka

=== World Rally Championship-3 ===
Year	No.	Event	Surface	Driver	Co-driver
2021	1	(Italy) 2021 Rally Monza	Tarmac	(Italy) Andrea Crugnola	(Italy) Pietro Ometto

=== European Rally Championship ===
Year	No.	Event	Surface	Driver	Co-driver
2023	1	(Portugal) 2023 Rally Serras de Fafe e Felgueiras	Gravel	(New Zealand) Hayden Paddon	(New Zealand) John Kennard
2024	2	(United Kingdom) 2024 Rali Ceredigion	Tarmac	(New Zealand) Hayden Paddon	(New Zealand) John Kennard

== Rally results ==
=== WRC-2 results ===
Year	Entrant	Driver	1	2	3	4	5	6	7	8	9	10	11	12	13	Teams	Points
2021	Hyundai Motorsport N	(Finland) Jari Huttunen	MON	ARC	CRO	POR	ITA	KEN	EST	BEL; 1	GRE	FIN; 2	ESP; Ret	MNZ		4th	73
2021	Hyundai Motorsport N	(Sweden) Oliver Solberg	MON	ARC	CRO	POR	ITA	KEN	EST	BEL; Ret	GRE; Ret	FIN; Ret	ESP	MNZ		4th	73
2021	Hyundai Motorsport N	(Finland) Teemu Suninen	MON	ARC	CRO	POR	ITA	KEN	EST	BEL	GRE	FIN	ESP; 2	MNZ		4th	73
2022	Hyundai Motorsport N	(Finland) Teemu Suninen	MON	SWE	CRO	POR; Ret	ITA; 3	KEN	EST; 2	FIN; EX	BEL	GRE; 4	NZL	ESP; 1	JPN; 2	2nd	186
2022	Hyundai Motorsport N	(Paraguay) Fabrizio Zaldivar	MON	SWE	CRO	POR; 1	ITA; 2	KEN	EST; 3	FIN; 1	BEL	GRE; 3	NZL	ESP; 5	JPN; 14	2nd	186

- Season in progress
