= Mikko Markkula =

Finnish rally co-driver (born 1981)

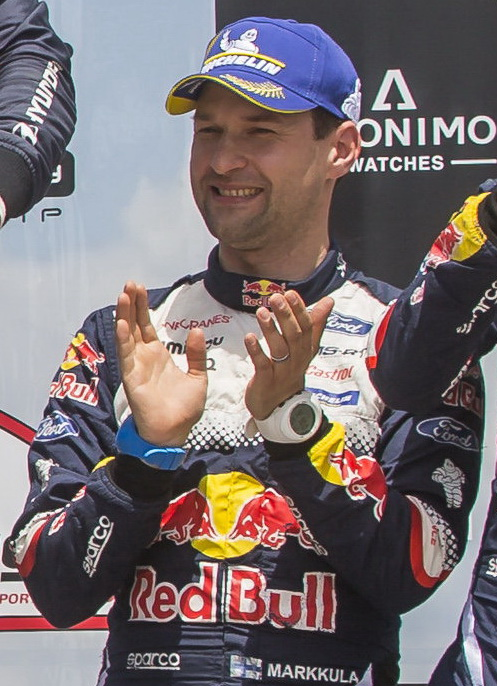
- Mikko Markkula in 2018

Personal information
- Nationality: Finland
- Full name: Mikko Antero Markkula
- Born: January 3, 1981 (age 45)

World Rally Championship record
- Years active: 2001–2019, 2021–present
- Driver: (Finland) Teemu Suninen
- Teams: M-Sport World Rally Team, Hyundai Motorsport
- Rallies: 115
- Championships: 0
- Rally wins: 0
- Podiums: 2
- Stage wins: 19
- First rally: 2001 Rally Finland

Mikko Antero Markkula (born 3 January 1981) is a Finnish rally co-driver.

== Rally career ==
Markkula began his rally career in 2001, co-driving for several drivers in the World Rally Championship.

From 2007 to 2012, Markkula was the co-driver of Juho Hänninen.

In 2013, Markkula started to co-drive for Andreas Mikkelsen in a third Volkswagen Polo R WRC. The crew achieved their first WRC podium in the 2014 Rally Sweden. However, they ended their partnership three rounds later after Argentina, where they finished fourth overall.

Starting from 2015, Markkula firmed a partnership with Teemu Suninen. In 2017, the crew was signed by M-Sport World Rally Team. In the 2018 Rally de Portugal, Markkula gained his second podium finish. He left as Suninen's co-driver at the end of 2018. He was replaced by Marko Salminen.

== Career results ==
=== WRC results ===
Year	Entrant	Car	1	2	3	4	5	6	7	8	9	10	11	12	13	14	15	16	Pos.	Points
2007	RRE Sports	Mitsubishi Lancer Evo IX	MON	SWE; DSQ				ARG; 11		GRE; Ret			NZL; 19			JPN; 23	IRE	GBR; 14	22nd	1
2007	Juho Hänninen	Mitsubishi Lancer WRC 05			NOR; 17	MEX	POR		ITA; 8		FIN; Ret	GER							22nd	1
2007	Juho Hänninen	Mitsubishi Lancer Evo IX												ESP; DSQ	FRA				22nd	1
2008	Ralliart New Zealand	Mitsubishi Lancer Evo IX	MON	SWE; 8	MEX	ARG	JOR	ITA	GRE; 20	TUR	FIN; 13	GER	NZL; 14			JPN; 10	GBR; Ret		19th	1
2008	Juho Hänninen	Mitsubishi Lancer Evo IX												ESP; 29	FRA; 24				19th	1
2009	Juho Hänninen	Škoda Fabia S2000	IRE	NOR	CYP	POR	ARG	ITA	GRC	POL	FIN; 10	AUS	ESP	GBR					NC	0
2010	Juho Hänninen	Škoda Fabia S2000	SWE	MEX	JOR	TUR	NZL	POR; Ret	BUL	FIN; 9	GER	JPN	FRA	ESP	GBR				20th	2
2011	Red Bull Škoda	Škoda Fabia S2000	SWE	MEX; 8	POR	JOR	ITA; 8	ARG	GRE; 8	FIN; 10	GER; 20	AUS	FRA; 26	ESP; 10	GBR				16th	14
2013	Volkswagen Motorsport II	Volkswagen Polo R WRC	MON	SWE	MEX	POR; 6	ARG; 8	GRE; 4	ITA; Ret	FIN; 10	GER	AUS	FRA	ESP; Ret	GBR; 5				11th	36
2014	Volkswagen Motorsport II	Volkswagen Polo R WRC	MON; 7	SWE; 2	MEX; 19	POR; 4	ARG; 4	ITA	POL	FIN	GER	AUS	FRA	ESP	GBR				9th	48
2015	Team Oreca	Citroën DS3 R3T	MON	SWE	MEX	ARG	POR; Ret	ITA; 34		FIN; 54									NC	0
2015	TGS Worldwide	Škoda Fabia S2000							POL; 19						GBR; 11				NC	0
2015	Team Oreca	Ford Fiesta R5									GER; 19	AUS	FRA; 18	ESP; 37					NC	0
2016	Team Oreca	Škoda Fabia R5	MON; 12	SWE; 10		ARG	POR; 46	ITA; 8	POL; 11	FIN; 10	GER; 56	CHN; C	FRA; 15	ESP; 28	GBR; 14	AUS			18th	8
2016	TGS Worldwide	Škoda Fabia R5			MEX; 9														18th	8
2017	M-Sport WRT	Ford Fiesta R5	MON	SWE; 10	MEX	FRA; 8	ARG	POR; 12	ITA			GER; 16	ESP; 8	GBR; 31	AUS				14th	29
2017	M-Sport WRT	Ford Fiesta WRC								POL; 6	FIN; 4								14th	29
2018	M-Sport Ford WRT	Ford Fiesta R5	MON; 18																12th	54
2018	M-Sport Ford WRT	Ford Fiesta WRC		SWE; 8	MEX; 12	FRA	ARG; 9	POR; 3	ITA; 10	FIN; 6	GER; 5	TUR; 4	GBR; Ret	ESP; 11	AUS; Ret				12th	54
2019	Janne Tuohino	Ford Fiesta WRC	MON	SWE; 10	MEX	FRA	ARG	CHL	POR	ITA	FIN	GER	TUR	GBR	ESP	AUS; C			31st	1
2021	M-Sport Ford WRT	Ford Fiesta WRC	MON; Ret	ARC; 8			ITA; 31		EST; 6										11th	29
2021	M-Sport Ford WRT	Ford Fiesta R5 Mk. II			CRO; 10	POR; 8		KEN; WD		BEL; Ret	GRE; WD								11th	29
2021	Movisport	Volkswagen Polo GTI R5										FIN; 8							11th	29
2021	Hyundai Motorsport N	Hyundai i20 N Rally2											ESP; 11						11th	29
2021	Hyundai Shell Mobis WRT	Hyundai i20 Coupe WRC												MNZ; 6					11th	29
2022	Hyundai Motorsport N	Hyundai i20 N Rally2	MON	SWE	CRO	POR; Ret	ITA; 38	KEN	EST; 9	FIN; DSQ	BEL	GRE; 17	NZL	ESP; 11	JPN; 8				20th	9
