= Marco Bulacia =

Bolivian rally driver

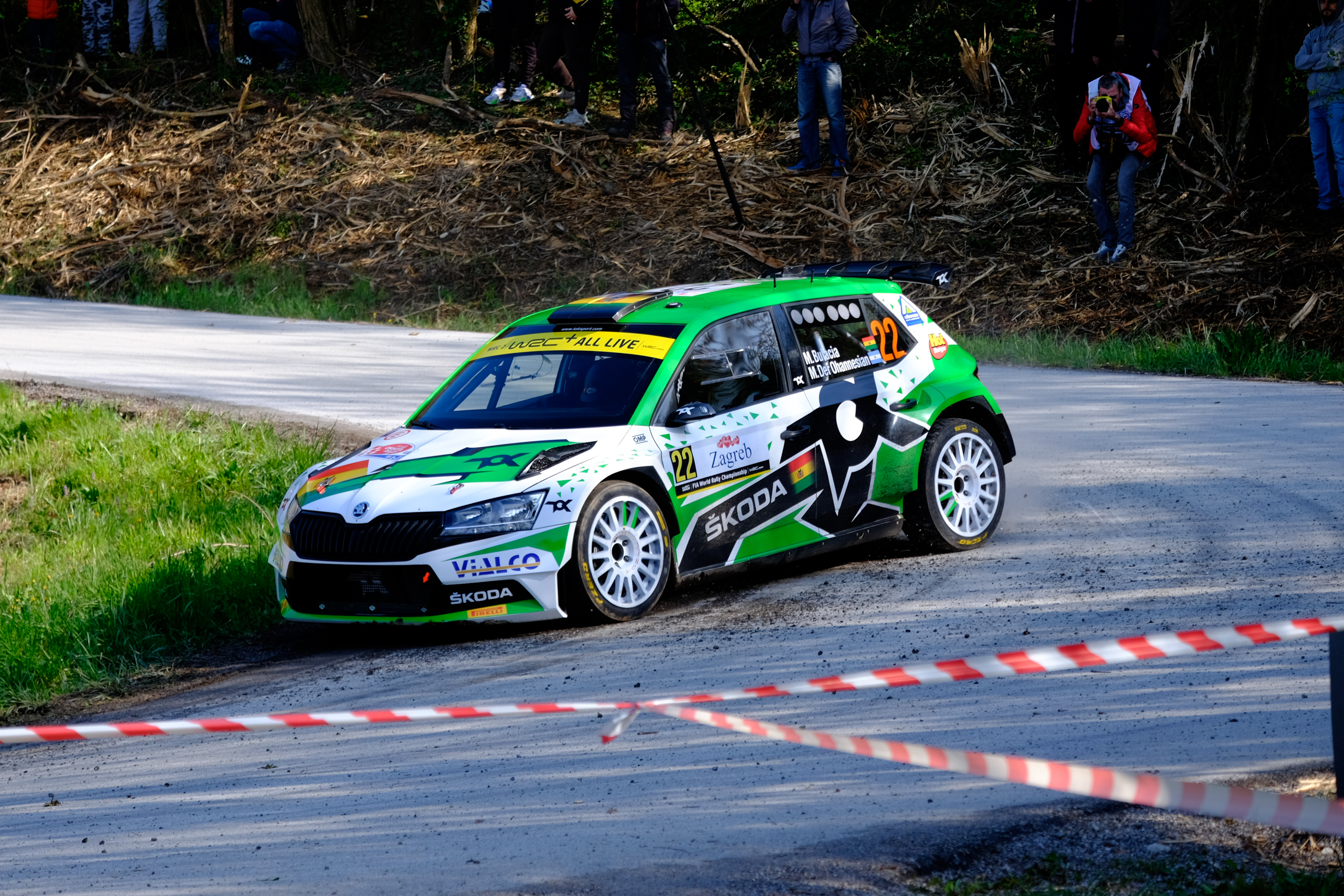

Personal information
- Nationality: (Bolivia) Bolivian
- Full name: Marco Bulacia Wilkinson
- Born: September 27, 2000 (age 26)

World Rally Championship record
- Years active: 2018–present
- Co-driver: (Italy) Giovanni Bernacchini; (Argentina) Marcelo Der Ohannesian; (Spain) Diego Vallejo
- Teams: Škoda; Toksport
- Rallies: 39
- Championships: 0
- Rally wins: 0
- Podiums: 0
- Stage wins: 0
- Total points: 13
- First rally: 2018 Rally Mexico
- Last rally: 2024 Rally Italia Sardegna

Marco Bulacia Wilkinson (Spanish pronunciation: [ˈmaɾ.ko βuˈla.θja wilˈkin.son]; born 27 September 2000) is a Bolivian rally driver. He currently partners with co-driver Diego Vallejo in the WRC-2 category. His younger brother Bruno is also a rally driver.

== Rally career ==
Bulacia made his WRC debut in 2018 Rally Mexico, driving a Ford Fiesta R5. In 2019 Rally Mexico, he scored his first WRC points.

== Rally results ==
=== WRC results ===
Year	Entrant	Car	1	2	3	4	5	6	7	8	9	10	11	12	13	14	Pos.	Points
2018	Marco Bulacia Wilkinson	Ford Fiesta R5	MON	SWE	MEX; 13	FRA	ARG; Ret	POR	ITA	FIN	GER	TUR					NC	0
2018	Marco Bulacia Wilkinson	Škoda Fabia R5											GBR; 18	ESP; 50	AUS		NC	0
2019	Marco Bulacia Wilkinson	Škoda Fabia R5	MON	SWE	MEX; 7	FRA			POR	ITA; 14	FIN	GER	TUR; 13	GBR; 15	ESP; Ret	AUS; C	17th	6
2019	Škoda Motorsport	Škoda Fabia R5					ARG; Ret	CHL; 15									17th	6
2020	Marco Bulacia Wilkinson	Citroën C3 R5	MON	SWE	MEX; 8	EST; 14	TUR; 10	ITA; 11	MNZ; 16								20th	5
2021	Toksport WRT	Škoda Fabia R5 Evo	MON; 15	ARC	CRO; 12	POR; 16	ITA; 10	KEN; WD	EST; 11	BEL	GRE; 10	FIN	ESP; Ret	MNZ; 58			29th	2
2022	Toksport WRT	Škoda Fabia Rally2 evo	MON; Ret	SWE; 33	CRO	POR; Ret	ITA; 27	KEN	EST; Ret	FIN	BEL; 21	GRE	NZL	ESP	JPN		NC	0
2023	Toksport WRT 2	Škoda Fabia RS Rally2	MON; 16	SWE; 13	MEX	CRO	POR; 11	ITA	KEN								NC	0
2023	Toksport WRT	Škoda Fabia RS Rally2								EST; 12	FIN; Ret	GRE; 31	CHL; Ret	EUR	JPN		NC	0
2024	Sports & You	Citroën C3 Rally2	MON	SWE	KEN	CRO	POR; Ret										NC	0
2024	Marco Bulacia	Škoda Fabia RS Rally2						ITA; 51	POL	LAT	FIN	GRE	CHL	EUR	JPN		NC	0

=== WRC-2 results ===
Year	Entrant	Car	1	2	3	4	5	6	7	8	9	10	11	12	13	14	Pos.	Points
2018	Marco Bulacia Wilkinson	Ford Fiesta R5	MON	SWE	MEX; 4	FRA	ARG; Ret	POR	ITA	FIN	GER	TUR					27th	14
2018	Marco Bulacia Wilkinson	Škoda Fabia R5											GBR; 9	ESP; 18	AUS		27th	14
2019	Marco Bulacia Wilkinson	Škoda Fabia R5	MON	SWE	MEX; 2	FRA	ARG	CHL	POR	ITA; 4	FIN	GER	TUR; 2	GBR; 4	ESP; Ret	AUS; C	7th	60
2021	Toksport WRT	Škoda Fabia R5 Evo	MON; 4	ARC	CRO; 3	POR; 6	ITA; 3	KEN; WD	EST; 3	BEL	GRE; 2	FIN	ESP; WD	MNZ; 4			4th	107
2022	Toksport WRT	Škoda Fabia Rally2 evo	MON; Ret	SWE; 15	CRO	POR; Ret	ITA; 19	KEN	EST; Ret	FIN	BEL; 11	GRE	NZL	ESP	JPN		NC	0
2023	Toksport WRT 2	Škoda Fabia RS Rally2	MON; 7	SWE; 5	MEX	CRO	POR; 6	ITA	KEN								14th	36
2023	Toksport WRT	Škoda Fabia RS Rally2								EST; 4	FIN; Ret	GRE; 12	CHL; Ret	EUR	JPN		14th	36
2024	Sports & You	Citroën C3 Rally2	MON	SWE	KEN	CRO	POR; Ret										NC	0
2024	Marco Bulacia	Škoda Fabia RS Rally2						ITA; 26	POL	LAT	FIN	GRE	CHL	EUR	JPN		NC	0

=== WRC-2 Pro results ===
Year	Entrant	Car	1	2	3	4	5	6	7	8	9	10	11	12	13	14	Pos.	Points
2019	Škoda Motorsport	Škoda Fabia R5	MON	SWE	MEX	FRA	ARG; Ret	CHL; 4	POR	ITA	FIN	GER	TUR	GBR	ESP	AUS; C	7th	12

=== WRC-3 results ===
Year	Entrant	Car	1	2	3	4	5	6	7	Pos.	Points
2020	Marco Bulacia Wilkinson	Citroën C3 R5	MON	SWE	MEX; 1	EST; 4	TUR; 2	ITA; 3	MNZ; 6	2nd	78
