= 2023 Rally Finland =

Motor rally competition

2023 Rally Finland Secto Rally Finland 2023
Round 9 of 13 in the 2023 World Rally Championship
← Previous event	Next event →
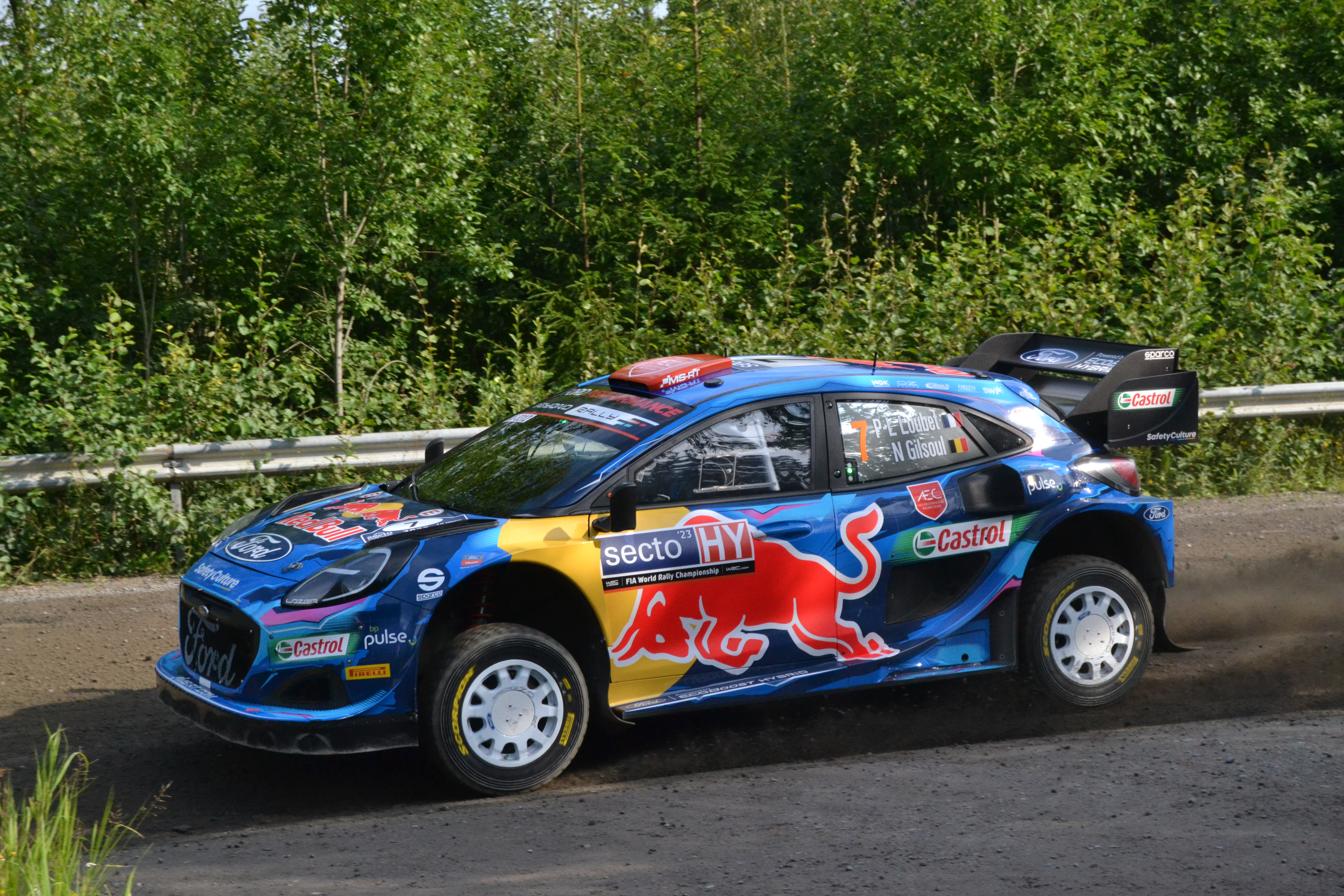
- Rally Finland has the fastest average speed of any event on the calendar.
- Host country: Finland
- Rally base: Jyväskylä, Central Finland
- Dates run: 3 – 6 August 2023
- Start location: Jyväskylä, Central Finland
- Finish location: Himos, Jämsä
- Stages: 22 (320.56 km; 199.19 miles)
- Stage surface: Gravel
- Transport distance: 1,151.07 km (715.24 miles)
- Overall distance: 1,471.63 km (914.43 miles)

Statistics
- Crews registered: 68
- Crews: 65 at start, 49 at finish

Overall results
- Overall winner: (United Kingdom) Elfyn Evans (United Kingdom) Scott Martin (Japan) Toyota Gazoo Racing WRT; 2:33:11.3
- Power Stage winner: (United Kingdom) Elfyn Evans (United Kingdom) Scott Martin (Japan) Toyota Gazoo Racing WRT; 4:54.1

Support category results
- WRC-2 winner: (Finland) Sami Pajari (Finland) Enni Mälkönen (Germany) Toksport WRT 2; 2:43:15.0
- WRC-3 winner: (Finland) Benjamin Korhola (Finland) Pekka Kelander (Finland) Rautio Motorsport; 2:54:27.0

The 2023 Rally Finland (also known as the Secto Rally Finland 2023) was a motor racing event for rally cars that was held from 3 August to 6 August 2023. It marked the seventy-second running of the Rally Finland, and was the ninth round of the 2023 World Rally Championship, World Rally Championship-2 and World Rally Championship-3. The event was based in Jyväskylä in Central Finland, and was contested over twenty-two special stages covering a total competitive distance of 320.56 km (199.19 mi).

Ott Tänak and Martin Järveoja were the defending rally winners. The team they drove for in 2022, Hyundai Shell Mobis WRT, were the defending manufacturers' winners. Emil Lindholm and Reeta Hämäläinen were the defending rally winners in the WRC-2 category. Lauri Joona and Tuukka Shemeikka were the defending rally winners in the WRC-3 category.

Elfyn Evans and Scott Martin won their second rally of the season. Their team, Toyota Gazoo Racing WRT, were the manufacturer's winners. Sami Pajari and Enni Mälkönen won the World Rally Championship-2 category. Benjamin Korhola and Pekka Kelander won the World Rally Championship-3 category.

== Background ==
=== Entry list ===
The following crews entered into the rally. The event was opened to crews competing in the World Rally Championship, its support categories, the World Rally Championship-2, World Rally Championship-3 and privateer entries that were not registered to score points in any championship. Nine entered under Rally1 regulations, as were twenty-eight Rally2 crews in the World Rally Championship-2 and thirteen Rally3 crews in the World Rally Championship-3.

Rally1 entries competing in the World Rally Championship
No.	Driver	Co-Driver	Entrant	Car	Championship eligibility	Tyre
3	(Finland) Teemu Suninen	(Finland) Mikko Markkula	(South Korea) Hyundai Shell Mobis WRT	Hyundai i20 N Rally1	Driver, Co-driver, Manufacturer	P
4	(Finland) Esapekka Lappi	(Finland) Janne Ferm	(South Korea) Hyundai Shell Mobis WRT	Hyundai i20 N Rally1	Driver, Co-driver, Manufacturer	P
7	(France) Pierre-Louis Loubet	(Belgium) Nicolas Gilsoul	(United Kingdom) M-Sport Ford WRT	Ford Puma Rally1	Driver, Co-driver, Manufacturer	P
8	(Estonia) Ott Tänak	(Estonia) Martin Järveoja	(United Kingdom) M-Sport Ford WRT	Ford Puma Rally1	Driver, Co-driver, Manufacturer	P
11	(Belgium) Thierry Neuville	(Belgium) Martijn Wydaeghe	(South Korea) Hyundai Shell Mobis WRT	Hyundai i20 N Rally1	Driver, Co-driver, Manufacturer	P
18	(Japan) Takamoto Katsuta	(Republic of Ireland) Aaron Johnston	(Japan) Toyota Gazoo Racing WRT	Toyota GR Yaris Rally1	Driver, Co-driver, Manufacturer	P
33	(United Kingdom) Elfyn Evans	(United Kingdom) Scott Martin	(Japan) Toyota Gazoo Racing WRT	Toyota GR Yaris Rally1	Driver, Co-driver, Manufacturer	P
69	(Finland) Kalle Rovanperä	(Finland) Jonne Halttunen	(Japan) Toyota Gazoo Racing WRT	Toyota GR Yaris Rally1	Driver, Co-driver, Manufacturer	P
97	(Finland) Jari-Matti Latvala	(Finland) Juho Hänninen	(Japan) Toyota Gazoo Racing WRT	Toyota GR Yaris Rally1	Driver, Co-driver	P

Rally2 entries competing in the World Rally Championship-2
No.	Driver	Co-Driver	Entrant	Car	Championship eligibility	Tyre
22	(United Kingdom) Gus Greensmith	(Sweden) Jonas Andersson	(Germany) Toksport WRT 3	Škoda Fabia RS Rally2	Driver, Co-driver, Team	P
23	(Finland) Emil Lindholm	(Finland) Reeta Hämäläinen	(South Korea) Hyundai Motorsport N	Hyundai i20 N Rally2	Driver, Co-driver, Team	P
24	(Norway) Andreas Mikkelsen	(Norway) Torstein Eriksen	(Germany) Toksport WRT 3	Škoda Fabia RS Rally2	Driver, Co-driver, Team	P
25	Nikolay Gryazin (Note: Nikolay Gryazin is Russian, but he competes as a neutral competitor using the ANA flag as Russian national emblems were banned by the association due to the Russian invasion of Ukraine.)	Konstantin Aleksandrov (Note: Konstantin Aleksandrov is Russian, but he competes as a neutral competitor using the ANA flag as Russian national emblems were banned by the association due to the Russian invasion of Ukraine.)	(Germany) Toksport WRT 2	Škoda Fabia RS Rally2	Challenger Driver, Challenger Co-driver, Team	P
26	(France) Adrien Fourmaux	(France) Alexandre Coria	(United Kingdom) M-Sport Ford WRT	Ford Fiesta Rally2	Driver, Co-driver, Team	P
27	(Finland) Sami Pajari	(Finland) Enni Mälkönen	(Germany) Toksport WRT 2	Škoda Fabia RS Rally2	Challenger Driver, Challenger Co-Driver, Team	P
28	(Finland) Jari Huttunen	(Finland) Antti Haapala	(Finland) Jari Huttunen	Škoda Fabia RS Rally2	Driver, Co-driver	P
29	(Finland) Lauri Joona	(Finland) Tuukka Shemeikka	(Finland) Lauri Joona	Škoda Fabia RS Rally2	Challenger Driver, Challenger Co-driver	P
30	(Finland) Mikko Heikkilä	(Finland) Samu Vaaleri	(Finland) Mikko Heikkilä	Škoda Fabia RS Rally2	Challenger Driver, Challenger Co-driver	P
31	(Estonia) Robert Virves	(United Kingdom) Craig Drew	(Estonia) Robert Virves	Ford Fiesta Rally2	Challenger Driver, Challenger Co-driver	P
32	(Bolivia) Marco Bulacia	(Spain) Diego Vallejo	(Germany) Toksport WRT	Škoda Fabia RS Rally2	Challenger Driver, Challenger Co-driver	P
34	(Estonia) Georg Linnamäe	(United Kingdom) James Morgan	(Estonia) Georg Linnamäe	Hyundai i20 N Rally2	Challenger Driver, Challenger Co-driver	P
35	(Paraguay) Fabrizio Zaldivar	(Argentina) Marcelo Der Ohannesian	(South Korea) Hyundai Motorsport N	Hyundai i20 N Rally2	Challenger Driver, Challenger Co-driver, Team	P
36	(Poland) Mikołaj Marczyk	(Poland) Szymon Gospodarczyk	(Poland) Mikołaj Marczyk	Škoda Fabia RS Rally2	Challenger Driver, Challenger Co-driver	P
37	(Bolivia) Bruno Bulacia	(Spain) Axel Coronado	(Bolivia) Bruno Bulacia	Škoda Fabia RS Rally2	Challenger Driver, Challenger Co-driver	P
38	(Chile) Emilio Fernández	(Spain) Borja Odriozola	(Chile) Emilio Fernández	Škoda Fabia Rally2 evo	Challenger Driver, Challenger Co-driver	P
39	(Republic of Ireland) Josh McErlean	(Republic of Ireland) James Fulton	(Republic of Ireland) Motorsport Ireland Rally Academy	Hyundai i20 N Rally2	Challenger Driver, Challenger Co-driver, Team	P
40	(Luxembourg) Grégoire Munster	(Belgium) Louis Louka	(United Kingdom) M-Sport Ford WRT	Ford Fiesta Rally2	Challenger Driver, Challenger Co-driver, Team	P
41	(Finland) Riku Tahko	(Finland) Markus Soininen	(Finland) Riku Tahko	Hyundai i20 N Rally2	Challenger Driver, Challenger Co-driver	P
44	(France) Nicolas Ciamin	(France) Yannick Roche	(France) Nicolas Ciamin	Volkswagen Polo GTI R5	Challenger Driver, Challenger Co-driver	P
45	(Finland) Tommi Jylhä	(Finland) Kimmo Nevanpää	(Finland) Tommi Jylhä	Škoda Fabia R5	Challenger Driver, Challenger Co-driver	P
46	(Spain) Alexander Villanueva	(Spain) José Murado González	(Spain) Alexander Villanueva	Škoda Fabia RS Rally2	Challenger/Masters Driver, Challenger Co-driver	P
47	(Italy) Mauro Miele	(Italy) Luca Beltrame	(Italy) Mauro Miele	Škoda Fabia RS Rally2	Challenger/Masters Driver, Challenger Co-driver	—N/a
48	(Republic of Ireland) Eamonn Kelly	(Republic of Ireland) Conor Mohan	(Republic of Ireland) Motorsport Ireland Rally Academy	Hyundai i20 N Rally2	Challenger Driver, Challenger Co-driver, Team	P
49	(Spain) Miguel Díaz-Aboitiz	(Spain) Rodrigo Sanjuan de Eusebio	(Spain) Miguel Díaz-Aboitiz	Škoda Fabia Rally2 evo	Challenger/Masters Driver, Challenger Co-driver	P
50	(Italy) Luciano Cobbe	(Italy) Roberto Mometti	(Italy) Luciano Cobbe	Škoda Fabia Rally2 evo	Challenger/Masters Driver, Challenger/Masters Co-driver	P
51	(Qatar) Nasser Khalifa Al-Attiyah	(Italy) Giovanni Bernacchini	(Qatar) Nasser Khalifa Al-Attiyah	Ford Fiesta Rally2	Challenger/Masters Driver, Challenger Co-driver	—N/a
52	(Finland) Roope Korhonen	(Finland) Anssi Viinikka	(Finland) Roope Korhonen	Volkswagen Polo GTI R5	Challenger Driver, Challenger Co-driver	P
65	(Finland) Anssi Rytkönen	(Finland) Juho-Ville Koskela	(Finland) Anssi Rytkönen	Škoda Fabia R5	Challenger Driver, Challenger Co-driver	P

Rally3 entries competing in the World Rally Championship-3
No.	Driver	Co-Driver	Entrant	Car	Tyre
53	(Finland) Benjamin Korhola	(Finland) Pekka Kelander	(Finland) Rautio Motorsport	Ford Fiesta Rally3	P
54	(Finland) Toni Herranen	(Finland) Mikko Lukka	(Finland) Toni Herranen	Ford Fiesta Rally3	P
55	(Turkey) Ali Türkkan	(Turkey) Burak Erdener	(Turkey) Castrol Ford Team Türkiye	Ford Fiesta Rally3	P
56	(Czech Republic) Filip Kohn	(United Kingdom) Tom Woodburn	(Czech Republic) Filip Kohn	Ford Fiesta Rally3	P
57	(Finland) Jesse Kallio	(Finland) Jussi Lindberg	(Finland) Jesse Kallio	Ford Fiesta Rally3	P
58	(Finland) Kristian Nieminen	(Finland) Valtteri Nieminen	(Finland) Kristian Nieminen	Ford Fiesta Rally3	P
59	(Finland) Henri Timonen	(Finland) Jussi Kärpijoki	(Finland) Henri Timonen	Ford Fiesta Rally3	P
60	(Republic of Ireland) Brendan Cumiskey	(Republic of Ireland) Martin Connolly	(Republic of Ireland) Brendan Cumiskey	Ford Fiesta Rally3	P
61	(Finland) Ville Laakso	(Finland) Jani Luhtaniemi	(Finland) Ville Laakso	Ford Fiesta Rally3	P
62	(Finland) Tuomas Vihtari	(Finland) Ville Harvia	(Finland) Tuomas Vihtari	Ford Fiesta Rally3	P
63	(Poland) Marek Paciorkowski	(Poland) Kamil Heller	(Poland) Marek Paciorkowski	Ford Fiesta Rally3	P
64	(Kazakhstan) Petr Borodin	(Kazakhstan) Roman Cheprassov	(Kazakhstan) Petr Borodin	Ford Fiesta Rally3	P

Other major entries
No.	Driver	Co-Driver	Entrant	Car	Tyre
20	(France) Yohan Rossel	(France) Arnaud Dunand	(France) PH Sport	Citroën C3 Rally2	P
21	(Sweden) Oliver Solberg	(United Kingdom) Elliott Edmondson	(Sweden) Oliver Solberg	Škoda Fabia RS Rally2	P

=== Itinerary ===
All dates and times are EEST (UTC+3).

Date	No.	Time span	Stage name	Distance
3 August	—	After 9:01	Rannankylä [Shakedown]	4.48 km
3 August		After 18:42	Opening ceremony, Jyväskylä Paviljonki	—N/a
3 August	SS1	After 19:05	Harju 1	3.48 km
3 August		19:40 – 19:55	Flexi service A, Jyväskylä Paviljonki	—N/a
4 August	SS2	After 8:05	Laukaa 1	11.78 km
4 August	SS3	After 9:03	Lankamaa 1	14.21 km
4 August	SS4	After 10:21	Myhinpää 1	15.51 km
4 August	SS5	After 11:35	Halttula 1	9.14 km
4 August		12:20 – 13:02	Regroup, Jyväskylä Paviljonki	—N/a
4 August		13:02 – 13:42	Service B, Jyväskylä Paviljonki	—N/a
4 August	SS6	After 14:32	Laukaa 2	11.78 km
4 August	SS7	After 15:30	Lankamaa 2	14.21 km
4 August	SS8	After 16:48	Myhinpää 2	15.51 km
4 August	SS9	After 18:05	Halttula 2	9.14 km
4 August	SS10	After 20:05	Harju 2	3.48 km
4 August		20:40 – 21:25	Flexi service C, Jyväskylä Paviljonki	—N/a
5 August	SS11	After 8:05	Västilä 1	18.94 km
5 August	SS12	After 9:05	Päijälä 1	20.19 km
5 August	SS13	After 10:05	Rapsula 1	20.56 km
5 August	SS14	After 11:05	Vekkula 1	20.65 km
5 August		12:35 – 13:17	Regroup, Jyväskylä Paviljonki	—N/a
5 August		13:17 – 13:57	Service D, Jyväskylä Paviljonki	—N/a
5 August	SS15	After 15:35	Västilä 2	18.94 km
5 August	SS16	After 16:35	Päijälä 2	20.19 km
5 August	SS17	After 17:32	Rapsula 2	20.56 km
5 August	SS18	After 18:35	Vekkula 2	20.65 km
5 August		20:15 – 21:00	Flexi service E, Jyväskylä Paviljonki	—N/a
6 August	SS19	After 7:53	Moksi-Sahloinen 1	16.56 km
6 August	SS20	After 9:05	Himos-Jämsä 1	9.26 km
6 August	SS21	After 10:30	Moksi-Sahloinen 2	16.56 km
6 August		11:42 – 12:43	Regroup, Himos	—N/a
6 August		12:43 – 12:58	Tyre fitting zone, Himos	—N/a
6 August	SS22	After 13:15	Himos-Jämsä 2 [Power Stage]	9.26 km
6 August		After 14:15	Podium ceremony, Himos	—N/a

== Report ==
=== WRC Rally1 ===
==== Classification ====
Position		No.	Driver	Co-driver	Entrant	Car	Time	Difference	Points	
Event	Class	No.	Driver	Co-driver	Entrant	Car	Time	Difference	Event	Stage
1	1	33	Elfyn Evans	Scott Martin	Toyota Gazoo Racing WRT	Toyota GR Yaris Rally1	2:33:11.3	0.0	25	5
2	2	11	Thierry Neuville	Martijn Wydaeghe	Hyundai Shell Mobis WRT	Hyundai i20 N Rally1	2:33:50.4	+39.1	18	4
3	3	18	Takamoto Katsuta	Aaron Johnston	Toyota Gazoo Racing WRT	Toyota GR Yaris Rally1	2:34:48.0	+1:36.7	15	2
4	4	3	Teemu Suninen	Mikko Markkula	Hyundai Shell Mobis WRT	Hyundai i20 N Rally1	2:34:52.3	+1:41.0	12	3
5	5	97	Jari-Matti Latvala	Juho Hänninen	Toyota Gazoo Racing WRT	Toyota GR Yaris Rally1	2:37:20.7	+4:09.4	10	1
45	6	7	Pierre-Louis Loubet	Nicolas Gilsoul	M-Sport Ford WRT	Ford Puma Rally1	3:59:08.1	+1:25:58.8	0	0
Retired SS8		69	Kalle Rovanperä	Jonne Halttunen	Toyota Gazoo Racing WRT	Toyota GR Yaris Rally1	Rolled		0	0
Retired SS5		4	Esapekka Lappi	Janne Ferm	Hyundai Shell Mobis WRT	Hyundai i20 N Rally1	Accident		0	0
Retired SS3		8	Ott Tänak	Martin Järveoja	M-Sport Ford WRT	Ford Puma Rally1	Engine		0	0

==== Special stages ====
Stage	Winners	Car	Time	Class leaders
SD	Rovanperä / Halttunen	Toyota GR Yaris Rally1	1:56.3	—N/a
SS1	Tänak / Järveoja	Ford Puma Rally1	2:39.0	Tänak / Järveoja
SS2	Katsuta / Johnston	Toyota GR Yaris Rally1	5:36.1	Rovanperä / Halttunen
SS3	Rovanperä / Halttunen	Toyota GR Yaris Rally1	5:57.8	Rovanperä / Halttunen
SS4	Rovanperä / Halttunen	Toyota GR Yaris Rally1	6:55.7	Rovanperä / Halttunen
SS5	Rovanperä / Halttunen	Toyota GR Yaris Rally1	4:21.0	Rovanperä / Halttunen
SS6	Rovanperä / Halttunen	Toyota GR Yaris Rally1	5:40.5	Rovanperä / Halttunen
SS7	Rovanperä / Halttunen	Toyota GR Yaris Rally1	6:05.7	Rovanperä / Halttunen
SS8	Neuville / Wydaeghe	Hyundai i20 N Rally1	6:59.6	Evans / Martin
SS9	Neuville / Wydaeghe	Hyundai i20 N Rally1	4:20.7	Evans / Martin
SS10	Neuville / Wydaeghe	Hyundai i20 N Rally1	2:44.5	Evans / Martin
SS11	Evans / Martin	Toyota GR Yaris Rally1	8:29.5	Evans / Martin
SS12	Evans / Martin	Toyota GR Yaris Rally1	9:39.0	Evans / Martin
SS13	Evans / Martin	Toyota GR Yaris Rally1	9:55.2	Evans / Martin
SS14	Evans / Martin	Toyota GR Yaris Rally1	10:09.4	Evans / Martin
SS15	Evans / Martin	Toyota GR Yaris Rally1	8:23.4	Evans / Martin
SS16	Evans / Martin	Toyota GR Yaris Rally1	9:32.0	Evans / Martin
SS17	Evans / Martin	Toyota GR Yaris Rally1	9:49.0	Evans / Martin
SS18	Katsuta / Johnston	Toyota GR Yaris Rally1	10:32.8	Evans / Martin
SS19	Evans / Martin	Toyota GR Yaris Rally1	7:34.9	Evans / Martin
SS20	Katsuta / Johnston	Toyota GR Yaris Rally1	5:04.4	Evans / Martin
SS21	Evans / Martin	Toyota GR Yaris Rally1	7:26.7	Evans / Martin
SS22	Evans / Martin	Toyota GR Yaris Rally1	4:54.1	Evans / Martin

==== Championship standings ====
Pos.	Drivers' championships			Co-drivers' championships			Manufacturers' championships		
Pos.	Move	Driver	Points	Move	Co-driver	Points	Move	Manufacturer	Points
1		Kalle Rovanperä	170		Jonne Halttunen	170		Toyota Gazoo Racing WRT	378
2		Elfyn Evans	145		Scott Martin	145		Hyundai Shell Mobis WRT	311
3		Thierry Neuville	134		Martijn Wydaeghe	134		M-Sport Ford WRT	205
4		Ott Tänak	104		Martin Järveoja	104			
5		Sébastien Ogier	98		Vincent Landais	98			

=== WRC-2 Rally2 ===
==== Classification ====
Position		No.	Driver	Co-driver	Entrant	Car	Time	Difference	Points		
Event	Class	No.	Driver	Co-driver	Entrant	Car	Time	Difference	Class	Stage	Event
7	1	27	Sami Pajari	Enni Mälkönen	Toksport WRT 2	Škoda Fabia RS Rally2	2:43:15.0	0.0	25	0	6
8	2	26	Adrien Fourmaux	Alexandre Coria	M-Sport Ford WRT	Ford Fiesta Rally2	2:43:48.8	+33.8	18	0	4
9	3	25	Nikolay Gryazin	Konstantin Aleksandrov	Toksport WRT 2	Škoda Fabia RS Rally2	2:44:22.8	+1:07.8	15	2	2
10	4	24	Andreas Mikkelsen	Torstein Eriksen	Toksport WRT 3	Škoda Fabia RS Rally2	2:44:46.5	+1:31.5	12	1	1
11	5	30	Mikko Heikkilä	Samu Vaaleri	Mikko Heikkilä	Škoda Fabia RS Rally2	2:45:15.6	+2:00.6	10	0	0
12	6	34	Georg Linnamäe	James Morgan	Georg Linnamäe	Hyundai i20 N Rally2	2:45:32.2	+2:17.2	8	0	0
13	7	36	Mikołaj Marczyk	Szymon Gospodarczyk	Mikołaj Marczyk	Škoda Fabia RS Rally2	2:45:59.0	+2:44.0	6	0	0
14	8	29	Lauri Joona	Tuukka Shemeikka	Lauri Joona	Škoda Fabia RS Rally2	2:45:59.4	+2:44.4	4	0	0
15	9	40	Grégoire Munster	Louis Louka	M-Sport Ford WRT	Ford Fiesta Rally2	2:47:48.5	+4:33.5	2	0	0
16	10	44	Nicolas Ciamin	Yannick Roche	Nicolas Ciamin	Volkswagen Polo GTI R5	2:49:50.3	+6:35.3	1	0	0
18	11	38	Emilio Fernández	Borja Odriozola	Emilio Fernández	Škoda Fabia Rally2 evo	2:50:52.6	+7:37.6	0	0	0
19	12	39	Josh McErlean	James Fulton	Motorsport Ireland Rally Academy	Hyundai i20 N Rally2	2:52:55.3	+9:40.3	0	0	0
20	13	23	Emil Lindholm	Reeta Hämäläinen	Hyundai Motorsport N	Hyundai i20 N Rally2	2:53:34.6	+10:19.6	0	3	0
23	14	48	Eamonn Kelly	Conor Mohan	Motorsport Ireland Rally Academy	Hyundai i20 N Rally2	2:55:27.2	+12:12.2	0	0	0
24	15	65	Anssi Rytkönen	Juho-Ville Koskela	Anssi Rytkönen	Škoda Fabia R5	2:58:11.1	+14:56.1	0	0	0
26	16	46	Alexander Villanueva	José Murado González	Alexander Villanueva	Škoda Fabia RS Rally2	3:01:10.3	+17:55.3	0	0	0
31	17	45	Tommi Jylhä	Kimmo Nevanpää	Tommi Jylhä	Škoda Fabia R5	3:14:09.1	+30:54.1	0	0	0
39	18	49	Miguel Díaz-Aboitiz	Rodrigo Sanjuan de Eusebio	Miguel Díaz-Aboitiz	Škoda Fabia Rally2 evo	3:24:11.4	+40:56.4	0	0	0
42	19	52	Roope Korhonen	Anssi Viinikka	Roope Korhonen	Volkswagen Polo GTI R5	3:34:28.4	+51:13.4	0	0	0
Retired SS20		37	Bruno Bulacia	Axel Coronado	Bruno Bulacia	Škoda Fabia RS Rally2	Accident		0	0	0
Retired SS16		22	Gus Greensmith	Jonas Andersson	Toksport WRT 3	Škoda Fabia RS Rally2	Rolled		0	0	0
Retired SS16		35	Fabrizio Zaldivar	Marcelo Der Ohannesian	Hyundai Motorsport N	Hyundai i20 N Rally2	Withdrawn		0	0	0
Retired SS15		28	Jari Huttunen	Antti Haapala	Jari Huttunen	Škoda Fabia RS Rally2	Engine		0	0	0
Retired SS15		41	Riku Tahko	Markus Soininen	Riku Tahko	Hyundai i20 N Rally2	Accident		0	0	0
Retired SS12		32	Marco Bulacia	Diego Vallejo	Toksport WRT	Škoda Fabia RS Rally2	Accident		0	0	0
Retired SS2		31	Robert Virves	Craig Drew	Robert Virves	Ford Fiesta Rally2	Accident		0	0	0
Retired SS1		50	Luciano Cobbe	Roberto Mometti	Luciano Cobbe	Škoda Fabia Rally2 evo	Medical		0	0	0
Did not start		47	Mauro Miele	Luca Beltrame	Mauro Miele	Škoda Fabia RS Rally2	Withdrawn		0	0	0
Did not start		51	Nasser Khalifa Al-Attiyah	Giovanni Bernacchini	Nasser Khalifa Al-Attiyah	Ford Fiesta Rally2	Withdrawn		0	0	0

==== Special stages ====
Overall
Stage	Winners	Car	Time	Class leaders
SD	Marczyk / Gospodarczyk	Škoda Fabia RS Rally2	2:06.4	—N/a
SS1	Huttunen / Haapala	Škoda Fabia RS Rally2	2:47.3	Huttunen / Haapala
SS2	Pajari / Mälkonen	Škoda Fabia RS Rally2	5:56.9	Pajari / Mälkonen
SS3	Huttunen / Haapala	Škoda Fabia RS Rally2	6:28.5	Pajari / Mälkonen
SS4	Pajari / Mälkonen	Škoda Fabia RS Rally2	7:24.0	Pajari / Mälkonen
SS5	Mikkelsen / Eriksen	Škoda Fabia RS Rally2	4:41.7	Pajari / Mälkonen
SS6	Pajari / Mälkonen	Škoda Fabia RS Rally2	5:56.7	Pajari / Mälkonen
SS7	Huttunen / Haapala	Škoda Fabia RS Rally2	6:27.1	Pajari / Mälkonen
SS8	Pajari / Mälkonen	Škoda Fabia RS Rally2	7:23.1	Pajari / Mälkonen
SS9	Heikkilä / Vaaleri	Škoda Fabia RS Rally2	4:38.8	Huttunen / Haapala
SS10	Fourmaux / Coria	Ford Fiesta Rally2	2:53.9	Huttunen / Haapala
SS11	Pajari / Mälkonen	Škoda Fabia RS Rally2	9:00.3	Huttunen / Haapala
SS12	Huttunen / Haapala	Škoda Fabia RS Rally2	10:14.0	Huttunen / Haapala
SS13	Greensmith / Andersson; Pajari / Mälkonen	Škoda Fabia RS Rally2; Škoda Fabia RS Rally2	10:33.4	Huttunen / Haapala
SS14	Pajari / Mälkonen	Škoda Fabia RS Rally2	10:46.0	Huttunen / Haapala
SS15	Pajari / Mälkonen	Škoda Fabia RS Rally2	8:52.8	Pajari / Mälkonen
SS16	Mikkelsen / Eriksen	Škoda Fabia RS Rally2	10:07.9	Pajari / Mälkonen
SS17	Pajari / Mälkonen	Škoda Fabia RS Rally2	10:24.1	Pajari / Mälkonen
SS18	Fourmaux / Coria	Ford Fiesta Rally2	11:15.6	Pajari / Mälkonen
SS19	Lindholm / Hämäläinen	Hyundai i20 N Rally2	8:02.8	Pajari / Mälkonen
SS20	Gryazin / Aleksandrov	Škoda Fabia RS Rally2	5:19.3	Pajari / Mälkonen
SS21	Lindholm / Hämäläinen	Hyundai i20 N Rally2	7:51.8	Pajari / Mälkonen
SS22	Lindholm / Hämäläinen	Hyundai i20 N Rally2	5:13.1	Pajari / Mälkonen

Challenger
Stage	Winners	Car	Time	Class leaders
SD	Marczyk / Gospodarczyk	Škoda Fabia RS Rally2	2:06.4	—N/a
SS1	Gryazin / Aleksandrov	Škoda Fabia RS Rally2	2:48.4	Gryazin / Aleksandrov
SS2	Pajari / Mälkonen	Škoda Fabia RS Rally2	5:56.9	Pajari / Mälkonen
SS3	Pajari / Mälkonen	Škoda Fabia RS Rally2	6:29.5	Pajari / Mälkonen
SS4	Pajari / Mälkonen	Škoda Fabia RS Rally2	7:24.0	Pajari / Mälkonen
SS5	Linnamäe / Morgan	Hyundai i20 N Rally2	4:42.2	Pajari / Mälkonen
SS6	Pajari / Mälkonen	Škoda Fabia RS Rally2	5:56.7	Pajari / Mälkonen
SS7	Pajari / Mälkonen	Škoda Fabia RS Rally2	6:28.0	Pajari / Mälkonen
SS8	Pajari / Mälkonen	Škoda Fabia RS Rally2	7:23.1	Pajari / Mälkonen
SS9	Heikkilä / Vaaleri	Škoda Fabia RS Rally2	4:38.8	Pajari / Mälkonen
SS10	Gryazin / Aleksandrov	Škoda Fabia RS Rally2	2:55.4	Pajari / Mälkonen
SS11	Pajari / Mälkonen	Škoda Fabia RS Rally2	9:00.3	Pajari / Mälkonen
SS12	Pajari / Mälkonen	Škoda Fabia RS Rally2	10:17.1	Pajari / Mälkonen
SS13	Pajari / Mälkonen	Škoda Fabia RS Rally2	10:33.4	Pajari / Mälkonen
SS14	Pajari / Mälkonen	Škoda Fabia RS Rally2	10:46.0	Pajari / Mälkonen
SS15	Pajari / Mälkonen	Škoda Fabia RS Rally2	8:52.8	Pajari / Mälkonen
SS16	Pajari / Mälkonen	Škoda Fabia RS Rally2	10:12.0	Pajari / Mälkonen
SS17	Pajari / Mälkonen	Škoda Fabia RS Rally2	10:24.1	Pajari / Mälkonen
SS18	Pajari / Mälkonen	Škoda Fabia RS Rally2	11:17.4	Pajari / Mälkonen
SS19	Korhonen / Viinikka	Volkswagen Polo GTI R5	8:03.1	Pajari / Mälkonen
SS20	Gryazin / Aleksandrov	Škoda Fabia RS Rally2	5:19.3	Pajari / Mälkonen
SS21	Gryazin / Aleksandrov	Škoda Fabia RS Rally2	7:53.8	Pajari / Mälkonen
SS22	Gryazin / Aleksandrov	Škoda Fabia RS Rally2	5:14.2	Pajari / Mälkonen

==== Championship standings ====
Pos.	Open Drivers' championships			Open Co-drivers' championships			Teams' championships			Challenger Drivers' championships			Challenger Co-drivers' championships		
Pos.	Move	Driver	Points	Move	Co-driver	Points	Move	Manufacturer	Points	Move	Manufacturer	Points	Move	Driver	Points
1	1	Andreas Mikkelsen	82		Torstein Eriksen	101	3	M-Sport Ford WRT	119	1	Sami Pajari	93	1	Enni Mälkönen	93
2	1	Yohan Rossel	77		Arnaud Dunand	77	1	Toksport WRT	110	1	Kajetan Kajetanowicz	75	1	Maciej Szczepaniak	75
3	4	Sami Pajari	71	4	Jonas Andersson	71		Toksport WRT 3	105	1	Nikolay Gryazin	68	1	Konstantin Aleksandrov	68
4	1	Oliver Solberg	64	1	Elliott Edmondson	64	1	Toksport WRT 2	105	1	Marco Bulacia	68	1	Diego Vallejo	58
5	1	Gus Greensmith	62	1	Jonas Andersson	62	3	Hyundai Motorsport N	104		Mikołaj Marczyk	55		Szymon Gospodarczyk	55

=== WRC-3 Rally3 ===
==== Classification ====
Position		No.	Driver	Co-driver	Entrant	Car	Time	Difference	Points
Event	Class	No.	Driver	Co-driver	Entrant	Car	Time	Difference	Points
21	1	53	Benjamin Korhola	Pekka Kelander	Rautio Motorsport	Ford Fiesta Rally3	2:54:27.0	0.0	25
22	2	57	Jesse Kallio	Jussi Lindberg	Jesse Kallio	Ford Fiesta Rally3	2:55:02.6	+35.6	18
25	3	56	Filip Kohn	Tom Woodburn	Filip Kohn	Ford Fiesta Rally3	2:59:39.6	+5:12.6	15
29	4	59	Henri Timonen	Jussi Kärpijoki	Henri Timonen	Ford Fiesta Rally3	3:08:42.1	+14:15.1	12
33	5	62	Tuomas Vihtari	Ville Harvia	Tuomas Vihtari	Ford Fiesta Rally3	3:15:20.2	+20:53.2	10
35	6	60	Brendan Cumiskey	Martin Connolly	Brendan Cumiskey	Ford Fiesta Rally3	3:16:44.9	+22:17.9	8
36	7	61	Ville Laakso	Jani Luhtaniemi	Ville Laakso	Ford Fiesta Rally3	3:17:43.2	+23:16.2	6
48	8	64	Petr Borodin	Roman Cheprassov	Petr Borodin	Ford Fiesta Rally3	4:53:42.5	+1:59:15.5	4
Retired SS21		55	Ali Türkkan	Burak Erdener	Castrol Ford Team Türkiye	Ford Fiesta Rally3	Off Road		0
Retired SS13		63	Marek Paciorkowski	Kamil Heller	Marek Paciorkowski	Ford Fiesta Rally3	Withdrawn		0
Retired SS4		58	Kristian Nieminen	Valtteri Nieminen	Kristian Nieminen	Ford Fiesta Rally3	Accident		0
Did not start		54	Toni Herranen	Mikko Lukka	Toni Herranen	Ford Fiesta Rally3	Withdrawn		0

==== Special stages ====
Stage	Winners	Car	Time	Class leaders
SD	Türkkan / Erdener	Ford Fiesta Rally3	2:15.1	—N/a
SS1	Kohn / Woodburn	Ford Fiesta Rally3	3:01.5	Kohn / Woodburn
SS2	Korhola / Kelander	Ford Fiesta Rally3	6:16.9	Korhola / Kelander
SS3	Kallio / Lindberg	Ford Fiesta Rally3	6:56.9	Korhola / Kelander
SS4	Korhola / Kelander	Ford Fiesta Rally3	7:49.8	Korhola / Kelander
SS5	Korhola / Kelander	Ford Fiesta Rally3	4:54.6	Korhola / Kelander
SS6	Korhola / Kelander	Ford Fiesta Rally3	6:25.3	Korhola / Kelander
SS7	Korhola / Kelander	Ford Fiesta Rally3	6:59.7	Korhola / Kelander
SS8	Korhola / Kelander	Ford Fiesta Rally3	7:56.5	Korhola / Kelander
SS9	Korhola / Kelander	Ford Fiesta Rally3	4:59.2	Korhola / Kelander
SS10	Kohn / Woodburn	Ford Fiesta Rally3	3:05.8	Korhola / Kelander
SS11	Kallio / Lindberg	Ford Fiesta Rally3	9:39.1	Korhola / Kelander
SS12	Korhola / Kelander	Ford Fiesta Rally3	11:05.4	Korhola / Kelander
SS13	Korhola / Kelander	Ford Fiesta Rally3	11:15.3	Korhola / Kelander
SS14	Kallio / Lindberg	Ford Fiesta Rally3	11:30.1	Korhola / Kelander
SS15	Kallio / Lindberg	Ford Fiesta Rally3	9:34.9	Korhola / Kelander
SS16	Korhola / Kelander	Ford Fiesta Rally3	11:01.3	Korhola / Kelander
SS17	Korhola / Kelander	Ford Fiesta Rally3	11:09.8	Korhola / Kelander
SS18	Korhola / Kelander	Ford Fiesta Rally3	11:56.2	Korhola / Kelander
SS19	Kallio / Lindberg	Ford Fiesta Rally3	8:34.6	Korhola / Kelander
SS20	Korhola / Kelander	Ford Fiesta Rally3	5:41.5	Korhola / Kelander
SS21	Kallio / Lindberg	Ford Fiesta Rally3	8:29.9	Korhola / Kelander
SS22	Kallio / Lindberg	Ford Fiesta Rally3	5:40.2	Korhola / Kelander

==== Championship standings ====
Pos.	Drivers' championships			Co-drivers' championships		
Pos.	Move	Driver	Points	Move	Co-driver	Points
1		Roope Korhonen	100		Anssi Viinikka	100
2		Diego Dominguez Jr.	62		Rogelio Peñate	62
3		William Creighton	47		Liam Regan	47
4		Laurent Pellier	43		Loïc Dumont	40
5		Tom Rensonnet	40		Mikko Lukka	37

== Notes ==
Previous rally: 2023 Rally Estonia	2023 FIA World Rally Championship	Next rally: 2023 Acropolis Rally
Previous rally: 2022 Rally Finland	2023 Rally Finland	Next rally: 2024 Rally Finland
