= 2023 Rally de Portugal =

56th edition of Rally de Portugal

2023 Rally de Portugal Vodafone Rally de Portugal 2023
Round 5 of 13 in the 2023 World Rally Championship
← Previous event	Next event →
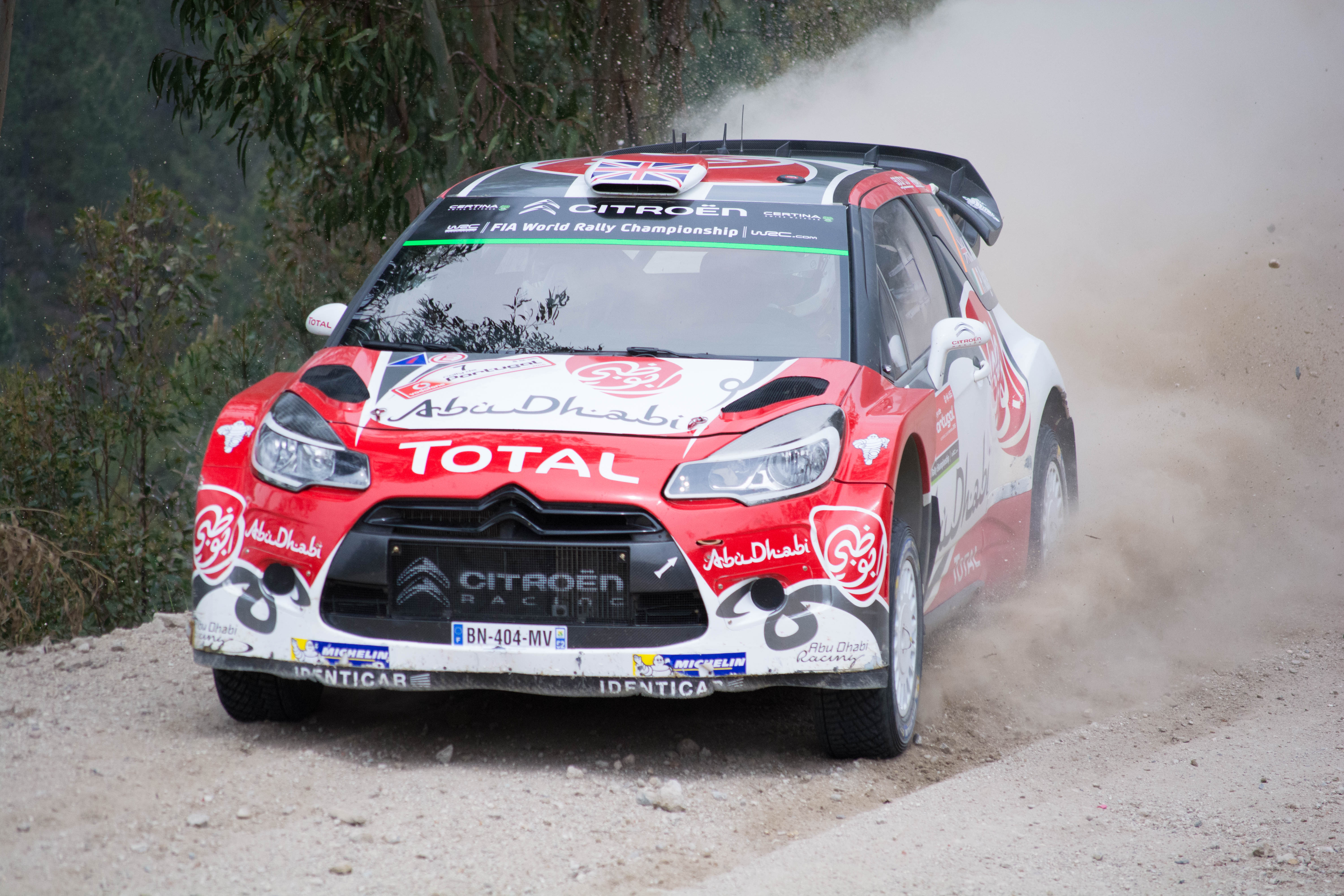
- Rocks and deep ruts are the features of the Rally de Portugal.
- Host country: Portugal
- Rally base: Matosinhos, Porto
- Dates run: 11 – 14 May 2023
- Start location: Lousã, Coimbra
- Finish location: Fafe, Braga
- Stages: 19 (329.06 km; 204.47 miles)
- Stage surface: Gravel
- Transport distance: 1,307.19 km (812.25 miles)
- Overall distance: 1,636.25 km (1,016.72 miles)

Statistics
- Crews registered: 87
- Crews: 83 at start, 47 at finish

Overall results
- Overall winner: (Finland) Kalle Rovanperä (Finland) Jonne Halttunen (Japan) Toyota Gazoo Racing WRT; 3:35:11.7
- Power Stage winner: (Finland) Kalle Rovanperä (Finland) Jonne Halttunen (Japan) Toyota Gazoo Racing WRT; 6:26.5

Support category results
- WRC-2 winner: (United Kingdom) Gus Greensmith (Sweden) Jonas Andersson (Germany) Toksport WRT 3; 3:44:55.1
- WRC-3 winner: (Finland) Roope Korhonen (Finland) Anssi Viinikka (Finland) Rautio Motorsport; 4:11:51.5

The 2023 Rally de Portugal (also known as the Vodafone Rally de Portugal 2023) was a motor racing event for rally cars held over four days between 11 and 14 May 2023. It marked the fifty-sixth running of the Rally de Portugal, and was the fifth round of the 2023 World Rally Championship, World Rally Championship-2 and World Rally Championship-3. The 2023 event was based in Matosinhos in the Porto District and was contested over nineteen special stages, covering a total competitive distance of 329.06 km (204.47 mi).

Kalle Rovanperä and Jonne Halttunen were the defending rally winners. Their team, Toyota Gazoo Racing WRT, were the defending manufacturer's winners. Yohan Rossel and Valentin Sarreaud were the defending rally winners in the WRC-2 category. Sami Pajari and Enni Mälkönen were the defending rally winners in the WRC-3 category.

Rovanperä and Halttunen successfully defended their titles, so as their team, Toyota. Gus Greensmith and Jonas Andersson won the World Rally Championship-2 category. Roope Korhonen and Anssi Viinikka won the World Rally Championship-3 category.

== Background ==
=== Entry list ===
The following crews are set to enter into the rally. The event is due to open to crews competing in the World Rally Championship, its support categories, the World Rally Championship-2, World Rally Championship-3 and privateer entries that are not registered to score points in any championship. Eight are set to enter under Rally1 regulations, as are forty-four Rally2 crews in the World Rally Championship-2 and two Rally3 crew in the World Rally Championship-3.

Rally1 entries competing in the World Rally Championship
No.	Driver	Co-Driver	Entrant	Car	Championship eligibility	Tyre
4	(Finland) Esapekka Lappi	(Finland) Janne Ferm	(South Korea) Hyundai Shell Mobis WRT	Hyundai i20 N Rally1	Driver, Co-driver, Manufacturer	P
6	(Spain) Dani Sordo	(Spain) Cándido Carrera	(South Korea) Hyundai Shell Mobis WRT	Hyundai i20 N Rally1	Driver, Co-driver, Manufacturer	P
7	(France) Pierre-Louis Loubet	(Belgium) Nicolas Gilsoul	(United Kingdom) M-Sport Ford WRT	Ford Puma Rally1	Driver, Co-driver, Manufacturer	P
8	(Estonia) Ott Tänak	(Estonia) Martin Järveoja	(United Kingdom) M-Sport Ford WRT	Ford Puma Rally1	Driver, Co-driver, Manufacturer	P
11	(Belgium) Thierry Neuville	(Belgium) Martijn Wydaeghe	(South Korea) Hyundai Shell Mobis WRT	Hyundai i20 N Rally1	Driver, Co-driver, Manufacturer	P
18	(Japan) Takamoto Katsuta	(Republic of Ireland) Aaron Johnston	(Japan) Toyota Gazoo Racing WRT	Toyota GR Yaris Rally1	Driver, Co-driver, Manufacturer	P
33	(United Kingdom) Elfyn Evans	(United Kingdom) Scott Martin	(Japan) Toyota Gazoo Racing WRT	Toyota GR Yaris Rally1	Driver, Co-driver, Manufacturer	P
69	(Finland) Kalle Rovanperä	(Finland) Jonne Halttunen	(Japan) Toyota Gazoo Racing WRT	Toyota GR Yaris Rally1	Driver, Co-driver, Manufacturer	P

Rally2 entries competing in the World Rally Championship-2
No.	Driver	Co-Driver	Entrant	Car	Championship eligibility	Tyre
20	(United Kingdom) Gus Greensmith	(Sweden) Jonas Andersson	(Germany) Toksport WRT 3	Škoda Fabia RS Rally2	Driver, Co-driver, Team	P
21	(Sweden) Oliver Solberg	(United Kingdom) Elliott Edmondson	(Sweden) Oliver Solberg	Škoda Fabia RS Rally2	Driver, Co-driver	P
23	(Finland) Teemu Suninen	(Finland) Mikko Markkula	(South Korea) Hyundai Motorsport N	Hyundai i20 N Rally2	Driver, Co-driver, Team	P
24	(Norway) Andreas Mikkelsen	(Norway) Torstein Eriksen	(Germany) Toksport WRT 3	Škoda Fabia RS Rally2	Driver, Co-driver, Team	P
25	(France) Adrien Fourmaux	(France) Alexandre Coria	(United Kingdom) M-Sport Ford WRT	Ford Fiesta Rally2	Driver, Co-driver, Team	P
26	(France) Yohan Rossel	(France) Arnaud Dunand	(France) PH Sport	Citroën C3 Rally2	Driver, Co-driver	P
27	(Paraguay) Fabrizio Zaldivar	(Italy) Marcelo Der Ohannesian	(South Korea) Hyundai Motorsport N	Hyundai i20 N Rally2	Challenger Driver, Challenger Co-driver, Team	P
28	(Luxembourg) Grégoire Munster	(Belgium) Louis Louka	(United Kingdom) M-Sport Ford WRT	Ford Fiesta Rally2	Challenger Driver, Challenger Co-driver, Team	P
29	(Estonia) Robert Virves	(Portugal) Hugo Magalhães	(Estonia) Robert Virves	Ford Fiesta Rally2	Challenger Driver, Challenger Co-driver	P
30	(Estonia) Georg Linnamäe	(United Kingdom) James Morgan	(Estonia) Georg Linnamäe	Hyundai i20 N Rally2	Challenger Driver, Challenger Co-driver	P
32	(Finland) Lauri Joona	(Finland) Tuukka Shemeikka	(Finland) Lauri Joona	Škoda Fabia Rally2 evo	Challenger Driver, Challenger Co-driver	P
34	(Spain) Alejandro Cachón	(Spain) Alejandro López Fernández	(Spain) Alejandro Cachón	Citroën C3 Rally2	Challenger Driver, Challenger Co-driver	P
35	(Bolivia) Marco Bulacia	(Spain) Diego Vallejo	(Germany) Toksport WRT 2	Škoda Fabia RS Rally2	Challenger Driver, Challenger Co-driver	P
36	(Portugal) Armindo Araújo	(Portugal) Luís Ramalho	(Portugal) Armindo Araújo	Škoda Fabia Rally2 evo	Challenger Driver, Challenger Co-driver	P
37	(Republic of Ireland) Josh McErlean	(Republic of Ireland) John Rowan	(Republic of Ireland) Motorsport Ireland Rally Academy	Hyundai i20 N Rally2	Challenger Driver, Challenger Co-driver, Team	P
38	(Czech Republic) Erik Cais	(Czech Republic) Petr Těšínský	(Czech Republic) Erik Cais	Škoda Fabia RS Rally2	Challenger Driver, Challenger Co-driver	P
39	(Chile) Alberto Heller	(Argentina) Luis Ernesto Allende	(Chile) Alberto Heller	Citroën C3 Rally2	Challenger Driver, Challenger Co-driver	—N/a
40	(Chile) Emilio Fernández	(Spain) Borja Rozada	(Chile) Emilio Fernández	Škoda Fabia Rally2 evo	Challenger Driver, Challenger Co-driver	P
41	(Republic of Ireland) Eamonn Kelly	(Republic of Ireland) Conor Mohan	(Republic of Ireland) Motorsport Ireland Rally Academy	Hyundai i20 N Rally2	Challenger Driver, Challenger Co-driver, Team	P
44	(Portugal) Miguel Correia	(Portugal) Jorge Eduardo Carvalho	(Portugal) Miguel Correia	Škoda Fabia Rally2 evo	Challenger Driver, Challenger Co-driver	P
45	(Portugal) Ricardo Teodósio	(Portugal) José Teixeira	(Portugal) Ricardo Teodósio	Hyundai i20 N Rally2	Challenger Driver, Challenger Co-driver	P
46	(Bolivia) Bruno Bulacia	(Spain) Axel Coronado Jiménez	(Bolivia) Marco Bulacia	Škoda Fabia Rally2 evo	Challenger Driver, Challenger Co-driver	P
47	(Poland) Mikołaj Marczyk	(Poland) Szymon Gospodarczyk	(Poland) Mikołaj Marczyk	Škoda Fabia RS Rally2	Challenger Driver, Challenger Co-driver	P
48	(Germany) Armin Kremer	(Germany) Timo Gottschalk	(Germany) Armin Kremer	Škoda Fabia RS Rally2	Challenger/Masters Driver, Challenger Co-driver	P
49	(Saudi Arabia) Rakan Al-Rashed	(Australia) Dale Moscatt	(Saudi Arabia) Rakan Al-Rashed	Škoda Fabia RS Rally2	Challenger Driver, Challenger Co-driver	P
50	(Italy) Enrico Oldrati	(Italy) Elia De Guio	(Italy) Enrico Oldrati	Škoda Fabia Rally2 evo	Challenger Driver, Challenger Co-driver	P
51	(Paraguay) Miguel Zaldivar Sr.	(Argentina) José Luis Díaz	(Paraguay) Miguel Zaldivar Sr.	Hyundai i20 N Rally2	Challenger/Masters Driver, Challenger Co-driver	P
52	(Spain) Alexander Villanueva	(Spain) José Murado González	(Spain) Alexander Villanueva	Škoda Fabia Rally2 evo	Challenger/Masters Driver, Challenger Co-driver	P
53	(Peru) Eduardo Castro	(Argentina) Fernando Mussano	(Peru) Eduardo Castro	Škoda Fabia Rally2 evo	Challenger Driver, Challenger Co-driver	P
54	(Portugal) José Pedro Fontes	(Portugal) Inês Ponte	(Portugal) José Pedro Fontes	Citroën C3 Rally2	Challenger Driver, Challenger Co-driver	P
55	(Portugal) Bernardo Sousa	(Portugal) Inês Veiga	(Portugal) Bernardo Sousa	Citroën C3 Rally2	Challenger Driver, Challenger Co-driver	P
56	(Hungary) Norbert Herczig	(Hungary) Ramón Ferencz	(Hungary) Norbert Herczig	Škoda Fabia Rally2 evo	Challenger Driver, Challenger Co-driver	P
57	(Estonia) Gregor Jeets	(Estonia) Timo Taniel	(Estonia) Gregor Jeets	Hyundai i20 N Rally2	Challenger Driver, Challenger Co-driver	P
58	(Portugal) Pedro Almeida	(Portugal) Mário Castro	(Portugal) Pedro Almeida	Škoda Fabia Rally2 evo	Challenger Driver, Challenger Co-driver	P
59	(Portugal) Pedro Meireles	(Portugal) Pedro Alves	(Portugal) Pedro Meireles	Hyundai i20 N Rally2	Challenger Driver, Challenger Co-driver	P
60	(Portugal) Lucas Simões	(Portugal) Nuno Almeida	(Portugal) Lucas Simões	Ford Fiesta Rally2	Challenger Driver, Challenger Co-driver	P
61	(Portugal) Diogo Salvi	(Portugal) António Costa	(Portugal) Diogo Salvi	Škoda Fabia R5	Challenger Driver, Challenger Co-driver	P
62	(Portugal) Paulo Caldeira	(Portugal) Ana Gonçalves	(Portugal) Paulo Caldeira	Citroën C3 Rally2	Challenger Driver, Challenger Co-driver	P
63	(Portugal) Francisco Teixeira	(Portugal) João Serôdio	(Portugal) Francisco Teixeira	Škoda Fabia Rally2 evo	Challenger Driver, Challenger Co-driver	P
64	(Portugal) Nuno Pinto	(Portugal) João Jardim Pereira	(Portugal) Nuno Pinto	Citroën C3 Rally2	Challenger Driver, Challenger Co-driver	P
65	(Qatar) Nasser Khalifa Al-Attiyah	(Italy) Giovanni Bernacchini	(Qatar) Nasser Khalifa Al-Attiyah	Ford Fiesta Rally2	Challenger Driver, Challenger Co-driver	P
66	(Spain) Miguel Díaz-Aboitiz	(Spain) Rodrigo Sanjuan de Eusebio	(Spain) Miguel Díaz-Aboitiz	Škoda Fabia Rally2 evo	Challenger/Masters Driver, Challenger Co-driver	P
67	(Italy) Luciano Cobbe	(Italy) Roberto Mometti	(Italy) Luciano Cobbe	Škoda Fabia Rally2 evo	Challenger/Masters Driver, Challenger/Masters Co-driver	P
68	(United Kingdom) Kris Meeke	(Republic of Ireland) James Fulton	(Portugal) Sports & You	Hyundai i20 N Rally2	Driver, Co-driver	P

Rally3 entries competing in the World Rally Championship-3
No.	Driver	Co-Driver	Entrant	Car	Tyre
70	(Finland) Roope Korhonen	(Finland) Anssi Viinikka	(Finland) Rautio Motorsport	Ford Fiesta Rally3	P
71	(Finland) Toni Herranen	(Finland) Mikko Lukka	(Finland) Toni Herranen	Ford Fiesta Rally3	P

Other major entries
No.	Driver	Co-Driver	Entrant	Car	Championship eligibility	Tyre
22	Nikolay Gryazin (Note: Nikolay Gryazin is Russian, but he competes as a neutral competitor using the ANA flag as Russian national emblems were banned by the association due to the Russian invasion of Ukraine.)	Konstantin Aleksandrov (Note: Konstantin Aleksandrov is Russian, but he competes as a neutral competitor using the ANA flag as Russian national emblems were banned by the association due to the Russian invasion of Ukraine.)	(Germany) Toksport WRT 2	Škoda Fabia RS Rally2	—N/a	P
31	(Finland) Sami Pajari	(Finland) Enni Mälkönen	(Germany) Toksport WRT	Škoda Fabia RS Rally2	—N/a	P
73	(Hungary) Zoltán László	(Hungary) Gábor Zsiros	(Hungary) Zoltán László	Škoda Fabia Rally2 evo	Masters Driver	P

=== Itinerary ===
All dates and times are in WEST (UTC+1).

Date	No.	Time span	Stage name	Distance
11 May	—	After 9:01	Baltar [Shakedown]	4.55 km
11 May		After 20:30	Opening ceremony, Coimbra	—N/a
12 May	SS1	After 9:05	Lousã 1	12.03 km
12 May	SS2	After 10:05	Góis 1	19.33 km
12 May	SS3	After 11:05	Arganil 1	18.72 km
12 May		12:10 – 12:25	Tyre fitting zone, Arganil	—N/a
12 May	SS4	After 13:35	Lousã 2	12.03 km
12 May	SS5	After 14:35	Góis 2	19.33 km
12 May	SS6	After 15:35	Arganil 2	18.72 km
12 May	SS7	After 17:05	Mortágua	18.15 km
12 May		18:47 – 19:02	Regroup, Figueira da Foz	—N/a
12 May	SS8	After 19:05	SSS Figueira da Foz	2.28 km
12 May		21:45 – 22:34	Flexi service A, Exponor	—N/a
13 May	SS9	After 7:35	Vieira do Minho 1	26.61 km
13 May	SS10	After 9:05	Amarante 1	37.24 km
13 May	SS11	After 10:35	Felgueiras 1	8.91 km
13 May		12:46 – 13:30	Service B, Exponor	—N/a
13 May	SS12	After 15:05	Vieira do Minho 2	26.61 km
13 May	SS13	After 16:35	Amarante 2	37.24 km
13 May	SS14	After 18:05	Felgueiras 2	8.91 km
13 May	SS15	After 19:05	SSS Lousada	3.36 km
13 May		20:15 – 21:04	Flexi service C, Exponor	—N/a
14 May	SS16	After 7:05	Paredes	15.00 km
14 May	SS17	After 8:35	Fafe 1	11.18 km
14 May	SS18	After 9:35	Cabeceiras de Basto	22.23 km
14 May		10:50 – 11:50	Regroup, Fafe	—N/a
14 May	SS19	After 12:15	Fafe 2 [Power Stage]	11.18 km
14 May		13:53 – 14:07	Service D, Exponor	—N/a

== Report ==
=== WRC Rally1 ===
==== Classification ====
Position		No.	Driver	Co-driver	Entrant	Car	Time	Difference	Points	
Event	Class	No.	Driver	Co-driver	Entrant	Car	Time	Difference	Event	Stage
1	1	69	Kalle Rovanperä	Jonne Halttunen	Toyota Gazoo Racing WRT	Toyota GR Yaris Rally1	3:35:11.7	0.0	25	5
2	2	6	Dani Sordo	Cándido Carrera	Hyundai Shell Mobis WRT	Hyundai i20 N Rally1	3:36:06.4	+54.7	18	1
3	3	4	Esapekka Lappi	Janne Ferm	Hyundai Shell Mobis WRT	Hyundai i20 N Rally1	3:36:32.0	+1:20.3	15	3
4	4	8	Ott Tänak	Martin Järveoja	M-Sport Ford WRT	Ford Puma Rally1	3:37:15.8	+2:04.1	12	4
5	5	11	Thierry Neuville	Martijn Wydaeghe	Hyundai Shell Mobis WRT	Hyundai i20 N Rally1	3:43:34.2	+8:22.5	10	0
32	6	7	Pierre-Louis Loubet	Nicolas Gilsoul	M-Sport Ford WRT	Ford Puma Rally1	4:36:40.7	+1:01:29.0	0	0
33	7	18	Takamoto Katsuta	Aaron Johnston	Toyota Gazoo Racing WRT	Toyota GR Yaris Rally1	4:37:06.5	+1:01:54.8	0	2
Retired SS7		33	Elfyn Evans	Scott Martin	Toyota Gazoo Racing WRT	Toyota GR Yaris Rally1	Crash		0	0

==== Special stages ====
Stage	Winners	Car	Time	Class leaders
SD	Evans / Martin	Toyota GR Yaris Rally1	2:53.4	—N/a
SS1	Loubet / Gilsoul	Ford Puma Rally1	9:02.7	Loubet / Gilsoul
SS2	Tänak / Järveoja	Ford Puma Rally1	12:59.3	Tänak / Järveoja
SS3	Rovanperä / Halttunen	Toyota GR Yaris Rally1	11:49.3	Tänak / Järveoja
SS4	Lappi / Ferm	Hyundai i20 N Rally1	8:56.3	Sordo / Carrera
SS5	Rovanperä / Halttunen	Toyota GR Yaris Rally1	13:03.9	Rovanperä / Halttunen
SS6	Rovanperä / Halttunen	Toyota GR Yaris Rally1	11:53.8	Rovanperä / Halttunen
SS7	Lappi / Ferm	Hyundai i20 N Rally1	11:56.7	Rovanperä / Halttunen
SS8	Sordo / Carrera	Hyundai i20 N Rally1	2:29.8	Rovanperä / Halttunen
SS9	Rovanperä / Halttunen	Toyota GR Yaris Rally1	16:50.6	Rovanperä / Halttunen
SS10	Rovanperä / Halttunen	Toyota GR Yaris Rally1	24:33.3	Rovanperä / Halttunen
SS11	Rovanperä / Halttunen	Toyota GR Yaris Rally1	5:57.3	Rovanperä / Halttunen
SS12	Rovanperä / Halttunen	Toyota GR Yaris Rally1	16:54.1	Rovanperä / Halttunen
SS13	Sordo / Carrera	Hyundai i20 N Rally1	24:31.2	Rovanperä / Halttunen
SS14	Rovanperä / Halttunen	Toyota GR Yaris Rally1	5:57.3	Rovanperä / Halttunen
SS15	Sordo / Carrera	Hyundai i20 N Rally1	2:34.5	Rovanperä / Halttunen
SS16	Katsuta / Johnston	Toyota GR Yaris Rally1	8:02.9	Rovanperä / Halttunen
SS17	Rovanperä / Halttunen	Toyota GR Yaris Rally1	6:42.1	Rovanperä / Halttunen
SS18	Tänak / Järveoja	Ford Puma Rally1	13:48.5	Rovanperä / Halttunen
SS19	Rovanperä / Halttunen	Toyota GR Yaris Rally1	6:26.5	Rovanperä / Halttunen

==== Championship standings ====
Pos.	Drivers' championships			Co-drivers' championships			Manufacturers' championships		
Pos.	Move	Driver	Points	Move	Co-driver	Points	Move	Manufacturer	Points
1	2	Kalle Rovanperä	98	2	Jonne Halttunen	98		Toyota Gazoo Racing WRT	201
2	2	Ott Tänak	81	2	Martin Järveoja	81		Hyundai Shell Mobis WRT	169
3	2	Sébastien Ogier	69	2	Vincent Landais	69		M-Sport Ford WRT	134
4	2	Elfyn Evans	69	2	Scott Martin	69			
5		Thierry Neuville	68		Martijn Wydaeghe	68			

=== WRC-2 Rally2 ===
==== Classification ====
Position		No.	Driver	Co-driver	Entrant	Car	Time	Difference	Points		
Event	Class	No.	Driver	Co-driver	Entrant	Car	Time	Difference	Class	Stage	Event
6	1	20	Gus Greensmith	Jonas Andersson	Toksport WRT 3	Škoda Fabia RS Rally2	3:44:55.1	0.0	25	0	0
7	2	21	Oliver Solberg	Elliott Edmondson	Oliver Solberg	Škoda Fabia RS Rally2	3:44:56.3	+1.2	18	3	0
8	3	24	Andreas Mikkelsen	Torstein Eriksen	Toksport WRT 3	Škoda Fabia RS Rally2	3:45:38.1	+43.0	15	2	0
9	4	26	Yohan Rossel	Arnaud Dunand	PH Sport	Citroën C3 Rally2	3:46:44.9	+1:49.8	12	0	0
10	5	23	Teemu Suninen	Mikko Markkula	Hyundai Motorsport N	Hyundai i20 N Rally2	3:47:28.0	+2:32.9	10	0	0
11	6	35	Marco Bulacia	Diego Vallejo	Toksport WRT 2	Škoda Fabia RS Rally2	3:48:02.4	+3:07.3	8	0	0
12	7	37	Josh McErlean	John Rowan	Motorsport Ireland Rally Academy	Hyundai i20 N Rally2	3:50:03.4	+5:08.3	6	0	0
13	8	40	Emilio Fernández	Borja Rozada	Emilio Fernández	Škoda Fabia Rally2 evo	3:50:12.9	+5:17.8	4	0	0
14	9	47	Mikołaj Marczyk	Szymon Gospodarczyk	Mikołaj Marczyk	Škoda Fabia Rally2 evo	3:50:27.1	+5:32.0	2	0	0
15	10	25	Adrien Fourmaux	Alexandre Coria	M-Sport Ford WRT	Ford Fiesta Rally2	3:51:38.2	+6:43.1	1	1	0
16	11	32	Lauri Joona	Tuukka Shemeikka	Lauri Joona	Škoda Fabia Rally2 evo	3:51:46.4	+6:51.3	0	0	0
17	12	36	Armindo Araújo	Luís Ramalho	Armindo Araújo	Škoda Fabia Rally2 evo	3:55:44.8	+10:49.7	0	0	0
18	13	34	Alejandro Cachón	Alejandro López Fernández	Alejandro Cachón	Citroën C3 Rally2	3:57:13.5	+12:18.4	0	0	0
19	14	52	Alexander Villanueva	José Murado González	Alexander Villanueva	Škoda Fabia Rally2 evo	3:59:30.0	+14:34.9	0	0	0
20	15	50	Enrico Oldrati	Elia De Guio	Enrico Oldrati	Škoda Fabia Rally2 evo	4:04:28.0	+19:32.9	0	0	0
23	16	64	Nuno Pinto	João Jardim Pereira	Nuno Pinto	Citroën C3 Rally2	4:20:40.4	+35:45.3	0	0	0
24	17	67	Luciano Cobbe	Roberto Mometti	Luciano Cobbe	Škoda Fabia Rally2 evo	4:23:27.8	+38:32.7	0	0	0
26	18	46	Bruno Bulacia	Axel Coronado Jiménez	Bruno Bulacia	Škoda Fabia Rally2 evo	4:26:05.0	+41:09.9	0	0	0
27	19	63	Francisco Teixeira	João Serôdio	Francisco Teixeira	Škoda Fabia Rally2 evo	4:31:57.2	+47:02.1	0	0	0
28	20	45	Ricardo Teodósio	José Teixeira	Ricardo Teodósio	Hyundai i20 N Rally2	4:31:59.3	+47:04.2	0	0	0
29	21	57	Gregor Jeets	Timo Taniel	Gregor Jeets	Hyundai i20 N Rally2	4:34:02.6	+49:07.5	0	0	0
31	22	49	Rakan Al-Rashed	Dale Moscatt	Rakan Al-Rashed	Škoda Fabia RS Rally2	4:36:28.1	+51:33.0	0	0	0
34	23	38	Erik Cais	Petr Těšínský	Erik Cais	Škoda Fabia RS Rally2	4:39:22.0	+54:26.9	0	0	0
36	24	41	Eamonn Kelly	Conor Mohan	Motorsport Ireland Rally Academy	Hyundai i20 N Rally2	4:48:55.5	+1:04:00.4	0	0	0
38	25	65	Nasser Khalifa Al-Attiyah	Giovanni Bernacchini	Nasser Khalifa Al-Attiyah	Ford Fiesta Rally2	5:01:25.8	+1:16:30.7	0	0	0
41	26	30	Georg Linnamäe	James Morgan	Georg Linnamäe	Hyundai i20 N Rally2	5:17:54.4	+1:32:59.3	0	0	0
42	27	28	Grégoire Munster	Giovanni Bernacchini	M-Sport Ford WRT	Ford Fiesta Rally2	5:23:32.4	+1:38:37.3	0	0	0
Retired SS16		61	Diogo Salvi	António Costa	Diogo Salvi	Škoda Fabia R5	Withdrawn		0	0	0
Retired SS15		56	Norbert Herczig	Ramón Ferencz	Norbert Herczig	Škoda Fabia Rally2 evo	Mechanical		0	0	0
Retired SS14		44	Miguel Correia	Jorge Eduardo Carvalho	Miguel Correia	Škoda Fabia Rally2 evo	Engine		0	0	0
Retired SS13		27	Fabrizio Zaldivar	Marcelo Der Ohannesian	Hyundai Motorsport N	Hyundai i20 N Rally2	Accident		0	0	0
Retired SS13		51	Miguel Zaldivar Sr.	José Luis Díaz	Miguel Zaldivar Sr.	Hyundai i20 N Rally2	Mechanical		0	0	0
Retired SS13		66	Miguel Díaz-Aboitiz	Rodrigo Sanjuan de Eusebio	Miguel Díaz-Aboitiz	Škoda Fabia Rally2 evo	Accident		0	0	0
Retired SS9		48	Armin Kremer	Timo Gottschalk	Armin Kremer	Škoda Fabia RS Rally2	Wheel studs		0	0	0
Completed SS9		55	José Pedro Fontes	Inês Ponte	José Pedro Fontes	Citroën C3 Rally2	National Only		0	0	0
Completed SS9		55	Bernardo Sousa	Inês Veiga	Bernardo Sousa	Citroën C3 Rally2	National Only		0	0	0
Completed SS9		58	Pedro Almeida	Mário Castro	Pedro Almeida	Škoda Fabia Rally2 evo	National Only		0	0	0
Retired SS9		59	Pedro Meireles	Pedro Alves	Pedro Meireles	Hyundai i20 N Rally2	Withdrawn		0	0	0
Completed SS9		60	Lucas Simões	Nuno Almeida	Lucas Simões	Ford Fiesta Rally2	National Only		0	0	0
Retired SS4		68	Kris Meeke	James Fulton	Sports & You	Hyundai i20 N Rally2	Suspension		0	0	0
Did not start		39	Alberto Heller	Luis Ernesto Allende	Alberto Heller	Citroën C3 Rally2	Driver illness		0	0	0

==== Special stages ====
Overall
Stage	Winners	Car	Time	Class leaders
SD	Solberg / Edmondson	Škoda Fabia RS Rally2	3:00.3	—N/a
SS1	Suninen / Markkula	Hyundai i20 N Rally2	9:19.0	Suninen / Markkula
SS2	Fourmaux / Coria	Ford Fiesta Rally2	13:34.3	Fourmaux / Coria
SS3	Mikkelsen / Eriksen	Škoda Fabia RS Rally2	12:35.8	Fourmaux / Coria
SS4	Solberg / Edmondson	Škoda Fabia RS Rally2	9:15.5	Fourmaux / Coria
SS5	Solberg / Edmondson	Škoda Fabia RS Rally2	13:36.7	Solberg / Edmondson
SS6	Mikkelsen / Eriksen	Škoda Fabia RS Rally2	12:33.9	Solberg / Edmondson
SS7	Mikkelsen / Eriksen	Škoda Fabia RS Rally2	12:21.8	Solberg / Edmondson
SS8	Greensmith / Andersson	Škoda Fabia RS Rally2	2:35.0	Solberg / Edmondson
SS9	Fourmaux / Coria	Ford Fiesta Rally2	17:35.4	Solberg / Edmondson
SS10	Fourmaux / Coria	Ford Fiesta Rally2	25:31.1	Solberg / Edmondson
SS11	Greensmith / Andersson	Škoda Fabia RS Rally2	6:16.0	Solberg / Edmondson
SS12	Fourmaux / Coria	Ford Fiesta Rally2	17:30.0	Solberg / Edmondson
SS13	Mikkelsen / Eriksen	Škoda Fabia RS Rally2	25:24.9	Solberg / Edmondson
SS14	Solberg / Edmondson	Škoda Fabia RS Rally2	6:06.3	Solberg / Edmondson
SS15	Bulacia / Vallejo	Škoda Fabia RS Rally2	2:38.0	Solberg / Edmondson
SS16	Solberg / Edmondson	Škoda Fabia RS Rally2	8:14.7	Greensmith / Andersson
SS17	Solberg / Edmondson	Škoda Fabia RS Rally2	6:52.9	Greensmith / Andersson
SS18	Solberg / Edmondson	Škoda Fabia RS Rally2	14:07.4	Greensmith / Andersson
SS19	Solberg / Edmondson	Škoda Fabia RS Rally2	6:44.4	Greensmith / Andersson

Challenger
Stage	Winners	Car	Time	Class leaders
SD	Virves / Magalhães	Ford Fiesta Rally2	3:02.3	—N/a
SS1	Bulacia / Vallejo	Škoda Fabia RS Rally2	9:21.2	Bulacia / Vallejo
SS2	Linnamäe / Morgan	Hyundai i20 N Rally2	13:45.8	Bulacia / Vallejo
SS3	Bulacia / Vallejo	Škoda Fabia RS Rally2	12:49.9	Bulacia / Vallejo
SS4	Cachón / López Fernández	Citroën C3 Rally2	3:02.3	Bulacia / Vallejo
SS5	Linnamäe / Morgan	Hyundai i20 N Rally2	13:44.0	Bulacia / Vallejo
SS6	Bulacia / Vallejo	Škoda Fabia RS Rally2	12:44.2	Bulacia / Vallejo
SS7	Virves / Magalhães	Ford Fiesta Rally2	12:36.3	Bulacia / Vallejo
SS8	Virves / Magalhães	Ford Fiesta Rally2	2:37.4	Bulacia / Vallejo
SS9	Bulacia / Vallejo	Škoda Fabia RS Rally2	17:47.6	Bulacia / Vallejo
SS10	Bulacia / Vallejo	Škoda Fabia RS Rally2	25:41.5	Bulacia / Vallejo
SS11	Zaldivar / Der Ohannesian	Hyundai i20 N Rally2	6:16.1	Bulacia / Vallejo
SS12	Bulacia / Vallejo	Škoda Fabia RS Rally2	17:41.3	Bulacia / Vallejo
SS13	Fernández / Rozada	Škoda Fabia Rally2 evo	25:49.3	Bulacia / Vallejo
SS14	McErlean / Rowan	Hyundai i20 N Rally2	6:16.2	Bulacia / Vallejo
SS15	Bulacia / Vallejo	Škoda Fabia RS Rally2	2:38.0	Bulacia / Vallejo
SS16	Bulacia / Vallejo	Škoda Fabia RS Rally2	8:21.7	Bulacia / Vallejo
SS17	Linnamäe / Morgan	Hyundai i20 N Rally2	6:56.5	Bulacia / Vallejo
SS18	Bulacia / Vallejo	Škoda Fabia RS Rally2	14:20.7	Bulacia / Vallejo
SS19	Marczyk / Gospodarczyk	Škoda Fabia RS Rally2	6:50.7	Bulacia / Vallejo

==== Championship standings ====
Pos.	Open Drivers' championships			Open Co-drivers' championships			Teams' championships			Challenger Drivers' championships			Challenger Co-drivers' championships		
Pos.	Move	Driver	Points	Move	Co-driver	Points	Move	Manufacturer	Points	Move	Manufacturer	Points	Move	Driver	Points
1		Yohan Rossel	65		Arnaud Dunand	65		Toksport WRT	80		Nikolay Gryazin	50		Konstantin Aleksandrov	50
2	1	Oliver Solberg	64	1	Elliott Edmondson	64	1	M-Sport Ford WRT	76	2	Marco Bulacia	50		Enni Mälkönen	43
3	1	Gus Greensmith	62	1	Jonas Andersson	62	1	Toksport WRT 2	65	1	Sami Pajari	43	6	Diego Vallejo	40
4	2	Emil Lindholm	44	2	Reeta Hämäläinen	44		Hyundai Motorsport N	45	1	Kajetan Kajetanowicz	25	1	Borja Rozada	33
5	1	Nikolay Gryazin	38	1	Konstantin Aleksandrov	38	New entry	Toksport WRT 3	43	8	Lauri Joona	22	2	Maciej Szczepaniak	25

=== WRC-3 Rally3 ===
==== Classification ====
Position		No.	Driver	Co-driver	Entrant	Car	Time	Difference	Points
Event	Class	No.	Driver	Co-driver	Entrant	Car	Time	Difference	Points
21	1	70	Roope Korhonen	Anssi Viinikka	Rautio Motorsport	Ford Fiesta Rally3	4:11:51.5	0.0	25
44	2	71	Toni Herranen	Mikko Lukka	Toni Herranen	Ford Fiesta Rally3	5:31:28.9	+1:19:37.4	18

==== Special stages ====
Stage	Winners	Car	Time	Class leaders
SD	Korhonen / Viinikka	Ford Fiesta Rally3	3:17.3	—N/a
SS1	Herranen / Lukka	Ford Fiesta Rally3	10:17.7	Herranen / Lukka
SS2	Korhonen / Viinikka	Ford Fiesta Rally3	15:06.2	Korhonen / Viinikka
SS3	Korhonen / Viinikka	Ford Fiesta Rally3	14:09.3	Korhonen / Viinikka
SS4	Herranen / Lukka	Ford Fiesta Rally3	10:18.5	Korhonen / Viinikka
SS5	Herranen / Lukka	Ford Fiesta Rally3	18:45.0	Korhonen / Viinikka
SS6	Korhonen / Viinikka	Ford Fiesta Rally3	15:10.0	Korhonen / Viinikka
SS7	Korhonen / Viinikka	Ford Fiesta Rally3	13:49.2	Korhonen / Viinikka
SS8	Korhonen / Viinikka	Ford Fiesta Rally3	2:49.7	Korhonen / Viinikka
SS9	Korhonen / Viinikka	Ford Fiesta Rally3	19:08.9	Korhonen / Viinikka
SS10	Korhonen / Viinikka	Ford Fiesta Rally3	27:44.5	Korhonen / Viinikka
SS11	Korhonen / Viinikka	Ford Fiesta Rally3	6:40.2	Korhonen / Viinikka
SS12	Korhonen / Viinikka	Ford Fiesta Rally3	19:32.8	Korhonen / Viinikka
SS13	Korhonen / Viinikka	Ford Fiesta Rally3	27:44.5	Korhonen / Viinikka
SS14	Korhonen / Viinikka	Ford Fiesta Rally3	6:52.2	Korhonen / Viinikka
SS15	Korhonen / Viinikka	Ford Fiesta Rally3	2:50.0	Korhonen / Viinikka
SS16	Korhonen / Viinikka	Ford Fiesta Rally3	8:59.3	Korhonen / Viinikka
SS17	Herranen / Lukka	Ford Fiesta Rally3	7:34.8	Korhonen / Viinikka
SS18	Herranen / Lukka	Ford Fiesta Rally3	15:30.5	Korhonen / Viinikka
SS19	Herranen / Lukka	Ford Fiesta Rally3	7:29.4	Korhonen / Viinikka

==== Championship standings ====
Pos.	Drivers' championships			Co-drivers' championships		
Pos.	Move	Driver	Points	Move	Co-driver	Points
1	3	Roope Korhonen	50	3	Anssi Viinikka	50
2	1	Diego Dominguez Jr.	37	1	Rogelio Peñate	37
3	1	William Creighton	28	1	Liam Regan	28
4	1	Tom Rensonnet	28	1	Loïc Dumont	28
5		Eamonn Kelly	25		Conor Mohan	25

== Notes ==
Previous rally: 2023 Croatia Rally	2023 FIA World Rally Championship	Next rally: 2023 Rally Italia Sardegna
Previous rally: 2022 Rally de Portugal	2023 Rally de Portugal	Next rally: 2024 Rally de Portugal
