= Sami Pajari =

Finnish rally driver (born 2001)

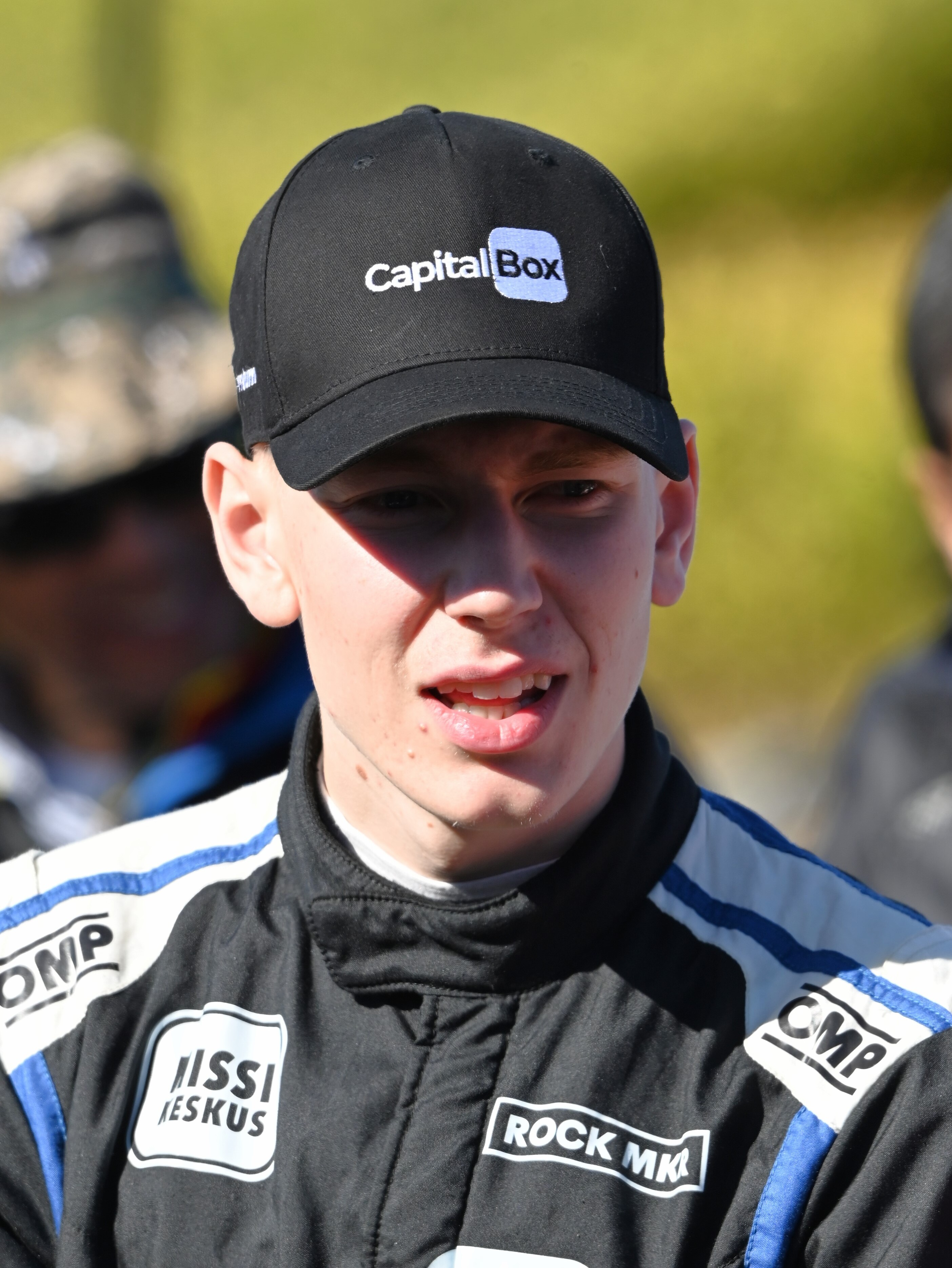
- Pajari at the 2024 Rally Japan

Personal information
- Nationality: (Finland) Finnish
- Full name: Sami Erik Pajari
- Born: 1 December 2001 (age 24); Lahti, Finland

World Rally Championship record
- Years active: 2019–present
- Co-driver: (Finland) Antti Haapala (Finland) Marko Salminen (Finland) Enni Mälkönen
- Teams: Toksport WRT, Printsport, Toyota Gazoo Racing WRT
- Rallies: 70
- Championships: 0
- Rally wins: 3
- Podiums: 10
- Stage wins: 37
- Total points: 400
- First rally: 2019 Rally Finland
- First win: 2026 Rally Estonia
- Last win: 2026 Rally del Paraguay
- Last rally: 2026 Rally Italia Sardegna

Sami Erik Pajari (Finnish pronunciation: [ˈsɑmi ˈpɑjɑri]; born 1 December 2001) is a Finnish professional rally driver. He won the Junior WRC Championship in 2021. Pajari then won the 2024 WRC2 Championship. In 2025, he moved full-time to the top class in WRC. Pajari won his first rally in the WRC in 2026 Rally Estonia, and he also won the next two events in Finland and Paraguay – winning three wins in a row. He holds a WRC record for that – winning the most consecutive rallies after your first WRC win (three wins).

== Career ==
Born and raised in Lahti, Pajari began rallying at a young age, inspired by his father Pertti. His first competition was a rally sprint in Lahti in 2016 when he was 14. Pajari's first competition in rallying was the Kaasujalka rally that same year, where he finished fourth in the youth category. In the early stages of his career, Pajari's co-driver was his father Pertti.

In 2017, Pajari achieved several class victories in national rallies with an Opel Astra. With this success, he began to focus more on rallying and immediately won the Finnish Youth Championship. In 2018, Pajari also drove one rally in Lithuania with a Ford Fiesta R2, finishing second in his class.

In the 2019 rally season, Pajari participated in the Finnish Rally Championship in the SM3 class with a Ford Fiesta R2. In the summer, he won the AKK's Star of the Future award, which earned him a competition package for the Finnish Rally Championship in the JWRC class with an M-Sport Ford Fiesta. However, the race ended in disqualification. At the end of the 2019 season, Pajari was crowned the winner of the SM3 series. He won one race, finished second once and third three times.

In 2020, Pajari competed not only domestically but also abroad. He participated in four races in the JWRC series, his best result being second place in the Estonian Rally. Pajari was third in the series points. He finished second in the SM3 class points.

In the 2021 rally season, Pajari improved on his previous year's results and won the JWRC junior championship. He also became the first Finnish winner of the series and also the youngest champion in the history of the competition class. Pajari participated in five events in the series, winning Rally Estonia and Rally Catalonia. His co-driver in the series events was Marko Salminen. In 2021, Pajari also drove in the ERC3 junior category of the European Rally Championship, where he finished third.

For 2022, Pajari's co-driver was Enni Mälkönen, who had already participated in some races with Pajari the previous year. The first race of the season, the Monte Carlo Rally, was Pajari's first race with a four-wheel drive car and in the WRC3 class, and he drove to a class victory in the races. In the summer of 2022, Pajari made his WRC2 class debut at the Sardinia Rally in the Toksport WRT team's Škoda Fabia, finishing fifth in the class. In 2022, Pajari was second in the WRC3 series, with Lauri Joona driving to the series win and Jan Černý finishing third.

In the 2023 season, Pajari drove a Toksport Škoda Fabia RS Rally2 in the WRC2 class. In 2023, Pajari and Mälkönen won the Rally Finland in the WRC2 class, which put them in the lead of the WRC2 Challenger series.

In the 2024 season, Pajari and Mälkönen would compete in the new Toyota GR Yaris Rally2 car for the Printsport Racing team. At the 2024 Rally Sardinia, Pajari and Mälkönen won the WRC2 class race. At the Finnish Rally Championship, Pajari and Mälkönen would compete in the Toyota GR Yaris Rally1 car. There was earlier news that they would participate in the Latvian Rally Championship, but this was moved up one race. Pajari and Mälkönen won the WRC2 class race at the Polish Rally, which moved them up to second place in the WRC2 series. At the Latvian Rally, Pajari finished third in the WRC2 class and moved up in the series ahead of Yohan Rossel, but Oliver Solberg, who won the race, moved up to first place in the series points. At the Finnish Rally Championship, Pajari drove the fastest special stage time in the top class for the first time. Pajari won the WRC2 class at the Rally of Greece, where he finished the same time as Robert Virves, but the race was decided by the victory on the first special stage. In September, it was announced that Pajari and Mälkönen would compete in the Toyota Gazoo Racing Rally1 car at the Rally Chile and the Central European Rally. Pajari and Mälkönen finished second in the WRC2 class at the Rally of Japan, securing the WRC2 championship. After the Rally of Japan, it was announced that Mälkönen would no longer be Pajari's co-driver for the following season.

In the 2025 season, Pajari drove Toyota's fourth Rally1 car and was co-driver of Marko Salminen. Pajari achieved his first podium finish in the Rally1 class at the Rally Japan.

In the 2026 season, Pajari drove to his first WRC victory at Rally Estonia. Pajari drove to victory at Rally Finland, which was the 200th victory by a Finnish driver in the WRC. Pajari is also the 14th Finnish driver to win at Rally Finland. Pajari and Salminen became the first duo in WRC history to achieve their first three consecutive race wins by winning Rally Paraguay.

== Rally victories ==
=== WRC victories ===
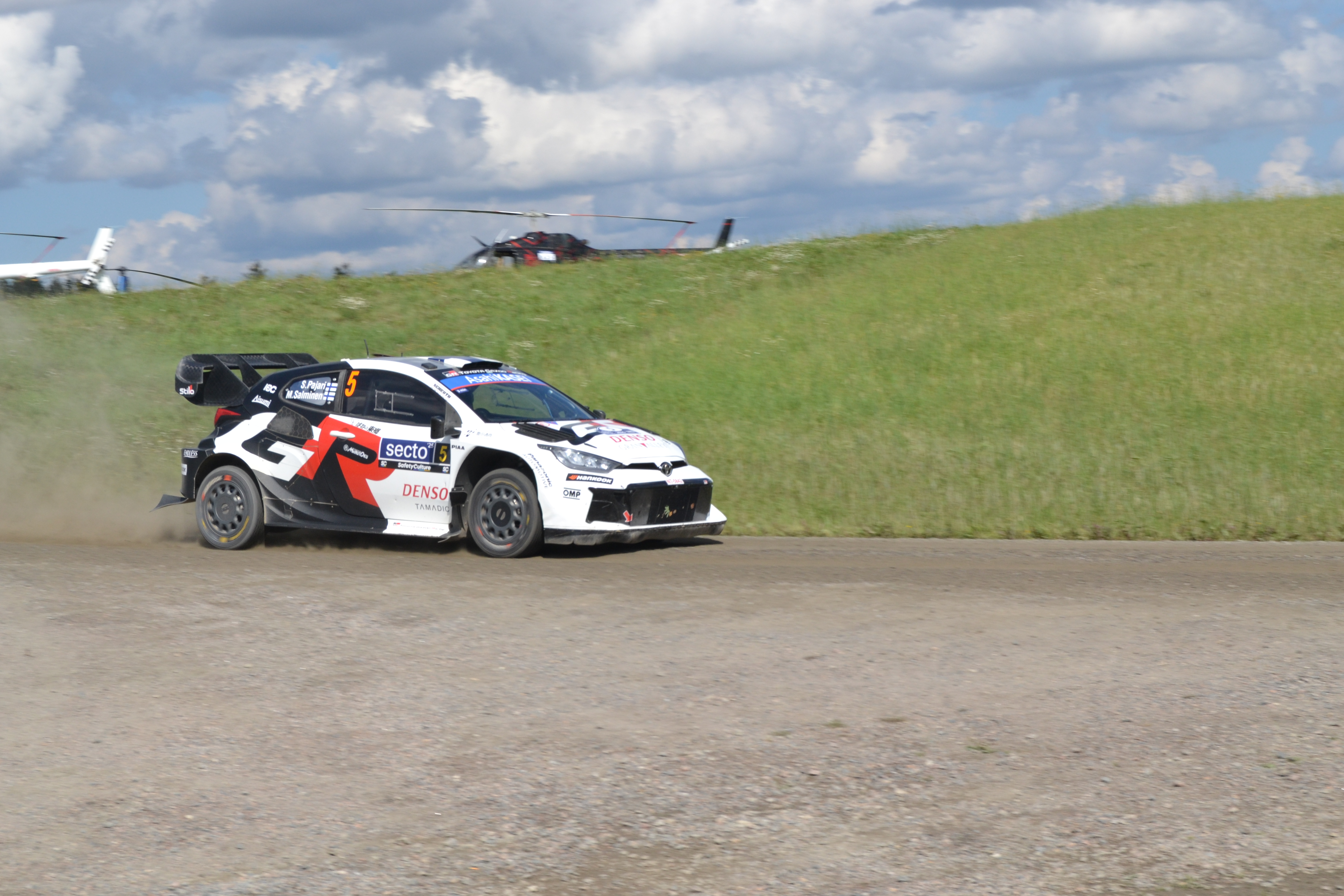
Sami Pajari during the Rally Finland 2025

#	Event	Season	Co-driver	Car	Ref.
1	2026 Rally Estonia	2026	(Finland) Marko Salminen	Toyota GR Yaris Rally1	
2	2026 Rally Finland	2026	(Finland) Marko Salminen	Toyota GR Yaris Rally1	
3	2026 Rally del Paraguay	2026	(Finland) Marko Salminen	Toyota GR Yaris Rally1	

=== WRC-2 victories ===
#	Event	Season	Co-driver	Car	Ref.
1	2023 Rally Finland	2023	(Finland) Enni Mälkönen	Škoda Fabia RS Rally2	
2	(Italy) 2024 Rally Italia Sardegna	2024	(Finland) Enni Mälkönen	Toyota GR Yaris Rally2	
3	2024 Rally Poland	2024	(Finland) Enni Mälkönen	Toyota GR Yaris Rally2	
4	(Greece) 2024 Acropolis Rally	2024	(Finland) Enni Mälkönen	Toyota GR Yaris Rally2	

== Results ==
=== WRC results ===
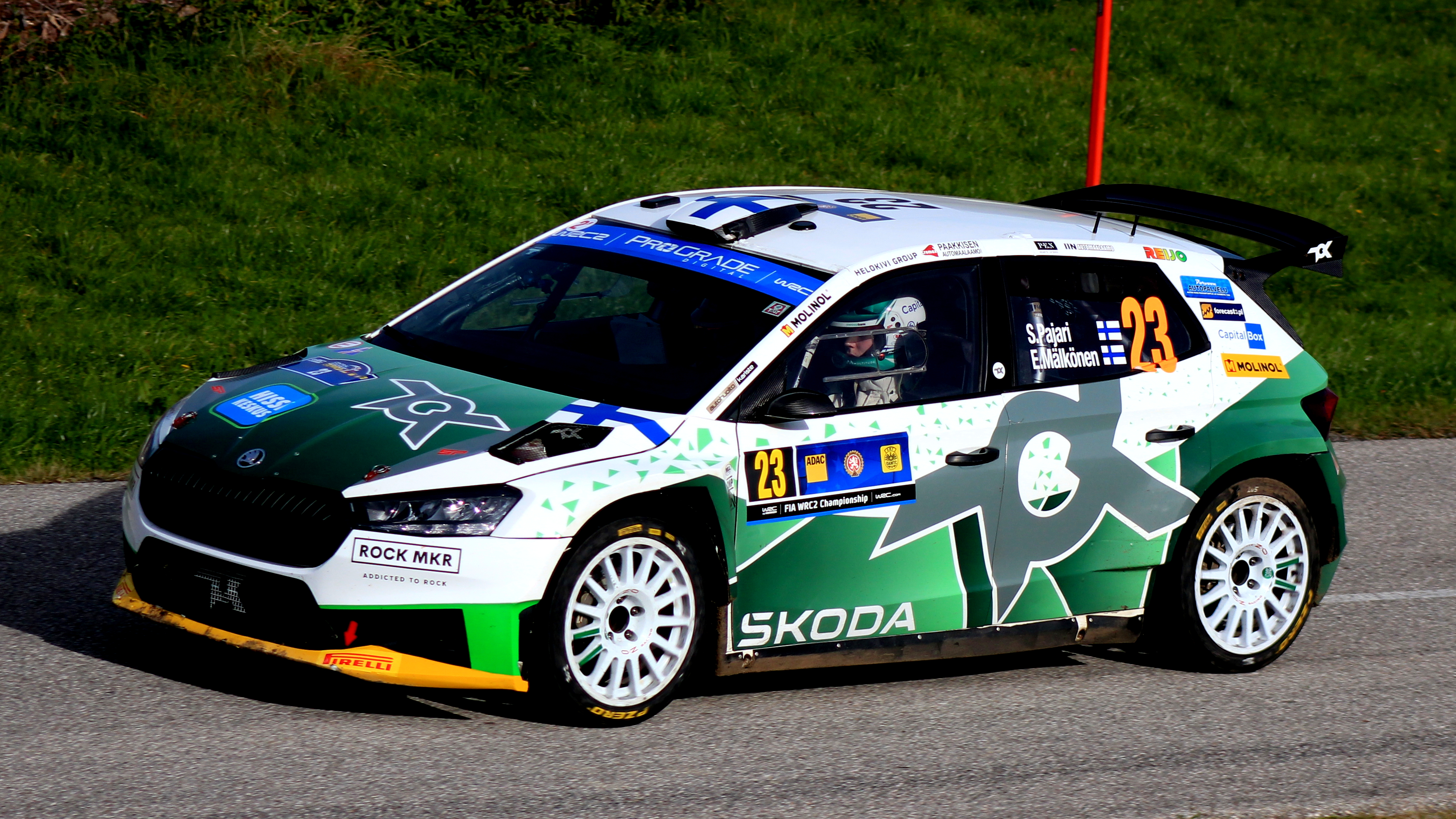
Pajari during the 2023 Central European Rally.

Year	Entrant	Car	1	2	3	4	5	6	7	8	9	10	11	12	13	14	Pos.	Points
2019	Team Flying Finn	Ford Fiesta R2T19	MON	SWE	MEX	FRA	ARG	CHL	POR	ITA	FIN; Ret	GER	TUR	GBR	ESP	AUS; C	NC	0
2020	Team Flying Finn	Ford Fiesta Rally4	MON	SWE; 29	MEX	EST; 29	TUR	ITA; 44	MNZ; 71								NC	0
2021	Sami Pajari	Ford Fiesta Rally4	MON	ARC; 28													NC	0
2021	Porvoon Autopalvelu	Ford Fiesta Rally4			CRO; 25	POR; 28	ITA	KEN	EST; 21	BEL; 21	GRE	FIN	ESP; 28	MNZ			NC	0
2022	Sami Pajari	Ford Fiesta Rally3	MON; 22	SWE; 31	CRO; Ret	POR; 17		KEN	EST; 16		BEL; 53	GRE; 43	NZL				NC	0
2022	Sami Pajari	Škoda Fabia Rally2 evo					ITA; 12			FIN; 21				ESP; 17	JPN; 11		NC	0
2023	Toksport WRT	Škoda Fabia RS Rally2	MON; WD	SWE; 10	MEX	CRO; 13	POR; 22	ITA; 29	KEN	EST; 10							17th	12
2023	Toksport WRT 2	Škoda Fabia RS Rally2									FIN; 7	GRE; Ret	CHL; 8	EUR; 13	JPN		17th	12
2024	Printsport	Toyota GR Yaris Rally2	MON; 12	SWE; 6	KEN	CRO; 10	POR; Ret	ITA; 6	POL; 9	LAT; 12		GRE; 4			JPN; 8		10th	44
2024	Toyota Gazoo Racing WRT	Toyota GR Yaris Rally1									FIN; 4		CHL; 6	EUR; Ret			10th	44
2025	Toyota Gazoo Racing WRT2	Toyota GR Yaris Rally1	MON; Ret	SWE; 7	KEN; 4	ESP; Ret	POR; 7	ITA; 7	GRE; 46	EST; 7	FIN; 5	PAR; 6	CHL; 5	EUR; 6	JPN; 3	SAU; 4	8th	107
2026	Toyota Gazoo Racing WRT2	Toyota GR Yaris Rally1	MON; Ret	SWE; 3	KEN; 3	CRO; 2	ESP; 3	POR; 7	JPN; 3	GRE; 4	EST; 1	FIN; 1	PAR; 1	CHL; 4	ITA; 3		3rd	237

* Season still in progress.

=== WRC-2 results ===
Year	Entrant	Car	1	2	3	4	5	6	7	8	9	10	11	12	13	Pos.	Points
2022	Sami Pajari	Škoda Fabia Rally2 evo	MON	SWE	CRO	POR	ITA; 5	KEN	EST	FIN; 10	BEL	GRE	NZL	ESP; 7	JPN; 5	14th	30
2023	Toksport WRT	Škoda Fabia RS Rally2	MON	SWE; 3	MEX	CRO; 5	POR	ITA; 19	KEN	EST; 2						7th	86
2023	Toksport WRT 2	Škoda Fabia RS Rally2									FIN; 1	GRE; Ret	CHL; 3	EUR	JPN	7th	86
2024	Printsport	Toyota GR Yaris Rally2	MON	SWE; 2	KEN	CRO	POR; Ret	ITA; 1	POL; 1	LAT; 3	FIN	GRE; 1	CHL	EUR	JPN; 2	1st	126

=== WRC-3 Open results ===
Year	Entrant	Car	1	2	3	4	5	6	7	8	9	10	11	12	13	Pos.	Points
2022	Sami Pajari	Ford Fiesta Rally3	MON; 1	SWE; 4	CRO; Ret	POR; 1	ITA	KEN	EST; 1	FIN	BEL	GRE	NZL	ESP	JPN	2nd	87

=== JWRC results ===
Year	Entrant	Car	1	2	3	4	5	WDC	Points
2019	Team Flying Finn	Ford Fiesta R2T19	SWE	FRA	ITA	FIN; Ret	GBR	17th	2
2020	Team Flying Finn	Ford Fiesta Rally4	SWE; 4	EST; 2	ITA; 5	MNZ; 4		3rd	66
2021	Porvoon Autopalvelu	Ford Fiesta Rally4	CRO; 6	POR; 2	EST; 1	BEL; 2	ESP; 1	1st	145
