= Toksport =

Motorsport team

(Germany) Toksport WRT
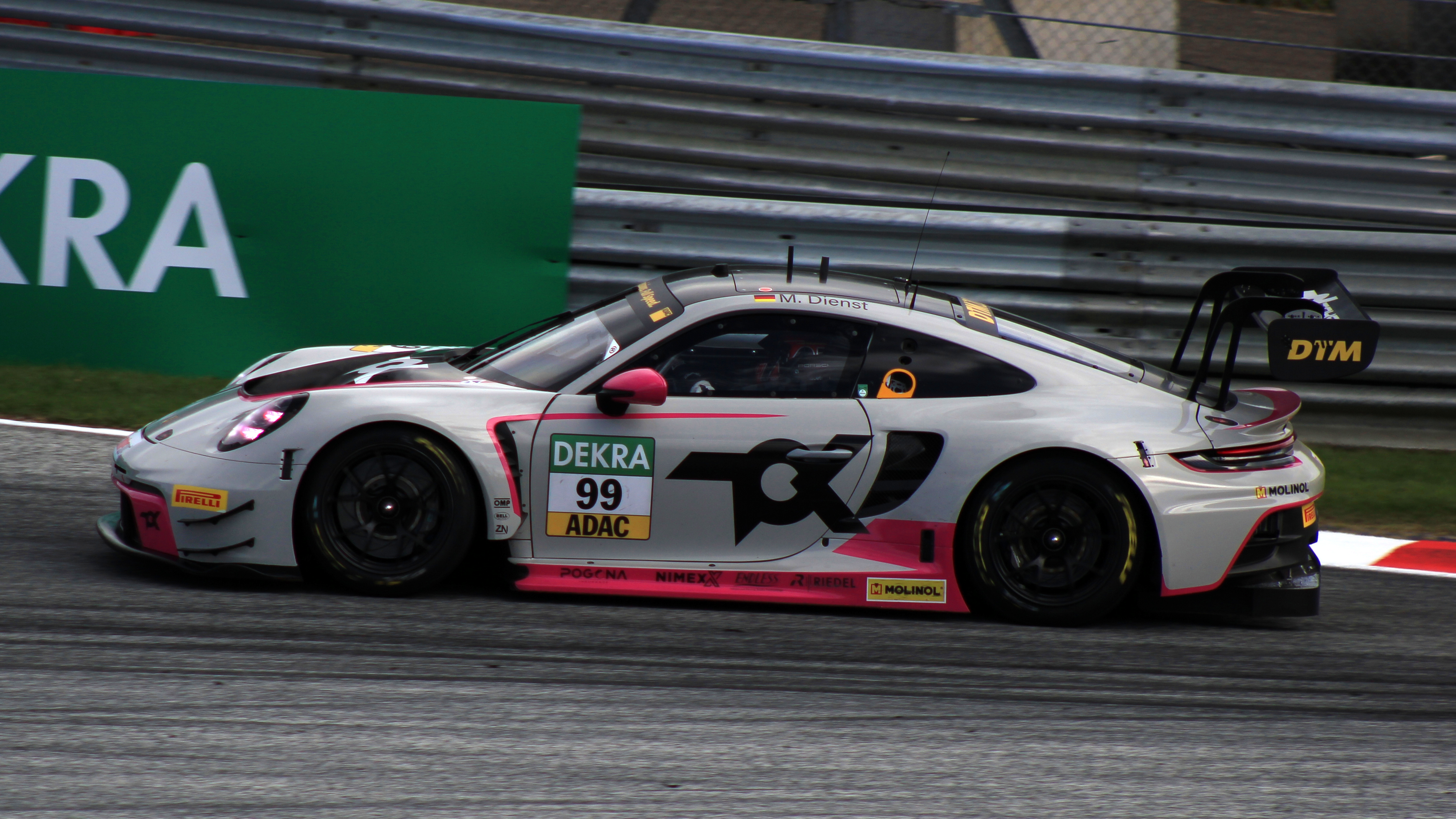
- Founded: 2002; 24 years ago
- Team principal(s): Serkan Duru
- Current series: WRC-2; Prototype Cup Germany; GT World Challenge Europe Endurance Cup
- Former series: 24H Series; ADAC GT Masters; Deutsche Tourenwagen Masters; ERC; GT World Challenge Europe Sprint Cup; TCR Italy Touring Car Championship; Nürburgring Langstrecken Serie
- Teams' Championships: 2020 World Rally Championship-2; 2022 World Rally Championship-2; 2023 World Rally Championship-2; 2021 European Rally Championship

Toksport WRT
- Full name: Toksport WRT
- Base: Nürburgring, Germany
- Team principal(s): Serkan Duru
- Drivers: (Paraguay) Fabrizio Zaldivar (Estonia) Robert Virves
- Co-drivers: (Italy) Marcelo Der Ohannesian (Estonia) Jakko Viilo
- Chassis: Škoda Fabia RS Rally2
- Tyres: Hankook

World Rally Championship history
- Manufacturers' Championships: 3 (WRC-2) (2020, 2022, 2023)
- Drivers' Championships: 3 (WRC-2) (2021, 2022, 2023)
- Rally wins: 22 (WRC-2)

Toksport WRT is a motorsport preparation and race team based at the Nürburgring in Quiddelbach, Germany. The team has prepared cars for, and entered events in 26 motorsport championships around the globe and has won notable FIA championships in European Rally Championship, World Rally Championship and Cross Country Rally World Cup as well as entering WTCC and GT series. The company that owns the team, DBO Motor Sport GmbH, was founded in 2002.

== History ==
=== 2019 ===
In 2019, their car propelled Chris Ingram and Ross Whittock to the European Rally Championship driver and co-driver titles. The team finished just 3 points behind champions Saintéloc Junior Team.

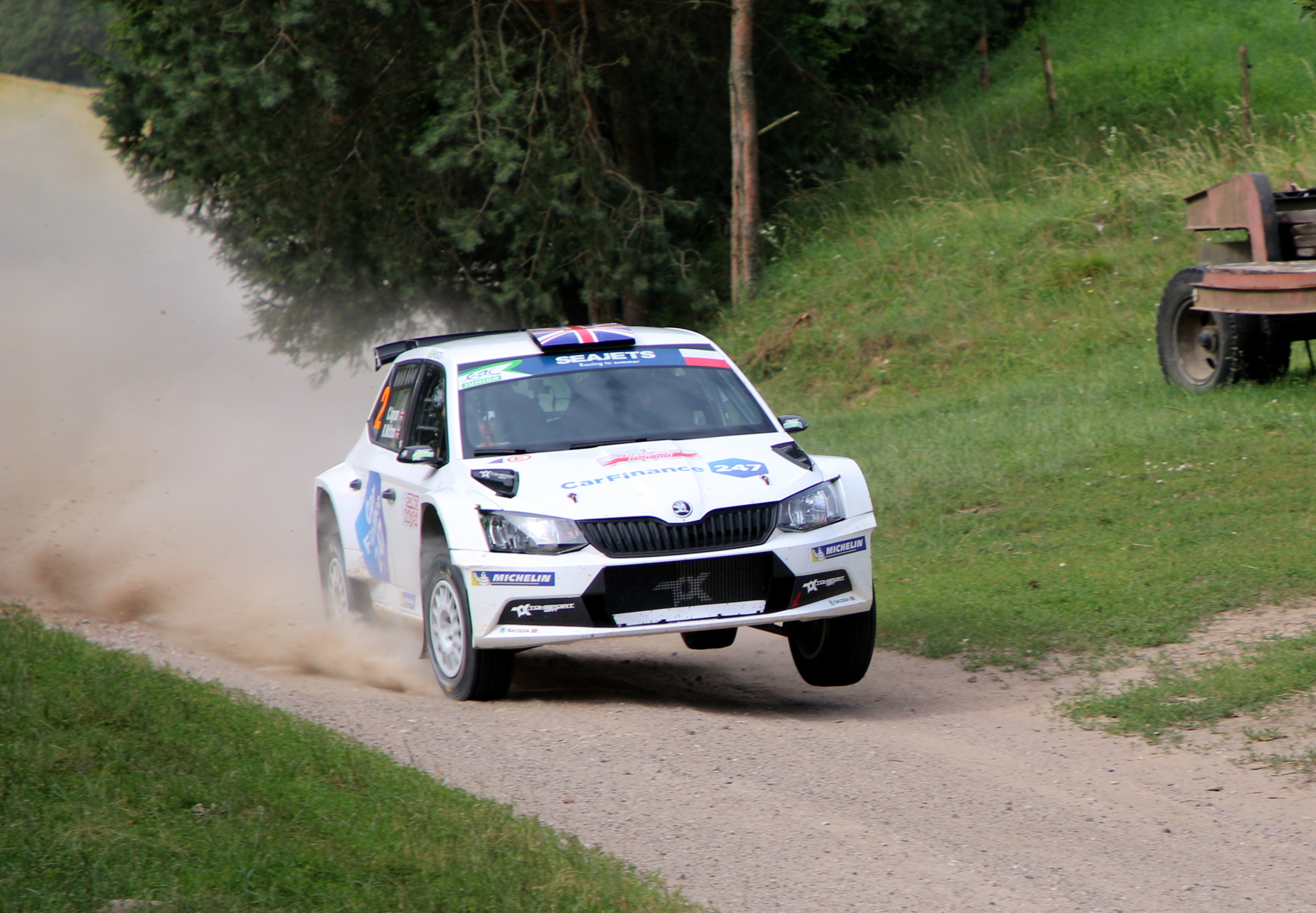
Chris Ingram at the 2019 Rally Poland.

=== 2020 ===
Toksport WRT joined the World Rally Championship-2 full-time in 2020, fielding two Škoda Fabia R5 Evo's throughout the season. Pontus Tidemand and Patrik Barth drove for the team starting from Rally Sweden. The pair finished on the podium in each of the six events they took part in, achieving three victories. They finished the season second in the standings with 108 points. Eyvind Brynildsen, co-driven by Ilka Minor, joined the team in Estonia, finishing on the podium twice in three rounds. Jan Kopecký and Jan Hloušek replaced Brynildsen for the final rally of the season, Rally Monza, in which they came third. The team finished the season in first place and won the Teams' Championship, beating PH Sport by 35 points.

In the European Rally Championship Toksport scaled back its involvement. The team did not enter in the main category, and instead fielded two Renault Clio RSR Rally5's in ERC-3 in the last two rallies of the season. Ola Nore Jr. and Rachele Somaschini competed in the Rally Hungary, while 2019 ERC Champion Chris Ingram returned to the series in the Rally Islas Canarias, driving alongside Nore.

== Results ==
=== WRC-2 results ===
Year	Entrant	Car	Driver	1	2	3	4	5	6	7	8	9	10	11	12	13	14	Drivers	Points	Teams	Points
2016	(Germany) Toksport WRT	Ford Fiesta R5	(Finland) Janne Tuohino	MON	SWE	MEX	ARG	POR	ITA	POL	FIN; 11	GER	CHN; C	FRA	ESP	GBR	AUS	NC	0	23rd	6
2017	(Germany) Toksport WRT	Škoda Fabia R5	(Turkey) Orhan Avcioglu	MON	SWE	MEX	FRA	ARG	POR	ITA	POL	FIN	GER	ESP; 8	GBR	AUS		36th	4	19th	8
2018	(Germany) Toksport WRT	Škoda Fabia R5	(Finland) Janne Tuohino	MON	SWE; 5	MEX	FRA	ARG	POR	ITA	FIN	GER	TUR	GBR	ESP	AUS		32nd	10	10th	49
2018	(Germany) Toksport WRT	Škoda Fabia R5	(Finland) Jarmo Berg	MON	SWE; 10	MEX	FRA	ARG	POR	ITA	FIN	GER	TUR	GBR	ESP	AUS		42nd	1	10th	49
2018	(Germany) Toksport WRT	Škoda Fabia R5	(United Kingdom) Chris Ingram	MON	SWE	MEX	FRA	ARG	POR	ITA	FIN	GER	TUR; 3	GBR; 12	ESP	AUS		24th	15	10th	49
2018	(Germany) Toksport WRT	Škoda Fabia R5	(Norway) Henning Solberg	MON	SWE	MEX	FRA	ARG	POR	ITA	FIN	GER	TUR	GBR	ESP; 6	AUS		35th	8	10th	49
2018	(Germany) Toksport WRT	Škoda Fabia R5	(United Kingdom) Rhys Yates	MON	SWE	MEX	FRA	ARG	POR	ITA	FIN	GER	TUR	GBR	ESP; 13	AUS		NC	0	10th	49
2020	(Germany) Toksport WRT	Škoda Fabia R5 evo	(Sweden) Pontus Tidemand	MON	SWE; 3	MEX; 1	EST; 3	TUR; 1	ITA; 1	MNZ; 2								2nd	108	1st	147
2020	(Germany) Toksport WRT	Škoda Fabia R5 evo	(Norway) Eyvind Brynildsen	MON	SWE	MEX	EST; 4	TUR; 3	ITA; 3	MNZ								6th	42	1st	147
2020	(Germany) Toksport WRT	Škoda Fabia R5 evo	(Czech Republic) Jan Kopecký	MON	SWE	MEX	EST	TUR	ITA	MNZ; 3								8th	15	1st	147
2021	(Germany) Toksport WRT	Škoda Fabia Rally2 evo	(Norway) Andreas Mikkelsen	MON; 1	ARC; 2	CRO; 5	POR; WD	ITA; Ret	SAF; WD	EST; 1	BEL	GRE; 1	FIN	ESP	MNZ; 2			1st	149	2nd	216
2021	(Germany) Toksport WRT	Škoda Fabia Rally2 evo	(Bolivia) Marco Bulacia	MON; 4	ARC	CRO; 3	POR; 6	ITA; 3	SAF; WD	EST; 3	BEL	GRE; 2	FIN	ESP	MNZ; 4			4th	107	2nd	216
2021	(Germany) Toksport WRT	Škoda Fabia Rally2 evo	(Norway) Eyvind Brynildsen	MON	ARC; 4	CRO	POR	ITA	SAF	EST	BEL	GRE	FIN	ESP	MNZ			16th	12	2nd	216
2022	(Germany) Toksport WRT	Škoda Fabia Rally2 evo	(Norway) Andreas Mikkelsen	MON; 1	SWE; 1	CRO	POR; Ret	ITA; Ret	KEN	EST; 1	FIN	BEL; 2	GRE; 7	NZL	ESP	JPN		2nd	109	1st	188
2022	(Germany) Toksport WRT	Škoda Fabia Rally2 evo	(Bolivia) Marco Bulacia	MON; Ret	SWE; 15	CRO	POR; Ret	ITA; 19	KEN	EST; Ret	FIN	BEL; 11	GRE	NZL	ESP	JPN		NC	0	1st	188
2022	(Germany) Toksport WRT	Škoda Fabia Rally2 evo	(Norway) Eyvind Brynildsen	MON	SWE	CRO	POR	ITA	KEN	EST	FIN	BEL	GRE; 4	NZL	ESP	JPN		31st	12	1st	188
2022	(Germany) Toksport WRT	Škoda Fabia Rally2 evo	(Finland) Sami Pajari	MON	SWE	CRO	POR	ITA	KEN	EST	FIN	BEL	GRE	NZL	ESP	JPN; 5		14th	10 (30) (Note: Non-bracketed number refers to the number accumulated with team, with number in brackets referring to the total accumulated for the season.)	1st	188
2022	(Germany) Toksport WRT	Škoda Fabia Rally2 evo	(Finland) Emil Lindholm													JPN; 3		1st	116	1st	188
2022	(Germany) Toksport WRT 2	Škoda Fabia Rally2 evo	(Finland) Emil Lindholm	MON	SWE; 14	CRO; 3	POR	ITA	KEN	EST; 3	FIN; 1	BEL	GRE; 1	NZL	ESP; 4			1st	116	3rd	156
2022	(Germany) Toksport WRT 2	Škoda Fabia Rally2 evo	Nikolay Gryazin	MON; 3	SWE; Ret	CRO; 4	POR; NC	ITA; 1	KEN	EST; WD	FIN; DNS	BEL; NC	GRE; 2	NZL	ESP; 3	JPN		5th	85	3rd	156
2022	(Germany) Toksport WRT 2	Škoda Fabia Rally2 evo	(Bolivia) Bruno Bulacia	MON	SWE	CRO	POR	ITA	KEN	EST	FIN	BEL	GRE	NZL	ESP	JPN; 11		52nd	0 (2)	3rd	156
2022	(Germany) Toksport WRT 2	Škoda Fabia Rally2 evo	(Italy) Mauro Miele	MON	SWE	CRO	POR	ITA	KEN	EST	FIN	BEL	GRE	NZL	ESP	JPN; 7		28th	9 (14)	3rd	156
2023	(Germany) Toksport WRT	Škoda Fabia RS Rally2	(Bolivia) Marco Bulacia	MON	SWE	MEX	CRO	POR	ITA	KEN	EST; 4	FIN; Ret	GRE; 12	CHL; Ret	EUR	JPN		14th	12 (36)	3rd	135
2023	(Germany) Toksport WRT	Škoda Fabia RS Rally2	(United Kingdom) Gus Greensmith	MON	SWE	MEX	CRO	POR	ITA	KEN	EST	FIN	GRE	CHL; 2	EUR	JPN		2nd	19 (111)	3rd	135
2023	(Germany) Toksport WRT	Škoda Fabia RS Rally2	(Finland) Emil Lindholm	MON	SWE; 7	MEX	CRO; 3	POR	ITA	KEN	EST	FIN	GRE	CHL	EUR	JPN		9th	24 (62)	3rd	135
2023	(Germany) Toksport WRT	Škoda Fabia RS Rally2	(Finland) Sami Pajari	MON; DNS	SWE; 3	MEX	CRO; 5	POR	ITA; 19	KEN	EST; 2	FIN	GRE	CHL	EUR	JPN		7th	46 (86)	3rd	135
2023	(Germany) Toksport WRT 2	Škoda Fabia RS Rally2	(Bolivia) Marco Bulacia	MON; 7	SWE; 5	MEX	CRO	POR; 6	ITA	KEN	EST	FIN	GRE	CHL	EUR	JPN		14th	24 (36)	2nd	188
2023	(Germany) Toksport WRT 2	Škoda Fabia RS Rally2	Nikolay Gryazin	MON; 2	SWE; NC	MEX	CRO; 2	POR; NC	ITA; 21	KEN	EST	FIN; 3	GRE; NC	CHL; 5	EUR; 6	JPN		4th	75 (96)	2nd	188
2023	(Germany) Toksport WRT 2	Škoda Fabia RS Rally2	(United Kingdom) Gus Greensmith	MON	SWE	MEX	CRO; 6	POR	ITA	KEN	EST	FIN	GRE	CHL	EUR	JPN		2nd	11 (111)	2nd	188
2023	(Germany) Toksport WRT 2	Škoda Fabia RS Rally2	(Finland) Sami Pajari	MON	SWE	MEX	CRO	POR	ITA	KEN	EST	FIN; 1	GRE; Ret	CHL; 3	EUR; NC	JPN		7th	40 (86)	2nd	188
2023	(Germany) Toksport WRT 2	Škoda Fabia Rally2 evo	Nikolay Gryazin	MON	SWE	MEX; Ret	CRO	POR	ITA	KEN	EST	FIN	GRE	CHL	EUR	JPN		4th	0 (96)	2nd	188
2023	(Germany) Toksport WRT 2	Škoda Fabia Rally2 evo	(Finland) Emil Lindholm	MON	SWE	MEX; 2	CRO	POR	ITA	KEN	EST	FIN	GRE	CHL	EUR	JPN		9th	20 (62)	2nd	188
2023	(Germany) Toksport WRT 3	Škoda Fabia RS Rally2	(United Kingdom) Gus Greensmith	MON	SWE	MEX	CRO	POR; 1	ITA	KEN	EST; Ret	FIN; Ret	GRE; 2	CHL	EUR; 4	JPN		2nd	81 (111)	1st	207
2023	(Germany) Toksport WRT 3	Škoda Fabia RS Rally2	(Norway) Andreas Mikkelsen	MON	SWE	MEX	CRO	POR; 3	ITA; 1	KEN	EST; 1	FIN; 4	GRE; 1	CHL	EUR; 13	JPN; 1		1st	134	1st	207
2023	(Germany) Toksport WRT 3	Škoda Fabia RS Rally2	Nikolay Gryazin	MON	SWE	MEX	CRO	POR	ITA	KEN	EST	FIN	GRE	CHL	EUR	JPN; 2		4th	21 (96)	1st	207
2024	(Germany) Toksport WRT	Škoda Fabia RS Rally2	(Norway) Eyvind Brynildsen	MON	SWE	KEN	CRO; 5	POR	ITA	POL	LAT	FIN	GRE	CHL	EUR	JPN		27th	10	2nd	205
2024	(Germany) Toksport WRT	Škoda Fabia RS Rally2	(United Kingdom) Gus Greensmith	MON	SWE	KEN; 1	CRO; NC	POR; Ret	ITA	POL; 9	LAT; NC	FIN; Ret	GRE; Ret	CHL; 3	EUR	JPN; 4		7th	54	2nd	205
2024	(Germany) Toksport WRT	Škoda Fabia RS Rally2	(France) Pierre-Louis Loubet	MON	SWE	KEN	CRO	POR; Ret	ITA; Ret	POL	LAT	FIN	GRE	CHL	EUR	JPN		24th	0 (10)	2nd	205
2024	(Germany) Toksport WRT	Škoda Fabia RS Rally2	(Republic of Ireland) Josh McErlean	MON	SWE	KEN	CRO	POR	ITA; 8	POL	LAT	FIN	GRE	CHL	EUR	JPN		9th	4 (50)	2nd	205
2024	(Germany) Toksport WRT	Škoda Fabia RS Rally2	(Sweden) Oliver Solberg	MON; NC	SWE; 1	KEN; 2	CRO	POR	ITA; DNS	POL; 2	LAT; 1	FIN; 1	GRE	CHL; 4	EUR; NC	JPN		2nd	123	2nd	205
2024	(Germany) Toksport WRT	Škoda Fabia Rally2 evo	(Turkey) Burcu Çetinkaya	MON	SWE	KEN	CRO	POR	ITA	POL	LAT	FIN	GRE; 43	CHL	EUR	JPN		NC	0	2nd	205
2024	(Germany) Toksport WRT 2	Škoda Fabia RS Rally2	(France) Pierre-Louis Loubet	MON	SWE	KEN	CRO	POR	ITA	POL; 5	LAT	FIN; Ret	GRE; Ret	CHL	EUR	JPN		24th	10 (10)	3rd	145
2024	(Germany) Toksport WRT 2	Škoda Fabia RS Rally2	(Republic of Ireland) Josh McErlean	MON	SWE	KEN	CRO	POR	ITA	POL; Ret	LAT; 8	FIN; 6	GRE; 6	CHL	EUR; 5	JPN		9th	46 (50)	3rd	145
2025	(Germany) Toksport WRT	Škoda Fabia RS Rally2	(Paraguay) Fabrizio Zaldivar	MON	SWE; 6	KEN; 3	ESP	POR	ITA	GRE	EST	FIN	PAR	CHL	EUR	JPN	SAU	13th*	23*	NC	0
2025	(Germany) Toksport WRT	Škoda Fabia RS Rally2	(Estonia) Robert Virves	MON	SWE	KEN	ESP	POR; Ret	ITA; 7	GRE; 8	EST; 1	FIN; 3	PAR; 5	CHL	EUR	JPN	SAU	4th*	60*	NC	0

* Season still in progress.

=== ERC results ===
Year	Entrant	Car	Driver	1	2	3	4	5	6	7	8	Drivers	Points	Teams	Points
2019	(Germany) Toksport WRT	Škoda Fabia R5	(United Kingdom) Chris Ingram	AZO; 3	CAN; 2	LIE; 4	POL; Ret	RMC; 6	CZE; 3	CYP; 2		1st	141	2nd	159
2019	(Germany) Toksport WRT	Škoda Fabia R5 evo	(United Kingdom) Chris Ingram								HUN; 4	1st	141	2nd	159
2019	(Germany) Toksport WRT	Škoda Fabia R5	(Cyprus) Alex Tsouloftas	AZO; 7	CAN; 14	LIE; 11	POL	RMC	CZE	CYP	HUN	31st	7	2nd	159
2019	(Germany) Toksport WRT	Škoda Fabia R5	(Norway) Eyvind Brynildsen	AZO	CAN	LIE; 9	POL	RMC	CZE	CYP	HUN	40th	5	2nd	159
2019	(Germany) Toksport WRT	Škoda Fabia R5	(Saudi Arabia) Rakan Al-Rashed	AZO	CAN	LIE	POL	RMC	CZE	CYP; Ret	HUN	NC	0	2nd	159
2019	(Germany) Toksport WRT	Škoda Fabia R5 evo	(Chile) Emilio Fernández	AZO	CAN	LIE	POL	RMC	CZE	CYP; 7	HUN	34th	7	2nd	159
2019	(Germany) Toksport WRT	Peugeot 208 R2	(Turkey) Orhan Avcioğlu	AZO	CAN	LIE	POL	RMC; 24	CZE; 21	CYP; 16	HUN; 15	NC	0	2nd	159
2019	(Germany) Toksport WRT	Peugeot 208 R2	(Belgium) Amaury Molle	AZO	CAN	LIE	POL	RMC	CZE; Ret	CYP	HUN	NC	0	2nd	159
2019	(Germany) Toksport WRT	Peugeot 208 R2	(Germany) Marijan Griebel	AZO	CAN	LIE	POL	RMC	CZE	CYP	HUN; 11	–	–	2nd	159
2020	(Germany) Toksport WRT	Renault Clio RSR Rally5	(Italy) Rachele Somaschini	ITA	LAT	PRT	HUN; Ret	ESP				NC	0	6th	75
2020	(Germany) Toksport WRT	Renault Clio RSR Rally5	(Norway) Ola Nore Jr.	ITA	LAT	PRT	HUN; 23	ESP; 31				NC	0	6th	75
2020	(Germany) Toksport WRT	Renault Clio RSR Rally5	(United Kingdom) Chris Ingram	ITA	LAT	PRT	HUN	ESP; 28				NC	0	6th	75
2021	(Germany) Toksport WRT	Škoda Fabia Rally2 evo	(Norway) Andreas Mikkelsen	POL; 2	LAT; 5	ITA; 8	CZE; 2	PRT1; 1	PRT2; 1	HUN; 6	ESP	1st	191	1st	411
2021	(Germany) Toksport WRT	Škoda Fabia Rally2 evo	(Chile) Emilio Fernández	POL; 11	LAT; 9	ITA	CZE	PRT1	PRT2	HUN	ESP	25th	16	1st	411
2021	(Germany) Toksport WRT	Renault Clio Rally4	(Norway) Ola Nore Jr.	POL; Ret	LAT; Ret	ITA; DNS	CZE; DNS	PRT1; DNS	PRT2; WD	HUN; WD	ESP	NC	0	1st	411
2021	(Germany) Toksport WRT	Renault Clio Rally4	(France) Jean-Baptiste Franceschi	POL; Ret	LAT; 27	ITA; 31	CZE; 19	PRT1; 16	PRT2; 19	HUN; 13	ESP; 19	54th	3	1st	411
2021	(Germany) Toksport WRT	Renault Clio Rally4	(Hungary) Patrik Herczig	POL	LAT	ITA	CZE	PRT1	PRT2	HUN; Ret	ESP	NC	0	1st	411
2021	(Germany) Toksport WRT	Renault Clio Rally4	(Argentina) Paulo Soria	POL	LAT	ITA	CZE	PRT1	PRT2	HUN	ESP; 25	NC	0	1st	411
2021	(Germany) Toksport WRT	Renault Clio RSR Rally5	(Turkey) Çelik Çağlayan	POL	LAT	ITA	CZE	PRT1	PRT2; WD	HUN	ESP	–	–	1st	411
2022	(Germany) Toksport WRT	Škoda Fabia Rally2 evo	(Latvia) Nikolay Gryazin	PRT1; WD	PRT2	ESP	POL	LAT	ITA	CZE	ESP2	–	–	2nd	123
2022	(Germany) Toksport WRT	Renault Clio Rally4	(France) Anthony Fotia	PRT1; Ret	PRT2; 21	ESP; 16	POL; Ret	LAT; 22	ITA	CZE	ESP2	NC	0	2nd	123
2022	(Germany) Toksport WRT	Renault Clio Rally4	(Italy) Andrea Mabellini	PRT1; 20	PRT2; 22	ESP1; 17	POL; Ret	LAT; 25	ITA; 19	CZE; 12	ESP2; 9	36th	13	2nd	123
2023	(Germany) Toksport WRT	Volkswagen Polo GTI R5	(Sweden) Oliver Solberg	PRT	ESP	POL	LAT	SWE; 1	ITA	CZE	HUN	15th	33	NC	0

=== Deutsche Tourenwagen Masters results ===
Year	Car	Drivers	Races	Wins	Poles	F/Laps	Podiums	Points	D.C.	T.C.
2023	Porsche 911 GT3 R (992)	(Germany) Christian Engelhart*	9	1	0	0	2	54	17th	10th
2023	Porsche 911 GT3 R (992)	(Germany) Tim Heinemann	18	0	0	0	2	50	18th	10th
2023	Porsche 911 GT3 R (992)	(Germany) Marvin Dienst	8	0	0	0	0	11	27th	10th

* Engelhart drove for GRT Grasser Racing Team in round 8.
