= Diego Vallejo =

Spanish rally co-driver (born 1973)

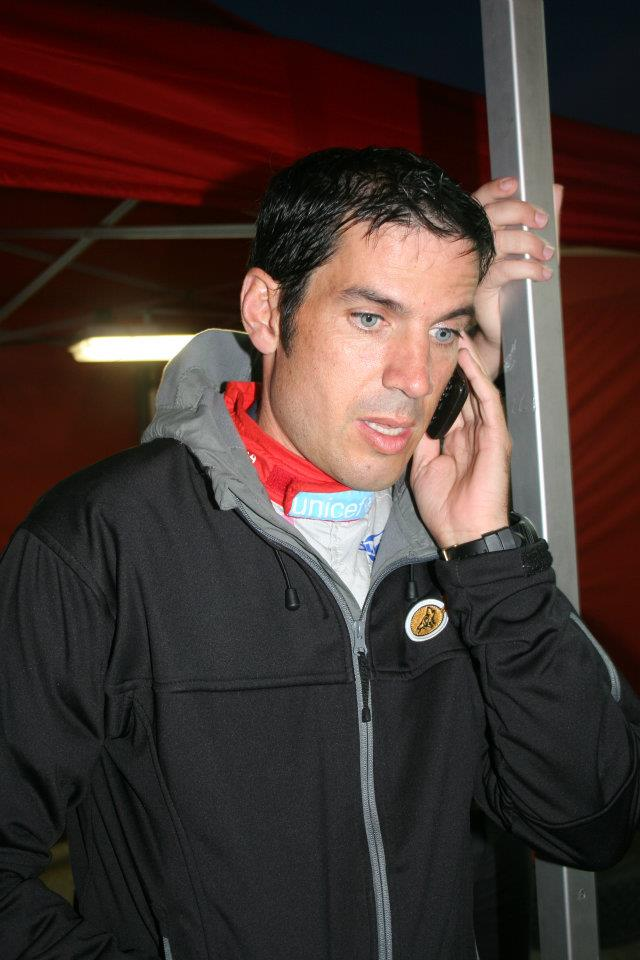

Personal information
- Nationality: (Spain) Spanish
- Full name: Diego Vallejo Folgueira
- Born: February 13, 1973 (age 53); Meira, Lugo, Spain

World Rally Championship record
- Years active: 1993, 1995–1996, 1999–2002, 2008, 2010–2012, 2021–present
- Teams: Citroën
- Rallies: 36
- Championships: 0
- Rally wins: 0
- Podiums: 3
- Stage wins: 15
- First rally: 1993 Rally Catalunya
- Last rally: 2022 Rally Estonia

Diego Vallejo Folgueira (born 13 February 1973) is a Spanish rally co-driver. He won the Spanish Rally Championship with his brother Sergio Vallejo twice, in 2009 and 2014. In 2010, he co-drove with Dani Sordo for the Citroën World Rally Team, winning the Monza Rally Show. He also co-drove for the privateer Albert Llovera in 2010, as well in 2011 and 2012.

== WRC results ==
| Season | Driver | Car | 1 | 2 | 3 | 4 | 5 | 6 | Pos. | Points |
|---|---|---|---|---|---|---|---|---|---|---|
| 2008 | Albert Llovera | Fiat Grande Punto S2000 | ESP; Ret | | | | | | – | 0 |
| 2010 | Dani Sordo | Citroën C4 WRC | GER; 2 | JAP; 4 | FRA; 2 | ESP; 3 | GBR; 5 | | 8º | 73 |
| 2011 | Albert Llovera | Fiat Grande Punto S2000 | JOR; 17 | ITA; Ret | GRE; 24 | FIN; Ret | FRA; DNS | ESP; 40 | – | 0 |
