= Egon Kaur =

Estonian rally driver (born 1987)

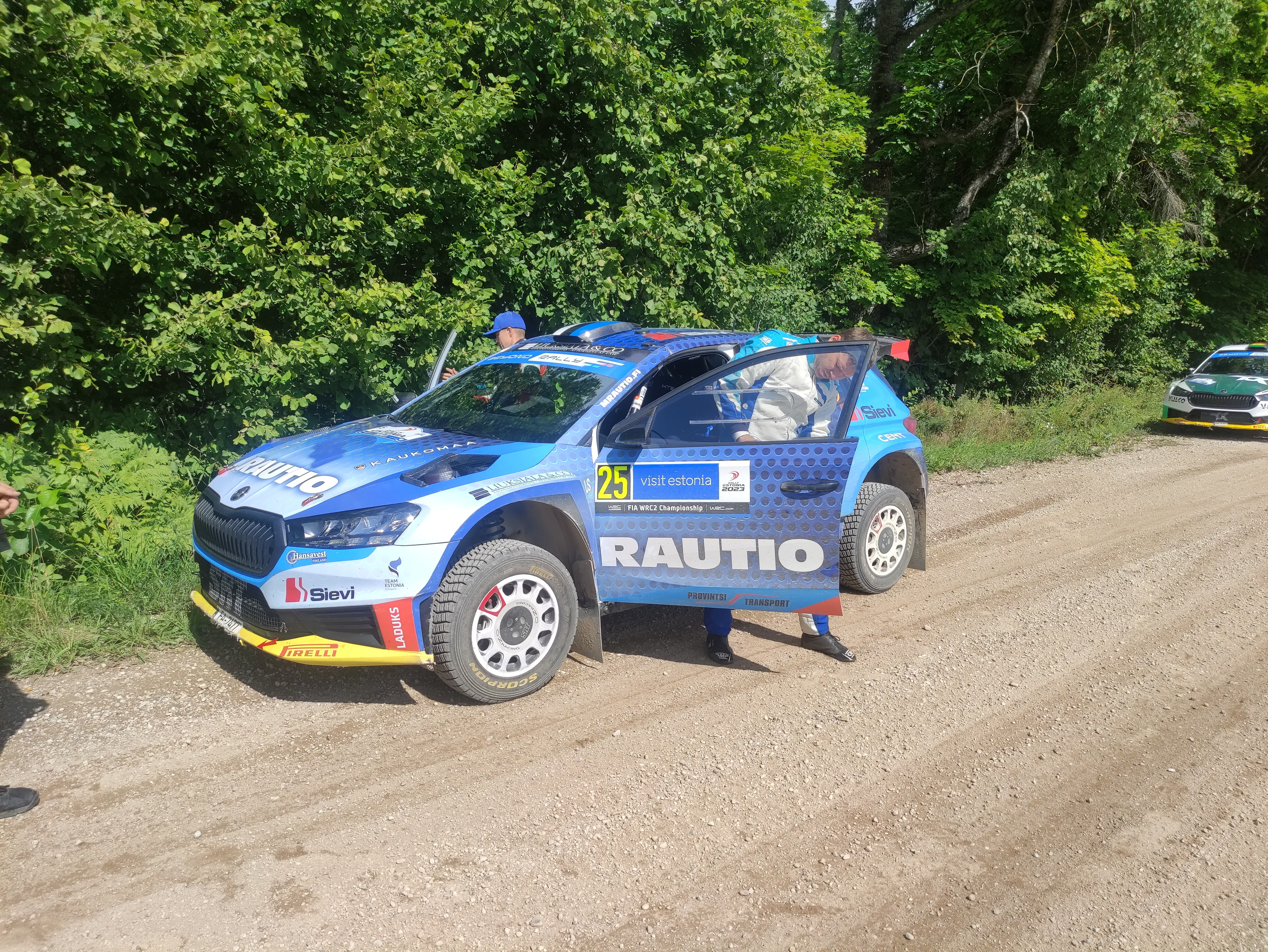
- Egon Kaur in 2023 Rally Estonia

Personal information
- Nationality: (Estonia) Estonian
- Born: 20 August 1987 (age 39); Pärnu, then part of Estonian SSR, Soviet Union

World Rally Championship record
- Years active: 2006, 2008–2009, 2011, 2014, 2020–
- Co-driver: (Estonia) Avo Kristov (Estonia) Simo Koskinen (Estonia) Erik Lepikson (Estonia) Mait Laidvee (Estonia) Silver Simm (Estonia) Jakko Viilo
- Rallies: 22
- Championships: 0
- Rally wins: 0
- Podiums: 0
- Stage wins: 0
- Total points: 2
- First rally: (United Kingdom) 2006 Wales Rally GB
- Last rally: 2023 Rally Estonia
- Last updated on: 27 July 2023.

Egon Kaur (born 20 August 1987) is an Estonian rally driver.

== Career ==
Kaur started rallying in 2004, and made his World Rally Championship debut on the 2006 Wales Rally GB in a Renault Clio. His next WRC appearances came in the 2008 season in Sweden and Wales, behind the wheel of a Subaru Impreza WRX STi. He contested Wales Rally GB again at the end of 2009.

After winning the Estonian Group N title in 2010, Kaur contested the new WRC Academy class in 2011. He won the first three rounds of the season in Portugal, Sardinia and Finland. Kaur narrowly missed winning the 2011 FIA WRC Academy title to Craig Breen, with equal championship points but fewer fastest stage times.

In February 2011, Kaur was one of 12 drivers selected for the first FIA Institute Young Driver Excellence Academy.

In 2012, Kaur started to use the experience gained from the academies to manage a similar program named "EAL Akadeemia" for young Estonian drivers.

Kaur's main sponsors throughout the years have been Estonian based companies Provintsi Transport, Gustaf Tallinn and DS Seaways (former Baltic Scandinavian Lines).

In 2013, Kaur continued to drive in local Estonian championship and run his Kaur Motorsport rallyschool.

== Results ==
=== WRC results ===
Year	Entrant	Car	1	2	3	4	5	6	7	8	9	10	11	12	13	14	15	16	WDC	Points
2006	Egon Kaur	Renault Clio RS	MON	SWE	MEX	ESP	FRA	ARG	ITA	GRE	GER	FIN	JPN	CYP	TUR	AUS	NZL	GBR; Ret	NC	0
2008	Egon Kaur	Subaru Impreza WRX STi	MON	SWE; 38	MEX	ARG	JOR	ITA	GRE	TUR	FIN	GER	NZL	ESP	FRA	JPN			NC	0
2008	World Rally Team Estonia	Subaru Impreza WRX STi															GBR; Ret		NC	0
2009	Egon Kaur	Subaru Impreza WRX STi	IRE	NOR	CYP	POR	ARG	ITA	GRE	POL	FIN	AUS	ESP	GBR; 27					NC	0
2014	Kaur Motorsport	Ford Fiesta R5	MON	SWE	MEX	POR	ARG	ITA; Ret	POL	FIN	GER	AUS	FRA	ESP	GBR				NC	0
2020	Kaur Motorsport	Škoda Fabia R5 Evo	MON	SWE	MEX	EST; 12	TUR	ITA	MNZ										NC	0
2021	Kaur Motorsport	Volkswagen Polo GTI R5	MON	ARC; 14	CRO	POR; Ret	ITA; 38	KEN	EST; 33	BEL	GRE	FIN; 18	ESP	MNZ					NC	0
2022	Egon Kaur	Volkswagen Polo GTI R5	MON	SWE; 10	CRO	POR	ITA	KEN	EST; 25	FIN; 10	BEL	GRE	NZL	ESP	JPN				34th	2
2023	Egon Kaur	Škoda Fabia Rally2 evo	MON	SWE; 20	MEX	CRO	POR	ITA	KEN										NC	0
2023	Egon Kaur	Škoda Fabia RS Rally2								EST; 15	FIN	GRE	CHL	EUR	JPN				NC	0
2025	Egon Kaur	Škoda Fabia RS Rally2	MON	SWE	KEN	ESP	POR	ITA	GRE	EST	FIN	PAR	CHL	EUR	JPN	SAU			NC*	0*

=== WRC-2 results ===
Year	Entrant	Car	1	2	3	4	5	6	7	8	9	10	11	12	13	WDC	Points
2014	Kaur Motorsport	Ford Fiesta R5	MON	SWE	MEX	POR	ARG	ITA; Ret	POL	FIN	GER	AUS	FRA	ESP	GBR	NC	0
2022	Egon Kaur	Volkswagen Polo GTI R5	MON	SWE; 4	CRO	POR	ITA	KEN	EST; 12	FIN; 2	BEL	GRE	NZL	ESP	JPN	13th	30
2023	Egon Kaur	Škoda Fabia Rally2 evo	MON	SWE; 11	MEX	CRO	POR	ITA	KEN							28th	6
2023	Egon Kaur	Škoda Fabia RS Rally2								EST; 7	FIN	GRE	CHL	EUR	JPN	28th	6

=== WRC-3 results ===
Year	Entrant	Car	1	2	3	4	5	6	7	8	9	10	11	12	Pos.	Points
2020	Kaur Motorsport	Škoda Fabia R5 Evo	MON	SWE	MEX	EST; 3	TUR	ITA	MNZ						15th	15
2021	Kaur Motorsport	Volkswagen Polo GTI R5	MON	ARC; 2	CRO	POR; Ret	ITA; 12	KEN	EST; 10	BEL	GRE	FIN; 6	ESP	MNZ	10th	45

=== PWRC results ===
Year	Entrant	Car	1	2	3	4	5	6	7	8	9	10	11	12	13	14	15	Pos.	Points
2008	World Rally Team Estonia	Subaru Impreza WRX STi	MON	SWE	MEX	ARG	JOR	ITA	GRE	TUR	FIN	GER	NZL	ESP	FRA	JPN	GBR; Ret	NC	0

=== WRC Academy results ===
Year	Entrant	1	2	3	4	5	6	WDC	Points
2011	Playboy Estonia Rally Team	POR; 1	ITA; 1	FIN; 1	GER; 8	FRA; Ret	GBR; 2	2nd	111
