= 2021 Rally Italia Sardegna =

18th edition of Rally Italia Sardegna

2021 Rally Italia Sardegna Rally Italia Sardegna 2021
Round 5 of 12 in the 2021 World Rally Championship
← Previous event	Next event →
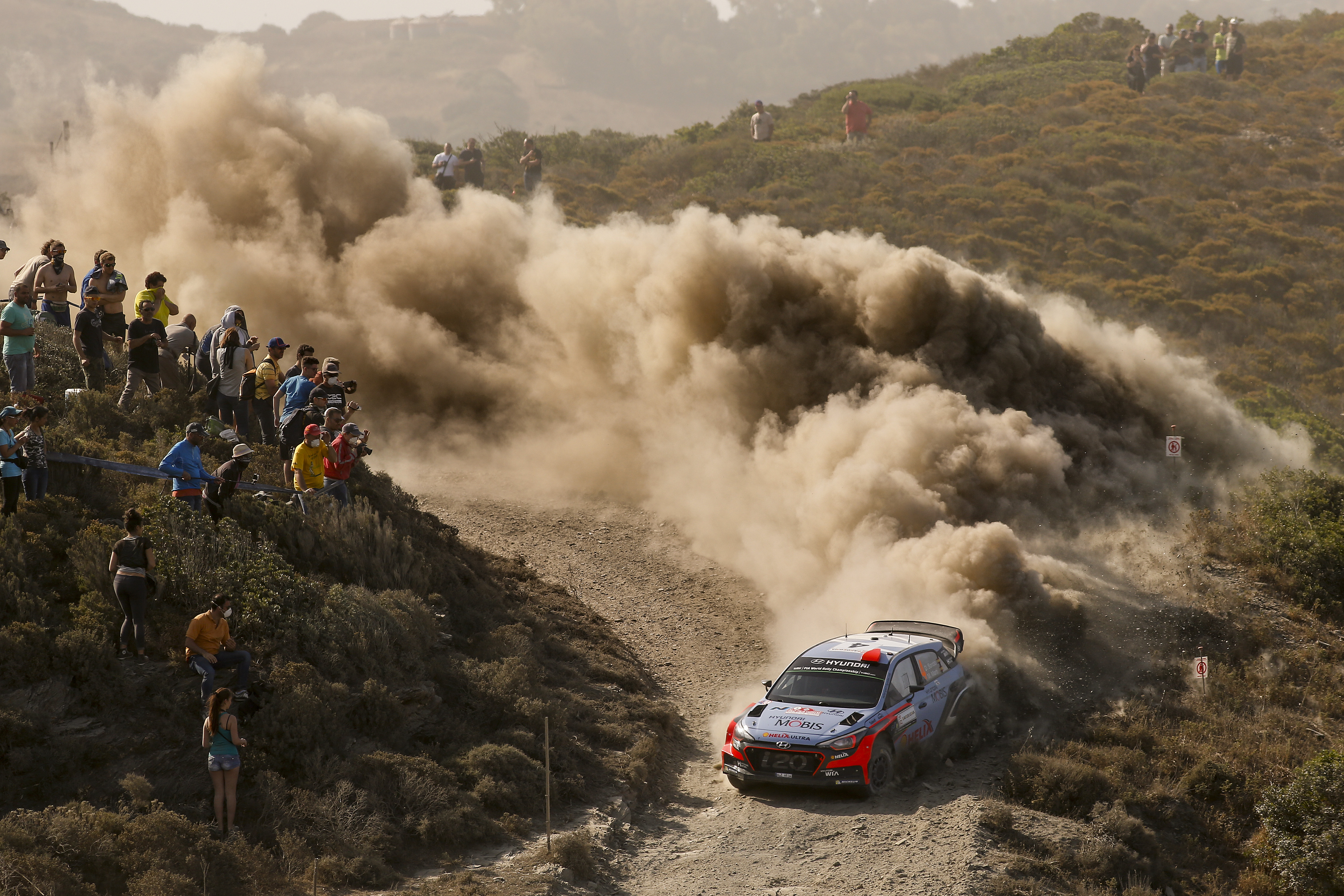
- The Sardinia Rally is known for its fast but narrow roads.
- Host country: Italy
- Rally base: Olbia, Sardinia
- Dates run: 3 – 6 June 2021
- Start location: Oschiri, Sassari
- Finish location: Santa Teresa Gallura, Sassari
- Stages: 20 (303.10 km; 188.34 miles)
- Stage surface: Gravel
- Transport distance: 995.93 km (618.84 miles)
- Overall distance: 1,514.07 km (940.80 miles)

Statistics
- Crews registered: 58
- Crews: 55 at start, 40 at finish

Overall results
- Overall winner: (France) Sébastien Ogier (France) Julien Ingrassia (Japan) Toyota Gazoo Racing WRT; 3:19:26.4
- Power Stage winner: (Belgium) Thierry Neuville (Belgium) Martijn Wydaeghe (South Korea) Hyundai Shell Mobis WRT; 5:33.4

Support category results
- WRC-2 winner: (Finland) Jari Huttunen (Finland) Mikko Lukka (South Korea) Hyundai Motorsport N 3:28:58.1
- WRC-3 winner: (France) Yohan Rossel (France) Alexandre Coria; 3:30:04.1

The 2021 Rally Italia Sardegna (also known as the Rally d'Italia Sardegna 2021) was a motor racing event for rally cars that held over four days between 3 and 6 June 2021. It marked the eighteenth running of the Rally Italia Sardegna. The event was the fifth round of the 2021 World Rally Championship, World Rally Championship-2 and World Rally Championship-3. The 2021 event was based in Olbia in Sardinia and contested over twenty special stages totalling 303.10 km (188.34 mi) in competitive distance.

Dani Sordo and Carlos del Barrio were the two-time defending rally winners, but del Barrio did not defend his title with Sordo as del Barrio moved to World Rally Championship-3 to co-drive with Fabrizio Zaldívar. Pontus Tidemand and Patrick Barth were the defending winners in the WRC-2 category, but they did not defend their titles neither as they did not participate in the event. Neither did the WRC-3 title defenders Jari Huttunen and Mikko Lukka, who competed for Hyundai Motorsport in the WRC-2 class.

Sébastien Ogier and Julien Ingrassia won the rally. Their team, Toyota Gazoo Racing WRT, were the manufacturer's winners. Jari Huttunen and Mikko Lukka won the World Rally Championship-2 category, while Yohan Rossel and Alexandre Coria won the World Rally Championship-3 category.

== Background ==
=== Championship standings prior to the event ===
Reigning World Champions Sébastien Ogier and Julien Ingrassia entered the round with a two-point lead over Elfyn Evans and Scott Martin. Thierry Neuville and Martijn Wydaeghe were third, a further twenty points behind. In the World Rally Championship for Manufacturers, Toyota Gazoo Racing WRT held a thirty-seven-point lead over defending manufacturers' champions Hyundai Shell Mobis WRT, followed by M-Sport Ford WRT.

In the World Rally Championship-2 standings, Andreas Mikkelsen and Ola Fløene held a nine-point lead ahead of Esapekka Lappi and Janne Ferm in the drivers' and co-drivers' standings respectively, with Marco Bulacia Wilkinson and Marcelo Der Ohannesian in third. In the teams' championship, Movisport lead Toksport WRT by fifteen points, with M-Sport Ford WRT in third.

In the World Rally Championship-3 standings, Yohan Rossel led the drivers' championship, while Maciek Szczepaniak led the co-drivers' championship. Second and third in the driver's championship were Kajetan Kajetanowicz and Nicolas Ciamin, while co-driver's championship were Yannick Roche and Alexandre Coria.

=== Entry list ===
The following crews entered the rally. The event opened to crews competing in the World Rally Championship, its support categories, the World Rally Championship-2 and World Rally Championship-3, and privateer entries that were not registered to score points in any championship. Twelve entries for the World Rally Championship were received, as were twelve in the World Rally Championship-2 and sixteen in the World Rally Championship-3.

Rally1 entries competing in the World Rally Championship
No.	Driver	Co-Driver	Entrant	Car	Tyre
1	(France) Sébastien Ogier	(France) Julien Ingrassia	(Japan) Toyota Gazoo Racing WRT	Toyota Yaris WRC	P
2	(Sweden) Oliver Solberg	(Republic of Ireland) Aaron Johnston	(France) Hyundai 2C Competition	Hyundai i20 Coupe WRC	—N/a
3	(Finland) Teemu Suninen	(Finland) Mikko Markkula	(United Kingdom) M-Sport Ford WRT	Ford Fiesta WRC	P
6	(Spain) Dani Sordo	(Spain) Borja Rozada	(South Korea) Hyundai Shell Mobis WRT	Hyundai i20 Coupe WRC	P
7	(France) Pierre-Louis Loubet	(France) Florian Haut-Labourdette	(France) Hyundai 2C Competition	Hyundai i20 Coupe WRC	P
8	(Estonia) Ott Tänak	(Estonia) Martin Järveoja	(South Korea) Hyundai Shell Mobis WRT	Hyundai i20 Coupe WRC	P
11	(Belgium) Thierry Neuville	(Belgium) Martijn Wydaeghe	(South Korea) Hyundai Shell Mobis WRT	Hyundai i20 Coupe WRC	P
18	(Japan) Takamoto Katsuta	(United Kingdom) Daniel Barritt	(Japan) Toyota Gazoo Racing WRT	Toyota Yaris WRC	P
33	(United Kingdom) Elfyn Evans	(United Kingdom) Scott Martin	(Japan) Toyota Gazoo Racing WRT	Toyota Yaris WRC	P
44	(United Kingdom) Gus Greensmith	(United Kingdom) Stuart Loudon	(United Kingdom) M-Sport Ford WRT	Ford Fiesta WRC	P
50	(France) Cyrille Féraud	(France) Benoît Manzo	(France) Cyrille Féraud	Citroën DS3 WRC	P
69	(Finland) Kalle Rovanperä	(Finland) Jonne Halttunen	(Japan) Toyota Gazoo Racing WRT	Toyota Yaris WRC	P

Rally2 entries competing in the World Rally Championship-2
No.	Driver	Co-Driver	Entrant	Car	Tyre
20	(Norway) Andreas Mikkelsen	(Norway) Ola Fløene	(Germany) Toksport WRT	Škoda Fabia R5 Evo	P
21	(Bolivia) Marco Bulacia Wilkinson	(Argentina) Marcelo Der Ohannesian	(Germany) Toksport WRT	Škoda Fabia R5 Evo	P
22	(Norway) Mads Østberg	(Norway) Torstein Eriksen	(Hungary) TRT World Rally Team	Citroën C3 Rally2	P
23	(France) Adrien Fourmaux	(Belgium) Renaud Jamoul	(United Kingdom) M-Sport Ford WRT	Ford Fiesta R5 Mk. II	P
24	(Italy) Enrico Brazzoli	(Italy) Danilo Fappani	(Italy) Movisport	Škoda Fabia R5	P
26	(United States) Sean Johnston	(United States) Alex Kihurani	(France) Saintéloc Junior Team	Citroën C3 Rally2	P
27	(Norway) Ole Christian Veiby	(Sweden) Jonas Andersson	(South Korea) Hyundai Motorsport N	Hyundai i20 R5	—N/a
28	(Czech Republic) Martin Prokop	(Czech Republic) Zdeněk Jůrka	(United Kingdom) M-Sport Ford WRT	Ford Fiesta R5 Mk. II	P
29	(Estonia) Georg Linnamäe	(Estonia) Tanel Kasesalu	(Estonia) ALM Motorsport	Volkswagen Polo GTI R5	P
30	(Finland) Jari Huttunen	(Finland) Mikko Lukka	(South Korea) Hyundai Motorsport N	Hyundai i20 R5	P
31	(Italy) Andrea Crugnola	(Italy) Pietro Ometto	(South Korea) Hyundai Motorsport N	Hyundai i20 R5	—N/a

Rally2 entries competing in the World Rally Championship-3 (Note: Under the Sporting Regulations, each car competing in the World Rally Championship-3 is entered under the driver's name.)
No.	Driver	Co-Driver	Entrant	Car	Tyre
32	(France) Yohan Rossel	(France) Alexandre Coria	(France) Yohan Rossel	Citroën C3 Rally2	P
34	(France) Nicolas Ciamin	(France) Yannick Roche	(France) Nicolas Ciamin	Citroën C3 Rally2	P
35	(Poland) Kajetan Kajetanowicz	(Poland) Maciej Szczepaniak	(Poland) Kajetan Kajetanowicz	Škoda Fabia R5 Evo	P
36	(Estonia) Egon Kaur	(Estonia) Silver Simm	(Estonia) Kaur Motorsport	Volkswagen Polo GTI R5	P
37	(Finland) Emil Lindholm	(Finland) Reeta Hämäläinen	(Finland) Emil Lindholm	Škoda Fabia R5 Evo	P
38	(United Kingdom) Chris Ingram	(United Kingdom) Ross Whittock	(United Kingdom) Chris Ingram	Škoda Fabia R5 Evo	P
39	(Paraguay) Fabrizio Zaldívar	(Spain) Carlos del Barrio	(Paraguay) Fabrizio Zaldívar	Škoda Fabia R5 Evo	P
40	(Italy) Mauro Miele	(Italy) Luca Beltrame	(Italy) Mauro Miele	Škoda Fabia R5	P
41	(Italy) Alberto Battistolli	(Italy) Simone Scattolin	(Italy) Alberto Battistolli	Škoda Fabia R5 Evo	P
42	(Spain) Jan Solans	(Spain) Rodrigo Sanjuan de Eusebio	(Spain) Jan Solans	Citroën C3 Rally2	P
43	(Spain) Pepe López	(Spain) Diego Vallejo	(Spain) Pepe López	Škoda Fabia R5 Evo	P
45	(Chile) Alberto Heller	(Spain) Marc Martí	(Chile) Alberto Heller	Citroën C3 Rally2	P
46	(Germany) Armin Kremer	(Germany) Ella Kremer	(Germany) Armin Kremer	Volkswagen Polo GTI R5	P
47	(Chile) Emilio Fernández	(Argentina) Ruben Garcia	(Chile) Emilio Fernández	Škoda Fabia R5 Evo	P
48	(Italy) Pablo Biolghini	(Italy) Stefano Pudda	(Italy) Pablo Biolghini	Škoda Fabia R5	P
49	(Italy) Maurizio Morato	(Italy) Enrico Gallinaro	(Italy) Maurizio Morato	Škoda Fabia R5 Evo	P

Other major entries
No.	Driver	Co-Driver	Entrant	Car	Tyre
25	Nikolay Gryazin (Note: Nikolay Gryazin is Russian, but he competes as a neutral competitor using the designation RAF (Russian Automobile Federation), as the Court of Arbitration for Sport upheld a ban on Russia competing at World Championships. The ban was implemented by the World Anti-Doping Agency in response to state-sponsored doping program of Russian athletes.)	Konstantin Aleksandrov (Note: Konstantin Aleksandrov is Russian, but he competes as a neutral competitor using the designation RAF (Russian Automobile Federation), as the Court of Arbitration for Sport upheld a ban on Russia competing at World Championships. The ban was implemented by the World Anti-Doping Agency in response to state-sponsored doping program of Russian athletes.)	(Italy) Movisport	Volkswagen Polo GTI R5	P

=== Route ===
==== Itinerary ====
All dates and times are CEST (UTC+2).

Leg	Date	Time	No.	Stage name	Distance
—N/a	3 June	09:01	—	Loiri Porto San Paolo [Shakedown]	2.89 km
1	4 June	08:02	SS1	Filigosu – Sa Conchedda 1	22.29 km
1	4 June	09:02	SS2	Terranova 1	14.36 km
1	4 June	10:47	SS3	Filigosu – Sa Conchedda 2	22.29 km
1	4 June	11:47	SS4	Terranova 2	14.36 km
1	4 June	14:47	SS5	Tempio Pausania 1	12.08 km
1	4 June	15:47	SS6	Erula – Tula 1	14.97 km
1	4 June	17:32	SS7	Tempio Pausania 2	12.08 km
1	4 June	18:32	SS8	Erula – Tula 2	14.97 km
2	5 June	08:08	SS9	Coiluna – Loelle 1	15.00 km
2	5 June	09:08	SS10	Lerno – Monti di Alà 1	22.08 km
2	5 June	10:38	SS11	Coiluna – Loelle 2	15.00 km
2	5 June	11:38	SS12	Lerno – Monti di Alà 2	22.08 km
2	5 June	15:10	SS13	Bortigiadas – Aggius – Viddalba 1	14.70 km
2	5 June	16:08	SS14	Sedini – Castelsardo 1	13.03 km
2	5 June	17:32	SS15	Bortigiadas – Aggius – Viddalba 2	14.70 km
2	5 June	18:38	SS16	Sedini – Castelsardo 2	13.03 km
3	6 June	07:33	SS17	Arzachena – Braniatogghiu 1	15.25 km
3	6 June	08:38	SS18	Aglientu – Santa Teresa 1	7.79 km
3	6 June	10:09	SS19	Arzachena – Braniatogghiu 2	15.25 km
3	6 June	12:18	SS20	Aglientu – Santa Teresa 2 [Power Stage]	7.79 km

== Report ==
=== World Rally Cars ===
==== Classification ====
Position		No.	Driver	Co-driver	Entrant	Car	Time	Difference	Points	
Event	Class	No.	Driver	Co-driver	Entrant	Car	Time	Difference	Event	Stage
1	1	1	Sébastien Ogier	Julien Ingrassia	Toyota Gazoo Racing WRT	Toyota Yaris WRC	3:19:26.4	0.0	25	2
2	2	33	Elfyn Evans	Scott Martin	Toyota Gazoo Racing WRT	Toyota Yaris WRC	3:20:12.4	+46.0	18	0
3	3	11	Thierry Neuville	Martijn Wydaeghe	Hyundai Shell Mobis WRT	Hyundai i20 Coupe WRC	3:20:31.6	+1:05.2	15	5
4	4	18	Takamoto Katsuta	Daniel Barritt	Toyota Gazoo Racing WRT	Toyota Yaris WRC	3:25:37.6	+6:11.2	12	0
17	5	6	Dani Sordo	Borja Rozada	Hyundai Shell Mobis WRT	Hyundai i20 Coupe WRC	3:40:47.1	+21:20.7	0	1
24	6	8	Ott Tänak	Martin Järveoja	Hyundai Shell Mobis WRT	Hyundai i20 Coupe WRC	4:09:50.2	+50:23.8	0	4
25	7	69	Kalle Rovanperä	Jonne Halttunen	Toyota Gazoo Racing WRT	Toyota Yaris WRC	4:13:45.2	+54:18.8	0	3
26	8	44	Gus Greensmith	Stuart Loudon	M-Sport Ford WRT	Ford Fiesta WRC	4:22:04.2	+1:02:37.8	0	0
31	9	3	Teemu Suninen	Mikko Markkula	M-Sport Ford WRT	Ford Fiesta WRC	4:43:05.5	+1:23:39.1	0	0
Retired SS13		7	Pierre-Louis Loubet	Florian Haut-Labourdette	Hyundai 2C Competition	Hyundai i20 Coupe WRC	Mechanical		0	0
Retired SS9		50	Cyrille Féraud	Benoît Manzo	Cyrille Féraud	Citroën DS3 WRC	Withdrawn		0	0
Did not start		2	Oliver Solberg	Aaron Johnston	Hyundai 2C Competition	Hyundai i20 Coupe WRC	Quarantine		0	0

==== Special stages ====
Day	Stage	Stage name	Length	Winners	Car	Time	Class leaders
3 June	—	Loiri Porto San Paolo [Shakedown]	2.89 km	Neuville / Wydaeghe	Hyundai i20 Coupe WRC	1:50.7	—N/a
4 June	SS1	Filigosu – Sa Conchedda 1	22.29 km	Tänak / Järveoja	Hyundai i20 Coupe WRC	13:08.3	Tänak / Järveoja
4 June	SS2	Terranova 1	14.36 km	Tänak / Järveoja	Hyundai i20 Coupe WRC	9:15.8	Tänak / Järveoja
4 June	SS3	Filigosu – Sa Conchedda 2	22.29 km	Tänak / Järveoja	Hyundai i20 Coupe WRC	12:57.4	Tänak / Järveoja
4 June	SS4	Terranova 2	14.36 km	Tänak / Järveoja	Hyundai i20 Coupe WRC	9:05.9	Tänak / Järveoja
4 June	SS5	Tempio Pausania 1	12.08 km	Tänak / Järveoja	Hyundai i20 Coupe WRC	10:00.5	Tänak / Järveoja
4 June	SS6	Erula – Tula 1	14.97 km	Sordo / Rozada	Hyundai i20 Coupe WRC	11:23.5	Tänak / Järveoja
4 June	SS7	Tempio Pausania 2	12.08 km	Sordo / Rozada	Hyundai i20 Coupe WRC	9:48.5	Tänak / Järveoja
4 June	SS8	Erula – Tula 2	14.97 km	Sordo / Rozada; Neuville / Wydaeghe	Hyundai i20 Coupe WRC; Hyundai i20 Coupe WRC	11:10.4	Tänak / Järveoja
5 June	SS9	Coiluna – Loelle 1	15.00 km	Tänak / Järveoja	Hyundai i20 Coupe WRC	8:48.1	Tänak / Järveoja
5 June	SS10	Lerno – Monti di Alà 1	22.08 km	Ogier / Ingrassia	Toyota Yaris WRC	12:44.4	Tänak / Järveoja
5 June	SS11	Coiluna – Loelle 2	15.00 km	Evans / Martin	Toyota Yaris WRC	8:43.2	Tänak / Järveoja
5 June	SS12	Lerno – Monti di Alà 2	22.08 km	Ogier / Ingrassia	Toyota Yaris WRC	12:32.7	Ogier / Ingrassia
5 June	SS13	Bortigiadas – Aggius – Viddalba 1	14.70 km	Ogier / Ingrassia	Toyota Yaris WRC	10:30.3	Ogier / Ingrassia
5 June	SS14	Sedini – Castelsardo 1	13.03 km	Ogier / Ingrassia	Toyota Yaris WRC	9:42.5	Ogier / Ingrassia
5 June	SS15	Bortigiadas – Aggius – Viddalba 2	14.70 km	Ogier / Ingrassia	Toyota Yaris WRC	10:23.0	Ogier / Ingrassia
5 June	SS16	Sedini – Castelsardo 2	13.03 km	Evans / Martin	Toyota Yaris WRC	9:26.9	Ogier / Ingrassia
6 June	SS17	Arzachena – Braniatogghiu 1	15.25 km	Evans / Martin	Toyota Yaris WRC	8:45.4	Ogier / Ingrassia
6 June	SS18	Aglientu – Santa Teresa 1	7.79 km	Neuville / Wydaeghe	Hyundai i20 Coupe WRC	5:46.0	Ogier / Ingrassia
6 June	SS19	Arzachena – Braniatogghiu 2	15.25 km	Evans / Martin	Toyota Yaris WRC	8:37.0	Ogier / Ingrassia
6 June	SS20	Aglientu – Santa Teresa 2 [Power Stage]	7.79 km	Neuville / Wydaeghe	Hyundai i20 Coupe WRC	5:33.4	Ogier / Ingrassia

==== Championship standings ====
Pos.	Drivers' championships			Co-drivers' championships			Manufacturers' championships		
Pos.	Move	Driver	Points	Move	Co-driver	Points	Move	Manufacturer	Points
1		Sébastien Ogier	106		Julien Ingrassia	106		Toyota Gazoo Racing WRT	231
2		Elfyn Evans	95		Scott Martin	95		Hyundai Shell Mobis WRT	182
3		Thierry Neuville	77		Martijn Wydaeghe	77		M-Sport Ford WRT	82
4		Ott Tänak	49		Martin Järveoja	49		Hyundai 2C Competition	28
5	1	Takamoto Katsuta	48	1	Daniel Barritt	48			

=== World Rally Championship-2 ===
==== Classification ====
Position		No.	Driver	Co-driver	Entrant	Car	Time	Difference	Points		
Event	Class	No.	Driver	Co-driver	Entrant	Car	Time	Difference	Class	Stage	Event
5	1	30	Jari Huttunen	Mikko Lukka	Hyundai Motorsport N	Hyundai i20 R5	3:28:58.1	0.0	25	5	10
6	2	22	Mads Østberg	Torstein Eriksen	TRT World Rally Team	Citroën C3 Rally2	3:29:05.6	+7.5	18	4	8
10	3	22	Marco Bulacia Wilkinson	Marcelo Der Ohannesian	Toksport WRT	Škoda Fabia R5 Evo	3:31:01.0	+2:02.9	15	3	1
13	4	28	Martin Prokop	Zdeněk Jůrka	M-Sport Ford WRT	Ford Fiesta R5 Mk. II	3:36:51.5	+7:53.4	12	2	0
22	5	24	Enrico Brazzoli	Danilo Fappani	Movisport	Škoda Fabia R5	3:57:49.6	+28:51.5	10	0	0
30	6	23	Adrien Fourmaux	Renaud Jamoul	M-Sport Ford WRT	Ford Fiesta R5 Mk. II	4:38:32.2	+1:09:34.1	8	1	0
Retired SS19		29	Georg Linnamäe	Tanel Kasesalu	ALM Motorsport	Volkswagen Polo GTI R5	Crash		0	0	0
Retired SS5		20	Andreas Mikkelsen	Ola Fløene	Toksport WRT	Škoda Fabia R5 Evo	Roll cage		0	0	0
Retired SS1		26	Sean Johnston	Alex Kihurani	Saintéloc Junior Team	Citroën C3 Rally2	Rolled		0	0	0
Did not start		27	Ole Christian Veiby	Jonas Andersson	Hyundai Motorsport N	Hyundai i20 R5	Banned		0	0	0
Did not start		31	Andrea Crugnola	Pietro Ometto	Hyundai Motorsport N	Hyundai i20 R5	Withdrawn		0	0	0

==== Special stages ====
Day	Stage	Stage name	Length	Winners	Car	Time	Class leaders
3 June	—	Loiri Porto San Paolo [Shakedown]	2.89 km	Østberg / Eriksen	Citroën C3 Rally2	1:56.6	—N/a
4 June	SS1	Filigosu – Sa Conchedda 1	22.29 km	Østberg / Eriksen	Citroën C3 Rally2	13:46.0	Østberg / Eriksen
4 June	SS2	Terranova 1	14.36 km	Østberg / Eriksen	Citroën C3 Rally2	9:37.2	Østberg / Eriksen
4 June	SS3	Filigosu – Sa Conchedda 2	22.29 km	Mikkelsen / Fløene	Škoda Fabia R5 Evo	13:36.0	Østberg / Eriksen
4 June	SS4	Terranova 2	14.36 km	Østberg / Eriksen	Citroën C3 Rally2	9:32.0	Østberg / Eriksen
4 June	SS5	Tempio Pausania 1	12.08 km	Østberg / Eriksen	Citroën C3 Rally2	10:24.8	Østberg / Eriksen
4 June	SS6	Erula – Tula 1	14.97 km	Østberg / Eriksen	Citroën C3 Rally2	11:48.6	Østberg / Eriksen
4 June	SS7	Tempio Pausania 2	12.08 km	Østberg / Eriksen	Citroën C3 Rally2	10:11.8	Østberg / Eriksen
4 June	SS8	Erula – Tula 2	14.97 km	Huttunen / Lukka	Hyundai i20 R5	11:38.8	Østberg / Eriksen
5 June	SS9	Coiluna – Loelle 1	15.00 km	Østberg / Eriksen	Citroën C3 Rally2	9:25.2	Østberg / Eriksen
5 June	SS10	Lerno – Monti di Alà 1	22.08 km	Huttunen / Lukka	Hyundai i20 R5	13:36.7	Østberg / Eriksen
5 June	SS11	Coiluna – Loelle 2	15.00 km	Østberg / Eriksen	Citroën C3 Rally2	9:15.5	Østberg / Eriksen
5 June	SS12	Lerno – Monti di Alà 2	22.08 km	Huttunen / Lukka	Hyundai i20 R5	13:16.9	Østberg / Eriksen
5 June	SS13	Bortigiadas – Aggius – Viddalba 1	14.70 km	Østberg / Eriksen	Citroën C3 Rally2	10:49.9	Huttunen / Lukka
5 June	SS14	Sedini – Castelsardo 1	13.03 km	Fourmaux / Jamoul	Ford Fiesta R5 Mk. II	9:57.6	Huttunen / Lukka
5 June	SS15	Bortigiadas – Aggius – Viddalba 2	14.70 km	Østberg / Eriksen	Citroën C3 Rally2	10:45.5	Huttunen / Lukka
5 June	SS16	Sedini – Castelsardo 2	13.03 km	Fourmaux / Jamoul	Ford Fiesta R5 Mk. II	9:47.5	Huttunen / Lukka
6 June	SS17	Arzachena – Braniatogghiu 1	15.25 km	Østberg / Eriksen	Citroën C3 Rally2	9:09.6	Østberg / Eriksen
6 June	SS18	Aglientu – Santa Teresa 1	7.79 km	Fourmaux / Jamoul	Ford Fiesta R5 Mk. II	5:58.4	Huttunen / Lukka
6 June	SS19	Arzachena – Braniatogghiu 2	15.25 km	Østberg / Eriksen	Citroën C3 Rally2	8:51.3	Huttunen / Lukka
6 June	SS20	Aglientu – Santa Teresa 2 [Power Stage]	7.79 km	Huttunen / Lukka	Hyundai i20 R5	5:48.4	Huttunen / Lukka

==== Championship standings ====
Pos.	Drivers' championships			Co-drivers' championships			Teams' championships		
Pos.	Move	Driver	Points	Move	Co-driver	Points	Move	Manufacturer	Points
1		Andreas Mikkelsen	68		Ola Fløene	68	1	Toksport WRT	125
2	2	Mads Østberg	66	2	Torstein Eriksen	66	1	Movisport	125
3		Marco Bulacia Wilkinson	63		Marcelo Der Ohannesian	63		M-Sport Ford WRT	104
4	2	Esapekka Lappi	59	2	Janne Ferm	59		Hyundai Motorsport N	12
5		Teemu Suninen	41		Mikko Markkula	41			

=== World Rally Championship-3 ===
==== Classification ====
Position		No.	Driver	Co-driver	Entrant	Car	Time	Difference	Points		
Event	Class	No.	Driver	Co-driver	Entrant	Car	Time	Difference	Class	Stage	Event
7	1	32	Yohan Rossel	Alexandre Coria	Yohan Rossel	Citroën C3 Rally2	3:30:04.1	0.0	25	3	6
8	2	43	Pepe López	Diego Vallejo	Pepe López	Škoda Fabia R5 Evo	3:30:30.1	+26.0	18	2	4
9	3	42	Jan Solans	Rodrigo Sanjuan de Eusebio	Jan Solans	Citroën C3 Rally2	3:30:52.7	+48.6	15	1	2
11	4	42	Fabrizio Zaldívar	Carlos del Barrio	Fabrizio Zaldívar	Škoda Fabia R5 Evo	3:34:50.5	+4:46.4	12	0	0
12	5	47	Emilio Fernández	Ruben Garcia	Emilio Fernández	Škoda Fabia R5 Evo	3:36:39.8	+6:35.7	10	0	0
14	6	34	Nicolas Ciamin	Yannick Roche	Nicolas Ciamin	Citroën C3 Rally2	3:37:06.6	+7:02.5	8	0	0
15	7	46	Armin Kremer	Ella Kremer	Armin Kremer	Volkswagen Polo GTI R5	3:39:55.3	+9:51.2	6	0	0
16	8	35	Kajetan Kajetanowicz	Maciej Szczepaniak	Kajetan Kajetanowicz	Škoda Fabia R5 Evo	3:40:34.0	+9:51.2	4	4	0
19	9	40	Mauro Miele	Luca Beltrame	Mauro Miele	Škoda Fabia R5	3:52:34.0	+22:29.9	2	0	0
20	10	48	Pablo Biolghini	Stefano Pudda	Pablo Biolghini	Škoda Fabia R5	3:53:01.3	+22:57.2	1	0	0
35	11	49	Maurizio Morato	Enrico Gallinaro	Maurizio Morato	Škoda Fabia R5 Evo	5:14:11.6	+1:44:07.5	0	0	0
38	12	36	Egon Kaur	Silver Simm	Kaur Motorsport	Volkswagen Polo GTI R5	5:41:15.1	+2:11:11.0	0	5	0
Retired SS17		45	Alberto Heller	Marc Martí	Alberto Heller	Citroën C3 Rally2	Rolled		0	0	0
Retired SS10		49	Maurizio Morato	Enrico Gallinaro	Maurizio Morato	Škoda Fabia R5 Evo	Mechanical		0	0	0
Retired SS7		37	Emil Lindholm	Reeta Hämäläinen	Emil Lindholm	Škoda Fabia R5 Evo	Mechanical		0	0	0
Retired SS3		41	Alberto Battistolli	Simone Scattolin	Alberto Battistolli	Škoda Fabia R5 Evo	Crash		0	0	0

==== Special stages ====
Day	Stage	Stage name	Length	Winners	Car	Time	Class leaders
3 June	—	Loiri Porto San Paolo [Shakedown]	2.89 km	Ciamin / Roche	Citroën C3 Rally2	1:59.6	—N/a
4 June	SS1	Filigosu – Sa Conchedda 1	22.29 km	Rossel / Coria	Citroën C3 Rally2	13:59.4	Rossel / Coria
4 June	SS2	Terranova 1	14.36 km	Kajetanowicz / Szczepaniak	Škoda Fabia R5 Evo	9:54.2	Kajetanowicz / Szczepaniak
4 June	SS3	Filigosu – Sa Conchedda 2	22.29 km	Rossel / Coria	Citroën C3 Rally2	13:42.6	Rossel / Coria
4 June	SS4	Terranova 2	14.36 km	Rossel / Coria	Citroën C3 Rally2	9:35.0	Rossel / Coria
4 June	SS5	Tempio Pausania 1	12.08 km	Solans / Sanjuan de Eusebio	Citroën C3 Rally2	10:24.5	López / Vallejo
4 June	SS6	Erula – Tula 1	14.97 km	Rossel / Coria	Citroën C3 Rally2	11:51.4	Kajetanowicz / Szczepaniak
4 June	SS7	Tempio Pausania 2	12.08 km	Kajetanowicz / Szczepaniak	Škoda Fabia R5 Evo	10:12.6	Kajetanowicz / Szczepaniak
4 June	SS8	Erula – Tula 2	14.97 km	Rossel / Coria	Citroën C3 Rally2	11:35.1	Rossel / Coria
5 June	SS9	Coiluna – Loelle 1	15.00 km	Solans / Sanjuan de Eusebio	Citroën C3 Rally2	9:29.8	Rossel / Coria
5 June	SS10	Lerno – Monti di Alà 1	22.08 km	Solans / Sanjuan de Eusebio	Citroën C3 Rally2	13:40.9	Rossel / Coria
5 June	SS11	Coiluna – Loelle 2	15.00 km	Rossel / Coria	Citroën C3 Rally2	9:16.9	Rossel / Coria
5 June	SS12	Lerno – Monti di Alà 2	22.08 km	Rossel / Coria	Citroën C3 Rally2	13:22.3	Rossel / Coria
5 June	SS13	Bortigiadas – Aggius – Viddalba 1	14.70 km	Stage cancelled			
5 June	SS14	Sedini – Castelsardo 1	13.03 km	Kajetanowicz / Szczepaniak	Škoda Fabia R5 Evo	9:58.1	Rossel / Coria
5 June	SS15	Bortigiadas – Aggius – Viddalba 2	14.70 km	Solans / Sanjuan de Eusebio	Citroën C3 Rally2	10:47.1	Rossel / Coria
5 June	SS16	Sedini – Castelsardo 2	13.03 km	López / Vallejo	Škoda Fabia R5 Evo	9:49.7	Rossel / Coria
6 June	SS17	Arzachena – Braniatogghiu 1	15.25 km	López / Vallejo	Škoda Fabia R5 Evo	9:11.1	Rossel / Coria
6 June	SS18	Aglientu – Santa Teresa 1	7.79 km	Kajetanowicz / Szczepaniak	Škoda Fabia R5 Evo	5:54.6	Rossel / Coria
6 June	SS19	Arzachena – Braniatogghiu 2	15.25 km	Stage cancelled			
6 June	SS20	Aglientu – Santa Teresa 2 [Power Stage]	7.79 km	Kaur / Simm	Volkswagen Polo GTI R5	5:47.5	Rossel / Coria

==== Championship standings ====
Pos.	Drivers' championships			Co-drivers' championships		
Pos.	Move	Driver	Points	Move	Co-driver	Points
1		Yohan Rossel	98	2	Alexandre Coria	70
2		Kajetan Kajetanowicz	64	1	Maciek Szczepaniak	64
3		Nicolas Ciamin	57	1	Yannick Roche	57
4		Teemu Asunmaa	28		Benoît Fulcrand	28
5	2	Egon Kaur	28		Marko Salminen	28

== Notes ==
Previous rally: 2021 Rally de Portugal	2021 FIA World Rally Championship	Next rally: 2021 Safari Rally
Previous rally: 2020 Rally Italia Sardegna	2021 Rally Italia Sardegna	Next rally: 2022 Rally Italia Sardegna
