= 2021 WRC3 Championship =

The 2021 FIA WRC3 Championship was the eighth season of WRC3, a rallying championship organised and governed by the Fédération Internationale de l'Automobile as the third-highest tier of international rallying. It was open to privately entered cars complying with Group Rally2 regulations. The championship began in January 2021 with the Rallye Monte-Carlo and concluded in November 2021 with Rally Monza, running in support of the 2021 World Rally Championship.

Yohan Rossel won the driver's championship, while Maciek Szczepaniak took the co-driver's title.

The 2020 WRC3 driver and co-driver champions Jari Huttunen and Mikko Lukka did not defend their titles in 2021 due to progression to WRC2. Frenchman Yohan Rossel took the driver's title at the final round but due to his employing multiple co-drivers through the season, the co-driver title went to Maciek Szczepaniak, regular co-driver to Kajetan Kajetanowicz.

The 2021 WRC3 season was the last to use Group Rally2 cars. From 2022 the championship would use only Group Rally3 cars.

== Calendar ==
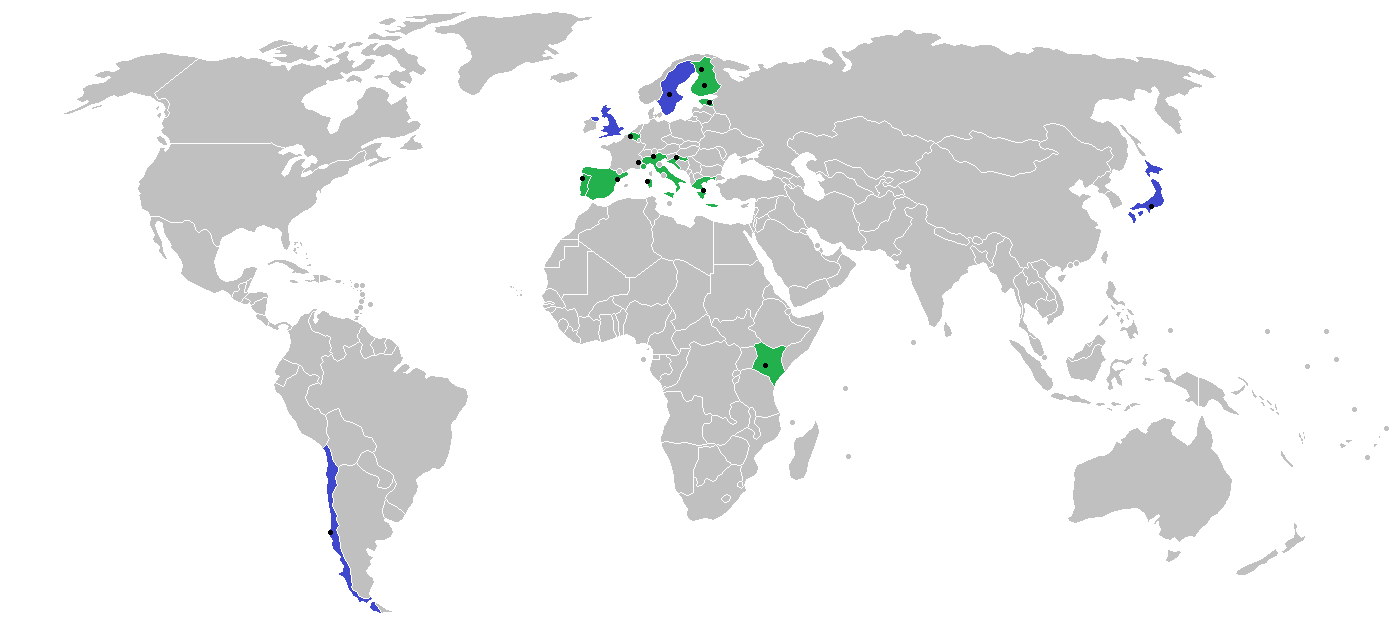
A map showing the locations of the rallies in the 2021 championship. Contested events are in green, while cancelled events are in blue. Event headquarters are marked with a black dot.

The 2021 championship was contested over twelve rounds in Europe and Africa:

Round	Start date	Finish date	Rally	Rally headquarters	Surface	Stages	Distance	Ref.
1	21 January	24 January	(Monaco) Rallye Automobile Monte Carlo	Gap, Provence-Alpes-Côte d'Azur (Note: The rally base of the Monte Carlo Rally was located in France.)	Mixed (Note: The Monte Carlo Rally was run on a tarmac and snow surface.)	14	257.64 km	
2	26 February	28 February	Arctic Rally Finland	Rovaniemi, Lapland	Snow	10	251.08 km	
3	22 April	25 April	Croatia Rally	Zagreb	Tarmac	20	300.32 km	
4	20 May	23 May	Rally de Portugal	Matosinhos, Porto	Gravel	20	337.51 km	
5	3 June	6 June	(Italy) Rally Italia Sardegna	Olbia, Sardinia	Gravel	20	303.10 km	
6	24 June	27 June	Safari Rally Kenya	Nairobi	Gravel	18	320.19 km	
7	15 July	18 July	Rally Estonia	Tartu, Tartu County	Gravel	24	314.16 km	
8	13 August	15 August	Ypres Rally Belgium	Ypres, West Flanders	Tarmac	20	295.78 km	
9	9 September	12 September	Acropolis Rally Greece	Lamia, Central Greece	Gravel	15	292.19 km	
10	1 October	3 October	Rally Finland	Jyväskylä, Central Finland	Gravel	19	287.11 km	
11	14 October	17 October	(Spain) RACC Rally Catalunya de España	Salou, Catalonia	Tarmac	17	280.46 km	
12	18 November	21 November	(Italy) ACI Rally Monza	Monza, Lombardy	Tarmac	16	253.18 km	

The following rounds were included on the original calendar published by WRC Promoter GmbH, but were later cancelled:

Start date	Finish date	Rally	Rally headquarters	Surface	Stages	Distance	Cancellation reason	Ref.
11 February	14 February	Rally Sweden	Torsby, Värmland	Snow	19	313.81 km	COVID-19 pandemic	
9 September	12 September	Rally Chile	Concepción, Biobío	Gravel	—N/a	—N/a	COVID-19 pandemic	
19 August	22 August	(United Kingdom) Rally GB	—N/a	—N/a	—N/a	—N/a	Financial issues	
11 November	14 November	Rally Japan	Nagoya, Chūbu	Tarmac	20	300.11 km	COVID-19 pandemic	

=== Calendar changes ===
With the addition of Rally Chile to the calendar in 2019, the FIA opened the tender process for new events to join the championship in 2020. Three events were successful, (Note: Rally New Zealand was successful in its bid to join the championship, but was cancelled because of the pandemic. It was not included on the 2021 calendar, but a separate, later bid from Rally Croatia was also successful.) but the championship was affected by a series of cancellations in 2019 and 2020 that necessitated changes to the 2021 calendar:

- Rally Catalunya returned to the championship. The rally was removed from the 2020 schedule as part of an event-sharing agreement that would see it removed from the calendar for one year, but was guaranteed a spot on the calendar for the next two. The rally returned to running exclusively on tarmac roads for the first time since 2009. (Note: Rally Catalunya had previously been run as a mixed surface rally, with the first leg of the event held on gravel roads and the final two legs on tarmac.)

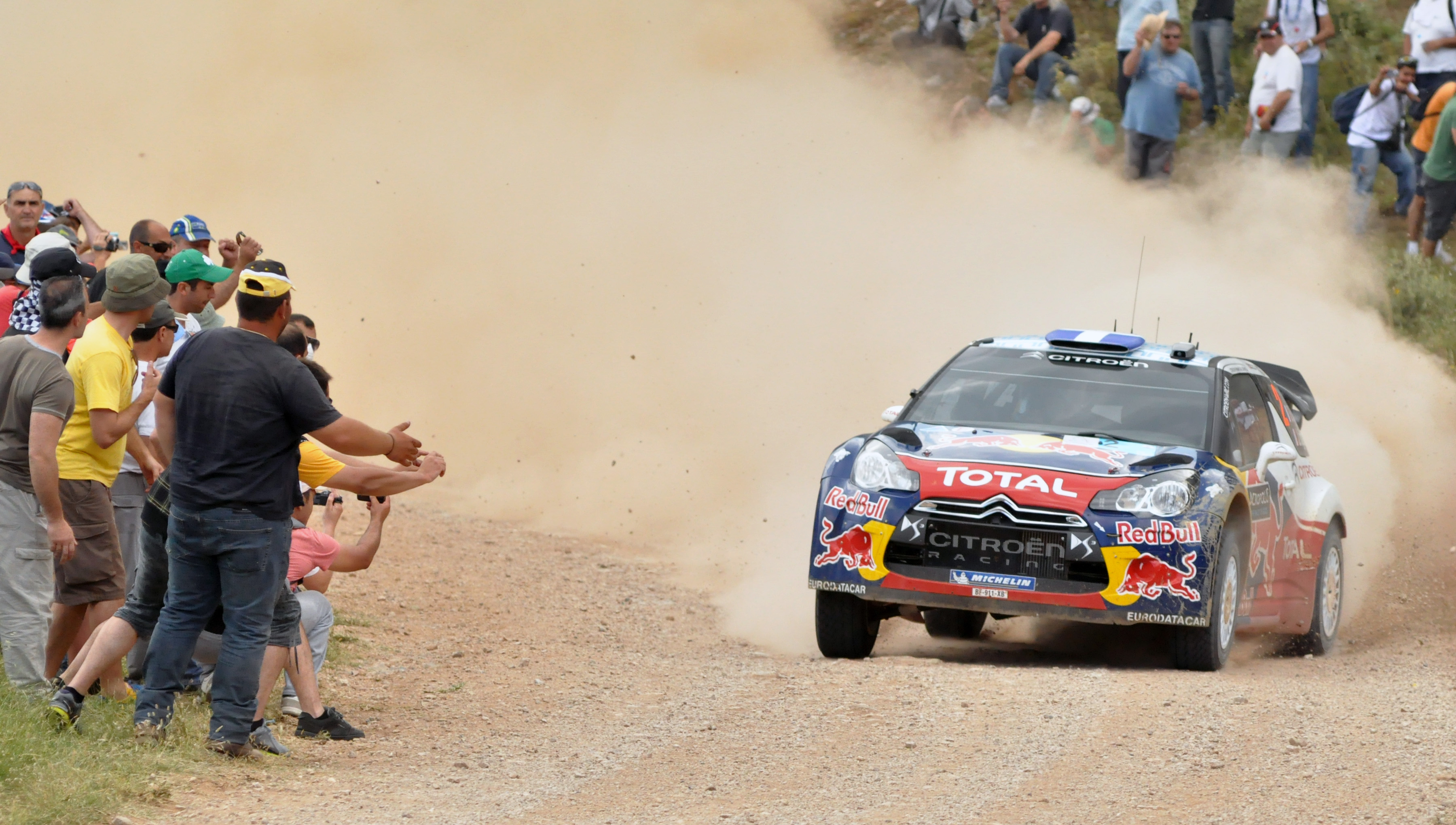
The Acropolis Rally of Greece returned to the championship for the first time since 2013.

- Rally Chile was due to return after a one-year absence. The rally had been included on the original draft of the 2020 calendar, but was later cancelled in the face of ongoing civil unrest in the country. Organisers of the event negotiated a return to the calendar for the 2021 championship, but it was again cancelled due to continued travel and other restrictions amid the COVID-19 pandemic. Acropolis Rally replaced the rally after a seven-year absence on the calendar.
- Rally Croatia made its championship debut, replacing Rally Mexico. Croatia thus became the 34th country to host a World Rally Championship round. It was based in Zagreb, and ran on tarmac roads.
- Rally Deutschland was removed from the calendar. The event had planned to run in 2020, but was cancelled due to the COVID-19 pandemic. It was not included on the 2021 calendar.
- The Rallies of Finland and Portugal also returned to the championship after a one-year absence. The 2020 events were cancelled in response to the COVID-19 pandemic.

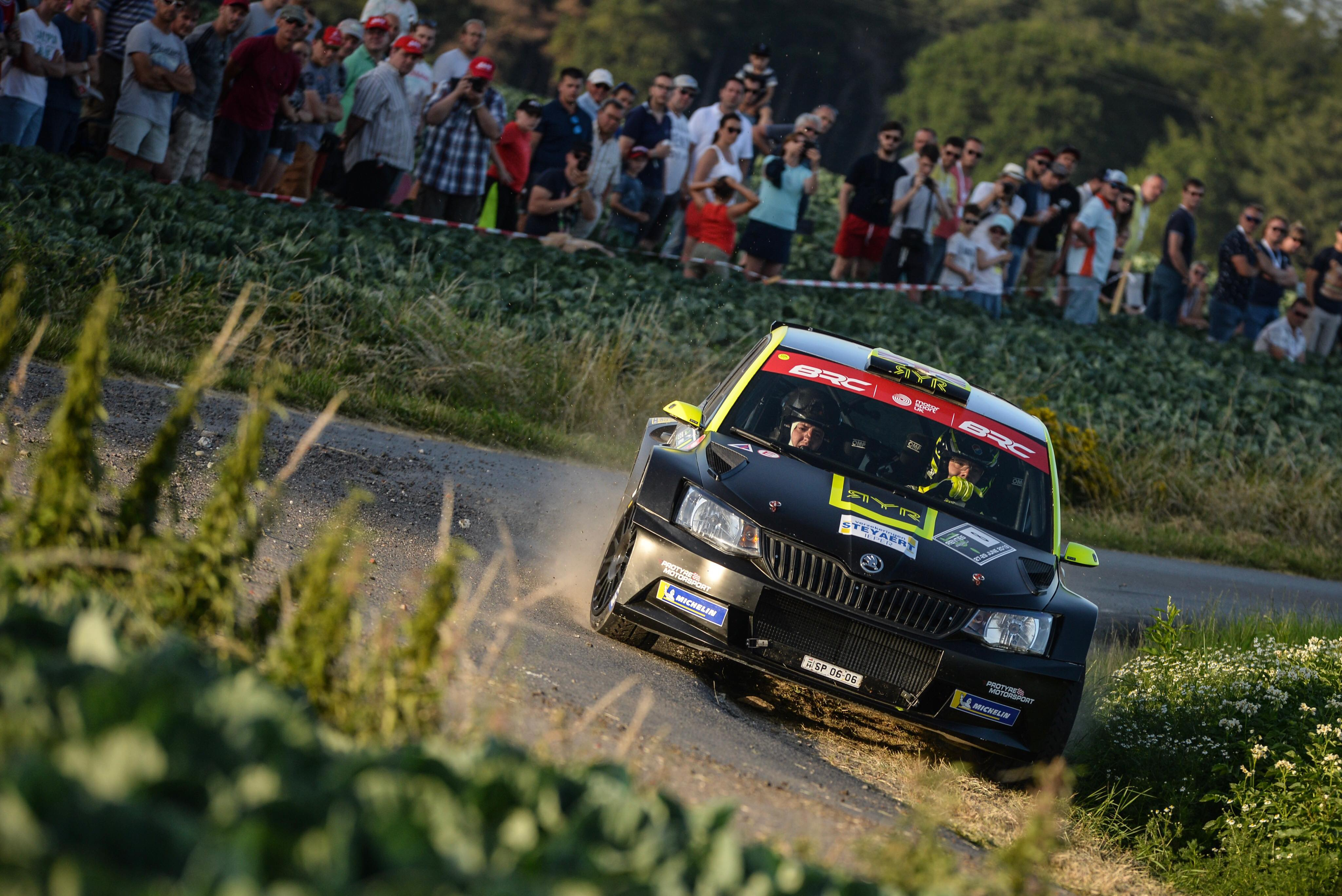
The Ypres Rally's debut made Belgium the 35th nation to hold a World Rally Championship event.

- Rally GB was replaced by the Ypres Rally in Belgium. Rally GB had originally planned to move from Wales to Northern Ireland, but the event was replaced when organisers were unable to come to an agreement with the government of Northern Ireland to support the rally.
- Rally Japan was scheduled to return to the calendar for the first time since 2010, but it was ultimately called off due to the COVID-19 pandemic. The rally was also originally included on the 2020 calendar, but was also cancelled because of the pandemic. Rally Monza was confirmed to hold the season finale for the second year in a row.
- The Safari Rally was run as a World Championship event for the first time since 2002. The event was based in the Kenyan capital Nairobi and featured stages around Lake Naivasha. The event had been planned to make its return to the championship in 2020, but was cancelled in response to the COVID-19 pandemic.

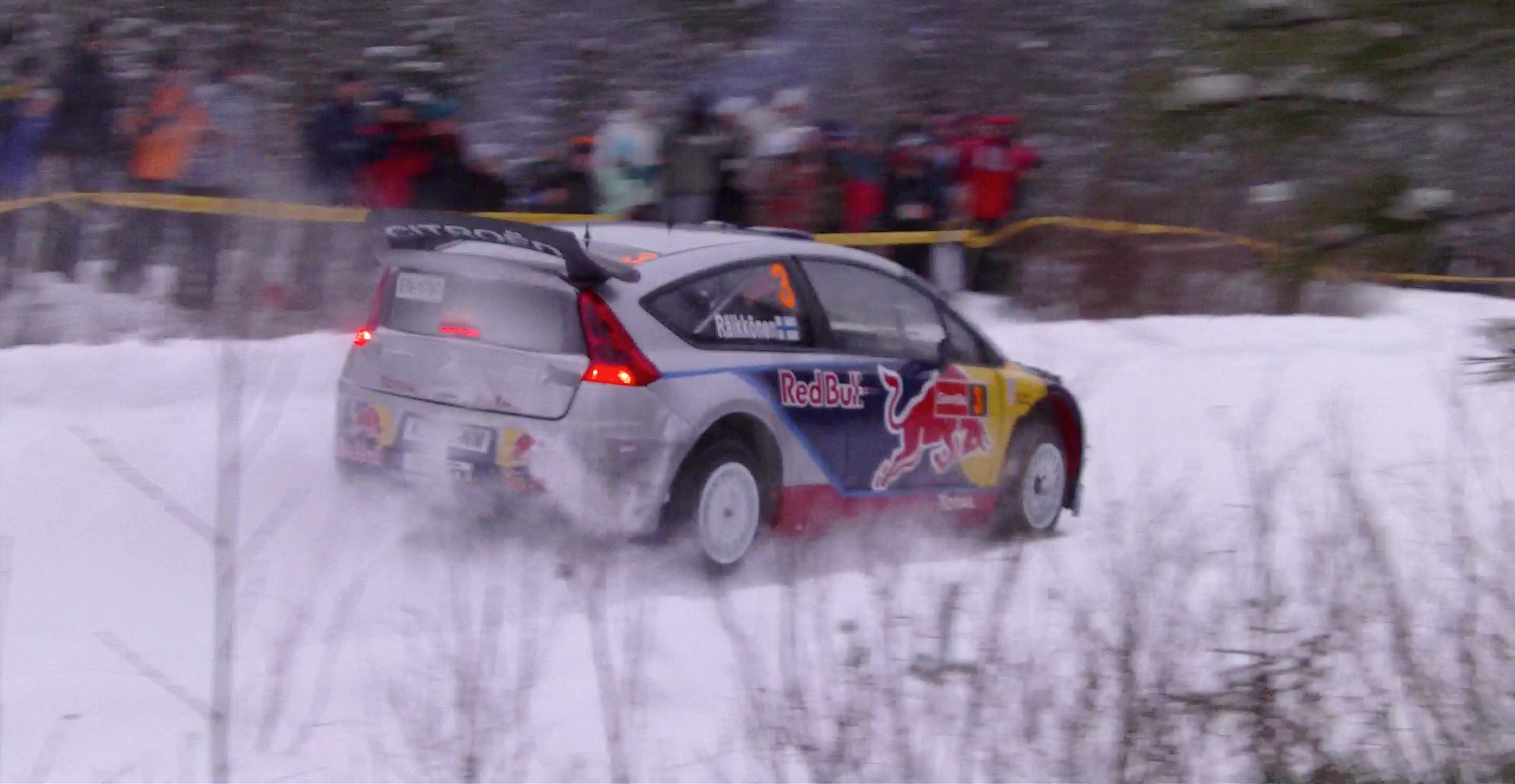
The Arctic Rally became the first World Rally Championship round to be held inside the Arctic Circle.

- Rally Sweden was included on the first draft of the calendar with its traditional February date, but was cancelled before the start of the season due to the COVID-19 pandemic. The Arctic Rally in northern Finland was chosen as a replacement to ensure that a winter rally was included on the calendar. (Note: The Arctic Rally was held twice during the 2021 calendar year. The first running in January was part of the Finnish Rally Championship and the second running in February was the World Championship round.)

In light of the disruption caused by the pandemic in 2020 and in anticipation of further delays, the calendar included an additional six reserve rounds that could be included in the event of rallies being cancelled. These events include rallies in Turkey, Argentina and Latvia. The Ypres Rally had also been included on this reserve list before it replaced Rally GB, so as the Acropolis Rally and Rally Monza.

== Entries ==
The following crews have entered, or will enter, the 2021 World Championship-3:

Entrant	Car	Driver name (Note: Under the Sporting Regulations, each car is entered under the driver's name.)	Co-driver name	Rounds
(Belgium) DG Sport Compétition	Citroën C3 Rally2	(France) Nicolas Ciamin	(France) Yannick Roche	1, 3–5
(Belgium) DG Sport Compétition	Citroën C3 Rally2	(Belgium) Davy Vanneste	(Belgium) Kris D'Alleine	1, 8
(Belgium) DG Sport Compétition	Citroën C3 Rally2	(Belgium) Kris Princen	(Belgium) Peter Kaspers	8
(France) Saintéloc Junior Team	Citroën C3 Rally2	(France) Yohan Rossel	(France) Benoît Fulcrand	1
(France) Saintéloc Junior Team	Citroën C3 Rally2	(France) Yohan Rossel	(France) Alexandre Coria	3–5, 8–9
(France) Saintéloc Junior Team	Citroën C3 Rally2	(France) Yohan Rossel	(France) Jacques-Julien Renucci	12
(France) Saintéloc Junior Team	Citroën C3 Rally2	(Germany) Armin Kremer	(Germany) Ella Kremer	11
(Italy) G. Car Sport Racing	Citroën C3 Rally2	(Italy) Giacomo Ogliari	(Italy) Lorenzo Granai	1
(Italy) G. Car Sport Racing	Citroën C3 Rally2	(Italy) Giacomo Ogliari	(Italy) Giacomo Ciucci	12
(France) CHL Sport Auto	Citroën C3 Rally2	(France) Yoann Bonato	(France) Benjamin Boulloud	1
(Hungary) TRT World Rally Team	Citroën C3 Rally2	(Poland) Michał Sołowow	(Poland) Maciek Baran	2
(Hungary) TRT World Rally Team	Citroën C3 Rally2	(Chile) Alberto Heller	(Spain) Marc Martí	4–5, 9
(Hungary) TRT World Rally Team	Citroën C3 Rally2	(Greece) Ioannis Plagos	(Greece) Alkiviadis Rentis	9
(Portugal) Citroën Vodafone Team	Citroën C3 Rally2	(Portugal) José Pedro Fontes	(Portugal) Inês Ponte	4
(Portugal) Citroën Vodafone Team	Citroën C3 Rally2	(Spain) Jan Solans	(Spain) Rodrigo Sanjuan	4–5, 11
(Portugal) Citroën Vodafone Team	Citroën C3 Rally2	(Portugal) André Villas-Boas	(Portugal) Gonçalo Magalhães	4
(Italy) F.P.F. Sport	Citroën C3 Rally2	(Italy) Rachele Somaschini	(Italy) Nicola Arena	12
(Greece) Roustemis Motorsport	Citroën DS3 R5	(Greece) Panagiotis Roustemis	(Greece) Konstantios Nikolopoulos	9
(Spain) Calm Competició	Škoda Fabia Rally2 Evo	(Spain) Miguel Díaz-Aboitiz	(Spain) Diego Sanjuan	1–2, 7, 9–11
(Italy) Metior Sport	Škoda Fabia Rally2 Evo	(Belgium) Cédric De Cecco	(Belgium) Jérôme Humblet	1, 3, 8
(Czech Republic) Keane Motorsport	Škoda Fabia Rally2 Evo	(Austria) Johannes Keferböck	(Austria) Ilka Minor	1, 3
(Finland) TGS Worldwide	Škoda Fabia Rally2 Evo	(Finland) Teemu Asunmaa	(Finland) Marko Salminen	2, 10
(Finland) TGS Worldwide	Škoda Fabia Rally2 Evo	(Finland) Emil Lindholm	(Finland) Mikael Korhonen	2
(Finland) TGS Worldwide	Škoda Fabia Rally2 Evo	(Finland) Emil Lindholm	(Finland) Reeta Hämäläinen	10
(Finland) TGS Worldwide	Škoda Fabia Rally2 Evo	(Finland) Mikko Heikkilä	(Finland) Topi Luhtinen	2, 7, 10–11
(Sweden) EKS JC	Škoda Fabia Rally2 Evo	(Sweden) Mattias Ekström	(Sweden) Emil Bergkvist	2
(Sweden) EKS JC	Škoda Fabia Rally2 Evo	(Germany) Albert von Thurn und Taxis	(Austria) Bernhard Ettel	2
(Estonia) Tehase Auto	Škoda Fabia Rally2 Evo	(Estonia) Gregor Jeets	(Estonia) Andrus Toom	2, 4
(Estonia) Tehase Auto	Škoda Fabia Rally2 Evo	(Estonia) Raul Jeets	(Estonia) Andrus Toom	7, 10
(Finland) Printsport	Škoda Fabia Rally2 Evo	(Finland) Ville Ruokanen	(Finland) Timo Pallari	2
(Germany) Toksport World Rally Team	Škoda Fabia Rally2 Evo	(Paraguay) Fabrizio Zaldivar	(Spain) Carlos del Barrio	2–5, 7, 9, 11
(Germany) Toksport World Rally Team	Škoda Fabia Rally2 Evo	(Finland) Emil Lindholm	(Finland) Mikael Korhonen	3
(Germany) Toksport World Rally Team	Škoda Fabia Rally2 Evo	(Finland) Emil Lindholm	(Finland) Reeta Hämäläinen	4–5, 7, 9
(Germany) Toksport World Rally Team	Škoda Fabia Rally2 Evo	(Finland) Emil Lindholm	(Finland) Reeta Hämäläinen	11 (Note: On official documents Reeta Hämäläinen is entered as the driver while Emil Lindholm is entered as the co-driver.)
(Germany) Toksport World Rally Team	Škoda Fabia Rally2 Evo	(Chile) Emilio Fernández	(Argentina) Rubén García	4–5, 7, 9
(Germany) Toksport World Rally Team	Škoda Fabia Rally2 Evo	(United Kingdom) Chris Ingram	(United Kingdom) Ross Whittock	9, 11–12
(Germany) Toksport World Rally Team	Škoda Fabia Rally2 Evo	(United Kingdom) Neil Simpson	(United Kingdom) Michael Gibson	11
(Germany) Toksport World Rally Team	Škoda Fabia Rally2 Evo	(Czech Republic) Dominik Stříteský	(Czech Republic) Jiří Hovorka	11
(Latvia) Sports Racing Technologies	Škoda Fabia Rally2 Evo	(Lithuania) Vladas Jurkevičius	(Lithuania) Aisvydas Paliukėnas	2, 7
(Latvia) Sports Racing Technologies	Škoda Fabia Rally2 Evo	Alexey Lukyanuk (Note: Aleksey Lukyanuk is Russian, but he competes as a neutral competitor using the designation RAF (Russian Automobile Federation), as the Court of Arbitration for Sport upheld a ban on Russia competing at World Championships. The ban was implemented by the World Anti-Doping Agency in response to state-sponsored doping program of Russian athletes.)	Yaroslav Fedorov (Note: Yaroslav Fedorov is Russian, but he competes as a neutral competitor using the designation RAF (Russian Automobile Federation), as the Court of Arbitration for Sport upheld a ban on Russia competing at World Championships. The ban was implemented by the World Anti-Doping Agency in response to state-sponsored doping program of Russian athletes.)	7
(Belgium) SXM Compétition	Škoda Fabia Rally2 Evo	(United Kingdom) Chris Ingram	(United Kingdom) Ross Whittock	3–5
(Belgium) SXM Compétition	Škoda Fabia Rally2 Evo	(Belgium) Sébastien Bedoret	(France) François Gilbert	8
(Poland) Lotos Rally Team	Škoda Fabia Rally2 Evo	(Poland) Kajetan Kajetanowicz	(Poland) Maciek Szczepaniak	3–5, 7, 9, 11–12
(Italy) Dream One Racing	Škoda Fabia Rally2 Evo	(Italy) Mauro Miele	(Italy) Luca Beltrame	3, 11–12
(Portugal) The Racing Factory	Škoda Fabia Rally2 Evo	(Portugal) Armindo Araújo	(Portugal) Luís Ramalho	4
(Portugal) ARC Sport	Škoda Fabia Rally2 Evo	(Portugal) Ricardo Teodósio	(Portugal) José Teixeira	4
(Portugal) ARC Sport	Škoda Fabia Rally2 Evo	(Portugal) Miguel Correia	(Portugal) António Costa	4
(Spain) Race Seven	Škoda Fabia Rally2 Evo	(Spain) Pepe López	(Spain) Diego Vallejo	4–5
(Spain) Race Seven	Škoda Fabia Rally2 Evo	(Spain) Pepe López	(Spain) Borja Odriozola	7–8, 10
(Spain) Race Seven	Škoda Fabia Rally2 Evo	(Spain) Pepe López	(Spain) Borja Rozada	11
(Italy) Delta Rally	Škoda Fabia Rally2 Evo	(Italy) Alberto Battistolli	(Italy) Simone Scattolin	5
(Italy) Delta Rally	Škoda Fabia Rally2 Evo	(Italy) Maurizio Morato	(Italy) Enrico Gallinaro	5
(Italy) Delta Rally	Škoda Fabia Rally2 Evo	(Italy) Damiano De Tommaso	(Italy) Giorgia Ascalone	12
(Belgium) Icepol Racing Team	Škoda Fabia Rally2 Evo	(Belgium) Ghislain de Mevius	(Belgium) Johan Jalet	8
(Belgium) Racing Technology	Škoda Fabia Rally2 Evo	(Belgium) Adrian Fernémont	(Belgium) Samuel Maillen	8
(Belgium) BMA Autosport	Škoda Fabia Rally2 Evo	(Belgium) Pieter Jan Michiel Cracco	(Belgium) Jasper Vermeulen	8
(Greece) On Sale Rally Team	Škoda Fabia Rally2 Evo	(Greece) Georgios Kechagias	(Greece) Marios Tsaousoglou	9
(Hungary) Topp-Cars Rally Team	Škoda Fabia Rally2 Evo	(Greece) Vasileios Velanis	(Greece) Ioannis Velanis	9
(Italy) MS Munaretto	Škoda Fabia Rally2 Evo	(Italy) Pablo Biolghini	(Switzerland) Marco Menchini	12
(Italy) PA Racing	Škoda Fabia Rally2 Evo	(Italy) Alessandro Perico	(Italy) Mauro Turati	12
(Italy) PA Racing	Škoda Fabia Rally2 Evo	(Italy) Lorenzo Bontempelli	(Italy) Gianluca Marchioni	12
(Italy) H-Sport	Škoda Fabia Rally2 Evo	(Italy) Marco Paccagnella	(Italy) Mattia Orio	12
(Italy) Delta Rally	Škoda Fabia R5	(Italy) Fabrizio Arengi	(Italy) Massimiliano Bosi	1, 9
(Italy) Metior Sport	Škoda Fabia R5	(Belgium) Cédric Cherain	(Belgium) Stéphane Prévot	1
(Italy) Metior Sport	Škoda Fabia R5	(Belgium) Harry Bouillon	(Belgium) Gregory Antoine	8
(Italy) Dream One Racing	Škoda Fabia R5	(Italy) Mauro Miele	(Italy) Luca Beltrame	1–2, 5
(Finland) TGS Worldwide	Škoda Fabia R5	(Finland) Eerik Pietarinen	(Finland) Antti Linnaketo	2
(Finland) TGS Worldwide	Škoda Fabia R5	(Finland) Marko Viitanen	(Finland) Tapio Suominen	2
(Finland) Printsport	Škoda Fabia R5	(Finland) Pekka Keski-Korsu	(Finland) Markus Silfvast	2
(Finland) Printsport	Škoda Fabia R5	(Finland) Tuomas Skantz	(Finland) Kari Kallio	2
(Finland) Printsport	Škoda Fabia R5	(Finland) Jussi Keskiniva	(Finland) Mikko Kaikkonen	2
(Finland) Printsport	Škoda Fabia R5	(Sweden) Lars Stugemo	(Sweden) Kalle Lexe	2
(Finland) Printsport	Škoda Fabia R5	(Finland) Juuso Metsälä	(Finland) Matti Kangas	10
(Finland) Printsport	Škoda Fabia R5	(Finland) Lauri Joona	(Finland) Mikael Korhonen	10
(Finland) Koivisto Racing	Škoda Fabia R5	(Finland) Ari-Pekka Koivisto	(Finland) Jussi Kärpijoki	2
(Poland) Hołowczyc Racing	Škoda Fabia R5	(Poland) Adrian Chwietczuk	(Poland) Jarosław Baran	2
(Belgium) SXM Compétition	Škoda Fabia R5	(Belgium) Sébastien Bedoret	(Belgium) Thomas Walbrecq	3
(Belgium) SXM Compétition	Škoda Fabia R5	(Belgium) Filip Pyck	(Belgium) Peter Dehouck	8
(Belgium) SXM Compétition	Škoda Fabia R5	(Greece) Spyridon Galerakis	(Greece) Konstantinos Souloukis	9
(Portugal) BS Motorsport	Škoda Fabia R5	(Portugal) Bernardo Sousa	(Portugal) Victor Calado	4
(Portugal) ARC Sport	Škoda Fabia R5	(Portugal) Paulo Neto	(Portugal) Vítor Hugo	4
(Portugal) Sports & You	Škoda Fabia R5	(Portugal) Diogo Salvi	(Portugal) Jorge Carvalho	4
(Portugal) The Racing Factory	Škoda Fabia R5	(Portugal) João Fernando Ramos	(Portugal) José Janela	4
(Italy) MS Munaretto	Škoda Fabia R5	(Italy) Pablo Biolghini	(Italy) Stefano Pudda	5
(Kenya) Arrow Rally Team	Škoda Fabia R5	(Kenya) Aakif Virani	(Kenya) Azhar Bhatti	6
(Belgium) BMA Autosport	Škoda Fabia R5	(Belgium) Kevin Hommes	(Belgium) Marco Hommes	8
(Belgium) BMA Autosport	Škoda Fabia R5	(Belgium) Kurt Dujardyn	(Belgium) Jeannick Breyne	8
(Italy) Motorsport Italia	Škoda Fabia R5	(Brazil) Paulo Nobre	(Brazil) Gabriel Morales	9–10
(Finland) Esko Reiner Motorsport	Škoda Fabia R5	(Finland) Jari Huuhka	(Finland) Jarno Metso	10
(Italy) Balbosca Rally Team	Škoda Fabia R5	(Italy) Marco Roncoroni	(Italy) Paolo Brusadelli	12
(Italy) Pavel Group Corse	Škoda Fabia R5	(Italy) Jacopo Civelli	(Italy) Massimo Moriconi	12
(Italy) PA Racing	Škoda Fabia R5	(Italy) Patrizia Perosino	(Italy) Veronica Verzoletto	12
(Italy) Roger Tuning	Škoda Fabia R5	(Italy) Giancarlo Terzi	(Italy) Samuele Perino	12
(United Kingdom) Dom Buckley Motorsport	Ford Fiesta Rally2	(United Kingdom) Tom Williams	(Italy) Giorgia Ascalone	1
(United Kingdom) Dom Buckley Motorsport	Ford Fiesta Rally2	(United Kingdom) Frank Bird	(United Kingdom) Jack Morton	12
(Austria) ZM Racing Team	Ford Fiesta Rally2	(Austria) Hermann Neubauer	(Austria) Bernhard Ettel	1, 3
(Austria) ZM Racing Team	Ford Fiesta Rally2	(Austria) Kevin Raith	(Austria) Gerald Winter	3
(Austria) STARD	Ford Fiesta Rally2	(Japan) Hiroki Arai	(Austria) Jürgen Heigl	3
(Austria) Drift Company Rally Team	Ford Fiesta Rally2	(Austria) Niki Mayr-Melnhof	(Austria) Poldi Welsersheimb	3–4
(United Kingdom) M-Sport Ford World Rally Team	Ford Fiesta Rally2	(Poland) Daniel Chwist	(Poland) Kamil Heller	6
(United Kingdom) M-Sport Ford World Rally Team	Ford Fiesta Rally2	(United Kingdom) Sebastian Perez	(Republic of Ireland) Gary McElhinney	11
(Estonia) OT Racing	Ford Fiesta Rally2	(Estonia) Priit Koik	(Estonia) Kristo Tamm	7
(Belgium) Fast Time Engineering	Ford Fiesta Rally2	(Belgium) Bernd Casier	(Belgium) Pieter Vyncke	8
(France) TM Compétition	Ford Fiesta Rally2	(Belgium) Maxime Potty	(Belgium) Loïc Dumont	8
(Hungary) Hadik Rallye Team	Ford Fiesta Rally2	(Greece) Panagiotis Chatzitsopanis	(Greece) Nikos Petropoulos	9
(Slovenia) AK Plamtex Sport	Ford Fiesta R5	(Slovenia) Aleš Zrinski	(Slovenia) Rok Vidmar	3
(Kenya) Karan Patel Racing	Ford Fiesta R5	(Kenya) Karan Patel	(Kenya) Tauseef Khan	6
(Sweden) Kristoffersson Motorsport	Volkswagen Polo GTI R5	(Sweden) Johan Kristoffersson	(Sweden) Patrik Barth	2
(Estonia) Kaur Motorsport	Volkswagen Polo GTI R5	(Estonia) Egon Kaur	(Estonia) Silver Simm	2, 4–5, 7, 10
(Finland) Printsport	Volkswagen Polo GTI R5	(Saudi Arabia) Rakan Al-Rashed	(Portugal) Hugo Magalhães	2, 7
(Finland) Printsport	Volkswagen Polo GTI R5	(Finland) Eerik Pietarinen	(Finland) Antti Linnaketo	10
(Portugal) Racing 4 You	Volkswagen Polo GTI R5	(Portugal) Pedro Meireles	(Portugal) Mário Castro	4
(Austria) BRR Baumschlager Rallye & Racing Team	Volkswagen Polo GTI R5	(Germany) Armin Kremer	(Germany) Ella Kremer	5
(Kenya) Kabras Sugar Racing	Volkswagen Polo GTI R5	(Kenya) Onkar Rai	(United Kingdom) Drew Sturrock	6
(Kenya) Kabras Sugar Racing	Volkswagen Polo GTI R5	(Kenya) Tejveer Rai	(Zimbabwe) Gareth Dawe	6
(United Kingdom) Minti Motorsport	Volkswagen Polo GTI R5	(Kenya) Carl Tundo	(Kenya) Tim Jessop	6
(Belgium) Pieter Tsjoen Racing	Volkswagen Polo GTI R5	(Belgium) Pieter Tsjoen	(Belgium) Eddy Chevaillier	8
(Belgium) Godrive Racing	Volkswagen Polo GTI R5	(Belgium) Vincent Verschueren	(Belgium) Filip Cuvelier	8
(Cyprus) Petrolina Racing Team	Volkswagen Polo GTI R5	(Cyprus) Alex Tsouloftas	(Cyprus) Stelios Elia	9
(Italy) PA Racing	Volkswagen Polo GTI R5	(Italy) Alberto Dall'era	(Italy) Edoardo Brovelli	12
Team Hyundai Portugal	Hyundai i20 R5	(Portugal) Bruno Magalhães	(Portugal) Carlos Magalhães	4
(Republic of Ireland) Motorsport Ireland Rallly Academy	Hyundai i20 R5	(Republic of Ireland) Josh McErlean	(United Kingdom) Keaton Williams	4
(Republic of Ireland) Motorsport Ireland Rallly Academy	Hyundai i20 R5	(Republic of Ireland) Josh McErlean	(Republic of Ireland) James Fulton	8, 11
(Russian Automobile Federation) TAIF Motorsport	Hyundai i20 R5	Radik Shaymiev (Note: Radik Shaymiev is Russian, but he competes as a neutral competitor using the designation RAF (Russian Automobile Federation), as the Court of Arbitration for Sport upheld a ban on Russia competing at World Championships. The ban was implemented by the World Anti-Doping Agency in response to state-sponsored doping program of Russian athletes.)	Maxim Tsvetkov (Note: Maxim Tsvetkov is Russian, but he competes as a neutral competitor using the designation RAF (Russian Automobile Federation), as the Court of Arbitration for Sport upheld a ban on Russia competing at World Championships. The ban was implemented by the World Anti-Doping Agency in response to state-sponsored doping program of Russian athletes.)	7
(South Korea) Hyundai Motorsport N	Hyundai i20 R5	(Luxembourg) Grégoire Munster	(Belgium) Louis Louka	8
(South Korea) Hyundai Motorsport N	Hyundai i20 R5	(Finland) Riku Tahko	(Finland) Markus Soininen	10
(South Korea) Hyundai Motorsport N	Hyundai i20 R5	(Czech Republic) Martin Vlček	(Czech Republic) Karolína Jugasová	10
(Poland) Rally Technology	Hyundai i20 R5	(Poland) Daniel Chwist	(Poland) Kamil Heller	9
(South Korea) Hyundai Motorsport N	Hyundai i20 N Rally2	(Greece) Lambros Athanassoulas	(Greece) Nikolaos Zakchaios	9
(South Korea) Hyundai Motorsport N	Hyundai i20 N Rally2	(Luxembourg) Grégoire Munster	(Belgium) Louis Louka	12
(South Korea) Hyundai Motorsport N	Hyundai i20 N Rally2	(Italy) Andrea Crugnola	(Italy) Pietro Ometto	12
(South Korea) Hyundai Motorsport N	Hyundai i20 N Rally2	(Italy) Stefano Albertini	(Italy) Danilo Fappani	12
(Republic of Ireland) Motorsport Ireland Rally Academy	Hyundai i20 N Rally2	(Republic of Ireland) Josh McErlean	(Republic of Ireland) James Fulton	12

== Changes ==
=== Technical regulations ===
Pirelli will become the WRC's sole tyre supplier following the removal of Michelin and Yokohama from the approved tyre supplier list. Under the terms of the agreement, Pirelli will supply tyres to all crews entering in four-wheel drive cars.

=== Sporting regulations ===
Competitors in the WRC3 category will be awarded Power Stage bonus points for the first time.

== Results and standings ==
=== Season summary ===
Round	Event	Winning driver	Winning co-driver	Winning entrant	Winning time	Report	Ref.
1	(Monaco) Rallye Automobile Monte Carlo	(France) Yohan Rossel	(France) Benoît Fulcrand	(France) Saintéloc Junior Team	3:08:25.8	Report	
2	Arctic Rally Finland	(Finland) Teemu Asunmaa	(Finland) Marko Salminen	(Finland) TGS Worldwide	2:11:55.3	Report	
3	Croatia Rally	(Poland) Kajetan Kajetanowicz	(Poland) Maciek Szczepaniak	(Poland) Lotos Rally Team	3:03:23.8	Report	
4	Rally de Portugal	(Poland) Kajetan Kajetanowicz	(Poland) Maciek Szczepaniak	(Poland) Lotos Rally Team	3:52:49.7	Report	
5	(Italy) Rally Italia Sardegna	(France) Yohan Rossel	(France) Alexandre Coria	(France) Saintéloc Junior Team	3:30:04.1	Report	
6	Safari Rally Kenya	(Kenya) Onkar Rai	(United Kingdom) Drew Sturrock	(Kenya) Kabras Sugar Racing	3:47:37.7	Report	
7	Rally Estonia	Alexey Lukyanuk	Yaroslav Fedorov	(Latvia) Sports Racing Technologies	3:01:45.2	Report	
8	Ypres Rally Belgium	(France) Yohan Rossel	(France) Alexandre Coria	(France) Saintéloc Junior Team	2:42:39.1	Report	
9	Acropolis Rally Greece	(Poland) Kajetan Kajetanowicz (Note: Yohan Rossel finished the rally in first, but was disqualified in post-event scrutineering after the front subframe was found to be overweight.)	(Poland) Maciek Szczepaniak (Note: Alexandre Coria finished the rally in first, but was disqualified in post-event scrutineering after the front subframe was found to be overweight.)	(Poland) Lotos Rally Team	3:39:48.2	Report	
10	Rally Finland	(Finland) Emil Lindholm	(Finland) Reeta Hämäläinen	(Finland) TGS Worldwide	2:30:06.5	Report	
11	(Spain) RACC Rally Catalunya de España	(Finland) Reeta Hämäläinen	(Finland) Emil Lindholm	(Germany) Toksport WRT	2:44:31.9	Report	
12	(Italy) Rally Monza	(Italy) Andrea Crugnola	(Italy) Pietro Ometto	(South Korea) Hyundai Motorsport N	2:48:15.5	Report	

=== Scoring system ===
Points were awarded to the top ten classified finishers in each event. There were also five bonus points awarded to the winners of the Power Stage, four points for second place, three for third, two for fourth and one for fifth. Crews were only allowed to enter a maximum of 7 events with the 5 best results scoring points in the championship.

Position	1st	2nd	3rd	4th	5th	6th	7th	8th	9th	10th
Points	25	18	15	12	10	8	6	4	2	1

=== FIA WRC3 Championship for Drivers ===
Pos.	Driver	MON (Monaco)	ARC (Finland)	CRO (Croatia)	POR (Portugal)	ITA (Italy)	KEN (Kenya)	EST (Estonia)	BEL (Belgium)	GRC (Greece)	FIN (Finland)	ESP (Spain)	MNZ (Italy)	Drops	Points
1	(France) Yohan Rossel	1^{3}		3^{1}	2^{2}	1^{3}			1^{2}	DSQ			2^{1}	20	130
2	(Poland) Kajetan Kajetanowicz			1^{3}	1^{3}	8^{2}		2		1^{1}		2^{1}	3^{3}	26	127
3	(Finland) Emil Lindholm		Ret	2^{4}	10^{1}	Ret		Ret		3^{2}	1^{3}			0	73
4	(United Kingdom) Chris Ingram			5^{5}	3^{4}	Ret				2^{3}		4^{3}	8^{4}	0	70
5	(France) Nicolas Ciamin	3^{1}		4^{2}	4^{5}	6								0	57
6	(Spain) Pepe López				Ret	2^{4}		4^{2}	WD		4^{2}	Ret		0	52
7	(Finland) Mikko Heikkilä		3					3^{5}			2^{5}	10		0	51
8	(Paraguay) Fabrizio Zaldívar		13	6	6	4		7^{1}		9^{4}		6		4	47
9	(Republic of Ireland) Josh McErlean				5				5			3^{4}	6^{5}	0	46
10	(Estonia) Egon Kaur		2^{1}		Ret	12^{1}		10^{3}			6^{1}			0	45
11	(Kenya) Onkar Rai						1^{1}							0	30
12	(Finland) Reeta Hämäläinen											1^{2}		0	29
13	(Italy) Andrea Crugnola												1^{2}	0	29
14	(Finland) Teemu Asunmaa		1^{3}								Ret			0	28
15	Alexey Lukyanuk							1						0	25
16	(France) Yoann Bonato	2^{2}												0	22
17	(Kenya) Karan Patel						2^{4}							0	20
18	(Luxembourg) Grégoire Munster								9^{1}				4	0	19
19	(Belgium) Pieter Jan Michiel Cracco								2					0	18
20	(Kenya) Carl Tundo						3^{3}							0	18
21	(Belgium) Vincent Verschueren								3^{4}					0	17
22	(Finland) Lauri Joona										3^{4}			0	17
23	(Germany) Armin Kremer					7						5^{5}		0	17
24	(Spain) Jan Solans				Ret	3^{5}						Ret		0	16
25	(Poland) Daniel Chwist						4^{2}							0	16
26	(Estonia) Raul Jeets							5			7			0	16
27	(Chile) Emilio Fernández				13	5		8^{4}						0	16
28	(Belgium) Cédric De Cecco	5^{5}		Ret					8^{5}					0	16
29	(Austria) Hermann Neubauer	4^{4}		Ret										0	14
30	(Belgium) Sébastien Bedoret			10					4					0	13
31	(Finland) Eerik Pietarinen		4^{5}								Ret			0	13
32	(Greece) Giorgos Kehagias									4				0	12
33	(Sweden) Mattias Ekström		5^{4}											0	12
34	(Austria) Johannes Keferböck	7		7										0	12
35	(Italy) Mauro Miele	Ret	21	8		9						7	11	0	12
36	(Kenya) Aakif Virani						5^{5}							0	11
37	(Greece) Roustemis Panagiotis									5				0	10
38	(Finland) Riku Tahko										5			0	10
39	(Italy) Damiano De Tommaso												5	0	10
40	(Belgium) Ghislain de Mevius								7^{3}					0	9
41	(Estonia) Gregor Jeets		6		11									0	8
42	(Belgium) Davy Vanneste	6							14					0	8
43	(Lithuania) Vladas Jurkevičius		18					6						0	8
44	(Belgium) Bernd Casier								6					0	8
45	(Greece) Vasileios Velanis									6				0	8
46	(Brazil) Paulo Nobre									7	10			0	7
47	(Finland) Pekka Keski-Korsu		7											0	6
48	(Portugal) Armindo Araújo				7									0	6
49	(Italy) Alessandro Perico												7	0	6
50	(Sweden) Johan Kristoffersson		10^{2}											0	5
51	(Chile) Alberto Heller				8	Ret								0	4
52	(Italy) Giacomo Ogliari	8											14	0	4
53	(Finland) Tuomas Skantz		8											0	4
54	(Greece) Ioannis Plagos									8				0	4
55	(Czech Republic) Martin Vlček										8			0	4
56	(United Kingdom) Neil Simpson											8		0	4
57	(Spain) Miguel Díaz-Aboitiz	11	20					9		11	12	Ret		0	2
58	(Belgium) Cédric Cherain	9												0	2
59	(Poland) Michał Sołowow		9											0	2
60	(Austria) Kevin Raith			9										0	2
61	(Portugal) Paulo Neto				9									0	2
62	(Finland) Jari Huuhka										9			0	2
63	(United Kingdom) Sebastian Perez											9		0	2
64	(Italy) Alberto Dall'Era												9	0	2
65	(United Kingdom) Tom Williams	10												0	1
66	(Italy) Pablo Biolghini					10							15	0	1
67	(Belgium) Kris Princen								10					0	1
68	(Greece) Panagiotis Hatzitsopanis									10				0	1
69	(Italy) Marco Roncoroni												10	0	1
70	(Greece) Lambros Athanassoulas									12^{5}				0	1
Pos.	Driver	MON (Monaco)	ARC (Finland)	CRO (Croatia)	POR (Portugal)	ITA (Italy)	KEN (Kenya)	EST (Estonia)	BEL (Belgium)	GRC (Greece)	FIN (Finland)	ESP (Spain)	MNZ (Italy)	Drops	Points

Key
Colour	Result
Gold	Winner
Silver	2nd place
Bronze	3rd place
Green	Points finish
Blue	Non-points finish
Blue	Non-classified finish (NC)
Purple	Did not finish (Ret)
Black	Excluded (EX)
Black	Disqualified (DSQ)
White	Did not start (DNS)
White	Cancelled (C)
Blank	Withdrew entry from the event (WD)

Notes:
^{1 2 3 4 5} – Power Stage position
italics – Non-scoring result

=== FIA WRC3 Championship for Co-Drivers ===
Pos.	Co-Driver	MON (Monaco)	ARC (Finland)	CRO (Croatia)	POR (Portugal)	ITA (Italy)	KEN (Kenya)	EST (Estonia)	BEL (Belgium)	GRC (Greece)	FIN (Finland)	ESP (Spain)	MNZ (Italy)	Points
1	(Poland) Maciek Szczepaniak			1^{3}	1^{3}	(8^{2})		2		1^{1}		2^{1}	(3^{3})	127
2	(France) Alexandre Coria			3^{1}	2^{2}	1^{3}			1^{2}	DSQ				99
3	(United Kingdom) Ross Whittock			5^{5}	3^{4}	Ret				2^{3}		4^{3}	8^{4}	70
4	(France) Yannick Roche	3^{1}		4^{2}	4^{5}	6								57
5	(Finland) Reeta Hämäläinen				10^{1}	Ret		Ret		3^{2}	1^{3}			53
6	(Finland) Topi Luhtinen		3					3^{5}			2^{5}	10		51
7	(Spain) Carlos del Barrio		(13)	6	6	4		6^{1}		(9^{4})		6		47
8	(Estonia) Silver Simm		2^{1}		Ret	12^{1}		10^{3}			6^{1}			45
9	(Finland) Mikael Korhonen		Ret	2^{4}							3^{4}			37
10	(Republic of Ireland) James Fulton								5			3^{4}	6^{5}	36
11	(Spain) Borja Odriozola							4^{2}	WD		4^{2}			32
12	(United Kingdom) Drew Sturrock						1^{1}							30
13	(Finland) Emil Lindholm											1^{2}		29
14	(Italy) Pietro Ometto												1^{2}	29
15	(Finland) Marko Salminen		1^{3}								Ret			28
16	(France) Benoît Fulcrand	1^{3}												28
17	Yaroslav Fedorov							1						25
18	(Estonia) Andrus Toom		6		11			5			7			24
19	(France) Jacques-Julien Renucci												2^{1}	23
20	(France) Banjamin Boulloud	2^{2}												22
21	(Spain) Diego Vallejo					2^{4}								20
22	(Kenya) Tauseef Khan						2^{4}							20
23	(Belgium) Louis Louka								9^{1}				4	19
24	(Belgium) Jasper Vermeulen								2					18
25	(Kenya) Tim Jessop						3^{3}							18
26	(Belgium) Filip Cuvelier								3^{4}					17
27	(Germany) Ella Kremer					7						5^{5}		17
28	(Spain) Rodrigo Sanjuan de Eusebio		20		Ret	3^{5}						Ret		16
29	(Poland) Kamil Heller						4^{2}							16
30	(Argentina) Rubén García				13	5		8^{4}						16
31	(Belgium) Jérôme Humblet	5^{5}		Ret					8^{5}					16
32	(Austria) Bernhard Ettel	4^{4}	Ret	Ret										14
33	(Finland) Antti Linnaketo		4^{5}								Ret			13
34	(France) François Gilbert								4					12
35	(Greece) Marios Tsaousoglou									4				12
36	(Sweden) Emil Bergkvist		5^{4}											12
37	(Austria) Ilka Minor	7		7										12
38	(Italy) Luca Beltrame	Ret	21	8		9						7	11	12
39	(Italy) Giorgia Ascalone	10											5	11
40	(Kenya) Azhar Bhatti						5^{5}							11
41	(United Kingdom) Keaton Williams				5									10
42	(Greece) Konstantinos Nikolopoulos									5				10
43	(Finland) Markus Soininen										5			10
44	(Belgium) Johan Jalet								7^{3}					9
45	(Belgium) Kris D'Alleine	6							14					8
46	(Lithuania) Aisvydas Paliukėnas		18					6						8
47	(Belgium) Pieter Vyncke								6					8
48	(Greece) Ioannis Velanis									6				8
49	(Brazil) Gabriel Morales									7	10			7
50	(Finland) Markus Silfvast		7											6
51	(Portugal) Luís Ramalho				7									6
52	(Italy) Mauro Turati												7	6
53	(Sweden) Patrik Barth		10^{2}											5
54	(Spain) Marc Martí				8	Ret								4
55	(Italy) Lorenzo Granai	8												4
56	(Finland) Kari Kallio		8											4
57	(Greece) Alkiviadis Rentis									8				4
58	(Czech Republic) Karolína Jugasová										8			4
59	(United Kingdom) Michael Gibson											8		4
60	(Spain) Diego Sanjuan de Eusebio	11						9		11	12	Ret		2
61	(Belgium) Stéphane Prévot	9												2
62	(Poland) Maciek Baran		9											2
63	(Austria) Gerald Winter			9										2
64	(Portugal) Vítor Hugo				9									2
65	(Finland) Jarno Metso										9			2
66	(United States) Gary McElhinney											9		2
67	(Italy) Edoardo Brovelli												9	2
68	(Belgium) Thomas Walbrecq			10										1
69	(Italy) Stefano Pudda					10								1
70	(Belgium) Peter Kaspers								10					1
71	(Greece) Nikolaos Petropoulos									10				1
72	(Italy) Paolo Brusadelli												10	1
73	(Greece) Nikolaos Zakheos									12^{5}				1
Pos.	Co-Driver	MON (Monaco)	ARC (Finland)	CRO (Croatia)	POR (Portugal)	ITA (Italy)	KEN (Kenya)	EST (Estonia)	BEL (Belgium)	GRC (Greece)	FIN (Finland)	ESP (Spain)	MNZ (Italy)	Points

Key
Colour	Result
Gold	Winner
Silver	2nd place
Bronze	3rd place
Green	Points finish
Blue	Non-points finish
Blue	Non-classified finish (NC)
Purple	Did not finish (Ret)
Black	Excluded (EX)
Black	Disqualified (DSQ)
White	Did not start (DNS)
White	Cancelled (C)
Blank	Withdrew entry from the event (WD)

Notes:
^{1 2 3 4 5} – Power Stage position
(res) – Result is non scoring
