= 2021 Safari Rally =

69th edition of Kenyan automobile rally

2021 Safari Rally Safari Rally Kenya 2021
Round 6 of 12 in the 2021 World Rally Championship
← Previous event	Next event →
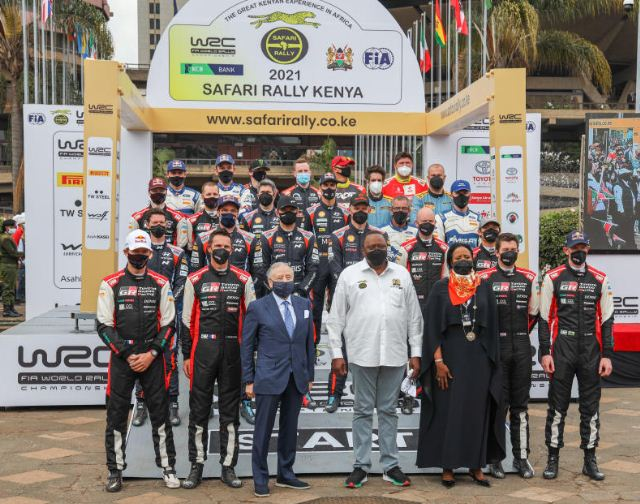
- The opening ceremony of the rally.
- Host country: Kenya
- Rally base: Nairobi, Nairobi County
- Dates run: 24 – 27 June 2021
- Start location: Kasarani, Nairobi
- Finish location: Hell's Gate National Park, Naivasha
- Stages: 18 (320.19 km; 198.96 miles)
- Stage surface: Gravel
- Transport distance: 813.17 km (505.28 miles)
- Overall distance: 1,133.94 km (704.60 miles)

Statistics
- Crews registered: 58
- Crews: 52 at start, 26 at finish

Overall results
- Overall winner: (France) Sébastien Ogier (France) Julien Ingrassia (Japan) Toyota Gazoo Racing WRT; 3:18:11.3
- Power Stage winner: (Estonia) Ott Tänak (Estonia) Martin Järveoja (South Korea) Hyundai Shell Mobis WRT; 6:06.4

Support category results
- WRC-2 winner: no classified finishers
- WRC-3 winner: (Kenya) Onkar Rai (United Kingdom) Drew Sturrock; 3:47:37.7

The 2021 Safari Rally (also known as the Safari Rally Kenya 2021) was a motor racing event for rally cars that was held over four days between 24 and 27 June 2021. It marked the sixty-ninth running of the Safari Rally. The event was the sixth round of the 2021 World Rally Championship, World Rally Championship-2 and World Rally Championship-3. The 2021 event was based in Nairobi in the Nairobi County and was contested over eighteen special stages totalling 320.19 km (198.96 mi) in competitive distance.

Sébastien Ogier and Julien Ingrassia won the rally. Their team, Toyota Gazoo Racing WRT, were the manufacturer's winners. There were no classified finishers in the World Rally Championship-2 category. Local hero Onkar Rai and Drew Sturrock won the World Rally Championship-3 category.

At the age of ninety-one, Polish driver Sobiesław Zasada became the oldest competitor to start a World Rally Championship event.

== Background ==
=== Championship standings prior to the event ===
Reigning World Champions Sébastien Ogier and Julien Ingrassia entered the round with an eleven-point lead over Elfyn Evans and Scott Martin. Thierry Neuville and Martijn Wydaeghe were third, a further eighteen points behind. In the World Rally Championship for Manufacturers, Toyota Gazoo Racing WRT held a massive a forty-nine-point lead over defending manufacturers' champions Hyundai Shell Mobis WRT, followed by M-Sport Ford WRT.

In the World Rally Championship-2 standings, Andreas Mikkelsen and Ola Fløene held a two-point lead ahead of Mads Østberg and Torstein Eriksen in the drivers' and co-drivers' standings respectively, with Marco Bulacia Wilkinson and Marcelo Der Ohannesian in third. In the teams' championship, Movisport and Toksport WRT co-led the championship, with M-Sport Ford WRT in third.

In the World Rally Championship-3 standings, Yohan Rossel and Alexandre Coria lead drivers' and co-drivers' championship respectively. Kajetan Kajetanowicz and Maciek Szczepaniak were second, trailed by Nicolas Ciamin and Yannick Roche.

=== Entry list ===
The following crews entered the rally. The event was opened to crews competing in the World Rally Championship, its support categories, the World Rally Championship-2 and World Rally Championship-3, and privateer entries that are not registered to score points in any championship. Eleven entries for the World Rally Championship were received, as were four in the World Rally Championship-2 and six in the World Rally Championship-3.

Rally1 entries competing in the World Rally Championship
No.	Driver	Co-Driver	Entrant	Car	Tyre
1	(France) Sébastien Ogier	(France) Julien Ingrassia	(Japan) Toyota Gazoo Racing WRT	Toyota Yaris WRC	P
2	(Sweden) Oliver Solberg	(Republic of Ireland) Aaron Johnston	(France) Hyundai 2C Competition	Hyundai i20 Coupe WRC	P
6	(Spain) Dani Sordo	(Spain) Borja Rozada	(South Korea) Hyundai Shell Mobis WRT	Hyundai i20 Coupe WRC	P
7	(France) Pierre-Louis Loubet	(France) Florian Haut-Labourdette	(France) Hyundai 2C Competition	Hyundai i20 Coupe WRC	—N/a
8	(Estonia) Ott Tänak	(Estonia) Martin Järveoja	(South Korea) Hyundai Shell Mobis WRT	Hyundai i20 Coupe WRC	P
11	(Belgium) Thierry Neuville	(Belgium) Martijn Wydaeghe	(South Korea) Hyundai Shell Mobis WRT	Hyundai i20 Coupe WRC	P
16	(France) Adrien Fourmaux	(Belgium) Renaud Jamoul	(United Kingdom) M-Sport Ford WRT	Ford Fiesta WRC	P
18	(Japan) Takamoto Katsuta	(United Kingdom) Daniel Barritt	(Japan) Toyota Gazoo Racing WRT	Toyota Yaris WRC	P
33	(United Kingdom) Elfyn Evans	(United Kingdom) Scott Martin	(Japan) Toyota Gazoo Racing WRT	Toyota Yaris WRC	P
37	(Italy) Lorenzo Bertelli	(Italy) Simone Scattolin	(United Kingdom) M-Sport Ford WRT	Ford Fiesta WRC	P
44	(United Kingdom) Gus Greensmith	(Republic of Ireland) Chris Patterson	(United Kingdom) M-Sport Ford WRT	Ford Fiesta WRC	P
69	(Finland) Kalle Rovanperä	(Finland) Jonne Halttunen	(Japan) Toyota Gazoo Racing WRT	Toyota Yaris WRC	P

Rally2 entries competing in the World Rally Championship-2
No.	Driver	Co-Driver	Entrant	Car	Tyre
20	(Norway) Andreas Mikkelsen	(Norway) Ola Fløene	(Germany) Toksport WRT	Škoda Fabia R5 Evo	—N/a
21	(Bolivia) Marco Bulacia Wilkinson	(Argentina) Marcelo Der Ohannesian	(Germany) Toksport WRT	Škoda Fabia R5 Evo	—N/a
22	(Finland) Teemu Suninen	(Finland) Mikko Markkula	(United Kingdom) M-Sport Ford WRT	Ford Fiesta R5 Mk. II	—N/a
23	(Czech Republic) Martin Prokop	(Czech Republic) Zdeněk Jůrka	(United Kingdom) M-Sport Ford WRT	Ford Fiesta R5 Mk. II	P

Rally2 entries competing in the World Rally Championship-3 (Note: Under the Sporting Regulations, each car competing in the World Rally Championship-3 is entered under the driver's name.)
No.	Driver	Co-Driver	Entrant	Car	Tyre
24	(Kenya) Onkar Rai	(United Kingdom) Drew Sturrock	(Kenya) Onkar Rai	Volkswagen Polo GTI R5	P
25	(Kenya) Carl Tundo	(Kenya) Tim Jessop	(Kenya) Carl Tundo	Volkswagen Polo GTI R5	P
26	(Kenya) Tejveer Rai	(Zimbabwe) Gareth Dawe	(Kenya) Tejveer Rai	Volkswagen Polo GTI R5	P
27	(Kenya) Karan Patel	(Kenya) Tauseef Khan	(Kenya) Karan Patel	Ford Fiesta R5	P
28	(Kenya) Aakif Virani	(Kenya) Azhar Bhatti	(Kenya) Aakif Virani	Škoda Fabia R5	P
29	(Poland) Daniel Chwist	(Poland) Kamil Heller	(Poland) Daniel Chwist	Ford Fiesta R5 Mk. II	P

Other major entries
No.	Driver	Co-Driver	Entrant	Car	Tyre
36	(Poland) Sobiesław Zasada	(Poland) Tomasz Borysławski	M-Sport Poland	Ford Fiesta Rally3	P

=== Route ===
==== Itinerary ====
All dates and times are EAT (UTC+3).

Leg	Date	Time	No.	Stage name	Distance
—N/a	23 June	13:01	—	Loldia [Shakedown]	2.89 km
1	24 June	14:08	SS1	Super Special Kasarani	4.84 km
1	25 June	08:09	SS2	Chui Lodge 1	13.34 km
1	25 June	09:05	SS3	Kedong 1	32.68 km
1	25 June	10:18	SS4	Oserian 1	18.87 km
1	25 June	13:46	SS5	Chui Lodge 2	13.34 km
1	25 June	14:42	SS6	Kedong 2	32.68 km
1	25 June	15:55	SS7	Oserian 2	18.87 km
2	26 June	08:08	SS8	Elmenteita 1	14.67 km
2	26 June	09:08	SS9	Soysambu 1	20.33 km
2	26 June	10:22	SS10	Sleeping Warrior 1	31.04 km
2	26 June	14:05	SS11	Elmenteita 2	14.67 km
2	26 June	15:08	SS12	Soysambu 2	20.33 km
2	26 June	16:22	SS13	Sleeping Warrior 2	31.04 km
3	27 June	07:26	SS14	Loldia 1	11.33 km
3	27 June	08:38	SS15	Hell's Gate 1	10.56 km
3	27 June	10:45	SS16	Malewa	9.71 km
3	27 June	11:25	SS17	Loldia 2	11.33 km
3	27 June	13:18	SS18	Hell's Gate 2 [Power Stage]	10.56 km

== Report ==
=== World Rally Cars ===
==== Classification ====
Position		No.	Driver	Co-driver	Entrant	Car	Time	Difference	Points	
Event	Class	No.	Driver	Co-driver	Entrant	Car	Time	Difference	Event	Stage
1	1	1	Sébastien Ogier	Julien Ingrassia	Toyota Gazoo Racing WRT	Toyota Yaris WRC	3:18:11.3	0.0	25	2
2	2	18	Takamoto Katsuta	Daniel Barritt	Toyota Gazoo Racing WRT	Toyota Yaris WRC	3:18:33.1	+21.8	18	0
3	3	8	Ott Tänak	Martin Järveoja	Hyundai Shell Mobis WRT	Hyundai i20 Coupe WRC	3:19:20.8	+1:09.5	15	5
4	4	44	Gus Greensmith	Chris Patterson	M-Sport Ford WRT	Ford Fiesta WRC	3:20:05.9	+1:54.6	10	0
5	5	16	Adrien Fourmaux	Renaud Jamoul	M-Sport Ford WRT	Ford Fiesta WRC	3:20:06.0	+1:54.7	12	0
6	6	69	Kalle Rovanperä	Jonne Halttunen	Toyota Gazoo Racing WRT	Toyota Yaris WRC	3:29:04.7	+10:53.4	8	4
10	7	33	Elfyn Evans	Scott Martin	Toyota Gazoo Racing WRT	Toyota Yaris WRC	4:07:34.0	+49:22.7	1	3
11	8	37	Lorenzo Bertelli	Simone Scattolin	M-Sport Ford WRT	Ford Fiesta WRC	4:08:28.3	+50:17.0	0	0
12	9	6	Dani Sordo	Borja Rozada	Hyundai Shell Mobis WRT	Hyundai i20 Coupe WRC	4:21:30.8	+1:03:19.5	0	1
Retired SS15		11	Thierry Neuville	Martijn Wydaeghe	Hyundai Shell Mobis WRT	Hyundai i20 Coupe WRC	Damper		0	0
Retired SS5		2	Oliver Solberg	Aaron Johnston	Hyundai 2C Competition	Hyundai i20 Coupe WRC	Roll cage		0	0
Did not start		7	Pierre-Louis Loubet	Florian Haut-Labourdette	Hyundai 2C Competition	Hyundai i20 Coupe WRC	Crew swap		0	0

==== Special stages ====
Day	Stage	Stage name	Length	Winners	Car	Time	Class leaders
23 June	—	Loldia [Shakedown]	2.89 km	Ogier / Ingrassia	Toyota Yaris WRC	3:42.6	—N/a
24 June	SS1	Super Special Kasarani	4.84 km	Ogier / Ingrassia	Toyota Yaris WRC	3:21.5	Ogier / Ingrassia
25 June	SS2	Chui Lodge 1	13.34 km	Neuville / Wydaeghe	Hyundai i20 Coupe WRC	9:47.7	Neuville / Wydaeghe
25 June	SS3	Kedong 1	32.68 km	Neuville / Wydaeghe	Hyundai i20 Coupe WRC	16:52.3	Neuville / Wydaeghe
25 June	SS4	Oserian 1	18.87 km	Rovanperä / Halttunen	Toyota Yaris WRC	12:39.3	Neuville / Wydaeghe
25 June	SS5	Chui Lodge 2	13.34 km	Rovanperä / Halttunen	Toyota Yaris WRC	9:59.9	Rovanperä / Halttunen
25 June	SS6	Kedong 2	32.68 km	Neuville / Wydaeghe	Hyundai i20 Coupe WRC	16:52.1	Neuville / Wydaeghe
25 June	SS7	Oserian 2	18.87 km	Ogier / Ingrassia; Katsuta / Barritt	Toyota Yaris WRC; Toyota Yaris WRC	12:52.1	Neuville / Wydaeghe
26 June	SS8	Elmenteita 1	14.67 km	Neuville / Wydaeghe	Hyundai i20 Coupe WRC	9:01.4	Neuville / Wydaeghe
26 June	SS9	Soysambu 1	20.33 km	Ogier / Ingrassia	Toyota Yaris WRC	14:11.9	Neuville / Wydaeghe
26 June	SS10	Sleeping Warrior 1	31.04 km	Ogier / Ingrassia	Toyota Yaris WRC	17:26.6	Neuville / Wydaeghe
26 June	SS11	Elmenteita 2	14.67 km	Ogier / Ingrassia	Toyota Yaris WRC	8:47.5	Neuville / Wydaeghe
26 June	SS12	Soysambu 2	20.33 km	Tänak / Järveoja	Hyundai i20 Coupe WRC	13:52.7	Neuville / Wydaeghe
26 June	SS13	Sleeping Warrior 2	31.04 km	Sordo / Rozada	Hyundai i20 Coupe WRC	17:25.0	Neuville / Wydaeghe
27 June	SS14	Loldia 1	11.33 km	Ogier / Ingrassia	Toyota Yaris WRC	7:37.1	Neuville / Wydaeghe
27 June	SS15	Hell's Gate 1	10.56 km	Evans / Martin	Toyota Yaris WRC	3:14.3	Katsuta / Barritt
27 June	SS16	Malewa	9.71 km	Fourmaux / Jamoul	Ford Fiesta WRC	7:01.1	Ogier / Ingrassia; Katsuta / Barritt
27 June	SS17	Loldia 2	11.33 km	Ogier / Ingrassia	Toyota Yaris WRC	7:35.0	Ogier / Ingrassia
27 June	SS18	Hell's Gate 2 [Power Stage]	10.56 km	Tänak / Järveoja	Hyundai i20 Coupe WRC	6:06.4	Ogier / Ingrassia

==== Championship standings ====
Pos.	Drivers' championships			Co-drivers' championships			Manufacturers' championships		
Pos.	Move	Driver	Points	Move	Co-driver	Points	Move	Manufacturer	Points
1		Sébastien Ogier	133		Julien Ingrassia	133		Toyota Gazoo Racing WRT	273
2		Elfyn Evans	99		Scott Martin	99		Hyundai Shell Mobis WRT	214
3		Thierry Neuville	77		Martijn Wydaeghe	77		M-Sport Ford WRT	109
4		Ott Tänak	69		Martin Järveoja	69		Hyundai 2C Competition	28
5		Takamoto Katsuta	66		Daniel Barritt	66			

=== World Rally Championship-2 ===
==== Classification ====
Position		No.	Driver	Co-driver	Entrant	Car	Time	Difference	Points		
Event	Class	No.	Driver	Co-driver	Entrant	Car	Time	Difference	Class	Stage	Event
Retired SS6		23	Martin Prokop	Zdeněk Jůrka	M-Sport Ford WRT	Ford Fiesta R5 Mk. II	Crash		0	0	0
Did not start		20	Andreas Mikkelsen	Ola Fløene	Toksport WRT	Škoda Fabia R5 Evo	Withdrawn		0	0	0
Did not start		21	Marco Bulacia Wilkinson	Marcelo Der Ohannesian	Toksport WRT	Škoda Fabia R5 Evo	Withdrawn		0	0	0
Did not start		22	Teemu Suninen	Mikko Markkula	M-Sport Ford WRT	Ford Fiesta R5 Mk. II	Withdrawn		0	0	0

==== Special stages ====
Day	Stage	Stage name	Length	Winners	Car	Time	Class leaders
23 June	—	Loldia [Shakedown]	2.89 km	Prokop / Jůrka	Ford Fiesta R5 Mk. II	4:17.9	—N/a
24 June	SS1	Super Special Kasarani	4.84 km	Prokop / Jůrka	Ford Fiesta R5 Mk. II	3:39.6	Prokop / Jůrka
25 June	SS2	Chui Lodge 1	13.34 km	Prokop / Jůrka	Ford Fiesta R5 Mk. II	11:05.9	Prokop / Jůrka
25 June	SS3	Kedong 1	32.68 km	Prokop / Jůrka	Ford Fiesta R5 Mk. II	19:40.1	Prokop / Jůrka
25 June	SS4	Oserian 1	18.87 km	Prokop / Jůrka	Ford Fiesta R5 Mk. II	14:12.2	Prokop / Jůrka
25 June	SS5	Chui Lodge 2	13.34 km	Prokop / Jůrka	Ford Fiesta R5 Mk. II	11:15.5	Prokop / Jůrka
25 June	SS6	Kedong 2	32.68 km	No stage winners		—N/a	No leaders
25 June	SS7	Oserian 2	18.87 km	No stage winners		—N/a	No leaders
26 June	SS8	Elmenteita 1	14.67 km	No stage winners		—N/a	No leaders
26 June	SS9	Soysambu 1	20.33 km	No stage winners		—N/a	No leaders
26 June	SS10	Sleeping Warrior 1	31.04 km	No stage winners		—N/a	No leaders
26 June	SS11	Elmenteita 2	14.67 km	No stage winners		—N/a	No leaders
26 June	SS12	Soysambu 2	20.33 km	No stage winners		—N/a	No leaders
26 June	SS13	Sleeping Warrior 2	31.04 km	No stage winners		—N/a	No leaders
27 June	SS14	Loldia 1	11.33 km	No stage winners		—N/a	No leaders
27 June	SS15	Hell's Gate 1	10.56 km	No stage winners		—N/a	No leaders
27 June	SS16	Malewa	9.71 km	No stage winners		—N/a	No leaders
27 June	SS17	Loldia 2	11.33 km	No stage winners		—N/a	No leaders
27 June	SS18	Hell's Gate 2 [Power Stage]	10.56 km	No stage winners		—N/a	No leaders

==== Championship standings ====
Pos.	Drivers' championships			Co-drivers' championships			Teams' championships		
Pos.	Move	Driver	Points	Move	Co-driver	Points	Move	Manufacturer	Points
1		Andreas Mikkelsen	68		Ola Fløene	68		Toksport WRT	125
2		Mads Østberg	66		Torstein Eriksen	66		Movisport	125
3		Marco Bulacia Wilkinson	63		Marcelo Der Ohannesian	63		M-Sport Ford WRT	104
4		Esapekka Lappi	59		Janne Ferm	59		Hyundai Motorsport N	12
5		Teemu Suninen	41		Mikko Markkula	41			

=== World Rally Championship-3 ===
==== Classification ====
Position		No.	Driver	Co-driver	Entrant	Car	Time	Difference	Points		
Event	Class	No.	Driver	Co-driver	Entrant	Car	Time	Difference	Class	Stage	Event
7	1	24	Onkar Rai	Drew Sturrock	Onkar Rai	Volkswagen Polo GTI R5	3:47:37.7	0.0	25	5	6
8	2	27	Karan Patel	Tauseef Khan	Karan Patel	Ford Fiesta R5	3:51:41.7	+4:04.0	18	2	4
9	3	25	Carl Tundo	Tim Jessop	Carl Tundo	Volkswagen Polo GTI R5	3:54:52.0	+7:14.3	15	3	2
17	4	29	Daniel Chwist	Kamil Heller	Daniel Chwist	Ford Fiesta R5 Mk. II	4:37:20.4	+49:42.7	12	4	0
22	5	28	Aakif Virani	Azhar Bhatti	Aakif Virani	Škoda Fabia R5	5:12:17.6	+1:24:39.9	10	1	0
Retired SS3		26	Tejveer Rai	Gareth Dawe	Tejveer Rai	Volkswagen Polo GTI R5	Rolled		0	0	0

==== Special stages ====
Day	Stage	Stage name	Length	Winners	Car	Time	Class leaders
23 June	—	Loldia [Shakedown]	2.89 km	Rai / Sturrock	Volkswagen Polo GTI R5	4:07.6	—N/a
24 June	SS1	Super Special Kasarani	4.84 km	Patel / Khan	Ford Fiesta R5	3:42.6	Patel / Khan
25 June	SS2	Chui Lodge 1	13.34 km	Rai / Sturrock	Volkswagen Polo GTI R5	11:01.1	Rai / Sturrock
25 June	SS3	Kedong 1	32.68 km	Tundo / Jessop	Volkswagen Polo GTI R5	19:36.1	Rai / Sturrock
25 June	SS4	Oserian 1	18.87 km	Rai / Sturrock	Volkswagen Polo GTI R5	14:41.9	Rai / Sturrock
25 June	SS5	Chui Lodge 2	13.34 km	Rai / Sturrock	Volkswagen Polo GTI R5	11:39.0	Rai / Sturrock
25 June	SS6	Kedong 2	32.68 km	Stage cancelled			
25 June	SS7	Oserian 2	18.87 km	Stage cancelled			
26 June	SS8	Elmenteita 1	14.67 km	Tundo / Jessop	Volkswagen Polo GTI R5	9:42.4	Rai / Sturrock
26 June	SS9	Soysambu 1	20.33 km	Rai / Sturrock	Volkswagen Polo GTI R5	15:51.6	Rai / Sturrock
26 June	SS10	Sleeping Warrior 1	31.04 km	Rai / Sturrock	Volkswagen Polo GTI R5	20:10.3	Rai / Sturrock
26 June	SS11	Elmenteita 2	14.67 km	Tundo / Jessop	Volkswagen Polo GTI R5	9:56.1	Rai / Sturrock
26 June	SS12	Soysambu 2	20.33 km	Tundo / Jessop	Volkswagen Polo GTI R5	15:27.9	Rai / Sturrock
26 June	SS13	Sleeping Warrior 2	31.04 km	Tundo / Jessop	Volkswagen Polo GTI R5	21:05.5	Rai / Sturrock
27 June	SS14	Loldia 1	11.33 km	Tundo / Jessop	Volkswagen Polo GTI R5	8:32.5	Rai / Sturrock
27 June	SS15	Hell's Gate 1	10.56 km	Chwist / Heller	Ford Fiesta R5 Mk. II	3:50.2	Rai / Sturrock
27 June	SS16	Malewa	9.71 km	Tundo / Jessop	Volkswagen Polo GTI R5	7:58.5	Rai / Sturrock
27 June	SS17	Loldia 2	11.33 km	Tundo / Jessop	Volkswagen Polo GTI R5	8:27.6	Rai / Sturrock
27 June	SS18	Hell's Gate 2 [Power Stage]	10.56 km	Rai / Sturrock	Volkswagen Polo GTI R5	7:10.7	Rai / Sturrock

==== Championship standings ====
Pos.	Drivers' championships			Co-drivers' championships		
Pos.	Move	Driver	Points	Move	Co-driver	Points
1		Yohan Rossel	98		Alexandre Coria	70
2		Kajetan Kajetanowicz	64		Maciek Szczepaniak	64
3		Nicolas Ciamin	57		Yannick Roche	57
4	New entry	Onkar Rai	30	New entry	Drew Sturrock	30
5	1	Teemu Asunmaa	28	1	Benoît Fulcrand	28

== Notes ==
Previous rally: 2021 Rally Italia Sardegna	2021 FIA World Rally Championship	Next rally: 2021 Rally Estonia
Previous rally: 2002 Safari Rally; 2020 edition cancelled	2021 Safari Rally	Next rally: 2022 Safari Rally
