= Volkswagen Polo GTI R5 =

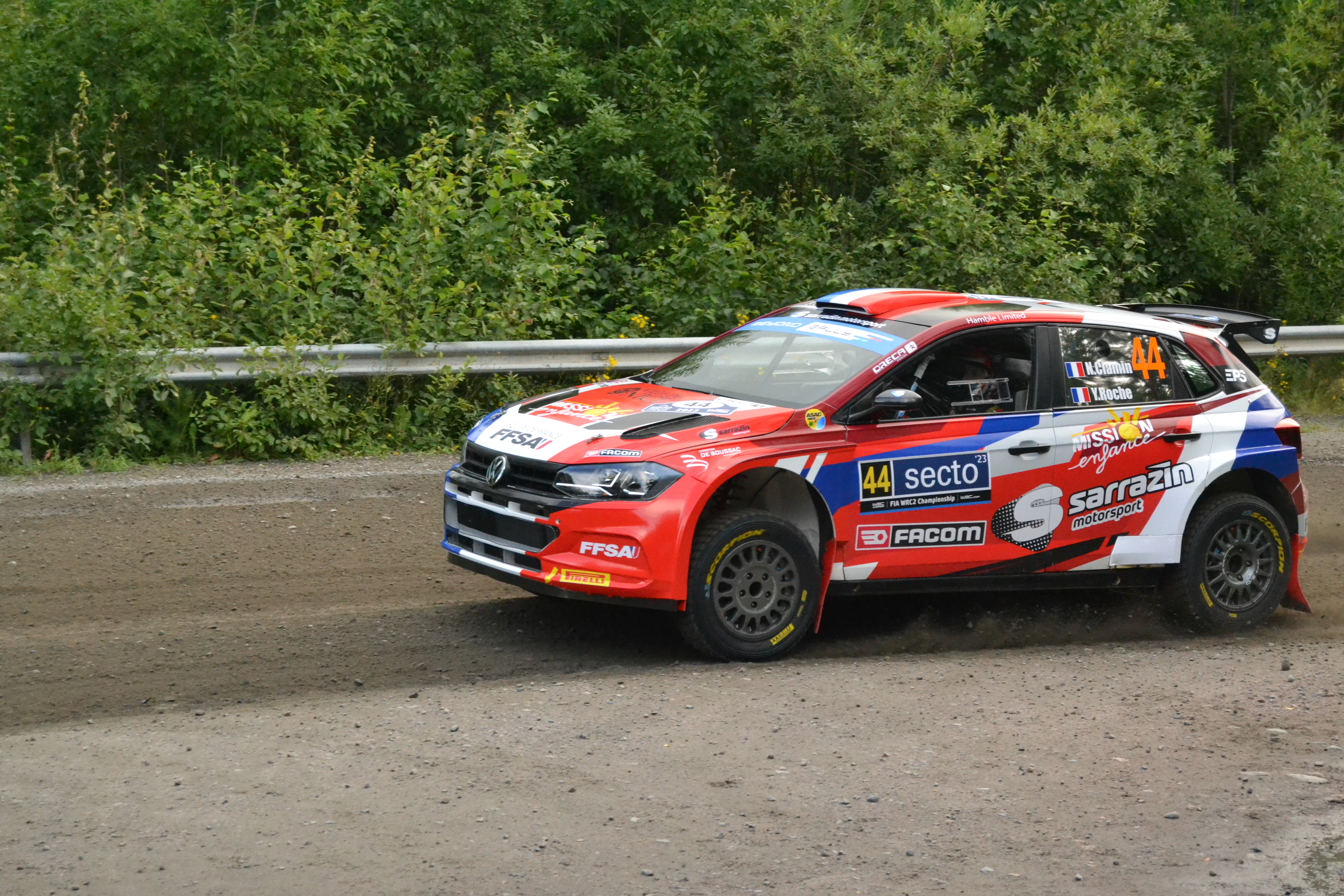

Overview
- Manufacturer: Volkswagen R Motorsport
- Model years: 2018–present

Body and chassis
- Class: R5
- Layout: Front-engine, four-wheel drive
- Platform: Volkswagen Polo
- Related: Volkswagen Polo R WRC

Powertrain
- Engine: 1.60 L (98 cu in) transversely-mounted turbocharged inline-4 16-valve

Chronology
- Predecessor: Volkswagen Polo R WRC

The Volkswagen Polo GTI R5 is a rally car built by Volkswagen Motorsport and based upon the Volkswagen Polo road car. It is built to R5 regulations and is a successor to the Volkswagen Polo R WRC. The Polo GTI R5 made its competitive début at the 2018 Rally Catalunya, where it was driven by 2003 World Drivers' Champion Petter Solberg and Eric Camilli. The car currently competes in the World Rally Championship-2 where it is entered by various privateers.

== History ==
After four years of extremely dominant success in the outright category of the WRC with the Volkswagen Polo R WRC, in 2016 Volkswagen Motorsport began development of a new Polo WRC for the 2017-specification regulations. Despite extensive testing undertaken with the car, in November 2016 Volkswagen announced they would cancel development of the new Polo, along with a withdrawal from the World Rally Championship. In April of 2017, however, Volkswagen announced intentions to remain in the sport, with plans to develop the new Volkswagen Polo GTI for the R5 class, to be used mostly in the hands of privateer drivers in the World Rally Championship-2.

The R5 Polo was developed in collaboration with Skoda, one of Volkswagen's subsidiaries, who also had an R5 car of their own, based on the Skoda Fabia. In December of 2017, Volkswagen officially unveiled the R5-specification Volkswagen Polo GTI. The car's engine developed 272 brake horsepower from 1.6 litres. Volkswagen's plans were to have the first completed model passing international homologation by the summer of 2018, and begin delivery to customers soon afterwards.

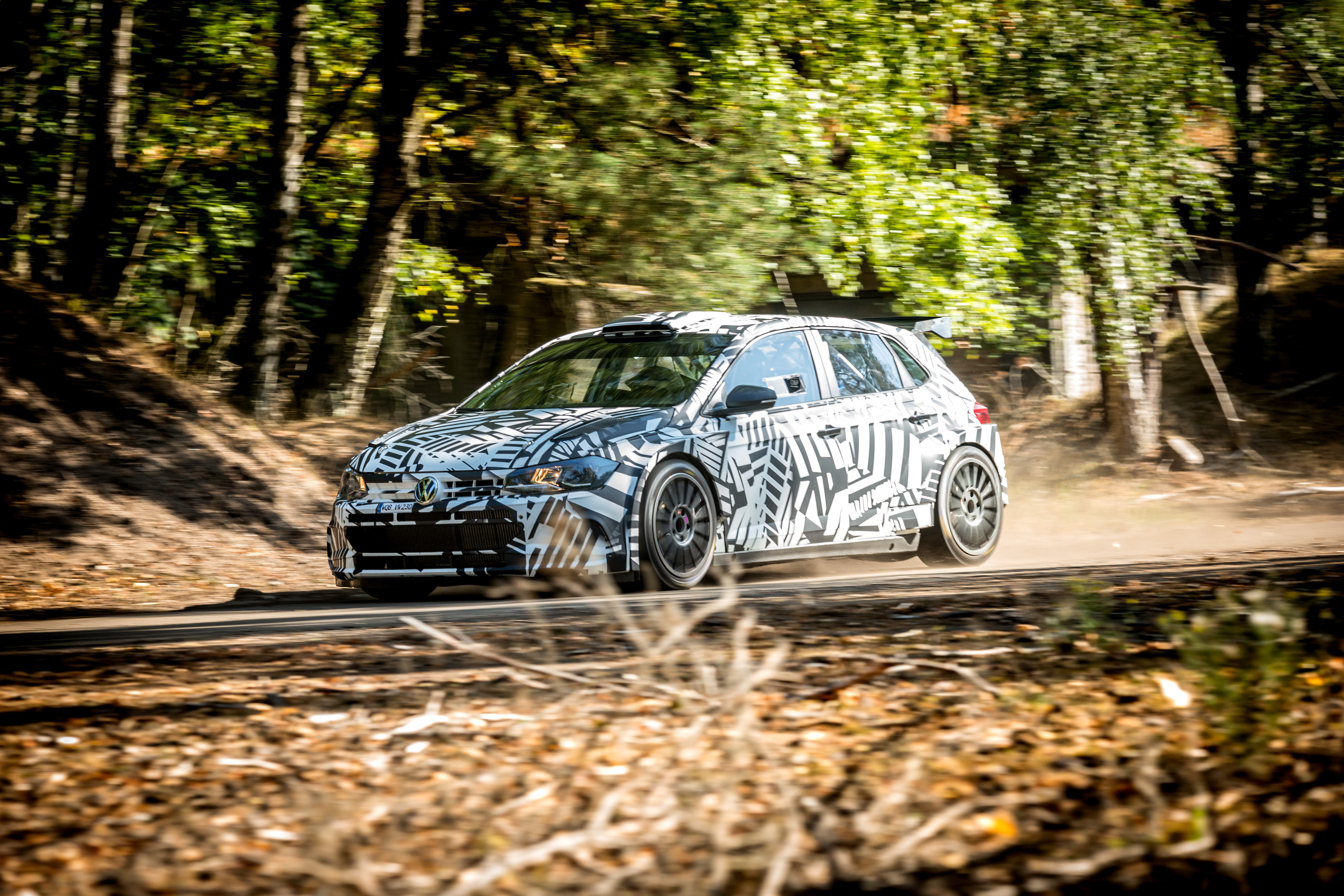

Shortly afterwards, Volkswagen confirmed fifteen cars had been ordered by various European and South American customers. Austrian rally team BRR Baumschlager Rallye & Racing had purchased three of them, with other cars going to other high-end teams such as Printsport and Kristoffersson Motorsport.

== Results ==
=== World Rally Championship-2 victories ===
No.	Event	Year	Driver	Co-driver
1	2019 Rally Sweden	2019	(Norway) Ole Christian Veiby	(Sweden) Jonas Andersson
2	(United Kingdom) 2019 Wales Rally GB	2019	(Norway) Petter Solberg	(United Kingdom) Phil Mills
3	(Finland) 2021 Arctic Rally	2021	(Finland) Esapekka Lappi	(Finland) Janne Ferm
4	2021 Rally de Portugal	2021	(Finland) Esapekka Lappi	(Finland) Janne Ferm
5	2021 Rally Finland	2021	(Finland) Teemu Suninen	(Finland) Mikko Markkula

=== World Rally Championship-3 victories ===
No.	Event	Year	Driver	Co-driver
1	2020 Rally Estonia	2020	(Sweden) Oliver Solberg	(Republic of Ireland) Aaron Johnston
2	(Kenya) 2021 Safari Rally	2021	(Kenya) Onkar Rai	(United Kingdom) Drew Sturrock

=== European Rally Championship victories ===
No.	Event	Year	Driver	Co-driver
1	(Latvia) 2019 Rally Liepāja	2019	(Norway) Oliver Solberg	(United Kingdom) Aaron Johnston
2	2019 Cyprus Rally	2019	(Qatar) Nasser Al-Attiyah	(France) Mathieu Baumel
3	(Latvia) 2020 Rally Liepāja	2020	(Sweden) Oliver Solberg	(Republic of Ireland) Aaron Johnston
4	(Latvia) 2021 Rally Liepāja	2021	(Latvia) Nikolay Gryazin	(Latvia) Konstantin Aleksandrov
5	(Portugal) 35.º Rally Serras de Fafe - Felgueiras - Cabreira e Boticas	2022	(Spain) Nil Solans	(Spain) Marc Martí
6	(Spain) 46.º Rally Islas Canarias	2022	(Spain) Nil Solans	(Spain) Marc Martí
7	(Sweden) 1. BAUHAUS Royal Rally of Scandinavia	2023	(Sweden) Oliver Solberg	(United Kingdom) Elliott Edmondson

== See also ==
- Volkswagen Polo R WRC
- Group R
  - Citroën C3 R5
  - Ford Fiesta R5
  - Hyundai i20 R5
  - Škoda Fabia R5
