= Onkar Rai =

Kenyan racing driver

Onkar Singh Rai
- Nationality: Kenyan
- Born: 29 May 1988 (age 38)

Awards
- 2021 2014: 2021 Safari Rally WRC-3 winner Simba Clubman Rally winner

Onkar Singh Rai (born 29 May 1988) is a Nakuru-based Kenyan rally driver who competes locally and internationally. The Premier class driver is a former Kenya National Division 2, and back-to-back Nakuru Rally Champion.

Rai participated in the 2021 Safari Rally and emerged the WRC3 champion on his way to a seventh overall place finish. He was navigated by British co-driver Drew Sturrock. Following the WRC3 win, Onkar was named the July 2021 Sports Personality of the month

His sibling Tejveer Rai, and cousins Rajbir Rai and Amanraaj Rai are also rally drivers.
