= Hyundai World Rally Championship results =

The table below shows all results of Hyundai Motorsport in World Rally Championship.

== FIA 2-Litre Cup for Manufacturers ==
Year	Car	Driver	1	2	3	4	5	6	7	8	9	10	11	12	13	14	2L MC	Points
1998	Hyundai Coupé Kit Car	(Sweden) Kenneth Eriksson	MON	SWE	KEN	POR; Ret	ESP; 7	FRA	ARG; Ret	GRE; Ret							5th	17
1998	Hyundai Coupé Kit Car Evo2	(Sweden) Kenneth Eriksson									NZL; 3	FIN; Ret	ITA; Ret	AUS; 3	GBR; Ret		5th	17
1998	Hyundai Coupé Kit Car	(Australia) Wayne Bell	MON	SWE	KEN	POR; 4	ESP	FRA	ARG	GRE; Ret							5th	17
1998	Hyundai Coupé Kit Car Evo2	(Australia) Wayne Bell									NZL; Ret	FIN; Ret	ITA; Ret	AUS; Ret	GBR; Ret		5th	17
1998	Hyundai Coupé Kit Car	(United Kingdom) Alister McRae	MON	SWE	KEN	POR	ESP; 6	FRA; 5	ARG	GRE	NZL	FIN	ITA	AUS	GBR		5th	17
1999	Hyundai Coupé Kit Car Evo2	(Sweden) Kenneth Eriksson	MON	SWE; Ret	KEN	POR; 2	ESP; Ret	FRA	ARG	GRE; 1	NZL; 1	FIN; Ret	CHN; 2	ITA; Ret	AUS; 1	GBR	2nd	95
1999	Hyundai Coupé Kit Car Evo2	(United Kingdom) Alister McRae	MON	SWE; Ret	KEN	POR; 1	ESP; Ret	FRA	ARG	GRE; Ret	NZL; 2	FIN; 3	CHN; 1	ITA; Ret	AUS; 3	GBR; Ret	2nd	95

== World Rally Championship ==
Year	Entrant	Car	No	Driver	1	2	3	4	5	6	7	8	9	10	11	12	13	14	WDC	Points	WMC	Points
2000	Hyundai Castrol World Rally Team	Hyundai Accent WRC	14	(Sweden) Kenneth Eriksson	MON	SWE; 13	KEN	POR; Ret	ESP; 23	ARG; 8	GRE; Ret	NZL; 5	FIN; 15	CYP	FRA; Ret	ITA; 45	AUS; 4	GBR; Ret	11th	5	7th	8
2000	Hyundai Castrol World Rally Team	Hyundai Accent WRC	15	(United Kingdom) Alister McRae	MON	SWE; 14	KEN	POR; Ret	ESP; Ret	ARG; 7	GRE; Ret	NZL; Ret	FIN; 9	CYP	FRA; 12	ITA; 16	AUS; Ret	GBR; 11	–	0	7th	8
2000	Hyundai Castrol World Rally Team	Hyundai Accent WRC	15	(Australia) Michael Guest													AUS; Ret	GBR	–	0	7th	8
2000	Hyundai Winfield Rally Team	Hyundai Accent WRC	15	(Australia) Michael Guest	MON	SWE	KEN	POR	ESP	ARG	GRE	NZL	FIN; 30	CYP	FRA	ITA; Ret			–	0	–	0
2001	Hyundai Castrol World Rally Team	Hyundai Accent WRC2	9	(Italy) Piero Liatti	MON; Ret			ESP; Ret							ITA; Ret	FRA; 8			–	0	5th	17
2001	Hyundai Castrol World Rally Team	Hyundai Accent WRC2	9	(Sweden) Kenneth Eriksson		SWE; 8	POR; 7		ARG; Ret	CYP; Ret	GRE; Ret	KEN	FIN; 12	NZL; 10			AUS; 12	GBR; 6	21st	1	5th	17
2001	Hyundai Castrol World Rally Team	Hyundai Accent WRC2	10	(United Kingdom) Alister McRae	MON; 7	SWE; Ret	POR; 6	ESP; 11	ARG; 9	CYP; 7	GRE; 15	KEN	FIN; 13	NZL; 9	ITA; Ret	FRA; 9	AUS; 10	GBR; 4	17th	4	5th	17
2001	Hyundai Castrol World Rally Team	Hyundai Accent WRC2	20	(Italy) Piero Liatti		SWE	POR		ARG	CYP; Ret	GRE	KEN						GBR; Ret	–	0	5th	17
2001	Hyundai Castrol World Rally Team	Hyundai Accent WRC2	20	(Finland) Juha Kankkunen	MON			ESP					FIN; Ret	NZL	ITA	FRA	AUS		–	0	5th	17
2002	Hyundai Castrol World Rally Team	Hyundai Accent WRC3	17	(Germany) Armin Schwarz	MON; Ret	SWE; Ret	FRA; 13	ESP; 16	CYP; 7	ARG; Ret	GRE; 9	KEN; Ret	FIN; 13	GER; Ret	ITA; Ret	NZL; 10	AUS; Ret	GBR; Ret	–	0	4th	10
2002	Hyundai Castrol World Rally Team	Hyundai Accent WRC3	18	(Belgium) Freddy Loix	MON; Ret	SWE; Ret	FRA; 9	ESP; 10	CYP; Ret	ARG; Ret	GRE; Ret	KEN; Ret	FIN; 9	GER; Ret	ITA; 28	NZL; 6	AUS; Ret	GBR; 8	17th	1	4th	10
2002	Hyundai Castrol World Rally Team	Hyundai Accent WRC3	19	(Finland) Juha Kankkunen	MON	SWE; 8		ESP	CYP; Ret	ARG; 7	GRE; Ret	KEN; 8	FIN; Ret	GER	ITA	NZL; 5	AUS; Ret	GBR; 9	14th	2	4th	10
2002	Hyundai Castrol World Rally Team	Hyundai Accent WRC3	19	(Poland) Tomasz Kuchar			FRA; Ret												–	0	4th	10
2002	Hyundai Castrol World Rally Team	Hyundai Accent WRC3	27	(Poland) Tomasz Kuchar	MON	SWE		ESP	CYP; 14	ARG	GRE	KEN	FIN	GER	ITA	NZL	AUS	GBR	–	0	4th	10
2003	Hyundai World Rally Team	Hyundai Accent WRC3	10	(Germany) Armin Schwarz	MON; 8	SWE; 13	TUR; Ret	NZL; Ret	ARG; Ret	GRE; Ret	CYP; 7	GER; 12	FIN; 12	AUS; 13	ITA	FRA	ESP	GBR	15th	3	6th	12
2003	Hyundai World Rally Team	Hyundai Accent WRC3	11	(Belgium) Freddy Loix	MON; Ret	SWE; 10	TUR; 10	NZL; Ret	ARG; Ret	GRE; Ret	CYP; Ret	GER; 11	FIN; 10	AUS; 8	ITA	FRA	ESP	GBR	14th	4	6th	12
2003	Hyundai World Rally Team	Hyundai Accent WRC3	11	(Finland) Jussi Välimäki	MON	SWE; Ret	TUR	NZL; Ret	ARG	GRE; Ret			FIN; Ret	AUS	ITA	FRA	ESP	GBR	–	0	6th	12
2003	Hyundai World Rally Team	Hyundai Accent WRC3	11	(United Kingdom) Justin Dale							CYP; Ret								–	0	6th	12
2003	Hyundai World Rally Team	Hyundai Accent WRC3	11	(Austria) Manfred Stohl								GER; 18							19th	2	6th	12
2003	Hyundai World Rally Team	Hyundai Accent WRC3	25	(United Kingdom) Justin Dale	MON	SWE	TUR	NZL	ARG	GRE		GER; 28	FIN	AUS	ITA	FRA	ESP	GBR	–	0	6th	12
2004 – 2013: Hyundai did not compete as manufacturer entry
2014	Hyundai Shell World Rally Team	Hyundai i20 WRC	7	(Belgium) Thierry Neuville	MON; Ret	SWE; 28	MEX; 3	POR; 7	ARG; 5	ITA; 16	POL; 3	FIN; Ret	GER; 1	AUS; 7	FRA; 8	ESP; 6	GBR; 4		6th	105	4th	187
2014	Hyundai Shell World Rally Team	Hyundai i20 WRC	8	(Spain) Dani Sordo	MON; Ret				ARG; Ret				GER; 2		FRA; 4	ESP; 5			10th	40	4th	187
2014	Hyundai Shell World Rally Team	Hyundai i20 WRC	8	(Finland) Juho Hänninen		SWE; 19		POR; 8		ITA; Ret	POL; 6	FIN; 6					GBR; 26		13th	20	4th	187
2014	Hyundai Shell World Rally Team	Hyundai i20 WRC	8	(Australia) Chris Atkinson			MEX; 7							AUS; 10					18th	7	4th	187
2014	Hyundai Motorsport N	Hyundai i20 WRC	20	(Spain) Dani Sordo				POR; Ret											–	0	7th	28
2014	Hyundai Motorsport N	Hyundai i20 WRC	20	(New Zealand) Hayden Paddon						ITA; 12	POL; 8	FIN; 8		AUS; 6		ESP; 9	GBR; 10		14th	19	7th	28
2014	Hyundai Motorsport N	Hyundai i20 WRC	20	(France) Bryan Bouffier									GER; Ret		FRA; 9				12th	20	7th	28
2015	Hyundai Motorsport	Hyundai i20 WRC	7	(Belgium) Thierry Neuville	MON; 5	SWE; 2	MEX; 8	ARG; Ret	POR; 39	ITA; 3	POL; 6	FIN; 4	GER; 5	AUS; 7	FRA; 23	ESP; 8			6th	90	3rd	224
2015	Hyundai Motorsport	Hyundai i20 WRC	7	(Spain) Dani Sordo													GBR; 4		8th	89	3rd	224
2015	Hyundai Motorsport	Hyundai i20 WRC	8	(Spain) Dani Sordo	MON; 6		MEX; 5	ARG; 5	POR; 6	ITA; 20	POL; 10	FIN; 11	GER; 4		FRA; 7	ESP; 3			8th	89	3rd	224
2015	Hyundai Motorsport	Hyundai i20 WRC	8	(New Zealand) Hayden Paddon		SWE; 5								AUS; 5			GBR; 5		9th	84	3rd	224
2015	Hyundai Motorsport N	Hyundai i20 WRC	20	(New Zealand) Hayden Paddon	MON		MEX; 17	ARG; 16	POR; 8	ITA; 2	POL; 4	FIN; Ret	GER; 9		FRA; 5	ESP; 6			9th	84	6th	67
2015	Hyundai Motorsport N	Hyundai i20 WRC	20	(Spain) Dani Sordo										AUS; 8					8th	89	6th	67
2015	Hyundai Motorsport N	Hyundai i20 WRC	20	(Belgium) Thierry Neuville													GBR; Ret		6th	90	6th	67
2015	Hyundai Motorsport N	Hyundai i20 WRC	20	(Netherlands) Kevin Abbring		SWE; 11													–	0	6th	67
2015	Hyundai Motorsport N	Hyundai i20 WRC	10	(Netherlands) Kevin Abbring	MON		MEX	ARG	POR	ITA	POL; 15	FIN	GER; 11	AUS	FRA; Ret	ESP	GBR; Ret		–	0	6th	67
2016	Hyundai Motorsport	Hyundai New Generation i20 WRC	3	(Belgium) Thierry Neuville	MON; 3	SWE; 14	MEX; Ret	ARG; 6			POL; 4	FIN; 4	GER; 3	CHN; C	FRA; 2	ESP; 3	GBR; 3	AUS; 3	2nd	160	2nd	312
2016	Hyundai Motorsport	Hyundai New Generation i20 WRC	3	(New Zealand) Hayden Paddon					POR; Ret	ITA; Ret									4th	138	2nd	312
2016	Hyundai Motorsport	Hyundai New Generation i20 WRC	4	(Spain) Dani Sordo	MON; 6		MEX; 4	ARG; 4	POR; 4	ITA; 4			GER; 2	CHN; C	FRA; 7	ESP; 2	GBR; 6		5th	130	2nd	312
2016	Hyundai Motorsport	Hyundai New Generation i20 WRC	4	(New Zealand) Hayden Paddon		SWE; 2					POL; 3	FIN; 5						AUS; 4	4th	138	2nd	312
2016	Hyundai Motorsport N	Hyundai New Generation i20 WRC	10	(New Zealand) Hayden Paddon	MON; 25														4th	138	5th	146
2016	Hyundai Motorsport N	Hyundai New Generation i20 WRC	10	(Netherlands) Kevin Abbring		SWE	MEX	ARG	POR; Ret	ITA; 15	POL		GER	CHN	FRA	ESP; 7	GBR	AUS	16th	10	5th	146
2016	Hyundai Motorsport N	Hyundai New Generation i20 WRC	20	(Spain) Dani Sordo		SWE; 6					POL; Ret							AUS; 5	5th	130	5th	146
2016	Hyundai Motorsport N	Hyundai New Generation i20 WRC	20	(New Zealand) Hayden Paddon			MEX; 5	ARG; 1					GER; 5	CHN; C	FRA; 6	ESP; 4	GBR; 4		4th	138	5th	146
2016	Hyundai Motorsport N	Hyundai New Generation i20 WRC	20	(Belgium) Thierry Neuville					POR; 29	ITA; 1									2nd	160	5th	146
2016	Hyundai Motorsport N	Hyundai New Generation i20 WRC	20	(Netherlands) Kevin Abbring	MON							FIN; 9							16th	10	5th	146
2017	Hyundai Motorsport	Hyundai i20 Coupe WRC	4	(New Zealand) Hayden Paddon	MON; Ret	SWE; 7	MEX; 5	FRA; 6	ARG; 6	POR; Ret	ITA; Ret	POL; 2	FIN; Ret	GER; 8		GBR; 8	AUS; 3		8th	74	2nd	345
2017	Hyundai Motorsport	Hyundai i20 Coupe WRC	4	(Norway) Andreas Mikkelsen											ESP; 16				12th	54	2nd	345
2017	Hyundai Motorsport	Hyundai i20 Coupe WRC	5	(Belgium) Thierry Neuville	MON; 15	SWE; 13	MEX; 3	FRA; 1	ARG; 1	POR; 2	ITA; 3	POL; 1	FIN; 6	GER; 44	ESP; Ret	GBR; 2	AUS; 1		2nd	208	2nd	345
2017	Hyundai Motorsport	Hyundai i20 Coupe WRC	6	(Spain) Dani Sordo	MON; 4	SWE; 4	MEX; 8	FRA; 3	ARG; 8	POR; 3	ITA; 12	POL; 4	FIN; 9	GER; 34	ESP; 15				6th	95	2nd	345
2017	Hyundai Motorsport	Hyundai i20 Coupe WRC	6	(Norway) Andreas Mikkelsen												GBR; 4	AUS; 13		12th	54	2nd	345
2017	Hyundai Motorsport	Hyundai i20 Coupe WRC	16	(Spain) Dani Sordo												GBR; 10	AUS		6th	95	2nd	345
2018	Hyundai Shell Mobis WRT	Hyundai i20 Coupe WRC	4	(Norway) Andreas Mikkelsen	MON; 13	SWE; 3	MEX; 4	FRA; 7	ARG; 5	POR; 16	ITA; 18	FIN; 10	GER; 6	TUR; 5	GBR; 6	ESP; 10	AUS; 11		6th	84	2nd	341
2018	Hyundai Shell Mobis WRT	Hyundai i20 Coupe WRC	5	(Belgium) Thierry Neuville	MON; 5	SWE; 1	MEX; 6	FRA; 3	ARG; 2	POR; 1	ITA; 1	FIN; 9	GER; 2	TUR; 16	GBR; 5	ESP; 4	AUS; Ret		2nd	201	2nd	341
2018	Hyundai Shell Mobis WRT	Hyundai i20 Coupe WRC	6	(Spain) Dani Sordo	MON; Ret		MEX; 2	FRA; 4	ARG; 3				GER; Ret			ESP; 5			9th	71	2nd	341
2018	Hyundai Shell Mobis WRT	Hyundai i20 Coupe WRC	6	(New Zealand) Hayden Paddon		SWE; 5				POR; Ret	ITA; 4	FIN; 4		TUR; 3	GBR; 7		AUS; 2		8th	73	2nd	341
2018	Hyundai Shell Mobis WRT	Hyundai i20 Coupe WRC	16	(Spain) Dani Sordo						POR; 4									9th	71	2nd	341
2019	Hyundai Shell Mobis WRT	Hyundai i20 Coupe WRC	6	(Spain) Dani Sordo	MON	SWE	MEX; 9	FRA; 4	ARG; 6	CHL	POR; 23	ITA; 1	FIN	GER; 5	TUR; 5	GBR	ESP; 3	AUS; C	8th	89	1st	380
2019	Hyundai Shell Mobis WRT	Hyundai i20 Coupe WRC	11	(Belgium) Thierry Neuville	MON; 2	SWE; 3	MEX; 4	FRA; 1	ARG; 1	CHL; Ret	POR; 2	ITA; 6	FIN; 6	GER; 4	TUR; 8	GBR; 2	ESP; 1	AUS; C	2nd	227	1st	380
2019	Hyundai Shell Mobis WRT	Hyundai i20 Coupe WRC	19	(France) Sébastien Loeb	MON; 4	SWE; 7	MEX	FRA; 8	ARG	CHL; 3	POR; Ret	ITA	FIN	GER	TUR	GBR	ESP; 4	AUS; C	11th	51	1st	380
2019	Hyundai Shell Mobis WRT	Hyundai i20 Coupe WRC	42	(Republic of Ireland) Craig Breen	MON	SWE	MEX	FRA	ARG	CHL	POR	ITA	FIN; 7	GER	TUR	GBR; 8	ESP	AUS; C	14th	10	1st	380
2019	Hyundai Shell Mobis WRT	Hyundai i20 Coupe WRC	89	(Norway) Andreas Mikkelsen	MON; Ret	SWE; 4	MEX; Ret	FRA	ARG; 2	CHL; 7	POR	ITA; 3	FIN; 4	GER; 6	TUR; 3	GBR; 6	ESP	AUS; C	4th	102	1st	380
2020	Hyundai Shell Mobis WRT	Hyundai i20 Coupe WRC	6	(Spain) Dani Sordo	MON	SWE	MEX; Ret	EST	TUR	ITA; 1	MNZ; 3								8th	42	1st	241
2020	Hyundai Shell Mobis WRT	Hyundai i20 Coupe WRC	8	(Estonia) Ott Tänak	MON; Ret	SWE; 2	MEX; 2	EST; 1	TUR; 17	ITA; 6	MNZ; 2								3rd	105	1st	241
2020	Hyundai Shell Mobis WRT	Hyundai i20 Coupe WRC	9	(France) Sébastien Loeb	MON; 6	SWE	MEX	EST	TUR; 3	ITA	MNZ								10th	24	1st	241
2020	Hyundai Shell Mobis WRT	Hyundai i20 Coupe WRC	11	(Belgium) Thierry Neuville	MON; 1	SWE; 6	MEX; 16	EST; Ret	TUR; 2	ITA; 2	MNZ; Ret								4th	87	1st	241
2020	Hyundai Shell Mobis WRT	Hyundai i20 Coupe WRC	16	(Republic of Ireland) Craig Breen	MON	SWE; 7	MEX												9th	25	1st	241
2020	Hyundai Shell Mobis WRT	Hyundai i20 Coupe WRC	42	(Republic of Ireland) Craig Breen				EST; 2	TUR	ITA	MNZ								9th	25	1st	241
2021	Hyundai Shell Mobis WRT	Hyundai i20 Coupe WRC	6	(Spain) Dani Sordo	MON; 5	ARC	CRO	POR; 2	ITA; 17	KEN; 12	EST	BEL	GRE; 4	FIN	ESP; 3	MNZ; 3			6th	81	2nd	462
2021	Hyundai Shell Mobis WRT	Hyundai i20 Coupe WRC	8	(Estonia) Ott Tänak	MON; Ret	ARC; 1	CRO; 4	POR; 21	ITA; 24	KEN; 3	EST; 31	BEL; 6	GRE; 2	FIN; 2	ESP; Ret	MNZ			5th	128	2nd	462
2021	Hyundai Shell Mobis WRT	Hyundai i20 Coupe WRC	11	(Belgium) Thierry Neuville	MON; 3	ARC; 3	CRO; 3	POR; 36	ITA; 3	KEN; Ret	EST; 3	BEL; 1	GRE; 8	FIN; Ret	ESP; 1	MNZ; 4			3rd	176	2nd	462
2021	Hyundai Shell Mobis WRT	Hyundai i20 Coupe WRC	42	(Republic of Ireland) Craig Breen	MON	ARC; 4	CRO; 8	POR	ITA	KEN	EST; 2	BEL; 2	GRE	FIN; 3	ESP	MNZ			8th	76	2nd	462
2021	Hyundai Shell Mobis WRT	Hyundai i20 Coupe WRC	3	(Finland) Teemu Suninen	MON	ARC	CRO	POR	ITA	KEN	EST	BEL	GRE	FIN	ESP	MNZ; 6			11th	29	2nd	462
2022	Hyundai Shell Mobis WRT	Hyundai i20 N Rally1	2	(Sweden) Oliver Solberg	MON; Ret	SWE; 6	CRO; Ret	POR	ITA	KEN; 10	EST; 13	FIN; Ret	BEL; 4	GRE	NZL; 5	ESP	JPN		12th	33	2nd	455
2022	Hyundai Shell Mobis WRT	Hyundai i20 N Rally1	6	(Spain) Dani Sordo	MON	SWE	CRO	POR; 3	ITA; 3	KEN	EST	FIN	BEL	GRE; 3	NZL	ESP; 5	JPN; Ret		8th	59	2nd	455
2022	Hyundai Shell Mobis WRT	Hyundai i20 N Rally1	8	(Estonia) Ott Tänak	MON; Ret	SWE; 20	CRO; 2	POR; 6	ITA; 1	KEN; Ret	EST; 3	FIN; 1	BEL; 1	GRE; 2	NZL; 3	ESP; 4	JPN; 2		2nd	205	2nd	455
2022	Hyundai Shell Mobis WRT	Hyundai i20 N Rally1	11	(Belgium) Thierry Neuville	MON; 6	SWE; 2	CRO; 3	POR; 5	ITA; 41	KEN; 5	EST; 4	FIN; 5	BEL; 20	GRE; 1	NZL; 4	ESP; 2	JPN; 1		3rd	193	2nd	455
2023	Hyundai Shell Mobis WRT	Hyundai i20 N Rally1	3	(Finland) Teemu Suninen	MON	SWE	MEX	CRO	POR	ITA	KEN	EST; 5	FIN; 4	GRE	CHL; Ret	EUR; 6	JPN		9th	42	2nd	432
2023	Hyundai Shell Mobis WRT	Hyundai i20 N Rally1	4	(Finland) Esapekka Lappi	MON; 8	SWE; 7	MEX; Ret	CRO; 3	POR; 3	ITA; 2	KEN; 12	EST; 3	FIN; Ret	GRE; 5	CHL; Ret	EUR; Ret	JPN; 4		6th	113	2nd	432
2023	Hyundai Shell Mobis WRT	Hyundai i20 N Rally1	6	(Spain) Dani Sordo	MON; 7	SWE	MEX; 5	CRO	POR; 2	ITA; Ret	KEN; 5	EST	FIN	GRE; 3	CHL	EUR	JPN; Ret		8th	63	2nd	432
2023	Hyundai Shell Mobis WRT	Hyundai i20 N Rally1	11	(Belgium) Thierry Neuville	MON; 3	SWE; 3	MEX; 2	CRO; 33	POR; 5	ITA; 1	KEN; DSQ	EST; 2	FIN; 2	GRE; 20	CHL; 2	EUR; 1	JPN; 13		3rd	189	2nd	432
2023	Hyundai Shell Mobis WRT	Hyundai i20 N Rally1	42	(Republic of Ireland) Craig Breen	MON	SWE; 2	MEX	CRO; WD	POR	ITA	KEN	EST	FIN	GRE	CHL	EUR	JPN		14th	19	2nd	432
2024	Hyundai Shell Mobis WRT	Hyundai i20 N Rally1	4	(Finland) Esapekka Lappi	MON	SWE; 1	KEN; 12	CRO	POR	ITA	POL	LAT; Ret	FIN; 43	GRE	CHL; Ret	EUR	JPN		12th	33	2nd	561
2024	Hyundai Shell Mobis WRT	Hyundai i20 N Rally1	6	(Spain) Dani Sordo	MON	SWE	KEN	CRO	POR; 5	ITA; 3	POL	LAT	FIN	GRE; 2	CHL	EUR	JPN		9th	44	2nd	561
2024	Hyundai Shell Mobis WRT	Hyundai i20 N Rally1	8	(Estonia) Ott Tänak	MON; 4	SWE; 41	KEN; 8	CRO; 4	POR; 2	ITA; 1	POL; 40	LAT; 3	FIN; Ret	GRE; 3	CHL; 3	EUR; 1	JPN; Ret		3rd	200	2nd	561
2024	Hyundai Shell Mobis WRT	Hyundai i20 N Rally1	9	(Norway) Andreas Mikkelsen	MON; 6	SWE	KEN	CRO; 6	POR	ITA	POL; 6	LAT	FIN	GRE	CHL	EUR; 31	JPN; 31		11th	40	2nd	561
2024	Hyundai Shell Mobis WRT	Hyundai i20 N Rally1	11	(Belgium) Thierry Neuville	MON; 1	SWE; 4	KEN; 5	CRO; 3	POR; 3	ITA; 41	POL; 4	LAT; 8	FIN; 2	GRE; 1	CHL; 4	EUR; 3	JPN; 6		1st	242	2nd	561
2025	Hyundai Shell Mobis WRT	Hyundai i20 N Rally1	1	(Belgium) Thierry Neuville	MON; 6	SWE; 3	KEN; 3	ESP; 7	POR; 4	ITA; 19	GRE; 5	EST; 3	FIN; 6	PAR; 3	CHL; 4	EUR; Ret	JPN; Ret	SAU; 1	5th	194	2nd	511
2025	Hyundai Shell Mobis WRT	Hyundai i20 N Rally1	8	(Estonia) Ott Tänak	MON; 5	SWE; 4	KEN; 2	ESP; 6	POR; 2	ITA; 2	GRE; 1	EST; 2	FIN; 10	PAR; 4	CHL; 34	EUR; 3	JPN; 4	SAU; 11	4th	216	2nd	511
2025	Hyundai Shell Mobis WRT	Hyundai i20 N Rally1	16	(France) Adrien Fourmaux	MON; 3	SWE; 40	KEN; 16	ESP; 5	POR; Ret	ITA; 20	GRE; 3	EST; 5	FIN; Ret	PAR; Ret	CHL; 3	EUR; 5	JPN; Ret	SAU; 2	7th	115	2nd	511
2026	Hyundai Shell Mobis WRT	Hyundai i20 N Rally1	16	(France) Adrien Fourmaux	MON; 4	SWE; 5	KEN; 2	CRO; 30	ESP; 5	POR; 4	JPN; 5	GRE; 7	EST; 3	FIN; 4	PAR; 3	CHL; 3	ITA; 4		5th	183	440	2nd
2026	Hyundai Shell Mobis WRT	Hyundai i20 N Rally1	11	(Belgium) Thierry Neuville	MON; 5	SWE; 7	KEN; 12	CRO; Ret	ESP; 6	POR; 1	JPN; 6	GRE; 2	EST; 4	FIN; 5	PAR; 37	CHL; Ret	ITA; 15		7th	134	440	2nd
2026	Hyundai Shell Mobis WRT	Hyundai i20 N Rally1	20	(Australia) Hayden Paddon	MON; 11	SWE	KEN	CRO; 3	ESP	POR	JPN; 7	GRE	EST	FIN	PAR; 2	CHL	ITA		8th	38	440	2nd
2026	Hyundai Shell Mobis WRT	Hyundai i20 N Rally1	4	(Finland) Esapekka Lappi	MON	SWE; 6	KEN; 4	CRO	ESP	POR	JPN	GRE	EST; 8	FIN; Ret	PAR	CHL; 6	ITA		10th	33	440	2nd
2026	Hyundai Shell Mobis WRT	Hyundai i20 N Rally1	6	(Spain) Dani Sordo	MON	SWE	KEN	CRO	ESP; 7	POR; 8	JPN	GRE; Ret	EST	FIN	PAR	CHL	ITA; Ret		18th	10	440	2nd

* Season still in progress.

== WRC2 results ==
Year	Entrant	Car	Driver	1	2	3	4	5	6	7	8	9	10	11	12	13	14	WRC2	Points	Teams	Points
2016	Hyundai Motorsport N	Hyundai i20 R5	(Netherlands) Kevin Abbring	MON	SWE	MEX	ARG	POR	ITA	POL	FIN	GER	CHN; C	FRA; Ret	ESP	GBR; Ret	AUS	NC	0	NC	0
2018	Hyundai Motorsport	Hyundai i20 R5	(Finland) Jari Huttunen	MON	SWE; 6	MEX; 6	FRA	ARG	POR; 12	ITA	FIN; 2	GER; 12	TUR	GBR; 4	ESP; 11	AUS		8th	44	5th	76
2020	Hyundai Motorsport N	Hyundai i20 R5	(Russia) Nikolay Gryazin	MON; 3	SWE; 6	MEX; 2	EST; 5	TUR	ITA; Ret	MNZ								5th	51	3rd	102
2020	Hyundai Motorsport N	Hyundai i20 R5	(Norway) Ole Christian Veiby	MON; Ret	SWE; 2	MEX; 3	EST; Ret	TUR	ITA; 2	MNZ								4th	51	3rd	102
2021	Hyundai Motorsport N	Hyundai i20 R5 / Hyundai i20 N Rally2	(Finland) Jari Huttunen	MON	ARC; Ret	CRO	POR	ITA; 1	KEN	EST; Ret	BEL; 1	GRE	FIN; 3	ESP; Ret	MNZ			3rd	107	4th	73
2021	Hyundai Motorsport N	Hyundai i20 R5 / Hyundai i20 N Rally2	(Sweden) Oliver Solberg	MON; WD	ARC	CRO	POR; 5	ITA	KEN	EST; Ret	BEL; Ret	GRE; Ret	FIN; Ret	ESP	MNZ			18th	10	4th	73
2021	Hyundai Motorsport N	Hyundai i20 R5 / Hyundai i20 N Rally2	(Norway) Ole Christian Veiby	MON	ARC; 5	CRO	POR; DNS	ITA; WD	KEN	EST	BEL	GRE	FIN	ESP	MNZ			16th	13	4th	73
2021	Hyundai Motorsport N	Hyundai i20 R5 / Hyundai i20 N Rally2	(Italy) Andrea Crugnola	MON	ARC	CRO	POR	ITA; WD	KEN	EST	BEL	GRE	FIN	ESP	MNZ			NC	0	4th	73
2021	Hyundai Motorsport N	Hyundai i20 R5 / Hyundai i20 N Rally2	(Finland) Teemu Suninen	MON	ARC	CRO	POR	ITA	KEN	EST	BEL	GRE	FIN	ESP; 2	MNZ			5th	93	4th	73
