= Crazy Leo =

Russian-Canadian rally driver

"Crazy Leo" Urlichich
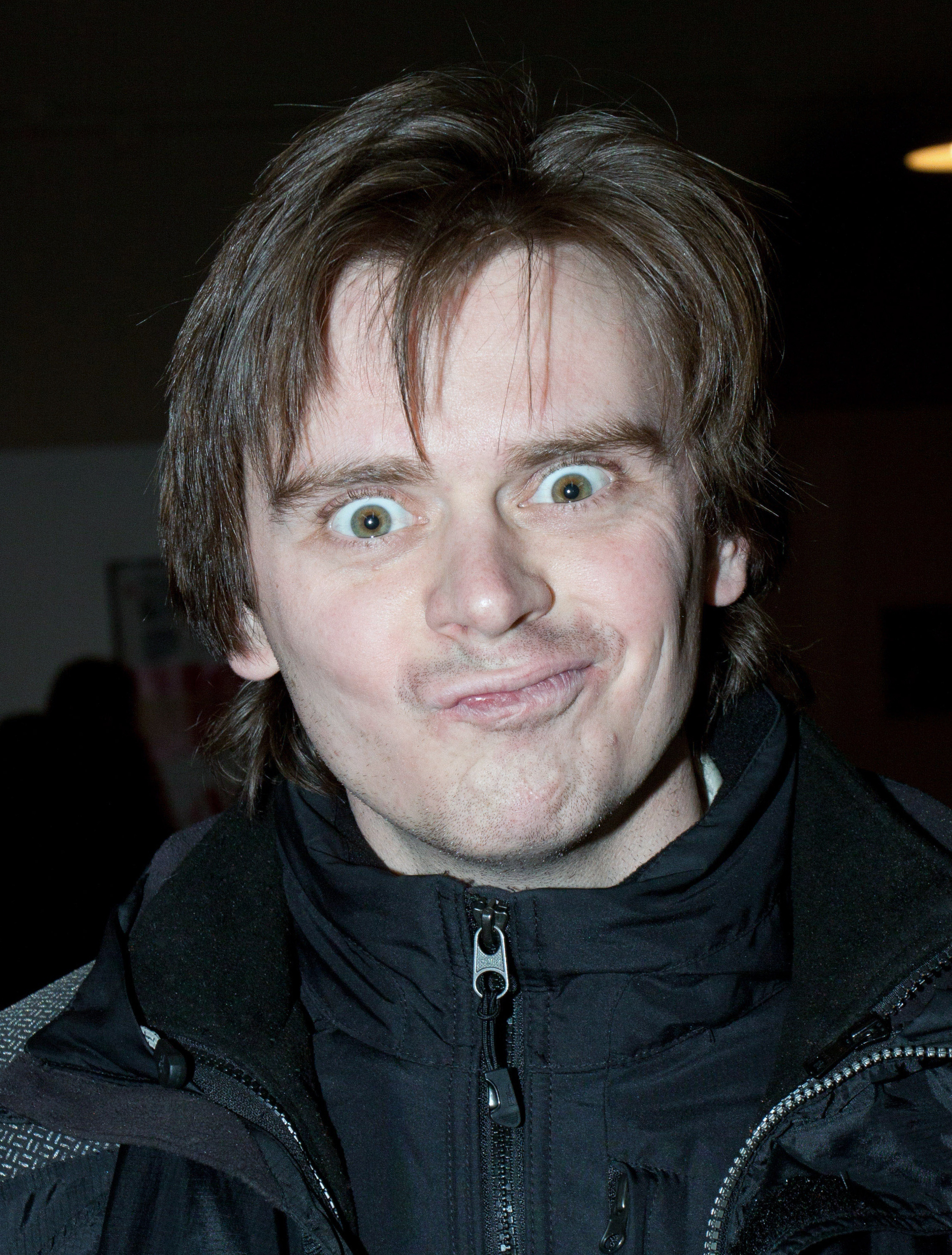
- Urlichich at the 2012 Rallye Perce-Neige

Personal information
- Nationality: Canadian
- Full name: Leonid Urlichich
- Born: 2 February 1985 (age 41)

World Rally Championship record
- Years active: 2014, 2021
- Rallies: 6
- Championships: 0
- Rally wins: 0
- Podiums: 0
- Stage wins: 0
- Total points: 0
- First rally: 2014 Rally de Portugal
- Last rally: 2021 Acropolis Rally

Leonid "Crazy Leo" Urlichich (born 2 February 1985) is a Canadian rally driver currently competing in the Canadian and the US national championships. He drives for a Toronto-based team, Can-Jam Motorsports, and has expressed ambitions to compete in the World Rally Championship.

Urlichich is notable for winning the second gravel rally he has ever finished.

== Career ==
=== Early career ===
At the age of 17, Urlichich enrolled in Trent University in Peterborough, Ontario, where he pursued a Business Administration degree. He first drove competitively while at university, at the local rallycross events in his daily-driven Subaru WRX STi.

2007 marked Urlichich's first performance rally, Rallye Perce-Neige Maniwaki, held in Quebec.

=== 2008-2010 ===
The 2008 Black Bear rally earned Urlichich his first performance rally victory. Urlichich and co-driver Dave Shindle won the event after setting the fastest times on all but the last stage against more experienced Peter Thomson and Andrew Comrie-Picard.

The 2010 season was Urlichich's full season in the Canadian Rally Championship. At the Rally Baie-des-Chaleurs, he earned his first national podium, as he finished second. Urlichich finished fifth overall in the 2010 Canadian Rally Championship.

=== 2011 ===
2011 season saw Urlichich team up with an Irish co-driver, Martin Brady. The team has competed in eight events across Canada. Urlichich lost Rallye de Charlevoix to Antoine L'Estage and John Buffum (who was co-driving at this event) by one second. At the end of the season, Urlichich and Brady won Rally of the Tall Pines and finished second in the Championship. David Higgins, who finished second in the event, noted that the rally was one of the most difficult in his career due to the nature of the stages.

=== 2012 ===
2012 was Urlichich's inaugural season in the Rally American championship in the United States. Partnered with co-driver Carl Williamson, Urlichich won a stage at the debut Sno*Drift rally and finished the event third, later to be penalized to sixth place due to the substrate of the catalytic converter missing. At the second rally of the year, Urlichich crashed into a telegraph pole. Despite the damage to his car, he finished in second place. The video of the accident was uploaded on YouTube and garnered over 1.4 million views.

Urlichich and Williamson finished second in the Canadian Championship, second in the North American Rally Cup, and fifth in the Rally America National Championship.

=== 2013 ===
Urlichich was absent from full-time competition in 2013, spending time in Europe working on a program to compete in one of the Support Categories of the World Rally Championship in 2014.

=== 2014 ===
Debut season in the WRC, in 'Drive DMACK Fiesta Trophy'.

=== 2016 ===
Champion, Class Four, MLRC Rallycross Championship.

=== 2017 ===
Canadian Rally Champion (P4WD).

=== 2018 ===
1st P4WD, Rallye Perce-Neige.

=== 2019 ===
Canadian Rally Champion (P4WD).

1st P4WD, Rallye Perce-Neige.

1st Overall, Rally of the Tall Pines.

2021

Top Rookie in the Rally2 and WRC2 categories — WRC EKO Acropolis Rally of Gods

2023

1st Overall among 2WD competitors — Rally of the Tall Pines, Canadian Rally Championship

2025

Official Course Car — Canadian Rally Championship

2026

Overall Winner — Rallye Perce-Neige

== Co-drivers and pacenotes ==
Urlichich has competed with nine different co-drivers, including co-driver Carl Williamson, who has also co-driven for Jari-Matti Latvala in the Stobart Ford World Rally Team.

Urlichich has claimed on multiple occasions that he recognizes the importance of pacenotes in modern rallying. According to Williamson, Urlichich has developed a "rather unique pacenote system", which was designed from scratch and uses some Finnish words.

== Personality and social media ==
Urlichich is known online for his passion for rallying and his interviews. He has gained a sizeable social media following in North America.

== Other disciplines ==
On July 22 and 23, 2011, Urlichich competed in the Castrol Canadian Touring Car Championship race at the Canadian Tire Motorsport Park, where he struggled and had to implement dirt-driving during his off-track excursions.

== Career results ==
=== WRC results ===
Year	Entrant	Car	1	2	3	4	5	6	7	8	9	10	11	12	13	WDC	Pts
2014	Leonid Urlichich	Ford Fiesta R2	MON	SWE	MEX	POR; 55	ARG	ITA	POL; Ret	FIN; Ret	GER; Ret	AUS	FRA	ESP; 50	GBR	NC	0
2021	Saintéloc Junior Team	Citroën C3 R5	MON	ARC	CRO	POR	ITA	KEN	EST	BEL	GRE; 20	FIN	ESP	MNZ		NC	0

=== Drive DMACK Cup results ===
Year	Entrant	Car	1	2	3	4	5	Pos.	Points
2014	Leonid Urlichich	Ford Fiesta R2	POR; 8	POL; Ret	FIN; Ret	GER; Ret	ESP; 9	10th	6
