= Lambros Athanassoulas =

Greek rally driver (born 1976)

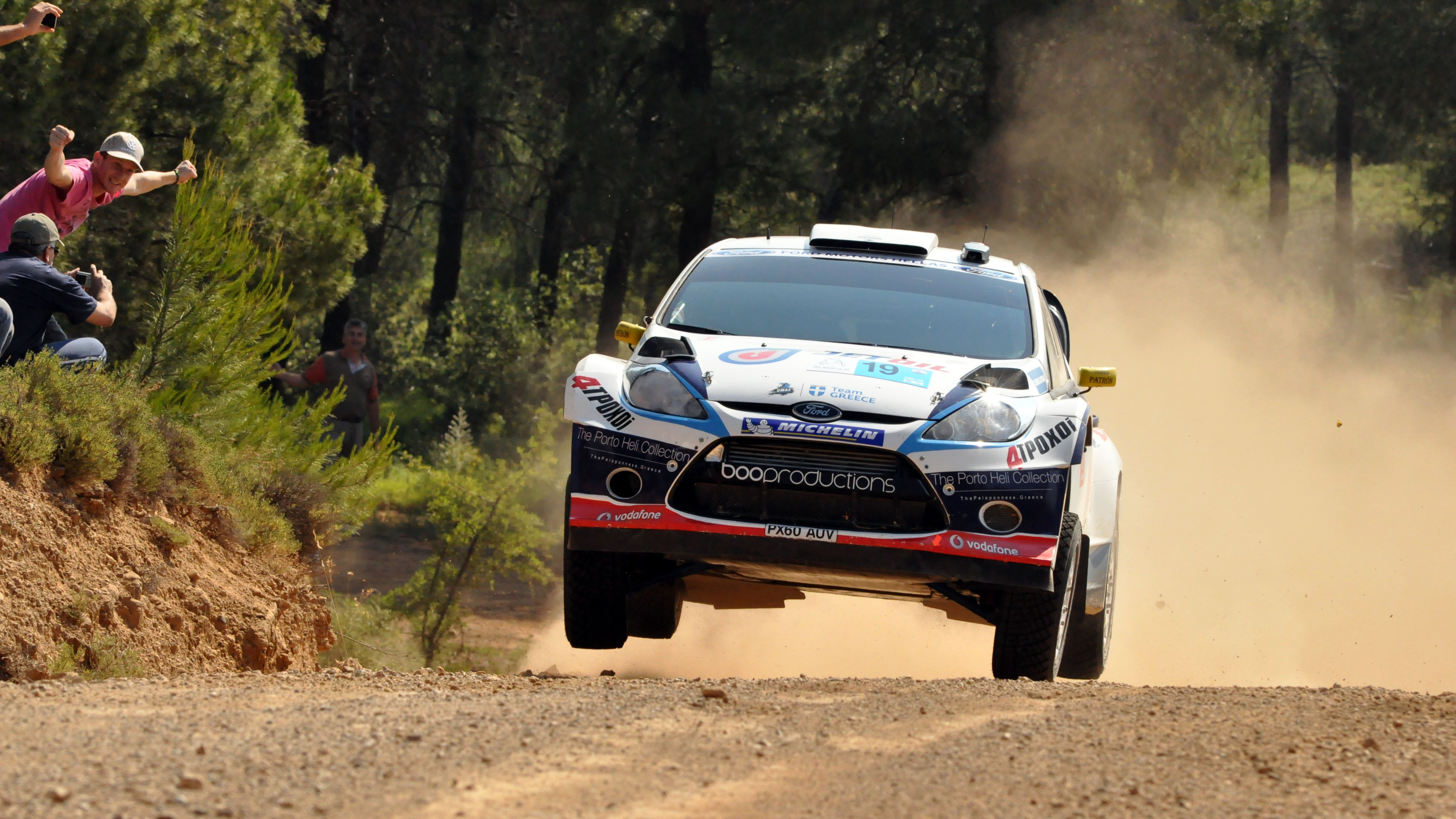
- Athanassoulas at the 2011 Acropolis Rally

Personal information
- Nationality: Greek
- Born: November 10, 1976 (age 50)

World Rally Championship record
- Years active: 2005–2009, 2011, 2013, 2016, 2021–2023
- Rallies: 17
- Championships: 0
- Rally wins: 0
- Podiums: 0
- Stage wins: 0
- Total points: 1
- First rally: 2005 Acropolis Rally
- Last rally: 2023 Acropolis Rally

Lambros Athanassoulas (born November 10, 1976, in Athens) is a Greek rally driver.

== Career ==
Athanassoulas graduated from the American College of Greece and got a BEng in Mechanical Engineering and an M.A. in finance from the University of Westminster. He started racing in 2001, after winning a competition by Greek magazine 4 Wheels and Toyota Hellas. This earned him the chance to drive a Toyota Yaris rally car. In 2005, he won the A5 class of the Greek Rally Championship driving a Ford Puma Kit Car. This led to him becoming an official driver for Ford Motor Hellas. This included making his World Rally Championship debut in a Ford Fiesta S1600 at the 2005 Acropolis Rally. In 2006, Athanassoulas competed in the Fiesta Sporting Trophy, as part of the WRC. In 2007 and 2008, he competed at his home event of the WRC in a Group N Subaru Impreza. For the 2009 Acropolis Rally, Athanassoulas competed in a Škoda Fabia S2000, winning the PWRC class and finishing eighth overall. He followed this by winning his class on the 2009 Rally Catalunya on the debut of the new Ford Fiesta R2. He was named Greek Athlete of the Year at the end of 2009 by Status magazine.

Athanssoulas' first start in the highest class was the 2011 Acropolis Rally, when he presented strong pace, but due to retirement on the first leg and returning later under Rally2 rules classified only 19th. He returned to rallying in 2015 with the Skoda Fabia R5 and scored third place in that year's Acropolis Rally, losing only to title contestants Kajetan Kajetanowicz and Craig Breen, he also led the rally at one point. In 2016, he took on the Rallye Monte-Carlo and finished 22nd overall, eighth in the WRC-2 class. Later that year, he contested both of the local ERC events - the 2016 Acropolis Rally, which he finished in second place (only behind the season's runner-up Ralfs Sirmacis) and the 2016 Cyprus Rally. After a long break, Athanassoulas returned once again in 2021. During the revived Acropolis Rally, Athanassoulas drove the Hyundai i20 N Rally2 and therefore became the first customer entry to use the car in World Rally Championship. However, the new car didn't bring him much luck, as he retired on SS3, but returned later. He scored sixth on the power stage, but after Yohan Rossel's disqualification advanced up to power stage place, which allowed him to score one point and classify in WRC-3 standings.

== WRC results ==
Year	Entrant	Car	1	2	3	4	5	6	7	8	9	10	11	12	13	14	15	16	WDC	Points
2005	Lambros Athanassoulas	Ford Fiesta S1600	MON	SWE	MEX	NZL	ITA	CYP	TUR	GRE; Ret	ARG	FIN	GER	GBR	JPN	FRA	ESP	AUS	NC	0
2006	Lambros Athanassoulas	Ford Fiesta ST	MON	SWE	MEX	ESP; 52	FRA; 45	ARG	ITA; 52	GRE	GER; 31	FIN; Ret	JPN	CYP	TUR	AUS	NZL	GBR; 77	NC	0
2007	Lambros Athanassoulas	Subaru Impreza STi N12	MON	SWE	NOR	MEX	POR	ARG	ITA	GRE; 33	FIN	GER	NZL	ESP	FRA	JPN	IRE	GBR	NC	0
2008	Lambros Athanassoulas	Subaru Impreza WRX STi	MON	SWE	MEX	ARG	JOR	ITA	GRE; 26	TUR	FIN	GER	NZL	ESP	FRA	JPN	GBR		NC	0
2010	Team Greece	Škoda Fabia S2000	IRE	NOR	CYP	POR	ARG	ITA	GRE; 8										20th	1
2010	Team Greece	Ford Fiesta R2								POL	FIN	AUS	ESP; 25	GBR					20th	1
2011	Team Greece	Ford Fiesta RS WRC	SWE	MEX	POR	JOR	ITA	ARG	GRE; 19	FIN	GER	AUS	FRA	ESP	GBR				NC	0
2013	Team Greece	Mitsubishi Lancer Evo X	MON	SWE	MEX	POR	ARG	GRE; Ret	ITA	FIN	GER	AUS	FRA	ESP	GBR				NC	0
2016	Laskaris Foundation Team Greece	Škoda Fabia R5	MON; 22	SWE	MEX	ARG	POR	ITA	POL	FIN	GER	CHN; C	FRA	ESP	GBR	AUS			NC	0
2021	Lambros Athanassoulas	Hyundai i20 N Rally2	MON	ARC	CRO	POR	ITA	KEN	EST	BEL	GRE; 36	FIN	ESP	MNZ					NC	0
2022	Lambros Athanassoulas	Hyundai i20 N Rally2	MON	SWE	CRO	POR	ITA	KEN	EST	FIN	BEL	GRE; 16	NZL	ESP	JPN				NC	0
2023	Lambros Athanassoulas	Hyundai i20 N Rally2	MON	SWE	MEX	CRO	POR	ITA	KEN	EST	FIN	GRE; Ret	CHL	EUR	JPN				NC	0

=== PWRC results ===
Year	Entrant	Car	1	2	3	4	5	6	7	8	Pos.	Points
2008	Lambros Athanassoulas	Subaru Impreza WRX STi	SWE	ARG	GRE; 12	TUR	FIN	NZL	JPN	GBR	NC	0
2009	Team Greece	Škoda Fabia S2000	NOR	CYP	POR	ARG	ITA	GRE; 1	AUS	GBR	9th	10
