= 2014 Drive DMACK Cup =

The 2014 Drive DMACK Cup season was the first season of the Drive DMACK Cup, an auto racing championship recognized by the Fédération Internationale de l'Automobile, running in support of the World Rally Championship. It used Ford Fiesta R2s, and was a cost-effective series within the Championship which offered a prize drive of a full WRC-2 season in a Ford Fiesta R5 car in 2015.

The inaugural championship was won by Estonia's Sander Pärn, winning three of the five events to be held. Pärn finished 19 points clear of his nearest rival, Tom Cave, who won Rallye Deutschland, and like Pärn took four top-two finishes during the season. Quentin Gilbert finished third in the championship, after Yeray Lemes was given a 25-point penalty for missing the final round of the season. Gilbert won the most stages during the season with 27, which allowed him to advance up the championship as each stage win counted for a point in the drivers' championship. The only other driver to win a rally was Nil Solans, who won his home event at the Rally de Catalunya. Pärn's co-driver James Morgan won the co-drivers' championship by a similar margin to his driver, over Cave's co-driver Craig Parry.

== Calendar ==
The final 2014 Drive DMACK Cup calendar consisted of five European events, running as part of the 2014 World Rally Championship season.

Round	Dates	Rally name	Rally headquarters	Surface
1	3–6 April	48º Vodafone Rally de Portugal	Faro, Algarve	Gravel
2	27–29 June	71st LOTOS Rally Poland	Mikołajki, Warmia-Masuria	Gravel
3	1–3 August	64th Neste Oil Rally Finland	Jyväskylä, Keski-Suomi	Gravel
4	22–24 August	(Germany) 32. ADAC Rallye Deutschland	Trier, Rhineland-Palatinate	Tarmac
5	24–26 October	(Spain) 50º Rally RACC Catalunya – Costa Daurada	Salou, Tarragona	Mixed

== Drivers ==
The following drivers took part in the championship.

No.	Driver	Co-driver	Rounds
101	(Spain) Yeray Lemes	(Spain) Rogelio Peñate	1–4
102	(Spain) José Antonio Suárez	(Spain) Pablo Marcos Secades	1–2
102	(Spain) José Antonio Suárez	(Spain) Borja Rozada	3
103	(France) Quentin Gilbert	(Belgium) Renaud Jamoul	All
104	(United Kingdom) Tom Cave	(United Kingdom) Craig Parry	All
105	(Estonia) Sander Pärn	(United Kingdom) James Morgan	All
106	(Norway) Marius Aasen	(Norway) Marlene Engan	1–3
107	(Belgium) Ghislain de Mevius	(Belgium) Johan Jalet	All
108	(Spain) Nil Solans	(Spain) Miquel Ibáñez Sotos	All
109	(Finland) Max Vatanen	(Finland) Mikko Lukka	All
110	(Canada) Leonid Urlichich	(United Kingdom) Andrew Roughead	1
110	(Canada) Leonid Urlichich	(Republic of Ireland) Darragh Mullen	2
110	(Canada) Leonid Urlichich	(United Kingdom) Darren Garrod	3
110	(Canada) Leonid Urlichich	(United Kingdom) Michael Gilbey	4–5
111	(Lebanon) Nicolas Amiouni	(Spain) Carlos del Barrio	1
111	(Lebanon) Nicolas Amiouni	(Lebanon) Joseph Matar	2–5
112	(Poland) Szymon Kornicki	(Poland) Przemyslaw Mazur	All

== Rally summaries ==
Round	Rally name	Podium finishers				Statistics			
Round	Rally name	Pos.	Driver	Team	Time	Stages	Length	Starters	Finishers
1	48° Rally de Portugal (3–6 April) — Results	1	(Estonia) Sander Pärn (United Kingdom) James Morgan	(Estonia) Sander Pärn (Ford Fiesta R2)	4:14:19.8	(16); 14	(339.46 km); 290.83 km	12	8
1	48° Rally de Portugal (3–6 April) — Results	2	(United Kingdom) Tom Cave (United Kingdom) Craig Parry	(United Kingdom) Tom Cave (Ford Fiesta R2)	4:14:40.6	(16); 14	(339.46 km); 290.83 km	12	8
1	48° Rally de Portugal (3–6 April) — Results	3	(Belgium) Ghislain de Mevius (Belgium) Johan Jalet	(Belgium) Ghislain de Mevius (Ford Fiesta R2)	4:17:58.9	(16); 14	(339.46 km); 290.83 km	12	8
2	71st Rally Poland (26–29 June) — Results	1	(Estonia) Sander Pärn (United Kingdom) James Morgan	(Estonia) Sander Pärn (Ford Fiesta R2)	3:05:21.5	(24); 21	(336.64 km); 304.98 km	12	8
2	71st Rally Poland (26–29 June) — Results	2	(United Kingdom) Tom Cave (United Kingdom) Craig Parry	(United Kingdom) Tom Cave (Ford Fiesta R2)	3:05:51.5	(24); 21	(336.64 km); 304.98 km	12	8
2	71st Rally Poland (26–29 June) — Results	3	(Spain) Yeray Lemes (Spain) Rogelio Peñate	(Spain) Yeray Lemes (Ford Fiesta R2)	3:08:38.8	(24); 21	(336.64 km); 304.98 km	12	8
3	64th Rally Finland (1–3 August) — Results	1	(Estonia) Sander Pärn (United Kingdom) James Morgan	(Estonia) Sander Pärn (Ford Fiesta R2)	3:30:13.0	26	360.94 km	12	8
3	64th Rally Finland (1–3 August) — Results	2	(France) Quentin Gilbert (Belgium) Renaud Jamoul	(France) Quentin Gilbert (Ford Fiesta R2)	3:32:13.4	26	360.94 km	12	8
3	64th Rally Finland (1–3 August) — Results	3	(Spain) Yeray Lemes (Spain) Rogelio Peñate	(Spain) Yeray Lemes (Ford Fiesta R2)	3:35:35.9	26	360.94 km	12	8
4	(Germany) 32. Rallye Deutschland (22–24 August) — Results	1	(United Kingdom) Tom Cave (United Kingdom) Craig Parry	(United Kingdom) Tom Cave (Ford Fiesta R2)	3:41:31.9	(18); 17	(324.31 km); 313.23 km	10	8
4	(Germany) 32. Rallye Deutschland (22–24 August) — Results	2	(Estonia) Sander Pärn (United Kingdom) James Morgan	(Estonia) Sander Pärn (Ford Fiesta R2)	3:44:49.0	(18); 17	(324.31 km); 313.23 km	10	8
4	(Germany) 32. Rallye Deutschland (22–24 August) — Results	3	(Belgium) Ghislain de Mevius (Belgium) Johan Jalet	(Belgium) Ghislain de Mevius (Ford Fiesta R2)	3:45:19.7	(18); 17	(324.31 km); 313.23 km	10	8
5	(Spain) 50º Rally RACC Catalunya – Costa Daurada (24–26 October) — Results	1	(Spain) Nil Solans (Spain) Miquel Ibáñez	(Spain) Nil Solans (Ford Fiesta R2)	4:26:52.8	17	372.96 km	9	9
5	(Spain) 50º Rally RACC Catalunya – Costa Daurada (24–26 October) — Results	2	(United Kingdom) Tom Cave (United Kingdom) Craig Parry	(United Kingdom) Tom Cave (Ford Fiesta R2)	4:28:55.0	17	372.96 km	9	9
5	(Spain) 50º Rally RACC Catalunya – Costa Daurada (24–26 October) — Results	3	(Poland) Szymon Kornicki (Poland) Przemysław Mazur	(Poland) Szymon Kornicki (Ford Fiesta R2)	4:31:50.4	17	372.96 km	9	9

== Championship standings ==
=== FIA Drive DMACK Cup for Drivers ===
Pos.	Driver	POR (Portugal)	POL (Poland)	FIN (Finland)	DEU (Germany)	ESP (Spain)	Points
1	(Estonia) Sander Pärn	1	1^{9}	1^{6}	2^{1}	5^{1}	120
2	(United Kingdom) Tom Cave	2	2^{4}	7^{7}	1^{2}	2^{3}	101
3	(France) Quentin Gilbert	Ret^{1}	Ret^{1}	2^{8}	8^{6}	7^{11}	55
4	(Finland) Max Vatanen	Ret^{2}	4^{2}	4^{1}	5	4	51
5	(Poland) Szymon Kornicki	6	5	8	4	3	49
6	(Belgium) Ghislain de Mevius	3	Ret	5	3	6	48
7	(Spain) Nil Solans	Ret	7	6	7	1^{1}	46
8	(Spain) Yeray Lemes	5^{4}	3^{3}	3^{1}	Ret^{8}		31
9	(Lebanon) Nicolas Amiouni	Ret	6	Ret	6	8	20
10	(Russia) Leonid Urlichich	8	Ret	Ret	Ret	9	6
11	(Spain) José Antonio Suárez	4^{5}	Ret^{1}	Ret^{1}			−31
12	(Norway) Marius Aasen	7^{2}	8^{1}	Ret^{2}			−35
Pos.	Driver	POR (Portugal)	POL (Poland)	FIN (Finland)	DEU (Germany)	ESP (Spain)	Points

Key
Colour	Result
Gold	Winner
Silver	2nd place
Bronze	3rd place
Green	Points finish
Blue	Non-points finish
Blue	Non-classified finish (NC)
Purple	Did not finish (Ret)
Black	Excluded (EX)
Black	Disqualified (DSQ)
White	Did not start (DNS)
White	Cancelled (C)
Blank	Withdrew entry from the event (WD)

=== FIA Drive DMACK Cup for Co-Drivers ===
Pos.	Co-driver	POR (Portugal)	POL (Poland)	FIN (Finland)	DEU (Germany)	ESP (Spain)	Points
1	(United Kingdom) James Morgan	1	1^{9}	1^{6}	2^{1}	5^{1}	120
2	(United Kingdom) Craig Parry	2	2^{4}	7^{7}	1^{2}	2^{3}	101
3	(Belgium) Renaud Jamoul	Ret^{1}	Ret^{1}	2^{8}	8^{6}	7^{11}	55
4	(Finland) Mikko Lukka	Ret^{2}	4^{2}	4^{1}	5	4	51
5	(Poland) Przemysław Mazur	6	5	8	4	3	49
6	(Belgium) Johan Jalet	3	Ret	5	3	6	48
7	(Spain) Miquel Ibáñez Sotos	Ret	7	6	7	1^{1}	46
8	(Spain) Rogelio Peñate	5^{4}	3^{3}	3^{1}	Ret^{8}		31
9	(Lebanon) Joseph Matar		6	Ret	6	8	20
10	(Spain) Pablo Marcos Secades	4^{5}	Ret^{1}				18
11	(United Kingdom) Andrew Roughead	8					4
12	(United Kingdom) Michael Gilbey				Ret	9	2
	(Spain) Carlos del Barrio	Ret					0
	(Republic of Ireland) Darragh Mullen		Ret				0
	(United Kingdom) Darren Garrod			Ret			0
	(Norway) Marlene Engan	7^{2}	8^{1}	Ret^{2}			−35
	(Spain) Borja Rozada			Ret^{1}			−49
Pos.	Co-driver	POR (Portugal)	POL (Poland)	FIN (Finland)	DEU (Germany)	ESP (Spain)	Points
