= 2021 Acropolis Rally =

65th edition of Acropolis Rally

2021 Acropolis Rally EKO Acropolis Rally of Gods 2021
Round 9 of 12 in the 2021 World Rally Championship
← Previous event	Next event →
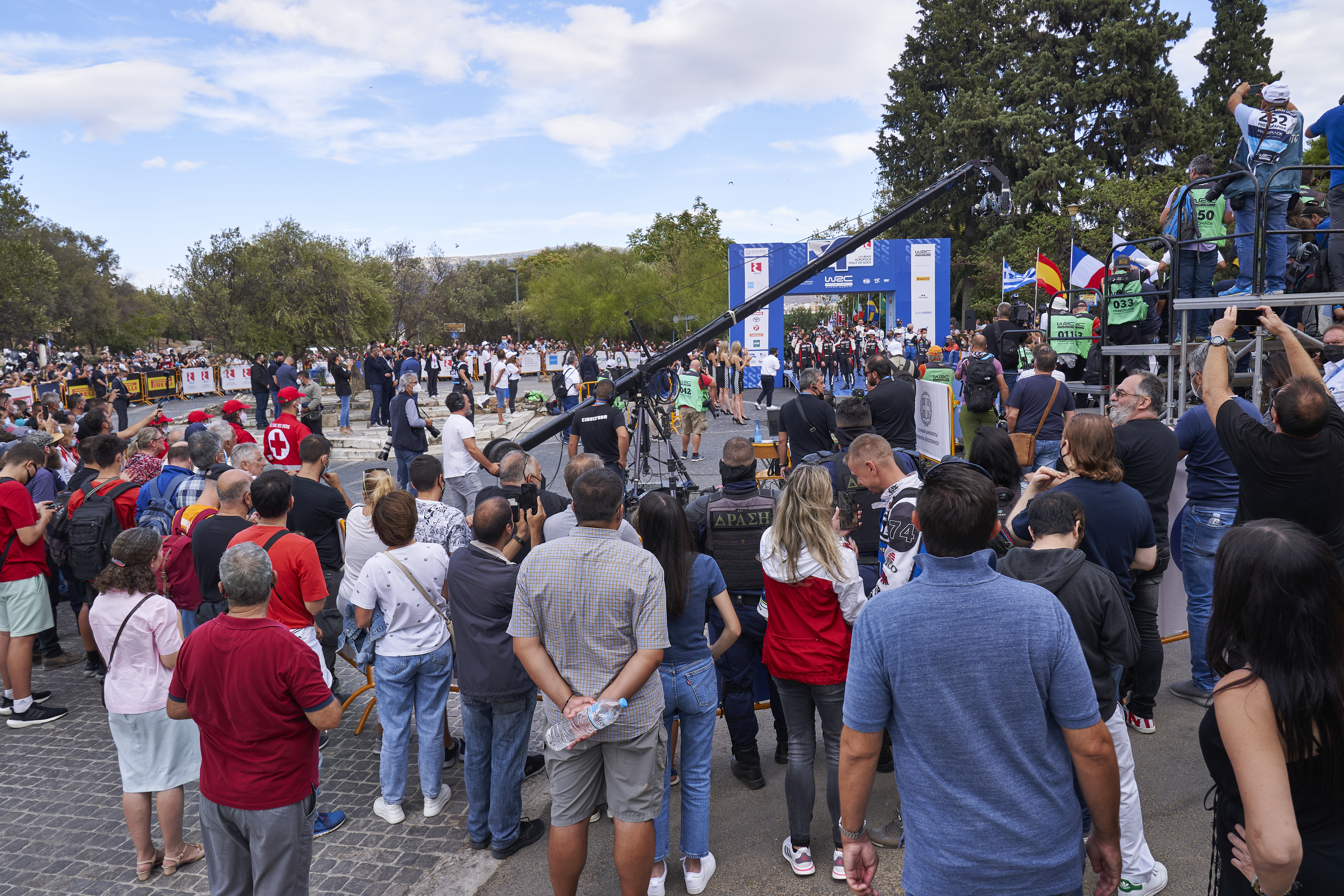
- The Acropolis Rally of Greece returned to the championship after eight years.
- Host country: Greece
- Rally base: Lamia, Central Greece
- Dates run: 9 – 12 September 2021
- Start location: Athens, Attica
- Finish location: Lamia, Central Greece
- Stages: 15 (292.19 km; 181.56 miles)
- Stage surface: Gravel
- Transport distance: 993.66 km (617.43 miles)
- Overall distance: 1,253.15 km (778.67 miles)

Statistics
- Crews registered: 55
- Crews: 48 at start, 43 at finish

Overall results
- Overall winner: (Finland) Kalle Rovanperä (Finland) Jonne Halttunen (Japan) Toyota Gazoo Racing WRT; 3:28:24.6
- Power Stage winner: (Finland) Kalle Rovanperä (Finland) Jonne Halttunen (Japan) Toyota Gazoo Racing WRT; 8:34.8

Support category results
- WRC-2 winner: (Norway) Andreas Mikkelsen (United Kingdom) Elliott Edmondson (Germany) Toksport WRT; 3:37:27.1
- WRC-3 winner: (Poland) Kajetan Kajetanowicz (Poland) Maciej Szczepaniak; 3:39:48.2

The 2021 Acropolis Rally (also known as the EKO Acropolis Rally of Gods 2021) was a motor racing event for rally cars that held over four days between 9 and 12 September 2021. It marked the sixty-fifth running of the Acropolis Rally. The event was the ninth round of the 2021 World Rally Championship, World Rally Championship-2 and World Rally Championship-3. The 2021 event was based in the town of Lamia in Central Greece and contested over fifteen special stages totalling 292.19 km (181.56 mi) in competitive distance.

Jari-Matti Latvala and Miikka Anttila were the reigning rally winners. However, they did not defend their titles as Latvala retired from the competition. Volkswagen Motorsport, the team they drove for in 2013, when Acropolis Rally held a World Rally Championship event last time, were the defending manufacturers' winners, but they did not defend their title neither when Volkswagen retired from the championship at the end of 2016. Robert Kubica and Maciek Baran were the reigning rally winners in the World Rally Championship-2 category, but they did not defend their titles since Kubica was competing the 2021 Italian Grand Prix.

Kalle Rovanperä and Jonne Halttunen were the overall rally winners. Their team, Toyota Gazoo Racing WRT, were the manufacturer's winners. In the World Rally Championship-2 category, Andreas Mikkelsen won the class with his new co-driver Elliott Edmondson. In the World Rally Championship-3 category, Yohan Rossel and Alexandre Coria finished first in the class. However, they were disqualified from the results after the rally as the front subframe on their Citroën C3 Rally2 was found to be overweight during the post-event scrutineering. The polish crew of Kajetan Kajetanowicz and Maciej Szczepaniak subsequently became the WRC-3 winners.

== Background ==
=== Championship standings prior to the event ===
Reigning World Champions Sébastien Ogier and Julien Ingrassia entered the round with a thirty-eight-point lead, with the crew of Elfyn Evans and Scott Martin and of Thierry Neuville and Martijn Wydaeghe shared second. In the World Rally Championship for Manufacturers, Toyota Gazoo Racing WRT held a forty-one--point lead over defending manufacturers' champions Hyundai Shell Mobis WRT, followed by M-Sport Ford WRT.

In the World Rally Championship-2 standings, Andreas Mikkelsen and Ola Fløene held an eleven-point lead ahead of Mads Østberg and Torstein Eriksen in the drivers' and co-drivers' standings respectively, with Marco Bulacia Wilkinson and Marcelo Der Ohannesian in third. In the teams' championship, Toksport WRT led Movisport by thirty-seven points, with M-Sport Ford WRT in third.

In the World Rally Championship-3 standings, Yohan Rossel and Alexandre Coria were the championships leaders, followed by Kajetan Kajetanowicz and Maciek Szczepaniak, with Nicolas Ciamin and Yannick Roche in third.

=== Entry list ===
The following crews entered the rally. The event was open to crews competing in the World Rally Championship, its support categories, the World Rally Championship-2 and World Rally Championship-3, and privateer entries that were not registered to score points in any championship. Eleven entries for the World Rally Championship were received, as were ten in the World Rally Championship-2 and nineteen in the World Rally Championship-3.

Rally1 entries competing in the World Rally Championship
No.	Driver	Co-Driver	Entrant	Car	Tyre
1	(France) Sébastien Ogier	(France) Julien Ingrassia	(Japan) Toyota Gazoo Racing WRT	Toyota Yaris WRC	P
6	(Spain) Dani Sordo	(Spain) Cándido Carrera	(South Korea) Hyundai Shell Mobis WRT	Hyundai i20 Coupe WRC	P
7	(France) Pierre-Louis Loubet	(France) Florian Haut-Labourdette	(France) Hyundai 2C Competition	Hyundai i20 Coupe WRC	P
8	(Estonia) Ott Tänak	(Estonia) Martin Järveoja	(South Korea) Hyundai Shell Mobis WRT	Hyundai i20 Coupe WRC	P
9	(Greece) Jourdan Serderidis	(Belgium) Frédéric Miclotte	(United Kingdom) M-Sport Ford WRT	Ford Fiesta WRC	P
11	(Belgium) Thierry Neuville	(Belgium) Martijn Wydaeghe	(South Korea) Hyundai Shell Mobis WRT	Hyundai i20 Coupe WRC	P
16	(France) Adrien Fourmaux	(Belgium) Renaud Jamoul	(United Kingdom) M-Sport Ford WRT	Ford Fiesta WRC	P
18	(Japan) Takamoto Katsuta	(United Kingdom) Keaton Williams	(Japan) Toyota Gazoo Racing WRT	Toyota Yaris WRC	—N/a
33	(United Kingdom) Elfyn Evans	(United Kingdom) Scott Martin	(Japan) Toyota Gazoo Racing WRT	Toyota Yaris WRC	P
44	(United Kingdom) Gus Greensmith	(Republic of Ireland) Chris Patterson	(United Kingdom) M-Sport Ford WRT	Ford Fiesta WRC	P
69	(Finland) Kalle Rovanperä	(Finland) Jonne Halttunen	(Japan) Toyota Gazoo Racing WRT	Toyota Yaris WRC	P

Rally2 entries competing in the World Rally Championship-2
No.	Driver	Co-Driver	Entrant	Car	Tyre
20	(Norway) Andreas Mikkelsen	(United Kingdom) Elliott Edmondson	(Germany) Toksport WRT	Škoda Fabia Rally2 evo	P
21	(Norway) Mads Østberg	(Norway) Torstein Eriksen	(Hungary) TRT World Rally Team	Citroën C3 Rally2	P
22	(Bolivia) Marco Bulacia Wilkinson	(Argentina) Marcelo Der Ohannesian	(Germany) Toksport WRT	Škoda Fabia Rally2 evo	P
23	Nikolay Gryazin (Note: Nikolay Gryazin is Russian, but he competes as a neutral competitor using the designation RAF (Russian Automobile Federation), as the Court of Arbitration for Sport upheld a ban on Russia competing at World Championships. The ban was implemented by the World Anti-Doping Agency in response to state-sponsored doping program of Russian athletes.)	Konstantin Aleksandrov (Note: Konstantin Aleksandrov is Russian, but he competes as a neutral competitor using the designation RAF (Russian Automobile Federation), as the Court of Arbitration for Sport upheld a ban on Russia competing at World Championships. The ban was implemented by the World Anti-Doping Agency in response to state-sponsored doping program of Russian athletes.)	(Italy) Movisport	Ford Fiesta Rally2	P
24	(Finland) Teemu Suninen	(Finland) Mikko Markkula	(United Kingdom) M-Sport Ford WRT	Ford Fiesta Rally2	—N/a
25	(Czech Republic) Martin Prokop	(Czech Republic) Michal Ernst	(United Kingdom) M-Sport Ford WRT	Ford Fiesta Rally2	P
26	(United States) Sean Johnston	(United States) Alex Kihurani	(France) Saintéloc Junior Team	Citroën C3 Rally2	P
27	(Estonia) Georg Linnamäe	(United Kingdom) James Morgan	(Estonia) ALM Motorsport	Škoda Fabia Rally2 evo	P
28	(Sweden) Oliver Solberg	(Republic of Ireland) Aaron Johnston	(South Korea) Hyundai Motorsport N	Hyundai i20 N Rally2	P
29	(Canada) Crazy Leo	(United Kingdom) Tom Woodburn	(France) Saintéloc Junior Team	Citroën C3 Rally2	P

Rally2 entries competing in the World Rally Championship-3 (Note: Under the Sporting Regulations, each car competing in the World Rally Championship-3 is entered under the driver's name.)
No.	Driver	Co-Driver	Entrant	Car	Tyre
30	(France) Yohan Rossel	(France) Alexandre Coria	(France) Yohan Rossel	Citroën C3 Rally2	P
31	(Poland) Kajetan Kajetanowicz	(Poland) Maciej Szczepaniak	(Poland) Kajetan Kajetanowicz	Škoda Fabia Rally2 evo	P
32	(Paraguay) Fabrizio Zaldivar	(Spain) Carlos del Barrio	(Paraguay) Fabrizio Zaldivar	Škoda Fabia Rally2 evo	P
34	(United Kingdom) Chris Ingram	(United Kingdom) Ross Whittock	(United Kingdom) Chris Ingram	Škoda Fabia Rally2 evo	P
35	(Finland) Emil Lindholm	(Finland) Reeta Hämäläinen	(Finland) Emil Lindholm	Škoda Fabia Rally2 evo	P
36	(Poland) Daniel Chwist	(Poland) Kamil Heller	(Poland) Daniel Chwist	Hyundai i20 R5	P
37	(Chile) Emilio Fernández	(Argentina) Ruben Garcia	(Chile) Emilio Fernández	Škoda Fabia Rally2 evo	P
38	(Chile) Alberto Heller	(Spain) Marc Martí	(Chile) Alberto Heller	Citroën C3 Rally2	P
39	(Spain) Miguel Díaz-Aboitiz	(Spain) Diego Sanjuan de Eusebio	(Spain) Miguel Díaz-Aboitiz	Škoda Fabia Rally2 evo	P
40	(Greece) Lambros Athanassoulas	(Greece) Nikolaos Zakheos	(Greece) Lambros Athanassoulas	Hyundai i20 N Rally2	P
41	(Cyprus) Alex Tsouloftas	(Cyprus) Stelios Elia	(Cyprus) Alex Tsouloftas	Volkswagen Polo GTI R5	P
42	(Italy) Fabrizio Arengi Bentivoglio	(Italy) Massimiliano Bosi	(Italy) Fabrizio Arengi Bentivoglio	Škoda Fabia R5	P
43	(Brazil) Paulo Nobre	(Brazil) Gabriel Morales	(Brazil) Paulo Nobre	Škoda Fabia R5	P
45	(Greece) Giorgos Kehagias	(Greece) Marios Tsaousoglou	(Greece) Giorgos Kehagias	Škoda Fabia Rally2 evo	P
46	(Greece) Roustemis Panagiotis	(Greece) Konstantinos Nikolopoulos	(Greece) Roustemis Panagiotis	Citroën DS3 R5	P
47	(Greece) Panagiotis Hatzitsopanis	(Greece) Nikolaos Petropoulos	(Greece) Panagiotis Hatzitsopanis	Ford Fiesta Rally2	P
48	(Greece) Vasileios Velanis	(Greece) Ioannis Velanis	(Greece) Vasileios Velanis	Škoda Fabia Rally2 evo	P
49	(Greece) Ioannis Plagos	(Greece) Alkiviadis Rentis	(Greece) Ioannis Plagos	Citroën C3 Rally2	P
50	(Greece) Spyridon Galerakis	(Greece) Konstantinos Soukoulis	(Greece) Spyridon Galerakis	Škoda Fabia R5	P

Other major entries
No.	Driver	Co-Driver	Entrant	Car	Tyre
51	(Cyprus) Simos Galatariotis	(Cyprus) Antonis Ioannou	(Cyprus) Simos Galatariotis	Volkswagen Polo GTI R5	P
58	(Australia) Molly Taylor	(United Kingdom) Sebastian Marshall	M-Sport Poland	Ford Fiesta Rally3	P
65	(Italy) Carlo Covi	(Italy) Michela Lorigiola	(Italy) Carlo Covi	Peugeot 208 R2	P

=== Route ===
==== Itinerary ====
All dates and times are EET (UTC+3).

Leg	Date	Time	No.	Stage name	Distance
—N/a	9 September	08:01	—	Divri [Shakedown]	4.32 km
1	9 September	18:08	SS1	Cosmote 5G Athens Stage	0.98 km
1	10 September	10:18	SS2	Aghii Theodori 1	17.54 km
1	10 September	11:11	SS3	Loutraki	19.40 km
1	10 September	13:24	SS4	Aghii Theodori 2	17.54 km
1	10 September	15:47	SS5	Thiva	23.27 km
1	10 September	17:40	SS6	Elatia	11.65 km
2	11 September	08:32	SS7	Pavliani 1	24.25 km
2	11 September	09:57	SS8	Gravia	24.81 km
2	11 September	11:52	SS9	Bauxites	22.97 km
2	11 September	13:08	SS10	Eleftherochori 1	18.14 km
2	11 September	16:26	SS11	Pavliani 2	24.25 km
2	11 September	18:08	SS12	Eleftherochori 2	18.14 km
3	12 September	08:25	SS13	Tarzan 1	23.37 km
3	12 September	10:03	SS14	Pyrgos	33.20 km
3	12 September	13:18	SS15	Tarzan 2 [Power Stage]	12.68 km

== Report ==
=== World Rally Cars ===
==== Classification ====
Position		No.	Driver	Co-driver	Entrant	Car	Time	Difference	Points	
Event	Class	No.	Driver	Co-driver	Entrant	Car	Time	Difference	Event	Stage
1	1	69	Kalle Rovanperä	Jonne Halttunen	Toyota Gazoo Racing WRT	Toyota Yaris WRC	3:28:24.6	0.0	25	5
2	2	8	Ott Tänak	Martin Järveoja	Hyundai Shell Mobis WRT	Hyundai i20 Coupe WRC	3:29:06.7	+42.1	18	1
3	3	1	Sébastien Ogier	Julien Ingrassia	Toyota Gazoo Racing WRT	Toyota Yaris WRC	3:29:35.9	+1:11.3	15	3
4	4	6	Dani Sordo	Cándido Carrera	Hyundai Shell Mobis WRT	Hyundai i20 Coupe WRC	3:31:25.6	+3:01.0	12	0
5	5	44	Gus Greensmith	Chris Patterson	M-Sport Ford WRT	Ford Fiesta WRC	3:34:09.6	+5:45.0	10	0
6	6	33	Elfyn Evans	Scott Martin	Toyota Gazoo Racing WRT	Toyota Yaris WRC	3:35:07.3	+6:42.7	8	4
7	7	16	Adrien Fourmaux	Renaud Jamoul	M-Sport Ford WRT	Ford Fiesta WRC	3:35:19.0	+6:54.4	6	0
8	8	11	Thierry Neuville	Martijn Wydaeghe	Hyundai Shell Mobis WRT	Hyundai i20 Coupe WRC	3:37:05.7	+8:41.1	4	2
23	9	9	Jourdan Serderidis	Frédéric Miclotte	M-Sport Ford WRT	Ford Fiesta WRC	3:55:42.1	+27:17.5	0	0
Retired SS13		7	Pierre-Louis Loubet	Florian Haut-Labourdette	Hyundai 2C Competition	Hyundai i20 Coupe WRC	Mechanical		0	0
Did not start		18	Takamoto Katsuta	Keaton Williams	Toyota Gazoo Racing WRT	Toyota Yaris WRC	Withdrawn		0	0

==== Special stages ====
Day	Stage	Stage name	Length	Winners	Car	Time	Class leaders
9 September	—	Divri [Shakedown]	4.32 km	Rovanperä / Halttunen	Toyota Yaris WRC	3:14.3	—N/a
9 September	SS1	Cosmote 5G Athens Stage	0.98 km	Ogier / Ingrassia	Toyota Yaris WRC	51.5	Ogier / Ingrassia
10 September	SS2	Aghii Theodori 1	17.54 km	Tänak / Järveoja	Hyundai i20 Coupe WRC	13:15.8	Ogier / Ingrassia
10 September	SS3	Loutraki	19.40 km	Rovanperä / Halttunen	Toyota Yaris WRC	13:04.4	Rovanperä / Halttunen
10 September	SS4	Aghii Theodori 2	17.54 km	Rovanperä / Halttunen	Toyota Yaris WRC	13:10.3	Rovanperä / Halttunen
10 September	SS5	Thiva	23.27 km	Ogier / Ingrassia	Toyota Yaris WRC	15:25.2	Rovanperä / Halttunen
10 September	SS6	Elatia	11.65 km	Neuville / Wydaeghe	Hyundai i20 Coupe WRC	5:58.1	Rovanperä / Halttunen
11 September	SS7	Pavliani 1	24.25 km	Rovanperä / Halttunen	Toyota Yaris WRC	19:27.7	Rovanperä / Halttunen
11 September	SS8	Gravia	24.81 km	Rovanperä / Halttunen	Toyota Yaris WRC	20:35.9	Rovanperä / Halttunen
11 September	SS9	Bauxites	22.97 km	Rovanperä / Halttunen	Toyota Yaris WRC	13:44.3	Rovanperä / Halttunen
11 September	SS10	Eleftherochori 1	18.14 km	Rovanperä / Halttunen	Toyota Yaris WRC	11:05.2	Rovanperä / Halttunen
11 September	SS11	Pavliani 2	24.25 km	Ogier / Ingrassia	Toyota Yaris WRC	19:10.6	Rovanperä / Halttunen
11 September	SS12	Eleftherochori 2	18.14 km	Tänak / Järveoja	Hyundai i20 Coupe WRC	10:42.0	Rovanperä / Halttunen
12 September	SS13	Tarzan 1	23.37 km	Rovanperä / Halttunen	Toyota Yaris WRC	17:22.7	Rovanperä / Halttunen
12 September	SS14	Pyrgos	33.20 km	Tänak / Järveoja	Hyundai i20 Coupe WRC	25:24.4	Rovanperä / Halttunen
12 September	SS15	Tarzan 2 [Power Stage]	12.68 km	Rovanperä / Halttunen	Toyota Yaris WRC	8:34.8	Rovanperä / Halttunen

==== Championship standings ====
Pos.	Drivers' championships			Co-drivers' championships			Manufacturers' championships		
Pos.	Move	Driver	Points	Move	Co-driver	Points	Move	Manufacturer	Points
1		Sébastien Ogier	180		Julien Ingrassia	180		Toyota Gazoo Racing WRT	397
2		Elfyn Evans	136		Scott Martin	136		Hyundai Shell Mobis WRT	340
3		Thierry Neuville	130		Martijn Wydaeghe	130		M-Sport Ford WRT	153
4		Kalle Rovanperä	129		Jonne Halttunen	129		Hyundai 2C Competition	44
5		Ott Tänak	106		Martin Järveoja	106			

=== World Rally Championship-2 ===
==== Classification ====
Position		No.	Driver	Co-driver	Entrant	Car	Time	Difference	Points		
Event	Class	No.	Driver	Co-driver	Entrant	Car	Time	Difference	Class	Stage	Event
9	1	20	Andreas Mikkelsen	Elliott Edmondson	Toksport WRT	Škoda Fabia Rally2 evo	3:37:27.1	0.0	25	3	2
10	2	22	Marco Bulacia Wilkinson	Marcelo Der Ohannesian	Toksport WRT	Škoda Fabia Rally2 evo	3:37:43.8	+16.7	18	4	0
13	3	23	Nikolay Gryazin	Konstantin Aleksandrov	Movisport	Ford Fiesta Rally2	3:42:12.1	+4:45.0	15	1	1
15	4	27	Georg Linnamäe	James Morgan	ALM Motorsport	Škoda Fabia Rally2 evo	3:43:29.1	+6:02.0	12	2	0
16	5	25	Martin Prokop	Michal Ernst	M-Sport Ford WRT	Ford Fiesta Rally2	3:46:29.8	+9:02.7	10	0	0
17	6	26	Sean Johnston	Alex Kihurani	Saintéloc Junior Team	Citroën C3 Rally2	3:46:54.7	+9:27.6	8	0	0
20	7	29	Crazy Leo	Tom Woodburn	Saintéloc Junior Team	Citroën C3 Rally2	3:55:38.8	+18:11.7	6	0	0
31	8	21	Mads Østberg	Torstein Eriksen	TRT World Rally Team	Citroën C3 Rally2	4:18:17.5	+40:50.4	4	5	0
Retired SS9		28	Oliver Solberg	Aaron Johnston	Hyundai Motorsport N	Hyundai i20 N Rally2	Crash		0	0	0
Did not start		20	Teemu Suninen	Mikko Markkula	M-Sport Ford WRT	Ford Fiesta Rally2	Withdrawn		0	0	0

==== Special stages ====
Day	Stage	Stage name	Length	Winners	Car	Time	Class leaders
9 September	—	Divri [Shakedown]	4.32 km	Østberg / Eriksen	Citroën C3 Rally2	3:26.7	—N/a
9 September	SS1	Cosmote 5G Athens Stage	0.98 km	Mikkelsen / Edmondson; Østberg / Eriksen	Škoda Fabia Rally2 evo Citroën C3 Rally2	52.8	Mikkelsen / Edmondson; Østberg / Eriksen
10 September	SS2	Aghii Theodori 1	17.54 km	Solberg / Johnston	Hyundai i20 N Rally2	13:44.2	Solberg / Johnston
10 September	SS3	Loutraki	19.40 km	Bulacia Wilkinson / Der Ohannesian	Škoda Fabia Rally2 evo	13:46.4	Solberg / Johnston
10 September	SS4	Aghii Theodori 2	17.54 km	Mikkelsen / Edmondson	Škoda Fabia Rally2 evo	13:46.9	Mikkelsen / Edmondson
10 September	SS5	Thiva	23.27 km	Bulacia Wilkinson / Der Ohannesian	Škoda Fabia Rally2 evo	16:03.4	Bulacia Wilkinson / Der Ohannesian
10 September	SS6	Elatia	11.65 km	Bulacia Wilkinson / Der Ohannesian	Škoda Fabia Rally2 evo	6:13.5	Bulacia Wilkinson / Der Ohannesian
11 September	SS7	Pavliani 1	24.25 km	Mikkelsen / Edmondson	Škoda Fabia Rally2 evo	20:03.0	Mikkelsen / Edmondson
11 September	SS8	Gravia	24.81 km	Solberg / Johnston	Hyundai i20 N Rally2	21:06.8	Mikkelsen / Edmondson
11 September	SS9	Bauxites	22.97 km	Østberg / Eriksen	Citroën C3 Rally2	14:24.7	Mikkelsen / Edmondson
11 September	SS10	Eleftherochori 1	18.14 km	Stage cancelled			
11 September	SS11	Pavliani 2	24.25 km	Bulacia Wilkinson / Der Ohannesian	Škoda Fabia Rally2 evo	19:48.5	Mikkelsen / Edmondson
11 September	SS12	Eleftherochori 2	18.14 km	Bulacia Wilkinson / Der Ohannesian	Škoda Fabia Rally2 evo	11:28.6	Bulacia Wilkinson / Der Ohannesian
12 September	SS13	Tarzan 1	23.37 km	Mikkelsen / Edmondson	Škoda Fabia Rally2 evo	18:10.4	Mikkelsen / Edmondson
12 September	SS14	Pyrgos	33.20 km	Mikkelsen / Edmondson	Škoda Fabia Rally2 evo	26:07.2	Mikkelsen / Edmondson
12 September	SS15	Tarzan 2 [Power Stage]	12.68 km	Østberg / Eriksen	Citroën C3 Rally2	9:00.2	Mikkelsen / Edmondson

==== Championship standings ====
Pos.	Drivers' championships			Co-drivers' championships			Teams' championships		
Pos.	Move	Driver	Points	Move	Co-driver	Points	Move	Manufacturer	Points
1		Andreas Mikkelsen	126	2	Marcelo Der Ohannesian	104		Toksport WRT	211
2	1	Marco Bulacia Wilkinson	104	1	Ola Fløene	98		M-Sport Ford WRT	131
3	1	Mads Østberg	96	1	Torstein Eriksen	96		Movisport	125
4	2	Nikolay Gryazin	67	2	Konstantin Aleksandrov	67		Hyundai Motorsport N	37
5	1	Jari Huttunen	60	1	Mikko Lukka	60	New entry	Saintéloc Junior Team	27

=== World Rally Championship-3 ===
==== Classification ====
Position		No.	Driver	Co-driver	Entrant	Car	Time	Difference	Points		
Event	Class	No.	Driver	Co-driver	Entrant	Car	Time	Difference	Class	Stage	Event
11	1	31	Kajetan Kajetanowicz	Maciej Szczepaniak	Kajetan Kajetanowicz	Škoda Fabia Rally2 evo	3:39:48.2	0.0	25	5	0
12	2	34	Chris Ingram	Ross Whittock	Chris Ingram	Škoda Fabia Rally2 evo	3:40:14.3	+26.1	18	3	0
14	3	35	Emil Lindholm	Reeta Hämäläinen	Emil Lindholm	Škoda Fabia Rally2 evo	3:42:20.2	+2:32.0	15	4	0
19	4	45	Giorgos Kehagias	Marios Tsaousoglou	Giorgos Kehagias	Škoda Fabia Rally2 evo	3:55:31.5	+15:43.3	12	0	0
21	5	46	Roustemis Panagiotis	Konstantinos Nikolopoulos	Roustemis Panagiotis	Citroën DS3 R5	3:55:39.3	+15:51.1	10	0	0
23	6	48	Vasileios Velanis	Ioannis Velanis	Vasileios Velanis	Škoda Fabia Rally2 evo	3:55:57.7	+16:09.5	8	0	0
24	7	43	Paulo Nobre	Gabriel Morales	Paulo Nobre	Škoda Fabia R5	3:58:29.7	+18:41.5	6	0	0
26	8	49	Ioannis Plagos	Alkiviadis Rentis	Ioannis Plagos	Citroën C3 Rally2	4:04:29.1	+24:40.9	4	0	0
33	9	32	Fabrizio Zaldivar	Carlos del Barrio	Fabrizio Zaldivar	Škoda Fabia Rally2 evo	4:31:45.9	+51:57.7	2	2	0
34	10	47	Panagiotis Hatzitsopanis	Nikolaos Petropoulos	Panagiotis Hatzitsopanis	Ford Fiesta Rally2	4:38:27.6	+58:39.4	1	0	0
35	11	39	Miguel Díaz-Aboitiz	Diego Sanjuan de Eusebio	Miguel Díaz-Aboitiz	Škoda Fabia Rally2 evo	4:48:19.5	+1:08:31.3	0	0	0
36	12	40	Lambros Athanassoulas	Nikolaos Zakheos	Lambros Athanassoulas	Hyundai i20 N Rally2	4:52:38.2	+1:12:50.0	0	1	0
Disqualified		30	Yohan Rossel	Alexandre Coria	Yohan Rossel	Citroën C3 Rally2	Subframe		0	0	0
Retired SS2		41	Alex Tsouloftas	Stelios Elia	Alex Tsouloftas	Volkswagen Polo GTI R5	Mechanical		0	0	0

==== Special stages ====
Day	Stage	Stage name	Length	Winners	Car	Time	Class leaders
9 September	—	Divri [Shakedown]	4.32 km	Athanassoulas / Zakheos	Hyundai i20 N Rally2	3:37.8	—N/a
9 September	SS1	Cosmote 5G Athens Stage	0.98 km	Kajetanowicz / Szczepaniak	Škoda Fabia Rally2 evo	53.0	Kajetanowicz / Szczepaniak
10 September	SS2	Aghii Theodori 1	17.54 km	Ingram / Whittock	Škoda Fabia Rally2 evo	13:47.6	Ingram / Whittock
10 September	SS3	Loutraki	19.40 km	Kajetanowicz / Szczepaniak	Škoda Fabia Rally2 evo	13:52.7	Ingram / Whittock
10 September	SS4	Aghii Theodori 2	17.54 km	Ingram / Whittock	Škoda Fabia Rally2 evo	13:50.9	Ingram / Whittock
10 September	SS5	Thiva	23.27 km	Kajetanowicz / Szczepaniak	Škoda Fabia Rally2 evo	16:06.8	Ingram / Whittock
10 September	SS6	Elatia	11.65 km	Lindholm / Hämäläinen	Škoda Fabia Rally2 evo	6:14.0	Ingram / Whittock
11 September	SS7	Pavliani 1	24.25 km	Ingram / Whittock	Škoda Fabia Rally2 evo	20:28.4	Ingram / Whittock
11 September	SS8	Gravia	24.81 km	Rossel / Coria	Citroën C3 Rally2	21:08.1	Ingram / Whittock
11 September	SS9	Bauxites	22.97 km	Kajetanowicz / Szczepaniak	Škoda Fabia Rally2 evo	14:24.4	Rossel / Coria
11 September	SS10	Eleftherochori 1	18.14 km	Stage cancelled			
11 September	SS11	Pavliani 2	24.25 km	Rossel / Coria	Citroën C3 Rally2	20:12.0	Rossel / Coria
11 September	SS12	Eleftherochori 2	18.14 km	Kajetanowicz / Szczepaniak	Škoda Fabia Rally2 evo	11:42.1	Rossel / Coria
12 September	SS13	Tarzan 1	23.37 km	Rossel / Coria	Citroën C3 Rally2	18:27.5	Rossel / Coria
12 September	SS14	Pyrgos	33.20 km	Rossel / Coria	Citroën C3 Rally2	26:08.9	Rossel / Coria
12 September	SS15	Tarzan 2 [Power Stage]	12.68 km	Kajetanowicz / Szczepaniak	Škoda Fabia Rally2 evo	9:03.2	Kajetanowicz / Szczepaniak

==== Championship standings ====
Pos.	Drivers' championships			Co-drivers' championships		
Pos.	Move	Driver	Points	Move	Co-driver	Points
1		Yohan Rossel	127	1	Maciek Szczepaniak	112
2		Kajetan Kajetanowicz	112	1	Alexandre Coria	99
3		Nicolas Ciamin	57		Yannick Roche	57
4	6	Chris Ingram	49	3	Ross Whittock	49
5	6	Emil Lindholm	45	1	Carlos del Barrio	43

== Notes ==
Previous rally: 2021 Ypres Rally	2021 FIA World Rally Championship	Next rally: 2021 Rally Finland
Previous rally: 2018 Acropolis Rally	2021 Acropolis Rally	Next rally: 2022 Acropolis Rally
