= 2021 Rally Finland =

Motor rally competition

2021 Rally Finland Secto Rally Finland 2021
Round 10 of 12 in the 2021 World Rally Championship
← Previous event	Next event →
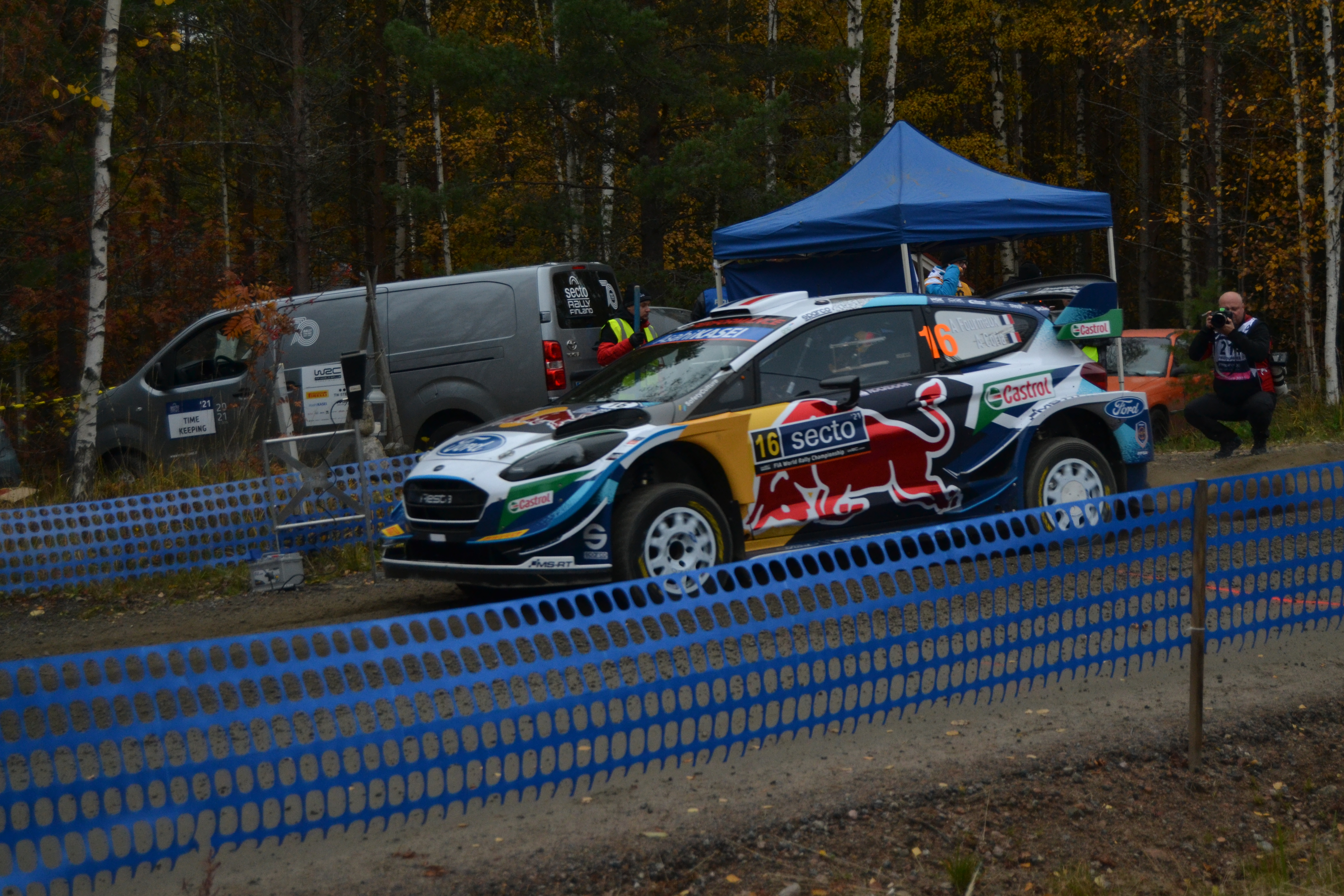
- Adrien Fourmaux and Alexandre Coria at the start line of a special stage during the event.
- Host country: Finland
- Rally base: Jyväskylä, Central Finland
- Dates run: 1 – 3 October 2021
- Start location: Jyväskylä, Central Finland
- Finish location: Ruuhimäki, Toivakka
- Stages: 19 (287.11 km; 178.40 miles)
- Stage surface: Gravel
- Transport distance: 772.12 km (479.77 miles)
- Overall distance: 1,059.23 km (658.18 miles)

Statistics
- Crews registered: 43
- Crews: 43 at start, 37 at finish

Overall results
- Overall winner: (United Kingdom) Elfyn Evans (United Kingdom) Scott Martin (Japan) Toyota Gazoo Racing WRT; 2:19:13.7
- Power Stage winner: (United Kingdom) Elfyn Evans (United Kingdom) Scott Martin (Japan) Toyota Gazoo Racing WRT; 5:18.9

Support category results
- WRC-2 winner: (Finland) Teemu Suninen (Finland) Mikko Markkula (Italy) Movisport; 2:29:05.8
- WRC-3 winner: (Finland) Emil Lindholm (Finland) Reeta Hämäläinen; 2:30:06.5

The 2021 Rally Finland (also known as the Secto Rally Finland 2021) was a motor racing event for rally cars that was held over three days between 1 and 3 October 2021. It marked the seventieth running of the Rally Finland. The event was the tenth round of the 2021 World Rally Championship, World Rally Championship-2 and World Rally Championship-3. The 2021 event was based in Jyväskylä in Central Finland and was contested over nineteen special stages totalling 287.11 km (178.40 mi) in competitive distance.

Ott Tänak and Martin Järveoja were the defending rally winners. The team they drove for in 2019, Toyota Gazoo Racing WRT, were the defending manufacturers' winners. Kalle Rovanperä and Jonne Halttunen were the defending winners in the WRC-2 category, (Note: The championship was known as the World Rally Championship-2 Pro in 2019.) but they did not defend their titles, as they were promoted to the top class by Toyota. In the WRC-3 category, Tom Kristensson and Henrik Appelskog were the reigning rally winners, (Note: The championship was known as the World Rally Championship-2 in 2019.) but they did not defend their titles neither, as Kristensson was promoted to the WRC-2 class by M-Sport Ford World Rally Team.

Elfyn Evans and Scott Martin won the rally for the first time and their second of their season. Their team, Toyota Gazoo Racing WRT, successfully defended their titles. In the World Rally Championship-2 category, Teemu Suninen and Mikko Markkula won the event. The local crew of Emil Lindholm and Reeta Hämäläinen took their maiden victory in the World Rally Championship-3 category.

== Background ==
=== Championship standings prior to the event ===
Reigning World Champions Sébastien Ogier and Julien Ingrassia entered the round with a forty-four-point lead over Elfyn Evans and Scott Martin. Thierry Neuville and Martijn Wydaeghe were third, a further six points behind. In the World Rally Championship for Manufacturers, Toyota Gazoo Racing WRT held a massive fifty-seven-point lead over defending manufacturers' champions Hyundai Shell Mobis WRT, followed by M-Sport Ford WRT.

In the World Rally Championship-2 standings, Andreas Mikkelsen led Marco Bulacia Wilkinson by twenty-two points in the drivers' championship, with Mads Østberg in third. In the co-drivers' championship Marcelo Der Ohannesian held a six-point lead over Ola Fløene, with Torstein Eriksen in third.

In the World Rally Championship-3 standings, Yohan Rossel led Kajetan Kajetanowicz by fifteen points in the drivers' championship, with Nicolas Ciamin in third. In the co-drivers' championship Maciek Szczepaniak held a thirteen-point lead over Alexandre Coria, with Yannick Roche in third.

=== Entry list ===
The following crews entered the rally. The event was open to crews competing in the World Rally Championship, its support categories, the World Rally Championship-2 and World Rally Championship-3, and privateer entries that were not registered to score points in any championship. Nine entries for the World Rally Championship are received, as were eight in the World Rally Championship-2 and fourteen in the World Rally Championship-3.

Rally1 entries competing in the World Rally Championship
No.	Driver	Co-Driver	Entrant	Car	Tyre
1	(France) Sébastien Ogier	(France) Julien Ingrassia	(Japan) Toyota Gazoo Racing WRT	Toyota Yaris WRC	P
4	(Finland) Esapekka Lappi	(Finland) Janne Ferm	(Finland) RTE-Motorsport	Toyota Yaris WRC	P
8	(Estonia) Ott Tänak	(Estonia) Martin Järveoja	(South Korea) Hyundai Shell Mobis WRT	Hyundai i20 Coupe WRC	P
11	(Belgium) Thierry Neuville	(Belgium) Martijn Wydaeghe	(South Korea) Hyundai Shell Mobis WRT	Hyundai i20 Coupe WRC	P
16	(France) Adrien Fourmaux	(France) Alexandre Coria	(United Kingdom) M-Sport Ford WRT	Ford Fiesta WRC	P
18	(Japan) Takamoto Katsuta	(Republic of Ireland) Aaron Johnston	(Japan) Toyota Gazoo Racing WRT	Toyota Yaris WRC	P
33	(United Kingdom) Elfyn Evans	(United Kingdom) Scott Martin	(Japan) Toyota Gazoo Racing WRT	Toyota Yaris WRC	P
42	(Republic of Ireland) Craig Breen	(Republic of Ireland) Paul Nagle	(South Korea) Hyundai Shell Mobis WRT	Hyundai i20 Coupe WRC	P
44	(United Kingdom) Gus Greensmith	(Republic of Ireland) Chris Patterson	(United Kingdom) M-Sport Ford WRT	Ford Fiesta WRC	P
69	(Finland) Kalle Rovanperä	(Finland) Jonne Halttunen	(Japan) Toyota Gazoo Racing WRT	Toyota Yaris WRC	P

Rally2 entries competing in the World Rally Championship-2
No.	Driver	Co-Driver	Entrant	Car	Tyre
20	(Norway) Mads Østberg	(Norway) Torstein Eriksen	(Hungary) TRT World Rally Team	Citroën C3 Rally2	P
21	(Finland) Jari Huttunen	(Finland) Mikko Lukka	(South Korea) Hyundai Motorsport N	Hyundai i20 N Rally2	P
22	Nikolay Gryazin (Note: Nikolay Gryazin is Russian, but he competes as a neutral competitor using the designation RAF (Russian Automobile Federation), as the Court of Arbitration for Sport upheld a ban on Russia competing at World Championships. The ban was implemented by the World Anti-Doping Agency in response to state-sponsored doping program of Russian athletes.)	Konstantin Aleksandrov (Note: Konstantin Aleksandrov is Russian, but he competes as a neutral competitor using the designation RAF (Russian Automobile Federation), as the Court of Arbitration for Sport upheld a ban on Russia competing at World Championships. The ban was implemented by the World Anti-Doping Agency in response to state-sponsored doping program of Russian athletes.)	(Italy) Movisport	Volkswagen Polo GTI R5	P
23	(Finland) Teemu Suninen	(Finland) Mikko Markkula	(Italy) Movisport	Volkswagen Polo GTI R5	P
24	(Czech Republic) Martin Prokop	(Czech Republic) Michal Ernst	(United Kingdom) M-Sport Ford WRT	Ford Fiesta Rally2	P
25	(Sweden) Tom Kristensson	(Sweden) David Arhusiander	(United Kingdom) M-Sport Ford WRT	Ford Fiesta Rally2	P
26	(Estonia) Georg Linnamäe	(United Kingdom) James Morgan	(Estonia) ALM Motorsport	Volkswagen Polo GTI R5	P
27	(Sweden) Oliver Solberg	(United Kingdom) Craig Drew	(South Korea) Hyundai Motorsport N	Hyundai i20 N Rally2	P

Rally2 entries competing in the World Rally Championship-3 (Note: Under the Sporting Regulations, each car competing in the World Rally Championship-3 is entered under the driver's name.)
No.	Driver	Co-Driver	Entrant	Car	Tyre
28	(Spain) Pepe López	(Spain) Borja Odriozola	(Spain) Pepe López	Škoda Fabia Rally2 evo	P
29	(Estonia) Egon Kaur	(Estonia) Silver Simm	(Estonia) Kaur Motorsport	Volkswagen Polo GTI R5	P
30	(Finland) Mikko Heikkilä	(Finland) Topi Luhtinen	(Finland) Mikko Heikkilä	Škoda Fabia Rally2 evo	P
31	(Finland) Teemu Asunmaa	(Finland) Marko Salminen	(Finland) Teemu Asunmaa	Škoda Fabia Rally2 evo	P
32	(Finland) Emil Lindholm	(Finland) Reeta Hämäläinen	(Finland) Emil Lindholm	Škoda Fabia Rally2 evo	P
34	(Finland) Eerik Pietarinen	(Finland) Antti Linnaketo	(Finland) Eerik Pietarinen	Volkswagen Polo GTI R5	P
35	(Estonia) Raul Jeets	(Estonia) Andrus Toom	(Estonia) Raul Jeets	Škoda Fabia Rally2 evo	P
36	(Spain) Miguel Díaz-Aboitiz	(Spain) Diego Sanjuan de Eusebio	(Spain) Miguel Díaz-Aboitiz	Škoda Fabia Rally2 evo	P
37	(Finland) Riku Tahko	(Finland) Markus Soininen	(Finland) Riku Tahko	Hyundai i20 R5	P
38	(Finland) Juuso Metsälä	(Finland) Matti Kangas	(Finland) Juuso Metsälä	Škoda Fabia R5	P
39	(Finland) Lauri Joona	(Finland) Mikael Korhonen	(Finland) Lauri Joona	Škoda Fabia R5	P
40	(Czech Republic) Martin Vlček	(Czech Republic) Karolína Jugasová	(Czech Republic) Martin Vlček	Hyundai i20 R5	P
41	(Finland) Jari Huuhka	(Finland) Jarno Metso	(Finland) Jari Huuhka	Škoda Fabia R5	P
43	(Brazil) Paulo Nobre	(Brazil) Gabriel Morales	(Brazil) Paulo Nobre	Škoda Fabia R5	P

Other major entries
No.	Driver	Co-Driver	Entrant	Car	Tyre
45	(Finland) Jani Paasonen	(Finland) Arto Kapanen	(Finland) Team Capitalbox	Ford Fiesta R5	P
46	(Australia) Molly Taylor	(United Kingdom) Sebastian Marshall	M-Sport Poland	Ford Fiesta Rally3	P

=== Route ===
==== Itinerary ====
All dates and times are EEST (UTC+3).

Leg	Date	Time	No.	Stage name	Distance
—N/a	1 October	08:01	—	Vesala [Shakedown]	4.04 km
1	1 October	13:30	SS1	Harju 1	2.31 km
1	1 October	14:28	SS2	Ässämäki 1	12.31 km
1	1 October	15:18	SS3	Sahloinen — Moksi 1	21.37 km
1	1 October	17:08	SS4	Ässämäki 2	12.31 km
1	1 October	17:58	SS5	Sahloinen — Moksi 2	21.37 km
1	1 October	19:00	SS6	Oittila	19.75 km
2	2 October	08:16	SS7	Kakaristo — Hassi 1	18.17 km
2	2 October	09:14	SS8	Päijälä 1	22.61 km
2	2 October	10:38	SS9	Arvaja 1	13.49 km
2	2 October	11:28	SS10	Patajoki 1	20.55 km
2	2 October	15:16	SS11	Kakaristo — Hassi 2	18.17 km
2	2 October	16:14	SS12	Päijälä 2	22.61 km
2	2 October	17:38	SS13	Arvaja 2	13.49 km
2	2 October	18:28	SS14	Patajoki 2	20.55 km
2	2 October	20:00	SS15	Harju 2	2.31 km
3	3 October	08:35	SS16	Laukaa 1	11.75 km
3	3 October	09:38	SS17	Ruuhimäki 1	11.12 km
3	3 October	11:01	SS18	Laukaa 2	11.75 km
3	3 October	13:18	SS19	Ruuhimäki 2 [Power Stage]	11.12 km

== Report ==
=== World Rally Cars ===
==== Classification ====
Position		No.	Driver	Co-driver	Entrant	Car	Time	Difference	Points	
Event	Class	No.	Driver	Co-driver	Entrant	Car	Time	Difference	Event	Stage
1	1	33	Elfyn Evans	Scott Martin	Toyota Gazoo Racing WRT	Toyota Yaris WRC	2:19:13.7	0.0	25	5
2	2	8	Ott Tänak	Martin Järveoja	Hyundai Shell Mobis WRT	Hyundai i20 Coupe WRC	2:19:27.8	+14.1	18	4
3	3	42	Craig Breen	Paul Nagle	Hyundai Shell Mobis WRT	Hyundai i20 Coupe WRC	2:19:55.9	+42.2	15	1
4	4	4	Esapekka Lappi	Janne Ferm	RTE-Motorsport	Toyota Yaris WRC	2:20:12.5	+58.8	12	3
5	5	1	Sébastien Ogier	Julien Ingrassia	Toyota Gazoo Racing WRT	Toyota Yaris WRC	2:22:08.1	+2:54.4	10	0
6	6	44	Gus Greensmith	Chris Patterson	M-Sport Ford WRT	Ford Fiesta WRC	2:24:16.0	+5:02.3	8	0
7	7	16	Adrien Fourmaux	Alexandre Coria	M-Sport Ford WRT	Ford Fiesta WRC	2:25:36.6	+6:22.9	6	0
34	8	69	Kalle Rovanperä	Jonne Halttunen	Toyota Gazoo Racing WRT	Toyota Yaris WRC	3:22:05.4	+1:02:51.7	0	0
37	9	18	Takamoto Katsuta	Aaron Johnston	Toyota Gazoo Racing WRT	Toyota Yaris WRC	3:40:47.2	+1:21:33.5	0	2
Retired SS14		11	Thierry Neuville	Martijn Wydaeghe	Hyundai Shell Mobis WRT	Hyundai i20 Coupe WRC	Radiator		0	0

==== Special stages ====
Day	Stage	Stage name	Length	Winners	Car	Time	Class leaders
1 October	—	Vesala [Shakedown]	4.04 km	Tänak / Järveoja	Hyundai i20 Coupe WRC	1:46.5	—N/a
1 October	SS1	Harju 1	2.31 km	Katsuta / Johnston	Toyota Yaris WRC	1:49.7	Katsuta / Johnston
1 October	SS2	Ässämäki 1	12.31 km	Breen / Nagle	Hyundai i20 Coupe WRC	5:44.8	Tänak / Järveoja
1 October	SS3	Sahloinen — Moksi 1	21.37 km	Tänak / Järveoja	Hyundai i20 Coupe WRC	10:14.5	Tänak / Järveoja
1 October	SS4	Ässämäki 2	12.31 km	Tänak / Järveoja	Hyundai i20 Coupe WRC	5:35.9	Tänak / Järveoja
1 October	SS5	Sahloinen — Moksi 2	21.37 km	Breen / Nagle	Hyundai i20 Coupe WRC	9:56.7	Tänak / Järveoja
1 October	SS6	Oittila	19.75 km	Evans / Martin	Toyota Yaris WRC	10:21.5	Breen / Nagle
2 October	SS7	Kakaristo — Hassi 1	18.17 km	Evans / Martin	Toyota Yaris WRC	8:34.5	Breen / Nagle
2 October	SS8	Päijälä 1	22.61 km	Evans / Martin	Toyota Yaris WRC	10:28.9	Evans / Martin
2 October	SS9	Arvaja 1	13.49 km	Evans / Martin	Toyota Yaris WRC	6:55.0	Evans / Martin
2 October	SS10	Patajoki 1	20.55 km	Evans / Martin	Toyota Yaris WRC	10:19.8	Evans / Martin
2 October	SS11	Kakaristo — Hassi 2	18.17 km	Tänak / Järveoja	Hyundai i20 Coupe WRC	8:23.5	Evans / Martin
2 October	SS12	Päijälä 2	22.61 km	Tänak / Järveoja	Hyundai i20 Coupe WRC	10:18.5	Evans / Martin
2 October	SS13	Arvaja 2	13.49 km	Tänak / Järveoja	Hyundai i20 Coupe WRC	6:49.5	Evans / Martin
2 October	SS14	Patajoki 2	20.55 km	Evans / Martin	Toyota Yaris WRC	10:09.2	Evans / Martin
2 October	SS15	Harju 2	2.31 km	Tänak / Järveoja; Evans / Martin	Hyundai i20 Coupe WRC; Toyota Yaris WRC	1:48.4	Evans / Martin
3 October	SS16	Laukaa 1	11.75 km	Tänak / Järveoja	Hyundai i20 Coupe WRC	5:24.2	Evans / Martin
3 October	SS17	Ruuhimäki 1	11.12 km	Evans / Martin	Toyota Yaris WRC	5:25.5	Evans / Martin
3 October	SS18	Laukaa 2	11.75 km	Evans / Martin	Toyota Yaris WRC	5:18.0	Evans / Martin
3 October	SS19	Ruuhimäki 2 [Power Stage]	11.12 km	Evans / Martin	Toyota Yaris WRC	5:18.9	Evans / Martin

==== Championship standings ====
Pos.	Drivers' championships			Co-drivers' championships			Manufacturers' championships		
Pos.	Move	Driver	Points	Move	Co-driver	Points	Move	Manufacturer	Points
1		Sébastien Ogier	190		Julien Ingrassia	190		Toyota Gazoo Racing WRT	439
2		Elfyn Evans	166		Scott Martin	166		Hyundai Shell Mobis WRT	378
3		Thierry Neuville	130		Martijn Wydaeghe	130		M-Sport Ford WRT	171
4		Kalle Rovanperä	129		Jonne Halttunen	129		Hyundai 2C Competition	44
5		Ott Tänak	128		Martin Järveoja	128			

=== World Rally Championship-2 ===
==== Classification ====
Position		No.	Driver	Co-driver	Entrant	Car	Time	Difference	Points		
Event	Class	No.	Driver	Co-driver	Entrant	Car	Time	Difference	Class	Stage	Event
8	1	23	Teemu Suninen	Mikko Markkula	Movisport	Volkswagen Polo GTI R5	2:29:05.8	0.0	25	5	4
9	2	21	Mads Østberg	Torstein Eriksen	TRT World Rally Team	Citroën C3 Rally2	2:29:21.5	+15.7	18	4	2
11	3	21	Jari Huttunen	Mikko Lukka	Hyundai Motorsport N	Hyundai i20 N Rally2	2:51:32.9	+21:08.7	15	3	0
16	4	24	Martin Prokop	Michal Ernst	M-Sport Ford WRT	Ford Fiesta Rally2	2:39:19.9	+10:14.1	12	1	0
17	5	26	Georg Linnamäe	James Morgan	ALM Motorsport	Volkswagen Polo GTI R5	2:39:25.0	+10:19.2	10	0	0
36	6	22	Nikolay Gryazin	Konstantin Aleksandrov	Movisport	Volkswagen Polo GTI R5	3:30:46.8	+1:01:41.0	8	2	0
Retired SS11		25	Tom Kristensson	David Arhusiander	M-Sport Ford WRT	Ford Fiesta Rally2	Radiator		0	0	0
Retired SS7		27	Oliver Solberg	Craig Drew	Hyundai Motorsport N	Hyundai i20 N Rally2	Crash		0	0	0

==== Special stages ====
Day	Stage	Stage name	Length	Winners	Car	Time	Class leaders
1 October	—	Vesala [Shakedown]	4.04 km	Suninen / Markkula	Volkswagen Polo GTI R5	1:55.0	—N/a
1 October	SS1	Harju 1	2.31 km	Østberg / Eriksen	Citroën C3 Rally2	1:54.3	Østberg / Eriksen
1 October	SS2	Ässämäki 1	12.31 km	Suninen / Markkula	Volkswagen Polo GTI R5	6:08.7	Østberg / Eriksen
1 October	SS3	Sahloinen — Moksi 1	21.37 km	Østberg / Eriksen	Citroën C3 Rally2	10:54.6	Østberg / Eriksen
1 October	SS4	Ässämäki 2	12.31 km	Suninen / Markkula	Volkswagen Polo GTI R5	6:03.3	Østberg / Eriksen
1 October	SS5	Sahloinen — Moksi 2	21.37 km	Gryazin / Aleksandrov	Volkswagen Polo GTI R5	10:42.0	Østberg / Eriksen
1 October	SS6	Oittila	19.75 km	Suninen / Markkula	Volkswagen Polo GTI R5	11:03.8	Suninen / Markkula
2 October	SS7	Kakaristo — Hassi 1	18.17 km	Suninen / Markkula	Volkswagen Polo GTI R5	9:08.7	Suninen / Markkula
2 October	SS8	Päijälä 1	22.61 km	Suninen / Markkula	Volkswagen Polo GTI R5	11:13.4	Suninen / Markkula
2 October	SS9	Arvaja 1	13.49 km	Østberg / Eriksen	Citroën C3 Rally2	7:26.4	Suninen / Markkula
2 October	SS10	Patajoki 1	20.55 km	Østberg / Eriksen	Citroën C3 Rally2	11:07.4	Suninen / Markkula
2 October	SS11	Kakaristo — Hassi 2	18.17 km	Suninen / Markkula	Volkswagen Polo GTI R5	8:59.9	Suninen / Markkula
2 October	SS12	Päijälä 2	22.61 km	Østberg / Eriksen	Citroën C3 Rally2	10:59.3	Suninen / Markkula
2 October	SS13	Arvaja 2	13.49 km	Østberg / Eriksen	Citroën C3 Rally2	7:17.0	Suninen / Markkula
2 October	SS14	Patajoki 2	20.55 km	Suninen / Markkula	Volkswagen Polo GTI R5	11:02.1	Suninen / Markkula
2 October	SS15	Harju 2	2.31 km	Huttunen / Lukka	Hyundai i20 N Rally2	1:51.8	Suninen / Markkula
3 October	SS16	Laukaa 1	11.75 km	Gryazin / Aleksandrov	Volkswagen Polo GTI R5	5:43.8	Suninen / Markkula
3 October	SS17	Ruuhimäki 1	11.12 km	Suninen / Markkula	Volkswagen Polo GTI R5	5:47.6	Suninen / Markkula
3 October	SS18	Laukaa 2	11.75 km	Gryazin / Aleksandrov	Volkswagen Polo GTI R5	5:37.2	Suninen / Markkula
3 October	SS19	Ruuhimäki 2 [Power Stage]	11.12 km	Suninen / Markkula	Volkswagen Polo GTI R5	5:44.3	Suninen / Markkula

==== Championship standings ====
Pos.	Drivers' championships			Co-drivers' championships			Teams' championships		
Pos.	Move	Driver	Points	Move	Co-driver	Points	Move	Manufacturer	Points
1		Andreas Mikkelsen	126	2	Torstein Eriksen	118		Toksport WRT	211
2	1	Mads Østberg	118	1	Marcelo Der Ohannesian	104	1	Movisport	162
3	1	Marco Bulacia Wilkinson	104	1	Ola Fløene	98	1	M-Sport Ford WRT	146
4	1	Jari Huttunen	78	1	Mikko Lukka	78		Hyundai Motorsport N	55
5	1	Nikolay Gryazin	77	1	Konstantin Aleksandrov	77		Saintéloc Junior Team	27

=== World Rally Championship-3 ===
==== Classification ====
Position		No.	Driver	Co-driver	Entrant	Car	Time	Difference	Points		
Event	Class	No.	Driver	Co-driver	Entrant	Car	Time	Difference	Class	Stage	Event
10	1	32	Emil Lindholm	Reeta Hämäläinen	Emil Lindholm	Škoda Fabia Rally2 evo	2:30:06.5	0.0	25	3	1
12	2	30	Mikko Heikkilä	Topi Luhtinen	Mikko Heikkilä	Škoda Fabia Rally2 evo	2:31:07.8	+1:01.3	18	1	0
13	3	39	Lauri Joona	Mikael Korhonen	Lauri Joona	Škoda Fabia R5	2:35:03.0	+4:56.5	15	2	0
14	4	28	Pepe López	Borja Odriozola	Pepe López	Škoda Fabia Rally2 evo	2:35:47.1	+5:40.6	12	4	0
15	5	37	Riku Tahko	Markus Soininen	Riku Tahko	Hyundai i20 R5	2:37:47.4	+7:40.9	10	0	0
18	6	29	Egon Kaur	Silver Simm	Kaur Motorsport	Volkswagen Polo GTI R5	2:41:43.6	+11:37.1	8	5	0
19	7	35	Raul Jeets	Andrus Toom	Raul Jeets	Škoda Fabia Rally2 evo	2:44:06.6	+14:00.1	6	0	0
21	8	40	Martin Vlček	Karolína Jugasová	Martin Vlček	Hyundai i20 R5	2:51:37.5	+21:31.0	2	0	0
23	9	41	Jari Huuhka	Jarno Metso	Jari Huuhka	Škoda Fabia R5	2:54:51.3	+24:44.8	2	0	0
26	10	43	Paulo Nobre	Gabriel Morales	Paulo Nobre	Škoda Fabia R5	3:00:13.8	+30:07.3	1	0	0
29	11	38	Juuso Metsälä	Matti Kangas	Juuso Metsälä	Škoda Fabia R5	3:08:08.6	+38:02.1	0	0	0
30	12	36	Miguel Díaz-Aboitiz	Diego Sanjuan de Eusebio	Miguel Díaz-Aboitiz	Škoda Fabia Rally2 evo	3:09:05.0	+38:58.5	0	0	0
Retired SS18		31	Teemu Asunmaa	Marko Salminen	Teemu Asunmaa	Škoda Fabia Rally2 evo	Crash		0	0	0
Retired SS17		34	Eerik Pietarinen	Antti Linnaketo	Eerik Pietarinen	Volkswagen Polo GTI R5	Crash		0	0	0

==== Special stages ====
Day	Stage	Stage name	Length	Winners	Car	Time	Class leaders
1 October	—	Vesala [Shakedown]	4.04 km	Pietarinen / Linnaketo	Volkswagen Polo GTI R5	1:56.7	—N/a
1 October	SS1	Harju 1	2.31 km	Lindholm / Hämäläinen	Škoda Fabia Rally2 evo	1:54.3	Lindholm / Hämäläinen
1 October	SS2	Ässämäki 1	12.31 km	Lindholm / Hämäläinen	Škoda Fabia Rally2 evo	6:10.3	Lindholm / Hämäläinen
1 October	SS3	Sahloinen — Moksi 1	21.37 km	Heikkilä / Luhtinen	Škoda Fabia Rally2 evo	10:57.4	Lindholm / Hämäläinen
1 October	SS4	Ässämäki 2	12.31 km	Lindholm / Hämäläinen	Škoda Fabia Rally2 evo	6:04.3	Lindholm / Hämäläinen
1 October	SS5	Sahloinen — Moksi 2	21.37 km	Kaur / Simm	Volkswagen Polo GTI R5	10:46.2	Lindholm / Hämäläinen
1 October	SS6	Oittila	19.75 km	Lindholm / Hämäläinen	Škoda Fabia Rally2 evo	11:07.7	Lindholm / Hämäläinen
2 October	SS7	Kakaristo — Hassi 1	18.17 km	Lindholm / Hämäläinen	Škoda Fabia Rally2 evo	9:08.3	Lindholm / Hämäläinen
2 October	SS8	Päijälä 1	22.61 km	Lindholm / Hämäläinen	Škoda Fabia Rally2 evo	11:15.3	Lindholm / Hämäläinen
2 October	SS9	Arvaja 1	13.49 km	Lindholm / Hämäläinen; Pietarinen / Linnaketo	Škoda Fabia Rally2 evo Volkswagen Polo GTI R5	7:25.4	Lindholm / Hämäläinen
2 October	SS10	Patajoki 1	20.55 km	Heikkilä / Luhtinen	Škoda Fabia Rally2 evo	11:04.5	Lindholm / Hämäläinen
2 October	SS11	Kakaristo — Hassi 2	18.17 km	Lindholm / Hämäläinen	Škoda Fabia Rally2 evo	9:03.6	Lindholm / Hämäläinen
2 October	SS12	Päijälä 2	22.61 km	Heikkilä / Luhtinen	Škoda Fabia Rally2 evo	11:08.7	Lindholm / Hämäläinen
2 October	SS13	Arvaja 2	13.49 km	Lindholm / Hämäläinen	Škoda Fabia Rally2 evo	7:22.6	Lindholm / Hämäläinen
2 October	SS14	Patajoki 2	20.55 km	Lindholm / Hämäläinen	Škoda Fabia Rally2 evo	11:09.1	Lindholm / Hämäläinen
2 October	SS15	Harju 2	2.31 km	Lindholm / Hämäläinen; Pietarinen / Linnaketo	Škoda Fabia Rally2 evo Volkswagen Polo GTI R5	1:54.6	Lindholm / Hämäläinen
3 October	SS16	Laukaa 1	11.75 km	Pietarinen / Linnaketo	Volkswagen Polo GTI R5	5:47.8	Lindholm / Hämäläinen
3 October	SS17	Ruuhimäki 1	11.12 km	Kaur / Simm	Volkswagen Polo GTI R5	5:52.7	Lindholm / Hämäläinen
3 October	SS18	Laukaa 2	11.75 km	Kaur / Simm	Volkswagen Polo GTI R5	5:41.6	Lindholm / Hämäläinen
3 October	SS19	Ruuhimäki 2 [Power Stage]	11.12 km	Kaur / Simm	Volkswagen Polo GTI R5	5:45.3	Lindholm / Hämäläinen

==== Championship standings ====
Pos.	Drivers' championships			Co-drivers' championships		
Pos.	Move	Driver	Points	Move	Co-driver	Points
1		Yohan Rossel	127		Maciek Szczepaniak	112
2		Kajetan Kajetanowicz	112		Alexandre Coria	99
3	2	Emil Lindholm	73		Yannick Roche	57
4	1	Nicolas Ciamin	57	4	Reeta Hämäläinen	53
5	2	Pepe López	52	2	Topi Luhtinen	50

== Notes ==
Previous rally: 2021 Acropolis Rally	2021 FIA World Rally Championship	Next rally: 2021 Rally Catalunya
Previous rally: 2019 Rally Finland; 2020 edition cancelled	2021 Rally Finland	Next rally: 2022 Rally Finland
