= Kuldar Sikk =

Estonian rally co-driver (born 1979)

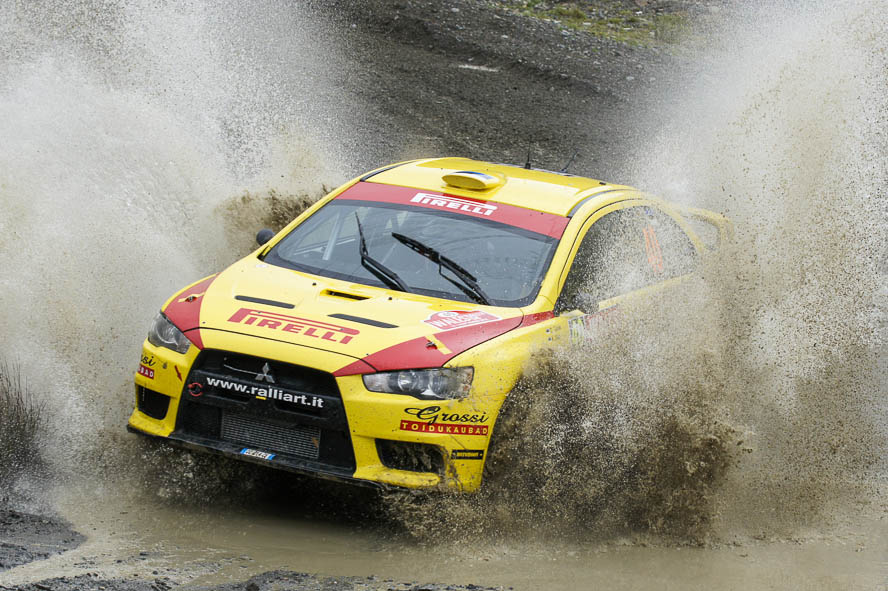

Personal information
- Nationality: (Estonia) Estonian
- Born: 20 June 1979 (age 47); Puhja, Estonia

World Rally Championship record
- Years active: 2003–2015, 2017–2020
- Driver: (Estonia) Urmo Aava (Estonia) Ott Tänak (Ukraine) Yuriy Protasov (Ukraine) Oleksiy Kikireshko (Estonia) Martin Kangur (Estonia) Raul Jeets (Estonia) Ken Torn (Estonia) Gregor Jeets
- Teams: OT Racing
- Rallies: 103
- Championships: 0
- Rally wins: 0
- Podiums: 1
- Stage wins: 15
- First rally: 2003 Monte Carlo Rally
- Last rally: 2020 Rally Estonia

Kuldar Sikk (born 20 June 1979) is an Estonian rally co-driver. From 2026, he is the co-driver of Urvo Männama. Sikk holds the record for the best overall result in a car class in the Baltics as well as for an Estonian co-driver.

== Dakar results ==
Year	Class	Starting number	Driver	Vehicle	Position
2023	Car	214	(Lithuania) Benediktas Vanagas	(Japan) Toyota Hilux Gazoo Racing DKR (aka BlackHawk VII)	DNF (4/14)
2024	Car	223	(Lithuania) Benediktas Vanagas	(Japan) Toyota Hilux Gazoo Racing DKR (aka BlackHawk VIII)	8

== Rally career ==
Sikk began his co-driver in 1998, co-driving for several drivers. In the 2003 Monte Carlo Rally, he made his WRC debut in a Suzuki Ignis S1600. The rally also marks the beginning of the partnership with Urmo Aava.

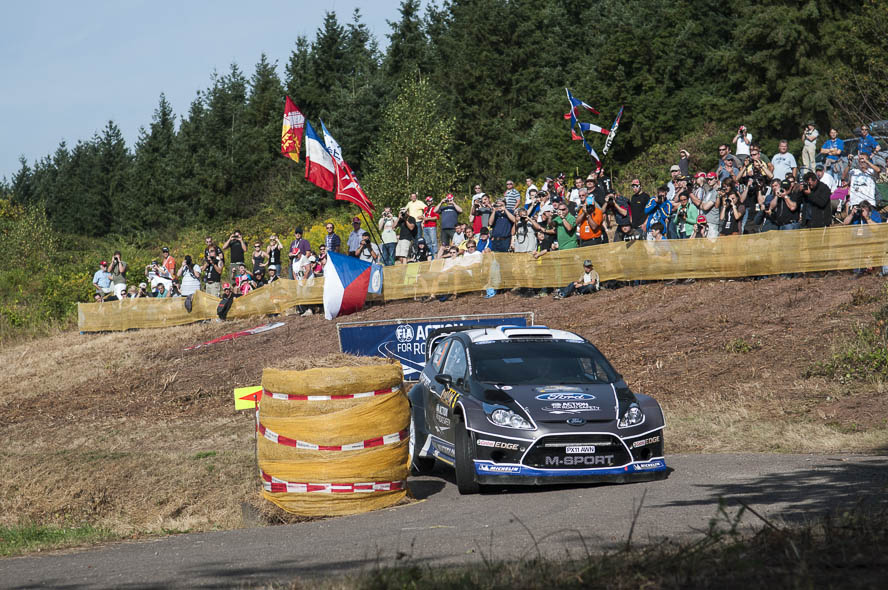
Ott Tänak and Kuldar Sikk in a Ford Fiesta RS WRC during 2012 Rallye Deutschland.

From 2010, Sikk became the co-driver of the rising star Ott Tänak. Two years later, in the 2012 Rally Sweden, the Estonian crew took their first stage win on SS14. Another five rounds later, Sikk achieved his first and only WRC podium finish.

After a short partnership with the Ukrainian rally driver Yuriy Protasov, Sikk was co-driving for three more drivers in 2016 and 2017.

Starting from 2018 Rally Sweden, Sikk became the co-driver of Ken Torn in the Junior World Rally Championship.

In 2026, it was announced that Sikk will partner up with Urvo Männama and they will start in the 2026 Rallye du Maroc to test for the upcoming Dakar Rally. They finished the rally in 17th place.

== Rally results ==
=== WRC results ===
Year	Entrant	Car	1	2	3	4	5	6	7	8	9	10	11	12	13	14	15	16	WDC	Points
2003	Urmo Aava	Suzuki Ignis S1600	MON; 20	SWE	TUR; Ret	NZL	ARG	GRE; 19	CYP	GER	FIN; 25	AUS	ITA; Ret	FRA	ESP; 24	GBR; Ret			–	0
2004	Urmo Aava	Suzuki Ignis S1600	MON; 12	SWE	MEX	NZL	CYP	GRE; Ret	TUR; 16	ARG	FIN; 23	GER	JPN	GBR; Ret	ITA; Ret	FRA	ESP; Ret	AUS	–	0
2005	Urmo Aava	Suzuki Ignis S1600	MON; Ret	SWE	MEX	NZL	ITA; 19	CYP	TUR	GRE; 19	ARG	FIN; 16	GER; Ret	GBR	JPN	FRA; 19	ESP; 21	AUS	–	0
2006	Urmo Aava	Suzuki Swift S1600	MON	SWE; 22	MEX	ESP	FRA; 17	ARG	ITA; 18	GRE	GER	FIN; DSQ	JPN	CYP	TUR; 16	AUS	NZL	GBR; 42	–	0
2007	Urmo Aava	Suzuki Swift S1600	MON	SWE	NOR; 28	MEX	POR; 15	ARG	ITA; 13			GER; 12		ESP; 18	FRA; Ret	JPN; 15	IRE	GBR	19th	3
2007	Urmo Aava	Mitsubishi Lancer WRC05								GRE; 14	FIN; 7		NZL; 8						19th	3
2008	World Rally Team Estonia	Citroën C4 WRC	MON	SWE; 18	MEX	ARG	JOR; Ret	ITA; 8	GRE; 4	TUR; Ret	FIN; 15	GER; 8	NZL; 5	ESP; Ret	FRA; 7	JPN	GBR		11th	13
2009	Stobart VK M-Sport Ford Rally Team	Ford Focus RS WRC 08	IRE; 10	NOR; 8	CYP	POR	ARG	ITA	GRE	POL									19th	1
2009	Urmo Aava	Honda Civic Type-R R3									FIN; 29	AUS	ESP	GBR					19th	1
2010	Ott Tänak	Subaru Impreza WRX STi	SWE; Ret	MEX	JOR														NC	0
2010	Pirelli Star Driver	Mitsubishi Lancer Evo X				TUR; Ret	NZL	POR; Ret	BUL	FIN; 18	GER; 31	JPN	FRA; 19	ESP	GBR; 17				NC	0
2011	MM Motorsport	Ford Fiesta S2000	SWE	MEX; 10	POR	JOR	ITA; 7	ARG	GRE; Ret	FIN; 13	GER; 12	AUS	FRA; 11	ESP; 27					15th	15
2011	M-Sport Stobart Ford World Rally Team	Ford Fiesta RS WRC													GBR; 6				15th	15
2012	M-Sport Ford World Rally Team	Ford Fiesta RS WRC	MON; 8	SWE; Ret	MEX; 5	POR; 14	ARG; 10	GRE; 9	NZL; Ret	FIN; 6	GER; Ret	GBR; Ret	FRA; 6	ITA; 3	ESP; Ret				8th	52
2013	Symtech Racing	Subaru Impreza STi R4	MON; 12	SWE; 15	MEX; 18	POR; 21	ARG; 18												NC	0
2013	MM Motorsport	Ford Fiesta RRC						GRE; 12	ITA; Ret	FIN; 15									NC	0
2013	MM Motorsport	Ford Fiesta R5									GER; 12	AUS; 11	FRA	ESP; Ret	GBR; Ret				NC	0
2014	Oleksiy Kikireshko	Mini Cooper S2000	MON	SWE	MEX	POR; Ret	ARG	ITA											NC	0
2014	Oleksiy Kikireshko	Ford Fiesta R5								FIN; Ret	GER	AUS	FRA	ESP					NC	0
2014	AT Rally Team	Ford Fiesta S2000							POL; Ret						GBR; Ret				NC	0
2015	EM Eurolamp WRT	Mini Cooper S2000	MON	SWE; 24	MEX	ARG	POR	ITA	POL	FIN	GER	AUS	FRA	ESP	GBR				NC	0
2017	Tehase Auto	Škoda Fabia R5	MON	SWE	MEX	FRA	ARG	POR	ITA	POL; Ret				GBR; 28	AUS				NC	0
2017	Raul Jeets	Škoda Fabia R5									FIN; 22	GER	ESP						NC	0
2018	OT Racing	Ford Fiesta R2T	MON	SWE; 54	MEX	FRA	ARG	POR; Ret	ITA	FIN; 19	GER	TUR; Ret	GBR	ESP	AUS				NC	0
2019	OT Racing	Ford Fiesta R2T	MON	SWE; 42	MEX	FRA	ARG	CHL	POR	ITA	FIN	GER	TUR	GBR	ESP	AUS; C			NC	0
2020	Gregor Jeets	Ford Fiesta Rally4	MON	SWE	MEX	EST; 32	TUR	ITA	MNZ										NC	0
