= 2009 Rally Australia =

2009 Rally Australia 20th Repco Rally Australia
Round 10 of the 2009 World Rally Championship
← Previous event	Next event →
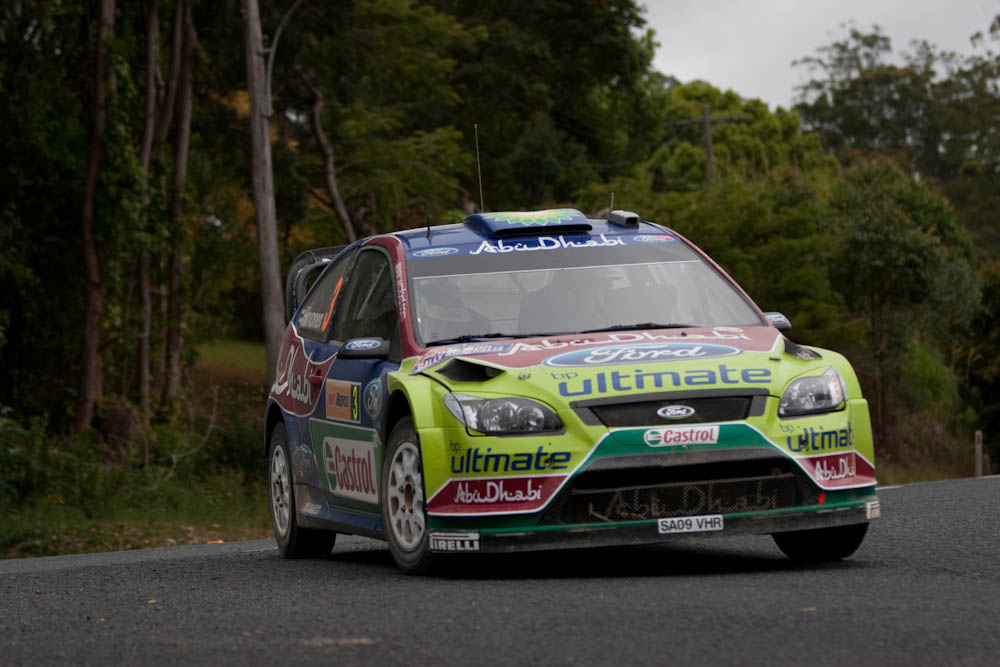
- Eventual winner Mikko Hirvonen during day one.
- Host country: Australia
- Rally base: Kingscliff
- Dates run: 3 – 6 September 2009
- Stages: 35
- Stage surface: Gravel

Statistics
- Crews: 40 at start, 25 at finish

Overall results
- Overall winner: (Finland) Mikko Hirvonen (United Kingdom) BP Ford WRT

The 2009 Repco Rally Australia was the 20th Rally Australia and the tenth round of the 2009 World Rally Championship season. The rally consisted of 35 special stages and was won on the road by Citroën's Sébastien Loeb. However, Loeb's win was short-lived as his Citroën along with those of his teammate Dani Sordo, and Sébastien Ogier were given one-minute time penalties for irregularities with their cars' anti-rollbars. Ford's Mikko Hirvonen inherited the win, for his fourth win in succession.

== Entries ==
The final entry list included 40 crews. 10 drivers contested in the World Rally Car class and 14 contested in the Production World Rally Championship class. This was the first time in the season that Petter Solberg and co-driver Phil Mills did not compete in their privately entered Citroën Xsara WRC since Rally Ireland.

== Protests ==
The event was disrupted by environmental activists protesting against the running of the rally, claiming that the event threatened local wildlife. One week before the rally, protesters unsuccessfully filed an injunction against the event in an effort to stop it. During the rally itself, signs were placed around the route of the rally, telling the drivers and those involved in the rally to go home. The CTEK East stages, scheduled to be held on 4 September as the sixth and eleventh stages of the rally, were cancelled after rocks were thrown at the course car and the stage itself was blocked when protesters pulled a fence across the road. Early reports also emerged claiming that protesters had taken animals killed on local roads and placed them along the rally route to give the appearance that wildlife had been killed by rally cars, though these reports were later denied. Following the cancellation of the CTEK East stages, New South Wales police announced that they would prosecute those responsible as public nuisances.

== Results ==
Pos.	Driver	Co-driver	Car	Time	Penalty	Difference	Points
WRC
1	(Finland) Mikko Hirvonen	(Finland) Jarmo Lehtinen	Ford Focus RS WRC 09	2:53:06.5		0.0	10
2	(France) Sébastien Loeb	(Monaco) Daniel Elena	Citroën C4 WRC	2:53:54.0	1:00	+47.5	8
3	(Spain) Dani Sordo	(Spain) Marc Martí	Citroën C4 WRC	2:54:11.1	1:00	+1:04.6	6
4	(Finland) Jari-Matti Latvala	(Finland) Miikka Anttila	Ford Focus RS WRC 09	2:54:58.5		+1:52.0	5
5	(France) Sébastien Ogier	(France) Julien Ingrassia	Citroën C4 WRC	2:55:29.8	1:00	+2:23.3	4
6	(United Kingdom) Matthew Wilson	(United Kingdom) Scott Martin	Ford Focus RS WRC 08	2:58:32.8		+5:26.3	3
7	(Norway) Henning Solberg	(Norway) Cato Menkerud	Ford Focus RS WRC 08	3:00:24.3	0:20	+7:17.8	2
8	(Argentina) Federico Villagra	(Argentina) Jorge Pérez Companc	Ford Focus RS WRC 08	3:00:45.9		+7:39.4	1
PWRC and class N4
1	(New Zealand) Hayden Paddon	(New Zealand) John Kennard	Mitsubishi Lancer Evolution IX	3:08:42.6		0.0	-
2	(Czech Republic) Martin Prokop	(Czech Republic) Jan Tománek	Mitsubishi Lancer Evolution IX	3:08:51.2		+8.6	10
3	(New Zealand) Richard Mason	(New Zealand) Sara Mason	Subaru Impreza WRX STi	3:09:33.4		+50.8	8
4	(Australia) Cody Crocker	(Australia) Ben Atkinson	Subaru Impreza WRX STi	3:10:26.5		+1:43.9	6
5	(Portugal) Armindo Araújo	(Portugal) Miguel Ramalho	Mitsubishi Lancer Evolution IX	3:12:59.3		+4:16.7	5
6	(New Zealand) Stewart Taylor	(New Zealand) Warwick Searle	Mitsubishi Lancer Evolution IX	3:14:30.3		+5:47.7	4
7	(New Zealand) John Gouasdoue	(New Zealand) Scott Beckwith	Mitsubishi Lancer Evolution VI	3:60:41.8	7:20	+21:59.2	-
8	(New Zealand) Stephen Tonna	(New Zealand) Lorell Tonna	Mitsubishi Lancer Evolution V	3:60:41.8	2:00	+21:59.2	-
9	(Italy) Gianluca Linari	(Italy) Massimo Salvucci	Subaru Impreza WRX STi	3:38:52.8		+30:01.6	3

== Special stages ==
Day	Stage	Time (AEST)	Name	Length	Winner	Time	Rally leader
1 (3-4 Sep)	SS1	18:53	Tweed 1	2.55 km	(France) Sébastien Ogier	1:49.0	(France) Sébastien Ogier
1 (3-4 Sep)	SS2	19:08	Tweed 2	2.55 km	(France) Sébastien Ogier	1:46.1	(France) Sébastien Ogier
1 (3-4 Sep)	SS3	7:38	Kyogle 1	7.32 km	(Finland) Jari-Matti Latvala	4:05.5	(France) Sébastien Ogier
1 (3-4 Sep)	SS4	8:36	Repco 1	22.41 km	(Finland) Mikko Hirvonen	10:27.3	(Finland) Jari-Matti Latvala
1 (3-4 Sep)	SS5	9:24	Kyogle 2	7.32 km	(Spain) Dani Sordo	3:59.1	(Finland) Jari-Matti Latvala
1 (3-4 Sep)	SS6	10:37	CTEK East 1	11.33 km	stage cancelled		(Finland) Jari-Matti Latvala
1 (3-4 Sep)	SS7	11:40	Mooball 1	5.85 km	(Finland) Jari-Matti Latvala	4:41.7	(Finland) Jari-Matti Latvala
1 (3-4 Sep)	SS8	11:58	Kidney Health 1	5.74 km	(Finland) Jari-Matti Latvala	4:29.4	(Finland) Jari-Matti Latvala
1 (3-4 Sep)	SS9	12:16	Castrol Edge 1	6.85 km	(France) Sébastien Ogier	4:38.9	(Finland) Jari-Matti Latvala
1 (3-4 Sep)	SS10	14:03	Castrol Edge East 2	6.85 km	(Finland) Jari-Matti Latvala	4:29.3	(Finland) Jari-Matti Latvala
1 (3-4 Sep)	SS11	15:03	CTEK East 2	11.33 km	stage cancelled		(Finland) Jari-Matti Latvala
1 (3-4 Sep)	SS12	16:06	Mooball 2	5.85 km	(Finland) Jari-Matti Latvala	4:36.7	(Finland) Jari-Matti Latvala
1 (3-4 Sep)	SS13	16:24	Kidney Health 2	5.74 km	(Finland) Jari-Matti Latvala	4:26.0	(Finland) Jari-Matti Latvala
1 (3-4 Sep)	SS14	18:30	Tweed 3	2.55 km	(France) Sébastien Ogier	1:48.1	(Finland) Jari-Matti Latvala
1 (3-4 Sep)	SS15	18:45	Tweed 4	2.55 km	(France) Sébastien Ogier	1:46.8	(Finland) Jari-Matti Latvala
2 (5 Sep)	SS16	7:28	Dayco 1	20.31 km	(Finland) Mikko Hirvonen	9:45.1	(Finland) Jari-Matti Latvala
2 (5 Sep)	SS17	8:13	Bosch 1	18.75 km	(France) Sébastien Loeb	9:26.3	(Finland) Jari-Matti Latvala
2 (5 Sep)	SS18	9:04	Armor All 1	8.2 km	(France) Sébastien Loeb	3:47.2	(Finland) Jari-Matti Latvala
2 (5 Sep)	SS19	10:42	Urliup	5.24 km	(Finland) Mikko Hirvonen	4:25.7	(Finland) Jari-Matti Latvala
2 (5 Sep)	SS20	13:55	Armor All 2	8.2 km	(France) Sébastien Loeb	3:42.8	(Finland) Jari-Matti Latvala
2 (5 Sep)	SS21	14:34	CTEK West 1	8.59 km	(France) Sébastien Loeb	4:28.3	(France) Sébastien Loeb
2 (5 Sep)	SS22	15:27	Dayco 2	20.31 km	(France) Sébastien Loeb	9:38.3	(France) Sébastien Loeb
2 (5 Sep)	SS23	16:12	Bosch 2	18.75 km	(Spain) Dani Sordo	9:30.6	(Finland) Mikko Hirvonen
2 (5 Sep)	SS24	19:15	Tweed 5	2.55 km	(France) Sébastien Ogier	1:47.4	(Finland) Mikko Hirvonen
2 (5 Sep)	SS25	19:30	Tweed 6	2.55 km	(France) Sébastien Ogier	1:46.2	(Spain) Dani Sordo
3 (6 Sep)	SS26	7:14	Monroe 1	7.4 km	(France) Sébastien Loeb	3:25.8	(France) Sébastien Loeb
3 (6 Sep)	SS27	7:36	Castrol Edge West 1	21.52 km	(Spain) Dani Sordo	10:01.9	(France) Sébastien Loeb
3 (6 Sep)	SS28	8:37	Gondwana 1	10.88 km	(Finland) Mikko Hirvonen	6:19.0	(France) Sébastien Loeb
3 (6 Sep)	SS29	8:56	Upper Clarence 1	6.94 km	(Finland) Jari-Matti Latvala	3:14.6	(France) Sébastien Loeb
3 (6 Sep)	SS30	9:40	CTEK West 2	8.59 km	(France) Sébastien Loeb	4:27.5	(France) Sébastien Loeb
3 (6 Sep)	SS31	11:03	Monroe 2	7.4 km	(France) Sébastien Loeb	3:21.1	(France) Sébastien Loeb
3 (6 Sep)	SS32	11:25	Castrol Edge West 2	21.52 km	(Spain) Dani Sordo	9:46.9	(France) Sébastien Loeb
3 (6 Sep)	SS33	12:26	Gondwana 2	10.88 km	(France) Sébastien Loeb	6:09.1	(France) Sébastien Loeb
3 (6 Sep)	SS34	12:45	Upper Clarence 2	6.94 km	(Finland) Jari-Matti Latvala (France) Sébastien Ogier	3:12.2	(France) Sébastien Loeb
3 (6 Sep)	SS35	13:27	Repco 2	22.41 km	(Finland) Mikko Hirvonen	10:14.4	(Finland) Mikko Hirvonen

== Championship standings after the event ==
=== Drivers' championship ===
Pos	Driver	IRL (Republic of Ireland)	NOR (Norway)	CYP (Cyprus)	POR (Portugal)	ARG (Argentina)	ITA (Italy)	GRC (Greece)	POL (Poland)	FIN (Finland)	AUS (Australia)	ESP (Spain)	GBR (United Kingdom)	Pts
1	(Finland) Mikko Hirvonen	3	2	2	2	Ret	2	1	1	1	1			78
2	(France) Sébastien Loeb	1	1	1	1	1	4	Ret	7	2	2			73
3	(Spain) Dani Sordo	2	5	4	3	2	23	12	2	4	3			50
4	(Finland) Jari-Matti Latvala	14	3	12	Ret	6	1	3	Ret	3	4			36
5	(Norway) Henning Solberg	4	4	18	5	3	8	15	3	30	7			29
6	(Norway) Petter Solberg		6	3	4	Ret	3	Ret	4	Ret				25
7	(United Kingdom) Matthew Wilson	7	7	5	Ret	5	6	14	5	8	6			23
8	(France) Sébastien Ogier	6	10	Ret	17	7	Ret	2	Ret	6	5			20
9	(Argentina) Federico Villagra			7	7	4	Ret	4		11	8			15
10	(Zimbabwe) Conrad Rautenbach	18	Ret	6	Ret	Ret	9	5	8	Ret	Ret			8
11	(Norway) Mads Østberg		9		6		7	7	Ret	Ret				7
12	(United Arab Emirates) Khalid al-Qassimi	8		8	8		16	6		9	19			6
13	(Russia) Evgeny Novikov		12	Ret	Ret		5	16	9	Ret				4
14	(Australia) Chris Atkinson	5												4
15	(Finland) Matti Rantanen									5				4
16	(Poland) Krzysztof Hołowczyc								6					3
17	(Finland) Jari Ketomaa									7				2
18	(Qatar) Nasser Al-Attiyah			11	16	8	10	EX						1
19	(Estonia) Urmo Aava	10	8							29				1
20	(Greece) Lambros Athanassoulas							8						1
Pos	Driver	IRL (Republic of Ireland)	NOR (Norway)	CYP (Cyprus)	POR (Portugal)	ARG (Argentina)	ITA (Italy)	GRC (Greece)	POL (Poland)	FIN (Finland)	AUS (Australia)	ESP (Spain)	GBR (United Kingdom)	Pts

Key
Colour	Result
Gold	Winner
Silver	2nd place
Bronze	3rd place
Green	Points finish
Blue	Non-points finish
Blue	Non-classified finish (NC)
Purple	Did not finish (Ret)
Black	Excluded (EX)
Black	Disqualified (DSQ)
White	Did not start (DNS)
White	Cancelled (C)
Blank	Withdrew entry from the event (WD)

=== Manufacturers' championship ===
Pos	Team	Event												Total points
Pos	Team	IRL (Republic of Ireland)	NOR (Norway)	CYP (Cyprus)	POR (Portugal)	ARG (Argentina)	ITA (Italy)	GRC (Greece)	POL (Poland)	FIN (Finland)	AUS (Australia)	ESP (Spain)	GBR (United Kingdom)	Total points
1	(France) Citroën Total World Rally Team	18	14	16	16	18	8	4	12	13	14			133
2	(United States) BP Ford World Rally Team	8	14	10	8	3	18	18	10	16	15			120
3	(United Kingdom) Stobart M-Sport Ford Rally Team	8	8	6	5	10	7	5	11	4	5			69
4	(France) Citroën Junior Team	5	2	4	0	2	5	6	5	4	4			37
5	(Argentina) Munchi's Ford World Rally Team	0	0	3	4	5	0	6	0	2	1			21
