= Urvo Männama =

Estonia rally driver

Personal information
- Nationality: (Estonia) Estonian
- Born: 6 August 1988 (age 38) Estonia
- Height: 185 cm (6 ft 1 in)
- Weight: 97 kg (214 lb)
- Spouse: Kristin Männama

Sport
- Country: Estonia
- Sport: Rally raid
- Team: Overdrive Racing

Urvo Männama (born 6 August 1988) is an Estonian rally and rally raid driver.

== Achievements ==
- 2022 - Rally Greece Offroad: 2nd in T1 class.
- 2024 - MudEST Rally Raid: 1st place overall.
- 2025 - Dakar Rally: 12th place

== Career ==
Urvo Männama made his debut at 2023 Dakar Rally codriven by his cousin Risto Lepik. They raced a Toyota Gazoo Racing Hilux. On stage 11 they rolled the car and later in the stage their gearbox broke which left them stranded in the middle of the desert. Since they ran out of time to make it to the stage finish they were forced to retire from the rally.

For the 2024 Dakar Rally they switched their Toyota Hilux for a brand new Century Racing CR7. Because the new car was untested and with many faults, the technical problems begin already at the start. The rally ended for them before the start of the eight stage when the team mechanics took the car for a test drive after service. Due to an unknown malfunction the car caught fire and burnt down in seconds, fortunately nobody was hurt.

In the 2025 Dakar Rally their aim was a TOP 20 finish. They showed good pace and finished stages with competitive times. Avoiding bigger mistakes and issues, they finished the rally in 13th place. With that result they are the only Estonian crew who have ever finished the Dakar Rally in the Ultimate class. Their final position was later changed to 12th after a competitor was disqualified.

In 2026, it was announced that Männama will partner up with Kuldar Sikk and they will start in the 2026 Rallye du Maroc to test for the upcoming Dakar Rally. They finished the rally in 17th place.

== Dakar results ==
| Year | Class | Vehicle | Position | Stages won |
|---|---|---|---|---|
| 2023 | Car | (Japan) Toyota | DNF | 0 |
| 2024 | Car | (South Africa) Century | DNF | 0 |
| 2025 | Car | (Japan) Toyota | 12th | 0 |
