= Mooball, New South Wales =

Town in New South Wales, Australia

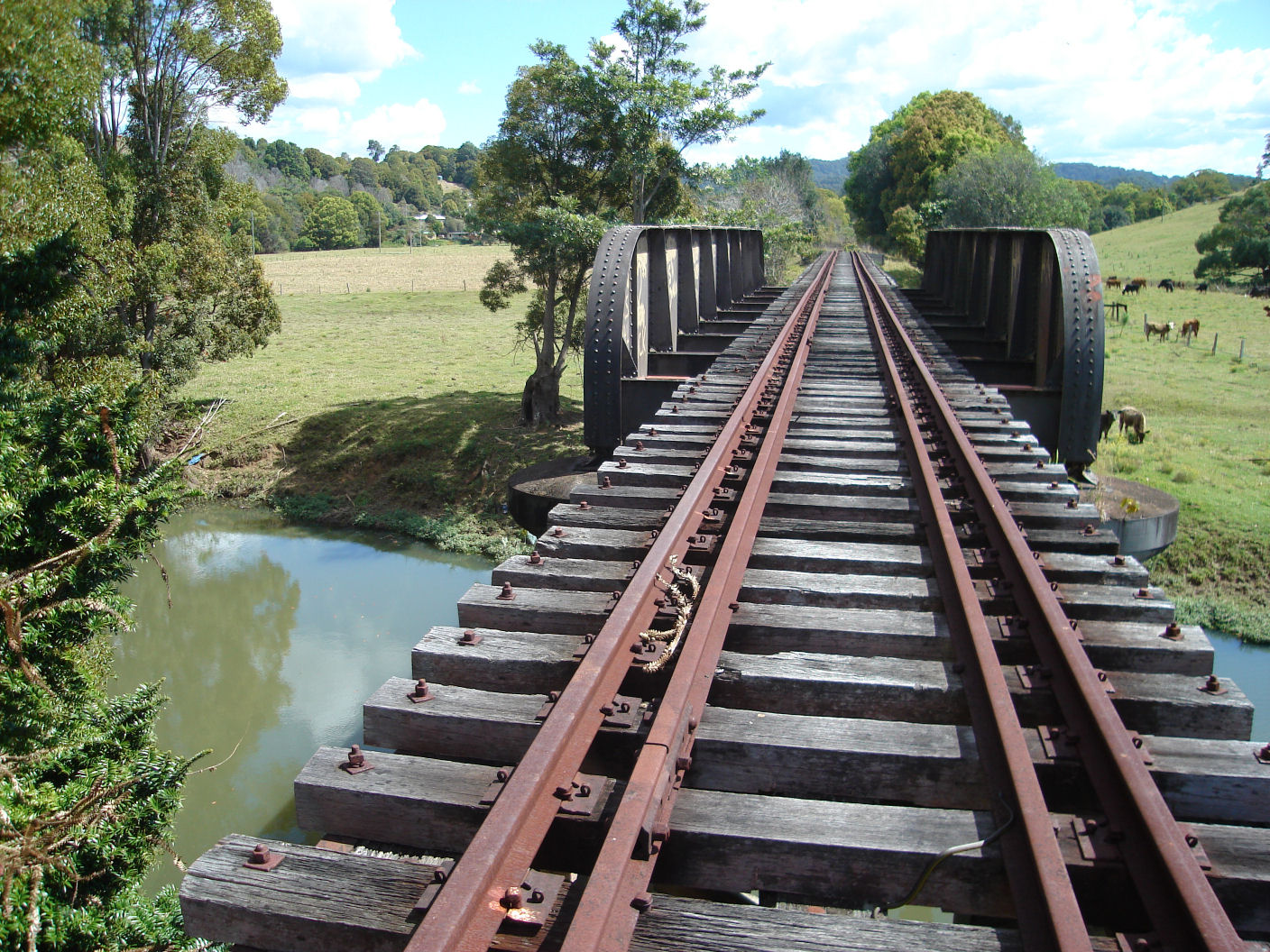
Abandoned Railway Bridge Mooball, 2008

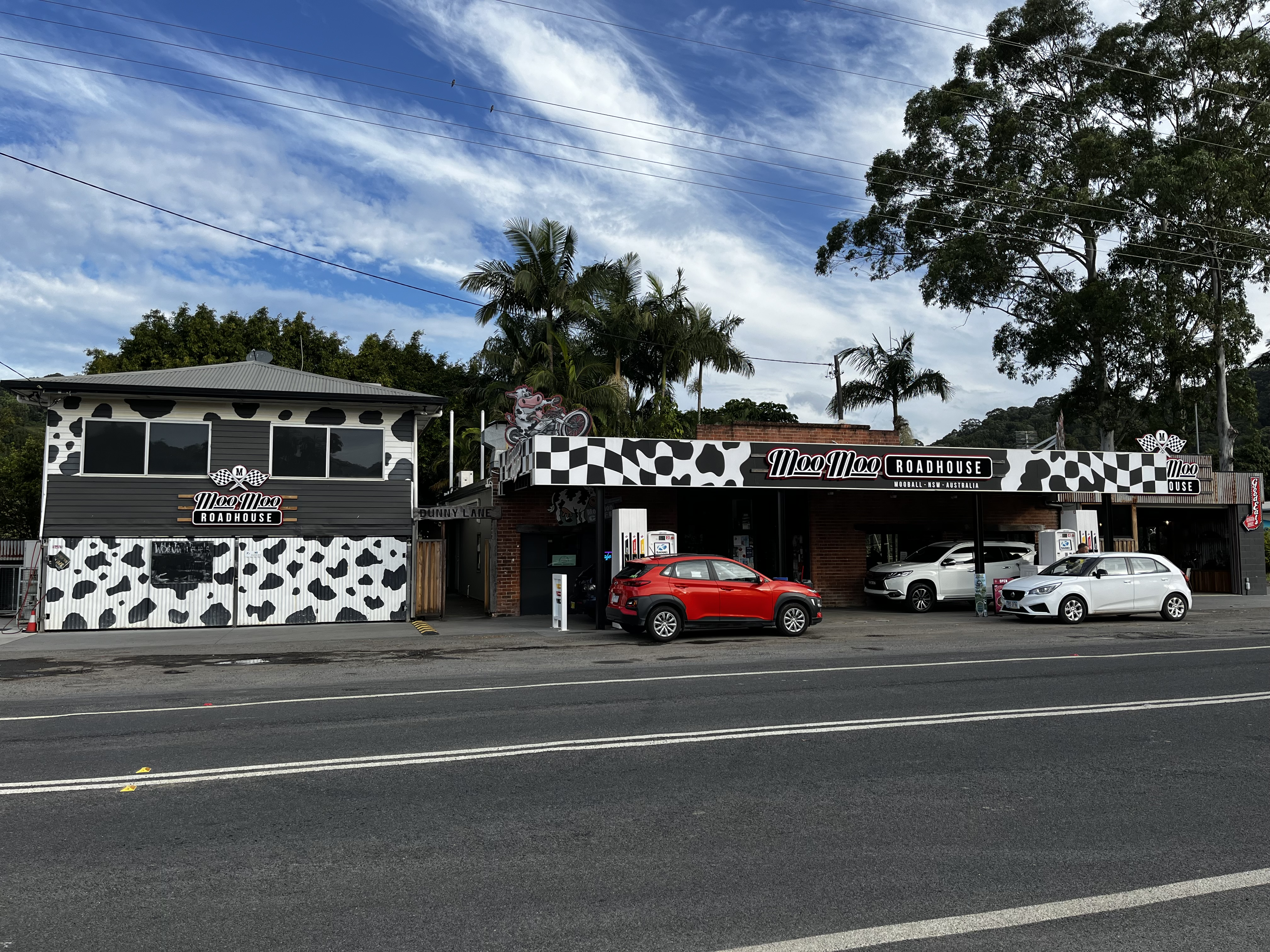
The Moo Moo Roadhouse in Mooball, NSW, 2024

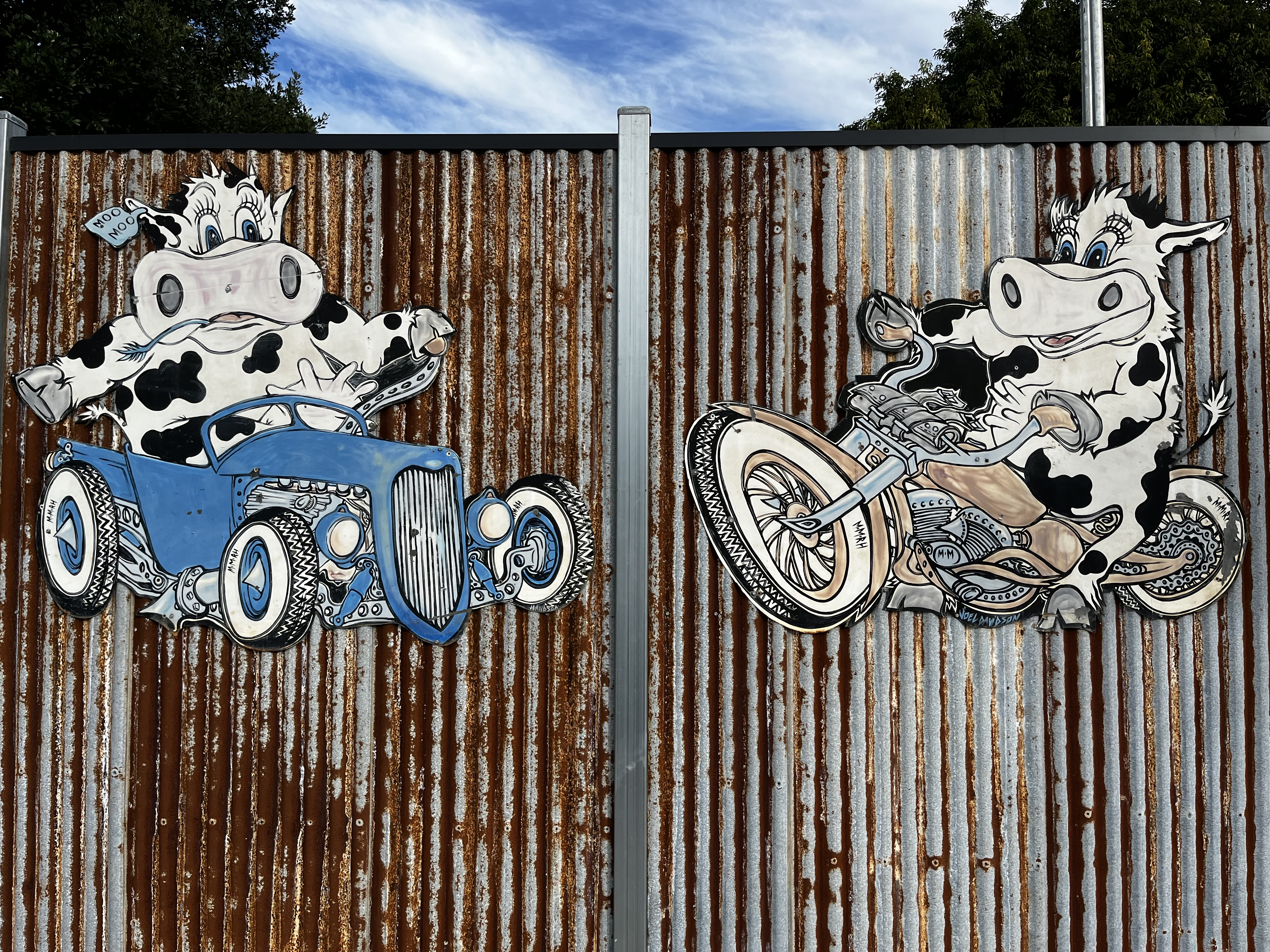
Cow themed artwork at the Moo Moo Roadhouse, 2024

Mooball (pronounced mow-ball) is a locality in the Tweed Shire, New South Wales, Australia and it is on the lands of the Bundjalung people who are its traditional owners. The town name was originally spelt Moball.

The Northern Rivers Rail Trail passes through the town and it is nearby to the Mooball National Park.

== History ==
The name of the town is from the Bandjalung-Yugambeh dialect chain word "mobool", for which there are various translations including that it means lawyer vine, lake, lagoon or big swamp or, as bowels.

In March 2012, Mooball was declared free of plastic bags.

In 2016, an unusually high number of cancer cases in residents of Mooball raised concerns about whether there were radioactive elements introduced through a local sand mining business.

Thanks to its rural setting, Mooball is a popular tourist destination due to the cow themed decorations throughout the town; these decorations include black and white cow prints painted on electricity poles throughout. Other cow themed attractions available include the Moo Moo Roadhouse, which features cow style markings and artwork.

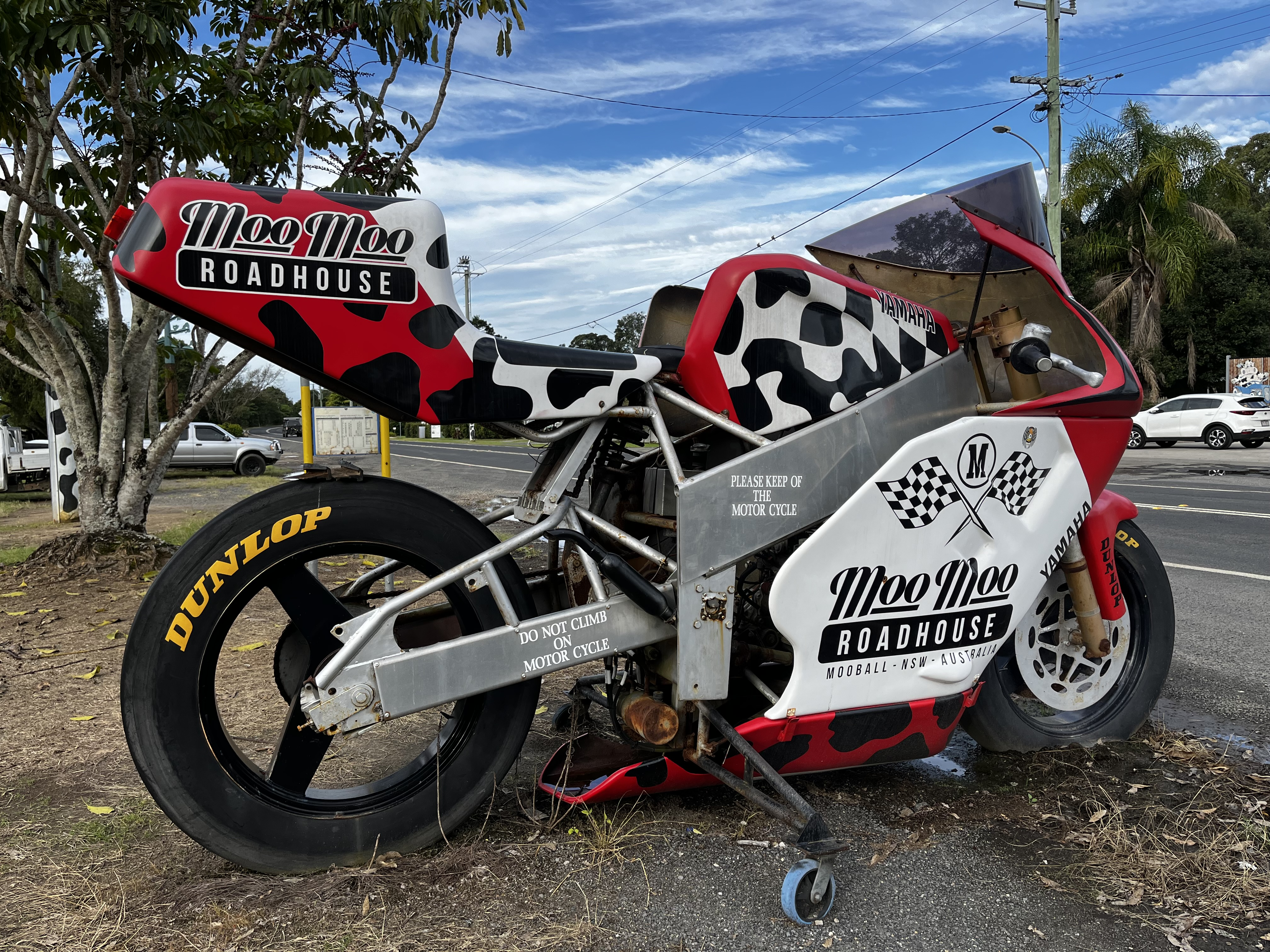
The big motorcycle at Mooball, New South Wales, 2024

== The Big Motorcycle ==
Mooball is home to the Big Motorcycle, one of Australia's big things, and this is across the road from the Moo Moo Roadhouse on Tweed Valley Way. The Big Motorcycle is a replica of the Yamaha YZR500 ridden by Wayne Rainey in 1993. It is three times the size of a regular motorbike and stands three metres tall.
