= Suzuki Ignis =

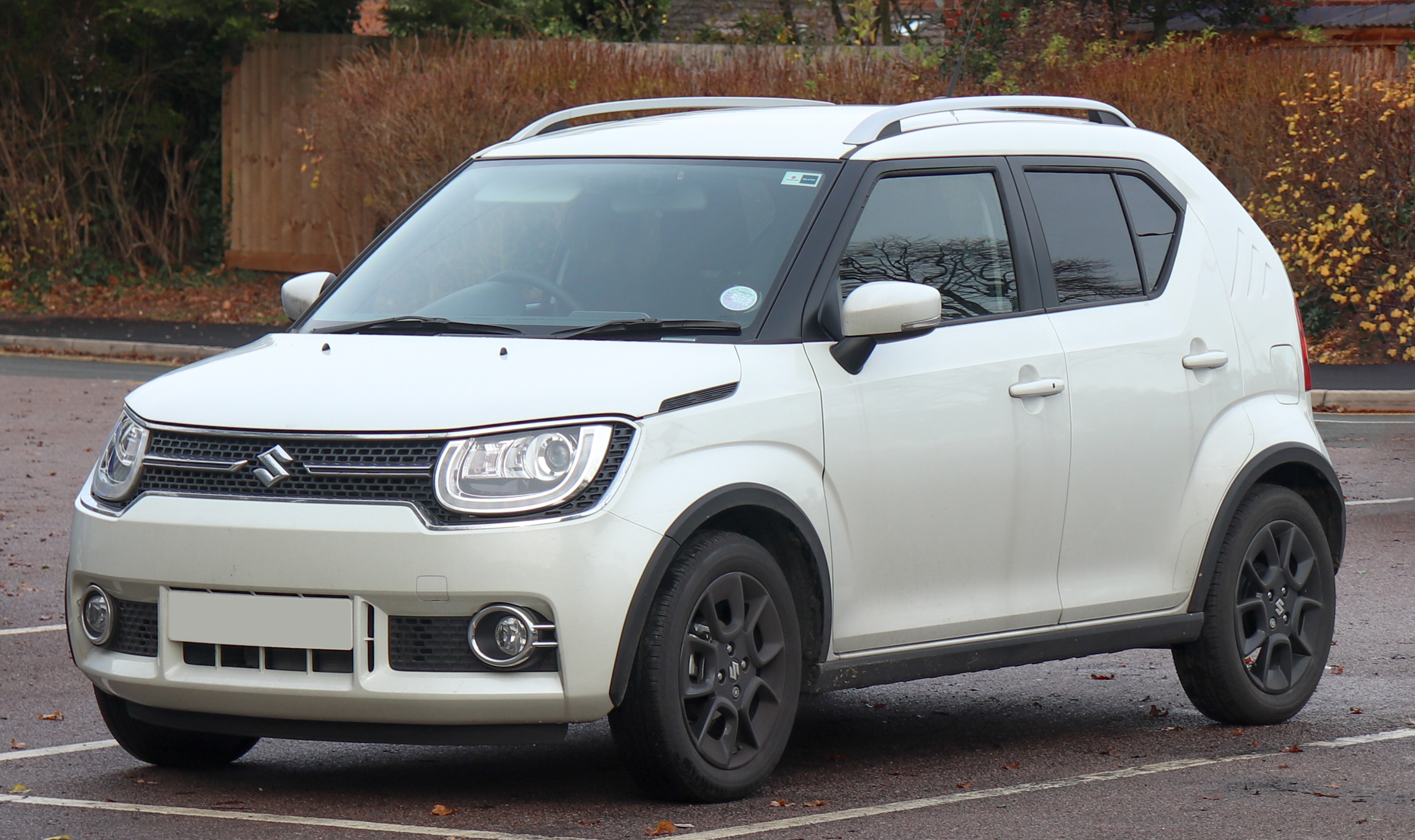
- 2018 Suzuki Ignis SZ5 (UK)

Overview
- Manufacturer: Suzuki
- Production: 2000–2008; 2016–2026

Body and chassis
- Class: Subcompact car (B-segment) (2000–2006); Crossover city car (A-segment) (2016–2026)
- Layout: Front-engine, front-wheel-drive or four-wheel-drive

The Suzuki Ignis (Japanese: スズキ・イグニス, Hepburn: Suzuki Igunisu) was an automobile nameplate that was first produced by Suzuki in 2000 as a subcompact car, replacing the Suzuki Cultus, and subsequently as a crossover-styled city car from 2016 to 2026.

The Cultus retailed under various names globally, notably as the Suzuki Swift. While the Cultus-based Swift was replaced by the Ignis in Europe and Australasia, Japanese models were in fact badged Suzuki Swift—thus debuting the "Swift" name in that market. The word "ignis" is Latin for "fire".

As a result of a venture project between General Motors (GM) and Suzuki, the Ignis, from 2001 also formed the basis of the Chevrolet Cruze. The Cruze sold throughout Japan as a Chevrolet, with Australasian-market versions badged Holden Cruze. From 2003, Suzuki of Europe adopted a lengthened version of the Cruze as the Suzuki Ignis—representing a facelift of the original Ignis. In the same year, Subaru adopted the car as the Subaru G3X Justy, also exclusive to Europe.

== First generation (FH/MH; 2000) ==
=== First series (FH; 2000) ===
First series
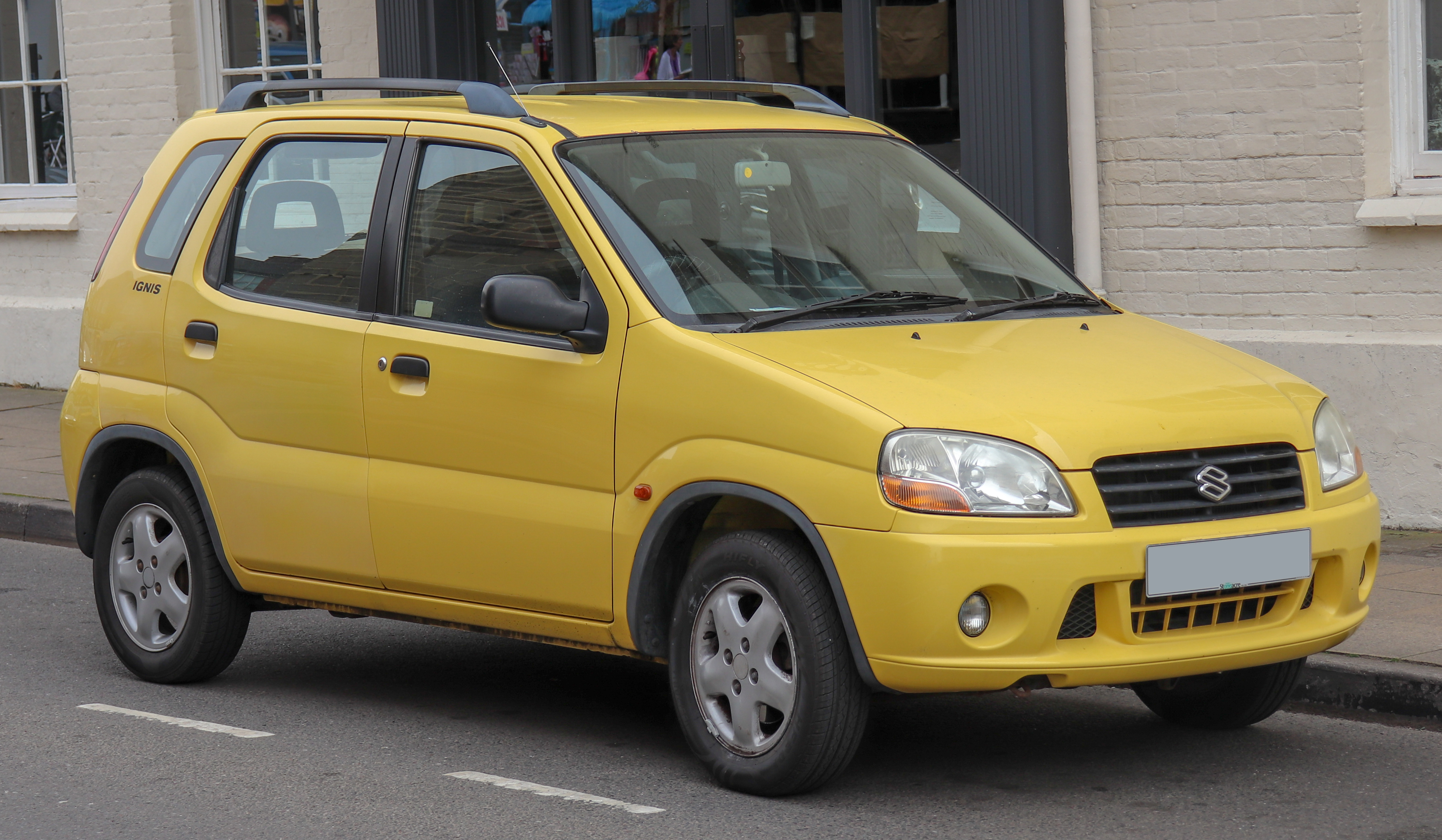
- 2000–2003 Suzuki Ignis GL 5-door (UK)

Overview
- Model code: FH
- Also called: Suzuki Swift (Japan)
- Production: 2000–2008
- Assembly: Japan: Kosai, Shizuoka
- Designer: Hiroshi Tsuburai (Ignis Sport)

Body and chassis
- Body style: 3/5-door hatchback
- Related: Suzuki Kei

Powertrain
- Engine: Petrol: 1.3 L M13A I4; 1.5 L M15A I4
- Transmission: 4-speed automatic; 5-speed manual

Dimensions
- Wheelbase: 2,360 mm (92.9 in)
- Length: 3,615 mm (142.3 in)
- Width: 1,595 mm (62.8 in); 1,650 mm (65.0 in) (Sport)
- Height: 3-door: 1,540 mm (60.6 in); 5-door: 1,585 mm (62.4 in); 1,520 mm (59.8 in) (Sport)
- Kerb weight: 880–960 kg (1,940.1–2,116.4 lb)

Chronology
- Predecessor: Suzuki Swift/Cultus hatchback
- Successor: Suzuki Swift (international)

The first series of the Ignis (codenamed HT51S and HT81S) was manufactured as a three- and five-door hatchback, powered by Suzuki's new generation of inline-four petrol engines, the M family. This family featured DOHC, four valves per cylinder and variable valve timing. Engines were offered in two displacements: 1.3 litres (M13A) and 1.5 litres (M15A), with power outputs of 65 kW (88 PS; 87 hp) (JIS) and 81 kW (110 PS; 109 hp) (JIS), respectively. Suzuki assigned the HT51S model code to the 1.3-liter model, with the 1.5-liter versions allocated the HT81S code. With exception of the Ignis Sport, Suzuki did not offer the three-door model in Japan. Likewise, the 1.5-liter engine was unavailable outside of the Ignis Sport range in export markets, with the 1.3-litre version offered being detuned to 61 kW (83 PS; 82 hp). The standard transmission was a five-speed manual, with a four-speed automatic transmission optional. Both the front- and all-wheel drive layouts were tendered, although the combination of four-wheel drive and automatic transmission combination was limited to Japan as it was incompatible with European emission standards. A minor facelift came in 2003, featuring new wheel trims, a revised grille insert and clear headlamp-mounted turn signal lenses, as opposed to the amber versions fitted to the original. Production ended in 2006.

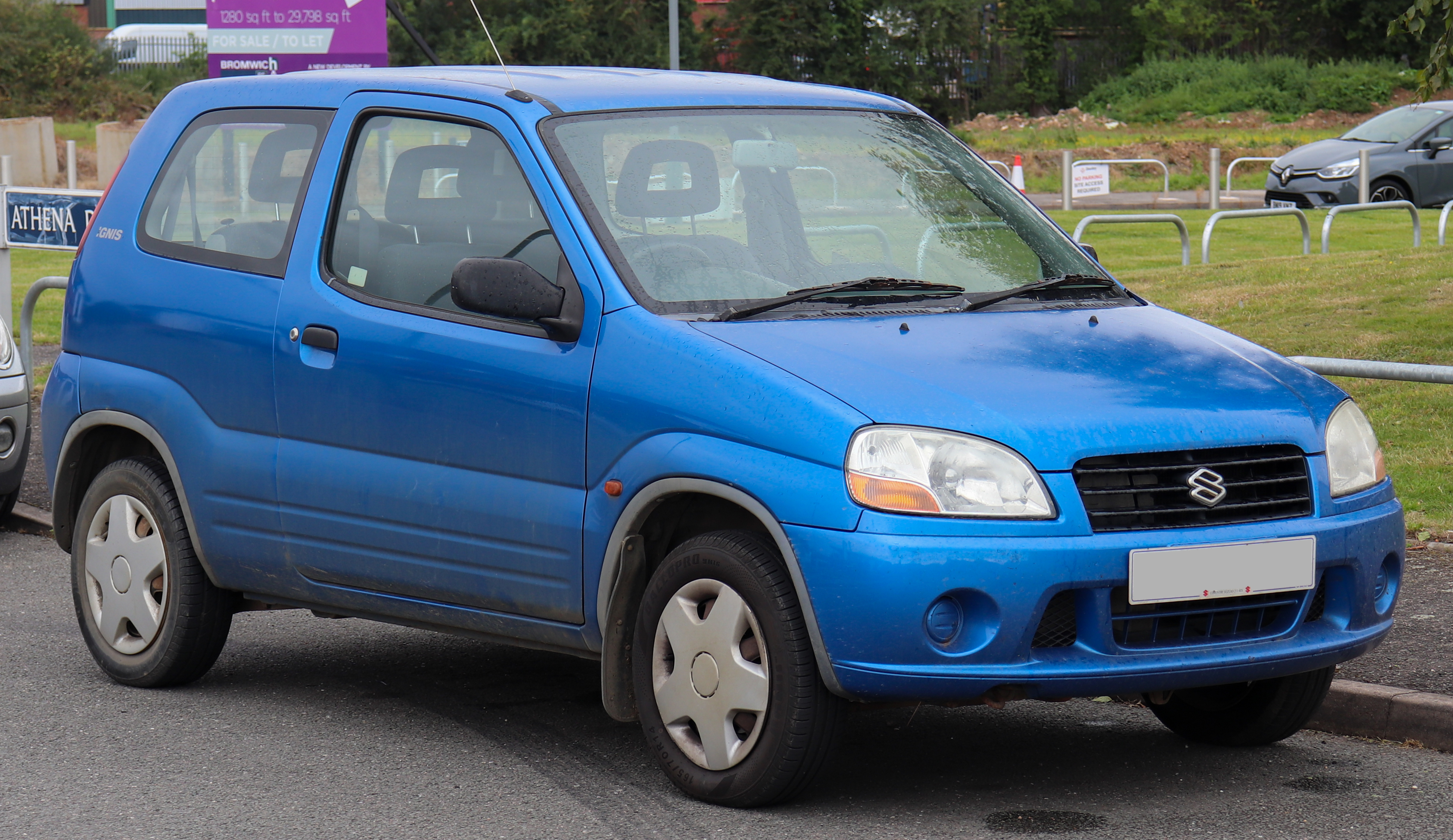
2000–2003 Suzuki Ignis GL 3-door (UK)

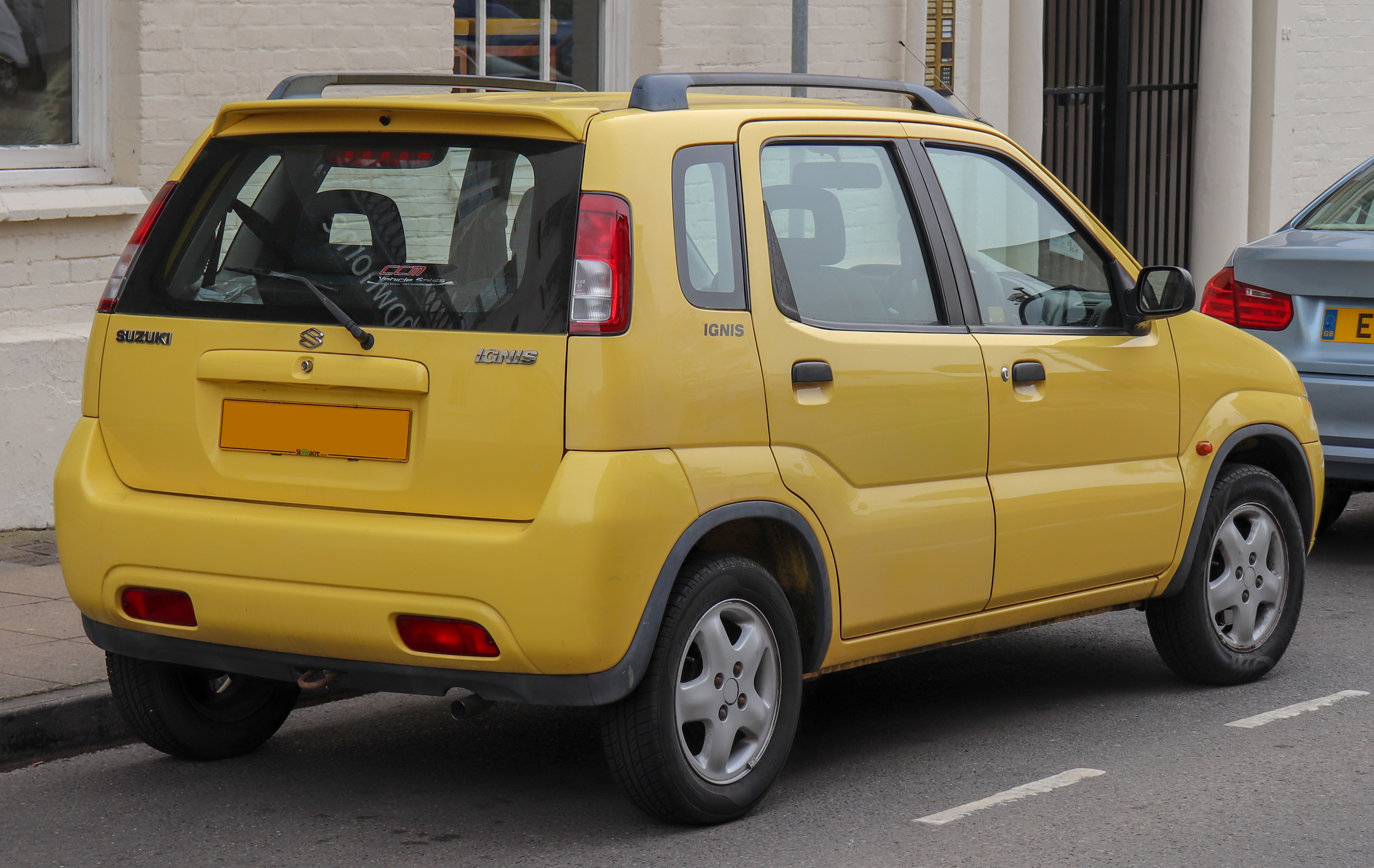
2000–2003 Suzuki Ignis GL 5-door (UK)

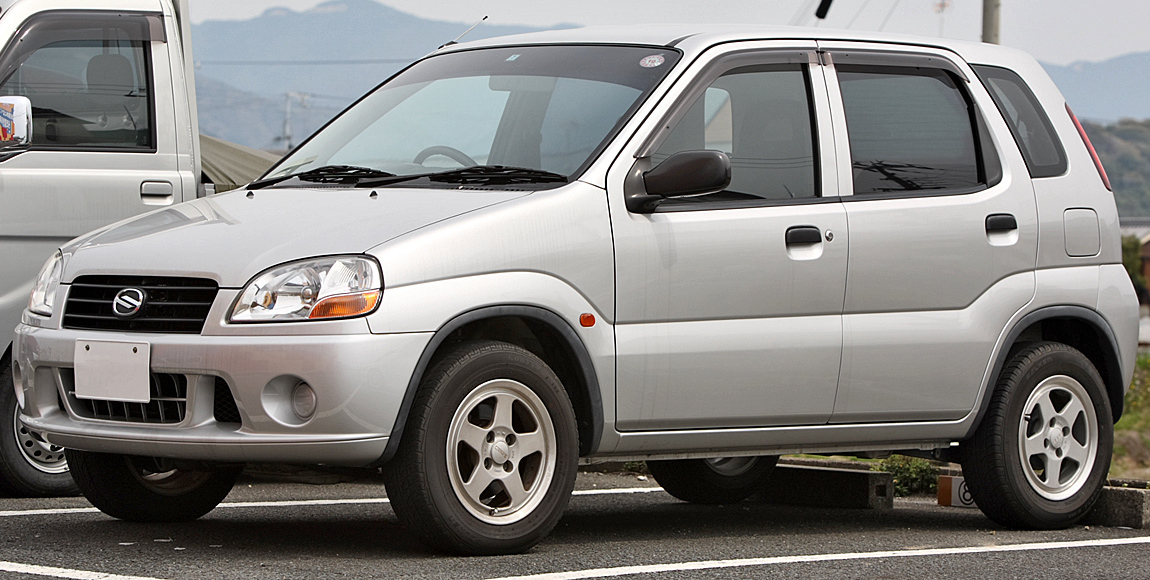
2000–2003 Suzuki Swift 5-door (Japan)

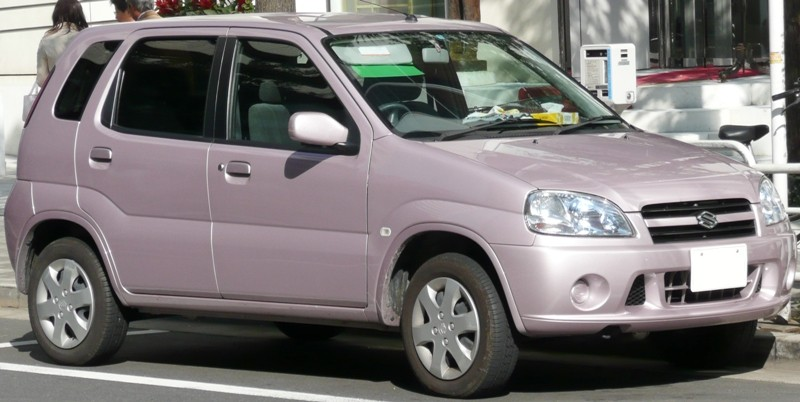
2003–2006 Suzuki Swift 5-door (Japan)

==== Sport ====
Following its use in the 2002 World Rally Championship season, Suzuki introduced the Ignis Sport in 2003, a performance-oriented version based on the three-door body style. Badged the "Swift Sport" in Japan, the performance model utilised the same 1.5-litre engine as the regular car, but with power increased to 85 kW (116 PS; 114 hp). The engine was slightly detuned for the European market, to 80 kW (109 PS; 107 hp). The car featured a number of modifications, including a body kit, lowered and firmer suspension, close ratio gear box and tuned exhaust. The Sport has the roof bars removed which were standard on the normal Ignis. Recaro sport seats are included in the cabin, white instrument dials with blue illumination and carbon effect panels to increase its sporty appeal. The Ignis Sport can accelerate from 0–100 km/h (62 mph) in 8.9 seconds and has a top speed of 185 km/h (115 mph). The Sport ceased production in 2005. It was only available in a limited selection of colours: red, blue, silver, black and yellow. Various optional extras were available including metallic pedals, driving lights in the bumper and front mesh grille.

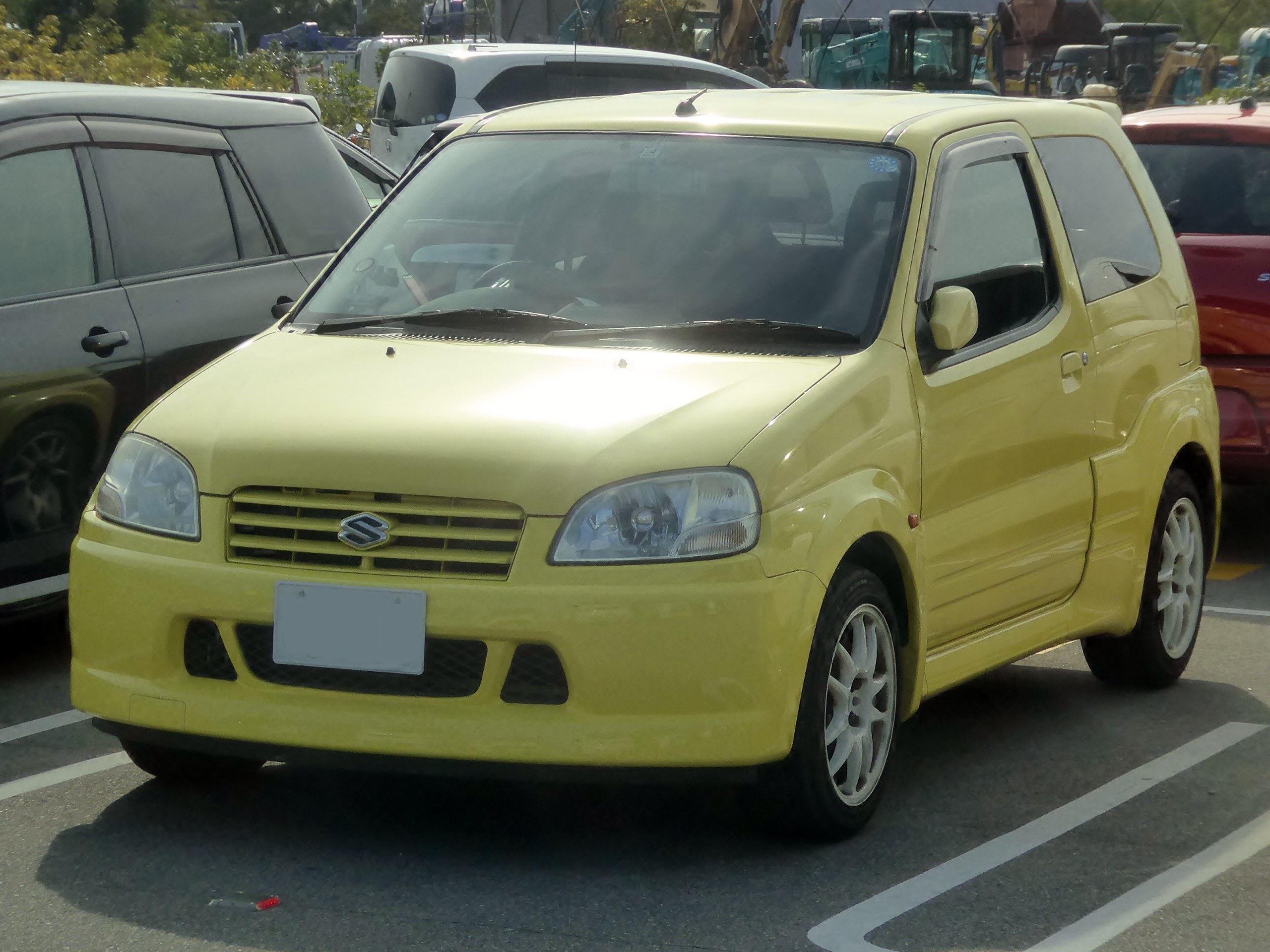
2003 Suzuki Swift Sport 3-door

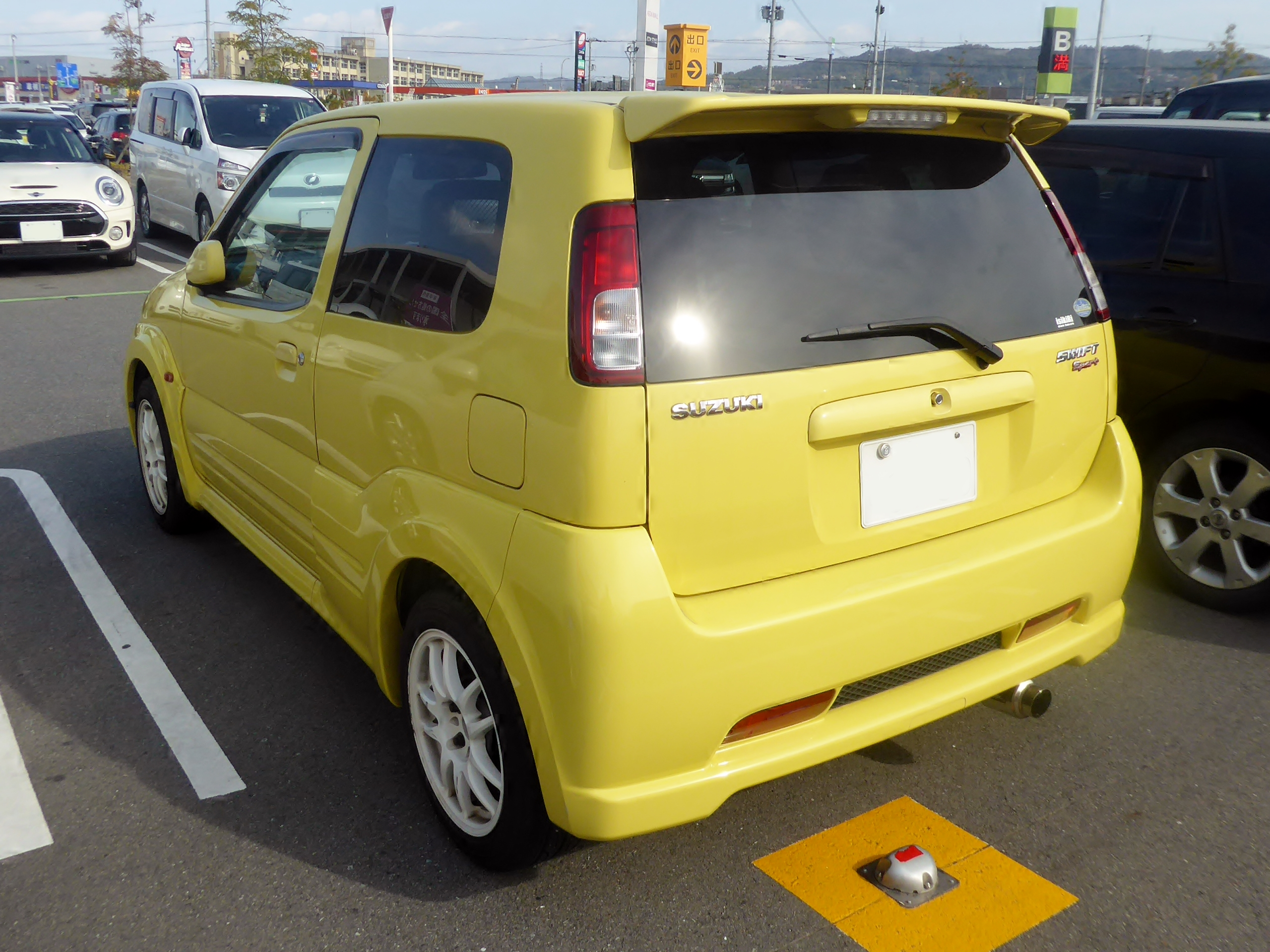
2003 Suzuki Swift Sport 3-door

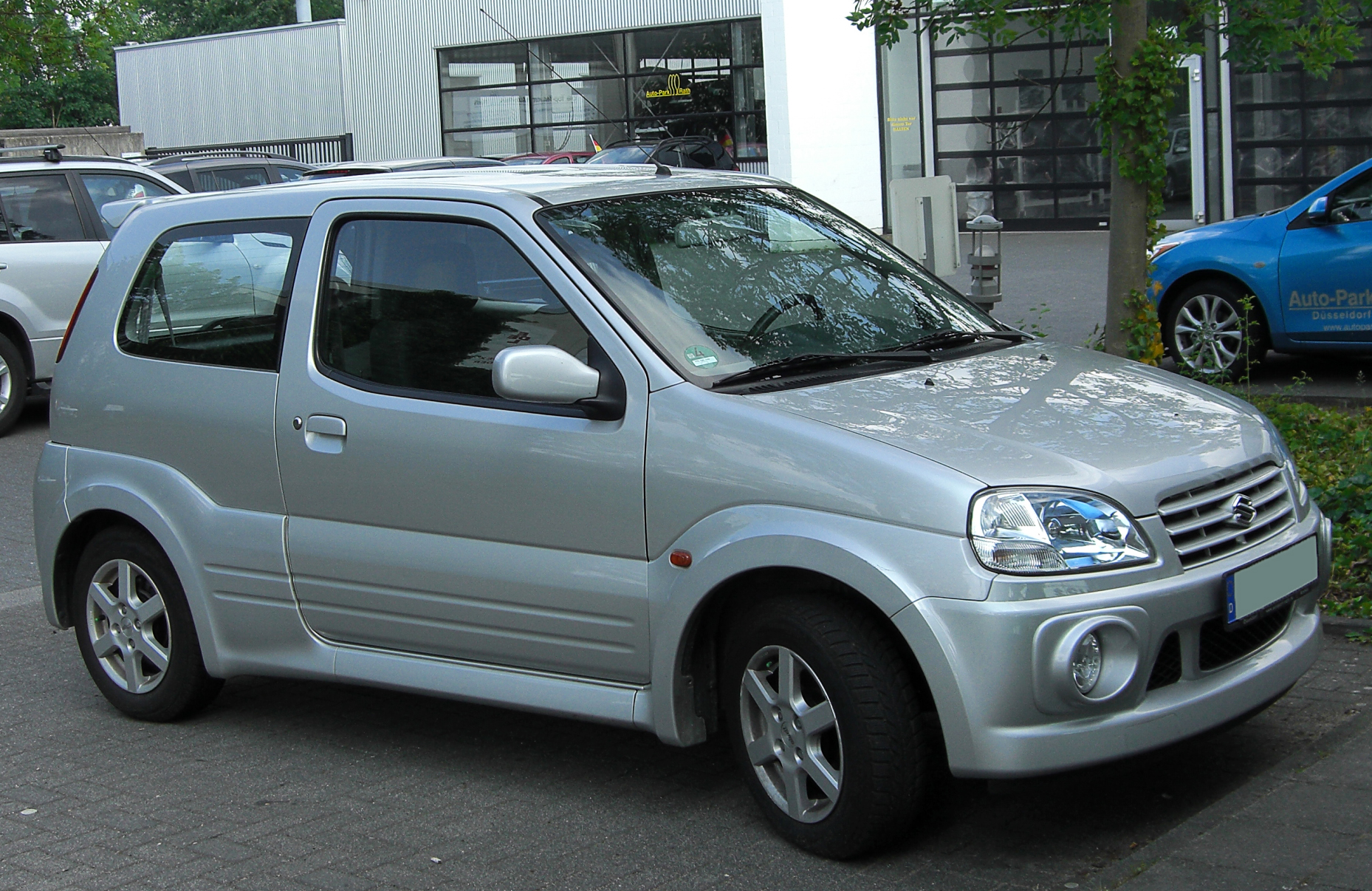
2003–2005 Suzuki Ignis Sport 3-door

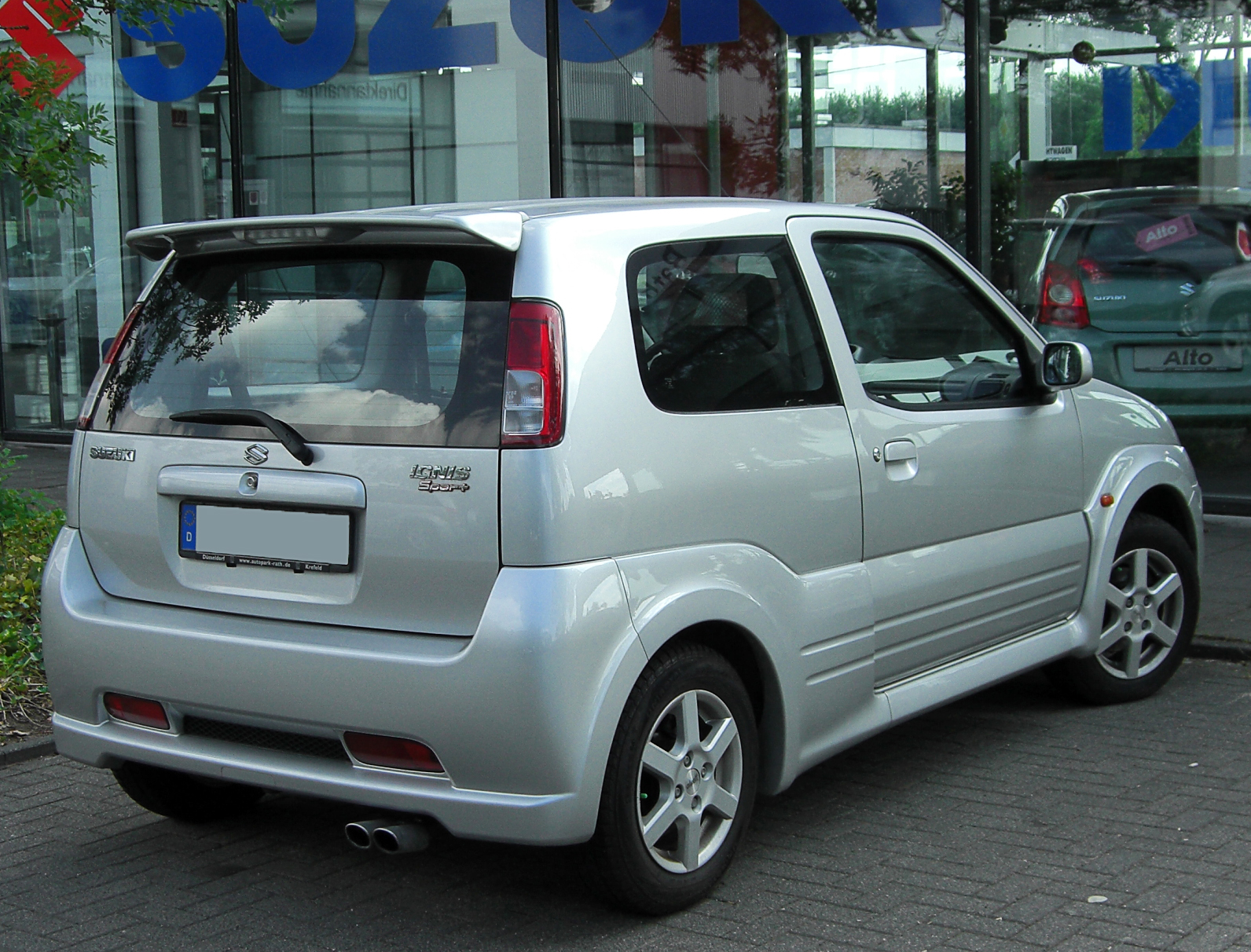
2003–2005 Suzuki Ignis Sport 3-door

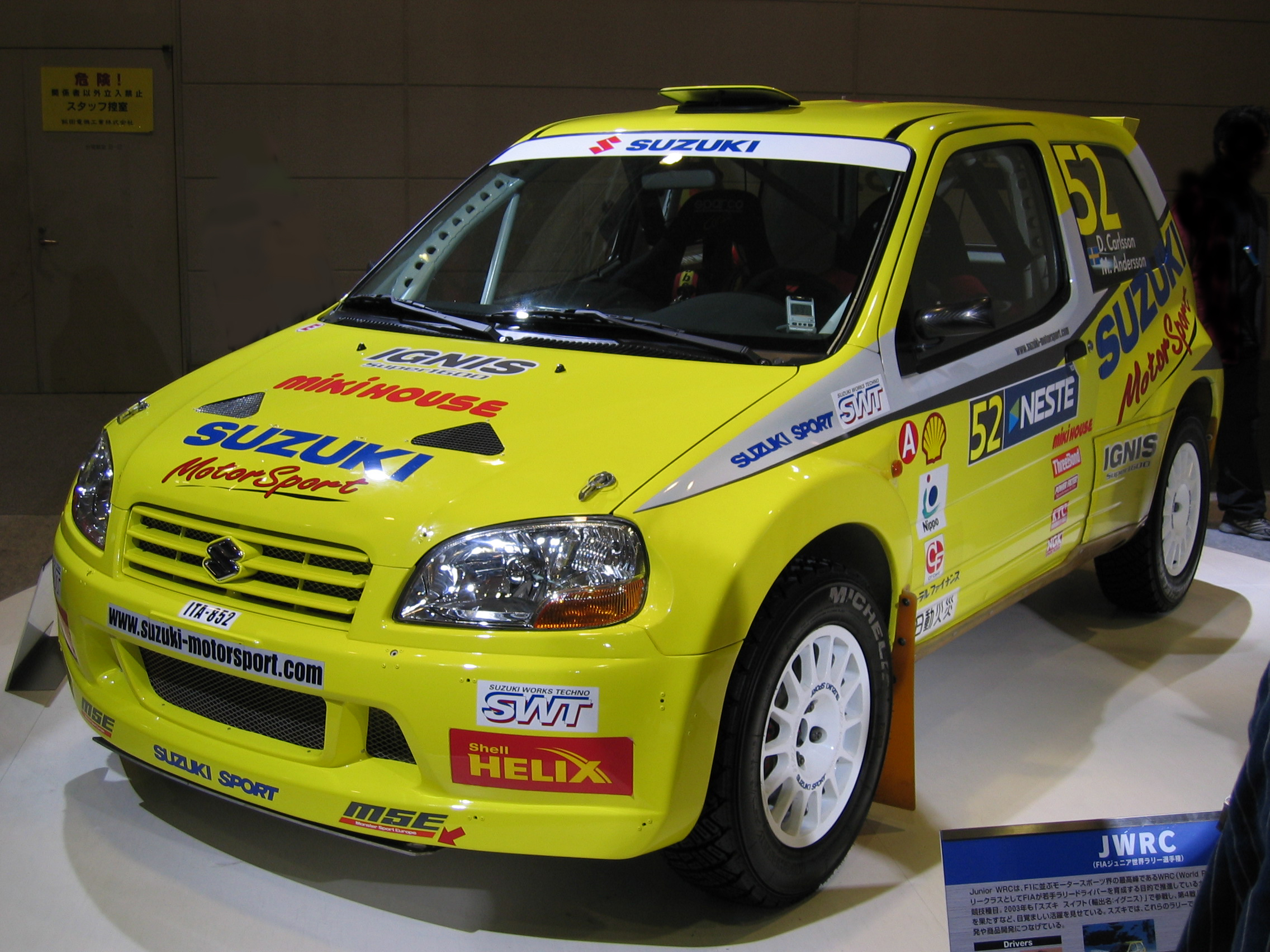
Suzuki Ignis Sport S1600 rally car

=== Second series (MH; 2001) ===
==== Chevrolet Cruze ====
Second series
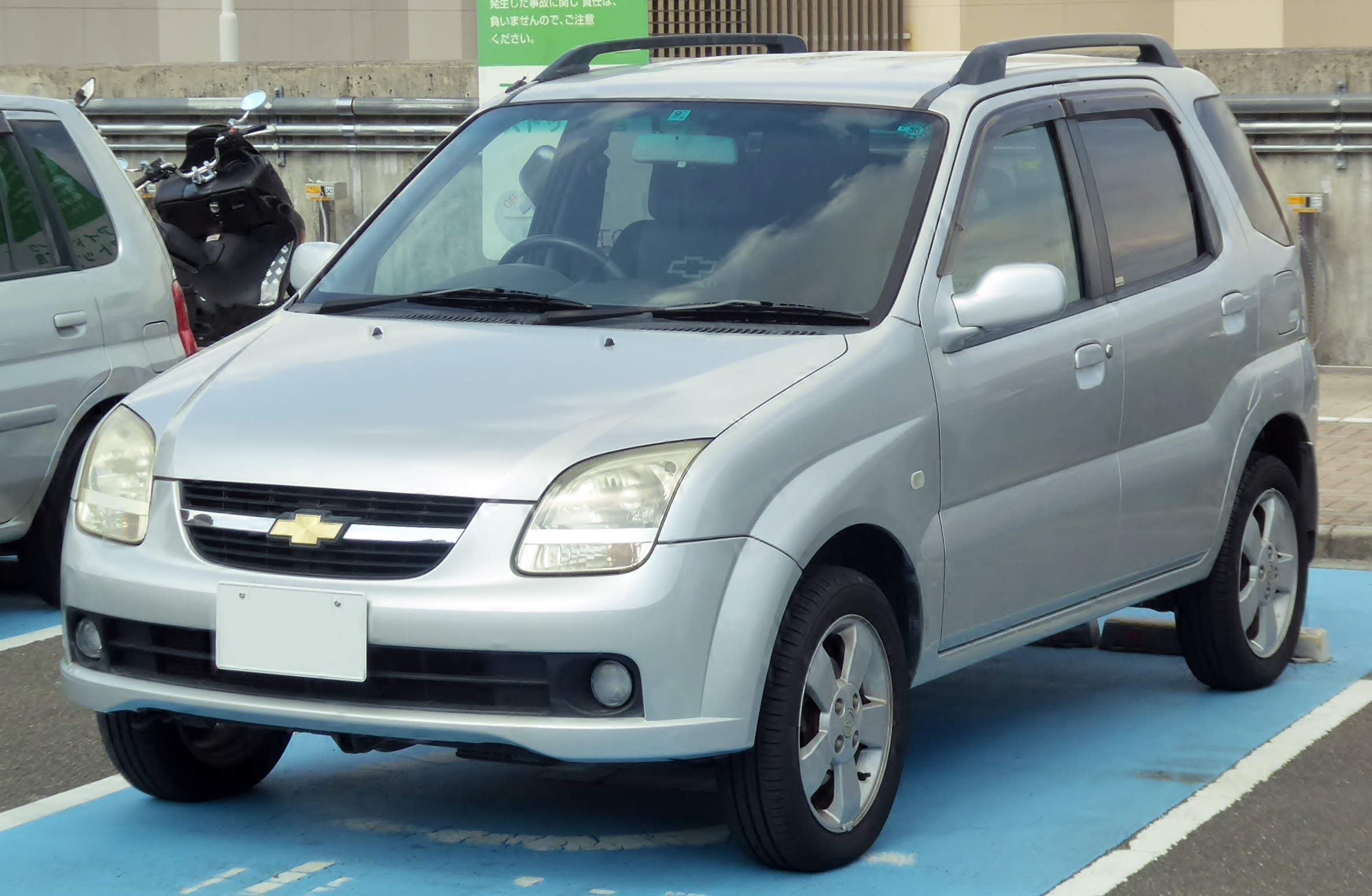
- Chevrolet Cruze 1.3 LS (Japan)

Overview
- Model code: MH
- Also called: Chevrolet Cruze (Japan/New Zealand); Holden Cruze (Australia); Subaru Justy (Europe)
- Production: 2001–2008 (Chevrolet); 2003–2008 (Suzuki)
- Assembly: Japan: Kosai, Shizuoka (Chevrolet/Holden Cruze); Hungary: Esztergom (Suzuki Ignis/Subaru Justy)

Body and chassis
- Class: Subcompact car (B-segment)
- Body style: 5-door hatchback
- Related: Suzuki Kei

Powertrain
- Engine: Petrol: 1.3 L M13A I4; 1.5 L M15A I4; Diesel: 1.3 L D13A DDiS I4 turbo-diesel
- Transmission: 4-speed automatic; 5-speed manual

Dimensions
- Wheelbase: 2,360 mm (92.9 in)
- Length: Chevrolet: 3,625 mm (142.7 in); Suzuki: 3,770 mm (148.4 in)
- Width: 1,640 mm (64.6 in)
- Height: 1,565–1,610 mm (61.6–63.4 in)
- Kerb weight: 940–990 kg (2,072.3–2,182.6 lb)

Chronology
- Predecessor: Holden Drover; Subaru Justy (second generation; Europe)
- Successor: Holden Trax (Australia/New Zealand); Subaru Justy (fourth generation; Europe); Suzuki Swift (integrated)

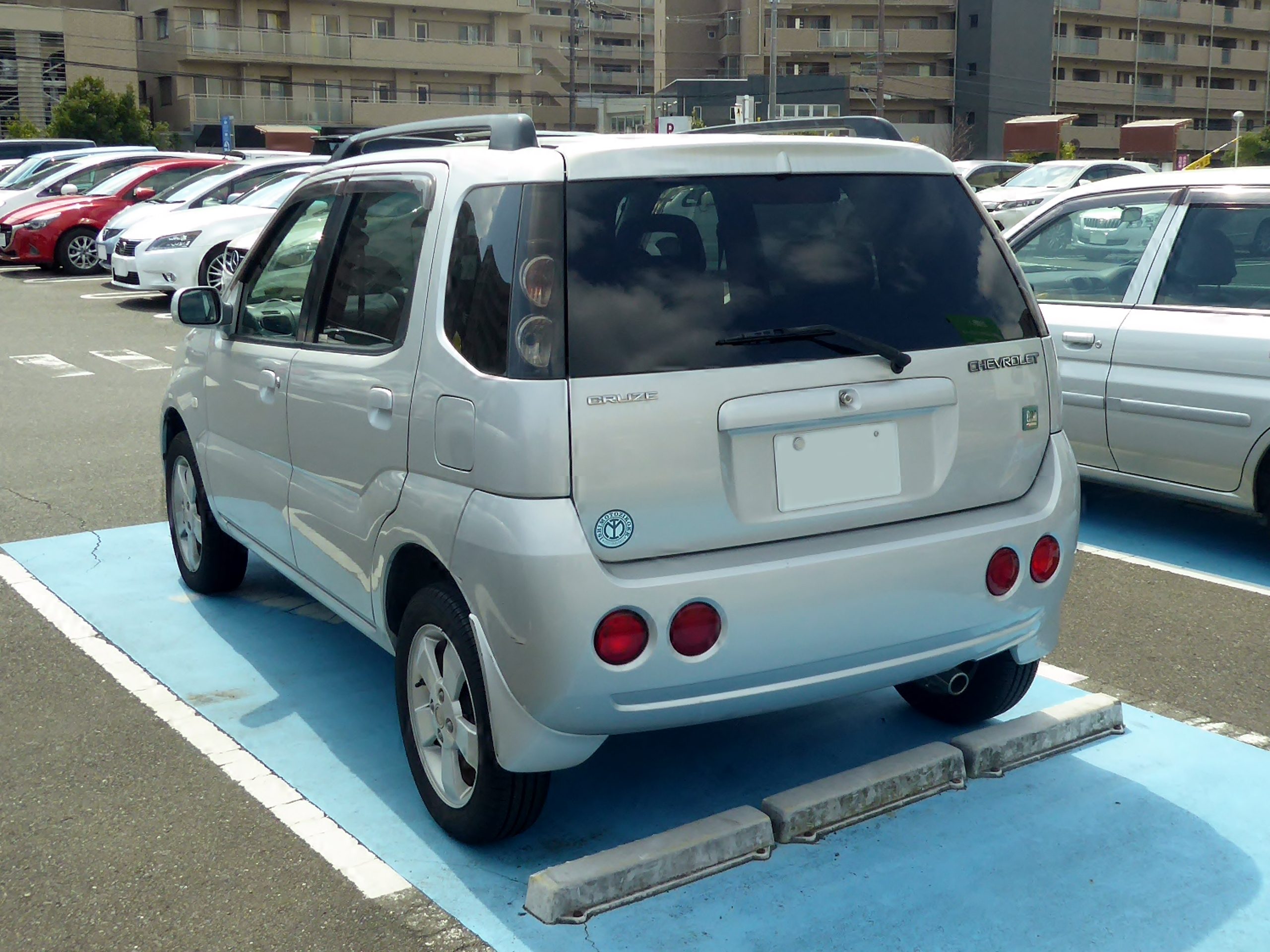
Chevrolet Cruze 1.3 LS (Japan)

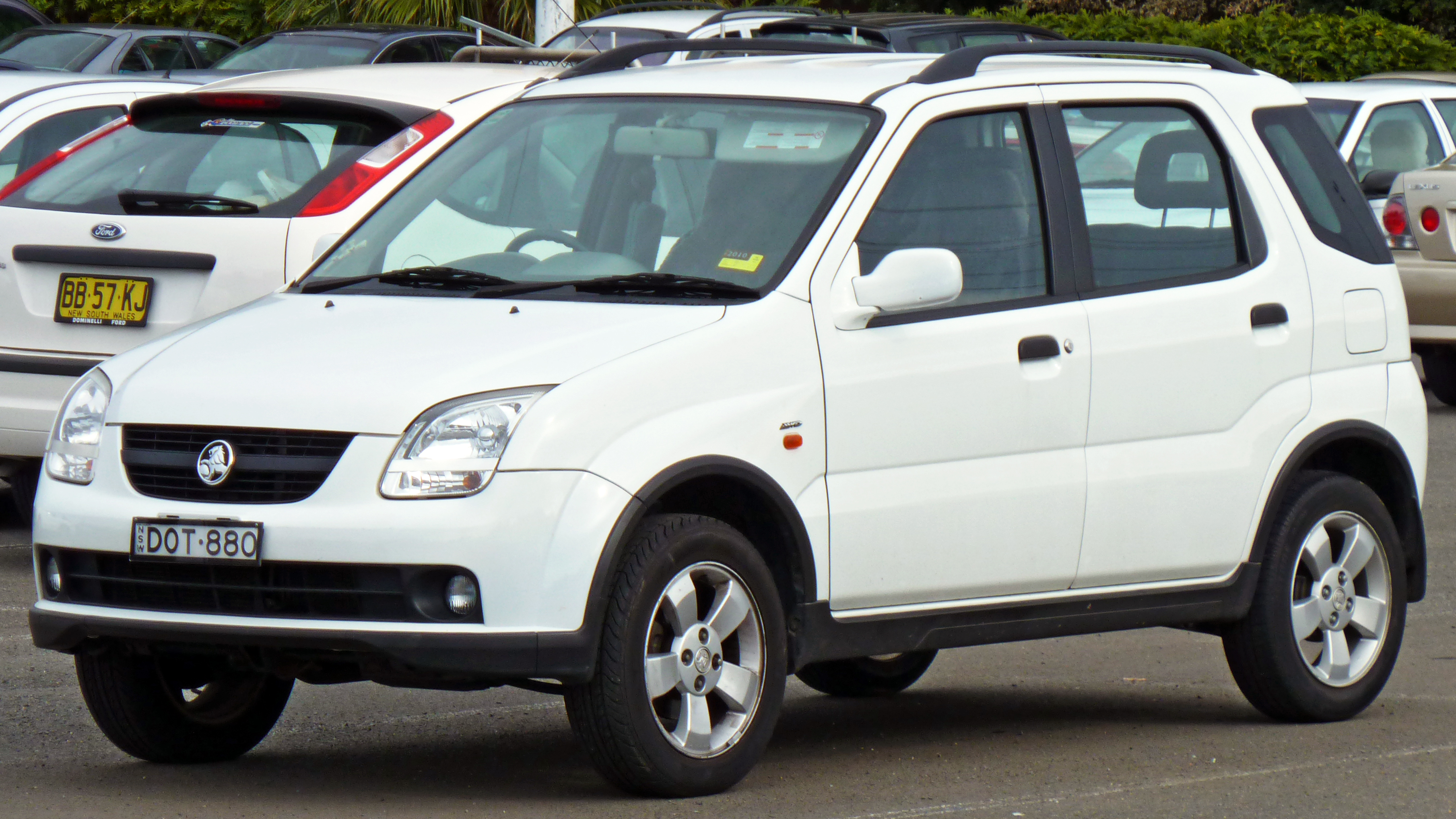

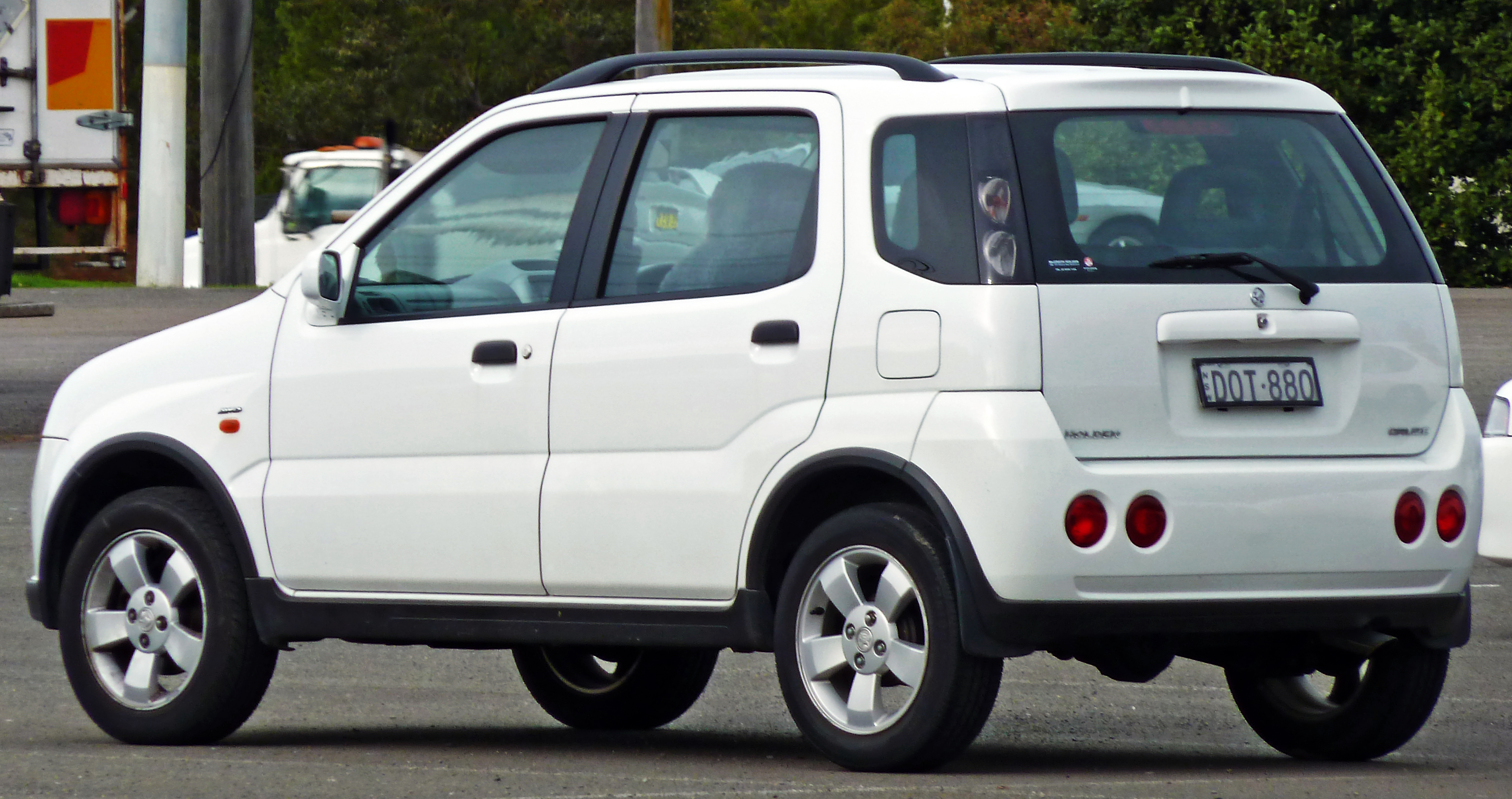
2002–2006 Holden Cruze (YG)

Revealed as the Chevrolet YGM1 concept car at the 33rd Tokyo Motor Show in 1999, the Chevrolet Cruze (codenamed HR51S and HR81S) derived from the Suzuki Ignis. The development of the Cruze departed from the original five-door hatchback Suzuki as a sport utility vehicle (SUV). Despite the Chevrolet branding, the YGM1, like the production car, was the work of GM's Australian arm, Holden. The YGM1 design team were given just 12 weeks to conceive the concept, styled by Peter Hughes under the direction of Holden's then chief designer, Michael Simcoe. The revamped interior was done under the direction of Jenny Morgan-Douralis, Holden's chief colour and trim designer at the time. Along with the styling, Holden also executed most of the engineering work and were responsible for devising the "Cruze" nameplate.

GM revealed the production Cruze on 22 October 2001 with a 1 November sales commencement date in Japan. Significantly, the Cruze marked GM's return to Japanese manufacturing for the first time since 1939, with production located at Suzuki's plant in Kosai, Shizuoka. In terms of design, the production version differs slightly from the YGM1: the flared fenders were toned down, and in lieu of the concept's 17-inch alloy wheels, 15-inch wheels were fitted. High-mounted wrap-around tail lights are featured at the rear, with dual circular brake lights set into the bumper—as carried over from the concept.

Powertrains are identical to those fitted to the Suzuki, with 1.3- and 1.5-litre inline-four engines offered and coupled to either a five-speed manual or four-speed automatic transmission. The M13A-equipped models were given the model code HR51S, with the M15A versions designated HR81S. The 1.3-litre was rated at 65 kW (88 PS; 87 hp) and 118 N⋅m (87 lbf⋅ft), while the 1.5-litre delivered 73 kW (99 PS; 98 hp) and 143 N⋅m (105 lbf⋅ft). Both front- (FWD) and all-wheel drive (AWD) layouts were offered, the all-wheel system being an electronically controlled setup. This system utilises an electromagnetic controlling device that receives signals from the anti-lock braking system. Both the 1.3 and 1.5 models could be specified with either FWD or AWD.

To maximise sales penetration, Japanese-market Cruzes were sold at both GM AutoWorld and Suzuki Arena sales channels. AutoWorld dealerships stocked the 1.5-litre car in LS and LT trims, with the 1.3 confined to Suzuki's Arena, available in E and X trims. The vehicle was also in compliance with Japanese government dimension regulations to capitalize on the associated tax benefits to further encourage sales.

After a delay triggered by unfavourable exchange rates from Japan, Holden introduced the Cruze to the Australian market on 1 July 2002. New door trims were fitted and the rear window wiper was made standard from January 2004 production. Holden discontinued the Cruze after January 2006. The Chevrolet version in Japan continued on until 2008.

==== Suzuki Ignis (2003 facelift) ====
Suzuki of Europe utilised the Cruze modifications as an update of the Ignis in 2003. Suzuki extended the Cruze's length by 145 mm (5.7 in), all behind the rear axle, to improve interior room and luggage space. This version was manufactured specifically for the European market in Esztergom, Hungary by Magyar Suzuki. Suzuki in Japan did not utilise the Cruze modifications for its own Suzuki-badged model due to the presence of the Chevrolet version in that market.

The 1.3-litre version came as manual FWD, with the 1.5-litre manufactured in FWD form with both manual and automatic transmission, or as a manual transmission AWD via viscous coupling. Also, a diesel version was available, powered by Fiat's 1.3-litre Multijet engine.

An arrangement with Subaru resulted in the Hungarian-manufactured Ignis being sold alongside the Suzuki-badged model in Europe as the Subaru G3X Justy. Apart from the slightly larger fog lights, different front bumper and grille, plus badging—the Subaru was identical to the Suzuki. Subaru debuted the Justy at the Frankfurt Motor Show in September 2003, going on sale immediately after. Two AWD drive models were available—1.3- and 1.5-litre petrols; there was also a FWD, 1.3-litre turbocharged diesel model. The G3X Justy was not sold in United Kingdom or Ireland in right-hand-drive. The G3X Justy was transferred in 2007 to the Daihatsu Boon/Sirion (M300).

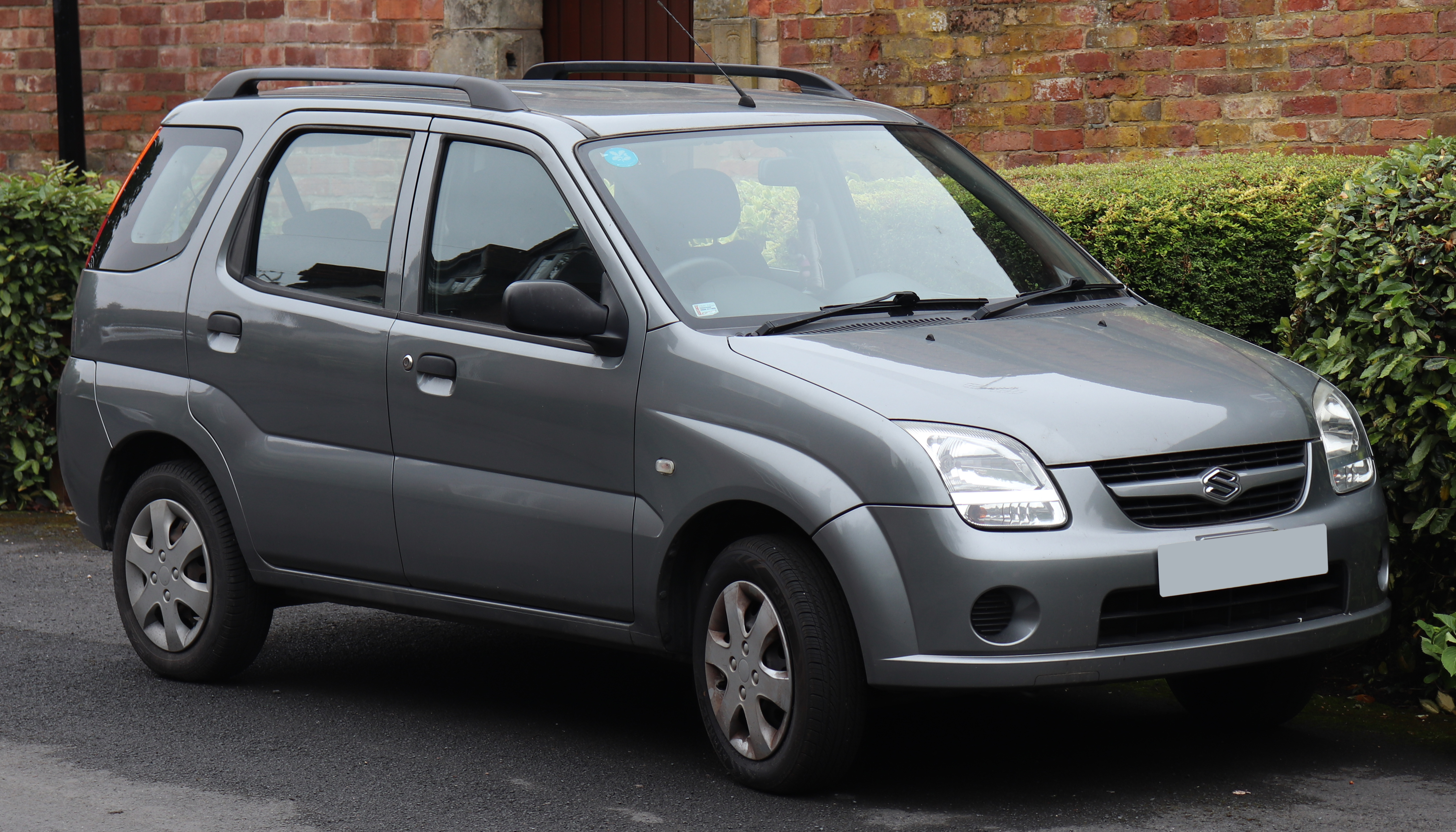
2007 Suzuki Ignis GL (UK)

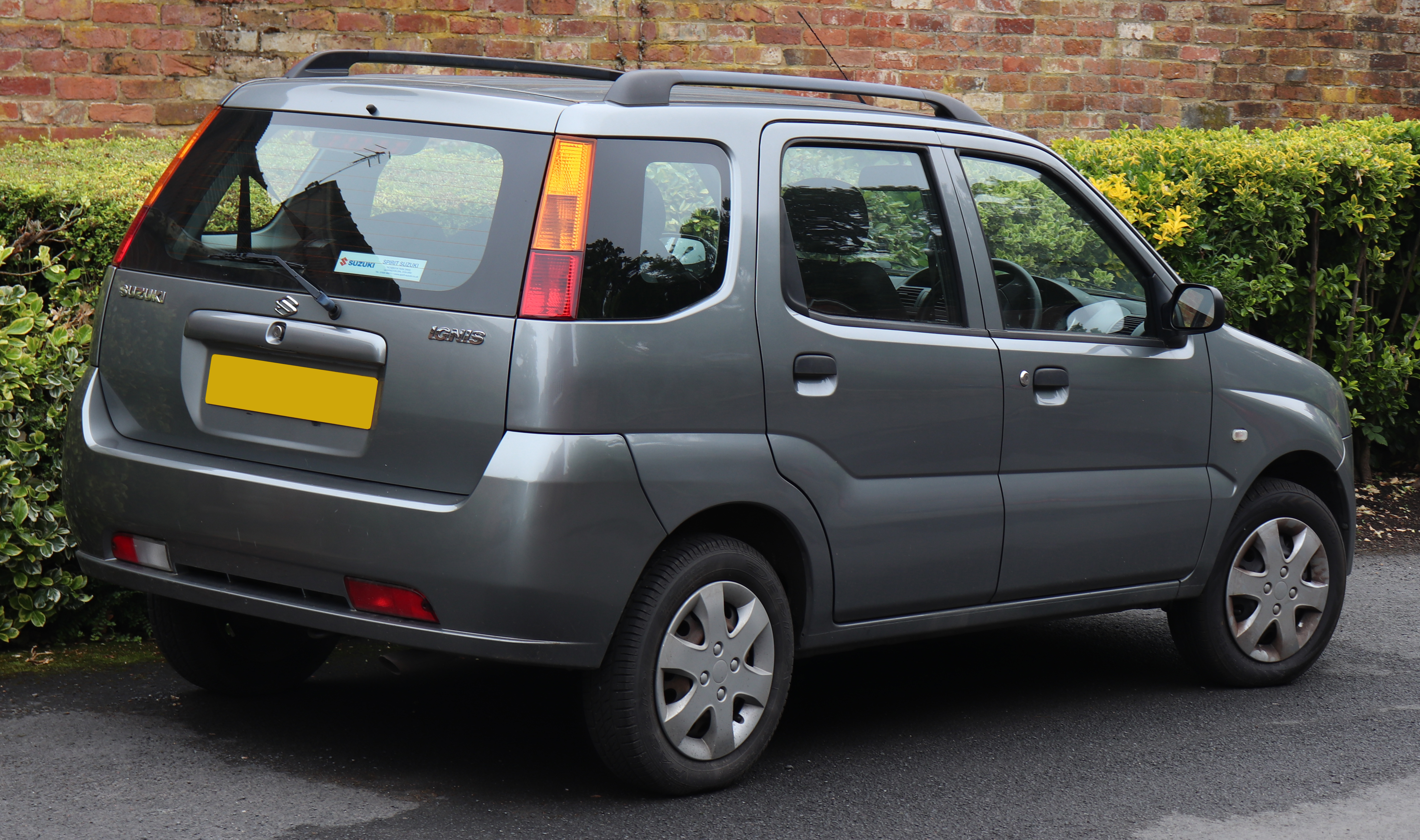
2007 Suzuki Ignis GL (UK)

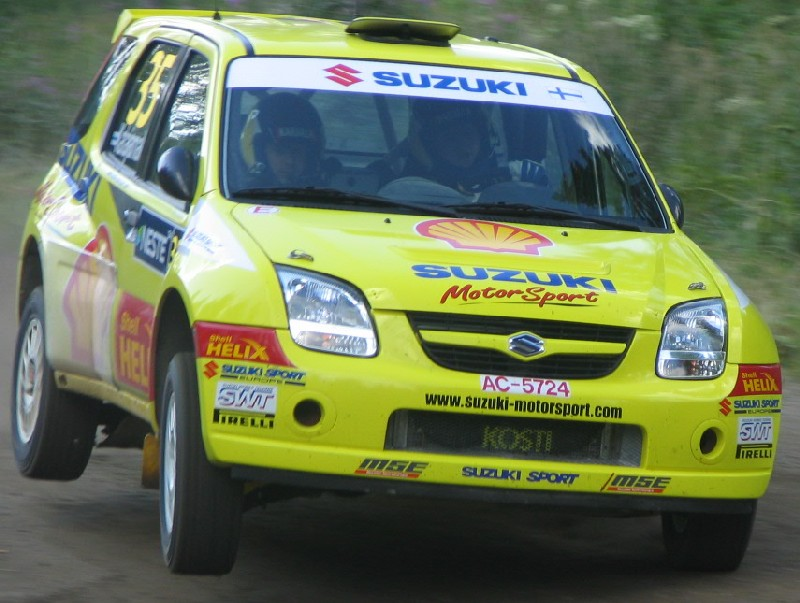
Suzuki Ignis S1600 rally car

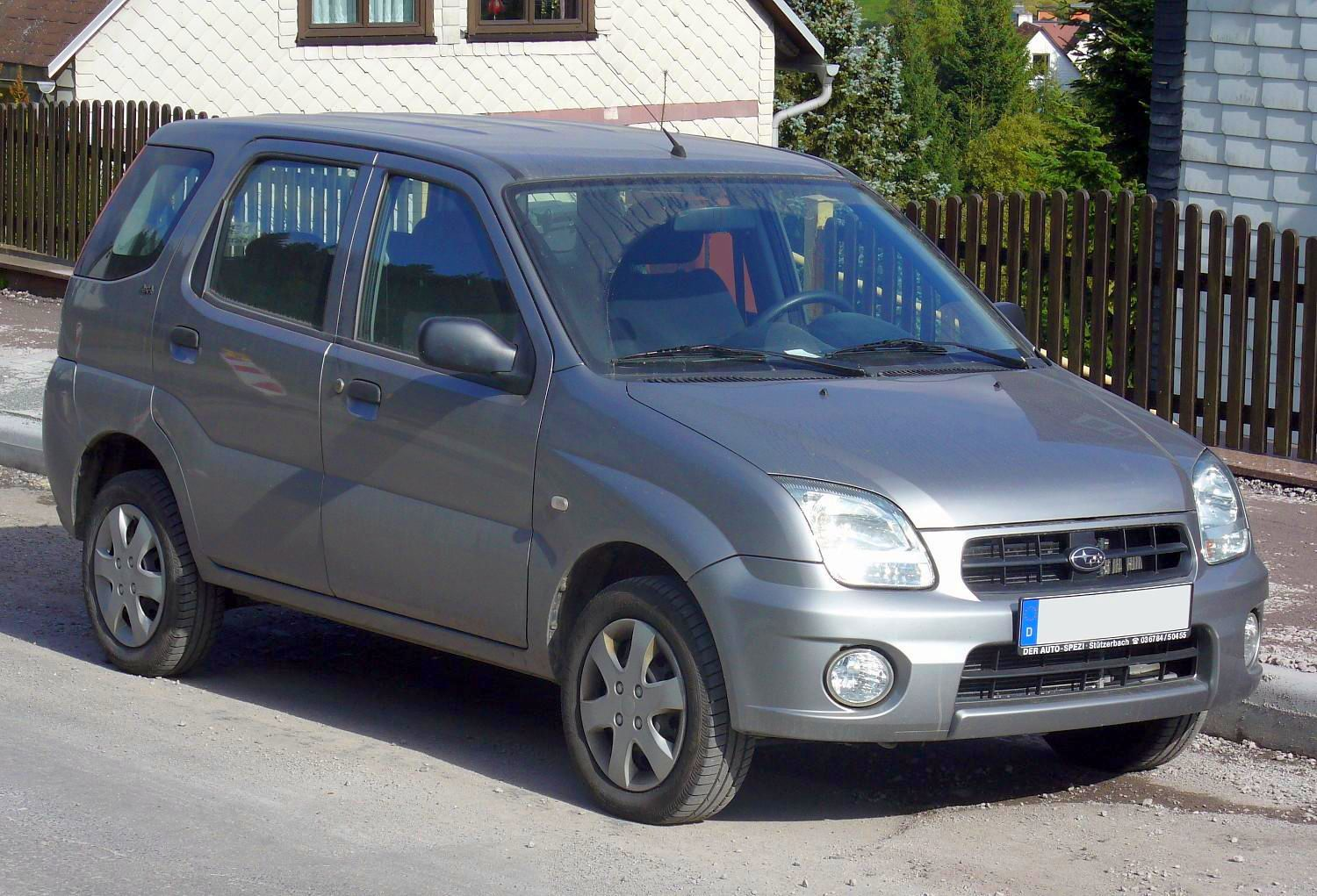
2003–2007 Subaru G3X Justy

== Second generation (MF; 2016) ==
Second generation
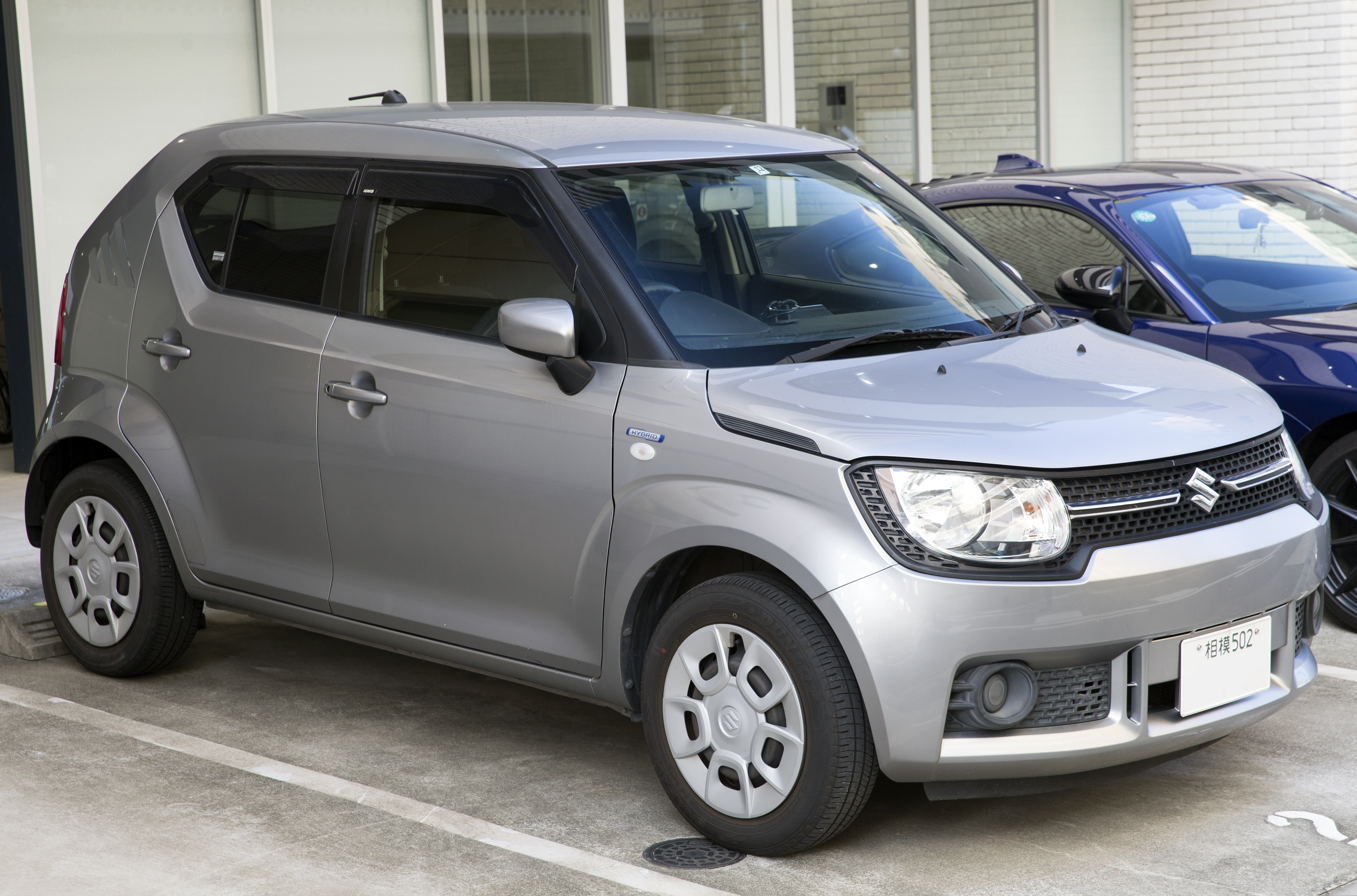
- Suzuki Ignis Hybrid MG (JDM; pre-facelift)

Overview
- Model code: MF
- Production: 2016–2026
- Assembly: Japan: Makinohara, Shizuoka (Sagara Assembly Plant); India: Gurgaon (Maruti Suzuki)
- Designer: Yoshio Takeuchi; Takumi Arita and Yuta Watanabe (facelift)

Body and chassis
- Class: Crossover city car (A-segment)
- Body style: 5-door crossover SUV
- Layout: Front-engine, front-wheel-drive or four-wheel-drive "AllGrip"
- Platform: HEARTECT A platform
- Related: Maruti Suzuki Wagon R (third generation); Suzuki Celerio (third generation); Suzuki Xbee

Powertrain
- Engine: Petrol: 1.2 L K12C Dualjet I4; 1.2 L K12M I4; Mild Hybrid: 1.2 L K12C Dualjet I4 (MHEV); 1.2 L K12D Dualjet I4 (MHEV); Diesel: 1.3 L D13A DDiS I4 turbo-diesel
- Electric motor: WA05A
- Transmission: 5-speed manual; 5-speed automated manual "AGS" (Note: Auto Gear Shift (AGS). In the Indian, Indonesian, European (pre-facelift) and South African markets.); CVT
- Hybrid drivetrain: SHVS Mild Hybrid System

Dimensions
- Wheelbase: 2,435 mm (95.9 in)
- Length: 3,700 mm (145.7 in)
- Width: 1,660–1,690 mm (65.4–66.5 in)
- Height: 1,595–1,605 mm (62.8–63.2 in)
- Kerb weight: 840–920 kg (1,851.9–2,028.3 lb) (FWD); 890–940 kg (1,962.1–2,072.3 lb) (AWD)

Chronology
- Predecessor: Suzuki Splash/Maruti Ritz

On 3 March 2015, Suzuki released details of a small 4WD concept car, called the "Suzuki iM-4" at the 85th Geneva International Motor Show. On 30 October 2015, the production version, known as the Ignis was exhibited at the 44th Tokyo Motor Show.

On 21 January 2016, Suzuki officially announced the launch of the Ignis for the first time in the Japanese market. The car is powered with two versions of the 1.25-litre K12C inline-four engine: a standard petrol, and a mild hybrid with 3Ah lithium-ion battery placed under the front passenger seat to store energy. The hybrid version incorporates an idle stop function operated via the Integrated Starter Generator (ISG); the hybrid components add only 6.2 kg (14 lb) to the overall weight of the car. The engine produces 91 PS (67 kW; 90 hp) and 118 N⋅m (87 lb⋅ft) of torque. The mild hybrid motor produces 3.1 PS (2.3 kW; 3.1 hp) and 50 N⋅m (37 lb⋅ft) of torque. The engine is mated to 5-speed manual and CVT, both available for FWD and AWD configuration.

The second generation Ignis features styling elements referencing the Suzuki Cervo SS20 from 1977, including the embossed vent motifs referencing the rear cooling vents from the SS20.

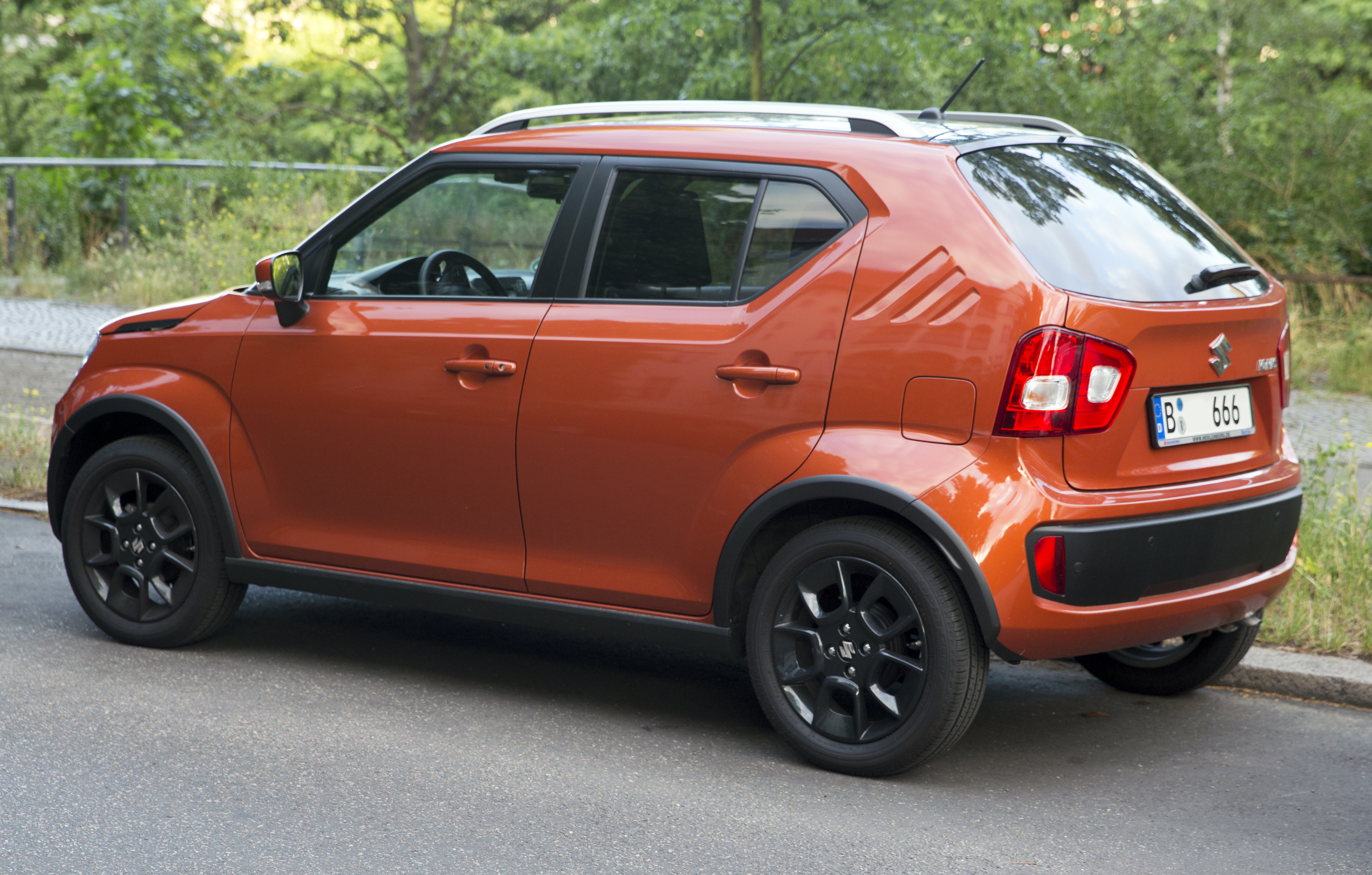
2017 Suzuki Ignis Intro Edition (Germany; pre-facelift)

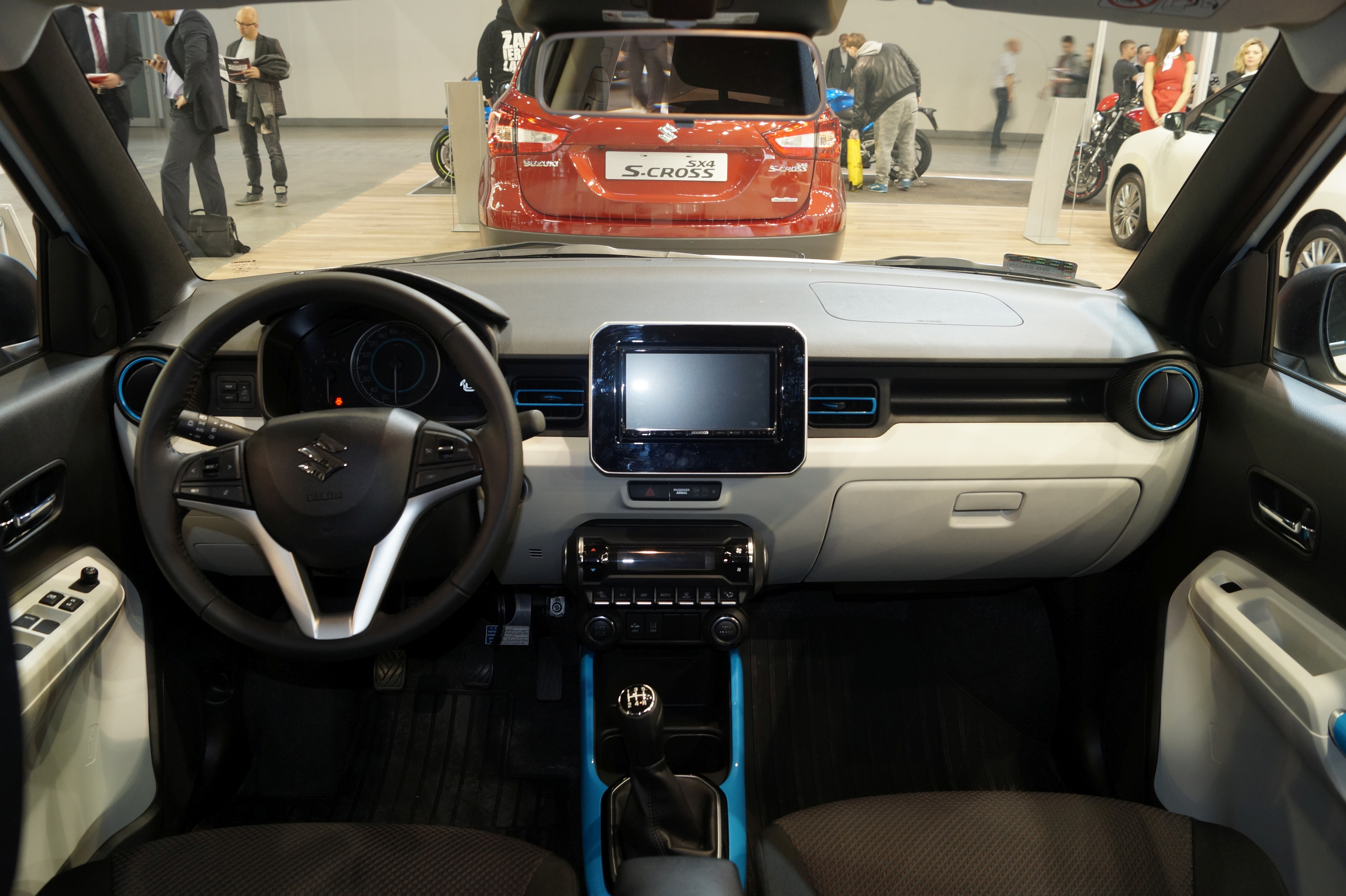
Interior

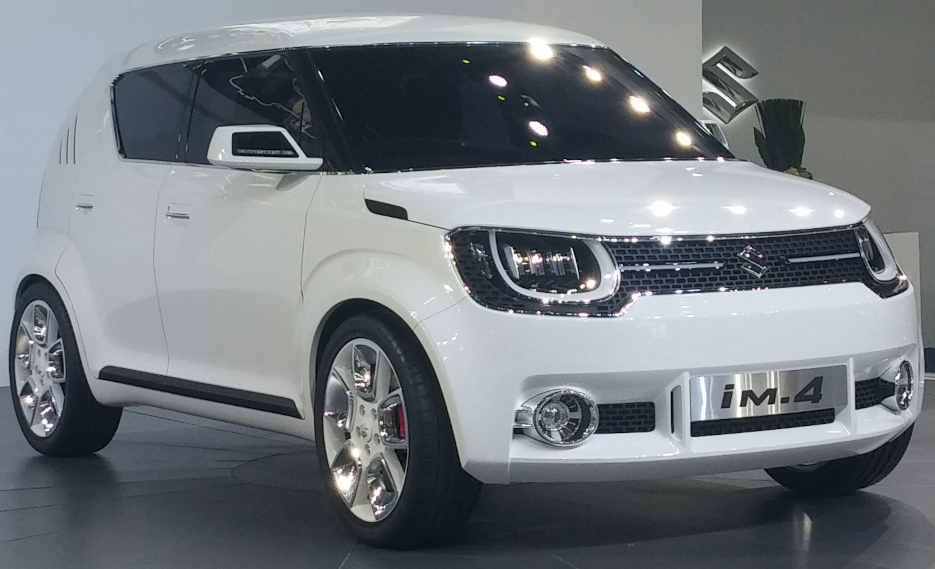
Suzuki iM-4 concept

=== Markets ===
==== Europe ====
The European-spec Ignis is very similar to Japanese-spec. Powered with the same 1.25-litre petrol and mild hybrid engines. The European-spec produces 1 PS (0.7 kW; 1.0 hp) less and 2 N⋅m (1.5 lb⋅ft) more than Japanese-spec. The mild hybrid system produces the same output as Japanese-spec. The transmission available is a 5-speed manual or automated-manual dubbed as "Auto Gear Shift (AGS)" (in recent years Suzuki have switched from AGS to CVT). The AWD option is only available with manual transmission. On 8 January 2018, a special edition with adventure-oriented accessories was launched in the UK.

==== India ====
The Indian-spec model was sold as the Maruti Suzuki Ignis. It was launched as a replacement for the Maruti Suzuki Ritz, manufactured by Maruti Suzuki and sold through the company's NEXA chain of premium dealerships.

It was offered with a 1.25-litre D13A DDiS 190 turbo-diesel engine that produces 75 PS (55 kW; 74 hp) and 190 N⋅m (140 lb⋅ft) of peak torque which also powered the Swift, Baleno in India. The diesel option was discontinued in 2018. The other engine offered with the Indian-spec car was a 1.2-litre K12M unit that develops 82 PS (60 kW; 81 hp) and 113 N⋅m (83 lb⋅ft) of torque. Both these engines were available with either a 5-speed manual or a 5-speed automated manual transmission.

In 2016, the Indian Ignis contained 95% local parts. In July 2024, the company claimed that 280,000 units were sold since the launch in January 2017.

==== Indonesia ====
The Indonesian-spec Ignis was launched by Suzuki Indomobil Motor on 17 April 2017 as an import from India. It is available in two trim levels: GL and GX, powered by a 1.2-litre K12M engine that produces 82 PS (60 kW;81 hp) and 113 N⋅m (83 lb⋅ft) of torque with either a 5-speed manual or automated manual transmission. On 27 January 2018, a special edition with sport-oriented accessories was launched for Indonesian market, based from GL trim known as Ignis Sport Edition. The Ignis was discontinued in Indonesia on 2 July 2024.

=== Facelift ===
The facelifted second generation Ignis was launched in Japan on 4 February 2020, in India on 7 February 2020 at the 15th Auto Expo, in Indonesia on 9 April 2020, in Australia in May 2020 and in the United Kingdom in August 2020. The car received new front and rear bumpers, gauge cluster colour and fabric seats design. A revised front grille featured four slots flanking the Suzuki logo, rather than the original model's honeycomb with a horizontal chrome bar.

In mid-2020, the European-spec Ignis received a brand new 1.2-litre dual VVT mild hybrid engine called K12D Dualjet and became the standard engine, replacing the previous 1.25-litre engine; it now produces 83 PS (61 kW; 82 hp) and 107 N⋅m (79 lb⋅ft). The battery capacity for mild hybrid system is also enlarged to 10Ah. The automated manual "AGS" transmission is also replaced with CVT.

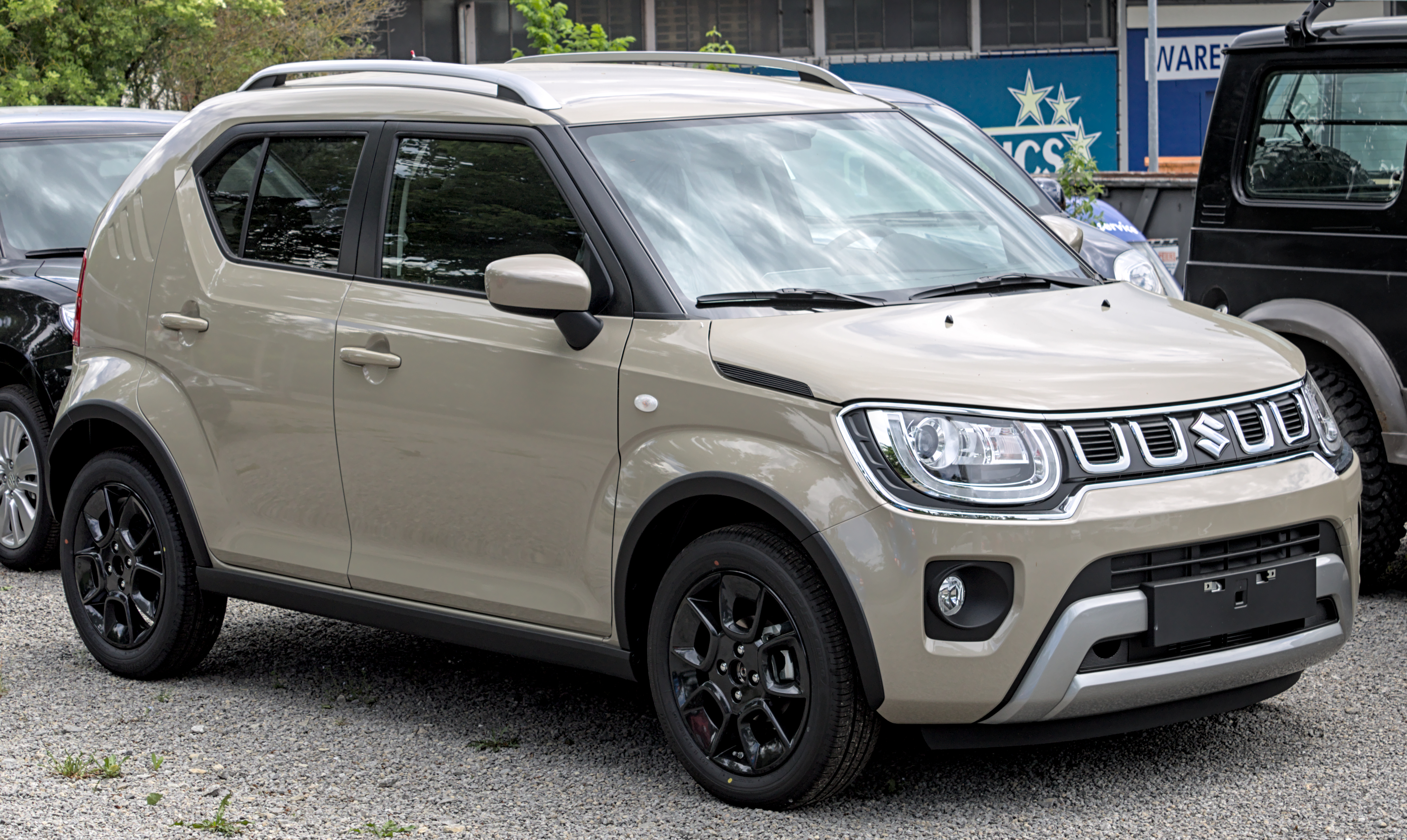
2021 Suzuki Ignis Hybrid (Germany; facelift)

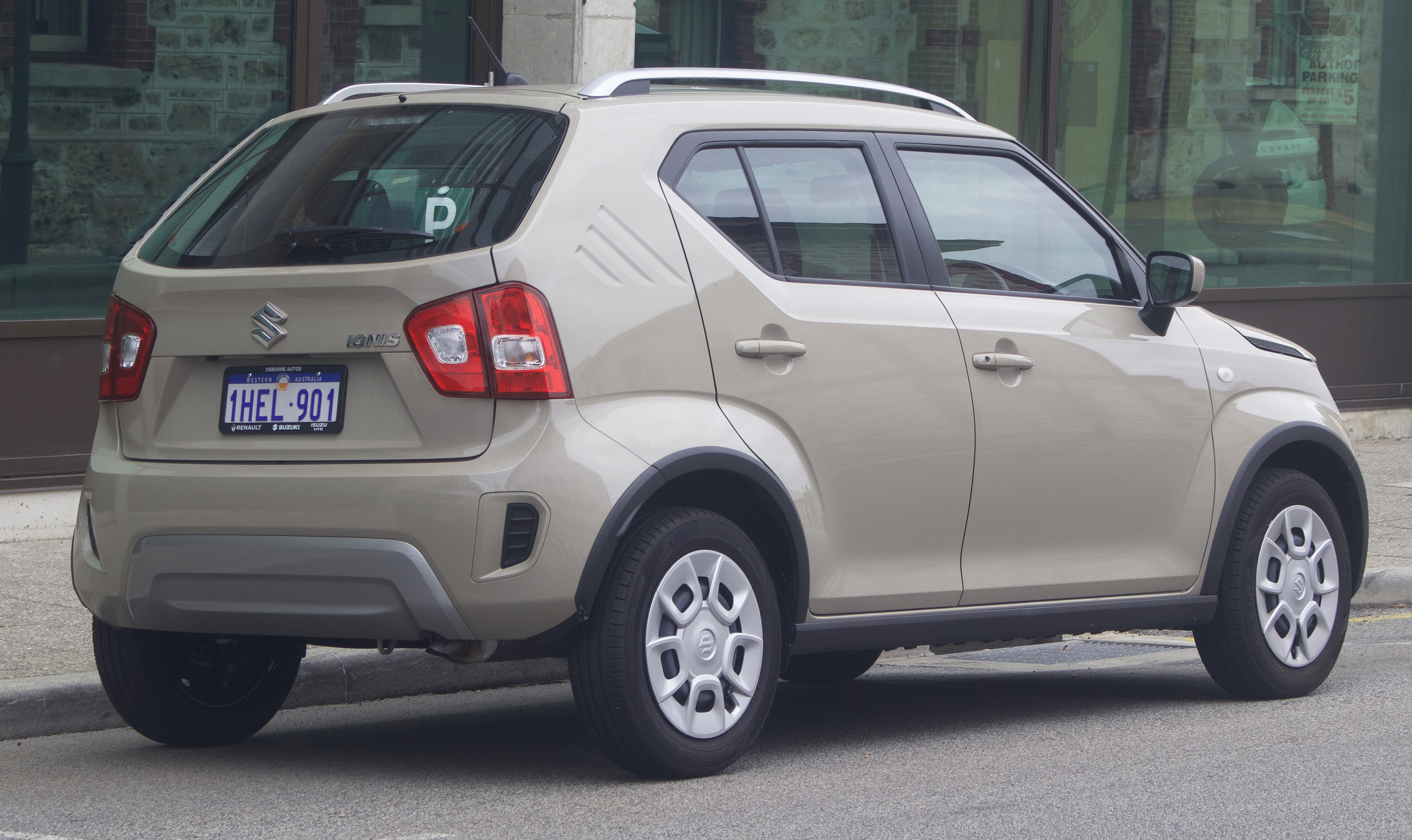
2020 Suzuki Ignis GL (Australia; facelift)

=== Sales ===
Year	Japan	India	Europe	Indonesia	Mexico
2016	24,261		1,602		
2017	11,258	48,285	41,166	14,157	3,401
2018	5,995	43,602	43,774	13,802	5,475
2019	3,678	22,340	38,091	5,138	5,730
2020	2,647	27,200	37,568	1,893	5,158
2021	2,436	32,735	42,206	1,932	5,748
2022	1,988		20,826	904	6,901
2023	1,891			1,252	8,038
2024	871			369	8,242

=== Safety ===
Global NCAP 2.0 test results (India) Maruti Suzuki Ignis (H2 2022, similar to Latin NCAP 2016)
Test	Score	Stars
Adult occupant protection	16.48/34.00	1 /5 stars
Child occupant protection	3.86/49.00	0 /5 stars

- JNCAP (jp) -
- Euro NCAP (2016, with safety pack) -
- Euro NCAP (2016, standard) -

== Bibliography ==
- Bebbington, Terry (2009). 60 Years of Holden. Padstow, New South Wales: Haynes Manuals. ISBN 978-1-876953-58-4.
