= Mooball National Park =

National park in New South Wales, Australia

- IUCN category II (national park)
- Location within New South Wales
- Location: New South Wales
- Coordinates: 28°23′18″S 153°27′53″E
- Area: 12 km^{2} (4.6 sq mi)
- Established: 1999
- Governing body: National Parks and Wildlife Service (New South Wales)
- Website: Official website

Mooball National Park is a national park located in New South Wales, Australia, 648 kilometres (403 mi) northeast of Sydney. It is nearby to the town of Mooball and is 10 kilometres south-east of Murwillumbah. It is on the traditional lands of the Bundjalung people.

It was established in January 1999 and covers an area of 1160 hectares and before this time it was managed by Forests NSW as the Mooball State Forest.

It is one of the largest lowland rainforests in Australia, and is a refuge for several animal species, where it sits in the predominantly clear Tweed and Brunswick Valleys.

== Native flora and fauna ==
The park is home to a variety of native plants and within it theirs are at least 17 vulnerable or endangered plats. The endangered plant species present include:

- Cassia brewsteri var. marksiana (Brush cassia)
- Dendrocnide moroides (Gympie stinger)
- Drynaria rigidula (Basket ferm)
- Elaeocarpus williamsianus (Hairy quandong)
- Endiandra floydii (Crystal Creek walmut)
- Endiandra muelleri subsp. bracteata (Green-leaved rose walnut)
- Tarenna cameronii (Cameron's Tarenna).

The park also supports a number of threatened species including vulnerable mammals.

== See also ==
- Protected areas of New South Wales
