= Speed on Tweed =

Annual motor racing festival

Speed on Tweed is an annual historic motor racing festival held in the Northern Rivers town of Murwillumbah in New South Wales, Australia. The event is modelled on Goodwood Festival of Speed and has consistently attracted the best historic racing cars in Australia and from overseas to visit the small town and since its debut in 2002 has contributed substantially to the region's economy.

While much of the event features displays, stalls, merchandising and musical performances, the featured events occur around the competitive vehicles. Friday night features a tour through the main street of Murwillumbah before the vehicles pull over and park at a street party before moving into their home for the weekend at the showgrounds at the northern end of the town. Saturday night features another street party, in later years saw dining tables set up in the middle of the street with patrons fed by the restaurants that operate in Murwillumbah. The competitive event features a timed sprint which starts from the showgrounds and races along eight local streets racing up the side of a hill before returning to the showgrounds in a challenging course of just over a kilometre.

It was announced in the lead-up to the 2008 event that it would be the last Speed on Tweed organised by the original organising team, led by Roger Ealand. Immediately the battle was on the save the event and very quickly the event found a new home as part of the reborn Rally Australia (Australian leg of the World Rally Championship) that coincidentally was to be held in the Northern Rivers area at the same time of year in 2009. The festival went ahead with Friday and Saturday night on the event taken over by the rally cars, becoming a Super Special stage of the rally.

== Fastest time ==
Year	Fastest; Driver	Elapsed time	Car
2006	Ty Hanger	0:41.78	March 77B
2007	Ty Hanger	0:39.8875	March 77B
2008	Peter Gumley	0:39.4261	Wortmeyer SCV Volkswagen
