= Petter Solberg World Rally Team =

2009-2011 World Rally Championship manufacturer team

Petter Solberg WRT
- Full name: Petter Solberg World Rally Team
- Base: Torsby, Sweden
- Team principal(s): Ken Rees
- Drivers: (Norway) Petter Solberg
- Co-drivers: (Northern Ireland) Chris Patterson
- Chassis: Citroën DS3 WRC
- Tyres: Michelin

World Rally Championship history
- Debut: 2009
- Manufacturers' Championships: 0
- Drivers' Championships: 0
- Rally wins: 0

The Petter Solberg World Rally Team was a team that competed in the World Rally Championship from 2009 to 2011, owned by Norwegian driver Petter Solberg.

== 2009 ==
The team was founded in early 2009 after Solberg, the 2003 World Rally Champion, was left without a drive following the withdrawal of former employer Subaru from the sport. Solberg had been left without a drive going into the 2009 season, so joined forces with Ken Rees, formerly team co-ordinator at Subaru, to establish his own rally team. He acquired an eight-year-old Citroën Xsara and began competing from the second round of the season, Rally Norway, and went on to achieving podiums in Cyprus and Italy. He began using a Citroën C4 WRC for the final two rounds of 2009.

== 2010 ==
Solberg continued to use the C4 WRC during the 2010 season. The team entered a second car on the 2010 Rallye de France for touring car driver Yvan Muller, in a Xsara WRC. 2010 proved to be a very successful season. Solberg finished twelve of the thirteen rounds and amassed eight podiums. This resulted in third place in the final standings, beating factory Citroën drivers Sébastien Ogier and Dani Sordo as well as works Ford driver Mikko Hirvonen.

== 2011 ==
For the 2011 season the team used a brand-new Citroën DS3 WRC, and registered for manufacturers' points for the first time. Solberg managed to finish fifth at the opening round in Sweden after he had his driving licence suspended for speeding on the road section. As this meant he was unable to drive the final stage, his co-driver Chris Patterson took over the wheel. Solberg finished third in Italy and Australia and another podium was looking likely in France, but Solberg was excluded from the results as his DS3 WRC was found to be underweight. Solberg retired from his final WRC event with his own team in Wales and finished fifth in the final standings for the driver's championship, with his team coming fourth in the manufacturers standings. The team also entered drivers in the SWRC. Eyvind Brynildsen competed at six rounds for the team in a Škoda Fabia S2000, co-driven by Cato Menkerud, a former co-driver to both Petter and his brother Henning, and eventual WRC Academy champion Craig Breen drove a Ford Fiesta S2000 for the team in Spain. Brynildsen and Breen finished eighth and tenth in the SWRC respectively, with Brynildsen gaining the team's best finish, coming home second in France. Solberg competed in his final event in a Citroën by winning the Bettega Memorial Rallysprint, beating MotoGP rider Andrea Dovizioso in the final. The team closed down after Solberg announced he was to drive for the Ford World Rally Team in 2012.

== WRC results ==
Year	Car	No	Driver	1	2	3	4	5	6	7	8	9	10	11	12	13	WDC	Points	TC	Points
2009	Citroën Xsara WRC	11	(Norway) Petter Solberg	IRL	NOR; 6	CYP; 3	POR; 4	ARG; Ret	ITA; 3	GRC; Ret	POL; 4	FIN; Ret	AUS				5th	35	-	-
2009	Citroën C4 WRC	11	(Norway) Petter Solberg											ESP; 4	GBR; 4		5th	35	-	-
2010	Citroën C4 WRC	11	(Norway) Petter Solberg	SWE; 9	MEX; 2	JOR; 3	TUR; 2	NZL; Ret	POR; 5	BUL; 3	FIN; 4	GER; 5	JPN; 2	FRA; 3	ESP; 2	GBR; 2	3rd	169	-	-
2010	Citroën Xsara WRC	68	(France) Yvan Muller	SWE	MEX	JOR	TUR	NZL	POR	BUL	FIN	GER	JPN	FRA; 42	ESP	GBR	-	0	-	-
2011	Citroën DS3 WRC	11	(Norway) Petter Solberg	SWE; 5	MEX; 4	POR; 6	JOR; Ret	ITA; 3	ARG; 4	GRE; 4	FIN; 5	GER; 5	AUS; 3	FRA; EX	ESP; Ret	GBR; Ret	5th	110	4th	98
