= Petter Solberg =

Norwegian rally driver (born 1974)

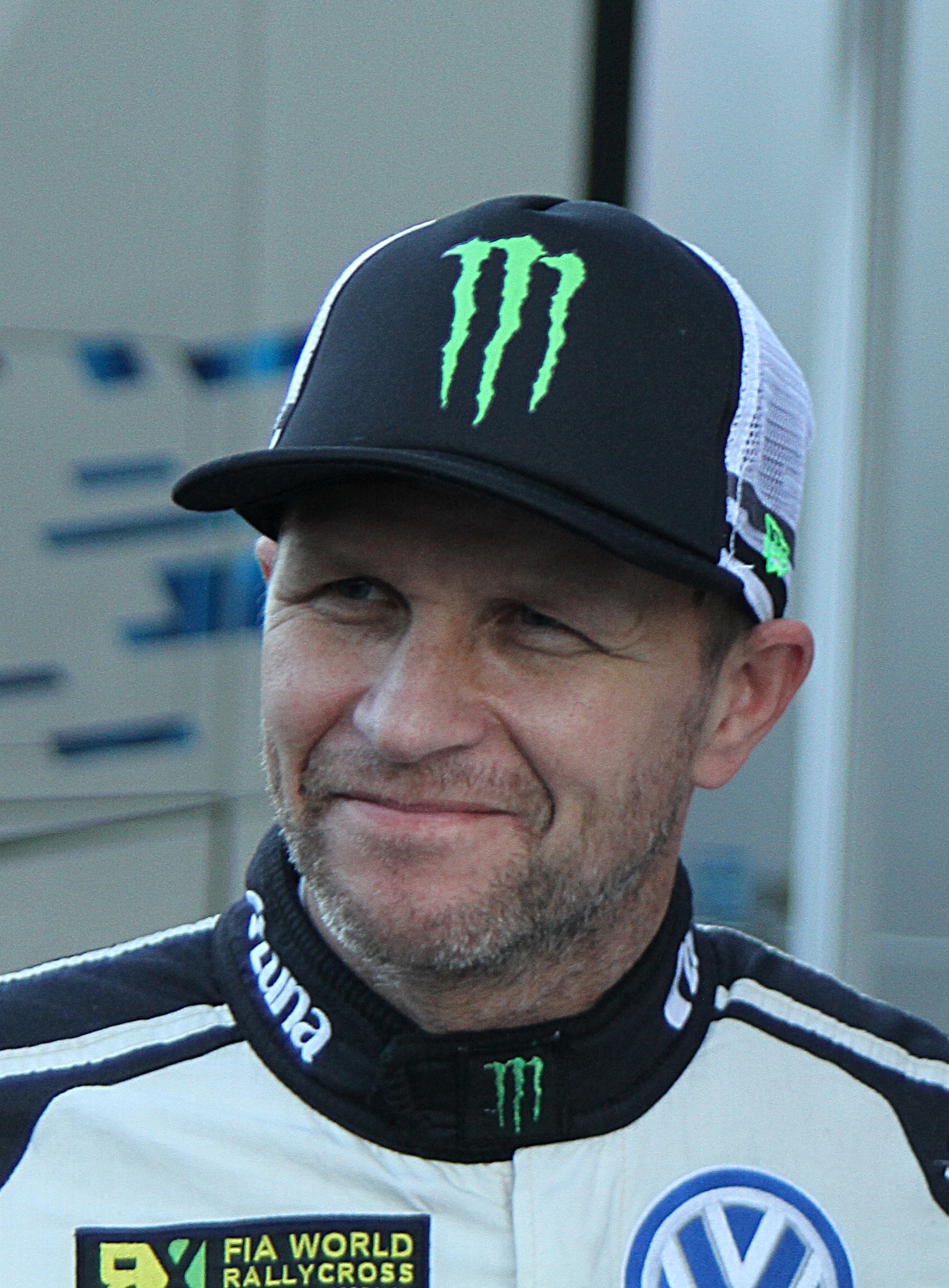
- Solberg at the 2017 World RX of Germany
- Nationality: (Norway) Norwegian
- Born: 18 November 1974 (age 51) Spydeberg, Norway
- Relatives: Henning Solberg (brother); Oliver Solberg (son)
- Current team: PSRX Volkswagen Sweden
- Years active: 2014 – 2018
- Car number: 11
- Spotter: Pernilla Solberg
- Former teams: SDRX, PSRX
- Starts: 61
- Championships: 2 (2014 –2015)
- Wins: 10
- Podiums: 30
- Finished last season: 3rd

FIA ERX Supercar Championship
- Car number: 11
- Former teams: PSRX
- Starts: 9
- Wins: 0
- Podiums: 2
- Best finish: 8th in 2013
Petter Solberg
World Rally Championship record
- Years active: 1998–2012, 2018–2019
- Co-driver: (Norway) Egil Solstad (Norway) Cato Menkerud (United Kingdom) Phil Mills (United Kingdom) Fred Gallagher (United Kingdom) Chris Patterson (Norway) Veronica Gulbæk Engan
- Teams: Ford, Subaru, Petter Solberg World Rally Team, Volkswagen
- Rallies: 190
- Championships: 1 (2003)
- Rally wins: 13
- Podiums: 52
- Stage wins: 460
- Total points: 853
- First rally: 1998 Swedish Rally
- First win: 2002 Rally GB
- Last win: 2005 Rally GB
- Last rally: 2019 Wales Rally GB

Petter Solberg (born 18 November 1974), nicknamed "Mr. Hollywood", is a Norwegian-Swedish former professional rally and rallycross driver.

Solberg debuted in the World Rally Championship in 1998 and was signed by the Ford factory team in 1999. The following year, Solberg started his successful partnership with the Subaru World Rally Team.

With the Subaru works team, Solberg finished runner-up to Marcus Grönholm in 2002 and then became the first Norwegian to win the drivers' world title in 2003. In the following two seasons, he finished runner-up to Sébastien Loeb. Following Subaru's withdrawal from the WRC at the end of the 2008 season, Solberg secured private backing to start the Petter Solberg World Rally Team and competed with a Citroën Xsara WRC, a Citroën C4 WRC and a Citroën DS3 WRC. In 2012 Petter returned to a factory team, joining the Ford World Rally Team 12 years after making his WRC debut with the same team.

Solberg switched to rallycross for the 2013 season, and in the 2014 season he became the inaugural winner of the FIA World Rallycross Championship, after five race wins and nine podium finishes. He repeated his title success the following year. In 2017, Petter set up the PSRX Volkswagen Sweden team in partnership with Volkswagen Motorsport, and won the Team's Championship in both 2017 and 2018 before his retirement from full-time motorsport.

Solberg's son, Oliver Solberg, is also a rally driver; they have regularly competed together at the Race of Champions.

== Career ==
=== Early career ===
Solberg won a nationwide RC car championship the Norwegian Tamiya Cup in 1987 at the age of 13 as he inherited his interest of motorsport through his parents, mother Tove and father Terje, who were keen bilcross (an "inexpensive version" of Norwegian rallycross, similar to Swedish folkrace and Finnish jokamiehenluokka) competitors and rallycross enthusiasts. He used to help out around the home farm rebuilding competition cars, as he was not yet old enough to drive. Solberg entered his first bilcross in 1992, three days after his 18th birthday and only one day after he got his driving license. He went on to become Norwegian champion in rallycross as well as hillclimb in both 1995 (winning 19 out of 21 events) and 1996 (winning 15 out of 19 events). In 1995, he took part in his maiden rally, the Norwegian Rally Bjørkelangen, by driving a Volvo 240 in the Volvo Original class. His female co-driver by then was Maud from Sweden, nowadays spouse of his older brother Henning. In 1998, Solberg became the Norwegian Rally Champion, his brother Henning won this title five times in a row between 1999 and 2003.

=== WRC career ===
By this time and with the aid of his compatriot John Haugland, who helped him on events in the late 1990s, the World Rally Championship team bosses were starting to recognize Solberg's potential and by the end of 1998, after winning a comparative test drive, he agreed to drive for three years as a junior pilot for the Ford Motor Company. Initially expected by Malcolm Wilson to maintain a somewhat lower profile, Solberg actually became a nominated points-scorer for Ford on, of all events, the gruelling test that was the Safari Rally in early 1999, after usual understudy to the team's star driver Colin McRae, Thomas Rådström, suffered an injury and was subsequently ruled out from taking part. He stunned many by finishing in fifth place and scoring both drivers and manufacturers points.

==== 2000–04 ====
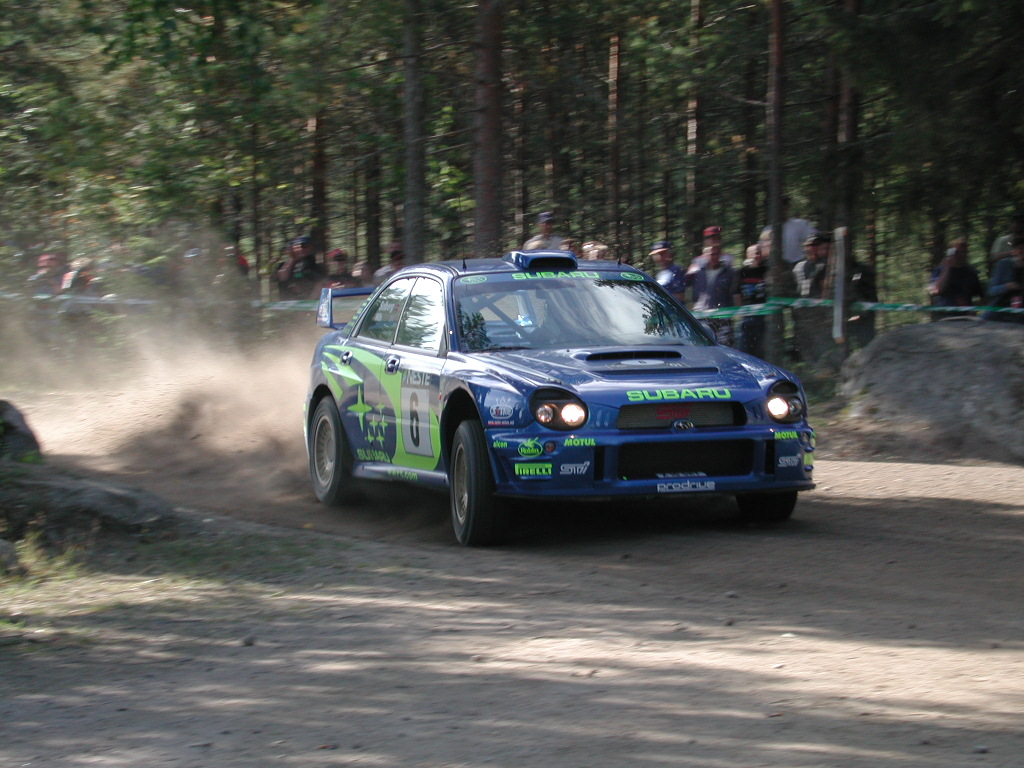
Solberg at the 2001 Rally Finland.

In 2000 however, Solberg was able to leave Ford's M-Sport outfit prematurely, due to an insufficient contract, to sign with the Subaru World Rally Team (SWRT), then led by a driving staff of Richard Burns and Juha Kankkunen. His first podium had to wait until the Acropolis Rally, Greece the following year, as an altruistic Solberg forsook as many of his own points as possible, as he did in dropping voluntarily from fourth to fifth in Corsica, to assist his senior teammate Burns in sneaking to the title.

In 2002 with four-time champion Tommi Mäkinen installed as his new teammate in the light of Burns' departure to Peugeot, Solberg won his first ever WRC event in Wales (Wales Rally GB) after a consistent display of driving prowess and an unlikely accident by Marcus Grönholm. In 2003, Solberg entered the final event, the Wales Rally GB, with himself, Citroën-mounted Sébastien Loeb and Burns in contention for the title. Burns withdrew before the event for health reasons and Solberg finished ahead of Loeb, launching him to his second win in Wales and his first and only World Rally Championship title. Solberg became the first Norwegian to win the drivers' world title.

In his title defence however, Solberg's winning of five of a possible sixteen events, including the hat-trick making Wales Rally GB, proved insufficient to deny the title to a now increasingly efficient Loeb. On Solberg's part, a perhaps unfortunate string of bad luck was encapsulated by three DNFs (retirements) in mid-season.

==== 2005 ====
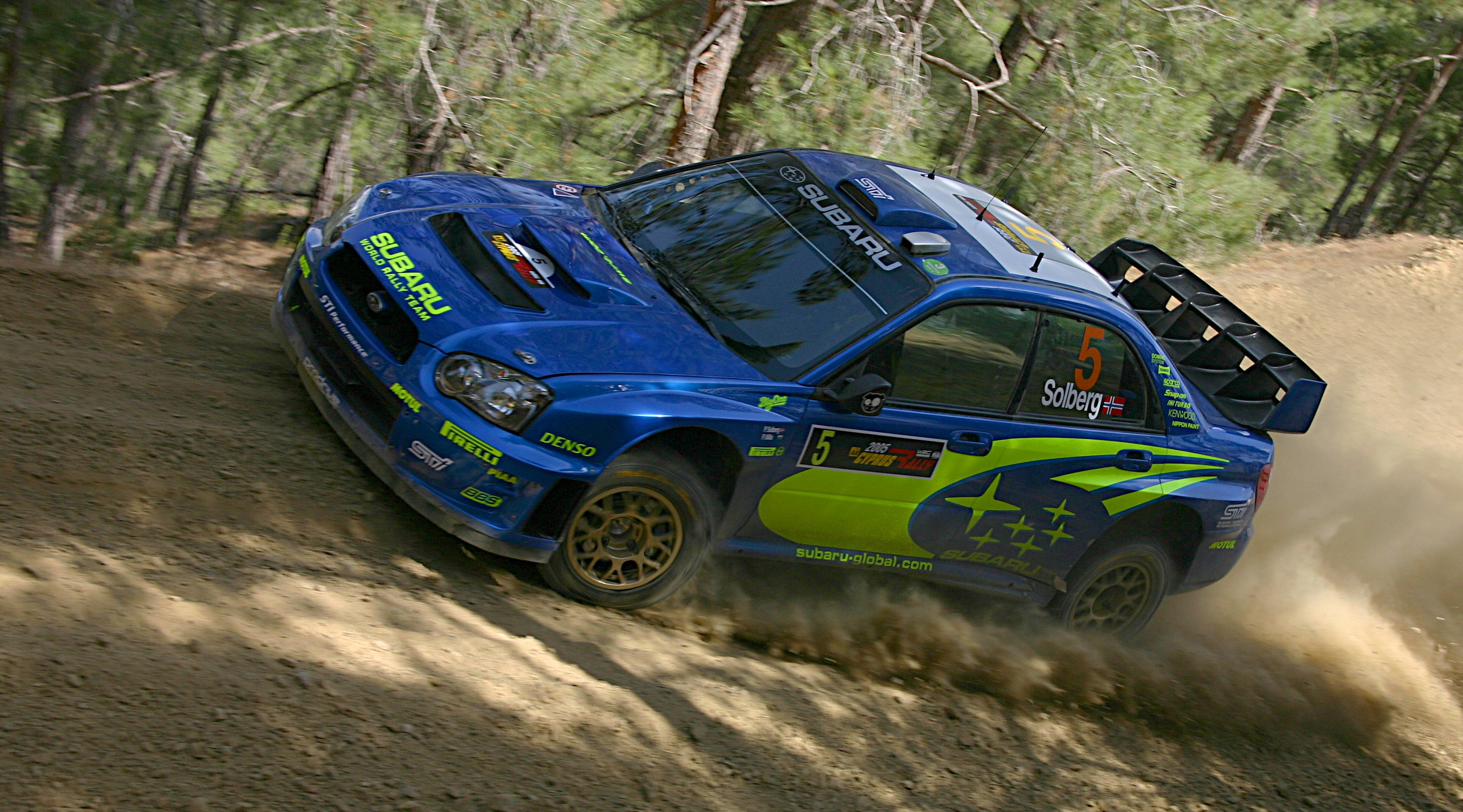
Solberg at the 2005 Cyprus Rally.

Welcoming a new teammate for the year in Australian Chris Atkinson, who replaced the disappointing Finn who had been the former Champion's SWRT teammate throughout 2004, Mikko Hirvonen, Solberg started his 2005 season brightly as he sought an immediate answer to Loeb, the Norwegian winning two of the first three events, in Sweden and Mexico. These successes coincided with the early seizing of a championship lead. He was, however, soon overtaken by a rampant Loeb, and was left to score 71 points for the year, pipping Peugeot's Marcus Grönholm to the championship runner-up spot on a tie break.

Solberg added an unwanted Wales Rally GB win after the death in a day three crash of fellow competitor Markko Märtin's co-driver, Michael Park, with Loeb sacrificing his victory on the road in order to avoid having to simultaneously celebrate the title. This would prove to be his final WRC victory. Solberg won three rallies in all, though was severely affected by bad luck while challenging for wins at the end of the season, most notably on the Telstra Rally Australia, where he was forced to retire after striking a wayward kangaroo.

==== 2006 ====
Solberg interviewed during the 2006 Rally Australia.

For 2006, Solberg continued his partnership with the Subaru team, driving a new version of the Impreza WRC. His main sponsor was 24SevenOffice with a 5 million kroner sponsorship deal, a Norwegian record. His results, though, proved patchy in comparison to Loeb. While Loeb went on to register five rally victories on the bounce in a privately (Kronos) run Citroën Xsara WRC, his winning of the title unhampered even by breaking his arm at an advanced stage of the season, Solberg could only comparatively muster a handful of runner-up places on rallies all season — in Mexico, Argentina and Australia. Failure to claw his way any higher than sixth in the year's final points standings duly brought an end to the chain of top three drivers' championship appearances which Subaru had enjoyed since 1994.

==== 2007 ====
Solberg did, at least, get his 2007 season off to a rather more auspicious start, managing a joint-career-best finish of sixth place on the Rally Monte Carlo. He surrendered a potential third-place finish in Sweden after a substantial time loss, as well as being bested by his brother, Henning, in the race for the final podium place on the siblings' home event – Rally Norway. In Mexico, Argentina and Sardinia Solberg struggled with his Impreza — technical problems caused two retirements and a plummet down the leaderboard in Italy. Good pace in Portugal and taking third place on the Acropolis Rally at least appeared to mark a turnaround in the quality of the younger Solberg's results, although even Greek event wasn't problem-free for the Norwegian as he experienced some damper problems.

Despite Subaru's confidence in their car performance and reliability built up during summer break tests, Impreza S12A failed again — Solberg had to retire on day two in Finland, after monstrous handling and steering problems which the engineers were unable to deal with. On the next round, Rallye Deutschland, where he finished sixth, the car by itself was reliable, but the Norwegian hit a rock on SS5 heavily damaging the steering, which had cost him considerable amount of time because the team wasn't able to fully repair it. The New Zealand event was another problem-ridden outing for Solberg — he described the handling difficulties as similar to those he had experienced in Finland earlier.

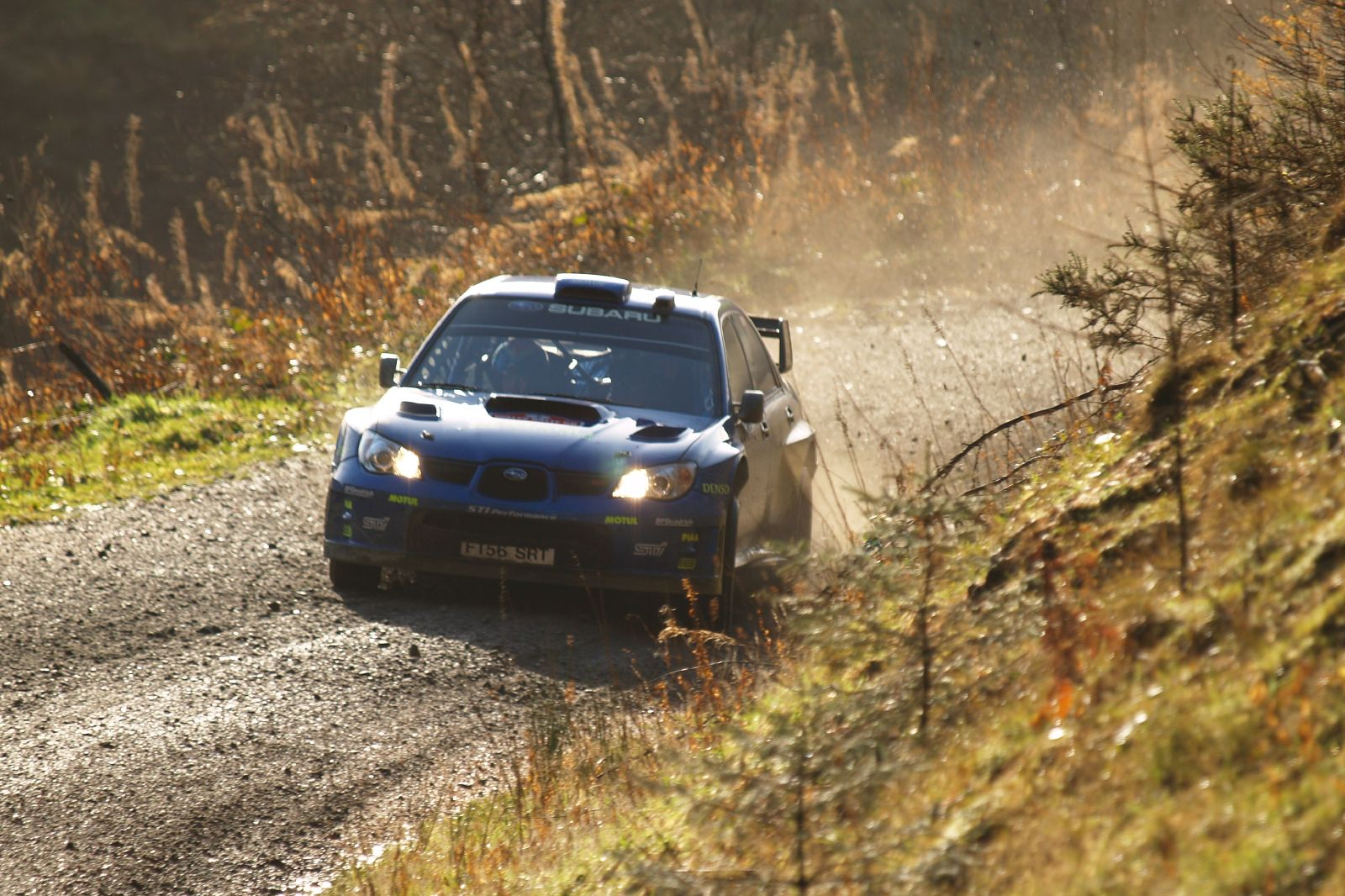
Solberg with his Subaru Impreza WRC2007 at the 2007 Rally GB.

At the next round on Rally Catalunya, it was a difficult rally for Solberg — he struggled to maintain a good pace and in the end finished sixth, almost 3 minutes adrift from the winner, Loeb. He was however pleased with changes in car setup made for day 3, which seemed promising for the following Tour de Corse. Unfortunately for the Norwegian, the setup wasn't as good and he had problems with handling again which, along with a stalled engine on the start of SS5, resulted in a disappointing fifth place, behind young Finn Jari-Matti Latvala. In Japan, his team's home event, Solberg clocked several top-ten times on the early stages, but crashed badly on SS5 then, probably due to damage sustained in accident, his gearbox locked in sixth gear, forcing his retirement for the day. He later rejoined the competition under the SupeRally format and finished 16th, managing to score two points in the Manufacturers' Championship. On the day of his 33rd birthday, Solberg finished fifth on Rally Ireland, calling it "the most difficult rally he has ever done"; he had also found his car's performance better than in previous events.

On the final event of the season, Wales Rally GB, Solberg had consistent pace and won the battle for fourth with Spaniard Dani Sordo even though the Norwegian hit a rock in the morning and again had some minor handling issues. This result allowed Subaru to retain their third place in the Manufacturers' Championship, and Solberg ended the 2007 season in fifth place overall. He also took part in the 2007 Race of Champions, representing Norway, along with his brother, Henning. He didn't manage to win the first race with David Coulthard, but in Nation's Cup Norwegian brothers made their way to the semi-finals.

==== 2008 ====
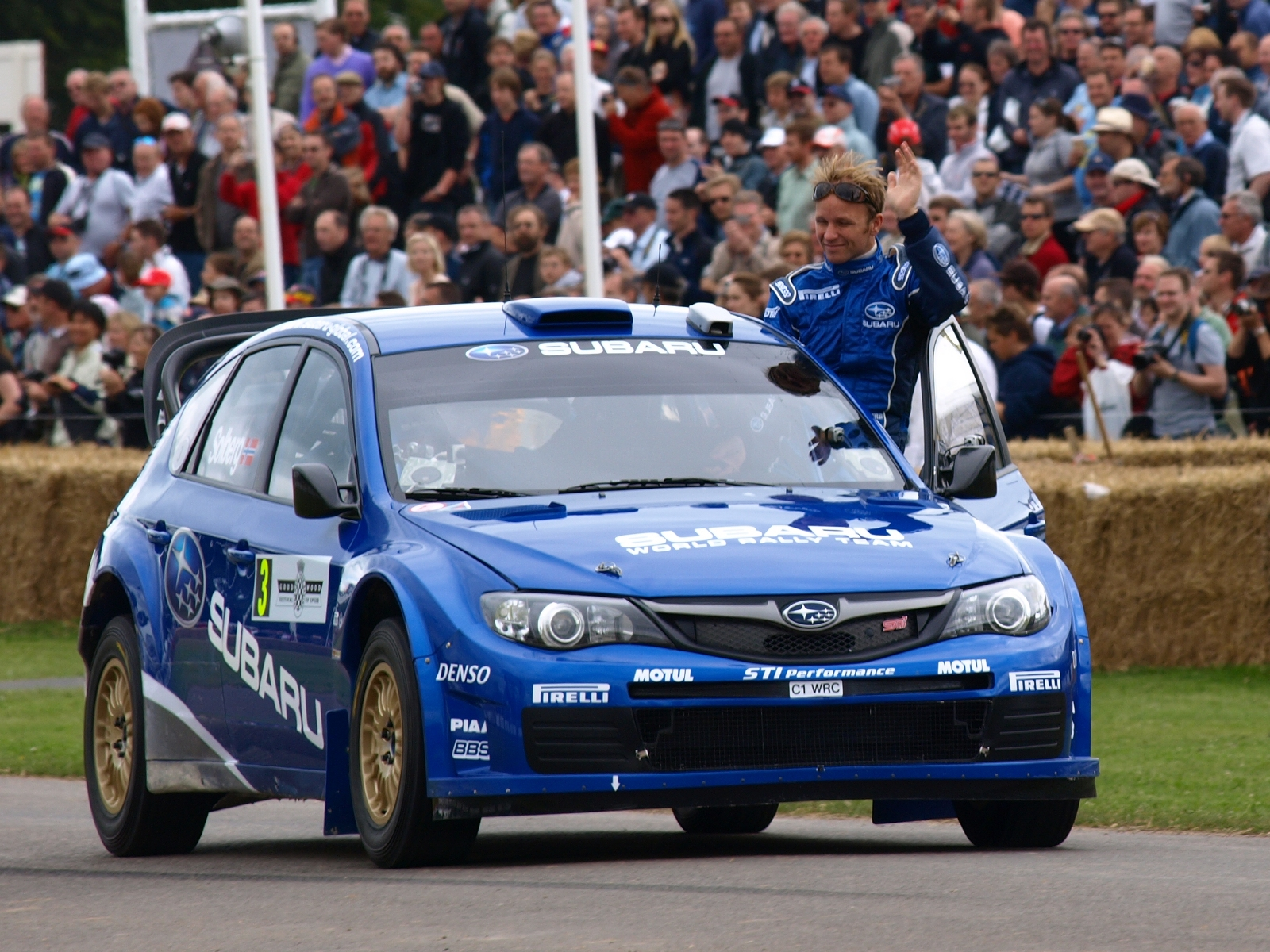
Solberg with the new hatchback Impreza WRC at the Goodwood Festival of Speed.

For the 2008 season, Solberg and Atkinson were retained by SWRT as driving staff. Solberg started his season with a fifth place in Monte Carlo and fourth in Sweden, but went on to retire or finish outside point-scoring positions in the following four events. A radical new hatchback homologation of the long-serving Subaru Impreza, the WRC2008, debuted on the Acropolis Rally, marked by the Norwegian collecting a runner-up spot to Sébastien Loeb.

Although Solberg went on to break his personal record in consecutive point-scoring finishes, Acropolis remained his only podium of the season. He finished sixth overall in the drivers' championship, four points behind teammate Chris Atkinson, while Subaru took third place in the manufacturers' standings.

==== 2009 ====
Subaru announced on 16 December 2008 that they would not be participating in the World Rally Championship any longer, a mere day after Suzuki announced their withdrawal. Solberg and co-driver Phil Mills were left without a ride. Looking at their options with the remaining teams they had to sit out the 2009 season opening Rally Ireland. After careful evaluation of several privateer options including Ford and Citroën cars, Solberg confirmed having acquired (most likely leased) a Citroën Xsara WRC (in 2006 WRC spec) as of 25 January 2009, and that Phil Mills and himself would return to the WRC in a privateer team for the 2009 Rally Norway. On 1 February 2009, Solberg indicated that five sponsors for the 2009 season were in place. The sponsors announced were Microsoft, Pareto, Hurtigruta Carglass and two undisclosed sponsors.

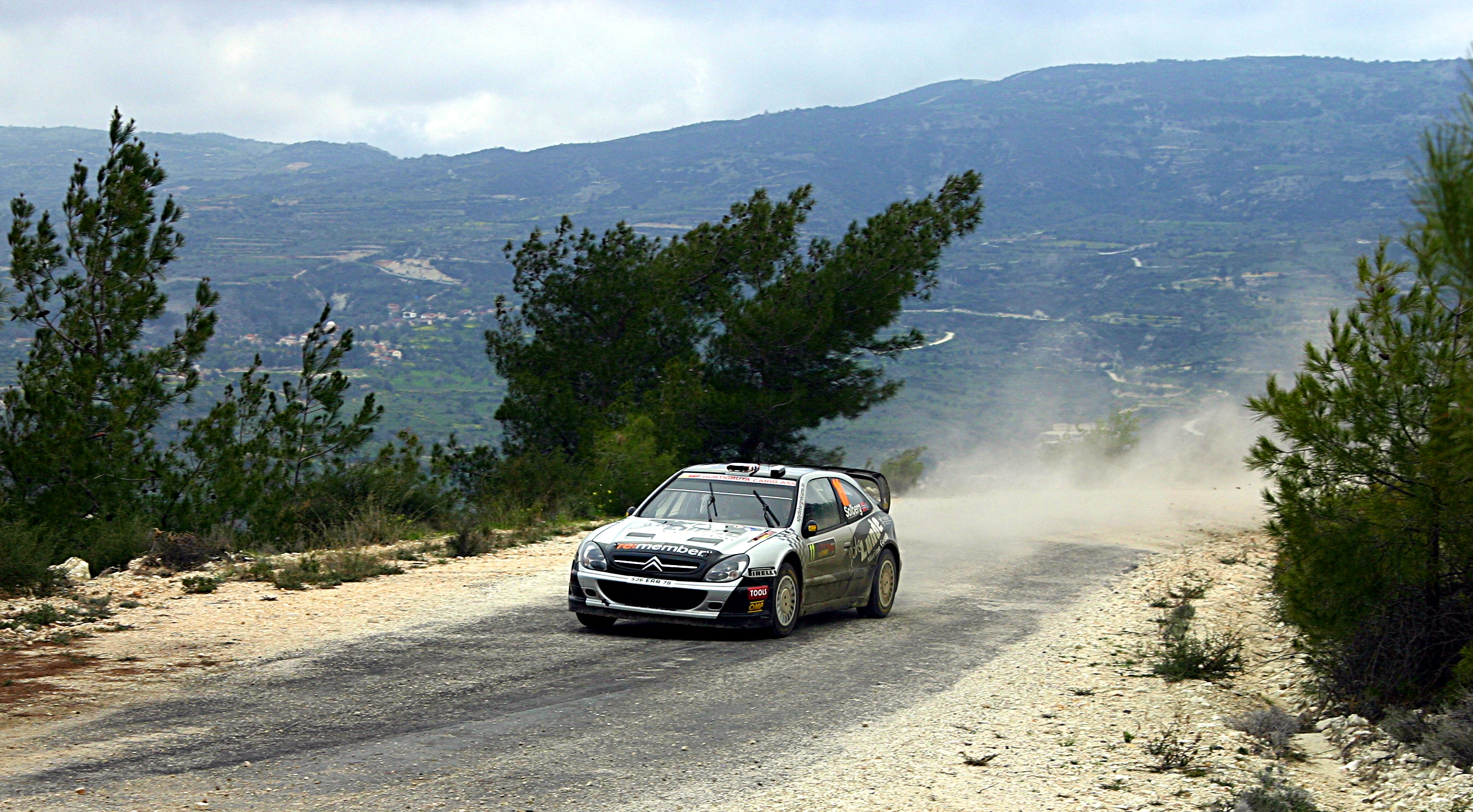
Solberg driving a Citroën Xsara WRC at the 2009 Cyprus Rally.

On 6 February 2009, Solberg officially unveiled the Petter Solberg World Rally Team, with himself as driver and Phil Mills as codriver. The team served Solberg and his 2006-spec. Citroën Xsara WRC with active suspension and diffs. A 13-member team, PSWRT employed ex-Subaru World Rally Team members Ken Rees as team manager, and François-Xavier "FX" Demaison as chief engineer. The PSWRT also returned Solberg's personal friend and ex-SWRT member, Tore Dahl, to the WRC scene as a mechanic. Swede Sven-Inge Neby, for about 40 years the engineer of Petter's father-in-law Per-Inge Walfridsson and his brothers Lars-Erik Walfridsson and Stig-Olov Walfridsson, is another support to the international team.

It took some time to adapt to the new car during their first round in Norway, but eventually Solberg and Mills managed to secure a sixth place and three points in the drivers' championship. Following that result and a new engine from Citroën, Solberg finished third in the Cyprus Rally, being the first true privateer in a privately run team to be in the podium since Malcolm Wilson back in 1993. Solberg managed to repeat this feat in Sardinia.

Solberg and Mills retained their consistent fight for third and fourth position through the three next rallies; Portugal, Argentina (Retired from third position due to loss of fuel pressure on the final stage) and Italy. Solberg "threatened" to swap to a Peugeot 307 WRC, unless he got the 2006 spec upgrades for his Xsara. He received the upgrades (mainly improved intercooler and mechanical differentials) for Sardinia, which made them able to defend a 3rd place, in very hot conditions. Solberg expressed that they were unable to push harder in hot temperatures, and remained open to analyze what to do for the next events. Solberg was believed to be in talks of upgrading to a Peugeot 307 CC but decided to stick with the Xsara. After retiring from Rally Finland, Solberg decided to miss Australia to concentrate on finding a more competitive car. After testing a Citroën C4 WRC in France, and a Ford Focus RS WRC in Britain, Solberg confirmed he would drive a C4 at the final two rounds of the season, Rally Catalunya and Wales Rally GB. The car was to be a 2008-spec C4, but would feature updates to bring it as close as possible to the factory cars of Sébastien Loeb and Dani Sordo. Solberg continued to drive for his own Petter Solberg World Rally Team for Catalunya, but was a nominated points scorer for the Citroën Junior Team at Wales Rally GB, alongside Sébastien Ogier. He finished in 4th position in both of these events, and ended up 5th in the overall 2009 Drivers' Championship standings.

==== 2010 ====
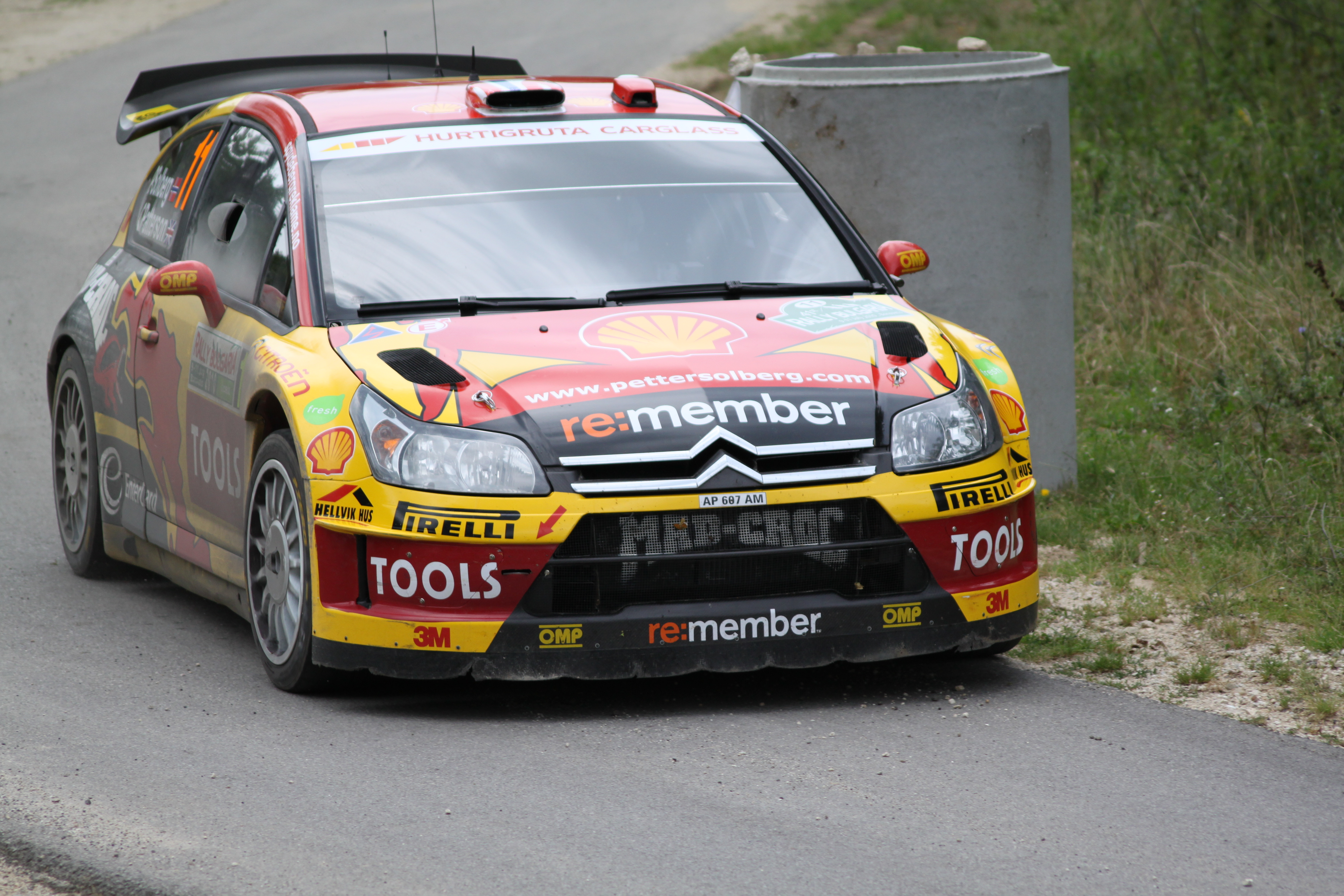
Solberg in SS3 "Lubnitsa", 41st Rally Bulgaria, 2010

Solberg announced on 12 January 2010 that he had purchased two Citroën C4 WRC (2009-spec) cars from Citroën and that he would compete in the 2010 World Rally Championship. On the Swedish Rally, Solberg was unable to find the rhythm and pace, and finished ninth earning him two points. At the second round of the season, the Corona Mexico Rally, Solberg held the lead after day 1, with a 27sec gap down to Loeb on third. With Solberg sweeping the road on Saturday, Loeb advanced to a 55 sec lead by the end of the day, with Solberg on second place 2.7 sec ahead of Sébastien Ogier. A great battle for second place played out on Sunday, with Solberg trailing Ogier with 0.6sec going into the last super special stage. Solberg sat a fastest stage time here by 1.4 sec which secured the second place podium finish, marking the best result by PSWRT to date. In the third Round of the season, Rally Jordan, Solberg trailed Latvala (−16s), Ogier (−19s) and Loeb (−43s) going into the last day. Ogier was sacrificed in a new level of tactics, sending him out as first car as road sweeper for Loeb, while receiving penalties and losing his good position. The exploiting of the rules received much criticism, and was subsequently banned for the next rally. The other drivers kept their position with Solberg scoring a third place podium. In Rally Turkey, 16–18 April, Solberg held a good position through the whole rally, and had a serious chance to battle for the victory on the last day, positioned second on the road, 16sec after Loeb. With several stages canceled on safety reasons due to too much mud, and later a scary meet with a tree on the slippery conditions, Solberg wisely stopped fighting and conceded to secure the second place. Hirvonen, Latvala, Sordo and Ogier all had incidents/offs, hindering them to challenge Solbergs position. This result put Solberg second in the Driver's Championship standings, one point ahead of Hirvonen and six points ahead of Latvala, but a full 40 points after Loeb, with four out of 13 rallies completed. In Rally New Zealand, Solberg made a tactical blunder, simply by not adapting any road position tactics, and finished in first position on day 1, with a marginal lead. Sweeping Saturday's stages left him 54 sec behind, in fifth place, realistically out of reach of a win. But for the final 30 km stage of the rally, four drivers were within 18 seconds of the lead, which led to an epic four-way battle for the victory, between Ogier, Latvala, Solberg and Loeb. Three of them took a maximum-attack, high-risk approach, which none of them managed to complete without incident. Ogier and Loeb both had a spin that cost them some seconds, and Solberg going too fast around a high speed bend hit a telegraph pole on the road shoulder and retired from third position. Latvala did no serious mistakes and took his third WRC win by 2.4 seconds. Loeb crashed two times during this rally, but still managed to finish only 15 seconds behind. On 11 June 2010, PSWRT announced that Phil Mills had decided to leave the codriver seat to focus on other things in life. This brought to an end a 152-event unbroken run of the pair competing together, over 11 years since 1999. In their time, they had driven for Ford, Subaru, and for their own Citroën team, winning 13 individual world rallies and the 2003 world title. On 29 June, PSWRT announced that Chris Patterson would be Solberg's new codriver.

In their first rally together, the tarmac event Rally Bulgaria, Solberg and Patterson put in an impressive performance; five stage wins and finished third, 6.8 seconds off Dani Sordo in second place.

After more podiums in Japan, France and Spain, Solberg finished second on Rally GB, securing his goal of finishing in the top-three in the championship.

==== 2011 ====
On 14 January 2011, PSWRT confirmed that Solberg will compete in the 2011 World Rally Championship in a Citroën DS3 WRC.

In February, Solberg had his driving licence suspended in Sweden after police caught him travelling 32 km/h above the speed limit on the way to the fifth stage of the country's WRC round, forcing co-driver Chris Patterson to take up the wheel.

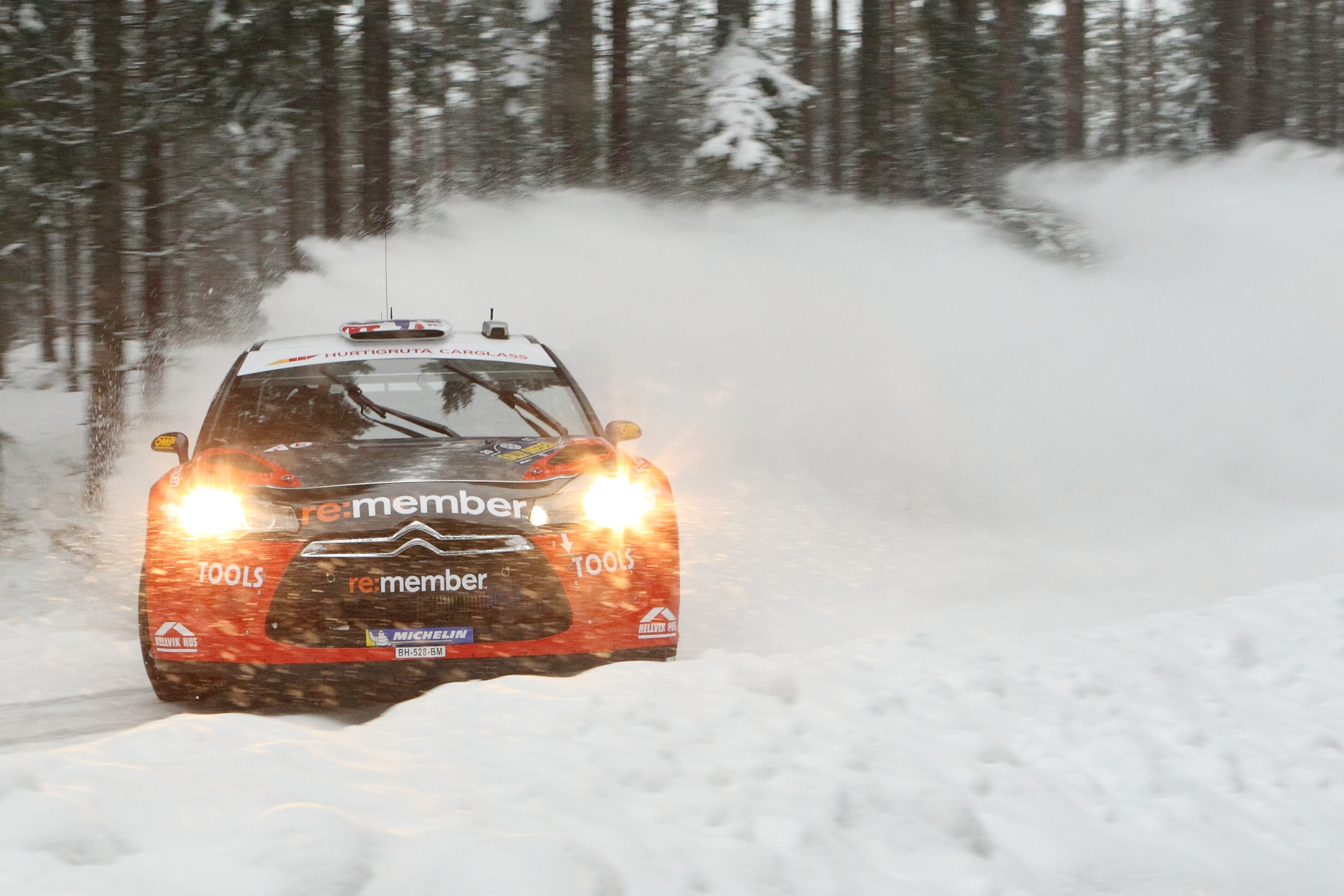
Solberg at 2011 Rally Sweden.

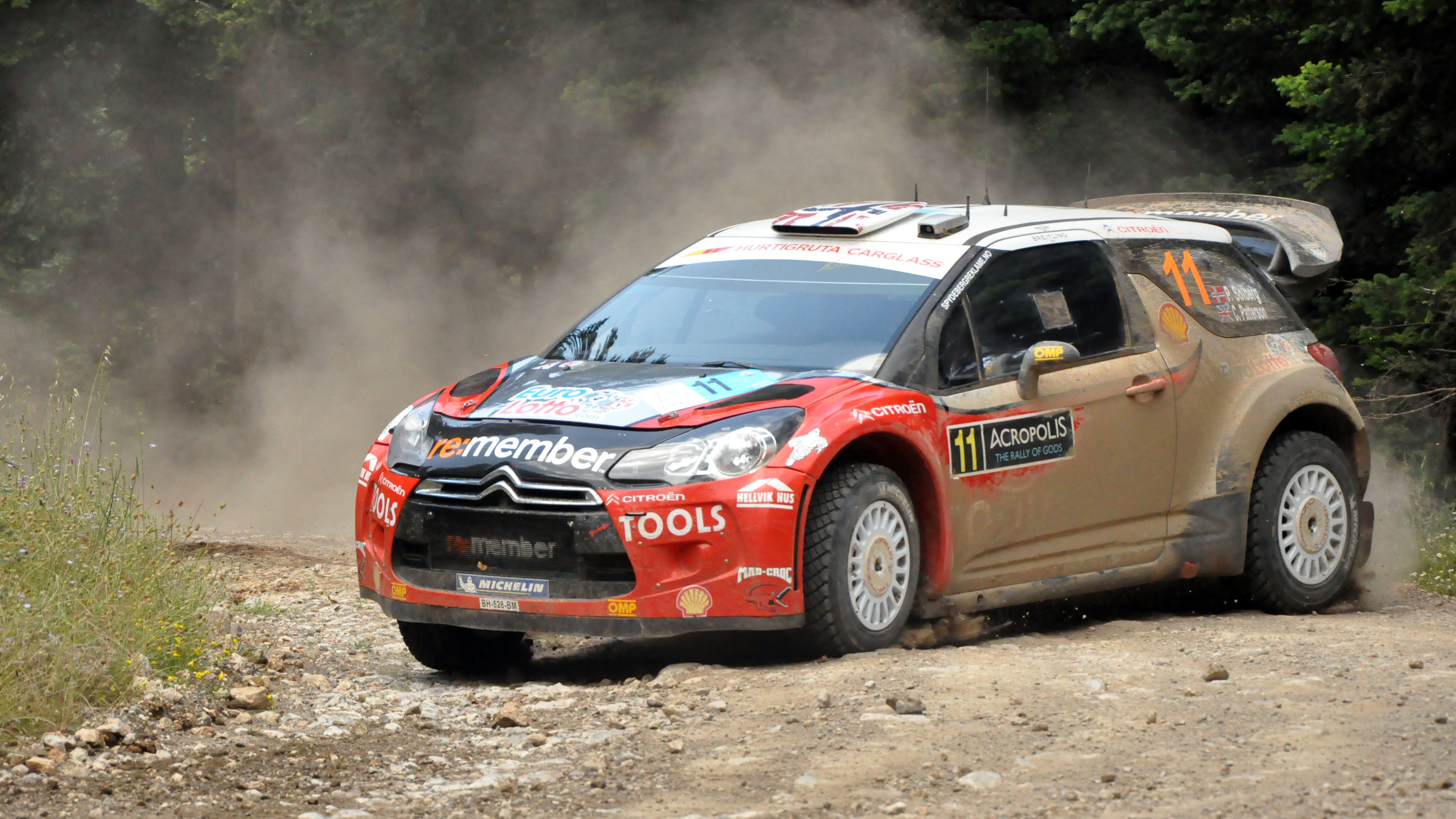
Petter Solberg at 2011 Acropolis Rally.

==== 2012 ====
In December 2011, Ford confirmed that Solberg would return to the factory team of Ford in 2012. Round 1 in Monte-Carlo saw Solberg's first podium finishing in third. Sweden saw the Norwegian come fourth. Mexico brought Solberg another podium in third. A round later in Portugal, he finished fourth before Mikko Hirvonen was stripped of his victory because the car violated some regulations. After that, he was promoted to third place giving him yet another podium, and higher location in the overall standings in second, four points behind leader, Loeb. On 4 December 2012, Solberg confirmed he would sit out of the WRC 2013 season.

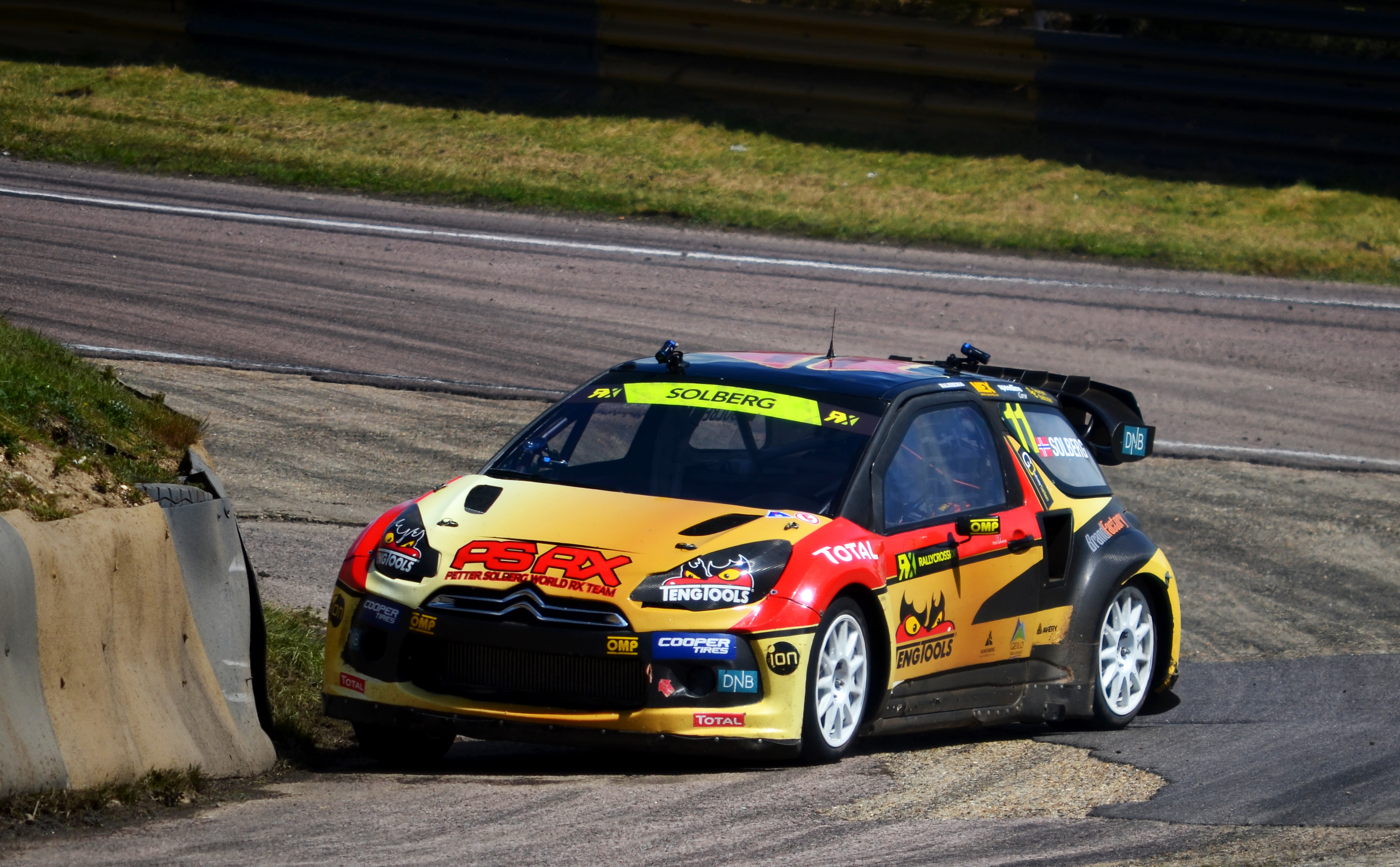
Solberg won the first FIA World Rallycross Championship with his PSRX Citroën DS3 Supercar.

=== ERX and WRX career ===
==== 2013 ====
In 2013, Solberg changed discipline, competing in all nine rounds of the FIA European Rallycross Championship (ERX) with his own team, based in Torsby. After a lot of bad luck, including retiring while leading in Finland, he eventually finished the season eighth overall in the Supercars category.

==== 2014 ====
In 2014, Solberg became the first ever FIA World Rallycross Champion (WRX) with his PSRX Citroën DS3 Supercar. Therefore, he is also the first driver ever to claim FIA World titles in two different motorsports.

==== 2015 ====
Solberg partnered with Liam Doran to compete for the Solberg Doran Rallycross (SDRX) team in the 2015 season. He successfully defended his WRX title with this Citroën DS3, clinching the title in the final round of the championship at Rosario in Argentina.

==== 2016 ====
In 2016, Solberg continued in the FIA World Rallycross Championship with a privateer Supercars class Citroën DS3. He won the first round at Portugal, and got three further podiums and a total of eight top-five finishes, finishing fourth in the overall standings.

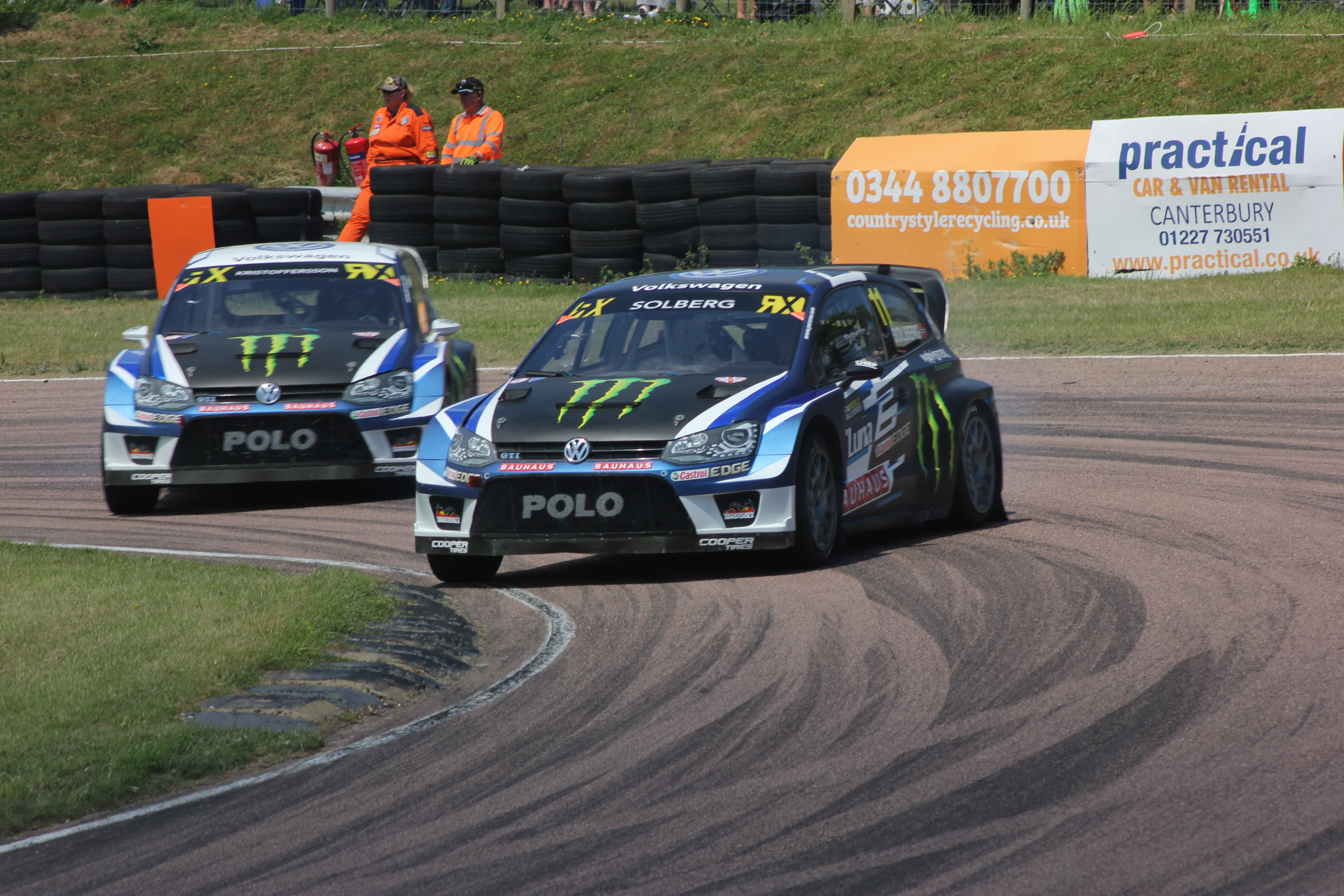
Petter Solberg leads Johan Kristoffersson at Lydden Hill RX 2017

==== 2017–2018 ====
2017 saw Solberg team up with Volkswagen Motorsport to create PSRX Volkswagen Sweden, driving the Polo GTi RX, and the team quickly became a dominant force in World RX. Solberg achieved his final World RX win at the legendary Lydden Hill in 2017, and by the end of the year, the team were crowned Team's Champions, Solberg finished third, and teammate Johan Kristoffersson won his first World Championship title.

In 2018, the team remained the same, albeit driving the rebranded Polo R, and for the second year running the team won the Team's Championship - this time in even more dominant fashion. Across 24 events in 2017 and 2018, PSRX won 19 of them – a level never before seen in the sport.

Solberg also made a brief rally comeback and took part in the 2018 Rally Catalunya to give the Volkswagen Polo R5 its WRC debut, and finished in a podium position with third place in the WRC2 category.

==== 2019–present ====
Solberg retired from full-time motorsport at the end of 2018, but did complete a 'Farewell Tour' in 2019 consisting of some of his favourite events. He set the fastest RX lap at the Goodwood Festival of Speed, set the lap record at the Norges Råeste Bakkeløp, won Gymkhana Grid and signed off from his WRC career with one final class win at the 2019 Wales Rally GB.

Since then, Solberg has been a constant and supportive presence in his son's life as Oliver Solberg followed in his father's footsteps and reached the World Rally Championship. In 2022, the Solbergs won the Race of Champions' Nations Cup for Team Norway.

=== Gymkhana Grid ===
Solberg won the AWD class of the 2016 Gymkhana Grid at Marathon with a Citroën Xsara. In 2018, he finished second at Johannesburg with a Volkswagen Polo. In 2019, he won the event at Warsaw, again driving a VW Polo.

== Personal life ==
Solberg was born in Askim, but grew up in Spydeberg. He is the younger brother to Henning Solberg. He is married to a Swede, Pernilla Solberg (née Walfridsson), with whom he has a son, Oliver Solberg, who is now a driver in the WRC himself. Pernilla is the daughter of former Volvo factory driver and 1980 European Rallycross Champion, Per-Inge "Pi" Walfridsson (who also claimed a remarkable fourth overall in the 1973 RAC Rally). Pernilla was also, for some time, one of the world's leading female rally drivers. Solberg lives with his family in Mitandersfors, Sweden.

Post-driving career, Solberg was diagnosed with ADHD.

== WRC victories ==
No.	Event	Season	Co-driver	Car
1	(United Kingdom) 58th Network Q Rally of Great Britain	2002	Phil Mills	Subaru Impreza WRC02
2	31st Cyprus Rally	2003	Phil Mills	Subaru Impreza WRC03
3	16th Telstra Rally Australia	2003	Phil Mills	Subaru Impreza WRC03
4	47ème Tour de Corse – Rallye de France	2003	Phil Mills	Subaru Impreza WRC03
5	(United Kingdom) 59th Wales Rally of Great Britain	2003	Phil Mills	Subaru Impreza WRC03
6	34th Propecia Rally New Zealand	2004	Phil Mills	Subaru Impreza WRC04
7	(Greece) 51st Acropolis Rally	2004	Phil Mills	Subaru Impreza WRC04
8	1st Rally Japan	2004	Phil Mills	Subaru Impreza WRC04
9	(United Kingdom) 60th Wales Rally of Great Britain	2004	Phil Mills	Subaru Impreza WRC04
10	(Italy) 1º Supermag Rally d'Italia Sardinia	2004	Phil Mills	Subaru Impreza WRC04
11	(Sweden) 54th Uddeholm Swedish Rally	2005	Phil Mills	Subaru Impreza WRC04
12	(Mexico) 19º Corona Rally México	2005	Phil Mills	Subaru Impreza WRC05
13	(United Kingdom) 61st Wales Rally of Great Britain	2005	Phil Mills	Subaru Impreza WRC05

== Racing record ==
=== Complete WRC results ===
(key)

Year	Entrant	Car	1	2	3	4	5	6	7	8	9	10	11	12	13	14	15	16	WDC	Points
1998	Shell Norge	Toyota Celica GT-Four ST205	MON	SWE; 16	KEN	POR	ESP	FRA	ARG	GRC	NZL	FIN	ITA	AUS					NC	0
1998	Petter Solberg	Toyota Celica GT-Four ST205													GBR; Ret				NC	0
1999	Ford Motor Co	Ford Escort WRC	MON	SWE; 11															19th	2
1999	Ford Motor Co	Ford Focus WRC			KEN; 5	POR; 11	ESP	FRA	ARG	GRC	NZL		CHN	ITA; 27	AUS	GBR; 9			19th	2
1999	Petter Solberg	Ford Focus WRC										FIN; 12							19th	2
2000	Ford Motor Co	Ford Focus RS WRC 00	MON	SWE	KEN; 5	POR; Ret	ESP	ARG; 6	GRC; Ret	NZL; 4	FIN; Ret	CYP							10th	6
2000	Petter Solberg	Subaru Impreza WRC2000											FRA; Ret	ITA; 9					10th	6
2000	Subaru World Rally Team	Subaru Impreza WRC2000													AUS; Ret	GBR; Ret			10th	6
2001	Subaru World Rally Team	Subaru Impreza WRC2001	MON; Ret	SWE; 6	POR; Ret	ESP; Ret	ARG; 5	CYP; Ret	GRE; 2	KEN; Ret	FIN; 7	NZL; 7	ITA; 9	FRA; 5	AUS; 7	GBR; Ret			10th	11
2002	555 Subaru World Rally Team	Subaru Impreza WRC2001	MON; 6	SWE; Ret															2nd	37
2002	555 Subaru World Rally Team	Subaru Impreza WRC2002			FRA; 5	ESP; 5	CYP; 5	ARG; 2	GRE; 5	KEN; Ret	FIN; 3	GER; Ret	ITA; 3	NZL; Ret	AUS; 3	GBR; 1			2nd	37
2003	555 Subaru World Rally Team	Subaru Impreza WRC2003	MON; Ret	SWE; 6	TUR; Ret	NZL; 3	ARG; 5	GRE; 3	CYP; 1	GER; 8	FIN; 2	AUS; 1	ITA; Ret	FRA; 1	ESP; 5	GBR; 1			1st	72
2004	555 Subaru World Rally Team	Subaru Impreza WRC2003	MON; 7	SWE; 3															2nd	82
2004	555 Subaru World Rally Team	Subaru Impreza WRC2004			MEX; 4	NZL; 1	CYP; 4	GRE; 1	TUR; 3	ARG; Ret	FIN; Ret	GER; Ret	JPN; 1	GBR; 1	ITA; 1	FRA; 5	ESP; 5	AUS; Ret	2nd	82
2005	Subaru World Rally Team	Subaru Impreza WRC2004	MON; Ret	SWE; 1															2nd	71
2005	Subaru World Rally Team	Subaru Impreza WRC2005			MEX; 1	NZL; 3	ITA; 2	CYP; Ret	TUR; 2	GRE; 9	ARG; 3	FIN; 4	GER; 7	GBR; 1	JPN; Ret	FRA; 3	ESP; 13	AUS; Ret	2nd	71
2006	Subaru World Rally Team	Subaru Impreza WRC2006	MON; Ret	SWE; DSQ	MEX; 2	ESP; 7	FRA; 11	ARG; 2	ITA; 9	GRE; 7	GER; Ret	FIN; Ret	JPN; 7	CYP; 8	TUR; 13	AUS; 2	NZL; 6	GBR; 3	6th	40
2007	Subaru World Rally Team	Subaru Impreza WRC2006	MON; 6	SWE; Ret	NOR; 4														5th	47
2007	Subaru World Rally Team	Subaru Impreza WRC2007				MEX; Ret	POR; 2	ARG; Ret	ITA; 5	GRE; 3	FIN; Ret	GER; 6	NZL; 7	ESP; 6	FRA; 5	JPN; 16	IRE; 5	GBR; 4	5th	47
2008	Subaru World Rally Team	Subaru Impreza WRC2007	MON; 5	SWE; 4	MEX; 11	ARG; Ret	JOR; Ret	ITA; 10											6th	46
2008	Subaru World Rally Team	Subaru Impreza WRC2008							GRE; 2	TUR; 6	FIN; 6	GER; 5	NZL; 4	ESP; 5	FRA; 5	JPN; 8	GBR; 4		6th	46
2009	Petter Solberg World Rally Team	Citroën Xsara WRC	IRL	NOR; 6	CYP; 3	POR; 4	ARG; Ret	ITA; 3	GRC; Ret	POL; 4	FIN; Ret	AUS							5th	35
2009	Petter Solberg World Rally Team	Citroën C4 WRC											ESP; 4						5th	35
2009	Citroën Junior Team	Citroën C4 WRC												GBR; 4					5th	35
2010	Petter Solberg World Rally Team	Citroën C4 WRC	SWE; 9	MEX; 2	JOR; 3	TUR; 2	NZL; Ret	POR; 5	BUL; 3	FIN; 4	GER; 5	JPN; 2	FRA; 3	ESP; 2	GBR; 2				3rd	169
2011	Petter Solberg World Rally Team	Citroën DS3 WRC	SWE; 5	MEX; 4	POR; 6	JOR; Ret	ITA; 3	ARG; 4	GRE; 4	FIN; 5	GER; 5	AUS; 3	FRA; DSQ	ESP; Ret	GBR; Ret				5th	110
2012	Ford World Rally Team	Ford Fiesta RS WRC	MON; 3	SWE; 4	MEX; 3	POR; 3	ARG; 6	GRE; Ret	NZL; 3	FIN; 4	GER; 11	GBR; 3	FRA; 26	ITA; 9	ESP; 11				5th	124
2018	Volkswagen Motorsport	Volkswagen Polo GTI R5	MON	SWE	MEX	FRA	ARG	POR	ITA	FIN	GER	TUR	GBR	ESP; 14	AUS				NC	0
2019	Petter Solberg	Volkswagen Polo GTI R5	MON	SWE	MEX	FRA	ARG	CHL	POR	ITA	FIN	GER	TUR	GBR; 10	ESP	AUS; C			32nd	1

=== WRC-2 results ===
(key)

Year	Entrant	Car	1	2	3	4	5	6	7	8	9	10	11	12	13	14	Pos.	Points
2018	Volkswagen Motorsport	Volkswagen Polo GTI R5	MON	SWE	MEX	FRA	ARG	POR	ITA	FIN	GER	TUR	GBR	ESP; 3	AUS		26th	15
2019	Petter Solberg	Volkswagen Polo GTI R5	MON	SWE	MEX	FRA	ARG	CHL	POR	ITA	FIN	GER	TUR	GBR; 1	ESP	AUS; C	21st	25

=== Complete IRC results ===
(key)

Year	Entrant	Car	1	2	3	4	5	6	7	8	9	10	11	12	IRC	Points
2011	Petter Solberg	Peugeot 207 S2000	MON; Ret	CAN	FRA	UKR	BEL	AZO	MAD	CZE	HUN	ITA	SCO	CYP	–	0

=== Complete FIA European Rallycross Championship results ===
(key)

==== Supercar ====
Year	Entrant	Car	1	2	3	4	5	6	7	8	9	ERX	Points
2013	PSRX	Citroën DS3	GBR; 10	POR; 3	HUN; 9	FIN; 5	NOR; 13	SWE; 6	FRA; 2	AUT; 6	GER; 6	8th	93

=== Complete FIA World Rallycross Championship results ===
(key)

==== Supercar ====
Year	Entrant	Car	1	2	3	4	5	6	7	8	9	10	11	12	13	WRX	Points
2014	PSRX	Citroën DS3	POR; 1	GBR; 6	NOR; 2	FIN; 10	SWE; 3	BEL; 3	CAN; 1	FRA; 1	GER; 1	ITA; 3	TUR; 6	ARG; 1		1st	267
2015	SDRX	Citroën DS3	POR; 2	HOC; 1	BEL; 2	GBR; 1	GER; 2	SWE; 6	CAN; 8	NOR; 7	FRA; 2	BAR; 1	TUR; 8	ITA; 3	ARG; 3	1st	301
2016	PSRX	Citroën DS3	POR; 1	HOC; 4	BEL; 3	GBR; 2	NOR; 4	SWE; 7	CAN; 5	FRA; 4	BAR; 10	LAT; 19	GER; 2	ARG; 7		4th	239
2017	PSRX Volkswagen Sweden	Volkswagen Polo GTI	BAR; 4	POR; 6	HOC; 4	BEL; 3	GBR; 1	NOR; 7	SWE; 7	CAN; 2	FRA; 5	LAT; 7	GER; 4	RSA; 4		3rd	252
2018	PSRX Volkswagen Sweden	Volkswagen Polo R	BAR; 5	POR; 3	BEL; 2	GBR; 7	NOR; 3	SWE; 7	CAN; 5	FRA; 3	LAT; 7	USA; 2	GER; 5	RSA; 5		5th	227

Awards
Preceded by Marcus Grönholm	Autosport; International Rally Driver Award; 2003	Succeeded by Sébastien Loeb
Preceded by Ole Einar Bjørndalen	Norwegian Sportsperson of the Year; 2003	Succeeded by Andreas Thorkildsen
Sporting positions
Preceded by Marcus Grönholm	World Rally Champion; 2003	Succeeded by Sébastien Loeb
Preceded by Inaugural	World Rallycross Champion; 2014-2015	Succeeded by Mattias Ekström
Preceded by Michael Schumacher; Sebastian Vettel (2012)	Race of Champions Nations' Cup; 2014; With: Tom Kristensen	Succeeded by Jason Plato; Andy Priaulx
Preceded by Tom Kristensen; Johan Kristoffersson (2019)	Race of Champions Nations' Cup; 2022-2023; With: Oliver Solberg	Succeeded by Incumbent
