= 2005 Monte Carlo Rally =

1st round of the 2005 World Rally Championship

2005 Monte Carlo Rally 73rd Rallye Automobile Monte-Carlo
Round 1 of the 2005 World Rally Championship season
Next event →
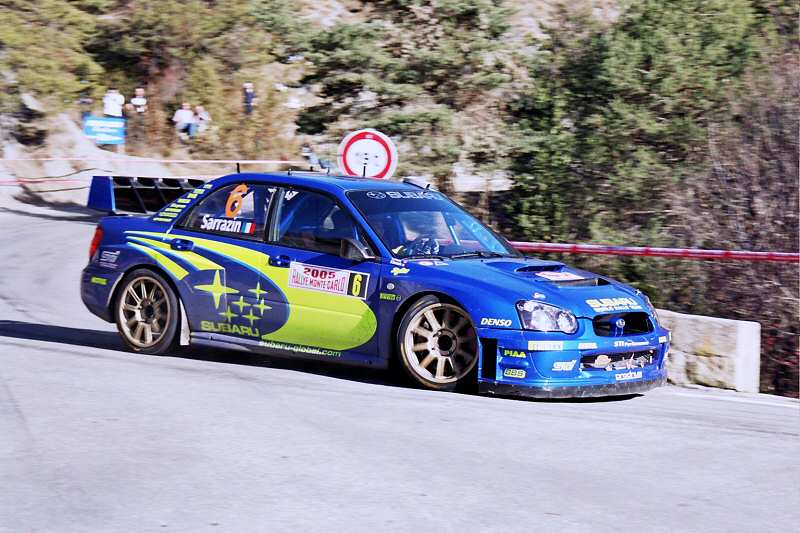
- Stéphane Sarrazin during one of the special stages.
- Host country: Monaco
- Rally base: Monaco
- Dates run: January 21, 2005 – January 23, 2005
- Stages: 15 (353.07 km; 219.39 miles)
- Stage surface: Asphalt/snow
- Overall distance: 1,360.13 km (845.15 miles)

Statistics
- Crews: 34 at start, 24 at finish

Overall results
- Overall winner: (France) Sébastien Loeb (Monaco) Daniel Elena (France) Citroën Total WRT; Citroën Xsara WRC

The 2005 Monte Carlo Rally (formally the 73rd Rallye Automobile Monte-Carlo) was the first round of the 2005 World Rally Championship. The rally was held over three days between 21 January and 23 January 2005, and was won by Citroën's Sébastien Loeb, his 11th win in the World Rally Championship.

== Background ==
=== Entry list ===
No.	Driver	Co-Driver	Entrant	Car	Tyre
World Rally Championship manufacturer entries
1	(France) Sébastien Loeb	(Monaco) Daniel Elena	(France) Citroën Total WRT	Citroën Xsara WRC	M
2	(Belgium) François Duval	(Belgium) Stéphane Prévot	(France) Citroën Total WRT	Citroën Xsara WRC	M
3	(Finland) Toni Gardemeister	(Finland) Jakke Honkanen	(United Kingdom) BP Ford World Rally Team	Ford Focus RS WRC '04	M
4	(Czech Republic) Roman Kresta	(Czech Republic) Jan Tománek	(United Kingdom) BP Ford World Rally Team	Ford Focus RS WRC '04	M
5	(Norway) Petter Solberg	(United Kingdom) Phil Mills	(Japan) Subaru World Rally Team	Subaru Impreza S10 WRC '04	P
6	(France) Stéphane Sarrazin	(France) Patrick Pivato	(Japan) Subaru World Rally Team	Subaru Impreza S10 WRC '04	P
7	(Finland) Marcus Grönholm	(Finland) Timo Rautiainen	(France) Marlboro Peugeot Total	Peugeot 307 WRC	P
8	(Estonia) Markko Märtin	(United Kingdom) Michael Park	(France) Marlboro Peugeot Total	Peugeot 307 WRC	P
9	(Finland) Harri Rovanperä	(Finland) Risto Pietiläinen	(Japan) Mitsubishi Motors	Mitsubishi Lancer WRC 05	P
10	(France) Gilles Panizzi	(France) Hervé Panizzi	(Japan) Mitsubishi Motors	Mitsubishi Lancer WRC 05	P
11	(Germany) Armin Schwarz	(Germany) Klaus Wicha	(Czech Republic) Škoda Motorsport	Škoda Fabia WRC	M
12	(France) Alexandre Bengué	(France) Caroline Escudero-Bengué	(Czech Republic) Škoda Motorsport	Škoda Fabia WRC	M
World Rally Championship entries
14	(Germany) Antony Warmbold	(Republic of Ireland) Damien Connolly	(United Kingdom) BP Ford World Rally Team	Ford Focus RS WRC '04	M
61	(France) Didier Auriol	(France) Denis Giraudet	(France) Didier Auriol	Peugeot 206 WRC	M
62	(Austria) Manfred Stohl	(Austria) Ilka Minor	(Belgium) OMV World Rally Team	Citroën Xsara WRC	M
63	(Spain) Xavier Pons	(Spain) Oriol Julià Pascual	(Spain) Xavier Pons	Peugeot 206 WRC	M
64	(Republic of Ireland) Eamonn Boland	(Republic of Ireland) Francis Regan	(Republic of Ireland) Eamonn Boland	Subaru Impreza S9 WRC '03	P
65	(Italy) Luca Rossetti	(Italy) Dario D'Esposito	(Italy) Luca Rossetti	Peugeot 206 WRC	P
66	(France) José Barbara	(France) Mireille Duthoit	(France) José Barbara	Subaru Impreza S5 WRC '98	K
67	(Italy) Riccardo Errani	(Italy) Stefano Casadio	(Italy) Riccardo Errani	Škoda Octavia WRC	M
JWRC entries
31	(Sweden) Per-Gunnar Andersson	(Sweden) Jonas Andersson	(Sweden) Per-Gunnar Andersson	Suzuki Ignis S1600	P
32	(United Kingdom) Guy Wilks	(United Kingdom) Phil Pugh	(United Kingdom) Guy Wilks	Suzuki Ignis S1600	P
33	(Finland) Kosti Katajamäki	(Finland) Timo Alanne	(Finland) Kosti Katajamäki	Suzuki Ignis S1600	P
34	(San Marino) Mirco Baldacci	(Italy) Giovanni Bernacchini	(San Marino) Mirco Baldacci	Fiat Punto S1600	P
35	(United Kingdom) Kris Meeke	(United Kingdom) Chris Patterson	(United Kingdom) Kris Meeke	Citroën C2 S1600	P
36	(Estonia) Urmo Aava	(Estonia) Kuldar Sikk	(Estonia) Urmo Aava	Suzuki Ignis S1600	P
37	(Italy) Alan Scorcioni	(San Marino) Silvio Stefanelli	(Italy) Alan Scorcioni	Suzuki Ignis S1600	P
38	(Italy) Luca Betti	(Italy) Giovanni Agnese	(Italy) Luca Betti	Renault Clio S1600	P
39	(Italy) Luca Cecchettini	(Italy) Massimo Daddoveri	(Italy) Luca Cecchettini	Renault Clio S1600	P
41	(Spain) Dani Sordo	(Spain) Marc Martí	(Spain) Dani Sordo	Citroën C2 S1600	P
42	(Czech Republic) Pavel Valoušek	(Italy) Pierangelo Scalvini	(Czech Republic) Pavel Valoušek	Suzuki Ignis S1600	P
43	(Czech Republic) Martin Prokop	(Czech Republic) Petr Gross	(Czech Republic) Martin Prokop	Suzuki Ignis S1600	P

=== Itinerary ===
All dates and times are CET (UTC+1).

Date	Time	No.	Stage name	Distance
1. leg — 108.51 km
21 January	08:35	SS1	Ilonse — Pierlas	22.93 km
21 January	09:50	SS2	St Antonin — Toudon	20.16 km
21 January	13:24	SS3	Lantosque — Col de Braus 1	32.71 km
21 January	16:44	SS4	Lantosque — Col de Braus 2	32.71 km
2. leg — 128.48 km
22 January	07:52	SS5	Col de Braus — Lantosque	32.62 km
22 January	11:47	SS6	Toudon — St Antonin 1	19.52 km
22 January	12:22	SS7	Pont des Miolans — Les Sausses 1	28.41 km
22 January	16:27	SS8	Toudon — St Antonin 2	19.52 km
22 January	17:02	SS9	Pont des Miolans — Les Sausses 1	28.41 km
3. leg — 116.08 km
23 January	07:47	SS10	Col de Braus — Col de l'Orme 1	7.33 km
23 January	08:11	SS11	La Cabanette — Lantosque 1	19.52 km
23 January	08:49	SS12	La Bollène Vésubie — Sospel 1	31.19 km
23 January	11:42	SS13	Col de Braus — Col de l'Orme 2	7.33 km
23 January	12:06	SS14	La Cabanette — Lantosque 2	19.52 km
23 January	12:44	SS15	La Bollène Vésubie — Sospel 2	31.19 km

== Results ==
=== Overall ===
Pos.	No.	Driver	Co-driver	Team	Car	Time	Difference	Points
1	1	(France) Sébastien Loeb	(Monaco) Daniel Elena	(France) Citroën Total WRT	Citroën Xsara WRC	4:13:05.6		10
2	3	(Finland) Toni Gardemeister	(Finland) Jakke Honkanen	(United Kingdom) BP Ford World Rally Team	Ford Focus RS WRC '04	4:16:03.9	+2:58.3	8
3	10	(France) Gilles Panizzi	(France) Hervé Panizzi	(Japan) Mitsubishi Motors	Mitsubishi Lancer WRC 05	4:16:45.7	+3:40.1	6
4	8	(Estonia) Markko Märtin	(United Kingdom) Michael Park	(France) Marlboro Peugeot Total	Peugeot 307 WRC	4:18:33.3	+5:27.7	5
5	7	(Finland) Marcus Grönholm	(Finland) Timo Rautiainen	(France) Marlboro Peugeot Total	Peugeot 307 WRC	4:20:39.4	+7:33.8	4
6	62	(Austria) Manfred Stohl	(Austria) Ilka Minor	(Belgium) OMV World Rally Team	Citroën Xsara WRC	4:21:14.5	+8:08.9	3
7	9	(Finland) Harri Rovanperä	(Finland) Risto Pietiläinen	(Japan) Mitsubishi Motors	Mitsubishi Lancer WRC 05	4:21:34.9	+8:29.3	2
8	4	(Czech Republic) Roman Kresta	(Czech Republic) Jan Tománek	(United Kingdom) BP Ford World Rally Team	Ford Focus RS WRC '04	4:22:23.7	+9:18.1	1

=== World Rally Cars ===
==== Classification ====
Position		No.	Driver	Co-driver	Entrant	Car	Time	Difference	Points
Event	Class	No.	Driver	Co-driver	Entrant	Car	Time	Difference	Points
1	1	1	(France) Sébastien Loeb	(Monaco) Daniel Elena	(France) Citroën Total WRT	Citroën Xsara WRC	4:13:05.6		10
2	2	3	(Finland) Toni Gardemeister	(Finland) Jakke Honkanen	(United Kingdom) BP Ford World Rally Team	Ford Focus RS WRC '04	4:16:03.9	+2:58.3	8
3	3	10	(France) Gilles Panizzi	(France) Hervé Panizzi	(Japan) Mitsubishi Motors	Mitsubishi Lancer WRC 05	4:16:45.7	+3:40.1	6
4	4	8	(Estonia) Markko Märtin	(United Kingdom) Michael Park	(France) Marlboro Peugeot Total	Peugeot 307 WRC	4:18:33.3	+5:27.7	5
5	5	7	(Finland) Marcus Grönholm	(Finland) Timo Rautiainen	(France) Marlboro Peugeot Total	Peugeot 307 WRC	4:20:39.4	+7:33.8	4
7	6	9	(Finland) Harri Rovanperä	(Finland) Risto Pietiläinen	(Japan) Mitsubishi Motors	Mitsubishi Lancer WRC 05	4:21:34.9	+8:29.3	2
8	7	4	(Czech Republic) Roman Kresta	(Czech Republic) Jan Tománek	(United Kingdom) BP Ford World Rally Team	Ford Focus RS WRC '04	4:22:23.7	+9:18.1	1
9	8	12	(France) Alexandre Bengué	(France) Caroline Escudero-Bengué	(Czech Republic) Škoda Motorsport	Škoda Fabia WRC	4:23:37.6	+10:32.0	0
14	9	6	(France) Stéphane Sarrazin	(France) Patrick Pivato	(Japan) Subaru World Rally Team	Subaru Impreza S10 WRC '04	4:37:42.8	+24:37.2	0
Retired SS12		5	(Norway) Petter Solberg	(United Kingdom) Phil Mills	(Japan) Subaru World Rally Team	Subaru Impreza S10 WRC '04	Accident		0
Retired SS7		11	(Germany) Armin Schwarz	(Germany) Klaus Wicha	(Czech Republic) Škoda Motorsport	Škoda Fabia WRC	Accident		0
Retired SS6		2	(Belgium) François Duval	(Belgium) Stéphane Prévot	(France) Citroën Total WRT	Citroën Xsara WRC	Accident		0

==== Special stages ====
Day	Stage	Stage name	Length	Winner	Car	Time	Class leaders
1. leg (21 Jan)	SS1	Ilonse — Pierlas	22.93 km	(France) Sébastien Loeb	Citroën Xsara WRC	17:18.6	(France) Sébastien Loeb
1. leg (21 Jan)	SS2	St Antonin — Toudon	20.16 km	(Finland) Marcus Grönholm	Peugeot 307 WRC	14:05.4	(France) Sébastien Loeb
1. leg (21 Jan)	SS3	Lantosque — Col de Braus 1	32.71 km	(France) Sébastien Loeb	Citroën Xsara WRC	23:44.8	(France) Sébastien Loeb
1. leg (21 Jan)	SS4	Lantosque — Col de Braus 2	32.71 km	(France) Sébastien Loeb	Citroën Xsara WRC	23:37.0	(France) Sébastien Loeb
2. leg (22 Jan)	SS5	Col de Braus — Lantosque	32.62 km	(France) Sébastien Loeb	Citroën Xsara WRC	24:08.1	(France) Sébastien Loeb
2. leg (22 Jan)	SS6	Toudon — St Antonin 1	19.52 km	Notional stage time			(France) Sébastien Loeb
2. leg (22 Jan)	SS7	Pont des Miolans — Les Sausses 1	28.41 km	Notional stage time			(France) Sébastien Loeb
2. leg (22 Jan)	SS8	Toudon — St Antonin 2	19.52 km	(France) Gilles Panizzi	Mitsubishi Lancer WRC 05	13:44.9	(France) Sébastien Loeb
2. leg (22 Jan)	SS9	Pont des Miolans — Les Sausses 1	28.41 km	(France) Sébastien Loeb	Citroën Xsara WRC	20:09.4	(France) Sébastien Loeb
3. leg (23 Jan)	SS10	Col de Braus — Col de l'Orme 1	7.33 km	(Norway) Petter Solberg	Subaru Impreza S10 WRC '04	5:40.8	(France) Sébastien Loeb
3. leg (23 Jan)	SS11	La Cabanette — Lantosque 1	19.52 km	(Norway) Petter Solberg	Subaru Impreza S10 WRC '04	13:36.1	(France) Sébastien Loeb
3. leg (23 Jan)	SS12	La Bollène Vésubie — Sospel 1	31.19 km	(Czech Republic) Roman Kresta	Ford Focus RS WRC '04	22:16.2	(France) Sébastien Loeb
3. leg (23 Jan)	SS13	Col de Braus — Col de l'Orme 2	7.33 km	(Finland) Marcus Grönholm	Peugeot 307 WRC	5:31.6	(France) Sébastien Loeb
3. leg (23 Jan)	SS14	La Cabanette — Lantosque 2	19.52 km	(France) Sébastien Loeb	Citroën Xsara WRC	13:31.5	(France) Sébastien Loeb
3. leg (23 Jan)	SS15	La Bollène Vésubie — Sospel 2	31.19 km	(France) Sébastien Loeb	Citroën Xsara WRC	21:40.4	(France) Sébastien Loeb

==== Championship standings ====
Pos.	Drivers' championships			Co-drivers' championships			Manufacturers' championships		
Pos.	Move	Driver	Points	Move	Co-driver	Points	Move	Manufacturer	Points
1	New entry	(France) Sébastien Loeb	10	New entry	(Monaco) Daniel Elena	10	New entry	(France) Citroën Total WRT	10
2	New entry	(Finland) Toni Gardemeister	8	New entry	(Finland) Jakke Honkanen	8	New entry	(United Kingdom) BP Ford World Rally Team	10
3	New entry	(France) Gilles Panizzi	6	New entry	(France) Hervé Panizzi	6	New entry	(Japan) Mitsubishi Motors	9
4	New entry	(Estonia) Markko Märtin	5	New entry	(United Kingdom) Michael Park	5	New entry	(France) Marlboro Peugeot Total	9
5	New entry	(Finland) Marcus Grönholm	4	New entry	(Finland) Timo Rautiainen	4	New entry	(Czech Republic) Škoda Motorsport	1

=== Junior World Rally Championship ===
==== Classification ====
Position		No.	Driver	Co-driver	Entrant	Car	Time	Difference	Points
Event	Class	No.	Driver	Co-driver	Entrant	Car	Time	Difference	Points
11	1	35	(United Kingdom) Kris Meeke	(United Kingdom) Chris Patterson	(United Kingdom) Kris Meeke	Citroën C2 S1600	4:35:55.6		10
12	2	33	(Finland) Kosti Katajamäki	(Finland) Timo Alanne	(Finland) Kosti Katajamäki	Suzuki Ignis S1600	4:36:10.1	+14.5	8
13	3	37	(Italy) Alan Scorcioni	(San Marino) Silvio Stefanelli	(Italy) Alan Scorcioni	Suzuki Ignis S1600	4:37:35.9	+1:40.3	6
15	4	41	(Spain) Dani Sordo	(Spain) Marc Martí	(Spain) Dani Sordo	Citroën C2 S1600	4:38:22.1	+2:26.5	5
16	5	38	(Italy) Luca Betti	(Italy) Giovanni Agnese	(Italy) Luca Betti	Renault Clio S1600	4:39:19.2	+3:23.6	4
18	6	31	(Sweden) Per-Gunnar Andersson	(Sweden) Jonas Andersson	(Sweden) Per-Gunnar Andersson	Suzuki Ignis S1600	4:39:55.8	+4:00.2	3
19	7	32	(United Kingdom) Guy Wilks	(United Kingdom) Phil Pugh	(United Kingdom) Guy Wilks	Suzuki Ignis S1600	4:40:46.9	+4:51.3	2
20	8	42	(Czech Republic) Pavel Valoušek	(Italy) Pierangelo Scalvini	(Czech Republic) Pavel Valoušek	Suzuki Ignis S1600	4:41:10.4	+5:14.8	1
21	9	43	(Czech Republic) Martin Prokop	(Czech Republic) Petr Gross	(Czech Republic) Martin Prokop	Suzuki Ignis S1600	4:44:54.0	+8:58.4	0
22	10	34	(San Marino) Mirco Baldacci	(Italy) Giovanni Bernacchini	(San Marino) Mirco Baldacci	Fiat Punto S1600	4:47:22.3	+11:26.7	0
Retired SS12		36	(Estonia) Urmo Aava	(Estonia) Kuldar Sikk	(Estonia) Urmo Aava	Suzuki Ignis S1600	Accident		0
Retired SS1		39	(Italy) Luca Cecchettini	(Italy) Massimo Daddoveri	(Italy) Luca Cecchettini	Renault Clio S1600	Accident		0

==== Special stages ====
Day	Stage	Stage name	Length	Winner	Car	Time	Class leaders
1. leg (21 Jan)	SS1	Ilonse — Pierlas	22.93 km	(Sweden) Per-Gunnar Andersson	Suzuki Ignis S1600	17:18.6	(Sweden) Per-Gunnar Andersson
1. leg (21 Jan)	SS2	St Antonin — Toudon	20.16 km	(San Marino) Mirco Baldacci	Fiat Punto S1600	14:05.4	(Sweden) Per-Gunnar Andersson
1. leg (21 Jan)	SS3	Lantosque — Col de Braus 1	32.71 km	(Spain) Dani Sordo	Citroën C2 S1600	23:44.8	(Sweden) Per-Gunnar Andersson
1. leg (21 Jan)	SS4	Lantosque — Col de Braus 2	32.71 km	(Sweden) Per-Gunnar Andersson	Suzuki Ignis S1600	23:37.0	(Sweden) Per-Gunnar Andersson
2. leg (22 Jan)	SS5	Col de Braus — Lantosque	32.62 km	(United Kingdom) Kris Meeke	Citroën C2 S1600	24:08.1	(Sweden) Per-Gunnar Andersson
2. leg (22 Jan)	SS6	Toudon — St Antonin 1	19.52 km	Notional stage time			(Sweden) Per-Gunnar Andersson
2. leg (22 Jan)	SS7	Pont des Miolans — Les Sausses 1	28.41 km	Notional stage time			(Sweden) Per-Gunnar Andersson
2. leg (22 Jan)	SS8	Toudon — St Antonin 2	19.52 km	(United Kingdom) Kris Meeke	Citroën C2 S1600	13:44.9	(Sweden) Per-Gunnar Andersson
2. leg (22 Jan)	SS9	Pont des Miolans — Les Sausses 1	28.41 km	(Spain) Dani Sordo	Citroën C2 S1600	20:09.4	(Finland) Kosti Katajamäki
3. leg (23 Jan)	SS10	Col de Braus — Col de l'Orme 1	7.33 km	(United Kingdom) Kris Meeke	Citroën C2 S1600	5:40.8	(Finland) Kosti Katajamäki
3. leg (23 Jan)	SS11	La Cabanette — Lantosque 1	19.52 km	(San Marino) Mirco Baldacci	Fiat Punto S1600	13:36.1	(Finland) Kosti Katajamäki
3. leg (23 Jan)	SS12	La Bollène Vésubie — Sospel 1	31.19 km	(San Marino) Mirco Baldacci	Fiat Punto S1600	22:16.2	(United Kingdom) Kris Meeke
3. leg (23 Jan)	SS13	Col de Braus — Col de l'Orme 2	7.33 km	(Sweden) Per-Gunnar Andersson	Suzuki Ignis S1600	5:31.6	(United Kingdom) Kris Meeke
3. leg (23 Jan)	SS14	La Cabanette — Lantosque 2	19.52 km	(United Kingdom) Kris Meeke	Citroën C2 S1600	13:31.5	(United Kingdom) Kris Meeke
3. leg (23 Jan)	SS15	La Bollène Vésubie — Sospel 2	31.19 km	(San Marino) Mirco Baldacci	Fiat Punto S1600	21:40.4	(United Kingdom) Kris Meeke

==== Championship standings ====
Pos.	Drivers' championships		
Pos.	Move	Driver	Points
1	New entry	(United Kingdom) Kris Meeke	10
2	New entry	(Finland) Kosti Katajamäki	8
3	New entry	(Italy) Alan Scorcioni	6
4	New entry	(Spain) Dani Sordo	5
5	New entry	(Italy) Luca Betti	4
