= 2003 Acropolis Rally =

6th round of the 2003 World Rally Championship

2003 Acropolis Rally 50th Golden Acropolis Rally
Round 6 of the 2003 World Rally Championship season
← Previous event	Next event →
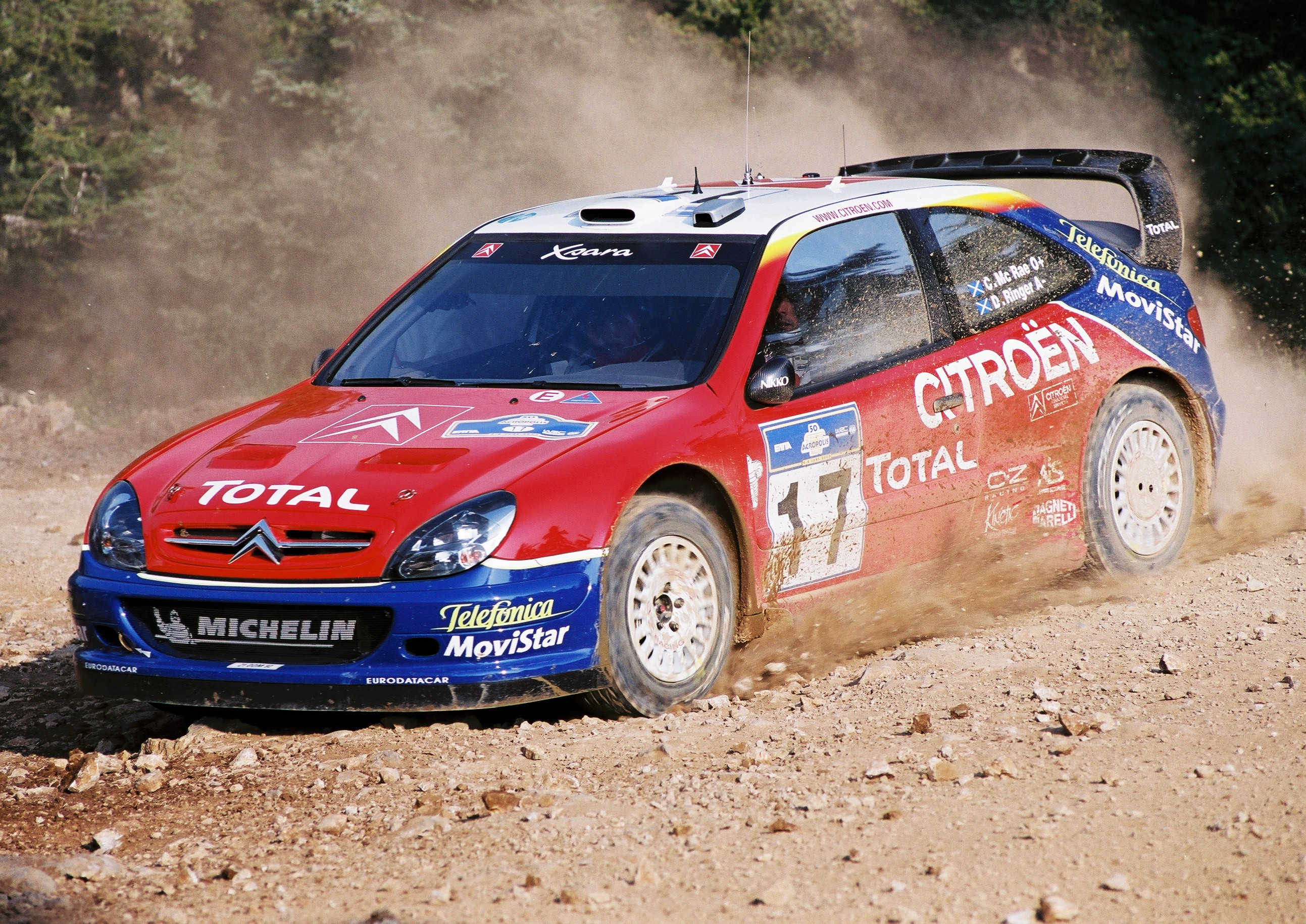
- Colin McRae and Derek Ringer's Citroen Xsara WRC
- Host country: Greece
- Rally base: Lamia
- Dates run: June 6, 2003 – June 8, 2003
- Stages: 22 (399.49 km; 248.23 miles)
- Stage surface: Gravel
- Overall distance: 1,441.37 km (895.63 miles)

Statistics
- Crews: 83 at start, 37 at finish

Overall results
- Overall winner: (Estonia) Markko Märtin (United Kingdom) Michael Park (United Kingdom) Ford Motor Co. Ltd. Ford Focus RS WRC '03

The 2003 Acropolis Rally (formally the 50th Golden Acropolis Rally) was the sixth round of the 2003 World Rally Championship. The race was held over three days between 6 June and 8 June 2003, and was based in Lamia, Greece. Ford's Markko Märtin won the race, his 1st win in the World Rally Championship.

== Background ==
=== Entry list ===
No.	Driver	Co-Driver	Entrant	Car	Tyre
World Rally Championship manufacturer entries
1	(Finland) Marcus Grönholm	(Finland) Timo Rautiainen	(France) Marlboro Peugeot Total	Peugeot 206 WRC	MI
2	(United Kingdom) Richard Burns	(United Kingdom) Robert Reid	(France) Marlboro Peugeot Total	Peugeot 206 WRC	MI
3	(Finland) Harri Rovanperä	(Finland) Risto Pietiläinen	(France) Marlboro Peugeot Total	Peugeot 206 WRC	MI
4	(Estonia) Markko Märtin	(United Kingdom) Michael Park	(United Kingdom) Ford Motor Co. Ltd.	Ford Focus RS WRC '03	MI
5	(Belgium) François Duval	(Belgium) Stéphane Prévot	(United Kingdom) Ford Motor Co. Ltd.	Ford Focus RS WRC '03	MI
6	(Finland) Mikko Hirvonen	(Finland) Jarmo Lehtinen	(United Kingdom) Ford Motor Co. Ltd.	Ford Focus RS WRC '02	MI
7	(Norway) Petter Solberg	(United Kingdom) Phil Mills	(Japan) 555 Subaru World Rally Team	Subaru Impreza S9 WRC '03	P
8	(Finland) Tommi Mäkinen	(Finland) Kaj Lindström	(Japan) 555 Subaru World Rally Team	Subaru Impreza S9 WRC '03	P
10	(Germany) Armin Schwarz	(Germany) Manfred Hiemer	(South Korea) Hyundai World Rally Team	Hyundai Accent WRC3	MI
11	(Belgium) Freddy Loix	(Belgium) Sven Smeets	(South Korea) Hyundai World Rally Team	Hyundai Accent WRC3	MI
12	(Finland) Jussi Välimäki	(Finland) Tero Gardemeister	(South Korea) Hyundai World Rally Team	Hyundai Accent WRC3	MI
14	(France) Didier Auriol	(France) Denis Giraudet	(Czech Republic) Škoda Motorsport	Škoda Octavia WRC Evo3	MI
15	(Finland) Toni Gardemeister	(Finland) Paavo Lukander	(Czech Republic) Škoda Motorsport	Škoda Octavia WRC Evo3	MI
17	(United Kingdom) Colin McRae	(United Kingdom) Derek Ringer	(France) Citroën Total WRT	Citroën Xsara WRC	MI
18	(France) Sébastien Loeb	(Monaco) Daniel Elena	(France) Citroën Total WRT	Citroën Xsara WRC	MI
19	(Spain) Carlos Sainz	(Spain) Marc Martí	(France) Citroën Total WRT	Citroën Xsara WRC	MI
World Rally Championship entries
20	(Finland) Jari-Matti Latvala	(United Kingdom) Carl Williamson	(United Kingdom) Ford Motor Co. Ltd.	Ford Focus RS WRC '02	MI
21	(France) Gilles Panizzi	(France) Hervé Panizzi	(France) Bozian Racing	Peugeot 206 WRC	MI
22	(Czech Republic) Roman Kresta	(Czech Republic) Miloš Hůlka	(France) Bozian Racing	Peugeot 206 WRC	MI
23	(Germany) Antony Warmbold	(United Kingdom) Gemma Price	(Germany) AW Rally Team	Ford Focus RS WRC '02	MI
24	(Finland) Juuso Pykälistö	(Finland) Esko Mertsalmi	(France) Bozian Racing	Peugeot 206 WRC	MI
25	(Spain) Daniel Solà	(Spain) Álex Romaní	(France) Citroën Sport	Citroën Xsara WRC	MI
26	(Austria) Manfred Stohl	(Austria) Ilka Minor	(Austria) Manfred Stohl	Hyundai Accent WRC3	MI
32	(United Kingdom) Alistair Ginley	(Republic of Ireland) Rory Kennedy	(United Kingdom) Alistair Ginley	Ford Focus RS WRC '01	—N/a
33	(Poland) Tomasz Kuchar	(Poland) Maciek Szczepaniak	(Poland) Tomasz Kuchar	Ford Focus RS WRC '02	MI
34	(Greece) Armodios Vovos	(Greece) Loris Meletopoulos	(Greece) Armodios Vovos	Ford Focus RS WRC '01	—N/a
35	(Greece) Ioannis Papadimitriou	(United Kingdom) Allan Harryman	(Greece) Ioannis Papadimitriou	Ford Focus RS WRC'01	P
101	(Slovakia) Jozef Béreš Jr.	(Czech Republic) Petr Starý	(Slovakia) Styllex Tuning Motorsport	Toyota Corolla WRC	—N/a
JWRC entries
51	(San Marino) Mirco Baldacci	(Italy) Giovanni Bernacchini	(Italy) Purity Auto	Fiat Punto S1600	MI
52	(Sweden) Daniel Carlsson	(Sweden) Matthias Andersson	(Japan) Suzuki Sport	Suzuki Ignis S1600	MI
54	(Finland) Kosti Katajamäki	(Finland) Miikka Anttila	(Germany) Volkswagen Racing	Volkswagen Polo S1600	MI
55	(Norway) Martin Stenshorne	(United Kingdom) Clive Jenkins	(United Kingdom) Ford Motor Co. Ltd.	Ford Puma S1600	MI
57	(Bulgaria) Dimitar Iliev	(Bulgaria) Petar Sivov	(Italy) Auto Sport Italia	Peugeot 206 S1600	MI
58	(Argentina) Marcos Ligato	(Argentina) Rubén García	(Italy) Top Run SRL	Fiat Punto S1600	MI
59	(Austria) Beppo Harrach	(Germany) Michael Kölbach	(Italy) Astra Racing	Ford Puma S1600	MI
61	(France) Brice Tirabassi	(France) Jacques-Julien Renucci	(France) Renault Sport	Renault Clio S1600	MI
62	(Sweden) Oscar Svedlund	(Sweden) Björn Nilsson	(Germany) Volkswagen Racing	Volkswagen Polo S1600	MI
63	(Italy) Massimo Ceccato	(Italy) Mitia Dotta	(Italy) Top Run SRL	Fiat Punto S1600	MI
64	(Finland) Ville-Pertti Teuronen	(Finland) Harri Kaapro	(Japan) Suzuki Sport	Suzuki Ignis S1600	MI
65	(Lebanon) Abdo Feghali	(Lebanon) Joseph Matar	(Italy) Astra Racing	Ford Puma S1600	MI
67	(San Marino) Alessandro Broccoli	(Italy) Simona Girelli	(San Marino) Sab Motorsport	Opel Corsa S1600	MI
69	(Spain) Salvador Cañellas Jr.	(Spain) Xavier Amigó	(Japan) Suzuki Sport	Suzuki Ignis S1600	MI
70	(United Kingdom) Guy Wilks	(United Kingdom) Phil Pugh	(United Kingdom) Ford Motor Co. Ltd.	Ford Puma S1600	MI
71	(Estonia) Urmo Aava	(Estonia) Kuldar Sikk	(Japan) Suzuki Sport	Suzuki Ignis S1600	MI
73	(Bulgaria) Krum Donchev	(Bulgaria) Ruman Manolov	(Italy) Auto Sport Italia	Opel Corsa S1600	MI
74	(United Kingdom) Kris Meeke	(United Kingdom) Chris Patterson	(Germany) Opel Motorsport	Opel Corsa S1600	MI
76	(Italy) Luca Cecchettini	(Italy) Marco Muzzarelli	(Italy) Top Run SRL	Fiat Punto S1600	MI
78	(Germany) Vladan Vasiljevic	(Germany) Sebastian Geipel	(Germany) Volkswagen Racing	Volkswagen Polo S1600	MI

=== Itinerary ===
All dates and times are EEST (UTC+3).

Date	Time	No.	Stage name	Distance
Leg 1 — 145.74 km
6 June	08:18	SS1	Pavliani 1	24.45 km
6 June	09:07	SS2	Stromi 1	14.61 km
6 June	10:10	SS3	Eleftherohori	18.67 km
6 June	12:18	SS4	Rengini 1	11.84 km
6 June	12:46	SS5	Elatia — Zeli 1	34.68 km
6 June	15:37	SS6	Pavliani 2	24.45 km
6 June	16:26	SS7	Stromi 2	14.61 km
6 June	18:01	SS8	SSS Lilea — Parnassos 1	2.43 km
Leg 2 — 148.71 km
7 June	06:56	SS9	Mendenitsa	17.34 km
7 June	08:21	SS10	Bauxites 1	23.45 km
7 June	09:44	SS11	Drosohori 1	17.76 km
7 June	12:17	SS12	Rengini 2	11.84 km
7 June	12:45	SS13	Elatia — Zeli 2	34.68 km
7 June	16:03	SS14	Bauxites 2	23.45 km
7 June	17:26	SS15	Drosohori 2	17.76 km
7 June	18:18	SS16	SSS Lilea — Parnassos 2	2.43 km
Leg 3 — 105.04 km
8 June	09:28	SS17	Dikastro 1	18.40 km
8 June	10:06	SS18	New Tarzan 1	20.65 km
8 June	11:04	SS19	Agios Stefanos 1	13.47 km
8 June	13:32	SS20	Dikastro 2	18.40 km
8 June	14:10	SS21	New Tarzan 2	20.65 km
8 June	15:08	SS22	Agios Stefanos 2	13.47 km

== Results ==
=== Overall ===
Pos.	No.	Driver	Co-driver	Team	Car	Time	Difference	Points
1	4	(Estonia) Markko Märtin	(United Kingdom) Michael Park	(United Kingdom) Ford Motor Co. Ltd.	Ford Focus RS WRC '03	4:53:40.5		10
2	19	(Spain) Carlos Sainz	(Spain) Marc Martí	(France) Citroën Total WRT	Citroën Xsara WRC	4:54:26.5	+46.0	8
3	7	(Norway) Petter Solberg	(United Kingdom) Phil Mills	(Japan) 555 Subaru World Rally Team	Subaru Impreza S9 WRC '03	4:54:33.2	+52.7	6
4	2	(United Kingdom) Richard Burns	(United Kingdom) Robert Reid	(France) Marlboro Peugeot Total	Peugeot 206 WRC	4:55:47.1	+2:06.6	5
5	8	(Finland) Tommi Mäkinen	(Finland) Kaj Lindström	(Japan) 555 Subaru World Rally Team	Subaru Impreza S9 WRC '03	4:55:52.8	+2:12.3	4
6	3	(Finland) Harri Rovanperä	(Finland) Risto Pietiläinen	(France) Marlboro Peugeot Total	Peugeot 206 WRC	4:57:25.2	+3:44.7	3
7	21	(France) Gilles Panizzi	(France) Hervé Panizzi	(France) Bozian Racing	Peugeot 206 WRC	4:57:34.8	+3:54.3	2
8	17	(United Kingdom) Colin McRae	(United Kingdom) Derek Ringer	(France) Citroën Total WRT	Citroën Xsara WRC	4:57:45.5	+4:05.0	1

=== World Rally Cars ===
==== Classification ====
Position		No.	Driver	Co-driver	Entrant	Car	Time	Difference	Points
Event	Class	No.	Driver	Co-driver	Entrant	Car	Time	Difference	Points
1	1	4	(Estonia) Markko Märtin	(United Kingdom) Michael Park	(United Kingdom) Ford Motor Co. Ltd.	Ford Focus RS WRC '03	4:53:40.5		10
2	2	19	(Spain) Carlos Sainz	(Spain) Marc Martí	(France) Citroën Total WRT	Citroën Xsara WRC	4:54:26.5	+46.0	8
3	3	7	(Norway) Petter Solberg	(United Kingdom) Phil Mills	(Japan) 555 Subaru World Rally Team	Subaru Impreza S9 WRC '03	4:54:33.2	+52.7	6
4	4	2	(United Kingdom) Richard Burns	(United Kingdom) Robert Reid	(France) Marlboro Peugeot Total	Peugeot 206 WRC	4:55:47.1	+2:06.6	5
5	5	8	(Finland) Tommi Mäkinen	(Finland) Kaj Lindström	(Japan) 555 Subaru World Rally Team	Subaru Impreza S9 WRC '03	4:55:52.8	+2:12.3	4
6	6	3	(Finland) Harri Rovanperä	(Finland) Risto Pietiläinen	(France) Marlboro Peugeot Total	Peugeot 206 WRC	4:57:25.2	+3:44.7	3
8	7	17	(United Kingdom) Colin McRae	(United Kingdom) Derek Ringer	(France) Citroën Total WRT	Citroën Xsara WRC	4:57:45.5	+4:05.0	1
9	8	14	(France) Didier Auriol	(France) Denis Giraudet	(Czech Republic) Škoda Motorsport	Škoda Octavia WRC Evo3	5:00:07.7	+6:27.2	0
Retired SS9		1	(Finland) Marcus Grönholm	(Finland) Timo Rautiainen	(France) Marlboro Peugeot Total	Peugeot 206 WRC	Fuel pump		0
Retired SS9		12	(Finland) Jussi Välimäki	(Finland) Tero Gardemeister	(South Korea) Hyundai World Rally Team	Hyundai Accent WRC3	Clutch		0
Retired SS6		6	(Finland) Mikko Hirvonen	(Finland) Jarmo Lehtinen	(United Kingdom) Ford Motor Co. Ltd.	Ford Focus RS WRC '02	Suspension		0
Retired SS6		15	(Finland) Toni Gardemeister	(Finland) Paavo Lukander	(Czech Republic) Škoda Motorsport	Škoda Octavia WRC Evo3	Turbo		0
Retired SS5		5	(Belgium) François Duval	(Belgium) Stéphane Prévot	(United Kingdom) Ford Motor Co. Ltd.	Ford Focus RS WRC '03	Accident		0
Retired SS3		11	(Belgium) Freddy Loix	(Belgium) Sven Smeets	(South Korea) Hyundai World Rally Team	Hyundai Accent WRC3	Suspension		0
Retired SS1		10	(Germany) Armin Schwarz	(Germany) Manfred Hiemer	(South Korea) Hyundai World Rally Team	Hyundai Accent WRC3	Alternator		0
Retired SS1		18	(France) Sébastien Loeb	(Monaco) Daniel Elena	(France) Citroën Total WRT	Citroën Xsara WRC	Engine		0

==== Special stages ====
Day	Stage	Stage name	Length	Winner	Car	Time	Class leaders
Leg 1 (6 Jun)	SS1	Pavliani 1	24.45 km	(Belgium) François Duval	Ford Focus RS WRC '03	19:54.7	(Belgium) François Duval
Leg 1 (6 Jun)	SS2	Stromi 1	14.61 km	(Estonia) Markko Märtin	Ford Focus RS WRC '03	11:40.2	(Estonia) Markko Märtin
Leg 1 (6 Jun)	SS3	Eleftherohori	18.67 km	(Finland) Harri Rovanperä	Peugeot 206 WRC	11:28.2	(Estonia) Markko Märtin
Leg 1 (6 Jun)	SS4	Rengini 1	11.84 km	(Finland) Harri Rovanperä	Peugeot 206 WRC	8:41.8	(Estonia) Markko Märtin
Leg 1 (6 Jun)	SS5	Elatia — Zeli 1	34.68 km	(Finland) Harri Rovanperä	Peugeot 206 WRC	24:21.9	(Estonia) Markko Märtin
Leg 1 (6 Jun)	SS6	Pavliani 2	24.45 km	(Norway) Petter Solberg	Subaru Impreza S9 WRC '03	19:29.5	(Estonia) Markko Märtin
Leg 1 (6 Jun)	SS7	Stromi 2	14.61 km	(Finland) Marcus Grönholm	Peugeot 206 WRC	11:25.6	(Estonia) Markko Märtin
Leg 1 (6 Jun)	SS8	SSS Lilea — Parnassos 1	2.43 km	Stage cancelled			(Estonia) Markko Märtin
Leg 2 (7 Jun)	SS9	Mendenitsa	17.34 km	(Norway) Petter Solberg	Subaru Impreza S9 WRC '03	10:55.0	(Estonia) Markko Märtin
Leg 2 (7 Jun)	SS10	Bauxites 1	23.45 km	(Norway) Petter Solberg	Subaru Impreza S9 WRC '03	14:14.8	(Estonia) Markko Märtin
Leg 2 (7 Jun)	SS11	Drosohori 1	17.76 km	(Estonia) Markko Märtin	Ford Focus RS WRC '03	14:48.6	(Estonia) Markko Märtin
Leg 2 (7 Jun)	SS12	Rengini 2	11.84 km	(Finland) Harri Rovanperä	Peugeot 206 WRC	8:30.2	(Estonia) Markko Märtin
Leg 2 (7 Jun)	SS13	Elatia — Zeli 2	34.68 km	(Estonia) Markko Märtin	Ford Focus RS WRC '03	23:44.2	(Estonia) Markko Märtin
Leg 2 (7 Jun)	SS14	Bauxites 2	23.45 km	(Estonia) Markko Märtin	Ford Focus RS WRC '03	13:51.9	(Estonia) Markko Märtin
Leg 2 (7 Jun)	SS15	Drosohori 2	17.76 km	(Estonia) Markko Märtin	Ford Focus RS WRC '03	14:23.6	(Estonia) Markko Märtin
Leg 2 (7 Jun)	SS16	SSS Lilea — Parnassos 2	2.43 km	(Spain) Carlos Sainz	Citroën Xsara WRC	1:57.6	(Estonia) Markko Märtin
Leg 3 (8 Jun)	SS17	Dikastro 1	18.40 km	(Norway) Petter Solberg	Subaru Impreza S9 WRC '03	16:08.7	(Estonia) Markko Märtin
Leg 3 (8 Jun)	SS18	New Tarzan 1	20.65 km	(Norway) Petter Solberg	Subaru Impreza S9 WRC '03	15:27.8	(Estonia) Markko Märtin
Leg 3 (8 Jun)	SS19	Agios Stefanos 1	13.47 km	(Finland) Tommi Mäkinen	Subaru Impreza S9 WRC '03	10:02.6	(Estonia) Markko Märtin
Leg 3 (8 Jun)	SS20	Dikastro 2	18.40 km	(Norway) Petter Solberg	Subaru Impreza S9 WRC '03	15:58.3	(Estonia) Markko Märtin
Leg 3 (8 Jun)	SS21	New Tarzan 2	20.65 km	(Spain) Carlos Sainz	Citroën Xsara WRC	15:10.3	(Estonia) Markko Märtin
Leg 3 (8 Jun)	SS22	Agios Stefanos 2	13.47 km	(Norway) Petter Solberg	Subaru Impreza S9 WRC '03	9:46.7	(Estonia) Markko Märtin

==== Championship standings ====
Pos.	Drivers' championships			Co-drivers' championships			Manufacturers' championships		
Pos.	Move	Driver	Points	Move	Co-driver	Points	Move	Manufacturer	Points
1		(United Kingdom) Richard Burns	37		(United Kingdom) Robert Reid	37		(France) Marlboro Peugeot Total	73
2	2	(Spain) Carlos Sainz	32	2	(Spain) Marc Martí	32		(France) Citroën Total WRT	62
3	1	(Finland) Marcus Grönholm	30	1	(Finland) Timo Rautiainen	30		(United Kingdom) Ford Motor Co. Ltd.	39
4	2	(Estonia) Markko Märtin	23	2	(United Kingdom) Michael Park	23		(Japan) 555 Subaru World Rally Team	37
5	1	(Norway) Petter Solberg	19	1	(United Kingdom) Phil Mills	19		(Czech Republic) Škoda Motorsport	20

=== Junior World Rally Championship ===
==== Classification ====
Position		No.	Driver	Co-driver	Entrant	Car	Time	Difference	Points
Event	Class	No.	Driver	Co-driver	Entrant	Car	Time	Difference	Points
17	1	61	(France) Brice Tirabassi	(France) Jacques-Julien Renucci	(France) Renault Sport	Renault Clio S1600	5:27:34.0		10
18	2	52	(Sweden) Daniel Carlsson	(Sweden) Matthias Andersson	(Japan) Suzuki Sport	Suzuki Ignis S1600	5:28:29.2	+55.2	8
19	3	71	(Estonia) Urmo Aava	(Estonia) Kuldar Sikk	(Japan) Suzuki Sport	Suzuki Ignis S1600	5:35:02.7	+7:28.7	6
22	4	69	(Spain) Salvador Cañellas Jr.	(Spain) Xavier Amigó	(Japan) Suzuki Sport	Suzuki Ignis S1600	5:40:55.2	+13:21.2	5
27	5	62	(Sweden) Oscar Svedlund	(Sweden) Björn Nilsson	(Germany) Volkswagen Racing	Volkswagen Polo S1600	5:49:22.1	+21:48.1	4
33	6	70	(United Kingdom) Guy Wilks	(United Kingdom) Phil Pugh	(United Kingdom) Ford Motor Co. Ltd.	Ford Puma S1600	6:04:08.1	+36:34.1	3
Retired SS21		51	(San Marino) Mirco Baldacci	(Italy) Giovanni Bernacchini	(Italy) Purity Auto	Fiat Punto S1600	Mechanical		0
Retired SS17		63	(Italy) Massimo Ceccato	(Italy) Mitia Dotta	(Italy) Top Run SRL	Fiat Punto S1600	Engine		0
Retired SS17		76	(Italy) Luca Cecchettini	(Italy) Marco Muzzarelli	(Italy) Top Run SRL	Fiat Punto S1600	Engine		0
Retired SS11		54	(Finland) Kosti Katajamäki	(Finland) Miikka Anttila	(Germany) Volkswagen Racing	Volkswagen Polo S1600	Gearbox		0
Retired SS11		67	(San Marino) Alessandro Broccoli	(Italy) Simona Girelli	(San Marino) Sab Motorsport	Opel Corsa S1600	Driveshaft		0
Retired SS10		55	(Norway) Martin Stenshorne	(United Kingdom) Clive Jenkins	(United Kingdom) Ford Motor Co. Ltd.	Ford Puma S1600	Alternator		0
Retired SS7		64	(Finland) Ville-Pertti Teuronen	(Finland) Harri Kaapro	(Japan) Suzuki Sport	Suzuki Ignis S1600	Driveshaft		0
Retired SS5		57	(Bulgaria) Dimitar Iliev	(Bulgaria) Petar Sivov	(Italy) Auto Sport Italia	Peugeot 206 S1600	Engine		0
Retired SS5		73	(Bulgaria) Krum Donchev	(Bulgaria) Ruman Manolov	(Italy) Auto Sport Italia	Opel Corsa S1600	Lost wheel		0
Retired SS4		65	(Lebanon) Abdo Feghali	(Lebanon) Joseph Matar	(Italy) Astra Racing	Ford Puma S1600	Engine		0
Retired SS2		59	(Austria) Beppo Harrach	(Germany) Michael Kölbach	(Italy) Astra Racing	Ford Puma S1600	Lost wheel		0
Retired SS1		58	(Argentina) Marcos Ligato	(Argentina) Rubén García	(Italy) Top Run SRL	Fiat Punto S1600	Steering		0
Retired SS1		74	(United Kingdom) Kris Meeke	(United Kingdom) Chris Patterson	(Germany) Opel Motorsport	Opel Corsa S1600	Steering		0
Retired SS1		78	(Germany) Vladan Vasiljevic	(Germany) Sebastian Geipel	(Germany) Volkswagen Racing	Volkswagen Polo S1600	Accident		0

==== Special stages ====
Day	Stage	Stage name	Length	Winner	Car	Time	Class leaders
Leg 1 (6 Jun)	SS1	Pavliani 1	24.45 km	(France) Brice Tirabassi	Renault Clio S1600	21:50.4	(France) Brice Tirabassi
Leg 1 (6 Jun)	SS2	Stromi 1	14.61 km	(Sweden) Daniel Carlsson	Suzuki Ignis S1600	12:57.0	(France) Brice Tirabassi
Leg 1 (6 Jun)	SS3	Eleftherohori	18.67 km	(Sweden) Daniel Carlsson	Suzuki Ignis S1600	12:45.3	(France) Brice Tirabassi
Leg 1 (6 Jun)	SS4	Rengini 1	11.84 km	(France) Brice Tirabassi	Renault Clio S1600	9:52.4	(France) Brice Tirabassi
Leg 1 (6 Jun)	SS5	Elatia — Zeli 1	34.68 km	(France) Brice Tirabassi	Renault Clio S1600	27:17.5	(France) Brice Tirabassi
Leg 1 (6 Jun)	SS6	Pavliani 2	24.45 km	(France) Brice Tirabassi	Renault Clio S1600	21:36.6	(France) Brice Tirabassi
Leg 1 (6 Jun)	SS7	Stromi 2	14.61 km	(France) Brice Tirabassi	Renault Clio S1600	12:47.5	(France) Brice Tirabassi
Leg 1 (6 Jun)	SS8	SSS Lilea — Parnassos 1	2.43 km	Stage cancelled			(France) Brice Tirabassi
Leg 2 (7 Jun)	SS9	Mendenitsa	17.34 km	(France) Brice Tirabassi	Renault Clio S1600	12:30.5	(France) Brice Tirabassi
Leg 2 (7 Jun)	SS10	Bauxites 1	23.45 km	(France) Brice Tirabassi	Renault Clio S1600	16:01.7	(France) Brice Tirabassi
Leg 2 (7 Jun)	SS11	Drosohori 1	17.76 km	(France) Brice Tirabassi	Renault Clio S1600	16:28.7	(France) Brice Tirabassi
Leg 2 (7 Jun)	SS12	Rengini 2	11.84 km	(France) Brice Tirabassi	Renault Clio S1600	9:45.0	(France) Brice Tirabassi
Leg 2 (7 Jun)	SS13	Elatia — Zeli 2	34.68 km	(Sweden) Daniel Carlsson	Suzuki Ignis S1600	27:04.4	(France) Brice Tirabassi
Leg 2 (7 Jun)	SS14	Bauxites 2	23.45 km	(Sweden) Daniel Carlsson	Suzuki Ignis S1600	15:39.6	(France) Brice Tirabassi
Leg 2 (7 Jun)	SS15	Drosohori 2	17.76	(France) Brice Tirabassi	Renault Clio S1600	16:05.3	(France) Brice Tirabassi
Leg 2 (7 Jun)	SS16	SSS Lilea — Parnassos 2	2.43 km	(Sweden) Daniel Carlsson	Suzuki Ignis S1600	2:08.9	(France) Brice Tirabassi
Leg 3 (8 Jun)	SS17	Dikastro 1	18.40 km	(France) Brice Tirabassi	Renault Clio S1600	17:59.8	(France) Brice Tirabassi
Leg 3 (8 Jun)	SS18	New Tarzan 1	20.65 km	(Sweden) Daniel Carlsson	Suzuki Ignis S1600	16:58.0	(France) Brice Tirabassi
Leg 3 (8 Jun)	SS19	Agios Stefanos 1	13.47 km	(France) Brice Tirabassi	Renault Clio S1600	11:04.8	(France) Brice Tirabassi
Leg 3 (8 Jun)	SS20	Dikastro 2	18.40 km	(France) Brice Tirabassi	Renault Clio S1600	17:47.0	(France) Brice Tirabassi
Leg 3 (8 Jun)	SS21	New Tarzan 2	20.65 km	(Sweden) Daniel Carlsson	Suzuki Ignis S1600	16:51.6	(France) Brice Tirabassi
Leg 3 (8 Jun)	SS22	Agios Stefanos 2	13.47 km	(Sweden) Daniel Carlsson	Suzuki Ignis S1600	10:56.4	(France) Brice Tirabassi

==== Championship standings ====
Pos.	Drivers' championships		
Pos.	Move	Driver	Points
1		(France) Brice Tirabassi	20
2	2	(Spain) Salvador Cañellas Jr.	13
3	4	(Estonia) Urmo Aava	11
4	2	(Finland) Kosti Katajamäki	10
5	1	(United Kingdom) Guy Wilks	9
