= Chris Patterson (co-driver) =

British-Irish rally co-driver (born 1968)

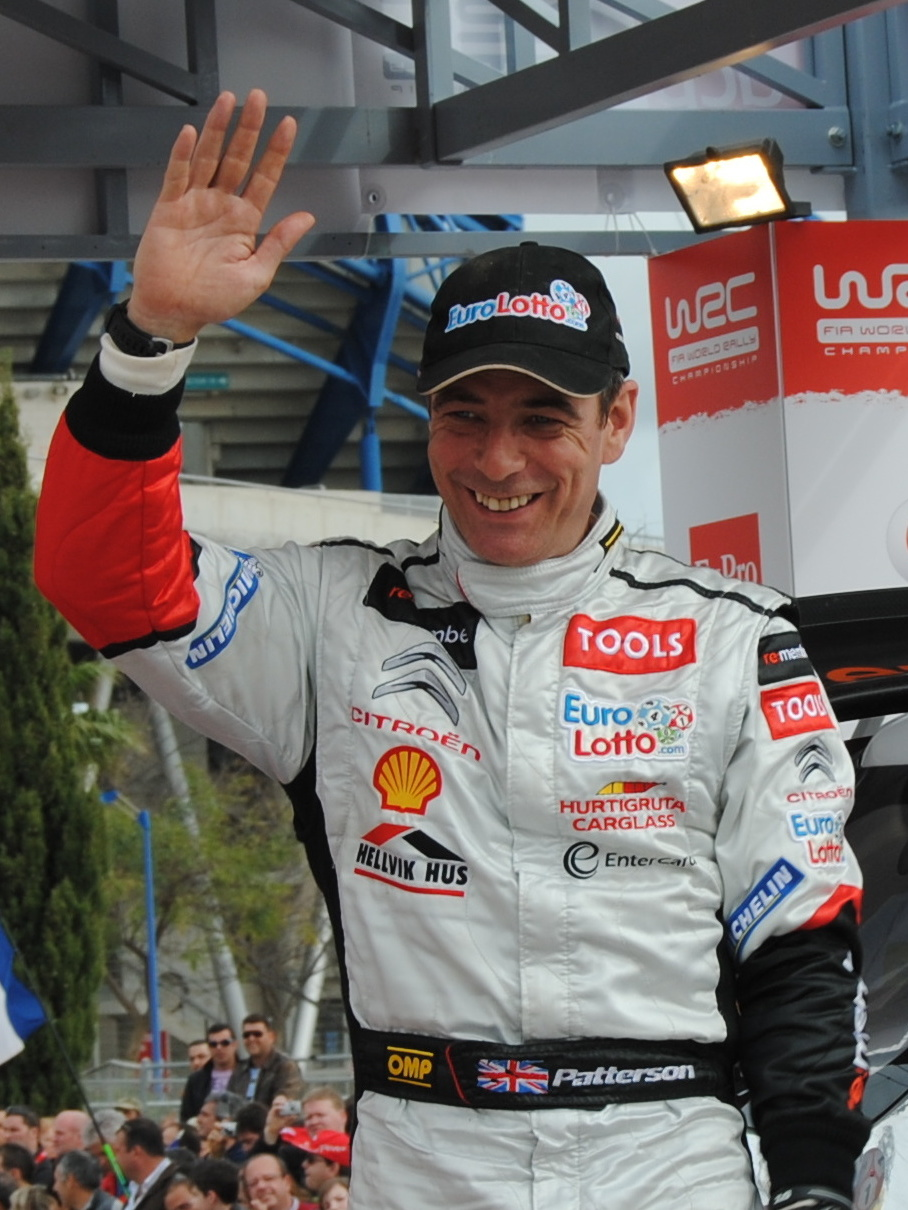
- Chris Patterson at 2011 Rally de Portugal

Personal information
- Nationality: (United Kingdom) British (Republic of Ireland) Irish
- Born: 6 September 1968 (age 58)

World Rally Championship record
- Years active: 1993, 1997–2018, 2021
- Driver: (United Kingdom) Mike Rimmer (United Kingdom) Nigel Heath (United Kingdom) Alister McRae (United Kingdom) David Higgins (Greece) Ioannis Papadimitriou (United Kingdom) Natalie Barratt (United Kingdom) Gwyndaf Evans (United Kingdom) Kris Meeke (United Kingdom) Niall McShea (Qatar) Nasser Al-Attiyah (Cyprus) Spyros Pavlides (United Kingdom) David Senior (Norway) Petter Solberg (Czech Republic) Tomáš Kostka (Poland) Michał Sołowow (United Arab Emirates) Khalid Al Qassimi (United Kingdom) Gus Greensmith
- Teams: Citroën, M-Sport Ford
- Rallies: 144
- Championships: 0
- Rally wins: 0
- Podiums: 12
- Stage wins: 104
- First rally: 1993 Rally Catalunya
- Last rally: 2021 Rally Catalunya

Chris Patterson (born 6 September 1968) is a British-Irish former rally co-driver.

== Career ==
Patterson competed first time in the World Rally Championship (WRC) in 1993 and has won the 2006 Production World Rally Championship with Nasser Al-Attiyah. Patterson is recognised as one of the world's most experienced rally navigators. On 29 June 2010, he joined Petter Solberg World Rally Team to replace Solberg's retired co-driver Phil Mills.

After Solberg switched to rallycross in 2013, Patterson was co-driving fellow Irishman Kris Meeke on a Citroën DS3 WRC in Rally Finland. They were running in fifth place on Meeke's WRC return before rolling in the final section of the penultimate stage of the rally. They also teamed up for Rally Australia, but again retired. In 2014, Patterson became Khalid Al Qassimi's co-driver, a partnership that lasted until 2016. He subsequently retired from the WRC in 2018.

Patterson returned to the championship with Gus Greensmith, driving for M-Sport Ford under the Irish tricolour. He retired from professional co-driving after Rally Spain in October 2021, ending his partnership with Greensmith.

== Complete rally results ==
=== Complete WRC results ===
Year	Entrant	Car	1	2	3	4	5	6	7	8	9	10	11	12	13	14	15	16	WDC	Points
1993	Mike Rimmer	Subaru Legacy RS	MON	SWE	POR	KEN	FRA	GRE	ARG	NZL	FIN	AUS	ITA	ESP; Ret	GBR; 17				NC	0
1997	Nigel Heath	Ford Escort RS Cosworth	MON	SWE	KEN	POR	ESP	FRA	ARG	GRC	NZL	FIN; 39	IDN	ITA	AUS	GBR			NC	0
1998	Nigel Heath	Subaru Impreza WRX	MON	SWE	KEN	POR; 35	ESP												NC	0
1998	Hyundai Motor Sport	Hyundai Coupé Kit Car						FRA; 15	ARG	GRE	NZL	FIN	ITA	AUS	GBR				NC	0
1999	Nigel Heath	Subaru Impreza WRX	MON; Ret	SWE	KEN	POR	ESP	FRA	ARG	GRE	NZL	FIN							NC	0
1999	FAW-Volkswagen FRD RT	Volkswagen Jetta GTX											CHN; Ret	ITA	AUS	GBR			NC	0
2000	Nigel Heath	Subaru Impreza WRX	MON; Ret	SWE	KEN	POR	ESP	ARG	GRE	NZL	FIN	CYP	FRA	ITA					NC	0
2000	Ioannis Papadimitriou	Subaru Impreza WRC 99													AUS; 23				NC	0
2000	Ioannis Papadimitriou	Subaru Impreza 555														GBR; 20			NC	0
2001	Papadimitriou Team	Peugeot 206 WRC	MON	SWE; Ret															NC	0
2001	Ioannis Papadimitriou	Peugeot 206 WRC			POR; 15	ESP	ARG	CYP; Ret	GRE; 22	KEN	FIN								NC	0
2001	Natalie Barratt	Mitsubishi Lancer Evo VI										NZL; 36			AUS; 36				NC	0
2001	Ioannis Papadimitriou	Subaru Impreza WRC 00											ITA; 26	FRA					NC	0
2001	SEAT Sport	SEAT Córdoba WRC Evo3														GBR; Ret			NC	0
2002	Gwyndaf Evans	MG ZR S1600	MON; Ret	SWE	FRA	ESP; Ret	CYP	ARG	GRE; Ret	KEN	FIN	GER; Ret	ITA; 26	NZL	AUS	GBR; Ret			NC	0
2003	Kris Meeke	Opel Corsa S1600	MON; 29	SWE	TUR; Ret			GRE; Ret			FIN; Ret		ITA; Ret		ESP; 19	GBR; Ret			NC	0
2003	Neil Allport Motorsports	Mitsubishi Lancer Evo VI				NZL; 22	ARG; Ret		CYP; Ret	GER; Ret		AUS; 18		FRA; 16					NC	0
2004	Kris Meeke	Opel Corsa S1600	MON; 14	SWE	MEX			GRE; Ret	TUR; Ret		FIN; Ret	GER	JPN						NC	0
2004	Nasser Al-Attiyah	Subaru Impreza WRX STi				NZL; 20	CYP			ARG; 14						FRA; 22	ESP	AUS; 13	NC	0
2004	R.E.D. World Rally Team	Subaru Impreza WRX STi												GBR; 14	ITA				NC	0
2005	Kris Meeke	Citroën C2 S1600	MON; 11	SWE	MEX		ITA; 20			GRE; 26									NC	0
2005	Nasser Al-Attiyah	Subaru Impreza WRX STi				NZL; 16		CYP; 18	TUR; 16		ARG; 17			GBR; 21	JPN	FRA	ESP	AUS; 13	NC	0
2005	Natalie Barratt	Subaru Impreza WRX STi										FIN; 30	GER						NC	0
2006	QMMF	Subaru Impreza WRX	MON; 30	SWE	MEX; 10	ESP	FRA	ARG; 15	ITA	GRE; 17	GER			CYP; 19	TUR	AUS	NZL; 26	GBR	NC	0
2006	Natalie Barrett	Subaru Impreza WRX STi										FIN; 32	JPN						NC	0
2007	QMMF	Subaru Impreza WRX	MON	SWE; 27	NOR	MEX; Ret	POR	ARG; Ret	ITA	GRE; 19	FIN	GER					IRE; 17	GBR	NC	0
2007	QMMF	Subaru Impreza WRX STi											NZL; 30	ESP	FRA	JPN			NC	0
2008	QMMF	Subaru Impreza WRX STi	MON	SWE; 40	MEX	ARG; Ret	JOR	ITA	GRE; Ret				NZL; Ret						NC	0
2008	QMMF	Subaru Impreza STi N14								TUR; 23	FIN	GER					GBR; Ret		NC	0
2008	Interspeed Racing Team	Renault Clio R3												ESP; Ret	FRA	JPN			NC	0
2009	Autotek	Subaru Impreza STi N14	IRE	NOR	CYP	POR	ARG; 16	ITA	GRE	POL	FIN	AUS	ESP	GBR; Ret					NC	0
2010	Tommi Mäkinen Racing	Subaru Impreza STi	SWE	MEX	JOR; 17	TUR	NZL	POR											5th	106
2010	Petter Solberg World Rally Team	Citroën C4 WRC							BUL; 3	FIN; 4	DEU; 5	JPN; 2	FRA; 3	ESP; 2	GBR; 2				5th	106
2011	Petter Solberg World Rally Team	Citroën DS3 WRC	SWE; 5	MEX; 4	POR; 6	JOR; Ret	ITA; 3	ARG; 4	GRE; 4	FIN; 5	DEU; 5	AUS; 3	FRA; EX	ESP; Ret	GBR; Ret				5th	110
2012	Ford World Rally Team	Ford Fiesta RS WRC	MON; 3	SWE; 4	MEX; 3	POR; 3	ARG; 6	GRE; Ret	NZL; 3	FIN; 4	GER; 11	GBR; 3	FRA; 26	ITA; 9	ESP; 11				5th	124
2013	Abu Dhabi Citroën Total WRT	Citroën DS3 WRC	MON	SWE	MEX	POR	ARG	GRE	ITA	FIN; Ret	GER	AUS; Ret							NC	0
2013	Tomáš Kostka	Citroën DS3 WRC											FRA; Ret	ESP					NC	0
2013	Qatar M-Sport WRT	Ford Fiesta RS WRC													GBR; 14				NC	0
2014	Citroën Total Abu Dhabi WRT	Citroën DS3 WRC	MON	SWE; 16	MEX	POR; 13	ARG	ITA; 10	POL	FIN	GER	AUS	FRA	ESP; 15	GBR				30th	1
2015	Citroën Total Abu Dhabi WRT	Citroën DS3 WRC	MON	SWE	MEX	ARG; 6	POR; 24	ITA; 10	POL	FIN; 16	GER	AUS	FRA	ESP; 15	GBR				13th	9
2016	Abu Dhabi Total WRT	Citroën DS3 WRC	MON	SWE; 19	MEX	ARG	POR; 26	ITA	POL	FIN; 16	GER	CHN; C	FRA	ESP; 12	GBR	AUS			NC	0
2017	Citroën Total Abu Dhabi WRT	Citroën C3 WRC	MON	SWE	MEX	FRA	ARG	POR; 17	ITA	POL	FIN; 16	GER	ESP; 17	GBR; 22	AUS				NC	0
2018	Citroën Total Abu Dhabi WRT	Citroën C3 WRC	MON	SWE	MEX	FRA	ARG; 14	POR	ITA	FIN; 37	GER	TUR; 15	GBR	ESP; 21	AUS				NC	0
2021	M-Sport Ford WRT	Ford Fiesta WRC	MON	ARC	CRO; 7	POR; 5	ITA; WD	KEN; 4	EST; 32	BEL; 47	GRE; 5	FIN; 6	ESP; 6	MNZ					8th	54

* Season still in progress.

=== JWRC results ===
Year	Entrant	Car	1	2	3	4	5	6	7	8
2002	Gwyndaf Evans	MG ZR S1600	MON; Ret	ESP; Ret	GRE; Ret	GER; Ret	ITA; 12	GBR; Ret		
2003	Kris Meeke	Opel Corsa S1600	MON; 12	TUR; Ret	GRE; Ret	FIN; Ret	ITA; Ret	ESP; 2	GBR; Ret	
2004	Kris Meeke	Opel Corsa S1600	MON; 3	GRE; Ret	TUR; Ret	FIN; Ret	GBR	ITA	ESP	
2005	Kris Meeke	Citroën C2 S1600	MON; 1	MEX	ITA; 3	GRE; 6	FIN	GER	FRA	ESP
2008	Interspeed Racing Team	Renault Clio R3	MEX	JOR	ITA	FIN	GER	ESP; Ret	FRA	

=== PWRC results ===
Year	Entrant	Car	1	2	3	4	5	6	7	8	9
2003	Neil Allport Motorsports	Mitsubishi Lancer Evo VI	SWE	NZL; 7	ARG; Ret	CYP; Ret	GER; Ret	AUS; 3	FRA; 1		
2004	Nasser Al-Attiyah	Subaru Impreza WRX STi	SWE	MEX	NZL; 7	ARG; 3	GER	FRA; 7	AUS; 5		
2005	Nasser Al-Attiyah	Subaru Impreza WRX STi	SWE	NZL; 4	CYP; 5	TUR; 3	ARG; 1	GBR; 3	JPN	AUS; 5	
2006	QMMF	Subaru Impreza WRX	MON; 3	MEX; 2	ARG; 1	GRE; 1	JPN	CYP; 5	AUS	NZL; 7	
2007	QMMF	Subaru Impreza WRX	SWE; 7	MEX; Ret	ARG; Ret	GRE; 5		JPN	IRE; 3	GBR	
2007	QMMF	Subaru Impreza WRX STi					NZL; 12				
2008	QMMF	Subaru Impreza WRX STi	SWE; 17	ARG; Ret	GRE; Ret			NZL; Ret			
2008	QMMF	Subaru Impreza STi N14				TUR; 10	FIN		JPN	GBR; Ret	
2009	Autotek	Subaru Impreza STi N14	NOR	CYP	POR	ARG; 4	ITA	GRE	AUS	GBR; Ret	
2010	Tommi Mäkinen Racing	Subaru Impreza STi	SWE	MEX	JOR; 4	NZL	FIN	GER	JPN	FRA	GBR
