= Ken Rees =

- Born: Kenvyn Morgan Rees; 26 January 1944; Cardiff, Wales
- Died: 14 May 2020 (aged 76); Monmouthshire, Wales
- Occupation: Television journalist
- Years active: 1968–1997
- Spouse: Lynne Jones (m. 1972; death 2020)
- Children: 2

Kenvyn Morgan Rees (26 January 1944 – 14 May 2020) was a Welsh television journalist. He worked for Harlech Television (HTV), the Wales and West of England ITV franchise holder, from 1967 to 1978 as a reporter, voiceover artist and continuity announcer. Rees was appointed Independent Television News (ITN)'s Northern correspondent in 1978 and became ITN's Washington correspondent in 1985. He returned to HTV as its Head of News and Current Affairs in 1991 and led the company's successful effort to become the world's first television station to launch a fully computerised news operation.

== Biography ==
Rees was born on 26 January 1944 in Cardiff, Wales. He was the son of the school teacher Morgan Rees and Vera Rees. He went to grammar school in the city called the Howardian High School. Upon leaving school, Rees began work at the Wales Gas Board in 1962. Rees joined Harlech Television (HTV), the Wales and West of England ITV franchise holder, in 1967. He did voiceovers, continuity announcing until he was hired to work with the HTV news team by its head of news, Ron Evans in 1968, working in Cardiff at first before moving to Bristol. Rees convinced Evans to hand him an on-the-road job, having read the news on the news magazine programme Reports West.

In 1978, Martyn Lewis stopped working as Independent Television News (ITN)'s Northern correspondent and returned to London. Rees, having worked freelance for ITN on weekends for three years, was appointed to fill the role for the News at Ten bulletin on 16 June, covering Northern England and Scotland. He covered the Kidnapping of Tiede Herrema, the Balcombe Street siege, the London Hilton bombing, provided daily reports on the trial of Peter Sutcliffe in 1981, the Falklands War from Buenos Aires in 1982 and the funeral of Indira Gandhi, the Prime Minister of India, after her assassination in 1984. In December 1984, Rees was promoted to ITN's Washington correspondent and began his role in the job on 1 January 1985, working alongside the reporter Jon Snow. The following year, he was awarded the Television Journalist of the Year by the Royal Television Society. Rees also covered the 1985 Mexico City earthquake, the visit of the Prince and Princess of Wales to the United States in 1985, Operation Breakthrough in Alaska in 1988, the Exxon Valdez oil spill in Alaska in 1989. the Kuwaiti oil fires, the 1988 United States presidential election, the Lebanese Civil War and the Gulf War in 1991.

In December 1991, he rejoined HTV as Head of News and Current Affairs. Rees managed the news room and also presented and conducted interviews on the regional current affairs programme The West This Week from January 1993 as well as presenting a late night phone-in programme. As Head of News and Current Affairs, he led HTV's effort to become the world's first television station to launch a fully computerised news operation that came to fruition in 1997. That September, Rees was one of 24 people based in Bristol to lose their jobs at HTV following its purchase by United News and Media Group. After leaving HTV, he joined Winningtons, a local public relations company, and ran media training courses for business executives and young journalists.

== Personal life ==
Rees married Lynne Jones in 1972. There were two children of the marriage. He died from cancer at his home in Monmouthshire on 14 May 2020. His funeral took place at the Glyntaff Crematorium, Pontypridd on the afternoon of 9 June 2020.
