= 2009 Rally Ireland =

2009 Rally Ireland 2nd Rally Ireland
Round 1 of the 2009 World Rally Championship
Next event →
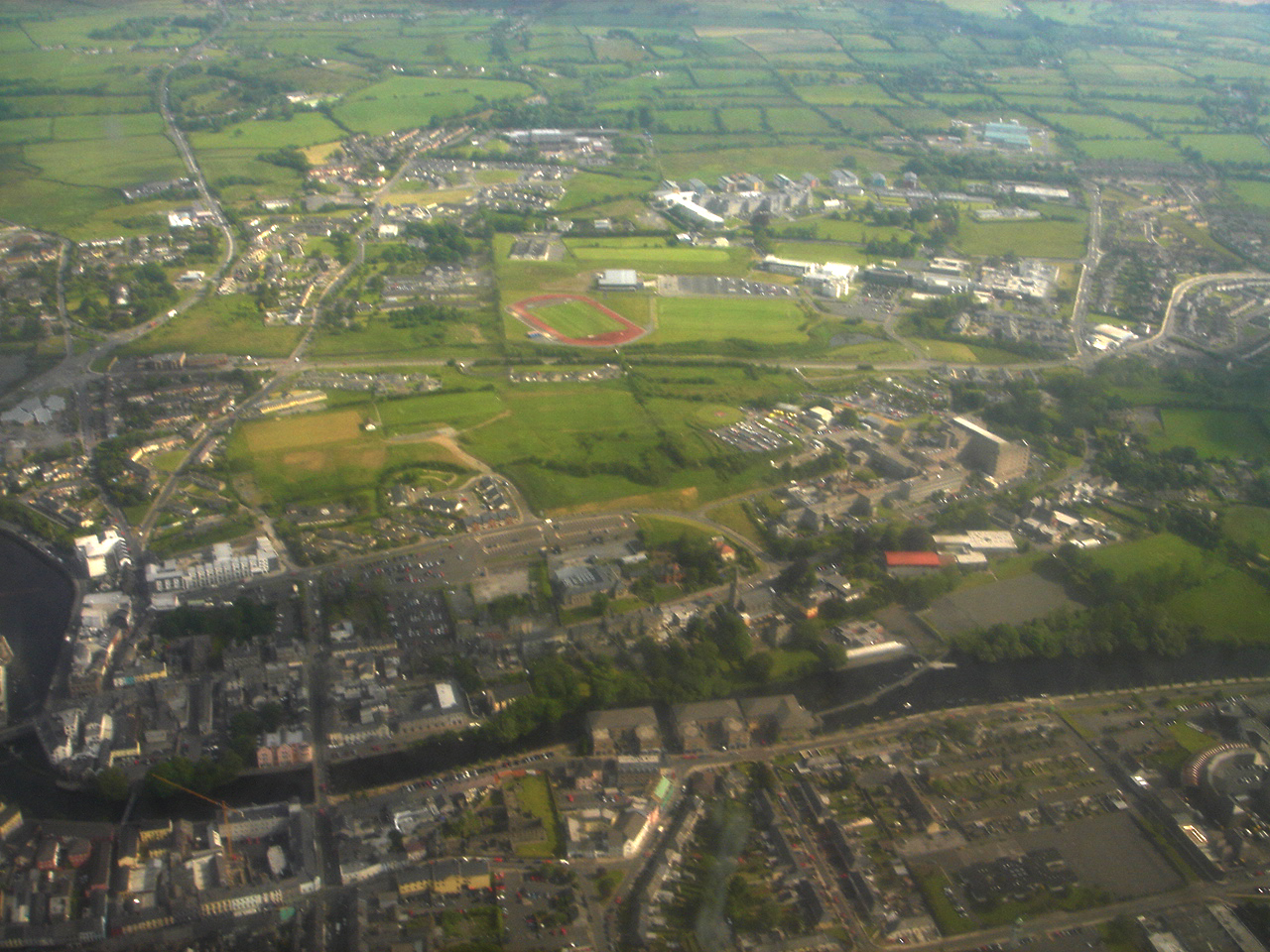
- An aerial view of Sligo, where Rally Ireland's headquarters located.
- Host country: Ireland/Northern Ireland
- Rally base: Sligo, Ireland
- Dates run: 30 January – 1 February 2009
- Stages: 19 (366.94 km; 228.01 miles)
- Stage surface: Tarmac/Mud
- Overall distance: 1,407.68 km (874.69 miles)

Statistics
- Crews: 36 at start, 28 at finish

Overall results
- Overall winner: (France) Sébastien Loeb (France) Citroën Total World Rally Team

The 2009 Rally Ireland, officially 2nd Rally Ireland, was the first round of the 2009 World Rally Championship season and was held between 30 January and 1 February 2009. It was also the opening round of the Junior World Rally Championship this season. Sligo was once again the rally base with the special stages being held on agricultural tarmac roads and major tarmac roads in the north west of Northern Ireland and the Republic of Ireland.

== Introduction ==
The rally returned after a year's absence as to hold the opening round of the World Rally Championship after the Monte Carlo Rally was absent on the year's calendar due to the FIA's Round Rotation calendar system. This happens every two years, so the rally was out for 2010 in favour of Monte Carlo resuming its traditional place as the season opener, but returned in 2011 in the same position.

=== World Rally Championship ===
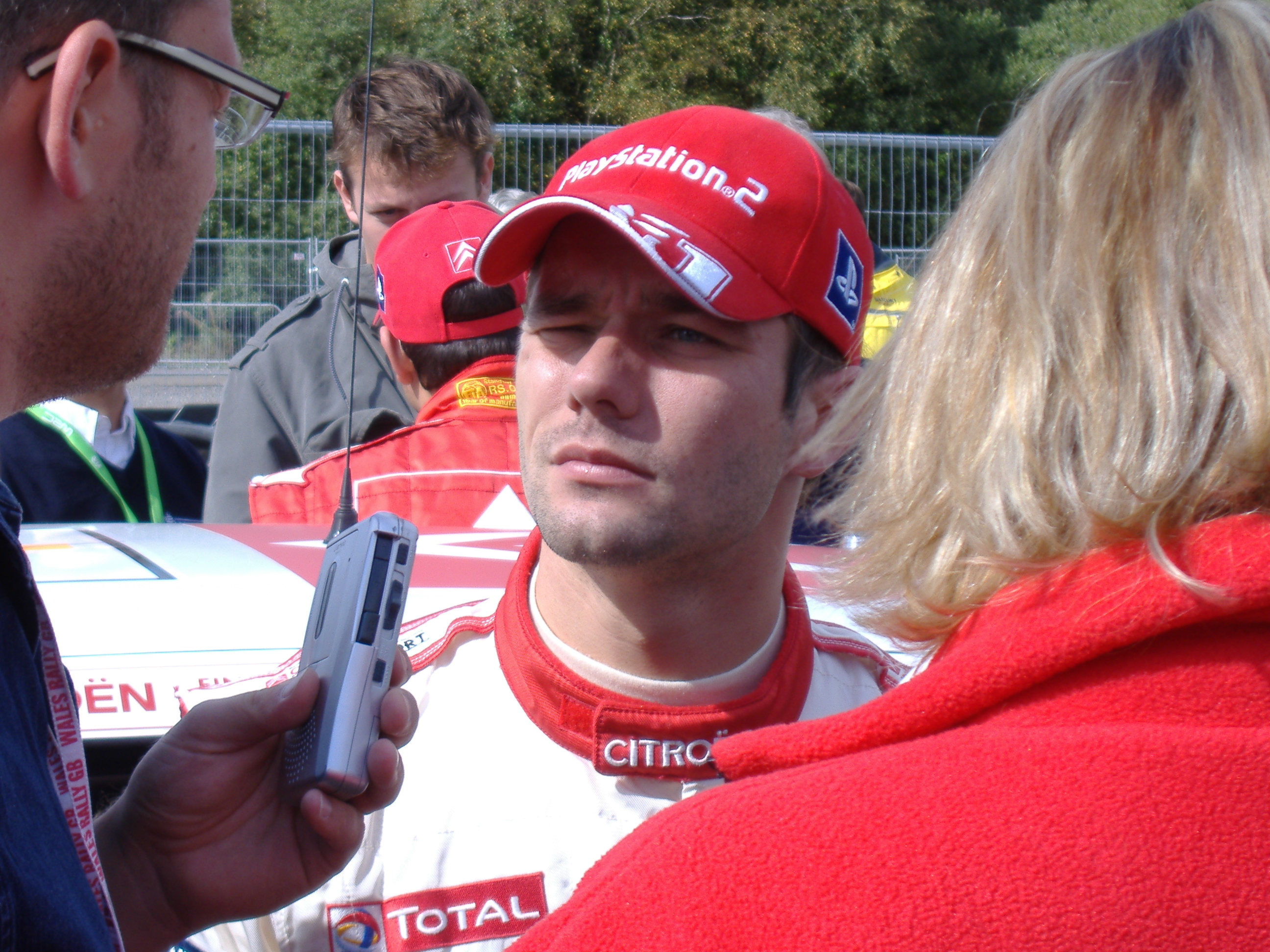
Sébastien Loeb, winner of Rally Ireland for the second time.

During Friday, heavy rain dominated the weekend and drivers found it difficult to compete in this kind of torrential weather, also mud became a feature, especially on broken tarmac roads. But Sébastien Loeb took the win second time in the row with Dani Sordo sealing a Citroën 1–2, two events in succession since the inaugural Rally Ireland held in 2007. Mikko Hirvonen once again settled for third place against the Citroën's tarmac wizards, with 2:07.8 minutes behind Loeb. Norway's Henning Solberg was the only of the Solberg brothers present after the no-show of 2003 WRC Champion Petter Solberg. He finished fourth, his best result on tarmac, but he was almost beaten by Citroën's newbie Chris Atkinson who finished in fifth overall despite some big scary moments, including hitting a telegraph pole on Leg 1 and spinning on Stage 18. Sébastien Ogier finished in sixth ahead of Matthew Wilson in a tight battle, while Khalid al-Qassimi became the first Arab rally driver since 1993 by compatriot Mohammed Bin Sulayem. But some drivers such as Jari Matti Latvala, who leads after Stage 1 broke his drive shaft after a puncture on two wheels, Ford's new driver Urmo Aava who leads after Stages 2 and 3, slid off the road and crashing without heavy impact at the Aughnasheelan Stage 6, and Conrad Rautenbach slid off at Stage 9 at Sloughan Glen and got his Citroën C4 deeply stuck at the mud, were all able to restart under the SuperRally rules to finish 10th by Aava, 14th by Latvala, and Rautenbach crossed the line in 18th place, and all of them score manufacturer's points for their respective teams.

=== Junior World Rally Championship ===
The JWRC drivers suffered in this torrential weather as well in the rally during the course of the weekend as eight JWRC drivers competed. Aaron Burkart who switch from his longtime associates Citroën to Suzuki this year was confident of the decision, just won his first JWRC rally in his debut with the team, ahead of the Czech driver Martin Prokop, unlike Burkart stayed with Citroën. While a distant third place for Italian Suzuki driver Simone Bertolotti, who previously drove for Renault. But worst thing happened that Dutchman Hans Weijs jr. who crash heavily at Stage 14 at Tempo under heavy rain that cause to stop some times by rally drivers such as Yoann Bonato and countryman Kevin Abbring, both had activated the SuperRally rules after retiring at Leg 1, had to start their runs all over again because of the incident, but both he and his co-driver were uninjured and the car was not badly damaged.

== Results ==
Pos.	Driver	Co-driver	Car	Time	Difference	Points
WRC
1.	(France) Sébastien Loeb	(Monaco) Daniel Elena	Citroën C4 WRC	2:48:25.7		10
2.	(Spain) Dani Sordo	(Spain) Marc Marti	Citroën C4 WRC	2:49:53.6	+1:27.9	8
3.	(Finland) Mikko Hirvonen	(Finland) Jarmo Lehtinen	Ford Focus RS WRC 08	2:50:33.5	+2:07.8	6
4.	(Norway) Henning Solberg	(Norway) Cato Menkerud	Ford Focus RS WRC 08	2:54:58.1	+6:32.4	5
5.	(Australia) Chris Atkinson	(Belgium) Stéphane Prévot	Citroën C4 WRC	2:56:17.6	+7:51.9	4
6.	(France) Sébastien Ogier	(France) Julien Ingrassia	Citroën C4 WRC	2:59:09.7	+10:44.0	3
7.	(United Kingdom) Matthew Wilson	(United Kingdom) Scott Martin	Ford Focus RS WRC 08	2:59:49.5	+11:23.8	2
8.	(United Arab Emirates) Khalid al-Qassimi	(United Kingdom) Michael Orr	Ford Focus RS WRC 08	3:02:33.6	+14:07.9	1
JWRC
1. (16.)	(Germany) Aaron Burkart	(Germany) Michael Kölbach	Suzuki Swift S1600	3:16:41.5		10
2. (17.)	(Czech Republic) Martin Prokop	(Czech Republic) Jan Tománek	Citroën C2 S1600	3:17:28.8	+47.3	8
3. (19.)	(Italy) Simone Bertolotti	(Italy) Luca Celestini	Suzuki Swift S1600	3:25:41.6	+9:00.1	6
4. (20.)	(France) Yoann Bonato	(France) Benjamin Boulloud	Suzuki Swift S1600	3:29:47.7	+13:06.2	5
5. (22.)	(Netherlands) Kevin Abbring	(Netherlands) Erwin Mombaerts	Renault Clio S1600	3:34:19.5	+17:38.0	4
6. (25.)	(Italy) Luca Griotti	(Italy) Corrado Bonato	Renault Clio S1600	3:43:49.9	+27:08.4	3

== Special stages ==
Day	Stage	Time (GMT)	Name	Length	Winner	Time	Avg. spd.	Rally leader
1 (30 JAN)	SS1	08:13	(Republic of Ireland) Glenboy 1	22.25 km	(Finland) Jari-Matti Latvala	12:44.0	104.8 km/h	(Finland) Jari-Matti Latvala
1 (30 JAN)	SS2	09:01	(Republic of Ireland) Cavan 1	15.09 km	(France) Sébastien Loeb	8:31.5	106.2 km/h	(Estonia) Urmo Aava
1 (30 JAN)	SS3	09:42	(Republic of Ireland) Aughnasheelan 1	25.19 km	(France) Sébastien Loeb	14:35.2	103.6 km/h	(Estonia) Urmo Aava
1 (30 JAN)	SS4	13:02	(Republic of Ireland) Glenboy 2	22.25 km	(France) Sébastien Loeb	11:37.4	114.9 km/h	(France) Sébastien Loeb
1 (30 JAN)	SS5	13:50	(Republic of Ireland) Cavan 2	15.09 km	(France) Sébastien Loeb	7:40.5	118.0 km/h	(France) Sébastien Loeb
1 (30 JAN)	SS6	14:31	(Republic of Ireland) Aughnasheelan 2	25.19 km	(France) Sébastien Loeb	13:44.6	110.0 km/h	(France) Sébastien Loeb
1 (30 JAN)	SS7	18:54	(United Kingdom) Murley	24.70 km	Stage cancelled			(France) Sébastien Loeb
1 (30 JAN)	SS8	19:39	(United Kingdom) Fardross	14.77 km	Stage cancelled			(France) Sébastien Loeb
2 (31 JAN)	SS9	08:13	(United Kingdom) Sloughan Glen 1	27.76 km	(France) Sébastien Loeb	14:43.3	113.1 km/h	(France) Sébastien Loeb
2 (31 JAN)	SS10	09:06	(United Kingdom) Ballinamallard 1	25.46 km	(France) Sébastien Loeb	13:02.1	117.2 km/h	(France) Sébastien Loeb
2 (31 JAN)	SS11	09:49	(United Kingdom) Tempo 1	13.46 km	(France) Sébastien Loeb	7:33.1	106.9 km/h	(France) Sébastien Loeb
2 (31 JAN)	SS12	13:57	(United Kingdom) Sloughan Glen 2	27.76 km	(Finland) Mikko Hirvonen	14:33.9	114.4 km/h	(France) Sébastien Loeb
2 (31 JAN)	SS13	14:50	(United Kingdom) Ballinamallard 2	25.46 km	(France) Sébastien Loeb	12:51.4	118.8 km/h	(France) Sébastien Loeb
2 (31 JAN)	SS14	15:33	(United Kingdom) Tempo 2	13.46 km	(France) Sébastien Loeb	7:30.1	107.7 km/h	(France) Sébastien Loeb
3 (1 FEB)	SS15	08:35	(Republic of Ireland) Geevagh	11.48 km	(Finland) Mikko Hirvonen	6:11.3	111.3 km/h	(France) Sébastien Loeb
3 (1 FEB)	SS16	09:00	(Republic of Ireland) Arigna	10.88 km	(France) Sébastien Loeb	6:03.6	107.7 km/h	(France) Sébastien Loeb
3 (1 FEB)	SS17	09:51	(Republic of Ireland) Lough Gill	13.51 km	(Finland) Mikko Hirvonen	6:27.0	125.7 km/h	(France) Sébastien Loeb
3 (1 FEB)	SS18	12:09	(Republic of Ireland) Donegal Bay	14.47 km	(Finland) Mikko Hirvonen	8:09.7	106.4 km/h	(France) Sébastien Loeb
3 (1 FEB)	SS19	13:10	(Republic of Ireland) Donegal Town	1.50 km	(Finland) Mikko Hirvonen	1:08.1	79.3 km/h	(France) Sébastien Loeb

== Championship standings after the event ==
=== Drivers' championship ===
Pos	Driver	IRL (Republic of Ireland)	NOR (Norway)	CYP (Cyprus)	POR (Portugal)	ARG (Argentina)	ITA (Italy)	GRC (Greece)	POL (Poland)	FIN (Finland)	AUS (Australia)	ESP (Spain)	GBR (United Kingdom)	Pts
1	(France) Sébastien Loeb	1												10
2	(Spain) Dani Sordo	2												8
3	(Finland) Mikko Hirvonen	3												6
4	(Norway) Henning Solberg	4												5
5	(Australia) Chris Atkinson	5												4
6	(France) Sébastien Ogier	6												3
7	(United Kingdom) Matthew Wilson	7												2
8	(United Arab Emirates) Khalid al-Qassimi	8												1
Pos	Driver	IRL (Republic of Ireland)	NOR (Norway)	CYP (Cyprus)	POR (Portugal)	ARG (Argentina)	ITA (Italy)	GRC (Greece)	POL (Poland)	FIN (Finland)	AUS (Australia)	ESP (Spain)	GBR (United Kingdom)	Pts

Key
Colour	Result
Gold	Winner
Silver	2nd place
Bronze	3rd place
Green	Points finish
Blue	Non-points finish
Blue	Non-classified finish (NC)
Purple	Did not finish (Ret)
Black	Excluded (EX)
Black	Disqualified (DSQ)
White	Did not start (DNS)
White	Cancelled (C)
Blank	Withdrew entry from the event (WD)

=== Manufacturers' championship ===
Rank	Driver	Event												Total points
Rank	Driver	IRL (Republic of Ireland)	NOR (Norway)	CYP (Cyprus)	POR (Portugal)	ARG (Argentina)	ITA (Italy)	GRC (Greece)	POL (Poland)	FIN (Finland)	AUS (Australia)	ESP (Spain)	GBR (United Kingdom)	Total points
1	(France) Citroën Total World Rally Team	18												18
2	(United States) BP Ford World Rally Team	8												8
2	(United Kingdom) Stobart M-Sport Ford Rally Team	8												8
4	(France) Citroën Junior Team	5												5
