= Hassel Iron Works =

Ironworks in Norway

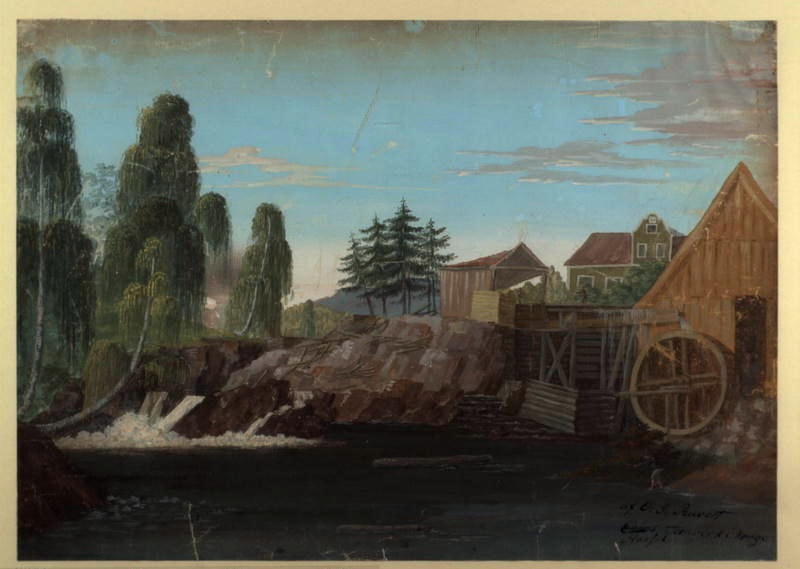
Ole Jørgen Rawert: Hassel Iron Works in Norway, 1805

Hassel Iron Works (Norwegian: Hassel Jernværk; also rendered as Hassel jernverk in modern spelling) was a former mining and iron works company located near the village of Skotselv in Øvre Eiker Municipality in Buskerud, Norway, that existed from 1649 until 1854.

Hassel Iron Works received a royal privilege from King Frederick III of Denmark and Norway in 1649. The mines was in production until 1854, when the company was dissolved and its properties auctioned off. However some limited operations continued until the 1870s under new owners. Its most important mines were located at Hassel in Modum Municipality and Barbu Municipality near Arendal. The operation included a smelter with a large blast furnace. A large water wheel was used to drive the blower in the blast furnace. Hassel Iron Works also received ore from neighboring mines at Sveaas and Skredsvik in Modum Municipality; at Holtefjell, Dramdal, and Såsen in Øvre Eiker Municipality; and from Solberg and Åserud in Nedre Eiker Municipality.

== Other sources ==
- Berg, Ole Jan Hassel Jernverk. Driften og privilegiene 1649–1816 (Eiker trykkeri AS, Hokksund) ISBN 978-82-303-0907-0

== Related Reading ==
- Vogt, Johan Herman Lie (1908) De gamle norske jernverk (H. Aschehoug & Company)
