= 2009 Rally GB =

Rally car race

Round 12 of the 2009 World Rally Championship
← Previous event
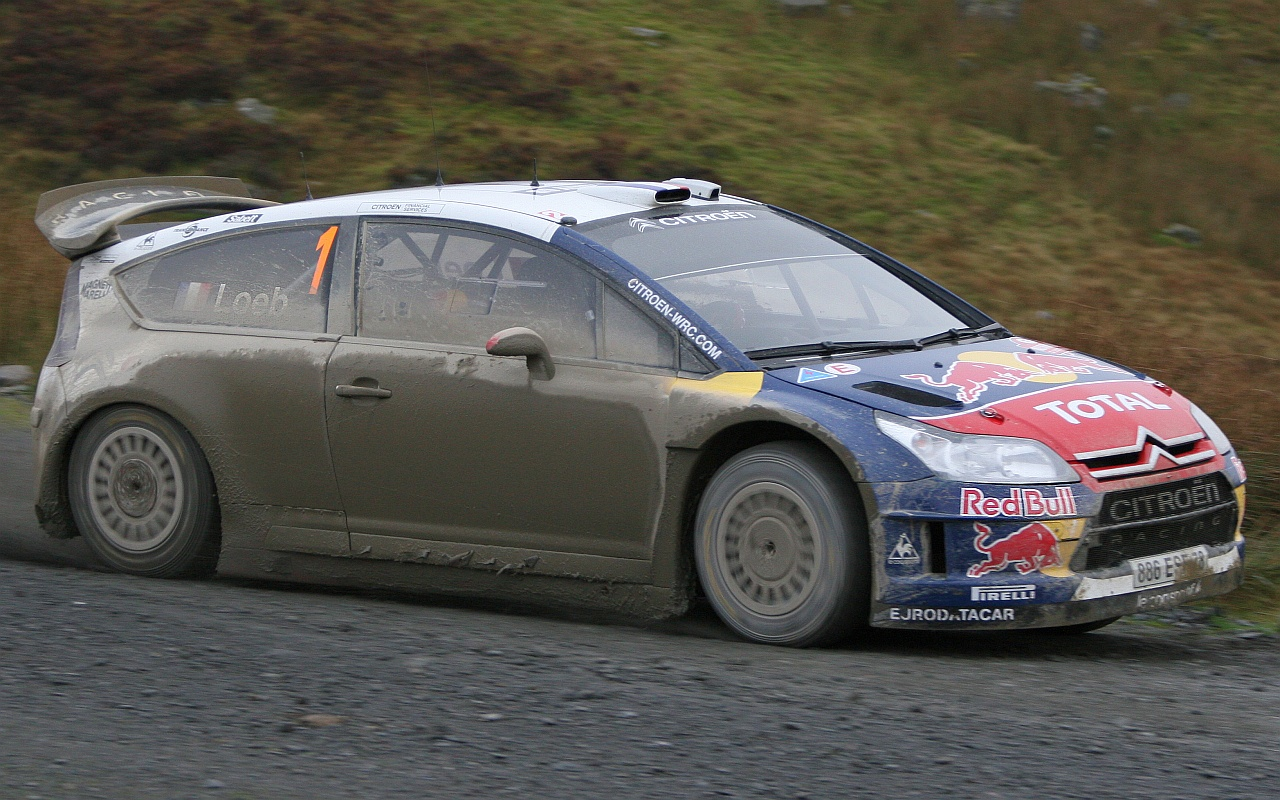
- Sébastien Loeb to record sixth successive world rally title.
- Host country: (United Kingdom) Great Britain
- Dates run: 23 – 25 October 2009
- Stages: 16

Statistics
- Crews: 61 at start, 51 at finish

Overall results
- Overall winner: (France) Sébastien Loeb (France) Citroën Total WRT

The 2009 Rally GB was the 12th and last round of the 2009 World Rally Championship season and the 65th running of the Rally of Great Britain. The rally consisted of 16 special stages.

Sébastien Loeb claimed victory to record a sixth successive world rally title.

== Report ==
Sébastien Loeb secured his sixth world title with a win at the season finale in Wales. His rival Mikko Hirvonen had to settle for second place and thus buried his dream of his first world title. Loeb came to Wales a point behind World Cup leaders Hirvonen. So the starting position was clear. The one who finishes ahead of the other in points is world champion.

Loeb and Hirvonen fought a second duel at the top on the first day. Loeb took the lead in the first stage. Hirvonen kept getting close, but couldn't dislodge him from the lead. The preliminary decision was made on Saturday morning. On stages eight and nine, Hirvonen struggled to find the right pace and lost time. The gap grew to 25 seconds. So Loeb went into the final Sunday with a lead of 30.2 seconds. However, Hirvonen did not give up and reduced the gap to Loeb to 18.2 seconds in the first two special stages.

On the penultimate special stage, a hard landing after a jump caused the bonnet of Hirvonen's Ford to come off. On a full-throttle section, it flipped up and blocked the Finn's view. Hirvonen was forced to stop in order to let his co-driver Jarmo Lehtinen remove the hood, costing him about a minute. Despite Loeb having problems with his turbocharger on the final stage, Hirvonen was no longer able to catch up with the Frenchman, only being able to defend second place overall against Loeb's team-mate Daniel Sordo, who finished third just behind him.

== Results ==
Pos.	Driver	Co-driver	Car	Time (BST/GMT)	Penalty	Difference	Points
WRC
1	(France) Sébastien Loeb	(Monaco) Daniel Elena	Citroën C4 WRC	3:16:25.4		0.0	10
2	(Finland) Mikko Hirvonen	(Finland) Jarmo Lehtinen	Ford Focus RS WRC 09	3:17:31.5		+1:06.1	8
3	(Spain) Dani Sordo	(Spain) Marc Martí	Citroën C4 WRC	3:17:32.5		+1:07.1	6
4	(Norway) Petter Solberg	(United Kingdom) Phil Mills	Citroën C4 WRC	3:17:53.5		+1:28.1	5
5	(Norway) Henning Solberg	(Norway) Cato Menkerud	Ford Focus RS WRC 08	3:22:53.4		+6:28.0	4
6	(United Kingdom) Matthew Wilson	(United Kingdom) Scott Martin	Ford Focus RS WRC 08	3:24:11.4		+7:46.0	3
7	(Finland) Jari-Matti Latvala	(Finland) Miikka Anttila	Ford Focus RS WRC 08	3:28:37.3		+12:11.9	2
8	(Zimbabwe) Conrad Rautenbach	(United Kingdom) Daniel Barritt	Citroën C4 WRC	3:30:53.2		+14:27.8	1
PWRC
1							10
2							8
3							6
4							5
5							4

== Special stages ==
Day	Stage	Time (BST) (23-24 October) (GMT) (25 October)	Name	Length	Winner	Time	Rally leader
1 (23 Oct)	SS1	9:23	Hafren 1	32.14 km	(France) Sébastien Loeb	18:30.2	(France) Sébastien Loeb
1 (23 Oct)	SS2	10:04	Sweet Lamb 1	5.13 km	(France) Sébastien Loeb	3:23.7	(France) Sébastien Loeb
1 (23 Oct)	SS3	10:22	Myherin 1	27.88 km	(France) Sébastien Loeb	15:29.3	(France) Sébastien Loeb
1 (23 Oct)	SS4	13:31	Hafren 2	32.14 km	(Finland) Mikko Hirvonen	18:49.8	(France) Sébastien Loeb
1 (23 Oct)	SS5	14:12	Sweet Lamb 2	5.13 km	(France) Sébastien Loeb	3:24.1	(France) Sébastien Loeb
1 (23 Oct)	SS6	14:30	Myherin 2	27.88 km	(Finland) Mikko Hirvonen	15:39.0	(France) Sébastien Loeb
2 (24 Oct)	SS7	8:35	Rhondda 1	35.72 km	(Finland) Mikko Hirvonen	19:30.0	(France) Sébastien Loeb
2 (24 Oct)	SS8	10:26	Crychan 1	14.99 km	(France) Sébastien Loeb	8:34.4	(France) Sébastien Loeb
2 (24 Oct)	SS9	10:54	Halfway 1	18.37 km	(France) Sébastien Loeb	10:19.6	(France) Sébastien Loeb
2 (24 Oct)	SS10	15:00	Rhondda 2	35.72 km	(Finland) Mikko Hirvonen	19:07.9	(France) Sébastien Loeb
2 (24 Oct)	SS11	16:51	Crychan 2	14.99 km	(France) Sébastien Loeb	8:44.9	(France) Sébastien Loeb
2 (24 Oct)	SS12	17:	Halfway 2	18.37 km	(France) Sébastien Loeb	10:38.0	(France) Sébastien Loeb
3 (25 Oct)	SS13	8:28	Port Talbot 1	17.41 km	(Finland) Mikko Hirvonen	9:00.2	(France) Sébastien Loeb
3 (25 Oct)	SS14	9:27	Rheola 1	22.51 km	(Finland) Mikko Hirvonen	12:34.3	(France) Sébastien Loeb
3 (25 Oct)	SS15	10:56	Port Talbot 2	17.41 km	(France) Sébastien Loeb	9:11.9	(France) Sébastien Loeb
3 (25 Oct)	SS16	11:55	Rheola 2	22.51 km	(Finland) Mikko Hirvonen	12:46.0	(France) Sébastien Loeb
