= 2009 Rally Norway =

2009 Rally Norway 3rd Rally Norway
Round 2 of the 2009 World Rally Championship
← Previous event	Next event →
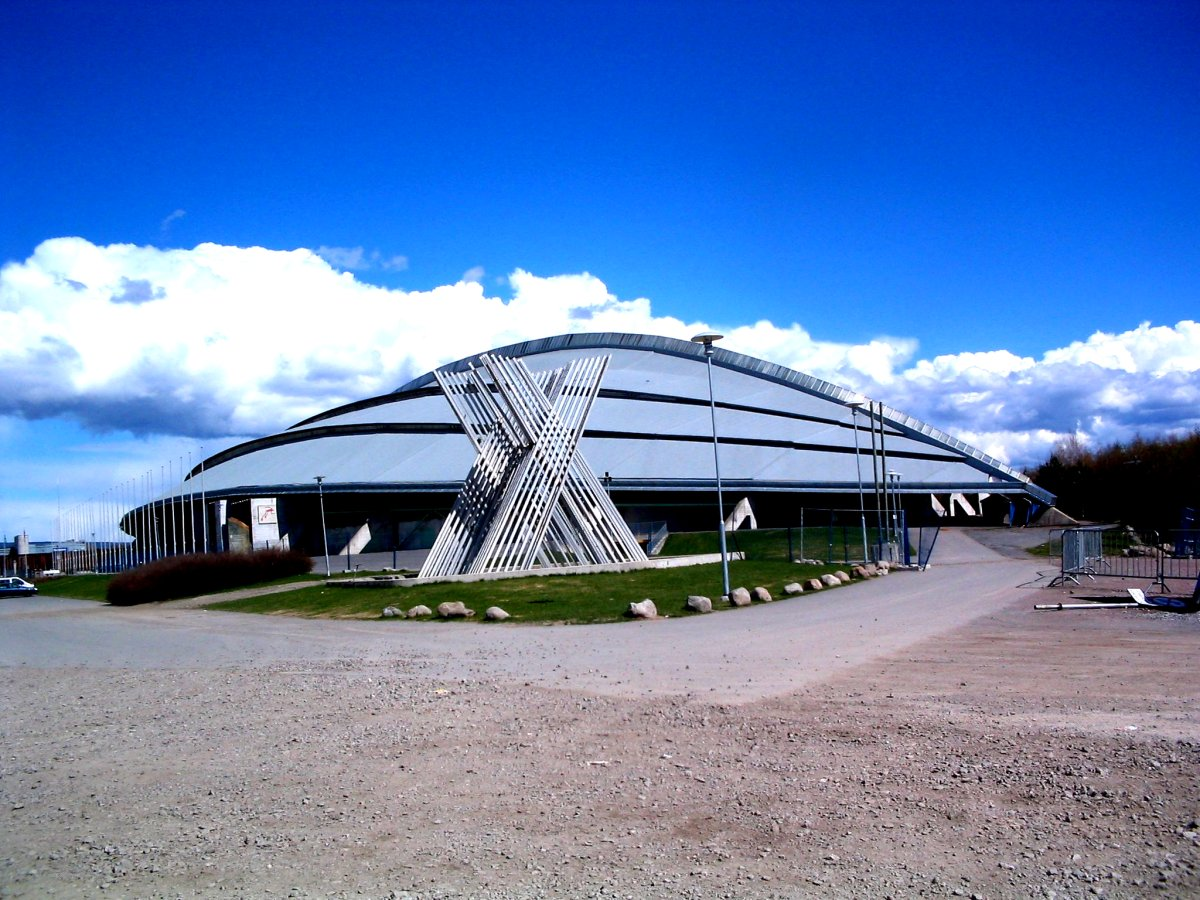
- Vikingskipet Olympic Arena in Hamar, which served as depot.
- Host country: Norway
- Rally base: Hamar, Norway
- Dates run: February 12 – February 15, 2009
- Stages: 23 (361.12 km; 224.39 miles)
- Stage surface: Ice/Snow covered Gravel

Statistics
- Crews: 42 at start, 35 at finish

Overall results
- Overall winner: (France) Sébastien Loeb (France) Citroën Total World Rally Team

The 2009 Rally Norway, officially 3rd Rally Norway, is the second round of the 2009 World Rally Championship season and the first round of the Production World Rally Championship and is held between February 12 and February 15, 2009. The rally was held on ice- and snow-covered gravel roads between Oslo and Hamar.

Rally Norway returned to the calendar in 2009 Season after a years absence. This is the Snow Rally of the season. Historically, the Swedish Rally has usually been the rally held on snow in every WRC Season except 1974 and 1990 due to cancellation, 1994 when it was only part of the FIA 2-Litre World Cup for Manufacturers.

Petter Solberg, driving a Citroën Xsara WRC car, won the first stage of the rally. But Sébastien Loeb of France won in a Citroën C4 WRC, his second win on snow since the 2004 Swedish Rally, remaining only non-Scandinavian rally driver ever to win a Snow Rally. Loeb finished ahead of Mikko Hirvonen by +9.8 seconds. Jari Matti Latvala finished third, despite having spun on the last stage on the second running of the Budor. The highest placed Norwegian driver was Henning Solberg in fourth, who was in a tight battle for the position with Dani Sordo. Sordo had held the position for most of the stages until SS14 Mountain 2, where Solberg passed Sordo for fourth place. Both were under pressure from Swede P-G Andersson, on board a privately entered Škoda Fabia WRC, who passed Solberg at SS7 Finnskogen 2. Andersson had to retire at SS12 Ringsaker 1 when he broke his clutch after hitting a snow bank. Solberg finished in sixth in one peace, although he doubted his clutch would last until the end. He was in a tight battle with Matthew Wilson of Great Britain, who finished in seventh place, ahead of Urmo Aava in eighth who collected his first point of the season.

This rally marks the opening Round of the PWRC Season and as the WRC supporting event. Previously, the JWRC was the supporting event in 2007. Swede Patrik Sandell won the class. Eyvind Brynildsen and his co-driver Denis Giraudet, Didier Auriol's former co-driver finished second. Czech Martin Prokop finished in third place ahead of Armindo Araujo. Andis Neiksans of Latvia finished fifth ahead of Jaromir Tarabus in sixth.

== Results ==
Pos.	Driver	Co-driver	Car	Time	Difference	Points
WRC
1.	(France) Sébastien Loeb	(Monaco) Daniel Elena	Citroën C4 WRC	3:28:15.9		10
2.	(Finland) Mikko Hirvonen	(Finland) Jarmo Lehtinen	Ford Focus RS WRC 08	3:28:25.7	+9.8	8
3.	(Finland) Jari-Matti Latvala	(Finland) Miikka Anttila	Ford Focus RS WRC 08	3:29:37.7	+1:21.8	6
4.	(Norway) Henning Solberg	(Norway) Cato Menkerud	Ford Focus RS WRC 08	3:31:49.4	+3:33.5	5
5.	(Spain) Dani Sordo	(Spain) Marc Marti	Citroën C4 WRC	3:32:07.9	+3:52.0	4
6.	(Norway) Petter Solberg	(United Kingdom) Phil Mills	Citroën Xsara WRC	3:34:41.3	+6:25.4	3
7.	(United Kingdom) Matthew Wilson	(United Kingdom) Scott Martin	Ford Focus RS WRC 08	3:34:51.5	+6:35.6	2
8.	(Estonia) Urmo Aava	(Estonia) Kuldar Sikk	Ford Focus RS WRC 08	3:35:05.0	+6:49.1	1
PWRC
1. (13.)	(Sweden) Patrik Sandell	(Sweden) Emil Axelsson	Škoda Fabia Super 2000	3:49:43.6		10
2. (14.)	(Norway) Eyvind Brynildsen	(France) Denis Giraudet	Mitsubishi Lancer Evo IX	3:50:27.7	+44.1	8
3. (16.)	(Czech Republic) Martin Prokop	(Czech Republic) Jan Tománek	Mitsubishi Lancer Evo IX	3:52:40.3	+2:56.7	6
4. (17.)	(Portugal) Armindo Araujo	(Portugal) Miguel Ramalho	Mitsubishi Lancer Evo IX	3:53:40.6	+3:57.0	5
5. (18.)	(Latvia) Andis Neiksans	(Latvia) Peteris Dzirkals	Mitsubishi Lancer Evo IX	4:00:23.5	+10:39.9	4
6. (20.)	(Czech Republic) Jaromir Tarabus	(Czech Republic) Daniel Trunkat	Fiat Abarth Grande Punto S2000	4:02:33.1	+12:49.5	3
7. (26.)	(Sweden) Patrik Flodin	(Sweden) Göran Bergsten	Subaru Impreza WRX STI	4:10:01.1	+20:17.5	2
8. (30.)	(France) Frederic Sauvan	(France) Thibault Gorczyca	Mitsubishi Lancer Evo IX	4:24:48.0	+35:04.4	1

== Special stages ==
Day	Stage	Time (CET)	Name	Length	Winner	Time	Avg. spd.	Rally leader
1 (12 FEB)	SS1	20:04	Oslo	1.92 km	(Norway) Petter Solberg	1:32.8	74.5 km/h	(Norway) Petter Solberg
2 (13 FEB)	SS2	09:03	Opaker 1	14.62 km	(Finland) Mikko Hirvonen	8:06.0	108.3 km/h	(Finland) Mikko Hirvonen
2 (13 FEB)	SS3	09:39	Kirkenær 1	8.0 km	(France) Sébastien Loeb	6:36.8	72.6 km/h	(France) Sébastien Loeb
2 (13 FEB)	SS4	10:19	Finnskogen 1	20.87 km	(Finland) Mikko Hirvonen	11:55.4	105.0 km/h	(Finland) Mikko Hirvonen
2 (13 FEB)	SS5	11:13	Kongsvinger 1	13.45 km	(Finland) Mikko Hirvonen	8:56.9	90.2 km/h	(Finland) Mikko Hirvonen
2 (13 FEB)	SS6	12:45	Opaker 2	14.62 km	(Sweden) Per-Gunnar Andersson	8:11.2	107.1 km/h	(Finland) Mikko Hirvonen
2 (13 FEB)	SS7	13:51	Finnskogen 2	20.87 km	(Sweden) Per-Gunnar Andersson	11:58.9	104.5 km/h	(Finland) Mikko Hirvonen
2 (13 FEB)	SS8	14:45	Kongsvinger 2	13.45 km	(Finland) Mikko Hirvonen	9:10.3	88.0 km/h	(Finland) Mikko Hirvonen
2 (13 FEB)	SS9	15:46	Kirkenær 2	8.0 km	(France) Sébastien Loeb	6:55.0	69.46 km/h	(France) Sébastien Loeb
3 (14 FEB)	SS10	07:53	Mountain 1	24.36 km	(France) Sébastien Loeb	12:43.3	114.9 km/h	(France) Sébastien Loeb
3 (14 FEB)	SS11	08:58	Lillehammer 1	6.78 km	(France) Sébastien Loeb	5:04.8	80.1 km/h	(France) Sébastien Loeb
3 (14 FEB)	SS12	09:58	Ringsaker 1	27.29 km	(France) Sébastien Loeb	14:30.8	112.8 km/h	(France) Sébastien Loeb
3 (14 FEB)	SS13	11:04	Hamar 1	1.15 km	(France) Sébastien Loeb	1:11.8	57.7 km/h	(France) Sébastien Loeb
3 (14 FEB)	SS14	13:15	Mountain 2	24.36 km	(Norway) Henning Solberg	13:13.4	110.5 km/h	(France) Sébastien Loeb
3 (14 FEB)	SS15	14:20	Lillehammer 2	6.78 km	(Finland) Jari-Matti Latvala	5:15.3	77.4 km/h	(France) Sébastien Loeb
3 (14 FEB)	SS16	15:20	Ringsaker 2	27.29 km	(Finland) Jari-Matti Latvala	15:06.7	108.4 km/h	(France) Sébastien Loeb
3 (14 FEB)	SS17	16:26	Hamar 2	1.15 km	(France) Sébastien Loeb	1:14.1	55.9 km/h	(France) Sébastien Loeb
4 (15 FEB)	SS18	07:34	Våler 1	30.03 km	(Finland) Mikko Hirvonen	16:07.5	111.7 km/h	(France) Sébastien Loeb
4 (15 FEB)	SS19	08:35	Elverum 1	13.31 km	(France) Sébastien Loeb	6:18.9	126.5 km/h	(France) Sébastien Loeb
4 (15 FEB)	SS20	09:23	Budor 1	19.74 km	(Finland) Mikko Hirvonen	10:12.3	116.1 km/h	(France) Sébastien Loeb
4 (15 FEB)	SS21	11:59	Våler 2	30.03 km	(Finland) Mikko Hirvonen	16:23.4	109.9 km/h	(France) Sébastien Loeb
4 (15 FEB)	SS22	13:00	Elverum 2	13.31 km	(Finland) Mikko Hirvonen	6:24.6	124.6 km/h	(France) Sébastien Loeb
4 (15 FEB)	SS23	13:48	Budor 2	19.74 km	(France) Sébastien Loeb	10:24.7	113.8 km/h	(France) Sébastien Loeb

== Championship standings after the event ==
=== Drivers' championship ===
Pos	Driver	IRL (Republic of Ireland)	NOR (Norway)	CYP (Cyprus)	POR (Portugal)	ARG (Argentina)	ITA (Italy)	GRC (Greece)	POL (Poland)	FIN (Finland)	AUS (Australia)	ESP (Spain)	GBR (United Kingdom)	Pts
1	(France) Sébastien Loeb	1	1											20
2	(Finland) Mikko Hirvonen	3	2											14
3	(Spain) Dani Sordo	2	5											12
4	(Norway) Henning Solberg	4	4											10
5	(Finland) Jari-Matti Latvala	14	3											6
6	(Australia) Chris Atkinson	5												4
7	(United Kingdom) Matthew Wilson	7	7											4
8	(France) Sébastien Ogier	6	10											3
9	(Norway) Petter Solberg		6											3
10	(Estonia) Urmo Aava	10	8											1
11	(United Arab Emirates) Khalid al-Qassimi	8												1
Pos	Driver	IRL (Republic of Ireland)	NOR (Norway)	CYP (Cyprus)	POR (Portugal)	ARG (Argentina)	ITA (Italy)	GRC (Greece)	POL (Poland)	FIN (Finland)	AUS (Australia)	ESP (Spain)	GBR (United Kingdom)	Pts

Key
Colour	Result
Gold	Winner
Silver	2nd place
Bronze	3rd place
Green	Points finish
Blue	Non-points finish
Blue	Non-classified finish (NC)
Purple	Did not finish (Ret)
Black	Excluded (EX)
Black	Disqualified (DSQ)
White	Did not start (DNS)
White	Cancelled (C)
Blank	Withdrew entry from the event (WD)

=== Manufacturers' championship ===
Rank	Driver	Event												Total points
Rank	Driver	IRL (Republic of Ireland)	NOR (Norway)	CYP (Cyprus)	POR (Portugal)	ARG (Argentina)	ITA (Italy)	GRC (Greece)	POL (Poland)	FIN (Finland)	AUS (Australia)	ESP (Spain)	GBR (United Kingdom)	Total points
1	(France) Citroën Total World Rally Team	18	14											32
2	(United States) BP Ford World Rally Team	8	14											22
2	(United Kingdom) Stobart M-Sport Ford Rally Team	8	8											16
4	(France) Citroën Junior Team	5	3											8
