= Rally Norway =

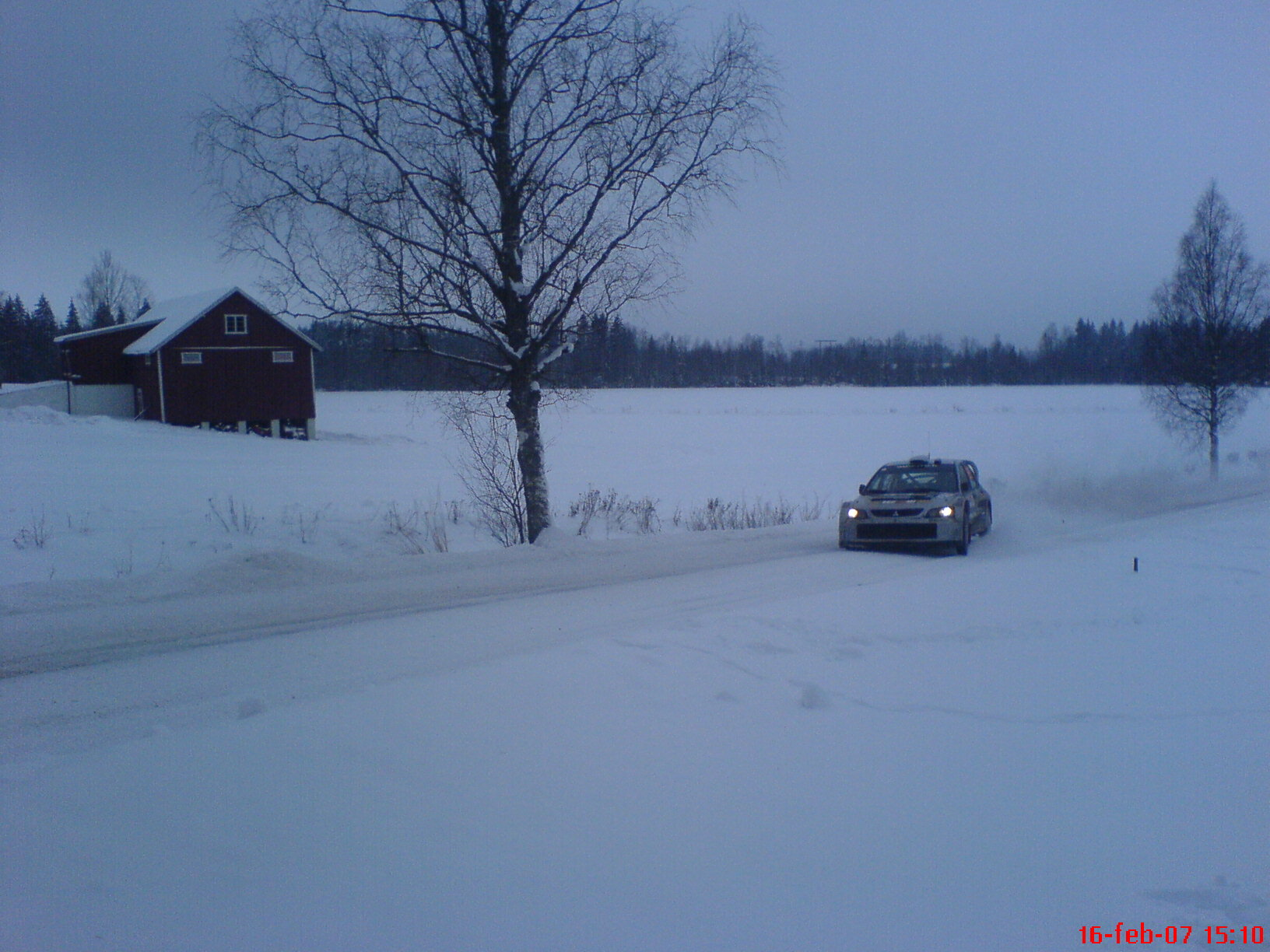
Juho Hänninen, SS6 Kongsvinger

Rally Norway is the Norwegian rally which has been part of the WRC calendar in 2007 and 2009. This rally and Rally Sweden are the only two rallies part of the WRC calendar which are mainly held on snow, with the Monte Carlo Rally also featuring snow on some years. Like the Swedish rally, its stages take place in forest tracks, although tracks in the Norwegian rally are much narrower.

The rally springs from Rally Finnskog Norway with base in Kongsvinger, but the center of the event will, due to better accommodation and hospitality services, be in Hamar. The Vikingskipet ("The Viking Ship") is used as an indoor service area.

== Candidate race ==
A candidate race was arranged 10 and 11 February 2006 with great success. Start and finish was held at Hamar, while the stages took the rally to Lillehammer, Sjusjøen, Kongsvinger, and Elverum.

The rally was won by Henning Solberg. Throughout the first leg Daniel Carlsson was right behind Solberg, but went off the road at SS12 and had to retire the rally. The young talents Mads Østberg and Anders Grøndal took the second and third place on the podium.

The candidate race was by FIA given the grade "B", which outstands several current WRC-rallies.

== WRC status ==
FIA decided 5 July 2006 in a meeting in Paris that Rally Norway was to achieve WRC-status. At first for one season, but with the possibility of prolonging of three more years.

The first WRC-rally on Norwegian snow was held 15–18 February 2007. The rally was won by Mikko Hirvonen, ahead of Marcus Grönholm, Henning Solberg and Petter Solberg.

== Winners ==
| Season | Driver Codriver | Vehicle | |
|---|---|---|---|
| 2006 | (Norway) Henning Solberg (Norway) Cato Menkerud | (France) Peugeot 307 WRC | Report * |
| 2007 | (Finland) Mikko Hirvonen (Finland) Jarmo Lehtinen | (United Kingdom) Ford Focus RS WRC 06 | Report |
| 2008 | Not Held | | |
| 2009 | (France) Sébastien Loeb (Monaco) Daniel Elena | (France) Citroën C4 WRC | Report |

* WRC Rally candidate
