= Solberg =

Solberg is a surname of Norwegian origin (Sol meaning Sun and Berg meaning Mountain), and may refer to:

- Asbjørn Solberg (1893–1977), Norwegian politician from Østfold; served three terms in the Storting
- Dorvan Solberg (b. 1934), American politician from North Dakota; state representative since 1998
- Eirik Lae Solberg (b. 1971), Norwegian politician from Buskerud; representative in the Storting and government minister
- Erna Solberg (b. 1961), Norwegian politician; serving in the Storting since 1989; Prime Minister of Norway since October 2013.
- Harald Solberg (b. 1976), Norwegian politician from Vestfold
- Henning Solberg (b. 1973), Norwegian rally driver; brother of Petter Solberg
- Hill-Marta Solberg (b. 1951), Norwegian politician from Nordland; government minister 1994–97
- Konrad K. Solberg (1874–1954), American politician from Minnesota; legislator and lieutenant governor
- Leif Solberg (1914–2016), Norwegian classical composer and organist
- Magnar Solberg (b. 1937), Norwegian Olympic biathlete
- Marita Solberg (b. 1976), Norwegian soprano
- Monte Solberg (b. 1958), Canadian politician from Alberta; MP for Medicine Hat
- Myron Solberg (1930–2001), American food scientist
- Petter Solberg (b. 1974), Norwegian rally driver; brother of Henning Solberg
- Stian Solberg (b. 2005), Norwegian ice hockey player
- Thomas Solberg (b. 1970), Norwegian professional football player
- Thorvald A. Solberg (1894–1964) United States admiral
- Thorvald Solberg (1852–1949), first Register of Copyrights (1897–1930) in the United States Copyright Office

== See also ==
- Solberg Lake
- Solberg, United States Virgin Islands
- Solberg–Hunterdon Airport, in Readington Township, New Jersey, United States
