= 2009 Rally de Portugal =

2009 Rally de Portugal 43º Vodafone Rally de Portugal
Round 4 of the 2009 World Rally Championship
← Previous event	Next event →
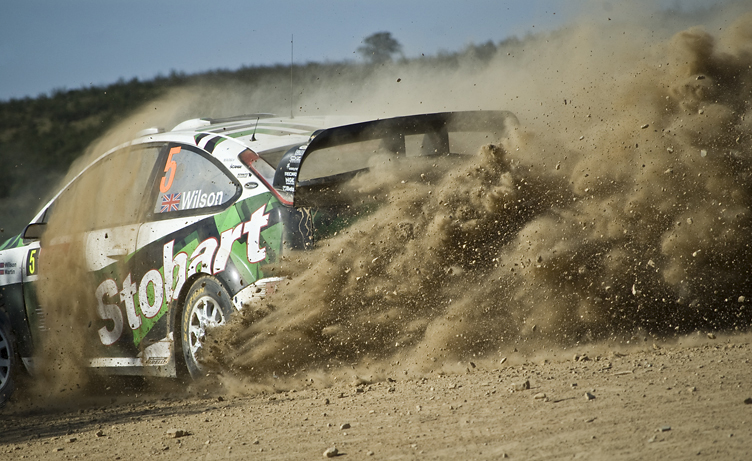
- Stobart's Matthew Wilson during the rally.
- Host country: Portugal
- Rally base: Vilamoura
- Dates run: 2 April – 5 April 2009
- Stages: 18 (341.36 km; 212.11 miles)
- Stage surface: gravel

Statistics
- Crews: 68 at start, 41 at finish

Overall results
- Overall winner: (France) Sébastien Loeb (France) Citroën Total World Rally Team

The 2009 Vodafone Rally de Portugal was the 43rd running of the Rally Portugal and the fourth round of the 2009 World Rally Championship season. It took place between 2-5 April 2009 and consisted of 18 special stages.

The event was won by Citroën's Sébastien Loeb ahead of Ford's Mikko Hirvonen and Loeb's teammate Dani Sordo. Norwegian drivers Petter Solberg, his brother Henning Solberg and Mads Østberg took the following positions. The last point-scoring places went to Federico Villagra and Khalid al-Qassimi, after Evgeny Novikov crashed out from eighth place on stage 15, and fifth-placed Matthew Wilson and now eighth-placed Conrad Rautenbach both retired on the penultimate stage.

The early leader Jari-Matti Latvala had a big crash on the fourth stage, rolling his Ford Focus WRC 17 times over a distance of 150 metres. Marcus Grönholm, who came out of retirement to contest the rally in a Prodrive-prepared Subaru Impreza WRC, crashed out from fourth place on stage eight.

== Results ==
Pos.	Driver	Co-driver	Car	Time	Difference	Points
WRC
1	(France) Sébastien Loeb	(Monaco) Daniel Elena	Citroën C4 WRC	3:53:13.1	0.0	10
2	(Finland) Mikko Hirvonen	(Finland) Jarmo Lehtinen	Ford Focus RS WRC 08	3:53:37.4	24.3	8
3	(Spain) Dani Sordo	(Spain) Marc Marti	Citroën C4 WRC	3:54:58.5	1:45.4	6
4	(Norway) Petter Solberg	(United Kingdom) Phil Mills	Citroën Xsara WRC	3:55:57.7	2:44.6	5
5	(Norway) Henning Solberg	(Norway) Cato Menkerud	Ford Focus RS WRC 08	3:58:59.4	5:46.3	4
6	(Norway) Mads Østberg	(Norway) Ole Kristian Unnerud	Subaru Impreza WRC 08	3:59:33.9	6:20.8	3
7	(Argentina) Federico Villagra	(Argentina) Jose Diaz	Ford Focus RS WRC 08	4:06:12.6	12:59.5	2
8	(United Arab Emirates) Khalid al-Qassimi	(United Kingdom) Michael Orr	Ford Focus RS WRC 08	4:11:24.8	18:21.7	1
JWRC
1	(Poland) Michal Kosciuszko	(Poland) Maciek Szczepaniak	Suzuki Swift S1600	4:22:38.6	0.0	10
2	(Netherlands) Kevin Abbring	(Netherlands) Erwin Mombaerts	Renault Clio R3	4:28:45.1	6:06.5	8
3	(Netherlands) Hans Weijs Jr.	(Belgium) Bjorn Degandt	Citroën C2 S1600	4:32:01.3	9:22.7	6
4	(Italy) Luca Griotti	(Italy) Corrado Bonato	Renault Clio R3	4:37:48.7	15:10.9	5
5	(Italy) Alessandro Bettega	(Italy) Simone Scattolin	Renault Clio R3	4:49:23.1	26:44.5	4
6	(Italy) Simone Bertolotti	(Italy) Luca Celestini	Suzuki Swift S1600	5:04:38.9	42:00.3	3
PWRC
1	(Portugal) Armindo Araujo	(Portugal) Miguel Ramalho	Mitsubishi Lancer Evolution IX	4:15:31.6	0.0	10
2	(Czech Republic) Martin Prokop	(Czech Republic) Jan Tománek	Mitsubishi Lancer Evolution IX	4:16:38.7	1:07.1	8
3	(Norway) Eyvind Brynildsen	(France) Denis Giraudet	Mitsubishi Lancer Evolution IX	4:16:44.7	1:13.1	6
4	(Qatar) Nasser Al-Attiyah	(Italy) Giovanni Bernacchini	Subaru Impreza WRX STi	4:26:09.2	10:37.6	5
5	(Australia) Mark Tapper	(New Zealand) Jeff Rudd	Mitsubishi Lancer Evolution X	4:41:21.2	25:49.6	4
6	(Italy) Gianluca Linari	(Italy) Andrea Cecchi	Subaru Impreza WRX STi	4:43:39.3	28:07.7	3
7	(India) Gaurav Singh Gill	(United Kingdom) David Senior	Subaru Impreza WRX STi	4:46:25.3	30:53.7	2
8	(Czech Republic) Martin Semerád	(Czech Republic) Bohuslav Ceplecha	Mitsubishi Lancer Evolution X	5:00:32.7	45:01.1	1

== Special stages ==
Day	Stage	Time (WEST)	Name	Length	Winner	Time	Rally leader
1 (2-3 APR)	SS1	16:50	Estadio Algarve 1	2.21 km	(Norway) Henning Solberg	2:09.6	(Norway) Henning Solberg
1 (2-3 APR)	SS2	10:15	Ourique 1	23.42 km	(Finland) Jari-Matti Latvala	14:26.9	(Finland) Jari-Matti Latvala
1 (2-3 APR)	SS3	11:12	Silves 1	21.54 km	(Finland) Jari-Matti Latvala	12:11.6	(Finland) Jari-Matti Latvala
1 (2-3 APR)	SS4	11:55	Malhao 1	22.04 km	(France) Sébastien Loeb	14:10.8	(Spain) Daniel Sordo
1 (2-3 APR)	SS5	15:00	Ourique 2	23.42 km	(Finland) Mikko Hirvonen	14:27.3	(Finland) Mikko Hirvonen
1 (2-3 APR)	SS6	15:57	Silves 2	21.54 km	(Spain) Daniel Sordo	12:09.8	(Finland) Mikko Hirvonen
1 (2-3 APR)	SS7	16:40	Malhao 2	22.04 km	(France) Sébastien Loeb	14:06.6	(Finland) Mikko Hirvonen
2 (4 APR)	SS8	09:55	Santa Clara 1	22.61 km	(France) Sébastien Loeb	13:52.3	(Finland) Mikko Hirvonen
2 (4 APR)	SS9	10:30	Almodovar 1	27.18 km	(France) Sébastien Loeb	17:14.6	(France) Sébastien Loeb
2 (4 APR)	SS10	11:40	Vascao 1	22.8 km	(France) Sébastien Loeb	14:47.2	(France) Sébastien Loeb
2 (4 APR)	SS11	14:50	Santa Clara 2	22.61 km	(France) Sébastien Loeb	13:50.0	(France) Sébastien Loeb
2 (4 APR)	SS12	15:25	Almodovar 2	27.18 km	(France) Sébastien Loeb	17:20.3	(France) Sébastien Loeb
2 (4 APR)	SS13	16:35	Vascao 2	22.8 km	(France) Sébastien Loeb	14:40.6	(France) Sébastien Loeb
3 (5 APR)	SS14	07:50	Loule 1	22.65 km	(France) Sébastien Loeb	15:46.6	(France) Sébastien Loeb
3 (5 APR)	SS15	08:45	S. Bras Alportel 1	16.23 km	(France) Sébastien Loeb	11:40.1	(France) Sébastien Loeb
3 (5 APR)	SS16	11:16	Loule 2	22.65 km	(Finland) Mikko Hirvonen	15:34.9	(France) Sébastien Loeb
3 (5 APR)	SS17	12:11	S. Bras Alportel 2	16.23 km	(Finland) Mikko Hirvonen	11:36.0	(France) Sébastien Loeb
3 (5 APR)	SS18	14:00	Estadio Algarve 2	2.21 km	(Norway) Henning Solberg	2:08.8	(France) Sébastien Loeb
