= Henning Solberg =

Norwegian rally and rallycross driver (born 1973)

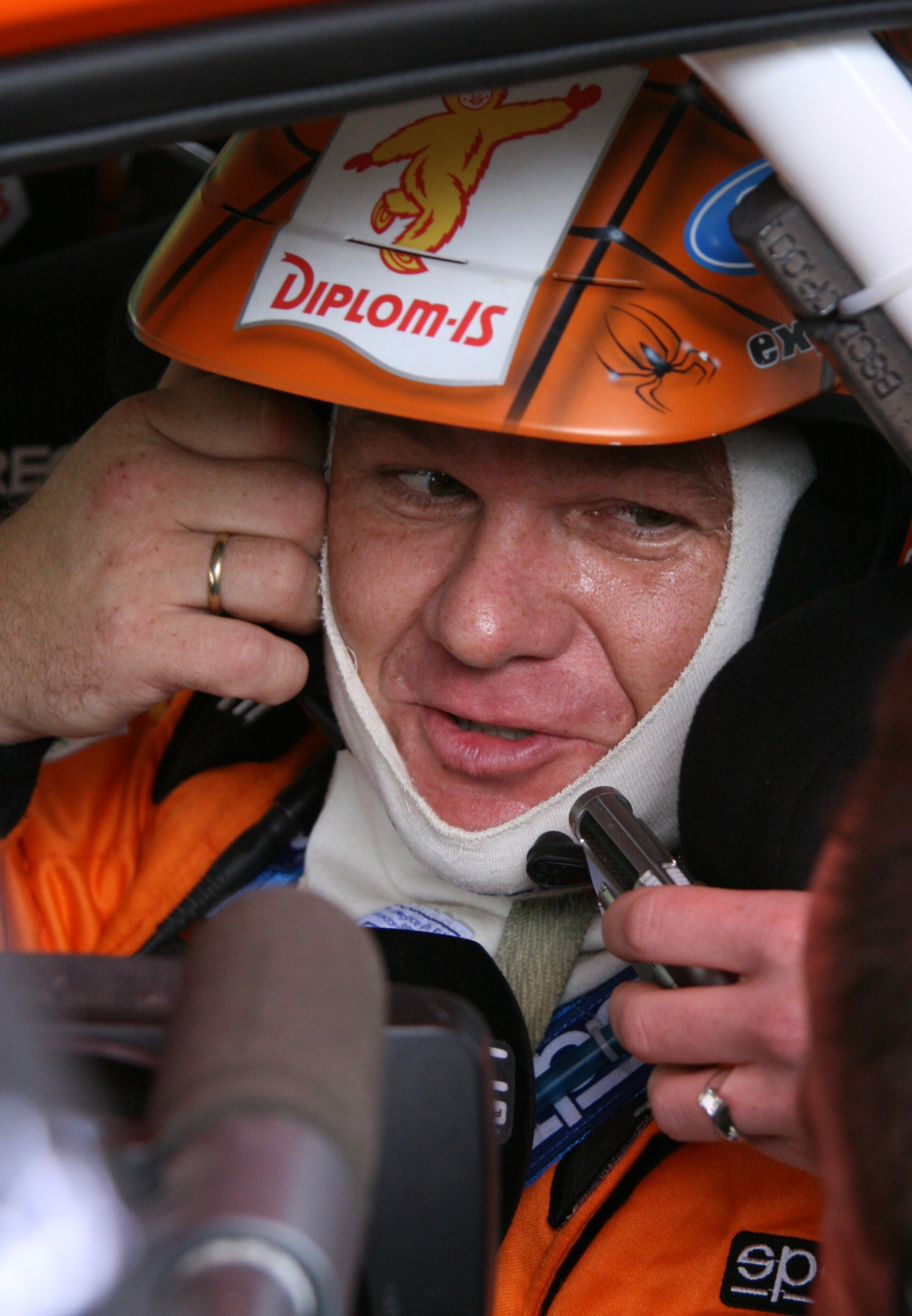
- Solberg at the 2008 Rally New Zealand

Personal information
- Nationality: (Norway) Norwegian
- Born: 8 January 1973 (age 53); Askim, Norway

World Rally Championship record
- Years active: 1998–2019
- Co-driver: (Norway) Runar Pedersen (Norway) Ola Fløene (Norway) Cato Menkerud (Sweden) Göran Bergsten (Austria) Ilka Minor (Belgium) Stéphane Prévot (Sweden) Emil Axelsson
- Teams: Bozian Racing, Ford, OMV Peugeot Norway, Stobart Ford, Munchi's Ford, Adapta Motorsport
- Rallies: 133
- Championships: 0
- Rally wins: 0
- Podiums: 6
- Stage wins: 33
- Total points: 288
- First rally: 1998 Swedish Rally
- Last rally: 2019 Rally Turkey

FIA ERX Supercar Championship career
- Debut season: 2011
- Current team: Eklund Motorsport
- Car number: 73
- Former teams: LD Motorsports; Ford Team RS Sweden; Henning Solberg Motorsport
- Starts: 12
- Wins: 0
- Podiums: 1
- Best finish: 2nd in 2014

FIA World Rallycross Championship
- Years active: 2014–2015
- Former teams: Olsbergs MSE; CircleX; Monster Energy World RX; Eklund Motorsport
- Starts: 14
- Wins: 0
- Podiums: 0
- Best finish: 10th in 2014

Henning Solberg (born 8 January 1973) is a Norwegian rally and rallycross driver.

Solberg is the older brother of the 2003 WRC champion Petter Solberg, the uncle of Oliver Solberg and, through his spouse, the stepfather of Swedish rally driver Pontus Tidemand. His son Oscar' - Pontus' half brother - also used to compete in the World Rally Championship

== Career ==
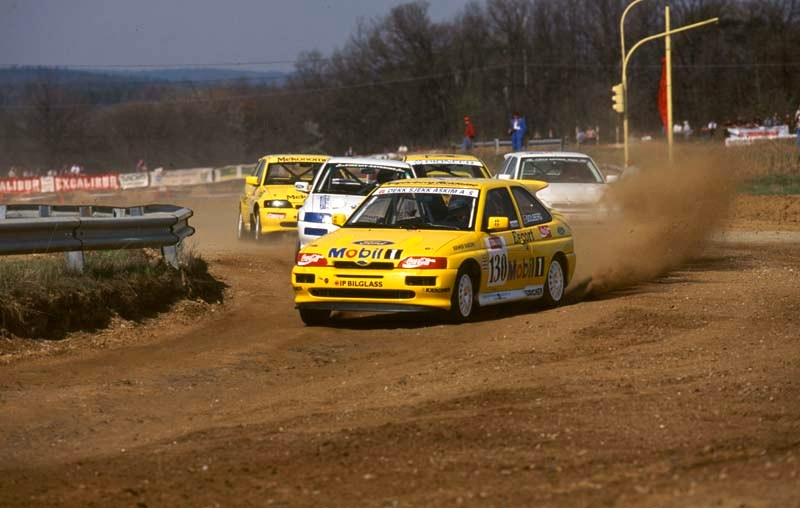
Solberg (Group N Ford Escort RS Cosworth) pictured during the 1995 Austrian Rallycross EC round.

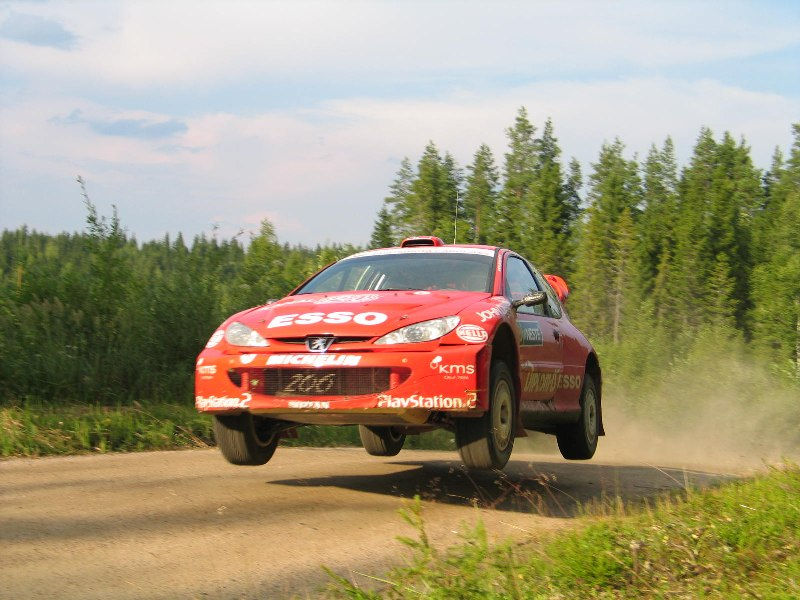
Solberg driving a Peugeot 206 WRC at the 2004 Rally Finland.

Solberg was born in Askim, but grew up in Spydeberg. Like his younger brother Petter, Henning started his career as a driver in bilcross (Norwegian low-budget rallycross similar to Swedish folkrace and Finnish jokamiehenluokka) and rallycross events, and switched completely to rallying in the mid-1990s. Between 1999 and 2003, he became the Norwegian Rally Champion for five years in a row.

After several events as a privateer in the WRC, Solberg got a contract with Bozian Racing for the 2004 season. At his first event with the Peugeot 206 WRC, the 2004 Swedish Rally, Solberg took his first WRC points by driving to sixth place. This remained his best result and only points-finish of the season.

For the 2005 season, Solberg was signed by the BP Ford World Rally Team, Ford's factory WRC team. He competed in seven rounds alongside Ford's main drivers Toni Gardemeister and Roman Kresta. His best result came at the Cyprus Rally, where he beat team-mates Gardemeister and Kresta to the fourth place. With nine points, Solberg finished 14th in the drivers' world championship.

=== OMV Peugeot Norway WRT (2006) ===
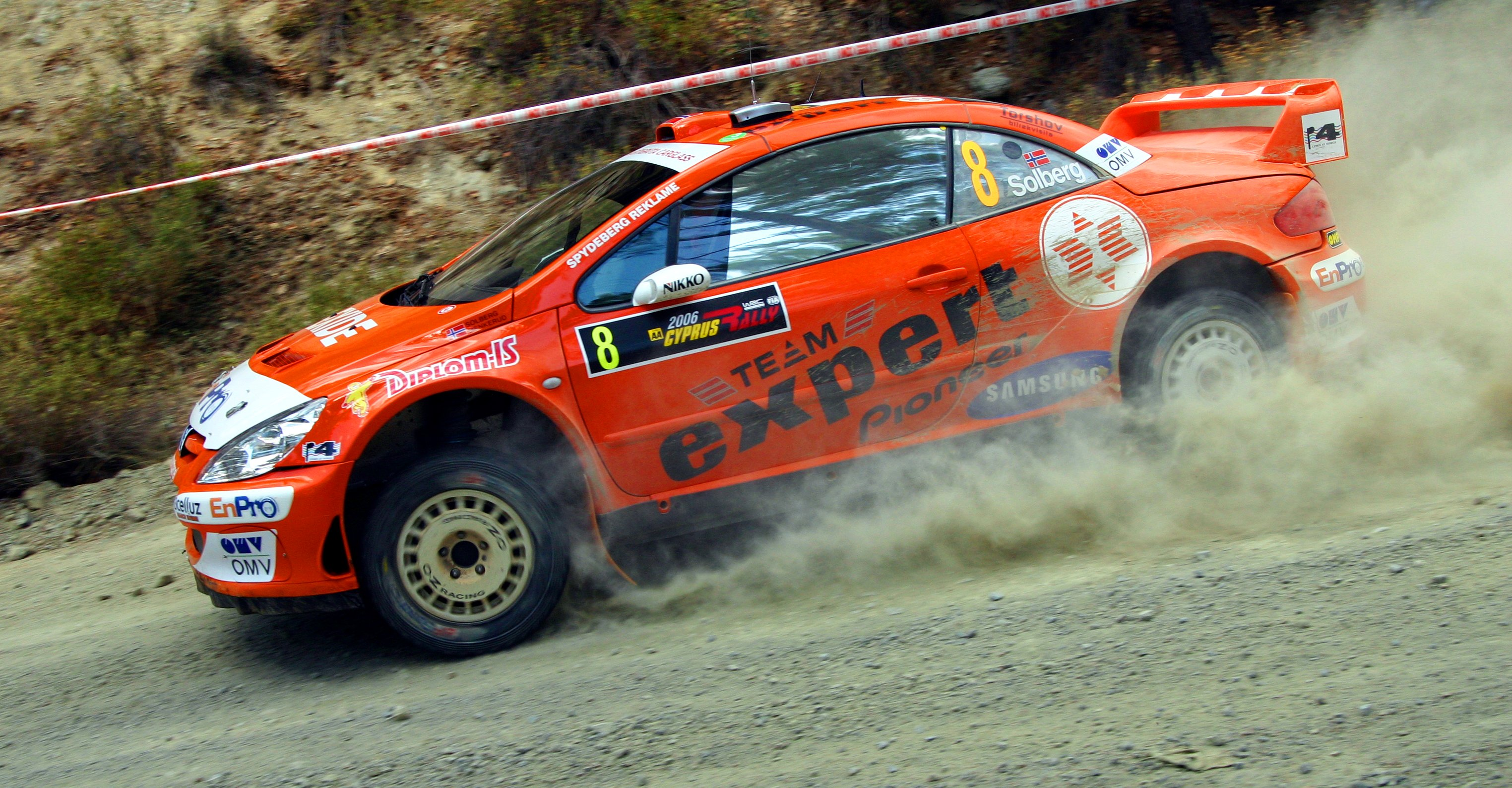
Solberg driving Peugeot 307 WRC at 2006 Cyprus Rally

In 2006, Solberg partnered Manfred Stohl at the OMV Peugeot Norway W.R.T., and drove the Peugeot 307 WRC in 12 of the 16 WRC rounds plus the non-WRC event Rally Norway. He achieved his first ever podium finish coming in third in the Rally of Turkey. With six other points-scoring positions to his name, he finished eighth in the drivers' standings. Solberg also appeared in an edition of the BBC show Top Gear, where he rallied a Mitsubishi Lancer Evolution in a downhill snow track in a race against the Norwegian bobsleigh team at Lillehammer. The Lillehammer Olympic Bobsleigh and Luge Track is 1365 meters long with 16 turns and an 8.5% average grade and Solberg's route was equally challenging. With Top Gear presenter James May as his "co-driver," Solberg made it 1:02:24 in the Evo while the bobsled (with presenter Richard Hammond in it) beat Solberg with a time of 59:68.

=== Stobart Ford (2007–2011) ===
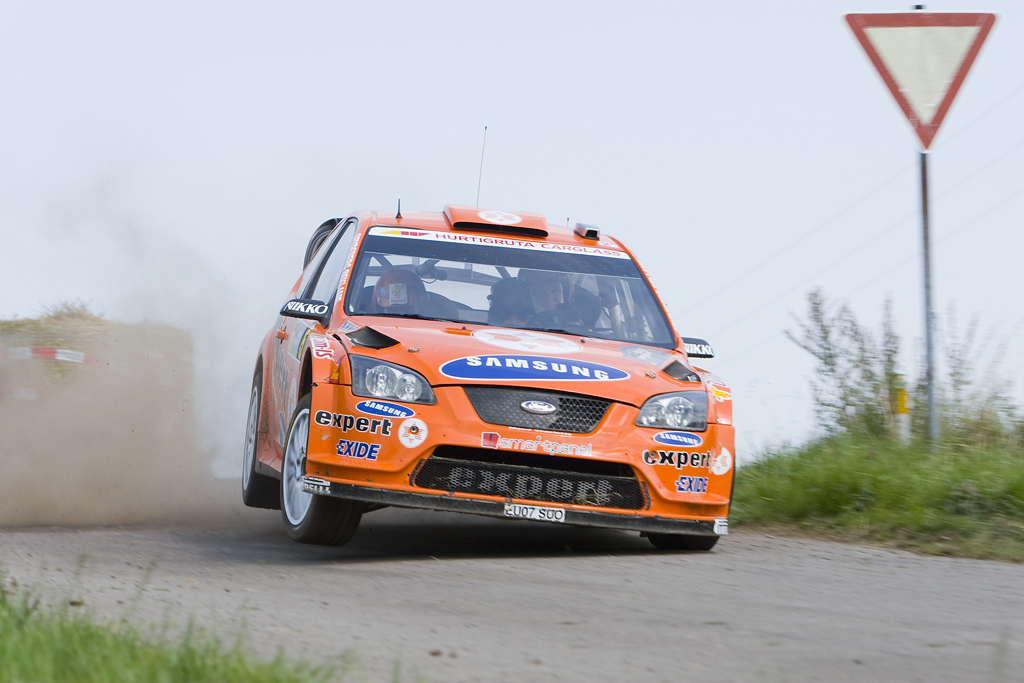
Solberg at the 2008 Rallye Deutschland.

For 2007, Solberg was given a full-time drive with the Stobart VK M-Sport Ford Rally Team. He achieved his second podium finish in the World Rally Championship by driving his Ford Focus RS WRC 06 to third place at his home event, the 2007 Rally Norway, when the rally was part of the WRC calendar for the first time. He later took his career third podium finish at the 2007 Rally Japan, and finished sixth in the drivers' championship, ahead of Subaru's Chris Atkinson and his young team-mate Jari-Matti Latvala.

Solberg retained his place at the Stobart team for the 2008 season. In Sweden he was on course for a podium finish before a puncture and a crash on the second day put him out of the points. For México Solberg was nominated to score points for the Munchi's team. He achieved a fifth-place finish despite suffering two punctures. In the series' first-ever Jordan Rally, he recorded his best result of the season by finishing fourth. After five more points-scoring finishes were followed by five rallies with no points, Solberg finished eighth overall in the drivers' standings. At the 2008 Mountain Rally Norway, the first round in the 2008 Norwegian Rally Championship, Henning took first in his class driving a Ford Fiesta ST N3.

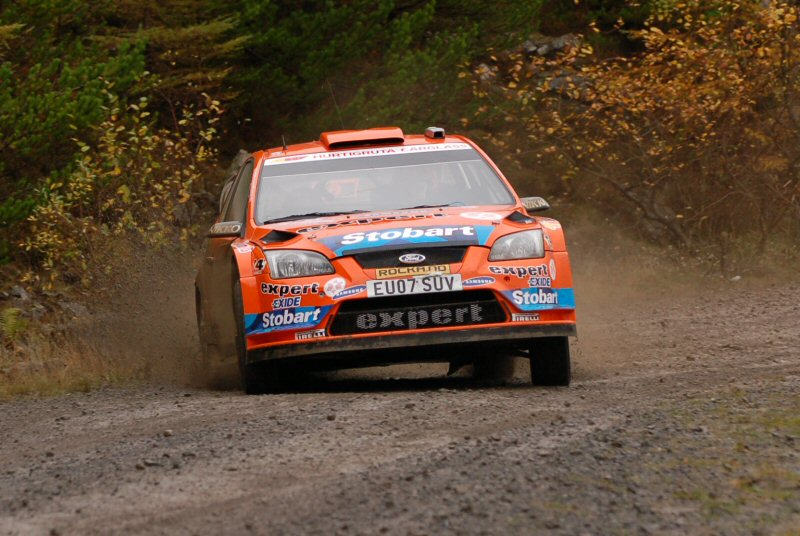
Solberg driving a Ford Focus RS WRC 08 at the 2009 Rally GB.

In 2009, Solberg had his career-best start to the season. He drove his Focus RS WRC 08 to fourth place both in the season-opening Rally Ireland and the following Rally Norway. After a road accident ended his chances in Cyprus, he finished fifth in Portugal and took his career fourth podium place in Argentina, behind the Citroën duo Sébastien Loeb and Dani Sordo. He achieved another podium in Poland.

In 2010, Solberg was driving Ford Focus RS WRC 08 at first 6 events but at 2010 Rally Bulgaria he drove a Ford Fiesta S2000. At 2010 Rally Finland, 2010 Rallye Deutschland and 2010 Rally Japan he drove Ford Focus RS WRC 08 again. At last two rallies he drove Ford Fiesta S2000. His co-driver is Ilka Minor, but during her injury his co-driver was Stéphane Prévot. Every time Solberg participated in WRC with a S2000 car he scored points and beat a few WRC drivers.

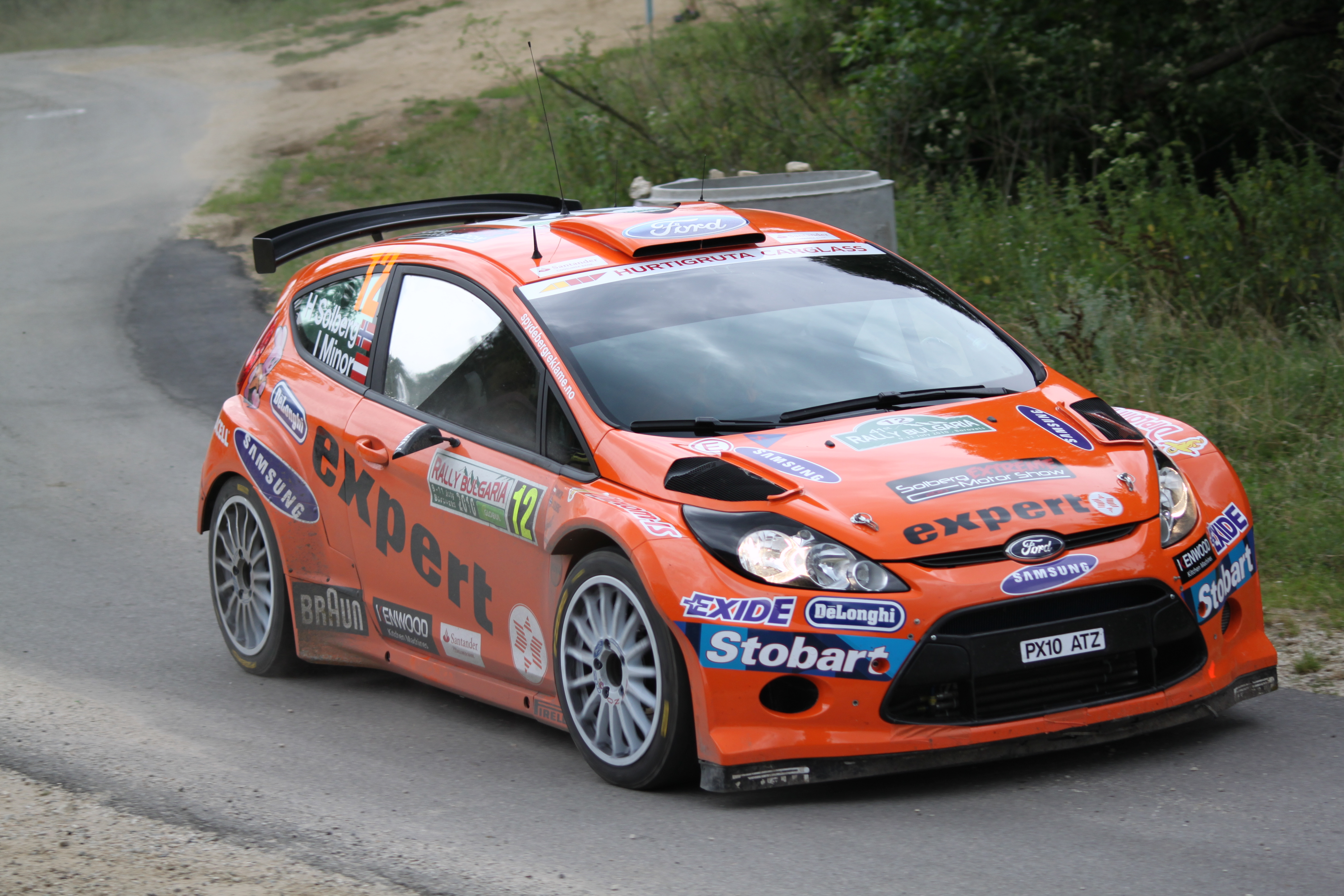
Henning Solberg at 2010 Rally Bulgaria

=== Go Fast Energy World Rally Team (2012) ===
Solberg competed for the privateer Go Fast Energy World Rally Team along with Matthew Wilson in the first half of the 2012 season. In Monte Carlo, due to various issues, he finished outside the top ten. Henning could retaliate on the next round in Sweden, finishing in 7th place. After that, the whole Go Fast team disappeared as a whole.

=== 2013 ===
Solberg made his return to the WRC on the 2013 World Rally Championship's second round, Rally Sweden, after a one-year hiatus. His co-driver was Emil Axelsson, and he used M-Sport's Fiesta RS WRC. The car sported a full white design without any sponsors, although they later put up "Can you watch this space?" stickers to cover the space on the sides and the hood. The pairing finished eighth.

== Racing record ==
=== Complete WRC results ===
Year	Entrant	Car	1	2	3	4	5	6	7	8	9	10	11	12	13	14	15	16	WDC	Points
1998	Shell Norge	Toyota Celica GT-Four ST205	MON	SWE; 12	KEN	POR	ESP	FRA	ARG	GRE	NZL	FIN	ITA	AUS	GBR				NC	0
1999	Henning Solberg	Ford Escort WRC	MON	SWE	KEN	POR	ESP	FRA	ARG	GRE	NZL	FIN	CHN	ITA	AUS	GBR; Ret			NC	0
2000	Henning Solberg	Ford Escort WRC	MON	SWE; Ret	KEN	POR; Ret	ESP	ARG	GRE	NZL									NC	0
2000	Henning Solberg	Toyota Corolla WRC									FIN; Ret	CYP	FRA	ITA	AUS	GBR; 14			NC	0
2001	Henning Solberg	Toyota Corolla WRC	MON	SWE; Ret	POR; Ret	ESP	ARG	CYP	GRE	KEN	FIN; Ret	NZL	ITA	FRA	AUS				NC	0
2001	Henning Solberg	Subaru Impreza WRC														GBR; 13			NC	0
2002	Henning Solberg	Toyota Corolla WRC	MON	SWE; 13	FRA	ESP	CYP	ARG	GRE	KEN	FIN; Ret	GER	ITA	NZL	AUS	GBR			NC	0
2003	Henning Solberg	Mitsubishi Lancer Evo VI	MON	SWE; Ret	TUR	NZL	ARG	GRE	CYP	GER	FIN; Ret	AUS	ITA	FRA	ESP	GBR			NC	0
2004	Bozian Racing	Peugeot 206 WRC	MON	SWE; 6	MEX	NZL; Ret	CYP; Ret	GRE	TUR; Ret	ARG	FIN; 10	GER	JPN	GBR; 11	ITA; Ret	FRA	ESP	AUS	19th	3
2005	BP Ford	Ford Focus RS WRC 04	MON	SWE; 5	MEX	NZL	ITA; 15	CYP; 4	TUR; 11	GRE; Ret	ARG	FIN; 9	GER	GBR; 10	JPN	FRA	ESP	AUS	14th	9
2006	OMV Peugeot Norway	Peugeot 307 WRC	MON; Ret	SWE; 8	MEX; 5	ESP	FRA	ARG; 7	ITA; Ret	GRE; 5	GER	FIN; 4	JPN	CYP; 6	TUR; 3	AUS; Ret	NZL; 12	GBR; 11	8th	25
2007	Stobart M-Sport	Ford Focus RS WRC 06	MON; 14	SWE; 4	NOR; 3	MEX; 9	POR; 11	ARG; 5	ITA; 4	GRE; 5	FIN; 5	GER; 13	NZL; 9	ESP; 10	FRA; 9	JPN; 3	IRE; 16	GBR; 15	6th	34
2008	Stobart M-Sport	Ford Focus RS WRC 07	MON; 9	SWE; 13		ARG; Ret	JOR; 4		GRE; 8	TUR; 5	FIN; 5	GER; 7			FRA; 15		GBR; Ret		8th	22
2008	Munchi's	Ford Focus RS WRC 07			MEX; 5			ITA; 7					NZL; 9	ESP; 11		JPN; Ret			8th	22
2009	Stobart M-Sport	Ford Focus RS WRC 08	IRE; 4	NOR; 4	CYP; 18	POR; 5	ARG; 3	ITA; 8	GRE; 14	POL; 3	FIN; 30	AUS; 7	ESP; 9	GBR; 5					6th	33
2010	Stobart M-Sport	Ford Focus RS WRC 08	SWE; 6	MEX; 6	JOR; 9	TUR; 25	NZL; 7	POR; Ret		FIN; Ret	GER; 37	JPN; 7			GBR; 6				8th	45
2010	Stobart M-Sport	Ford Fiesta S2000							BUL; 10				FRA; 9	ESP; 8					8th	45
2011	Stobart M-Sport	Ford Fiesta RS WRC	SWE; Ret	MEX; 6	POR; 9	JOR; 14	ITA; Ret	ARG; DNS	GRE; 5	FIN; 7	GER; 7	AUS; 14	FRA; 6	ESP; 8	GBR; 3				9th	59
2012	Go Fast Energy	Ford Fiesta RS WRC	MON; 13	SWE; 7	MEX; WD	POR; WD	ARG	GRE; WD	NZL; WD	FIN; WD	GER	GBR	FRA	ITA	ESP				20th	6
2013	Henning Solberg	Ford Fiesta RS WRC	MON	SWE; 8	MEX	POR	ARG	GRE	ITA	FIN	GER	AUS	FRA	ESP	GBR				22nd	4
2014	Henning Solberg	Ford Fiesta RS WRC	MON	SWE; 7	MEX	POR; 5	ARG		POL; 9	FIN; 9	GER	AUS	FRA	ESP	GBR; Ret				11th	26
2014	Adapta Motorsport	Ford Fiesta RS WRC						ITA; 7											11th	26
2015	Henning Solberg	Ford Fiesta RS WRC	MON; 11																NC	0
2015	Adapta Motorsport	Ford Fiesta RS WRC		SWE; 12	MEX	POR	ARG	ITA	POL	FIN	GER	AUS	FRA	ESP	GBR				NC	0
2016	Henning Solberg	Ford Fiesta RS WRC	MON	SWE; 7	MEX	ARG; 9	POR; 27	ITA; 7	POL; 15		GER	CHN; C	FRA	ESP	GBR; WD	AUS			12th	14
2016	M-Sport	Ford Fiesta R5								FIN; 12									12th	14
2017	Henning Solberg	Škoda Fabia R5	MON	SWE; 31	MEX	FRA	ARG	POR	ITA	POL	FIN	GER	ESP	GBR	AUS				NC	0
2018	Henning Solberg	Ford Fiesta WRC	MON	SWE; 19	MEX	FRA	ARG	POR	ITA	FIN	GER								17th	8
2018	Henning Solberg	Škoda Fabia R5										TUR; 6	GBR						17th	8
2018	Toksport World Rally Team	Škoda Fabia R5												ESP; 17	AUS				17th	8
2019	Toksport World Rally Team	Škoda Fabia R5	MON	SWE; 17	MEX	FRA	ARG	CHL	POR; 11	ITA	FIN; 15	GER	TUR; 15	GBR; WD	ESP	AUS; C			NC	0

=== WRC-2 results ===
Year	Entrant	Car	1	2	3	4	5	6	7	8	9	10	11	12	13	14	WDC	Points
2016	M-Sport	Ford Fiesta R5	MON	SWE	MEX	ARG	POR	ITA	POL	FIN; 4	GER	CHN; C	FRA	ESP	GBR	AUS	28th	12
2018	Toksport World Rally Team	Škoda Fabia R5	MON	SWE	MEX	FRA	ARG	POR	ITA	FIN	GER	TUR	GBR	ESP; 6	AUS		35th	8
2019	Toksport World Rally Team	Škoda Fabia R5	MON	SWE; 7	MEX	FRA	ARG	CHL	POR; 3	ITA	FIN; 5	GER	TUR; 4	GBR; WD	ESP	AUS; C	9th	43

=== Complete FIA European Rallycross Championship results ===
==== Division 1^{*} ====
Year	Entrant	Car	1	2	3	4	5	6	7	8	9	10	11	12	ERX	Points
1994	Henning Solberg	Nissan Sunny GTI-R	AUT	POR	FRA	IRE	GBR	SWE	FIN	BEL	NED	NOR; 10	GER		28th	7
1995	Henning Solberg	Ford Escort RS Cosworth	AUT; 2	POR; NC	FRA; NC	SWE; 8	GBR; 12	IRE; 6	BEL (NC)	NED	NOR; 13	FIN; 11	CZE	GER	12th	52

^{*} Division 1 was rebranded as Division 2 in 1997.

==== Division 1 ====
Year	Entrant	Car	1	2	3	4	5	6	7	8	9	10	ERX	Points
2009	Ford Team RS Sweden	Ford Fiesta	GBR	POR	FRA	HUN	AUT	SWE; 4	BEL	GER	POL	CZE; 5	15th	30
2010	Henning Solberg	Ford Fiesta	POR	FRA	GBR	HUN	SWE; 15	FIN	BEL	GER	POL	CZE	36th	2

==== Supercar ====
Year	Entrant	Car	1	2	3	4	5	6	7	8	9	10	ERX	Points
2011	Henning Solberg Motorsport	Citroën C4	GBR	POR	FRA	NOR; 7	SWE	BEL	NED	AUT	POL	CZE	22nd	10
2013	Henning Solberg Motorsport	Saab 9-3	GBR; 15	POR	HUN	FIN	NOR; 18	SWE; 4	FRA; 12	AUT	GER		15th	28
2014	Eklund Motorsport	Saab 9-3	GBR; 5	NOR; 4	BEL; 7								2nd	56
2014	LD Motorsports	Citroën DS3				GER; 10	ITA; 3						2nd	56
2017	Eklund Motorsport	Volkswagen Beetle	BAR; 6	NOR; 12	SWE; 14	FRA	LAT						14th	23

=== Complete FIA World Rallycross Championship results ===
==== Supercar ====
Year	Entrant	Car	1	2	3	4	5	6	7	8	9	10	11	12	13	WRX	Points
2014	Eklund Motorsport	Saab 9-3	POR	GBR; 9	NOR; 5	FIN	SWE; 13	BEL; 15								10th	70
2014	Monster Energy World RX	Citroën DS3							CAN; 11	FRA; 24	GER; 15	ITA; 9	TUR; 5	ARG; 15		10th	70
2015	CircleX	Ford Focus	POR	HOC	BEL	GBR	GER	SWE; 33	CAN							25th	12
2015	Olsbergs MSE	Ford Fiesta ST								NOR; 13	FRA					25th	12
2015	Eklund Motorsport	Volkswagen Beetle										BAR; 14	TUR	ITA; 15	ARG	25th	12
