= Holtefjell =

Mountain in Norway

Coordinates: 59°51′N 9°48′E

Geography
- Location: Buskerud, Norway

Holtefjell is a mountain located on the border between Øvre Eiker and Flesberg in Buskerud, Norway.
