= Solberg Lake =

Lake in the state of Minnesota, United States

- Location within Minnesota
- Location: Douglas and Grant County, Minnesota
- Coordinates: 45°56′57″N 95°45′41″W
- Type: lake

Solberg Lake is a lake in the U.S. state of Minnesota.

Solberg Lake was named for A. H. Solberg, a pioneer farmer who settled there.

== See also ==
- List of lakes in Minnesota
