= Mikko Hirvonen =

Finnish rally driver (born 1980)

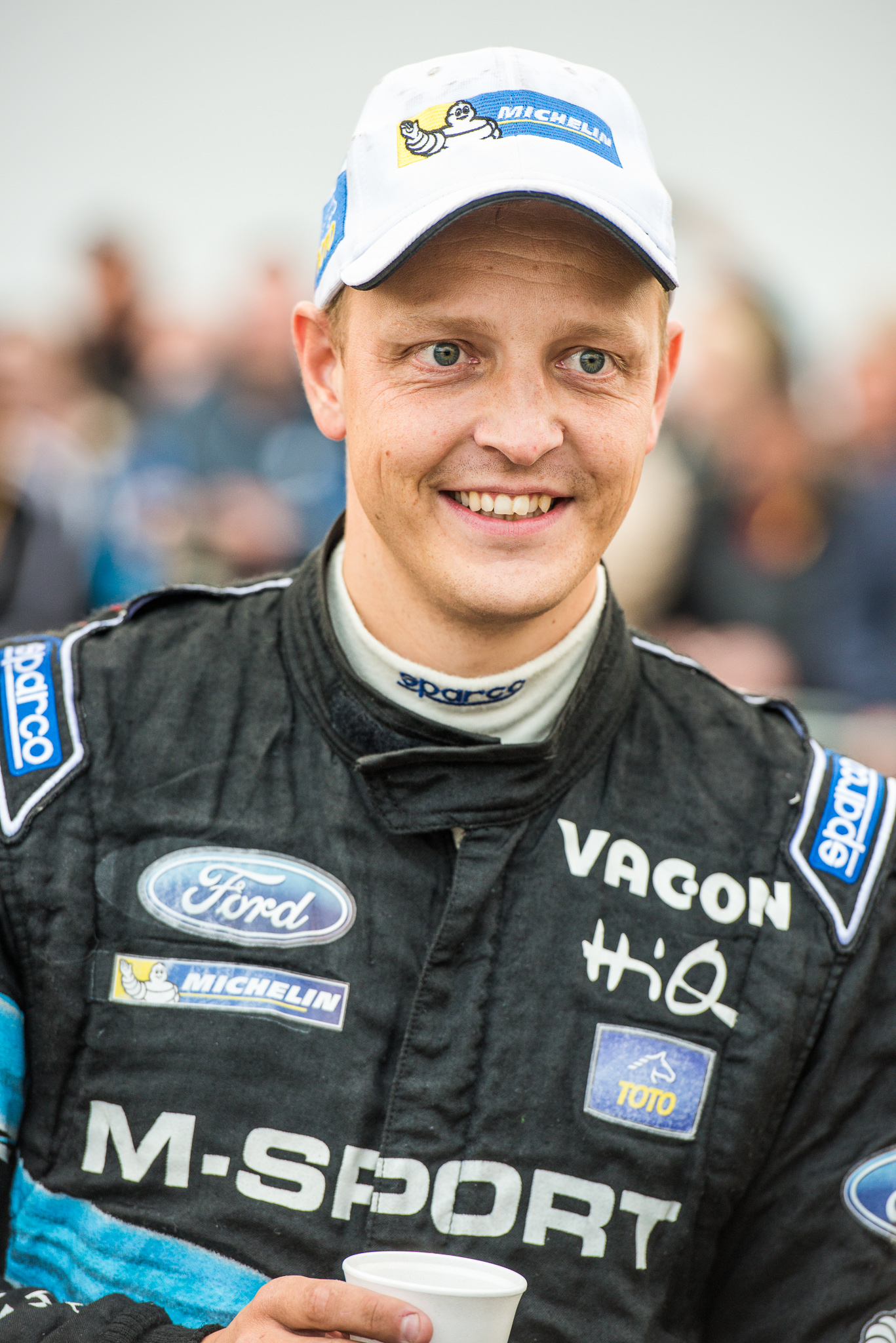
- Hirvonen in Germany, 2014.

Personal information
- Nationality: (Finland) Finnish
- Full name: Mikko Juhani Hirvonen Aaro
- Born: 31 July 1980 (age 46); Kannonkoski, Finland

World Rally Championship record
- Years active: 2002–2014
- Co-driver: (Finland) Jarmo Lehtinen (Finland) Miikka Anttila
- Teams: Citroën, Ford, Subaru, Škoda, M-Sport
- Rallies: 163
- Championships: 0
- Rally wins: 15
- Podiums: 69
- Stage wins: 260
- Total points: 1210
- First rally: 2002 Rally Finland
- First win: 2006 Rally Australia
- Last win: 2012 Rally Italia Sardegna
- Last rally: 2014 Wales Rally GB

Mikko Juhani Hirvonen Aaro (born 31 July 1980) is a Finnish former rally driver, and a current Rally-Raid driver, who drove in the World Rally Championship. He placed third in the drivers' championship and helped Ford to the manufacturers' title in both 2006 and 2007. In 2008, 2009, 2011, and 2012, he finished runner-up to Sébastien Loeb. Hirvonen's co-driver was Jarmo Lehtinen from the 2003 season until his retirement in 2014, Lehtinen had replaced Miikka Anttila who co-drove with Hirvonen in the 2002 season.

== Career ==
=== 2002–05 ===
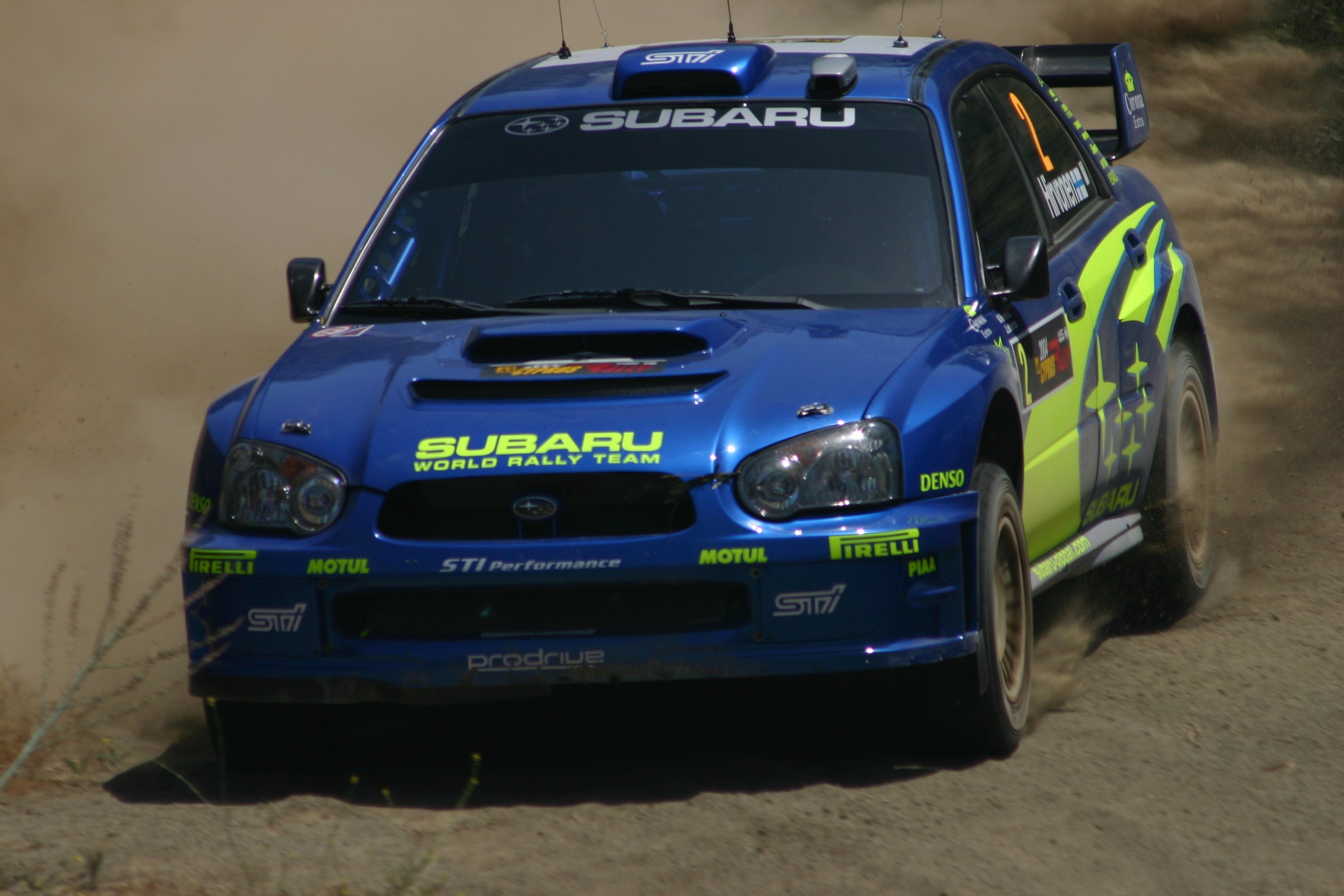
Hirvonen with a Subaru Impreza WRC at the 2004 Cyprus Rally.

Hirvonen won the under 2000 cc Group A Finnish Rally Championship in 2002. As one of the World Rally Championship's younger competitors he made his debut full-time in a third Ford World Rally Team entry in the 2003 season, scoring one points finish for sixth place at the Cyprus Rally.

After Richard Burns was diagnosed with brain tumor in late 2003, Hirvonen moved to take his place as team-mate to 2003 world champion Petter Solberg in 2004 for the Subaru World Rally Team. He scored points in ten rallies, but his best event result was only fourth, at the Rally Argentina and at the season-ending Rally Australia. These performances were not enough to secure a seat for the 2005 season. Hirvonen then campaigned a two-year-old Ford Focus RS WRC 03 and led one rally during the course of the year, and scored a career-best third-place finish at the Rally Catalunya as a privateer.

=== 2006–07 ===
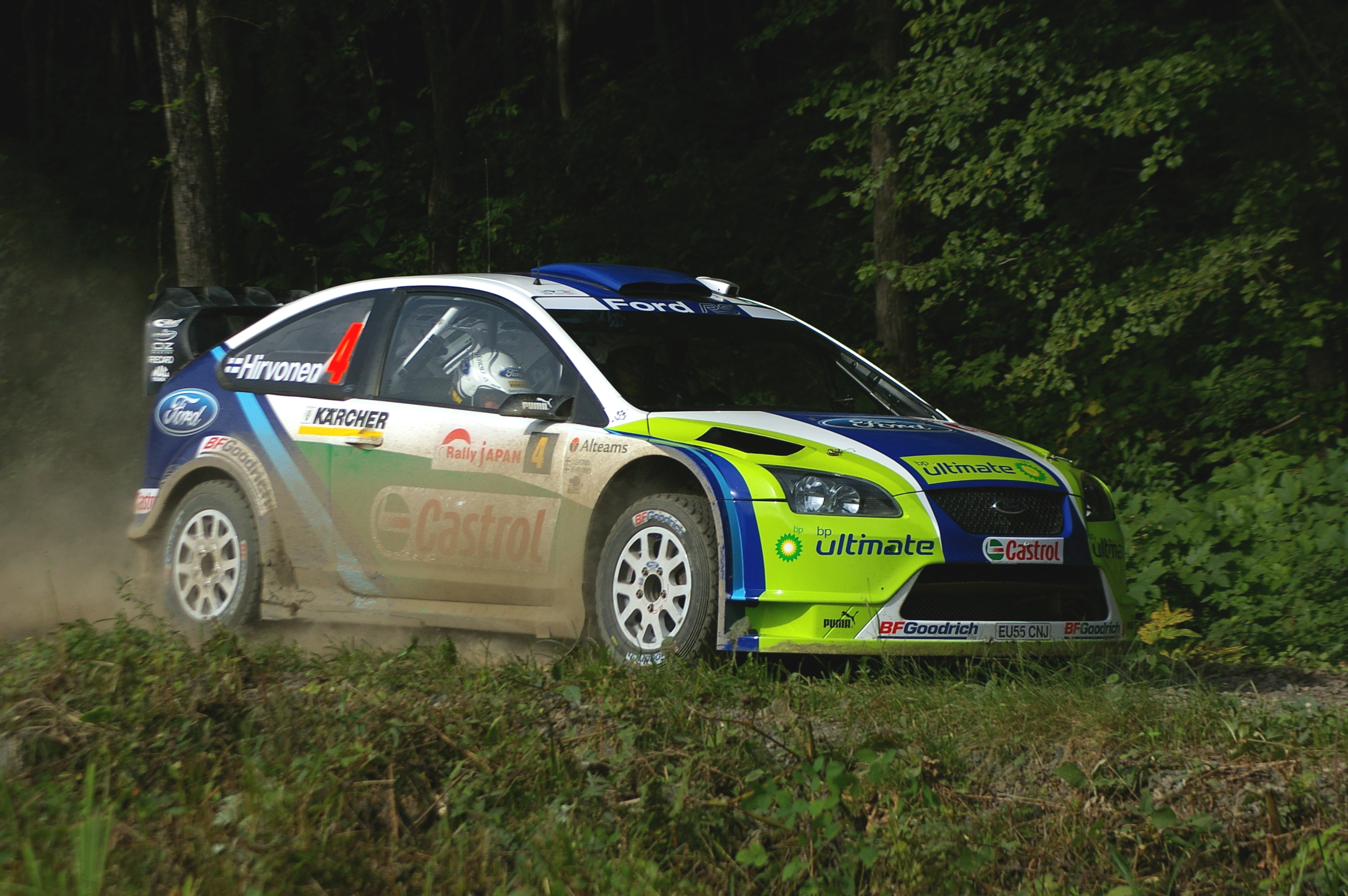
Hirvonen driving a Ford Focus RS WRC 06 at the 2006 Rally Japan.

It was Hirvonen's showings on such events that brought him back to the attention of Ford, whose factory arm signed him for the 2006 season. Hirvonen drove the new Ford Focus RS WRC 06 partnered with Marcus Grönholm. Hirvonen took his first World Rally Championship win at the Rally Australia, and placed second at the Rally d'Italia Sardegna, the Rally of Turkey and the Rally New Zealand. By finishing on the podium for six rallies in a row, he secured a third place overall in the drivers' world championship.

In the 2007 season, Hirvonen started with a fifth place at the 75ème Rallye Automobile de Monte-Carlo and a third place at the 56th Uddeholm Swedish Rally. He took his second WRC victory in Norway and later also won the 2007 Rally Japan and the season-ending 2007 Wales Rally GB. He finished third in the driver's championship, 17 points behind Sébastien Loeb. With Grönholm, Hirvonen secured the manufacturers' title for Ford for the second year in running.

=== 2008–14 ===
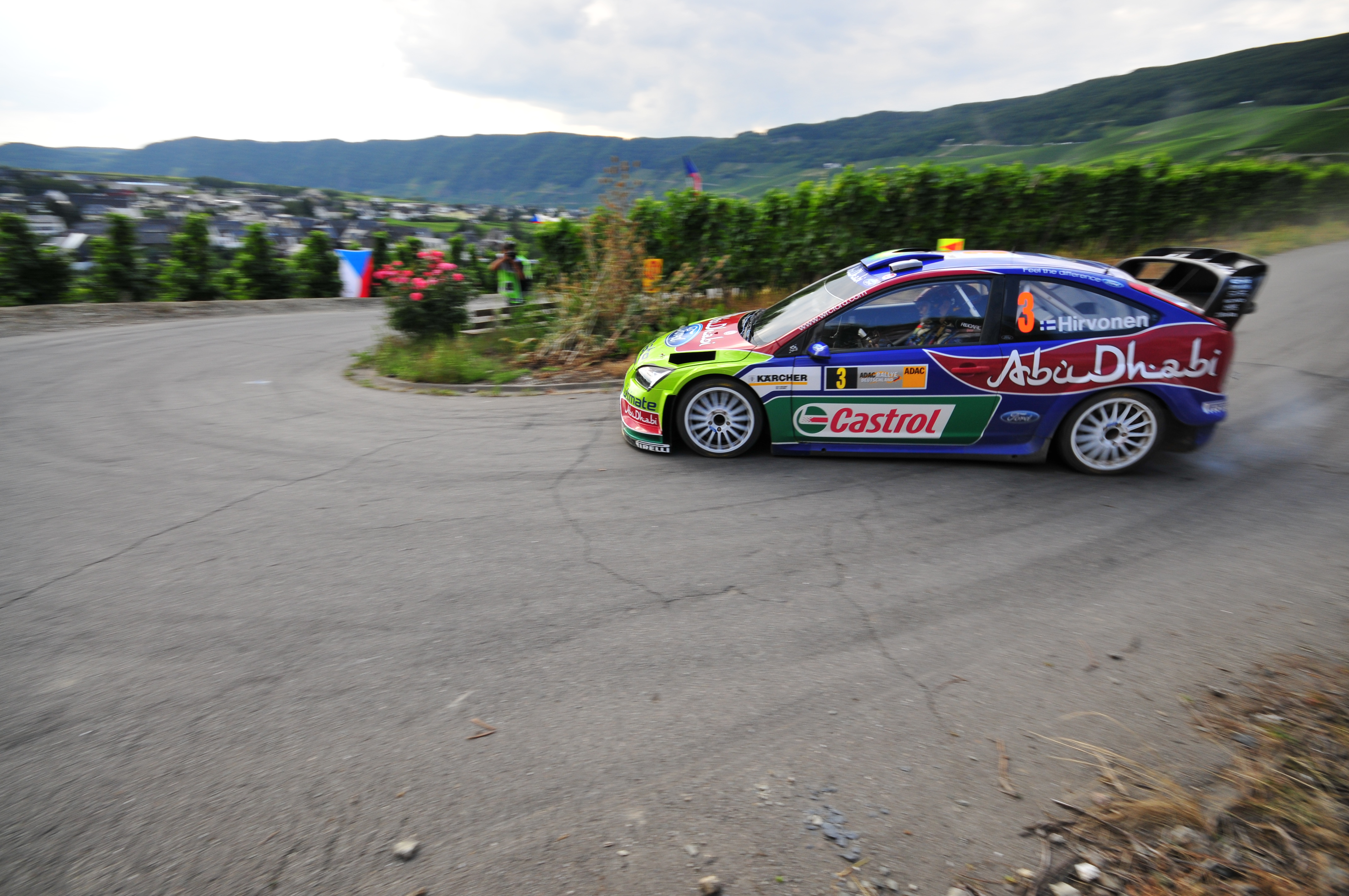
Hirvonen at the 2008 Rallye Deutschland.

On 17 December, Hirvonen was officially named as the number one BP-Ford Abu Dhabi factory driver for the 2008 season, after Marcus Grönholm's retirement. His young compatriot Jari-Matti Latvala was named his teammate in the second factory Focus. Hirvonen started the season with a second place at the 2008 Monte Carlo Rally, which was his and the BP-Ford Team's target. In Sweden, he was considered as favourite, but had to settle for second being unable to keep up with his younger teammate's pace. After Rally Mexico, where he had punctures and had to change a wheel, and in Rally Argentina, where he retired from the lead and then re-joined under SupeRally rules to take fifth place, Hirvonen took his first win of the season at the inaugural Jordan Rally.

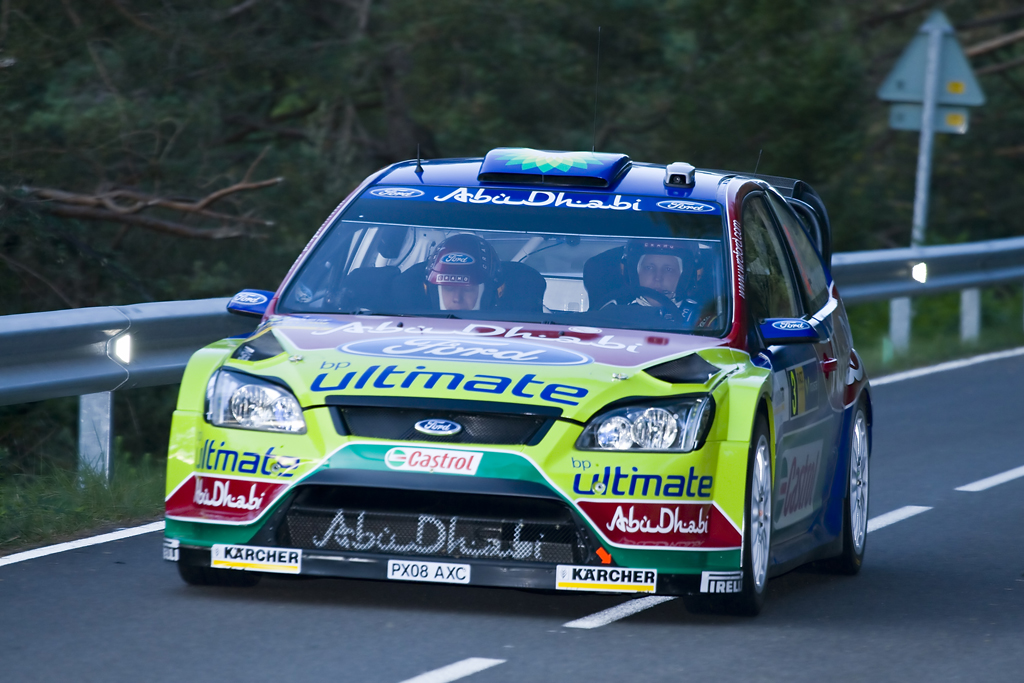
Hirvonen at the 2008 Rally Catalunya.

Hirvonen took his second victory of the season in Turkey. Despite being the favourite to win at his home event, the Rally Finland, he could not match the pace of his title rival Loeb and finished a close second. In New Zealand, Hirvonen was leading when he had a puncture and a spin on the penultimate stage, dropping him to third behind the Citroën drivers Loeb and Sordo. The stage was a disaster for Ford as Hirvonen's teammate Latvala and Stobart M-Sport Ford driver François Duval both crashed out from second and fifth place, respectively. Hirvonen then dropped eight points behind Loeb in the drivers' championship with only four more rallies to go.

Loeb soon secured his number one spot in the drivers' championship in Japan, but the manufacturers' title fight was still open as Ford trailed Citroën by eleven points. That changed when Hirvonen rolled his car onto its roof in stage five of the season-ending Wales Rally GB. He was bumped down to 44th as a result, but managed to recover to eighth place by the end of the rally. This result meant that Hirvonen and co-driver Lehtinen became the first WRC drivers ever to score points on every round of a season.

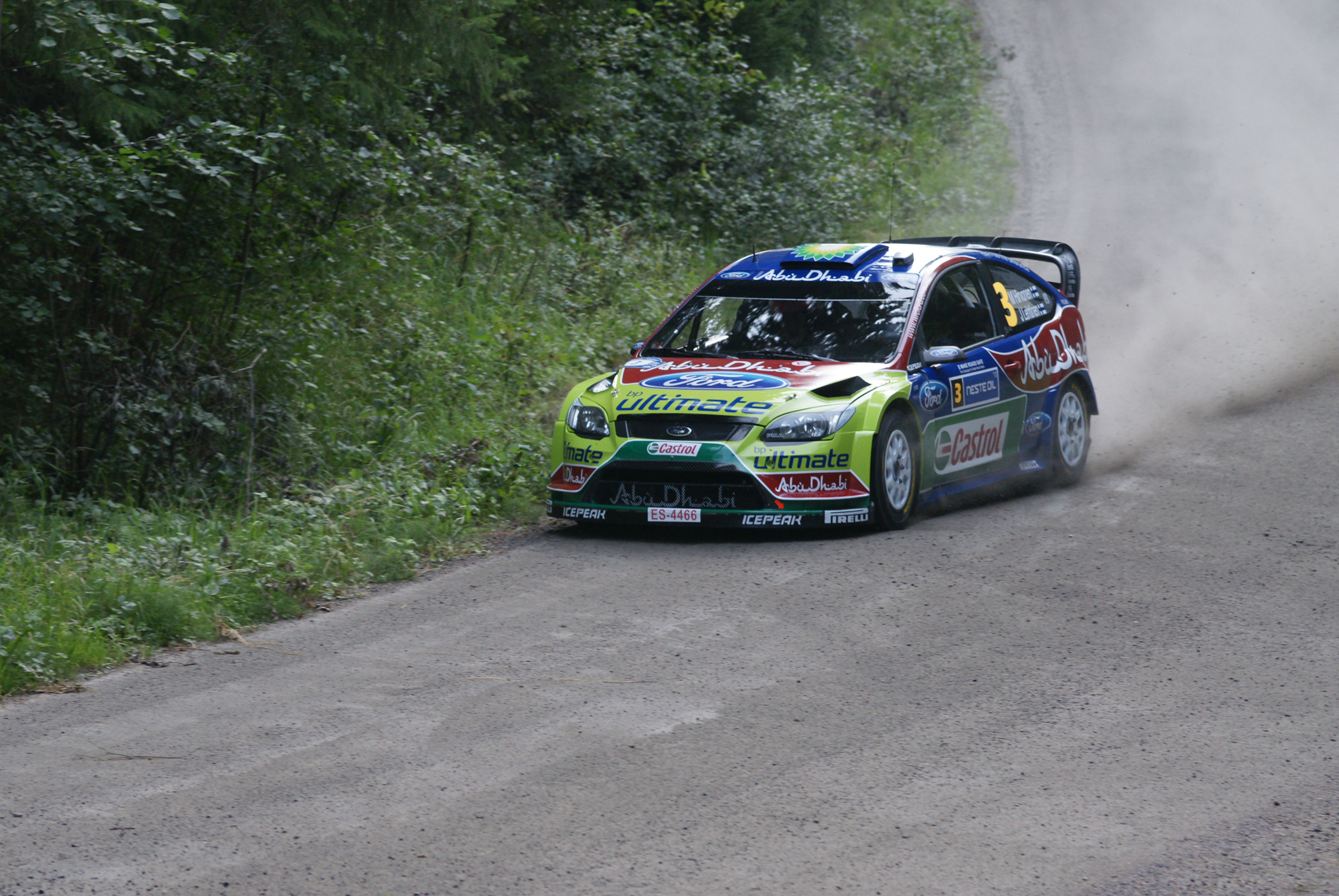
Hirvonen at the 2010 Rally Finland.

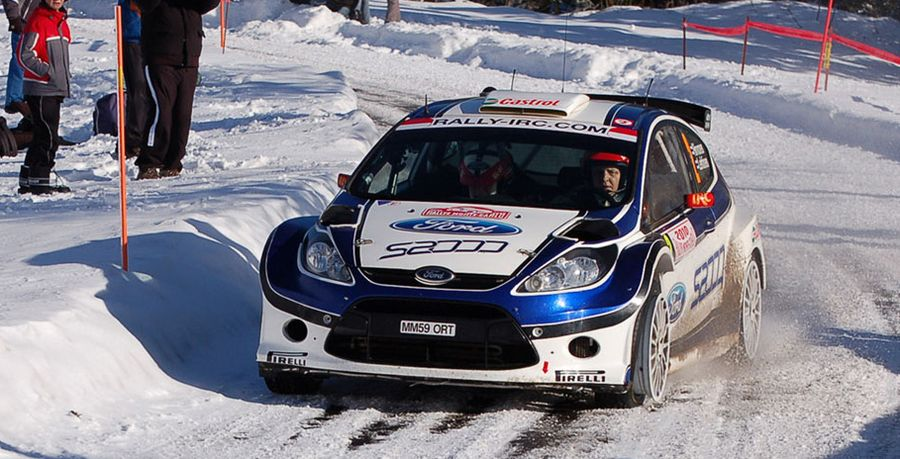
Hirvonen win Monte-Carlo (IRC) 2010 with new Fiesta S2000

Hirvonen started the 2009 season with a third place behind the Citroën duo at the Rally Ireland. At the Rally Norway, which he won in 2007, he narrowly lost the win to Loeb after a tight three-day battle. He went to finish second to Loeb also in the following two rallies in Cyprus and Portugal. In Portugal, Hirvonen tied the record for the longest points finish streak in the series (22 events) with his former teammate Marcus Grönholm. In the next round in Argentina, Hirvonen was six seconds behind Loeb after 14 stages when his Focus RS WRC incurred an engine problem. His retirement saw Loeb take a 20-point lead over him in the drivers' standings.

At the Rally d'Italia Sardegna, Hirvonen and Loeb both dropped time on day one in a bid to gain a better road position. After Loeb incurred a puncture, Hirvonen found himself unable to catch teammate Latvala, who had been pushing in front from start to finish. In the following Acropolis Rally in Greece, Hirvonen took his first win of the season. With Loeb crashing out, he reduced the Frenchman's championship lead to seven points. At the following Rally Poland, Loeb crashed again, although recovered to seventh, with Hirvonen winning his second consecutive rally he moved to the top of the standings. In Finland, Hirvonen took the lead on the first proper stage and continued pulling away from Loeb to take his debut win in his home event. A few weeks later, in Australia, Mikko was again in a tight battle with Loeb, where Loeb eventually won. Unfortunately for Loeb, his car was found to have rollbar irregularities, as did Dani Sordo and Sébastien Ogier. They were then given 1 minute time penalties, which handed Hirvonen the win and ten points. Hirvonen led the 2009 Championship by a point from Loeb, and needed a win to clinch the title, but a hard landing from a jump on the penultimate stage caused the bonnet hinge to fail, as time ticked by to get rid of the bonnet cover, the Championship was handed to Loeb.

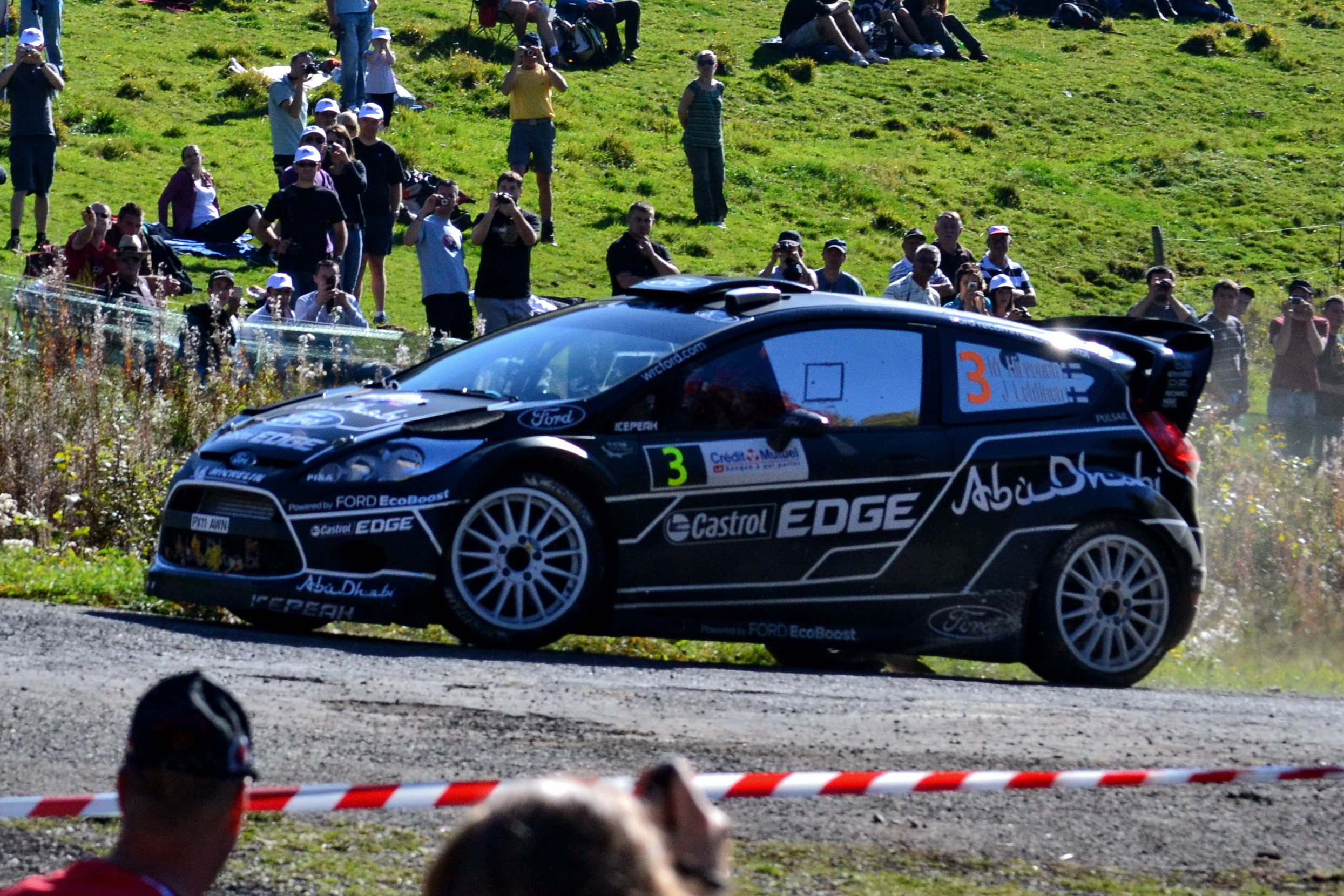
Hirvonen at the 2011 Rallye de France.

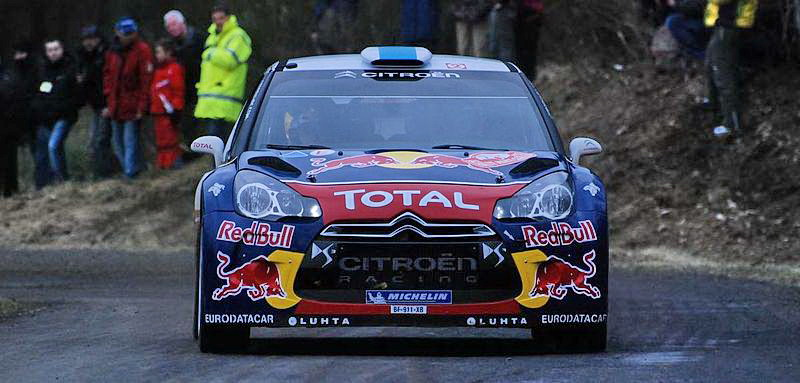
Hirvonen at Monte-Carlo 2012

In 2010, Hirvonen continued his partnership with Ford for the last time with the Ford Focus RS WRC before switching to the new 1.6 Ecoboost Ford Fiesta RS WRC in 2011. In 2012, Hirvonen changed his seat to a Citroën DS3 WRC to partner Sebastien Loeb in the Citroën Total World Rally Team. His first rally win for Citroën was the fourth rally of the 2012 season in Portugal to provisionally take the lead in the championship, but he was later disqualified from the event due to irregularities with the clutch and turbo in his Citroën DS3 WRC.

2013 was a disappointing year for Hirvonen, finishing on the podium just five times, collecting no wins. He ended the season with one of his biggest accidents ever in Wales. He finished the season in foourth place.

On 13 December 2013, it was confirmed Hirvonen would re-join M-Sport, formerly Ford for the 2014 season. The season was remarkably good for him, as he grabbed two podium places, and three power stage victories meant he was placed fourth in the championship, behind the dominant Volkswagen trio, Sebastien Ogier, Jari-Matti Latvala and Andreas Mikkelsen.

On 6 November 2014, it was announced that he would retire from the sport, moments before the start of the Wales Rally GB.

=== 2015-present ===
In 2015, Hirvonen began to compete in rally raid for X-Raid with a Mini Countryman, finishing third at the Baja Aragón with co-driver Michel Périn. In January 2016, he finished fourth at the 2016 Dakar Rally. In the 2016 FIA Cross Country Rally World Cup, Hirvonen won the Hungarian Baja and finished third at the eAbu Dhabi Desert Challenge and Baja Aragón, ranking fourth in the overall standings. He finished 13th at the 2017 Dakar Rally.

== WRC victories ==
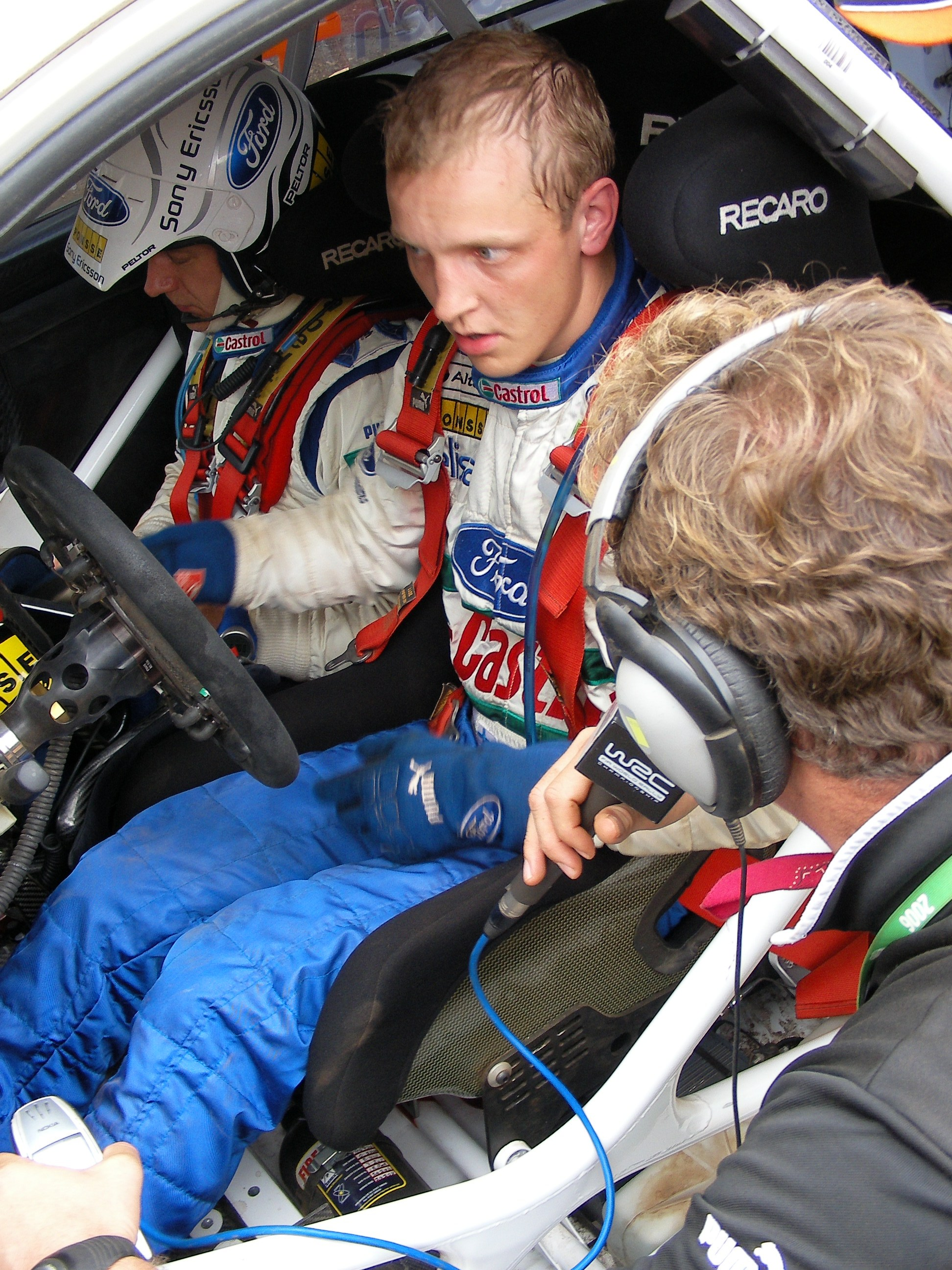
Hirvonen before his first win in Australia.

No.	Event	Season	Co-driver	Car
1	19th Telstra Rally Australia	2006	Jarmo Lehtinen	Ford Focus RS WRC 06
2	2nd Rally Norway	2007	Jarmo Lehtinen	Ford Focus RS WRC 06
3	4th Rally Japan	2007	Jarmo Lehtinen	Ford Focus RS WRC 07
4	(United Kingdom) 63rd Wales Rally of Great Britain	2007	Jarmo Lehtinen	Ford Focus RS WRC 07
5	26th Jordan Rally	2008	Jarmo Lehtinen	Ford Focus RS WRC 07
6	9th Rally of Turkey	2008	Jarmo Lehtinen	Ford Focus RS WRC 07
7	5th Rally Japan	2008	Jarmo Lehtinen	Ford Focus RS WRC 08
8	56th Acropolis Rally of Greece	2009	Jarmo Lehtinen	Ford Focus RS WRC 09
9	66th Rally of Poland	2009	Jarmo Lehtinen	Ford Focus RS WRC 09
10	59th Neste Oil Rally Finland	2009	Jarmo Lehtinen	Ford Focus RS WRC 09
11	20th Repco Rally Australia	2009	Jarmo Lehtinen	Ford Focus RS WRC 09
12	58th Rally Sweden	2010	Jarmo Lehtinen	Ford Focus RS WRC 09
13	59th Rally Sweden	2011	Jarmo Lehtinen	Ford Fiesta RS WRC
14	21st Rally Australia	2011	Jarmo Lehtinen	Ford Fiesta RS WRC
15	(Italy) 9º Rally d'Italia Sardegna	2012	Jarmo Lehtinen	Citroën DS3 WRC

== IRC victories ==
No.	Event	Season	Co-driver	Car
1	(Monaco) 78ème Rallye Automobile de Monte-Carlo	2010	Jarmo Lehtinen	Ford Fiesta S2000

== Career results ==
=== Complete WRC results ===
Year	Entrant	Car	1	2	3	4	5	6	7	8	9	10	11	12	13	14	15	16	Pos	Points
2002	Mikko Hirvonen	Renault Clio S1600	MON	SWE	FRA	ESP	CYP	ARG	GRC	KEN	FIN; 21	GER	ITA; Ret	NZL	AUS				NC	0
2002	Mikko Hirvonen	Subaru Impreza WRC														GBR; Ret			NC	0
2003	Ford Motor Co	Ford Focus RS WRC 02	MON; Ret	SWE; 11	TUR; Ret		ARG; 16	GRC; Ret	CYP; 6	GER; 13	FIN; Ret	AUS; 9				GBR; Ret			16th	3
2003	Ford Motor Co	Ford Focus RS WRC 03				NZL; 10							ITA; Ret	FRA; 10	ESP; 14				16th	3
2004	555 Subaru WRT	Subaru Impreza WRC 03	MON; Ret	SWE; 9															7th	29
2004	555 Subaru WRT	Subaru Impreza WRC 04			MEX; 5	NZL; 7	CYP; 5	GRC; Ret	TUR; 6	ARG; 4	FIN; Ret	GER; 8	JPN; 7	GBR; 7	ITA; Ret	FRA; 10	ESP; 8	AUS; 4	7th	29
2005	Mikko Hirvonen	Ford Focus RS WRC 03	MON	SWE; Ret	MEX	NZL	ITA; Ret	CYP	TUR	GRC; 5	ARG		GER	GBR		FRA	ESP; 3	AUS	10th	14
2005	BP Ford WRT	Ford Focus RS WRC 04										FIN; 5							10th	14
2005	Škoda Motorsport	Škoda Fabia WRC													JPN; Ret				10th	14
2006	BP Ford WRT	Ford Focus RS WRC 06	MON; 7	SWE; 12	MEX; 14	ESP; 9	FRA; 4	ARG; Ret	ITA; 2	GRC; 3	GER; 9	FIN; 3	JPN; 3	CYP; 3	TUR; 2	AUS; 1	NZL; 2	GBR; Ret	3rd	65
2007	BP Ford WRT	Ford Focus RS WRC 06	MON; 5	SWE; 3	NOR; 1	MEX; 3	POR; 5	ARG; 3	ITA; 2	GRC; 4									3rd	99
2007	BP Ford WRT	Ford Focus RS WRC 07									FIN; 2	GER; 3	NZL; 3	ESP; 4	FRA; 13	JPN; 1	IRE; 4	GBR; 1	3rd	99
2008	BP Ford Abu Dhabi WRT	Ford Focus RS WRC 07	MON; 2	SWE; 2	MEX; 4	ARG; 5	JOR; 1	ITA; 2	GRC; 3	TUR; 1	FIN; 2								2nd	103
2008	BP Ford Abu Dhabi WRT	Ford Focus RS WRC 08										GER; 4	NZL; 3	ESP; 3	FRA; 2	JPN; 1	GBR; 8		2nd	103
2009	BP Ford Abu Dhabi WRT	Ford Focus RS WRC 08	IRE; 3	NOR; 2	CYP; 2	POR; 2	ARG; Ret												2nd	92
2009	BP Ford Abu Dhabi WRT	Ford Focus RS WRC 09						ITA; 2	GRE; 1	POL; 1	FIN; 1	AUS; 1	ESP; 3	GBR; 2					2nd	92
2010	BP Ford Abu Dhabi WRT	Ford Focus RS WRC 09	SWE; 1	MEX; 4	JOR; 20	TUR; 3	NZL; 4	POR; 4	BUL; 5	FIN; Ret	GER; Ret	JPN; 6	FRA; 5	ESP; 5	GBR; 4				6th	126
2011	Ford Abu Dhabi WRT	Ford Fiesta RS WRC	SWE; 1	MEX; 2	POR; 4	JOR; 4	ITA; 2	ARG; 2	GRE; 3	FIN; 4	GER; 4	AUS; 1	FRA; 3	ESP; 2	GBR; Ret				2nd	214
2012	Citroën Total WRT	Citroën DS3 WRC	MON; 4	SWE; 2	MEX; 2	POR; DSQ	ARG; 2	GRE; 2	NZL; 2	FIN; 2	GER; 3	GBR; 5	FRA; 3	ITA; 1	ESP; 3				2nd	213
2013	Citroën Total Abu Dhabi WRT	Citroën DS3 WRC	MON; 4	SWE; 17	MEX; 2	POR; 2	ARG; 6	GRE; 8	ITA; Ret	FIN; 4	GER; 3	AUS; 3	FRA; 6	ESP; 3	GBR; Ret				4th	126
2014	M-Sport WRT	Ford Fiesta RS WRC	MON; Ret	SWE; 4	MEX; 8	POR; 2	ARG; 9	ITA; Ret	POL; 4	FIN; 5	GER; 5	AUS; 5	FRA; 5	ESP; 3	GBR; 2				4th	126

=== IRC results ===
Year	Entrant	Car	1	2	3	4	5	6	7	8	9	10	11	12	Pos	Points
2010	M-Sport Ltd.	Ford Fiesta S2000	MON; 1	BRA	ARG	CAN	ITA	BEL	AZO	MAD	CZE	ITA	SCO	CYP	11th	10

=== ERC results ===
Year	Entrant	Car	1	2	3	4	5	6	7	8	Pos	Points
2019	MM Motorsport	Ford Fiesta R5	AZO	CAN	LIE	POL	RMC	CZE	CYP; 3	HUN	20th	21

== Dakar Rally results ==
Year	Class	Vehicle	Position	Stages won
2016	Cars	(United Kingdom) Mini	4th	1
2017	Cars	(United Kingdom) Mini	13th	0
2018	Cars	(United Kingdom) Mini	19th	0

Awards and achievements
Preceded by Sébastien Loeb	Autosport; International Rally Driver Award; 2009	Succeeded by Sébastien Loeb
