= Cato Menkerud =

Norwegian rally co-driver (born 1973)

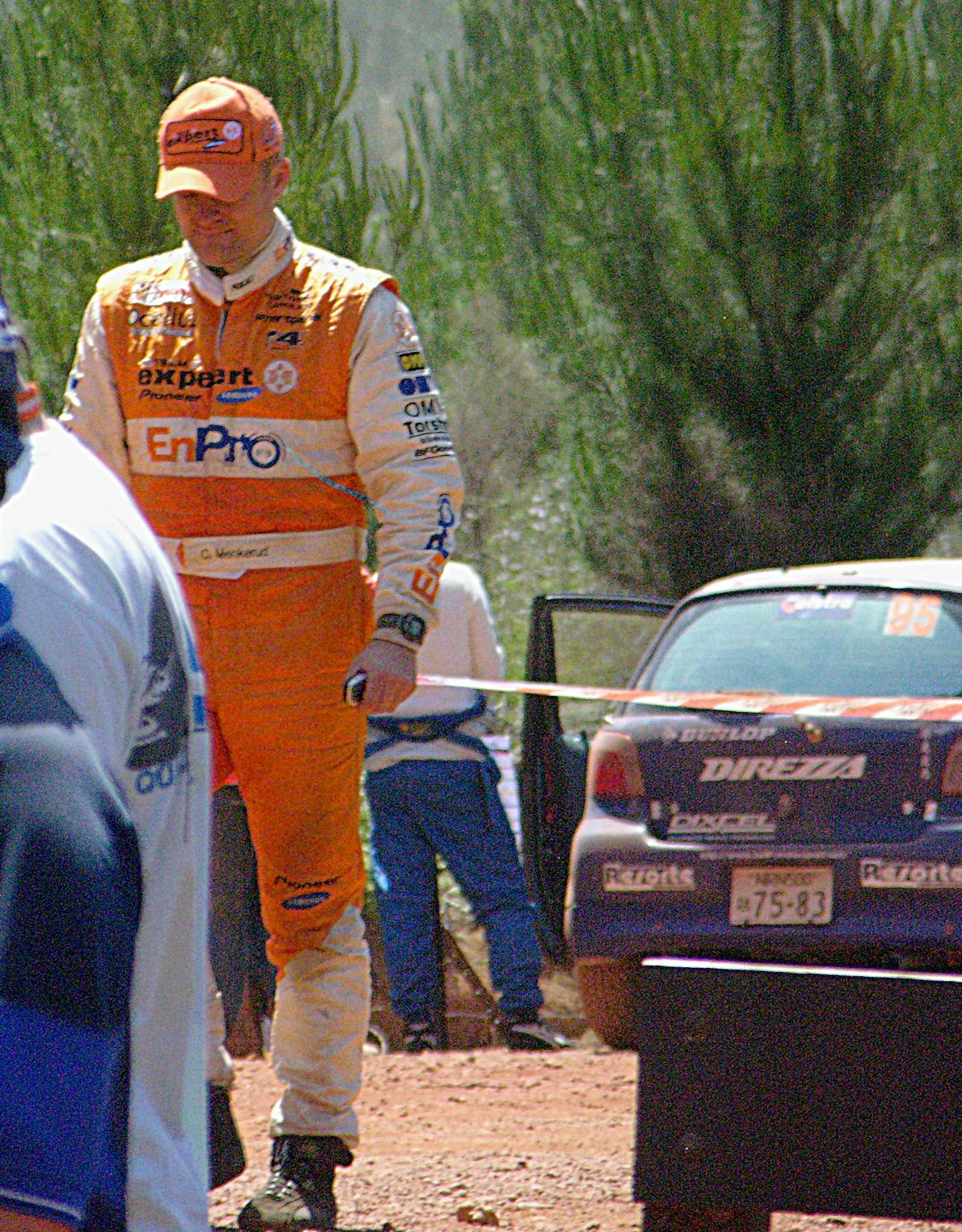
- Menkerud in 2006

Personal information
- Nationality: (Norway) Norwegian
- Born: 23 August 1973 (age 53); Lillehammer, Norway

World Rally Championship record
- Years active: 1993, 1996, 1998, 2000–2012, 2017–2018
- Driver: (Norway) Helge Menkerud (Norway) Birger Gundersen (Norway) Petter Solberg (Norway) Henning Solberg (Norway) Alexander Foss (Norway) Eyvind Brynildsen
- Rallies: 97
- Rally wins: 0
- Podiums: 5
- Stage wins: 31
- First rally: 1993 Swedish Rally
- Last rally: 2018 Rally Sweden

Cato Menkerud (born 23 August 1973 in Lillehammer, Norway) is a rally co-driver. He started as a co-driver in 1992 for his father Helge Menkerud. In addition to Henning Solberg, he has co-driven for Petter Solberg, Birger Gundersen, Thomas Kolberg, Alexander Foss and Henrik Lundgaard. After the 2009 World Rally Championship season, Menkerud split from Henning Solberg, and became the co-driver for Eyvind Brynildsen. In addition to being a co-driver, he runs a gas station in Lillehammer, where he lives. He is married to Charlotte.

== Achievements ==
- 1997 – Gold in Norwegian Championship together with Birger Gundersen
- 1998 – Silver in South Swedish Rally and Rally Lebanon
- 2002 – Gold in South Swedish Rally
- 2002 and 2003 – Gold in Norwegian Championship together with Henning Solberg
