= Abu Dhabi Total World Rally Team =

2016 World Rally Championship manufacturer team

- Full name: Abu Dhabi Total World Rally Team
- Base: Versailles, France
- Chassis: Citroën DS3 WRC
- Tyres: Michelin

World Rally Championship history
- Debut: 2016 Monte Carlo Rally
- Last event: 2016 Wales Rally GB
- Manufacturers' Championships: 0
- Drivers' Championships: 0
- Rally wins: 2

Abu Dhabi Total World Rally Team was a semi-private rally team that competed in the World Rally Championship in the 2016 season.

The team was approved by Citroën Racing and run by its customer racing partner, PH Sport. The team was supported by Abu Dhabi Racing, and its chairman Khalid Al-Qassimi was also a competitor with the team on some rallies during the season.

== History ==
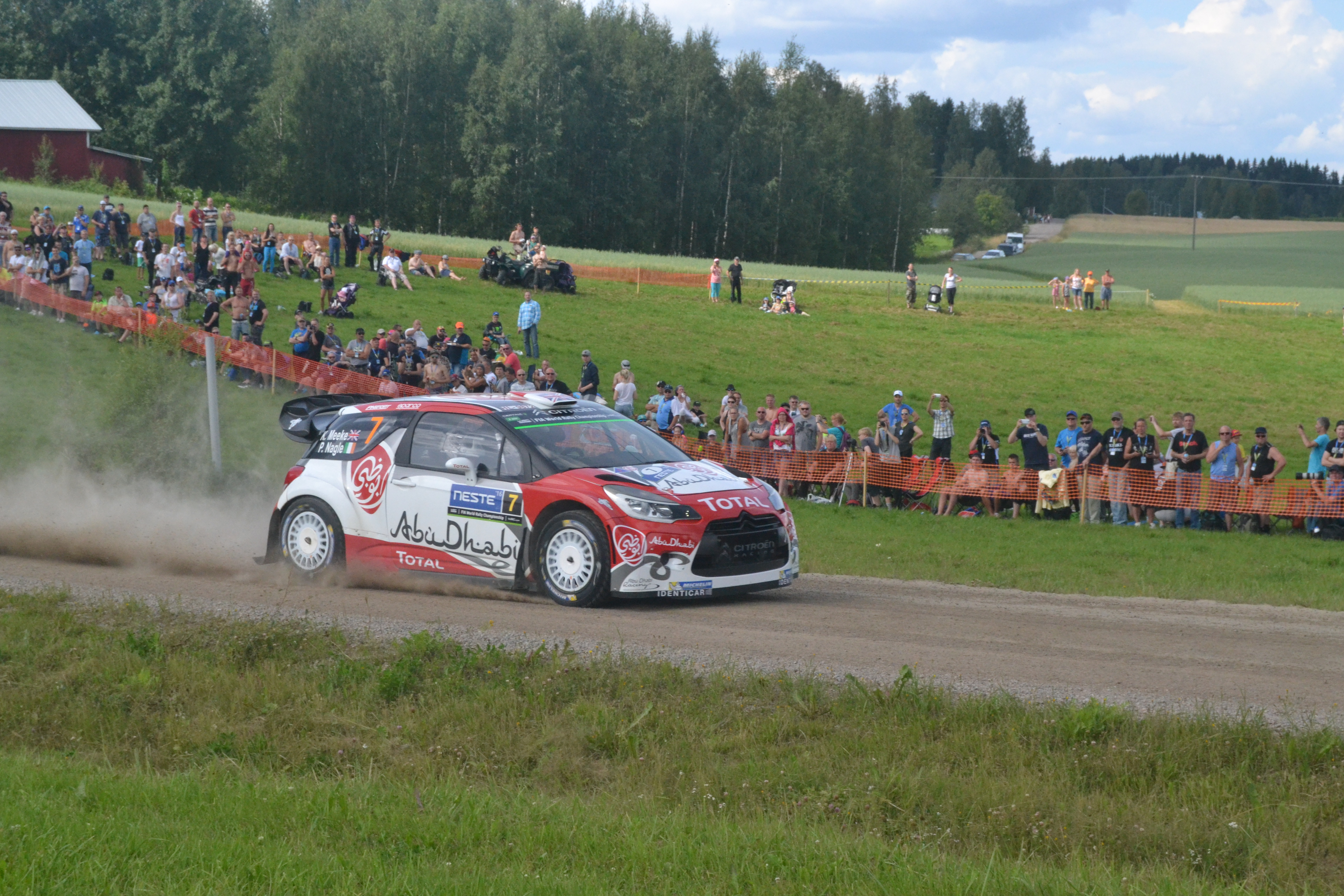
Kris Meeke, Rally Finland 2016

Citroën withdrew its World Rally Team from the WRC in 2016 in order to focus resources on developing a new regulation car for use in the 2017 season onwards. Although, they continued to support the team unofficially, asking PH Sport to run the Abu Dhabi Total WRT on most events with drivers Kris Meeke, Craig Breen and Khalid Al-Qassimi, with occasional drives from Stephane Lefebvre, Marcos Ligato, Quentin Gilbert and José Alberto Nicolas. Meeke's win in Rally Finland at 126.6 km/h (78.7 mph) set the record for the fastest average speed in the history of the World Rally Championship. This record remains as of February 2023.

With Citroën's decision to take a sabbatical as works team in preparations for 2017 PH-Sport took over as the manufacturer's de facto leading team. Competing under the Abu Dhabi Total World Rally Team the team competed in selected events with Kris Meeke as their leading driver, while at some events the other cars were shared between Stéphane Lefebvre, Craig Breen and Khalid Al-Qassimi. The team however was not registered as a manufacturer team and therefore was not eligible to score manufacturer points.

=== WRC Results ===
Year	Entrant	Car	No	Driver	1	2	3	4	5	6	7	8	9	10	11	12	13	14	WDC	Points	WMC	Points
2016	Abu Dhabi Total World Rally Team	Citroën DS3 WRC	7	Kris Meeke	MON; Ret	SWE; 23	MEX	ARG	POR; 1	ITA		FIN; 1	GER	CHN; C	FRA; 16	ESP; Ret	GBR; 5	AUS	9th	64	–	–
2016	Abu Dhabi Total World Rally Team	Citroën DS3 WRC	7	Stéphane Lefebvre							POL; 9								13th	14	–	–
2016	Abu Dhabi Total World Rally Team	Citroën DS3 WRC	8	Stéphane Lefebvre	MON; 5	SWE	MEX	ARG	POR; 35	ITA								AUS	13th	14	–	–
2016	Abu Dhabi Total World Rally Team	Citroën DS3 WRC	8	Craig Breen							POL; 7	FIN; 3	GER	CHN; C	FRA; 10	ESP; Ret	GBR; Ret		10th	36	–	–
2016	Abu Dhabi Total World Rally Team	Citroën DS3 WRC	14	Khalid Al-Qassimi	MON	SWE; 19	MEX	ARG	POR; 26	ITA	POL	FIN; 16	GER	CHN; C	FRA	ESP; 12		AUS	NC	0	–	–
2016	Abu Dhabi Total World Rally Team	Citroën DS3 WRC	14	Stéphane Lefebvre													GBR; 9		13th	14	–	–
2016	Abu Dhabi Total World Rally Team	Citroën DS3 WRC	15	Craig Breen	MON	SWE; 8	MEX	ARG	POR	ITA							GBR	AUS	10th	36	–	–
2016	Abu Dhabi Total World Rally Team	Citroën DS3 WRC	16	Quentin Gilbert	MON	SWE	MEX	ARG	POR	ITA	POL	FIN	GER	CHN; C	FRA	ESP	GBR; 17	AUS	NC	0	–	–

== See also ==
- Citroën Racing
- Citroën World Rally Team
- Citroën Junior Team
- PH Sport
