= 2009 World Rally Championship =

37th season of the FIA World Rally Championship

Champions
- World Drivers' Champion: Sébastien Loeb
- World Manufacturers' Champion: Citroën

Seasons
- ← 2008 2010 →

The 2009 World Rally Championship was the 37th season of the FIA World Rally Championship. The season consisted of twelve rallies and began on 30 January, with Rally Ireland and ended with Rally GB on 25 October. Sébastien Loeb won the World Drivers' championship at Rally GB by one point from Mikko Hirvonen, taking his sixth consecutive crown. Citroën secured their fifth Manufacturers' title, Martin Prokop won the JWRC Drivers' championship and Armindo Araujo won the PWRC Drivers' championship.

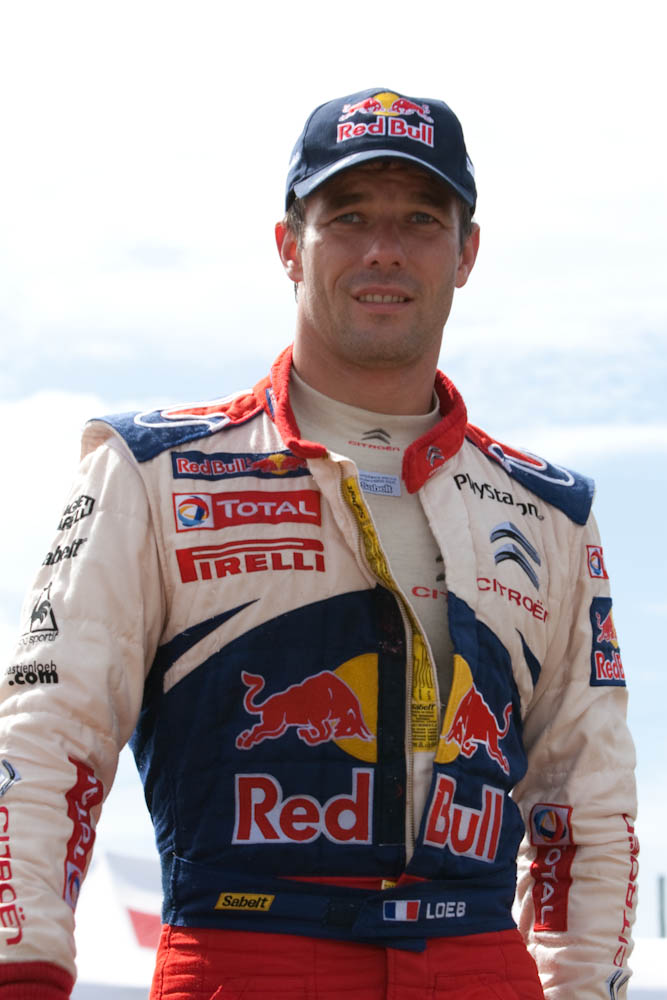
Sébastien Loeb clinched a sixth successive WRC drivers' championship title.

== Regulation changes ==
The number of mechanics available per car has been dropped from 12 to 8.

== Calendar ==
The 2009 championship was contested over twelve rounds in Europe, South America and Oceania.

Rd.	Start date	Finish date	Rally	Rally headquarters	Surface	Stages	Distance	Support class
1	30 January	1 February	(Republic of Ireland) 4th Rally Ireland	Sligo, Connacht	Tarmac	19	349.73 km	JWRC
2	12 February	15 February	23rd Rally Norway	Hamar, Innlandet	Snow	23	360.90 km	PWRC
3	13 March	15 March	37th FxPro Cyprus Rally	Lemesos, Limassol District	Mixed	14	332.07 km	PWRC/JWRC
4	2 April	5 April	43rd Vodafone Rally de Portugal	Almancil, Algarve	Gravel	18	361.36 km	PWRC/JWRC
5	23 April	26 April	29th Rally Argentina	Carlos Paz, Córdoba	Gravel	23	331.80 km	PWRC/JWRC
6	22 May	24 May	(Italy) 6th Rally d'Italia Sardinia	Olbia, Sardinia	Gravel	17	347.12 km	PWRC/JWRC
7	12 June	14 June	56th Acropolis Rally of Greece	Loutraki, Corinthia	Gravel	17	371.02 km	PWRC
8	25 June	28 June	66th Orlen Platinum Rally Poland - Rajd Polski	Mikołajki, Mrągowo County	Gravel	18	352.00 km	JWRC
9	30 July	2 August	59th Neste Oil Rally Finland	Jyväskylä, Central Finland	Gravel	23	345.15 km	JWRC
10	3 September	6 September	20th Repco Rally Australia	Kingscliff, New South Wales	Gravel	35	344.72 km	PWRC
11	2 October	4 October	(Spain) 45th RallyRACC Catalunya - Costa Daurada	Salou, Catalonia	Tarmac	18	353.62 km	JWRC
12	23 October	25 October	(United Kingdom) 65th Rally of Great Britain	Cardiff, Wales	Gravel	16	348.30 km	PWRC

=== Calendar changes ===
The 2009 season included twelve rallies, which was three fewer than the 2008 season, because the FIA imposed a "Round Rotation" System in order to attract candidate rallies to have a chance to be a WRC event. Monte Carlo, Sweden, Mexico, Jordan, Turkey, Germany, New Zealand, France and Japan were dropped from the calendar for 2009, but will return at the 2010 WRC Season. Ireland, Norway, Cyprus, Portugal, Poland and Australia returned to the 2009 season.

The eight events also part of the Production World Rally Championship were Norway, Cyprus, Portugal, Argentina, Italy, Greece, Australia and Rally GB. The eight rallies also on the Junior World Rally Championship schedule were Ireland, Cyprus, Portugal, Argentina, Italy, Poland, Finland and Spain.

== Teams and drivers ==
In 2009 two categories are eligible to compete for the Manufacturer's championship:

Manufacturer (M)

- must take part in all the rallies of the Championship with two cars of the same make
- must enter only cars corresponding to the latest homologated version of a World Rally Car in conformity with the 2009 Appendix J
- must inform the FIA of the name of the first driver entered for the season at the time of registration for the Championship. No change of the first driver is authorised, except in a case of force majeure. The driver of the second car may be changed for each of the rallies in the Championship

Manufacturer Team (MT)

- must take part in a minimum of 8 Championship rallies with one or two cars; those rallies must be nominated on registering for the Championship
- cannot enter World Rally Cars homologated during the year 2009 and cannot use parts homologated after 2 January 2009
- can only score points in the events it nominated on registering.

The registered Manufacturers are Citroën Total World Rally Team and BP Ford Abu Dhabi World Rally Team; the registered Manufacturer Teams are Stobart VK M-Sport Ford, Munchi's Ford and Citroën Junior Team.

All teams ran Pirelli tyres.

World Rally Car entries eligible to score manufacturer points
Manufacturer	Car	Team	Tyre	No	Drivers	Co-drivers	Rounds
Citroën	C4 WRC	(France) Citroën Total World Rally Team	P	1	(France) Sébastien Loeb	(Monaco) Daniel Elena	All
Citroën	C4 WRC	(France) Citroën Total World Rally Team	P	2	(Spain) Daniel Sordo	(Spain) Marc Marti	All
Ford	Focus RS WRC 08 1-5; Focus RS WRC 09 6-12	(United Kingdom) BP Ford Abu Dhabi World Rally Team	P	3	(Finland) Mikko Hirvonen	(Finland) Jarmo Lehtinen	All
Ford	Focus RS WRC 08 1-5; Focus RS WRC 09 6-12	(United Kingdom) BP Ford Abu Dhabi World Rally Team	P	4	(Finland) Jari-Matti Latvala	(Finland) Miikka Anttila	All
World Rally Car entries eligible to score manufacturer team points
Ford	Focus RS WRC 08	(United Kingdom) Stobart VK M-Sport Ford Rally Team	P	5	(Estonia) Urmo Aava	(Estonia) Kuldar Sikk	1–2
Ford	Focus RS WRC 08	(United Kingdom) Stobart VK M-Sport Ford Rally Team	P	5	(United Kingdom) Matthew Wilson	(United Kingdom) Scott Martin	3–12
Ford	Focus RS WRC 08	(United Kingdom) Stobart VK M-Sport Ford Rally Team	P	6	(Norway) Henning Solberg	(Norway) Cato Menkerud	All
Ford	Focus RS WRC 08	(Argentina) Munchi's Ford World Rally Team	P	9	(Argentina) Federico Villagra	(Argentina) Jorge Perez Companc	3, 5–6, 9–11
Ford	Focus RS WRC 08	(Argentina) Munchi's Ford World Rally Team	P	9	(Argentina) Federico Villagra	(Argentina) José Díaz	4, 7
Citroën	C4 WRC	(France) Citroën Junior Team	P	7	(Australia) Chris Atkinson	(Belgium) Stéphane Prévot	1
Citroën	C4 WRC	(France) Citroën Junior Team	P	7	(Russia) Evgenij Novikov	(Australia) Dale Moscatt	2–4, 6–9
Citroën	C4 WRC	(France) Citroën Junior Team	P	8	(Zimbabwe) Conrad Rautenbach	(United Kingdom) Daniel Barritt	All
Citroën	C4 WRC	(France) Citroën Junior Team	P	12	(France) Sébastien Ogier	(France) Julien Ingrassia	2-12

World Rally Car entries ineligible to score manufacturer points
Manufacturer	Car	Team	Tyre	Drivers	Co-drivers	Rounds
Citroën	C4 WRC	(France) Citroën Junior Team	P	(Russia) Evgenij Novikov	(Belgium) Stéphane Prévot	11
Citroën	C4 WRC	(France) Citroën Junior Team	P	(France) Sébastien Ogier	(France) Julien Ingrassia	1
Citroën	C4 WRC	(France) Citroën Junior Team	P	(Germany) Aaron Burkart	(Germany) Michael Kölbach	12
Citroën	C4 WRC	(Norway) Petter Solberg World Rally Team	P	(Norway) Petter Solberg	(United Kingdom) Phil Mills	11-12
Citroën	Xsara WRC	(Norway) Petter Solberg World Rally Team	P	(Norway) Petter Solberg	(United Kingdom) Phil Mills	2–9
Ford	Focus RS WRC 08	(United Kingdom) BP Ford Abu Dhabi World Rally Team	P	(United Arab Emirates) Khalid Al Qassimi	(United Kingdom) Michael Orr	1, 3–4, 6–7, 9–12
Ford	Focus RS WRC 08	(United Kingdom) Stobart VK M-Sport Ford Rally Team	P	(United Kingdom) Matthew Wilson	(United Kingdom) Scott Martin	1–2
Ford	Focus RS WRC 08	(United Kingdom) Stobart VK M-Sport Ford Rally Team	P	(Poland) Krzysztof Holowczyc	(Poland) Lukasz Kurzeja	8
Ford	Focus RS WRC 08	(United Kingdom) Stobart VK M-Sport Ford Rally Team	P	(United Kingdom) Steve Perez	(United Kingdom) Paul Spooner	12
Ford	Focus RS WRC 08	(United Kingdom) Stobart VK M-Sport Ford Rally Team	P	(United Kingdom) Paul Bird	(United Kingdom) Ian Windress	11
Ford	Focus RS WRC 08	(Argentina) Munchi's Ford World Rally Team	P	(Finland) Matti Rantanen	(Finland) Mikko Lukka	9
Ford	Focus RS WRC 08	(Argentina) Munchi's Ford World Rally Team	P	(Finland) Mattias Therman	(Finland) Janne Perälä	9
Ford	Focus RS WRC 07	(Netherlands) Van Merksteijn Motorsport	P	(Netherlands) Peter Van Merksteijn, Sr.	(Belgium) Erwin Mombaerts	2
Ford	Focus RS WRC 07	(Netherlands) Van Merksteijn Motorsport		(Netherlands) Peter Van Merksteijn, Sr.	(Netherlands) Hans van Goor	4
Ford	Focus RS WRC 06	(Netherlands) Van Merksteijn Motorsport	P	(Netherlands) Peter Van Merksteijn, Jr.	(Belgium) Eddy Chevaillier	2, 4
Ford	Focus RS WRC 06	(Netherlands) Ipatec Racing	P	(Netherlands) Dennis Kuipers	(Netherlands) Kees Hagman	4, 12
Ford	Focus RS WRC 06	(Netherlands) Ipatec Racing	P	(Netherlands) René Kuipers	(Netherlands) Erwin Berkhof	4
Ford	Focus RS WRC 06	(Netherlands) Ipatec Racing		(Netherlands) René Kuipers	(Belgium) Erwin Mombaerts	12
Ford	Focus RS WRC 06	(United Kingdom) Peter Stephenson		(United Kingdom) Peter Stephenson	(Australia) Chris Murphy	12
Ford	Focus RS WRC 04	(Republic of Ireland) MacHale Racing	P	(Republic of Ireland) Gareth MacHale	(Republic of Ireland) Brian Murphy	1
Ford	Focus RS WRC 04	(Republic of Ireland) MacHale Racing	P	(Republic of Ireland) Aaron MacHale	(Republic of Ireland) Killian Duffy	1
Ford	Focus RS WRC 04	(Republic of Ireland) MacHale Racing	P	(Republic of Ireland) Austin MacHale	(Republic of Ireland) Dermot O'Gorman	1
Ford	Focus RS WRC 04	(Finland) Clo Racing		(Finland) Jouni Arolainen	(Finland) Tapio Suominen	2
Ford	Focus RS WRC 04	(Finland) Clo Racing	P	(Finland) Jouni Arolainen	(Finland) Risto Pietiläinen	9
Peugeot	307 WRC	(France) Bozian Racing	P	(France) Dany Snobeck	(France) Gilles Mondesir	11
Škoda	Fabia WRC	(Sweden) P-G Andersson Rallying	P	(Sweden) Per-Gunnar Andersson	(Sweden) Anders Fredriksson	2
Škoda	Fabia WRC	(Norway) Andreas Mikkelsen	P	(Norway) Andreas Mikkelsen	(Norway) Ola Fløene	8
Škoda	Octavia WRC	(Finland) Jukka Ketomäki		(Finland) Jukka Ketomäki	(Finland) Kai Risberg	9
Subaru	Impreza WRC2008	(Norway) Adapta World Rally Team	P	(Norway) Mads Østberg	(Norway) Ole Kristian Unnerud	2, 4, 6–7
Subaru	Impreza WRC2008	(Norway) Adapta World Rally Team	P	(Norway) Mads Østberg	(Norway) Veronica Engan	8
Subaru	Impreza WRC2008	(Norway) Adapta World Rally Team	P	(Norway) Mads Østberg	(Sweden) Jonas Andersson	9, 12
Subaru	Impreza WRC2008	(Norway) Adapta World Rally Team	P	(Norway) Anders Grøndal	(Sweden) Maria Andersson	2
Subaru	Impreza WRC2008	(United Kingdom) Prodrive	P	(Finland) Marcus Grönholm	(Finland) Timo Rautiainen	4
Subaru	Impreza WRC2007	(Republic of Ireland) Eamonn Boland	P	(Republic of Ireland) Eamonn Boland	(Republic of Ireland) Damien Morrissey	1–2
Subaru	Impreza WRC2007	(Republic of Ireland) Tim McNulty		(Republic of Ireland) Tim McNulty	(Republic of Ireland) Eugene O'Donnell	1
Subaru	Impreza WRC2007	(Italy) Fabio Montanari		(Italy) Fabio Montanari	(San Marino) Silvio Stefanelli	6
Subaru	Impreza WRC2007	(Finland) Ketomaa World Rally Team	P	(Finland) Jari Ketomaa	(Finland) Mika Stenberg	9
Subaru	Impreza WRC2007	(United Kingdom) Graham Coffey	P	(United Kingdom) Graham Coffey	(United Kingdom) David Gamblin	11
Subaru	Impreza WRC2004	(Italy) Pier Lorenzo Zanchi	P	(Italy) Pier Lorenzo Zanchi	(Italy) Dario D'Esposito	6

=== Team and Driver changes ===
Subaru pulled out of the WRC at the end of the 2008 season, citing the economic downturn then affecting the automotive industry for their withdrawal, leaving Petter Solberg and Chris Atkinson without a drive. Solberg would set up his own team for the 2009 season, running an eight year old Citroën Xsara WRC for the majority of the season, although the Norwegian did consider switching to a Peugeot 307 WRC for Rally Finland. Chris Atkinson would drive for the Citroën Junior Team in the season opener in Ireland as a one off.

Suzuki pulled out of the WRC at the end of the 2008 season, citing the economic downturn then affecting the automotive industry for their withdrawal, leaving Toni Gardemeister and Per-Gunnar Andersson without a seat. Gardemeister would leave the WRC while Andersson would do a one off round at Rally Norway in a Škoda Fabia WRC.

Stobart VK M-Sport Ford Rally Team retained Henning Solberg and Matthew Wilson for 2009 and had planned to run Urmo Aava in eight rallies but was dropped after two. 2008 drivers François Duval and Gianluigi Galli left the WRC.

Citroën set up the Citroën Junior Team as a manufacturer Team run by PH Sport who had run privateer C4’s the previous year. Their three main drivers were 2008 JWRC champion Sébastien Ogier, Conrad Rautenbach and Evgeny Novikov.

=== J-WRC Entries ===
No	Driver	Co-driver	Car	Rounds
31	(Germany) Aaron Burkart	(Germany) Michael Kölbach	Suzuki Swift S1600	1, 3, 5–6, 9, 11
32	(Poland) Michał Kościuszko	(Poland) Maciek Szczepaniak	Suzuki Swift S1600	3–6, 8–9
33	(Italy) Simone Bertolotti	(Italy) Luca Celestini	Suzuki Swift S1600	1, 4, 6, 8–9, 11
34	(Italy) Luca Griotti	(Italy) Corrado Bonato	Renault Clio R3	1, 4, 6, 8–9, 11
35	(France) Yoann Bonato	(France) Benjamin Boulloud	Suzuki Swift S1600	1, 4, 6, 8–9, 11
36	(Netherlands) Hans Weijs, Jr.	(Belgium) Bjorn Degandt	Citroën C2 S1600	1, 4, 6, 8–9, 11
37	(Netherlands) Kevin Abbring	(Belgium) Erwin Mombaerts	Renault Clio R3	1, 4, 6, 8–9, 11
38	(Czech Republic) Martin Prokop	(Czech Republic) Jan Tománek	Citroën C2 S1600	1, 3, 6, 8–9, 11
39	(Italy) Alessandro Bettega	(Italy) Simone Scattolin	Renault Clio S1600	5
39	(Italy) Alessandro Bettega	(Italy) Simone Scattolin	Renault Clio R3	4, 6, 8
39	(Germany) Mark Wallenwein	(Germany) Stefan Kopczyk	Renault Clio R3	9, 11
Additional guest entries^{†}
60	(Republic of Ireland) Ross Forde	(Republic of Ireland) Arron Forde	Suzuki Swift Sport	1
59	(Poland) Radosław Typa	(Poland) Maciek Wislawski	Citroën C2 R2	8
60	(Poland) Marcin Dobrowolski	(Poland) Michal Dobrowolski	Citroën C2 R2	8
59	(Finland) Kalle Pinomaki	(Finland) Matti Kaskinen	Renault Clio R3	9
59	(Spain) Jordi Martí	(Spain) Gabriel Sánchez	Renault Clio R3	11

=== P-WRC Entries ===
No	Driver	Co-driver	Car	Rounds
31	(Czech Republic) Martin Prokop	(Czech Republic) Jan Tománek	Mitsubishi Lancer Evo IX	2, 4–5, 7, 10, 12
32	(Portugal) Bernardo Sousa	(Portugal) Jorge Carvalho	Fiat Abarth Grande Punto S2000	2–4, 6–7, 10, 12
33	(Japan) Toshihiro Arai	(Australia) Glenn Macneal	Subaru Impreza WRX STI	2–3, 5, 7, 10, 12
34	(Italy) Gianluca Linari	(Italy) Andrea Cecchi	Subaru Impreza WRX STI	2–4, 7, 10
34	(Italy) Gianluca Linari	(Italy) Paolo Gregoriani	Subaru Impreza WRX STI	6
35	(Czech Republic) Martin Semerád	(Czech Republic) Bohuslav Ceplecha	Mitsubishi Lancer Evo IX	2–3
64	(Czech Republic) Martin Semerád	(Czech Republic) Bohuslav Ceplecha	Mitsubishi Lancer Evo X	4, 6–7, 12
36	(Spain) Egoi Eder Valdés López	(Spain) Daniel Lucas	Subaru Impreza WRX STI	3–7, 12
37	(France) Frederic Sauvan	(France) Thibault Gorczyca	Mitsubishi Lancer Evo IX	2–3, 5–6
37	(France) Frederic Sauvan	(France) Sebastien Capanna	Mitsubishi Lancer Evo IX	7, 12
38	(Hungary) Gabor Mayer	(Hungary) Róbert Tagai	Subaru Impreza WRX STI	3–7, 12
39	(Italy) Simone Campedelli	(Italy) Danilo Fappani	Mitsubishi Lancer Evo IX	3, 6
39	(France) Thomas Privé	(France) Patrice Zurro	Mitsubishi Lancer Evo IX	4
39	(Italy) Stefano Marrini	(Italy) Roberto Mometti	Mitsubishi Lancer Evo IX	5
39	(Portugal) Armindo Araujo	(Portugal) Miguel Ramalho	Mitsubishi Lancer Evo IX	10
39	(Norway) Eyvind Brynildsen	(France) Denis Giraudet	Škoda Fabia S2000	12
40	(Latvia) Andis Neikšāns	(Latvia) Pēteris Dzirkals	Mitsubishi Lancer Evo IX	2–4, 6–7
40	(United Kingdom) Dave Weston, Jr.	(United Kingdom) Iuean Thomas	Subaru Impreza WRX STI	12
43	(Argentina) Luciano Bernardi	(Argentina) Fabian Cretu	Mitsubishi Lancer Evo X	5
43	(New Zealand) Mark Tapper	(New Zealand) Jeff Judd	Mitsubishi Lancer Evo IX	10
65	(New Zealand) Mark Tapper	(New Zealand) Jeff Judd	Mitsubishi Lancer Evo X	4, 6–7, 12
44	(Czech Republic) Jaromir Tarabus	(Czech Republic) Daniel Trunkat	Fiat Abarth Grande Punto S2000	2
44	(Czech Republic) Jaromir Tarabus	(Czech Republic) Filip Schovánek	Fiat Abarth Grande Punto S2000	4
44	(Qatar) Nasser Al-Attiyah	(Italy) Giovanni Bernacchini	Subaru Impreza WRX STI	3
44	(Cyprus) Spyros Pavlides	(United Kingdom) Chris Patterson	Subaru Impreza WRX STI	5, 12
44	(Cyprus) Spyros Pavlides	(France) Denis Giraudet	Subaru Impreza WRX STI	7
45	(Sweden) Patrik Flodin	(Sweden) Göran Bergsten	Subaru Impreza WRX STI	2, 4, 6–7, 12
45	(New Zealand) Stewart Taylor	(New Zealand) Warwick Searle	Mitsubishi Lancer Evo IX	10
46	(Sweden) Patrik Sandell	(Sweden) Emil Axelsson	Škoda Fabia S2000	2–4, 6–7, 12
47	(Portugal) Armindo Araujo	(Portugal) Miguel Ramalho	Mitsubishi Lancer Evo IX	2–4, 6–7, 12
48	(India) Gaurav Gill	(United Kingdom) David Senior	Subaru Impreza WRX STI	2–4
48	(Germany) Hermann Gassner, Jr.	(Germany) Katharina Wustenhagen	Mitsubishi Lancer Evo IX	6, 12
48	(Italy) Stefano Marrini	(Italy) Roberto Mometti	Mitsubishi Lancer Evo IX	7
48	(China) Liu Chao Dong	(Australia) Anthony McLoughlin	Mitsubishi Lancer Evo IX	10
49	(Norway) Eyvind Brynildsen	(France) Denis Giraudet	Mitsubishi Lancer Evo IX	2, 4–6, 10
49	(Italy) Giorgio Bacco	(Italy) Nicola Arena	Mitsubishi Lancer Evo IX	12
50	(Qatar) Nasser Al-Attiyah	(Italy) Giovanni Bernacchini	Subaru Impreza WRX STI	4–7, 12
50	(New Zealand) Richard Mason	(New Zealand) Sara Mason	Subaru Impreza WRX STI	10
Additional guest entries^{†}
59	(Norway) Andreas Mikkelsen	(Norway) Ola Fløene	Subaru Impreza WRX STI	2
60	(Norway) Bernt Kollevold	(Norway) Veronica Engan	Mitsubishi Lancer Evo IX	2
159	(Cyprus) Nicos Thomas	(Belgium) Stéphane Prévot	Mitsubishi Lancer Evo IX	3
160	(Cyprus) Charalambos Timotheu	(Cyprus) Savvas Laos	Subaru Impreza WRX STI	3
159	(Portugal) Bruno Magalhães	(Portugal) Carlos Magalhães	Peugeot 207 S2000	4
160	(Portugal) Ricardo Moura	(Portugal) Paulo Fiuza	Mitsubishi Lancer Evo IX	4
159	(Argentina) Gabriel Pozzo	(Argentina) Daniel Stillo	Subaru Impreza WRX STI	5
160	(Argentina) Marcos Ligato	(Argentina) Rubén García	Mitsubishi Lancer Evo X	5
59	(Greece) Lambros Athanassoulas	(Greece) Nikolaos Zakheos	Škoda Fabia S2000	7
59	(Australia) Cody Crocker	(Australia) Ben Atkinson	Subaru Impreza WRX STI	10
60	(Australia) Neal Bates	(Australia) Coral Taylor	Toyota Corolla S2000	10
70	(Finland) Kimi Räikkönen	(Finland) Kaj Lindström	Fiat Abarth Grande Punto S2000	9

† – At each rally, the organiser may nominate two "guest drivers" from their country to score support category points.

== Results and standings ==
=== Results and statistics ===
Colour	Rally Surface
Gold	Gravel
Silver	Tarmac
Blue	Snow/Ice
Bronze	Mixed Surface

Round	Rally name	Podium finishers				Statistics			
Round	Rally name	Rank	Driver	Car	Time	Stages	Length	Starters	Finishers
1	(Republic of Ireland) / (Northern Ireland) Rally Ireland (30 January – 1 February) – Results and report	1	(France) Sébastien Loeb	Citroën C4 WRC	2:48:25.7	(19)^{1a} 17	(349.65 km)^{1b} 310.18 km	36	28
1	(Republic of Ireland) / (Northern Ireland) Rally Ireland (30 January – 1 February) – Results and report	2	(Spain) Daniel Sordo	Citroën C4 WRC	2:49:53.6	(19)^{1a} 17	(349.65 km)^{1b} 310.18 km	36	28
1	(Republic of Ireland) / (Northern Ireland) Rally Ireland (30 January – 1 February) – Results and report	3	(Finland) Mikko Hirvonen	Ford Focus RS WRC 08	2:50:33.5	(19)^{1a} 17	(349.65 km)^{1b} 310.18 km	36	28
2	Rally Norway (12 – 15 February) – Results and report	1	(France) Sébastien Loeb	Citroën C4 WRC	3:28:15.9	23	360.90 km	42	34
2	Rally Norway (12 – 15 February) – Results and report	2	(Finland) Mikko Hirvonen	Ford Focus RS WRC 08	3:28:25.7	23	360.90 km	42	34
2	Rally Norway (12 – 15 February) – Results and report	3	(Finland) Jari-Matti Latvala	Ford Focus RS WRC 08	3:29:37.7	23	360.90 km	42	34
3	Cyprus Rally (13 – 15 March) – Results and report	1	(France) Sébastien Loeb	Citroën C4 WRC	4:50:34.7	14	332.07 km	32	24
3	Cyprus Rally (13 – 15 March) – Results and report	2	(Finland) Mikko Hirvonen	Ford Focus RS WRC 08	4:51:01.9	14	332.07 km	32	24
3	Cyprus Rally (13 – 15 March) – Results and report	3	(Norway) Petter Solberg	Citroën Xsara WRC	4:52:24.1	14	332.07 km	32	24
4	Rally de Portugal (2 – 5 April) – Results and report	1	(France) Sébastien Loeb	Citroën C4 WRC	3:53:13.1	18	361.36 km	70	41
4	Rally de Portugal (2 – 5 April) – Results and report	2	(Finland) Mikko Hirvonen	Ford Focus RS WRC 08	3:53:37.4	18	361.36 km	70	41
4	Rally de Portugal (2 – 5 April) – Results and report	3	(Spain) Daniel Sordo	Citroën C4 WRC	3:54:58.5	18	361.36 km	70	41
5	Rally Argentina (24 – 26 April) – Results and report	1	(France) Sébastien Loeb	Citroën C4 WRC	3:57:40.3	23	331.80 km	51	33
5	Rally Argentina (24 – 26 April) – Results and report	2	(Spain) Daniel Sordo	Citroën C4 WRC	3:58:53.4	23	331.80 km	51	33
5	Rally Argentina (24 – 26 April) – Results and report	3	(Norway) Henning Solberg	Focus RS WRC 08	4:01:44.4	23	331.80 km	51	33
6	(Italy) Rally d'Italia Sardegna (22 – 24 May) – Results and report	1	(Finland) Jari-Matti Latvala	Ford Focus RS WRC 09	4:00:55.7	17	347.12 km	59	37
6	(Italy) Rally d'Italia Sardegna (22 – 24 May) – Results and report	2	(Finland) Mikko Hirvonen	Ford Focus RS WRC 09	4:01:25.1	17	347.12 km	59	37
6	(Italy) Rally d'Italia Sardegna (22 – 24 May) – Results and report	3	(Norway) Petter Solberg	Citroën Xsara WRC	4:02:53.3	17	347.12 km	59	37
7	(Greece) Acropolis Rally (12 – 14 June) – Results and report	1	(Finland) Mikko Hirvonen	Ford Focus RS WRC 09	4:09:42.5	(17)^{2a} 15	(371.02 km)^{2b} 341.01 km	45	32
7	(Greece) Acropolis Rally (12 – 14 June) – Results and report	2	(France) Sébastien Ogier	Citroën C4 WRC	4:10:55.4	(17)^{2a} 15	(371.02 km)^{2b} 341.01 km	45	32
7	(Greece) Acropolis Rally (12 – 14 June) – Results and report	3	(Finland) Jari-Matti Latvala	Ford Focus RS WRC 09	4:11:27.5	(17)^{2a} 15	(371.02 km)^{2b} 341.01 km	45	32
8	Rally Poland (26 – 29 June) – Results and report	1	(Finland) Mikko Hirvonen	Ford Focus RS WRC 09	3:07:27.5	18	352.00 km	48	34
8	Rally Poland (26 – 29 June) – Results and report	2	(Spain) Daniel Sordo	Citroën C4 WRC	3:08:37.8	18	352.00 km	48	34
8	Rally Poland (26 – 29 June) – Results and report	3	(Norway) Henning Solberg	Focus RS WRC 08	3:09:33.2	18	352.00 km	48	34
9	Rally Finland (31 July – 2 August) – Results and report	1	(Finland) Mikko Hirvonen	Ford Focus RS WRC 09	2:50:40.9	23	345.15 km	90	60
9	Rally Finland (31 July – 2 August) – Results and report	2	(France) Sébastien Loeb	Citroën C4 WRC	2:51:06.0	23	345.15 km	90	60
9	Rally Finland (31 July – 2 August) – Results and report	3	(Finland) Jari-Matti Latvala	Ford Focus RS WRC 09	2:51:30.8	23	345.15 km	90	60
10	Rally Australia (4 – 6 September) – Results and report	1	(Finland) Mikko Hirvonen	Ford Focus RS WRC 09	2:53:06.5	(35)^{3a} 33	(344.72 km)^{3b} 322.06 km	40	25
10	Rally Australia (4 – 6 September) – Results and report	2	(France) Sébastien Loeb	Citroën C4 WRC	2:53:54.0	(35)^{3a} 33	(344.72 km)^{3b} 322.06 km	40	25
10	Rally Australia (4 – 6 September) – Results and report	3	(Spain) Daniel Sordo	Citroën C4 WRC	2:54:11.1	(35)^{3a} 33	(344.72 km)^{3b} 322.06 km	40	25
11	(Spain) Rally Catalunya (2 – 4 October) – Results and report	1	(France) Sébastien Loeb	Citroën C4 WRC	3:22:14.7	18	353.62 km	70	52
11	(Spain) Rally Catalunya (2 – 4 October) – Results and report	2	(Spain) Daniel Sordo	Citroën C4 WRC	3:22:26.7	18	353.62 km	70	52
11	(Spain) Rally Catalunya (2 – 4 October) – Results and report	3	(Finland) Mikko Hirvonen	Ford Focus RS WRC 09	3:23:08.8	18	353.62 km	70	52
12	(United Kingdom) Rally of Great Britain (23 – 25 October) – Results and report	1	(France) Sébastien Loeb	Citroën C4 WRC	3:16:25.4	16	348.30 km	62	50
12	(United Kingdom) Rally of Great Britain (23 – 25 October) – Results and report	2	(Finland) Mikko Hirvonen	Ford Focus RS WRC 09	3:17:31.5	16	348.30 km	62	50
12	(United Kingdom) Rally of Great Britain (23 – 25 October) – Results and report	3	(Spain) Daniel Sordo	Citroën C4 WRC	3:17:32.5	16	348.30 km	62	50

Notes:

- ^1 – Stages 7 (Murley) and 8 (Fardross) were cancelled.
- ^2 – Stages 3 (Evangelistria) and 16 (Loutraki 2) were cancelled.
- ^3 – Stages 6 (CTEK East 1) and 11 (CTEK East 2) were cancelled.

=== Drivers' championship ===
Pos.	Driver	IRL (Republic of Ireland)	NOR (Norway)	CYP (Cyprus)	POR (Portugal)	ARG (Argentina)	ITA (Italy)	GRC (Greece)	POL (Poland)	FIN (Finland)	AUS (Australia)	ESP (Spain)	GBR (United Kingdom)	Pts
1	(France) Sébastien Loeb	1	1	1	1	1	4	Ret	7	2	2	1	1	93
2	(Finland) Mikko Hirvonen	3	2	2	2	Ret	2	1	1	1	1	3	2	92
3	(Spain) Daniel Sordo	2	5	4	3	2	22	11	2	4	3	2	3	64
4	(Finland) Jari-Matti Latvala	14	3	12	Ret	6	1	3	Ret	3	4	6	7	41
5	(Norway) Petter Solberg		6	3	4	Ret	3	Ret	4	Ret		4	4	35
6	(Norway) Henning Solberg	4	4	18	5	3	8	14	3	30	7	9	5	33
7	(United Kingdom) Matthew Wilson	7	7	5	Ret	5	6	13	5	8	6	7	6	28
8	(France) Sébastien Ogier	6	10	Ret	17	7	Ret	2	Ret	6	5	5	Ret	24
9	(Argentina) Federico Villagra			7	7	4	Ret	4		11	8	8		16
10	(Zimbabwe) Conrad Rautenbach	18	Ret	6	Ret	Ret	Ret	5	8	Ret	Ret	11	8	9
11	(Norway) Mads Østberg		9		6		7	7	Ret	Ret			Ret	7
12	(United Arab Emirates) Khalid al-Qassimi	8		8	8		15	6		9	19	14	19	6
13	(Russia) Evgeny Novikov		11	Ret	Ret		5	15	9	Ret		Ret	DNS	4
14	(Australia) Chris Atkinson	5												4
15	(Finland) Matti Rantanen									5				4
16	(Poland) Krzysztof Hołowczyc								6					3
17	(Finland) Jari Ketomaa									7				2
18	(Qatar) Nasser Al-Attiyah			11	16	8	9	DSQ					Ret	1
19	(Estonia) Urmo Aava	10	8							29				1
20	(Greece) Lambros Athanassoulas							8				25		1
Pos.	Driver	IRL (Republic of Ireland)	NOR (Norway)	CYP (Cyprus)	POR (Portugal)	ARG (Argentina)	ITA (Italy)	GRC (Greece)	POL (Poland)	FIN (Finland)	AUS (Australia)	ESP (Spain)	GBR (United Kingdom)	Pts

Key
Colour	Result
Gold	Winner
Silver	2nd place
Bronze	3rd place
Green	Points finish
Blue	Non-points finish
Blue	Non-classified finish (NC)
Purple	Did not finish (Ret)
Black	Excluded (EX)
Black	Disqualified (DSQ)
White	Did not start (DNS)
White	Cancelled (C)
Blank	Withdrew entry from the event (WD)

- Sébastien Loeb secured the drivers' championship title in Wales.

=== Manufacturers' championship ===
Pos.	Manufacturer	No.	IRL (Republic of Ireland)	NOR (Norway)	CYP (Cyprus)	POR (Portugal)	ARG (Argentina)	ITA (Italy)	GRE (Greece)	POL (Poland)	FIN (Finland)	AUS (Australia)	ESP (Spain)	GBR (United Kingdom)	Points
1	(France) Citroën Total World Rally Team	1	1	1	1	1	1	3	Ret	5	2	2	1	1	167
1	(France) Citroën Total World Rally Team	2	2	5	3	3	2	7	5	2	4	3	2	3	167
2	(United Kingdom) BP Ford World Rally Team	3	3	2	2	2	Ret	2	1	1	1	1	3	2	140
2	(United Kingdom) BP Ford World Rally Team	4	7	3	7	Ret	6	1	2	Ret	3	4	5	7	140
3	(United Kingdom) Stobart M-Sport Ford Rally Team	5	6	6	4	Ret	5	5	6	4	6	6	6	6	80
3	(United Kingdom) Stobart M-Sport Ford Rally Team	6	4	4	8	4	3	6	7	3	8	7	8	5	80
4	(France) Citroën Junior Team	7	5	7	Ret	Ret		4	8	7	Ret				47
4	(France) Citroën Junior Team	8	8	Ret	5	Ret	Ret	Ret	4	6		Ret	9		47
4	(France) Citroën Junior Team	11												4	47
4	(France) Citroën Junior Team	12					7				5	5	4	Ret	47
5	(Argentina) Munchi's Ford World Rally Team	9			6	5	4	Ret	3		7	8	7		23
Pos.	Manufacturer	No.	IRL (Republic of Ireland)	NOR (Norway)	CYP (Cyprus)	POR (Portugal)	ARG (Argentina)	ITA (Italy)	GRE (Greece)	POL (Poland)	FIN (Finland)	AUS (Australia)	ESP (Spain)	GBR (United Kingdom)	Points

Key
Colour	Result
Gold	Winner
Silver	2nd place
Bronze	3rd place
Green	Points finish
Blue	Non-points finish
Blue	Non-classified finish (NC)
Purple	Did not finish (Ret)
Black	Excluded (EX)
Black	Disqualified (DSQ)
White	Did not start (DNS)
White	Cancelled (C)
Blank	Withdrew entry from the event (WD)

- Citroën secured the manufacturers' championship in Catalunya.

=== JWRC Drivers' championship ===
Pos.	Driver	IRL (Republic of Ireland)	CYP (Cyprus)	POR (Portugal)	ARG (Argentina)	ITA (Italy)	POL (Poland)	FIN (Finland)	ESP (Spain)	Pts
1	(Czech Republic) Martin Prokop	2	1			1	2	1	Ret	46
2	(Poland) Michał Kościuszko		2	1	1	2	Ret	3		42
3	(Germany) Aaron Burkart	1	3		2	3		4	5	39
4	(Netherlands) Kevin Abbring	5		2		Ret	1	Ret	4	27
5	(Netherlands) Hans Weijs, Jr.	Ret		3		6	4	7	1	26
6	(Italy) Simone Bertolotti	3		6		7	5	6	2	26
7	(France) Yoann Bonato	4		Ret		4	3	Ret		16
8	(Italy) Alessandro Bettega			5	3	5				14
9	(Italy) Luca Griotti	6		4		Ret	7	Ret		10
10	(Finland) Kalle Pinomaki							2		8
11	(Spain) Jordi Marti								3	6
12	(Germany) Mark Wallenwein							5	Ret	4
13	(Poland) Radosław Typa						6			3
Pos.	Driver	IRL (Republic of Ireland)	CYP (Cyprus)	POR (Portugal)	ARG (Argentina)	ITA (Italy)	POL (Poland)	FIN (Finland)	ESP (Spain)	Pts

Key
Colour	Result
Gold	Winner
Silver	2nd place
Bronze	3rd place
Green	Points finish
Blue	Non-points finish
Blue	Non-classified finish (NC)
Purple	Did not finish (Ret)
Black	Excluded (EX)
Black	Disqualified (DSQ)
White	Did not start (DNS)
White	Cancelled (C)
Blank	Withdrew entry from the event (WD)

=== PWRC Drivers' championship ===
Pos.	Driver	NOR (Norway)	CYP (Cyprus)	POR (Portugal)	ARG (Argentina)	ITA (Italy)	GRC (Greece)	AUS (Australia)	GBR (United Kingdom)	Pts
1	(Portugal) Armindo Araujo	4	2	1		3	2	4		42
2	(Czech Republic) Martin Prokop	3		2	DSQ		4	1	1	39
3	(Qatar) Nasser Al-Attiyah		3	4	1	1	13		Ret	31
4	(Sweden) Patrik Sandell	1	1	Ret		2	11		7	30
5	(Japan) Toshihiro Arai	Ret	4		3		3	Ret	2	25
6	(Norway) Eyvind Brynildsen	2		3	5	5		Ret	DSQ	22
7	(Sweden) Patrik Flodin	7		Ret		4	7		6	12
8	(Latvia) Andis Neikšāns	5	5	Ret		EX	6			11
9	(Greece) Lambros Athanassoulas						1			10
10	(Portugal) Bernardo Sousa	Ret		Ret			5	Ret	4	9
11	(New Zealand) Mark Tapper			5		Ret	8	Ret	5	9
12	(Argentina) Marcos Ligato				2					8
13	(New Zealand) Richard Mason							2		8
14	(Italy) Gianluca Linari	11	9	6		7	10	6		8
15	(Czech Republic) Martin Semerad	10	Ret	8		Ret	Ret		3	7
16	(Australia) Cody Crocker							3		6
17	(France) Frederic Sauvan	8	7		Ret	6	12		10	6
18	(Cyprus) Spyros Pavlides				4		9			5
19	(Hungary) Gabor Mayer		8	Ret	6	8	Ret		9	5
20	(New Zealand) Stewart Taylor							5		4
21	(Czech Republic) Jaromir Tarabus	6		Ret						3
22	(Cyprus) Charalambos Timotheu		6							3
23	(India) Gaurav Singh Gill		Ret	7						2
24	(Germany) Hermann Gassner Jr.					Ret			8	1
Pos.	Driver	NOR (Norway)	CYP (Cyprus)	POR (Portugal)	ARG (Argentina)	ITA (Italy)	GRC (Greece)	AUS (Australia)	GBR (United Kingdom)	Pts

Key
Colour	Result
Gold	Winner
Silver	2nd place
Bronze	3rd place
Green	Points finish
Blue	Non-points finish
Blue	Non-classified finish (NC)
Purple	Did not finish (Ret)
Black	Excluded (EX)
Black	Disqualified (DSQ)
White	Did not start (DNS)
White	Cancelled (C)
Blank	Withdrew entry from the event (WD)
