= Eyvind Brynildsen =

Norwegian rally driver (born 1988)

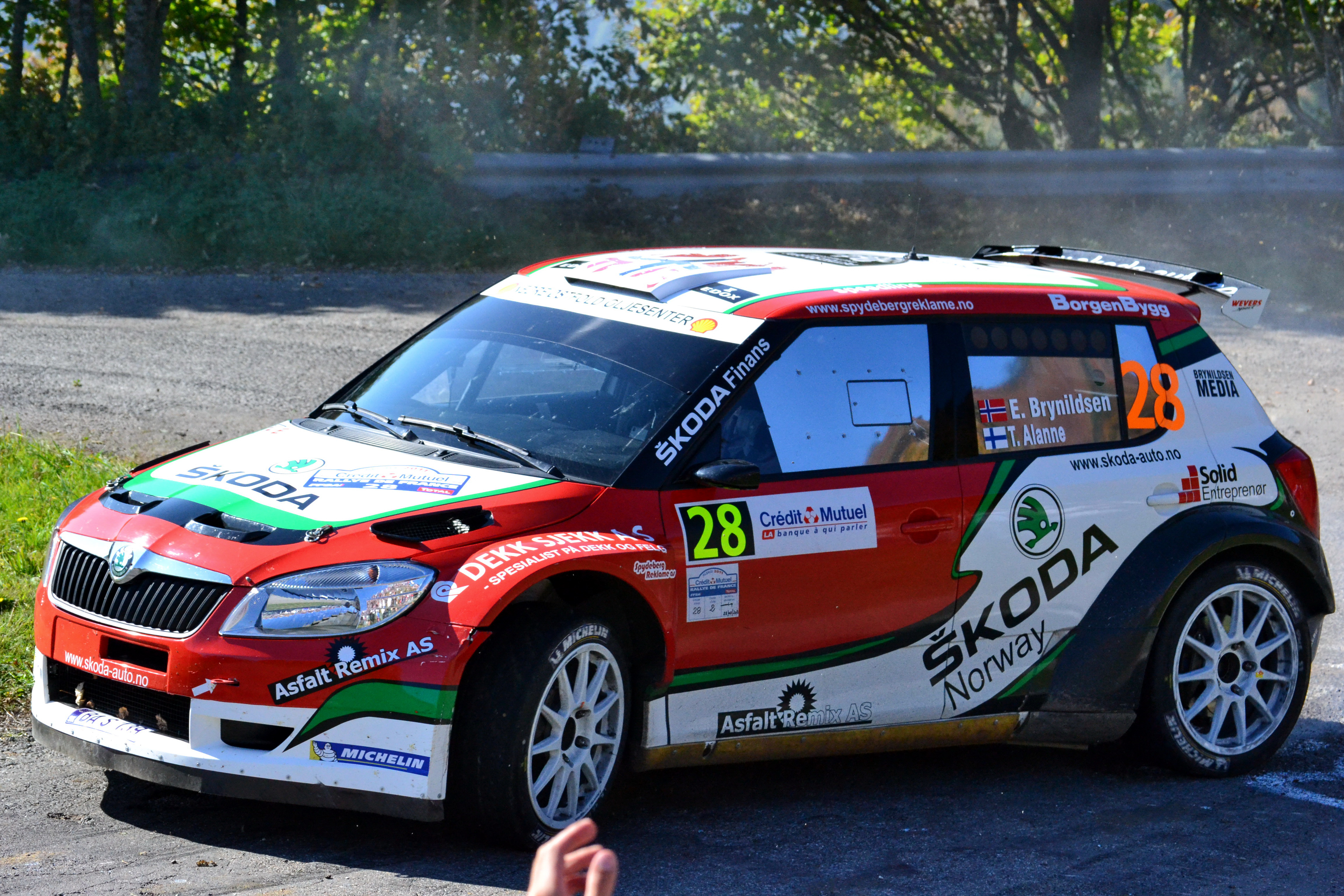
- Brynildsen at the 2011 Rallye de France

Personal information
- Nationality: (Norway) Norwegian
- Born: 14 January 1988 (age 38)

World Rally Championship record
- Years active: 2006–2017, 2019–present
- Co-driver: (Norway) Arne-Olav Rønning (Norway) Veronica Gulbæk Engan (France) Denis Giraudet (Sweden) Maria Andersson (Australia) Glenn Macneall (Norway) Cato Menkerud (Finland) Timo Alanne (Sweden) Anders Fredriksson (Austria) Ilka Minor (Norway) Jørn Listerud
- Rallies: 53
- Championships: 0
- Rally wins: 0
- Podiums: 0
- Stage wins: 0
- Total points: 2
- First rally: 2006 Swedish Rally

Eyvind Brynildsen (born 14 January 1988) is a Norwegian rally driver. During 2011, he competed in the Super 2000 World Rally Championship in a Škoda Fabia S2000. He is currently looking for a drive with the Adapta World Rally Team alongside Mads Østberg, where he drove the second Ford Fiesta RS WRC during the 2012 Rally Sweden.

== Career results ==
=== WRC results ===
Year	Entrant	Car	1	2	3	4	5	6	7	8	9	10	11	12	13	14	15	16	Pos.	Points
2006	Eyvind Brynildsen	Mitsubishi Lancer Evo VII	MON	SWE; 44	MEX	ESP	FRA	ARG	ITA	GRE	GER	FIN	JPN	CYP	TUR	AUS	NZL	GBR	NC	0
2007	Eyvind Brynildsen	Mitsubishi Lancer Evo IX	MON	SWE; 19	NOR; 13	MEX	POR; 46	ARG	ITA	GRE	FIN	GER; 35	NZL	ESP; 24	FRA	JPN	IRE	GBR	NC	0
2008	Eyvind Brynildsen	Mitsubishi Lancer Evo IX	MON	SWE; 37	MEX	ARG	JOR	ITA	GRE; Ret	TUR; Ret	FIN; 49	GER	NZL	ESP; 34	FRA	JPN; 13	GBR; Ret		NC	0
2009	Ralliart New Zealand	Mitsubishi Lancer Evo IX	IRE	NOR; 13	CYP	POR; 18	ARG; 18	ITA; 18	GRE	POL	FIN	AUS; Ret							NC	0
2009	Eyvind Brynildsen	Škoda Fabia S2000											ESP; 13						NC	0
2009	Errani Team Group	Škoda Fabia S2000												GBR; EX					NC	0
2010	René Georges Rallysport	Škoda Fabia S2000	SWE; 16	MEX; 21	JOR; 14	TUR	NZL	POR; 29	BUL; 15	FIN	GER; 14	JPN	FRA; 20	ESP	GBR; Ret				NC	0
2011	Eyvind Brynildsen	Škoda Fabia S2000	SWE; Ret	MEX	POR	JOR; 18	ITA; Ret	ARG	GRE; 18	FIN; Ret	GER	AUS	FRA; 13	ESP	GBR				NC	0
2012	Eyvind Brynildsen	Ford Fiesta RS WRC	MON	SWE; 10	MEX	POR	ARG	GRE	NZL	FIN	GER	GBR	FRA	ITA	ESP				34th	1
2013	DMACK-Autotek	Ford Fiesta RRC	MON	SWE; Ret	MEX	POR	ARG	GRE	ITA										NC	0
2013	DMACK-Autotek	Ford Fiesta R5								FIN; 28	GER; Ret	AUS	FRA	ESP	GBR; 11				NC	0
2014	Eyvind Brynildsen	Ford Fiesta RRC	MON	SWE	MEX	POR	ARG	ITA	POL	FIN; 14	GER	AUS	FRA	ESP	GBR				NC	0
2015	Drive Dmack	Ford Fiesta RRC	MON	SWE; 14	MEX	POR	ARG	ITA	POL	FIN; Ret	GER	AUS	FRA	ESP					NC	0
2015	Motorsport Italia	Škoda Fabia R5													GBR; 39				NC	0
2016	M-Sport	Ford Fiesta R5	MON	SWE; 15	MEX	ARG	POR	ITA	POL	FIN	GER	CHN; C	FRA	ESP	GBR	AUS			NC	0
2017	Adapta Motorsport	Ford Fiesta R5	MON	SWE; 21	MEX	FRA	ARG	POR	ITA	POL	FIN	GER	ESP						NC	0
2017	Eyvind Brynildsen	Ford Fiesta R5												GBR; Ret	AUS				NC	0
2019	Toksport World Rally Team	Škoda Fabia R5	MON	SWE; 16	MEX	FRA	ARG	CHL	POR	ITA	FIN	GER	TUR	GBR	ESP	AUS; C			NC	0
2020	Toksport WRT	Škoda Fabia R5 Evo	MON	SWE	MEX	EST; 16	TUR; 18	ITA; 13	MNZ										NC	0
2021	Toksport WRT	Škoda Fabia R5 Evo	MON	ARC; 15	CRO	POR	ITA	KEN	EST	BEL	GRE	FIN	ESP	MNZ					NC	0
2022	Toksport WRT	Škoda Fabia Rally2 evo	MON	SWE	CRO	POR	ITA	KEN	EST	FIN	BEL	GRE; 10	NZL	ESP	JPN				35th	1
2024	Toksport WRT	Škoda Fabia RS Rally2	MON	SWE	KEN	CRO; 14	POR	ITA	POL	LAT	FIN	GRE	CHL	EUR	JPN				NC	0

==== PWRC results ====
Year	Entrant	Car	1	2	3	4	5	6	7	8	Pos.	Points
2008	Eyvind Brynildsen	Mitsubishi Lancer Evo IX	SWE; 15	ARG	GRE; Ret	TUR; Ret	FIN; 10	NZL	JPN; 4	GBR; Ret	19th	5
2009	Ralliart New Zealand	Mitsubishi Lancer Evo IX	NOR; 2	CYP	POR; 3	ARG; 5	ITA; 5	GRE	AUS; Ret	GBR; EX	6th	22

==== SWRC results ====
Year	Entrant	Car	1	2	3	4	5	6	7	8	9	10	Pos.	Points
2010	René Georges Rallysport	Škoda Fabia S2000	SWE; 5	MEX; 4	JOR; 2	NZL	POR; 9	FIN	GER; 4	JPN	FRA; 5	GBR; Ret	6th	64
2011	PS Engineering	Škoda Fabia S2000	MEX	JOR; 5	ITA; Ret	GRE; 7	FIN; Ret	GER	FRA; 2	ESP			8th	34

==== WRC-2 results ====
Year	Entrant	Car	1	2	3	4	5	6	7	8	9	10	11	12	13	14	Pos.	Points
2013	DMACK-Autotek	Ford Fiesta RRC	MON	SWE; Ret	MEX	POR	ARG	GRE	ITA								26th	13
2013	DMACK-Autotek	Ford Fiesta R5								FIN; 10	GER; Ret	AUS	FRA	ESP	GBR; 4		26th	13
2014	Eyvind Brynildsen	Ford Fiesta RRC	MON	SWE	MEX	POR	ARG	ITA	POL	FIN; 5	GER	AUS	FRA	ESP	GBR		29th	10
2015	Drive Dmack	Ford Fiesta RRC	MON	SWE; 2	MEX	ARG	POR	ITA	POL	FIN; Ret	GER	AUS	FRA	ESP			23rd	18
2015	Motorsport Italia	Škoda Fabia R5													GBR; 14		23rd	18
2016	M-Sport	Ford Fiesta R5	MON	SWE; 5	MEX	ARG	POR	ITA	POL	FIN	GER	CHN; C	FRA	ESP	GBR	AUS	30th	10
2017	Adapta Motorsport	Ford Fiesta R5	MON	SWE; 8	MEX	FRA	ARG	POR	ITA	POL	FIN	GER	ESP				36th	4
2017	Eyvind Brynildsen	Ford Fiesta R5												GBR; Ret	AUS		36th	4
2019	Toksport World Rally Team	Škoda Fabia R5	MON	SWE; 6	MEX	FRA	ARG	CHL	POR	ITA	FIN	GER	TUR	GBR	ESP	AUS; C	33rd	8
2020	Toksport WRT	Škoda Fabia R5 Evo	MON	SWE	MEX	EST; 4	TUR; 3	ITA; 3	MNZ								6th	42
2021	Toksport WRT	Škoda Fabia R5 Evo	MON	ARC; 4	CRO	POR	ITA	KEN	EST	BEL	GRE	FIN	ESP	MNZ			17th	12
2022	Toksport WRT	Škoda Fabia Rally2 evo	MON	SWE	CRO	POR	ITA	KEN	EST	FIN	BEL	GRE; 4	NZL	ESP	JPN		31st	12
2024	Toksport WRT	Škoda Fabia RS Rally2	MON	SWE	KEN	CRO; 5	POR	ITA	POL	LAT	FIN	GRE	CHL	EUR	JPN		26th	10

=== ERC results ===
Year	Entrant	Car	1	2	3	4	5	6	7	8	Pos	Points
2018	Eyvind Brynildsen	Ford Fiesta R5	AZO	CAN; 9	ACR; 4	CYP	RMC	CZE	POL	LIE; Ret	18th	23
2024	Eyvind Brynildsen	Volkswagen Polo GTI R5	HUN	CAN	SWE; Ret	EST	ITA	CZE	GBR	POL	NC	0
2025	Eyvind Brynildsen	Toyota GR Yaris Rally2	ESP	HUN	SWE; 1	POL	ITA	CZE	GBR	CRO	10th*	31*

* Season still in progress.
