= Aaron Burkart =

German rally driver (born 1982)

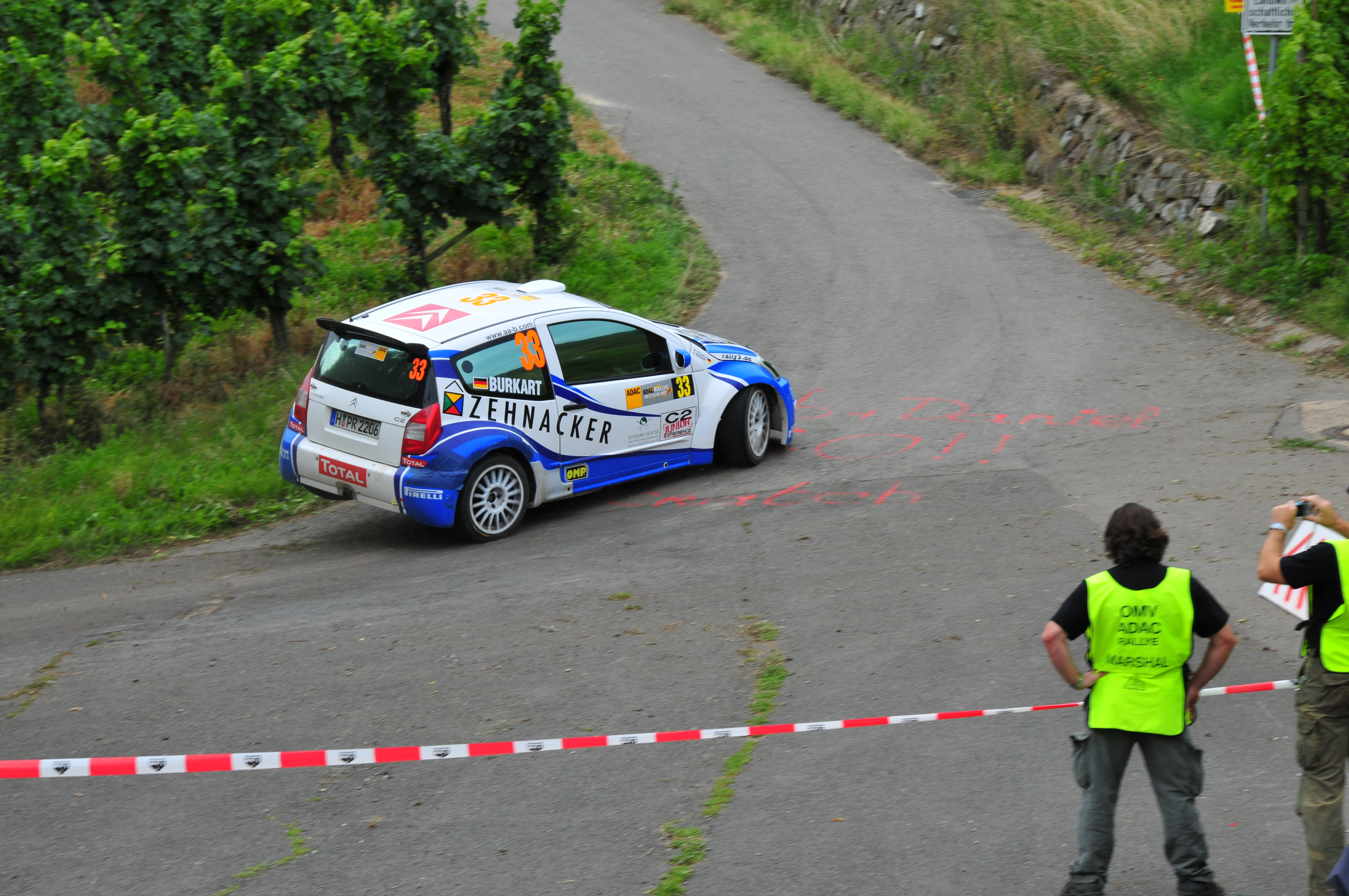
- Burkart at the 2008 Rallye Deutschland

Personal information
- Nationality: (Germany) German
- Full name: Aaron Nikolai Burkart
- Born: September 20, 1982 (age 44); Singen, Baden-Württemberg, West Germany

World Rally Championship record
- Years active: 2003–2011
- Co-driver: (Germany) André Kachel (Germany) Kevin Zemanik (Germany) Jörg Bastuck (Germany) Tanja Geilhausen (Germany) Timo Gottschalk (Germany) Michael Kölbach
- Rallies: 38
- Championships: 0
- Rally wins: 0
- Podiums: 0
- Stage wins: 0
- Total points: 1
- First rally: 2003 Rallye Deutschland
- Last rally: 2011 Rally Catalunya

Aaron Nikolai Burkart (born 20 September 1982) is a German rally driver. He is the 2010 Junior World Rally Champion.

== Career ==
Burkart began rallying in 2002. In 2006, he began competing in the Junior World Rally Championship (JWRC) in a Citroën C2 S1600. In Burkart's first event in the championship the 2006 Rally Catalunya, his co-driver Jörg Bastuck was killed after being hit by the Ford Fiesta of Barry Clark while changing a wheel on Burkart's car. Undeterred by these events, Burkart completed the season with another co-driver. In 2008, Burkart finished second in the JWRC standings behind fellow Citroën driver Sébastien Ogier. Burkart switched to a Suzuki Swift S1600 for the 2009 season, taking his first JWRC victory on Rally Ireland, finishing the season in third position. Burkart made his debut in a World Rally Car on 2009 Rally GB for the Citroën Junior Team, finishing in 12th. On the 2010 Rally of Turkey, Burkart won the JWRC division and also finished in tenth place overall, scoring himself a WRC point. He went on to score two further JWRC podiums and won the Junior World Rally Championship for Suzuki by four points over Citroën driver Hans Weijs, Jr. in a thrilling, down-to-the-wire battle at the final rally in Spain.

== WRC results ==
Year	Entrant	Car	1	2	3	4	5	6	7	8	9	10	11	12	13	14	15	16	WDC	Points
2003	Aaron Burkart	Volkswagen Polo GTI	MON	SWE	TUR	NZL	ARG	GRE	CYP	GER; Ret	FIN	AUS	ITA	FRA	ESP	GBR			NC	0
2004	Aaron Burkart	Peugeot 106 S16	MON	MEX	NZL	CYP	GRE	TUR	ARG	FIN	GER; Ret	JPN	GBR	ITA	FRA	ESP	AUS		NC	0
2005	Aaron Burkart	Citroën Saxo S1600	MON	SWE	MEX	NZL	ITA; 37	CYP	TUR	GRE	ARG	FIN	GER; Ret	GBR	JPN	FRA	ESP	AUS	NC	0
2006	Aaron Burkart	Citroën Saxo S1600	MON; Ret																NC	0
2006	Aaron Burkart	Citroën C2 S1600		SWE	MEX	ESP; Ret	FRA; 28	ARG	ITA; 23	GRE	GER; 23	FIN	JPN		TUR; 31	AUS	NZL	GBR; 24	NC	0
2006	Aaron Burkart	Mitsubishi Lancer Evolution VIII												CYP; Ret					NC	0
2007	Aaron Burkart	Citroën C2 S1600	MON	SWE	NOR; 38	MEX	POR	ARG	ITA; 18	GRE	FIN; 57	GER; 20	NZL	ESP; 30	FRA; 25	JPN	IRE	GBR	NC	0
2008	Aaron Burkart	Citroën C2 S1600	MON	SWE	MEX; 12	ARG	JOR	ITA; 19	GRE	TUR	FIN; 28	GER; 22	NZL	ESP; 20	FRA; 26	JPN	GBR		NC	0
2009	Aaron Burkart	Suzuki Swift S1600	IRE; 16	NOR	CYP; 20	POR	ARG; 15	ITA; 17	GRE	POL	FIN; 19	AUS	ESP; 37						NC	0
2009	Citroën Junior Team	Citroën C4 WRC												GBR; 12					NC	0
2010	Aaron Burkart	Suzuki Swift S1600	SWE	MEX	JOR	TUR; 10	NZL	POR; 32	BUL	FIN	GER; 26	JPN	FRA; 36	ESP; 26	GBR				26th	1
2011	M-Sport Stobart Ford World Rally Team	Ford Fiesta RS WRC	SWE	MEX	POR	JOR	ITA	ARG	GRE	FIN	GER; 23	AUS	FRA						NC	0
2011	Aaron Burkart	Ford Fiesta S2000												ESP; 19	GBR				NC	0

=== JWRC results ===
Year	Entrant	Car	1	2	3	4	5	6	7	8	9	Pos.	Points
2006	Aaron Burkart	Citroën C2 S1600	SWE	ESP; Ret	FRA; 7	ARG	ITA; 5	GER; 6	FIN	TUR; 12	GBR; 3	12th	15
2007	Aaron Burkart	Citroën C2 S1600	NOR; 5	POR	ITA; 4	FIN; 14	GER; 4	ESP; 7	FRA; 7			7th	18
2008	Aaron Burkart	Citroën C2 S1600	MEX; 4	JOR	ITA; 3	FIN; 4	GER; 2	ESP; 3	FRA; 5			2nd	34
2009	Aaron Burkart	Suzuki Swift S1600	IRE; 1	CYP; 3	POR	ARG; 2	ITA; 3	POL	FIN; 4	ESP; 5		3rd	39
2010	Aaron Burkart	Suzuki Swift S1600	TUR; 1	POR; 3	BUL	GER; 2	FRA; 5	ESP; 4				1st	80

=== PWRC results ===
Year	Entrant	Car	1	2	3	4	5	6	7	8	Pos.	Points
2006	Aaron Burkart	Mitsubishi Lancer Evo VIII	MON	MEX	ARG	GRE	JPN	CYP; Ret	AUS	NZL	NC	0

Sporting positions
Preceded by Martin Prokop	Junior World Rally Champion; 2010	Succeeded by Incumbent
