= Citroën Junior Team =

2009–2012 World Rally Championship manufacturer team

- Full name: Citroën Junior Team
- Base: Versailles, France
- Team principal(s): Benoit Nogier
- Chassis: Citroën DS3 WRC
- Tyres: Michelin

World Rally Championship history
- Debut: 2009 Rally Ireland
- Last event: 2012 Rally Catalunya
- Manufacturers' Championships: 0
- Drivers' Championships: 0
- Rally wins: 3

The Citroën Junior Team was a World Rally Championship team that competed in the 2009, 2010 and 2012 seasons. It was established as a second team for the Citroën brand and was presented as a vehicle to develop young talent.

The team was also the flagship WRC team for Citroën Racing's customer racing department, Citroën Racing Technologies (CRT), which was in existence between 2007 and 2012. As with all of CRT's customer privateers and team, the Citroën Junior Team was run on events by third-party preparation firm PH Sport.

== History ==
=== Background ===
PH Sport and Citroën Sport Technologies (Note: Citroën Racing Technologies from 2009) ran semi-privateer Citroën C4 WRCs for Conrad Rautenbach and Urmo Aava during the 2008 World Rally Championship season.

=== 2009 ===
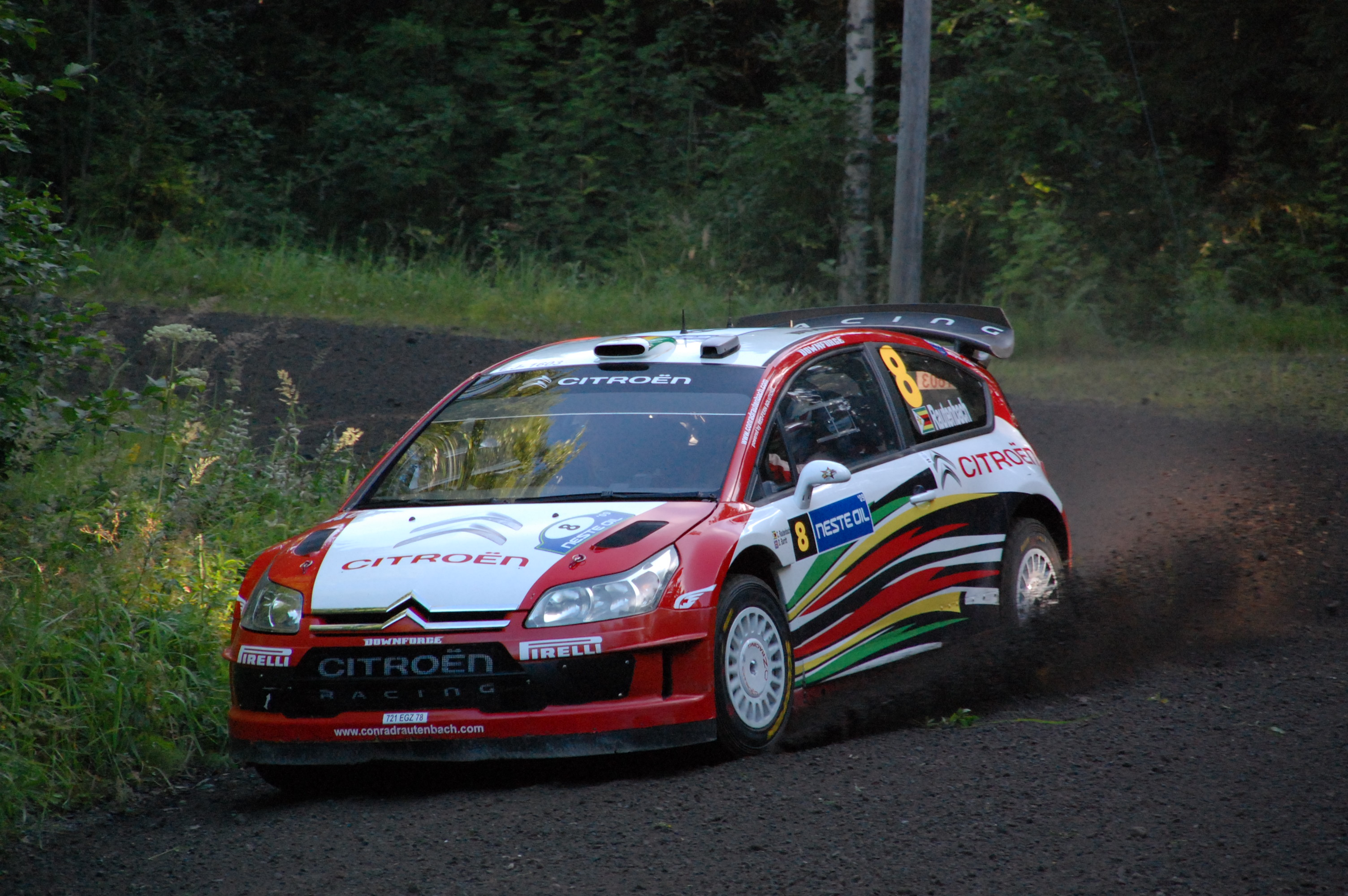
Conrad Rautenbach driving Citroën C4 WRC at the 2009 Rally Finland.

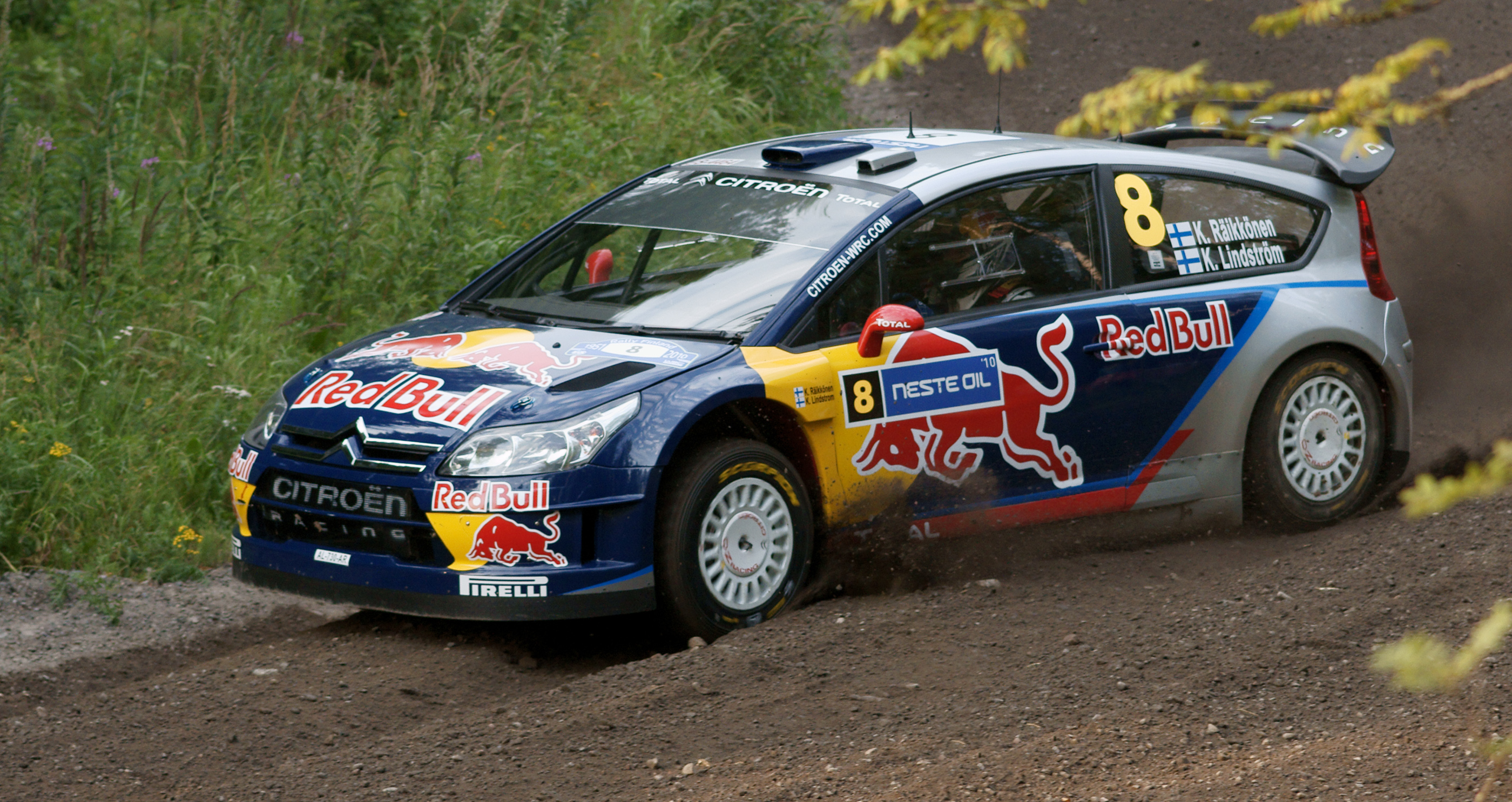
Kimi Räikkönen at the 2010 Rally Finland.

The Citroën Junior Team was formed in 2009 following the withdrawal of manufacturers Subaru and Suzuki. It ran Citroën C4s for Russian Evgeny Novikov, Zimbabwean Conrad Rautenbach and Junior World Rally Championship champion Sébastien Ogier. It ran former Subaru driver Chris Atkinson rather than Novikov on the season-opening Rally Ireland, although despite a good performance, the Australian did not feature in the team again. Petter Solberg was nominated to score manufacturer points for the team at Rally GB. Solberg finished fourth there, with another driver of Citroën Junior Team Aaron Burkart finishing 12th in his first WRC rally with WRC car.

=== 2010 ===
On 4 December 2009, it was announced that 2007 Formula One World Champion Kimi Räikkönen would drive for the Junior Team for his switch to rallying. Räikkönen's co-driver would be Kaj Lindström who had partnered multiple world champion Tommi Mäkinen in the past, while Sébastien Ogier and co-driver Julien Ingrassia were in a second car for the Junior Team.

Räikkönen and Lindström contested 12 out of the 13 rounds in the 2010 WRC season, missing only the Rally of New Zealand. They did not start at 2010 Rally Catalunya because of a crash at the pre-event shakedown.

Sébastien Ogier claimed Citroën Junior Team's best result, winning at 2010 Rally de Portugal. Because of his strong finishes he was promoted to Citroën World Rally Team for gravel rallies (Finland, Japan, Wales) while Dani Sordo switched to Citroën Junior Team for those rallies. The best result for Kimi Räikkönen was 5th place at 2010 Rally of Turkey.

=== 2011 ===
The 'Junior Team' banner was dropped for 2011 as Ogier was promoted to the Citroën World Rally Team. A change in WRC regulations allowed customers of Citroën Racing Technologies to each enter in their own teams with just one car. Petter Solberg, Peter van Merksteijn Jr. and Kimi Räikkönen entered this way in 2011, still using cars from CRT and operated on event by PH Sport.

=== 2012 ===
The Junior Team name was revived as Thierry Neuville entered the WRC in a one-car team after a successful two-year campaign in IRC with Peugeot 207 S2000 run by Peugeot BelLux. His best result was fourth at the Rally de France Alsace and he finished the season in seventh position.

=== 2013– ===
The Citroën Racing Technologies name disappeared after 2012 as Citroën Racing's customer offerings focused on its new DS3 Regional Rally Car, R5, R3T and R1 cars rather than World Rally Cars. No privateer teams contested the WRC manufacturers' championship again in Citroën World Rally Cars, perhaps arguably with the exception of the Abu Dhabi Total World Rally Team in 2016, which was the existing Citroën World Rally Team without an official manufacturer entry, entered again through PH Sport.

=== WRC Results ===
Year	Entrant	Car	No	Driver	1	2	3	4	5	6	7	8	9	10	11	12	13	14	15	WDC	Points	TC	Points
2008	World Rally Team Estonia	Citroën C4 WRC	15	(Estonia) Urmo Aava	MON	SWE; 18	MEX	ARG	JOR; Ret	ITA; 8	GRE; 4	TUR; Ret	FIN; 15	GER; 8	NZL; 5	ESP; Ret	FRA; 7	JPN	GBR	11th	13	–	–
2008	Conrad Rautenbach	Citroën Xsara WRC	21	(Zimbabwe) Conrad Rautenbach	MON; Ret	SWE; 16														15th	6	–	–
2008	Conrad Rautenbach	Citroën C4 WRC	16	(Zimbabwe) Conrad Rautenbach			MEX; 15	ARG; 4	JOR; 26	ITA; 13	GRE; 10	TUR; 8	FIN; 10	GER; 13	NZL; Ret	ESP; Ret	FRA; 14	JPN; Ret	GBR; 15	15th	6	–	–
2008	Equipe de France FFSA	Citroën C4 WRC	17	(France) Sébastien Ogier	MON	SWE	MEX	ARG	JOR	ITA	GRE	TUR	FIN	GER	NZL	ESP	FRA	JPN	GBR; 26	19th	1	–	–
2009	Citroën Junior Team	Citroën C4 WRC	7	(Australia) Chris Atkinson	IRE; 5	NOR	CYP	POR	ARG	ITA	GRE	POL	FIN	AUS	ESP	GBR				14th	4	4th	47
2009	Citroën Junior Team	Citroën C4 WRC	7	(Russia) Evgeny Novikov	IRE	NOR; 11	CYP; Ret	POR; Ret	ARG	ITA; 5	GRC; 16	POL; 9	FIN; Ret	AUS	ESP; Ret	GBR				13th	4	4th	47
2009	Citroën Junior Team	Citroën C4 WRC	8	(Zimbabwe) Conrad Rautenbach	IRE; 18	NOR; Ret	CYP; 6	POR; Ret	ARG; Ret	ITA; 9	GRE; 5	POL; 8	FIN; Ret	AUS; Ret	ESP; 11	GBR; 8				10th	9	4th	47
2009	Citroën Junior Team	Citroën C4 WRC	11	(Norway) Petter Solberg	IRE	NOR	CYP	POR	ARG	ITA	GRE	POL	FIN	AUS	ESP	GBR; 4				5th	35	4th	47
2009	Citroën Junior Team	Citroën C4 WRC	12	(France) Sébastien Ogier	IRE; 6	NOR; 10	CYP; Ret	POR; 17	ARG; 7	ITA; Ret	GRE; 2	POL; Ret	FIN; 6	AUS; 5	ESP; 5	GBR; Ret				8th	24	4th	47
2009	Citroën Junior Team	Citroën C4 WRC	16	(Germany) Aaron Burkart	IRE	NOR	CYP	POR	ARG	ITA	GRE	POL	FIN	AUS	ESP	GBR; 12				–	0	4th	47
2010	Citroën Junior Team	Citroën C4 WRC	7	(France) Sébastien Ogier	SWE; 5	MEX; 3	JOR; 6	TUR; 4	NZL; 2	POR; 1	BUL; 4		GER; 3		FRA; 6	ESP; 10				4th	167	3rd	217
2010	Citroën Junior Team	Citroën C4 WRC	7	(Spain) Dani Sordo								FIN; 5		JPN; 4			GBR; 5			5th	150	3rd	217
2010	Citroën Junior Team	Citroën C4 WRC	8	(Finland) Kimi Räikkönen	SWE; 29	MEX; Ret	JOR; 8	TUR; 5	NZL	POR; 10	BUL; 11	FIN; 25	GER; 7	JPN; Ret	FRA; Ret	ESP; DNS	GBR; 8			10th	25	3rd	217
2012	Citroën Junior Team	Citroën DS3 WRC	23	(Belgium) Thierry Neuville	MON; Ret	SWE; 12	MEX; 13	POR; 8	ARG; 5	GRE; 6	NZL	FIN; 16	GER; 12	GBR; 7	FRA; 4	ITA	ESP; 12			7th	53	5th	72

== Gallery ==
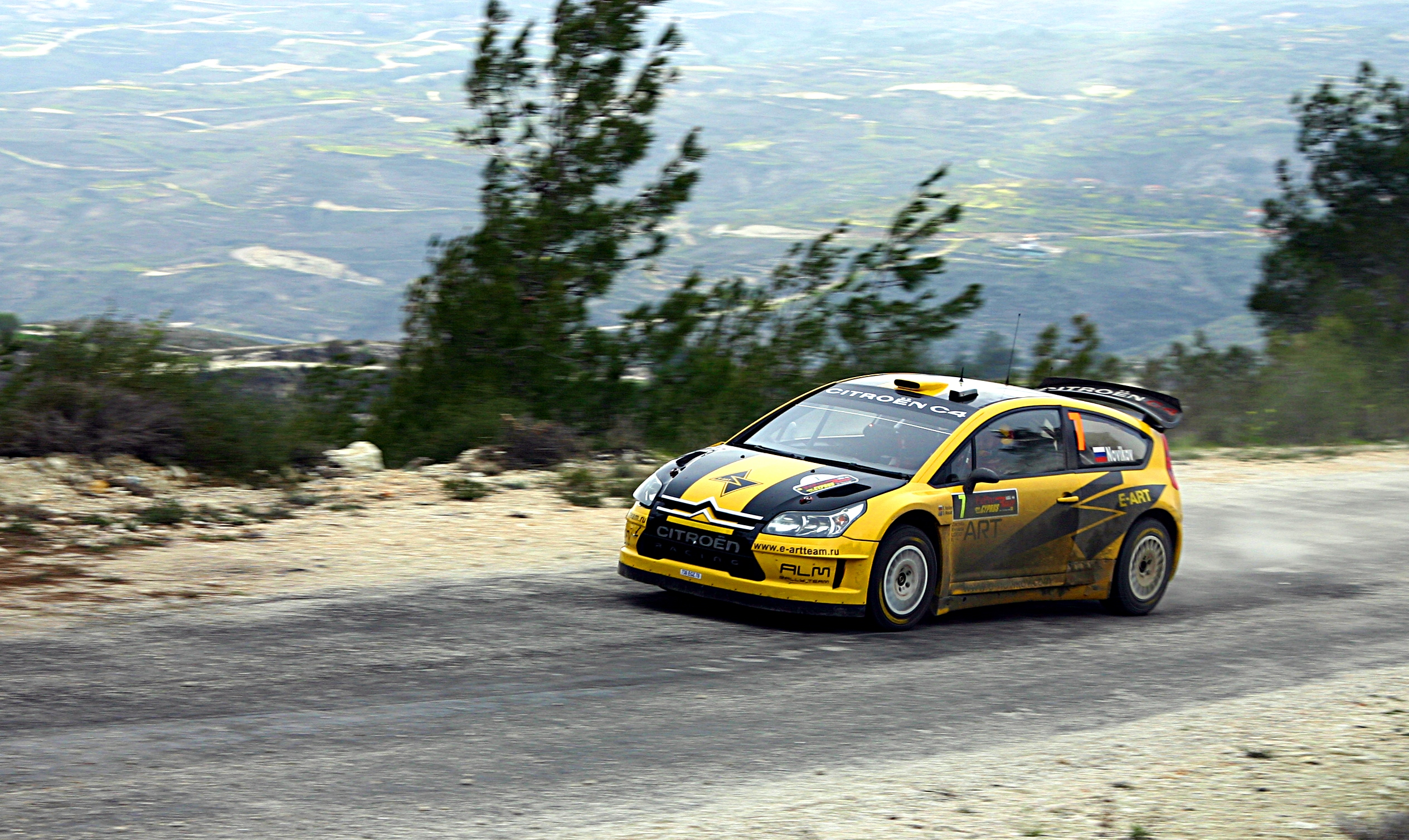
Evgeny Novikov driving a Citroën Junior Team-run Citroën C4 WRC at the 2009 Cyprus Rally

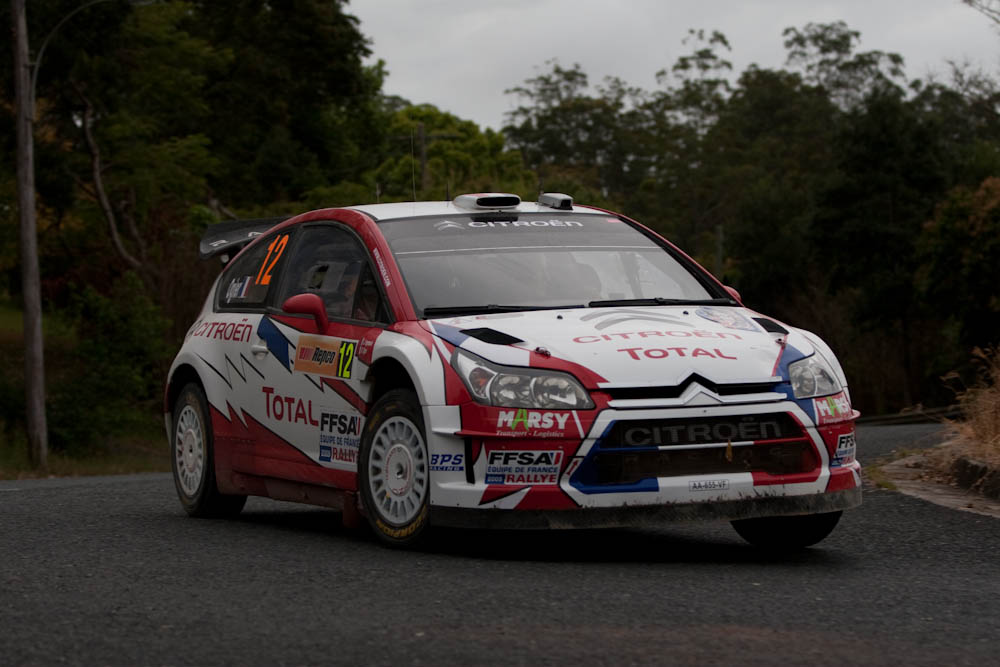
Sébastien Ogier at the 2009 Rally Australia

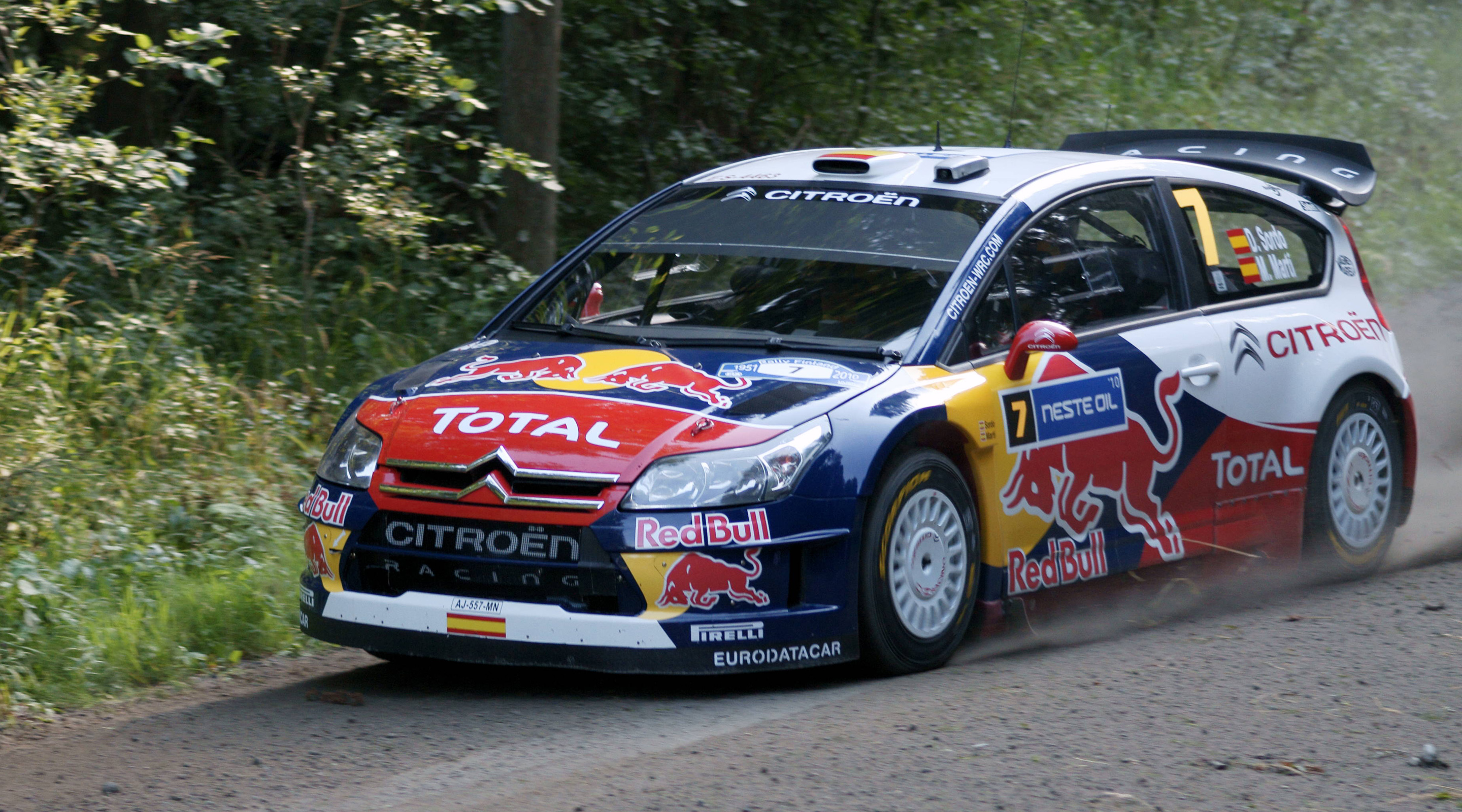
Dani Sordo during his first rally for Citroën Junior Team at 2010 Rally Finland.

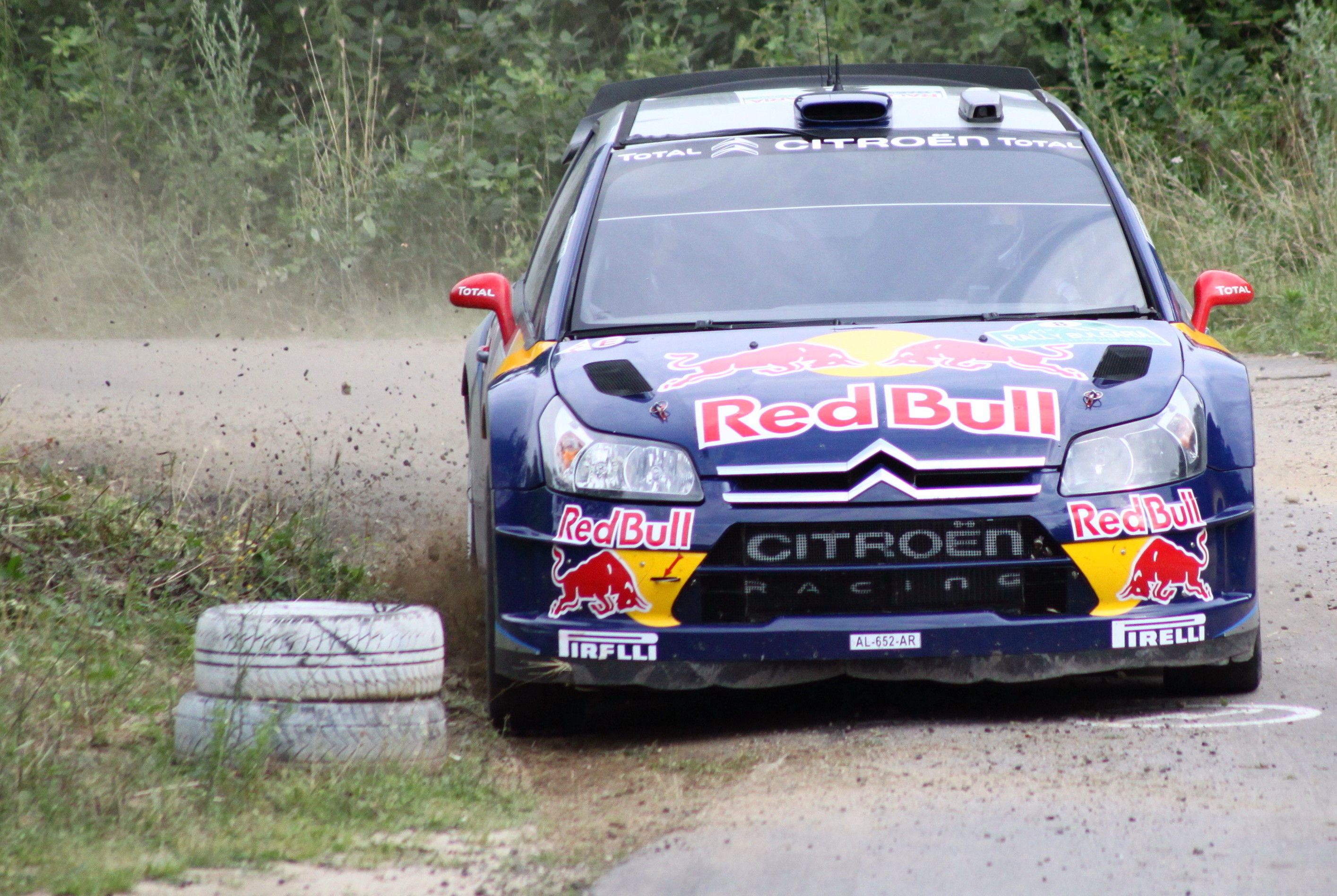
Kimi Räikkönen at the 2010 Rally Bulgaria

== See also ==
- Citroën Racing
- Citroën World Rally Team
- Qatar World Rally Team
- ICE 1 Racing
- Petter Solberg World Rally Team
- Van Merksteijn Motorsport
- PH Sport
