= 2009 Rally d'Italia Sardegna =

2009 Rally d'Italia Sardegna 6º Rally d'Italia Sardegna
Round 6 of the 2009 World Rally Championship
← Previous event	Next event →
- Host country: Italy
- Dates run: May 22 – 24, 2009
- Stages: 17
- Stage surface: Gravel with some Tarmac

Statistics
- Crews: 59 at start, 39 at finish

Overall results
- Overall winner: (Finland) Jari-Matti Latvala (United Kingdom) BP Ford Abu Dhabi WRT

The 2009 Rally d'Italia Sardegna was the sixth running of the Rally d'Italia Sardegna and the sixth round of the 2009 World Rally Championship season. The rally consisted of 17 special stages.

This year's Rally d'Italia Sardegna has new reforms of this rally, with new stages at the first day & the last day, mostly these new stages are gravel with some section of tarmac that make it difficult for drivers especially the grip of the tyres.

Finns Jari-Matti Latvala and Mikko Hirvonen took a double win for the Ford factory team. Latvala's win was his career second, after becoming the youngest-ever driver to win a world rally at the 2008 Swedish Rally. Norwegian privateer Petter Solberg took the final podium spot.

== Summary ==
Several front-runners ran into problems on stage eleven. Citroën's defending world champion Sébastien Loeb lost over a minute and dropped from third to fourth due to a puncture. His fifth-placed teammate Dani Sordo lost even more time and positions with a turbo problem. Eighth-placed Stobart driver Henning Solberg's day ended after he went off the road and broke his Ford Focus WRC's right-hand front suspension, and Citroën Junior Team's Conrad Rautenbach retired after the stage from tenth place with a damper failure. The rally leader Jari-Matti Latvala of Ford also spun during the stage, but escaped without damage.

Latvala led the event from start to finish, taking Ford's first win since the one-two at the 2008 Rally Japan. His teammate Mikko Hirvonen was less than ten seconds behind after two days and supposed to benefit from running behind Latvala on the road, but dust clouds and the resulting hampered visibility suddenly forced him to settle for second. Ford boss Malcolm Wilson decided against applying team orders. Loeb, whose record-equaling six win streak came to an end, took the third place back by passing Petter Solberg, but was later given a two-minute penalty for a safety rule violation; co-driver Daniel Elena unfastened his safety belts before the crew stopped the car for a tire change (after the puncture on SS11). Loeb escaped a disqualification as the stewards considered the infringement less severe because it had happened while they were not driving at a competitive pace.

Citroën Junior Team's 18-year-old Evgeny Novikov finished fifth, taking his career first points-finish. Stobart's Matthew Wilson took sixth place despite hydraulic problems that slowed him down on day one. After Khalid al-Qassimi had run into several problems while heading for career-best seventh place, the battle for the position was between two Norwegians who had had troublesome rallies, both losing about ten minutes and re-joining the event under SupeRally rules. Henning Solberg chased down Mads Østberg throughout the last day but only got within 0.6 seconds. Nasser Al-Attiyah edged out Patrik Sandell on the last stage to take the honours in the Production World Rally Championship, while the win in the Junior World Rally Championship went to Martin Prokop.

== Results ==
Pos.	Driver	Co-driver	Car	Time	Difference	Points
WRC
1	(Finland) Jari-Matti Latvala	(Finland) Miikka Anttila	Ford Focus RS WRC 09	4:00:55.7	0.0	10
2	(Finland) Mikko Hirvonen	(Finland) Jarmo Lehtinen	Ford Focus RS WRC 09	4:01:25.1	29.4	8
3	(Norway) Petter Solberg	(United Kingdom) Phil Mills	Citroën Xsara WRC	4:02:53.3	1:57.6	6
4	(France) Sébastien Loeb	(Monaco) Daniel Elena	Citroën C4 WRC	4:04:39.4	3:43.7	5
5	(Russia) Evgeny Novikov	(Australia) Dale Moscatt	Citroën C4 WRC	4:06:07.5	5:11.8	4
6	(United Kingdom) Matthew Wilson	(United Kingdom) Scott Martin	Ford Focus RS WRC 08	4:08:25.0	7:29.3	3
7	(Norway) Mads Östberg	(Norway) Veronica Engan	Subaru Impreza WRC	4:14:16.3	13:20.6	2
8	(Norway) Henning Solberg	(Norway) Cato Menkerud	Ford Focus RS WRC 08	4:14:16.9	13:21.2	1
JWRC
1	(Czech Republic) Martin Prokop	(Czech Republic) Jan Tománek	Citroën C2 S1600	4:23:40.6	0.0	10
2	(Poland) Michal Kosciuszko	(Poland) Maciek Szczepaniak	Suzuki Swift S1600	4:23:53.8	13.2	8
3	(Germany) Aaron Nikolai Burkart	(Germany) Michael Kölbach	Suzuki Swift S1600	4:31:55.4	8:14.8	6
4	(France) Yoann Bonato	(France) Benjamin Boulloud	Suzuki Swift S1600	4:34:45.2	11:04.5	5
5	(Italy) Alessandro Bettega	(Italy) Simone Scattolin	Renault Clio R3	4:35:40.2	11:59.5	4
6	(Netherlands) Hans Weijs	(Belgium) Bjorn Degandt	Citroën C2 S1600	4:37:14.2	13:33.5	3
7	(Italy) Simone Bertolotti	(Italy) Luca Celestini	Suzuki Swift S1600	5:13:03.0	49:22.4	2
PWRC
1	(Qatar) Nasser Al-Attiyah	(Italy) Giovanni Bernacchini	Subaru Impreza N14	4:20:39.4	0.0	10
2	(Sweden) Patrik Sandell	(Sweden) Emil Axelsson	Škoda Fabia S2000	4:20:40.9	1.5	8
3	(Portugal) Armindo Araujo	(Portugal) Ramalho Miguel	Mitsubishi Lancer Evolution IX	4:24:23.5	3:44.1	6
4	(Sweden) Patrick Flodin	(Sweden) Göran Bergsten	Subaru Impreza	4:27:14.9	6:35.5	5
5	(Norway) Eyvind Brynildsen	(France) Denis Giraudet	Mitsubishi Lancer Evolution IX	4:34:37.9	13:58.5	4
6	(France) Frederic Sauvan	(France) Sebastien Capanna	Mitsubishi Lancer Evolution IX	4:47:14.5	26:35.1	3
7	(Italy) Gianluca Linari	(Italy) Paolo Gregoriani	Subaru Impreza WRX STi	4:48:10.7	27:31.3	2
8	(Hungary) Gabor Mayer	(Hungary) Robert Tagai	Subaru Impreza	4:48:11.3	27:31.9	1

== Special stages ==
Day	Stage	Time (CEST)	Name	Length	Winner	Time	Rally leader
1 (22 May)	SS1	9:32	Sa Conchedda 1	14.99 km	(Finland) Jari-Matti Latvala	10:33.3	(Finland) Jari-Matti Latvala
1 (22 May)	SS2	10:08	Loelle 1	22.3 km	(Spain) Dani Sordo	13:41.6	(Finland) Jari-Matti Latvala
1 (22 May)	SS3	10:43	Crastazza 1	27.81 km	(Finland) Jari-Matti Latvala	18:24.8	(Finland) Jari-Matti Latvala
1 (22 May)	SS4	14:57	Sa Conchedda 2	14.99 km	(Finland) Jari-Matti Latvala	10:16.3	(Finland) Jari-Matti Latvala
1 (22 May)	SS5	15:33	Loelle 2	22.3 km	(France) Sébastien Loeb	13:19.8	(Finland) Jari-Matti Latvala
1 (22 May)	SS6	16:08	Crastazza 2	27.81 km	(Finland) Jari-Matti Latvala	17:57.0	(Finland) Jari-Matti Latvala
2 (23 May)	SS7	8:45	Sa Linea 1	14.2 km	(Finland) Mikko Hirvonen	9:10.5	(Finland) Jari-Matti Latvala
2 (23 May)	SS8	9:31	Fiorentini 1	22.02 km	(France) Sébastien Loeb	18:06.4	(Finland) Jari-Matti Latvala
2 (23 May)	SS9	10:32	Monte Lerno 1	29.15 km	(France) Sébastien Loeb	19:36.7	(Finland) Jari-Matti Latvala
2 (23 May)	SS10	15:05	Sa Linea 2	14.2 km	(Finland) Mikko Hirvonen	9:05.4	(Finland) Jari-Matti Latvala
2 (23 May)	SS11	15:51	Fiorentini 2	22.02 km	(Norway) Petter Solberg	17:53.3	(Finland) Jari-Matti Latvala
2 (23 May)	SS12	16:52	Monte Lerno 2	29.15 km	(France) Sébastien Loeb	18:58.6	(Finland) Jari-Matti Latvala
3 (24 May)	SS13	7:08	Monte Olia 1	19.31 km	(Finland) Jari-Matti Latvala	14:24.3	(Finland) Jari-Matti Latvala
3 (24 May)	SS14	7:42	Sorillis 1	18.66 km	(Finland) Jari-Matti Latvala	14:21.1	(Finland) Jari-Matti Latvala
3 (24 May)	SS15	10:19	Arzachena	10.24 km	(Norway) Henning Solberg	5:46.7	(Finland) Jari-Matti Latvala
3 (24 May)	SS16	11:46	Monte Olia 2	19.31 km	(Norway) Henning Solberg	14:02.6	(Finland) Jari-Matti Latvala
3 (24 May)	SS17	12:20	Sorillis 2	18.66 km	(France) Sébastien Loeb	13:48.3	(Finland) Jari-Matti Latvala

== Championship standings after the event ==
=== Drivers' championship ===
Pos	Driver	IRL (Republic of Ireland)	NOR (Norway)	CYP (Cyprus)	POR (Portugal)	ARG (Argentina)	ITA (Italy)	GRC (Greece)	POL (Poland)	FIN (Finland)	AUS (Australia)	ESP (Spain)	GBR (United Kingdom)	Pts
1	(France) Sébastien Loeb	1	1	1	1	1	4							55
2	(Finland) Mikko Hirvonen	3	2	2	2	Ret	2							38
3	(Spain) Dani Sordo	2	5	4	3	2	23							31
4	(Norway) Henning Solberg	4	4	18	5	3	8							21
5	(Norway) Petter Solberg		6	3	4	Ret	3							20
6	(Finland) Jari-Matti Latvala	14	3	12	Ret	6	1							19
7	(United Kingdom) Matthew Wilson	7	7	5	Ret	5	6							15
8	(Argentina) Federico Villagra			7	7	4	Ret							9
9	(Norway) Mads Østberg		9		6		7							5
9	(France) Sébastien Ogier	6	10	Ret	17	7	Ret							5
11	(Russia) Evgeny Novikov		12	Ret	Ret		5							4
11	(Australia) Chris Atkinson	5												4
13	(Zimbabwe) Conrad Rautenbach	18	Ret	6	Ret	Ret	9							3
13	(United Arab Emirates) Khalid al-Qassimi	8		8	8		16							3
15	(Qatar) Nasser Al-Attiyah			11	16	8	10							1
15	(Estonia) Urmo Aava	10	8											1
Pos	Driver	IRL (Republic of Ireland)	NOR (Norway)	CYP (Cyprus)	POR (Portugal)	ARG (Argentina)	ITA (Italy)	GRC (Greece)	POL (Poland)	FIN (Finland)	AUS (Australia)	ESP (Spain)	GBR (United Kingdom)	Pts

Key
Colour	Result
Gold	Winner
Silver	2nd place
Bronze	3rd place
Green	Points finish
Blue	Non-points finish
Blue	Non-classified finish (NC)
Purple	Did not finish (Ret)
Black	Excluded (EX)
Black	Disqualified (DSQ)
White	Did not start (DNS)
White	Cancelled (C)
Blank	Withdrew entry from the event (WD)

=== Manufacturers' championship ===
Pos	Driver	Event												Total points
Pos	Driver	IRL (Republic of Ireland)	NOR (Norway)	CYP (Cyprus)	POR (Portugal)	ARG (Argentina)	ITA (Italy)	GRC (Greece)	POL (Poland)	FIN (Finland)	AUS (Australia)	ESP (Spain)	GBR (United Kingdom)	Total points
1	(France) Citroën Total World Rally Team	18	14	16	16	18	8	-	-	-	-	-	-	90
2	(United States) BP Ford World Rally Team	8	14	10	8	3	18	-	-	-	-	-	-	61
3	(United Kingdom) Stobart M-Sport Ford Rally Team	8	8	6	5	10	7	-	-	-	-	-	-	44
4	(France) Citroën Junior Team	5	2	4	0	2	6	-	-	-	-	-	-	19
5	(Argentina) Munchi's Ford World Rally Team	0	0	3	4	5	0	-	-	-	-	-	-	12
