= PH Sport =

Motorsport company and team

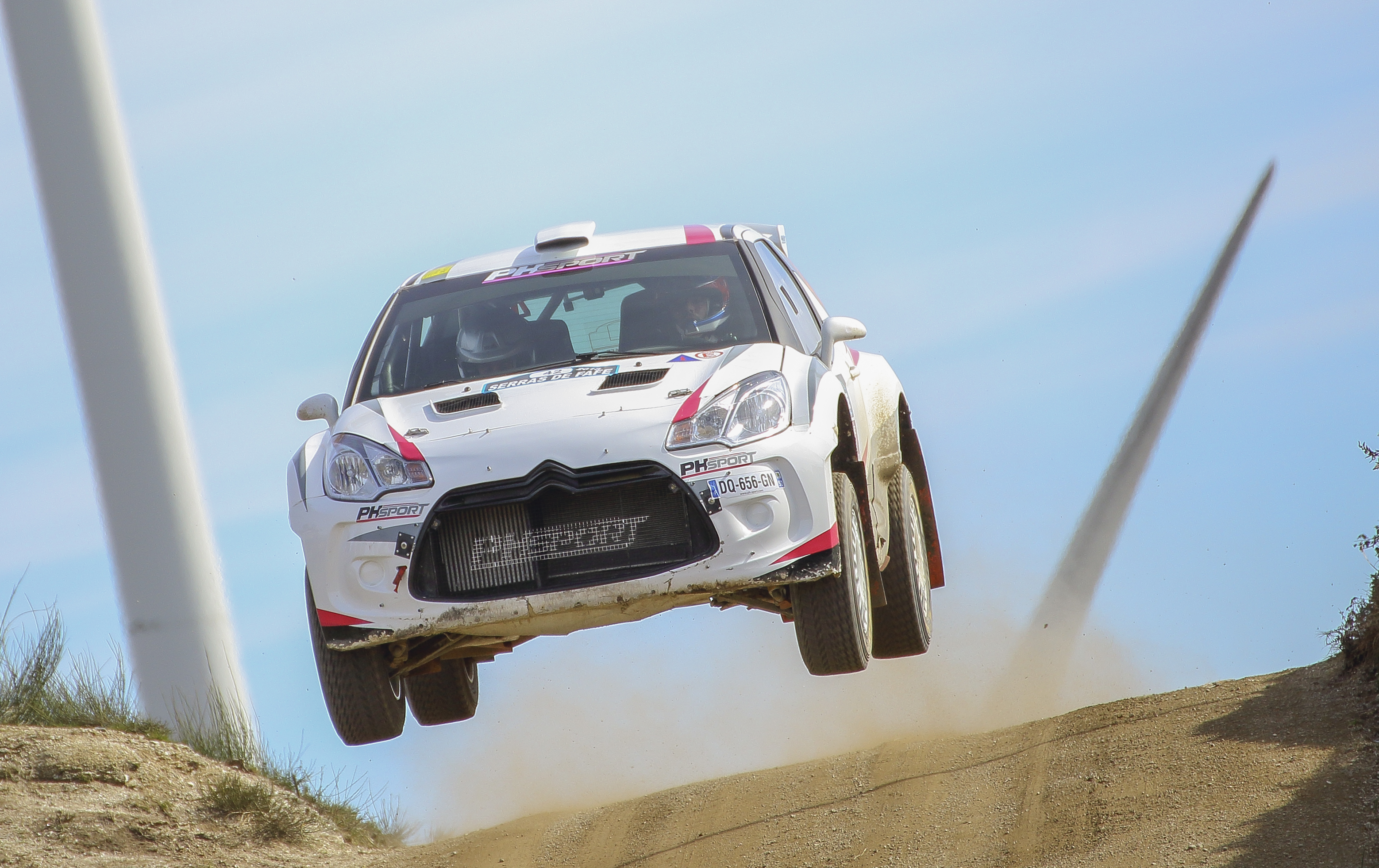
- Industry: Motorsport
- Founded: July 17, 1990; 36 years ago
- Founders: Bernard Piallat and David Henry
- Headquarters: Langres, France
- Website: ph-sport.com/en/

(France) PH Sport
- Team principal(s): Coralie Barbassat (team coordinator)
- Current series: WRC2
- Former series: World Rally-Raid Championship
- Current drivers: Yohan Rossel; Léo Rossel

PH Sport is a motorsport services company based in Langres, France, established in 1990. The company has a history of entering national and international rallies and championships such as the World Rally Championship, often in close cooperation with automobile manufacturers Citroën and Peugeot, and the Equipe de France team of the French Federation of Automobile Sport (FFSA).

The company also enters off-road rallies such as the Dakar Rally and others of the World Rally-Raid Championship using Peugeot vehicles in the car classes, and the Zephyr in the lightweight Group T3 class, designed and built by themselves.

== History ==
PH Sport was founded on 17 July 1990 by Bernard Piallat, a mechanic, and David Henry, a bodywork specialist. Prior to starting the company, the founders had entered rallies as a crew pair, with Henry driving and Piallat co-driving.

In September 1998, Henry retired and sold his stake in the company.

In January 2010, Sébastien Loeb and his business partner and early backer Dominique Heintz acquired a stake in the company through their venture, Sébastien Loeb Racing. Differences of opinion with Piallat on the future of the company appeared after a few months, with Heintz and Loeb both keen to expand operations to circuit competitions. Both men sold their stake in October 2011.

== Notable partnerships ==
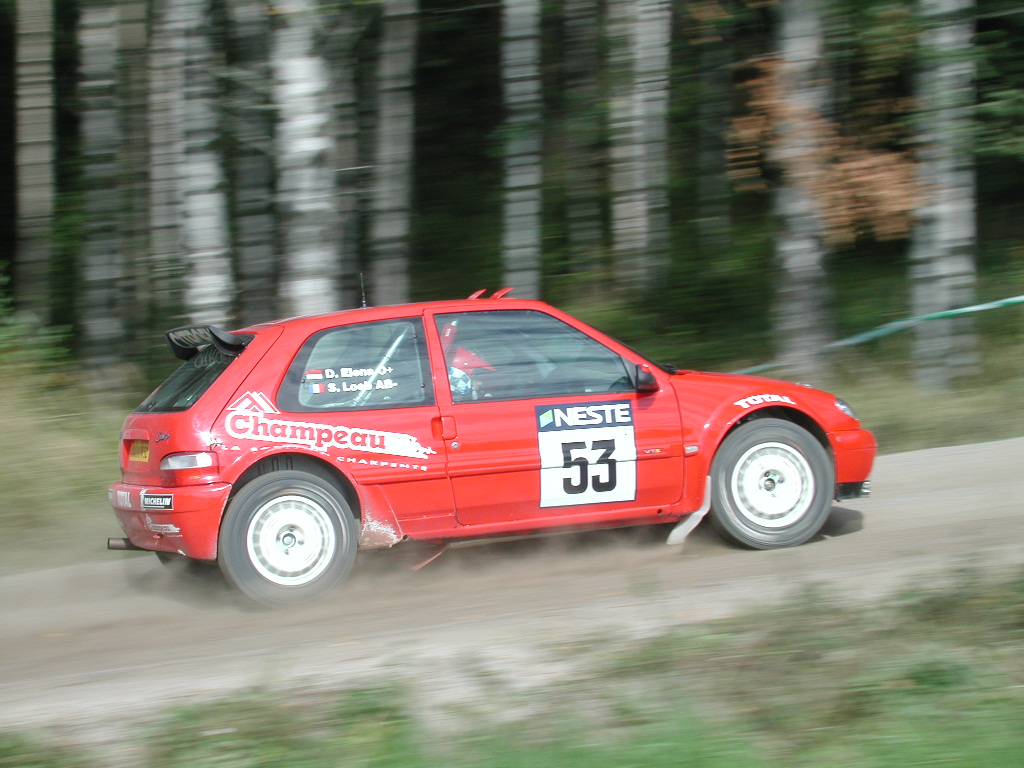
Sébastien Loeb in PH Sport's Citroën Saxo S1600, 2001 Rally Finland

=== Sébastien Loeb's early rally career ===
Piallet first heard of Sébastien Loeb in 1997. Over the following three years, with backing from the FFSA and Citroën Sport, PH Sport prepared Citroën Saxo Kit Cars in which he competed in France's Citroën Trophy and the French national rally championships. Loeb was victorious in the Trophy in 1999, and in 2000, won the 2wd French gravel championship.

In 2001, the company ran the Citroën Saxo Super 1600 in which Loeb became FIA Super 1600 Champion by winning all five events they started. The series, consisting of international rallies on the WRC calendar, was renamed Junior World Rally Championship the following year.

=== Sébastien Ogier ===
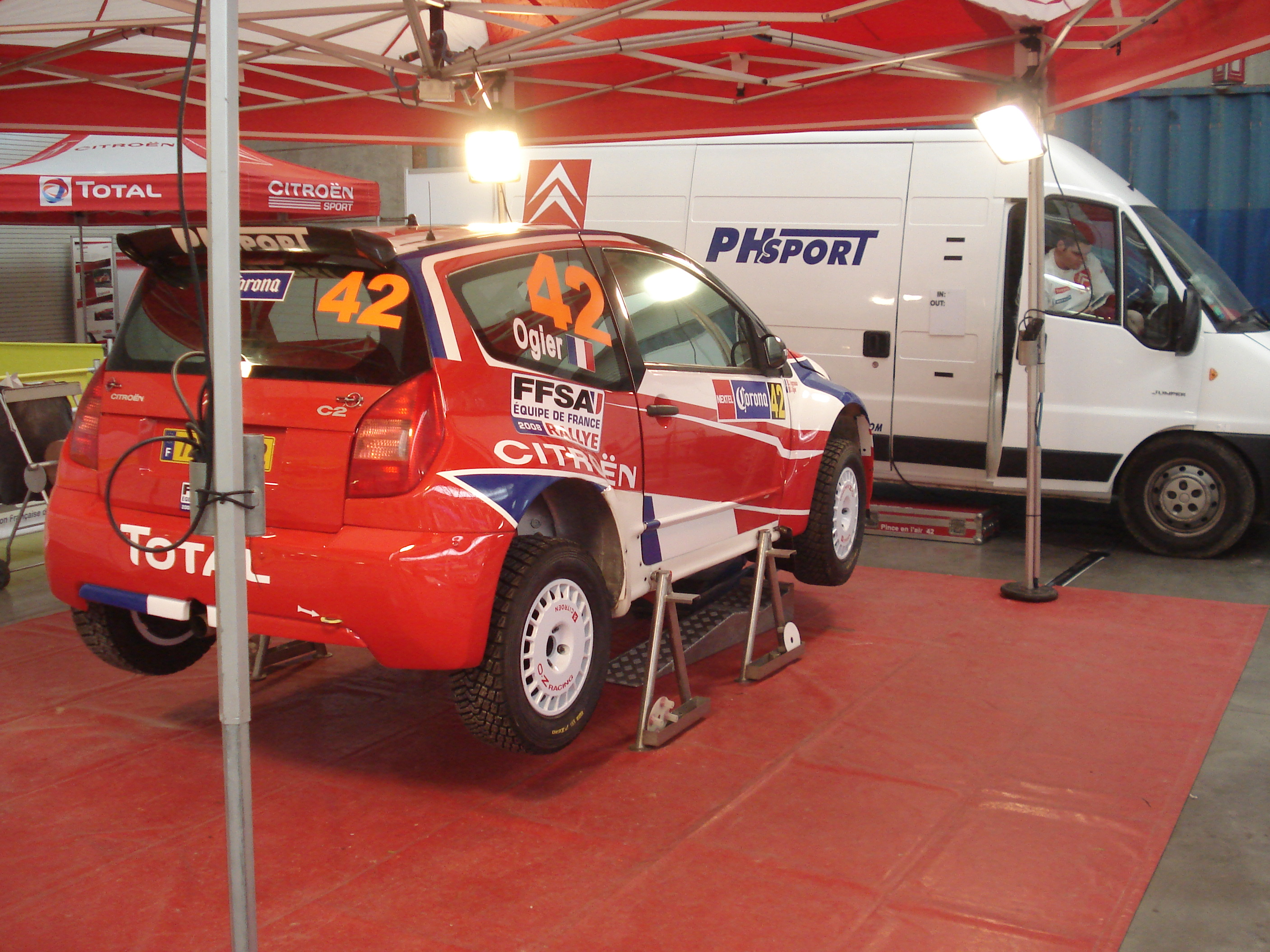
Sébastien Ogier's Citroën C2 S1600, 2008 Rally Mexico

The Equipe de France team entered into the 2008 Junior World Rally Championship with Citroën Sport backed Sébastien Ogier driving their C2 Super 1600. PH Sport ran the car on events, leading to Ogier winning the drivers championship thanks to three event wins. This performance convinced the Equipe and Citroën to enter Ogier into the season finale at Rally GB in a C4 WRC car which PH Sport ran.

For the following two years, the company worked with Ogier whilst operating the Citroën Junior Team in the top class of the WRC. Ogier won twice, Rally de Portugal and Rally Japan in 2009, and scored several podiums.

== World Rally Championship ==
=== Citroën Racing Technologies ===
PH Sport ran operations for customers of Citroën Racing Technologies (also CRT, formerly Citroën Sport Technologies), the sub-division of Citroën Racing established to facilitate customer racing at the top level of the World Rally Championship. New or recent World Rally Cars were supplied by CRT, and Benoit Nogier effectively became team principal to several customer teams.

==== 2008 ====
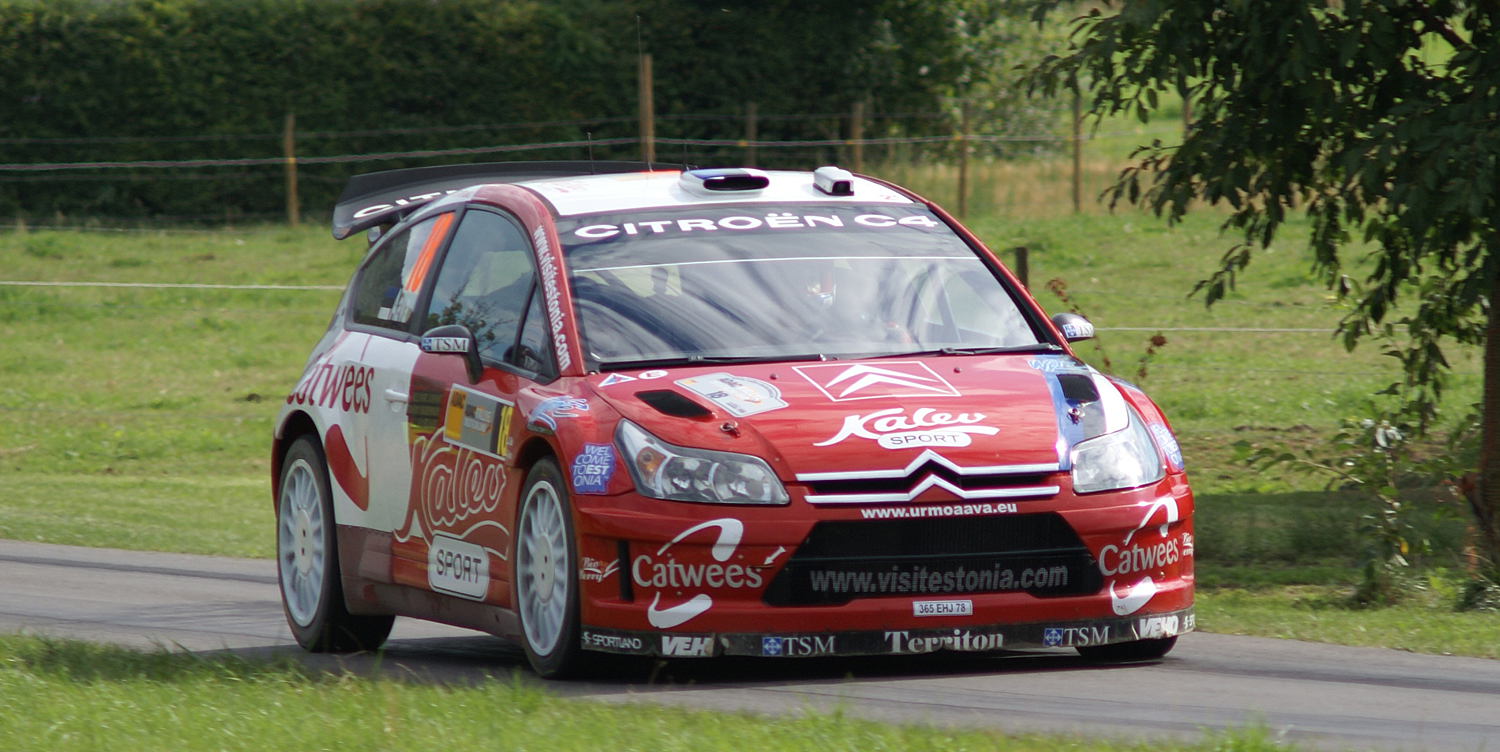
Urmo Aava in a PH Sport ran C4 WRC, 2008

In 2008, these customers were Estonian Urmo Aava, running in World Rally Team Estonia, and Zimbabwean privateer Conrad Rautenbach, as well as for Ogier on behalf of the Equipe de France in the final round.

==== 2009–2010 ====
In 2009, the Citroën Junior Team was created which collated the privateer customers with Citroën-sponsored drivers into a second Citroën team scoring points in the Manufacturers championship. The team was presented as an opportunity to develop young drivers, a tactic to support the senior team, and to also add value to the championship following the withdrawal of Subaru and Suzuki at the end of 2008. Australian Chris Atkinson, claimed as one of two Citroën proteges, only entered the first round although Ogier had more starts. They were joined by otherwise privateers Evgeny Novikov and Rautenbach who were occasionally nominated for manufacturer points. For the final round only, Petter Solberg and Aaron Burkart joined the team.

The Citroën Junior Team was entered again in 2010, with former Formula One world champion Kimi Räikkönen joining Ogier as the regular starters, although Dani Sordo of the senior team traded places with Ogier for three rallies.

==== 2011 ====
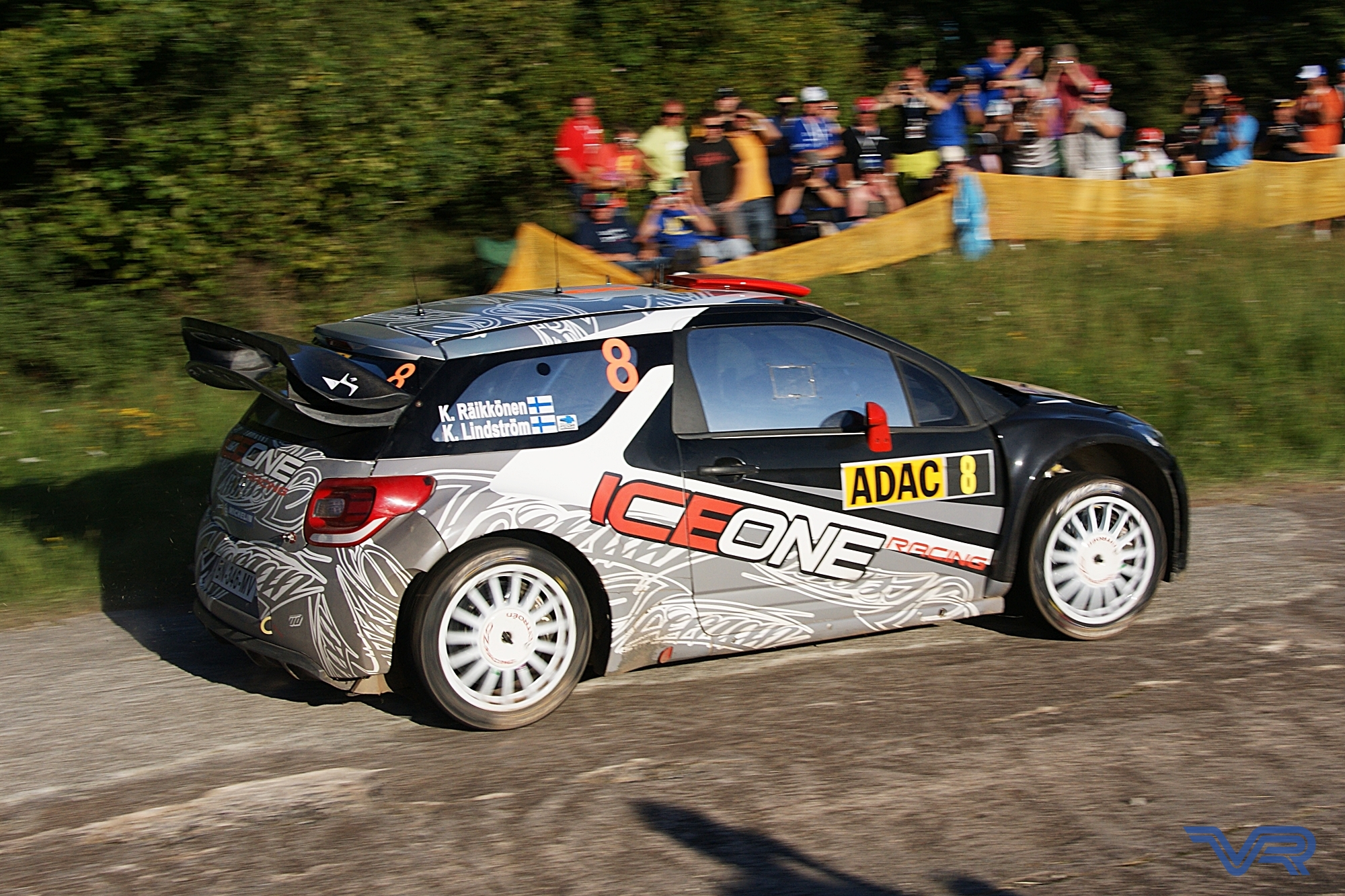
Kimi Räikkönen, 2011 Rallye Deutschland

In 2011 the WRC rules were relaxed, allowing non-manufacturer teams to compete in the manufacturers championship with the latest cars and with a minimum obligation of only 7 rounds. The new rules also provided for privateers to enter under their own or sponsor's name without need for the manufacturer's name, and could do so with only one car in the team.

Räikkönen entered as the only driver under the team name Ice One Racing, although the team were excluded from the manufacturers championship when he did not start Rally Australia, one of his two nominated rounds outside Europe. Petter Solberg also entered as the only driver in his team, Petter Solberg World Rally Team, ran by PH Sport. His car was found to be underweight by the stewards during Rally France resulting in exclusion from the final classification. Despite this, his team finished fourth in the manufacturers championship, behind only works Ford and Citroën teams and ahead of 6 others. Dutchman Peter van Merksteijn also entered the manufacturers championship under the name Van Merksteijn Motorsport, again operated by the company.

==== 2012 ====
In 2012, the Junior Team was revived for Thierry Neuville who completed all but two rounds with the team. For the other two rallies, he competed for the Qatar World Rally Team which was also established in 2012, principally for Nasser Al-Attiyah. Chris Atkinson was also invited to compete in Rally Finland whilst Al-Attiyah competed at the London summer Olympics. Dutchman Hans Weijs contested the final round in Spain for the team.

Citroën did not enter privateer teams into the WRC from 2013 and there appears to be no use of the term Citroën Racing Technologies since. However, the Customer Racing department was established from 2013 to handle business surrounding the DS3 R5, R3 and R1 cars which, including the World Rally Cars, were sold to third parties like PH Sport for entry into competition.

=== Abu Dhabi Total WRT 2016 ===
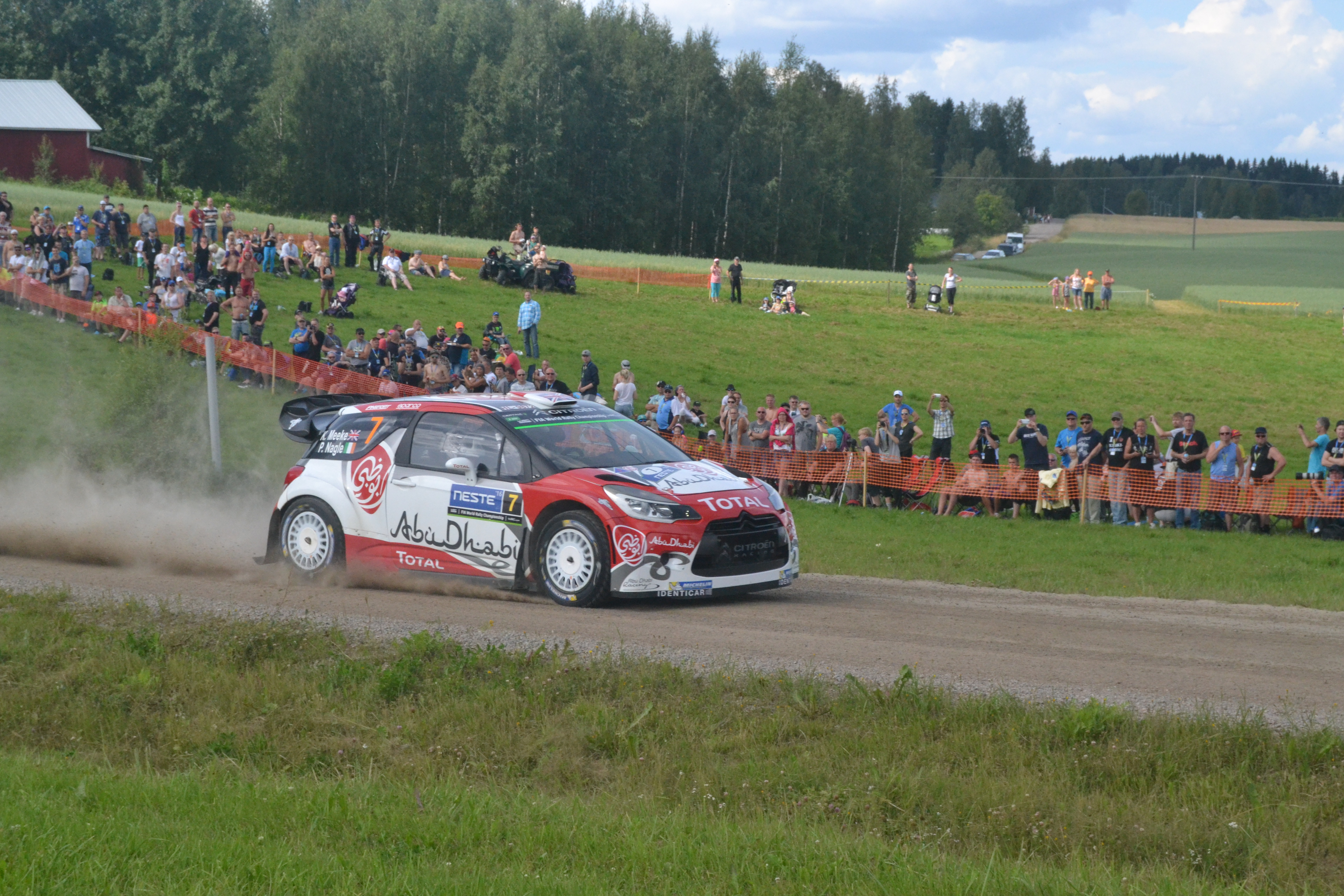
Kris Meeke, Rally Finland 2016

Citroën withdrew its World Rally Team from the WRC in 2016 in order to focus resources on developing a new regulation car for use in the 2017 season onwards. Although, they continued to support the team unofficially, asking PH Sport to run the Abu Dhabi Total WRT on most events with drivers Kris Meeke, Craig Breen and Khalid Al-Qassimi, with occasional drives from Stephane Lefebvre, Marcos Ligato, Quentin Gilbert and José Alberto Nicolas. Meeke's win in Rally Finland at 126.6 km/h (78.7 mph) set the record for the fastest average speed in the history of the World Rally Championship. This record remains as of February 2023.

=== World Rally Car Privateers ===
In 2006, the company supplied a Xsara WRC for Janne Tuohino to compete in two rounds of the WRC, Rally Sweden and Rally Finland. The following year, Gigi Galli entered three rounds of the WRC in a PH Sport supplied Xsara WRC although he chose an Italian team to run rally operations. The team facilitated Bryan Bouffier in 2013 with a DS3 WRC. A C3 World Rally Car was offered by the company from 2018, but there is no evidence that anybody used it in competition.

=== WRC2 & WRC3 ===
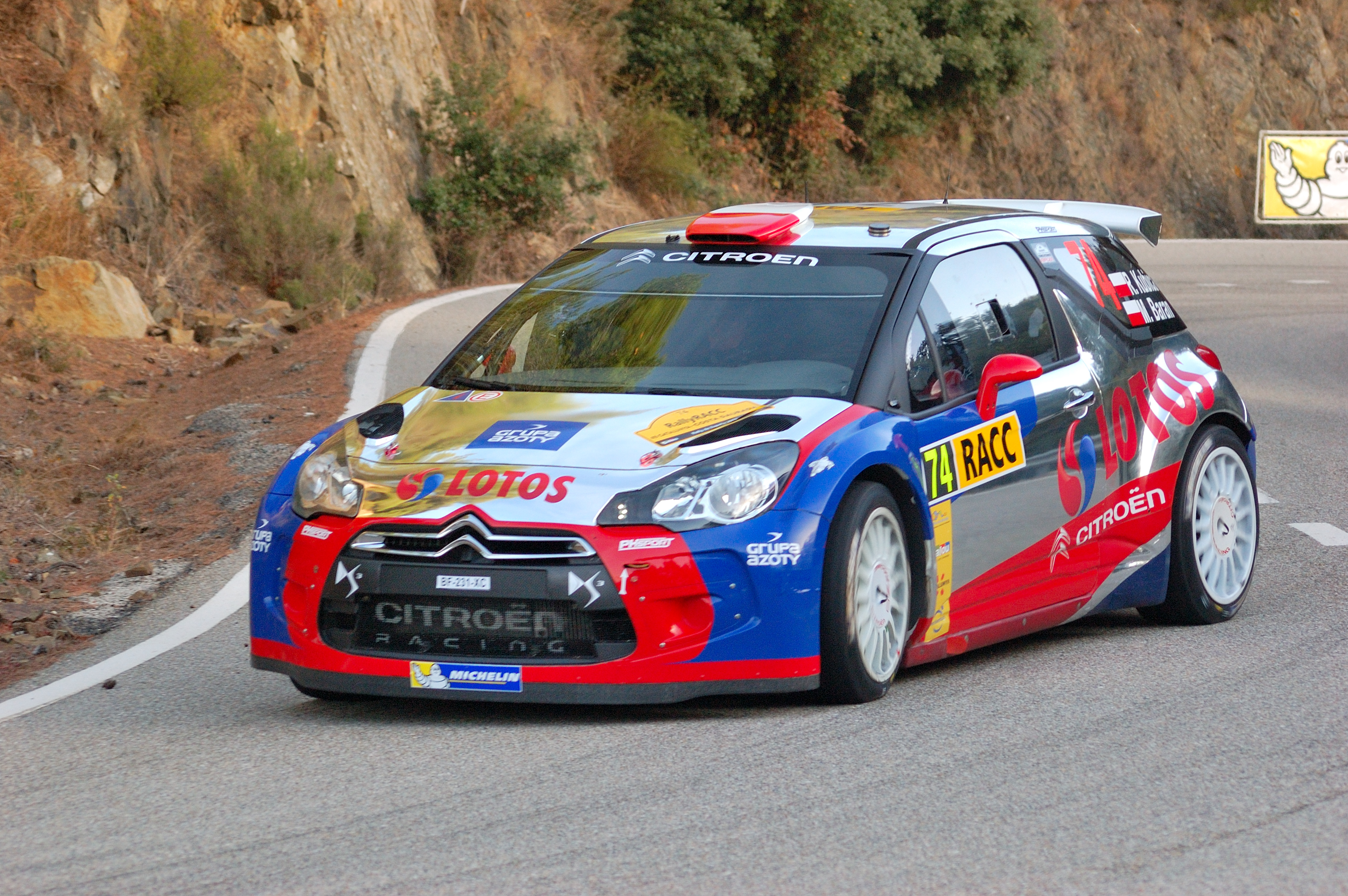
Robert Kubica in PH Sport's DS3 RRC, Rally Spain 2013

Although supported by Citroën, Robert Kubica drove a car supplied by PH Sport in the WRC and WRC2 championships in 2013, the season he won the WRC2. He drove a modified DS3 RRC with a paddle-gearshift for use by his left hand due to injuries sustained to his right hand in an accident. The company also supplied cars and services to enable Mads Østberg to become WRC2 champion in 2020.

Between 2013 and 2016, Sébastien Chardonnet, Stéphane Lefebvre and Quentin Gilbert all drove PH Sport supplied cars for assaults on WRC3 and Citroën's in-house championship, Citroën Top Driver. Lefebvre won the WRC3 championship in 2014. Yohan Rossel also won the championship in 2021 in a Group Rally2 car.

=== Junior WRC ===
In 2001, PH Sport ran the Citroën Saxo VTS S1600 that Sébastien Loeb won the Super-1600 Championship for Drivers with. This was followed in 2002 with a Junior World Rally Championship title win for Spaniard Dani Sola. PH also ran cars for Italian Andrea Dallavilla and Finn Janne Tuohino.

In 2006 they entered Julien Pressac, and in 2007, Conrad Rautenbach and Yoann Bonato contested the championship in C2 S1600.

In 2008, Sébastien Ogier won the JWRC drivers championship, whilst PH also assisted entries for Irishman Shaun Gallagher

Besides winning WRC3 in 2015, Lefebvre also won Junior WRC in 2014.

== Other ==
The company supplied a car for Formula One driver Valtteri Bottas to test, however the Finn has not entered any championships.
