= Eurolamp WRT =

Ukrainian rally team

- Full name: Eurolamp World Rally Team
- Base: Kyiv, Ukraine
- Team principal(s): (Ukraine) Valeriy Gorban
- Drivers: (Ukraine) Valeriy Gorban (Ukraine) Oleksiy Kikireshko (Ukraine) Oleksandr Saliuk, Jr. (former) (Estonia) Mait Maarend
- Co-drivers: (Ukraine) Volodymir Korsia (Estonia) Sergei Larens (Ukraine) Pavlo Cherepin (former) (Estonia) Mihkel Kapp
- Chassis: Mini John Cooper Works WRC
- Tyres: Michelin

World Rally Championship history
- Debut: 2009 Rally Poland
- Last event: 2017 Rally Mexico
- Manufacturers' Championships: 0
- Drivers' Championships: 0
- Rally wins: 0

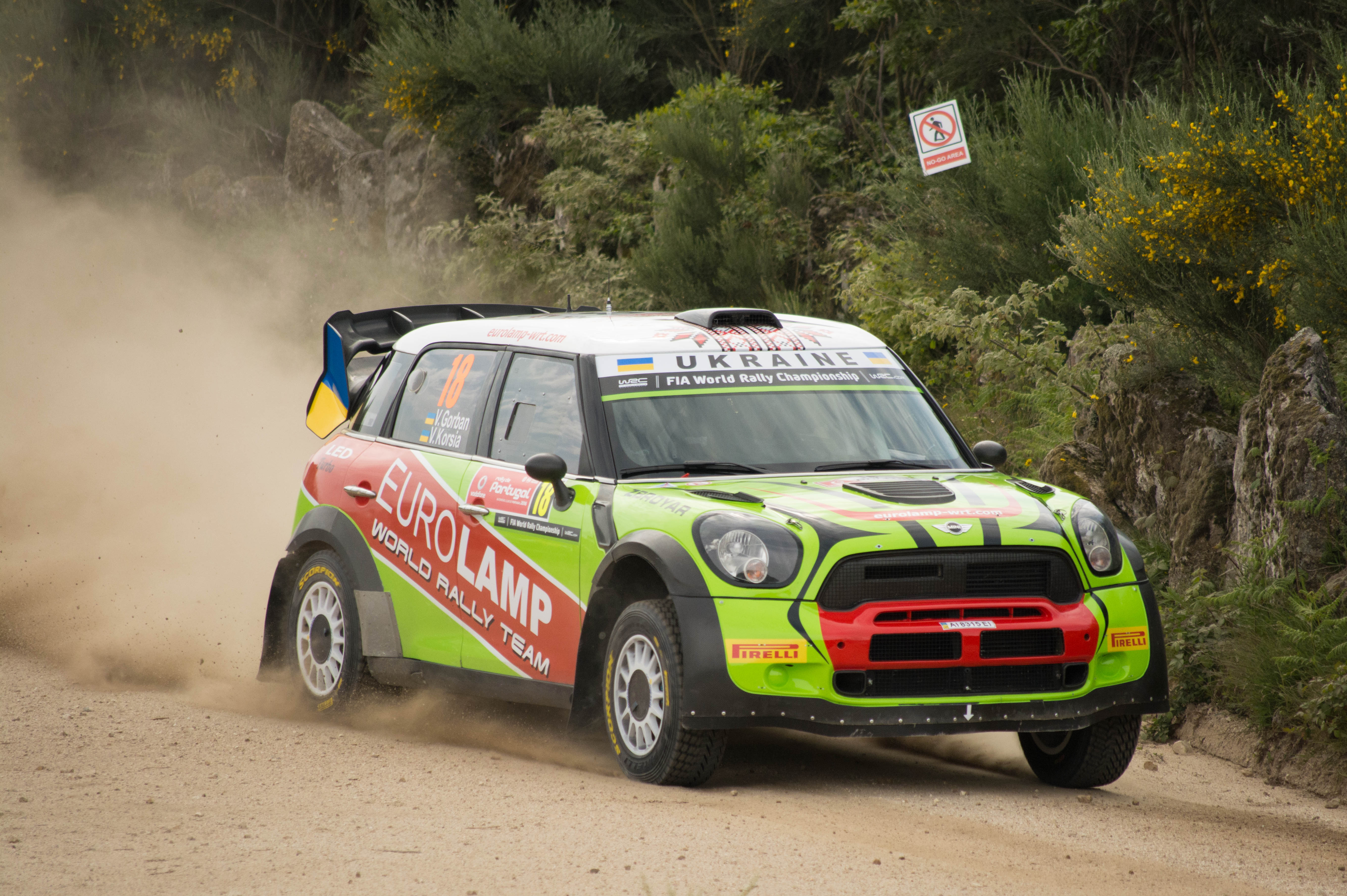
Valeriy Gorban at the 2016 Rally de Portugal

Eurolamp World Rally Team, or Eurolamp WRT for short (previously Mentos Ascania Racing), was a Ukrainian rally team that used to compete in the World Rally Championship-2.

== History ==
In 2002 the founder of a Ukrainian product distributor Ascania Group Valeriy Gorban founded a racing team to compete in the Ukrainian Rally Championship. The original name of the team was the MacCoffee Rally Team, named after a coffee brand being imported to Ukraine by the Ascania Group under the deal with Singapore's Future Enterprises. To race for the team Valeriy hired the famous Ukrainian drivers Oleksandr Saliuk and his son Oleksandr Saliuk Jr. previously racing for Khors Air. While Saliuk Jr. retained his Lada Samara, his father switched from Ford Escort RS Cosworth, imported back in 1994, to Mitsubishi Lancer Evolution VII which was present at the team's launch event at Bingo night club in Kyiv.

Valeriy Gorban entered a Mitsubishi Lancer Evolution IX in the 2009 Rally Poland. The team expanded to include a second car during the 2010 season for Oleksandr Saliuk, Jr., and a third car for Oleksiy Kikireshko in 2011, and contesting the World Rally Championship for Group N Production Cars. The team returned in 2012, with Gorban placing third overall in the Production championship, scoring a class victory at the Acropolis Rally and podium finishes at the Rally Argentina and Rally d'Italia. The team's best result overall to date was eighth place at the 2011 Rally Australia, achieved by Saliuk, who left the team at the end of the season.

Following the introduction of Group R regulations in 2013 and the restructuring of the secondary World Rally Championship categories, Eurolamp switched to campaigning in the WRC-2 with Mini John Cooper Works S2000 cars supported by British motorsport firm Prodrive.

== Complete WRC results ==
=== Overall classifications ===
Year	Entrant	Driver	Car	1	2	3	4	5	6	7	8	9	10	11	12	13	14	WDC	Points
2009	(Ukraine) Mentos Ascania Racing	(Ukraine) Valeriy Gorban	Mitsubishi Lancer Evolution IX	IRL	NOR	CYP	POR	ARG	ITA	GRC	POL; 14	FIN	AUS	ESP	GBR			NC	0
2010	(Ukraine) Mentos Ascania Racing	(Ukraine) Valeriy Gorban	Mitsubishi Lancer Evolution IX	SWE	MEX	JOR	TUR; DNS	NZL	POR	BUL	FIN	GER	JPN	FRA	ESP	GBR		NC	0
2010	(Ukraine) Mentos Ascania Racing	(Ukraine) Oleksandr Saliuk, Jr.	Mitsubishi Lancer Evolution IX	SWE	MEX	JOR	TUR; Ret	NZL	POR	BUL	FIN	GER	JPN	FRA	ESP	GBR		NC	0
2011	(Ukraine) Mentos Ascania Racing	(Ukraine) Valeriy Gorban	Mitsubishi Lancer Evolution IX	SWE; 22	MEX	POR; 19	JOR	ITA	ARG	GRE	FIN; 40	GER	AUS; 12	FRA	ESP; 32	GBR; 34		NC	0
2011	(Ukraine) Mentos Ascania Racing	(Ukraine) Oleksiy Kikireshko	Mitsubishi Lancer Evolution IX	SWE; Ret	MEX	POR; 30	JOR	ITA	ARG	GRE	FIN; 51	GER	AUS; Ret	FRA	ESP; 35	GBR; 23		NC	0
2011	(Ukraine) Mentos Ascania Racing	(Ukraine) Oleksandr Saliuk, Jr.	Mitsubishi Lancer Evolution IX	SWE; 32	MEX	POR; 20	JOR	ITA	ARG	GRE	FIN; Ret	GER	AUS; 8	FRA	ESP; 30	GBR; 25		24th	4
2012	(Ukraine) Mentos Ascania Racing	(Ukraine) Valeriy Gorban	Mitsubishi Lancer Evolution IX	MON	SWE	MEX	POR	ARG; 14	GRE; 14	NZL; 20	FIN	GER; 34	GBR	FRA	ITA; 16	ESP; 27		NC	0
2012	(Ukraine) Mentos Ascania Racing	(Ukraine) Oleksiy Kikireshko	Mitsubishi Lancer Evolution IX	MON	SWE	MEX	POR	ARG; Ret	GRE; Ret	NZL; Ret	FIN	GER; Ret	GBR	FRA	ITA; 20	ESP; 40		NC	0
2013	(Ukraine) Mentos Ascania Racing	(Ukraine) Valeriy Gorban	Mini John Cooper Works S2000	MON	SWE	MEX	POR; Ret	ARG	GRE; 18	ITA; Ret	FIN; 18	GER	AUS	FRA; Ret	ESP	GBR; 15		NC	0
2013	(Ukraine) Mentos Ascania Racing	(Ukraine) Oleksiy Kikireshko	Mini John Cooper Works S2000	MON	SWE	MEX	POR; Ret	ARG	GRE; 19	ITA; Ret	FIN; 20	GER	AUS	FRA; Ret	ESP	GBR; Ret		NC	0
2014	(Ukraine) Eurolamp WRT	(Ukraine) Valeriy Gorban	Mini John Cooper Works S2000	MON	SWE; 21	MEX	POR; 18	ARG	ITA; 31	POL; 15	FIN; 31	GER	AUS	FRA	ESP; 23	GBR; 19		NC	0
2015	(Ukraine) Eurolamp WRT	(Ukraine) Valeriy Gorban	Mini John Cooper Works S2000	MON	SWE; 15	MEX; Ret	ARG	POR; 18	ITA; 18	POL; Ret	FIN; Ret	GER	AUS	FRA	ESP	GBR		NC	0
2015	(Ukraine) Eurolamp WRT	(Ukraine) Oleksiy Kikireshko	Mini John Cooper Works S2000	MON	SWE; 24	MEX	ARG	POR	ITA	POL	FIN	GER	AUS	FRA	ESP	GBR		NC	0
2016	(Ukraine) Eurolamp WRT	(Ukraine) Valeriy Gorban	Mini John Cooper Works WRC	MON	SWE; 24	MEX; 10	ARG; Ret	POR; Ret	ITA; 28	POL; 27	FIN; 21	GER	CHN; C	FRA	ESP; 15	GBR; 38	AUS	25th	1
2016	(Ukraine) Eurolamp WRT	(Estonia) Mait Maarend	Mini John Cooper Works WRC	MON	SWE; 34	MEX	ARG	POR	ITA; Ret	POL	FIN	GER	CHN; C	FRA	ESP	GBR	AUS	NC	0
2017	(Ukraine) Eurolamp WRT	(Ukraine) Valeriy Gorban	Mini John Cooper Works WRC	MON	SWE; 20	MEX; 13	FRA	ARG	POR	ITA	POL	FIN	GER	ESP	GBR	AUS		-*	0*

=== By class ===
Year	Class	Entrant	Driver	Car	1	2	3	4	5	6	7	8	9	10	11	12	13	Pos.	Points
2011	PWRC	(Ukraine) Mentos Ascania Racing	(Ukraine) Valeriy Gorban	Mitsubishi Lancer Evolution IX	SWE; 4	POR; 5	ARG	FIN; 6	AUS; 5	ESP; 7	GBR; 9							7th	46
2011	PWRC	(Ukraine) Mentos Ascania Racing	(Ukraine) Oleksiy Kikireshko	Mitsubishi Lancer Evolution IX	SWE; Ret	POR; 11	ARG	FIN; 7	AUS; Ret	ESP; 9	GBR; 6							14th	14
2011	PWRC	(Ukraine) Mentos Ascania Racing	(Ukraine) Oleksandr Saliuk, Jr.	Mitsubishi Lancer Evolution IX	SWE; 7	POR; 6	ARG	FIN; Ret	AUS; 3	ESP; 5	GBR; 8							8th	43
2012	PWRC	(Ukraine) Mentos Ascania Racing	(Ukraine) Valeriy Gorban	Mitsubishi Lancer Evolution IX	MON	MEX	ARG; 3	GRE; 1	NZL; 4	GER; 7	ITA; 3	ESP; 4						3rd	85
2012	PWRC	(Ukraine) Mentos Ascania Racing	(Ukraine) Oleksiy Kikireshko	Mitsubishi Lancer Evolution IX	MON	MEX	ARG; Ret	GRE; Ret	NZL; Ret	GER; Ret	ITA; 5	ESP; 11						NC	0
2013	WRC2	(Ukraine) Mentos Ascania Racing	(Ukraine) Valeriy Gorban	Mini John Cooper Works S2000	MON	SWE	MEX	POR; Ret	ARG	GRE; 8	ITA; Ret	FIN; 9	GER	AUS	FRA; Ret	ESP	GBR; 7	28th	12
2013	WRC2	(Ukraine) Mentos Ascania Racing	(Ukraine) Oleksiy Kikireshko	Mini John Cooper Works S2000	MON	SWE	MEX	POR; Ret	ARG	GRE; 9	ITA; Ret	FIN; 8	GER	AUS	FRA; Ret	ESP	GBR; Ret	33rd	6
2014	WRC2	(Ukraine) Eurolamp WRT	(Ukraine) Valeriy Gorban	Mini John Cooper Works S2000	MON	SWE; 7	MEX	POR; 8	ARG	ITA; 15	POL; 4	FIN; 7	GER	AUS	FRA	ESP; 6	GBR; 7	10th	42
2015	WRC2	(Ukraine) Eurolamp WRT	(Ukraine) Valeriy Gorban	Mini John Cooper Works S2000	MON	SWE; 3	MEX; Ret	ARG	POR; 8	ITA; 10	POL; Ret	FIN; Ret	GER	AUS	FRA	ESP	GBR	17th	20
2015	WRC2	(Ukraine) Eurolamp WRT	(Ukraine) Oleksiy Kikireshko	Mini John Cooper Works S2000	MON	SWE; 8	MEX	ARG	POR	ITA	POL	FIN	GER	AUS	FRA	ESP	GBR	36th	4
2017	WRCT	(Ukraine) Eurolamp WRT	(Ukraine) Valeriy Gorban	Mini John Cooper Works WRC	MON	SWE; 1	MEX; 1	FRA	ARG	POR	ITA	POL	FIN	GER	ESP	GBR	AUS	1st*	50*

Notes:

- Rallies marked in italics were not contested as a round of the championship.
