= Oleksiy Kikireshko =

Ukrainian rally driver

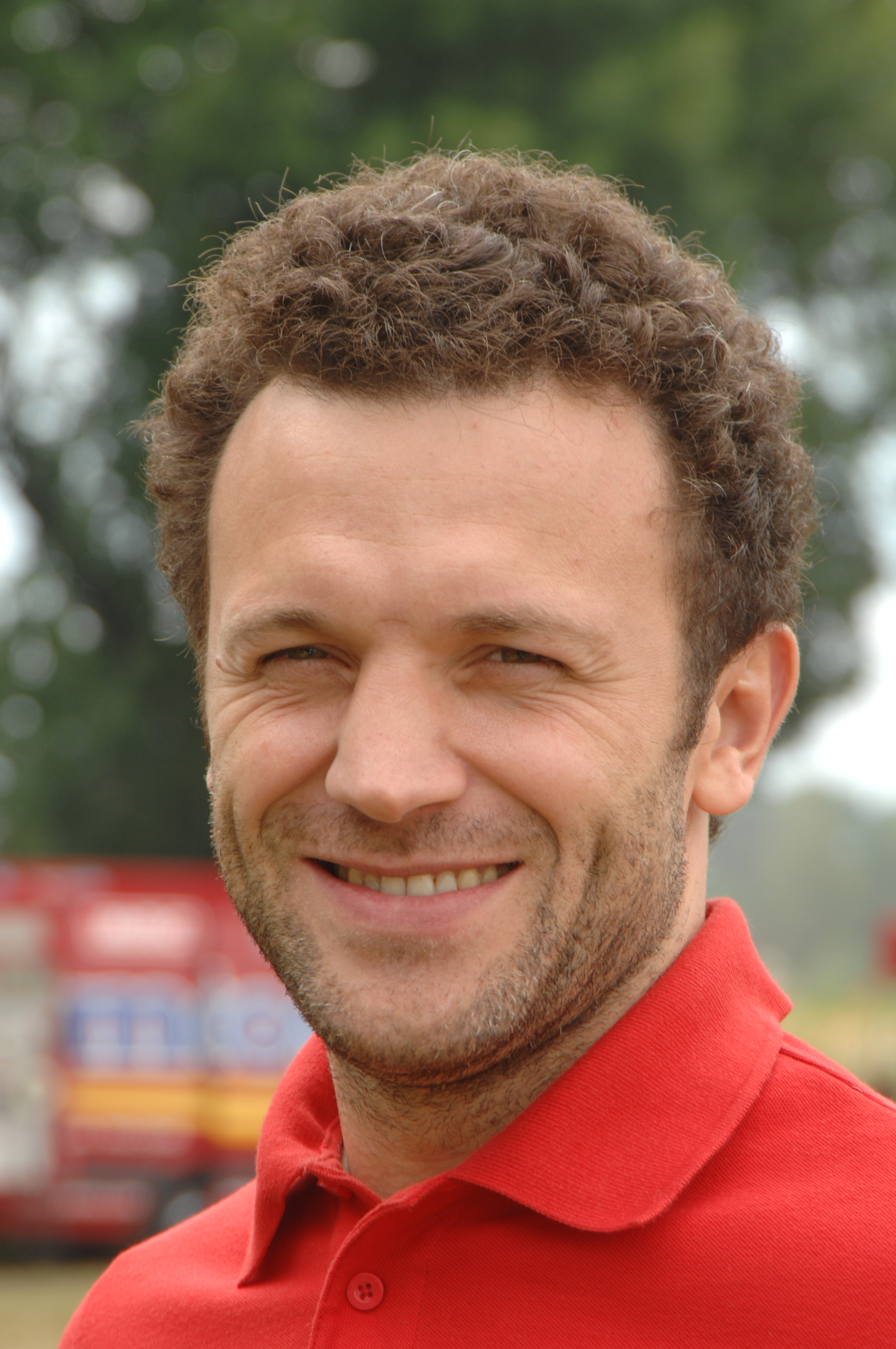
- Nationality: (Ukraine) Ukrainian
- Full name: Oleksiy Viktorovych Kikireshko
- Born: February 20, 1977 (age 49) Bilhorod-Dnistrovsky, Soviet Union (now Ukraine)

Porsche Endurance Trophy Nürburgring career
- Debut season: 2023
- Current team: SRS Team Sorg Rennsport

Previous series
- 2005–2006 2009–2013 2010 2011 2011–2015 2023– 2024– 2025–: URC; URC; UCRC; 24H of Nürburgring; WRC; Porsche Endurance Trophy; 24H of Nürburgring; Middle East Trophy

World Rally Championship record
- Years active: 2011–2015
- Teams: Mentos Ascania Racing
- Rallies: 22
- Championships: 0
- Rally wins: 0
- Podiums: 0
- Stage wins: 0
- Total points: 0
- First rally: 2011 Rally Sweden
- Last rally: 2015 Rally Sweden
Association football career
- Height: 1.79 m (5 ft 10 in)
- Position: Striker
Senior career*
| Years | Team | Apps | (Gls) |
| 2014–2017 | Arsenal Kyiv | 12 | (3) |
- * Club domestic league appearances and goals as of 19 February 2022

Oleksiy Kikireshko (Ukrainian: Олексій Вікторович Кікірешко, born 20 February 1977) is a rally driver from Ukraine. In 2011, Kikireshko contested in the Production World Rally Championship (PWRC) with the Mentos Ascania Racing Team driving a Mitsubishi Lancer Evo IX.

Also from 2014, Kikireshko began a professional association football career as a striker for FC Arsenal Kyiv.

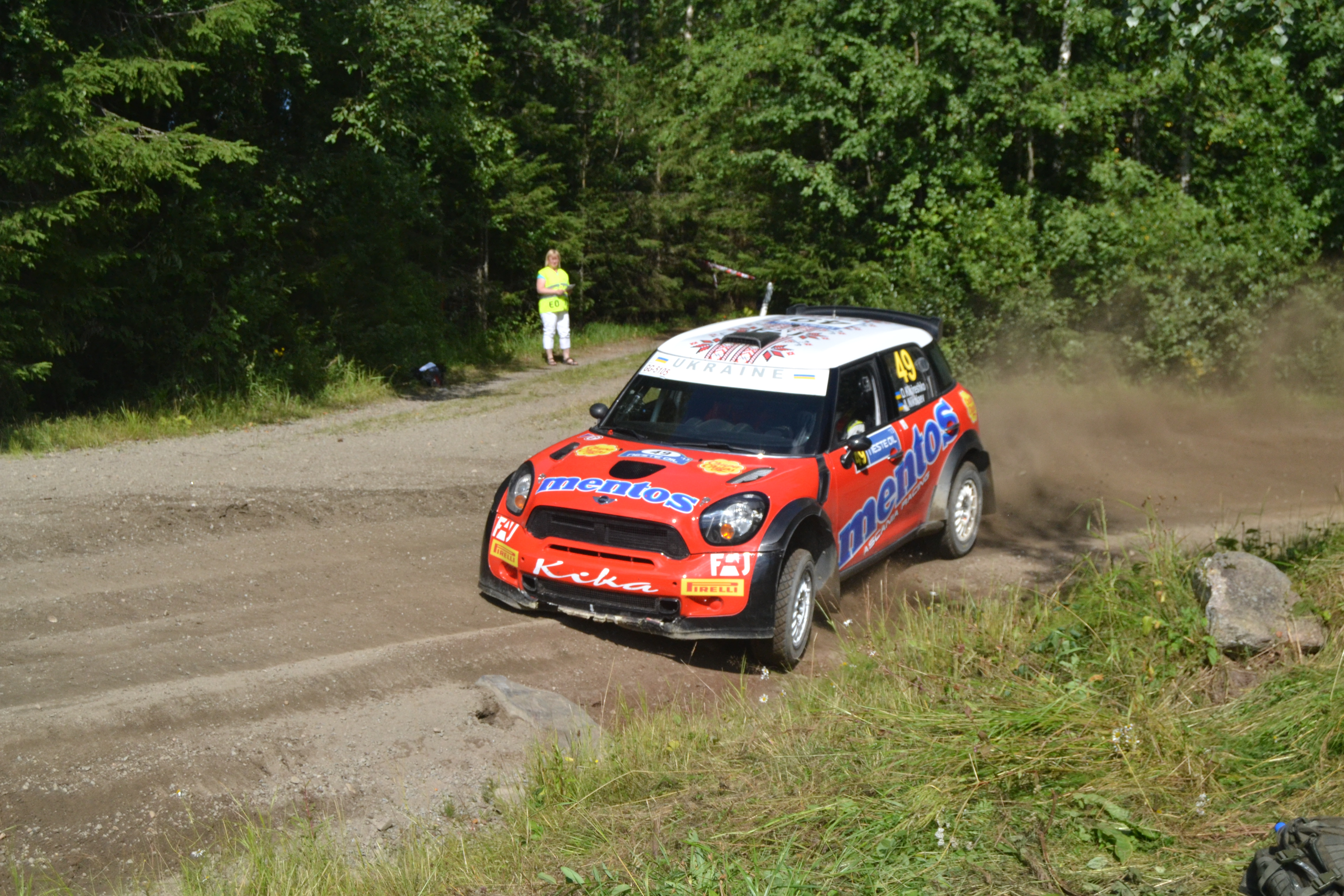
Kikireshko at 2013 Rally Finland

== Racing record ==
=== WRC results ===
| Year | Entrant | Car | 1 | 2 | 3 | 4 | 5 | 6 | 7 | 8 | 9 | 10 | 11 | 12 | 13 | WDC | Points |
|---|---|---|---|---|---|---|---|---|---|---|---|---|---|---|---|---|---|
| 2011 | Mentos Ascania Racing | Mitsubishi Lancer Evo IX | SWE; Ret | MEX | POR; 30 | JOR | ITA | ARG | GRE | FIN; 51 | GER | AUS; Ret | FRA | ESP; 35 | GBR; 23 | NC | 0 |
| 2012 | Mentos Ascania Racing | Mitsubishi Lancer Evo IX | MON | SWE | MEX | POR | ARG; Ret | GRE; Ret | NZL; Ret | FIN | GER; Ret | GBR | FRA | ITA; 20 | ESP; 40 | NC | 0 |
| 2013 | Oleksiy Kikireshko | Mini John Cooper Works S2000 | MON | SWE; 18 | MEX | | | | | | | | | | | NC | 0 |
| 2013 | Mentos Ascania Racing | Mini John Cooper Works S2000 | | | | POR; Ret | ARG | GRE; 19 | ITA; Ret | FIN; 20 | GER | AUS | FRA; Ret | ESP | GBR; Ret | NC | 0 |
| 2014 | Oleksiy Kikireshko | Mini John Cooper Works S2000 | MON | SWE | MEX | POR; Ret | ARG | ITA | POL | | | | | | | NC | 0 |
| 2014 | Oleksiy Kikireshko | Ford Fiesta R5 | | | | | | | | FIN; Ret | GER | AUS | FRA | ESP | GBR | NC | 0 |
| 2015 | Eurolamp World Rally Team | Mini John Cooper Works S2000 | MON | SWE; 24 | MEX | ARG | POR | ITA | POL | FIN | GER | AUS | FRA | ESP | GBR | NC | 0 |

==== PWRC results ====
| Year | Entrant | Car | 1 | 2 | 3 | 4 | 5 | 6 | 7 | 8 | PWRC | Points |
|---|---|---|---|---|---|---|---|---|---|---|---|---|
| 2011 | Mentos Ascania Racing | Mitsubishi Lancer Evo IX | SWE; Ret | POR; 11 | ARG | FIN; 7 | AUS; Ret | ESP; 9 | GBR; 6 | | 14th | 14 |
| 2012 | Mentos Ascania Racing | Mitsubishi Lancer Evo IX | MON | MEX | ARG; Ret | GRE; Ret | NZL; Ret | GER; Ret | ITA; 5 | ESP; 11 | 11th | 10 |

==== WRC-2 results ====
| Year | Entrant | Car | 1 | 2 | 3 | 4 | 5 | 6 | 7 | 8 | 9 | 10 | 11 | 12 | 13 | Pos. | Points |
|---|---|---|---|---|---|---|---|---|---|---|---|---|---|---|---|---|---|
| 2013 | Mentos Ascania Racing | Mini John Cooper Works S2000 | MON | SWE | MEX | POR; Ret | ARG | GRE; 9 | ITA; Ret | FIN; 8 | GER | AUS | FRA; Ret | ESP | GBR; Ret | 33rd | 6 |
| 2014 | Oleksiy Kikireshko | Ford Fiesta R5 | MON | SWE | MEX | POR | ARG | ITA | POL | FIN; Ret | GER | AUS | FRA | ESP | GBR | NC | 0 |
| 2015 | Eurolamp World Rally Team | Mini John Cooper Works S2000 | MON | SWE; 8 | MEX | ARG | POR | ITA | POL | FIN | GER | AUS | FRA | ESP | GBR | 38th | 4 |
