= Valeriy Gorban =

Ukrainian rally driver (born 1973)

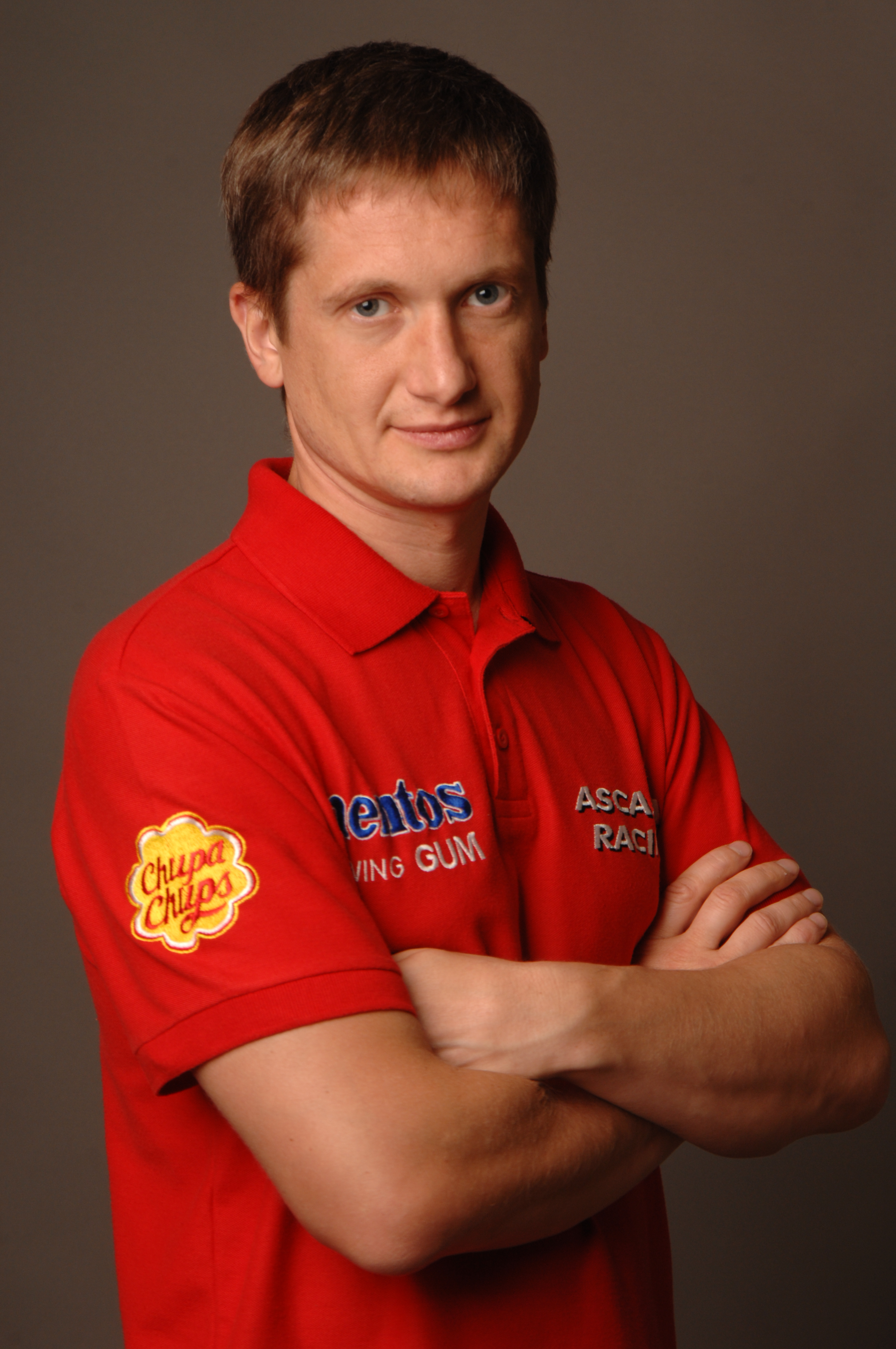

Personal information
- Nationality: (Ukraine) Ukrainian
- Born: February 6, 1973 (age 53); Kyiv, Ukrainian SSR, Soviet Union

World Rally Championship record
- Years active: 2009, 2011–2017
- Co-driver: (Ukraine) Evgeniy Leonov (Estonia) Sergey Larens (Ukraine) Vadim Chernega (Ukraine) Andriy Nikolaev (Ukraine) Volodymyr Korsia
- Teams: Mentos Ascania Racing; Eurolamp World Rally Team
- Rallies: 50
- Championships: 0
- Rally wins: 0
- Podiums: 0
- Stage wins: 0
- Total points: 1
- First rally: 2009 Rally Poland
- Last rally: 2017 Rally Catalunya

Valeriy Ivanovych Gorban (Ukrainian: Валерій Іванович Горбань, born February 6, 1973) is a Ukrainian rally driver.

From 2002 to 2020, Gorban took part in 193 national and international competitions.

== 2002-2007: MacCoffee Rally Team ==
Gorban began his rally career in 2002, at the age of 29. He was already head of the racing team MacCoffee Rally Team. During the 2002 season in the Ukrainian Rally Championship, team colors were defended by Alexander Salyuk, Sr. and Alexander Salyuk, Jr.; Gorban joined them only at the final stage of the championship in Kherson.

In 2003, Gorban and his navigator Evgeny Leonov as part of the MacCoffee Rally Team conducted the full Ukrainian championship in rallying the Lada 2112 Super 1600 car. Having won five races out of six, the crew became the champion in the A9 class, and MacCoffee sees victory in the team classification.

In the next season, and due to a change in the rules of the championship, team-mates Alexander Salyuk Jr. and Gorban drive against each other as rivals, however still performing in the same cars. In 2004, Salyuk becomes champion of Ukraine in the A7 class, and in 2005, Gorban. A year later, both drivers are synchronously transplanted to a higher-class vehicle: the all-wheel drive Mitsubishi Lancer Evolution.

The 2006 season demonstrates that Gorban can rightly be counted among the leaders of the Ukrainian rally. Podiums on the rally "Chumatsky Shlyakh" and "Golden Autumn of the Carpathians" saw the driver come sixth place in the overall standings of the championship at the end of the season. The result could have been higher, but the result of Gorban on the Trembit rally was canceled due to the mismatch of his car homologation card.

The next season sees Gorban taking a more experimental approach to his – in more than half of the races he used a Subaru Impreza, which was an unusual car for him, built by the Kyiv racer and engineer Andriy Alexandrov. Despite this irregularity, Gorban still finisheed on the podium in the rally "Chumatsky Shlyakh", "Trembita" and "Galicia". At the end of the season, he is in the top five of the fastest participants in the championship of Ukraine. However, after the death of Alexandrov at the Bulgarian rally "Sliven", Gorban returns to the Mitsubishi Lancer.

== 2008-2009-2013: Prime Rally Team Mentos Ascania Racing ==
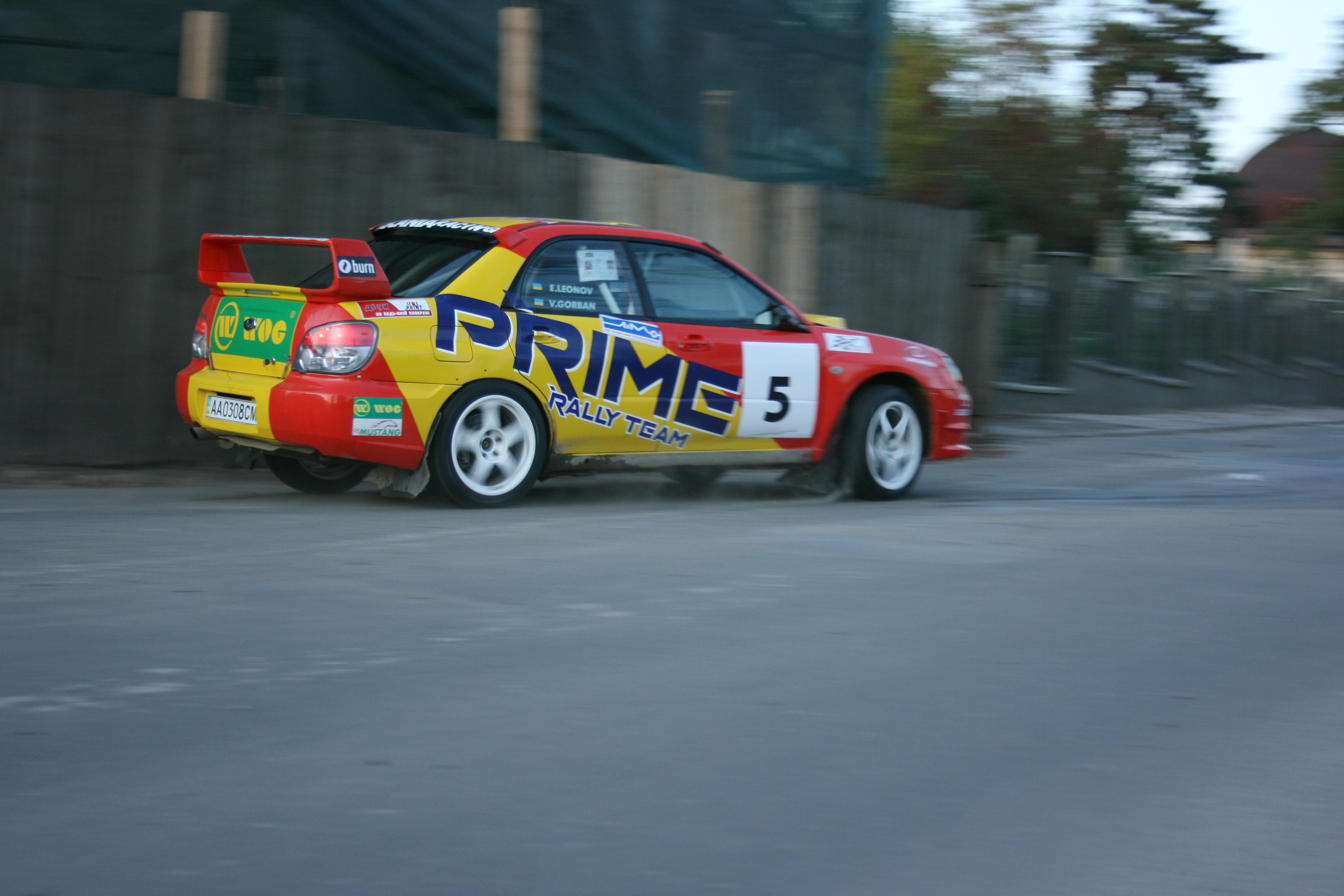

The 2008 season begins for Gorban and his team with a change of image – the side of the cars is decorated with the logo of the new title sponsor, the vodka brand Prime. This season becomes the worst in Gorban's career – he only finishes twice out of all the races, and never once takes the podium. This results in the team falling to the third place in the standings. As a result, cooperation with Prime ceases, and in the new season, a new sponsor was required.

In 2009, the name of the Gorban team appears for the first time the name of its main company – Ascania. The season of 2009 did not become a breakthrough, although he brought the pilot the first podium in the Bukovina rally in two years, and the team headed by him returned to the top of the standings. But 2010 turned out to be much more successful.

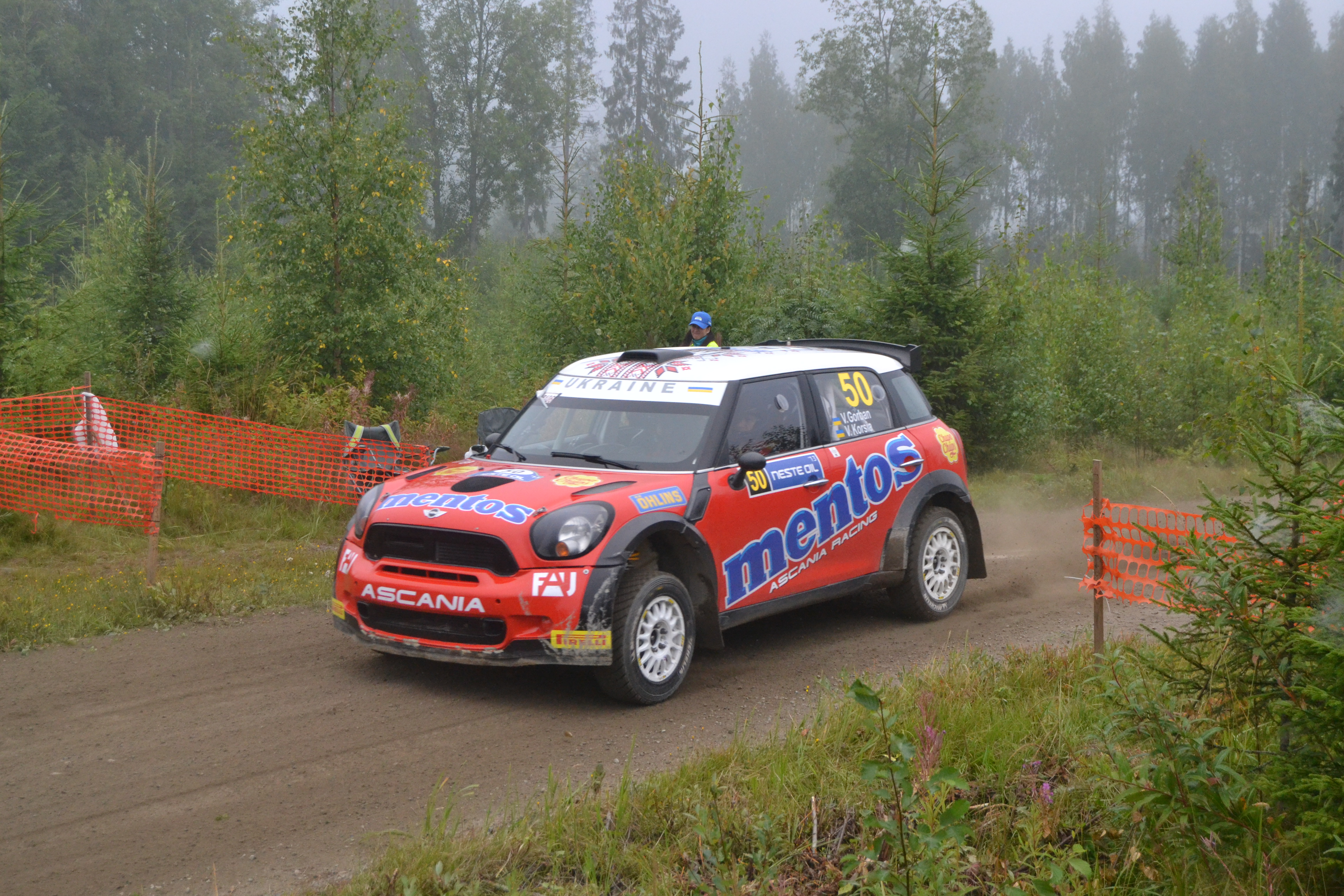
Gorban at 2013 Rally Finland

The 2013 season was a brilliant revenge against Gorban in the championship fight. At the beginning of the season, both favorites are transplanted to higher-class cars: Gorban on the Mini Cooper RRC, and Salyuk on the Ford Fiesta R5. Valery wins "Chumatsky Shlyakh" and "Galicia", while Alexander wins in the "Alexandrov Rally" and the rally "Yalta". Everything is decided on the last race, the Trembit rally – and here Salyuk, unable to withstand the tension, gets off the track at the first stage, and Gorban becomes the absolute champion of Ukraine for the second time in his career.

== 2014 — :Eurolamp World Rally Team ==
In 2014, Gorban's team underwent a rebranding that included new colors and a new title sponsor. The Mini Cooper RRC was repainted in bright green with a red stripe. Following the sponsorship, the Eurolamp brand became associated with the team's motorsport activities and was subsequently promoted in its consumer products.

Early triumphs have been achieved already during the first year of rallying under new colors in the WRC-2 standings. The second season of Mini Cooper RRC showed stability: 100% finish in seven races, two victories on special stages, and tenth place got in WRC-2 standings.

The team’s debut season was even more impressive. Eurolamp WRT got 87 points and third place following the results of 2014.

Gorban and Vladimir Korsi started 2015 with a podium – their crew took third place in the WRC-2 standings during the Swedish rally. But the next sessions turned into a complete disappointment – there were six starts and only three finishes. At the season's end, Gorban’s 20 credit points allowed him to get 19th place in the final classification of the WRC-2 standings. Five victories on special stages of the WRC-2 standings were the only thing to be proud of.

2016 was marked by new technical regulations and minor vehicle upgrades. And the team had to raise its vehicle status - Mini John Cooper Works RRC turned into Mini John Cooper Works WRC.

The vehicle appeared to be uncompetitive under the RRC specification given the new regulation requirements and compared with R5 class vehicles. But the most important thing was that its developer – Prodrive company – had no idea of how to modify the car to meet new requirements.

For the first time since 2013, Gorban used to participate in a rally on his native land. His Mitsubishi Lancer Evolution 9 started in the Star Fortetsya rally and easily won the victory with a tremendous advantage over the second prize winner. His second start in Ukraine was at the end of the rally season when Valery decided to surprise everyone with Mini John Cooper Works WRC notable by its very colorful painting.

2017 became the year of change. The Estonian Sergei Larens occupied the seat on the right of Gorban, and the newly created team started in the new WRC-Trophy, where the previous-generation RC1 vehicles were allowed to participate.

2018 started with a new program. It was decided to participate in the Latvian and Estonian Rally Championships. Two championships had common first races. The crew of Gorban and Larens became the leader in both of them thanks to their victory at the season start and a prize place got in the next stage. In May, the championships’ paths diverged and the crew confirmed its leading ambitions in the Latvian Talsi rally. The Estonian spring-and-summer season started with Tallinn Rally and Viru Rally. Georg Gross – the three-time champion of Estonia – joined the battle right there. Two-second places and keen struggle allowed the crew to talk about a bright finish to the championship season.

In 2019, it was decided to continue competitions in rally competitions in Latvia and Estonia. The winter part has traditionally started with stages in the east of Latvia. The fight for victory at the Aluxne rally in January went to the last special stages with Oliver Solberg. Unfortunately, the broken wheel did not allow the car to reach its full potential. As a result, the crew ended up with the second place in the overall standings. The next stage in Gulben did not allow to continue the podium series due to the loss of time in one of the turns. In May, due to the cancellation of the Estonian round, the crew was able to start in Ukraine. The restored Rally Fortecya was at a very high level, and the crew of Valery Gorban and Sergei Larens did not know the equal paths of Podillya. Fighting on two fronts continued in stages in Latvia and Estonia. In the summer, two silver awards were awarded in Estonia, but as a result of the year the victorious champagne crew never knew. This time, the results in the two championships, as well as last season, were also the same, but the championship unit changed to three.

== Career in the World Rally Championship ==
For the first time at the World Championship, Gorban started in 2009. The first attempt turned out to be quite successful: the Kyivan took third place in the N4 class at the Polish rally. However, a full program of performances in the world championship was deployed two years later, in 2011, the Mentos Ascania Racing team entered the World Cup 2011 with three crews, the first pilots which were Valeriy Gorban, Alexander Salyuk, Jr., and Alexey Kikireshko. All three participated in the Production WRC and took part in six stages of the series. Gorban began the season with confidence – with fourth place in Sweden and fifth in Portugal, but then the results somewhat deteriorated. Only once, in Australia, Gorban managed to climb again to fifth place. However, at the same time, Gorban became the best representative of the team in this draw of the championship, taking the 8th position in the PWRC standings.

Significantly better for Gorban next season, during which he also took part in six stages of the Production WRC. In the first race in Argentina, the crew of Valeriy Gorban and Andrei Nikolaev climbed to the podium, and a few weeks later in Greece, he managed to win his first victory in the World Cup. During the season, third place was added to this in Italy and two fourth in New Zealand and Spain, which in total allowed the crew to become the first Ukrainian athletes to become bronze medalists of the World Rally Championship.

Starting in 2013, Gorban transplanted to the higher-class equipment, the Mini Cooper RRC car, thus taking part in the classification of the newly formed WRC 2. The significantly increased level of competition plus the necessary period of adaptation to the new car does not allow Gorban to show the same high results in the 2013 season.

2014 was a year of change. A new coloring in the colors Eurolamp brings the prize in the team event third place and in the personal classification tenth.

In 2015, Gorban again enjoys the prize of champagne, the third place in the WRC-2 standings was won in the rally of Sweden.

In 2016, Gorban brought to the launch of the Mini John Cooper Works WRC. At the end of the season, the asset was one point and 25th place in the final classification.

In 2017, Gorban was not pleased with the success in the absolute standings; the best achievement was the 13th place in the rally of Mexico, but the new-old assistant Valeria, Sergei Larens, became an accomplice in four victories in the WRC-Trophy standings.

== Ring races ==
For quite a long period, Gorban has acted in parallel both in rallying and in-ring racing. In the Ukrainian championship, he started only twice, during 2006 – but even so, having won four races (two in each of the stages), he became the vice-champion of Ukraine in the A3 class. However, most of Gorban's round starts took place at the German Nürburgring circuit as part of the German championship for many hours of VLN racing.

Debut in the endurance race fell in 2004. The debut starts for Honda Civic brought two wins in the class.

2005 did not bring catwalks into the class and the next season Gorban moved to the BMW M3 E46. Since 2006, Valeriy's partner has been Stanislav Gryazin for many years. In the three races of the season, an international blow has extracted one bronze and one silver in the class, and the finish in the top twenty has become common.

In 2007 came the first joint victory in its class, a little later and the second three finishes in the first ten of the absolute test showed the level of the crew. 2008 started with the next update of equipment, this time at the disposal of Gorban and Stanislav Porsche 996 RSR, which allowed to fight for victories on the North loop. In nine races of the season, the crew finished six times in the top-ten, once the crew was a step from the podium of the absolute standings, fourth place remained the highest achievement of Valery in the absolute standings of the VLN races.

In 2008, Gorban took part in the cult race ADAC Zurich 24h Rennen, the international crew saw the finish in tenth place in the absolute standings.

In 2009, joint performances could not be continued because of the refusal of the German Consulate to extend the visa to Stanislav Gryazin, Valeriy Gorban only went on a start in the crew with Olexii Kikireshko and Ralph Wagner, but second in the class. remained the only and for today the last finish of Kyiv in the endurance race.

== Social activity ==
Gorban was a member of the Automobile Federation of Ukraine (FAU), for many years joining the various governing structures of this organization. So, in 2005, Gorban joined the FAU Presidium, and, beginning in 2008, focused on the development of rally discipline, joining the FAU Rally Committee, and in 2012 heading it.

Gorban's chairmanship saw an increase in Ukrainian activity in rallying. Ukraine hosted several stages of the European Rally Cup and held joint competitions with the Russian and Belarusian automobile federations. In 2012, the chairman of the FIA rally committee Jonathan Ashman visited the country, at a meeting with which the prospects of holding the World Rally Championship stage in the Carpathians were discussed.

At the initiatives and with the support of Gorban, such innovations as the broadcasting of the results of the competition online, the broadcasting of a specialized rally radio, the installation of participants' cars for safety of GPS trackers, the ban on more than two uses of the same ones the same special stages and much more. Largely thanks to these innovations, Ukraine has risen in the ranks of the World Countries Ranking from 27th place in 2011 to 13th in 2012, and then to the 5th in 2013.

Gorban resigned from all posts in the automobile federation in early 2014.

== WRC results ==
=== WRC results ===
Year	Entrant	Car	1	2	3	4	5	6	7	8	9	10	11	12	13	14	WDC	Points
2009	Valeriy Gorban	Mitsubishi Lancer Evo IX	IRL	NOR	CYP	POR	ARG	ITA	GRE	POL; 14	FIN	AUS	ESP	GBR			NC	0
2011	Mentos Ascania Racing	Mitsubishi Lancer Evo IX	SWE; 22	MEX	POR; 19	JOR	ITA	ARG	GRE	FIN; 40	GER	AUS; 12	FRA	ESP; 32	GBR; 34		NC	0
2012	Mentos Ascania Racing	Mitsubishi Lancer Evo IX	MON	SWE	MEX	POR	ARG; 14	GRE; 14	NZL; 20	FIN	GER; 34	GBR	FRA	ITA; 16	ESP; 27		NC	0
2013	Valeriy Gorban	Mitsubishi Lancer Evo IX	MON	SWE; Ret	MEX												NC	0
2013	Mentos Ascania Racing	Mini John Cooper Works S2000				POR; Ret	ARG	GRE; 18	ITA; Ret	FIN; 18	GER	AUS	FRA; Ret	ESP	GBR; 15		NC	0
2014	Eurolamp World Rally Team	Mini John Cooper Works S2000	MON	SWE; 21	MEX	POR; 18	ARG	ITA; 31	POL; 15	FIN; 31	GER	AUS	FRA	ESP; 23	GBR; 19		NC	0
2015	Eurolamp World Rally Team	Mini John Cooper Works S2000	MON	SWE; 15	MEX; Ret	ARG	POR; 18	ITA; 18	POL; Ret	FIN; Ret	GER	AUS	FRA	ESP	GBR; 41		NC	0
2016	Eurolamp World Rally Team	Mini John Cooper Works WRC	MON	SWE; 24	MEX; 10	ARG; Ret	POR; Ret	ITA; 28	POL; 27	FIN; 21	GER	CHN; C	FRA	ESP; 15	GBR; 37	AUS	25th	1
2017	Eurolamp World Rally Team	Mini John Cooper Works WRC	MON	SWE; 20	MEX; 13	FRA	ARG; Ret	POR; Ret	ITA	POL; 16	FIN; Ret	GER	ESP; 24	GBR	AUS		NC	0

=== PWRC results ===
Year	Entrant	Car	1	2	3	4	5	6	7	8	PWRC	Points
2011	Mentos Ascania Racing	Mitsubishi Lancer Evo IX	SWE; 4	POR; 5	ARG	FIN; 6	AUS; 5	ESP; 7	GBR; 9		7th	46
2012	Mentos Ascania Racing	Mitsubishi Lancer Evo IX	MON	MEX	ARG; 3	GRE; 1	NZL; 4	GER; 7	ITA; 3	ESP; 4	3rd	85

=== WRC-2 results ===
Year	Entrant	Car	1	2	3	4	5	6	7	8	9	10	11	12	13	Pos.	Points
2013	Mentos Ascania Racing	Mini John Cooper Works S2000	MON	SWE	MEX	POR; Ret	ARG	GRE; 8	ITA; Ret	FIN; 9	GER	AUS	FRA; Ret	ESP	GBR; 7	28th	12
2014	Eurolamp World Rally Team	Mini John Cooper Works S2000	MON	SWE; 7	MEX	POR; 8	ARG	ITA; 15	POL; 4	FIN; 7	GER	AUS	FRA	ESP; 6	GBR; 7	10th	42
2015	Eurolamp World Rally Team	Mini John Cooper Works S2000	MON	SWE; 3	MEX; Ret	ARG	POR; 8	ITA; 10	POL; Ret	FIN; Ret	GER	AUS	FRA	ESP	GBR; 15	18th	20

=== WRC Trophy results ===
Year	Entrant	Car	1	2	3	4	5	6	7	8	9	10	11	12	13	Pos.	Points
2017	Eurolamp World Rally Team	Mini John Cooper Works WRC	MON	SWE; 1	MEX; 1	FRA	ARG; Ret	POR; Ret	ITA	POL; 1	FIN; Ret	GER	ESP; 1	GBR	AUS	2nd	100
