= 2017 Rally de Portugal =

Motor rally competition

2017 Rally de Portugal 51° Vodafone Rally de Portugal 2017
Round 6 of the 2017 World Rally Championship
← Previous event	Next event →
- Host country: Portugal
- Rally base: (Portugal) Matosinhos
- Dates run: 18 – 21 May 2017
- Stages: 19 (349.17 km; 216.96 miles)
- Stage surface: Gravel

Statistics
- Crews: 64 at start, 41 at finish

Overall results
- Overall winner: (France) Sébastien Ogier (France) Julien Ingrassia (United Kingdom) M-Sport World Rally Team

The 2017 Rally de Portugal was the sixth round of the 2017 World Rally Championship and the 51st running of the Rally de Portugal.

Sébastien Ogier and Julien Ingrassia were the rally winners. Their team, M-Sport Ford WRT, were the manufacturers' winners.

== Entry list ==
Notable entrants
No.	Entrant	Class	Driver	Co-driver	Car	Tyre
1	(United Kingdom) M-Sport World Rally Team	WRC	(France) Sébastien Ogier	(France) Julien Ingrassia	Ford Fiesta WRC	M
2	(United Kingdom) M-Sport World Rally Team	WRC	(Estonia) Ott Tänak	(Estonia) Martin Järveoja	Ford Fiesta WRC	M
3	(United Kingdom) M-Sport World Rally Team	WRC	(United Kingdom) Elfyn Evans	(United Kingdom) Daniel Barritt	Ford Fiesta WRC	D
4	(South Korea) Hyundai Motorsport	WRC	(New Zealand) Hayden Paddon	(United Kingdom) Sebastian Marshall	Hyundai i20 Coupe WRC	M
5	(South Korea) Hyundai Motorsport	WRC	(Belgium) Thierry Neuville	(Belgium) Nicolas Gilsoul	Hyundai i20 Coupe WRC	M
6	(South Korea) Hyundai Motorsport	WRC	(Spain) Dani Sordo	(Spain) Marc Martí	Hyundai i20 Coupe WRC	M
7	(France) Citroën Total Abu Dhabi WRT	WRC	(United Kingdom) Kris Meeke	(Republic of Ireland) Paul Nagle	Citroën C3 WRC	M
8	(France) Citroën Total Abu Dhabi WRT	WRC	(Republic of Ireland) Craig Breen	(United Kingdom) Scott Martin	Citroën C3 WRC	M
9	(France) Citroën Total Abu Dhabi WRT	WRC	(France) Stéphane Lefebvre	(France) Gabin Moreau	Citroën C3 WRC	M
10	(Japan) Toyota Gazoo Racing WRT	WRC	(Finland) Jari-Matti Latvala	(Finland) Miikka Anttila	Toyota Yaris WRC	M
11	(Japan) Toyota Gazoo Racing WRT	WRC	(Finland) Juho Hänninen	(Finland) Kaj Lindström	Toyota Yaris WRC	M
12	(Japan) Toyota Gazoo Racing WRT	WRC	(Finland) Esapekka Lappi	(Finland) Janne Ferm	Toyota Yaris WRC	M
14	(United Kingdom) M-Sport World Rally Team	WRC	(Norway) Mads Østberg	(Norway) Ola Fløene	Ford Fiesta WRC	D
15	(France) Citroën Total Abu Dhabi WRT	WRC	(United Arab Emirates) Khalid Al-Qassimi	(United Kingdom) Chris Patterson	Citroën C3 WRC	M
21	(Czech Republic) OneBet Jipocar World Rally Team	WRC	(Czech Republic) Martin Prokop	(Czech Republic) Jan Tománek	Ford Fiesta RS WRC	D
22	(Ukraine) Eurolamp World Rally Team	WRC	(Ukraine) Valeriy Gorban	(Estonia) Sergei Larens	Mini John Cooper Works WRC	M
23	(France) Jean-Michel Raoux	WRC	(France) Jean-Michel Raoux	(France) Thomas Escartefigue	Citroën DS3 WRC	D

Key
Icon	Class
WRC	WRC entries eligible to score manufacturer points
WRC	Major entry ineligible to score manufacturer points
WRC	Registered to score points in WRC Trophy
WRC-2	Registered to take part in WRC-2 championship
WRC-3	Registered to take part in WRC-3 championship

== Classification ==
=== Event standings ===
Pos.	No.	Driver	Co-driver	Team	Car	Class	Time	Difference	Points
1	1	(France) Sébastien Ogier	(France) Julien Ingrassia	(United Kingdom) M-Sport World Rally Team	Ford Fiesta WRC	WRC	3:42:55.7	0.0	26
2	5	(Belgium) Thierry Neuville	(Belgium) Nicolas Gilsoul	(South Korea) Hyundai Motorsport	Hyundai i20 Coupe WRC	WRC	3:43:11.3	+15.6	22
3	6	(Spain) Dani Sordo	(Spain) Marc Martí	(South Korea) Hyundai Motorsport	Hyundai i20 Coupe WRC	WRC	3:43:57.4	+1:01.7	15
4	2	(Estonia) Ott Tänak	(Estonia) Martin Järveoja	(United Kingdom) M-Sport World Rally Team	Ford Fiesta WRC	WRC	3:44:25.9	+1:30.2	17
5	8	(Republic of Ireland) Craig Breen	(United Kingdom) Scott Martin	(France) Citroën Total Abu Dhabi WRT	Citroën C3 WRC	WRC	3:44:53.1	+1:57.4	10
6	3	(United Kingdom) Elfyn Evans	(United Kingdom) Daniel Barritt	(United Kingdom) M-Sport World Rally Team	Ford Fiesta WRC	WRC	3:46:06.3	+3:10.6	11
7	11	(Finland) Juho Hänninen	(Finland) Kaj Lindström	(Japan) Toyota Gazoo Racing WRT	Toyota Yaris WRC	WRC	3:46:44.6	+3:48.9	6
8	14	(Norway) Mads Østberg	(Norway) Ola Fløene	(United Kingdom) M-Sport World Rally Team	Ford Fiesta WRC	WRC	3:48:25.4	+5:29.7	4
9	10	(Finland) Jari-Matti Latvala	(Finland) Miikka Anttila	(Japan) Toyota Gazoo Racing WRT	Toyota Yaris WRC	WRC	3:48:39.3	+5:43.6	2
10	12	(Finland) Esapekka Lappi	(Finland) Janne Ferm	(Japan) Toyota Gazoo Racing WRT	Toyota Yaris WRC	WRC	3:51:09.0	+8:13.3	3

=== Special stages ===
Day	Stage	Name	Length	Winner	Car	Time	Rally Leader
Leg 1 (18-19 May)	SS1	SSS Lousada	3.36 km	(Belgium) Thierry Neuville (Norway) Mads Østberg	Hyundai i20 Coupe WRC; Ford Fiesta WRC	2:36.6	(Belgium) Thierry Neuville (Norway) Mads Østberg
Leg 1 (18-19 May)	SS2	Viana do Castelo 1	26.70 km	(New Zealand) Hayden Paddon	Hyundai i20 Coupe WRC	15:44.3	(New Zealand) Hayden Paddon
Leg 1 (18-19 May)	SS3	Caminha 1	18.10 km	(Finland) Jari-Matti Latvala	Toyota Yaris WRC	10:25.2	(Finland) Jari-Matti Latvala
Leg 1 (18-19 May)	SS4	Ponte de Lima 1	27.46 km	(Estonia) Ott Tänak (United Kingdom) Kris Meeke (Republic of Ireland) Craig Breen	Ford Fiesta WRC; Citroën C3 WRC; Citroën C3 WRC	19:14.0	(Finland) Jari-Matti Latvala
Leg 1 (18-19 May)	SS5	Viana do Castelo 2	26.70 km	(New Zealand) Hayden Paddon	Hyundai i20 Coupe WRC	15:35.6	(United Kingdom) Kris Meeke
Leg 1 (18-19 May)	SS6	Caminha 2	18.10 km	(Belgium) Thierry Neuville	Hyundai i20 Coupe WRC	10:25.0	(Estonia) Ott Tänak
Leg 1 (18-19 May)	SS7	Ponte de Lima 2	27.46 km	(Spain) Dani Sordo	Hyundai i20 Coupe WRC	19:20.2	(Estonia) Ott Tänak
Leg 1 (18-19 May)	SS8	Braga Street Stage 1	1.90 km	(France) Sébastien Ogier	Ford Fiesta WRC	1:48.8	(Estonia) Ott Tänak
Leg 1 (18-19 May)	SS9	Braga Street Stage 2	1.90 km	(Norway) Mads Østberg	Ford Fiesta WRC	1:46.5	(Estonia) Ott Tänak
Leg 2 (20 May)	SS10	Vieira do Minho 1	17.43 km	(France) Sébastien Ogier	Ford Fiesta WRC	10:46.4	(Estonia) Ott Tänak
Leg 2 (20 May)	SS11	Cabeceiras de Basto 1	22.30 km	(Estonia) Ott Tänak	Ford Fiesta WRC	13:32.6	(Estonia) Ott Tänak
Leg 2 (20 May)	SS12	Amarante 1	37.55 km	(France) Sébastien Ogier	Ford Fiesta WRC	24:41.5	(France) Sébastien Ogier
Leg 2 (20 May)	SS13	Vieira do Minho 2	17.43 km	(Belgium) Thierry Neuville	Hyundai i20 Coupe WRC	10:43.4	(France) Sébastien Ogier
Leg 2 (20 May)	SS14	Cabeceiras de Basto 2	22.30 km	(France) Sébastien Ogier	Ford Fiesta WRC	13:31.0	(France) Sébastien Ogier
Leg 2 (20 May)	SS15	Amarante 2	37.55 km	(Belgium) Thierry Neuville	Hyundai i20 Coupe WRC	24:33.8	(France) Sébastien Ogier
Leg 3 (21 May)	SS16	Fafe 1	11.18 km	(New Zealand) Hayden Paddon	Hyundai i20 Coupe WRC	6:39.7	(France) Sébastien Ogier
Leg 3 (21 May)	SS17	Luílhas	11.91 km	(France) Sébastien Ogier	Ford Fiesta WRC	8:09.7	(France) Sébastien Ogier
Leg 3 (21 May)	SS18	Montim	8.66 km	(New Zealand) Hayden Paddon	Hyundai i20 Coupe WRC	5:51.7	(France) Sébastien Ogier
Leg 3 (21 May)	SS19	Fafe 2 [Power Stage]	11.18 km	(Estonia) Ott Tänak	Ford Fiesta WRC	6:38.3	(France) Sébastien Ogier

=== Power Stage ===
The Power Stage was a 11.18 km (6.9 mi) stage at the end of the rally.

Pos.	Driver	Co-driver	Car	Time	Diff.	Pts.
1	(Estonia) Ott Tänak	(Estonia) Martin Järveoja	Ford Fiesta WRC	6:38.3		5
2	(Belgium) Thierry Neuville	(Belgium) Nicolas Gilsoul	Hyundai i20 Coupe WRC	6:38.7	+0.4	4
3	(United Kingdom) Elfyn Evans	(United Kingdom) Daniel Barritt	Ford Fiesta WRC	6:39.8	+1.5	3
4	(Finland) Esapekka Lappi	(Finland) Janne Ferm	Toyota Yaris WRC	6:40.0	+1.7	2
5	(France) Sébastien Ogier	(France) Julien Ingrassia	Ford Fiesta WRC	6:40.6	+2.3	1

=== Championship standings after the rally ===
Drivers' Championship standings

	Pos.	Driver	Points
	1	(France) Sébastien Ogier	128
1	2	(Belgium) Thierry Neuville	106
1	3	(Finland) Jari-Matti Latvala	88
	4	(Estonia) Ott Tänak	83
	5	(Spain) Dani Sordo	66

Manufacturers' Championship standings

Pos.	Manufacturer	Points
1	(United Kingdom) M-Sport World Rally Team	199
2	(South Korea) Hyundai Motorsport	173
3	(Japan) Toyota Gazoo Racing WRT	113
4	(France) Citroën Total Abu Dhabi WRT	85
