= 2017 Rally Finland =

Motor rally competition

2017 Rally Finland 67th Neste Rally Finland 2017
Round 9 of the 2017 World Rally Championship
← Previous event	Next event →
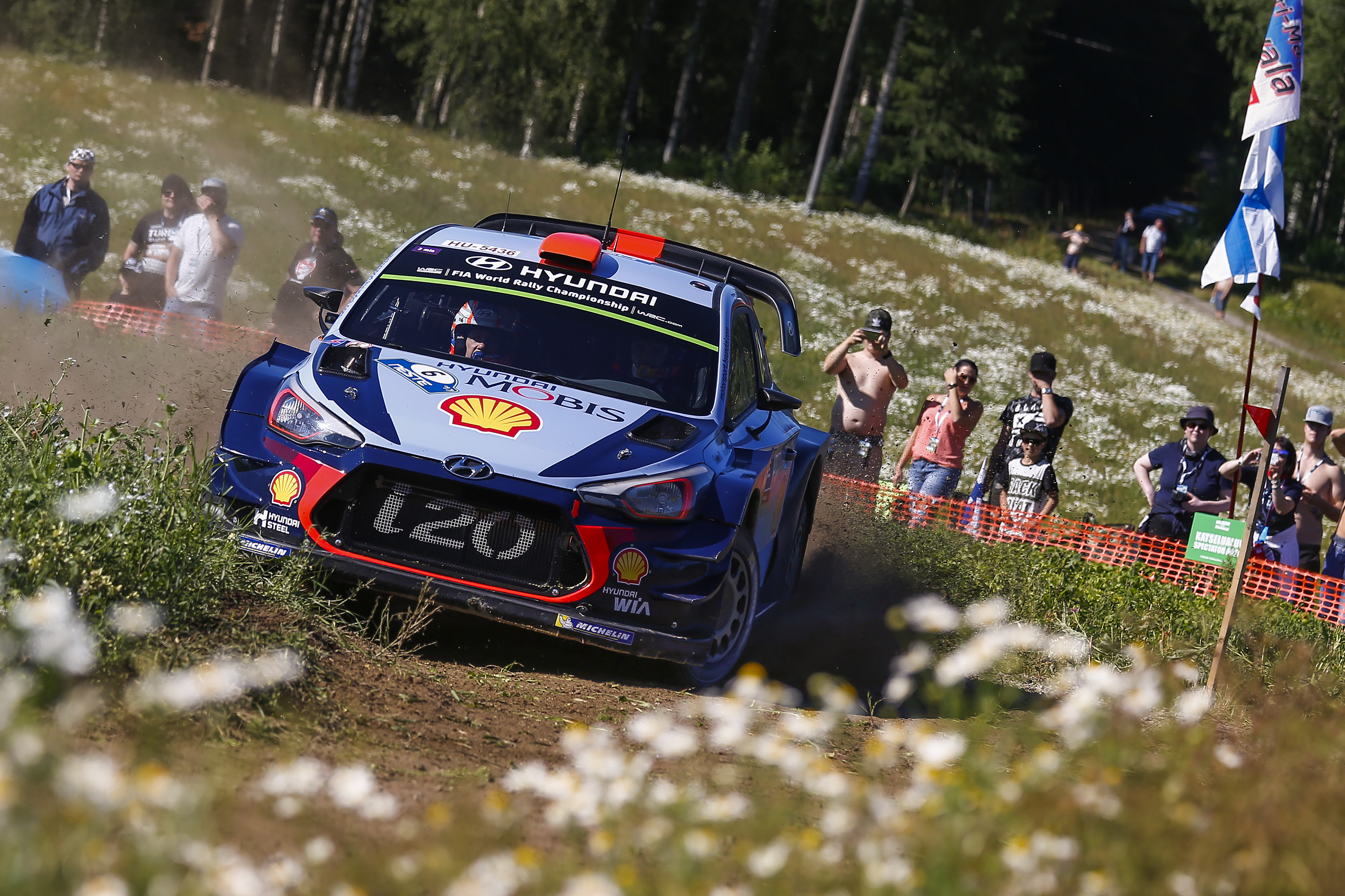
- Dani Sordo and Marc Martí during the rally.
- Host country: Finland
- Rally base: (Finland) Jyväskylä
- Dates run: 27 July – 30 July 2017
- Stages: 25 (314.20 km; 195.23 miles)
- Stage surface: Gravel

Statistics
- Crews: 61 at start, 42 at finish

Overall results
- Overall winner: (Finland) Esapekka Lappi (Finland) Janne Ferm (Japan) Toyota Gazoo Racing WRT

The 2017 Rally Finland was the ninth round of the 2017 World Rally Championship and was the 67th running of the Rally Finland. Esapekka Lappi and Janne Ferm won the rally, their first win in the WRC.

Jari Huttunen won the WRC-2 category, his first in the series.

== Entry list ==
Notable entrants
No.	Entrant	Class	Driver	Co-driver	Car	Tyre
1	(United Kingdom) M-Sport World Rally Team	WRC	(France) Sébastien Ogier	(France) Julien Ingrassia	Ford Fiesta WRC	MI
2	(United Kingdom) M-Sport World Rally Team	WRC	(Estonia) Ott Tänak	(Estonia) Martin Järveoja	Ford Fiesta WRC	MI
3	(United Kingdom) M-Sport World Rally Team	WRC	(United Kingdom) Elfyn Evans	(United Kingdom) Daniel Barritt	Ford Fiesta WRC	DM
4	(South Korea) Hyundai Motorsport	WRC	(New Zealand) Hayden Paddon	(United Kingdom) Sebastian Marshall	Hyundai i20 Coupe WRC	MI
5	(South Korea) Hyundai Motorsport	WRC	(Belgium) Thierry Neuville	(Belgium) Nicolas Gilsoul	Hyundai i20 Coupe WRC	MI
6	(South Korea) Hyundai Motorsport	WRC	(Spain) Dani Sordo	(Spain) Marc Martí	Hyundai i20 Coupe WRC	MI
7	(France) Citroën Total Abu Dhabi WRT	WRC	(United Kingdom) Kris Meeke	(Republic of Ireland) Paul Nagle	Citroën C3 WRC	MI
8	(France) Citroën Total Abu Dhabi WRT	WRC	(United Arab Emirates) Khalid Al Qassimi	(United Kingdom) Chris Patterson	Citroën C3 WRC	MI
9	(France) Citroën Total Abu Dhabi WRT	WRC	(Republic of Ireland) Craig Breen	(United Kingdom) Scott Martin	Citroën C3 WRC	MI
10	(Japan) Toyota Gazoo Racing WRT	WRC	(Finland) Jari-Matti Latvala	(Finland) Miikka Anttila	Toyota Yaris WRC	MI
11	(Japan) Toyota Gazoo Racing WRT	WRC	(Finland) Juho Hänninen	(Finland) Kaj Lindström	Toyota Yaris WRC	MI
12	(Japan) Toyota Gazoo Racing WRT	WRC	(Finland) Esapekka Lappi	(Finland) Janne Ferm	Toyota Yaris WRC	MI
14	(United Kingdom) M-Sport World Rally Team	WRC	(Norway) Mads Østberg	(Norway) Torstein Eriksen	Ford Fiesta WRC	MI
15	(United Kingdom) M-Sport World Rally Team	WRC	(Finland) Teemu Suninen	(Finland) Mikko Markkula	Ford Fiesta WRC	MI
21	(Ukraine) Eurolamp World Rally Team	WRC	(Ukraine) Valeriy Gorban	(Estonia) Sergei Larens	Mini John Cooper Works WRC	MI

Key
Icon	Class
WRC	WRC entries eligible to score manufacturer points
WRC	Major entry ineligible to score manufacturer points
WRC	Registered to score points in WRC Trophy
WRC-2	Registered to take part in WRC-2 championship
WRC-3	Registered to take part in WRC-3 championship
JWRC	Registered to take part in Junior World Rally championship

== Classification ==
=== Event standings ===
Pos.	No.	Driver	Co-driver	Team	Car	Class	Time	Difference	Points
Overall classification
1	12	(Finland) Esapekka Lappi	(Finland) Janne Ferm	(Japan) Toyota Gazoo Racing WRT	Toyota Yaris WRC	WRC	2:29:26.9	0.0	25
2	3	(United Kingdom) Elfyn Evans	(United Kingdom) Daniel Barritt	(United Kingdom) M-Sport World Rally Team	Ford Fiesta WRC	WRC	2:30:02.9	+36.0	22
3	11	(Finland) Juho Hänninen	(Finland) Kaj Lindström	(Japan) Toyota Gazoo Racing WRT	Toyota Yaris WRC	WRC	2:30:03.2	+36.3	16
4	15	(Finland) Teemu Suninen	(Finland) Mikko Markkula	(United Kingdom) M-Sport World Rally Team	Ford Fiesta WRC	WRC	2:30:28.4	+1:01.5	12
5	9	(Republic of Ireland) Craig Breen	(United Kingdom) Scott Martin	(France) Citroën Total Abu Dhabi WRT	Citroën C3 WRC	WRC	2:30:49.5	+1:22.6	10
6	5	(Belgium) Thierry Neuville	(Belgium) Nicolas Gilsoul	(South Korea) Hyundai Motorsport	Hyundai i20 Coupe WRC	WRC	2:31:00.0	+1:33.1	11
7	2	(Estonia) Ott Tänak	(Estonia) Martin Järveoja	(United Kingdom) M-Sport World Rally Team	Ford Fiesta WRC	WRC	2:31:20.5	+1:53.6	11
8	7	(United Kingdom) Kris Meeke	(Republic of Ireland) Paul Nagle	(France) Citroën Total Abu Dhabi WRT	Citroën C3 WRC	WRC	2:32:39.5	+3:12.6	4
9	6	(Spain) Dani Sordo	(Spain) Marc Martí	(South Korea) Hyundai Motorsport	Hyundai i20 Coupe WRC	WRC	2:33:38.4	+4:11.5	2
10	14	(Norway) Mads Østberg	(Norway) Torstein Eriksen	(United Kingdom) M-Sport World Rally Team	Ford Fiesta WRC	WRC	2:33:48.1	+4:21.2	1
21	10	(Finland) Jari-Matti Latvala	(Finland) Miikka Anttila	(Japan) Toyota Gazoo Racing WRT	Toyota Yaris WRC	WRC	2:49:42.7	+20:15.8	2
WRC-2 standings
1 (11.)	40	(Finland) Jari Huttunen	(Finland) Antti Linnaketo	(Finland) Printsport	Škoda Fabia R5	WRC-2	2:39:30.9		25
2 (14.)	36	(France) Quentin Gilbert	(Belgium) Renaud Jamoul	(France) Quentin Gilbert	Škoda Fabia R5	WRC-2	2:41:48.7	+2:17.8	18
3 (15.)	42	(United Kingdom) Tom Cave	(United Kingdom) James Morgan	(Norway) Adapta	Hyundai i20 R5	WRC-2	2:43:13.9	+3:43.0	15

=== Special stages ===
Day	Stage	Name	Length	Winner	Car	Time	Rally Leader
Leg 1	SS1	Harju 1	2.31 km	(Estonia) Ott Tänak	Ford Fiesta WRC	1:44.1	(Estonia) Ott Tänak
Leg 1	SS2	Halinen 1	7.65 km	(Finland) Teemu Suninen	Ford Fiesta WRC	3:39.7	(Estonia) Ott Tänak
Leg 1	SS3	Urria 1	12.75 km	(Finland) Jari-Matti Latvala	Toyota Yaris WRC	5:56.4	(Estonia) Ott Tänak
Leg 1	SS4	Jukojärvi 1	21.31 km	(Finland) Esapekka Lappi	Toyota Yaris WRC	10:06.3	(Finland) Jari-Matti Latvala
Leg 1	SS5	Halinen 2	7.65 km	(Finland) Esapekka Lappi	Toyota Yaris WRC	3:36.5	(Finland) Jari-Matti Latvala
Leg 1	SS6	Urria 2	12.75 km	(Finland) Esapekka Lappi	Toyota Yaris WRC	5:49.7	(Finland) Jari-Matti Latvala
Leg 1	SS7	Jukojärvi 2	21.31 km	(Finland) Esapekka Lappi	Toyota Yaris WRC	9:57.2	(Finland) Jari-Matti Latvala
Leg 1	SS8	Äänekoski - Valtra 1	7.39 km	(Finland) Teemu Suninen	Ford Fiesta WRC	3:27.4	(Finland) Jari-Matti Latvala
Leg 1	SS9	Laukaa 1	11.76 km	(Finland) Esapekka Lappi	Toyota Yaris WRC	5:51.0	(Finland) Jari-Matti Latvala
Leg 1	SS10	Lankamaa	21.68 km	(Finland) Esapekka Lappi	Toyota Yaris WRC	10:21.4	(Finland) Esapekka Lappi
Leg 1	SS11	Äänekoski - Valtra 2	7.39 km	(Finland) Esapekka Lappi	Toyota Yaris WRC	3:23.4	(Finland) Esapekka Lappi
Leg 1	SS12	Laukaa 2	11.76 km	(Finland) Esapekka Lappi	Toyota Yaris WRC	5:44.9	(Finland) Esapekka Lappi
Leg 1	SS13	Harju 2	2.31 km	(Belgium) Thierry Neuville	Hyundai i20 Coupe WRC	1:46.9	(Finland) Esapekka Lappi
Leg 2	SS14	Pihlajakoski 1	14.90 km	(Finland) Jari-Matti Latvala	Toyota Yaris WRC	6:53.9	(Finland) Esapekka Lappi
Leg 2	SS15	Päijälä 1	22.68 km	(Finland) Jari-Matti Latvala	Toyota Yaris WRC	10:55.5	(Finland) Jari-Matti Latvala
Leg 2	SS16	Ouninpohja 1	24.38 km	(Finland) Jari-Matti Latvala	Toyota Yaris WRC	10:56.9	(Finland) Jari-Matti Latvala
Leg 2	SS17	Saalahti 1	4.21 km	(Finland) Jari-Matti Latvala	Toyota Yaris WRC	1:58.4	(Finland) Jari-Matti Latvala
Leg 2	SS18	Saalahti 2	4.21 km	(Finland) Jari-Matti Latvala	Toyota Yaris WRC	1:56.4	(Finland) Jari-Matti Latvala
Leg 2	SS19	Ouninpohja 2	24.38 km	(Finland) Esapekka Lappi	Toyota Yaris WRC	10:49.8	(Finland) Esapekka Lappi
Leg 2	SS20	Pihlajakoski 2	14.90 km	(Finland) Teemu Suninen	Ford Fiesta WRC	6:49.0	(Finland) Esapekka Lappi
Leg 2	SS21	Päijälä 2	22.68 km	(United Kingdom) Elfyn Evans	Ford Fiesta WRC	10:42.3	(Finland) Esapekka Lappi
Leg 3	SS22	Lempää 1	6.80 km	(Finland) Jari-Matti Latvala	Toyota Yaris WRC	3:08.4	(Finland) Esapekka Lappi
Leg 3	SS23	Oittila 1	10.12 km	(Finland) Jari-Matti Latvala	Toyota Yaris WRC	4:52.1	(Finland) Esapekka Lappi
Leg 3	SS24	Lempää 2	6.80 km	(Finland) Jari-Matti Latvala (Finland) Juho Hänninen	Toyota Yaris WRC	3:08.3	(Finland) Esapekka Lappi
Leg 3	SS25	Oittila 2 [Power Stage]	10.12 km	(Estonia) Ott Tänak	Ford Fiesta WRC	4:48.6	(Finland) Esapekka Lappi

=== Power Stage ===
The Power Stage was a 10.12 km (6.3 mi) stage at the end of the rally.

Pos.	Driver	Co-driver	Car	Time	Diff.	Pts.
1	(Estonia) Ott Tänak	(Estonia) Martin Järveoja	Ford Fiesta WRC	4:48.6		5
2	(United Kingdom) Elfyn Evans	(United Kingdom) Daniel Barritt	Ford Fiesta WRC	4:50.1	+1.5	4
3	(Belgium) Thierry Neuville	(Belgium) Nicolas Gilsoul	Hyundai i20 Coupe WRC	4:50.6	+2.0	3
4	(Finland) Jari-Matti Latvala	(Finland) Miikka Anttila	Toyota Yaris WRC	4:50.9	+2.3	2
5	(Finland) Juho Hänninen	(Finland) Kaj Lindström	Toyota Yaris WRC	4:51.3	+2.7	1

=== Championship standings after the rally ===
Drivers' Championship standings

	Pos.	Driver	Points
1	1	(Belgium) Thierry Neuville	160
1	2	(France) Sébastien Ogier	160
1	3	(Estonia) Ott Tänak	119
1	4	(Finland) Jari-Matti Latvala	114
	5	(Spain) Dani Sordo	84

Manufacturers' Championship standings

Pos.	Manufacturer	Points
1	(United Kingdom) M-Sport World Rally Team	285
2	(South Korea) Hyundai Motorsport	251
3	(Japan) Toyota Gazoo Racing WRT	193
4	(France) Citroën Total Abu Dhabi WRT	135
