= MacCoffee =

Singaporean brand of instant coffee

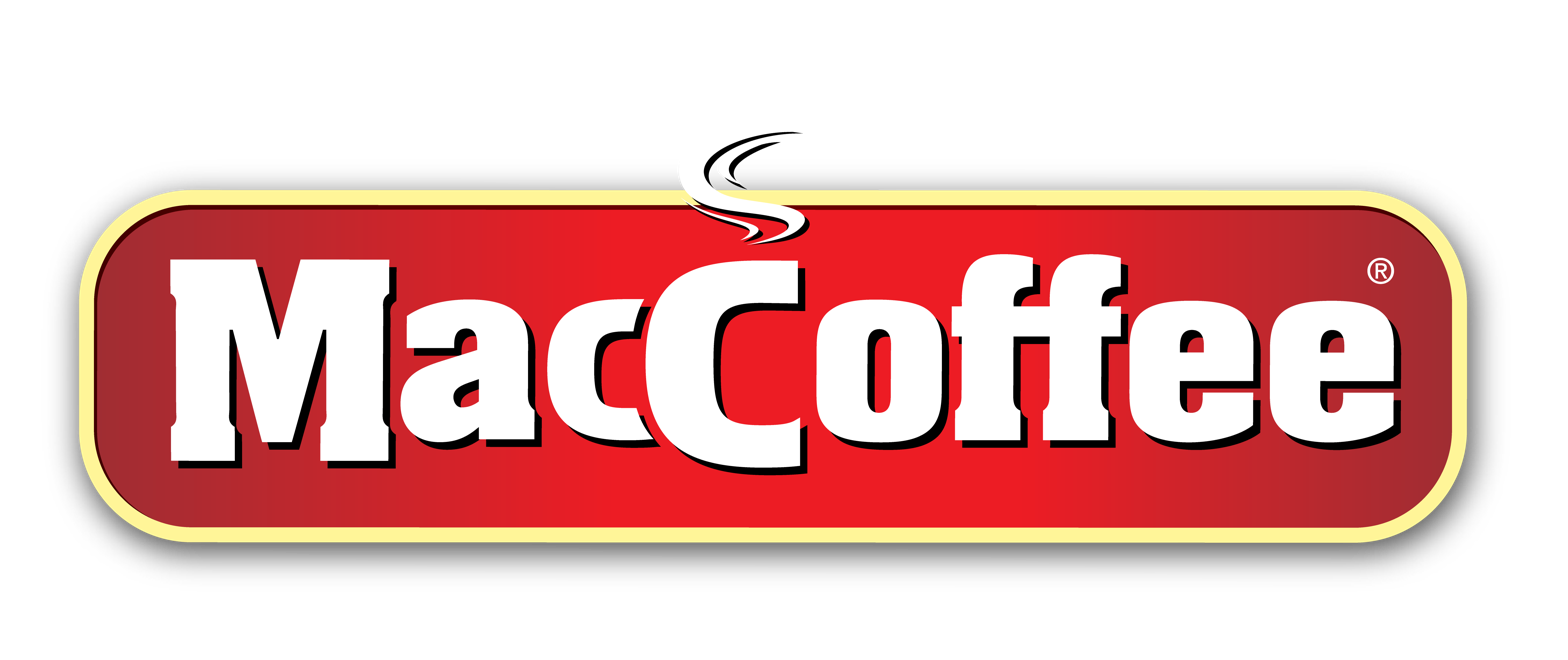
- Product type: Instant coffee
- Produced by: Food Empire
- Country: Singapore
- Introduced: 1994
- Markets: Singapore; worldwide

MacCoffee is a Singaporean brand of instant coffee. It is manufactured by Food Empire Holdings Ltd, a company founded in 1982. Although the brand is originated on Singapore, it is not widely consumed there, having former Soviet countries such as Russia, Ukraine and Kazakhstan as its key markets.

== History ==
The MacCoffee brand was created by Future Enterprises Pte (which became the Food Empire holding) in 1994, which was founded by Tan Wang Cheow in Singapore in 1982 as an IT company. Future Enterprises provided IT solutions (computers and peripherals) for the Soviet Union and Warsaw Pact countries. The coffee idea came in the late 1980s, when the company founder was in Kazakhstan (at the time the Kazakh SSR) in the late 1980s. In that trip, he brought in three bags of 3-in-1 instant coffee. According to Tan, he asked his Kazakh distributors to try it, after which they asked for 22 containers of such item.

The brand began in earnest in 1994 when it entered the Russian and CIS markets by producing coffee mix. In 1995, it opened offices in Moscow and Kazakhstan. In 2006, in Yakhroma (Moscow Oblast) it opened a production facility, with the capacity of producing up to 100 million instant coffee bags per month. In 2010, it appointed WellDis as its Kazakh distributor.

In 2007, it employed a rebranding exercise, introducing new packaging for all of its products, and the "cC" now resempled a steaming coffee cup. Moreover, the bald eagle and the American flag were removed.

== Activities ==
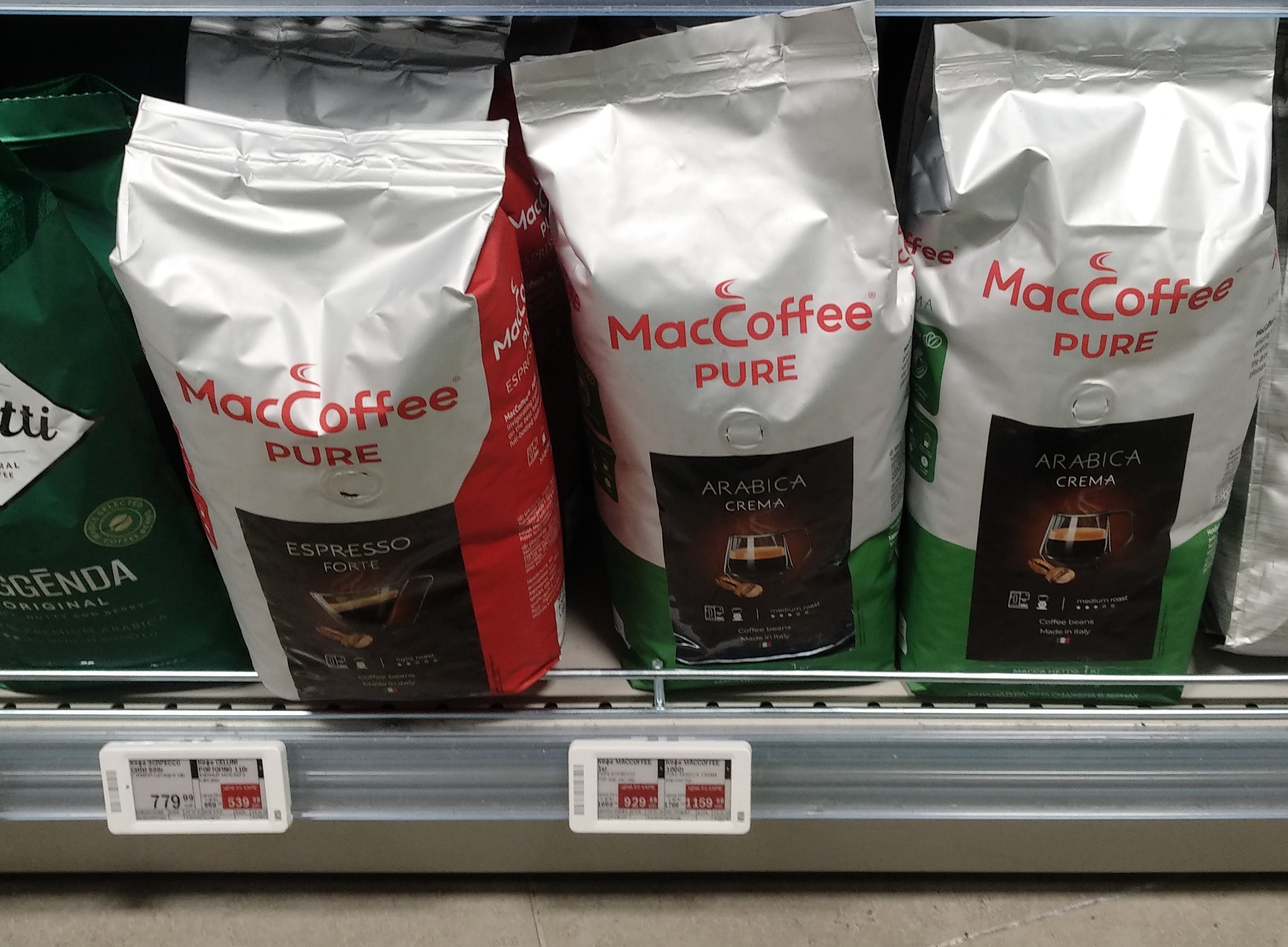
MacCoffee packages at a Moscow supermarket in 2023

MacCoffee is sold in over 50 countries, with 24 offices and nine factories around the world. In 2016, it was the leading instant coffee brand in Food Empire's core markets (Russia, Ukraine and Kazakhstan) where it claims more than 50% of the sector, while the Russian market alone represented more than half of the company's net profits. According to a TNS Central Asia survey, in 2008, MacCoffee was Казахстане's most popular instant coffee brand, with a 79% awareness among respondents and 55% of the sampled population drank it.

In Vietnam, where it has a factory, it claims 7.7% of the instant coffee market as of 2016. It is also available in African countries including Nigeria, Kenya and Cameroon. Initially it only offered its 3-in-1 packages; only in 2014 it was able to sell instant coffee under the MacCoffee Classic brand in 1.6g and 2g bags, as well as 50, 100 and 200g packages. In the first half of 2014, the brand was increasing its presence in its secondary markets, such as Southeast Asia and the Middle East, with a 32.5% increase worth US$15.1 million.

In late 2016, Food Empire's net profit was US$13.8 million, while the company was worth US$242.2 million.

MacCoffee won awards such as Singapore Brand Award, Number 1 Brand in Russia, Choice of the Year (Ukraine), Brand of the Year/Effie Award and others, while the Food Empire company in Singapore was recognised as one of the five most successful SMEs in sales and revenue. In 2012, Channel One Russia's Test Purchase led its blind test among coffee brands.

For several years, MacCoffee was a local sponsor for UEFA championships, FIFA World Cups, European Figure Skating Championships, and Hockey World Cups.

== Trademark dispute ==
In 2002, McDonald’s in Latvia tried to contest the legality of the MacCoffee brand with Future Enterprises Singapore (FES). However, the Latvian Patent Office and the Supreme Court of Latvia considered the US fast food multinational's rationale to be unfounded. Later, McDonald’s tried cancelling other trademarks in Ukraine and Singapore, but these were proven fruitless.

In 2003, FES won a lawsuit against Unipak-Service from Krasnoyarsk, which had a similar product, MaksKofe (МаксКофе). The Moscow Arbitrary Court decided that MaksKofe was an imitation of MacCoffee and forbade the company from selling its products. According to Future Enterprises Singapore, this was the first successful case in Russia to protect the rights of a brand against imitations.

That same year, Future Enterprises Singapore presented an objection to Rospatent regarding the registration of the McCafé brand at McDonald’s, alleging that the Singaporean brand was active in Russia since 1998. In 2004, Rospatent denied McDonald’s denied the right to register McCafé in Russia, but McDonald’s appealed to the court and won in 2006.

In 2016, McDonald’s tried to withdraw the MacCoffee brand in the Lithuanian market to avoid confusions with McCafé. The case was solved in favour to the Singaporean company and the MacCoffee brand continued being sold in that country.
