= 2014 Rally Catalunya =

Motor rally competition

2014 Rally Catalunya: 50. RallyRACC Catalunya – Costa Daurada
Round 12 of the 2014 World Rally Championship season
← Previous event	Next event →
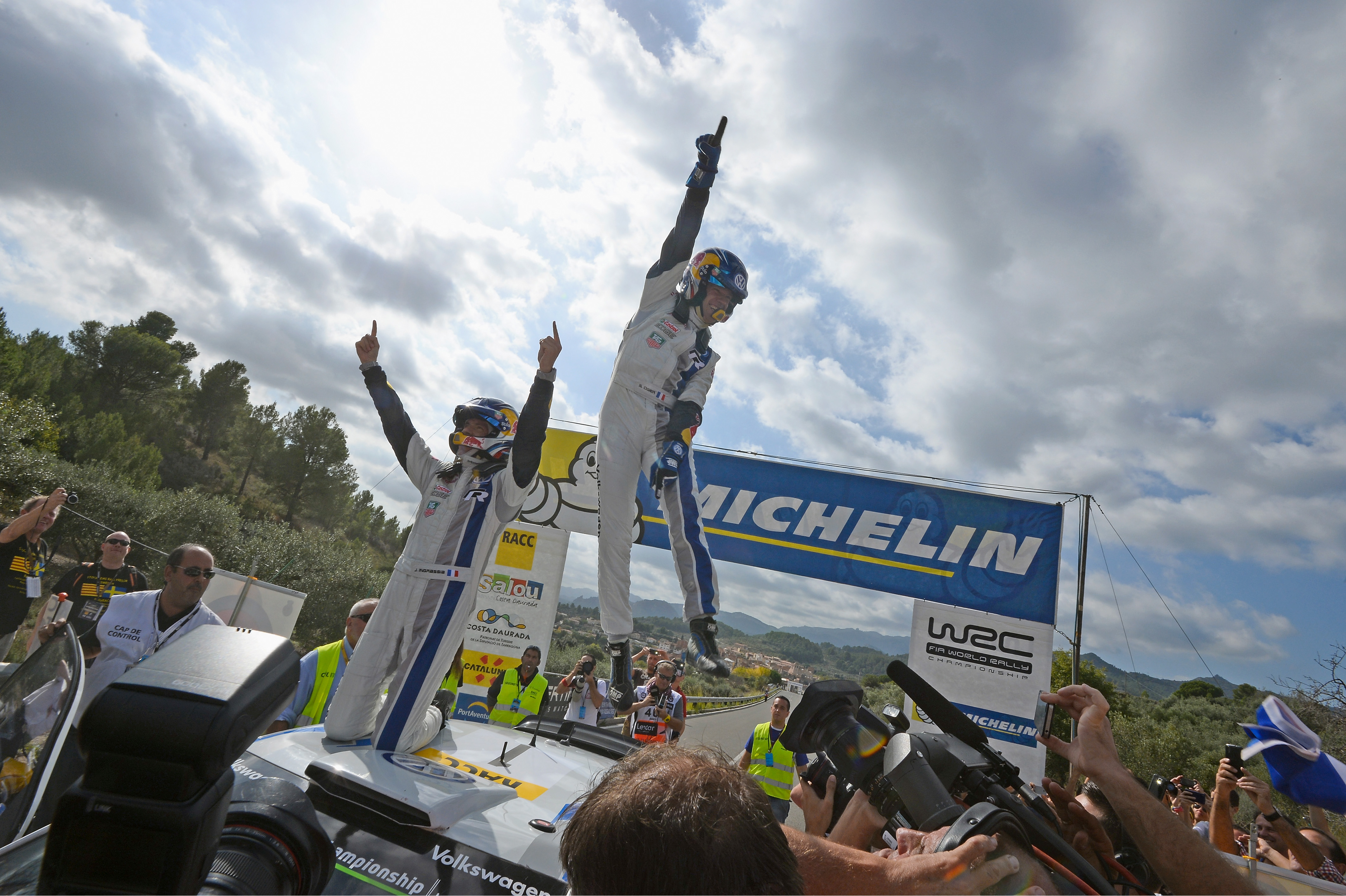
- Sébastien Ogier & Julien Ingrassia celebrates wins Podium
- Host country: Spain
- Rally base: Salou, Catalonia, Spain
- Dates run: October 23 – October 26, 2014
- Stages: 17 (372.96 km; 231.75 miles)
- Stage surface: Tarmac and gravel

Statistics
- Crews: 65 at start, 56 at finish

Overall results
- Overall winner: (France) Sébastien Ogier (France) Julien Ingrassia (Germany) Volkswagen Motorsport

The 2014 RallyRACC Catalunya — Costa Daurada was the twelfth round of the 2014 World Rally Championship season. The event was based in Salou, Catalonia, Spain, and started on 23 October and finished on 26 October after seventeen special stages, totaling just under 373 competitive kilometres.

French driver Sébastien Ogier won the rally for the second time and in doing so became the 2014 World Rally Championship Drivers champion with a round to spare. It was Ogier's second consecutive WRC title since joining Volkswagen in 2013.

== Entry list ==
Notable entrants
No.	Entrant	Class	Driver	Co-driver	Car	Tyre
1	(Germany) Volkswagen Motorsport	WRC	(France) Sébastien Ogier	(France) Julien Ingrassia	Volkswagen Polo R WRC	M
2	(Germany) Volkswagen Motorsport	WRC	(Finland) Jari-Matti Latvala	(Finland) Miikka Anttila	Volkswagen Polo R WRC	M
3	(France) Citroën Total Abu Dhabi WRT	WRC	(United Kingdom) Kris Meeke	(Republic of Ireland) Paul Nagle	Citroën DS3 WRC	M
4	(France) Citroën Total Abu Dhabi WRT	WRC	(Norway) Mads Østberg	(Sweden) Jonas Andersson	Citroën DS3 WRC	M
5	(United Kingdom) M-Sport World Rally Team	WRC	(Finland) Mikko Hirvonen	(Finland) Jarmo Lehtinen	Ford Fiesta RS WRC	M
6	(United Kingdom) M-Sport World Rally Team	WRC	(United Kingdom) Elfyn Evans	(United Kingdom) Daniel Barritt	Ford Fiesta RS WRC	M
7	(Germany) Hyundai Shell World Rally Team	WRC	(Belgium) Thierry Neuville	(Belgium) Nicolas Gilsoul	Hyundai i20 WRC	M
8	(Germany) Hyundai Shell World Rally Team	WRC	(Spain) Dani Sordo	(Spain) Marc Martí	Hyundai i20 WRC	M
9	(Germany) Volkswagen Motorsport II	WRC	(Norway) Andreas Mikkelsen	(Norway) Ola Fløene	Volkswagen Polo R WRC	M
10	(United Kingdom) RK M-Sport World Rally Team	WRC	(Poland) Robert Kubica	(Poland) Maciek Szczepaniak	Ford Fiesta RS WRC	M
12	(France) Citroën Total Abu Dhabi WRT	WRC	(United Arab Emirates) Khalid Al Qassimi	(United Kingdom) Chris Patterson	Citroën DS3 WRC	M
14	(United Kingdom) M-Sport World Rally Team	WRC	(Ukraine) Yuriy Protasov	(Ukraine) Pavlo Cherepin	Ford Fiesta RS WRC	M
15	(United Kingdom) M-Sport World Rally Team	WRC	(United States) Ken Block	(Italy) Alex Gelsomino	Ford Fiesta RS WRC	P
20	(Germany) Hyundai Motorsport N	WRC	(New Zealand) Hayden Paddon	(New Zealand) John Kennard	Hyundai i20 WRC	M
21	(Czech Republic) Jipocar Czech National Team	WRC	(Czech Republic) Martin Prokop	(Czech Republic) Jan Tománek	Ford Fiesta RS WRC	M
32	(Qatar) Nasser Al-Attiyah	WRC-2	(Qatar) Nasser Al-Attiyah	(Italy) Giovanni Bernacchini	Ford Fiesta RRC	M
35	(Estonia) Karl Kruuda	WRC-2	(Estonia) Karl Kruuda	(Estonia) Martin Järveoja	Ford Fiesta S2000	M
36	(Portugal) Bernardo Sousa	WRC-2	(Portugal) Bernardo Sousa	(Portugal) Hugo Magalhães	Ford Fiesta RRC	P
38	(Ukraine) Eurolamp World Rally Team	WRC-2	(Ukraine) Valeriy Gorban	(Ukraine) Volodymyr Korsia	Mini John Cooper Works S2000	P
39	(Republic of Ireland) Robert Barrable	WRC-2	(Republic of Ireland) Robert Barrable	(United Kingdom) Stuart Loudon	Ford Fiesta R5	M
40	(Belgium) Top Teams by MY Racing	WRC-2	(France) Sébastien Chardonnet	(France) Thibault de la Haye	Citroën DS3 R5	M
41	(Peru) Nicolás Fuchs	WRC-2	(Peru) Nicolás Fuchs	(Argentina) Fernando Mussano	Ford Fiesta R5	D
42	(Greece) Jourdan Serderidis	WRC-2	(Greece) Jourdan Serderidis	(Belgium) Frédéric Miclotte	Ford Fiesta R5	M
43	(France) Julien Maurin	WRC-2	(France) Julien Maurin	(France) Nicolas Klinger	Ford Fiesta R5	P
44	(Italy) BAS Motorsport Srl	WRC-2	(Mexico) Benito Guerra, Jr.	(Spain) Borja Rozada	Mitsubishi Lancer Evo X	M
57	(France) Stéphane Lefebvre	WRC-2	(France) Stéphane Lefebvre	(France) Thomas Dubois	Citroën DS3 R5	M
67	(United Arab Emirates) Abu Dhabi Racing	WRC-3	(United Arab Emirates) Mohamed Al Mutawaa	(United Kingdom) Stephen McAuley	Citroën DS3 R3T	M
72	(Argentina) Juan Carlos Alonso	WRC-2	(Argentina) Juan Carlos Alonso	(Argentina) Juan Pablo Monasterolo	Mitsubishi Lancer Evo X	D

Icon	Class
WRC	WRC entries eligible to score manufacturer points
WRC	Major entry ineligible to score manufacturer points
WRC-2	Registered to take part in WRC-2 championship
WRC-3	Registered to take part in WRC-3 championship

== Results ==
=== Event standings ===
Pos.	No.	Driver	Co-driver	Team	Car	Class	Time	Difference	Points
Overall classification
1	1	(France) Sébastien Ogier	(France) Julien Ingrassia	(Germany) Volkswagen Motorsport	Volkswagen Polo R WRC	WRC	3:46:44.6	0.0	25
2	2	(Finland) Jari-Matti Latvala	(Finland) Miikka Anttila	(Germany) Volkswagen Motorsport	Volkswagen Polo R WRC	WRC	3:46:55.9	+11.3	21
3	5	(Finland) Mikko Hirvonen	(Finland) Jarmo Lehtinen	(United Kingdom) M-Sport World Rally Team	Ford Fiesta RS WRC	WRC	3:48:26.8	+1:42.2	15
4	4	(Norway) Mads Østberg	(Sweden) Jonas Andersson	(France) Citroën Total Abu Dhabi WRT	Citroën DS3 WRC	WRC	3:48:57.9	+2:13.3	12
5	8	(Spain) Dani Sordo	(Spain) Marc Martí	(Germany) Hyundai Shell World Rally Team	Hyundai i20 WRC	WRC	3:49:06.8	+2:22.2	10
6	7	(Belgium) Thierry Neuville	(Belgium) Nicolas Gilsoul	(Germany) Hyundai Shell World Rally Team	Hyundai i20 WRC	WRC	3:50:45.6	+4:01.0	8
7	9	(Norway) Andreas Mikkelsen	(Norway) Ola Fløene	(Germany) Volkswagen Motorsport II	Volkswagen Polo R WRC	WRC	3:50:47.5	+4:02.9	7
8	21	(Czech Republic) Martin Prokop	(Czech Republic) Jan Tománek	(Czech Republic) Jipocar Czech National Team	Ford Fiesta RS WRC	WRC	3:54:51.4	+8:06.8	4
9	20	(New Zealand) Hayden Paddon	(New Zealand) John Kennard	(Germany) Hyundai Motorsport N	Hyundai i20 WRC	WRC	3:55:57.0	+9:12.4	2
10	32	(Qatar) Nasser Al-Attiyah	(Italy) Giovanni Bernacchini	(Qatar) Nasser Al-Attiyah	Ford Fiesta RRC	WRC-2	3:59:24.4	+12:39.8	1
19	3	(United Kingdom) Kris Meeke	(Republic of Ireland) Paul Nagle	(France) Citroën Total Abu Dhabi WRT	Citroën DS3 WRC	WRC	4:14:20.6	+27:36.0	2
WRC-2 standings
1 (10.)	32	(Qatar) Nasser Al-Attiyah	(Italy) Giovanni Bernacchini	(Qatar) Nasser Al-Attiyah	Ford Fiesta RRC	WRC-2	3:59:24.4	0.0	25
2 (13.)	43	(France) Julien Maurin	(France) Nicolas Klinger	(France) Julien Maurin	Ford Fiesta R5	WRC-2	3:59:59.4	+35.0	18
3 (16.)	39	(Republic of Ireland) Robert Barrable	(United Kingdom) Stuart Loudon	(Republic of Ireland) Robert Barrable	Ford Fiesta R5	WRC-2	4:03:56.9	+4:32.5	15
4 (18.)	44	(Mexico) Benito Guerra, Jr.	(Spain) Borja Rozada	(Italy) BAS Motorsport Srl	Mitsubishi Lancer Evo X	WRC-2	4:12:10.5	+12:46.1	12
5 (21.)	41	(Peru) Nicolás Fuchs	(Argentina) Fernando Mussano	(Peru) Nicolás Fuchs	Ford Fiesta R5	WRC-2	4:17:42.6	+18:18.2	10
6 (23.)	38	(Ukraine) Valeriy Gorban	(Ukraine) Volodymyr Korsia	(Ukraine) Eurolamp World Rally Team	Mini John Cooper Works S2000	WRC-2	4:21:21.0	+21:56.6	8
7 (24.)	35	(Estonia) Karl Kruuda	(Estonia) Martin Järveoja	(Estonia) Karl Kruuda	Ford Fiesta S2000	WRC-2	4:21:24.1	+21:59.7	6
8 (40.)	42	(Greece) Jourdan Serderidis	(Belgium) Frédéric Miclotte	(Greece) Jourdan Serderidis	Ford Fiesta R5	WRC-2	4:41:22.5	+41:58.1	4
WRC-3 standings
1 (47.)	67	(United Arab Emirates) Mohamed Al Mutawaa	(United Kingdom) Stephen McAuley	(United Arab Emirates) Abu Dhabi Racing	Citroën DS3 R3T	WRC-3	4:51:22.6	0.0	25

=== Special stages ===
Day	Stage	Name	Length	Winner	Car	Time	Rally leader
Leg 1 (23/24 Oct)	SS1	Barcelona	3.20 km	(Norway) Andreas Mikkelsen	Volkswagen Polo R WRC	3:39.1	(Norway) Andreas Mikkelsen
Leg 1 (23/24 Oct)	SS2	Gandesa 1	7.00 km	(United Kingdom) Kris Meeke	Citroën DS3 WRC	4:26.3	(Norway) Andreas Mikkelsen
Leg 1 (23/24 Oct)	SS3	Pesells 1	26.59 km	(New Zealand) Hayden Paddon	Hyundai i20 WRC	15:26.6	(Belgium) Thierry Neuville
Leg 1 (23/24 Oct)	SS4	Terra Alta 1	35.68 km	(France) Sébastien Ogier	Volkswagen Polo R WRC	23:26.1	(France) Sébastien Ogier
Leg 1 (23/24 Oct)	SS5	Gandesa 2	7.00 km	(France) Sébastien Ogier	Volkswagen Polo R WRC	4:23.0	(France) Sébastien Ogier
Leg 1 (23/24 Oct)	SS6	Pesells 2	26.59 km	(Belgium) Thierry Neuville	Hyundai i20 WRC	14:43.3	(France) Sébastien Ogier
Leg 1 (23/24 Oct)	SS7	Terra Alta 2	35.68 km	(France) Sébastien Ogier	Volkswagen Polo R WRC	22:46.1	(France) Sébastien Ogier
Leg 2 (25 Oct)	SS8	Tivissa	3.96 km	(Finland) Jari-Matti Latvala	Volkswagen Polo R WRC	2:25.6	(France) Sébastien Ogier
Leg 2 (25 Oct)	SS9	Escaladei 1	50.00 km	(Finland) Jari-Matti Latvala	Volkswagen Polo R WRC	29:14.4	(France) Sébastien Ogier
Leg 2 (25 Oct)	SS10	Colldejou 1	26.48 km	(Finland) Jari-Matti Latvala	Volkswagen Polo R WRC	15:41.6	(France) Sébastien Ogier
Leg 2 (25 Oct)	SS11	Escaladei 2	50.00 km	(France) Sébastien Ogier	Volkswagen Polo R WRC	29:17.9	(France) Sébastien Ogier
Leg 2 (25 Oct)	SS12	Colldejou 2	26.48 km	(Finland) Jari-Matti Latvala	Volkswagen Polo R WRC	15:40.6	(France) Sébastien Ogier
Leg 2 (25 Oct)	SS13	Salou	2.24 km	(Norway) Andreas Mikkelsen	Volkswagen Polo R WRC	2:36.4	(France) Sébastien Ogier
Leg 3 (26 Oct)	SS14	La Mussara 1	20.48 km	(Finland) Jari-Matti Latvala	Volkswagen Polo R WRC	11:08.3	(France) Sébastien Ogier
Leg 3 (26 Oct)	SS15	Riudecanyes 1	15.55 km	(Finland) Jari-Matti Latvala	Volkswagen Polo R WRC	10:00.1	(France) Sébastien Ogier
Leg 3 (26 Oct)	SS16	La Mussara 2	20.48 km	(Finland) Jari-Matti Latvala	Volkswagen Polo R WRC	11:05.6	(France) Sébastien Ogier
Leg 3 (26 Oct)	SS17	Riudecanyes 2 (Power Stage)	15.55 km	(Finland) Jari-Matti Latvala	Volkswagen Polo R WRC	10:00.1	(France) Sébastien Ogier

=== Power Stage ===
The "Power stage" was a 15.55 km (9.66 mi) stage at the end of the rally.

Pos	Driver	Car	Time	Diff.	Pts
1	(Finland) Jari-Matti Latvala	Volkswagen Polo R WRC	10:00.1	0.0	3
2	(United Kingdom) Kris Meeke	Citroën DS3 WRC	10:01.8	+1.7	2
3	(Norway) Andreas Mikkelsen	Volkswagen Polo R WRC	10:02.0	+1.9	1

== Standings after the rally ==
=== WRC ===
Drivers' Championship standings

Pos.	Driver	Points
1	(France) Sebastien Ogier	242
2	(Finland) Jari-Matti Latvala	211
3	(Norway) Andreas Mikkelsen	150
4	(Finland) Mikko Hirvonen	108
5	(Norway) Mads Østberg	92

Manufacturers' Championship standings

Pos.	Manufacturer	Points
1	(Germany) Volkswagen Motorsport	416
2	(France) Citroën Total Abu Dhabi WRT	187
3	(United Kingdom) M-Sport World Rally Team	180
4	(Germany) Hyundai Shell World Rally Team	175
5	(Germany) Volkswagen Motorsport II	133

=== Other ===
WRC2 Drivers' Championship standings

Pos.	Driver	Points
1	(Qatar) Nasser Al-Attiyah	110
2	(Italy) Lorenzo Bertelli	93
3	(Ukraine) Yuriy Protasov	90
4	(Finland) Jari Ketomaa	90
5	(Estonia) Karl Kruuda	80

WRC3 Drivers' Championship standings

Pos.	Driver	Points
1	(France) Stéphane Lefebvre	79
2	(Germany) Christian Riedemann	46
3	(France) Quentin Giordano	46
4	(Slovakia) Martin Koči	45
5	(United Kingdom) Alastair Fisher	40

Junior WRC Drivers' Championship standings

Pos.	Driver	Points
1	(France) Stéphane Lefebvre	93
2	(United Kingdom) Alastair Fisher	67
3	(France) Quentin Giordano	64
4	(Slovakia) Martin Koči	52
5	(Germany) Christian Riedemann	46
