= Patent Office of the Republic of Latvia =

Patent office based in Latvia

- Latvijas Republikas Patentu valde
- Formation: February 5, 1920; 106 years ago
- Type: Governmental organization
- Headquarters: Riga
- Director: Agris Batalauskis
- Parent organization: Ministry of Justice
- Website: www.lrpv.gov.lv/en

The Patent Office of the Republic of Latvia (Latvian: Patentu valde) is an independent state institution operating under the supervision of the Ministry of Justice of the Republic of Latvia. It is the central authority in the field of industrial property protection in Latvia.
