= 2011 Rally Catalunya =

2011 Rally Catalunya 47è Rally RACC Catalunya – Costa Daurada RACC Rally de España
Round 12 of the 2011 World Rally Championship season
← Previous event	Next event →
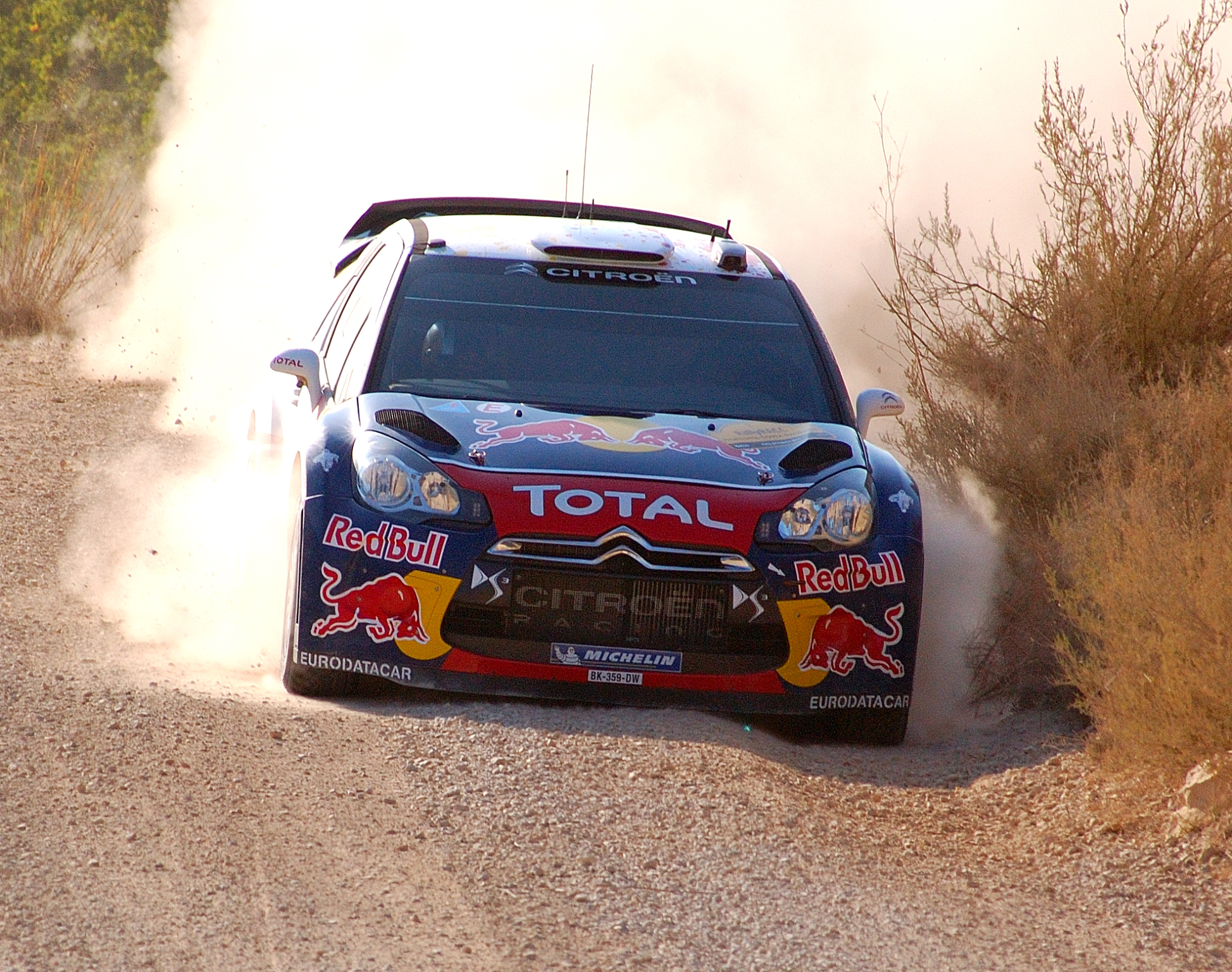
- Host country: Spain
- Rally base: Salou, Tarragona
- Dates run: October 21 – 23 2011
- Stages: 18 (406.52 km; 252.60 miles)
- Stage surface: Asphalt with some gravel
- Overall distance: 1,589.90 km (987.92 miles)

Statistics
- Crews: 58 at start, 44 at finish

Overall results
- Overall winner: (France) Sébastien Loeb (France) Citroën World Rally Team

The 2011 Rally Catalunya, formally 47è Rally RACC Catalunya – Costa Daurada and the denoted RACC Rally de España, was the twelfth round of the 2011 World Rally Championship season. The rally took place from 21 to 23 October, and was based in Salou, Catalonia. The rally was also the eighth and final round of the Super 2000 World Rally Championship, and the sixth round of the Production World Rally Championship.

The rally was won by championship leader Sébastien Loeb, who took his fifth victory of the season, and the 67th of his career after taking the lead at the end of the first day's running and holding on to extend his championship lead ahead of the final round in Wales. In doing so, he also secured a seventh manufacturers' title for Citroën. Loeb's title rival Mikko Hirvonen finished second after team-mate Jari-Matti Latvala, who finished third, incurred a two-minute time penalty in order to gain as many points as possible for Hirvonen's title challenge.

In the SWRC, Juho Hänninen finished at the head of the class in tenth overall, and as a result, secured the SWRC title, ahead of Ott Tänak. In the PWRC, Patrik Flodin just fended off a challenge from Michał Kościuszko in the late stages of the rally, with Flodin coming out on top by just two seconds.

== Results ==
=== Event standings ===
Pos.	Driver	Co-driver	Car	Time	Difference	Points
Overall
1.	(France) Sébastien Loeb	(Monaco) Daniel Elena	Citroën DS3 WRC	4:05:39.3	0.0	26
2.	(Finland) Mikko Hirvonen	(Finland) Jarmo Lehtinen	Ford Fiesta RS WRC	4:07:46.2	2:06.9	18
3.	(Finland) Jari-Matti Latvala	(Finland) Miikka Anttila	Ford Fiesta RS WRC	4:08:11.7	2:32.4	15
4.	(Spain) Dani Sordo	(Spain) Carlos Del Barrio	Mini John Cooper Works WRC	4:09:03.4	3:24.1	14
5.	(United Kingdom) Kris Meeke	(Republic of Ireland) Paul Nagle	Mini John Cooper Works WRC	4:10:54.3	5:15.0	13
6.	(Norway) Mads Østberg	(Sweden) Jonas Andersson	Ford Fiesta RS WRC	4:11:33.5	5:54.2	8
7.	(Russia) Evgeny Novikov	(France) Denis Giraudet	Citroën DS3 WRC	4:15:11.1	9:31.8	6
8.	(Norway) Henning Solberg	(Austria) Ilka Minor	Ford Fiesta RS WRC	4:15:19.4	9:40.1	4
9.	(Netherlands) Dennis Kuipers	(Belgium) Frédéric Miclotte	Ford Fiesta RS WRC	4:16:53.1	11:13.8	2
10.	(Finland) Juho Hänninen	(Finland) Mikko Markkula	Škoda Fabia S2000	4:19:28.5	13:49.2	1
SWRC
1. (10.)	(Finland) Juho Hänninen	(Finland) Mikko Markkula	Škoda Fabia S2000	4:19:28.5	0.0	25
2. (11.)	(Qatar) Nasser Al-Attiyah	(Italy) Giovanni Bernacchini	Ford Fiesta S2000	4:19:43.4	14.9	18
3. (13.)	(Czech Republic) Martin Prokop	(Czech Republic) Jan Tománek	Ford Fiesta S2000	4:20:26.2	57.7	15
4. (15.)	(Republic of Ireland) Craig Breen	(United Kingdom) Gareth Roberts	Ford Fiesta S2000	4:21:48.7	2:20.2	12
5. (18.)	(Germany) Hermann Gassner	(Germany) Timo Gottschalk	Škoda Fabia S2000	4:24:30.6	5:02.1	10
6. (27.)	(Estonia) Ott Tänak	(Estonia) Kuldar Sikk	Ford Fiesta S2000	4:49:41.2	30:12.7	8
7. (28.)	(Estonia) Karl Kruuda	(Estonia) Martin Järveoja	Škoda Fabia S2000	4:50:29.9	31:01.4	6
8. (40.)	(Andorra) Albert Llovera	(Spain) Diego Vallejo	Abarth Grande Punto S2000	5:12:07.6	52:39.1	4
PWRC
1. (21.)	(Sweden) Patrik Flodin	(Sweden) Göran Bergsten	Subaru Impreza WRX STI	4:29:40.7	0.0	25
2. (22.)	(Poland) Michał Kościuszko	(Poland) Maciej Szczepaniak	Mitsubishi Lancer Evolution X	4:29:42.7	2.0	18
3. (24.)	(Mexico) Benito Guerra	(Spain) Borja Rozada	Mitsubishi Lancer Evolution X	4:39:26.2	9:45.5	15
4. (29.)	(United Arab Emirates) Bader Al Jabri	(United Kingdom) Stephen McAuley	Subaru Impreza WRX STI	4:50:47.3	21:06.6	12
5. (30.)	(Ukraine) Oleksandr Saliuk, Jr.	(Ukraine) Pavlo Cherepin	Mitsubishi Lancer Evolution IX	4:52:48.0	23:07.3	10
6. (31.)	(Peru) Nicolás Fuchs	(Spain) Cándido Carerra	Mitsubishi Lancer Evolution X	4:53:58.4	24:17.7	8
7. (32.)	(Ukraine) Valeriy Gorban	(Ukraine) Andrey Nikolayev	Mitsubishi Lancer Evolution IX	4:55:48.4	26:07.7	6
8. (34.)	(New Zealand) Hayden Paddon	(New Zealand) John Kennard	Subaru Impreza WRX STI	5:01:04.1	31:23.4	4
9. (35.)	(Ukraine) Oleksiy Kikireshko	(Estonia) Sergey Larens	Mitsubishi Lancer Evolution IX	5:06:47.2	37:06.5	2
10. (36.)	(Czech Republic) Martin Semerád	(Czech Republic) Michal Ernst	Mitsubishi Lancer Evolution IX	5:07:04.3	37:23.6	1

=== Special stages ===
All dates and times are CEST (UTC+2).

Day	Stage	Time	Name	Length	Winner	Time	Avg. spd.	Rally leader
Leg 1 (21 October)	SS1	8:43	Pesells 1	25.74 km	(France) Sébastien Loeb	15:18.7	100.86 km/h	(France) Sébastien Loeb
Leg 1 (21 October)	SS2	9:51	Terra Alta 1	35.94 km	(France) Sébastien Ogier	23:49.4	90.52 km/h	(France) Sébastien Loeb
Leg 1 (21 October)	SS3	11:29	Les Garrigues 1	18.50 km	(France) Sébastien Ogier	13:14.7	83.81 km/h	(France) Sébastien Loeb
Leg 1 (21 October)	SS4	16:42	Pesells 2	25.74 km	(Finland) Jari-Matti Latvala	14:42.2	105.04 km/h	(Finland) Jari-Matti Latvala
Leg 1 (21 October)	SS5	17:50	Terra Alta 2	35.94 km	(Finland) Jari-Matti Latvala	23:19.4	92.46 km/h	(Finland) Jari-Matti Latvala
Leg 1 (21 October)	SS6	19:28	Les Garrigues 2	18.50 km	(France) Sébastien Loeb	13:14.5	83.83 km/h	(France) Sébastien Loeb
Leg 2 (22 October)	SS7	9:40	El Priorat 1	45.97 km	(France) Sébastien Loeb	25:35.9	107.75 km/h	(France) Sébastien Loeb
Leg 2 (22 October)	SS8	11:08	Riba-roja d'Ebre 1	12.27 km	(France) Sébastien Loeb	8:06.9	90.72 km/h	(France) Sébastien Loeb
Leg 2 (22 October)	SS9	11:33	Punta de les Torres 1	13.53 km	(Finland) Jari-Matti Latvala	7:05.7	114.42 km/h	(France) Sébastien Loeb
Leg 2 (22 October)	SS10	14:48	El Priorat 2	45.97 km	(Finland) Jari-Matti Latvala	25:39.1	107.53 km/h	(France) Sébastien Loeb
Leg 2 (22 October)	SS11	16:16	Riba-roja d'Ebre 2	12.27 km	(Spain) Dani Sordo	8:12.3	89.73 km/h	(France) Sébastien Loeb
Leg 2 (22 October)	SS12	16:41	Punta de les Torres 2	13.53 km	(Finland) Jari-Matti Latvala	7:04.2	114.82 km/h	(France) Sébastien Loeb
Leg 3 (23 October)	SS13	7:02	Santa Marina 1	26.51 km	(France) Sébastien Ogier	15:55.3	99.90 km/h	(France) Sébastien Loeb
Leg 3 (23 October)	SS14	8:22	La Mussara 1	20.48 km	(Finland) Mikko Hirvonen	11:13.6	109.45 km/h	(France) Sébastien Loeb
Leg 3 (23 October)	SS15	9:12	Coll de la Teixeta 1	4.32 km	(France) Sébastien Loeb	2:37.0	99.06 km/h	(France) Sébastien Loeb
Leg 3 (23 October)	SS16	11:39	Santa Marina 2	26.51 km	(France) Sébastien Ogier	15:37.9	101.75 km/h	(France) Sébastien Loeb
Leg 3 (23 October)	SS17	12:59	La Mussara 2	20.48 km	(Finland) Jari-Matti Latvala	11:09.6	110.11 km/h	(France) Sébastien Loeb
Leg 3 (23 October)	SS18	14:11	Coll de la Teixeta 2 (Power stage)	4.32 km	(United Kingdom) Kris Meeke	2:45.7	93.86 km/h	(France) Sébastien Loeb

=== Power Stage ===
The "Power stage" was a live, televised 4.32 km (2.68 mi) stage at the end of the rally, held near Pradell de la Teixeta.

Pos	Driver	Time	Diff.	Avg. speed	Points
1	(United Kingdom) Kris Meeke	2:45.7	0.0	93.86 km/h	3
2	(Spain) Dani Sordo	2:45.9	+0.2	93.74 km/h	2
3	(France) Sébastien Loeb	2:50.6	+4.9	91.16 km/h	1
