= 2012 Rally New Zealand =

Motor rally competition

2012 Rally New Zealand 42nd Brother Rally New Zealand
Round 7 of the 2012 World Rally Championship season
← Previous event	Next event →
- Host country: New Zealand
- Rally base: Auckland, New Zealand
- Dates run: 22 – 24 June 2012
- Stages: 22 (413.94 km; 257.21 miles)
- Stage surface: Gravel
- Overall distance: 1,656.38 km (1,029.23 miles)

Overall results
- Overall winner: (France) Sébastien Loeb (France) Citroën Total WRT

The 42nd Brother Rally New Zealand was the seventh round of 2012 FIA World Rally Championship. The event took place between 22 and 24 June 2012.

== Results ==
=== Event standings ===
Pos.	Driver	Co-driver	Car	Time	Difference	Points
Overall
1.	(France) Sébastien Loeb	(Monaco) Daniel Elena	Citroën DS3 WRC	4:04:51.2	0.0	26
2.	(Finland) Mikko Hirvonen	(Finland) Jarmo Lehtinen	Citroën DS3 WRC	4:05:20.8	29.6	18
3.	(Norway) Petter Solberg	(United Kingdom) Chris Patterson	Ford Fiesta RS WRC	4:06:27.6	1:36.4	17
4.	(Russia) Evgeny Novikov	(France) Denis Giraudet	Ford Fiesta RS WRC	4:07:04.8	2:13.6	12
5.	(Belgium) Thierry Neuville	(Belgium) Nicolas Gilsoul	Citroën DS3 WRC	4:07:33.6	2:42.4	10
6.	(Spain) Dani Sordo	(Spain) Carlos del Barrio	Mini John Cooper Works WRC	4:07:54.3	3:03.1	8
7.	(Finland) Jari-Matti Latvala	(Finland) Miikka Anttila	Ford Fiesta RS WRC	4:09:44.1	4:52.9	9
8.	(Portugal) Armindo Araújo	(Portugal) Miguel Ramalho	Mini John Cooper Works WRC	4:14:27.6	9:36.4	4
9.	(United States) Ken Block	(Italy) Alex Gelsomino	Ford Fiesta RS WRC	4:15:21.5	10:30.3	2
10.	(Austria) Manfred Stohl	(Austria) Ilka Minor	Ford Fiesta RS WRC	4:16:17.5	11:26.3	1
SWRC
1. (12.)	(New Zealand) Hayden Paddon	(New Zealand) John Kennard	Škoda Fabia S2000	4:20:17.4	0.0	25
2. (23.)	(Sweden) Per-Gunnar Andersson	(Sweden) Emil Axelsson	Proton Satria Neo S2000	4:53:37.1	+33:19.7	18
3. (26.)	(Poland) Maciej Oleksowicz	(Poland) Andrzej Obrebowski	Ford Fiesta S2000	5:03:55.3	+43:37.9	15
4. (28.)	(Saudi Arabia) Yazeed Al-Rajhi	(United Kingdom) Michael Orr	Ford Fiesta RRC	5:10:02.5	+49:45.1	12
PWRC
1. (16.)	(Argentina) Marcos Ligato	(Argentina) Rubén Garcíá	Subaru Impreza WRX STi	4:35:20.9	0.0	25
2. (18.)	(Indonesia) Subhan Aksa	(New Zealand) Jeff Judd	Mitsubishi Lancer Evo X	4:41:11.7	+5:50.8	18
3. (19.)	(Mexico) Ricardo Triviño	(Spain) Àlex Haro	Mitsubishi Lancer Evo IX	4:42:27.9	+7:07.0	15
4. (20.)	(Ukraine) Valeriy Gorban	(Ukraine) Andriy Nikolaiev	Mitsubishi Lancer Evo IX	4:43:30.3	+8:09.4	12
5. (22.)	(Italy) Gianluca Linari	(Italy) Nicola Arena	Subaru Impreza WRX STi	4:53:33.1	+18:12.2	10
6. (27.)	(United Kingdom) Louise Cook	(United Kingdom) Stefan Davis	Ford Fiesta ST	5:07:21.3	+32:00.4	8

=== Special stages ===
All dates and times are NZST (UTC+12).

Day	Stage	Time	Name	Length	Winner	Time	Avg. spd.	Rally leader
Leg 1 (22 Jun)	SS1	8:28	Te Hutewai 1	11.18 km	(Finland) Jari-Matti Latvala	7:38.4	87.80 km/h	(Finland) Jari-Matti Latvala
Leg 1 (22 Jun)	SS2	8:51	Brother Whaanga Coast 1	29.67 km	(Finland) Mikko Hirvonen	20:51.8	85.32 km/h	(Finland) Mikko Hirvonen
Leg 1 (22 Jun)	SS3	10:24	Te Akau South 1	31.82 km	(France) Sébastien Loeb	18:21.9	103.96 km/h	(Finland) Mikko Hirvonen
Leg 1 (22 Jun)	SS4	11:07	Te Akau North 1	32.13 km	(France) Sébastien Loeb	17:04.3	112.92 km/h	(Finland) Mikko Hirvonen
Leg 1 (22 Jun)	SS5	13:33	Te Hutewai 2	11.18 km	(France) Sébastien Loeb	7:33.5	88.75 km/h	(Finland) Mikko Hirvonen
Leg 1 (22 Jun)	SS6	13:56	Brother Whaanga Coast 2	29.67 km	(Finland) Mikko Hirvonen	20:41.3	86.04 km/h	(Finland) Mikko Hirvonen
Leg 1 (22 Jun)	SS7	15:29	Te Akau South 2	31.82 km	(France) Sébastien Loeb	18:09.9	105.10 km/h	(Finland) Mikko Hirvonen
Leg 1 (22 Jun)	SS8	16:12	Te Akau North 2	32.13 km	(France) Sébastien Loeb	16:54.1	114.05 km/h	(France) Sébastien Loeb
Leg 2 (23 Jun)	SS9	9:13	Batley	17.61 km	(Norway) Petter Solberg	9:45.3	108.31 km/h	(France) Sébastien Loeb
Leg 2 (23 Jun)	SS10	10:01	Brother Mititai 1	23.22 km	(Finland) Jari-Matti Latvala	12:14.4	113.82 km/h	(France) Sébastien Loeb
Leg 2 (23 Jun)	SS11	10:34	Girls High School 1	26.99 km	(Norway) Petter Solberg	15:34.6	103.96 km/h	(France) Sébastien Loeb
Leg 2 (23 Jun)	SS12	14:02	Waipu Gorge	11.38 km	(France) Sébastien Loeb	6:34.2	103.92 km/h	(France) Sébastien Loeb
Leg 2 (23 Jun)	SS13	14:25	Brooks	13.6 km	(France) Sébastien Loeb	8:00.7	101.85 km/h	(France) Sébastien Loeb
Leg 2 (23 Jun)	SS14	15:08	Brother Mititai 1	23.22 km	(Finland) Jari-Matti Latvala	12:13.6	113.94 km/h	(France) Sébastien Loeb
Leg 2 (23 Jun)	SS15	15:41	Girls High School 1	26.99 km	(Finland) Mikko Hirvonen	15:36.2	103.79 km/h	(France) Sébastien Loeb
Leg 3 (24 Jun)	SS16	8:08	Burnside / Wech Access 1	7.30 km	(Belgium) Thierry Neuville	4:13.6	103.62 km/h	(France) Sébastien Loeb
Leg 3 (24 Jun)	SS17	8:26	Brother Puhoi 1	17.94 km	(Belgium) Thierry Neuville	10:22.6	103.73 km/h	(France) Sébastien Loeb
Leg 3 (24 Jun)	SS18	9:44	SSS Auckland Domain 1	2.05 km	(Spain) Dani Sordo	1:44.0	70.96 km/h	(France) Sébastien Loeb
Leg 3 (24 Jun)	SS19	11:28	SSS Auckland Domain 2	2.05 km	(Spain) Dani Sordo	1:41.7	72.56 km/h	(France) Sébastien Loeb
Leg 3 (24 Jun)	SS20	12:36	Brother Puhoi 2	17.94 km	(Belgium) Thierry Neuville	10:22.2	103.80 km/h	(France) Sébastien Loeb
Leg 3 (24 Jun)	SS21	13:09	Auckland Conventions Ahuroa	6.75 km	(Finland) Jari-Matti Latvala	3:58.6	101.84 km/h	(France) Sébastien Loeb
Leg 3 (24 Jun)	SS22	13:40	Burnside / Wech Access 2 (Power Stage)	7.30 km	(Finland) Jari-Matti Latvala	4:14.3	103.34 km/h	(France) Sébastien Loeb

=== Power stage ===
The three fastest crews of this stage were awarded by championship points.

Pos.	Driver	Co-driver	Car	Time	Difference	Avg. spd.	Points
1.	(Finland) Jari-Matti Latvala	(Finland) Miikka Anttila	Ford Fiesta RS WRC	4:14.3	0.0	103.34 km/h	3
2.	(Norway) Petter Solberg	(United Kingdom) Chris Patterson	Ford Fiesta RS WRC	4:15.8	1.5	102.74 km/h	2
3.	(France) Sébastien Loeb	(Monaco) Daniel Elena	Citroën DS3 WRC	4:16.0	1.7	102.66 km/h	1
