= 2015 Rally Finland =

Motor rally competition

Rally Finland 2015: 65. Neste Oil Rally Finland
Round 8 of the 2015 World Rally Championship season
← Previous event	Next event →
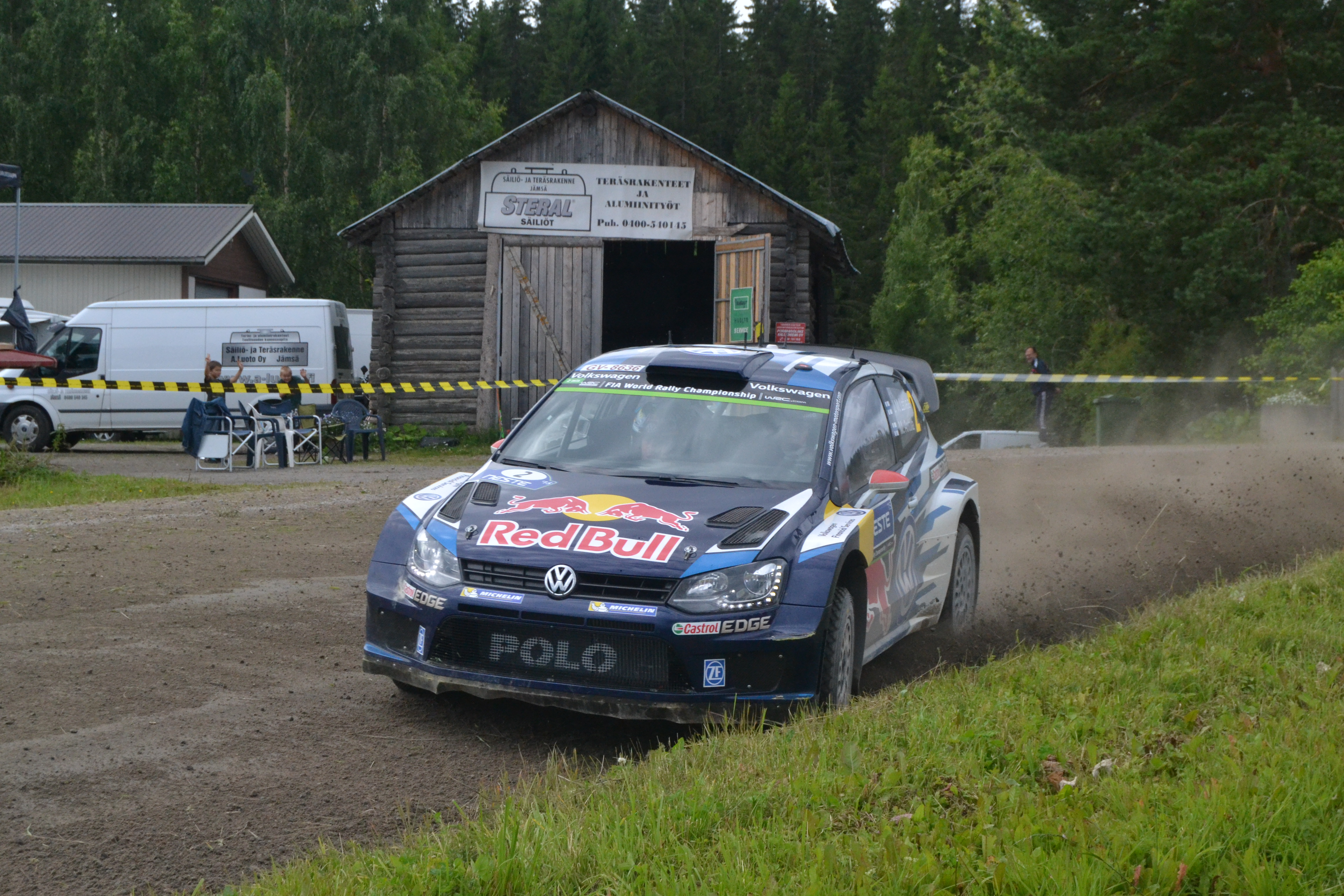
- Jari-Matti Latvala and Miikka Anttila during the rally.
- Host country: Finland
- Rally base: Jyväskylä, Finland
- Dates run: July 30 – August 2, 2015
- Stages: 20 (320.00 km; 198.84 miles)
- Stage surface: Gravel

Overall results
- Overall winner: (Finland) Jari-Matti Latvala (Finland) Miikka Anttila (Germany) Volkswagen Motorsport; Volkswagen Polo R WRC; 2:33:03.8

Support category results
- WRC-2 winner: (Finland) Esapekka Lappi (Finland) Janne Ferm (Czech Republic) Škoda Motorsport; Škoda Fabia R5; 2:40:15.0
- WRC-3 winner: (France) Quentin Gilbert (Belgium) Renaud Jamoul; Citroën DS3 R3T Max; 2:54:43.6
- J-WRC winner: (France) Quentin Gilbert (Belgium) Renaud Jamoul; Citroën DS3 R3T Max; 2:54:43.6

The 2015 Rally Finland (65th Neste Oil Rally Finland) was the eighth round of the 2015 World Rally Championship season, the top international rallying competition. It was held around Jyväskylä, Finland from 30 July to 2 August 2015. Jari-Matti Latvala won the rally, his third victory in his home country of Finland.

== Special stages ==
Day	Stage number	Stage name	Length	Stage winner	Car No.	Team	Time	Rally leader
30 Jul	SS1	(Finland) Harju 1	2.27 km	(France) Sébastien Ogier (France) Julien Ingrassia	1	(Germany) Volkswagen Motorsport	1:48.6	(France) Sébastien Ogier (France) Julien Ingrassia
31 Jul	SS2	(Finland) Pihlajakoski 1	14.51 km	(Finland) Jari-Matti Latvala (Finland) Miikka Anttila	2	(Germany) Volkswagen Motorsport	6:36.4	(United Kingdom) Kris Meeke (Republic of Ireland) Paul Nagle
31 Jul	SS3	(Finland) Päijälä 1	23.56 km	(France) Sébastien Ogier (France) Julien Ingrassia	1	(Germany) Volkswagen Motorsport	10:49.4	(France) Sébastien Ogier (France) Julien Ingrassia
31 Jul	SS4	(Finland) Ouninpohja 1	34.39 km	(France) Sébastien Ogier (France) Julien Ingrassia	1	(Germany) Volkswagen Motorsport	15:53.9	(France) Sébastien Ogier (France) Julien Ingrassia
31 Jul	SS5	(Finland) Himos 1	5.62 km	(France) Sébastien Ogier (France) Julien Ingrassia	1	(Germany) Volkswagen Motorsport	3:17.7	(France) Sébastien Ogier (France) Julien Ingrassia
31 Jul	SS6	(Finland) Pihlajakoski 2	14.51 km	(Finland) Jari-Matti Latvala (Finland) Miikka Anttila	2	(Germany) Volkswagen Motorsport	6:32.0	(France) Sébastien Ogier (France) Julien Ingrassia
31 Jul	SS7	(Finland) Päijälä 2	23.56 km	(United Kingdom) Kris Meeke (Republic of Ireland) Paul Nagle	3	(France) Citroën Total Abu Dhabi World Rally Team	10:36.9	(France) Sébastien Ogier (France) Julien Ingrassia
31 Jul	SS8	(Finland) Ouninpohja 2	34.39 km	(Finland) Jari-Matti Latvala (Finland) Miikka Anttila	2	(Germany) Volkswagen Motorsport	15:36.8	(Finland) Jari-Matti Latvala (Finland) Miikka Anttila
31 Jul	SS9	(Finland) Himos 2	5.62 km	(Finland) Jari-Matti Latvala (Finland) Miikka Anttila	2	(Germany) Volkswagen Motorsport	3:13.4	(Finland) Jari-Matti Latvala (Finland) Miikka Anttila
31 Jul	SS10	(Finland) Harju 2	2.27 km	(France) Sébastien Ogier (France) Julien Ingrassia	1	(Germany) Volkswagen Motorsport	1:43.4	(Finland) Jari-Matti Latvala (Finland) Miikka Anttila
1 Aug	SS11	(Finland) Mökkiperä 1	13.84 km	(Finland) Jari-Matti Latvala (Finland) Miikka Anttila	2	(Germany) Volkswagen Motorsport	6:45.3	(Finland) Jari-Matti Latvala (Finland) Miikka Anttila
1 Aug	SS12	(Finland) Jukojärvi 1	21.14 km	(France) Sébastien Ogier (France) Julien Ingrassia	1	(Germany) Volkswagen Motorsport	9:55.4	(Finland) Jari-Matti Latvala (Finland) Miikka Anttila
1 Aug	SS13	(Finland) Surkee 1	14.95 km	(France) Sébastien Ogier (France) Julien Ingrassia	1	(Germany) Volkswagen Motorsport	7:59.7	(Finland) Jari-Matti Latvala (Finland) Miikka Anttila
1 Aug	SS14	(Finland) Horkka 1	15.59 km	(Finland) Jari-Matti Latvala (Finland) Miikka Anttila	2	(Germany) Volkswagen Motorsport	7:16.7	(Finland) Jari-Matti Latvala (Finland) Miikka Anttila
1 Aug	SS15	(Finland) Mökkiperä 2	13.84 km	(France) Sébastien Ogier (France) Julien Ingrassia	1	(Germany) Volkswagen Motorsport	6:39.3	(Finland) Jari-Matti Latvala (Finland) Miikka Anttila
1 Aug	SS16	(Finland) Jukojärvi 2	21.14 km	(Finland) Jari-Matti Latvala (Finland) Miikka Anttila	2	(Germany) Volkswagen Motorsport	10:12.7	(Finland) Jari-Matti Latvala (Finland) Miikka Anttila
1 Aug	SS17	(Finland) Surkee 2	14.95 km	(Finland) Jari-Matti Latvala (Finland) Miikka Anttila	2	(Germany) Volkswagen Motorsport	7:51.5	(Finland) Jari-Matti Latvala (Finland) Miikka Anttila
1 Aug	SS18	(Finland) Horkka 2	15.59 km	(Finland) Jari-Matti Latvala (Finland) Miikka Anttila	2	(Germany) Volkswagen Motorsport	7:16.7	(Finland) Jari-Matti Latvala (Finland) Miikka Anttila
2 Aug	SS19	(Finland) Myhinpää 1	14.13 km	(Finland) Jari-Matti Latvala (Finland) Miikka Anttila	2	(Germany) Volkswagen Motorsport	6:26.7	(Finland) Jari-Matti Latvala (Finland) Miikka Anttila
2 Aug	SS20	(Finland) Myhinpää 2 (Power Stage)	14.13 km	(France) Sébastien Ogier (France) Julien Ingrassia	1	(Germany) Volkswagen Motorsport	6:16.1	(Finland) Jari-Matti Latvala (Finland) Miikka Anttila
