= 2015 Tour de Corse =

Eleventh round of the 2015 World Rally Championship

2015 Tour de Corse 58ème Tour de Corse
Round 11 of the 2015 World Rally Championship season
| ← Previous event | Next event → |
- Host country: France
- Rally base: Ajaccio, France
- Dates run: October 1 – October 4, 2015
- Stages: 9 (332.73 km; 206.75 miles)
- Stage surface: Tarmac

Overall results
- Overall winner: (Finland) Jari-Matti Latvala (Finland) Miikka Anttila (Germany) Volkswagen Motorsport

The 2015 Tour de Corse (formally the 58ème Tour de Corse) was the eleventh round of the 2015 World Rally Championship. The race was held over four days between 1 October and 4 October 2015, and operated out of Ajaccio, Corsica, France. Volkswagen's Jari-Matti Latvala won the race, his 15th win in the World Rally Championship.

This is the most recent World Rally Championship event to have more than 100 starters.

== Special stages ==
| Day | Stage number | Stage name | Length | Stage winner | | Car No. | Team | Time | Avg. spd. | Rally leader |
|---|---|---|---|---|---|---|---|---|---|---|
| 2 October | SS1 | (France) Plage du Liamone - Sarrola-Carcopino | 29.12 km | (France) Sébastien Ogier (France) Julien Ingrassia | | 1 | (Germany) Volkswagen Motorsport | 19:44.0 | | (France) Sébastien Ogier (France) Julien Ingrassia / (Poland) Robert Kubica (Poland) Maciek Szczepaniak |
| 2 October | SS1 | (France) Plage du Liamone - Sarrola-Carcopino | 29.12 km | (Poland) Robert Kubica (Poland) Maciek Szczepaniak | | 14 | (Poland) Robert Kubica | 19:44.0 | | (France) Sébastien Ogier (France) Julien Ingrassia / (Poland) Robert Kubica (Poland) Maciek Szczepaniak |
| 2 October | SS2 | (France) Casamozza- Ponte Leccia 1 | 43.69 km | Stage cancelled | | | | | | (France) Sébastien Ogier (France) Julien Ingrassia / (Poland) Robert Kubica (Poland) Maciek Szczepaniak |
| 2 October | SS3 | (France) Francardo - Sermano 1 | 36.43 km | (United Kingdom) Elfyn Evans (United Kingdom) Daniel Barritt | | 5 | (United Kingdom) M-Sport World Rally Team | 26:48.5 | | (United Kingdom) Elfyn Evans (United Kingdom) Daniel Barritt |
| 3 October | SS4 | (France) Casamozza- Ponte Leccia 2 | 43.69 km | Stage cancelled | | | | | | (United Kingdom) Elfyn Evans (United Kingdom) Daniel Barritt |
| 3 October | SS5 | (France) Francardo - Sermano 2 | 36.43 km | (Finland) Jari-Matti Latvala (Finland) Miikka Anttila | | 2 | (Germany) Volkswagen Motorsport | 26:50.5 | | (United Kingdom) Elfyn Evans (United Kingdom) Daniel Barritt |
| 3 October | SS6 | (France) Muracciole - Col de Sorba | 48.46 km | (France) Sébastien Ogier (France) Julien Ingrassia | | 1 | (Germany) Volkswagen Motorsport | 28:14.2 | | (Finland) Jari-Matti Latvala (Finland) Miikka Anttila |
| 4 October | SS7 | (France) Sotta - Chialza | 36.71 km | (France) Sébastien Ogier (France) Julien Ingrassia | | 1 | (Germany) Volkswagen Motorsport | 21:14.6 | | (Finland) Jari-Matti Latvala (Finland) Miikka Anttila |
| 4 October | SS8 | (France) Zerubia - Martini | 41.46 km | (Spain) Dani Sordo (Spain) Marc Martí | | 8 | (Germany) Hyundai Motorsport | 25:21.4 | | (Finland) Jari-Matti Latvala (Finland) Miikka Anttila |
| 4 October | Power Stage | | | | | | | | | (Finland) Jari-Matti Latvala (Finland) Miikka Anttila |
| 4 October | SS9 | (France) Bisinao - Agosta Plage | 16.74 km | 1 | (France) Sébastien Ogier (France) Julien Ingrassia | 1 | (Germany) Volkswagen Motorsport | 10:23.2 | | (Finland) Jari-Matti Latvala (Finland) Miikka Anttila |
| 4 October | SS9 | (France) Bisinao - Agosta Plage | 16.74 km | 2 | (Poland) Robert Kubica (Poland) Maciek Szczepaniak | 14 | (Poland) Robert Kubica | 10:31.8 | | (Finland) Jari-Matti Latvala (Finland) Miikka Anttila |
| 4 October | SS9 | (France) Bisinao - Agosta Plage | 16.74 km | 3 | (Finland) Jari-Matti Latvala (Finland) Miikka Anttila | 2 | (Germany) Volkswagen Motorsport | 10:33.4 | | (Finland) Jari-Matti Latvala (Finland) Miikka Anttila |
