= René Kuipers =

Dutch rally driver (born 1960)

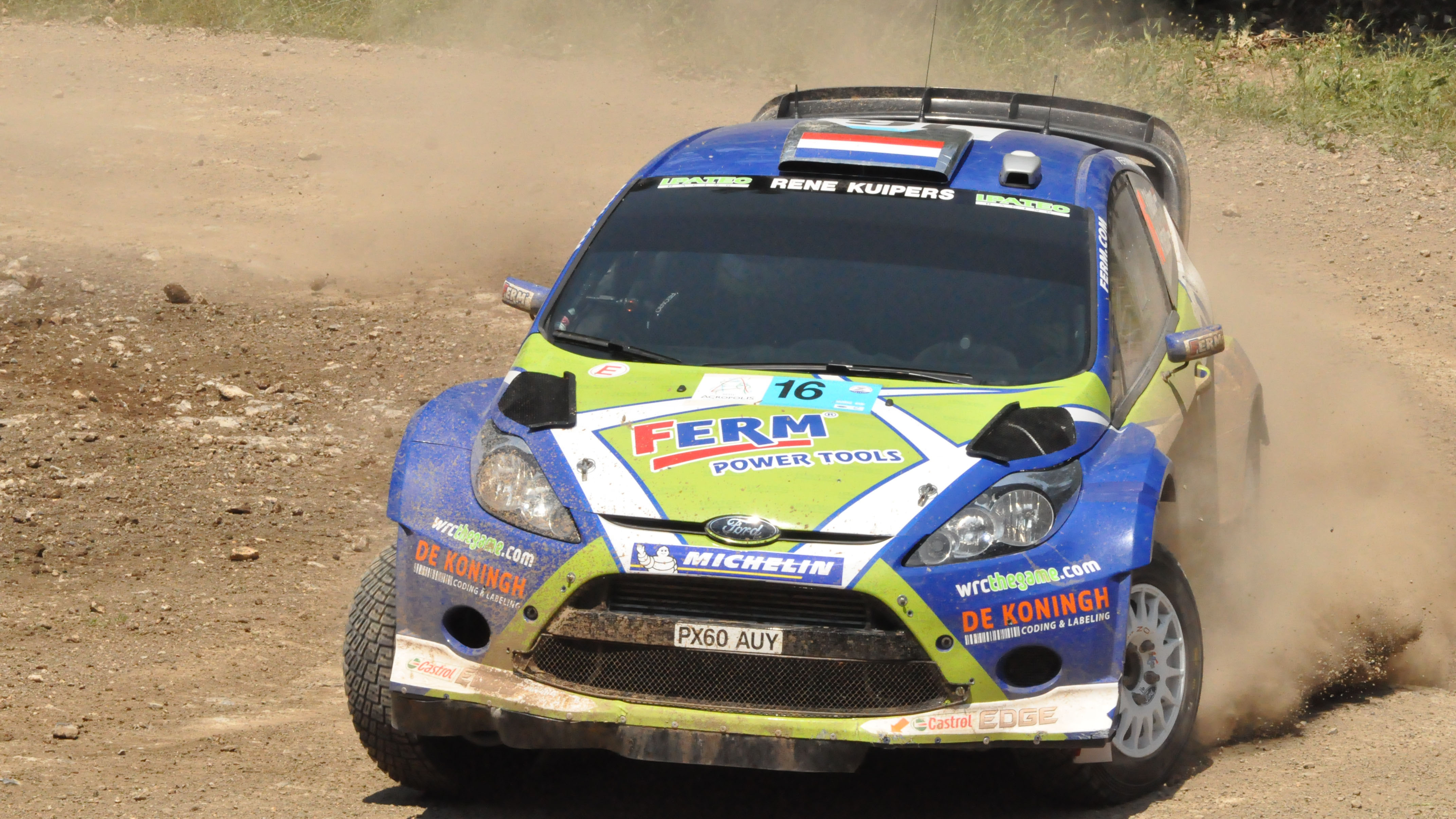

Personal information
- Nationality: (Netherlands) Dutch
- Born: 2 February 1960 (age 66)

World Rally Championship record
- Years active: 2000, 2007–2011
- Co-driver: (Netherlands) Maurice Lammersen (Belgium) Erwin Mombaerts (Netherlands) Erwin Berkhof (Netherlands) Kees Hagman (Netherlands) Annemieke Hulzebos (Belgium) Robin Buysmans
- Teams: Ipatec Racing, Ferm Power Tools World Rally Team
- Rallies: 15
- Championships: 0
- Rally wins: 0
- Podiums: 0
- Stage wins: 0
- Total points: 0
- First rally: 2000 Rally GB
- Last rally: 2011 Rallye Deutschland

René Kuipers (born 2 February 1960) is a Dutch rally driver.

== Complete WRC results ==
Year	Entrant	Car	1	2	3	4	5	6	7	8	9	10	11	12	13	14	15	16	WDC	Points
2000	René Kuipers	Mitsubishi Lancer Evo	MON	SWE	KEN	POR	ESP	ARG	GRE	NZL	FIN	CYP	FRA	ITA	AUS	GBR; 48			-	0
2007	René Kuipers	Subaru Impreza WRC	MON	SWE	NOR	MEX	POR	ARG	ITA	GRE	FIN	GER; 46	NZL	ESP	FRA	JPN	IRE	GBR; 37	-	0
2008	René Kuipers	Ford Focus RS WRC 07	MON	SWE	MEX	ARG	JOR	ITA	GRE	TUR	FIN	GER; Ret	NZL	ESP	FRA	JPN	GBR		-	0
2009	Ipatec Racing	Ford Focus RS WRC 06	IRE	NOR	CYP	POR; Ret	ARG	ITA	GRE	POL	FIN	AUS	ESP	GBR; 24					-	0
2010	Ipatec Racing	Subaru Impreza WRC 08	SWE; 39	MEX	JOR	TUR	NZL				GER; 25	JPN	FRA	ESP	GBR; 24				-	0
2010	Ipatec Racing	Ford Focus RS WRC 06						POR; 31	BUL	FIN									-	0
2011	FERM Power Tools World Rally Team	Ford Fiesta S2000	SWE; 29	MEX	POR	JOR	ITA; 25	ARG											NC	0
2011	FERM Power Tools World Rally Team	Ford Fiesta RS WRC							GRE; 17	FIN; Ret	GER; Ret	AUS	FRA	ESP	GBR				NC	0
