= Ferm Power Tools World Rally Team =

2011 rallying team, 5th place finisher in the 2011 World Rally Championship

Ferm WRT
- Full name: Ferm Power Tools Ford World Rally Team
- Base: Cumbria, England, United Kingdom
- Team principal(s): Malcolm Wilson
- Drivers: (Netherlands) Dennis Kuipers
- Co-drivers: (Belgium) Frederic Miclotte
- Chassis: Ford Fiesta RS WRC
- Tyres: Michelin

World Rally Championship history
- Debut: 2010
- Manufacturers' Championships: 0
- Drivers' Championships: 0
- Rally wins: 0

FERM Power Tools World Rally Team is a Dutch rally team competing in the World Rally Championship. The team was formed in January 2011 for driver Dennis Kuipers's step up to the top level of rallying. The team is working in partnership with the British M-Sport operation, who run the Ford World Rally Team. The team takes its name from Ferm, a Dutch producer of electronic equipment and tools, based in Zwolle. The company is using the WRC to help promote its brand and products throughout the world. The team registered as a WRC Team, meaning it is eligible for manufacturers' championship points.

== History ==
Since 2008 Kuipers had been competing in selected World Rally Championship events for the Ipatec Racing team with his father René Kuipers. For 2010 Dennis competed in eight WRC rounds in a Ford Fiesta S2000 entered by the Stobart M-Sport Ford Rally Team.

On 30 November 2010 it was announced that Kuipers would drive a Ford Fiesta RS WRC in the 2011 World Rally Championship season, run by Ipatec Racing in conjunction with M-Sport. On 10 January 2011 it was announced that the FERM Power Tools World Rally Team would be created for the new programme.

=== 2011 season ===
The FERM Power Tools World Rally Team made its debut at the 2011 Rally Sweden. Kuipers finished the rally in 13th position, enough to give the team four manufacturer points.

== WRC results ==
Year	Car	No	Driver	1	2	3	4	5	6	7	8	9	10	11	12	13	WDC	Points	TC	Points
2011	Ford Fiesta RS WRC	9	(Netherlands) Dennis Kuipers	SWE; 13	MEX; Ret	POR; 10	JOR; 9	ITA; Ret	ARG	GRE; 10	FIN; 11	GER; 10	AUS	FRA; 5	ESP; 9	GBR; 8	12th	21	6th	44
2011	Ford Fiesta RS WRC	18	(Netherlands) René Kuipers							GRE; 17	FIN; Ret	GER; Ret	AUS	FRA	ESP	GBR	NC	0	6th	44
2011	Ford Fiesta S2000	18	(Netherlands) René Kuipers	SWE; 29	MEX	POR	JOR	ITA; 25	ARG								NC	0	6th	44
