= Bernardo Sousa (rally driver) =

Portuguese rally driver (born 1987)

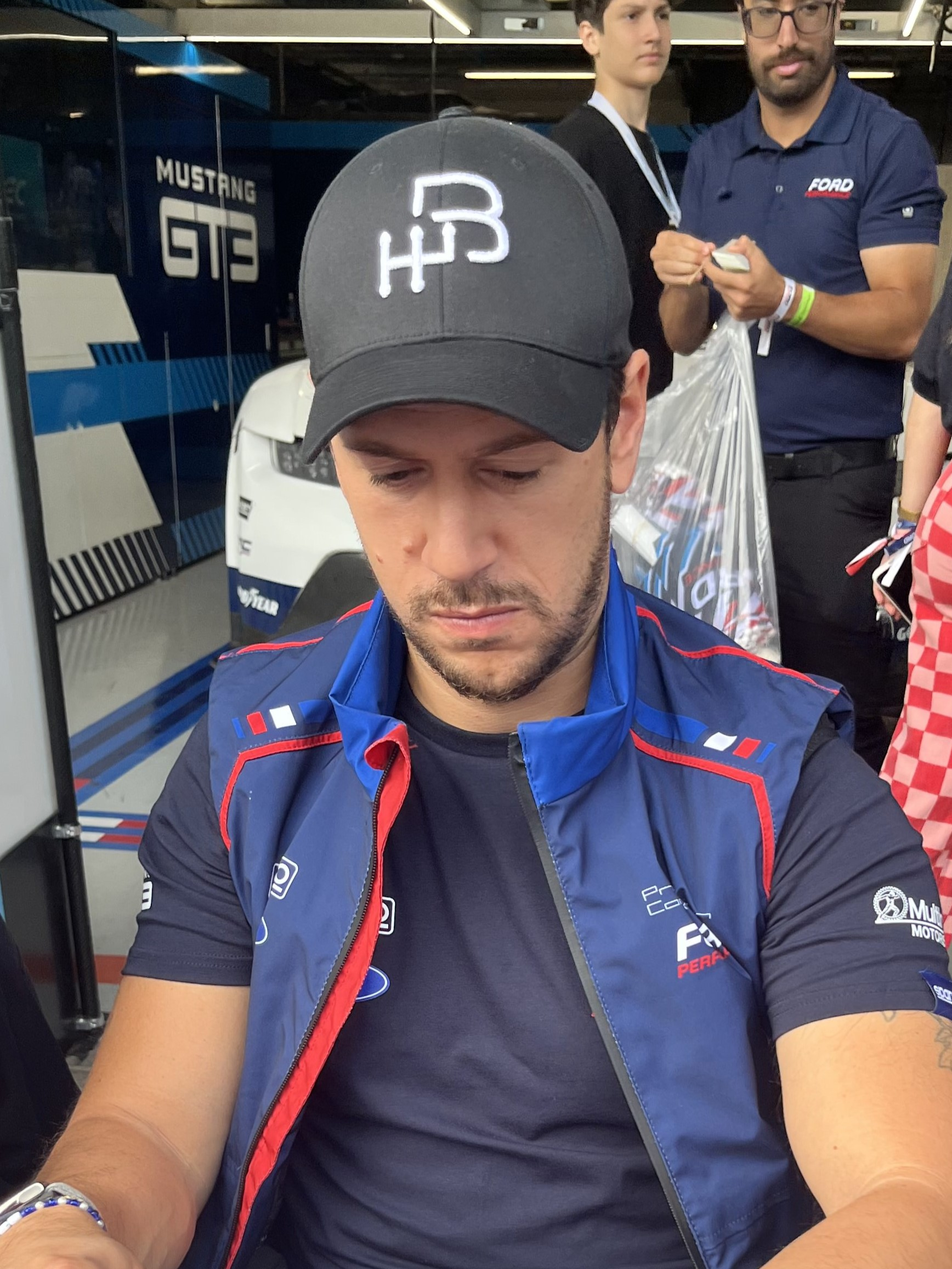
- Sousa at the 2025 6 Hours of São Paulo

Personal information
- Nationality: (Portugal) Portuguese
- Full name: Tomas Bernardo Rodrigues Sousa
- Born: 16 May 1987 (age 39); Madeira, Portugal

World Rally Championship record
- Years active: 2007–2011, 2014–2016
- Co-driver: (Portugal) Paulo Babo (Portugal) Carlos Magalhães (Portugal) Jorge Carvalho (Portugal) Nuno Rodrigues da Silva (Portugal) António Costa (Portugal) Hugo Magalhães
- Rallies: 40
- Championships: 0
- Rally wins: 0
- Podiums: 0
- Stage wins: 0
- Total points: 1
- First rally: 2007 Rally de Portugal
- Last rally: 2016 Rally Finland

24 Hours of Le Mans career
- Years: 2025
- Teams: Proton
- Best finish: 41st (2025)
- Class wins: 0
- Categorisation: FIA Bronze

Tomas Bernardo Rodrigues Sousa (born 16 May 1987) is a Portuguese rally driver.

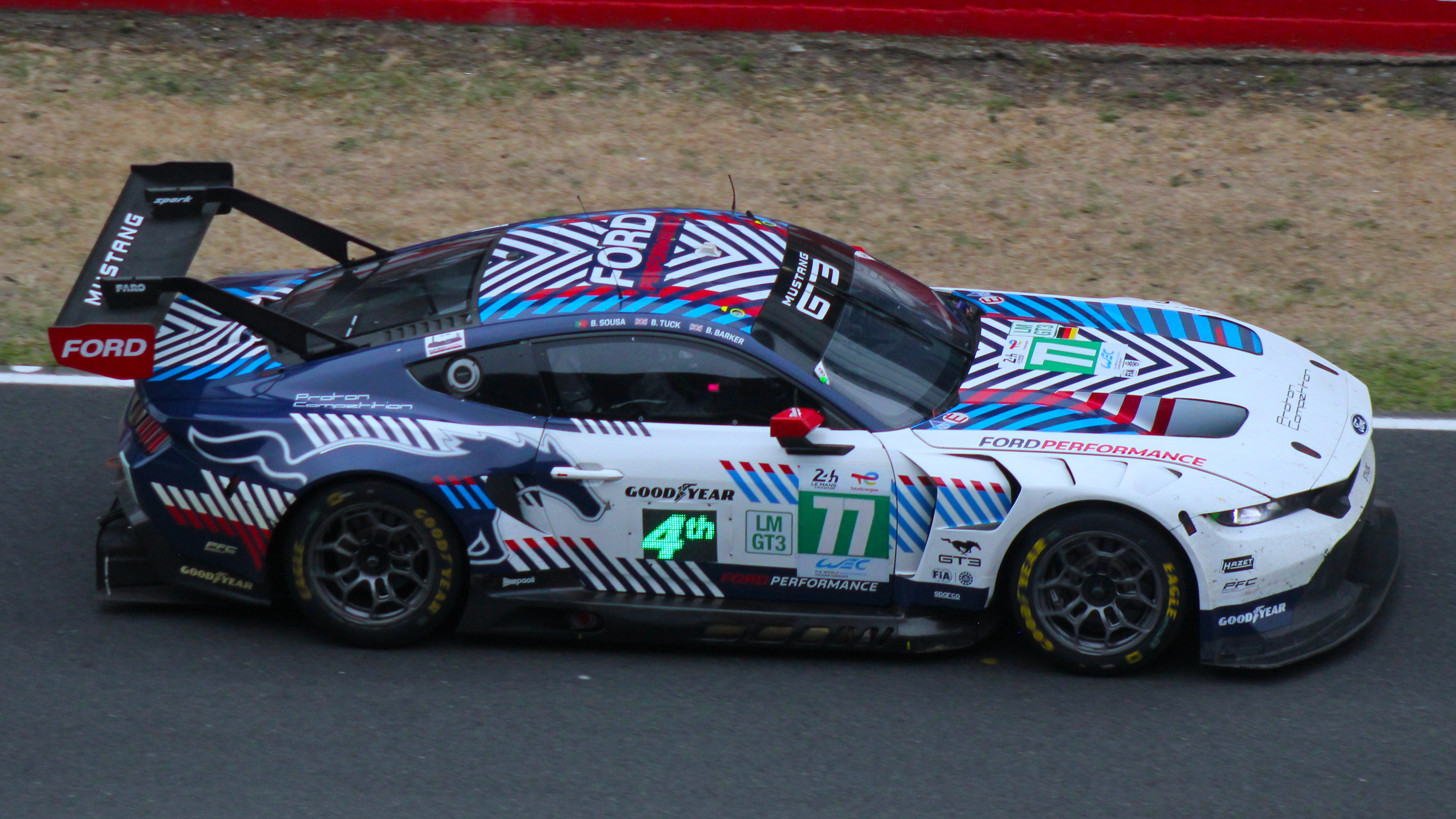
Sousa's No. 77 car at the 2025 24 Hours of Le Mans

Born in Madeira, Portugal, and having previously competed in karting, Sousa began his rally career in 2006, competing in the Portuguese national championship. In 2008, he began competing in the Production World Rally Championship (P-WRC), a class of the World Rally Championship. He finished second in class on the 2008 Acropolis Rally, finishing the season ninth in the P-WRC standings. In 2009, he switched from a Mitsubishi Lancer Evolution IX to an Abarth Grande Punto, finishing the season in tenth. In 2010, he moved to the new Super 2000 World Rally Championship (S-WRC) in a Ford Fiesta S2000, winning his class in his first rally in the S2000, the 2011 Jordan Rally.

== Racing record ==
=== WRC results ===
Year	Entrant	Car	1	2	3	4	5	6	7	8	9	10	11	12	13	14	15	16	WDC	Pts
2007	Bernardo Sousa	Mitsubishi Lancer Evolution IX	MON	SWE	NOR	MEX	POR; Ret	ARG	ITA	GRE	FIN	GER	NZL	ESP	FRA	JPN	IRE	GBR	NC	0
2008	Red Bull Rallye Team	Mitsubishi Lancer Evolution IX	MON	SWE; 19	MEX	ARG; 18	JOR	ITA	GRE; 15	TUR; 24		GER	NZL; 18	ESP	FRA	JPN	GBR; 31		NC	0
2008	Bernardo Sousa	Mitsubishi Lancer Evolution IX									FIN; DNS								NC	0
2009	Bernardo Sousa	Abarth Grande Punto S2000	IRE	NOR; Ret	CYP	POR; DNS	ARG	ITA; Ret	GRE; 16	POL	FIN	AUS; Ret	ESP	GBR; 15					NC	0
2010	Bernardo Sousa	Ford Fiesta S2000	SWE; 19	MEX	JOR; EX	TUR	NZL												NC	0
2010	Team Ford/Quinta Do Lorde	Ford Fiesta S2000						POR; 15	BUL	FIN	GER; 32	JPN; Ret	FRA; 32	ESP	GBR; Ret				NC	0
2011	Team Quinta do Lorde	Ford Fiesta RS WRC	SWE	MEX	POR; Ret														28th	1
2011	Team Quinta do Lorde	Ford Fiesta S2000				JOR; 10	ITA; Ret	ARG	GRE; 11	FIN; 24	GER; 35	AUS	FRA; 15	ESP; Ret	GBR				28th	1
2014	Bernardo Sousa	Ford Fiesta RRC	MON	SWE	MEX	POR; 15	ARG	ITA; 15	POL; 16	FIN	GER; Ret	AUS	FRA; 17	ESP; Ret	GBR; Ret				NC	0
2015	ACSM Rallye Team	Peugeot 208 T16	MON	SWE	MEX	ARG	POR; Ret	ITA; Ret	POL; Ret	FIN	GER	AUS	FRA	ESP	GBR				NC	0
2016	Bernardo Sousa	Ford Fiesta R2T	MON	SWE	MEX	ARG	POR; Ret	ITA	POL; 33	FIN; 35	GER	CHN	FRA	ESP	GBR	AUS			NC	0

==== PWRC results ====
Year	Entrant	Car	1	2	3	4	5	6	7	8	Pos.	Pts
2008	Red Bull Rallye Team	Mitsubishi Lancer Evo IX	SWE; 8	ARG; 8	GRE; 2	TUR; 11	FIN	NZL; 7	JPN	GBR; 9	9th	12
2009	Bernardo Sousa	Fiat Abarth Grande Punto S2000	NOR; Ret	CYP	POR; DNS	ARG	ITA; Ret	GRE; 5	AUS; Ret	GBR; 4	10th	9

==== SWRC results ====
Year	Entrant	Car	1	2	3	4	5	6	7	8	9	10	Pos.	Pts
2010	Bernardo Sousa	Ford Fiesta S2000	SWE; 6	MEX	JOR; EX								8th	32
2010	Team Ford/Quinta Do Lorde	Ford Fiesta S2000				NZL	POR; 4	FIN	GER; 7	JPN; Ret	FRA; 7	GBR; Ret	8th	32
2011	Team Quinta do Lorde	Ford Fiesta S2000	MEX	JOR; 1	ITA; Ret	GRE; 2	FIN; 6	GER; 8	FRA; 4	ESP; Ret			4th	67

==== WRC 2 results ====
Year	Entrant	Car	1	2	3	4	5	6	7	8	9	10	11	12	13	Pos.	Pts
2014	Bernardo Sousa	Ford Fiesta RRC	MON	SWE	MEX	POR; 5	ARG	ITA; 5	POL; 5	FIN	GER; Ret	AUS	FRA; 2	ESP; Ret	GBR; Ret	8th	48
2015	ACSM Rallye Team	Peugeot 208 T16	MON	SWE	MEX	ARG	POR; Ret	ITA; Ret	POL; Ret	FIN	GER	AUS	FRA	ESP	GBR	-	0

=== Drive DMACK Cup results ===
Year	Entrant	Car	1	2	3	4	5	Pos.	Pts
2016	Bernardo Sousa	Ford Fiesta R2T	POR; Ret	POL; 3	FIN; 2	GER	ESP	5th	47

=== IRC results ===
Year	Entrant	Car	1	2	3	4	5	6	7	8	9	10	11	12	WDC	Pts
2006	(Portugal) C.S. Maritimo - Coral Sá - P.S.Line	Peugeot 206 S1600	RSA	YPR	MAD; 51	ITA									NC	0
2007	(Portugal) Team C.S. Maritimo	Mitsubishi Lancer Evo IX	KEN	TUR	BEL	RUS	POR; Ret	CZE	ITA	SWI	CHI				-	0
2008	(Portugal) Bernardo Sousa	Mitsubishi Lancer Evo IX	TUR	POR; Ret	BEL	RUS	POR	CZE	ESP	ITA	SWI	CHI			NC	0
2009	(Portugal) Bernardo Sousa	Fiat Grande Punto Abarth S2000	MON	BRA	KEN	POR; 10	BEL	RUS	POR; Ret	CZE	ESP	ITA	SCO		NC	0
2010	(Portugal) Team Ford/Quinta do Lord	Ford Fiesta S2000	MON	BRA	ARG	CAN	ITA	BEL	AZO; 10	MAD; Ret	CZE	ITA	SCO	CYP	NC	0

=== 24 Hours of Le Mans results ===
Year	Team	Co-Drivers	Car	Class	Laps	Pos.	Class Pos.
2025	(Germany) Proton Competition	(United Kingdom) Ben Barker (United Kingdom) Ben Tuck	Ford Mustang GT3	LMGT3	338	41st	9th

=== Complete Asian Le Mans Series results ===
(key) (Races in bold indicate pole position) (Races in italics indicate fastest lap)

Year	Team	Class	Car	Engine	1	2	3	4	5	6	Pos.	Points
2025–26	Proton Competition	LMP2	Oreca 07	Gibson GK428 4.2 L V8	SEP; 1; 16	SEP; 2; 11	DUB; 1	DUB; 2	ABU; 1	ABU; 2	13th*	0*

== Big Brother ==
In 2022, Sousa entered the reality show Big Brother Famosos 2022 II as a rally driver, and he ended up winning it after 57 days.
