= Albert Llovera =

Andorran skier and rally driver (born 1966)

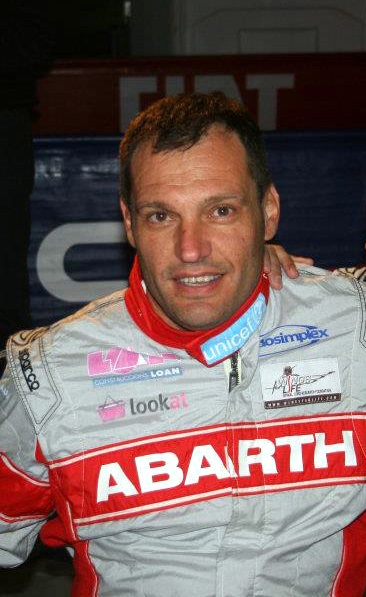
- Llovera during 2011 Rally Catalunya.

Personal information
- Nationality: Andorran
- Full name: Albert Llovera Massana
- Born: 11 September 1966 (age 60)

World Rally Championship record
- Years active: 2001 – 2002, 2005–2006, 2008–2012
- Co-driver: (Spain) Marc Corral (Spain) Lucas Cruz (Spain) Diego Vallejo (Spain) Borja Rozada (Spain) Marc Martí
- Rallies: 29
- Championships: 0
- Rally wins: 0
- Podiums: 0
- Stage wins: 0
- Total points: 0
- First rally: 2001 Rally Catalunya
- Last rally: 2012 Rally Catalunya
- Last updated on: 20 July 2018.

Albert Llovera Massana (Note: In this Catalan name, the first or paternal surname is Llovera and the second or maternal family name is Massana; both are generally joined by the conjunction "i".) (born 11 September 1966) is an Andorran rally driver and former alpine skier. He became the youngest athlete to compete in the Winter Olympics in 1984 at the age of 17. A serious accident in 1985 left him paralysed from the waist down. He has since taken up rallying, using cars with specially adapted hand controls. He is currently competing in the Super 2000 World Rally Championship.

== Career ==
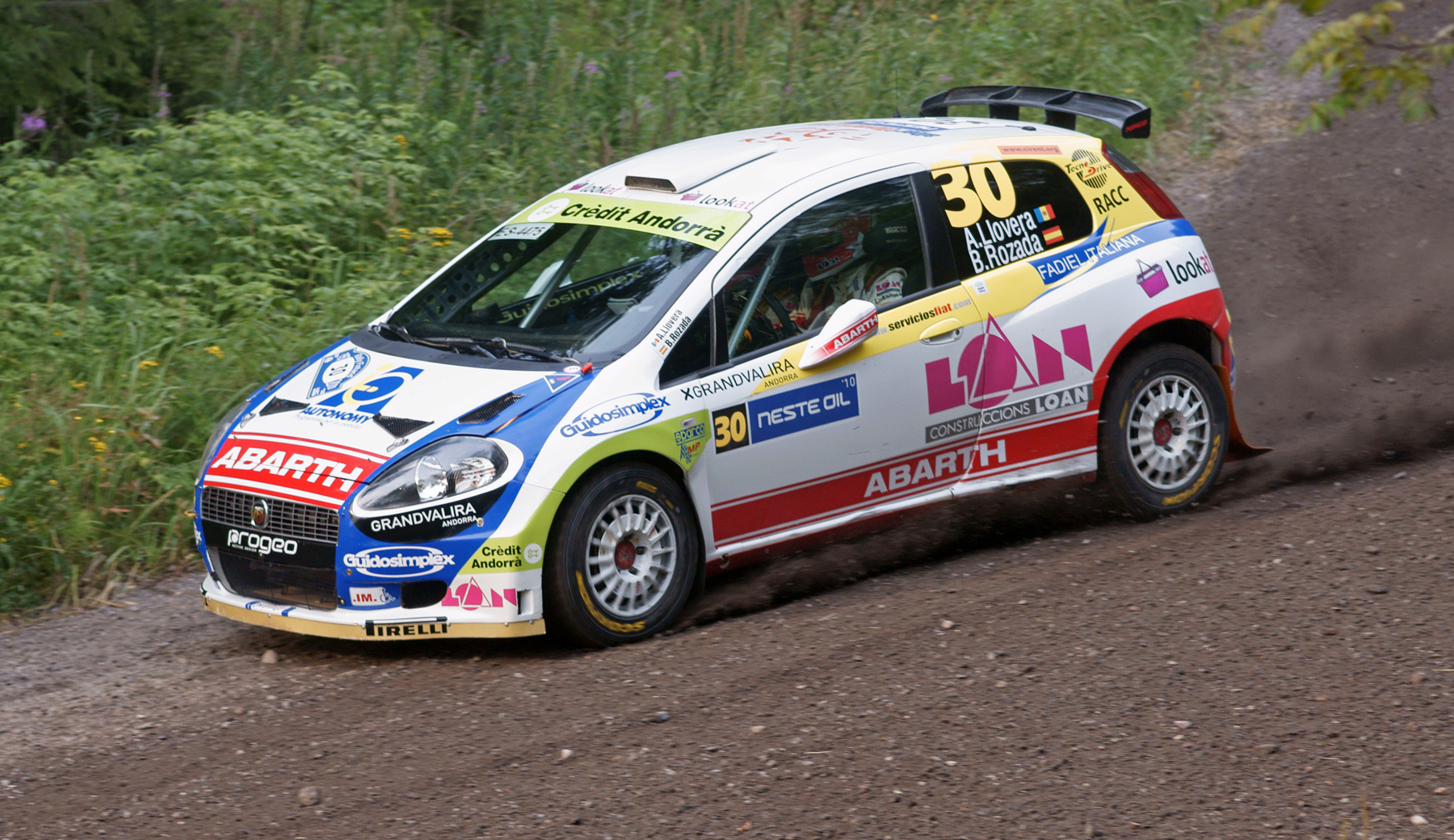
Llovera during 2010 Rally Finland.

At the age of 17, Llovera became the youngest ever athlete to compete in the Winter Olympics when he represented Andorra at the 1984 games in Sarajevo, Yugoslavia. In the following year, 1985, whilst competing in the European Ski Cup, also in Sarajevo, he suffered a serious accident which left him using a wheelchair with paraplegia beginning at lower back level.

Llovera turned to motorsport, first competing on quad bikes and then starting in rallying. In 1989, he won the Peugeot Rally Cup in Andorra. In 2001, with the support of Fiat, he began competing in the Junior World Rally Championship in a Fiat Punto S1600. He continued in the championship in 2002.

After competing in Spain along with selected WRC appearances, Llovera returned full-time to the world stage in 2010 to contest the Super 2000 World Rally Championship in a Fiat Abarth Grande Punto S2000. He finished fifth in class on his first event Rally Mexico. He scored a best overall result of 17th on Rally Catalunya, which was not a round of the SWRC.

Llovera continued in the SWRC in 2011, finishing fourth in the category in Jordan.

In 2020, Llovera competed in the Dakar rally in an Iveco truck from the Dutch Team de Rooy.

== Complete WRC results ==
Year	Entrant	Car	1	2	3	4	5	6	7	8	9	10	11	12	13	14	15	16	WDC	Points
2001	Pronto Racing	Fiat Punto S1600	MON	SWE	POR	ESP; Ret	ARG	CYP	GRE; Ret	KEN	FIN; 79	NZL	ITA; Ret	FRA; 39	AUS	GBR; Ret			NC	0
2002	Albert Llovera	Fiat Punto S1600	MON; Ret	SWE	FRA	ESP; 33	CYP	ARG	GRE; Ret	KEN	FIN	GER; Ret	ITA; 33	NZL	AUS	GBR			NC	0
2005	Albert Llovera	Mitsubishi Lancer Evo VIII	MON	SWE	MEX	NZL	ITA	CYP	TUR	GRE	ARG	FIN; 32	GER	GBR	JPN	FRA	ESP	AUS	NC	0
2006	Albert Llovera	Mitsubishi Lancer Evo VIII	MON	SWE	MEX	ESP; 36	FRA	ARG	ITA	GRE	GER	FIN; 54	JPN	CYP	TUR	AUS	NZL	GBR	NC	0
2008	Albert Llovera	Fiat Abarth Grande Punto S2000	MON	SWE	MEX	ARG	JOR	ITA	GRE	TUR	FIN	GER	NZL	ESP; Ret	FRA	JPN	GBR		NC	0
2009	PCR Sport	Fiat Abarth Grande Punto S2000	IRE	NOR	CYP	POR	ARG	ITA	GRE	POL	FIN	AUS	ESP; 42	GBR					NC	0
2010	Albert Llovera	Fiat Abarth Grande Punto S2000	SWE	MEX; 22	JOR	TUR	NZL; Ret	POR; 41	BUL	FIN; Ret	GER; 35	JPN	FRA; 47	ESP; 17	GBR				NC	0
2011	Albert Llovera	Fiat Abarth Grande Punto S2000	SWE	MEX	POR	JOR; 17	ITA; Ret	ARG	GRE; 24	FIN; Ret	GER; Ret	AUS	FRA; DNS	ESP; 40	GBR				NC	0
2012	PCR Sport	Fiat Abarth Grande Punto S2000	MON	SWE	MEX	POR	ARG	GRE	NZL	FIN	GER	GBR	FRA	ITA	ESP; Ret				NC	0

=== JWRC Results ===
Year	Entrant	Car	1	2	3	4	5	6	JWRC	Points
2001	Pronto Racing	Fiat Punto S1600	ESP; Ret	GRE; Ret	FIN; 7	ITA; Ret	FRA; 13	GBR; Ret	NC	0
2002	Albert Llovera	Fiat Punto S1600	MON; Ret	ESP; 12	GRE; Ret	GER; Ret	ITA; 16	GBR	NC	0

=== SWRC results ===
Year	Entrant	Car	1	2	3	4	5	6	7	8	9	10	SWRC	Points
2010	Albert Llovera	Fiat Abarth Grande Punto S2000	SWE	MEX; 5	JOR	NZL; Ret	POR; 10	FIN; Ret	GER; 8	JPN	FRA; 9	GBR	13th	17
2011	Albert Llovera	Fiat Abarth Grande Punto S2000	MEX	JOR; 4	ITA; Ret	GRE; 9	FIN; Ret	GER; Ret	FRA	ESP; 8			10th	18
2012	PCR Sport	Fiat Abarth Grande Punto S2000	MON	SWE	POR	NZL	FIN	GBR	FRA	ESP; Ret			NC	0
