= 2011 Rally Finland =

Motor rally competition

2011 Rally Finland 2011 Neste Oil Rally Finland
Round 8 of the 2011 World Rally Championship season
← Previous event	Next event →
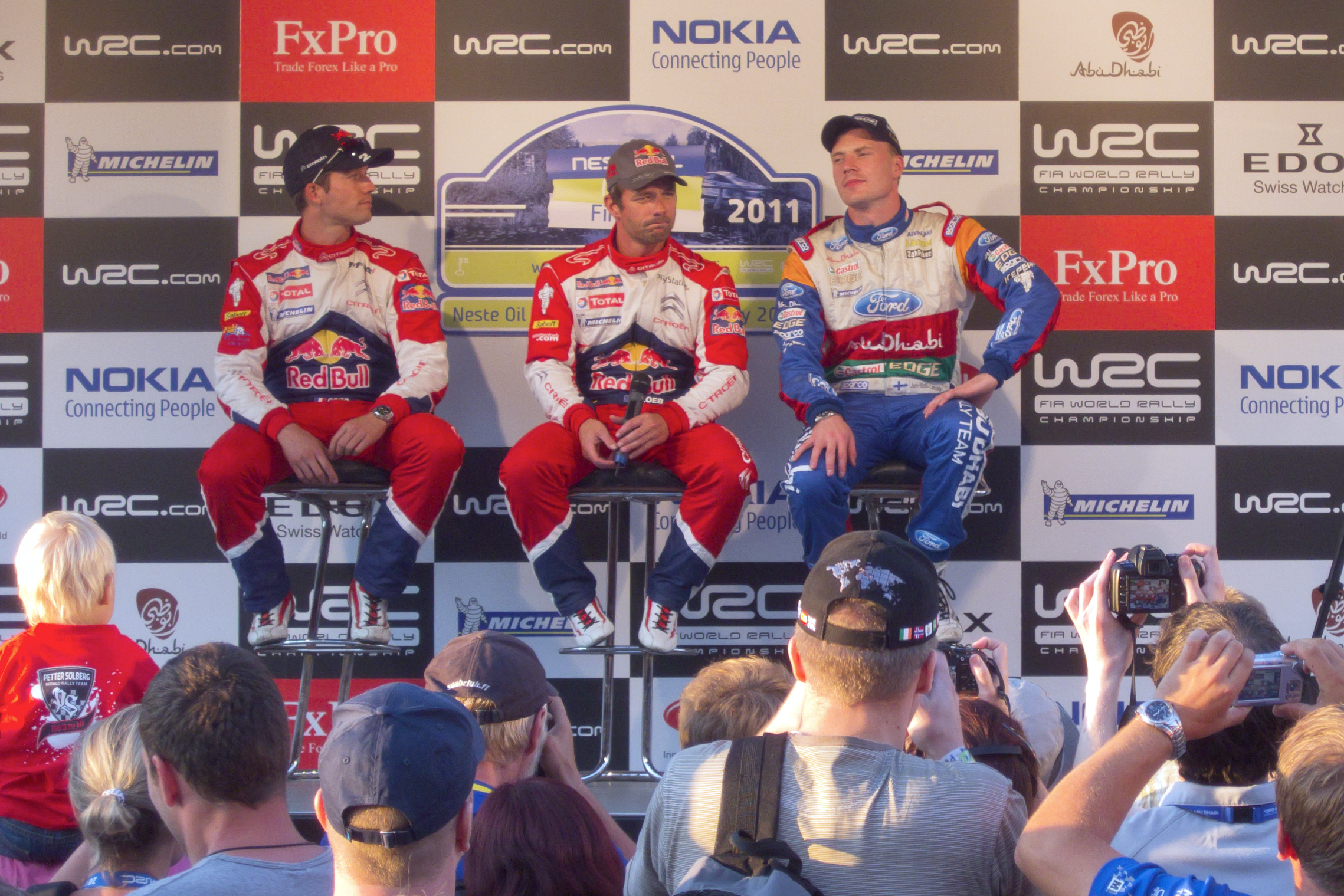
- Sébastien Ogier, Sébastien Loeb and Jari-Matti Latvala being interviewed at the end of day 1.
- Host country: Finland
- Rally base: Jyväskylä, Finland
- Dates run: July 28 – 30 2011
- Stages: 22 (314.39 km; 195.35 miles)
- Stage surface: Gravel
- Overall distance: 1,355.21 km (842.09 miles)

Statistics
- Crews: 125 at start, 66 at finish

Overall results
- Overall winner: (France) Sébastien Loeb (France) Citroën World Rally Team

The 2011 Rally Finland was the eighth round of the 2011 World Rally Championship season. The rally took place over 28–30 July, and was based in Jyväskylä, with a remote service in Lahti. The rally was also the fifth round of the Super 2000 World Rally Championship, the fourth round of the Production World Rally Championship and the third round of the WRC Academy.

Championship leader Sébastien Loeb won for the second time in Finland, taking his 66th career victory in the process, ahead of rivals Jari-Matti Latvala, Sébastien Ogier and Mikko Hirvonen. With an overall tenth place, Juho Hänninen took the honours in SWRC, Hayden Paddon took his third consecutive win in PWRC, and Egon Kaur continued his perfect record in WRC Academy.

== Entry list ==
No.	Driver	Co-driver	Entrant	Car	Class
1	(France) Sébastien Loeb	(Monaco) Daniel Elena	(France) Citroën Total World Rally Team	Citroën DS3 WRC	WRC
2	(France) Sébastien Ogier	(France) Julien Ingrassia	(France) Citroën Total World Rally Team	Citroën DS3 WRC	WRC
3	(Finland) Mikko Hirvonen	(Finland) Jarmo Lehtinen	(United Kingdom) Ford Abu Dhabi World Rally Team	Ford Fiesta RS WRC	WRC
4	(Finland) Jari-Matti Latvala	(Finland) Miikka Anttila	(United Kingdom) Ford Abu Dhabi World Rally Team	Ford Fiesta RS WRC	WRC
5	(United Kingdom) Matthew Wilson	(United Kingdom) Scott Martin	(United Kingdom) M-Sport Stobart Ford World Rally Team	Ford Fiesta RS WRC	WRC
6	(Norway) Mads Østberg	(Sweden) Jonas Andersson	(United Kingdom) M-Sport Stobart Ford World Rally Team	Ford Fiesta RS WRC	WRC
8	(Finland) Kimi Räikkönen	(Finland) Kaj Lindström	(Finland) ICE 1 Racing	Citroën DS3 WRC	WRC
9	(Netherlands) Dennis Kuipers	(Belgium) Frédéric Miclotte	(Netherlands) Ferm Powertools World Rally Team	Ford Fiesta RS WRC	WRC
10	(United Arab Emirates) Khalid Al-Qassimi	(United Kingdom) Michael Orr	(United Arab Emirates) Team Abu Dhabi	Ford Fiesta RS WRC	WRC
11	(Norway) Petter Solberg	(United Kingdom) Chris Patterson	(Norway) Petter Solberg World Rally Team	Citroën DS3 WRC	WRC
12	(Brazil) Daniel Oliveira	(Portugal) Carlos Magalhães	Brazil World Rally Team	MINI John Cooper Works WRC	WRC
15	(Norway) Henning Solberg	(Austria) Ilka Minor	(United Kingdom) M-Sport Stobart Ford World Rally Team	Ford Fiesta RS WRC	WRC
16	(Russia) Evgeny Novikov	(France) Denis Giraudet	(United Kingdom) M-Sport Stobart Ford World Rally Team	Ford Fiesta RS WRC	WRC
17	(Portugal) Armindo Araújo	(Portugal) Miguel Ramalho	(Italy) Motorsport Italia	MINI John Cooper Works WRC	WRC
18	(Finland) Matti Rantanen	(Finland) Mikko Lukka	(Finland) Matti Rantanen	MINI John Cooper Works WRC	WRC
19	(Finland) Jari Ketomaa	(Finland) Mika Stenberg	(Finland) HJ-Autotalo.com	Ford Fiesta RS WRC	WRC
20	(Finland) Janne Tuohino	(Finland) Risto Pietiläinen	(Finland) Janne Tuohino	Ford Fiesta RS WRC	WRC
21	(Czech Republic) Martin Prokop	(Czech Republic) Jan Tománek	(Czech Republic) Czech Ford National Team	Ford Fiesta S2000	2
22	(Estonia) Ott Tänak	(Estonia) Kuldar Sikk	(Estonia) Ott Tänak	Ford Fiesta S2000	2
24	(Portugal) Bernardo Sousa	(Portugal) Paulo Babo	(Portugal) Team Quinta do Lorde	Ford Fiesta S2000	2
25	(Finland) Juho Hänninen	(Finland) Mikko Markkula	(Austria) Red Bull Škoda	Škoda Fabia S2000	2
26	(Estonia) Karl Kruuda	(Estonia) Martin Järveoja	(Estonia) ME3 Rally Team	Škoda Fabia S2000	2
27	(Germany) Hermann Gassner Jr.	(Germany) Katharina Wüstenhagen	(Austria) Red Bull Škoda	Škoda Fabia S2000	2
28	(Norway) Eyvind Brynildsen	(Norway) Cato Menkerud	(Norway) PS Engineering	Škoda Fabia S2000	2
29	(Hungary) Frigyes Turán	(Hungary) Gábor Zsiros	(Hungary) Turán Motorsport	Ford Fiesta S2000	2
30	(Andorra) Albert Llovera	(Spain) Diego Vallejo	(Andorra) Albert Llovera	Fiat Abarth Grande Punto S2000	2
37	(Spain) Daniel Sordo	(Spain) Carlos Del Barrio	(United Kingdom) Mini WRC Team	MINI John Cooper Works WRC	WRC
49	(Finland) Juha Salo	(Finland) Marko Salminen	(Finland) Juha Salo	Mitsubishi Lancer Evolution X R4	2
50	(Finland) Joonas Lindroos	(Finland) Pasi Kilpeläinen	(Germany) Volkswagen Motorsport	Škoda Fabia S2000	2
51	(Finland) Mattias Therman	(Finland) Janne Perälä	(Finland) Mattias Therman	MINI John Cooper Works WRC	WRC
52	(United Kingdom) Kris Meeke	(Republic of Ireland) Paul Nagle	(United Kingdom) Mini WRC Team	MINI John Cooper Works WRC	WRC
53	(Netherlands) René Kuipers	(Netherlands) Annemieke Hulzebos	(Netherlands) Ferm Powertools World Rally Team	Ford Fiesta RS WRC	WRC
54	(Norway) Andreas Mikkelsen	(Norway) Ola Fløene	(Germany) Volkswagen Motorsport	Škoda Fabia S2000	2
55	(Sweden) Per-Gunnar Andersson	(Sweden) Emil Axelsson	(Sweden) Per-Gunnar Andersson	Subaru Impreza WRX STi R4	2
56	(Finland) Mikko Lehessaari	(Finland) Lassi Hartikainen	(Finland) Mikko Lehessaari	Subaru Impreza WRX STi	3
57	(Finland) Mikko Eskelinen	(Finland) Arto Kapanen	(Finland) Mikko Eskelinen	Mitsubishi Lancer Evolution X	3
58	(Finland) Ari Laivola	(Finland) Kari Mustalahti	(Finland) Ari Laivola	Peugeot 207 S2000	2
59	(Finland) Jani Salomaa	(Finland) Jarno Ottman	(Finland) Jani Salomaa	Mitsubishi Lancer Evolution IX	3
60	(Latvia) Andis Neiksans	(Latvia) Peteris Dzirkals	(Latvia) Andis Neiksans	Mitsubishi Lancer Evolution X	3
61	(Estonia) Sander Pärn	(Estonia) Ken Järveoja	(Estonia) Sander Pärn	Subaru Impreza WRX STi	3
62	(Finland) Antti Lahtinen	(Finland) Tommi Alkula	(Finland) Antti Lahtinen	Mitsubishi Lancer Evolution IX	3
63	(Finland) Mika Turkki	(Finland) Timo Hantunen	(Finland) Mika Turkki	Mitsubishi Lancer Evolution IX	3
64	(Finland) Petri Lehtovirta	(Finland) Juha Kanerva	(Finland) Petri Lehtovirta	Mitsubishi Lancer Evolution IX	3
65	(Netherlands) Kees Burger	(Finland) Miika Teiskonen	(Netherlands) Kees Burger	Subaru Impreza WRX STi	3
66	(Finland) Kari Hämäläinen	(Finland) Aulis Ahonen	(Finland) Kari Hämäläinen	Ford Fiesta S2000	2
67	(Russia) Evgeny Cherkasov	(Finland) Seppo Varmavuo	(Russia) Evgeny Cherkasov	Subaru Impreza WRX STi	3
68	(Finland) Timo Pulkkinen	(Finland) Lasse Miettinen	(Finland) Timo Pulkkinen	Subaru Impreza WRX STi	3
69	(Russia) Radik Shaymiev	(Russia) Maxim Tsvetkov	(Russia) Radik Shaymiev	Peugeot 207 S2000	2
70	(Russia) Nikita Kondrakhin	(Germany) Klaus Wicha	(Russia) Nikita Kondrakhin	Mitsubishi Lancer Evolution IX	3
71	(Finland) Esapekka Lappi	(Finland) Janne Ferm	(Finland) Printsport	Citroën C2 R2	6
72	(Finland) Kalle Pinomäki	(Finland) Matti Kaskinen	(Finland) Kalle Pinomäki	Renault Twingo R2	6
73	(Finland) Jukka Korhonen	(Finland) Mikael Korhonen	(Finland) Jukka Korhonen	Ford Fiesta R2	6
74	(United Kingdom) Elfyn Evans	(United Kingdom) Andrew Edwards	(United Kingdom) Elfyn Evans	Ford Fiesta R2	6
75	(Finland) Tomi Tukiainen	(Finland) Pekka Kärmeniemi	(Finland) Tomi Tukiainen	Citroën C2 R2	6
76	(Finland) Niko-Pekka Nieminen	(Finland) Panu Plosila	(Finland) Niko-Pekka Nieminen	Ford Fiesta R2	6
77	(Estonia) Siim Plangi	(Estonia) Marek Sarapuu	(Estonia) Siim Plangi	Honda Civic Type-R R3	5
78	(Estonia) Martin Kangur	(Estonia) Simo Koskinen	(Estonia) Martin Kangur	Honda Civic Type-R R3	5
79	(Russia) Igor Grushelevskiy	(Russia) Yan Poedinkov	(Russia) Igor Grushelevskiy	Mitsubishi Lancer Evolution IX	3
80	(Finland) Jouni Virtanen	(Finland) Ari-Pekka Hautanen	(Finland) Jouni Virtanen	Subaru Impreza WRX STi	3
81	(Brazil) Paulo Nobre	(Brazil) Edu Paula	(Brazil) Palmeirinha Rally	Mitsubishi Lancer Evolution X R4	2
82	(Finland) Jarmo Komsi	(Finland) Teemu Buckman	(Finland) Jarmo Komsi	Mitsubishi Lancer Evolution IX	3
83	(Finland) Kristian Yritys	(Finland) Janne Siirilä	(Finland) Kristian Yritys	Citroën C2 R2	6
84	(Norway) Frank Tore Larsen	(Norway) Torstein Eriksen	(Norway) Frank Tore Larsen	Ford Fiesta R2	6
85	(Finland) Kristian Kiviniemi	(Finland) Lasse Hirvijärvi	(Finland) Kristian Kiviniemi	Honda Civic Type-R	8
86	(Finland) Niko Veikkanen	(Finland) Hannu Lamminen	(Finland) Niko Veikkanen	Renault Clio Sport	5
87	(Finland) Christoffer Dahlström	(Finland) Kari Kemppinen	(Finland) Christoffer Dahlström	Ford Fiesta R2	6
88	(Finland) Juha Pasanen	(Finland) Jari Jaakola	(Finland) Juha Pasanen	Subaru Impreza WRX STi	3
89	(Sweden) Oscar Ortfeldt	(Sweden) Christer Carlsson	(Sweden) Oscar Ortfeldt	Subaru Impreza WRX STi	3
90	(Hungary) Zoltán Szabó	(Hungary) István Kerék	(Hungary) Zoltán Szabó	Mitsubishi Lancer Evolution IX	3
91	(Italy) Andrea Zivian	(Italy) Nicola Arena	(Italy) Andrea Zivian	Mitsubishi Lancer Evolution IX	3
92	(Russia) Evgeny Shklyaev	(Estonia) Aleksander Kornilov	(Russia) Evgeny Shklyaev	Mitsubishi Lancer Evolution IX	3
93	(Spain) Alexander Villanueva	(Spain) Óscar Sánchez	(Spain) Alexander Villanueva	Mitsubishi Lancer Evolution X	3
94	(Finland) Joni Pakarinen	(Finland) Jori Nousiainen	(Finland) Joni Pakarinen	Mitsubishi Lancer Evolution IX	3
95	(Finland) Ari Kirvesmäki	(Finland) Jukka Jämsen	(Finland) Ari Kirvesmäki	Mitsubishi Lancer Evolution IX	3
96	(Finland) Kari Hytönen	(Germany) Heidi Koppe	(Finland) Kari Hytönen	Ford Fiesta R2	6
97	(Finland) Tomi Weurlander	(Finland) Pasi Someroja	(Finland) Tomi Weurlander	Citroën C2 R2	6
98	(Finland) Ilkka Kariste	(Finland) Mikael Lindberg	(Finland) Ilkka Kariste	Ford Fiesta ST	8
99	(Finland) Petri Itkonen	(Finland) Vesa Kari	(Finland) Vesa Kari	Citroën C2 R2	6
100	(Finland) Sami Valme	(Finland) Antti Linnaketo	(Finland) Antti Linnaketo	Citroën C2 R2	6
101	(United Kingdom) Alastair Fisher	(United Kingdom) Daniel Barritt	(United Kingdom) Alastair Fisher	Ford Fiesta R2	6
102	(Spain) José Antonio Suárez	(Spain) Cándido Carrera	(Spain) José Antonio Suárez	Ford Fiesta R2	6
103	(Italy) Andrea Crugnola	(Italy) Michele Ferrara	(Italy) Andrea Crugnola	Ford Fiesta R2	6
104	(Czech Republic) Jan Černý	(Czech Republic) Pavel Kohout	(Czech Republic) Czech National Team	Ford Fiesta R2	6
105	(Estonia) Miko-Ove Niinemäe	(Estonia) Timo Kasesalu	(Estonia) Miko-Ove Niinemäe	Ford Fiesta R2	6
106	(Australia) Brendan Reeves	(Australia) Rhianon Smyth	(Australia) Brendan Reeves	Ford Fiesta R2	6
108	(Estonia) Egon Kaur	(Estonia) Mait Laidvee	Playboy Estonia Rally Team	Ford Fiesta R2	6
109	(Republic of Ireland) Craig Breen	(United Kingdom) Gareth Roberts	(Republic of Ireland) Craig Breen	Ford Fiesta R2	6
110	(Spain) Yeray Lemes	(Spain) Rogelio Peñate	(Spain) Yeray Lemes	Ford Fiesta R2	6
111	(Sweden) Victor Henriksson	(Sweden) Joel Ardell	(Sweden) Victor Henriksson	Ford Fiesta R2	6
112	(Russia) Sergey Karyakin	(Russia) Anton Vlasyuk	(Russia) Ural Avia	Ford Fiesta R2	6
113	(Argentina) Miguel Angel Baldoni	(Argentina) Fernando Mussano	(Argentina) Miguel Angel Baldoni	Ford Fiesta R2	6
114	(Sweden) Fredrik Åhlin	(Sweden) Stefan Ottosson	(Sweden) Fredrik Åhlin	Ford Fiesta R2	6
115	(Australia) Molly Taylor	(United Kingdom) Sebastian Marshall	(Australia) Molly Taylor	Ford Fiesta R2	6
116	(Germany) Christian Riedemann	(Germany) Michael Wenzel	(Germany) ADAC Team Weser-EMS e.V.	Ford Fiesta R2	6
118	(Netherlands) Timo van der Marel	(Netherlands) Erwin Berkhof	(Netherlands) KNAF Talent First	Ford Fiesta R2	6
121	(Sweden) Patrik Flodin	(Sweden) Göran Bergsten	(Russia) Uspenskiy Rally Tecnica	Subaru Impreza WRX STi	3
122	(Poland) Michał Kościuszko	(Poland) Maciej Szczepaniak	(Poland) Lotos Dynamic Rally Team	Mitsubishi Lancer Evolution X	3
124	(Finland) Jarkko Nikara	(Finland) Petri Nikara	(Norway) Bilbutikken AS World Rally Team	Mitsubishi Lancer Evolution IX	3
125	(Finland) Jukka Ketomäki	(Finland) Kai Risberg	(Finland) Jukka Ketomäki	Mitsubishi Lancer Evolution X	3
126	(Czech Republic) Martin Semerád	(Czech Republic) Michal Ernst	(Czech Republic) Martin Semerád	Mitsubishi Lancer Evolution IX	3
127	(United Kingdom) Harry Hunt	(United Kingdom) Robbie Durant	(United Kingdom) Harry Hunt	Citroën DS3 R3T	5
128	(United Arab Emirates) Majed Al-Shamsi	(Republic of Ireland) Killian Duffy	(United Arab Emirates) Team Abu Dhabi	Subaru Impreza WRX STi	3
129	(United Arab Emirates) Bader Al-Jabri	(United Kingdom) Stephen McAuley	(United Arab Emirates) Team Abu Dhabi	Subaru Impreza WRX STi	3
130	(Ukraine) Oleksandr Saliuk, Jr.	(Ukraine) Pavlo Cherepin	(Ukraine) Mentos Ascania Racing	Mitsubishi Lancer Evolution IX	3
131	(Ukraine) Oleksiy Kikireshko	(Estonia) Sergei Larens	(Ukraine) Mentos Ascania Racing	Mitsubishi Lancer Evolution IX	3
132	(Ukraine) Valeriy Gorban	(Ukraine) Vadim Chernega	(Ukraine) Mentos Ascania Racing	Mitsubishi Lancer Evolution IX	3
133	(Russia) Dmitry Tagirov	(Russia) Anna Zavershinskaya	(Russia) Dmitry Tagirov	Subaru Impreza WRX STi	3
134	(Ukraine) Yuriy Protasov	(Ukraine) Adrian Aftanaziv	(Ukraine) Darnitsa Motorsport	Mitsubishi Lancer Evolution X	3
135	(Peru) Nicolás Fuchs	(Argentina) Ruben Garcia	(Peru) Nicolás Fuchs	Mitsubishi Lancer Evolution X	3
138	(New Zealand) Hayden Paddon	(New Zealand) John Kennard	(New Zealand) Hayden Paddon	Subaru Impreza WRX STi	3
139	(Mexico) Benito Guerra, Jr.	(Spain) Borja Rozada	(Mexico) Benito Guerra, Jr.	Mitsubishi Lancer Evolution X	3
149	(Finland) Riku Tahko	(Finland) Markus Soininen	(Finland) Riku Tahko	Mitsubishi Lancer Evolution X	3
150	(Finland) Mikko Pajunen	(Finland) Jani Salo	(Finland) Mikko Pajunen	Renault Clio R3	5
151	(Italy) Carlo Covi	(Italy) Giorgio Campesan	(Italy) Carlo Covi	Subaru Impreza WRX STi	3
152	(Finland) Santeri Jokinen	(Finland) Jonne Halttunen	(Finland) Santeri Jokinen	Honda Civic Type-R	8
153	(Finland) Janne Berg	(Finland) Sami Jokioinen	(Finland) Janne Berg	Ford Fiesta R2	6
154	(Finland) Ilkka Pastila	(Finland) Heikki Helenius	(Finland) Ilkka Pastila	Citroën Saxo VTS	9
155	(Finland) Raimo Kaisanlahti	(Finland) Tero Rönnemaa	(Finland) Raimo Kaisanlahti	Ford Fiesta R2	6
156	(Italy) Fabrizio de Sanctis	(Italy) Giorgia Larosa	(Italy) Fabrizio de Sanctis	Mitsubishi Lancer Evolution IX	3
157	(Egypt) Hassan Ali Abdel Baset	(United States) Chadi Beyrouthy	(Egypt) Hassan Ali Abdel Baset	Mitsubishi Lancer Evolution IX	3
158	(Finland) Sami Pyhälä	(Finland) Olli Ristimäki	(Finland) Olli Ristimäki	Škoda Felicia	7
159	(Finland) Matti Kortelainen	(Finland) Hannu Mattila	(Finland) Matti Kortelainen	Suzuki Swift Sport	9
160	(Finland) Kari Koskelainen	(Finland) Ismo Juottonen	(Finland) Kari Koskelainen	Škoda Felicia	7
161	(Finland) Pekka Vuorio	(Finland) Pekka Leppälä	(Finland) Pekka Vuorio	Škoda Fabia	7
162	(Finland) Janne Siikonen	(Finland) Jukka Pasanen	(Finland) Janne Siikonen	Škoda Felicia	9

== Results ==
=== Event standings ===
Pos.	Driver	Co-driver	Car	Time	Difference	Points
Overall
1.	(France) Sébastien Loeb	(Monaco) Daniel Elena	Citroën DS3 WRC	2:39:37.0	0.0	25
2.	(Finland) Jari-Matti Latvala	(Finland) Miikka Anttila	Ford Fiesta RS WRC	2:39:45.1	8.1	20
3.	(France) Sébastien Ogier	(France) Julien Ingrassia	Citroën DS3 WRC	2:39:49.8	12.8	16
4.	(Finland) Mikko Hirvonen	(Finland) Jarmo Lehtinen	Ford Fiesta RS WRC	2:40:46.1	1:09.1	15
5.	(Norway) Petter Solberg	(United Kingdom) Chris Patterson	Citroën DS3 WRC	2:40:53.2	1:16.2	10
6.	(Norway) Mads Østberg	(Sweden) Jonas Andersson	Ford Fiesta RS WRC	2:41:04.8	1:27.8	8
7.	(Norway) Henning Solberg	(Austria) Ilka Minor	Ford Fiesta RS WRC	2:43:02.5	3:25.5	6
8.	(United Kingdom) Matthew Wilson	(United Kingdom) Scott Martin	Ford Fiesta RS WRC	2:43:30.2	3:53.2	4
9.	(Finland) Kimi Räikkönen	(Finland) Kaj Lindström	Citroën DS3 WRC	2:43:36.8	3:59.8	2
10.	(Finland) Juho Hänninen	(Finland) Mikko Markkula	Škoda Fabia S2000	2:44:50.7	5:13.7	1
SWRC
1. (10.)	(Finland) Juho Hänninen	(Finland) Mikko Markkula	Škoda Fabia S2000	2:44:50.7	0.0	25
2. (12.)	(Czech Republic) Martin Prokop	(Czech Republic) Jan Tománek	Ford Fiesta S2000	2:47:28.4	2:37.7	18
3. (13.)	(Estonia) Ott Tänak	(Estonia) Kuldar Sikk	Ford Fiesta S2000	2:48:29.0	3:38.3	15
4. (16.)	(Germany) Hermann Gassner	(Germany) Kathi Wüstenhagen	Škoda Fabia S2000	2:50:43.3	5:52.6	12
5. (17.)	(Hungary) Frigyes Turán	(Hungary) Gábor Zsíros	Ford Fiesta S2000	2:51:01.9	6:11.2	10
6. (24.)	(Portugal) Bernardo Sousa	(Portugal) Paulo Babo	Ford Fiesta S2000	2:53:30.1	8:39.4	8
7. (27.)	(Estonia) Karl Kruuda	(Estonia) Martin Järveoja	Škoda Fabia S2000	2:56:20.8	11:30.1	6
8. (35.)	(Finland) Juha Salo	(Finland) Marko Salminen	Mitsubishi Lancer Evolution Xr4	3:02:26.8	17:36.1	4
PWRC
1. (19.)	(New Zealand) Hayden Paddon	(New Zealand) John Kennard	Subaru Impreza WRX STI	2:51:57.2	0.0	25
2. (21.)	(Finland) Jarkko Nikara	(Finland) Petri Nikara	Mitsubishi Lancer Evolution IX	2:52:37.4	40.2	18
3. (22.)	(Sweden) Patrik Flodin	(Sweden) Goran Bergsten	Subaru Impreza WRX STI	2:53:04.9	1:07.7	15
4. (23.)	(Finland) Jukka Ketomäki	(Finland) Kai Risberg	Mitsubishi Lancer Evolution X	2:53:10.4	1:13.2	12
5. (25.)	(Poland) Michał Kościuszko	(Poland) Maciej Szczepaniak	Mitsubishi Lancer Evolution X	2:54:09.8	2:12.6	10
6. (26.)	(Finland) Mikko Pajunen	(Finland) Jani Salo	Renault Clio R3	2:54:47.9	2:50.7	8
7. (40.)	(Ukraine) Valeriy Gorban	(Ukraine) Vadim Chernega	Mitsubishi Lancer Evolution IX	3:05:06.0	13:08.8	6
8. (51.)	(Ukraine) Oleksiy Kikireshko	(Estonia) Sergey Larens	Mitsubishi Lancer Evolution IX	3:14:03.0	22:05.8	4
9. (52.)	(Russia) Dmitry Tagirov	(Russia) Anna Zavershinskaya	Subaru Impreza WRX STI	3:14:31.4	22:34.2	2
WRC Academy^{†}
1.	(Estonia) Egon Kaur	(Estonia) Erik Lepikson	Ford Fiesta R2	2:41:24.7	0.0	30
2.	(Republic of Ireland) Craig Breen	(United Kingdom) Gareth Roberts	Ford Fiesta R2	2:41:27.3	2.6	23
3.	(Netherlands) Timo van der Marel	(Netherlands) Erwin Berkhof	Ford Fiesta R2	2:46:00.8	4:36.1	15
4.	(Australia) Brendan Reeves	(Australia) Rhianon Smyth	Ford Fiesta R2	2:47:17.9	5:53.2	12
5.	(Czech Republic) Jan Černý	(Czech Republic) Pavel Kohout	Ford Fiesta R2	2:47:23.2	5:58.5	10
6.	(Spain) Yeray Lemes	(Spain) Rogelio Peñate	Ford Fiesta R2	2:48:21.3	6:56.6	9
7.	(Germany) Christian Riedemann	(Germany) Michael Wenzel	Ford Fiesta R2	2:48:22.0	6:57.3	6
8.	(Estonia) Miko-Ove Niinemäe	(Estonia) Timo Kasesalu	Ford Fiesta R2	2:48:58.5	7:33.8	4
9.	(Australia) Molly Taylor	(Australia) Rebecca Smart	Ford Fiesta R2	2:53:15.4	11:50.7	2
10.	(Spain) José Antonio Suárez	(Spain) Cándido Carrera	Ford Fiesta R2	2:55:21.3	13:56.6	1

† – The WRC Academy featured 18 of the rally's 22 stages.

=== Special stages ===
Day	Stage	Time	Name	Length	Winner	Time	Avg. spd.	Rally leader
Leg 1 (28 July)	SS1	17:13	Lankamaa	23.76 km	(Finland) Jari Ketomaa	11:44.5	121.41 km/h	(Finland) Jari Ketomaa
Leg 1 (28 July)	SS2	18:16	Laukaa	11.79 km	(France) Sébastien Loeb	5:49.7	121.37 km/h	(France) Sébastien Loeb
Leg 1 (28 July)	SS3	20:00	Laajavuori 1	4.19 km	(France) Sébastien Loeb	2:37.3	95.89 km/h	(France) Sébastien Loeb
Leg 2 (29 July)	SS4	9:00	Hassi	20.35 km	(Finland) Mikko Hirvonen	11:14.3	108.65 km/h	(France) Sébastien Loeb
Leg 2 (29 July)	SS5	11:03	Evo	8.90 km	(Finland) Mikko Hirvonen	4:59.0	107.16 km/h	(France) Sébastien Loeb
Leg 2 (29 July)	SS6	11:53	Hyväneula 1	29.90 km	(Finland) Mikko Hirvonen	14:09.8	126.67 km/h	(France) Sébastien Loeb
Leg 2 (29 July)	SS7	14:59	Koukunmaa	13.68 km	(Finland) Jari-Matti Latvala	7:09.8	114.58 km/h	(France) Sébastien Loeb
Leg 2 (29 July)	SS8	15:37	Koivukehä	17.80 km	(Finland) Mikko Hirvonen	9:19.3	114.57 km/h	(France) Sébastien Loeb
Leg 2 (29 July)	SS9	16:20	Hyväneula 2	29.90 km	(Finland) Mikko Hirvonen	13:53.3	129.17 km/h	(France) Sébastien Ogier
Leg 2 (29 July)	SS10	18:00	Jokimaa	2.00 km	(France) Sébastien Ogier	1:33.4	77.09 km/h	(France) Sébastien Ogier
Leg 2 (29 July)	SS11	19:46	Mynnilä	12.07 km	(France) Sébastien Loeb	5:47.4	125.08 km/h	(France) Sébastien Loeb
Leg 3 (30 July)	SS12	7:58	Leustu 1	21.35 km	(France) Sébastien Loeb	10:13.1	125.36 km/h	(France) Sébastien Loeb
Leg 3 (30 July)	SS13	9:00	Surkee 1	14.66 km	(France) Sébastien Loeb	8:07.1	108.35 km/h	(France) Sébastien Loeb
Leg 3 (30 July)	SS14	9:55	Urria 1	12.75 km	(Finland) Mikko Hirvonen	6:01.9	126.83 km/h	(France) Sébastien Loeb
Leg 3 (30 July)	SS15	10:58	Jukojärvi 1	14.32 km	(Finland) Mikko Hirvonen	7:07.6	120.56 km/h	(France) Sébastien Loeb
Leg 3 (30 July)	SS16	11:23	Isojärvi 1	4.85 km	(Finland) Mikko Hirvonen	2:26.3	119.34 km/h	(France) Sébastien Loeb
Leg 3 (30 July)	SS17	13:55	Leustu 2	21.35 km	(Finland) Mikko Hirvonen	10:07.8	126.46 km/h	(France) Sébastien Loeb
Leg 3 (30 July)	SS18	14:57	Surkee 2	14.66 km	(Finland) Jari-Matti Latvala	8:00.3	109.88 km/h	(France) Sébastien Loeb
Leg 3 (30 July)	SS19	15:52	Urria 2	12.75 km	(Finland) Mikko Hirvonen	5:54.6	129.44 km/h	(France) Sébastien Loeb
Leg 3 (30 July)	SS20	16:55	Jukojärvi 2	14.32 km	(Finland) Mikko Hirvonen	7:01.7	122.25 km/h	(France) Sébastien Loeb
Leg 3 (30 July)	SS21	17:20	Isojärvi 2	4.85 km	(Finland) Mikko Hirvonen	2:25.1	120.33 km/h	(France) Sébastien Loeb
Leg 3 (30 July)	SS22	19:11	Laajavuori 2	4.19 km	(Finland) Mikko Hirvonen	2:39.6	94.51 km/h	(France) Sébastien Loeb

=== Power Stage ===
The "Power stage" was a live, televised 4.19 km (2.60 mi) stage at the end of the rally, held in Laajavuori.

Pos	Driver	Time	Diff.	Avg. speed	Points
1	(Finland) Mikko Hirvonen	2:39.6	0.0	94.51 km/h	3
2	(Finland) Jari-Matti Latvala	2:39.9	+0.3	94.33 km/h	2
3	(France) Sébastien Ogier	2:40.2	+0.6	94.16 km/h	1
