= Dennis Kuipers =

Dutch rally driver (born 1985)

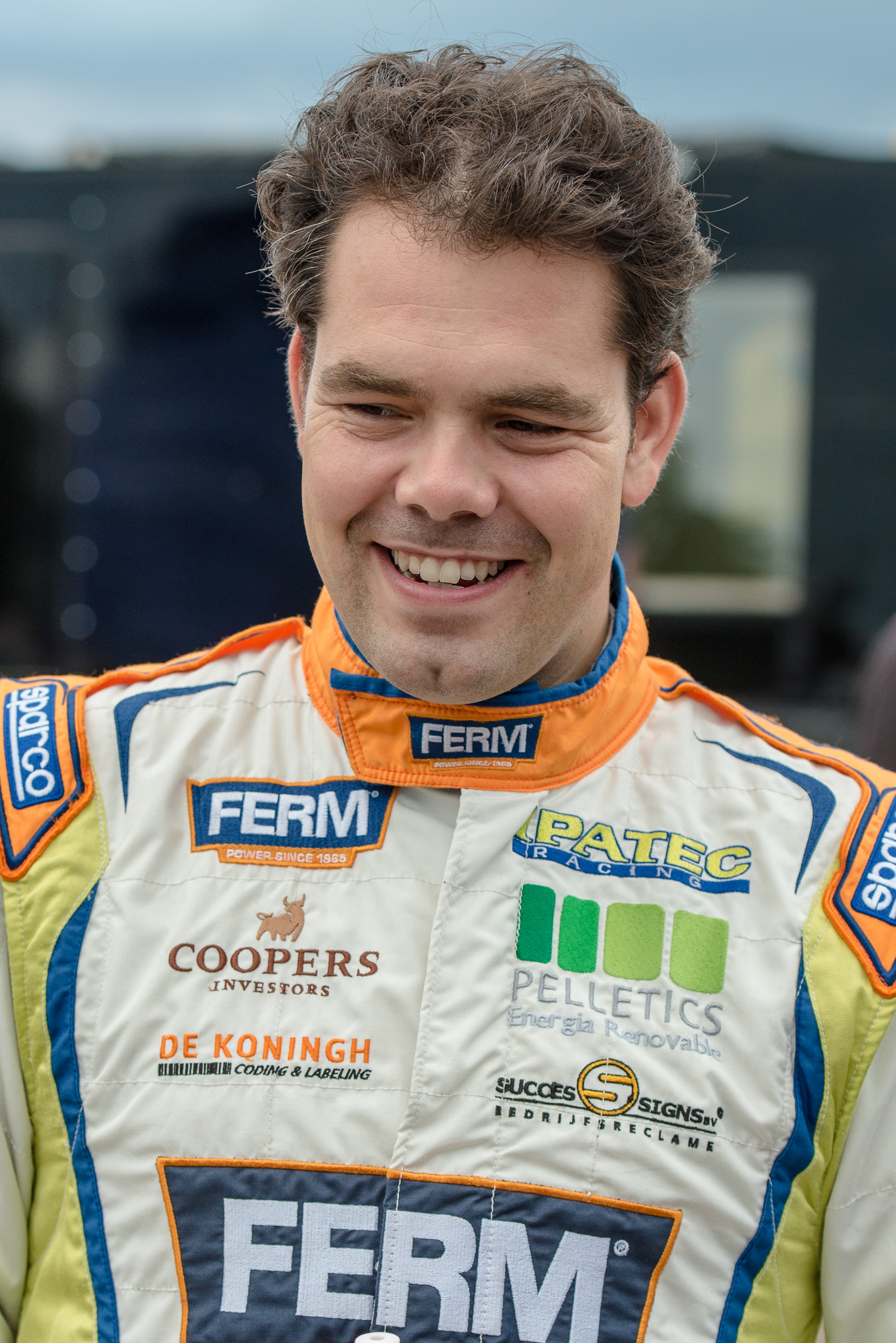
- Dennis Kuipers in 2014 Rallye Deutschland.

Personal information
- Nationality: (Netherlands) Dutch
- Full name: Dennis Edwin Kuipers
- Born: 23 November 1985 (age 40)

World Rally Championship record
- Years active: 2008–2014
- Co-driver: (Netherlands) Kees Hagman (Belgium) Frédéric Miclotte (Belgium) Bjorn Degandt (Belgium) Robin Buysmans
- Teams: Ipatec, Stobart, Ferm
- Rallies: 27
- Championships: 0
- Rally wins: 0
- Podiums: 0
- Stage wins: 0
- Total points: 35
- First rally: 2008 Rallye Deutschland
- Last rally: 2014 Rallye de France-Alsace

Dennis Edwin Kuipers (born 23 November 1985, in Almelo) is a Dutch rally driver.

== Career ==
The son of businessman and part-time rally driver Rene Kuipers, Dennis began rallying in his home country in 2007. He made his debut in the World Rally Championship at the 2008 Rallye Deutschland, finishing 18th in a Ford Focus RS WRC. He also competed at the 2009 Rally Portugal and 2009 Rally GB. In 2010, after doing the 2010 Rally Sweden in a Focus WRC, he began driving a Ford Fiesta S2000, entered by the Stobart Ford World Rally Team. In his first rally in the car, in Turkey, he finished ninth overall, scoring two points.

For 2011, Kuipers would drive a Ford Fiesta RS WRC on 11 rally's. He scored points in Portugal, Jordan, Greece, Germany, France, Spain and Wales. In France, he became the best scoring Dutchman in the WRC with his fifth-place finish.

== WRC results ==
Year	Entrant	Car	1	2	3	4	5	6	7	8	9	10	11	12	13	14	15	Pos.	Points
2008	Dennis Kuipers	Ford Focus RS WRC 06	MON	SWE	MEX	ARG	JOR	ITA	GRE	TUR	FIN	GER; 18	NZL	ESP	FRA	JPN	GBR	NC	0
2009	Ipatec Racing	Ford Focus RS WRC 06	IRE	NOR	CYP	POR; Ret	ARG	ITA	GRE	POL	FIN	AUS	ESP	GBR; 16				NC	0
2010	Ipatec Racing	Ford Focus RS WRC 06	SWE; 37															19th	2
2010	Stobart M-Sport Ford Rally Team	Ford Fiesta S2000		MEX	JOR	TUR; 9	NZL	POR; 19	BUL; 13	FIN; Ret	GER; 24	JPN	FRA; 17	ESP; 11	GBR; 16			19th	2
2011	FERM Power Tools World Rally Team	Ford Fiesta RS WRC	SWE; 13	MEX; Ret	POR; 10	JOR; 9	ITA; Ret	ARG	GRE; 10	FIN; 11	GER; 10	AUS	FRA; 5	ESP; 9	GBR; 8			12th	21
2012	M-Sport Ford World Rally Team	Ford Fiesta RS WRC	MON	SWE	MEX	POR; 6	ARG	GRE	NZL	FIN	GER	GBR	FRA	ITA	ESP			19th	8
2013	Dennis Kuipers	Ford Fiesta RS WRC	MON	SWE	MEX	POR; Ret	ARG	GRE	ITA	FIN	GER	AUS	FRA	ESP	GBR			NC	0
2014	M-Sport World Rally Team	Ford Fiesta RS WRC	MON	SWE	MEX	POR	ARG	ITA	POL	FIN	GER; 8	AUS	FRA; 11	ESP	GBR			20th	4
