= 2014 World Rally Championship =

42nd season of the World Rally Championship

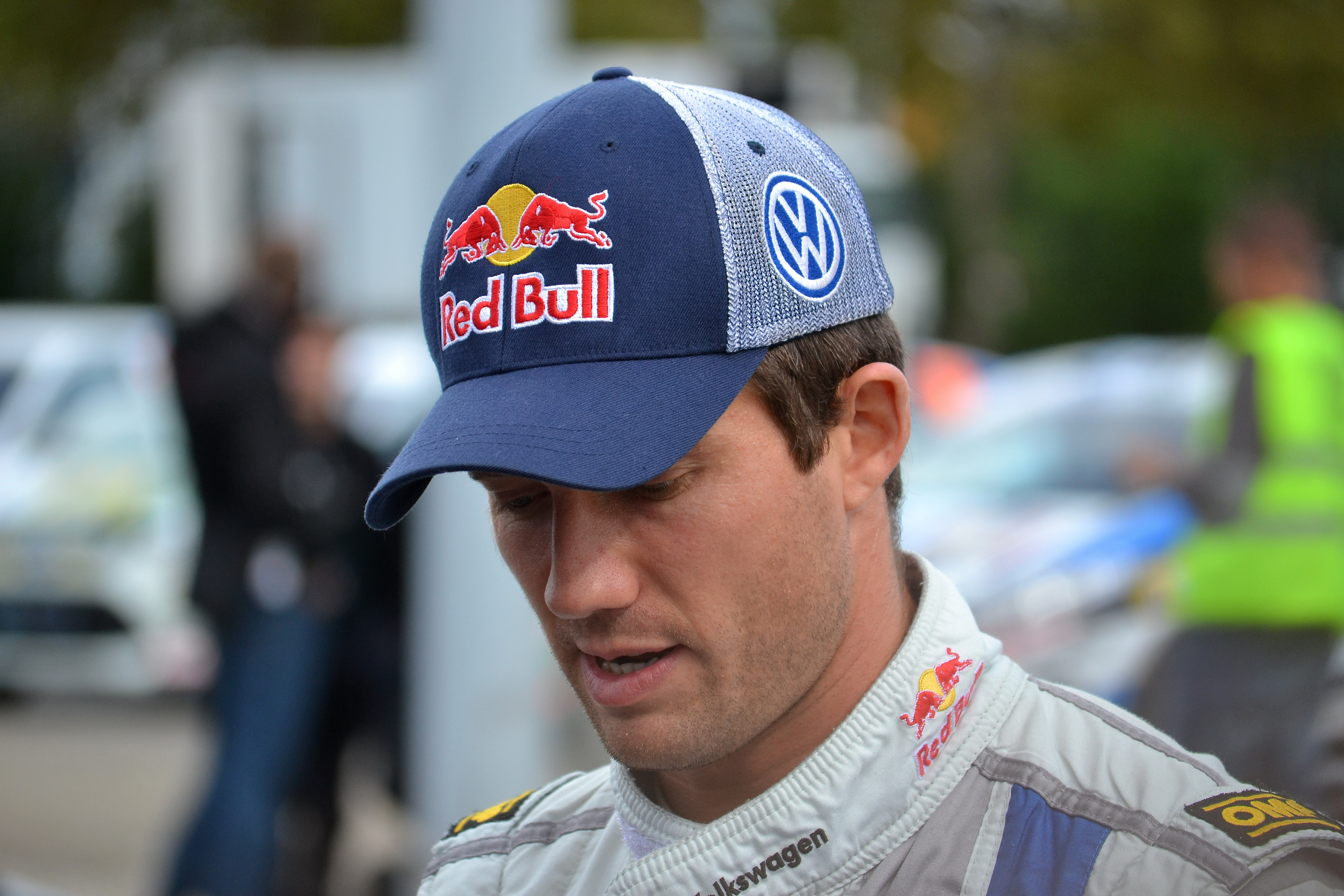
Sébastien Ogier successfully defended the World Drivers' Championship title.

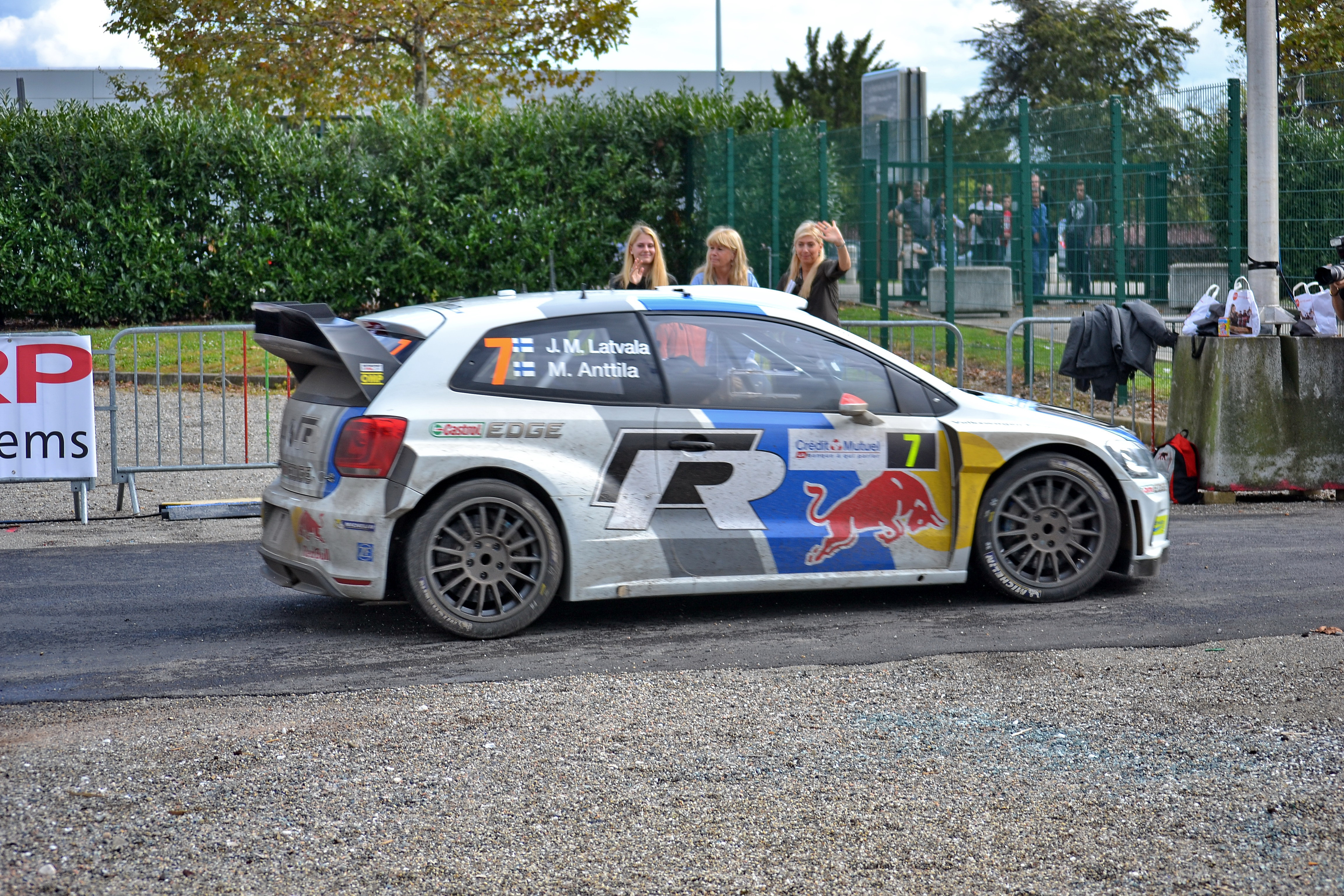
The Volkswagen Polo R WRC, car entered by Volkswagen Motorsport, who successfully defended World Manufacturers' Championship title.

The 2014 FIA World Rally Championship was the 42nd season of the World Rally Championship, a rallying championship recognised by the Fédération Internationale de l'Automobile as the highest class of international rallying. Teams and drivers contested thirteen rallies across four continents, competing for the FIA World Rally Championships for Drivers and Manufacturers. The WRC-2, WRC-3 and Junior WRC championships all ran in support of the premier championship.

The 2014 season saw Hyundai return to the championship as a manufacturer for the first time since the 2003 season. The Rally of Poland returned to the calendar after a five-year absence, replacing the Acropolis Rally.

Sébastien Ogier and his team, Volkswagen Motorsport, secured both Drivers and Manufacturers title for a second consecutive time. Ogier secured the title with a round to spare by winning in Rally de Catalunya, Ogier's teammate Jari-Matti Latvala and Volkswagen Motorsport II's Andreas Mikkelsen finished the championship in second and third. The Citroën World Rally Team was second at the Manufacturers' Championship.

== Calendar ==
The 2014 calendar was announced at a meeting of the FIA World Motor Sport Council in Croatia on 27 September 2013. The 2014 championship was contested over thirteen rounds in Europe, the Americas and Oceania.

Round	Dates	Rally name	Rally headquarters	Surface
1	16–18 January	(Monaco) Monte Carlo Rally	Gap, Hautes-Alpes, France	Mixed
2	5–8 February	Rally Sweden	Hagfors, Värmland	Snow
3	6–9 March	Rally Mexico	León, Guanajuato	Gravel
4	3–6 April	Rally de Portugal	Faro, Algarve	Gravel
5	8–11 May	Rally Argentina	Villa Carlos Paz, Córdoba	Gravel
6	6–8 June	(Italy) Rally Italia Sardegna	Alghero, Sardinia	Gravel
7	27–29 June	Rally Poland	Mikołajki, Warmia-Masuria	Gravel
8	31 July–3 August	Rally Finland	Jyväskylä, Keski-Suomi	Gravel
9	22–24 August	(Germany) Rallye Deutschland	Trier, Rhineland-Palatinate	Tarmac
10	12–14 September	Rally Australia	Coffs Harbour, New South Wales	Gravel
11	3–5 October	Rallye de France Alsace	Strasbourg, Alsace	Tarmac
12	24–26 October	(Spain) Rally de Catalunya	Salou, Tarragona	Mixed
13	14–16 November	(United Kingdom) Wales Rally GB	Deeside, Flintshire	Gravel

=== Calendar changes ===
- Rally Australia and Rally New Zealand abandoned the event-sharing arrangement established in 2008 that saw each event host a round of the championship every other year. After hosting an event in 2013, Rally Australia remains on the calendar throughout 2014 and 2015 before the arrangement is due to be renegotiated.
- The Rallye Monte Carlo relocated its base from Valence in the French province of Rhône-Alpes to the town of Gap in the neighbouring province of Hautes-Alpes.
- The 2014 calendar saw the Rally of Poland return to the championship for the first time since 2009. The event also crossed the border into Lithuania for one day of competition. Its inclusion came at the expense of the Acropolis Rally, which was removed after struggling with its financial obligations to the championship. The Acropolis Rally later moved to the European Rally Championship for the 2014 season. The rallies of Brazil and China had also been considered for inclusion on the WRC calendar before the FIA approved of the Rally of Poland.

== Teams and drivers ==
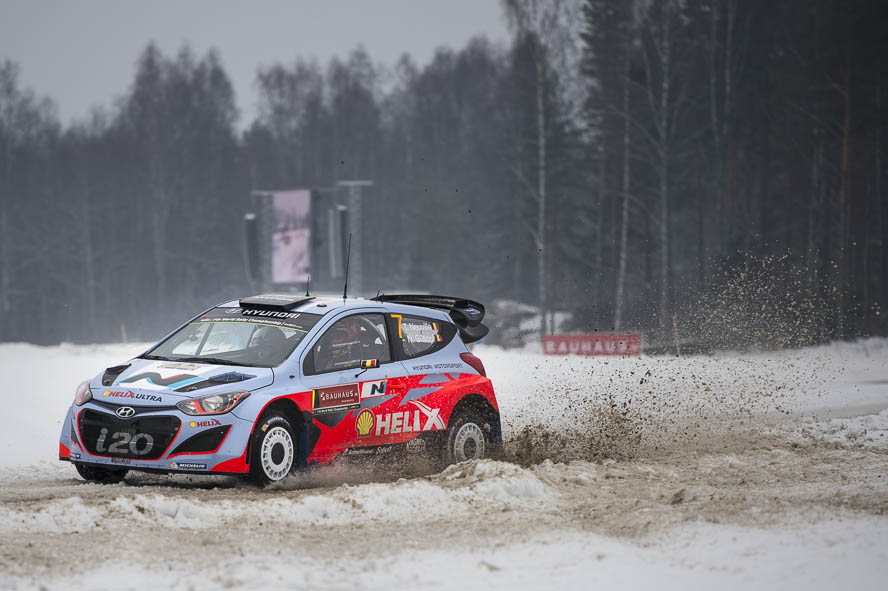
Hyundai returned to the WRC in 2014, competing with the i20 WRC.

The following teams and drivers are scheduled to compete in the World Rally Championship during the 2014 season:

World Rally Car entries eligible to score manufacturer points
Manufacturer	Car	Entrant	Tyre	No.	Drivers	Co-drivers	Rounds
Volkswagen	Volkswagen Polo R WRC	(Germany) Volkswagen Motorsport	M	1	(France) Sébastien Ogier	(France) Julien Ingrassia	All
Volkswagen	Volkswagen Polo R WRC	(Germany) Volkswagen Motorsport	M	2	(Finland) Jari-Matti Latvala	(Finland) Miikka Anttila	All
Volkswagen	Volkswagen Polo R WRC	(Germany) Volkswagen Motorsport II	M	9	(Norway) Andreas Mikkelsen	(Finland) Mikko Markkula	1–5
Volkswagen	Volkswagen Polo R WRC	(Germany) Volkswagen Motorsport II	M	9	(Norway) Andreas Mikkelsen	(Norway) Ola Fløene	6–9, 11–13
Citroën	Citroën DS3 WRC	(France) Citroën Total Abu Dhabi World Rally Team	M	3	(United Kingdom) Kris Meeke	(Republic of Ireland) Paul Nagle	All
Citroën	Citroën DS3 WRC	(France) Citroën Total Abu Dhabi World Rally Team	M	4	(Norway) Mads Østberg	(Sweden) Jonas Andersson	All
Ford	Ford Fiesta RS WRC	(United Kingdom) M-Sport World Rally Team	M	5	(Finland) Mikko Hirvonen	(Finland) Jarmo Lehtinen	All
Ford	Ford Fiesta RS WRC	(United Kingdom) M-Sport World Rally Team	M	6	(United Kingdom) Elfyn Evans	(United Kingdom) Daniel Barritt	All
Ford	Ford Fiesta RS WRC	(United Kingdom) RK M-Sport World Rally Team	M	10	(Poland) Robert Kubica	(Poland) Maciek Szczepaniak	All
Ford	Ford Fiesta RS WRC	(Czech Republic) Jipocar Czech National Team	M	21	(Czech Republic) Martin Prokop	(Czech Republic) Michal Ernst	1
Ford	Ford Fiesta RS WRC	(Czech Republic) Jipocar Czech National Team	M	21	(Czech Republic) Martin Prokop	(Czech Republic) Jan Tománek	2–9, 11
Ford	Ford Fiesta RS WRC	(Czech Republic) Jipocar Czech National Team	P	21	(Czech Republic) Martin Prokop	(Czech Republic) Jan Tománek	12–13
Hyundai	Hyundai i20 WRC	(South Korea) Hyundai Shell World Rally Team	M	7	(Belgium) Thierry Neuville	(Belgium) Nicolas Gilsoul	All
Hyundai	Hyundai i20 WRC	(South Korea) Hyundai Shell World Rally Team	M	8	(Spain) Dani Sordo	(Spain) Marc Martí	1, 5, 9, 11–12
Hyundai	Hyundai i20 WRC	(South Korea) Hyundai Shell World Rally Team	M	8	(Finland) Juho Hänninen	(Finland) Tomi Tuominen	2, 4, 6–8, 13
Hyundai	Hyundai i20 WRC	(South Korea) Hyundai Shell World Rally Team	M	8	(Australia) Chris Atkinson	(Belgium) Stéphane Prévot	3, 10
Hyundai	Hyundai i20 WRC	(South Korea) Hyundai Motorsport N	M	20	(Spain) Dani Sordo	(Spain) Marc Martí	4
Hyundai	Hyundai i20 WRC	(South Korea) Hyundai Motorsport N	M	20	(New Zealand) Hayden Paddon	(New Zealand) John Kennard	6–8, 10, 12–13
Hyundai	Hyundai i20 WRC	(South Korea) Hyundai Motorsport N	M	20	(France) Bryan Bouffier	(France) Xavier Panseri	9, 11

World Rally Car entries ineligible to score manufacturer points
Manufacturer	Car	Entrant	Tyre	Drivers	Co-drivers	Rounds
Citroën	Citroën DS3 WRC	(France) Citroën Total Abu Dhabi World Rally Team	M	(United Arab Emirates) Khalid Al Qassimi	(United Kingdom) Chris Patterson	2, 4, 6, 12
Citroën	Citroën DS3 WRC	(France) Armando Pereira	M	(France) Armando Pereira	(France) Damien Augustin	11
Ford	Ford Fiesta RS WRC	(United Kingdom) M-Sport World Rally Team	M	(France) Bryan Bouffier	(France) Xavier Panseri	1
Ford	Ford Fiesta RS WRC	(United Kingdom) M-Sport World Rally Team	M	(Estonia) Ott Tänak	(Estonia) Raigo Mõlder	2, 4
Ford	Ford Fiesta RS WRC	(United Kingdom) M-Sport World Rally Team	M	(Poland) Michał Sołowow	(Poland) Maciek Baran	2, 7–8
Ford	Ford Fiesta RS WRC	(United Kingdom) M-Sport World Rally Team	M	(Mexico) Benito Guerra	(Spain) Borja Rozada	3
Ford	Ford Fiesta RS WRC	(United Kingdom) M-Sport World Rally Team	M	(Netherlands) Dennis Kuipers	(Belgium) Robin Buysmans	9, 11
Ford	Ford Fiesta RS WRC	(United Kingdom) M-Sport World Rally Team	M	(Ukraine) Yuriy Protasov	(Ukraine) Pavlo Cherepin	9, 11–12
Ford	Ford Fiesta RS WRC	(United Kingdom) M-Sport World Rally Team	P	(United States) Ken Block	(Italy) Alex Gelsomino	12
Ford	Ford Fiesta RS WRC	Slovakia World Rally Team	M	(Slovakia) Jaroslav Melichárek	(Slovakia) Erik Melichárek	1
Ford	Ford Fiesta RS WRC	Slovakia World Rally Team	D	(Slovakia) Jaroslav Melichárek	(Slovakia) Erik Melichárek	6
Ford	Ford Fiesta RS WRC	Slovakia World Rally Team	P	(Slovakia) Jaroslav Melichárek	(Slovakia) Erik Melichárek	9
Ford	Ford Fiesta RS WRC	(France) François Delecour	M	(France) François Delecour	(France) Dominique Savignoni	1
Ford	Ford Fiesta RS WRC	(Sweden) Pontus Tidemand	M	(Sweden) Pontus Tidemand	(Norway) Ola Fløene	2
Ford	Ford Fiesta RS WRC	(Norway) Henning Solberg	P	(Norway) Henning Solberg	(Austria) Ilka Minor	2, 4, 6, 13
Ford	Ford Fiesta RS WRC	(Norway) Henning Solberg	D	(Norway) Henning Solberg	(Austria) Ilka Minor	7–8
Ford	Ford Fiesta RS WRC	(Republic of Ireland) Craig Breen	M	(Republic of Ireland) Craig Breen	(United Kingdom) Scott Martin	2, 8
Ford	Ford Fiesta RS WRC	(Poland) Lotto Team	M	(Poland) Krzysztof Hołowczyc	(Poland) Łukasz Kurzeja	7
Ford	Ford Fiesta RS WRC	(Finland) Jarkko Nikara	P	(Finland) Jarkko Nikara	(Finland) Jarkko Kalliolepo	8
Ford	Ford Fiesta RS WRC	(Republic of Ireland) Sam Moffett	P	(Republic of Ireland) Sam Moffett	(Republic of Ireland) James O'Reilly	9
Ford	Ford Fiesta RS WRC	(France) Julien Maurin	P	(France) Julien Maurin	(France) Nicolas Klinger	11
Ford	Ford Fiesta RS WRC	(United Kingdom) Drive DMACK	D	(Estonia) Ott Tänak	(Estonia) Raigo Mõlder	13
Volkswagen	Volkswagen Polo R WRC	(Germany) Volkswagen Motorsport II	M	(Norway) Andreas Mikkelsen	(Norway) Ola Fløene	10

=== Team changes ===
- Citroën will scale back its involvement in the championship, limiting its programme to two full-time works-supported cars, with a third car entered in selected events. As a result, its customer car programme will be brought to an end. The decision to reduce its commitment to the WRC stemmed from Citroën's expansion into the World Touring Car Championship and the logistical challenges of establishing itself in a new series.
- Martin Prokop's M-Sport-supported Czech National Team will expand to enter a second Ford Fiesta RS WRC at selected events throughout the season. The second car will compete under the name "Slovakia World Rally Team".
- Korean car manufacturer Hyundai will return to the championship as a manufacturer team, competing with the i20 WRC. The Hyundai World Rally Team had originally planned to compete with two full-time entries, but later expanded to include two part-time entries as well. Hyundai had previously competed in the WRC with the Hyundai Accent WRC from 2000 to 2003.
- The Qatar World Rally Team and Lotos Team WRC will not start the season.

=== Driver changes ===
- Nasser Al-Attiyah will not start the season after the Qatar World Rally Team did not submit an entry and the Qatari government ended its sponsorship of M-Sport.
- Chris Atkinson will join Hyundai on a part-time basis, competing in selected events including Rally Australia. Atkinson will share the team's second entry with Dani Sordo and Juho Hänninen.
- 2012 Super 2000 World Rally Champion Craig Breen will make his debut in a World Rally Car-specification car at the Rally of Sweden
- Elfyn Evans, who won the WRC Academy in 2012 and placed seventh overall in the 2013 WRC2 Championship will join M-Sport.
- Juho Hänninen, who contested three events in 2013 with Qatar World Rally Team, will compete at selected events in 2014 with Hyundai. Hänninen will share the car with Dani Sordo and Chris Atkinson. Hänninen will make his first appearance for the team at the Rally of Sweden.
- Mikko Hirvonen lost his seat at Citroën after two seasons with the team. He will return to M-Sport, the team he competed with from 2006 to 2011, when it was known as the Ford World Rally Team.
- Former Formula One driver and reigning WRC2 champion Robert Kubica will join the sport's top tier of competition in 2014, driving an M-Sport-prepared Ford Fiesta RS WRC as a satellite team of M-Sport.
- After taking part in selected events during the 2013 season, nine-time World Drivers' Champion Sébastien Loeb will leave the World Rally Championship, moving to the World Touring Car Championship with Citroën Racing.
- Kris Meeke will return to full-time competition, joining Citroën after making guest appearances in the team's third car in 2013.
- Slovak driver Jaroslav Melichárek will make his WRC debut, driving a Ford Fiesta RS WRC run by the Jipocar Czech National Team under the name "Slovakia World Rally Team". Melichárek had previously campaigned a Citroën C4 WRC in the Czech and Slovak national championships before joining the team.
- Thierry Neuville will leave the Qatar World Rally Team to join Hyundai's works team.
- Evgenij Novikov lost his seat with M-Sport. He ruled out contesting the full 2014 season as he focused on securing funds for a drive in 2015, but expressed a willingness to make guest appearances at selected events.
- Mads Østberg will leave M-Sport after two seasons competing for Ford-backed teams M-Sport and Adapta. He will be driving for Citroën alongside Kris Meeke.
- 2011 Production Car World Rally Champion Hayden Paddon will compete part-time throughout the 2014 season, driving an i20 WRC.
- Dani Sordo will leave Citroën for Hyundai, sharing the team's second entry with Chris Atkinson and Juho Hänninen. Sordo will be the first of the three to drive the i20 WRC, starting the Rallye Monte Carlo.
- Ott Tänak will return to the World Rally Championship, contesting selected events in a privately entered Ford Fiesta RS WRC whilst campaigning in the WRC-2 series with a Fiesta R5.

== Changes ==
- Pirelli will return to the World Rally Championship as a tyre supplier in 2014, joining existing suppliers Michelin, DMACK and Hankook. Pirelli was previously the exclusive supplier for the championship from 2008 to 2010.
- The rules governing the running order for a day's stages will change in 2014, after the FIA expressed dissatisfaction with the qualifying stage format introduced in 2012, whereby the fastest drivers during the event shakedown were given the opportunity to choose their starting position for the rally as a means of discouraging drivers from stopping on a stage in order to gain a more-favourable starting position the next day. The final format was decided upon at the December 2013 meeting of the World Motor Sport Council, with WRC and WRC-2 drivers starting in their provisional championship classification for the first day of the rally, before starting the second and third days in reverse order of the provisional rally classification. Cars that have retired on one day and are restarting the next under Rally-2 regulations will be placed after the WRC and WRC-2 driver groups.
- Manufacturers will no longer be required to nominate one permanent driver for the season, but will instead be obliged to nominate one driver for a minimum of ten events, leaving them free to rotate drivers through the remaining events as they so choose.
- Rallies must now follow a fixed format. There will be a ceremonial start on Thursday, with the last stage run as the Power Stage. The length of the Power Stage must be at least ten kilometers.
- All competitors registered in the Championships–WRC, WRC-2, WRC-3 and the Junior WRC—will be obliged to use a colour-coded windscreen sticker to distinguish its category.

== Rally summaries ==
=== Round 1 — Monte-Carlo Rally ===
Round	Rally name	Podium finishers					Statistics			
Round	Rally name	Pos.	No.	Driver	Team	Time	Stages	Length	Starters	Finishers
1	(Monaco) Monte Carlo Rally (15–18 January) — Results and report	1	1	(France) Sébastien Ogier (France) Julien Ingrassia	(Germany) Volkswagen Motorsport (Volkswagen Polo R WRC)	3:55:14.4	(15)^{1a} 14	(383.88 km)^{1b} 360.48 km	62	40
1	(Monaco) Monte Carlo Rally (15–18 January) — Results and report	2	11	(France) Bryan Bouffier (France) Xavier Panseri	(United Kingdom) M-Sport WRT (Ford Fiesta RS WRC)	3:56:33.3	(15)^{1a} 14	(383.88 km)^{1b} 360.48 km	62	40
1	(Monaco) Monte Carlo Rally (15–18 January) — Results and report	3	3	(United Kingdom) Kris Meeke (Republic of Ireland) Paul Nagle	(France) Citroën Total Abu Dhabi WRT (Citroën DS3 WRC)	3:57:08.7	(15)^{1a} 14	(383.88 km)^{1b} 360.48 km	62	40

The first round of the season was run in difficult conditions, with heavy rain making for a slippery surface and low visibility. Former Formula One driver Robert Kubica took an early lead, but fell behind on the first leg when he made the wrong tyre choice. French privateer Bryan Bouffier – who won the event in 2011, when it was a round of the Intercontinental Rally Challenge – took control and led the field at the end of the first day. Bouffier came under pressure from reigning World Champion Sébastien Ogier on the second day, and ultimately lost the lead when he spun during the afternoon stages, whilst Kubica crashed out. Ogier's rally was not without incident, with the Volkswagen driver surviving several close encounters with walls as he tried to recover from a poor start. Ogier went on to win the rally by over a minute, with Bouffier second and Kris Meeke finishing third. Hyundai's return to the World Rally Championship started and ended poorly as Thierry Neuville crashed heavily on the first stage and teammate Dani Sordo was forced to retire with a suspected electrical fault.

=== Round 2 – Rally Sweden ===
Round	Rally name	Podium finishers					Statistics			
Round	Rally name	Pos.	No.	Driver	Team	Time	Stages	Length	Starters	Finishers
2	Rally Sweden (5–8 February) — Results and report	1	2	(Finland) Jari-Matti Latvala (Finland) Miikka Anttila	(Germany) Volkswagen Motorsport (Volkswagen Polo R WRC)	3:00:31.1	(24)^{2a} 23	(323.54 km)^{2b} 312.22 km	39	30
2	Rally Sweden (5–8 February) — Results and report	2	9	(Norway) Andreas Mikkelsen (Finland) Mikko Markkula	(Germany) Volkswagen Motorsport II (Volkswagen Polo R WRC)	3:01:24.7	(24)^{2a} 23	(323.54 km)^{2b} 312.22 km	39	30
2	Rally Sweden (5–8 February) — Results and report	3	4	(Norway) Mads Østberg (Sweden) Jonas Andersson	(France) Citroën Total Abu Dhabi WRT (Citroën DS3 WRC)	3:01:30.6	(24)^{2a} 23	(323.54 km)^{2b} 312.22 km	39	30

=== Round 3 – Rally Mexico ===
Round	Rally name	Podium finishers					Statistics			
Round	Rally name	Pos.	No.	Driver	Team	Time	Stages	Length	Starters	Finishers
3	Rally Mexico (6–9 March) — Results and report	1	1	(France) Sébastien Ogier (France) Julien Ingrassia	(Germany) Volkswagen Motorsport (Volkswagen Polo R WRC)	4:27:41.8	21	401.77 km	26	23
3	Rally Mexico (6–9 March) — Results and report	2	2	(Finland) Jari-Matti Latvala (Finland) Miikka Anttila	(Germany) Volkswagen Motorsport (Volkswagen Polo R WRC)	4:28:54.4	21	401.77 km	26	23
3	Rally Mexico (6–9 March) — Results and report	3	7	(Belgium) Thierry Neuville (Belgium) Nicolas Gilsoul	(South Korea) Hyundai Shell World Rally Team (Hyundai i20 WRC)	4:33:10.4	21	401.77 km	26	23

=== Round 4 — Rally de Portugal ===
Round	Rally name	Podium finishers					Statistics			
Round	Rally name	Pos.	No.	Driver	Team	Time	Stages	Length	Starters	Finishers
4	Rally Portugal (3–6 April) — Results and report	1	1	(France) Sébastien Ogier (France) Julien Ingrassia	(Germany) Volkswagen Motorsport (Volkswagen Polo R WRC)	3:33:20.4	16	339.46 km	84	60
4	Rally Portugal (3–6 April) — Results and report	2	5	(Finland) Mikko Hirvonen (Finland) Jarmo Lehtinen	(United Kingdom) M-Sport WRT (Ford Fiesta RS WRC)	3:34:03.6	16	339.46 km	84	60
4	Rally Portugal (3–6 April) — Results and report	3	4	(Norway) Mads Østberg (Sweden) Jonas Andersson	(France) Citroën Total Abu Dhabi WRT (Citroën DS3 WRC)	3:34:32.8	16	339.46 km	84	60

WRC leader Sébastien Ogier was the first on the road in the first leg, but his disadvantage was decreased since in the days before the rally it rained, and the Algarve roads were a combination of dry and a little moist tracks, which led to difficulties for drivers to choose the right tire compound. Sébastien Ogier led the rally since Lisbon SSS until the last stage of the first leg (SS7), finishing behind Mikko Hirvonen (1st) and Ott Tänak. In the middle Dani Sordo was in the lead after winning SS2 and SS3 with his Hyundai i20 WRC. In the 2nd leg Sébastien Ogier imposed a demonic pace retaking the lead and quickly pulled out of Mikko Hirvonen. Mads Østberg finished in the podium last place. Dani Sordo after a promising start, retired at the beginning of the last day (due to mechanical when he was heading do start SS14) when he was in overall fourth place. This rally was marked by the high number of crashes between the top drivers: Jari-Matti Latvala, Kris Meeke, Elfyn Evans and Robert Kubica (who would crash again in 2nd leg).

=== Round 5 — Rally Argentina ===
Round	Rally name	Podium finishers					Statistics			
Round	Rally name	Pos.	No.	Driver	Team	Time	Stages	Length	Starters	Finishers
5	Rally Argentina (8–11 May) — Results and report	1	2	(Finland) Jari-Matti Latvala (Finland) Miikka Anttila	(Germany) Volkswagen Motorsport (Volkswagen Polo R WRC)	4:41:24.8	14	405.10 km	29	23
5	Rally Argentina (8–11 May) — Results and report	2	1	(France) Sébastien Ogier (France) Julien Ingrassia	(Germany) Volkswagen Motorsport (Volkswagen Polo R WRC)	4:42:51.7	14	405.10 km	29	23
5	Rally Argentina (8–11 May) — Results and report	3	3	(United Kingdom) Kris Meeke (Republic of Ireland) Paul Nagle	(France) Citroën Total Abu Dhabi WRT (Citroën DS3 WRC)	4:47:19.5	14	405.10 km	29	23

=== Round 6 – Rally Italia Sardegna ===
Round	Rally name	Podium finishers					Statistics			
Round	Rally name	Pos.	No.	Driver	Team	Time	Stages	Length	Starters	Finishers
6	(Italy) Rally Italia Sardegna (6–8 June) — Results and report	1	1	(France) Sébastien Ogier (France) Julien Ingrassia	(Germany) Volkswagen Motorsport (Volkswagen Polo R WRC)	4:02:37.8	17	364.54 km	57	39
6	(Italy) Rally Italia Sardegna (6–8 June) — Results and report	2	4	(Norway) Mads Østberg (Sweden) Jonas Andersson	(France) Citroën Total Abu Dhabi WRT (Citroën DS3 WRC)	4:04:00.9	17	364.54 km	57	39
6	(Italy) Rally Italia Sardegna (6–8 June) — Results and report	3	2	(Finland) Jari-Matti Latvala (Finland) Miikka Anttila	(Germany) Volkswagen Motorsport (Volkswagen Polo R WRC)	4:04:10.6	17	364.54 km	57	39

=== Round 7 – Rally Poland ===
Round	Rally name	Podium finishers					Statistics			
Round	Rally name	Pos.	No.	Driver	Team	Time	Stages	Length	Starters	Finishers
7	Rally Poland (27–29 June) — Results and report	1	1	(France) Sébastien Ogier (France) Julien Ingrassia	(Germany) Volkswagen Motorsport (Volkswagen Polo R WRC)	2:34:02.0	24	336,64 km	68	52
7	Rally Poland (27–29 June) — Results and report	2	9	(Norway) Andreas Mikkelsen (Norway) Ola Fløene	(Germany) Volkswagen Motorsport II (Volkswagen Polo R WRC)	2:35:09.7	24	336,64 km	68	52
7	Rally Poland (27–29 June) — Results and report	3	7	(Belgium) Thierry Neuville (Belgium) Nicolas Gilsoul	(South Korea) Hyundai Shell World Rally Team (Hyundai i20 WRC)	2:36:15.5	24	336,64 km	68	52

=== Round 8 – Rally Finland ===
Round	Rally name	Podium finishers					Statistics			
Round	Rally name	Pos.	No.	Driver	Team	Time	Stages	Length	Starters	Finishers
8	Rally Finland (1–3 August) — Results and report	1	2	(Finland) Jari-Matti Latvala (Finland) Miikka Anttila	(Germany) Volkswagen Motorsport (Volkswagen Polo R WRC)	2:57:23.2	26	360,94 km	77	54
8	Rally Finland (1–3 August) — Results and report	2	1	(France) Sébastien Ogier (France) Julien Ingrassia	(Germany) Volkswagen Motorsport (Volkswagen Polo R WRC)	2:57:26.8	26	360,94 km	77	54
8	Rally Finland (1–3 August) — Results and report	3	3	(United Kingdom) Kris Meeke (Republic of Ireland) Paul Nagle	(France) Citroën Total Abu Dhabi WRT (Citroën DS3 WRC)	2:58:13.8	26	360,94 km	77	54

=== Round 9 – Rallye Deutschland ===
Round	Rally name	Podium finishers					Statistics			
Round	Rally name	Pos.	No.	Driver	Team	Time	Stages	Length	Starters	Finishers
9	(Germany) Rallye Deutschland (22–24 August) — Results and report	1	7	(Belgium) Thierry Neuville (Belgium) Nicolas Gilsoul	(South Korea) Hyundai Shell World Rally Team (Hyundai i20 WRC)	3:07:20.2	18	324,31 km	85	63
9	(Germany) Rallye Deutschland (22–24 August) — Results and report	2	8	(Spain) Dani Sordo (Spain) Marc Martí	(South Korea) Hyundai Shell World Rally Team (Hyundai i20 WRC)	3:08:00.9	18	324,31 km	85	63
9	(Germany) Rallye Deutschland (22–24 August) — Results and report	3	9	(Norway) Andreas Mikkelsen (Norway) Ola Fløene	(Germany) Volkswagen Motorsport II (Volkswagen Polo R WRC)	3:08:18.2	18	324,31 km	85	63

=== Round 10 – Rally Australia ===
Round	Rally name	Podium finishers					Statistics			
Round	Rally name	Pos.	No.	Driver	Team	Time	Stages	Length	Starters	Finishers
10	Rally Australia (12–14 September) — Results and report	1	1	(France) Sébastien Ogier (France) Julien Ingrassia	(Germany) Volkswagen Motorsport (Volkswagen Polo R WRC)	2:53:18.0	20	304,34 km	27	23
10	Rally Australia (12–14 September) — Results and report	2	2	(Finland) Jari-Matti Latvala (Finland) Miikka Anttila	(Germany) Volkswagen Motorsport (Volkswagen Polo R WRC)	2:53:24.8	20	304,34 km	27	23
10	Rally Australia (12–14 September) — Results and report	3	9	(Norway) Andreas Mikkelsen (Norway) Ola Fløene	(Germany) Volkswagen Motorsport II (Volkswagen Polo R WRC)	2:54:36.0	20	304,34 km	27	23

=== Round 11 – Rallye de France Alsace ===
Round	Rally name	Podium finishers					Statistics			
Round	Rally name	Pos.	No.	Driver	Team	Time	Stages	Length	Starters	Finishers
11	Rallye de France Alsace (3–5 October) — Results and report	1	2	(Finland) Jari-Matti Latvala (Finland) Miikka Anttila	(Germany) Volkswagen Motorsport (Volkswagen Polo R WRC)	2:38:19.1	18	303,63 km	91	75
11	Rallye de France Alsace (3–5 October) — Results and report	2	9	(Norway) Andreas Mikkelsen (Norway) Ola Fløene	(Germany) Volkswagen Motorsport II (Volkswagen Polo R WRC)	2:39:03.9	18	303,63 km	91	75
11	Rallye de France Alsace (3–5 October) — Results and report	3	3	(United Kingdom) Kris Meeke (Republic of Ireland) Paul Nagle	(France) Citroën Total Abu Dhabi WRT (Citroën DS3 WRC)	2:39:24.4	18	303,63 km	91	75

=== Round 12 – Rally Catalunya ===
Round	Rally name	Podium finishers					Statistics			
Round	Rally name	Pos.	No.	Driver	Team	Time	Stages	Length	Starters	Finishers
12	(Spain) Rally de Catalunya (24–26 October) — Results and report	1	1	(France) Sébastien Ogier (France) Julien Ingrassia	(Germany) Volkswagen Motorsport (Volkswagen Polo R WRC)	3:46:44.6	17	372,96 km	65	56
12	(Spain) Rally de Catalunya (24–26 October) — Results and report	2	2	(Finland) Jari-Matti Latvala (Finland) Miikka Anttila	(Germany) Volkswagen Motorsport (Volkswagen Polo R WRC)	3:46:55.9	17	372,96 km	65	56
12	(Spain) Rally de Catalunya (24–26 October) — Results and report	3	5	(Finland) Mikko Hirvonen (Finland) Jarmo Lehtinen	(United Kingdom) M-Sport WRT (Ford Fiesta RS WRC)	3:48:26.8	17	372,96 km	65	56

=== Round 13 – Wales Rally GB ===
Round	Rally name	Podium finishers					Statistics			
Round	Rally name	Pos.	No.	Driver	Team	Time	Stages	Length	Starters	Finishers
13	(United Kingdom) Wales Rally GB (14–16 November) — Results and report	1	1	(France) Sébastien Ogier (France) Julien Ingrassia	(Germany) Volkswagen Motorsport (Volkswagen Polo R WRC)	3:03:08.2	17	305,64 km	63	53
13	(United Kingdom) Wales Rally GB (14–16 November) — Results and report	2	5	(Finland) Mikko Hirvonen (Finland) Jarmo Lehtinen	(United Kingdom) M-Sport WRT (Ford Fiesta RS WRC)	3:03:45.8	17	305,64 km	63	53
13	(United Kingdom) Wales Rally GB (14–16 November) — Results and report	3	4	(Norway) Mads Østberg (Sweden) Jonas Andersson	(France) Citroën Total Abu Dhabi WRT (Citroën DS3 WRC)	3:04:11.8	17	305,64 km	63	53

Notes:

- ^1 – The Monte Carlo Rally was shortened when a competitor stopped on Stage 14, blocking traffic and forcing organisers to abandon the stage.
- ^2 – The Rally Sweden was shortened when a computer error disabled the timing system, preventing one of the stages from being run.

== Results and standings ==
=== FIA World Rally Championship for Drivers ===
Points are awarded to the top ten classified finishers. There are also three bonus points awarded to the winner of the Power Stage, two points for second place and one for third.

Position	1st	2nd	3rd	4th	5th	6th	7th	8th	9th	10th
Points	25	18	15	12	10	8	6	4	2	1

Pos.	Driver	MON (Monaco)	SWE (Sweden)	MEX (Mexico)	POR (Portugal)	ARG (Argentina)	ITA (Italy)	POL (Poland)	FIN (Finland)	GER (Germany)	AUS (Australia)	FRA (France)	ESP (Spain)	GBR (United Kingdom)	Points
1	(France) Sébastien Ogier	1^{2}	6	1^{1}	1^{1}	2^{1}	1^{3}	1^{1}	2^{1}	Ret	1^{2}	13^{1}	1	1	267
2	(Finland) Jari-Matti Latvala	5^{1}	1^{2}	2^{2}	14^{2}	1^{3}	3^{2}	5^{3}	1^{2}	Ret	2^{1}	1^{3}	2^{1}	8^{1}	218
3	(Norway) Andreas Mikkelsen	7	2	19	4	4	4^{1}	2^{2}	4	3	3	2	7^{3}	Ret	150
4	(Finland) Mikko Hirvonen	Ret	4^{3}	8^{3}	2	9^{2}	Ret	4	5	5^{3}	5	5	3	2	126
5	(Norway) Mads Østberg	4	3^{1}	9	3^{3}	Ret	2	Ret	Ret	6	16	7	4	3^{3}	108
6	(Belgium) Thierry Neuville	Ret	28	3	7	5	16	3	Ret	1^{2}	7	8	6	4^{2}	105
7	(United Kingdom) Kris Meeke	3^{3}	10	Ret	Ret	3	18	7	3^{3}	Ret	4^{3}	3	19^{2}	6	92
8	(United Kingdom) Elfyn Evans	6	Ret	4	22	7	5	35	7	4^{1}	8	6^{2}	14	5	81
9	(Czech Republic) Martin Prokop	Ret	Ret	5	6	8	6	10	Ret	7		10	8	9	44
10	(Spain) Dani Sordo	Ret			Ret	Ret				2		4	5		40
11	(Norway) Henning Solberg		7		5		7	9	9					Ret	26
12	(France) Bryan Bouffier	2						14		Ret		9			20
13	(Finland) Juho Hänninen		19		8		Ret	6	6					30	20
14	(New Zealand) Hayden Paddon						12	8	8		6		9	10	19
15	(Estonia) Ott Tänak		5	15	Ret	17	21	11	12	10	Ret			7	17
16	(Poland) Robert Kubica	Ret	24	Ret	Ret	6	8	20	34	Ret	9	Ret	17	11	14
17	(Mexico) Benito Guerra			6									18	EX	8
18	(Australia) Chris Atkinson			7							10				7
19	(Sweden) Pontus Tidemand		8		11					9		28			6
20	(Netherlands) Dennis Kuipers									8		11			4
21	(Slovakia) Jaroslav Melichárek	8					19			14					4
22	(Qatar) Nasser Al-Attiyah				9	10	Ret			17	11		10	17	4
23	(Italy) Lorenzo Bertelli	12	18	13	30	13	9		Ret	50	14		Ret	13	2
24	(Italy) Matteo Gamba	9										Ret			2
25	(Republic of Ireland) Craig Breen		9						Ret	DNS					2
26	(Ukraine) Yuriy Protasov	10	15	10	31	Ret	13		43	11	13	16	11	20	2
27	(Finland) Jari Ketomaa		12		10	21		12	11		12			12	1
28	(Estonia) Karl Kruuda		11		12		15	Ret	10				24	16	1
29	(United Arab Emirates) Khalid Al Qassimi		16		13		10						15		1
Pos.	Driver	MON (Monaco)	SWE (Sweden)	MEX (Mexico)	POR (Portugal)	ARG (Argentina)	ITA (Italy)	POL (Poland)	FIN (Finland)	GER (Germany)	AUS (Australia)	FRA (France)	ESP (Spain)	GBR (United Kingdom)	Points

Key
Colour	Result
Gold	Winner
Silver	2nd place
Bronze	3rd place
Green	Points finish
Blue	Non-points finish
Blue	Non-classified finish (NC)
Purple	Did not finish (Ret)
Black	Excluded (EX)
Black	Disqualified (DSQ)
White	Did not start (DNS)
White	Cancelled (C)
Blank	Withdrew entry from the event (WD)

Notes:
^{1 2 3} – Indicate position on Power Stage

=== FIA World Rally Championship for Co-Drivers ===
Pos.	Co-driver	MON (Monaco)	SWE (Sweden)	MEX (Mexico)	POR (Portugal)	ARG (Argentina)	ITA (Italy)	POL (Poland)	FIN (Finland)	GER (Germany)	AUS (Australia)	FRA (France)	ESP (Spain)	GBR (United Kingdom)	Points
1	(France) Julien Ingrassia	1^{2}	6	1^{1}	1^{1}	2^{1}	1^{3}	1^{3}	2^{1}	Ret	1^{2}	13^{1}	1	1	267
2	(Finland) Miikka Anttila	5^{1}	1^{2}	2^{2}	19^{2}	1^{3}	3^{2}	5^{3}	1^{2}	Ret	2^{1}	1^{3}	2^{1}	8^{1}	218
3	(Finland) Jarmo Lehtinen	Ret	4^{3}	8^{3}	2	9^{2}	Ret	4	5	5^{3}	5	5	3	2	126
4	(Sweden) Jonas Andersson	4	3^{1}	9	3^{1}	Ret	2	Ret	Ret	6	15	7	4	3^{3}	108
5	(Norway) Ola Floene		8		11		4^{1}	2^{2}	4	3	3	2	7^{3}	Ret	106
6	(Belgium) Nicolas Gilsoul	Ret	28	3	7	5	16	3	Ret	1^{2}	7	8	6	4^{2}	105
7	(Republic of Ireland) Paul Nagle	3^{3}	10	Ret	Ret	3	18	7	3^{3}	Ret	4^{3}	3	19^{2}	6	92
8	(United Kingdom) Daniel Barritt	6	Ret	4	22	7	5	35	7	4^{1}	8	6^{2}	14	5	81
9	(Finland) Mikko Markkula	7	2	19	4	4									48
10	(Czech Republic) Jan Tománek		Ret	5	6	8	6	10	Ret	7		10	8	9	44
11	(Spain) Marc Martí	Ret			Ret	Ret				2		4	5		40
12	(Austria) Ilka Minor		7		5		7	9	9					Ret	26
13	(France) Xavier Panseri	2						14		Ret		9			20
14	(Finland) Tomi Tuominen		19		8		Ret	6	6					30	20
15	(New Zealand) John Kennard						12	8	8		6		9	10	19
16	(Estonia) Raigo Mõlder		5	15	Ret	17	21	11	12	10	Ret			7	17
17	(Poland) Maciek Szczepaniak	Ret	24	Ret	Ret	6	8	20	34	Ret	9	Ret	17	11	14
18	(Spain) Borja Rozada			6					Ret				18		8
19	(Belgium) Stéphane Prévot			7						12	10			35	7
20	(Belgium) Robin Buysmans									8		11			4
21	(Slovakia) Erik Melichárek	8					19			14					4
22	(Italy) Giovanni Bernacchini				9	10	Ret			17	11		10	17	4
23	(Italy) Mitia Dotta	12	18	13	30	13	9		Ret	50	14		Ret	13	2
24	(Italy) Nicola Arena	9	26	17	19		25	29			16	Ret			2
25	(United Kingdom) Scott Martin		9						Ret	DNS				14	2
26	(Sweden) Emil Axelsson									9					2
27	(Ukraine) Pavlo Cherepin	10	15	10	31	Ret	13		43	11	13	16	11		2
28	(Finland) Kaj Lindstrom		12		10	21		12	11		12			12	1
29	(Estonia) Martin Järveoja		11		12			Ret	10				24	16	1
30	(United Kingdom) Chris Patterson		16		13		10						15		1
Pos.	Co-driver	MON (Monaco)	SWE (Sweden)	MEX (Mexico)	POR (Portugal)	ARG (Argentina)	ITA (Italy)	POL (Poland)	FIN (Finland)	GER (Germany)	AUS (Australia)	FRA (France)	ESP (Spain)	GBR (United Kingdom)	Points

Key
Colour	Result
Gold	Winner
Silver	2nd place
Bronze	3rd place
Green	Points finish
Blue	Non-points finish
Blue	Non-classified finish (NC)
Purple	Did not finish (Ret)
Black	Excluded (EX)
Black	Disqualified (DSQ)
White	Did not start (DNS)
White	Cancelled (C)
Blank	Withdrew entry from the event (WD)

Notes:
^{1 2 3} – Indicate position on Power Stage

=== FIA World Rally Championship for Manufacturers ===
Pos.	Manufacturer	No.	MON (Monaco)	SWE (Sweden)	MEX (Mexico)	POR (Portugal)	ARG (Argentina)	ITA (Italy)	POL (Poland)	FIN (Finland)	GER (Germany)	AUS (Australia)	FRA (France)	ESP (Spain)	GBR (United Kingdom)	Points
1	(Germany) Volkswagen Motorsport	1	1	5	1	1	2	1	1	2	Ret	1	11	1	1	447
1	(Germany) Volkswagen Motorsport	2	4	1	2	8	1	3	5	1	Ret	2	1	2	7	447
2	(France) Citroën Total Abu Dhabi World Rally Team	3	2	6	Ret	Ret	3	10	7	3	Ret	3	3	12	6	210
2	(France) Citroën Total Abu Dhabi World Rally Team	4	3	3	8	3	Ret	2	Ret	Ret	6	10	7	4	3	210
3	(United Kingdom) M-Sport World Rally Team	5	Ret	4	7	2	9	Ret	4	5	5	4	5	3	2	208
3	(United Kingdom) M-Sport World Rally Team	6	5	Ret	4	9	7	5	11	7	4	7	6	10	5	208
4	(South Korea) Hyundai Shell World Rally Team	7	Ret	9	3	6	5	9	3	Ret	1	6	8	6	4	187
4	(South Korea) Hyundai Shell World Rally Team	8	Ret	7	6	7	Ret	Ret	6	6	2	9	4	5	11	187
5	(Germany) Volkswagen Motorsport II	9	6	2	9	4	4	4	2	4	3		2	7	Ret	133
6	(Czech Republic) Jipocar Czech National Team	21	Ret	Ret	5	5	8	6	9	Ret	7		10	8	8	49
7	(South Korea) Hyundai Motorsport N	20				Ret		8	8	8	Ret	5	9	9	9	28
8	(United Kingdom) RK M-Sport World Rally Team	14	Ret	8	Ret	Ret	6	7	10	9	Ret	8	Ret	11	10	26
Pos.	Manufacturer	No.	MON (Monaco)	SWE (Sweden)	MEX (Mexico)	POR (Portugal)	ARG (Argentina)	ITA (Italy)	POL (Poland)	FIN (Finland)	GER (Germany)	AUS (Australia)	FRA (France)	ESP (Spain)	GBR (United Kingdom)	Points

Key
Colour	Result
Gold	Winner
Silver	2nd place
Bronze	3rd place
Green	Points finish
Blue	Non-points finish
Blue	Non-classified finish (NC)
Purple	Did not finish (Ret)
Black	Excluded (EX)
Black	Disqualified (DSQ)
White	Did not start (DNS)
White	Cancelled (C)
Blank	Withdrew entry from the event (WD)

Notes:
^{1 2 3} – Indicate position on Power Stage
