= 2011 Acropolis Rally =

2011 Acropolis Rally 57th Acropolis Rally
Round 7 of the 2011 World Rally Championship season
← Previous event	Next event →
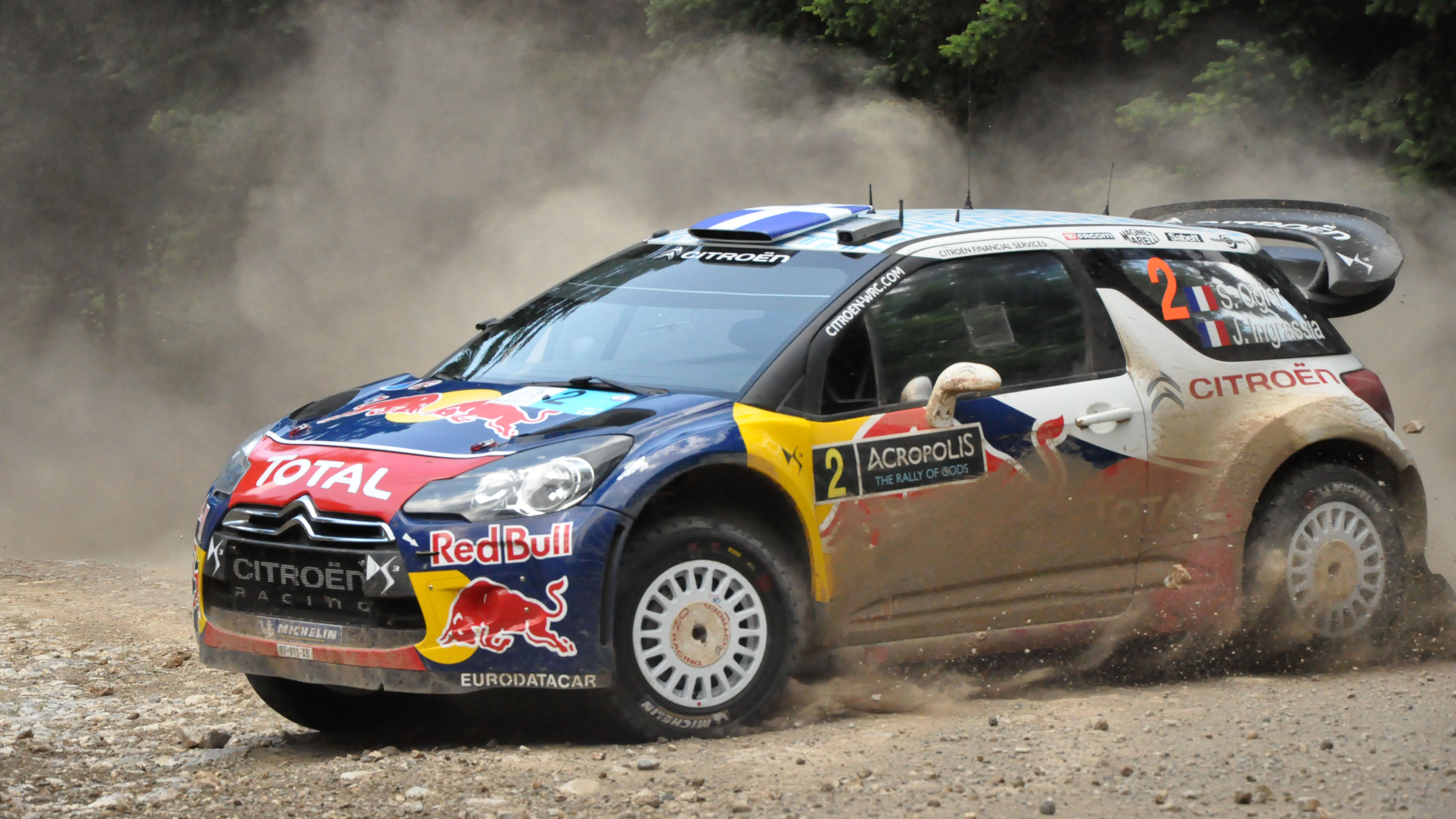
- Eventual winner Sébastien Ogier driving a Citroën DS3 WRC on SS3.
- Host country: Greece
- Rally base: Loutraki, Greece
- Dates run: June 17 – 19 2011
- Stages: 18 (348.80 km; 216.73 miles)
- Stage surface: Gravel
- Overall distance: 1,217.82 km (756.72 miles)

Statistics
- Crews: 42 at start, 35 at finish

Overall results
- Overall winner: (France) Sébastien Ogier (France) Citroën World Rally Team

The 2011 Acropolis Rally was the seventh round of the 2011 World Rally Championship season. The rally took place over 17–19 June, and was based in Loutraki, 85 kilometres (52.8 mi) outside the country's capital, Athens. The rally was also the fourth round of the Super 2000 World Rally Championship. The Acropolis Rally returned to the WRC calendar for the first time since 2009, after the event was not run in 2010.

Sébastien Ogier took his third victory in five starts, having overtaken team-mate Sébastien Loeb on the final day of the event. Ogier's winning margin was 10.5 seconds, with Mikko Hirvonen a further three seconds behind in third place. Juho Hänninen claimed SWRC honours with an overall eighth-place finish.

== Results ==
=== Event standings ===
Pos.	Driver	Co-driver	Car	Time	Difference	Points
1.	(France) Sébastien Ogier	(France) Julien Ingrassia	Citroën DS3 WRC	4:04:44.3	0.0	28
2.	(France) Sébastien Loeb	(Monaco) Daniel Elena	Citroën DS3 WRC	4:04:54.8	10.5	20
3.	(Finland) Mikko Hirvonen	(Finland) Jarmo Lehtinen	Ford Fiesta RS WRC	4:04:57.8	13.5	16
4.	(Norway) Petter Solberg	(United Kingdom) Chris Patterson	Citroën DS3 WRC	4:05:23.1	38.8	12
5.	(Norway) Henning Solberg	(Austria) Ilka Minor	Ford Fiesta RS WRC	4:10:09.0	5:24.7	10
6.	(United Kingdom) Matthew Wilson	(United Kingdom) Scott Martin	Ford Fiesta RS WRC	4:11:39.0	6:54.7	8
7.	(Finland) Kimi Räikkönen	(Finland) Kaj Lindström	Citroën DS3 WRC	4:13:13.7	8:29.4	6
8.	(Finland) Juho Hänninen	(Finland) Mikko Markkula	Škoda Fabia S2000	4:16:19.0	11:34.7	4
9.	(Finland) Jari-Matti Latvala	(Finland) Miikka Anttila	Ford Fiesta RS WRC	4:17:53.1	13:08.8	2
10.	(Netherlands) Dennis Kuipers	(Belgium) Frédéric Miclotte	Ford Fiesta RS WRC	4:19:54.4	15:10.1	1
SWRC
1. (8.)	(Finland) Juho Hänninen	(Finland) Mikko Markkula	Škoda Fabia S2000	4:16:19.0	0.0	25
2. (11.)	(Portugal) Bernardo Sousa	(Portugal) António Costa	Ford Fiesta S2000	4:21:13.6	4:54.6	18
3. (13.)	(Hungary) Frigyes Turán	(Hungary) Gábor Zsiros	Ford Fiesta S2000	4:22:36.3	6:17.3	15
4. (14.)	(Germany) Hermann Gassner, Jr.	(Germany) Kathi Wüstenhagen	Škoda Fabia S2000	4:23:27.7	7:08.7	12
5. (15.)	(Czech Republic) Martin Prokop	(Czech Republic) Jan Tománek	Ford Fiesta S2000	4:25:17.4	8:58.4	10
6. (16.)	(Qatar) Nasser Al-Attiyah	(Italy) Giovanni Bernacchini	Ford Fiesta S2000	4:26:23.9	10:04.9	8
7. (18.)	(Norway) Eyvind Brynildsen	(Norway) Cato Menkerud	Škoda Fabia S2000	4:37:41.5	21:22.5	6
8. (23.)	(Estonia) Karl Kruuda	(Estonia) Martin Järveoja	Škoda Fabia S2000	5:06:22.1	50:03.1	4
9. (24.)	(Andorra) Albert Llovera	(Spain) Diego Vallejo	Abarth Grande Punto S2000	5:10:50.5	54:31.5	2

=== Special stages ===
All dates and times are EEST (UTC+3).

Day	Stage	Time	Name	Length	Winner	Time	Avg. spd.	Rally leader
Leg 1 (17 June)	SS1	9:08	Thiva 1	23.60 km	(Norway) Petter Solberg	16:39.9	84.97 km/h	(Norway) Petter Solberg
Leg 1 (17 June)	SS2	11:01	Elatia	39.10 km	(Norway) Petter Solberg	27:42.6	84.66 km/h	(Norway) Petter Solberg
Leg 1 (17 June)	SS3	13:39	Eleftherohori	18.10 km	(Norway) Petter Solberg	11:20.6	95.74 km/h	(Norway) Petter Solberg
Leg 1 (17 June)	SS4	14:28	Rengini	11.88 km	(Norway) Petter Solberg	8:40.1	92.95 km/h	(Norway) Petter Solberg
Leg 1 (17 June)	SS5	16:15	Thiva 2	23.60 km	(France) Sébastien Ogier	16:39.5	85.00 km/h	(Norway) Petter Solberg
Leg 1 (17 June)	SS6	17:48	Mavrolimni	25.05 km	(France) Sébastien Loeb	18:18.5	82.09 km/h	(Norway) Petter Solberg
Leg 2 (18 June)	SS7	11:02	Klenia Mycenae 1	17.41 km	(France) Sébastien Ogier	11:36.2	90.03 km/h	(Norway) Petter Solberg
Leg 2 (18 June)	SS8	12:05	Ghymno 1	26.28 km	(France) Sébastien Ogier	18:34.3	84.90 km/h	(Norway) Petter Solberg
Leg 2 (18 June)	SS9	13:20	Kefalari 1	18.40 km	(France) Sébastien Ogier	13:42.9	80.50 km/h	(Norway) Petter Solberg
Leg 2 (18 June)	SS10	16:20	Klenia Mycenae 2	17.41 km	(Finland) Jari-Matti Latvala	11:20.0	92.17 km/h	(France) Sébastien Ogier
Leg 2 (18 June)	SS11	17:23	Ghymno 2	26.28 km	(France) Sébastien Loeb	18:11.6	86.67 km/h	(France) Sébastien Ogier
Leg 2 (18 June)	SS12	18:38	Kefalari 2	18.40 km	(France) Sébastien Ogier	13:25.2	82.27 km/h	(France) Sébastien Ogier
Leg 2 (18 June)	SS13	21:33	Nea Politia	17.71 km	(Finland) Jari-Matti Latvala	12:50.9	82.70 km/h	(France) Sébastien Loeb
Leg 3 (19 June)	SS14	9:03	Aghii Theodori 1	19.42 km	(Finland) Jari-Matti Latvala	12:49.5	90.85 km/h	(France) Sébastien Ogier
Leg 3 (19 June)	SS15	9:34	New Pissia 1	11.37 km	(Finland) Jari-Matti Latvala	8:15.1	82.67 km/h	(France) Sébastien Loeb
Leg 3 (19 June)	SS16	12:05	Aghii Theodori 2	19.42 km	(Finland) Mikko Hirvonen	12:33.7	92.76 km/h	(France) Sébastien Ogier
Leg 3 (19 June)	SS17	12:36	New Pissia 2	11.37 km	(Finland) Jari-Matti Latvala	8:04.5	84.48 km/h	(France) Sébastien Ogier
Leg 3 (19 June)	SS18	14:11	New Loutraki (Power stage)	4.00 km	(France) Sébastien Ogier	2:22.7	100.91 km/h	(France) Sébastien Ogier

=== Power Stage ===
The "Power stage" was a live, televised 4.00 km (2.49 mi) stage at the end of the rally, held in Loutraki.

Pos	Driver	Time	Diff.	Avg. speed	Points
1	(France) Sébastien Ogier	2:22.7	0.0	100.91 km/h	3
2	(France) Sébastien Loeb	2:22.7	0.0	100.91 km/h	2
3	(Finland) Mikko Hirvonen	2:23.1	+0.4	100.63 km/h	1
