= 2011 Jordan Rally =

2011 Jordan Rally 29th Jordan Rally
Round 4 of the 2011 World Rally Championship season
← Previous event	Next event →
- Host country: Jordan
- Rally base: Dead Sea Centre, Jordan
- Dates run: April 14 – 16 2011
- Stages: 20 (333.04 km; 206.94 miles)
- Stage surface: Gravel
- Overall distance: 1,008.89 km (626.90 miles)

Statistics
- Crews: 31 at start, 23 at finish

Overall results
- Overall winner: (France) Sébastien Ogier (France) Citroën World Rally Team

The 2011 Jordan Rally was the fourth round of the 2011 World Rally Championship season. The rally took place over 14–16 April, and was based beside the Dead Sea, some 50 kilometres (31 mi) from the country's capital, Amman. The rally was also the second round of the Super 2000.

The rally concluded with the closest finish in the history of the World Rally Championship. Heading into the final 10.50 km (6.52 mi) Power Stage, Jari-Matti Latvala held a lead of 0.5 seconds over Sébastien Ogier, but Ogier overhauled his rival by just 0.2 seconds after winning the stage by 0.04 seconds over Latvala's Ford teammate Mikko Hirvonen, and crucially, 0.7 seconds over Latvala. Sébastien Loeb finished third ahead of Hirvonen. Bernardo Sousa won the Super 2000 class with a tenth place overall finish.

== Results ==
=== Event standings ===
Pos.	Driver	Co-driver	Car	Time	Difference	Points
Overall
1.	(France) Sébastien Ogier	(France) Julien Ingrassia	Citroën DS3 WRC	2:48:28.2	0.0	28
2.	(Finland) Jari-Matti Latvala	(Finland) Miikka Anttila	Ford Fiesta RS WRC	2:48:28.4	0.2	18
3.	(France) Sébastien Loeb	(Monaco) Daniel Elena	Citroën DS3 WRC	2:48:55.9	27.7	16
4.	(Finland) Mikko Hirvonen	(Finland) Jarmo Lehtinen	Ford Fiesta RS WRC	2:51:12.9	2:44.7	14
5.	(United Kingdom) Matthew Wilson	(United Kingdom) Scott Martin	Ford Fiesta RS WRC	2:54:13.1	5:44.9	10
6.	(Finland) Kimi Räikkönen	(Finland) Kaj Lindström	Citroën DS3 WRC	2:54:43.1	6:14.9	8
7.	(Argentina) Federico Villagra	(Argentina) Jorge Pérez Companc	Ford Fiesta RS WRC	2:57:46.9	9:18.7	6
8.	(United Arab Emirates) Khalid Al Qassimi	(United Kingdom) Michael Orr	Ford Fiesta RS WRC	2:58:11.9	9:43.7	4
9.	(Netherlands) Dennis Kuipers	(Belgium) Bjorn Degandt	Ford Fiesta RS WRC	3:02:55.7	14:27.5	2
10.	(Portugal) Bernardo Sousa	(Portugal) António Costa	Ford Fiesta S2000	3:03:33.7	15:05.5	1
SWRC
1. (10.)	(Portugal) Bernardo Sousa	(Portugal) António Costa	Ford Fiesta S2000	3:03:33.7	0.0	25
2. (11.)	(Estonia) Karl Kruuda	(Estonia) Martin Järveoja	Škoda Fabia S2000	3:03:55.4	21.7	18
3. (12.)	(Germany) Hermann Gassner, Jr.	(Germany) Kathi Wüstenhagen	Škoda Fabia S2000	3:05:55.8	2:22.1	15
4. (17.)	(Andorra) Albert Llovera	(Spain) Diego Vallejo	Abarth Grande Punto S2000	3:21:07.2	17:33.5	12
5. (18.)	(Norway) Eyvind Brynildsen	(Norway) Cato Menkerud	Škoda Fabia S2000	3:26:55.2	23:21.5	10

=== Special stages ===
Day	Stage	Time	Name	Length	Winner	Time	Avg. spd.	Rally leader
Leg 1 (14 Apr)	SS1	11:33	Wadi Shueib 1	8.65 km	Leg cancelled			
Leg 1 (14 Apr)	SS2	12:16	Mount Nebo 1	11.09 km	Leg cancelled			
Leg 1 (14 Apr)	SS3	13:03	Ma'in 1	17.00 km	Leg cancelled			
Leg 1 (14 Apr)	SS4	15:30	Wadi Shueib 2	8.65 km	Leg cancelled			
Leg 1 (14 Apr)	SS5	16:13	Mount Nebo 2	11.09 km	Leg cancelled			
Leg 1 (14 Apr)	SS6	17:00	Ma'in 2	17.00 km	Leg cancelled			
Leg 2 (15 Apr)	SS7	09:03	Suwayma 1	13.50 km	(France) Sébastien Loeb	7:01.0	115.44 km/h	(France) Sébastien Loeb
Leg 2 (15 Apr)	SS8	09:46	Kafrain 1	17.20 km	(Norway) Petter Solberg	12:11.6	84.64 km/h	(France) Sébastien Loeb (France) Sébastien Ogier
Leg 2 (15 Apr)	SS9	10:49	Jordan River 1	41.45 km	(France) Sébastien Ogier	27:32.6	90.29 km/h	(France) Sébastien Ogier
Leg 2 (15 Apr)	SS10	13:37	Suwayma 2	13.50 km	(Finland) Jari-Matti Latvala	6:59.0	115.99 km/h	(France) Sébastien Ogier
Leg 2 (15 Apr)	SS11	14:20	Kafrain 2	17.20 km	(Finland) Jari-Matti Latvala	11:48.2	87.43 km/h	(France) Sébastien Ogier
Leg 2 (15 Apr)	SS12	15:23	Jordan River 2	41.45 km	(France) Sébastien Ogier	27:13.5	91.35 km/h	(France) Sébastien Ogier
Leg 3 (16 Apr)	SS13	08:20	Yakrut 1	14.16 km	(France) Sébastien Loeb	8:30.6	99.84 km/h	(France) Sébastien Ogier
Leg 3 (16 Apr)	SS14	08:50	Bahath 1	12.53 km	(Finland) Mikko Hirvonen	9:30.0	79.14 km/h	(France) Sébastien Ogier
Leg 3 (16 Apr)	SS15	09:35	Mahes 1	20.44 km	(Finland) Mikko Hirvonen	14:33.0	84.29 km/h	(France) Sébastien Ogier
Leg 3 (16 Apr)	SS16	10:18	Baptism Site 1	10.50 km	(France) Sébastien Loeb	5:21.7	117.50 km/h	(France) Sébastien Ogier
Leg 3 (16 Apr)	SS17	12:18	Yakrut 2	14.16 km	(Finland) Jari-Matti Latvala	8:15.8	102.82 km/h	(France) Sébastien Ogier
Leg 3 (16 Apr)	SS18	12:48	Bahath 2	12.53 km	(Finland) Jari-Matti Latvala	9:10.5	81.94 km/h	(France) Sébastien Ogier
Leg 3 (16 Apr)	SS19	13:33	Mahes 2	20.44 km	(Finland) Jari-Matti Latvala	14:09.1	86.66 km/h	(Finland) Jari-Matti Latvala
Leg 3 (16 Apr)	SS20	15:00	Baptism Site 2 (Power stage)	10.50 km	(France) Sébastien Ogier	5:21.7	117.50 km/h	(France) Sébastien Ogier

=== Power Stage ===
The "Power stage" was a live, televised 10.50 km (6.52 mi) stage at the end of the rally, held near the Dead Sea Centre.

Pos	Driver	Time	Diff.	Avg. speed	Points
1	(France) Sébastien Ogier	5:21.7	0.0	117.50 km/h	3
2	(Finland) Mikko Hirvonen	5:21.7	0.0	117.50 km/h	2
3	(France) Sébastien Loeb	5:22.0	0.3	117.39 km/h	1
