= Alex Gelsomino =

Italian rally co-driver (born 1973)

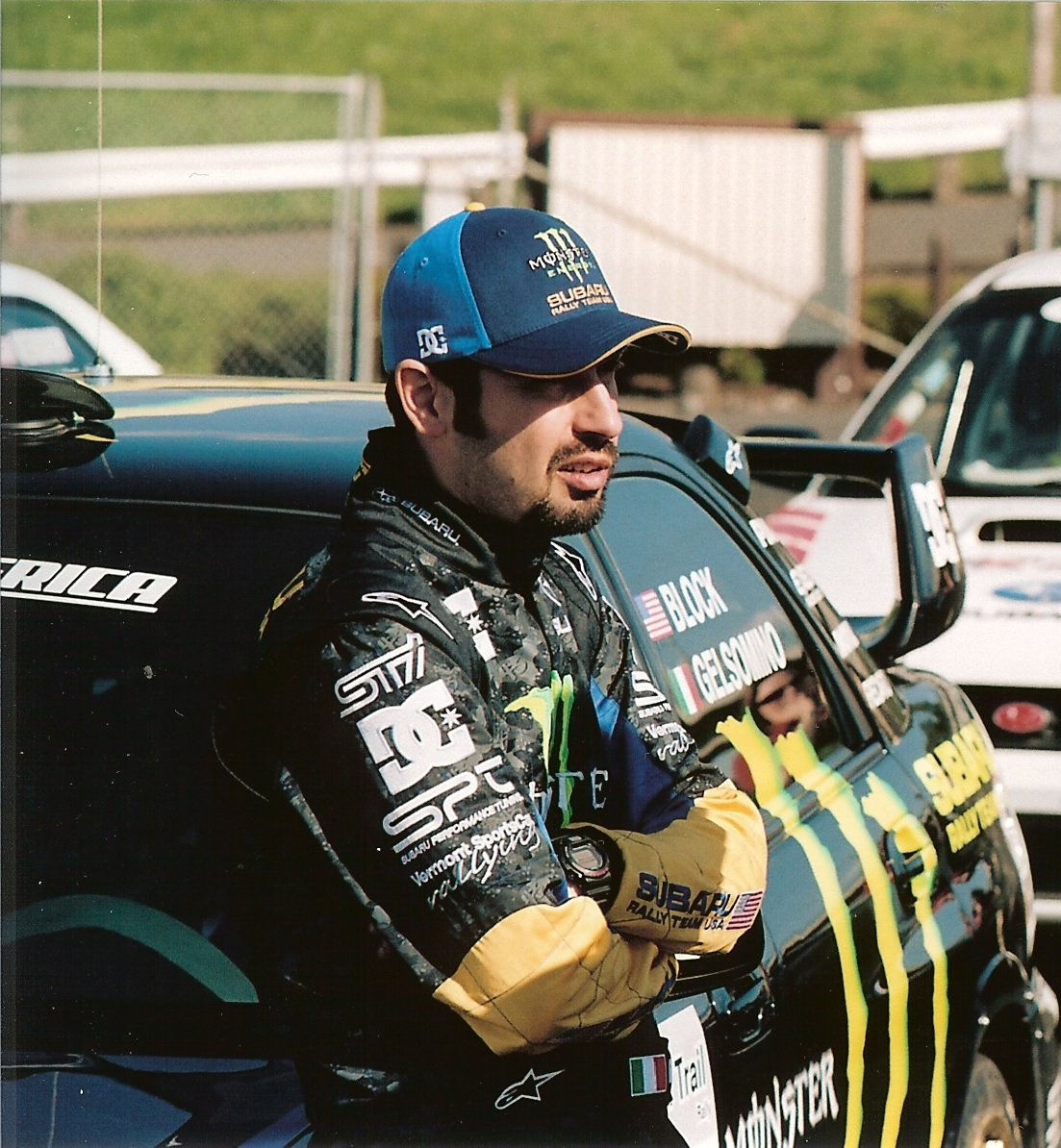
- Alex Gelsomino in 2007

Personal information
- Nationality: (Italy) Italian
- Born: 22 March 1973 (age 53); Palermo, Italy

World Rally Championship record
- Years active: 2007–2008, 2010–2016, 2018, 2026
- Driver: (United States) Ken Block (Kuwait) Salah Bin Eidan (United States) Will Hudson (United Kingdom) Gus Greensmith (United States) Conner Martell
- Teams: Rally FaNZ; Subaru Rally Team USA; Monster World Rally Team; Sirbb Kuwait; M-Sport World Rally Team; 2C Junior Team
- Rallies: 40
- Rally wins: 0
- Podiums: 0
- Stage wins: 0
- First rally: 2007 Rally México
- Last rally: 2026 Rally Finland

Alessandro Gelsomino (born 22 March 1973) is an Italian rally co-driver. Born in Palermo, he is best known of his 17-year association with the late Ken Block in rallying from 2005, until Block's death in 2023. He was a constant in over 350 rally races worldwide, including being in the World Rally Championship (WRC) and the American Rally Association (ARA).

He's currently participating in competition alongside Lia Block and Conner Martell, and has notably co-driven with Travis Pastrana.

== Early life ==
Gelsomino is married to fellow co-driver Rhianon Gelsomino, the sister of the Australian rally driver Brendan Reeves.

== Complete WRC results ==
Year	Entrant	Car	1	2	3	4	5	6	7	8	9	10	11	12	13	14	15	16	Pos.	Points
2007	Ken Block	Subaru Impreza WRX STI	MON	SWE	NOR	MEX; 28	POR	ARG	ITA	GRE	FIN	GER							NC	0
2007	Rally FaNZ	Subaru Impreza WRX STI											NZL; 56	ESP	FRA	JPN	IRE	GBR	NC	0
2008	Subaru Rally Team USA	Subaru Impreza WRX STI	MON	SWE	MEX	ARG	JOR	ITA	GRE	TUR	FIN	GER	NZL; 30	ESP	FRA	JPN	GBR		NC	0
2010	Monster World Rally Team	Ford Focus RS WRC 08	SWE	MEX; 18	JOR	TUR; 24	NZL	POR; Ret	BUL	FIN	GER; Ret	JPN	FRA; 12	ESP; 9	GBR; 21				19th	2
2011	Monster World Rally Team	Ford Fiesta RS WRC	SWE; 14	MEX; 12	POR; DNS	JOR	ITA	ARG; 18	GRE	FIN	GER; 17	AUS; 19	FRA; 8	ESP; Ret	GBR; 9				22nd	6
2012	Monster World Rally Team	Ford Fiesta RS WRC	MON	SWE	MEX; 9	POR	ARG	GRE	NZL; 9	FIN; Ret	GER	GBR	FRA	ITA	ESP				29th	4
2013	Hoonigan Racing Division	Ford Fiesta RS WRC	MON	SWE	MEX; 7	POR	ARG	GRE	ITA	FIN	GER	AUS	FRA	ESP	GBR				21st	6
2014	Sirbb Kuwait	Ford Fiesta R5	MON	SWE	MEX	POR; 39	ARG	ITA; 27	POL	FIN	GER	AUS	FRA						NC	0
2014	M-Sport World Rally Team	Ford Fiesta RS WRC												ESP; 12	GBR				NC	0
2015	Will Hudson	Ford Fiesta R2T	MON	SWE	MEX	ARG	POR; Ret	ITA	POL; Ret	FIN; Ret	GER; 46	AUS	FRA	ESP					NC	0
2015	Gus Greensmith	Ford Fiesta R2T													GBR; 55				NC	0
2016	Gus Greensmith	Ford Fiesta R2T	MON	SWE	MEX	ARG	POR; Ret	ITA	POL; 35	FIN; Ret	GER; 63	CHN; C	FRA	ESP	GBR	AUS			NC	0
2018	Gus Greensmith	Ford Fiesta R5	MON	SWE	MEX	FRA	ARG	POR	ITA	FIN	GER	TUR; Ret	GBR; 11						NC	0
2018	Hoonigan Racing Division	Ford Fiesta WRC												ESP; Ret	AUS				NC	0
2026	2C Junior Team	Lancia Ypsilon Rally2 HF Integrale	MON	SWE	KEN	CRO	ESP	POR	JPN	GRE; Ret	EST	FIN; 23	PAR	CHL	ITA	SAU			NC	0
