= Ice 1 Racing =

Auto racing team

ICE 1 Racing
- Full name: ICE 1 Racing
- Base: Versailles, France
- Team principal(s): Benoit Nogier
- Drivers: (Finland) Kimi Räikkönen
- Co-drivers: (Finland) Kaj Lindström
- Chassis: Citroën DS3 WRC
- Tyres: Michelin

World Rally Championship history
- Debut: 2011 Rally Sweden
- Last event: 2011 Wales Rally GB
- Manufacturers' Championships: 0
- Drivers' Championships: 0
- Rally wins: 0

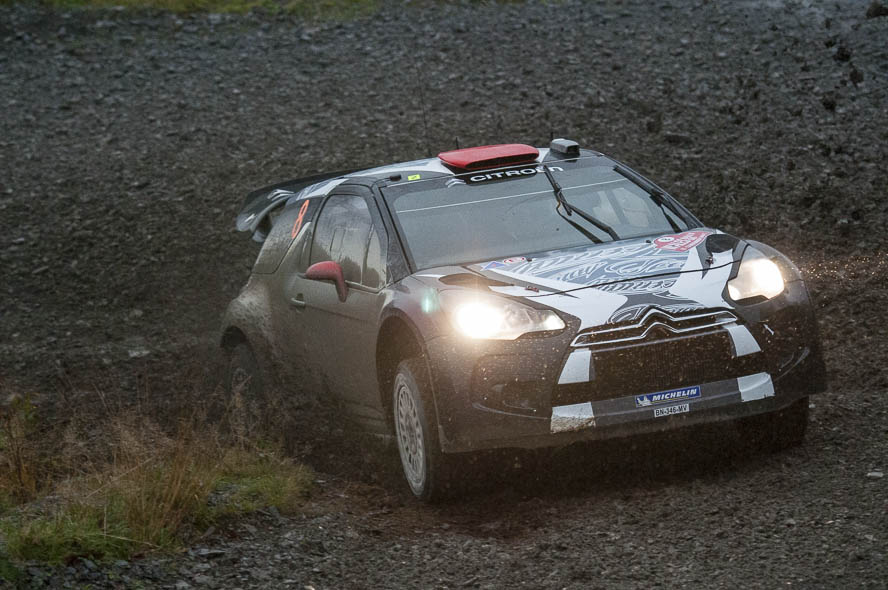
Kimi Räikkönen at 2011 Rally GB.

ICE 1 Racing was a team competing in the World Rally Championship with Finnish driver Kimi Räikkönen. The team was based at Citroën Racing's headquarters in Versailles, France.

2007 Formula One World Champion Räikkönen drove for the Citroën Junior Team in his first World Rally Championship season in 2010. For 2011 the Junior Team was disbanded and Räikkönen was entered for the 2011 season under the Ice 1 Racing name in a Citroën DS3 WRC. Citroën Racing Technologies boss Benoit Nogier remained as Räikkönen's team principal, a role he held at the Citroën Junior Team.

Räikkönen subsequently set up a motocross team using the ICE 1 Racing name. The team is headed by Antti Pyrhönen and competes in the Motocross World Championship.

== Complete WRC results ==
Year	Car	No	Driver	1	2	3	4	5	6	7	8	9	10	11	12	13	WDC	Points	TC	Points
2011	Citroën DS3 WRC	8	(Finland) Kimi Räikkönen	SWE; 8	MEX	POR; 7	JOR; 6	ITA	ARG	GRE; 7	FIN; 9	GER; 6	AUS; WD	FRA; Ret	ESP; Ret	GBR; Ret	10th	34	NC *	48

* Team was not classified having competed in less than two non-European WRC rounds
