= 2011 Rallye de France =

2011 Rallye de France Rallye de France – Alsace
Round 11 of the 2011 World Rally Championship season
← Previous event	Next event →
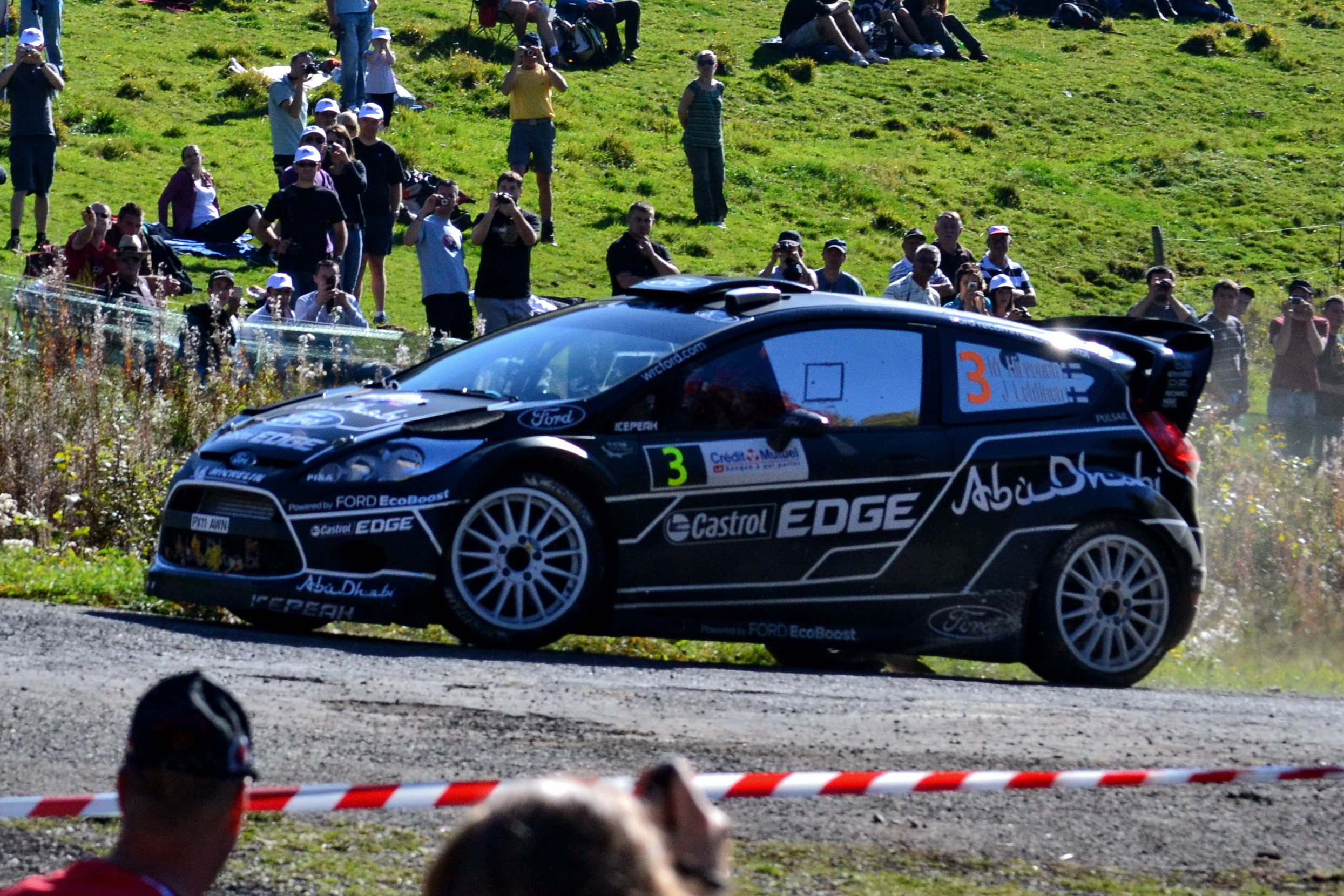
- Mikko Hirvonen in a Ford Fiesta RS WRC with a special one-off black livery
- Host country: France
- Rally base: Strasbourg, Alsace
- Dates run: September 30 – October 2 2011
- Stages: 23 (348.13 km; 216.32 miles)
- Stage surface: Asphalt
- Overall distance: 1,296.08 km (805.35 miles)

Statistics
- Crews: 66 at start, 35 at finish

Overall results
- Overall winner: (France) Sébastien Ogier (France) Citroën World Rally Team

The 2011 Rallye de France – Alsace was the eleventh round of the 2011 World Rally Championship season. The rally took place over 30 September – 2 October, and was based in Strasbourg, the capital city of the Alsace region of France. The rally was also the seventh round of the Super 2000 World Rally Championship, and the fifth round of the WRC Academy.

Sébastien Ogier took his fifth WRC win of the season, having taken the rally lead on the second day after battling with Dani Sordo and Petter Solberg. His victory also moved him to within three points of his team-mate and drivers' championship leader Sébastien Loeb, after Loeb's retirement on day one due to an engine problem. Sordo took Mini's best result since their return to the sport, in second position with Solberg completing the podium on-the-road.

Solberg was later disqualified from the event after his car was found to be underweight, promoting Mikko Hirvonen to the podium, and with the three extra points gained, into a tie with Loeb for the championship lead. Jari-Matti Latvala finished fourth, ahead of Dennis Kuipers, who took the best WRC result for a Dutch driver. Ott Tänak won the SWRC class for the third time in 2011, and Alastair Fisher took a maiden win in the WRC Academy.

== Results ==
=== Event standings ===
Pos.	Driver	Co-driver	Car	Time	Difference	Points
Overall
1.	(France) Sébastien Ogier	(France) Julien Ingrassia	Citroën DS3 WRC	3:06:20.4	0.0	26
2.	(Spain) Dani Sordo	(Spain) Carlos del Barrio	Mini John Cooper Works WRC	3:06:26.7	6.3	20
3.	(Finland) Mikko Hirvonen	(Finland) Jarmo Lehtinen	Ford Fiesta RS WRC	3:09:47.0	3:26.6	15
4.	(Finland) Jari-Matti Latvala	(Finland) Miikka Anttila	Ford Fiesta RS WRC	3:09:50.7	3:30.3	15
5.	(Netherlands) Dennis Kuipers	(Belgium) Frédéric Miclotte	Ford Fiesta RS WRC	3:13:02.4	6:42.0	10
6.	(Norway) Henning Solberg	(Austria) Ilka Minor	Ford Fiesta RS WRC	3:13:28.7	7:08.3	8
7.	(Norway) Mads Østberg	(Sweden) Jonas Andersson	Ford Fiesta RS WRC	3:14:18.7	7:58.3	6
8.	(United States) Ken Block	(United States) Alex Gelsomino	Ford Fiesta RS WRC	3:14:45.9	8:25.5	4
9.	(France) Pierre Campana	(France) Sabrina De Castelli	Mini John Cooper Works WRC	3:14:59.1	8:38.7	2
10.	(United Kingdom) Matthew Wilson	(United Kingdom) Scott Martin	Ford Fiesta RS WRC	3:16:21.2	10:00.8	1
SWRC
1. (11.)	(Estonia) Ott Tänak	(Estonia) Kuldar Sikk	Ford Fiesta S2000	3:17:52.1	0.0	25
2. (13.)	(Norway) Eyvind Brynildsen	(Finland) Timo Alanne	Škoda Fabia S2000	3:20:25.8	2:33.7	18
3. (14.)	(Czech Republic) Martin Prokop	(Czech Republic) Jan Tománek	Ford Fiesta S2000	3:20:32.8	2:40.7	15
4. (15.)	(Portugal) Bernando Sousa	(Portugal) Paulo Babo	Ford Fiesta S2000	3:22:27.0	4:34.9	12
5. (26.)	(Finland) Juho Hänninen	(Finland) Mikko Markkula	Škoda Fabia S2000	3:49:21.6	31:29.5	10
6. (27.)	(France) Julien Maurin	(France) Olivier Ural	Ford Fiesta S2000	3:49:26.1	31:34.0	8
WRC Academy^{†}
1.	(United Kingdom) Alastair Fisher	(United Kingdom) Daniel Barritt	Ford Fiesta R2	3:06:01.5	0.0	28
2.	(Spain) José Antonio Suárez	(Spain) Cándido Carrera	Ford Fiesta R2	3:06:42.0	40.5	19
3.	(Spain) Yeray Lemes	(Spain) Rogelio Peñate	Ford Fiesta R2	3:10:29.2	4:27.7	21
4.	(Germany) Sepp Wiegand	(Germany) Claudia Harloff	Ford Fiesta R2	3:12:23.2	6:21.7	0
5.	(Australia) Molly Taylor	(United Kingdom) Sebastian Marshall	Ford Fiesta R2	3:24:06.0	18:04.5	10
6.	(Netherlands) Timo van der Marel	(Netherlands) Erwin Berkhof	Ford Fiesta R2	3:36:39.3	30:37.8	8
7.	(Estonia) Miko-Ove Niinemäe	(Estonia) Timo Kasesalu	Ford Fiesta R2	3:38:49.0	32:47.5	6
8.	(Sweden) Fredrik Åhlin	(Sweden) Bjorn Nilsson	Ford Fiesta R2	3:42:34.7	36:33.2	4

† – The WRC Academy featured the first two days of the rally.

=== Special stages ===
All dates and times are CEST (UTC+2).

Day	Stage	Time	Name	Length	Winner	Time	Avg. spd.	Rally leader
Leg 1 (30 September)	SS1	7:48	Klevener 1	9.68 km	(France) Sébastien Loeb	5:41.7	101.98 km/h	(France) Sébastien Loeb
Leg 1 (30 September)	SS2	8:14	Ungersberg 1	15.45 km	(France) Sébastien Ogier	9:03.5	102.34 km/h	(France) Sébastien Loeb
Leg 1 (30 September)	SS3	9:19	Pays d'Ormont 1	36.00 km	(France) Sébastien Ogier	19:26.7	111.08 km/h	(France) Sébastien Ogier
Leg 1 (30 September)	SS4	10:12	Salm 1	13.06 km	(Finland) Jari-Matti Latvala	7:03.1	111.12 km/h	(France) Sébastien Ogier
Leg 1 (30 September)	SS5	13:23	Klevener 2	9.68 km	(France) Sébastien Ogier	5:42.7	101.69 km/h	(France) Sébastien Ogier
Leg 1 (30 September)	SS6	13:49	Ungersberg 2	15.45 km	(Spain) Dani Sordo (Norway) Petter Solberg	9:04.9	102.07 km/h	(France) Sébastien Ogier
Leg 1 (30 September)	SS7	14:54	Pays d'Ormont 2	36.00 km	(Norway) Petter Solberg	19:33.4	110.45 km/h	(Norway) Petter Solberg
Leg 1 (30 September)	SS8	15:47	Salm 2	13.06 km	(Spain) Dani Sordo	7:03.8	110.94 km/h	(Spain) Dani Sordo
Leg 2 (1 October)	SS9	8:23	Hohlandsbourg 1	9.87 km	(France) Sébastien Ogier	5:19.6	111.18 km/h	(Spain) Dani Sordo
Leg 2 (1 October)	SS10	8:41	Firstplan 1	16.50 km	(Norway) Petter Solberg	8:18.0	119.28 km/h	(Norway) Petter Solberg
Leg 2 (1 October)	SS11	9:10	Vallée de Munster 1	22.26 km	(France) Sébastien Ogier	11:15.0	118.72 km/h	(France) Sébastien Ogier
Leg 2 (1 October)	SS12	10:33	Grand Ballon 1	24.02 km	(Spain) Dani Sordo	13:28.1	107.01 km/h	(Spain) Dani Sordo
Leg 2 (1 October)	SS13	13:02	Hohlandsbourg 2	9.87 km	(Norway) Petter Solberg (France) Sébastien Ogier	5:24.4	109.53 km/h	(France) Sébastien Ogier
Leg 2 (1 October)	SS14	13:20	Firstplan 2	16.50 km	(France) Sébastien Ogier	8:16.3	119.69 km/h	(France) Sébastien Ogier
Leg 2 (1 October)	SS15	13:49	Vallée de Munster 2	22.26 km	(France) Sébastien Ogier	11:17.6	118.26 km/h	(France) Sébastien Ogier
Leg 2 (1 October)	SS16	15:12	Grand Ballon 2	24.02 km	(Finland) Jari-Matti Latvala	13:31.5	106.56 km/h	(France) Sébastien Ogier
Leg 2 (1 October)	SS17	16:56	Mulhouse	3.09 km	(France) Sébastien Ogier	2:21.9	78.39 km/h	(France) Sébastien Ogier
Leg 3 (2 October)	SS18	7:18	Gravière de Bischwiller 1	5.52 km	(Finland) Jari-Matti Latvala	2:51.0	116.21 km/h	(France) Sébastien Ogier
Leg 3 (2 October)	SS19	8:27	Vignoble de Cleebourg 1	10.61 km	(Spain) Dani Sordo	5:54.6	107.72 km/h	(France) Sébastien Ogier
Leg 3 (2 October)	SS20	9:48	Haguenau 1	4.20 km	(Finland) Jari-Matti Latvala	3:11.6	78.91 km/h	(France) Sébastien Ogier
Leg 3 (2 October)	SS21	10:18	Gravière de Bischwiller 2	5.52 km	(Finland) Jari-Matti Latvala	2:47.2	118.85 km/h	(France) Sébastien Ogier
Leg 3 (2 October)	SS22	11:27	Vignoble de Cleebourg 2	10.61 km	(Finland) Jari-Matti Latvala (France) Sébastien Ogier	5:50.3	109.04 km/h	(France) Sébastien Ogier
Leg 3 (2 October)	SS23	13:08	Haguenau 2 (Power stage)	4.20 km	(Finland) Jari-Matti Latvala	3:09.4	79.83 km/h	(France) Sébastien Ogier

=== Power Stage ===
The "Power stage" was a live, televised 4.20 km (2.61 mi) stage at the end of the rally, held in Haguenau.

Pos	Driver	Time	Diff.	Avg. speed	Points
1	(Finland) Jari-Matti Latvala	3:09.4	0.0	79.83 km/h	3
2	(Spain) Dani Sordo	3:11.5	+2.1	78.96 km/h	2
3	(France) Sébastien Ogier	3:11.9	+2.5	78.79 km/h	1

== Standings after the race ==
Drivers' Championship standings

Pos	Driver	Points
1	(France) Sébastien Loeb	196
2	(Finland) Mikko Hirvonen	196
3	(France) Sébastien Ogier	193
4	(Finland) Jari-Matti Latvala	131
5	(Norway) Petter Solberg	110

Constructors' Championship standings

Pos	Constructor	Points
1	(France) Citroen Total World Rally Team	372
2	(United Kingdom) Ford Abu Dhabi World Rally Team	318
3	(United Kingdom) M-Sport Stobart Ford World Rally Team	133
4	(Norway) Petter Solberg World Rally Team	98
5	(Finland) Ice 1 Racing	48

- **Bold text** indicates World Champion.
- Note: Only the top five positions are included for both sets of standings.
