= 2011 World Rally Championship =

39th season of the FIA World Rally Championship

Champions
- World Drivers' Champion: Sébastien Loeb
- World Co-drivers' Champion: Daniel Elena
- World Manufacturers' Champion: Citroën

Seasons
- ← 2010 2012 →

The 2011 World Rally Championship was the 39th season of the FIA World Rally Championship. The season consisted of 13 rallies, beginning with Rally Sweden on 10 February and ended with Wales Rally GB on 13 November.

Sébastien Loeb claimed his eighth consecutive World Championship title at the Wales Rally of Great Britain when title rival Mikko Hirvonen retired on the first day with an engine that was too damaged to restart.

== Changes ==
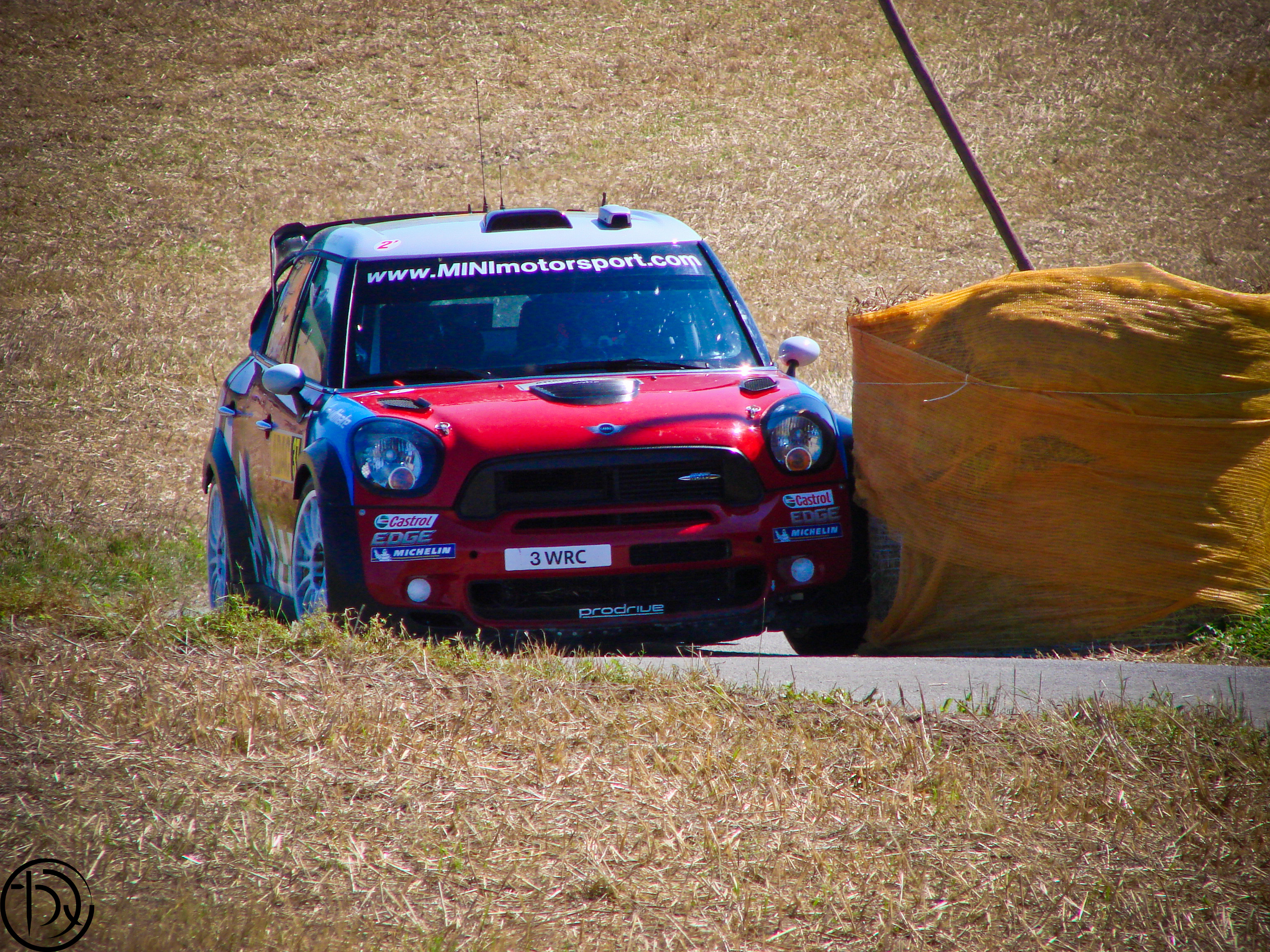
The Mini factory team returned to rallying with the John Cooper Works WRC.

- The new technical regulations for the World Rally Car became effective from 2011. The cars were based on the previous Super 2000 cars, fitted with a supplementary kit, which included turbo and rear-wing additions. The kit must be able to be fitted or removed within a defined time limit, to be determined. They will be powered by a 1600cc turbo engine instead of the previous 2000cc turbo unit.
- The sporting regulations were amended to allow any tyre manufacturer to supply tyres. Regulations were implemented to control costs. The amended regulations were presented to the WMSC for a fax vote before 20 July 2010.
- Michelin and British tyre firm DMACK became the two tyre suppliers for the season, following Pirelli's contract coming to an end and their announcement as the official tyre supplier for Formula One.
- Additional championship points will be awarded to the top three crews on a televised stage on the final day of each rally, known as the "Power Stage". 3 points will be awarded to the stage winner, with 2 and 1 for second and third respectively.

== Calendar ==
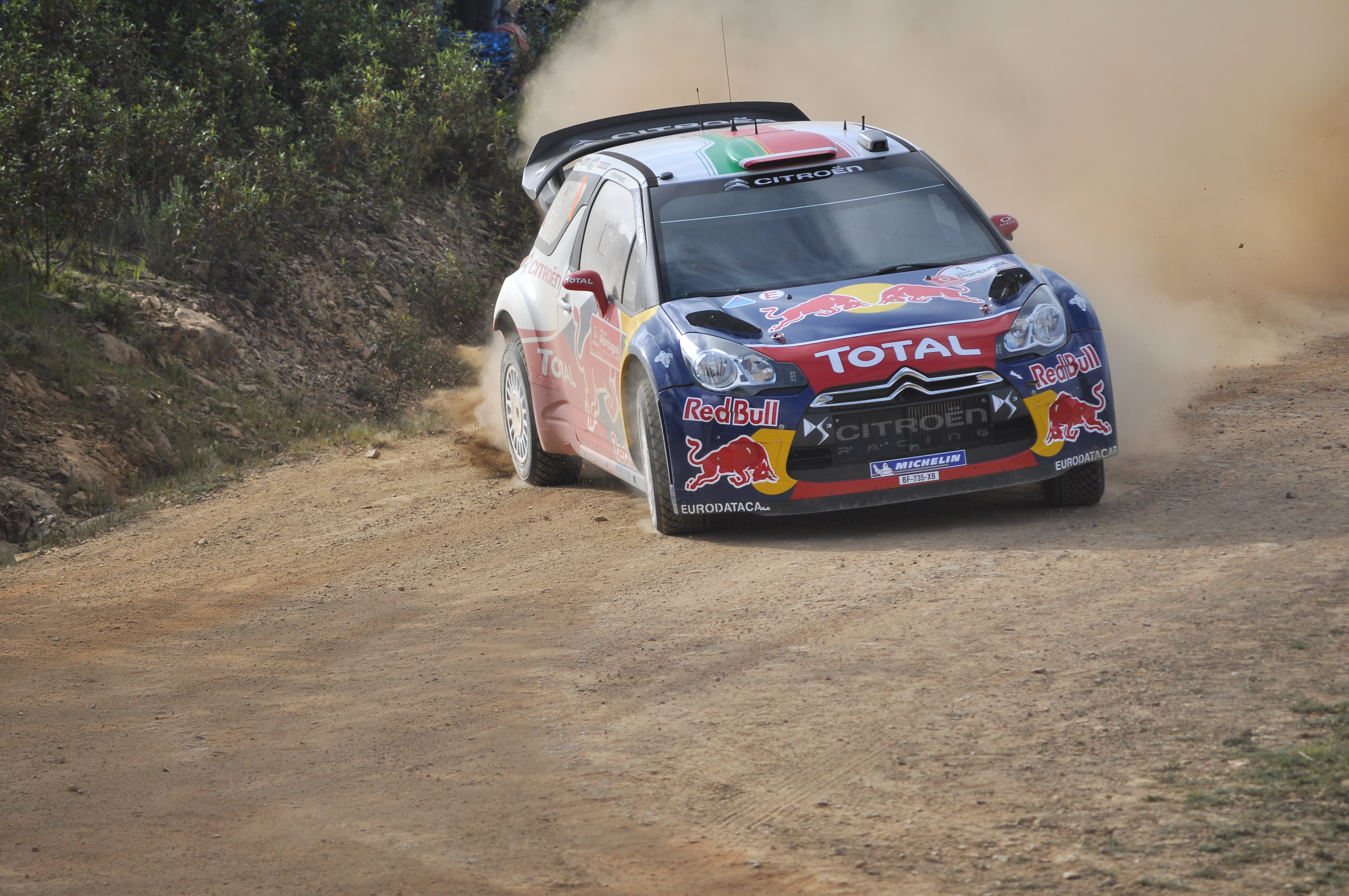
Defending champion Sébastien Loeb driving a Citroën DS3 WRC in Portugal.

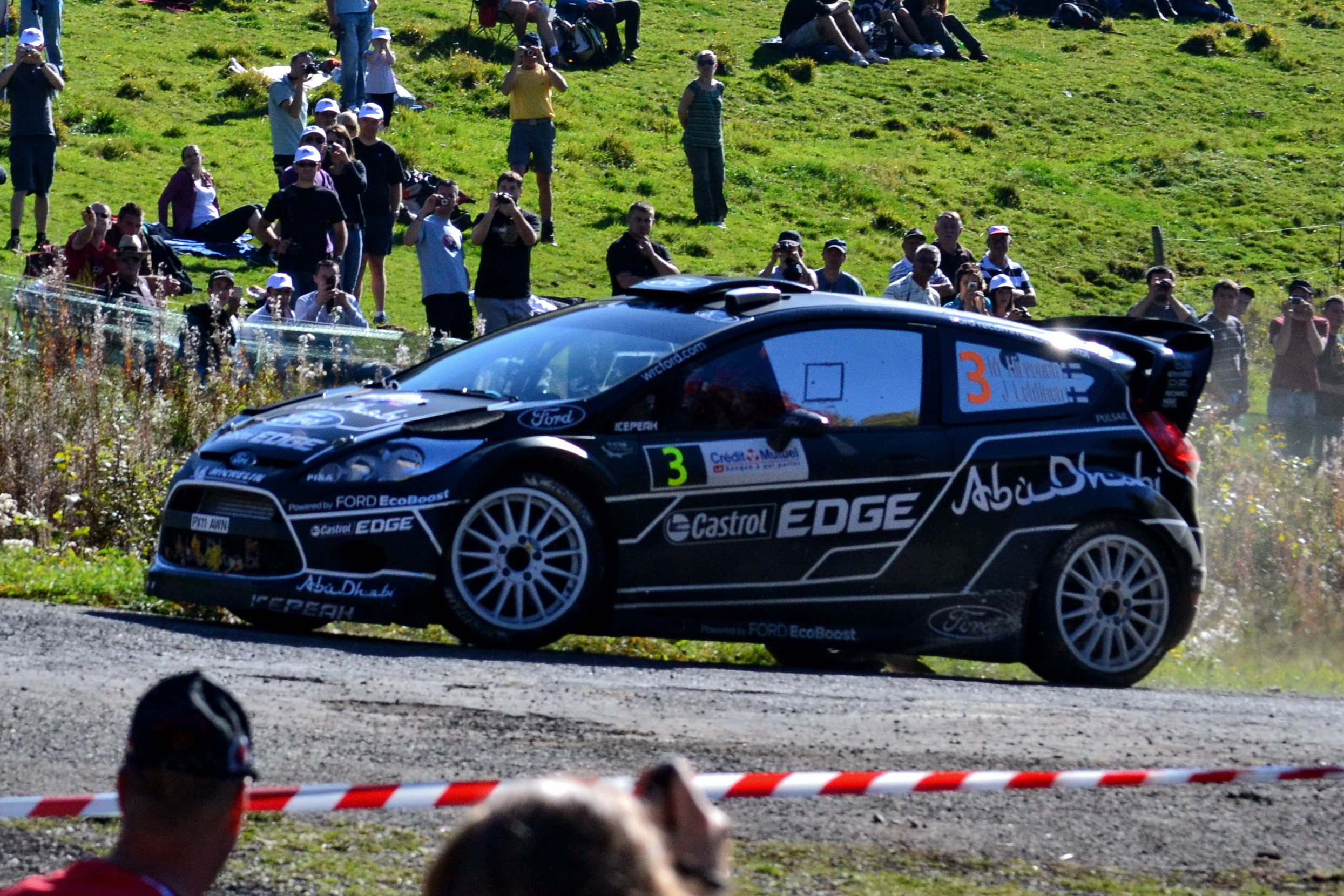
Mikko Hirvonen with a Ford Fiesta RS WRC at the Rallye de France.

The 2011 championship was contested over thirteen rounds in Europe, the Middle East, the Americas and Oceania. Following a fax vote by the members of the World Motor Sport Council (WMSC), the following calendar had been agreed for the 2011 FIA World Rally Championship.

| Rd. | Start date | Finish date | Rally | Rally headquarters | Surface | Stages | Distance | Support class |
|---|---|---|---|---|---|---|---|---|
| 1 | 10 February | 13 February | 59th Rally Sweden | Karlstad, Värmland County | Snow | 22 | 351.24 km | PWRC |
| 2 | 3 March | 6 March | 8th Rally Guanajuato Mexico | León, Guanajuato | Gravel | 22 | 365.34 km | SWRC |
| 3 | 24 March | 27 March | 45th Vodafone Rally de Portugal | Faro, Faro District | Gravel | 17 | 385.37 km | PWRC/WRC Academy |
| 4 | 14 April | 16 April | 3rd Jordan Rally WRC | Amman | Gravel | 20 | 333.04 km | SWRC |
| 5 | 6 May | 8 May | (Italy) 8th Rally d'Italia Sardinia | Olbia, Sardinia | Gravel | 18 | 339.70 km | SWRC/WRC Academy |
| 6 | 26 May | 29 May | 31st Rally Argentina | Carlos Paz, Córdoba | Gravel | 19 | 378.15 km | PWRC |
| 7 | 16 June | 19 June | (Greece) 57th Acropolis Rally | Loutraki, Corinthia | Gravel | 18 | 348.80 km | SWRC |
| 8 | 28 July | 31 July | 61st Neste Oil Rally Finland | Jyväskylä, Central Finland | Gravel | 22 | 314.39 km | PWRC/SWRC/WRC Academy |
| 9 | 18 August | 21 August | (Germany) 29th ADAC Rallye Deutschland | Trier, Rhineland-Palatinate | Tarmac | 19 | 359.59 km | SWRC/WRC Academy |
| 10 | 8 September | 11 September | 21st Repco Rally Australia | Coffs Harbour, New South Wales | Gravel | 26 | 368.96 km | PWRC |
| 11 | 29 September | 2 October | 2nd Rallye de France - Alsace | Strasbourg, Alsace | Tarmac | 23 | 337.43 km | SWRC/WRC Academy |
| 12 | 20 October | 23 October | (Spain) 47th RallyRACC Catalunya - Costa Daurada | Salou, Catalonia | Mixed | 18 | 406.52 km | PWRC/SWRC |
| 13 | 10 November | 13 November | (United Kingdom) 67th Wales Rally GB | Cardiff, Wales | Gravel | 23 | 353.53 km | PWRC/WRC Academy |

=== Calendar changes ===
- Rally di Sardegna and Rally Argentina returned to the WRC after one year in the Intercontinental Rally Challenge, replacing Rally Bulgaria and Rally Japan.
- Acropolis Rally replaced Rally of Turkey after a sabbatical year.
- Rally Australia replaced Rally New Zealand and relocated for the second time in five years. After moving from Perth in Western Australia to Kingscliff on the east coast after the 2006 event, the event ran out of Coffs Harbour, 250 kilometres (160 mi) to the south. The city has regularly hosted a round of the Australian Rally Championship for over a decade.

== Teams and drivers ==
Manufacturer teams
| Manufacturer | Car | Team | Tyre | No | Drivers | Co-drivers | Rounds |
|---|---|---|---|---|---|---|---|
| Citroën | DS3 WRC | (France) Citroën Total World Rally Team | M | 1 | (France) Sébastien Loeb | (Monaco) Daniel Elena | All |
| Citroën | DS3 WRC | (France) Citroën Total World Rally Team | M | 2 | (France) Sébastien Ogier | (France) Julien Ingrassia | All |
| Citroën | DS3 WRC | (Finland) ICE 1 Racing | M | 8 | (Finland) Kimi Räikkönen | (Finland) Kaj Lindström | 1, 3–4, 7–13 |
| Citroën | DS3 WRC | (Norway) Petter Solberg World Rally Team | M | 11 | (Norway) Petter Solberg | (United Kingdom) Chris Patterson | All |
| Citroën | DS3 WRC | (Netherlands) Van Merksteijn Motorsport | M | 14 | (Netherlands) Peter van Merksteijn Jr. | (Belgium) Eddy Chevaillier | 3–7 |
| Citroën | DS3 WRC | (Netherlands) Van Merksteijn Motorsport | M | 14 | (Netherlands) Peter van Merksteijn Jr. | (Belgium) Erwin Mombaerts | 9–13 |
| Citroën | DS3 WRC | (Netherlands) Van Merksteijn Motorsport | M | 20 | (Netherlands) Peter van Merksteijn Sr. | (Belgium) Erwin Mombaerts | 5, 7 |
| Ford | Fiesta RS WRC | (United Kingdom) Ford Abu Dhabi World Rally Team | M | 3 | (Finland) Mikko Hirvonen | (Finland) Jarmo Lehtinen | All |
| Ford | Fiesta RS WRC | (United Kingdom) Ford Abu Dhabi World Rally Team | M | 4 | (Finland) Jari-Matti Latvala | (Finland) Miikka Anttila | All |
| Ford | Fiesta RS WRC | (United Kingdom) M-Sport Stobart Ford World Rally Team | M | 5 | (Norway) Henning Solberg | (Austria) Ilka Minor | 1–4 |
| Ford | Fiesta RS WRC | (United Kingdom) M-Sport Stobart Ford World Rally Team | M | 5 | (United Kingdom) Matthew Wilson | (United Kingdom) Scott Martin | 5–13 |
| Ford | Fiesta RS WRC | (United Kingdom) M-Sport Stobart Ford World Rally Team | M | 6 | (Norway) Mads Østberg | (Sweden) Jonas Andersson | 1–9, 11–13 |
| Ford | Fiesta RS WRC | (United Kingdom) M-Sport Stobart Ford World Rally Team | M | 6 | (Russia) Evgenij Novikov | (France) Denis Giraudet | 10 |
| Ford | Fiesta RS WRC | (United Kingdom) M-Sport Stobart Ford World Rally Team | M | 15 | (United Kingdom) Matthew Wilson | (United Kingdom) Scott Martin | 1–4 |
| Ford | Fiesta RS WRC | (United Kingdom) M-Sport Stobart Ford World Rally Team | M | 15 | (Norway) Henning Solberg | (Austria) Ilka Minor | 5–13 |
| Ford | Fiesta RS WRC | (United Kingdom) M-Sport Stobart Ford World Rally Team | M | 16 | (Sweden) Per-Gunnar Andersson | (Sweden) Emil Axelsson | 5 |
| Ford | Fiesta RS WRC | (United Kingdom) M-Sport Stobart Ford World Rally Team | M | 16 | (Germany) Aaron Burkart | (Germany) Andre Kachel | 9 |
| Ford | Fiesta RS WRC | (United Kingdom) M-Sport Stobart Ford World Rally Team | D | 18 | (Estonia) Ott Tänak | (Estonia) Kuldar Sikk | 13 |
| Ford | Fiesta RS WRC | (United Kingdom) M-Sport Stobart Ford World Rally Team | M | 54 | (Russia) Evgenij Novikov | (Belgium) Stéphane Prévot | 2, 5 |
| Ford | Fiesta RS WRC | (United Kingdom) M-Sport Stobart Ford World Rally Team | M | 54 | (Russia) Evgenij Novikov | (France) Denis Giraudet | 7–8, 11 |
| Ford | Fiesta RS WRC | (Argentina) Munchi's Ford World Rally Team | M | 7 | (Argentina) Federico Villagra | (Argentina) Jorge Pérez Companc | 2–6 |
| Ford | Fiesta RS WRC | (Argentina) Munchi's Ford World Rally Team | M | 7 | (Argentina) Federico Villagra | (Argentina) José Díaz | 7 |
| Ford | Fiesta RS WRC | (Argentina) Munchi's Ford World Rally Team | M | 7 | (Argentina) Federico Villagra | (Argentina) Diego Curletto | 12 |
| Ford | Fiesta RS WRC | (United Arab Emirates) Team Abu Dhabi | M | 10 | (United Arab Emirates) Khalid Al Qassimi | (United Kingdom) Michael Orr | 1, 3–5, 8, 10–12 |
| Ford | Fiesta RS WRC | (United Arab Emirates) Team Abu Dhabi | M | 10 | (Russia) Evgeny Novikov | (France) Denis Giraudet | 13 |
| Ford | Fiesta RS WRC | (United States) Monster World Rally Team | M | 43 | (United States) Ken Block | (Italy) Alex Gelsomino | 1–3, 6, 9–13 |
| Ford | Fiesta RS WRC | (Netherlands) FERM Power Tools World Rally Team | M | 9 | (Netherlands) Dennis Kuipers | (Belgium) Frédéric Miclotte | 1–3, 5, 7–9, 11–13 |
| Ford | Fiesta RS WRC | (Netherlands) FERM Power Tools World Rally Team | M | 9 | (Netherlands) Dennis Kuipers | (Belgium) Bjorn Degandt | 4 |
| Ford | Fiesta RS WRC | (Netherlands) FERM Power Tools World Rally Team | M | 18 | (Netherlands) René Kuipers | (Belgium) Robin Buysmans | 9 |
| Ford | Fiesta RS WRC | (Netherlands) FERM Power Tools World Rally Team | M | 18 | (Netherlands) René Kuipers | (Netherlands) Annemieke Hulzebos | 7–8 |
| Mini | John Cooper Works WRC | (United Kingdom) Mini WRC Team | M | 37 | (Spain) Dani Sordo | (Spain) Carlos del Barrio | 5, 8–9, 11–13 |
| Mini | John Cooper Works WRC | (United Kingdom) Mini WRC Team | M | 52 | (United Kingdom) Kris Meeke | (Republic of Ireland) Paul Nagle | 5, 8–9, 11–13 |
| Mini | John Cooper Works WRC | Brazil World Rally Team | M | 12 | (Brazil) Daniel Oliveira | (Argentina) Fernando Mussano | 13 |
| Mini | John Cooper Works WRC | Brazil World Rally Team | M | 12 | (Brazil) Daniel Oliveira | (Portugal) Carlos Magalhães | 5–12 |

World Rally Car entries ineligible to score manufacturer points
| Manufacturer | Car | Team | Tyre | Drivers | Co-drivers | Rounds |
|---|---|---|---|---|---|---|
| Citroën | DS3 WRC | (France) Citroën Racing Technilogies | M | (Russia) Evgenij Novikov | (France) Denis Giraudet | 12 |
| Ford | Fiesta RS WRC | (United Kingdom) M-Sport | M | (Sweden) Per-Gunnar Andersson | (Sweden) Emil Axelsson | 1 |
| Ford | Fiesta RS WRC | (Portugal) Team Quinta do Lorde | M | (Portugal) Bernardo Sousa | (Portugal) António Costa | 3 |
| Ford | Fiesta RS WRC | Team Greece | M | (Greece) Lambros Athanassoulas | (Greece) Nikolaos Zakheos | 7 |
| Ford | Fiesta RS WRC | (Finland) HJ-Autotalo.com | M | (Finland) Jari Ketomaa | (Finland) Mika Stenberg | 8 |
| Ford | Fiesta RS WRC | (Czech Republic) Czech Ford National Team | M | (Czech Republic) Martin Prokop | (Czech Republic) Jan Tománek | 13 |
| Mini | John Cooper Works WRC | (Italy) Motorsport Italia/BAMP | M | (Portugal) Armindo Araújo | (Portugal) Miguel Ramalho | 5, 7–9, 11–13 |
| Mini | John Cooper Works WRC | (Italy) Grifone | M | (Sweden) Patrik Flodin | (Sweden) Goran Bergsten | 5, 9 |
| Mini | John Cooper Works WRC | (Italy) Grifone | M | (Finland) Matti Rantanen | (Finland) Mikko Lukka | 8 |
| Mini | John Cooper Works WRC | (United Kingdom) Prodrive | M | (Finland) Mattias Therman | (Finland) Janne Perälä | 8 |
| Mini | John Cooper Works WRC | Equipe de France FFSA | M | (France) Pierre Campana | (France) Sabrina De Castelli | 9, 11 |
| Mini | John Cooper Works WRC | (Brazil) Palmerinha Rally | M | (Brazil) Paulo Nobre | (Brazil) Edu Paula | 13 |

=== Driver changes ===
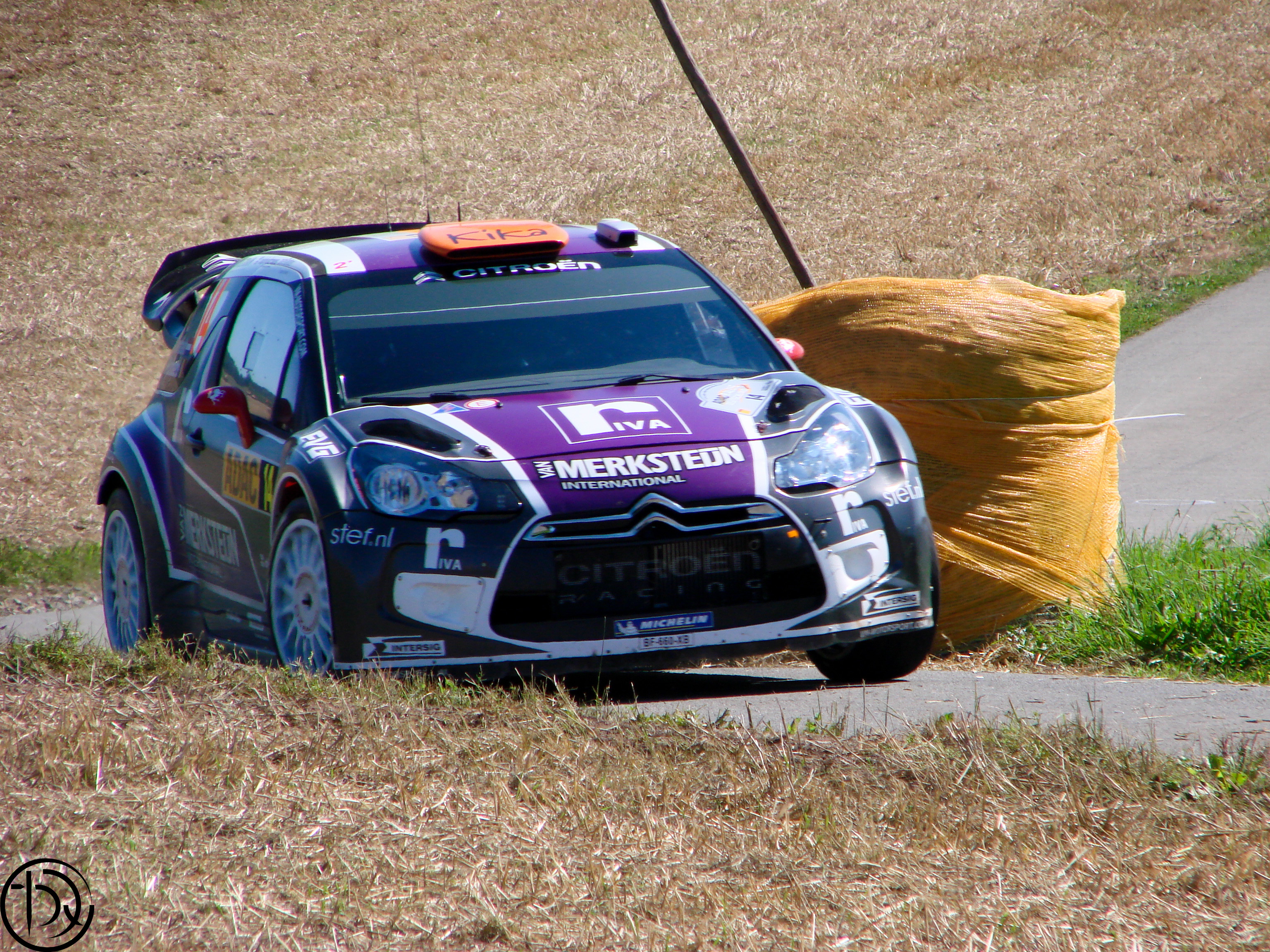
Peter van Merksteijn Jr. driving at the Rallye Deutschland.

- After being promoted to the Citroën works team for the 2010 Rally Finland in place of Dani Sordo, Sébastien Ogier signed a contract to drive for the team for the entire 2011 season, despite an offer from Ford.
- 2009 Intercontinental Rally Challenge champion Kris Meeke will move to the World Rally Championship, joining debutants Mini in their Prodrive-run John Cooper Works WRC. He will be joined by Dani Sordo after the Spaniard lost his place at Citroën.
- Peter van Merksteijn Jr. will compete for Van Merksteijn Motorsport with a Citroën DS3 WRC in 10 selected events, while his father Peter van Merksteijn Sr. will drive in 3.
- Daniel Oliveira who previously competed in the Intercontinental Rally Challenge will compete with a MINI John Cooper Works WRC in selected events for the Brazil World Rally Team.
- Dennis Kuipers, who raced in 2010 with a Ford Fiesta S2000 run by M-Sport, will compete for the FERM Power Tools World Rally Team.

=== Team changes ===
- Mini returned to the World Rally Championship as a factory team for the first time since 1967. The manufacturer used the Mini John Cooper Works, to be run by Dave Richards' Prodrive team after Prodrive failed in their bid to join the 2010 and 2011 Formula One grids. The John Cooper Works WRC will be run in a limited campaign of selected events for the 2011 season, with a view to taking part in the full World Championship from 2012.

=== SWRC entries ===
| No | Team | Driver | Co-driver | Car | Rounds |
|---|---|---|---|---|---|
| 21 | (Czech Republic) Czech Ford National Team | (Czech Republic) Martin Prokop | (Czech Republic) Jan Tománek | Ford Fiesta S2000 | 2, 5, 7–9, 11–12 |
| 22 | (Estonia) MM Motorsport | (Estonia) Ott Tänak | (Estonia) Kuldar Sikk | Ford Fiesta S2000 | 2, 5, 7–9, 11–12 |
| 23 | (Qatar) Barwa World Rally Team | (Qatar) Nasser Al-Attiyah | (Italy) Giovanni Bernacchini | Ford Fiesta S2000 | 2, 4–5, 7, 9, 11–12 |
| 24 | (Portugal) Team Quinta do Lorde | (Portugal) Bernardo Sousa | (Portugal) António Costa | Ford Fiesta S2000 | 4–5, 7 |
| 24 | (Portugal) Team Quinta do Lorde | (Portugal) Bernardo Sousa | (Portugal) Paulo Babo | Ford Fiesta S2000 | 8–9, 11–12 |
| 25 | (Austria) Red Bull Škoda | (Finland) Juho Hänninen | (Finland) Mikko Markkula | Škoda Fabia S2000 | 2, 5, 7–9, 11–12 |
| 27 | (Austria) Red Bull Škoda | (Germany) Hermann Gassner, Jr. | (Germany) Katharina Wüstenhagen | Škoda Fabia S2000 | 4–5, 7–9, 11–12 |
| 26 | (Estonia) ME3 Rally Team | (Estonia) Karl Kruuda | (Estonia) Martin Järveoja | Škoda Fabia S2000 | 2, 4–5, 7–9, 12 |
| 28 | (Norway) PS Engineering | (Norway) Eyvind Brynildsen | (Norway) Cato Menkerud | Škoda Fabia S2000 | 4–5, 7–9, 11 |
| 28 | (Norway) PS Engineering | (Republic of Ireland) Craig Breen | (United Kingdom) Gareth Roberts | Ford Fiesta S2000 | 12 |
| 29 | (Hungary) Turán Motorsport | (Hungary) Frigyes Turán | (Hungary) Gábor Zsíros | Ford Fiesta S2000 | 4–5, 7–9, 11–12 |
| 30 | (Spain) PCR Sport | (Andorra) Albert Llovera | (Spain) Diego Vallejo | Fiat Abarth Grande Punto S2000 | 4–5, 7–9, 11–12 |
| 32 | (Italy) Motorsport Italia/BAMP | (Portugal) Armindo Araújo | (Portugal) Miguel Ramalho | Mini John Cooper Works S2000 | 3 |
| 37 | (Germany) Volkswagen Motorsport | (Finland) Joonas Lindroos | (Finland) Pasi Kipeläinen | Škoda Fabia S2000 | 8 |
| 37 | (Germany) Volkswagen Motorsport | (Norway) Andreas Mikkelsen | (Norway) Ola Floene | Škoda Fabia S2000 | 8 |
| 37 | (Germany) Volkswagen Motorsport | (Germany) Christian Riedemann | (Germany) Michael Wenzel | Škoda Fabia S2000 | 9, 12 |
| 37 | (Germany) Volkswagen Motorsport | (Netherlands) Hans Weijs, Jr. | (Belgium) Bjorn Degandt | Škoda Fabia S2000 | 9 |
| 37 | (Germany) Volkswagen Motorsport | (Spain) Yeray Lemes | (Spain) Rogelio Peñate | Škoda Fabia S2000 | 12 |
| 37 | (Germany) Volkswagen Motorsport | (Netherlands) Kevin Abbring | (Belgium) Lara Vanneste | Škoda Fabia S2000 | 13 |
| 37 | (Germany) Volkswagen Motorsport | (Germany) Sepp Wiegand | (Germany) Timo Gottschalk | Škoda Fabia S2000 | 13 |
| 39 | (Netherlands) FERM Power Tools World Rally Team | (Netherlands) René Kuipers | (Netherlands) Annemieke Hulzebos | Ford Fiesta S2000 | 1, 5 |
| 42 | Brazil World Rally Team | (Brazil) Daniel Oliveira | (Portugal) Carlos Magalhães | Mini John Cooper Works S2000 | 3–4 |
Additional guest entries^{†}
| 49 | (Jordan) Ammar Hijazi Rally Team | (Jordan) Ammar Hijazi | (Lebanon) Joseph Matar | Škoda Fabia S2000 | 4 |
| 49 | Mitsubishi Ralliart Finland | (Finland) Juha Salo | (Finland) Marko Salminen | Mitsubishi Lancer Evo X R4 | 8 |
| 50 | (Germany) Robot Racing | (Germany) Felix Herbold | (Germany) Michael Kölbach | Ford Fiesta S2000 | 9 |
| 49 | (France) Team Emap Yacco | (France) Julien Maurin | (France) Olivier Ural | Ford Fiesta S2000 | 11 |

=== PWRC entries ===
| No | Team | Driver | Co-driver | Car | Rounds |
|---|---|---|---|---|---|
| 21 | (Russia) Uspenskiy Rally Tecnica | (Sweden) Patrik Flodin | (Sweden) Göran Bergsten | Subaru Impreza WRX STI | 1, 3, 8, 12 |
| 21 | (Russia) Uspenskiy Rally Tecnica | (Sweden) Patrik Flodin | (Sweden) Maria Andersson | Subaru Impreza WRX STI | 6 |
| 21 | (Russia) Uspenskiy Rally Tecnica | (Sweden) Patrik Flodin | (Finland) Timo Alanne | Subaru Impreza WRX STI | 13 |
| 33 | (Russia) Uspenskiy Rally Tecnica | (Russia) Dmitry Tagirov | (Russia) Anna Zavershinskaya | Subaru Impreza WRX STI | 1, 3, 6, 8, 12–13 |
| 22 | (Poland) Lotos Dynamic Rally Team | (Poland) Michał Kościuszko | (Poland) Maciek Szczepaniak | Mitsubishi Lancer Evo X | 3, 6, 8, 10, 12–13 |
| 23 | (Italy) G.B Motors | (Italy) Gianluca Linari | (Italy) Paolo Gregoriani | Subaru Impreza WRX STI | 1 |
| 23 | (Italy) G.B Motors | (Italy) Gianluca Linari | (Italy) Nicola Arena | Subaru Impreza WRX STI | 3, 6, 10, 13 |
| 23 | (Italy) G.B Motors | (Italy) Gianluca Linari | (Italy) Chiara Bioletti | Subaru Impreza WRX STI | 12 |
| 24 | (Norway) Bilbutikken AS World Rally Team | (Norway) Anders Grøndal | (Norway) Veronica Engan | Subaru Impreza WRX STI | 1, 3 |
| 24 | (Norway) Bilbutikken AS World Rally Team | (Australia) Brendan Reeves | (Australia) Rhianon Smyth | Subaru Impreza WRX STI | 10 |
| 24 | (Norway) Bilbutikken AS World Rally Team | (Finland) Jarkko Nikara | (Finland) Petri Nikara | Mitsubishi Lancer Evo IX | 8, 13 |
| 24 | (Norway) Bilbutikken AS World Rally Team | (Spain) Carles Llinas | (Spain) Juan Torra | Mitsubishi Lancer Evo IX | 12 |
| 25 | (Finland) Jukka Ketomäki Rally Team | (Finland) Jukka Ketomäki | (Finland) Kai Risberg | Mitsubishi Lancer Evo X | 1, 3, 8, 12–13 |
| 25 | (Finland) Jukka Ketomäki Rally Team | (Finland) Jukka Ketomäki | (Finland) Kai Risberg | Mitsubishi Lancer Evo IX | 10 |
| 26 | (Czech Republic) Semerád Rally Team | (Czech Republic) Martin Semerád | (Czech Republic) Michal Ernst | Mitsubishi Lancer Evo IX | 1, 3, 6, 8, 12–13 |
| 27 | (United Kingdom) Harry Hunt Motorsport | (United Kingdom) Harry Hunt | (United Kingdom) Sebastian Marchall | Citroën DS3 R3T | 3 |
| 27 | (United Kingdom) Harry Hunt Motorsport | (United Kingdom) Harry Hunt | (United Kingdom) Robbie Durant | Citroën DS3 R3T | 6, 8, 10, 12–13 |
| 28 | (United Arab Emirates) Team Abu Dhabi | (United Arab Emirates) Majed Al Shamsi | (United Arab Emirates) Khaled Al Kendi | Subaru Impreza WRX STI | 1 |
| 28 | (United Arab Emirates) Team Abu Dhabi | (United Arab Emirates) Majed Al Shamsi | (Republic of Ireland) Killian Duffy | Subaru Impreza WRX STI | 3, 8, 10, 12–13 |
| 29 | (United Arab Emirates) Team Abu Dhabi | (United Arab Emirates) Bader Al Jabri | (Republic of Ireland) Stephen McAuley | Subaru Impreza WRX STI | 1, 3, 8, 10, 12–13 |
| 30 | (Ukraine) Mentos Ascania Racing | (Ukraine) Oleksandr Saliuk, Jr. | (Ukraine) Pavlo Cherepin | Mitsubishi Lancer Evo IX | 1, 3, 8, 10, 12–13 |
| 31 | (Ukraine) Mentos Ascania Racing | (Ukraine) Oleksiy Kikireshko | (Ukraine) Vadym Cherneha | Mitsubishi Lancer Evo IX | 1, 3 |
| 31 | (Ukraine) Mentos Ascania Racing | (Ukraine) Oleksiy Kikireshko | (Estonia) Sergei Larens | Mitsubishi Lancer Evo IX | 8, 10, 12–13 |
| 32 | (Ukraine) Mentos Ascania Racing | (Ukraine) Valeriy Gorban | (Ukraine) Yevheniy Leonov | Mitsubishi Lancer Evo IX | 1 |
| 32 | (Ukraine) Mentos Ascania Racing | (Ukraine) Valeriy Gorban | (Estonia) Sergei Larens | Mitsubishi Lancer Evo IX | 3 |
| 32 | (Ukraine) Mentos Ascania Racing | (Ukraine) Valeriy Gorban | (Ukraine) Vadym Cherneha | Mitsubishi Lancer Evo IX | 8 |
| 32 | (Ukraine) Mentos Ascania Racing | (Ukraine) Valeriy Gorban | (Ukraine) Andriy Nikolaiev | Mitsubishi Lancer Evo IX | 10, 12–13 |
| 34 | (Ukraine) Darnytsa Motorsport | (Ukraine) Yuriy Protasov | (Ukraine) Adrian Aftanaziv | Mitsubishi Lancer Evo X | 1, 3, 6, 8 |
| 35 | Ralliart Italy | (Peru) Nicolàs Fuchs | (Argentina) Rubén García | Mitsubishi Lancer Evo X | 1, 3, 6, 8, 12–13 |
| 37 | Ralliart Italy | (Mexico) Ricardo Triviño | (Spain) Sergio Salom | Mitsubishi Lancer Evo X | 1 |
| 39 | Ralliart Italy | (Mexico) Benito Guerra | (Spain) Borja Rozada | Mitsubishi Lancer Evo X | 10 |
| 36 | (Palestine) Easycar Rally Team | (Palestine) Rami Jaber | (United Kingdom) Nicola Fearnley | Mitsubishi Lancer Evo IX | 3 |
| 38 | New Zealand World Rally Team | (New Zealand) Hayden Paddon | (New Zealand) John Kennard | Subaru Impreza WRX STI | 3, 6, 8, 10, 12 |
| 39 | (Italy) GMA Racing | (Mexico) Benito Guerra | (Spain) Borja Rozada | Mitsubishi Lancer Evo X | 3, 6, 8 |
| 39 | (Spain) RMC Motorsport | (Mexico) Benito Guerra | (Spain) Borja Rozada | Mitsubishi Lancer Evo X | 12–13 |
Additional guest entries^{†}
| 49 | (Portugal) Team Além Mar | (Portugal) Ricardo Moura | (Portugal) Luis Ramalho | Mitsubishi Lancer Evo IX | 3 |
| 49 | (Argentina) VRS Rally Team | (Argentina) Alejandro Levy | (Argentina) Diego Levy | Mitsubishi Lancer Evo IX | 6 |
| 50 | (Argentina) Schroeder Competicion | (Argentina) Ezequiel Campos | (Argentina) Christian Winkler | Mitsubishi Lancer Evo IX | 6 |
| 149 | (Finland) ST Motors | (Finland) Riku Tahko | (Finland) Markus Soininen | Mitsubishi Lancer Evo X | 8 |
| 150 | (United Kingdom) Autosport Technology | (Finland) Mikko Pajunen | (Finland) Jani Salo | Renault Clio R3 | 8 |
| 49 | (Australia) Coffs Coast Rally Team | (Australia) Nathan Quinn | (Australia) David Green | Mitsubishi Lancer Evo IX | 10 |
| 50 | (Australia) Gotech Rally Team | (Australia) Leigh Gotch | (Australia) Rodger Pederson | Subaru Impreza WRX STI | 10 |
| 50 | (United Kingdom) North Road Garage | (United Kingdom) Jason Pritchard | (United Kingdom) Dale Furniss | Subaru Impreza WRX STI | 13 |

=== WRC Academy entries ===
The WRC Academy used identical Ford Fiesta R2s.

| No | Driver | Co-driver | Rounds |
|---|---|---|---|
| 100 | (Sweden) Calle Ward | (Norway) Morten Erik Abrahamsen | 3, 5 |
| 101 | (United Kingdom) Alastair Fisher | (United Kingdom) Daniel Barritt | 3, 5, 8–9, 11, 13 |
| 102 | (Spain) José Suárez | (Spain) Cándido Carrera | 3, 5, 8–9, 11, 13 |
| 103 | (Italy) Andrea Crugnola | (Italy) Roberto Mometti | 3 |
| 103 | (Italy) Andrea Crugnola | (Italy) Michele Ferrana | 5, 8–9, 11, 13 |
| 104 | (Czech Republic) Jan Černý | (Czech Republic) Pavel Kohout | 3, 5, 8–9, 11, 13 |
| 105 | (Estonia) Miko-Ove Niinemäe | (Estonia) Timo Kasesalu | 3, 5, 8–9 |
| 105 | (Estonia) Miko-Ove Niinemäe | (Estonia) Mait Laidvee | 11 |
| 105 | (Estonia) Miko-Ove Niinemäe | (Estonia) Toomas Valter | 13 |
| 106 | (Australia) Brendan Reeves | (Australia) Rhianon Smyth | 3, 5, 8–9, 11, 13 |
| 107 | (France) Sebastien Chadonnet | (France) Thidault de la Haye | 3 |
| 108 | (Estonia) Egon Kaur | (Estonia) Mait Laidvee | 3, 8 |
| 108 | (Estonia) Egon Kaur | (Estonia) Erik Lepikson | 5, 9, 11, 13 |
| 109 | (Republic of Ireland) Craig Breen | (United Kingdom) Gareth Roberts | 3, 5, 8–9, 11, 13 |
| 110 | (Spain) Yeray Lemes | (Spain) Rogelio Peñate | 3, 5, 8–9, 11, 13 |
| 111 | (Sweden) Victor Henriksson | (Sweden) Joel Ardell | 3, 5, 8–9 |
| 112 | (Russia) Sergey Karyakin | (Russia) Natalya Potapova | 3 |
| 112 | (Russia) Sergey Karyakin | (Russia) Demitri Balin | 5 |
| 112 | (Russia) Sergey Karyakin | (Russia) Anton Vlasyak | 8–9, 11, 13 |
| 113 | (Argentina) Miguel Baldoni | (Argentina) Fernando Mussano | 3, 5, 8 |
| 113 | (Argentina) Miguel Baldoni | (Argentina) Guatavo Franchello | 9 |
| 114 | (Sweden) Fredrik Åhlin | (Sweden) Håkan Jacobsson | 3 |
| 114 | (Sweden) Fredrik Åhlin | (Sweden) Björn Nilsson | 5, 8 |
| 114 | (Sweden) Fredrik Åhlin | (Norway) Morten Erik Abrahamsen | 9 |
| 114 | (Sweden) Fredrik Åhlin | (Sweden) Stephan Ottosson | 11, 13 |
| 115 | (Australia) Molly Taylor | (Australia) Rebecca Smart | 3, 5 |
| 115 | (Australia) Molly Taylor | (United Kingdom) Sebastian Marshall | 8–9, 11, 13 |
| 116 | (Germany) Christian Riedemann | (Germany) Michael Wenzel | 3, 5, 8, 11, 13 |
| 117 | (Germany) Philipp Knof | (Germany) Henry Wichura | 3 |
| 118 | (Netherlands) Timo van den Marel | (Netherlands) Erwin Berkhof | 3, 5, 8–9, 11, 13 |
| 119 | (Italy) Matteo Brunello | (Italy) Michele Ferrara | 3 |
| 119 | (Italy) Matteo Brunello | (Italy) Carlo Pisano | 5 |
| 120 | (Germany) Sepp Wiegand | (Germany) Claudia Harloff | 9, 11 |
| 121 | (South Africa) Ashley Haigh-Smith | (United Kingdom) James Aldridge | 11, 13 |
| 122 | (Germany) Valentin Hummel | (Germany) Katja Geyer | 13 |
| 123 | (United States) Christopher Duplessis | (Republic of Ireland) Karl Atkinson | 13 |

== Results and standings ==
=== Results and statistics ===
| Colour | Rally Surface |
|---|---|
| Gold | Gravel |
| Silver | Tarmac |
| Blue | Snow/Ice |
| Bronze | Mixed Surface |

| Round | Rally name | Podium finishers | | | | Statistics | | | |
| Round | Rally name | Rank | Driver | Car | Time | Stages | Length | Starters | Finishers |
|---|---|---|---|---|---|---|---|---|---|
| 1 | (Sweden) Swedish Rally (10–13 February) — Results and report | 1 | (Finland) Mikko Hirvonen | Ford Fiesta RS WRC | 3:23:56.6 | 22 | 351.00 km | 44 | 34 |
| 1 | (Sweden) Swedish Rally (10–13 February) — Results and report | 2 | (Norway) Mads Østberg | Ford Fiesta RS WRC | 3:24:03.1 | 22 | 351.00 km | 44 | 34 |
| 1 | (Sweden) Swedish Rally (10–13 February) — Results and report | 3 | (Finland) Jari-Matti Latvala | Ford Fiesta RS WRC | 3:24:30.6 | 22 | 351.00 km | 44 | 34 |
| 2 | Rally Mexico (3–6 March) — Results and report | 1 | (France) Sébastien Loeb | Citroën DS3 WRC | 3:53:17.0 | 22 | 364.87 km | 24 | 18 |
| 2 | Rally Mexico (3–6 March) — Results and report | 2 | (Finland) Mikko Hirvonen | Ford Fiesta RS WRC | 3:54:55.4 | 22 | 364.87 km | 24 | 18 |
| 2 | Rally Mexico (3–6 March) — Results and report | 3 | (Finland) Jari-Matti Latvala | Ford Fiesta RS WRC | 3:55:40.9 | 22 | 364.87 km | 24 | 18 |
| 3 | Rally de Portugal (24–27 March) — Results and report | 1 | (France) Sébastien Ogier | Citroën DS3 WRC | 4:10:53.4 | 17 | 385.37 km | 70 | 38 |
| 3 | Rally de Portugal (24–27 March) — Results and report | 2 | (France) Sébastien Loeb | Citroën DS3 WRC | 4:11:25.2 | 17 | 385.37 km | 70 | 38 |
| 3 | Rally de Portugal (24–27 March) — Results and report | 3 | (Finland) Jari-Matti Latvala | Ford Fiesta RS WRC | 4:14:15.5 | 17 | 385.37 km | 70 | 38 |
| 4 | Jordan Rally (14–16 April) — Results and report | 1 | (France) Sébastien Ogier | Citroën DS3 WRC | 2:48:28.2 | 20 | 333.04 km | 28 | 23 |
| 4 | Jordan Rally (14–16 April) — Results and report | 2 | (Finland) Jari-Matti Latvala | Ford Fiesta RS WRC | 2:48:28.4 | 20 | 333.04 km | 28 | 23 |
| 4 | Jordan Rally (14–16 April) — Results and report | 3 | (France) Sébastien Loeb | Citroën DS3 WRC | 2:48:55.9 | 20 | 333.04 km | 28 | 23 |
| 5 | (Italy) Rally Italia Sardegna (5–8 May) — Results and report | 1 | (France) Sébastien Loeb | Citroën DS3 WRC | 3:45:40.9 | 18 | 339.70 km | 64 | 32 |
| 5 | (Italy) Rally Italia Sardegna (5–8 May) — Results and report | 2 | (Finland) Mikko Hirvonen | Ford Fiesta RS WRC | 3:45:52.1 | 18 | 339.70 km | 64 | 32 |
| 5 | (Italy) Rally Italia Sardegna (5–8 May) — Results and report | 3 | (Norway) Petter Solberg | Citroën DS3 WRC | 3:46:04.7 | 18 | 339.70 km | 64 | 32 |
| 6 | Rally Argentina (26–29 May) — Results and report | 1 | (France) Sébastien Loeb | Citroën DS3 WRC | 4:03:56.9 | 19 | 378.15 km | 33 | 27 |
| 6 | Rally Argentina (26–29 May) — Results and report | 2 | (Finland) Mikko Hirvonen | Ford Fiesta RS WRC | 4:03:59.3 | 19 | 378.15 km | 33 | 27 |
| 6 | Rally Argentina (26–29 May) — Results and report | 3 | (France) Sébastien Ogier | Citroën DS3 WRC | 4:04:04.2 | 19 | 378.15 km | 33 | 27 |
| 7 | (Greece) Acropolis Rally (16–19 June) — Results and report | 1 | (France) Sébastien Ogier | Citroën DS3 WRC | 4:04:44.3 | 18 | 348.80 km | 42 | 35 |
| 7 | (Greece) Acropolis Rally (16–19 June) — Results and report | 2 | (France) Sébastien Loeb | Citroën DS3 WRC | 4:04:54.8 | 18 | 348.80 km | 42 | 35 |
| 7 | (Greece) Acropolis Rally (16–19 June) — Results and report | 3 | (Finland) Mikko Hirvonen | Ford Fiesta RS WRC | 4:04:57.8 | 18 | 348.80 km | 42 | 35 |
| 8 | Rally Finland (28–30 July) — Results and report | 1 | (France) Sébastien Loeb | Citroën DS3 WRC | 2:39:37.0 | 22 | 314.39 km | 125 | 66 |
| 8 | Rally Finland (28–30 July) — Results and report | 2 | (Finland) Jari-Matti Latvala | Ford Fiesta RS WRC | 2:39:45.1 | 22 | 314.39 km | 125 | 66 |
| 8 | Rally Finland (28–30 July) — Results and report | 3 | (France) Sébastien Ogier | Citroën DS3 WRC | 2:39:49.8 | 22 | 314.39 km | 125 | 66 |
| 9 | (Germany) Rallye Deutschland (18–21 August) — Results and report | 1 | (France) Sébastien Ogier | Citroën DS3 WRC | 3:32:15.9 | 19 | 359.59 km | 85 | 48 |
| 9 | (Germany) Rallye Deutschland (18–21 August) — Results and report | 2 | (France) Sébastien Loeb | Citroën DS3 WRC | 3:32:55.7 | 19 | 359.59 km | 85 | 48 |
| 9 | (Germany) Rallye Deutschland (18–21 August) — Results and report | 3 | (Spain) Dani Sordo | Mini John Cooper Works WRC | 3:34:11.5 | 19 | 359.59 km | 85 | 48 |
| 10 | Rally Australia (8–11 September) — Results and report | 1 | (Finland) Mikko Hirvonen | Ford Fiesta RS WRC | 3:35:59.0 | 26 | 368.96 km | 30 | 21 |
| 10 | Rally Australia (8–11 September) — Results and report | 2 | (Finland) Jari-Matti Latvala | Ford Fiesta RS WRC | 3:36:13.7 | 26 | 368.96 km | 30 | 21 |
| 10 | Rally Australia (8–11 September) — Results and report | 3 | (Norway) Petter Solberg | Citroën DS3 WRC | 3:36:43.8 | 26 | 368.96 km | 30 | 21 |
| 11 | Rallye de France–Alsace (30 September – 2 October) — Results and report | 1 | (France) Sébastien Ogier | Citroën DS3 WRC | 3:06:20.4 | 23 | 348.13 km | 84 | 54 |
| 11 | Rallye de France–Alsace (30 September – 2 October) — Results and report | 2 | (Spain) Dani Sordo | Mini John Cooper Works WRC | 3:06:26.7 | 23 | 348.13 km | 84 | 54 |
| 11 | Rallye de France–Alsace (30 September – 2 October) — Results and report | 3 | (Finland) Mikko Hirvonen | Ford Fiesta RS WRC | 3:09:47.0 | 23 | 348.13 km | 84 | 54 |
| 12 | (Spain) Rally Catalunya (20–23 October) — Results and report | 1 | (France) Sébastien Loeb | Citroën DS3 WRC | 4:05:39.3 | 18 | 406.06 km | 58 | 44 |
| 12 | (Spain) Rally Catalunya (20–23 October) — Results and report | 2 | (Finland) Mikko Hirvonen | Ford Fiesta RS WRC | 4:07:46.2 | 18 | 406.06 km | 58 | 44 |
| 12 | (Spain) Rally Catalunya (20–23 October) — Results and report | 3 | (Finland) Jari-Matti Latvala | Ford Fiesta RS WRC | 4:08:11.7 | 18 | 406.06 km | 58 | 44 |
| 13 | (United Kingdom) Wales Rally GB (10–13 November) — Results and report | 1 | (Finland) Jari-Matti Latvala | Ford Fiesta RS WRC | 3:27:03.5 | 23 | 358.59 km | 78 | 41 |
| 13 | (United Kingdom) Wales Rally GB (10–13 November) — Results and report | 2 | (Norway) Mads Østberg | Ford Fiesta RS WRC | 3:30:46.4 | 23 | 358.59 km | 78 | 41 |
| 13 | (United Kingdom) Wales Rally GB (10–13 November) — Results and report | 3 | (Norway) Henning Solberg | Ford Fiesta RS WRC | 3:34:08.6 | 23 | 358.59 km | 78 | 41 |

=== Standings ===
==== Drivers' championship ====
Points are awarded to the top 10 classified finishers.

| Position | 1st | 2nd | 3rd | 4th | 5th | 6th | 7th | 8th | 9th | 10th |
| Points | 25 | 18 | 15 | 12 | 10 | 8 | 6 | 4 | 2 | 1 |

| Pos. | Driver | SWE (Sweden) | MEX (Mexico) | POR (Portugal) | JOR (Jordan) | ITA (Italy) | ARG (Argentina) | GRE (Greece) | FIN (Finland) | GER (Germany) | AUS (Australia) | FRA (France) | ESP (Spain) | GBR (United Kingdom) | Pts |
|---|---|---|---|---|---|---|---|---|---|---|---|---|---|---|---|
| 1 | (France) Sébastien Loeb | 6 ^{2} | 1 ^{2} | 2 ^{1} | 3 ^{3} | 1 ^{3} | 1 ^{3} | 2 ^{2} | 1 | 2 ^{1} | 10 ^{1} | Ret | 1 ^{3} | Ret | 222 |
| 2 | (Finland) Mikko Hirvonen | 1 | 2 ^{1} | 4 | 4 ^{2} | 2 ^{1} | 2 ^{2} | 3 ^{3} | 4 ^{1} | 4 | 1 | 3 | 2 | Ret | 214 |
| 3 | (France) Sébastien Ogier | 4 ^{1} | Ret | 1 ^{3} | 1 ^{1} | 4 | 3 | 1 ^{1} | 3 ^{3} | 1 ^{2} | 11 | 1 ^{3} | Ret | 11^{1} | 196 |
| 4 | (Finland) Jari-Matti Latvala | 3 ^{3} | 3 | 3 ^{2} | 2 | 18^{2} | 7 | 9 | 2 ^{2} | 14 | 2 ^{2} | 4 ^{1} | 3 | 1 ^{3} | 172 |
| 5 | (Norway) Petter Solberg | 5 | 4 ^{3} | 6 | Ret | 3 | 4 ^{1} | 4 | 5 | 5 ^{3} | 3 ^{3} | EX | Ret | Ret | 110 |
| 6 | (Norway) Mads Østberg | 2 | 5 | 31 | 13 | 5 | 5 | 12 | 6 | Ret | | 7 | 6 | 2 | 88 |
| 7 | (United Kingdom) Matthew Wilson | 9 | Ret | 5 | 5 | 9 | 8 | 6 | 8 | 11 | 4 | 10 | Ret | 5 | 63 |
| 8 | (Spain) Dani Sordo | | | | | 6 | | | Ret | 3 | | 2 ^{2} | 4 ^{2} | 19 ^{2} | 59 |
| 9 | (Norway) Henning Solberg | Ret | 6 | 9 | 14 | Ret | DNS | 5 | 7 | 7 | 14 | 6 | 8 | 3 | 59 |
| 10 | (Finland) Kimi Räikkönen | 8 | | 7 | 6 | | | 7 | 9 | 6 | WD | Ret | Ret | Ret | 34 |
| 11 | (United Kingdom) Kris Meeke | | | | | Ret | | | Ret | Ret | | Ret | 5 ^{1} | 4 | 25 |
| 12 | (Netherlands) Dennis Kuipers | 13 | Ret | 10 | 9 | Ret | | 10 | 11 | 10 | | 5 | 9 | 8 | 21 |
| 13 | (Argentina) Federico Villagra | | 9 | 8 | 7 | 17 | 6 | Ret | | | | | 16 | | 20 |
| 14 | (United Arab Emirates) Khalid Al Qassimi | 10 | | 14 | 8 | 13 | | | 14 | | 5 | 12 | 12 | | 15 |
| 15 | (Estonia) Ott Tänak | | 10 | | | 7 | | Ret | 13 | 12 | | 11 | 27 | 6 | 15 |
| 16 | (Finland) Juho Hänninen | | 8 | | | 8 | | 8 | 10 | 20 | | 26 | 10 | | 14 |
| 17 | (Russia) Evgeny Novikov | | Ret | | | 14 | | 20 | Ret | | Ret | 23 | 7 | 7 | 12 |
| 18 | (New Zealand) Hayden Paddon | | | 11 | | | 9 | | 19 | | 6 | | 34 | 13 | 10 |
| 19 | (Czech Republic) Martin Prokop | 12 | 7 | | | 10 | | 15 | 12 | 30 | | 14 | 13 | 21 | 7 |
| 20 | (Sweden) Per-Gunnar Andersson | 7 | | | | 15 | | | 15 | | | | | | 6 |
| 21 | (Poland) Michał Kościuszko | | | 24 | | | 20 | | 25 | | 7 | | 22 | 15 | 6 |
| 22 | (United States) Ken Block | 14 | 12 | DNS | | | 18 | | | 17 | 19 | 8 | Ret | 9 | 6 |
| 23 | (Portugal) Armindo Araújo | | | Ret | | 12 | | Ret | 20 | 8 | | Ret | Ret | 10 | 5 |
| 24 | (Ukraine) Oleksandr Saliuk, Jr. | 32 | | 20 | | | | | Ret | | 8 | | 30 | 25 | 4 |
| 25 | (Netherlands) Peter van Merksteijn Jr. | | | 22 | Ret | Ret | Ret | Ret | | 9 | 13 | Ret | 17 | Ret | 2 |
| 26 | (Mexico) Benito Guerra | | 12 | 18 | | | 15 | | Ret | | 9 | | 24 | Ret | 2 |
| 27 | (France) Pierre Campana | | | | | | | | | 18 | | 9 | DNS | | 2 |
| 28 | (Portugal) Bernardo Sousa | | | Ret | 10 | Ret | | 11 | 24 | 35 | | 15 | Ret | | 1 |
| 29 | (Sweden) Patrik Flodin | EX | | 29 | | 19 | 10 | | 22 | 27 | | | 21 | 14 | 1 |
| Pos. | Driver | SWE (Sweden) | MEX (Mexico) | POR (Portugal) | JOR (Jordan) | ITA (Italy) | ARG (Argentina) | GRE (Greece) | FIN (Finland) | GER (Germany) | AUS (Australia) | FRA (France) | ESP (Spain) | GBR (United Kingdom) | Pts |

Key
| Colour | Result |
|---|---|
| Gold | Winner |
| Silver | 2nd place |
| Bronze | 3rd place |
| Green | Points finish |
| Blue | Non-points finish |
| Blue | Non-classified finish (NC) |
| Purple | Did not finish (Ret) |
| Black | Excluded (EX) |
| Black | Disqualified (DSQ) |
| White | Did not start (DNS) |
| White | Cancelled (C) |
| Blank | Withdrew entry from the event (WD) |

- Sébastien Loeb secured the drivers' championship title in Wales.

Notes:

- ^{1} ^{2} ^{3} refers to the classification of the drivers on the 'Power Stage', where bonus points are awarded 3–2–1 for the fastest three drivers on the stage.

==== Co-drivers' championship ====
| Pos. | Driver | SWE (Sweden) | MEX (Mexico) | POR (Portugal) | JOR (Jordan) | ITA (Italy) | ARG (Argentina) | GRE (Greece) | FIN (Finland) | GER (Germany) | AUS (Australia) | FRA (France) | ESP (Spain) | GBR (United Kingdom) | Pts |
|---|---|---|---|---|---|---|---|---|---|---|---|---|---|---|---|
| 1 | (Monaco) Daniel Elena | 6 ^{2} | 1 ^{2} | 2 ^{1} | 3 ^{3} | 1 ^{3} | 1 ^{3} | 2 ^{2} | 1 | 2 ^{1} | 10 ^{1} | Ret | 1 ^{3} | Ret | 222 |
| 2 | (Finland) Jarmo Lehtinen | 1 | 2 ^{1} | 4 | 4 ^{2} | 2 ^{1} | 2 ^{2} | 3 ^{3} | 4 ^{1} | 4 | 1 | 3 | 2 | Ret | 214 |
| 3 | (France) Julien Ingrassia | 4 ^{1} | Ret | 1 ^{3} | 1 ^{1} | 4 | 3 | 1 ^{1} | 3 ^{3} | 1 ^{2} | 11 | 1 ^{3} | Ret | 11^{1} | 196 |
| 4 | (Finland) Miikka Anttila | 3 ^{3} | 3 | 3 ^{2} | 2 | 18 ^{2} | 7 | 9 | 2 ^{2} | 14 | 2 ^{2} | 4 ^{1} | 3 | 1 ^{3} | 172 |
| 5 | (United Kingdom) Chris Patterson | 5 | 4 ^{3} | 6 | Ret | 3 | 4 ^{1} | 4 | 5 | 5 ^{3} | 3 ^{3} | EX | Ret | Ret | 110 |
| 6 | (Sweden) Jonas Andersson | 2 | 5 | 31 | 13 | 5 | 5 | 12 | 6 | Ret | | 7 | 6 | 2 | 88 |
| 7 | (United Kingdom) Scott Martin | 9 | Ret | 5 | 5 | 9 | 8 | 6 | 8 | 11 | 4 | 10 | Ret | 5 | 63 |
| 8 | (Spain) Carlos del Barrio | | | | 6 | | | Ret | 3 | | 2 ^{2} | 4 ^{2} | 20 ^{2} | 59 | |
| 9 | (Austria) Ilka Minor | Ret | 6 | 9 | 14 | Ret | DNS | 5 | 7 | 7 | 14 | 6 | 8 | 3 | 59 |
| 10 | (Finland) Kaj Lindström | 8 | | 7 | 6 | | | 7 | 9 | 6 | WD | Ret | Ret | Ret | 34 |
| 11 | (Republic of Ireland) Paul Nagle | | | | Ret | | | Ret | Ret | | Ret | 5 ^{1} | 4 | 25 | |
| 12 | (Argentina) Jorge Pérez Companc | | 9 | 8 | 7 | 17 | 6 | | | | 20 | | | | |
| 13 | (Belgium) Frédéric Miclotte | 13 | Ret | 10 | | Ret | | 10 | 11 | 10 | | 5 | 9 | 8 | 19 |
| 14 | (United Kingdom) Michael Orr | 10 | | 14 | 8 | 13 | | | 14 | | 5 | 12 | 12 | | 15 |
| 15 | (Estonia) Kuldar Sikk | | 10 | | | 7 | | Ret | 13 | 12 | | 11 | 27 | 6 | 15 |
| 16 | (Finland) Mikko Markkula | | 8 | | | 8 | | 8 | 10 | 20 | | 26 | 10 | | 14 |
| 17 | (France) Denis Giraudet | | Ret | | | 14 | | 20 | Ret | | Ret | 23 | 7 | 7 | 12 |
| 18 | (New Zealand) John Kennard | | | 11 | | | 9 | | 19 | | 6 | | 34 | 13 | 10 |
| 19 | (Czech Republic) Jan Tománek | 12 | 7 | | | 10 | | 15 | 12 | 30 | | 14 | 13 | 22 | 7 |
| 20 | (Sweden) Emil Axelsson | 7 | | | | 15 | | | 15 | | | | | | 6 |
| 21 | (Poland) Maciej Szczepaniak | | | 24 | | | 20 | | 25 | | 7 | | 22 | 16 | 6 |
| 22 | (Italy) Alex Gelsomino | 14 | 12 | DNS | | | 18 | | | 17 | 19 | 8 | Ret | 9 | 6 |
| 23 | (Portugal) Miguel Ramalho | | | Ret | | 12 | | Ret | 20 | 8 | | Ret | Ret | 10 | 5 |
| 24 | (Ukraine) Pavlo Cherepin | 32 | | 20 | | | | | Ret | | 8 | | 30 | 25 | 4 |
| 25 | (Belgium) Erwin Mombaert | | | | 9 | 13 | Ret | 17 | Ret | 2 | | | | | |
| 26 | (Belgium) Bjorn Degandt | | | | 9 | | | WD | | 13 | | | | | 2 |
| 27 | (Spain) Borja Rozada | | 12 | 18 | | | 15 | | Ret | | 9 | | 24 | Ret | 2 |
| 28 | (France) Sabrina de Castelli | | | | | | | | | 18 | | 9 | DNS | | 2 |
| 29 | (Portugal) António Costa | | | Ret | 10 | Ret | | 11 | 24 | 35 | | 15 | Ret | | 1 |
| 30 | (Sweden) Maria Andersson | | | | | | 10 | | | | | | | | 1 |
| Pos. | Driver | SWE (Sweden) | MEX (Mexico) | POR (Portugal) | JOR (Jordan) | ITA (Italy) | ARG (Argentina) | GRE (Greece) | FIN (Finland) | GER (Germany) | AUS (Australia) | FRA (France) | ESP (Spain) | GBR (United Kingdom) | Pts |

Semua

==== Manufacturers' championship ====
| Pos. | Manufacturer | No. | SWE (Sweden) | MEX (Mexico) | POR (Portugal) | JOR (Jordan) | ITA (Italy) | ARG (Argentina) | GRE (Greece) | FIN (Finland) | GER (Germany) | AUS (Australia) | FRA (France) | ESP (Spain) | GBR (United Kingdom) | Points |
|---|---|---|---|---|---|---|---|---|---|---|---|---|---|---|---|---|
| 1 | (France) Citroën Total World Rally Team | 1 | 5 | 1 | 2 | 3 | 1 | 1 | 2 | 1 | 2 | 6 | Ret | 1 | Ret | 403 |
| 1 | (France) Citroën Total World Rally Team | 2 | 4 | Ret | 1 | 1 | 4 | 3 | 1 | 3 | 1 | 7 | 1 | Ret | 7 | 403 |
| 2 | (United Kingdom) Ford Abu Dhabi World Rally Team | 3 | 1 | 2 | 4 | 4 | 2 | 2 | 3 | 4 | 3 | 1 | 2 | 2 | Ret | 376 |
| 2 | (United Kingdom) Ford Abu Dhabi World Rally Team | 4 | 3 | 3 | 3 | 2 | 9 | 7 | 7 | 2 | 9 | 2 | 3 | 3 | 1 | 376 |
| 3 | (United Kingdom) M-Sport Stobart Ford World Rally Team | 5 | Ret | 6 | 8 | 10 | 6 | 8 | 5 | 7 | 8 | 4 | 7 | Ret | 3 | 178 |
| 3 | (United Kingdom) M-Sport Stobart Ford World Rally Team | 6 | 2 | 5 | 12 | 9 | 5 | 5 | 9 | 6 | Ret | Ret | 5 | 4 | 2 | 178 |
| 4 | (Norway) Petter Solberg World Rally Team | 11 | | 4 | 5 | Ret | 3 | 4 | 4 | 5 | 4 | 3 | EX | Ret | Ret | 98 |
| 5 | (Netherlands) FERM Power Tools World Rally Team | 9 | 8 | Ret | 9 | 8 | Ret | | 8 | 9 | 7 | | 4 | 5 | 5 | 54 |
| 6 | (United Arab Emirates) Team Abu Dhabi | 10 | 7 | | 10 | 7 | 7 | | | 10 | | 5 | 8 | 6 | 4 | 54 |
| 7 | (Argentina) Munchi's Ford World Rally Team | 7 | | 7 | 7 | 6 | 8 | 6 | Ret | | | | | 7 | | 38 |
| 8 | (United States) Monster World Rally Team | 43 | 9 | 8 | DNS | | | 9 | | | 10 | 9 | 6 | Ret | 6 | 27 |
| 9 | (Netherlands) Van Merksteijn Motorsport | 14 | | | 11 | Ret | Ret | Ret | Ret | | 6 | 8 | Ret | 8 | Ret | 16 |
| 10 | Brazil World Rally Team | 12 | | | Ret | 11 | 10 | Ret | Ret | 11 | Ret | Ret | Ret | 9 | 8 | 7 |
| EX | (Finland) ICE 1 Racing^{†} | 8 | 6 | | 6 | 5 | | | 6 | 8 | 5 | | | | | 48 |
| Pos. | Manufacturer | No. | SWE (Sweden) | MEX (Mexico) | POR (Portugal) | JOR (Jordan) | ITA (Italy) | ARG (Argentina) | GRE (Greece) | FIN (Finland) | GER (Germany) | AUS (Australia) | FRA (France) | ESP (Spain) | GBR (United Kingdom) | Points |

Key
| Colour | Result |
|---|---|
| Gold | Winner |
| Silver | 2nd place |
| Bronze | 3rd place |
| Green | Points finish |
| Blue | Non-points finish |
| Blue | Non-classified finish (NC) |
| Purple | Did not finish (Ret) |
| Black | Excluded (EX) |
| Black | Disqualified (DSQ) |
| White | Did not start (DNS) |
| White | Cancelled (C) |
| Blank | Withdrew entry from the event (WD) |

- Citroën secured the manufacturers' championship in Catalunya.
- † – ICE 1 Racing was excluded from the manufacturers' championship after they failed to take part in Rally Australia. As the team is considered to be a WRC entry (as opposed to a development entry, like the Mini WRC Team), it was obligated to take part in at least two rounds of the championship outside Europe. Driver Kimi Räikkönen had previously taken part in Rally Jordan, but had not competed in any further events outside Europe, and Rally Australia was the final flyaway round of the championship.

==== SWRC Drivers' championship ====
| Pos. | Driver | MEX (Mexico) | JOR (Jordan) | ITA (Italy) | GRE (Greece) | FIN (Finland) | GER (Germany) | FRA (France) | ESP (Spain) | Pts |
|---|---|---|---|---|---|---|---|---|---|---|
| 1 | (Finland) Juho Hänninen | 2 | | 2 | 1 | 1 | 4 | 5 | 1 | 133 |
| 2 | (Estonia) Ott Tänak | 3 | | 1 | Ret | 3 | 1 | 1 | 6 | 113 |
| 3 | (Czech Republic) Martin Prokop | 1 | | 3 | 5 | 2 | 6 | 3 | 3 | 106 |
| 4 | (Portugal) Bernardo Sousa | | 1 | Ret | 2 | 6 | 8 | 4 | Ret | 67 |
| 5 | (Germany) Hermann Gassner, Jr. | | 3 | 5 | 4 | 4 | 7 | Ret | 5 | 65 |
| 6 | (Estonia) Karl Kruuda | 4 | 2 | 6 | 8 | 7 | 5 | | 7 | 64 |
| 7 | (Qatar) Nasser Al-Attiyah | EX | Ret | 4 | 6 | | 2 | Ret | 2 | 56 |
| 8 | (Norway) Eyvind Brynildsen | | 5 | Ret | 7 | Ret | DNS | 2 | DNS | 34 |
| 9 | (Andorra) Albert Llovera | | 4 | Ret | 9 | Ret | | DNS | 8 | 18 |
| 10 | (Republic of Ireland) Craig Breen | | | | | | | | 4 | 12 |
| 11 | (France) Juilen Maurin | | | | | | | 6 | | 8 |
| 12 | (Finland) Juha Salo | | | | | 8 | | | | 4 |
| 13 | (Germany) Felix Herbold | | | | | | 9 | | | 2 |
| EX | (Hungary) Frigyes Turán | | Ret | 7 | 3 | 5 | 3 | Ret | | 0† |
| Pos. | Driver | MEX (Mexico) | JOR (Jordan) | ITA (Italy) | GRE (Greece) | FIN (Finland) | GER (Germany) | FRA (France) | ESP (Spain) | Pts |

Key
| Colour | Result |
|---|---|
| Gold | Winner |
| Silver | 2nd place |
| Bronze | 3rd place |
| Green | Points finish |
| Blue | Non-points finish |
| Blue | Non-classified finish (NC) |
| Purple | Did not finish (Ret) |
| Black | Excluded (EX) |
| Black | Disqualified (DSQ) |
| White | Did not start (DNS) |
| White | Cancelled (C) |
| Blank | Withdrew entry from the event (WD) |

- † Frigyes Turán Excluded from Championship

==== PWRC Drivers' championship ====
| Pos. | Driver | SWE (Sweden) | POR (Portugal) | ARG (Argentina) | FIN (Finland) | AUS (Australia) | ESP (Spain) | GBR (United Kingdom) | Pts |
|---|---|---|---|---|---|---|---|---|---|
| 1 | (New Zealand) Hayden Paddon | | 1 | 1 | 1 | 1 | 8 | | 104 |
| 2 | (Sweden) Patrik Flodin | EX | 10 | 2 | 3 | | 1 | 1 | 84 |
| 3 | (Poland) Michał Kościuszko | | 7 | 10 | 5 | 2 | 2 | 2 | 71 |
| 4 | (Czech Republic) Martin Semerád | 1 | 3 | 5 | Ret | | 10 | EX | 51 |
| 5 | (Peru) Nicolàs Fuchs | 3 | Ret | 4 | Ret | | 6 | 3 | 50 |
| 6 | (Mexico) Benito Guerra | | 4 | 6 | Ret | 4 | 3 | Ret | 47 |
| 7 | (Ukraine) Valeriy Gorban | 4 | 5 | | 7 | 5 | 7 | 9 | 46 |
| 8 | (Ukraine) Oleksandr Saliuk, Jr. | 7 | 6 | | Ret | 3 | 5 | 8 | 45 |
| 9 | (Russia) Dmitry Tagirov | 6 | 12 | 3 | 9 | | Ret | 4 | 37 |
| 10 | (Italy) Gianluca Linari | 5 | Ret | 8 | | 6 | Ret | DNS | 22 |
| 11 | (Finland) Jarkko Nikara | | | | 2 | | | Ret | 18 |
| 12 | (United Arab Emirates) Majed Al Shamsi | 8 | 8 | | Ret | 11 | Ret | 5 | 18 |
| 13 | (United Arab Emirates) Bader Al Jabri | Ret | 9 | | Ret | 10 | 4 | Ret | 15 |
| 14 | (Ukraine) Oleksiy Kikireshko | Ret | 11 | | 8 | Ret | 9 | 6 | 14 |
| 15 | (Finland) Mikko Pajunen | | | | 6 | | | | 8 |
| 16 | (United Kingdom) Harry Hunt | | 13 | 11 | Ret | 9 | Ret | 7 | 8 |
| 17 | (Argentina) Ezequiel Campos | | | 7 | | | | | 6 |
| 18 | (Australia) Brendan Reeves | | | | | 7 | | | 6 |
| 19 | (Australia) Nathan Quinn | | | | | 8 | | | 4 |
| EX | (Finland) Jukka Ketomäki | Ret | 2 | | 4 | Ret | Ret | DNS | 0† |
| EX | (Ukraine) Yuriy Protasov | 2 | Ret | 9 | DNS | | | | 0† |
| Pos. | Driver | SWE (Sweden) | POR (Portugal) | ARG (Argentina) | FIN (Finland) | AUS (Australia) | ESP (Spain) | GBR (United Kingdom) | Pts |

Key
| Colour | Result |
|---|---|
| Gold | Winner |
| Silver | 2nd place |
| Bronze | 3rd place |
| Green | Points finish |
| Blue | Non-points finish |
| Blue | Non-classified finish (NC) |
| Purple | Did not finish (Ret) |
| Black | Excluded (EX) |
| Black | Disqualified (DSQ) |
| White | Did not start (DNS) |
| White | Cancelled (C) |
| Blank | Withdrew entry from the event (WD) |

- † Excluded from Championship

==== WRC Academy Drivers' championship ====
| Pos. | Driver | POR (Portugal) | ITA (Italy) | FIN (Finland) | GER (Germany) | FRA (France) | GBR (United Kingdom) | Pts |
|---|---|---|---|---|---|---|---|---|
| 1 | (Republic of Ireland) Craig Breen | Ret ^{5} | 8 ^{4} | 2 ^{5} | 1 ^{5} | Ret ^{6} | 1 ^{14} | 111 |
| 2 | (Estonia) Egon Kaur | 1 ^{3} | 1 ^{5} | 1 ^{5} | 8 | Ret | 2 ^{1} | 111 |
| 3 | (United Kingdom) Alastair Fisher | 5 ^{2} | Ret | Ret ^{4} | 9 | 1 ^{3} | 3 ^{1} | 62 |
| 4 | (Spain) Yeray Lemes | Ret ^{1} | Ret | 6 ^{1} | 2 ^{7} | 3 ^{6} | 9 | 58 |
| 5 | (Australia) Brendan Reeves | 4 | 5 ^{2} | 4 | 13 | Ret | 14 ^{1} | 37 |
| 6 | (Italy) Andrea Crugnola | 7 | 6 ^{2} | Ret | 3 | Ret | 8 | 35 |
| 7 | (Czech Republic) Jan Černý | Ret | 4 | 5 | 5 ^{1} | Ret | Ret | 33 |
| 8 | (Germany) Christian Riedemann | 3 | Ret | 7 | | Ret | 4 | 33 |
| 9 | (Spain) José Suarez | Ret | Ret | 10 | 4 | 2 ^{1} | 11 | 32 |
| 10 | (Sweden) Fredrik Åhlin | Ret ^{1} | 3 | Ret ^{1} | 6 | 8 | 13 | 29 |
| 11 | (Australia) Molly Taylor | 8 | Ret | 9 | 14 | 5 | 5 ^{1} | 27 |
| 12 | (Netherlands) Timo van den Marel | 10 | Ret | 3 | 10 | 6 | Ret | 25 |
| 13 | (Estonia) Miko-Ove Niinemäe | Ret | 7 | 8 | 11 | 7 | 10 | 17 |
| 14 | (Russia) Sergey Karyakin | Ret | Ret | 11 | 12 | Ret | 6 | 8 |
| 15 | (Argentina) Miguel Baldoni | 6 | 2 | Ret | Ret | | | 1† |
| 16 | (Sweden) Victor Henriksson | 2 ^{1} | Ret ^{1} | Ret | DNS | | | −5† |
| 17 | (Italy) Matteo Brunello | 9 | Ret | | | | | −23† |
| 18 | (Sweden) Calle Ward | Ret | Ret | | | | | −25† |
| Pos. | Driver | POR (Portugal) | ITA (Italy) | FIN (Finland) | GER (Germany) | FRA (France) | GBR (United Kingdom) | Pts |

Key
| Colour | Result |
|---|---|
| Gold | Winner |
| Silver | 2nd place |
| Bronze | 3rd place |
| Green | Points finish |
| Blue | Non-points finish |
| Blue | Non-classified finish (NC) |
| Purple | Did not finish (Ret) |
| Black | Excluded (EX) |
| Black | Disqualified (DSQ) |
| White | Did not start (DNS) |
| White | Cancelled (C) |
| Blank | Withdrew entry from the event (WD) |

- Note: ^{1} refers to the number of stages won, where a bonus point is awarded per stage win.
- † Deducted 25 points
