= 2011 Rally Sweden =

Part of the 2011 World Rally Championship

2011 Rally Sweden 59th Uddeholm Swedish Rally
Round 1 of the 2011 World Rally Championship
Next event →
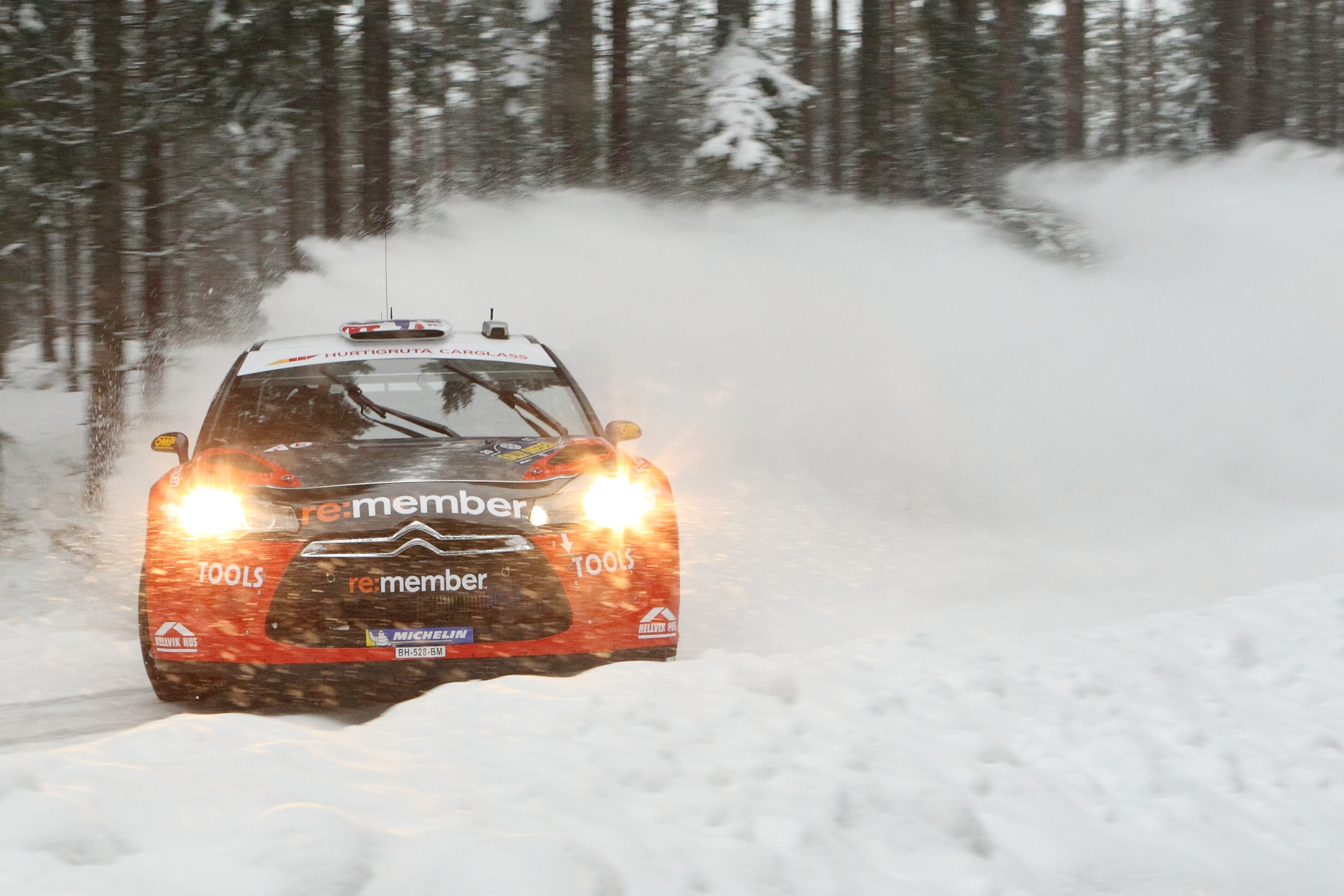
- Host country: Sweden
- Rally base: Karlstad, Sweden
- Dates run: February 10 – 13 2011
- Stages: 22 (351.00 km; 218.10 miles)
- Stage surface: Snow- and Ice-covered gravel
- Overall distance: 2,059.89 km (1,279.96 miles)

Statistics
- Crews: 44 at start, 34 at finish

Overall results
- Overall winner: (Finland) Mikko Hirvonen (United Kingdom) Ford World Rally Team

The 2011 Rally Sweden was the opening round of 2011 World Rally Championship season. It was the season's first and only event held on snow- and ice-covered gravel roads. The rally took place over 10–13 February, beginning with a Super Special Stage in the event's base town of Karlstad. The rally was also the first round of the Production World Rally Championship.

The rally saw a beginning to a new era in the World Rally Championship, with the previous generation of WRC machinery such as the Citroën C4 and the Ford Focus being phased out in favour of cars with a displacement of 1.6 litres (98 cu in). Citroën will use their DS3 model, and Ford will use the Fiesta RS over the course of the 2011 season. Also introduced for the 2011 season is the Power Stage, in which the final stage of each rally will award bonus points towards the championship standings. The fastest driver on the stage, will receive three points with two for the second-fastest and one for the third-fastest.

Mikko Hirvonen took the 13th WRC win of his career, and his first victory since winning the same event in 2010, having overhauled Mads Østberg midway through the second day. Østberg took his best result in the championship, finishing on the podium for the first time just 6.5 seconds behind Hirvonen. The podium was completed by another Ford driver, as Hirvonen's teammate Jari-Matti Latvala finished third, 34 seconds behind Hirvonen. Sébastien Ogier finished as the best Citroën driver in fourth place, and also picked up maximum bonus points with his victory on the first Power Stage of the season. Fellow Citroën driver Petter Solberg rounded out the top five places, despite losing his licence before the final stage due to a speeding infringement on Friday afternoon. As per the country's law, the Swedish Police Authority had given Solberg 48 hours grace before he could no longer drive after being caught going at 112 km/h (70 mph) in an area where the limit was 80 km/h (50 mph). With the ban coming into effect prior to the final stage, Solberg's co-driver Chris Patterson had to drive the stage.

In the supporting PWRC class, Martin Semerád took his first victory by over five minutes ahead of Yuriy Protasov.

== Results ==
=== Event standings ===
Pos.	Driver	Co-driver	Car	Time	Difference	Points
Overall
1.	(Finland) Mikko Hirvonen	(Finland) Jarmo Lehtinen	Ford Fiesta RS WRC	3:23:56.6	0.0	25
2.	(Norway) Mads Østberg	(Sweden) Jonas Andersson	Ford Fiesta RS WRC	3:24:03.1	6.5	18
3.	(Finland) Jari-Matti Latvala	(Finland) Miikka Anttila	Ford Fiesta RS WRC	3:24:30.6	34.0	16
4.	(France) Sébastien Ogier	(France) Julien Ingrassia	Citroën DS3 WRC	3:24:44.3	47.7	15
5.	(Norway) Petter Solberg	(United Kingdom) Chris Patterson	Citroën DS3 WRC	3:25:27.8	1:31.2	10
6.	(France) Sébastien Loeb	(Monaco) Daniel Elena	Citroën DS3 WRC	3:26:26.9	2:30.3	10
7.	(Sweden) Per-Gunnar Andersson	(Sweden) Emil Axelsson	Ford Fiesta RS WRC	3:30:18.6	6:22.0	6
8.	(Finland) Kimi Räikkönen	(Finland) Kaj Lindström	Citroën DS3 WRC	3:30:58.9	7:02.3	4
9.	(United Kingdom) Matthew Wilson	(United Kingdom) Scott Martin	Ford Fiesta RS WRC	3:34:08.1	10:11.5	2
10.	(United Arab Emirates) Khalid Al Qassimi	(United Kingdom) Michael Orr	Ford Fiesta RS WRC	3:34:27.7	10:31.1	1
PWRC
1. (16.)	(Czech Republic) Martin Semerád	(Czech Republic) Michal Ernst	Mitsubishi Lancer Evo IX	3:46:59.8	0.0	25
2. (19.)	(Ukraine) Yuriy Protasov	(Ukraine) Adrian Aftanaziv	Mitsubishi Lancer Evo X	3:52:17.1	5:17.3	18
3. (21.)	(Peru) Nicolás Fuchs	(Argentina) Rubén Francisco García	Mitsubishi Lancer Evo IX	3:53:43.9	6:44.1	15
4. (22.)	(Ukraine) Valeriy Gorban	(Ukraine) Evgen Leonov	Mitsubishi Lancer Evo IX	3:53:49.3	6:49.5	12
5. (28.)	(Italy) Gianluca Linari	(Italy) Paolo Gregoriani	Subaru Impreza WRX STI	4:14:45.3	27:45.5	10
6. (31.)	(Russia) Dmitry Tagirov	(Russia) Anna Zavershinskaya	Subaru Impreza WRX STI	4:21:53.4	34:53.6	8
7. (32.)	(Ukraine) Oleksandr Saliuk, Jr.	(Ukraine) Pavlo Cherepin	Mitsubishi Lancer Evo IX	4:22:52.5	35:52.7	6
8. (33.)	(United Arab Emirates) Majed Al Shamsi	(United Arab Emirates) Khalid Al Kedi	Subaru Impreza WRX STI	4:29:52.6	42:52.8	4

=== Special stages ===
All dates and times are CET (UTC+1).

Day	Stage	Time	Name	Length	Winner	Time	Avg. spd.	Rally leader
Leg 1 (10–11 Feb)	SS1	20:04	Karlstad Super Special Stage 1	1.90 km	(Sweden) Per-Gunnar Andersson	1:39.7	68.61 km/h	(Sweden) Per-Gunnar Andersson
Leg 1 (10–11 Feb)	SS2	07:58	Vargåsen 1	24.63 km	(Norway) Mads Østberg	14:41.9	100.54 km/h	(Norway) Mads Østberg
Leg 1 (10–11 Feb)	SS3	09:39	Likenäs 1	20.78 km	(Sweden) Per-Gunnar Andersson	12:10.1	102.46 km/h	(Norway) Mads Østberg
Leg 1 (10–11 Feb)	SS4	10:55	Løvhaugen 1	19.26 km	(Norway) Mads Østberg	11:36.5	99.55 km/h	(Norway) Mads Østberg
Leg 1 (10–11 Feb)	SS5	14:13	Vargåsen 2	24.63 km	(Sweden) Per-Gunnar Andersson (Norway) Mads Østberg	14:05.0	104.93 km/h	(Norway) Mads Østberg
Leg 1 (10–11 Feb)	SS6	15:54	Likenäs 2	20.78 km	(France) Sébastien Ogier	11:39.5	106.94 km/h	(Norway) Mads Østberg
Leg 1 (10–11 Feb)	SS7	17:10	Løvhaugen 2	19.26 km	(Finland) Jari-Matti Latvala	10:49.7	106.72 km/h	(Norway) Mads Østberg
Leg 2 (12 Feb)	SS8	08:00	Lesjöfors 1	15.00 km	(France) Sébastien Loeb	9:38.4	93.36 km/h	(Norway) Mads Østberg
Leg 2 (12 Feb)	SS9	09:01	Sågen 1	14.23 km	(Norway) Petter Solberg	7:44.0	110.41 km/h	(Norway) Mads Østberg
Leg 2 (12 Feb)	SS10	10:06	Fredriksberg 1	18.15 km	(Sweden) Per-Gunnar Andersson	10:55.8	99.63 km/h	(Norway) Mads Østberg
Leg 2 (12 Feb)	SS11	11:08	Värmullsåsen 1	15.42 km	(Norway) Petter Solberg	8:40.2	107.40 km/h	(Finland) Mikko Hirvonen
Leg 2 (12 Feb)	SS12	13:26	Lesjöfors 2	15.00 km	(France) Sébastien Loeb	9:35.3	93.86 km/h	(Finland) Mikko Hirvonen
Leg 2 (12 Feb)	SS13	14:27	Sågen 2	14.23 km	(France) Sébastien Loeb	7:50.1	108.97 km/h	(Finland) Mikko Hirvonen
Leg 2 (12 Feb)	SS14	15:32	Fredriksberg 2	18.15 km	(France) Sébastien Ogier	11:02.2	98.67 km/h	(Finland) Mikko Hirvonen
Leg 2 (12 Feb)	SS15	16:34	Värmullsåsen 2	15.42 km	(France) Sébastien Loeb	8:45.7	105.60 km/h	(Finland) Mikko Hirvonen
Leg 2 (12 Feb)	SS16	20:00	Karlstad Super Special Stage 2	1.90 km	(Norway) Petter Solberg	1:38.9	69.16 km/h	(Finland) Mikko Hirvonen
Leg 3 (13 Feb)	SS17	07:51	Torntorp 1	19.21 km	(Finland) Mikko Hirvonen	9:49.2	117.37 km/h	(Finland) Mikko Hirvonen
Leg 3 (13 Feb)	SS18	08:43	Gustavsfors 1	4.16 km	(Finland) Mikko Hirvonen	2:22.1	105.39 km/h	(Finland) Mikko Hirvonen
Leg 3 (13 Feb)	SS19	09:37	Rämmen 1	22.76 km	(Finland) Mikko Hirvonen	11:55.3	114.55 km/h	(Finland) Mikko Hirvonen
Leg 3 (13 Feb)	SS20	12:09	Torntorp 2	19.21 km	(Finland) Jari-Matti Latvala	10:00.0	115.26 km/h	(Finland) Mikko Hirvonen
Leg 3 (13 Feb)	SS21	13:31	Rämmen 2	22.76 km	(Finland) Jari-Matti Latvala	12:12.9	111.80 km/h	(Finland) Mikko Hirvonen
Leg 3 (13 Feb)	SS22	15:08	Gustavsfors 2 (Power Stage)	4.16 km	(France) Sébastien Ogier	2:22.7	104.95 km/h	(Finland) Mikko Hirvonen

=== Power Stage ===
The first ever "Power stage", a live televised 4.16 km short stage at the end of the rally, was held near the village of Gustavsfors.

Pos	Driver	Time	Diff.	Avg. speed	Points
1	(France) Sébastien Ogier	2:22.7	0.0	104.95 km/h	3
2	(France) Sébastien Loeb	2:23.0	+0.3	104.73 km/h	2
3	(Finland) Jari-Matti Latvala	2:23.4	+0.7	104.44 km/h	1

=== Standings after the rally ===
Drivers' Championship standings

Pos.	Driver	Points
1	(Finland) Mikko Hirvonen	25
2	(Norway) Mads Ostberg	18
3	(Finland) Jari-Matti Latvala	16
4	(France) Sebastien Ogier	15
5	(Norway) Petter Solberg	10
6	(France) Sébastien Loeb	10
7	(Sweden) Per-Gunnar Andersson	6
8	(Finland) Kimi Räikkönen	4
9	(United Kingdom) Matthew Wilson	2
10	(United Arab Emirates) Khalid Al-Qassimi	1

Manufacturers' Championship standings

Pos.	Manufacturer	Points
1	(United Kingdom) BP Ford WRT	40
2	(France) Citroën WRT	22
3	(United Kingdom) Stobart Ford	18
4	(Finland) Ice 1 Racing	8
5	(United Arab Emirates) Team Abu Dhabi	6
6	(Netherlands) FERM Power Tools WRT	4
7	(United States) Monster WRT	2
