= 2011 Rally México =

2011 Rally México Rally Guanajuato México
Round 2 of the 2011 World Rally Championship
← Previous event	Next event →
- Host country: Mexico
- Rally base: León, Mexico
- Dates run: March 3 – 6 2011
- Stages: 22 (364.87 km; 226.72 miles)
- Stage surface: Gravel
- Overall distance: 1,031.30 km (640.82 miles)

Statistics
- Crews: 24 at start, 17 at finish

Overall results
- Overall winner: (France) Sébastien Loeb (France) Citroën Total WRT

The 2011 Rally México was the second round of the 2011 World Rally Championship season. It was the season's first event held on gravel roads. The rally took place over 3–6 March, beginning with a street stage in Guanajuato. The rally was also the first round of the Super 2000 World Rally Championship.

In an event in which all the leading contenders suffered some sort of trouble during the rally, Sébastien Loeb took the 63rd WRC win of his career, and his fifth victory in Mexico, taking advantage of teammate Sébastien Ogier's crash on the 20th stage and held on to win the event by over 90 seconds. Loeb had trailed Ogier heading into the final day, having picked up a 50-second penalty for starting the 15th stage late. Second place went to championship leader Mikko Hirvonen, who took the Power Stage victory, to take his total points earned on the rally to 21; while teammate Jari-Matti Latvala finished third, despite losing over four minutes on Friday. The Norwegian trio of Petter Solberg, Mads Østberg and Henning Solberg finished in fourth, fifth and sixth place respectively.

Nasser Al-Attiyah won the supporting SWRC class on the road, but was later excluded due to a technical infringement. Al-Attiyah's exclusion gave Martin Prokop victory in the class and seventh place overall, Juho Hänninen second in class and eighth overall, with Ott Tänak promoted onto the SWRC podium and into the overall points.

== Results ==
=== Event standings ===
Pos.	Driver	Co-driver	Car	Time	Difference	Points
Overall
1.	(France) Sébastien Loeb	(Monaco) Daniel Elena	Citroën DS3 WRC	3:53:17.0	0.0	27
2.	(Finland) Mikko Hirvonen	(Finland) Jarmo Lehtinen	Ford Fiesta RS WRC	3:54:55.4	1:38.4	21
3.	(Finland) Jari-Matti Latvala	(Finland) Miikka Anttila	Ford Fiesta RS WRC	3:55:40.9	2:23.9	15
4.	(Norway) Petter Solberg	(United Kingdom) Chris Patterson	Citroën DS3 WRC	4:00:35.4	7:18.4	13
5.	(Norway) Mads Østberg	(Sweden) Jonas Andersson	Ford Fiesta RS WRC	4:02:00.5	8:43.5	10
6.	(Norway) Henning Solberg	(Austria) Ilka Minor	Ford Fiesta RS WRC	4:03:07.0	9:50.0	8
7.	(Czech Republic) Martin Prokop	(Czech Republic) Jan Tománek	Ford Fiesta S2000	4:06:52.0	13:35.0	6
8.	(Finland) Juho Hänninen	(Finland) Mikko Markkula	Škoda Fabia S2000	4:08:05.7	14:48.7	4
9.	(Argentina) Federico Villagra	(Argentina) Jorge Pérez Companc	Ford Fiesta RS WRC	4:41:34.2	48:17.2	2
10.	(Estonia) Ott Tänak	(Estonia) Kuldar Sikk	Ford Fiesta S2000	4:46:59.8	53:42.8	1
SWRC
1. (7.)	(Czech Republic) Martin Prokop	(Czech Republic) Jan Tománek	Ford Fiesta S2000	4:06:52.0	0.0	25
2. (8.)	(Finland) Juho Hänninen	(Finland) Mikko Markkula	Škoda Fabia S2000	4:08:05.7	1:13.7	18
3. (10.)	(Estonia) Ott Tänak	(Estonia) Kuldar Sikk	Ford Fiesta S2000	4:46:59.8	40:07.8	15
4. (15.)	(Estonia) Karl Kruuda	(Estonia) Martin Järveoja	Škoda Fabia S2000	5:06:17.4	59:25.4	12

=== Special stages ===
All dates and times are CST (UTC−6).

Day	Stage	Time	Name	Length	Winner	Time	Avg. spd.	Rally leader
Leg 1 (3–4 Mar)	SS1	20:06	Guanajuato Street Stage	1.05 km	(Norway) Petter Solberg	0:53.2	71.05 km/h	(Norway) Petter Solberg
Leg 1 (3–4 Mar)	SS2	08:43	Alfaro 1	26.01 km	(France) Sébastien Ogier	15:30.7	100.61 km/h	(France) Sébastien Ogier
Leg 1 (3–4 Mar)	SS3	10:16	Ortega 1	23.83 km	(France) Sébastien Ogier	13:58.5	102.31 km/h	(France) Sébastien Ogier
Leg 1 (3–4 Mar)	SS4	11:04	El Cubilete 1	18.87 km	(France) Sébastien Loeb	11:42.1	96.76 km/h	(France) Sébastien Ogier
Leg 1 (3–4 Mar)	SS5	12:12	León Street Stage 1	1.33 km	(France) Sébastien Loeb	1:17.4	61.86 km/h	(France) Sébastien Loeb
Leg 1 (3–4 Mar)	SS6	13:47	Alfaro 2	26.01 km	(France) Sébastien Ogier	15:16.6	102.16 km/h	(France) Sébastien Ogier
Leg 1 (3–4 Mar)	SS7	15:20	Ortega 2	23.83 km	(France) Sébastien Ogier	13:48.0	103.61 km/h	(France) Sébastien Ogier
Leg 1 (3–4 Mar)	SS8	16:08	El Cubilete 2	18.87 km	(France) Sébastien Loeb	11:33.9	97.90 km/h	(France) Sébastien Ogier
Leg 1 (3–4 Mar)	SS9	19:45	Super Special 1	2.21 km	(France) Sébastien Loeb	1:39.7	79.80 km/h	(France) Sébastien Ogier
Leg 1 (3–4 Mar)	SS10	19:50	Super Special 2	2.21 km	(France) Sébastien Ogier	1:37.9	81.27 km/h	(France) Sébastien Ogier
Leg 2 (5 Mar)	SS11	08:54	Ibarrilla 1	29.90 km	(France) Sébastien Loeb	18:25.8	97.34 km/h	(France) Sébastien Loeb
Leg 2 (5 Mar)	SS12	10:17	Duarte 1	23.27 km	(Norway) Petter Solberg	17:57.8	77.72 km/h	(France) Sébastien Loeb
Leg 2 (5 Mar)	SS13	11:08	Derramadero 1	23.28 km	(Norway) Petter Solberg	13:58.7	99.93 km/h	(France) Sébastien Loeb
Leg 2 (5 Mar)	SS14	12:11	León Street Stage 2	1.33 km	(France) Sébastien Loeb	1:16.9	62.26 km/h	(France) Sébastien Loeb
Leg 2 (5 Mar)	SS15	13:57	Ibarrilla 2	29.90 km	(Norway) Petter Solberg	18:11.8	98.59 km/h	(France) Sébastien Ogier
Leg 2 (5 Mar)	SS16	15:20	Duarte 2	23.27 km	(Norway) Petter Solberg	17:34.2	79.46 km/h	(France) Sébastien Ogier
Leg 2 (5 Mar)	SS17	16:11	Derramadero 2	23.28 km	(Finland) Jari-Matti Latvala	13:49.7	101.01 km/h	(France) Sébastien Ogier
Leg 2 (5 Mar)	SS18	19:43	Super Special 3	2.21 km	(France) Sébastien Loeb	1:38.4	80.85 km/h	(France) Sébastien Ogier
Leg 2 (5 Mar)	SS19	19:48	Super Special 4	2.21 km	(France) Sébastien Loeb	1:37.0	82.02 km/h	(France) Sébastien Ogier
Leg 3 (6 Mar)	SS20	08:28	Guanajuatito	29.13 km	(France) Sébastien Loeb	20:10.2	86.65 km/h	(France) Sébastien Loeb
Leg 3 (6 Mar)	SS21	09:51	Comanjilla	24.59 km	(Finland) Jari-Matti Latvala	15:11.3	97.14 km/h	(France) Sébastien Loeb
Leg 3 (6 Mar)	SS22	11:06	Guanajuato Power Stage	8.28 km	(Finland) Mikko Hirvonen	4:40.4	106.31 km/h	(France) Sébastien Loeb

=== Power Stage ===
The "Power stage" was a live, televised 8.28 km (5.14 mi) stage at the end of the rally, held near Guanajuato.

Pos	Driver	Time	Diff.	Avg. speed	Points
1	(Finland) Mikko Hirvonen	4:40.4	0.0	106.31 km/h	3
2	(France) Sébastien Loeb	4:42.5	+2.1	105.52 km/h	2
3	(Norway) Petter Solberg	4:42.5	+2.1	105.52 km/h	1

=== Standings after the rally ===
Drivers' Championship standings

Pos.	Driver	Points
1	(Finland) Mikko Hirvonen	46
2	(France) Sébastien Loeb	37
3	(Finland) Jari-Matti Latvala	31
4	(Norway) Mads Ostberg	28
5	(Norway) Petter Solberg	23
6	(France) Sebastien Ogier	15
7	(Norway) Henning Solberg	8
8	(Sweden) Per-Gunnar Andersson	6
9	(Czech Republic) Martin Prokop	6
10	(Finland) Kimi Räikkönen	4

Manufacturers' Championship standings

Pos.	Manufacturer	Points
1	(United Kingdom) BP Ford WRT	73
2	(France) Citroen WRT	47
3	(United Kingdom) Stobart Ford	36
4	(Norway) Petter Solberg WRT	12
5	(Finland) Ice 1 Racing	8
6	(United Arab Emirates) Team Abu Dhabi	6
7	(United States) Monster WRT	6
8	(Argentina) Munchi's Ford WRT	6
9	(Netherlands) FERM Power Tools WRT	4
