= 2011 Rally de Portugal =

2011 Rally de Portugal Vodafone Rally de Portugal
Round 3 of the 2011 World Rally Championship
← Previous event	Next event →
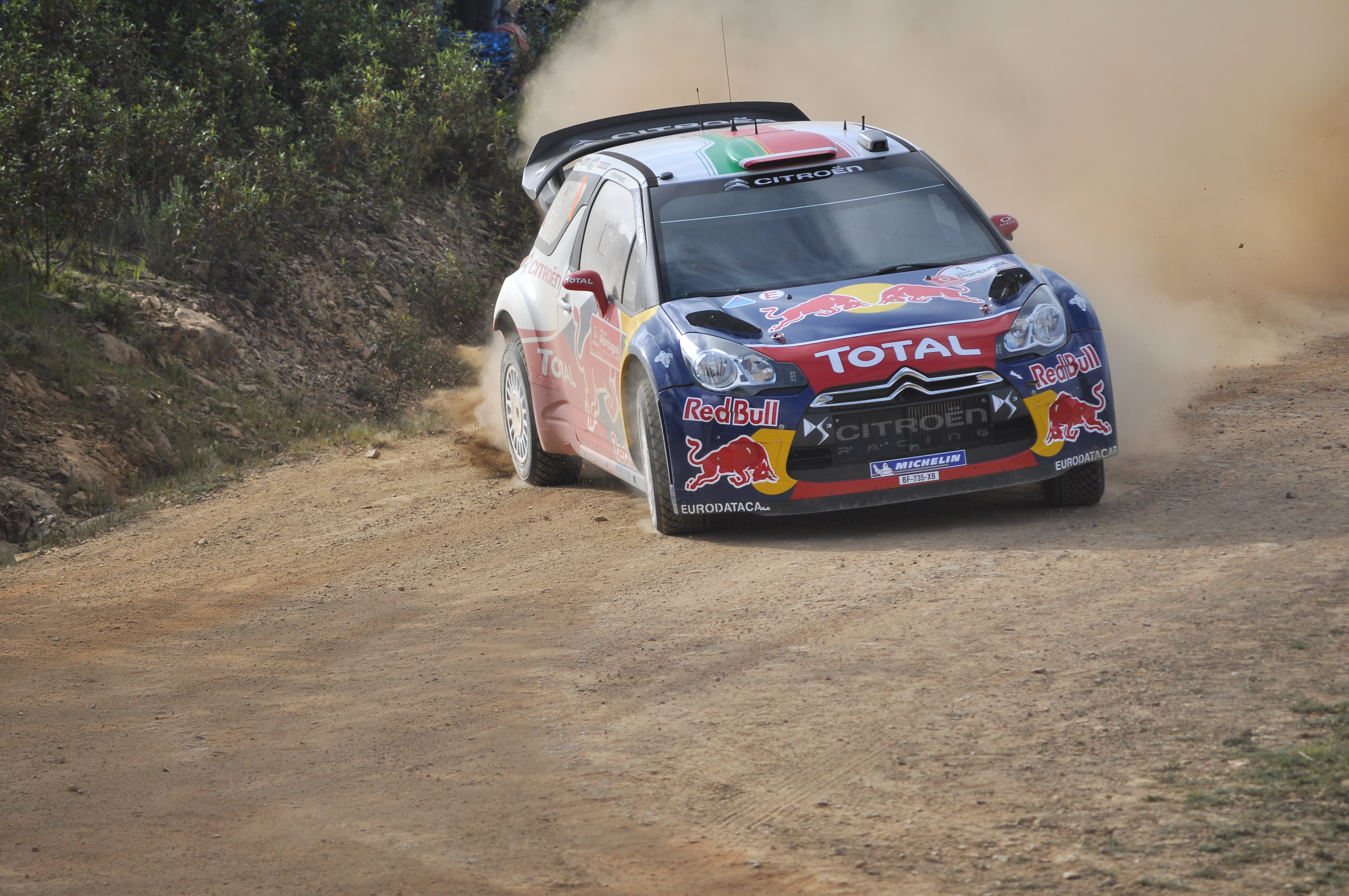
- Sébastien Loeb driving a Citroën DS3 WRC
- Host country: Portugal
- Rally base: Faro, Portugal
- Dates run: March 24 – 27 2011
- Stages: 17 (385.37 km; 239.46 miles)
- Stage surface: Gravel
- Overall distance: 1,359.71 km (844.88 miles)

Statistics
- Crews: 70 at start, 38 at finish

Overall results
- Overall winner: (France) Sébastien Ogier (France) Citroën World Rally Team

The 2011 Rally de Portugal was the third round of the 2011 World Rally Championship season. It was the season's first European event held on gravel roads. The rally took place over 24–27 March, beginning with a super special stage in the city of Lisbon. The rally was also the second round of the Production World Rally Championship and the inaugural event of the WRC Academy.

Sébastien Ogier won the event for the second consecutive year, to take his third WRC victory. Ogier had taken the lead midway through the second leg of the rally and held on to his lead to win by 31.8 seconds from teammate Sébastien Loeb, with Ford's Jari-Matti Latvala rounding out the podium in third place. Championship leader Mikko Hirvonen ended the rally in fourth place, which coupled with power stage points for Loeb, created a tie between the two at the head of the drivers' championship.

In the support classes, Hayden Paddon won the PWRC class by a comfortable margin of over seven minutes, while Egon Kaur won the inaugural WRC Academy event by a more marginal sixteen seconds.

== Results ==
=== Event standings ===
Pos.	Driver	Co-driver	Car	Time	Difference	Points
Overall
1.	(France) Sébastien Ogier	(France) Julien Ingrassia	Citroën DS3 WRC	4:10:53.4	0.0	26
2.	(France) Sébastien Loeb	(Monaco) Daniel Elena	Citroën DS3 WRC	4:11:25.2	31.8	21
3.	(Finland) Jari-Matti Latvala	(Finland) Miikka Anttila	Ford Fiesta RS WRC	4:14:15.5	3:22.1	17
4.	(Finland) Mikko Hirvonen	(Finland) Jarmo Lehtinen	Ford Fiesta RS WRC	4:17:09.7	6:16.3	12
5.	(United Kingdom) Matthew Wilson	(United Kingdom) Scott Martin	Ford Fiesta RS WRC	4:18:41.9	7:48.5	10
6.	(Norway) Petter Solberg	(United Kingdom) Chris Patterson	Citroën DS3 WRC	4:21:10.8	10:17.4	8
7.	(Finland) Kimi Räikkönen	(Finland) Kaj Lindström	Citroën DS3 WRC	4:21:47.5	10:54.1	6
8.	(Argentina) Federico Villagra	(Argentina) Jorge Pérez Companc	Ford Fiesta RS WRC	4:22:32.2	11:38.8	4
9.	(Norway) Henning Solberg	(Austria) Ilka Minor	Ford Fiesta RS WRC	4:25:09.8	14:16.4	2
10.	(Netherlands) Dennis Kuipers	(Belgium) Frédéric Miclotte	Ford Fiesta RS WRC	4:28:48.0	17:54.6	1
PWRC
1. (11.)	(New Zealand) Hayden Paddon	(New Zealand) John Kennard	Subaru Impreza WRX STI	4:33:33.4	0.0	25
2. (15.)	(Finland) Jukka Ketomäki	(Finland) Kai Risberg	Mitsubishi Lancer Evo X	4:41:13.3	7:39.9	18
3. (16.)	(Czech Republic) Martin Semerád	(Czech Republic) Michal Ernst	Mitsubishi Lancer Evo IX	4:42:46.0	9:12.6	15
4. (18.)	(Mexico) Benito Guerra	(Spain) Borja Rozada	Mitsubishi Lancer Evo X	4:47:12.7	13:39.3	12
5. (19.)	(Ukraine) Valeriy Gorban	(Estonia) Sergey Larens	Mitsubishi Lancer Evo IX	4:47:16.7	13:43.3	10
6. (20.)	(Ukraine) Oleksandr Saliuk, Jr.	(Ukraine) Pavlo Cherepin	Mitsubishi Lancer Evo IX	4:48:10.9	14:37.5	8
7. (24.)	(Poland) Michał Kościuszko	(Poland) Maciek Szczepaniak	Mitsubishi Lancer Evo X	4:53:02.0	19:28.6	6
8. (26.)	(United Arab Emirates) Majed Al Shamsi	(United Arab Emirates) Khaled Al Kendi	Subaru Impreza WRX STI	4:54:17.3	20:43.9	4
9. (28.)	(United Arab Emirates) Bader Al Jabri	(Republic of Ireland) Stephen McAuley	Subaru Impreza WRX STI	5:01:58.7	28:25.3	2
10. (29.)	(Sweden) Patrik Flodin	(Sweden) Göran Bergsten	Subaru Impreza WRX STI	5:02:57.1	29:23.7	1
WRC Academy
1.	(Estonia) Egon Kaur	(Estonia) Mait Laidvee	Ford Fiesta R2	3:30:13.8^{†}	0.0	28
2.	(Sweden) Victor Henriksson	(Sweden) Joel Ardell	Ford Fiesta R2	3:30:30.2	16.4	19
3.	(Germany) Christian Riedemann	(Germany) Michael Wenzel	Ford Fiesta R2	3:33:45.0	3:31.2	15
4.	(Australia) Brendan Reeves	(Australia) Rhianon Smyth	Ford Fiesta R2	3:34:57.2	4:43.4	12
5.	(United Kingdom) Alastair Fisher	(United Kingdom) Daniel Barritt	Ford Fiesta R2	3:36:09.4	5:55.6	12
6.	(Argentina) Miguel Baldoni	(Argentina) Fernando Mussano	Ford Fiesta R2	3:36:55.2	6:41.4	8
7.	(Italy) Andrea Crugnola	(Italy) Roberto Mometti	Ford Fiesta R2	3:42:39.8	12:26.0	6
8.	(Australia) Molly Taylor	(Australia) Rebecca Smart	Ford Fiesta R2	3:43:05.7	12:51.9	4
9.	(Italy) Matteo Brunello	(Italy) Michele Ferrara	Ford Fiesta R2	3:51:43.2	21:29.4	2
10.	(Netherlands) Timo van den Marel	(Netherlands) Erwin Berkhof	Ford Fiesta R2	4:11:05.6	40:51.8	1

† – The WRC Academy features only the first two legs of the rally.

=== Special stages ===
Day	Stage	Time	Name	Length	Winner	Time	Avg. spd.	Rally leader
Leg 1 (24–25 Mar)	SS1	15:30	SSS Lisboa	3.27 km	(Finland) Mikko Hirvonen	2:49.6	69.41 km/h	(Finland) Mikko Hirvonen
Leg 1 (24–25 Mar)	SS2	09:05	Santa Clara 1	22.99 km	(Norway) Petter Solberg	14:03.5	98.12 km/h	(Finland) Mikko Hirvonen
Leg 1 (24–25 Mar)	SS3	09:53	Ourique 1	20.27 km	(France) Sébastien Loeb (France) Sébastien Ogier	12:53.9	94.29 km/h	(Finland) Mikko Hirvonen
Leg 1 (24–25 Mar)	SS4	11:06	Felizes 1	21.31 km	(France) Sébastien Ogier	13:25.4	95.25 km/h	(France) Sébastien Ogier
Leg 1 (24–25 Mar)	SS5	14:25	Santa Clara 2	22.99 km	(France) Sébastien Ogier (Finland) Jari-Matti Latvala	13:50.9	99.61 km/h	(France) Sébastien Ogier
Leg 1 (24–25 Mar)	SS6	15:13	Ourique 2	20.27 km	(Finland) Jari-Matti Latvala	12:45.2	95.36 km/h	(France) Sébastien Ogier
Leg 1 (24–25 Mar)	SS7	16:26	Felizes 2	21.31 km	(Finland) Jari-Matti Latvala	13:27.1	95.05 km/h	(Finland) Jari-Matti Latvala
Leg 2 (26 Mar)	SS8	10:17	Almodovar 1	26.23 km	(France) Sébastien Loeb	16:12.8	97.07 km/h	(Finland) Jari-Matti Latvala
Leg 2 (26 Mar)	SS9	11:10	Vascão 1	25.26 km	(Norway) Petter Solberg	16:25.9	92.24 km/h	(Finland) Jari-Matti Latvala
Leg 2 (26 Mar)	SS10	12:00	Loulé 1	22.56 km	(France) Sébastien Ogier	15:31.6	87.18 km/h	(France) Sébastien Ogier
Leg 2 (26 Mar)	SS11	15:02	Almodovar 2	26.23 km	(France) Sébastien Ogier	15:59.6	98.40 km/h	(France) Sébastien Ogier
Leg 2 (26 Mar)	SS12	15:55	Vascão 2	25.26 km	(Norway) Petter Solberg	16:11.2	93.63 km/h	(France) Sébastien Ogier
Leg 2 (26 Mar)	SS13	16:45	Loulé 2	22.56 km	(Norway) Petter Solberg	15:13.6	88.90 km/h	(France) Sébastien Ogier
Leg 3 (27 Mar)	SS14	07:34	Silves 1	21.39 km	(Finland) Mikko Hirvonen	12:13.1	105.04 km/h	(France) Sébastien Ogier
Leg 3 (27 Mar)	SS15	08:27	Santana da Serra 1	31.04 km	(Norway) Petter Solberg	22:52.2	81.43 km/h	(France) Sébastien Ogier
Leg 3 (27 Mar)	SS16	11:55	Silves 2	21.39 km	(Norway) Petter Solberg	12:12.5	105.12 km/h	(France) Sébastien Ogier
Leg 3 (27 Mar)	SS17	16:11	Santana da Serra 2 (Power stage)	31.04 km	(France) Sébastien Loeb	22:35.9	82.41 km/h	(France) Sébastien Ogier

=== Power Stage ===
The "Power stage" was a live, televised 31.04 km (19.29 mi) stage at the end of the rally, held near São Marcos da Serra.

Pos	Driver	Time	Diff.	Avg. speed	Points
1	(France) Sébastien Loeb	22:35.9	0.0	82.41 km/h	3
2	(Finland) Jari-Matti Latvala	22:37.6	+1.7	82.31 km/h	2
3	(France) Sébastien Ogier	22:40.0	+4.1	82.16 km/h	1
