= M-Sport World Rally Team results =

The table below shows all results of M-Sport World Rally Team in World Rally Championship.

== WRC results ==
Year	Entrant	Car	No	Driver	1	2	3	4	5	6	7	8	9	10	11	12	13	14	15	16	WDC	Points	WMC	Points
2006	Stobart VK Ford Rally Team	Ford Focus RS WRC 04	9	(United Kingdom) Matthew Wilson	MON; 15	SWE; 14	MEX; 16	ESP; 15	FRA; 16	ARG; 8	ITA; 34	GRE; 10	GER; 12	FIN; 10		CYP; 10	TUR; 12				28th	1	5th	44
2006	Stobart VK Ford Rally Team	Ford Focus RS WRC 06	9	(United Kingdom) Matthew Wilson											JPN; 40			AUS; 27	NZL; 13	GBR; 12	28th	1	5th	44
2006	Stobart VK Ford Rally Team	Ford Focus RS WRC 04	10	(Belgium) Pieter Tsjoen	MON; 14																–	0	5th	44
2006	Stobart VK Ford Rally Team	Ford Focus RS WRC 04	10	(Finland) Kosti Katajamäki		SWE; 6					ITA; Ret	GRE; 26		FIN; 14			TUR; 5			GBR	14th	7	5th	44
2006	Stobart VK Ford Rally Team	Ford Focus RS WRC 04	10	(Argentina) Luís Pérez Companc			MEX; 12			ARG; 9						CYP; 14					26th	2	5th	44
2006	Stobart VK Ford Rally Team	Ford Focus RS WRC 06	10	(Argentina) Luís Pérez Companc											JPN; 11			AUS; 22	NZL; 7		26th	2	5th	44
2006	Stobart VK Ford Rally Team	Ford Focus RS WRC 04	10	(Finland) Jari-Matti Latvala				ESP; 16	FRA; Ret				GER; 34								13th	9	5th	44
2006	Stobart VK Ford Rally Team	Ford Focus RS WRC 06	10	(Finland) Jari-Matti Latvala																GBR; 4	13th	9	5th	44
2006	Stobart VK Ford Rally Team	Ford Focus RS WRC 04	17	(Argentina) Juan Pablo Raies	MON	SWE	MEX	ESP	FRA	ARG	ITA	GRE	DEU	FIN	JPN	CYP; Ret	TUR	AUS	NZL	GBR	–	0	–	–
2006	Stobart VK Ford Rally Team	Ford Focus RS WRC 04	19	(Norway) Andreas Mikkelsen	MON	SWE	MEX	ESP	FRA	ARG	ITA	GRE	DEU	FIN	JPN	CYP	TUR	AUS	NZL	GBR; Ret	–	0	–	–
2006	Stobart VK Ford Rally Team	Ford Focus RS WRC 04	23	(Argentina) Luís Pérez Companc	MON	SWE; 23		ESP	FRA		ITA; 12	GRE	DEU	FIN			TUR			GBR	27th	2	–	–
2007	Stobart VK Ford Rally Team	Ford Focus RS WRC 06	9	(Finland) Jari-Matti Latvala	MON; Ret	SWE; Ret	NOR; 5	MEX; 7	POR; 8	ARG; 4	ITA; 9	GRE; 12	FIN; Ret	GER; 8	NZL; 5	ESP; 7	FRA; 4	JPN; 25	IRE; 3	GBR; 10	8th	30	4th	81
2007	Stobart VK Ford Rally Team	Ford Focus RS WRC 06	10	(Norway) Henning Solberg	MON; 14	SWE; 4	NOR; 3	MEX; 9	POR; 11	ARG; 5	ITA; 4	GRE; 5	FIN; 5	GER; 13	NZL; 9	ESP; 10	FRA; 9	JPN; 3	IRE; 16	GBR; 15	6th	34	4th	81
2007	Stobart VK Ford Rally Team	Ford Focus RS WRC 06	16	(United Kingdom) Matthew Wilson	MON; 12	SWE; Ret	NOR; 26	MEX; 8	POR; 12	ARG; 30	ITA; 12	GRE; 10	FIN; 10	GER; 9	NZL; 10	ESP; 11	FRA; Ret	JPN; 4	IRE; 7	GBR; 6	11th	11	4th	81
2007	Stobart VK Ford Rally Team	Ford Focus RS WRC 06	18	(Italy) Alessandro Bettega	MON	SWE	NOR	MEX	POR	ARG	ITA	GRE	FIN	GER	NZL	ESP	FRA; 11	JPN	IRE	GBR	–	0	4th	81
2007	Stobart VK Ford Rally Team	Ford Focus RS WRC 04	22	(United Kingdom) Gareth Jones	MON	SWE	NOR	MEX	POR	ARG	ITA	GRE	FIN; Ret	GER	NZL						–	0	4th	81
2007	Stobart VK Ford Rally Team	Ford Focus RS WRC 05	22	(United Kingdom) Gareth Jones												ESP; Ret	FRA	JPN	IRE; Ret	GBR; Ret	–	0	4th	81
2007	Stobart VK Ford Rally Team	Ford Focus RS WRC 05	27	(Norway) Andreas Mikkelsen	MON	SWE	NOR; 10	MEX													–	0	4th	81
2007	Stobart VK Ford Rally Team	Ford Focus RS WRC 04	27	(Norway) Andreas Mikkelsen					POR; 10	ARG	ITA	GRE	FIN	GER	NZL	ESP	FRA	JPN	IRE	GBR	–	0	4th	81
2007	Stobart VK Ford Rally Team	Ford Focus RS WRC 04	29	(Republic of Ireland) Ray Breen	MON	SWE	NOR	MEX	POR	ARG	ITA	GRE	FIN	GER	NZL	ESP	FRA	JPN	IRE; Ret	GBR	–	0	4th	81
2007	Stobart VK Ford Rally Team	Subaru Impreza WRC 06	23	(Republic of Ireland) Eamonn Boland	MON	SWE	NOR	MEX	POR	ARG	ITA	GRE	FIN	GER	NZL	ESP	FRA	JPN	IRE; 31	GBR	–	0	4th	81
2008	Stobart VK Ford Rally Team	Ford Focus RS WRC 07	7	(Italy) Gianluigi Galli	MON; 6	SWE; 3	MEX; Ret	ARG; 7	JOR; 8	ITA; 4	GRE; Ret	TUR; Ret	FIN; Ret	GER; Ret							9th	17	4th	67
2008	Stobart VK Ford Rally Team	Ford Focus RS WRC 07	7	(Belgium) François Duval											NZL; Ret			JPN; Ret	GBR; 6		7th	25	4th	67
2008	Stobart VK Ford Rally Team	Ford Focus RS WRC 07	7	(United Kingdom) Matthew Wilson												ESP; 9	FRA; 8				10th	15	4th	67
2008	Stobart VK Ford Rally Team	Ford Focus RS WRC 07	8	(Belgium) François Duval	MON; 4									GER; 3							7th	25	4th	67
2008	Stobart VK Ford Rally Team	Ford Focus RS WRC 07	8	(Norway) Henning Solberg		SWE; 13		ARG; Ret	JOR; 4		GRE; 8	TUR; 5	FIN; 5								8th	22	4th	67
2008	Stobart VK Ford Rally Team	Ford Focus RS WRC 07	8	(United Kingdom) Matthew Wilson			MEX; 6			ITA; 12					NZL; 17			JPN; 7	GBR; 9		10th	15	4th	67
2008	Stobart VK Ford Rally Team	Ford Focus RS WRC 07	8	(Finland) Jari-Matti Latvala												ESP; 6	FRA; 4				4th	58	4th	67
2008	Stobart VK Ford Rally Team	Ford Focus RS WRC 07	14	(Norway) Henning Solberg	MON; 9		MEX			ITA				GER; 7	NZL	ESP	FRA; 15	JPN	GBR; Ret		8th	22	4th	67
2008	Stobart VK Ford Rally Team	Ford Focus RS WRC 07	16	(United Kingdom) Matthew Wilson	MON; 10	SWE		ARG; Ret	JOR; 5		GRE; 6	TUR; 7	FIN; 9	GER; 12							10th	15	4th	67
2008	Stobart VK Ford Rally Team	Ford Focus RS WRC 07	20	(United Kingdom) Barry Clark	MON	SWE	MEX	ARG	JOR	ITA	GRE	TUR	FIN	GER	NZL	ESP	FRA; 10	JPN	GBR; 10		–	0	4th	67
2008	Stobart VK Ford Rally Team	Ford Focus RS WRC 07	46	(Italy) Valentino Rossi	MON	SWE	MEX	ARG	JOR	ITA	GRE	TUR	FIN	GER	NZL	ESP	FRA	JPN	GBR; 12		–	0	4th	67
2008	Stobart VK Ford Rally Team	Ford Focus RS WRC 04	23	(United Kingdom) Steve Perez	MON	SWE	MEX	ARG	JOR	ITA	GRE	TUR	FIN	GER	NZL	ESP	FRA	JPN	GBR; 19		–	0	4th	67
2008	Stobart VK Ford Rally Team	Ford Focus RS WRC 05	24	(United Kingdom) Dave Weston, Jr	MON	SWE	MEX	ARG	JOR	ITA	GRE	TUR	FIN	GER	NZL	ESP	FRA	JPN	GBR; 33		–	0	4th	67
2009	Stobart VK Ford Rally Team	Ford Focus RS WRC 08	5	(Estonia) Urmo Aava	IRE; 10	NOR; 8															19th	1	3rd	80
2009	Stobart VK Ford Rally Team	Ford Focus RS WRC 08	5	(United Kingdom) Matthew Wilson			CYP; 5	POR; Ret	ARG; 5	ITA; 6	GRE; 13	POL; 5	FIN; 8	AUS; 6	ESP; 7	GBR; 6					7th	28	3rd	80
2009	Stobart VK Ford Rally Team	Ford Focus RS WRC 08	6	(Norway) Henning Solberg	IRE; 4	NOR; 4	CYP; 18	POR; 5	ARG; 3	ITA; 8	GRE; 14	POL; 3	FIN; 30	AUS; 7	ESP; 9	GBR; 5					6th	33	3rd	80
2009	Stobart VK Ford Rally Team	Ford Focus RS WRC 08	15	(Poland) Krzysztof Holowczyc	IRE	NOR	CYP	POR	ARG	ITA	GRE	POL; 6	FIN	AUS	ESP	GBR					16th	3	3rd	80
2009	Stobart VK Ford Rally Team	Ford Focus RS WRC 08	16	(United Kingdom) Matthew Wilson	IRE; 7	NOR; 7															7th	28	3rd	80
2009	Stobart VK Ford Rally Team	Ford Focus RS WRC 07	17	(United Kingdom) Steve Perez	IRE	NOR	CYP	POR	ARG	ITA	GRE	POL	FIN	AUS	ESP	GBR; 11					–	0	3rd	80
2010	Stobart M-Sport Ford Rally Team	Ford Focus RS WRC 08	5	(Finland) Marcus Grönholm	SWE; 21																–	0	4th	176
2010	Stobart M-Sport Ford Rally Team	Ford Focus RS WRC 08	5	(United Kingdom) Matthew Wilson		MEX; 16	JOR; 5	TUR; 7	NZL; 6	POR; 6	BUL; 9	FIN; 6	GER; 6	JPN; 22	FRA; 8	ESP; 6	GBR; 7				7th	74	4th	176
2010	Stobart M-Sport Ford Rally Team	Ford Focus RS WRC 08	6	(Norway) Henning Solberg	SWE; 6	MEX; 6	JOR; 9	TUR; 25	NZL; 7	POR; Ret		FIN; Ret		JPN; 7			GBR; 6				8th	45	4th	176
2010	Stobart M-Sport Ford Rally Team	Ford Focus RS WRC 08	6	(Sweden) Per-Gunnar Andersson							BUL; 7										13th	8	4th	176
2010	Stobart M-Sport Ford Rally Team	Ford Focus RS WRC 08	6	(Belgium) François Duval									GER; Ret								–	0	4th	176
2010	Stobart M-Sport Ford Rally Team	Ford Focus RS WRC 08	12	(United Kingdom) Matthew Wilson	SWE; 7																7th	74	4th	176
2010	Stobart M-Sport Ford Rally Team	Ford Focus RS WRC 08	12	(Finland) Juha Kankkunen		MEX	JOR	TUR	NZL	POR	BUL	FIN; 8	GER	JPN	FRA	ESP	GBR				16th	4	4th	176
2010	Stobart M-Sport Ford Rally Team	Ford Focus RS WRC 08	15	(China) Liu Chao Dong	SWE	MEX	JOR	TUR	NZL	POR	BUL	FIN	DEU	JPN	FRA	ESP	GBR; Ret				–	0	4th	176
2010	Stobart M-Sport Ford Rally Team	Ford Focus RS WRC 08	17	(Finland) Mattias Therman	SWE; 24	MEX	JOR	TUR	NZL	POR	BUL	FIN; 14	DEU	JPN	FRA	ESP	GBR				–	0	4th	176
2010	Stobart M-Sport Ford Rally Team	Ford Focus RS WRC 08	43	(United States) Ken Block	SWE	MEX	JOR	TUR	NZL	POR	BUL	FIN	DEU	JPN	FRA; 12	ESP; 9	GBR				19th	2	4th	176
2010	Stobart M-Sport Ford Rally Team	Ford Fiesta S2000	12	(Norway) Henning Solberg							BUL; 10				FRA; 9	ESP; 8					8th	45	4th	176
2010	Stobart M-Sport Ford Rally Team	Ford Fiesta S2000	18	(Norway) Mads Østberg	SWE	MEX	JOR	TUR	NZL	POR	BUL	FIN	DEU; 16	JPN	FRA; 41	ESP	GBR				11th	18	4th	176
2010	Stobart M-Sport Ford Rally Team	Ford Fiesta S2000	61	(Netherlands) Dennis Kuipers	SWE	MEX	JOR	TUR; 9	NZL	POR; 19	BUL; 13	FIN; Ret	GER; 24	JPN	FRA; 17	ESP; 11	GBR; 16				19th	2	4th	176
2011	M-Sport Stobart Ford World Rally Team	Ford Fiesta RS WRC	5	(Norway) Henning Solberg	SWE; Ret	MEX; 6	POR; 9	JOR; 14													9th	59	3rd	178
2011	M-Sport Stobart Ford World Rally Team	Ford Fiesta RS WRC	5	(United Kingdom) Matthew Wilson					ITA; 9	ARG; 8	GRE; 6	FIN; 8	GER; 11	AUS; 4	FRA; 10	ESP; Ret	GBR; 5				7th	63	3rd	178
2011	M-Sport Stobart Ford World Rally Team	Ford Fiesta RS WRC	6	(Norway) Mads Østberg	SWE; 2	MEX; 5	POR; 31	JOR; 13	ITA; 5	ARG; 5	GRE; 12	FIN; 6	GER; Ret		FRA; 7	ESP; 6	GBR; 2				6th	88	3rd	178
2011	M-Sport Stobart Ford World Rally Team	Ford Fiesta RS WRC	6	(Russia) Evgeny Novikov										AUS; Ret							17th	12	3rd	178
2011	M-Sport Stobart Ford World Rally Team	Ford Fiesta RS WRC	15	(United Kingdom) Matthew Wilson	SWE; 9	MEX; Ret	POR; 5	JOR; 5													7th	63	3rd	178
2011	M-Sport Stobart Ford World Rally Team	Ford Fiesta RS WRC	15	(Norway) Henning Solberg					ITA; Ret	ARG; DNS	GRE; 5	FIN; 7	GER; 7	AUS; 14	FRA; 6	ESP; 8	GBR; 3				9th	59	3rd	178
2011	M-Sport Stobart Ford World Rally Team	Ford Fiesta RS WRC	16	(Sweden) Per-Gunnar Andersson	SWE	MEX	POR	JOR	ITA; 15	ARG	GRE	FIN								¨	20th	6	3rd	178
2011	M-Sport Stobart Ford World Rally Team	Ford Fiesta RS WRC	16	(Germany) Aaron Burkart									GER; 23	AUS	FRA	ESP	GBR			¨	–	0	3rd	178
2011	M-Sport Stobart Ford World Rally Team	Ford Fiesta RS WRC	18	(Estonia) Ott Tänak	SWE	MEX	POR	JOR	ITA	ARG	GRE	FIN	GER	AUS	FRA	ESP	GBR; 6			¨	15th	15	3rd	178
2011	M-Sport Stobart Ford World Rally Team	Ford Fiesta RS WRC	54	(Russia) Evgeny Novikov	SWE	MEX; Ret	POR	JOR	ITA; 14	ARG	GRE; 20	FIN; Ret	GER		FRA; 24	ESP	GBR				17th	12	3rd	178
2012	M-Sport Ford World Rally Team	Ford Fiesta RS WRC	5	(Estonia) Ott Tänak	MON; 8	SWE; Ret	MEX; 5	POR; 14	ARG; 10	GRE; 9	NZL; Ret	FIN; 6	GER; Ret	GBR; Ret	FRA; 6	ITA; 3	ESP; Ret				8th	52	3rd	170
2012	M-Sport Ford World Rally Team	Ford Fiesta RS WRC	6	(Russia) Evgeny Novikov	MON; 5	SWE; 5	MEX; Ret	POR; 2	ARG; 8	GRE; Ret	NZL; 4	FIN; 36	GER; Ret	GBR; 6	FRA; 7	ITA; 2					6th	88	3rd	170
2012	M-Sport Ford World Rally Team	Ford Fiesta RS WRC	6	(Trinidad and Tobago) John Powell													ESP; Ret				–	0	3rd	170
2012	M-Sport Ford World Rally Team	Ford Fiesta RS WRC	8	(France) François Delecour	MON; 6																18th	8	3rd	170
2012	M-Sport Ford World Rally Team	Ford Fiesta RS WRC	8	(Poland) Michał Sołowow		SWE; 20	MEX	POR	ARG	GRE	NZL	FIN	GER	GBR	FRA	ITA	ESP				–	0	3rd	170
2012	M-Sport Ford World Rally Team	Ford Fiesta RS WRC	15	(United Kingdom) Matthew Wilson	MON	SWE	MEX	POR	ARG	GRE	NZL	FIN	GER	GBR; 6	FRA	ITA	ESP				24th	4	3rd	170
2012	M-Sport Ford World Rally Team	Ford Fiesta RS WRC	16	(South Africa) Jan Habig	MON	SWE	MEX	POR	ARG	GRE	NZL	FIN	GER	GBR; 28	FRA	ITA	ESP				–	0	3rd	170
2012	M-Sport Ford World Rally Team	Ford Fiesta RS WRC	18	(Netherlands) Dennis Kuipers	MON	SWE	MEX	POR; 6	ARG	GRE	NZL	FIN	GER	GBR	FRA	ITA	ESP				17th	8	3rd	170
2013	Qatar M-Sport World Rally Team	Ford Fiesta RS WRC	4	(Norway) Mads Østberg	MON; 6	SWE; 3	MEX; 11	POR; 8	ARG; 7	GRE; 6	ITA; 8	FIN; 3	GER; 9	AUS; 5	FRA; 8	ESP; 6	GBR; 4				6th	102	3rd	190
2013	Qatar M-Sport World Rally Team	Ford Fiesta RS WRC	5	(Russia) Evgeny Novikov	MON; Ret	SWE; 9	MEX; 10	POR; 4	ARG; 4	GRE; 9	ITA; Ret	FIN; 6	GER; 10	AUS; 7	FRA; 5	ESP; 5	GBR; 19				7th	69	3rd	190
2013	Qatar M-Sport World Rally Team	Ford Fiesta RS WRC	22	(New Zealand) Hayden Paddon												ESP; 8					18th	8	–	–
2013	Qatar M-Sport World Rally Team	Ford Fiesta RS WRC	22	(Poland) Michał Sołowow													GBR; 14				–	0	–	–
2014	M-Sport World Rally Team	Ford Fiesta RS WRC	5	(Finland) Mikko Hirvonen	MON; Ret	SWE; 4	MEX; 8	POR; 2	ARG; 9	ITA; Ret	POL; 4	FIN; 5	GER; 5	AUS; 5	FRA; 5	ESP; 3	GBR; 2				4th	126	3rd	208
2014	M-Sport World Rally Team	Ford Fiesta RS WRC	6	(United Kingdom) Elfyn Evans	MON; 6	SWE; Ret	MEX; 4	POR; 22	ARG; 7	ITA; 5	POL; 35	FIN; 7	GER; 4	AUS; 8	FRA; 6	ESP; 14	GBR; 5				8th	81	3rd	208
2014	M-Sport World Rally Team	Ford Fiesta RS WRC	11	(France) Bryan Bouffier	MON; 2																6th	18	–	–
2014	M-Sport World Rally Team	Ford Fiesta RS WRC	11	(Estonia) Ott Tänak		SWE; 5		POR; Ret	ARG	ITA											14th	10	–	–
2014	M-Sport World Rally Team	Ford Fiesta RS WRC	11	(Mexico) Benito Guerra			MEX; 6														12th	8	–	–
2014	M-Sport World Rally Team	Ford Fiesta RS WRC	11	(Poland) Michał Sołowow							POL; Ret										–	0	–	–
2014	M-Sport World Rally Team	Ford Fiesta RS WRC	11	(Netherlands) Dennis Kuipers								FIN	GER; 8	AUS	FRA; 11	ESP	GBR				20th	4	–	–
2014	M-Sport World Rally Team	Ford Fiesta RS WRC	12	(Ukraine) Yuriy Protasov	MON	SWE	MEX	POR	ARG	ITA	POL	FIN	GER; 9	AUS							–	0	–	–
2014	M-Sport World Rally Team	Ford Fiesta RS WRC	14	(Poland) Michał Sołowow	MON	SWE; 17	MEX	POR	ARG	ITA		FIN; Ret	GER	AUS							–	0	–	–
2014	M-Sport World Rally Team	Ford Fiesta RS WRC	14	(Ukraine) Yuriy Protasov							POL				FRA; 16	ESP; 11	GBR				–	0	–	–
2014	M-Sport World Rally Team	Ford Fiesta RS WRC	15	(United States) Ken Block	MON	SWE	MEX	POR	ARG	ITA	POL	FIN	GER	AUS	FRA	ESP; 12	GBR				–	0	–	–
2014	RK M-Sport World Rally Team	Ford Fiesta RS WRC	10	(Poland) Robert Kubica	MON; Ret	SWE; 24	MEX; Ret	POR; Ret	ARG; 6	ITA; 8	POL; 20	FIN; 34	GER; Ret	AUS; 9	FRA; Ret	ESP; 17	GBR; 11				16th	14	8th	26
2015	M-Sport World Rally Team	Ford Fiesta RS WRC	5	(United Kingdom) Elfyn Evans	MON; 7	SWE; 6	MEX; 4	ARG; 3	POR; 69	ITA; 4	POL; 50	FIN; 12	GER; 9	AUS; 6	FRA; 2	ESP; 34	GBR; 6				7th	89	4th	181
2015	M-Sport World Rally Team	Ford Fiesta RS WRC	6	(Estonia) Ott Tänak	MON; 18	SWE; 4	MEX; 22	ARG; 10	POR; 5	ITA; 14	POL; 3	FIN; 5	GER; 8	AUS; 6	FRA; 10	ESP; 41	GBR; Ret				10th	63	4th	181
2015	M-Sport World Rally Team	Ford Fiesta RS WRC	15	(France) Bryan Bouffier	MON; Ret	SWE	MEX	ARG	POR	ITA	POL	FIN	GER	AUS	FRA; 8	ESP	GBR				23rd	4	–	0
2015	M-Sport World Rally Team	Ford Fiesta RS WRC	17	(Ukraine) Yuriy Protasov	MON	SWE; 9	MEX	ARG	POR	ITA	POL	FIN	GER	AUS	FRA	ESP	GBR				15th	8	–	0
2016	M-Sport World Rally Team	Ford Fiesta RS WRC	5	(Norway) Mads Østberg	MON; 4	SWE; 3	MEX; 3	ARG; 5	POR; 7	ITA; Ret	POL; 8	FIN; 6	GER; 6	CHN; C	FRA; 9	ESP; 5	GBR; 8	AUS; 6			7th	102	4th	162
2016	M-Sport World Rally Team	Ford Fiesta RS WRC	6	(France) Eric Camilli	MON; Ret	SWE; Ret	MEX; 16	ARG; 8	POR; 5	ITA; 6	POL; 10	FIN; Ret	GER; 50	CHN; C	FRA; 8	ESP; 19	GBR; 10	AUS; Ret			11th	28	4th	162
2016	M-Sport World Rally Team	Ford Fiesta RS WRC	17	(France) Bryan Bouffier	MON; Ret	SWE	MEX	ARG	POR	ITA	POL	FIN	GER	CHN; C	FRA	ESP	GBR	AUS			–	0	–	0
2017	M-Sport World Rally Team	Ford Fiesta WRC	1	(France) Sébastien Ogier	MON; 1	SWE; 3	MEX; 2	FRA; 2	ARG; 4	POR; 1	ITA; 5	POL; 3	FIN; Ret	GER; 3	ESP; 2	GBR; 3	AUS; 4				1st	232	1st	428
2017	M-Sport World Rally Team	Ford Fiesta WRC	2	(Estonia) Ott Tänak	MON; 3	SWE; 2	MEX; 4	FRA; 11	ARG; 3	POR; 4	ITA; 1	POL; Ret	FIN; 7	GER; 1	ESP; 3	GBR; 6	AUS; 2				3rd	191	1st	428
2017	M-Sport World Rally Team	Ford Fiesta WRC	3	(United Kingdom) Elfyn Evans	MON; 6	SWE; 6	MEX; 9	FRA; 21	ARG; 2	POR; 6	ITA; Ret	POL; 8	FIN; 2	GER; 6	ESP; 7	GBR; 1	AUS; 5				5th	128	1st	428
2017	M-Sport World Rally Team	Ford Fiesta WRC	14	(Germany) Armin Kremer	MON	SWE	MEX	FRA	ARG	POR	ITA	POL	FIN	GER; 9	ESP	GBR	AUS				22nd	2	–	–
2017	M-Sport World Rally Team	Ford Fiesta WRC	15	(Finland) Teemu Suninen	MON	SWE	MEX	FRA	ARG	POR	ITA	POL; 6	FIN; 4	GER	ESP	GBR	AUS				14th	29	–	–
2017	Onebet Jipocar World Rally Team (Note: Under rules introduced for the 2017 season, only manufacturers are permitted to enter 2017-specification cars. As such, the Jipocar, and FWRT entries will officially be a part of M-Sport, but will be treated as a separate entity by the team.)	Ford Fiesta WRC	14	(Norway) Mads Østberg	MON	SWE; 15	MEX	FRA	ARG; 9	POR; 8	ITA; 7	POL; 7	FIN; 10	GER	ESP; 5	GBR; 38	AUS				15th	29	–	–
2017	FWRT	Ford Fiesta WRC	37	(Italy) Lorenzo Bertelli	MON	SWE	MEX; 16	FRA	ARG; Ret	POR	ITA	POL	FIN	GER	ESP	GBR	AUS				–	0	–	–
2018	M-Sport Ford World Rally Team	Ford Fiesta WRC	1	(France) Sébastien Ogier	MON; 1	SWE; 10	MEX; 1	FRA; 1	ARG; 4	POR; Ret	ITA; 2	FIN; 5	GER; 4	TUR; 10	GBR; 1	ESP; 2	AUS; 5				1st	219	3rd	324
2018	M-Sport Ford World Rally Team	Ford Fiesta WRC	2	(United Kingdom) Elfyn Evans	MON; 6	SWE; 14	MEX; Ret	FRA; 5	ARG; 6	POR; 2	ITA; 14	FIN; 7	GER; 25	TUR; 12	GBR; 20	ESP; 3	AUS; 6				8th	80	3rd	324
2018	M-Sport Ford World Rally Team	Ford Fiesta WRC	3	(France) Bryan Bouffier	MON; 8			FRA; Ret													19th	4	3rd	324
2018	M-Sport Ford World Rally Team	Ford Fiesta WRC	3	(Finland) Teemu Suninen		SWE; 8	MEX; 12		ARG; 9	POR; 3	ITA; 10	FIN; 6	GER; 5	TUR; 4	GBR; Ret	ESP; 11	AUS; Ret				12th	54	3rd	324
2019	M-Sport Ford WRT	Ford Fiesta WRC	3	(Finland) Teemu Suninen	MON; 11	SWE; 23	MEX; Ret	FRA; 5	ARG; 7	CHL; 5	POR; 4	ITA; 2	FIN; 8	GER; 29	TUR; 4	GBR; Ret	ESP; 7	AUS; C			9th	89	4th	218
2019	M-Sport Ford WRT	Ford Fiesta WRC	7	(Sweden) Pontus Tidemand	MON; 20	SWE; 8	MEX	FRA	ARG	CHL	POR	ITA	FIN	GER	TUR; 9	GBR; 7	ESP	AUS; C			13th	12	4th	218
2019	M-Sport Ford WRT	Ford Fiesta WRC	33	(United Kingdom) Elfyn Evans	MON; Ret	SWE; 5	MEX; 3	FRA; 3	ARG; Ret	CHL; 4	POR; 5	ITA; 4		GER	TUR; WD	GBR; 5	ESP; 6	AUS; C			5th	102	4th	218
2019	M-Sport Ford WRT	Ford Fiesta WRC	33	(United Kingdom) Gus Greensmith									FIN; Ret								15th	8	4th	218
2019	M-Sport Ford WRT	Ford Fiesta WRC	20	(New Zealand) Hayden Paddon	MON	SWE	MEX	FRA	ARG	CHL	POR	ITA	FIN; WD	GER	TUR	GBR	ESP	AUS; C			NC	0	4th	218
2019	M-Sport Ford WRT	Ford Fiesta WRC	44	(United Kingdom) Gus Greensmith	MON	SWE	MEX	FRA	ARG	CHL	POR; Ret	ITA	FIN	GER; 9	TUR	GBR	ESP	AUS; C			15th	8	4th	218
2020	M-Sport Ford WRT	Ford Fiesta WRC	3	(Finland) Teemu Suninen	MON; 8	SWE; 8	MEX; 3	EST; 6	TUR; Ret	ITA; 5	MNZ; Ret										7th	44	3rd	129
2020	M-Sport Ford WRT	Ford Fiesta WRC	4	(Finland) Esapekka Lappi	MON; 4	SWE; 5	MEX; Ret	EST; 7	TUR; 6	ITA; Ret	MNZ; 4										6th	52	3rd	129
2020	M-Sport Ford WRT	Ford Fiesta WRC	44	(United Kingdom) Gus Greensmith	MON; 63	SWE	MEX; 9	EST; 8	TUR; 5	ITA; 25	MNZ; Ret										11th	16	3rd	129
2021	M-Sport Ford WRT	Ford Fiesta WRC	3	(Finland) Teemu Suninen	MON; Ret	ARC; 8	CRO	POR	ITA; 31	KEN	EST; 6	BEL	GRE	FIN	ESP	MNZ					11th	29	3rd	199
2021	M-Sport Ford WRT	Ford Fiesta WRC	16	(France) Adrien Fourmaux	MON	ARC	CRO; 5	POR; 6	ITA	KEN; 5	EST	BEL; Ret	GRE; 7	FIN; 7	ESP; 16	MNZ; 55					10th	42	3rd	199
2021	M-Sport Ford WRT	Ford Fiesta WRC	44	(United Kingdom) Gus Greensmith	MON; 8	ARC; 9	CRO; 7	POR; 5	ITA; 26	KEN; 4	EST; 32	BEL; 47	GRE; 5	FIN; 6	ESP; 6	MNZ; 8					9th	64	3rd	199
2021	M-Sport Ford WRT	Ford Fiesta WRC	37	(Italy) Lorenzo Bertelli	MON	ARC; 51	CRO	POR	ITA	KEN; 11	EST	BEL	GRE	FIN	ESP	MNZ					NC	0	–	–
2022	M-Sport Ford WRT	Ford Puma Rally1	16	(France) Adrien Fourmaux	MON; Ret	SWE; Ret	CRO; Ret	POR; 9	ITA; Ret	KEN; 13	EST; 7	FIN; 18	BEL; Ret	GRE; WD	NZL; WD	ESP; 8	JPN; WD				16th	13	3rd	257
2022	M-Sport Ford WRT	Ford Puma Rally1	19	(France) Sébastien Loeb	MON; 1	SWE	CRO	POR; Ret	ITA	KEN; 8	EST	FIN	BEL	GRE; Ret	NZL	ESP	JPN				11th	35	3rd	257
2022	M-Sport Ford WRT	Ford Puma Rally1	42	(Republic of Ireland) Craig Breen	MON; 3	SWE; 36	CRO; 4	POR; 8	ITA; 2	KEN; 6	EST; 30	FIN; 32	BEL; 63	GRE; 5	NZL; 19	ESP; 9	JPN; 24				7th	84	3rd	257
2022	M-Sport Ford WRT	Ford Puma Rally1	44	(United Kingdom) Gus Greensmith		SWE; 5	CRO; 15		ITA; 7		EST; Ret	FIN; 7	BEL; 19	GRE; 29	NZL; Ret	ESP; Ret	JPN; 6				10th	44	3rd	257
2022	M-Sport Ford WRT	Ford Puma Rally1	44	(United Kingdom) Gus Greensmith	MON; 5			POR; 19		KEN; 14											10th	44	-	-
2022	M-Sport Ford WRT	Ford Puma Rally1	7	(France) Pierre-Louis Loubet	MON	SWE	CRO; 47	POR; 7	ITA; 4	KEN	EST; Ret	FIN; Ret	BEL	GRE; 4	NZL	ESP; 10	JPN				13th	31	-	-
2022	M-Sport Ford WRT	Ford Puma Rally1	37	(Italy) Lorenzo Bertelli	MON	SWE; WD	CRO	POR	ITA	KEN	EST	FIN	BEL	GRE	NZL; 7	ESP	JPN				25th	6	-	-
2022	M-Sport Ford WRT	Ford Puma Rally1	9	(Greece) Jourdan Serderidis	MON	SWE	CRO	POR	ITA	KEN; 7	EST	FIN	BEL	GRE; Ret	NZL	ESP; 28	JPN; WD				24th	6	-	-
2023	M-Sport Ford WRT	Ford Puma Rally1	7	(France) Pierre-Louis Loubet	MON; Ret	SWE; 6	MEX; 26	CRO; 7	POR; 32	ITA; Ret	KEN; 7	EST; 6	FIN; 5	GRE; Ret	CHI; Ret	EUR; 10	JPN				12th	29	3rd	287
2023	M-Sport Ford WRT	Ford Puma Rally1	8	(Estonia) Ott Tänak	MON; 5	SWE; 1	MEX; 9	CRO; 2	POR; 4	ITA; 36	KEN; 6	EST; 8	FIN; Ret	GRE; 4	CHI; 1	EUR; 3	JPN; 6				4th	174	3rd	287
2023	M-Sport Ford WRT	Ford Puma Rally1	9	(Greece) Jourdan Serderidis	MON; 24	SWE	MEX; 25	CRO	POR	ITA	KEN; Ret	EST	FIN	GRE	CHI	EUR	JPN				NC	0	–	–
2023	M-Sport Ford WRT	Ford Puma Rally1	13	(Luxembourg) Grégoire Munster	MON	SWE	MEX	CRO	POR	ITA	KEN	EST	FIN	GRE	CHI; 13	EUR; 7	JPN				22nd	6	–	–
2023	M-Sport Ford WRT	Ford Puma Rally1	16	(France) Adrien Fourmaux	MON	SWE	MEX	CRO	POR	ITA	KEN	EST	FIN	GRE	CHI	EUR	JPN; Ret				20th	8	–	–
2023	M-Sport Ford WRT	Ford Puma Rally1	28	(Chile) Alberto Heller	MON	SWE	MEX	CRO	POR	ITA	KEN	EST	FIN	GRE	CHI; 15	EUR	JPN				NC	0	–	–
2024	M-Sport Ford WRT	Ford Puma Rally1	16	(France) Adrien Fourmaux	MON; 5	SWE; 3	KEN; 3	CRO; 17	POR; 4	ITA; 14	POL; 3	LAT; 4	FIN; 3	GRE; 21	CHL; 5	EUR; 32	JPN; 3				5th	162	3rd	295
2024	M-Sport Ford WRT	Ford Puma Rally1	13	(Luxembourg) Grégoire Munster	MON; 20	SWE; 23	KEN; 15	CRO; 7	POR; Ret	ITA; 5	POL; 7	LAT; 9	FIN; 49	GRE; Ret	CHL; 7	EUR; 5	JPN; 5				8th	46	3rd	295
2024	M-Sport Ford WRT	Ford Puma Rally1	19	(Greece) Jourdan Serderidis	MON	SWE	KEN; 9	CRO	POR	ITA	POL	LAT	FIN	GRE; 14	CHL	EUR; 22	JPN				29th	2	–	–
2024	M-Sport Ford WRT	Ford Puma Rally1	22	(Latvia) Mārtiņš Sesks	MON	SWE	KEN	CRO	POR	ITA	POL; 5	LAT; 7	FIN	GRE	CHL; 24	EUR	JPN				15th	22	–	–
2025	M-Sport Ford WRT	Ford Puma Rally1	13	(Luxembourg) Grégoire Munster	MON; Ret	SWE; 8	KEN; 5	ESP; 11	POR; 9	ITA; 32	GRE; Ret	EST; 10	FIN; 9	PAR; 39	CHL; 8	EUR; 27	JPN; 5	SAU; 8			10th	40	3rd	205
2025	M-Sport Ford WRT	Ford Puma Rally1	55	(Republic of Ireland) Josh McErlean	MON; 7	SWE; 46	KEN; 10	ESP; Ret	POR; 8	ITA; 34	GRE; 12	EST; 9	FIN; 7	PAR; 29	CHL; 37	EUR; 7	JPN; Ret	SAU; 9			11th	28	3rd	205
2025	M-Sport Ford WRT	Ford Puma Rally1	22	(Latvia) Mārtiņš Sesks	MON	SWE; 6	KEN	ESP	POR; 15	ITA; Ret	GRE; 15	EST; 8	FIN; 8	PAR	CHL	EUR	JPN	SAU; Ret			12th	16	–	–
2025	M-Sport Ford WRT	Ford Puma Rally1	19	(Greece) Jourdan Serderidis	MON	SWE; 33	KEN; 8	ESP	POR	ITA; 25	GRE; Ret	EST	FIN	PAR	CHL	EUR	JPN	SAU			18th	4	–	–
2025	M-Sport Ford WRT	Ford Puma Rally1	2	(Portugal) Diogo Salvi	MON	SWE	KEN	ESP	POR; 31	ITA	GRE	EST	FIN	PAR	CHL	EUR	JPN	SAU			27th	0	–	–
2025	M-Sport Ford WRT	Ford Puma Rally1	28	(Chile) Alberto Heller	MON	SWE	KEN	ESP	POR	ITA	GRE	EST	FIN	PAR	CHL; 38	EUR	JPN	SAU			30th	0	–	–
2025	M-Sport Ford WRT	Ford Puma Rally1	20	(Qatar) Nasser Al-Attiyah	MON	SWE	KEN	ESP	POR	ITA	GRE	EST	FIN	PAR	CHL	EUR	JPN	SAU; 15			31st	0	–	–
2026	M-Sport Ford WRT	Ford Puma Rally1	55	(Republic of Ireland) Josh McErlean	MON; Ret	SWE; 9	KEN; Ret	CRO; 15	ESP; 8	POR; 18	JPN; 10	GRE; 4	EST; 43	FIN; 7	PAR; 6	CHL; 7	ITA; 22				9th	35	4th	168
2026	M-Sport Ford WRT	Ford Puma Rally1	95	(Republic of Ireland) Jon Armstrong	MON; Ret	SWE; 8	KEN; 15	CRO; 32	ESP; 11	POR; Ret	JPN; 8	GRE; 20	EST; 9	FIN; 46	PAR; Ret	CHL; 33	ITA; 7				12th	22	4th	168
2026	M-Sport Ford WRT	Ford Puma Rally1	13	(Luxembourg) Grégoire Munster	MON; Ret	SWE	KEN	CRO	ESP	POR	JPN	GRE	EST	FIN	PAR	CHL	ITA				NC	0	–	–
2026	M-Sport Ford WRT	Ford Puma Rally1	22	(Latvia) Mārtiņš Sesks	MON	SWE; 35	KEN	CRO	ESP	POR; 9	JPN	GRE; 8	EST; 7	FIN; 42	PAR	CHL	ITA; 18				16th	12	–	–
2026	M-Sport Ford WRT	Ford Puma Rally1	19	(Greece) Jourdan Serderidis	MON	SWE	KEN	CRO	ESP	POR	JPN	GRE; 32	EST	FIN	PAR	CHL	ITA				NC	0	–	–

* Season still in progress.

== WRC-2 results ==
Year	Entrant	Car	Driver	1	2	3	4	5	6	7	8	9	10	11	12	13	14	WRC-2	Points	Teams	Points
2013	Qatar M-Sport World Rally Team	Ford Fiesta RRC	(United Kingdom) Elfyn Evans	MON	SWE	MEX	POR; 8	ARG	GRE	ITA								7th	65	3rd	85
2013	Qatar M-Sport World Rally Team	Ford Fiesta R5	(United Kingdom) Elfyn Evans								FIN; Ret	GER; 2	AUS	FRA; 2	ESP; Ret	GBR; 1		7th	65	3rd	85
2016	M-Sport World Rally Team	Ford Fiesta R5	(United Kingdom) Elfyn Evans	MON; 1	SWE; 1	MEX	ARG; 4	POR; 14	ITA	POL; 2	FIN; 3	GER	CHN; C	FRA; 1	ESP	GBR	AUS	3rd	120	2nd	131
2016	M-Sport World Rally Team	Ford Fiesta R5	(Norway) Eyvind Brynildsen	MON	SWE; 5	MEX	ARG	POR	ITA	POL	FIN	GER	CHN; C	FRA	ESP	GBR	AUS	30th	10	2nd	131
2016	M-Sport World Rally Team	Ford Fiesta R5	(Norway) Henning Solberg	MON	SWE	MEX	ARG	POR	ITA	POL	FIN; 4	GER	CHN; C	FRA	ESP	GBR	AUS	25th	12	2nd	131
2016	M-Sport World Rally Team	Ford Fiesta R5	(United Kingdom) Rhys Yates	MON	SWE	MEX	ARG	POR	ITA	POL	FIN	GER	CHN; C	FRA	ESP	GBR; 11	AUS	–	0	2nd	131
2016	M-Sport World Rally Team	Ford Fiesta R5	(United Kingdom) Gus Greensmith	MON	SWE	MEX	ARG	POR	ITA	POL	FIN	GER	CHN; C	FRA	ESP	GBR; 12	AUS	–	0	2nd	131
2017	M-Sport World Rally Team	Ford Fiesta R5	(France) Eric Camilli	MON; 4	SWE; 4	MEX; 2	FRA; 8	ARG	POR; 7	ITA	POL	FIN	GER; 1	ESP	GBR; 2	AUS		2nd	91	2nd	155
2017	M-Sport World Rally Team	Ford Fiesta R5	(Finland) Teemu Suninen	MON	SWE; 2	MEX	FRA; 2	ARG	POR; 2	ITA	POL	FIN	GER; 7	ESP; 1	GBR; 13	AUS		3rd	85	2nd	155
2018	M-Sport Ford World Rally Team	Ford Fiesta R5	(France) Eric Camilli	MON; Ret	SWE	MEX	FRA	ARG	POR	ITA	FIN	GER; Ret	TUR	GBR; 10	ESP	AUS		41st	1	9th	51
2018	M-Sport Ford World Rally Team	Ford Fiesta R5	(Finland) Teemu Suninen	MON; 3	SWE	MEX	FRA	ARG	POR	ITA	FIN	GER	TUR	GBR	ESP	AUS		25th	15	9th	51
2018	M-Sport Ford World Rally Team	Ford Fiesta R5	(Chile) Alberto Heller	MON	SWE	MEX	FRA	ARG; Ret	POR	ITA	FIN	GER	TUR	GBR	ESP	AUS; 1		16th	25	9th	51
2018	M-Sport Ford World Rally Team	Ford Fiesta R5	(Finland) Jouni Virtanen	MON	SWE	MEX	FRA	ARG	POR	ITA	FIN; 15	GER	TUR	GBR	ESP	AUS		NC	0	9th	51
2020	M-Sport Ford WRT	Ford Fiesta R5 Mk. II	(France) Adrien Fourmaux	MON; 2	SWE; 4	MEX	EST; 2	TUR; 2	ITA; Ret	MNZ; 4								3rd	78	4th	88
2020	M-Sport Ford WRT	Ford Fiesta R5 Mk. II	(United Kingdom) Rhys Yates	MON; 4	SWE; 5	MEX	EST	TUR	ITA	MNZ								7th	22	4th	88
2021	M-Sport Ford WRT	Ford Fiesta R5 Mk. II	(France) Adrien Fourmaux	MON; 2	ARC; 9	CRO	POR	ITA; 6	KEN	EST; 4	BEL	GRE	FIN	ESP	MNZ			10th	48	3rd	146
2021	M-Sport Ford WRT	Ford Fiesta R5 Mk. II	(Czech Republic) Martin Prokop	MON	ARC; 6	CRO	POR; 7	ITA; 4	KEN; Ret	EST	BEL	GRE; 5	FIN; 4	ESP	MNZ			9th	51	3rd	146
2021	M-Sport Ford WRT	Ford Fiesta R5 Mk. II	(Finland) Teemu Suninen	MON	ARC	CRO; 2	POR; 2	ITA	KEN; WD	EST	BEL; Ret	GRE; WD	FIN	ESP	MNZ			5th	93	3rd	146
2021	M-Sport Ford WRT	Ford Fiesta R5 Mk. II	(Sweden) Tom Kristensson	MON	ARC	CRO; Ret	POR; 9	ITA	KEN	EST; 5	BEL; Ret	GRE	FIN; Ret	ESP	MNZ			15th	13	3rd	146
2021	M-Sport Ford WRT	Ford Fiesta R5 Mk. II	(Finland) Jari Huttunen	MON	ARC	CRO	POR	ITA	KEN	EST	BEL	GRE	FIN	ESP	MNZ; 1			3rd	107	3rd	146

* Season still in progress.

== WRC-2 Pro results ==
Year	Entrant	Car	Driver	1	2	3	4	5	6	7	8	9	10	11	12	13	14	WRC-2 Pro	Points	Teams	Points
2019	M-Sport Ford World Rally Team	Ford Fiesta R5	(United Kingdom) Gus Greensmith	MON; 1	SWE; 3	MEX	FRA	ARG; 2	CHL; 3	POR	ITA; 4	FIN; WD	GER	TUR; 1	GBR; 3	ESP; 4	AUS; C	3rd	137	2nd	259
2019	M-Sport Ford World Rally Team	Ford Fiesta R5	(Poland) Łukasz Pieniążek	MON	SWE; 4	MEX; 1	FRA; 1	ARG	CHL	POR; 4	ITA	FIN	GER	TUR	GBR	ESP	AUS; C	5th	74	2nd	259
2019	M-Sport Ford World Rally Team	Ford Fiesta R5	(France) Eric Camilli	MON	SWE	MEX	FRA	ARG	CHL	POR	ITA	FIN; 2	GER; 2	TUR	GBR	ESP	AUS; C	6th	36	2nd	259
2019	M-Sport Ford World Rally Team	Ford Fiesta R5	(New Zealand) Hayden Paddon	MON	SWE	MEX	FRA	ARG	CHL	POR	ITA	FIN	GER	TUR	GBR; 4	ESP	AUS; C	8th	12	2nd	259
