= 2023 Rally Chile =

2nd edition of Rally Chile

2023 Rally Chile Rally Chile BIOBÍO 2023
Round 11 of 13 in the 2023 World Rally Championship
← Previous event	Next event →
- Host country: Chile
- Rally base: Concepción, Biobío
- Dates run: 28 September – 1 October 2023
- Start location: Coronel, Biobío
- Finish location: Concepción, Biobío
- Stages: 16 (321.06 km; 199.50 miles)
- Stage surface: Gravel
- Transport distance: 912.03 km (566.71 miles)
- Overall distance: 1,233.09 km (766.21 miles)

Statistics
- Crews registered: 55
- Crews: 51 at start, 36 at finish

Overall results
- Overall winner: (Estonia) Ott Tänak (Estonia) Martin Järveoja (United Kingdom) M-Sport Ford WRT; 3:06:38.1
- Power Stage winner: (Finland) Kalle Rovanperä (Finland) Jonne Halttunen (Japan) Toyota Gazoo Racing WRT; 7:06.7

Support category results
- WRC-2 winner: (Sweden) Oliver Solberg (United Kingdom) Elliott Edmondson; 3:14:56.6
- WRC-3 winner: (Peru) Eduardo Castro (Argentina) Fernando Mussano; 3:36:41.7

The 2023 Rally Chile (also known as the Rally Chile BIOBÍO 2023) was a motor racing event for rally cars held from 28 September to 1 October 2023. It marked the second running of the Rally Chile, and was the eleventh round of the 2023 World Rally Championship, World Rally Championship-2 and World Rally Championship-3. The event was based in Concepción of the Biobío Region, and was contested over sixteen special stages covering a total competitive distance of 321.06 km (199.50 mi).

Ott Tänak and Martin Järveoja were the defending rally winners. The team they drove for in 2019, Toyota Gazoo Racing WRT, were the defending manufacturers' winners. Kalle Rovanperä and Jonne Halttunen were the defending rally winners in the WRC-2 category, (Note: The championship was known as the World Rally Championship-2 Pro in 2019.) and Takamoto Katsuta and Daniel Barritt were the defending rally winners in the WRC-3 category. (Note: The championship was known as the World Rally Championship-2 in 2019.) However, neither crews defended their titles as they were promoted to the top tier by Toyota in 2020.

Tänak and Järveoja successfully defended their title. Their team, M-Sport Ford WRT were the manufacturer's winners. This would be the final win achieved by the M-Sport team during the Rally1 regulations alongside being the final win for the Ford Puma Rally1. This race Toyota Gazoo Racing WRT sealed the manufacturer's title. Oliver Solberg and Elliott Edmondson won the World Rally Championship-2 category. Eduardo Castro and Fernando Mussano won the World Rally Championship-3 category, which meant Roope Korhonen and Anssi Viinikka became the 2023 WRC3 champions.

== Background ==
=== Entry list ===
The following crews entered into the rally. The event was opened to crews competing in the World Rally Championship, its support categories, the World Rally Championship-2, World Rally Championship-3 and privateer entries that were not registered to score points in any championship. Ten entered under Rally1 regulations, as were nineteen Rally2 crews in the World Rally Championship-2 and two Rally3 crews in the World Rally Championship-3.

Rally1 entries competing in the World Rally Championship
No.	Driver	Co-Driver	Entrant	Car	Championship eligibility	Tyre
3	(Finland) Teemu Suninen	(Finland) Mikko Markkula	(South Korea) Hyundai Shell Mobis WRT	Hyundai i20 N Rally1	Driver, Co-driver, Manufacturer	P
4	(Finland) Esapekka Lappi	(Finland) Janne Ferm	(South Korea) Hyundai Shell Mobis WRT	Hyundai i20 N Rally1	Driver, Co-driver, Manufacturer	P
7	(France) Pierre-Louis Loubet	(Belgium) Nicolas Gilsoul	(United Kingdom) M-Sport Ford WRT	Ford Puma Rally1	Driver, Co-driver, Manufacturer	P
8	(Estonia) Ott Tänak	(Estonia) Martin Järveoja	(United Kingdom) M-Sport Ford WRT	Ford Puma Rally1	Driver, Co-driver, Manufacturer	P
11	(Belgium) Thierry Neuville	(Belgium) Martijn Wydaeghe	(South Korea) Hyundai Shell Mobis WRT	Hyundai i20 N Rally1	Driver, Co-driver, Manufacturer	P
13	(Luxembourg) Grégoire Munster	(Belgium) Louis Louka	(United Kingdom) M-Sport Ford WRT	Ford Puma Rally1	Driver, Co-driver	P
18	(Japan) Takamoto Katsuta	(Republic of Ireland) Aaron Johnston	(Japan) Toyota Gazoo Racing WRT	Toyota GR Yaris Rally1	Driver, Co-driver, Manufacturer	P
28	(Chile) Alberto Heller	(Argentina) Luis Ernesto Allende	(United Kingdom) M-Sport Ford WRT	Ford Puma Rally1	Driver, Co-driver	P
33	(United Kingdom) Elfyn Evans	(United Kingdom) Scott Martin	(Japan) Toyota Gazoo Racing WRT	Toyota GR Yaris Rally1	Driver, Co-driver, Manufacturer	P
69	(Finland) Kalle Rovanperä	(Finland) Jonne Halttunen	(Japan) Toyota Gazoo Racing WRT	Toyota GR Yaris Rally1	Driver, Co-driver, Manufacturer	P

Rally2 entries competing in the World Rally Championship-2
No.	Driver	Co-Driver	Entrant	Car	Championship eligibility	Tyre
20	(France) Yohan Rossel	(France) Arnaud Dunand	(France) PH Sport	Citroën C3 Rally2	Driver, Co-driver	P
21	(Finland) Sami Pajari	(Finland) Enni Mälkönen	(Germany) Toksport WRT 2	Škoda Fabia RS Rally2	Challenger Driver, Challenger Co-Driver, Team	P
22	(Sweden) Oliver Solberg	(United Kingdom) Elliott Edmondson	(Sweden) Oliver Solberg	Škoda Fabia RS Rally2	Driver, Co-driver	P
23	(United Kingdom) Gus Greensmith	(Sweden) Jonas Andersson	(Germany) Toksport WRT 3	Škoda Fabia RS Rally2	Driver, Co-driver, Team	P
24	(Finland) Emil Lindholm	(Finland) Reeta Hämäläinen	(South Korea) Hyundai Motorsport N	Hyundai i20 N Rally2	Driver, Co-driver, Team	P
25	(Poland) Kajetan Kajetanowicz	(Poland) Maciej Szczepaniak	(Poland) Kajetan Kajetanowicz	Škoda Fabia RS Rally2	Challenger Driver, Challenger Co-driver	P
26	Nikolay Gryazin (Note: Nikolay Gryazin is Russian, but he competes as a neutral competitor using the ANA flag as Russian national emblems were banned by the association due to the Russian invasion of Ukraine.)	Konstantin Aleksandrov (Note: Konstantin Aleksandrov is Russian, but he competes as a neutral competitor using the ANA flag as Russian national emblems were banned by the association due to the Russian invasion of Ukraine.)	(Germany) Toksport WRT 2	Škoda Fabia RS Rally2	Challenger Driver, Challenger Co-driver, Team	P
27	(Bolivia) Marco Bulacia	(Spain) Diego Vallejo	(Germany) Toksport WRT	Škoda Fabia RS Rally2	Challenger Driver, Challenger Co-driver	P
29	(Chile) Jorge Martínez Fontena	(Argentina) Alberto Alvarez Nicholson	(Chile) Jorge Martínez Fontena	Škoda Fabia Rally2 evo	Challenger Driver, Challenger Co-driver	P
30	(Chile) Emilio Fernández	(Spain) Borja Rozada	(Chile) Emilio Fernández	Škoda Fabia Rally2 evo	Challenger Driver, Challenger Co-driver	P
31	(Bolivia) Bruno Bulacia	(Argentina) José Luis Díaz	(Bolivia) Bruno Bulacia	Škoda Fabia Rally2 evo	Challenger Driver, Challenger Co-driver	P
32	(Paraguay) Fabrizio Zaldivar	(Italy) Marcelo Der Ohannesian	(South Korea) Hyundai Motorsport N	Hyundai i20 N Rally2	Challenger Driver, Challenger Co-driver, Team	P
34	(Chile) Pedro Heller	(Argentina) Pablo Olmos	(Chile) Pedro Heller	Citroën C3 Rally2	Challenger Driver, Challenger Co-driver	P
35	(Chile) Emilio Rosselot	(Chile) Tomas Cañete	(Chile) Emilio Rosselot	Citroën C3 Rally2	Challenger Driver, Challenger Co-driver	P
36	(Chile) Benjamin Israel	(Argentina) Matias Ramos	(Chile) Benjamin Israel	Citroën C3 Rally2	Challenger Driver, Challenger Co-driver	P
37	(Argentina) Martin Scuncio	(Chile) Javiera Roman	(Argentina) Martin Scuncio	Škoda Fabia RS Rally2	Challenger Driver, Challenger Co-driver	P
38	(Chile) Germán Lyon	(Chile) Sebastian Vera	(Chile) Germán Lyon	Citroën C3 Rally2	Challenger Driver, Challenger Co-driver	P
39	(Chile) Gerardo V. Rosselot	(Argentina) Marcelo Brizio	(Chile) Gerardo V. Rosselot	Citroën C3 Rally2	Challenger Driver, Challenger Co-driver	P
40	(Chile) Eduardo Kovacs	(Argentina) Ruben Garcia	(Chile) Eduardo Kovacs	Škoda Fabia R5	Challenger/Masters Driver, Challenger Co-driver	P

Rally3 entries competing in the World Rally Championship-3
No.	Driver	Co-Driver	Entrant	Car	Tyre
41	(Paraguay) Diego Dominguez Jr	(Spain) Rogelio Peñate	(Paraguay) Diego Dominguez Jr	Ford Fiesta Rally3	P
44	(Peru) Eduardo Castro	(Argentina) Fernando Mussano	(Peru) Eduardo Castro	Ford Fiesta Rally3	P

=== Itinerary ===
All dates and times are CLT (UTC-3).

Date	No.	Time span	Stage name	Distance
28 September	—	After 8:01	Bio Bio [Shakedown]	5.75 km
28 September		After 19:00	Opening ceremony, Los Ángeles	—N/a
29 September	SS1	After 8:35	Pulperia 1	19.77 km
29 September	SS2	After 9:33	Rere 1	13.34 km
29 September	SS3	After 10:27	Rio Claro 1	23.32 km
29 September		13:07 – 13:37	Flexi service A, Talcahuano	—N/a
29 September	SS4	After 14:42	Pulperia 2	19.77 km
29 September	SS5	After 15:40	Rere 2	13.34 km
29 September	SS6	After 16:34	Rio Claro 2	23.32 km
29 September		18:44 – 19:29	Flexi service B, Talcahuano	—N/a
30 September	SS7	After 7:57	Chivilingo 1	27.23 km
30 September	SS8	After 9:01	Rio Lia 1	21.09 km
30 September	SS9	After 10:05	Maria de las Cruces 1	28.72 km
30 September		13:05 – 13:35	Flexi service C, Talcahuano	—N/a
30 September	SS10	After 14:57	Chivilingo 2	27.23 km
30 September	SS11	After 16:01	Rio Lia 2	21.09 km
30 September	SS12	After 17:05	Maria de las Cruces 2	28.72 km
30 September		19:12 – 19:57	Flexi service D, Talcahuano	—N/a
1 October	SS13	After 8:07	Las Pataguas 1	13.20 km
1 October	SS14	After 9:05	El Poñen 1	13.86 km
1 October		10:40 – 10:55	Flexi service E, Talcahuano	—N/a
1 October	SS15	After 11:40	Las Pataguas 2	13.20 km
1 October	SS16	After 13:15	El Poñen 2 [Power Stage]	13.86 km
1 October		After 14:20	Official finish, Talcahuano	—N/a
1 October		After 15:10	Podium ceremony, Talcahuano	—N/a

== Report ==
=== WRC Rally1 ===
==== Classification ====
Position		No.	Driver	Co-driver	Entrant	Car	Time	Difference	Points	
Event	Class	No.	Driver	Co-driver	Entrant	Car	Time	Difference	Event	Stage
1	1	8	Ott Tänak	Martin Järveoja	M-Sport Ford WRT	Ford Puma Rally1	3:06:38.1	0.0	25	2
2	2	11	Thierry Neuville	Martijn Wydaeghe	Hyundai Shell Mobis WRT	Hyundai i20 N Rally1	3:07:20.2	+42.1	18	3
3	3	33	Elfyn Evans	Scott Martin	Toyota Gazoo Racing WRT	Toyota GR Yaris Rally1	3:07:45.0	+1:06.9	15	4
4	4	69	Kalle Rovanperä	Jonne Halttunen	Toyota Gazoo Racing WRT	Toyota GR Yaris Rally1	3:08:49.1	+2:11.0	12	5
5	5	18	Takamoto Katsuta	Aaron Johnston	Toyota Gazoo Racing WRT	Toyota GR Yaris Rally1	3:11:19.6	+4:41.5	10	1
13	6	13	Grégoire Munster	Louis Louka	M-Sport Ford WRT	Ford Puma Rally1	3:23:17.8	+16:39.7	0	0
15	7	28	Alberto Heller	Luis Ernesto Allende	M-Sport Ford WRT	Ford Puma Rally1	3:26:41.0	+20:02.9	0	0
Retired SS15		3	Teemu Suninen	Mikko Markkula	Hyundai Shell Mobis WRT	Hyundai i20 N Rally1	Off-road		0	0
Retired SS3		7	Pierre-Louis Loubet	Nicolas Gilsoul	M-Sport Ford WRT	Ford Puma Rally1	Rolled		0	0
Retired SS1		4	Esapekka Lappi	Janne Ferm	Hyundai Shell Mobis WRT	Hyundai i20 N Rally1	Rolled		0	0

==== Special stages ====
Stage	Winners	Car	Time	Class leaders
SD	Evans / Martin	Toyota GR Yaris Rally1	3:59.6	—N/a
SS1	Tänak / Järveoja	Ford Puma Rally1	10:16.8	Tänak / Järveoja
SS2	Evans / Martin	Toyota GR Yaris Rally1	6:52.9	Evans / Martin
SS3	Evans / Martin	Toyota GR Yaris Rally1	12:32.0	Evans / Martin
SS4	Suninen / Markkula	Hyundai i20 N Rally1	9:58.7	Suninen / Markkula
SS5	Tänak / Järveoja	Ford Puma Rally1	6:39.8	Tänak / Järveoja
SS6	Tänak / Järveoja	Ford Puma Rally1	12:12.2	Tänak / Järveoja
SS7	Rovanperä / Halttunen	Toyota GR Yaris Rally1	17:20.7	Tänak / Järveoja
SS8	Tänak / Järveoja	Ford Puma Rally1	13:59.0	Tänak / Järveoja
SS9	Tänak / Järveoja	Ford Puma Rally1	17:40.9	Tänak / Järveoja
SS10	Rovanperä / Halttunen	Toyota GR Yaris Rally1	17:07.5	Tänak / Järveoja
SS11	Tänak / Järveoja	Ford Puma Rally1	13:47.8	Tänak / Järveoja
SS12	Tänak / Järveoja	Ford Puma Rally1	17:20.5	Tänak / Järveoja
SS13	Neuville / Wydaeghe	Hyundai i20 N Rally1	7:43.4	Tänak / Järveoja
SS14	Neuville / Wydaeghe	Hyundai i20 N Rally1	7:22.9	Tänak / Järveoja
SS15	Neuville / Wydaeghe	Hyundai i20 N Rally1	7:33.0	Tänak / Järveoja
SS16	Rovanperä / Halttunen	Toyota GR Yaris Rally1	7:06.7	Tänak / Järveoja

==== Championship standings ====
- **Bold text** indicates 2023 World Champions.

Pos.	Drivers' championships			Co-drivers' championships			Manufacturers' championships		
Pos.	Move	Driver	Points	Move	Co-driver	Points	Move	Manufacturer	Points
1		Kalle Rovanperä	217		Jonne Halttunen	217		**Toyota Gazoo Racing WRT**	466
2		Elfyn Evans	186		Scott Martin	186		Hyundai Shell Mobis WRT	360
3		Thierry Neuville	155		Martijn Wydaeghe	155		M-Sport Ford WRT	247
4		Ott Tänak	146		Martin Järveoja	146			
5		Sébastien Ogier	99		Vincent Landais	99			

=== WRC-2 Rally2 ===
==== Classification ====
Position		No.	Driver	Co-driver	Entrant	Car	Time	Difference	Points		
Event	Class	No.	Driver	Co-driver	Entrant	Car	Time	Difference	Class	Stage	Event
6	1	22	Oliver Solberg	Elliott Edmondson	Oliver Solberg	Škoda Fabia RS Rally2	3:14:56.6	0.0	25	2	8
7	2	23	Gus Greensmith	Jonas Andersson	Toksport WRT	Škoda Fabia RS Rally2	3:15:22.4	+25.8	18	1	6
8	3	21	Sami Pajari	Enni Mälkönen	Toksport WRT 2	Škoda Fabia RS Rally2	3:15:58.7	+1:02.1	15	0	4
9	4	20	Yohan Rossel	Arnaud Dunand	PH Sport	Citroën C3 Rally2	3:16:32.0	+1:35.4	12	0	2
10	5	26	Nikolay Gryazin	Konstantin Aleksandrov	Toksport WRT 2	Škoda Fabia RS Rally2	3:16:46.3	+1:49.7	10	0	1
11	6	35	Emilio Rosselot	Tomas Cañete	Emilio Rosselot	Citroën C3 Rally2	3:21:36.9	+6:40.3	8	0	0
12	7	34	Pedro Heller	Pablo Olmos	Pedro Heller	Citroën C3 Rally2	3:21:48.7	+6:52.1	6	0	0
14	8	32	Fabrizio Zaldivar	Marcelo Der Ohannesian	Hyundai Motorsport N	Hyundai i20 N Rally2	3:24:12.7	+9:16.1	4	0	0
16	9	29	Jorge Martínez Fontena	Alberto Alvarez Nicholson	Jorge Martínez Fontena	Škoda Fabia Rally2 evo	3:29:09.9	+14:13.3	2	3	0
17	10	30	Emilio Fernández	Borja Rozada	Emilio Fernández	Škoda Fabia Rally2 evo	3:30:43.2	+15:46.6	1	0	0
18	11	31	Bruno Bulacia	José Luis Díaz	Bruno Bulacia	Škoda Fabia Rally2 evo	3:31:35.0	+16:38.4	0	0	0
28	12	39	Gerardo V. Rosselot	Marcelo Brizio	Gerardo V. Rosselot	Citroën C3 Rally2	3:52:43.4	+37:46.8	0	0	0
33	13	40	Eduardo Kovacs	Ruben Garcia	Eduardo Kovacs	Škoda Fabia R5	4:21:18.1	+1:06:21.5	0	0	0
Retired SS15		24	Emil Lindholm	Reeta Hämäläinen	Hyundai Motorsport N	Hyundai i20 N Rally2	Accident damage		0	0	0
Retired SS15		25	Kajetan Kajetanowicz	Maciej Szczepaniak	Kajetan Kajetanowicz	Škoda Fabia RS Rally2	Rear suspension		0	0	0
Retired SS9		37	Martin Scuncio	Javiera Roman	Martin Scuncio	Škoda Fabia RS Rally2	Rolled		0	0	0
Retired SS8		36	Benjamin Israel	Matias Ramos	Benjamin Israel	Citroën C3 Rally2	Withdrawn		0	0	0
Retired SS6		27	Marco Bulacia	Diego Vallejo	Toksport WRT	Škoda Fabia RS Rally2	Accident damage		0	0	0
Retired SS6		38	Germán Lyon	Sebastian Vera	Germán Lyon	Citroën C3 Rally2	Accident		0	0	0

==== Special stages ====
Overall
Stage	Winners	Car	Time	Class leaders
SD	Lindholm / Hämäläinen	Hyundai i20 N Rally2	4:12.3	—N/a
SS1	Solberg / Edmondson	Škoda Fabia RS Rally2	10:43.3	Solberg / Edmondson
SS2	Pajari / Mälkönen	Škoda Fabia RS Rally2	7:10.1	Pajari / Mälkönen
SS3	Solberg / Edmondson	Škoda Fabia RS Rally2	12:54.9	Pajari / Mälkönen
SS4	Pajari / Mälkönen	Škoda Fabia RS Rally2	10:23.9	Pajari / Mälkönen
SS5	Pajari / Mälkönen	Škoda Fabia RS Rally2	6:57.6	Pajari / Mälkönen
SS6	Pajari / Mälkönen	Škoda Fabia RS Rally2	12:40.9	Pajari / Mälkönen
SS7	Solberg / Edmondson	Škoda Fabia RS Rally2	18:08.0	Solberg / Edmondson
SS8	Rossel / Dunand	Citroën C3 Rally2	14:29.8	Solberg / Edmondson
SS9	Gryazin / Aleksandrov	Škoda Fabia RS Rally2	18:22.5	Solberg / Edmondson
SS10	Greensmith / Andersson	Škoda Fabia RS Rally2	17:45.2	Pajari / Mälkönen
SS11	Rossel / Dunand	Citroën C3 Rally2	14:18.1	Pajari / Mälkönen
SS12	Solberg / Edmondson	Škoda Fabia RS Rally2	17:53.2	Solberg / Edmondson
SS13	Greensmith / Andersson	Škoda Fabia RS Rally2	8:14.1	Solberg / Edmondson
SS14	Solberg / Edmondson	Škoda Fabia RS Rally2	7:47.7	Solberg / Edmondson
SS15	Gryazin / Aleksandrov	Škoda Fabia RS Rally2	7:58.9	Solberg / Edmondson
SS16	Fontena / Nicholson	Škoda Fabia Rally2 evo	7:38.1	Solberg / Edmondson

Challenger
Stage	Winners	Car	Time	Class leaders
SD	Zaldivar / Der Ohannesian	Hyundai i20 N Rally2	4:15.1	—N/a
SS1	Pajari / Mälkönen	Škoda Fabia RS Rally2	10:43.4	Pajari / Mälkönen
SS2	Pajari / Mälkönen	Škoda Fabia RS Rally2	7:10.1	Pajari / Mälkönen
SS3	Pajari / Mälkönen	Škoda Fabia RS Rally2	12:57.4	Pajari / Mälkönen
SS4	Pajari / Mälkönen	Škoda Fabia RS Rally2	10:23.9	Pajari / Mälkönen
SS5	Pajari / Mälkönen	Škoda Fabia RS Rally2	6:57.6	Pajari / Mälkönen
SS6	Pajari / Mälkönen	Škoda Fabia RS Rally2	12:40.9	Pajari / Mälkönen
SS7	Fontena / Nicholson	Škoda Fabia Rally2 evo	18:19.3	Pajari / Mälkönen
SS8	Gryazin / Aleksandrov	Škoda Fabia RS Rally2	14:40.1	Pajari / Mälkönen
SS9	Gryazin / Aleksandrov	Škoda Fabia RS Rally2	18:22.5	Pajari / Mälkönen
SS10	Pajari / Mälkönen	Škoda Fabia RS Rally2	17:45.8	Pajari / Mälkönen
SS11	Kajetanowicz / Szczepaniak	Škoda Fabia RS Rally2	14:30.7	Pajari / Mälkönen
SS12	Kajetanowicz / Szczepaniak	Škoda Fabia RS Rally2	18:12.6	Pajari / Mälkönen
SS13	Pajari / Mälkönen	Škoda Fabia RS Rally2	8:18.7	Pajari / Mälkönen
SS14	Pajari / Mälkönen	Škoda Fabia RS Rally2	7:48.0	Pajari / Mälkönen
SS15	Gryazin / Aleksandrov	Škoda Fabia RS Rally2	7:58.9	Pajari / Mälkönen
SS16	Fontena / Nicholson	Škoda Fabia Rally2 evo	7:38.1	Pajari / Mälkönen

==== Championship standings ====
Pos.	Open Drivers' championships			Open Co-drivers' championships			Teams' championships			Challenger Drivers' championships			Challenger Co-drivers' championships		
Pos.	Move	Driver	Points	Move	Co-driver	Points	Move	Manufacturer	Points	Move	Manufacturer	Points	Move	Driver	Points
1		Andreas Mikkelsen	108		Torstein Eriksen	127		Toksport WRT 3	148		Sami Pajari	118		Enni Mälkönen	118
2		Yohan Rossel	104		Arnaud Dunand	104	1	Toksport WRT 2	148		Kajetan Kajetanowicz	93		Maciej Szczepaniak	93
3		Gus Greensmith	99		Jonas Andersson	99	1	M-Sport Ford WRT	146	1	Nikolay Gryazin	86		Konstantin Aleksandrov	86
4	2	Oliver Solberg	91	2	Elliott Edmondson	91		Toksport WRT	135	1	Marco Bulacia	72		Szymon Gospodarczyk	65
5	1	Sami Pajari	86	1	Enni Mälkönen	86		Hyundai Motorsport N	116		Mikołaj Marczyk	65		Diego Vallejo	62

=== WRC-3 Rally3 ===
==== Classification ====
Position		No.	Driver	Co-driver	Entrant	Car	Time	Difference	Points
Event	Class	No.	Driver	Co-driver	Entrant	Car	Time	Difference	Points
19	1	44	Eduardo Castro	Fernando Mussano	Eduardo Castro	Ford Fiesta Rally3	3:36:41.7	0.0	**25**
Retired SS15		41	Diego Dominguez Jr	Rogelio Peñate	Diego Dominguez Jr	Ford Fiesta Rally3	Withdrawn		**0**

==== Special stages ====
Stage	Winners	Car	Time	Class leaders
SD	Dominguez Jr / Peñate	Ford Fiesta Rally3	4:27.4	—N/a
SS1	Dominguez Jr / Peñate	Ford Fiesta Rally3	11:49.4	Dominguez Jr / Peñate
SS2	Dominguez Jr / Peñate	Ford Fiesta Rally3	7:55.2	Dominguez Jr / Peñate
SS3	Dominguez Jr / Peñate	Ford Fiesta Rally3	14:23.5	Dominguez Jr / Peñate
SS4	Dominguez Jr / Peñate	Ford Fiesta Rally3	11:32.9	Dominguez Jr / Peñate
SS5	Castro / Mussano	Ford Fiesta Rally3	7:59.8	Dominguez Jr / Peñate
SS6	Stage cancelled			
SS7	Dominguez Jr / Peñate	Ford Fiesta Rally3	19:27.1	Dominguez Jr / Peñate
SS8	Dominguez Jr / Peñate	Ford Fiesta Rally3	15:30.6	Dominguez Jr / Peñate
SS9	Castro / Mussano	Ford Fiesta Rally3	20:05.2	Dominguez Jr / Peñate
SS10	Dominguez Jr / Peñate	Ford Fiesta Rally3	19:03.6	Dominguez Jr / Peñate
SS11	Dominguez Jr / Peñate	Ford Fiesta Rally3	15:47.8	Dominguez Jr / Peñate
SS12	Dominguez Jr / Peñate	Ford Fiesta Rally3	19:33.1	Dominguez Jr / Peñate
SS13	Dominguez Jr / Peñate	Ford Fiesta Rally3	8:54.8	Dominguez Jr / Peñate
SS14	Castro / Mussano	Ford Fiesta Rally3	8:53.6	Dominguez Jr / Peñate
SS15	Castro / Mussano	Ford Fiesta Rally3	9:08.3	Castro / Mussano
SS16	Castro / Mussano	Ford Fiesta Rally3	8:42.7	Castro / Mussano

==== Championship standings ====
- **Bold text** indicates 2023 World Champions.

Pos.	Drivers' championships			Co-drivers' championships		
Pos.	Move	Driver	Points	Move	Co-driver	Points
1		**Roope Korhonen**	100		**Anssi Viinikka**	100
2		Diego Dominguez Jr.	87		Rogelio Peñate	87
3		Tom Rensonnet	55		Loïc Dumont	55
4		William Creighton	51		Liam Regan	51
5		Eamonn Kelly	49		Conor Mohan	49

== Notes ==
Previous rally: 2023 Acropolis Rally	2023 FIA World Rally Championship	Next rally: 2023 Central European Rally
Previous rally: 2019 Rally Chile; 2020 and 2021 editions cancelled	2023 Rally Chile	Next rally: 2024 Rally Chile
