= 2025 Rally Saudi Arabia =

1st edition of the Rally Saudi Arabia

2025 Rally Saudi Arabia Rally Saudi Arabia 2025
Round 14 of 14 in the 2025 World Rally Championship
← Previous event
- Host country: Saudi Arabia
- Rally base: Jeddah, Mecca Province
- Dates run: 26 – 29 November 2025
- Start location: Jeddah, Mecca Province
- Finish location: Jeddah, Mecca Province
- Stages: 17 (319.44 km; 198.49 miles)
- Stage surface: Gravel
- Transport distance: 899.13 km (558.69 miles)
- Overall distance: 1,218.57 km (757.18 miles)

Statistics
- Crews registered: 41
- Crews: 39 at start, 32 at finish

Overall results
- Overall winner: (Belgium) Thierry Neuville (Belgium) Martijn Wydaeghe (South Korea) Hyundai Shell Mobis WRT; 3:21:17.3
- Sunday Accumulated leader: (France) Sébastien Ogier (France) Vincent Landais (Japan) Toyota Gazoo Racing WRT; 37:47.7
- Power Stage winner: (United Kingdom) Elfyn Evans (United Kingdom) Scott Martin (Japan) Toyota Gazoo Racing WRT; 10:54.9

Support category results
- WRC-2 winner: (United Kingdom) Gus Greensmith (Sweden) Jonas Andersson; 3:32:45.6
- WRC-3 winner: (Italy) Matteo Fontana (Italy) Alessandro Arnaboldi; 3:50:14.8

The 2025 Rally Saudi Arabia was a motor racing event for rally cars held over four days from 26 to 29 November 2025. It marked the first running of the Rally Saudi Arabia, and was the final round of the 2025 World Rally Championship, 2025 WRC2 Championship and 2025 WRC3 Championship. The 2025 event was based in Jeddah, Mecca Province and was contested over seventeen special stages, covering a total competitive distance of 319.44 km (198.49 mi).

Thierry Neuville and Martijn Wydaeghe won the rally, and their team, Hyundai Shell Mobis WRT, are the manufacturer's winners. Sébastien Ogier and Vincent Landais won the 2025 world titles, with Ogier tying with Sébastien Loeb for most world titles. Gus Greensmith and Jonas Andersson were the winners in the WRC2 category, and Nikolay Gryazin and Konstantin Aleksandrov became the 2025 WRC2 Challenger champions. Matteo Fontana and Alessandro Arnaboldi were the winners in the WRC3 category.

== Background ==
=== Entry list ===
The following crews entered into the rally. The event was opened to crews competing in the World Rally Championship, its support categories, the WRC2 Championship, the WRC3 Championship and privateer entries that were not registered to score points in any championship. Twelve entered under Rally1 regulations, as were seventeen Rally2 crews in the WRC2 Championship and five Rally3 crew in the WRC3 Championship.

Rally1 entries competing in the World Rally Championship
No.	Driver	Co-Driver	Entrant	Car	Championship eligibility	Tyre
1	(Belgium) Thierry Neuville	(Belgium) Martijn Wydaeghe	(South Korea) Hyundai Shell Mobis WRT	Hyundai i20 N Rally1	Driver, Co-driver, Manufacturer	H
5	(Finland) Sami Pajari	(Finland) Marko Salminen	(Japan) Toyota Gazoo Racing WRT2	Toyota GR Yaris Rally1	Driver, Co-driver, Manufacturer, Team	H
8	(Estonia) Ott Tänak	(Estonia) Martin Järveoja	(South Korea) Hyundai Shell Mobis WRT	Hyundai i20 N Rally1	Driver, Co-driver	H
13	(Luxembourg) Grégoire Munster	(Belgium) Louis Louka	(United Kingdom) M-Sport Ford WRT	Ford Puma Rally1	Driver, Co-driver, Manufacturer	H
16	(France) Adrien Fourmaux	(France) Alexandre Coria	(South Korea) Hyundai Shell Mobis WRT	Hyundai i20 N Rally1	Driver, Co-driver, Manufacturer	H
17	(France) Sébastien Ogier	(France) Vincent Landais	(Japan) Toyota Gazoo Racing WRT	Toyota GR Yaris Rally1	Driver, Co-driver, Manufacturer	H
18	(Japan) Takamoto Katsuta	(Republic of Ireland) Aaron Johnston	(Japan) Toyota Gazoo Racing WRT	Toyota GR Yaris Rally1	Driver, Co-driver	H
20	(Qatar) Nasser Al-Attiyah	(Spain) Cándido Carrera	(United Kingdom) M-Sport Ford WRT	Ford Puma Rally1	Driver, Co-driver	H
22	(Latvia) Mārtiņš Sesks	(Latvia) Renārs Francis	(United Kingdom) M-Sport Ford WRT	Ford Puma Rally1	Driver, Co-driver	H
33	(United Kingdom) Elfyn Evans	(United Kingdom) Scott Martin	(Japan) Toyota Gazoo Racing WRT	Toyota GR Yaris Rally1	Driver, Co-driver, Manufacturer	H
55	(Republic of Ireland) Josh McErlean	(Republic of Ireland) Eoin Treacy	(United Kingdom) M-Sport Ford WRT	Ford Puma Rally1	Driver, Co-driver, Manufacturer	H
69	(Finland) Kalle Rovanperä	(Finland) Jonne Halttunen	(Japan) Toyota Gazoo Racing WRT	Toyota GR Yaris Rally1	Driver, Co-driver, Manufacturer	H

Rally2 entries competing in the WRC2 Championship
No.	Driver	Co-Driver	Entrant	Car	Championship eligibility	Tyre
23	(Finland) Roope Korhonen	(Finland) Anssi Viinikka	(Finland) Roope Korhonen	Toyota GR Yaris Rally2	Challenger Driver, Challenger Co-driver	H
24	(Estonia) Robert Virves	(Estonia) Jakko Viilo	(Germany) Toksport WRT	Škoda Fabia RS Rally2	Challenger Driver, Challenger Co-driver, Team	H
25	(United Kingdom) Gus Greensmith	(Sweden) Jonas Andersson	(United Kingdom) Gus Greensmith	Škoda Fabia RS Rally2	Driver, Co-driver	H
26	(Bulgaria) Nikolay Gryazin	(Kyrgyzstan) Konstantin Aleksandrov	(Germany) Toksport WRT	Škoda Fabia RS Rally2	Challenger Driver, Challenger Co-driver, Team	H
27	(Spain) Jan Solans	(Spain) Rodrigo Sanjuan de Eusebio	(Spain) PH.Ph	Toyota GR Yaris Rally2	Challenger Driver, Challenger Co-driver	H
28	(Poland) Kajetan Kajetanowicz	(Poland) Maciej Szczepaniak	(Poland) Kajetan Kajetanowicz	Toyota GR Yaris Rally2	Challenger Driver, Challenger Co-driver	H
29	(Spain) Alejandro Cachón	(Spain) Borja Rozada	(Spain) Toyota España	Toyota GR Yaris Rally2	Challenger Driver, Challenger Co-driver	H
30	(France) Pablo Sarrazin	(France) Yannick Roche	(Italy) Sarrazin Motorsport – Iron Lynx	Citroën C3 Rally2	Challenger Driver, Challenger Co-driver	H
31	(Poland) Daniel Chwist	(Poland) Kamil Heller	(Poland) Daniel Chwist	Škoda Fabia RS Rally2	Challenger Driver, Challenger Co-driver	H
32	(Germany) Fabio Schwarz	(Germany) Pascal Raabe	(Germany) Armin Schwarz Driving Experience	Toyota GR Yaris Rally2	Challenger Driver, Challenger Co-driver	H
34	(Paraguay) Diego Dominguez Jr.	(Spain) Rogelio Peñate	(Paraguay) Diego Dominguez Jr.	Toyota GR Yaris Rally2	Challenger Driver, Challenger Co-driver	H
35	(Mexico) Alejandro Mauro	(Spain) Adrián Pérez	(Mexico) Alejandro Mauro	Škoda Fabia RS Rally2	Challenger Driver, Challenger Co-driver	H
36	(Qatar) Abdulaziz Al-Kuwari	(Italy) Giovanni Bernacchini	(Qatar) Abdulaziz Al-Kuwari	Škoda Fabia RS Rally2	Challenger Driver, Challenger Co-driver	H
37	(Saudi Arabia) Hamza Bakhashab	(Republic of Ireland) Lorcan Moore	(Saudi Arabia) Hamza Bakhashab	Toyota GR Yaris Rally2	Challenger Driver, Challenger Co-driver	H
38	(Mexico) Miguel Granados	(Spain) Marc Martí	(Mexico) Miguel Granados	Škoda Fabia RS Rally2	Challenger/Masters Driver, Challenger/Masters Co-driver	H
39	(Qatar) Nasser Khalifa Al-Attiyah	(Lebanon) Ziad Chehab	(Qatar) Nasser Khalifa Al-Attiyah	Ford Fiesta Rally2	Challenger/Masters Driver, Challenger/Masters Co-driver	H
40	(Spain) Miguel Díaz-Aboitiz	(Spain) Diego Sanjuan	(Spain) Miguel Díaz-Aboitiz	Toyota GR Yaris Rally2	Challenger/Masters Driver, Challenger Co-driver	H

Rally3 entries competing in the WRC3 Championship
No.	Driver	Co-Driver	Entrant	Car	Class/Championship eligibility	Tyre
41	(Italy) Matteo Fontana	(Italy) Alessandro Arnaboldi	(Italy) Matteo Fontana	Ford Fiesta Rally3	WRC3	H
42	(Greece) Georgios Vasilakis	(Republic of Ireland) Allan Harryman	(Greece) Georgios Vasilakis	Ford Fiesta Rally3	WRC3, Masters Driver, Masters Co-Driver	H
43	(Turkey) Burcu Çetinkaya	(Italy) Fabrizia Pons	(Turkey) Burcu Çetinkaya	Renault Clio Rally3	WRC3	H
44	(Saudi Arabia) Saeed Al-Mouri	(Jordan) Ata Al-Hmoud	(Saudi Arabia) Saeed Al-Mouri	Renault Clio Rally3	WRC3	H
45	(India) Naveen Puligilla	(India) Musa Sherif	(India) Naveen Puligilla	Ford Fiesta Rally3	WRC3	H

Other major entries
No.	Driver	Co-Driver	Entrant	Car	Tyre
21	(Sweden) Oliver Solberg	(United Kingdom) Elliott Edmondson	(Finland) Printsport	Toyota GR Yaris Rally2	H

=== Itinerary ===
All dates and times are AST (UTC+3).

Date	No.	Time span	Stage name	Distance
25 November		After 20:00	Opening ceremony, Corniche Parade	—N/a
26 November	—	After 11:01	Thabhan [Shakedown]	4.56 km
26 November	SS1	After 20:05	Jameel Motorsport Super Special 1	5.22 km
27 November		6:25 – 6:40	Service A, Jeddah Corniche Circuit	—N/a
27 November	SS2	After 8:08	Al Fasallyah 1	19.36 km
27 November	SS3	After 9:06	Moon Stage 1	20.12 km
27 November	SS4	After 10:04	Khulays 1	11.33 km
27 November		11:54 – 12:14	Regroup, Jeddah Corniche Circuit	—N/a
27 November		12:14 – 13:29	Service B, Jeddah Corniche Circuit	—N/a
27 November	SS5	After 14:22	Al Fasallyah 2	19.36 km
27 November	SS6	After 15:20	Moon Stage 2	20.12 km
27 November	SS7	After 16:18	Khulays 2	11.33 km
27 November		18:08 – 19:08	Regroup, Jeddah Corniche Circuit	—N/a
27 November		19:23 – 20:08	Flexi service C, Jeddah Corniche Circuit	—N/a
27 November	SS8	After 20:23	Jameel Motorsport Super Special 2	5.22 km
28 November		7:15 – 7:30	Service D, Jeddah Corniche Circuit	—N/a
28 November	SS9	After 8:26	Alghullah 1	11.69 km
28 November	SS10	After 9:06	Um Al Jerem 1	30.58 km
28 November	SS11	After 10:04	Wadi Almatwi 1	28.59 km
28 November		11:45 – 12:15	Regroup, Jeddah Corniche Circuit	—N/a
28 November		12:15 – 12:55	Service E, Jeddah Corniche Circuit	—N/a
28 November	SS12	After 13:51	Alghullah 2	11.69 km
28 November	SS13	After 14:47	Um Al Jerem 2	30.58 km
28 November	SS14	After 16:05	Wadi Almatwi 2	28.59 km
28 November		17:25 – 18:10	Flexi service F, Jeddah Corniche Circuit	—N/a
29 November	SS15	After 8:35	Thabhan 1	16.39 km
29 November	SS16	After 10:01	Asfan	32.88 km
29 November		11:30 – 12:40	Regroup	—N/a
29 November	SS17	After 13:15	Thabhan 2 [Power Stage]	16.39 km
29 November		After 14:20	Podium ceremony, Jeddah Corniche Circuit	—N/a

== Report ==
=== WRC Rally1 ===
==== Classification ====
Position		No.	Driver	Co-driver	Entrant	Car	Time	Difference	Points			
Event	Class	No.	Driver	Co-driver	Entrant	Car	Time	Difference	Event	Saturday	Stage	Total
1	1	1	Thierry Neuville	Martijn Wydaeghe	Hyundai Shell Mobis WRT	Hyundai i20 N Rally1	3:21:17.3	0.0	25	3	0	28
2	2	16	Adrien Fourmaux	Alexandre Coria	Hyundai Shell Mobis WRT	Hyundai i20 N Rally1	3:22:12.0	+54.7	17	2	0	19
3	3	17	Sébastien Ogier	Vincent Landais	Toyota Gazoo Racing WRT	Toyota GR Yaris Rally1	3:22:20.6	+1:03.3	15	5	4	24
4	4	5	Sami Pajari	Marko Salminen	Toyota Gazoo Racing WRT2	Toyota GR Yaris Rally1	3:23:09.9	+1:51.7	12	1	0	13
5	5	18	Takamoto Katsuta	Aaron Johnston	Toyota Gazoo Racing WRT	Toyota GR Yaris Rally1	3:23:17.2	+1:59.9	10	0	1	11
6	6	33	Elfyn Evans	Scott Martin	Toyota Gazoo Racing WRT	Toyota GR Yaris Rally1	3:25:01.2	+3:43.9	8	4	5	17
7	7	69	Kalle Rovanperä	Jonne Halttunen	Toyota Gazoo Racing WRT	Toyota GR Yaris Rally1	3:26:48.8	+5:31.5	6	0	2	8
8	8	13	Grégoire Munster	Louis Louka	M-Sport Ford WRT	Ford Puma Rally1	3:28:24.5	+7:07.2	4	0	0	4
9	9	55	Josh McErlean	Eoin Treacy	M-Sport Ford WRT	Ford Puma Rally1	3:29:47.8	+8:30.5	2	0	0	2
11	10	10	Ott Tänak	Martin Järveoja	Hyundai Shell Mobis WRT	Hyundai i20 N Rally1	3:32:21.3	+11:04.0	0	0	3	3
15	11	20	Nasser Al-Attiyah	Cándido Carrera	M-Sport Ford WRT	Ford Puma Rally1	3:36:33.5	+15:16.2	0	0	0	0
Retired SS17		22	Mārtiņš Sesks	Renārs Francis	M-Sport Ford WRT	Ford Puma Rally1	Mechanical		0	0	0	0

==== Special stages ====
Stage	Winners	Car	Time	Class leaders
SD	Rovanperä / Halttunen	Toyota GR Yaris Rally1	3:01.0	—N/a
SS1	Tänak / Järveoja	Hyundai i20 N Rally1	3:53.3	Tänak / Järveoja
SS2	Sesks / Francis	Ford Puma Rally1	10:38.6	Sesks / Francis
SS3	Sesks / Francis	Ford Puma Rally1	15:22.4	Sesks / Francis
SS4	Pajari / Salminen	Toyota GR Yaris Rally1	9:37.9	Sesks / Francis
SS5	Sesks / Francis	Ford Puma Rally1	10:35.4	Sesks / Francis
SS6	Pajari / Salminen	Toyota GR Yaris Rally1	15:11.9	Pajari / Salminen
SS7	Tänak / Järveoja	Hyundai i20 N Rally1	9:14.3	Fourmaux / Coria
SS8	Ogier / Landais	Toyota GR Yaris Rally1	3:49.0	Fourmaux / Coria
SS9	Fourmaux / Coria	Hyundai i20 N Rally1	8:17.2	Fourmaux / Coria
SS10	Tänak / Järveoja	Hyundai i20 N Rally1	17:33.9	Fourmaux / Coria
SS11	Tänak / Järveoja	Hyundai i20 N Rally1	16:00.9	Fourmaux / Coria
SS12	Tänak / Järveoja	Hyundai i20 N Rally1	8:13.7	Fourmaux / Coria
SS13	Sesks / Francis	Ford Puma Rally1	17:34.0	Sesks / Francis
SS14	Rovanperä / Halttunen	Toyota GR Yaris Rally1	15:47.4	Sesks / Francis
SS15	Fourmaux / Coria	Hyundai i20 N Rally1	10:56.6	Neuville / Wydaeghe
SS16	Ogier / Landais	Toyota GR Yaris Rally1	15:40.9	Neuville / Wydaeghe
SS17	Evans / Martin	Toyota GR Yaris Rally1	10:54.9	Neuville / Wydaeghe

==== Championship standings ====
- **Bold text** indicates 2025 World Champions.

Drivers' Standings
Move	Pos.	Driver	Points
1	1	**Sébastien Ogier**	293
1	2	Elfyn Evans	289
	3	Kalle Rovanperä	256
	4	Ott Tänak	216
	5	Thierry Neuville	194

Co-drivers' Standings
Move	Pos.	Driver	Points
1	1	**Vincent Landais**	293
1	2	Scott Martin	289
	3	Jonne Halttunen	256
	4	Martin Järveoja	216
	5	Martijn Wydaeghe	194

Manufacturers' Standings
Move	Pos.	Driver	Points
	1	**Toyota Gazoo Racing WRT**	735
	2	Hyundai Shell Mobis WRT	511
	3	M-Sport Ford WRT	205
	4	Toyota Gazoo Racing WRT2	158

=== WRC2 Rally2 ===
==== Classification ====
Position		No.	Driver	Co-driver	Entrant	Car	Time	Difference	Points	
Event	Class	No.	Driver	Co-driver	Entrant	Car	Time	Difference	Class	Event
12	1	25	Gus Greensmith	Jonas Andersson	Gus Greensmith	Škoda Fabia RS Rally2	3:32:45.6	0.0	25	0
13	2	23	Nikolay Gryazin	Konstantin Aleksandrov	Toksport WRT	Toyota GR Yaris Rally2	3:33:21.0	+35.4	17	0
14	3	24	Robert Virves	Jakko Viilo	Toksport WRT	Škoda Fabia RS Rally2	3:35:46.5	+3:00.9	15	0
16	4	26	Diego Domínguez Jr.	Rogelio Peñate	Diego Domínguez Jr.	Toyota GR Yaris Rally2	3:47:37.3	+14:51.7	12	0
18	5	36	Abdulaziz Al-Kuwari	Giovanni Bernacchini	Abdulaziz Al-Kuwari	Škoda Fabia RS Rally2	3:50:47.9	+18:02.3	10	0
19	6	28	Kajetan Kajetanowicz	Maciej Szczepaniak	Kajetan Kajetanowicz	Toyota GR Yaris Rally2	3:52:57.3	+20:11.7	8	0
20	7	35	Alejandro Mauro	Adrián Pérez	Alejandro Mauro	Škoda Fabia RS Rally2	4:03:29.3	+30:43.7	6	0
21	8	37	Hamza Bakhashab	Lorcan Moore	Hamza Bakhashab	Toyota GR Yaris Rally2	4:10:21.6	+37:36.0	4	0
24	9	23	Roope Korhonen	Anssi Viinikka	Roope Korhonen	Toyota GR Yaris Rally2	4:24:36.0	+51:50.4	2	0
27	10	39	Nasser Khalifa Al-Attiyah	Ziad Chehab	Nasser Khalifa Al-Attiyah	Ford Fiesta Rally2	4:29:44.0	+56:58.4	1	0
30	11	40	Miguel Díaz-Aboitiz	Diego Sanjuan	Miguel Díaz-Aboitiz	Toyota GR Yaris Rally2	4:53:10.3	+1:20:24.7	0	0
Retired SS17		30	Pablo Sarrazin	Yannick Roche	Sarrazin Motorsport – Iron Lynx	Citroën C3 Rally2	Mechanical		0	0
Retired SS17		22	Jan Solans	Rodrigo Sanjuan de Eusebio	PH.Ph	Toyota GR Yaris Rally2	Retired		0	0
Retired SS16		38	Miguel Granados	Marc Martí	Miguel Granados	Škoda Fabia RS Rally2	Retired		0	0
Retired SS15		31	Daniel Chwist	Kamil Heller	Daniel Chwist	Škoda Fabia RS Rally2	Retired		0	0
Retired SS10		32	Fabio Schwarz	Pascal Raabe	Armin Schwarz Driving Experience	Toyota GR Yaris Rally2	Accident		0	0
Retired SS2		24	Alejandro Cachón	Borja Rozada	Toyota España	Toyota GR Yaris Rally2	Medical reasons		0	0

==== Special stages ====
Overall
Stage	Winners	Car	Time	Class leaders
SD	Greensmith / Andersson	Škoda Fabia RS Rally2	3:12.0	—N/a
SS1	Kajetanowicz / Szczepaniak	Toyota GR Yaris Rally2	4:05.3	Kajetanowicz / Szczepaniak
SS2	Greensmith / Andersson	Škoda Fabia RS Rally2	11:16.5	Greensmith / Andersson
SS3	Virves / Viilo	Škoda Fabia RS Rally2	15:49.9	Greensmith / Andersson
SS4	Gryazin / Aleksandrov	Škoda Fabia RS Rally2	9:54.0	Greensmith / Andersson
SS5	Greensmith / Andersson	Škoda Fabia RS Rally2	11:12.7	Greensmith / Andersson
SS6	Gryazin / Aleksandrov	Škoda Fabia RS Rally2	15:48.4	Greensmith / Andersson
SS7	Korhonen / Viinikka	Toyota GR Yaris Rally2	9:50.1	Greensmith / Andersson
SS8	Virves / Viilo	Škoda Fabia RS Rally2	4:02.0	Greensmith / Andersson
SS9	Gryazin / Aleksandrov	Škoda Fabia RS Rally2	8:45.0	Greensmith / Andersson
SS10	Greensmith / Andersson	Škoda Fabia RS Rally2	18:38.3	Greensmith / Andersson
SS11	Virves / Viilo	Škoda Fabia RS Rally2	16:52.3	Greensmith / Andersson
SS12	Solans / Sanjuan de Eusebio	Toyota GR Yaris Rally2	8:43.2	Greensmith / Andersson
SS13	Greensmith / Andersson	Škoda Fabia RS Rally2	18:51.6	Greensmith / Andersson
SS14	Gryazin / Aleksandrov	Škoda Fabia RS Rally2	16:47.4	Greensmith / Andersson
SS15	Greensmith / Andersson	Škoda Fabia RS Rally2	11:31.3	Greensmith / Andersson
SS16	Virves / Viilo	Škoda Fabia RS Rally2	16:52.6	Greensmith / Andersson
SS17	Virves / Viilo	Škoda Fabia RS Rally2	11:42.0	Greensmith / Andersson

Challenger
Stage	Winners	Car	Time	Class leaders
SD	Sarrazin / Combe	Citroën C3 Rally2	3:14.1	—N/a
SS1	Kajetanowicz / Szczepaniak	Toyota GR Yaris Rally2	4:05.3	Kajetanowicz / Szczepaniak
SS2	Korhonen / Viinikka	Toyota GR Yaris Rally2	11:18.9	Korhonen / Viinikka
SS3	Virves / Viilo	Škoda Fabia RS Rally2	15:49.9	Kajetanowicz / Szczepaniak
SS4	Gryazin / Aleksandrov	Škoda Fabia RS Rally2	9:54.0	Kajetanowicz / Szczepaniak
SS5	Korhonen / Viinikka	Toyota GR Yaris Rally2	11:15.8	Kajetanowicz / Szczepaniak
SS6	Gryazin / Aleksandrov	Škoda Fabia RS Rally2	15:48.4	Kajetanowicz / Szczepaniak
SS7	Korhonen / Viinikka	Toyota GR Yaris Rally2	9:50.1	Kajetanowicz / Szczepaniak
SS8	Virves / Viilo	Škoda Fabia RS Rally2	4:02.0	Kajetanowicz / Szczepaniak
SS9	Gryazin / Aleksandrov	Škoda Fabia RS Rally2	8:45.0	Korhonen / Viinikka
SS10	Gryazin / Aleksandrov	Škoda Fabia RS Rally2	18:45.6	Gryazin / Aleksandrov
SS11	Virves / Viilo	Škoda Fabia RS Rally2	16:52.3	Kajetanowicz / Szczepaniak
SS12	Solans / Sanjuan de Eusebio	Toyota GR Yaris Rally2	8:43.2	Kajetanowicz / Szczepaniak
SS13	Gryazin / Aleksandrov	Škoda Fabia RS Rally2	18:58.7	Gryazin / Aleksandrov
SS14	Gryazin / Aleksandrov	Škoda Fabia RS Rally2	16:47.4	Gryazin / Aleksandrov
SS15	Gryazin / Aleksandrov	Škoda Fabia RS Rally2	11:43.4	Gryazin / Aleksandrov
SS16	Virves / Viilo	Škoda Fabia RS Rally2	16:52.6	Gryazin / Aleksandrov
SS17	Virves / Viilo	Škoda Fabia RS Rally2	11:42.0	Gryazin / Aleksandrov

==== Championship standings ====
- **Bold text** indicates 2025 World Champions.

Drivers' Standings
Move	Pos.	Driver	Points
	1	**Oliver Solberg**	135
	2	Yohan Rossel	99
	3	Nikolay Gryazin	91
4	4	Gus Greensmith	82
2	5	Robert Virves	75

Co-drivers' Standings
Move	Pos.	Driver	Points
	1	**Elliott Edmondson**	135
	2	Arnaud Dunand	99
	3	Konstantin Aleksandrov	91
4	4	Jonas Andersson	82
2	5	Jakko Viilo	75

Manufacturers' Standings
Move	Pos.	Driver	Points
	1	**Toksport WRT**	215
	2	PH Sport	178
	3	Toyota Gazoo Racing WRT NG	89
	4	Sarrazin Motorsport – Iron Lynx	64

Challenger Drivers' Standings
Move	Pos.	Driver	Points
	1	**Nikolay Gryazin**	119
	2	Roope Korhonen	94
2	3	Robert Virves	92
1	4	Jan Solans	87
1	5	Roberto Daprà	86

Challenger Co-drivers' Standings
Move	Pos.	Driver	Points
	1	**Konstantin Aleksandrov**	119
	2	Anssi Viinikka	94
2	5	Jakko Viilo	92
1	4	Diego Sanjuan de Eusebio	87
1	5	Maciej Szczepaniak	82

=== WRC3 Rally3 ===
==== Classification ====
Position		No.	Driver	Co-driver	Entrant	Car	Time	Difference	Points
Event	Class	No.	Driver	Co-driver	Entrant	Car	Time	Difference	Points
17	1	41	Matteo Fontana	Alessandro Arnaboldi	Matteo Fontana	Ford Fiesta Rally3	3:50:14.8	0.0	**25**
26	2	45	Naveen Puligilla	Musa Sherif	Naveen Puligilla	Ford Fiesta Rally3	4:28:58.7	+38:43.9	**17**
28	3	44	Saeed Al-Mouri	Ata Al-Hmoud	Saeed Al-Mouri	Renault Clio Rally3	4:36:56.2	+46:41.4	**15**
29	4	43	Burcu Çetinkaya	Fabrizia Pons	Burcu Çetinkaya	Renault Clio Rally3	4:49:49.6	+59:34.8	**12**
32	5	42	Georgios Vasilakis	Allan Harryman	Georgios Vasilakis	Ford Fiesta Rally3	5:17:11.3	+1:26:56.5	**10**

==== Special stages ====
Stage	Winners	Car	Time	Class leaders
SD	Fontana / Arnaboldi	Ford Fiesta Rally3	3:35.3	—N/a
SS1	Fontana / Arnaboldi	Ford Fiesta Rally3	4:24.0	Fontana / Arnaboldi
SS2	Fontana / Arnaboldi	Ford Fiesta Rally3	11:31.9	Fontana / Arnaboldi
SS3	Fontana / Arnaboldi	Ford Fiesta Rally3	16:51.4	Fontana / Arnaboldi
SS4	Fontana / Arnaboldi	Ford Fiesta Rally3	10:40.3	Fontana / Arnaboldi
SS5	Fontana / Arnaboldi	Ford Fiesta Rally3	12:11.2	Fontana / Arnaboldi
SS6	Fontana / Arnaboldi	Ford Fiesta Rally3	16:37.8	Fontana / Arnaboldi
SS7	Fontana / Arnaboldi	Ford Fiesta Rally3	10:43.2	Fontana / Arnaboldi
SS8	Fontana / Arnaboldi	Ford Fiesta Rally3	4:20.5	Fontana / Arnaboldi
SS9	Fontana / Arnaboldi	Ford Fiesta Rally3	9:31.7	Fontana / Arnaboldi
SS10	stage cancelled			
SS11	Fontana / Arnaboldi	Ford Fiesta Rally3	18:28.6	Fontana / Arnaboldi
SS12	Fontana / Arnaboldi	Ford Fiesta Rally3	9:32.7	Fontana / Arnaboldi
SS13	Fontana / Arnaboldi	Ford Fiesta Rally3	21:00.0	Fontana / Arnaboldi
SS14	Fontana / Arnaboldi	Ford Fiesta Rally3	18:53.2	Fontana / Arnaboldi
SS15	Fontana / Arnaboldi	Ford Fiesta Rally3	12:42.0	Fontana / Arnaboldi
SS16	Fontana / Arnaboldi	Ford Fiesta Rally3	18:38.5	Fontana / Arnaboldi
SS17	Fontana / Arnaboldi	Ford Fiesta Rally3	12:52.8	Fontana / Arnaboldi

==== Championship standings ====
- **Bold text** indicates 2025 World Champions.

Drivers' Standings
Move	Pos.	Driver	Points
	1	**Matteo Fontana**	134
	2	Taylor Gill	117
	3	Ghjuvanni Rossi	78
	4	Kerem Kazaz	72
	5	Arthur Pelamourges	60

Co-drivers' Standings
Move	Pos.	Driver	Points
	1	**Alessandro Arnaboldi**	134
	2	Daniel Brkic	117
	3	Kylian Sarmezan	78
	4	Corentin Silvestre	72
	5	Bastien Pouget	60

Previous rally: 2025 Rally Japan	2025 FIA World Rally Championship	Next rally: 2026 Monte Carlo Rally (2026)
Previous rally: None	Rally Saudi Arabia	Next rally: 2026 Rally Saudi Arabia
