= 2017 Rally Argentina =

Rally championship held in Argentina

2017 Rally Argentina: 37. YPF Rally Argentina 2017
Round 5 of the 2017 World Rally Championship
← Previous event	Next event →
- Host country: Argentina
- Rally base: (Argentina) Villa Carlos Paz
- Dates run: 27 – 30 April 2017
- Stages: 18 (357.59 km; 222.20 miles)
- Stage surface: Gravel

Statistics
- Crews: 22 at start, 17 at finish

Overall results
- Overall winner: (Belgium) Thierry Neuville (Belgium) Nicolas Gilsoul (South Korea) Hyundai Motorsport

The 2017 Rally Argentina was the fifth round of the 2017 World Rally Championship and was the 37th running of the Rally Argentina. Thierry Neuville and Nicolas Gilsoul won the rally. Elfyn Evans and Daniel Barritt had led the rally for most of its stages, but after clipping a bridge on the final stage, the victory was Neuville's by just 7 tenths of a second.

WRC-2 championship leaders Pontus Tidemand and Jonas Andersson won the WRC-2 class, their third of the year.

== Classification ==
Key
Icon	Class
WRC	WRC entries eligible to score manufacturer points
WRC	Major entry ineligible to score manufacturer points
WRC-2	Registered to take part in WRC-2 championship

=== Event standings ===
Pos.	No.	Driver	Co-driver	Team	Car	Class	Time	Difference	Points
1	5	(Belgium) Thierry Neuville	(Belgium) Nicolas Gilsoul	(South Korea) Hyundai Motorsport	Hyundai i20 Coupe WRC	WRC	3:38:10.6	0.0	30
2	3	(United Kingdom) Elfyn Evans	(United Kingdom) Daniel Barritt	(United Kingdom) M-Sport World Rally Team	Ford Fiesta WRC	WRC	3:38:11.3	+0.7	22
3	2	(Estonia) Ott Tänak	(Estonia) Martin Järveoja	(United Kingdom) M-Sport World Rally Team	Ford Fiesta WRC	WRC	3:38:40.5	+29.9	18
4	1	(France) Sébastien Ogier	(France) Julien Ingrassia	(United Kingdom) M-Sport World Rally Team	Ford Fiesta WRC	WRC	3:39:35.3	+1:24.7	14
5	10	(Finland) Jari-Matti Latvala	(Finland) Miikka Anttila	(Japan) Toyota Gazoo Racing WRT	Toyota Yaris WRC	WRC	3:39:58.7	+1:48.1	11
6	4	(New Zealand) Hayden Paddon	(New Zealand) John Kennard	(South Korea) Hyundai Motorsport	Hyundai i20 Coupe WRC	WRC	3:45:53.3	+7:42.7	8
7	11	(Finland) Juho Hänninen	(Finland) Kaj Lindström	(Japan) Toyota Gazoo Racing WRT	Toyota Yaris WRC	WRC	3:49:27.5	+11:16.9	6
8	6	(Spain) Dani Sordo	(Spain) Marc Martí	(South Korea) Hyundai Motorsport	Hyundai i20 Coupe WRC	WRC	3:52:54.7	+14:44.1	4
9	14	(Norway) Mads Østberg	(Norway) Ola Fløene	(United Kingdom) M-Sport World Rally Team	Ford Fiesta WRC	WRC	3:53:21.9	+15:11.3	2
10	31	(Sweden) Pontus Tidemand	(Sweden) Jonas Andersson	(Czech Republic) Škoda Motorsport	Škoda Fabia R5	WRC-2	3:55:42.7	+17:32.1	1

=== Special stages ===
Day	Stage	Name	Length	Winner	Car	Time	Rally leader
Leg 1	SS1	SSS Ciudad de Cordoba	1.75 km	(France) Sébastien Ogier	Ford Fiesta WRC	1:53.8	(France) Sébastien Ogier
Leg 1	SS2	San Agustin - Villa General Belgrano 1	19.95 km	(United Kingdom) Elfyn Evans	Ford Fiesta WRC	12:42.3	(United Kingdom) Elfyn Evans
Leg 1	SS3	Amboy - Santa Monica 1	20.44 km	(United Kingdom) Elfyn Evans	Ford Fiesta WRC	10:18.8	(United Kingdom) Elfyn Evans
Leg 1	SS4	Santa Rosa - San Agustin 1	23.85 km	(United Kingdom) Elfyn Evans	Ford Fiesta WRC	13:44.8	(United Kingdom) Elfyn Evans
Leg 1	SS5	SSS Fernet Branca 1	6.04 km	(United Kingdom) Elfyn Evans	Ford Fiesta WRC	4:43.5	(United Kingdom) Elfyn Evans
Leg 1	SS6	San Agustin - Villa General Belgrano 2	19.95 km	(United Kingdom) Elfyn Evans	Ford Fiesta WRC	12:35.9	(United Kingdom) Elfyn Evans
Leg 1	SS7	Amboy - Santa Monica 2	20.44 km	(United Kingdom) Elfyn Evans (New Zealand) Hayden Paddon	Ford Fiesta WRC; Hyundai i20 Coupe WRC	10:21.1	(United Kingdom) Elfyn Evans
Leg 1	SS8	Santa Rosa - San Agustin 2	23.85 km	(New Zealand) Hayden Paddon	Hyundai i20 Coupe WRC	13:39.0	(United Kingdom) Elfyn Evans
Leg 1	SS9	SSS Fernet Branca 2	6.04 km	(Belgium) Thierry Neuville	Hyundai i20 Coupe WRC	4:49.4	(United Kingdom) Elfyn Evans
Leg 2	SS10	Tanti - Villa Bustos 1	20.08 km	(United Kingdom) Elfyn Evans	Ford Fiesta WRC	11:00.2	(United Kingdom) Elfyn Evans
Leg 2	SS11	Los Gigantes - Cantera El Condor 1	38.68 km	(United Kingdom) Kris Meeke	Citroën C3 WRC	20:01.6	(United Kingdom) Elfyn Evans
Leg 2	SS12	Boca del Arroyo - Bajo del Pungo 1	20.52 km	(United Kingdom) Kris Meeke	Citroën C3 WRC	13:18.2	(United Kingdom) Elfyn Evans
Leg 2	SS13	Tanti - Villa Bustos 2	20.08 km	(Estonia) Ott Tänak	Ford Fiesta WRC	10:47.9	(United Kingdom) Elfyn Evans
Leg 2	SS14	Los Gigantes - Cantera El Condor 2	38.68 km	(Estonia) Ott Tänak (Belgium) Thierry Neuville	Ford Fiesta WRC; Hyundai i20 Coupe WRC	19:45.5	(United Kingdom) Elfyn Evans
Leg 2	SS15	Boca del Arroyo - Bajo del Pungo 2	20.52 km	(Belgium) Thierry Neuville	Hyundai i20 Coupe WRC	12:59.5	(United Kingdom) Elfyn Evans
Leg 3	SS16	El Condor - Copina	16.32 km	(Estonia) Ott Tänak	Ford Fiesta WRC	13:07.0	(United Kingdom) Elfyn Evans
Leg 3	SS17	Mina Clavero - Giulio Cesare	22.64 km	(Belgium) Thierry Neuville	Hyundai i20 Coupe WRC	18:05.0	(United Kingdom) Elfyn Evans
Leg 3	SS18	El Condor [Power Stage]	16.32 km	(Belgium) Thierry Neuville	Hyundai i20 Coupe WRC	13:00.1	(Belgium) Thierry Neuville

=== Power Stage ===
The Power Stage was a 16.32 km (10.1 mi) stage at the end of the rally.

Pos.	Driver	Co-driver	Car	Time	Diff.	Pts.
1	(Belgium) Thierry Neuville	(Belgium) Nicolas Gilsoul	Hyundai i20 Coupe WRC	13:00.1		5
2	(United Kingdom) Elfyn Evans	(United Kingdom) Daniel Barritt	Ford Fiesta WRC	13:01.4	+1.3	4
3	(Estonia) Ott Tänak	(Estonia) Martin Järveoja	Ford Fiesta WRC	13:02.8	+2.7	3
4	(France) Sébastien Ogier	(France) Julien Ingrassia	Ford Fiesta WRC	13:04.3	+4.2	2
5	(Finland) Jari-Matti Latvala	(Finland) Miikka Anttila	Toyota Yaris WRC	13:08.5	+8.4	1

=== Championship standings after the rally ===
Drivers' Championship standings

Pos.	Driver	Points
1	(France) Sébastien Ogier	102
2	(Finland) Jari-Matti Latvala	86
3	(Belgium) Thierry Neuville	84
4	(Estonia) Ott Tänak	66
5	(Spain) Dani Sordo	51

Manufacturers' Championship standings

Pos.	Manufacturer	Points
1	(United Kingdom) M-Sport World Rally Team	162
2	(South Korea) Hyundai Motorsport	140
3	(Japan) Toyota Gazoo Racing WRT	99
4	(France) Citroën Total Abu Dhabi WRT	71
