= Elfyn Evans =

Welsh rally driver (born 1988)

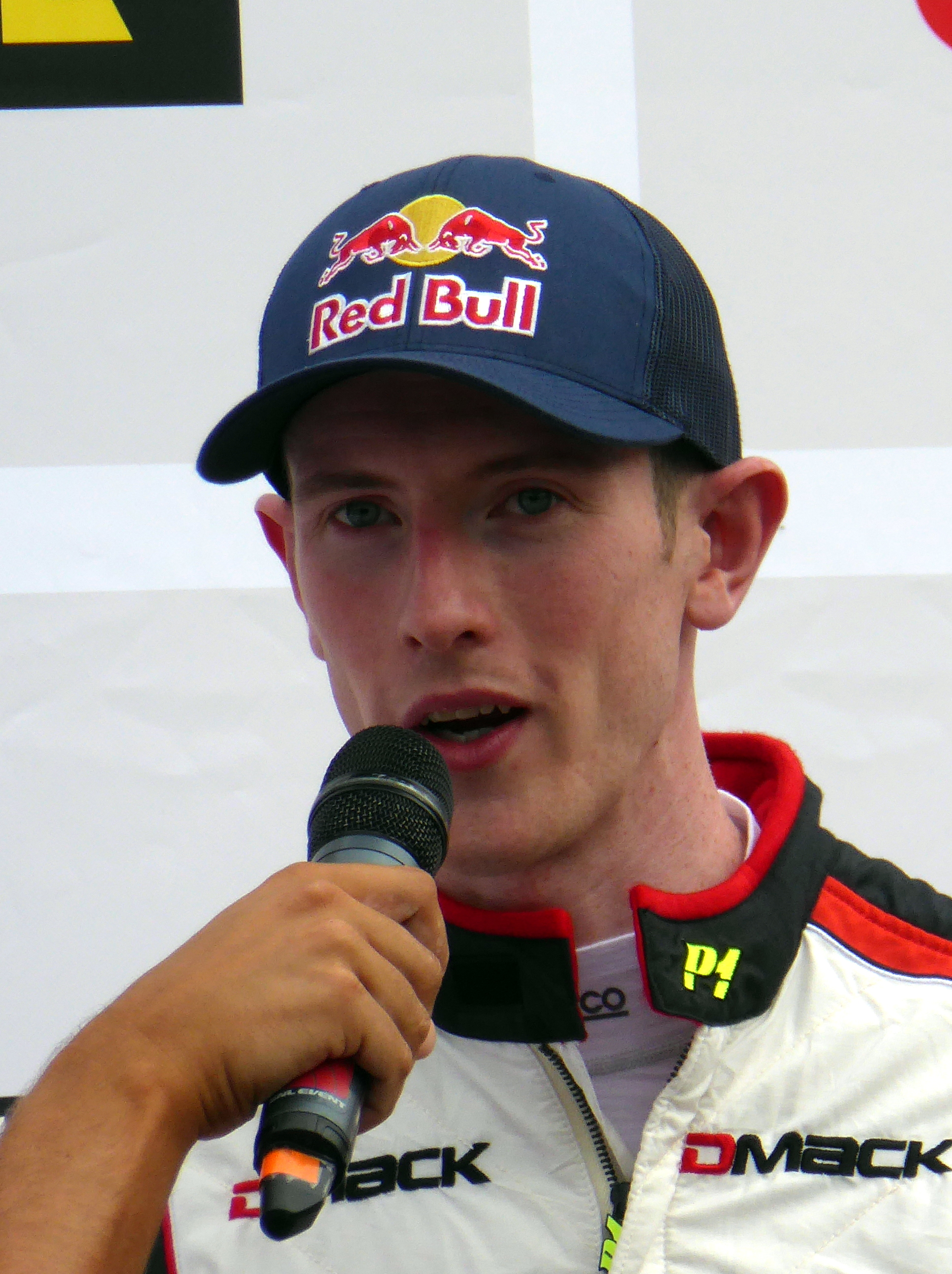
- Evans in 2017

Personal information
- Nationality: (Wales) Welsh
- Full name: Elfyn Rhys Evans
- Born: 28 December 1988 (age 37); Dolgellau, Wales

World Rally Championship record
- Years active: 2007, 2011, 2013–present
- Co-driver: (United Kingdom) Richard Edwards (United Kingdom) Andrew Edwards (United Kingdom) Phil Pugh (United Kingdom) Sebastian Marshall (United Kingdom) Daniel Barritt (Italy) Giovanni Bernacchini (United Kingdom) Craig Parry (United Kingdom) Phil Mills (United Kingdom) Scott Martin
- Teams: M-Sport World Rally Team; Toyota Gazoo Racing WRT
- Rallies: 169
- Championships: 1 (2026)
- Rally wins: 13
- Podiums: 51
- Stage wins: 227
- Total points: 1892
- First rally: 2007 Wales Rally GB
- First win: 2017 Wales Rally GB
- Last win: 2026 Rally Japan
- Last rally: 2026 Rally Italia Sardegna

Elfyn Rhys Evans (Welsh pronunciation: [ˈɛlvɨnˈɛvans]; born 28 December 1988) is a Welsh professional rally driver. He has competed full-time in the World Rally Championship since 2014, originally for M-Sport Ford, and since 2020 for Toyota Gazoo Racing. He is the reigning world drivers' champion having won the 2026 World Rally Championship, making him the first Welshman to win the drivers' championship, and the first British driver to win the drivers' championship since Richard Burns in 2001. Evans was also runner-up in 2020, 2021, 2023, 2024 and 2025. Scott Martin has been his co-driver since 2019.

== Rally career ==
=== Early years ===
Born in Dolgellau, Evans is the son of 1996 British Rally Championship Champion and former WRC driver Gwyndaf Evans. He is sponsored by the family's Ford motor dealership, first established by his great-grandfather in Dinas Mawddwy, renamed to Gwyndaf Evans Motors in 1983.

Evans began his professional career in 2006, driving a Nissan Micra in the Formula 1000 Forest Rally Championship. His first event was the Wyedean. He finished runner up in the championship.

In his second year, he drove the Group N production-car-class Ford Fiesta in the Ford Fiesta Sporting Trophy. He also competed in that year's Rally GB in Wales. In 2010, Evans won the British Junior Rally championship and was the winner of the UK Ford Fiesta Trophy series, also he won the Pirelli Star Driver Shoot-out after two days of tests and assessments at the Sweet Lamb rally complex in his native Wales, with a prize of a fully funded season in a Pirelli-backed Group N Subaru Impreza run by the championship-winning TEG Sport team – a prize worth in excess of £200,000.

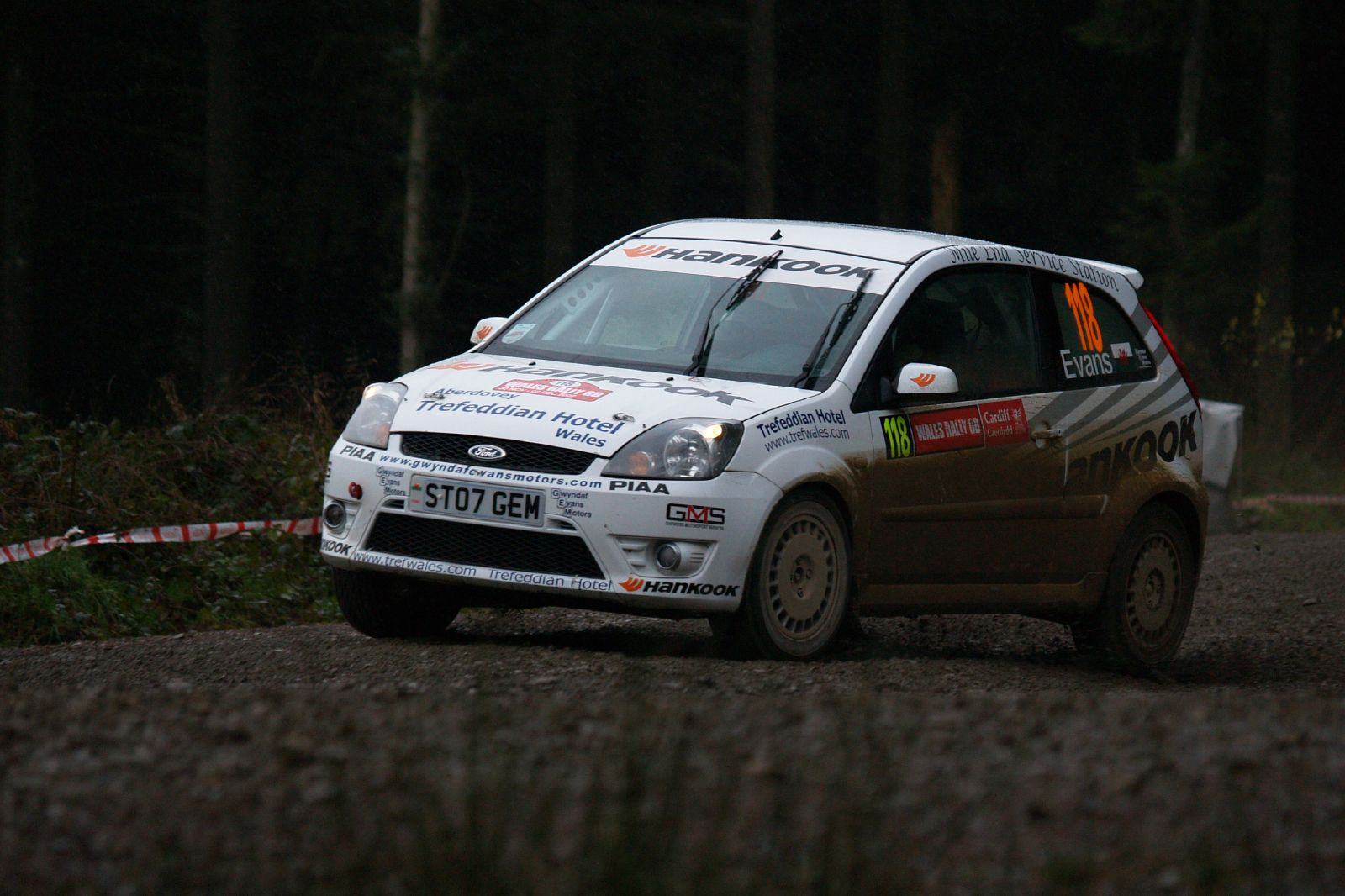
Evans at the 2007 Wales Rally GB

In 2012, Evans secured the FIA World Rally Championship (WRC) Academy title, the R2 title in the British Rally Championship (BRC) and the UK Fiesta Sport Trophy. In addition, he won the end-of-year FST International Shootout. In 2013, he contested a programme of WRC events in a 4WD car – his prize for winning the WRC Academy – and worked at M-Sport, helping to develop rally cars for the WRC and other championships.

Evans' 2013 season began with the first round of the Australian Rally Championship, the National Rally in Canberra, in which he retired early on the first day. He then drove a Fiesta RRC on the WRC Rally of Portugal, retiring with a transmission problem before starting the final day under Rally 2 regulations. After Nasser Al-Attiyah was forced to withdraw because of commitments in Qatar, Evans was asked to compete in the Rally Italy in Sardinia in a Ford Fiesta World Rally Car. Despite competing in a WRC car for the first time with no pre-event testing, Evans finished sixth overall.

=== M-Sport Ford (2014–2020) ===
==== 2014: First full WRC season ====
Evans at the 2014 Rally Sweden

Evans and co-driver Daniel Barritt were signed by M-Sport for the 2014 season to drive a Ford Fiesta WRC, partnering veteran driver Mikko Hirvonen. Their best results were fourth at Mexico and Germany, with one power stage victory in Germany.

==== 2015: Second full WRC season ====
Evans and Barritt continued to partner for the 2015 season. The crew scored two podiums, finishing seventh in the overall standings. Their best result was second in Corsica, with 43.10 seconds behind rally winner Jari-Matti Latvala after losing the lead on Saturday's final stage.

==== 2016: Demotion to WRC-2 and British Rally Championship title ====
In November 2015, M-Sport announced its decision to drop Evans to WRC-2 and replace him with French driver Eric Camilli. Teaming up with co-driver Craig Parry in a Ford Fiesta R5, Evans scored three wins at Monte Carlo, Sweden and Tour de Corse, placing second in the WRC-2 Driver's Championship. He also contested the 2016 British Rally Championship in a DMACK-backed crew with Max Vatanen, driving the Ford Fiesta R5. Having won five out of seven races, Evans was eventually crowned the BRC champion.

==== 2017: Return to M-Sport and first home victory ====
Final Donut; Llandudno, October 2017

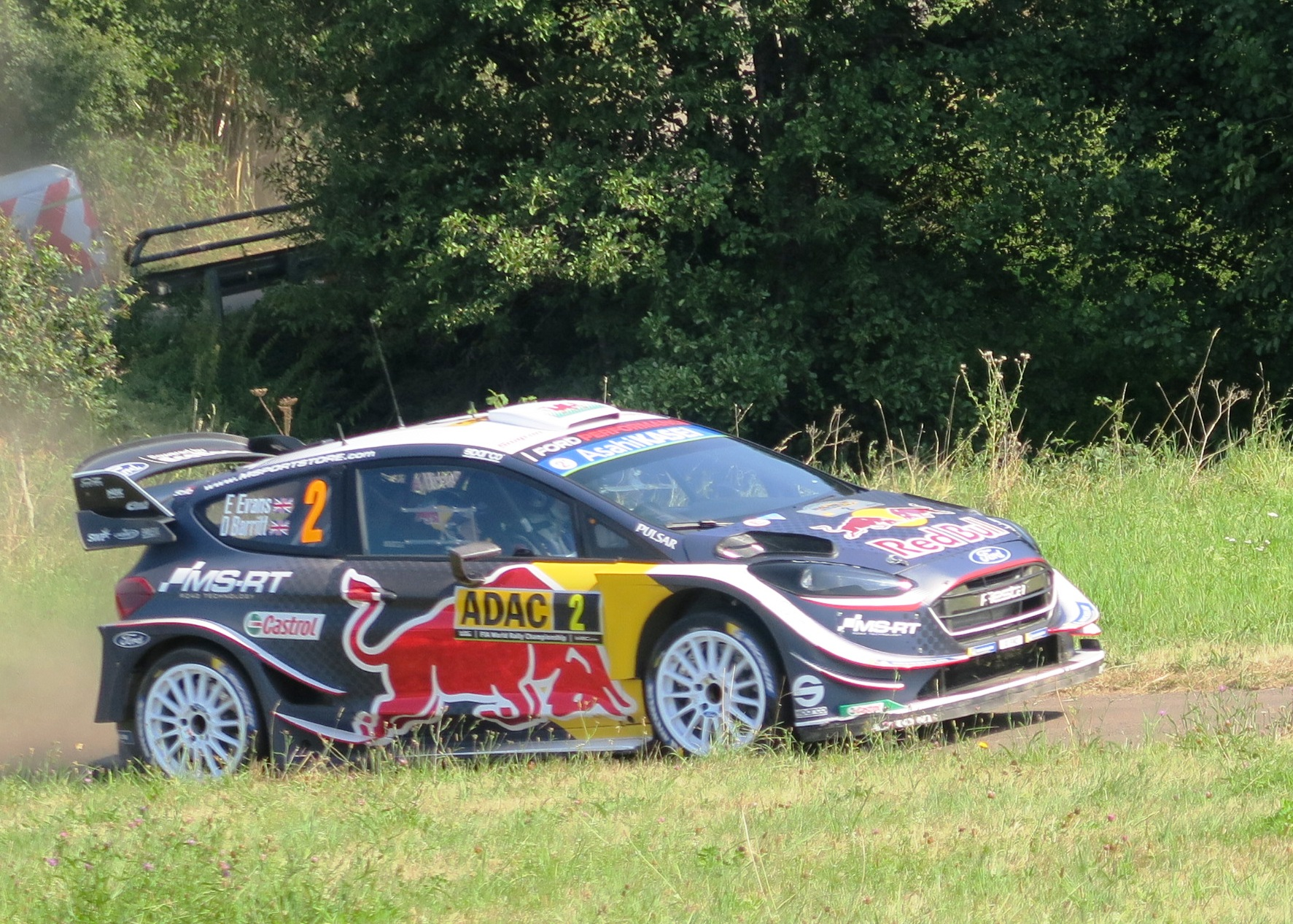
Elfyn Evans and Daniel Barritt in their Ford Fiesta WRC for the 2018 Rallye Deutschland

For 2017, Elfyn rejoined the M-Sport World Rally Team to drive the DMACK car. He started the year with sixth in Monte Carlo, setting several fastest stage times, and then repeated the performance in Sweden. After two disappointing rounds in Mexico and Corsica, at round five in Argentina, Evans benefited from misfortune for his rivals to end day one with a minute's lead. On day two, Evans struggled with punctures, a spin and a damaged diffuser, and saw his lead fall to just 11 seconds. On the final stage, it was a straight battle between him and Hyundai driver Thierry Neuville. He pushed early in the stage, but lost several seconds when he hit a bridge. He tried hard to make up the lost time, but in the end he lost his first victory by just 0.7 seconds to Neuville. In Finland, Evans was left to uphold team honors after a crash for teammate Sébastien Ogier and a puncture for Ott Tänak. He dutifully set consistent top three stage times and snatched second place on the last stage from Juho Hänninen, in what many journalists described as the best drive of his career so far. At the penultimate round on his home rally in Wales, Evans took advantage of his DMACK tyres, which were widely suited to the conditions, to take his first WRC victory, the first for a Welsh driver, and the first for a British driver on Wales Rally GB since the late Richard Burns in 2000. He went on to finish the championship in fifth place.

=== Toyota Gazoo Racing (2020–present) ===
==== 2020 ====
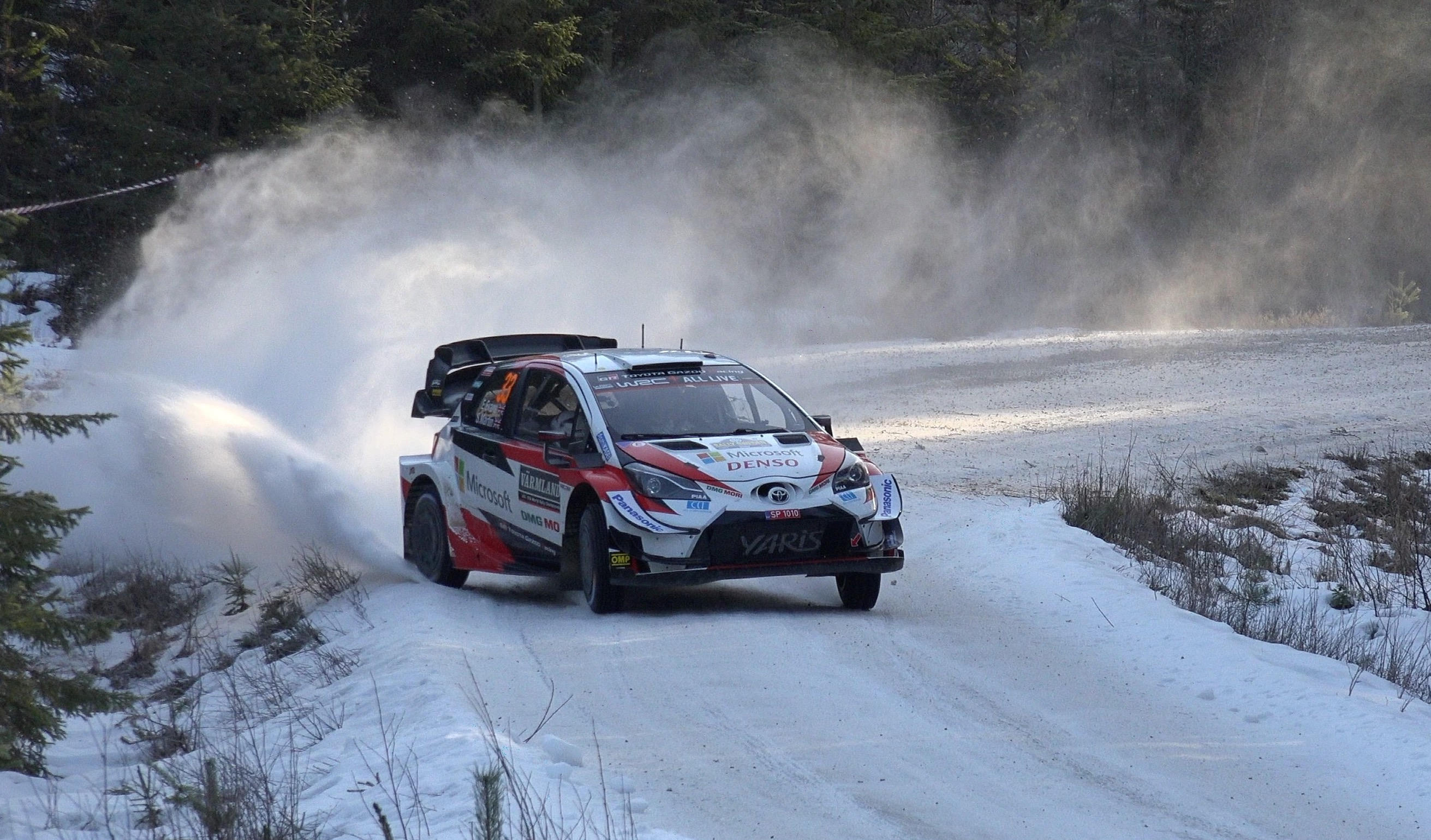
Evans on his way to victory at the 2020 Rally Sweden

Evans would later repeat the success he found in Wales with a second career victory in the 2020 Rally Sweden, during his first season with Toyota Gazoo Racing WRT, where he led the rally despite adverse weather conditions which forced the organisers to abridge the event to just nine stages. This marked his first win in Sweden, his first rally win for Toyota, and the first British driver to win the event. His victory in Sweden also allowed him to lead the points standings in the WRC driver's championship for the first time in his career. He eventually finished the year in second position in the Covid-abbreviated championship, helped by a second rally win of the season in the 2020 Rally Turkey. He finished the season eight points behind champion Sébastien Ogier, and nine points ahead of Ott Tänak, who finished third.

==== 2021 ====
During the 2021 World Rally Championship, his second season with Toyota, Evans won two further WRC events, in Portugal and Finland, and finished in second position in five others. He remained in contention for the title until the final rally of the season, but finished that event in second position to championship winner and Toyota teammate Ogier with only a 0.6-second time difference. For the second year in a row, Evans finished the championship in second position, 23 points behind Ogier and 31 points ahead of third-placed Thierry Neuville.

==== 2022 ====
During the 2022 World Rally Championship, his third season with Toyota, teammate Kalle Rovanperä secured the drivers' championship title. Evans did not secure any wins this season, but with four podium finishes, ended the championship in fourth position. Evans contributed his dry spell in 2022 to not adapting to the new hybrid cars introduced at the start of the season, admitting others adapted better, but he was determined to improve for the 2023 season with hopes to challenge for the title.

==== 2023 ====
The 2023 World Rally Championship saw a return to glory for Evans, securing three rally wins, in Croatia Rally, Rally Finland and Rally Japan, in order to secure the runner-up spot behind teammate and championship winner Kalle Rovanperä.

==== 2024 ====
The 2024 World Rally Championship saw Evans pick-up another runners-up spot, behind Thierry Neuville who had just secured his first drivers championship, Evans took his first and only win of the season in the closing round at 2024 Rally Japan taking the championship runner-up spot away from Ott Tänak who retired. This marked Evans fourth time as the WRC drivers' championship runner-up.

==== 2025 ====
The 2025 World Rally Championship brought on new regulations that removed the hybrid systems that had only just been introduced in 2022. This was a change that Evans had previously attributed to a slump in form; he had previously excelled with the non-hybrid Toyotas of 2020 and 2021, mounting championship battles with eight-time World Rally Champion Sebastian Ogier in both years, which proved a positive outlook for Evans's possible championship challenge for the 2025 season. Evans went on to lead the championship for majority of the season, seeing his lead whittled away by Sebastian Ogier, who clinched the title at the final event in Saudi Arabia. He finished runner up in the standings for the fifth time.

==== 2026: First World Rally Championship title ====
Evans was officially announced as a driver for the 2026 World Rally Championship season on 10 November 2025. Toyota remained the car to beat in 2026 but Evans faced serious competition in new teammate Oliver Solberg, who replaced Kalle Rovanperä, being a main contender for the World Championship in his first full season for Toyota in Rally 1. Evans put up a strong effort in the first half of the 2026 season, with five podiums and two wins.

After Oliver Solberg went off the road on the final stage of the 2026 Rally Italia Sardegna, Evans was declared the 2026 World Rally Champion.

== WRC victories ==
#	Event	Season	Co-driver	Car
1	(United Kingdom) 73. Dayinsure Wales Rally GB 2017	2017	(United Kingdom) Daniel Barritt	Ford Fiesta WRC
2	68th Rally Sweden	2020	(United Kingdom) Scott Martin	Toyota Yaris WRC
3	13. Marmaris Rally of Turkey	2020	(United Kingdom) Scott Martin	Toyota Yaris WRC
4	54° Rally de Portugal	2021	(United Kingdom) Scott Martin	Toyota Yaris WRC
5	70th Rally Finland	2021	(United Kingdom) Scott Martin	Toyota Yaris WRC
6	47th Croatia Rally	2023	(United Kingdom) Scott Martin	Toyota GR Yaris Rally1
7	72nd Rally Finland	2023	(United Kingdom) Scott Martin	Toyota GR Yaris Rally1
8	8th Rally Japan	2023	(United Kingdom) Scott Martin	Toyota GR Yaris Rally1
9	9th Rally Japan	2024	(United Kingdom) Scott Martin	Toyota GR Yaris Rally1
10	72nd Rally Sweden	2025	(United Kingdom) Scott Martin	Toyota GR Yaris Rally1
11	(Kenya) 73rd Safari Rally	2025	(United Kingdom) Scott Martin	Toyota GR Yaris Rally1
12	73rd Rally Sweden	2026	(United Kingdom) Scott Martin	Toyota GR Yaris Rally1
13	11th Rally Japan	2026	(United Kingdom) Scott Martin	Toyota GR Yaris Rally1

== Results ==
=== WRC results ===
Year	Entrant	Car	1	2	3	4	5	6	7	8	9	10	11	12	13	14	15	16	Pos.	Points
2007	Elfyn Evans	Ford Fiesta ST	MON	SWE	NOR	MEX	POR	ARG	ITA	GRE	FIN	GER	NZL	ESP	FRA	JPN	IRE	GBR; 42	NC	0
2011	Elfyn Evans	Ford Fiesta R2	SWE	MEX	POR	JOR	ITA	ARG	GRE	FIN; Ret	GER	AUS	FRA; 16	ESP	GBR; Ret				NC	0
2013	Qatar M-Sport WRT	Ford Fiesta RRC	MON	SWE	MEX	POR; 23	ARG	GRE											12th	20
2013	Qatar M-Sport WRT	Ford Fiesta RS WRC							ITA; 6										12th	20
2013	Qatar M-Sport WRT	Ford Fiesta R5								FIN; Ret	GER; 6	AUS	FRA; 11	ESP; Ret	GBR; 8				12th	20
2014	M-Sport WRT	Ford Fiesta RS WRC	MON; 6	SWE; Ret	MEX; 4	POR; 22	ARG; 7	ITA; 5	POL; 35	FIN; 7	GER; 4	AUS; 8	FRA; 6	ESP; 14	GBR; 5				8th	81
2015	M-Sport WRT	Ford Fiesta RS WRC	MON; 7	SWE; 6	MEX; 4	ARG; 3	POR; 64	ITA; 4	POL; Ret	FIN; 12	GER; 6	AUS; 9	FRA; 2	ESP; 34	GBR; 6				7th	89
2016	M-Sport WRT	Ford Fiesta R5	MON; 8	SWE; 9	MEX	ARG; 17	POR; 30	ITA	POL; 13	FIN; 11	GER	CHN; C	FRA; 11	ESP	GBR; WD	AUS			21st	6
2017	M-Sport WRT	Ford Fiesta WRC	MON; 6	SWE; 6	MEX; 9	FRA; 21	ARG; 2	POR; 6	ITA; Ret	POL; 8	FIN; 2	GER; 6	ESP; 7	GBR; 1	AUS; 5				5th	128
2018	M-Sport Ford WRT	Ford Fiesta WRC	MON; 6	SWE; 14	MEX; Ret	FRA; 5	ARG; 6	POR; 2	ITA; 14	FIN; 7	GER; 25	TUR; 12	GBR; 20	ESP; 3	AUS; 6				7th	80
2019	M-Sport Ford WRT	Ford Fiesta WRC	MON; Ret	SWE; 5	MEX; 3	FRA; 3	ARG; Ret	CHL; 4	POR; 5	ITA; 4	FIN; WD	GER	TUR; WD	GBR; 5	ESP; 6	AUS; C			5th	102
2020	Toyota Gazoo Racing WRT	Toyota Yaris WRC	MON; 3	SWE; 1	MEX; 4	EST; 4	TUR; 1	ITA; 4	MNZ; 29										2nd	114
2021	Toyota Gazoo Racing WRT	Toyota Yaris WRC	MON; 2	ARC; 5	CRO; 2	POR; 1	ITA; 2	KEN; 10	EST; 5	BEL; 4	GRE; 6	FIN; 1	ESP; 2	MNZ; 2					2nd	207
2022	Toyota Gazoo Racing WRT	Toyota GR Yaris Rally1	MON; 21	SWE; Ret	CRO; 5	POR; 2	ITA; 40	KEN; 2	EST; 2	FIN; 4	BEL; 2	GRE; Ret	NZL; Ret	ESP; 6	JPN; 5				4th	134
2023	Toyota Gazoo Racing WRT	Toyota GR Yaris Rally1	MON; 4	SWE; 5	MEX; 3	CRO; 1	POR; Ret	ITA; 4	KEN; 3	EST; 4	FIN; 1	GRE; 2	CHL; 3	EUR; 31	JPN; 1				2nd	216
2024	Toyota Gazoo Racing WRT	Toyota GR Yaris Rally1	MON; 3	SWE; 2	KEN; 4	CRO; 2	POR; 6	ITA; 4	POL; 2	LAT; 5	FIN; Ret	GRE; 18	CHL; 2	EUR; 2	JPN; 1				2nd	210
2025	Toyota Gazoo Racing WRT	Toyota GR Yaris Rally1	MON; 2	SWE; 1	KEN; 1	ESP; 3	POR; 6	ITA; 4	GRE; 4	EST; 6	FIN; 4	PAR; 2	CHL; 2	EUR; 2	JPN; 2	SAU; 6			2nd	289
2026	Toyota Gazoo Racing WRT	Toyota GR Yaris Rally1	MON; 2	SWE; 1	KEN; 13	CRO; 34	ESP; 2	POR; 3	JPN; 1	GRE; 5	EST; 6	FIN; 3	PAR; 2	CHL; 5	ITA; 5				1st	243

* Season still in progress.

=== WRC Academy results ===
Year	Entrant	Car	1	2	3	4	5	6	Pos.	Points
2012	Elfyn Evans	Ford Fiesta R2	POR; 7	GRE; 1	FIN; 1	GER; 1	FRA; 1	ESP; 3	1st	144

=== WRC-2 results ===
Year	Entrant	Car	1	2	3	4	5	6	7	8	9	10	11	12	13	14	Pos.	Points
2013	Qatar M-Sport World Rally Team	Ford Fiesta RRC	MON	SWE	MEX	POR; 8	ARG	GRE	ITA								7th	65
2013	Qatar M-Sport World Rally Team	Ford Fiesta R5								FIN; Ret	GER; 2	AUS	FRA; 2	ESP; Ret	GBR; 1		7th	65
2016	M-Sport	Ford Fiesta R5	MON; 1	SWE; 1	MEX	ARG; 4	POR; 14	ITA	POL; 2	FIN; 3	GER	CHN; C	FRA; 1	ESP	GBR	AUS	2nd	120

=== ERC results ===
Year	Entrant	Car	1	2	3	4	5	6	7	8	9	10	Pos	Points
2016	DMACK British Rally Team	Ford Fiesta R5	CAN	IRE; Ret	GRE	AZO	YPR	EST	POL	ZLI	LIE	CYP	NC	0

Sporting positions
Preceded by Sébastien Ogier	World Rally Champion; 2026	Succeeded by Incumbent
Awards
Preceded by Ott Tänak	Autosport; International Rally Driver Award; 2020	Succeeded by Sébastien Ogier
