= Patrik Flodin =

Swedish rally driver

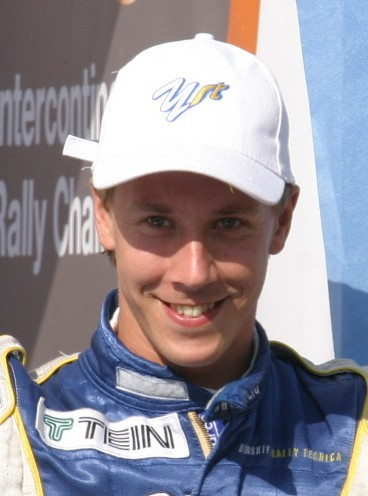
- Flodin at the 2009 Rally Russia

Personal information
- Nationality: (Sweden) Swedish
- Born: 16 August 1984 (age 42); Ilsbo, Sweden

World Rally Championship record
- Years active: 2005–2011, 2019
- Co-driver: (Sweden) Morgan Olsson (Sweden) Maria Andersson (Sweden) Göran Bergsten (Finland) Timo Alanne
- Rallies: 41
- Championships: 0
- Rally wins: 0
- Podiums: 0
- Stage wins: 0
- Total points: 1
- First rally: 2005 Rally Sweden
- Last rally: 2019 Rally Finland

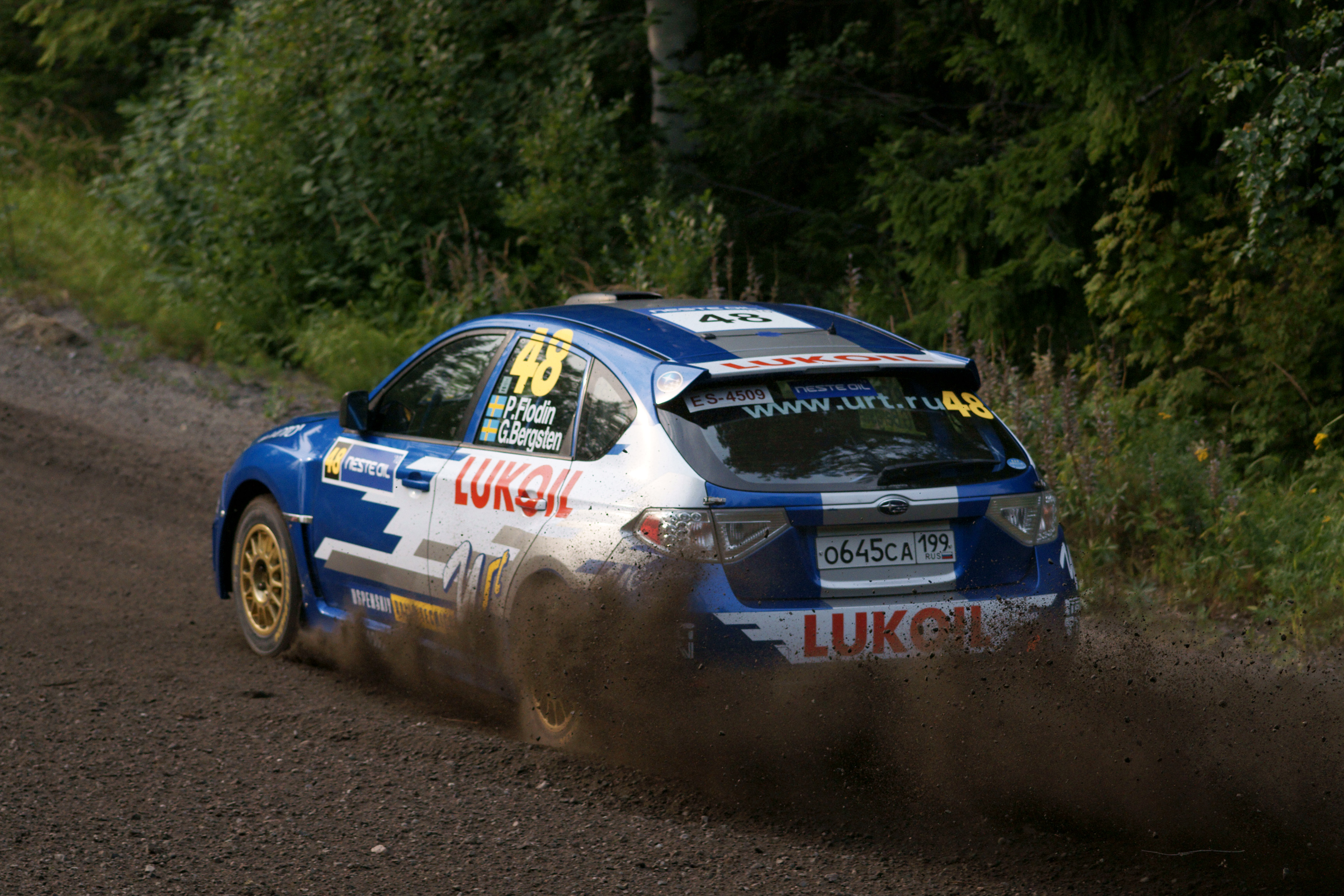
Flodin at the 2010 Finland Rally

Patrik Flodin (born 16 August 1984) is a rally driver from Sweden. Flodin won the Swedish Championship in 2006. In 2009, Flodin contested in the Production World Rally Championship (PWRC) with the Uspenskiy Rally Tecnica (URT) team, driving a Subaru Impreza. He also became the 2009 Russian Rally Champion. In Sardinia 2011, he drove a Mini Countryman WRC.

== WRC results ==
Year	Entrant	Car	1	2	3	4	5	6	7	8	9	10	11	12	13	14	15	16	Pos	Points
2005	Patrik Flodin	Mitsubishi Lancer Evo VII	MON	SWE; 36	MEX	NZL	ITA	CYP	TUR	GRE	ARG	FIN; 25	GER	GBR; Ret	JPN	FRA	ESP	AUS	-	0
2006	Patrik Flodin	Subaru Impreza WRX STi	MON	SWE; Ret	MEX	ESP	FRA	ARG	ITA	GRE	GER	FIN; 12	JPN	CYP	TUR	AUS	NZL	GBR; 14	-	0
2007	Rally Team Olsbergs	Subaru Impreza WRC	MON	SWE; 11															-	0
2007	Rally Team Olsbergs	Subaru Impreza WRX STi						ARG; 29	ITA	GRE; Ret			NZL; Ret			JPN; 21	IRE; Ret	GBR; Ret	-	0
2007	Patrik Flodin	Subaru Impreza WRX STi			NOR; 11	MEX	POR; 16				FIN; 15	GER		ESP; 43	FRA				-	0
2008	Subaru Swedish Dealer Team	Subaru Impreza WRX STi	MON	SWE; 39	MEX	ARG	JOR	ITA	GRE	TUR									-	0
2008	Orion World Rally Team	Mitsubishi Lancer Evo IX									FIN; EX	GER	NZL	ESP	FRA	JPN			-	0
2008	Gaboko Racing	Subaru Impreza WRX STi															GBR; 11		-	0
2009	Uspenskiy Rally Tecnica	Subaru Impreza WRX STi	IRE	NOR; 25	CYP	POR; Ret	ARG	ITA; 16	GRE; 19	POL	FIN; 13	AUS	ESP	GBR; 20					-	0
2010	Uspenskiy Rally Tecnica	Subaru Impreza WRX STi	SWE; 18	MEX	JOR; 11	TUR	NZL	POR	BUL	FIN; Ret	GER; 20	JPN; 11	FRA	ESP	GBR; 22				-	0
2011	Uspenskiy Rally Tecnica	Subaru Impreza WRX STi	SWE; EX	MEX	POR; 29	JOR		ARG; 10	GRE	FIN; 22		AUS	FRA	ESP; 21	GBR; 14				29th	1
2011	Grifone	Mini John Cooper Works WRC					ITA; 19				GER; 27								29th	1
2019	Printsport	Škoda Fabia R5	MON	SWE; 22	MEX	FRA	ARG	CHL	POR	ITA	FIN; Ret	GER	TUR	GBR	ESP	AUS; C			NC	0

=== PWRC results ===
Year	Entrant	Car	1	2	3	4	5	6	7	8	9	WDC	Points
2007	Rally Team Olsbergs	Subaru Impreza WRX STi	MON	SWE	ARG; 13	GRE; Ret	NZL; Ret	JPN; 6	IRE; Ret	GBR; Ret		25th	3
2008	Subaru Swedish Dealer Team	Subaru Impreza WRX STi	SWE; 16	ARG	GRE	TUR						10th	10
2008	Orion World Rally Team	Mitsubishi Lancer Evo IX					FIN; EX	NZL	JPN			10th	10
2008	Gaboko Racing	Subaru Impreza WRX STi								GBR; 1		10th	10
2009	Uspenskiy Rally Tecnica	Subaru Impreza WRX STi	NOR; 7	CYP								7th	12
2009	Uspenskiy Rally Tecnica	Subaru Impreza STi N14			POR; Ret	ARG	ITA; 4	GRE; 7	AUS	GBR; 6		7th	12
2010	Patrik Flodin	Subaru Impreza WRX STi	SWE; 1	MEX								2nd	100
2010	Uspenskiy Rally Tecnica	Subaru Impreza WRX STi			JOR; 1	NZL	FIN; Ret	GER; 3	JPN; 1	FRA	GBR; 5	2nd	100
2011	Uspenskiy Rally Tecnica	Subaru Impreza WRX STi	SWE; EX	POR; 10	ARG; 2	FIN; 3	AUS	ESP; 1	GBR; 1			2nd	84

=== WRC-2 results ===
Year	Entrant	Car	1	2	3	4	5	6	7	8	9	10	11	12	13	14	WDC	Points
2019	Printsport	Škoda Fabia R5	MON	SWE; 8	MEX	FRA	ARG	CHL	POR	ITA	FIN	GER	TUR	GBR	ESP	AUS; C	40th	4
