= Munchi's Ford World Rally Team =

2007-2011 rallying team participating in the World Rally Championship for Manufacturers

Munchi's World Rally Team
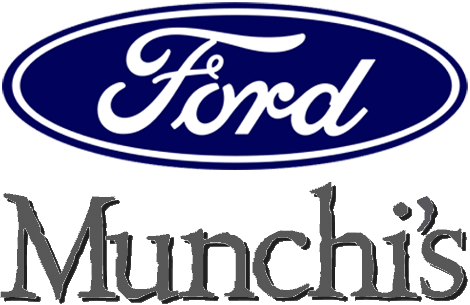
- Full name: Munchi's Ford World Rally Team
- Base: Cumbria, England, United Kingdom
- Team principal(s): Martin Christie
- Drivers: (Argentina) Federico Villagra
- Co-drivers: (Argentina) Jorge Pérez Companc
- Chassis: Ford Fiesta RS WRC
- Tyres: Michelin

World Rally Championship history
- Debut: 2007 Swedish Rally
- Last event: 2011 Rally Catalunya
- Manufacturers' Championships: 0
- Drivers' Championships: 0
- Rally wins: 0

The Munchi's Ford World Rally Team was a private team competing in the World Rally Championship, founded by rally driver Luís Pérez Companc, son of Argentine entrepreneur Gregorio Pérez Companc, also a car enthusiast and collector.

The team made its debut in the 2007 Swedish Rally. The cars were prepared and run by the Cumbria based M-Sport operation and Martin Christie is the team principal.

== History ==
=== 2007 season ===
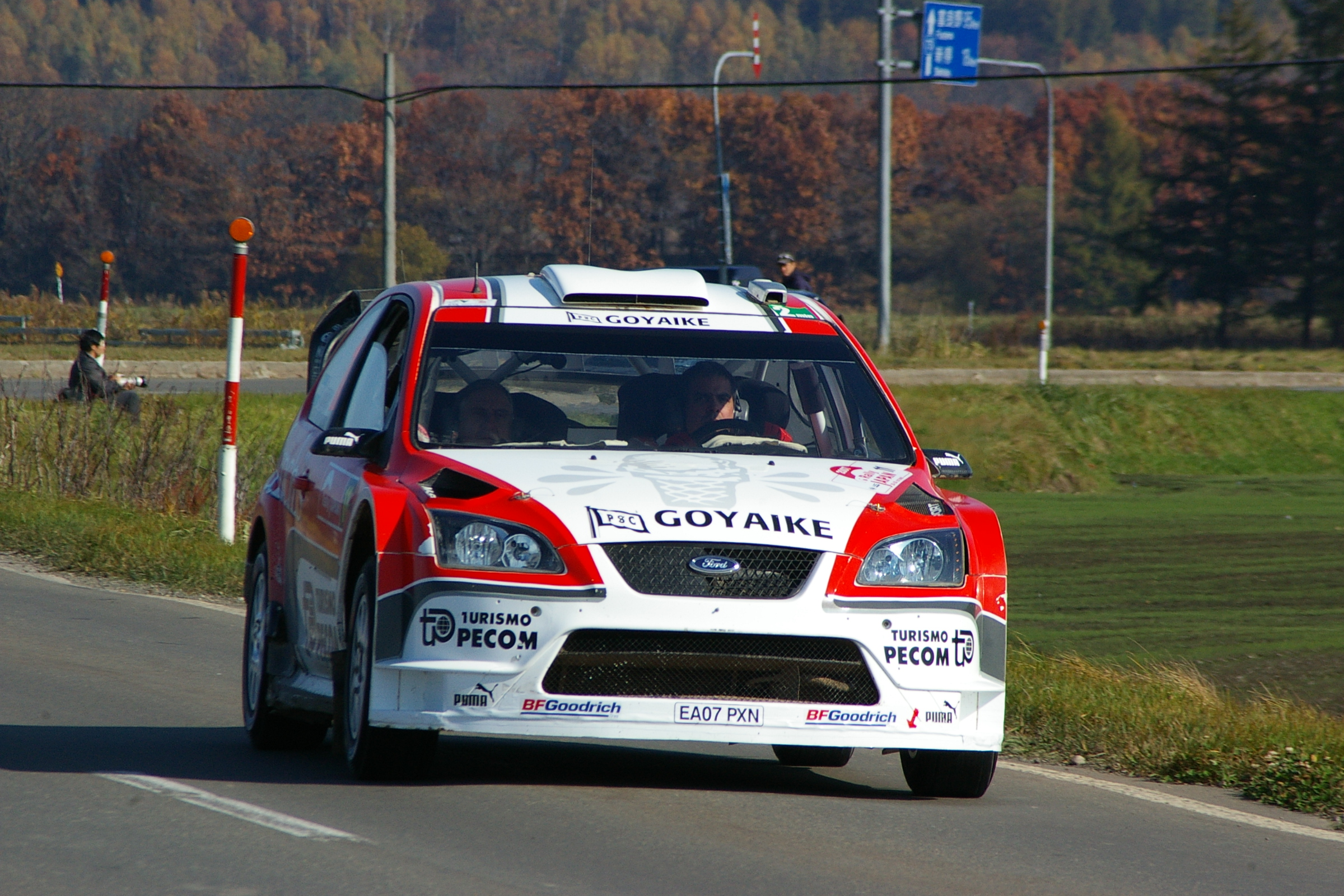
Companc driving on a road section of the 2007 Rally Japan

The Munchi's Ford World Rally Team was founded by Argentine rally driver Luís Pérez Companc, using the name of his family's ice cream parlor chain, Munchi's (which name had been taken from the nickname of María Sundblad, Pérez Companc's wife). The team competed in the World Rally Championship in 2007 for ten rounds. The drivers who started the season for the team at the Rally Sweden were Pérez Companc and Juan Pablo Raies. Companc finished the rally in 15th, but his teammate Raies retired before the start of the event. Despite scoring eight points, Raies was replaced by Federico Villagra halfway through the season in Italy. Villagra would go on to score just two points. The best result for the team came at the 2007 Rally Japan when Companc and Villagra finished fifth and seventh respectively, scoring six points for the team. The team finished last in the constructors' championship with 14 points. However, the initial season for the team was simply to familiarise themselves with the series and the car.

=== 2008 season ===
For the 2008 season the team contested ten rounds. Federico Villagra drove all ten rounds for the team, while Luís Pérez Companc, who also began driving in the FIA GT Championship in 2008, shared the second car with Stobart Ford regular Henning Solberg, Aris Vovos and Barry Clark, the reigning Fiesta Sporting Trophy International champion, who contested 3 rounds of the championship for the team.

=== 2009 season ===
With a healthy amount of experience under their belts and the competitiveness of the Ford Focus RS WRC, the Argentinean duo of Villagra and Companc gathered a strong haul of 23 points in the 2009 season. They also had their best WRC finishes, finishing Acropolis Rally and Rally Argentina in fourth position overall.

=== 2010 season ===
For the 2010 season the team took part in 8 rounds out of 13. Federico Villagra drove the 8 rounds with various co-drivers in Ford Focus RS WRC 08 car. At the end of season, the team scored 58 points and ranked 5 of the Manufacturers' championship. Villagra scored 36 points and finished 9th in Drivers' Championship.

=== 2011 season ===
It was announced that Federico Villagra is going to continue in 2011 with Ford. Currently with Ford Fiesta RS WRC.

== WRC results ==
Year	Car	No	Driver	1	2	3	4	5	6	7	8	9	10	11	12	13	14	15	16	WDC	Points	TC	Points
2007	Ford Focus RS WRC 06	11	(Argentina) Luís Pérez Companc	MON	SWE; 15	NOR	MEX; 19	POR; DNS	ARG; 28	ITA; Ret	GRE; 11	FIN; 11	GER	NZL; 23	ESP; Ret	FRA	JPN; 5	IRE	GBR; Ret	16th	4	6th	14
2007	Ford Focus RS WRC 06	12	(Argentina) Juan Pablo Raies	MON	SWE; EX	NOR	MEX; 12	POR	ARG; 12											-	0	6th	14
2007	Ford Focus RS WRC 06	12	(Argentina) Federico Villagra							ITA; 11	GRE; 32	FIN; 14	GER	NZL; 11	ESP; 13	FRA	JPN; 7	IRE	GBR; 18	20th	2	6th	14
2008	Ford Focus RS WRC 07	9	(Argentina) Federico Villagra	MON	SWE	MEX; 7	ARG; 6	JOR; 6	ITA; 14	GRE; 13	TUR; 9	FIN; Ret	GER	NZL; 8	ESP; 12	FRA	JPN; 9	GBR		14th	9	6th	22
2008	Ford Focus RS WRC 07	10	(Norway) Henning Solberg	MON	SWE	MEX; 5			ITA; 7				GER	NZL; 9	ESP; 11	FRA	JPN; Ret	GBR		8th*	22*	6th	22
2008	Ford Focus RS WRC 07	10	(Argentina) Luís Pérez Companc				ARG; Ret					FIN; Ret								-	0	6th	22
2008	Ford Focus RS WRC 07	10	(Greece) Armodios Vovos							GRE; Ret										-	0	6th	22
2008	Ford Focus RS WRC 07	10	(United Kingdom) Barry Clark					JOR; 12			TUR; 10									-	0	6th	22
2009	Ford Focus RS WRC 08	9	(Argentina) Federico Villagra	IRE	NOR	CYP; 7	POR; 7	ARG; 4	ITA; Ret	GRE; 4	POL	FIN; 11	AUS; 8	ESP; 8	GBR					9th	16	5th	23
2009	Ford Focus RS WRC 08	10	(Finland) Matti Rantanen	IRE	NOR	CYP	POR	ARG	ITA	GRE	POL	FIN; 5	AUS	ESP	GBR					15th	4	5th	23
2009	Ford Focus RS WRC 08	72	(Finland) Mattias Therman	IRE	NOR	CYP	POR	ARG	ITA	GRE	POL	FIN; 15	AUS	ESP	GBR					-	0	5th	23
2010	Ford Focus RS WRC 08	9	(Argentina) Federico Villagra	SWE	MEX; 7	JOR; 7	TUR; 6	NZL; 9	POR; 8	BUL	FIN	DEU	JPN; 8	FRA; 7	ESP; 15	GBR				9th	36	5th	58
2011	Ford Fiesta RS WRC	7	(Argentina) Federico Villagra	SWE	MEX; 9	POR; 8	JOR; 7	ITA; 17	ARG; 6	GRE; Ret	FIN	DEU	AUS	FRA	ESP; 16	GBR				13th	20	7th	38

== Gallery ==
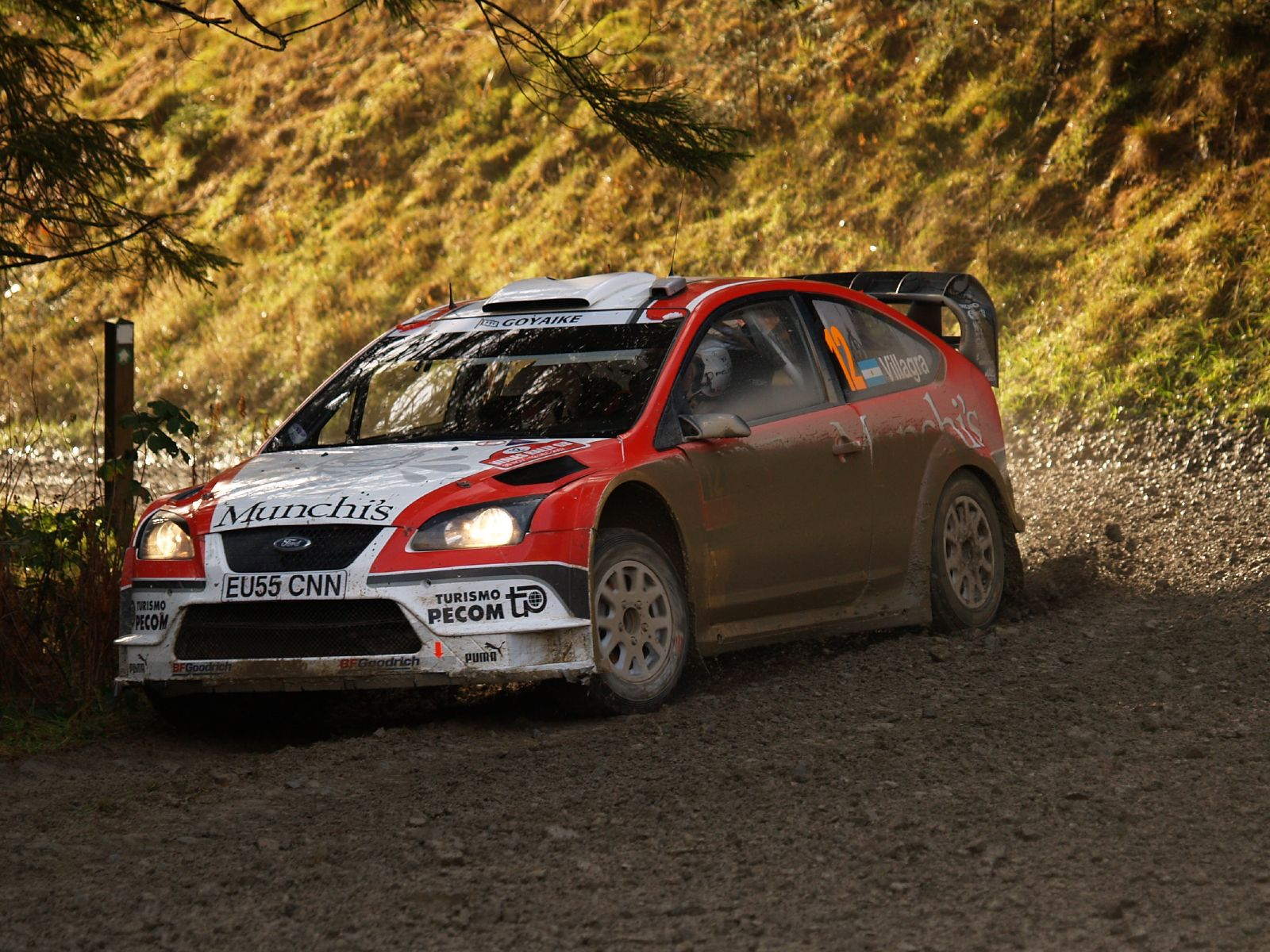
Federico Villagra at the 2007 Wales Rally GB

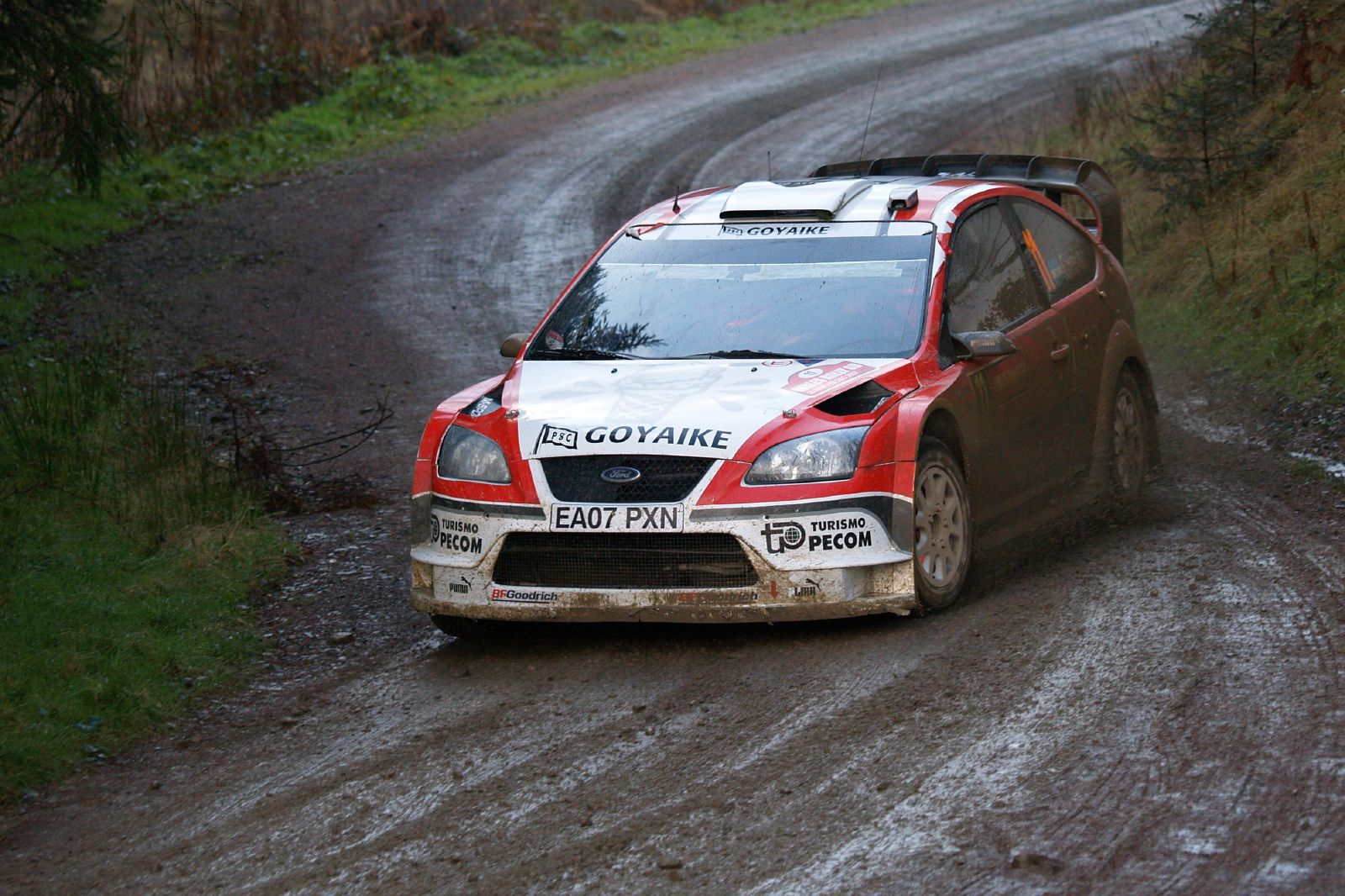
Luis Pérez Companc at the 2007 Wales Rally GB

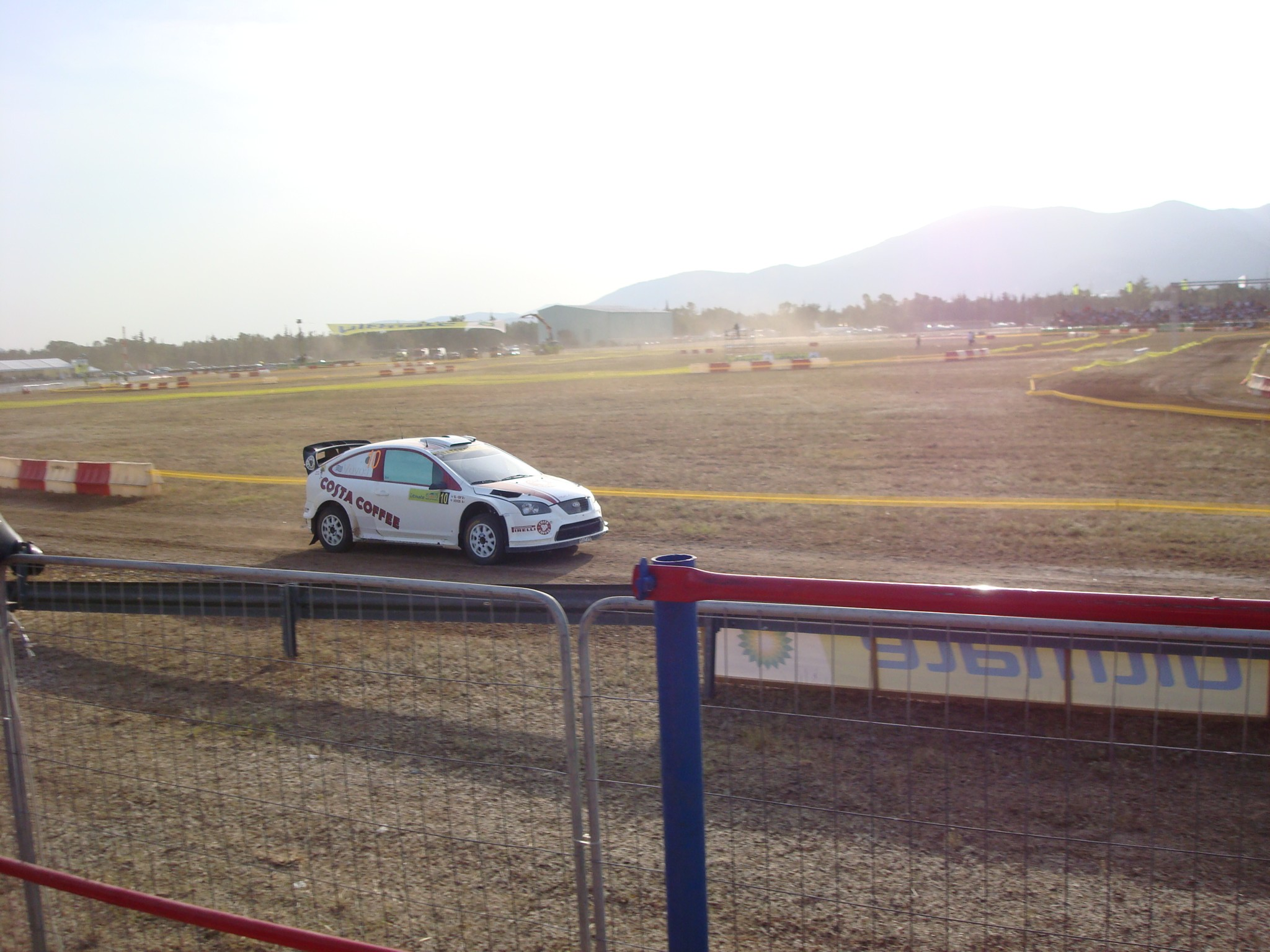
Aris Vovos at the 2008 Rally of Greece

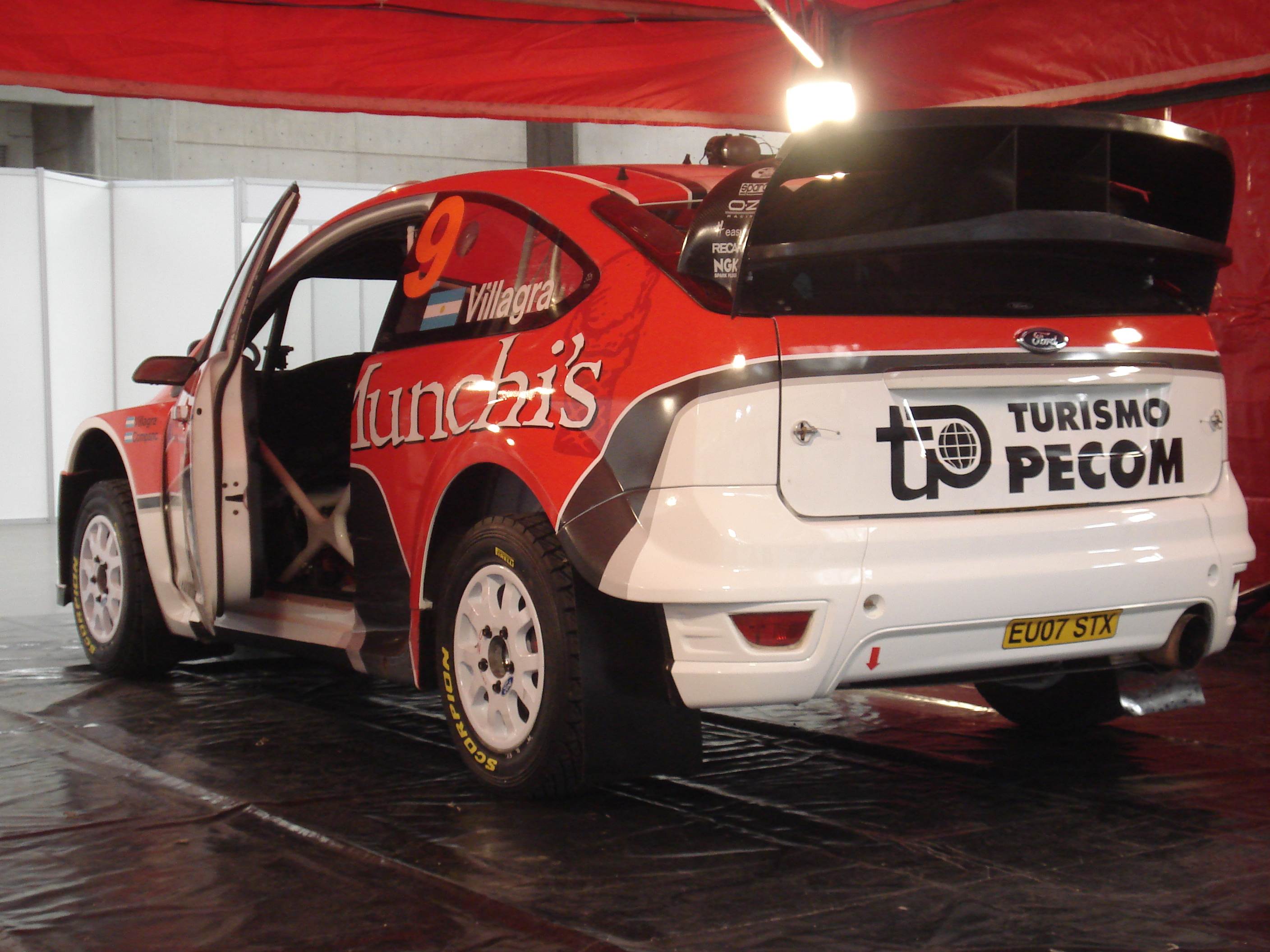
Federico Villagra at the 2008 Rally Argentina

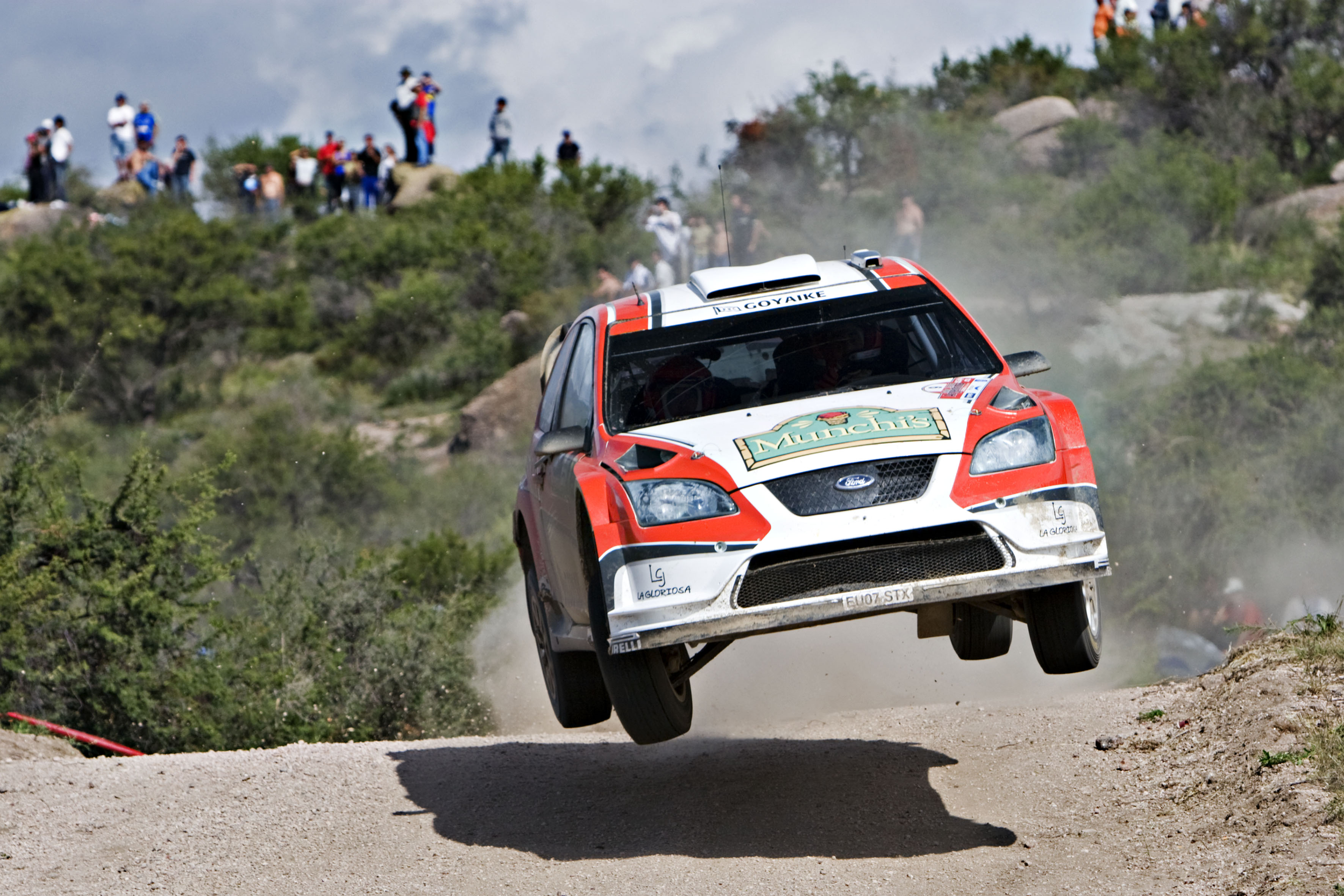
Federico Villagra at the 2008 Rally Argentina

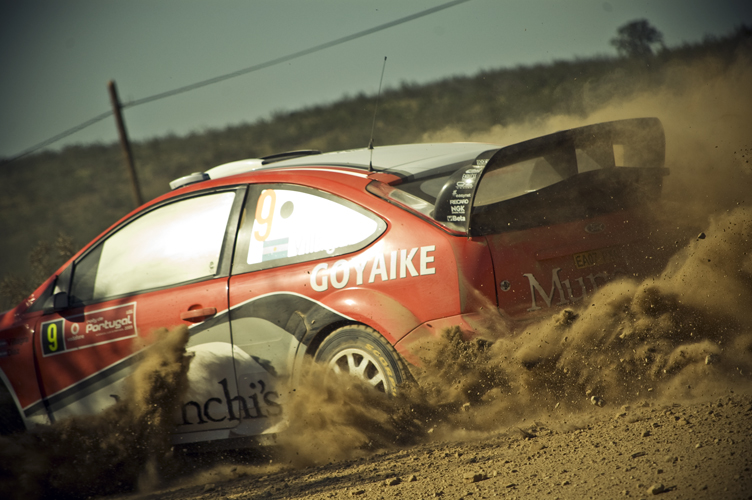
Federico Villagra at the 2009 Rally de Portugal

== See also ==
- M-Sport World Rally Team
- Ford World Rally Team
