= 2010 Rally México =

Corona Rally México Rally Guanajuato Bicentenario
Round 2 of the 2010 World Rally Championship
← Previous event	Next event →
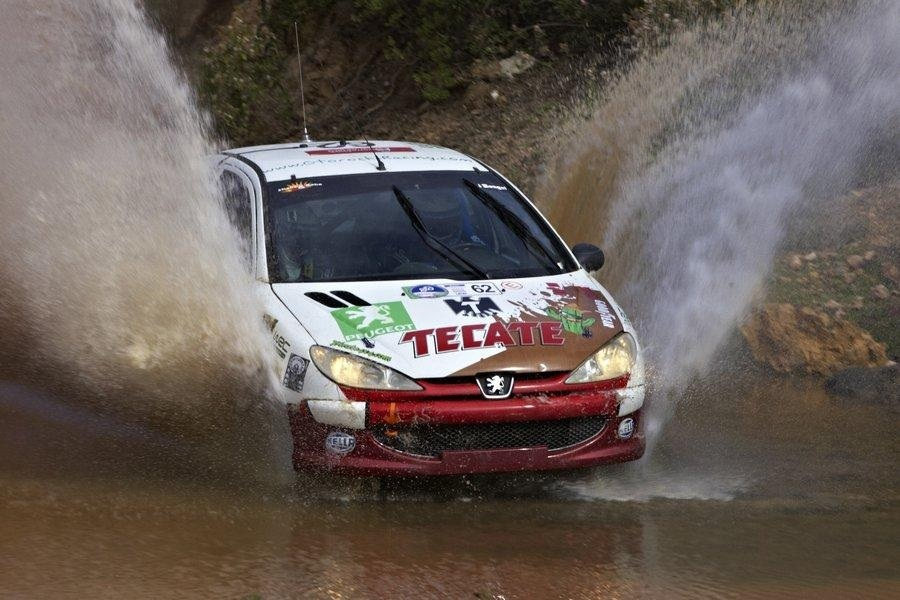
- Host country: Mexico
- Rally base: León, Mexico
- Dates run: March 5 – 7, 2010
- Stages: 22 (354.60 km; 220.34 miles)
- Stage surface: Gravel
- Overall distance: 884.58 km (549.65 miles)

Statistics
- Crews: 30 at start, 25 at finish

Overall results
- Overall winner: (France) Sébastien Loeb (France) Citroën Total World Rally Team

The 2010 Rally México was the 23rd Rally Mexico and the second round of the 2010 World Rally Championship season. The rally took place over March 5–7, and was based in León, in the Guanajuato region of the country. The event was part of the celebrations of the 100th anniversary of the Mexican Revolution and the 200th anniversary of its independence. The rally was also the second round of both the Production Car World Rally Championship and the Super 2000 World Rally Championship.

The stages of the rally mixed mountain peaks with flat open valleys. Due to the high altitude, engines struggle to breathe in the thin air, causing a twenty percent reduction in their output. Stage 20 of the rally — Sauz Seco — was cancelled prior to the event, on safety grounds.

Sébastien Loeb took his 55th career rally victory, leading from the end of the eleventh stage onwards. Loeb won by just over 24 seconds from another Citroën driver, Petter Solberg. Solberg had led the rally throughout the first leg, and only took second position on the final stage through the super special stage. Solberg's gain was Sébastien Ogier's loss, as the Citroën junior driver just missed out on equalling his best career result in the World Rally Championship. Solberg overturned a 0.6-second gap over the final 4.42 km (2.75 mi), taking Ogier by 1.1 seconds.

In the SWRC event, Xavier Pons took the victory after battling Martin Prokop throughout the event. In the end, the Spanish driver took victory by just seventeen seconds, as both finished inside the overall top ten, in eighth and ninth places respectively. Prokop moved into the championship lead with a second to go with his third in Sweden. Michał Kościuszko was third, but over half an hour behind Pons and Prokop, with Eyvind Brynildsen and Albert Llovera rounding out the class finishers.

In the PWRC, Armindo Araújo took victory by over three minutes from Toshi Arai. Miguel Baldoni, Benito Guerra and Gianluca Linari were the only other finishers. With Patrik Flodin absent, Araújo moved into a 15-point championship lead.

The rally also ran an event/class named "Rally America" which allowed cars legal in the similarly named but unrelated Rally America series to run on the same stages as the WRC cars. The 2010 event was notable for the participation of amateur driver Bill Caswell who drove a 1991 BMW 318i he bought for $500 over Craigslist alongside co-driver Ben Slocum to 3rd place in the class, much to the amusement of the other drivers.

== Results ==
=== Event standings ===
Pos.	Driver	Co-driver	Car	Time	Difference	Points
Overall
1.	(France) Sébastien Loeb	(Monaco) Daniel Elena	Citroën C4 WRC	3:42:41.7	0.0	25
2.	(Norway) Petter Solberg	(United Kingdom) Phil Mills	Citroën C4 WRC	3:43:05.9	24.2	18
3.	(France) Sébastien Ogier	(France) Julien Ingrassia	Citroën C4 WRC	3:43:07.0	25.3	15
4.	(Finland) Mikko Hirvonen	(Finland) Jarmo Lehtinen	Ford Focus RS WRC 09	3:44:29.2	1:47.5	12
5.	(Finland) Jari-Matti Latvala	(Finland) Miikka Anttila	Ford Focus RS WRC 09	3:44:56.8	2:15.1	10
6.	(Norway) Henning Solberg	(Austria) Ilka Minor	Ford Focus RS WRC 08	3:45:29.7	2:48.0	8
7.	(Argentina) Federico Villagra	(Argentina) Jorge Perez Companc	Ford Focus RS WRC 08	3:52:55.1	10:13.4	6
8.	(Spain) Xavier Pons	(Spain) Alex Haro	Ford Fiesta S2000	4:01:26.1	18:44.4	4
9.	(Czech Republic) Martin Prokop	(Czech Republic) Jan Tománek	Ford Fiesta S2000	4:01:43.7	19:02.0	2
10.	(Portugal) Armindo Araújo	(Portugal) Miguel Ramalho	Mitsubishi Lancer Evolution X	4:04:14.2	21:32.5	1
SWRC
1. (8.)	(Spain) Xavier Pons	(Spain) Alex Haro	Ford Fiesta S2000	4:01:26.1	0.0	25
2. (9.)	(Czech Republic) Martin Prokop	(Czech Republic) Jan Tománek	Ford Fiesta S2000	4:01:43.7	17.6	18
3. (20.)	(Poland) Michał Kościuszko	(Poland) Maciek Szczepaniak	Ford Fiesta S2000	4:35:02.9	33:36.8	15
4. (21.)	(Norway) Eyvind Brynildsen	(Norway) Cato Menkerud	Škoda Fabia S2000	4:35:25.9	33:59.8	12
5. (22.)	(Andorra) Albert Llovera	(Spain) Borja Rozada	Abarth Punto S2000	4:38:31.7	37:05.5	10
PWRC
1. (10.)	(Portugal) Armindo Araújo	(Portugal) Miguel Ramalho	Mitsubishi Lancer Evolution X	4:04:14.2	0.0	25
2. (11.)	(Japan) Toshi Arai	(United Kingdom) Daniel Barritt	Subaru Impreza WRX STi	4:07:30.9	3:16.7	18
3. (13.)	(Argentina) Miguel Angel Baldoni	(Argentina) José Diaz	Mitsubishi Lancer Evolution IX	4:13:27.2	9:13.0	15
4. (15.)	(Mexico) Benito Guerra	(Mexico) Javier Marín	Mitsubishi Lancer Evolution X	4:23:23.8	19:09.6	12
5. (17.)	(Italy) Gianluca Linari	(Italy) Paolo Gregoriani	Subaru Impreza WRX STi	4:26:16.9	22:02.7	10

=== Special stages ===
All dates and times are CST (UTC−6).

Day	Stage	Time	Name	Length	Winner	Time	Avg. spd.	Rally leader
1 (5 Mar)	SS1	07:28	Alfaro 1	22.96 km	(Norway) Petter Solberg	13:51.4	97.77 km/h	(Norway) Petter Solberg
1 (5 Mar)	SS2	09:01	Ortega 1	23.83 km	(Norway) Petter Solberg	13:51.4	103.18 km/h	(Norway) Petter Solberg
1 (5 Mar)	SS3	10:39	El Cubilete 1	18.87 km	(Norway) Petter Solberg	11:49.9	95.69 km/h	(Norway) Petter Solberg
1 (5 Mar)	SS4	10:57	Coca-Cola Street Stage 1	1.50 km	(France) Sébastien Ogier	1:16.6	70.50 km/h	(Norway) Petter Solberg
1 (5 Mar)	SS5	12:17	Alfaro 2	22.96 km	(Norway) Petter Solberg	13:56.1	98.86 km/h	(Norway) Petter Solberg
1 (5 Mar)	SS6	13:50	Ortega 2	23.83 km	(Norway) Petter Solberg	13:41.2	104.47 km/h	(Norway) Petter Solberg
1 (5 Mar)	SS7	14:38	El Cubilete 2	18.87 km	(France) Sébastien Ogier	11:38.9	97.20 km/h	(Norway) Petter Solberg
1 (5 Mar)	SS8	15:53	Super Special 1	2.21 km	(France) Sébastien Ogier	1:37.5	81.60 km/h	(Norway) Petter Solberg
1 (5 Mar)	SS9	15:58	Super Special 2	2.21 km	(France) Sébastien Ogier	1:36.9	82.11 km/h	(Norway) Petter Solberg
2 (6 Mar)	SS10	07:54	Ibarilla 1	29.90 km	(France) Sébastien Loeb	18:18.3	98.01 km/h	(Norway) Petter Solberg
2 (6 Mar)	SS11	09:17	Duarte 1	23.27 km	(France) Sébastien Loeb	18:10.2	76.84 km/h	(France) Sébastien Loeb
2 (6 Mar)	SS12	10:08	Derramadero 1	23.28 km	(France) Sébastien Loeb	14:03.7	99.33 km/h	(France) Sébastien Loeb
2 (6 Mar)	SS13	13:12	Coca-Cola Street Stage 2	1.50 km	(France) Sébastien Loeb	1:15.3	71.71 km/h	(France) Sébastien Loeb
2 (6 Mar)	SS14	12:52	Ibarrilla 2	29.90 km	(France) Sébastien Loeb	18:01.6	99.52 km/h	(France) Sébastien Loeb
2 (6 Mar)	SS15	14:55	Duarte 2	23.27 km	(France) Sébastien Loeb	17:44.9	78.67 km/h	(France) Sébastien Loeb
2 (6 Mar)	SS16	15:06	Derramadero 2	23.28 km	(France) Sébastien Loeb	13:50.4	100.92 km/h	(France) Sébastien Loeb
2 (6 Mar)	SS17	16:21	Super Special 3	2.21 km	(France) Sébastien Loeb	1:39.1	80.28 km/h	(France) Sébastien Loeb
2 (6 Mar)	SS18	16:26	Super Special 4	2.21 km	(France) Sébastien Ogier	1:38.1	81.10 km/h	(France) Sébastien Loeb
3 (7 Mar)	SS19	08:43	Guanajuatito	29.13 km	(France) Sébastien Ogier	19:47.8	88.29 km/h	(France) Sébastien Loeb
3 (7 Mar)	SS20	09:34	Sauz Seco	7.05 km	stage cancelled			(France) Sébastien Loeb
3 (7 Mar)	SS21	10:12	Comanjilla	17.88 km	(Norway) Petter Solberg	10:16.2	104.46 km/h	(France) Sébastien Loeb
3 (7 Mar)	SS22	11:27	Super Special 5	4.42 km	(Norway) Petter Solberg	3:12.7	82.57 km/h	(France) Sébastien Loeb

=== Standings after the rally ===
Drivers' Championship standings

Pos.	Driver	Points
1	(France) Sébastien Loeb	43
2	(Finland) Mikko Hirvonen	37
3	(Finland) Jari-Matti Latvala	25
4	(France) Sebastien Ogier	25
5	(Norway) Petter Solberg	20
6	(Norway) Henning Solberg	16
7	(Spain) Dani Sordo	12
8	(United Kingdom) Matthew Wilson	6
9	(Argentina) Federico Villagra	6
10	(Norway) Mads Ostberg	4

Manufacturers' Championship standings

Pos.	Manufacturer	Points
1	(United Kingdom) BP Ford WRT	67
2	(France) Citroen WRT	61
3	(France) Citroen Junior Team	32
4	(United Kingdom) Stobart Ford	28
5	(Argentina) Munchi's Ford	8
