= 2009 Acropolis Rally =

2009 Acropolis Rally 56th Acropolis Rally of Greece
Round 7 of the 2009 World Rally Championship
← Previous event	Next event →
- Host country: Greece
- Rally base: Loutraki
- Dates run: June 12 – 14, 2009
- Stages: 17
- Stage surface: Gravel with some Tarmac

Statistics
- Crews: 44 at start

Overall results
- Overall winner: (Finland) Mikko Hirvonen (United Kingdom) BP Ford Abu Dhabi WRT

The 2009 Acropolis Rally of Greece was the 56th running of the Acropolis Rally and the seventh round of the 2009 World Rally Championship season. The rally consisted of 17 special stages. Ford's Mikko Hirvonen took his first win of the season and Citroën Junior Team's Sébastien Ogier his first-ever podium position. Hirvonen's teammate Jari-Matti Latvala climbed back to third place after going off the road and dropping from first to 11th place on the first day.

Citroën's championship leader Sébastien Loeb crashed out from third place, and Dani Sordo broke his suspension while running second, right behind Hirvonen. Stobart M-Sport Ford's fifth-placed driver Henning Solberg crashed into the same rock as Sordo and also retired. Petter Solberg found himself Hirvonen's main challenger for the win, but also had to retire with a broken suspension.

With mechanical problems for Mads Østberg and Evgeny Novikov, who took his first-ever stage win in the event, Federico Villagra finished fourth, Conrad Rautenbach fifth and Khalid al-Qassimi sixth, which marked his career-best result. Østberg climbed back into the points on the last stage. Home country's Lambros Athanassoulas edged out Nasser Al-Attiyah to win the Production World Rally Championship category, and also collected a WRC point for eighth place overall.

== Results ==
Pos.	Driver	Co-driver	Car	Time	Difference	Points
WRC
1	(Finland) Mikko Hirvonen	(Finland) Jarmo Lehtinen	Ford Focus RS WRC 09	4:09:42.5	0.0	10
2	(France) Sébastien Ogier	(France) Julien Ingrassia	Citroën C4 WRC	4:10:55.4	1:12.9	8
3	(Finland) Jari-Matti Latvala	(Finland) Miikka Anttila	Ford Focus RS WRC 09	4:11:27.5	1:45.0	6
4	(Argentina) Federico Villagra	(Argentina) José Díaz	Ford Focus RS WRC 08	4:13:30.8	3:48.3	5
5	(Zimbabwe) Conrad Rautenbach	(United Kingdom) Daniel Barritt	Citroën C4 WRC	4:13:42.3	3:59.8	4
6	(United Arab Emirates) Khalid al-Qassimi	(United Kingdom) Michael Orr	Ford Focus RS WRC 08	4:16:46.8	7:04.3	3
7	(Norway) Mads Østberg	(Sweden) Jonas Andersson	Subaru Impreza WRC 2008	4:22:07.4	12:24.9	2
8	(Greece) Lambros Athanassoulas	(Greece) Nikolaos Zakheos	Škoda Fabia S2000	4:22:30.1	12:47.6	1
PWRC
1	(Greece) Lambros Athanassoulas	(Greece) Nikolaos Zakheos	Škoda Fabia S2000	4:22:30.1	0.0	10
2	(Qatar) Nasser Al-Attiyah	(Italy) Giovanni Bernacchini	Subaru Impreza WRX STi N14	4:22:52.4	22.3	8
3	(Portugal) Armindo Araújo	(Portugal) Miguel Ramalho	Mitsubishi Lancer Evolution IX	4:24:47.0	2:16.9	6
4	(Japan) Toshi Arai	(Australia) Glenn MacNeall	Subaru Impreza WRX STi	4:25:45.0	3:14.9	5
5	(Czech Republic) Martin Prokop	(Czech Republic) Jan Tománek	Mitsubishi Lancer Evolution IX	4:28:28.9	5:58.8	4
6	(Portugal) Bernardo Sousa	(Portugal) Jorge Carvalho	Fiat Grande Punto S2000	4:31:49.6	9:19.5	3
7	(Latvia) Andis Neiksans	(Latvia) Peteris Dzirkals	Mitsubishi Lancer Evolution IX	4:32:02.6	9:32.5	2
8	(Sweden) Patrik Flodin	(Sweden) Göran Bergsten	Subaru Impreza WRX STi	4:37:28.8	14:58.7	1

== Special stages ==
Day	Stage	Time (EEST)	Name	Length	Winner	Time	Rally leader
1 (12 June)	SS1	8:48	Harvati	25 km	(Finland) Jari-Matti Latvala	18:18.9	(Finland) Jari-Matti Latvala
1 (12 June)	SS2	10:21	Thiva 1	23.76 km	(Spain) Dani Sordo	17:00.6	(Finland) Jari-Matti Latvala
1 (12 June)	SS3	11:44	Evangelistria	21.03 km	Stage cancelled	-:-.-	(Finland) Jari-Matti Latvala
1 (12 June)	SS4	14:02	Bauxites	23.17 km	(Russia) Evgeny Novikov	14:39.8	(Finland) Jari-Matti Latvala
1 (12 June)	SS5	14:56	Drossohori	23.68 km	(France) Sébastien Ogier	19:41.9	(Finland) Jari-Matti Latvala
1 (12 June)	SS6	17:13	Thiva 2	23.76 km	(Finland) Mikko Hirvonen	16:59.5	(Finland) Mikko Hirvonen
2 (13 June)	SS7	9:32	Klenia Mycenae 1	17.25 km	(Finland) Jari-Matti Latvala	11:36.0	(Finland) Mikko Hirvonen
2 (13 June)	SS8	10:35	Ghymno 1	26.28 km	(Russia) Evgeny Novikov	19:03.6	(Finland) Mikko Hirvonen
2 (13 June)	SS9	11:50	Kefelari 1	24.15 km	(Finland) Mikko Hirvonen (Norway) Petter Solberg	19:32.8	(Finland) Mikko Hirvonen
2 (13 June)	SS10	14:50	Klenia Mycenae 2	17.25 km	(Finland) Jari-Matti Latvala	11:21.8	(Finland) Mikko Hirvonen
2 (13 June)	SS11	15:53	Ghymno 2	26.28 km	(Russia) Evgeny Novikov	18:51.2	(Finland) Mikko Hirvonen
2 (13 June)	SS12	17:08	Kefelari 2	24.15 km	(Russia) Evgeny Novikov	19:10.1	(Finland) Mikko Hirvonen
3 (14 June)	SS13	9:33	Loutraki 1	8.98 km	(Norway) Mads Østberg	7:38.2	(Finland) Mikko Hirvonen
3 (14 June)	SS14	10:07	Aghii Theodori 1	33 km	(Norway) Henning Solberg	22:43.2	(Finland) Mikko Hirvonen
3 (14 June)	SS15	10:55	New Pissia	11.3 km	(United Kingdom) Matthew Wilson	8:16.2	(Finland) Mikko Hirvonen
3 (14 June)	SS16	12:51	Loutraki 2	8.98 km	Stage cancelled	-:-.-	(Finland) Mikko Hirvonen
3 (14 June)	SS17	13:25	Aghii Theodori 2	33 km	(Finland) Jari-Matti Latvala	22:14.2	(Finland) Mikko Hirvonen

== Championship standings after the event ==
=== Drivers' championship ===
Pos	Driver	IRL (Republic of Ireland)	NOR (Norway)	CYP (Cyprus)	POR (Portugal)	ARG (Argentina)	ITA (Italy)	GRC (Greece)	POL (Poland)	FIN (Finland)	AUS (Australia)	ESP (Spain)	GBR (United Kingdom)	Pts
1	(France) Sébastien Loeb	1	1	1	1	1	4	Ret						55
2	(Finland) Mikko Hirvonen	3	2	2	2	Ret	2	1						48
3	(Spain) Dani Sordo	2	5	4	3	2	23	12						31
4	(Finland) Jari-Matti Latvala	14	3	12	Ret	6	1	3						25
5	(Norway) Henning Solberg	4	4	18	5	3	8	15						21
6	(Norway) Petter Solberg		6	3	4	Ret	3	Ret						20
7	(United Kingdom) Matthew Wilson	7	7	5	Ret	5	6	14						15
8	(Argentina) Federico Villagra			7	7	4	Ret	4						14
9	(France) Sébastien Ogier	6	10	Ret	17	7	Ret	2						13
10	(Norway) Mads Østberg		9		6		7	7						7
10	(Zimbabwe) Conrad Rautenbach	18	Ret	6	Ret	Ret	9	5						7
12	(United Arab Emirates) Khalid al-Qassimi	8		8	8		16	6						6
13	(Russia) Evgeny Novikov		12	Ret	Ret		5	16						4
13	(Australia) Chris Atkinson	5												4
15	(Qatar) Nasser Al-Attiyah			11	16	8	10	9						1
15	(Estonia) Urmo Aava	10	8											1
15	(Greece) Lambros Athanassoulas							8						1
Pos	Driver	IRL (Republic of Ireland)	NOR (Norway)	CYP (Cyprus)	POR (Portugal)	ARG (Argentina)	ITA (Italy)	GRC (Greece)	POL (Poland)	FIN (Finland)	AUS (Australia)	ESP (Spain)	GBR (United Kingdom)	Pts

Key
Colour	Result
Gold	Winner
Silver	2nd place
Bronze	3rd place
Green	Points finish
Blue	Non-points finish
Blue	Non-classified finish (NC)
Purple	Did not finish (Ret)
Black	Excluded (EX)
Black	Disqualified (DSQ)
White	Did not start (DNS)
White	Cancelled (C)
Blank	Withdrew entry from the event (WD)

=== Manufacturers' championship ===
Pos	Team	Event												Total points
Pos	Team	IRL (Republic of Ireland)	NOR (Norway)	CYP (Cyprus)	POR (Portugal)	ARG (Argentina)	ITA (Italy)	GRC (Greece)	POL (Poland)	FIN (Finland)	AUS (Australia)	ESP (Spain)	GBR (United Kingdom)	Total points
1	(France) Citroën Total World Rally Team	18	14	16	16	18	8	4						94
2	(United States) BP Ford World Rally Team	8	14	10	8	3	18	18						79
3	(United Kingdom) Stobart M-Sport Ford Rally Team	8	8	6	5	10	7	5						49
4	(France) Citroën Junior Team	5	2	4	0	2	6	6						25
5	(Argentina) Munchi's Ford World Rally Team	0	0	3	4	5	0	6						18
