= Federico Villagra =

Argentine rally driver (born 1969)

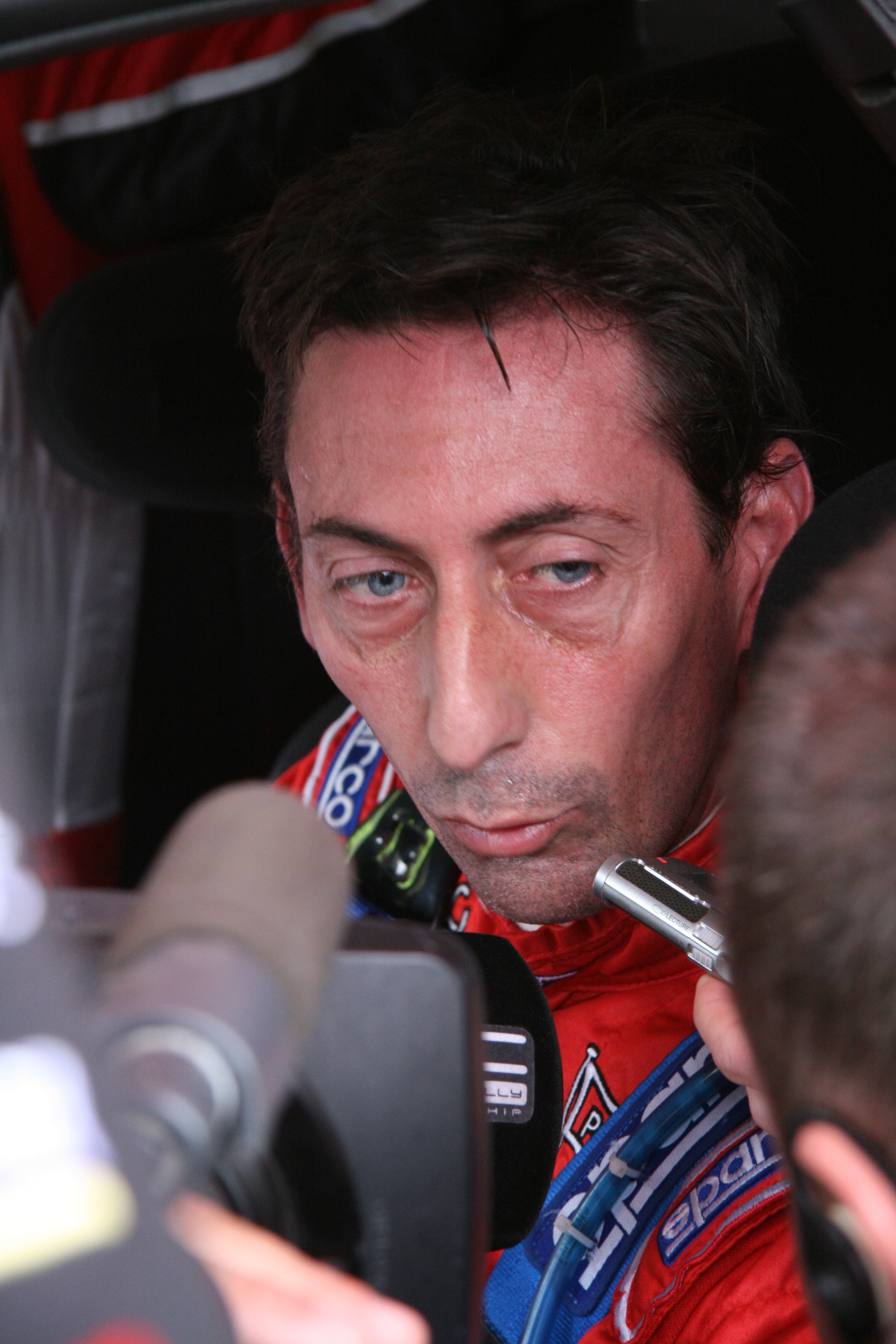
- Villagra at the 2008 Rally of New Zealand.

Personal information
- Nationality: (Argentina) Argentine
- Born: May 1, 1969 (age 57)

World Rally Championship record
- Years active: 2000–2011, 2015
- Co-driver: (Argentina) Javier Villagra (Argentina) Diego Curletto (Argentina) Jorge Perez Companc (Argentina) Jose Maria Volta (Argentina) José Luis Díaz
- Teams: Mitsubishi, Munchi's Ford World Rally Team
- Rallies: 55
- Championships: 0
- Rally wins: 0
- Podiums: 0
- Stage wins: 4
- Total points: 83
- First rally: 1998 Rally Argentina
- Last rally: 2015 Rally Argentina

Federico Villagra (born May 1, 1969) is an Argentine rally driver competing in the Argentine Rally Championship. He had previously competed in the World Rally Championship for the Munchi's Ford World Rally Team. His co-driver is Diego Curletto.

== Career ==
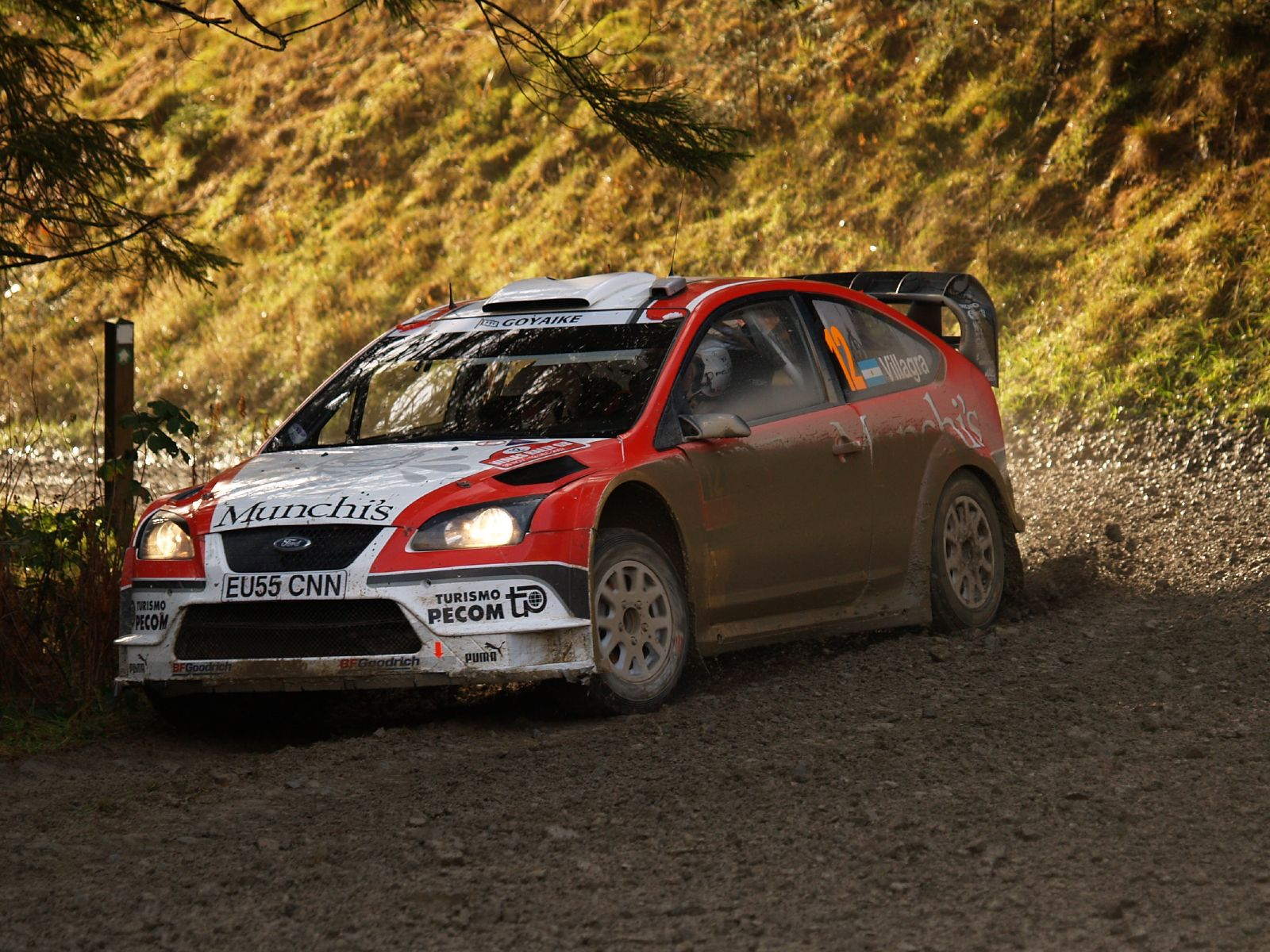
Villagra at the 2007 Wales Rally GB.

After experiencing success in his native championship (including winning the group N4 class every year between 2001 and 2005), Villagra came to the attention of a wider stage by winning the group N class of Rally Argentina in 2006 and 2007. This led to his employment by the Munchi's Ford World Rally Team halfway through the 2007 season. He scored his first points with an attrition aided seventh place in Japan.

In 2008, Villagra once again drove for the Munchi's team in the ten events that they are competing in. He was off the pace in México, which was his first event of the season, but still managed to finish seventh and pick up two drivers points. He improved again at his home event in Argentina, finishing a career best sixth despite reliability issues, and matched this performance again in Jordan.

In 2009, Villagra scored more points than the year before and finished best at fourth place at his home-event 2009 Rally Argentina and also at 2009 Acropolis Rally.

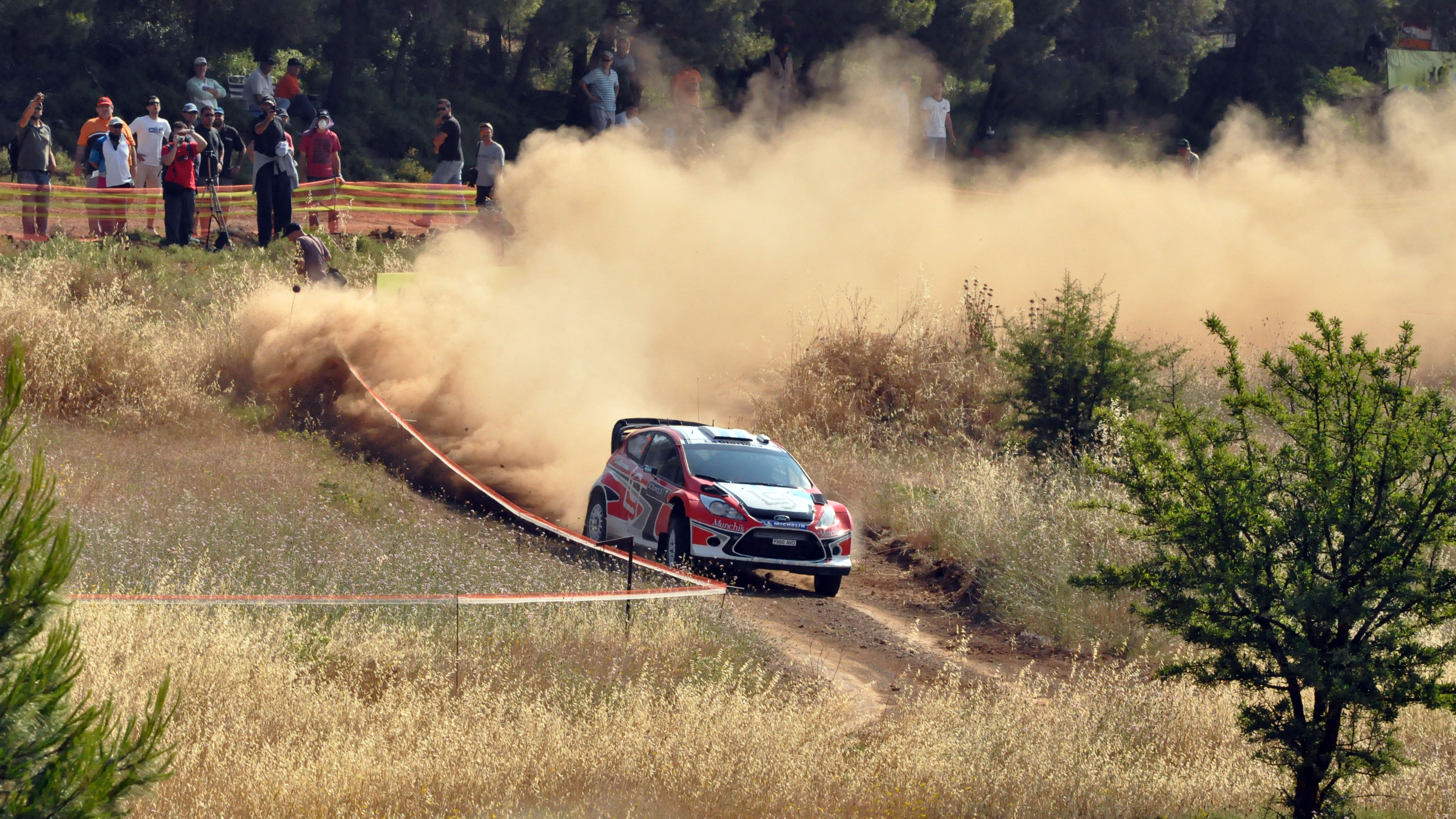
Villagra at the 2011 Acropolis Rally

At season 2010, Villagra changed his livery and continued in scoring points, he scored at least point seven times out of his eight rallies this year. Villagra got 36 points and ninth place overall. He also tried IRC with Ford Fiesta S2000 at 2010 Rally Argentina. Finishing sixth.

== Racing record ==
=== WRC results ===
Year	Entrant	Car	1	2	3	4	5	6	7	8	9	10	11	12	13	14	15	16	WDC	Points
1998	Federico Villagra	Peugeot 405 MI16	MON	SWE	KEN	POR	ESP	FRA	ARG; 22	GRC	NZL	FIN	ITA	AUS	GBR				NC	0
2000	Federico Villagra	Mitsubishi Lancer Evo VI	MON	SWE	KEN	POR	ESP	ARG; 22	GRC	NZL	FIN	CYP	FRA	ITA	AUS	GBR			NC	0
2001	Federico Villagra	Mitsubishi Lancer Evo VI	MON	SWE	POR	ESP	ARG; 15	CYP	GRC	KEN	FIN	NZL	ITA	FRA	AUS	GBR			NC	0
2002	Federico Villagra	Mitsubishi Lancer Evo VI	MON	SWE	FRA	ESP	CYP	ARG; 13	GRE	KEN	FIN	GER	ITA	NZL	AUS	GBR			NC	0
2003	Federico Villagra	Mitsubishi Lancer Evo VI	MON	SWE	TUR	NZL	ARG; 15	GRE	CYP	GER	FIN	AUS	ITA	FRA	ESP	GBR			NC	0
2004	Federico Villagra	Mitsubishi Lancer Evo VIII	MON	SWE	MEX	NZL	CYP	GRE	TUR	ARG; Ret	FIN	GER	JPN	GBR	ITA	FRA	ESP	AUS	NC	0
2005	Federico Villagra	Mitsubishi Lancer Evo VIII	MON	SWE	MEX	NZL; 19	ITA	CYP; 27	TUR; 27	GRE	ARG; DSQ	FIN	GER	GBR				AUS; 16	NC	0
2005	Federico Villagra	Mitsubishi Lancer Evo VII													JPN; Ret	FRA	ESP		NC	0
2006	VRS Rally Team	Mitsubishi Lancer Evo VIII	MON	SWE	MEX	ESP	FRA	ARG; 12	ITA	GRE	GER	FIN	JPN	CYP	TUR	AUS	NZL	GBR	NC	0
2007	VRS Rally Team	Mitsubishi Lancer Evo IX	MON	SWE	NOR	MEX	POR	ARG; 9											20th	2
2007	Munchi's Ford World Rally Team	Ford Focus RS WRC 06							ITA; 11	GRE; 32	FIN; 14	GER	NZL; 11	ESP; 13	FRA	JPN; 7	IRE	GBR; 18	20th	2
2008	Munchi's Ford World Rally Team	Ford Focus RS WRC 07	MON	SWE	MEX; 7	ARG; 6	JOR; 6	ITA; 14	GRE; 13	TUR; 9	FIN; Ret	GER	NZL; 8	ESP; 12	FRA	JPN; 9	GBR		14th	9
2009	Munchi's Ford World Rally Team	Ford Focus RS WRC 08	IRE	NOR	CYP; 7	POR; 7	ARG; 4	ITA; Ret	GRE; 4	POL	FIN; 11	AUS; 8	ESP; 8	GBR					9th	16
2010	Munchi's Ford World Rally Team	Ford Focus RS WRC 08	SWE	MEX; 7	JOR; 7	TUR; 6	NZL; 9	POR; 8	BUL	FIN	GER	JPN; 8	FRA; 7	ESP; 15	GBR				9th	36
2011	Munchi's Ford World Rally Team	Ford Fiesta RS WRC	SWE	MEX; 9	POR; 8	JOR; 7	ITA; 17	ARG; 6	GRE; Ret	FIN	GER	AUS	FRA	ESP; 16	GBR				13th	20
2015	Federico Villagra	Ford Fiesta MR	MON	SWE	MEX	ARG; 10	POR	ITA	POL	FIN	GER	AUS	FRA	ESP	GBR				NC	0

=== PWRC results ===
Year	Entrant	Car	1	2	3	4	5	6	7	8	Pos.	Points
2005	Federico Villagra	Mitsubishi Lancer Evo VIII	SWE	NZL; 6	CYP; 8	TUR; 9	ARG; DSQ	GBR		AUS; 6	14th	7
2005	Federico Villagra	Mitsubishi Lancer Evo VII							JPN; Ret		14th	7
2007	VRS Rally Team	Mitsubishi Lancer Evo IX	SWE	MEX	ARG; 1	GRE	NZL	JPN	IRE	GBR	10th	10

=== Dakar Rally results ===
Year	Class	Vehicle	Position	Stages won
2014	Cars	(United Kingdom) Mini	12th	0
2015	Cars	(United States) Ford	27th	0
2016	Trucks	(Italy) Iveco	3rd	0
2017	Trucks	(Italy) Iveco	4th	0
2018	Trucks	(Italy) Iveco	DNF	2
2019	Trucks	(Italy) Iveco	4th	0
