= 2010 Rally Bulgaria =

2010 Rally Bulgaria 41st Rally Bulgaria
Round 7 of the 2010 World Rally Championship
← Previous event	Next event →
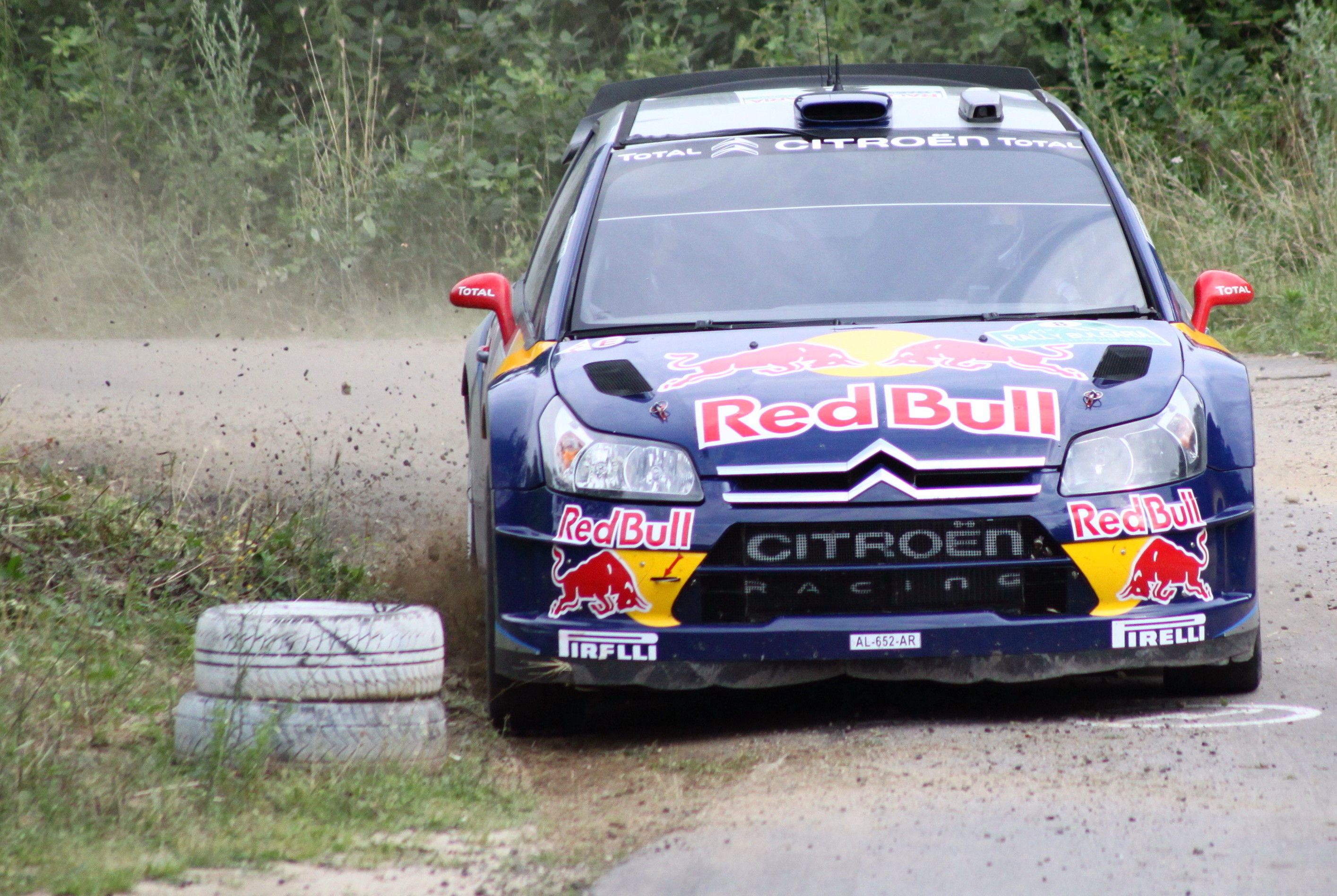
- Kimi Räikkönen finished in eleventh place.
- Host country: Bulgaria
- Rally base: Borovets, Bulgaria
- Dates run: July 9 – 11 2010
- Stages: 14 (354.10 km; 220.03 miles)
- Stage surface: Asphalt
- Overall distance: 1,223.07 km (759.98 miles)

Statistics
- Crews: 40 at start, 27 at finish

Overall results
- Overall winner: (France) Sébastien Loeb (France) Citroën Total WRT

The 2010 Rally Bulgaria was the seventh round of the 2010 World Rally Championship season. The rally took place over July 9–11, and was based in Borovets, around 70 km (43 mi) outside the capital city, Sofia. The rally was also the third round of the Junior World Rally Championship.

Rally Bulgaria made its début in the World Rally Championship, having been approved to the calendar in September 2009. The event was won by Sébastien Loeb, who took his fourth win of the season, and the 58th of his WRC career. Loeb was part of a 1-2-3-4 by Citroën cars, as team-mate Dani Sordo finished second, Petter Solberg finished third in his privately run car and Sébastien Ogier was fourth in a car run by the Citroën Junior Team; the first such result by any manufacturer since 1993.

== Results ==
=== Event standings ===
Pos.	Driver	Co-driver	Car	Time	Difference	Points
Overall
1.	(France) Sébastien Loeb	(Monaco) Daniel Elena	Citroën C4 WRC	3:02:39.2	0.0	25
2.	(Spain) Dani Sordo	(Spain) Marc Martí	Citroën C4 WRC	3:03:08.7	29.5	18
3.	(Norway) Petter Solberg	(United Kingdom) Chris Patterson	Citroën C4 WRC	3:03:15.5	36.3	15
4.	(France) Sébastien Ogier	(France) Julien Ingrassia	Citroën C4 WRC	3:04:34.2	1:55.0	12
5.	(Finland) Mikko Hirvonen	(Finland) Jarmo Lehtinen	Ford Focus RS WRC 09	3:05:57.0	3:17.8	10
6.	(Finland) Jari-Matti Latvala	(Finland) Miikka Anttila	Ford Focus RS WRC 09	3:07:07.7	4:28.5	8
7.	(Sweden) Per-Gunnar Andersson	(Sweden) Jonas Andersson	Ford Focus RS WRC 08	3:08:04.4	5:25.2	6
8.	(Hungary) Frigyes Turán	(Hungary) Gábor Zsiros	Peugeot 307 WRC	3:09:43.2	7:04.0	4
9.	(United Kingdom) Matthew Wilson	(United Kingdom) Scott Martin	Ford Focus RS WRC 08	3:12:07.8	9:28.6	2
10.	(Norway) Henning Solberg	(Austria) Ilka Minor	Ford Fiesta S2000	3:15:45.2	13:06.0	1
JWRC
1. (12.)	(Belgium) Thierry Neuville	(France) Nicolas Klinger	Citroën C2	3:18:21.8	0.0	25
2. (14.)	(Netherlands) Hans Weijs	(Belgium) Bjorn Degandt	Citroën C2	3:19:14.3	52.5	18
3. (16.)	(Bulgaria) Todor Slavov	(Bulgaria) Dobromir Filipov	Renault Clio R3	3:24:38.4	6:16.6	15
4. (17.)	(San Marino) Alessandro Broccoli	(Italy) Angela Forina	Renault Clio R3	3:25:13.6	6:51.8	12
5. (18.)	(Estonia) Karl Kruuda	(Estonia) Martin Järveoja	Suzuki Swift S1600	3:25:14.6	6:52.8	10
6. (19.)	(Spain) Egoi Eder Valdés López	(Spain) Albert Garduno	Renault Clio R3	3:30:24.1	12:02.3	8
7. (21.)	(Netherlands) Kevin Abbring	(Belgium) Erwin Mombaerts	Renault Clio R3	3:31:55.8	13:34.0	6
8. (22.)	(France) Mathieu Arzeno	(France) Romain Roche	Citroën C2	3:38:45.6	20:23.8	4

=== Special stages ===
All dates and times are EEST (UTC+3).

Day	Stage	Time	Name	Length	Winner	Time	Avg. spd.	Rally leader
1 (9 July)	SS1	10:05	Batak Lake 1	31.77 km	(France) Sébastien Loeb	17:33.8	108.53 km/h	(France) Sébastien Loeb
1 (9 July)	SS2	11:38	Belmeken Lake 1	27.57 km	(France) Sébastien Loeb	15:08.5	109.25 km/h	(France) Sébastien Loeb
1 (9 July)	SS3	14:37	Batak Lake 2	31.77 km	(France) Sébastien Loeb	17:35.2	108.39 km/h	(France) Sébastien Loeb
1 (9 July)	SS4	16:10	Belmeken Lake 2	27.57 km	(France) Sébastien Loeb	15:09.2	109.16 km/h	(France) Sébastien Loeb
2 (10 July)	SS5	07:43	Sestrimo 1	27.46 km	(France) Sébastien Loeb	16:27.4	100.12 km/h	(France) Sébastien Loeb
2 (10 July)	SS6	09:36	Peshtera 1	18.13 km	(Spain) Dani Sordo	10:23.6	104.66 km/h	(France) Sébastien Loeb
2 (10 July)	SS7	10:54	Lyubnitsa 1	24.86 km	stage cancelled			(France) Sébastien Loeb
2 (10 July)	SS8	13:22	Sestrimo 2	27.46 km	(Norway) Petter Solberg	16:19.5	100.92 km/h	(France) Sébastien Loeb
2 (10 July)	SS9	15:15	Peshtera 2	18.13 km	(Norway) Petter Solberg	10:24.2	104.56 km/h	(France) Sébastien Loeb
2 (10 July)	SS10	16:33	Lyubnitsa 2	24.86 km	(Norway) Petter Solberg	13:32.8	110.11 km/h	(France) Sébastien Loeb
3 (11 July)	SS11	08:46	Muhovo 1	29.53 km	(Norway) Petter Solberg	15:29.7	114.35 km/h	(France) Sébastien Loeb
3 (11 July)	SS12	09:28	Slavovitsa 1	17.73 km	(Spain) Dani Sordo	9:23.2	113.33 km/h	(France) Sébastien Loeb
3 (11 July)	SS13	11:52	Muhovo 2	29.53 km	(Norway) Petter Solberg	15:22.7	115.21 km/h	(France) Sébastien Loeb
3 (11 July)	SS14	12:34	Slavovitsa 2	17.73 km	(France) Sébastien Ogier	9:17.4	114.51 km/h	(France) Sébastien Loeb

=== Standings after the rally ===
Drivers' Championship standings

Pos.	Driver	Points
1	(France) Sébastien Loeb	151
2	(France) Sebastien Ogier	100
3	(Finland) Mikko Hirvonen	86
4	(Finland) Jari-Matti Latvala	80
5	(Norway) Petter Solberg	78
6	(Spain) Dani Sordo	67
7	(United Kingdom) Matthew Wilson	40
8	(Argentina) Federico Villagra	26
9	(Norway) Henning Solberg	25
10	(Finland) Kimi Räikkönen	15

Manufacturers' Championship standings

Pos.	Manufacturer	Points
1	(France) Citroën WRT	232
2	(United Kingdom) BP Ford WRT	185
3	(France) Citroën Junior Team	125
4	(United Kingdom) Stobart Ford	98
5	(Argentina) Munchi's Ford	40
