= 2010 Rally de Portugal =

Part of the 2010 World Rally Championship

2010 Rally de Portugal Vodafone Rally de Portugal
Round 6 of the 2010 World Rally Championship
← Previous event	Next event →
- Host country: Portugal
- Rally base: Faro, Portugal
- Dates run: May 27 – 30 2010
- Stages: 18 (355.32 km; 220.79 miles)
- Stage surface: Gravel with some asphalt
- Overall distance: 1,223.07 km (759.98 miles)

Statistics
- Crews: 74 at start, 51 at finish

Overall results
- Overall winner: (France) Sébastien Ogier (France) Citroën Junior Team

The 2010 Rally de Portugal was the 44th Rally de Portugal and the sixth round of the 2010 World Rally Championship season. The rally took place over May 27–30, and was based in Faro, the capital city of the Algarve region. The rally was also the second round of the Junior World Rally Championship and the fifth round of the Super 2000 World Rally Championship.

After losing the lead on the final stage in New Zealand, Citroën Junior Team driver Sébastien Ogier took his first WRC victory by 7.9 seconds ahead of championship leader Sébastien Loeb. Third place went to Loeb's team-mate Dani Sordo, with Mikko Hirvonen edging out Petter Solberg for fourth place on the final run through the super-special stage at the Estádio Algarve. Ogier's victory lifted him into second place in the championship standings, 38 points behind Loeb, after his sixth podium finish out of six rallies in 2010.

== Results ==
=== Event standings ===
Pos.	Driver	Co-driver	Car	Time	Difference	Points
Overall
1.	(France) Sébastien Ogier	(France) Julien Ingrassia	Citroën C4 WRC	3:51:16.1	0.0	25
2.	(France) Sébastien Loeb	(Monaco) Daniel Elena	Citroën C4 WRC	3:51:24.0	7.9	18
3.	(Spain) Dani Sordo	(Spain) Marc Martí	Citroën C4 WRC	3:52:33.7	1:17.6	15
4.	(Finland) Mikko Hirvonen	(Finland) Jarmo Lehtinen	Ford Focus RS WRC 09	3:52:48.1	1:32.0	12
5.	(Norway) Petter Solberg	(United Kingdom) Phil Mills	Citroën C4 WRC	3:52:51.8	1:35.7	10
6.	(United Kingdom) Matthew Wilson	(United Kingdom) Scott Martin	Ford Focus RS WRC 08	3:58:26.2	7:10.1	8
7.	(Norway) Mads Østberg	(Sweden) Jonas Andersson	Subaru Impreza WRC 2008	3:58:44.4	7:28.3	6
8.	(Argentina) Federico Villagra	(Argentina) Jorge Pérez Companc	Ford Focus RS WRC 08	4:01:52.2	10:36.1	4
9.	(United Arab Emirates) Khalid Al Qassimi	(United Kingdom) Michael Orr	Ford Focus RS WRC 08	4:02:11.9	10:55.8	2
10.	(Finland) Kimi Räikkönen	(Finland) Kaj Lindström	Citroën C4 WRC	4:02:50.4	11:34.3	1
SWRC
1. (11.)	(Finland) Jari Ketomaa	(Finland) Mika Stenberg	Ford Fiesta S2000	4:07:36.1	0.0	25
2. (12.)	(Spain) Xavier Pons	(Spain) Alex Haro	Ford Fiesta S2000	4:11:08.3	3:32.2	18
3. (13.)	(Poland) Michał Kościuszko	(Poland) Maciek Szczepaniak	Škoda Fabia S2000	4:13:03.5	5:27.4	15
4. (15.)	(Portugal) Bernardo Sousa	(Portugal) Nuno Rodrigues da Silva	Ford Fiesta S2000	4:16:57.4	9:21.3	12
5. (16.)	(Sweden) Per-Gunnar Andersson	(Sweden) Anders Fredriksson	Škoda Fabia S2000	4:23:23.4	15:47.3	10
6. (24.)	(Portugal) Vítor Pascoal	(Portugal) Mário Castro	Peugeot 207 S2000	4:28:55.4	21:19.3	8
7. (25.)	(Qatar) Nasser Al-Attiyah	(Italy) Giovanni Bernacchini	Ford Fiesta S2000	4:30:20.3	22:44.2	6
8. (28.)	(Finland) Janne Tuohino	(Finland) Risto Pietiläinen	Ford Fiesta S2000	4:35:44.1	28:08.0	4
9. (29.)	(Norway) Eyvind Brynildsen	(Norway) Cato Menkerud	Škoda Fabia S2000	4:36:00.0	28:23.9	2
10. (41.)	(Andorra) Albert Llovera	(Spain) Borja Rozada	Abarth Punto S2000	4:58:36.7	51:00.6	1
JWRC
1. (21.)	(Netherlands) Kevin Abbring	(Belgium) Erwin Mombaerts	Renault Clio R3	4:27:34.4	0.0	25
2. (27.)	(Estonia) Karl Kruuda	(Estonia) Martin Järveoja	Suzuki Swift S1600	4:33:29.1	5:54.7	18
3. (32.)	(Germany) Aaron Burkart	(Germany) Andre Kachel	Suzuki Swift S1600	4:38:53.9	11:19.5	15
4. (40.)	(Spain) Yeray Lemes	(Spain) Rogelio Peňate	Renault Clio S1600	4:53:16.3	25:41.9	12
5. (50.)	(Spain) Egoi Eder Valdes Lopez	(Spain) Albert Garduno	Renault Clio R3	5:25:40.2	58:05.8	10
6. (51.)	(United Kingdom) Harry Hunt	(United Kingdom) Sebastian Marshall	Ford Fiesta R2	5:36:13.5	1:08:39.1	8

=== Special stages ===
All dates and times are WEST (UTC+1).

Day	Stage	Time	Name	Length	Winner	Time	Avg. spd.	Rally leader
1 (27–28 May)	SS1	20:30	Estádio Algarve 1	2.03 km	(Finland) Mikko Hirvonen	2:09.3	56.52 km/h	(Finland) Mikko Hirvonen
1 (27–28 May)	SS2	09:30	Santa Clara 1	22.72 km	(Spain) Dani Sordo	14:09.3	96.31 km/h	(Spain) Dani Sordo
1 (27–28 May)	SS3	10:18	Ourique 1	20.21 km	(France) Sébastien Ogier	13:02.5	92.98 km/h	(Spain) Dani Sordo
1 (27–28 May)	SS4	11:16	Silves 1	21.36 km	(France) Sébastien Ogier	12:06.3	105.87 km/h	(France) Sébastien Ogier
1 (27–28 May)	SS5	14:10	Santa Clara 2	22.72 km	(France) Sébastien Ogier	13:54.9	97.97 km/h	(France) Sébastien Ogier
1 (27–28 May)	SS6	14:58	Ourique 2	20.21 km	(France) Sébastien Ogier	13:03.8	92.82 km/h	(France) Sébastien Ogier
1 (27–28 May)	SS7	15:56	Silves 2	21.36 km	(France) Sébastien Ogier	12:05.5	105.99 km/h	(France) Sébastien Ogier
2 (29 May)	SS8	09:27	Almodôvar 1	26.20 km	(France) Sébastien Loeb	16:40.4	94.28 km/h	(France) Sébastien Ogier
2 (29 May)	SS9	10:20	Vascão 1	25.23 km	(France) Sébastien Loeb	16:31.2	91.63 km/h	(France) Sébastien Ogier
2 (29 May)	SS10	11:25	São Brás de Alportel 1	16.12 km	(Norway) Petter Solberg	11:43.4	82.50 km/h	(France) Sébastien Ogier
2 (29 May)	SS11	14:07	Almodôvar 2	26.20 km	(France) Sébastien Ogier	16:38.7	94.44 km/h	(France) Sébastien Ogier
2 (29 May)	SS12	15:00	Vascão 2	25.23 km	(France) Sébastien Loeb	16:29.2	91.82 km/h	(France) Sébastien Ogier
2 (29 May)	SS13	16:05	São Brás de Alportel 2	16.12 km	(France) Sébastien Loeb	11:39.9	82.91 km/h	(France) Sébastien Ogier
3 (30 May)	SS14	07:18	Felizes 1	21.28 km	(France) Sébastien Loeb	13:35.6	93.93 km/h	(France) Sébastien Ogier
3 (30 May)	SS15	08:09	Loulé 1	22.51 km	(France) Sébastien Loeb	15:22.7	87.82 km/h	(France) Sébastien Ogier
3 (30 May)	SS16	10:48	Felizes 2	21.28 km	(France) Sébastien Loeb	13:37.1	93.76 km/h	(France) Sébastien Ogier
3 (30 May)	SS17	11:39	Loulé 2	22.51 km	(France) Sébastien Loeb	15:27.3	87.39 km/h	(France) Sébastien Ogier
3 (30 May)	SS18	13:55	Estádio Algarve 2	2.03 km	(Argentina) Federico Villagra	2:09.9	56.26 km/h	(France) Sébastien Ogier

=== Standings after the rally ===
Drivers' Championship standings

Pos.	Driver	Points
1	(France) Sébastien Loeb	126
2	(France) Sebastien Ogier	88
3	(Finland) Mikko Hirvonen	76
4	(Finland) Jari-Matti Latvala	72
5	(Norway) Petter Solberg	63
6	(Spain) Dani Sordo	49
7	(United Kingdom) Matthew Wilson	38
8	(Argentina) Federico Villagra	26
9	(Norway) Henning Solberg	24
10	(Finland) Kimi Räikkönen	15

Manufacturers' Championship standings

Pos.	Manufacturer	Points
1	(France) Citroen WRT	189
2	(United Kingdom) BP Ford WRT	163
3	(France) Citroen Junior Team	106
4	(United Kingdom) Stobart Ford	84
5	(Argentina) Munchi's Ford	40
