= 2009 Rally Argentina =

2009 Rally Argentina 29º Rally Argentina
Round 5 of the 2009 World Rally Championship
← Previous event	Next event →
- Host country: Argentina
- Rally base: Córdoba–Villa Carlos Paz
- Dates run: April 23 – 26, 2009
- Stages: 23
- Stage surface: Gravel

Statistics
- Crews: 51 at start, 33 at finish

Overall results
- Overall winner: (France) Sébastien Loeb (France) Citroën Total WRT

The 2009 Rally Argentina was the 29th running of the Rally Argentina and the fifth round of the 2009 World Rally Championship season. The rally consisted of 23 special stages and was run on 23–26 April. It was won by Citroën's Sébastien Loeb for the fifth consecutive year. His teammate Dani Sordo finished second.

Ford's Mikko Hirvonen, who was in second place only six seconds behind Loeb after stage 14, retired from the rally due to an engine problem. This gave Loeb a 20-point lead in the drivers' championship. Hirvonen's teammate Jari-Matti Latvala, under pressure to get a good result after his recent crashes, dropped out of contention for the win after a puncture on Friday. His Focus WRC later experienced an electrical problem, costing him over eight minutes, but he managed to continue and finish sixth.

Following Ford's problems, Petter Solberg was on course for his second podium of the season, but he soon ran into fuel pressure problems and the third place was inherited by his brother Henning. This marked his career fourth podium finish. Home country's Federico Villagra beat Stobart's Matthew Wilson to take a career-best fourth place. Citroën Junior Team drivers Sébastien Ogier and Conrad Rautenbach both retired on Saturday. However, Ogier re-joined the rally under superally rules and finished seventh. Production World Rally Championship class winner Nasser Al-Attiyah took the last points-scoring position.

== Results ==
Pos.	Driver	Co-driver	Car	Time	Difference	Points
WRC
1	(France) Sébastien Loeb	(Monaco) Daniel Elena	Citroën C4 WRC	3:57:40.3	0.0	10
2	(Spain) Dani Sordo	(Spain) Marc Marti	Citroën C4 WRC	3:58:53.4	1:13.1	8
3	(Norway) Henning Solberg	(Norway) Cato Menkerud	Ford Focus RS WRC 08	4:01:44.4	4:04.1	6
4	(Argentina) Federico Villagra	(Argentina) Jorge Perez Companc	Ford Focus RS WRC 08	4:03:40.0	5:59.7	5
5	(United Kingdom) Matthew Wilson	(United Kingdom) Scott Martin	Ford Focus RS WRC 08	4:03:51.2	6:10.9	4
6	(Finland) Jari-Matti Latvala	(Finland) Miikka Anttila	Ford Focus RS WRC 08	4:07:30.3	9:50.0	3
7	(France) Sébastien Ogier	(France) Julien Ingrassia	Citroën C4 WRC	4:18:35.4	20:55.1	2
8	(Qatar) Nasser Al-Attiyah	(Italy) Giovanni Bernacchini	Subaru Impreza N14	4:20:51.9	23:11.6	1
JWRC
1	(Poland) Michal Kosciuszko	(Poland) Maciek Szczepaniak	Suzuki Swift S1600	4:42:28.0	0.0	10
2	(Germany) Aaron Nikolai Burkart	(Germany) Michael Kölbach	Suzuki Swift S1600	4:44:08.7	1:39.9	8
3	(Italy) Alessandro Bettega	(Italy) Simone Scattolin	Renault Clio S1600	4:50:02.0	7:33.2	6
PWRC
1	(Qatar) Nasser Al-Attiyah	(Italy) Giovanni Bernacchini	Subaru Impreza N14	4:20:51.9	0.0	10
2	(Argentina) Marcos Ligato	(Argentina) Rubén García	Mitsubishi Lancer Evolution X	4:23:04.8	2:12.9	8
3	(Japan) Toshi Arai	(Australia) Glenn MacNeall	Subaru Impreza	4:27:27.9	6:36.0	6
4	(Cyprus) Spyros Pavlides	(United Kingdom) Chris Patterson	Subaru Impreza N14	4:45:10.4	24:18.5	5
5	(Norway) Eyvind Brynildsen	(France) Denis Giraudet	Mitsubishi Lancer Evolution IX	4:52:49.9	31:58.0	4
6	(Hungary) Gabor Mayer	(Hungary) Robert Tagai	Subaru Impreza	5:00:56.3	40:04.4	3

== Special stages ==
Day	Stage	Time (ART)	Name	Length	Winner	Time	Rally leader
1 (23-24 APR)	SS1	19:05	Estadio Córdoba I	2.4 km	(France) Sébastien Loeb	2:23.6	(France) Sébastien Loeb
1 (23-24 APR)	SS2	7:45	La Cumbre - Agua De Oro I	14.94 km	(Finland) Jari-Matti Latvala	12:48.7	(Finland) Jari-Matti Latvala
1 (23-24 APR)	SS3	8:41	Ascochinga - La Cumbre I	22.38 km	(Spain) Dani Sordo	14:44.1	(Spain) Dani Sordo
1 (23-24 APR)	SS4	9:44	Capilla Del Monte - San Marcos I	22.95 km	(Norway) Petter Solberg	17:33.5	(Finland) Mikko Hirvonen
1 (23-24 APR)	SS5	10:16	San Marcos - Charbonier I	9.61 km	(France) Sébastien Loeb	6:32.5	(Finland) Mikko Hirvonen
1 (23-24 APR)	SS6	14:26	Ascochinga - La Cumbre II	22.38 km	(Spain) Dani Sordo	14:26.8	(Spain) Dani Sordo
1 (23-24 APR)	SS7	15:29	Capilla Del Monte - San Marcos II	22.95 km	(Finland) Mikko Hirvonen	17:16.8	(Finland) Mikko Hirvonen
1 (23-24 APR)	SS8	16:01	San Marcos - Charbonier II	9.61 km	(France) Sébastien Loeb	6:28.9	(Spain) Dani Sordo
1 (23-24 APR)	SS9	17:04	La Cumbre - Agua De Oro II	14.94 km	(Finland) Jari-Matti Latvala	12:32.4	(Spain) Dani Sordo
2 (25 APR)	SS10	9:38	El Mirador - San Lorenzo I	20.81 km	(France) Sébastien Loeb	11:28.0	(Spain) Dani Sordo
2 (25 APR)	SS11	10:12	Mina Clavero - Giulio Cesare I	22.79 km	(France) Sébastien Loeb	18:18.2	(Spain) Dani Sordo
2 (25 APR)	SS12	11:00	El Condor - Copina I	16.29 km	(France) Sébastien Loeb	13:04.6	(France) Sébastien Loeb
2 (25 APR)	SS13	11:46	Icho Cruz - Carlos Paz I	9.73 km	(France) Sébastien Loeb	6:19.4	(France) Sébastien Loeb
2 (25 APR)	SS14	15:23	El Mirador - San Lorenzo II	20.81 km	(Finland) Mikko Hirvonen	11:22.0	(France) Sébastien Loeb
2 (25 APR)	SS15	15:57	Mina Clavero - Giulio Cesare II	22.79 km	(France) Sébastien Loeb	18:04.5	(France) Sébastien Loeb
2 (25 APR)	SS16	16:45	El Condor - Copina II	16.29 km	(Finland) Jari-Matti Latvala	13:06.5	(France) Sébastien Loeb
2 (25 APR)	SS17	17:31	Icho Cruz - Carlos Paz II	9.73 km	(France) Sébastien Loeb	6:26.6	(France) Sébastien Loeb
2 (25 APR)	SS18	19:05	Estadio Córdoba II	2.4 km	(Spain) Dani Sordo	2:23.6	(France) Sébastien Loeb
3 (26 APR)	SS19	8:48	Villa Giardino - La Falda	15.78 km	(France) Sébastien Loeb	11:18.2	(France) Sébastien Loeb
3 (26 APR)	SS20	9:20	Valle Hermoso - Casa Grande	10.95 km	(France) Sébastien Loeb	7:14.8	(France) Sébastien Loeb
3 (26 APR)	SS21	10:03	Cosquin - Tanti	11.27 km	(Finland) Jari-Matti Latvala	6:19.8	(France) Sébastien Loeb
3 (26 APR)	SS22	10:26	Tanta Nuevo - Villa Garcia	7.6 km	(Finland) Jari-Matti Latvala	4:15.9	(France) Sébastien Loeb
3 (26 APR)	SS23	12:05	Estadio Córdoba III	2.4 km	(France) Sébastien Loeb	2:26.6	(France) Sébastien Loeb

== Championship standings after the event ==
=== Drivers' championship ===
Pos	Driver	IRL (Republic of Ireland)	NOR (Norway)	CYP (Cyprus)	POR (Portugal)	ARG (Argentina)	ITA (Italy)	GRC (Greece)	POL (Poland)	FIN (Finland)	AUS (Australia)	ESP (Spain)	GBR (United Kingdom)	Pts
1	(France) Sébastien Loeb	1	1	1	1	1								50
2	(Spain) Dani Sordo	2	5	4	3	2								31
3	(Finland) Mikko Hirvonen	3	2	2	2	Ret								30
4	(Norway) Henning Solberg	4	4	18	5	3								20
5	(Norway) Petter Solberg		6	3	4	Ret								14
6	(United Kingdom) Matthew Wilson	7	7	5	Ret	5								12
7	(Finland) Jari-Matti Latvala	14	3	12	Ret	6								9
7	(Argentina) Federico Villagra			7	7	4								9
9	(France) Sébastien Ogier	6	10	Ret	17	7								5
10	(Australia) Chris Atkinson	5												4
11	(Norway) Mads Østberg		9		6									3
11	(Zimbabwe) Conrad Rautenbach	18	Ret	6	Ret	Ret								3
11	(United Arab Emirates) Khalid al-Qassimi	8		8	8									3
14	(Estonia) Urmo Aava	10	8											1
14	(Qatar) Nasser Al-Attiyah			11	16	8								1
Pos	Driver	IRL (Republic of Ireland)	NOR (Norway)	CYP (Cyprus)	POR (Portugal)	ARG (Argentina)	ITA (Italy)	GRC (Greece)	POL (Poland)	FIN (Finland)	AUS (Australia)	ESP (Spain)	GBR (United Kingdom)	Pts

Key
Colour	Result
Gold	Winner
Silver	2nd place
Bronze	3rd place
Green	Points finish
Blue	Non-points finish
Blue	Non-classified finish (NC)
Purple	Did not finish (Ret)
Black	Excluded (EX)
Black	Disqualified (DSQ)
White	Did not start (DNS)
White	Cancelled (C)
Blank	Withdrew entry from the event (WD)

=== Manufacturers' championship ===
Rank	Driver	Event												Total points
Rank	Driver	IRL (Republic of Ireland)	NOR (Norway)	CYP (Cyprus)	POR (Portugal)	ARG (Argentina)	ITA (Italy)	GRC (Greece)	POL (Poland)	FIN (Finland)	AUS (Australia)	ESP (Spain)	GBR (United Kingdom)	Total points
1	(France) Citroën Total World Rally Team	18	14	16	16	18	-	-	-	-	-	-	-	82
2	(United States) BP Ford World Rally Team	8	14	10	8	3	-	-	-	-	-	-	-	43
3	(United Kingdom) Stobart M-Sport Ford	8	8	6	5	10	-	-	-	-	-	-	-	37
4	(France) Citroën Junior Team	5	2	4	0	2	-	-	-	-	-	-	-	13
5	(Argentina) Munchi's Ford World Rally Team	0	0	3	4	5	-	-	-	-	-	-	-	12
