= 2010 Rallye de France =

Round 11 of the 2010 World Rally Championship season
← Previous event	Next event →
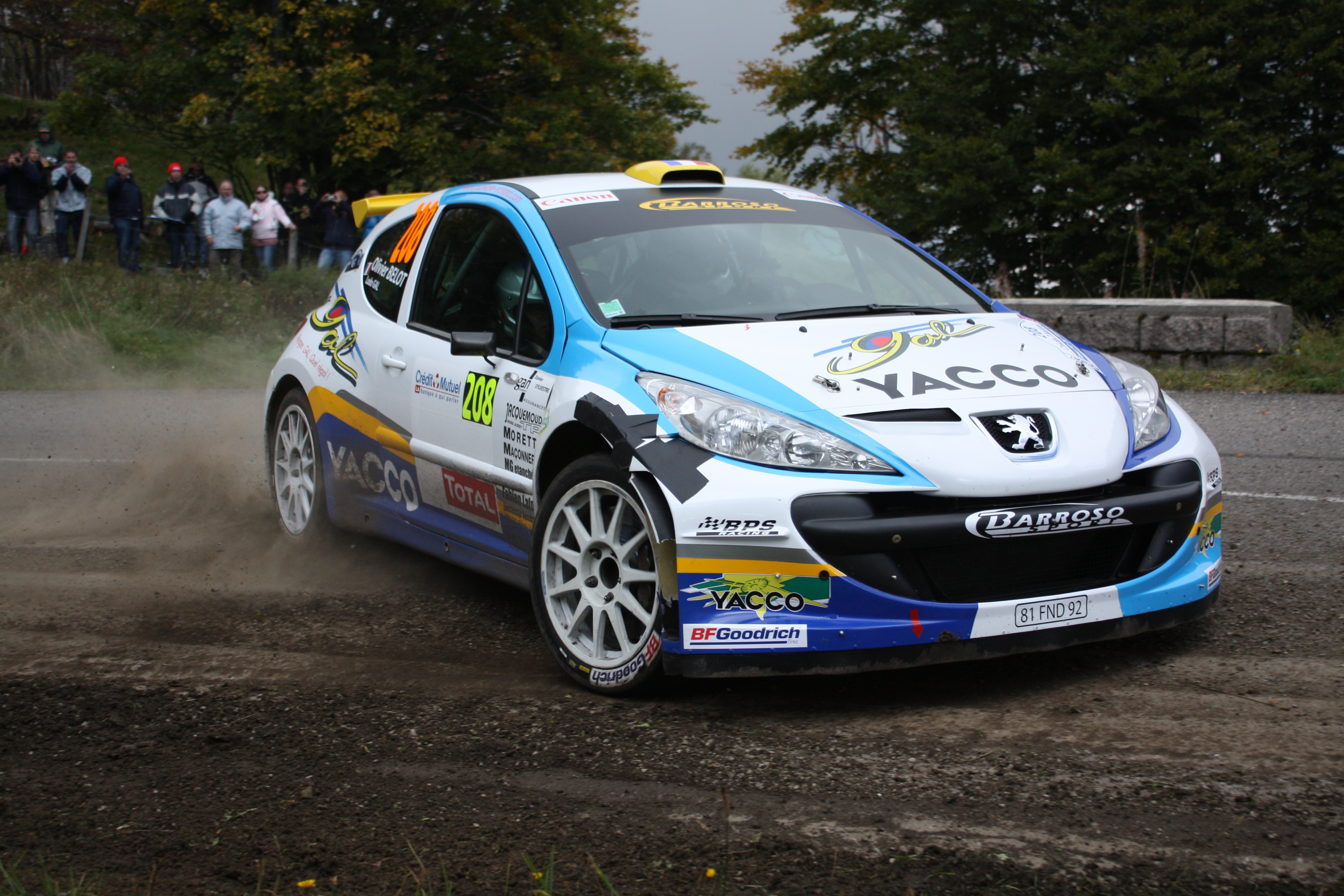
- Host country: France
- Rally base: Strasbourg
- Dates run: 1 – 3 October 2010
- Stages: 20 (352.88 km; 219.27 miles)
- Stage surface: Asphalt
- Overall distance: 1,272.31 km (790.58 miles)

Statistics
- Crews: 67 at start, 49 at finish

Overall results
- Overall winner: (France) Sébastien Loeb (France) Citroën World Rally Team

The 2010 Rallye de France was the first running of the Rallye de France–Alsace and the eleventh round of the 2010 World Rally Championship season. The rally took place over 1–3 October 2010, and was based in Strasbourg, the capital of the Alsace region. The rally was also the eighth round of the Production World Rally Championship, the ninth round of the Super 2000 World Rally Championship and the fifth round of the Junior World Rally Championship.

Sébastien Loeb became champion for the seventh successive season by claiming his 60th WRC win on the streets of his birthplace, Haguenau. Dani Sordo was second and Petter Solberg was third. Thanks to Sordo's second place, Citroën also retained its manufacturers champion title on this same event.

== Introduction ==
Prior to the rally, depending on results, Sébastien Loeb had the chance to clinch his seventh consecutive world title with two events to spare. With a 43-point lead over Sébastien Ogier pre-rally, Loeb had to outscore Ogier by eight points. If Loeb scored more than six points on the event, it would eliminate Ford's Jari-Matti Latvala from championship contention. As it turned out, Loeb won the event which gave him the title.

== Results ==
=== Event standings ===
Pos.	Driver	Co-driver	Car	Time	Difference	Points
Overall
1.	(France) Sébastien Loeb	(Monaco) Daniel Elena	Citroën C4 WRC	3:05:49.3	0.0	25
2.	(Spain) Dani Sordo	(Spain) Diego Vallejo	Citroën C4 WRC	3:06:25.0	35.7	18
3.	(Norway) Petter Solberg	(United Kingdom) Chris Patterson	Citroën C4 WRC	3:07:06.1	1:16.8	15
4.	(Finland) Jari-Matti Latvala	(Finland) Miikka Anttila	Ford Focus RS WRC 09	3:07:18.6	1:29.3	12
5.	(Finland) Mikko Hirvonen	(Finland) Jarmo Lehtinen	Ford Focus RS WRC 09	3:09:33.1	3:43.8	10
6.	(France) Sébastien Ogier	(France) Julien Ingrassia	Citroën C4 WRC	3:17:45.2	11:55.9	8
7.	(Argentina) Federico Villagra	(Argentina) Diego Curletto	Ford Focus RS WRC 08	3:20:04.7	14:15.4	6
8.	(United Kingdom) Matthew Wilson	(United Kingdom) Scott Martin	Ford Focus RS WRC 08	3:20:16.2	14:26.9	4
9.	(Norway) Henning Solberg	(Belgium) Stéphane Prévot	Ford Fiesta S2000	3:22:38.2	16:48.9	2
10.	(Sweden) Patrik Sandell	(Sweden) Emil Axelsson	Škoda Fabia S2000	3:23:01.6	17:12.3	1
SWRC
1. (10.)	(Sweden) Patrik Sandell	(Sweden) Emil Axelsson	Škoda Fabia S2000	3:23:01.6	0.0	25
2. (11.)	(Finland) Jari Ketomaa	(Finland) Mika Stenberg	Ford Fiesta S2000	3:24:57.6	1:56.0	18
3. (14.)	(Poland) Michał Kościuszko	(Poland) Maciek Szczepaniak	Škoda Fabia S2000	3:26:08.6	3:07.0	15
4. (15.)	(Spain) Xavier Pons	(Spain) Alex Haro	Ford Fiesta S2000	3:26:09.6	3:08.0	12
5. (20.)	(Norway) Eyvind Brynildsen	(Norway) Cato Menkerud	Škoda Fabia S2000	3:32:37.7	3:15.2	10
6. (21.)	(Czech Republic) Martin Prokop	(Czech Republic) Jan Tománek	Ford Fiesta S2000	3:33:03.7	10:02.1	8
7. (32.)	(Portugal) Bernardo Sousa	(Portugal) Nuno Rodrigues da Silva	Ford Fiesta S2000	3:42:47.1	19:45.5	6
8. (43.)	(France) Julien Maurin	(France) Gilles Thimonier	Ford Fiesta S2000	3:59:58.2	36:56.6	4
9. (47.)	(Andorra) Albert Llovera	(Spain) Borja Rozada	Abarth Grande Punto S2000	4:10:07.4	47:05.8	2
PWRC
1. (16.)	(Portugal) Armindo Araújo	(Portugal) Miguel Ramalho	Mitsubishi Lancer Evo X	3:28:48.1	0.0	25
2. (19.)	(Estonia) Ott Tänak	(Estonia) Kuldar Sikk	Mitsubishi Lancer Evo X	3:31:14.7	2:26.6	18
3. (23.)	(Japan) Toshi Arai	(United Kingdom) Daniel Barritt	Subaru Impreza WRX STI	3:34:19.3	5:31.2	15
4. (26.)	(San Marino) Alex Raschi	(Italy) Rudy Pollet	Mitsubishi Lancer Evo X	3:36:34.8	7:46.7	12
5. (29.)	(Norway) Anders Grøndal	(Norway) Veronica Engan	Subaru Impreza WRX STI	3:39:39.0	10:50.9	10
6. (31.)	(China) Wang Rui	(China) Pan Hongyu	Subaru Impreza WRX STI	3:41:22.7	12:34.6	8
7. (35.)	(New Zealand) Hayden Paddon	(New Zealand) John Kennard	Mitsubishi Lancer Evo X	3:49:54.1	21:06.0	6
8. (38.)	(Mexico) Michel Jourdain Jr.	(Spain) Oscar Benavente	Mitsubishi Lancer Evo X	3:51:08.2	22:20.1	4
9. (48.)	(Lebanon) Nicholai Georgiou	(Lebanon) Joseph Matar	Mitsubishi Lancer Evo X	4:11:45.1	47:05.8	2
JWRC
1. (22.)	(France) Jérémi Ancian	(France) Damien Mezy	Suzuki Swift S1600	3:34:09.2	0.0	25
2. (24.)	(Netherlands) Hans Weijs Jr.	(Belgium) Bjorn Degandt	Citroën C2 S1600	3:35:13.3	1:04.1	18
3. (27.)	(Belgium) Thierry Neuville	(France) Nicolas Klinger	Citroën C2 S1600	3:36:51.2	2:42.0	15
4. (30.)	(France) Mathieu Arzeno	(Belgium) Renaud Jamoul	Citroën C2 S1600	3:40:26.1	6:16.9	12
5. (36.)	(Germany) Aaron Burkart	(Germany) André Kachel	Suzuki Swift S1600	3:49:55.0	15:45.8	10
6. (37.)	(Bulgaria) Todor Slavov	(Bulgaria) Dobromir Filipov	Renault Clio R3	3:50:23.3	16:14.1	8
7. (39.)	(United Kingdom) Harry Hunt	(United Kingdom) Sebastian Marshall	Ford Fiesta R2	3:53:52.0	19:42.8	6

=== Special stages ===
All dates and times are CEST (UTC+2).

Day	Stage	Time	Name	Length	Winner	Time	Avg. spd.	Rally leader
Leg 1 (1 Oct)	SS1	8:43	Hohlandsbourg 1	9.90 km	(France) Sébastien Loeb	5:18.0	112.08 km/h	(France) Sébastien Loeb
Leg 1 (1 Oct)	SS2	9:01	Firstplan 1	16.58 km	(France) Sébastien Loeb	8:20.3	119.30 km/h	(France) Sébastien Loeb
Leg 1 (1 Oct)	SS3	9:39	Vallée de Munster 1	22.33 km	(France) Sébastien Loeb	11:14.6	119.16 km/h	(France) Sébastien Loeb
Leg 1 (1 Oct)	SS4	11:02	Grand Ballon 1	24.12 km	(France) Sébastien Loeb	13:50.7	104.53 km/h	(France) Sébastien Loeb
Leg 1 (1 Oct)	SS5	14:05	Hohlandsbourg 2	9.90 km	(Finland) Jari-Matti Latvala	5:28.5	108.49 km/h	(France) Sébastien Loeb
Leg 1 (1 Oct)	SS6	14:23	Firstplan 2	16.58 km	(France) Sébastien Loeb	8:25.1	118.17 km/h	(France) Sébastien Loeb
Leg 1 (1 Oct)	SS7	15:01	Vallée de Munster 2	22.33 km	(Spain) Dani Sordo	11:13.5	119.36 km/h	(France) Sébastien Loeb
Leg 1 (1 Oct)	SS8	16:24	Grand Ballon 2	24.12 km	(Finland) Jari-Matti Latvala	14:28.5	99.98 km/h	(France) Sébastien Loeb
Leg 2 (2 Oct)	SS9	8:28	Klevener 1	10.54 km	(France) Sébastien Loeb	6:25.2	98.50 km/h	(France) Sébastien Loeb
Leg 2 (2 Oct)	SS10	8:57	Ungersberg 1	15.50 km	(Spain) Dani Sordo	9:20.4	99.57 km/h	(France) Sébastien Loeb
Leg 2 (2 Oct)	SS11	10:05	Pays d'Ormont 1	35.48 km	(France) Sébastien Loeb	19:39.7	108.27 km/h	(France) Sébastien Loeb
Leg 2 (2 Oct)	SS12	11:03	Salm 1	13.09 km	(Finland) Jari-Matti Latvala	7:18.9	107.37 km/h	(France) Sébastien Loeb
Leg 2 (2 Oct)	SS13	14:16	Klevener 2	10.54 km	(France) Sébastien Ogier	6:22.0	99.33 km/h	(France) Sébastien Loeb
Leg 2 (2 Oct)	SS14	14:45	Ungersberg 2	15.50 km	(Spain) Dani Sordo	9:31.5	97.64 km/h	(France) Sébastien Loeb
Leg 2 (2 Oct)	SS15	15:53	Pays d'Ormont 2	35.48 km	(Norway) Petter Solberg	21:35.2	98.62 km/h	(France) Sébastien Loeb
Leg 2 (2 Oct)	SS16	16:51	Salm 2	13.09 km	(Norway) Petter Solberg	7:35.5	103.46 km/h	(France) Sébastien Loeb
Leg 3 (3 Oct)	SS17	8:29	Haguenau 1	4.20 km	(Norway) Petter Solberg	3:13.3	78.22 km/h	(France) Sébastien Loeb
Leg 3 (3 Oct)	SS18	9:38	Bitche Camp 1	24.70 km	(Spain) Dani Sordo	12:34.4	117.87 km/h	(France) Sébastien Loeb
Leg 3 (3 Oct)	SS19	12:16	Bitche Camp 2	24.70 km	stage cancelled			(France) Sébastien Loeb
Leg 3 (3 Oct)	SS20	13:40	Haguenau 2	4.20 km	(Finland) Jari-Matti Latvala	3:12.3	78.63 km/h	(France) Sébastien Loeb

=== Standings after the rally ===
Drivers' Championship standings

Pos.	Driver	Points
1	(France) Sébastien Loeb	226
2	(France) Sebastien Ogier	166
3	(Finland) Jari-Matti Latvala	144
4	(Norway) Petter Solberg	133
5	(Spain) Dani Sordo	125
6	(Finland) Mikko Hirvonen	104
7	(United Kingdom) Matthew Wilson	60
8	(Argentina) Federico Villagra	36
9	(Norway) Henning Solberg	33
10	(Finland) Kimi Räikkönen	21

Manufacturers' Championship standings

Pos.	Manufacturer	Points
1	(France) Citroen WRT	388
2	(United Kingdom) BP Ford WRT	277
3	(France) Citroen Junior Team	193
4	(United Kingdom) Stobart Ford	140
5	(Argentina) Munchi's Ford	54
