= 2009 Cyprus Rally =

3rd round of the 2009 World Rally Championship

2009 Cyprus Rally 37th FxPro Cyprus Rally
Round 3 of the 2009 World Rally Championship
← Previous event	Next event →
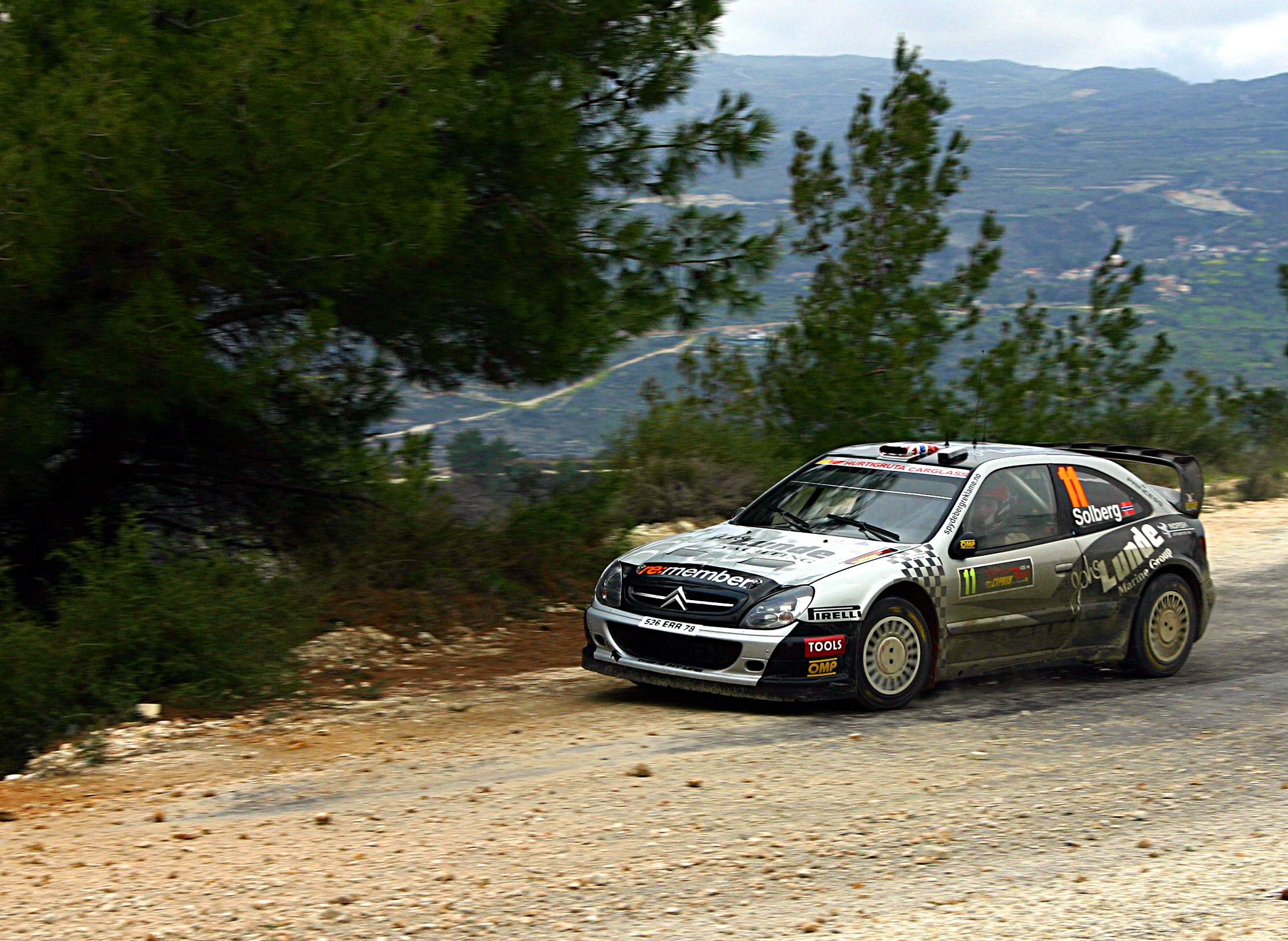
- Petter Solberg driving a Citroën Xsara WRC
- Host country: Cyprus
- Rally base: Limassol, Cyprus
- Dates run: March 13 – March 15, 2009
- Stages: 14 (332.07 km; 206.34 miles)
- Stage surface: Tarmac/Gravel

Overall results
- Overall winner: (France) Sébastien Loeb (France) Citroën Total World Rally Team

The 2009 Cyprus Rally, officially 37th FxPro Cyprus Rally, was the third round of the 2009 World Rally Championship season and was held between March 13 and March 15, 2009 in Limassol, Cyprus. Sébastien Loeb and Daniel Elena claimed the title and won the WRC's first mixed-surface round since 1996.

The Cyprus Rally was last held in 2006, but was dropped along with Rally Australia in favour of new rallies such as Rally Norway, and Rally Ireland, and the returning Rally de Portugal.

Its format changed to a mixed surface rally format from all-gravel rally. The Cyprus Rally was the first rally since Rallye Sanremo - Rallye d'Italia in 1996 to host a mixed surfaced event. Day 1 was contested on tarmac, while days 2 & 3 were contested on rough gravel roads.

== Results ==
Pos.	Driver	Co-driver	Car	Time	Difference	Points
WRC
1.	(France) Sébastien Loeb	(Monaco) Daniel Elena	Citroën C4 WRC	4:50:34.7	0.0	10
2.	(Finland) Mikko Hirvonen	(Finland) Jarmo Lehtinen	Ford Focus RS WRC 08	4:51:01.9	+27.2	8
3.	(Norway) Petter Solberg	(United Kingdom) Phil Mills	Citroën Xsara WRC	4:52:24.1	+1:49.4	6
4.	(Spain) Dani Sordo	(Spain) Marc Marti	Citroën C4 WRC	4:53:01.0	+2:26.3	5
5.	(United Kingdom) Matthew Wilson	(United Kingdom) Scott Martin	Ford Focus RS WRC 08	4:57:15.7	+6:41.0	4
6.	(Zimbabwe) Conrad Rautenbach	(United Kingdom) Daniel Barritt	Citroën C4 WRC	5:01:46.6	+11:11.9	3
7.	(Argentina) Federico Villagra	(Argentina) Jorge Perez Companc	Ford Focus RS WRC 08	5:03:53.2	+13:18.5	2
8.	(United Arab Emirates) Khalid Al-Qassimi	(United Kingdom) Michael Orr	Ford Focus RS WRC 08	5:04:18.8	+13:44.1	1
JWRC
1. (14.)	(Czech Republic) Martin Prokop	(Czech Republic) Jan Tomanek	Citroën C2 S1600	5:20:54.0	0.0	10
2. (17.)	(Poland) Michal Kosciuszko	(Poland) Maciek Szczepaniak	Suzuki Swift S1600	5:22:30.8	+1:36.8	8
3. (21.)	(Germany) Aaron Nicolai Burkart	(Germany) Michael Koelbach	Suzuki Swift S1600	5:40:42.9	+19:48.9	6
PWRC
1. (9.)	(Sweden) Patrik Sandell	(Sweden) Emil Axelsson	Škoda Fabia S2000	5:10:11.3	0.0	10
2. (10.)	(Portugal) Armindo Araujo	(Portugal) Ramalho Miguel	Mitsubishi Lancer Evolution IX	5:10:29.6	+18.3	8
3. (11.)	(Qatar) Nasser Al-Attiyah	(Italy) Giovanni Bernacchini	Subaru Impreza N14 2009	5:11:10.1	+58.8	6
4. (13.)	(Japan) Toshi Arai	(Australia) Glenn MacNeal	Subaru Impreza 2007	5:18:45.4	+8:34.1	5
5. (15.)	(Latvia) Andis Neiksans	(Latvia) Peteris Djirkals	Mitsubishi Lancer Evolution IX	5:21:46.6	+11:35.3	4
6. (16.)	(Cyprus) Charalambos Timotheou	(Cyprus) Savvas Laos	Subaru Impreza N12b	5:22:01.7	+11:50.4	3
7. (19.)	(India) Gaurav Singh Gill	(United Kingdom) David Senior	Subaru Impreza 2008	5:31:22.2	+21:10.9	2
8. (20.)	(France) Frederic Sauvan	(France) Thibault Gorczyca	Mitsubishi Lancer Evolution IX	5:39:10.2	+28:58.9	1

== Special stages ==
Day	Stage	Time (EET)	Name	Length	Winner	Time	Avg. spd.	Rally leader
1 (13 MAR)	SS1	09:23	Panagia 1	30.33 km	(France) Sébastien Loeb	22:01.3	82.68 km/h	(France) Sébastien Loeb
1 (13 MAR)	SS2	10:21	Mylikouri 1	7.37 km	(France) Sébastien Loeb	5:33.9	79.53 km/h	(France) Sébastien Loeb
1 (13 MAR)	SS3	10:46	Gerakies 1	29.40 km	(France) Sébastien Loeb	21:09.2	83.36 km/h	(France) Sébastien Loeb
1 (13 MAR)	SS4	14:34	Panagia 2	30.33 km	(France) Sébastien Loeb	22:06.8	82.30 km/h	(France) Sébastien Loeb
1 (13 MAR)	SS5	15:32	Mylikouri 2	7.37 km	(France) Sébastien Loeb	5:34.9	79.25 km/h	(France) Sébastien Loeb
1 (13 MAR)	SS6	15:57	Gerakies 2	29.40 km	(Spain) Daniel Sordo	21:18.0	82.82 km/h	(France) Sébastien Loeb
2 (14 MAR)	SS7	08:43	Anadiou Dam 1	11.70 km	(Finland) Jari-Matti Latvala	11:02.4	63.59 km/h	(France) Sébastien Loeb
2 (14 MAR)	SS8	09:11	Pano Panagia	28.17 km	(Finland) Mikko Hirvonen	30:29.8	55.42 km/h	(France) Sébastien Loeb
2 (14 MAR)	SS9	11:19	Orkontas	18.54 km	(France) Sébastien Loeb	18:36.5	59.77 km/h	(France) Sébastien Loeb
2 (14 MAR)	SS10	15:17	Xyliatos	30.94 km	(Norway) Petter Solberg	28:16.1	65.66 km/h	(France) Sébastien Loeb
2 (14 MAR)	SS11	16:20	Kourdali	26.25 km	(Norway) Petter Solberg	26:31.5	59.37 km/h	(France) Sébastien Loeb
3 (15 MAR)	SS12	09:18	Foini	30.03 km	(Finland) Mikko Hirvonen	26:18.7	68.48 km/h	(France) Sébastien Loeb
3 (15 MAR)	SS13	10:49	Anadiou	40.54 km	(Finland) Mikko Hirvonen	39:27.2	61.66 km/h	(France) Sébastien Loeb
3 (15 MAR)	SS14	12:02	Anadiou Dam 2	11.70 km	(United Kingdom) Matthew Wilson	10:14.8	68.49 km/h	(France) Sébastien Loeb

== Championship standings after the event ==
=== Drivers' championship ===
Pos	Driver	IRL (Republic of Ireland)	NOR (Norway)	CYP (Cyprus)	POR (Portugal)	ARG (Argentina)	ITA (Italy)	GRC (Greece)	POL (Poland)	FIN (Finland)	AUS (Australia)	ESP (Spain)	GBR (United Kingdom)	Pts
1	(France) Sébastien Loeb	1	1	1										30
2	(Finland) Mikko Hirvonen	3	2	2										22
3	(Spain) Dani Sordo	2	5	4										17
4	(Norway) Henning Solberg	4	4	18										10
5	(Norway) Petter Solberg		6	3										9
6	(United Kingdom) Matthew Wilson	7	7	5										8
7	(Finland) Jari-Matti Latvala	14	3	12										6
8	(Australia) Chris Atkinson	5												4
9	(France) Sébastien Ogier	6	10	Ret										3
9	(Zimbabwe) Conrad Rautenbach	18	Ret	6										3
11	(Argentina) Federico Villagra			7										2
11	(United Arab Emirates) Khalid al-Qassimi	8		8										2
13	(Estonia) Urmo Aava	10	8											1
Pos	Driver	IRL (Republic of Ireland)	NOR (Norway)	CYP (Cyprus)	POR (Portugal)	ARG (Argentina)	ITA (Italy)	GRC (Greece)	POL (Poland)	FIN (Finland)	AUS (Australia)	ESP (Spain)	GBR (United Kingdom)	Pts

Key
Colour	Result
Gold	Winner
Silver	2nd place
Bronze	3rd place
Green	Points finish
Blue	Non-points finish
Blue	Non-classified finish (NC)
Purple	Did not finish (Ret)
Black	Excluded (EX)
Black	Disqualified (DSQ)
White	Did not start (DNS)
White	Cancelled (C)
Blank	Withdrew entry from the event (WD)

=== Manufacturers' championship ===
Rank	Driver	Event												Total points
Rank	Driver	IRL (Republic of Ireland)	NOR (Norway)	CYP (Cyprus)	POR (Portugal)	ARG (Argentina)	ITA (Italy)	GRC (Greece)	POL (Poland)	FIN (Finland)	AUS (Australia)	ESP (Spain)	GBR (United Kingdom)	Total points
1	(France) Citroën Total World Rally Team	18	14	16	-	-	-	-	-	-	-	-	-	48
2	(United States) BP Ford World Rally Team	8	14	10	-	-	-	-	-	-	-	-	-	32
3	(United Kingdom) Stobart M-Sport Ford Rally Team	8	8	6	-	-	-	-	-	-	-	-	-	22
4	(France) Citroën Junior Team	5	2	4	-	-	-	-	-	-	-	-	-	11
5	(Argentina) Munchi's Ford World Rally Team	0	0	3	-	-	-	-	-	-	-	-	-	3
