= 2009 Rally Poland =

8th round of the 2009 World Rally Championship

2009 Rally Poland 66th ORLEN Platinum Rally Poland
Round 8 of the 2009 World Rally Championship
← Previous event	Next event →
- Host country: Poland
- Rally base: Mikołajki
- Dates run: 25 – 28 June 2009
- Stages: 18
- Stage surface: Gravel

Statistics
- Crews: 48 at start, 34 at finish

Overall results
- Overall winner: (Finland) Mikko Hirvonen (United Kingdom) BP Ford Abu Dhabi World Rally Team

The 2009 ORLEN Platinum Rally Poland was the 66th running of the Rally Poland and the eighth round of the 2009 World Rally Championship season. Rally Poland had previously been part of the WRC schedule during the inaugural 1973 season. The rally consisted of 18 special stages and was won by Ford's Mikko Hirvonen, who took his first-ever back-to-back victories. However, the team's celebration was subdued after Jari-Matti Latvala crashed out from second place on the final super special stage, losing important manufacturers' championship points.

Citroën's Dani Sordo then finished second and Stobart's Henning Solberg beat his brother Petter to take the final podium spot. Home country's Krzysztof Hołowczyc, a three-time winner of the event, finished sixth behind regular Stobart driver Matthew Wilson. This marked the first time a Polish driver scored WRC points in the history of the series.

Citroën's defending world champion Sébastien Loeb lost the drivers' championship lead by crashing out in the second rally in a row. However, he re-joined the event under superally rules and with mechanical problems for Andreas Mikkelsen, Mads Østberg and Sébastien Ogier, he had climbed back into the top ten. Citroën then issued team orders and Citroën Junior Team's Conrad Rautenbach and Evgeny Novikov both stopped for enough minutes to let the Frenchman take the eighth place, which eventually became seventh after Latvala's mistake.

== Results ==
Pos.	Driver	Co-driver	Car	Time	Difference	Points
WRC
1	(Finland) Mikko Hirvonen	(Finland) Jarmo Lehtinen	Ford Focus RS WRC 09	3:07:27.5	0.0	10
2	(Spain) Dani Sordo	(Spain) Marc Martí	Citroën C4 WRC	3:08:37.8	+1:10.3	8
3	(Norway) Henning Solberg	(Norway) Cato Menkerud	Ford Focus RS WRC 08	3:09:33.2	+2:05.7	6
4	(Norway) Petter Solberg	(United Kingdom) Phil Mills	Citroën Xsara WRC	3:09:51.8	+2:24.3	5
5	(United Kingdom) Matthew Wilson	(United Kingdom) Scott Martin	Ford Focus RS WRC 08	3:11:45.0	+4:17.5	4
6	(Poland) Krzysztof Hołowczyc	(Poland) Łukasz Kurzeja	Ford Focus RS WRC 08	3:12:01.4	+4:33.9	3
7	(France) Sébastien Loeb	(Monaco) Daniel Elena	Citroën C4 WRC	3:26:42.6	+19:15.1	2
8	(Zimbabwe) Conrad Rautenbach	(United Kingdom) Daniel Barritt	Citroën C4 WRC	3:26:48.1	+19:20.6	1
JWRC
1	(Netherlands) Kevin Abbring	(Belgium) Erwin Mombaerts	Renault Clio R3	3:35:05.2	0.0	10
2	(Czech Republic) Martin Prokop	(Czech Republic) Jan Tománek	Citroën C2 S1600	3:36:15.4	+1:10.2	8
3	(France) Yoann Bonato	(France) Benjamin Boulloud	Suzuki Swift S1600	3:40:39.7	+5:34.5	6
4	(Netherlands) Hans Weijs	(Belgium) Bjorn Degandt	Citroën C2 S1600	3:45:17.2	+10:12.0	5
5	(Italy) Simone Bertolotti	(Italy) Luca Celestini	Suzuki Swift S1600	3:51:50.3	+16:45.1	4
6	(Poland) Radosław Typa	(Poland) Maciej Wisławski	Citroën C2 R2	3:56:32.3	+21:27.1	3
7	(Italy) Luca Griotti	(Italy) Corrado Bonato	Renault Clio R3	4:00:53.6	+25:48.4	2

== Special stages ==
Day	Stage	Time (CEST)	Name	Length	Winner	Time	Rally leader
1 (June 25)	SS1	20:00	Mikołajki 1	2.50 km	(Norway) Petter Solberg	1:48.3	(Norway) Petter Solberg
2 (June 26)	SS2	9:51	Grabówka 1	12.09 km	(Finland) Mikko Hirvonen	6:49.7	(France) Sébastien Loeb
2 (June 26)	SS3	10:19	Pianki 1	11.34 km	(Finland) Mikko Hirvonen	5:22.2	(Finland) Mikko Hirvonen
2 (June 26)	SS4	10:39	Paprotki 1	33.17 km	(Finland) Jari-Matti Latvala	18:14.0	(Finland) Mikko Hirvonen
2 (June 26)	SS5	14:01	Grabówka 2	12.09 km	(Finland) Jari-Matti Latvala	6:49.3	(Finland) Mikko Hirvonen
2 (June 26)	SS6	14:29	Pianki 2	11.34 km	(Finland) Mikko Hirvonen	5:15.4	(Finland) Mikko Hirvonen
2 (June 26)	SS7	14:59	Paprotki 2	33.17 km	(Finland) Jari-Matti Latvala	17:57.2	(Finland) Mikko Hirvonen
3 (June 27)	SS8	10:14	Danowo 1	11.88 km	(France) Sébastien Loeb	6:18.1	(Finland) Mikko Hirvonen
3 (June 27)	SS9	10:59	Gawliki 1	32.75 km	(Spain) Dani Sordo	17:44.4	(Finland) Mikko Hirvonen
3 (June 27)	SS10	11:52	Wydminy 1	30.09 km	(France) Sébastien Loeb	15:40.9	(Finland) Mikko Hirvonen
3 (June 27)	SS11	15:18	Danowo 2	11.88 km	(Finland) Mikko Hirvonen	6:12.5	(Finland) Mikko Hirvonen
3 (June 27)	SS12	16:03	Gawliki 2	32.75 km	(France) Sébastien Loeb	17:21.1	(Finland) Mikko Hirvonen
3 (June 27)	SS13	16:56	Wydminy 2	30.09 km	(France) Sébastien Loeb	15:26.9	(Finland) Mikko Hirvonen
4 (June 28)	SS14	7:51	Miłki 1	27.07 km	(France) Sébastien Ogier	13:59.3	(Finland) Mikko Hirvonen
4 (June 28)	SS15	8:57	Tros 1	15.11 km	(Norway) Henning Solberg	7:53.2	(Finland) Mikko Hirvonen
4 (June 28)	SS16	11:49	Miłki 2	27.07 km	(Norway) Henning Solberg	13:56.0	(Finland) Mikko Hirvonen
4 (June 28)	SS17	12:55	Tros 2	15.11 km	(France) Sébastien Loeb	7:44.4	(Finland) Mikko Hirvonen
4 (June 28)	SS18	14:24	Mikołajki 2	2.50 km	(Norway) Petter Solberg	1:49.0	(Finland) Mikko Hirvonen

== Championship standings after the event ==
=== Drivers' championship ===
Pos	Driver	IRL (Republic of Ireland)	NOR (Norway)	CYP (Cyprus)	POR (Portugal)	ARG (Argentina)	ITA (Italy)	GRC (Greece)	POL (Poland)	FIN (Finland)	AUS (Australia)	ESP (Spain)	GBR (United Kingdom)	Pts
1	(Finland) Mikko Hirvonen	3	2	2	2	Ret	2	1	1					58
2	(France) Sébastien Loeb	1	1	1	1	1	4	Ret	7					57
3	(Spain) Dani Sordo	2	5	4	3	2	23	12	2					39
4	(Norway) Henning Solberg	4	4	18	5	3	8	15	3					27
5	(Finland) Jari-Matti Latvala	14	3	12	Ret	6	1	3	Ret					25
5	(Norway) Petter Solberg		6	3	4	Ret	3	Ret	4					25
7	(United Kingdom) Matthew Wilson	7	7	5	Ret	5	6	14	5					19
8	(Argentina) Federico Villagra			7	7	4	Ret	4						14
9	(France) Sébastien Ogier	6	10	Ret	17	7	Ret	2	Ret					13
10	(Zimbabwe) Conrad Rautenbach	18	Ret	6	Ret	Ret	9	5	8					8
11	(Norway) Mads Østberg		9		6		7	7	Ret					7
12	(United Arab Emirates) Khalid al-Qassimi	8		8	8		16	6						6
13	(Russia) Evgeny Novikov		12	Ret	Ret		5	16	9					4
13	(Australia) Chris Atkinson	5												4
15	(Poland) Krzysztof Hołowczyc								6					3
16	(Qatar) Nasser Al-Attiyah			11	16	8	10	9						1
16	(Estonia) Urmo Aava	10	8											1
16	(Greece) Lambros Athanassoulas							8						1
Pos	Driver	IRL (Republic of Ireland)	NOR (Norway)	CYP (Cyprus)	POR (Portugal)	ARG (Argentina)	ITA (Italy)	GRC (Greece)	POL (Poland)	FIN (Finland)	AUS (Australia)	ESP (Spain)	GBR (United Kingdom)	Pts

Key
Colour	Result
Gold	Winner
Silver	2nd place
Bronze	3rd place
Green	Points finish
Blue	Non-points finish
Blue	Non-classified finish (NC)
Purple	Did not finish (Ret)
Black	Excluded (EX)
Black	Disqualified (DSQ)
White	Did not start (DNS)
White	Cancelled (C)
Blank	Withdrew entry from the event (WD)

=== Manufacturers' championship ===
Pos	Team	Event												Total points
Pos	Team	IRL (Republic of Ireland)	NOR (Norway)	CYP (Cyprus)	POR (Portugal)	ARG (Argentina)	ITA (Italy)	GRC (Greece)	POL (Poland)	FIN (Finland)	AUS (Australia)	ESP (Spain)	GBR (United Kingdom)	Total points
1	(France) Citroën Total World Rally Team	18	14	16	16	18	8	4	12					106
2	(United States) BP Ford World Rally Team	8	14	10	8	3	18	18	10					89
3	(United Kingdom) Stobart M-Sport Ford Rally Team	8	8	6	5	10	7	5	11					60
4	(France) Citroën Junior Team	5	2	4	0	2	5	6	5					29
5	(Argentina) Munchi's Ford World Rally Team	0	0	3	4	5	0	6	0					18
