= Liu Caodong =

Chinese rally driver (1985–2011)

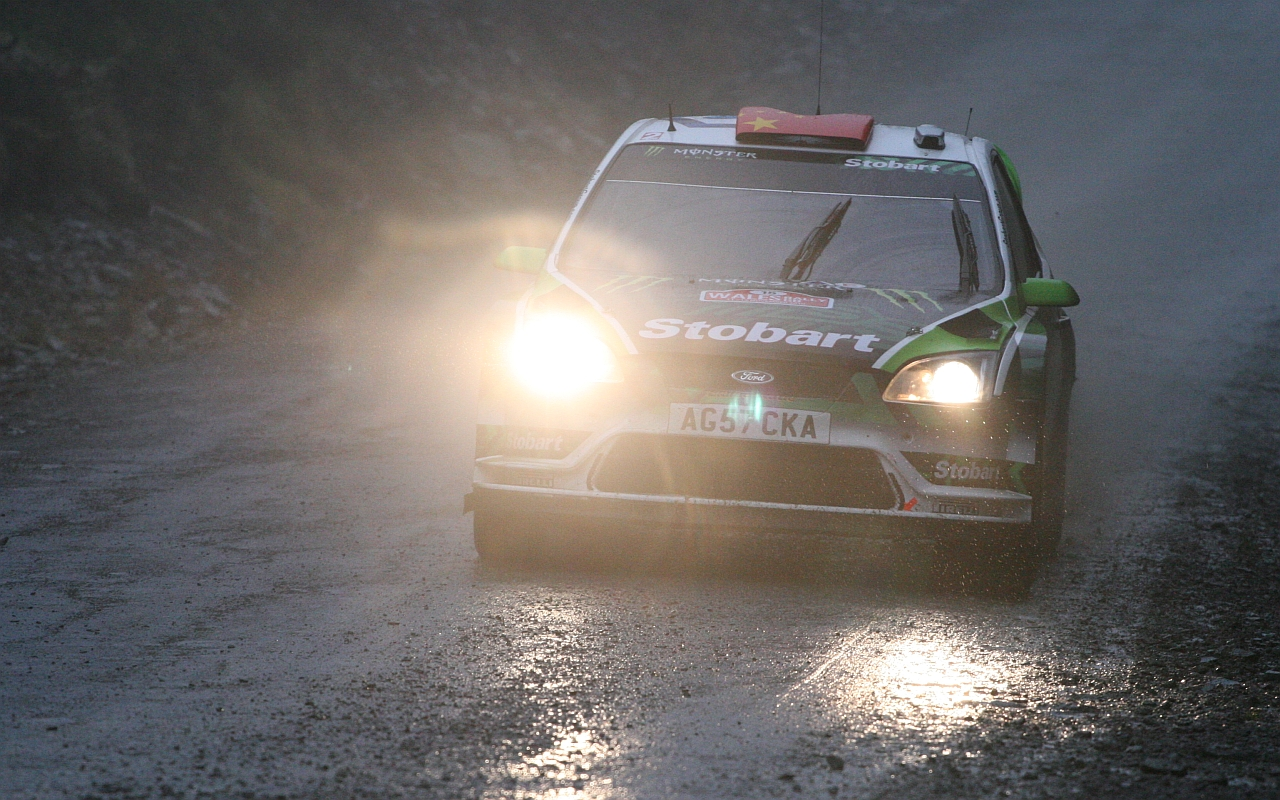

Personal information
- Nationality: (China) Chinese
- Born: February 22, 1985; Chongqing, China
- Died: 8 June 2011 (aged 26); Chengdu, China

World Rally Championship record
- Years active: 2008–2010
- Co-driver: (Australia) Anthony McLoughlin
- Teams: Stobart M-Sport Ford Rally Team
- Rallies: 4
- Championships: 0
- Rally wins: 0
- Podiums: 0
- Stage wins: 0
- Total points: 0
- First rally: 2008 Rally New Zealand
- Last rally: 2010 Wales Rally GB

Liu Caodong (刘曹冬, 22 February 1985 – 8 June 2011) was a Chinese rally driver born in Chongqing. He won the Chinese Rally Championship (CRC) in 2004，2006，2008 and 2010. In 2010, Liu contested in the World Rally Championship (WRC) with the Stobart M-Sport Ford Rally Team driving a Ford Focus RS WRC 08, co-driven by Australian Anthony McLoughlin. His name was misspelled as “Liu Chao Dong” on the entry list. That was the first time that a Chinese driver had driven a World Rally Car in the championship. He died of a cerebral edema caused by hypoxia alcoholism in 2011 at the age of 26.

== WRC results ==
Year	Entrant	Car	1	2	3	4	5	6	7	8	9	10	11	12	13	14	15	WDC	Points
2008	Gaboko Racing	Subaru Impreza WRX STI	MON	SWE	MEX	ARG	JOR	ITA	GRE	TUR	FIN	GER	NZL; 20	ESP	FRA	JPN	GBR	NC	0
2009	TSI Racing	Mitsubishi Lancer Evo IX	IRE	NOR	CYP	POR	ARG	ITA	GRE	POL	FIN	AUS; Ret	ESP	GBR				NC	0
2010	Anders Grondal WRC RT	Subaru Impreza WRX STI	SWE	MEX	JOR	TUR	NZL; Ret	POR	BUL	FIN	GER	JPN	FRA	ESP				NC	0
2010	Stobart M-Sport Ford Rally Team	Ford Focus RS WRC 08													GBR; Ret			NC	0
