= Frigyes Turán =

Hungarian rally driver (born 1974)

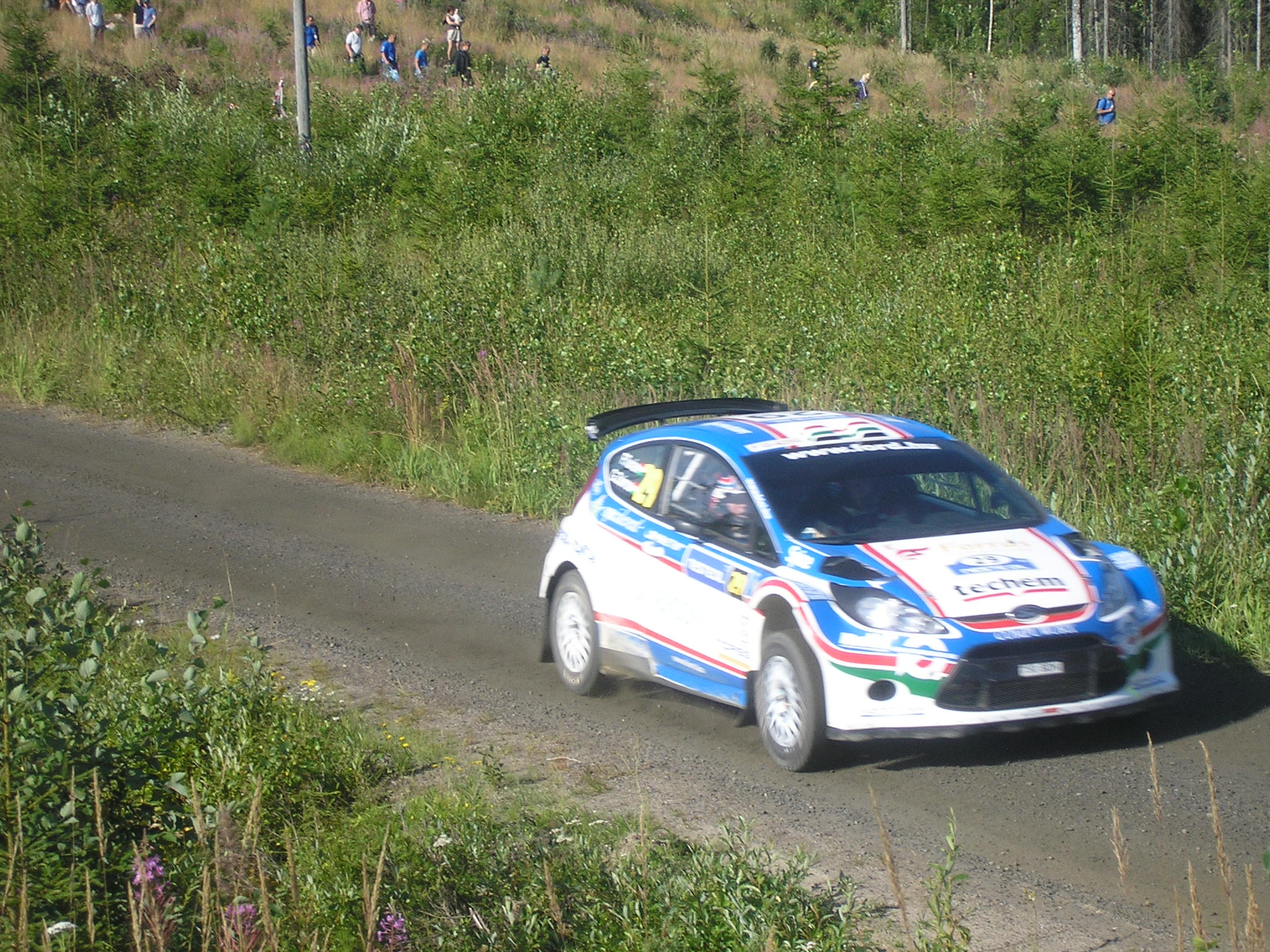
- Turán at 2011 Rally Finland

Personal information
- Nationality: (Hungary) Hungarian
- Born: January 10, 1974 (age 52)

World Rally Championship record
- Years active: 2010
- Teams: Synergon Turán
- Rallies: 4
- Championships: 0
- Rally wins: 0
- Podiums: 0
- Stage wins: 0
- Total points: 4
- First rally: 2010 Rally de Portugal

Frigyes Turán (born January 10, 1974, in Budapest) is a Hungarian rally driver.

== Career ==
A regular competitor in the Hungarian national championship, Turán made his World Rally Championship debut at the 2010 Rally de Portugal driving a Peugeot 307 WRC, finishing 23rd overall. At the next event, Rally Bulgaria, he finished an impressive eighth, ahead of WRC regular Matthew Wilson. His next rally in WRC was Rally France, he retired at ninth Special Stage. At Rally Catalunya, he raced with Ford Focus RS WRC 08 instead of his usual Peugeot 307 WRC. He had stronge results for privateer, finished the second day of rally at seventh place but had to retire after crash at first special stage of the third day (13th stage of whole rally).

== Complete WRC results ==
Year	Entrant	Car	1	2	3	4	5	6	7	8	9	10	11	12	13	WDC	Points
2010	Synergon Turán Motorsport	Peugeot 307 WRC	SWE	MEX	JOR	TUR	NZL	POR; 23	BUL; 8	FIN	GER	JPN	FRA; Ret			16th	4
2010	Synergon Turán Motorsport	Ford Focus RS WRC 08												ESP; Ret	GBR	16th	4
2011	Turán Motorsport	Ford Fiesta S2000	SWE	MEX	POR	JOR; Ret	ITA; 24	ARG	GRE; 13	FIN; 17	GER; 19	AUS	FRA; Ret	ESP	GBR	NC	0

=== SWRC results ===
Year	Entrant	Car	1	2	3	4	5	6	7	8	SWRC	Points
2011	Turán Motorsport	Ford Fiesta S2000	MEX	JOR; Ret	ITA; 7	GRE; 3	FIN; 5	GER; 3	FRA; Ret	ESP	EX†	-†

† Excluded from Championship.
