= Todor Slavov =

Bulgarian racing driver

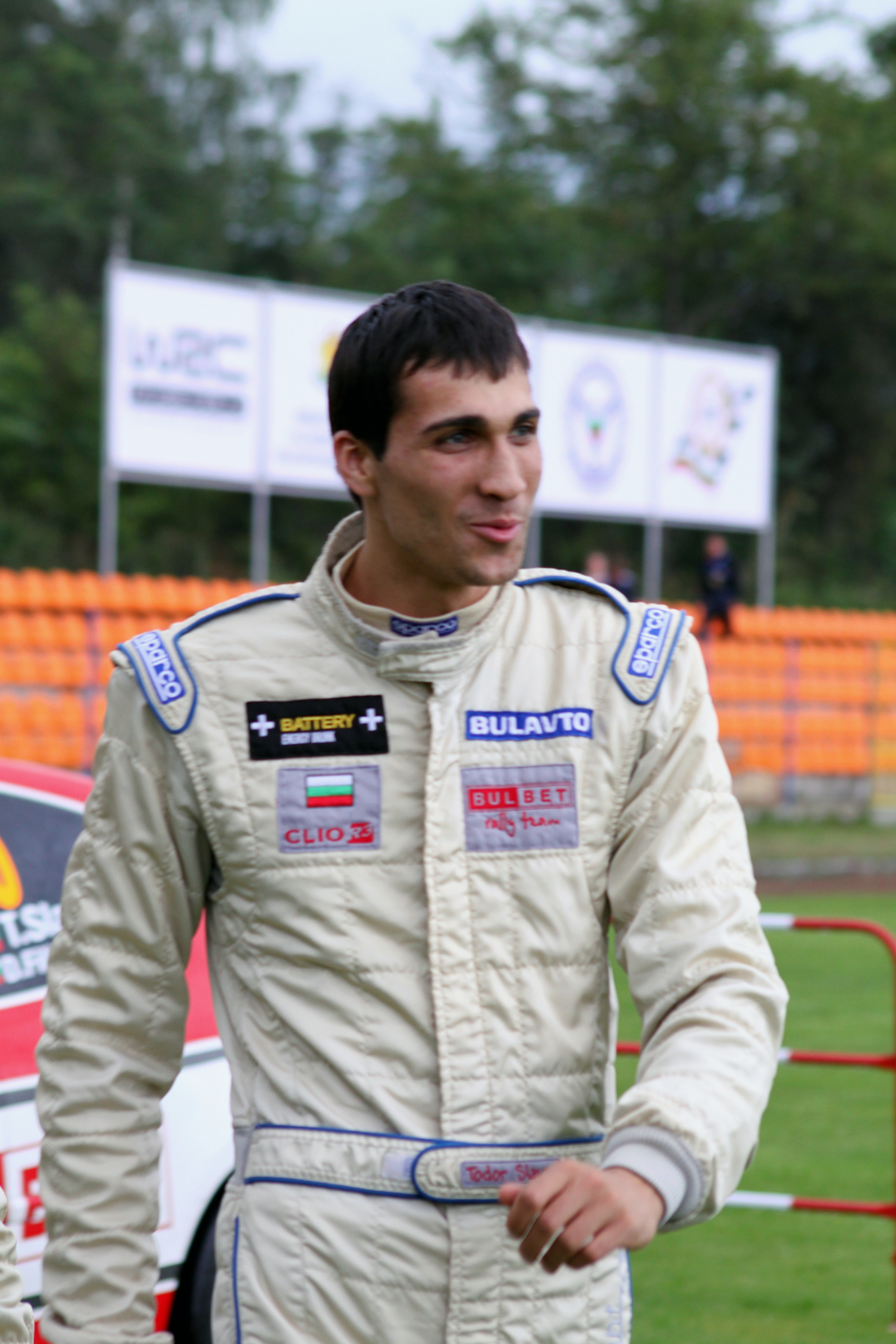
- Nationality: (Bulgaria) Bulgarian
- Born: 22 January 1984 Varna, Bulgaria
- Died: 28 June 2015 (aged 31) near Elena, Bulgaria

Junior World Rally Championship, Bulgarian rally championship career
- Debut season: 2005
- Current team: BULBET Rally Team
- Starts: 39 (A7, N3, N2)
- Wins: 19 (A7, N3, N2)

Championship titles
- 2008(Group A, class A7): 1

Todor Slavov (Bulgarian: Тодор Славов; 22 January 1984 – 28 June 2015) was a Bulgarian rally driver.

== Biography ==
Slavov was born on 22 January 1984 in Varna, a family of Slavi (1964) and Tatyana Slavovi. His father worked in the construction field, and his mother in the system of insurance.

Slavov completed his secondary education in Varna Mathematical School "Dr. Petar Beron". He also attended Varna Technical University, where he studied specialty internal combustion engines.

On 28 June 2015, Slavov was involved in a crash at Rally Tvarditsa-Elena with his Fiat Abarth Grande Punto S2000. Soon after, he died of his injuries.

== Career ==
=== 2003 ===
In 2003, Slavov began to studying race car driving with eight-time rally champion Dimitar Iliev.

=== 2005 ===
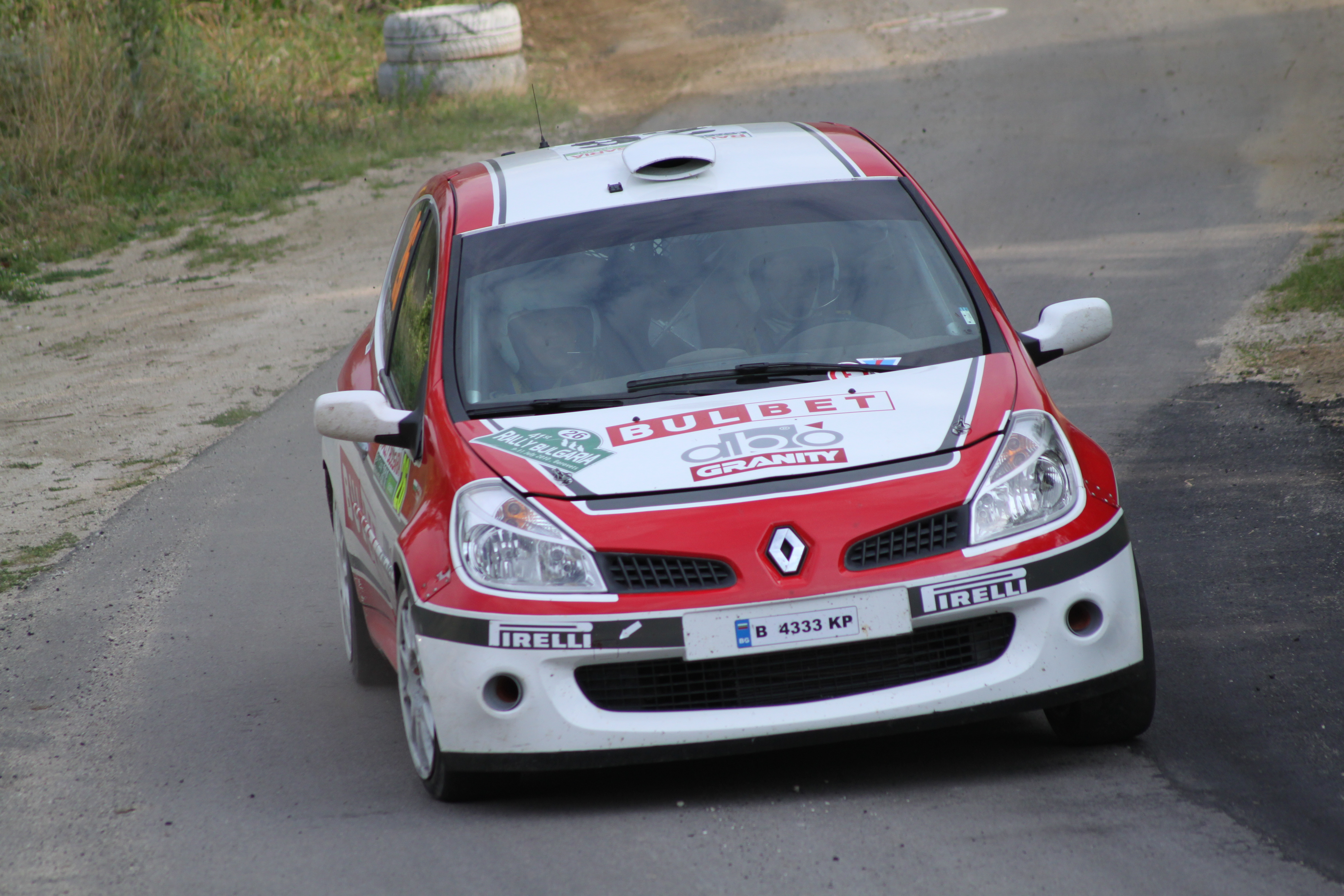
Slavov on the 2010 Rally Bulgaria.

Slavov's competitive career began in 2005, when he debuted in the Hill climb race "Targoviste, where he drove Opel Corsa GSi, Class N2.

Slavov's first rally championship Rally was the Old Capitals in 2005, where he finished sixth. Two races later, he won his first victory in Class N2 - Rally Hebros which climbed him to second place in the overall standings for Class N2. At the end of the year, he finished third in his class.

=== 2006 ===
In 2006, Slavov got behind the wheel of a new car - Renault Clio Sport Class N3, with co-driver Dobromir Filipov. He won three victories in its class, the three most prestigious competitions in Bulgaria - Rally Bulgaria, Rally Hebros and rally Sliven. At the end of the year, he finished in second place in N3 class.

=== 2007 ===
In 2007. the team purchased the latest evolution of competitive Renault Clio - Clio Sport R3. In this year, Slavov achieved his best standings in the overall standings - 4th place in Rally Sliven and 6th place in Rally Serbia. At the end of the year, he finished sixth in the overall standings of the Bulgarian Rally Championship and third in the European Rally Cup - East.

=== 2008 ===
In 2008, Slavov and his co-driver Dobromir Filipov won the title in group A and Class A7 in the Bulgarian championship, for the first time in his career, completing the podium in round National Championship - Rally Sliven. At the end of the year, both are fourth in the overall standings of the Bulgarian Rally Championship. He was the first Bulgarian driver to drive in the European shoot-out of Pirelli Star Driver.

=== 2009 ===
In 2009, Slavov once again competed with the Renault Clio R3, but it is already a modification Maxi. Bulbet team decided to take part in the European rally championship in the category of two wheel drive cars. At the end of the year, he was vice-champion, having achieved three wins in the rallies - Mille Miglia (Italy), Ina-Delta (Croatia) and Automobile and Touring Club of Greece (ELPA, Greece). In the Greek race, Slavov finished for first time on podium in the European rally championship.

Slavov once again drove in the European shoot-out of Pirelli Star Driver.

=== 2010 ===
In 2010, Slavov continued to participate in Renault Clio R3 Maxi. He submitted an application to participate in the Junior World Rally Championship, in which they would take part in 5 of 6 races - in Turkey, Bulgaria, Germany, France and Spain.

=== WRC results ===
Year	Entrant	Car	1	2	3	4	5	6	7	8	9	10	11	12	13	WDC	Points
2010	Todor Slavov	Renault Clio R3	SWE	MEX	JOR	TUR; 16	NZL	POR	BUL; 16	FIN	GER; 54	JPN	FRA; 37	ESP; 14	GBR	NC	0

==== JWRC results ====
Year	Entrant	Car	1	2	3	4	5	6	JWRC	Points
2010	Todor Slavov	Renault Clio R3	TUR; 4	POR	BUL; 3	GER; 7	FRA; 6	ESP; 2	3rd	59
