= 2010 World Rally Championship =

38th season of the FIA World Rally Championship

Champions
- World Drivers' Champion: Sébastien Loeb
- World Manufacturers' Champion: Citroën

Seasons
- ← 2009 2011 →

The 2010 World Rally Championship was the 38th season of the FIA World Rally Championship. The season consisted of 13 rallies, beginning with Rally Sweden on 11 February and ended with Wales Rally GB on 14 November.

France's Sébastien Loeb won the drivers championship, his seventh consecutive title, after winning his home rally on 3 October and Citroën secured their sixth Manufacturers' title. In the junior classes held alongside the main championship, Aaron Burkart won the JWRC Drivers' championship, Xavier Pons won the SWRC Drivers' championship, Red Bull Rally Team won the WRC Cup and Armindo Araújo retained his PWRC Drivers' championship title.

2010 was the final season that the 2.0 litre engine package–which débuted in the 1997 World Rally Championship–was used. It was also the final season that Pirelli was the sole tyre supplier for the championship; as DMACK and Michelin became the tyre suppliers and a new 1.6 litre engine package was introduced for the 2011 season.

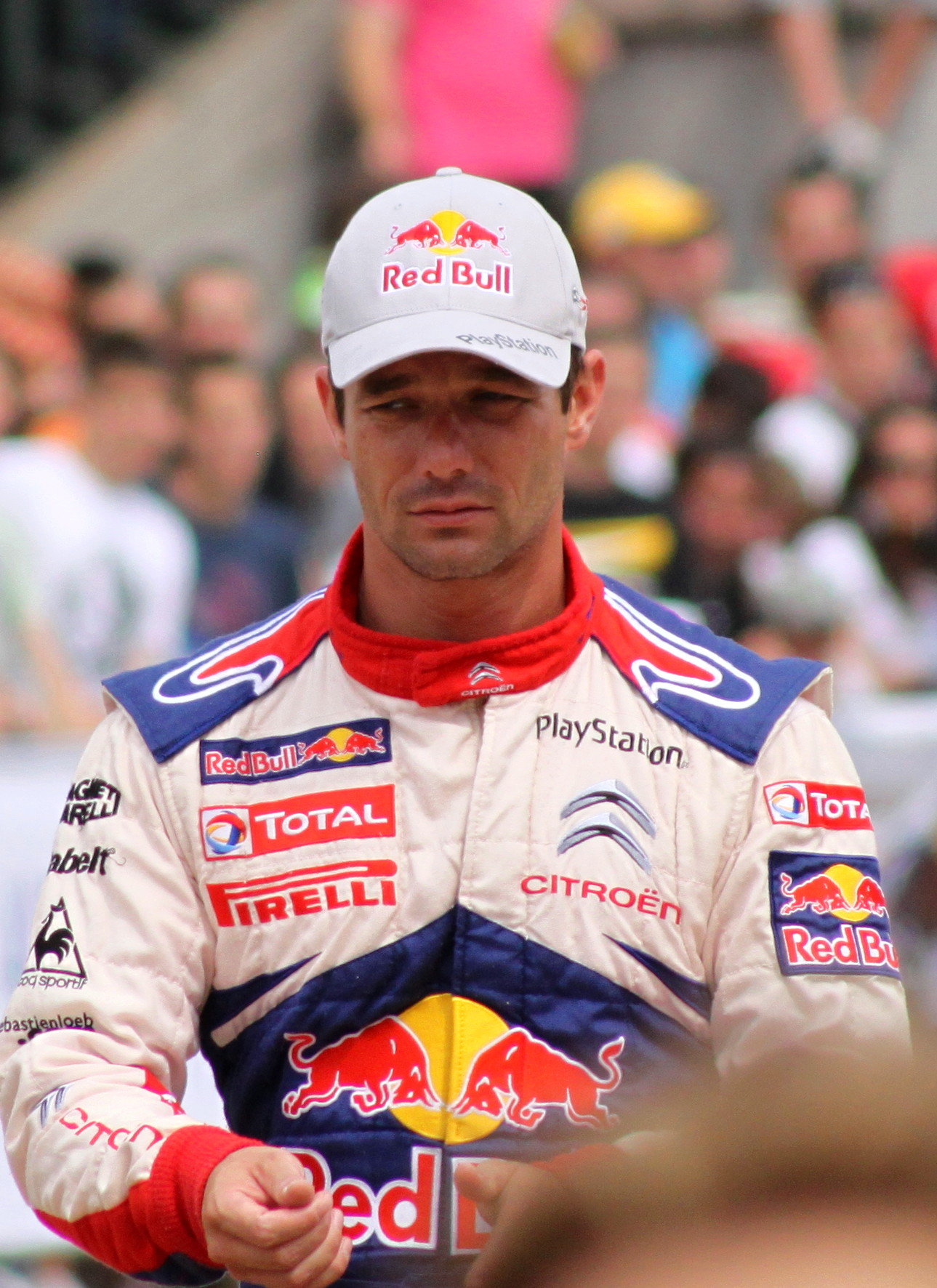
Sébastien Loeb secured his seventh WRC drivers' title.

== Changes ==
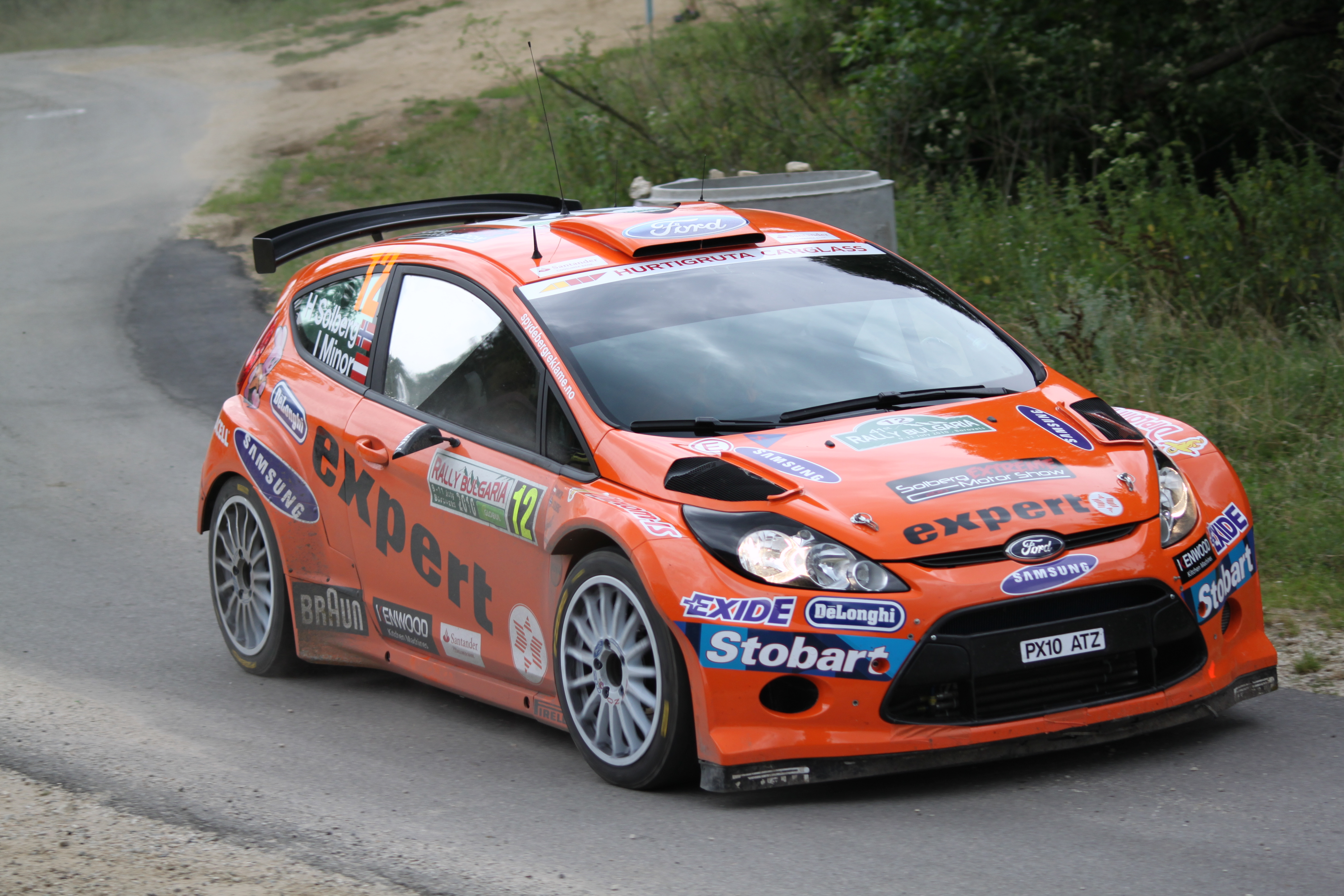
Henning Solberg driving a Ford Fiesta S2000 at the 2010 Rally Bulgaria, the new event of the season.

- Event organisers are given more flexibility. Rallies can be run over two, three or four days, but must finish on a Saturday or Sunday. Mixing asphalt and gravel surfaces is allowed, either within a stage or within the itinerary of a day. There will no longer be a minimum or maximum distance for a special stage. The total stage distance of the event has been changed to 300–500 kilometres. Night stages are permitted but should not form the whole itinerary of a day.
- There will be a new Super 2000 World Rally Championship (SWRC) class for drivers with Super 2000 cars, and within it there will be a WRC Cup for teams. Teams need to contest at least seven rounds, including at least one outside Europe.
- The WRC will also introduce a ranking system called the Drivers' World Rally Ranking system in 2010, similar to that in golf or tennis.
- A new points system has been introduced to all classes for the 2010 season, so that more finishers in a rally are awarded points. Previously points had been awarded to the top eight finishers:

| Year | 1st | 2nd | 3rd | 4th | 5th | 6th | 7th | 8th | 9th | 10th |
|---|---|---|---|---|---|---|---|---|---|---|
| 2009 | 10 | 8 | 6 | 5 | 4 | 3 | 2 | 1 | 0 | 0 |
| 2010 | 25 | 18 | 15 | 12 | 10 | 8 | 6 | 4 | 2 | 1 |

It is the first time since 1997 that ten drivers will score points on a rally.

- From June, the name of the co-driver will be included on the rear side windows of competition cars.

== Calendar ==
The 2010 championship was contested over thirteen rounds in Europe, the Middle East, the Americas, Asia and Oceania.

| Rd. | Start date | Finish date | Rally | Rally headquarters | Surface | Stages | Distance | Support class |
|---|---|---|---|---|---|---|---|---|
| 1 | 11 February | 14 February | 58th Rally Sweden | Karlstad, Värmland County | Snow | 21 | 345.15 km | PWRC/SWRC |
| 2 | 5 March | 7 March | 7th Rally Mexico | León, Guanajuato | Gravel | 22 | 354.60 km | PWRC/SWRC |
| 3 | 1 April | 3 April | 2nd Jordan Rally WRC | Amman | Gravel | 21 | 337.94 km | PWRC/SWRC |
| 4 | 16 April | 18 April | 10th Rally of Turkey | Istanbul, Marmara | Gravel | 23 | 356.64 km | JWRC |
| 5 | 7 May | 9 May | 40th Rally New Zealand | Auckland, North Island | Gravel | 21 | 396.70 km | PWRC/SWRC |
| 6 | 26 May | 30 May | 44th Vodafone Rally de Portugal | Faro, Faro District | Gravel | 18 | 361.18 km | SWRC/JWRC |
| 7 | 9 July | 11 July | 41st Rally Bulgaria | Borovets, Sofia Province | Tarmac | 14 | 353.58 km | JWRC |
| 8 | 29 July | 31 July | 60th Neste Oil Rally Finland | Jyväskylä, Central Finland | Gravel | 19 | 310.79 km | PWRC/SWRC |
| 9 | 20 August | 22 August | (Germany) 28th ADAC Rallye Deutschland | Trier, Rhineland-Palatinate | Tarmac | 19 | 407.31 km | PWRC/SWRC/JWRC |
| 10 | 9 September | 12 September | 9th Rally Japan | Sapporo, Hokkaido | Gravel | 26 | 303.54 km | PWRC/SWRC |
| 11 | 1 October | 3 October | 1st Rallye de France - Alsace | Strasbourg, Alsace | Tarmac | 20 | 351.80 km | PWRC/SWRC/JWRC |
| 12 | 22 October | 24 October | (Spain) 46th RallyRACC Catalunya - Costa Daurada | Salou, Catalonia | Mixed | 16 | 355.30 km | JWRC |
| 13 | 11 November | 14 November | (United Kingdom) 66th Wales Rally GB | Cardiff, Wales | Gravel | 20 | 344.66 km | PWRC/SWRC |

The 2010 season included thirteen rallies, which was one more than 2009. Australia, Argentina, Cyprus, Ireland, Norway, Poland, Italy and Greece were dropped from the calendar for the 2010 season, while Sweden, Mexico, Jordan, Turkey, Germany, New Zealand, France and Japan returned. Bulgaria was part of the calendar for the first time.

The nine events also part of the Production World Rally Championship were Sweden, Mexico, Jordan, New Zealand, Finland, Germany, Japan, France and Great Britain. The six rallies also on the Junior World Rally Championship were Turkey, Portugal, Bulgaria, Germany, France and Spain. The ten rallies on the new Super 2000 World Rally Championship (for S2000 driver) and WRC Cup (for S2000 teams) were Sweden, Mexico, Jordan, New Zealand, Portugal, Finland, Germany, Japan, France and Great Britain.

The finalised calendar was published by the FIA on 11 December 2009, following earlier proposed calendars issued in September and October 2009.

== Teams and drivers ==
In 2010 two categories were eligible to compete for the Manufacturer's championship:

Manufacturer

- must take part in all the rallies of the Championship with two cars of the same make
- must enter only cars corresponding to the 2010 homologated version of a World Rally Car in conformity with the 2010 Appendix J
- must inform the FIA of the name of the first driver entered for the season at the time of registration for the Championship. The driver may change only after the agreement of the WRC Commission. The driver of the second car may be changed for each of the rallies in the Championship

WRC Team

- must take part in a minimum of 8 rallies, including two outside Europe, with one or two cars; those rallies must be nominated on registering for the Championship
- cannot enter World Rally Cars homologated during the year 2010 and cannot use parts homologated after 2 January 2010
- can only score points in the events it nominated on registering.

The registered Manufacturers were Citroën Total World Rally Team and BP Ford Abu Dhabi World Rally Team; the registered WRC Teams were Stobart M-Sport Ford, Munchi's Ford and the Citroën Junior Team.

All teams ran Pirelli tyres.

World Rally Car entries eligible to score manufacturer points
| Manufacturer | Car | Team | Tyre | No | Drivers | Co-drivers | Rounds |
|---|---|---|---|---|---|---|---|
| Citroën | C4 WRC | (France) Citroën Total World Rally Team | P | 1 | (France) Sébastien Loeb | (Monaco) Daniel Elena | All |
| Citroën | C4 WRC | (France) Citroën Total World Rally Team | P | 2 | (Spain) Dani Sordo | (Spain) Marc Martí | 1–7 |
| Citroën | C4 WRC | (France) Citroën Total World Rally Team | P | 2 | (Spain) Dani Sordo | (Spain) Diego Vallejo | 9, 11–12 |
| Citroën | C4 WRC | (France) Citroën Total World Rally Team | P | 2 | (France) Sébastien Ogier | (France) Julien Ingrassia | 8, 10, 13 |
| Ford | Focus RS WRC 09 | (United Kingdom) BP Ford Abu Dhabi World Rally Team | P | 3 | (Finland) Mikko Hirvonen | (Finland) Jarmo Lehtinen | All |
| Ford | Focus RS WRC 09 | (United Kingdom) BP Ford Abu Dhabi World Rally Team | P | 4 | (Finland) Jari-Matti Latvala | (Finland) Miikka Anttila | All |
World Rally Car entries eligible to score manufacturer WRC team points
| Ford | Focus RS WRC 08 | (United Kingdom) Stobart M-Sport Ford Rally Team | P | 5 | (Finland) Marcus Grönholm | (Finland) Timo Rautiainen | 1 |
| Ford | Focus RS WRC 08 | (United Kingdom) Stobart M-Sport Ford Rally Team | P | 5 | (United Kingdom) Matthew Wilson | (United Kingdom) Scott Martin | 2–13 |
| Ford | Focus RS WRC 08 | (United Kingdom) Stobart M-Sport Ford Rally Team | P | 6 | (Norway) Henning Solberg | (Austria) Ilka Minor | 1–6, 8, 10 |
| Ford | Focus RS WRC 08 | (United Kingdom) Stobart M-Sport Ford Rally Team | P | 6 | (Norway) Henning Solberg | (Belgium) Stéphane Prévot | 13 |
| Ford | Focus RS WRC 08 | (United Kingdom) Stobart M-Sport Ford Rally Team | P | 6 | (Sweden) Per-Gunnar Andersson | (Sweden) Jonas Andersson | 7 |
| Ford | Focus RS WRC 08 | (United Kingdom) Stobart M-Sport Ford Rally Team | P | 6 | (Belgium) François Duval | (France) Denis Giraudet | 9 |
| Ford | Focus RS WRC 08 | (United Kingdom) Stobart M-Sport Ford Rally Team | P | 43 | (United States) Ken Block | (Italy) Alex Gelsomino | 11–12 |
| Ford | Focus RS WRC 08 | (Argentina) Munchi's Ford World Rally Team | P | 9 | (Argentina) Federico Villagra | (Argentina) Jorge Pérez Companc | 2–3, 5–6, 10 |
| Ford | Focus RS WRC 08 | (Argentina) Munchi's Ford World Rally Team | P | 9 | (Argentina) Federico Villagra | (Argentina) José Díaz | 4, 12 |
| Ford | Focus RS WRC 08 | (Argentina) Munchi's Ford World Rally Team | P | 9 | (Argentina) Federico Villagra | (Argentina) Diego Curletto | 11 |
| Citroën | C4 WRC | (France) Citroën Junior Team | P | 7 | (France) Sébastien Ogier | (France) Julien Ingrassia | 1–7, 9, 11–12 |
| Citroën | C4 WRC | (France) Citroën Junior Team | P | 7 | (Spain) Dani Sordo | (Spain) Marc Martí | 8 |
| Citroën | C4 WRC | (France) Citroën Junior Team | P | 7 | (Spain) Dani Sordo | (Spain) Diego Vallejo | 10, 13 |
| Citroën | C4 WRC | (France) Citroën Junior Team | P | 8 | (Finland) Kimi Räikkönen | (Finland) Kaj Lindström | 1–4, 6–13 |

World Rally Car entries ineligible to score manufacturer points
| Manufacturer | Car | Team | Tire | Drivers | Co-drivers | Rounds |
|---|---|---|---|---|---|---|
| Citroën | C4 WRC | (Norway) Petter Solberg World Rally Team | P | (Norway) Petter Solberg | (United Kingdom) Phil Mills | 1–6 |
| Citroën | C4 WRC | (Norway) Petter Solberg World Rally Team | P | (Norway) Petter Solberg | (United Kingdom) Chris Patterson | 7–13 |
| Citroën | Xsara WRC | (Norway) Petter Solberg World Rally Team | P | (France) Yvan Muller | (France) Gilles Mondesir | 11 |
| Ford | Focus RS WRC 08 | (United Kingdom) Stobart M-Sport Ford Rally Team | P | (United Kingdom) Matthew Wilson | (United Kingdom) Scott Martin | 1 |
| Ford | Focus RS WRC 08 | (United Kingdom) Stobart M-Sport Ford Rally Team | P | (Finland) Mattias Therman | (Finland) Janne Perala | 1, 8 |
| Ford | Focus RS WRC 08 | (United Kingdom) Stobart M-Sport Ford Rally Team | P | (Finland) Juha Kankkunen | (Finland) Juha Repo | 8 |
| Ford | Focus RS WRC 08 | (United Kingdom) Stobart M-Sport Ford Rally Team | P | (China) Liu Chao Dong | (Australia) Anthony McLoughlin | 13 |
| Ford | Focus RS WRC 08 | (United Kingdom) BP Ford Abu Dhabi World Rally Team | P | (United Arab Emirates) Khalid Al Qassimi | (United Kingdom) Michael Orr | 1, 6, 8–13 |
| Ford | Focus RS WRC 08 | (United States) Monster World Rally Team | P | (United States) Ken Block | (Italy) Alex Gelsomino | 2, 4, 6, 9, 13 |
| Ford | Focus RS WRC 08 | (Netherlands) Vanloon Racing | | (Netherlands) Erik van Loon | (Netherlands) Harmen Scholtalbers | 9 |
| Ford | Focus RS WRC 08 | (Hungary) Synergon Turan Motorsport | P | (Hungary) Frigyes Turán | (Hungary) Gábor Zsiros | 12 |
| Ford | Focus RS WRC 07 | (Netherlands) Van Merksteijn Motorsport | P | (Netherlands) Peter van Merksteijn Sr. | (Belgium) Erwin Mombearts | 1 |
| Ford | Focus RS WRC 07 | (Netherlands) Van Merksteijn Motorsport | | (Netherlands) Peter van Merksteijn Jr. | (Belgium) Eddy Chevaillier | 1 |
| Ford | Focus RS WRC 07 | (Netherlands) Van Merksteijn Motorsport | P | (Netherlands) Bernhard ten Brinke | (Belgium) Eddy Chevaillier | 9 |
| Ford | Focus RS WRC 07 | (France) Laurent Carbonaro | | (France) Laurent Carbonaro | (France) Thierry Leon | 6 |
| Ford | Focus RS WRC 06 | (Netherlands) Ipatec Racing | P | (Netherlands) Dennis Kuipers | (Belgium) Frédéric Miclotte | 1 |
| Ford | Focus RS WRC 06 | (Netherlands) Ipatec Racing | | (Netherlands) René Kuipers | (Netherlands) Erwin Berkhof | 6, 13 |
| Ford | Focus RS WRC 06 | (United Kingdom) Peter Stephenson | | (United Kingdom) Peter Stephenson | (United Kingdom) Dai Roberts | 13 |
| Ford | Focus RS WRC 04 | (Finland) Clo Racing | P | (Finland) Jouni Arolainen | (Finland) Jouko Puhakka | 1, 8 |
| Mitsubishi | Lancer WRC05 | (Netherlands) Bert De Jong | P | (Netherlands) Bert De Jong | (Netherlands) Ton Hillen | 9 |
| Mitsubishi | Lancer Evo WRC2 | (Netherlands) Henk Vossen | P | (Netherlands) Henk Vossen | (Netherlands) Johan Findhammer | 9 |
| Peugeot | 307 WRC | (Hungary) Synergon Turan Motorsport | P | (Hungary) Frigyes Turán | (Hungary) Gábor Zsiros | 6–7, 11 |
| Peugeot | 307 WRC | (France) Jean-Marie Cuoq | P | (France) Jean-Marie Cuoq | (France) Pascal Duffour | 6 |
| Peugeot | 307 WRC | (Cyprus) Spyros Pavlides | | (Cyprus) Spyros Pavlides | (France) Denis Giraudet | 6 |
| Škoda | Fabia WRC | (Netherlands) Wevers Sport | P | (Netherlands) Erik Wevers | (Netherlands) Michiel Poel | 9 |
| Subaru | Impreza WRC2008 | (Netherlands) Ipatec Racing | P | (Netherlands) René Kuipers | (Netherlands) Erwin Berkhof | 1 |
| Subaru | Impreza WRC2008 | (Netherlands) Ipatec Racing | | (Netherlands) René Kuipers | (Netherlands) Erwin Berkhof | 9 |
| Subaru | Impreza WRC2008 | (Netherlands) Mark van Eldik | P | (Netherlands) Mark van Eldik | (Belgium) Robin Buysmans | 9 |
| Subaru | Impreza WRC2008 | (Netherlands) Edwin Schilt | P | (Netherlands) Edwin Schilt | (Netherlands) Jacco de Kluijver | 9 |
| Subaru | Impreza WRC2008 | (Norway) Adapta World Rally Team | P | (Norway) Mads Østberg | (Sweden) Jonas Andersson | 6 |
| Subaru | Impreza WRC2007 | (Norway) Adapta World Rally Team | P | (Norway) Mads Østberg | (Sweden) Jonas Andersson | 1, 8, 13 |
| Subaru | Impreza WRC2006 | (Netherlands) Gert Huzink | P | (Netherlands) Gert Huzink | (Netherlands) Aaldert Aaltink | 9 |

- – indicates a car running with varying numbers during the season

=== Driver changes ===
- Kimi Raikkonen joined Citroen Junior Team fulltime after leaving Scuderia Ferrari In the FIA Formula One World Championship and making his WRC debut during 2009 Rally Finland.
- Evgenij Novikov and Conrad Rautenbach both left Citroen Junior Team.
- Ken Block joined the series with Monster World Rally Team to contest selected rounds of the season.

=== J-WRC entries ===
| Team | Manufacturer | Car | No | Drivers | Co-drivers | Rounds |
|---|---|---|---|---|---|---|
| (Japan) Suzuki Sport Europe | Suzuki | Swift S1600 | 21 | (Germany) Aaron Burkart | (Germany) Andre Kachel | 4, 6, 9, 11–12 |
| (Netherlands) Knaf Talent First Team Holland | Renault | Clio R3 | 22 | (Netherlands) Kevin Abbring | (Belgium) Erwin Mombaerts | 4, 6–7, 9, 11 |
| (Netherlands) Knaf Talent First Team Holland | Citroën | C2 S1600 | 23 | (Netherlands) Hans Weijs Jr. | (Belgium) Bjorn Degandt | 6–7, 9, 11–12 |
| (Italy) Rubicone Corse | Renault | Clio R3 | 24 | (Spain) Egoi Eder Valdés López | (Spain) Albert Garduno | 6–7, 9, 11–12 |
| (France) Mattei Racing Team | Renault | Clio R3 | 25 | (France) Loic Mattei | (France) Julien Vial | 4 |
| (Bulgaria) Bulbet Rally Team | Renault | Clio R3 | 26 | (Bulgaria) Todor Slavov | (Bulgaria) Dobromir Filipov | 4, 7, 9, 11–12 |
| (Italy) Team Sab Motorsport | Renault | Clio R3 | 27 | (San Marino) Alessandro Broccoli | (Italy) Angela Forina | 4, 6–7, 11–12 |
| (United Kingdom) Harry Hunt Motorsport | Ford | Fiesta R2 | 28 | (United Kingdom) Harry Hunt | (United Kingdom) Sebastian Marshall | 4, 6–7, 11–12 |
| (Belgium) Automeca Rallye & Racing | Citroën | C2 S1600 | 29 | (Belgium) Thierry Neuville | (France) Nicolas Klinger | 4, 6–7, 9, 11 |
| World Rally Team Estonia | Suzuki | Swift S1600 | 30 | (Estonia) Karl Kruuda | (Estonia) Martin Järveoja | 4, 6–7, 9 |
| World Rally Team Estonia | Honda | Civic Type-R R3 | 30 | (Estonia) Martin Kangur | (Estonia) Martin Järveoja | 12 |
| (Italy) GMA Racing | Renault | Clio R3 | 31 | (Spain) Yeray Lemes | (Spain) Rogelio Peňate | 6–7, 9, 11–12 |
| (France) Citroën Junior Team | Citroën | C2 S1600 | 32 | (France) Mathieu Arzeno | (France) Romain Roche | 6–7 |
| (France) Citroën Junior Team | Citroën | C2 S1600 | 32 | (France) Mathieu Arzeno | (Belgium) Renaud Jamoul | 9, 11–12 |
Additional guest entries^{†}
| (Germany) ADAC Weser-Ems | Ford | Fiesta R2 | 149 | (Germany) Christian Riedemann | (Germany) Josefine Beinke | 9 |
| Suzuki France | Suzuki | Swift S1600 | 149 | (France) Jérémi Ancian | (France) Damien Mezy | 11 |
| (Spain) Escudería La Selva | Peugeot | 206 S1600 | 49 | (Spain) Climent Domingo | (Spain) Joan Venceslao | 12 |

=== S-WRC entries ===
| Team | Manufacturer | Car | No | Drivers | Co-drivers | Rounds |
|---|---|---|---|---|---|---|
| (Czech Republic) Czech Ford National Team | Ford | Fiesta S2000 | 21 | (Czech Republic) Martin Prokop | (Czech Republic) Jan Tománek | 1–2, 5, 8–9, 11 |
| (Czech Republic) Czech Ford National Team | Škoda | Fabia S2000 | 21 | (Norway) Andreas Mikkelsen | (Norway) Ola Fløene | 13 |
| (Qatar) Barwa Rally Team | Škoda | Fabia S2000 | 22 | (Qatar) Nasser Al-Attiyah | (Italy) Giovanni Bernacchini | 2–3, 5 |
| (Qatar) Barwa Rally Team | Ford | Fabia S2000 | 22 | (Qatar) Nasser Al-Attiyah | (Italy) Giovanni Bernacchini | 6, 8 |
| (Qatar) Barwa Rally Team | Ford | Fabia S2000 | 22 | (Czech Republic) Martin Prokop | (Czech Republic) Jan Tománek | 10 |
| (Qatar) Barwa Rally Team | Ford | Fabia S2000 | 22 | (Republic of Ireland) Craig Breen | (United Kingdom) Gareth Roberts | 13 |
| (Poland) Dynamic World Rally Team | Ford | Fabia S2000 | 23 | (Poland) Michał Kościuszko | (Poland) Maciek Szczepaniak | 2–3 |
| (Poland) Dynamic World Rally Team | Škoda | Fabia S2000 | 23 | (Poland) Michał Kościuszko | (Poland) Maciek Szczepaniak | 6, 8–9, 11, 13 |
| (Austria) Red Bull Rallye Team | Škoda | Fabia S2000 | 24 | (Sweden) Patrik Sandell | (Sweden) Emil Axelsson | 1, 3, 5, 8–9, 11, 13 |
| (Belgium) Rene Georges Rally Sport | Škoda | Fabia S2000 | 25 | (Norway) Eyvind Brynildsen | (Norway) Cato Menkerud | 1–3, 6, 9, 11, 13 |
| (Portugal) Team Ford/Quinta Do Lorde | Ford | Fiesta S2000 | 26 | (Portugal) Bernardo Sousa | (Portugal) Nuno Rodrigues Da Silva | 1, 3, 6, 9–11, 13 |
| (Finland) Janpro | Ford | Fiesta S2000 | 27 | (Finland) Janne Tuohino | (Finland) Markku Tuohino | 1, 3, 5 |
| (Finland) Janpro | Ford | Fiesta S2000 | 27 | (Finland) Janne Tuohino | (Finland) Risto Pietiläinen | 6, 9 |
| (Finland) Janpro | Ford | Fiesta S2000 | 27 | (Finland) Janne Tuohino | (Finland) Marko Sallinen | 8 |
| (Spain) Nupel Global Racing | Ford | Fiesta S2000 | 28 | (Spain) Xavier Pons | (Spain) Alex Haro | 2–3, 5–6, 9, 11, 13 |
| (China) Shanghai FCACA Rally Team | Ford | Fiesta S2000 | 29 | (Finland) Jari Ketomaa | (Finland) Mika Stenberg | 3, 5–6, 8, 10–11, 13 |
| (Spain) PCR Sport | Fiat | Abarth Grande Punto S2000 | 30 | (Andorra) Albert Llovera | (Spain) Borja Rozada | 2, 5–6, 8–9, 11, 13 |
| (Slovakia) Rufa Sport | Škoda | Fabia S2000 | 53 | (Sweden) Per-Gunnar Andersson | (Sweden) Jonas Andersson | 3 |
| (Slovakia) Rufa Sport | Škoda | Fabia S2000 | 53 | (Sweden) Per-Gunnar Andersson | (Sweden) Anders Fredriksson | 6, 8–9, 11 |
| (Slovakia) Rufa Sport | Toyota | Auris S2000 | 53 | (Czech Republic) Roman Pešek | (Czech Republic) Vit Housť | 10 |
| (United Kingdom) Stobart M-Sport Ford Rally Team | Ford | Fiesta S2000 | 56 | (Norway) Mads Østberg | (Sweden) Jonas Andersson | 9, 11 |
| (United Kingdom) Stobart M-Sport Ford Rally Team | Ford | Fiesta S2000 | 56 | (Norway) Henning Solberg | (Austria) Ilka Minor | 7, 9 |
| (United Kingdom) Stobart M-Sport Ford Rally Team | Ford | Fiesta S2000 | 56 | (Norway) Henning Solberg | (Belgium) Stéphane Prévot | 11-12 |
| (United Kingdom) Stobart M-Sport Ford Rally Team | Ford | Fiesta S2000 | 56 | (Netherlands) Dennis Kuipers | (Belgium) Frédéric Miclotte | 4, 6–9, 11–13 |
Additional guest entries^{†}
| (Czech Republic) JM Racing | Škoda | Fabia S2000 | 49 | (Sweden) Per-Gunnar Andersson | (Sweden) Anders Fredriksson | 1 |
| (Sweden) NH Super 2000 | Škoda | Fabia S2000 | 51 | (Sweden) Per-Arne Sääv | (Sweden) Karl-Olof Lexe | 1 |
| (Portugal) Amarante Rally Team | Peugeot | 207 S2000 | 49 | (Portugal) Vitor Pascoal | (Portugal) Mário Castro | 6 |
| (Austria) Baumschlager Rallye & Racing | Škoda | Fabia S2000 | 51 | (Finland) Juho Hänninen | (Finland) Mikko Markkula | 8 |
| Rally Drive Finland | Škoda | Fabia S2000 | 52 | (Finland) Matti Rantanen | (Finland) Mikko Lukka | 8 |
| (France) Team 2C Compétition | Peugeot | 207 S2000 | 49 | (France) Jean-Sébastien Vigion | (France) Tibo Gorczyca | 11 |
| (France) Team Emap Yacco | Ford | Fiesta S2000 | 50 | (France) Julien Maurin | (France) Gilles Thimonnier | 11 |

=== P-WRC entries ===
| Manufacturer | No | Drivers | Co-drivers | Car | Rounds |
|---|---|---|---|---|---|
| Mitsubishi | 31 | (Portugal) Armindo Araújo | (Portugal) Miguel Ramalho | Lancer Evo X | 1–3, 9, 11, 13 |
| Subaru | 32 | (Japan) Toshi Arai | (United Kingdom) Daniel Barritt | Impreza WRX STI | 2, 5, 9–11, 13 |
| Subaru | 33 | (Italy) Gianluca Linari | (Italy) Paolo Gregoriani | Impreza WRX STI | 1–2, 5 |
| Subaru | 33 | (Italy) Gianluca Linari | (Italy) Massimo Salvucci | Impreza WRX STI | 10–11, 13 |
| Mitsubishi | 34 | (Czech Republic) Martin Semerád | (Czech Republic) Bohuslav Ceplecha | Lancer Evo IX | 1, 3 |
| Mitsubishi | 34 | (Czech Republic) Martin Semerád | (Czech Republic) Michal Ernst | Lancer Evo IX | 8–9 |
| Mitsubishi | 34 | (Czech Republic) Martin Semerád | (Czech Republic) Michal Ernst | Lancer Evo X | 13 |
| Mitsubishi | 34 | (New Zealand) Kingsley Thompson | (New Zealand) Malcolm Peden | Lancer Evo X | 5 |
| Subaru | 35 | (Hungary) Gábor Mayer | (Hungary) Róbert Tagai | Impreza WRX STI | 2 |
| Mitsubishi | 36 | (Lebanon) Nicholai Georgiou | (Lebanon) Joseph Matar | Lancer Evo X | 3, 8–9, 11, 13 |
| Mitsubishi | 36 | (Lebanon) Nicholai Georgiou | (Lebanon) Joseph Matar | Lancer Evo IX | 5 |
| Mitsubishi | 37 | (Kenya) Peter Horsey | (United Kingdom) Calvin Cooledge | Lancer Evo X | 8–9, 11, 13 |
| Mitsubishi | 38 | (New Zealand) Hayden Paddon | (New Zealand) John Kennard | Lancer Evo IX | 5, 10 |
| Mitsubishi | 38 | (New Zealand) Hayden Paddon | (New Zealand) John Kennard | Lancer Evo X | 8–9, 11, 13 |
| Mitsubishi | 39 | (San Marino) Alex Raschi | (Italy) Rudy Pollet | Lancer Evo X | 8–9 |
| Mitsubishi | 39 | (San Marino) Alex Raschi | (San Marino) Silvio Stefanelli | Lancer Evo X | 11, 13 |
| Subaru | 40 | (New Zealand) Richard Mason | (New Zealand) Sara Mason | Impreza WRX STI | 5 |
| Mitsubishi | 40 | (Estonia) Ott Tänak | (Estonia) Kuldar Sikk | Lancer Evo X | 8–9, 11, 13 |
| Mitsubishi | 41 | (Italy) Fabio Frisiero | (Spain) Jordi Costa | Lancer Evo IX | 1, 5 |
| Mitsubishi | 41 | (Italy) Fabio Frisiero | (Italy) Simone Scattolin | Lancer Evo IX | 11 |
| Mitsubishi | 41 | (Italy) Giorgio Bacco | (Italy) Giovanni Agnese | Lancer Evo IX | 2 |
| Subaru | 41 | (Italy) Alessandro Bruschetta | (Italy) Edoardo Civiero | Impreza WRX STI | 8 |
| Mitsubishi | 41 | (Italy) Giovanni Manfrinato | (Italy) Maurizio Barone | Lancer Evo X | 13 |
| Mitsubishi | 42 | (Argentina) Miguel Baldoni | (Argentina) José Díaz | Lancer Evo IX | 2, 5, 8 |
| Mitsubishi | 43 | (Finland) Reijo Muhonen | (Finland) Lasse Miettinen | Lancer Evo X | 1, 3 |
| Mitsubishi | 43 | (Finland) Reijo Muhonen | (Finland) Miika Teiskonen | Lancer Evo X | 8, 10 |
| Mitsubishi | 55 | (Finland) Reijo Muhonen | (Finland) Juha Kanerva | Lancer Evo X | 9, 13 |
| Mitsubishi | 44 | (Brazil) Paulo Nobre | (Brazil) Edu Paula | Lancer Evo X | 1, 3, 5, 8, 10, 13 |
| Subaru | 45 | (China) Rui Wang | (China) Hongyu Pan | Impreza WRX STI | 3, 5 |
| Subaru | 45 | (China) Rui Wang | (China) Yiping Chen | Impreza WRX STI | 8, 10–11, 13 |
| Subaru | 46 | (Norway) Anders Grøndal | (Norway) Veronica Engan | Impreza WRX STI | 1, 8, 11, 13 |
| Subaru | 46 | (China) Liu Caodong | (Australia) Anthony McLoughlin | Impreza WRX STI | 5 |
| Mitsubishi | 46 | (Japan) Kyosuke Kamata | (Japan) Takumi Takahashi | Lancer Evo IX | 10 |
| Subaru | 47 | (Cyprus) Spyros Pavlides | (United Kingdom) Chris Patterson | Impreza WRX STI | 3 |
| Subaru | 47 | (Cyprus) Spyros Pavlides | (France) Denis Giraudet | Impreza WRX STI | 13 |
| Subaru | 47 | (Portugal) Nuno Barroso Pereira | (Portugal) Pedro Conde | Impreza WRX STI | 8–9 |
| Subaru | 47 | (Portugal) Nuno Barroso Pereira | (Portugal) Luis Ramalho | Impreza WRX STI | 11 |
| Subaru | 47 | (Japan) Shuhei Muta | (Japan) Naoya Tanaka | Impreza WRX STI | 10 |
| Subaru | 48 | (Sweden) Patrik Flodin | (Sweden) Göran Bergsten | Impreza WRX STI | 3, 8–10, 13 |
| Subaru | 48 | (United Kingdom) Dave Weston Jr. | (United Kingdom) Ieuan Thomas | Impreza WRX STI | 11 |
| Mitsubishi | 54 | (Mexico) Michel Jourdain Jr. | (Spain) Óscar Sánchez | Lancer Evo IX | 5, 8, 10 |
| Mitsubishi | 54 | (Mexico) Michel Jourdain Jr. | (Spain) Óscar Sánchez | Lancer Evo X | 9, 11, 13 |
| | Additional guest entries^{†} | | | | |
| Subaru | 50 | (Sweden) Patrik Flodin | (Sweden) Göran Bergsten | Impreza WRX STI | 1 |
| Mitsubishi | 52 | (Sweden) Joakim Nyman | (Sweden) Bosse Holmstrand | Lancer Evo IX | 1 |
| Mitsubishi | 49 | (Mexico) Benito Guerra | (Mexico) Javier Marín | Lancer Evo IX | 2 |
| Mitsubishi | 50 | (Mexico) Rodrigo Salgado | (Mexico) Diodoro Salgado | Lancer Evo IX | 2 |
| Subaru | 49 | (Jordan) Amjad Farrah | (Jordan) Nancy Al-Majali | Impreza WRX STI | 3 |
| Subaru | 50 | (New Zealand) Emma Gilmour | (Australia) Glenn MacNeall | Impreza WRX STI | 5 |
| Mitsubishi | 49 | (Finland) Juha Salo | (Finland) Jarkko Kalliolepo | Lancer Evo X | 8 |
| Mitsubishi | 50 | (Finland) Jukka Ketomäki | (Finland) Kai Risberg | Lancer Evo X | 8 |
| Mitsubishi | 49 | (Germany) Hermann Gassner Jr. | (Germany) Katharina Wustenhagen | Lancer Evo IX | 9 |
| Mitsubishi | 50 | (Germany) Florian Niegel | (Germany) Thomas Fuchs | Lancer Evo IX | 9 |
| Subaru | 49 | (United Kingdom) Dave Weston Jr. | (United Kingdom) Ieuan Thomas | Impreza WRX STI | 13 |
| Subaru | 50 | (United Kingdom) Jason Pritchard | (United Kingdom) Robbie Durant | Impreza WRX STI | 13 |

† – At each rally, the organiser may nominate two "guest drivers" from their country to score support category points.

== Results and standings ==
=== Results ===
| Colour | Rally Surface |
|---|---|
| Gold | Gravel |
| Silver | Tarmac |
| Blue | Snow/Ice |
| Bronze | Mixed Surface |

| Round | Rally name | Podium finishers | | | | Statistics | | | |
| Round | Rally name | Rank | Driver | Car | Time | Stages | Length | Starters | Finishers |
|---|---|---|---|---|---|---|---|---|---|
| 1 | (Sweden) Swedish Rally (11–14 February) — Results and report | 1 | (Finland) Mikko Hirvonen | Ford Focus RS WRC 09 | 3:09:30.4 | 21 | 345.15 km | 55 | 43 |
| 1 | (Sweden) Swedish Rally (11–14 February) — Results and report | 2 | (France) Sébastien Loeb | Citroën C4 WRC | 3:10:12.7 | 21 | 345.15 km | 55 | 43 |
| 1 | (Sweden) Swedish Rally (11–14 February) — Results and report | 3 | (Finland) Jari-Matti Latvala | Ford Focus RS WRC 09 | 3:10:45.8 | 21 | 345.15 km | 55 | 43 |
| 2 | Rally Mexico (5–7 March) — Results and report | 1 | (France) Sébastien Loeb | Citroën C4 WRC | 3:42:41.7 | 22 | 354.60 km | 30 | 25 |
| 2 | Rally Mexico (5–7 March) — Results and report | 2 | (Norway) Petter Solberg | Citroën C4 WRC | 3:43:05.9 | 22 | 354.60 km | 30 | 25 |
| 2 | Rally Mexico (5–7 March) — Results and report | 3 | (France) Sébastien Ogier | Citroën C4 WRC | 3:43:07.0 | 22 | 354.60 km | 30 | 25 |
| 3 | Jordan Rally (1–3 April) — Results and report | 1 | (France) Sébastien Loeb | Citroën C4 WRC | 3:51:35.9 | 21 | 339.48 km | 33 | 27 |
| 3 | Jordan Rally (1–3 April) — Results and report | 2 | (Finland) Jari-Matti Latvala | Ford Focus RS WRC 09 | 3:52:11.7 | 21 | 339.48 km | 33 | 27 |
| 3 | Jordan Rally (1–3 April) — Results and report | 3 | (Norway) Petter Solberg | Citroën C4 WRC | 3:52:47.7 | 21 | 339.48 km | 33 | 27 |
| 4 | Rally of Turkey (16–18 April) — Results and report | 1 | (France) Sébastien Loeb | Citroën C4 WRC | 3:01:38.7 | 23 | 358.84 km | 40 | 32 |
| 4 | Rally of Turkey (16–18 April) — Results and report | 2 | (Norway) Petter Solberg | Citroën C4 WRC | 3:02:33.2 | 23 | 358.84 km | 40 | 32 |
| 4 | Rally of Turkey (16–18 April) — Results and report | 3 | (Finland) Mikko Hirvonen | Ford Focus RS WRC 09 | 3:03:22.1 | 23 | 358.84 km | 40 | 32 |
| 5 | Rally New Zealand (7–9 May) — Results and report | 1 | (Finland) Jari-Matti Latvala | Ford Focus RS WRC 09 | 4:04:09.8 | 21 | 396.50 km | 53 | 38 |
| 5 | Rally New Zealand (7–9 May) — Results and report | 2 | (France) Sébastien Ogier | Citroën C4 WRC | 4:04:12.2 | 21 | 396.50 km | 53 | 38 |
| 5 | Rally New Zealand (7–9 May) — Results and report | 3 | (France) Sébastien Loeb | Citroën C4 WRC | 4:04:25.0 | 21 | 396.50 km | 53 | 38 |
| 6 | Rally de Portugal (28–30 May) — Results and report | 1 | (France) Sébastien Ogier | Citroën C4 WRC | 3:51:16.1 | 18 | 355.32 km | 74 | 52 |
| 6 | Rally de Portugal (28–30 May) — Results and report | 2 | (France) Sébastien Loeb | Citroën C4 WRC | 3:51:24.0 | 18 | 355.32 km | 74 | 52 |
| 6 | Rally de Portugal (28–30 May) — Results and report | 3 | (Spain) Dani Sordo | Citroën C4 WRC | 3:52:33.7 | 18 | 355.32 km | 74 | 52 |
| 7 | Rally Bulgaria (9–11 July) — Results and report | 1 | (France) Sébastien Loeb | Citroën C4 WRC | 3:02:39.2 | 14 | 354.10 km | 40 | 28 |
| 7 | Rally Bulgaria (9–11 July) — Results and report | 2 | (Spain) Dani Sordo | Citroën C4 WRC | 3:03:08.7 | 14 | 354.10 km | 40 | 28 |
| 7 | Rally Bulgaria (9–11 July) — Results and report | 3 | (Norway) Petter Solberg | Citroën C4 WRC | 3:03:15.5 | 14 | 354.10 km | 40 | 28 |
| 8 | Rally Finland (29–31 July) — Results and report | 1 | (Finland) Jari-Matti Latvala | Ford Focus RS WRC 09 | 2:31:29.6 | 19 | 310.29 km | 99 | 61 |
| 8 | Rally Finland (29–31 July) — Results and report | 2 | (France) Sébastien Ogier | Citroën C4 WRC | 2:31:39.7 | 19 | 310.29 km | 99 | 61 |
| 8 | Rally Finland (29–31 July) — Results and report | 3 | (France) Sébastien Loeb | Citroën C4 WRC | 2:31:55.6 | 19 | 310.29 km | 99 | 61 |
| 9 | (Germany) Rallye Deutschland (20–22 August) — Results and report | 1 | (France) Sébastien Loeb | Citroën C4 WRC | 3:59:38.3 | 19 | 407.25 km | 77 | 55 |
| 9 | (Germany) Rallye Deutschland (20–22 August) — Results and report | 2 | (Spain) Dani Sordo | Citroën C4 WRC | 4:00:29.6 | 19 | 407.25 km | 77 | 55 |
| 9 | (Germany) Rallye Deutschland (20–22 August) — Results and report | 3 | (France) Sébastien Ogier | Citroën C4 WRC | 4:01:51.6 | 19 | 407.25 km | 77 | 55 |
| 10 | Rally Japan (10–12 September) — Results and report | 1 | (France) Sébastien Ogier | Citroën C4 WRC | 3:10:26.4 | 26 | 303.54 km | 70 | 54 |
| 10 | Rally Japan (10–12 September) — Results and report | 2 | (Norway) Petter Solberg | Citroën C4 WRC | 3:10:42.1 | 26 | 303.54 km | 70 | 54 |
| 10 | Rally Japan (10–12 September) — Results and report | 3 | (Finland) Jari-Matti Latvala | Ford Focus RS WRC 09 | 3:10:52.4 | 26 | 303.54 km | 70 | 54 |
| 11 | Rallye de France Alsace (30 September – 3 October) — Results and report | 1 | (France) Sébastien Loeb | Citroën C4 WRC | 3:05:49.3 | 20 | 351.80 km | 66 | 49 |
| 11 | Rallye de France Alsace (30 September – 3 October) — Results and report | 2 | (Spain) Dani Sordo | Citroën C4 WRC | 3:06:25.0 | 20 | 351.80 km | 66 | 49 |
| 11 | Rallye de France Alsace (30 September – 3 October) — Results and report | 3 | (Norway) Petter Solberg | Citroën C4 WRC | 3:07:06.1 | 20 | 351.80 km | 66 | 49 |
| 12 | (Spain) Rally Catalunya (22–24 October) — Results and report | 1 | (France) Sébastien Loeb | Citroën C4 WRC | 3:32:59.7 | 16 | 355,30 km | 45 | 36 |
| 12 | (Spain) Rally Catalunya (22–24 October) — Results and report | 2 | (Norway) Petter Solberg | Citroën C4 WRC | 3:33:35.0 | 16 | 355,30 km | 45 | 36 |
| 12 | (Spain) Rally Catalunya (22–24 October) — Results and report | 3 | (Spain) Dani Sordo | Citroën C4 WRC | 3:33:40.8 | 16 | 355,30 km | 45 | 36 |
| 13 | (United Kingdom) Wales Rally GB (11–14 November) — Results and report | 1 | (France) Sébastien Loeb | Citroën C4 WRC | 3:14:54.0 | 20 | 359.44 km | 60 | 45 |
| 13 | (United Kingdom) Wales Rally GB (11–14 November) — Results and report | 2 | (Norway) Petter Solberg | Citroën C4 WRC | 3:15:13.1 | 20 | 359.44 km | 60 | 45 |
| 13 | (United Kingdom) Wales Rally GB (11–14 November) — Results and report | 3 | (Finland) Jari-Matti Latvala | Ford Focus RS WRC 09 | 3:16:29.3 | 20 | 359.44 km | 60 | 45 |

=== Standings ===
==== Drivers' championship ====
| Pos. | Driver | SWE (Sweden) | MEX (Mexico) | JOR (Jordan) | TUR (Turkey) | NZL (New Zealand) | POR (Portugal) | BUL (Bulgaria) | FIN (Finland) | GER (Germany) | JPN (Japan) | FRA (France) | ESP (Spain) | GBR (United Kingdom) | Pts |
|---|---|---|---|---|---|---|---|---|---|---|---|---|---|---|---|
| 1 | (France) Sébastien Loeb | 2 | 1 | 1 | 1 | 3 | 2 | 1 | 3 | 1 | 5 | 1 | 1 | 1 | 276 |
| 2 | (Finland) Jari-Matti Latvala | 3 | 5 | 2 | 8 | 1 | Ret | 6 | 1 | 4 | 3 | 4 | 4 | 3 | 171 |
| 3 | (Norway) Petter Solberg | 9 | 2 | 3 | 2 | Ret | 5 | 3 | 4 | 5 | 2 | 3 | 2 | 2 | 169 |
| 4 | (France) Sébastien Ogier | 5 | 3 | 6 | 4 | 2 | 1 | 4 | 2 | 3 | 1 | 6 | 10 | Ret | 167 |
| 5 | (Spain) Dani Sordo | 4 | 14 | 4 | Ret | 5 | 3 | 2 | 5 | 2 | 4 | 2 | 3 | 5 | 150 |
| 6 | (Finland) Mikko Hirvonen | 1 | 4 | 20 | 3 | 4 | 4 | 5 | Ret | Ret | 6 | 5 | 5 | 4 | 126 |
| 7 | (United Kingdom) Matthew Wilson | 7 | 16 | 5 | 7 | 6 | 6 | 9 | 6 | 6 | 22 | 8 | 6 | 7 | 74 |
| 8 | (Norway) Henning Solberg | 6 | 6 | 9 | 25 | 7 | Ret | 10 | Ret | 37 | 7 | 9 | 8 | 6 | 45 |
| 9 | (Argentina) Federico Villagra | | 7 | 7 | 6 | 9 | 8 | | | | 8 | 7 | 15 | | 36 |
| 10 | (Finland) Kimi Räikkönen | 29 | Ret | 8 | 5 | | 10 | 11 | 25 | 7 | Ret | Ret | DNS | 8 | 25 |
| 11 | (Norway) Mads Østberg | 8 | | | | | 7 | | 7 | 16 | | 41 | | 9 | 18 |
| 12 | (United Arab Emirates) Khalid Al Qassimi | 13 | | DNS | | | 9 | | Ret | 8 | Ret | 13 | 7 | 11 | 12 |
| 13 | (Sweden) Per-Gunnar Andersson | 10 | | 16 | | | 16 | 7 | 10 | 13 | | | | | 8 |
| 14 | (Finland) Jari Ketomaa | | | 25 | | 8 | 11 | | Ret | | 9 | 11 | | Ret | 6 |
| 15 | (Spain) Xavier Pons | | 8 | 10 | | 10 | 12 | | | 15 | | 15 | DNS | 13 | 6 |
| 16 | (Hungary) Frigyes Turán | | | | | | 23 | 8 | | | | Ret | Ret | | 4 |
| 17 | (Finland) Juha Kankkunen | | | | | | | | 8 | | | | | | 4 |
| 18 | (Czech Republic) Martin Prokop | 14 | 9 | | | 11 | | | 13 | 11 | 10 | 21 | | | 3 |
| 19 | (Netherlands) Dennis Kuipers | 37 | | | 9 | | 19 | 13 | Ret | 24 | | 17 | 11 | 16 | 2 |
| 20 | (United States) Ken Block | | 18 | | 24 | | Ret | | | Ret | | 12 | 9 | 21 | 2 |
| 21 | (Finland) Juho Hänninen | | | | | | Ret | | 9 | | | | | | 2 |
| 22 | (Netherlands) Mark van Eldik | | | | | | | | | 9 | | | | | 2 |
| 23 | (Sweden) Patrik Sandell | 15 | | 23 | | 12 | | | 11 | 10 | | 10 | | 14 | 2 |
| 24 | (Norway) Andreas Mikkelsen | 11 | | | | | | | | | | 18 | | 10 | 1 |
| 25 | (Portugal) Armindo Araújo | 23 | 10 | 12 | | | 14 | | | 18 | | 16 | | 18 | 1 |
| 26 | (Germany) Aaron Burkart | | | | 10 | | 32 | | | 26 | | 36 | 26 | | 1 |
| Pos. | Driver | SWE (Sweden) | MEX (Mexico) | JOR (Jordan) | TUR (Turkey) | NZL (New Zealand) | POR (Portugal) | BUL (Bulgaria) | FIN (Finland) | GER (Germany) | JPN (Japan) | FRA (France) | ESP (Spain) | GBR (United Kingdom) | Pts |

Key
| Colour | Result |
|---|---|
| Gold | Winner |
| Silver | 2nd place |
| Bronze | 3rd place |
| Green | Points finish |
| Blue | Non-points finish |
| Blue | Non-classified finish (NC) |
| Purple | Did not finish (Ret) |
| Black | Excluded (EX) |
| Black | Disqualified (DSQ) |
| White | Did not start (DNS) |
| White | Cancelled (C) |
| Blank | Withdrew entry from the event (WD) |

==== Manufacturers' championship ====
| Pos. | Manufacturer | No. | SWE (Sweden) | MEX (Mexico) | JOR (Jordan) | TUR (Turkey) | NZL (New Zealand) | POR (Portugal) | BUL (Bulgaria) | FIN (Finland) | GER (Germany) | JPN (Japan) | FRA (France) | ESP (Spain) | GBR (United Kingdom) | Points |
|---|---|---|---|---|---|---|---|---|---|---|---|---|---|---|---|---|
| 1 | (France) Citroën Total World Rally Team | 1 | 2 | 1 | 1 | 1 | 2 | 2 | 1 | 3 | 1 | 4 | 1 | 1 | 1 | 456 |
| 1 | (France) Citroën Total World Rally Team | 2 | 4 | 7 | 3 | Ret | 4 | 3 | 2 | 2 | 2 | 1 | 2 | 2 | Ret | 456 |
| 2 | (United Kingdom) BP Ford World Rally Team | 3 | 1 | 3 | 9 | 2 | 3 | 4 | 4 | Ret | Ret | 5 | 4 | 4 | 3 | 337 |
| 2 | (United Kingdom) BP Ford World Rally Team | 4 | 3 | 4 | 2 | 7 | 1 | Ret | 5 | 1 | 4 | 2 | 3 | 3 | 2 | 337 |
| 3 | (France) Citroën Junior Team | 7 | 5 | 2 | 5 | 3 | | 1 | 3 | 4 | 3 | 3 | 5 | 7 | 4 | 217 |
| 3 | (France) Citroën Junior Team | 8 | 8 | Ret | 7 | 4 | | 7 | 8 | 6 | 6 | Ret | Ret | Ret | 7 | 217 |
| 4 | (United Kingdom) Stobart M-Sport Ford Rally Team | 5 | 7 | 8 | 4 | 6 | 5 | 5 | 7 | 5 | 5 | 8 | 7 | 5 | 6 | 176 |
| 4 | (United Kingdom) Stobart M-Sport Ford Rally Team | 6 | 6 | 5 | 8 | 8 | 6 | Ret | 6 | Ret | Ret | 6 | | | 5 | 176 |
| 4 | (United Kingdom) Stobart M-Sport Ford Rally Team | 43 | | | | | | | | | | | 8 | 6 | | 176 |
| 5 | (Argentina) Munchi's Ford World Rally Team | 9 | | 6 | 6 | 5 | 7 | 6 | | | | 7 | 6 | 8 | | 58 |
| Pos. | Manufacturer | No. | SWE (Sweden) | MEX (Mexico) | JOR (Jordan) | TUR (Turkey) | NZL (New Zealand) | POR (Portugal) | BUL (Bulgaria) | FIN (Finland) | GER (Germany) | JPN (Japan) | FRA (France) | ESP (Spain) | GBR (United Kingdom) | Points |

Key
| Colour | Result |
|---|---|
| Gold | Winner |
| Silver | 2nd place |
| Bronze | 3rd place |
| Green | Points finish |
| Blue | Non-points finish |
| Blue | Non-classified finish (NC) |
| Purple | Did not finish (Ret) |
| Black | Excluded (EX) |
| Black | Disqualified (DSQ) |
| White | Did not start (DNS) |
| White | Cancelled (C) |
| Blank | Withdrew entry from the event (WD) |

==== JWRC Drivers' championship ====
| Pos. | Driver | TUR (Turkey) | POR (Portugal) | BUL (Bulgaria) | GER (Germany) | FRA (France) | ESP (Spain) | Pts |
|---|---|---|---|---|---|---|---|---|
| 1 | (Germany) Aaron Burkart | 1 | 3 | | 2 | 5 | 4 | 80 |
| 2 | (Netherlands) Hans Weijs Jr. | | Ret | 2 | 1 | 2 | 3 | 76 |
| 3 | (Bulgaria) Todor Slavov | 4 | | 3 | 7 | 6 | 2 | 59 |
| 4 | (Estonia) Karl Kruuda | 6 | 2 | 5 | 3 | | | 51 |
| 5 | (Netherlands) Kevin Abbring | 3 | 1 | 7 | Ret | Ret | | 46 |
| 6 | (Spain) Yeray Lemes Macias | | 4 | EX | 6 | Ret | 1 | 45 |
| 7 | (Belgium) Thierry Neuville | Ret | Ret | 1 | Ret | 3 | | 40 |
| 8 | (United Kingdom) Harry Hunt | 5 | 6 | Ret | | 7 | 5 | 34 |
| 9 | (San Marino) Alessandro Broccoli | 2 | Ret | 4 | | Ret | Ret | 30 |
| 10 | (France) Jérémi Ancian | | | | | 1 | | 25 |
| 11 | (France) Mathieu Arzeno | | Ret | 8 | Ret | 4 | Ret | 16 |
| 12 | (Germany) Christian Riedemann | | | | 4 | | | 12 |
| 13 | (Estonia) Martin Kangur | | | | | | 6 | 8 |
| 14 | (Spain) Egoi Eder Valdes Lopez | | 5 | 6 | 5 | | | 0† |
| Pos. | Driver | TUR (Turkey) | POR (Portugal) | BUL (Bulgaria) | GER (Germany) | FRA (France) | ESP (Spain) | Pts |

Notes

† Egoi Eder Valdes Lopez has been removed from the Classification.

==== SWRC Drivers' championship ====
| Pos. | Driver | SWE (Sweden) | MEX (Mexico) | JOR (Jordan) | NZL (New Zealand) | POR (Portugal) | FIN (Finland) | GER (Germany) | JPN (Japan) | FRA (France) | GBR (United Kingdom) | Pts |
|---|---|---|---|---|---|---|---|---|---|---|---|---|
| 1 | (Spain) Xavier Pons | | 1 | 1 | 2 | 2 | | 5 | | 4 | 3 | 123 |
| 2 | (Sweden) Patrik Sandell | 4 | | 5 | 4 | | 3 | 1 | | 1 | 4 | 111 |
| 3 | (Czech Republic) Martin Prokop | 3 | 2 | | 3 | | 4 | 2 | 2 | 6 | | 104 |
| 4 | (Finland) Jari Ketomaa | | | 6 | 1 | 1 | Ret | | 1 | 2 | Ret | 101 |
| 5 | (Poland) Michał Kościuszko | | 3 | Ret | | 3 | 5 | 6 | | 3 | 5 | 73 |
| 6 | (Norway) Eyvind Brynildsen | 5 | 4 | 2 | | 9 | | 4 | | 5 | Ret | 64 |
| 7 | (Qatar) Nasser Al-Attiyah | | Ret | 4 | 5 | 7 | 7 | | | | | 34 |
| 8 | (Portugal) Bernardo Sousa | 6 | | EX | | 4 | | 7 | Ret | 7 | Ret | 32 |
| 9 | (Sweden) Per-Gunnar Andersson | 1 | | 3 | | 5 | 2 | 3 | | | | 25† |
| 10 | (Finland) Juho Hänninen | | | | | | 1 | | | | | 25 |
| 11 | (Norway) Andreas Mikkelsen | | | | | | | | | | 1 | 25 |
| 12 | (Republic of Ireland) Craig Breen | | | | | | | | | | 2 | 18 |
| 13 | (Andorra) Albert Llovera | | 5 | | Ret | 10 | Ret | 8 | | 9 | | 17 |
| 14 | (Portugal) Vitor Pascoal | | | | | 6 | | | | | | 8 |
| 15 | (Sweden) Per-Arne Sääv | 7 | | | | | | | | | | 6 |
| 16 | (France) Julien Maurin | | | | | | | | | 8 | | 4 |
| 17 | (Finland) Janne Tuohino | 2 | | Ret | Ret | 8 | 6 | | | | | 0‡ |
| Pos. | Driver | SWE (Sweden) | MEX (Mexico) | JOR (Jordan) | NZL (New Zealand) | POR (Portugal) | FIN (Finland) | GER (Germany) | JPN (Japan) | FRA (France) | GBR (United Kingdom) | Pts |

Key
| Colour | Result |
|---|---|
| Gold | Winner |
| Silver | 2nd place |
| Bronze | 3rd place |
| Green | Points finish |
| Blue | Non-points finish |
| Blue | Non-classified finish (NC) |
| Purple | Did not finish (Ret) |
| Black | Excluded (EX) |
| Black | Disqualified (DSQ) |
| White | Did not start (DNS) |
| White | Cancelled (C) |
| Blank | Withdrew entry from the event (WD) |

Notes

† Andersson's entrant RUFA Sport failed to compete in the required number of events, meaning all of Andersson's points scored with the team have been annulled. His win in Sweden remains as he competed as a wildcard entrant and not with RUFA.

‡ Tuohino has not completed the season due to a lack of budget, which resulted in the FIA excluding him from the championship.

==== WRC Cup for Super 2000 Teams championship ====
| Pos. | Team | SWE (Sweden) | MEX (Mexico) | JOR (Jordan) | NZL (New Zealand) | POR (Portugal) | FIN (Finland) | GER (Germany) | JPN (Japan) | FRA (France) | GBR (United Kingdom) | Pts |
|---|---|---|---|---|---|---|---|---|---|---|---|---|
| 1 | (Austria) Red Bull Rally Team | 15 | | 12 | 12 | | 25 | 25 | | 25 | 12 | 126 |
| 2 | (Spain) Nupel Global Racing | | 25 | 25 | 18 | 18 | | 12 | | 12 | 15 | 125 |
| 3 | (Czech Republic) Czech Ford National Team | 18 | 18 | | 15 | | 18 | 18 | | 8 | 25 | 120 |
| 4 | (China) Shanghai FCACA Rally Team | | | 10 | 25 | 25 | 0 | | 25 | 18 | 0 | 103 |
| 5 | (Qatar) Barwa Rally Team | | 0 | 15 | 10 | 10 | 10 | | 18 | | 18 | 81 |
| 6 | (Poland) Dynamic World Rally Team | | 15 | 0 | | 15 | 15 | 10 | | 15 | 10 | 80 |
| 7 | (Belgium) Rene Georges Rally Sport | 12 | 12 | 18 | | 6 | | 15 | | 10 | 0 | 73 |
| 8 | (Portugal) Team Ford/Quinta Do Lorde | 10 | | 0 | | 12 | | 8 | 0 | 6 | 0 | 36 |
| 9 | (Finland) Janpro | 25 | | 0 | 0 | 8 | 12 | | | | | 0‡ |
| Pos. | Team | SWE (Sweden) | MEX (Mexico) | JOR (Jordan) | NZL (New Zealand) | POR (Portugal) | FIN (Finland) | GER (Germany) | JPN (Japan) | FRA (France) | GBR (United Kingdom) | Pts |

==== PWRC Drivers' championship ====
| Pos. | Driver | SWE (Sweden) | MEX (Mexico) | JOR (Jordan) | NZL (New Zealand) | FIN (Finland) | GER (Germany) | JPN (Japan) | FRA (France) | GBR (United Kingdom) | Pts |
|---|---|---|---|---|---|---|---|---|---|---|---|
| 1 | (Portugal) Armindo Araújo | 3 | 1 | 2 | | | 1 | | 1 | 2 | 126 |
| 2 | (Sweden) Patrik Flodin | 1 | | 1 | | Ret | 3 | 1 | | 5 | 100 |
| 3 | (New Zealand) Hayden Paddon | | | | 1 | 3 | 2 | 2 | 7 | 3 | 97 |
| 4 | (Estonia) Ott Tänak | | | | | 1 | 5 | | 2 | 1 | 78 |
| 5 | (Japan) Toshi Arai | | 2 | | 4 | | 6 | Ret | 3 | 9 | 55 |
| 6 | (Italy) Gianluca Linari | 7 | 5 | | 5 | | | 3 | Ret | Ret | 41 |
| 7 | (Norway) Anders Grøndal | 2 | | | | 4 | | | 5 | 13 | 40 |
| 8 | (China) Rui Wang | | | 6 | Ret | 8 | | 5 | 6 | Ret | 30 |
| 9 | (San Marino) Alex Raschi | | | | | 5 | Ret | | 4 | 8 | 26 |
| 10 | (Lebanon) Nicholai Georgiou | | | 3 | Ret | 10 | 7 | | 9 | 11 | 24 |
| 11 | (Finland) Reijo Muhonen | 6 | | Ret | | 7 | Ret | 6 | | 10 | 23 |
| 12 | (Brazil) Paulo Nobre | 8 | | 7 | 6 | Ret | | Ret | | 14 | 18 |
| 13 | (New Zealand) Emma Gilmour | | | | 2 | | | | | | 18 |
| 14 | (Finland) Jukka Ketomäki | | | | | 2 | | | | | 18 |
| 15 | (Czech Republic) Martin Semerád | 5 | | Ret | | 6 | DNS | | | Ret | 18 |
| 16 | (New Zealand) Kingsley Thompson | | | | 3 | | | | | | 15 |
| 17 | (Italy) Fabio Frisiero | 4 | | | DNS | | | | Ret | | 12 |
| 18 | (Mexico) Benito Guerra | | 4 | | | | | | | | 12 |
| 19 | (Cyprus) Spyros Pavlides | | | 4 | | | | | | | 12 |
| 20 | (Germany) Hermann Gassner Jr. | | | | | | 4 | | | | 12 |
| 21 | (Japan) Kyosuke Kamata | | | | | | | 4 | | | 12 |
| 22 | (United Kingdom) Jason Pritchard | | | | | | | | | 4 | 12 |
| 23 | (Jordan) Amjad Farrah | | | 5 | | | | | | | 10 |
| 24 | (Mexico) Michel Jourdain Jr. | | | | Ret | 11 | Ret | Ret | 8 | 7 | 10 |
| 25 | (United Kingdom) Dave Weston Jr. | | | | | | | | Ret | 6 | 8 |
| 26 | (Kenya) Peter Horsey | | | | | 9 | 8 | | Ret | 12 | 6 |
| 27 | (Portugal) Nuno Barroso Pereira | | | | | Ret | 9 | | Ret | | 2 |
| 28 | (Argentina) Miguel Baldoni | | 3 | | Ret | | | | | | 0† |
| Pos. | Driver | SWE (Sweden) | MEX (Mexico) | JOR (Jordan) | NZL (New Zealand) | FIN (Finland) | GER (Germany) | JPN (Japan) | FRA (France) | GBR (United Kingdom) | Pts |

Key
| Colour | Result |
|---|---|
| Gold | Winner |
| Silver | 2nd place |
| Bronze | 3rd place |
| Green | Points finish |
| Blue | Non-points finish |
| Blue | Non-classified finish (NC) |
| Purple | Did not finish (Ret) |
| Black | Excluded (EX) |
| Black | Disqualified (DSQ) |
| White | Did not start (DNS) |
| White | Cancelled (C) |
| Blank | Withdrew entry from the event (WD) |

Notes

† Miguel Baldoni has been removed from the Classification.
