= Super 2000 World Rally Championship =

Defunct FIA rally world championship

- Category: Rallying
- Country: International
- Inaugural season: 2010
- Folded: 2012
- Classes: Super 2000; Group R4; Regional Rally Cars (RRC)
- Last Drivers' champion: (Republic of Ireland) Craig Breen
- Last Co-Drivers' champion: (Sweden) Emil Axelsson

The FIA Super 2000 World Rally Championship (also SWRC) was a support championship of the World Rally Championship (WRC) that ran for three seasons from 2010 to 2012.

It was introduced to provide a series for the Super 2000 (S2000) specification of rally car, which in performance terms sat above the Group N level production cars and its Production World Rally Championship (PWRC), and the World Rally Car that dominated overall WRC results. Between 2007 and 2009, Super 2000 cars were permitted in the PWRC alongside Group N, with a noticeable gap in performance between the two. The creation of SWRC returned PWRC to a production car only series. SWRC also provided an FIA alternative to the Intercontinental Rally Challenge, which had gained in popularity and may have been a commercial threat to the WRC.

SWRC was replaced by the then new WRC2 Championship in 2013, after the Super 2000 cars were replaced by the FIA with Group R cars, specifically the R5.

For one season only in 2010, there was also a WRC Cup for Teams which was only for Super 2000 cars. However, this cup was not part of the Super 2000 championship even though many of the crews driving for the teams were. This may be attributed to the way the cup and championship were approved by and proposed to the World Motor Sport Council separately. With the new World Rally Car being based on Super 2000 rules, there was no strictly Super 2000 based cup or championship for teams in the following years as this was incorporated into the World Rally Championship.

== Rules ==
=== Eligible rallies ===
In 2010, 10 of the rallies of the World Rally Championship calendar made up the calendar of the SWRC. Entrants needed to register and nominate at that point which seven rallies they would be contesting, which must have included two of the three rallies on the calendar outside Europe. Failure to contest any of the nominated rallies would have resulted in exclusion from the championship.

In 2011, the SWRC calendar consisted of eight WRC rallies, with entrants having to nominate seven to contest. There was no explicit rule requiring leaving Europe, but as two rounds were outside Europe, one or both would need to have been entered.

In 2012, the criteria was similar but there was only one round outside of Europe, Rally New Zealand.

Points and championship classifications were accumulated in a similar way to the World Rally Championship.

Section sources:

=== Eligible cars ===
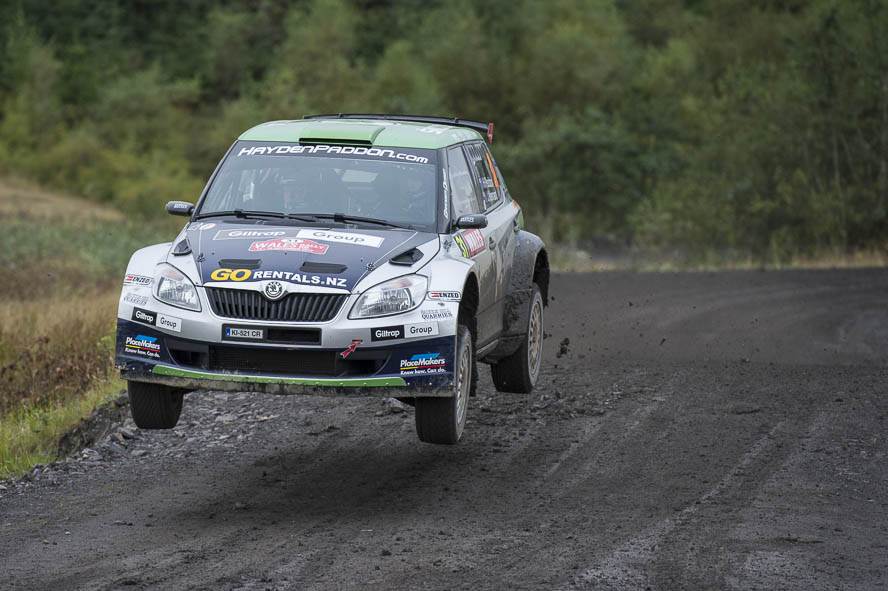
Haydon Paddon and John Kennard during Rally GB, contesting the 2012 SWRC in a Škoda Fabia S2000

The following Super 2000 rally cars were eligible to compete in SWRC 2010–2012:

- Fiat Grande Punto Abarth S2000
- Ford Fiesta S2000
- Peugeot 207 S2000
- Škoda Fabia S2000
- Mini John Cooper Works S2000
- Proton Satria Neo S2000

From 2011, the following R4 cars were also eligible:

- Mitsubishi Lancer Evolution IX
- Mitsubishi Lancer Evolution X
- Subaru Impreza WRX STI 3rd Gen
- Subaru WRX STI 4th Gen.

As derivatives of the Super 2000 car, the following Regional Rally Cars (RRC) were eligible to compete in 2012:

- Citroën DS3 RRC
- Ford Fiesta RS RRC

== Results and statistics ==
=== Winners and runners up ===
==== FIA Super 2000 World Rally Championship for Drivers ====
Year	Champion		2nd place		3rd place	
2010	(Spain) Xavier Pons	Ford Fiesta S2000	(Sweden) Patrik Sandell	Škoda Fabia S2000	(Czech Republic) Martin Prokop	Ford Fiesta S2000
2011	(Finland) Juho Hänninen	Škoda Fabia S2000	(Estonia) Ott Tänak	Ford Fiesta S2000	(Czech Republic) Martin Prokop	Ford Fiesta S2000
2012	(Republic of Ireland) Craig Breen	Ford Fiesta S2000	(Sweden) Per-Gunnar Andersson	Proton Satria Neo S2000	(Saudi Arabia) Yazeed Al-Rajhi	Ford Fiesta RRC

==== FIA Super 2000 World Rally Championship for Co-Drivers ====
Year	Champion		2nd place		3rd place	
2010	(Spain) Álex Haro	Ford Fiesta S2000	(Sweden) Emil Axelsson	Škoda Fabia S2000	(Czech Republic) Jan Tománek	Ford Fiesta S2000
2011	(Finland) Mikko Markkula	Škoda Fabia S2000	(Estonia) Kuldar Sikk	Ford Fiesta S2000	(Czech Republic) Jan Tománek	Ford Fiesta S2000
2012	(Sweden) Emil Axelsson	Proton Satria Neo S2000	(United Kingdom) Michael Orr	Ford Fiesta RRC	(New Zealand) John Kennard	Škoda Fabia S2000
