= 2010 Rally Catalunya =

Motor racing competition

2010 Rally Catalunya 46è Rally RACC Catalunya – Costa Daurada RACC Rally de España
Round 12 of the 2010 World Rally Championship season
← Previous event	Next event →
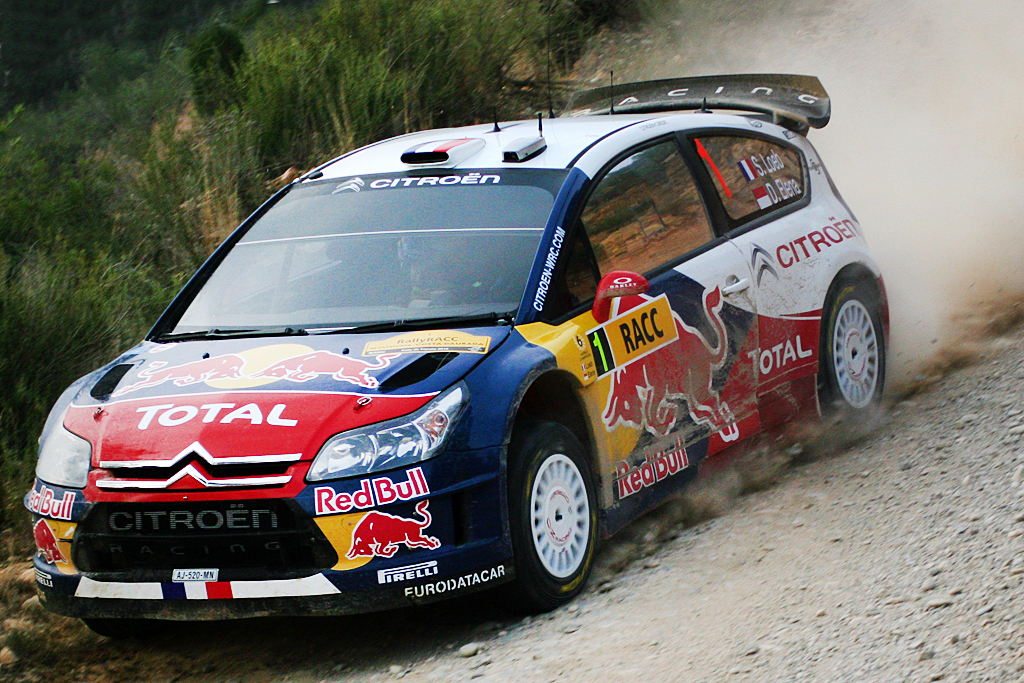
- Host country: Spain
- Rally base: Salou, Tarragona
- Dates run: 22 – 24 October 2010
- Stages: 16 (344.88 km; 214.30 miles)
- Stage surface: Asphalt with some gravel
- Overall distance: 1,301.70 km (808.84 miles)

Statistics
- Crews: 47 at start, 36 at finish

Overall results
- Overall winner: (France) Sébastien Loeb (France) Citroën World Rally Team

The 2010 Rally Catalunya was the twelfth and penultimate round of the 2010 World Rally Championship season. The rally took place over 22–24 October 2010, and was based in Salou, the second biggest city in the Province of Tarragona in Catalonia. The rally was also the sixth and final round of the Junior World Rally Championship.

After claiming the world championship at the previous round in France, Sébastien Loeb won the 61st WRC rally of his career by leading from start to finish. Second was Petter Solberg with Loeb's team-mate Dani Sordo completing an all-Citroën podium. Loeb's victory ensured that the marque's C4 would finish with a perfect record on asphalt, with it not being beaten on any WRC rally on the surface since its début in 2007.

Despite being forced to return under Superally conditions, Aaron Burkart won the JWRC championship title after Hans Weijs Jr. was slowed by a crankshaft sensor issue on the second run through El Priorat.

== Results ==
=== Event standings ===
Pos.	Driver	Co-driver	Car	Time	Difference	Points
Overall
1.	(France) Sébastien Loeb	(Monaco) Daniel Elena	Citroën C4 WRC	3:32:59.7	0.0	25
2.	(Norway) Petter Solberg	(United Kingdom) Chris Patterson	Citroën C4 WRC	3:33:35.0	35.3	18
3.	(Spain) Dani Sordo	(Spain) Diego Vallejo	Citroën C4 WRC	3:33:40.8	41.1	15
4.	(Finland) Jari-Matti Latvala	(Finland) Miikka Anttila	Ford Focus RS WRC 09	3:34:19.2	1:19.5	12
5.	(Finland) Mikko Hirvonen	(Finland) Jarmo Lehtinen	Ford Focus RS WRC 09	3:39:32.6	6:32.9	10
6.	(United Kingdom) Matthew Wilson	(United Kingdom) Scott Martin	Ford Focus RS WRC 08	3:41:17.3	8:17.6	8
7.	(United Arab Emirates) Khalid Al Qassimi	(United Kingdom) Michael Orr	Ford Focus RS WRC 08	3:46:05.4	13:05.7	6
8.	(Norway) Henning Solberg	(Belgium) Stéphane Prévot	Ford Fiesta S2000	3:46:10.9	13:11.2	4
9.	(United States) Ken Block	(Italy) Alex Gelsomino	Ford Focus RS WRC 08	3:49:00.9	16:01.2	2
10.	(France) Sébastien Ogier	(France) Julien Ingrassia	Citroën C4 WRC	3:50:23.8	17:24.1	1
JWRC
1. (12.)	(Spain) Yeray Lemes	(Spain) Rogelio Peňate	Renault Clio S1600	3:55:58.0	0.0	25
2. (14.)	(Bulgaria) Todor Slavov	(Bulgaria) Dobromir Filipov	Renault Clio R3	4:01:42.5	5:44.5	18
3. (18.)	(Netherlands) Hans Weijs Jr.	(Belgium) Bjorn Degandt	Citroën C2 S1600	4:06:48.5	10:50.5	15
4. (26.)	(Germany) Aaron Burkart	(Germany) André Kachel	Suzuki Swift S1600	4:24:43.1	28:45.1	12
5. (27.)	(United Kingdom) Harry Hunt	(United Kingdom) Sebastian Marshall	Ford Fiesta R2	4:24:52.4	28:54.4	10
6. (28.)	(Estonia) Martin Kangur	(Estonia) Martin Järveoja	Honda Civic type-r R3	4:26:03.1	30:05.1	8

=== Special stages ===
All dates and times are CEST (UTC+2).

Day	Stage	Time	Name	Length	Winner	Time	Avg. spd.	Rally leader
Leg 1 (22 Oct)	SS1	8:53	Terra Alta 1	35.94 km	(France) Sébastien Loeb	24:17.2	88.79 km/h	(France) Sébastien Loeb
Leg 1 (22 Oct)	SS2	9:51	La Ribera d'Ebre 1	14.97 km	(Norway) Petter Solberg	11:18.3	79.45 km/h	(France) Sébastien Loeb
Leg 1 (22 Oct)	SS3	10:34	Les Garrigues 1	12.07 km	(France) Sébastien Loeb	7:22.9	98.11 km/h	(France) Sébastien Loeb
Leg 1 (22 Oct)	SS4	14:47	Terra Alta 2	35.94 km	(France) Sébastien Ogier	23:42.4	90.96 km/h	(France) Sébastien Loeb
Leg 1 (22 Oct)	SS5	15:45	La Ribera d'Ebre 2	14.97 km	(Norway) Petter Solberg	11:08.3	80.64 km/h	(France) Sébastien Loeb
Leg 1 (22 Oct)	SS6	16:28	Les Garrigues 2	12.07 km	(France) Sébastien Loeb	7:25.8	97.47 km/h	(France) Sébastien Loeb
Leg 2 (23 Oct)	SS7	9:59	Santa Marina 1	26.51 km	(France) Sébastien Loeb	15:40.8	101.44 km/h	(France) Sébastien Loeb
Leg 2 (23 Oct)	SS8	11:17	La Mussara 1	20.48 km	(France) Sébastien Loeb	11:08.7	110.26 km/h	(France) Sébastien Loeb
Leg 2 (23 Oct)	SS9	12:07	Riudecanyes 1	16.32 km	(France) Sébastien Loeb	10:22.7	94.35 km/h	(France) Sébastien Loeb
Leg 2 (23 Oct)	SS10	14:11	Santa Marina 2	26.51 km	(Spain) Dani Sordo	15:45.3	100.96 km/h	(France) Sébastien Loeb
Leg 2 (23 Oct)	SS11	15:29	La Mussara 2	20.48 km	(France) Sébastien Loeb	11:09.7	110.09 km/h	(France) Sébastien Loeb
Leg 2 (23 Oct)	SS12	16:34	Riudecanyes 2	16.32 km	(Norway) Petter Solberg	10:22.5	94.38 km/h	(France) Sébastien Loeb
Leg 3 (24 Oct)	SS13	8:40	El Priorat 1	42.04 km	(Spain) Dani Sordo	23:46.4	106.10 km/h	(France) Sébastien Loeb
Leg 3 (24 Oct)	SS14	10:09	La Serra d'Almos 1	4.11 km	(Spain) Dani Sordo	2:34.7	95.64 km/h	(France) Sébastien Loeb
Leg 3 (24 Oct)	SS15	12:30	El Priorat 2	42.04 km	(Spain) Dani Sordo	23:40.6	106.54 km/h	(France) Sébastien Loeb
Leg 3 (24 Oct)	SS16	13:59	La Serra d'Almos 2	4.11 km	(Norway) Petter Solberg	2:35.2	95.34 km/h	(France) Sébastien Loeb

=== Standings after the rally ===
Drivers' Championship standings

Pos.	Driver	Points
1	(France) Sébastien Loeb	251
2	(France) Sebastien Ogier	167
3	(Finland) Jari-Matti Latvala	156
4	(Norway) Petter Solberg	151
5	(Spain) Dani Sordo	140
6	(Finland) Mikko Hirvonen	114
7	(United Kingdom) Matthew Wilson	68
8	(Norway) Henning Solberg	37
9	(Argentina) Federico Villagra	36
10	(Finland) Kimi Räikkönen	21

Manufacturers' Championship standings

Pos.	Manufacturer	Points
1	(France) Citroen WRT	428
2	(United Kingdom) BP Ford WRT	299
3	(France) Citroen Junior Team	194
4	(United Kingdom) Stobart Ford	158
5	(Argentina) Munchi's Ford	54
