= 2010 Rally New Zealand =

2010 Rally New Zealand 40th Rally New Zealand
Round 5 of the 2010 World Rally Championship
← Previous event	Next event →
- Host country: New Zealand
- Rally base: Auckland, New Zealand
- Dates run: 7 May – 9 2010
- Stages: 21 (396.50 km; 246.37 miles)
- Stage surface: Gravel with some asphalt
- Overall distance: 1,496.51 km (929.89 miles)

Statistics
- Crews: 54 at start, 38 at finish

Overall results
- Overall winner: (Finland) Jari-Matti Latvala (United Kingdom) BP Ford Abu Dhabi WRT

The 2010 Rally New Zealand was the fifth round of the 2010 World Rally Championship season. The rally took place over 7–9 May and is based in the country's largest city, Auckland. The rally was also the fourth round of both the Production World Rally Championship and the Super 2000 World Rally Championship.

Jari-Matti Latvala took his third WRC win after taking advantage of an error by Sébastien Ogier on the final stage; which promoted the Finn into first place. Latvala eventually took the victory by just 2.4 seconds with Sébastien Loeb a further 12.8 seconds back in third position. Loeb had been leading prior to stage 19, before hitting a tree which cost him over 40 seconds.

Jari Ketomaa won the Super 2000 class of the rally, finishing in eighth position overall. Xavier Pons also broke the top ten overall as he finished behind Ketomaa to extend his championship lead to 20 points over Martin Prokop, who finished third in the class. Home drivers dominated the PWRC class as Pirelli Star Driver Hayden Paddon, Emma Gilmour and Kingsley Thompson took a 1-2-3 for New Zealand drivers.

== Results ==
=== Event standings ===
Pos.	Driver	Co-driver	Car	Time	Difference	Points
1.	(Finland) Jari-Matti Latvala	(Finland) Miikka Anttila	Ford Focus RS WRC 09	4:04:09.8	0.0	25
2.	(France) Sébastien Ogier	(France) Julien Ingrassia	Citroën C4 WRC	4:04:12.2	2.4	18
3.	(France) Sébastien Loeb	(Monaco) Daniel Elena	Citroën C4 WRC	4:04:25.0	15.2	15
4.	(Finland) Mikko Hirvonen	(Finland) Jarmo Lehtinen	Ford Focus RS WRC 09	4:04:31.1	21.3	12
5.	(Spain) Dani Sordo	(Spain) Marc Martí	Citroën C4 WRC	4:04:35.6	25.8	10
6.	(United Kingdom) Matthew Wilson	(United Kingdom) Scott Martin	Ford Focus RS WRC 08	4:07:35.8	3:26.0	8
7.	(Norway) Henning Solberg	(Austria) Ilka Minor	Ford Focus RS WRC 08	4:10:25.1	6:15.3	6
8.	(Finland) Jari Ketomaa	(Finland) Mika Stenberg	Ford Fiesta S2000	4:14:29.1	10:19.3	4
9.	(Argentina) Federico Villagra	(Argentina) Jorge Pérez Companc	Ford Focus RS WRC 08	4:14:59.6	10:49.8	2
10.	(Spain) Xavier Pons	(Spain) Alex Haro	Ford Fiesta S2000	4:15:23.2	11:13.4	1
SWRC
1. (8.)	(Finland) Jari Ketomaa	(Finland) Mika Stenberg	Ford Fiesta S2000	4:14:29.1	0.0	25
2. (10.)	(Spain) Xavier Pons	(Spain) Alex Haro	Ford Fiesta S2000	4:15:23.2	54.1	18
3. (11.)	(Czech Republic) Martin Prokop	(Czech Republic) Jan Tománek	Ford Fiesta S2000	4:15:43.1	1:14.0	15
4. (12.)	(Sweden) Patrik Sandell	(Sweden) Emil Axelsson	Škoda Fabia S2000	4:16:08.5	1:39.4	12
5. (13.)	(Qatar) Nasser Al-Attiyah	(Italy) Giovanni Bernacchini	Škoda Fabia S2000	4:16:43.9	2:14.8	10
PWRC
1. (14.)	(New Zealand) Hayden Paddon	(New Zealand) John Kennard	Mitsubishi Lancer Evo IX	4:19:28.8	0.0	25
2. (17.)	(New Zealand) Emma Gilmour	(Australia) Glenn MacNeall	Subaru Impreza WRX STi	4:22:44.2	3:15.4	18
3. (20.)	(New Zealand) Kingsley Thompson	(New Zealand) Malcolm Peden	Mitsubishi Lancer Evo X	4:28:38.8	9:10.0	15
4. (26.)	(Japan) Toshi Arai	(United Kingdom) Daniel Barritt	Subaru Impreza WRX STi	4:37:39.3	18:10.5	12
5. (27.)	(Italy) Gianluca Linari	(Italy) Paolo Gregoriani	Subaru Impreza WRX STi	4:38:54.1	19:25.3	10
6. (35.)	(Brazil) Paulo Nobre	(Brazil) Edu Paula	Mitsubishi Lancer Evo X	5:07:02.3	47:33.5	8

=== Special stages ===
All dates and times are NZST (UTC+12).

Day	Stage	Time	Name	Length	Winner	Time	Avg. spd.	Rally leader
1 (7 May)	SS1	09:03	Waipu Gorge	11.09 km	(Norway) Petter Solberg	6:34.8	101.12 km/h	(Norway) Petter Solberg
1 (7 May)	SS2	09:26	Brooks 1	13.60 km	(France) Sébastien Ogier	8:13.7	99.17 km/h	(Norway) Petter Solberg
1 (7 May)	SS3	10:19	Bull 1	32.56 km	(Spain) Dani Sordo	20:50.9	93.71 km/h	(Spain) Dani Sordo
1 (7 May)	SS4	11:02	Cassidy 1	22.20 km	(Spain) Dani Sordo	12:47.5	104.13 km/h	(Spain) Dani Sordo
1 (7 May)	SS5	13:38	Springfield	9.87 km	(France) Sébastien Ogier	5:36.5	105.59 km/h	(France) Sébastien Ogier
1 (7 May)	SS6	14:11	Brooks 2	13.60 km	(France) Sébastien Ogier	7:56.5	102.75 km/h	(France) Sébastien Ogier
1 (7 May)	SS7	14:59	Bull 2	32.56 km	(France) Sébastien Loeb	20:01.1	97.59 km/h	(Finland) Jari-Matti Latvala
1 (7 May)	SS8	15:42	Cassidy 2	22.20 km	(Norway) Petter Solberg	12:15.2	108.71 km/h	(Norway) Petter Solberg
1 (7 May)	SS9	18:45	SSS Auckland Domain	1.50 km	(France) Sébastien Loeb (France) Sébastien Ogier	1:06.4	81.33 km/h	(Norway) Petter Solberg
2 (8 May)	SS10	07:43	New Franklin 1	20.82 km	(France) Sébastien Loeb	11:39.9	107.09 km/h	(France) Sébastien Ogier
2 (8 May)	SS11	08:33	Baker 1	21.42 km	(France) Sébastien Loeb	12:45.6	100.72 km/h	(France) Sébastien Ogier
2 (8 May)	SS12	09:11	Te Akau Coast 1	30.89 km	(France) Sébastien Loeb	18:08.3	102.18 km/h	(France) Sébastien Ogier
2 (8 May)	SS13	11:46	SSS Hampton Downs 1	4.68 km	(France) Sébastien Ogier	2:38.3	106.43 km/h	(France) Sébastien Ogier
2 (8 May)	SS14	12:49	New Franklin 2	20.82 km	(France) Sébastien Loeb	11:14.5	111.12 km/h	(France) Sébastien Ogier
2 (8 May)	SS15	13:39	Baker 2	21.42 km	(France) Sébastien Loeb	12:05.1	106.35 km/h	(France) Sébastien Ogier
2 (8 May)	SS16	14:17	Te Akau Coast 2	30.89 km	(France) Sébastien Loeb	17:26.2	106.29 km/h	(France) Sébastien Ogier
2 (8 May)	SS17	15:59	SSS Hampton Downs 2	4.68 km	(France) Sébastien Ogier	2:36.3	107.79 km/h	(France) Sébastien Ogier
3 (9 May)	SS18	08:38	Te Hutewai 1	11.13 km	(Finland) Mikko Hirvonen	7:53.5	84.62 km/h	(France) Sébastien Loeb
3 (9 May)	SS19	09:11	Whaanga Coast 1	29.67 km	(Norway) Petter Solberg	21:27.9	82.94 km/h	(France) Sébastien Ogier
3 (9 May)	SS20	10:51	Te Hutewai 2	11.13 km	(France) Sébastien Loeb	7:30.9	88.86 km/h	(France) Sébastien Ogier
3 (9 May)	SS21	11:24	Whaanga Coast 2	29.67 km	(Spain) Dani Sordo	20:49.3	85.50 km/h	(Finland) Jari-Matti Latvala

=== Standings after the rally ===
Drivers' Championship standings

Pos.	Driver	Points
1	(France) Sébastien Loeb	108
2	(Finland) Jari-Matti Latvala	72
3	(Finland) Mikko Hirvonen	64
4	(France) Sebastien Ogier	63
5	(Norway) Petter Solberg	53
6	(Spain) Dani Sordo	34
7	(United Kingdom) Matthew Wilson	30
8	(Norway) Henning Solberg	24
9	(Argentina) Federico Villagra	22
10	(Finland) Kimi Räikkönen	14

Manufacturers' Championship standings

Pos.	Manufacturer	Points
1	(France) Citroen WRT	156
2	(United Kingdom) BP Ford WRT	151
3	(France) Citroen Junior Team	75
4	(United Kingdom) Stobart Ford	74
5	(Argentina) Munchi's Ford	32
