= 2010 Rally of Turkey =

Round 4 of the 2010 World Rally Championship
← Previous event	Next event →
- Host country: Turkey
- Rally base: Istanbul, Turkey
- Dates run: April 16 – 18 2010
- Stages: 23 (358.84 km; 222.97 miles)
- Stage surface: Gravel with some asphalt
- Overall distance: 1,104.15 km (686.09 miles)

Statistics
- Crews: 40 at start, 32 at finish

Overall results
- Overall winner: (France) Sébastien Loeb (France) Citroën Total World Rally Team

The 2010 Rally of Turkey was the fourth round of the 2010 World Rally Championship season. The rally took place over April 16–18, and was based in the country's largest city, Istanbul. The rally was also the opening round of the Junior World Rally Championship.

The event was won by Sébastien Loeb, his third successive victory of the season and the 57th of his career.

== Results ==
=== Event standings ===
Pos.	Driver	Co-driver	Car	Time	Difference	Points
Overall
1.	(France) Sébastien Loeb	(Monaco) Daniel Elena	Citroën C4 WRC	3:01:38.7	0.0	25
2.	(Norway) Petter Solberg	(United Kingdom) Phil Mills	Citroën C4 WRC 2009	3:02:33.2	54.5	18
3.	(Finland) Mikko Hirvonen	(Finland) Jarmo Lehtinen	Ford Focus RS WRC 09	3:03:22.1	1:43.4	15
4.	(France) Sébastien Ogier	(France) Julien Ingrassia	Citroën C4 WRC	3:05:24.7	3:46.0	12
5.	(Finland) Kimi Räikkönen	(Finland) Kaj Lindström	Citroën C4 WRC	3:08:23.0	6:44.3	10
6.	(Argentina) Federico Villagra	(Argentina) José Díaz	Ford Focus RS WRC 08	3:09:35.4	7:56.7	8
7.	(United Kingdom) Matthew Wilson	(United Kingdom) Scott Martin	Ford Focus RS WRC 08	3:10:08.5	8:29.8	6
8.	(Finland) Jari-Matti Latvala	(Finland) Miikka Anttila	Ford Focus RS WRC 09	3:21:22.9	19:44.2	4
9.	(Netherlands) Dennis Kuipers	(Belgium) Frederic Miclotte	Ford Fiesta S2000	3:25:00.9	23:22.2	2
10.	(Germany) Aaron Burkart	(Germany) Andre Kachel	Suzuki Swift S1600	3:28:43.4	27:04.7	1
JWRC
1. (10.)	(Germany) Aaron Burkart	(Germany) Andre Kachel	Suzuki Swift S1600	3:28:43.4	0.0	25
2. (11.)	(San Marino) Alessandro Broccoli	(Italy) Angela Forina	Renault Clio R3	3:32:37.1	3:53.7	18
3. (15.)	(Netherlands) Kevin Abbring	(Belgium) Erwin Mombaerts	Renault Clio R3	3:38:27.1	9:43.7	15
4. (16.)	(Bulgaria) Todor Slavov	(Bulgaria) Dobromir Filipov	Renault Clio R3	3:43:38.3	14:54.9	12
5. (18.)	(United Kingdom) Harry Hunt	(United Kingdom) Sebastian Marshall	Ford Fiesta R2	3:47:24.3	18:40.9	10
6. (31.)	(Estonia) Karl Kruuda	(Estonia) Martin Jarveoja	Suzuki Swift S1600	4:25:43.5	57:00.1	8

=== Special stages ===
All dates and times are EEST (UTC+3).

Day	Stage	Time	Name	Length	Winner	Time	Avg. spd.	Rally leader
1 (16 Apr)	SS1	09:03	Darlık 1	15.66 km	(Norway) Petter Solberg	9:30.4	98.84 km/h	(Norway) Petter Solberg
1 (16 Apr)	SS2	09:46	Karabeyli 1	8.23 km	(Finland) Mikko Hirvonen	4:43.1	104.66 km/h	(Finland) Mikko Hirvonen
1 (16 Apr)	SS3	10:14	Bozgoca 1	13.52 km	(France) Sébastien Ogier	8:11.2	99.09 km/h	(France) Sébastien Ogier
1 (16 Apr)	SS4	10:57	Halli 1	9.60 km	(Norway) Petter Solberg	4:45.0	121.26 km/h	(France) Sébastien Ogier
1 (16 Apr)	SS5	14:00	Darlık 2	15.66 km	(France) Sébastien Ogier	9:11.1	102.30 km/h	(France) Sébastien Ogier
1 (16 Apr)	SS6	14:43	Karabeyli 2	8.23 km	(France) Sébastien Ogier	4:34.6	107.90 km/h	(France) Sébastien Ogier
1 (16 Apr)	SS7	15:11	Bozgoca 2	13.52 km	(Spain) Dani Sordo	7:59.0	101.61 km/h	(France) Sébastien Ogier
1 (16 Apr)	SS8	15:54	Halli 2	9.60 km	(Norway) Petter Solberg	4:33.8	126.22 km/h	(France) Sébastien Ogier
1 (16 Apr)	SS9	19:57	SSS Istanbul	2.20 km	(France) Sébastien Loeb	1:55.9	68.33 km/h	(France) Sébastien Ogier
2 (17 Apr)	SS10	09:56	Göçbeyli 1	18.17 km	(Norway) Petter Solberg	10:34.4	103.11 km/h	(France) Sébastien Ogier
2 (17 Apr)	SS11	10:34	Ulupelit 1	12.98 km	(Finland) Mikko Hirvonen	7:11.1	108.39 km/h	(France) Sébastien Ogier
2 (17 Apr)	SS12	11:27	Bozhane 1	14.59 km	(France) Sébastien Ogier	8:46.7	99.72 km/h	(France) Sébastien Ogier
2 (17 Apr)	SS13	12:00	Riva 1	27.17 km	(Norway) Petter Solberg	15:29.2	105.26 km/h	(France) Sébastien Ogier
2 (17 Apr)	SS14	15:06	Göçbeyli 2	18.17 km	(France) Sébastien Loeb	10:24.8	104.69 km/h	(France) Sébastien Ogier
2 (17 Apr)	SS15	15:44	Ulupelit 2	12.98 km	(Finland) Mikko Hirvonen	6:58.8	111.58 km/h	(France) Sébastien Loeb
2 (17 Apr)	SS16	16:37	Bozhane 2	14.59 km	(France) Sébastien Loeb	8:43.4	100.35 km/h	(France) Sébastien Loeb
2 (17 Apr)	SS17	17:10	Riva 2	27.17 km	(France) Sébastien Loeb	15:01.4	108.51 km/h	(France) Sébastien Loeb
3 (18 Apr)	SS18	09:13	Deniz 1	16.76 km	stage cancelled			(France) Sébastien Loeb
3 (18 Apr)	SS19	09:51	Mudarli 1	21.32 km	stage cancelled			(France) Sébastien Loeb
3 (18 Apr)	SS20	10:39	Ballica 1	19.22 km	(France) Sébastien Loeb	10:00.5	115.22 km/h	(France) Sébastien Loeb
3 (18 Apr)	SS21	13:12	Deniz 2	16.76 km	(France) Sébastien Loeb	9:48.8	102.47 km/h	(France) Sébastien Loeb
3 (18 Apr)	SS22	13:50	Mudarli 2	21.32 km	(France) Sébastien Loeb	12:35.0	101.66 km/h	(France) Sébastien Loeb
3 (18 Apr)	SS23	14:38	Ballica 2	19.22 km	(France) Sébastien Ogier	9:51.0	117.08 km/h	(France) Sébastien Loeb

=== Standings after the rally ===
Drivers' Championship standings

Pos.	Driver	Points
1	(France) Sébastien Loeb	93
2	(Norway) Petter Solberg	53
3	(Finland) Mikko Hirvonen	52
4	(Finland) Jari-Matti Latvala	47
5	(France) Sebastien Ogier	45
6	(Spain) Dani Sordo	24
7	(United Kingdom) Matthew Wilson	22
8	(Argentina) Federico Villagra	20
9	(Norway) Henning Solberg	18
10	(Finland) Kimi Räikkönen	14

Manufacturers' Championship standings

Pos.	Manufacturer	Points
1	(France) Citroen WRT	126
2	(United Kingdom) BP Ford WRT	111
3	(France) Citroen Junior Team	75
4	(United Kingdom) Stobart Ford	56
5	(Argentina) Munchi's Ford	26
