= 2010 Jordan Rally =

2010 Jordan Rally 28th Jordan Rally
Round 3 of the 2010 World Rally Championship
← Previous event	Next event →
- Host country: Jordan
- Rally base: Dead Sea Centre, Jordan
- Dates run: April 1 – 3 2010
- Stages: 21 (339.48 km; 210.94 miles)
- Stage surface: Gravel
- Overall distance: 911.78 km (566.55 miles)

Statistics
- Crews: 33 at start, 27 at finish

Overall results
- Overall winner: (France) Sébastien Loeb (France) Citroën Total World Rally Team

The 2010 Jordan Rally was the third round of the 2010 World Rally Championship season. The rally took place over April 1–3, and was based beside the Dead Sea, 50 kilometres (31 mi) from Jordan's capital, Amman. The rally was also the third round of both the Production Car World Rally Championship, and the Super 2000 World Rally Championship. Sébastien Loeb won the 56th WRC rally of his career, taking the lead midway through the second leg, and holding on to win by 35.8 seconds ahead of Jari-Matti Latvala, who had been the pacesetter on the first day. Petter Solberg finished third, taking his second successive podium after his first in Mexico.

Much of the talk on the rally was down to controversial team orders in relation to road position. Citroën Junior Team's Sébastien Ogier left the final morning's service five minutes late, getting a time penalty that dropped him behind Ford's Latvala. Ford used Mikko Hirvonen – who had retired on the first day, and was returning under SupeRally conditions – as their hand, to leave service early so he jumped up the running order. Citroën countered by making Ogier check into the time control at SS14 eight minutes early, to road sweep ahead of Loeb. Citroën later stated that Ogier's late departure was due to an electrical problem. Ogier's teammate Kimi Räikkönen finished eighth and became the second driver after Carlos Reutemann to score drivers' championship points in both Formula One and the World Rally Championship.

In the SWRC, Xavier Pons won his second consecutive event, and again managed to break into the top ten placings in the overall standings. His margin of victory over Eyvind Brynildsen was nearly twelve minutes, as he moved into a ten-point lead in the SWRC standings. Sweden victor Per-Gunnar Andersson finished third ahead of Nasser Al-Attiyah, Patrik Sandell and Jari Ketomaa.

In the PWRC, Patrik Flodin took his second victory in two starts, beating Armindo Araújo by close to two minutes. Araújo's second place was enough to maintain his lead in the championship standings, but Flodin now trails by just eight points. Nicholai Georgiou finished third.

== Results ==
=== Event standings ===
Pos.	Driver	Co-driver	Car	Time	Difference	Points
Overall
1.	(France) Sébastien Loeb	(Monaco) Daniel Elena	Citroën C4 WRC	3:51:35.9	0.0	25
2.	(Finland) Jari-Matti Latvala	(Finland) Miikka Anttila	Ford Focus RS WRC 09	3:52:11.7	35.8	18
3.	(Norway) Petter Solberg	(United Kingdom) Phil Mills	Citroën C4 WRC	3:52:47.7	1:11.8	15
4.	(Spain) Dani Sordo	(Spain) Marc Martí	Citroën C4 WRC	3:53:25.2	1:49.3	12
5.	(United Kingdom) Matthew Wilson	(United Kingdom) Scott Martin	Ford Focus RS WRC 08	4:00:00.2	8:24.3	10
6.	(France) Sébastien Ogier	(France) Julien Ingrassia	Citroën C4 WRC	4:02:02.3	10:26.4	8
7.	(Argentina) Federico Villagra	(Argentina) Jorge Pérez Companc	Ford Focus RS WRC 08	4:03:03.9	11:28.0	6
8.	(Finland) Kimi Räikkönen	(Finland) Kaj Lindstrom	Citroën C4 WRC	4:04:06.9	12:31.0	4
9.	(Norway) Henning Solberg	(Austria) Ilka Minor	Ford Focus RS WRC 08	4:05:44.5	14:08.6	2
10.	(Spain) Xavier Pons	(Spain) Alex Haro	Ford Fiesta S2000	4:10:09.8	18:33.9	1
SWRC
1. (10.)	(Spain) Xavier Pons	(Spain) Alex Haro	Ford Fiesta S2000	4:10:09.8	0.0	25
2. (14.)	(Norway) Eyvind Brynildsen	(Norway) Cato Menkerud	Škoda Fabia S2000	4:22:01.8	11:52.0	18
3. (16.)	(Sweden) Per-Gunnar Andersson	(Sweden) Jonas Andersson	Škoda Fabia S2000	4:29:07.2	18:57.4	15
4. (18.)	(Qatar) Nasser Al-Attiyah	(Italy) Giovanni Bernacchini	Škoda Fabia S2000	4:31:26.0	21:16.2	12
5. (23.)	(Sweden) Patrik Sandell	(Sweden) Emil Axelsson	Škoda Fabia S2000	4:51:50.0	41:40.2	10
6. (25.)	(Finland) Jari Ketomaa	(Finland) Mika Stenberg	Ford Fiesta S2000	5:04:29.3	54:19.5	8
PWRC
1. (11.)	(Sweden) Patrik Flodin	(Sweden) Göran Bergsten	Subaru Impreza WRX STi	4:10:42.9	0.0	25
2. (12.)	(Portugal) Armindo Araújo	(Portugal) Miguel Ramalho	Mitsubishi Lancer Evo X	4:12:39.5	1:56.6	18
3. (15.)	(Lebanon) Nicholai Georgiou	(Lebanon) Joseph Matar	Mitsubishi Lancer Evo IX	4:29:01.3	18:18.4	15
4. (17.)	(Cyprus) Spyros Pavlides	(United Kingdom) Chris Patterson	Subaru Impreza WRX STi	4:29:54.8	19:11.9	12
5. (19.)	(Jordan) Amjad Farrah	(Jordan) Nancy Al-Majali	Subaru Impreza WRX STi	4:33:00.4	22:17.5	10
6. (21.)	(China) Wang Rui	(China) Pan Hongyu	Subaru Impreza WRX STi	4:38:14.8	27:31.9	8
7. (24.)	(Brazil) Paulo Nobre	(Brazil) Edu Paula	Mitsubishi Lancer Evo X	4:55:12.0	44:29.1	6

=== Special stages ===
All dates and times are EEST (UTC+3).

Day	Stage	Time	Name	Length	Winner	Time	Avg. spd.	Rally leader
1 (1 Apr)	SS1	11:28	Rumman Forest	15.34 km	(Finland) Jari-Matti Latvala	12:12.1	75.43 km/h	(Finland) Jari-Matti Latvala
1 (1 Apr)	SS2	12:26	Wadi Shueib 1	8.65 km	(Finland) Jari-Matti Latvala	7:05.2	73.24 km/h	(Finland) Jari-Matti Latvala
1 (1 Apr)	SS3	12:54	Mahes 1	20.44 km	(Spain) Dani Sordo	14:44.1	83.23 km/h	(Spain) Dani Sordo
1 (1 Apr)	SS4	13:37	Mount Nebo 1	11.09 km	(Norway) Petter Solberg	8:16.3	80.44 km/h	(Finland) Jari-Matti Latvala
1 (1 Apr)	SS5	15:50	Wadi Shueib 2	8.65 km	(Finland) Jari-Matti Latvala	6:44.1	77.06 km/h	(Finland) Jari-Matti Latvala
1 (1 Apr)	SS6	16:13	Mahes 2	20.44 km	(Norway) Petter Solberg	14:17.7	85.79 km/h	(Finland) Jari-Matti Latvala
1 (1 Apr)	SS7	16:56	Mount Nebo 2	11.09 km	(France) Sébastien Loeb	8:00.6	83.07 km/h	(Finland) Jari-Matti Latvala
2 (2 Apr)	SS8	08:11	Suwayma 1	10.49 km	(France) Sébastien Loeb	5:13.7	120.38 km/h	(Finland) Jari-Matti Latvala
2 (2 Apr)	SS9	08:51	Kafrain 1	17.20 km	(Norway) Petter Solberg	11:54.0	86.72 km/h	(Finland) Jari-Matti Latvala
2 (2 Apr)	SS10	09:49	Jordan River 1	41.45 km	(France) Sébastien Loeb	27:38.4	89.98 km/h	(Finland) Jari-Matti Latvala
2 (2 Apr)	SS11	12:50	Suwayma 2	10.49 km	(France) Sébastien Loeb	5:13.7	120.38 km/h	(France) Sébastien Loeb (Finland) Jari-Matti Latvala
2 (2 Apr)	SS12	13:30	Kafrain 2	17.20 km	(Norway) Petter Solberg	11:43.3	88.04 km/h	(France) Sébastien Loeb
2 (2 Apr)	SS13	14:28	Jordan River 2	41.45 km	(France) Sébastien Loeb	27:10.0	91.55 km/h	(France) Sébastien Loeb
3 (3 Apr)	SS14	08:20	Yakrut 1	14.16 km	(France) Sébastien Loeb	8:30.4	99.87 km/h	(France) Sébastien Loeb
3 (3 Apr)	SS15	08:50	Bahath 1	12.53 km	(Norway) Petter Solberg	9:30.3	79.10 km/h	(France) Sébastien Loeb
3 (3 Apr)	SS16	09:33	Shuna 1	15.23 km	(France) Sébastien Loeb	11:55.5	76.63 km/h	(France) Sébastien Loeb
3 (3 Apr)	SS17	10:16	Baptism Site 1	10.83 km	(France) Sébastien Loeb	5:21.1	121.42 km/h	(France) Sébastien Loeb
3 (3 Apr)	SS18	12:11	Yakrut 2	14.16 km	(Finland) Jari-Matti Latvala	8:21.1	101.73 km/h	(France) Sébastien Loeb
3 (3 Apr)	SS19	12:41	Bahath 2	12.53 km	(France) Sébastien Loeb	9:17.0	80.98 km/h	(France) Sébastien Loeb
3 (3 Apr)	SS20	13:24	Shuna 2	15.23 km	(Finland) Jari-Matti Latvala	12:00.6	76.09 km/h	(France) Sébastien Loeb
3 (3 Apr)	SS21	14:07	Baptism Site 2	10.83 km	(France) Sébastien Ogier	5:25.8	119.67 km/h	(France) Sébastien Loeb

=== Standings after the rally ===
Drivers' Championship standings

Pos.	Driver	Points
1	(France) Sébastien Loeb	68
2	(Finland) Jari-Matti Latvala	43
3	(Finland) Mikko Hirvonen	37
4	(Norway) Petter Solberg	35
5	(France) Sebastien Ogier	33
6	(Spain) Dani Sordo	24
7	(Norway) Henning Solberg	18
8	(United Kingdom) Matthew Wilson	16
9	(Argentina) Federico Villagra	12
10	(Spain) Xavier Pons	5

Manufacturers' Championship standings

Pos.	Manufacturer	Points
1	(France) Citroen WRT	101
2	(United Kingdom) BP Ford WRT	87
3	(France) Citroen Junior Team	48
4	(United Kingdom) Stobart Ford	44
5	(Argentina) Munchi's Ford	16
