= 2010 Rally Japan =

Rally Championship

Round 10 of the 2010 World Rally Championship season
← Previous event	Next event →
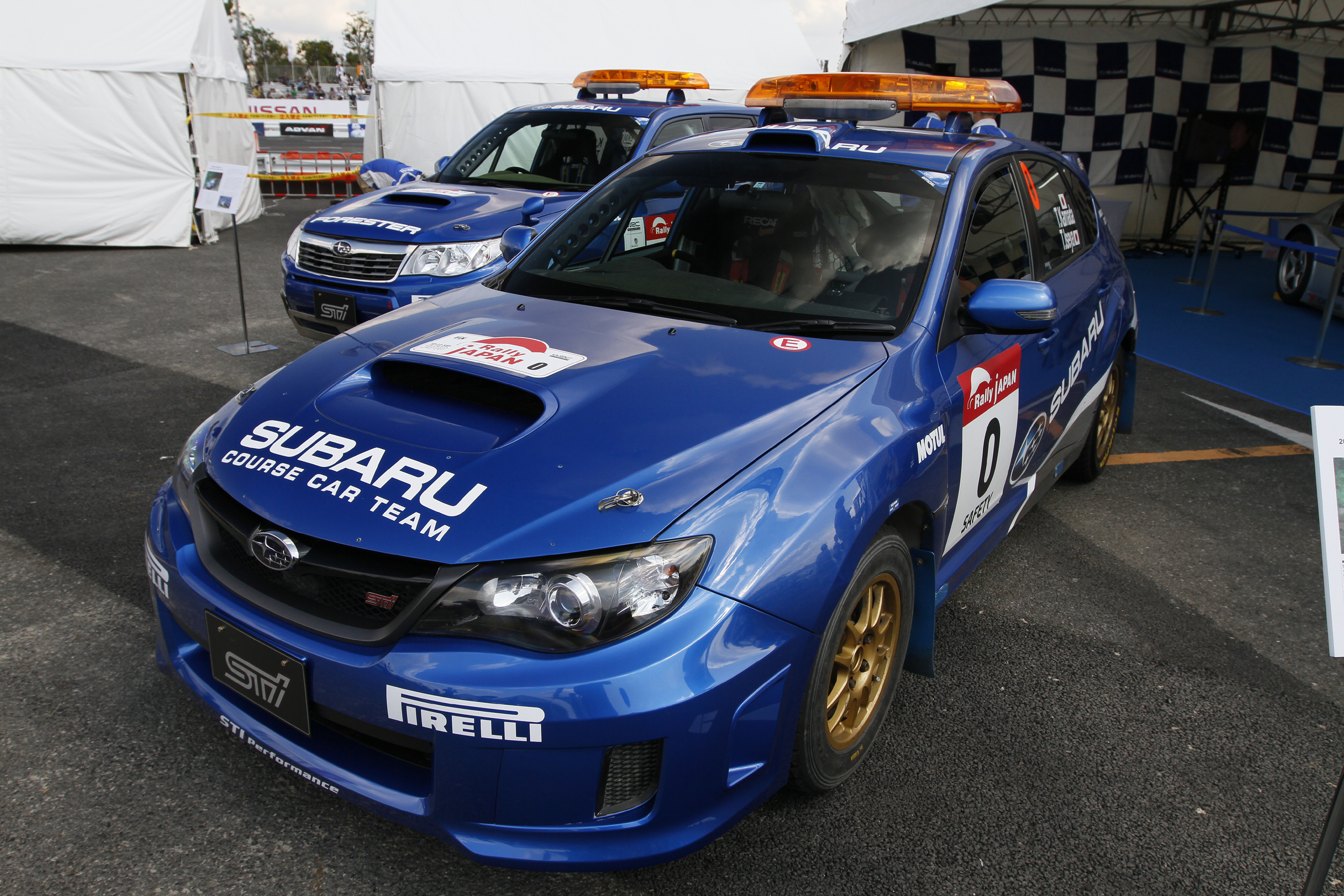
- Host country: Japan
- Rally base: Sapporo, Hokkaidō
- Dates run: 9 – 12 September 2010
- Stages: 26 (301.12 km; 187.11 miles)
- Stage surface: Gravel
- Overall distance: 1,205.07 km (748.80 miles)

Statistics
- Crews: 70 at start, 54 at finish

Overall results
- Overall winner: (France) Sébastien Ogier (France) Citroën World Rally Team

The 2010 Rally Japan, was the 10th round of the 2010 World Rally Championship (WRC) season. The 26 stage gravel rally took place on 9 – 12 September 2010 and was based in the city of Sapporo. The rally featured eight super specials at the Sapporo Dome with the rally finishing at the Dome on the Sunday afternoon.

Sébastien Ogier took the second WRC victory of his career, capitalising on a broken damper for Petter Solberg which dropped him out of the lead on the final morning of the rally. Ogier also cut into teammate Sébastien Loeb's championship lead, reducing it to 43 points before their home event in France.

== Introduction ==
Prior to the rally, depending on results, Sébastien Loeb could have clinched his seventh consecutive world title with three events to spare. With a 58-point lead over teammate Sébastien Ogier pre-rally, Loeb had to outscore Ogier by 18 points in order to secure the championship, as well as beating Ford's Jari-Matti Latvala by 2 points, as the Finnish driver was 74 points behind Loeb. Petter Solberg and Dani Sordo were still in mathematical contention but would have to finish in the top two placings in Japan, with Loeb failing to score, to stay in contention.

== Results ==
=== Event standings ===
Pos.	Driver	Co-driver	Car	Time	Difference	Points
Overall
1.	(France) Sébastien Ogier	(France) Julien Ingrassia	Citroën C4 WRC	3:10:26.4	0.0	25
2.	(Norway) Petter Solberg	(United Kingdom) Chris Patterson	Citroën C4 WRC	3:10:42.1	15.7	18
3.	(Finland) Jari-Matti Latvala	(Finland) Miikka Anttila	Ford Focus RS WRC 09	3:10:52.4	26.0	15
4.	(Spain) Dani Sordo	(Spain) Diego Vallejo	Citroën C4 WRC	3:11:01.6	35.2	12
5.	(France) Sébastien Loeb	(Monaco) Daniel Elena	Citroën C4 WRC	3:11:19.7	53.3	10
6.	(Finland) Mikko Hirvonen	(Finland) Jarmo Lehtinen	Ford Focus RS WRC 09	3:11:39.9	1:13.5	8
7.	(Norway) Henning Solberg	(Austria) Ilka Minor	Ford Focus RS WRC 08	3:13:29.5	3:03.1	6
8.	(Argentina) Federico Villagra	(Argentina) Jorge Pérez Companc	Ford Focus RS WRC 08	3:20:44.3	10:17.9	4
9.	(Finland) Jari Ketomaa	(Finland) Mika Stenberg	Ford Fiesta S2000	3:25:13.5	14:47.1	2
10.	(Czech Republic) Martin Prokop	(Czech Republic) Jan Tománek	Ford Fiesta S2000	3:25:47.2	15:20.8	1
SWRC
1. (9.)	(Finland) Jari Ketomaa	(Finland) Mika Stenberg	Ford Fiesta S2000	3:25:13.5	0.0	25
2. (10.)	(Czech Republic) Martin Prokop	(Czech Republic) Jan Tománek	Ford Fiesta S2000	3:25:47.2	33.7	18
PWRC
1. (11.)	(Sweden) Patrik Flodin	(Sweden) Göran Bergsten	Subaru Impreza WRX STI	3:31:08.3	0.0	25
2. (12.)	(New Zealand) Hayden Paddon	(New Zealand) John Kennard	Mitsubishi Lancer Evo X	3:33:54.1	2:45.8	18
3. (16.)	(Italy) Gianluca Linari	(Italy) Paolo Gregoriani	Subaru Impreza WRX STI	3:46:15.1	15:06.8	15
4. (17.)	(Japan) Kyosuke Kamata	(Japan) Takumi Takahashi	Mitsubishi Lancer Evo IX	3:48:18.6	17:10.3	12
5. (20.)	(China) Wang Rui	(China) Pan Hongyu	Subaru Impreza WRX STI	3:53:07.8	21:59.5	10
6. (46.)	(Finland) Reijo Muhonen	(Finland) Lasse Miettinen	Mitsubishi Lancer Evo X	4:39:53.3	1:08:45.0	8

=== Special stages ===
All dates and times are JST (UTC+9).

Day	Stage	Time	Name	Length	Winner	Time	Avg. spd.	Rally leader
Leg 1 (9–10 Sept)	SS1	18:40	SSS Sapporo 1	1.57 km	(France) Sébastien Ogier	1:21.8	69.10 km/h	(France) Sébastien Ogier
Leg 1 (9–10 Sept)	SS2	18:52	SSS Sapporo 2	1.57 km	(France) Sébastien Ogier	1:21.4	69.43 km/h	(France) Sébastien Ogier
Leg 1 (9–10 Sept)	SS3	10:23	Iwanke 1	26.92 km	(Norway) Petter Solberg	16:21.2	98.77 km/h	(France) Sébastien Ogier
Leg 1 (9–10 Sept)	SS4	11:27	Sikot 1	27.76 km	(Norway) Petter Solberg	15:49.9	105.21 km/h	(Norway) Petter Solberg
Leg 1 (9–10 Sept)	SS5	12:15	Koyka 1	3.55 km	(Norway) Henning Solberg	1:55.1	111.03 km/h	(Norway) Petter Solberg
Leg 1 (9–10 Sept)	SS6	15:03	Iwanke 2	26.92 km	(Finland) Jari-Matti Latvala	16:08.0	100.12 km/h	(Norway) Petter Solberg
Leg 1 (9–10 Sept)	SS7	16:07	Sikot 2	27.76 km	(Finland) Mikko Hirvonen	15:35.0	106.88 km/h	(Norway) Petter Solberg
Leg 1 (9–10 Sept)	SS8	16:55	Koyka 2	3.55 km	(Finland) Mikko Hirvonen	1:55.9	110.27 km/h	(Norway) Petter Solberg
Leg 1 (9–10 Sept)	SS9	18:34	SSS Sapporo 3	1.57 km	(France) Sébastien Loeb	1:24.5	66.89 km/h	(Norway) Petter Solberg
Leg 1 (9–10 Sept)	SS10	18:46	SSS Sapporo 4	1.57 km	(Norway) Petter Solberg	1:24.0	67.29 km/h	(Norway) Petter Solberg
Leg 2 (11 Sept)	SS11	10:28	Nikara 1	17.68 km	(Norway) Petter Solberg	9:38.8	109.97 km/h	(Norway) Petter Solberg
Leg 2 (11 Sept)	SS12	11:26	Kamuycep 1	33.76 km	(Finland) Jari-Matti Latvala	21:02.3	96.28 km/h	(Norway) Petter Solberg
Leg 2 (11 Sept)	SS13	12:22	Kina 1	9.55 km	(Spain) Dani Sordo	5:34.5	102.78 km/h	(Finland) Jari-Matti Latvala
Leg 2 (11 Sept)	SS14	15:09	Nikara 2	17.68 km	(Norway) Petter Solberg	9:30.0	111.66 km/h	(Finland) Jari-Matti Latvala
Leg 2 (11 Sept)	SS15	16:07	Kamuycep 2	33.76 km	(Spain) Dani Sordo	20:31.5	98.69 km/h	(Finland) Jari-Matti Latvala
Leg 2 (11 Sept)	SS16	17:03	Kina 2	9.55 km	(Norway) Petter Solberg	5:32.6	103.37 km/h	(Norway) Petter Solberg
Leg 2 (11 Sept)	SS17	18:33	SSS Sapporo 5	1.57 km	(Norway) Petter Solberg	1:24.8	66.65 km/h	(Norway) Petter Solberg
Leg 2 (11 Sept)	SS18	18:45	SSS Sapporo 6	1.57 km	(Finland) Mikko Hirvonen	1:24.1	67.21 km/h	(Norway) Petter Solberg
Leg 3 (12 Sept)	SS19	7:31	Bisan 1	4.71 km	(France) Sébastien Loeb	2:27.7	114.80 km/h	(Norway) Petter Solberg
Leg 3 (12 Sept)	SS20	8:13	Naekawa 1	17.86 km	(France) Sébastien Ogier	14:21.6	74.62 km/h	(France) Sébastien Ogier
Leg 3 (12 Sept)	SS21	9:37	Sunagawa 1	3.70 km	(France) Sébastien Loeb	2:39.7	83.41 km/h	(France) Sébastien Ogier
Leg 3 (12 Sept)	SS22	10:12	Bisan 2	4.71 km	(France) Sébastien Ogier	2:26.4	115.82 km/h	(France) Sébastien Ogier
Leg 3 (12 Sept)	SS23	10:54	Naekawa 2	17.86 km	(Finland) Jari-Matti Latvala	14:05.6	76.04 km/h	(France) Sébastien Ogier
Leg 3 (12 Sept)	SS24	11:58	Sunagawa 2	3.70 km	(France) Sébastien Loeb	2:36.3	85.22 km/h	(France) Sébastien Ogier
Leg 3 (12 Sept)	SS25	14:00	SSS Sapporo 7	1.57 km	(France) Sébastien Ogier	1:24.0	67.29 km/h	(France) Sébastien Ogier
Leg 3 (12 Sept)	SS26	14:12	SSS Sapporo 8	1.57 km	(Finland) Jari-Matti Latvala	1:23.8	67.45 km/h	(France) Sébastien Ogier

=== Standings after the rally ===
Drivers' Championship standings

Pos.	Driver	Points
1	(France) Sébastien Loeb	201
2	(France) Sebastien Ogier	158
3	(Finland) Jari-Matti Latvala	132
4	(Norway) Petter Solberg	118
5	(Spain) Dani Sordo	107
6	(Finland) Mikko Hirvonen	94
7	(United Kingdom) Matthew Wilson	56
8	(Norway) Henning Solberg	31
9	(Argentina) Federico Villagra	30
10	(Finland) Kimi Räikkönen	21

Manufacturers' Championship standings

Pos.	Manufacturer	Points
1	(France) Citroen WRT	345
2	(United Kingdom) BP Ford WRT	250
3	(France) Citroen Junior Team	183
4	(United Kingdom) Stobart Ford	130
5	(Argentina) Munchi's Ford	46
