= 2013 WRC2 Championship =

Season of a car rallying competition

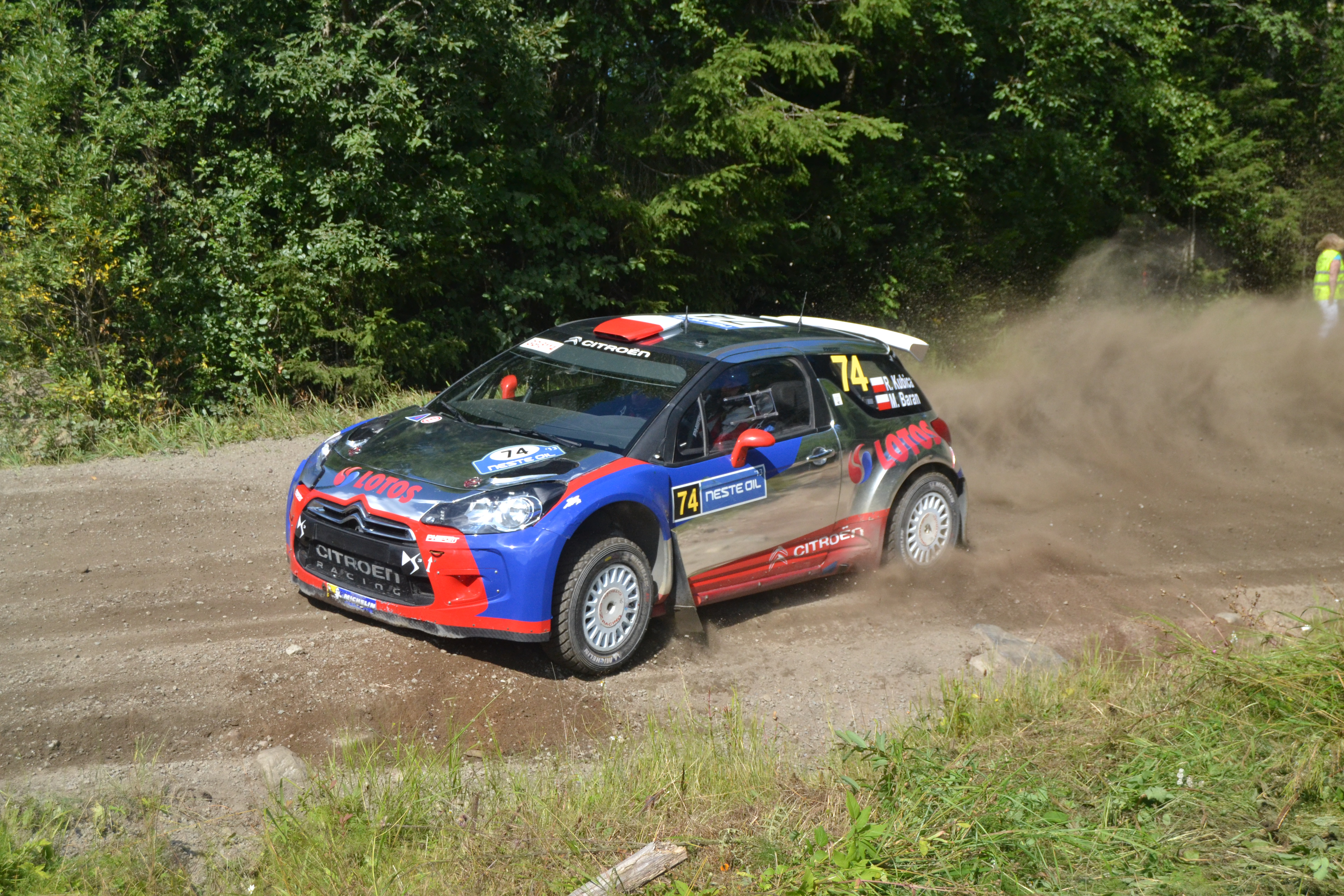
Former Formula One driver Robert Kubica—seen here at the Rally of Finland—won the WRC-2 title, driving a Citroën DS3 RRC.

The 2013 FIA WRC2 Championship was the first season of WRC2, a rallying championship organised and governed by the Fédération Internationale de l'Automobile in support of the World Rally Championship. It was created when the Group R class of rally car was introduced in 2013.

Unlike its predecessor, the Super 2000 World Rally Championship, WRC2 does not have a calendar of mandatory events. Instead, teams and drivers competing in the series are free to contest any of thirteen rallies that form the 2013 World Rally Championship. They must nominate up to seven events to score points in, and their best six results from these seven events will count towards their final championship points score. The championship was open to cars complying with R4, R5, Super 2000 and Group N regulations.

At the penultimate round of the season in Spain, Robert Kubica won the championship title by 25 points from Seashore Qatar Rally Team's Abdulaziz Al-Kuwari. Yuriy Protasov finished third in the championship. In the teams' championship, Seashore Qatar Rally Team won the championship with a lead of 47 points over Yazeed Racing. Peruvian Nicolás Fuchs has amassed enough points to win the Production Car Cup, having finished as best privateer at six of the seven events he has completed.

== Teams and drivers ==
The following teams and drivers competed in the 2013 WRC2 season:

Team	Car	Tyre	No.	Driver	Co-driver	Class	Rounds
(Czech Republic) Škoda Motorsport	Škoda Fabia S2000	M	31	(Finland) Esapekka Lappi	(Finland) Janne Ferm	S	1, 4
(Germany) Škoda Auto Deutschland	Škoda Fabia S2000	M	32	(Germany) Sepp Wiegand	(Germany) Frank Christian	S	1–2, 4, 7, 9, 12–13
(Austria) Stohl Racing	Subaru Impreza WRX STi	M	33	(Germany) Armin Kremer	(Germany) Klaus Wicha	N	1, 3, 5, 7
(Austria) Stohl Racing	Ford Fiesta RRC	M	33	(Germany) Armin Kremer	(Germany) Klaus Wicha	S	9
(Belgium) Symtech Racing	Ford Fiesta R5	D	34	(United Kingdom) Mark Higgins	(United Kingdom) Carl Williamson	R5	13
(Belgium) Symtech Racing	Peugeot 207 S2000	M	34	(Italy) Luca Betti	(Italy) Francesco Pezzoli	S	1
(Belgium) Symtech Racing	Subaru Impreza STi R4	M	34	(Ukraine) Yuriy Protasov	(Estonia) Kuldar Sikk	R4	2–3, 5
(Belgium) Symtech Racing	Subaru Impreza STi R4	M	39	(Ukraine) Yuriy Protasov	(Estonia) Kuldar Sikk	R4	1
(Saudi Arabia) Yazeed Racing	Ford Fiesta RRC	M	35	(Saudi Arabia) Yazeed Al Rajhi	(United Kingdom) Michael Orr	S	2, 8, 10, 12–13
(United Arab Emirates) Skydive Dubai Rally Team	Škoda Fabia S2000	D	36	(United Arab Emirates) Rashid Al Ketbi	(Germany) Karina Hepperle	S	1–2, 4, 6
(United Arab Emirates) Skydive Dubai Rally Team	Subaru Impreza WRX STi	D	36	(United Arab Emirates) Rashid Al Ketbi	(Germany) Karina Hepperle	N	7
(United Arab Emirates) Skydive Dubai Rally Team	Ford Fiesta R5	D	36	(United Arab Emirates) Rashid Al Ketbi	(Germany) Karina Hepperle	R5	9, 11–12
(Italy) Fuckmatiè World Rally Team	Subaru Impreza WRX STi	M	37	(Italy) Lorenzo Bertelli	(Italy) Lorenzo Granai	N	1, 3, 5
(Italy) Fuckmatiè World Rally Team	Ford Fiesta RRC	M	37	(Italy) Lorenzo Bertelli	(Italy) Mitia Dotta	S	6–7
(Italy) Fuckmatiè World Rally Team	Ford Fiesta R5	M	37	(Italy) Lorenzo Bertelli	(Italy) Mitia Dotta	R5	12–13
(Mexico) Moto Club Igualda	Mitsubishi Lancer Evo X	M	38	(Mexico) Ricardo Triviño	(Spain) Alex Haro	N	1–3
(Mexico) Moto Club Igualda	Mitsubishi Lancer Evo IX	D	38	(Mexico) Ricardo Triviño	(Spain) Alex Haro	N	5–6
(Mexico) Moto Club Igualda	Subaru Impreza WRX STi	D	38	(Mexico) Ricardo Triviño	(Spain) Alex Haro	N	9, 11
(Finland) Tommi Mäkinen Racing	Subaru Impreza WRX STi	M	40	(Kazakhstan) Arman Smailov	(Russia) Andrei Rusov	N	2, 4, 6–8, 10
(Spain) RMC Motorsport	Mitsubishi Lancer Evo IX	D	41	(Peru) Nicolàs Fuchs	(Argentina) Fernando Mussano	N	3, 5
(Spain) RMC Motorsport	Mitsubishi Lancer Evo X	D	41	(Peru) Nicolàs Fuchs	(Argentina) Fernando Mussano	N	2, 4, 6–7, 12
(Spain) RMC Motorsport	Mitsubishi Lancer Evo X	D	72	(Argentina) Juan Carlos Alonso	(Argentina) Juan Pablo Manasterolo	N	4–8, 12
(Norway) Anders Grøndal Rally Team	Subaru Impreza WRX STi	M	42	(Norway) Anders Grøndal	(Norway) Trond Svendsen	N	2
(Czech Republic) Semerád	Mitsubishi Lancer Evo IX	D	43	(Czech Republic) Martin Hudec	(Czech Republic) Jakub Kotál	N	2, 8, 11
(Czech Republic) Semerád	Ford Fiesta R5	D	43	(United Kingdom) Tom Cave	(United Kingdom) Ieuan Thomas	R5	13
(Spain) Calm Competició	Mitsubishi Lancer Evo X	M	45	(Spain) Alexander Villanueva	(Spain) Óscar Sánchez	N	2, 4, 6
(Spain) Calm Competició	Mitsubishi Lancer Evo X	D	45	(Spain) Alexander Villanueva	(Spain) Óscar Sánchez	N	8, 13
(Italy) Vomero Racing	Mitsubishi Lancer Evo X	D	46	(Italy) Marco Vallario	(Italy) Antonio Pascale	N	2, 6–7, 9, 11–12
(Italy) Vomero Racing	Mitsubishi Lancer Evo X	D	46	(Italy) Marco Vallario	(Italy) Manuela Di Lorenzo	N	4
(United Kingdom) DMACK-Autotek	Ford Fiesta RRC	D	47	(Norway) Eyvind Brynildsen	(Sweden) Anders Fredriksson	S	2
(United Kingdom) DMACK-Autotek	Ford Fiesta R5	D	47	(Norway) Eyvind Brynildsen	(Sweden) Maria Andersson	R5	8–9
(United Kingdom) DMACK-Autotek	Ford Fiesta R5	D	47	(Norway) Eyvind Brynildsen	(France) Denis Giraudet	R5	13
(United Kingdom) DMACK-Autotek	Ford Fiesta R5	D	88	(Finland) Jari Ketomaa	(Finland) Marko Sallinen	R5	8
(United Kingdom) DMACK-Autotek	Ford Fiesta R5	D	88	(Finland) Jari Ketomaa	(Finland) Tapio Suominen	R5	13
Seashore Qatar Rally Team	Ford Fiesta RRC	M	48	(Qatar) Abdulaziz Al-Kuwari	(Republic of Ireland) Killian Duffy	S	3–7, 10, 13
(Ukraine) Mentos Ascania Racing	Mini John Cooper Works S2000	M	49	(Ukraine) Oleksiy Kikireshko	(Estonia) Sergei Larens	S	4, 6–7
(Ukraine) Mentos Ascania Racing	Mini John Cooper Works S2000	M	49	(Ukraine) Oleksiy Kikireshko	(Ukraine) Andrii Nikolaiev	S	8, 11, 13
(Ukraine) Mentos Ascania Racing	Mini John Cooper Works S2000	M	50	(Ukraine) Valeriy Gorban	(Ukraine) Volodymir Korsia	S	4, 6–8, 11, 13
(Lebanon) Motortune Racing	Ford Fiesta RRC	M	71	(Jordan) Ala'a Rasheed	(Lebanon) Joseph Matar	S	4
(Lebanon) Motortune Racing	Ford Fiesta RRC	D	71	(Jordan) Ala'a Rasheed	(Lebanon) Joseph Matar	S	6–7
(Lebanon) Motortune Racing	Ford Fiesta R5	D	71	(Jordan) Ala'a Rasheed	(Lebanon) Joseph Matar	R5	11–12
(Switzerland) Škoda Swiss Motorsport	Škoda Fabia S2000	M	73	(Russia) Nikita Kondrakhin	(Italy) Danilo Fappani	S	4
(France) PH Sport	Citroën DS3 RRC	M	74	(Poland) Robert Kubica	(Poland) Maciek Baran	S	4, 6–9, 11–12
(United Kingdom) Qatar M-Sport World Rally Team	Ford Fiesta RRC	M	75	(United Kingdom) Elfyn Evans	(United Kingdom) Daniel Barritt	S	4
(United Kingdom) Qatar M-Sport World Rally Team	Ford Fiesta R5	M	75	(United Kingdom) Elfyn Evans	(United Kingdom) Daniel Barritt	R5	8–9, 11–13
(Indonesia) Bosowa Rally Team	Ford Fiesta RRC	M	76	(Indonesia) Subhan Aksa	(Italy) Nicola Arena	S	4, 6
(Indonesia) Bosowa Rally Team	Ford Fiesta R5	M	76	(Indonesia) Subhan Aksa	(Italy) Nicola Arena	R5	9–10, 12–13
(Italy) Top Run SRL	Subaru Impreza WRX STi	M	77	(Argentina) Marcos Ligato	(Argentina) Rubén García	N	4–5
(Italy) E2 Tre Colli World Rally Team	Ford Fiesta RRC	M	78	(Italy) Edoardo Bresolin	(Italy) Rudy Pollet	S	4, 8, 13
(United Kingdom) CA1 Sport Ltd	Ford Fiesta S2000	D	79	(Republic of Ireland) Robert Barrable	(United Kingdom) Stuart Loudon	S	4
(United Kingdom) CA1 Sport Ltd	Ford Fiesta R5	D	79	(Republic of Ireland) Robert Barrable	(United Kingdom) Stuart Loudon	R5	8–9
(United Kingdom) CA1 Sport Ltd	Ford Fiesta R5	M	79	(Republic of Ireland) Robert Barrable	(United Kingdom) Stuart Loudon	R5	11–13
(Estonia) MM Motorsport	Ford Fiesta RRC	M	82	(Ukraine) Yuriy Protasov	(Estonia) Kuldar Sikk	S	6–7
(Estonia) MM Motorsport	Ford Fiesta R5	M	82	(Ukraine) Yuriy Protasov	(Estonia) Kuldar Sikk	R5	10
(Estonia) MM Motorsport	Ford Fiesta R5	M	82	(Estonia) Karl Kruuda	(Estonia) Martin Järveoja	R5	8–9
(Ukraine) AT Rally Team	Ford Fiesta RRC	M	83	(Ukraine) Oleksiy Tamrazov	(Ukraine) Pavlo Cherepin	S	6
(Austria) BRR Team	Škoda Fabia S2000	M	84	(New Zealand) Hayden Paddon	(New Zealand) John Kennard	S	8–10
(Austria) BRR Team	Škoda Fabia S2000	M	90	(Finland) Esapekka Lappi	(Finland) Janne Ferm	S	8
(Finland) Hannu's Rally Team	Subaru Impreza STi R4	M	85	(Finland) Juha Salo	(Finland) Marko Salminen	R4	8
(Finland) Hannu's Rally Team	Subaru Impreza STi R4	M	89	(Finland) Mikko Lehessaari	(Finland) Lassi Hartikainen	R4	8
Ralliart Italy; Motorsport Italia	Mitsubishi Lancer Evo X	D	86	(Venezuela) Carlos Garcia Fessman	(Argentina) Marcelo Der Ohannesian	N	8
Ralliart Italy; Motorsport Italia	Mitsubishi Lancer Evo X	D	86	(Venezuela) Carlos Garcia Fessman	(Portugal) Hugo Magalhães	N	9–13
Ralliart Italy; Motorsport Italia	Mitsubishi Lancer Evo X	D	87	(Venezuela) Jose Alexander Gelvez	(Mexico) Gabriel Marín Jr	N	8
Ralliart Italy; Motorsport Italia	Mitsubishi Lancer Evo X	D	87	(Venezuela) Jose Alexander Gelvez	(Spain) Borja Rozada	N	11
Ralliart Italy; Motorsport Italia	Mini John Cooper Works S2000	D	87	(Venezuela) Jose Alexander Gelvez	(Spain) Borja Rozada	S	10
Ralliart Italy; Motorsport Italia	Mini John Cooper Works S2000	D	87	(Venezuela) Jose Alexander Gelvez	(Ecuador) Luis Adolfo Espinosa	S	13
Ralliart Italy; Motorsport Italia	Mitsubishi Lancer Evo X	D	91	(Venezuela) Alejandro Lombardo	(Spain) Alex Haro	N	10, 13
Ralliart Italy; Motorsport Italia	Mitsubishi Lancer Evo X	D	91	(Venezuela) Alejandro Lombardo	(Ecuador) Luis Adolfo Espinosa	N	11–12

Icon	Class
R4	Classification within Group R
R5	Classification within Group R
S	Super 2000
N	Group N

=== Driver changes ===
- Rashid al Ketbi will move from the Intercontinental Rally Challenge to the WRC-2 championship, competing with a Škoda Fabia S2000.
- Elfyn Evans will join the WRC-2 championship as part of his prize for winning the 2012 WRC Academy championship, driving a Ford Fiesta RRC prepared by M-Sport at selected events in 2013.
- Esapekka Lappi, who contested selected events of the Super 2000 World Rally Championship in 2011 and 2012 will contest the WRC-2 championship with Škoda Motorsport, driving a Škoda Fabia S2000.
- Valeriy Gorban and Oleksiy Kikireshko will switch from competing with the Mitsubishi Lancer Evolution IX to racing a Super 2000 version of the Mini John Cooper Works WRC under the Mentos Ascania Racing banner.
- Former Formula One driver Robert Kubica will contest seven rounds of the championship, driving a Citroën DS3 RRC alongside a European Rally Championship campaign.
- Sepp Wiegand will move into the WRC-2 full-time, after competing in the 2011 and 2012 Rallye Deutschland with a Škoda Fabia S2000 prepared by Volkswagen Motorsport.
- Former WRC driver Matthew Wilson will return to competition in the WRC-2 after spending most of the 2012 season recovering from an injury.

== Rally summaries ==
Round	Rally name	Podium finishers						Statistics		
Round	Rally name	Pos.	No.	Driver	Team	Time	Stages	Length	Starters	Finishers
1	(Monaco) Monte Carlo Rally (15–20 January) — Results and report	1	32	(Germany) Sepp Wiegand (Germany) Frank Christian	(Germany) Škoda Auto Deutschland (Škoda Fabia S2000)	5:48:31.7	(18)^{†} 16	(478.42 km)^{†} 436.02 km	8	5
1	(Monaco) Monte Carlo Rally (15–20 January) — Results and report	2	33	(Germany) Armin Kremer (Germany) Klaus Wicha	(Austria) Stohl Racing (Subaru Impreza WRX STi)	5:56:57.5	(18)^{†} 16	(478.42 km)^{†} 436.02 km	8	5
1	(Monaco) Monte Carlo Rally (15–20 January) — Results and report	3	39	(Ukraine) Yuriy Protasov (Estonia) Kuldar Sikk	(Belgium) Symtech Racing (Subaru Impreza STi R4)	5:59:53.0	(18)^{†} 16	(478.42 km)^{†} 436.02 km	8	5
2	Rally Sweden (8–10 February) — Results and report	1	35	(Saudi Arabia) Yazeed Al Rajhi (United Kingdom) Michael Orr	(Saudi Arabia) Yazeed Racing (Ford Fiesta RRC)	3:28:08.9	22	297.78 km	12	11
2	Rally Sweden (8–10 February) — Results and report	2	42	(Norway) Anders Grøndal (Norway) Trond Svendsen	(Norway) Anders Grøndal Rally Team (Subaru Impreza WRX STi)	3:28:52.4	22	297.78 km	12	11
2	Rally Sweden (8–10 February) — Results and report	3	32	(Germany) Sepp Wiegand (Germany) Frank Christian	(Germany) Škoda Auto Deutschland (Škoda Fabia S2000)	3:32:14.0	22	297.78 km	12	11
3	Rally Mexico (8–10 March) — Results and report	1	48	(Qatar) Abdulaziz Al-Kuwari (Republic of Ireland) Killian Duffy	Seashore Qatar Rally Team (Ford Fiesta RRC)	5:01:10.3	23	396.82 km	6	5
3	Rally Mexico (8–10 March) — Results and report	2	41	(Peru) Nicolàs Fuchs (Argentina) Fernando Mussano	(Spain) RMC Motorsport (Mitsubishi Lancer Evo IX)	5:10:24.9	23	396.82 km	6	5
3	Rally Mexico (8–10 March) — Results and report	3	38	(Mexico) Ricardo Triviño (Spain) Alex Haro	(Mexico) Moto Club Igualda (Mitsubishi Lancer Evo X)	5:18:44.5	23	396.82 km	6	5
4	Rally de Portugal (12–14 April) — Results and report	1	31	(Finland) Esapekka Lappi (Finland) Janne Ferm	(Czech Republic) Škoda Motorsport (Škoda Fabia S2000)	4:23:59.7	15	386.73 km	19	14
4	Rally de Portugal (12–14 April) — Results and report	2	79	(Republic of Ireland) Robert Barrable (United Kingdom) Stuart Loudon	(United Kingdom) CA1 Sport Ltd (Ford Fiesta S2000)	4:35:36.2	15	386.73 km	19	14
4	Rally de Portugal (12–14 April) — Results and report	3	32	(Germany) Sepp Wiegand (Germany) Frank Christian	(Germany) Škoda Auto Deutschland (Škoda Fabia S2000)	4:39:02.8	15	386.73 km	19	14
5	Rally Argentina (3–5 May) — Results and report	1	48	(Qatar) Abdulaziz Al-Kuwari (Republic of Ireland) Killian Duffy	Seashore Qatar Rally Team (Ford Fiesta RRC)	5:08:27.1	14	407.64 km	8	6
5	Rally Argentina (3–5 May) — Results and report	2	41	(Peru) Nicolàs Fuchs (Argentina) Fernando Mussano	(Spain) RMC Motorsport (Mitsubishi Lancer Evo IX)	5:21:34.0	14	407.64 km	8	6
5	Rally Argentina (3–5 May) — Results and report	3	77	(Argentina) Marcos Ligato (Argentina) Rubén García	(Italy) Top Run SRL (Subaru Impreza WRX STI)	5:31:39.0	14	407.64 km	8	6
6	(Greece) Acropolis Rally (31 May–2 June) — Results and report	1	74	(Poland) Robert Kubica (Poland) Maciek Baran	(France) PH Sport (Citroën DS3 RRC)	3:46:20.3	14	306.53 km	17	13
6	(Greece) Acropolis Rally (31 May–2 June) — Results and report	2	82	(Ukraine) Yuriy Protasov (Estonia) Kuldar Sikk	(Estonia) MM Motorsport (Ford Fiesta RRC)	3:47:50.1	14	306.53 km	17	13
6	(Greece) Acropolis Rally (31 May–2 June) — Results and report	3	48	(Qatar) Abdulaziz Al-Kuwari (Republic of Ireland) Killian Duffy	Seashore Qatar Rally Team (Ford Fiesta RRC)	3:48:33.6	14	306.53 km	17	13
7	(Italy) Rally Italia Sardegna (21–23 June) — Results and report	1	74	(Poland) Robert Kubica (Poland) Maciek Baran	(France) PH Sport (Citroën DS3 RRC)	3:39:45.5	16	304.50 km	13	8
7	(Italy) Rally Italia Sardegna (21–23 June) — Results and report	2	48	(Qatar) Abdulaziz Al-Kuwari (Republic of Ireland) Killian Duffy	Seashore Qatar Rally Team (Ford Fiesta RRC)	3:44:02.5	16	304.50 km	13	8
7	(Italy) Rally Italia Sardegna (21–23 June) — Results and report	3	37	(Italy) Lorenzo Bertelli (Italy) Mitia Dotta	(Italy) Fuckmatiè World Rally Team (Ford Fiesta RRC)	3:46:04.0	16	304.50 km	13	8
8	Rally Finland (1–3 August) — Results and report	1	88	(Finland) Jari Ketomaa (Finland) Marko Sallinen	(United Kingdom) DMACK-Autotek (Ford Fiesta R5)	2:54:29.6	23	324.21 km	20	14
8	Rally Finland (1–3 August) — Results and report	2	74	(Poland) Robert Kubica (Poland) Maciek Baran	(France) PH Sport (Citroën DS3 RRC)	2:55:58.5	23	324.21 km	20	14
8	Rally Finland (1–3 August) — Results and report	3	84	(New Zealand) Hayden Paddon (New Zealand) John Kennard	(Austria) BRR Team (Škoda Fabia S2000)	2:57:23.5	23	324.21 km	20	14
9	(Germany) Rallye Deutschland (23–25 August) — Results and report	1	74	(Poland) Robert Kubica (Poland) Maciek Baran	(France) PH Sport (Citroën DS3 RRC)	3:24:20.7	(16)^{†} 15	(371.86 km)^{†} 330.78 km	13	9
9	(Germany) Rallye Deutschland (23–25 August) — Results and report	2	75	(United Kingdom) Elfyn Evans (United Kingdom) Daniel Barritt	(United Kingdom) Qatar M-Sport World Rally Team (Ford Fiesta R5)	3:24:33.6	(16)^{†} 15	(371.86 km)^{†} 330.78 km	13	9
9	(Germany) Rallye Deutschland (23–25 August) — Results and report	3	84	(New Zealand) Hayden Paddon (New Zealand) John Kennard	(Austria) BRR Team (Škoda Fabia S2000)	3:28:20.6	(16)^{†} 15	(371.86 km)^{†} 330.78 km	13	9
10	Rally Australia (13–15 September) — Results and report	1	48	(Qatar) Abdulaziz Al-Kuwari (Republic of Ireland) Killian Duffy	Seashore Qatar Rally Team (Ford Fiesta RRC)	3:37:22.7	22	352.36 km	8	7
10	Rally Australia (13–15 September) — Results and report	2	82	(Ukraine) Yuriy Protasov (Estonia) Kuldar Sikk	(Estonia) MM Motorsport (Ford Fiesta R5)	3:38:36.1	22	352.36 km	8	7
10	Rally Australia (13–15 September) — Results and report	3	35	(Saudi Arabia) Yazeed Al Rajhi (United Kingdom) Michael Orr	(Saudi Arabia) Yazeed Racing (Ford Fiesta RRC)	3:44:23.7	22	352.36 km	8	7
11	Rallye de France Alsace (4–7 October) — Results and report	1	74	(Poland) Robert Kubica (Poland) Maciek Baran	(France) PH Sport (Citroën DS3 RRC)	3:02:39.0	20	312.14 km	11	8
11	Rallye de France Alsace (4–7 October) — Results and report	2	75	(United Kingdom) Elfyn Evans (United Kingdom) Daniel Barritt	(United Kingdom) Qatar M-Sport World Rally Team (Ford Fiesta R5)	3:06:42.9	20	312.14 km	11	8
11	Rallye de France Alsace (4–7 October) — Results and report	3	36	(United Arab Emirates) Rashid al Ketbi (Germany) Karina Hepperle	(United Arab Emirates) Skydive Dubai Rally Team (Ford Fiesta R5)	3:21:49.6	20	312.14 km	11	8
12	(Spain) Rally Catalunya (25–27 October) — Results and report	1	74	(Poland) Robert Kubica (Poland) Maciek Baran	(France) PH Sport (Citroën DS3 RRC)	3:44:35.3	15	355.92 km	12	8
12	(Spain) Rally Catalunya (25–27 October) — Results and report	2	35	(Saudi Arabia) Yazeed Al Rajhi (United Kingdom) Michael Orr	(Saudi Arabia) Yazeed Racing (Ford Fiesta RRC)	3:49:51.1	15	355.92 km	12	8
12	(Spain) Rally Catalunya (25–27 October) — Results and report	3	79	(Republic of Ireland) Robert Barrable (United Kingdom) Stuart Loudon	(United Kingdom) CA1 Sport Ltd (Ford Fiesta R5)	4:00:06.4	15	355.92 km	12	8
13	(United Kingdom) Wales Rally GB (15–17 November) — Results and report	1	75	(United Kingdom) Elfyn Evans (United Kingdom) Daniel Barritt	(United Kingdom) Qatar M-Sport World Rally Team (Ford Fiesta R5)	3:15:09.8	22	311.15 km	12	11
13	(United Kingdom) Wales Rally GB (15–17 November) — Results and report	2	88	(Finland) Jari Ketomaa (Finland) Tapio Suominen	(United Kingdom) DMACK-Autotek (Ford Fiesta R5)	3:15:52.9	22	311.15 km	12	11
13	(United Kingdom) Wales Rally GB (15–17 November) — Results and report	3	34	(United Kingdom) Mark Higgins (United Kingdom) Carl Williamson	(Belgium) Symtech Racing (Ford Fiesta R5)	3:16:57.7	22	311.15 km	12	11

== Championship standings ==
=== Drivers' championship ===
Points are awarded to the top 10 classified finishers.

Position	1st	2nd	3rd	4th	5th	6th	7th	8th	9th	10th
Points	25	18	15	12	10	8	6	4	2	1

Pos.	Driver	MON (Monaco)	SWE (Sweden)	MEX (Mexico)	POR (Portugal)	ARG (Argentina)	GRE (Greece)	ITA (Italy)	FIN (Finland)	GER (Germany)	AUS (Australia)	FRA (France)	ESP (Spain)	GBR (United Kingdom)	Drops	Points
1	(Poland) Robert Kubica				6		1	1	2	1		1	1		8	143
2	(Qatar) Abdulaziz Al-Kuwari			1	5	1	3	2			1			WD		118
3	(Ukraine) Yuriy Protasov	3	4	5		5	2	Ret			2				0	83
4	(Peru) Nicolás Fuchs		5	2	4	2	6	4					5		8	80
5	(Saudi Arabia) Yazeed Al-Rajhi		1		WD				4		3		2	8		74
6	(Germany) Sepp Wiegand	1	3		3			Ret		4			Ret	WD		67
7	(United Kingdom) Elfyn Evans				8				Ret	2		2	Ret	1		65
8	(Mexico) Ricardo Triviño	5	7	3		6	14			7		5			0	55
9	(Republic of Ireland) Robert Barrable				2				6	Ret		4	3	9		53
10	(United Arab Emirates) Rashid al Ketbi	4	8		Ret		5			6		3	Ret		0	49
11	(Finland) Jari Ketomaa								1					2		43
12	(Germany) Armin Kremer	2		4		Ret		5		Ret						40
13	(New Zealand) Hayden Paddon								3	3	5					40
14	(Argentina) Juan Carlos Alonso				9	4	10	6	Ret				6			31
15	(Kazakhstan) Arman Smailov		6		10		7	Ret	Ret		4					27
16	(Finland) Esapekka Lappi	Ret			1				11							25
17	(Italy) Edoardo Bresolin				7				5					6		24
18	(Norway) Anders Grøndal		2													18
19	(Venezuela) Alejandro Lombardo										6	6	WD	WD		16
20	(Jordan) Ala'a Rasheed				14		11	7				7	8			16
21	(Italy) Lorenzo Bertelli	Ret		Ret		Ret	Ret	3					Ret	11	0	15
22	(Argentina) Marcos Ligato				12	3	WD									15
23	(United Kingdom) Mark Higgins													3		15
24	(Italy) Marco Vallario		11		13		12	8		8		Ret	7		0	14
25	(Indonesia) Subhan Aksa				11		Ret			Ret	Ret		4	10		13
26	(Norway) Eyvind Brynildsen		Ret						10	Ret				4		13
27	(Ukraine) Oleksiy Tamrazov						4	WD	WD							12
28	(Ukraine) Valeriy Gorban			Ret			8	Ret	9			Ret		7		12
29	(Estonia) Karl Kruuda								Ret	5						10
30	(United Kingdom) Tom Cave													5		10
31	(Finland) Juha Salo								6							8
32	(Venezuela) Carlos Garcia Fessman								Ret	9	7	WD	WD	WD		8
33	(Ukraine) Oleksiy Kikireshko			Ret			9	Ret	8			Ret		Ret		6
34	(Czech Republic) Martin Hudec		10		WD				12			8				5
35	(Spain) Alexander Villanueva		9		Ret		Ret	WD	13					WD		2
Pos.	Driver	MON (Monaco)	SWE (Sweden)	MEX (Mexico)	POR (Portugal)	ARG (Argentina)	GRE (Greece)	ITA (Italy)	FIN (Finland)	GER (Germany)	AUS (Australia)	FRA (France)	ESP (Spain)	GBR (United Kingdom)	Drops	Points

Key
Colour	Result
Gold	Winner
Silver	2nd place
Bronze	3rd place
Green	Points finish
Blue	Non-points finish
Blue	Non-classified finish (NC)
Purple	Did not finish (Ret)
Black	Excluded (EX)
Black	Disqualified (DSQ)
White	Did not start (DNS)
White	Cancelled (C)
Blank	Withdrew entry from the event (WD)

=== Co-Drivers' Championship ===
Pos.	Driver	MON (Monaco)	SWE (Sweden)	MEX (Mexico)	POR (Portugal)	ARG (Argentina)	GRE (Greece)	ITA (Italy)	FIN (Finland)	GER (Germany)	AUS (Australia)	FRA (France)	ESP (Spain)	GBR (United Kingdom)	Drops	Points
1	(Poland) Maciej Baran				6		1	1	2	1		1	1		8	143
2	(Republic of Ireland) Kilian Duffy			1	5	1	3	2			1			WD		118
3	(Estonia) Kuldar Sikk	3	4	5		5	2	Ret			2				0	83
4	(Argentina) Fernando Mussano		5	2	4	2	6	4					5		8	80
5	(United Kingdom) Michael Orr		1						4		3		2	8		74
6	(Germany) Frank Christian	1	3		3			Ret		4			Ret	WD		67
7	(United Kingdom) Daniel Barritt				8				Ret	2		2	Ret	1		65
8	(Spain) Alex Haro	5	7	3		6	13			7	6				0	53
9	(United Kingdom) Stuart Loudon				2				6	Ret		4	3	9		52
10	(Germany) Karina Hepperle	4	8		Ret		4			6		3	Ret		0	49
11	(Germany) Klaus Wicha	2		4		Ret		5		Ret						40
12	(New Zealand) John Kennard								3	3	5					40
13	(Argentina) Juan Monasterolo				9	4	10	6	Ret				6			31
14	(Russia) Andrey Rusov		6		10		7	Ret	Ret		4					27
15	(Finland) Janne Ferm	Ret			1				11							25
16	(Finland) Marko Sallinen								1							25
17	(Italy) Rudy Pollet				7				5					6		24
18	(Norway) Trond Svendsen		2													18
19	(Lebanon) Joseph Matar				14		11	7				6	8			18
20	(Finland) Tapio Suominen													2		18
21	(Argentina) Rubén García				12	3	WD									15
22	(Italy) Mitia Dotta					Ret	Ret	3					Ret	11		15
23	(United Kingdom) Carl Williamson													3		15
24	(Italy) Antonio Pascale		11				12	8		8		Ret	7			14
25	(Italy) Nicola Arena				11		Ret			Ret	Ret		4	10		13
26	(Ukraine) Pavlo Cherepin						4	WD	WD							12
27	(Ukraine) Volodymyr Korsya				Ret		8	Ret	9			Ret		7		12
28	(France) Denis Giraudet													4		12
29	(Estonia) Martin Järveoja								Ret	5						10
30	(Ecuador) Luis Adolfo Espinosa											5	WD	WD		10
31	(United Kingdom) Ieuan Thomas													5		8
32	(Finland) Marko Salminen								6							8
33	(Portugal) Hugo Magalhães									9	7	WD	WD	WD		8
34	(Czech Republic) Jakub Kotál		10						12			7				7
35	(Ukraine) Andrii Nikolaiev								8			Ret		Ret		4
36	(Spain) Óscar Sánchez		9		Ret		Ret	WD	13					WD		2
37	(Estonia) Sergei Larens				Ret		9	Ret								2
38	(Sweden) Maria Andersson								10	Ret						1
Pos.	Driver	MON (Monaco)	SWE (Sweden)	MEX (Mexico)	POR (Portugal)	ARG (Argentina)	GRE (Greece)	ITA (Italy)	FIN (Finland)	GER (Germany)	AUS (Australia)	FRA (France)	ESP (Spain)	GBR (United Kingdom)	Drops	Points

Key
Colour	Result
Gold	Winner
Silver	2nd place
Bronze	3rd place
Green	Points finish
Blue	Non-points finish
Blue	Non-classified finish (NC)
Purple	Did not finish (Ret)
Black	Excluded (EX)
Black	Disqualified (DSQ)
White	Did not start (DNS)
White	Cancelled (C)
Blank	Withdrew entry from the event (WD)

=== Teams' championship ===
Pos.	Team	No.	MON (Monaco)	SWE (Sweden)	MEX (Mexico)	POR (Portugal)	ARG (Argentina)	GRE (Greece)	ITA (Italy)	FIN (Finland)	GER (Germany)	AUS (Australia)	FRA (France)	ESP (Spain)	GBR (United Kingdom)	Drops	Points
1	Seashore Qatar Rally Team	48			1	3	1	2	1			1			WD		133
2	(Saudi Arabia) Yazeed Racing	35		1		WD				2		3		1	8		87
3	(United Kingdom) Qatar M-Sport World Rally Team	75				5				Ret	1		1	Ret	1		85
4	(Germany) Škoda Auto Deutschland	32	1	2		2			Ret		2			Ret	WD		79
5	(Mexico) Moto Club Igualda	38	5	4	2		4	7			5		3			6	77
6	(Belgium) Symtech Racing	34	Ret	3	4		3								3		72
6	(Belgium) Symtech Racing	39	3														72
7	(United Arab Emirates) Skydive Dubai Rally Team	36	4	5		Ret		3			4		2	Ret		0	67
8	(United Kingdom) DMACK-Autotek	47		Ret						7	Ret				4		61
8	(United Kingdom) DMACK-Autotek	88								1					2		61
9	(Estonia) MM Motorsport	82						1	Ret	Ret	3	2					58
10	(Jordan) Motortune Racing	71				8		6	3				4	3			54
11	(Austria) Stohl Racing	33	2		3		Ret		2		Ret						51
12	(Ukraine) Mentos Ascania Racing	49				Ret		5	Ret	5			Ret		Ret		46
12	(Ukraine) Mentos Ascania Racing	50				Ret		4	Ret	6			Ret		7		46
13	(Italy) E2 Tre Colli World Rally Team	78				4				3					6		35
14	(Czech Republic) Semerád	43		6		WD				8			5		5		32
15	(Indonesia) Bosowa Rally Team	76				6		Ret			Ret	Ret		2	9		28
16	(Czech Republic) Škoda Motorsport	31	Ret			1											25
17	(Italy) Top Run SRL	77				7	2	WD									24
18	(Finland) Hannu's Rally Team	85								4							12
18	(Finland) Hannu's Rally Team	89								Ret							12
Pos.	Team	No.	MON (Monaco)	SWE (Sweden)	MEX (Mexico)	POR (Portugal)	ARG (Argentina)	GRE (Greece)	ITA (Italy)	FIN (Finland)	GER (Germany)	AUS (Australia)	FRA (France)	ESP (Spain)	GBR (United Kingdom)	Drops	Points

=== Production Cup for Drivers ===
Pos.	Driver	MON (Monaco)	SWE (Sweden)	MEX (Mexico)	POR (Portugal)	ARG (Argentina)	GRE (Greece)	ITA (Italy)	FIN (Finland)	GER (Germany)	AUS (Australia)	FRA (France)	ESP (Spain)	GBR (United Kingdom)	Drops	Points
1	(Peru) Nicolás Fuchs		2	1	1	1	1	1					1		18	150
2	(Mexico) Ricardo Triviño	2	4	2		4	5			1		1			10	110
3	(Argentina) Juan Carlos Alonso				2	3	3	3	Ret				2			81
4	(Kazakhstan) Arman Smailov		3		3		2	Ret	Ret		1					73
5	(Italy) Marco Vallario		7		5		4	4		2		Ret	3		6	67
6	(Germany) Armin Kremer	1		3		Ret		2								58
7	(Czech Republic) Martin Hudec		6		WD				1			3				48
8	(Venezuela) Alejandro Lombardo										2	2	WD	WD		36
9	(Argentina) Marcos Ligato				4	2	WD									30
10	(Venezuela) Carlos Garcia Fessman								Ret	3	3	WD	WD	WD		30
11	(Spain) Alexander Villanueva		5		Ret		Ret	WD	2					WD		28
12	(Norway) Anders Grøndal		1													25
13	(Venezuela) Jose Alexander Gelvez								3			WD		WD		15
Pos.	Driver	MON (Monaco)	SWE (Sweden)	MEX (Mexico)	POR (Portugal)	ARG (Argentina)	GRE (Greece)	ITA (Italy)	FIN (Finland)	GER (Germany)	AUS (Australia)	FRA (France)	ESP (Spain)	GBR (United Kingdom)	Drops	Points

=== Production Cup for Co-Drivers ===
Pos.	Driver	MON (Monaco)	SWE (Sweden)	MEX (Mexico)	POR (Portugal)	ARG (Argentina)	GRE (Greece)	ITA (Italy)	FIN (Finland)	GER (Germany)	AUS (Australia)	FRA (France)	ESP (Spain)	GBR (United Kingdom)	Drops	Points
1	(Argentina) Fernando Mussano		2	1	1	1	1	1					1		18	150
2	(Spain) Alex Haro	2	4	2		4	5			1	2				10	103
3	(Argentina) Juan Monasterolo				2	3	3	3	Ret				2			81
4	(Russia) Andrey Rusov		3		3		2	Ret	Ret		1					73
5	(Germany) Klaus Wicha	1		3		Ret		2								58
6	(Czech Republic) Jakub Kotál		6						1			2				51
7	(Italy) Antonio Pascale		7				4	4		2		Ret	3			51
8	(Argentina) Rubén García				4	2	WD									30
9	(Portugal) Hugo Magalhães									3	3	WD	WD	WD		30
10	(Spain) Óscar Sánchez		5		Ret		Ret	WD	2					WD		28
11	(Norway) Trond Svendsen		1													25
12	(Ecuador) Luis Adolfo Espinosa											1	WD	WD		25
13	(Mexico) Gabriel Marín Jr								3							15
14	(Italy) Manuela di Lorenzo				5											10
Pos.	Driver	MON (Monaco)	SWE (Sweden)	MEX (Mexico)	POR (Portugal)	ARG (Argentina)	GRE (Greece)	ITA (Italy)	FIN (Finland)	GER (Germany)	AUS (Australia)	FRA (France)	ESP (Spain)	GBR (United Kingdom)	Drops	Points
