= 2010 Rally Finland =

Motor rally competition

2010 Rally Finland 60th Neste Oil Rally Finland
Round 8 of the 2010 World Rally Championship
← Previous event	Next event →
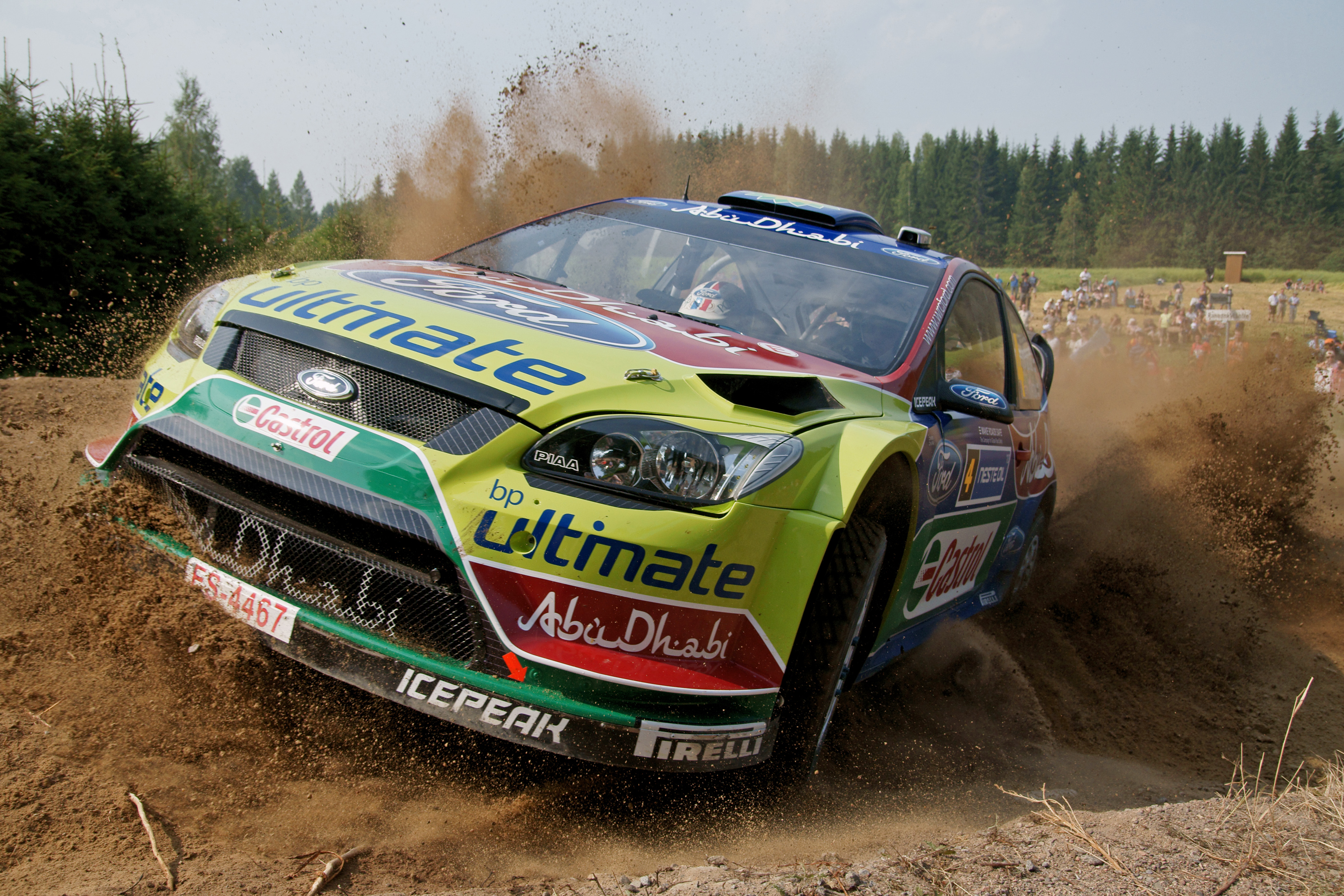
- Rally winner Jari-Matti Latvala during the shakedown in Muurame.
- Host country: Finland
- Rally base: Jyväskylä, Finland
- Dates run: July 29 – 31 2010
- Stages: 19 (310.29 km; 192.81 miles)
- Stage surface: Gravel
- Overall distance: 1,308.17 km (812.86 miles)

Statistics
- Crews: 99 at start, 61 at finish

Overall results
- Overall winner: (Finland) Jari-Matti Latvala (United Kingdom) BP Ford Abu Dhabi WRT

The 2010 Neste Oil Rally Finland was the 60th Rally Finland and the eighth round of the 2010 World Rally Championship season. The rally took place over July 29–31, and is based in Jyväskylä, the capital of the Central Finland region. The rally was also the fifth round of the Production World Rally Championship and the sixth round of the Super 2000 World Rally Championship.

Jari-Matti Latvala took his second victory of the season, and the fourth of his WRC career after holding off the Citroën C4s of Sébastien Ogier, Sébastien Loeb and Petter Solberg, as the four drivers were separated by just over 30 seconds at the rally's conclusion. Four time world champion Juha Kankkunen finished 8th, having entered the rally to celebrate its sixtieth anniversary.

In the junior classes, Intercontinental Rally Challenge championship leader Juho Hänninen made a guest appearance in the Super 2000 class, and wound up winning the class and taking two overall championship points for ninth position. Per-Gunnar Andersson also claimed an overall point, as he finished second in class. One of the selections for the Pirelli Star Driver and a protégé of former WRC driver Markko Märtin, Ott Tänak claimed victory in the PWRC, on his first appearance in the class this season.

== Entry list ==
No.	Driver	Co-driver	Entrant	Car	Gr.	Cl.
1	(France) Sébastien Loeb	(Monaco) Daniel Elena	(France) Citroën Total World Rally Team	Citroën C4 WRC	A	8
2	(France) Sébastien Ogier	(France) Julien Ingrassia	(France) Citroën Total World Rally Team	Citroën C4 WRC	A	8
3	(Finland) Mikko Hirvonen	(Finland) Jarmo Lehtinen	(United Kingdom) BP Ford Abu Dhabi World Rally Team	Ford Focus RS WRC 09	A	8
4	(Finland) Jari-Matti Latvala	(Finland) Miikka Anttila	(United Kingdom) BP Ford Abu Dhabi World Rally Team	Ford Focus RS WRC 09	A	8
5	(United Kingdom) Matthew Wilson	(United Kingdom) Scott Martin	(United Kingdom) Stobart M-Sport Ford Rally Team	Ford Focus RS WRC 08	A	8
6	(Norway) Henning Solberg	(Austria) Ilka Minor	(United Kingdom) Stobart M-Sport Ford Rally Team	Ford Focus RS WRC 08	A	8
7	(Spain) Daniel Sordo	(Spain) Marc Martí	(France) Citroën Junior Team	Citroën C4 WRC	A	8
8	(Finland) Kimi Räikkönen	(Finland) Kaj Lindström	(France) Citroën Junior Team	Citroën C4 WRC	A	8
11	(Norway) Petter Solberg	(United Kingdom) Chris Patterson	(Norway) Petter Solberg World Rally Team	Citroën C4 WRC	A	8
12	(Finland) Juha Kankkunen	(Finland) Juha Repo	(United Kingdom) Stobart M-Sport Ford Rally Team	Ford Focus RS WRC 08	A	8
14	(United Arab Emirates) Khalid Al-Qassimi	(United Kingdom) Michael Orr	(United Kingdom) BP Ford Abu Dhabi World Rally Team	Ford Focus RS WRC 08	A	8
15	(Norway) Mads Østberg	(Sweden) Jonas Andersson	(Norway) Adapta Motorsport	Subaru Impreza WRC 2007	A	8
16	(Finland) Jouni Ampuja	(Finland) Mika Rajasalo	(Finland) WordDive	Subaru Impreza WRC 2007	A	8
17	(Finland) Mattias Therman	(Finland) Janne Perälä	(United Kingdom) Stobart M-Sport Ford Rally Team	Ford Focus RS WRC 08	A	8
18	(Finland) Jouni Arolainen	(Finland) Matti-Jussi Partanen	(Finland) Jouni Arolainen	Ford Focus RS WRC 05	A	8
21	(Czech Republic) Martin Prokop	(Czech Republic) Jan Tománek	(Czech Republic) Czech Ford National Team	Ford Fiesta S2000	N	4
22	(Qatar) Nasser Al-Attiyah	(Italy) Giovanni Bernacchini	(Qatar) Barwa Rally Team	Ford Fiesta S2000	N	4
23	(Poland) Michał Kościuszko	(Poland) Maciej Szczepaniak	(Poland) Dynamic World Rally Team	Škoda Fabia S2000	N	4
24	(Sweden) Patrik Sandell	(Sweden) Emil Axelsson	(Austria) Red Bull Rallye Team	Škoda Fabia S2000	N	4
27	(Finland) Janne Tuohino	(Finland) Marko Sallinen	(Finland) JanPro	Ford Fiesta S2000	N	4
29	(Finland) Jari Ketomaa	(Finland) Mika Stenberg	(China) Shanghai FCACA Rally Team	Ford Fiesta S2000	N	4
30	(Andorra) Albert Llovera	(Spain) Borja Rozada	(Andorra) Albert Llovera	Fiat Abarth Grande Punto S2000	N	4
34	(Czech Republic) Martin Semerád	(Czech Republic) Michal Ernst	(Czech Republic) Czech National Team	Mitsubishi Lancer Evolution IX	N	4
36	(Lebanon) Nicholai Georgiou	(Lebanon) Joseph Matar	(Italy) Pirelli Star Driver	Mitsubishi Lancer Evolution X	N	4
37	(South Africa) Peter Horsey	(United Kingdom) Calvin Cooledge	(Italy) Pirelli Star Driver	Mitsubishi Lancer Evolution X	N	4
38	(New Zealand) Hayden Paddon	(New Zealand) John Kennard	(Italy) Pirelli Star Driver	Mitsubishi Lancer Evolution X	N	4
39	(San Marino) Alex Raschi	(Italy) Rudy Pollet	(Italy) Pirelli Star Driver	Mitsubishi Lancer Evolution X	N	4
40	(Estonia) Ott Tänak	(Estonia) Kuldar Sikk	(Italy) Pirelli Star Driver	Mitsubishi Lancer Evolution X	N	4
41	(Italy) Alessandro Bruschetta	(Italy) Edoardo Civiero	(Italy) Hawk Racing Club SRL	Subaru Impreza WRX STi	N	4
42	(Argentina) Miguel Angel Baldoni	(Argentina) José Díaz	(Argentina) Miguel Angel Baldoni	Mitsubishi Lancer Evolution IX	N	4
43	(Finland) Reijo Muhonen	(Finland) Miika Teiskonen	(Finland) Reijo Muhonen	Mitsubishi Lancer Evolution X	N	4
44	(Brazil) Paulo Nobre	(Brazil) Edu Paula	(Brazil) Palmeirinha Rally	Mitsubishi Lancer Evolution X	N	4
45	(China) Rui Wang	(China) Yiping Chen	(China) Shanghai FCACA Rally Team	Subaru Impreza WRX STi	N	4
46	(Norway) Anders Grøndal	(Norway) Veronica Engan	(Norway) Anders Grøndal WRC Rally Team	Subaru Impreza WRX STi	N	4
47	(Portugal) Nuno Barroso Pereira	(Portugal) Pedro Conde	(Finland) Tommi Mäkinen Racing Oy	Subaru Impreza WRX STi	N	4
48	(Sweden) Patrik Flodin	(Sweden) Göran Bergsten	(Russia) Uspenskiy Rally Tecnica	Subaru Impreza WRX STi	N	4
49	(Finland) Juha Salo	(Finland) Jarkko Kalliolepo	Team Mitsubishi Ralliart Finland	Mitsubishi Lancer Evolution X	N	4
50	(Finland) Jukka Ketomäki	(Finland) Kai Risberg	(Finland) Kai Risberg	Mitsubishi Lancer Evolution X	N	4
51	(Finland) Juho Hänninen	(Finland) Mikko Markkula	(Finland) Juho Hänninen	Škoda Fabia S2000	N	4
52	(Finland) Matti Rantanen	(Finland) Mikko Lukka	(Finland) Matti Rantanen	Škoda Fabia S2000	N	4
53	(Sweden) Per-Gunnar Andersson	(Sweden) Anders Fredriksson	(Czech Republic) RUFA Sport	Škoda Fabia S2000	N	4
54	(Mexico) Michel Jourdain Jr.	(Spain) Óscar Sánchez	(Mexico) Nextel-Televisa Deportes WRT	Mitsubishi Lancer Evolution IX	N	4
61	(Netherlands) Dennis Kuipers	(Belgium) Frédéric Miclotte	(United Kingdom) Stobart M-Sport Ford Rally Team	Ford Fiesta S2000	N	4

== Results ==
=== Event standings ===
Pos.	Driver	Co-driver	Car	Time	Difference	Points
Overall
1.	(Finland) Jari-Matti Latvala	(Finland) Miikka Anttila	Ford Focus RS WRC 09	2:31:29.6	0.0	25
2.	(France) Sébastien Ogier	(France) Julien Ingrassia	Citroën C4 WRC	2:31:39.7	10.1	18
3.	(France) Sébastien Loeb	(Monaco) Daniel Elena	Citroën C4 WRC	2:31:55.6	26.0	15
4.	(Norway) Petter Solberg	(United Kingdom) Chris Patterson	Citroën C4 WRC	2:32:00.3	30.7	12
5.	(Spain) Dani Sordo	(Spain) Marc Martí	Citroën C4 WRC	2:33:14.6	1:45.0	10
6.	(United Kingdom) Matthew Wilson	(United Kingdom) Scott Martin	Ford Focus RS WRC 08	2:37:13.3	5:43.7	8
7.	(Norway) Mads Østberg	(Sweden) Jonas Andersson	Subaru Impreza WRC 2007	2:37:20.4	5:50.8	6
8.	(Finland) Juha Kankkunen	(Finland) Juha Repo	Ford Focus RS WRC 08	2:39:18.6	7:49.0	4
9.	(Finland) Juho Hänninen	(Finland) Mikko Markkula	Škoda Fabia S2000	2:40:34.6	9:05.0	2
10.	(Sweden) Per-Gunnar Andersson	(Sweden) Anders Fredriksson	Škoda Fabia S2000	2:41:45.3	10:15.7	1
SWRC
1. (9.)	(Finland) Juho Hänninen	(Finland) Mikko Markkula	Škoda Fabia S2000	2:40:34.6	0.0	25
2. (10.)	(Sweden) Per-Gunnar Andersson	(Sweden) Anders Fredriksson	Škoda Fabia S2000	2:41:45.3	1:10.7	18
3. (11.)	(Sweden) Patrik Sandell	(Sweden) Emil Axelsson	Škoda Fabia S2000	2:42:04.6	1:30.0	15
4. (13.)	(Czech Republic) Martin Prokop	(Czech Republic) Jan Tománek	Ford Fiesta S2000	2:44:41.8	4:07.2	12
5. (16.)	(Poland) Michał Kościuszko	(Poland) Maciek Szczepaniak	Ford Fiesta S2000	2:46:29.7	5:55.1	10
6. (17.)	(Finland) Janne Tuohino	(Finland) Markku Tuohino	Ford Fiesta S2000	2:46:44.3	6:09.7	8
7. (29.)	(Qatar) Nasser Al-Attiyah	(Italy) Giovanni Bernacchini	Ford Fiesta S2000	2:57:50.1	17:15.5	6
PWRC
1. (18.)	(Estonia) Ott Tänak	(Estonia) Kuldar Sikk	Mitsubishi Lancer Evo X	2:46:50.5	0.0	25
2. (20.)	(Finland) Jukka Ketomäki	(Finland) Kai Risberg	Mitsubishi Lancer Evo X	2:48:18.8	1:28.3	18
3. (21.)	(New Zealand) Hayden Paddon	(New Zealand) John Kennard	Mitsubishi Lancer Evo X	2:49:56.5	3:06.0	15
4. (24.)	(Norway) Anders Grøndal	(Norway) Veronica Engan	Subaru Impreza WRX STI	2:51:45.8	4:55.3	12
5. (28.)	(San Marino) Alex Raschi	(Italy) Rudy Pollet	Mitsubishi Lancer Evo X	2:57:03.6	10:13.1	10
6. (30.)	(Czech Republic) Martin Semerád	(Czech Republic) Bohuslav Ceplecha	Mitsubishi Lancer Evo IX	2:58:26.7	11:36.2	8
7. (32.)	(Finland) Reijo Muhonen	(Finland) Lasse Miettinen	Mitsubishi Lancer Evo X	2:59:52.5	13:02.0	6
8. (39.)	(China) Wang Rui	(China) Pan Hongyu	Subaru Impreza WRX STI	3:04:53.4	18:02.9	4
9. (40.)	(Kenya) Peter Horsey	(Uganda) Moses Matovu	Mitsubishi Lancer Evo X	3:05:15.6	18:25.1	2
10. (41.)	(Lebanon) Nicholai Georgiou	(Lebanon) Joseph Matar	Mitsubishi Lancer Evo X	3:05:58.2	19:07.7	1

=== Special stages ===
All dates and times are EEST (UTC+3).

Day	Stage	Time	Name	Length	Winner	Time	Avg. spd.	Rally leader
1 (29–30 July)	SS1	18:45	Laajavuori 1	4.31 km	(Norway) Petter Solberg	2:33.2	98.46 km/h	(Norway) Petter Solberg
1 (29–30 July)	SS2	07:42	Urria 1	12.75 km	(Finland) Mikko Hirvonen	5:55.8	129.01 km/h	(Finland) Mikko Hirvonen
1 (29–30 July)	SS3	08:40	Jukojärvi 1	22.29 km	(Finland) Mikko Hirvonen	10:33.7	126.63 km/h	(Finland) Mikko Hirvonen
1 (29–30 July)	SS4	10:06	Urria 2	12.75 km	(France) Sébastien Ogier	5:52.9	130.07 km/h	(Norway) Petter Solberg
1 (29–30 July)	SS5	11:04	Jukojärvi 2	22.29 km	(Spain) Dani Sordo	10:28.7	127.63 km/h	(Norway) Petter Solberg
1 (29–30 July)	SS6	13:58	Lankamaa	24.87 km	(Finland) Jari-Matti Latvala	12:03.3	123.78 km/h	(Norway) Petter Solberg
1 (29–30 July)	SS7	15:01	Sirkkamäki 1	6.45 km	(Finland) Jari-Matti Latvala	3:04.4	125.92 km/h	(Finland) Jari-Matti Latvala
1 (29–30 July)	SS8	15:36	Myhinpää 1	15.52 km	(France) Sébastien Loeb	7:07.8	130.60 km/h	(Finland) Jari-Matti Latvala
1 (29–30 July)	SS9	17:27	Sirkkamäki 2	6.45 km	(Finland) Jari-Matti Latvala	3:01.4	128.00 km/h	(Finland) Jari-Matti Latvala
1 (29–30 July)	SS10	18:02	Myhinpää 2	15.52 km	(France) Sébastien Loeb	6:59.8	133.09 km/h	(Finland) Jari-Matti Latvala
1 (29–30 July)	SS11	20:00	Laajavuori 2	4.19 km	(Norway) Petter Solberg	2:35.1	97.25 km/h	(Finland) Jari-Matti Latvala
2 (31 July)	SS12	07:33	Kolonkulma	10.35 km	(France) Sébastien Ogier	5:06.4	121.61 km/h	(Finland) Jari-Matti Latvala
2 (31 July)	SS13	08:01	Väärinmaja	29.29 km	(France) Sébastien Loeb	14:46.9	118.89 km/h	(Finland) Jari-Matti Latvala
2 (31 July)	SS14	09:44	Surkee 1	19.59 km	(Finland) Jari-Matti Latvala	9:56.4	118.25 km/h	(Finland) Jari-Matti Latvala
2 (31 July)	SS15	11:59	Leustu 1	21.35 km	(France) Sébastien Loeb	10:08.8	126.25 km/h	(Finland) Jari-Matti Latvala
2 (31 July)	SS16	12:46	Himos 1	20.63 km	(France) Sébastien Loeb	10:28.5	118.17 km/h	(Finland) Jari-Matti Latvala
2 (31 July)	SS17	14:03	Surkee 2	19.59 km	(France) Sébastien Ogier	9:53.6	118.81 km/h	(Finland) Jari-Matti Latvala
2 (31 July)	SS18	16:23	Leustu 2	21.35 km	(Finland) Jari-Matti Latvala	9:59.9	128.12 km/h	(Finland) Jari-Matti Latvala
2 (31 July)	SS19	17:10	Himos 2	20.63 km	(France) Sébastien Ogier	10:15.7	120.62 km/h	(Finland) Jari-Matti Latvala

=== Standings after the rally ===
Drivers' Championship standings

Pos.	Driver	Points
1	(France) Sébastien Loeb	166
2	(France) Sebastien Ogier	118
3	(Finland) Jari-Matti Latvala	105
4	(Norway) Petter Solberg	90
5	(Finland) Mikko Hirvonen	86
6	(Spain) Dani Sordo	77
7	(United Kingdom) Matthew Wilson	48
8	(Argentina) Federico Villagra	26
9	(Norway) Henning Solberg	25
10	(Norway) Mads Ostberg	16

Manufacturers' Championship standings

Pos.	Manufacturer	Points
1	(France) Citroen WRT	265
2	(United Kingdom) BP Ford WRT	210
3	(France) Citroen Junior Team	145
4	(United Kingdom) Stobart Ford	108
5	(Argentina) Munchi's Ford	40
