= Martin Hudec (rally driver) =

Czech rally driver (born 1980)

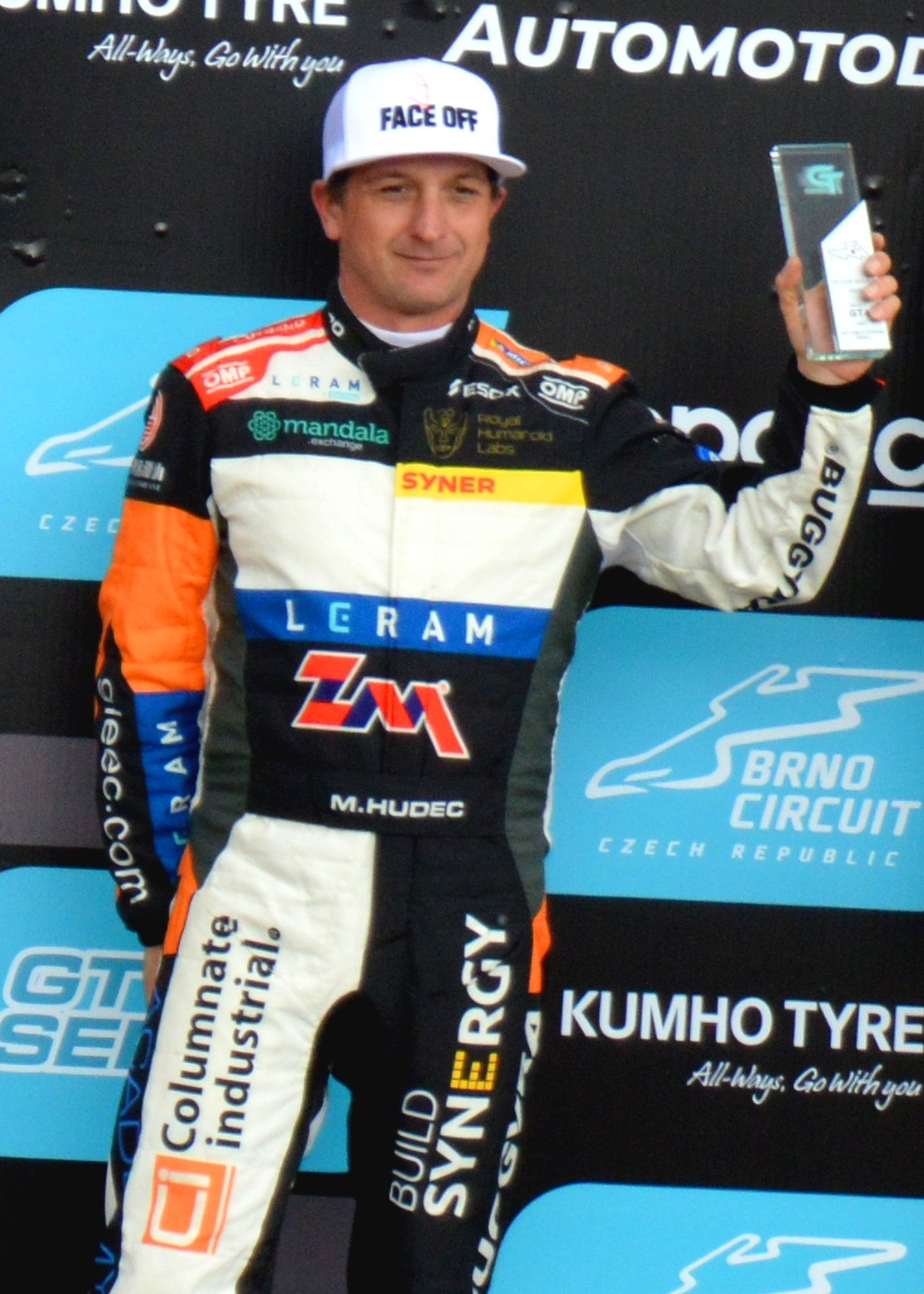
- Hudec at the Brno Circuit in 2025

Personal information
- Nationality: Czech
- Born: June 27, 1980 (age 46)

World Rally Championship record
- Years active: 2013–present
- Teams: Semerád Rally Team
- Rallies: 2
- Championships: 0
- Rally wins: 0
- Podiums: 0
- Stage wins: 0
- Total points: 0
- First rally: 2013 Rally Sweden

Martin Hudec (born 27 June 1980) is a Czech rally and circuit racing driver. He is racing in the WRC-2 since the 2013 season, making his World Rally Championship debut at the 2013 Rally Sweden.

In 2025, he is taking part in the 2025 GT Cup Series. He is driving a Mercedes AMG GT4 for Buggyra ZM Racing team, partnering with teammate Miroslav Mikeš. Alongside his rally career, he has also found success in other circuit racing categories, including achieving a GT3 podium finish at the Slovakiaring in the Central European Eset Cup Series.

== Career results ==
=== WRC results ===
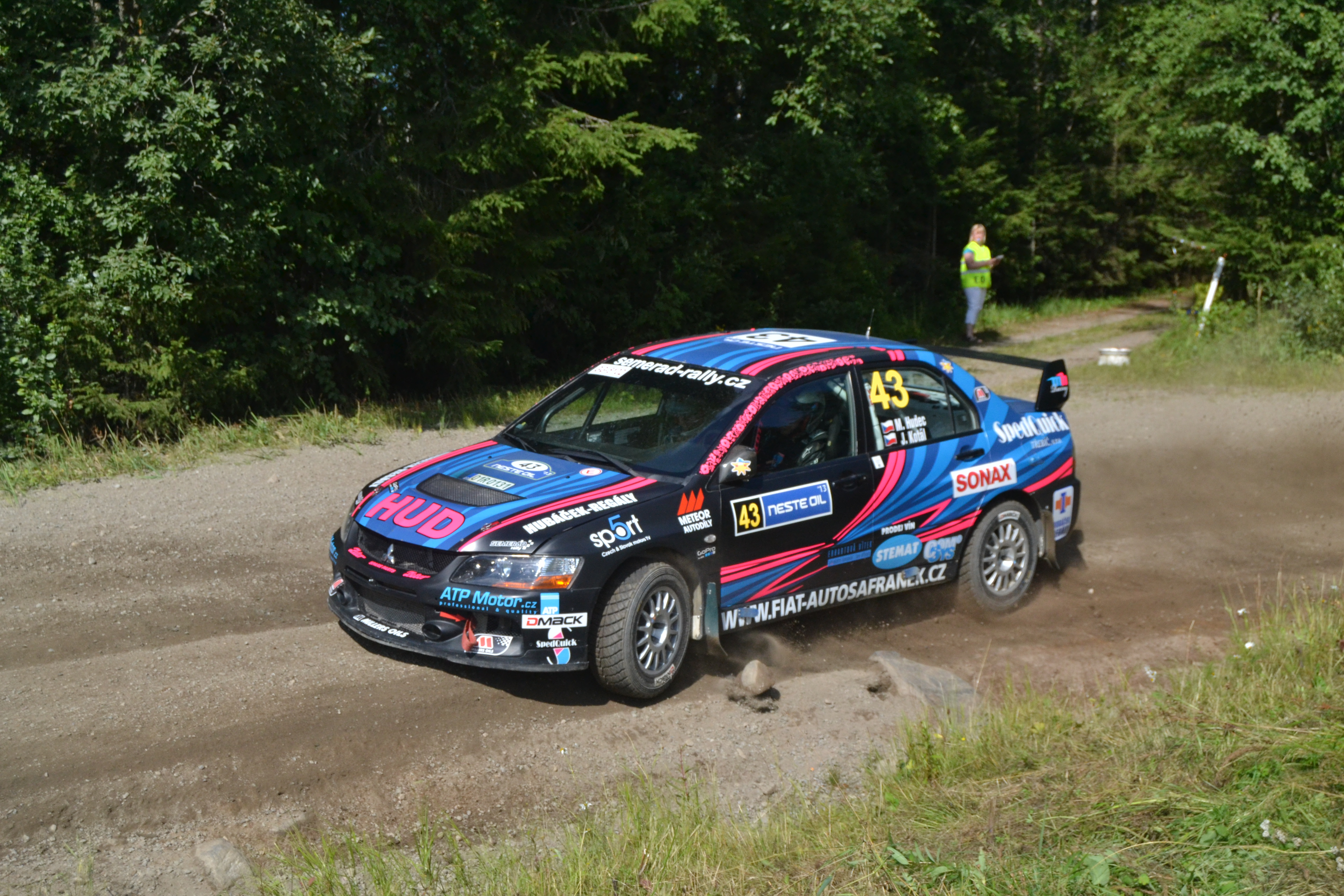
Hudec at the 2013 Rally Finland

Year	Entrant	Car	1	2	3	4	5	6	7	8	9	10	11	12	13	WDC	Points
2013	Semerád Rally Team	Mitsubishi Lancer Evo IX	MON	SWE; 31	MEX	POR; WD	ARG	GRE	ITA	FIN; 38	GER	AUS	FRA	ESP	GBR	-*	0*

* Season still in progress.

==== WRC 2 results ====
Year	Entrant	Car	1	2	3	4	5	6	7	8	9	10	11	12	13	WRC 2	Points
2013	Semerád Rally Team	Mitsubishi Lancer Evo IX	MON	SWE; 10	MEX	POR; WD	ARG	GRE	ITA	FIN; 12	GER	AUS	FRA	ESP	GBR	29th*	1*

* Season still in progress.

=== Czech Rally Championship results ===
Year	Entrant	Car	1	2	3	4	5	6	7	8	MMČR	Points
2009	Krimi Stop	Mitsubishi Lancer Evo IX	VAL; 24	ŠUM	KRU	HUS	BAR	PŘÍ	BOH		-	0
2011	Toba Czech Racing	Mitsubishi Lancer Evo IX	VAL; 20	ŠUM -	KRU; 20	HUS; 11	BOH; Ret	BAR; Ret	PŘÍ; 17		26th	5
2012	SAS Zlín	Mitsubishi Lancer Evo IX	JÄN; 8								9th	34
2012	SF-CZ.cz	Mitsubishi Lancer Evo IX		VAL; Ret	ŠUM; 10	KRU; 10	HUS; Ret	BOH -			9th	34
2012	Semerád Rally Team	Mitsubishi Lancer Evo IX							BAR; 23	PŘÍ; 5	9th	34
2013	Semerád Rally Team	Mitsubishi Lancer Evo IX	JÄN; Ret	ŠUM	KRU	HUS	BOH	BAR	PŘÍ		31st*	2*

* Season still in progress.
