= Juha Salo =

Finnish rally driver

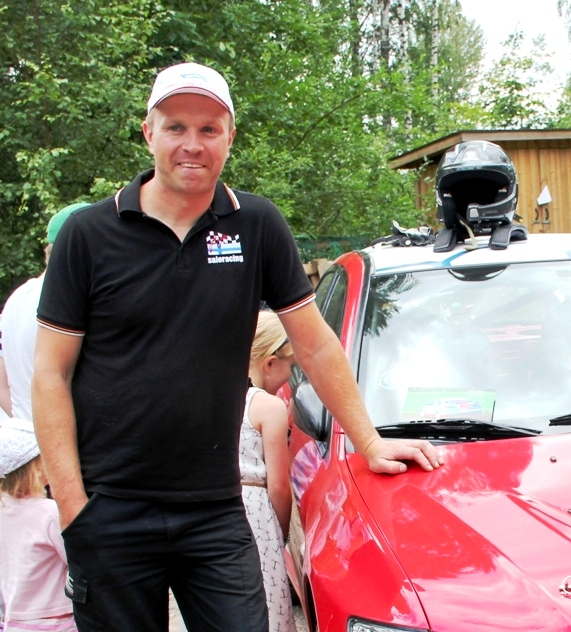
- Juha Salo 2014.

Personal information
- Nationality: (Finland) Finnish
- Born: February 28, 1976 (age 50)

World Rally Championship record
- Years active: 1993–2023
- Teams: Ralliart Finland, Proton
- Rallies: 16
- Championships: 0
- Rally wins: 0
- Podiums: 0
- Stage wins: 0
- Total points: 0
- First rally: 1997 Rally Finland
- Last rally: 2016 Rally Finland

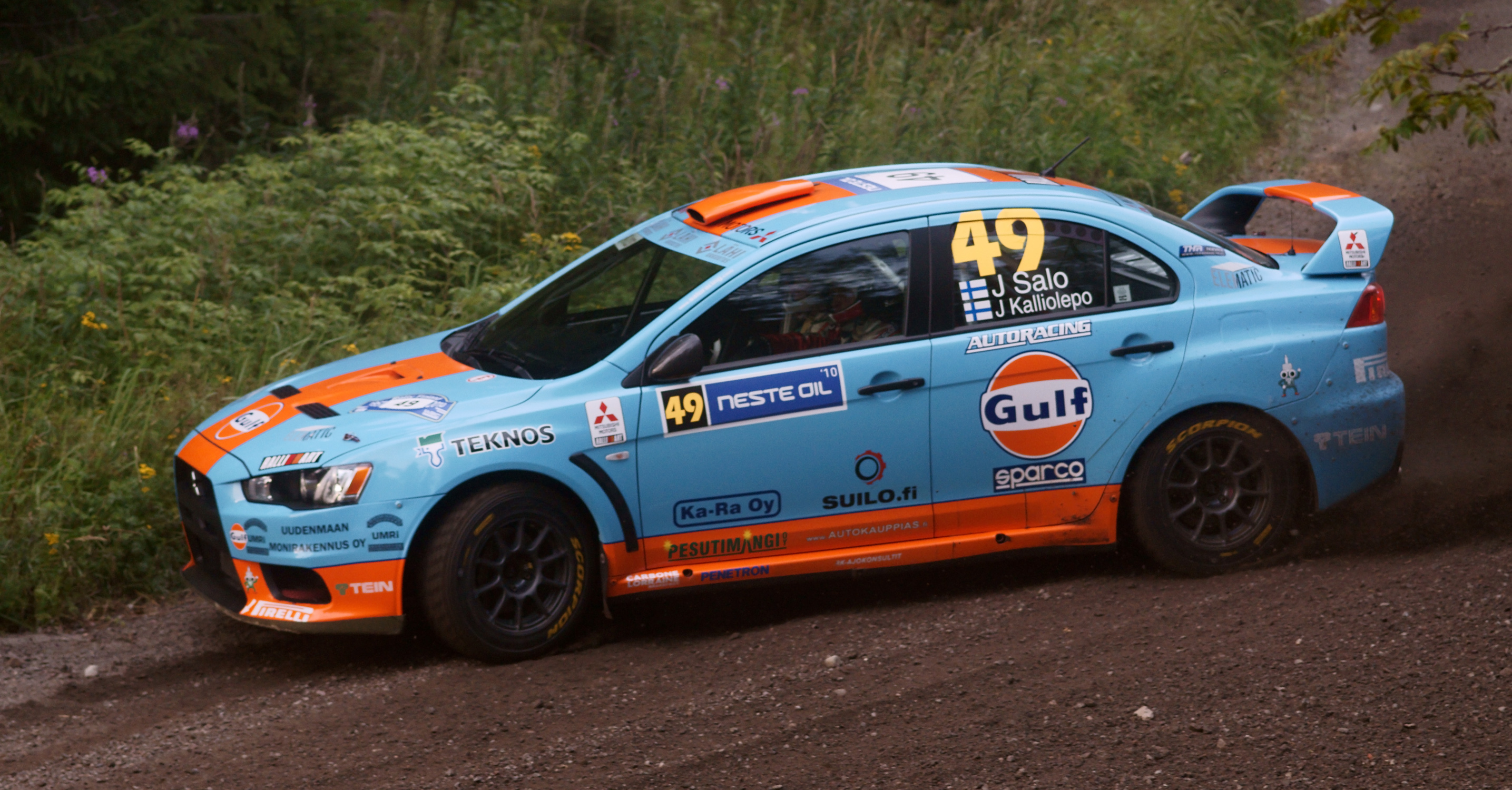
Salo driving his Mitsubishi Lancer Evolution X at the 2010 Rally Finland.

Juha Salo (born February 28, 1976) is a Finnish former rally driver. He won the Finnish Rally Championship nine times in 2002, 2004, 2005, 2008, 2010, 2011, 2013, 2015 and 2016. In 2012, he placed third at the Neste Oil Rally Finland. He took first place with Kristian Temonen in the Finnish Rally Championship final in Kokkola before retiring in 2023. He is of no relation to Mika Salo.

== Complete WRC results ==
Year	Entrant	Car	1	2	3	4	5	6	7	8	9	10	11	12	13	14	15	16	WDC	Points
1997	Juha Salo	Opel Astra GSI 16V	MON	SWE	KEN	POR	ESP	FRA	ARG	GRE	NZL	FIN; Ret	IDN	ITA	AUS	GBR			NC	0
1999	Juha Salo	Mitsubishi Lancer Evolution III	MON	SWE	KEN	POR	ESP	FRA	ARG	GRE	NZL	FIN; 26	CHN	ITA	AUS	GBR			NC	0
2000	Juha Salo	Mitsubishi Lancer Evolution III	MON	SWE	KEN	POR	ESP	ARG	GRE	NZL	FIN; Ret	CYP	FRA	ITA	AUS	GBR			NC	0
2001	Juha Salo	Mitsubishi Carisma GT	MON	SWE	POR	ESP	ARG	CYP	GRE	KEN	FIN; Ret	NZL	ITA	FRA	AUS				NC	0
2002	Juha Salo	Mitsubishi Lancer Evolution VII	MON	SWE	FRA	ESP	CYP	ARG	GRE	KEN	FIN; Ret	GER	ITA	NZL	AUS	GBR			NC	0
2003	Juha Salo	Mitsubishi Lancer Evolution VII	MON	SWE; 28	TUR	NZL	ARG	GRE	CYP	GER	FIN; 15	AUS	ITA	FRA	ESP	GBR			NC	0
2005	Juha Salo	Mitsubishi Lancer Evolution VIII	MON	SWE	MEX	NZL	ITA	CYP	TUR	GRE	ARG	FIN; Ret	GER	GBR	JPN	FRA	ESP	AUS	NC	0
2008	Mitsubishi Ralliart Finland	Mitsubishi Lancer Evolution IX	MON	SWE	MEX	ARG	JOR	ITA	GRE	TUR	FIN; Ret	GER	NZL	ESP	FRA	JPN	GBR		NC	0
2010	Mitsubishi Ralliart Finland	Mitsubishi Lancer Evolution X	SWE	MEX	JOR	TUR	NZL	POR	BUL	FIN; Ret	GER	JPN	FRA	ESP	GBR				NC	0
2011	Juha Salo	Mitsubishi Lancer Evolution X	SWE	MEX	POR	JOR	ITA; 30	ARG	GRE										NC	0
2011	Juha Salo	Mitsubishi Lancer Evolution X R4								FIN; 35	GER	AUS	FRA	ESP	GBR				NC	0
2012	Proton Motorsports	Proton Satria Neo S2000	MON	SWE	MEX	POR	ARG	GRE	NZL	FIN; 18	GER	GBR	FRA	ITA	ESP				NC	0
2013	Hannu's Rally Team	Subaru Impreza STi R4	MON	SWE	MEX	POR	ARG	GRE	ITA; 14	FIN	GER	AUS	FRA	ESP	GBR				NC	0
2016	Juha Salo	Peugeot 208 T16	MON	SWE	MEX	ARG	POR	ITA	POL	FIN; Ret	GER	CHN; C	FRA	ESP	GBR	AUS			NC	0

=== PWRC results ===
Year	Entrant	Car	1	2	3	4	5	6	7	8	9	PWRC	Points
2008	Mitsubishi Ralliart Finland	Mitsubishi Lancer Evo IX	SWE	ARG	GRE	TUR	FIN; Ret	NZL	JPN	GBR		NC	0
2010	Mitsubishi Ralliart Finland	Mitsubishi Lancer Evo X	SWE	MEX	JOR	NZL	FIN; Ret	GER	JPN	FRA	GBR	NC	0

=== SWRC results ===
Year	Entrant	Car	1	2	3	4	5	6	7	8	SWRC	Points
2011	Juha Salo	Mitsubishi Lancer Evolution X R4	MEX	JOR	ITA	GRE	FIN; 8	GER	FRA	ESP	12th	4
2012	Proton Motorsports	Proton Satria Neo S2000	MON	SWE	POR	NZL	FIN; 3	GBR	FRA	ESP	10th	15
