= Pirelli Star Driver =

Racecar driver development program by FIA and Pirelli

Pirelli Star Driver was an initiative to support young rally drivers, organised by Pirelli and the Fédération Internationale de l'Automobile (FIA).

== History ==
For the first two years of the scheme, 2009 and 2010, five drivers were selected from four FIA Championships, one from the African Rally Championship, one from the Asia-Pacific Rally Championship, two from the European Rally Championship and one from the Middle East Rally Championship. The driver selection process was conducted by each individual FIA region.

The five drivers then competed in six events of the World Rally Championship, driving in identical Mitsubishi Lancer Evolution X, prepared by Ralliart Italy.

The scheme was changed for the 2011 season. 16 drivers were nominated for a global shootout, from which six drivers were selected. They will compete in the new WRC Academy in Ford Fiesta R2s.

== Drivers ==
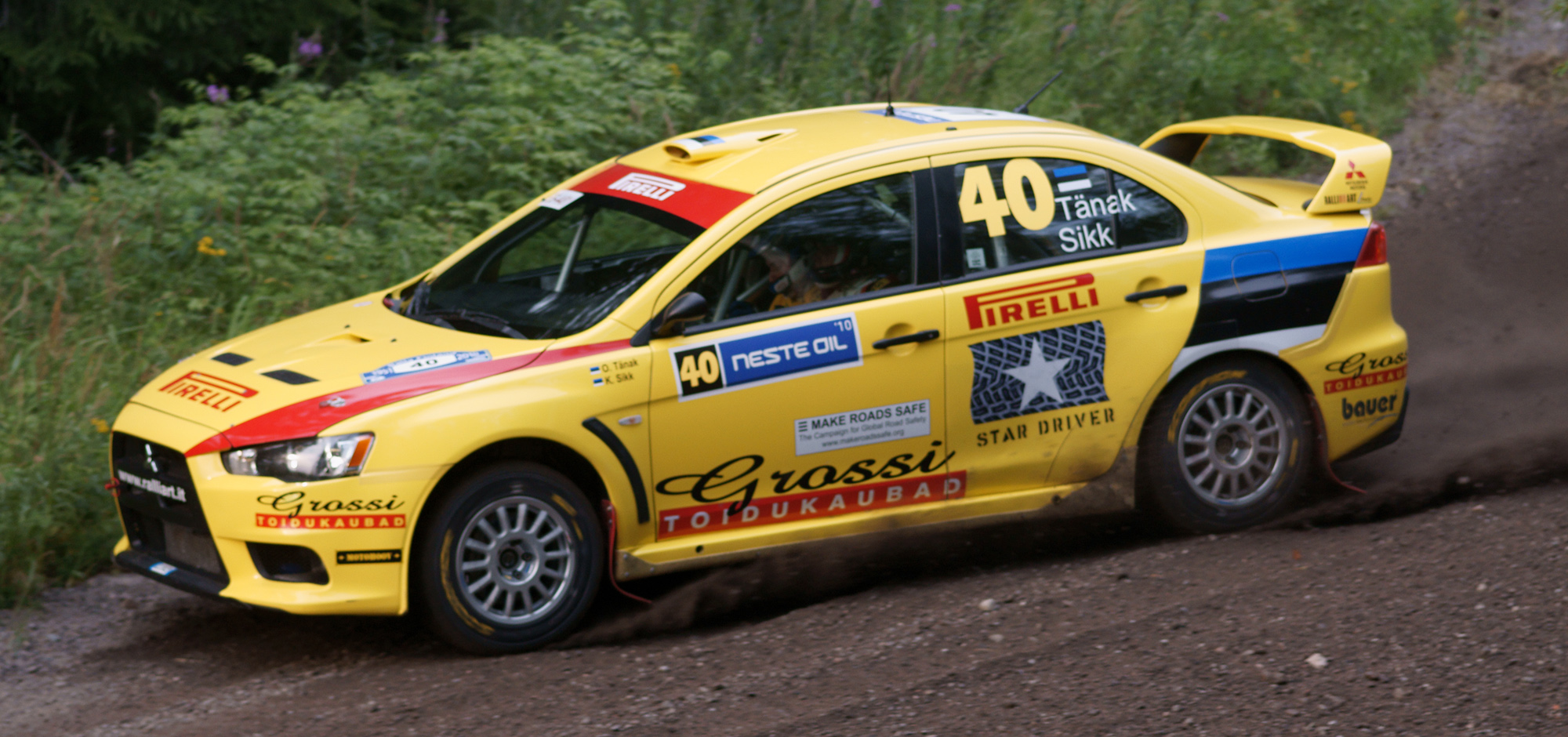
Ott Tänak driving one of the Pirelli Star Driver cars on the 2010 Rally Finland.

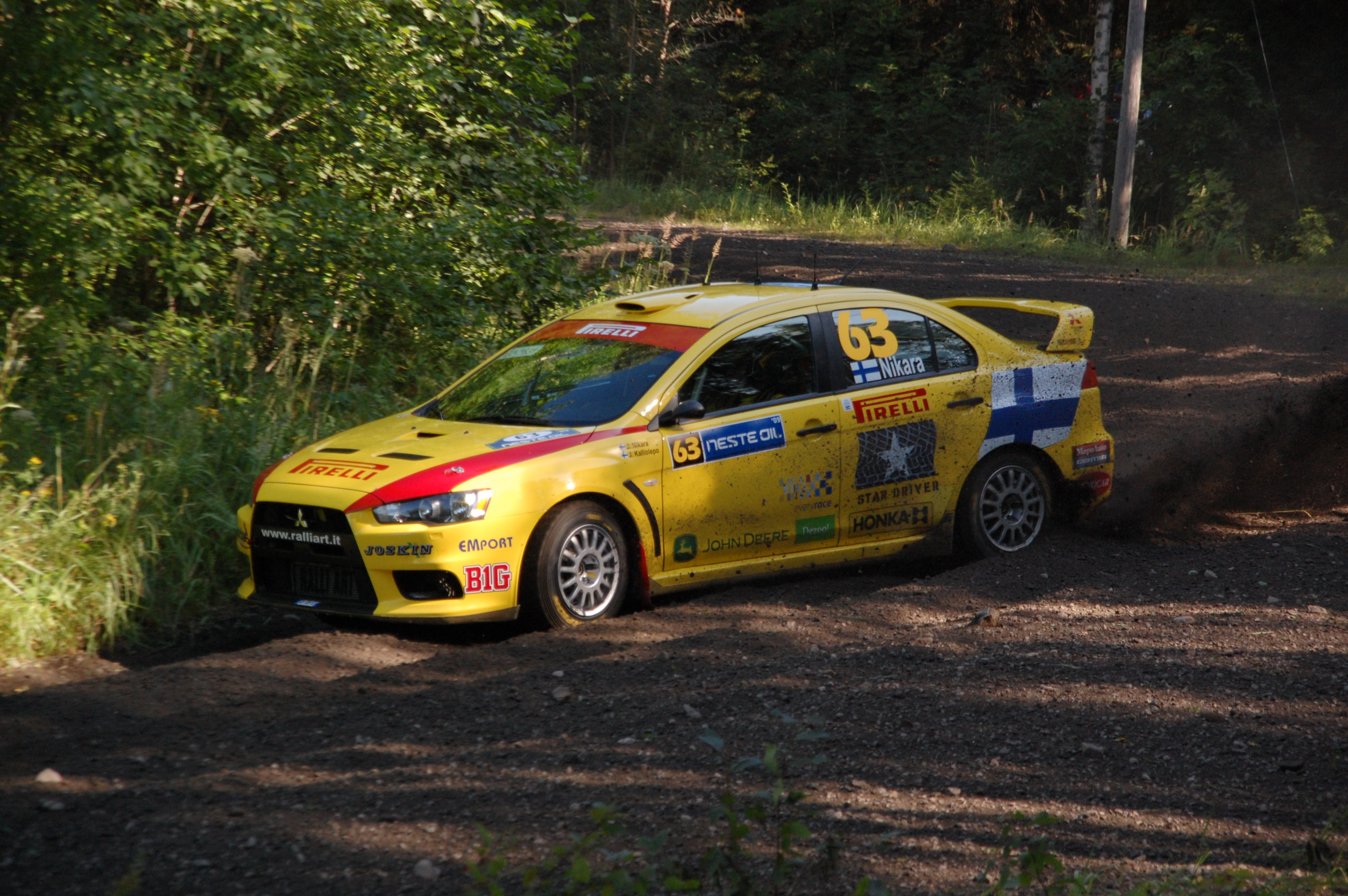
Jarkko Nikara driving at 2009 Rally Finland

Year	Drivers	Representing
2011	(Italy) Andrea Crugnola	Europe
2011	(Republic of Ireland) Craig Breen	Europe
2011	(Sweden) Fredrik Åhlin	Europe
2011	(Czech Republic) Jan Černý	Europe
2011	(Australia) Brendan Reeves	Asia-Pacific
2011	(Australia) Molly Taylor	Women & Motor Sport Commission
2010	(Estonia) Ott Tänak	Europe
2010	(San Marino) Alex Raschi	Europe
2010	(New Zealand) Hayden Paddon	Asia-Pacific
2010	(Kenya) Peter Horsey	Africa
2010	(Lebanon) Nicholai Georgiou	Middle East
2009	(Finland) Jarkko Nikara	Europe
2009	(Czech Republic) Martin Semerád	Europe
2009	(New Zealand) Mark Tapper	Asia-Pacific
2009	(Cyprus) Nicos Thomas	Middle East
2009	(South Africa) Jon Williams	Africa

== WRC results ==
Year	Driver	Car	1	2	3	4	5	6	7	8	9	10	11	12	13	WDC	Points
2009	(Finland) Jarkko Nikara	Mitsubishi Lancer Evo X	IRE	NOR	CYP	POR; 41	ARG	ITA; 11	GRE; Ret	POL	FIN; Ret	AUS	ESP; 17	GBR; 35		-	0
2009	(Czech Republic) Martin Semerád	Mitsubishi Lancer Evo X	IRE	NOR	CYP	POR; 38	ARG	ITA; Ret	GRE; Ret	POL	FIN; Ret	AUS	ESP; Ret	GBR; 14		-	0
2009	(New Zealand) Mark Tapper	Mitsubishi Lancer Evo X	IRE	NOR	CYP	POR; 28	ARG	ITA; Ret	GRE; 20	POL	FIN; Ret	AUS	ESP; Ret	GBR; 17		-	0
2009	(Cyprus) Nicos Thomas	Mitsubishi Lancer Evo X	IRE	NOR	CYP	POR; Ret	ARG	ITA; Ret	GRE; Ret	POL	FIN; Ret	AUS	ESP; Ret	GBR; 23		-	0
2009	(South Africa) Jon Williams	Mitsubishi Lancer Evo X	IRE	NOR	CYP	POR; 23	ARG	ITA; 28	GRE; 18	POL	FIN; 21	AUS	ESP; 44	GBR; 28		-	0
2010	(Estonia) Ott Tänak	Mitsubishi Lancer Evo X	SWE	MEX	JOR	TUR; Ret	NZL	POR; Ret	BUL	FIN; 18	GER; 31	JPN	FRA; 19	ESP	GBR; 17	0	-
2010	(San Marino) Alex Raschi	Mitsubishi Lancer Evo X	SWE	MEX	JOR	TUR; 27	NZL	POR; 30	BUL	FIN; 28	GER; Ret	JPN	FRA; 26	ESP	GBR; 28	0	-
2010	(New Zealand) Hayden Paddon	Mitsubishi Lancer Evo X	SWE	MEX	JOR	TUR; 26	NZL	POR; 20	BUL	FIN; 21	GER; 19	JPN	FRA; 35	ESP	GBR; 19	0	-
2010	(Kenya) Peter Horsey	Mitsubishi Lancer Evo X	SWE	MEX	JOR	TUR; Ret	NZL	POR; 35	BUL	FIN; 40	GER; 45	JPN	FRA; Ret	ESP	GBR; 38	0	-
2010	(Lebanon) Nick Georgiou	Mitsubishi Lancer Evo X	SWE	MEX	JOR	TUR; 29	NZL	POR; 33	BUL	FIN; 41	GER; 43	JPN	FRA; 48	ESP	GBR; 33	0	-

=== WRC Academy Results ===
Year	Driver	Car	1	2	3	4	5	6	Pos.	Points
2011	(Italy) Andrea Crugnola	Ford Fiesta R2	POR; 7	ITA; 6	FIN; Ret	GER; 3	FRA; Ret	GBR; 8	6th	35
2011	(Republic of Ireland) Craig Breen	Ford Fiesta R2	POR; Ret	ITA; 8	FIN; 2	GER; 1	FRA; Ret	GBR; 1	1st	111
2011	(Sweden) Fredrik Åhlin	Ford Fiesta R2	POR; Ret	ITA; 3	FIN; Ret	GER; 6	FRA; 8	GBR; 13	6th	35
2011	(Czech Republic) Jan Černý	Ford Fiesta R2	POR; Ret	ITA; 4	FIN; 5	GER; 5	FRA; Ret	GBR; Ret	7th	33
2011	(Australia) Brendan Reeves	Ford Fiesta R2	POR; 3	ITA; 5	FIN; 4	GER; 13	FRA; Ret	GBR; 14	5th	37
2011	(Australia) Molly Taylor	Ford Fiesta R2	POR; 8	ITA; Ret	FIN; 8	GER; 14	FRA; 5	GBR; 5	11th	27

== See also ==
- Drive DMACK Fiesta Trophy
- FIA Rally Star
