= Semerad =

Semerád is a Czech surname. Notable people with the surname include:

- Australian-born Filipino-Czech twin basketball players (born 1991)
  - Anthony Semerad, player for the TNT KaTropa
  - David Semerad, player for the San Miguel Beermen
- Martin Semerád (born 1990), Czech rally driver
