= WordDive =

AI-based language learning software

- Website type: Online language learning
- Available in: English, German, Swedish, Finnish
- Website: www.worddive.com
- Commercial: Yes
- Launched: 2010
- Current status: Online

WordDive is an online language learning software and mobile application. Ten languages are currently offered: English, Estonian, Finnish, French, German, Italian, Japanese, Russian, Spanish and Swedish.

== Concept ==
The method is based on the use of multiple senses, individual optimization and game-like elements. With the individual optimization feature, the course is modified based on the user's learning ability.

== Recognition and awards ==
WordDive has been awarded as the Best e-Learning Solution in Finland, 2011, as well as the Best Mobile Service in Finland, 2014. In spring 2015, WordDive was selected as a Red Herring Europe Top 100 winner. In November 2018 WordDive was certified for pedagogical quality by Education Alliance Finland, a teacher-led certification agency specialized in quality verification of educational solutions.

== Development ==
The company is based in Tampere, Finland. The service was launched in 2010. In 2020, the platform had 850,000 users in 150 countries.

In Finland and Germany WordDive is best known for its English prep course.

In Germany, the company is working together with brand ambassador Samu Haber, the frontman of the band Sunrise Avenue and a judge in The Voice of Germany.

In January 2017, WordDive secured 1.2 million euros via the Invesdor crowdfunding platform, and in April 2018 1.5 million euros in Privanet.
