= Bohuslav Ceplecha =

Czech rally co-driver (1977–2012)

- Born: Bohuslav Ceplecha; 6 May 1977
- Died: 14 July 2012 (aged 35)
- Occupation: Rally co-driver

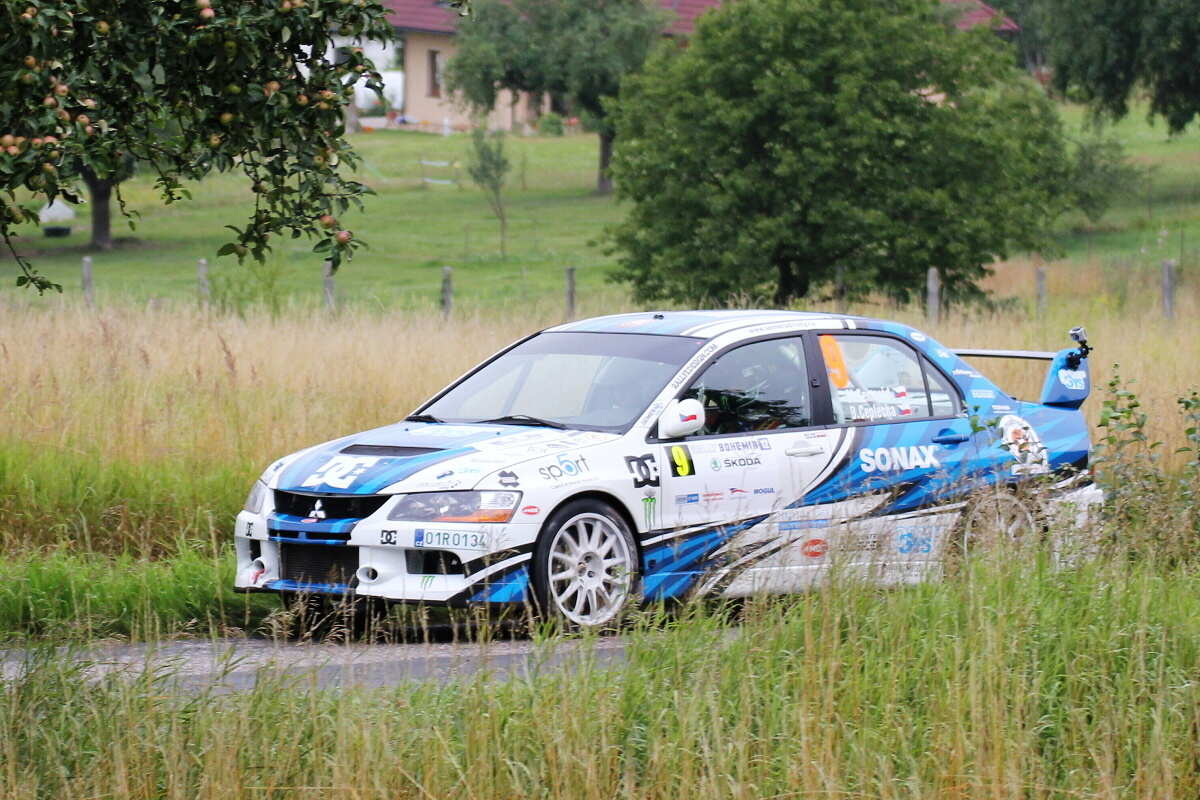
Semerád/Ceplecha (Rally Bohemia 2012 shakedown)

Bohuslav Ceplecha (Czech pronunciation: [ˈboɦuslaf ˈtsɛplɛxa]; 6 May 1977 – 14 July 2012) was a rally co-driver. He died on 14 July 2012 after a serious accident at Rally Bohemia in the Czech Republic.

== Death ==
He died in a crash in the third stage when driver Martin Semerád lost control of his Lancer and a hit a tree at high speed. Rescue units reached the scene but despite the efforts, Ceplecha's injuries were too severe and he succumbed on the spot. The 22-year-old Semerád, who was taken to a hospital by a helicopter, survived with a minor injury suffering with a clavicle fracture. The 39th edition of the rally was cancelled after the accident.
