= 2010 Rally Sweden =

58. Swedish Rally

58th Uddeholm Swedish Rally 58th Rally Sweden
Round 1 of the 2010 World Rally Championship
Next event →
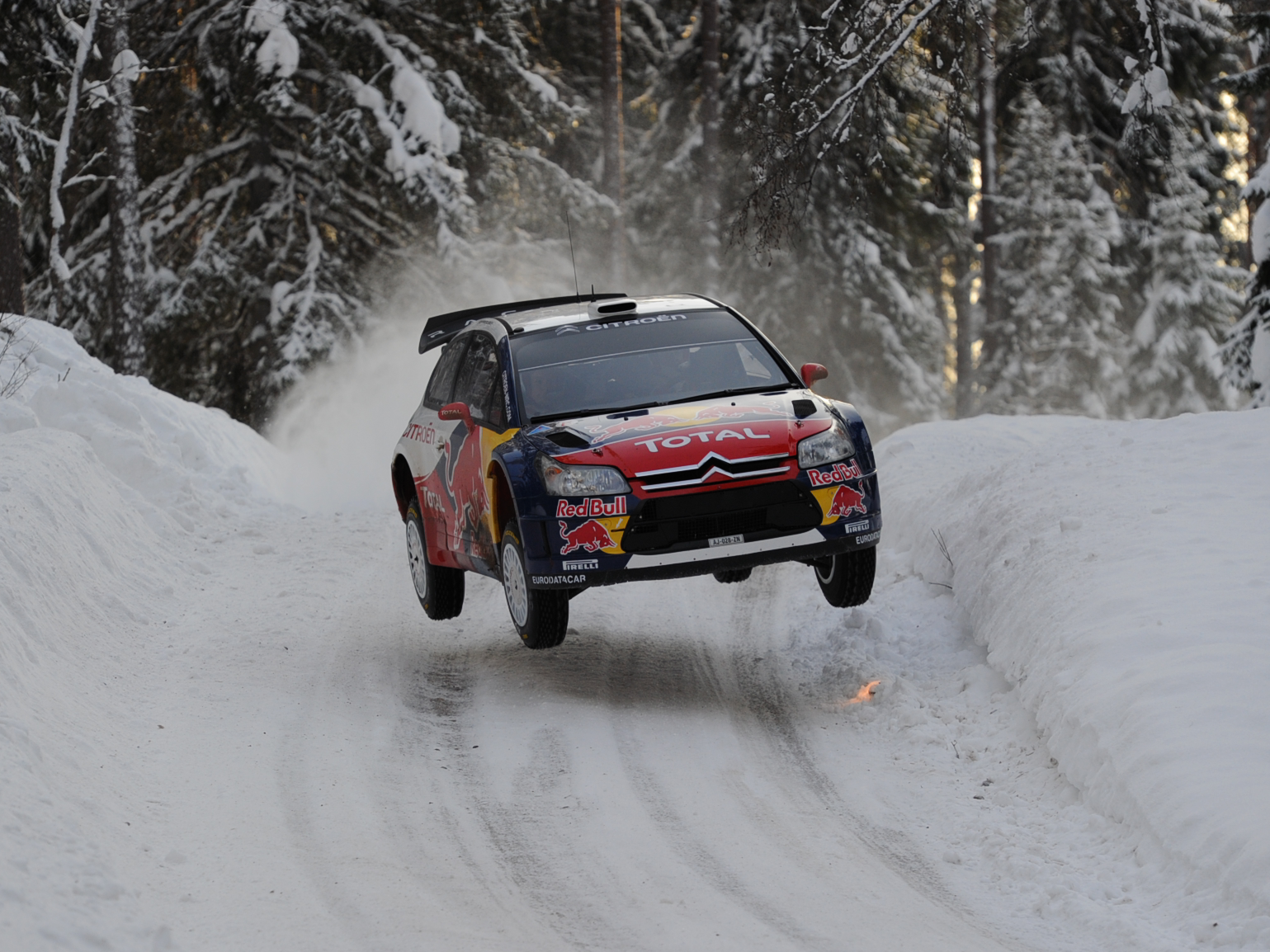
- Host country: Sweden
- Rally base: Karlstad, Sweden
- Dates run: February 11 – 14 2010
- Stages: 21 (345.15 km; 214.47 miles)
- Stage surface: Snow-/Ice-covered gravel
- Overall distance: 1,879.23 km (1,167.70 miles)

Statistics
- Crews: 55 at start, 43 at finish

Overall results
- Overall winner: (Finland) Mikko Hirvonen (United Kingdom) BP Ford Abu Dhabi WRT

The 2010 Rally Sweden was the opening round of the 2010 World Rally Championship season. It was the season's first and only event held on snow- and ice-covered gravel roads. The rally was held over February 11–14, beginning with a Super Special Stage in the event's base town of Karlstad. The rally was also the first round of both the Production Car World Rally Championship, and the brand-new Super 2000 World Rally Championship.

The rally was the first to incorporate the new points system introduced to all classes for the 2010 season. The system sees 25 points awarded for first, 18 for second, with third receiving 15, 12 for fourth and then ten, eight, six, four, two, and one for tenth place.

Mikko Hirvonen won the rally, taking the twelfth win of his career. Hirvonen took six stage wins over the course of the rally, leading overall from Stage 5 onwards. Reigning world champion Sébastien Loeb finished second, some 42 seconds behind the Finn, with Hirvonen's teammate Jari-Matti Latvala completing the podium in third place. Further back, Marcus Grönholm returned to a WRC event, but finished outside the points in 21st position. 2007 Formula One world champion Kimi Räikkönen made his second start in a WRC rally, and his first at the wheel of a contemporary World Rally Car. Räikkönen lost over half an hour to the leading drivers when his car got stuck in an area of soft snow, and was forced to dig himself out on day one. He never recovered the time lost and finished 29th overall.

In the inaugural SWRC event, Per-Gunnar Andersson held off the challenges of Janne Tuohino and Martin Prokop to win the rally. Prokop also earned an overall stage win, when he completed the second run through the Hagfors Sprint stage in the fastest time. In the PWRC, Patrik Flodin won by over a minute from Anders Grøndal, with Armindo Araújo over five minutes behind the Swede in third.

== Results ==
=== Event standings ===
Pos.	Driver	Co-driver	Car	Time	Difference	Points
Overall
1.	(Finland) Mikko Hirvonen	(Finland) Jarmo Lehtinen	Ford Focus RS WRC 09	3:09:30.4	0.0	25
2.	(France) Sébastien Loeb	(Monaco) Daniel Elena	Citroën C4 WRC	3:10:12.7	42.3	18
3.	(Finland) Jari-Matti Latvala	(Finland) Miikka Anttila	Ford Focus RS WRC 09	3:10:45.8	1:15.4	15
4.	(Spain) Dani Sordo	(Spain) Marc Martí	Citroën C4 WRC	3:12:12.0	2:41.6	12
5.	(France) Sébastien Ogier	(France) Julien Ingrassia	Citroën C4 WRC	3:13:45.7	4:15.3	10
6.	(Norway) Henning Solberg	(Austria) Ilka Minor	Ford Focus RS WRC 08	3:14:53.8	5:23.4	8
7.	(United Kingdom) Matthew Wilson	(United Kingdom) Scott Martin	Ford Focus RS WRC 08	3:17:24.3	7:53.9	6
8.	(Norway) Mads Østberg	(Sweden) Jonas Andersson	Subaru Impreza WRC 2007	3:18:52.6	9:22.2	4
9.	(Norway) Petter Solberg	(United Kingdom) Phil Mills	Citroën C4 WRC	3:19:47.9	10:17.5	2
10.	(Sweden) Per-Gunnar Andersson	(Sweden) Anders Fredriksson	Škoda Fabia S2000	3:21:39.3	12:08.9	1
SWRC
1. (10.)	(Sweden) Per-Gunnar Andersson	(Sweden) Anders Fredriksson	Škoda Fabia S2000	3:21:39.3	0.0	25
2. (12.)	(Finland) Janne Tuohino	(Finland) Markku Tuohino	Ford Fiesta S2000	3:22:36.6	57.3	18
3. (14.)	(Czech Republic) Martin Prokop	(Czech Republic) Jan Tománek	Ford Fiesta S2000	3:24:35.7	2:56.4	15
4. (15.)	(Sweden) Patrik Sandell	(Sweden) Emil Axelsson	Škoda Fabia S2000	3:26:19.4	4:40.1	12
5. (16.)	(Norway) Eyvind Brynildsen	(Norway) Cato Menkerud	Škoda Fabia S2000	3:26:37.3	4:58.0	10
6. (19.)	(Portugal) Bernardo Sousa	(Portugal) Nuno Rodrigues da Silva	Ford Fiesta S2000	3:28:54.9	7:15.6	8
7. (25.)	(Sweden) Per-Arne Sääv	(Sweden) Karl-Olof Lexe	Škoda Fabia S2000	3:39:28.7	17:49.4	6
PWRC
1. (18.)	(Sweden) Patrik Flodin	(Sweden) Göran Bergsten	Subaru Impreza WRX STi	3:28:04.7	0.0	25
2. (20.)	(Norway) Anders Grøndal	(Norway) Veronica Engan	Subaru Impreza WRX STi	3:29:17.8	1:13.1	18
3. (23.)	(Portugal) Armindo Araújo	(Portugal) Miguel Ramalho	Mitsubishi Lancer Evolution X	3:33:09.6	5:04.9	15
4. (27.)	(Italy) Fabio Friseiro	(Spain) Jordi Barrabes Costa	Mitsubishi Lancer Evolution IX	3:44:49.8	16:45.1	12
5. (30.)	(Czech Republic) Martin Semerád	(Czech Republic) Bohuslav Ceplecha	Mitsubishi Lancer Evolution IX	3:49:52.5	21:47.8	10
6. (31.)	(Finland) Reijo Muhonen	(Finland) Lasse Miettinen	Mitsubishi Lancer Evolution X	3:53:00.0	24:55.3	8
7. (40.)	(Italy) Gianluca Linari	(Italy) Paolo Gregoriani	Subaru Impreza WRX STi	4:11:03.3	42:58.6	6
8. (42.)	(Brazil) Paulo Nobre	(Brazil) Edu Paula	Mitsubishi Lancer Evolution X	4:19:52.8	51:48.1	4

=== Special stages ===
All dates and times are CET (UTC+1).

Day	Stage	Time	Name	Length	Winner	Time	Avg. spd.	Rally leader
1 (11 Feb)	SS1	20:00	Karlstad Super Special Stage 1	1.90 km	(Spain) Dani Sordo	1:31.4	74.84 km/h	(Spain) Dani Sordo
2 (12 Feb)	SS2	08:18	Likenäs 1	20.78 km	(France) Sébastien Loeb	11:33.7	107.84 km/h	(France) Sébastien Loeb
2 (12 Feb)	SS3	09:41	Viggen 1	21.28 km	(France) Sébastien Loeb	10:50.7	117.73 km/h	(France) Sébastien Loeb
2 (12 Feb)	SS4	10:51	Torntorp 1	19.21 km	(Finland) Mikko Hirvonen	9:54.7	116.29 km/h	(France) Sébastien Loeb
2 (12 Feb)	SS5	13:33	Likenäs 2	20.78 km	(Finland) Mikko Hirvonen	11:37.7	107.22 km/h	(Finland) Mikko Hirvonen
2 (12 Feb)	SS6	14:56	Viggen 2	21.28 km	(Finland) Jari-Matti Latvala	10:49.5	117.95 km/h	(Finland) Mikko Hirvonen
2 (12 Feb)	SS7	16:29	Torntorp 2	19.21 km	(Finland) Mikko Hirvonen	9:57.0	115.84 km/h	(Finland) Mikko Hirvonen
2 (12 Feb)	SS8	20:00	Karlstad Super Special Stage 2	1.90 km	(France) Sébastien Loeb	1:34.8	72.15 km/h	(Finland) Mikko Hirvonen
3 (13 Feb)	SS9	07:58	Vargåsen 1	24.63 km	(Finland) Mikko Hirvonen	13:18.4	111.06 km/h	(Finland) Mikko Hirvonen
3 (13 Feb)	SS10	09:46	Sågen 1	14.23 km	(France) Sébastien Loeb	7:13.1	118.28 km/h	(Finland) Mikko Hirvonen
3 (13 Feb)	SS11	10:42	Fredriksberg 1	18.15 km	(France) Sébastien Loeb	10:27.4	104.14 km/h	(Finland) Mikko Hirvonen
3 (13 Feb)	SS12	11:58	Hagfors Sprint 1	1.87 km	(France) Sébastien Loeb	2:05.1	53.81 km/h	(Finland) Mikko Hirvonen
3 (13 Feb)	SS13	13:41	Vargåsen 2	24.63 km	(Finland) Jari-Matti Latvala	13:06.4	112.75 km/h	(Finland) Mikko Hirvonen
3 (13 Feb)	SS14	15:34	Sågen 2	14.23 km	(Finland) Marcus Grönholm	7:14.5	117.90 km/h	(Finland) Mikko Hirvonen
3 (13 Feb)	SS15	16:30	Fredriksberg 2	18.15 km	(Finland) Jari-Matti Latvala	10:44.2	101.43 km/h	(Finland) Mikko Hirvonen
3 (13 Feb)	SS16	17:46	Hagfors Sprint 2	1.87 km	(Czech Republic) Martin Prokop	2:14.9	49.90 km/h	(Finland) Mikko Hirvonen
4 (14 Feb)	SS17	07:52	Rämmen 1	21.87 km	(France) Sébastien Loeb	11:11.3	117.28 km/h	(Finland) Mikko Hirvonen
4 (14 Feb)	SS18	08:28	Värmullsåsen 1	23.41 km	(Finland) Mikko Hirvonen	13:13.2	106.25 km/h	(Finland) Mikko Hirvonen
4 (14 Feb)	SS19	10:51	Lesjöfors	10.49 km	(Finland) Mikko Hirvonen	5:52.9	107.01 km/h	(Finland) Mikko Hirvonen
4 (14 Feb)	SS20	11:23	Rämmen 2	21.87 km	(Finland) Jari-Matti Latvala	10:59.6	119.36 km/h	(Finland) Mikko Hirvonen
4 (14 Feb)	SS21	12:52	Värmullsåsen 2	23.41 km	(Finland) Jari-Matti Latvala	13:19.1	105.46 km/h	(Finland) Mikko Hirvonen

=== Standings ===
==== Drivers' championship ====
Pos	Driver	SWE (Sweden)	MEX (Mexico)	JOR (Jordan)	TUR (Turkey)	NZL (New Zealand)	POR (Portugal)	BUL (Bulgaria)	FIN (Finland)	GER (Germany)	JPN (Japan)	FRA (France)	ESP (Spain)	GBR (United Kingdom)	Pts
1	(Finland) Mikko Hirvonen	1													25
2	(France) Sébastien Loeb	2													18
3	(Finland) Jari-Matti Latvala	3													15
4	(Spain) Dani Sordo	4													12
5	(France) Sébastien Ogier	5													10
6	(Norway) Henning Solberg	6													8
7	(United Kingdom) Matthew Wilson	7													6
8	(Norway) Mads Østberg	8													4
9	(Norway) Petter Solberg	9													2
10	(Sweden) Per-Gunnar Andersson	10													1
Pos	Driver	SWE (Sweden)	MEX (Mexico)	JOR (Jordan)	TUR (Turkey)	NZL (New Zealand)	POR (Portugal)	BUL (Bulgaria)	FIN (Finland)	GER (Germany)	JPN (Japan)	FRA (France)	ESP (Spain)	GBR (United Kingdom)	Pts

Key
Colour	Result
Gold	Winner
Silver	2nd place
Bronze	3rd place
Green	Points finish
Blue	Non-points finish
Blue	Non-classified finish (NC)
Purple	Did not finish (Ret)
Black	Excluded (EX)
Black	Disqualified (DSQ)
White	Did not start (DNS)
White	Cancelled (C)
Blank	Withdrew entry from the event (WD)

==== Manufacturers' championship ====
Pos	Manufacturer	SWE (Sweden)	MEX (Mexico)	JOR (Jordan)	TUR (Turkey)	NZL (New Zealand)	POR (Portugal)	BUL (Bulgaria)	FIN (Finland)	GER (Germany)	JPN (Japan)	FRA (France)	ESP (Spain)	GBR (United Kingdom)	Pts
1	(United States) BP Ford World Rally Team	40													40
2	(France) Citroën Total World Rally Team	30													30
3	(France) Citroën Junior Team	14													14
4	(United Kingdom) Stobart M-Sport Ford Rally Team	14													14
Pos	Manufacturer	SWE (Sweden)	MEX (Mexico)	JOR (Jordan)	TUR (Turkey)	NZL (New Zealand)	POR (Portugal)	BUL (Bulgaria)	FIN (Finland)	GER (Germany)	JPN (Japan)	FRA (France)	ESP (Spain)	GBR (United Kingdom)	Pts

==== SWRC Drivers' championship ====
Pos	Driver	SWE (Sweden)	MEX (Mexico)	JOR (Jordan)	NZL (New Zealand)	POR (Portugal)	FIN (Finland)	GER (Germany)	JPN (Japan)	FRA (France)	GBR (United Kingdom)	Pts
1	(Sweden) Per-Gunnar Andersson	1										25
2	(Finland) Janne Tuohino	2										18
3	(Czech Republic) Martin Prokop	3										15
4	(Sweden) Patrik Sandell	4										12
5	(Norway) Eyvind Brynildsen	5										10
6	(Portugal) Bernardo Sousa	6										8
7	(Sweden) Per-Arne Sääv	7										6
Pos	Driver	SWE (Sweden)	MEX (Mexico)	JOR (Jordan)	NZL (New Zealand)	POR (Portugal)	FIN (Finland)	GER (Germany)	JPN (Japan)	FRA (France)	GBR (United Kingdom)	Pts

Key
Colour	Result
Gold	Winner
Silver	2nd place
Bronze	3rd place
Green	Points finish
Blue	Non-points finish
Blue	Non-classified finish (NC)
Purple	Did not finish (Ret)
Black	Excluded (EX)
Black	Disqualified (DSQ)
White	Did not start (DNS)
White	Cancelled (C)
Blank	Withdrew entry from the event (WD)

==== WRC Cup for Super 2000 Teams championship ====
Pos	Team	SWE (Sweden)	MEX (Mexico)	JOR (Jordan)	NZL (New Zealand)	POR (Portugal)	FIN (Finland)	GER (Germany)	JPN (Japan)	FRA (France)	GBR (United Kingdom)	Pts
1	(Finland) Janpro	25										25
2	(Czech Republic) Czech Ford National Team	18										18
3	(Austria) Red Bull Rally Team	15										15
4	(Belgium) Rene Georges Rally Sport	12										12
Pos	Team	SWE (Sweden)	MEX (Mexico)	JOR (Jordan)	NZL (New Zealand)	POR (Portugal)	FIN (Finland)	GER (Germany)	JPN (Japan)	FRA (France)	GBR (United Kingdom)	Pts

==== PWRC Drivers' championship ====
Pos	Driver	SWE (Sweden)	MEX (Mexico)	JOR (Jordan)	NZL (New Zealand)	FIN (Finland)	GER (Germany)	JPN (Japan)	FRA (France)	GBR (United Kingdom)	Pts
1	(Sweden) Patrik Flodin	1									25
2	(Norway) Anders Gröndal	2									18
3	(Portugal) Armindo Araújo	3									15
4	(Italy) Fabio Frisiero	4									12
5	(Czech Republic) Martin Semerád	5									10
6	(Finland) Reijo Muhonen	6									8
7	(Italy) Gianluca Linari	7									6
8	(Brazil) Paulo Nobre	8									4
Pos	Driver	SWE (Sweden)	MEX (Mexico)	JOR (Jordan)	NZL (New Zealand)	FIN (Finland)	GER (Germany)	JPN (Japan)	FRA (France)	GBR (United Kingdom)	Pts

Key
Colour	Result
Gold	Winner
Silver	2nd place
Bronze	3rd place
Green	Points finish
Blue	Non-points finish
Blue	Non-classified finish (NC)
Purple	Did not finish (Ret)
Black	Excluded (EX)
Black	Disqualified (DSQ)
White	Did not start (DNS)
White	Cancelled (C)
Blank	Withdrew entry from the event (WD)
