= 2013 Rally Australia =

Motorist rally in Australia

2013 Rally Australia 22nd Coates Hire Rally Australia
Round 10 of 13 in the 2013 World Rally Championship
← Previous event	Next event →
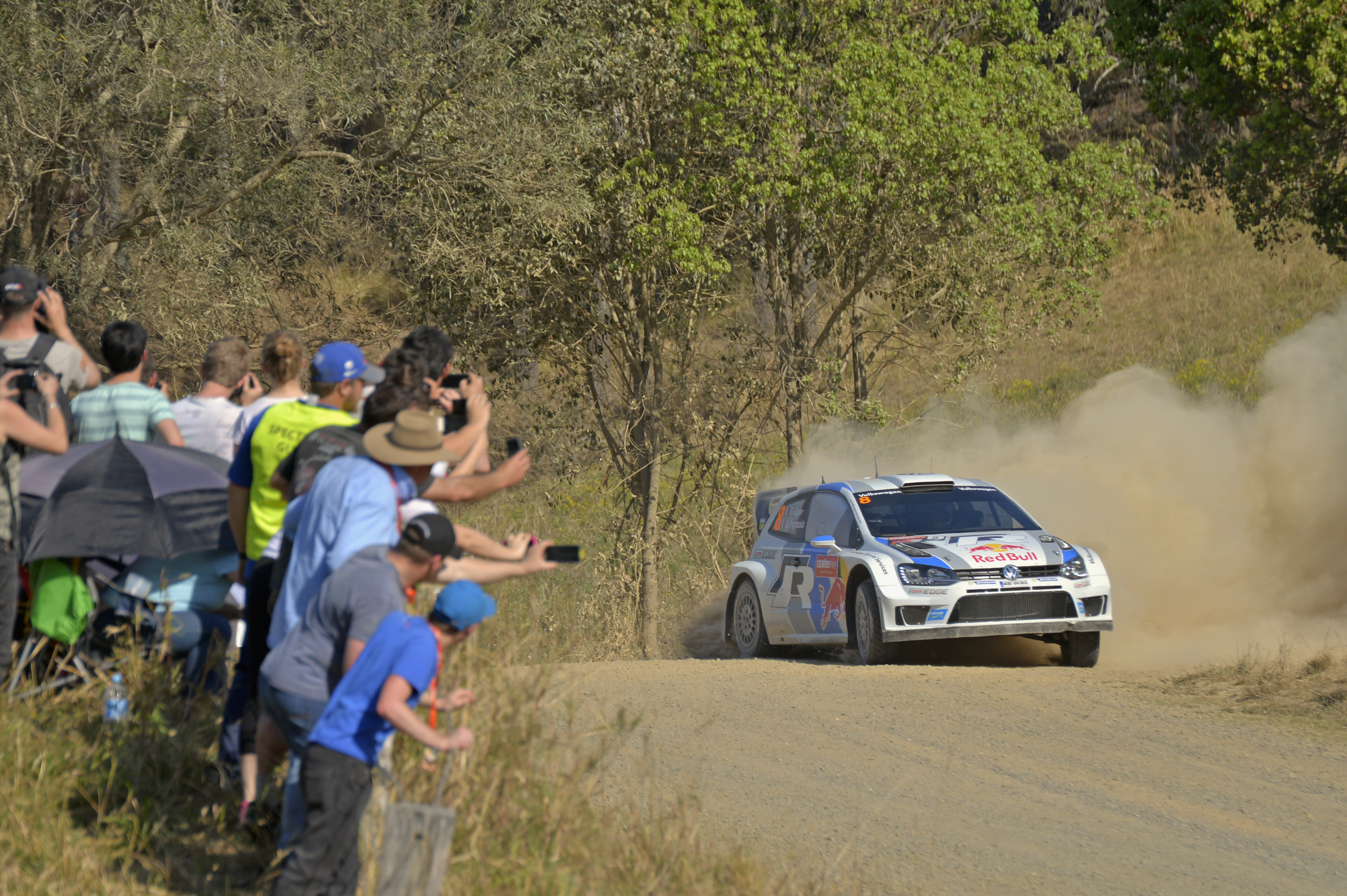
- Host country: Australia
- Rally base: Coffs Harbour
- Dates run: September 12 – 15, 2013
- Stages: 22 (352.36 km; 218.95 miles)
- Stage surface: Gravel

Statistics
- Crews: 29 at start, 23 at finish

Overall results
- Overall winner: (France) Sébastien Ogier (France) Julien Ingrassia (Germany) Volkswagen Motorsport; 3:19:55.0
- Power Stage winner: (France) Sébastien Ogier (France) Julien Ingrassia (Germany) Volkswagen Motorsport

The 22nd Coates Hire Rally Australia was the tenth rally of the 2013 World Rally Championship, held from 12 to 15 September, 2013. Sébastien Ogier won his sixth rally of the season.

== Results ==
=== Event standings ===
Pos.	No.	Driver	Co-driver	Team	Car	Class	Time	Difference	Points
Overall classification
1	8	(France) Sébastien Ogier	(France) Julien Ingrassia	(Germany) Volkswagen Motorsport	Volkswagen Polo R WRC	WRC	3:19:55.0	0.0	28
2	11	(Belgium) Thierry Neuville	(Belgium) Nicolas Gilsoul	(United Kingdom) Qatar World Rally Team	Ford Fiesta RS WRC	WRC	3:21:27.1	+1:32.1	20
3	2	(Finland) Mikko Hirvonen	(Finland) Jarmo Lehtinen	(France) Citroën Total Abu Dhabi WRT	Citroën DS3 WRC	WRC	3:21:57.1	+2:02.1	15
4	7	(Finland) Jari-Matti Latvala	(Finland) Miikka Anttila	(Germany) Volkswagen Motorsport	Volkswagen Polo R WRC	WRC	3:22:52.4	+2:57.4	12
5	4	(Norway) Mads Østberg	(Sweden) Jonas Andersson	(United Kingdom) Qatar M-Sport World Rally Team	Ford Fiesta RS WRC	WRC	3:23:12.2	+3:17.2	10
6	9	(Norway) Andreas Mikkelsen	(Republic of Ireland) Paul Nagle	(Germany) Volkswagen Motorsport II	Volkswagen Polo R WRC	WRC	3:23:32.6	+3:37.6	8
7	5	(Russia) Evgeny Novikov	(Austria) Ilka Minor	(United Kingdom) Qatar M-Sport World Rally Team	Ford Fiesta RS WRC	WRC	3:27:26.2	+7:31.2	7
8	22	(Australia) Nathan Quinn	(Australia) Glenn MacNeall	(Italy) Motorsport Italia	Mini John Cooper Works WRC	WRC	3:33:05.2	+13:10.2	4
9	10	(United Arab Emirates) Khalid Al Qassimi	(United Kingdom) Scott Martin	(France) Abu Dhabi Citroën Total WRT	Citroën DS3 WRC	WRC	3:35:12.6	+15:17.6	2
10	48	(Qatar) Abdulaziz Al-Kuwari	(Republic of Ireland) Killian Duffy	Seashore Qatar Rally Team	Ford Fiesta RRC	WRC-2	3:37:22.7	+17:27.7	1
WRC-2 standings
1 (10.)	48	(Qatar) Abdulaziz Al-Kuwari	(Republic of Ireland) Killian Duffy	Seashore Qatar Rally Team	Ford Fiesta RRC	WRC-2	3:37:22.7	0.0	25
2 (11.)	82	(Ukraine) Yuriy Protasov	(Estonia) Kuldar Sikk	(Estonia) MM Motorsport	Ford Fiesta R5	WRC-2	3:38:36.1	+1:13.4	18
3 (12.)	35	(Saudi Arabia) Yazeed Al-Rajhi	(United Kingdom) Michael Orr	(Saudi Arabia) Yazeed Racing	Ford Fiesta RRC	WRC-2	3:44:23.7	+7:01.0	15
4 (13.)	40	(Kazakhstan) Arman Smailov	(Russia) Andrey Rusov	(Finland) Tommi Mäkinen Racing	Subaru Impreza WRX STi	WRC-2	4:04:59.4	+27:36.7	12
5 (16.)	84	(New Zealand) Hayden Paddon	(New Zealand) John Kennard	(Austria) BRR Team	Škoda Fabia S2000	WRC-2	4:07:46.9	+30:24.2	10
6 (17.)	91	(Venezuela) Alejandro Lombardo	(Spain) Alex Haro	(Italy) Ralliart Italia	Mitsubishi Lancer Evo X	WRC-2	4:13:40.9	+36:18.2	8
7 (20.)	86	(Venezuela) Carlos Garcia Fessman	(Portugal) Hugo Magalhães	(Italy) Ralliart Italia	Mitsubishi Lancer Evo X	WRC-2	4:25:52.8	+48:30.1	6
8 (21.)	87	(Venezuela) Jose Alexander Gelvez	(Spain) Borja Rozanda	(Italy) Ralliart Italia	Mini John Cooper Works WRC	WRC-2	4:38:47.3	+1:01:24.6	4

=== Special Stages ===
Day	Stage	Name	Length	Winner	Car	Time	Rally Leader
Leg 1 (12-13 September)	SS1	Coffs 1	1.60 km	(Norway) Andreas Mikkelsen	Volkswagen Polo R WRC	1:22.1	(Norway) Andreas Mikkelsen
Leg 1 (12-13 September)	SS2	Coffs 2	1.60 km	(France) Sébastien Ogier	Volkswagen Polo R WRC	1:23.1	(Norway) Andreas Mikkelsen
Leg 1 (12-13 September)	SS3	Tuckers Nob 1	8.44 km	(France) Sébastien Ogier	Volkswagen Polo R WRC	5:27.9	(France) Sébastien Ogier
Leg 1 (12-13 September)	SS4	Bellingen 1	10.72 km	(France) Sébastien Ogier	Volkswagen Polo R WRC	6:26.1	(France) Sébastien Ogier
Leg 1 (12-13 September)	SS5	Newry 1	24.91 km	(France) Sébastien Ogier	Volkswagen Polo R WRC	15:10.1	(France) Sébastien Ogier
Leg 1 (12-13 September)	SS6	Tuckers Nob 2	8.44 km	(France) Sébastien Ogier	Volkswagen Polo R WRC	5:20.8	(France) Sébastien Ogier
Leg 1 (12-13 September)	SS7	Bellingen 2	10.72 km	(France) Sébastien Ogier	Volkswagen Polo R WRC	6:15.4	(France) Sébastien Ogier
Leg 1 (12-13 September)	SS8	Newry 2	24.91 km	(France) Sébastien Ogier	Volkswagen Polo R WRC	14:38.8	(France) Sébastien Ogier
Leg 1 (12-13 September)	SS9	Coffs 3	1.60 km	(France) Sébastien Ogier	Volkswagen Polo R WRC	1:20.8	(France) Sébastien Ogier
Leg 1 (12-13 September)	SS10	Coffs 4	1.60 km	(Finland) Jari-Matti Latvala	Volkswagen Polo R WRC	1:19.8	(France) Sébastien Ogier
Leg 2 (14 September)	SS11	Nambucca 1	49.90 km	(France) Sébastien Ogier	Volkswagen Polo R WRC	28:19.7	(France) Sébastien Ogier
Leg 2 (14 September)	SS12	Valla 1	14.84 km	(France) Sébastien Ogier	Volkswagen Polo R WRC	8:47.3	(France) Sébastien Ogier
Leg 2 (14 September)	SS13	Nambucca 2	49.90 km	(France) Sébastien Ogier	Volkswagen Polo R WRC	27:41.3	(France) Sébastien Ogier
Leg 2 (14 September)	SS14	Valla 2	14.84 km	(France) Sébastien Ogier	Volkswagen Polo R WRC	8:34.3	(France) Sébastien Ogier
Leg 2 (14 September)	SS15	Coffs 5	1.60 km	(France) Sébastien Ogier	Volkswagen Polo R WRC	1:23.3	(France) Sébastien Ogier
Leg 2 (14 September)	SS16	Coffs 6	1.60 km	(France) Sébastien Ogier	Volkswagen Polo R WRC	1:21.4	(France) Sébastien Ogier
Leg 3 (15 September)	SS17	Bucca 1	10.89 km	(Finland) Mikko Hirvonen	Citroën DS3 WRC	6:19.5	(France) Sébastien Ogier
Leg 3 (15 September)	SS18	Wedding Bells 1	22.24 km	(France) Sébastien Ogier	Volkswagen Polo R WRC	11:29.0	(France) Sébastien Ogier
Leg 3 (15 September)	SS19	Shipmans 1	29.44 km	(France) Sébastien Ogier	Volkswagen Polo R WRC	15:08.7	(France) Sébastien Ogier
Leg 3 (15 September)	SS20	Bucca 2	10.89 km	(France) Sébastien Ogier	Volkswagen Polo R WRC	6:07.7	(France) Sébastien Ogier
Leg 3 (15 September)	SS21	Wedding Bells 2	22.24 km	(France) Sébastien Ogier	Volkswagen Polo R WRC	11:11.2	(France) Sébastien Ogier
Leg 3 (15 September)	SS22	Shipmans 2	29.44 km	(France) Sébastien Ogier	Volkswagen Polo R WRC	14:44.9	(France) Sébastien Ogier

=== Power Stage ===
The "Power Stage" was a 29.44 km (18.29 mi) stage at the end of the rally.

Pos.	Driver	Car	Time	Diff.	Pts.
1	(France) Sébastien Ogier	Volkswagen Polo R WRC	14:44.9	0.0	3
2	(Belgium) Thierry Neuville	Ford Fiesta RS WRC	14:47.7	+2.8	2
3	(Russia) Evgeny Novikov	Ford Fiesta RS WRC	14:54.3	+9.4	1

=== Standings after rally ===
Drivers' Championship standings

Pos.	Driver	Points
1	(France) Sébastien Ogier	209
2	(Belgium) Thierry Neuville	129
3	(Finland) Jari-Matti Latvala	109
4	(Finland) Mikko Hirvonen	103
5	(Spain) Dani Sordo	96

Manufacturers' Championship standings

Pos.	Manufacturer	Points
1	(Germany) Volkswagen Motorsport	299
2	(France) Citroën Total Abu Dhabi WRT	251
3	(United Kingdom) Qatar M-Sport World Rally Team	142
4	(United Kingdom) Qatar World Rally Team	139
5	(Czech Republic) Jipocar Czech National Team	51

=== Other ===
WRC-2 Drivers' Championship standings

Pos.	Driver	Points
1	(Qatar) Abdulaziz Al-Kuwari	118
2	(Poland) Robert Kubica	101
3	(Ukraine) Yuriy Protasov	83
4	(Peru) Nicolás Fuchs	78
5	(Germany) Sepp Wiegand	67
