= Martin Semerád =

Czech rally driver (born 1990)

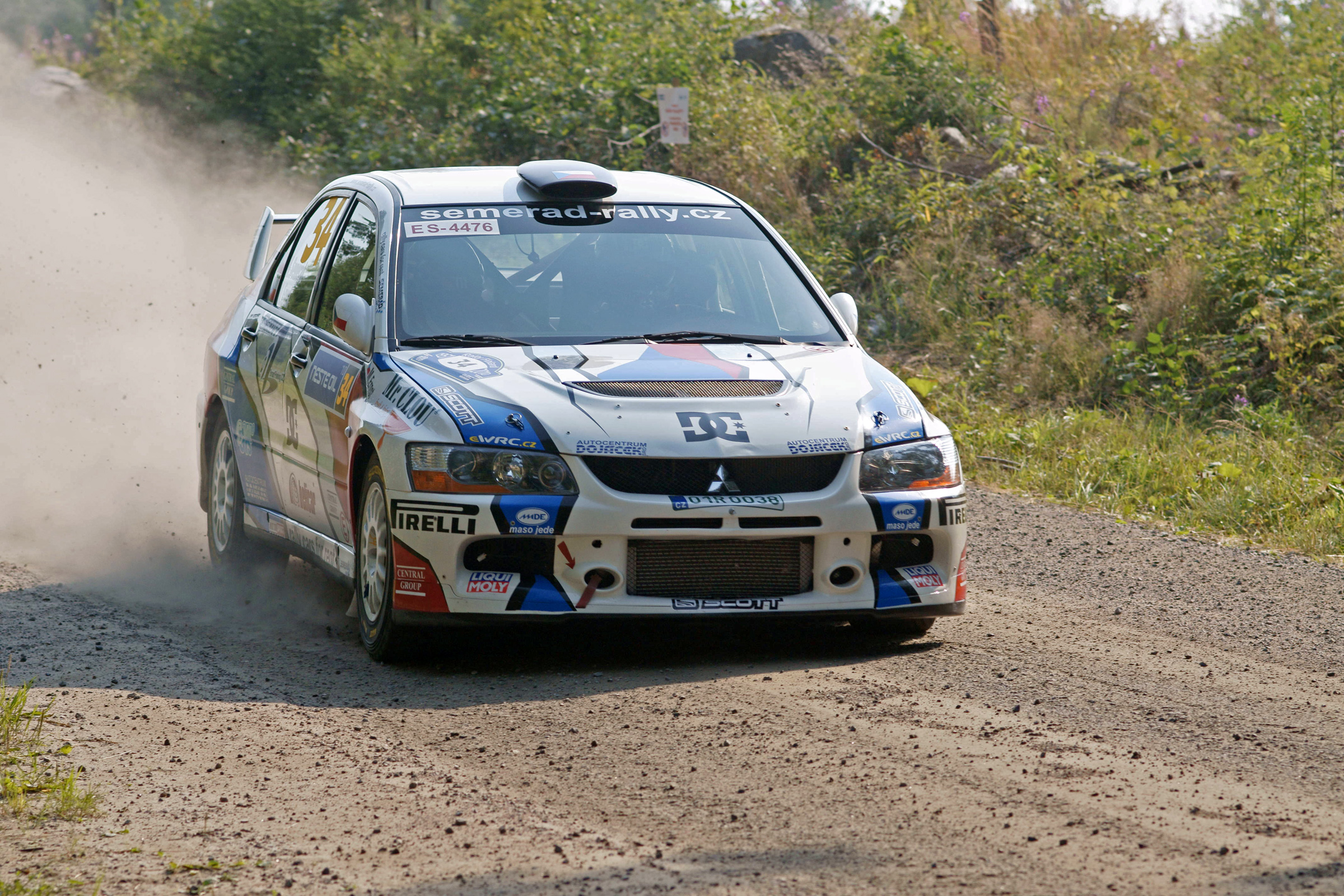
- Semerád at 2010 Rally Finland

Personal information
- Nationality: (Czech Republic) Czech
- Born: May 24, 1990 (age 36)

World Rally Championship record
- Years active: 2009–present
- Teams: Czech National Team, Pirelli Star Driver
- Rallies: 13
- Championships: 0
- Rally wins: 0
- Podiums: 0
- Stage wins: 0
- Total points: 0
- First rally: 2009 Rally Norway

Martin Semerád is a Czech former rally driver. He competed in the 18 World Rally Championship events between 2009 and 2011. He raced in the Production World Rally Championship and since the 2009 season. He was one of the Pirelli Star Drivers in 2009. He won PWRC at 2011 Rally Sweden and he held the record for youngest winner of PWRC rally.

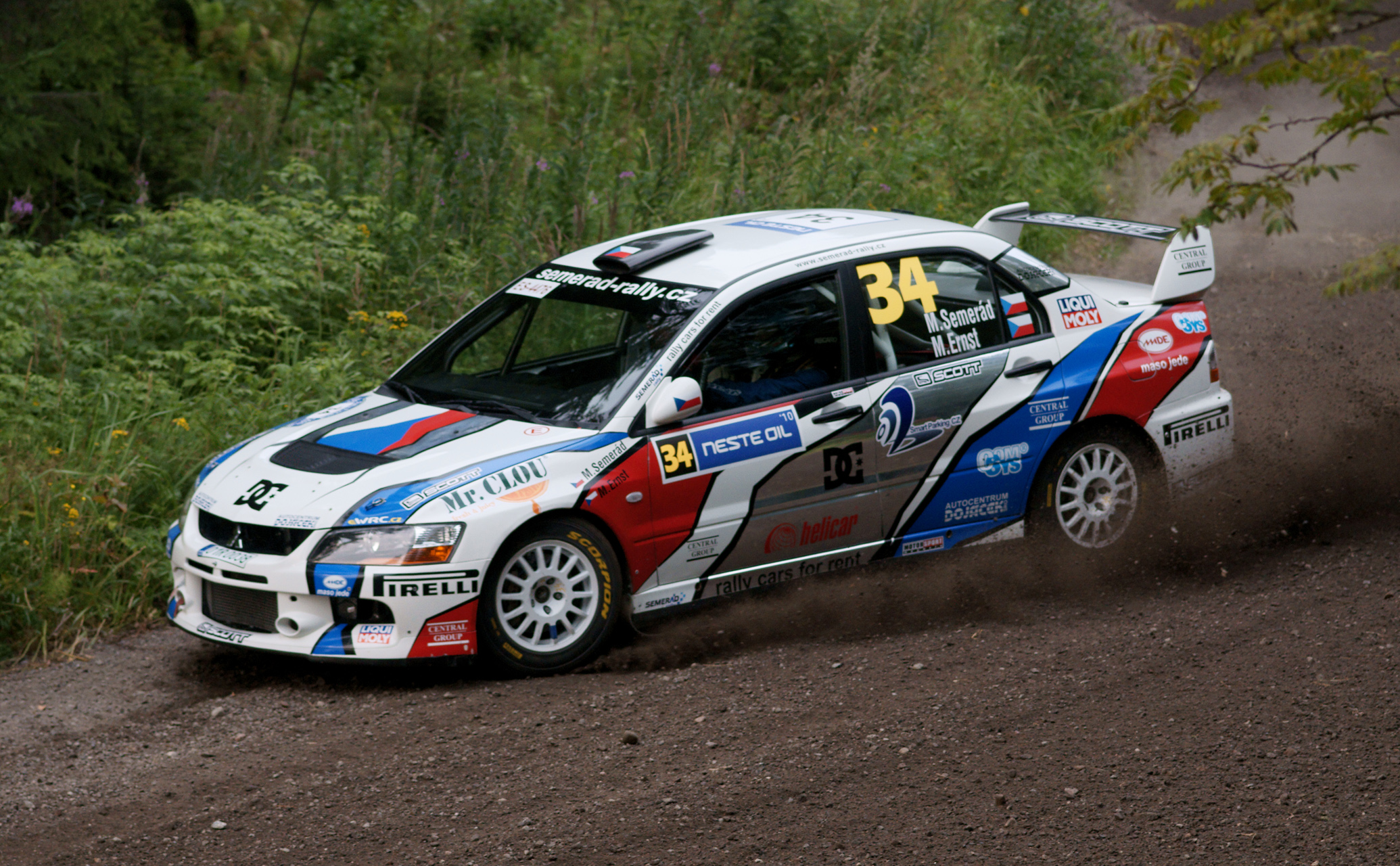
Martin Semerád at 2010 Rally Finland.

== WRC results ==
Year	Entrant	Car	1	2	3	4	5	6	7	8	9	10	11	12	13	WDC	Points
2009	Martin Semerád	Mitsubishi Lancer Evo IX	IRE	NOR; 33	CYP; Ret											NC	0
2009	Pirelli Star Driver	Mitsubishi Lancer Evo X				POR; 38	ARG	ITA; Ret	GRE; Ret	POL	FIN; Ret	AUS	ESP; Ret	GBR; 14		NC	0
2010	Czech National Team	Mitsubishi Lancer Evo IX	SWE; 30	MEX	JOR; Ret	TUR	NZL	POR	BUL	FIN; 30	GER	JPN	FRA	ESP	GBR; Ret	NC	0
2011	Martin Semerád	Mitsubishi Lancer Evo IX	SWE; 16	MEX	POR; 16	JOR	ITA		GRE	FIN; Ret	GER	AUS	FRA	ESP; 36	GBR; Ret	NC	0
2011	Martin Semerád	Mitsubishi Lancer Evo X						ARG; 14								NC	0

=== PWRC results ===
Year	Entrant	Car	1	2	3	4	5	6	7	8	9	PWRC	Points
2009	Martin Semerád	Mitsubishi Lancer Evo IX	NOR; 10	CYP; Ret								15th	7
2009	Pirelli Star Driver	Mitsubishi Lancer Evo X			POR; 8	ARG	ITA; Ret	GRE; Ret	AUS	GBR; 3		15th	7
2010	Czech National Team	Mitsubishi Lancer Evo IX	SWE; 5	MEX	JOR; Ret	NZL	FIN; 6	GER	JPN	FRA	GBR; Ret	15th	18
2011	Martin Semerád	Mitsubishi Lancer Evo IX	SWE; 1	POR; 3		AUS	FIN; Ret	ESP; 10	GBR; Ret			4th	51
2011	Martin Semerád	Mitsubishi Lancer Evo X			ARG; 5							4th	51

=== Czech Rally Championship results ===
Year	Entrant	Car	1	2	3	4	5	6	7	8	9	MMČR	Points
2008	Sherlog Racing	Mitsubishi Lancer Evo IX	JÄN	VAL	ŠUM	KRU	HUS	TŘE	BOH; Ret			-	0
2008	PK Oil Racing	Mitsubishi Lancer Evo IX								BAR; Ret	PŘÍ	-	0
2009	Sherlog Racing	Mitsubishi Lancer Evo IX	VAL<	ŠUM	KRU	HUS	BAR; Ret	PŘÍ	BOH			-	0
2011	Czech National Team	Mitsubishi Lancer Evo IX	VAL	ŠUM	KRU	HUS	BOH; Ret	BAR	PŘÍ			-	0
2012	Czech National Team	Mitsubishi Lancer Evo IX	JÄN; 5	VAL; 8	ŠUM; 4	KRU; 5	HUS; 8	BOH; Ret	BAR	PŘÍ		7th	66
2013	Semerád Rally Team	Mitsubishi Lancer Evo IX	JÄN; Ret	ŠUM	KRU	HUS	BOH	BAR	PŘÍ			-	0
