= Rallye de France Alsace =

- Status: inactive
- Genre: motorsporting event
- Frequency: annual
- Country: France
- Years active: 5
- Inaugurated: 2010
- Most recent: 2014
- Website: rallyedefrance.com

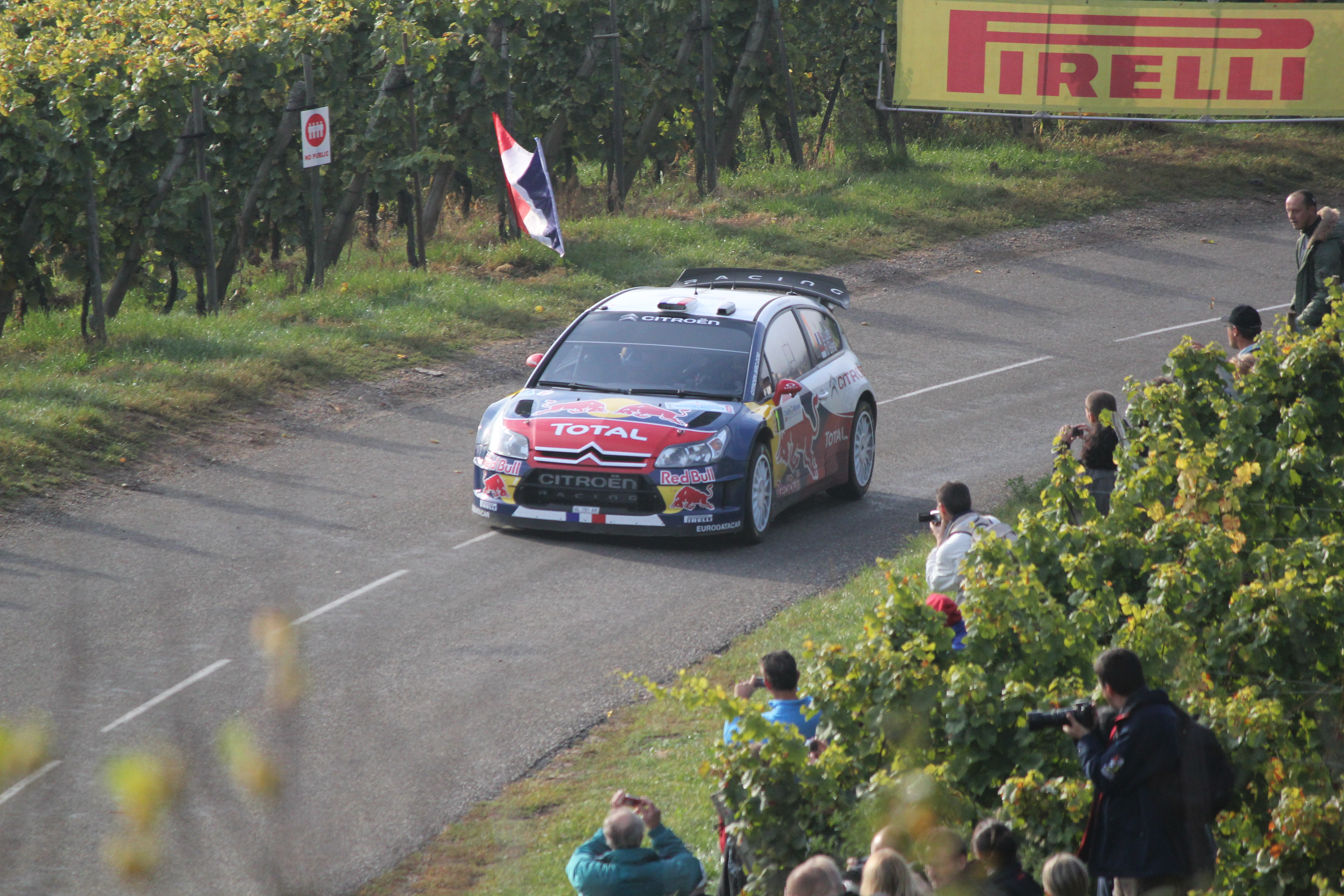
Sébastien Loeb at the 2010 event

The Rallye de France Alsace was a rally competition held in the Alsace region of France. The rally took place on roads in the Vosges mountains, as well as on similar vineyard tracks to Rallye Deutschland.

In 2010, it became the French round of the World Rally Championship, the Rallye de France, replacing the Tour de Corse rally in Corsica. After 5 editions, it was revealed in a meeting in January 2015 in Paris that the rally would no longer be part of the World Rally Championship due to local authorities in the Alsace region withdrawing support. The French round of the World Rally Championship returned to Tour de Corse in 2015.

== Winners ==
Season	Driver	Co-driver	Car	Event report
2010	(France) Sébastien Loeb	(Monaco) Daniel Elena	Citroën C4 WRC	Report
2011	(France) Sébastien Ogier	(France) Julien Ingrassia	Citroën DS3 WRC	Report
2012	(France) Sébastien Loeb	(Monaco) Daniel Elena	Citroën DS3 WRC	Report
2013	(France) Sébastien Ogier	(France) Julien Ingrassia	Volkswagen Polo R WRC	Report
2014	(Finland) Jari-Matti Latvala	(Finland) Miikka Anttila	Volkswagen Polo R WRC	Report
