= Sébastien Ogier =

French rally driver (born 1983)

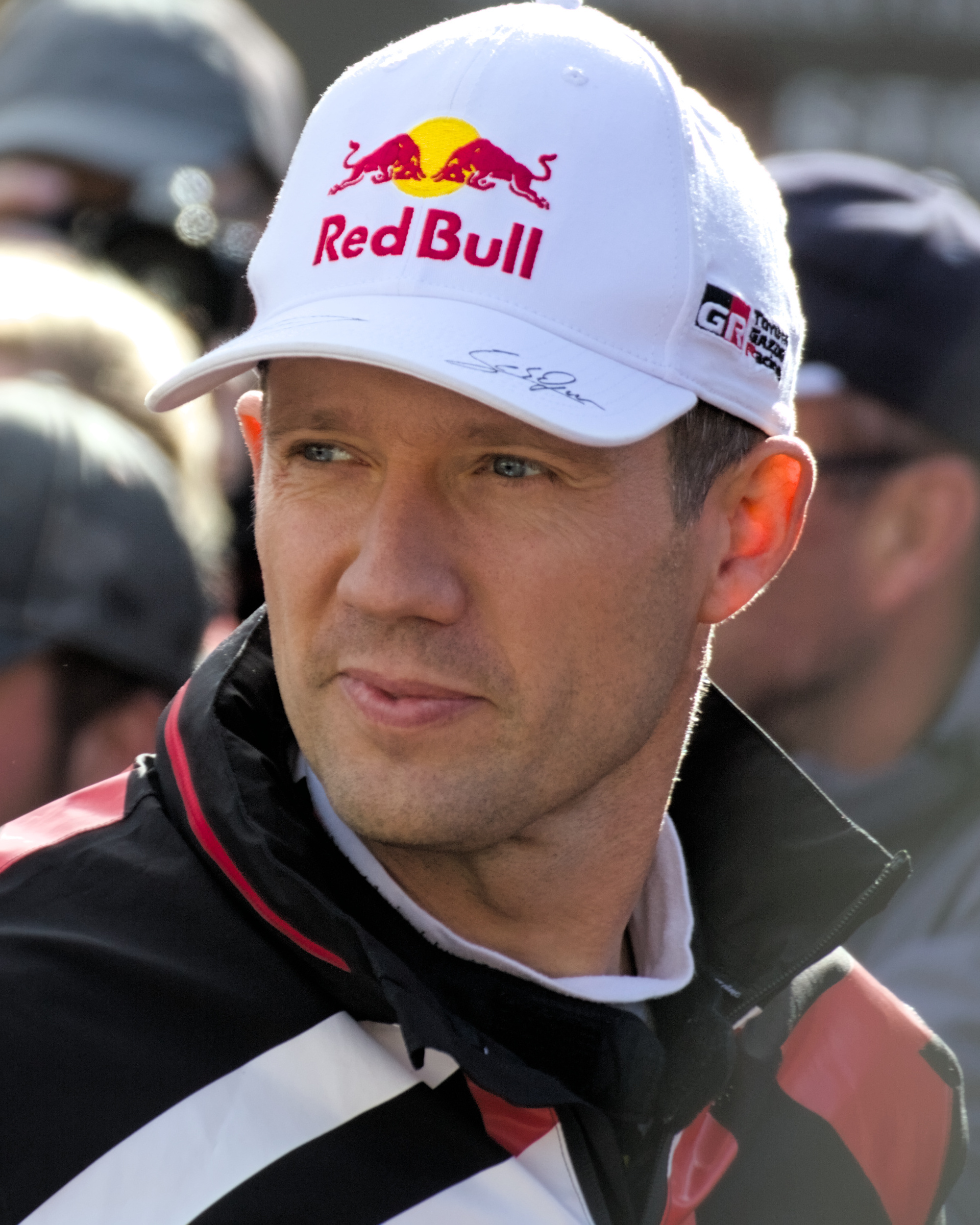
- Ogier at the 2023 Central European Rally

Personal information
- Nationality: French
- Full name: Sébastien Eugène Emile Ogier
- Born: 17 December 1983 (age 42); Gap, Hautes-Alpes, France

World Rally Championship record
- Years active: 2008–present
- Co-driver: (France) Julien Ingrassia (France) Benjamin Veillas (France) Vincent Landais
- Teams: Citroën Junior Team, Citroën, Volkswagen Motorsport, M-Sport Ford, Toyota Gazoo Racing
- Rallies: 214
- Championships: 9 (2013, 2014, 2015, 2016, 2017, 2018, 2020, 2021, 2025)
- Rally wins: 69
- Podiums: 121
- Stage wins: 858
- Total points: 3440
- First rally: 2008 Rally Mexico
- First win: 2010 Rally de Portugal
- Last win: 2026 Acropolis Rally
- Last rally: 2026 Rally Italia Sardegna
- Last updated on: 4 October 2026.

Sébastien Eugène Emile Ogier (French pronunciation: [sebastjɛ̃ ɔʒje]; born 17 December 1983) is a French rally driver, competing for the Toyota Gazoo Racing Team in the World Rally Championship (WRC). He was teamed with co-driver Vincent Landais. He has won nine World Rally Drivers' Championship including six consecutive titles from 2013 to 2018, in addition to 2020, 2021 and 2025, and is the joint most successful WRC driver together with Sébastien Loeb (nine titles each). He has achieved 69 rally victories and is one of the only two drivers (with Juha Kankkunen) to have won the World Championship with three different manufacturers. He holds various WRC records including the most drivers' championship points overall, biggest points gap with the championship runner-up, most stage victories and points in a single season.

Ogier started his rally career in France in 2005 and won the Peugeot 206 Cup in 2006. He won the title in his first season in the Junior World Rally Championship, driving a Citroën C2 in 2008. He debuted in the World Rally Championship at the 2008 Rally Mexico and scored a point in his first race after finishing eighth. He drove a World Rally Car for the first time, a Citroën C4 in 2008 Rally GB and was promoted to a full-time drive for the next season with the Citroën Junior Team. He got his first podium in the 2009 Acropolis Rally after securing a second-place finish. He drove select races for the Citroën World Rally Team in the 2010 season and took his maiden WRC win in the 2010 Rally de Portugal.

Ogier secured a full time drive with the Citroën factory team for the 2011 season. Ahead of the 2012 season, he joined the Volkswagen team and drove a Škoda Fabia S2000. He drove The Volkswagen Polo R WRC for the first time in the 2013 season, in which, he won his first WRC Drivers title with nine rally victories from 13 events. He won a further three consecutive titles in 2014, 2015, and 2016. He won a further two titles in the next two seasons, driving the Ford Fiesta WRC before finishing third in the lone season back with the Citroën team. He moved to Toyota Gazoo Racing WRT before the 2020 season and won the two titles in 2020, and 2021 season while driving a Toyota Yaris WRC. Since the 2022 season, he has been competing in select rallies with the Toyota team.

Ogier has also competed in the Intercontinental Rally Challenge, and Porsche Supercup. Apart from rallying, he tested a Red Bull Racing RB7 Formula one car in 2017. He also took part in the Race of Champions in 2011, and drove a Ferrari F430 Scuderia in the 2011 French GT Championship. He participated in three races in the 2022 FIA World Endurance Championship including the 24 Hours of Le Mans with the Richard Mille Racing Team.

== Rally career ==
=== Early years (2005–2007) ===
Ogier's rally career began in 2005 when he won the French Federation's Rallye Jeunes and was rewarded with a place in the Peugeot 206 Cup for the following season. Teamed with co-driver Julien Ingrassia, he claimed a podium at Terre des Cardabelles and sixth place in the championship along with the Best Rookie award.

In 2007, Ogier won the Peugeot 206 Cup with four victories (Diois, Langres, Causses, Touquet) and two second places (Alsace-Vosges, Limousin). He also won the Rallye Hivernal des Hautes-Alpes. In April 2007, he took part in his first regional rally (Rallye du Quercy) placing third overall in a Peugeot 206 XS.

Ogier received the Espoir Echappement de l’année award, an honorific prize from professionals and fans, joining past winners Didier Auriol, François Delecour and Sébastien Loeb.

=== World Championship (2008) ===
==== JWRC Champion ====
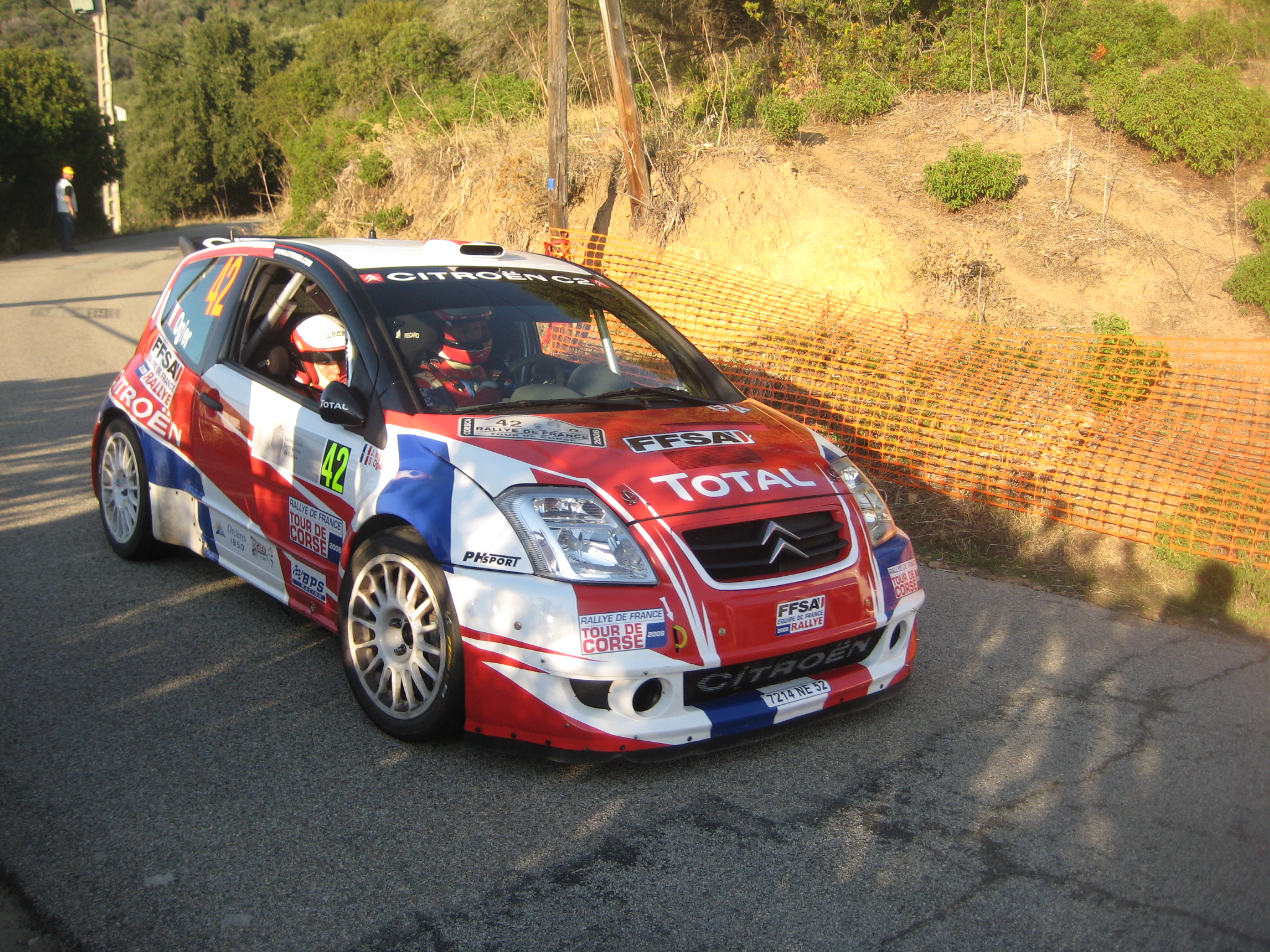
Ogier at the 2008 Tour de Corse

In the 2008 season, Ogier moved to compete a full Junior World Rally Championship program, driving a Super 1600-class Citroën C2 for the Equipe de France FFSA team.

Ogier debuted in the World Rally Championship at the 2008 Rally Mexico, winning first in the JWRC class, and becoming the first JWRC driver to take a WRC point thanks to his eighth place overall finish. He won again in Jordan: after a four-minute loss due to mechanical failure, he stormed back, eventually taking the victory when the leader went off the road.

After this second successive win, Ogier retired from Rally Sardinia with a broken steering rod. However, he restarted thanks to the SupeRally rule and finished fifth. Ogier went on to take further junior category victory in Germany. He then dominated his class at Rally Catalunya scoring most of the best times, but went off the road during the last leg.

After a cautious start at his home event, the Tour de Corse, Ogier clinched the Junior world champion title by placing second.

==== First WRC rally and first stage win ====
After winning the JWRC title, Ogier was rewarded with his first World Rally Car drive in a Citroën C4 for Rally GB. He surprised the more experienced drivers by winning the first stage on the ice and taking a shock lead for his first WRC rally. With the advantage of his road position, he kept the lead until the fifth stage, before losing time with a mechanical trouble. He eventually crashed out from eighth place on day two.

=== Citroën (2009–2011) ===
==== 2009: 1st full WRC season (1st podium) and win in Monte-Carlo (IRC) ====
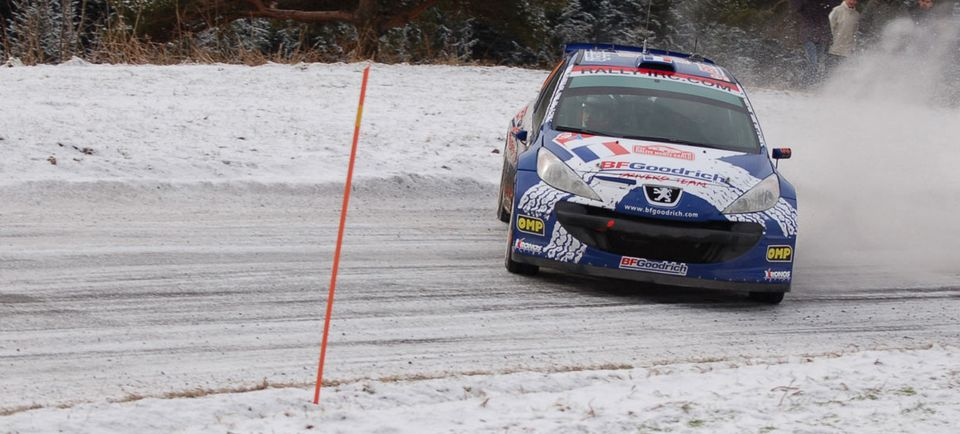
Ogier at the 2009 Monte Carlo Rally

In January 2009, Ogier made a one-off appearance in the Intercontinental Rally Challenge, contesting the Monte Carlo Rally. He won the prestigious event for his first rally in a Kronos Peugeot 207 S2000.

It was only a one-off participation in IRC: for the 2009 season, Ogier was signed in WRC to capitalize on his Junior title. At the start of the season, he was supposed to take part in the first six rounds of the world championship with a C4 WRC of Citroën's satellite team, and that the remaining rallies of the season would depend on his results. Despite a few mistakes, his performances pushed the squad to confirm him for the rest of the season.

At the Acropolis Rally, Ogier drove to his first podium place, finishing second to Ford's Mikko Hirvonen.

==== 2010: 2nd full WRC season (1st win) ====
In January 2010, Ogier took part again in the Rallye Monte-Carlo with a Peugeot 207 S2000. After losing two minutes going off-road at the start of the race (on snow put by some spectators), he then scored a lot of stage wins and came back 45 seconds off the leader Mikko Hirvonen, but eventually retired on the last day with an alternator problem.

As Monte-Carlo was still part of the IRC calendar, Ogier's 2010 season really started in Sweden with the first round of the WRC year. The Frenchman continued in the Citroën Junior Team with the 2007 Formula One world champion Kimi Räikkönen as his new teammate. He took fifth place in Sweden after a solid performance and clinched his second podium in Mexico after duelling against Petter Solberg until the last minute. In Jordan, he took an excellent start and was lying second in the standings after the first two legs, however team orders forced him to take several minutes of penalty at a time control. He still ended in sixth position. In Turkey, Sébastien led during eleven stages, before losing three minutes with a puncture in SS15, eventually finishing fourth. At the Rally New Zealand, he came even closer to his maiden win as he was leading before the final stage, but spun three corners before the finish and lost the win to Latvala by 2.4 seconds (third smallest gap in the history).

Ogier went on to take his debut WRC victory in the next event, the Rally de Portugal. Keeping the momentum from his performances in Turkey and New Zealand, he took 45 seconds from road-sweeper Sébastien Loeb on day one. Although Loeb came back, Ogier made no mistake and eventually beat him by eight seconds. He went on to win Rally della Lanterna in Italy, a guest appearance he made to gain experience on asphalt as he had always been more confident on gravel.

Given Ogier's solid results, his team spirit and Dani Sordo's disappointing performances, Citroën promoted Ogier to the factory team for the remaining three gravel rounds of the season. Subsequently, Sordo replaced Ogier in the manufacturer's junior team. It proved to be a judicious decision as Ogier took a solid second place in Finland, in front of Loeb, whereas he was fourth and third behind Sordo and Loeb on asphalt (in Bulgaria and Germany). He took his second WRC win in Japan after a thrilling duel against Petter Solberg and impressed by his capacity to quickly adapt himself to a rally he had never raced before.

Ogier was just 43 points behind teammate Sébastien Loeb with three events to go, therefore still having a chance for the title. However, in the last three rallies he would only score nine points, making him lose two positions to Jari Matti Latvala and Petter Solberg and finishing the season in fourth place.

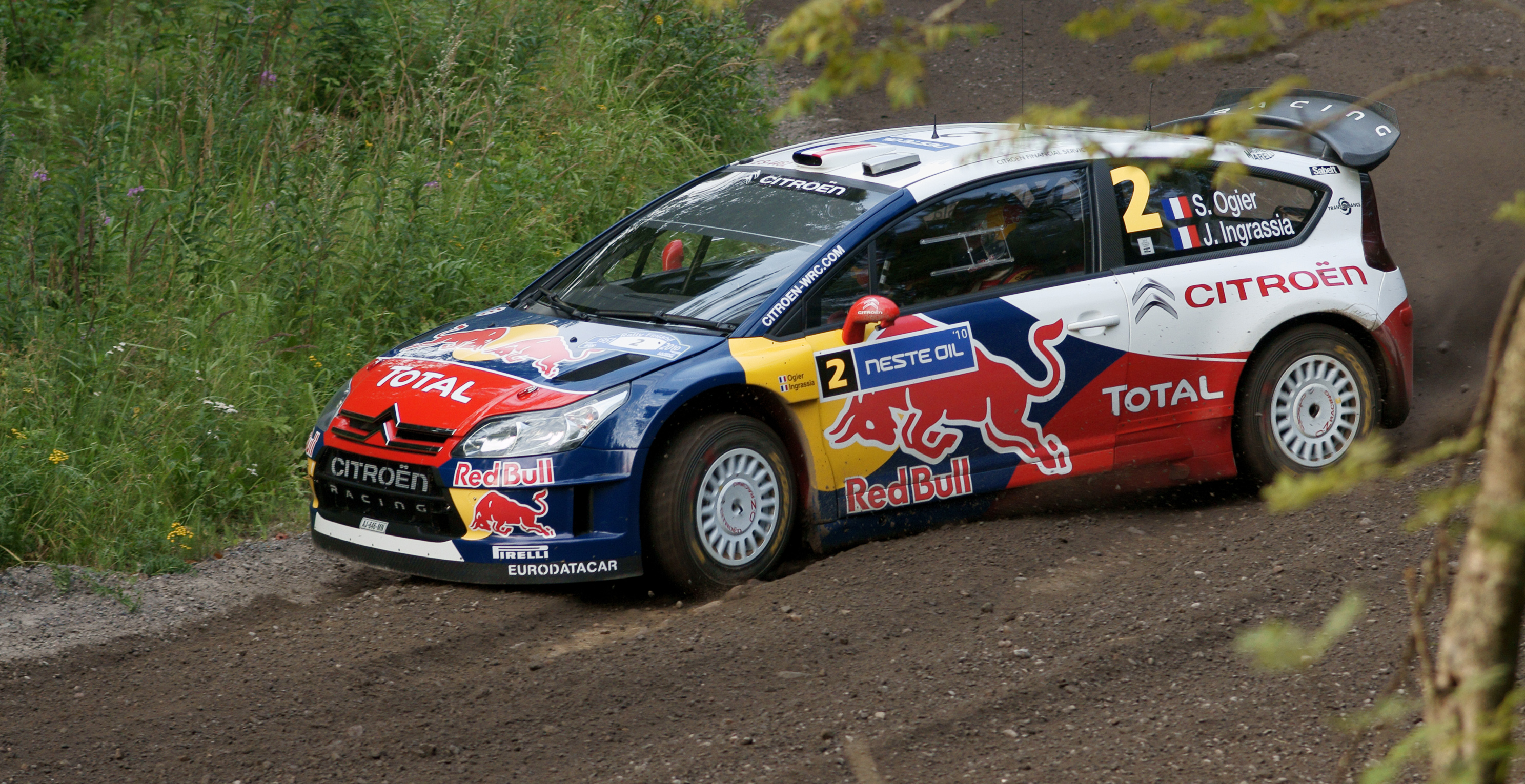
Ogier at 2010 Rally Finland

==== 2011: Citroën official driver ====
Ogier continued his progression in 2011. Given his performances in 2010, he was given a drive with Citroën's factory team for the full 2011 season, replacing Dani Sordo. As he was promised to be treated equally with Loeb, the fans awaited a great battle for the title.

The DS3 WRC did not make the expected debut in Sweden; however, Ogier (fourth) beat Loeb (sixth), and also became the first driver to win a Power Stage. Their battle turned out to a duel in Mexico where Ogier started the last day as leader before going off the road. He went on to win the next two rallies in Portugal and Jordan: with two-tenth on Jari-Matti Latvala, he beat the record of the smallest winning gap. fourth in Sardinia, Ogier came close to another victory in Argentina: while he started the last leg with a 43.7s advantage on Hirvonen, he rolled; this led him to finish with no steering wheel and cost him the win in the last stage. He ended in third position behind Sébastien Loeb and Mikko Hirvonen.

Ogier went on to claim victory on the Acropolis Rally, but his relationship with Loeb deteriorated. Following a classic WRC strategy, the Frenchman slowed down on the Saturday evening to force his teammate to open the road the day after. To do so, he based himself on Loeb's times sent by his team, while a technical problem prevented Loeb from receiving the same information. The rally ended in a controversial atmosphere as Loeb had difficulty accepting to sweep the road on these gravel stages. Loeb bounced back in Finland, while Ogier ended in third position after a puncture during the last day. The tension between the two Citroën drivers knew their peak in Germany, where Sébastien Loeb had never been beaten. Before the start of the race, the reigning World Champion announced the extension of his contract with Citroën until the end of 2013. In that media context, the brand imposed team orders at the end of the first leg, while Loeb and Ogier were separated by only seven seconds, with a big margin over their rivals. It was a beautiful battle and Sébastien Ogier did not accept being sacrificed so early and in such a disrespectful way. This is what he publicly said, giving rise to a huge controversy. The win eventually went to him, as Loeb punctured a tyre.

In Australia, Ogier did not make the most of Sébastien Loeb going off the road as he made a mistake as well during the first day. After a thrilling climb in the standings that brought him up to ninth place and close to eighth, the team asked him to slow down at the end of the rally to let his teammate pass and score one point for the championship: he took a voluntary penalty and stopped on the side of the road for around ten minutes. Also helped by team orders, Mikko Hirvonen won the rally and therefore became a serious title contender, eight points off Loeb. Ogier took a convincing win at the Rallye de France Alsace: after Loeb retired because of a technical problem, he resisted Dani Sordo's and Petter Solberg's pressure and went on to take the maximum points for the team. He also made a good operation for the Drivers' championship and left Alsace three points off the co-leaders Sébastien Loeb and Mikko Hirvonen. Two rounds before the end of the season, the championship seemed to be wide open, but Loeb did eventually clinch the title. After an engine problem in Spain and an accident in Great-Britain, Ogier ended the championship in third position with five wins (as many as Loeb) and four Power Stages' best times (the best rate of the season). His tense relationship with Citroën management led to his discharge, which was officially announced on 16 November. He was then replaced by Mikko Hirvonen.

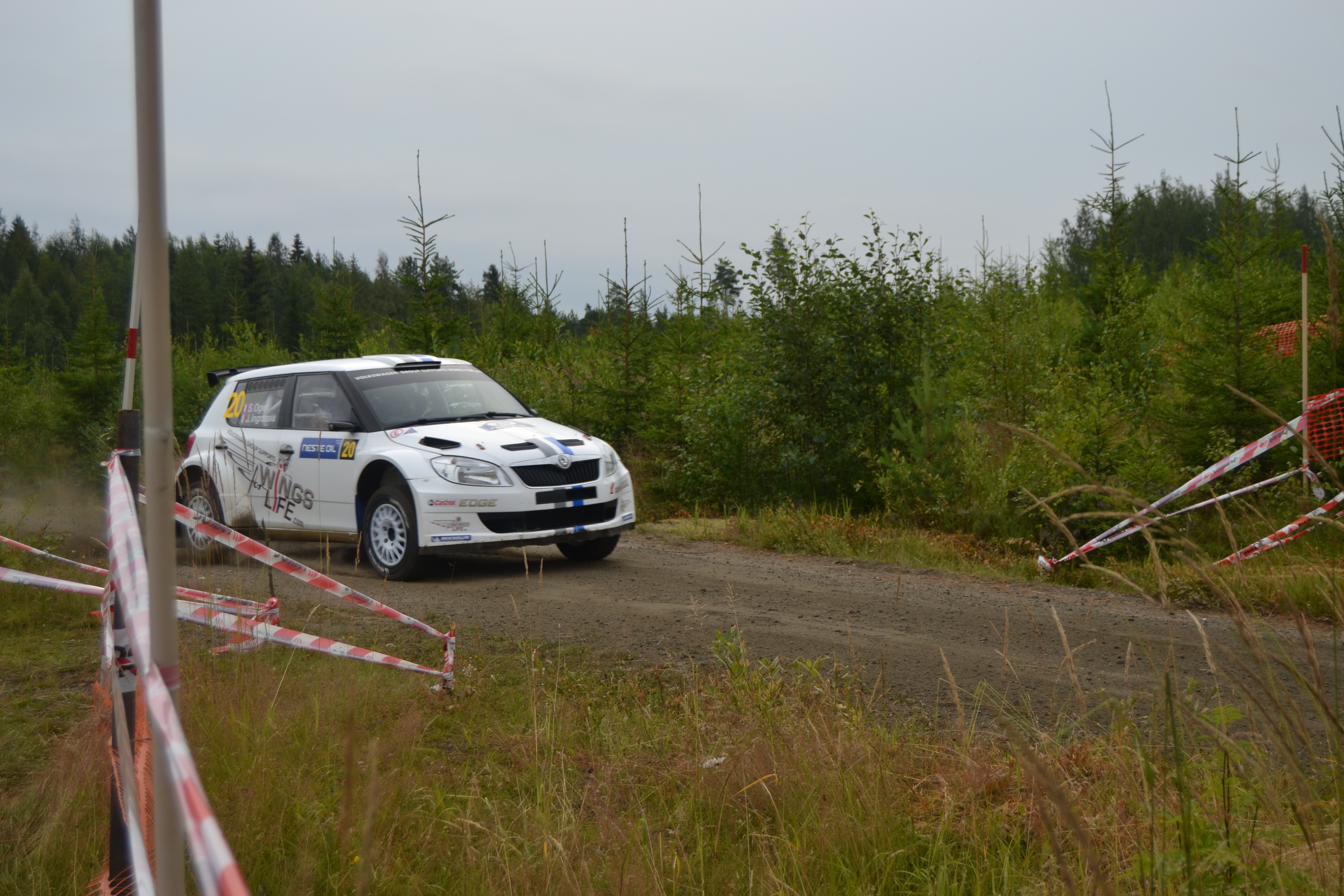
Ogier at 2012 Rally Finland

=== Volkswagen (2012–2016) ===
==== 2012 ====
On 23 November 2011, Volkswagen subsequently announced a three-year contract with Ogier and his codriver Julien Ingrassia. They became the official crew of the team to spearhead Volkswagen's WRC assault, planned for 2013. In 2012, they contested the championship in a Škoda Fabia S2000 whilst developing the new Polo R WRC for a full-time WRC season in 2013.

Ogier's 2012 season started with Rallye Monte-Carlo, where he set some good times although his Škoda Fabia S2000 was less competitive than the WRC that were battling for the win. But in the tenth stage, he went off the road in a sixth-gear sector. Ogier was unhurt; his codriver was slightly injured. Before the crash, Ogier was sixth in the overall rally standings.

In the Rally Sweden, Ogier took 11th place with four minutes of margin on Per-Gunnar Andersson, the official winner in S2000. Sébastien Ogier took his first points of the season and the very first ones for Volkswagen Motorsport with an eighth place at the Rally Mexico.

In Sweden and in Mexico, Ogier had to compose with a superior status compared to the other S2000 drivers and therefore had to sweep the roads for them. This changed at the Rally Portugal and the situation became more equitable. He then scored a series of points scorings and regularly battled against WRC drivers. His best result came in Sardinia, where he took the fifth place – the best result of a S2000 car.

==== 2013 ====
In parallel to his 2012 season with the Škoda Fabia S2000, Ogier followed an intense testing programme developing the Volkswagen Polo R WRC and preparing its debut in the championship.

Launched at Monaco at the end of 2012, the car was ready for the first round of the season, the 2013 Rallye Monte Carlo. Despite the youth of the car and some treacherous weather conditions, Ogier finished in second position. It sounded like an ideal start, a proper relief that confirmed the promising level of the Polo.

The 2013 season went ahead with Rally Sweden, where Ogier became the second non-Nordic winner since its creation in 1950, after Loeb's victory in 2004. His win in Sweden was also the maiden one for the Polo R WRC. He added the three bonus points of a Power Stage win and took the lead of the championship. And this was only the beginning. Ogier then took the victory in Mexico, winning 16 stages out of 23 and another double rally – Power Stage success. Same again in Portugal where he finished with more than three minutes of margin over Mikko Hirvonen, second.

In Argentina, the handbrake gave problems and Ogier lost time with a straight on the mud, which cost him the lead of the rally. As Loeb won, Ogier secured some valuable points with second place. Bad luck struck again in Greece, where he lost his chances of winning as soon as in the SS1, with a puncture and a fuel alimentation problem. Thanks to the Rally 2 rule, he managed to save the tenth position and took the three bonus points of the Power Stage.

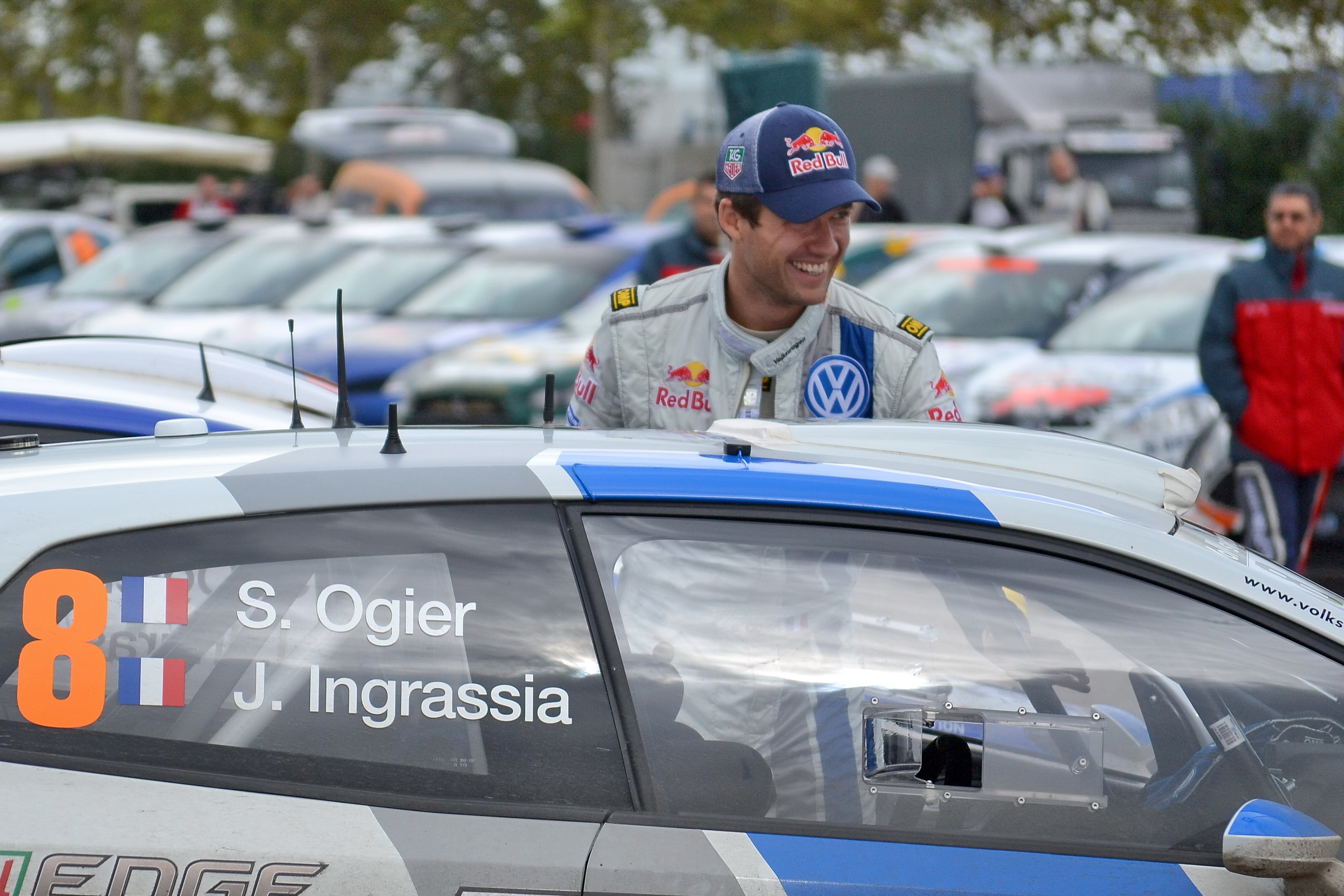
Ogier, newly WRC champion at the 2013 Rally France

Ogier made his comeback on the top spot of the podium in Italy, beating Thierry Neuville and Jari-Matti Latvala. For the first time in his career, he dominated a rally from the first stage to the last one. He also took another win in the Power Stage.

Ogier's winning series went on in Finland, despite his co-driver's shoulder injury. He took the first victory of his career in this rally by winning more than half of the stages – and in particular the legendary Ouninpohja of which he beat the record. With two more points in the Power Stage, he extended his lead at the top of the world championship standings.

In Germany, Ogier already had an opportunity to secure the title. However he broke his front-left suspension missing a braking point during the first leg. Back on the road the following day, he climbed from 47th to 17th in the overall standings and took another Power Stage win. With Thierry Neuville second and Jari-Matti Latvala seventh, Ogier came closer to the title. In Australia, he had real chances to become champion. However, despite a thrilling race, 19 stage wins out of 22, he lost the title in the last stage: as Hirvonen punctured a tyre, Neuville took second place and Ogier therefore missed the title for one point.

Ogier eventually won the 2013 championship in the first stage of Rally France (which happened to be the bonus-points-rewarding Power Stage) because second-placed Thierry Neuville could not catch Ogier anymore even with rally wins. The Frenchman ended the season with some more victories in France, Spain and, for the first time in his career, Wales.

Ogier ended the season with nine wins, 11 podiums, 111 special stages wins (46,83% of the season), seven Power Stages wins and a total number of 28 points grabbed in these particular stages, and a total of 290 points in the championship, a record for WRC.

==== 2014 ====
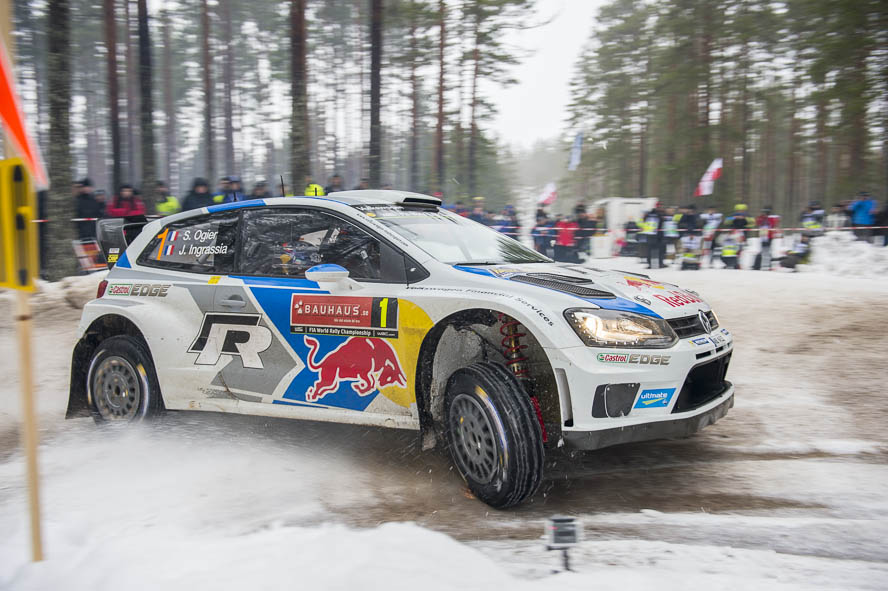
Ogier at the 2014 Rally Sweden

Ogier cautiously considers that a title is harder to defend than to win. However, his victory in the Rallye Monte-Carlo confirmed his leading position in WRC at the start of the 2014 season. Unlike in 2009 this legendary rally was part of the WRC, which made it a very special moment for the reigning World Champion. Despite a wrong tyre choice on day one, he impressed with his climb in the standings and entered Monaco as a winner. Icing on the cake, the start was given in his native town of Gap and the first part of the race was back in the Hautes-Alpes.

Ogier made a mistake during Rally Sweden hitting a snowbank while leading and retrograded to the 20th position. His determination eventually led him to the sixth final place. His revenge came as soon as Rally Mexico: he took the lead in the first leg and increased his margin until finishing with a big margin on his opponents. He also won the Power Stage and was back at the lead of the championship in front of Latvala.

Ogier managed to increase his overall lead on his teammate on the next round, Rally Portugal. He took the overall victory and won the Power Stage again, while Latvala went off the road. Rally Portugal was again synonymous of a win for the Frenchman – the fourth one for him on this round, which brought him closer to Markku Alen's record of five successes. Conversely Rally Argentina is one of the rare rallies of the season (with Rally Poland) where Ogier never won. In very hard conditions, he took second place and the Power Stage win. He was back on the top step of the podium in Italy, despite a tough first leg in which he had to open the road and sweep a slippery sandy surface. In Poland, he won both the rally and the Power Stage, to get a 50-point lead in the championship.

In Finland, Ogier scored the points of the second place and took another Power Stage win. His lead in the championship was unchanged after the next round, Rally Germany, where Ogier and Latvala both retired going off the road. However Volkswagen was assured that the Drivers' title would go to one of the team's drivers (Ogier, Latvala or Mikkelsen). The German squad secured the Manufacturers' title on the following round, in Australia, as Ogier was back on the top step of the podium. His first attempt in securing the championship failed though, as he was hit by a gearbox sensor failure at the start of Rally France. Despite the time lost, he managed to secure the Power Stage points. The relief came on his second try, in Catalonia. As they won the penultimate round of the season, Ogier and Julien Ingrassia secured their second title. Ogier became the eighth driver to take a second crown, the fourth to do so two years in a row. Ingrassia is the sole French codriver crowned twice. The Frenchman ended the season in style with a win in Wales. With eight wins, ten podiums and 94 stage wins, Ogier had a 49-point margin in the final standings.

Volkswagen renewed the contract of Ogier and their other crews.

==== 2015 ====
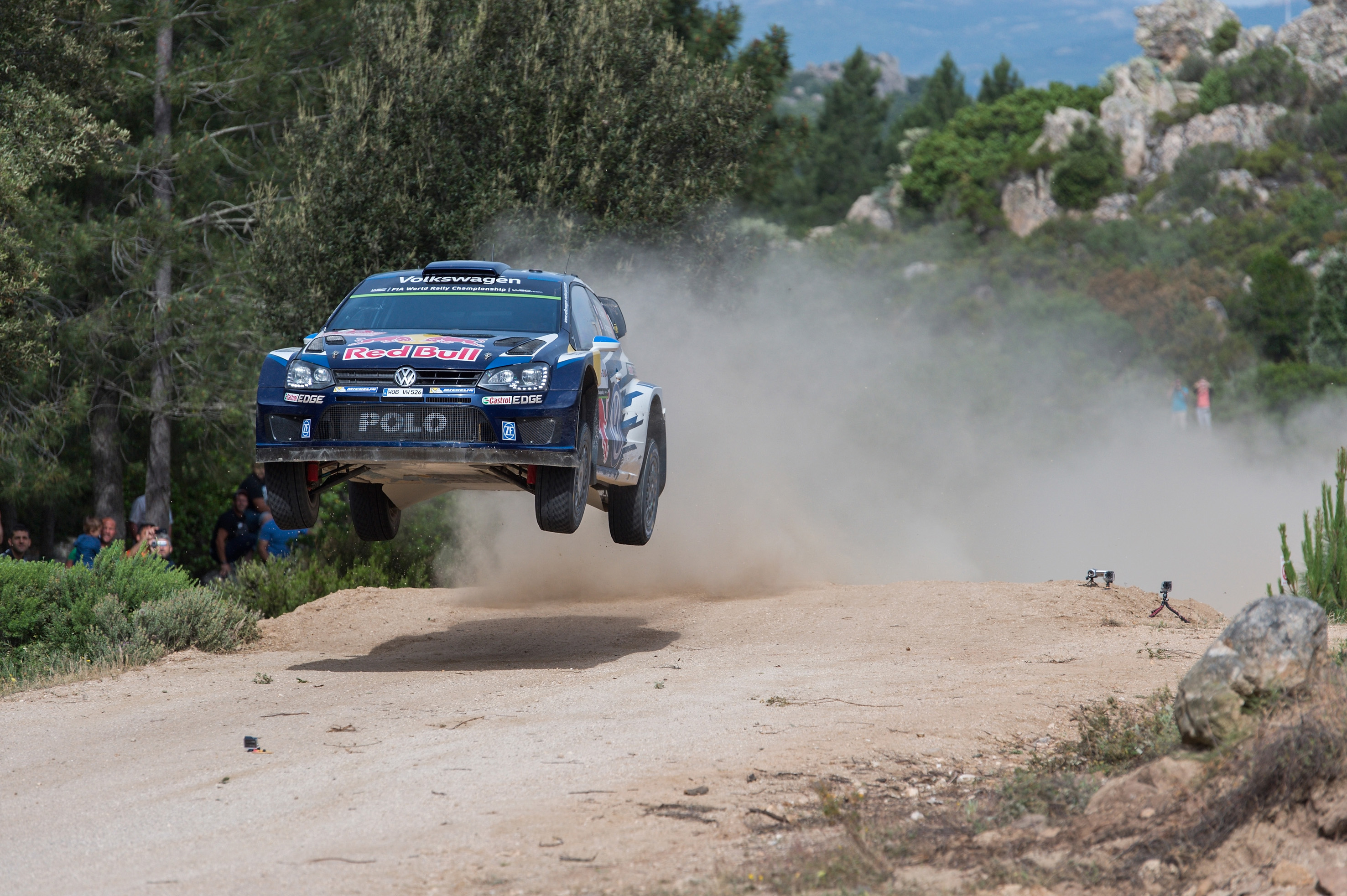
Sébastien Ogier at the 2015 Rally Italy

In 2015, Ogier stayed involved in WRC with the Volkswagen Motorsport team, codriven by Ingrassia. Together, they won the first round of the season, the Rallye Monte-Carlo. The new Polo R WRC was immediately successful and so was the world champion crew despite the rivalry of Sébastien Loeb, who made a punctual comeback to rallying.

Ogier went ahead with another win in Sweden, where he came out as the winner in the very last stage, when Andreas Mikkelsen made a late mistake. Three out of three: it was a hat-trick for the Frenchman who also won Rally Mexico. This was his fifth consecutive win since 2014 Rally Catalunya and the third in a row in Mexico.

Rally Argentina marked the end of the series, as mechanical problems pushed Ogier to retirement. He ended in 17th position and added the three bonus points of a Power Stage win. He won the Power Stage again on the following rally, in Portugal, while climbing the second final place. In addition to the disadvantage of sweeping a very sandy surface, the Frenchman lost time with a puncture before producing an impressive comeback to end 8.2s off the winner. This enabled him to confirm his leading position in the championship.

Ogier managed to come back to victory in Italy. Hayden Paddon produced his best performance to date and led the rally for a long time, but Ogier eventually took the win in the last leg and added again the Power Stage victory to his tally. Another rally and Power Stage double win came in Poland, while in Finland he had to settle for the second place overall. He took another Power Stage success though (the seventh successive) to leave Finland with an 89-point lead in the championship. He led VW to a 1–2–3 finish on Rally Germany, and went on to take the title on the next round with a win in Rally Australia. After taking the lead, Ogier and Ingrassia won all the remaining stages to take their 31st WRC win and their 3rd title. At the same moment, Volkswagen secured the Manufacturer title.

Rally France was not so lucky as Ogier suffered a gearbox failure at the end of day one. Despite a ten-minute penalty which relegated him to 55th position, he managed to end in 12th and won three more stages including the Power Stage. Sébastien Ogier then led Rally Spain for the last two legs but made a mistake in the very last stage. He was forced to retire after hitting a guardrail, a crash in which he and his codriver were unhurt. The season ended with a soaked Wales Rally GB where the Frenchmen won again. They dedicated their victory to the victims of Paris's attacks occurred on 13 November, during the rally weekend.

==== 2016 ====
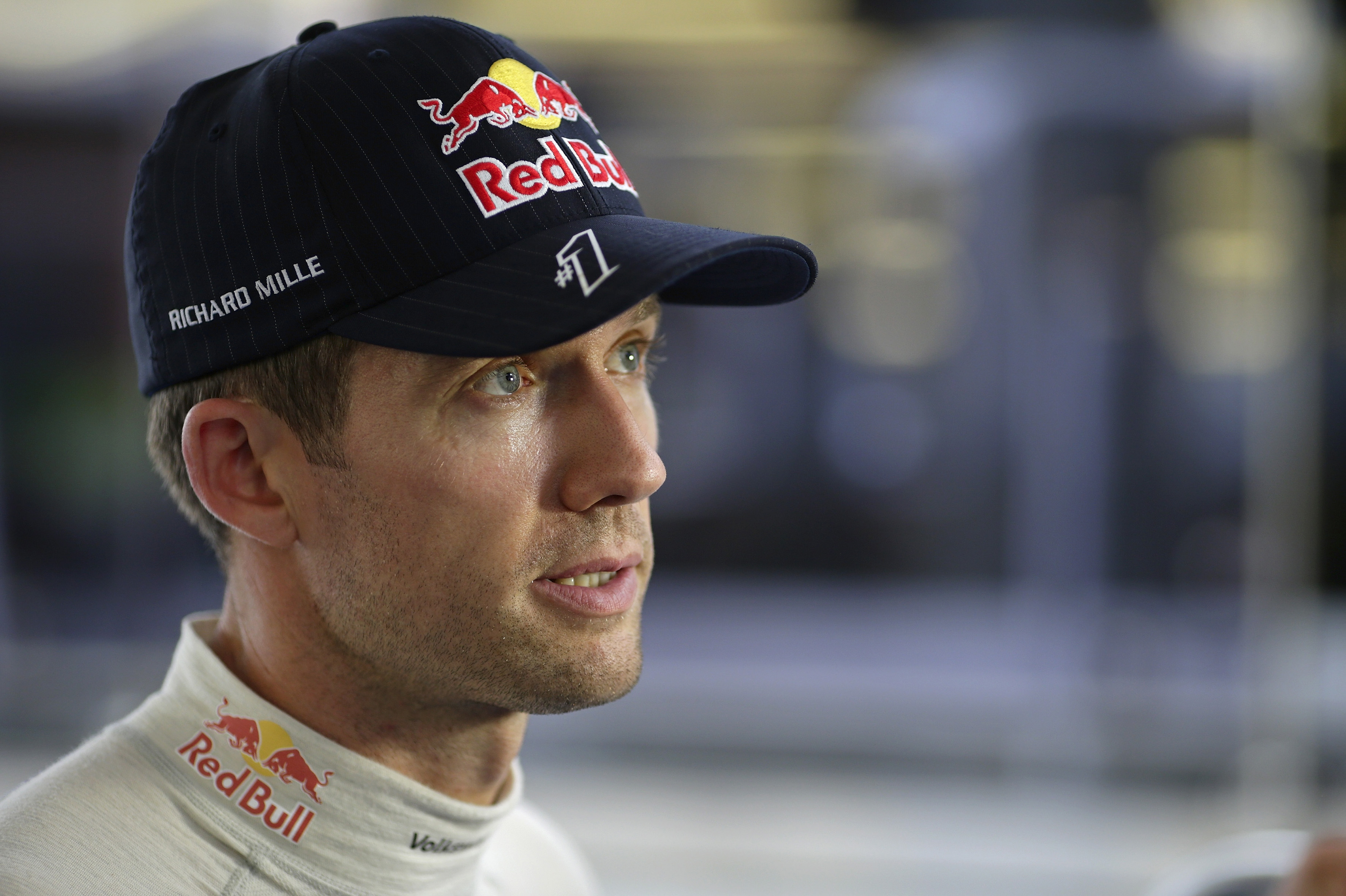
Sébastien Ogier at the 2016 Rally Finland

Still teamed up with Ingrassia in the Volkswagen Motorsport squad for the fourth successive year, Ogier started the season with his third successive win on Rally Monte-Carlo. He then took another success on Rally Sweden, which had been shortened due to a lack of snow. In Mexico, Ogier had to sweep very dusty roads again but still took second place behind Latvala, also winning his third Power Stage out of three rallies. His first place in the championship penalized him again in Argentina, where he took second place, and then again in Portugal and Italy where he finished third. Rally Poland was even more difficult and ended up with a sixth place, before a small mistake cost him a lot in Finland, with no points scored.

Ogier was back to the win in Germany, on Volkswagen's home soil. First full-tarmac rally of the season, it was won by the French pair for the second year in a row as they managed in the best way some very changeable road conditions. Ogier went on to win in Corsica after dominating the rally from start to finish. He was again on the top step of the podium in Spain and clinched the world champion title for the fourth time. His victory at Wales Rally GB brought the Manufacturers' title to Volkswagen, this also for the fourth successive year.

In the days following this success, Volkswagen announced its withdrawal from WRC.

=== M-Sport Ford (2017–2018) ===
==== 2017 ====
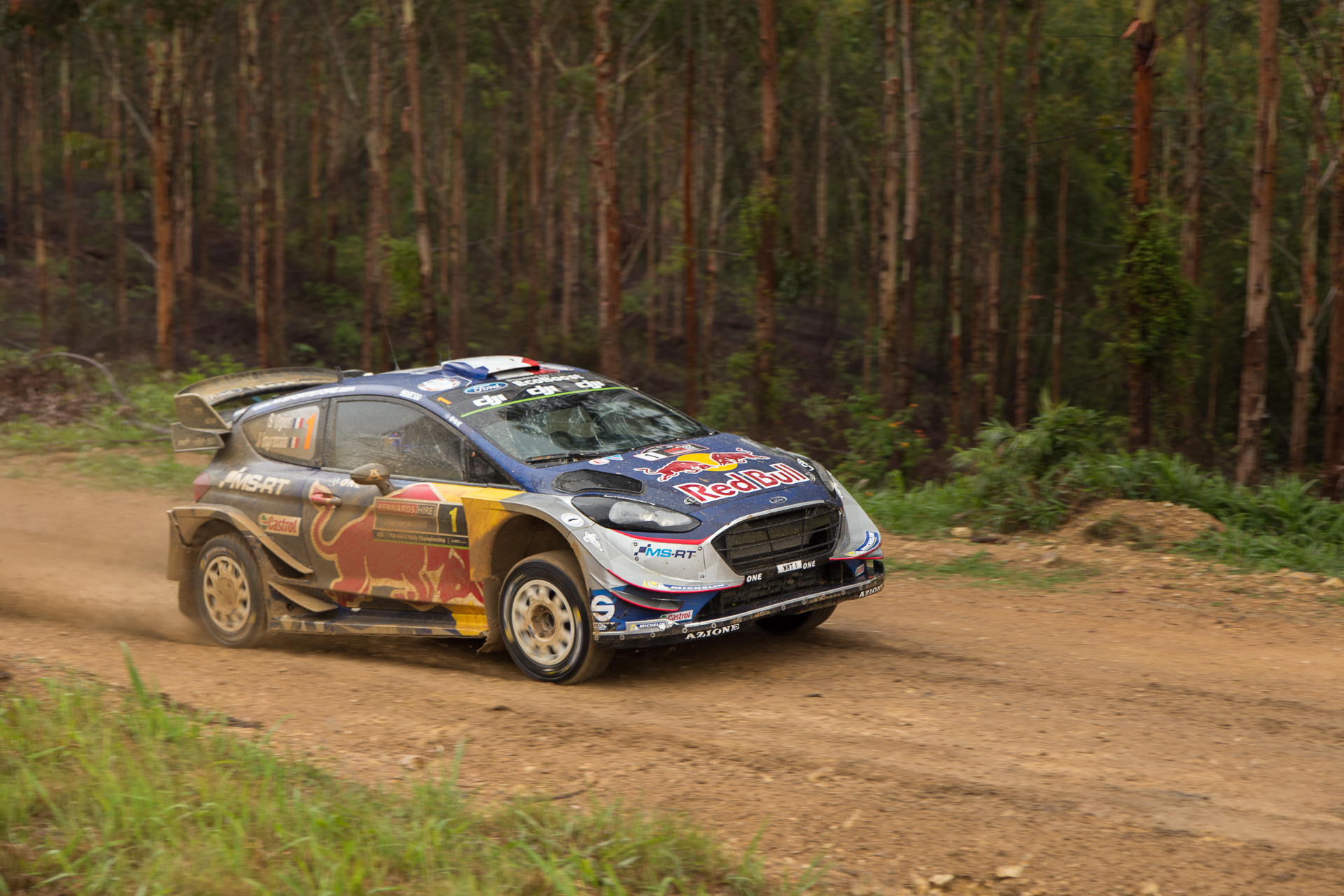
Ogier at the 2017 Rally Australia

On 12 December 2016, Ogier announced he would be driving the new Ford Fiesta WRC for M-Sport Ford during the 2017 season.

On the first rally of the championship, Monte-Carlo, Ogier brought M-Sport Ford back to victory for the first time since the 2012 Wales Rally GB, taking the 39th victory of his personal career and the fifth one on this rally (including one not counting for WRC) with three different manufacturers.

The following months were made of highs and lows, with two wins and less special stage victories than in the past but nine podiums (after Wales Rally GB) that enabled him to score regular points. The second win came in Rally Portugal, where he equaled Markku Alén five victories and reached win number 40 in his career. Thanks to his consistency, he managed to clinch his fifth successive title, celebrating the success at Wales Rally GB, while M-Sport Ford also secured the manufacturers title.

==== 2018 ====
It’s been an incredible [2018] season, so close. Not so long ago we were thinking it was going to be tough to grab this title but we never gave up. We gave everything, with a fantastic team behind us who kept fighting and in the end we grabbed it in the last rally. It’s so emotional.

— FIA WRC NEWS – 18 November 2018

2018 started very well, but turned out to be a gruelling year for Ogier. He won Monte Carlo to take the lead of the WRC drivers championship, but a lowly tenth position in Sweden opened the door for rival Thierry Neuville; who lead the championship for most of the year. Two more wins followed for Ogier, but a retirement in Portugal meant Neuville took the advantage.

The second half of the season saw mixed conditions, leaving the championship contenders struggling for points, particularly in Turkey. A commanding win for Ogier in Wales finally broke the deadlock, and he began to win back points towards Neuville. Three successive wins for Ott Tänak, and a continued resolve by the Estonian, meant the drivers championship depended on the final result of the season finale in Australia. Ogier remained in good humour, and gained the advantage as rivals went off in muddy conditions, ultimately winning the 2018 WRC Drivers Championship. Ogier and co-driver Ingrassia had successfully defended their championship titles for the sixth consecutive year.

=== 2019 ===
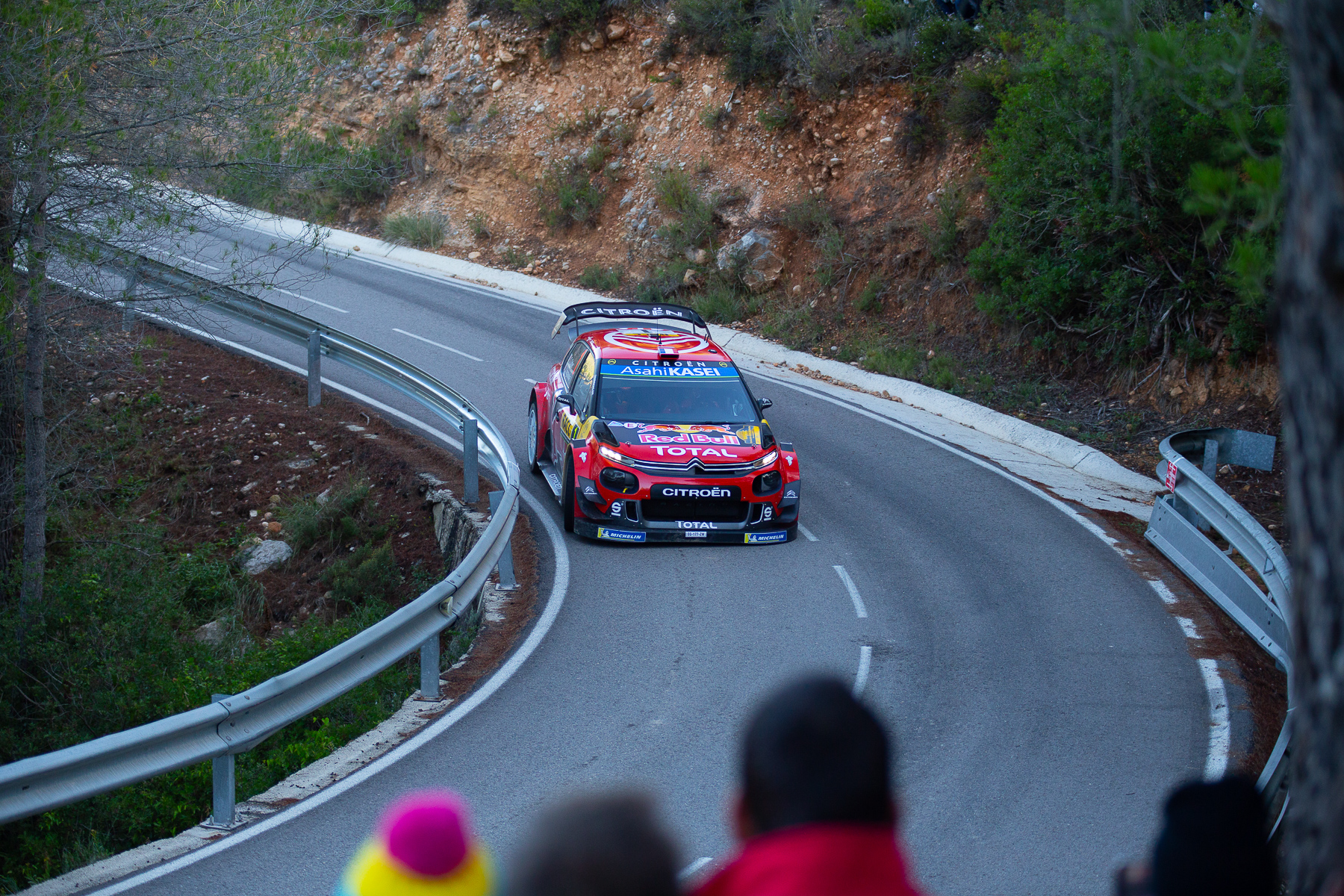
Ogier at the 2019 Rally Catalunya

On 28 September 2018, it was announced that Ogier and Ingrassia will rejoin the Citroën World Rally Team for the 2019 season. This will mark the return of the six-time world champions to the French manufacturer after seven years. Ogier claimed his sixth consecutive win at Monte Carlo, which also marked the 100th world rally success for Citroën. After an early retirement in Sweden, he won at Mexico and climbed to the podium at the next three rounds.

But despite claiming another victory at Turkey, Ogier had been unhappy with his car during the season. At Spain, he failed to defend his title. After leading on the opening stage, his C3 WRC crawled throughout the morning loop after losing hydraulics. Ogier finished eighth in the rally, and with Ott Tänak securing his maiden WRC title by finishing second with a power stage victory, the Frenchman's title chances were effectively over.

On 30 November 2019, Ogier told Autosport he planned to leave Citroën for Toyota with a year left on his contract. He blamed mixed results in the latter half of the season on slow development, a lack of performance, and a lack of communication in the team. Citroën responded by immediately withdrawing from the WRC from the date of Ogier's departure.

=== Toyota Gazoo Racing (2020–) ===
==== 2020 ====
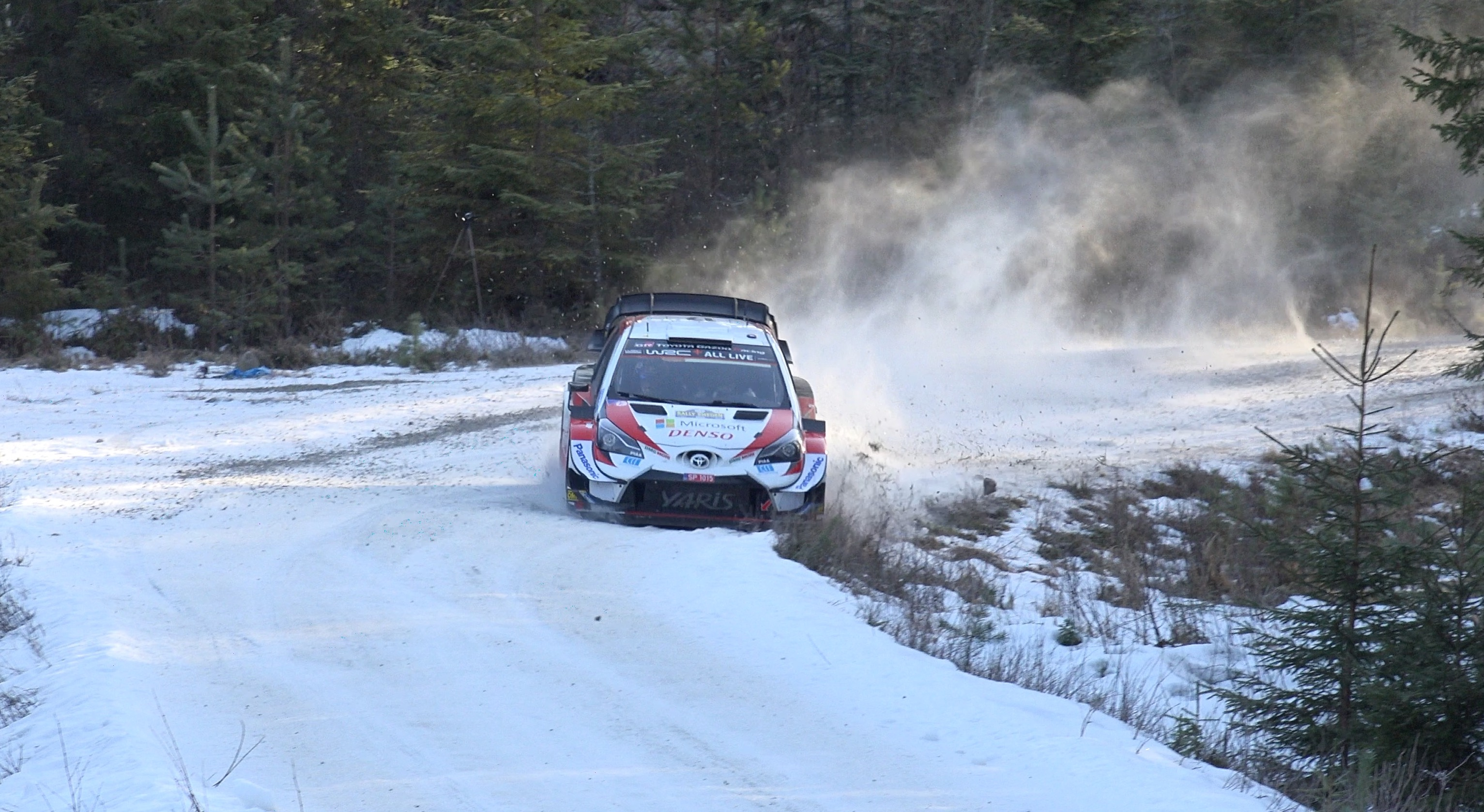
Ogier driving at the 2020 Rally Sweden

Amid speculations and statements about his retirement from the sport, Ogier signed for Toyota for the 2020 season, with an option for 2021. The six-time world champion claimed second place at his home event of Rallye Monte-Carlo, and claimed the podium four further times during a shortened seven event championship. Contender Elfyn Evans took the lead for most of the season, but skidded on ice at the final event at the Monza race track, with only two stages still to go. Evans waved Ogier's car to slow down at the same corner where his car had floundered off the road. Ogier later remarked that this action saved his car from a similar incident, and Ogier and co-driver Ingrassia lifted their seventh world title at this event.

==== 2021 ====
In 2021, Ogier picked up an option on his contract but announced plans to retire at the end of the season. He began the season as the six-time defending winner in Monte Carlo and started off with a 50th career victory, the seventh one in this rally. Next month, however, he had a poor showing in the snowy stages of the 2021 Arctic Rally Finland, including a crash near the end of SS8 that cost him almost ten minutes. He claimed wins at Croatia, Italy, Kenya and Monza later on, and finished third at Portugal and Greece, earning his eighth title over teammate Elfyn Evans.

==== 2022 ====
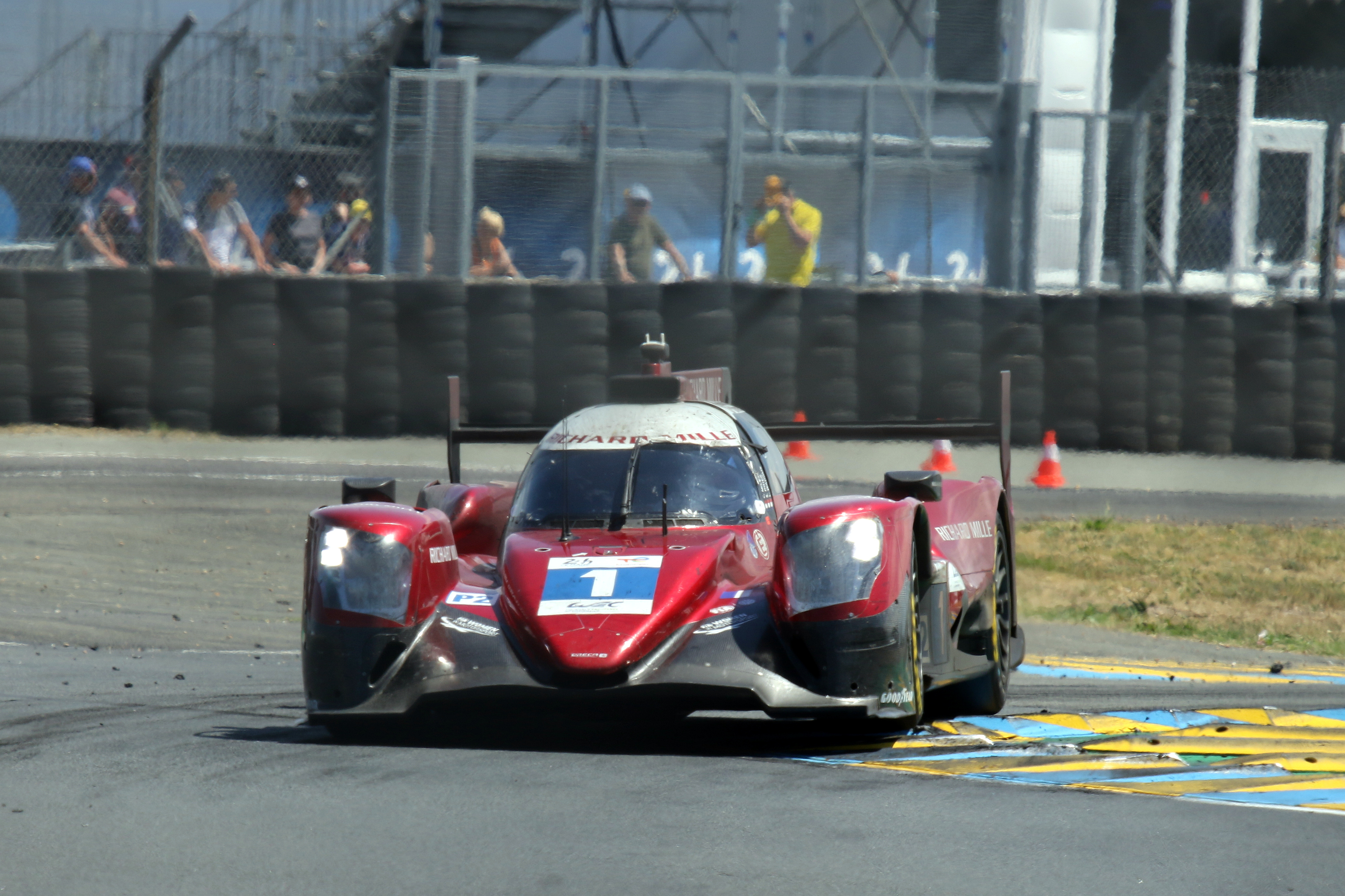
Ogier driving at the 2022 24 Hours of Le Mans

As he wished to spend more time with his family, Sébastien Ogier decided to commit to a partial programme in the WRC starting in the 2022 season, still with Toyota. He only competes in six rallies that year, and at the same time, turned his attention to endurance racing in order to learn a new discipline and discover the 24 Hours of Le Mans in particular.

Often battling at the front of the field, he only secured one victory in 2022. Success eluded him by a narrow margin at the Monte Carlo Rally, where he finished second after losing control following a puncture in the penultimate special stage. Nevertheless, it was his first podium finish with his new co-driver, Benjamin Veillas, who took over from Julien Ingrassia, who had co-driven Ogier since the beginning of his career in 2005, retired from competition after their 2021 title.

Punctures prevented him from winning in Portugal and then in 2022 Safari Rally. He then returned to the 2022 Rally New Zealand, which he had not competed in since 2010, the year in which he came close to securing his first WRC victory. This time, he finished second. He finally broke his duck at the 2022 Rally Catalunya (World Rally Championship), where he clinched his first victory alongside Benjamin Veillas, his first without Julien Ingrassia at his side. To finish the season at the 2022 Rally Japan, however, he welcomed a new co-driver, Vincent Landais, previously associated with Pierre-Louis Loubet. Together, they finished fourth in the last asphalt rally of the season. Sebastien Ogier classified 6th in the 2022 championship, with 97 points.

==== 2023 ====
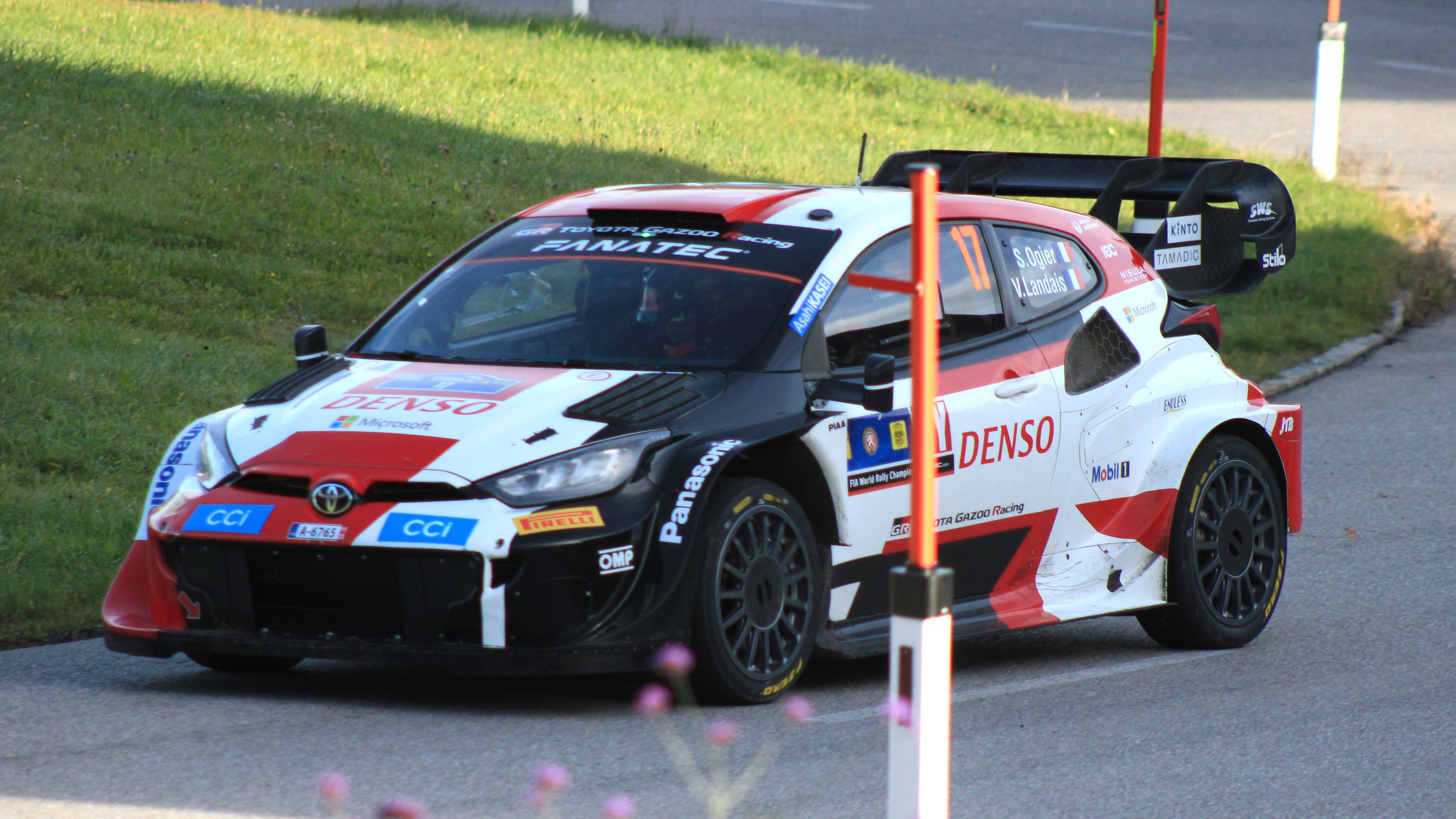
Ogier at the 2023 Central European Rally

Ogier decided to continue to contest selected events in 2023, with Vincent Landais remaining his co-driver. Ogier's first event was the 2023 Monte Carlo Rally, which he led from start to finish, despite Rovanperä's late push. He won the rally for the ninth time, becoming the most successful driver in the event's history and surpassing the previous record held by Sébastien Loeb. After Julien Ingrassia and Benjamin Veillas, this is the third co-driver to join the list of his victories.

Ogier later competed in the 2023 Rally Mexico, which he won for the seventh time, breaking another record of Sébastien Loeb after taking the lead from SS11 following the crash of rival Esapekka Lappi. He would win again in Safari Rally Kenya later in the year and finish fifth in the championship despite missing five rounds.

==== 2024 ====
He continued this part-time programme in 2024, starting with a second place finish at 2024 Monte Carlo Rally after an emotional weekend following the death of his uncle, the man who had given him his first go-kart as a child. Back in Croatia Rally three months later, he won a closely fought rally, with Thierry Neuville and Elfyn Evans both crashing out on the final day. This was Ogier's 100th podium finish in the WRC and his 59th victory. He won again in Rally de Portugal for the sixth time, breaking the previous record held by Markku Alén, and Rally Finland during the season, and was even in contention for the title for a while before suffering several setbacks at the end of the season and finishing 4th overall.

==== 2025 ====
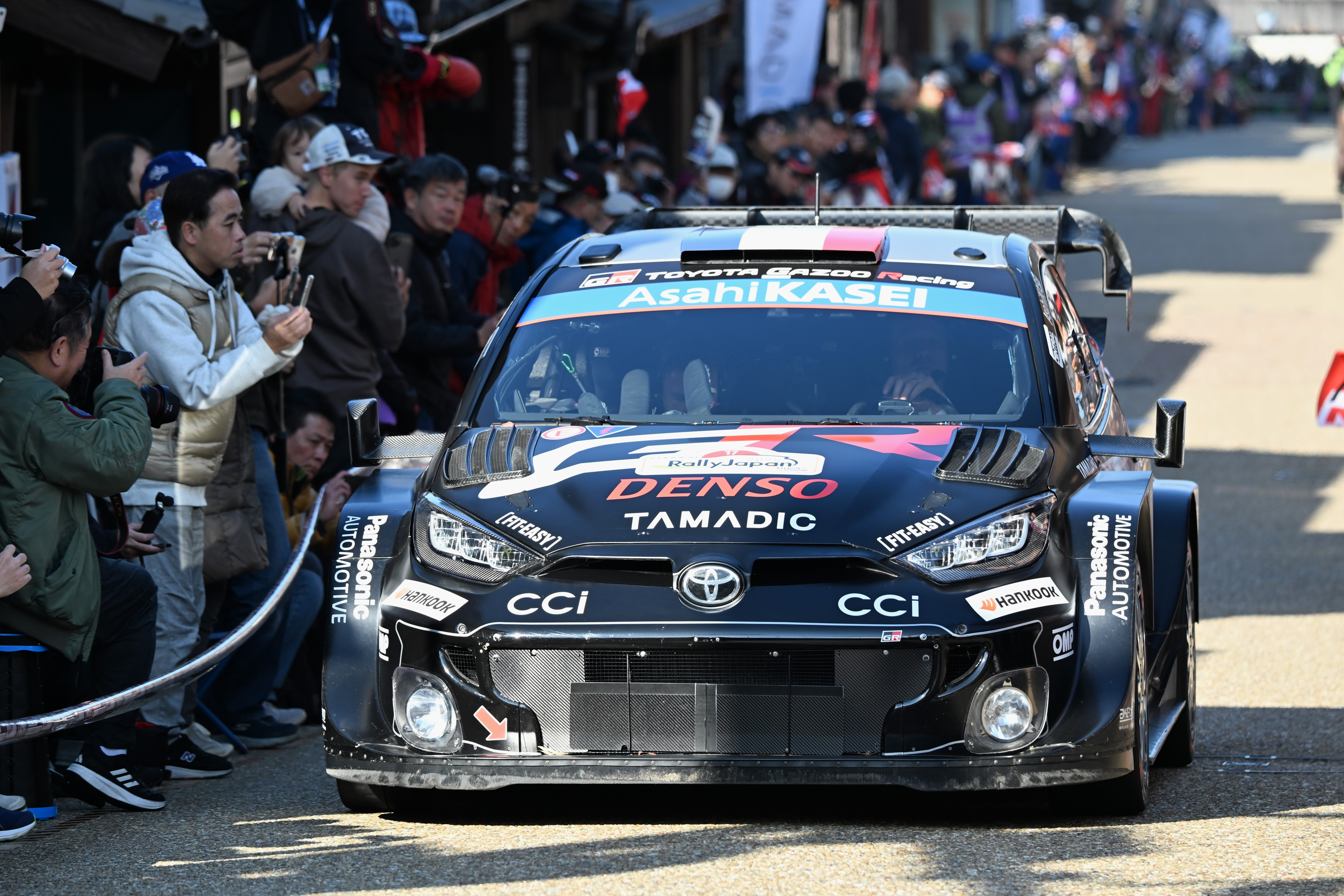
Ogier at the 2025 Rally Japan

In 2025, Ogier and his co-driver Vincent Landais once again embarked on a partial season, missing three rallies in the first part of the championship. Nevertheless, they racked up numerous podium finishes and victories, to the point where they officially decided to do all the remaining rallies and try to chase the title.

Ogier and Landais were finally crowned WRC world champions at the end of the Rally Saudi Arabia, where they were battling it out with two other Toyota drivers, Elfyn Evans and Kalle Rovanperä. The Frenchman ultimately won by four points in the championship, equalling his compatriot Sébastien Loeb with nine WRC world titles.

== Statistics ==
=== Titles ===
Season	Title	Car
2007	French 206 Cup winner	Peugeot 206
2008	Junior World Rally Champion	Citroën C2 S1600
2013	World Rally Championship	Volkswagen Polo R WRC
2014	World Rally Championship	Volkswagen Polo R WRC
2015	World Rally Championship	Volkswagen Polo R WRC
2016	World Rally Championship	Volkswagen Polo R WRC
2017	World Rally Championship	Ford Fiesta WRC
2018	World Rally Championship	Ford Fiesta WRC
2020	World Rally Championship	Toyota Yaris WRC
2021	World Rally Championship	Toyota Yaris WRC
2025	World Rally Championship	Toyota GR Yaris Rally1

=== Victories ===
==== WRC victories ====
World Rally Championship victories (69)
#	Event	Season	Co-driver	Car
1	44º Vodafone Rally de Portugal	2010	(France) Julien Ingrassia	Citroën C4 WRC
2	6th Rally Japan	2010	(France) Julien Ingrassia	Citroën C4 WRC
3	45º Vodafone Rally de Portugal	2011	(France) Julien Ingrassia	Citroën DS3 WRC
4	29th Jordan Rally	2011	(France) Julien Ingrassia	Citroën DS3 WRC
5	(Greece) 57th Acropolis Rally	2011	(France) Julien Ingrassia	Citroën DS3 WRC
6	(Germany) 29. ADAC Rallye Deutschland	2011	(France) Julien Ingrassia	Citroën DS3 WRC
7	Rallye de France-Alsace	2011	(France) Julien Ingrassia	Citroën DS3 WRC
8	61st Rally Sweden	2013	(France) Julien Ingrassia	Volkswagen Polo R WRC
9	(Mexico) 27° Rally Guanajuato México	2013	(France) Julien Ingrassia	Volkswagen Polo R WRC
10	47° Rally de Portugal	2013	(France) Julien Ingrassia	Volkswagen Polo R WRC
11	(Italy) 10° Rally di Sardegna	2013	(France) Julien Ingrassia	Volkswagen Polo R WRC
12	63rd Neste Oil Rally Finland	2013	(France) Julien Ingrassia	Volkswagen Polo R WRC
13	22nd Rally Australia	2013	(France) Julien Ingrassia	Volkswagen Polo R WRC
14	Rallye de France-Alsace	2013	(France) Julien Ingrassia	Volkswagen Polo R WRC
15	(Spain) 49º Rally RACC Catalunya – Costa Daurada	2013	(France) Julien Ingrassia	Volkswagen Polo R WRC
16	(United Kingdom) 69th Wales Rally GB	2013	(France) Julien Ingrassia	Volkswagen Polo R WRC
17	(Monaco) 82ème Rallye Automobile Monte-Carlo	2014	(France) Julien Ingrassia	Volkswagen Polo R WRC
18	(Mexico) 28° Rally Guanajuato México	2014	(France) Julien Ingrassia	Volkswagen Polo R WRC
19	48° Vodafone Rally de Portugal	2014	(France) Julien Ingrassia	Volkswagen Polo R WRC
20	(Italy) 11° Rally di Sardegna	2014	(France) Julien Ingrassia	Volkswagen Polo R WRC
21	71st LOTOS Rally Poland	2014	(France) Julien Ingrassia	Volkswagen Polo R WRC
22	23rd Coates Hire Rally Australia	2014	(France) Julien Ingrassia	Volkswagen Polo R WRC
23	(Spain) 50º Rally RACC Catalunya – Costa Daurada	2014	(France) Julien Ingrassia	Volkswagen Polo R WRC
24	(United Kingdom) 70th Wales Rally GB	2014	(France) Julien Ingrassia	Volkswagen Polo R WRC
25	(Monaco) 83ème Rallye Automobile Monte-Carlo	2015	(France) Julien Ingrassia	Volkswagen Polo R WRC
26	63rd Rally Sweden	2015	(France) Julien Ingrassia	Volkswagen Polo R WRC
27	(Mexico) 29° Rally Guanajuato México	2015	(France) Julien Ingrassia	Volkswagen Polo R WRC
28	(Italy) 12° Rally d'Italia Sardegna	2015	(France) Julien Ingrassia	Volkswagen Polo R WRC
29	72nd LOTOS Rally Poland	2015	(France) Julien Ingrassia	Volkswagen Polo R WRC
30	(Germany) 33. ADAC Rallye Deutschland	2015	(France) Julien Ingrassia	Volkswagen Polo R WRC
31	24th Coates Hire Rally Australia	2015	(France) Julien Ingrassia	Volkswagen Polo R WRC
32	(United Kingdom) 71st Wales Rally GB	2015	(France) Julien Ingrassia	Volkswagen Polo R WRC
33	(Monaco) 84ème Rallye Automobile Monte-Carlo	2016	(France) Julien Ingrassia	Volkswagen Polo R WRC
34	64th Rally Sweden	2016	(France) Julien Ingrassia	Volkswagen Polo R WRC
35	(Germany) 34. ADAC Rallye Deutschland	2016	(France) Julien Ingrassia	Volkswagen Polo R WRC
36	59ème Tour de Corse – Rallye de France	2016	(France) Julien Ingrassia	Volkswagen Polo R WRC
37	(Spain) 52º Rally RACC Catalunya – Costa Daurada	2016	(France) Julien Ingrassia	Volkswagen Polo R WRC
38	(United Kingdom) 72nd Wales Rally GB	2016	(France) Julien Ingrassia	Volkswagen Polo R WRC
39	(Monaco) 85ème Rallye Automobile Monte-Carlo	2017	(France) Julien Ingrassia	Ford Fiesta WRC
40	51° Vodafone Rally de Portugal	2017	(France) Julien Ingrassia	Ford Fiesta WRC
41	(Monaco) 86ème Rallye Automobile Monte-Carlo	2018	(France) Julien Ingrassia	Ford Fiesta WRC
42	(Mexico) 32° Rally Guanajuato México	2018	(France) Julien Ingrassia	Ford Fiesta WRC
43	61ème Tour de Corse – Rallye de France	2018	(France) Julien Ingrassia	Ford Fiesta WRC
44	(United Kingdom) 74th Wales Rally GB	2018	(France) Julien Ingrassia	Ford Fiesta WRC
45	(Monaco) 87ème Rallye Automobile Monte-Carlo	2019	(France) Julien Ingrassia	Citroën C3 WRC
46	(Mexico) 33° Rally Guanajuato México	2019	(France) Julien Ingrassia	Citroën C3 WRC
47	12th Rally Turkey	2019	(France) Julien Ingrassia	Citroën C3 WRC
48	(Mexico) 34° Rally Guanajuato México	2020	(France) Julien Ingrassia	Toyota Yaris WRC
49	(Italy) 2020 Rally Monza	2020	(France) Julien Ingrassia	Toyota Yaris WRC
50	(Monaco) 89ème Rallye Automobile Monte-Carlo	2021	(France) Julien Ingrassia	Toyota Yaris WRC
51	45th Croatia Rally	2021	(France) Julien Ingrassia	Toyota Yaris WRC
52	(Italy) 18° Rally Italia Sardegna	2021	(France) Julien Ingrassia	Toyota Yaris WRC
53	(Kenya) 69th Safari Rally	2021	(France) Julien Ingrassia	Toyota Yaris WRC
54	(Italy) 2021 Rally Monza	2021	(France) Julien Ingrassia	Toyota Yaris WRC
55	(Spain) 57º Rally RACC Catalunya – Costa Daurada	2022	(France) Benjamin Veillas	Toyota GR Yaris Rally1
56	(Monaco) 91ème Rallye Automobile Monte-Carlo	2023	(France) Vincent Landais	Toyota GR Yaris Rally1
57	(Mexico) 36° Rally Guanajuato México	2023	(France) Vincent Landais	Toyota GR Yaris Rally1
58	(Kenya) 70th Safari Rally	2023	(France) Vincent Landais	Toyota GR Yaris Rally1
59	48th Croatia Rally	2024	(France) Vincent Landais	Toyota GR Yaris Rally1
60	57° Vodafone Rally de Portugal	2024	(France) Vincent Landais	Toyota GR Yaris Rally1
61	73rd Rally Finland	2024	(France) Vincent Landais	Toyota GR Yaris Rally1
62	(Monaco) 93ème Rallye Automobile Monte-Carlo	2025	(France) Vincent Landais	Toyota GR Yaris Rally1
63	58° Vodafone Rally de Portugal	2025	(France) Vincent Landais	Toyota GR Yaris Rally1
64	(Italy) 22° Rally Italia Sardegna	2025	(France) Vincent Landais	Toyota GR Yaris Rally1
65	2° Rally del Paraguay	2025	(France) Vincent Landais	Toyota GR Yaris Rally1
66	4th Rally Chile	2025	(France) Vincent Landais	Toyota GR Yaris Rally1
67	10th Rally Japan	2025	(France) Vincent Landais	Toyota GR Yaris Rally1
68	(Spain) 50th Rally Islas Canarias	2026	(France) Vincent Landais	Toyota GR Yaris Rally1
69	(Greece) 70th Acropolis Rally	2026	(France) Vincent Landais	Toyota GR Yaris Rally1

==== Number of WRC wins per rally ====
- 9 wins:
  - (Monaco) Rallye Monte-Carlo*
- 7 wins:
  - (Mexico) Rally México
  - Rally Portugal
- 5 wins:
  - (United Kingdom) Wales Rally GB
  - (Italy) Rally d'Italia Sardegna
- 4 wins:
  - (Spain) Rally de Catalunya
- 3 wins:
  - Rally Germany
  - Rally Sweden
  - Rally Australia
- 2 wins:
  - Rally Finland
  - Rally France-Alsace
  - Rally Poland
  - (France) Tour de Corse
  - (Italy) Rally Monza
  - (Kenya) Safari Rally
  - Croatia Rally
  - Rally Japan
  - (Greece) Acropolis Rally
- 1 win:
  - Jordan Rally
  - Rally Turkey
  - Rally del Paraguay
  - Rally Chile
  - (Spain) Rally Islas Canarias

* Sébastien Ogier holds the record of wins at Rallye Monte-Carlo: 10 in total, with 1 success when the rally was run in the IRC championship and 9 as WRC event.

==== JWRC victories ====
#	Season	Rally	Country	Co-driver	Car
1	2008	22nd Rally Mexico	Mexico	(France) Julien Ingrassia	Citroën C2 S1600
2	2008	26th Rally Jordan	Jordan	(France) Julien Ingrassia	Citroën C2 S1600
3	2008	27th Rally Germany	Germany	(France) Julien Ingrassia	Citroën C2 S1600

==== IRC Victories ====
#	Event	Season	Co-driver	Car
1	(Monaco) 77è Rallye Monte-Carlo	2009	(France) Julien Ingrassia	Peugeot 207 S2000

==== Other victories ====
#	Season	Rally	Country	Co-driver	Car
1	2010	26th Rallye della Lanterna	Italy	(France) Julien Ingrassia	Citroën C4 WRC
2	2011	26th Rallye National Vosgien	France	(France) Julien Ingrassia	Citroën DS3 WRC

=== World Rally Championship records ===
- Most World Rally Championship titles: 9, shared record with Sébastien Loeb
- Champion with the biggest points gap over his teammate: 128 points on Jari-Matti Latvala in the 2013 World Rally Championship
- Champion with the biggest points gap: 114 points on Thierry Neuville, in the 2013 World Rally Championship (290 pts for Ogier against 176 pts for Neuville)
- Win with the slightest margin: 0.2 seconds on Jari-Matti Latvala at the Rally Jordan, 16 April 2011
- Second place with the slightest margin to winner: 0.2 seconds to Ott Tänak at the Rally Sardegna, 2 June 2024
- Wins at Rallye Monte-Carlo: 10 (1 in the IRC and 9 in the WRC)
- Wins at Rally Mexico: 7
- Wins at Rally Portugal: 7
- Shared record of wins at Wales Rally GB (5) and Rally Italia Sardegna (4).
- Number of manufacturers with whom he has won Rallye Monte-Carlo: 5 (Peugeot in 2009, Volkswagen in 2014, 2015 and 2016, Ford in 2017 and 2018, Citroën in 2019 and Toyota in 2021, 2023 and 2025)
- Stage wins rate in one season: 46.25% (111 wins out of 240 stages)
- Stages as a leader in one season: 62.92% (151 SS as a leader out of 240 stages)
- Points scored in one season: 290 pts with the previous points system in the 2013 World Rally Championship, and 293 pts with the current points system in the 2025 World Rally Championship
- Most drivers' championship points overall: 3440 (2008–)
- Power Stage wins: 51
- Power Stage wins in a season: 9 in 2015
- Ratio of Power Stage wins in a season: 69.23% in the 2015 World Championship, with 9 Power Stage wins out of 13 rallies

== Racing record ==
=== Career summary ===
Season	Series	Team	Races	Wins	Poles	F/Laps	Podiums	Points	Position
2008	World Rally Championship	Equipe de France FFSA	7	0	0	0	0	1	21st
2008	World Rally Championship	Sébastien Ogier	1	0	0	0	0	1	21st
2008	Junior World Rally Championship	Equipe de France FFSA	6	3	0	0	4	42	**1st**
2009	World Rally Championship	Citroën Junior Team	12	0	0	0	1	24	8th
2009	Intercontinental Rally Challenge	BF Goodrich Drivers Team	1	1	0	0	1	10	8th
2010	World Rally Championship	Citroën Junior Team	10	1	0	0	4	167	4th
2010	World Rally Championship	Citroën Total WRT	3	1	0	0	2	167	4th
2010	Intercontinental Rally Challenge	Sébastien Ogier	2	0	0	0	0	0	NC
2011	World Rally Championship	Citroën Total WRT	13	5	0	0	7	196	**3rd**
2011	FFSA GT Championship	Sport Garage	2	0	0	0	0	0	NC
2011	French F4 Championship	Auto Sport Academy	2	0	0	0	0	0	NC†
2012	World Rally Championship	Volkswagen Motorsport	12	0	0	0	0	41	10th
2012	Volkswagen Scirocco R-Cup	Volkswagen Motorsport	1	0	0	0	0	0	NC
2013	World Rally Championship	Volkswagen Motorsport	13	9	0	0	11	290	**1st**
2013	Porsche Supercup	Porsche AG	1	0	0	0	0	0	NC†
2014	World Rally Championship	Volkswagen Motorsport	13	8	0	0	10	267	**1st**
2014	ADAC GT Masters	Prosperia C. Abt Racing	2	0	0	0	0	2	42nd
2014	Porsche Supercup	Team Project 1	1	0	0	0	0	0	NC†
2015	World Rally Championship	Volkswagen Motorsport	13	8	0	0	10	263	**1st**
2016	World Rally Championship	Volkswagen Motorsport	13	6	0	0	11	268	**1st**
2017	World Rally Championship	M-Sport	13	2	0	0	9	232	**1st**
2018	World Rally Championship	M-Sport Ford	13	4	0	0	6	219	**1st**
2018	Deutsche Tourenwagen Masters	Mercedes-AMG Motorsport Remus	2	0	0	0	0	0	NC†
2019	World Rally Championship	Citroën Total WRT	13	3	0	0	8	217	**3rd**
2020	World Rally Championship	Toyota Gazoo Racing WRT	7	2	0	0	5	122	**1st**
2021	World Rally Championship	Toyota Gazoo Racing WRT	12	5	0	0	7	230	**1st**
2022	World Rally Championship	Toyota Gazoo Racing WRT	6	1	0	0	3	97	6th
2022	FIA World Endurance Championship – LMP2	Richard Mille Racing Team	3	0	0	0	0	20	16th
2022	24 Hours of Le Mans – LMP2	Richard Mille Racing Team	1	0	0	0	0	N/A	9th
2023	World Rally Championship	Toyota Gazoo Racing WRT	8	3	0	0	4	133	5th
2024	World Rally Championship	Toyota Gazoo Racing WRT	10	3	0	0	7	191	4th
2025	World Rally Championship	Toyota Gazoo Racing WRT	11	6	0	0	10	293	**1st**
2026	World Rally Championship	Toyota Gazoo Racing WRT	11	2	0	0	6	189	4th

^{†} As Ogier was a guest driver, he was ineligible to score points.
* Season still in progress.

=== Complete WRC results ===
Year	Entrant	Car	1	2	3	4	5	6	7	8	9	10	11	12	13	14	15	WDC	Points
2008	Equipe de France FFSA	Citroën C2 S1600	MON	SWE	MEX; 8	ARG	JOR; 11	ITA; 22	GRC	TUR		GER; 19	NZL	ESP; Ret	FRA; 20	JPN		21st	1
2008	Sébastien Ogier	Citroën C2 R2									FIN; 35							21st	1
2008	Equipe de France FFSA	Citroën C4 WRC															GBR; 26	21st	1
2009	Citroën Junior Team	Citroën C4 WRC	IRE; 6	NOR; 10	CYP; Ret	POR; 17	ARG; 7	ITA; Ret	GRE; 2	POL; Ret	FIN; 6	AUS; 5	ESP; 5	GBR; Ret				8th	24
2010	Citroën Junior Team	Citroën C4 WRC	SWE; 5	MEX; 3	JOR; 6	TUR; 4	NZL; 2	POR; 1	BUL; 4		GER; 3		FRA; 6	ESP; 10				4th	167
2010	Citroën Total WRT	Citroën C4 WRC								FIN; 2		JPN; 1			GBR; Ret			4th	167
2011	Citroën Total WRT	Citroën DS3 WRC	SWE; 4	MEX; Ret	POR; 1	JOR; 1	ITA; 4	ARG; 3	GRE; 1	FIN; 3	GER; 1	AUS; 11	FRA; 1	ESP; Ret	GBR; 11			3rd	196
2012	Volkswagen Motorsport	Škoda Fabia S2000	MON; Ret	SWE; 11	MEX; 8	POR; 7	ARG; 7	GRE; 7	NZL	FIN; 10	GER; 6	GBR; 12	FRA; 11	ITA; 5	ESP; Ret			10th	41
2013	Volkswagen Motorsport	Volkswagen Polo R WRC	MON; 2	SWE; 1	MEX; 1	POR; 1	ARG; 2	GRE; 10	ITA; 1	FIN; 1	GER; 17	AUS; 1	FRA; 1	ESP; 1	GBR; 1			1st	290
2014	Volkswagen Motorsport	Volkswagen Polo R WRC	MON; 1	SWE; 6	MEX; 1	POR; 1	ARG; 2	ITA; 1	POL; 1	FIN; 2	GER; Ret	AUS; 1	FRA; 13	ESP; 1	GBR; 1			1st	267
2015	Volkswagen Motorsport	Volkswagen Polo R WRC	MON; 1	SWE; 1	MEX; 1	ARG; 17	POR; 2	ITA; 1	POL; 1	FIN; 2	GER; 1	AUS; 1	FRA; 15	ESP; Ret	GBR; 1			1st	263
2016	Volkswagen Motorsport	Volkswagen Polo R WRC	MON; 1	SWE; 1	MEX; 2	ARG; 2	POR; 3	ITA; 3	POL; 6	FIN; 24	GER; 1	CHN; C	FRA; 1	ESP; 1	GBR; 1	AUS; 2		1st	268
2017	M-Sport WRT	Ford Fiesta WRC	MON; 1	SWE; 3	MEX; 2	FRA; 2	ARG; 4	POR; 1	ITA; 5	POL; 3	FIN; Ret	GER; 3	ESP; 2	GBR; 3	AUS; 4			1st	232
2018	M-Sport Ford WRT	Ford Fiesta WRC	MON; 1	SWE; 10	MEX; 1	FRA; 1	ARG; 4	POR; Ret	ITA; 2	FIN; 5	GER; 4	TUR; 10	GBR; 1	ESP; 2	AUS; 5			1st	219
2019	Citroën Total WRT	Citroën C3 WRC	MON; 1	SWE; 29	MEX; 1	FRA; 2	ARG; 3	CHL; 2	POR; 3	ITA; 41	FIN; 5	GER; 7	TUR; 1	GBR; 3	ESP; 8	AUS; C		3rd	217
2020	Toyota Gazoo Racing WRT	Toyota Yaris WRC	MON; 2	SWE; 4	MEX; 1	EST; 3	TUR; Ret	ITA; 3	MNZ; 1									1st	122
2021	Toyota Gazoo Racing WRT	Toyota Yaris WRC	MON; 1	ARC; 20	CRO; 1	POR; 3	ITA; 1	KEN; 1	EST; 4	BEL; 5	GRE; 3	FIN; 5	ESP; 4	MNZ; 1				1st	230
2022	Toyota Gazoo Racing WRT	Toyota GR Yaris Rally1	MON; 2	SWE	CRO	POR; 51	ITA	KEN; 4	EST	FIN	BEL	GRE	NZL; 2	ESP; 1	JPN; 4			6th	97
2023	Toyota Gazoo Racing WRT	Toyota GR Yaris Rally1	MON; 1	SWE	MEX; 1	CRO; 5	POR	ITA; 14	KEN; 1	EST	FIN	GRE; 10	CHL	EUR; 4	JPN; 2			5th	133
2024	Toyota Gazoo Racing WRT	Toyota GR Yaris Rally1	MON; 2	SWE	KEN	CRO; 1	POR; 1	ITA; 2	POL	LAT; 2	FIN; 1	GRE; 16	CHL; 36	EUR; Ret	JPN; 2			4th	191
2025	Toyota Gazoo Racing WRT	Toyota GR Yaris Rally1	MON; 1	SWE	KEN	ESP; 2	POR; 1	ITA; 1	GRE; 2	EST	FIN; 3	PAR; 1	CHL; 1	EUR; 29	JPN; 1	SAU; 3		1st	293
2026	Toyota Gazoo Racing WRT	Toyota GR Yaris Rally1	MON; 3	SWE	KEN; 11	CRO	ESP; 1	POR; 6	JPN; 2	GRE; 1	EST; 5	FIN; Ret	PAR; 34	CHL; 2	ITA; 2			4th	189

* Season still in progress.

=== Complete J-WRC results ===
Year	Entrant	Car	1	2	3	4	5	6	7	JWRC	Points
2008	Equipe de France FFSA	Citroën C2 S1600	MEX; 1	JOR; 1	ITA; 5	FIN	GER; 1	ESP; Ret	FRA; 2	**1st**	**42**

=== WRC summary ===
Season	Team	Starts	Victories	Podiums	Stage wins	DNF	Points	Final result
2008	Private	8	0	0	1	1	1	21st
2009	Citroën Junior Team	12	0	1	13	4	24	8th
2010	Citroën Junior Team	10	1	4	27	0	124	4th
2010	Citroën Total WRT	3	1	2	10	1	43	4th
2011	Citroën Total WRT	13	5	7	56	2	196	3rd
2012	Volkswagen Motorsport	12	0	0	1	2	41	10th
2013	Volkswagen Motorsport	13	9	11	110	0	290	1st
2014	Volkswagen Motorsport	13	8	10	94	1	267	1st
2015	Volkswagen Motorsport	13	8	10	95	1	263	1st
2016	Volkswagen Motorsport	13	6	11	72	0	268	1st
2017	M-Sport	13	2	9	22	1	232	1st
2018	M-Sport Ford	13	4	6	38	1	219	1st
2019	Citroën Total WRT	13	3	8	24	0	217	3rd
2020	Toyota Gazoo Racing WRT	7	2	5	26	1	122	1st
2021	Toyota Gazoo Racing WRT	12	5	7	43	0	230	1st
2022	Toyota Gazoo Racing WRT	6	1	3	26	0	97	6th
2023	Toyota Gazoo Racing WRT	8	3	4	37	0	133	5th
2024	Toyota Gazoo Racing WRT	10	3	7	52	1	191	4th
2025	Toyota Gazoo Racing WRT	11	6	10	60	0	293	**1st**
Total		203	67	115	807	16	3251	

=== IRC results ===
Year	Entrant	Car	1	2	3	4	5	6	7	8	9	10	11	12	WDC	Points
2009	BF Goodrich Drivers Team	Peugeot 207 S2000	MON; 1	BRA	KEN	POR	BEL	RUS	POR	CZE	ESP	ITA	SCO		8th	10
2010	Sébastien Ogier	Peugeot 207 S2000	MON; Ret	BRA	ARG	CAN	ITA; Ret	BEL	AZO	MAD	CZE	ITA	SCO	CYP	–	0

=== Porsche Supercup results ===
Year	Team	1	2	3	4	5	6	7	8	9	10	DC	Points
2013	Porsche AG	ESP	MON; 13	GBR	GER	HUN	BEL	ITA	ABU	ABU		NC†	0†
2014	Team Project 1	ESP	MON	AUT; Ret	GBR	GER	HUN	BEL	ITA	USA	USA	NC†	0†

† As Ogier was a guest driver, he was ineligible to score points.

=== Complete FIA World Endurance Championship results ===
(key) (Races in bold indicate pole position; races in italics indicate fastest lap)

Year	Entrant	Class	Car	Engine	1	2	3	4	5	6	Rank	Points
2022	Richard Mille Racing Team	LMP2	Oreca 07	Gibson GK428 4.2 L V8	SEB; 12	SPA; 8	LMS; 6	MNZ	FUJ	BHR	16th	20

=== Complete 24 Hours of Le Mans results ===
Year	Team	Co-Drivers	Car	Class	Laps	Pos.	Class Pos.
2022	(France) Richard Mille Racing Team	(France) Charles Milesi (France) Lilou Wadoux	Oreca 07-Gibson	LMP2	366	13th	9th

== Other races ==
=== Formula One ===
In July 2017 he tested a Red Bull Racing RB7 at the Red Bull Ring in Austria.

=== Race of Champions ===
- 2011: Champion of Champions. For his ROC debut, he took the top step of the podium in the finals against Tom Kristensen (8-time winner of the 24 Heures du Mans), winning both heats at the Esprit Arena in Düsseldorf. He became the fourth Frenchman to win the title Champion of Champions.
- 2012: He reached the Nations' Cup's finale with Romain Grosjean and the quarter-finals in the individual race.

=== Other ===
- 29–30 October 2011: He took part in the last round of the French GT Championship at the Paul Ricard circuit. In these 2 GT Tour races he drove a Ferrari F430 Scuderia of the team Sport Garage, as the teammate of Lionel Comole, President of the Fondation Arthritis and amatorial driver. Ogier also contested the finale round of the F4 French Championship with a single-seater of the Auto Sport Academy (i.e. the car that helped him to improve his late braking in corner entering on asphalt during his summer tests).
- 16 July 2011: He took part in the Moscow City Racing with Citroën. The Race of Stars (as it was called) was held close to the Kremlin.
- 11 December 2011: He took the 9th place of the ERDF Master-Kart of Paris-Bercy, against drivers coming from all kind of motorsport series.
- 24–26 May 2013: He contested the Monaco round of the Porsche Supercup, the series that is traditionally held before the Formula 1 Grand Prix. After a 14th place in qualifying, he ended 13th out of 26 drivers in the race.
- 23–25 May 2014: He took part in a round of the ADAC GT Masters, on the Lausitzring circuit. He drove an Audi R8 LMS Ultra of the Prosperia C. Abt Racing team, together with Markus Winkelhock. Together, they took the 13th place in Race 1 and the 8th in Race 2.
- 20–22 June 2014: Ogier took part in a second Porsche Supercup race, this time at the Red Bull Ring. Just like in 2013 at Monaco, he joins the Deutsche Post Project 1 team to drive a Porsche 911 GT3.
- 21–23 September 2018: After a test in August, he competed in a DTM round at the Red Bull Ring in a Mercedes-AMG C63, finishing 12th in Race 1 and 17th in Race 2.

== Personal life ==
Ogier is married to German television presenter Andrea Kaiser. Their son Tim was born on 13 June 2016.

Since 2014, Sébastien Ogier has been a patron for Make-A-Wish Foundation in France, a charity granting wishes for children with critical illnesses. In 2021 he also donated €10,000 of his winnings from the 2021 Safari Rally to each of two charities, the Nakuru Children's Project which focuses on children's education in Kenya and the Ol Pejeta Conservancy which protects Kenyan wildlife.

Awards and achievements
Preceded by Sébastien Loeb; Elfyn Evans	Autosport; International Rally Driver Award; 2013–2018; 2021	Succeeded by Ott Tänak; Kalle Rovanperä
Sporting positions
Preceded by Per-Gunnar Andersson	Junior World Rally Champion; 2008	Succeeded by Martin Prokop
Preceded by Filipe Albuquerque	Race of Champions; Champion of Champions; 2011	Succeeded by Romain Grosjean
Preceded by Sébastien Loeb	World Rally Champion; 2013–2018	Succeeded by Ott Tänak
Preceded by Ott Tänak	World Rally Champion; 2020–2021	Succeeded by Kalle Rovanperä
Preceded by Thierry Neuville	World Rally Champion; 2025	Succeeded by Elfyn Evans
