= Julien Ingrassia =

French rally co-driver (born 1979)

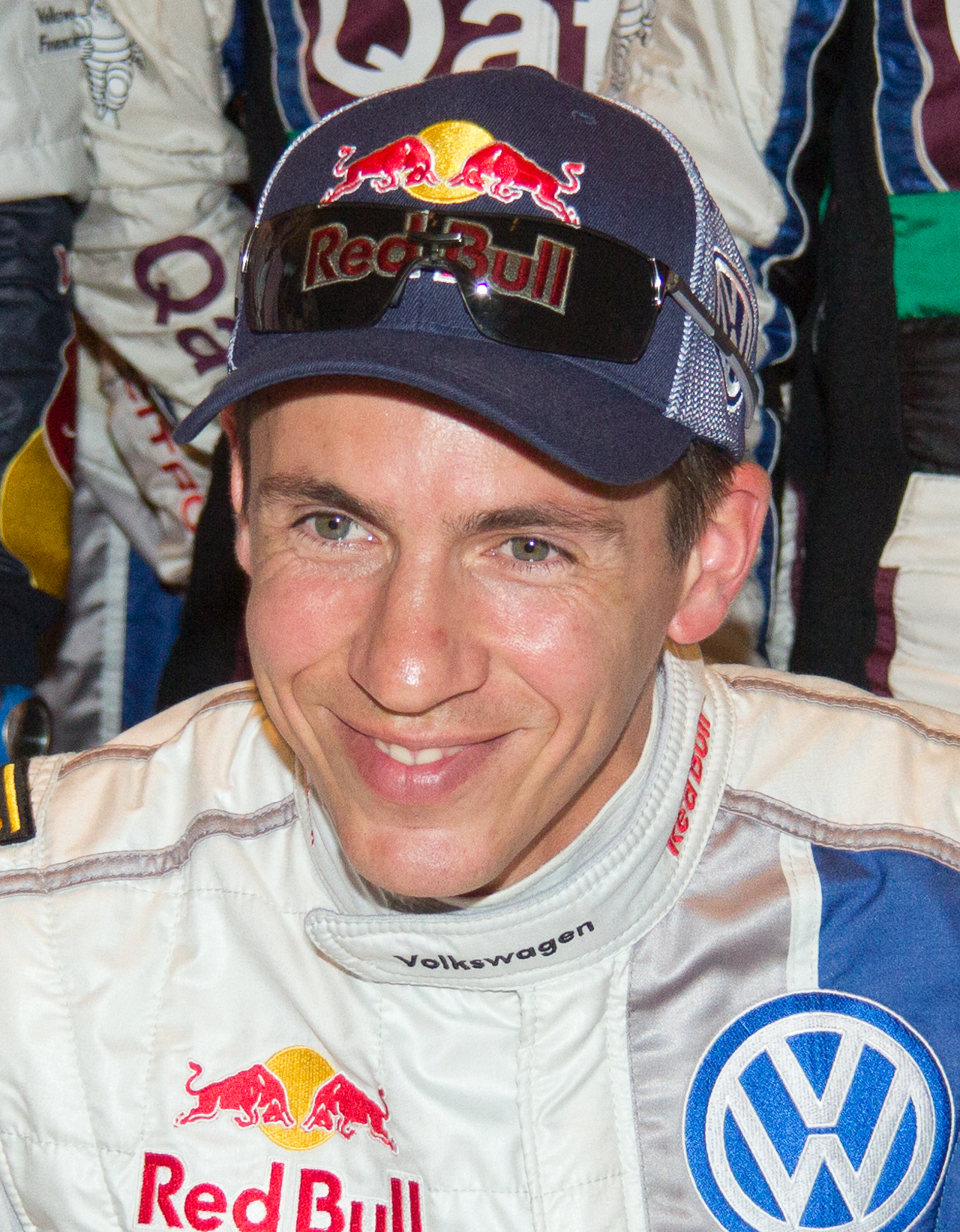
- Ingrassia in 2013

Personal information
- Nationality: (France) French
- Born: 26 November 1979 (age 46); Aix-en-Provence, France

World Rally Championship record
- Years active: 2008–2021, 2026
- Driver: (France) Sébastien Ogier
- Teams: Toyota Gazoo Racing WRT; M-Sport World Rally Team; Volkswagen Motorsport; Citroën Total World Rally Team; Citroën Junior Team
- Rallies: 169
- Co-championships: 8 (2013, 2014, 2015, 2016, 2017, 2018, 2020, 2021)
- Rally wins: 54
- Podiums: 91
- Stage wins: 636
- Total points: 2537
- First rally: 2008 Rally Mexico
- First win: 2010 Rally de Portugal
- Last win: 2021 Rally Monza
- Last rally: 2026 Rally Finland

Julien Ingrassia (born 26 November 1979) is a retired French rally co-driver. Working with Sébastien Ogier, he became World Rally Champion in 2013, 2014, 2015, and 2016 with Volkswagen Motorsport, 2017 and 2018 with M-Sport World Rally Team, and in 2020 and 2021 with Toyota Gazoo Racing WRT. He retired in 2021 but returned to partner Ogier for Rally Finland in August 2026.

== Career ==
While starting his professional life as a sales representative for Coca-Cola, Ingrassia discovered rallying and made his debut as a codriver in 2002 in France's Critérium des Cévennes. For several years, he gained experience in regional rallies, and then competed in the Peugeot 206 Cup in 2004.

At the end of 2005, Ingrassia attended the Rallye Jeunes selection organised by the French Federation and discovered Sébastien Ogier, winner that year. They teamed up for the 2006 season in the Rallye Jeunes FFSA team and Ingrassia codrived Ogier for his first rallies and his first wins in the Peugeot 206 Cup. Together, they learnt their work in regional and national rallies and then quickly entered the international scene.

=== J-WRC World Champion (2008) ===
In 2008, Ingrassia reached the world level through the Junior World Rally Championship with the FFSA French team. Winner of three of the season's six rallies, he won the JWRC title with Sébastien Ogier. Seen as the new generation of French rallying talents, the crew only contested one season in JWRC before moving up to the WRC.

=== WRC (2009-2021) ===
==== Citroën (2009-2011) ====
Joining the Citroën Junior Team in 2009, Ingrassia scored his first podium finish at the Acropolis Rally together with Ogier. A first win came the following season, in Portugal. Promoted in the official Citroën Total World Rally Team for the last gravel rallies of the 2010 season, the crew took a second win in Japan, a rally that they were discovering.

Despite his late arrival in motorsport, it only took Ingrassia two seasons in the WRC class together with Ogier to star at the highest level of rallying. In 2011, the Ogier/Ingrassia crew was full-time part of the factory Citroën team, winning as many rallies as their team-mates Loeb/Elena (5), despite team's orders in favour of Loeb at the end of the season.

==== Volkswagen (2012-2016) ====
After their departure from Citroën, Ingrassia and Ogier linked up with Volkswagen Motorsport in 2012, choosing the German manufacturer instead of Ford: this meant skipping the 2012 WRC championship in order to fully develop the new Polo R WRC, but they indeed experienced a very busy year in 2012, competing in almost the entire season at the wheel of a Skoda Fabia S2000 while developing the new car for 2013. The Polo R WRC was ready at the end of the year and was on the start line at the 2013 Rally Monte Carlo. First special stage and first win! Ogier and Ingrassia ended the weekend on the podium, and then went on to win Rally Sweden. Now leaders of the season, the French crew consolidated their domination rally after rally: they scored nine victories, 111 fastest times and no less than 290 points, a record in WRC. They secured their first WRC title in the first stage of Rallye France, while Volkswagen took also the manufacturers title on the following round in Spain.

In 2014, the reigning World Champions got off to a perfect start by winning Rally Monte Carlo. After already winning this prestigious rally when it was part of the IRC championship in 2009, this was the first time they achieved this success in the WRC class. Also victorious in Mexico, Portugal, Italy, Poland, Australia, Spain and Wales, Ingrassia and Ogier clinched their second title on the penultimate round of the season. Ingrassia became the first French co-driver to have won two WRC titles. With a total of 24 victories in five seasons, he was also at that time the third most successful co-driver in the WRC (tied with Luís Moya, who retired in 2002), behind Timo Rautiainen (30) and Daniel Elena (78).

The French pair remained with Volkswagen in 2015 and won again the championship, thanks to eight rally wins and nine Power Stages maximum points taken during the season, this despite new rules that made it difficult for the championship leaders to open the road during the first two legs of each rally.

With unchanged regulations for 2016, Ingrassia and Ogier made it four titles in a row with six new wins to their credit. They won the championship in Spain and went on to celebrate Volkswagen's manufacturers' title in Wales, before the German manufacturer's surprise announcement that it was withdrawing from WRC.

==== M-Sport (2017–2018) ====
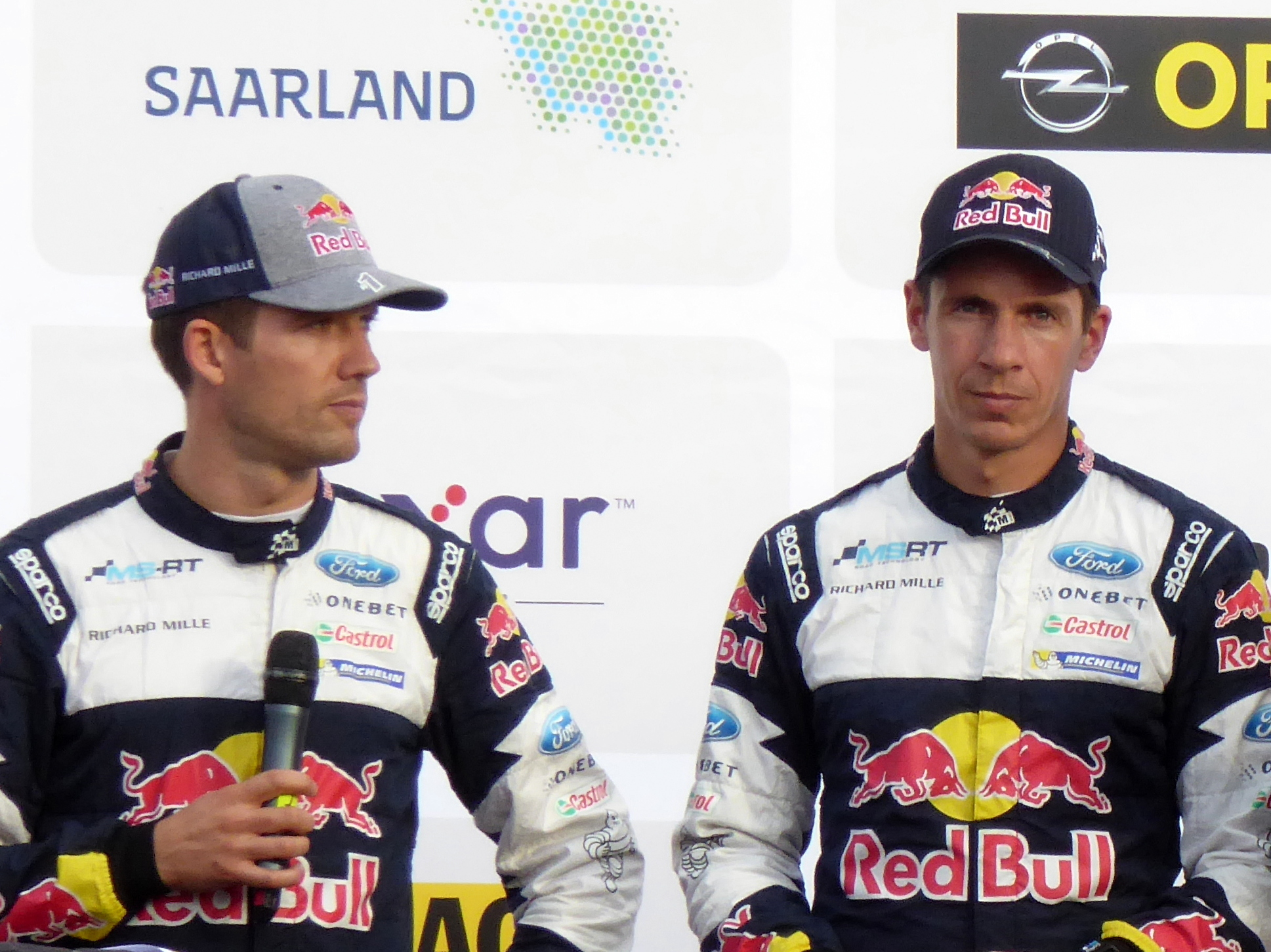
Ogier & Ingrassia at 2017 Rallye Deutschland.

A month later, the World Champions were announced at M-Sport for 2017. They began that new challenge with a victory at Rallye Monte-Carlo and then confirmed their leadership with nine podiums and another win in Portugal. They won the title at the penultimate rally of the season, beating rivals Thierry Neuville and Ott Tänak in the championship.

The duo remained another year with M-Sport. Yet again, they kicked off the championship with a victory at Rallye Monte-Carlo, the sixth for them and fifth in a row, which is a record for this legendary rally. After winning also in Mexico and France, the rest of the season was less successful for them, to the point that they were only third in the championship three rounds from the end, behind Neuville and Tänak. But Ogier and Ingrassia won Wales Rally GB, regained the championship lead in the following rally and then ended Rally Australia with their sixth title.

==== Return to Citroën (2019) ====
Seven years after their collaboration ended, Ogier and Ingrassia were back in Citroën for 2019. For the sixth time in a row, they began the season with a win at Rallye Monte-Carlo, after an intense duel with Thierry Neuville and Nicolas Gilsoul and a gap of just 2.2 at the end, the smallest in the event's history. After a more complicated Rally Sweden, the pair put in a strong performance on the first gravel rally of the season, in Mexico, collecting the maximum possible points with the rally win and the best time in the Power Stage. Despite another win in Turkey, it was a season of ups and lows with the C3 WRC and they ended third overall. The crew then left Citroën and signed up with Toyota Gazoo Racing for 2020.

==== Toyota (2020-2021) ====
For the first time in six years, they were beaten at Rally Monte Carlo, but scored their first win in the Toyota Yaris WRC in Mexico, which took place in early March. While the COVID-19 pandemic began to break out, the event was cut short and the championship went into an enforced six-month break. As the season resumed with new events, Ingrassia and Ogier won the Monza Rally that rounded off a shortened season and clinched their seventh world title, all of them set with three manufacturers.

The French pair re-signed for a final year, this time more complete. The first half was very strong, with four wins in six rallies, including a successful first visit to the legendary Safari Rally.

On 7 October, Ingrassia announced his decision to end his career as a co-driver at the end of the 2021 season after 16 seasons alongside Ogier.

=== Post-WRC ===
Following his retirement from the WRC, Ingrassia worked as a television presenter and commentator for various motorsports programmes and news outlets. In 2025, Ingrassia co-founded the World Rally Drivers Alliance, a trade union of professional rally crew members formed to address concerns by drivers and co-drivers within the World Rally Championship, particularly the ruling by Mohammed Ben Sulayem in the International Sporting Code which imposed harsh penalties against the use of profanities during events sanctioned by the Fédération Internationale de l'Automobile (FIA).

In 2026, Ingrassia made a one-off return as a co-driver for Ogier to fill in for Vincent Landais who was unable to participate with Ogier in the 2026 Rally Finland for personal reasons.

== Stats ==
=== Titles ===
Season	Title	Car
2007	French 206 Cup winner	Peugeot 206
2008	Junior World Rally Champion	Citroën C2 S1600
2013	World Rally Champion	Volkswagen Polo R WRC
2014	World Rally Champion	Volkswagen Polo R WRC
2015	World Rally Champion	Volkswagen Polo R WRC
2016	World Rally Champion	Volkswagen Polo R WRC
2017	World Rally Champion	Ford Fiesta WRC
2018	World Rally Champion	Ford Fiesta WRC
2020	World Rally Champion	Toyota Yaris WRC
2021	World Rally Champion	Toyota Yaris WRC

=== Victories ===
==== WRC victories ====
#	Event	Season	Driver	Car
1	44th Vodafone Rally de Portugal	2010	(France) Sébastien Ogier	Citroën C4 WRC
2	6th Rally Japan	2010	(France) Sébastien Ogier	Citroën C4 WRC
3	45th Vodafone Rally de Portugal	2011	(France) Sébastien Ogier	Citroën DS3 WRC
4	29th Jordan Rally	2011	(France) Sébastien Ogier	Citroën DS3 WRC
5	(Greece) 57th Acropolis Rally	2011	(France) Sébastien Ogier	Citroën DS3 WRC
6	(Germany) 29th ADAC Rallye Deutschland	2011	(France) Sébastien Ogier	Citroën DS3 WRC
7	2nd Rallye de France-Alsace	2011	(France) Sébastien Ogier	Citroën DS3 WRC
8	61st Rally Sweden	2013	(France) Sébastien Ogier	Volkswagen Polo R WRC
9	(Mexico) 27th Rally Guanajuato México	2013	(France) Sébastien Ogier	Volkswagen Polo R WRC
10	47th Rally de Portugal	2013	(France) Sébastien Ogier	Volkswagen Polo R WRC
11	(Italy) 10th Rally di Sardegna	2013	(France) Sébastien Ogier	Volkswagen Polo R WRC
12	63rd Neste Oil Rally Finland	2013	(France) Sébastien Ogier	Volkswagen Polo R WRC
13	22nd Rally Australia	2013	(France) Sébastien Ogier	Volkswagen Polo R WRC
14	4th Rallye de France-Alsace	2013	(France) Sébastien Ogier	Volkswagen Polo R WRC
15	(Spain) 49th Rally RACC Catalunya – Costa Daurada	2013	(France) Sébastien Ogier	Volkswagen Polo R WRC
16	(United Kingdom) 69th Wales Rally GB	2013	(France) Sébastien Ogier	Volkswagen Polo R WRC
17	(Monaco) 82nd Rallye Automobile Monte-Carlo	2014	(France) Sébastien Ogier	Volkswagen Polo R WRC
18	(Mexico) 28th Rally Guanajuato México	2014	(France) Sébastien Ogier	Volkswagen Polo R WRC
19	48th Vodafone Rally de Portugal	2014	(France) Sébastien Ogier	Volkswagen Polo R WRC
20	(Italy) 11th Rally di Sardegna	2014	(France) Sébastien Ogier	Volkswagen Polo R WRC
21	71st LOTOS Rally Poland	2014	(France) Sébastien Ogier	Volkswagen Polo R WRC
22	23rd Coates Hire Rally Australia	2014	(France) Sébastien Ogier	Volkswagen Polo R WRC
23	(Spain) 50th Rally RACC Catalunya – Costa Daurada	2014	(France) Sébastien Ogier	Volkswagen Polo R WRC
24	(United Kingdom) 70th Wales Rally GB	2014	(France) Sébastien Ogier	Volkswagen Polo R WRC
25	(Monaco) 83rd Rallye Automobile Monte-Carlo	2015	(France) Sébastien Ogier	Volkswagen Polo R WRC
26	63rd Rally Sweden	2015	(France) Sébastien Ogier	Volkswagen Polo R WRC
27	(Mexico) 29th Rally Guanajuato México	2015	(France) Sébastien Ogier	Volkswagen Polo R WRC
28	(Italy) 12° Rally d'Italia Sardegna	2015	(France) Sébastien Ogier	Volkswagen Polo R WRC
29	72nd LOTOS Rally Poland	2015	(France) Sébastien Ogier	Volkswagen Polo R WRC
30	(Germany) 33rd Rallye Deutschland	2015	(France) Sébastien Ogier	Volkswagen Polo R WRC
31	24th Rally Australia	2015	(France) Sébastien Ogier	Volkswagen Polo R WRC
32	(United Kingdom) 71st Wales Rally GB	2015	(France) Sébastien Ogier	Volkswagen Polo R WRC
33	(Monaco) 84th Rallye Automobile Monte-Carlo	2016	(France) Sébastien Ogier	Volkswagen Polo R WRC
34	64th Rally Sweden	2016	(France) Sébastien Ogier	Volkswagen Polo R WRC
35	34th Rally Germany	2016	(France) Sébastien Ogier	Volkswagen Polo R WRC
36	60th Rally France	2016	(France) Sébastien Ogier	Volkswagen Polo R WRC
37	(Spain) 52nd Rally RACC Catalunya – Costa Daurada	2016	(France) Sébastien Ogier	Volkswagen Polo R WRC
38	(United Kingdom) 72nd Wales Rally GB	2016	(France) Sébastien Ogier	Volkswagen Polo R WRC
39	(Monaco) 85th Rallye Automobile Monte-Carlo	2017	(France) Sébastien Ogier	Ford Fiesta WRC
40	51° Vodafone Rally de Portugal	2017	(France) Sébastien Ogier	Ford Fiesta WRC
41	(Monaco) 86th Automobile Rallye Monte-Carlo	2018	(France) Sébastien Ogier	Ford Fiesta WRC
42	(Mexico) 32nd Rally Guanajuato México	2018	(France) Sébastien Ogier	Ford Fiesta WRC
43	61ème Tour de Corse – Rallye de France	2018	(France) Sébastien Ogier	Ford Fiesta WRC
44	(United Kingdom) 74th Wales Rally GB	2018	(France) Sébastien Ogier	Ford Fiesta WRC
45	(Monaco) 87ème Rallye Automobile Monte-Carlo	2019	(France) Sébastien Ogier	Citroën C3 WRC
46	(Mexico) 33rd Rally Guanajuato México	2019	(France) Sébastien Ogier	Citroën C3 WRC
47	12th Rally Turkey	2019	(France) Sébastien Ogier	Citroën C3 WRC
48	(Mexico) 34th Rally Guanajuato México	2020	(France) Sébastien Ogier	Toyota Yaris WRC
49	(Italy) ACI Rally Monza	2020	(France) Sébastien Ogier	Toyota Yaris WRC
50	(Monaco) 89ème Rallye Automobile Monte-Carlo	2021	(France) Sébastien Ogier	Toyota Yaris WRC
51	45th Croatia Rally	2021	(France) Sébastien Ogier	Toyota Yaris WRC
52	(Italy) 18th Rally Italia Sardegna	2021	(France) Sébastien Ogier	Toyota Yaris WRC
53	(Kenya) 68th Safari Rally	2021	(France) Sébastien Ogier	Toyota Yaris WRC
54	(Italy) ACI Rally Monza	2021	(France) Sébastien Ogier	Toyota Yaris WRC

==== JWRC victories ====
#	Season	Rally	Country	Driver	Car
1	2008	22nd Rally Mexico	Mexico	(France) Sébastien Ogier	Citroën C2 S1600
2	2008	26th Rally Jordan	Jordan	(France) Sébastien Ogier	Citroën C2 S1600
3	2008	27th Rally Germany	Germany	(France) Sébastien Ogier	Citroën C2 S1600

==== IRC Victories ====
#	Event	Season	Driver	Car
1	(Monaco) 77th Rallye Monte-Carlo	2009	(France) Sébastien Ogier	Peugeot 207 S2000

==== Other victories ====
#	Season	Rally	Country	Driver	Car
1	2010	26th Rallye della Lanterna	Italy	(France) Sébastien Ogier	Citroën C4 WRC
2	2011	26th Rallye National Vosgien	France	(France) Sébastien Ogier	Citroën DS3 WRC

=== World rally championship records ===
- Win with the slightest margin: 0.2 seconds on Jari-Matti Latvala at the Rally Jordan, 16 April 2011
- Stage wins rate in one season: 46.25% (111 wins out of 240 stages)
- Stages as a leader in one season: 62.92% (151 SS as a leader out of 240 stages)
- Points scored in one season: 290 pts in the 2013 World Rally Championship
- Most codrivers' championship points overall: 2511 (2008–)

== Rally records ==
=== WRC results ===
==== Complete WRC results ====
Year	Entrant	Car	1	2	3	4	5	6	7	8	9	10	11	12	13	14	15	WDC	Points
2008	Equipe de France FFSA	Citroën C2 S1600	MON	SWE	MEX; 8	ARG	JOR; 11	ITA; 22	GRC	TUR		GER; 19	NZL	ESP; Ret	FRA; 20	JPN		21st	1
2008	Sébastien Ogier	Citroën C2 R2									FIN; 35							21st	1
2008	Equipe de France FFSA	Citroën C4 WRC															GBR; 26	21st	1
2009	Citroën Junior Team	Citroën C4 WRC	IRE; 6	NOR; 10	CYP; Ret	POR; 17	ARG; 7	ITA; Ret	GRE; 2	POL; Ret	FIN; 6	AUS; 5	ESP; 5	GBR; Ret				8th	24
2010	Citroën Junior Team	Citroën C4 WRC	SWE; 5	MEX; 3	JOR; 6	TUR; 4	NZL; 2	POR; 1	BUL; 4		GER; 3		FRA; 6	ESP; 10				4th	167
2010	Citroën Total WRT	Citroën C4 WRC								FIN; 2		JPN; 1			GBR; Ret			4th	167
2011	Citroën Total WRT	Citroën DS3 WRC	SWE; 4	MEX; Ret	POR; 1	JOR; 1	ITA; 4	ARG; 3	GRE; 1	FIN; 3	GER; 1	AUS; 11	FRA; 1	ESP; Ret	GBR; 11			3rd	196
2012	Volkswagen Motorsport	Škoda Fabia S2000	MON; Ret	SWE; 11	MEX; 8	POR; 7	ARG; 7	GRE; 7	NZL	FIN; 10	GER; 6	GBR; 12	FRA; 11	ITA; 5	ESP; Ret			10th	41
2013	Volkswagen Motorsport	Volkswagen Polo R WRC	MON; 2	SWE; 1	MEX; 1	POR; 1	ARG; 2	GRE; 10	ITA; 1	FIN; 1	GER; 17	AUS; 1	FRA; 1	ESP; 1	GBR; 1			1st	290
2014	Volkswagen Motorsport	Volkswagen Polo R WRC	MON; 1	SWE; 6	MEX; 1	POR; 1	ARG; 2	ITA; 1	POL; 1	FIN; 2	GER; Ret	AUS; 1	FRA; 13	ESP; 1	GBR; 1			1st	267
2015	Volkswagen Motorsport	Volkswagen Polo R WRC	MON; 1	SWE; 1	MEX; 1	ARG; 17	POR; 2	ITA; 1	POL; 1	FIN; 2	GER; 1	AUS; 1	FRA; 15	ESP; Ret	GBR; 1			1st	263
2016	Volkswagen Motorsport	Volkswagen Polo R WRC	MON; 1	SWE; 1	MEX; 2	ARG; 2	POR; 3	ITA; 3	POL; 6	FIN; 24	GER; 1	CHN; C	FRA; 1	ESP; 1	GBR; 1	AUS; 2		1st	268
2017	M-Sport	Ford Fiesta WRC	MON; 1	SWE; 3	MEX; 2	FRA; 2	ARG; 4	POR; 1	ITA; 5	POL; 3	FIN; Ret	GER; 3	ESP; 2	GBR; 3	AUS; 4			1st	232
2018	M-Sport Ford	Ford Fiesta WRC	MON; 1	SWE; 10	MEX; 1	FRA; 1	ARG; 4	POR; Ret	ITA; 2	FIN; 5	GER; 4	TUR; 10	GBR; 1	ESP; 2	AUS; 5			1st	219
2019	Citroën Total WRT	Citroën C3 WRC	MON; 1	SWE; 29	MEX; 1	FRA; 2	ARG; 3	CHL; 2	POR; 3	ITA; 41	FIN; 5	GER; 7	TUR; 1	GBR; 3	ESP; 8	AUS; C		3rd	217
2020	Toyota Gazoo Racing WRT	Toyota Yaris WRC	MON; 2	SWE; 4	MEX; 1	EST; 3	TUR; Ret	ITA; 3	MNZ; 1									1st	122
2021	Toyota Gazoo Racing WRT	Toyota Yaris WRC	MON; 1	ARC; 20	CRO; 1	POR; 3	ITA; 1	KEN; 1	EST; 4	BEL; 5	GRE; 3	FIN; 5	ESP; 4	MNZ; 1				1st	230
2026	Toyota Gazoo Racing WRT	Toyota GR Yaris Rally1	MON	SWE	KEN	CRO	ESP	POR	JPN	GRE	EST	FIN; Ret	PAR	CHL	ITA			NC	0

==== Complete JWRC results ====
Year	Entrant	Car	1	2	3	4	5	6	7	JWRC	Points
2008	Equipe de France FFSA	Citroën C2 S1600	MEX; 1	JOR; 1	ITA; 5	FIN	GER; 1	ESP; Ret	FRA; 2	1st	42

=== Full results in WRC ===
Season	Team	Starts	Victories	Podiums	Stage wins	DNF	Points	Final result
2008	Private	8	0	0	1	1	1	21st
2009	Citroën Junior Team	12	0	1	13 **	4	24	8th
2010	Citroën Junior Team	10	1	4	27 *	0	124	4th
2010	Citroën Total WRT	3	1	2	10	1	43	4th
2011	Citroën Total WRT	13	5	7	56 **	2	196	3rd
2012	Volkswagen Motorsport	12	0	0	1	2	41	10th
2013	Volkswagen Motorsport	13	9	11	110 *	0	290	1st
2014	Volkswagen Motorsport	13	8	10	94	1	267	1st
2015	Volkswagen Motorsport	13	8	10	95 **	1	263	1st
2016	Volkswagen Motorsport	13	6	11	72 ****	0	268	1st
2017	M-Sport	13	2	9	22	1	232	1st
2018	M-Sport	13	4	6	38	1	219	1st
2019	Citroën Total WRT	13	3	8	24*	0	217	3rd
2020	Toyota Gazoo Racing WRT	7	2	5	26*	1	122	1st
2021	Toyota Gazoo Racing WRT	12	5	7	43*****	0	230	1st
2026	Toyota Gazoo Racing WRT	1	0	0	5	1	0	NC
Total		169	54	91	636	16	2537	

(*) including one ex-aequo stage win
(**) including two ex-aequo stage wins
(****) including four ex-aequo stage wins
(*****) including five ex-aequo stage wins

=== IRC results ===
Year	Entrant	Car	1	2	3	4	5	6	7	8	9	10	11	12	WDC	Points
2009	BF Goodrich Drivers Team	Peugeot 207 S2000	MON; 1	BRA	KEN	POR	BEL	RUS	POR	CZE	ESP	ITA	SCO		8th	10
2010	Sébastien Ogier	Peugeot 207 S2000	MON; Ret	BRA	ARG	CAN	ITA; Ret	BEL	AZO	MAD	CZE	ITA	SCO	CYP	–	0
