= Hans Weijs =

Dutch rally driver (born 1986)

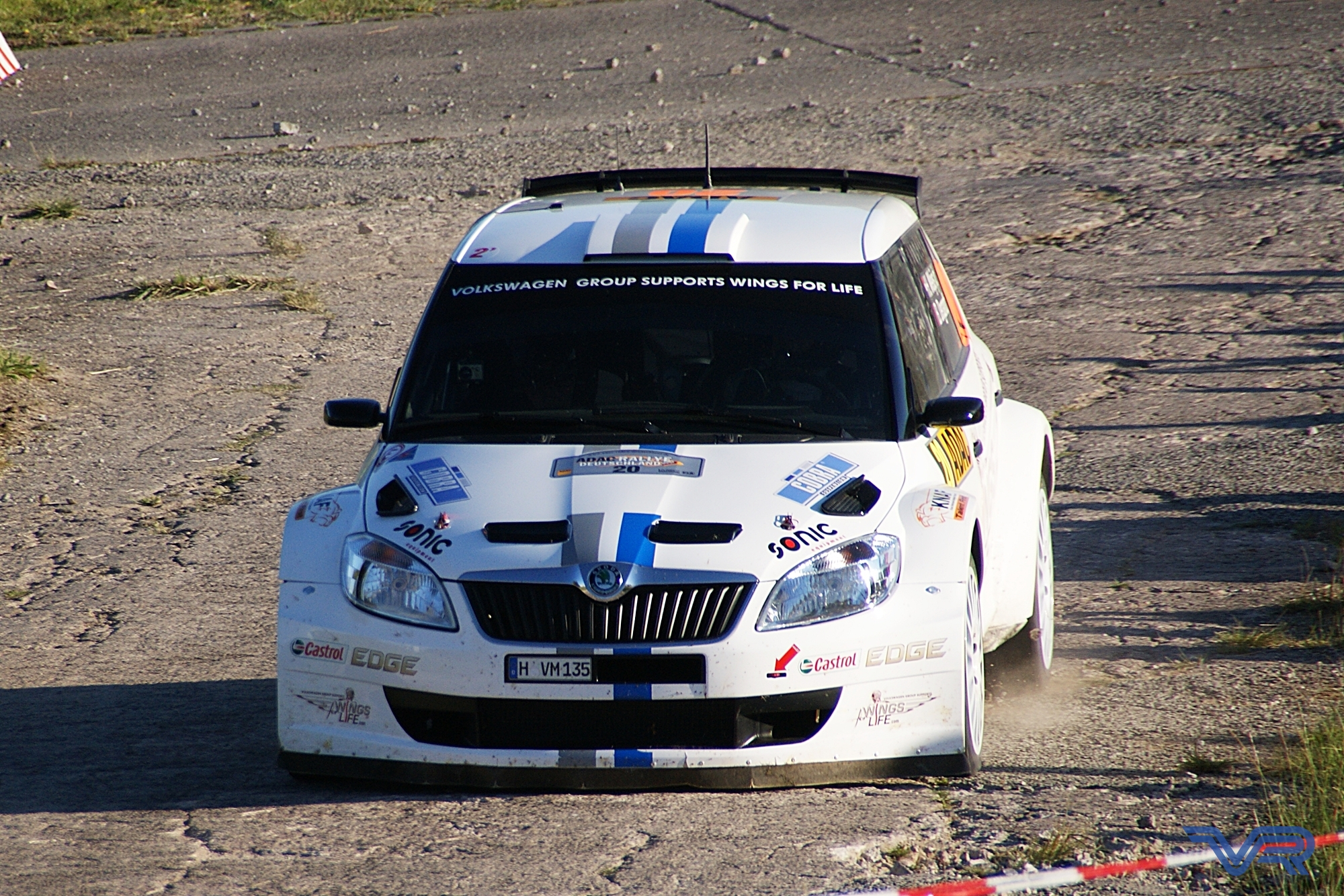

Personal information
- Nationality: (Netherlands) Dutch
- Born: December 19, 1986 (age 39); Elst, Netherlands

World Rally Championship record
- Years active: 2006–2013
- Co-driver: (Netherlands) John Raven (Netherlands) Hans van Goor (Belgium) Bjorn Degandt
- Teams: KNAF Talent First
- Rallies: 28
- Championships: 0
- Rally wins: 0
- Podiums: 0
- Stage wins: 0
- Total points: 0
- First rally: 2006 Rallye Deutschland
- Last rally: 2013 Wales Rally GB

Hans Weijs Jr. (born 19 December 1986) is a Dutch rally driver. He has won two rounds of the Junior World Rally Championship, finishing runner-up in the standings in 2010.

Weijs' father, Hans Weijs, Sr., is also a rally driver and runs his own garage in Elst.

== Career ==
In 2004, Weijs entered for a selection day of KNAF Talent First, a program run by the Dutch national motorsport federation to find and support new young talent, which he won.

Weijs made his debut in the World Rally Championship in 2006, on Rallye Deutschland, in a Mitsubishi Lancer Evo VIII, finishing in 39th position. He also finished Wales Rally GB in a Ford Fiesta ST. 2007 saw Weijs enter six rounds of the WRC in an Evo IX.

Weijs entered the Junior World Rally Championship (JWRC) in 2008 in a Citroën C2 R2 Max with the continued support of KNAF Talent First programme. He scored two points in his first season, finishing 17th in the final standings. 2009 saw considerable improvement in results after switching to a more competitive C2 S1600. He finished third in JWRC on Rally de Portugal, and won at the end of the year on Rally Catalunya. He finished the season fifth in the standings.

In 2010, Weijs won in Germany and scored two further podiums prior to the final round of the season in Catalunya. Weijs led on the final day of the rally, which would have seen him beat Aaron Burkart to the title. However, a crank sensor failure dropped him to third, which allowed Burkart, who finished the rally fourth, to win the title.

Weijs finished Second on his Super 2000 debut on the Ypres Rally, a round of the Intercontinental Rally Challenge in a Škoda Fabia S2000.

In 2012, Weijs competed in the South African Rally Championship, running for the South African Volkswagen Rally team in a Volkswagen Polo S2000

== Career results ==
=== Complete WRC results ===
Year	Entrant	Car	1	2	3	4	5	6	7	8	9	10	11	12	13	14	15	16	Pos.	Points
2006	Hans Weijs Jr.	Mitsubishi Lancer Evolution VIII	MON	SWE	MEX	ESP	FRA	ARG	ITA	GRE	GER; 39	FIN	JPN	CYP	TUR	AUS	NZL		NC	0
2006	Hans Weijs Jr.	Ford Fiesta ST																GBR; 60	NC	0
2007	Hans Weijs Jr.	Mitsubishi Lancer Evolution IX	MON	SWE	NOR	MEX	POR	ARG	ITA; 27	GRE			NZL		FRA	JPN	IRE; 32	GBR; 31	NC	0
2007	Hans Weijs Jr.	Mitsubishi Lancer Evolution VIII									FIN; Ret								NC	0
2007	Knaf Talent First	Mitsubishi Lancer Evolution IX										GER; 22		ESP; 31					NC	0
2008	Knaf Talent First	Citroën C2 R2	MON	SWE	MEX	ARG	JOR; Ret	ITA; 27	GRE	TUR	FIN; 40	GER; Ret	NZL		FRA; 37	JPN	GBR		NC	0
2008	Knaf Talent First	Citroën C2 R2 Max												ESP; Ret					NC	0
2009	Knaf Talent First	Citroën C2 S1600	IRE; Ret	NOR	CYP	POR; 22	ARG	ITA; 21	GRE	POL; 17	FIN; 43	AUS	ESP; 12	GBR					NC	0
2010	Knaf Talent First	Citroën C2 S1600	SWE	MEX	JOR	TUR	NZL	POR; Ret	BUL; 14	FIN	GER; 22	JPN	FRA; 24	ESP; 18	GBR				NC	0
2011	Volkswagen Motorsport	Škoda Fabia S2000	SWE	MEX	POR	JOR	ITA	ARG	GRE	FIN	GER; 13	AUS	FRA	ESP	GBR				NC	0
2012	Qatar World Rally Team	Citroën DS3 WRC	MON	SWE	MEX	POR	ARG	GRE	NZL	FIN	GER	GBR	FRA	ITA	ESP; Ret				NC	0
2013	Hans Weijs	Citroën DS3 R3T	MON	SWE	MEX	POR	ARG	GRE	ITA	FIN	GER	AUS	FRA	ESP	GBR; 17				NC	0

=== JWRC results ===
Year	Entrant	Car	1	2	3	4	5	6	7	8	Pos.	Points
2008	Knaf Talent First	Citroën C2 R2	MEX	JOR; Ret	ITA; 8	FIN; 8	GER; Ret		FRA; 12		17th	2
2008	Knaf Talent First	Citroën C2 R2 Max						ESP; Ret			17th	2
2009	Knaf Talent First	Citroën C2 S1600	IRE; Ret	CYP	POR; 3	ARG	ITA; 6	POL; 4	FIN; 7	ESP; 1	5th	26
2010	Knaf Talent First	Citroën C2 S1600	TUR	POR; Ret	BUL; 2	GER; 1	FRA; 2	ESP; 3			2nd	76
