= Urmo Aava =

Estonian rally driver (born 1979)

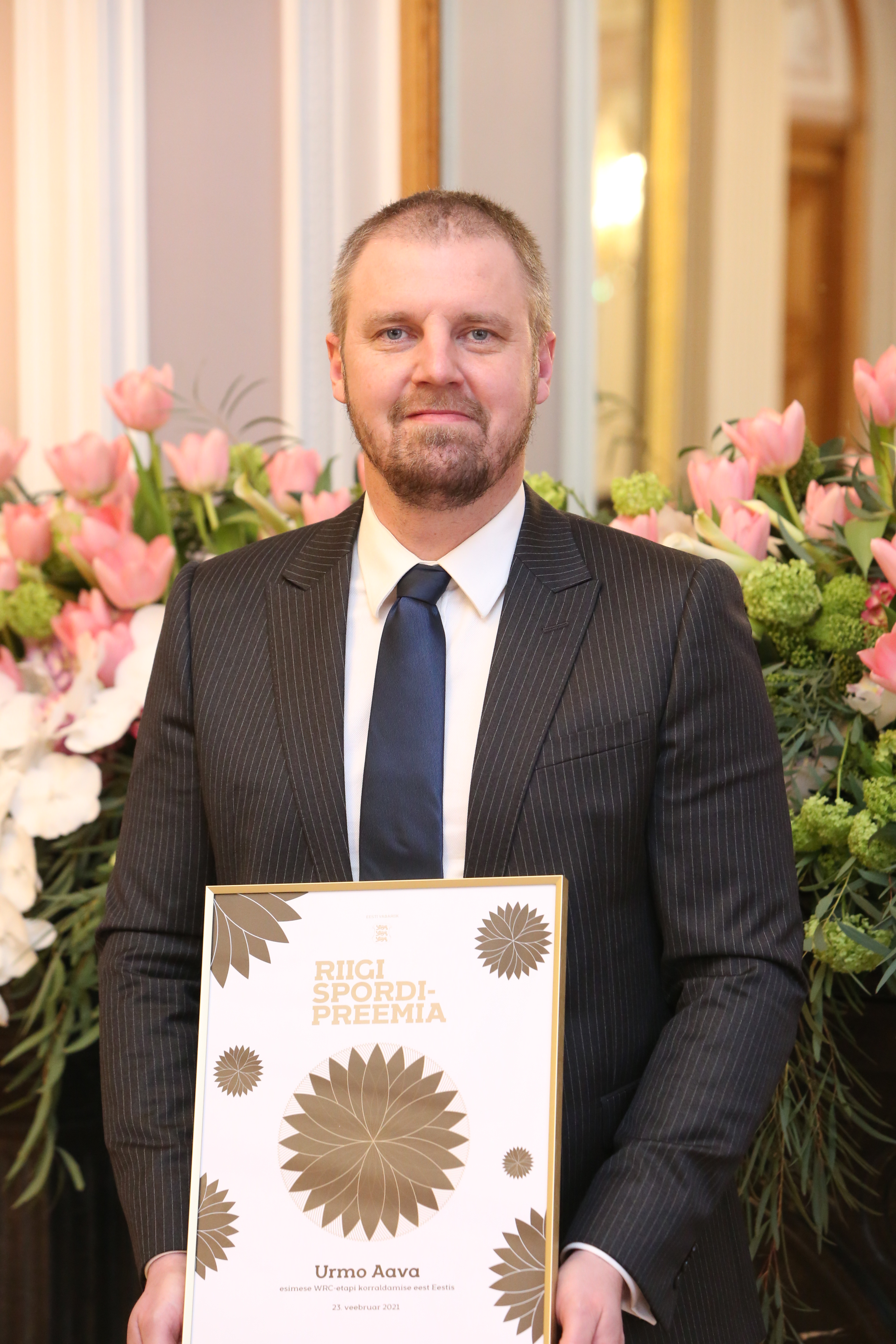
- Aava in 2021

Personal information
- Nationality: (Estonia) Estonian
- Born: 2 February 1979 (age 47); Tallinn, then part of Estonian SSR, Soviet Union

World Rally Championship record
- Years active: 2002–2009
- Co-driver: (Estonia) Toomas Kitsing (Estonia) Kuldar Sikk
- Teams: World Rally Team Estonia, Stobart Ford
- Rallies: 51
- Championships: 0
- Rally wins: 0
- Podiums: 0
- Stage wins: 5
- Total points: 17
- First rally: 2002 Rally Finland
- Last rally: 2009 Rally Finland

Urmo Aava (born 2 February 1979) is a former Estonian rally driver who competed in the World Rally Championship between 2002 and 2009. His regular co-driver was Kuldar Sikk, who later became Ott Tänak's co-driver.

== Career ==
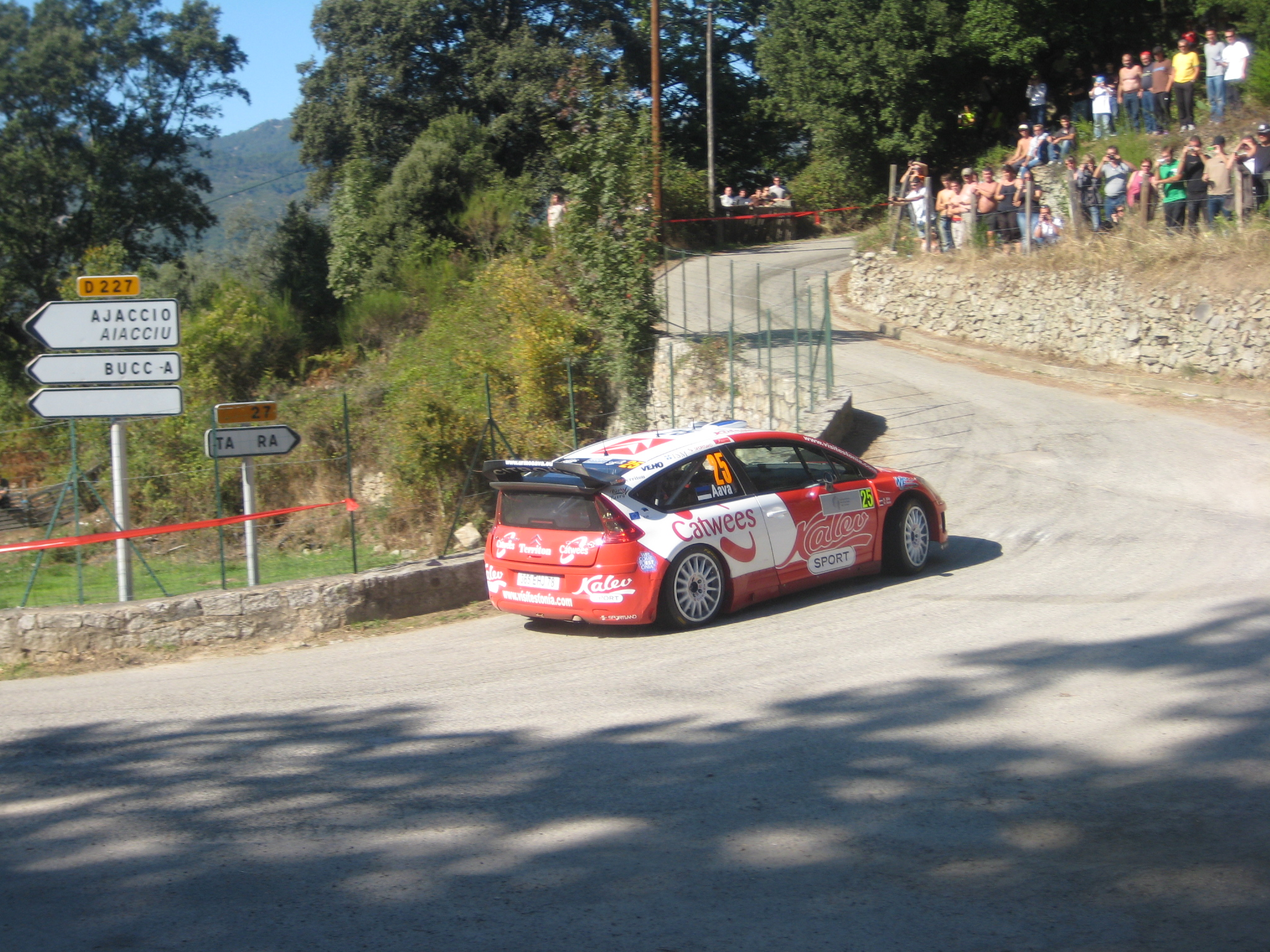
Aava driving Citroën C4 WRC in 2008.

Aava spent five years from 2003 in the Junior World Rally Championship driving for the successful Suzuki Junior World Rally Team. In this time his results improved, culminating in two runner-up positions in the final standings of the JWRC in 2006 and 2007. 2007 also saw sporadic outings in a privately run Mitsubishi Lancer WRC. In two of these events (Finland and New Zealand), he scored points.

For the 2008 season, Aava has negotiated a deal to compete ten rounds in a Citroën C4 WRC car under the name 'World Rally Team Estonia' and with support from Citroën Sport Technologies. Aava showed promise in 2008 Jordan Rally, when he was running in fifth place before mechanical problems on the final day forced him to retire. Sardinia saw a steady run to eighth place and Aava's first points of the season. The next rally in Greece was even better. Two stage wins (helped by a favourable road position) demonstrated his pace and a fourth-place resulted – his best WRC result to date. This was followed by a fifth place at New Zealand's rally.

== WRC results ==
Year	Entrant	Car	1	2	3	4	5	6	7	8	9	10	11	12	13	14	15	16	WDC	Points
2002	Urmo Aava	Ford Focus RS WRC	MON	SWE	FRA	ESP	CYP	ARG	GRE	KEN	FIN; Ret	GER	ITA	NZL	AUS	GBR			–	0
2003	Urmo Aava	Suzuki Ignis S1600	MON; 20	SWE	TUR; Ret	NZL	ARG	GRE; 19	CYP	GER	FIN; 25	AUS	ITA; Ret	FRA	ESP; 24	GBR; Ret			–	0
2004	Urmo Aava	Suzuki Ignis S1600	MON; 12	SWE	MEX	NZL	CYP	GRE; Ret	TUR; 16	ARG	FIN; 23	GER	JPN	GBR; Ret	ITA; Ret	FRA	ESP; Ret	AUS	–	0
2005	Urmo Aava	Suzuki Ignis S1600	MON; Ret	SWE	MEX	NZL	ITA; 19	CYP	TUR	GRE; 19	ARG	FIN; 16	GER; Ret	GBR	JPN	FRA; 19	ESP; 21	AUS	–	0
2006	Urmo Aava	Suzuki Swift S1600	MON	SWE; 22	MEX	ESP	FRA; 17	ARG	ITA; 18	GRE	GER	FIN; DSQ	JPN	CYP	TUR; 16	AUS	NZL	GBR; 42	–	0
2007	Urmo Aava	Suzuki Swift S1600	MON	SWE	NOR; 28	MEX	POR; 15	ARG	ITA; 13			GER; 12		ESP; 18	FRA; Ret	JPN; 15	IRE	GBR	19th	3
2007	Urmo Aava	Mitsubishi Lancer WRC05								GRE; 14	FIN; 7		NZL; 8						19th	3
2008	World Rally Team Estonia	Citroën C4 WRC	MON	SWE; 18	MEX	ARG	JOR; Ret	ITA; 8	GRE; 4	TUR; Ret	FIN; 15	GER; 8	NZL; 5	ESP; Ret	FRA; 7	JPN	GBR		11th	13
2009	Stobart VK M-Sport Ford Rally Team	Ford Focus RS WRC 08	IRE; 10	NOR; 8	CYP	POR	ARG	ITA	GRE	POL									19th	1
2009	Urmo Aava	Honda Civic Type-R R3									FIN; 29	AUS	ESP	GBR					19th	1

=== JWRC results ===
Year	Entrant	Car	1	2	3	4	5	6	7	8	9	Pos.	Points
2003	Urmo Aava	Suzuki Ignis S1600	MON; 4	TUR; Ret	GRE; 3	FIN; 4	ITA; Ret	ESP; 5	GBR; Ret			4th	20
2004	Urmo Aava	Suzuki Ignis S1600	MON; 2	GRE; Ret	TUR; 5	FIN; 5	GBR; Ret	ITA; Ret	ESP; Ret			8th	16
2005	Urmo Aava	Suzuki Ignis S1600	MON; Ret	MEX	ITA; 2	GRE; 3	FIN; 2	GER; Ret	FRA; 4	ESP; 4		4th	32
2006	Urmo Aava	Suzuki Swift S1600	SWE; 3	ESP	FRA; 2	ARG	ITA; 3	GER	FIN; DSQ	TUR; 1	GBR; 9	2nd	31
2007	Urmo Aava	Suzuki Swift S1600	NOR; 3	POR; 2	ITA; 1	FIN	GER; 2	ESP; 3	FRA; Ret			2nd	38
