= 2008 World Rally Championship =

36th season of the FIA World Rally Championship

Champions
- World Drivers' Champion: Sébastien Loeb
- World Manufacturers' Champion: Citroën

Seasons
- ← 2007 2009 →

The 2008 World Rally Championship was the 36th season of the FIA World Rally Championship. The season consisted of 15 rallies and began on 24 January, with the 2008 Monte Carlo Rally. Frenchman Sébastien Loeb successfully retained the Drivers' World Championship, his and co-driver Daniel Elena's record-breaking fifth consecutive title, all of them attained driving Citroëns. In addition, Citroën secured their fourth Manufacturers' title, and their first since 2005, from 2006 and 2007 victors, Ford.

Sébastien Loeb and co-driver Daniel Elena won a record-breaking fifth WRC championship.

== Rule changes ==
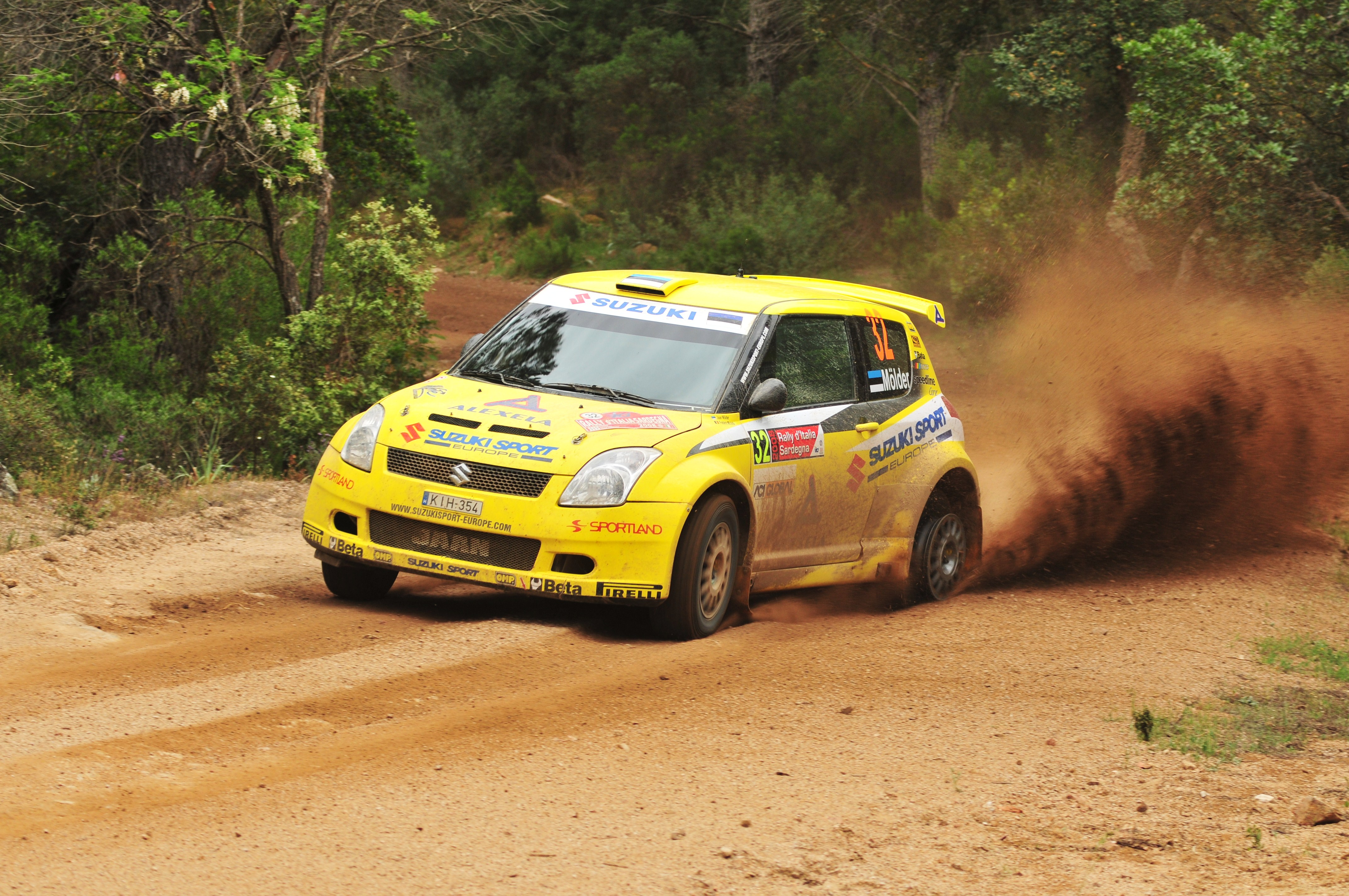
The banning of tyre mousse made punctures much more common (pictured Jaan Mölder with a rear wheel puncture in Italy).

The running order for the first day is governed by championship position, with the championship leader running first on the road. For every other day of a rally, the order is decided by the previous end of day classification (with the leader on classification running first). The term 'leg' has been replaced by 'day' in order to sound more understandable. Extra 10-minute service prior to the finish podium has been added, intended to allow the service park to remain an attraction until the end of the event.

With the switch to Pirelli tyres, tyre mousse (along with all anti-deflation devices) has been banned, and fewer compounds are available. Also the teams aren't allowed to modify tyres by themselves (e.g. by making additional cuts) anymore. At the first event of the season, the available tires were the soft slick DS tire (Pirelli PZero), the WX snow tire without studs, and the WX snow tire with studs (both variants of Pirelli Sottozero). The same snow tyres were used in Sweden as well. Later on loose surface tyres were introduced: Pirelli Scorpion, available in two variants – hard compound for abrasive surfaces, such as roads in Mexico or Greece, and soft one, for more muddy stages as seen on Welsh event. Tire walls have been strengthened in order to endure long, rough gravel stages often full of sharp rocks. The tread on Scorpions is asymmetric and directional, as it has proven more efficient during the tests.

== Calendar ==
The 2008 championship was contested over fifteen rounds in Europe, the Middle East, Asia, the Americas and Oceania.

Rd.	Start date	Finish date	Rally	Rally headquarters	Surface	Stages	Distance	Support class
1	24 January	27 January	(Monaco) 76th Rallye Automobile Monte-Carlo	Valence, Drôme, France	Mixed	19	365.09 km	None
2	8 February	10 February	(Sweden) 57th Uddeholm Swedish Rally	Karlstad, Värmland County	Snow	20	340.24 km	PWRC
3	28 February	2 March	5th Corona Rally Mexico	León, Guanajuato	Gravel	20	353.75 km	JWRC
4	27 March	30 March	28th Rally Argentina	Carlos Paz, Córdoba	Gravel	21	347.91 km	PWRC
5	24 April	27 April	1st Jordan Rally	Amman	Gravel	22	359.26 km	JWRC
6	16 May	18 May	(Italy) 5th Rally d'Italia Sardinia	Olbia, Sardinia	Gravel	17	344.73 km	JWRC
7	29 May	1 June	55th BP Ultimate Acropolis Rally of Greece	Tatoi, Northern Attica	Gravel	20	331.52 km	PWRC
8	13 June	15 June	9th Rally of Turkey	Kemer, Antalya Province	Gravel	19	360.12 km	PWRC
9	31 July	3 August	58th Neste Oil Rally Finland	Jyväskylä, Central Finland	Gravel	24	340.42 km	PWRC/JWRC
10	15 August	17 August	(Germany) 27th ADAC Rallye Deutschland	Trier, Rhineland-Palatinate	Tarmac	19	352.63 km	JWRC
11	28 August	31 August	39th Repco Rally New Zealand	Hamilton, Waikato	Gravel	18	353.04 km	PWRC
12	2 October	5 October	(Spain) 44th RallyRACC Catalunya - Costa Daurada	Salou, Catalonia	Tarmac	18	353.62 km	JWRC
13	10 October	12 October	52nd Tour de Corse - Rallye de France	Ajaccio, Corsica	Tarmac	16	359.02 km	JWRC
14	31 October	2 November	8th Pioneer Carrozzeria Rally Japan	Sapporo, Hokkaido	Gravel	29	343.69 km	PWRC
15	5 December	7 December	(United Kingdom) 64th Wales Rally GB	Cardiff, Wales	Gravel	19	282.35 km	PWRC

=== Calendar changes ===
The 2008 season included 15 rallies, which was one less than the 2007 season. Rally Norway, Rally Portugal and Rally Ireland were dropped from the calendar for 2008. Rally of Turkey returned to the schedule, and Jordan Rally was part of the calendar for the first time. Rally Australia was planned to make a return after being absent in 2007, but the organizers submitted a request to the FIA to delay the event's return to the schedule until 2009.

The events also part of the Production World Rally Championship were Sweden, Argentina, Greece, Turkey, Finland, New Zealand, Japan and GB. The seven rallies also on the Junior World Rally Championship schedule were Mexico, Jordan, Italy, Finland, Germany, Spain and France.

== Teams and drivers ==
In 2008 two categories are valid to compete for the Manufacturer's championship:

Manufacturer (M)

- must take part in all the rallies of the Championship with two cars of the same make
- must enter only cars corresponding to the latest homologated version of a World Rally Car in conformity with the 2008 Appendix J
- must inform the FIA of the name of the first driver entered for the season at the time of registration for the Championship. No change of the first driver is authorised, except in a case of force majeure. The driver of the second car may be changed for each of the rallies in the Championship

Manufacturer Team (MT)

- must take part in a minimum of 10 Championship rallies with two cars of the same make; those rallies must be nominated on registering for the Championship
- cannot enter World Rally Cars homologated during the year 2008 and cannot use parts homologated after 2 January 2008
- can only score points in the events it nominated on registering.

The teams and drivers for the 2008 season are as follows:

All teams ran Pirelli tyres.

World Rally Car entries eligible to score manufacturer points
Manufacturer	Car	Team	Tyre	No	Drivers	Co-drivers	Rounds
Citroën	C4 WRC	(France) Citroën Total World Rally Team	P	1	(France) Sébastien Loeb	(Monaco) Daniel Elena	All
Citroën	C4 WRC	(France) Citroën Total World Rally Team	P	2	(Spain) Daniel Sordo	(Spain) Marc Marti	All
Ford	Focus RS WRC 07 1-9; Focus RS WRC 08 10-15	(United Kingdom) BP Ford Abu Dhabi World Rally Team	P	3	(Finland) Mikko Hirvonen	(Finland) Jarmo Lehtinen	All
Ford	Focus RS WRC 07 1-9; Focus RS WRC 08 10-15	(United Kingdom) BP Ford Abu Dhabi World Rally Team	P	4	(Finland) Jari-Matti Latvala	(Finland) Miikka Anttila	1–11, 14–15
Ford	Focus RS WRC 07 1-9; Focus RS WRC 08 10-15	(United Kingdom) BP Ford Abu Dhabi World Rally Team	P	4	(Belgium) François Duval	(France) Patrick Pivato	12–13
Subaru	Impreza WRC2007 1-6; Impreza WRC2008 7-15	(Japan) Subaru World Rally Team	P	5	(Norway) Petter Solberg	(United Kingdom) Phil Mills	All
Subaru	Impreza WRC2007 1-6; Impreza WRC2008 7-15	(Japan) Subaru World Rally Team	P	6	(Australia) Chris Atkinson	(Belgium) Stéphane Prévot	All
Suzuki	SX4 WRC	(Japan) Suzuki World Rally Team	P	11	(Finland) Toni Gardemeister	(Finland) Tomi Tuominen	All
Suzuki	SX4 WRC	(Japan) Suzuki World Rally Team	P	12	(Sweden) Per-Gunnar Andersson	(Sweden) Jonas Andersson	All
World Rally Car entries eligible to score manufacturer team points
Ford	Focus RS WRC 07	(United Kingdom) Stobart VK M-Sport Ford Rally Team	P	7	(Italy) Gianluigi Galli	(Italy) Giovanni Bernacchini	1–10
Ford	Focus RS WRC 07	(United Kingdom) Stobart VK M-Sport Ford Rally Team	P	7	(Belgium) François Duval	(France) Patrick Pivato	11, 14
Ford	Focus RS WRC 07	(United Kingdom) Stobart VK M-Sport Ford Rally Team	P	7	(Belgium) François Duval	(France) Denis Giraudet	15
Ford	Focus RS WRC 07	(United Kingdom) Stobart VK M-Sport Ford Rally Team	P	7	(United Kingdom) Matthew Wilson	(United Kingdom) Scott Martin	12–13
Ford	Focus RS WRC 07	(United Kingdom) Stobart VK M-Sport Ford Rally Team	P	8	(Belgium) François Duval	(Belgium) Eddy Chevaillier	1
Ford	Focus RS WRC 07	(United Kingdom) Stobart VK M-Sport Ford Rally Team	P	8	(Belgium) François Duval	(France) Patrick Pivato	10
Ford	Focus RS WRC 07	(United Kingdom) Stobart VK M-Sport Ford Rally Team	P	8	(Norway) Henning Solberg	(Norway) Cato Menkerud	2, 4–5, 7–9
Ford	Focus RS WRC 07	(United Kingdom) Stobart VK M-Sport Ford Rally Team	P	8	(United Kingdom) Matthew Wilson	(United Kingdom) Scott Martin	3, 6, 11, 14–15
Ford	Focus RS WRC 07	(United Kingdom) Stobart VK M-Sport Ford Rally Team	P	8	(Finland) Jari-Matti Latvala	(Finland) Miikka Anttila	12–13
Ford	Focus RS WRC 07	(Argentina) Munchi's Ford World Rally Team	P	9	(Argentina) Federico Villagra	(Argentina) Jorge Pérez Companc	3–9, 11–12, 14
Ford	Focus RS WRC 07	(Argentina) Munchi's Ford World Rally Team	P	10	(Norway) Henning Solberg	(Norway) Cato Menkerud	3, 6, 11–12, 14
Ford	Focus RS WRC 07	(Argentina) Munchi's Ford World Rally Team	P	10	(Argentina) Luís Pérez Companc	(Argentina) Jose Maria Volta	4, 9
Ford	Focus RS WRC 07	(Argentina) Munchi's Ford World Rally Team	P	10	(United Kingdom) Barry Clark	(Argentina) José Díaz	5
Ford	Focus RS WRC 07	(Argentina) Munchi's Ford World Rally Team	P	10	(United Kingdom) Barry Clark	(Republic of Ireland) Paul Nagle	8
Ford	Focus RS WRC 07	(Argentina) Munchi's Ford World Rally Team	P	10	(Greece) Armodios Vovos	(Greece) Loris Meletopoulos	7

World Rally Car entries ineligible to score manufacturer points
Manufacturer	Car	Team	Tire	Drivers	Co-drivers	Rounds
Citroën	C4 WRC	World Rally Team Estonia	P	(Estonia) Urmo Aava	(Estonia) Kuldar Sikk	2, 5–13, 15
Citroën	C4 WRC	Equipe de France FFSA	P	(France) Sébastien Ogier	(France) Julien Ingrassia	15
Citroën	C4 WRC	(Zimbabwe) Conrad Rautenbach	P	(Zimbabwe) Conrad Rautenbach	(United Kingdom) David Senior	3–15
Citroën	Xsara WRC	(Zimbabwe) Conrad Rautenbach	P	(Zimbabwe) Conrad Rautenbach	(United Kingdom) David Senior	1–2
Ford	Focus RS WRC 07	(United Kingdom) BP Ford Abu Dhabi World Rally Team	P	(United Arab Emirates) Khalid Al Qassimi	(United Kingdom) Michael Orr	1–2, 5–7, 9–10, 12–13, 15
Ford	Focus RS WRC 07	(United Kingdom) Stobart VK M-Sport Ford Rally Team	P	(Norway) Henning Solberg	(Norway) Cato Menkerud	1, 10, 13, 15
Ford	Focus RS WRC 07	(United Kingdom) Stobart VK M-Sport Ford Rally Team	P	(United Kingdom) Matthew Wilson	(United Kingdom) Scott Martin	1, 4–5, 7–10
Ford	Focus RS WRC 07	(United Kingdom) Stobart VK M-Sport Ford Rally Team	P	(United Kingdom) Barry Clark	(Republic of Ireland) Paul Nagle	13, 15
Ford	Focus RS WRC 07	(United Kingdom) Stobart VK M-Sport Ford Rally Team	P	(Italy) Valentino Rossi	(Italy) Carlo Cassina	15
Ford	Focus RS WRC 04	(United Kingdom) Stobart VK M-Sport Ford Rally Team	P	(United Kingdom) Steve Perez	(United Kingdom) Paul Spooner	15
Ford	Focus RS WRC 04	(United Kingdom) Stobart VK M-Sport Ford Rally Team	P	(United Kingdom) Dave Weston Jr.	(United Kingdom) Aled Davies	15
Ford	Focus RS WRC 07	(Netherlands) Van Merksteijn Motorsport		(Netherlands) Peter van Merksteijn Sr.	(Netherlands) Erwin Berkhof	12
Ford	Focus RS WRC 07	(Netherlands) Van Merksteijn Motorsport		(Netherlands) Peter van Merksteijn Sr.	(Netherlands) Hilco van Beek	10
Ford	Focus RS WRC 06	(Netherlands) Van Merksteijn Motorsport	P	(Netherlands) Peter van Merksteijn Sr.	(Netherlands) Hilco van Beek	10
Ford	Focus RS WRC 06	(Netherlands) Van Merksteijn Motorsport	P	(Netherlands) Peter van Merksteijn Sr.	(Netherlands) Hilco van Beek	2, 6
Ford	Focus RS WRC 06	(Netherlands) Van Merksteijn Motorsport	P	(Netherlands) Peter van Merksteijn Jr.	(Belgium) Eddy Chevaillier	10, 12
Ford	Focus RS WRC 06	(United Kingdom) Ramsport	P	(Norway) Andreas Mikkelsen	(Norway) Ola Fløene	2, 8–10, 12–13
Ford	Focus RS WRC 07	(United Kingdom) Ramsport	P	(Norway) Andreas Mikkelsen	(Sweden) Maria Andersson	6
Ford	Focus RS WRC 06	(United Kingdom) Ramsport	P	(Finland) Matti Rantanen	(Finland) Jan Lönegren	9
Ford	Focus RS WRC 06	(Netherlands) Ipatec Racing	P	(Netherlands) René Kuipers	(Belgium) Erwin Mombaerts	10
Ford	Focus RS WRC 06	(Netherlands) Ipatec Racing	P	(Netherlands) Dennis Kuipers	(Netherlands) Kees Hagman	10
Ford	Focus RS WRC 06	(Netherlands) Erik Wevers	P	(Netherlands) Erik Wevers	(Netherlands) Jalmar van Weeren	10
Ford	Focus RS WRC 04	(Finland) Clo Racing	P	(Finland) Jouni Arolainen	(Finland) Risto Pietiläinen	9
Peugeot	307 WRC	(France) Team Rallye Cuoq	P	(France) Jean-Marie Cuoq	(France) Philippe Janvier	1
Peugeot	307 WRC	(France) Laurent Carbonaro	P	(France) Laurent Carbonaro	(France) Marc-Emilien Choudey	1
Peugeot	307 WRC	(France) Armando Pereira		(France) Armando Pereira	(France) Antoine Paque	13
Peugeot	307 WRC	(France) José Micheli	P	(France) José Micheli	(France) Virginie Dejoye	13
Peugeot	206 WRC	(France) Frédéric Romeyer	P	(France) Frédéric Romeyer	(France) Thomas Fournel	1
Peugeot	206 WRC	(Mexico) Triviño Racing		(Mexico) Ricardo Triviño	(Spain) Sergio Salom	3
Peugeot	206 WRC	(Spain) Escuderia Osona	P	(Spain) Albert Orriols	(Spain) Lluis Pujolar	12
Peugeot	206 WRC	(France) Alain Vauthier	P	(France) Alain Vauthier	(France) Gaëtan Houssin	13
Peugeot	206 WRC	(France) Georges Guebey		(France) Georges Guebey	(France) Nadège Passaquin	13
Škoda	Fabia WRC	(Netherlands) Harry Kleinjan	P	(Netherlands) Harry Kleinjan	(Netherlands) Annemieke Hulzebos	10
Škoda	Octavia WRC Evo3	(Italy) Errani Team	P	(Italy) Riccardo Errani	(Italy) Stefano Casadio	1
Škoda	Octavia WRC Evo3	(Finland) Jukka Metsälä		(Finland) Jukka Metsälä	(Finland) Sari Ohra-Aho	9
Subaru	Impreza WRC2008	(Japan) Subaru World Rally Team	P	(France) Brice Tirabassi	(France) Fabrice Gordon	12–13
Subaru	Impreza WRC2007	(Norway) Adapta World Rally Team	P	(Norway) Mads Østberg	(Norway) Ole Kristian Unnerud	2, 6–7, 9–10, 12–13, 15
Subaru	Impreza WRC2007	(Republic of Ireland) Eamonn Boland		(Republic of Ireland) Eamonn Boland	(Republic of Ireland) Michael Joseph Morrissey	12, 15
Subaru	Impreza WRC2007	(United Kingdom) Gareth Jones	P	(United Kingdom) Gareth Jones	(Republic of Ireland) David Moynihan	10
Subaru	Impreza WRC2007	(United Kingdom) Gareth Jones	P	(United Kingdom) Gareth Jones	(United Kingdom) Clive Jenkins	12–13, 15
Subaru	Impreza WRC2007	(Netherlands) Mark van Eldik	P	(Netherlands) Mark van Eldik	(Netherlands) Michel Groenewoud	10
Subaru	Impreza WRC2001	(Spain) Escuderia Motor Terrassa		(Spain) Joan Ollé	(Spain) Nicolas del Corral	12
Subaru	Impreza WRC2005	(France) François Padrona		(France) François Padrona	(France) Jean-François Mancini	13

=== Team and driver changes ===
Suzuki made their full season debut in the WRC after a part time campaign in 2007. Their drivers were reigning JWRC champion Per-Gunnar Andersson and Toni Gardemeister.

Kronos left the WRC after the 2007 season to focus on running Peugeot Team Belux in the Intercontinental Rally Challenge.

Marcus Grönholm retired from the WRC after the 2007 season. He was replaced by Jari-Matti Latvala who had driven for Stobart VK M-Sport Ford Rally Team the previous season. Latvala himself was replaced by Gianlugi Galli at Stobart. The second Stobart seat was shared between 2007 drivers Matthew Wilson and Henning Solberg although the Norwegian would sometimes be nominated to score points for Munchi’s Ford.

François Duval was given a one off drive Stobart VK M-Sport in Monte Carlo as a tarmac specialist. He was given another one off drive in Germany. After Gianlugi Galli broke his left femur in a crash, Duval would replace Galli from New Zealand onwards, despite Marcus Grönholm being initially offered the drive. Duval would be promoted to the main Ford team for the remaining two Tarmac rallies in France and Spain, replacing the struggling Latvala.

2007 Ford Fiesta Sporting Trophy winner Barry Clark was signed by Ford on a part time campaign where he would participate in four events with Stobart and Munchi’s.

Subaru had planned to run a third full time car for Xavier Pons, but the deal fell through before the Monte Carlo Rally.

=== J-WRC entries ===
No	Drivers	Co-driver	Car	Rounds
31	(Czech Republic) Martin Prokop	(Czech Republic) Jan Tománek	Citroën C2 S1600	3, 6, 9–10, 12–13
32	(Estonia) Jaan Mölder	(Belgium) Frédéric Miclotte	Suzuki Swift S1600	3, 5–6, 9, 12–13
33	(Germany) Aaron Burkart	(Germany) Michael Kölbach	Citroën C2 S1600	3, 6, 9–10, 12–13
34	(Italy) Andrea Cortinovis	(Italy) Giancarla Guzzi	Renault Clio S1600	5–6, 9–10, 12–13
35	(Poland) Michał Kościuszko	(Poland) Maciek Szczepaniak	Suzuki Swift S1600	3, 5–6, 9, 12–13
36	(Lithuania) Vilius Rožukas	(Lithuania) Andrius Šošas	Citroën C2 S1600	5–6
37	(Italy) Simone Bertolotti	(Italy) Daniele Vernuccio	Renault Clio R3	5–6, 9–10, 12–13
38	(Italy) Francesco Fanari	(Italy) Massimiliano Bosi	Citroën C2 R2	3, 5–6, 10
38	(Italy) Francesco Fanari	(Italy) Dario Andrian	Citroën C2 R2	9
38	(Italy) Francesco Fanari	(Italy) Daniele Benedetti	Citroën C2 R2	12
39	(Italy) Stefano Albertini	(Italy) Piercarlo Capolongo	Renault Clio R3	5–6, 9–10, 12–13
40	(Serbia) Miloš Komljenović	(Serbia) Aleksandar Jeremić	Renault Clio R3	3, 5–6, 9
40	(United Kingdom) Kris Meeke	(United Kingdom) Chris Patterson	Renault Clio R3	12
40	(France) Arnaud Augoyard	(France) Nicolas Baudin	Renault Clio R3	13
41	(Sweden) Patrik Sandell	(Sweden) Emil Axelsson	Renault Clio S1600	3, 5–6, 9, 12–13
42	(France) Sébastien Ogier	(France) Julien Ingrassia	Citroën C2 S1600	3, 5–6, 10, 12–13
43	(Germany) Florian Niegel	(Germany) Andre Kachel	Suzuki Swift S1600	5–6, 10, 12–13
43	(Germany) Florian Niegel	(Germany) Andre Kachel	Suzuki Swift Sport	9
44	(Netherlands) Hans Weijs, Jr.	(Netherlands) Hans van Goor	Citroën C2 R2	5–6, 9–10, 12–13
45	(Netherlands) Kevin Abbring	(Belgium) Erwin Mombaerts	Renault Clio R3	5, 9, 13
45	(Netherlands) Kevin Abbring	(Belgium) Bjorn Degandt	Renault Clio R3	6, 10, 12
46	(Republic of Ireland) Shaun Gallagher	(Republic of Ireland) Michael Morrissey	Citroën C2 S1600	3, 5–6, 10
46	(Republic of Ireland) Shaun Gallagher	(Republic of Ireland) Paul Kiely	Citroën C2 S1600	9, 12
47	(Luxembourg) Gilles Schammel	(Belgium) Renaud Jamoul	Renault Clio R3	5–6, 9–10, 12–13
48	(Italy) Alessandro Bettega	(Italy) Simone Scattolin	Renault Clio R3	5–6, 9–10, 12–13
Additional guest entries
59	(Finland) Kalle Pinomäki	(Finland) Matti Kaskinen	Suzuki Swift S1600	9
59	(Spain) Sergio Perez	(Spain) Oriol Julià	Citroën C2 S1600	12
59	(France) Pierre Campana	(France) Samuel Teissier	Renault Clio R3	13
60	(France) Pierre Marché	(France) Julien Giroux	Suzuki Swift S1600	13

=== P-WRC entries ===
No	Drivers	Co-driver	Car	Rounds
31	(Japan) Toshihiro Arai	(Australia) Glenn MacNeall	Subaru Impreza WRX STI	2, 4, 7–8, 11, 14
32	(San Marino) Mirco Baldacci	(Italy) Giovanni Agnese	Mitsubishi Lancer Evo IX	4, 7–8, 11, 14–15
33	(Czech Republic) Martin Prokop	(Czech Republic) Jan Tománek	Mitsubishi Lancer Evo IX	2, 4, 7–8, 11, 15
34	(Italy) Gianluca Linari	(Italy) Roberto Mometti	Subaru Impreza WRX STI	2
34	(Italy) Gianluca Linari	(Italy) Gianni Melani	Subaru Impreza WRX STI	4
34	(Italy) Gianluca Linari	(Italy) Paolo Gregoriani	Subaru Impreza WRX STI	7
34	(Italy) Gianluca Linari	(Italy) Barbara Perugini	Subaru Impreza WRX STI	8
34	(Italy) Gianluca Linari	(Italy) Franco Giusti	Subaru Impreza WRX STI	11
34	(Italy) Gianluca Linari	(Italy) Matteo Braga	Subaru Impreza WRX STI	14
35	(Russia) Evgeny Novikov	(Russia) Dmitry Chumak	Subaru Impreza WRX STI	4
35	(Russia) Evgeny Novikov	(Russia) Dmitry Chumak	Mitsubishi Lancer Evo IX	7
35	(Russia) Evgeny Novikov	(Russia) Evgeny Kalachev	Mitsubishi Lancer Evo IX	8
35	(Russia) Evgeny Novikov	(Australia) Dale Moscatt	Mitsubishi Lancer Evo IX	11, 14–15
36	(Norway) Eyvind Brynildsen	(France) Denis Giraudet	Mitsubishi Lancer Evo IX	2, 9, 14
36	(Norway) Eyvind Brynildsen	(Sweden) Maria Andersson	Mitsubishi Lancer Evo IX	7–8
36	(Norway) Eyvind Brynildsen	(Australia) Glenn MacNeall	Mitsubishi Lancer Evo IX	15
37	(Cyprus) Spyros Pavlides	(France) Denis Giraudet	Subaru Impreza WRX STI	4, 7, 11
37	(Cyprus) Spyros Pavlides	(United Kingdom) Steve Lancaster	Subaru Impreza WRX STI	15
37	(Sweden) Oscar Svedlund	(Sweden) Björn Nilsson	Subaru Impreza WRX STI	9
37	(Japan) Yasunori Hagiwara	(Japan) Koichi Kato	Subaru Impreza WRX STI	14
38	(Jordan) Amjad Farrah	(Italy) Nicola Arena	Mitsubishi Lancer Evo IX	4, 7–8
38	(Sweden) Patrik Flodin	(Sweden) Göran Bergsten	Mitsubishi Lancer Evo IX	9
38	(New Zealand) Stewart Taylor	(New Zealand) Warwick Searle	Mitsubishi Lancer Evo IX	11
38	(United Kingdom) Darren Gass	(United Kingdom) Neil Shanks	Mitsubishi Lancer Evo IX	15
39	(Qatar) Nasser Al-Attiyah	(United Kingdom) Chris Patterson	Subaru Impreza WRX STI	2, 4, 7–8, 11, 15
40	(Italy) Stefano Marrini	(Italy) Matteo Braga	Mitsubishi Lancer Evo IX	2, 4
40	(Italy) Stefano Marrini	(Italy) Tiziana Sandroni	Mitsubishi Lancer Evo IX	14
40	(San Marino) Loris Baldacci	(Italy) Rudy Pollet	Mitsubishi Lancer Evo IX	7, 15
40	(Italy) Riccardo Errani	(Italy) Stefano Casadio	Mitsubishi Lancer Evo IX	8
41	(Austria) Andreas Aigner	(Germany) Klaus Wicha	Mitsubishi Lancer Evo IX	2, 4, 7–8, 11, 15
42	(Portugal) Bernardo Sousa	(Portugal) Carlos Magalhães	Mitsubishi Lancer Evo IX	2, 4
42	(Portugal) Bernardo Sousa	(Portugal) Jorge Carvalho	Mitsubishi Lancer Evo IX	7–8, 11, 15
43	(Russia) Evgeny Vertunov	(Russia) Georgiy Troshkin	Subaru Impreza WRX STI	2, 7–9, 11, 14
44	(Hungary) Gábor Mayer	(Hungary) Robert Tagai	Subaru Impreza WRX STI	4, 7–8
44	(China) Liu Chao Dong	(Australia) Anthony McLoughlin	Subaru Impreza WRX STI	11
44	(Sweden) Patrik Flodin	(Sweden) Göran Bergsten	Subaru Impreza WRX STI	15
44	(Finland) Tapio Suominen	(Finland) Pasi Hedman	Mitsubishi Lancer Evo IX	9
45	(Finland) Jussi Tiippana	(Finland) Marko Salminen	Subaru Impreza WRX STI	2
45	(Slovenia) Andrej Jereb	(Slovenia) Miran Kacin	Subaru Impreza WRX STI	4, 7
45	(Italy) Francesco Trevisin	(San Marino) Alessandro Biordi	Subaru Impreza WRX STI	8
45	(Finland) Teemu Arminen	(Finland) Tuomo Nikkola	Subaru Impreza WRX STI	9, 15
46	(Finland) Jari Ketomaa	(Finland) Miika Teiskonen	Subaru Impreza WRX STI	2, 4, 7, 9, 11, 15
47	(Italy) Fabio Frisiero	(Italy) Simone Scattolin	Mitsubishi Lancer Evo IX	2, 9
47	(Italy) Giorgio Bacco	(San Marino) Silvio Stefanelli	Subaru Impreza WRX STI	4, 8
47	(Italy) Giorgio Bacco	(Italy) Fabio Pizzol	Subaru Impreza WRX STI	11
47	(Czech Republic) Jaromír Tarabus	(Czech Republic) Daniel Trunkát	Fiat Abarth Grande Punto S2000	15
48	(Russia) Evgeny Aksakov	(Estonia) Aleksander Kornilov	Mitsubishi Lancer Evo IX	2, 4, 7–9, 15
49	(Italy) Simone Campedelli	(Italy) Danilo Fappani	Mitsubishi Lancer Evo IX	2, 4, 7–9, 15
50	(Portugal) Armindo Araújo	(Portugal) Miguel Ramalho	Mitsubishi Lancer Evo IX	2, 7–8, 11, 14–15
51	(Indonesia) Subhan Aksa	(Indonesia) Hendrik Mboi	Mitsubishi Lancer Evo VII	2, 4
51	(Indonesia) Subhan Aksa	(Indonesia) Hendrik Mboi	Mitsubishi Lancer Evo IX	7, 9, 11, 14
52	(Finland) Juho Hänninen	(Finland) Mikko Markkula	Mitsubishi Lancer Evo IX	2, 7, 9, 11, 14–15
53	(Germany) Uwe Nittel	(Germany) Detlef Ruf	Mitsubishi Lancer Evo IX	2, 4
53	(Germany) Uwe Nittel	(Germany) Michael Wenzel	Mitsubishi Lancer Evo IX	7–8
53	(Italy) Giovanni Manfrinato	(Italy) Carlo Pisano	Mitsubishi Lancer Evo IX	9, 15
54	(United States) Travis Pastrana	(United Kingdom) Derek Ringer	Subaru Impreza WRX STI	4, 7
54	(Finland) Jussi Tiippana	(Finland) Marko Salminen	Subaru Impreza WRX STI	9
54	(United States) Ken Block	(Italy) Alex Gelsomino	Subaru Impreza WRX STI	11
54	(Japan) Hiroshi Yanagisawa	(Japan) Osamu Yoda	Subaru Impreza WRX STI	14
54	(United Kingdom) Mark Higgins	(United Kingdom) Rory Kennedy	Subaru Impreza WRX STI	15
55	(Sweden) Patrik Sandell	(Sweden) Emil Axelsson	Peugeot 207 S2000	2, 4, 7–8, 15
55	(Sweden) Patrik Sandell	(Sweden) Emil Axelsson	Mitsubishi Lancer Evo IX	11
56	(Japan) Fumio Nutahara	(United Kingdom) Daniel Barritt	Mitsubishi Lancer Evo IX	4, 7, 9, 11, 15
56	(Japan) Fumio Nutahara	(United Kingdom) Daniel Barritt	Mitsubishi Lancer Evo X	14
57	(Estonia) Martin Rauam	(Estonia) Silver Kütt	Mitsubishi Lancer Evo IX	4, 7–8, 11, 14
57	(Estonia) Egon Kaur	(Estonia) Simo Koskinen	Subaru Impreza WRX STI	15
58	(India) Naren Kumar	(United Kingdom) Nicky Beech	Subaru Impreza WRX STI	7–9, 11, 14
58	(India) Gaurav Gill	(United Kingdom) Nicky Beech	Subaru Impreza WRX STI	15
Additional guest entries
59	(Sweden) Patrik Flodin	(Sweden) Göran Bergsten	Subaru Impreza WRX STI	2
60	(Sweden) Oscar Svedlund	(Sweden) Björn Nilsson	Subaru Impreza WRX STI	2
59	(Argentina) Marcos Ligato	(Argentina) Rubén García	Mitsubishi Lancer Evo IX	4
60	(Argentina) Sebastián Beltran	(Chile) Ricardo Rojas	Mitsubishi Lancer Evo IX	4
59	(Greece) Panayiotis Hatzitsopanis	(Greece) Andreas Andrikopoulos	Subaru Impreza WRX STI	7
60	(Greece) Lambros Athanassoulas	(Greece) Nikolaos Zakheos	Subaru Impreza WRX STI	7
159	(Finland) Juha Salo	(Finland) Mika Stenberg	Mitsubishi Lancer Evo IX	9
160	(Finland) Jussi Välimäki	(Finland) Teppo Leino	Mitsubishi Lancer Evo IX	9
59	(New Zealand) Hayden Paddon	(New Zealand) John Kennard	Mitsubishi Lancer Evo IX	11
60	(New Zealand) Chris West	(New Zealand) Garry Cowan	Mitsubishi Lancer Evo IX	11
59	(Japan) Katsuhiko Taguchi	(Australia) Mark Stacey	Mitsubishi Lancer Evo X	14
60	(Japan) Takuma Kamada	(Japan) Naoki Kase	Subaru Impreza WRX STI	14
59	(United Kingdom) David Higgins	(United Kingdom) Ieuan Thomas	Subaru Impreza WRX STI	15
60	(United Kingdom) Guy Wilks	(United Kingdom) Phil Pugh	Mitsubishi Lancer Evo IX	15

All entries utilized Pirelli tyres.

== Events ==
The Rally Finland is notable this year for having dropped its famous Ouninpohja stage. This has been done for safety reasons, however this is likely to be a huge disappointment for race fans.

Colour	Rally Surface
Gold	Gravel
Silver	Tarmac
Blue	Snow/Ice
Bronze	Mixed Surface

Round	Rally name	Podium finishers				Statistics			
Round	Rally name	Rank	Driver	Car	Time	Stages	Length	Starters	Finishers
1	(France) / (Monaco) Monte Carlo Rally (24–27 January) — Results and report	1	(France) Sébastien Loeb	Citroën C4 WRC	3:39:17.0	19	365.09 km	47	34
1	(France) / (Monaco) Monte Carlo Rally (24–27 January) — Results and report	2	(Finland) Mikko Hirvonen	Ford Focus RS WRC 07	3:41:51.4	19	365.09 km	47	34
1	(France) / (Monaco) Monte Carlo Rally (24–27 January) — Results and report	3	(Australia) Chris Atkinson	Subaru Impreza WRC2007	3:42:15.6	19	365.09 km	47	34
2	(Sweden) Swedish Rally (8–10 February) — Results and report	1	(Finland) Jari-Matti Latvala	Ford Focus RS WRC 07	2:46:41.2	20	340.24 km	61	49
2	(Sweden) Swedish Rally (8–10 February) — Results and report	2	(Finland) Mikko Hirvonen	Ford Focus RS WRC 07	2:47:39.5	20	340.24 km	61	49
2	(Sweden) Swedish Rally (8–10 February) — Results and report	3	(Italy) Gianluigi Galli	Ford Focus RS WRC 07	2:49:04.4	20	340.24 km	61	49
3	Rally Mexico (28 February– 2 March) — Results and report	1	(France) Sébastien Loeb	Citroën C4 WRC	3:33:29.9	20	353.75 km	40	28
3	Rally Mexico (28 February– 2 March) — Results and report	2	(Australia) Chris Atkinson	Subaru Impreza WRC2007	3:34:36.0	20	353.75 km	40	28
3	Rally Mexico (28 February– 2 March) — Results and report	3	(Finland) Jari-Matti Latvala	Ford Focus RS WRC 07	3:35:09.6	20	353.75 km	40	28
4	Rally Argentina (27–30 March) — Results and report	1	(France) Sébastien Loeb	Citroën C4 WRC	4:05:48.6	21	347.91 km	56	31
4	Rally Argentina (27–30 March) — Results and report	2	(Australia) Chris Atkinson	Subaru Impreza WRC2007	4:08:21.8	21	347.91 km	56	31
4	Rally Argentina (27–30 March) — Results and report	3	(Spain) Daniel Sordo	Citroën C4 WRC	4:09:53.3	21	347.91 km	56	31
5	Jordan Rally (24–27 April) — Results and report	1	(Finland) Mikko Hirvonen	Ford Focus RS WRC 07	4:02:47.9	22	359.26 km	54	33
5	Jordan Rally (24–27 April) — Results and report	2	(Spain) Daniel Sordo	Citroën C4 WRC	4:04:03.6	22	359.26 km	54	33
5	Jordan Rally (24–27 April) — Results and report	3	(Australia) Chris Atkinson	Subaru Impreza WRC2007	4:07:47.4	22	359.26 km	54	33
6	(Italy) Rally d'Italia Sardegna (16–18 May) — Results and report	1	(France) Sébastien Loeb	Citroën C4 WRC	3:57:17.2	17	344.73 km	57	38
6	(Italy) Rally d'Italia Sardegna (16–18 May) — Results and report	2	(Finland) Mikko Hirvonen	Ford Focus RS WRC 07	3:57:27.8	17	344.73 km	57	38
6	(Italy) Rally d'Italia Sardegna (16–18 May) — Results and report	3	(Finland) Jari-Matti Latvala	Ford Focus RS WRC 07	3:57:32.5	17	344.73 km	57	38
7	(Greece) Acropolis Rally (28 May– 1 June) — Results and report	1	(France) Sébastien Loeb	Citroën C4 WRC	3:54:54.7	20	331.52 km	60	42
7	(Greece) Acropolis Rally (28 May– 1 June) — Results and report	2	(Norway) Petter Solberg	Subaru Impreza WRC2008	3:56:04.2	20	331.52 km	60	42
7	(Greece) Acropolis Rally (28 May– 1 June) — Results and report	3	(Finland) Mikko Hirvonen	Ford Focus RS WRC 07	3:56:50.8	20	331.52 km	60	42
8	Rally of Turkey (13–15 June) — Results and report	1	(Finland) Mikko Hirvonen	Ford Focus RS WRC 07	4:42:07.1	19	360.12 km	60	37
8	Rally of Turkey (13–15 June) — Results and report	2	(Finland) Jari-Matti Latvala	Ford Focus RS WRC 07	4:42:15.0	19	360.12 km	60	37
8	Rally of Turkey (13–15 June) — Results and report	3	(France) Sébastien Loeb	Citroën C4 WRC	4:42:32.8	19	360.12 km	60	37
9	Rally Finland (31 July– 3 August) — Results and report	1	(France) Sébastien Loeb	Citroën C4 WRC	2:54:05.5	24	340.42 km	99	68
9	Rally Finland (31 July– 3 August) — Results and report	2	(Finland) Mikko Hirvonen	Ford Focus RS WRC 07	2:54:14.5	24	340.42 km	99	68
9	Rally Finland (31 July– 3 August) — Results and report	3	(Australia) Chris Atkinson	Subaru Impreza WRC2008	2:57:22.5	24	340.42 km	99	68
10	(Germany) Rallye Deutschland (15–17 August) — Results and report	1	(France) Sébastien Loeb	Citroën C4 WRC	3:26:19.7	19	352.89 km	81	57
10	(Germany) Rallye Deutschland (15–17 August) — Results and report	2	(Spain) Daniel Sordo	Citroën C4 WRC	3:27:07.4	19	352.89 km	81	57
10	(Germany) Rallye Deutschland (15–17 August) — Results and report	3	(Belgium) François Duval	Ford Focus RS WRC 07	3:27:39.7	19	352.89 km	81	57
11	Rally New Zealand (28–31 August) — Results and report	1	(France) Sébastien Loeb	Citroën C4 WRC	3:59:18.9	18	353.04 km	57	35
11	Rally New Zealand (28–31 August) — Results and report	2	(Spain) Dani Sordo	Citroën C4 WRC	3:59:36.4	18	353.04 km	57	35
11	Rally New Zealand (28–31 August) — Results and report	3	(Finland) Mikko Hirvonen	Ford Focus RS WRC 08	4:00:00.4	18	353.04 km	57	35
12	(Spain) Rally Catalunya (2–5 October) — Results and report	1	(France) Sébastien Loeb	Citroën C4 WRC	3:21:17.4	18	353.62 km	69	48
12	(Spain) Rally Catalunya (2–5 October) — Results and report	2	(Spain) Daniel Sordo	Citroën C4 WRC	3:21:42.3	18	353.62 km	69	48
12	(Spain) Rally Catalunya (2–5 October) — Results and report	3	(Finland) Mikko Hirvonen	Ford Focus RS WRC 08	3:22:19.9	18	353.62 km	69	48
13	(France) Tour de Corse (10–12 October) — Results and report	1	(France) Sébastien Loeb	Citroën C4 WRC	3:42:58.0	16	359.02 km	71	54
13	(France) Tour de Corse (10–12 October) — Results and report	2	(Finland) Mikko Hirvonen	Ford Focus RS WRC 08	3:46:22.7	16	359.02 km	71	54
13	(France) Tour de Corse (10–12 October) — Results and report	3	(Belgium) François Duval	Ford Focus RS WRC 08	3:46:29.6	16	359.02 km	71	54
14	Rally Japan (31 October– 2 November) — Results and report	1	(Finland) Mikko Hirvonen	Ford Focus RS WRC 08	3:25:03.0	29	343.69 km	86	57
14	Rally Japan (31 October– 2 November) — Results and report	2	(Finland) Jari-Matti Latvala	Ford Focus RS WRC 08	3:25:34.1	29	343.69 km	86	57
14	Rally Japan (31 October– 2 November) — Results and report	3	(France) Sébastien Loeb	Citroën C4 WRC	3:27:33.6	29	343.69 km	86	57
15	(United Kingdom) Wales Rally GB (5–7 December) — Results and report	1	(France) Sébastien Loeb	Citroën C4 WRC	2:43:09.6	19	282.35 km	78	47
15	(United Kingdom) Wales Rally GB (5–7 December) — Results and report	2	(Finland) Jari-Matti Latvala	Ford Focus RS WRC 08	2:43:22.3	19	282.35 km	78	47
15	(United Kingdom) Wales Rally GB (5–7 December) — Results and report	3	(Spain) Daniel Sordo	Citroën C4 WRC	2:45:30.2	19	282.35 km	78	47

== Standings ==
=== Drivers' championship ===
Pos.	Driver	MON (Monaco)	SWE (Sweden)	MEX (Mexico)	ARG (Argentina)	JOR (Jordan)	ITA (Italy)	GRC (Greece)	TUR (Turkey)	FIN (Finland)	GER (Germany)	NZL (New Zealand)	ESP (Spain)	FRA (France)	JPN (Japan)	GBR (United Kingdom)	Pts
1	(France) Sébastien Loeb	1	Ret	1	1	10	1	1	3	1	1	1	1	1	3	1	122
2	(Finland) Mikko Hirvonen	2	2	4	5	1	2	3	1	2	4	3	3	2	1	8	103
3	(Spain) Daniel Sordo	11	6	17	3	2	5	5	4	4	2	2	2	Ret	DSQ	3	65
4	(Finland) Jari-Matti Latvala	12	1	3	15	7	3	7	2	39	9	Ret	6	4	2	2	58
5	(Australia) Chris Atkinson	3	21	2	2	3	6	Ret	13	3	6	Ret	7	6	4	Ret	50
6	(Norway) Petter Solberg	5	4	12	Ret	Ret	10	2	6	6	5	4	5	5	8	4	46
7	(Belgium) François Duval	4									3	Ret	4	3	Ret	6	25
8	(Norway) Henning Solberg	9	13	5	Ret	4	7	8	5	5	7	9	11	15	Ret	Ret	22
9	(Italy) Gianluigi Galli	6	3	Ret	7	8	4	Ret	Ret	Ret	Ret						17
10	(United Kingdom) Matthew Wilson	10	Ret	6	Ret	5	12	6	7	9	12	17	9	8	7	9	15
11	(Estonia) Urmo Aava		18			Ret	8	4	Ret	16	8	5	35	7		DNS	13
12	(Sweden) Per-Gunnar Andersson	8	Ret	Ret	24	Ret	9	11	Ret	Ret	15	6	32	17	5	5	12
13	(Finland) Toni Gardemeister	Ret	7	Ret	Ret	Ret	Ret	9	Ret	8	10	7	13	13	6	7	10
14	(Argentina) Federico Villagra			7	6	6	14	13	9	Ret		8	12		9		9
15	(Zimbabwe) Conrad Rautenbach	Ret	16	16	4	26	13	10	8	10	13	Ret	Ret	14	Ret	15	6
16	(Norway) Andreas Mikkelsen		5				Ret		19	12	11		8	11			5
17	(France) Jean-Marie Cuoq	7															2
18	(Finland) Matti Rantanen									7							2
19	(Finland) Juho Hänninen		8					21		13		14	29	24	10	Ret	1
20	(Austria) Andreas Aigner		31		8			14	11	Ret		Ret				13	1
21	(France) Sébastien Ogier			8		11	22			36	19		Ret	20		26	1
Pos.	Driver	MON (Monaco)	SWE (Sweden)	MEX (Mexico)	ARG (Argentina)	JOR (Jordan)	ITA (Italy)	GRC (Greece)	TUR (Turkey)	FIN (Finland)	GER (Germany)	NZL (New Zealand)	ESP (Spain)	FRA (France)	JPN (Japan)	GBR (United Kingdom)	Pts

Key
Colour	Result
Gold	Winner
Silver	2nd place
Bronze	3rd place
Green	Points finish
Blue	Non-points finish
Blue	Non-classified finish (NC)
Purple	Did not finish (Ret)
Black	Excluded (EX)
Black	Disqualified (DSQ)
White	Did not start (DNS)
White	Cancelled (C)
Blank	Withdrew entry from the event (WD)

- Sébastien Loeb secured the drivers' championship title in Japan.

=== Manufacturers' championship ===
Pos.	Manufacturer	No.	MON (Monaco)	SWE (Sweden)	MEX (Mexico)	ARG (Argentina)	JOR (Jordan)	ITA (Italy)	GRE (Greece)	TUR (Turkey)	FIN (Finland)	GER (Germany)	NZL (New Zealand)	ESP (Spain)	FRA (France)	JPN (Japan)	GBR (United Kingdom)	Points
1	(France) Citroën Total World Rally Team	1	1	Ret	1	1	8	1	1	3	1	1	1	1	1	3	1	191
1	(France) Citroën Total World Rally Team	2	8	5	9	3	2	5	4	4	4	2	2	2	Ret	Ret	3	191
2	(United Kingdom) BP Ford World Rally Team	3	2	2	4	4	1	2	3	1	2	4	3	3	2	1	8	173
2	(United Kingdom) BP Ford World Rally Team	4	12	1	3	7	6	3	5	2	8	7	Ret	4	3	2	2	173
3	(Japan) Subaru World Rally Team	5	5	4	8	Ret	Ret	9	2	6	6	5	4	5	5	8	4	98
3	(Japan) Subaru World Rally Team	6	3	8	2	2	3	6	Ret	9	3	6	Ret	7	6	4	Ret	98
4	(United Kingdom) Stobart M-Sport Ford Rally Team	7	6	3	Ret	6	7	4	Ret	Ret	Ret	Ret	Ret	8	7	Ret	6	67
4	(United Kingdom) Stobart M-Sport Ford Rally Team	8	4	7	6	Ret	4	10	6	5	5	3	9	6	4	7	9	67
5	(Japan) Suzuki World Rally Team	11	Ret	6	Ret	Ret	Ret	Ret	7	Ret	7	8	6	11	8	6	7	34
5	(Japan) Suzuki World Rally Team	12	7	Ret	Ret	8	Ret	8	8	Ret	Ret	9	5	12	9	5	5	34
6	(Argentina) Munchi's Ford World Rally Team	9			7	5	5	11	9	7	Ret		7	10		9		22
6	(Argentina) Munchi's Ford World Rally Team	10			5	Ret	9	7	Ret	8	Ret		8	9		Ret		22
Pos.	Manufacturer	No.	MON (Monaco)	SWE (Sweden)	MEX (Mexico)	ARG (Argentina)	JOR (Jordan)	ITA (Italy)	GRE (Greece)	TUR (Turkey)	FIN (Finland)	GER (Germany)	NZL (New Zealand)	ESP (Spain)	FRA (France)	JPN (Japan)	GBR (United Kingdom)	Points

Key
Colour	Result
Gold	Winner
Silver	2nd place
Bronze	3rd place
Green	Points finish
Blue	Non-points finish
Blue	Non-classified finish (NC)
Purple	Did not finish (Ret)
Black	Excluded (EX)
Black	Disqualified (DSQ)
White	Did not start (DNS)
White	Cancelled (C)
Blank	Withdrew entry from the event (WD)

- Citroën secured the manufacturers' championship in Wales.

=== Junior championship ===
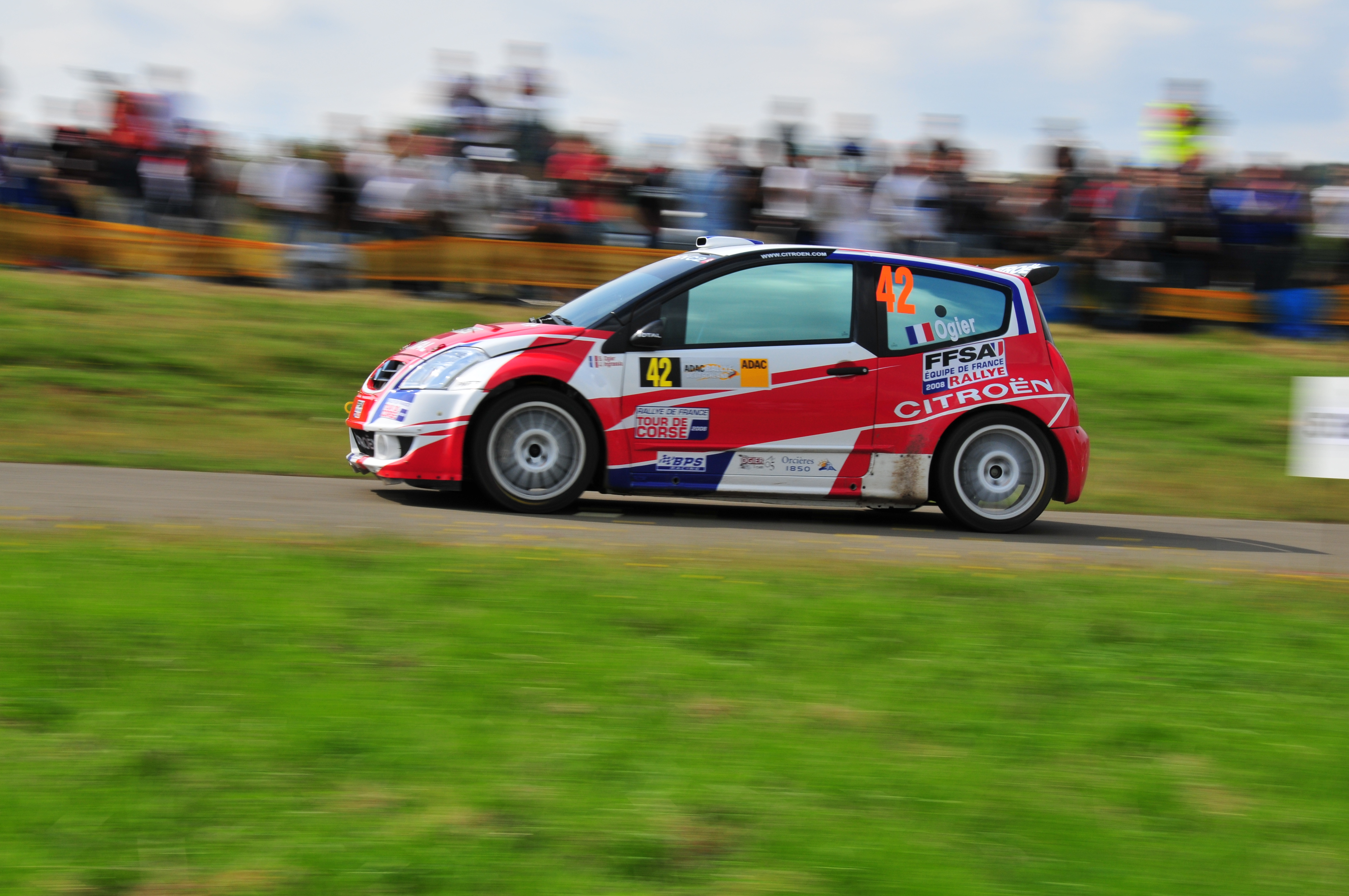
Junior world champion Sébastien Ogier competing in a Citroën C2 S1600 at the 2008 Rallye Deutschland.

Pos.	Driver	MEX (Mexico)	JOR (Jordan)	ITA (Italy)	FIN (Finland)	GER (Germany)	ESP (Spain)	FRA (France)	Pts
1	(France) Sébastien Ogier	1	1	5		1	Ret	2	42
2	(Germany) Aaron Burkart	4		3	4	2	3	5	34
3	(Czech Republic) Martin Prokop	7		10	1	Ret	1	1	32
4	(Republic of Ireland) Shaun Gallagher	6	2	4	5	4	4		30
5	(Poland) Michał Kościuszko	3	Ret	1	3		9	Ret	22
6	(Italy) Alessandro Bettega		Ret	2	Ret	3	2	Ret	22
7	(Sweden) Patrik Sandell	5	Ret	7	2		5	6	22
8	(Estonia) Jaan Mölder	2	Ret	9	Ret		6	11	11
9	(Italy) Stefano Albertini		5	6	13	10	7	9	9
10	(Luxembourg) Gilles Schammel		3	12	7	Ret	Ret	10	8
11	(Germany) Florian Niegel		4	Ret	9	8	10	7	8
12	(Italy) Simone Bertolotti		6	Ret	10	5	8	Ret	8
13	(Netherlands) Kevin Abbring		Ret	Ret	6	6	11	8	7
14	(France) Pierre Campana							3	6
15	(France) Pierre Marché							4	5
16	(Italy) Andrea Cortinovis		7	11	DNS	7	DNS	DNS	4
17	(Netherlands) Hans Weijs, Jr.		Ret	8	8	Ret	Ret	12	2
18	(Italy) Francesco Fanari	8	9	13	12	9	Ret		1
19	(Serbia) Miloš Komljenović	Ret	8	Ret	11				1
Pos.	Driver	MEX (Mexico)	JOR (Jordan)	ITA (Italy)	FIN (Finland)	GER (Germany)	ESP (Spain)	FRA (France)	Pts

=== Production championship ===
Points table:

Pos.	Driver	SWE (Sweden)	ARG (Argentina)	GRC (Greece)	TUR (Turkey)	FIN (Finland)	NZL (New Zealand)	JPN (Japan)	GBR (United Kingdom)	Pts
1	(Austria) Andreas Aigner	11	1	1	1		Ret		2	38
2	(Finland) Juho Hänninen	1		7		1	5	1	Ret	36
3	(Finland) Jari Ketomaa	2	3	Ret		3	6		4	28
4	(Sweden) Patrik Sandell	3	Ret	Ret	2		2			22
5	(Czech Republic) Martin Prokop	4	7	14	DSQ		1		Ret	17
6	(Estonia) Martin Rauam		5	DSQ	4		3	Ret		15
7	(Japan) Fumio Nutahara		4	4		5	Ret	8	Ret	15
8	(Portugal) Armindo Araújo	7		3	5		12	9	7	14
9	(Portugal) Bernardo Sousa	8	8	2	11		7		9	12
10	(Sweden) Patrik Flodin	16				DSQ			1	10
11	(San Marino) Mirco Baldacci		Ret	Ret	3		Ret	6	Ret	9
12	(Japan) Toshihiro Arai	6	Ret	Ret	Ret		Ret	3		9
13	(Russia) Evgeny Novikov		Ret	15	Ret		Ret	2	Ret	8
14	(Argentina) Sebastián Beltrán		2							8
15	(Finland) Jussi Välimäki					2				8
16	(United Kingdom) Guy Wilks								3	6
17	(Russia) Evgeny Aksakov	13	12	5	Ret	7			Ret	6
18	(Russia) Evgeny Vertunov	Ret		6	6	Ret	Ret	Ret		6
19	(Norway) Eyvind Brynildsen	15		Ret	Ret	10		4		5
20	(Sweden) Oscar Svedlund	Ret				4				5
21	(New Zealand) Hayden Paddon						4			5
22	(Germany) Uwe Nittel	5	Ret	Ret	Ret					4
23	(Japan) Takuma Kamada							5		4
24	(Czech Republic) Jaromír Tarabus								5	4
25	(Jordan) Amjad Farrah		6	9	Ret					3
26	(Cyprus) Spyros Pavlides		11	Ret			10		6	3
27	(Finland) Jussi Tiippana	11				6				3
28	(Italy) Simone Campedelli	9	9	Ret	7	8			10	3
29	(Japan) Katsuhiko Taguchi							7		2
30	(Italy) Giorgio Bacco		13		8		Ret			1
31	(United Kingdom) David Higgins								8	1
32	(San Marino) Loris Baldacci			8					Ret	1
33	(New Zealand) Stewart Taylor						8			1
Pos.	Driver	SWE (Sweden)	ARG (Argentina)	GRC (Greece)	TUR (Turkey)	FIN (Finland)	NZL (New Zealand)	JPN (Japan)	GBR (United Kingdom)	Pts
