= Tire mousse =

Run-flat tire component

Tire mousse is a component in certain types of off-road run-flat tires, designed to allow them to maintain functionality despite a puncture. It is a ring of flexible foam that is placed inside a tire before it is fitted on the rim. The original run-flat mousse, called Bib-Mousse, was developed in 1984 by Michelin, for use on motorbikes in enduro, rally-raid and motocross events. In 1987, Michelin debuted its ATS system (Appui Temporaire Souple, or Flexible Temporary Support) on the works Renault 11s of Jean Ragnotti and François Chatriot on the Acropolis Rally. It won the Technological Innovation Award in 1988.

== Use ==
The mousse is compressed as soon as the tire is inflated. Once the tire begins being used, it heats up and becomes primed for use. In the event of an air leak, and subsequent loss of pressure, the mousse expands to fill the void, giving a pressure almost equal to that of a properly inflated tire.

Mousse is used on cars and motorcycles in certain types of off-road racing such as the Dakar Rally.

=== Bib-Mousse ===
Bib-Mousse is a Tire mousse made by French tire manufacturer Michelin. The Bib-Mousse was named after Michelin's well-known mascot, Bibendum. It is a ring of butyl honeycomb foam with its cells filled with nitrogen. It has a smooth-molded outer skin that is designed to slip into specific size off-road motorcycle tires.
