= 2008 Rally of Turkey =

Rallying motorsport event

2008 Rally of Turkey 9th Rally of Turkey
Round 8 of the 2008 World Rally Championship
← Previous event	Next event →
- Host country: Turkey
- Rally base: Antalya
- Dates run: June 12 – 15 2008
- Stages: 19 (360.74 km; 224.15 miles)
- Stage surface: Gravel
- Overall distance: 1,263.74 km (785.25 miles)

Statistics
- Crews: 60 at start, 38 at finish

Overall results
- Overall winner: (Finland) Mikko Hirvonen; BP Ford Abu Dhabi World Rally Team

The 9th Rally of Turkey, the 8th round of the 2008 World Rally Championship season took place between June 12–15, 2008. The event returned after a year sabbatical and was held in the south west of Turkey, with the rally headquarters and service park based in the seaside resort of Kemer. The special stages are held on gravel mountain roads to the south west of Antalya. The rally was won by Finland's Mikko Hirvonen, with Jari-Matti Latvala finishing second and Sébastien Loeb third. With this result Hirvonen took a three-point lead over Loeb in the drivers world championship going into the six-week summer break.

== Event ==
=== Day one ===
The event kicked off with a short superspecial stage on Thursday evening, which was won by Sébastien Loeb. On Friday - the first full day of the rally - he was due to run first and 'clean' the roads. This had a big impact on his performance (his stage times were up to 29 seconds quicker on the second pass through the stages) and meant that he would only win one stage on the day. Despite this he would still be leading the end of day one as the Ford drivers all took a tactical approach to the final stage of the day in order to secure a more advantageous road position for day two - a tactic criticised by the Citroën Total team boss Olivier Quesnel. Behind Loeb were the drivers for the BP-Ford Abu Dhabi World Rally Team and the Stobart VK M-Sport team, with the last of the Ford quartet, fifth place man Mikko Hirvonen, a mere 6.2 seconds behind Loeb at the end of day one. Ahead of Hirvonen was Gigi Galli in fourth place. Galli won three stages, with his teammate Henning Solberg winning one stage and finishing the day in second place. The remaining Ford driver was Jari-Matti Latvala who ended the day in third place after an astonishing performance that saw him take two stage wins (one by a margin of 15 seconds) and pick up two punctures.

Behind the leaders was Subaru driver Petter Solberg. The new Subaru was more disappointing than on its debut in Greece with Petter Solberg nearly 50 seconds off the pace. Matthew Wilson was in seventh spot, just over a minute behind despite suffering with a cold. In the final points paying position was Dani Sordo. Sordo was running in fifth until suspension damage on stage 7 put him back into 8th place.

=== Day two ===
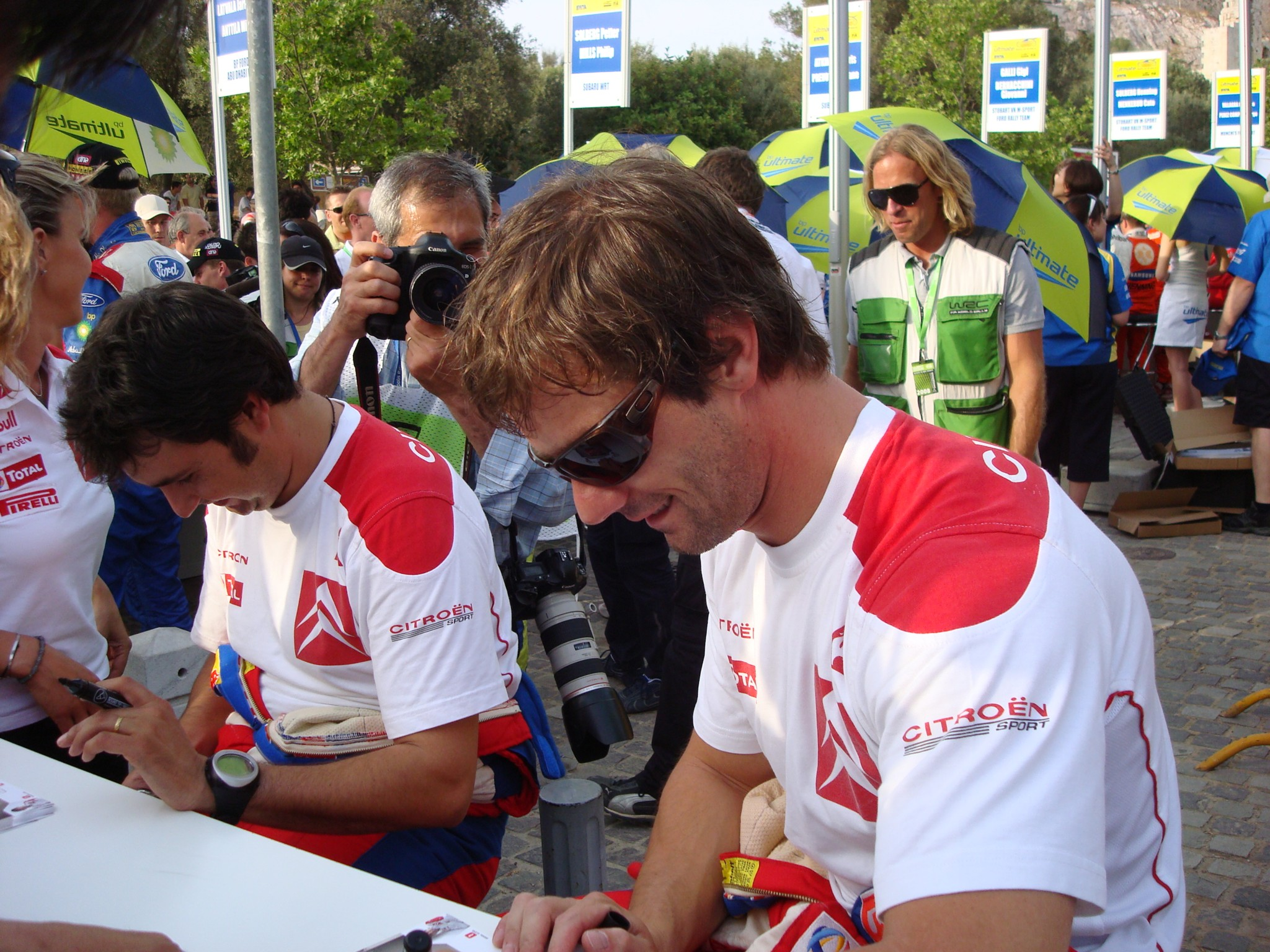
Daniel Elena and Sébastien Loeb

The Citroën teams fears about road sweeping were confirmed throughout the day as Loeb lost time to both factory Ford drivers. By the end of the day Loeb was 34 seconds adrift of new rally leader Mikko Hirvonen, yet Loeb still believed that "anything was possible". Hirvonen had earlier said that he needed a lead of 50 seconds to hang on to his lead throughout Sunday. With a lead of only 16 seconds over his teammate Latvala - there was still everything to play for going into Sunday. Behind the three leaders, the two Stobart drivers both had a less successful day. After starting brightly, Gigi Galli suffered turbo problems throughout stages 12 and 13 which dropped him to 8th place by the end of the day. Galli had to retire from the rally at this stage as he was suffering from dehydration and exhaustion. Henning Solberg had a quiet day and gradually dropped time, finishing up just over two minutes off the pace in 4th place with Dani Sordo looming large, only 7 seconds behind. Petter Solberg and Matthew Wilson continued their steady runs in 6th and 7th place respectively.

=== Day three ===
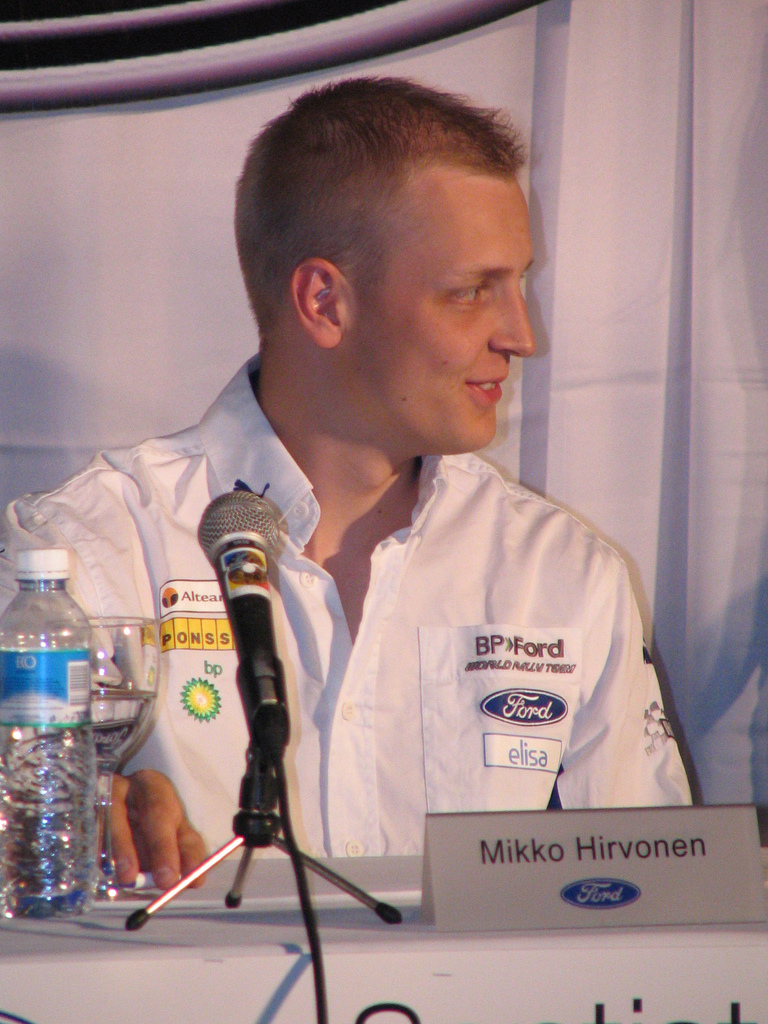
Rally winner Mikko Hirvonen

With over sixty five kilometres of special stages still to go, the rally was still wide open. The tension was increased further after the first special stage of the day as Hirvonen stalled at the start line and lost nine seconds of his advantage to Latvala. Everything had looked settled after special stage 18, with Latvala making a small mistake and losing the advantage he had gained at the previous stage, but the final thirty kilometre stage saw drama right to the end. Both the challengers to Hirvonen's lead were making significant inroads at the mid way split. Latvala was 4.3 seconds faster than Hirvonen, with Loeb 11.3 seconds faster and putting both Ford drivers under enormous pressure - pressure that was increased when Hirvonen suffered a puncture near the end of the stage. However, Latvala and Loeb's tyres were also very worn and they could not maintain their final stage attack. At the end Hirvonen hung on to win by 7.9 seconds from Latvala, with Loeb 25 seconds back in third.

Behind the podium finishers, Citroën's Dani Sordo easily picked off Henning Solberg to claim fourth place. Henning's brother Petter Solberg maintained his sixth position, never really being in a position to challenge the Stobart Ford driver. Matthew Wilson shrugged off his cold to finish in seventh with eighth place going to privateer Conrad Rautenbach, scoring his second points finish of the season. Federico Villagra and Barry Clark finished ninth and tenth, thus earning the Munchi's Ford team three valuable manufacturer points.

== Results ==
Pos.	Driver	Co-driver	Car	Time	Difference	Points
WRC
1.	(Finland) Mikko Hirvonen	(Finland) Jarmo Lehtinen	Ford Focus RS WRC 07	4:42:07.1	0.0	10
2	(Finland) Jari-Matti Latvala	(Finland) Miikka Anttila	Ford Focus RS WRC 07	4:42:15.0	7.9	8
3	(France) Sébastien Loeb	(Monaco) Daniel Elena	Citroën C4 WRC	4:42:32.8	25.7	6
4	(Spain) Dani Sordo	(Spain) Marc Marti	Citroën C4 WRC	4:44:32.7	2:25.6	5
5	(Norway) Henning Solberg	(Norway) Cato Menkerud	Ford Focus RS WRC 07	4:44:40.8	2:33.7	4
6	(Norway) Petter Solberg	(United Kingdom) Phil Mills	Subaru Impreza WRC 2008	4:44:55.3	2:48.2	3
7	(United Kingdom) Matthew Wilson	(United Kingdom) Scott Martin	Ford Focus RS WRC 07	4:46:31.3	4:24.2	2
8	(Zimbabwe) Conrad Rautenbach	(United Kingdom) David Senior	Citroën C4 WRC	4:49:53.8	7:46.7	1
PCWRC
1	(Austria) Andreas Aigner	(Germany) Klaus Wicha	Mitsubishi Lancer Evo 9	5:02:21.6	0.0	10
2	(Sweden) Patrik Sandell	(Sweden) Emil Axelsson	Peugeot 207 S2000	5:03:10.3	48.7	8
3	(Italy) Mirco Baldacci	(Italy) Giovanni Agnese	Mitsubishi Lancer Evo 9	5:05:22.6	3:01.0	6
4	(Estonia) Martin Raum	(Estonia) Silver Kutt	Mitsubishi Lancer Evo 9	5:07:52.6	5:31.0	5
5	(Italy) Armindo Araujo	(Italy) Miguel Ramalho	Mitsubishi Lancer Evo 9	5:08:45.4	6:23.8	4
6	(Russia) Evgeniy Vertunov	(Russia) Georgy Troshkin	Subaru Impreza	5:09:14.6	6:53.0	3
7	(Italy) Simone Campedelli	(Italy) Danilo Fappani	Mitsubishi Lancer Evo 9	5:14:40.7	12:19.10	2
8	(Italy) Giorgio Bacco	(San Marino) Silvio Stefanelli	Subaru Impreza	5:25:14.3	22:52.7	1

== Retirements ==
- (Italy) Gigi Galli - ill health (SS16)
- (Finland) Toni Gardemeister - engine (SS15)
- (Sweden) Per-Gunnar Andersson - electrical (SS15)
- (Estonia) Urmo Aava - (SS19)
- (Japan) Toshi Arai - (SS16)
- (Czech Republic) Martin Prokop - excluded (SS11)
- (Norway) Eyvind Brynildsen - (SS15)
- (Germany) Uwe Nittel - (SS17)
- (Italy) Francesco Trevisin - (SS9)
- (Jordan) Amjad Farrah - (SS9)
- (Russia) Evgeny Novikov - (SS9)
- (Russia) Evgeny Aksakov - (SS9)

== Special stages ==
All dates and times are EEST (UTC+3).

Day	Stage	Time	Name	Length	Winner	Time	Avg. spd.	Rally leader
1 (12/13 JUN)	SS1	17:25	Antalya SSS 1	2.60 km	(France) S. Loeb	2:07.6	73.4 km/h	(France) S. Loeb
1 (12/13 JUN)	SS2	08:38	Perge 1	22.43 km	(Estonia) U. Aava	16:03.6	83.8 km/h	(Finland) M. Hirvonen
1 (12/13 JUN)	SS3	09:21	Myra 1	24.15 km	(Finland) J. Latvala	21:05.3	68.7 km/h	(Finland) M. Hirvonen
1 (12/13 JUN)	SS4	09:59	Kumluca 1	9.90 km	(Italy) G. Galli	7:47.4	76.3 km/h	(Finland) M. Hirvonen
1 (12/13 JUN)	SS5	12:57	Perge 2	22.43 km	(Italy) G. Galli	15:42.8	85.6 km/h	(Finland) M. Hirvonen
1 (12/13 JUN)	SS6	13:40	Myra 2	24.15 km	(Finland) J. Latvala	20:46.0	69.8 km/h	(Finland) J. Latvala
1 (12/13 JUN)	SS7	14:18	Kumluca 2	9.90 km	(France) S. Loeb	7:38.9	77.7 km/h	(Finland) M. Hirvonen
1 (12/13 JUN)	SS8	17:01	Chimera 1	16.94 km	(Italy) G. Galli	12:21.5	82.2 km/h	(Finland) M. Hirvonen
1 (12/13 JUN)	SS9	17:47	Phaselis 1	22.40 km	(Norway) H. Solberg	17:49.3	75.6 km/h	(France) S. Loeb
2 (14 JUN)	SS10	09:28	Chimera 2	16.94 km	(Finland) M. Hirvonen	11:57.3	85.0 km/h	(France) S. Loeb
2 (14 JUN)	SS11	10:16	Silyon 1	27.36 km	(Finland) M. Hirvonen	21:53.5	75.0 km/h	(Finland) M. Hirvonen
2 (14 JUN)	SS12	12:59	Kemer 1	20.50 km	(Estonia) U. Aava	15:06.9	81.4 km/h	(Finland) M. Hirvonen
2 (14 JUN)	SS13	13:49	Silyon 2	27.36 km	(Finland) M. Hirvonen	21:36.8	75.9 km/h	(Finland) M. Hirvonen
2 (14 JUN)	SS14	16:32	Kemer 2	20.50 km	(Finland) J. Latvala	14:49.4	83.0 km/h	(Finland) M. Hirvonen
2 (14 JUN)	SS15	18:23	Phaselis 2	22.40 km	(Finland) M. Hirvonen (France) S. Loeb	17:19.2	77.6 km/h	(Finland) M. Hirvonen
2 (14 JUN)	SS16	19:01	Antalya SSS 2	2.60 km	(France) S. Loeb	2:06.3	74.1 km/h	(Finland) M. Hirvonen
3 (15 JUN)	SS17	09:38	Olympos 1	31.03 km	(Estonia) U. Aava	25:07.5	74.1 km/h	(Finland) M. Hirvonen
3 (15 JUN)	SS18	12:04	Camyuva	5.50 km	(France) S. Loeb	4:11.2	78.8 km/h	(Finland) M. Hirvonen
3 (15 JUN)	SS19	13:07	Olympos 2	31.03 km	(Finland) J. Latvala	24:48.9	75.0 km/h	(Finland) M. Hirvonen

== Championship standings after the event ==
=== Drivers' championship ===
Pos	Driver	MON (Monaco)	SWE (Sweden)	MEX (Mexico)	ARG (Argentina)	JOR (Jordan)	ITA (Italy)	GRC (Greece)	TUR (Turkey)	FIN (Finland)	GER (Germany)	NZL (New Zealand)	ESP (Spain)	FRA (France)	JPN (Japan)	GBR (United Kingdom)	Pts
1	(Finland) Mikko Hirvonen	2	2	4	5	1	2	3	1								59
2	(France) Sébastien Loeb	1	Ret.	1	1	10	1	1	3								56
3	(Finland) Jari-Matti Latvala	12	1	3	15	7	3	7	2								34
4	(Australia) Chris Atkinson	3	21	2	2	3	6	Ret.	13								31
5	(Spain) Dani Sordo	11	6	17	3	2	5	5	4								30
6	(Norway) Petter Solberg	5	4	12	Ret.	Ret.	10	2	6								20
7	(Italy) Gigi Galli	6	3	Ret.	7	8	4	Ret.	Ret.								17
8	(Norway) Henning Solberg	9	13	5	Ret.	4	7	8	5								16
9	(United Kingdom) Matthew Wilson	10	Ret.	6	Ret.	5	12	6	7								12
10	(Argentina) Federico Villagra			7	6	6	14	13	9								8
11	(Zimbabwe) Conrad Rautenbach	Ret.	16	16	4	26	13	10	8								6
11	(Estonia) Urmo Aava		18			Ret.	8	4	Ret.								6
13	(Belgium) François Duval	4															5
14	(Norway) Andreas Mikkelsen		5				Ret.		19								4
15	(France) Jean-Marie Cuoq	7															2
15	(Finland) Toni Gardemeister	Ret.	7	Ret.	Ret.	Ret.	Ret.	9	Ret.								2
17	(Sweden) Per-Gunnar Andersson	8	Ret.	Ret.	24	Ret.	9	11	Ret.								1
17	(Finland) Juho Hänninen		8														1
17	(France) Sébastien Ogier			8		11	22										1
17	(Austria) Andreas Aigner		31		8			14	11								1
Pos	Driver	MON (Monaco)	SWE (Sweden)	MEX (Mexico)	ARG (Argentina)	JOR (Jordan)	ITA (Italy)	GRC (Greece)	TUR (Turkey)	FIN (Finland)	GER (Germany)	NZL (New Zealand)	ESP (Spain)	FRA (France)	JPN (Japan)	GBR (United Kingdom)	Pts

Key
Colour	Result
Gold	Winner
Silver	2nd place
Bronze	3rd place
Green	Points finish
Blue	Non-points finish
Blue	Non-classified finish (NC)
Purple	Did not finish (Ret)
Black	Excluded (EX)
Black	Disqualified (DSQ)
White	Did not start (DNS)
White	Cancelled (C)
Blank	Withdrew entry from the event (WD)

=== Manufacturers' championship ===
Rank	Team	Event															Total points
Rank	Team	MON (Monaco)	SWE (Sweden)	MEX (Mexico)	ARG (Argentina)	JOR (Jordan)	ITA (Italy)	GRC (Greece)	TUR (Turkey)	FIN (Finland)	GER (Germany)	NZL (New Zealand)	ESP (Spain)	FRA (France)	JPN (Japan)	GBR (United Kingdom)	Total points
1	(United Kingdom) BP Ford World Rally Team	8	18	11	7	13	14	10	18	-	-	-	-	-	-	-	99
2	(France) Citroën Total World Rally Team	11	4	10	16	9	14	15	11	-	-	-	-	-	-	-	90
3	(Japan) Subaru World Rally Team	10	6	9	8	6	3	8	3	-	-	-	-	-	-	-	53
4	(United Kingdom) Stobart M-Sport Ford	8	8	3	3	7	5	3	4	-	-	-	-	-	-	-	41
5	(Argentina) Munchi's Ford World Rally Team	0	0	6	4	4	2	0	3	-	-	-	-	-	-	-	19
6	(Japan) Suzuki World Rally Team	2	3	0	1	0	1	3	0	-	-	-	-	-	-	-	10
