= 2008 Rally d'Italia Sardegna =

Rallying motorsport event

Round 6 of the 2008 World Rally Championship
← Previous event	Next event →
- Host country: Italy
- Rally base: Olbia, Italy
- Dates run: May 16 – 18 2008
- Stages: 17 (344.73 km; 214.21 miles)
- Stage surface: Gravel
- Overall distance: 1,040.35 km (646.44 miles)

Statistics
- Crews: 57 at start, 39 at finish

Overall results
- Overall winner: (France) Sébastien Loeb (France) Citroën Total World Rally Team

The 2008 Rally d'Italia Sardegna is the sixth round of 2008 World Rally Championship season. The event began on May 16 in Olbia, Italy, and finished on May 18.

== Results ==
Pos.	Driver	Co-driver	Car	Time	Difference	Points
WRC
1	(France) Sébastien Loeb	(Monaco) Daniel Elena	Citroën C4 WRC	3:57:17.2	0.0	10
2	(Finland) Mikko Hirvonen	(Finland) Jarmo Lehtinen	Ford Focus RS WRC 07	3:57:27.8	10.6	8
3	(Finland) Jari-Matti Latvala	(Finland) Miikka Anttila	Ford Focus RS WRC 07	3:57:32.5	15.3	6
4	(Italy) Gigi Galli	(Italy) Giovanni Bernacchini	Ford Focus RS WRC 07	3:58:59.7	1:42.5	5
5	(Spain) Dani Sordo	(Spain) Marc Marti	Citroën C4 WRC	3:59:22.8	2:05.6	4
6	(Australia) Chris Atkinson	(Belgium) Stephane Prevot	Subaru Impreza WRC	4:02:25.8	5:08.6	3
7	(Norway) Henning Solberg	(Norway) Cato Menkerud	Ford Focus RS WRC 07	4:03:18.2	6:01.0	2
8	(Estonia) Urmo Aava	(Estonia) Kuldar Sikk	Citroën C4 WRC	4:03:38.5	6:21.3	1

== Special stages ==
All dates and times are CEST (UTC+2).

Day	Stage	Time	Name	Length	Winner	Time	Rally leader
1 (16 May)	SS1	10:23	Monte Corvos 1	16.43km	(Finland) Jari-Matti Latvala	11:24.3	(Finland) Jari-Matti Latvala
1 (16 May)	SS2	10:50	Crastazza 1	33.96km	(France) Sébastien Loeb	23:56.1	(France) Sébastien Loeb
1 (16 May)	SS3	12:07	Terranova 1	15.39km	(France) Sébastien Loeb	10:48.3	(France) Sébastien Loeb
1 (16 May)	SS4	15:18	Monte Corvos 2	16.43km	(Italy) Gigi Galli	11:07.3	(France) Sébastien Loeb
1 (16 May)	SS5	15:45	Crastazza 2	33.96km	(France) Sébastien Loeb	23:21.4	(France) Sébastien Loeb
1 (16 May)	SS6	17:02	Terranova 2	15.39km	(Finland) Jari-Matti Latvala	10:30.9	(France) Sébastien Loeb
2 (17 May)	SS7	9:39	Punta Pianedda 1	18.53km	(Finland) Jari-Matti Latvala	11:27.8	(France) Sébastien Loeb
2 (17 May)	SS8	10:31	Monte Lerno 1	29.31km	(Finland) Jari-Matti Latvala	19:46.3	(France) Sébastien Loeb
2 (17 May)	SS9	11:16	Su Filigosu 1	19.46km	(Finland) Jari-Matti Latvala	12:43.3	(France) Sébastien Loeb
2 (17 May)	SS10	14:56	Punta Pianedda 2	18.53km	(Finland) Jari-Matti Latvala	11:09.3	(France) Sébastien Loeb
2 (17 May)	SS11	15.48	Monte Lerno 2	29.31km	(Finland) Jari-Matti Latvala	19:19.9	(France) Sébastien Loeb
2 (17 May)	SS12	16:33	Su Filigosu 2	19.46km	(Finland) Jari-Matti Latvala	12:35.6	(France) Sébastien Loeb
3 (18 May)	SS13	8:10	Monte Olia 1	19.28km	(Finland) Mikko Hirvonen	14:03.2	(France) Sébastien Loeb
3 (18 May)	SS14	8:50	Sorilis 1	18.66km	(France) Sébastien Loeb	13:58.9	(France) Sébastien Loeb
3 (18 May)	SS15	11:36	Monte Olia 2	19.28km	(Finland) Jari-Matti Latvala	13:46.2	(France) Sébastien Loeb
3 (18 May)	SS16	12:16	Sorilis 2	18.66km	(Finland) Mikko Hirvonen	13:45.0	(France) Sébastien Loeb
3 (18 May)	SS17	14:10	Liscia Ruja	2.69km	(Finland) Jari-Matti Latvala	1:54.8	(France) Sébastien Loeb
