= 2008 Acropolis Rally =

Rallying motorsport event

2008 Acropolis Rally of Greece 55th BP Ultimate Acropolis Rally of Greece
Round 7 of the 2008 World Rally Championship season
← Previous event	Next event →
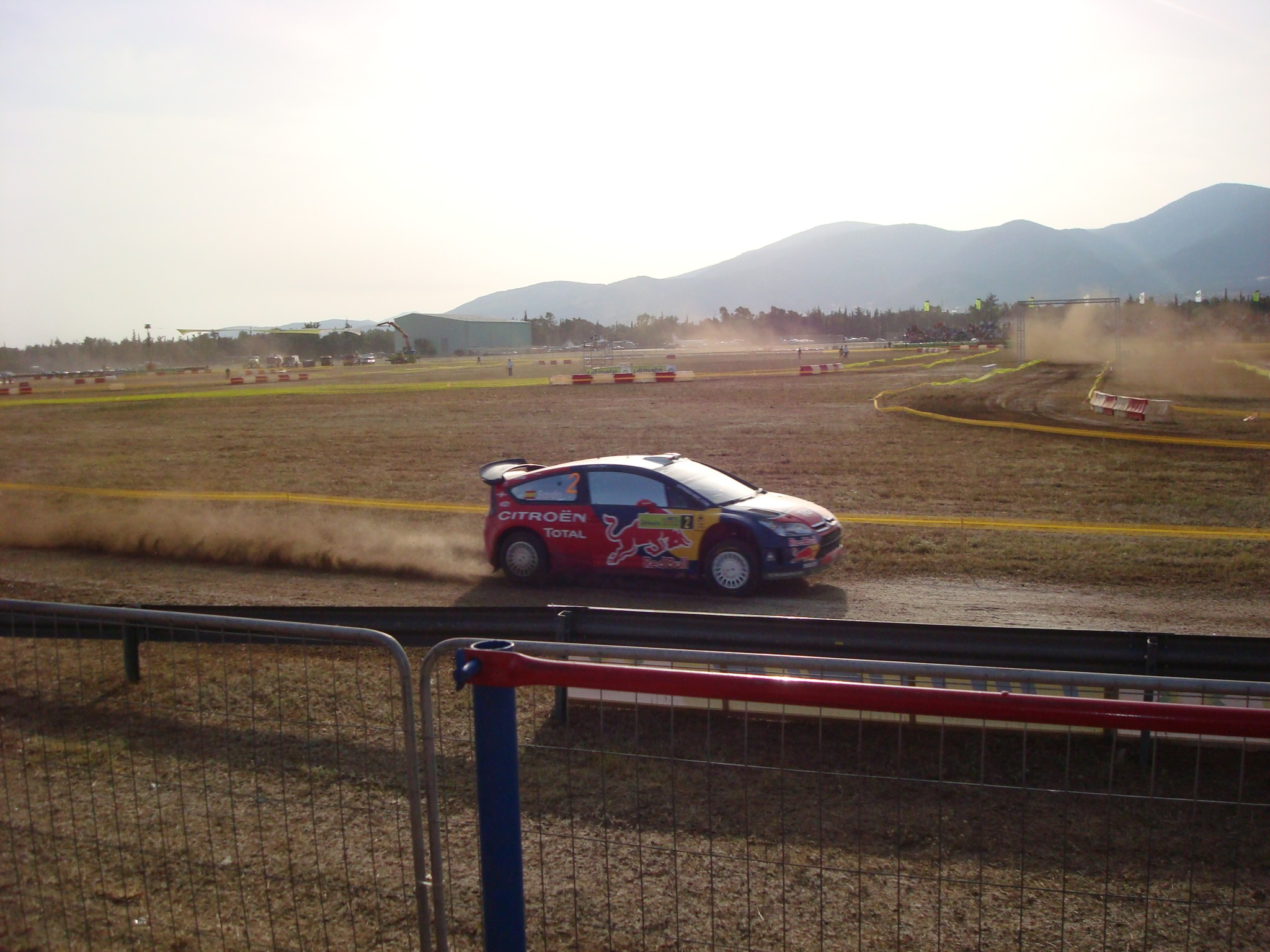
- Dani Sordo driving on the first super special stage.
- Host country: Greece
- Rally base: Schimatari
- Dates run: May 30 – June 1, 2008
- Stages: 19 (365.09 km; 226.86 miles)
- Stage surface: Gravel
- Overall distance: 1,481.25 km (920.41 miles)

Statistics
- Crews: 60 at start, 43 at finish

Overall results
- Overall winner: (France) Sébastien Loeb (France) Citroën Total World Rally Team

The 2008 Acropolis Rally of Greece was the seventh round of the 2008 World Rally Championship. It took place between May 29-June 1.

== Results ==
Pos.	Driver	Co-driver	Car	Time	Difference	Points
WRC
1.	(France) Sébastien Loeb	(Monaco) Daniel Elena	Citroën C4 WRC	3:54:54..7		10
2.	(Norway) Petter Solberg	(Wales) Phil Mills	Subaru Impreza WRC 2008	3:56:04.2	+1:09.5	8
3.	(Finland) Mikko Hirvonen	(Finland) Jarmo Lehtinen	Ford Focus RS WRC 07	3:56:50.8	+1:56.1	6
4.	(Estonia) Urmo Aava	(Estonia) Kuldar Sikk	Citroën C4 WRC	3:59:14.4	+4:19.7	5
5.	(Spain) Dani Sordo	(Spain) Marc Martí	Citroën C4 WRC	3:59:44.1	+4:49:4	4
6.	(United Kingdom) Matthew Wilson	(United Kingdom) Scott Martin	Ford Focus RS WRC 07	4:01:06.0	+6:11.3	3
7.	(Finland) Jari-Matti Latvala	(Finland) Miikka Anttila	Ford Focus RS WRC 07	4:01:42.2	+6:47.5	2
8.	(Norway) Henning Solberg	(Norway) Cato Menkerud	Ford Focus RS WRC 07	4:04:08.7	+9:14.0	1
PWRC
Pos.	Driver	Co-driver	Car	Time	Difference	Points
1. (14.)	(Austria) Andreas Aigner	(Germany) Klaus Wicha	Mitsubishi Lancer Evolution IX	4:16:06.7		10
2. (15.)	(Estonia) Martin Rauam	(Estonia) Silver Kutt	Mitsubishi Lancer Evolution IX	4:16:41.7	+35.0	8
3. (16.)	(Portugal) Bernardo Sousa	(Portugal) Jorge Carvalho	Mitsubishi Lancer Evolution IX	4:17:04.8	+58.1	6
4. (17.)	(Portugal) Armindo Araújo	(Portugal) Miguel Ramalho	Mitsubishi Lancer Evolution IX	4:17:34.4	+1:27.7	5
5. (18.)	(Japan) Fumio Nutahara	(United Kingdom) Daniel Barritt	Mitsubishi Lancer Evolution IX	4:18:19.6	+2:12.9	4
6. (19.)	(Russia) Evgeny Aksakov	(Estonia) Aleksandr Kornilov	Mitsubishi Lancer Evolution IX	4:23:11.6	+7:04.9	3
7. (20.)	(Russia) Evgeniy Vertunov	(Russia) Georgy Troshkin	Subaru Impreza WRX STI	4:24:08.1	+8:01.4	2
8. (21.)	(Finland) Juho Hänninen	(Finland) Mikko Markkula	Mitsubishi Lancer Evolution IX	4:25:07.0	+9:00.3	1

== Special Stages ==
All dates and times are EEST (UTC+3).

Day	Stage	Time	Name	Length	Winner	Time	Rally leader
1 (30 MAY)	SS1	09:16	Schimatari 1	11.57 km	(Finland) Jari-Matti Latvala	10:34.3	(Finland) Jari-Matti Latvala
1 (30 MAY)	SS2	10:04	Thiva 1	23.76 km	(France) Sébastien Loeb	17:15.2	(Finland) Jari-Matti Latvala
1 (30 MAY)	SS3	11:27	Psatha 1	17.41 km	(Finland) Jari-Matti Latvala	11:28.7	(Finland) Jari-Matti Latvala
1 (30 MAY)	SS4	14:40	Schimatari 2	11.57 km	(France) Sébastien Loeb	10:26.7	(France) Sébastien Loeb
1 (30 MAY)	SS5	15:28	Thiva 2	23.76 km	(France) Sébastien Loeb	16:53.8	(France) Sébastien Loeb
1 (30 MAY)	SS6	16:51	Psatha 2	17.41 km	(France) Sébastien Loeb	11:12.5	(France) Sébastien Loeb
1 (30 MAY)	SS7	18:30	Tatoi 1	4.6 km	(Estonia) Urmo Aava	3:31.3	(France) Sébastien Loeb
2 (31 MAY)	SS8	09:58	Aghii Theodori 1	32.16 km	(Finland) Mikko Hirvonen	22:42.1	(France) Sébastien Loeb
2 (31 MAY)	SS9	10:41	Pissia 1	16.6 km	(Italy) Gigi Galli	12:17.2	(Spain) Dani Sordo
2 (31 MAY)	SS10	12.09	Aghia Triada 1	10.8 km	(Italy) Gigi Galli	7:46.1	(Spain) Dani Sordo
2 (31 MAY)	SS11	15:10	Aghii Theodori 2	32.16 km	(Finland) Mikko Hirvonen	22:36.1	(Spain) Dani Sordo
2 (31 MAY)	SS12	15:53	Pissia 2	16.6 km	(Estonia) Urmo Aava	12:13.9	(France) Sébastien Loeb
2 (31 MAY)	SS13	17:21	Aghia Triada 2	10.8 km	(Finland) Mikko Hirvonen	7:45.4	(France) Sébastien Loeb
3 (1 JUN)	SS14	06:53	Avlonas 1	15.14 km	(Australia) Chris Atkinson	9:09.6	(France) Sébastien Loeb
3 (1 JUN)	SS15	07:32	Assopia 1	18.52 km	(Finland) Jari-Matti Latvala	11:39.9	(France) Sébastien Loeb
3 (1 JUN)	SS16	08:35	Aghia Sotira 1	15.2 km	(Italy) Gigi Galli	9:47.2	(France) Sébastien Loeb
3 (1 JUN)	SS17	11:17	Avlonas 2	15.14 km	(Italy) Gigi Galli	9:00.9	(France) Sébastien Loeb
3 (1 JUN)	SS18	11:56	Assopia 2	18.52 km	(Finland) Jari-Matti Latvala	11:26.6	(France) Sébastien Loeb
3 (1 JUN)	SS19	12:59	Aghia Sotira 2	15.2 km	(Finland) Jari-Matti Latvala	9:52.2	(France) Sébastien Loeb
3 (1 JUN)	SS20	14:30	Tatoi 2	4.6 km	(Spain) Dani Sordo	3:33.0	(France) Sébastien Loeb
