= 2008 Jordan Rally =

Rallying motorsport event

2008 Jordan Rally 26th Jordan Rally
Round 5 of the 2008 World Rally Championship
← Previous event	Next event →
- Host country: Jordan
- Rally base: Amman, Jordan
- Dates run: April 24 – 27 2008
- Stages: 22 (359.26 km; 223.23 miles)
- Stage surface: Gravel
- Overall distance: 983.44 km (611.08 miles)

Statistics
- Crews: 55 at start, 33 at finish

Overall results
- Overall winner: (Finland) Mikko Hirvonen (United Kingdom) BP Ford World Rally Team

The 2008 Jordan Rally was the fifth round of 2008 World Rally Championship season and the third gravel round of the championship and also the second round of the Junior World Rally Championship. The event began with a ceremonial start on Thursday, April 24 in Amman, Jordan, near the Dead Sea.

== Results ==
Pos.	Driver	Co-driver	Car	Time	Difference	Points
WRC
1.	(Finland) Mikko Hirvonen	(Finland) Jarmo Lehtinen	Ford Focus RS WRC 07	4:02:47.9	0.0	10
2.	(Spain) Dani Sordo	(Spain) Marc Martí	Citroën C4 WRC	4:04:03.6	1:15.7	8
3.	(Australia) Chris Atkinson	(Belgium) Stéphane Prévot	Subaru Impreza WRC 07	4:07:47.4	4:59.5	6
4.	(Norway) Henning Solberg	(Norway) Cato Menkerud	Ford Focus RS WRC 07	4:10:23.7	7:35.8	5
5.	(United Kingdom) Matthew Wilson	(United Kingdom) Scott Martin	Ford Focus RS WRC 07	4:13:29.6	10:41.7	4
6.	(Argentina) Federico Villagra	(Argentina) Jorge Pérez Companc	Ford Focus RS WRC 07	4:14:10.1	11:22.2	3
7.	(Finland) Jari-Matti Latvala	(Finland) Miikka Anttila	Ford Focus RS WRC 07	4:15:03.5	12:15.6	2
8.	(Italy) Gigi Galli	(Italy) Giovanni Bernacchini	Ford Focus RS WRC 07	4:15:12.3	12:24.4	1
JWRC
1. (11.)	(France) Sébastien Ogier	(France) Julien Ingrassia	Citroën C2 S1600	4:29:57.8	0.0	10
2. (13.)	(Republic of Ireland) Shaun Gallagher	(Republic of Ireland) Michael Morrissey	Citroën C2 S1600	4:34:57.9	5:00.1	8
3. (14.)	(Luxembourg) Gilles Schammel	(Belgium) Renaud Jamoul	Renault Clio R3	4:37:29.4	7:31.6	6

== Special stages ==
All dates and times are EEST (UTC+3).

Day	Stage	Time	Name	Length	Winner	Time	Avg. spd.	Rally leader
1 (25 APR)	SS1	08:19	Suwayma 1	13.03 km	(Spain) D. Sordo (Norway) P. Solberg	6:40.2	117.2 km/h	(Spain) D. Sordo (Norway) P. Solberg
1 (25 APR)	SS2	08:53	Mahes 1	20.00 km	(Spain) D. Sordo	13:54.8	86.2 km/h	(Spain) D. Sordo
1 (25 APR)	SS3	09:38	Mount Nebo 1	11.10 km	(Spain) D. Sordo	8:02.9	82.8 km/h	(Spain) D. Sordo
1 (25 APR)	SS4	10:25	Mal'n 1	13.46 km	(France) S. Loeb	9:55.4	81.4 km/h	(Spain) D. Sordo
1 (25 APR)	SS5	12:35	Suwayma 2	13.03 km	(Finland) J. Latvala	6:37.7	117.7 km/h	(Spain) D. Sordo
1 (25 APR)	SS6	13:09	Mahes 2	20.00 km	(France) S. Loeb	13:38.5	88.0 km/h	(Spain) D. Sordo
1 (25 APR)	SS7	13:54	Mount Nebo 2	11.1 km	(France) S. Loeb	7:52.6	84.6 km/h	(Spain) D. Sordo
1 (25 APR)	SS8	14:41	Mal'n 2	13.46 km	(Finland) M. Hirvonen	9:46.7	82.6 km/h	(Spain) D. Sordo
2 (26 APR)	SS9	8:53	Tirki 1	13.46 km	(France) S. Loeb	8:18.1	102.1 km/h	(France) S. Loeb
2 (26 APR)	SS10	09:21	Erak Elimir 1	12.47 km	(France) S. Loeb	8:40.9	86.2 km/h	(France) S. Loeb
2 (26 APR)	SS11	10:24	Shuna 1	15:19 km	(France) S. Loeb	11:54.9	76.5 km/h	(France) S. Loeb
2 (26 APR)	SS12	11:05	Baptism Site 1	13.13 km	(Spain) D. Sordo	6:42.2	117.5 km/h	(Spain) D. Sordo
2 (26 APR)	SS13	13:06	Turki 2	14.13 km	(Finland) M. Hirvonen	8:15.7	102.6 km/h	(Finland) J. Latvala
2 (26 APR)	SS14	13:34	Erak Elimir 2	12.47 km	(Italy) G. Galli	8:40.8	86.2 km/h	(Finland) J. Latvala
2 (26 APR)	SS15	14:37	Shuna 2	15.19 km	(Italy) G. Galli	11:57.8	76.2 km/h	(Finland) J. Latvala
2 (26 APR)	SS16	15:18	Baptism Site 2	13.13 km	(Italy) G. Galli	6:41.2	117.8 km/h	(Spain) D. Sordo
3 (27APR)	SS17	07:37	Kafrain 1	16.49 km	(Finland) M. Hirvonen	11:02.5	89.6 km/h	(Finland) J. Latvala
3 (27APR)	SS18	08:10	Wadi Shueib 1	9.18 km	(France) S. Loeb	7:10.1	76.8 km/h	(Finland) M. Hirvonen
3 (27APR)	SS19	09:13	Jordan River 1	41.45 km	(France) S. Loeb	28:32.8	87.1 km/h	(Finland) M. Hirvonen
3 (27APR)	SS20	11:30	Kafrain 2	16.49 km	(Finland) J. Latvala	11:00.4	89.9 km/h	(Finland) M. Hirvonen
3 (27APR)	SS21	12:03	Wadi Shueib 2	9.18 km	(France) S. Loeb	7:04.8	77.8 km/h	(Finland) M. Hirvonen
3 (27APR)	SS22	13:06	Jordan River 2	41.45 km	(Finland) M. Hirvonen	28:09.1	88.3 km/h	(Finland) M. Hirvonen
