= 2008 Rally Argentina =

Fourth round of 35th season in the FIA World Rally Championship

2008 Rally Argentina 28º Rally Argentina
Round 4 of the 2008 World Rally Championship
← Previous event	Next event →
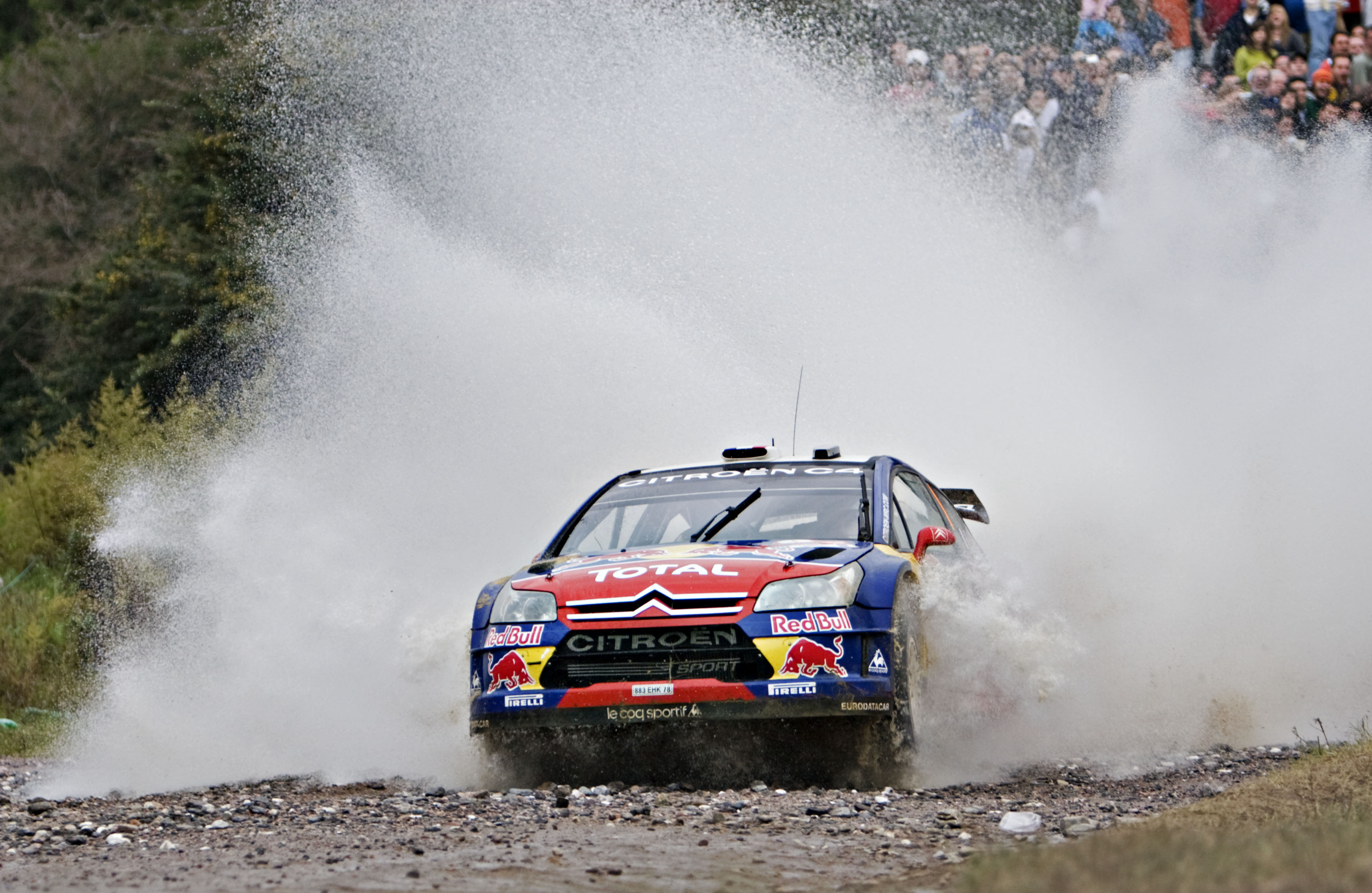
- Sébastien Loeb driving his Citroën C4 WRC.
- Host country: Argentina
- Rally base: Córdoba, Argentina
- Dates run: March 28 – 30 2008
- Stages: 21 (352.07 km; 218.77 miles)
- Stage surface: Gravel
- Overall distance: 1,619.45 km (1,006.28 miles)

Statistics
- Crews: 56 at start, 31 at finish

Overall results
- Overall winner: (France) Sébastien Loeb (France) Citroën Total World Rally Team

The 2008 Rally Argentina, officially 28º Rally Argentina, is the fourth round of 2008 World Rally Championship season; it is a second gravel round of the championship and also the second round of the Production World Rally Championship. The event began with a ceremonial start on Thursday, March 27 in Córdoba and ended after a Super Special Stage and ten minutes service "E" in Villa Carlos Paz.

Some stages of the rally, especially the ones from final day, similarly to those seen on the Mexican event, are held in the mountainous area of the country, thus drivers climb up to 2100 meters above sea levels. The event, however, is more varied and some competitive kilometers lead through vast Argentinian plains.

== Summary ==
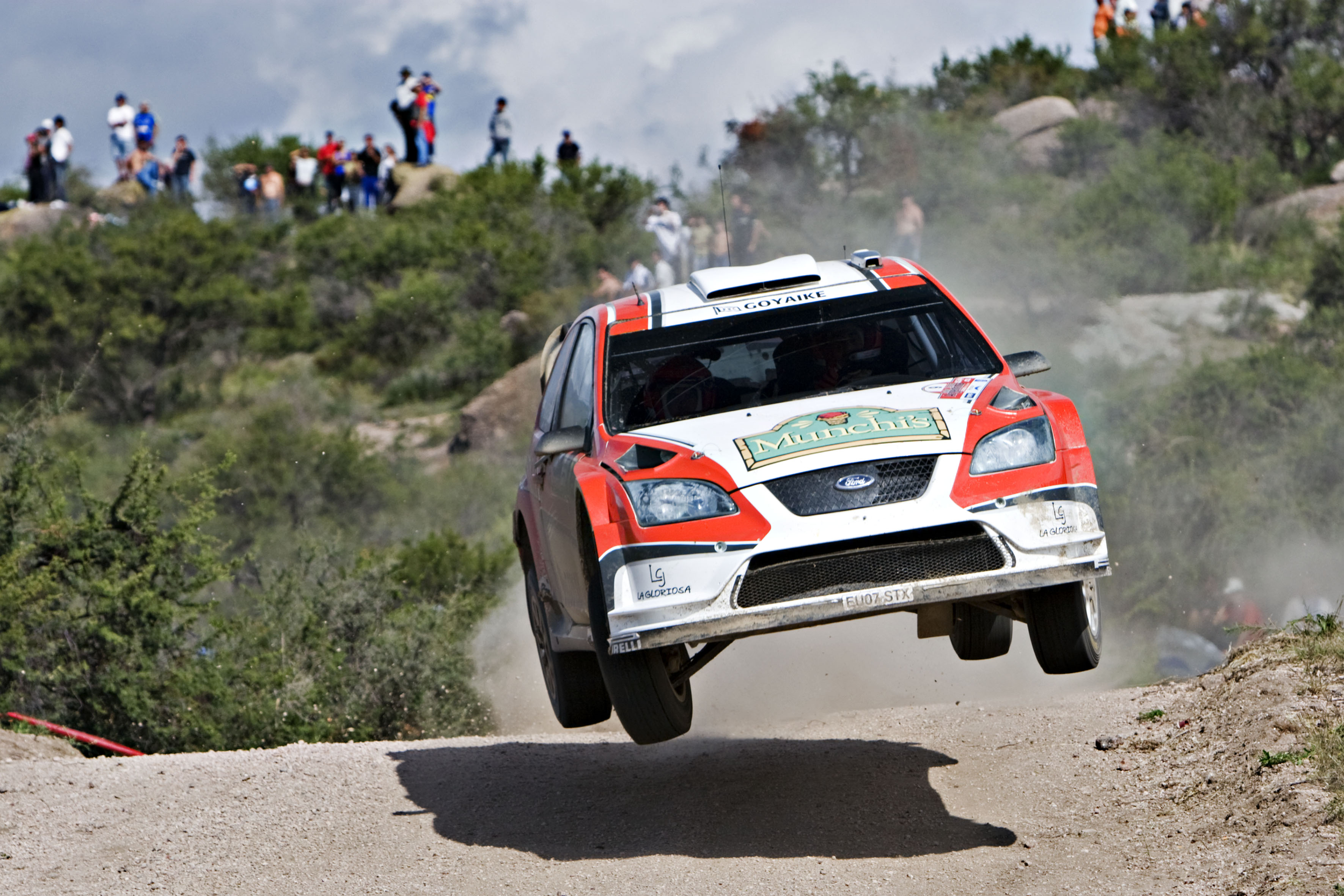
Home country's Federico Villagra driving a Ford Focus WRC.

The rally began in rainy and muddy conditions. Mikko Hirvonen was the first on the road as the championship leader and managed to open up a 48-second gap to Jari-Matti Latvala and a 50-second gap to Sébastien Loeb. However, the BP Ford drivers soon dropped out of contention. On the second stage, Latvala spun off and lost about nine minutes, and on the fifth stage, Hirvonen and Stobart VK M-Sport Ford's Henning Solberg damaged their cars while hitting rocks and retired from the rally. Loeb managed to open up a comfortable gap to Subaru's Chris Atkinson and Petter Solberg. Other drivers in the points after day one were Gigi Galli, Dani Sordo, Federico Villagra, Matthew Wilson and Latvala.

Loeb continued to lead throughout day two, and Solberg passed his teammate Atkinson for second place. Galli retired from fourth place to preserve his vehicle when smoke started to pour from his Ford Focus after SS13. Latvala also had problems with his Focus and retired. After day two, due to the high level of attrition, Sordo was now in fourth place, Conrad Rautenbach had climbed to fifth, Hirvonen, who re-joined the event under SupeRally rules, to sixth and Andreas Aigner to seventh. Villagra was in eighth place.

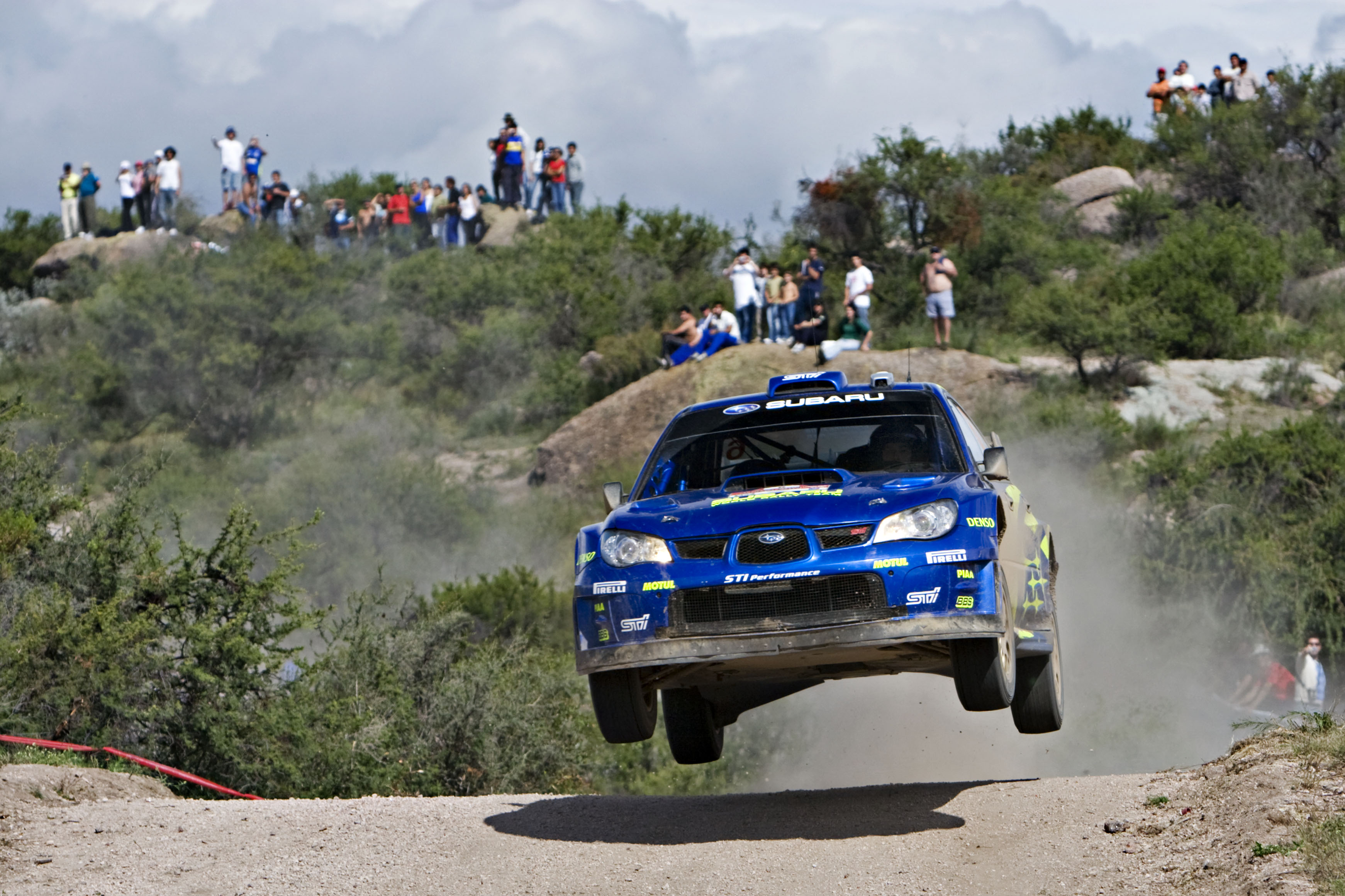
Chris Atkinson driving a Subaru Impreza WRC.

French World Rally Champion held his lead until the very end of the event and won the event with over two and a half minute advantage over the Subaru driver, Atkinson. The young Australian's steady pace paid off and he was able to claim second place after electric in Petter Solberg's car malfunctioned and he had to retire. Petter's brother, Henning, didn't manage to finish either - shock absorber in older Solberg's Focus was blown through the hood again, same way as on Friday, and he ended his rally at the very same spot as his younger sibling.

The last man on the podium was second Citroën driver, Dani Sordo, followed by Conrad Rautenbach in another C4 WRC, who was therefore first Zimbabwean to ever score points in an WRC event. Fifth was Ford's Mikko Hirvonen who managed to score four points in drivers' and five in manufacturers' championship despite massive penalties for using SupeRally. Last three pointing drivers were Munchi's Federico Villagra, Stobart's Gigi Galli, who also restarted under SupeRally format and Andreas Aigner driving a group N Mitsubishi Lancer Evolution IX. He was also first in PWRC classification, followed by Argentinian Sebastián Beltrán and Finn Jari Ketomaa.

== Results ==
Pos.	Driver	Co-driver	Car	Time	Difference	Points
WRC
1.	(France) Sébastien Loeb	(Monaco) Daniel Elena	Citroën C4 WRC	4:05:48.6	0.0	10
2.	(Australia) Chris Atkinson	(Belgium) Stéphane Prévot	Subaru Impreza WRC 07	4:08:21.8	2:33.2	8
3.	(Spain) Dani Sordo	(Spain) Marc Martí	Citroën C4 WRC	4:09:53.3	4:04.7	6
4.	(Zimbabwe) Conrad Rautenbach	(United Kingdom) David Senior	Citroën C4 WRC	4:25:52.1	20:03.5	5
5.	(Finland) Mikko Hirvonen	(Finland) Jarmo Lehtinen	Ford Focus RS WRC 07	4:31:03.9	25:15.3	4
6.	(Argentina) Federico Villagra	(Argentina) Jorge Pérez Companc	Ford Focus RS WRC 07	4:33:30.6	27:42.0	3
7.	(Italy) Gigi Galli	(Italy) Giovanni Bernacchini	Ford Focus RS WRC 07	4:33:40.4	27:51.8	2
8.	(Austria) Andreas Aigner	(Germany) Klaus Wicha	Mitsubishi Lancer Evo IX	4:34:47.9	28:59.3	1
PCWRC
1. (8.)	(Austria) Andreas Aigner	(Germany) Klaus Wicha	Mitsubishi Lancer Evo IX	4:34:47.9	0.0	10
2. (9.)	(Argentina) Sebastián Beltrán	(Cuba) Ricardo Rojas	Mitsubishi Lancer Evo IX	4:35:53.5	+1:05.6	8
3. (10.)	(Finland) Jari Ketomaa	(Finland) Miika Teiskonen	Subaru Impreza N12	4:37:41.2	+2:53.3	6
4. (11.)	(Japan) Fumio Nutahara	(United Kingdom) Daniel Barritt	Mitsubishi Lancer Evolution IX	4:38:47.0	+3:59.1	5
5. (12.)	(Estonia) Martin Rauam	(Estonia) Silver Kutt	Mitsubishi Lancer Evolution IX	4:44:16.0	+9:28.1	4
6. (13.)	(Jordan) Amjad Farrah	(Italy) Nicola Arena	Mitsubishi Lancer Evolution IX	4:53:04.4	+18:16.5	3
7. (14.)	(Czech Republic) Martin Prokop	(Czech Republic) Jan Tománek	Mitsubishi Lancer Evolution IX	4:53:07.8	+18:19.9	2
8. (18.)	(Portugal) Bernardo Sousa	(Portugal) Jorge Carvalho	Mitsubishi Lancer Evolution IX	5:13:02.4	+38:14.5	1

== Special stages ==
All dates and times are ART (UTC-3).

Day	Stage	Time^{[A]}	Name	Length	Winner	Time	Avg. spd.	Rally leader
1 (28 MAR)	SS1	07:45	La Cumbre - Agua de Oro 1	18.70 km	(Finland) M. Hirvonen	16:29.3	68.0 km/h	(Finland) M. Hirvonen
1 (28 MAR)	SS2	08:41	Ascochinga - La Cumbre 1	23.28 km	(Finland) M. Hirvonen	14:59.6	93.2 km/h	(Finland) M. Hirvonen
1 (28 MAR)	SS3	09:44	Capilla del Monte - San Marcos 1	22.95 km	(Finland) J. Latvala	17:39.7	78.0 km/h	(Finland) M. Hirvonen
1 (28 MAR)	SS4	10:16	San Marcos - Charbonier 1	9.61 km	(Finland) M. Hirvonen	6:38.3	86.9 km/h	(Finland) M. Hirvonen
1 (28 MAR)	SS5	14:26	Ascochinga - La Cumbre 2	23.28 km	(France) S. Loeb	14:51.3	94.0 km/h	(France) S. Loeb
1 (28 MAR)	SS6	15:29	Capilla del Monte - San Marcos 2	22.95 km	(Finland) J. Latvala	17:23.1	79.2 km/h	(France) S. Loeb
1 (28 MAR)	SS7	16:01	San Marcos - Charbonier 2	9.61 km	(Italy) G. Galli	6:33.5	87.9 km/h	(France) S. Loeb
1 (28 MAR)	SS8	17:04	La Cumbre - Agua de Oro 2	18.70 km	(Finland) J. Latvala	17:02.3	65.9 km/h	(France) S. Loeb
1 (28 MAR)	SS9	18:45	Camping San Martin 1	3.50 km	(Australia) C. Atkinson	1:39.4	126.8 km/h	(France) S. Loeb
2 (29 MAR)	SS10	08:05	Santa Monica - Amboy 1	22.17 km	(Norway) P. Solberg	12:02.7	110.4 km/h	(France) S. Loeb
2 (29 MAR)	SS11	08:57	Villa del Dique - Las Bajadas 1	16.41 km	(France) S. Loeb	9:10.0	107.4 km/h	(France) S. Loeb
2 (29 MAR)	SS12	09:35	San Augustin - Villa General Belgrano 1	16.31 km	(France) S. Loeb	11:26.5	85.5 km/h	(France) S. Loeb
2 (29 MAR)	SS13	10:20	Santa Rosa - San Augustin 1	21.41 km	(Australia) C. Atkinson	13:37.3	94.3 km/h	(France) S. Loeb
2 (29 MAR)	SS14	14:25	Santa Monica - Amboy 2	22.17 km	(Norway) P. Solberg	11:37.2	114.5 km/h	(France) S. Loeb
2 (29 MAR)	SS15	15:17	Villa del Dique - Las Bajadas 2	16.41 km	(France) S. Loeb	8:57.8	109.8 km/h	(France) S. Loeb
2 (29 MAR)	SS16	15:55	San Augustin - Villa General Belgrano 2	16.31 km	(Norway) P. Solberg	11:18.8	86.5 km/h	(France) S. Loeb
2 (29 MAR)	SS17	16:40	Santa Rosa - San Augustin 2	21.41 km	(Norway) P. Solberg	13:23.6	95.9 km/h	(France) S. Loeb
2 (29 MAR)	SS18	18:45	Camping San Martin 2	3.50 km	(Norway) P. Solberg	1:40.6	125.2 km/h	(France) S. Loeb
3 (30 MAR)	SS19	09:13	Mina Clavero - Giulio Cesare	24.70 km	(Finland) J. Latvala	19:57.9	74.2 km/h	(France) S. Loeb
3 (30 MAR)	SS20	10:05	El Condor - Copina	16.06 km	(France) S. Loeb	15:08.6	63.6 km/h	(France) S. Loeb
3 (30 MAR)	SS21	11:50	Camping San Martin 3	2.63 km	(Finland) J. Latvala	2:13.3	71.0 km/h	(France) S. Loeb

Footnotes:A all times local

== Championship standings after the event ==
=== Drivers' championship ===
Pos	Driver	MON (Monaco)	SWE (Sweden)	MEX (Mexico)	ARG (Argentina)	JOR (Jordan)	ITA (Italy)	GRC (Greece)	TUR (Turkey)	FIN (Finland)	GER (Germany)	NZL (New Zealand)	ESP (Spain)	FRA (France)	JPN (Japan)	GBR (United Kingdom)	Pts
1	(France) Sébastien Loeb	1	Ret.	1	1												30
2	(Finland) Mikko Hirvonen	2	2	4	5												25
3	(Australia) Chris Atkinson	3	21	2	2												22
4	(Finland) Jari-Matti Latvala	12	1	3	15												16
5	(Italy) Gigi Galli	6	3	Ret.	7												11
6	(Norway) Petter Solberg	5	4	12	Ret.												9
6	(Spain) Dani Sordo	11	6	17	3												9
8	(Belgium) François Duval	4															5
8	(Zimbabwe) Conrad Rautenbach	Ret.	16	16	4												5
8	(Argentina) Federico Villagra			7	6												5
11	(Norway) Henning Solberg	9	13	5	Ret.												4
11	(Norway) Andreas Mikkelsen		5														4
13	(United Kingdom) Matthew Wilson	10	Ret.	6	Ret.												3
14	(France) Jean-Marie Cuoq	7															2
14	(Finland) Toni Gardemeister	Ret.	7	Ret.	Ret.												2
16	(Sweden) Per-Gunnar Andersson	8	Ret.	Ret.	24												1
16	(Finland) Juho Hänninen		8														1
16	(France) Sébastien Ogier			8													1
16	(Austria) Andreas Aigner		31		8												1
Pos	Driver	MON (Monaco)	SWE (Sweden)	MEX (Mexico)	ARG (Argentina)	JOR (Jordan)	ITA (Italy)	GRC (Greece)	TUR (Turkey)	FIN (Finland)	GER (Germany)	NZL (New Zealand)	ESP (Spain)	FRA (France)	JPN (Japan)	GBR (United Kingdom)	Pts

Key
Colour	Result
Gold	Winner
Silver	2nd place
Bronze	3rd place
Green	Points finish
Blue	Non-points finish
Blue	Non-classified finish (NC)
Purple	Did not finish (Ret)
Black	Excluded (EX)
Black	Disqualified (DSQ)
White	Did not start (DNS)
White	Cancelled (C)
Blank	Withdrew entry from the event (WD)

=== Manufacturers' championship ===
Rank	Driver	Event															Total points
Rank	Driver	MON (Monaco)	SWE (Sweden)	MEX (Mexico)	ARG (Argentina)	JOR (Jordan)	ITA (Italy)	GRC (Greece)	TUR (Turkey)	FIN (Finland)	GER (Germany)	NZL (New Zealand)	ESP (Spain)	FRA (France)	JPN (Japan)	GBR (United Kingdom)	Total points
1	(United States) BP Ford World Rally Team	8	18	11	7	-	-	-	-	-	-	-	-	-	-	-	44
2	(France) Citroën Total World Rally Team	11	4	10	16	-	-	-	-	-	-	-	-	-	-	-	41
3	(Japan) Subaru World Rally Team	10	6	9	8	-	-	-	-	-	-	-	-	-	-	-	33
4	(United Kingdom) Stobart M-Sport Ford Rally Team	8	8	3	3	-	-	-	-	-	-	-	-	-	-	-	22
5	(Argentina) Munchi's Ford World Rally Team	0	0	6	4	-	-	-	-	-	-	-	-	-	-	-	10
6	(Japan) Suzuki World Rally Team	2	3	0	1	-	-	-	-	-	-	-	-	-	-	-	6

=== Production championship ===
Points table:

Pos	Driver	SWE (Sweden)	ARG (Argentina)	GRC (Greece)	TUR (Turkey)	FIN (Finland)	NZL (New Zealand)	JPN (Japan)	GBR (United Kingdom)	Pts
1	(Finland) Jari Ketomaa	2	3							14
2	(Austria) Andreas Aigner	11	1							10
2	(Finland) Juho Hänninen	1								10
4	(Argentina) Sebastián Beltrán		2							8
5	(Czech Republic) Martin Prokop	4	7							7
6	(Sweden) Patrik Sandell	3								6
7	(Japan) Fumio Nutahara		4							5
8	(Estonia) Martin Rauam		5							4
8	(Germany) Uwe Nittel	5	Ret							4
10	(Japan) Toshihiro Arai	6	Ret							3
10	(Jordan) Amjad Farrah		6							3
12	(Portugal) Armindo Araújo	7								2
12	(Portugal) Bernardo Sousa	8	8							2
Pos	Driver	SWE (Sweden)	ARG (Argentina)	GRC (Greece)	TUR (Turkey)	FIN (Finland)	NZL (New Zealand)	JPN (Japan)	GBR (United Kingdom)	Pts
