= Van Merksteijn Motorsport =

Racing team participant in rally and circuit racing events

(Netherlands) Van Merksteijn Motorsport
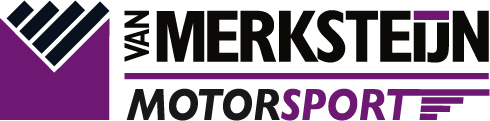
- Founded: 1985
- Team principal(s): Gerard Grouve
- Current series: World Rally Championship
- Former series: FIA GT Championship; European Le Mans Series
- Noted drivers: Peter van Merksteijn Jr. Peter van Merksteijn Sr.

Van Merksteijn Motorsport is a Dutch motorsport company active in both circuit racing and rallying. Established in 2008, under the ownership of Peter van Merksteijn Sr. and with Gerard Grouve as team principal, this motorsport company won both the LMP2 class title in the prestigious 24 Hours of Le Mans and in the gruelling the Le Mans Series in its first year of competition. Only one year later the team from Hengelo were again unbeatable when contesting the Dutch Rally Championship. For the 2011 season, the team has once more undertaken very ambitious plan: Peter van Merksteijn Jr. will compete in the World Rally Championship alongside Peter van Merksteijn Sr. driving a Citroën DS3 WRC.

== Circuit ==
Peter van Merksteijn Sr. has been active in motorsport since 1985. As of 2002, all international motorsport activities of van Merksteijn have been handled by System Force Motorsport, the predecessor of Van Merksteijn Motorsport. The newly formed team started their competition debut with a Porsche 911 GT3 RS in the FIA GT Championship with drivers Peter van Merksteijn Sr. and Phil Bastiaans and also participated in selected rounds of the Belcar Championship. The following year the team entered the 24-hour endurance races of Daytona, Spa-Francorchamps and Zolder. In 2005 it acquired a Spyker C8 Spyder GT2-R that debuted at the 12 Hours of Sebring only to retire one hour into the race due to a wheel coming loose from the car. As the Spyker factory was allocated only a single entry into the 24 Hours of Le Mans that year, the System Force Motorsport entry was placed on the reserve list with Peter van Merksteijn sharing the factory Spyker car with Tom Coronel and Donny Crevels.

After changing their name to Van Merksteijn Motorsport for the beginning of 2008 season, the team undertook programmes in both endurance circuit racing and in rallying. At the end of 2007 the team received the first Porsche RS Spyder built for the European market for participation in the 24 Hours of Le Mans. With the Porsche, the team’s aim of the project was to claim victory at the 24 Hours of Le Mans within two years and to realise a sporting dream for team owner Peter van Merksteijn. The drivers on the Van Merksteijn Motorsport Porsche RS Spyder were Peter van Merksteijn, Jos Verstappen and Jeroen Bleekemolen.

In preparation for the famous race at Le Mans, Van Merksteijn Motorsport tested twice with the Porsche RS Spyder. a private test at the Guadix circuit and a long test with a 1.000 km race simulation during the Le Mans Series pre-season test at Le Castellet. Their Porsche RS Spyder’s first race was the 1000 km of Catalunya on the Formula 1 track of Barcelona. This first round of the Le Mans Series saw the team of van Merksteijn and Verstappen claim the LMP2 class victory. The next race on the calendar was held at Monza and the team settled for second place after their car sustained damage as a result of a collision with a Spyker and having lost valuable time in the pits for repairs. The third race of the season, the 1000 km of Spa-Francorchamps, produced another victory for the all Dutch team. Van Merksteijn was not able to start in the fourth race of the championship at the Nürburgring as he took in the WRC Rallye Deutschland that was held in nearby Trier at the same time. With replacement driver Jeroen Bleekemolen in the Porsche RS Spyder alongside Verstappen, Van Merksteijn Motorsport clinched another victory. Verstappen secured the Driver’s Championship in the LMP2 class with one race remaining on the calendar. The final race of the championship provided Van Merksteijn and Verstappen with another victory and added the Le Mans Series LMP2 title for Teams to their list of successes that season. Highlighting their speed, the Porsche of Van Merksteijn Motorsport claimed the fastest race lap and pole position on every event.

== Le Mans ==
The 2008 edition of the 24 Hours of Le Mans was the main objective of the Porsche RS Spyder project for Van Merksteijn Motorsport. The team made its Le Mans debut in June on the Circuit de la Sarthe for the most famous race in the world with drivers Van Merksteijn, Verstappen and Bleekemolen. During the test session prior to the Le Mans race, the team proved to be the fastest of the LMP2 cars and this was underlined when Verstappen claimed another LMP2 pole position during the qualifying for the race. The Porsche RS Spyder started from 14th position on the start grid and left nine faster LMP1 cars behind him. Bleekemolen was chosen to start the race in the Porsche and was locked in a fierce battle early on in the race with the Porsche of Team Essex. Late in the evening the Van Merksteijn Motorsport car was handed over to Verstappen again and after doing a run of no less than four stints the team had built a considerable lead over the rest of the field. Team owner Van Merksteijn, driving with his characteristic white helmet, was given the honour to drive his car to the finish line and thereby take the LMP2 victory in the biggest race for his team with a lead of over 7 laps to runners up, Team Essex. The victory of Van Merksteijn Motorsport is a unique achievement as it was the first time a Dutch team had won the 24 Hours of Le Mans.

== Rallying ==
Since 2007 Van Merksteijn Motorsport has once again been actively involved in rallying. Van Merksteijn, Jr., in his debut in rallying, won the 2007 Dutch Rally Championship’s group N class with the Belgian co-driver Eddy Chevaillier. In that same year the team from Hengelo, took delivery of a Ford Focus RS WRC 06, the first WRC car of the new generation Ford Focus to be delivered by M-Sport to a customer team. In the 2007 Rallye Deutschland, Van Merksteijn, Sr. made his comeback to the sport in the Focus RS WRC. During the same event Van Merksteijn, Jr. made his WRC debut with a Group N Mitsubishi Lancer Evolution IX. Later that year father and son Van Merksteijn competed in the Rally Catalunya and the Wales Rally GB.

Regardless of the activities of Van Merksteijn in the Le Mans Series with the Porsche RS Spyder, the team entered a select number of WRC events in 2008. Their rally campaign started in Karlstad for the 2008 Swedish Rally followed up in May, immediately after the Le Mans Series race at Spa-Francorchamps, with the Rally d’Italia Sardegna. In July the team took delivery of a second WRC car, this time the Ford Focus RS WRC 07, again the first new-generation to be delivered to a customer team by M-Sport. This enabled Van Merksteijn, Jr. to make the switch to the Focus that his father had previously driven. In this setup Van Merksteijn Motorsport started the Rally Deutschland and the Rally Catalunya.

After achieving its sole objective of 2008 by winning the 24 Hours of Le Mans, Van Merksteijn Motorsport sold their Porsche RS Spyder to focus primarily on rallying. In 2009 the team was involved in the Dutch Rally Championship with Bernhard Ten Brinke. Van Merksteijn Motorsport trained the rookie rally driver and quickly prepared Ten Brinke to drive the Focus WRC with co-driver Hans van Goor at the front of the strong Dutch entry list. Once again Van Merksteijn Motorsport created a champion who would win the national title in his first year in the sport. Internationally the team was active but with a reduced calendar that only saw the team enter the Rally Norway and Rally Portugal.

In 2010 Van Merksteijn Motorsport entered the Rally Sweden for the second time, the favorite event of father and son Van Merksteijn, where they both drove Ford Focus RS WRC cars. Later that year during the Rallye Deutschland Bernhard Ten Brinke made his WRC debut. The Dutch Champion driving the Focus with co-driver Eddy Chevaillier recorded an amazing result by finishing in 12th position overall in Trier. In Rally Sweden, Rally de Portugal and Wales Rally GB Van Merksteijn Motorsport was also present in a support role for Ipatec Racing as organizers and managers of their WRC activities.

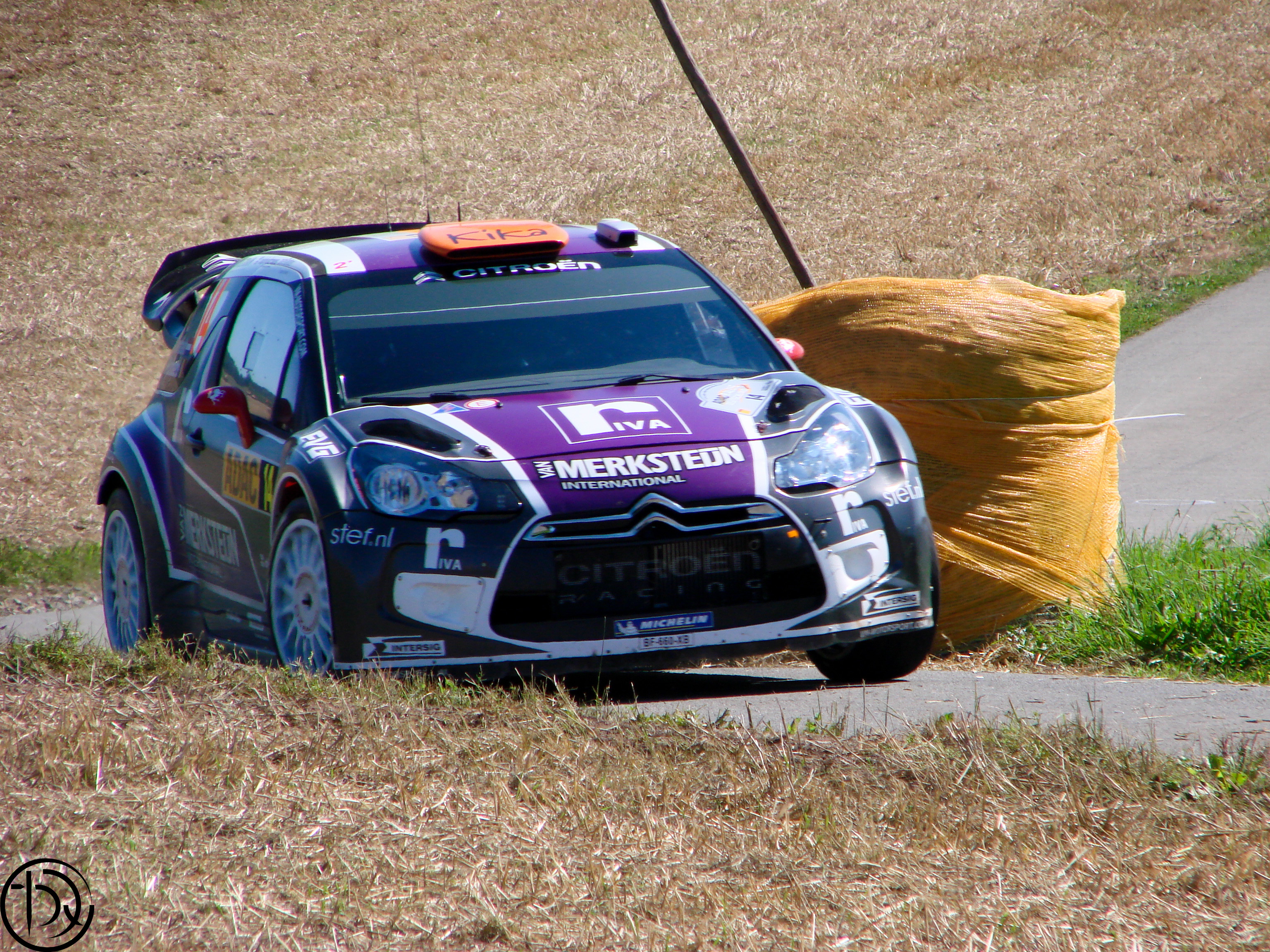
Peter van Merksteijn Jr. at the 2011 Rallye Deutschland

For the 2011 season the team announced ambitious plans. Van Merksteijn Motorsport will enter the World Rally Championship as a private WRC team with a Citroën DS3 WRC. Van Merksteijn, Jr. will start in ten rounds of the Championship and father Van Merksteijn, Sr. intends to drive in a second DS3 in three WRC events. It is unique that a private Dutch team will have the latest specification WRC cars from Citroën.

== WRC Results ==
| Year | Entrant | Car | Driver | 1 | 2 | 3 | 4 | 5 | 6 | 7 | 8 | 9 | 10 | 11 | 12 | 13 | 14 | 15 | 16 | WDC | Points | TC | Points |
|---|---|---|---|---|---|---|---|---|---|---|---|---|---|---|---|---|---|---|---|---|---|---|---|
| 2007 | Van Merksteijn Motorsport | Ford Focus RS WRC 06 | (Netherlands) Peter van Merksteijn Sr. | MON | SWE | NOR | MEX | POR | ARG | ITA | GRE | FIN | GER; 40 | NZL | ESP; 29 | FRA | JPN | IRE | GBR; 43 | - | 0 | - | 0 |
| 2007 | Van Merksteijn Motorsport | Mitsubishi Lancer Evo IX | (Netherlands) Peter van Merksteijn Jr. | MON | SWE | NOR | MEX | POR | ARG | ITA | GRE | FIN | GER; 70 | NZL | ESP; 60 | FRA | JPN | IRE | GBR; 29 | - | 0 | - | 0 |
| 2008 | Van Merksteijn Motorsport | Ford Focus RS WRC 06 | (Netherlands) Peter van Merksteijn Sr. | MON | SWE; 23 | MEX | ARG | JOR | ITA; Ret | GRE | TUR | | | | | | | | | - | 0 | - | 0 |
| 2008 | Van Merksteijn Motorsport | Ford Focus RS WRC 07 | (Netherlands) Peter van Merksteijn Sr. | | | | | | | | | FIN | GER; 21 | NZL | ESP; Ret | FRA | JPN | GBR | | - | 0 | - | 0 |
| 2008 | Van Merksteijn Motorsport | Mitsubishi Lancer Evo IX | (Netherlands) Peter van Merksteijn Jr. | MON | SWE; Ret | MEX | ARG | JOR | ITA; Ret | GRE | TUR | | | | | | | | | - | 0 | - | 0 |
| 2008 | Van Merksteijn Motorsport | Ford Focus RS WRC 06 | (Netherlands) Peter van Merksteijn Jr. | | | | | | | | | FIN | GER; 17 | NZL | ESP; Ret | FRA | JPN | GBR | | - | 0 | - | 0 |
| 2009 | Van Merksteijn Motorsport | Ford Focus RS WRC 07 | (Netherlands) Peter van Merksteijn Sr. | IRE | NOR; 20 | CYP | POR; Ret | ARG | ITA | GRE | POL | FIN | AUS | ESP | GBR | | | | | - | 0 | - | 0 |
| 2009 | Van Merksteijn Motorsport | Ford Focus RS WRC 06 | (Netherlands) Peter van Merksteijn Jr. | IRE | NOR; 18 | CYP | POR; Ret | ARG | ITA | GRE | POL | FIN | AUS | ESP | GBR | | | | | - | 0 | - | 0 |
| 2010 | Van Merksteijn Motorsport | Ford Focus RS WRC 06 | (Netherlands) Peter van Merksteijn Sr. | SWE; 28 | MEX | JOR | TUR | NZL | POR | BUL | FIN | GER | JPN | FRA | ESP | GBR | | | | - | 0 | - | 0 |
| 2010 | Van Merksteijn Motorsport | Ford Focus RS WRC 08 | (Netherlands) Peter van Merksteijn Jr. | SWE; 17 | MEX | JOR | TUR | NZL | POR | BUL | FIN | GER | JPN | FRA | ESP | GBR | | | | - | 0 | - | 0 |
| 2010 | Van Merksteijn Motorsport | Ford Focus RS WRC 08 | (Netherlands) Bernhard ten Brinke | SWE | MEX | JOR | TUR | NZL | POR | BUL | FIN | GER; 12 | JPN | FRA | ESP | GBR | | | | - | 0 | - | 0 |
| 2011 | Van Merksteijn Motorsport | Citroën DS3 WRC | (Netherlands) Peter van Merksteijn Jr. | SWE | MEX | POR; 22 | JOR; Ret | ITA; Ret | ARG; Ret | GRE; Ret | FIN | GER; 9 | AUS; 13 | FRA; Ret | ESP; 17 | GBR; Ret | | | | 25th | 2 | 9th | 16 |
| 2011 | Van Merksteijn Motorsport | Citroën DS3 WRC | (Netherlands) Peter van Merksteijn Sr. | SWE | MEX | POR | JOR | ITA; Ret | ARG | GRE; Ret | FIN | GER | AUS | FRA | ESP | GBR | | | | - | 0 | 9th | 16 |
| 2012 | Van Merksteijn Motorsport | Citroën DS3 WRC | (Netherlands) Peter van Merksteijn Jr. | MON | SWE; 19 | MEX | POR; 10 | ARG | GRE | NZL | FIN | GER; Ret | GBR | FRA | ITA | ESP | | | | 33rd | 1 | - | 0 |
| 2012 | Van Merksteijn Motorsport | Citroën DS3 WRC | (Netherlands) Peter van Merksteijn Sr. | MON; Ret | SWE | MEX | POR | ARG | GRE | NZL | FIN | GER | GBR | FRA | ITA | ESP | | | | - | 0 | - | 0 |

== Dakar Rally ==
In entering the 2009 Dakar Rally, another wish of team owner Van Merksteijn was fulfilled. For this first Dakar Rally on the South American continent a 2009 version of the BMW X3 CC was made available to Van Merksteijn Motorsport. As part of the factory outfit X-Raid Team of Sven Quandt, Van Merksteijn achieved a tenth position on the opening day of the event. On the fifth day of the monstrous rally on the stage from Neuquen to San Raphael things took a turn for the worse near the end of the 500 kilometre long special stage. Thirty kilometres after changing both rear tyres, the rear of the X3 caught fire and the car was burnt down to its bare chassis within minutes. Even though participation in the rally for Van Merksteijn ended prematurely, part of the team remained involved in the event all the way to its finish in Buenos Aires, Argentina. The management of Van Merksteijn Motorsport was also responsible for the entry in the Dakar Rally of Ipatec Racing with driver René Kuipers finishing the Dakar 2009 in 19th place with a 2008 model of the BMW X3 CC from the X-Raid Team.
