= Peter van Merksteijn Jr. =

Dutch rally driver (born 1982)

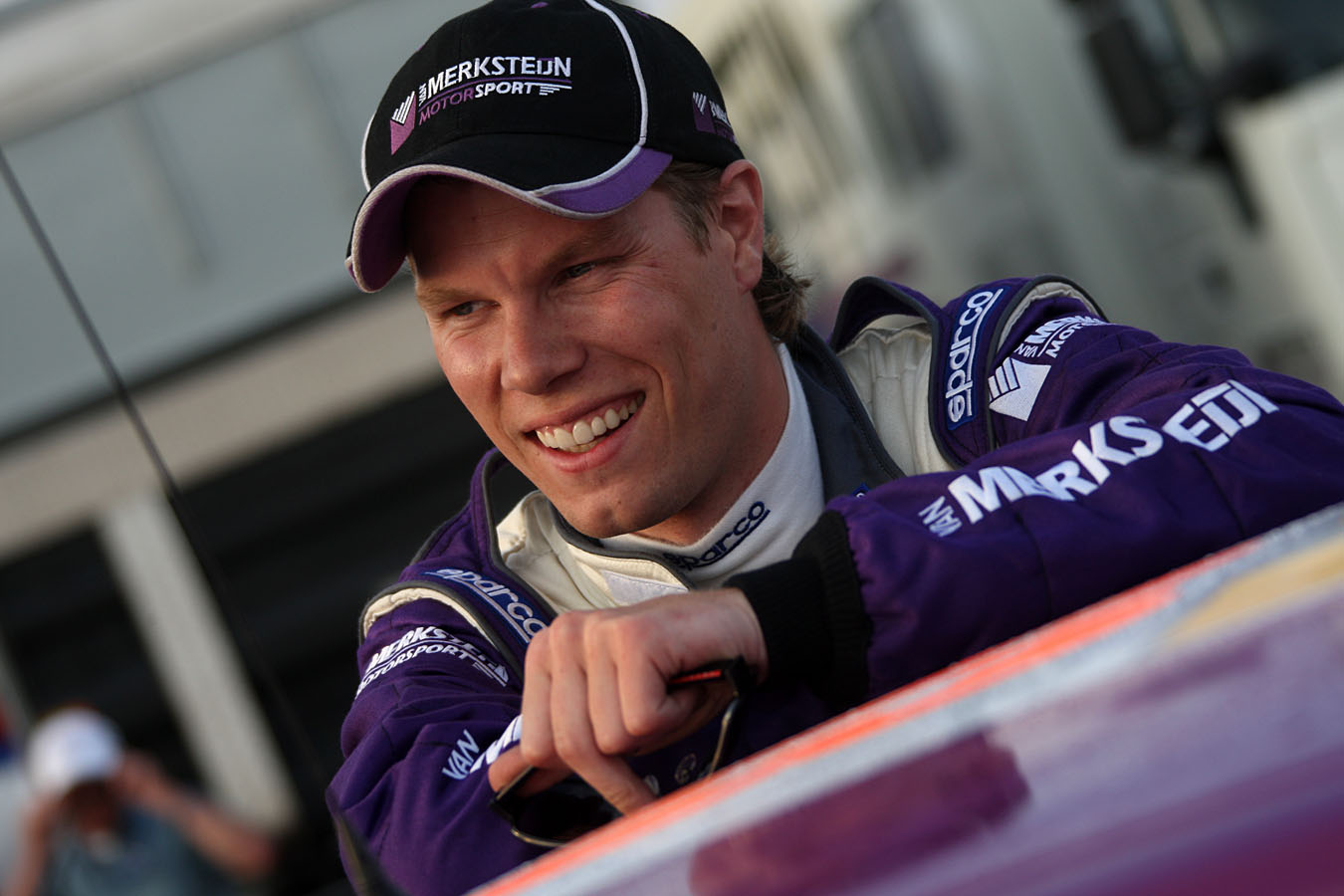
- Van Merksteijn jr. in 2008

Personal information
- Nationality: (Netherlands) Dutch
- Full name: Peter Franciscus Robertus van Merksteijn
- Born: 1 September 1982 (age 44); Hengelo, Netherlands

World Rally Championship record
- Years active: 2007–2012
- Co-driver: (Netherlands) Hans van Goor (Belgium) Eddy Chevallier (Belgium) Erwin Mombaerts
- Teams: Van Merksteijn Motorsport
- Rallies: 23
- Championships: 0
- Rally wins: 0
- Podiums: 0
- Stage wins: 0
- Total points: 3
- First rally: 2007 Rallye Deutschland
- Last rally: 2012 Rallye Deutschland

Peter Franciscus Robertus van Merksteijn (born 1 September 1982) is a Dutch racing driver and rally driver who will be driving for the Van Merksteijn Motorsport team in the 2011 World Rally Championship season. He won the Dutch Rally Championship in 2007 in the Group N class with a Mitsubishi Lancer Evolution IX. He made his WRC début in 2007 at the Rallye Deutschland. He is the son of Peter van Merksteijn Sr., who raced in the WRC before and won the 2008 24 Hours of Le Mans in the LMP2 class, using a Porsche RS Spyder.

== Career ==
=== Early Career-2007 ===
Van Merksteijn was born in Hengelo, Netherlands. He started his rallying career in 2006 with a Renault Mégane and entered in national events. With the help of his fathers team, Van Merksteijn Motorsport with team principal Gerard Grouve, he entered the 2007 Dutch Rally Championship with a Mitsubishi Lancer Evo IX. His co-driver was Francis Strikker for the start of the season but Eddy Chevaillier took Strikker's place and has been van Merksteijn's co-driver since. He won the 2007 season in the group N class.

In the same year, van Merksteijn made his WRC début at the 2007 Rallye Deutschland. He competed the rally with the Evo IX used in the Dutch Rally Championship. He finished the rally 70th overall. He also competed two other WRC events in the 2007 season, rallying in the 2007 Rally Catalunya, and used a Mitsubishi Lancer Evolution VIII for the 2007 Rally GB. He finished 29th overall in the Welsh-based round.

=== 2008-onwards ===
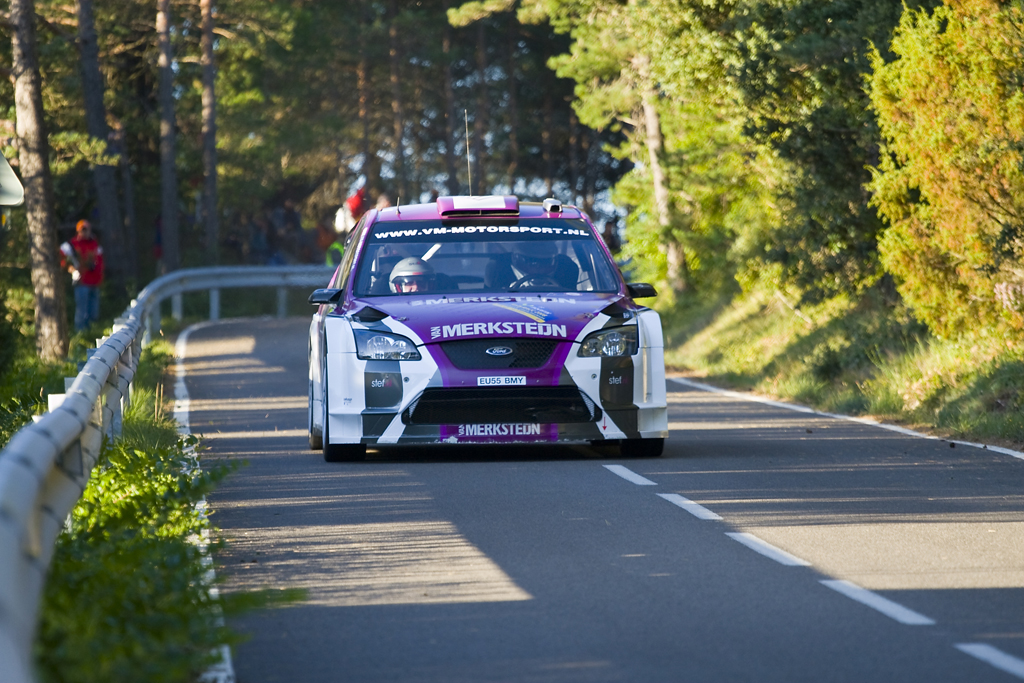
Van Merksteijn and Chevalier at the 2008 Rally Catalunya

2008 saw van Merksteijn alter between a number of cars, the Evo VIII and IX's and a Ford Focus RS WRC 06. He also used an 07-spec Focus WRC for the final Dutch Rally Championship round. He only contested in two Dutch Rally rounds, finishing second in both rounds. He contested five WRC rounds in which he only finished one round, the 2008 Rallye Deutschland, finishing 17th overall which is currently his best finish in a WRC event.

2009 was a quiet season from van Merksteijn. He entered in two Dutch events and two WRC events, finishing 18th at the 2009 Rally Norway and retired at the 2009 Rally de Portugal. In 2010 he equalled his best WRC of 17th at the 2010 Swedish Rally. It was the only rally he competed in 2010.

Van Merksteijn competed in the 2011 World Rally Championship season with Van Merksteijn Motorsport after originally been confirmed to rally for the Citroën Junior Team. He competed in all but three rounds in the next-generation Citroën DS3 WRC. He would rallying alongside father and team owner Van Merksteijn Sr.

== WRC results ==
Year	Entrant	Car	1	2	3	4	5	6	7	8	9	10	11	12	13	14	15	16	WDC	Points
2007	Peter van Merksteijn Jr.	Mitsubishi Lancer Evo IX	MON	SWE	NOR	MEX	POR	ARG	ITA	GRE	FIN	GER; 70	NZL	ESP; 60	FRA	JPN	IRE		NC	0
2007	Peter van Merksteijn Jr.	Mitsubishi Lancer Evo VIII																GBR; 29	NC	0
2008	Van Merksteijn Motorsport	Mitsubishi Lancer Evo IX	MON	SWE; Ret	MEX	ARG	JOR	ITA; Ret											NC	0
2008	Van Merksteijn Motorsport	Mitsubishi Lancer Evo VIII							GRE	TUR	FIN; DNS								NC	0
2008	Van Merksteijn Motorsport	Ford Focus RS WRC 06										GER; 17	NZL	ESP; Ret	FRA	JPN	GBR		NC	0
2009	Van Merksteijn Motorsport	Ford Focus RS WRC 06	IRE	NOR; 18	CYP	POR; Ret	ARG	ITA	GRE	POL	FIN	AUS	ESP	GBR					NC	0
2010	Van Merksteijn Motorsport	Ford Focus RS WRC 08	SWE; 17	MEX	JOR	TUR	NZL	POR	BUL	FIN	GER	JPN	FRA	ESP	GBR				NC	0
2011	Van Merksteijn Motorsport	Citroën DS3 WRC	SWE	MEX	POR; 22	JOR; Ret	ITA; Ret	ARG; Ret	GRE; Ret	FIN	GER; 9	AUS; 13	FRA; Ret	ESP; 17	GBR; Ret				25th	2
2012	Van Merksteijn Motorsport	Citroën DS3 WRC	MON	SWE; 19	MEX	POR; 10	ARG	GRE	NZL	FIN	GER; Ret	GBR	FRA	ITA	ESP				33rd	1
