= Peter van Merksteijn Sr. =

Dutch racing and rally driver (born 1956)

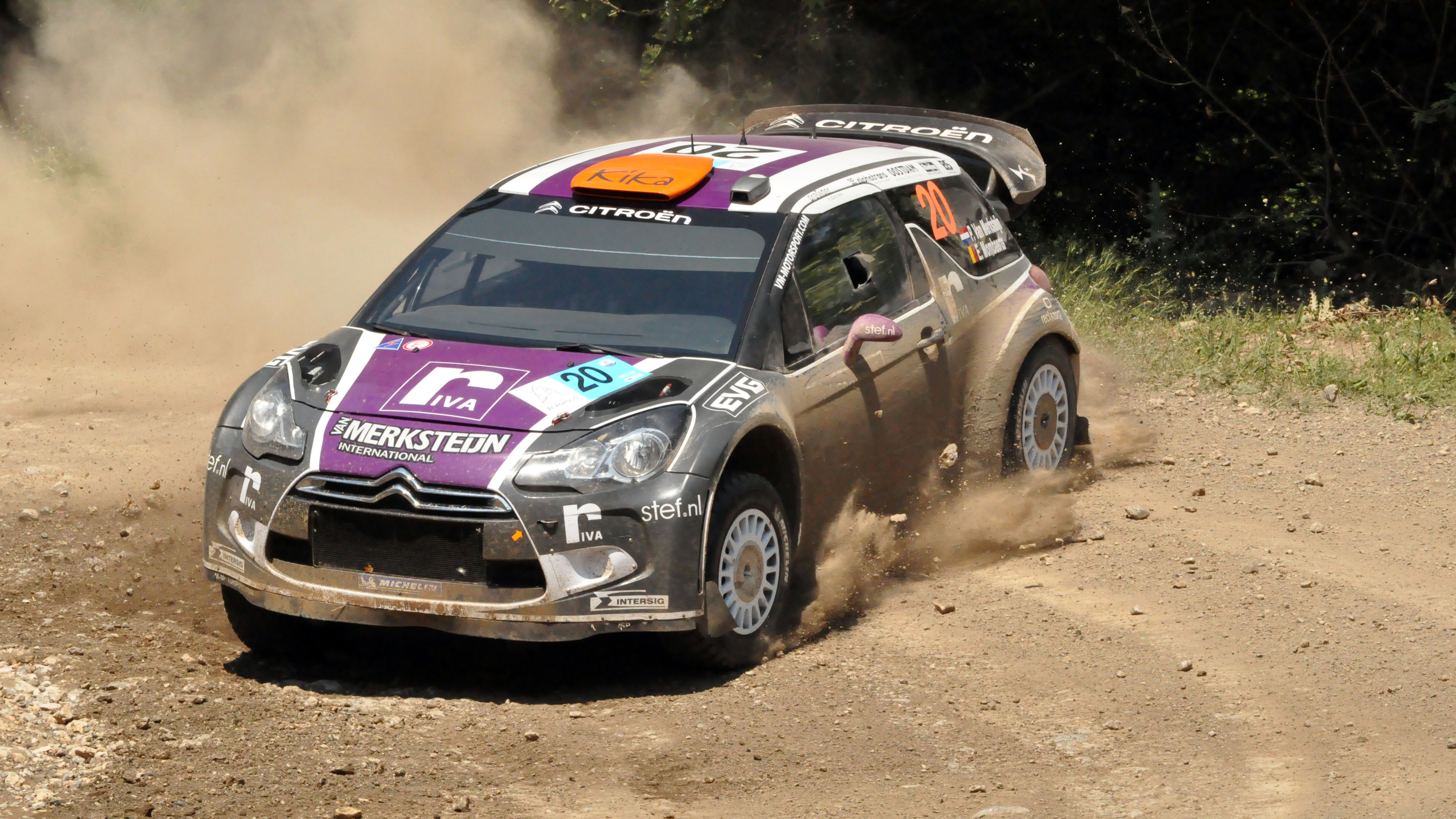
- Van Merksteijn at the 2011 Acropolis Rally

Personal information
- Nationality: (Netherlands) Dutch
- Full name: Peter Lambertus van Merksteijn
- Born: June 10, 1956 (age 70); Hengelo, Netherlands

World Rally Championship record
- Years active: 2007–2012
- Co-driver: (Netherlands) Erwin Berkhof (Netherlands) Hans van Beek (Belgium) Erwin Mombaerts (Netherlands) Hans van Goor (Belgium) Eddy Chevallier
- Teams: Van Merksteijn Motorsport
- Rallies: 12
- Championships: 0
- Rally wins: 0
- Podiums: 0
- Stage wins: 0
- Total points: 0
- First rally: 2007 Rallye Deutschland
- Last rally: 2012 Monte Carlo Rally

Peter Lambertus van Merksteijn (born 10 June 1956) is a Dutch racing driver and rally driver who drove for the Van Merksteijn Motorsport team in the 2011 World Rally Championship season with Citroën DS3 WRC. He also competed in the 24 Hours of Le Mans on three occasions, scoring a class win with co-drivers Jeroen Bleekemolen and Jos Verstappen in 2008.

== Racing record ==
=== 24 Hours of Le Mans results ===
Year	Team	Co-Drivers	Car	Class	Laps	Pos.	Class Pos.
2004	(Germany) Seikel Motorsport	(Italy) Gabrio Rosa (Italy) Alex Caffi	Porsche 911 GT3-RS	GT	148	DNF	DNF
2005	(Netherlands) Spyker Squadron	(Netherlands) Tom Coronel (Netherlands) Donny Crevels	Spyker C8 Spyder GT2-R	GT2	76	DNF	DNF
2008	(Netherlands) Van Merksteijn Motorsport	(Netherlands) Jeroen Bleekemolen (Netherlands) Jos Verstappen	Porsche RS Spyder Evo	LMP2	354	10th	1st

=== WRC results ===
Year	Entrant	Car	1	2	3	4	5	6	7	8	9	10	11	12	13	14	15	16	WDC	Points
2007	Van Merksteijn Motorsport	Ford Focus RS WRC 06	MON	SWE	NOR	MEX	POR	ARG	ITA	GRE	FIN	GER; 40	NZL	ESP; 29	FRA	JPN	IRE	GBR; 43	NC	0
2008	van Merksteijn Motorsport	Ford Focus RS WRC 06	MON	SWE; 23	MEX	ARG	JOR	ITA; Ret	GRE	TUR									NC	0
2008	van Merksteijn Motorsport	Ford Focus RS WRC 07									FIN	GER; 21	NZL	ESP; Ret	FRA	JPN	GBR		NC	0
2009	van Merksteijn Motorsport	Ford Focus RS WRC 07	IRE	NOR; 20	CYP	POR; Ret	ARG	ITA	GRE	POL	FIN	AUS	ESP	GBR					NC	0
2010	van Merksteijn Motorsport	Ford Focus RS WRC 08	SWE; 28	MEX	JOR	TUR	NZL	POR	BUL	FIN	GER	JPN	FRA	ESP	GBR				NC	0
2011	Van Merksteijn Motorsport	Citroën DS3 WRC	SWE	MEX	POR	JOR	ITA; Ret	ARG	GRE; Ret	FIN	GER	AUS	FRA	ESP	GBR				NC	0
2012	Van Merksteijn Motorsport	Citroën DS3 WRC	MON; Ret	SWE	MEX	POR	ARG	GRE	NZL	FIN	GER	GBR	FRA	ITA	ESP				NC	0
