= Gerard Grouve =

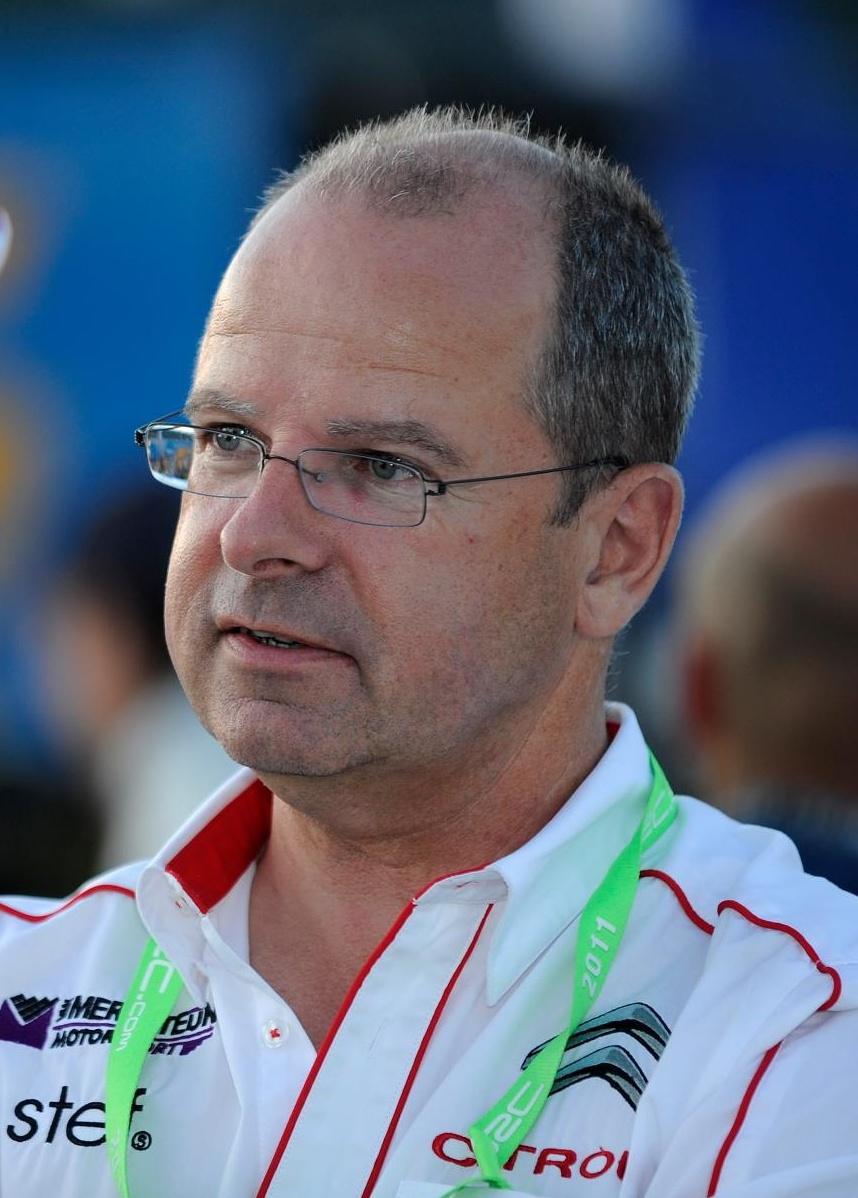
Gerard Grouve, owner of Grouve Sports Management Group

Gerard Grouve (born 13–10–1961) is owner of Grouve Sports Management Group and specialized in driver and team manager. He is best known for his role as team director of the 2008 LMP2 Le Mans winning team of Van Merksteijn Motorsport and their involvement in the World Rally Championship.

Grouve started his career in 1985 as co-driver for Peter van Merksteijn Sr. in the Audi 80 quattro and the Ford Sierra Cosworth in the Dutch rally championship. After retiring as co-driver he took the position of team manager until 1996 when Van Merksteijn switched to circuit racing.

In 2000 Grouve resumed his motorsport career as team principal of System Force Motorsport competing in the Porsche Supercup and from 2002 in Belcar, FIA GT Championship, Grand-Am 24 hours of Daytona and Le Mans Series with a Porsche 996 GT3 RS. The team ran in 2005 a Spyker C8 Spyder GT2-R during 2 races in the Le Mans Series and the ALMS 12 Hours of Sebring.

In 2008, Grouve became director of the newly formed team of Van Merksteijn Motorsport which won the 24 hours of Le Mans and the Le Mans Series in LMP2 with the Porsche RS Spyder driven by Jos Verstappen, Jeroen Bleekemolen en Peter van Merksteijn.

From 2007 through to 2011, Gerard Grouve was involved in the World Rally Championship as team manager for father and son Peter van Merksteijn. Having driven the Ford Focus WRC in 10 WRC events, the team switched in 2011 to Citroën where Grouve was responsible for their entry as an official WRC Team with the Citroën DS3 WRC.

Gerard Grouve has been involved in the start of the successful rally career of many Dutch drivers like Peter van Merksteijn Jr., Bernhard Ten Brinke and Dennis Kuipers. Under the leadership of Grouve, Van Merksteijn jr. won the Dutch championship group N in 2007, Bernhard Ten Brinke won in 2009 the Dutch championship in a Focus WRC 08 and was elected as Rookie of the Year in his first full year in the sport. Ipatec Racing with drivers René and Dennis Kuipers have called upon the experience of Gerard Grouve during their early years in the WRC for setup of their rally team and coaching of Dennis Kuipers during the start of his WRC career.

During the 2009 edition of the Dakar Rally Gerard Grouve took care of the team management for Peter van Merksteijn sr. and René Kuipers, both driving a BMW X3CC within the X-Raid team.

After parting with Van Merksteijn Motorsport as of January 2012, Gerard Grouve founded Grouve Sports Management Group, an independent management company that assist drivers and teams in motorsport with the realisation of their sporting dreams. The company also established a young driver program and is involved in sponsor finding in motorsport.

Gerard Grouve was Dutch national coach from 2013 to 2016. Started as national coach for Rally sport in 2013/2014, Gerard became in 2015 the national coach for Racing as well. In his function as national coach he has supported Dutch young talented drivers for the Dutch ASN (KNAF KNAC Nederlandse autosport Federatie) with chairman Huub Dubbelman.

Talents supported: 2013 - Leo van der Eijk, Mats van der Brand, Mike Veldhuisen (Rally) 2014 - Leo van der Eijk, Mats van der Brand (Rally), Max Verstappen (Racing) 2015 - Mats van der Brand (Rally), Larry ten Voorde (Racing)
