= Citroën C4 WRC =

World Rally Car

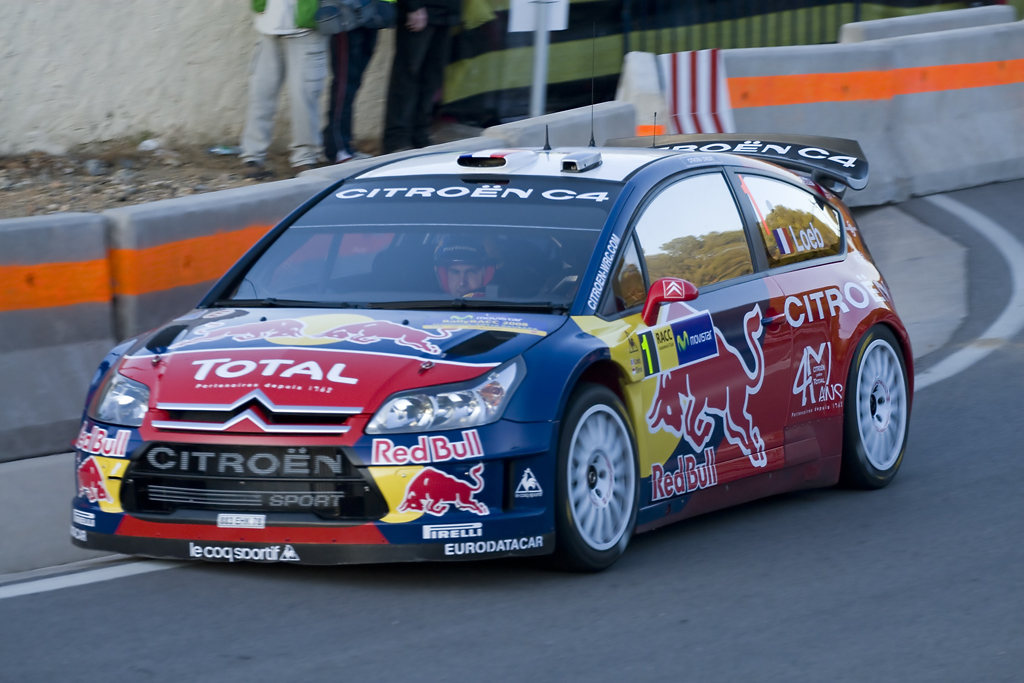
- Category: World Rally Car
- Constructor: Citroën Racing
- Designer: Xavier Mestelan-Pinon
- Predecessor: Citroën Xsara WRC
- Successor: Citroën DS3 WRC

Technical specifications
- Length: 4,274 mm (168.3 in)
- Width: 1,800 mm (70.9 in)
- Axle track: 1,598 mm (62.9 in)
- Wheelbase: 2,608 mm (102.7 in)
- Engine: PSA XU7JP4 2.0 L (122 cu in) I4 turbocharged front-engine, all-wheel-drive
- Power: 315 brake horsepower (235 kW) @ 5,500 rpm 430 pound force-feet (580 N⋅m) @ 2,750 rpm
- Weight: 1,230 kg (2,711.7 lb)

Competition history (WRC)
- Notable drivers: (France) Sébastien Loeb (France) Sébastien Ogier (Finland) Kimi Räikkönen (Norway) Petter Solberg (Spain) Daniel Sordo
- Debut: (Monaco) 2007 Monte Carlo Rally
- First win: (Monaco) 2007 Monte Carlo Rally
- Last win: (United Kingdom) 2010 Wales Rally GB
Wins	Podiums
36	87
- Constructors' Championships: 3 (2008, 2009, 2010)
- Drivers' Championships: 4 (2007, 2008, 2009, 2010)

The Citroën C4 WRC is a World Rally Car built for the Citroën World Rally Team by Citroën Racing to compete in the World Rally Championship. It is based upon the Citroën C4 road car and replaced the Citroën Xsara WRC. The car was introduced for the 2007 World Rally Championship season and took the drivers' title in all four seasons it participated in at the hands of Sébastien Loeb between 2007 and 2010, as well as the manufacturers' title in 2008, 2009 and 2010.

The C4 WRC and Loeb maintained a 100% record on asphalt events during its WRC career, winning all 13 pure asphalt rounds of the World Rally Championship.

== Competition history ==
=== 2007 ===
The car made its debut at the 2007 Monte Carlo Rally in the hands of Citroën World Rally Team drivers Sébastien Loeb and Daniel Sordo. Loeb won the rally after leading throughout, with Sordo finishing as runner-up, with the pair winning the first nine of 15 stages. Loeb went on to win seven of the remaining 15 rallies that season to beat Ford's Marcus Grönholm to the title by nine points. Sordo finished fourth in the standings.

=== 2008 ===
Citroën retained Loeb and Sordo in their team for 2008, with Loeb winning 11 out of 15 rallies to take the title, while Sordo finished third in the standings. This was enough for Citroën to regain the manufacturers' crown.

C4 WRCs were also run by privateer squad PH-Sport for Conrad Rautenbach and Urmo Aava during the season, as well as for Junior World Rally Championship winner Sébastien Ogier at the final event of the season, Rally GB. Ogier lead the event early on despite it being his first in a WRC car.

=== 2009 ===
In 2009, Loeb and Sordo once again drove for the factory squad, with Loeb winning the first five events of the year and then winning the final two to beat Ford driver Mikko Hirvonen to the title by just one point. Sordo finished a solid third as Citroën retained the manufacturers' title.

PH-Sport ran a second team of C4 WRCs under the Citroën Junior Team banner for Rautenbach and Ogier, with Evgeny Novikov, Chris Atkinson and Aaron Burkart also appearing under the banner during the year. Petter Solberg ran an old Xsara WRC for his own team for most of the season, before switching to a C4 WRC for the penultimate round, and was then entered under the Junior Team banner for the final round of the season.

=== 2010 ===
Loeb and Sordo continued with the factory team into 2010, while the Junior Team ran Ogier and Kimi Räikkönen. Ogier, though, had a strong start to the season (including a win in Portugal) and so was swapped with Sordo for gravel rounds in the second half of the season. Ogier then won the 2010 Rally Japan as a factory driver. Räikkönen achieved his first career stage win with the C4 at the 2010 Rallye Deutschland.

Petter Solberg drove a C4 WRC for his own team and picked up eight podiums over the season, finishing third in the final standings, ahead of works drivers Ogier and Sordo, and behind eventual world champion Loeb.

== WRC victories ==
No.	Event	Season	Driver	Co-driver
1	(Monaco) 2007 Monte Carlo Rally	2007	(France) Sébastien Loeb	(Monaco) Daniel Elena
2	2007 Rally Mexico	2007	(France) Sébastien Loeb	(Monaco) Daniel Elena
3	2007 Rally de Portugal	2007	(France) Sébastien Loeb	(Monaco) Daniel Elena
4	2007 Rally Argentina	2007	(France) Sébastien Loeb	(Monaco) Daniel Elena
5	(Germany) 2007 Rallye Deutschland	2007	(France) Sébastien Loeb	(Monaco) Daniel Elena
6	(Spain) 2007 Rally Catalunya	2007	(France) Sébastien Loeb	(Monaco) Daniel Elena
7	(France) 2007 Tour de Corse	2007	(France) Sébastien Loeb	(Monaco) Daniel Elena
8	(Republic of Ireland) 2007 Rally Ireland	2007	(France) Sébastien Loeb	(Monaco) Daniel Elena
9	(Monaco) 2008 Monte Carlo Rally	2008	(France) Sébastien Loeb	(Monaco) Daniel Elena
10	2008 Rally Mexico	2008	(France) Sébastien Loeb	(Monaco) Daniel Elena
11	2008 Rally Argentina	2008	(France) Sébastien Loeb	(Monaco) Daniel Elena
12	(Italy) 2008 Rally d'Italia Sardegna	2008	(France) Sébastien Loeb	(Monaco) Daniel Elena
13	(Greece) 2008 Acropolis Rally	2008	(France) Sébastien Loeb	(Monaco) Daniel Elena
14	2008 Rally Finland	2008	(France) Sébastien Loeb	(Monaco) Daniel Elena
15	(Germany) 2008 Rallye Deutschland	2008	(France) Sébastien Loeb	(Monaco) Daniel Elena
16	2008 Rally New Zealand	2008	(France) Sébastien Loeb	(Monaco) Daniel Elena
17	(Spain) 2008 Rally Catalunya	2008	(France) Sébastien Loeb	(Monaco) Daniel Elena
18	(France) 2008 Tour de Corse	2008	(France) Sébastien Loeb	(Monaco) Daniel Elena
19	(United Kingdom) 2008 Wales Rally GB	2008	(France) Sébastien Loeb	(Monaco) Daniel Elena
20	(Republic of Ireland) 2009 Rally Ireland	2009	(France) Sébastien Loeb	(Monaco) Daniel Elena
21	2009 Rally Norway	2009	(France) Sébastien Loeb	(Monaco) Daniel Elena
22	2009 Cyprus Rally	2009	(France) Sébastien Loeb	(Monaco) Daniel Elena
23	2009 Rally de Portugal	2009	(France) Sébastien Loeb	(Monaco) Daniel Elena
24	2009 Rally Argentina	2009	(France) Sébastien Loeb	(Monaco) Daniel Elena
25	(Spain) 2009 Rally Catalunya	2009	(France) Sébastien Loeb	(Monaco) Daniel Elena
26	(United Kingdom) 2009 Rally GB	2009	(France) Sébastien Loeb	(Monaco) Daniel Elena
27	2010 Rally Mexico	2010	(France) Sébastien Loeb	(Monaco) Daniel Elena
28	2010 Jordan Rally	2010	(France) Sébastien Loeb	(Monaco) Daniel Elena
29	2010 Rally of Turkey	2010	(France) Sébastien Loeb	(Monaco) Daniel Elena
30	2010 Rally de Portugal	2010	(France) Sébastien Ogier	(France) Julien Ingrassia
31	2010 Rally Bulgaria	2010	(France) Sébastien Loeb	(Monaco) Daniel Elena
32	(Germany) 2010 Rallye Deutschland	2010	(France) Sébastien Loeb	(Monaco) Daniel Elena
33	2010 Rally Japan	2010	(France) Sébastien Ogier	(France) Julien Ingrassia
34	2010 Rallye de France	2010	(France) Sébastien Loeb	(Monaco) Daniel Elena
35	(Spain) 2010 Rally Catalunya	2010	(France) Sébastien Loeb	(Monaco) Daniel Elena
36	(United Kingdom) 2010 Wales Rally GB	2010	(France) Sébastien Loeb	(Monaco) Daniel Elena

== Gallery ==
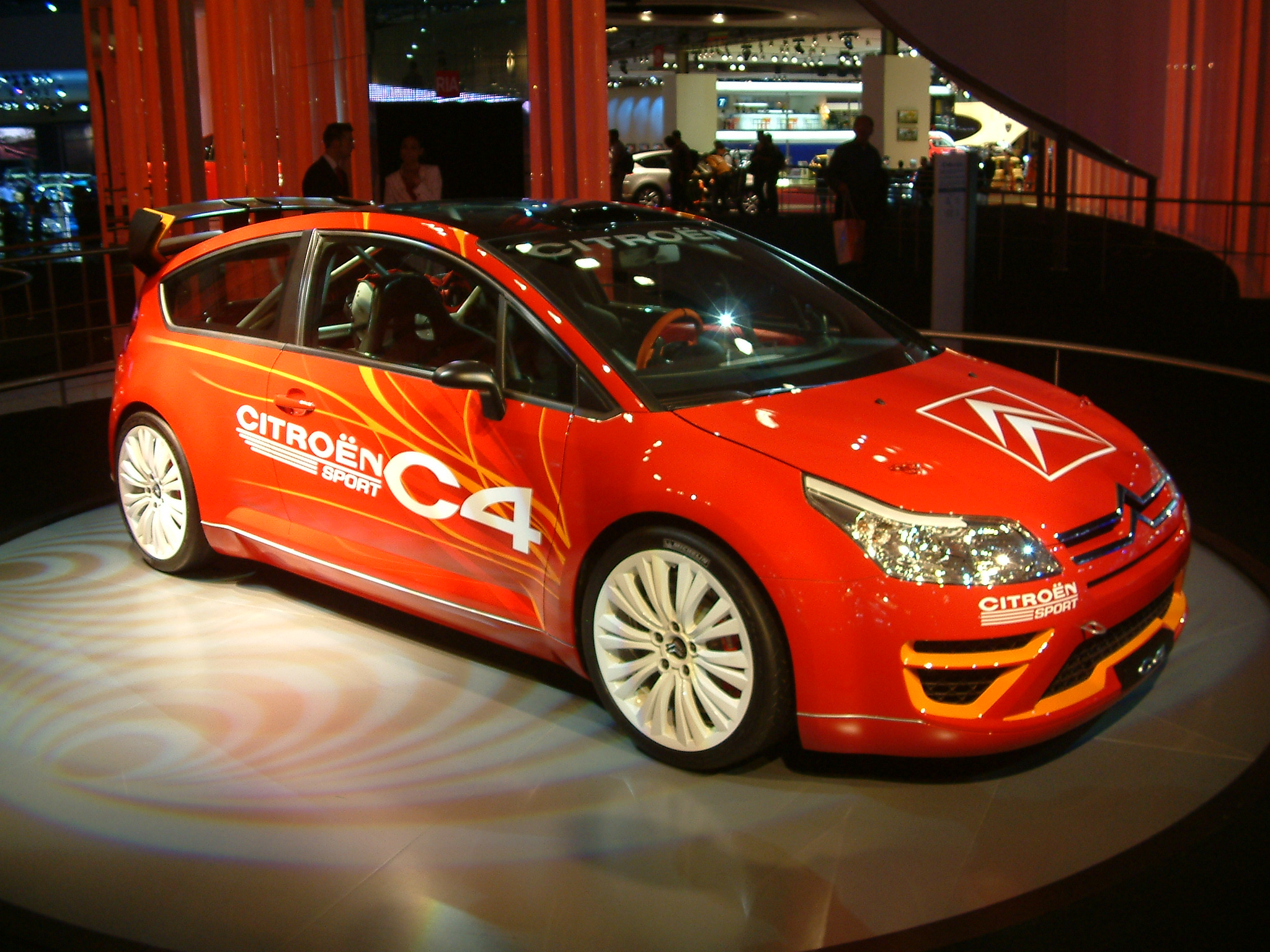
Citroën C4 WRC at the 2006 Paris Motor Show.

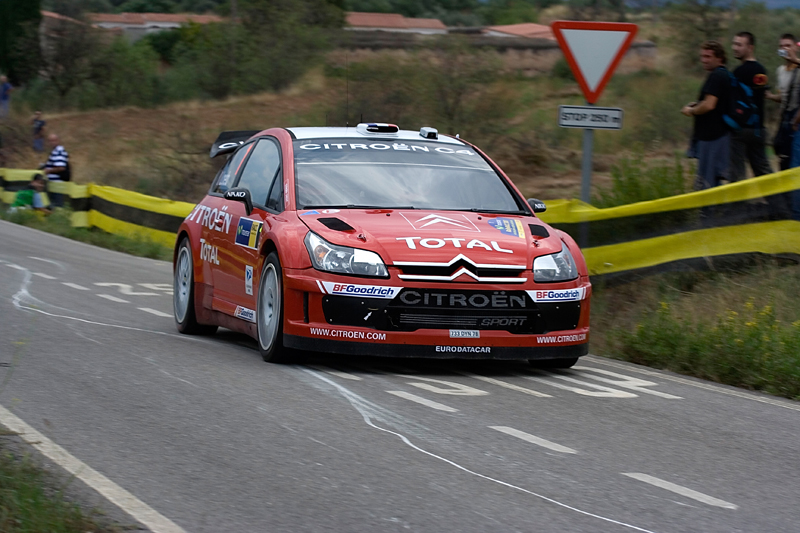
Sébastien Loeb at 2007 Rally Catalunya.

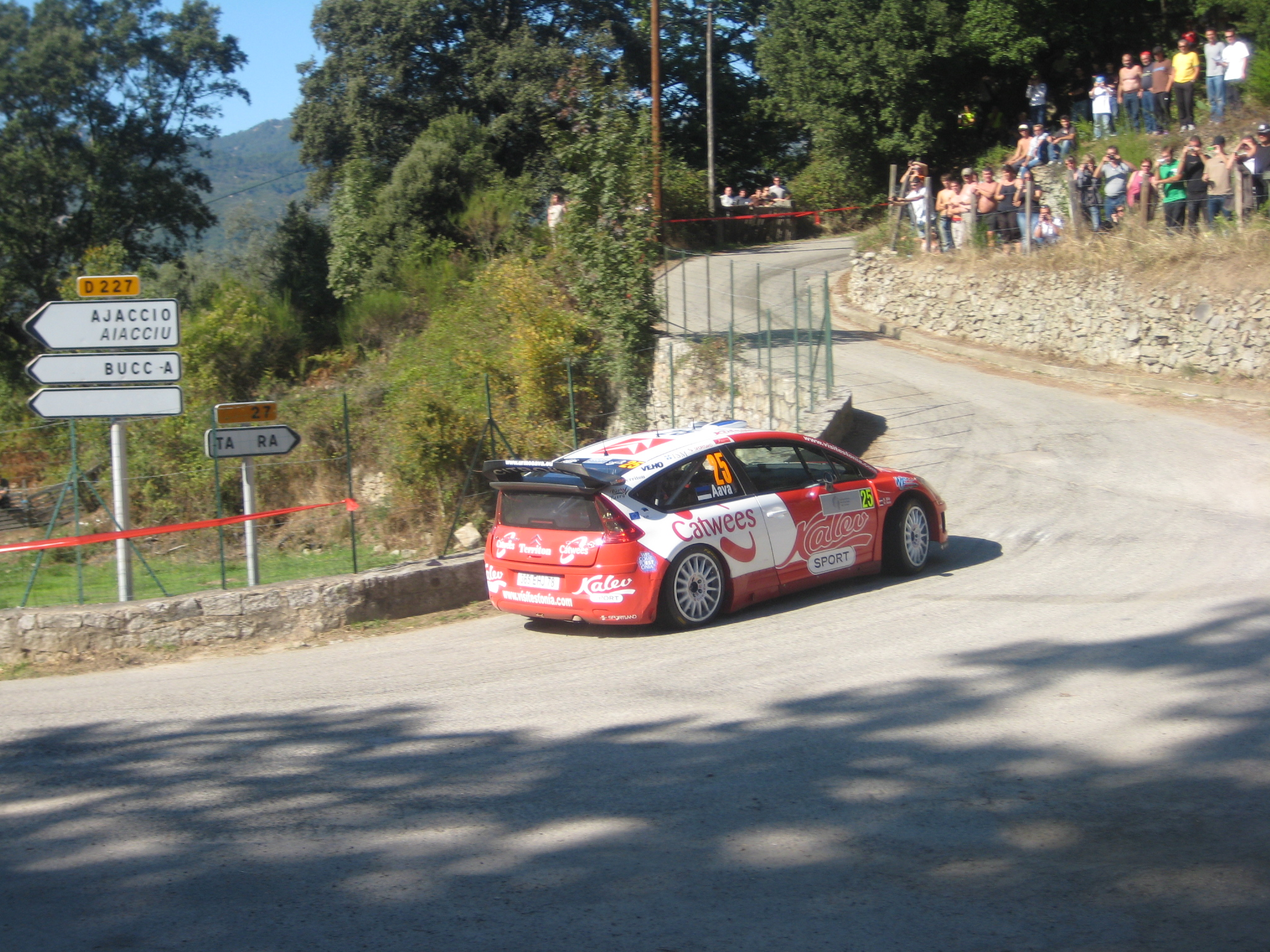
Urmo Aava at 2008 Rallye de France.

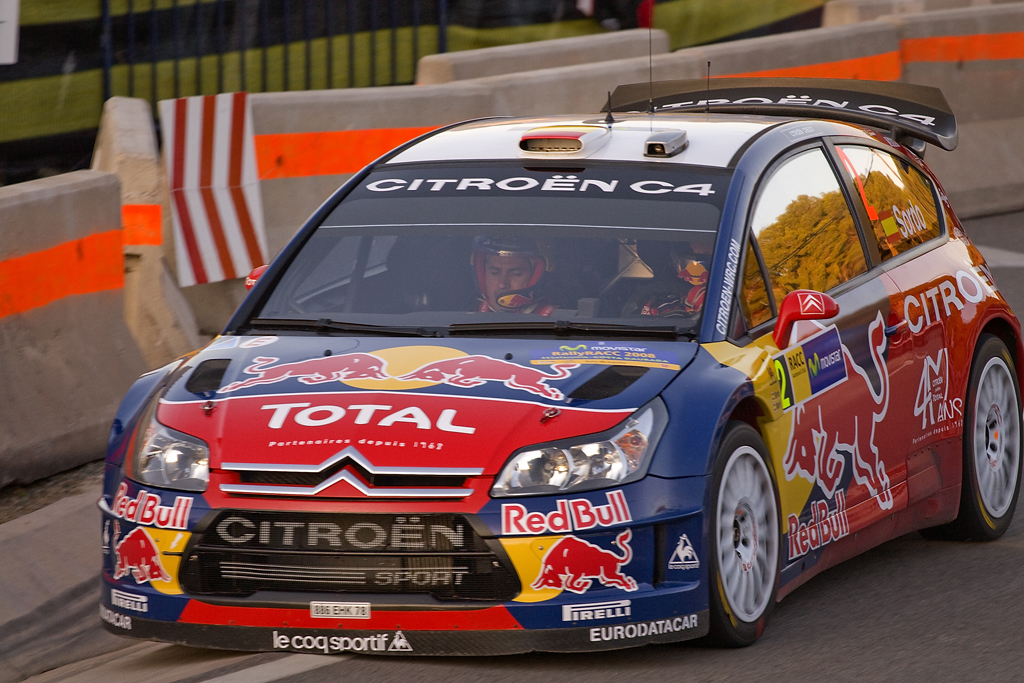
Sordo at 2008 Rally Catalunya.

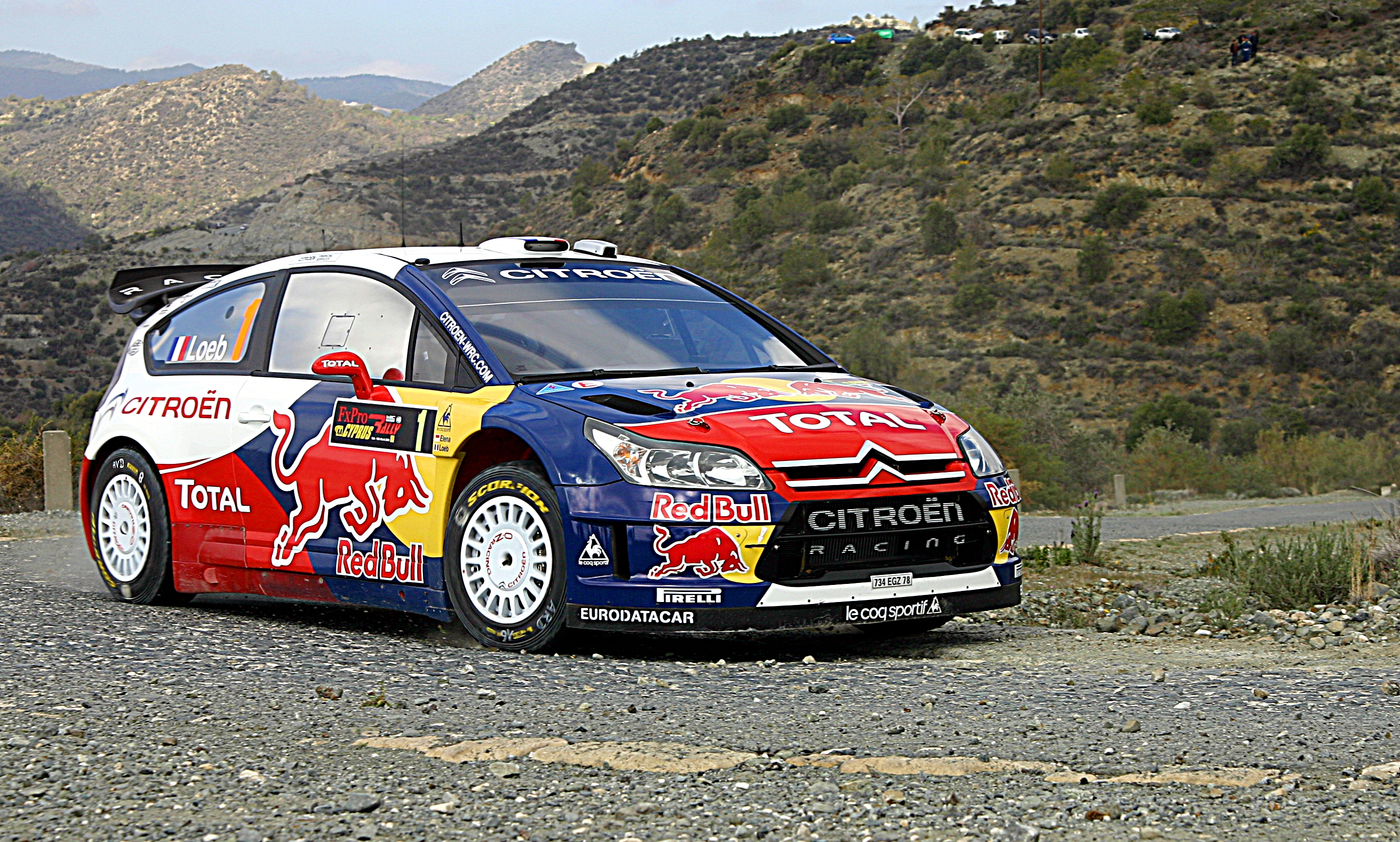
Loeb at 2009 Rally Cyprus.

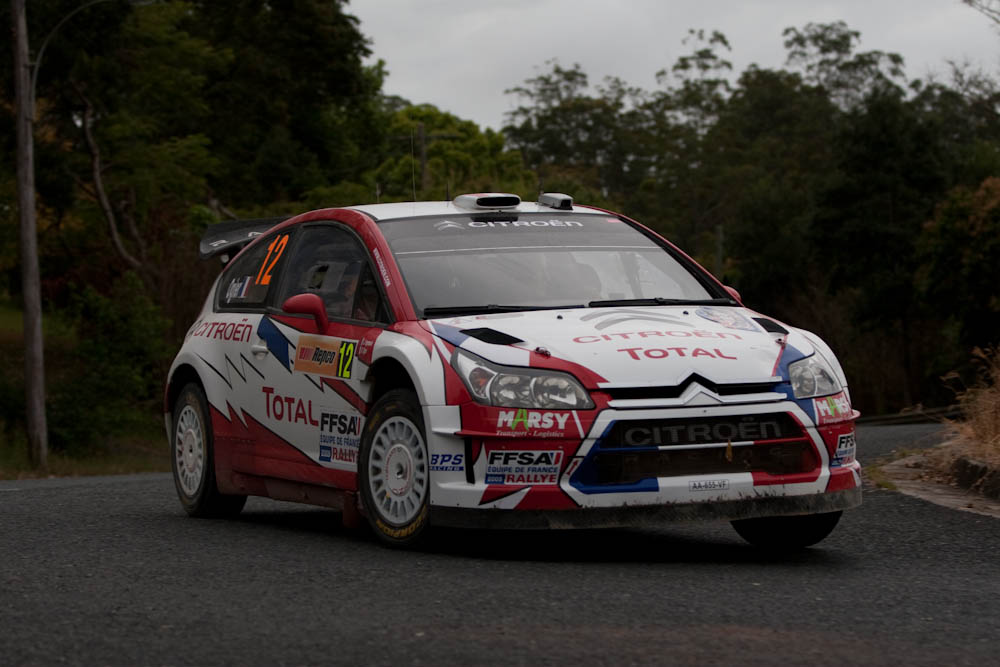
Sébastien Ogier at 2009 Rally Australia.

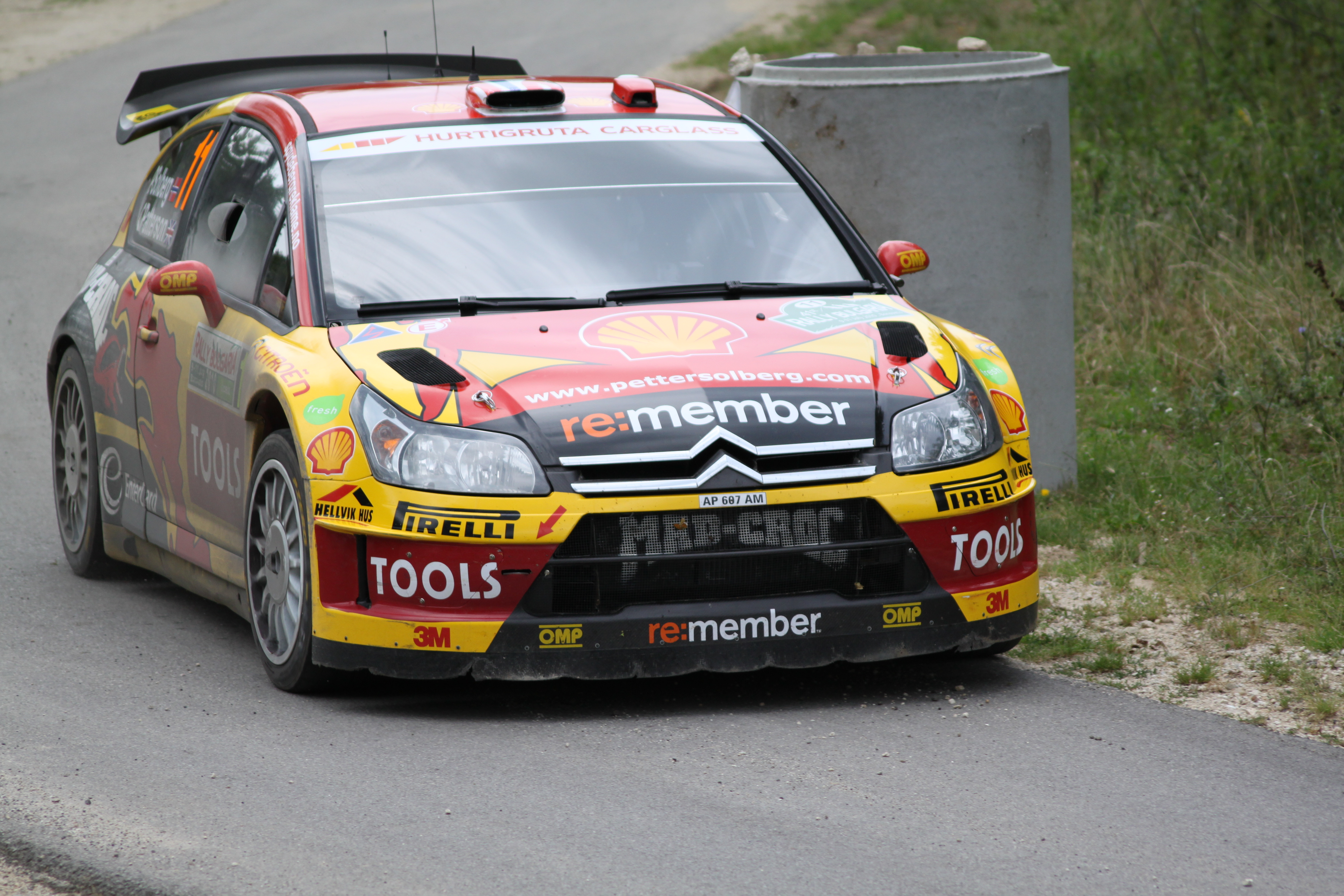
Petter Solberg at 2010 Rally Bulgaria.

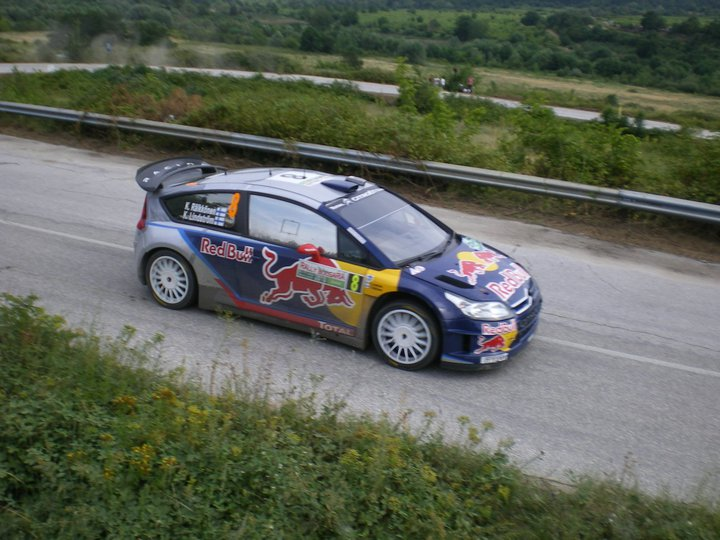
Kimi Räikkönen at 2010 Rally Bulgaria.

Awards
Preceded by Ford Focus WRC	Autosport Awards; Rally Car of the Year; 2008–2010	Succeeded by Mini John Cooper Works WRC
