= 2008 Rally México =

Rallying motorsport event

2008 Rally México 22º Corona Rally México
Round 3 of the 2008 World Rally Championship
← Previous event	Next event →
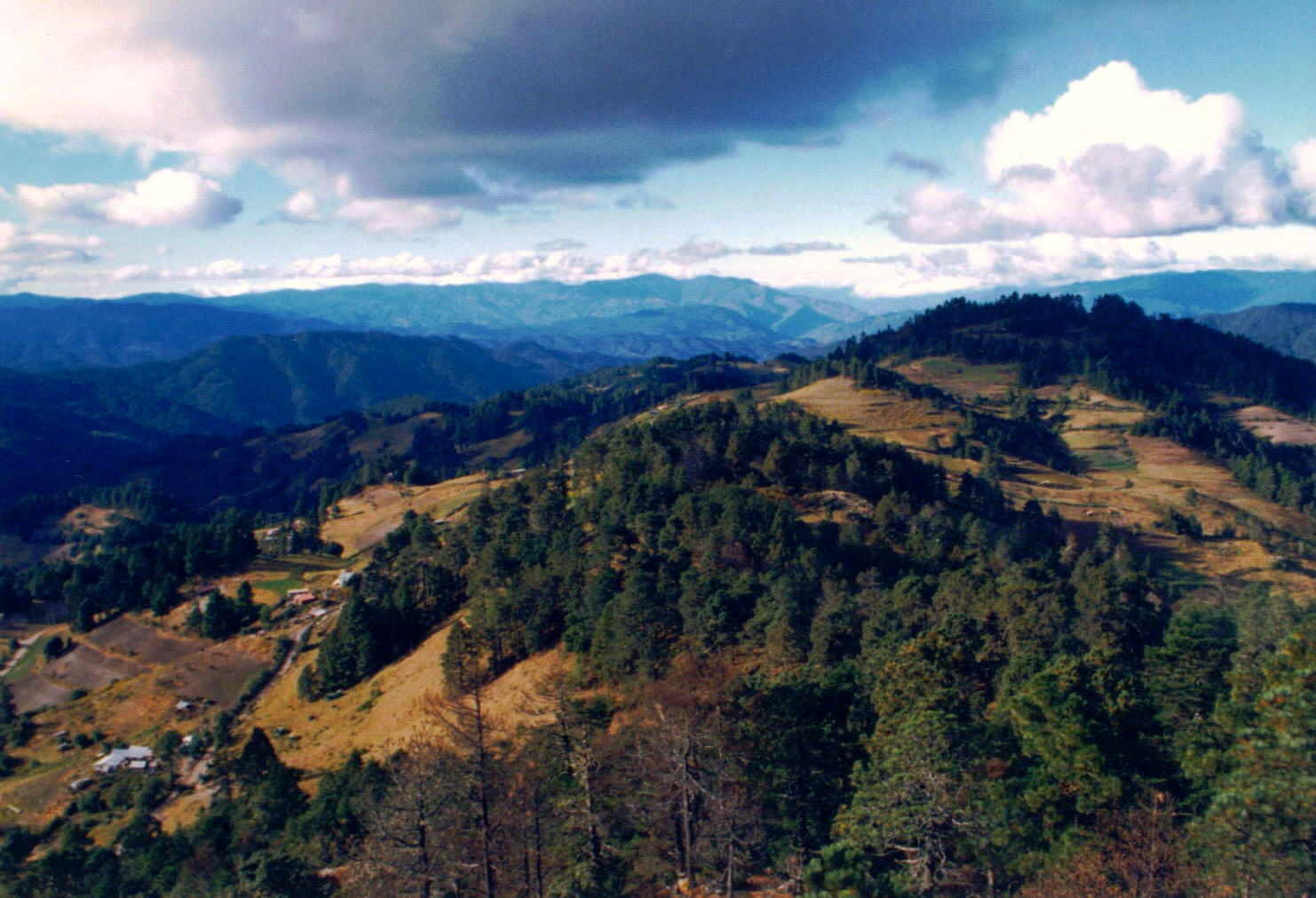
- Sierra Madre mountains in Mexico
- Host country: Mexico
- Rally base: León, Mexico
- Dates run: February 29 – March 2, 2008
- Stages: 20 (353.75 km; 219.81 miles)
- Stage surface: Gravel
- Overall distance: 830.83 km (516.25 miles)

Statistics
- Crews: 39 at start, 29 at finish

Overall results
- Overall winner: (France) Sébastien Loeb (France) Citroën-Total World Rally Team

The 2008 Rally México, officially 22º Corona Rally México, was the third round of the 2008 World Rally Championship season. The rally was held on February 29 — March 2 and began with a ceremonial start on Thursday, February 28. It was the first gravel event of the season and also the opening round of the Junior World Rally Championship this season.

== The event ==
The rally consisted of 20 special stages, one of which was cancelled due to safety reasons, as there were too many spectators gathered around the road. Also five of the stages were Super Special Stages. Some of the sections were placed as high as 2700 meters over sea level, causing significant engine power loss due to lower air pressure.

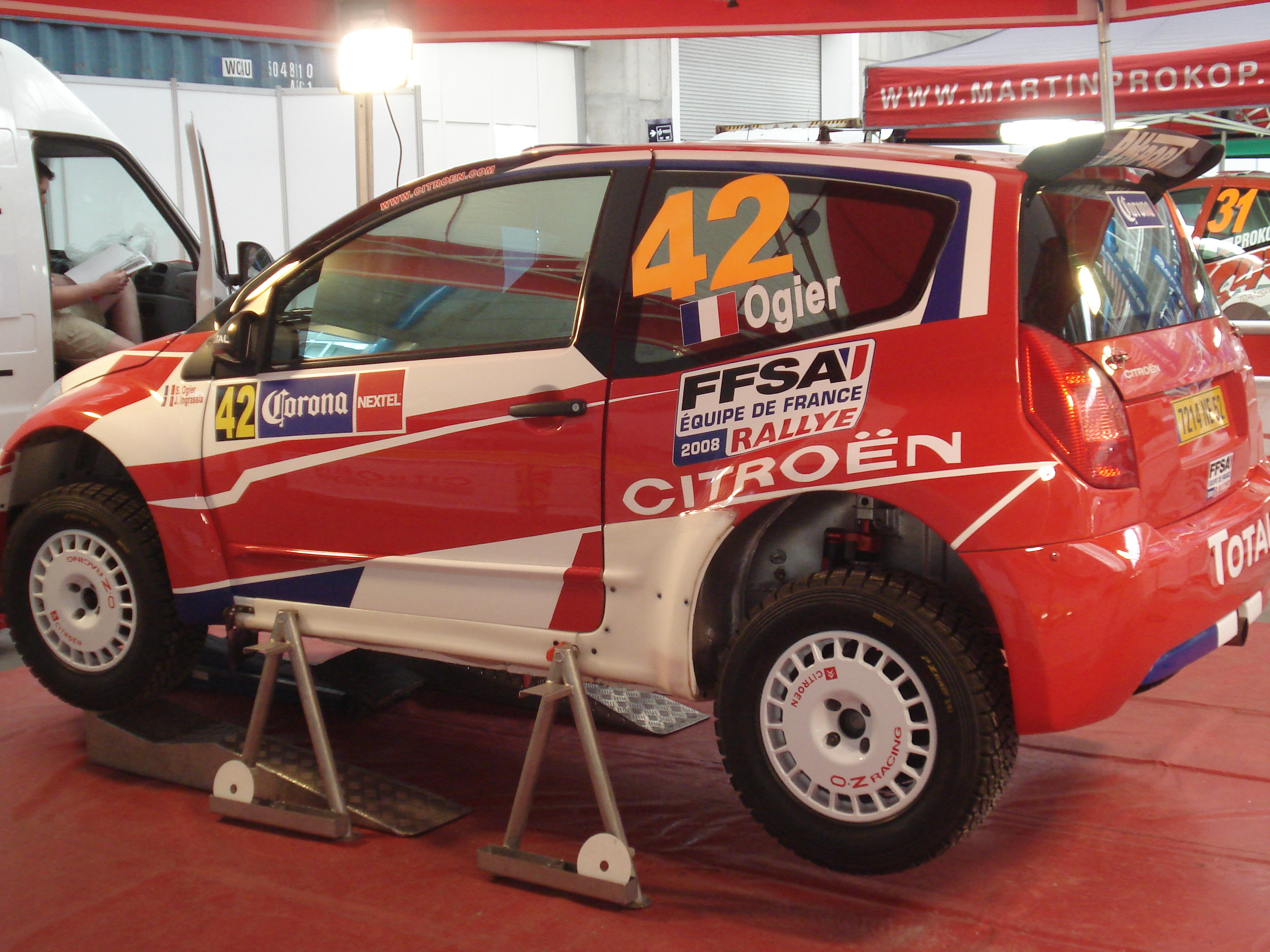
Sebastien Ogier's Citroën C2 S1600 parked in the service area.

The event was won by the previous edition's winner, Sébastien Loeb. Before the rally there was some controversy with Citroën Team changing the engine in his car after a major malfunction during the shakedown, but the team reverted to the original unit and avoided a five minutes penalty. The first rally leader was Jari-Matti Latvala, but after having to be the opening driver on the second day's stages and suffering from the broken intercooler pipe, causing the turbo to overheat and break, he dropped to third. Subaru's Chris Atkinson finished second after constant pace placing him in the top eight on every stage, achieving the best result in his career so far. Fourth overall was Mikko Hirvonen who lost large amounts of time after a few punctures and having to change a wheel in his Ford Focus RS WRC 07. Henning Solberg lost his battle for fourth with Hirvonen and had to settle for fifth after damaging his damper. The rest of pointing drivers were Matthew Wilson, Federico Villagra, both in Focuses 2007 spec and privateer Ricardo Triviño driving a Peugeot 206 WRC. Petter Solberg managed to score the last point in Manufacturers' Championship, even though having to restart under SupeRally format after having mechanical problems with the front left driveshaft in his Subaru Impreza WRC2007 on SS10. Citroën's number two, Daniel Sordo, came back into the fight after breaking the suspension in his C4 WRC and retiring too, but even though he won 3 stages overall, he wasn't able to regain the penalty he was given.

Suzuki drivers suffered from mechanical problems during the first day and both Toni Gardemeister and Per-Gunnar Andersson had to retire from the rally for good. Also Stobart's Gigi Galli wasn't able to finish the event - the Italian had to retire from top-eight position after breaking the suspension in his Ford Focus.

The top eight was followed by the JWRC podium - Frenchman Sebastien Ogier in Citroën C2 S1600, Estonian Jaan Mölder and Pole Michał Kościuszko, both in Suzuki Swifts S1600.

=== Result change ===
Mexican Ricardo Triviño was disqualified during the second day of the event for using non-homologated driving gloves; he was able to complete the rally after deciding to appeal his case to higher jurisdiction. His request was later rejected and Triviño was excluded from the event, which resulted in Sebastien Ogier, WRC debutant, to score one point in drivers' championship. It was the first time in World Rally history that JWRC driver driving Super 1600 front-wheel drive rally car scored points in overall classification.

== Results ==
Pos.	Driver	Co-driver	Car	Time	Difference	Points
WRC
1.	(France) Sébastien Loeb	(Monaco) Daniel Elena	Citroën C4 WRC	3:33:29.9		10
2.	(Australia) Chris Atkinson	(Belgium) Stéphane Prévot	Subaru Impreza WRC2007	3:34:36.0	1:06.1	8
3.	(Finland) Jari-Matti Latvala	(Finland) Miikka Anttila	Ford Focus RS WRC 07	3:35:09.6	1:39.7	6
4.	(Finland) Mikko Hirvonen	(Finland) Jarmo Lehtinen	Ford Focus RS WRC 07	3:37:08.6	3:38.7	5
5.	(Norway) Henning Solberg	(Norway) Cato Menkerud	Ford Focus RS WRC 07	3:38:27.8	4:57.9	4
6.	(United Kingdom) Matthew Wilson	(Republic of Ireland) Michael Orr	Ford Focus RS WRC 07	3:39:58.8	6:28.9	3
7.	(Argentina) Federico Villagra	(Argentina) Jorge Perez Companc	Ford Focus RS WRC 07	3:52:32.9	19:03.0	2
DSQ ^{a}	~~(Mexico) Ricardo Triviño~~	~~(Spain) Sergio Salom~~	~~Peugeot 206 WRC~~	~~3:54:47.2~~	~~21:17.3~~	~~1~~
8.	(France) Sebastien Ogier	(France) Julien Ingrassia	Citroën C2 S1600	3:58:54.8	25:24.9	1
Ricardo Triviño was disqualified for wearing non-homologated driving gloves.
JWRC
1. (8.)	(France) Sebastien Ogier	(France) Julien Ingrassia	Citroën C2 S1600	3:58:54.8		10
2. (9.)	(Estonia) Jaan Mölder	(Belgium) Frederic Miclotte	Suzuki Swift S1600	4:00:26.7	1:31.9	8
3. (10.)	(Poland) Michał Kościuszko	(Poland) Maciej Szczepaniak	Suzuki Swift S1600	4:02:00.0	3:05.2	6
4. (12.)	(Germany) Aaron Burkart	(Germany) Michael Kölbach	Citroën C2 S1600	4:04:56.6	6:01.8	5
5. (13.)	(Sweden) Patrik Sandell	(Sweden) Emil Axelsson	Renault Clio S1600	4:06:40.5	7:45.7	4
6. (19.)	(Republic of Ireland) Shaun Gallagher	(United Kingdom) Clive Jenkins	Citroën C2 S1600	4:14:16.0	15:21.2	3
7. (22.)	(Czech Republic) Martin Prokop	(Czech Republic) Jan Tománek	Citroën C2 S1600	4:48:43.2	49:48.4	2
8. (23.)	(Italy) Francesco Fanari	(Italy) Massimiliano Bosi	Citroën C2 S1600	4:51:28.8	52:34.0	1

== Special stages ==
All dates and times are CST (UTC-6).

Day	Stage	Time^{[A]}	Name	Length	Winner	Time	Avg. spd.	Rally leader
1 (29 FEB)	SS1	08:28	Alfaro 1	22.96 km	(Finland) J. Latvala	14:14.6	96.7 km/h	(Finland) J. Latvala
1 (29 FEB)	SS2	09:51	Ortega 1	23.83 km	(France) S. Loeb	14:11.8	100.7 km/h	(Finland) J. Latvala
1 (29 FEB)	SS3	10:39	El Cubilete 1	18.87 km	(France) S. Loeb	11:51.5	95.5 km/h	(Finland) J. Latvala
1 (29 FEB)	SS4	13:02	Alfaro 2	22.96 km	(Norway) P. Solberg	14:02.5	98.1 km/h	(Finland) J. Latvala
1 (29 FEB)	SS5	14:25	Ortega 2	23.83 km	(Finland) J. Latvala	14:00.1	102.1 km/h	(Finland) J. Latvala
1 (29 FEB)	SS6	15:13	El Cubilete 2	18.87 km	(Finland) J. Latvala	11:45.5	96.3 km/h	(Finland) J. Latvala
1 (29 FEB)	SS7	16:33	Super Special 1	2.21 km	(Norway) P. Solberg	1:41.7	78.2 km/h	(Finland) J. Latvala
1 (29 FEB)	SS8	16:38	Super Special 2	2.21 km	(France) S. Loeb	1:42.0	78.0 km/h	(Finland) J. Latvala
2 (1 MAR)	SS9	08:24	Ibarilla 1	29.90 km	(France) S. Loeb	18:35.7	96.5 km/h	(Finland) J. Latvala
2 (1 MAR)	SS10	09:47	Duarte 1	23.27 km	(France) S. Loeb	18:19.6	76.2 km/h	(France) S. Loeb
2 (1 MAR)	SS11	10:38	Derramadero 1	23.28 km	(Spain) D. Sordo	14:04.6	99.2 km/h	(France) S. Loeb
2 (1 MAR)	SS12	13:12	Ibarilla 2	29.90 km	(France) S. Loeb	18:21.0	97.8 km/h	(France) S. Loeb
2 (1 MAR)	SS13	14:35	Duarte 2	23.27 km	(Spain) D. Sordo	17:56.2	77.8 km/h	(France) S. Loeb
2 (1 MAR)	SS14	15:26	Derramadero 2	23.28 km	(Norway) H. Solberg	13:52.9	100.6 km/h	(France) S. Loeb
2 (1 MAR)	SS15	16:41	Super Special 3	2.21 km	(France) S. Loeb (Norway) H. Solberg	1:41.9	78.1 km/h	(France) S. Loeb
2 (1 MAR)	SS16	16:46	Super Special 4	2.21 km	(Australia) C. Atkinson (France) S. Loeb	1:40.8	78.9 km/h	(France) S. Loeb
3 (2 MAR)	SS17	08:28	Leon	16.09 km	(Finland) J. Latvala	10:43.3	90.0 km/h	(France) S. Loeb
3 (2 MAR)	SS18	08:56	Guanajuatito	22.30 km	Cancelled			(France) S. Loeb
3 (2 MAR)	SS19	10:19	Comanjilla	17.88 km	(Finland) M. Hirvonen	10:12.7	105.1 km/h	(France) S. Loeb
3 (2 MAR)	SS20	11:34	Super Special 5	4.42 km	(Spain) D. Sordo	3:19.3	79.8 km/h	(France) S. Loeb

Footnotes

- A all times local

== Championship standings after the event ==
=== Drivers' championship ===
Pos	Driver	MON (Monaco)	SWE (Sweden)	MEX (Mexico)	ARG (Argentina)	JOR (Jordan)	ITA (Italy)	GRC (Greece)	TUR (Turkey)	FIN (Finland)	GER (Germany)	NZL (New Zealand)	ESP (Spain)	FRA (France)	JPN (Japan)	GBR (United Kingdom)	Pts
1	(Finland) Mikko Hirvonen	2	2	4													21
2	(France) Sébastien Loeb	1	Ret.	1													20
3	(Finland) Jari-Matti Latvala	12	1	3													16
4	(Australia) Chris Atkinson	3	21	2													14
5	(Italy) Gigi Galli	6	3	Ret.													9
5	(Norway) Petter Solberg	5	4	12													9
7	(Belgium) François Duval	4															5
8	(Norway) Henning Solberg	9	13	5													4
8	(Norway) Andreas Mikkelsen		5														4
10	(Spain) Dani Sordo	11	6	17													3
10	(United Kingdom) Matthew Wilson	10	Ret.	6													3
12	(France) Jean-Marie Cuoq	7															2
12	(Finland) Toni Gardemeister	Ret.	7	Ret.													2
12	(Argentina) Federico Villagra			7													2
15	(Sweden) Per-Gunnar Andersson	8	Ret.	Ret.													1
15	(Finland) Juho Hänninen		8														1
15	(France) Sebastien Ogier			8													1
Pos	Driver	MON (Monaco)	SWE (Sweden)	MEX (Mexico)	ARG (Argentina)	JOR (Jordan)	ITA (Italy)	GRC (Greece)	TUR (Turkey)	FIN (Finland)	GER (Germany)	NZL (New Zealand)	ESP (Spain)	FRA (France)	JPN (Japan)	GBR (United Kingdom)	Pts

Key
Colour	Result
Gold	Winner
Silver	2nd place
Bronze	3rd place
Green	Points finish
Blue	Non-points finish
Blue	Non-classified finish (NC)
Purple	Did not finish (Ret)
Black	Excluded (EX)
Black	Disqualified (DSQ)
White	Did not start (DNS)
White	Cancelled (C)
Blank	Withdrew entry from the event (WD)

=== Manufacturers' championship ===
Rank	Driver	Event															Total points
Rank	Driver	MON (Monaco)	SWE (Sweden)	MEX (Mexico)	ARG (Argentina)	JOR (Jordan)	ITA (Italy)	GRC (Greece)	TUR (Turkey)	FIN (Finland)	GER (Germany)	NZL (New Zealand)	ESP (Spain)	FRA (France)	JPN (Japan)	GBR (United Kingdom)	Total points
1	(United Kingdom) BP Ford World Rally Team	8	18	11	-	-	-	-	-	-	-	-	-	-	-	-	37
2	(Japan) Subaru World Rally Team	10	6	9	-	-	-	-	-	-	-	-	-	-	-	-	25
2	(France) Citroën Total World Rally Team	11	4	10	-	-	-	-	-	-	-	-	-	-	-	-	25
4	(United Kingdom) Stobart M-Sport Ford Rally Team	8	8	3	-	-	-	-	-	-	-	-	-	-	-	-	19
5	(Argentina) Munchi's Ford World Rally Team			6	-	-	-	-	-	-	-	-	-	-	-	-	6
6	(Japan) Suzuki World Rally Team	2	3	0	-	-	-	-	-	-	-	-	-	-	-	-	5

=== Junior championship ===
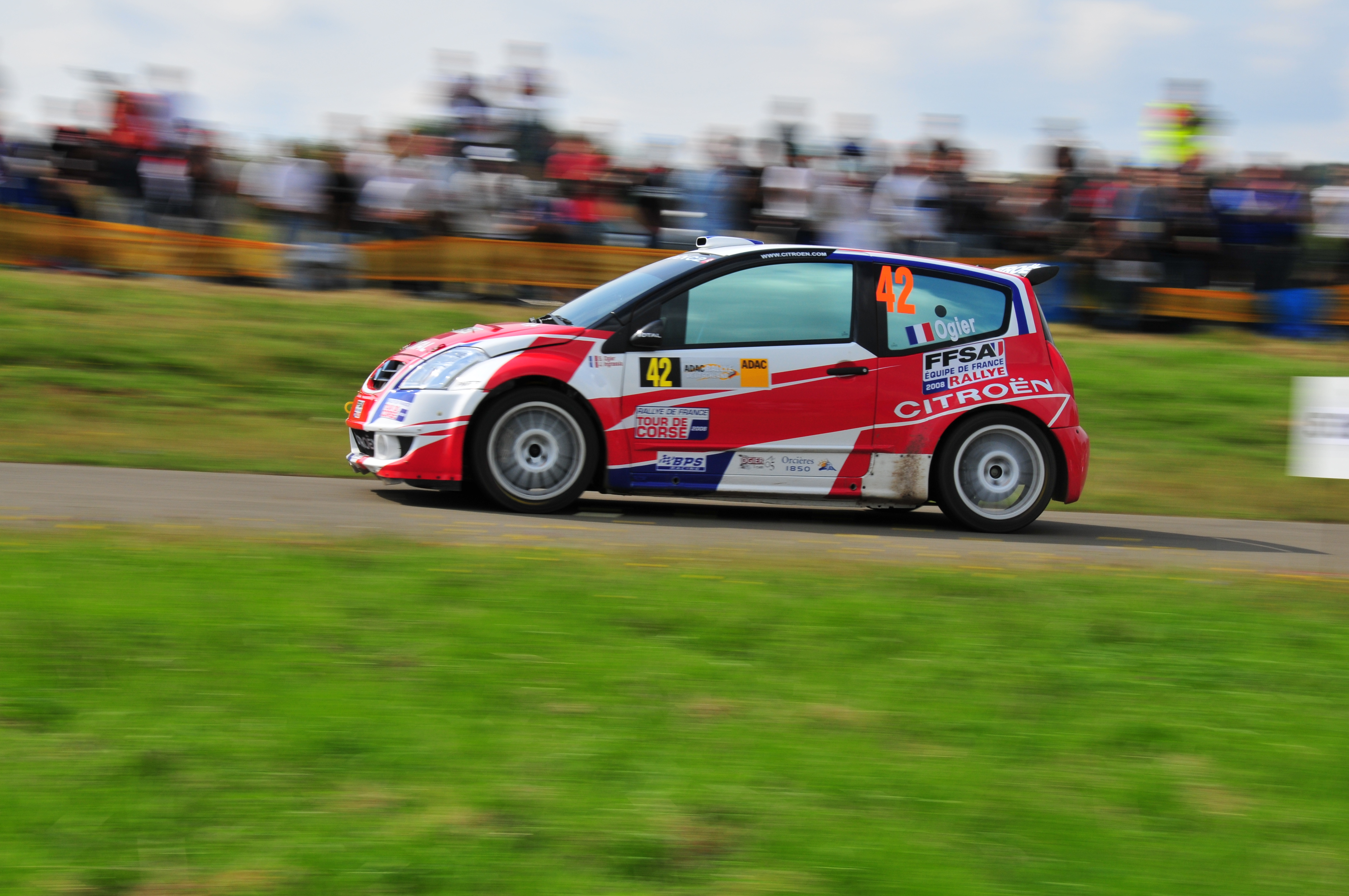
Junior world champion Sébastien Ogier competing in a Citroën C2 S1600 at the 2008 Rallye Deutschland.

Pos	Driver	MEX (Mexico)	JOR (Jordan)	ITA (Italy)	FIN (Finland)	GER (Germany)	ESP (Spain)	FRA (France)	Pts
1	(France) Sébastien Ogier	1							10
2	(Estonia) Jaan Mölder	2							8
3	(Poland) Michał Kościuszko	3							6
4	(Germany) Aaron Burkart	4							5
5	(Sweden) Patrik Sandell	5							4
6	(Republic of Ireland) Shaun Gallagher	6							3
7	(Czech Republic) Martin Prokop	7							2
8	(Italy) Francesco Fanari	8							1
Pos	Driver	MEX (Mexico)	JOR (Jordan)	ITA (Italy)	FIN (Finland)	GER (Germany)	ESP (Spain)	FRA (France)	Pts
