= 2011 Rallye Deutschland =

2011 Rallye Deutschland: 29. ADAC Rallye Deutschland
Round 9 of the 2011 World Rally Championship season
← Previous event	Next event →
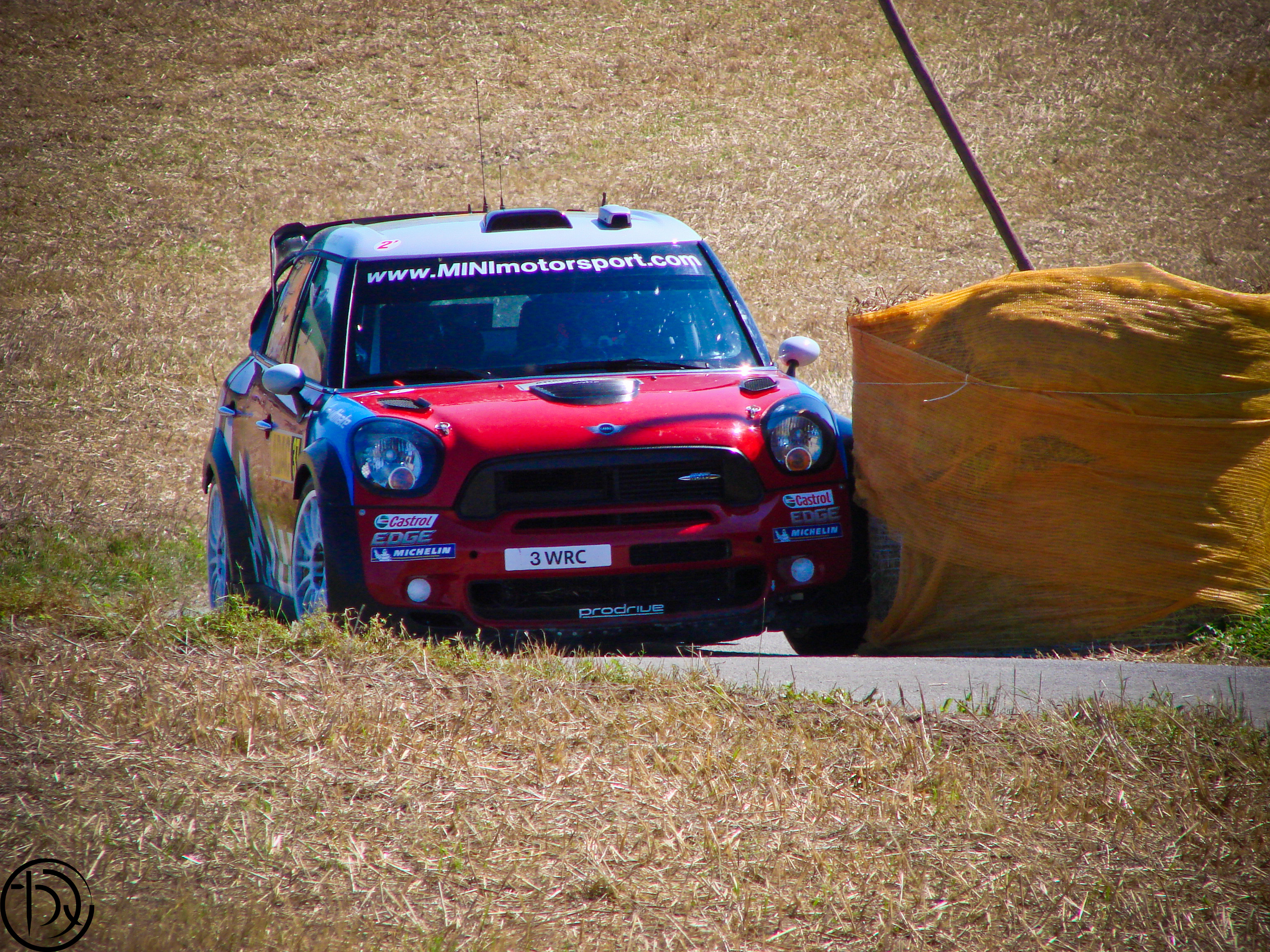
- Host country: Germany
- Rally base: Trier, Germany
- Dates run: 19 August – 21 August 2011
- Stages: 19 (359.59 km; 223.44 miles)
- Stage surface: Tarmac
- Overall distance: 1,245.96 km (774.20 miles)

Statistics
- Crews: 85 at start, 48 at finish

Overall results
- Overall winner: (France) Sébastien Ogier (France) Citroën World Rally Team

The 2011 Rallye Deutschland was the ninth round of the 2011 World Rally Championship season. The rally took place over 19–21 August, and was based in Trier, in the Rhineland-Palatinate state of Germany. The rally was also the sixth round of the Super 2000 World Rally Championship, and the fourth round of the WRC Academy.

Sébastien Ogier won his first tarmac rally, and became the first driver other than his team-mate Sébastien Loeb to win the rally since it became a world championship event in 2002. Ogier benefitted from a puncture suffered by Loeb on the last stage of Saturday's running, and eventually won by just under 40 seconds from Loeb. This also resulted in some controversial remarks by Sébastien Ogier claiming there is "justice in the sport" referencing his prior displeasure with his team's decision to have Ogier hold off while teammate Sébastien Loeb held the lead. Meanwhile, Dani Sordo finished third, taking the first podium for the Mini WRC Team since its return to the sport.

In the SWRC, Ott Tänak took a comfortable victory by over five minutes, while in the WRC Academy, Egon Kaur's perfect start to the season was ended, after he finished in eighth place. Craig Breen, who finished second to Kaur in the previous round in Finland, took his first victory in the class.

== Results ==
=== Event standings ===
Pos.	Driver	Co-driver	Car	Time	Difference	Points
Overall
1.	(France) Sébastien Ogier	(France) Julien Ingrassia	Citroën DS3 WRC	3:32:15.9	0.0	27
2.	(France) Sébastien Loeb	(Monaco) Daniel Elena	Citroën DS3 WRC	3:32:55.7	39.8	21
3.	(Spain) Dani Sordo	(Spain) Carlos Del Barrio	Mini John Cooper Works WRC	3:34:11.5	1:55.6	15
4.	(Finland) Mikko Hirvonen	(Finland) Jarmo Lehtinen	Ford Fiesta RS WRC	3:34:59.6	2:43.7	12
5.	(Norway) Petter Solberg	(United Kingdom) Chris Patterson	Citroën DS3 WRC	3:36:03.9	3:48.0	11
6.	(Finland) Kimi Räikkönen	(Finland) Kaj Lindström	Citroën DS3 WRC	3:39:40.5	7:24.6	8
7.	(Norway) Henning Solberg	(Austria) Ilka Minor	Ford Fiesta RS WRC	3:40:01.8	7:45.9	6
8.	(Portugal) Armindo Araújo	(Portugal) Miguel Ramalho	Mini John Cooper Works WRC	3:41:45.7	9:29.8	4
9.	(Netherlands) Peter van Merksteijn Jr.	(Belgium) Erwin Mombaerts	Citroën DS3 WRC	3:42:17.5	10:01.6	2
10.	(Netherlands) Dennis Kuipers	(Belgium) Frédéric Miclotte	Ford Fiesta RS WRC	3:42:24.9	10:09.0	1
SWRC
1. (12.)	(Estonia) Ott Tänak	(Estonia) Kuldar Sikk	Ford Fiesta S2000	3:46:04.8	0.0	25
2. (16.)	(Qatar) Nasser Al-Attiyah	(Italy) Giovanni Bernacchini	Ford Fiesta S2000	3:51:43.4	5:38.6	18
3. (19.)	(Hungary) Frigyes Turán	(Hungary) Gábor Zsiros	Ford Fiesta S2000	3:54:08.1	8:03.3	15
4. (20.)	(Finland) Juho Hänninen	(Finland) Mikko Markkula	Škoda Fabia S2000	3:57:41.9	11:37.1	12
5. (22.)	(Estonia) Karl Kruuda	(Estonia) Martin Järveoja	Škoda Fabia S2000	4:00:56.6	14:51.8	10
6. (30.)	(Czech Republic) Martin Prokop	(Czech Republic) Jan Tománek	Ford Fiesta S2000	4:12:50.9	26:46.1	8
7. (32.)	(Germany) Hermann Gassner	(Germany) Kathi Wüstenhagen	Škoda Fabia S2000	4:19:04.2	32:59.4	6
8. (35.)	(Portugal) Bernardo Sousa	(Portugal) António Costa	Ford Fiesta S2000	4:20:56.7	34:51.9	4
9. (39.)	(Germany) Felix Herbold	(Germany) Michael Kölbach	Ford Fiesta S2000	4:27:00.5	40:55.7	2
WRC Academy^{†}
1.	(Republic of Ireland) Craig Breen	(United Kingdom) Gareth Roberts	Ford Fiesta R2	3:07:54.0	0.0	30
2.	(Spain) Yeray Lemes	(Spain) Rogelio Peñate	Ford Fiesta R2	3:08:09.1	15.1	25
3.	(Italy) Andrea Crugnola	(Italy) Roberto Mometti	Ford Fiesta R2	3:09:37.2	1:42.3	15
4.	(Spain) José Antonio Suárez	(Spain) Cándido Carrera	Ford Fiesta R2	3:09:52.2	1:58.2	12
5.	(Czech Republic) Jan Černý	(Czech Republic) Pavel Kohout	Ford Fiesta R2	3:10:20.0	2:26.0	11
6.	(Sweden) Fredrik Åhlin	(Sweden) Bjorn Nilsson	Ford Fiesta R2	3:11:02.5	3:08.5	8
7.	(Germany) Sepp Wiegand	(Germany) Claudia Harloff	Ford Fiesta R2	3:11:49.8	3:55.8	0
8.	(Estonia) Egon Kaur	(Estonia) Erik Lepikson	Ford Fiesta R2	3:12:21.7	4:27.7	4
9.	(United Kingdom) Alastair Fisher	(United Kingdom) Daniel Barritt	Ford Fiesta R2	3:14:04.3	6:10.3	2
10.	(Netherlands) Timo van der Marel	(Netherlands) Erwin Berkhof	Ford Fiesta R2	3:14:27.8	6:33.8	1

† – The WRC Academy featured the first two days of the rally.

=== Special stages ===
Day	Stage	Time	Name	Length	Winner	Time	Avg. spd.	Rally leader
Leg 1 (19 August)	SS1	10:13	Ruwertal / Fell 1	24.18 km	(Finland) Jari-Matti Latvala	13:57.4	103.95 km/h	(Finland) Jari-Matti Latvala
Leg 1 (19 August)	SS2	11:26	Grafschaft Veldenz 1	22.47 km	(France) Sébastien Ogier	13:18.9	101.25 km/h	(France) Sébastien Ogier
Leg 1 (19 August)	SS3	12:14	Moselland 1	19.92 km	(France) Sébastien Loeb	12:15.1	97.55 km/h	(France) Sébastien Loeb
Leg 1 (19 August)	SS4	15:07	Ruwertal / Fell 2	24.18 km	(France) Sébastien Ogier	13:50.3	104.84 km/h	(France) Sébastien Loeb
Leg 1 (19 August)	SS5	16:20	Grafschaft Veldenz 2	22.47 km	(France) Sébastien Loeb	12:51.5	104.85 km/h	(France) Sébastien Loeb
Leg 1 (19 August)	SS6	17:08	Moselland 2	19.92 km	(France) Sébastien Loeb	12:01.9	99.34 km/h	(France) Sébastien Loeb
Leg 2 (20 August)	SS7	8:18	Hermeskeil / Gusenburg 1	11.37 km	(Finland) Jari-Matti Latvala	6:12.9	109.77 km/h	(France) Sébastien Loeb
Leg 2 (20 August)	SS8	9:31	Bosenberg 1	14.29 km	(France) Sébastien Ogier	8:25.5	101.77 km/h	(France) Sébastien Loeb
Leg 2 (20 August)	SS9	10:29	Birkenfelder Land 1	15.23 km	(France) Sébastien Loeb	8:35.5	106.36 km/h	(France) Sébastien Loeb
Leg 2 (20 August)	SS10	11:02	Arena Panzerplatte 1	34.18 km	(France) Sébastien Ogier	19:55.3	102.94 km/h	(France) Sébastien Loeb
Leg 2 (20 August)	SS11	15:18	Hermeskeil / Gusenburg 2	11.37 km	(France) Sébastien Ogier	6:09.1	110.90 km/h	(France) Sébastien Loeb
Leg 2 (20 August)	SS12	16:31	Bosenberg 2	14.29 km	(France) Sébastien Loeb	8:23.8	102.11 km/h	(France) Sébastien Loeb
Leg 2 (20 August)	SS13	17:29	Birkenfelder Land 2	15.23 km	(France) Sébastien Loeb	8:36.5	106.15 km/h	(France) Sébastien Loeb
Leg 2 (20 August)	SS14	18:02	Arena Panzerplatte 2	34.18 km	(France) Sébastien Ogier	19:49.2	103.47 km/h	(France) Sébastien Ogier
Leg 3 (21 August)	SS15	8:13	Dhrontal 1	20.85 km	(Finland) Mikko Hirvonen	12:17.2	101.82 km/h	(France) Sébastien Ogier
Leg 3 (21 August)	SS16	8:56	Moselwein 1	15.12 km	(Finland) Jari-Matti Latvala	9:16.5	97.81 km/h	(France) Sébastien Ogier
Leg 3 (21 August)	SS17	11:29	Dhrontal 2	20.85 km	(France) Sébastien Loeb	12:32.1	99.80 km/h	(France) Sébastien Ogier
Leg 3 (21 August)	SS18	12:12	Moselwein 2	15.12 km	(France) Sébastien Loeb	9:31.4	95.26 km/h	(France) Sébastien Ogier
Leg 3 (21 August)	SS19	14:11	SSS Circus Maximus Trier (Power stage)	4.37 km	(France) Sébastien Loeb	3:17.4	79.70 km/h	(France) Sébastien Ogier

=== Power Stage ===
The "Power stage" was a live, televised 4.37 km (2.72 mi) stage at the end of the rally, held in Trier.

Pos	Driver	Time	Diff.	Avg. speed	Points
1	(France) Sébastien Loeb	3:17.4	0.0	79.70 km/h	3
2	(France) Sébastien Ogier	3:19.4	+2.0	78.90 km/h	2
3	(Norway) Petter Solberg	3:20.4	+3.0	78.50 km/h	1
