= 2008 Rally Catalunya =

Motor rally competition

2008 Rally Catalunya 44è Rally RACC Catalunya - Costa Daurada
Round 12 of the 2008 World Rally Championship
← Previous event	Next event →
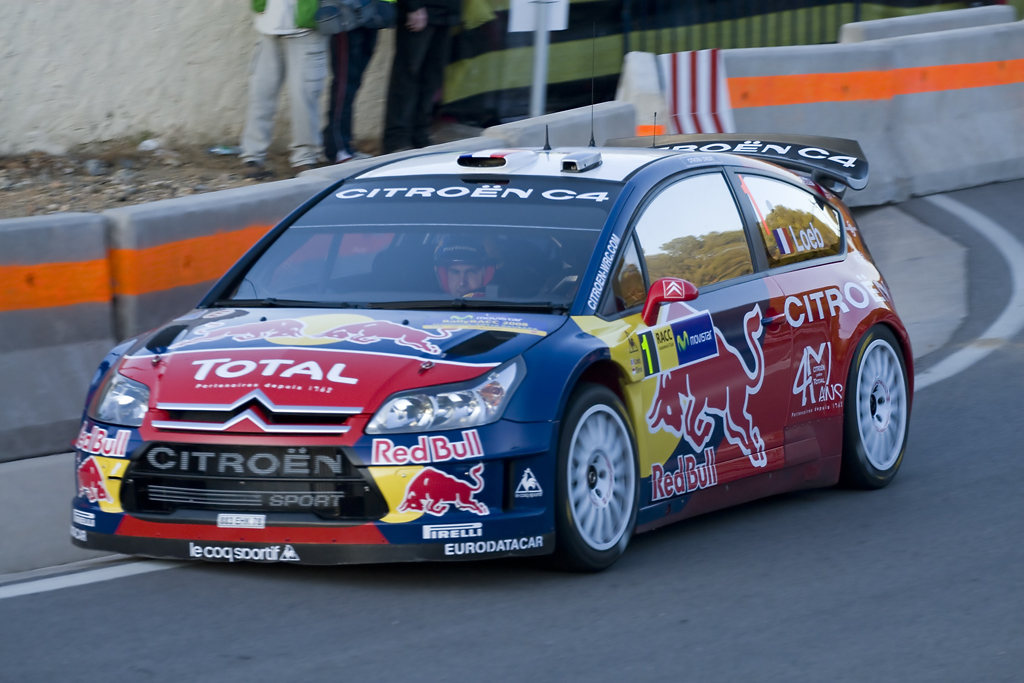
- Rally winner Sébastien Loeb.
- Rally base: Salou
- Dates run: October 2 – 5 2008
- Stages: 18 (352.87 km; 219.26 miles)
- Stage surface: Tarmac
- Overall distance: 1,359.96 km (845.04 miles)

Statistics
- Crews: 69 at start, 48 at finish

Overall results
- Overall winner: (France) Sébastien Loeb (France) Citroën Total World Rally Team; Citroën C4 WRC

The 2008 Rally Catalunya, officially 44è Rally RACC Catalunya - Costa Daurada, was the 44th Rally Catalunya and the 12th round of the 2008 World Rally Championship season. The rally took place during October 2–5, 2008 and consisted of 18 special stages.

The rally was won by Citroën Total World Rally Team's Sébastien Loeb ahead of his teammate Dani Sordo. This was Citroën's third double win in a row, after previous one-two finishes in Germany and New Zealand. BP Ford World Rally Team's Mikko Hirvonen and François Duval took comfortable third and fourth positions, although only battled with each other and never managed to challenge the Citroëns. Duval eased off in one stage to let Hirvonen, who continued his fight for the drivers' title with Loeb, to take the third place and one extra point.

Subaru World Rally Team's Petter Solberg fought for fifth place with Urmo Aava until the penultimate stage, when Aava retired after making a mistake and breaking his Citroën C4 WRC's suspension. The battle for sixth place went down to the wire, with Stobart M-Sport Ford's Jari-Matti Latvala edging out Subaru's Chris Atkinson by 1.1 seconds. Andreas Mikkelsen drove his privateer Ford Focus RS WRC 07 to eighth place, taking the second points finish of his career.

== Results ==
Pos.	Driver	Co-driver	Car	Time	Difference	Points
WRC
1.	(France) Sébastien Loeb	(Monaco) Daniel Elena	Citroën C4 WRC	3:21:17.4	0.0	10
2.	(Spain) Dani Sordo	(Spain) Marc Marti	Citroën C4 WRC	3:21:42.3	24.9	8
3.	(Finland) Mikko Hirvonen	(Finland) Jarmo Lehtinen	Ford Focus RS WRC 07	3:22:19.9	1:02.5	6
4.	(Belgium) François Duval	(France) Patrick Pivato	Ford Focus RS WRC 07	3:22:28.2	1:10.8	5
5.	(Norway) Petter Solberg	(United Kingdom) Phil Mills	Subaru Impreza WRC 2008	3:24:44.8	3:27.4	4
6.	(Finland) Jari-Matti Latvala	(Finland) Miikka Anttila	Ford Focus RS WRC 07	3:25:21.2	4:03.8	3
7.	(Australia) Chris Atkinson	(Belgium) Stéphane Prévot	Subaru Impreza WRC 2008	3:25:22.3	4:04.9	2
8.	(Norway) Andreas Mikkelsen	(Norway) Ola Floene	Ford Focus RS WRC 07	3:26:37.0	5:19.6	1

== Championship standings after the event ==
=== Drivers' championship ===
Pos	Driver	MON (Monaco)	SWE (Sweden)	MEX (Mexico)	ARG (Argentina)	JOR (Jordan)	ITA (Italy)	GRC (Greece)	TUR (Turkey)	FIN (Finland)	GER (Germany)	NZL (New Zealand)	ESP (Spain)	FRA (France)	JPN (Japan)	GBR (United Kingdom)	Pts
1	(France) Sébastien Loeb	1	Ret.	1	1	10	1	1	3	1	1	1	1				96
2	(Finland) Mikko Hirvonen	2	2	4	5	1	2	3	1	2	4	3	3				84
3	(Spain) Dani Sordo	11	6	17	3	2	5	5	4	4	2	2	2				59
4	(Australia) Chris Atkinson	3	21	2	2	3	6	Ret.	13	3	6	Ret.	7				42
5	(Finland) Jari-Matti Latvala	12	1	3	15	7	3	7	2	39	9	Ret.	6				37
6	(Norway) Petter Solberg	5	4	12	Ret.	Ret.	10	2	6	6	5	4	5				36
7	(Norway) Henning Solberg	9	13	5	Ret.	4	7	8	5	5	7	9	11				22
8	(Italy) Gigi Galli	6	3	Ret.	7	8	4	Ret.	Ret.	Ret.	Ret.	Inj.	Inj.				17
9	(Belgium) François Duval	4									3	Ret.	4				16
10	(United Kingdom) Matthew Wilson	10	Ret.	6	Ret.	5	12	6	7	9	12	17	9				12
11	(Estonia) Urmo Aava		18			Ret.	8	4	Ret.	16	8	5	35				11
12	(Argentina) Federico Villagra			7	6	6	14	13	9	Ret.		8	12				9
13	(Zimbabwe) Conrad Rautenbach	Ret.	16	16	4	26	13	10	8	10	10	Ret.	Ret.				6
14	(Norway) Andreas Mikkelsen		5				Ret.		19	12	11		8				5
15	(Finland) Toni Gardemeister	Ret.	7	Ret.	Ret.	Ret.	Ret.	9	Ret.	8	10	7	13				5
16	(Sweden) Per-Gunnar Andersson	8	Ret.	Ret.	24	Ret.	9	11	Ret.	Ret.	15	6	32				4
17	(France) Jean-Marie Cuoq	7															2
17	(Finland) Matti Rantanen									7							2
19	(Finland) Juho Hänninen		8					21		13		14	29				1
19	(France) Sébastien Ogier			8		11	22			36	19		Ret.				1
19	(Austria) Andreas Aigner		31		8			14	11	Ret.		Ret.					1
Pos	Driver	MON (Monaco)	SWE (Sweden)	MEX (Mexico)	ARG (Argentina)	JOR (Jordan)	ITA (Italy)	GRC (Greece)	TUR (Turkey)	FIN (Finland)	GER (Germany)	NZL (New Zealand)	ESP (Spain)	FRA (France)	JPN (Japan)	GBR (United Kingdom)	Pts

Key
Colour	Result
Gold	Winner
Silver	2nd place
Bronze	3rd place
Green	Points finish
Blue	Non-points finish
Blue	Non-classified finish (NC)
Purple	Did not finish (Ret)
Black	Excluded (EX)
Black	Disqualified (DSQ)
White	Did not start (DNS)
White	Cancelled (C)
Blank	Withdrew entry from the event (WD)

=== Manufacturers' championship ===
Rank	Team	Event															Total points
Rank	Team	MON (Monaco)	SWE (Sweden)	MEX (Mexico)	ARG (Argentina)	JOR (Jordan)	ITA (Italy)	GRC (Greece)	TUR (Turkey)	FIN (Finland)	GER (Germany)	NZL (New Zealand)	ESP (Spain)	FRA (France)	JPN (Japan)	GBR (United Kingdom)	Total points
1	(France) Citroën Total World Rally Team	11	4	10	16	9	14	15	11	15	18	18	18	-	-	-	159
2	(United Kingdom) BP Ford World Rally Team	8	18	11	7	13	14	10	18	9	7	6	11	-	-	-	132
3	(Japan) Subaru World Rally Team	10	6	9	8	6	3	8	3	9	7	5	6	-	-	-	80
4	(United Kingdom) Stobart M-Sport Ford Rally Team	8	8	3	3	7	5	3	4	4	6	0	4	-	-	-	55
5	(Argentina) Munchi's Ford World Rally Team	0	0	6	4	4	2	0	3	0	0	3	0	-	-	-	22
6	(Japan) Suzuki World Rally Team	2	3	0	1	0	1	3	0	2	1	7	0	-	-	-	20
