= 2008 Rally New Zealand =

Motor rally competition

2008 Rally New Zealand 38th Repco Rally New Zealand
Round 11 of the 2008 World Rally Championship
← Previous event	Next event →
- Host country: New Zealand
- Rally base: Hamilton
- Dates run: 28 August – 31 2008
- Stages: 18 (353.04 km; 219.37 miles)
- Stage surface: Gravel
- Overall distance: 1,218.20 km (756.95 miles)

Statistics
- Crews: 64 at start, 35 at finish

Overall results
- Overall winner: (France) Sébastien Loeb; Citroën Total World Rally Team

The 2008 Rally New Zealand was the eleventh round of the 2008 World Rally Championship season. The event was based on the northern island of the country near the city of Hamilton. The stages were run on gravel roads characterised by their pronounced camber, which gives them a fast flowing nature. They are also known for their picturesque qualities. The rally ran between 28 and 31 August. Sébastien Loeb won his forty-fourth WRC rally, and his eighth of the season, in a dramatic event, where Mikko Hirvonen came third after being passed in the latter stages of the rally. Daniel Sordo, like Loeb, also driving for Citroën, claimed 2nd place. After the event Loeb had an eight-point lead over Hirvonen in the drivers championship with four events remaining.

== Event ==
Heavy rain in the buildup before the event forced a change to the itinerary, with the 43 km Waitomo stage having to be split into two due to a landslip. Despite the poor weather before the event Matthew Wilson still believed the first car would be at a disadvantage, thus making team tactics - as seen at Turkey - more likely. After Gigi Galli's accident in Germany, François Duval was called up by Stobart Ford to replace him as an approach to two time world champion Marcus Grönholm failed to lure him out of retirement.

=== Day one ===
Despite sweeping the roads for the other competitors, and a big moment when he nearly rolled his car during the very first stage, Loeb was just 0.7 seconds behind Hirvonen going into the penultimate stage of the day. With road positions for day two being decided at the end of this stage, rather than at the short Super special stage at Mystery Creek, Hirvonen was expected to intentionally drop behind Loeb to ensure a better starting position. Loeb then suffered a starter motor problem which meant he couldn't start at his allotted time. With Hirvonen now effectively running first on the road, he was unable to play the tactical game and therefore ended day one in front, and as road sweeper for day two. When questioned after the stage, Loeb denied any suggestion of tactics - citing the thirty-second time penalty he picked up for starting the stage late - "Do you really think I'd give away that much time?" Hirvonen agreed that Loeb seemed to have a genuine problem. Jari-Matti Latvala also tried to improve his starting position but although falling behind Loeb, he managed to stay ahead of Dani Sordo by 0.1 second - despite backing off before the end of the stage. Behind the two factory Ford and Citroën drivers was Duval, who was just under ninety seconds off the lead. Urmo Aava was in sixth, Petter Solberg in seventh with Suzuki driver PG Andersson enjoying a trouble free run in eighth place. Drivers who weren't so lucky included Henning Solberg - who lost seven and a half minutes with power steering problems, Matthew Wilson - who suffered gearbox problems and had to retire for the day after SS4, the same stage as Subaru driver Chris Atkinson - who rolled his car halfway through the stage

=== Day two ===
Loeb used his starting position to close on Hirvonen throughout the day. After taking seven seconds out of his lead on the first stage of the day, Loeb took over the lead on stage twelve. With only one stage left to run on the day Loeb was 4.2 seconds clear - below his target time of a twenty-second lead. With this in mind he slowed down at the end of Te Akau North to let Hirvonen back into the lead. Latvala was able to help Hirvonen by finishing ahead of him on time and to start the final day in front. With Sordo keeping close to the pace of the other leaders, there was only a sixteen-second gap between the first four drivers. Behind the leading pack, the points positions remained the same as on day one. The most noteworthy performance came from Henning Solberg, who used his advantageous road position to claim four stage wins on his climb back up the leaderboard.

== Results ==
Pos.	Driver	Co-driver	Car	Time	Difference	Points
WRC
1.	(France) Sébastien Loeb	(Monaco) Daniel Elena	Citroën C4 WRC	3:59:18.9	0.0	10
2.	(Spain) Dani Sordo	(Spain) Marc Marti	Citroën C4 WRC	3:59;36.4	17.5	8
3.	(Finland) Mikko Hirvonen	(Finland) Jarmo Lehtinen	Ford Focus RS WRC 08	4:00:00.4	41.5	6
4.	(Norway) Petter Solberg	(United Kingdom) Phil Mills	Subaru Impreza WRC 2008	4:02:07.8	2:48.9	5
5.	(Estonia) Urmo Aava	(Estonia) Kuldar Sikk	Citroën C4 WRC	4:02:49.6	3:30.7	4
6.	(Sweden) PG Andersson	(Sweden) Jonas Andersson	Suzuki SX4 WRC	4:06:56.3	7:37.4	3
7.	(Finland) Toni Gardemeister	(Finland) Tomi Tuominen	Suzuki SX4 WRC	4:07:13.8	7:54.9	2
8.	(Argentina) Federico Villagra	(Argentina) Jorge Perez Companc	Ford Focus RS WRC 07	4:07:53.9	8:35.0	1
PCWRC
1. (10.)	(Czech Republic) Martin Prokop	(Czech Republic) Jan Tomanek	Mitsubishi Lancer Evo IX	4:13:07.9	0.0	10
2. (11.)	(Sweden) Patrik Sandell	(Sweden) Emil Axelsson	Mitsubishi Lancer Evo IX	4:13:44.1	36.2	8
3. (12.)	(Estonia) Martin Rauam	(Estonia) Silver Kütt	Mitsubishi Lancer Evo IX	4:14:05.7	57.8	6

== Championship standings after the event ==
=== Drivers' championship ===
Pos	Driver	MON (Monaco)	SWE (Sweden)	MEX (Mexico)	ARG (Argentina)	JOR (Jordan)	ITA (Italy)	GRC (Greece)	TUR (Turkey)	FIN (Finland)	GER (Germany)	NZL (New Zealand)	ESP (Spain)	FRA (France)	JPN (Japan)	GBR (United Kingdom)	Pts
1	(France) Sébastien Loeb	1	Ret.	1	1	10	1	1	3	1	1	1					86
2	(Finland) Mikko Hirvonen	2	2	4	5	1	2	3	1	2	4	3					78
3	(Spain) Dani Sordo	11	6	17	3	2	5	5	4	4	2	2					51
4	(Australia) Chris Atkinson	3	21	2	2	3	6	Ret.	13	3	6	Ret.					40
5	(Finland) Jari-Matti Latvala	12	1	3	15	7	3	7	2	39	9	Ret.					34
6	(Norway) Petter Solberg	5	4	12	Ret.	Ret.	10	2	6	6	5	4					32
7	(Norway) Henning Solberg	9	13	5	Ret.	4	7	8	5	5	5	9					22
8	(Italy) Gigi Galli	6	3	Ret.	7	8	4	Ret.	Ret.	Ret.	Ret.						17
9	(United Kingdom) Matthew Wilson	10	Ret.	6	Ret.	5	12	6	7	9	12	17					12
10	(Belgium) François Duval	4									3	Ret.					11
10	(Estonia) Urmo Aava		18			Ret.	8	4	Ret.	16	8	5					11
12	(Argentina) Federico Villagra			7	6	6	14	13	9	Ret.		8					9
13	(Zimbabwe) Conrad Rautenbach	Ret.	16	16	4	26	13	10	8	10	10	Ret.					6
14	(Finland) Toni Gardemeister	Ret.	7	Ret.	Ret.	Ret.	Ret.	9	Ret.	8	10	7					5
15	(Norway) Andreas Mikkelsen		5				Ret.		26	12	11						4
16	(Sweden) Per-Gunnar Andersson	8	Ret.	Ret.	24	Ret.	9	11	Ret.	Ret.	15	6					4
17	(France) Jean-Marie Cuoq	7															2
17	(Finland) Matti Rantanen									7							2
18	(Finland) Juho Hänninen		8						21	13		14					1
18	(France) Sébastien Ogier			8		11	22			36	19						1
18	(Austria) Andreas Aigner		31		8			14	11	Ret.		Ret.					1
Pos	Driver	MON (Monaco)	SWE (Sweden)	MEX (Mexico)	ARG (Argentina)	JOR (Jordan)	ITA (Italy)	GRC (Greece)	TUR (Turkey)	FIN (Finland)	GER (Germany)	NZL (New Zealand)	ESP (Spain)	FRA (France)	JPN (Japan)	GBR (United Kingdom)	Pts

Key
Colour	Result
Gold	Winner
Silver	2nd place
Bronze	3rd place
Green	Points finish
Blue	Non-points finish
Blue	Non-classified finish (NC)
Purple	Did not finish (Ret)
Black	Excluded (EX)
Black	Disqualified (DSQ)
White	Did not start (DNS)
White	Cancelled (C)
Blank	Withdrew entry from the event (WD)

=== Manufacturers' championship ===
Rank	Team	Event															Total points
Rank	Team	MON (Monaco)	SWE (Sweden)	MEX (Mexico)	ARG (Argentina)	JOR (Jordan)	ITA (Italy)	GRC (Greece)	TUR (Turkey)	FIN (Finland)	GER (Germany)	NZL (New Zealand)	ESP (Spain)	FRA (France)	JPN (Japan)	GBR (United Kingdom)	Total points
1	(France) Citroën Total World Rally Team	11	4	10	16	9	14	15	11	15	18	18	-	-	-	-	141
2	(United Kingdom) BP Ford World Rally Team	8	18	11	7	13	14	10	18	9	7	6	-	-	-	-	121
3	(Japan) Subaru World Rally Team	10	6	9	8	6	3	8	3	9	7	5	-	-	-	-	74
4	(United Kingdom) Stobart M-Sport Ford Rally Team	8	8	3	3	7	5	3	4	4	6	0	-	-	-	-	51
5	(Argentina) Munchi's Ford World Rally Team	0	0	6	4	4	2	0	3	0	0	3	-	-	-	-	22
6	(Japan) Suzuki World Rally Team	2	3	0	1	0	1	3	0	2	1	7	-	-	-	-	20
