= 2009 Rally Catalunya =

Motor racing competition

2009 Rally Catalunya 45è RACC Rally de Catalunya
Round 11 of the 2009 World Rally Championship
← Previous event	Next event →
- Rally base: Salou, Catalonia, Spain
- Dates run: 2 – 4 October 2009
- Stages: 18
- Stage surface: Tarmac

Statistics
- Crews: 69 at start, 52 at finish

Overall results
- Overall winner: (France) Sébastien Loeb (France) Citroën Total WRT

The 2009 RACC Rallye de Catalunya was the eleventh round of the 2009 World Rally Championship season and the 45th running of Rally Catalunya. The rally consisted of 18 special stages and took place between October 2–4, 2009. Citroën's Sébastien Loeb and Dani Sordo took their fourth Catalunya double win in a row. Loeb's title rival Mikko Hirvonen of Ford finished third and will head to the season-ending Rally GB with a one-point lead over Loeb. Petter Solberg made his debut in a Citroën C4 WRC, finishing fourth and recording four stage wins.

== Results ==
Pos.	Driver	Co-driver	Car	Time	Penalty	Difference	Points
WRC
1	(France) Sébastien Loeb	(Monaco) Daniel Elena	Citroën C4 WRC	3:22:14.7		0.0	10
2	(Spain) Dani Sordo	(Spain) Marc Martí	Citroën C4 WRC	3:22:26.7		+12.0	8
3	(Finland) Mikko Hirvonen	(Finland) Jarmo Lehtinen	Ford Focus RS WRC 09	3:23:08.8		+54.1	6
4	(Norway) Petter Solberg	(United Kingdom) Phil Mills	Citroën C4 WRC	3:23:27.1		+1:12.4	5
5	(France) Sébastien Ogier	(France) Julien Ingrassia	Citroën C4 WRC	3:23:56.3		+1:41.6	4
6	(Finland) Jari-Matti Latvala	(Finland) Miikka Anttila	Ford Focus RS WRC 09	3:25:04.5		+2:49.8	3
7	(United Kingdom) Matthew Wilson	(United Kingdom) Scott Martin	Ford Focus RS WRC 08	3:29:30.2		+7:15.5	2
8	(Argentina) Federico Villagra	(Argentina) Jorge Pérez Companc	Ford Focus RS WRC 08	3:30:42.8		+8:28.1	1
JWRC
1	(Netherlands) Hans Weijs	(Belgium) Bjorn Degandt	Citroën C2 S1600	3:40:25.5	0:10	0.0	10
2	(Italy) Simone Bertolotti	(Italy) Luca Celestini	Suzuki Swift S1600	3:45:24.6		+4:49.1	8
3	(Spain) Jordi Martí	(Spain) Gabriel Sánchez	Renault Clio Sport R3	3:45:58.3	1:00	+6:22.8	6
4	(Netherlands) Kevin Abbring	(Belgium) Erwin Mombaerts	Renault Clio RS R3	3:55:18.1	0:20	+15:02.6	5
5	(Germany) Aaron Nikolai Burkart	(Germany) Michael Kölbach	Suzuki Swift S1600	4:06:48.5		+26:13.0	4

== Special stages ==
Day	Stage	Time (CEST)	Name	Length	Winner	Time	Rally leader
1 (2 Oct)	SS1	08:46	La Mussara 1	20.48 km	(Spain) Dani Sordo	11:33.4	(Spain) Dani Sordo
1 (2 Oct)	SS2	10:24	Querol 1	21.26 km	(Spain) Dani Sordo	11:22.0	(Spain) Dani Sordo
1 (2 Oct)	SS3	11:07	El Montmell 1	24.14 km	(Spain) Dani Sordo	12:37.6	(Spain) Dani Sordo
1 (2 Oct)	SS4	13:54	La Mussara 2	20.48 km	(Spain) Dani Sordo	11:17.4	(Spain) Dani Sordo
1 (2 Oct)	SS5	15:32	Querol 2	21.26 km	(France) Sébastien Loeb	11:17.4	(Spain) Dani Sordo
1 (2 Oct)	SS6	16:15	El Montmell 2	24.14 km	(France) Sébastien Loeb	12:34.2	(Spain) Dani Sordo
2 (3 Oct)	SS7	9:14	El Priorat/La Ribera d'Ebre 1	38.27 km	(France) Sébastien Loeb	21:44.6	(France) Sébastien Loeb
2 (3 Oct)	SS8	10:27	Les Garrigues 1	8.6 km	(France) Sébastien Ogier	5:05.5	(France) Sébastien Loeb
2 (3 Oct)	SS9	10:58	La Llena 1	17.12 km	(Spain) Dani Sordo	9:38.1	(Spain) Dani Sordo
2 (3 Oct)	SS10	14:17	El Priorat/La Ribera d'Ebre 2	38.27 km	(France) Sébastien Ogier	21:46.1	(Spain) Dani Sordo
2 (3 Oct)	SS11	15:30	Les Garrigues 2	8.6 km	(France) Sébastien Loeb	5:06.0	(Spain) Dani Sordo
2 (3 Oct)	SS12	16:01	La Llena 2	17.12 km	(Norway) Petter Solberg	9:49.0	(France) Sébastien Loeb
3 (4 Oct)	SS13	08:05	Riudecanyes 1	16.32 km	(Spain) Dani Sordo	10:32.6	(France) Sébastien Loeb
3 (4 Oct)	SS14	09:06	Santa Marina 1	26.51 km	(Norway) Petter Solberg	15:52.3	(France) Sébastien Loeb
3 (4 Oct)	SS15	10:02	La Serra d'Almos 1	4.11 km	(France) Sébastien Loeb	2:37.8	(France) Sébastien Loeb
3 (4 Oct)	SS16	12:01	Riudecanyes 2	16.32 km	(Norway) Petter Solberg	10:32.8	(France) Sébastien Loeb
3 (4 Oct)	SS17	13:02	Santa Marina 2	26.51 km	(Norway) Petter Solberg	15:53.9	(France) Sébastien Loeb
3 (4 Oct)	SS18	13:58	La Serra d'Almos 2	4.11 km	(Finland) Jari-Matti Latvala	2:39.5	(France) Sébastien Loeb
