= 2008 Rallye Deutschland =

Motor rally competition

2008 Rallye Deutschland 27.ADAC Rallye Deutschland
Round 10 of the 2008 World Rally Championship
← Previous event	Next event →
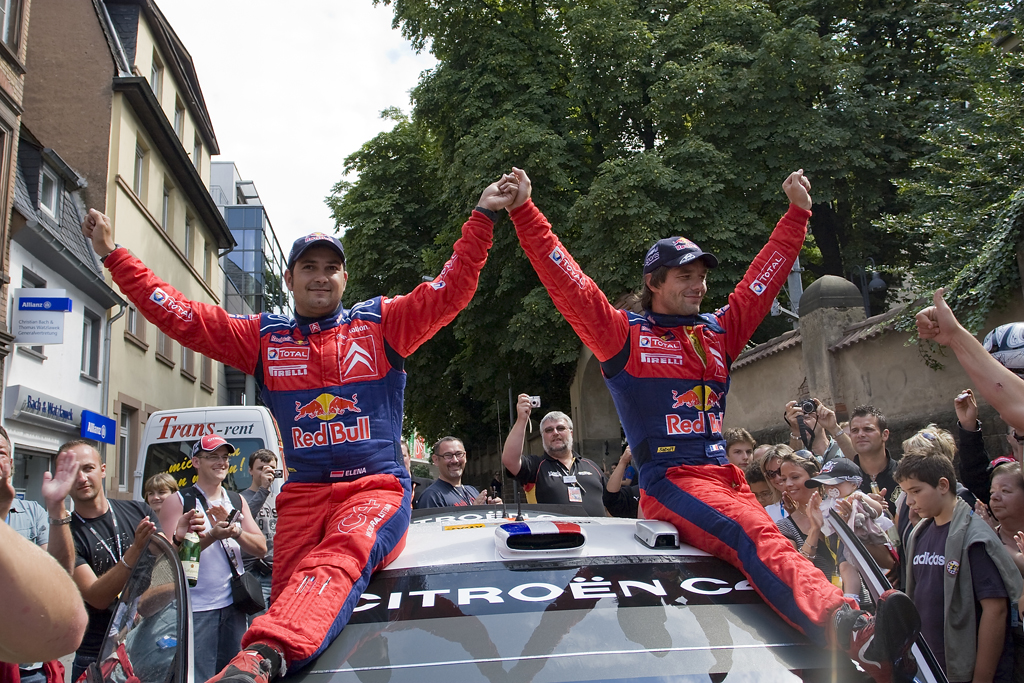
- Loeb and co-driver Daniel Elena celebrating the victory.
- Host country: Germany
- Rally base: Trier
- Dates run: August 15 – 17 2008
- Stages: 19 (352.89 km; 219.28 miles)
- Stage surface: Tarmac
- Overall distance: 1,165.09 km (723.95 miles)

Statistics
- Crews: 81 at start, 57 at finish

Overall results
- Overall winner: (France) Sébastien Loeb; Citroën Total World Rally Team

The 2008 Rallye Deutschland was the tenth round of the 2008 World Rally Championship season. The event ran from August 15 to August 17 and was won by Sébastien Loeb for the seventh consecutive year.

The rally marked the first time a driver had won a WRC event seven times in a row, and the second time a driver had won the same event seven times during his career, after Marcus Grönholm's seven wins in the Rally Finland. Loeb's teammate Dani Sordo took second place, eventually starting a series of three double wins for the Citroën Total World Rally Team.

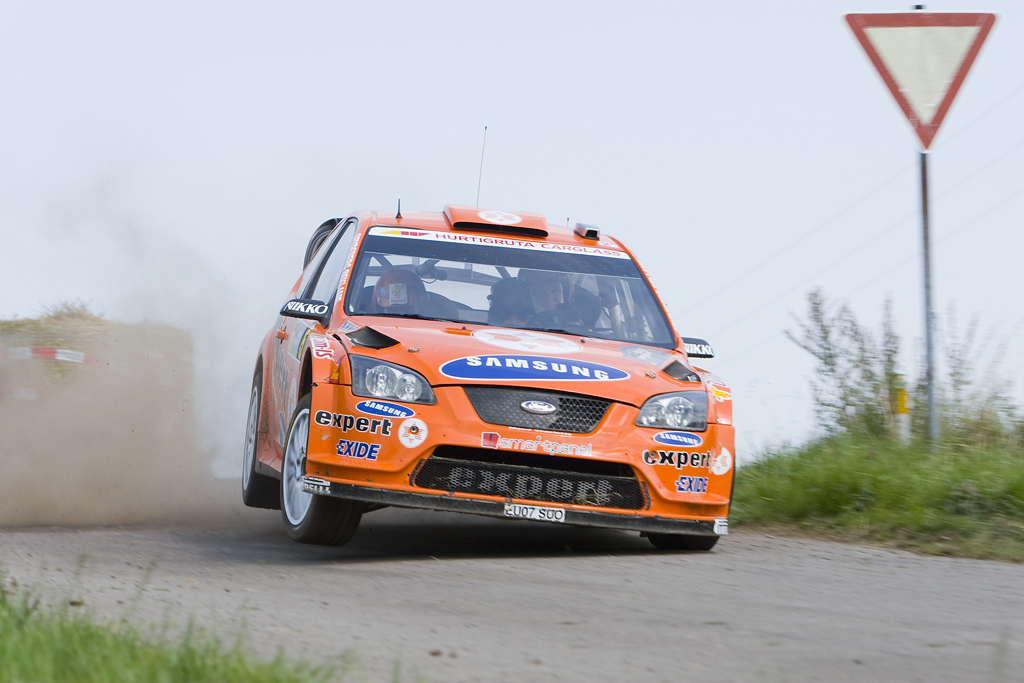
Henning Solberg driving his Ford Focus RS WRC 07.

Stobart M-Sport Ford driver François Duval beat factory Ford driver Mikko Hirvonen to the last podium place. Subaru's Petter Solberg and Chris Atkinson took the following positions, and Henning Solberg edged out Urmo Aava to take two points for seventh place. In the Junior World Rally Championship, Sébastien Ogier closed in on the title with his third win of the season.

Gigi Galli retired after crashing heavily on the fifth stage and fracturing his left femur. The recovery was expected to take five months, and he missed the five last rallies of the season.

== Results ==
Pos.	Driver	Co-driver	Car	Time	Difference	Points
WRC
1.	(France) Sébastien Loeb	(Monaco) Daniel Elena	Citroën C4 WRC	3:26:19.7	0.0	10
2.	(Spain) Dani Sordo	(Spain) Marc Martí	Citroën C4 WRC	3:27:07.4	47.7	8
3.	(Belgium) François Duval	(France) Patrick Pivato	Ford Focus RS WRC 07	3:27:39.7	1:20.0	6
4.	(Finland) Mikko Hirvonen	(Finland) Jarmo Lehtinen	Ford Focus RS WRC 07	3:27:49.8	1:30.1	5
5.	(Norway) Petter Solberg	(United Kingdom) Phil Mills	Subaru Impreza WRC 2008	3:28:55.0	2:35.3	4
6.	(Australia) Chris Atkinson	(Belgium) Stéphane Prévot	Subaru Impreza WRC 2008	3:31:05.6	4:45.9	3
7.	(Norway) Henning Solberg	(Norway) Cato Menkerud	Ford Focus RS WRC 07	3:31:55.9	5:36.2	2
8.	(Estonia) Urmo Aava	(Estonia) Kuldar Sikk	Citroën C4 WRC	3:31:57.5	5:37.8	1

== Championship standings after the event ==
=== Drivers' championship ===
Pos	Driver	MON (Monaco)	SWE (Sweden)	MEX (Mexico)	ARG (Argentina)	JOR (Jordan)	ITA (Italy)	GRC (Greece)	TUR (Turkey)	FIN (Finland)	GER (Germany)	NZL (New Zealand)	ESP (Spain)	FRA (France)	JPN (Japan)	GBR (United Kingdom)	Pts
1	(France) Sébastien Loeb	1	Ret.	1	1	10	1	1	3	1	1						76
2	(Finland) Mikko Hirvonen	2	2	4	5	1	2	3	1	2	4						72
3	(Spain) Dani Sordo	11	6	17	3	2	5	5	4	4	2						43
4	(Australia) Chris Atkinson	3	21	2	2	3	6	Ret.	13	3	6						40
5	(Finland) Jari-Matti Latvala	12	1	3	15	7	3	7	2	39	9						34
6	(Norway) Petter Solberg	5	4	12	Ret.	Ret.	10	2	6	6	5						27
7	(Norway) Henning Solberg	9	13	5	Ret.	4	7	8	5	5	7						22
8	(Italy) Gigi Galli	6	3	Ret.	7	8	4	Ret.	Ret.	Ret.	Ret.						17
9	(United Kingdom) Matthew Wilson	10	Ret.	6	Ret.	5	12	6	7	9	12						12
10	(Belgium) François Duval	4									3						11
11	(Argentina) Federico Villagra			7	6	6	14	13	9	Ret.							8
12	(Estonia) Urmo Aava		18			Ret.	8	4	Ret.	16	8						7
13	(Zimbabwe) Conrad Rautenbach	Ret.	16	16	4	26	13	10	8	10	10						6
14	(Norway) Andreas Mikkelsen		5				Ret.		26	12	11						4
15	(Finland) Toni Gardemeister	Ret.	7	Ret.	Ret.	Ret.	Ret.	9	Ret.	8	10						3
16	(France) Jean-Marie Cuoq	7															2
16	(Finland) Matti Rantanen									7							2
18	(Sweden) Per-Gunnar Andersson	8	Ret.	Ret.	24	Ret.	9	11	Ret.	Ret.	15						1
18	(Finland) Juho Hänninen		8						21	13							1
18	(France) Sébastien Ogier			8		11	22			36	19						1
18	(Austria) Andreas Aigner		31		8			14	11	Ret.							1
Pos	Driver	MON (Monaco)	SWE (Sweden)	MEX (Mexico)	ARG (Argentina)	JOR (Jordan)	ITA (Italy)	GRC (Greece)	TUR (Turkey)	FIN (Finland)	GER (Germany)	NZL (New Zealand)	ESP (Spain)	FRA (France)	JPN (Japan)	GBR (United Kingdom)	Pts

Key
Colour	Result
Gold	Winner
Silver	2nd place
Bronze	3rd place
Green	Points finish
Blue	Non-points finish
Blue	Non-classified finish (NC)
Purple	Did not finish (Ret)
Black	Excluded (EX)
Black	Disqualified (DSQ)
White	Did not start (DNS)
White	Cancelled (C)
Blank	Withdrew entry from the event (WD)

=== Manufacturers' championship ===
Rank	Team	Event															Total points
Rank	Team	MON (Monaco)	SWE (Sweden)	MEX (Mexico)	ARG (Argentina)	JOR (Jordan)	ITA (Italy)	GRC (Greece)	TUR (Turkey)	FIN (Finland)	GER (Germany)	NZL (New Zealand)	ESP (Spain)	FRA (France)	JPN (Japan)	GBR (United Kingdom)	Total points
1	(France) Citroën Total World Rally Team	11	4	10	16	9	14	15	11	15	18	-	-	-	-	-	123
2	(United Kingdom) BP Ford World Rally Team	8	18	11	7	13	14	10	18	9	7	-	-	-	-	-	115
3	(Japan) Subaru World Rally Team	10	6	9	8	6	3	8	3	9	7	-	-	-	-	-	69
4	(United Kingdom) Stobart VK M-Sport Ford Rally Team	8	8	3	3	7	5	3	4	4	6	-	-	-	-	-	51
5	(Argentina) Munchi's Ford World Rally Team	0	0	6	4	4	2	0	3	0	0	-	-	-	-	-	19
6	(Japan) Suzuki World Rally Team	2	3	0	1	0	1	3	0	2	1	-	-	-	-	-	13
