= 2007 Monte Carlo Rally =

Coordinates: 44.9333°N 4.8917°E

2007 Monte Carlo Rally 75e Rallye Automobile Monte-Carlo
Round 1 of the 2007 World Rally Championship
Next event →
- Route map of the 2007 Monte Carlo Rally
- Host country: Monaco
- Rally base: Valence, Drôme, France
- Dates run: 18 – 21 January 2007
- Stages: 15 (328.54 km; 204.15 miles)
- Stage surface: Tarmac
- Overall distance: 1,185.22 km (736.46 miles)

Statistics
- Crews: 47 at start, 39 at finish

Overall results
- Overall winner: (France) Sébastien Loeb (driver) (Monaco) Daniel Elena (co-driver) (France) Citroën Total World Rally Team (manufacturer)

The 2007 Monte Carlo Rally (formally known as the 75^{e} Rallye Automobile Monte-Carlo) was a rallying autosports race held over four days between 18 January and 21 January 2007, and operated out of Valence, Drôme, France. It was the first race of the 2007 World Rally Championship (WRC) season. Contested over fifteen stages at a length of 328.54 kilometres (204.15 miles), Sébastien Loeb won the race for the Citroën Total World Rally Team. Dani Sordo finished second in the other Citroën works car, with Marcus Grönholm finishing third in a Ford.

Loeb, driving an all new Citroën C4 WRC car which had been in development throughout 2006, took control of the race from the outset, winning the two stages on the first day and four more stages over the following three days. His teammate Sordo kept the pressure on, winning three stages, but on Stage 6, Loeb extended his lead from 6.6 seconds to nearly 24 seconds, and from thereon became unattainable. Each stage on the first two Legs were won by either Loeb or Sordo, and it was not until Saturday afternoon on the second run of the day's stages, that other drivers could effectively challenge them. The last two days of the race consisted of a duel between Mikko Hirvonen, who drove a factory 2006 model Ford Focus RS WRC, and Chris Atkinson in a factory Subaru Impreza WRC 2006. After Hirvonen completed Stage 2 in fourth place, Atkinson took the position on Stage 3 and held onto it throughout Friday and into Saturday morning's stages. On Stage 12 on Saturday afternoon, Hirvonen retook fourth, Atkinson regained it on Stage 13 but then lost it to Hirvonen again following Stage 14. Atkinson won the final stage on Sunday morning, and finished the race back in fourth position.

Controversially, the 2007 Monte Carlo Rally was no longer based in Monaco and localities nearby, where it had been held in recent years. The event only visited Monte Carlo with its final special stage, a short run on part of the Circuit de Monaco and the rest of the time was spent in and around Valence hundreds of kilometres north of Monaco in the Rhône-Alpes region. Many of the locations had not been visited since the 1990s, such as the Vercors and Ardèche, and only one top level driver had competitively driven on the roads before. The 2007 event also marked the return of the nighttime stages.

Loeb's win was his fourth at Monte Carlo and twenty-ninth in WRC. It was the sixth time that he had achieved a podium position there, which brought his WRC podium finishes to forty-eight. He earned ten points in the World Rally Championship for Drivers. Sordo was two points behind him, while Grönholm was in third position with six points. With Atkinson and Hirvonen in fourth and fifth place, Petter Solberg, Toni Gardemeister and Jan Kopecký were the other points finishers. In the World Rally Championship for Manufacturers, Citroën Total World Rally Team earned the maximum eighteen points for their 1–2 finish, BP Ford World Rally Team placed second, with ten points, with the Subaru World Rally Team placing third with eight points.

== Report ==
=== Background ===
The 2007 Monte Carlo Rally was the first round of the 2007 World Rally Championship (WRC) season after taking a six-week break since the last race of the 2006 season in Great Britain. It was held over four days from Thursday, 18 January to Sunday, 21 January 2007. With pressure from the president of Fédération Française du Sport Automobile and being beset with criticism for running a chaotic route in the 2006 Monte Carlo Rally, Automobile Club de Monaco (ACM), the rally organisers, chose to move 2007's race away from Monte Carlo and the roads around Alpes-Maritimes and other departments within the Provence-Alpes-Côte d'Azur region. Instead, the rally HQ was set up in Valence, Drôme, almost 400 km (250 mi) away from Monte Carlo, with most stages being held in Ardèche. While some stages were brand new to the rally, some places, such as Saint-Jean-en-Royans, Burzet, Saint-Martial, Lalouvesc, Saint-Bonnet-le-Froid, Saint-Barthélemy-Grozon, and the Saint-Pierreville – Antraigues-sur-Volane route had played host to Monte Carlo Rally stages in the 1990s and earlier. Only Manfred Stohl, driving for OMV-Kronos Citroën World Rally Team, was familiar with these roads, as he had competed on them in the late 1990s.

Although the 25,000 spectators seemed pleased that the rally had returned to the region, the drivers, team bosses and Fédération Internationale de l'Automobile (FIA; WRC's governing body) were less enthusiastic. Over a total distance of 1,185.22 kilometres (736.46 miles), the fifteen stages totalled 328.54 competitive km (204.15 miles), which was shorter than the FIA's regulatory minimum of 360 km (220 mi) for Special Stages. The drivers hoped that with the rally taking place on higher altitudes, wintery conditions and burle (a freezing wind blowing from the north) would produce ice and snow on the ground, making for a more exciting event; however, except for some rain on Thursday evening it never came to fruition and the prevailing weather was clear and dry. Sébastien Loeb was unhappy with the weekend's weather forecast. Following his reconnaissance run, he said, "With snow everywhere and walls on both sides of the road, like in the old days, some of these stages would have been brilliant. But because it's dry, in some places that makes it less interesting because than the roads further south with all their corners." The service park in Valence was also much smaller than what had been used in Monaco, so there were no Production World Rally Championship or Junior Rally Championship categories, and fewer entries of competitors. It was also badly located and poorly run, and WRC's commercial director David Richards said that the service area was "like a car boot sale".

After being absent from the WRC for the 2006 season to spend thirteen months concentrating on preparing their new Citroën C4 WRC vehicle, the Citroën Total World Rally Team returned in 2007 ready to début it in the Monte Carlo Rally. The Citroën Xsara WRC had dominated the championship in recent years, and despite its age it was still incredibly reliable and was only replaced because the Xsara model was no longer in production. The C4's mechanical components, such as the engine, transmission, differentials and suspension were either very similar to, or came from, the Xsara, but the wheelbase and chassis were longer by 253 millimetres (10.0 inches) and 107 mm (4.2 in), respectively, which meant that under WRC rules the C4 could be widened to 1,800 mm (71 in). It was also higher than the Xsara, and the weight distribution had been fine-tuned, including raising and moving back the front seats (which had the negative effect of reducing the drivers' visibility), and attaching the wing mirrors to the midpoint along the front doors. The C4's test drivers reported that the car handled more stably.

Citroën was confident the C4 would be successful yet concerned as to whether it would beat the Ford Focus WRC 06, which had won the World Rally Championship for Manufacturers title in 2006 for the BP-Ford World Rally Team. The Focus, in addition had undergone its own developments during the winter break. The tarmac testing of the C4 showed it to be faster than the outgoing Xsara, but Loeb knew that that performance might not show itself in the race. "The car has been good in testing. But what about the rally?" he asked. "I don't know." Marcus Grönholm, the Ford team's number 1 driver, was wary, however. "It's got thousands of k's on the clock. It was running when the Focus WRC 06 was still on the board." Meanwhile, the Subaru World Rally Team were waiting for the Subaru Impreza WRC 2007 to be ready for the 2007 Rally Mexico in March. The team knew that the 2006 version, which had performed poorly the previous season, would be no match for the Focus or C4. Added to the fact that the cars were equipped with unfamiliar BF Goodrich tyres after Pirelli decided not to supply any teams in 2007, and they were hoping that Petter Solberg and Chris Atkinson could just earn some points from the race.

Forty-nine crews registered to compete in the rally, Of the top-tier drivers entered, Jean-Marie Cuoq was the only WRC rookie, and Chris Atkinson, Henning Solberg, and Matthew Wilson had driven at Monte Carlo only once before, all in 2006. The starting order for Leg 1 was "Priority 1" (P1) and P2 WRC drivers in the order of the final classification of the 2006 season, followed by all other drivers as decided by the ACM. Loeb, the previous season's champion, set off first, followed by Grönholm, then Mikko Hirvonen. Loeb and Grönholm were the favourites to win; Loeb had won the Monte Carlo three times in a row between 2003 and 2005, and Grönholm had won in 2006. Nevertheless, there were worries that Loeb would not be physically fit enough to win. Four months earlier he had broken his left shoulder in a mountain-biking accident, and there was a chance he might not even compete in the first part of the season. His physiotherapists and consultants told him that because of the operations he had had on his arm, he should definitely have sat out the Monte Carlo Rally. Loeb admitted that he was "really stressed" before the start, and wondered whether his arm would be okay. "It has been okay in testing but what about the long stages?" he asked. His answer: "I don't know."

=== Race ===
Following a ten-year absence of nighttime-run stages, the first two Special Stages of the event were held on Thursday night. They were the first night stages scheduled in the rally since 1997. Throughout the day it had rained, and although it had stopped before the race began, the roads were still very wet and slippery. In discussing the day's weather, Grönholm said that he expected the stages that night to be difficult, and added, "I hope this time we can take the right tyres, we were always a little bit on the wrong side [last year] – it’s not easy, but I hope we will manage to get it right this time." Earlier in the day, the crews had driven a shakedown stage in Mauves; however, due to a large number of fans and spectators along the route the shakedown was stopped early, and some crews including Loeb and co-driver Daniel Elena were forced to carry out last-minute testing and necessary changes to their cars on the main roads back to Valence. Though forty-nine crews registered in the rally, only forty-seven actually competed. Privateers François Duval driving a Škoda Fabia WRC, and Angelo Villa in a Fiat Punto failed to start the event.

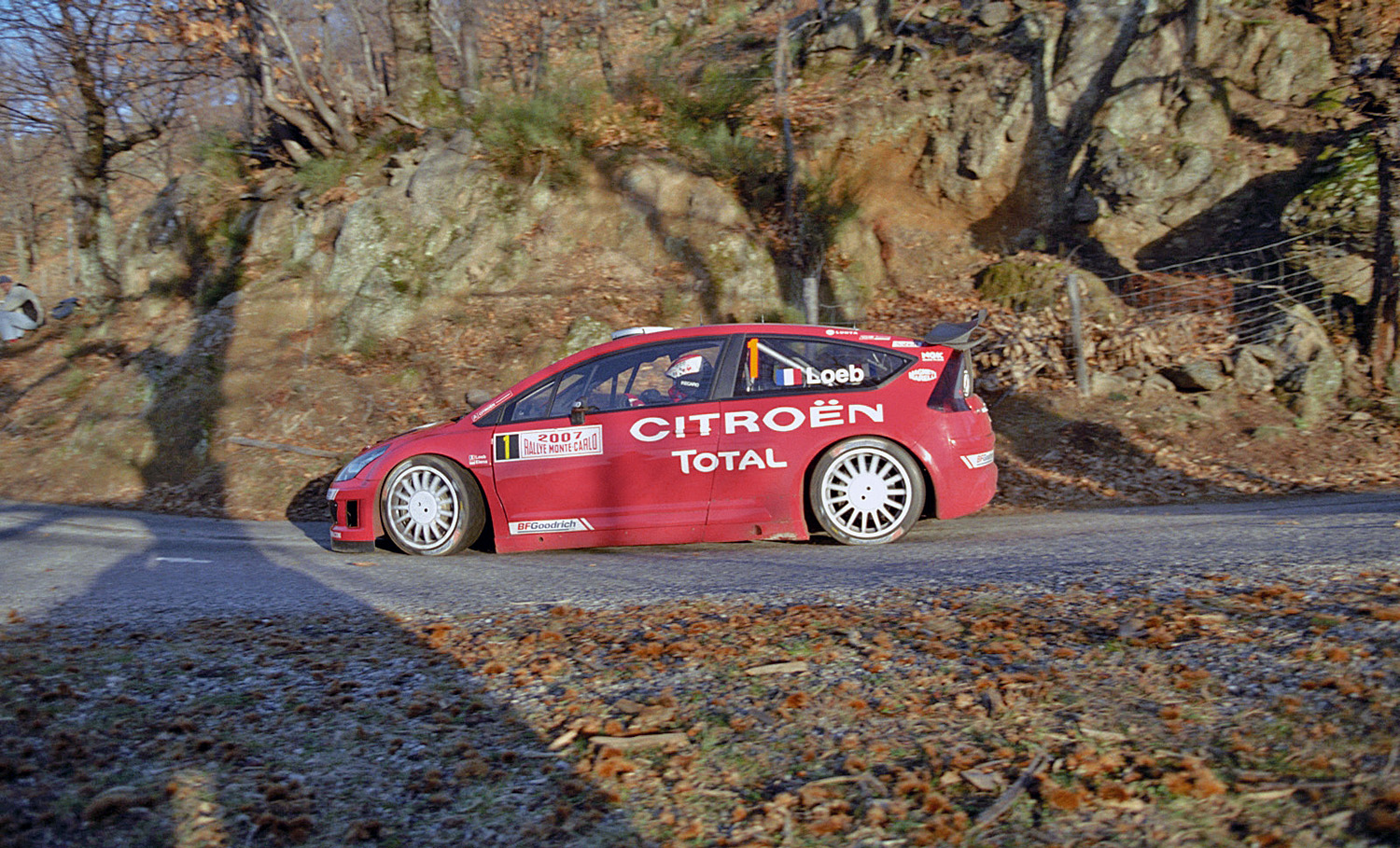
The Citroën C4 WRC, driven by Sébastien Loeb and Daniel Elena, made its début during the Monte Carlo Rally. It was Loeb's first rally since breaking his arm four months prior.

The first stage of the rally started at 19:16 Central European Time (UTC+1) on Thursday evening. The 28.52 kilometres (17.72 miles) winding route led the crews between Saint-Jean-en-Royans and Col de Lachau. Before taking to the tarmac, Chris Atkinson, in a 2006 Impreza WRC for the Subaru WRT, admitted to never driving a tarmac stage at night before, but said it would be interesting to see how everybody performed. His teammate Petter Solberg spoke of the challenges facing him: "[In the dark] everything gets a little bit more narrow and you always tend to be careful with how you turn in and keep the speed up in the corners, but obviously you have to listen to the pacenotes, that is absolutely crucial thing, 100%." Loeb, who was familiar with driving on nighttime stages in the French Rally Championship, said, "In the dark you have to drive like you can when you have only two passes on the recce, and then you also start with the fastest stage. I think there can be some big moments tonight." Loeb and Elena took to the road first in their C4, and despite the limited visibility from both his ride position and the unlit roads, he set a pace time of 13m 58.7s. His teammate Dani Sordo and co-driver Marc Marti were able to keep up the pace, maxing out at 196 kilometres per hour (122 miles per hour) at one point along the route, and finished in 14m 07.2s for second place. Taking third place on the stage were the Ford crew of Grönholm and Timo Rautiainen, who finished after 14 m 13.9s. On Stage 2, a 17.88 km (11.11 mi) run from La Cime du Mas to Col de Gaudissart, Loeb held on to the lead, completing it in 9m 31.2s. Grönholm proved to be faster than Sordo on this stage, finishing with a time of 9m 45.5s, 1.1s faster than Sordo. At the end of Leg 1 and 46 km (29 mi), any worries about how well the new C4s would perform had been forgotten. They had beaten all the competition by a wide margin. Loeb was almost 25 seconds ahead of his teammate, while Grönholm was 30 seconds adrift; and Petter Solberg, over a minute behind the lead.

There were six stages in Leg 2 on Friday, totalling 150.62 competitive km (93.59 miles). Stage 3 was the first of these, starting at 08:19 CET in Saint-Pierreville. The route was 46.02 km (28.60 mi) long and finished in Antraigues. The previous leg's provisional classification determined the starting order for Leg 2, whereby the top 15 P1 and P2 drivers started in reverse order, followed by the remaining drivers in order of classification. Henning Solberg and Cato Menkelud, driving a 2006-spec Focus RS WRC for the Stobart VK M-Sport Ford Rally Team were the first crew to take to the still-damp roads, and they set a time of 32m 52.9s. Their teammates, Matthew Wilson and Michael Orr, completed the leg a minute quicker, at 31m 42.5s. With no snow and ice on the roads, Sordo, who proved to be very quick on the tarmac surfaces last season, was fastest on Stage 3. He set a time of 29m 43.4s, a wide margin ahead of Loeb's and Grönholm's second- and third-placed times of 29m 59.6s and 30m 01.1s, respectively. Loeb was said to be "visibly shaken" from losing the stage to his less-experienced teammate. "I lost 16 seconds, my tyres were too hard," he said. "At the start they went cold and I wasn't in a good rhythm. Before we reached some dry parts I wasn't confident and I didn't want to take any big risks this morning." Most drivers had problems with their tyre selection on Stage 3, including Petter Solberg and Hirvonen. Petter was still trying to get used to the new BF Goodriches his car was outfitted with, but he found them too hard and said he could not find any feeling or grip with them. Hirvonen, however, felt his tyre compound was too soft, and was unimpressed with his time. Hirvonen completed the stage ninth, in 30m 41.5s, but Petter's time of 30m 50.0s was even worse, putting him in 12th position. Petter's Subaru teammate Atkinson had no problems with his tyres, though, and he finished fourth with a time of 30m 03.5s. The Mitsubishi Lancer WRC crew of Xavier Pons and Xavier Amigo had other troubles during this stage. The transmission failed and they had to retire from the rally. Their teammates Toni Gardemeister and Jakke Honkanen set a good time on the stage when they finished in fifth place, as did OMV-Kronos's Manfred Stohl and Ilka Minor in sixth.

At the end of Stage 3, the podium positions were unchanged, but the time difference between Loeb and Sordo had decreased to seven seconds, although the gap between first place and fourth was over a minute. Petter Solberg had dropped out of contention for points, in ninth place overall, eighth being taken by Jan Kopecký in a privately entered Škoda Fabia WRC. Before Stages 4 and 5 got underway, the crews had a chance to change their tyres to a set with a more suitable compound. A new WRC rule for 2007 allowed for Remote Service Zones to be set up away from the main Service Park at Rally HQ. For 15 minutes the cars could be refuelled, re-tyred, and have any necessary maintenance carried out, as long as the parts and tools to do so (except fuel and tyres) were already in the vehicle. For Grönholm this was a major relief. On the previous stage his car had developed an issue with the hydraulic flappy-paddle gearchanges on his steering wheel, which meant he had had to resort to shifting gears manually. The technicians were unsure why or how it had occurred and were hoping that their repairs would last until the car got back to Valence. Loeb won an uneventful Stage 4, but only by one-tenth of a second ahead of Sordo, and on Stage 5 Sordo was quicker than Loeb, after Loeb stalled on the start-line and was unable to make up the lost seconds. At the midday break, Loeb was lamenting his lead over Sordo. "Now it's a big battle between the two C4s. The other cars for the moment are behind, so it's good news for the team. It would be easier if Dani were bit further behind but I have to deal wit that," he said. "I'll try to keep position this afternoon, but it's not easy. Dani is really fast. I only have a six-second lead." Grönholm was also complaining. " The only good thing here is to win this rally, but to drive here; I don't like it."

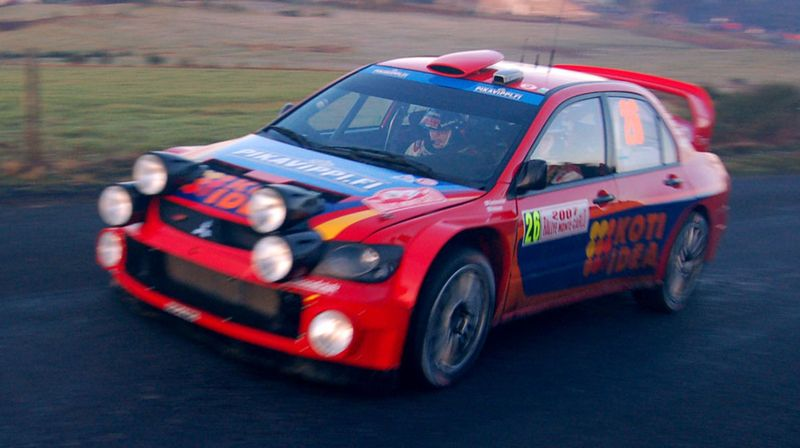
Toni Gardemeister and Jakke Honkanen finished the rally in 7th place driving a Mitsubishi Lancer WRC05 for MMSP Ltd, earning him 2 points in the World Rally Championship for Drivers.

Stage 6 was a rerun of the Saint-Pierreville – Antraigues stage from the morning. The roads had dried out by the afternoon, but that did not stop some crews from having accidents along the route. Stohl spun out as he went through a corner, and crashed the front of his car into the stone wall of a house. He continued on, but the front bumper was damaged and hanging loose. "We lost the front brakes completely," Stohl explained. "Absolutely no brakes. I was lucky to finish because I was nearly off sometimes." Despite his difficulties, he managed to finish the stage in 29m 37.6s which put him in 10th position for the stage, and 8th overall. The dry roads meant that all the drivers were able to complete the stage faster than they had been in the morning. At just 5 km (3.1 mi) Loeb was already much faster than his time during Stage 3, but on a narrow stretch of the route towards the Col de la Fayolle he did not brake into a corner at the right time and skidded and collided with a fence. He was able to carry on driving, but co-driver Elena's door and sill were damaged. Despite the accident, he won the stage, and increased the overall gap between himself and Sordo from 6.5 seconds to nearly 24 seconds. A repeat run of Stages 4 and 5 closed the day. Sordo won Stage 8 and Loeb took Stage 9. But by the end of the Leg and 550.02 km (341.77 mi) of driving, Loeb's arm and shoulder were in great pain and his osteopath worked through the night to try to address the problems.

Leg 3 began early Saturday morning. Following Friday's stages, Loeb was 25 seconds ahead of Sordo, and 1m 15s in front of Grönholm. Stage 9 was the first of the day, a 19.67 km (12.22 mi) route between Labatie-d'Andaure and Lalouvesc held in darkness. Loeb, Sordo, and Grönholm once again finished first, second and third. Atkinson suffered a setback when he crashed his car and stalled it. It cost him a few seconds and he finished the stage ninth, behind Hirvonen, Jean-Marie Cuoq, Gardemeister and Kopecký, but he retained his fourth place standing in the event's classifications. The surprise result of Stage 10 was Atkinson's. He broke Loeb's and Sordo's run and was the first fastest non-Citroën driver of the rally, and set a time of 12m 42s.

Henning Solberg, meanwhile, went off the road and into a ditch as he entered one of the corners on the stage, and his brother Petter had a similar problem in the same corner, but his quick reactions were able to control the car so he just drove into the scrub and got back on track. Henning finished in seventeenth place, and Petter finished joint-fifth with Cuoq on 12m 50.4s. Loeb ran his slowest time on this stage after he reduced speed and his tyres went cold. "I was a bit faster than Dani [Sordo] on the start of the stage, and then I saw my splits [times between checkpoints] and then I tried to slow down," he explained. "We had hard tyres and when you slow down the tyres [cool down] and then you lose the grip more and more, and at the end it was really tricky and I had cold tyres, so I just tried to slow down. The end [of the stage] was really tricky so I didn't want to take any risks." Stage 11 was won by Hirvonen with a time of 11m 46.9s. Loeb was 1.2s slower and finished second. Atkinson lost all the time he made up in Stage 10 by finishing in eighth place, 11.4 seconds slower than Hirvonen. This reduced the gap between the two in the overall classifications to just 8.9 seconds. Sordo, meanwhile, had his worst stage and finished in 10th position.

Special Stage 15 was the only stage of the Monte Carlo Rally to be held in Monte Carlo. It used the lower part of the Circuit de Monaco, normally reserved for the Monaco Grand Prix.

After the midday service, the next three stages were reruns of the morning's. Hirvonen won Stage 12 and Atkinson had another slow run, which resulted in Hirvonen taking fourth place in the provisional classification by four-tenths of a second. On Stage 13, Atkinson retook his fourth-placed position after winning the stage with a time of 12m 32.4w, and beating Hirvonen by 7.6 seconds. "Considering how ordinary I drove in the first one, I had to pull my finger out!" said Atkinson. He regained his fourth-place position just 7.2 seconds ahead of Hirvonen. Loeb was slow again, 6.7 seconds slower than his teammate, Sordo, which cut the time between them to 23.2 seconds. "No problem, the car is going very well," said Loeb. "One stage more to go and hopefully its okay."

Stage 14 was the last in the mountains of Ardeche, before travelling to Monte Carlo for the Super Special Stage. For most drivers it was going to be the last time to gain higher positions in the classifications. Loeb, although slow again, extended his lead in the standings to 31.1 seconds, by finishing in fourth position with a time of 11m 47.7s. Sordo also had another bad stage. He finished the stage ninth-fastest after 11m 55.6s on the road. For Hirvonen, it was the last good chance to retake fourth position from Atkinson, which he did when he won the stage by setting the pace time of 11m 30.5s. Atkinson ran 8 seconds slower and finished second. It was also Jari-Matti Latvala's last chance to earn a points position. Kopecký had been in eighth position and set to score one point since the middle of the second Leg, but Latvala was just 5.4 seconds behind him going into this stage. But Latvala pushed too hard and when he drove over some loose gravel he lost control and slid the car into the end of a stone wall. The impact caused damage to the car's roll cage which forced him to retire from the rally and end his attempt to earn any points.

The final stage of the rally took place on Sunday morning. After conducting the entire race in France the organisers only paid lip service to the principality by holding a Super Special Stage there. It involved two laps of part of the Circuit de Monaco for a total distance of 2.8 km (1.7 mi), with two cars on the road at the same time but starting at two different points along the track so that they did not interfere with each other. Because the Service Park was in Valence, repairs, adjustments, refuelling and tyre changes were carried out on Saturday night ahead of the drive down to the coast. The decision about which tyres to fit on the cars was taken out of the teams' hands. ACM ordered that all the cars would drive on the snow tyres that the teams had been allocated, but had not been used because of the dry weather, a decision that was described as "absurd" because the cars ended up drifting through the corners. Loeb's, Sordo's and Grönholm's lead times so far ahead of anyone else's, so the interest in Stage 15 was on Hirvonen and Atkinson. Only eight-tenths of a second made the difference between a fourth-place position and five points, and fifth-placed position and four points. Hirvonen, who was in fourth place, completed the stage in 1m 50.9s, and admitted, "[I made] a few small mistakes, and that can be it. Nothing more I can do. We'll see how Chris drives and hope for the best.". Atkinson drove opposite Grönholm on the stage, with Hirvonen watching from the sidelines. To beat Hirvonen, he had to complete the stage in 1m 50.0s. He was one-tenth of a second quicker than that, which won him the stage and fourth place in the rally.

=== Post-race ===
Loeb was delighted with his win at Monte Carlo, saying, "It's a victory in Monte Carlo so that's a great moment. I like to start the season like this, with ten points. That's really important for me, the feeling is good. The car is really, really fast and my arm is much better, so everything is perfect for the moment." Guy Fréquelin, the Team Principal at Citroën Total was also pleased with Leob's and Sordo's results. He said afterwards,

It's a really a fantastic start for Citroën, for the team, for the crews. It's really fantastic, and for the chief, for sure! This is the result of a huge team effort. To do this in the first event, every member of the Citroën Sport team had to come together in a common goal. I think it's a wonderful reward for our pus to come back to the World Championship. It's not often that a car making its competition début produces results like these: nine fastest times, eight on them 1–2s. And there aren't many models that have dominated and scored a 1–2 finish in their first race, either. The Citroën C4 WRC has really made its presence felt on its international début.

The last time a car had finished in first and second-place in its début rally was 20 years ago in the 1987 Monte Carlo Rally, when Miki Biasion and Juha Kankkunen came first and second in all-new Lancia Delta HF 4WDs. The Delta HF 4×4 also won two-thirds of all the stages of that 1987 rally, just like the C4 did this time around. Lancia also won both the Group A and Group N categories in the race, while Citroën won the 4-wheel drive WRC category and came first in the 2-wheel drive Super 1600 category.

"For me this victory was one of the best, because we had a lot of questions before the start. I was a bit stressed on Thursday; it was a lot we didn’t know. The feeling was good, but in the race you need to be able to improvise and be confident in the car and we didn’t know. Also my arm, it was my first race in four months, some new stages, rain and in the night – it was a lot of new things. For us it’s good news to see the C4 was competitive and to fight for the victory and to win."

— Sébastien Loeb, commenting on the weekend in the post-race press conference.

Grönholm was disappointed with his race, admitting that he thought he might be able to beat Sordo, if not Loeb. But after having gearbox and tyre problems on Leg 2, he settled into third place and stayed in that position to the rally's conclusion. "We got it wrong on the tyre choice, which we had to have approved by the FIA early in the week," he explained. "We thought it would rain. Harder tyres would have made life easier for us." BP-Ford was also unhappy. Christian Loriaux, the team's Technical Director said, "Having Marcus finish behind Sordo is disappointing. Being behind Loeb is easier to understand, because I didn't expect the C4 to be any slower than the Xsara, and that car had a performance edge over us last year." Petter Solberg also had issues with his tyres throughout the rally. After Subaru switched to BF Goodriches from Pirelli following the 2006 season, and with the shortest break between seasons the WRC had seen, the crews had not had enough time to test the new compounds. The Subarus had had their problems with the Pirellis, too. To protect them from breaking up too quickly the drivers had learned how to look after them, but driving that way on the new brand meant that he could not get the BFs up to temperature and ended up running slower. He finished the rally in sixth place. His teammate Atkinson did not have that problem though, and after fighting with Hirvonen in the final half of the rally, finished in fourth place. "It's been a massive battle, and so much fun to be in a battle with these guys again," he said after being congratulated by Hirvonen. Two drivers in non-manufacturer cars, Gardemeister and Kopecký, finished in seventh and eighth place to receive drivers points.

As a consequence of the final positions, Loeb started the season leading in the World Rally Championship for Drivers with ten points. Sordo was second with eight points, Grönholm was in third position with six points. In the World Rally Championship for Manufacturers, Stobart Ford had one point from Henning Solberg's fourteenth-placed position (although Wilson finished the rally quicker, he was not nominated to earn points for the manufacturer). Stohl earned OMV-Kronos Citroën two points. Subaru were in third place with eight points, BP-Ford were two points clear of Subaru in second place, and Citroën Total WRT was first, with eighteen points – ten from Loeb's win and eight from Sordo.

== Statistics ==
Crew names in italics are able to score points for the manufacturer in the World Rally Championship for Manufacturers

=== Entry list ===
List of entrants
Car No	Driver	Co-driver	Car	Entrant	Group / Class	Priority
1	(France) Sébastien Loeb	(Monaco) Daniel Elena	Citroën C4 WRC	Citroën Total WRT	A8	1
2	(Spain) Dani Sordo	(Spain) Marc Martí	Citroën C4 WRC	Citroën Total WRT	A8	1
3	(Finland) Marcus Grönholm	(Finland) Timo Rautiainen	Ford Focus RS WRC '06	BP-Ford WRT	A8	1
4	(Finland) Mikko Hirvonen	(Finland) Jarmo Lehtinen	Ford Focus RS WRC '06	BP-Ford WRT	A8	1
5	(Austria) Manfred Stohl	(Austria) Ilka Minor	Citroën Xsara WRC	OMV-Kronos Citroën WRT	A8	1
7	(Norway) Petter Solberg	(United Kingdom) Phil Mills	Subaru Impreza WRC2006	Subaru WRT	A8	1
8	(Australia) Chris Atkinson	(Australia) Glenn MacNeall	Subaru Impreza WRC2006	Subaru WRT	A8	1
9	(Finland) Jari-Matti Latvala	(Finland) Miikka Anttila	Ford Focus RS WRC '06	Stobart VK M-Sport Ford RT	A8	1
10	(Norway) Henning Solberg	(Norway) Cato Menkerud	Ford Focus RS WRC '06	Stobart VK M-Sport Ford RT	A8	1
16	(United Kingdom) Matthew Wilson	(United Kingdom) Michael Orr	Ford Focus RS WRC '06	Stobart VK M-Sport Ford RT	A8	2
17	(Belgium) François Duval (DNS)	—N/a	Škoda Fabia WRC 06	François Duval	A8	2
18	(Czech Republic) Jan Kopecký	(Czech Republic) Filip Schovanek	Škoda Fabia WRC 06	Jan Kopecký	A8	2
19	(Republic of Ireland) Gareth MacHale	(Republic of Ireland) Paul Nagle	Ford Focus RS WRC '03	Gareth MacHale	A8	2
20	(Republic of Ireland) Eamonn Boland	(United Kingdom) Francis Regan	Ford Focus RS WRC '03	Eamonn Boland	A8	2
21	(France) Jean-Marie Cuoq	(France) David Marty	Peugeot 307 WRC	Jean-Marie Cuoq	A8	2
26	(Finland) Toni Gardemeister	(Finland) Jakke Honkanen	Mitsubishi Lancer WRC 05	MMSP Ltd	A8	2
27	(Spain) Xavier Pons	(Spain) Xavier Amigo	Mitsubishi Lancer WRC 05	MMSP Ltd	A8	2
61	(Switzerland) Philippe Roux	(Switzerland) Eric Jordan	Peugeot 307 WRC	Philippe Roux	A8	—
62	(France) Frederic Romeyer	(France) Marie-Ange Lachand	Peugeot 206 WRC	Frederic Romeyer	A8	—
63	(Hungary) Daniel Holczer	(Hungary) Gábor Magyar	Renault Clio RS	Daniel Holczer	A7	—
64	(France) Arnaud Monnet	Bertrand Chagot	Peugeot 206 RC	Daniel Holczer	A7	—
65	(Monaco) Marc Dessi	(Monaco) Vanessa Dessi	Renault Clio RS	Les Casinos de Monte-Carlo	A7	—
66	(Italy) Flavio Castegnaro	(Italy) Renzo Fraschia	Peugeot 206 RC	Flavio Castegnaro	A7	—
67	(Czech Republic) Martin Prokop	(Czech Republic) Jan Tománek	Citroën C2 S1600	Martin Prokop	A6	—
68	(France) Fabiano Lo Fiego	(France) Hubert Brun	Citroën C2 S1600	Fabiano Lo Fiego	A6	—
69	(Italy) Luca Betti	(Italy) Giovanni Agnese	Renault Clio S1600	Luca Betti	A6	—
70	(France) Marc Amourette	(France) Gwenola Marie	Citroën C2-R2	Marc Amourette	A6	—
71	(France) Alain Pellerey	(France) Eric Domenech	Citroën Saxo Kit Car	Alain Pellerey	A6	—
72	(Italy) Angelo Villa (DNS)	(Italy) Elisa Faravelli	Fiat Punto	Angelo Villa	A6	—
73	(France) Lilian Vialle	(France) Patrice Roissac	Renault Clio S1600	Lilian Vialle	A6	—
74	(Austria) Andreas Aigner	(Germany) Klaus Wicha	Mitsubishi Lancer Evo IX	Andreas Aigner	N4	—
75	(Switzerland) Olivier Burri	(France) Fabrice Gordon	Subaru Impreza WRX STi	Olivier Burri	N4	—
76	(France) Jean-Paul Ayme	(France) Brigitte Ayme	Mitsubishi Lancer Evo IX	Jean-Paul Ayme	N4	—
77	(France) Richard Frau	(France) Serge Legars	Mitsubishi Lancer Evo IX	Richard Frau	N4	—
78	(Spain) Joan Font Guixaro	(Spain) Jordi Barrabes Costa	Subaru Impreza WRX STi	Joan Font Guixaro	N4	—
79	(France) Alain Machard	(France) Alain Constant	Subaru Impreza WRX STi	Alain Machard	N4	—
80	(Poland) Andrzej Mancin	(Poland) Ryszard Ciupka	Mitsubishi Lancer Evo VII	Andrzej Mancin	N4	—
81	(France) Laurent Nicolas	(France) Patrice Mallet	Subaru Impreza WRX STi	Laurent Nicolas	N4	—
82	(France) Frédéric Sauvan	(France) Aymeric Duchemin	Mitsubishi Lancer Evo IX	Frédéric Sauvan	N4	—
83	(France) Jerome Galpin	(France) Eric Bacle	Subaru Impreza WRX STi	Jerome Galpin	N4	—
84	(Italy) Riccardo Errani	(Italy) Stefano Casadio	Mitsubishi Lancer Evo IX	Riccardo Errani	N4	—
85	(France) Luc Dewinter	(France) Nicolas Gilsoul	Mitsubishi Lancer Evo IX	Luc Dewinter	N4	—
86	(Switzerland) Chris Marti	(Germany) Stephane Marti	Mitsubishi Lancer Evo VI	Chris Marti	N4	—
87	(France) Miguel Baudoin	(France) Fredéric Vauclare	Mitsubishi Lancer Evo VII	Miguel Baudoin	N4	—
88	(France) Stephane Vouillon	(France) Alexandre Pasta	Subaru Impreza WRX STi	Stephane Vouillon	N4	—
89	(France) Claude Carret	(France) Jean-Rodolphe Guigonnet	Mitsubishi Lancer Evo IX	Claude Carret	N4	—
90	(France) Pierre Marche	(France) Julien Giroux	Mitsubishi Lancer Evo IX	Pierre Marche	N4	—
91	(France) Jerome Aymard	(France) Sandrine Aymard	Mitsubishi Lancer Evo IX	Jerome Aymard	N4	—
92	(France) Patrick Artru	(France) Cédric Soy	Mitsubishi Lancer Evo VII	Patrick Artru	N4	—

=== Special stages ===
Itinerary of Special Stages
Stage No	Name	Type	Distance in km (mi)	Start time (CET [UTC+1])	Status	Winner	Time (mm:ss)	Avg. speed in km/h (mph)	Rally leader
Leg 1: Thursday, 18 January 2007
1	Saint-Jean-en-Royans – Col de Lachau	Tarmac	28.52 (17.72)	19:16	Completed	(France) Sébastien Loeb	13:58.7	122.42 (76.07)	(France) Sébastien Loeb
2	La Cime du Mas – Gaudissart	Tarmac	17.87 (11.10)	20:06	Completed	(France) Sébastien Loeb	9:31.2	112.63 (69.99)	(France) Sébastien Loeb
	Service Park (Valence)	—N/a		21:34	Completed	—N/a			(France) Sébastien Loeb
	Park Fermé (Valence)	—N/a			Completed	—N/a			(France) Sébastien Loeb
Leg 2: Friday, 19 January 2007
	Service Park (Valence)	—N/a		06:50	Completed	—N/a			(France) Sébastien Loeb
3	Saint-Pierreville – Antraigues 1	Tarmac	46.02 (28.60)	08:19	Completed	(Spain) Dani Sordo	29:43.4	93.26 (57.95)	(France) Sébastien Loeb
	Remote Service Zone (Vals-les-Bains)	—N/a		09:25	Completed	—N/a			(France) Sébastien Loeb
4	Burzet – Lachamp-Raphaël 1	Tarmac	16.48 (10.24)	10:13	Completed	(France) Sébastien Loeb	9:39.3	102.35 (63.60)	(France) Sébastien Loeb
5	Saint-Martial – Le Chambon – Beleac 1	Tarmac	12.81 (7.96)	10:59	Completed	(Spain) Dani Sordo	8:00.7	95.94 (59.61)	(France) Sébastien Loeb
	Service Park (Valence)	—N/a		13:28	Completed	—N/a			(France) Sébastien Loeb
6	Saint-Pierreville – Antraigues 2	Tarmac	46.02 (28.60)	15:17	Completed	(France) Sébastien Loeb	28:29.7	97.28 (60.45)	(France) Sébastien Loeb
	Remote Service Zone (Vals-les-Bains)	—N/a		16:23	Completed	—N/a			(France) Sébastien Loeb
7	Burzet – Lachamp-Raphaël 2	Tarmac	16.48 (10.24)	17:11	Completed	(Spain) Dani Sordo	9:43.2	101.67 (63.17)	(France) Sébastien Loeb
8	Saint-Martial – Le Chambon – Beleac 2	Tarmac	12.81 (7.96)	17:57	Completed	(France) Sébastien Loeb	8:16.4	92.9 (57.7)	(France) Sébastien Loeb
	Service Park (Valence)	—N/a		19:56	Completed	—N/a			(France) Sébastien Loeb
	Park Fermé (Valence)	—N/a			Completed	—N/a			(France) Sébastien Loeb
Leg 3: Saturday and Sunday, 20–21 January 2007
	Service Park (Valence)	—N/a		06:00	Completed	—N/a			(France) Sébastien Loeb
9	Labatie-d'Andaure – Lalouvesc 1	Tarmac	19.67 (12.22)	07:31	Completed	(France) Sébastien Loeb	10:47.2	109.41 (67.98)	(France) Sébastien Loeb
10	Saint-Bonnet 1	Tarmac	25.93 (16.11)	08:13	Completed	(Australia) Chris Atkinson	12:42.7	122.39 (76.05)	(France) Sébastien Loeb
11	Saint-Bonnet – Saint-Barthélemy-Grozon 1	Tarmac	18.76 (11.66)	09:38	Completed	(Finland) Mikko Hirvonen	11:46.9	95.54 (59.37)	(France) Sébastien Loeb
	Service Park (Valence)	—N/a		11:12	Completed	—N/a			(France) Sébastien Loeb
12	Labatie-d'Andaure – Lalouvesc 2	Tarmac	19.67 (12.22)	13:00	Completed	(Finland) Mikko Hirvonen	10:45.1	109.77 (68.21)	(France) Sébastien Loeb
13	Saint-Bonnet 2	Tarmac	25.93 (16.11)	13:45	Completed	(Australia) Chris Atkinson	12:32.4	124.07 (77.09)	(France) Sébastien Loeb
14	Saint-Bonnet – Saint-Barthélemy-Grozon 2	Tarmac	18.76 (11.66)	15:10	Completed	(Finland) Mikko Hirvonen	11:30.5	97.81 (60.78)	(France) Sébastien Loeb
	Service Park (Valence)	—N/a		16:29	Completed	—N/a			(France) Sébastien Loeb
15	Circuit de Monaco	Tarmac	2.8 (1.7)	09:00	Completed	(Australia) Chris Atkinson	1:49.9	91.39 (56.79)	(France) Sébastien Loeb

== Classifications ==
Final classification after 15 Special Stages
Position	Car Number	Driver	Co-driver	Car	Entrant	Group / Class	Stage time (h:mm:ss)	Penalty (mm:ss)	Total time (h:mm:ss)	Diff. (previous)	Diff. (leader)	Group position	Class position	WRC Points
1	1	(France) Sébastien Loeb	(Monaco) Daniel Elena	Citroën C4 WRC	Citroën Total WRT	A8	3:10:27.4	—	3:10:27.4	—	—	1	1	10
2	2	(Spain) Dani Sordo	(Spain) Marc Martí	Citroën C4 WRC	Citroën Total WRT	A8	3:11:05.6	—	3:11:05.6	+38.2	+38.2	2	2	8
3	3	(Finland) Marcus Grönholm	(Finland) Timo Rautiainen	Ford Focus RS WRC '06	BP-Ford WRT	A8	3:11:05.6	—	3:11:50.2	+44.6	+1:22.8	3	3	6
4	8	(Australia) Chris Atkinson	(Australia) Glenn MacNeall	Subaru Impreza WRC2006	Subaru WRT	A8	3:12:55.5	—	3:12:55.5	+1:05.3	+2:28.1	4	4	5
5	4	(Finland) Mikko Hirvonen	(Finland) Jarmo Lehtinen	Ford Focus RS WRC '06	BP-Ford WRT	A8	3:12:55.7	—	3:12:55.7	+0.2	+2:28.3	5	5	4
6	7	(Norway) Petter Solberg	(United Kingdom) Phil Mills	Subaru Impreza WRC2006	Subaru WRT	A8	3:13:39.4	—	3:13:39.4	+43.7	+3:12.0	6	6	3
7	26	(Finland) Toni Gardemeister	(Finland) Jakke Honkanen	Mitsubishi Lancer Evo IX	MMSP Ltd	A8	3:14:05.5	—	3:14:05.5	+26.1	+3:38.1	7	7	2
8	18	(Czech Republic) Jan Kopecký	(Czech Republic) Filip Schovánek	Škoda Fabia WRC	Jan Kopecký	A8	3:15:06.8	—	3:15:06.8	+1:01.3	+4:39.4	8	8	1
9	21	(France) Jean-Marie Cuoq	(France) David Marty	Peugeot 307 WRC	Jean-Marie Cuoq	A8	3:16:27.1	—	3:16:27.1	+1:20.3	+5:59.7	9	9	—
10	5	(Austria) Manfred Stohl	(Austria) Ilka Minor	Citroën Xsara WRC	OMV-Kronos Citroën WRT	A8	3:16:27.1	—	3:16:27.1	+1:20.3	+5:59.7	10	10	—
11	19	(Republic of Ireland) Gareth MacHale	(Republic of Ireland) Paul Nagle	Ford Focus RS WRC '03	Gareth MacHale	A8	3:21:38.0	—	3:21:38.0	+4:33.3	+11:10.6	11	11	—
12	16	(United Kingdom) Matthew Wilson	(United Kingdom) Michael Orr	Ford Focus RS WRC '06	Stobart VK M-Sport Ford RT	A8	3:23:38.4	—	3:23:38.4	+2:00.4	+13:11.0	12	12	—
13	62	(France) Frederic Romeyer	(France) Marie-Ange Lachand	Peugeot 206 WRC	Frederic Romeyer	A8	3:24:09.3	00:10	3:24:19.3	+40.9	+13:51.9	13	13	—
14	10	(Norway) Henning Solberg	(Norway) Cato Menkerud	Ford Focus RS WRC '06	Stobart VK M-Sport Ford RT	A8	3:25:11.9	—	3:25:11.9	+52.6	+14:44.5	14	14	—
15	20	(Republic of Ireland) Eamonn Boland	(United Kingdom) Francis Regan	Ford Focus RS WRC '03	Eamonn Boland	A8	3:31:39.1	—	3:31:39.1	+6:27.2	+21:11.7	15	15	—
16	61	(Switzerland) Philippe Roux	(Switzerland) Eric Jordan	Peugeot 307 WRC	Philippe Roux	A8	3:32:47.8	—	3:32:47.8	+1:08.7	+22:20.4	16	16	—
17	75	(Switzerland) Olivier Burri	(France) Fabrice Gordon	Subaru Impreza WRX STi	Olivier Burri	N4	3:32:56.6	—	3:32:56.6	+8.8	+22:29.2	1	1	—
18	67	(Czech Republic) Martin Prokop	(Czech Republic) Jan Tománek	Citroën C2 S1600	Martin Prokop	A6	3:34:58.1	00:10	3:35:08.1	+2:11.5	+24:40.7	17	1	—
25	67	(Spain) Xavier Pons	(Spain) Xavier Amigo	Mitsubishi Lancer Evo IX	MMSP Ltd	A8	3:45:39.9	—	3:45:39.9	+1:26.7	+35:12.5	20	17	—

Leading retirements
Stage	Car Number	Driver	Co-driver	Car	Entrant	Group / Class	Cause
8	74	(Austria) Andreas Aigner	(Germany) Klaus Wicha	Mitsubishi Lancer Evo IX	Andreas Aigner	N4	Transmission
15	14	(Finland) Jari-Matti Latvala	(Finland) Miikka Anttila	Ford Focus RS WRC '06	Stobart VK M-Sport Ford RT	A8	Roll cage damage

== Championship standings after the event ==
World Rally Championship for Drivers standings
Position	Driver	Points
1	(France) Sébastien Loeb	10
2	(Spain) Dani Sordo	8
3	(Finland) Marcus Grönholm	6
4	(Australia) Chris Atkinson	5
5	(Finland) Mikko Hirvonen	4
6	(Norway) Petter Solberg	3
7	(Finland) Toni Gardemeister	2
8	(Czech Republic) Jan Kopecký	1

World Rally Championship for Manufacturers standings
Position	Manufacturer	Points
1	(France) Citroën Total World Rally Team	18
2	(United Kingdom) BP-Ford World Rally Team	10
3	(United Kingdom) Subaru World Rally Team	8
4	(Belgium) OMV-Kronos Citroën World Rally Team	2
5	(United Kingdom) Stobart VK M-Sport Ford Rally Team	1
