= 2008 Swedish Rally =

Car rally

2008 Swedish Rally 57th Uddeholm Swedish Rally
Round 2 of the 2008 World Rally Championship
← Previous event	Next event →
- Host country: Sweden
- Rally base: Karlstad, Sweden
- Dates run: February 7 – 10 2008
- Stages: 20 (340.24 km; 211.42 miles)
- Stage surface: Snow/Ice-covered gravel
- Overall distance: 1,440.08 km (894.82 miles)

Statistics
- Crews: 61 at start, 49 at finish

Overall results
- Overall winner: (Finland) Jari-Matti Latvala (United Kingdom) BP-Ford World Rally Team

The 2008 Swedish Rally, officially 57th Uddeholm Swedish Rally, was the second round of the 2008 World Rally Championship season. It was the season's first and only event held on snow- and ice-covered gravel roads. The rally took place during February 7–10, beginning with the Super Special Stage placed in the rally's base, Karlstad. The rally was also the first round of the Production Car World Rally Championship this season.

Even though it snowed before the rally, eliminating the threat of calling the event off, the mild temperatures caused cancellation of stages 12 and 18, shortening the overall competitive length.

The rally was won by BP Ford World Rally Team's Jari-Matti Latvala; the first of his championship career. Latvala's teammate and compatriot Mikko Hirvonen was second and Stobart VK M-Sport Ford's Gigi Galli completed an all-Ford podium. Subaru World Rally Team's Petter Solberg was fourth, followed by Andreas Mikkelsen, Dani Sordo, Toni Gardemeister, Juho Hänninen, Mads Østberg and Jari Ketomaa. Fifth-placed Matthew Wilson ran into technical problems with throttle on the penultimate stage and had to retire. Sébastien Loeb crashed out and rolled his car while running third, then retired again, after restarting under SupeRally and winning two stages, because of the damaged engine. Henning Solberg inherited the third place, but later suffered a puncture causing him to slip further down and then crashed while running fourth and was forced to retire for the second day; after rejoining the fight under SupeRally format Norwegian was the fastest driver on day three, winning all the remaining stages.

With his debut win, the 22-year old Latvala became the then-youngest winner in the history of the WRC, breaking Henri Toivonen's record from the 1980 RAC Rally; his own record would stand until the 2021 Rally Estonia where it would be broken by the 20-year-old Kalle Rovanperä.

== Results ==
Pos.	Driver	Co-driver	Car	Time	Difference	Points
WRC
1.	(Finland) Jari-Matti Latvala	(Finland) Miikka Anttila	Ford Focus RS WRC 07	2:46:41.2		10
2.	(Finland) Mikko Hirvonen	(Finland) Jarmo Lehtinen	Ford Focus RS WRC 07	2:47:39.5	+58.3	8
3.	(Italy) Gigi Galli	(Italy) Giovanni Bernacchini	Ford Focus RS WRC 07	2:49:04.4	2:23.2	6
4.	(Norway) Petter Solberg	(Wales) Phil Mills	Subaru Impreza WRC2007	2:49:40.6	2:59.4	5
5.	(Norway) Andreas Mikkelsen	(Norway) Ola Floene	Ford Focus RS WRC 06	2:52:27.2	5:46.0	4
6.	(Spain) Dani Sordo	(Spain) Marc Marti	Citroën C4 WRC	2:53:54.3 ^{[1]}	7:13.1	3
7.	(Finland) Toni Gardemeister	(Finland) Tomi Tuominen	Suzuki SX4 WRC	2:57:16.5	10:35.3	2
8.	(Finland) Juho Hänninen	(Finland) Mikko Markkula	Mitsubishi Lancer Evolution IX	2:59:08.7	12:27.5	1
			^{[1]} — Including 5 minute penalty for replacing the damaged engine after malfunction during 2008 Monte Carlo Rally.			
PCWRC
1. (8.)	(Finland) Juho Hänninen	(Finland) Mikko Markkula	Mitsubishi Lancer Evolution IX	2:59:08.7		10
2. (10.)	(Finland) Jari Ketomaa	(Finland) Miika Teiskonen	Subaru Impreza WRX STi N14	3:00:31.9	1:23.2	8
3. (11.)	(Sweden) Patrik Sandell	(Sweden) Emil Axelsson	Peugeot 207 S2000	3:01:00.5	1:51.8	6
4. (12.)	(Czech Republic) Martin Prokop	(Czech Republic) Jan Tománek	Mitsubishi Lancer Evolution IX	3:01:11.7	2:03.0	5
5. (14.)	(Germany) Uwe Nittel	(Germany) Detlef Ruf	Mitsubishi Lancer Evolution IX	3:03:04.0	3:55.3	4
6. (15.)	(Japan) Toshihiro Arai	(Australia) Glenn MacNeall	Subaru Impreza WRX STi	3:03:31.6	4:22.9	3
7. (17.)	(Portugal) Armindo Araujo	(Portugal) Miguel Ramalho	Mitsubishi Lancer Evolution IX	3:05:13.9	6:05.2	2
8. (19.)	(Portugal) Bernardo Sousa	(Portugal) Carlos Magalhães	Mitsubishi Lancer Evolution IX	3:07:07.3	7:58.6	1

== Special stages ==
All dates and times are CET (UTC+1).

Day	Stage	Time	Name	Length	Winner	Time	Avg. spd.	Rally leader
1 (7 FEB)	SS1	20:04	SSS Karlstad 1	1.90 km	(Norway) P. Solberg	1:28.9	76.5 km/h	(Norway) P. Solberg
2 (8 FEB)	SS2	09:34	Stensjön 1	15.50 km	(Finland) J. Latvala	7:24.0	125.7 km/h	(Finland) J. Latvala
2 (8 FEB)	SS3	10:44	Bjälverud 1	21.58 km	(Finland) J. Latvala	10:33.7	122.5 km/h	(Finland) J. Latvala
2 (8 FEB)	SS4	11:23	Mangen 1	22.09 km	(Finland) J. Latvala	12:20.7	107.4 km/h	(Finland) J. Latvala
2 (8 FEB)	SS5	13:25	Stensjön 2	15.50 km	(Finland) J. Latvala	7:22.3	126.2 km/h	(Finland) J. Latvala
2 (8 FEB)	SS6	14:35	Bjälverud 2	21.58 km	(Finland) J. Latvala	10:32.4	122.8 km/h	(Finland) J. Latvala
2 (8 FEB)	SS7	15:14	Mangen 2	22.09 km	(Finland) J. Latvala	12:21.2	107.3 km/h	(Finland) J. Latvala
2 (8 FEB)	SS8	18:00	SSS Karlstad 2	1.90 km	(Italy) G. Galli	1:28.2	77.6 km/h	(Finland) J. Latvala
3 (9 FEB)	SS9	08:25	Horssjön 1	14.89 km	(France) S. Loeb	9:18.1	96.0 km/h	(Finland) J. Latvala
3 (9 FEB)	SS10	09:38	Hagfors 1	20.92 km	(Spain) D. Sordo	11:45.8	106.7 km/h	(Finland) J. Latvala
3 (9 FEB)	SS11	10:41	Vargåsen 1	24.63 km	(France) S. Loeb	13:49.1	106.9 km/h	(Finland) J. Latvala
3 (9 FEB)	SS12	13:04	Horssjön 2	14.89 km	Cancelled			(Finland) J. Latvala
3 (9 FEB)	SS13	14:17	Hagfors 2	20.92 km	(Spain) D. Sordo	11:30.1	109.1 km/h	(Finland) J. Latvala
3 (9 FEB)	SS14	15:20	Vargåsen 2	24.63 km	(Finland) M. Hirvonen	13:32.5	109.1 km/h	(Finland) J. Latvala
4 (10 FEB)	SS15	08:08	Ullen 1	16.25 km	(Norway) H. Solberg	8:21.7	116.6 km/h	(Finland) J. Latvala
4 (10 FEB)	SS16	09:13	Lesjöfors 1	10.49 km	(Norway) H. Solberg	5:54.5	106.5 km/h	(Finland) J. Latvala
4 (10 FEB)	SS17	09:45	Rämmen 1	21.87 km	(Norway) H. Solberg	11:14.4	116.7 km/h	(Finland) J. Latvala
4 (10 FEB)	SS18	11:21	Ullen 2	16.25 km	Cancelled			(Finland) J. Latvala
4 (10 FEB)	SS19	12:26	Lesjöfors 2	10.49 km	(Norway) H. Solberg	5:43.8	109.7 km/h	(Finland) J. Latvala
4 (10 FEB)	SS20	12:58	Rämmen 2	21.87 km	(Norway) H. Solberg	11:07.1	118.0 km/h	(Finland) J. Latvala

== Championship standings after the event ==
=== Drivers' championship ===
Pos	Driver	MON (Monaco)	SWE (Sweden)	MEX (Mexico)	ARG (Argentina)	JOR (Jordan)	ITA (Italy)	GRC (Greece)	TUR (Turkey)	FIN (Finland)	GER (Germany)	NZL (New Zealand)	ESP (Spain)	FRA (France)	JPN (Japan)	GBR (United Kingdom)	Pts
1	(Finland) Mikko Hirvonen	2	2														16
2	(Finland) Jari-Matti Latvala	12	1														10
2	(France) Sébastien Loeb	1	Ret.														10
4	(Italy) Gigi Galli	6	3														9
4	(Norway) Petter Solberg	5	4														9
6	(Australia) Chris Atkinson	3	21														6
7	(Belgium) François Duval	4															5
8	(Norway) Andreas Mikkelsen		5														4
9	(Spain) Dani Sordo	11	6														3
10	(France) Jean-Marie Cuoq	7															2
10	(Finland) Toni Gardemeister	Ret.	7														2
12	(Sweden) Per-Gunnar Andersson	8	Ret.														1
12	(Finland) Juho Hänninen		8														1
Pos	Driver	MON (Monaco)	SWE (Sweden)	MEX (Mexico)	ARG (Argentina)	JOR (Jordan)	ITA (Italy)	GRC (Greece)	TUR (Turkey)	FIN (Finland)	GER (Germany)	NZL (New Zealand)	ESP (Spain)	FRA (France)	JPN (Japan)	GBR (United Kingdom)	Pts

Key
Colour	Result
Gold	Winner
Silver	2nd place
Bronze	3rd place
Green	Points finish
Blue	Non-points finish
Blue	Non-classified finish (NC)
Purple	Did not finish (Ret)
Black	Excluded (EX)
Black	Disqualified (DSQ)
White	Did not start (DNS)
White	Cancelled (C)
Blank	Withdrew entry from the event (WD)

=== Manufacturers' championship ===
Rank	Driver	Event															Total points
Rank	Driver	MON (Monaco)	SWE (Sweden)	MEX (Mexico)	ARG (Argentina)	JOR (Jordan)	ITA (Italy)	GRC (Greece)	TUR (Turkey)	FIN (Finland)	GER (Germany)	NZL (New Zealand)	ESP (Spain)	FRA (France)	JPN (Japan)	GBR (United Kingdom)	Total points
1	(United Kingdom) BP Ford World Rally Team	8	18	-	-	-	-	-	-	-	-	-	-	-	-	-	26
2	(United Kingdom) Stobart M-Sport Ford Rally Team	8	8	-	-	-	-	-	-	-	-	-	-	-	-	-	16
2	(Japan) Subaru World Rally Team	10	6	-	-	-	-	-	-	-	-	-	-	-	-	-	16
4	(France) Citroën Total World Rally Team	11	4	-	-	-	-	-	-	-	-	-	-	-	-	-	15
5	(Japan) Suzuki World Rally Team	2	3	-	-	-	-	-	-	-	-	-	-	-	-	-	5
6	(Argentina) Munchi's Ford World Rally Team			-	-	-	-	-	-	-	-	-	-	-	-	-	0

=== Production championship ===
Points table:

Pos	Driver	SWE (Sweden)	ARG (Argentina)	GRC (Greece)	TUR (Turkey)	FIN (Finland)	NZL (New Zealand)	JPN (Japan)	GBR (United Kingdom)	Pts
1	(Finland) Juho Hänninen	1								10
2	(Finland) Jari Ketomaa	2								8
3	(Sweden) Patrik Sandell	3								6
4	(Czech Republic) Martin Prokop	4								5
5	(Germany) Uwe Nittel	5								4
6	(Japan) Toshihiro Arai	6								3
7	(Portugal) Armindo Araújo	7								2
8	(Portugal) Bernardo Sousa	8								1
Pos	Driver	SWE (Sweden)	ARG (Argentina)	GRC (Greece)	TUR (Turkey)	FIN (Finland)	NZL (New Zealand)	JPN (Japan)	GBR (United Kingdom)	Pts
