= Matthew Wilson (rally driver) =

British rally driver (born 1987)

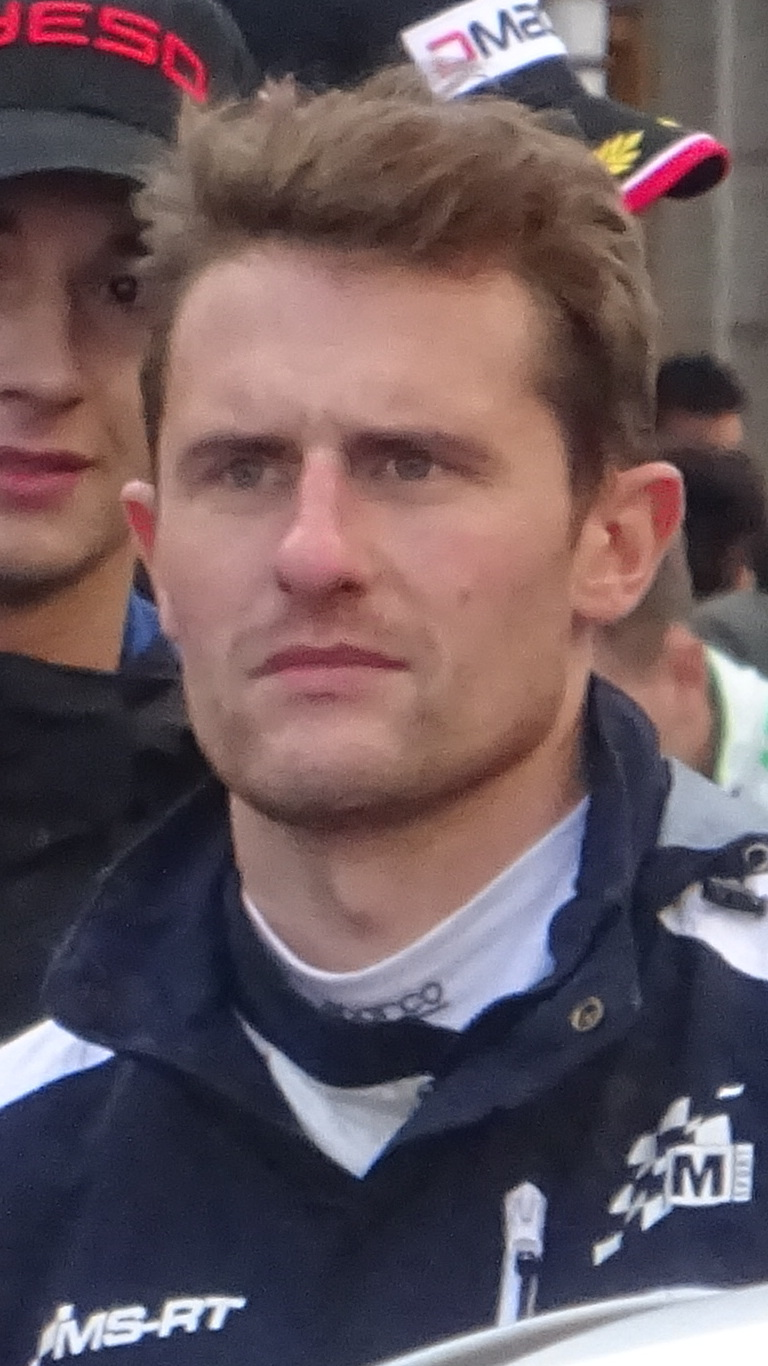
- Matthew Wilson at 2017 Wales Rally GB

Personal information
- Nationality: (United Kingdom) British
- Born: 29 January 1987 (age 39)

World Rally Championship record
- Years active: 2004–2014, 2017
- Co-driver: (United Kingdom) Scott Martin (United Kingdom) Michael Orr (Italy) Giovanni Bernacchini (United Kingdom) Stuart Loudon
- Teams: Stobart Ford
- Rallies: 92
- Championships: 0
- Rally wins: 0
- Podiums: 0
- Stage wins: 3
- Total points: 196
- First rally: 2004 Wales Rally GB
- Last rally: 2017 Wales Rally GB

Matthew James Wilson (born 29 January 1987) is a British rally driver from Cockermouth in Cumbria. He is the son of M-Sport boss and former World Rally Championship driver Malcolm Wilson. Wilson competed in the WRC for the Stobart M-Sport Ford team. He achieved his best result at the 2007 Rally Japan, finishing in fourth place.

== Career ==
=== Early ===
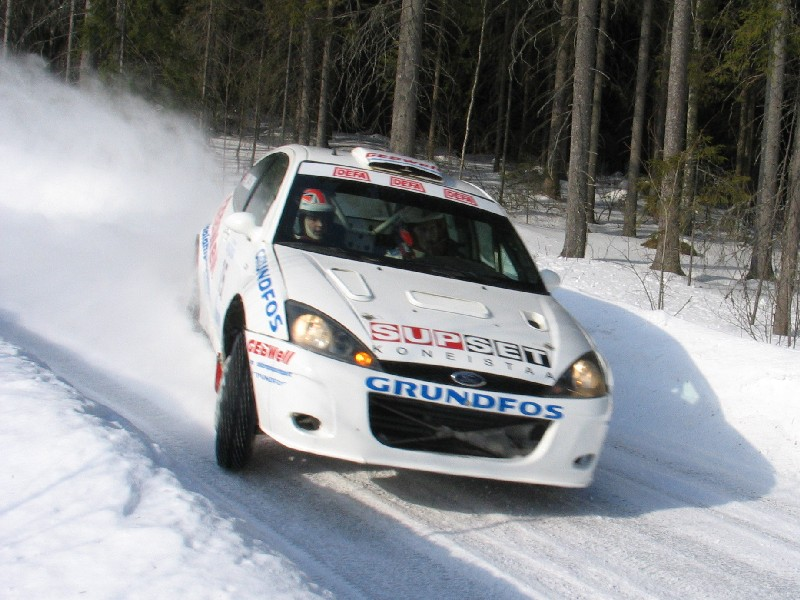
Wilson driving a Ford Focus RS WRC 02 in the Finnish Rally Championship in 2005.

Wilson was initially a brief competitor in single seaters, winning 17 out of 22 races to become T Cars Champion in 2002, before graduating to the Formula Renault UK Championship in 2003, finishing 18th overall for Manor Motorsport. Wilson competed in his first rally, the 2003 Malcolm Wilson Rally, as co-driver to his father, and together they won the event. His first WRC event was the Wales Rally GB in 2004, in which he finished in 13th place overall.

Wilson was one of only six driver and co-drivers selected for the Motor Sports Association British Rally Elite training scheme designed for young British drivers in 2005, and became the youngest ever winner of a British Rally Championship round in the same year when he won the Trackrod Rally aged 18 years, eight months and five days.

However, in April 2005, on the Rally of Wales which is part of the British Rally Championships, Wilson slid off the road on a sixth-gear corner whilst leading the event. He broke his right wrist and left forearm, as well as damaging his right knee. His co-driver, Scott Martin, also broke his left leg in the accident.

When Wilson returned to rallying four months later, he finished second overall on the Gleanor Speyside Stages Rally. Despite months out of action due to the injury, he still finished seventh overall in the 2005 British Rally Championship driving for Eddie Stobart Motorsport, scoring 38 points. Other events in 2005 included winning the Malcolm Wilson Rally, the McRae Stages Rally (a round of the Scottish Rally Championship) and the inaugural Rally Ireland, where he competed with current co-driver Michael Orr for the first time. Wilson also competed in the Finnish Rally Championship, recording his best result at the Vaakuna Rally where he drove his Ford Focus RS WRC 01 to 13th place overall.

=== Stobart Ford (2006–2011) ===
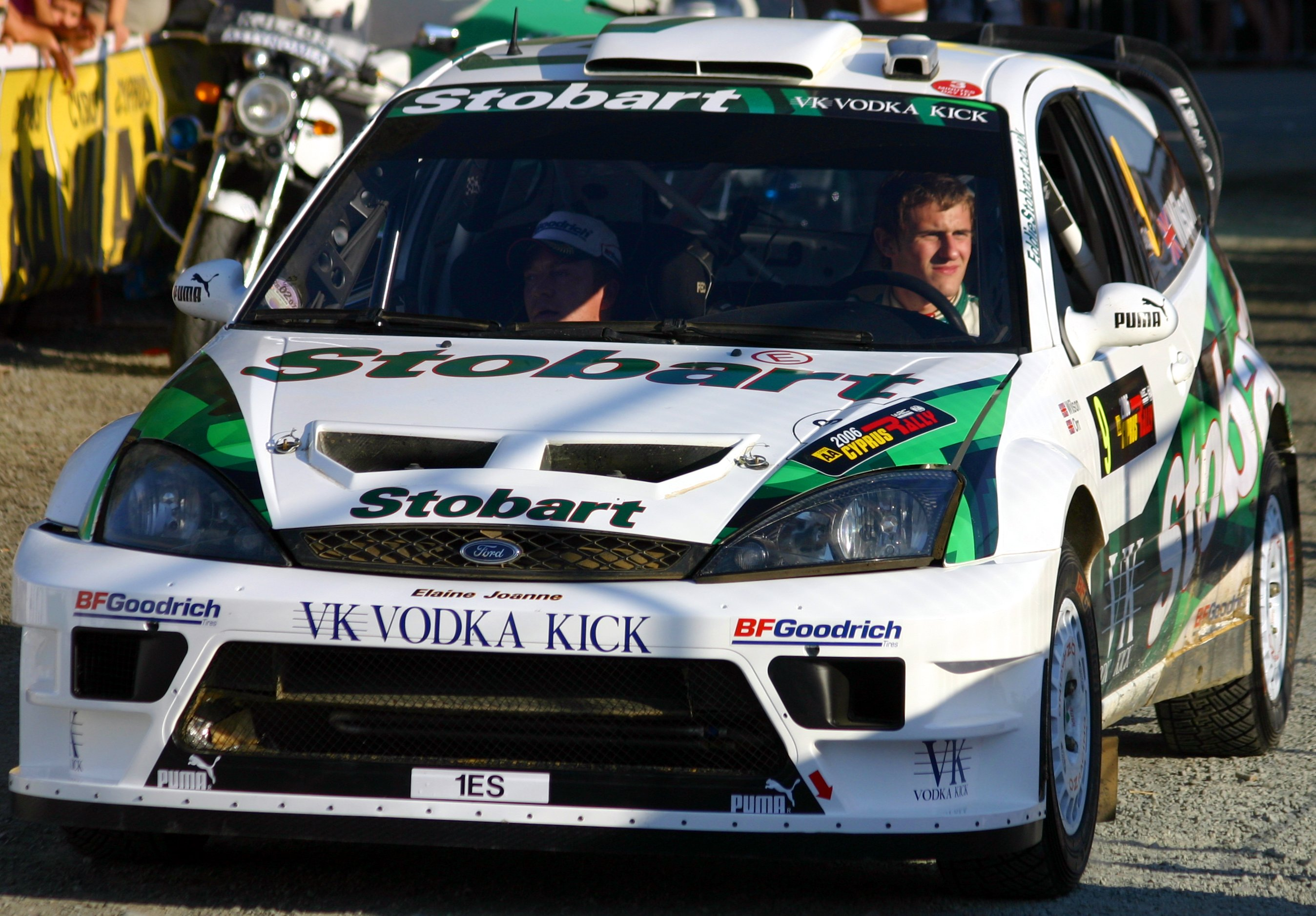
Wilson at the 2006 Cyprus Rally.

2006 was Wilson's first full season in the WRC, as a driver for the Stobart VK M-Sport Ford team. He competed in all 16 rallies, and became the youngest ever world rally driver to win a stage (the Cordoba Stadium superspecial stage on Rally Argentina), and score championship points – when he finished eighth overall on that event. This record was later broken by Andreas Mikkelsen. He finished 28th in the season's standings with one point, but was classified as a finisher in every event, an achievement no other driver managed in 2006.

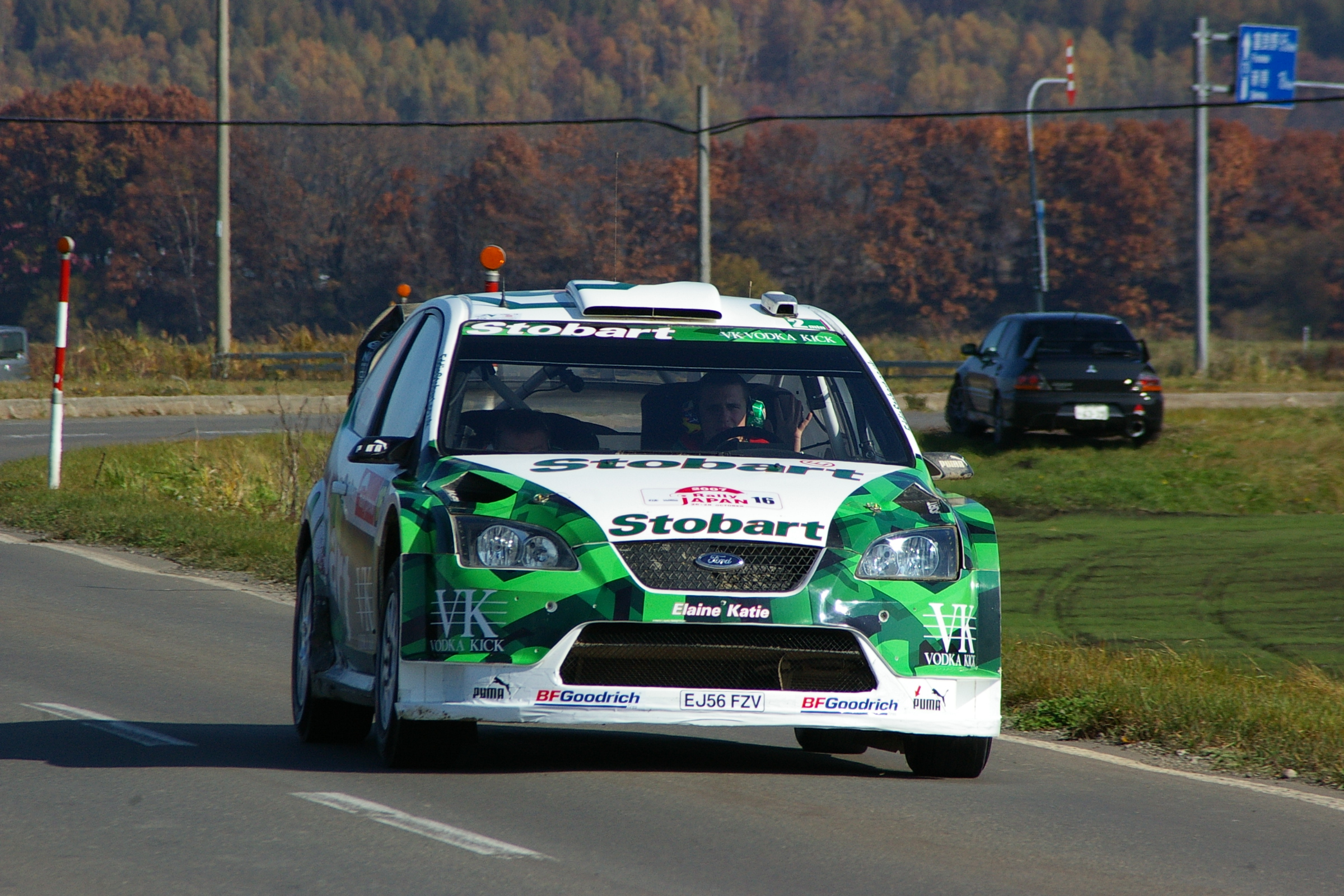
Wilson driving on a road section during the 2007 Rally Japan.

It is well known in rallying that Malcolm Wilson had a five-year plan for Matthew, starting in 2006 and running right through until 2010. 2006 was intended as a 'learning' year, and Matthew was told to finish every rally, taking points as a bonus. In 2007, Jari-Matti Latvala and Henning Solberg were nominated for Stobart's manufacturer points, taking some pressure off Wilson and co-driver Orr. Wilson finished eleventh in the drivers' world championship with eleven points. His best result was fourth at the 2007 Rally Japan.

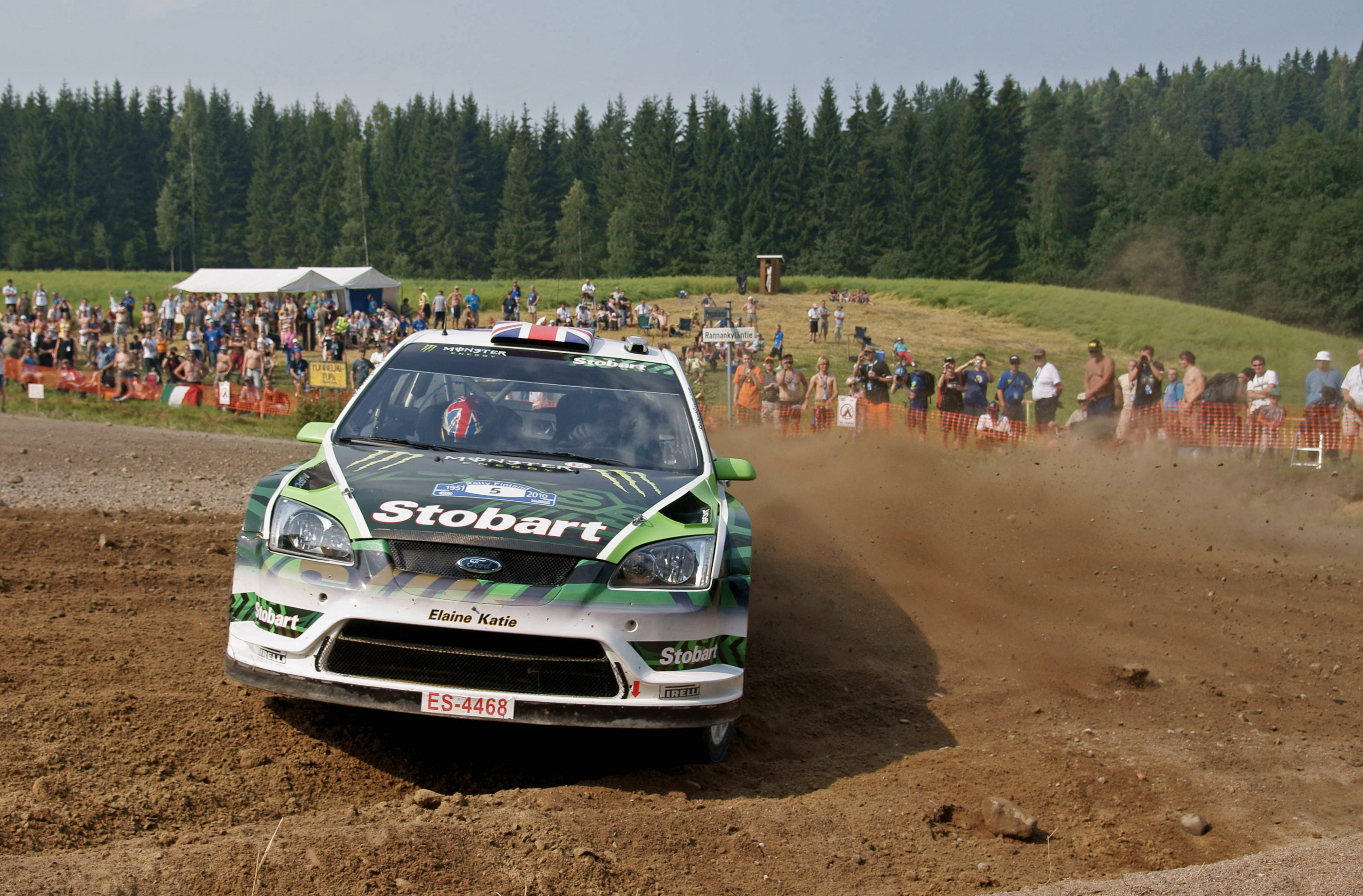
Wilson during the 2010 Rally Finland.

The 2008 season began with an outing Wilson referred to as "moderate" – he finished tenth in Monte Carlo, scoring no points in drivers' nor manufacturers championship. It was his best result here so far; furthermore he had to adjust to new car, tyres and new-old co-driver, Scott Martin. In Sweden, Wilson was aiming for a top-ten finish but even though his pace was good enough to achieve that, mechanical problems with the throttle forced him to retire from fifth place less than 30 km before the finish. Wilson scored his first points of the season in México with a sixth-place finish.

In September 2008, Wilson took part in the Colin McRae Forest Stages Rally, a round of the Scottish Rally Championship centred in Perth, Scotland. He was one of a number of WRC celebrity drivers to take part in the event in memory of McRae, who died in 2007. He went on to win the event comfortably in a 2005-spec Focus RS WRC.

=== Go Fast Energy World Rally Team (2012) ===
Wilson competed for privateer team Go Fast Energy World Rally Team driving a Ford Fiesta RS WRC along with team-mate Henning Solberg for the 2012 season.

Wilson finished 11th in the season opener at Monte Carlo, 18 minutes off the winning time. Following this, he suffered a broken ankle during training; this forced him to miss the following rounds in Sweden, Mexico and Portugal, but he spoke of returning for either Argentina or Greece. However, as of the Rally of Finland, neither Wilson nor the team have appeared.

=== Wales Rally GB Return (2012) ===
Wilson gained funding from several Cumbrian firms which enabled him to enter the 2012 Wales Rally GB. Sporting a new purple and white livery in his familiar M-Sport Ford Fiesta RS WRC, Wilson consistently ran in 9th place throughout the rally but found himself promoted to 8th place following an incident for Ott Tanak ahead. Wilson finished 6 minutes off the pace of winner Jari-Matti Latvala (also in a Fiesta RS WRC). The result enabled Wilson to bank his first championship points (4) of 2012.

Following the event, Wilson hoped to gather enough funding for another entry for the season finale in Spain.

== Career results ==
=== WRC results ===
Year	Entrant	Car	1	2	3	4	5	6	7	8	9	10	11	12	13	14	15	16	WDC	Points
2004	M-Sport	Ford Focus RS WRC 02	MON	SWE	MEX	NZL	CYP	GRE	TUR	ARG	FIN	GER	JPN	GBR; 13	ITA	FRA	ESP	AUS	NC	0
2005	Stobart	Ford Focus RS WRC	MON	SWE	MEX	NZL	ITA	CYP	TUR	GRE	ARG	FIN	GER	GBR; 15	JPN	FRA	ESP	AUS	NC	0
2006	Stobart VK M-Sport	Ford Focus RS WRC 04	MON; 15	SWE; 14	MEX; 16	ESP; 15	FRA; 16	ARG; 8	ITA; 34	GRE; 10	GER; 12	FIN; 10		CYP; 10	TUR; 12				28th	1
2006	Stobart VK M-Sport	Ford Focus RS WRC 06											JPN; 40			AUS; 27	NZL; 13	GBR; 12	28th	1
2007	Stobart VK M-Sport	Ford Focus RS WRC 06	MON; 12	SWE; Ret	NOR; 26	MEX; 8	POR; 12	ARG; 30	ITA; 12	GRE; 10	FIN; 10	GER; 9	NZL; 10	ESP; 11	FRA; Ret	JPN; 4	IRE; 7	GBR; 6	11th	11
2008	Stobart VK M-Sport	Ford Focus RS WRC 07	MON; 10	SWE; Ret	MEX; 6	ARG; Ret	JOR; 5	ITA; 12	GRE; 6	TUR; 7	FIN; 9	GER; 12	NZL; 17	ESP; 9	FRA; 8	JPN; 7	GBR; 9		10th	15
2009	Stobart VK M-Sport	Ford Focus RS WRC 08	IRE; 7	NOR; 7	CYP; 5	POR; Ret	ARG; 5	ITA; 6	GRE; 13	POL; 5	FIN; 8	AUS; 6	ESP; 7	GBR; 6					7th	28
2010	Stobart VK M-Sport	Ford Focus RS WRC 08	SWE; 7	MEX; 16	JOR; 5	TUR; 7	NZL; 6	POR; 6	BUL; 9	FIN; 6	GER; 6	JPN; 22	FRA; 8	ESP; 6	GBR; 7				7th	74
2011	Stobart M-Sport	Ford Fiesta RS WRC	SWE; 9	MEX; Ret	POR; 5	JOR; 5	ITA; 9	ARG; 8	GRE; 6	FIN; 8	GER; 11	AUS; 4	FRA; 10	ESP; Ret	GBR; 5				7th	63
2012	Go Fast Energy	Ford Fiesta RS WRC	MON; 11	SWE	MEX	POR	ARG	GRE	NZL	FIN	GER								25th	4
2012	M-Sport Ford	Ford Fiesta RS WRC										GBR; 8	FRA	ITA	ESP				25th	4
2013	Qatar	Ford Fiesta RS WRC	MON	SWE; 27	MEX	POR	ARG	GRE	ITA	FIN	GER	AUS	FRA	ESP	GBR				NC	0
2014	Yazeed Racing	Ford Fiesta RRC	MON	SWE	MEX	POR	ARG	ITA	POL	FIN	GER	AUS	FRA	ESP	GBR; 14				NC	0
2017	C-Rally	Ford Fiesta R5	MON	SWE	MEX	FRA	ARG	POR	ITA	POL	FIN	GER	ESP	GBR; 39	AUS				NC	0

=== WRC-2 results ===
Year	Entrant	Car	1	2	3	4	5	6	7	8	9	10	11	12	13	WRC 2	Points
2014	Yazeed Racing	Ford Fiesta RRC	MON	SWE	MEX	POR	ARG	ITA	POL	FIN	GER	AUS	FRA	ESP	GBR; 3	24th	15
2017	C-Rally	Ford Fiesta R5	MON	SWE	MEX	FRA	ARG	POR	ITA	POL	FIN	GER	ESP	GBR; 17	AUS	NC	0
