= 2008 Monte Carlo Rally =

2008 Monte Carlo Rally 76ème Rallye Automobile de Monte-Carlo
Round 1 of the 2008 World Rally Championship
Next event →
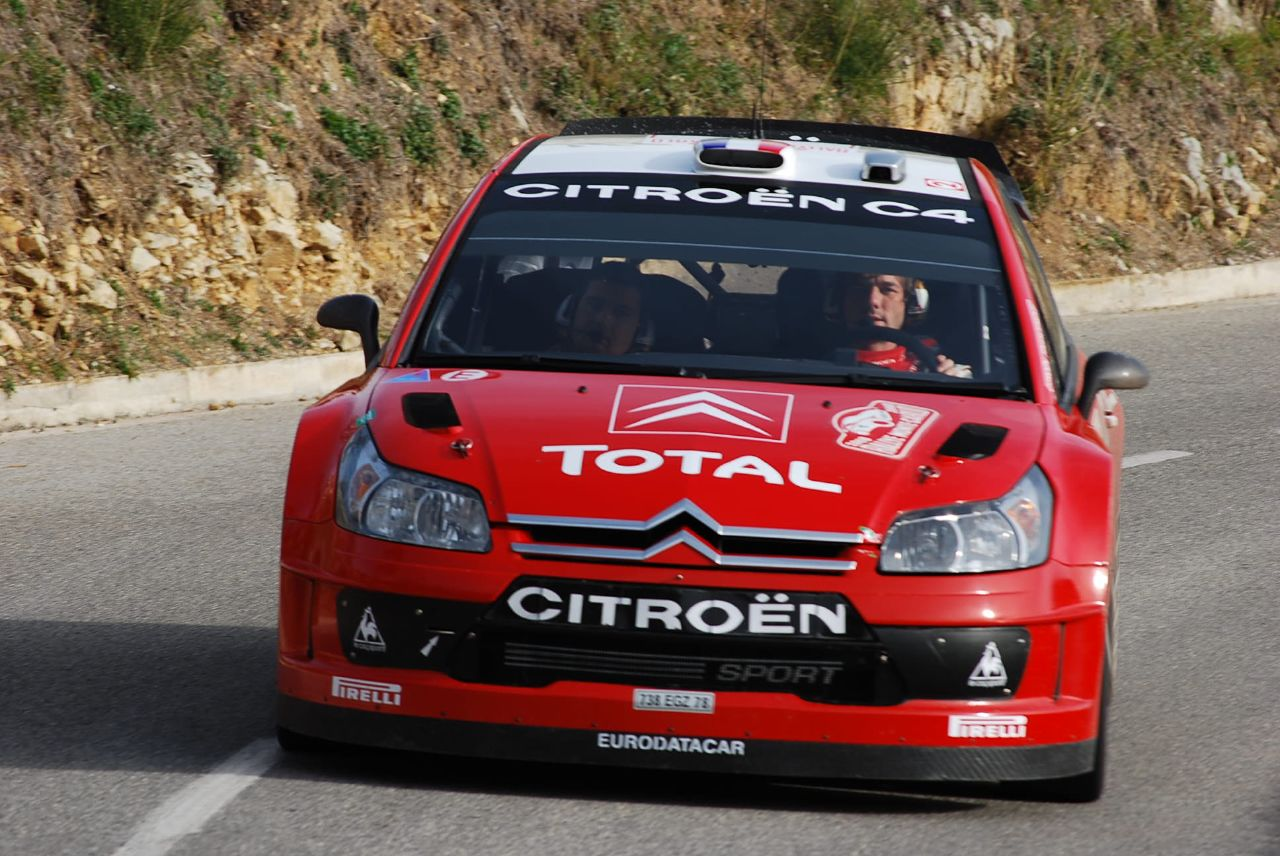
- Rally winner Sébastien Loeb during the event
- Host country: Monaco
- Rally base: Monte Carlo
- Dates run: January 24 – 27 2008
- Stages: 19 (365.09 km; 226.86 miles)
- Stage surface: Tarmac/Ice/Snow
- Overall distance: 1,481.25 km (920.41 miles)

Statistics
- Crews: 47 at start, 34 at finish

Overall results
- Overall winner: (France) Sébastien Loeb (France) Citroën Total World Rally Team

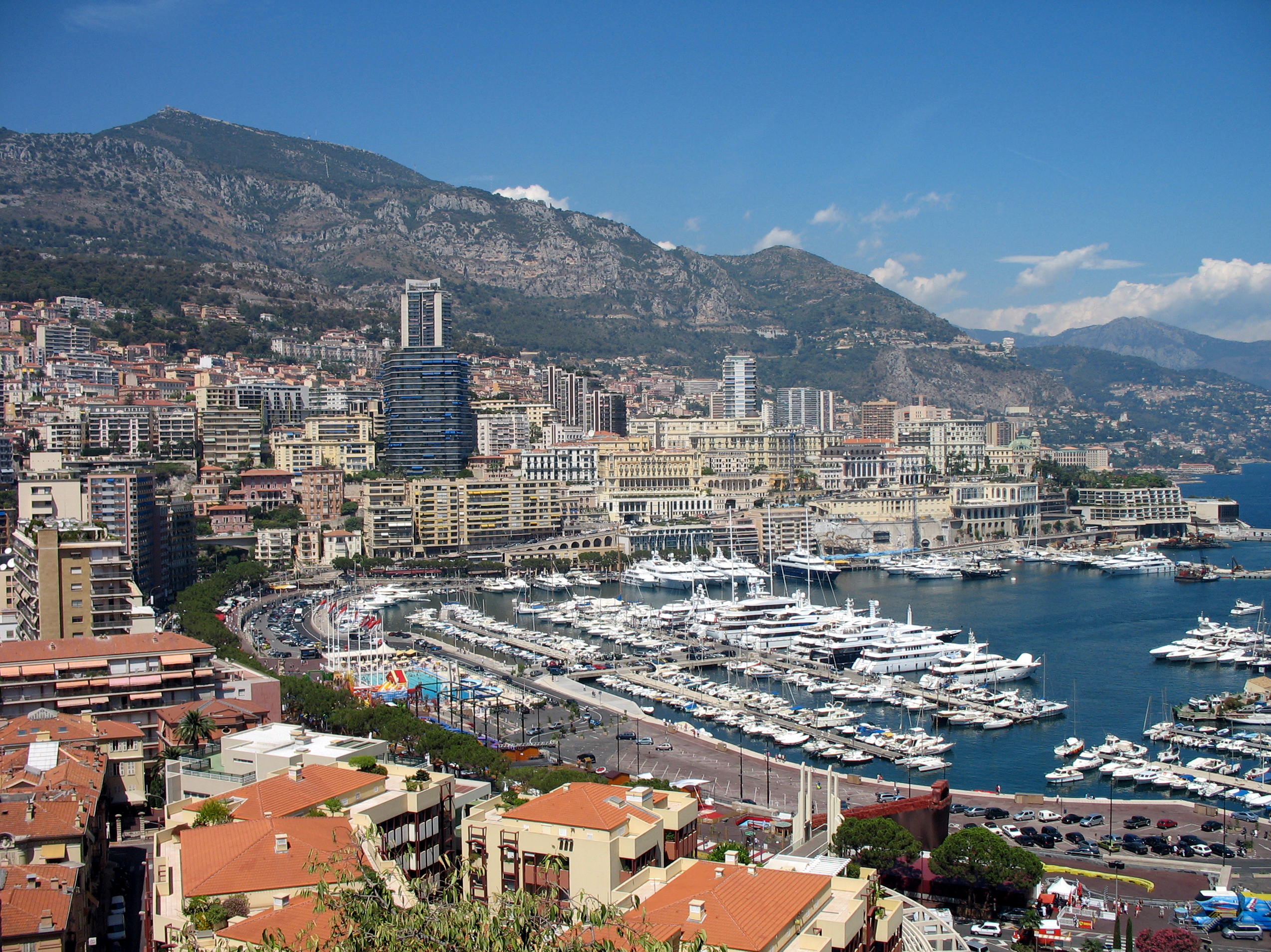
View of Monaco, rally base and SSS19 - Monaco Circuit host.

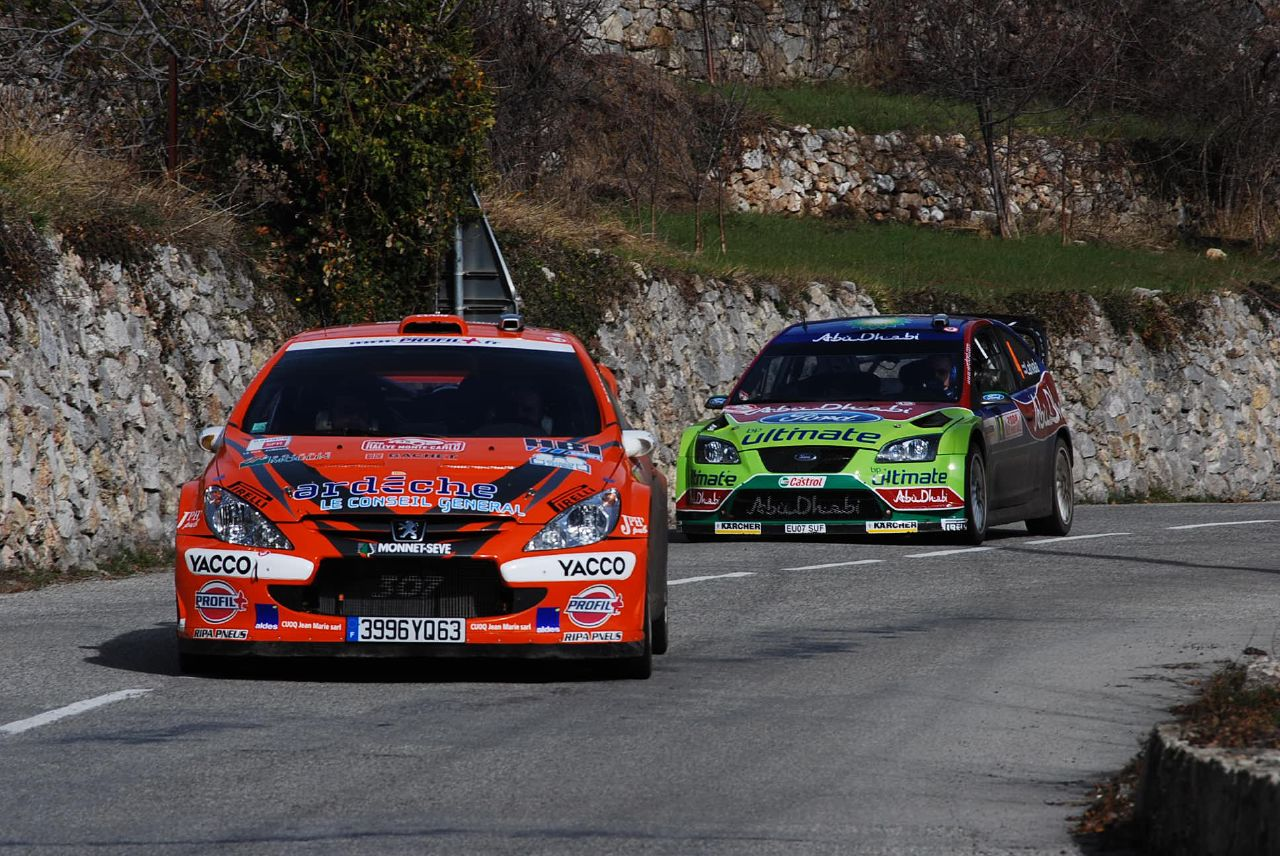
Jean-Marie Cuoq and Jari-Matti Latvala driving on liaison.

The 2008 Monte Carlo Rally, officially 76ème Rallye Automobile de Monte-Carlo, was the 76th Monte Carlo Rally and the first round of the 2008 World Rally Championship season. The rally took place during January 24–27, 2008, beginning with two stages driven in darkness throughout on Thursday and ending with a short super special around the harbour area of the Grand Prix circuit in Monaco on Sunday.

Sébastien Loeb took a record fifth Monte Carlo win for the Citroën Total World Rally Team. Ford's Mikko Hirvonen was second and Subaru's Chris Atkinson third, after a tight battle with François Duval; drivers finished the final Super Special Stage with exact times and ended the event with just above 1s time gap between them. Petter Solberg was fifth, followed by Gigi Galli, Jean-Marie Cuoq, Per-Gunnar Andersson, Henning Solberg and Matthew Wilson. Dani Sordo and Jari-Matti Latvala both retired from day three, but continued under the SupeRally rules and finished 11th and 12th respectively.

== Results ==
Pos.	Driver	Co-driver	Car	Time	Difference	Points
WRC
1.	(France) Sébastien Loeb	(Monaco) Daniel Elena	Citroën C4 WRC	3:39:17.0	0.0	10
2.	(Finland) Mikko Hirvonen	(Finland) Jarmo Lehtinen	Ford Focus RS WRC 07	3:41:51.4	2:34.4	8
3.	(Australia) Chris Atkinson	(Belgium) Stéphane Prévot	Subaru Impreza WRC2007	3:42:15.6	2:58.6	6
4.	(Belgium) François Duval	(Belgium) Eddy Chevalier	Ford Focus RS WRC 07	3:42:16.7	2:59.7	5
5.	(Norway) Petter Solberg	(Wales) Phil Mills	Subaru Impreza WRC2007	3:43:57.9	4:40.9	4
6.	(Italy) Gigi Galli	(Italy) Giovanni Bernacchini	Ford Focus RS WRC 07	3:48:03.5	8:46.5	3
7.	(France) Jean-Marie Cuoq	(France) Philippe Janvier	Peugeot 307 WRC	3:49:41.8	10:24.8	2
8.	(Sweden) Per-Gunnar Andersson	(Sweden) Jonas Andersson	Suzuki SX4 WRC	3:50:36.5 ^{[1]}	11:19.5	1
			^{[1]} — Including 40s penalty for being late out of the service zone.			

== Special stages ==
All dates and times are CET (UTC+1).

Day	Stage	Time	Name	Length	Winner	Time	Avg. spd.	Rally leader
1 (24 JAN)	SS1	18:46	Jean en Royans - Col de la Chau	28.12 km	(Spain) D. Sordo	14:08.9	119.3 km/h	(Spain) D. Sordo
1 (24 JAN)	SS2	19:36	La Cime du Mas - Col de Gaudissart	17.58 km	(France) S. Loeb	9:25.7	111.9 km/h	(France) S. Loeb
2 (25 JAN)	SS3	08:24	St. Pierreville - Col de la Fayolle 1	29.52 km	(France) S. Loeb	18:54.4	93.7 km/h	(France) S. Loeb
2 (25 JAN)	SS4	10:02	Burzet - Lachamp Raphael 1	16.30 km	(Spain) D. Sordo	9:37.1	101.7 km/h	(France) S. Loeb
2 (25 JAN)	SS5	10:48	St. Martial - Le Chambon - Beleac 1	12.66 km	(France) S. Loeb	8:06.2	93.7 km/h	(France) S. Loeb
2 (25 JAN)	SS6	14:51	St. Pierreville - Col de la Fayolle 2	29.52 km	(France) S. Loeb	18:41.8	94.7 km/h	(France) S. Loeb
2 (25 JAN)	SS7	16:29	Burzet - Lachamp Raphael 2	16.30 km	(France) S. Loeb	9:40.7	101.1 km/h	(France) S. Loeb
2 (25 JAN)	SS8	17:15	St. Martial - Le Chambon - Beleac 2	12.66 km	(France) S. Loeb	8:03.6	94.2 km/h	(France) S. Loeb
3 (26 JAN)	SS9	07:31	Labatie d'Andaure - Lalouvesc 1	19.37 km	(Spain) D. Sordo	11:18.1	102.8 km/h	(France) S. Loeb
3 (26 JAN)	SS10	08:13	St. Bonnet - St. Bonnet 1	25.36 km	(France) S. Loeb	12:39.0	120.3 km/h	(France) S. Loeb
3 (26 JAN)	SS11	09:38	Lamastre - Gilhoc - Alboussiere 1	21.66 km	(France) S. Loeb	12:59.8	100.0 km/h	(France) S. Loeb
3 (26 JAN)	SS12	12:52	Labatie d'Andaure - Lalouvesc 2	19.37 km	(France) S. Loeb	11:12.0	103.8 km/h	(France) S. Loeb
3 (26 JAN)	SS13	13:34	St. Bonnet - St. Bonnet 2	25.36 km	(Australia) C. Atkinson	12:23.9	122.7 km/h	(France) S. Loeb
3 (26 JAN)	SS14	14:59	Lamastre - Gilhoc - Alboussiere 2	21.66 km	(France) S. Loeb	13:08.4	98.9 km/h	(France) S. Loeb
4 (27 JAN)	SS15	09:50	La Bollene Vesubie - Moulinet 1	22.68 km	(Belgium) F. Duval	15:48.6	86.1 km/h	(France) S. Loeb
4 (27 JAN)	SS16	11:08	Luceram - Loda	15.34 km	(Spain) D. Sordo	10:51.7	84.7 km/h	(France) S. Loeb
4 (27 JAN)	SS17	11:51	La Bollene Vesubie - Moulinet 2	22.68 km	(Belgium) F. Duval	15:27.7	88.0 km/h	(France) S. Loeb
4 (27 JAN)	SS18	13:09	Luceram - Col des Portes	6.25 km	(Belgium) F. Duval	4:24.4	85.1 km/h	(France) S. Loeb
4 (27 JAN)	SS19	15:10	Monaco Circuit	2.70 km	(Australia) C. Atkinson (Belgium) F. Duval	1:40.7	96.5 km/h	(France) S. Loeb

== Championship standings after the event ==
=== Drivers' championship ===
Pos	Driver	MON (Monaco)	SWE (Sweden)	MEX (Mexico)	ARG (Argentina)	JOR (Jordan)	ITA (Italy)	GRC (Greece)	TUR (Turkey)	FIN (Finland)	GER (Germany)	NZL (New Zealand)	ESP (Spain)	FRA (France)	JPN (Japan)	GBR (United Kingdom)	Pts
1	(France) Sébastien Loeb	1															10
2	(Finland) Mikko Hirvonen	2															8
3	(Australia) Chris Atkinson	3															6
4	(Belgium) François Duval	4															5
5	(Norway) Petter Solberg	5															4
6	(Italy) Gigi Galli	6															3
7	(France) Jean-Marie Cuoq	7															2
8	(Sweden) Per-Gunnar Andersson	8															1
Pos	Driver	MON (Monaco)	SWE (Sweden)	MEX (Mexico)	ARG (Argentina)	JOR (Jordan)	ITA (Italy)	GRC (Greece)	TUR (Turkey)	FIN (Finland)	GER (Germany)	NZL (New Zealand)	ESP (Spain)	FRA (France)	JPN (Japan)	GBR (United Kingdom)	Pts

Key
Colour	Result
Gold	Winner
Silver	2nd place
Bronze	3rd place
Green	Points finish
Blue	Non-points finish
Blue	Non-classified finish (NC)
Purple	Did not finish (Ret)
Black	Excluded (EX)
Black	Disqualified (DSQ)
White	Did not start (DNS)
White	Cancelled (C)
Blank	Withdrew entry from the event (WD)

=== Manufacturers' championship ===
Rank	Driver	Event															Total points
Rank	Driver	MON (Monaco)	SWE (Sweden)	MEX (Mexico)	ARG (Argentina)	JOR (Jordan)	ITA (Italy)	GRC (Greece)	TUR (Turkey)	FIN (Finland)	GER (Germany)	NZL (New Zealand)	ESP (Spain)	FRA (France)	JPN (Japan)	GBR (United Kingdom)	Total points
1	(France) Citroën Total World Rally Team	11	-	-	-	-	-	-	-	-	-	-	-	-	-	-	11
2	(Japan) Subaru World Rally Team	10	-	-	-	-	-	-	-	-	-	-	-	-	-	-	10
3	(United Kingdom) BP Ford World Rally Team	8	-	-	-	-	-	-	-	-	-	-	-	-	-	-	8
3	(United Kingdom) Stobart M-Sport Ford Rally Team	8	-	-	-	-	-	-	-	-	-	-	-	-	-	-	8
5	(Japan) Suzuki World Rally Team	2	-	-	-	-	-	-	-	-	-	-	-	-	-	-	2
6	(Argentina) Munchi's Ford World Rally Team		-	-	-	-	-	-	-	-	-	-	-	-	-	-	0
