= Lachau =

- Commune
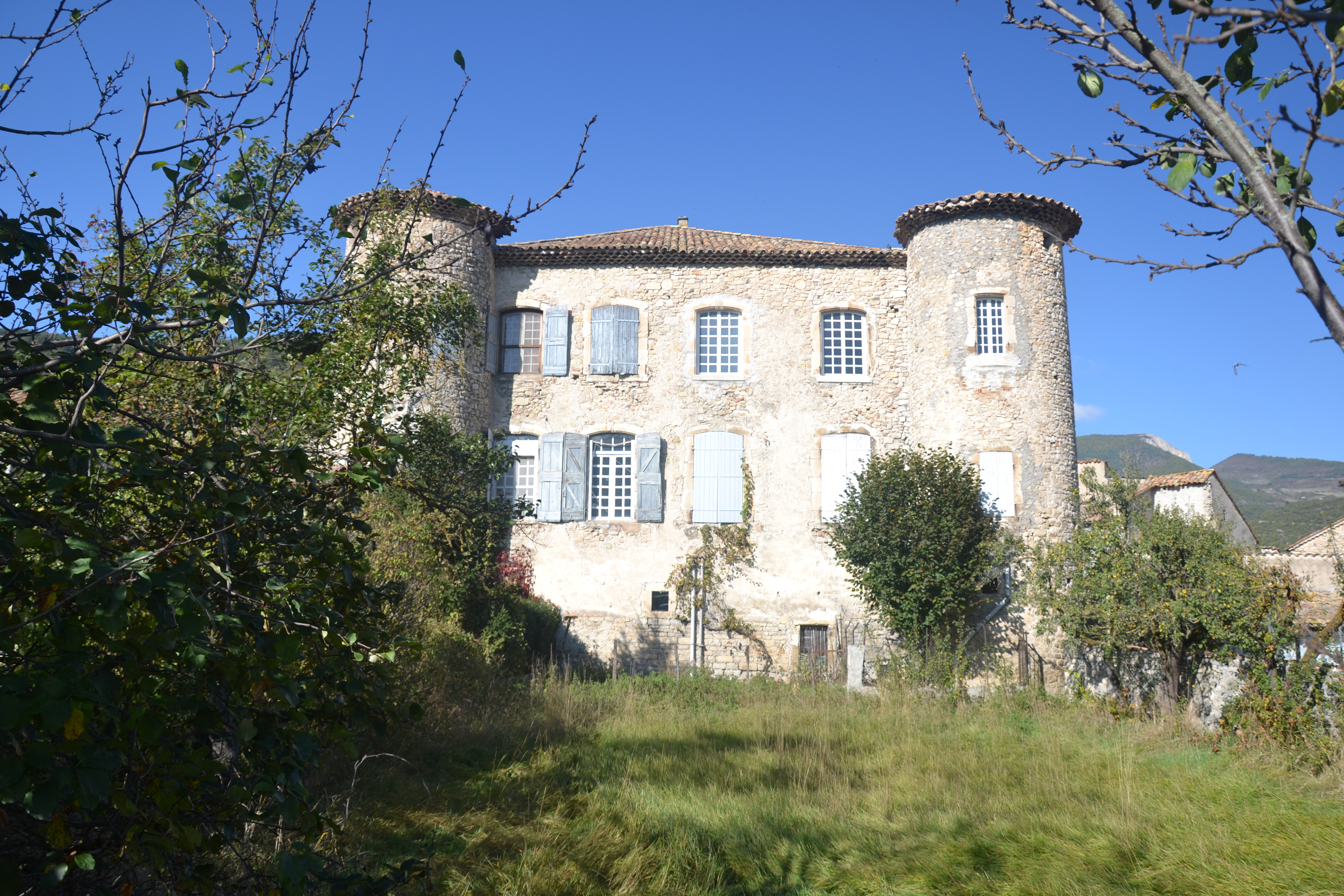
- The château of Lachau

- Coat of arms
- Location of Lachau
- Location within France Location within Auvergne-Rhône-Alpes
- Coordinates: 44°13′59″N 5°38′19″E
- Country: France
- Region: Auvergne-Rhône-Alpes
- Department: Drôme
- Arrondissement: Nyons
- Canton: Nyons et Baronnies

Government
  - Mayor (2020–2026): Philippe Magnus
- Area^{1}: 25.78 km^{2} (9.95 sq mi)
- Elevation: 750 m (2,460 ft)
- Highest elevation: 1,538 m (5,046 ft)
- Lowest elevation: 676 m (2,218 ft)
- Population (2023): 218
  - Density: 8.46/km^{2} (21.9/sq mi)
- Time zone: UTC+01:00 (CET)
  - Summer (DST): UTC+02:00 (CEST)
- INSEE/Postal code: 26154 /26560
- ^{1} French Land Register data, which excludes lakes, ponds, glaciers > 1 km^{2} (0.386 sq mi or 247 acres) and river estuaries.

Lachau (French pronunciation: [laʃo]) is a commune in the Drôme department in southeastern France.

== Population ==
Historical population
Year	Pop.	±% p.a.
1968	217	—
1975	225	+0.52%
1982	234	+0.56%
1990	190	−2.57%
1999	225	+1.90%
2007	206	−1.10%
2012	215	+0.86%
2017	232	+1.53%
2023	218	−1.03%
Source: INSEE

== See also ==
- Communes of the Drôme department
