= Saint-Barthélemy-Grozon =

- Commune
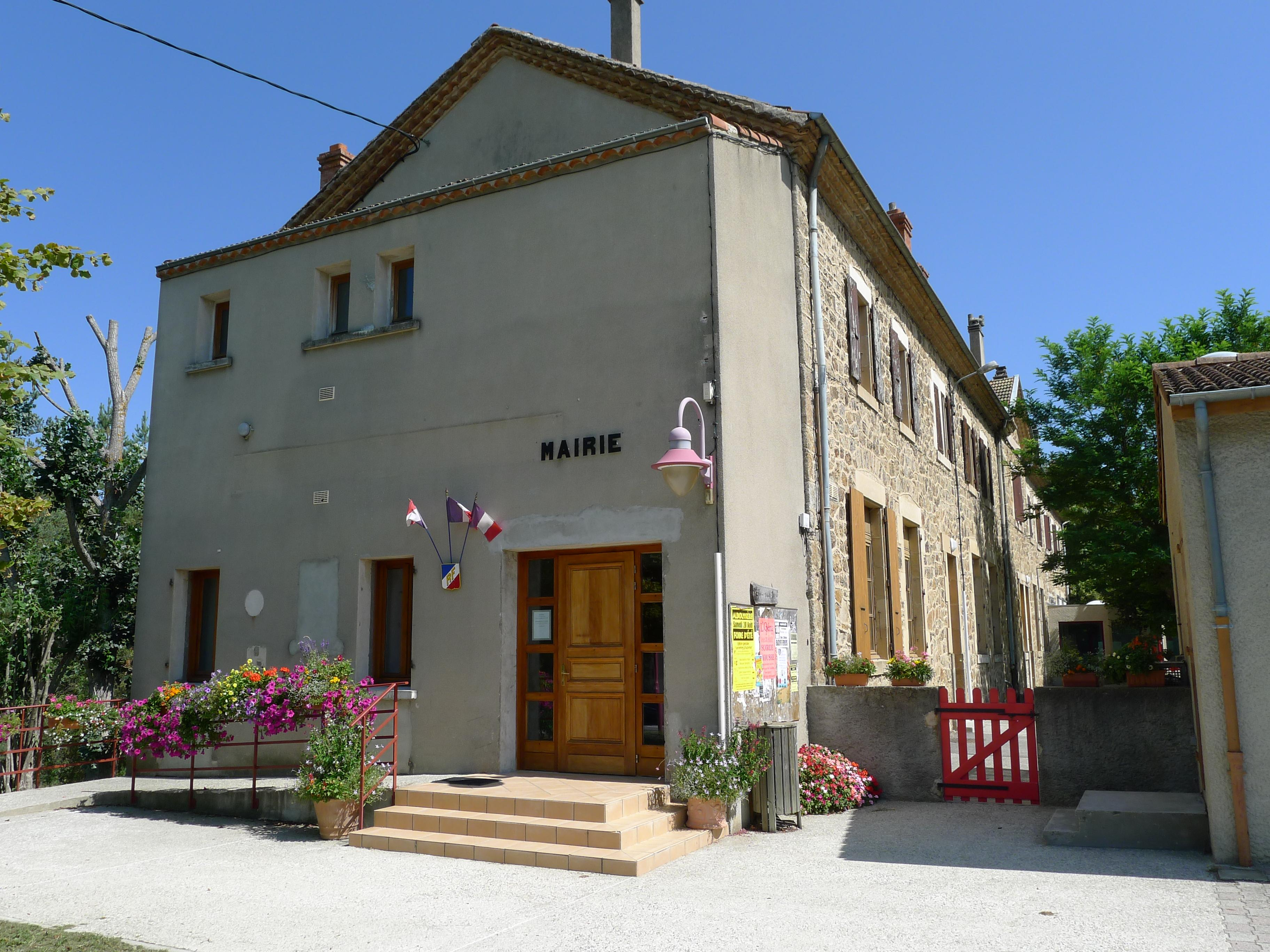
- Town hall

- Coat of arms
- Location of Saint-Barthélemy-Grozon
- Location within France Location within Auvergne-Rhône-Alpes
- Coordinates: 44°57′54″N 4°37′54″E
- Country: France
- Region: Auvergne-Rhône-Alpes
- Department: Ardèche
- Arrondissement: Tournon-sur-Rhône
- Canton: Haut-Vivarais

Government
  - Mayor (2020–2026): Jean-Paul Deculty
- Area^{1}: 19.4 km^{2} (7.5 sq mi)
- Elevation: 556 m (1,824 ft)
- Highest elevation: 949 m (3,114 ft)
- Lowest elevation: 479 m (1,572 ft)
- Population (2023): 494
  - Density: 25.5/km^{2} (66.0/sq mi)
- Time zone: UTC+01:00 (CET)
  - Summer (DST): UTC+02:00 (CEST)
- INSEE/Postal code: 07216 /07270
- ^{1} French Land Register data, which excludes lakes, ponds, glaciers > 1 km^{2} (0.386 sq mi or 247 acres) and river estuaries.

Saint-Barthélemy-Grozon (French pronunciation: [sɛ̃ baʁtelemi ɡʁozɔ̃]; Occitan: Sant Bertomieu e Grauson, before 1995: Saint-Barthélemy-le-Pin) is a commune in the Ardèche department in southern France.

== Population ==
Historical population
Year	Pop.	±% p.a.
1968	552	—
1975	481	−1.95%
1982	460	−0.64%
1990	428	−0.90%
1999	469	+1.02%
2007	516	+1.20%
2012	499	−0.67%
2017	506	+0.28%
2023	494	−0.40%
Source: INSEE

== See also ==
- Communes of the Ardèche department
