= Le Chambon, Ardèche =

Le Chambon sur Lignon
- Commune
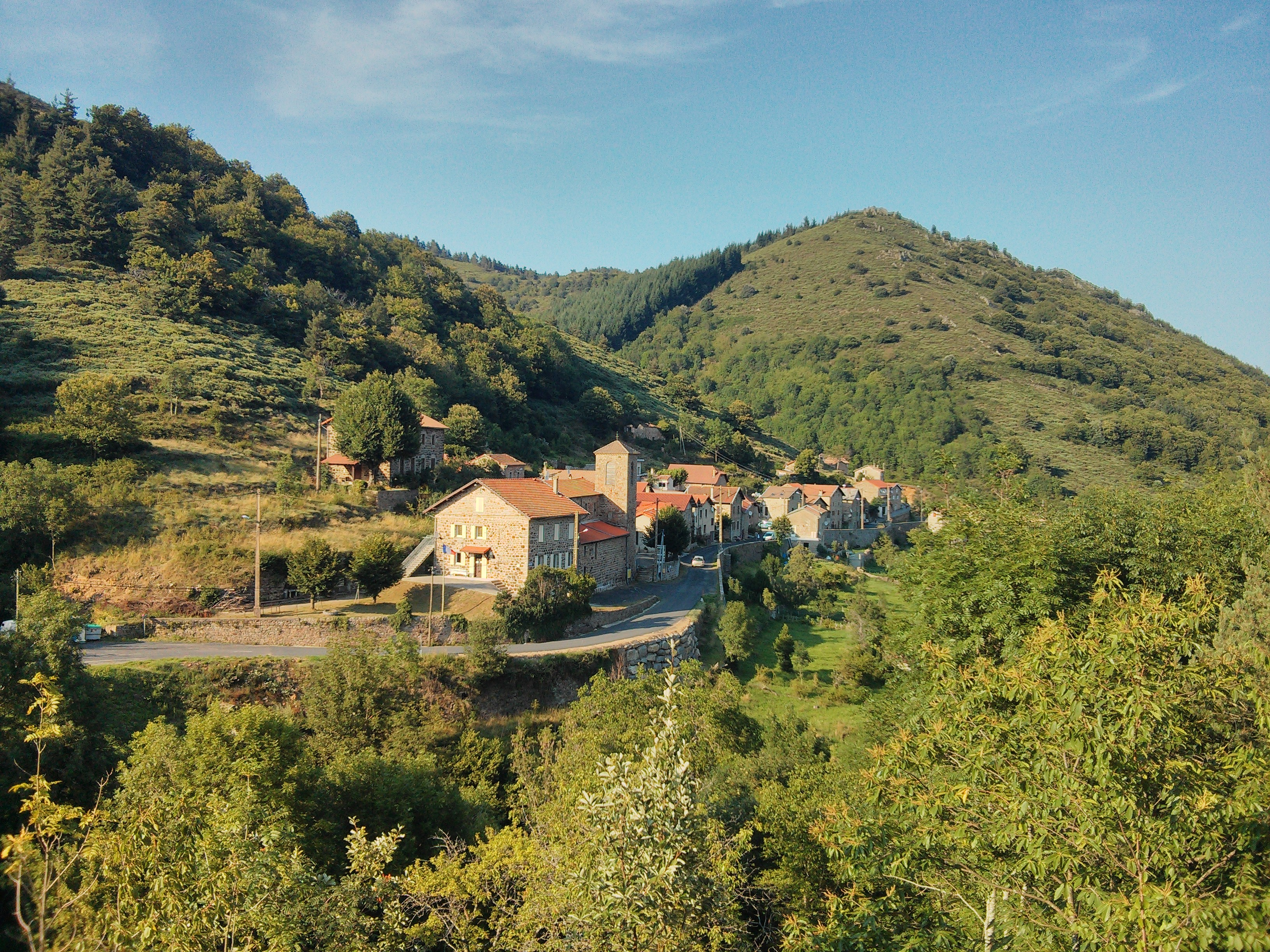
- A general view of Le Chambon
- Location of Le Chambon sur Lignon
- Location within France Location within Auvergne-Rhône-Alpes
- Coordinates: 44°50′16″N 4°18′23″E
- Country: France
- Region: Auvergne-Rhône-Alpes
- Department: Ardèche
- Arrondissement: Tournon-sur-Rhône
- Canton: Haut-Eyrieux

Government
  - Mayor (2020–2026): Nadine Ravaud
- Area^{1}: 10.52 km^{2} (4.06 sq mi)
- Elevation: 800 m (2,600 ft)
- Highest elevation: 1,420 m (4,660 ft)
- Lowest elevation: 687 m (2,254 ft)
- Population (2023): 58
  - Density: 5.5/km^{2} (14/sq mi)
- Time zone: UTC+01:00 (CET)
  - Summer (DST): UTC+02:00 (CEST)
- INSEE/Postal code: 07049 /07160
- ^{1} French Land Register data, which excludes lakes, ponds, glaciers > 1 km^{2} (0.386 sq mi or 247 acres) and river estuaries.

Le Chambon (French pronunciation: [lə ʃɑ̃bɔ̃]; Occitan: Lo Chambon) is a commune in the Ardèche department in southern France.

== Population ==
Historical population
Year	Pop.	±% p.a.
1968	150	—
1975	97	−6.04%
1982	94	−0.45%
1990	83	−1.54%
1999	74	−1.27%
2007	54	−3.86%
2012	52	−0.75%
2017	46	−2.42%
2023	58	+3.94%
Source: INSEE

== See also ==
- Communes of the Ardèche department
