= Saint-Pierreville =

- Commune
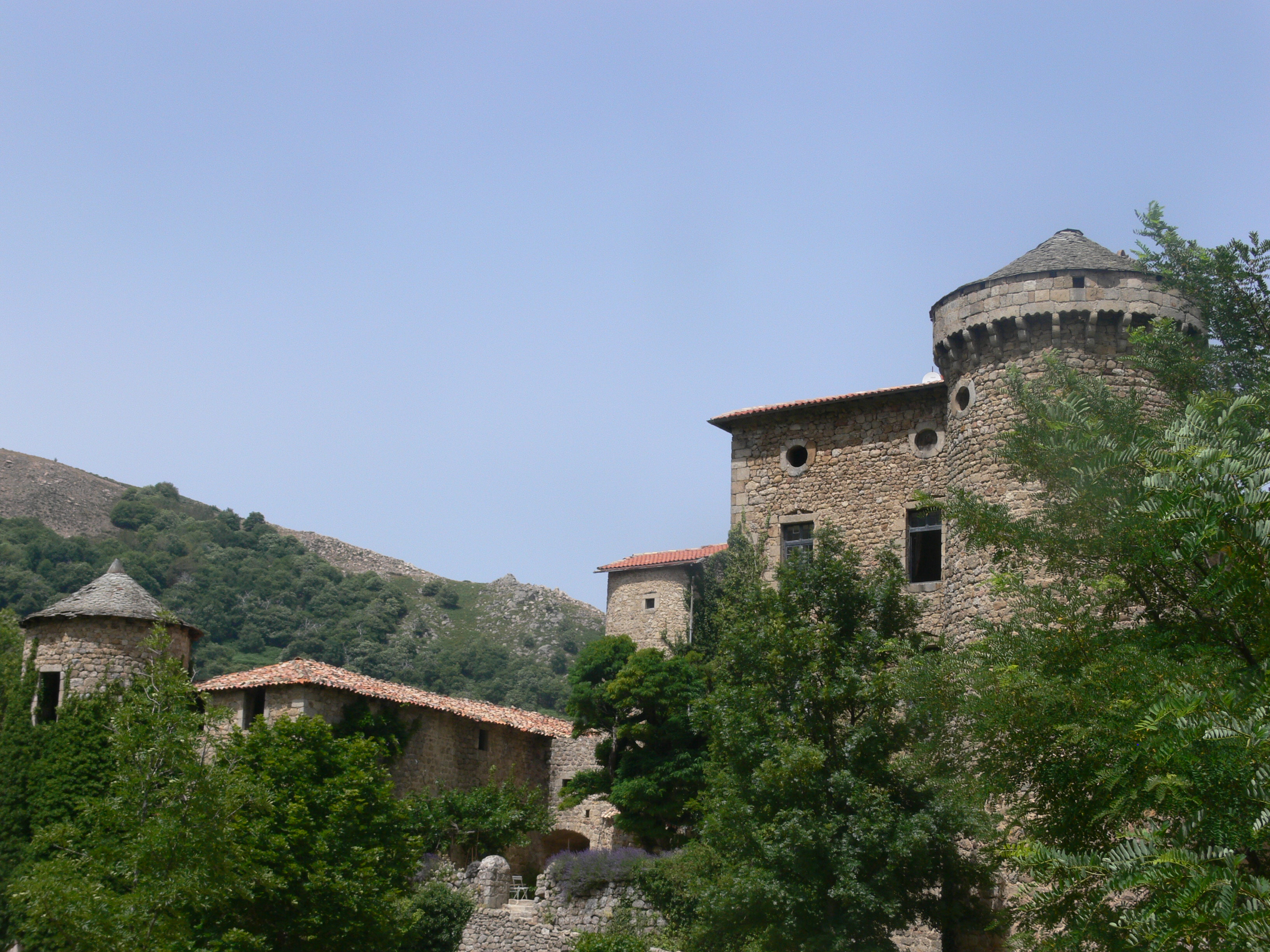
- Chateau Latour

- Coat of arms
- Location of Saint-Pierreville
- Location within France Location within Auvergne-Rhône-Alpes
- Coordinates: 44°49′00″N 4°29′16″E
- Country: France
- Region: Auvergne-Rhône-Alpes
- Department: Ardèche
- Arrondissement: Tournon-sur-Rhône
- Canton: Haut-Eyrieux

Government
  - Mayor (2020–2026): Florent Dumas
- Area^{1}: 20.56 km^{2} (7.94 sq mi)
- Elevation: 550 m (1,800 ft)
- Highest elevation: 1,005 m (3,297 ft)
- Lowest elevation: 398 m (1,306 ft)
- Population (2023): 510
  - Density: 25/km^{2} (64/sq mi)
- Time zone: UTC+01:00 (CET)
  - Summer (DST): UTC+02:00 (CEST)
- INSEE/Postal code: 07286 /07190
- ^{1} French Land Register data, which excludes lakes, ponds, glaciers > 1 km^{2} (0.386 sq mi or 247 acres) and river estuaries.

Saint-Pierreville (French pronunciation: [sɛ̃ pjɛʁvil]; Occitan: Sant Pèire Viala) is a commune in the Ardèche department in southern France.

== Population ==
Historical population
Year	Pop.	±% p.a.
1968	606	—
1975	537	−1.71%
1982	478	−1.65%
1990	528	+1.25%
1999	504	−0.52%
2007	508	+0.10%
2012	542	+1.30%
2017	544	+0.07%
2023	510	−1.07%
Source: INSEE

== See also ==
- Communes of the Ardèche department
