= Jean-Marie Cuoq =

French rally driver

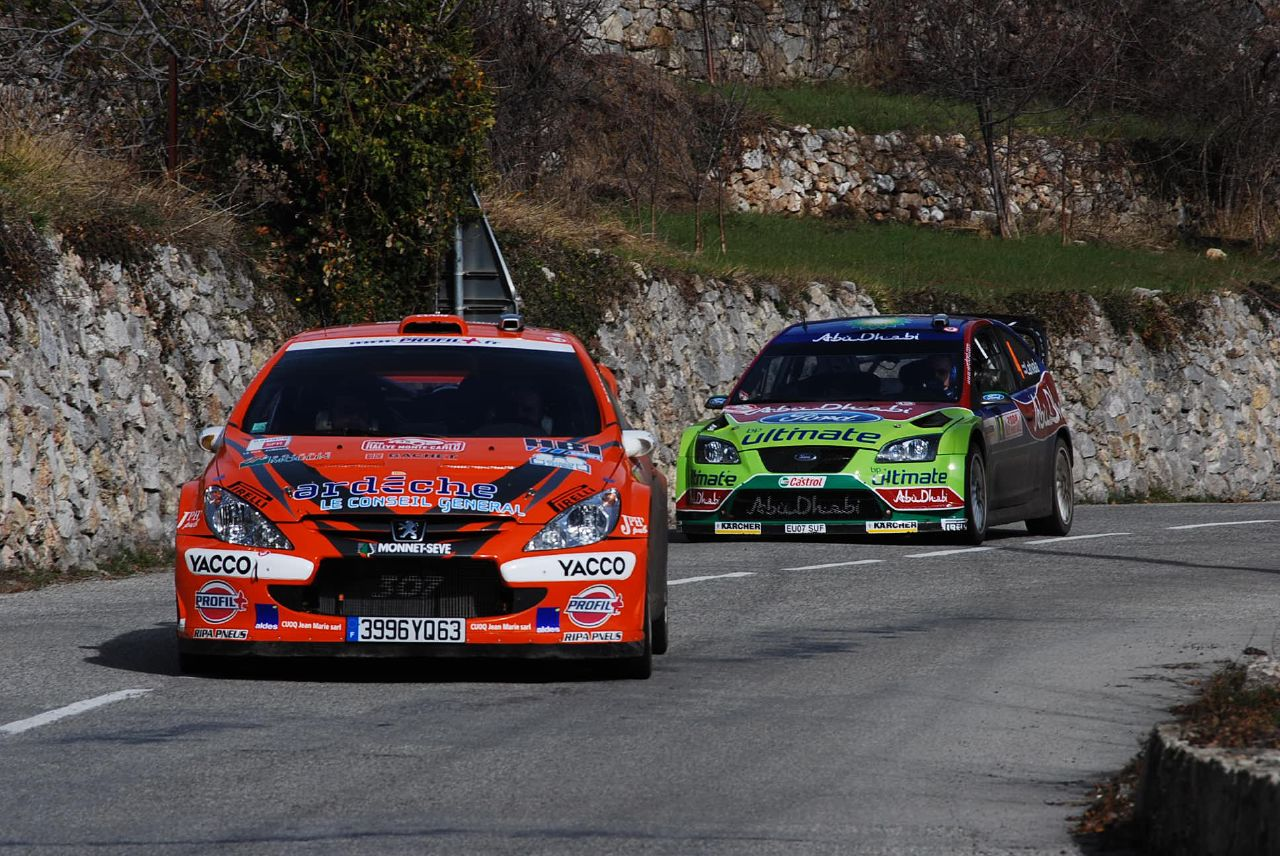
- Cuoq drives his Peugeot 307 WRC on a road section during the 2008 Monte Carlo Rally, where he finished seventh.

Personal information
- Nationality: (France) French
- Born: 21 September 1967 (age 59)

World Rally Championship record
- Years active: 2007 – 2010
- Co-driver: (France) David Marty (France) Philippe Janvier (France) Pascal Duffour
- Rallies: 3
- Championships: 0
- Rally wins: 0
- Podiums: 0
- Stage wins: 0
- Total points: 2
- First rally: 2007 Monte Carlo Rally
- Last rally: 2010 Rally de Portugal

Jean-Marie Cuoq (born 21 September 1967) is a French rally driver. He finished seventh on the 2008 Monte Carlo Rally in a privately entered Peugeot 307 WRC, scoring two World Rally Championship points.

== Career ==
Cuoq won the French Gravel Rally Championship in 2005, 2006, 2007 and 2010. In 2007, he also won the French asphalt title, but in February 2008 he was stripped of this title for having a notebook from the previous year during the reconnaissance for the Rallye du Var. He and co-driver David Marty also had their licenses suspended for 24 months, with 12 months suspended.

In January 2007, Cuoq made his World Rally Championship debut on Monte Carlo Rally where he finished ninth. One year later, he scored his first WRC points by finishing seventh.

After his suspension, Cuoq returned to the WRC for the 2010 Rally de Portugal, but retired from the rally.

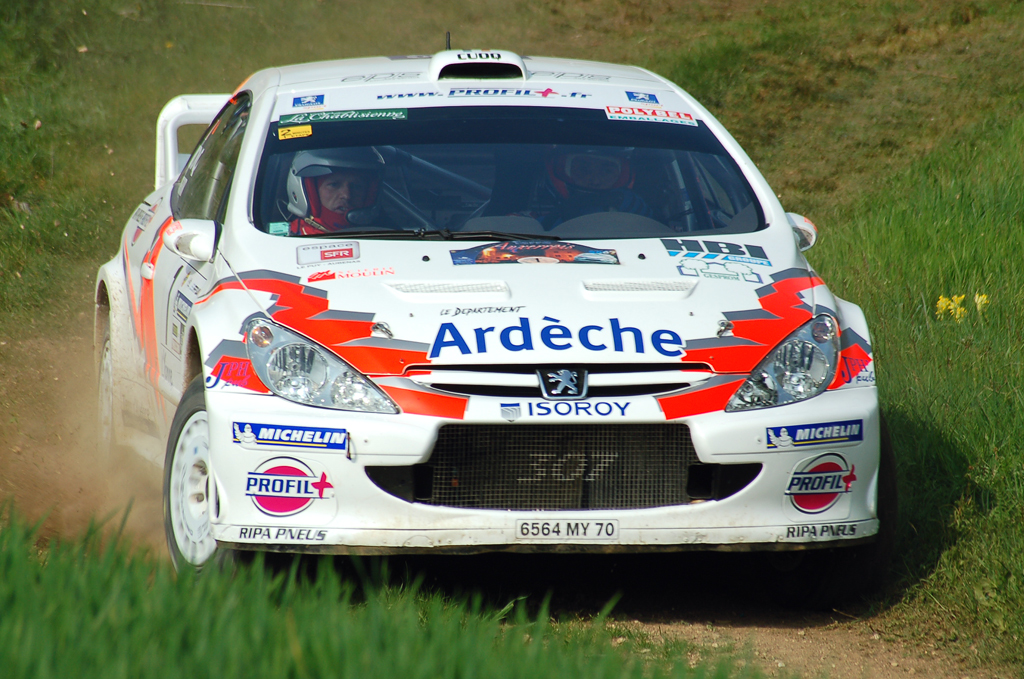
Cuoq on Rallye Terre de l'Auxerois in 2007.
