= Lachamp-Raphaël =

- Commune
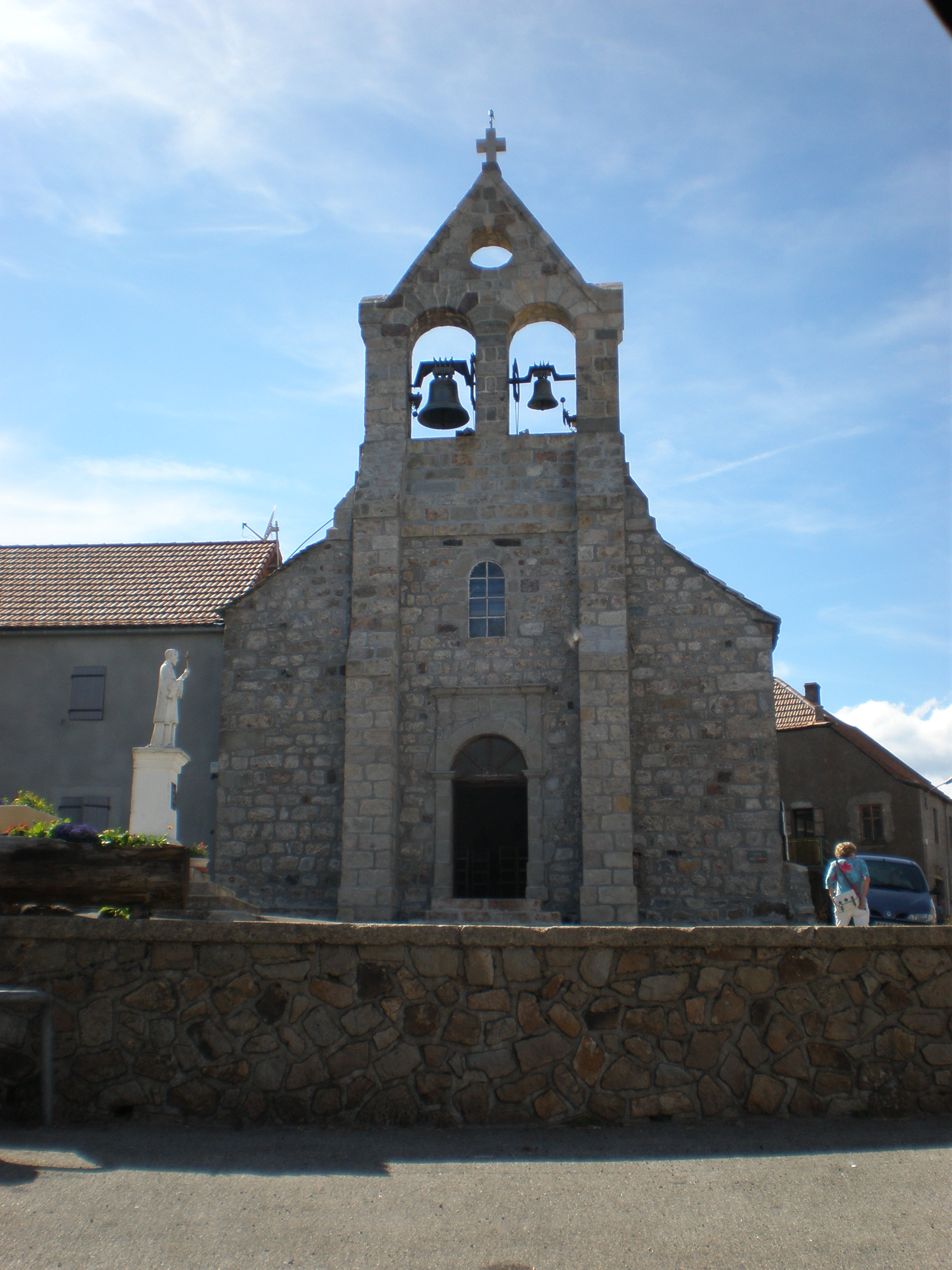
- The church in Lachamp-Raphaël
- Location of Lachamp-Raphaël
- Location within France Location within Auvergne-Rhône-Alpes
- Coordinates: 44°48′41″N 4°17′27″E
- Country: France
- Region: Auvergne-Rhône-Alpes
- Department: Ardèche
- Arrondissement: Largentière
- Canton: Aubenas-1

Government
  - Mayor (2020–2026): Dominique Allix
- Area^{1}: 14.09 km^{2} (5.44 sq mi)
- Elevation: 1,329 m (4,360 ft)
- Highest elevation: 1,445 m (4,741 ft)
- Lowest elevation: 1,058 m (3,471 ft)
- Population (2023): 70
  - Density: 5.0/km^{2} (13/sq mi)
- Time zone: UTC+01:00 (CET)
  - Summer (DST): UTC+02:00 (CEST)
- INSEE/Postal code: 07120 /07530
- ^{1} French Land Register data, which excludes lakes, ponds, glaciers > 1 km^{2} (0.386 sq mi or 247 acres) and river estuaries.

Lachamp-Raphaël (French pronunciation: [laʃɑ̃ ʁafaɛl]; Occitan: La Chalm Rafaièl) is a commune in the Ardèche department in southern France.

== Population ==
Historical population
Year	Pop.	±% p.a.
1968	227	—
1975	184	−2.96%
1982	157	−2.24%
1990	115	−3.82%
1999	117	+0.19%
2007	89	−3.36%
2012	79	−2.36%
2017	63	−4.43%
2023	70	+1.77%
Source: INSEE

== See also ==
- Communes of the Ardèche department
