= Saint-Martial, Ardèche =

Saint-Martial
- Commune
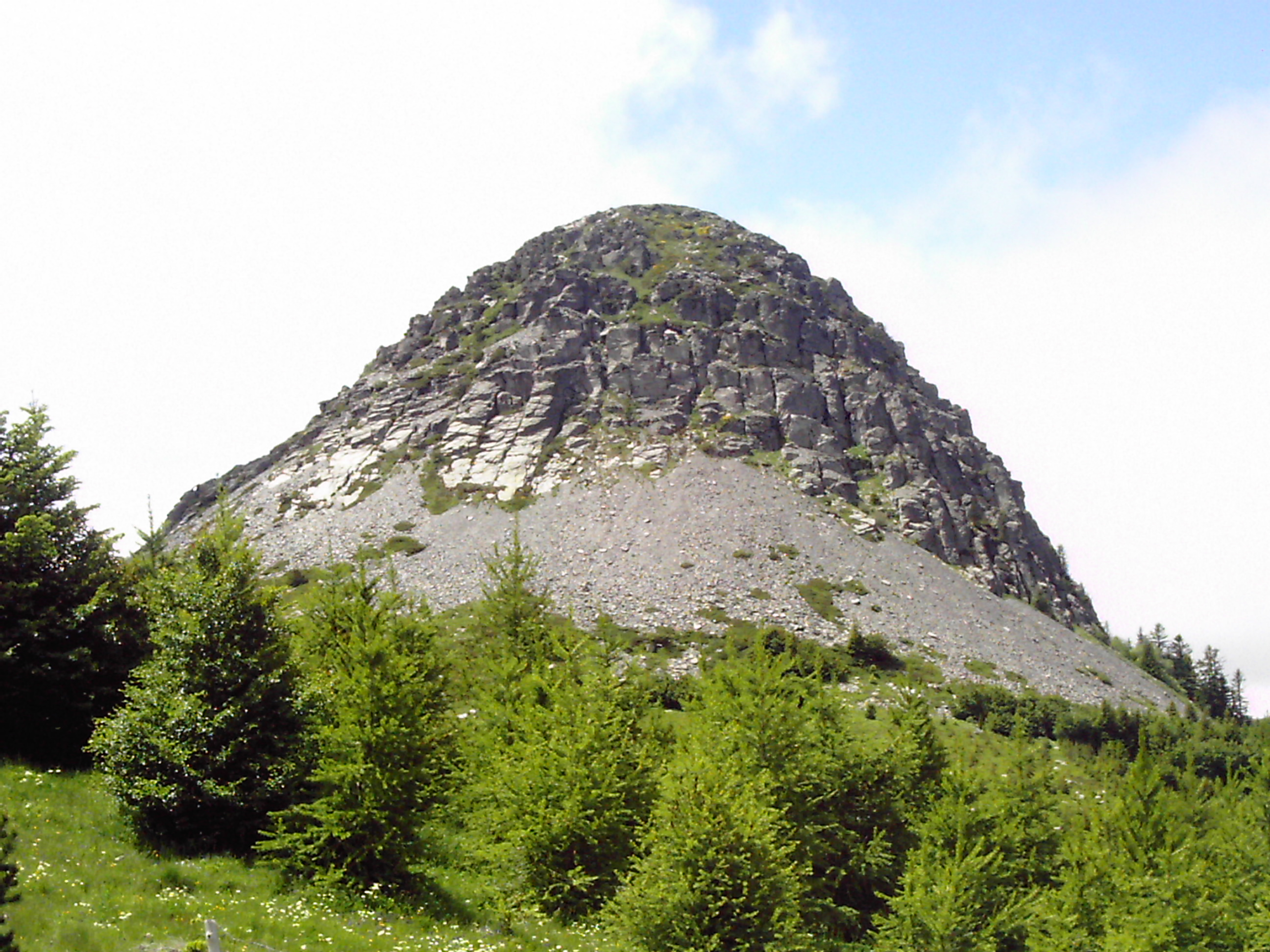
- Mont Gerbier de Jonc
- Location of Saint-Martial
- Location within France Location within Auvergne-Rhône-Alpes
- Coordinates: 44°52′06″N 4°16′32″E
- Country: France
- Region: Auvergne-Rhône-Alpes
- Department: Ardèche
- Arrondissement: Largentière
- Canton: Haut-Eyrieux

Government
  - Mayor (2020–2026): Martine Imbert
- Area^{1}: 36.18 km^{2} (13.97 sq mi)
- Elevation: 850 m (2,790 ft)
- Highest elevation: 1,528 m (5,013 ft)
- Lowest elevation: 679 m (2,228 ft)
- Population (2023): 269
  - Density: 7.44/km^{2} (19.3/sq mi)
- Time zone: UTC+01:00 (CET)
  - Summer (DST): UTC+02:00 (CEST)
- INSEE/Postal code: 07267 /07310
- ^{1} French Land Register data, which excludes lakes, ponds, glaciers > 1 km^{2} (0.386 sq mi or 247 acres) and river estuaries.

Saint-Martial (French pronunciation: [sɛ̃ maʁsjal]; Occitan: Sant Marciau) is a commune in the Ardèche department in southern France.

== Population ==
Historical population
Year	Pop.	±% p.a.
1968	496	—
1975	401	−2.99%
1982	339	−2.37%
1990	266	−2.99%
1999	271	+0.21%
2007	265	−0.28%
2012	243	−1.72%
2017	251	+0.65%
2023	269	+1.16%
Source: INSEE

== See also ==
- Communes of the Ardèche department
