= Labatie-d'Andaure =

- Commune
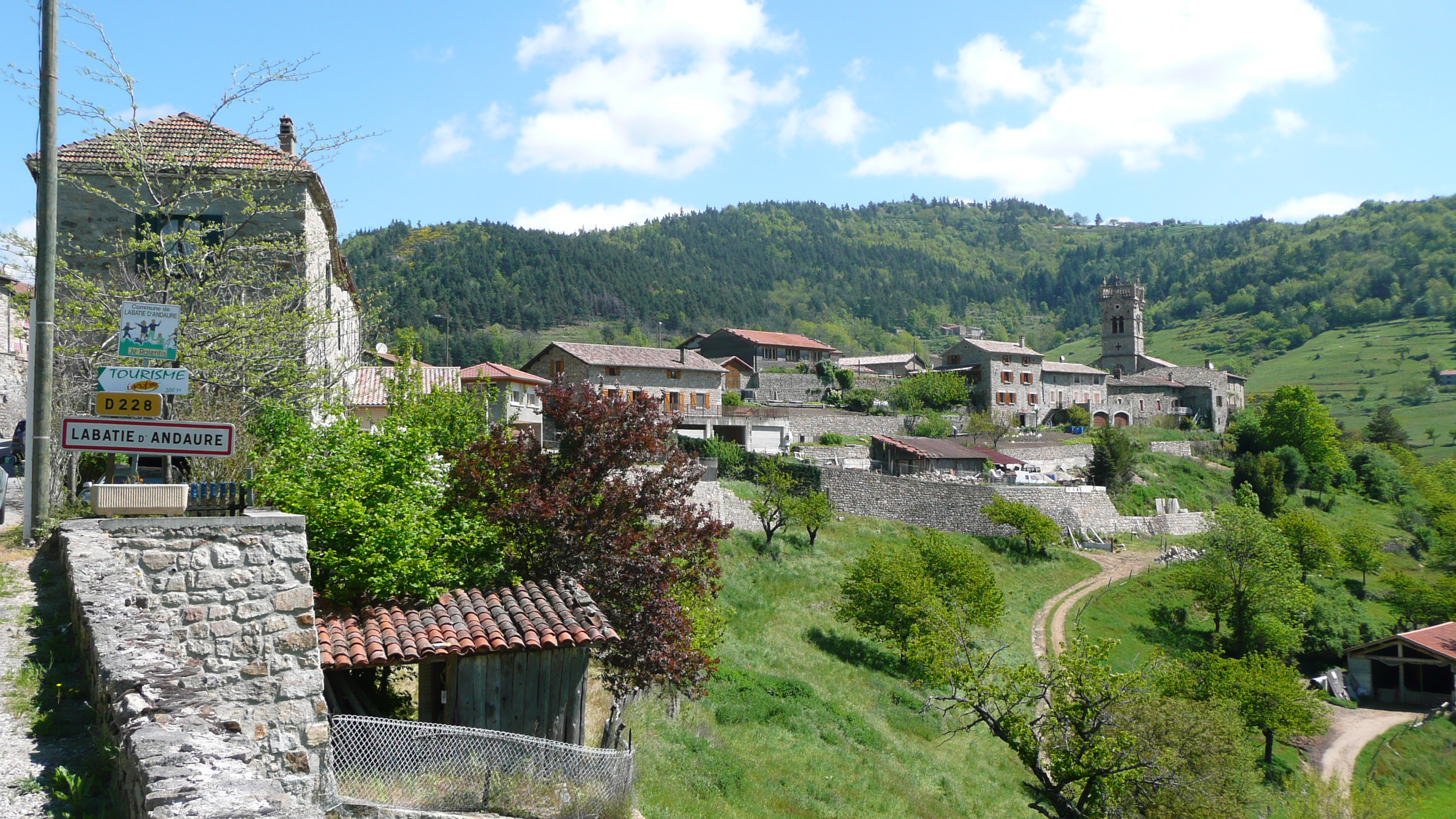
- A general view of Labatie-d'Andaure
- Location of Labatie-d'Andaure
- Location within France Location within Auvergne-Rhône-Alpes
- Coordinates: 45°01′33″N 4°29′37″E
- Country: France
- Region: Auvergne-Rhône-Alpes
- Department: Ardèche
- Arrondissement: Tournon-sur-Rhône
- Canton: Haut-Vivarais

Government
  - Mayor (2025–2026): Florent Rochedy
- Area^{1}: 9.93 km^{2} (3.83 sq mi)
- Elevation: 528 m (1,732 ft)
- Highest elevation: 1,003 m (3,291 ft)
- Lowest elevation: 473 m (1,552 ft)
- Population (2023): 228
  - Density: 23.0/km^{2} (59.5/sq mi)
- Time zone: UTC+01:00 (CET)
  - Summer (DST): UTC+02:00 (CEST)
- INSEE/Postal code: 07114 /07570
- ^{1} French Land Register data, which excludes lakes, ponds, glaciers > 1 km^{2} (0.386 sq mi or 247 acres) and river estuaries.

Labatie-d'Andaure (French pronunciation: [labati dɑ̃dɔʁ]; Occitan: La Bastia d'Andaura) is a commune in the Ardèche department in southern France.

== Population ==
Historical population
Year	Pop.	±% p.a.
1968	382	—
1975	307	−3.07%
1982	256	−2.56%
1990	203	−2.86%
1999	204	+0.05%
2007	200	−0.25%
2012	219	+1.83%
2017	206	−1.22%
2023	228	+1.71%
Source: INSEE

== See also ==
- Communes of the Ardèche department
