= 2008 Rally Japan =

Motor rally competition

2008 Rally Japan 5th Pioneer Carrozzeria Rally Japan
Round 14 of the 2008 World Rally Championship
← Previous event	Next event →
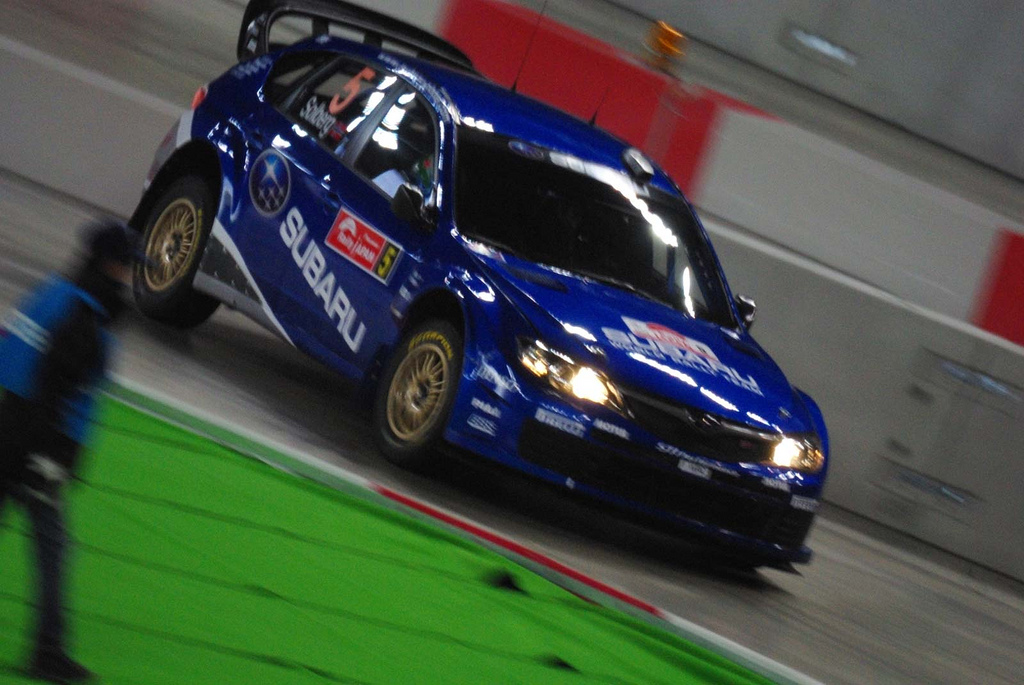
- Petter Solberg at the Sapporo Dome.
- Rally base: Sapporo
- Dates run: October 31 – November 2, 2008
- Stages: 29 (343.69 km; 213.56 miles)
- Stage surface: Gravel
- Overall distance: 1,316.28 km (817.90 miles)

Statistics
- Crews: 88 at start, 59 at finish

Overall results
- Overall winner: (Finland) Mikko Hirvonen (United Kingdom) BP Ford Abu Dhabi World Rally Team

The 2008 Rally Japan was the fourteenth and penultimate round of the 2008 World Rally Championship season. The event saw Sébastien Loeb clinch his fifth consecutive world drivers title with his drive to a third-place finish. The event was won by Mikko Hirvonen in a Ford Focus, who led the event from start to finish to claim his third win of the season. Second place went to Hirvonen's teammate Jari-Matti Latvala, his fifth podium of the year and his first since the Rally of Turkey back in June.

Stobart M-Sport Ford's François Duval crashed out from second place during the sixth stage. Duval was not injured in the crash, but his co-driver Patrick Pivato sustained a fractured pelvis and tibia. He was rushed to the hospital, and internal bleeding was discovered during surgery. On day two of the rally, after a second operation, his condition was described as critical but stable.

On the 19th stage, Toni Gardemeister took the Suzuki World Rally Team's first-ever stage win. Suzuki also had their most successful rally to date with Gardemeister finishing sixth and teammate Per-Gunnar Andersson recording his best ever finish of fifth position.

The event was originally planned to run on October 24−26, but as to make full use of venues, including the Sapporo Dome, with its tenant the Hokkaido Nippon Ham Fighters possibly needing it for the Japan Series, the event was approved by FIA to be delayed for a week. The dome was not needed for baseball, as the Ham Fighters didn't make it to the Japan Series.

The Sapporo Dome Super Special Stage was the second to be held in indoor venues in WRC history.

== Results ==
Pos.	Driver	Co-driver	Car	Time	Difference	Points
WRC
1.	(Finland) Mikko Hirvonen	(Finland) Jarmo Lehtinen	Ford Focus RS WRC 08	3:25:03.0	0.0	10
2.	(Finland) Jari-Matti Latvala	(Finland) Miikka Anttila	Ford Focus RS WRC 08	3:25:34.1	31.1	8
3.	(France) Sébastien Loeb	(Monaco) Daniel Elena	Citroën C4 WRC	3:27:33.6	2:30.6	6
4.	(Australia) Chris Atkinson	(Belgium) Stéphane Prévot	Subaru Impreza WRC2008	3:28:45.4	3:42.4	5
5.	(Sweden) Per-Gunnar Andersson	(Sweden) Jonas Andersson	Suzuki SX4 WRC	3:30:15.9	5:12.9	4
6.	(Finland) Toni Gardemeister	(Finland) Tomi Tuominen	Suzuki SX4 WRC	3:31:12.4	6:09.4	3
7.	(United Kingdom) Matthew Wilson	(United Kingdom) Scott Martin	Ford Focus RS WRC 07	3:32:08.3	7:05.3	2
8.	(Norway) Petter Solberg	(United Kingdom) Phil Mills	Subaru Impreza WRC2008	3:38:22.9	13:19.9	1
PCWRC
1.	(Finland) Juho Hänninen	(Finland) Mikko Markkula	Mitsubishi Lancer Evo IX	3:43:30.4	0.0	10
2.	(Russia) Evgeny Novikov	(Australia) Dale Moscatt	Mitsubishi Lancer Evo IX	3:43:36.7	6.3	8
3.	(Japan) Toshihiro Arai	(Australia) Glenn MacNeall	Subaru Impreza WRX STI	3:43:39.6	9.2	6

== Special stages ==
All dates and times are JST (UTC+9).

Day	Stage	Time	Name	Length	Winner	Time	Avg. spd.	Rally leader
1 (31 OCT)	SS1	09:11	Heper 1	13.24 km	(Finland) M. Hirvonen	9:57.9	79.7 km/h	(Finland) M. Hirvonen
1 (31 OCT)	SS2	09:39	Yuparo 1	11.10 km	(Finland) M. Hirvonen	8:24.2	79.3 km/h	(Finland) M. Hirvonen
1 (31 OCT)	SS3	10:42	Isepo 1	13.67 km	Cancelled			(Finland) M. Hirvonen
1 (31 OCT)	SS4	11:28	Pipaoi 1	5.74 km	(France) S. Loeb	3:17.3	104.7 km/h	(Finland) M. Hirvonen
1 (31 OCT)	SS5	14:28	Heper 2	13.24 km	(Finland) M. Hirvonen	9:35.6	82.8 km/h	(Finland) M. Hirvonen
1 (31 OCT)	SS6	14:56	Yuparo 2	11.10 km	(Finland) M. Hirvonen	8:02.5	82.8 km/h	(Finland) M. Hirvonen
1 (31 OCT)	SS7	15:59	Isepo 2	13.67 km	Cancelled			(Finland) M. Hirvonen
1 (31 OCT)	SS8	16:45	Pipaoi 2	5.74 km	Cancelled			(Finland) M. Hirvonen
1 (31 OCT)	SS9	18:14	Sapporo 1	1.49 km	(Finland) M. Hirvonen	1:39.4	54.0 km/h	(Finland) M. Hirvonen
1 (31 OCT)	SS10	18:24	Sapporo 2	1.49 km	(Finland) M. Hirvonen	1:41.6	52.8 km/h	(Finland) M. Hirvonen
2 (1 NOV)	SS11	08:28	Imeru 1	2.30 km	(Spain) D. Sordo	1:42.5	80.8 km/h	(Finland) M. Hirvonen
2 (1 NOV)	SS12	09:21	Nikara 1	31.12 km	(Norway) P. Solberg	18:37.0	100.3 km/h	(Finland) M. Hirvonen
2 (1 NOV)	SS13	10:37	Kamuycep 1	33.66 km	(Finland) J. Latvala	21:58.1	91.9 km/h	(Finland) M. Hirvonen
2 (1 NOV)	SS14	11:32	Kina 1	9.55 km	(Norway) H. Solberg	5:54.6	97.0 km/h	(Finland) M. Hirvonen
2 (1 NOV)	SS15	13:50	Imeru 2	2.30 km	(France) S. Loeb	1:42.5	80.8 km/h	(Finland) M. Hirvonen
2 (1 NOV)	SS16	14:43	Nikara 2	31.12 km	(Finland) J. Latvala	18:22.8	101.6 km/h	(Finland) M. Hirvonen
2 (1 NOV)	SS17	15:59	Kamuycep 2	33.66 km	(Finland) M. Hirvonen	21:22.7	94.5 km/h	(Finland) M. Hirvonen
2 (1 NOV)	SS18	16:54	Kina 2	9.55 km	(Finland) M. Hirvonen	5:54.3	97.0 km/h	(Finland) M. Hirvonen
2 (1 NOV)	SS19	18:09	Sapporo 3	1.49 km	(Finland) T. Gardemeister (Spain) D. Sordo	1:25.4	62.8 km/h	(Finland) M. Hirvonen
2 (1 NOV)	SS20	18:09	Sapporo 4	1.49 km	(Spain) D. Sordo	1:23.2	64.5 km/h	(Finland) M. Hirvonen
3 (2 NOV)	SS21	07:07	Koyka 1	3.57 km	(Norway) P. Solberg	2:00.2	106.9 km/h	(Finland) M. Hirvonen
3 (2 NOV)	SS22	07:56	Iwanke 1	13.57 km	(Finland) M. Hirvonen	8:13.0	99.1 km/h	(Finland) M. Hirvonen
3 (2 NOV)	SS23	08:21	Sikot 1	27.76 km	(Finland) J. Latvala	17:49.5	93.4 km/h	(Finland) M. Hirvonen
3 (2 NOV)	SS24	08:53	Imeru 3	2.30 km	(Finland) J. Latvala	1:57.3	70.6 km/h	(Finland) M. Hirvonen
3 (2 NOV)	SS25	10:06	Sapporo 5	1.49 km	(South Korea) A. Kim	1:45.7	50.7 km/h	(Finland) M. Hirvonen
3 (2 NOV)	SS26	11:58	Koyka 2	3.57 km	(Finland) M. Hirvonen	2:08.6	99.9 km/h	(Finland) M. Hirvonen
3 (2 NOV)	SS27	12:47	Iwanke 2	13.57 km	(Finland) M. Hirvonen	8:39.9	94.0 km/h	(Finland) M. Hirvonen
3 (2 NOV)	SS28	13:12	Sikot 2	27.76 km	(Norway) P. Solberg	18:00.2	92.5 km/h	(Finland) M. Hirvonen
3 (2 NOV)	SS29	13:44	Imeru 4	2.30 km	(Norway) P. Solberg	2:03.8	66.9 km/h	(Finland) M. Hirvonen

== Championship standings after the event ==
=== Drivers' championship ===
Pos	Driver	MON (Monaco)	SWE (Sweden)	MEX (Mexico)	ARG (Argentina)	JOR (Jordan)	ITA (Italy)	GRC (Greece)	TUR (Turkey)	FIN (Finland)	GER (Germany)	NZL (New Zealand)	ESP (Spain)	FRA (France)	JPN (Japan)	GBR (United Kingdom)	Pts
1	(France) Sébastien Loeb	1	Ret	1	1	10	1	1	3	1	1	1	1	1	3		112
2	(Finland) Mikko Hirvonen	2	2	4	5	1	2	3	1	2	4	3	3	2	1		102
3	(Spain) Dani Sordo	11	6	17	3	2	5	5	4	4	2	2	2	Ret	DSQ		59
4	(Finland) Jari-Matti Latvala	12	1	3	15	7	3	7	2	39	9	Ret	6	4	2		50
5	(Australia) Chris Atkinson	3	21	2	2	3	6	Ret	13	3	6	Ret	7	6	4		50
6	(Norway) Petter Solberg	5	4	12	Ret	Ret	10	2	6	6	5	4	5	5	8		41
7	(Belgium) François Duval	4									3	Ret	4	3	Ret		22
8	(Norway) Henning Solberg	9	13	5	Ret	4	7	8	5	5	7	9	11	15	Ret		22
9	(Italy) Gigi Galli	6	3	Ret	7	8	4	Ret	Ret	Ret	Ret	Inj	Inj	Inj	Inj		17
10	(United Kingdom) Matthew Wilson	10	Ret	6	Ret	5	12	6	7	9	12	17	9	8	7		15
11	(Estonia) Urmo Aava		18			Ret	8	4	Ret	16	8	5	35	7			13
12	(Argentina) Federico Villagra			7	6	6	14	13	9	Ret		8	12		9		9
13	(Finland) Toni Gardemeister	Ret	7	Ret	Ret	Ret	Ret	9	Ret	8	10	7	13	13	6		8
14	(Sweden) Per-Gunnar Andersson	8	Ret	Ret	24	Ret	9	11	Ret	Ret	15	6	32	17	5		8
15	(Zimbabwe) Conrad Rautenbach	Ret	16	16	4	26	13	10	8	10	10	Ret	Ret	14	Ret		6
16	(Norway) Andreas Mikkelsen		5				Ret		19	12	11		8	11			5
17	(France) Jean-Marie Cuoq	7															2
17	(Finland) Matti Rantanen									7							2
19	(Finland) Juho Hänninen		8					21		13		14	29	24	10		1
19	(France) Sébastien Ogier			8		11	22			36	19		Ret	20			1
19	(Austria) Andreas Aigner		31		8			14	11	Ret		Ret					1
Pos	Driver	MON (Monaco)	SWE (Sweden)	MEX (Mexico)	ARG (Argentina)	JOR (Jordan)	ITA (Italy)	GRC (Greece)	TUR (Turkey)	FIN (Finland)	GER (Germany)	NZL (New Zealand)	ESP (Spain)	FRA (France)	JPN (Japan)	GBR (United Kingdom)	Pts

Key
Colour	Result
Gold	Winner
Silver	2nd place
Bronze	3rd place
Green	Points finish
Blue	Non-points finish
Blue	Non-classified finish (NC)
Purple	Did not finish (Ret)
Black	Excluded (EX)
Black	Disqualified (DSQ)
White	Did not start (DNS)
White	Cancelled (C)
Blank	Withdrew entry from the event (WD)

=== Manufacturers' championship ===
Rank	Team	Event															Total points
Rank	Team	MON (Monaco)	SWE (Sweden)	MEX (Mexico)	ARG (Argentina)	JOR (Jordan)	ITA (Italy)	GRC (Greece)	TUR (Turkey)	FIN (Finland)	GER (Germany)	NZL (New Zealand)	ESP (Spain)	FRA (France)	JPN (Japan)	GBR (United Kingdom)	Total points
1	(France) Citroën Total World Rally Team	11	4	10	16	9	14	15	11	15	18	18	18	10	6	-	175
2	(United Kingdom) BP Ford World Rally Team	8	18	11	7	13	14	10	18	9	7	6	11	14	18	-	164
3	(Japan) Subaru World Rally Team	10	6	9	8	6	3	8	3	9	7	5	6	7	6	-	93
4	(United Kingdom) Stobart M-Sport Ford Rally Team	8	8	3	3	7	5	3	4	4	6	0	4	7	2	-	64
5	(Japan) Suzuki World Rally Team	2	3	0	1	0	1	3	0	2	1	7	0	1	7	-	28
6	(Argentina) Munchi's Ford World Rally Team	0	0	6	4	4	2	0	3	0	0	3	0	0	0	-	22
