= Suzuki SX4 WRC =

Suzuki World Rally Car

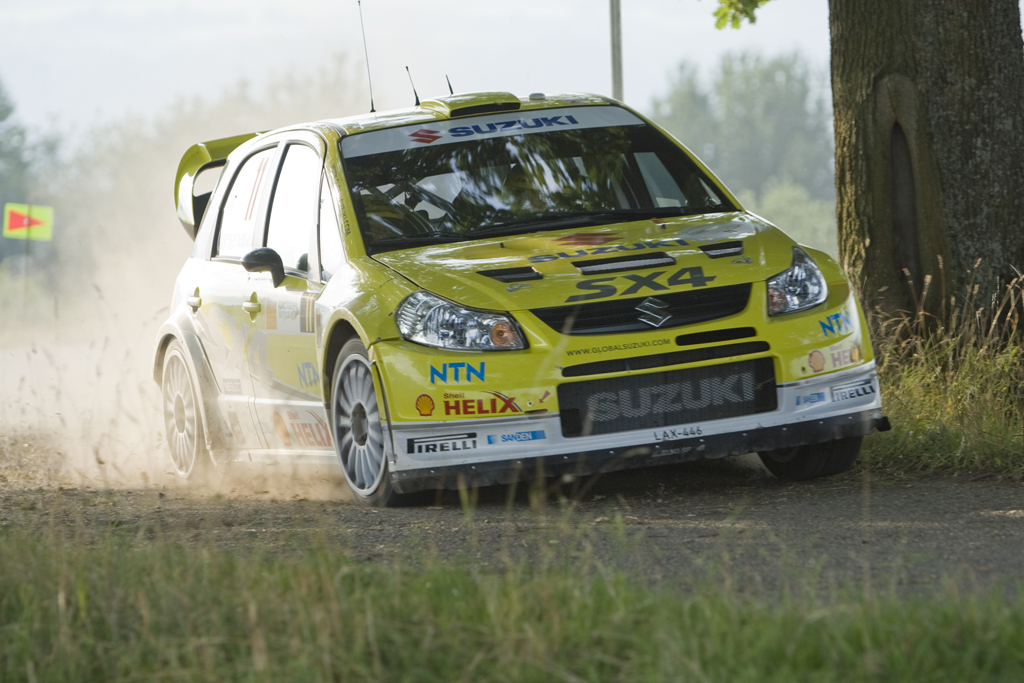
- Category: World Rally Car
- Constructor: Suzuki World Rally Team

Technical specifications
- Length: 4,135 mm (162.8 in)
- Width: 1,770 mm (69.7 in)
- Height: 1,450 mm (57.1 in)
- Wheelbase: 2,550 mm (100.4 in)
- Engine: Suzuki J20A 1,995 cc (121.7 cu in) I4 turbo charge Front transverse
- Transmission: Five-speed sequential 4-wheel drive
- Weight: 1,230 kg (2,711.7 lb)
- Tyres: Pirelli

Competition history (WRC)
- Notable entrants: (Japan) Suzuki World Rally Team
- Notable drivers: (Sweden) Per-Gunnar Andersson; (France) Nicolas Bernardi; (Finland) Toni Gardemeister; (Finland) Sebastian Lindholm
- Debut: (France) 2007 Tour de Corse
Races	Wins	Podiums	Titles
17	0	0	0
- Constructors' Championships: 0
- Drivers' Championships: 0

The Suzuki SX4 WRC is a World Rally Car built for the Suzuki World Rally Team by Suzuki in the World Rally Championship. It is based upon the Suzuki SX4 road car, and was debuted at the 2007 Tour de Corse.

== Competition history ==
=== World Rally Championship ===
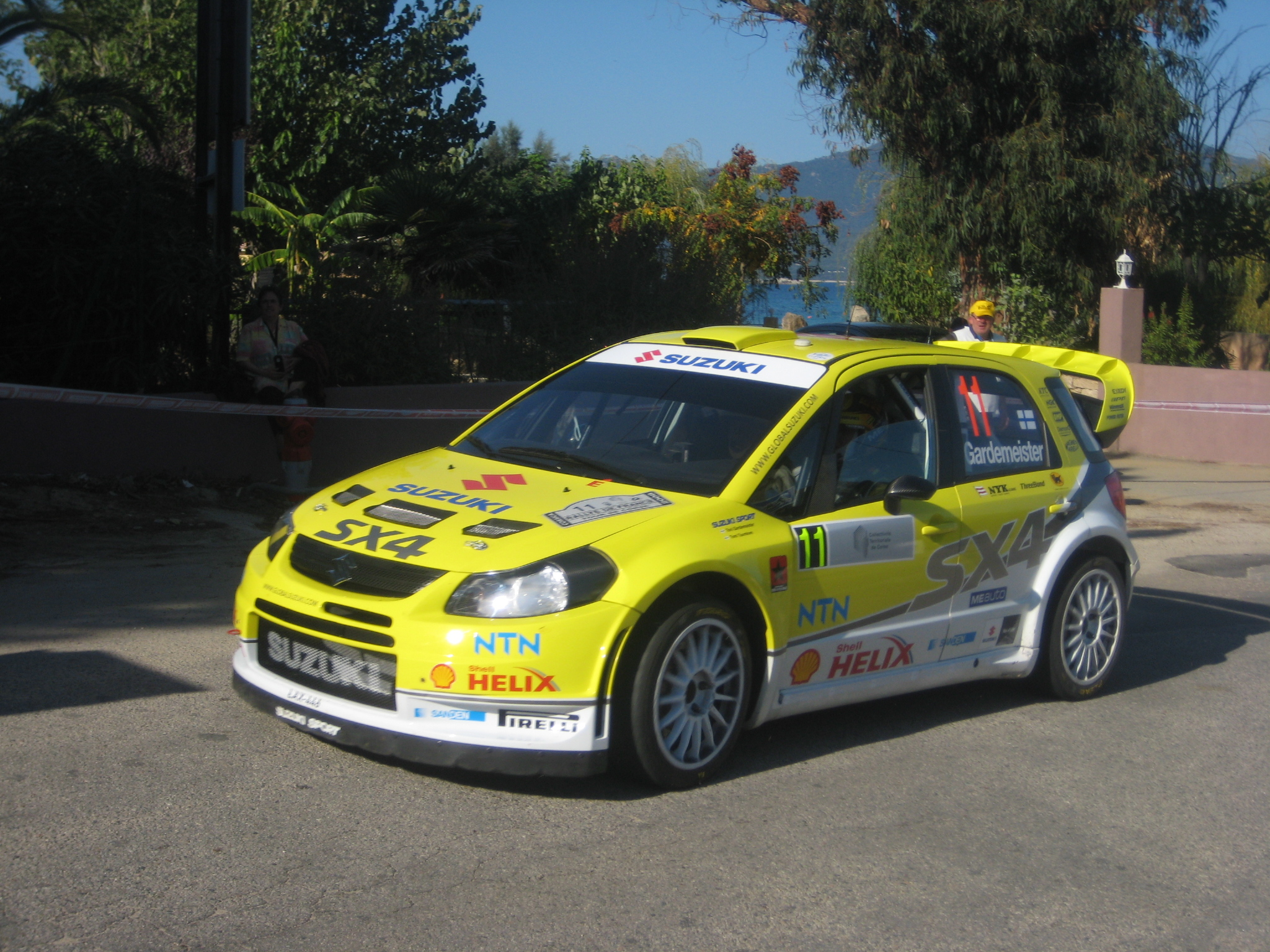
Toni Gardemeister's Suzuki SX4 WRC at the 2008 Tour de Corse.

At the 2007 Geneva Motor Show, Suzuki announced it would enter the FIA World Rally Championship, with the factory backed Suzuki World Rally Team in the World Rally Car category in 2007, using the SX4 WRC with AWD and the J20 engine producing 320 PS (235 kW; 316 hp) and 590 N⋅m (440 lb⋅ft) of torque. However, due to WRC calendar changes Suzuki officially debuted in 2008, using the season of 2007 as further development time for the SX4.

The SX4 competed on a test basis in two 2007 WRC events: the Rallye de France in October 2007 (finishing 31st overall) and the Rally GB in November 2007 (finishing 27th overall). In the first event of 2008, the Rallye Monte Carlo, Suzuki driver Per-Gunnar Andersson finished eighth.

=== Hillclimbing ===
A race car called 'Suzuki SX4 Hill Climb Special' was used at the 2011 Pikes Peak International Hill Climb. It was a specially adapted Suzuki SX4, with a twin turbocharged 3.1 litre V6 engine producing 910 hp (679 kW; 923 PS) and 890 N⋅m (660 lb⋅ft) of torque. Driver Nobuhiro Tajima won the event in Suzukis for six years running, the last three of which were in the SX4 HCS, and set the track record time of 9:51.278.

== Rally results ==
=== Complete World Rally Championship results ===
Year	Car	No	Driver	1	2	3	4	5	6	7	8	9	10	11	12	13	14	15	16	WDC	Points	TC	Points
2007	Suzuki World Rally Team	19	(France) Nicolas Bernardi	MON	SWE	NOR	MEX	POR	ARG	ITA	GRE	FIN	GER	NZL	ESP	FRA; 31	JPN	IRE		–	0	–	0
2007	Suzuki World Rally Team	19	(Finland) Sebastian Lindholm																GBR; 27	–	0	–	0
2008	Suzuki World Rally Team	11	(Finland) Toni Gardemeister	MON; Ret	SWE; 7	MEX; Ret	ARG; Ret	JOR; Ret	ITA; Ret	GRE; 9	TUR; Ret	FIN; 8	GER; 10	NZL; 7	ESP; 13	FRA; 13	JPN; 6	GBR; 7		13th	10	5th	34
2008	Suzuki World Rally Team	12	(Sweden) Per-Gunnar Andersson	MON; 8	SWE; Ret	MEX; Ret	ARG; 24	JOR; Ret	ITA; 9	GRE; 11	TUR; Ret	FIN; Ret	GER; 15	NZL; 6	ESP; 32	FRA; 17	JPN; 5	GBR; 5		12th	12	5th	34
