= World Rally Car =

FIA World Rally Championship car classification

A World Rally Car is a racing automobile built to the specific regulations set by the Fédération Internationale de l'Automobile (FIA) and designed for competition in the World Rally Championship (WRC). The cars were introduced in 1997 as a replacement for Group A regulations used in the manufacturers' championship, and were replaced by Group Rally1 in 2022.

== Regulations ==
=== 1997–2010 ===
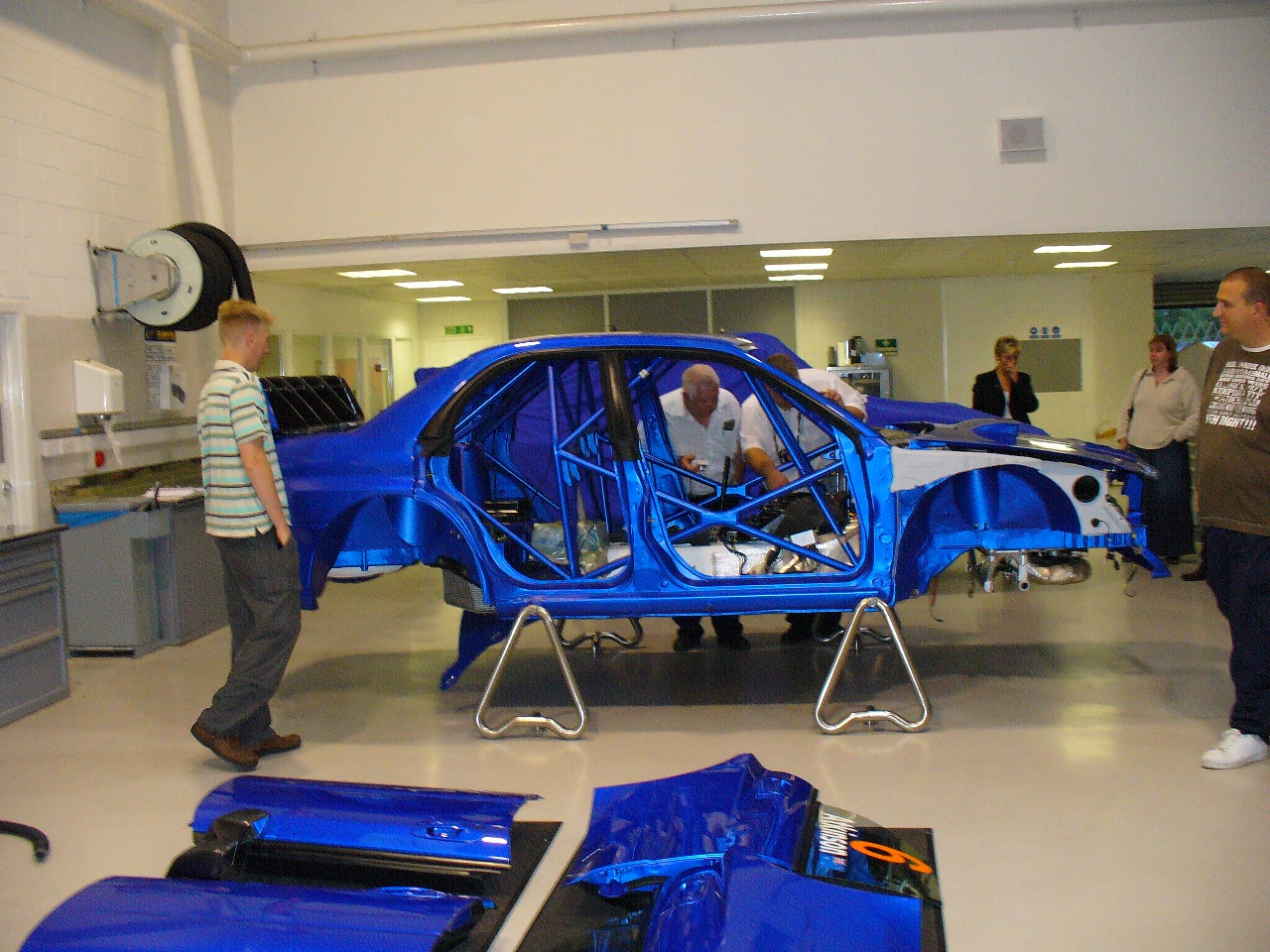
A Subaru Impreza WRC2006 being prepared by Prodrive

Between 1997 and 2010, the regulations mandated that World Rally Cars must have been built upon a production car with a minimum production run of 2500 units. A number of modifications could be made including increasing the engine displacement up to 2.0L, forced induction (including an anti-lag system), addition of four wheel drive, fitment of a sequential gearbox, modified suspension layout and attachment points, aerodynamic body modifications, weight reduction to a minimum of 1230 kg and chassis strengthening for greater rigidity. The maximum width was set at 1770 mm while front and rear tracks shouldn't exceed 1550 mm.

Unlike the requirements for the preceding Group A cars, manufacturers were no longer required to build "homologation specials" in order to meet approval. The base model did not need to have all the characteristics of the WRC car, as evidenced from cars such the Peugeot 206, 307, Citroën Xsara, and Škoda Fabia, which during this period had no road car variant with a turbocharged petrol engine or four-wheel-drive.

To limit power, all forced induction cars were fitted with a 34 mm diameter air restrictor before the turbocharger inlet, limiting the airflow to about 10 cubic meters per minute. The restriction was intended to limit power output to 220 kW (300 hp) although some WRC engines were believed to produce around 250–250 kW (330–340 hp). Engine development did not focus on peak power output but towards producing a very wide powerband (or power curve). Typically, power output in excess of 220 kW (300 hp) was available from 3000 rpm to the 7500 rpm maximum, with a peak of 250–250 kW (330–340 hp) at around 5500 rpm. At 2000 rpm (the engine idle speed in "stage" mode) power output was slightly above 150 kW (200 hp).

By 2004, the best cars had ABS, electronic clutch control, paddle-shift, traction control, three active differentials, ride height control with GPS, electronic dampers and active suspension.

For 2005 the maximum width of the WRC cars was increased from 1770 mm to 1800 mm.

In an attempt to cut costs, since 2006 new regulations required mechanical front and rear differentials, while the central differential remained active. Active suspension and water injections were also prohibited. Cars entered by a manufacturer had to be equipped with the same engine for two rallies; further limitations were imposed on the changing of some parts, including suspension, steering, turbochargers, and gearboxes.

=== 2011–2016 ===
Starting in 2011, rules for WRC cars changed to be more restrictive. New regulations were derived from Super 2000 cars with a different aerodynamic kit. The cars could be smaller models (there was no longer a minimum 4 m length) and include a custom-build or production 1600 cm^{3} direct injection turbo-charged global race engine with a 33 mm (1.3 in) diameter air restrictor and a maximum boost pressure of 2.5 bar (36 psi) absolute. This limited torque to about 400 N⋅m (300 lb⋅ft) or less.

Exotic materials (titanium, magnesium, ceramics and composite) were forbidden except when present in the base model. Carbon fibre and aramid fibre were very restricted ("only one layer of fabric is used and is affixed to the visible face of the part"), except for bodywork's side protections where multiple layers of aramid fibre were allowed.

The gear changes must be made with a mechanical linkage system, so paddle-shifters were outlawed. However the system was re-allowed in 2015. There was no center differential (earlier it used to be 3 differentials, with a center/3rd differential included), but the new regulation allows the only front and rear axle differential and a mechanical clutch to disconnect the rear axle during handbrake use (to reduce cost and make the cars' driving style more exciting again for both spectators and TV broadcasts). These two differentials must be mechanical, without electronic control or hydraulic or viscous systems (from 2006 to 2010 the center differential and previously all three could be active).

The minimum weight was 1200 kg empty and 1350 kg (1360 kg from 2013) with driver and co-driver (in both cases when measured with only one spare wheel).

=== 2017–2021 ===
The 1.6 L turbo-charged global race engine was retained in the 2017 World Rally Car regulations, but the turbo restrictor diameter was increased from 33 mm to 36 mm, increasing the engine's power output from 230 to 280 kW (310 to 380 hp). The minimum empty vehicle weight was decreased by 10 kg but the combined vehicle, crew and spare wheel weight remained at 1360 kg.

Manufacturers were given more freedom to maximise aerodynamic performance, including large brake cooling ducts in fairings forming enlarged wheel arches. Electronically controlled active centre differentials were permitted, while the front and rear differentials remain mechanical.

While 2011 specification World Rally Cars were allowed to compete in 2017, the new World Rally Cars were allowed for use by manufacturers' teams only.

== Cars ==
Manufacturer	Car	From	To
(France) Citroën	Citroën Xsara WRC	2001	2006
(France) Citroën	Citroën C4 WRC	2007	2010
(France) Citroën	Citroën DS3 WRC	2011	2016
(France) Citroën	Citroën C3 WRC	2017	2019
(United Kingdom) Ford Motor Company	Ford Escort WRC	1997	1998
(United Kingdom) Ford Motor Company	Ford Focus RS WRC	1999	2010
(United Kingdom) Ford Motor Company	Ford Fiesta RS WRC	2011	2016
(United Kingdom) Ford Motor Company	Ford Fiesta WRC	2017	2021
(South Korea) Hyundai Motor Company	Hyundai Accent WRC	2000	2003
(South Korea) Hyundai Motor Company	Hyundai i20 WRC	2014	2016
(South Korea) Hyundai Motor Company	Hyundai i20 Coupe WRC	2017	2021
(Germany) BMW	MINI John Cooper Works WRC	2011	2012
(Japan) Mitsubishi Motors	Mitsubishi Lancer WRC	2001	2002
(Japan) Mitsubishi Motors	Mitsubishi Lancer WRC	2004	2005
(France) Peugeot	Peugeot 206 WRC	1999	2003
(France) Peugeot	Peugeot 307 WRC	2004	2005
(Spain) SEAT	SEAT Córdoba WRC	1998	2000
(Czech Republic) Škoda Auto	Škoda Octavia WRC	1999	2003
(Czech Republic) Škoda Auto	Škoda Fabia WRC	2003	2005
(Japan) Subaru	Subaru Impreza WRC	1997	2008
(Japan) Suzuki	Suzuki SX4 WRC	2007	2008
(Japan) Toyota	Toyota Corolla WRC	1997	1999
(Japan) Toyota	Toyota Yaris WRC	2017	2021
(Germany) Volkswagen	Volkswagen Polo R WRC	2013	2016
Sources: Homologations Lists (various years) published by FIA; eWRC-results.com

== Gallery ==
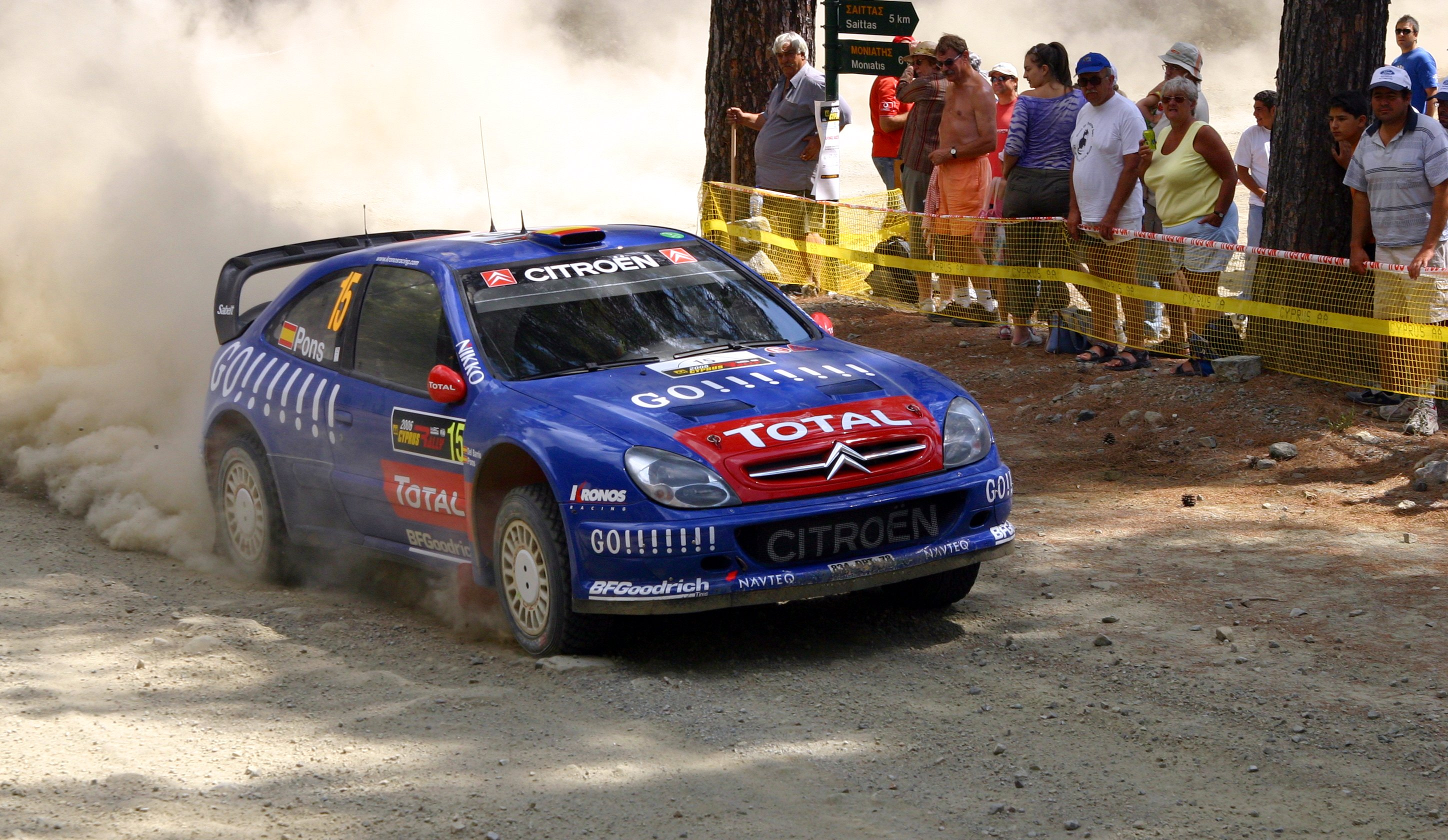
Citroën Xsara WRC

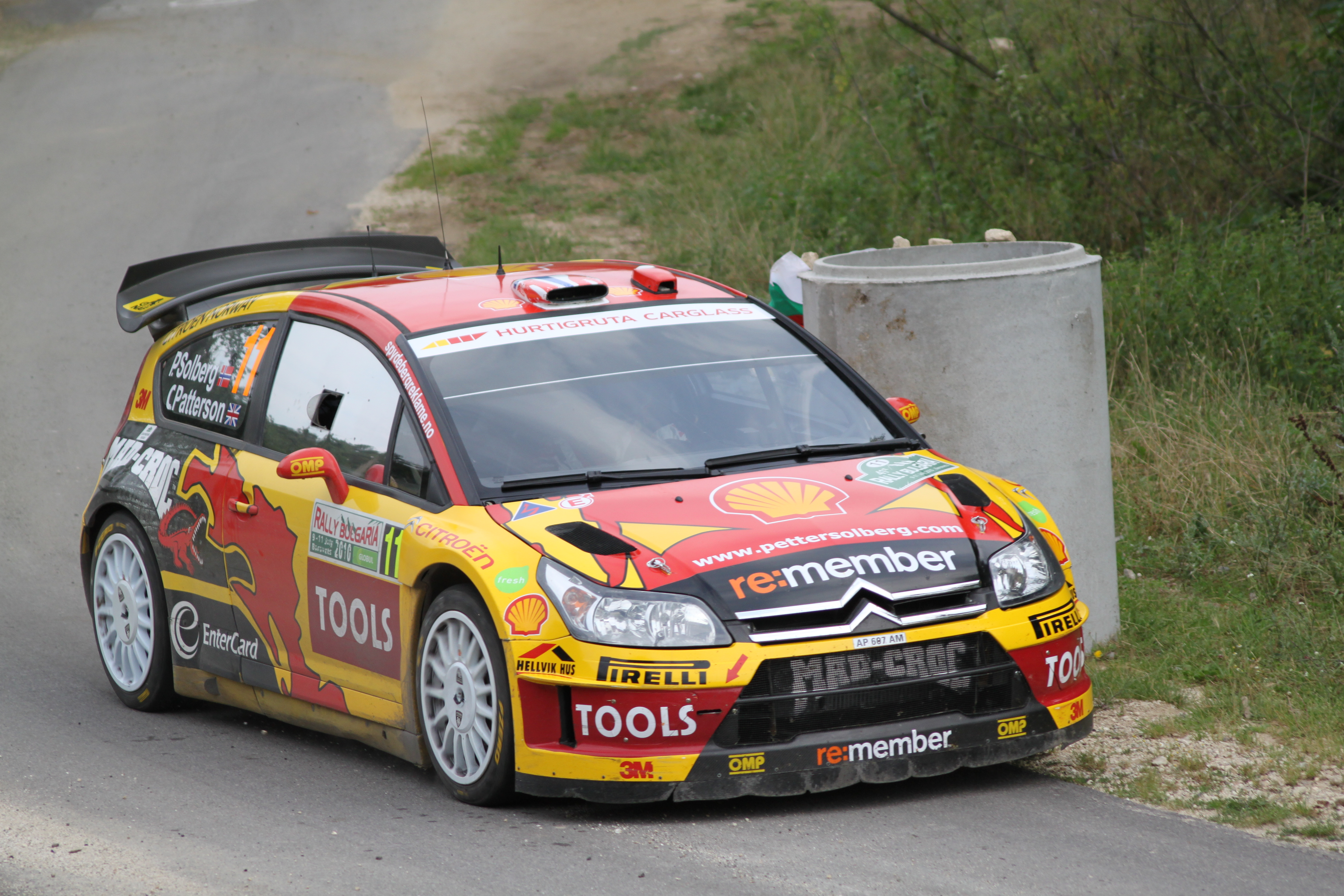
Citroën C4 WRC

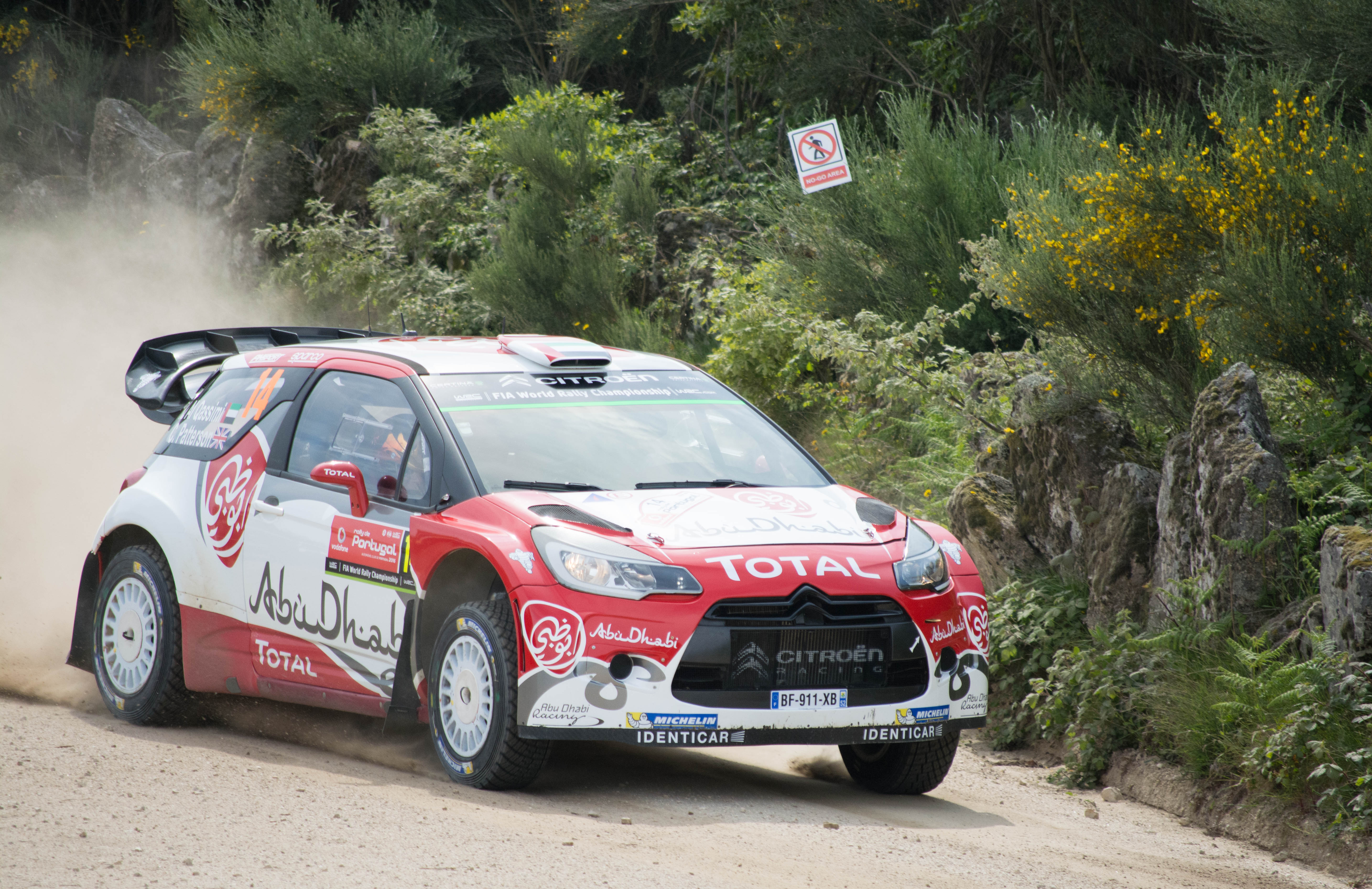
Citroën DS3 WRC

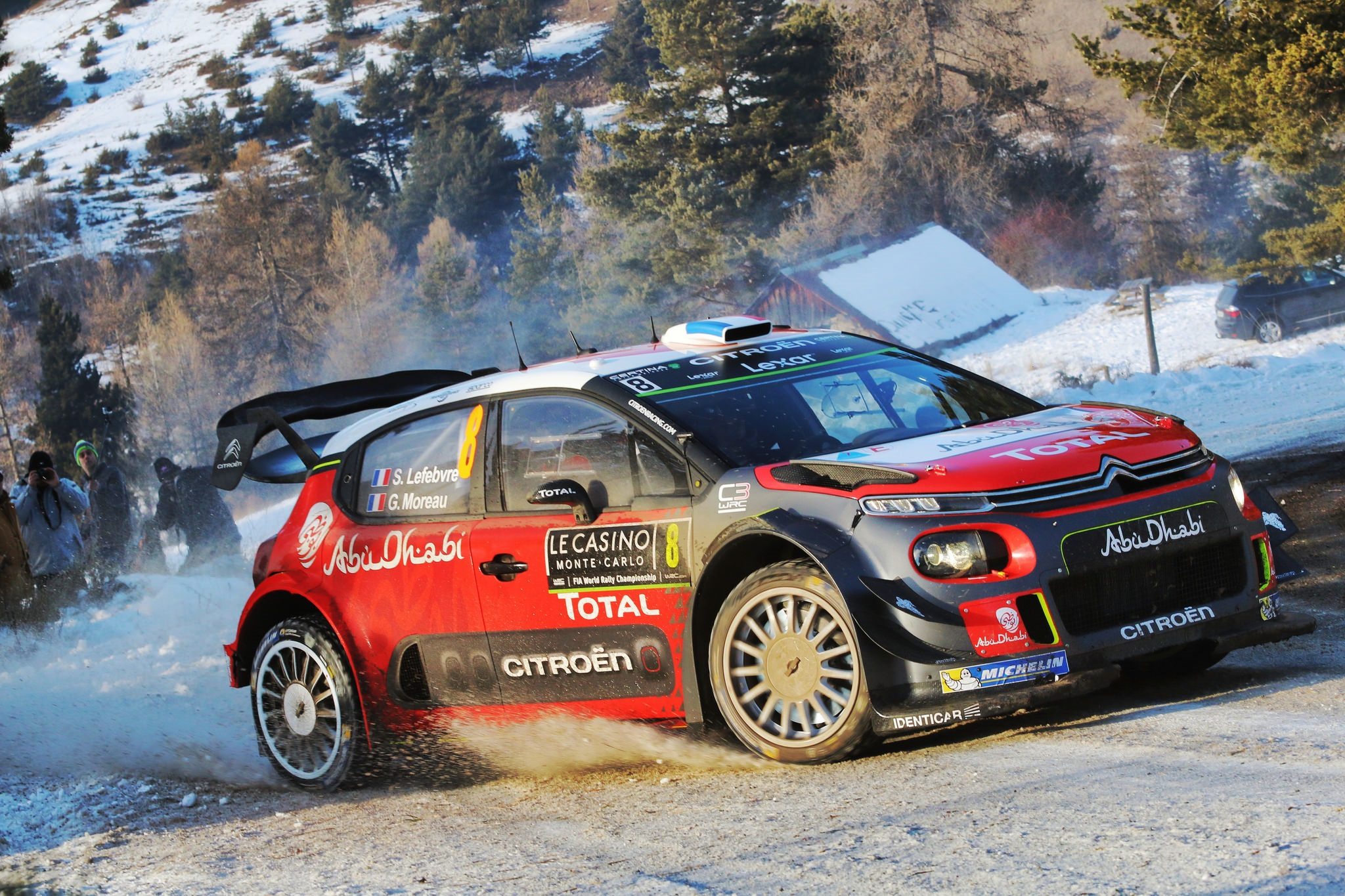
Citroën C3 WRC

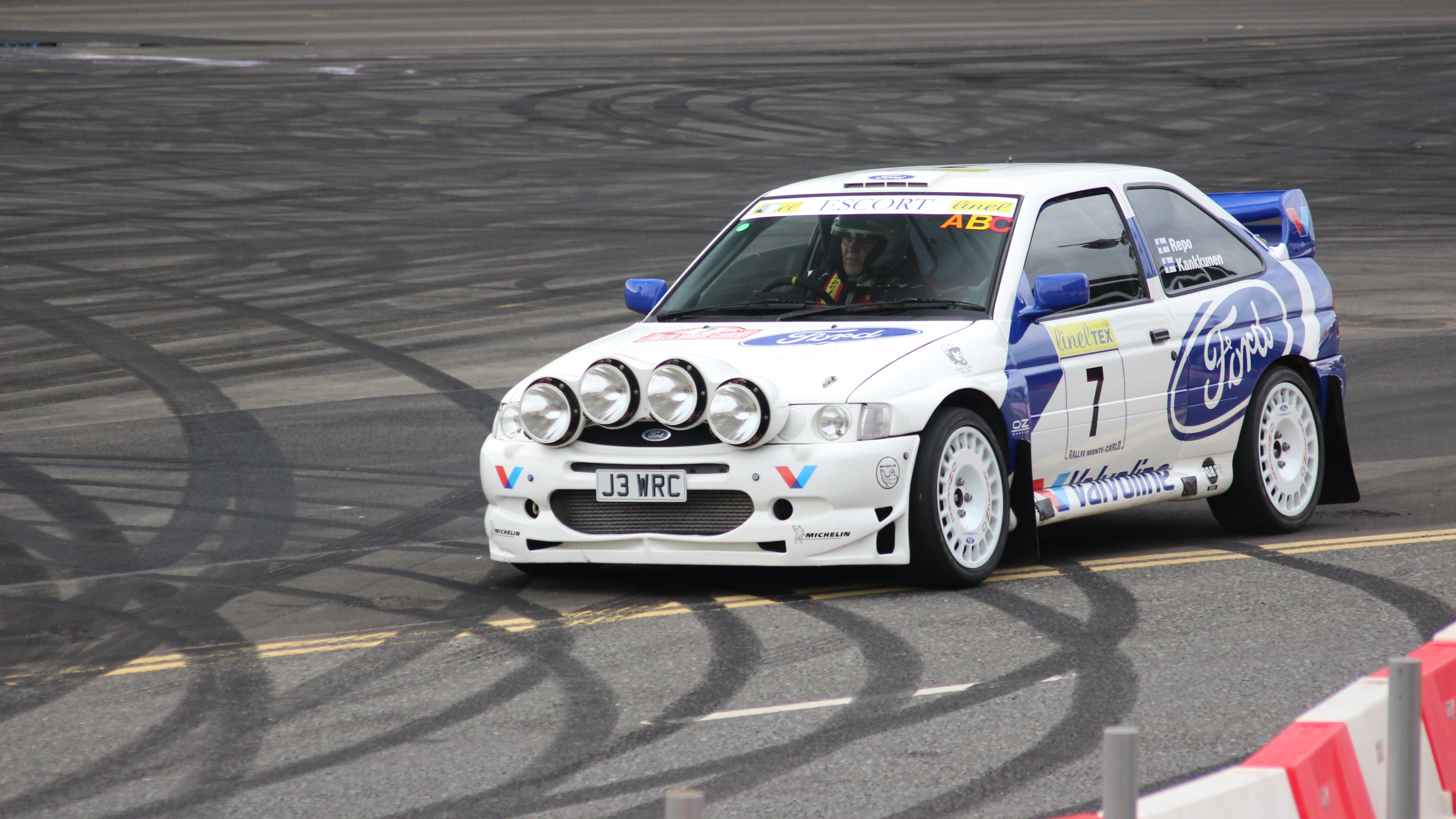
Ford Escort WRC

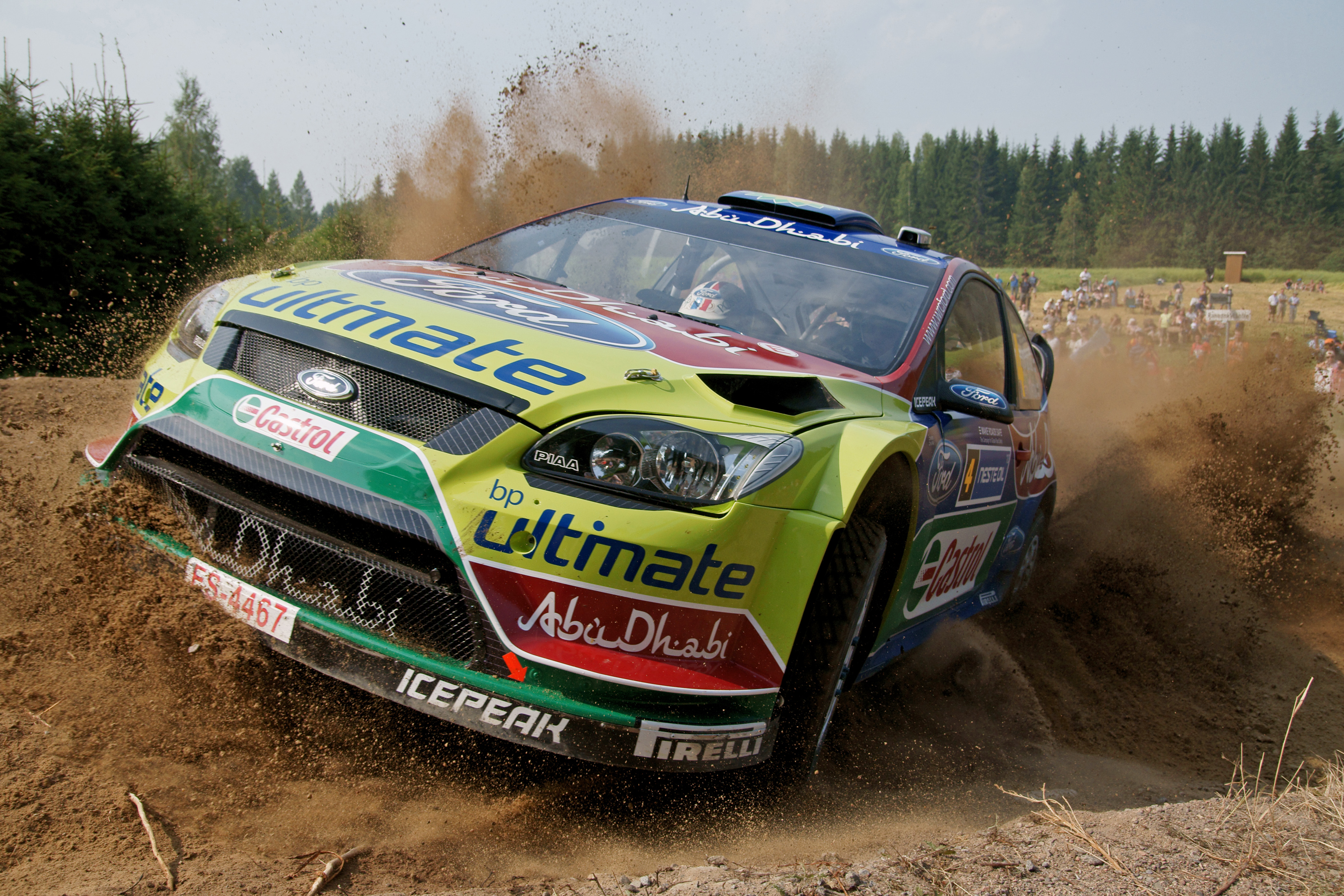
Ford Focus RS WRC

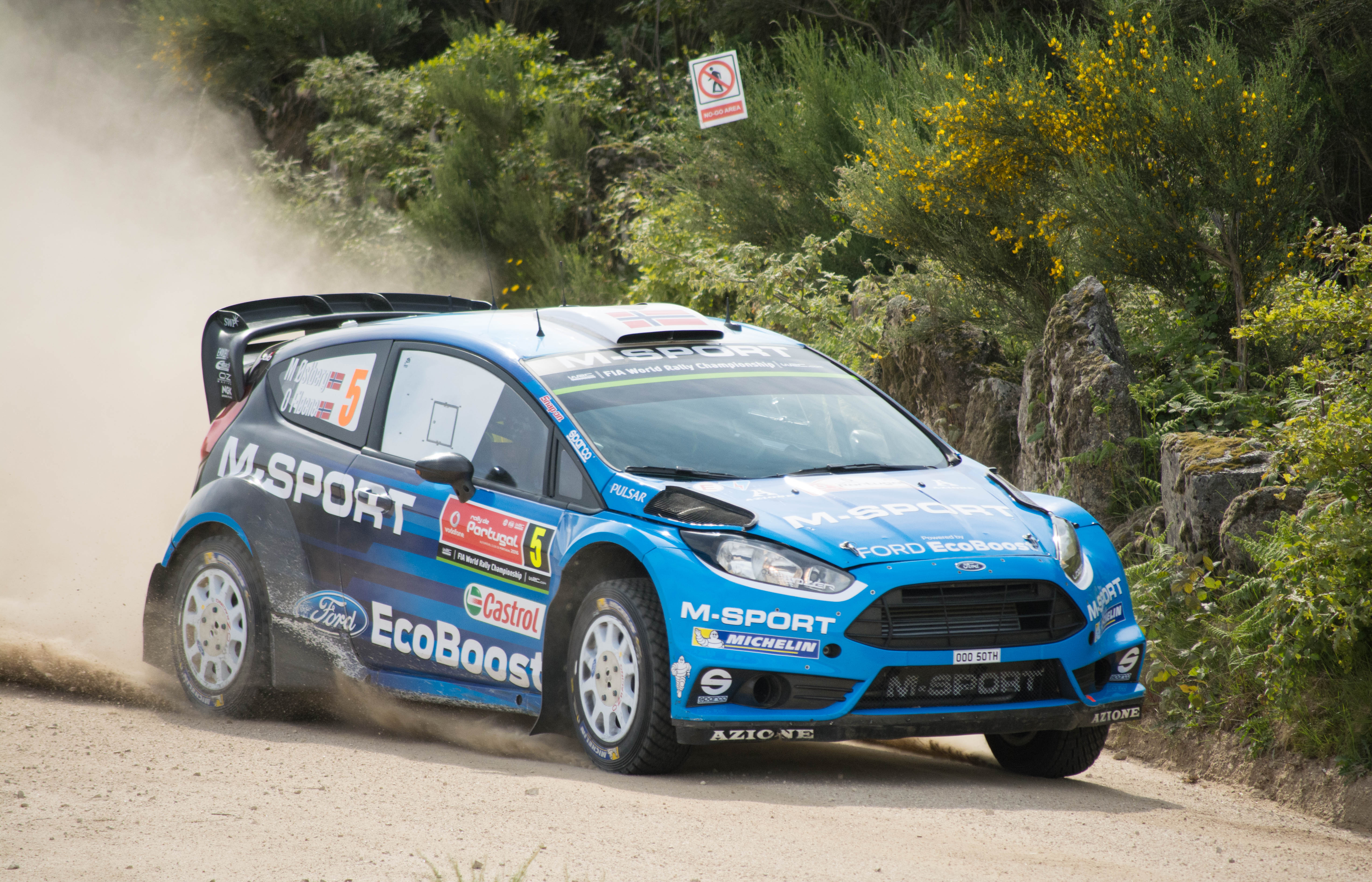
Ford Fiesta RS WRC

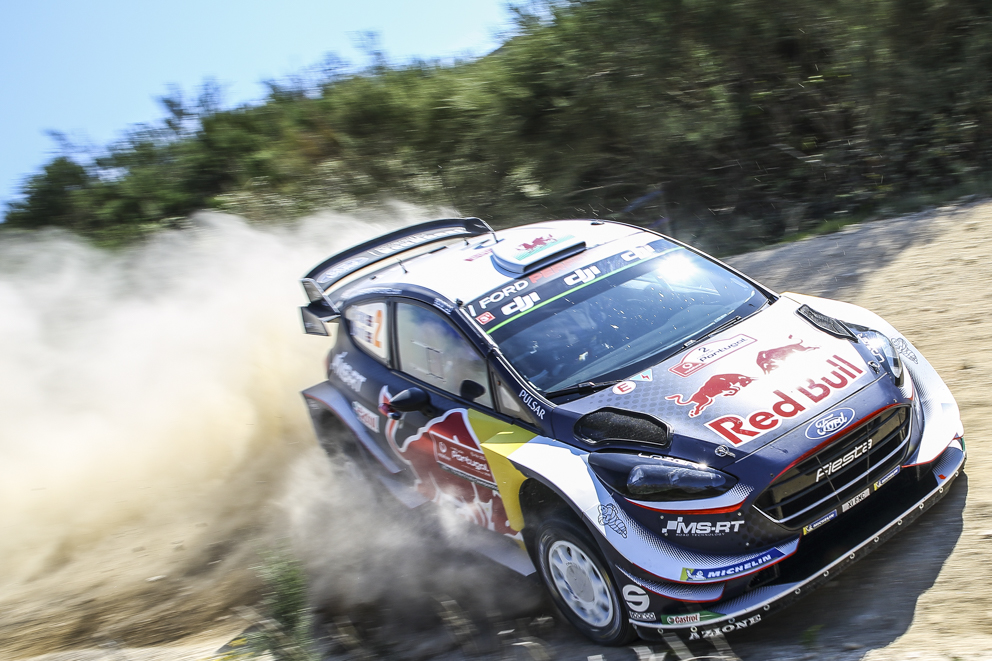
Ford Fiesta WRC

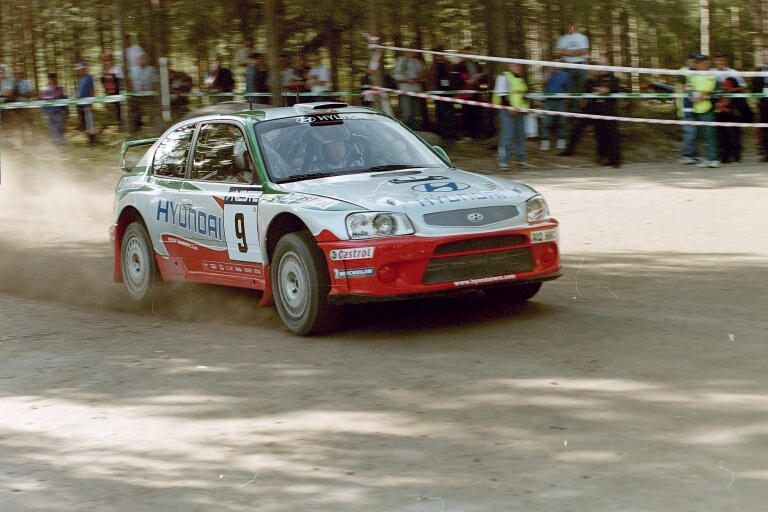
Hyundai Accent WRC

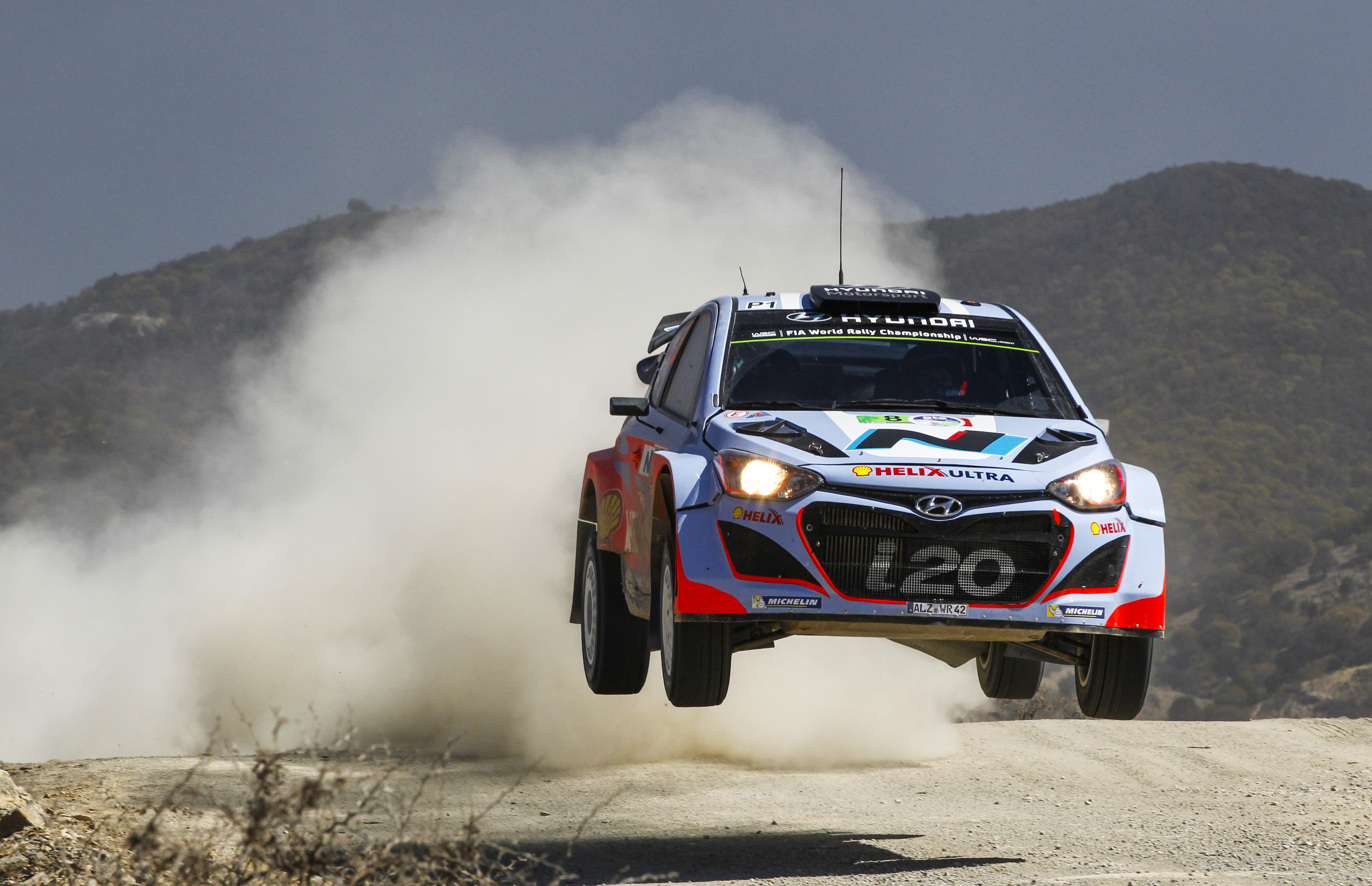
Hyundai i20 WRC

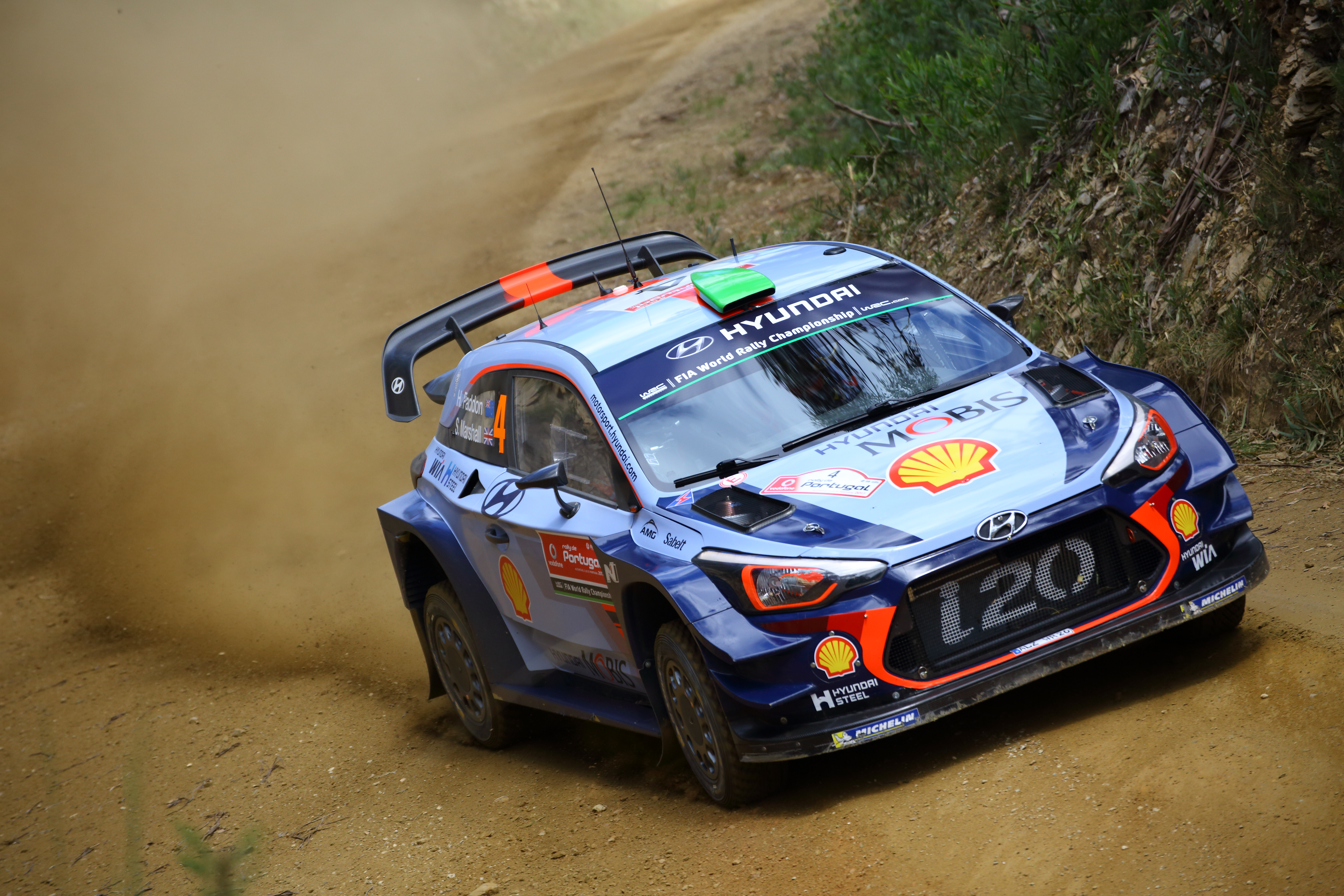
Hyundai i20 Coupe WRC

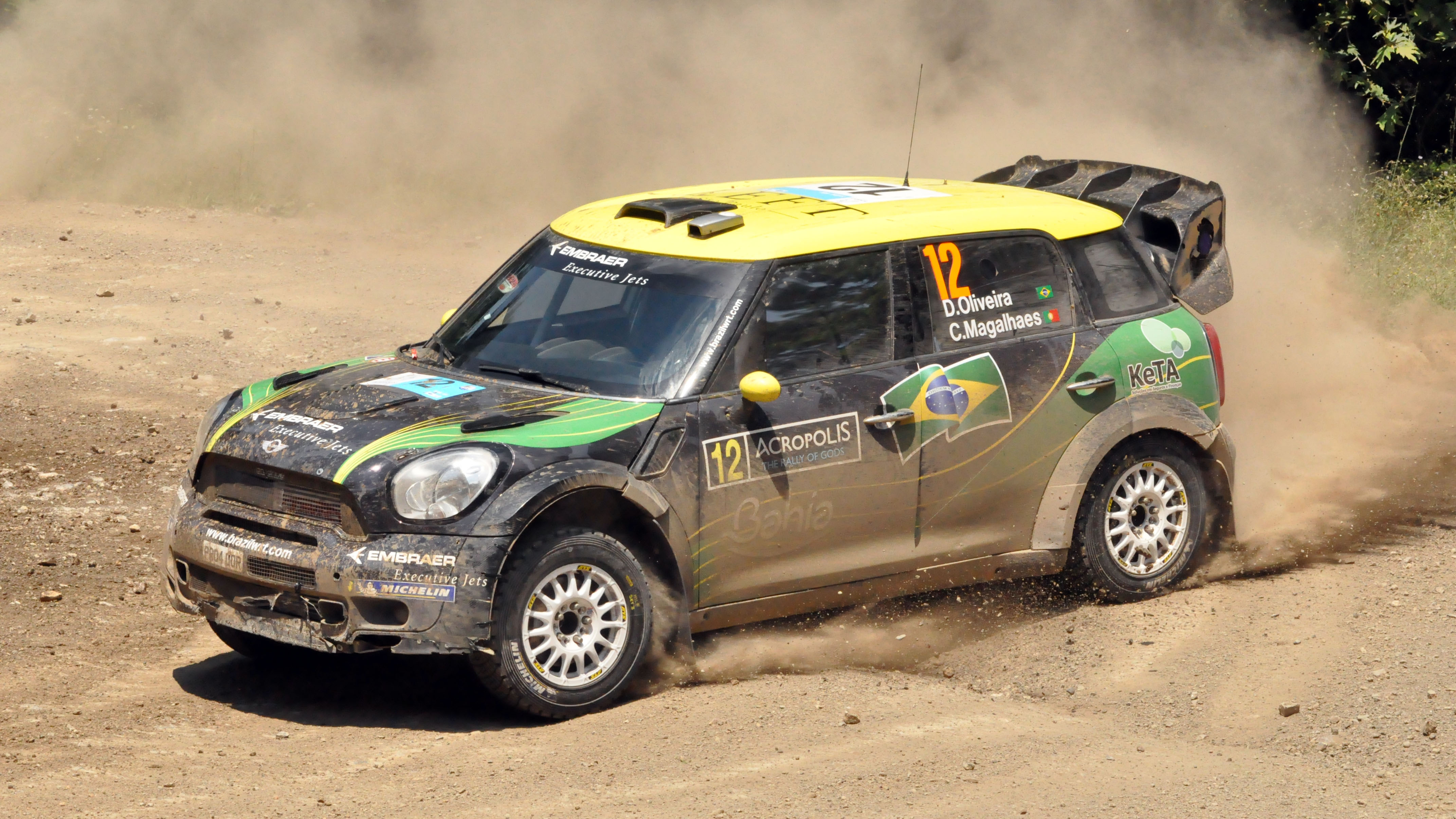
Mini John Cooper Works WRC

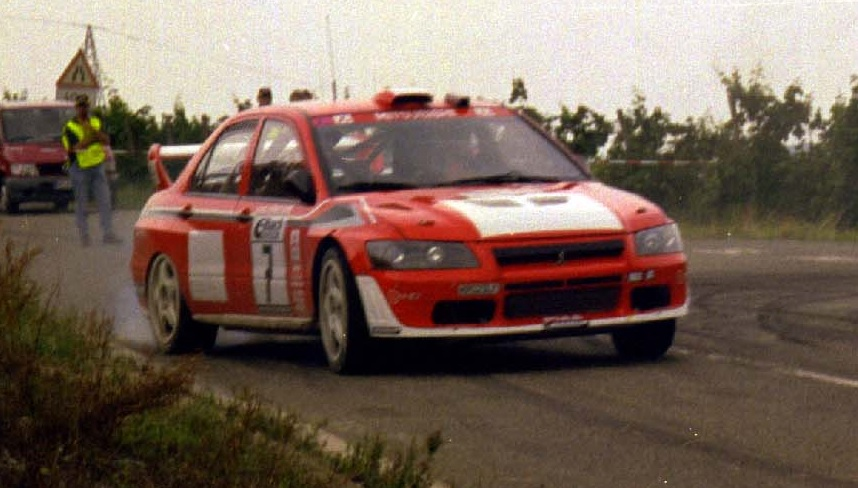
Mitsubishi Lancer Evolution WRC

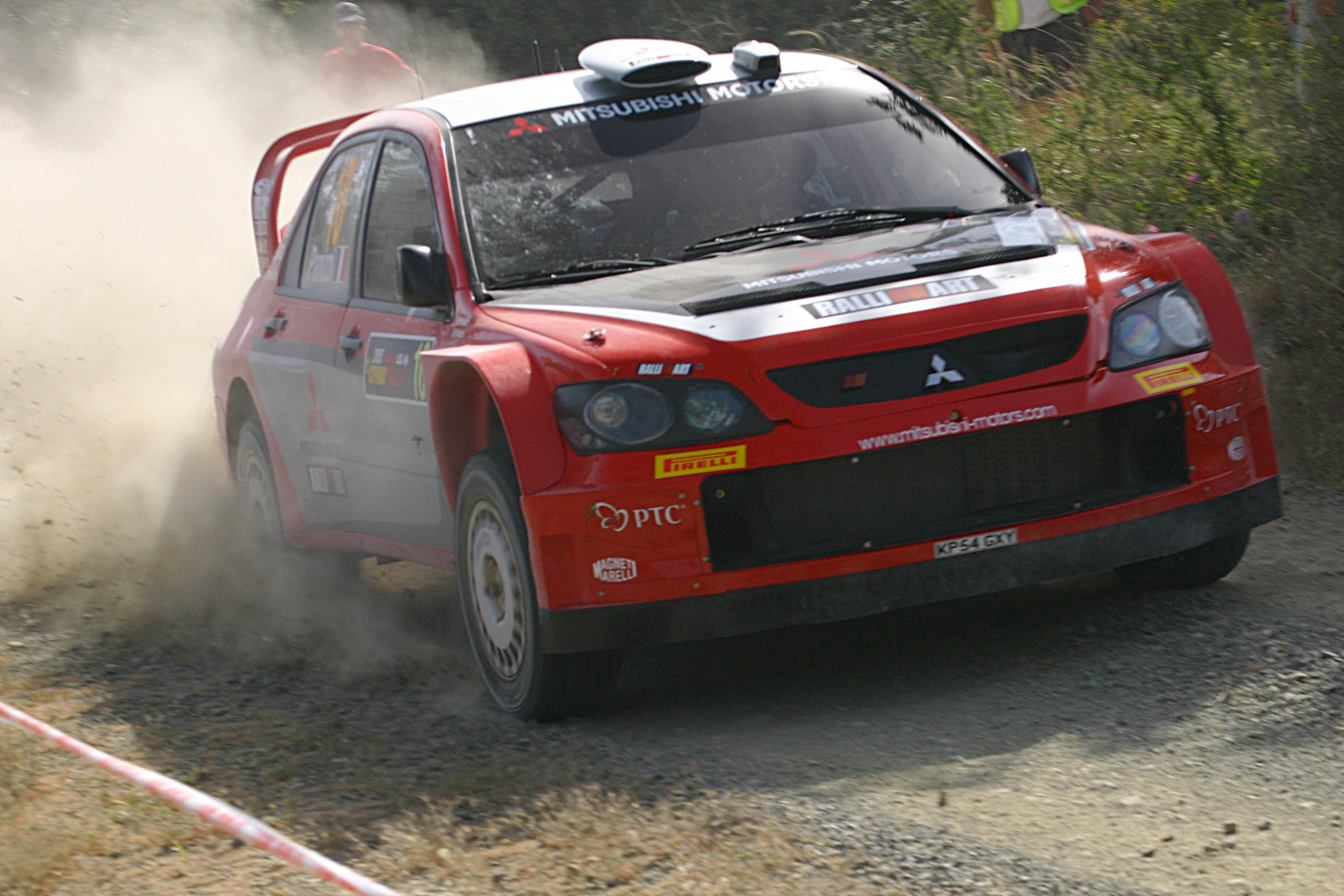
Mitsubishi Lancer WRC

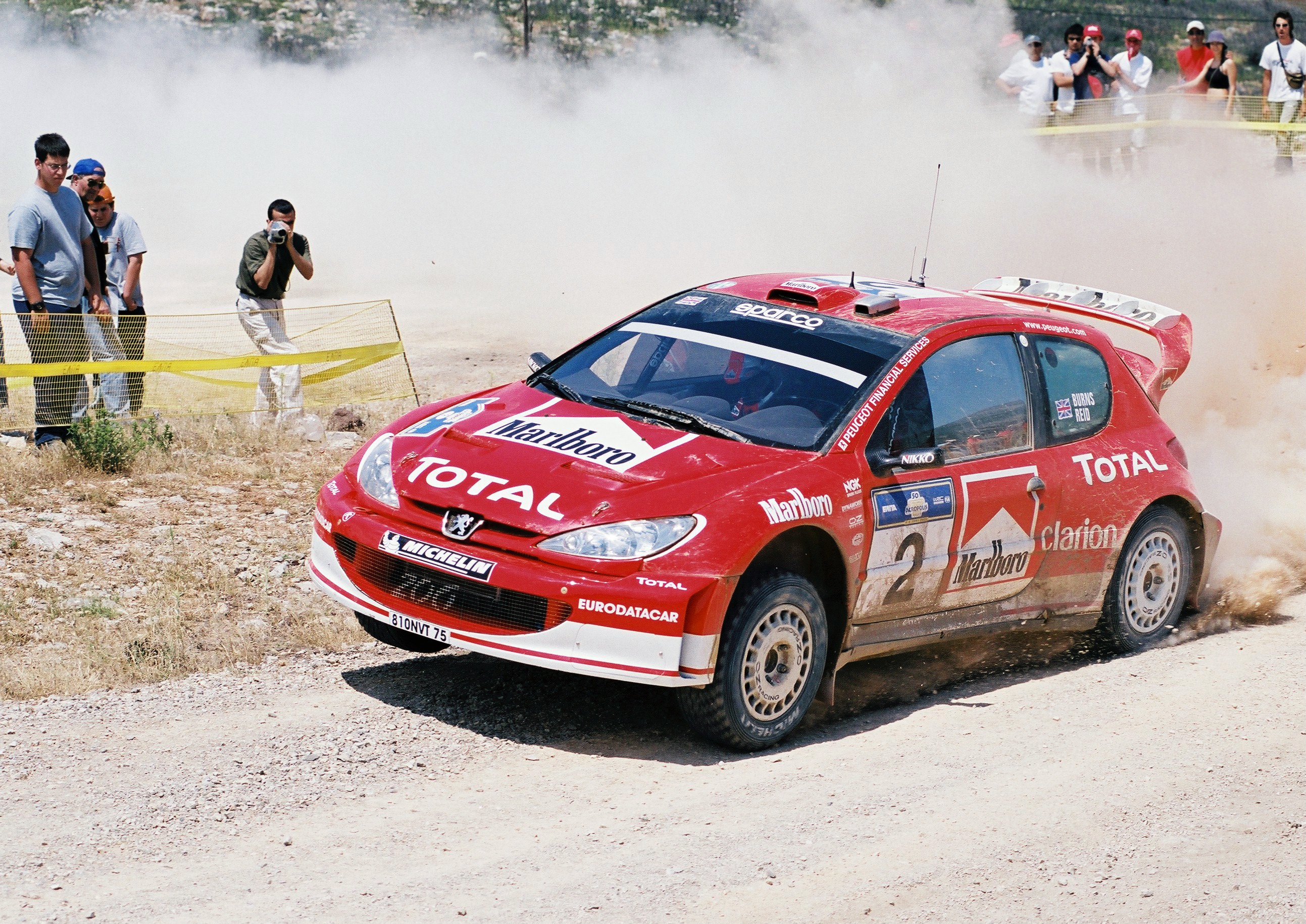
Peugeot 206 WRC

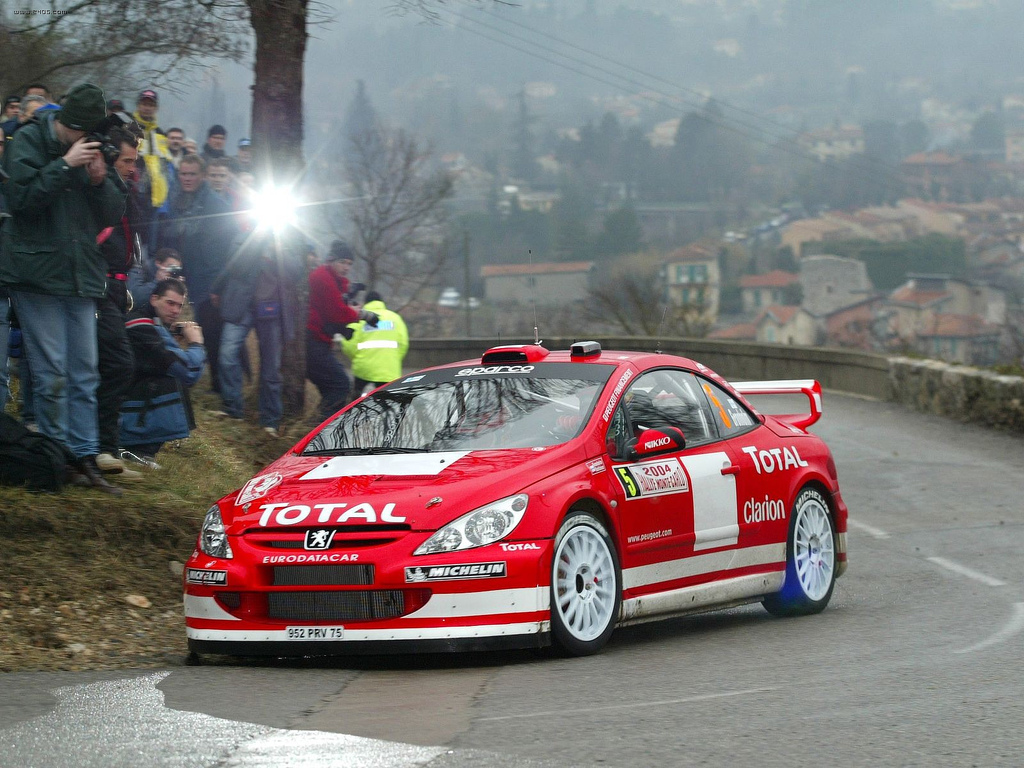
Peugeot 307 WRC

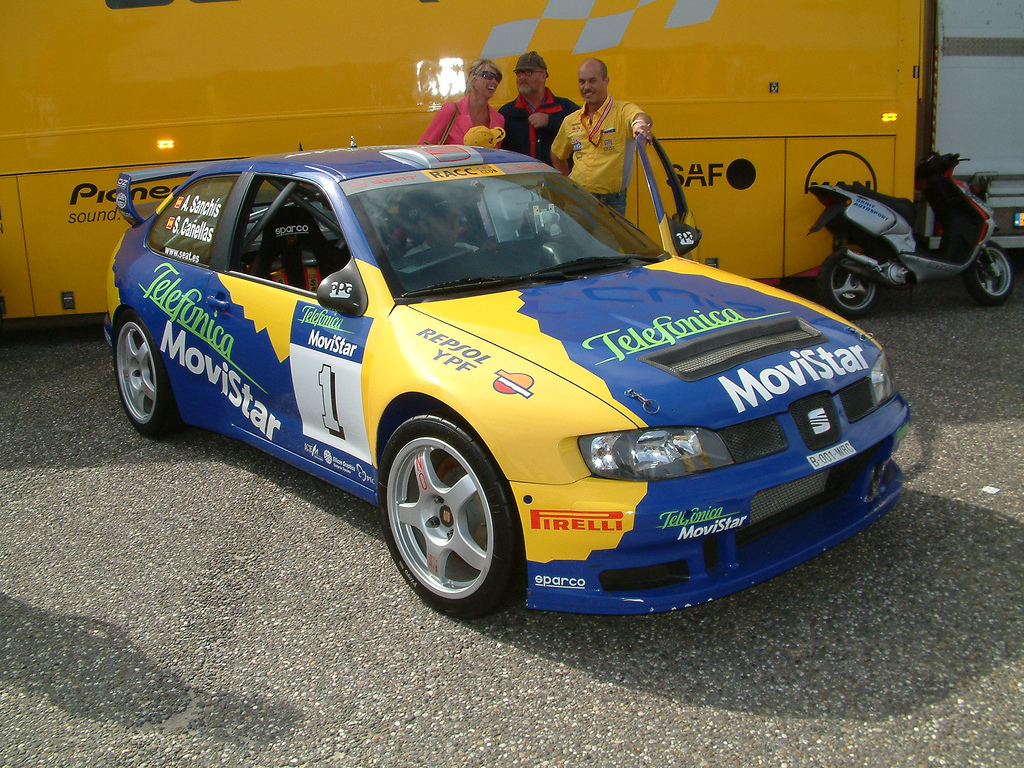
SEAT Córdoba WRC

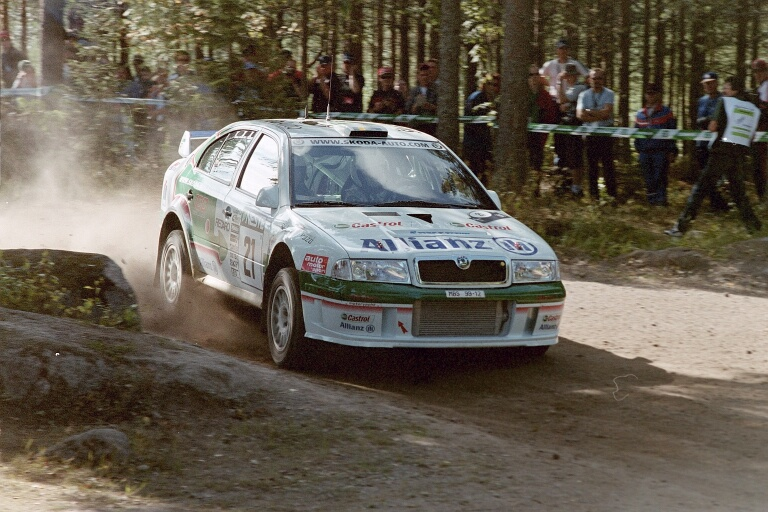
Škoda Octavia WRC

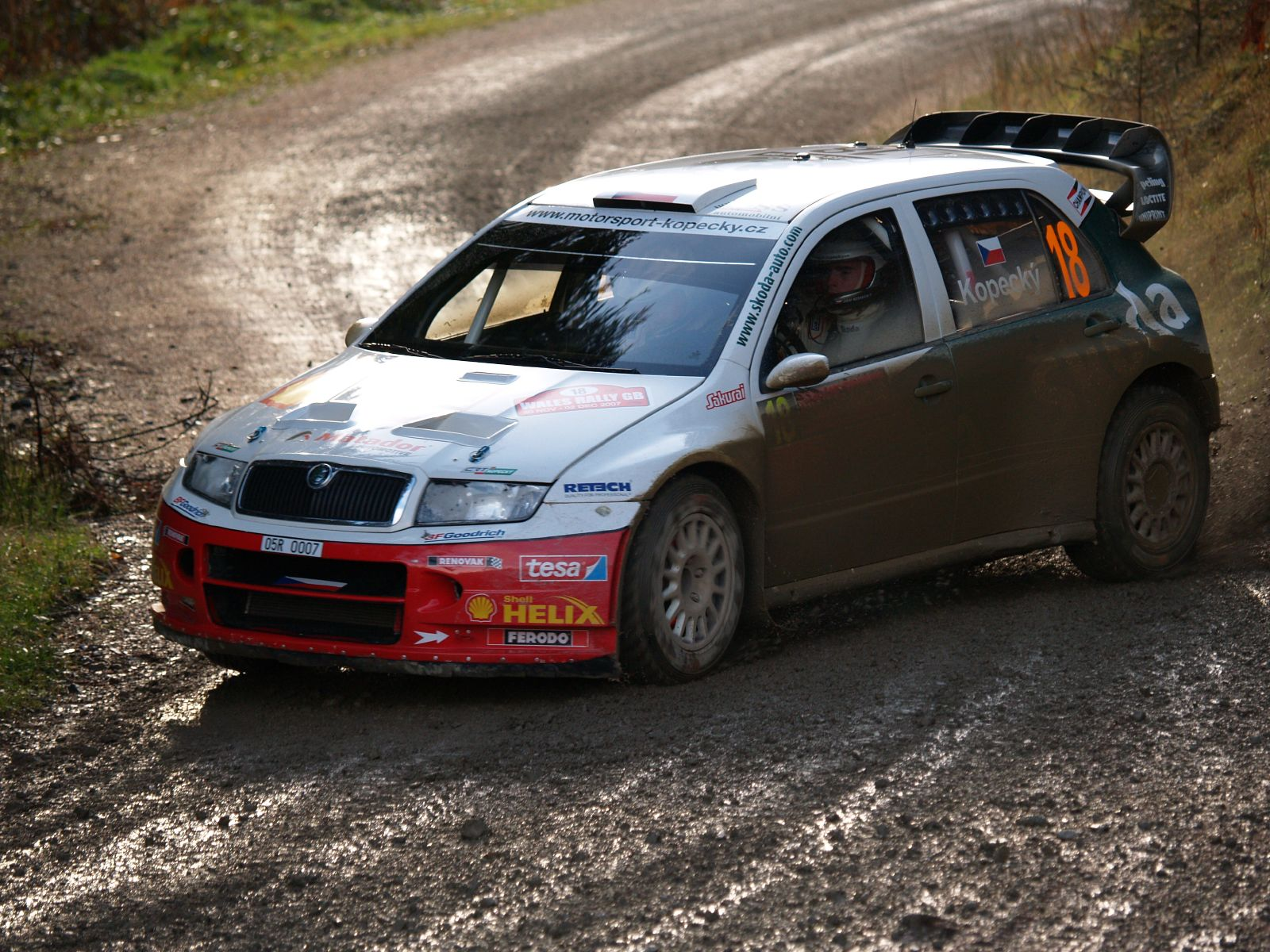
Škoda Fabia WRC

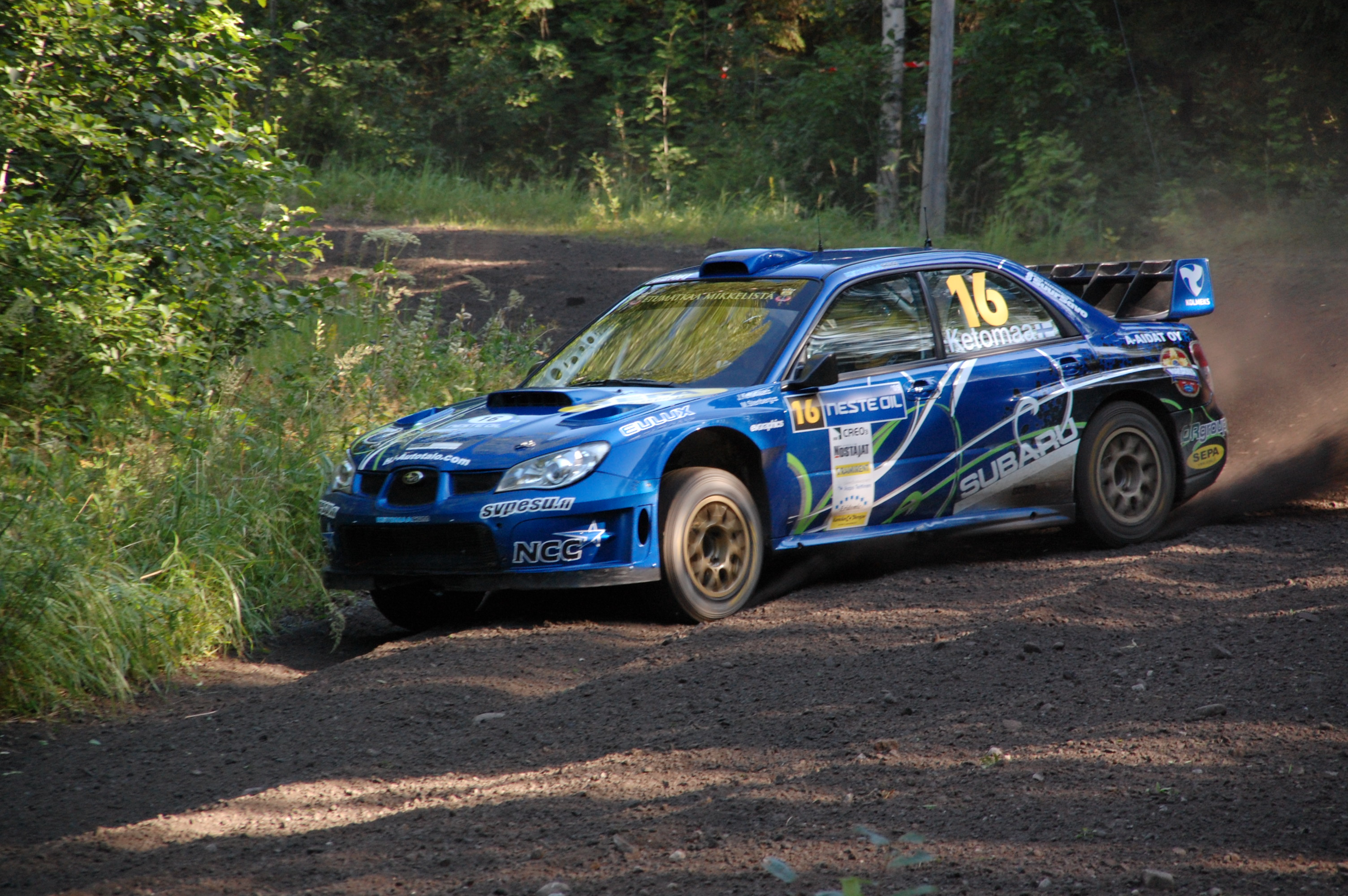
Subaru Impreza WRC

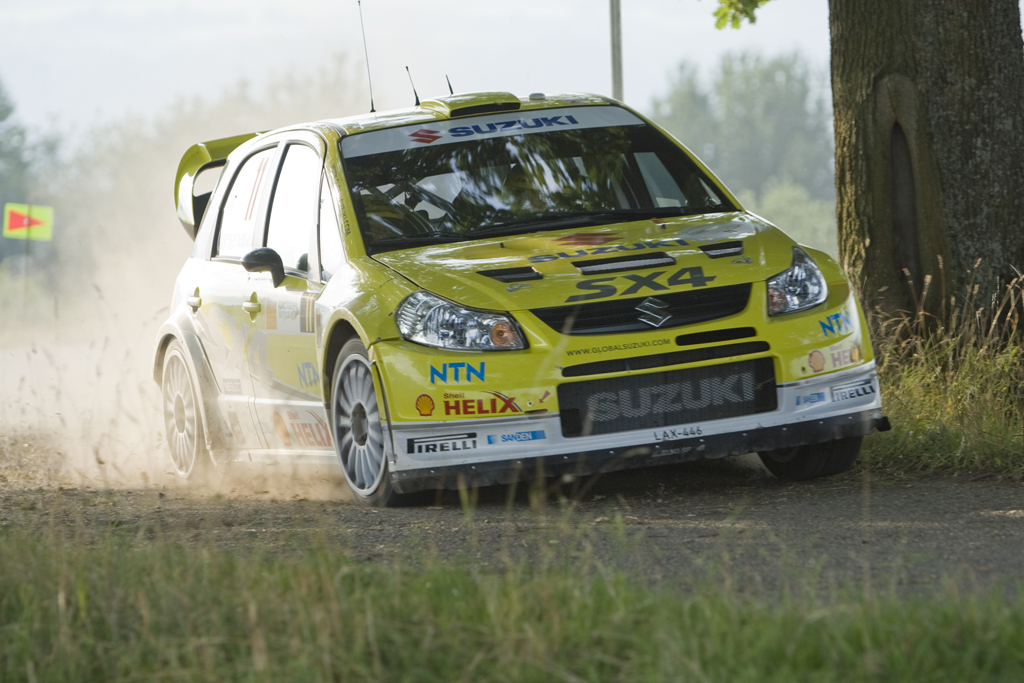
Suzuki SX4 WRC

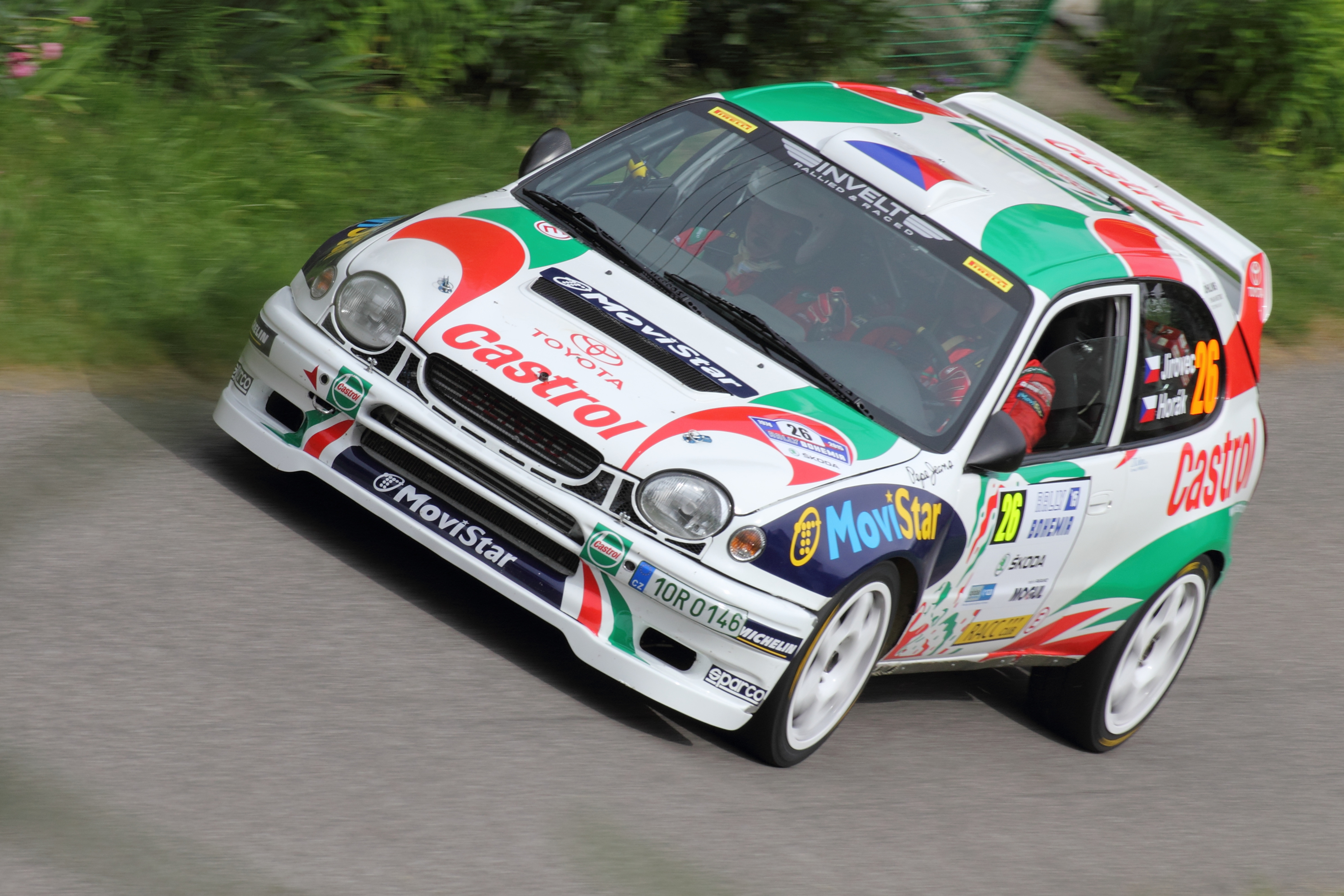
Toyota Corolla WRC

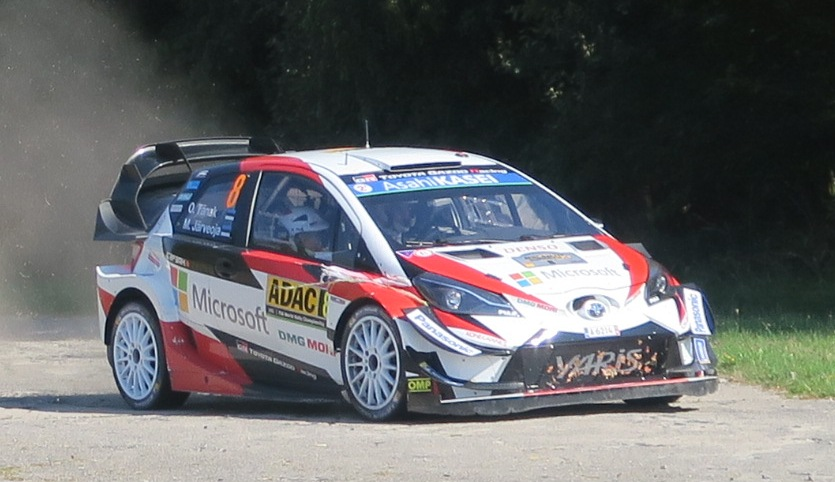
Toyota Yaris WRC

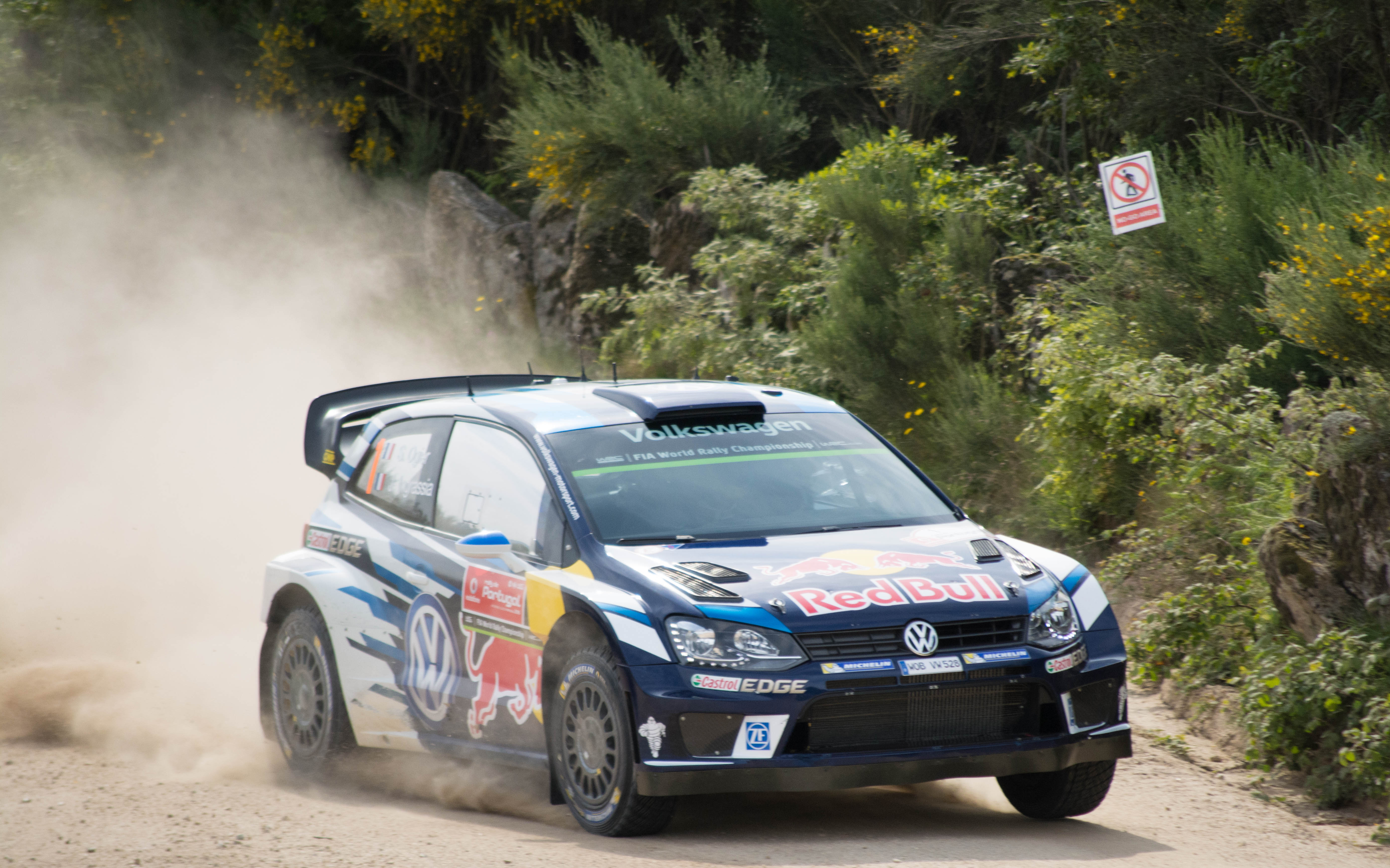
Volkswagen Polo R WRC
