= Suzuki J engine =

Suzuki automobile engine

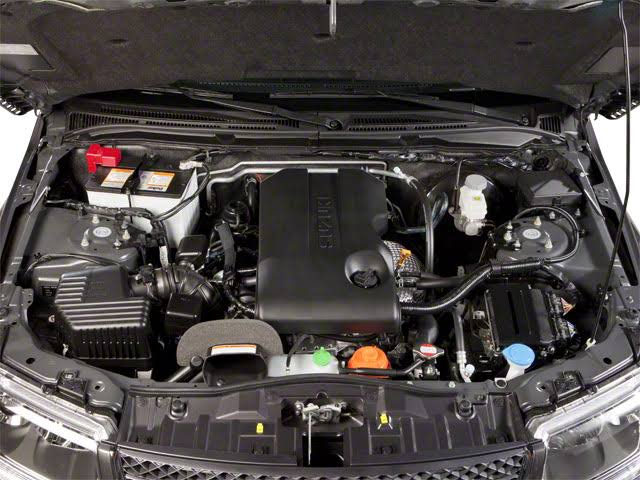
- Suzuki J24B Engine

Overview
- Manufacturer: Suzuki
- Production: 1996-2019

Layout
- Configuration: Straight-four engine
- Displacement: 1,839 cc (1.8 L); 1,995 cc (2.0 L); 2,290 cc (2.3 L); 2,393 cc (2.4 L)
- Cylinder bore: 84.0 mm (3.31 in); 90.0 mm (3.54 in); 92.0 mm (3.62 in)
- Piston stroke: 83.0 mm (3.27 in); 90.0 mm (3.54 in)
- Cylinder block material: Aluminium
- Cylinder head material: Aluminium
- Valvetrain: DOHC 4 valves per cylinder with VVT (on J20A, J20B and J24B)
- Valvetrain drive system: Chain
- Compression ratio: 9.7:1, 9.8:1, 10.0:1

Combustion
- Fuel system: Multi-port fuel injection
- Fuel type: Petrol
- Oil system: Wet sump
- Cooling system: Water-cooled

Output
- Power output: 120–178 PS (88–131 kW; 118–176 hp)
- Torque output: 152–230 N⋅m (112–170 lb⋅ft; 15–23 kg⋅m)

The Suzuki J engine family is a series of all aluminium inline-four cylinder engine from Suzuki, first introduced in February 1996. The displacement ranges from 1.8 to 2.4 litres. It features dual overhead cams, 16 valves in total, multi-port fuel injection, and variable valve timing in later models. The J engine was Suzuki's 'big block' series engine. To keep development costs down, it had a significant parts and design commonality with the H family of V6 engines: aluminum block and cast iron sleeve structure, and valve train chain drive.

== J18A ==
Suzuki J18A is a 1.8 L (1,839 cc) inline-four naturally aspirated petrol engine from the Suzuki J-family. It produces 135 PS (99 kW; 133 hp) at 6,500 rpm and 157 N⋅m (116 lb⋅ft) of torque at 3,000 rpm in Japanese specifications, 121 PS (89 kW; 119 hp) and 152 N⋅m (112 lb⋅ft) of torque in European trim.

The Suzuki J18A engine features an aluminum cylinder block and cylinder head with dual overhead cams and four valves per cylinder (16 in total). Cylinder bore and piston stroke are 84.0 and 83.0 mm (3.31 and 3.27 in), respectively. Compression ratio rating is 9.8:1. The first of the J series engines, it became available on the Crescent Wagon in February 1996.

The Suzuki J18A engine is equipped with multi-port fuel injection and electronic ignition system with individual ignition coil for each spark plug. It was designed to be as light as possible and weighs in at 85 kg (187 lb).

It was produced in the following vehicles:

- Suzuki Cultus Crescent/Baleno/Esteem (1996-2002)
- Suzuki Sidekick (1996-1998, North America only)

== J20 ==
The J20 is the first version of the J20 series. It is a 2.0 L (1,995 cc) engine with an aluminum engine block and cylinder head with bore and stroke: 84.0 mm × 90.0 mm (3.31 in × 3.54 in). It had dual overhead cams and multi-port fuel injection with a 9.7:1 compression ratio. Unlike its successor, it did not have variable valve timing. It produces 130 PS (96 kW; 128 hp) at 6,000 rpm and 182 N⋅m (134 lb⋅ft) of torque at 3,000 rpm.

It was installed only in the following vehicle:

- Suzuki Vitara (1998-2005)

== J20A ==
The Suzuki J20A is a 2.0 L (1,995 cc) inline-four natural aspirated gasoline engine with a 84.0 mm (3.31 in) cylinder bore and 90.0 mm (3.54 in) piston stroke. from the Suzuki J family. It features an aluminum cylinder block and aluminum cylinder head with dual overhead cams and four valves per cylinder. Compression ratio rating is 9.7:1. The J20A engine produced 130 to 143 PS (96 to 105 kW; 128 to 141 hp) and 182 to 186 N⋅m (134 to 137 lb⋅ft) of torque depending on model and variant.

The Suzuki J20A engine is equipped with multi-port fuel injection, variable Valve Timing system on the intake side, Electronic Throttle Control System and electronic ignition system with individual ignition coil for each spark plug. A turbocharged, competition version of this engine, producing 320 PS (235 kW) from 4,000 to 5,000 rpm and 65 kg⋅m (637 N⋅m; 470 lb⋅ft) of torque at 3,000 rpm, was developed for Suzuki's shortlived SX4 WRC contender.

The J20A was installed in the following vehicles:

- Suzuki Grand Vitara (2005-2012)
- Suzuki Aerio (2001-2004)
- Suzuki SX4 (2006-2009)
- Suzuki Vitara (2001-2005)

== J20B ==
The Suzuki J20B is a 2.0 L (1,995 cc) inline-four natural aspirated gasoline engine from the Suzuki J-family. It is almost identical to the J20A, though changeability is limited between the two engines. The cylinder head is slightly different and it featured more aggressive camshafts, better variable valve timing actuation, and a different bellhouse. The J20B engine produces 145 to 150 PS (107 to 110 kW; 143 to 148 hp) and 190 N⋅m (140 lb⋅ft) of torque.

It was offered only in the following vehicle:

- Suzuki SX4 (2010-2014)

== J23 ==
The Suzuki J23 engine is a 2.3 L (2,290 cc) inline-four natural aspirated gasoline engine from the Suzuki J family. The J23 engine produces 155 hp (116 kW; 157 PS) and 152 lb⋅ft (206 N⋅m) of torque. The J23 was only ever offered in North America, and only on the Suzuki Aerio.

It is an aluminum engine block and cylinder head with bore and stroke of 90.0 mm × 90.0 mm (3.54 in × 3.54 in). It had dual overhead cams and Multi-port fuel injection with a 9.7:1 compression ratio. It is based on a J20 block but with a bigger bore; the two engines have the same crankshafts and connecting rods. The engine did not feature variable valve timing.

It was produced in the following vehicle only:

- Suzuki Aerio (2004-2007)

== J24B ==
The Suzuki J24B is a 2.4 L (2,393 cc) inline-four natural aspirated gasoline engine from the Suzuki J-family. It is the final iteration of the J-engine. The J24B engine produces 166 PS (122 kW; 164 hp) at 6,000 rpm and 225 N⋅m (22.9 kg⋅m; 166 lb⋅ft) at 4,000 rpm when installed in the Grand Vitara/Escudo. In the Kizashi, the J24B's output increases to 178 or 188 PS (131 or 138 kW; 176 or 185 hp) at 6,000 or 6,500 rpm and 230 N⋅m (23.5 kg⋅m; 170 lb⋅ft) of torque at 4,000 rpm (lower power figure is for European market models).

It is an aluminum engine block and cylinder head with bore and stroke: 92.0 mm × 90.0 mm (3.62 in × 3.54 in). It has dual overhead cams and Multi-port fuel injection with a 10.0:1 compression ratio. It is based on a J23 block but with harder castings and features a crankshaft girdle. It had improved variable valve timing actuation and revised camshafts, along with stronger connecting rods.

It came in the following vehicles:

- Suzuki Kizashi (2009-2016)
- Suzuki Grand Vitara (June 2008-2019)

== See also ==
- List of Suzuki engines
