= Heper =

Heper is a Turkish surname. Notable people with the surname include:

- Fethi Heper (1944–2025), Turkish footballer and finance professor
- Sadettin Heper (1899–1980), Turkish musician and composer of Mevlevi music and Ottoman classical music
